= 2016 Wimbledon Championships – Women's singles qualifying =

Women's singles qualifying
- 2016 Wimbledon Championships

Events
Singles	men	women		boys	girls
Doubles	men	women	mixed	boys	girls
WC Singles	men	women	quad
WC Doubles	men	women	quad
Legends	men	women	seniors

Qualification
Singles	men	women
Doubles	men	women
- Wimbledon Championships

Players and pairs who neither have high enough rankings nor receive wild cards may participate in a qualifying tournament held one week before the annual Wimbledon Tennis Championships.

In 2016, the qualifiers were: Tatjana Maria, Amra Sadiković, Jana Čepelová, Aleksandra Krunić, Maria Sakkari, Julia Boserup, Tamira Paszek, Luksika Kumkhum, Mandy Minella, Ekaterina Alexandrova, Marina Erakovic and Paula Kania.

Duan Yingying received a lucky loser as a replacement for Victoria Azarenka, who withdrew because of injury.

== Seeds ==
1. (Germany) Tatjana Maria (qualified)
2. (Switzerland) Viktorija Golubic (second round)
3. (China) Zhang Kailin (qualifying competition)
4. (Serbia) Aleksandra Krunić (qualified)
5. (Greece) Maria Sakkari (qualified)
6. (United States) Lauren Davis (second round)
7. (Austria) Tamira Paszek (qualified)
8. (Spain) Lourdes Domínguez Lino (first round)
9. (Slovakia) Kristína Kučová (second round)
10. (Japan) Risa Ozaki (second round)
11. (Russia) Irina Khromacheva (qualifying competition)
12. (China) Han Xinyun (first round)
13. (Sweden) Rebecca Peterson (qualifying competition)
14. (Slovakia) Jana Čepelová (qualified)
15. (Spain) Sílvia Soler Espinosa (first round)
16. (China) Duan Yingying (qualifying competition, lucky loser)
17. (Luxembourg) Mandy Minella (qualified)
18. (Netherlands) Richèl Hogenkamp (first round)
19. (New Zealand) Marina Erakovic (qualified)
20. (Czech Republic) Klára Koukalová (first round)
21. (Paraguay) Verónica Cepede Royg (first round)
22. (Ukraine) Maryna Zanevska (qualifying competition)
23. (United States) Jennifer Brady (first round)
24. (Israel) Julia Glushko (first round)

== Qualifiers ==
1. (Germany) Tatjana Maria
2. (Switzerland) Amra Sadiković
3. (Slovakia) Jana Čepelová
4. (Serbia) Aleksandra Krunić
5. (Greece) Maria Sakkari
6. (United States) Julia Boserup
7. (Austria) Tamira Paszek
8. (Thailand) Luksika Kumkhum
9. (Luxembourg) Mandy Minella
10. (Russia) Ekaterina Alexandrova
11. (New Zealand) Marina Erakovic
12. (Poland) Paula Kania

== Lucky losers ==
1. (China) Duan Yingying

== Qualifying draw ==
=== First qualifier ===
First round
1	(Germany) Tatjana Maria	6	6
(France) Myrtille Georges	1	3
(United States) Sachia Vickery	2	7^{7}	3
(Belgium) An-Sophie Mestach	6	6^{4}	6
WC	(United Kingdom) Katie Boulter	7^{8}	7^{9}
(China) Yang Zhaoxuan	6^{6}	6^{7}
(Turkey) İpek Soylu	6	4	1
13	(Sweden) Rebecca Peterson	3	6	6

Second round
1	(Germany) Tatjana Maria	6	6
(Belgium) An-Sophie Mestach	3	3
WC	(United Kingdom) Katie Boulter	6	6^{3}	3
13	(Sweden) Rebecca Peterson	4	7^{7}	6

Qualifying competition
1	(Germany) Tatjana Maria	6	6
13	(Sweden) Rebecca Peterson	3	4

=== Second qualifier ===
First round
2	(Switzerland) Viktorija Golubic	7^{8}	3	6
(Russia) Anastasia Pivovarova	6^{6}	6	3
(Switzerland) Amra Sadiković	6	7
(France) Océane Dodin	4	5
(Japan) Miyu Kato	3	2
(Russia) Alexandra Panova	6	6
(Chinese Taipei) Chang Kai-chen	6	6
24	(Israel) Julia Glushko	2	3

Second round
2	(Switzerland) Viktorija Golubic	4	4
(Switzerland) Amra Sadiković	6	6
(Russia) Alexandra Panova	4	4
(Chinese Taipei) Chang Kai-chen	6	6

Qualifying competition
(Switzerland) Amra Sadiković	6	6
(Chinese Taipei) Chang Kai-chen	2	2

=== Third qualifier ===
First round
3	(China) Zhang Kailin	7	7
(Czech Republic) Lucie Hradecká	5	5
WC	(United Kingdom) Maia Lumsden	6	2	2
(Czech Republic) Tereza Smitková	2	6	6
(France) Shérazad Reix	3	7^{7}	6
(Bulgaria) Sesil Karatantcheva	6	6^{4}	4
(Serbia) Ivana Jorović	2	2
14	(Slovakia) Jana Čepelová	6	6

Second round
3	(China) Zhang Kailin	6^{4}	6	6
(Czech Republic) Tereza Smitková	7^{7}	1	2
(France) Shérazad Reix	4	4
14	(Slovakia) Jana Čepelová	6	6

Qualifying competition
3	(China) Zhang Kailin	0	1
14	(Slovakia) Jana Čepelová	6	6

=== Fourth qualifier ===
First round
4	(Serbia) Aleksandra Krunić	6	6
(Netherlands) Cindy Burger	1	1
(Belgium) Elise Mertens	6	6
(Bulgaria) Elitsa Kostova	4	4
(United States) Taylor Townsend	6	6
(Ukraine) Olga Savchuk	4	4
(United States) Grace Min	7^{7}	3	0
16	(China) Duan Yingying	6^{4}	6	6

Second round
4	(Serbia) Aleksandra Krunić	3	7	6
(Belgium) Elise Mertens	6	5	3
(United States) Taylor Townsend	2	7	2
16	(China) Duan Yingying	6	5	6

Qualifying competition
4	(Serbia) Aleksandra Krunić	6	6
16	(China) Duan Yingying	2	4

=== Fifth qualifier ===
First round
5	(Greece) Maria Sakkari	6	6
(Russia) Polina Leykina	0	0
(Serbia) Jovana Jakšić	6	6
(Japan) Mayo Hibi	1	4
(Czech Republic) Barbora Krejčíková	3	6^{6}
PR	(Portugal) Michelle Larcher de Brito	6	7^{8}
(France) Alizé Lim	2	1
22	(Ukraine) Maryna Zanevska	6	6

Second round
5	(Greece) Maria Sakkari	7^{7}	6
(Serbia) Jovana Jakšić	6^{2}	2
PR	(Portugal) Michelle Larcher de Brito	6	3	4
22	(Ukraine) Maryna Zanevska	3	6	6

Qualifying competition
5	(Greece) Maria Sakkari	6^{5}	7^{7}	6
22	(Ukraine) Maryna Zanevska	7^{7}	6^{3}	2

=== Sixth qualifier ===
First round
6	(United States) Lauren Davis	6	6
(Netherlands) Lesley Kerkhove	3	3
(Austria) Barbara Haas	3	6	6
WC	(United Kingdom) Katy Dunne	6	4	1
(United States) Jessica Pegula	6	6
(Belgium) Ysaline Bonaventure	1	1
(United States) Julia Boserup	6	6
23	(United States) Jennifer Brady	2	2

Second round
6	(United States) Lauren Davis	3	3
(Austria) Barbara Haas	6	6
(United States) Jessica Pegula	2	1
(United States) Julia Boserup	6	6

Qualifying competition
(Austria) Barbara Haas	0	4
(United States) Julia Boserup	6	6

=== Seventh qualifier ===
First round
7	(Austria) Tamira Paszek	6	6
(France) Amandine Hesse	2	1
WC	(United Kingdom) Lisa Whybourn	7^{7}	7
PR	(France) Claire Feuerstein	6^{2}	5
(United States) Asia Muhammad	6^{3}	1
(Czech Republic) Andrea Hlaváčková	7^{7}	6
(China) Wang Yafan	6	4	6
18	(Netherlands) Richèl Hogenkamp	3	6	0

Second round
7	(Austria) Tamira Paszek	6	7^{7}
WC	(United Kingdom) Lisa Whybourn	3	6^{3}
(Czech Republic) Andrea Hlaváčková	7	6
(China) Wang Yafan	5	1

Qualifying competition
7	(Austria) Tamira Paszek	6	5	10
(Czech Republic) Andrea Hlaváčková	3	7	9^{r}

=== Eighth qualifier ===
First round
8	(Spain) Lourdes Domínguez Lino	5	6^{8}
WC	(United Kingdom) Gabriella Taylor	7	7^{10}
(United States) Vania King	6	4	6
(Russia) Alla Kudryavtseva	3	6	1
WC	(Australia) Ashleigh Barty	7^{7}	6
(China) Lu Jiajing	6^{3}	3
(Thailand) Luksika Kumkhum	6	7^{8}
15	(Spain) Sílvia Soler Espinosa	1	6^{6}

Second round
WC	(United Kingdom) Gabriella Taylor	7	4	4
(United States) Vania King	5	6	6
WC	(Australia) Ashleigh Barty	6	4	2
(Thailand) Luksika Kumkhum	3	6	6

Qualifying competition
(United States) Vania King	6^{4}	4
(Thailand) Luksika Kumkhum	7^{7}	6

=== Ninth qualifier ===
First round
9	(Slovakia) Kristína Kučová	6	7^{7}
(Japan) Hiroko Kuwata	4	6^{3}
(Czech Republic) Barbora Štefková	6	6
PR	(Croatia) Tereza Mrdeža	3	2
(Japan) Misa Eguchi	6	6
(Bulgaria) Isabella Shinikova	4	1
(Romania) Ana Bogdan	6	6^{3}	1
17	(Luxembourg) Mandy Minella	4	7^{7}	6

Second round
9	(Slovakia) Kristína Kučová	3	5
(Czech Republic) Barbora Štefková	6	7
(Japan) Misa Eguchi	2	7^{7}	5
17	(Luxembourg) Mandy Minella	6	6^{0}	7

Qualifying competition
(Czech Republic) Barbora Štefková	6	4	2
17	(Luxembourg) Mandy Minella	4	6	6

=== Tenth qualifier ===
First round
10	(Japan) Risa Ozaki	6^{7}	7^{7}	7
WC	(United Kingdom) Freya Christie	7^{9}	6^{4}	5
(China) Liu Fangzhou	6^{2}	3
WC	(United Kingdom) Harriet Dart	7^{7}	6
(Russia) Ekaterina Alexandrova	6	6
(Tunisia) Ons Jabeur	3	3
(Liechtenstein) Stephanie Vogt	6	7
20	(Czech Republic) Klára Koukalová	3	5

Second round
10	(Japan) Risa Ozaki	4	3
WC	(United Kingdom) Harriet Dart	6	6
(Russia) Ekaterina Alexandrova	6	4	14
(Liechtenstein) Stephanie Vogt	4	6	12

Qualifying competition
WC	(United Kingdom) Harriet Dart	6	5	11
(Russia) Ekaterina Alexandrova	2	7	13

=== Eleventh qualifier ===
First round
11	(Russia) Irina Khromacheva	6	3	6
(Spain) Sara Sorribes Tormo	3	6	3
(Romania) Andreea Mitu	6	6
(Germany) Anne Schäfer	4	2
(Poland) Urszula Radwańska	6	7^{7}
(Croatia) Petra Martić	4	6^{2}
(Brazil) Paula Cristina Gonçalves	4	3
19	(New Zealand) Marina Erakovic	6	6

Second round
11	(Russia) Irina Khromacheva	6	6
(Romania) Andreea Mitu	2	4
(Poland) Urszula Radwańska	4	2
19	(New Zealand) Marina Erakovic	6	6

Qualifying competition
11	(Russia) Irina Khromacheva	6^{5}	3
19	(New Zealand) Marina Erakovic	7^{7}	6

=== Twelfth qualifier ===
First round
12	(China) Han Xinyun	1	6^{4}
(United States) Robin Anderson	6	7^{7}
(China) Zhu Lin	4
(Czech Republic) Tereza Martincová	0^{r}
(France) Virginie Razzano	7	7^{9}
(Netherlands) Michaëlla Krajicek	5	6^{7}
(Poland) Paula Kania	6	6
21	(Paraguay) Verónica Cepede Royg	4	1

Second round
(United States) Robin Anderson	5	6	2
(China) Zhu Lin	7	3	6
(France) Virginie Razzano	4	4
(Poland) Paula Kania	6	6

Qualifying competition
(China) Zhu Lin	0	3
(Poland) Paula Kania	6	6
