= 2019 Tennis Championships of Honolulu – Doubles =

Doubles
- 2019 Tennis Championships of Honolulu

Final
- Champions: (United States) Hayley Carter (United States) Jamie Loeb
- Runners-up: (United States) Usue Maitane Arconada (United States) Caroline Dolehide
- Score: 6–4, 6–4

Events
Singles	Doubles
← 2018 ·	Tennis Championships of Honolulu	· 2020 →

Misaki Doi and Jessica Pegula were the defending champions, but chose not to participate.

Hayley Carter and Jamie Loeb won the title, defeating Usue Maitane Arconada and Caroline Dolehide in the final, 6–4, 6–4.

== Seeds ==
1. (United States) Usue Maitane Arconada / (United States) Caroline Dolehide (final)
2. (Chinese Taipei) Hsieh Yu-chieh / (China) You Xiaodi (first round)
3. (United States) Quinn Gleason / (United States) Maegan Manasse (semifinals)
4. (Chinese Taipei) Chen Pei-hsuan / (Chinese Taipei) Wu Fang-hsien (semifinals)

== Draw ==
=== Key ===
- Q = Qualifier
- WC = Wild card
- LL = Lucky loser
- Alt = Alternate
- SE = Special exempt
- PR = Protected ranking
- ITF = ITF entry
- JE = Junior exempt
- w/o = Walkover
- r = Retired
- d = Defaulted
- SR = Special ranking

=== Draw ===
First round
1	(United States) UM Arconada (United States) C Dolehide	6	6
WC	(United States) H Baptiste (United States) E Douglas	3	3
(Japan) M Hontama (Japan) A Shimizu	4	3
(United States) E Bektas (United Kingdom) T Moore	6	6
4	(Chinese Taipei) P-h Chen (Chinese Taipei) F-h Wu	6	6
(Australia) A Myers (Japan) R Ueda	4	1
(United States) C Harrison (Israel) D Khazaniuk	7^{8}	6^{5}	[4]
(Montenegro) V Babić (South Africa) C Simmonds	6^{6}	7^{7}	[10]
WC	(Indonesia) R Kahfiani (United States) A Tobita	1	7	[9]
(Japan) J Namigata (Japan) R Ozaki	6	5	[11]
(United States) G Brodsky (United States) J Robinson	1	3
3	(United States) Q Gleason (United States) M Manasse	6	6
WC	(United States) A Zamarripa (United States) M Zamarripa	6	6
(Japan) H Arakawa (Japan) M Yonehara	3	3
(United States) H Carter (United States) J Loeb	6	6
2	(Chinese Taipei) Y-c Hsieh (China) X You	4	0

Quarterfinals
1	(United States) UM Arconada (United States) C Dolehide	w/o
(United States) E Bektas (United Kingdom) T Moore
4	(Chinese Taipei) P-h Chen (Chinese Taipei) F-h Wu	6	6
(Montenegro) V Babić (South Africa) C Simmonds	4	0
(Japan) J Namigata (Japan) R Ozaki	0	5
3	(United States) Q Gleason (United States) M Manasse	6	7
WC	(United States) A Zamarripa (United States) M Zamarripa	1	5
(United States) H Carter (United States) J Loeb	6	7

Semifinals
1	(United States) UM Arconada (United States) C Dolehide	6	6
4	(Chinese Taipei) P-h Chen (Chinese Taipei) F-h Wu	1	4
3	(United States) Q Gleason (United States) M Manasse	6	1	[9]
(United States) H Carter (United States) J Loeb	3	6	[11]

Final
1	(United States) UM Arconada (United States) C Dolehide	4	4
(United States) H Carter (United States) J Loeb	6	6
