= 2018 Tennis Championships of Honolulu – Doubles =

Doubles
- 2018 Tennis Championships of Honolulu

Final
- Champions: (Japan) Misaki Doi (United States) Jessica Pegula
- Runners-up: (United States) Taylor Johnson (United States) Ashley Lahey
- Score: 7–6^{(7–4)}, 6–3

Events
Singles	Doubles
Tennis Championships of Honolulu	· 2019 →

This was the first edition of the tournament.

Misaki Doi and Jessica Pegula won the title, defeating Taylor Johnson and Ashley Lahey in the final, 7–6^{(7–4)}, 6–3.

== Seeds ==
1. (United States) Jacqueline Cako / (Japan) Nao Hibino (quarterfinals)
2. (Japan) Misaki Doi / (United States) Jessica Pegula (champions)
3. (United Kingdom) Tara Moore / (South Africa) Chanel Simmonds (quarterfinals)
4. (Australia) Alison Bai / (Japan) Miyabi Inoue (withdrew)

== Draw ==
=== Key ===
- Q = Qualifier
- WC = Wild card
- LL = Lucky loser
- Alt = Alternate
- SE = Special exempt
- PR = Protected ranking
- ITF = ITF entry
- JE = Junior exempt
- w/o = Walkover
- r = Retired
- d = Defaulted
- SR = Special ranking

=== Draw ===
First round
1	(United States) J Cako (Japan) N Hibino	w/o
WC	(United States) M Gordon (United States) D Starr
WC	(United States) T Johnson (United States) A Lahey	5	7^{9}	[10]
(Slovenia) N Kolar (United States) A Riley	7	6^{7}	[5]
4	(Australia) A Bai (Japan) M Inoue
(Russia) A Gabueva (United States) A Rodgers	w/o
(Japan) S Akita (Japan) H Arakawa	3	3
(United States) A Parks (United States) A Zhu	6	6
(United States) Q Gleason (United States) A Kratzer	2	4
(United States) UM Arconada (United States) E Bektas	6	6
(United States) J Elbaba (United States) E Shibahara	0	6	[6]
3	(United Kingdom) T Moore (South Africa) C Simmonds	6	4	[10]
(Romania) A Ghițescu (United States) A Nefedova	6^{3}	6^{5}
WC	(Australia) T Farrow (United States) A Tobita	7^{7}	7^{7}
(Serbia) J Jakšić (Australia) O Tjandramulia	6	1	[8]
2	(Japan) M Doi (United States) J Pegula	4	6	[10]

Quarterfinals
1	(United States) J Cako (Japan) N Hibino	6	4	[7]
WC	(United States) T Johnson (United States) A Lahey	3	6	[10]
(Russia) A Gabueva (United States) A Rodgers	3	6	[10]
(United States) A Parks (United States) A Zhu	6	4	[8]
(United States) UM Arconada (United States) E Bektas	6	4	[10]
3	(United Kingdom) T Moore (South Africa) C Simmonds	3	6	[8]
WC	(Australia) T Farrow (United States) A Tobita	1	0
2	(Japan) M Doi (United States) J Pegula	6	6

Semifinals
WC	(United States) T Johnson (United States) A Lahey	4	6	[10]
(Russia) A Gabueva (United States) A Rodgers	6	1	[7]
(United States) UM Arconada (United States) E Bektas	1	3
2	(Japan) M Doi (United States) J Pegula	6	6

Final
WC	(United States) T Johnson (United States) A Lahey	6^{4}	3
2	(Japan) M Doi (United States) J Pegula	7^{7}	6
