= 2019 Tennis Championships of Honolulu =

- Date: 8–14 July 2019
- Edition: 2nd
- Category: ITF Women's World Tennis Tour
- Prize money: $60,000
- Surface: Hard
- Location: Honolulu, United States

Champions

Singles
- (United States) Usue Maitane Arconada

Doubles
- (United States) Hayley Carter / (United States) Jamie Loeb
← 2018 ·	Tennis Championships of Honolulu	· 2020 →

The 2019 Tennis Championships of Honolulu was a professional tennis tournament played on outdoor hard courts. It was the second edition of the tournament which was part of the 2019 ITF Women's World Tennis Tour. It took place in Honolulu, United States between 8 and 14 July 2019.

== Singles main-draw entrants ==
=== Seeds ===
Country	Player	Rank^{1}	Seed
USA	Whitney Osuigwe	110	1
USA	Nicole Gibbs	129	2
JPN	Ayano Shimizu	208	3
AUS	Arina Rodionova	211	4
USA	Usue Maitane Arconada	214	5
JPN	Risa Ozaki	257	6
CHN	Zhang Yuxuan	259	7
ISR	Deniz Khazaniuk	264	8

- ^{1} Rankings are as of 1 July 2019.

=== Other entrants ===
The following players received wildcards into the singles main draw:

- (United States) Kelly Chen
- (United States) Whitney Osuigwe
- (United States) Natasha Subhash
- (United States) Alyssa Tobita

The following players received entry from the qualifying draw:

- (Oman) Fatma Al-Nabhani
- (Montenegro) Vladica Babić
- (United States) Sophie Chang
- (United States) Alycia Parks
- (Mexico) Giuliana Olmos
- (Japan) Michika Ozeki
- (South Africa) Chanel Simmonds
- (United States) Sophia Whittle

== Champions ==
=== Singles ===
- (United States) Usue Maitane Arconada def. (United States) Nicole Gibbs, 6–0, 6–2

=== Doubles ===
- (United States) Hayley Carter / (United States) Jamie Loeb def. (United States) Usue Maitane Arconada / (United States) Caroline Dolehide, 6–4, 6–4
