= 2018 Tennis Championships of Honolulu =

- Date: 9–15 July
- Edition: 1st
- Category: ITF Women's Circuit
- Prize money: $60,000
- Surface: Hard
- Location: Honolulu, United States

Champions

Singles
- (Japan) Nao Hibino

Doubles
- (Japan) Misaki Doi / (United States) Jessica Pegula
Tennis Championships of Honolulu	· 2019 →

The 2018 Tennis Championships of Honolulu was a professional tennis tournament played on outdoor hard courts. It was the first edition of the tournament and was part of the 2018 ITF Women's Circuit. It took place in Honolulu, United States, on 9–15 July 2018.

== Singles main draw entrants ==
=== Seeds ===
Country	Player	Rank^{1}	Seed
JPN	Nao Hibino	119	1
USA	Grace Min	172	2
USA	Ashley Kratzer	230	3
USA	Danielle Lao	239	4
JPN	Misaki Doi	241	5
USA	Asia Muhammad	248	6
USA	Jacqueline Cako	273	7
USA	Emina Bektas	276	8

- ^{1} Rankings as of 2 July 2018.

=== Other entrants ===
The following players received a wildcard into the singles main draw:

- (United States) Ashley Lahey
- (Germany) Lena Lutzeier
- (United States) Anastasia Nefedova
- (United States) Amanda Rodgers

The following players received entry from the qualifying draw:

- (Romania) Andreea Ghițescu
- (United States) Catherine Harrison
- (Peru) Dominique Schaefer
- (United States) Denise Starr

== Champions ==
=== Singles ===
- (Japan) Nao Hibino def. (United States) Jessica Pegula, 6–0, 6–2

=== Doubles ===
- (Japan) Misaki Doi / (United States) Jessica Pegula def. (United States) Taylor Johnson / (United States) Ashley Lahey, 7–6^{(7–4)}, 6–3
