= 2018 Tennis Championships of Honolulu – Singles =

Singles
- 2018 Tennis Championships of Honolulu

Final
- Champion: (Japan) Nao Hibino
- Runner-up: (United States) Jessica Pegula
- Score: 6–0, 6–2

Events
Singles	Doubles
Tennis Championships of Honolulu	· 2019 →

This was the first edition of the tournament.

Nao Hibino won the title, defeating Jessica Pegula in the final, 6–0, 6–2

== Seeds ==
1. (Japan) Nao Hibino (champion)
2. (United States) Grace Min (second round)
3. (United States) Ashley Kratzer (first round)
4. (United States) Danielle Lao (semifinals)
5. (Japan) Misaki Doi (quarterfinals)
6. (United States) Asia Muhammad (quarterfinals)
7. (United States) Jacqueline Cako (first round)
8. (United States) Emina Bektas (semifinals)

== Draw ==
=== Key ===
- Q = Qualifier
- WC = Wild card
- LL = Lucky loser
- Alt = Alternate
- SE = Special exempt
- PR = Protected ranking
- ITF = ITF entry
- JE = Junior exempt
- w/o = Walkover
- r = Retired
- d = Defaulted
- SR = Special ranking

=== Finals ===
Semifinals
1	(Japan) Nao Hibino	3	7	7
4	(United States) Danielle Lao	6	5	5
(United States) Jessica Pegula	6	6
8	(United States) Emina Bektas	3	4

Final
1	(Japan) Nao Hibino	6	6
(United States) Jessica Pegula	0	2

=== Top half ===
First round
1	(Japan) N Hibino	4	6	6
(Australia) O Tjandramulia	6	4	2
WC	(United States) A Lahey	6^{5}	6	6^{6}
WC	(United States) A Rodgers	7^{7}	3	7^{8}
(United States) UM Arconada	6	1	7^{8}
(Japan) S Akita	0	6	6^{6}
Q	(Romania) A Ghițescu	6	7^{7}
7	(United States) J Cako	4	6^{4}
4	(United States) D Lao	6	6
(Australia) A Bai	4	3
(United Kingdom) T Moore	3	7	3
Q	(United States) C Harrison	6	5	6
Q	(Peru) D Schaefer	6	5	3
(Slovenia) N Kolar	1	7	6
WC	(United States) A Nefedova	2	2
6	(United States) A Muhammad	6	6

Second round
1	(Japan) N Hibino	6	6
WC	(United States) A Rodgers	0	2
(United States) UM Arconada	6	6
Q	(Romania) A Ghițescu	2	2
4	(United States) D Lao	6	2	6
Q	(United States) C Harrison	3	6	1
(Slovenia) N Kolar	4	2
6	(United States) A Muhammad	6	6

Quarterfinals
1	(Japan) N Hibino	6	7^{9}
(United States) UM Arconada	3	6^{7}
4	(United States) D Lao	6	6
6	(United States) A Muhammad	4	3

Semifinals
1	(Japan) N Hibino	3	7	7
4	(United States) D Lao	6	5	5

=== Bottom half ===
First round
5	(Japan) M Doi	6	6
(United States) J Elbaba	2	2
(Japan) H Kaji	4	1
(Japan) N Hanatani	6	6
Q	(United States) D Starr	0	1
(South Africa) C Simmonds	6	6
(United States) J Pegula	3	6	6
3	(United States) A Kratzer	6	0	2
8	(United States) E Bektas	6	6
(United States) Q Gleason	3	2
(Colombia) E Arango	7	6
WC	(Germany) L Lutzeier	5	2
(Japan) M Inoue	7	5	0^{r}
(Japan) M Minokoshi	5	7	5
(Serbia) J Jakšić	3	2
2	(United States) G Min	6	6

Second round
5	(Japan) M Doi	6	6
(Japan) N Hanatani	4	2
(South Africa) C Simmonds	3	5
(United States) J Pegula	6	7
8	(United States) E Bektas	6	7
(Colombia) E Arango	2	5
(Japan) M Minokoshi	4	6	7
2	(United States) G Min	6	3	5

Quarterfinals
5	(Japan) M Doi	6	3	1
(United States) J Pegula	3	6	6
8	(United States) E Bektas	6	6
(Japan) M Minokoshi	3	2

Semifinals
(United States) J Pegula	6	6
8	(United States) E Bektas	3	4
