= 2019 Tennis Championships of Honolulu – Singles =

Singles
- 2019 Tennis Championships of Honolulu

Final
- Champion: (United States) Usue Maitane Arconada
- Runner-up: (United States) Nicole Gibbs
- Score: 6–0, 6–2

Events
Singles	Doubles
← 2018 ·	Tennis Championships of Honolulu	· 2020 →

Nao Hibino was the defending champion, but chose not to participate.

Usue Maitane Arconada won the title, defeating Nicole Gibbs in the final, 6–0, 6–2.

== Seeds ==
1. (United States) Whitney Osuigwe (quarterfinals)
2. (United States) Nicole Gibbs (final)
3. (Japan) Ayano Shimizu (first round)
4. (Australia) Arina Rodionova (second round)
5. (United States) Usue Maitane Arconada (champion)
6. (Japan) Risa Ozaki (second round)
7. (China) Zhang Yuxuan (first round)
8. (Israel) Deniz Khazaniuk (second round)

== Draw ==
=== Key ===
- Q = Qualifier
- WC = Wild card
- LL = Lucky loser
- Alt = Alternate
- SE = Special exempt
- PR = Protected ranking
- ITF = ITF entry
- JE = Junior exempt
- w/o = Walkover
- r = Retired
- d = Defaulted
- SR = Special ranking

=== Finals ===
Semifinals
(United States) Jamie Loeb	2	4
5	(United States) Usue Maitane Arconada	6	6
(United States) Caroline Dolehide	4	7^{8}	4
2	(United States) Nicole Gibbs	6	6^{6}	6

Final
5	(United States) Usue Maitane Arconada	6	6
2	(United States) Nicole Gibbs	0	2

=== Top half ===
First round
1/WC	(United States) W Osuigwe	6	6
WC	(United States) A Tobita	4	2
(China) X You	7	3	4
(United States) E Bektas	5	6	6
(United States) G Brodsky	4	3
(Japan) M Hontama	6	6
(United States) J Loeb	6	6
7	(China) Y Zhang	4	1
4	(Australia) Ar Rodionova	6	6
(United States) C Harrison	4	2
(Japan) M Hibi	6	6
(Japan) J Namigata	4	1
(United States) M Manasse	7	6
Q	(Mexico) G Olmos	5	2
(United States) H Baptiste	3	2
5	(United States) UM Arconada	6	6

Second round
1/WC	(United States) W Osuigwe	3
(United States) E Bektas	2^{r}
(Japan) M Hontama	5	3
(United States) J Loeb	7	6
4	(Australia) Ar Rodionova	1	2
(Japan) M Hibi	6	6
(United States) M Manasse	6	2	2
5	(United States) UM Arconada	2	6	6

Quarterfinals
1/WC	(United States) W Osuigwe	4	6	1
(United States) J Loeb	6	4	6
(Japan) M Hibi	3	3
5	(United States) UM Arconada	6	6

Semifinals
(United States) J Loeb	2	4
5	(United States) UM Arconada	6	6

=== Bottom half ===
First round
6	(Japan) R Ozaki	7	6
WC	(United States) K Chen	5	4
Q	(United States) S Chang	6^{5}	3
(United States) K Day	7^{7}	6
WC	(United States) N Subhash	6	7
Q	(South Africa) C Simmonds	3	5
(United States) C Dolehide	4	6	6
3	(Japan) A Shimizu	6	1	1
8	(Israel) D Khazaniuk	1	6	6
Q	(Japan) M Ozeki	6	3	4
(United States) Q Gleason	6	6
Q	(Oman) F Al-Nabhani	3	0
Q	(United States) A Parks	6	6
Q	(Montenegro) V Babić	3	4
Q	(United States) S Whittle	6^{3}	6	3
2	(United States) N Gibbs	7^{7}	4	6

Second round
6	(Japan) R Ozaki	5	3
(United States) K Day	7	6
WC	(United States) N Subhash	2	3
(United States) C Dolehide	6	6
8	(Israel) D Khazaniuk	6	4	1
(United States) Q Gleason	1	6	6
Q	(United States) A Parks	2	2
2	(United States) N Gibbs	6	6

Quarterfinals
(United States) K Day	7	3	1
(United States) C Dolehide	5	6	6
(United States) Q Gleason	3	1
2	(United States) N Gibbs	6	6

Semifinals
(United States) C Dolehide	4	7^{8}	4
2	(United States) N Gibbs	6	6^{6}	6
