= 2016 Wimbledon Championships – Girls' singles =

Girls' singles
- 2016 Wimbledon Championships

Final
- Champions: (Russia) Anastasia Potapova
- Runners-up: (Ukraine) Dayana Yastremska
- Score: 6–4, 6–3

Events
Singles	men	women		boys	girls
Doubles	men	women	mixed	boys	girls
WC Singles	men	women	quad
WC Doubles	men	women	quad
Legends	men	women	seniors
← 2015 ·	Wimbledon Championships	· 2017 →

Anastasia Potapova won the title, defeating Dayana Yastremska in the final, 6–4, 6–3.

Sofya Zhuk was the defending champion, but chose not to participate this year.

== Seeds ==
1. (Russia) Olesya Pervushina (semifinals)
2. (Switzerland) Rebeka Masarova (third round)
3. (United States) Amanda Anisimova (third round)
4. (Russia) Anastasia Potapova (champion)
5. (United States) Kayla Day (semifinals)
6. (Canada) Bianca Andreescu (third round)
7. (Ukraine) Dayana Yastremska (final)
8. (United States) Sofia Kenin (quarterfinals)
9. (United States) Usue Maitane Arconada (quarterfinals)
10. (Serbia) Olga Danilović (third round)
11. (Japan) Yuki Naito (first round)
12. (United Kingdom) Katie Swan (first round, retired)
13. (Slovenia) Kaja Juvan (first round)
14. (Ukraine) Katarina Zavatska (third round)
15. (Russia) Elena Rybakina (first round)
16. (Japan) Mai Hontama (second round)

== Draw ==
=== Key ===
- Q = Qualifier
- WC = Wild card
- LL = Lucky loser
- Alt = Alternate
- SE = Special exempt
- PR = Protected ranking
- ITF = ITF entry
- JE = Junior exempt
- w/o = Walkover
- r = Retired
- d = Defaulted
- SR = Special ranking

=== Finals ===
Quarterfinals
1	(Russia) Olesya Pervushina	6	6
8	(United States) Sofia Kenin	0	0
(United States) Claire Liu	1	4
7	(Ukraine) Dayana Yastremska	6	6
9	(United States) Usue Maitane Arconada	3	2
4	(Russia) Anastasia Potapova	6	6
5	(United States) Kayla Day	6	1
WC	(United Kingdom) Gabriella Taylor	4	1^{r}

Semifinals
1	(Russia) Olesya Pervushina	6^{4}	7^{7}	3
7	(Ukraine) Dayana Yastremska	7^{7}	6^{2}	6
4	(Russia) Anastasia Potapova	5	6	6
5	(United States) Kayla Day	7	2	0

Final
7	(Ukraine) Dayana Yastremska	4	3
4	(Russia) Anastasia Potapova	6	6

=== Top half ===
==== Section 1 ====
First round
1	(Russia) Olesya Pervushina	4	7^{7}	6
(United States) Maria Mateas	6	6^{1}	2
(Italy) Tatiana Pieri	6	6
(United Kingdom) Emily Appleton	3	3
(United States) Alexandra Sanford	7^{7}	7^{7}
(China) Zheng Wushuang	6^{4}	6^{5}
(Moldova) Anastasia Dețiuc	5	2
16	(Japan) Mai Hontama	7	6
12	(United Kingdom) Katie Swan	5^{r}
Q	(Georgia (country)) Mariam Bolkvadze	6
(Paraguay) Lara Escauriza	6^{1}	5
(India) Karman Kaur Thandi	7^{7}	7
(Switzerland) Ylena In-Albon	6	6^{4}	3
(Argentina) María Lourdes Carlé	1	7^{7}	6
WC	(United Kingdom) Ali Collins	1	1
8	(United States) Sofia Kenin	6	6

Second round
1	(Russia) O Pervushina	6	6
(Italy) T Pieri	1	2
(United States) A Sanford	6	3	6
16	(Japan) M Hontama	3	6	1
Q	(Georgia (country)) M Bolkvadze	4	6	6
(India) KK Thandi	6	2	2
(Argentina) ML Carlé	3	2
8	(United States) S Kenin	6	6

Third round
1	(Russia) O Pervushina	6	7^{8}
(United States) A Sanford	2	6^{6}
Q	(Georgia (country)) M Bolkvadze	6	3	2
8	(United States) S Kenin	4	6	6

Quarterfinals
1	(Russia) O Pervushina	6	6
8	(United States) S Kenin	0	0

==== Section 2 ====
First round
3	(United States) Amanda Anisimova	6	6
(Hungary) Panna Udvardy	2	2
Q	(United Kingdom) Lauryn John-Baptiste	2	3
(Australia) Jaimee Fourlis	6	6
Q	(Belgium) Lara Salden	6	7
WC	(United Kingdom) Georgina Axon	1	5
(United States) Claire Liu	6	6
15	(Russia) Elena Rybakina	1	3
10	(Serbia) Olga Danilović	7	2	6
(Czech Republic) Monika Kilnarová	5	6	3
(Canada) Charlotte Robillard-Millette	6	6
(Norway) Malene Helgø	2	3
(United Kingdom) Jodie Burrage	6	3	6
(United States) Caty McNally	4	6	1
(Romania) Ioana Mincă	6	2	6
7	(Ukraine) Dayana Yastremska	2	6	8

Second round
3	(United States) A Anisimova	6	6
(Australia) J Fourlis	3	4
Q	(Belgium) L Salden	2	2
(United States) C Liu	6	6
10	(Serbia) O Danilović	6	5	9
(Canada) C Robillard-Millette	4	7	7
(United Kingdom) J Burrage	5	6	2
7	(Ukraine) D Yastremska	7	4	6

Third round
3	(United States) A Anisimova	6	2	11
(United States) C Liu	4	6	13
10	(Serbia) O Danilović	0	4
7	(Ukraine) D Yastremska	6	6

Quarterfinals
(United States) C Liu	1	4
7	(Ukraine) D Yastremska	6	6

=== Bottom half ===
==== Section 3 ====
First round
6	(Canada) Bianca Andreescu	6	6
Q	(Italy) Ludmilla Samsonova	3	2
WC	(United Kingdom) Maia Lumsden	7^{7}	3	3
Q	(Spain) Paula Arias Manjón	6^{3}	6	6
(Czech Republic) Lucie Kaňková	6	6
Q	(United States) Chiara Lommer	2	1
(Poland) Iga Świątek	4	6	7
9	(United States) Usue Maitane Arconada	6	4	9
14	(Ukraine) Katarina Zavatska	6	6
Q	(China) Du Zhima	0	2
(Japan) Chihiro Muramatsu	2	4
(United States) Michaela Gordon	6	6
(United States) Taylor Johnson	6	6
WC	(United Kingdom) Eden Richardson	4	3
(Sweden) Mirjam Björklund	1	0
4	(Russia) Anastasia Potapova	6	6

Second round
6	(Canada) B Andreescu	6	6
Q	(Spain) P Arias Manjón	4	4
(Czech Republic) L Kaňková	2	3
9	(United States) UM Arconada	6	6
14	(Ukraine) K Zavatska	6	6
(United States) M Gordon	1	3
(United States) T Johnson	1	1
4	(Russia) A Potapova	6	6

Third round
6	(Canada) B Andreescu	2	2
9	(United States) UM Arconada	6	6
14	(Ukraine) K Zavatska	4	3
4	(Russia) A Potapova	6	6

Quarterfinals
9	(United States) UM Arconada	3	2
4	(Russia) A Potapova	6	6

==== Section 4 ====
First round
5	(United States) Kayla Day	7	6
(Peru) Dominique Schaefer	5	3
(Colombia) Emiliana Arango	6	6^{4}	3
WC	(United Kingdom) Francesca Jones	4	7^{7}	6
(Australia) Baijing Lin	3	1
(Russia) Varvara Gracheva	6	6
(Ukraine) Anastasia Zarytska	7	6
11	(Japan) Yuki Naito	5	4
13	(Slovenia) Kaja Juvan	3	7^{8}	2
Q	(Italy) Lucrezia Stefanini	6	6^{6}	6
WC	(United Kingdom) Gabriella Taylor	6	6
(United States) Morgan Coppoc	3	1
(Argentina) Melany Krywoj	6	6
(Romania) Oana Gavrilă	1	1
WC	(United Kingdom) Ema Lazic	5	1
2	(Switzerland) Rebeka Masarova	7	6

Second round
5	(United States) K Day	4	7	6
WC	(United Kingdom) F Jones	6	5	1
(Russia) V Gracheva	6	6
(Ukraine) A Zarytska	1	3
Q	(Italy) L Stefanini	2	2
WC	(United Kingdom) G Taylor	6	6
(Argentina) M Krywoj	2	1
2	(Switzerland) R Masarova	6	6

Third round
5	(United States) K Day	6	6
(Russia) V Gracheva	3	2
WC	(United Kingdom) G Taylor	6	6
2	(Switzerland) R Masarova	1	1

Quarterfinals
5	(United States) K Day	6	1
WC	(United Kingdom) G Taylor	4	1^{r}

== Qualifying ==
=== Seeds ===
1. (Poland) Wiktoria Kulik (first round)
2. (Australia) Seone Mendez (qualifying competition)
3. (Spain) Paula Arias Manjón (qualified)
4. (Italy) Lucrezia Stefanini (qualified)
5. (Italy) Federica Bilardo (first round)
6. (China) Ren Jiaqi (first round)
7. (Chinese Taipei) Lee Yang (first round)
8. (Belgium) Lara Salden (qualified)
9. (Italy) Ludmilla Samsonova (qualified)
10. (Croatia) Lea Bošković (qualifying competition)
11. (Sweden) Ida Jarlskog (withdrew)
12. (China) Cao Siqi (qualifying competition)
13. (China) Du Zhima (qualified)
14. (Japan) Mayuka Aikawa (first round)
15. (Turkey) Berfu Cengiz (first round)
16. (China) Ma Shuyue (first round)

=== Qualifiers ===
1. (China) Du Zhima
2. (Italy) Ludmilla Samsonova
3. (Spain) Paula Arias Manjón
4. (Italy) Lucrezia Stefanini
5. (United States) Chiara Lommer
6. (United Kingdom) Lauryn John-Baptiste
7. (Georgia (country)) Mariam Bolkvadze
8. (Belgium) Lara Salden

=== Draw ===
==== First qualifier ====
First round
1	(Poland) Wiktoria Kulik	6^{6}	0
(Netherlands) Nina Kruijer	7^{8}	6
(Indonesia) Rifanty Kahfiani	6^{5}	6	3
13	(China) Du Zhima	7^{7}	3	6

Qualifying competition
(Netherlands) Nina Kruijer	3	3
13	(China) Du Zhima	6	6

==== Second qualifier ====
First round
2/WC	(Australia) Seone Mendez	7^{8}	6
(Sweden) Julia Rosenqvist	6^{6}	2
WC	(United Kingdom) Megan Davies	6^{3}	0
9	(Italy) Ludmilla Samsonova	7^{7}	6

Qualifying competition
2/WC	(Australia) Seone Mendez	6	1	2
9	(Italy) Ludmilla Samsonova	3	6	6

==== Third qualifier ====
First round
3	(Spain) Paula Arias Manjón	6	6
WC	(United Kingdom) Esther Adeshina	3	1
(India) Zeel Desai	3	6	3
12	(China) Cao Siqi	6	4	6

Qualifying competition
3	(Spain) Paula Arias Manjón	6	6^{5}	6
12	(China) Cao Siqi	3	7^{7}	1

==== Fourth qualifier ====
First round
4	(Italy) Lucrezia Stefanini	6	6
(Latvia) Daniela Vismane	3	1
WC	(United Kingdom) Eliz Maloney	7	3	6
14	(Japan) Mayuka Aikawa	5	6	4

Qualifying competition
4	(Italy) Lucrezia Stefanini	6	6
WC	(United Kingdom) Eliz Maloney	1	1

==== Fifth qualifier ====
First round
5	(Italy) Federica Bilardo	6	6^{2}	2
(United States) Chiara Lommer	3	7^{7}	6
(Russia) Vlada Koval	0	2
10	(Croatia) Lea Bošković	6	6

Qualifying competition
(United States) Chiara Lommer	7^{7}	6
10	(Croatia) Lea Bošković	6^{3}	3

==== Sixth qualifier ====
First round
6	(China) Ren Jiaqi	3	5
WC	(United Kingdom) Lauryn John-Baptiste	6	7
(Ecuador) Camila Romero	6	6
15	(Turkey) Berfu Cengiz	4	4

Qualifying competition
WC	(United Kingdom) Lauryn John-Baptiste	6	6
(Ecuador) Camila Romero	2	2

==== Seventh qualifier ====
First round
7	(Chinese Taipei) Lee Yang	4	2
(Australia) Destanee Aiava	6	6
(Georgia (country)) Mariam Bolkvadze	6	6
16	(China) Ma Shuyue	3	3

Qualifying competition
(Australia) Destanee Aiava	3	6	4
(Georgia (country)) Mariam Bolkvadze	6	3	6

==== Eighth qualifier ====
First round
8	(Belgium) Lara Salden	7^{7}	6
WC	(United Kingdom) Nell Miller	6^{2}	4
(Greece) Eleni Christofi	6	6
Alt	(China) Ma Yexin	3	3

Qualifying competition
8	(Belgium) Lara Salden	7	6
(Greece) Eleni Christofi	5	1
