= Tennis Championships of Honolulu =

- 2019 Tennis Championships of Honolulu

ITF Women's Tour
- Event name: Tennis Championships of Honolulu
- Location: Honolulu, United States
- Venue: University of Hawaii at Manoa
- Category: ITF Women's Circuit
- Surface: Hard
- Draw: 32S/32Q/16D
- Prize money: $60,000
- Website: www.gotcoh.com

The Tennis Championships of Honolulu was a tournament for professional female tennis players played on outdoor hardcourts. The event, classified as a $60,000 ITF Women's Circuit tournament, was held in Honolulu, Hawaii, United States in 2018 and 2019.

== Past finals ==
=== Singles ===
Year	Champion	Runner-up	Score
2019	(United States) Usue Maitane Arconada	(United States) Nicole Gibbs	6–0, 6–2
2018	(Japan) Nao Hibino	(United States) Jessica Pegula	6–0, 6–2

=== Doubles ===
Year	Champions	Runners-up	Score
2019	(United States) Hayley Carter (United States) Jamie Loeb	(United States) Usue Maitane Arconada (United States) Caroline Dolehide	6–4, 6–4
2018	(Japan) Misaki Doi (United States) Jessica Pegula	(United States) Taylor Johnson (United States) Ashley Lahey	7–6^{(7–4)}, 6–3
