= 2016 Wimbledon Championships – Boys' singles =

Boys' singles
- 2016 Wimbledon Championships

Final
- Champion: (Canada) Denis Shapovalov
- Runner-up: (Australia) Alex de Minaur
- Score: 4–6, 6–1, 6–3

Events
Singles	men	women		boys	girls
Doubles	men	women	mixed	boys	girls
WC Singles	men	women	quad
WC Doubles	men	women	quad
Legends	men	women	seniors
- Wimbledon Championships

Denis Shapovalov won the title, defeating Alex de Minaur in the final, 4–6, 6–1, 6–3.

Reilly Opelka was the defending champion, but was no longer eligible to compete in junior events.

== Seeds ==
1. (Greece) Stefanos Tsitsipas (semifinals)
2. (United States) Ulises Blanch (semifinals)
3. (Canada) Félix Auger-Aliassime (quarterfinals)
4. (Hungary) Máté Valkusz (quarterfinals)
5. (Canada) Denis Shapovalov (champion)
6. (Japan) Yosuke Watanuki (third round)
7. (Australia) Alex de Minaur (final)
8. (France) Geoffrey Blancaneaux (quarterfinals)
9. (Argentina) Genaro Alberto Olivieri (second round)
10. (South Korea) Chung Yun-seong (third round)
11. (Uzbekistan) Jurabek Karimov (quarterfinals, retired)
12. (Serbia) Miomir Kecmanović (third round)
13. (Canada) Benjamin Sigouin (first round)
14. (Austria) Jurij Rodionov (first round)
15. (China) Wu Yibing (second round)
16. (United States) John McNally (third round)

== Draw ==
Key

- Q = Qualifier
- WC = Wild card
- LL = Lucky loser
- Alt = Alternate
- ITF = ITF entry
- PR = Protected ranking
- SR = Special ranking
- SE = Special exempt
- JE = Junior exempt
- JR = Junior Accelerator Programme entrant
- CO = College Accelerator Programme entrant
- NG = Next Gen Accelerator Program entrant
- w/o = Walkover
- r = Retired
- d = Defaulted

=== Finals ===
Quarterfinals
1	(Greece) Stefanos Tsitsipas	3	2
11	(Uzbekistan) Jurabek Karimov	6	1^{r}
4	(Hungary) Máté Valkusz	4	2
5	(Canada) Denis Shapovalov	6	6
7	(Australia) Alex de Minaur	5	7^{7}	6
3	(Canada) Félix Auger-Aliassime	7	6^{5}	2
8	(France) Geoffrey Blancaneaux	3	2
2	(United States) Ulises Blanch	6	6

Semifinals
1	(Greece) Stefanos Tsitsipas	6	6^{5}	2
5	(Canada) Denis Shapovalov	4	7^{7}	6
7	(Australia) Alex de Minaur	6	6
2	(United States) Ulises Blanch	3	2

Final
5	(Canada) Denis Shapovalov	4	6	6
7	(Australia) Alex de Minaur	6	1	3

=== Top half ===
==== Section 1 ====
First round
1	(Greece) Stefanos Tsitsipas	7^{7}	7
WC	(United Kingdom) Alexis Canter	6^{3}	5
(United States) Vasil Kirkov	7^{7}	6
(Brazil) Gabriel Décamps	6^{4}	3
WC	(United Kingdom) Ben Draper	6	6^{4}	7
Q	(United States) Olukayode Ayeni	0	7^{7}	5
(France) Evan Furness	7^{10}	2	6
13	(Canada) Benjamin Sigouin	6^{8}	6	4
11	(Uzbekistan) Jurabek Karimov	6	6
(Germany) Louis Wessels	4	4
(United Kingdom) Jay Clarke	6	6
(Argentina) Tomás Martín Etcheverry	1	4
(Russia) Lev Kazakov	7	2	6
Q	(United States) Nathan Ponwith	5	6	1
(France) Elliot Benchetrit	5	4
6	(Japan) Yosuke Watanuki	7	6

Second round
1	(Greece) S Tsitsipas	6	3	6
(United States) V Kirkov	1	6	1
WC	(United Kingdom) B Draper	3	6^{4}
(France) E Furness	6	7^{7}
11	(Uzbekistan) J Karimov	7	6
(United Kingdom) J Clarke	5	4
(Russia) L Kazakov	6	1	4
6	(Japan) Y Watanuki	3	6	6

Third round
1	(Greece) S Tsitsipas	6	6
(France) E Furness	3	3
11	(Uzbekistan) J Karimov	7^{7}	6
6	(Japan) Y Watanuki	6^{4}	4

Quarterfinals
1	(Greece) S Tsitsipas	3	2
11	(Uzbekistan) J Karimov	6	1^{r}

==== Section 2 ====
First round
4	(Hungary) Máté Valkusz	7^{7}	7^{7}
Q	(Estonia) Mattias Siimar	6^{3}	6^{1}
WC	(United Kingdom) Luke Hammond	7^{7}	7^{7}
(France) Dan Added	6^{3}	6^{1}
Q	(Hong Kong) Anthony Jackie Tang	6	2	1
(Australia) Blake Ellis	4	6	6
Q	(Italy) Riccardo Balzerani	6^{6}	2
16	(United States) John McNally	7^{8}	6
10	(South Korea) Chung Yun-seong	4	7^{7}	6
(Poland) Kacper Żuk	6	6^{2}	1
(Egypt) Youssef Hossam	4	5
(Spain) Eduard Güell Bartina	6	7
(Germany) Marvin Möller	4	5
WC	(United Kingdom) Finn Bass	6	7
Q	(United States) William Blumberg	3	4
5	(Canada) Denis Shapovalov	6	6

Second round
4	(Hungary) M Valkusz	7	6
WC	(United Kingdom) L Hammond	5	1
(Australia) B Ellis	4	6^{5}
16	(United States) J McNally	6	7^{7}
10	(South Korea) Y-s Chung	6	6
(Spain) E Güell Bartina	2	2
WC	(United Kingdom) F Bass	1	5
5	(Canada) D Shapovalov	6	7

Third round
4	(Hungary) M Valkusz	6	6
16	(United States) J McNally	3	2
10	(South Korea) Y-s Chung	6^{2}	3
5	(Canada) D Shapovalov	7^{7}	6

Quarterfinals
4	(Hungary) M Valkusz	4	2
5	(Canada) D Shapovalov	6	6

=== Bottom half ===
==== Section 3 ====
First round
7	(Australia) Alex de Minaur	6	7
(Estonia) Kenneth Raisma	4	5
Q	(Italy) Enrico Dalla Valle	6	6
(Japan) Toru Horie	3	0
WC	(United Kingdom) Max Stewart	2	0
(Germany) Daniel Altmaier	6	6
(France) Louis Tessa	7^{9}	4	3
9	(Argentina) Genaro Alberto Olivieri	6^{7}	6	6
14	(Austria) Jurij Rodionov	2	7	4
(Poland) Piotr Matuszewski	6	5	6
WC	(United Kingdom) Aidan McHugh	3	5
(Brazil) Felipe Meligeni Alves	6	7
(United States) Sam Riffice	6^{9}	3
(Spain) Nicola Kuhn	7^{11}	6
WC	(United Kingdom) Alastair Gray	2	3
3	(Canada) Félix Auger-Aliassime	6	6

Second round
7	(Australia) A de Minaur	6	7^{7}
Q	(Italy) E Dalla Valle	3	6^{0}
(Germany) D Altmaier	6	5	6
9	(Argentina) GA Olivieri	2	7	4
(Poland) P Matuszewski	1	6	6
(Brazil) F Meligeni Alves	6	4	4
(Spain) N Kuhn	6^{5}	3
3	(Canada) F Auger-Aliassime	7^{7}	6

Third round
7	(Australia) A de Minaur	7^{7}	6
(Germany) D Altmaier	6^{5}	4
(Poland) P Matuszewski	0	5
3	(Canada) F Auger-Aliassime	6	7

Quarterfinals
7	(Australia) A de Minaur	5	7^{7}	6
3	(Canada) F Auger-Aliassime	7	6^{5}	2

==== Section 4 ====
First round
8	(France) Geoffrey Blancaneaux	6	6
(Japan) Yuta Shimizu	4	1
(United Kingdom) Ryan James Storrie	6^{5}	6	7
(United States) J. J. Wolf	7^{7}	3	5
(Chinese Taipei) Wu Tung-lin	7	7^{7}
(Australia) Alexei Popyrin	5	6^{4}
(Spain) Alejandro Davidovich Fokina	3	6	2
12	(Serbia) Miomir Kecmanović	6	4	6
15	(China) Wu Yibing	6	3	6
Q	(Germany) Tim Rühl	2	6	3
(Russia) Pavel Kotov	2	3
(Uzbekistan) Khumoyun Sultonov	6	6
(Turkey) Ergi Kırkın	2	3
WC	(United Kingdom) Ewan Moore	6	6
(Norway) Casper Ruud	6^{5}	2
2	(United States) Ulises Blanch	7^{7}	6

Second round
8	(France) G Blancaneaux	5
(United Kingdom) RJ Storrie	3^{r}
(Chinese Taipei) T-l Wu	6^{5}	1
12	(Serbia) M Kecmanović	7^{7}	6
15	(China) Y Wu	4	5
(Uzbekistan) K Sultonov	6	7
WC	(United Kingdom) E Moore	2	6^{6}
2	(United States) U Blanch	6	7^{8}

Third round
8	(France) G Blancaneaux	7	1	6
12	(Serbia) M Kecmanović	5	6	3
(Uzbekistan) K Sultonov	4	3
2	(United States) U Blanch	6	6

Quarterfinals
8	(France) G Blancaneaux	3	2
2	(United States) U Blanch	6	6

== Qualifying ==
=== Seeds ===
1. (Bolivia) Juan Carlos Aguilar (first round)
2. (Israel) Yshai Oliel (first round)
3. (United States) Gianni Ross (qualifying competition)
4. (Portugal) Duarte Vale (first round)
5. (Romania) Vlad Andrei Dancu (qualifying competition)
6. (Argentina) Juan Martín Jalif (first round)
7. (Japan) Naoki Tajima (first round)
8. (Argentina) Francisco Vittar (first round)
9. (United States) Trent Bryde (qualifying competition)
10. (United States) Nathan Pontwith (qualified)
11. (China) Zhao Lingxi (first round)
12. (United States) Oliver Crawford (qualifying competition)
13. (Slovakia) Lukáš Klein (qualifying competition)
14. (Belgium) Seppe Cuypers (first round)
15. (Japan) Yunosuke Tanaka (first round)
16. (China) Lyu Chengze (first round)

=== Qualifiers ===
1. (Hong Kong) Anthony Jackie Tang
2. (Italy) Enrico Dalla Valle
3. (Italy) Riccardo Balzerani
4. (United States) Olukayode Ayeni
5. (Germany) Tim Rühl
6. (United States) Nathan Pontwith
7. (United States) William Blumberg
8. (Estonia) Mattias Siimar

=== Draw ===
==== First qualifier ====
First round
1	(Bolivia) Juan Carlos Aguilar	3	6^{3}
(Hong Kong) Anthony Jackie Tang	6	7^{7}
(Japan) James Kent Trotter	2	4
12	(United States) Oliver Crawford	6	6

Qualifying competition
(Hong Kong) Anthony Jackie Tang	6	6
12	(United States) Oliver Crawford	3	3

==== Second qualifier ====
First round
2	(Israel) Yshai Oliel	5	3
(Italy) Enrico Dalla Valle	7	6
WC	(United Kingdom) Joe Tyler	6	7
16	(China) Lyu Chengze	3	5

Qualifying competition
(Italy) Enrico Dalla Valle	7	6
WC	(United Kingdom) Joe Tyler	5	0

==== Third qualifier ====
First round
3	(United States) Gianni Ross	6	7^{7}
WC	(United Kingdom) Jake Hersey	2	6^{5}
(Italy) Riccardo Balzerani	6	6
15	(Japan) Yunosuke Tanaka	3	4

Qualifying competition
3	(United States) Gianni Ross	6	1	1
(Italy) Riccardo Balzerani	4	6	6

==== Fourth qualifier ====
First round
4	(Portugal) Duarte Vale	6^{6}	5
(United States) Olukayode Ayeni	7^{8}	7
WC	(United Kingdom) Jack Molloy	6^{3}	5
13	(Slovakia) Lukáš Klein	7^{7}	7

Qualifying competition
(United States) Olukayode Ayeni	4	6	6
13	(Slovakia) Lukáš Klein	6	2	3

==== Fifth qualifier ====
First round
5	(Romania) Vlad Andrei Dancu	6	6
WC	(United Kingdom) Jack Draper	3	2
(Germany) Tim Rühl	6	7
11	(China) Zhao Lingxi	3	5

Qualifying competition
5	(Romania) Vlad Andrei Dancu	1	0^{r}
(Germany) Tim Rühl	6	0

==== Sixth qualifier ====
First round
6	(Argentina) Juan Martín Jalif	6	3	4
WC	(United Kingdom) Anton Matusevich	4	6	6
(Italy) Corrado Summaria	2	5
10	(United States) Nathan Pontwith	6	7

Qualifying competition
WC	(United Kingdom) Anton Matusevich	1	2
10	(United States) Nathan Pontwith	6	6

==== Seventh qualifier ====
First round
7	(Japan) Naoki Tajima	4	4
(Denmark) August Holmgren	6	6
(United States) William Blumberg	6	6
14	(Belgium) Seppe Cuypers	4	4

Qualifying competition
(Denmark) August Holmgren	5	1
(United States) William Blumberg	7	6

==== Eighth qualifier ====
First round
8	(Argentina) Francisco Vittar	1	2
(Estonia) Mattias Siimar	6	6
WC	(United Kingdom) Damian Rodriguez	3	4
9	(United States) Trent Bryde	6	6

Qualifying competition
(Estonia) Mattias Siimar	6	7
9	(United States) Trent Bryde	4	5
