= 2016 Wimbledon Championships – Women's singles =

Women's singles
- 2016 Wimbledon Championships

Final
- Champion: (United States) Serena Williams
- Runner-up: (Germany) Angelique Kerber
- Score: 7–5, 6–3

Details
- Draw: 128 (12 Q / 6 WC )
- Seeds: 32

Events
Singles	men	women		boys	girls
Doubles	men	women	mixed	boys	girls
WC Singles	men	women	quad
WC Doubles	men	women	quad
Legends	men	women	seniors
← 2015 ·	Wimbledon Championships	· 2017 →

Defending champion Serena Williams defeated Angelique Kerber in the final, 7–5, 6–3 to win the ladies' singles tennis title at the 2016 Wimbledon Championships. It was her seventh and last Wimbledon singles title and 22nd major singles title overall, equaling Steffi Graf's Open Era record.

This was the first time two women contested multiple major finals in the same season since Amélie Mauresmo and Justine Henin-Hardenne met in the 2006 Australian Open and Wimbledon finals, as Williams and Kerber had contested the 2016 Australian Open final.

In addition to Williams and Kerber, Garbiñe Muguruza, Agnieszka Radwańska and Simona Halep were in contention for the world No. 1 singles ranking. Williams retained the top spot by reaching the fourth round. She also spent her 300th week atop the WTA rankings during the tournament, and won her 300th major match by defeating Annika Beck in the third round.

At 36 years old, Venus Williams was the oldest woman to reach a major semifinal since Martina Navratilova at the 1994 Wimbledon Championships.

== Seeds ==
1. (United States) Serena Williams (champion)
2. (Spain) Garbiñe Muguruza (second round)
3. (Poland) Agnieszka Radwańska (fourth round)
4. (Germany) Angelique Kerber (final)
5. (Romania) Simona Halep (quarterfinals)
6. (Italy) Roberta Vinci (third round)
7. (Switzerland) Belinda Bencic (second round, retired due to a wrist injury)
8. (United States) Venus Williams (semifinals)
9. (United States) Madison Keys (fourth round)
10. (Czech Republic) Petra Kvitová (second round)
11. (Switzerland) Timea Bacsinszky (third round)
12. (Spain) Carla Suárez Navarro (fourth round)
13. (Russia) Svetlana Kuznetsova (fourth round)
14. (Australia) Samantha Stosur (second round)
15. (Czech Republic) Karolína Plíšková (second round)
16. (United Kingdom) Johanna Konta (second round)

17. (Ukraine) Elina Svitolina (second round)
18. (United States) Sloane Stephens (third round)
19. (Slovakia) Dominika Cibulková (quarterfinals)
20. (Italy) Sara Errani (second round)
21. (Russia) Anastasia Pavlyuchenkova (quarterfinals)
22. (Serbia) Jelena Janković (second round)
23. (Serbia) Ana Ivanovic (first round)
24. (Czech Republic) Barbora Strýcová (third round)
25. (Romania) Irina-Camelia Begu (first round)
26. (Netherlands) Kiki Bertens (third round)
27. (United States) CoCo Vandeweghe (fourth round)
28. (Czech Republic) Lucie Šafářová (fourth round)
29. (Russia) Daria Kasatkina (third round)
30. (France) Caroline Garcia (second round)
31. (France) Kristina Mladenovic (first round)
32. (Germany) Andrea Petkovic (second round)

Click on the seed number of a player to go to their draw section.

== Draw ==
=== Key ===
- Q = Qualifier
- WC = Wild card
- LL = Lucky loser
- Alt = Alternate
- ITF = ITF entry
- PR = Protected ranking
- SR = Special ranking
- SE = Special exempt
- JE = Junior exempt
- JR = Junior Accelerator Programme entrant
- CO = College Accelerator Programme entrant
- NG = Next Gen Accelerator Program entrant
- w/o = Walkover
- r = Retired
- d = Defaulted

=== Finals ===
Quarterfinals
1	(United States) Serena Williams	6	6
21	(Russia) Anastasia Pavlyuchenkova	4	4
19	(Slovakia) Dominika Cibulková	2	2
(Russia) Elena Vesnina	6	6
5	(Romania) Simona Halep	5	6^{2}
4	(Germany) Angelique Kerber	7	7^{7}
8	(United States) Venus Williams	7^{7}	6
(Kazakhstan) Yaroslava Shvedova	6^{5}	2

Semifinals
1	(United States) Serena Williams	6	6
(Russia) Elena Vesnina	2	0
4	(Germany) Angelique Kerber	6	6
8	(United States) Venus Williams	4	4

Final
1	(United States) Serena Williams	7	6
4	(Germany) Angelique Kerber	5	3

=== Top half ===
==== Section 1 ====
First round
1	(United States) S Williams	6	6
Q	(Switzerland) A Sadiković	2	4
(United States) C McHale	7	6
WC	(Slovakia) D Hantuchová	5	2
(United Kingdom) H Watson	6	0	10
(Germany) A Beck	3	6	12
(Belarus) A Sasnovich	6	6
31	(France) K Mladenovic	3	3
18	(United States) S Stephens	7^{7}	6
PR	(China) S Peng	6^{5}	2
Q	(Luxembourg) M Minella	7	3
(United States) A Tatishvili	5	0^{r}
WC	(United Kingdom) T Moore	6	6
(Belgium) A Van Uytvanck	3	2
(Denmark) C Wozniacki	5	4
13	(Russia) S Kuznetsova	7	6

Second round
1	(United States) S Williams	6^{7}	6	6
(United States) C McHale	7^{9}	2	4
(Germany) A Beck	6	6
(Belarus) A Sasnovich	2	1
18	(United States) S Stephens	3	7^{8}	8
Q	(Luxembourg) M Minella	6	6^{6}	6
WC	(United Kingdom) T Moore	1	6	3
13	(Russia) S Kuznetsova	6	2	6

Third round
1	(United States) S Williams	6	6
(Germany) A Beck	3	0
18	(United States) S Stephens	7^{7}	2	6
13	(Russia) S Kuznetsova	6^{1}	6	8

Fourth round
1	(United States) S Williams	7	6
13	(Russia) S Kuznetsova	5	0

==== Section 2 ====
First round
11	(Switzerland) T Bacsinszky	6	6
Q	(Thailand) L Kumkhum	4	2
(Romania) M Niculescu	6	6
Q	(Serbia) A Krunić	1	4
(Kazakhstan) Y Putintseva	7	6
WC	(Russia) M Melnikova	5	2
(Chinese Taipei) S-w Hsieh	5	6	1
21	(Russia) A Pavlyuchenkova	7	1	6
27	(United States) C Vandeweghe	6	7^{7}
(Ukraine) K Bondarenko	2	6^{3}
WC	(United Kingdom) K Swan	2	3
(Hungary) T Babos	6	6
(Czech Republic) Kr Plíšková	3	6	5
LL	(China) Y Duan	6	3	7
(United States) A Riske	2	7	3
6	(Italy) R Vinci	6	5	6

Second round
11	(Switzerland) T Bacsinszky	4	6	6
(Romania) M Niculescu	6	2	1
(Kazakhstan) Y Putintseva	5	1
21	(Russia) A Pavlyuchenkova	7	6
27	(United States) C Vandeweghe	6	6
(Hungary) T Babos	2	3
LL	(China) Y Duan	3	5
6	(Italy) R Vinci	6	7

Third round
11	(Switzerland) T Bacsinszky	3	2
21	(Russia) A Pavlyuchenkova	6	6
27	(United States) C Vandeweghe	6	6
6	(Italy) R Vinci	3	4

Fourth round
21	(Russia) A Pavlyuchenkova	6	6
27	(United States) C Vandeweghe	3	3

==== Section 3 ====
First round
3	(Poland) A Radwańska	6	6
(Ukraine) K Kozlova	2	1
(Italy) K Knapp	3	3
(Croatia) A Konjuh	6	6
(France) P Parmentier	3	5
(Czech Republic) K Siniaková	6	7
(Turkey) Ç Büyükakçay	2	3
30	(France) C Garcia	6	6
19	(Slovakia) D Cibulková	7	6
(Croatia) M Lučić-Baroni	5	3
(Australia) D Gavrilova	2	6	6
(China) Q Wang	6	3	4
(Canada) E Bouchard	6	6
(Slovakia) M Rybáriková	3	4
(Puerto Rico) M Puig	1	5
16	(United Kingdom) J Konta	6	7

Second round
3	(Poland) A Radwańska	6	4	9
(Croatia) A Konjuh	2	6	7
(Czech Republic) K Siniaková	4	6	6
30	(France) C Garcia	6	4	1
19	(Slovakia) D Cibulková	6	6
(Australia) D Gavrilova	3	2
(Canada) E Bouchard	6	1	6
16	(United Kingdom) J Konta	3	6	1

Third round
3	(Poland) A Radwańska	6	6
(Czech Republic) K Siniaková	3	1
19	(Slovakia) D Cibulková	6	6
(Canada) E Bouchard	4	3

Fourth round
3	(Poland) A Radwańska	3	7	7
19	(Slovakia) D Cibulková	6	5	9

==== Section 4 ====
First round
10	(Czech Republic) P Kvitová	6	6
(Romania) S Cîrstea	0	4
(Russia) E Makarova	6	4	6
(Sweden) J Larsson	1	6	1
WC	(Russia) E Rodina	6	7
(Ukraine) L Tsurenko	3	5
(Estonia) A Kontaveit	6	4	4
24	(Czech Republic) B Strýcová	4	6	6
32	(Germany) A Petkovic	3	7	6
(Japan) N Hibino	6	5	2
(Russia) E Vesnina	7	6
Q	(Austria) T Paszek	5	2
Q	(United States) J Boserup	6	0	6
Q	(Germany) T Maria	4	6	2
(Bulgaria) T Pironkova	2	3
7	(Switzerland) B Bencic	6	6

Second round
10	(Czech Republic) P Kvitová	5	6^{5}
(Russia) E Makarova	7	7^{7}
WC	(Russia) E Rodina	4	0
24	(Czech Republic) B Strýcová	6	6
32	(Germany) A Petkovic	5	3
(Russia) E Vesnina	7	6
Q	(United States) J Boserup	6	1
7	(Switzerland) B Bencic	4	0^{r}

Third round
(Russia) E Makarova	6	6
24	(Czech Republic) B Strýcová	4	2
(Russia) E Vesnina	7	7
Q	(United States) J Boserup	5	5

Fourth round
(Russia) E Makarova	7	1	7
(Russia) E Vesnina	5	6	9

=== Bottom half ===
==== Section 5 ====
First round
5	(Romania) S Halep	6	6
(Slovakia) AK Schmiedlová	4	1
(Latvia) A Sevastova	6^{7}	4
(Italy) F Schiavone	7^{9}	6
(Montenegro) D Kovinić	2	6^{3}
(Germany) M Barthel	6	7^{7}
(Latvia) J Ostapenko	3	2
26	(Netherlands) K Bertens	6	6
20	(Italy) S Errani	6	6
(Romania) PM Țig	4	4
(France) A Cornet	6	6
(Slovenia) P Hercog	3	0
(United States) N Gibbs	3	1
(Belgium) K Flipkens	6	6
(Germany) L Siegemund	3	1
9	(United States) M Keys	6	6

Second round
5	(Romania) S Halep	6	6
(Italy) F Schiavone	1	1
(Germany) M Barthel	4	4
26	(Netherlands) K Bertens	6	6
20	(Italy) S Errani	6^{4}	5
(France) A Cornet	7^{7}	7
(Belgium) K Flipkens	4	6	3
9	(United States) M Keys	6	4	6

Third round
5	(Romania) S Halep	6	6
26	(Netherlands) K Bertens	4	3
(France) A Cornet	4	7	2
9	(United States) M Keys	6	5	6

Fourth round
5	(Romania) S Halep	6^{5}	6	6
9	(United States) M Keys	7^{7}	4	3

==== Section 6 ====
First round
15	(Czech Republic) Ka Plíšková	6	0	8
(Belgium) Y Wickmayer	2	6	6
(Japan) M Doi	6	6
(United States) L Chirico	1	2
(Kazakhstan) Z Diyas	4	0
(Germany) A-L Friedsam	6	6
Q	(Russia) E Alexandrova	6	7
23	(Serbia) A Ivanovic	2	5
25	(Romania) I-C Begu	1	4
(Germany) C Witthöft	6	6
(Japan) K Nara	6	6^{5}	6
(United States) M Brengle	2	7^{7}	3
(Brazil) T Pereira	7	6^{3}	2
(United States) V Lepchenko	5	7^{7}	6
WC	(United Kingdom) L Robson	2	2
4	(Germany) A Kerber	6	6

Second round
15	(Czech Republic) Ka Plíšková	6^{5}	3
(Japan) M Doi	7^{7}	6
(Germany) A-L Friedsam	6	7^{7}
Q	(Russia) E Alexandrova	4	6^{1}
(Germany) C Witthöft	6	6
(Japan) K Nara	3	0
(United States) V Lepchenko	1	4
4	(Germany) A Kerber	6	6

Third round
(Japan) M Doi	7^{7}	6
(Germany) A-L Friedsam	6^{1}	3
(Germany) C Witthöft	6^{11}	1
4	(Germany) A Kerber	7^{13}	6

Fourth round
(Japan) M Doi	3	1
4	(Germany) A Kerber	6	6

==== Section 7 ====
First round
8	(United States) V Williams	7^{7}	6
(Croatia) D Vekić	6^{3}	4
(China) S Zheng	3	2
Q	(Greece) M Sakkari	6	6
(Spain) L Arruabarrena	6	1	8
(Belarus) O Govortsova	2	6	6
PR	(United States) V Duval	0	5
29	(Russia) D Kasatkina	6	7
22	(Serbia) J Janković	6	6
(Switzerland) S Vögele	2	2
(United States) I Falconi	6	3	8
Q	(New Zealand) M Erakovic	4	6	10
(Russia) M Gasparyan	3	0^{r}
(Czech Republic) D Allertová	6	3
(China) S Zhang	3	6	4
12	(Spain) C Suárez Navarro	6	4	6

Second round
8	(United States) V Williams	7	4	6
Q	(Greece) M Sakkari	5	6	3
(Spain) L Arruabarrena	6^{9}	3
29	(Russia) D Kasatkina	7^{11}	6
22	(Serbia) J Janković	6	6^{1}	6
Q	(New Zealand) M Erakovic	4	7^{7}	8
(Czech Republic) D Allertová	6	2	1
12	(Spain) C Suárez Navarro	3	6	6

Third round
8	(United States) V Williams	7	4	10
29	(Russia) D Kasatkina	5	6	8
Q	(New Zealand) M Erakovic	2	2
12	(Spain) C Suárez Navarro	6	6

Fourth round
8	(United States) V Williams	7^{7}	6
12	(Spain) C Suárez Navarro	6^{3}	4

==== Section 8 ====
First round
14	(Australia) S Stosur	7	6
(Poland) M Linette	5	3
(Germany) S Lisicki	6	6
(United States) S Rogers	1	3
(Kazakhstan) Y Shvedova	7	6
(Germany) J Görges	5	4
(United Kingdom) N Broady	2	3
17	(Ukraine) E Svitolina	6	6
28	(Czech Republic) L Šafářová	6^{7}	7^{7}	7
(United States) B Mattek-Sands	7^{9}	6^{3}	5
(United States) S Crawford	7	6
Q	(Poland) P Kania	5	3
Q	(Slovakia) J Čepelová	7	7
(Colombia) M Duque Mariño	5	5
(Italy) C Giorgi	2	7	4
2	(Spain) G Muguruza	6	5	6

Second round
14	(Australia) S Stosur	4	2
(Germany) S Lisicki	6	6
(Kazakhstan) Y Shvedova	6	3	6
17	(Ukraine) E Svitolina	2	6	4
28	(Czech Republic) L Šafářová	6	6
(United States) S Crawford	3	4
Q	(Slovakia) J Čepelová	6	6
2	(Spain) G Muguruza	3	2

Third round
(Germany) S Lisicki	6^{2}	1
(Kazakhstan) Y Shvedova	7^{7}	6
28	(Czech Republic) L Šafářová	4	6	12
Q	(Slovakia) J Čepelová	6	1	10

Fourth round
(Kazakhstan) Y Shvedova	6	6
28	(Czech Republic) L Šafářová	2	4

== Championship match statistics ==
Category	(United States) S. Williams	(Germany) Kerber
1st serve %	43/66 (65%)	44/66 (67%)
1st serve points won	38 of 43 = 88%	26 of 44 = 59%
2nd serve points won	9 of 23 = 39%	15 of 22 = 68%
Total service points won	47 of 66 = 71.21%	41 of 66 = 62.12%
Aces	13	0
Double faults	3	1
Winners	39	12
Unforced errors	21	9
Net points won	16 of 21 = 76%	1 of 1 = 100%
Break points converted	2 of 6 = 33%	0 of 1 = 0%
Return points won	25 of 66 = 38%	19 of 66 = 29%
Total points won	72	60

Preceded by 2016 French Open – Women's singles	Grand Slams; Women's Singles	Succeeded by 2016 US Open – Women's singles
