= 2016 Wimbledon Championships – Men's singles =

Men's singles
- 2016 Wimbledon Championships

Final
- Champion: (United Kingdom) Andy Murray
- Runner-up: (Canada) Milos Raonic
- Score: 6–4, 7–6^{(7–3)}, 7–6^{(7–2)}

Details
- Draw: 128 (16 Q / 6 WC )
- Seeds: 32

Events
Singles	men	women		boys	girls
Doubles	men	women	mixed	boys	girls
WC Singles	men	women	quad
WC Doubles	men	women	quad
Legends	men	women	seniors
← 2015 ·	Wimbledon Championships	· 2017 →

Andy Murray defeated Milos Raonic in the final, 6–4, 7–6^{(7–3)}, 7–6^{(7–2)} to win the gentlemen's singles tennis title at the 2016 Wimbledon Championships. It was his second Wimbledon title and third and last major title overall. Raonic was the first Canadian man to reach a major singles final. He was the first non-European to reach the Wimbledon final since Andy Roddick in 2009, and the first man born in the 1990s to reach a major final.

Novak Djokovic was the two-time defending champion, but lost in the third round to Sam Querrey. This was Djokovic's first defeat before the quarterfinals of a major since the 2009 French Open. The defeat ended his streak of four consecutive major titles, dating to the 2015 Wimbledon Championships, and also snapped his 30-match win streak at the majors.

Querrey was the first American man to reach the quarterfinals at a singles major since John Isner and Andy Roddick at the 2011 US Open.

Semifinalist and seven-time Wimbledon champion Roger Federer did not play tennis for the rest of the season due to knee and back injuries.

== Seeds ==
All seedings per modified ATP rankings.

1. (Serbia) Novak Djokovic (third round)
2. (United Kingdom) Andy Murray (champion)
3. (Switzerland) Roger Federer (semifinals)
4. (Switzerland) Stan Wawrinka (second round)
5. (Japan) Kei Nishikori (fourth round, retired due to a rib injury)
6. (Canada) Milos Raonic (final)
7. (France) Richard Gasquet (fourth round, retired due to a back injury)
8. (Austria) Dominic Thiem (second round)
9. (Croatia) Marin Čilić (quarterfinals)
10. (Czech Republic) Tomáš Berdych (semifinals)
11. (Belgium) David Goffin (fourth round)
12. (France) Jo-Wilfried Tsonga (quarterfinals)
13. (Spain) David Ferrer (second round)
14. (Spain) Roberto Bautista Agut (third round)
15. (Australia) Nick Kyrgios (fourth round)
16. (France) Gilles Simon (second round)

17. (France) Gaël Monfils (first round)
18. (United States) John Isner (third round)
19. (Australia) Bernard Tomic (fourth round)
20. (South Africa) Kevin Anderson (first round)
21. (Germany) Philipp Kohlschreiber (first round)
22. (Spain) Feliciano López (third round)
23. (Croatia) Ivo Karlović (second round)
24. (Germany) Alexander Zverev (third round)
25. (Serbia) Viktor Troicki (second round)
26. (France) Benoît Paire (second round)
27. (United States) Jack Sock (third round)
28. (United States) Sam Querrey (quarterfinals)
29. (Uruguay) Pablo Cuevas (first round)
30. (Ukraine) Alexandr Dolgopolov (second round)
31. (Portugal) João Sousa (third round)
32. (France) Lucas Pouille (quarterfinals)

Click on the seed number of a player to go to their draw section.

== Draw ==
=== Key ===
- Q = Qualifier
- WC = Wild card
- LL = Lucky loser
- Alt = Alternate
- ITF = ITF entry
- PR = Protected ranking
- SR = Special ranking
- SE = Special exempt
- JE = Junior exempt
- JR = Junior Accelerator Programme entrant
- CO = College Accelerator Programme entrant
- NG = Next Gen Accelerator Program entrant
- w/o = Walkover
- r = Retired
- d = Defaulted

=== Finals ===
Quarterfinals
28	(United States) Sam Querrey	4	5	7	4
6	(Canada) Milos Raonic	6	7	5	6
3	(Switzerland) Roger Federer	6^{4}	4	6	7^{11}	6
9	(Croatia) Marin Čilić	7^{7}	6	3	6^{9}	3
10	(Czech Republic) Tomáš Berdych	7^{7}	6	6
32	(France) Lucas Pouille	6^{4}	3	2
12	(France) Jo-Wilfried Tsonga	6^{10}	1	6	6	1
2	(United Kingdom) Andy Murray	7^{12}	6	3	4	6

Semifinals
6	(Canada) Milos Raonic	6	6^{3}	4	7	6
3	(Switzerland) Roger Federer	3	7^{7}	6	5	3
10	(Czech Republic) Tomáš Berdych	3	3	3
2	(United Kingdom) Andy Murray	6	6	6

Final
6	(Canada) Milos Raonic	4	6^{3}	6^{2}
2	(United Kingdom) Andy Murray	6	7^{7}	7^{7}

=== Top half ===
==== Section 1 ====
First round
1	(Serbia) N Djokovic	6	7^{7}	6
WC	(United Kingdom) J Ward	0	6^{3}	4
(United Kingdom) K Edmund	2	5	4
(France) A Mannarino	6	7	6
(Brazil) T Bellucci	3	6	6	1	8
Q	(Belgium) R Bemelmans	6	4	3	6	6
(Czech Republic) L Rosol	7^{8}	7^{7}	4	2	10
28	(United States) S Querrey	6^{6}	6^{5}	6	6	12
21	(Germany) P Kohlschreiber	5	3	6	3
(France) P-H Herbert	7	6	3	6
(Bosnia and Herzegovina) D Džumhur	7^{7}	7	2	1	6
(United States) D Kudla	6^{5}	5	6	6	3
WC	(United Kingdom) B Klein	6^{0}	4	4
(France) N Mahut	7^{7}	6	6
(Israel) D Sela	2	1	1
13	(Spain) D Ferrer	6	6	6

Second round
1	(Serbia) N Djokovic	6	6	7^{7}
(France) A Mannarino	4	3	6^{5}
(Brazil) T Bellucci	4	3	2
28	(United States) S Querrey	6	6	6
(France) P-H Herbert	3	7^{7}	7^{7}	6
(Bosnia and Herzegovina) D Džumhur	6	6^{1}	6^{0}	2
(France) N Mahut	6	6	6
13	(Spain) D Ferrer	1	4	3

Third round
1	(Serbia) N Djokovic	6^{6}	1	6	6^{5}
28	(United States) S Querrey	7^{8}	6	3	7^{7}
(France) P-H Herbert	6^{5}	4	6	3
(France) N Mahut	7^{7}	6	3	6

Fourth round
28	(United States) S Querrey	6	7^{7}	6
(France) N Mahut	4	6^{5}	4

==== Section 2 ====
First round
11	(Belgium) D Goffin	6	6	6
WC	(United Kingdom) A Ward	2	3	2
Q	(France) É Roger-Vasselin	1	6	6	6
(Russia) T Gabashvili	6	3	4	4
(Spain) N Almagro	6	7^{8}	5	3	6
(Brazil) R Dutra Silva	3	6^{6}	7	6	3
(Uzbekistan) D Istomin	4	6^{13}	6	7^{7}	6
20	(South Africa) K Anderson	6	7^{15}	4	6^{2}	3
27	(United States) J Sock	6	6	6
(Latvia) E Gulbis	4	4	4
(Argentina) D Schwartzman	6	2	3	6	5
(Netherlands) R Haase	2	6	6	2	7
(Italy) A Seppi	6	6	6
(Spain) G García-López	2	4	0
(Spain) P Carreño Busta	6^{4}	2	4
6	(Canada) M Raonic	7^{7}	6	6

Second round
11	(Belgium) D Goffin	6	6	6
Q	(France) É Roger-Vasselin	4	0	3
(Spain) N Almagro	4	6^{5}	2
(Uzbekistan) D Istomin	6	7^{7}	6
27	(United States) J Sock	6	6	6^{3}	6
(Netherlands) R Haase	1	3	7^{7}	4
(Italy) A Seppi	6^{5}	4	2
6	(Canada) M Raonic	7^{7}	6	6

Third round
11	(Belgium) D Goffin	6	6	2	6
(Uzbekistan) D Istomin	4	3	6	1
27	(United States) J Sock	6^{2}	4	6^{1}
6	(Canada) M Raonic	7^{7}	6	7^{7}

Fourth round
11	(Belgium) D Goffin	6	6	4	4	4
6	(Canada) M Raonic	4	3	6	6	6

==== Section 3 ====
First round
3	(Switzerland) R Federer	7^{7}	7^{7}	6
(Argentina) G Pella	6^{5}	6^{3}	3
(Lithuania) R Berankis	3	3	4
Q	(United Kingdom) M Willis	6	6	6
(United Kingdom) D Evans	6	6^{6}	7^{9}	7
(Germany) J-L Struff	3	7^{8}	6^{7}	5
(Russia) E Donskoy	2	4	6	6^{3}
30	(Ukraine) A Dolgopolov	6	6	3	7^{7}
17	(France) G Monfils	7^{7}	0	6	1	2
(France) J Chardy	6^{4}	6	4	6	6
(Tunisia) M Jaziri	5	6^{2}	4
(United States) S Johnson	7	7^{7}	6
Q	(United States) B Fratangelo	3	4	2
(Bulgaria) G Dimitrov	6	6	6
PR	(Serbia) J Tipsarević	6	4	5	3
16	(France) G Simon	4	6	7	6

Second round
3	(Switzerland) R Federer	6	6	6
Q	(United Kingdom) M Willis	0	3	4
(United Kingdom) D Evans	7^{8}	6	6
30	(Ukraine) A Dolgopolov	6^{6}	4	1
(France) J Chardy	1	6^{6}	3
(United States) S Johnson	6	7^{8}	6
(Bulgaria) G Dimitrov	6	7^{7}	4	6
16	(France) G Simon	3	6^{1}	6	4

Third round
3	(Switzerland) R Federer	6	6	6
(United Kingdom) D Evans	4	2	2
(United States) S Johnson	6^{6}	7^{7}	6	6
(Bulgaria) G Dimitrov	7^{8}	6^{3}	4	2

Fourth round
3	(Switzerland) R Federer	6	6	7
(United States) S Johnson	2	3	5

==== Section 4 ====
First round
9	(Croatia) M Čilić	6	7	6
PR	(United States) B Baker	3	5	3
(Ukraine) S Stakhovsky	6	6	6
Q	(Japan) Y Nishioka	3	4	4
(Italy) P Lorenzi	4	7^{7}	5	3
Q	(Slovakia) L Lacko	6	6^{5}	7	6
(Croatia) B Ćorić	6^{8}	6^{7}	4
23	(Croatia) I Karlović	7^{10}	7^{9}	6
29	(Uruguay) P Cuevas	3	6	7	3	4
(Russia) A Kuznetsov	6	3	5	6	6
(Colombia) S Giraldo	6	7^{7}	6^{5}	3	13
(Luxembourg) G Müller	4	6^{3}	7^{7}	6	15
PR	(France) J Benneteau	6	6	7^{10}
(Ukraine) I Marchenko	4	2	6^{8}
(Australia) S Groth	4	3	5
5	(Japan) K Nishikori	6	6	7

Second round
9	(Croatia) M Čilić	6	6^{6}	6	6
(Ukraine) S Stakhovsky	2	7^{8}	4	4
Q	(Slovakia) L Lacko	6	3	7^{7}	6
23	(Croatia) I Karlović	3	6	6^{5}	4
(Russia) A Kuznetsov	6	6	6
(Luxembourg) G Müller	3	4	4
PR	(France) J Benneteau	6	4	4	2
5	(Japan) K Nishikori	4	6	6	6

Third round
9	(Croatia) M Čilić	6	6	6
Q	(Slovakia) L Lacko	3	3	4
(Russia) A Kuznetsov	5	3	5
5	(Japan) K Nishikori	7	6	7

Fourth round
9	(Croatia) M Čilić	6	5
5	(Japan) K Nishikori	1	1^{r}

=== Bottom half ===
==== Section 5 ====
First round
8	(Austria) D Thiem	7	6	6
PR	(Germany) F Mayer	5	4	4
(Czech Republic) J Veselý	6	6	7^{9}
Q	(Netherlands) I Sijsling	2	4	6^{7}
Q	(Australia) L Saville	6	4	5	4
Q	(United States) D Novikov	4	6	7	6
PR	(Russia) D Tursunov	6	6^{2}	6	3	5
31	(Portugal) J Sousa	3	7^{7}	4	6	7
24	(Germany) A Zverev	6	6	6
(France) P-H Mathieu	3	4	2
(Argentina) H Zeballos	4	4	6	1
(Russia) M Youzhny	6	6	3	6
(Germany) B Becker	6	6	6
(Argentina) F Bagnis	3	3	1
(Croatia) I Dodig	6^{5}	7	1	6^{2}
10	(Czech Republic) T Berdych	7^{7}	5	6	7^{7}

Second round
8	(Austria) D Thiem	6^{4}	6^{5}	6^{3}
(Czech Republic) J Veselý	7^{7}	7^{7}	7^{7}
Q	(United States) D Novikov	4	4	6	4
31	(Portugal) J Sousa	6	6	3	6
24	(Germany) A Zverev	6	3	6	4	6
(Russia) M Youzhny	4	6	0	6	2
(Germany) B Becker	4	1	2
10	(Czech Republic) T Berdych	6	6	6

Third round
(Czech Republic) J Veselý	6	6	7
31	(Portugal) J Sousa	2	2	5
24	(Germany) A Zverev	3	4	6	1
10	(Czech Republic) T Berdych	6	6	4	6

Fourth round
(Czech Republic) J Veselý	6	3	6^{8}	7^{11}	3
10	(Czech Republic) T Berdych	4	6	7^{10}	6^{9}	6

==== Section 6 ====
First round
14	(Spain) R Bautista Agut	6	6	6
(Australia) J Thompson	3	3	3
(Kazakhstan) M Kukushkin	7^{9}	7^{7}	6
(Slovakia) M Kližan	6^{7}	6^{5}	4
(Portugal) G Elias	6	2	5	4
Q	(Moldova) R Albot	3	6	7	6
(Spain) F Verdasco	6	3	3	6	4
19	(Australia) B Tomic	4	6	6	3	6
32	(France) L Pouille	6	4	6	6
Q	(Romania) M Copil	4	6	4	1
(United States) D Young	6	7	3	6
(Argentina) L Mayer	4	5	6	3
(France) S Robert	1	5	0
PR	(Argentina) JM del Potro	6	7	6
(United States) T Fritz	6^{4}	1	7^{7}	4
4	(Switzerland) S Wawrinka	7^{7}	6	6^{2}	6

Second round
14	(Spain) R Bautista Agut	w/o
(Kazakhstan) M Kukushkin
Q	(Moldova) R Albot	6^{3}	3	7^{8}	3
19	(Australia) B Tomic	7^{7}	6	6^{6}	6
32	(France) L Pouille	6	6	6
(United States) D Young	4	3	3
PR	(Argentina) JM del Potro	3	6	7^{7}	6
4	(Switzerland) S Wawrinka	6	3	6^{2}	3

Third round
14	(Spain) R Bautista Agut	2	4	4
19	(Australia) B Tomic	6	6	6
32	(France) L Pouille	6^{4}	7^{8}	7	6
PR	(Argentina) JM del Potro	7^{7}	6^{6}	5	1

Fourth round
19	(Australia) B Tomic	4	6	6	4	8
32	(France) L Pouille	6	4	3	6	10

==== Section 7 ====
First round
7	(France) R Gasquet	6	6	6
(United Kingdom) A Bedene	3	4	3
(Spain) M Granollers	6	6	2	6
(Dominican Republic) V Estrella Burgos	2	4	6	4
(Canada) V Pospisil	4	6	3	4
(Spain) A Ramos-Viñolas	6	3	6	6
Q	(France) T Lamasine	4	2	2
25	(Serbia) V Troicki	6	6	6
18	(United States) J Isner	7^{7}	7^{7}	6
(Cyprus) M Baghdatis	6^{2}	6^{5}	3
Q	(France) A Olivetti	7^{9}	6^{5}	3	7^{7}	12
Q	(Australia) M Barton	6^{7}	7^{7}	6	6^{5}	14
(Japan) T Daniel	5	6	3	2
(Argentina) J Mónaco	7	4	6	6
(Spain) Í Cervantes	4	6^{5}	4
12	(France) J-W Tsonga	6	7^{7}	6

Second round
7	(France) R Gasquet	4	7	6	6
(Spain) M Granollers	6	5	3	1
(Spain) A Ramos-Viñolas	3	6	6	2	6
25	(Serbia) V Troicki	6	3	3	6	3
18	(United States) J Isner	7^{10}	7^{7}	7^{10}
Q	(Australia) M Barton	6^{8}	6^{3}	6^{8}
(Argentina) J Mónaco	1	4	3
12	(France) J-W Tsonga	6	6	6

Third round
7	(France) R Gasquet	2	7^{7}	6	6
(Spain) A Ramos-Viñolas	6	6^{5}	2	3
18	(United States) J Isner	7^{7}	6	6^{5}	2	17
12	(France) J-W Tsonga	6^{3}	3	7^{7}	6	19

Fourth round
7	(France) R Gasquet	2^{r}
12	(France) J-W Tsonga	4

==== Section 8 ====
First round
15	(Australia) N Kyrgios	6	6	6^{9}	6
WC	(Czech Republic) R Štěpánek	4	3	7^{11}	1
(Serbia) D Lajović	6	3	6	3	4
WC	(Germany) D Brown	4	6	3	6	6
(Argentina) F Delbonis	4	6	7^{7}	2	3
(Italy) F Fognini	6	1	6^{3}	6	6
(United States) R Ram	6^{5}	4	4
22	(Spain) F López	7^{7}	6	6
26	(France) B Paire	3	7^{7}	2	6	10
Q	(Croatia) F Škugor	6	6^{2}	6	3	8
(Australia) J Millman	7	4	5	6	6
(Spain) A Montañés	5	6	7	4	3
PR	(Chinese Taipei) Y-h Lu	6	6	6
Q	(Russia) A Kudryavtsev	4	1	4
WC	(United Kingdom) L Broady	2	3	4
2	(United Kingdom) A Murray	6	6	6

Second round
15	(Australia) N Kyrgios	6^{3}	6	2	6	6
WC	(Germany) D Brown	7^{7}	1	6	4	4
(Italy) F Fognini	6	7^{7}	3	3	3
22	(Spain) F López	3	6^{5}	6	6	6
26	(France) B Paire	6^{5}	3	6	2
(Australia) J Millman	7^{7}	6	4	6
PR	(Chinese Taipei) Y-h Lu	3	2	1
2	(United Kingdom) A Murray	6	6	6

Third round
15	(Australia) N Kyrgios	6	6^{2}	6	6
22	(Spain) F López	3	7^{7}	3	4
(Australia) J Millman	3	5	2
2	(United Kingdom) A Murray	6	7	6

Fourth round
15	(Australia) N Kyrgios	5	1	4
2	(United Kingdom) A Murray	7	6	6

Preceded by 2016 French Open – Men's singles	Grand Slam men's singles	Succeeded by 2016 US Open – Men's singles
