= 2016 Wimbledon Championships – Men's doubles =

Men's doubles
- 2016 Wimbledon Championships

Final
- Champions: (France) Pierre-Hugues Herbert (France) Nicolas Mahut
- Runners-up: (France) Julien Benneteau (France) Édouard Roger-Vasselin
- Score: 6–4, 7–6^{(7–1)}, 6–3

Details
- Draw: 64
- Seeds: 16

Events
| Singles | men | women | | boys | girls |
| Doubles | men | women | mixed | boys | girls |
| WC Singles | men | women | quad |
| WC Doubles | men | women | quad |
| Legends | men | women | seniors |
| ← 2015 · | Wimbledon Championships | · 2017 → |

Jean-Julien Rojer and Horia Tecău were the defending champions, but lost in the first round to Jonathan Marray and Adil Shamasdin.

Pierre-Hugues Herbert and Nicolas Mahut won the title, defeating Julien Benneteau and Édouard Roger-Vasselin in the final, 6–4, 7–6^{(7–1)}, 6–3. This was the first all-French men's doubles final at Wimbledon.

Due to inclement weather, all first and second round matches were best-of-three sets instead of best-of-five.

== Seeds ==
1. (France) Pierre-Hugues Herbert / (France) Nicolas Mahut (champions)
2. (United States) Bob Bryan / (United States) Mike Bryan (quarterfinals)
3. (United Kingdom) Jamie Murray / (Brazil) Bruno Soares (quarterfinals)
4. (Netherlands) Jean-Julien Rojer / (Romania) Horia Tecău (first round)
5. (Croatia) Ivan Dodig / (Brazil) Marcelo Melo (third round)
6. (India) Rohan Bopanna / (Romania) Florin Mergea (third round)
7. (Poland) Łukasz Kubot / (Austria) Alexander Peya (first round)
8. (Canada) Vasek Pospisil / (United States) Jack Sock (third round)

9. (United Kingdom) Dominic Inglot / (Canada) Daniel Nestor (second round)
10. (Finland) Henri Kontinen / (Australia) John Peers (quarterfinals)
11. (South Africa) Raven Klaasen / (United States) Rajeev Ram (semifinals)
12. (Philippines) Treat Huey / (Belarus) Max Mirnyi (semifinals)
13. (Colombia) Juan Sebastián Cabal / (Colombia) Robert Farah (second round)
14. (Czech Republic) Radek Štěpánek / (Serbia) Nenad Zimonjić (third round)
15. (Uruguay) Pablo Cuevas / (Spain) Marcel Granollers (third round)
16. (Croatia) Mate Pavić / (New Zealand) Michael Venus (third round)

Click on the seed number of a player to go to their draw section.

== Draw ==
=== Key ===
- Q = Qualifier
- WC = Wild card
- LL = Lucky loser
- Alt = Alternate
- ITF = ITF entry
- PR = Protected ranking
- SR = Special ranking
- SE = Special exempt
- JE = Junior exempt
- JR = Junior Accelerator Programme entrant
- CO = College Accelerator Programme entrant
- NG = Next Gen Accelerator Program entrant
- w/o = Walkover
- r = Retired
- d = Defaulted

=== Finals ===
Quarterfinals
1 | (France) Pierre-Hugues Herbert (France) Nicolas Mahut | 6 | 6^{6} | 6 | 7^{10}
10 | (Finland) Henri Kontinen (Australia) John Peers | 4 | 7^{8} | 4 | 6^{8}
WC | (United Kingdom) Jonathan Marray (Canada) Adil Shamasdin | 4 | 6^{5} | 3
12 | (Philippines) Treat Huey (Belarus) Max Mirnyi | 6 | 7^{7} | 6
(France) Julien Benneteau (France) Édouard Roger-Vasselin | 6 | 6 | 6^{11} | 6^{1} | 10
3 | (United Kingdom) Jamie Murray (Brazil) Bruno Soares | 4 | 4 | 7^{13} | 7^{7} | 8
11 | (South Africa) Raven Klaasen (United States) Rajeev Ram | 7^{7} | 6 | 7^{7}
2 | (United States) Bob Bryan (United States) Mike Bryan | 6^{2} | 1 | 6^{4}

Semifinals
1 | (France) Pierre-Hugues Herbert (France) Nicolas Mahut | 6 | 3 | 6^{3} | 6 | 6
12 | (Philippines) Treat Huey (Belarus) Max Mirnyi | 4 | 6 | 7^{7} | 4 | 4
(France) Julien Benneteau (France) Édouard Roger-Vasselin | 7 | 6 | 5 | 7^{7}
11 | (South Africa) Raven Klaasen (United States) Rajeev Ram | 5 | 4 | 7 | 6^{5}

Final
1 | (France) Pierre-Hugues Herbert (France) Nicolas Mahut | 6 | 7^{7} | 6
(France) Julien Benneteau (France) Édouard Roger-Vasselin | 4 | 6^{1} | 3

=== Top half ===
==== Section 1 ====
First round
1 | (France) P-H Herbert (France) N Mahut | 6 | 0
(France) A Mannarino (France) L Pouille | 4 | 0^{r}
(France) S Robert (Israel) D Sela | 6^{4} | 6 | 6
(Cyprus) M Baghdatis (Russia) M Youzhny | 7^{7} | 2 | 3
(Argentina) L Mayer (Portugal) J Sousa | 3 | 0^{r}
(Australia) S Groth (Sweden) R Lindstedt | 6 | 0
PR | (United States) B Baker (New Zealand) M Daniell | 6 | 6^{2} | 3
13 | (Colombia) JS Cabal (Colombia) R Farah | 3 | 7^{7} | 6
10 | (Finland) H Kontinen (Australia) J Peers | 6 | 6
(United States) N Monroe (United States) D Young | 4 | 3
PR | (Chinese Taipei) Y-h Lu (Serbia) J Tipsarević | 1 | 3
(Poland) M Matkowski (India) L Paes | 6 | 6
(Sweden) J Brunström (Sweden) A Siljeström | 3 | 7^{7} | 6
(Slovakia) A Martin (Chile) H Podlipnik-Castillo | 6 | 6^{4} | 8
(Croatia) M Draganja (Croatia) N Mektić | 5 | 6^{6}
6 | (India) R Bopanna (Romania) F Mergea | 7 | 7^{8}

Second round
1 | (France) P-H Herbert (France) N Mahut | 6 | 6
(France) S Robert (Israel) D Sela | 1 | 3
(Australia) S Groth (Sweden) R Lindstedt | 6^{4} | 6 | 6
13 | (Colombia) JS Cabal (Colombia) R Farah | 7^{7} | 4 | 4
10 | (Finland) H Kontinen (Australia) J Peers | 6 | 6
(Poland) M Matkowski (India) L Paes | 3 | 2
(Slovakia) A Martin (Chile) H Podlipnik-Castillo | 5 | 2
6 | (India) R Bopanna (Romania) F Mergea | 7 | 6

Third round
1 | (France) P-H Herbert (France) N Mahut | 7 | 3 | 7^{7} | 6
(Australia) S Groth (Sweden) R Lindstedt | 5 | 6 | 6^{4} | 3
10 | (Finland) H Kontinen (Australia) J Peers | 2 | 6 | 6 | 6^{6} | 8
6 | (India) R Bopanna (Romania) F Mergea | 6 | 3 | 4 | 7^{8} | 6

Quarterfinals
1 | (France) P-H Herbert (France) N Mahut | 6 | 6^{6} | 6 | 7^{10}
10 | (Finland) H Kontinen (Australia) J Peers | 4 | 7^{8} | 4 | 6^{8}

==== Section 2 ====
First round
4 | (Netherlands) J-J Rojer (Romania) H Tecău | 2 | 6^{3}
WC | (United Kingdom) J Marray (Canada) A Shamasdin | 6 | 7^{7}
(Argentina) A Molteni (Chile) J Peralta | 4 | 4
Q | (Germany) D Brown (Germany) J-L Struff | 6 | 6
(Netherlands) W Koolhof (Netherlands) M Middelkoop | 6 | 3 | 6
(Belarus) A Bury (Slovakia) I Zelenay | 3 | 6 | 3
WC | (United Kingdom) B Klein (United Kingdom) A Ward | 4 | 5
15 | (Uruguay) P Cuevas (Spain) M Granollers | 6 | 7
12 | (Philippines) T Huey (Belarus) M Mirnyi | 6 | 7^{7}
(Spain) P Carreño Busta (Spain) G García-López | 3 | 6^{5}
(Austria) J Knowle (New Zealand) A Sitak | 6^{4} | 3
(Brazil) M Demoliner (Pakistan) A-u-H Qureshi | 7^{7} | 6
LL | (Thailand) Sa Ratiwatana (Thailand) So Ratiwatana | 6 | 3 | 3
(Austria) O Marach (France) F Martin | 4 | 6 | 6
WC | (United Kingdom) K Skupski (United Kingdom) N Skupski | 2 | 7^{9} | 11
7 | (Poland) Ł Kubot (Austria) A Peya | 6 | 6^{7} | 9

Second round
WC | (United Kingdom) J Marray (Canada) A Shamasdin | 6 | 6
Q | (Germany) D Brown (Germany) J-L Struff | 3 | 4
(Netherlands) W Koolhof (Netherlands) M Middelkoop | 4 | 6 | 1
15 | (Uruguay) P Cuevas (Spain) M Granollers | 6 | 3 | 6
12 | (Philippines) T Huey (Belarus) M Mirnyi | 6 | 6^{7} | 6
(Brazil) M Demoliner (Pakistan) A-u-H Qureshi | 4 | 7^{9} | 3
(Austria) O Marach (France) F Martin | 5 | 6 | 6
WC | (United Kingdom) K Skupski (United Kingdom) N Skupski | 7 | 2 | 4

Third round
WC | (United Kingdom) J Marray (Canada) A Shamasdin | 6 | 4 | 6 | 3 | 14
15 | (Uruguay) P Cuevas (Spain) M Granollers | 3 | 6 | 4 | 6 | 12
12 | (Philippines) T Huey (Belarus) M Mirnyi | 6 | 6 | 7^{7}
(Austria) O Marach (France) F Martin | 3 | 2 | 6^{3}

Quarterfinals
WC | (United Kingdom) J Marray (Canada) A Shamasdin | 4 | 6^{5} | 3
12 | (Philippines) T Huey (Belarus) M Mirnyi | 6 | 7^{7} | 6

=== Bottom half ===
==== Section 3 ====
First round
8 | (Canada) V Pospisil (United States) J Sock | 7^{7} | 6^{6} | 6
Q | (France) Q Halys (France) T Lamasine | 6^{3} | 7^{8} | 4
WC | (Australia) L Hewitt (Australia) J Thompson | 6^{6} | 6 | 19
(Spain) N Almagro (Spain) D Marrero | 7^{8} | 4 | 17
(France) J Benneteau (France) É Roger-Vasselin | 6 | 6
(Spain) M López (Spain) A Ramos-Viñolas | 3 | 3
(Italy) F Fognini (Italy) A Seppi | 2 | 6^{2}
9 | (United Kingdom) D Inglot (Canada) D Nestor | 6 | 7^{7}
16 | (Croatia) M Pavić (New Zealand) M Venus | 7^{7} | 6
(Australia) C Guccione (Brazil) A Sá | 6^{3} | 3
(Argentina) G Pella (Argentina) H Zeballos | 4 | 4
(Argentina) G Durán (Argentina) M González | 6 | 6
WC | (United Kingdom) K Edmund (United Kingdom) J Ward | 7^{7} | 3 | 4
(Argentina) F Delbonis (Argentina) D Schwartzman | 6^{1} | 6 | 6
(Israel) J Erlich (United Kingdom) C Fleming | 2 | 7^{11} | 3
3 | (United Kingdom) J Murray (Brazil) B Soares | 6 | 6^{9} | 6

Second round
8 | (Canada) V Pospisil (United States) J Sock | 6 | 6
WC | (Australia) L Hewitt (Australia) J Thompson | 4 | 4
(France) J Benneteau (France) É Roger-Vasselin | 7^{7} | 6
9 | (United Kingdom) D Inglot (Canada) D Nestor | 6^{0} | 4
16 | (Croatia) M Pavić (New Zealand) M Venus | 6 | 7^{7}
(Argentina) G Durán (Argentina) M González | 4 | 6^{4}
(Argentina) F Delbonis (Argentina) D Schwartzman | 3 | 3
3 | (United Kingdom) J Murray (Brazil) B Soares | 6 | 6

Third round
8 | (Canada) V Pospisil (United States) J Sock | 4 | 6 | 7^{7} | 5 | 4
(France) J Benneteau (France) É Roger-Vasselin | 6 | 3 | 6^{3} | 7 | 6
16 | (Croatia) M Pavić (New Zealand) M Venus | 3 | 6^{3} | 6 | 6 | 14
3 | (United Kingdom) J Murray (Brazil) B Soares | 6 | 7^{7} | 4 | 4 | 16

Quarterfinals
(France) J Benneteau (France) É Roger-Vasselin | 6 | 6 | 6^{11} | 6^{1} | 10
3 | (United Kingdom) J Murray (Brazil) B Soares | 4 | 4 | 7^{13} | 7^{7} | 8

==== Section 4 ====
First round
5 | (Croatia) I Dodig (Brazil) M Melo | 6 | 6
(France) P-H Mathieu (France) B Paire | 2 | 3
(Mexico) S González (United States) S Lipsky | 6 | 6
(Lithuania) R Berankis (United States) D Kudla | 3 | 2
Q | (El Salvador) M Arévalo (Venezuela) R Maytín | 7^{7} | 6^{5} | 6
Q | (Russia) K Kravchuk (Ukraine) D Molchanov | 6^{3} | 7^{7} | 8
(Luxembourg) G Müller (Denmark) F Nielsen | 6^{7} | 3
11 | (South Africa) R Klaasen (United States) R Ram | 7^{9} | 6
14 | (Czech Republic) R Štěpánek (Serbia) N Zimonjić | 7^{7} | 6
(United States) S Johnson (United States) S Querrey | 6^{4} | 3
(Serbia) D Lajović (Serbia) V Troicki | 6 | 6
(Ukraine) A Dolgopolov (Ukraine) S Stakhovsky | 3 | 1
WC | (United Kingdom) D Evans (United Kingdom) L Glasspool | 4 | 2
(Tunisia) M Jaziri (Czech Republic) L Rosol | 6 | 6
(Spain) Í Cervantes (Italy) P Lorenzi | 6 | 3 | 4
2 | (United States) B Bryan (United States) M Bryan | 4 | 6 | 6

Second round
5 | (Croatia) I Dodig (Brazil) M Melo | 6 | 6
(Mexico) S González (United States) S Lipsky | 2 | 3
Q | (Russia) K Kravchuk (Ukraine) D Molchanov | 6^{4} | 2
11 | (South Africa) R Klaasen (United States) R Ram | 7^{7} | 6
14 | (Czech Republic) R Štěpánek (Serbia) N Zimonjić | 7^{7} | 6^{4} | 10
(Serbia) D Lajović (Serbia) V Troicki | 6^{5} | 7^{7} | 8
(Tunisia) M Jaziri (Czech Republic) L Rosol | 3 | 4
2 | (United States) B Bryan (United States) M Bryan | 6 | 6

Third round
5 | (Croatia) I Dodig (Brazil) M Melo | 6^{3} | 6^{5} | 3
11 | (South Africa) R Klaasen (United States) R Ram | 7^{7} | 7^{7} | 6
14 | (Czech Republic) R Štěpánek (Serbia) N Zimonjić | 5 | 7^{12} | 4 | 6 | 3
2 | (United States) B Bryan (United States) M Bryan | 7 | 6^{10} | 6 | 3 | 6

Quarterfinals
11 | (South Africa) R Klaasen (United States) R Ram | 7^{7} | 6 | 7^{7}
2 | (United States) B Bryan (United States) M Bryan | 6^{2} | 1 | 6^{4}
