= 2016 Wimbledon Championships – Mixed doubles =

Mixed doubles
- 2016 Wimbledon Championships

Final
- Champions: (Finland) Henri Kontinen (United Kingdom) Heather Watson
- Runners-up: (Colombia) Robert Farah (Germany) Anna-Lena Grönefeld
- Score: 7–6^{(7–5)}, 6–4

Details
- Draw: 48
- Seeds: 16

Events
Singles	men	women		boys	girls
Doubles	men	women	mixed	boys	girls
WC Singles	men	women	quad
WC Doubles	men	women	quad
Legends	men	women	seniors
- Wimbledon Championships

Henri Kontinen and Heather Watson defeated Robert Farah and Anna-Lena Grönefeld in the final, 7–6^{(7–5)}, 6–4 to win the mixed doubles tennis title at the 2016 Wimbledon Championships. Kontinen became the first Finn to win a major title, while Watson became the first British woman to win the title since Jo Durie in 1987.

Leander Paes and Martina Hingis were the defending champions, but lost in the third round to Kontinen and Watson.

== Seeds ==
All seeds receive a bye into the second round.

1. (Croatia) Ivan Dodig / (India) Sania Mirza (second round)
2. (Brazil) Bruno Soares / (Russia) Elena Vesnina (second round, withdrew)
3. (Romania) Horia Tecău / (United States) CoCo Vandeweghe (second round)
4. (Belarus) Max Mirnyi / (Chinese Taipei) Chan Hao-ching (second round)
5. (Serbia) Nenad Zimonjić / (Chinese Taipei) Chan Yung-jan (third round)
6. (Poland) Łukasz Kubot / (Czech Republic) Andrea Hlaváčková (third round)
7. (South Africa) Raven Klaasen / (United States) Raquel Atawo (second round)
8. (Netherlands) Jean-Julien Rojer / (Netherlands) Kiki Bertens (second round)

9. (Czech Republic) Radek Štěpánek / (Czech Republic) Lucie Šafářová (third round)
10. (Austria) Alexander Peya / (Slovenia) Andreja Klepač (quarterfinals)
11. (Poland) Marcin Matkowski / (Slovenia) Katarina Srebotnik (quarterfinals)
12. (Canada) Daniel Nestor / (Chinese Taipei) Chuang Chia-jung (second round)
13. (India) Rohan Bopanna / (Australia) Anastasia Rodionova (third round)
14. (Pakistan) Aisam-ul-Haq Qureshi / (Kazakhstan) Yaroslava Shvedova (semifinals)
15. (Colombia) Robert Farah / (Germany) Anna-Lena Grönefeld (final)
16. (India) Leander Paes / (Switzerland) Martina Hingis (third round)

Click on the seed number of a player to go to their draw section.

== Draw ==
Key

- Q = Qualifier
- WC = Wild card
- LL = Lucky loser
- Alt = Alternate
- ITF = ITF entry
- PR = Protected ranking
- SR = Special ranking
- SE = Special exempt
- JE = Junior exempt
- JR = Junior Accelerator Programme entrant
- CO = College Accelerator Programme entrant
- NG = Next Gen Accelerator Program entrant
- w/o = Walkover
- r = Retired
- d = Defaulted

=== Finals ===
Quarterfinals
14	(Pakistan) Aisam-ul-Haq Qureshi (Kazakhstan) Yaroslava Shvedova	6	3	7
11	(Poland) Marcin Matkowski (Slovenia) Katarina Srebotnik	3	6	5
15	(Colombia) Robert Farah (Germany) Anna-Lena Grönefeld	6^{2}	6	6
10	(Austria) Alexander Peya (Slovenia) Andreja Klepač	7^{7}	3	3
(Austria) Oliver Marach (Latvia) Jeļena Ostapenko	7	4	6
(Colombia) Juan Sebastián Cabal (Colombia) Mariana Duque Mariño	5	6	0
(United States) Scott Lipsky (Russia) Alla Kudryavtseva	3	2
(Finland) Henri Kontinen (United Kingdom) Heather Watson	6	6

Semifinals
14	(Pakistan) Aisam-ul-Haq Qureshi (Kazakhstan) Yaroslava Shvedova	4	6	5
15	(Colombia) Robert Farah (Germany) Anna-Lena Grönefeld	6	2	7
(Austria) Oliver Marach (Latvia) Jeļena Ostapenko	6^{1}	3
(Finland) Henri Kontinen (United Kingdom) Heather Watson	7^{7}	6

Final
15	(Colombia) Robert Farah (Germany) Anna-Lena Grönefeld	6^{5}	4
(Finland) Henri Kontinen (United Kingdom) Heather Watson	7^{7}	6

=== Top half ===
==== Section 1 ====
First round
WC	(United Kingdom) C Fleming (United Kingdom) J Rae	1	6	3
WC	(United Kingdom) N Skupski (United Kingdom) A Smith	6	1	6
(Austria) J Knowle (China) S Zhang	7^{7}	6
(Argentina) M González (Romania) R Olaru	6^{3}	4
WC	(United Kingdom) K Skupski (United Kingdom) T Moore	3	7^{9}	3
(Sweden) R Lindstedt (Spain) A Medina Garrigues	6	6^{7}	6
(Mexico) S González (Spain) A Parra Santonja	6	6
(New Zealand) M Venus (Argentina) M Irigoyen	4	4

Second round
1	(Croatia) I Dodig (India) S Mirza	6	3	5
WC	(United Kingdom) N Skupski (United Kingdom) A Smith	4	6	7
(Austria) J Knowle (China) S Zhang	3	6^{4}
14	(Pakistan) A-u-H Qureshi (Kazakhstan) Y Shvedova	6	7^{7}
11	(Poland) M Matkowski (Slovenia) K Srebotnik	w/o
(Sweden) R Lindstedt (Spain) A Medina Garrigues
(Mexico) S González (Spain) A Parra Santonja	6	6
7	(South Africa) R Klaasen (United States) R Atawo	4	4

Third round
WC	(United Kingdom) N Skupski (United Kingdom) A Smith	3	4
14	(Pakistan) A-u-H Qureshi (Kazakhstan) Y Shvedova	6	6
11	(Poland) M Matkowski (Slovenia) K Srebotnik	6	6
(Mexico) S González (Spain) A Parra Santonja	3	4

Quarterfinals
14	(Pakistan) A-u-H Qureshi (Kazakhstan) Y Shvedova	6	3	7
11	(Poland) M Matkowski (Slovenia) K Srebotnik	3	6	5

==== Section 2 ====
First round
(United States) N Monroe (Canada) G Dabrowski	6	6
WC	(United Kingdom) L Broady (United Kingdom) N Broady	4	2
(France) F Martin (Ukraine) O Savchuk	2	4
(Australia) C Guccione (Ukraine) E Svitolina	6	6
(Sweden) A Siljeström (China) Y Wang	4	4
WC	(United Kingdom) D Inglot (United Kingdom) L Robson	6	6
(Brazil) A Sá (Czech Republic) B Krejčíková	6	4	6
(Australia) J Peers (Australia) S Stosur	4	6	4

Second round
4	(Belarus) M Mirnyi (Chinese Taipei) H-c Chan	5	2
(United States) N Monroe (Canada) G Dabrowski	7	6
(Australia) C Guccione (Ukraine) E Svitolina	5	3
15	(Colombia) R Farah (Germany) A-L Grönefeld	7	6
10	(Austria) A Peya (Slovenia) A Klepač	6	7^{8}
WC	(United Kingdom) D Inglot (United Kingdom) L Robson	3	6^{6}
(Brazil) A Sá (Czech Republic) B Krejčíková	3	6	1
6	(Poland) Ł Kubot (Czech Republic) A Hlaváčková	6	3	6

Third round
(United States) N Monroe (Canada) G Dabrowski	5	6	4
15	(Colombia) R Farah (Germany) A-L Grönefeld	7	3	6
10	(Austria) A Peya (Slovenia) A Klepač	6	6
6	(Poland) Ł Kubot (Czech Republic) A Hlaváčková	1	2

Quarterfinals
15	(Colombia) R Farah (Germany) A-L Grönefeld	6^{2}	6	6
10	(Austria) A Peya (Slovenia) A Klepač	7^{7}	3	3

=== Bottom half ===
==== Section 3 ====
First round
(Germany) D Brown (United States) M Brengle	3	2
(Austria) O Marach (Latvia) J Ostapenko	6	6
(Russia) D Tursunov (Germany) A Petkovic	6	3	2
(Czech Republic) J Veselý (Czech Republic) K Siniaková	2	6	6
(Philippines) T Huey (Poland) A Rosolska	6	7^{7}
Alt	(Brazil) M Demoliner (United States) N Melichar	0	6^{1}
(Colombia) JS Cabal (Colombia) M Duque Mariño	6	6
(Croatia) M Pavić (Croatia) D Jurak	3	2

Second round
8	(Netherlands) J-J Rojer (Netherlands) K Bertens	6	6^{5}	4
(Austria) O Marach (Latvia) J Ostapenko	4	7^{7}	6
(Czech Republic) J Veselý (Czech Republic) K Siniaková	5	6^{5}
9	(Czech Republic) R Štěpánek (Czech Republic) L Šafářová	7	7^{7}
13	(India) R Bopanna (Australia) An Rodionova	6	7
(Philippines) T Huey (Poland) A Rosolska	3	5
(Colombia) JS Cabal (Colombia) M Duque Mariño	7	3	6
3	(Romania) H Tecău (United States) C Vandeweghe	5	6	3

Third round
(Austria) O Marach (Latvia) J Ostapenko	6	7^{7}
9	(Czech Republic) R Štěpánek (Czech Republic) L Šafářová	4	6^{5}
13	(India) R Bopanna (Australia) An Rodionova	6^{5}	3
(Colombia) JS Cabal (Colombia) M Duque Mariño	7^{7}	6

Quarterfinals
(Austria) O Marach (Latvia) J Ostapenko	7	4	6
(Colombia) JS Cabal (Colombia) M Duque Mariño	5	6	0

==== Section 4 ====
First round
(Spain) D Marrero (Spain) MJ Martínez Sánchez	5	7	3
(Netherlands) M Middelkoop (Georgia (country)) O Kalashnikova	7	5	6
(United States) S Lipsky (Russia) A Kudryavtseva	7	3	6
(Argentina) G Durán (China) C Liang	5	6	2
(Romania) F Mergea (Austria) T Paszek	3	2
(New Zealand) A Sitak (Germany) L Siegemund	6	6
(Finland) H Kontinen (United Kingdom) H Watson	w/o
(United States) D Kudla (United States) L Chirico

Second round
5	(Serbia) N Zimonjić (Chinese Taipei) Y-j Chan	7	6
(Netherlands) M Middelkoop (Georgia (country)) O Kalashnikova	5	1
(United States) S Lipsky (Russia) A Kudryavtseva	2	6	6
12	(Canada) D Nestor (Chinese Taipei) C-j Chuang	6	3	3
16	(India) L Paes (Switzerland) M Hingis	6	6
(New Zealand) A Sitak (Germany) L Siegemund	4	4
(Finland) H Kontinen (United Kingdom) H Watson	w/o
2	(Brazil) B Soares (Russia) E Vesnina

Third round
5	(Serbia) N Zimonjić (Chinese Taipei) Y-j Chan	3	6^{5}
(United States) S Lipsky (Russia) A Kudryavtseva	6	7^{7}
16	(India) L Paes (Switzerland) M Hingis	6	3	2
(Finland) H Kontinen (United Kingdom) H Watson	3	6	6

Quarterfinals
(United States) S Lipsky (Russia) A Kudryavtseva	3	2
(Finland) H Kontinen (United Kingdom) H Watson	6	6
