= 2016 Wimbledon Championships – Women's doubles =

Women's doubles
- 2016 Wimbledon Championships

Final
- Champions: (United States) Serena Williams (United States) Venus Williams
- Runners-up: (Hungary) Tímea Babos (Kazakhstan) Yaroslava Shvedova
- Score: 6–3, 6–4

Details
- Draw: 64 (4 Q / 4 WC )
- Seeds: 16

Events
Singles	men	women		boys	girls
Doubles	men	women	mixed	boys	girls
WC Singles	men	women	quad
WC Doubles	men	women	quad
Legends	men	women	seniors
← 2015 ·	Wimbledon Championships	· 2017 →

Serena and Venus Williams defeated Tímea Babos and Yaroslava Shvedova in the final, 6–3, 6–4 to win the ladies' doubles tennis title at the 2016 Wimbledon Championships. It was the Williams sisters' sixth Wimbledon doubles title, and their 14th and last major doubles title overall.

Martina Hingis and Sania Mirza were the defending champions, but lost in the quarterfinals to Babos and Shvedova.

== Seeds ==
1. (Switzerland) Martina Hingis / (India) Sania Mirza (quarterfinals)
2. (France) Caroline Garcia / (France) Kristina Mladenovic (quarterfinals)
3. (Chinese Taipei) Chan Hao-ching / (Chinese Taipei) Chan Yung-jan (second round)
4. (Russia) Ekaterina Makarova / (Russia) Elena Vesnina (quarterfinals)
5. (Hungary) Tímea Babos / (Kazakhstan) Yaroslava Shvedova (final)
6. (Czech Republic) Andrea Hlaváčková / (Czech Republic) Lucie Hradecká (third round)
7. (United States) Bethanie Mattek-Sands / (Czech Republic) Lucie Šafářová (first round)
8. (Germany) Julia Görges / (Czech Republic) Karolína Plíšková (semifinals)

9. (China) Xu Yifan / (China) Zheng Saisai (first round)
10. (United States) Raquel Atawo / (United States) Abigail Spears (semifinals)
11. (Slovenia) Andreja Klepač / (Slovenia) Katarina Srebotnik (first round)
12. (Russia) Margarita Gasparyan / (Romania) Monica Niculescu (first round)
13. (United States) Vania King / (Russia) Alla Kudryavtseva (second round)
14. (Spain) Anabel Medina Garrigues / (Spain) Arantxa Parra Santonja (third round, retired)
15. (Italy) Sara Errani / (Georgia (country)) Oksana Kalashnikova (first round)
16. (Netherlands) Kiki Bertens / (Sweden) Johanna Larsson (second round)

Click on the seed number of a player to go to their draw section.

== Draw ==
=== Key ===
- Q = Qualifier
- WC = Wild card
- LL = Lucky loser
- Alt = Alternate
- ITF = ITF entry
- PR = Protected ranking
- SR = Special ranking
- SE = Special exempt
- JE = Junior exempt
- JR = Junior Accelerator Programme entrant
- CO = College Accelerator Programme entrant
- NG = Next Gen Accelerator Program entrant
- w/o = Walkover
- r = Retired
- d = Defaulted

=== Finals ===
Quarterfinals
1	(Switzerland) Martina Hingis (India) Sania Mirza	2	4
5	(Hungary) Tímea Babos (Kazakhstan) Yaroslava Shvedova	6	6
PR	(Germany) Anna-Lena Grönefeld (Czech Republic) Květa Peschke	4	2
10	(United States) Raquel Atawo (United States) Abigail Spears	6	6
(United States) Serena Williams (United States) Venus Williams	7^{7}	4	6
4	(Russia) Ekaterina Makarova (Russia) Elena Vesnina	6^{1}	6	2
8	(Germany) Julia Görges (Czech Republic) Karolína Plíšková	7^{11}	6
2	(France) Caroline Garcia (France) Kristina Mladenovic	6^{9}	3

Semifinals
5	(Hungary) Tímea Babos (Kazakhstan) Yaroslava Shvedova	6	6
10	(United States) Raquel Atawo (United States) Abigail Spears	4	2
(United States) Serena Williams (United States) Venus Williams	7^{7}	6
8	(Germany) Julia Görges (Czech Republic) Karolína Plíšková	6^{3}	4

Final
5	(Hungary) Tímea Babos (Kazakhstan) Yaroslava Shvedova	3	4
(United States) Serena Williams (United States) Venus Williams	6	6

=== Top half ===
==== Section 1 ====
First round
1	(Switzerland) M Hingis (India) S Mirza	6	7
(Germany) A-L Friedsam (Germany) L Siegemund	2	5
(Germany) M Barthel (Chinese Taipei) C-j Chuang	3	3
(Japan) E Hozumi (Japan) M Kato	6	6
(Ukraine) L Kichenok (United States) V Lepchenko	6	3	1
(United States) C McHale (Latvia) J Ostapenko	3	6	6
(Japan) N Hibino (Poland) A Rosolska	6	1	3
13	(United States) V King (Russia) A Kudryavtseva	3	6	6
9	(China) Y Xu (China) S Zheng	6^{6}	6	5
(Croatia) D Jurak (Australia) An Rodionova	7^{8}	2	7
(Belgium) K Flipkens (Germany) A Petkovic	4	6	4
(United Kingdom) J Konta (United States) M Sanchez	6	3	6
Q	(Japan) S Aoyama (Japan) M Ninomiya	6	6
(Ukraine) N Kichenok (Ukraine) L Tsurenko	1	1
(United States) M Keys (United States) S Stephens	2	4
5	(Hungary) T Babos (Kazakhstan) Y Shvedova	6	6

Second round
1	(Switzerland) M Hingis (India) S Mirza	6	6
(Japan) E Hozumi (Japan) M Kato	3	1
(United States) C McHale (Latvia) J Ostapenko	6	6
13	(United States) V King (Russia) A Kudryavtseva	1	4
(Croatia) D Jurak (Australia) An Rodionova	4	1
(United Kingdom) J Konta (United States) M Sanchez	6	6
Q	(Japan) S Aoyama (Japan) M Ninomiya	1	3
5	(Hungary) T Babos (Kazakhstan) Y Shvedova	6	6

Third round
1	(Switzerland) M Hingis (India) S Mirza	6	6
(United States) C McHale (Latvia) J Ostapenko	1	0
(United Kingdom) J Konta (United States) M Sanchez	6	1	5
5	(Hungary) T Babos (Kazakhstan) Y Shvedova	4	6	7

Quarterfinals
1	(Switzerland) M Hingis (India) S Mirza	2	4
5	(Hungary) T Babos (Kazakhstan) Y Shvedova	6	6

==== Section 2 ====
First round
3	(Chinese Taipei) H-c Chan (Chinese Taipei) Y-j Chan	6	6
WC	(Australia) A Barty (United Kingdom) L Robson	4	2
(Spain) L Arruabarrena (Montenegro) D Kovinić	5	6^{5}
(Serbia) J Janković (Serbia) A Krunić	7	7^{7}
PR	(Germany) A-L Grönefeld (Czech Republic) K Peschke	5	6	6
(Russia) S Kuznetsova (Italy) R Vinci	7	2	1
(Romania) I-C Begu (Romania) R Olaru	3	4
16	(Netherlands) K Bertens (Sweden) J Larsson	6	6
10	(United States) R Atawo (United States) A Spears	6	6
Q	(Chinese Taipei) C-w Chan (China) X Han	1	4
(United States) M Brengle (Germany) T Maria	6	6
WC	(Slovakia) D Hantuchová (Croatia) D Vekić	1	3
(Slovenia) P Hercog (Croatia) M Lučić-Baroni	5	3
(Japan) M Doi (Ukraine) E Svitolina	7	6
(Australia) D Gavrilova (Russia) D Kasatkina	6	0	7
7	(United States) B Mattek-Sands (Czech Republic) L Šafářová	2	6	5

Second round
3	(Chinese Taipei) H-c Chan (Chinese Taipei) Y-j Chan	2	6	2
(Serbia) J Janković (Serbia) A Krunić	6	4	6
PR	(Germany) A-L Grönefeld (Czech Republic) K Peschke	6	6
16	(Netherlands) K Bertens (Sweden) J Larsson	4	1
10	(United States) R Atawo (United States) A Spears	6	6
(United States) M Brengle (Germany) T Maria	3	0
(Japan) M Doi (Ukraine) E Svitolina	6	3	1
(Australia) D Gavrilova (Russia) D Kasatkina	3	6	6

Third round
(Serbia) J Janković (Serbia) A Krunić	4	4
PR	(Germany) A-L Grönefeld (Czech Republic) K Peschke	6	6
10	(United States) R Atawo (United States) A Spears	6	6
(Australia) D Gavrilova (Russia) D Kasatkina	3	3

Quarterfinals
PR	(Germany) A-L Grönefeld (Czech Republic) K Peschke	4	2
10	(United States) R Atawo (United States) A Spears	6	6

=== Bottom half ===
==== Section 3 ====
First round
6	(Czech Republic) A Hlaváčková (Czech Republic) L Hradecká	7^{7}	3	9
(China) C Liang (China) Y Wang	6^{3}	6	7
(Ukraine) K Bondarenko (Ukraine) O Savchuk	6	4	3
(France) A Cornet (Switzerland) X Knoll	4	6	6
(United States) I Falconi (United States) N Gibbs	6^{3}	1
Q	(Belgium) E Mertens (Belgium) A-S Mestach	7^{7}	6
(United States) S Williams (United States) V Williams	7	6
11	(Slovenia) A Klepač (Slovenia) K Srebotnik	5	3
15	(Italy) S Errani (Georgia (country)) O Kalashnikova	6	5	2
(Netherlands) M Krajicek (Czech Republic) B Strýcová	4	7	6
WC	(United Kingdom) T Moore (Switzerland) C Perrin	0	5
(Colombia) M Duque Mariño (Puerto Rico) M Puig	6	7
(United States) L Chirico (United States) A Riske	7	6^{1}	5
(Germany) A Beck (Belgium) Y Wickmayer	5	7^{7}	7
WC	(United Kingdom) J Rae (United Kingdom) A Smith	5	6	4
4	(Russia) E Makarova (Russia) E Vesnina	7	4	6

Second round
6	(Czech Republic) A Hlaváčková (Czech Republic) L Hradecká	6	6^{2}	7
(France) A Cornet (Switzerland) X Knoll	3	7^{7}	5
Q	(Belgium) E Mertens (Belgium) A-S Mestach	4	4
(United States) S Williams (United States) V Williams	6	6
(Netherlands) M Krajicek (Czech Republic) B Strýcová	7^{8}	6
(Colombia) M Duque Mariño (Puerto Rico) M Puig	6^{6}	4
(Germany) A Beck (Belgium) Y Wickmayer	6	3	1
4	(Russia) E Makarova (Russia) E Vesnina	4	6	6

Third round
6	(Czech Republic) A Hlaváčková (Czech Republic) L Hradecká	4	3
(United States) S Williams (United States) V Williams	6	6
(Netherlands) M Krajicek (Czech Republic) B Strýcová	3	4
4	(Russia) E Makarova (Russia) E Vesnina	6	6

Quarterfinals
(United States) S Williams (United States) V Williams	7^{7}	4	6
4	(Russia) E Makarova (Russia) E Vesnina	6^{1}	6	2

==== Section 4 ====
First round
8	(Germany) J Görges (Czech Republic) Ka Plíšková	6	6
(Czech Republic) D Allertová (Slovakia) AK Schmiedlová	2	1
(Argentina) M Irigoyen (Poland) P Kania	3	6	4
(Kazakhstan) Y Putintseva (Slovakia) M Rybáriková	6	2	6
(United Kingdom) N Broady (United Kingdom) H Watson	7^{7}	6
(Turkey) Ç Büyükakçay (Poland) K Jans-Ignacik	6^{4}	4
(Russia) A Panova (United States) S Rogers	4	6	6
12	(Russia) M Gasparyan (Romania) M Niculescu	6	4	3
14	(Spain) A Medina Garrigues (Spain) A Parra Santonja	4	6	6
(Czech Republic) B Krejčíková (Czech Republic) K Siniaková	6	4	3
(Canada) G Dabrowski (Spain) MJ Martínez Sánchez	6	6
(Canada) E Bouchard (Germany) S Lisicki	4	2
(Chinese Taipei) S-w Hsieh (United States) N Melichar	4	3
PR	(China) S Peng (China) S Zhang	6	6
Q	(Netherlands) D Schuurs (Czech Republic) R Voráčová	2	2
2	(France) C Garcia (France) K Mladenovic	6	6

Second round
8	(Germany) J Görges (Czech Republic) Ka Plíšková	6	6
(Kazakhstan) Y Putintseva (Slovakia) M Rybáriková	1	4
(United Kingdom) N Broady (United Kingdom) H Watson	7^{9}	7^{12}
(Russia) A Panova (United States) S Rogers	6^{7}	6^{10}
14	(Spain) A Medina Garrigues (Spain) A Parra Santonja	4	7^{7}	6
(Canada) G Dabrowski (Spain) MJ Martínez Sánchez	6	6^{4}	3
PR	(China) S Peng (China) S Zhang	6	3	4
2	(France) C Garcia (France) K Mladenovic	0	6	6

Third round
8	(Germany) J Görges (Czech Republic) Ka Plíšková	7^{7}	6^{0}	6
(United Kingdom) N Broady (United Kingdom) H Watson	6^{5}	7^{7}	3
14	(Spain) A Medina Garrigues (Spain) A Parra Santonja	3^{r}
2	(France) C Garcia (France) K Mladenovic	5

Quarterfinals
8	(Germany) J Görges (Czech Republic) Ka Plíšková	7^{11}	6
2	(France) C Garcia (France) K Mladenovic	6^{9}	3
