= Taylor Johnson (tennis) =

American tennis player

- Country (sports): United States
- Born: August 7, 2000 (age 24); Phoenix, Arizona
- Height: 5 ft 10 in (178 cm)
- Plays: Left (two-handed backhand)
- Coach: Rosie Casals and Erik Kortland
- Prize money: $13,601

Singles
- Career record: 18–19
- Highest ranking: No. 1047 (February 12, 2018)
- Current ranking: No. 1213 (March 18, 2024)

Grand Slam singles results
- Australian Open Junior: 3R (2017)
- French Open Junior: 1R (2017)
- Wimbledon Junior: 2R (2016)
- US Open Junior: 3R (2016)

Doubles
- Career record: 9–10
- Highest ranking: No. 573 (December 31, 2018)

Grand Slam doubles results
- US Open: 1R (2017)
- Last updated on: March 22, 2024.

Taylor Johnson (born August 7, 2000) is an American tennis player.

Johnson started playing tennis at the age of five in her home town of Phoenix, Arizona; she moved to California at the age of 11 and continued to play tennis.

On August 13, 2017, Johnson and her partner Claire Liu won the 2017 USTA Girls’ 18s National Championship. This win led to Johnson being ranked 8th in the world. With this victory, the pair earned a wildcard into the main draw of the women's doubles tournament at the 2017 US Open.

Johnson graduated from Connections Academy, and committed to play tennis at the NCAA Division I level at UCLA. In her four years at UCLA, she was very successful. She was named to the athletic directors honor roll all four years, named ITA scholar athlete 2019-20 school year, and was on the Pac-12 spring honor roll sophomore through senior year. In her junior year the Bruins won the Pac-12 regular season championship. She graduated with an undergraduate in communications in the spring of 2022.

== ITF Circuit finals ==
=== Doubles: 1 (runner-up) ===
Legend
$60,000 tournaments
$25,000 tournaments
$15,000 tournaments

Result	W–L	Date	Tournament	Tier	Surface	Partner	Opponents	Score
Loss	0–1	Jul 2018	Championships of Honolulu, United States	60,000	Hard	(United States) Ashley Lahey	(Japan) Misaki Doi (United States) Jessica Pegula	6–7^{(4)}, 3–6
