= Usue Maitane Arconada =

Argentine-born American tennis player (born 1998)

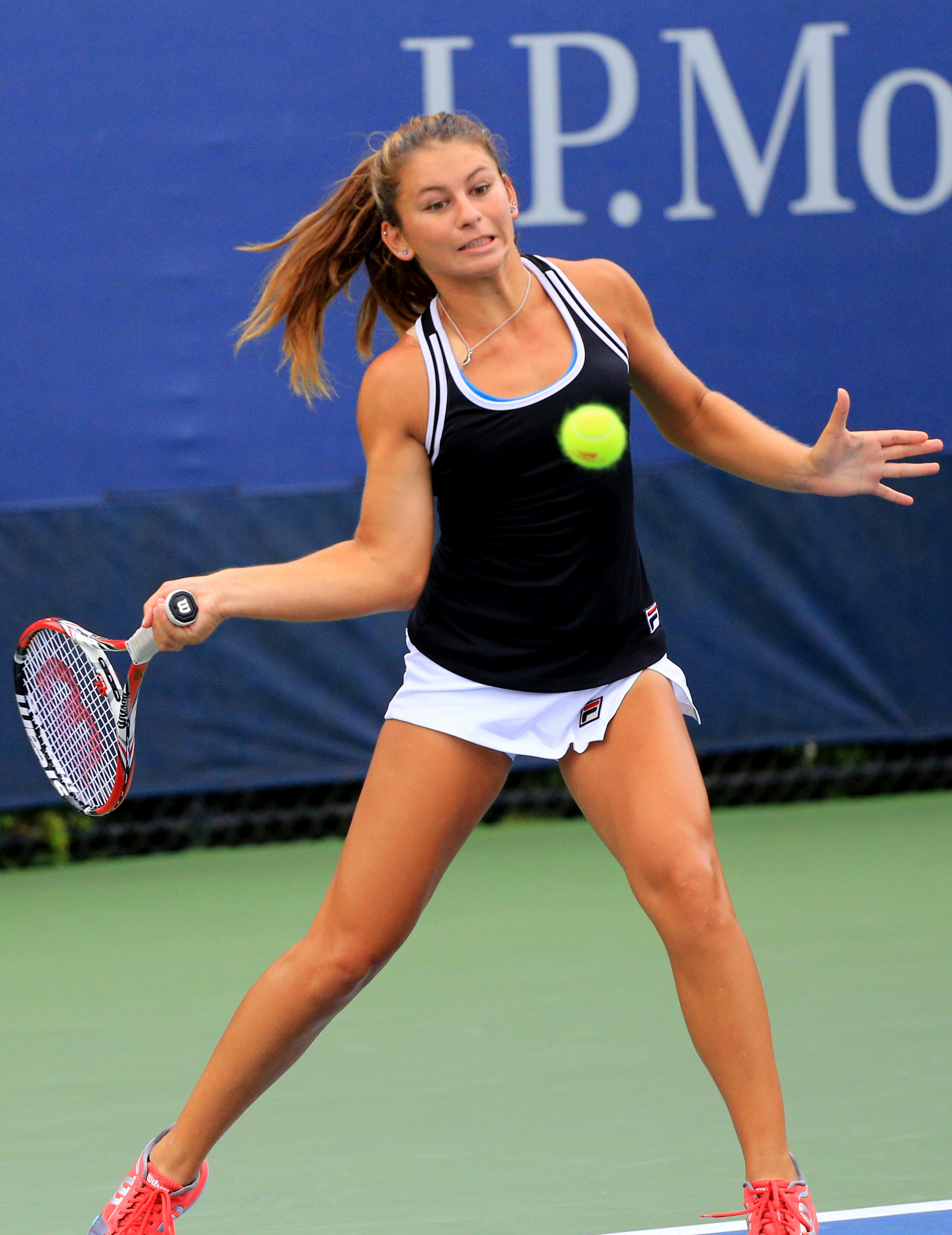
- Arconada at the 2015 US Open
- Country (sports): United States
- Residence: San Juan, Puerto Rico
- Born: October 28, 1998 (age 28) Buenos Aires, Argentina
- Height: 1.65 m (5 ft 5 in)
- Plays: Right (two-handed backhand)
- Coach: Stephen Huss
- Prize money: $582,167

Singles
- Career record: 226–192
- Career titles: 5 ITF
- Highest ranking: No. 130 (February 3, 2020)
- Current ranking: No. 720 (June 22, 2026)

Grand Slam singles results
- Australian Open: Q2 (2022)
- French Open: Q1 (2020, 2021)
- Wimbledon: Q1 (2021)
- US Open: 1R (2020)

Doubles
- Career record: 98–70
- Career titles: 8 ITF
- Highest ranking: No. 116 (December, 16 2019)
- Current ranking: No. 597 (June 22, 2026)

Grand Slam doubles results
- US Open: 1R (2019, 2020, 2021)
Medal record
Representing United States
Pan American Games
Gold medal – first place	2019 Lima	Women's doubles
- Last updated on: June 24, 2026.

Usue Maitane Arconada (born 28 October 1998) is an American tennis player born in Argentina. As a junior, she won the 2016 Wimbledon girls' doubles title. During her career, Arconada has won five singles and eight doubles titles on the ITF Women's Circuit.

== Career ==
=== Juniors ===
Arconada won the 2016 Wimbledon Championships girls' doubles title, alongside Claire Liu, defeating Mariam Bolkvadze and Caty McNally in the final. In May 2015, she achieved a career-high ITF juniors combined ranking of No.5.

=== Professional ===
Arconada made her WTA Tour debut at the 2016 Washington Open, defeating Françoise Abanda to reach the second round, where she lost to Yulia Putintseva in three sets.

She won the W60 event 2019 Tennis Championships of Honolulu, defeating Nicole Gibbs in the final.

Playing with Caroline Dolehide, Arconada won a gold medal in women's doubles at the 2019 Pan American Games in Lima, Peru, overcoming Verónica Cepede Royg and Montserrat González from Paraguay in the final.

Arconada reached her first WTA 125 final at the 2019 New Haven Challenger, losing to Anna Blinkova. Partnering Jamie Loeb, she also made the doubles final at the same event but lost to Blinkova and Oksana Kalashnikova in a deciding champions tiebreak.

She made her Grand Slam tournament singles main-draw debut at the 2020 US Open, losing in the first round to Kaja Juvan.

Alongside Cristina Bucșa, Arconada reached her second WTA 125 doubles final at the 2021 Concord Open, but lost to Peangtarn Plipuech and Jessy Rompies.

She won the W60 2021 Berkeley Tennis Club Challenge, defeating Marcela Zacarías in straight sets in the final.

At the 2024 Templeton Open, Arconada reached her first singles final for almost three years, losing in straight sets to the top seed, Renata Zarazúa.

== Performance timelines ==
Key
W	F	SF	QF	#R	RR	Q#	P#	DNQ	A	Z#	PO	G	S	B	NMS	NTI	P	NH

(W) winner; (F) finalist; (SF) semifinalist; (QF) quarterfinalist; (#R) rounds 4, 3, 2, 1; (RR) round-robin stage; (Q#) qualification round; (P#) preliminary round; (DNQ) did not qualify; (A) absent; (Z#) Davis/Fed Cup Zonal Group (with number indication) or (PO) play-off; (G) gold, (S) silver or (B) bronze Olympic/Paralympic medal; (NMS) not a Masters tournament; (NTI) not a Tier I tournament; (P) postponed; (NH) not held; (SR) strike rate (events won / competed); (W–L) win–loss record.
To avoid confusion and double counting, these charts are updated at the conclusion of a tournament or when the player's participation has ended.

=== Singles ===
Tournament	2017	2018	2019	2020	2021	2022	W–L
Grand Slam tournaments
Australian Open	A	A	A	Q1	Q1	Q2	0–0
French Open	A	A	A	Q1	Q1	A	0–0
Wimbledon	A	A	A	NH	Q1	A	0–0
US Open	Q1	A	Q1	1R	Q2	A	0–1
Win–loss	0–0	0–0	0–0	0–1	0–0	0–0	0–1
WTA 1000
Indian Wells Open	A	A	A	NH	1R	A	0–1
Miami Open	A	A	A	NH	Q1	A	0–0
Cincinnati Open	A	A	A	Q1	A	A	0–0
Career statistics
Year-end ranking	234	345	140	154	182	648	-

== WTA 125 finals ==
=== Singles: 1 (runner-up) ===
Result	W–L	Date	Tournament	Surface	Opponent	Score
Loss	0–1	Sep 2019	New Haven Challenger, United States	Hard	(Russia) Anna Blinkova	4–6, 2–6

=== Doubles: 2 (runner-ups) ===
Result	W–L	Date	Tournament	Surface	Partner	Opponents	Score
Loss	0–1	Sep 2019	New Haven Challenger, United States	Hard	(United States) Jamie Loeb	(Russia) Anna Blinkova (Georgia (country)) Oksana Kalashnikova	2–6, 6–4, [4–10]
Loss	0–2	Aug 2021	Concord Open, United States	Hard	(Spain) Cristina Bucșa	(Thailand) Peangtarn Plipuech (Indonesia) Jessy Rompies	6–3, 6–7^{(5)}, [8–10]

== ITF Circuit finals ==
Legend
W100 tournaments
W80 tournaments
W60/75 tournaments
W50 tournaments
W25 tournaments
W10 tournaments

=== Singles: 8 (5 titles, 3 runner-ups) ===
Result	W–L	Date	Tournament	Tier	Surface	Opponent	Score
Win	1–0	Jan 2015	ITF Saint Martin, Guadeloupe	10k	Hard	(Argentina) Victoria Bosio	7–5, 3–6, 6–1
Loss	1–1	Apr 2017	ITF Pelham, United States	25k	Clay	(Norway) Ulrikke Eikeri	5–7, 2–6
Loss	1–2	Apr 2019	Osprey Challenger, US	W25	Clay	(United States) Ann Li	3–6, 5–7
Win	2–2	Jun 2019	ITF Bethany Beach, US	W25	Clay	(United States) Natasha Subhash	6–1, 6–1
Win	3–2	Jun 2019	ITF Denver, United States	W25	Clay	(United States) Alexa Glatch	6–4, 2–6, 6–3
Win	4–2	Jul 2019	Championships of Honolulu, US	W60	Hard	(United States) Nicole Gibbs	6–0, 6–2
Win	5–2	Oct 2021	Berkeley Club Challenge, US	W60	Hard	(Mexico) Marcela Zacarías	6–1, 6–3
Loss	5–3	Sep 2024	Templeton Open, US	W75	Hard	(Mexico) Renata Zarazúa	4–6, 3–6

=== Doubles: 15 (8 titles, 7 runner–ups) ===
Result	W–L	Date	Tournament	Tier	Surface	Partner	Opponents	Score
Loss	0–1	Oct 2016	Abierto Tampico, Mexico	50k	Hard	(United Kingdom) Katie Swan	(Belgium) Elise Mertens (Romania) Mihaela Buzărnescu	0–6, 2–6
Loss	0–2	Dec 2016	ITF Santiago, Chile	25k	Clay	(Italy) Georgia Brescia	(Argentina) Guadalupe Perez Rojas (Slovenia) Tamara Zidanšek	3–6, 6–7^{(5)}
Loss	0–3	Feb 2017	ITF Surprise, US	25k	Hard	(United States) Sofia Kenin	(Colombia) Mariana Duque Mariño (Argentina) Nadia Podoroska	6–4, 0–6, [5–10]
Win	1–3	Jul 2017	Stockton Challenger, US	60k	Hard	(United States) Sofia Kenin	(Australia) Tammi Patterson (South Africa) Chanel Simmonds	4–6, 6–1, [10–5]
Win	2–3	Jan 2018	ITF Daytona Beach, US	25k	Clay	(Chile) Alexa Guarachi	(Norway) Ulrikke Eikeri (Belarus) Ilona Kremen	6–3, 6–4
Loss	2–4	Feb 2019	ITF Surprise, US	W25	Hard	(United States) Emina Bektas	(United States) Coco Gauff (New Zealand) Paige Hourigan	3–6, 6–4, [12–14]
Win	3–4	Apr 2019	ITF Pelham, US	W25	Clay	(United States) Caroline Dolehide	(Romania) Oana Georgeta Simion (Romania) Gabriela Talabă	6–3, 6–0
Win	4–4	Apr 2019	Dothan Pro Classic, US	W80	Clay	(United States) Caroline Dolehide	(Australia) Destanee Aiava (Australia) Astra Sharma	7–6^{(5)}, 6–4
Loss	4–5	May 2019	Bonita Springs Championship, US	W100	Clay	(United States) Caroline Dolehide	(Chile) Alexa Guarachi (New Zealand) Erin Routliffe	3–6, 6–7^{(5)}
Win	5–5	Jun 2019	ITF Bethany Beach, US	W25	Clay	(United States) Hayley Carter	(Bosnia and Herzegovina) Dea Herdželaš (Slovakia) Tereza Mihalíková	6–4, 6–4
Loss	5–6	Jul 2019	Championships of Honolulu, US	W60	Hard	(United States) Caroline Dolehide	(United States) Hayley Carter (United States) Jamie Loeb	4–6, 4–6
Win	6–6	Oct 2019	Tennis Classic of Macon, US	W80	Hard	(United States) Caroline Dolehide	(Australia) Jaimee Fourlis (Greece) Valentini Grammatikopoulou	7–6^{(5)}, 6–4
Win	7–6	Feb 2021	ITF Boca Raton, US	W25	Hard	(United States) Caroline Dolehide	(Colombia) Camila Osorio (Switzerland) Conny Perrin	6–3, 6–4
Win	8–6	Jul 2024	ITF Dallas, US	W50	Hard	(United States) Katrina Scott	(Mexico) Jéssica Hinojosa Gómez (Japan) Hiroko Kuwata	6–3, 6–3
Loss	8–7	Sep 2025	Templeton Open, US	W75	Hard	(Slovakia) Viktória Hrunčáková	Maria Kozyreva (Slovakia) Martina Okáľová	2–6, 5–7

== ITF Junior finals ==
=== Grand Slam tournaments ===
==== Girls' doubles: 1 (title) ====
Result	Year	Tournament	Surface	Partner	Opponents	Score
Win	2016	Wimbledon	Grass	(United States) Claire Liu	(Georgia (country)) Mariam Bolkvadze (United States) Caty McNally	6–2, 6–3
