= 2016 Wimbledon Championships – Women's doubles qualifying =

Women's doubles qualifying
- 2016 Wimbledon Championships

Events
Singles	men	women		boys	girls
Doubles	men	women	mixed	boys	girls
WC Singles	men	women	quad
WC Doubles	men	women	quad
Legends	men	women	seniors

Qualification
Singles	men	women
Doubles	men	women
- Wimbledon Championships

Players and pairs who neither have high enough rankings nor receive wild cards may participate in a qualifying tournament held one week before the annual Wimbledon Tennis Championships.

== Seeds ==
1. (China) Yang Zhaoxuan / (China) Zhang Kailin (qualifying competition)
2. (Belgium) Elise Mertens / (Belgium) An-Sophie Mestach (qualified)
3. (Russia) Vera Dushevina / (Russia) Marina Melnikova (first round)
4. (Japan) Shuko Aoyama / (Japan) Makoto Ninomiya (qualified)
5. (Chinese Taipei) Chan Chin-wei / (China) Han Xinyun (qualified)
6. (United States) Asia Muhammad / (United States) Taylor Townsend (qualifying competition)
7. (Netherlands) Demi Schuurs / (Czech Republic) Renata Voráčová (qualified)
8. (Australia) Jessica Moore / (Thailand) Varatchaya Wongteanchai (qualifying competition)

== Qualifiers ==
1. (Netherlands) Demi Schuurs / (Czech Republic) Renata Voráčová
2. (Belgium) Elise Mertens / (Belgium) An-Sophie Mestach
3. (Chinese Taipei) Chan Chin-wei / (China) Han Xinyun
4. (Japan) Shuko Aoyama / (Japan) Makoto Ninomiya

== Qualifying draw ==
=== First qualifier ===
First round
1	(China) Yang Zhaoxuan (China) Zhang Kailin	6	6
(Latvia) Anastasija Sevastova (Liechtenstein) Stephanie Vogt	2	4
(Paraguay) Verónica Cepede Royg (Brazil) Teliana Pereira	6	3	3
7	(Netherlands) Demi Schuurs (Czech Republic) Renata Voráčová	3	6	6

Qualifying competition
1	(China) Yang Zhaoxuan (China) Zhang Kailin	6	6^{1}	4
7	(Netherlands) Demi Schuurs (Czech Republic) Renata Voráčová	0	7^{7}	6

=== Second qualifier ===
First round
2	(Belgium) Elise Mertens (Belgium) An-Sophie Mestach	6	6
(Belarus) Aliaksandra Sasnovich (United States) Anna Tatishvili	3	4
(Switzerland) Viktorija Golubic (Germany) Carina Witthöft	4	6^{3}
8	(Australia) Jessica Moore (Thailand) Varatchaya Wongteanchai	6	7^{7}

Qualifying competition
2	(Belgium) Elise Mertens (Belgium) An-Sophie Mestach	6	6
8	(Australia) Jessica Moore (Thailand) Varatchaya Wongteanchai	0	4

=== Third qualifier ===
First round
3	(Russia) Vera Dushevina (Russia) Marina Melnikova	2	2
(Romania) Andreea Mitu (Romania) Patricia Maria Țig	6	6
(Ukraine) Kateryna Kozlova (Luxembourg) Mandy Minella	1	3
5	(Chinese Taipei) Chan Chin-wei (China) Han Xinyun	6	6

Qualifying competition
(Romania) Andreea Mitu (Romania) Patricia Maria Țig	2	2
5	(Chinese Taipei) Chan Chin-wei (China) Han Xinyun	6	6

=== Fourth qualifier ===
First round
4	(Japan) Shuko Aoyama (Japan) Makoto Ninomiya	6	7
WC	(United Kingdom) Harriet Dart (United Kingdom) Katy Dunne	4	5
Alt	(Austria) Tamira Paszek (Russia) Evgeniya Rodina	0	4
6	(United States) Asia Muhammad (United States) Taylor Townsend	6	6

Qualifying competition
4	(Japan) Shuko Aoyama (Japan) Makoto Ninomiya	7^{7}	6
6	(United States) Asia Muhammad (United States) Taylor Townsend	6^{2}	4
