= 2016 Wimbledon Championships – Men's doubles qualifying =

Men's doubles qualifying
- 2016 Wimbledon Championships

Events
| Singles | men | women | | boys | girls |
| Doubles | men | women | mixed | boys | girls |
| WC Singles | men | women | quad |
| WC Doubles | men | women | quad |
| Legends | men | women | seniors |

Qualification
| Singles | men | women |
| Doubles | men | women |
- Wimbledon Championships

Players and pairs who neither have high enough rankings nor receive wild cards may participate in a qualifying tournament held one week before the annual Wimbledon Tennis Championships.

== Seeds ==
1. (United States) James Cerretani / (Austria) Philipp Oswald (first round)
2. (Germany) Gero Kretschmer / (Germany) Alexander Satschko (first round)
3. (Australia) Rameez Junaid / (United States) Austin Krajicek (qualifying competition)
4. (India) Purav Raja / (India) Divij Sharan (first round)
5. (Netherlands) Sander Arends / (Austria) Tristan-Samuel Weissborn (first round)
6. (Thailand) Sanchai Ratiwatana / (Thailand) Sonchat Ratiwatana (qualifying competition, lucky losers)
7. (China) Bai Yan / (Croatia) Dino Marcan (first round)
8. (Germany) Frank Moser / (Croatia) Franko Škugor (first round)

== Qualifiers ==
1. (France) Quentin Halys / (France) Tristan Lamasine
2. (Russia) Konstantin Kravchuk / (Ukraine) Denys Molchanov
3. (El Salvador) Marcelo Arévalo / (Venezuela) Roberto Maytín
4. (Germany) Dustin Brown / (Germany) Jan-Lennard Struff

== Lucky losers ==
1. (Thailand) Sanchai Ratiwatana / (Thailand) Sonchat Ratiwatana

== Qualifying draw ==
=== First qualifier ===
First round
1 | (United States) James Cerretani (Austria) Philipp Oswald | 3 | 6 | 3
(France) Quentin Halys (France) Tristan Lamasine | 6 | 3 | 6
WC | (United Kingdom) Edward Corrie (United Kingdom) Joe Salisbury | 7^{9} | 4 | 14
8 | (Germany) Frank Moser (Croatia) Franko Škugor | 6^{7} | 6 | 12

Qualifying competition
(France) Quentin Halys (France) Tristan Lamasine | 2 | 6 | 6
WC | (United Kingdom) Edward Corrie (United Kingdom) Joe Salisbury | 6 | 2 | 3

=== Second qualifier ===
First round
2 | (Germany) Gero Kretschmer (Germany) Alexander Satschko | 6 | 6^{3} | 3
(Uruguay) Ariel Behar (Germany) Philipp Marx | 4 | 7^{7} | 6
(Russia) Konstantin Kravchuk (Ukraine) Denys Molchanov | 6 | 7^{7}
5 | (Netherlands) Sander Arends (Austria) Tristan-Samuel Weissborn | 4 | 6^{3}

Qualifying competition
(Uruguay) Ariel Behar (Germany) Philipp Marx | 4 | 4
(Russia) Konstantin Kravchuk (Ukraine) Denys Molchanov | 6 | 6

=== Third qualifier ===
First round
3 | (Australia) Rameez Junaid (United States) Austin Krajicek | 6^{3} | 7^{7} | 18
(Croatia) Antonio Šančić (Netherlands) Igor Sijsling | 7^{7} | 6^{5} | 16
(El Salvador) Marcelo Arévalo (Venezuela) Roberto Maytín | 7 | 6
7 | (China) Bai Yan (Croatia) Dino Marcan | 5 | 4

Qualifying competition
3 | (Australia) Rameez Junaid (United States) Austin Krajicek | 3 | 4
(El Salvador) Marcelo Arévalo (Venezuela) Roberto Maytín | 6 | 6

=== Fourth qualifier ===
First round
4 | (India) Purav Raja (India) Divij Sharan | 7^{7} | 4 | 6
(Germany) Dustin Brown (Germany) Jan-Lennard Struff | 6^{5} | 6 | 8
WC | (United Kingdom) Liam Broady (United Kingdom) Darren Walsh | 6 | 4 | 0
6 | (Thailand) Sanchai Ratiwatana (Thailand) Sonchat Ratiwatana | 3 | 6 | 6

Qualifying competition
(Germany) Dustin Brown (Germany) Jan-Lennard Struff | 6 | 3 | 15
6 | (Thailand) Sanchai Ratiwatana (Thailand) Sonchat Ratiwatana | 4 | 6 | 13
