= 2016 Wimbledon Championships – Day-by-day summaries =

Tennis tournament recaps

The 2016 Wimbledon Championships are described below in detail, in the form of day-by-day summaries.

== Day 1 (27 June) ==
- Seeds out:
  - Gentlemen's Singles: (France) Gaël Monfils [17], (South Africa) Kevin Anderson [20], (Germany) Philipp Kohlschreiber [21], (Uruguay) Pablo Cuevas [29]
  - Ladies' Singles: (Serbia) Ana Ivanovic [23], (Romania) Irina-Camelia Begu [25]
- Schedule of play

Matches on main courts
Matches on Centre Court
Event	Winner	Loser	Score
Gentlemen's Singles 1st Round	(Serbia) Novak Djokovic [1]	(United Kingdom) James Ward [WC]	6–0, 7–6^{(7–3)}, 6–4
Ladies' Singles 1st Round	(Spain) Garbiñe Muguruza [2]	(Italy) Camila Giorgi	6–2, 5–7, 6–4
Gentlemen's Singles 1st Round	(Switzerland) Roger Federer [3]	(Argentina) Guido Pella	7–6^{(7–5)}, 7–6^{(7–3)}, 6–3
Matches on No. 1 Court
Event	Winner	Loser	Score
Ladies' Singles 1st Round	(United States) Venus Williams [8]	(Croatia) Donna Vekić	7–6^{(7–3)}, 6–4
Gentlemen's Singles 1st Round	(Japan) Kei Nishikori [5]	(Australia) Sam Groth	6–4, 6–3, 7–5
Ladies' Singles 1st Round	(Germany) Angelique Kerber [4]	(United Kingdom) Laura Robson [WC]	6–2, 6–2
Matches on No. 2 Court
Event	Winner	Loser	Score
Gentlemen's Singles 1st Round	(France) Adrian Mannarino	(United Kingdom) Kyle Edmund	6–2, 7–5, 6–4
Ladies' Singles 1st Round	(United States) Madison Keys [9]	(Germany) Laura Siegemund	6–3, 6–1
Gentlemen's Singles 1st Round	(Canada) Milos Raonic [6]	(Spain) Pablo Carreño Busta	7–6^{(7–4)}, 6–2, 6–4
Ladies' Singles 1st Round	(Romania) Simona Halep [5]	(Slovakia) Anna Karolína Schmiedlová	6–4, 6–1
Ladies' Singles 1st Round	(Czech Republic) Karolína Plíšková [15]	(Belgium) Yanina Wickmayer	6–2, 0–6, 8–6
Matches on No. 3 Court
Event	Winner	Loser	Score
Ladies' Singles 1st Round	(Australia) Samantha Stosur [14]	(Poland) Magda Linette	7–5, 6–3
Gentlemen's Singles 1st Round	(Spain) David Ferrer [13]	(Israel) Dudi Sela	6–2, 6–1, 6–1
Gentlemen's Singles 1st Round	(Belgium) David Goffin [11]	(United Kingdom) Alexander Ward [WC]	6–2, 6–3, 6–2
Ladies' Singles 1st Round	(Ukraine) Elina Svitolina [17]	(United Kingdom) Naomi Broady	6–2, 6–3
Ladies' Singles 1st Round	(Netherlands) Kiki Bertens [26]	(Latvia) Jeļena Ostapenko	6–3, 6–2
Ladies' Singles 1st Round	(Serbia) Jelena Janković [22]	(Switzerland) Stefanie Vögele	6–2, 6–2

== Day 2 (28 June) ==
- Schedule of play

Matches on main courts
Matches on Centre Court
Event	Winner	Loser	Score
Ladies' Singles 1st Round	(United States) Serena Williams [1]	(Switzerland) Amra Sadiković [Q]	6–2, 6–4
Gentlemen's Singles 1st Round	(United Kingdom) Andy Murray [2]	(United Kingdom) Liam Broady [WC]	6–2, 6–3, 6–4
Ladies' Singles 1st Round	(Russia) Svetlana Kuznetsova [13]	(Denmark) Caroline Wozniacki	7–5, 6–4
Ladies' Singles 1st Round	(United States) Coco Vandeweghe [27]	(Ukraine) Kateryna Bondarenko	6–2, 7–6^{(7–3)}
Matches on No. 1 Court
Event	Winner	Loser	Score
Gentlemen's Singles 1st Round	(Switzerland) Stan Wawrinka [4]	(United States) Taylor Fritz	7–6^{(7–4)}, 6–1, 6–7^{(2–7)}, 6–4
Matches on No. 2 Court
Event	Winner	Loser	Score
Gentlemen's Singles 1st Round	(Australia) Nick Kyrgios [15]	(Czech Republic) Radek Štěpánek [WC]	6–4, 6–3, 6–7^{(9–11)}, 6–1
Matches on No. 3 Court
Event	Winner	Loser	Score
Gentlemen's Singles 1st Round	(France) Richard Gasquet [7]	(United Kingdom) Aljaž Bedene	6–3, 6–4, 6–3
Ladies' Singles 1st Round	(Italy) Roberta Vinci [6]	(United States) Alison Riske	6–2, 5–7, 6–3

== Day 3 (29 June) ==
- Schedule of play

Matches on main courts
Matches on Centre Court
Event	Winner	Loser	Score
Ladies' Singles 1st Round	(Poland) Agnieszka Radwańska [3]	(Ukraine) Kateryna Kozlova	6–2, 6–1
Gentlemen's Singles 2nd Round	(Serbia) Novak Djokovic [1]	(France) Adrian Mannarino	6–4, 6–3, 7–6^{(7–5)}
Gentlemen's Singles 2nd Round	(Switzerland) Roger Federer [3]	(United Kingdom) Marcus Willis [Q]	6–0, 6–3, 6–4
Ladies' Singles 1st Round	(Switzerland) Belinda Bencic [7]	(Bulgaria) Tsvetana Pironkova	6–2, 6–3
Ladies' Singles 1st Round	(Canada) Eugenie Bouchard	(Slovakia) Magdaléna Rybáriková	6–3, 6–4
Matches on No. 1 Court
Event	Winner	Loser	Score
Ladies' Singles 1st Round	(United Kingdom) Johanna Konta [16]	(Puerto Rico) Monica Puig	6–1, 7–5
Matches on No. 2 Court
Event	Winner	Loser	Score
Gentlemen's Singles 1st Round	(Australia) Bernard Tomic [19]	(Spain) Fernando Verdasco	4–6, 6–3, 6–3, 3–6, 6–4
Matches on No. 3 Court
Event	Winner	Loser	Score
Gentlemen's Singles 1st Round	(Austria) Dominic Thiem [8]	(Germany) Florian Mayer [PR]	7–5, 6–4, 6–4

== Day 4 (30 June) ==
- Seeds out:
  - Gentlemen's Singles: (Austria) Dominic Thiem [8], (Spain) David Ferrer [13], (France) Gilles Simon [16], (Croatia) Ivo Karlović [23], (Serbia) Viktor Troicki [25], (France) Benoît Paire [26], (Ukraine) Alexandr Dolgopolov [30]
  - Ladies' Singles: (Spain) Garbiñe Muguruza [2], (Switzerland) Belinda Bencic [7], (Australia) Samantha Stosur [14], (Czech Republic) Karolína Plíšková [15], (United Kingdom) Johanna Konta [16], (Ukraine) Elina Svitolina [17], (Italy) Sara Errani [20], (Serbia) Jelena Janković [22], (France) Caroline Garcia [30], (France) Kristina Mladenovic [31], (Germany) Andrea Petkovic [32]
  - Gentlemen's Doubles: (Netherlands) Jean-Julien Rojer / (Romania) Horia Tecău [4]
  - Ladies' Doubles: (China) Xu Yifan / (China) Zheng Saisai [9], (Slovenia) Andreja Klepač / (Slovenia) Katarina Srebotnik [11], (Russia) Margarita Gasparyan / (Romania) Monica Niculescu [12]
- Schedule of play

Matches on main courts
Matches on Centre Court
Event	Winner	Loser	Score
Gentlemen's Singles 2nd Round	(Japan) Kei Nishikori [5]	(France) Julien Benneteau [PR]	4–6, 6–4, 6–4, 6–2
Gentlemen's Singles 2nd Round	(United Kingdom) Andy Murray [2]	(Chinese Taipei) Lu Yen-hsun [PR]	6–3, 6–2, 6–1
Ladies' Singles 2nd Round	(Canada) Eugenie Bouchard	(United Kingdom) Johanna Konta [16]	6–3, 1–6, 6–1
Matches on No. 1 Court
Event	Winner	Loser	Score
Gentlemen's Singles 2nd Round	(Bulgaria) Grigor Dimitrov	(France) Gilles Simon [16]	6–3, 7–6^{(7–1)}, 4–6, 6–4
Ladies' Singles 2nd Round	(Slovakia) Jana Čepelová [Q]	(Spain) Garbiñe Muguruza [2]	6–3, 6–2
Gentlemen's Singles 2nd Round	(Czech Republic) Jiří Veselý	(Austria) Dominic Thiem [8]	7–6^{(7–4)}, 7–6^{(7–5)}, 7–6^{(7–3)}
Matches on No. 2 Court
Event	Winner	Loser	Score
Gentlemen's Singles 2nd Round	(United Kingdom) Daniel Evans	(Ukraine) Alexandr Dolgopolov [30]	7–6^{(8–6)}, 6–4, 6–1
Ladies' Singles 2nd Round	(Romania) Simona Halep [5]	(Italy) Francesca Schiavone	6–1, 6–1
Gentlemen's Singles 2nd Round	(Australia) Bernard Tomic [19]	(Moldova) Radu Albot [Q]	7–6^{(7–3)}, 6–3, 6–7^{(6–8)}, 6–3
Ladies' Singles 2nd Round	(Poland) Agnieszka Radwańska [3]	(Croatia) Ana Konjuh	6–2, 4–6, 9–7
Matches on No. 3 Court
Event	Winner	Loser	Score
Ladies' Singles 1st Round	(Switzerland) Timea Bacsinszky [11]	(Thailand) Luksika Kumkhum [Q]	6–4, 6–2
Gentlemen's Singles 2nd Round	(Canada) Milos Raonic [6]	(Italy) Andreas Seppi	7–6^{(7–5)}, 6–4, 6–2
Ladies' Singles 2nd Round	(United States) Julia Boserup [Q]	(Switzerland) Belinda Bencic [7]	6–4, 1–0, retired
Ladies' Doubles 1st Round	(United States) Serena Williams (United States) Venus Williams	(Slovenia) Andreja Klepač [11] (Slovenia) Katarina Srebotnik [11]	7–5, 6–3
Ladies' Singles 2nd Round	(United States) Coco Vandeweghe [27]	(Hungary) Tímea Babos	6–2, 6–3

== Day 5 (1 July) ==
- Seeds out:
  - Gentlemen's Singles: (Switzerland) Stan Wawrinka [4]
  - Ladies' Singles: (Russia) Daria Kasatkina [29]
- Schedule of play

Matches on main courts
Matches on Centre Court
Event	Winner	Loser	Score
Gentlemen's Singles 2nd Round	(Argentina) Juan Martín del Potro [PR]	(Switzerland) Stan Wawrinka [4]	3–6, 6–3, 7–6^{(7–2)}, 6–3
Ladies' Singles 2nd Round	(United States) Serena Williams [1]	(United States) Christina McHale	6–7^{(7–9)}, 6–2, 6–4
Gentlemen's Singles 3rd Round	(Switzerland) Roger Federer [3]	(United Kingdom) Daniel Evans	6–4, 6–2, 6–2
Matches on No. 1 Court
Event	Winner	Loser	Score
Ladies' Singles 3rd Round	(United States) Venus Williams [8]	(Russia) Daria Kasatkina [29]	7–5, 4–6, 10–8
Matches on No. 2 Court
Event	Winner	Loser	Score
Gentlemen's Singles 2nd Round	(Australia) Nick Kyrgios [15]	(Germany) Dustin Brown [WC]	6–7^{(3–7)}, 6–1, 2–6, 6–4, 6–4
Matches on No. 3 Court
Event	Winner	Loser	Score
Gentlemen's Singles 2nd Round	(Czech Republic) Tomáš Berdych [10]	(Germany) Benjamin Becker	6–4, 6–1, 6–2
Ladies' Singles 2nd Round	(Russia) Svetlana Kuznetsova [13]	(United Kingdom) Tara Moore [WC]	6–1, 2–6, 6–3

== Day 6 (2 July) ==
- Seeds out:
  - Gentlemen's Singles: (Serbia) Novak Djokovic [1], (Spain) Roberto Bautista Agut [14], (United States) Jack Sock [27]
  - Ladies' Singles: (Czech Republic) Petra Kvitová [10], (Netherlands) Kiki Bertens [26]
  - Gentlemen's Doubles: (Poland) Łukasz Kubot / (Austria) Alexander Peya [7], (Colombia) Juan Sebastián Cabal / (Colombia) Robert Farah [13]
  - Ladies' Doubles: (Italy) Sara Errani / (Georgia (country)) Oksana Kalashnikova [15]
- Schedule of play

Matches on main courts
Matches on Centre Court
Event	Winner	Loser	Score
Ladies' Singles 3rd Round	(Romania) Simona Halep [5]	(Netherlands) Kiki Bertens [26]	6−4, 6−3
Gentlemen's Singles 3rd Round	(United Kingdom) Andy Murray [2]	(Australia) John Millman	6–3, 7–5, 6–2
Gentlemen's Singles 3rd Round	(Canada) Milos Raonic [6]	(United States) Jack Sock [27]	7–6^{(7–2)}, 6–4, 7–6^{(7–1)}
Matches on No. 1 Court
Event	Winner	Loser	Score
Gentlemen's Singles 3rd Round	(United States) Sam Querrey [28]	(Serbia) Novak Djokovic [1]	7−6^{(8−6)}, 6−1, 3−6, 7−6^{(7−5)}
Ladies' Singles 3rd Round	(United States) Madison Keys [9]	(France) Alizé Cornet	6–4, 5–7, 6–2
Matches on No. 2 Court
Event	Winner	Loser	Score
Ladies' Singles 3rd Round	(Germany) Angelique Kerber [4]	(Germany) Carina Witthöft	7–6^{(13–11)}, 6–1
Ladies' Singles 2nd Round	(Russia) Ekaterina Makarova	(Czech Republic) Petra Kvitová [10]	7–5, 7–6^{(7–5)}
Ladies' Singles 3rd Round	(Slovakia) Dominika Cibulková [19]	(Canada) Eugenie Bouchard	6–4, 6–3
Matches on No. 3 Court
Event	Winner	Loser	Score
Gentlemen's Singles 3rd Round	(Japan) Kei Nishikori [5]	(Russia) Andrey Kuznetsov	7–5, 6–3, 7–5
Gentlemen's Singles 3rd Round	(Belgium) David Goffin [11]	(Uzbekistan) Denis Istomin	6–4, 6–3, 2–6, 6–1
Ladies' Singles 3rd Round	(Poland) Agnieszka Radwańska [3]	(Czech Republic) Kateřina Siniaková	6–3, 6–1

== Middle Sunday (3 July) ==
For only the fourth time in Wimbledon history, play was scheduled for the middle Sunday to avoid the tournament overrunning due to rain interruptions.

- Seeds out:
  - Gentlemen's Singles: (United States) John Isner [18], (Spain) Feliciano López [22], (Germany) Alexander Zverev [24], (Portugal) João Sousa [31]
  - Ladies' Singles: (Italy) Roberta Vinci [6], (Switzerland) Timea Bacsinszky [11], (United States) Sloane Stephens [19], (Czech Republic) Barbora Strýcová [24]
  - Ladies' Doubles: (Chinese Taipei) Chan Hao-ching / (Chinese Taipei) Chan Yung-jan [3], (United States) Bethanie Mattek-Sands / (Czech Republic) Lucie Šafářová [7], (United States) Vania King / (Russia) Alla Kudryavtseva [13], (Netherlands) Kiki Bertens / (Sweden) Johanna Larsson [16]
  - Mixed Doubles: (Romania) Horia Tecău / (United States) Coco Vandeweghe [3], (South Africa) Raven Klaasen / (United States) Raquel Atawo [7], (Canada) Daniel Nestor / (Chinese Taipei) Chuang Chia-jung [12]
- Schedule of play

Matches on main courts
Matches on Centre Court
Event	Winner	Loser	Score
Ladies' Singles 3rd Round	(United States) Coco Vandeweghe [27]	(Italy) Roberta Vinci [6]	6–3, 6–4
Ladies' Singles 3rd Round	(United States) Serena Williams [1]	(Germany) Annika Beck	6–3, 6–0
Gentlemen's Singles 3rd Round	(Czech Republic) Tomáš Berdych [10]	(Germany) Alexander Zverev [24]	6–3, 6–4, 4–6, 6–1
Matches on No. 1 Court
Event	Winner	Loser	Score
Ladies' Singles 3rd Round	(Russia) Svetlana Kuznetsova [13]	(United States) Sloane Stephens [19]	6–7^{(1–7)}, 6–2, 8–6
Gentlemen's Singles 3rd Round	(Australia) Nick Kyrgios [15]	(Spain) Feliciano López [22]	6–3, 6–7^{(2–7)}, 6–3, 6–4
Gentlemen's Singles 3rd Round	(Czech Republic) Jiří Veselý	(Portugal) João Sousa [31]	6–2, 6–2, 7–5
Matches on No. 2 Court
Event	Winner	Loser	Score
Ladies' Singles 3rd Round	(Russia) Anastasia Pavlyuchenkova [21]	(Switzerland) Timea Bacsinszky [11]	6–3, 6–2
Gentlemen's Singles 3rd Round	(France) Jo-Wilfried Tsonga [12]	(United States) John Isner [18]	6–7^{(3–7)}, 3–6, 7–6^{(7–5)}, 6–2, 19–17
Gentlemen's Doubles 2nd Round	(United States) Bob Bryan [2] (United States) Mike Bryan [2]	(Tunisia) Malek Jaziri (Czech Republic) Lukáš Rosol	6–3, 6–4
Mixed Doubles 1st Round	(United States) Nicholas Monroe (Canada) Gabriela Dabrowski	(United Kingdom) Liam Broady (United Kingdom) Naomi Broady	6–4, 6–2
Matches on No. 3 Court
Event	Winner	Loser	Score
Gentlemen's Doubles 2nd Round	(Austria) Oliver Marach (France) Fabrice Martin	(United Kingdom) Ken Skupski [WC] (United Kingdom) Neal Skupski [WC]	5–7, 6–2, 6–4
Ladies' Singles 3rd Round	(Russia) Ekaterina Makarova	(Czech Republic) Barbora Strýcová [24]	6–4, 6–2
Ladies' Doubles 2nd Round	(Switzerland) Martina Hingis [1] (India) Sania Mirza [1]	(Japan) Eri Hozumi (Japan) Miyu Kato	6–3, 6–1
Ladies' Doubles 1st Round	(Russia) Ekaterina Makarova [4] (Russia) Elena Vesnina [4]	(United Kingdom) Jocelyn Rae [WC] (United Kingdom) Anna Smith [WC]	7–5, 4–6, 6–4

== Day 7 (4 July) ==
- Seeds out:
  - Gentlemen's Singles: (Japan) Kei Nishikori [5], (France) Richard Gasquet [7], (Belgium) David Goffin [11], (Australia) Nick Kyrgios [15], (Australia) Bernard Tomic [19]
  - Ladies' Singles: (Poland) Agnieszka Radwańska [3], (United States) Madison Keys [9], (Spain) Carla Suárez Navarro [12], (Russia) Svetlana Kuznetsova [13], (United States) Coco Vandeweghe [27], (Czech Republic) Lucie Šafářová [28]
  - Gentlemen's Doubles: (Croatia) Ivan Dodig / (Brazil) Marcelo Melo [5], (India) Rohan Bopanna / (Romania) Florin Mergea [6], (United Kingdom) Dominic Inglot / (Canada) Daniel Nestor [9], (Uruguay) Pablo Cuevas / (Spain) Marcel Granollers [15]
  - Mixed Doubles: (Belarus) Max Mirnyi / (Chinese Taipei) Chan Hao-ching [4], (Netherlands) Jean-Julien Rojer / (Netherlands) Kiki Bertens [8]
- Schedule of play

Matches on main courts
Matches on Centre Court
Event	Winner	Loser	Score
Gentlemen's Singles 4th Round	(Switzerland) Roger Federer [3]	(United States) Steve Johnson	6–2, 6–3, 7–5
Ladies' Singles 4th Round	(United States) Serena Williams [1]	(Russia) Svetlana Kuznetsova [13]	7–5, 6–0
Gentlemen's Singles 4th Round	(United Kingdom) Andy Murray [2]	(Australia) Nick Kyrgios [15]	7–5, 6–1, 6–4
Matches on No. 1 Court
Event	Winner	Loser	Score
Ladies' Singles 4th Round	(Romania) Simona Halep [5]	(United States) Madison Keys [9]	6–7^{(5–7)}, 6–4, 6–3
Ladies' Singles 4th Round	(United States) Venus Williams [8]	(Spain) Carla Suárez Navarro [12]	7–6^{(7–3)}, 6–4
Gentlemen's Singles 4th Round	(France) Jo-Wilfried Tsonga [12]	(France) Richard Gasquet [7]	4–2, retired
Matches on No. 2 Court
Event	Winner	Loser	Score
Ladies' Singles 4th Round	(Germany) Angelique Kerber [4]	(Japan) Misaki Doi	6–3, 6–1
Gentlemen's Singles 4th Round	(Croatia) Marin Čilić [9]	(Japan) Kei Nishikori [5]	6–1, 5–1, retired
Gentlemen's Singles 4th Round	(Canada) Milos Raonic [6]	(Belgium) David Goffin [11]	4–6, 3–6, 6–4, 6–4, 6–4
Gentlemen's Doubles 2nd Round	(France) Julien Benneteau [PR] (France) Édouard Roger-Vasselin [PR]	(United Kingdom) Dominic Inglot [9] (Canada) Daniel Nestor [9]	7–6^{(7–0)}, 6–4
Matches on No. 3 Court
Event	Winner	Loser	Score
Ladies' Singles 4th Round	(Slovakia) Dominika Cibulková [19]	(Poland) Agnieszka Radwańska [3]	6–3, 5–7, 9–7
Ladies' Singles 4th Round	(Russia) Elena Vesnina	(Russia) Ekaterina Makarova	5–7, 6–1, 9–7

== Day 8 (5 July) ==
- Seeds out:
  - Ladies' Singles: (Romania) Simona Halep [5], (Slovakia) Dominika Cibulková [19], (Russia) Anastasia Pavlyuchenkova [21]
  - Gentlemen's Doubles: (Canada) Vasek Pospisil / (United States) Jack Sock [8], (Czech Republic) Radek Štěpánek / (Serbia) Nenad Zimonjić [14], (Croatia) Mate Pavić / (New Zealand) Michael Venus [16]
  - Ladies' Doubles: (Czech Republic) Andrea Hlaváčková / (Czech Republic) Lucie Hradecká [6]
  - Mixed Doubles: (Croatia) Ivan Dodig / (India) Sania Mirza [1], (India) Rohan Bopanna / (Australia) Anastasia Rodionova [13]
- Schedule of play

Matches on main courts
Matches on Centre Court
Event	Winner	Loser	Score
Ladies' Singles Quarterfinals	(Germany) Angelique Kerber [4]	(Romania) Simona Halep [5]	7–5, 7–6^{(7–2)}
Ladies' Singles Quarterfinals	(United States) Serena Williams [1]	(Russia) Anastasia Pavlyuchenkova [21]	6–4, 6–4
Gentlemen's Doubles 3rd Round	(United States) Bob Bryan [2] (United States) Mike Bryan [2]	(Czech Republic) Radek Štěpánek [14] (Serbia) Nenad Zimonjić [14]	7–5, 6–7^{(10–12)}, 6–4, 3–6, 6–3
Matches on No. 1 Court
Event	Winner	Loser	Score
Ladies' Singles Quarterfinals	(United States) Venus Williams [8]	(Kazakhstan) Yaroslava Shvedova	7–6^{(7–5)}, 6–2
Ladies' Singles Quarterfinals	(Russia) Elena Vesnina	(Slovakia) Dominika Cibulková [19]	6–2, 6–2
Gentlemen's Doubles 3rd Round	(France) Pierre-Hugues Herbert [1] (France) Nicolas Mahut [1]	(Australia) Sam Groth (Sweden) Robert Lindstedt	7–5, 3–6, 7–6^{(7–4)}, 6–3
Matches on No. 2 Court
Event	Winner	Loser	Score
Senior Gentlemen's Invitation Doubles Round Robin	(United Kingdom) Jeremy Bates (Sweden) Anders Järryd	(Iran) Mansour Bahrami (United States) Patrick McEnroe	6–3, 6–3
Gentlemen's Invitation Doubles Round Robin	(Sweden) Jonas Björkman (Sweden) Thomas Johansson	(Chile) Fernando González (Spain) Carlos Moyá	7–6^{(8–6)}, 2–6, [10–4]
Gentlemen's Doubles 3rd Round	(France) Julien Benneteau [PR] (France) Édouard Roger-Vasselin [PR]	(Canada) Vasek Pospisil [8] (United States) Jack Sock [8]	6–4, 3–6, 6–7^{(3–7)}, 7–5, 6–4
Mixed Doubles 3rd Round	(Colombia) Robert Farah [15] (Germany) Anna-Lena Grönefeld [15]	(United States) Nicholas Monroe (Canada) Gabriela Dabrowski	7–5, 3–6, 6–4
Matches on No. 3 Court
Event	Winner	Loser	Score
Ladies' Invitation Doubles Round Robin	(United States) Martina Navratilova (Tunisia) Selima Sfar	(Czech Republic) Jana Novotná (Czech Republic) Helena Suková	6–1, 6–2
Gentlemen's Singles 4th Round	(Czech Republic) Tomáš Berdych [10]	(Czech Republic) Jiří Veselý	4–6, 6–3, 7–6^{(10–8)}, 6–7^{(9–11)}, 6–3
Ladies' Doubles 3rd Round	(United States) Raquel Atawo [10] (United States) Abigail Spears [10]	(Australia) Daria Gavrilova (Russia) Daria Kasatkina	6–3, 6–3
Mixed Doubles 1st Round	(Czech Republic) Jiří Veselý (Czech Republic) Kateřina Siniaková	(Russia) Dmitry Tursunov (Germany) Andrea Petkovic	2–6, 6–3, 6–2
Ladies' Doubles 3rd Round	(United States) Serena Williams (United States) Venus Williams	(Czech Republic) Andrea Hlaváčková [6] (Czech Republic) Lucie Hradecká [6]	6–4, 6–3

== Day 9 (6 July) ==
- Seeds out:
  - Gentlemen's Singles: (Croatia) Marin Čilić [9], (France) Jo-Wilfried Tsonga [12], (United States) Sam Querrey [28], (France) Lucas Pouille [32]
  - Gentlemen's Doubles: (United States) Bob Bryan / (United States) Mike Bryan [2], (United Kingdom) Jamie Murray / (Brazil) Bruno Soares [3], (Finland) Henri Kontinen / (Australia) John Peers [10]
  - Ladies' Doubles: (Spain) Anabel Medina Garrigues / (Spain) Arantxa Parra Santonja [14]
  - Mixed Doubles: (Brazil) Bruno Soares / (Russia) Elena Vesnina [2], (Serbia) Nenad Zimonjić / (Chinese Taipei) Chan Yung-jan [5], (Poland) Łukasz Kubot / (Czech Republic) Andrea Hlaváčková [6]
- Schedule of play

Matches on main courts
Matches on Centre Court
Event	Winner	Loser	Score
Gentlemen's Singles Quarterfinals	(Switzerland) Roger Federer [3]	(Croatia) Marin Čilić [9]	6–7^{(4–7)}, 4–6, 6–3, 7–6^{(11–9)}, 6–3
Gentlemen's Singles Quarterfinals	(United Kingdom) Andy Murray [2]	(France) Jo-Wilfried Tsonga [12]	7–6^{(12–10)}, 6–1, 3–6, 4–6, 6–1
Matches on No. 1 Court
Event	Winner	Loser	Score
Gentlemen's Singles Quarterfinals	(Canada) Milos Raonic [6]	(United States) Sam Querrey [28]	6–4, 7–5, 5–7, 6–4
Gentlemen's Singles Quarterfinals	(Czech Republic) Tomáš Berdych [10]	(France) Lucas Pouille [32]	7–6^{(7–4)}, 6–3, 6–2
Matches on No. 2 Court
Event	Winner	Loser	Score
Ladies' Doubles 3rd Round	(Hungary) Tímea Babos [5] (Kazakhstan) Yaroslava Shvedova [5]	(United Kingdom) Johanna Konta (United States) Maria Sanchez	4–6, 6–1, 7–5
Gentlemen's Doubles Quarterfinals	(Philippines) Treat Huey [12] (Belarus) Max Mirnyi [12]	(United Kingdom) Jonathan Marray [WC] (Canada) Adil Shamasdin [WC]	6–4, 7–6^{(7–5)}, 6–3
Mixed Doubles 3rd Round	(Pakistan) Aisam-ul-Haq Qureshi [14] (Kazakhstan) Yaroslava Shvedova [14]	(United Kingdom) Neal Skupski [WC] (United Kingdom) Anna Smith [WC]	6–3, 6–4
Ladies' Doubles Quarterfinals	(United States) Raquel Atawo [10] (United States) Abigail Spears [10]	(Germany) Anna-Lena Grönefeld [PR] (Czech Republic) Květa Peschke [PR]	6–4, 6–2
Matches on No. 3 Court
Event	Winner	Loser	Score
Ladies' Invitation Doubles Round Robin	(United States) Martina Navratilova (Tunisia) Selima Sfar	(United Kingdom) Anne Keothavong (United Kingdom) Melanie South	6–1, 6–3
Ladies' Doubles 3rd Round	(Russia) Ekaterina Makarova [4] (Russia) Elena Vesnina [4]	(Netherlands) Michaëlla Krajicek (Czech Republic) Barbora Strýcová	6–3, 6–4
Gentlemen's Doubles Quarterfinals	(South Africa) Raven Klaasen [11] (United States) Rajeev Ram [11]	(United States) Bob Bryan [2] (United States) Mike Bryan [2]	7–6^{(7–2)}, 6–1, 7–6^{(7–4)}
Mixed Doubles 2nd Round	(Czech Republic) Radek Štěpánek [9] (Czech Republic) Lucie Šafářová [9]	(Czech Republic) Jiří Veselý (Czech Republic) Kateřina Siniaková	7–5, 7–6^{(7–5)}

== Day 10 (7 July) ==
- Seeds out:
  - Ladies' Singles: (United States) Venus Williams [8]
  - Gentlemen's Doubles: (South Africa) Raven Klaasen / (United States) Rajeev Ram [11], (Philippines) Treat Huey / (Belarus) Max Mirnyi [12]
  - Ladies' Doubles: (Switzerland) Martina Hingis / (India) Sania Mirza [1], (France) Caroline Garcia / (France) Kristina Mladenovic [2], (Russia) Ekaterina Makarova / (Russia) Elena Vesnina [4]
  - Mixed Doubles: (Czech Republic) Radek Štěpánek / (Czech Republic) Lucie Šafářová [9], (Austria) Alexander Peya / (Slovenia) Andreja Klepač [10], (Poland) Marcin Matkowski / (Slovenia) Katarina Srebotnik [11], (India) Leander Paes / (Switzerland) Martina Hingis [16]
- Schedule of play

Matches on main courts
Matches on Centre Court
Event	Winner	Loser	Score
Ladies' Singles Semifinals	(United States) Serena Williams [1]	(Russia) Elena Vesnina	6–2, 6–0
Ladies' Singles Semifinals	(Germany) Angelique Kerber [4]	(United States) Venus Williams [8]	6–4, 6–4
Gentlemen's Doubles Semifinals	(France) Pierre-Hugues Herbert [1] (France) Nicolas Mahut [1]	(Philippines) Treat Huey [12] (Belarus) Max Mirnyi [12]	6–4, 3–6, 6–7^{(3–7)}, 6–4, 6–4
Matches on No. 1 Court
Event	Winner	Loser	Score
Ladies' Doubles Quarterfinals	(Hungary) Tímea Babos [5] (Kazakhstan) Yaroslava Shvedova [5]	(Switzerland) Martina Hingis [1] (India) Sania Mirza [1]	6–2, 6–4
Gentlemen's Doubles Semifinals	(France) Julien Benneteau [PR] (France) Édouard Roger-Vasselin [PR]	(South Africa) Raven Klaasen [11] (United States) Rajeev Ram [11]	7–5, 6–4, 5–7, 7–6^{(7–5)}
Mixed Doubles 3rd Round	(Finland) Henri Kontinen (United Kingdom) Heather Watson	(India) Leander Paes [16] (Switzerland) Martina Hingis [16]	3–6, 6–3, 6–2
Matches on No. 2 Court
Event	Winner	Loser	Score
Senior Gentlemen's Invitation Doubles Round Robin	(Iran) Mansour Bahrami (United States) Patrick McEnroe	(United States) Rick Leach (France) Cédric Pioline	6–4, 6–3
Ladies' Doubles Quarterfinals	(Germany) Julia Görges [8] (Czech Republic) Karolína Plíšková [8]	(France) Caroline Garcia [2] (France) Kristina Mladenovic [2]	7–6^{(11–9)}, 6–3
Gentlemen's Invitation Doubles Round Robin	(South Africa) Wayne Ferreira (France) Sébastien Grosjean	(United States) Michael Chang (Australia) Mark Philippoussis	6–4, 7–5
Ladies' Doubles Quarterfinals	(United States) Serena Williams (United States) Venus Williams	(Russia) Ekaterina Makarova [4] (Russia) Elena Vesnina [4]	7–6^{(7–1)}, 4–6, 6–2
Matches on No. 3 Court
Event	Winner	Loser	Score
Ladies' Invitation Doubles Round Robin	(Croatia) Iva Majoli (Spain) Arantxa Sánchez Vicario	(Czech Republic) Jana Novotná (Czech Republic) Helena Suková	6–2, 6–4
Mixed Doubles 3rd Round	(Austria) Oliver Marach (Latvia) Jeļena Ostapenko	(Czech Republic) Radek Štěpánek [9] (Czech Republic) Lucie Šafářová [9]	6–4, 7–6^{(7–5)}
Mixed Doubles Quarterfinals	(Colombia) Robert Farah [15] (Germany) Anna-Lena Grönefeld [15]	(Austria) Alexander Peya [10] (Slovenia) Andreja Klepač [10]	6–7^{(2–7)}, 6–3, 6–3
Mixed Doubles Quarterfinals	(Pakistan) Aisam-ul-Haq Qureshi [14] (Kazakhstan) Yaroslava Shvedova [14]	(Poland) Marcin Matkowski [11] (Slovenia) Katarina Srebotnik [11]	6–3, 3–6, 7–5

== Day 11 (8 July) ==
- Seeds out:
  - Gentlemen's Singles: (Switzerland) Roger Federer [3], (Czech Republic) Tomáš Berdych [10]
  - Ladies' Doubles: (Germany) Julia Görges / (Czech Republic) Karolína Plíšková [8], (United States) Raquel Atawo / (United States) Abigail Spears [10]
  - Mixed Doubles: (Pakistan) Aisam-ul-Haq Qureshi / (Kazakhstan) Yaroslava Shvedova [14]
- Schedule of play

Matches on main courts
Matches on Centre Court
Event	Winner	Loser	Score
Gentlemen's Singles Semifinals	(Canada) Milos Raonic [6]	(Switzerland) Roger Federer [3]	6–3, 6–7^{(3–7)}, 4–6, 7–5, 6–3
Gentlemen's Singles Semifinals	(United Kingdom) Andy Murray [2]	(Czech Republic) Tomáš Berdych [10]	6–3, 6–3, 6–3
Matches on No. 1 Court
Event	Winner	Loser	Score
Ladies' Doubles Semifinals	(Hungary) Tímea Babos [5] (Kazakhstan) Yaroslava Shvedova [5]	(United States) Raquel Atawo [10] (United States) Abigail Spears [10]	6–4, 6–2
Ladies' Doubles Semifinals	(United States) Serena Williams (United States) Venus Williams	(Germany) Julia Görges [8] (Czech Republic) Karolína Plíšková [8]	7–6^{(7–3)}, 6–4
Mixed Doubles Quarterfinals	(Finland) Henri Kontinen (United Kingdom) Heather Watson	(United States) Scott Lipsky (Russia) Alla Kudryavtseva	6–3, 6–2
Ladies' Invitation Doubles Round Robin	(United States) Lindsay Davenport (United States) Mary Joe Fernández	(Bulgaria) Magdalena Maleeva (Australia) Rennae Stubbs	6–4, 7–5
Matches on No. 3 Court
Event	Winner	Loser	Score
Ladies' Invitation Doubles Round Robin	(Czech Republic) Jana Novotná (Czech Republic) Helena Suková	(United Kingdom) Anne Keothavong (United Kingdom) Melanie South	6–3, 6–3
Mixed Doubles Quarterfinals	(Austria) Oliver Marach (Latvia) Jeļena Ostapenko	(Colombia) Juan Sebastián Cabal (Colombia) Mariana Duque Mariño	7–5, 4–6, 6–0
Senior Gentlemen's Invitation Doubles Round Robin	(France) Henri Leconte (United States) Jeff Tarango	(Spain) Sergio Casal (Spain) Emilio Sánchez	6–2, 6–4
Ladies' Invitation Doubles Round Robin	(United States) Martina Navratilova (Tunisia) Selima Sfar	(Croatia) Iva Majoli (Spain) Arantxa Sánchez Vicario	6–4, 6–1
Mixed Doubles Semifinals	(Colombia) Robert Farah (Germany) Anna-Lena Grönefeld [15]	(Pakistan) Aisam-ul-Haq Qureshi (Kazakhstan) Yaroslava Shvedova [14]	6–4, 2–6, 7–5

== Day 12 (9 July) ==
Defending champion Serena Williams successfully defended her title and seventh Wimbledon crown, she is now tied with Steffi Graf 22 Women's Singles titles in the Open Era.

- Seeds out:
  - Ladies' Singles: (Germany) Angelique Kerber [4]
  - Ladies' Doubles: (Hungary) Tímea Babos / (Kazakhstan) Yaroslava Shvedova [5]
- Schedule of play

Matches on main courts
Matches on Centre Court
Event	Winner	Loser	Score
Ladies' Singles Final	(United States) Serena Williams [1]	(Germany) Angelique Kerber [4]	7–5, 6–3
Gentlemen's Doubles Final	(France) Pierre-Hugues Herbert [1] (France) Nicolas Mahut [1]	(France) Julien Benneteau [PR] (France) Édouard Roger-Vasselin [PR]	6–4, 7–6^{(7–1)}, 6–3
Ladies' Doubles Final	(United States) Serena Williams (United States) Venus Williams	(Hungary) Tímea Babos [5] (Kazakhstan) Yaroslava Shvedova [5]	6–3, 6–4
Matches on No. 1 Court
Event	Winner	Loser	Score
Mixed Doubles Semifinals	(Finland) Henri Kontinen (United Kingdom) Heather Watson	(Austria) Oliver Marach (Latvia) Jeļena Ostapenko	7–6^{(7–1)}, 6–3
Gentlemen's Invitation Doubles Round Robin	(United States) Justin Gimelstob (United Kingdom) Ross Hutchins	(South Africa) Wayne Ferreira (France) Sébastien Grosjean	6–3, 3–6, [10–8]
Matches on No. 3 Court
Event	Winner	Loser	Score
Ladies' Invitation Doubles Round Robin	(Bulgaria) Magdalena Maleeva (Australia) Rennae Stubbs	(Austria) Barbara Schett (France) Nathalie Tauziat	6–1, 6–3
Gentlemen's Invitation Doubles Round Robin	(United Kingdom) Jamie Delgado (Netherlands) Richard Krajicek	(Sweden) Jonas Björkman (Sweden) Thomas Johansson	6–3, 4–6, [10–6]

== Day 13 (10 July) ==
- Seeds out:
  - Gentlemen's Singles: (Canada) Milos Raonic [6]
  - Mixed Doubles: (Colombia) Robert Farah / (Germany) Anna-Lena Grönefeld [15]
- Schedule of play

Matches on main courts
Matches on Centre Court
Event	Winner	Loser	Score
Gentlemen's Singles Final	(United Kingdom) Andy Murray [2]	(Canada) Milos Raonic [6]	6–4, 7–6^{(7–3)}, 7–6^{(7–2)}
Mixed Doubles Final	(Finland) Henri Kontinen (United Kingdom) Heather Watson	(Colombia) Robert Farah [15] (Germany) Anna-Lena Grönefeld [15]	7–6^{(7–5)}, 6–4
Matches on No. 1 Court
Event	Winner	Loser	Score
Ladies' Invitation Doubles Final	(United States) Martina Navratilova (Tunisia) Selima Sfar	(United States) Lindsay Davenport (United States) Mary Joe Fernández	7–6^{(7–5)}, ret.
Matches on No. 3 Court
Event	Winner	Loser	Score
Gentlemen's Invitation Doubles Final	(United Kingdom) Greg Rusedski (France) Fabrice Santoro	(Sweden) Jonas Björkman (Sweden) Thomas Johansson	7–5, 6–1
