= 2022 Wimbledon Championships – Day-by-day summaries =

Summary of the 2022 Wimbledon Championship

The 2022 Wimbledon Championships's order of play for main draw matches on the center court and outside courts, starting from June 27 until July 10.

All dates are BST (UTC+1).

== Day 1 (27 June) ==
- Seeds out:
  - Gentlemen's Singles: (Poland) Hubert Hurkacz [7], (Spain) Pablo Carreño Busta [16]
  - Ladies' Singles: (United States) Danielle Collins [7], (Italy) Martina Trevisan [22], (Brazil) Beatriz Haddad Maia [23], (Estonia) Kaia Kanepi [31]
- Schedule of play

Matches on main courts
Matches on Centre Court
Event	Winner	Loser	Score
Gentlemen's Singles 1st Round	(Serbia) Novak Djokovic [1]	(South Korea) Kwon Soon-woo	6–3, 3–6, 6–3, 6–4
Ladies' Singles 1st Round	(United Kingdom) Emma Raducanu [10]	(Belgium) Alison Van Uytvanck	6–4, 6–4
Gentlemen's Singles 1st Round	(United Kingdom) Andy Murray	(Australia) James Duckworth	4–6, 6–3, 6–2, 6–4
Matches on No. 1 Court
Event	Winner	Loser	Score
Ladies' Singles 1st Round	(Tunisia) Ons Jabeur [3]	(Sweden) Mirjam Björklund [Q]	6–1, 6–3
Gentlemen's Singles 1st Round	(Spain) Carlos Alcaraz [5]	(Germany) Jan-Lennard Struff	4–6, 7–5, 4–6, 7–6^{(7–3)}, 6–4
Ladies' Singles 1st Round	(Germany) Angelique Kerber [15]	(France) Kristina Mladenovic	6–0, 7–5
Ladies' Singles 1st Round (Note: This match was originally scheduled to play on No. 3 Court but was moved to No. 1 Court after the conclusion of the Kerber-Mladenovic match due to rain interruptions.)	(Germany) Tamara Korpatsch vs (United Kingdom) Heather Watson		7–6^{(9–7)}, 5–7, suspended
Matches on No. 2 Court
Event	Winner	Loser	Score
Gentlemen's Singles 1st Round	(United Kingdom) Cameron Norrie [9]	(Spain) Pablo Andújar	6–0, 7–6^{(7–3)}, 6–3
Ladies' Singles 1st Round	(Estonia) Anett Kontaveit [2]	(United States) Bernarda Pera	7–5, 6–1
Gentlemen's Singles 1st Round	(Italy) Jannik Sinner [10]	(Switzerland) Stan Wawrinka [WC]	7–5, 4–6, 6–3, 6–2
Ladies' Singles 1st Round	(Greece) Maria Sakkari [5] vs (Australia) Zoe Hives [Q]		Postponed
Matches on No. 3 Court
Event	Winner	Loser	Score
Gentlemen's Singles 1st Round	(Spain) Alejandro Davidovich Fokina	(Poland) Hubert Hurkacz [7]	7–6^{(7–4)}, 6–4, 5–7, 2–6, 7–6^{(10–8)}
Ladies' Singles 1st Round	(Czech Republic) Marie Bouzková	(United States) Danielle Collins [7]	5–7, 6–4, 6–4
Gentlemen's Singles 1st Round	(United Kingdom) Ryan Peniston [WC] vs (Switzerland) Henri Laaksonen		Postponed
Matches began at 11 am (1:30 pm on Centre Court and 1:00 pm on No. 1 Court) BST

== Day 2 (28 June) ==
- Seeds out:
  - Gentlemen's Singles: (Canada) Félix Auger-Aliassime [6], (Bulgaria) Grigor Dimitrov [18], (Denmark) Holger Rune [24], (United Kingdom) Dan Evans [28]
  - Ladies' Singles: (Switzerland) Belinda Bencic [14], (Switzerland) Jil Teichmann [18], (Italy) Camila Giorgi [21], (Kazakhstan) Yulia Putintseva [27], (United States) Shelby Rogers [30]
- Schedule of play

Matches on main courts
Matches on Centre Court
Event	Winner	Loser	Score
Ladies' Singles 1st Round	(Poland) Iga Świątek [1]	(Croatia) Jana Fett [Q]	6–0, 6–3
Gentlemen's Singles 1st Round	(Spain) Rafael Nadal [2]	(Argentina) Francisco Cerúndolo	6–4, 6–3, 3–6, 6–4
Ladies' Singles 1st Round	(France) Harmony Tan	(United States) Serena Williams [WC]	7–5, 1–6, 7–6^{(10–7)}
Matches on No. 1 Court
Event	Winner	Loser	Score
Gentlemen's Singles 1st Round (Note: This match was originally scheduled to play on Court 18, but was moved to No. 1 Court after Matteo Berrettini tested positive for COVID-19 and was forced to withdraw from the tournament.)	(Australia) Alex De Minaur [19]	(Bolivia) Hugo Dellien	6–1, 6–3, 7–5
Ladies' Singles 1st Round	(United Kingdom) Heather Watson	(Germany) Tamara Korpatsch	6–7^{(7–9)}, 7–5, 6–2
Ladies' Singles 1st Round	(Romania) Simona Halep [16]	(Czech Republic) Karolína Muchová	6–3, 6–2
Gentlemen's Singles 1st Round	(Greece) Stefanos Tsitsipas [4]	(Switzerland) Alexander Ritschard [Q]	7–6^{(7–1)}, 6–3, 5–7, 6–4
Ladies' Singles 1st Round (Note: This match was originally scheduled to play on No. 3 Court, but was moved to No. 1 Court after the conclusion of the Ritschard-Tsitsipas match due to match overruns.)	(Czech Republic) Tereza Martincová vs (Czech Republic) Karolína Plíšková [6]		6–7^{(1–7)}, 5–5, suspended
Matches on No. 2 Court
Event	Winner	Loser	Score
Gentlemen's Singles 1st Round	(United States) Steve Johnson	(Bulgaria) Grigor Dimitrov [18]	4–6, 5–2, retired
Ladies' Singles 1st Round	(United States) Coco Gauff [11]	(Romania) Elena-Gabriela Ruse	2–6, 6–3, 7–5
Ladies' Singles 1st Round	(Czech Republic) Petra Kvitová [25]	(Italy) Jasmine Paolini	2–6, 6–4, 6–2
Gentlemen's Singles 1st Round	(Australia) Jason Kubler [Q]	(United Kingdom) Dan Evans [28]	6–1, 6–4, 6–3
Ladies' Singles 1st Round (Note: This match was originally scheduled to play on No. 3 Court, but was moved to No. 2 Court after the conclusion of the Kubler-Evans match due to match overruns.)	(Spain) Garbiñe Muguruza [9] vs (Belgium) Greet Minnen		4–6, suspended
Matches on No. 3 Court
Event	Winner	Loser	Score
Ladies' Singles 1st Round	(Greece) Maria Sakkari [5]	(Australia) Zoe Hives [Q]	6–1, 6–4
Gentlemen's Singles 1st Round	(Australia) Nick Kyrgios	(United Kingdom) Paul Jubb [WC]	3–6, 6–1, 7–5, 6–7^{(3–7)}, 7–5
Gentlemen's Singles 1st Round	(United States) Maxime Cressy	(Canada) Félix Auger-Aliassime [6]	6–7^{(5–7)}, 6–4, 7–6^{(11–9)}, 7–6^{(7–5)}
Matches began at 11 am (1:30 pm on Centre Court and 1:00 pm on No. 1 Court) BST

== Day 3 (29 June) ==
Rain disrupted play for an hour and started at 12:45 pm local time, the roofs at two main courts were already closed.

- Seeds out:
  - Gentlemen's Singles: (Norway) Casper Ruud [3], (United States) Reilly Opelka [15], (Argentina) Sebastián Báez [31]
  - Ladies' Singles: (Estonia) Anett Kontaveit [2], (Spain) Garbiñe Muguruza [9], (United Kingdom) Emma Raducanu [10], (Romania) Sorana Cîrstea [26], (Ukraine) Anhelina Kalinina [29]
  - Gentlemen's Doubles: (El Salvador) Marcelo Arévalo / (Netherlands) Jean-Julien Rojer [4]
  - Ladies' Doubles: (Czech Republic) Lucie Hradecká / (India) Sania Mirza [6], (Romania) Monica Niculescu / (Romania) Elena-Gabriela Ruse [14]
- Schedule of play

Matches on main courts
Matches on Centre Court
Event	Winner	Loser	Score
Gentlemen's Singles 2nd Round	(Serbia) Novak Djokovic [1]	(Australia) Thanasi Kokkinakis	6–1, 6–4, 6–2
Ladies' Singles 2nd Round	(France) Caroline Garcia	(United Kingdom) Emma Raducanu [10]	6–3, 6–3
Gentlemen's Singles 2nd Round	(United States) John Isner [20]	(United Kingdom) Andy Murray	6–4, 7–6^{(7–4)}, 6–7^{(3–7)}, 6–4
Matches on No. 1 Court
Event	Winner	Loser	Score
Ladies' Singles 2nd Round	(Germany) Jule Niemeier	(Estonia) Anett Kontaveit [2]	6–4, 6–0
Ladies' Singles 1st Round	(Czech Republic) Karolína Plíšková [6]	(Czech Republic) Tereza Martincová	7–6^{(7–1)}, 7–5
Gentlemen's Singles 2nd Round	(United Kingdom) Cameron Norrie [9]	(Spain) Jaume Munar	6–4, 3–6, 5–7, 6–0, 6–2
Ladies' Singles 2nd Round	(Greece) Maria Sakkari [5]	(Bulgaria) Viktoriya Tomova	6–4, 6–3
Matches on No. 2 Court
Event	Winner	Loser	Score
Gentlemen's Singles 2nd Round	(France) Ugo Humbert	(Norway) Casper Ruud [3]	3–6, 6–2, 7–5, 6–4
Ladies' Singles 1st Round	(Belgium) Greet Minnen	(Spain) Garbiñe Muguruza [9]	6–4, 6–0
Ladies' Singles 2nd Round	(Germany) Angelique Kerber [15]	(Poland) Magda Linette	6–3, 6–3
Gentlemen's Singles 2nd Round	(Spain) Carlos Alcaraz [5]	(Netherlands) Tallon Griekspoor	6–4, 7–6^{(7–0)}, 6–3
Matches on No. 3 Court
Event	Winner	Loser	Score
Gentlemen's Singles 2nd Round	(United States) Steve Johnson	(United Kingdom) Ryan Peniston [WC]	6–3, 6–2, 6–4
Ladies' Singles 2nd Round	(Latvia) Jeļena Ostapenko [12]	(Belgium) Yanina Wickmayer [Q]	6–2, 6–2
Gentlemen's Singles 2nd Round	(Italy) Jannik Sinner [10]	(Sweden) Mikael Ymer	6–4, 6–3, 5–7, 6–2
Matches began at 11 am (1:30 pm on Centre Court and 1:00 pm on No. 1 Court) BST

== Day 4 (30 June) ==
- Seeds out:
  - Gentlemen's Singles: (Argentina) Diego Schwartzman [12], (Canada) Denis Shapovalov [13], (Spain) Roberto Bautista Agut [17] (withdrew), (Serbia) Filip Krajinović [26]
  - Ladies' Singles: (Czech Republic) Karolína Plíšková [6], (Spain) Sara Sorribes Tormo [32]
  - Gentlemen's Doubles: (Germany) Tim Pütz / (New Zealand) Michael Venus [5]
  - Ladies' Doubles: (Chinese Taipei) Latisha Chan / (Australia) Samantha Stosur [12]
- Schedule of play

Matches on main courts
Matches on Centre Court
Event	Winner	Loser	Score
Ladies' Singles 2nd Round	(United Kingdom) Katie Boulter	(Czech Republic) Karolína Plíšková [6]	3–6, 7–6^{(7–4)}, 6–4
Gentlemen's Singles 2nd Round	(Spain) Rafael Nadal [2]	(Lithuania) Ričardas Berankis	6–4, 6–4, 4–6, 6–3
Ladies' Singles 2nd Round	(United States) Coco Gauff [11]	(Romania) Mihaela Buzărnescu	6–2, 6–3
Matches on No. 1 Court
Event	Winner	Loser	Score
Gentlemen's Singles 2nd Round	(Greece) Stefanos Tsitsipas [4]	(Australia) Jordan Thompson	6–2, 6–3, 7–5
Ladies' Singles 2nd Round	(Poland) Iga Świątek [1]	(Netherlands) Lesley Pattinama Kerkhove [LL]	6–4, 4–6, 6–3
Gentlemen's Singles 2nd Round	(Australia) Alex De Minaur [19]	(United Kingdom) Jack Draper	5–7, 7–6^{(7–0)}, 6–2, 6–3
Matches on No. 2 Court
Event	Winner	Loser	Score
Ladies' Singles 2nd Round	(Spain) Paula Badosa [4]	(Romania) Irina Bara	6–3, 6–2
Gentlemen's Singles 2nd Round	(Australia) Nick Kyrgios	(Serbia) Filip Krajinović [26]	6–2, 6–3, 6–1
Ladies' Singles 2nd Round	(United States) Jessica Pegula [8]	(United Kingdom) Harriet Dart	4–6, 6–3, 6–1
Ladies' Singles 2nd Round	(Romania) Simona Halep [16]	(Belgium) Kirsten Flipkens [PR]	7–5, 6–4
Matches on No. 3 Court
Event	Winner	Loser	Score
Ladies' Singles 2nd Round	(Czech Republic) Petra Kvitová [25]	(Romania) Ana Bogdan	6–1, 7–6^{(7–5)}
Gentlemen's Singles 2nd Round	(United Kingdom) Liam Broady [WC]	(Argentina) Diego Schwartzman [12]	6–2, 4–6, 0–6, 7–6^{(8–6)}, 6–1
Gentlemen's Singles 2nd Round	(Colombia) Daniel Elahi Galán	(Spain) Roberto Bautista Agut [17]	Walkover
Gentlemen's Singles 2nd Round (Note: This match was originally scheduled to play on Court 17, but was moved to No. 3 Court after Roberto Bautista Agut tested positive for COVID-19 and was forced to withdraw from the tournament.)	(United States) Maxime Cressy vs (United States) Jack Sock [Q]		4–6, 4–6, suspended
Matches began at 11 am (1:30 pm on Centre Court and 1:00 pm on No. 1 Court) BST

== Day 5 (1 July) ==
- Seeds out:
  - Gentlemen's Singles: (United States) John Isner [20], (Georgia (country)) Nikoloz Basilashvili [22], (Serbia) Miomir Kecmanović [25], (Germany) Oscar Otte [32]
  - Ladies' Singles: (Greece) Maria Sakkari [5], (Germany) Angelique Kerber [15], (United States) Alison Riske-Amritraj [28], (China) Zhang Shuai [33]
  - Mixed Doubles: (El Salvador) Marcelo Arévalo / (Mexico) Giuliana Olmos [5]
- Schedule of play

Matches on main courts
Matches on Centre Court
Event	Winner	Loser	Score
Ladies' Singles 3rd Round	(Tunisia) Ons Jabeur [3]	(France) Diane Parry	6–2, 6–3
Gentlemen's Singles 3rd Round	(Serbia) Novak Djokovic [1]	(Serbia) Miomir Kecmanović [25]	6–0, 6–3, 6–4
Gentlemen's Singles 3rd Round	(United Kingdom) Cameron Norrie [9]	(United States) Steve Johnson	6–4, 6–1, 6–0
Matches on No. 1 Court
Event	Winner	Loser	Score
Ladies' Singles 3rd Round	(United Kingdom) Heather Watson	(Slovenia) Kaja Juvan	7–6^{(8–6)}, 6–2
Ladies' Singles 3rd Round	(Belgium) Elise Mertens [24]	(Germany) Angelique Kerber [15]	6–4, 7–5
Gentlemen's Singles 3rd Round	(Spain) Carlos Alcaraz [5]	(Germany) Oscar Otte [32]	6–3, 6–1, 6–2
Mixed Doubles 1st Round	(United Kingdom) Jamie Murray [WC] (United States) Venus Williams [WC]	(New Zealand) Michael Venus (Poland) Alicja Rosolska	6–3, 6–7^{(3–7)}, 6–3
Matches on No. 2 Court
Event	Winner	Loser	Score
Gentlemen's Singles 3rd Round	(United States) Frances Tiafoe [23]	(Kazakhstan) Alexander Bublik	3–6, 7–6^{(7–1)}, 7–6^{(7–3)}, 6–4
Ladies' Singles 3rd Round	(Germany) Tatjana Maria	(Greece) Maria Sakkari [5]	6–3, 7–5
Gentlemen's Singles 3rd Round	(Italy) Jannik Sinner [10]	(United States) John Isner [20]	6–4, 7–6^{(7–4)}, 6–3
Matches on No. 3 Court
Event	Winner	Loser	Score
Ladies' Singles 3rd Round	(Latvia) Jeļena Ostapenko [12]	(Romania) Irina-Camelia Begu	3–6, 6–1, 6–1
Gentlemen's Singles 2nd Round	(United States) Jack Sock [Q]	(United States) Maxime Cressy	6–4, 6–4, 3–6, 7–6^{(7–1)}
Gentlemen's Singles 3rd Round	(United States) Tommy Paul [30]	(Czech Republic) Jiří Veselý	6–3, 6–2, 6–2
Ladies' Singles 3rd Round	(France) Caroline Garcia	(China) Zhang Shuai [33]	7–6^{(7–3)}, 7–6^{(7–5)}
Matches began at 11 am (1:30 pm on Centre Court and 1:00 pm on No. 1 Court) BST

== Day 6 (2 July) ==
- Seeds out:
  - Gentlemen's Singles: (Greece) Stefanos Tsitsipas [4], (Italy) Lorenzo Sonego [27], (United States) Jenson Brooksby [29]
  - Ladies' Singles: (Poland) Iga Świątek [1], (United States) Jessica Pegula [8], (United States) Coco Gauff [11], (Czech Republic) Barbora Krejčíková [13], (Czech Republic) Petra Kvitová [25]
  - Ladies' Doubles: (Georgia (country)) Natela Dzalamidze / (Serbia) Aleksandra Krunić [13], (Czech Republic) Marie Bouzková / (Slovakia) Tereza Mihalíková [16]
- Schedule of play

Matches on main courts
Matches on Centre Court
Event	Winner	Loser	Score
Ladies' Singles 3rd Round	(United States) Amanda Anisimova [20]	(United States) Coco Gauff [11]	6–7^{(4–7)}, 6–2, 6–1
Ladies' Singles 3rd Round	(Spain) Paula Badosa [4]	(Czech Republic) Petra Kvitová [25]	7–5, 7–6^{(7–4)}
Gentlemen's Singles 3rd Round	(Spain) Rafael Nadal [2]	(Italy) Lorenzo Sonego [27]	6–1, 6–2, 6–4
Matches on No. 1 Court
Event	Winner	Loser	Score
Gentlemen's Singles 3rd Round	(Australia) Alex De Minaur [19]	(United Kingdom) Liam Broady [WC]	6–3, 6–4, 7–5
Ladies' Singles 3rd Round	(France) Alizé Cornet	(Poland) Iga Świątek [1]	6–4, 6–2
Gentlemen's Singles 3rd Round	(Australia) Nick Kyrgios	(Greece) Stefanos Tsitsipas [4]	6–7^{(2–7)}, 6–4, 6–3, 7–6^{(9–7)}
Matches on No. 2 Court
Event	Winner	Loser	Score
Ladies' Singles 3rd Round	(France) Harmony Tan	(United Kingdom) Katie Boulter [WC]	6–1, 6–1
Gentlemen's Singles 3rd Round	(Netherlands) Botic van de Zandschulp [21]	(France) Richard Gasquet	7–5, 2–6, 7–6^{(9–7)}, 6–1
Ladies' Singles 3rd Round	(Romania) Simona Halep [16]	(Poland) Magdalena Fręch	6–4, 6–1
Men's Doubles 2nd Round	(United Kingdom) Jamie Murray [9] (Brazil) Bruno Soares [9]	(Serbia) Nikola Ćaćić (Italy) Andrea Vavassori	6–4, 7–6^{(7–4)}, 7–5
Matches on No. 3 Court
Event	Winner	Loser	Score
Gentlemen's Singles 3rd Round	(Chile) Cristian Garín	(United States) Jenson Brooksby [29]	6–2, 6–3, 1–6, 6–4
Gentlemen's Singles 3rd Round	(United States) Taylor Fritz [11]	(Slovakia) Alex Molčan	6–4, 6–1, 7–6^{(7–3)}
Ladies' Singles 3rd Round	(Croatia) Petra Martić	(United States) Jessica Pegula [8]	6–2, 7–6^{(7–5)}
Mixed Doubles 1st Round	(United States) Jack Sock (United States) Coco Gauff	(United Kingdom) Kyle Edmund [WC] (United Kingdom) Olivia Nicholls [WC]	6–4, 6–1
Matches began at 11 am (1:30 pm on Centre Court and 1:00 pm on No. 1 Court) BST

== Day 7 (3 July) ==
This day was previously called Middle Sunday, as for the first time in the tournament's history there would be regular Middle Sunday matches to prevent from weather delays in the past.

- Seeds out:
  - Gentlemen's Singles: (Spain) Carlos Alcaraz [5], (United States) Frances Tiafoe [23], (United States) Tommy Paul [30]
  - Ladies' Singles: (Latvia) Jeļena Ostapenko [12], (Belgium) Elise Mertens [24]
  - Gentlemen's Doubles: (United Kingdom) Lloyd Glasspool / (Finland) Harri Heliövaara [15], (Brazil) Rafael Matos / (Spain) David Vega Hernández [16]
  - Ladies' Doubles: (Canada) Gabriela Dabrowski / (Mexico) Giuliana Olmos [3]
  - Mixed Doubles: (France) Nicolas Mahut / (China) Zhang Shuai [3], (Slovakia) Filip Polášek / (Slovenia) Andreja Klepač [8]
- Schedule of play

Matches on main courts
Matches on Centre Court
Event	Winner	Loser	Score
Ladies' Singles 4th Round	(Germany) Jule Niemeier	(United Kingdom) Heather Watson	6–2, 6–4
Gentlemen's Singles 4th Round	(Italy) Jannik Sinner [10]	(Spain) Carlos Alcaraz [5]	6–1, 6–4, 6–7^{(8–10)}, 6–3
Gentlemen's Singles 4th Round	(Serbia) Novak Djokovic [1]	(Netherlands) Tim van Rijthoven [WC]	6–2, 4–6, 6–1, 6–2
Matches on No. 1 Court
Event	Winner	Loser	Score
Ladies' Singles 4th Round	(Germany) Tatjana Maria	(Latvia) Jeļena Ostapenko [12]	5–7, 7–5, 7–5
Gentlemen's Singles 4th Round	(United Kingdom) Cameron Norrie [9]	(United States) Tommy Paul [30]	6–4, 7–5, 6–4
Ladies' Singles 4th Round	(Tunisia) Ons Jabeur [3]	(Belgium) Elise Mertens [24]	7–6^{(11–9)}, 6–4
Matches on No. 2 Court
Event	Winner	Loser	Score
Ladies' Singles 4th Round	(Czech Republic) Marie Bouzková	(France) Caroline Garcia	7–5, 6–2
Gentlemen's Singles 4th Round	(Belgium) David Goffin	(United States) Frances Tiafoe [23]	7–6^{(7–3)}, 5–7, 5–7, 6–4, 7–5
Mixed Doubles 2nd Round	(United Kingdom) Jonny O'Mara [WC] (United Kingdom) Alicia Barnett [WC]	(United Kingdom) Jamie Murray [WC] (United States) Venus Williams [WC]	3–6, 6–4, 7–6^{(18–16)}
Matches on No. 3 Court
Event	Winner	Loser	Score
Ladies' Doubles 3rd Round	(Japan) Shuko Aoyama [8] (Chinese Taipei) Chan Hao-ching [8]	(United States) Alison Riske-Amritraj (United States) CoCo Vandeweghe	6–4, 4–6, 7–6^{(10–3)}
Mixed Doubles 2nd Round	(Australia) Matthew Ebden (Australia) Samantha Stosur	(Belgium) Joran Vliegen [Alt] (Norway) Ulrikke Eikeri [Alt]	4–6, 7–6^{(8–6)}, 6–4
Gentlemen's Doubles 3rd Round	(United States) Rajeev Ram [1] (United Kingdom) Joe Salisbury [1]	(Brazil) Rafael Matos [16] (Spain) David Vega Hernández [16]	4–6, 6–4, 6–3, 6–4
Mixed Doubles 2nd Round	(United Kingdom) Neal Skupski [2] (United States) Desirae Krawczyk [2]	(Netherlands) Matwé Middelkoop (Australia) Ellen Perez	7–5, 6–2
Matches began at 11 am (1:30 pm on Centre Court and 1:00 pm on No. 1 Court) BST

== Day 8 (4 July) ==
- Seeds out:
  - Gentlemen's Singles: (Australia) Alex de Minaur [19], (Netherlands) Botic van de Zandschulp [21]
  - Ladies' Singles: (Spain) Paula Badosa [4]
  - Gentlemen's Doubles: (Netherlands) Wesley Koolhof / (United Kingdom) Neal Skupski [3], (United Kingdom) Jamie Murray / (Brazil) Bruno Soares [9], (Mexico) Santiago González / (Argentina) Andrés Molteni [13]
  - Ladies' Doubles: (United States) Asia Muhammad / (Japan) Ena Shibahara [5], (China) Xu Yifan / (China) Yang Zhaoxuan [9], (Ukraine) Nadiia Kichenok / (Romania) Raluca Olaru [15]
  - Mixed Doubles: (Netherlands) Jean-Julien Rojer / (Japan) Ena Shibahara [1], (Australia) John Peers / (Canada) Gabriela Dabrowski [4]
- Schedule of play

Matches on main courts
Matches on Centre Court
Event	Winner	Loser	Score
Gentlemen's Singles 4th Round	(Australia) Nick Kyrgios	(United States) Brandon Nakashima	4–6, 6–4, 7–6^{(7–2)}, 3–6, 6–2
Ladies' Singles 4th Round	(Romania) Simona Halep [16]	(Spain) Paula Badosa [4]	6–1, 6–2
Gentlemen's Singles 4th Round	(Spain) Rafael Nadal [2]	(Netherlands) Botic van de Zandschulp [21]	6–4, 6–2, 7–6^{(8–6)}
Matches on No. 1 Court
Event	Winner	Loser	Score
Ladies' Singles 4th Round	(Kazakhstan) Elena Rybakina [17]	(Croatia) Petra Martić	7–5, 6–3
Gentlemen's Singles 4th Round	(United States) Taylor Fritz [11]	(Australia) Jason Kubler [Q]	6–3, 6–1, 6–4
Ladies' Singles 4th Round	(United States) Amanda Anisimova [20]	(France) Harmony Tan	6–2, 6–3
Matches on No. 2 Court
Event	Winner	Loser	Score
Gentlemen's Singles 4th Round	(Chile) Cristian Garín	(Australia) Alex De Minaur [19]	2–6, 5–7, 7–6^{(7–3)}, 6–4, 7–6^{(10–6)}
Ladies' Singles 4th Round	(Australia) Ajla Tomljanović	(France) Alizé Cornet	4–6, 6–4, 6–3
Mixed Doubles Quarterfinals	(United States) Jack Sock (United States) Coco Gauff	(France) Édouard Roger-Vasselin (France) Alizé Cornet [PR]	6–3, 6–4
Matches on No. 3 Court
Event	Winner	Loser	Score
Ladies' Doubles 3rd Round	(Ukraine) Lyudmyla Kichenok [4] (Latvia) Jeļena Ostapenko [4]	(United Kingdom) Harriet Dart [WC] (United Kingdom) Heather Watson [WC]	5–7, 6–4, 6–2
Gentlemen's Doubles 3rd Round	(Australia) John Peers (Slovakia) Filip Polášek [7]	(United Kingdom) Jamie Murray (Brazil) Bruno Soares [9]	7–6^{(7–5)}, 6–4, 4–6, 6–4
Mixed Doubles 2nd Round	(Colombia) Robert Farah (Latvia) Jeļena Ostapenko [7]	(Serbia) Nikola Ćaćić (Serbia) Aleksandra Krunić [Alt]	7–6^{(7–5)}, 6–4
Mixed Doubles Quarterfinals	(Croatia) Mate Pavić (India) Sania Mirza [6]	(Australia) John Peers (Canada) Gabriela Dabrowski [4]	6–4, 3–6, 7–5
Matches began at 11 am (1:30 pm on Centre Court and 1:00 pm on No. 1 Court) BST

== Day 9 (5 July) ==
- Seeds out:
  - Gentlemen's Singles: (Italy) Jannik Sinner [10]
  - Gentlemen's Doubles: (Germany) Kevin Krawietz / (Germany) Andreas Mies [11]
  - Ladies' Doubles: (Japan) Shuko Aoyama / (Chinese Taipei) Chan Hao-ching [8], (United States) Nicole Melichar-Martinez / (Australia) Ellen Perez [10]
  - Mixed Doubles: (Colombia) Robert Farah / (Latvia) Jeļena Ostapenko [7]
- Schedule of play

Matches on main courts
Matches on Centre Court
Event	Winner	Loser	Score
Gentlemen's Singles Quarterfinals	(Serbia) Novak Djokovic [1]	(Italy) Jannik Sinner [10]	5–7, 2–6, 6–3, 6–2, 6–2
Women's Singles Quarterfinals	(Tunisia) Ons Jabeur [3]	(Czech Republic) Marie Bouzková	3–6, 6–1, 6–1
Matches on No. 1 Court
Event	Winner	Loser	Score
Women's Singles Quarterfinals	(Germany) Tatjana Maria	(Germany) Jule Niemeier	4–6, 6–2, 7–5
Gentlemen's Singles Quarterfinals	(United Kingdom) Cameron Norrie [9]	(Belgium) David Goffin	3–6, 7–5, 2–6, 6–3, 7–5
Matches began at 11 am (1:30 pm on Centre Court and 1:00 pm on No. 1 Court) BST

== Day 10 (6 July) ==
- Seeds out:
  - Gentlemen's Singles: (United States) Taylor Fritz [11]
  - Ladies' Singles: (United States) Amanda Anisimova [20]
  - Gentlemen's Doubles: (Australia) John Peers / (Slovakia) Filip Polášek [7], (France) Nicolas Mahut / (France) Édouard Roger-Vasselin [12]
  - Ladies' Doubles: (Slovenia) Andreja Klepač / (Chile) Alexa Guarachi [7], (Australia) Erin Routliffe / (Poland) Alicja Rosolska [11]
  - Mixed Doubles: (India) Sania Mirza / (Croatia) Mate Pavić [6]
- Schedule of play

Matches on main courts
Matches on Centre Court
Event	Winner	Loser	Score
Ladies' Singles Quarterfinals	(Romania) Simona Halep [16]	(United States) Amanda Anisimova [20]	6–2, 6–4
Gentlemen's Singles Quarterfinals	(Spain) Rafael Nadal [2]	(United States) Taylor Fritz [11]	3–6, 7–5, 3–6, 7–5, 7–6^{(10–4)}
Matches on No. 1 Court
Event	Winner	Loser	Score
Ladies' Singles Quarterfinals	(Kazakhstan) Elena Rybakina [17]	(Australia) Ajla Tomljanović	4–6, 6–2, 6–3
Gentlemen's Singles Quarterfinals	(Australia) Nick Kyrgios	(Chile) Cristian Garín	6–4, 6–3, 7–6^{(7–5)}
Matches began at 11 am (1:30 pm on Centre Court and 1:00 pm on No. 1 Court) BST

== Day 11 (7 July) ==
- Seeds out:
  - Gentlemen's Singles: (Spain) Rafael Nadal [2]
  - Ladies' Singles: (Romania) Simona Halep [16]
  - Gentlemen's Doubles: (United States) Rajeev Ram / (United Kingdom) Joe Salisbury [1], (Colombia) Juan Sebastián Cabal / (Colombia) Robert Farah [6]
- Schedule of play

Matches on main courts
Matches on Centre Court
Event	Winner	Loser	Score
Ladies' Singles Semifinals	(Tunisia) Ons Jabeur [3]	(Germany) Tatjana Maria	6–2, 3–6, 6–1
Ladies' Singles Semifinals	(Kazakhstan) Elena Rybakina [17]	(Romania) Simona Halep [16]	6–3, 6–3
Mixed Doubles Final	(United Kingdom) Neal Skupski (United States) Desirae Krawczyk [2]	(Australia) Matthew Ebden (Australia) Samantha Stosur	6–4, 6–3
Matches on No. 1 Court
Event	Winner	Loser	Score
Gentlemen's Doubles Semifinals	(Australia) Matthew Ebden (Australia) Max Purcell [14]	(United States) Rajeev Ram (United Kingdom) Joe Salisbury [1]	3–6, 6–7^{(1–7)}, 7–6^{(11–9)}, 6–4, 6–2
Gentlemen's Doubles Semifinals	(Croatia) Nikola Mektić (Croatia) Mate Pavić [2]	(Colombia) Juan Sebastián Cabal (Colombia) Robert Farah [6]	6–7^{(2–7)}, 7–6^{(7–0)}, 4–6, 6–2, 7–6^{(10–4)}
Matches began at 11 am (1:30 pm on Centre Court and 1:00 pm on No. 1 Court) BST

== Day 12 (8 July) ==
- Seeds out:
  - Gentlemen's Singles: (United Kingdom) Cameron Norrie [9]
  - Ladies' Doubles: (Ukraine) Lyudmyla Kichenok / (Latvia) Jeļena Ostapenko [4]
- Schedule of play

Matches on main courts
Matches on Centre Court
Event	Winner	Loser	Score
Ladies' Doubles Semifinals (Note: Originally scheduled to play on No. 1 Court, but the intending plan at Centre Court was to have a match of Rafael Nadal versus Nick Kyrgios proposed before the other semifinal match between Djokovic and Norrie, in which Nadal already withdrew due to abdominal muscle tear sustained in the previous round. The Ladies' Doubles matches were moved to this court.)	(Czech Republic) Barbora Krejčíková [2] (Czech Republic) Kateřina Siniaková [2]	(Ukraine) Lyudmyla Kichenok [4] (Latvia) Jeļena Ostapenko [4]	6–2, 6–2
Gentlemen's Singles Semifinals	(Serbia) Novak Djokovic [1]	(United Kingdom) Cameron Norrie [9]	2–6, 6–3, 6–2, 6–4
Ladies' Doubles Semifinals	(Belgium) Elise Mertens [1] (China) Zhang Shuai [1]	(United States) Danielle Collins (United States) Desirae Krawczyk	6–2, 3–6, 6–3
Matches began at 11 am (1:30 pm on Centre Court and 1:00 pm on No. 1 Court) BST

== Day 13 (9 July) ==
- Seeds out:
  - Ladies' Singles: (Tunisia) Ons Jabeur [3]
  - Gentlemen's Doubles: (Croatia) Nikola Mektić / (Croatia) Mate Pavić [2]
- Schedule of play

Matches on main courts
Matches on Centre Court
Event	Winner	Loser	Score
Ladies' Singles Final	(Kazakhstan) Elena Rybakina [17]	(Tunisia) Ons Jabeur [3]	3–6, 6–2, 6–2
Gentlemen's Doubles Final	(Australia) Matthew Ebden [14] (Australia) Max Purcell [14]	(Croatia) Nikola Mektić [2] (Croatia) Mate Pavić [2]	7–6^{(7–5)}, 6–7^{(3–7)}, 4–6, 6–4, 7–6^{(10–2)}
Matches began at 11 am (2:00 pm on Centre Court and 1:00 pm on No. 1 Court) BST

== Day 14 (10 July) ==
- Seeds out:
  - Ladies' Doubles: (Belgium) Elise Mertens / (China) Zhang Shuai [1]
- Schedule of play

Matches on main courts
Matches on Centre Court
Event	Winner	Loser	Score
Gentlemen's Singles Final	(Serbia) Novak Djokovic [1]	(Australia) Nick Kyrgios	4–6, 6–3, 6–4, 7–6^{(7–3)}
Ladies' Doubles Final	(Czech Republic) Barbora Krejčíková [2] (Czech Republic) Kateřina Siniaková [2]	(Belgium) Elise Mertens [1] (China) Zhang Shuai [1]	6–2, 6–4
Matches began at 11 am (2:00 pm on Centre Court and 1:00 pm on No. 1 Court) BST
