= No. 3 Court (Wimbledon) =

Tennis stadium

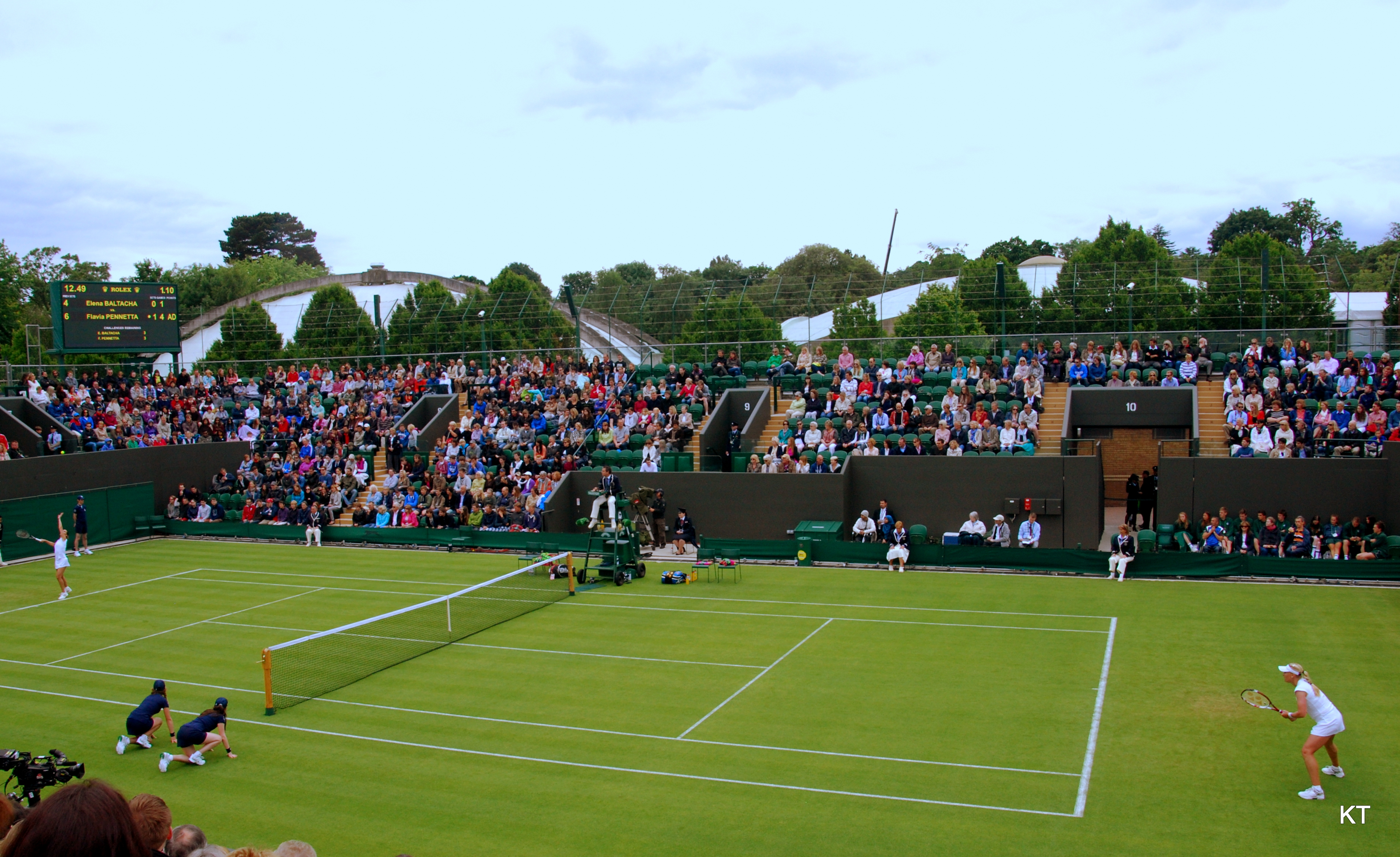
- Flavia Pennetta and Elena Baltacha playing on No. 3 Court during the 2013 Wimbledon Championships
- Interactive map of No. 3 Court
- Location: All England Lawn Tennis and Croquet Club; Wimbledon, London, SW19
- Coordinates: 51°25′58″N 0°12′53″W
- Owner: AELTC
- Capacity: 2,000
- Surface: grass
- Public transit: Southfields

Construction
- Opened: 20 June 2011

Tenant
- Wimbledon Championships

No. 3 Court is a tennis court at the All England Lawn Tennis and Croquet Club, Wimbledon, London. Unlike the other three Grand Slam events, Wimbledon does not name its main courts after famous players, choosing instead to use numbers, with the exception of Centre Court.

== History ==
=== Original No. 3 Court and renaming ===
The original No. 3 Court was renamed in 2009 to Court 4. Subsequently, this court and the surrounding area was demolished to make way for both the replacement Court 4 and space for stands of the new No. 3 Court.

=== New No. 3 Court ===
Following the building of the new No. 2 Court, the old No. 2 Court was rebuilt, becoming the new No. 3 Court. Work began at the end of the 2009 Championships and was finished in time for the 2011 Championships. The new No. 3 Court has a capacity of 2,000. It is the fourth largest court at Wimbledon after Centre Court, No. 1 Court, and No. 2 Court.

== See also ==
- List of tennis stadiums by capacity
