= 2016 Wimbledon Championships – Wheelchair women's singles =

Wheelchair women's singles
- 2016 Wimbledon Championships

Final
- Champions: (Netherlands) Jiske Griffioen
- Runners-up: (Netherlands) Aniek van Koot
- Score: 4–6, 6–0, 6–4

Events
Singles	men	women		boys	girls
Doubles	men	women	mixed	boys	girls
WC Singles	men	women	quad
WC Doubles	men	women	quad
Legends	men	women	seniors
Wimbledon Championships	· 2017 →

Jiske Griffioen defeated Aniek van Koot in the final, 4–6, 6–0, 6–4 to win the inaugural ladies' singles wheelchair tennis title at the 2016 Wimbledon Championships.

== Seeds ==
1. (Netherlands) Jiske Griffioen (champion)
2. (Japan) Yui Kamiji (quarterfinals)

== Draw ==
=== Key ===
- Q = Qualifier
- WC = Wild card
- LL = Lucky loser
- Alt = Alternate
- ITF = ITF entry
- PR = Protected ranking
- SR = Special ranking
- SE = Special exempt
- JE = Junior exempt
- JR = Junior Accelerator Programme entrant
- CO = College Accelerator Programme entrant
- NG = Next Gen Accelerator Program entrant
- w/o = Walkover
- r = Retired
- d = Defaulted

=== Finals ===
Quarterfinals
1	(Netherlands) Jiske Griffioen	6	6
(Germany) Sabine Ellerbrock	4	4
WC	(United Kingdom) Louise Hunt	0	2
(Netherlands) Marjolein Buis	6	6
(United Kingdom) Jordanne Whiley	6	6
(United Kingdom) Lucy Shuker	1	1
(Netherlands) Aniek van Koot	2	7	6
2	(Japan) Yui Kamiji	6	5	4

Semifinals
1	(Netherlands) Jiske Griffioen	6^{1}	6	7^{7}
(Netherlands) Marjolein Buis	7^{7}	0	6^{3}
(United Kingdom) Jordanne Whiley	5	3
(Netherlands) Aniek van Koot	7	6

Final
1	(Netherlands) Jiske Griffioen	4	6	6
(Netherlands) Aniek van Koot	6	0	4
