= 2016 Wimbledon Championships – Girls' doubles =

Girls' doubles
- 2016 Wimbledon Championships

Final
- Champions: (United States) Usue Maitane Arconada (United States) Claire Liu
- Runners-up: (Georgia (country)) Mariam Bolkvadze (United States) Caty McNally
- Score: 6–2, 6–3

Events
Singles	men	women		boys	girls
Doubles	men	women	mixed	boys	girls
WC Singles	men	women	quad
WC Doubles	men	women	quad
Legends	men	women	seniors
← 2015 ·	Wimbledon Championships	· 2017 →

Usue Maitane Arconada and Claire Liu won the title, defeating Mariam Bolkvadze and Caty McNally in the final, 6–2, 6–3.

Dalma Gálfi and Fanny Stollár were the defending champions, but chose not to participate.

== Seeds ==
1. (Russia) Olesya Pervushina / (Russia) Anastasia Potapova (semifinals)
2. (United States) Amanda Anisimova / (United States) Alexandra Sanford (quarterfinals)
3. (Slovenia) Kaja Juvan / (Poland) Iga Świątek (semifinals)
4. (United States) Usue Maitane Arconada / (United States) Claire Liu (champions)
5. (United States) Sofia Kenin / (Czech Republic) Monika Kilnarová (quarterfinals)
6. (United States) Kayla Day / (United States) Taylor Johnson (second round)
7. (Japan) Mai Hontama / (Japan) Chihiro Muramatsu (first round)
8. (United Kingdom) Jodie Burrage / (Hungary) Panna Udvardy (second round)

== Draw ==
=== Key ===
- Q = Qualifier
- WC = Wild card
- LL = Lucky loser
- Alt = Alternate
- SE = Special exempt
- PR = Protected ranking
- ITF = ITF entry
- JE = Junior exempt
- w/o = Walkover
- r = Retired
- d = Defaulted
- SR = Special ranking

=== Finals ===
Semifinals
1	(Russia) Olesya Pervushina (Russia) Anastasia Potapova	5	4
4	(United States) Usue Maitane Arconada (United States) Claire Liu	7	6
3	(Slovenia) Kaja Juvan (Poland) Iga Świątek	1	3
(Georgia (country)) Mariam Bolkvadze (United States) Caty McNally	6	6

Final
4	(United States) Usue Maitane Arconada (United States) Claire Liu	6	6
(Georgia (country)) Mariam Bolkvadze (United States) Caty McNally	2	3

=== Top half ===
First round
1	(Russia) Olesya Pervushina (Russia) Anastasia Potapova	6	6
(Spain) Paula Arias Manjón (Australia) Seone Mendez	2	1
(Canada) Charlotte Robillard-Millette (India) Karman Kaur Thandi	6^{6}	6	6
WC	(United Kingdom) Georgina Axon (United Kingdom) Lauryn John-Baptiste	7^{8}	4	4
(Italy) Federica Bilardo (Italy) Ludmilla Samsonova	3	2
(Greece) Eleni Christofi (Czech Republic) Lucie Kaňková	6	6
(China) Du Zhima (China) Zheng Wushuang	2	3
6	(United States) Kayla Day (United States) Taylor Johnson	6	6
4	(United States) Usue Maitane Arconada (United States) Claire Liu	6	2	6
(Japan) Yuki Naito (Belgium) Lara Salden	1	6	2
(Netherlands) Nina Kruijer (Ukraine) Anastasia Zarytska	4	2
(Moldova) Anastasia Dețiuc (Romania) Oana Gavrilă	6	6
(Sweden) Mirjam Björklund (Serbia) Olga Danilović	6	5	5
WC	(United Kingdom) Eliz Maloney (United Kingdom) Nell Miller	3	7	7
(United States) Maria Mateas (Peru) Dominique Schaefer	3	3
5	(United States) Sofia Kenin (Czech Republic) Monika Kilnarová	6	6

Second round
1	(Russia) O Pervushina (Russia) A Potapova	7^{7}	4	11
(Canada) C Robillard-Millette (India) KK Thandi	6^{4}	6	9
(Greece) E Christofi (Czech Republic) L Kaňková	6	7
6	(United States) K Day (United States) T Johnson	4	5
4	(United States) UM Arconada (United States) C Liu	6	6
(Moldova) A Dețiuc (Romania) O Gavrilă	0	1
WC	(United Kingdom) E Maloney (United Kingdom) N Miller	5	4
5	(United States) S Kenin (Czech Republic) M Kilnarová	7	6

Quarterfinals
1	(Russia) O Pervushina (Russia) A Potapova	6^{3}	6	6
(Greece) E Christofi (Czech Republic) L Kaňková	7^{7}	2	3
4	(United States) UM Arconada (United States) C Liu	6	6^{2}	6
5	(United States) S Kenin (Czech Republic) M Kilnarová	1	7^{7}	3

Semifinals
1	(Russia) O Pervushina (Russia) A Potapova	5	4
4	(United States) UM Arconada (United States) C Liu	7	6

=== Bottom half ===
First round
7	(Japan) Mai Hontama (Japan) Chihiro Muramatsu	4	3
(Norway) Malene Helgø (Romania) Ioana Mincă	6	6
(United Kingdom) Emily Appleton (United States) Morgan Coppoc	4	4
(Australia) Jaimee Fourlis (Australia) Baijing Lin	6	6
(Japan) Mayuka Aikawa (Switzerland) Ylena In-Albon	6	7
WC	(United Kingdom) Ema Lazic (United Kingdom) Eden Richardson	2	5
(Colombia) Emiliana Arango (Paraguay) Lara Escauriza	3	5
3	(Slovenia) Kaja Juvan (Poland) Iga Świątek	6	7
8	(United Kingdom) Jodie Burrage (Hungary) Panna Udvardy	6^{10}	6	6
(Argentina) María Lourdes Carlé (Argentina) Melany Krywoj	7^{12}	1	3
(China) Cao Siqi (United States) Chiara Lommer	6	3	2
(Georgia (country)) Mariam Bolkvadze (United States) Caty McNally	4	6	6
(Italy) Tatiana Pieri (Italy) Lucrezia Stefanini	6	2	2
WC	(United Kingdom) Ali Collins (United Kingdom) Francesca Jones	4	6	6
(Russia) Varvara Gracheva (Russia) Elena Rybakina	6	4	3
2	(United States) Amanda Anisimova (United States) Alexandra Sanford	3	6	6

Second round
(Norway) M Helgø (Romania) I Mincă	w/o
(Australia) J Fourlis (Australia) B Lin
(Japan) M Aikawa (Switzerland) Y In-Albon	6	4	1
3	(Slovenia) K Juvan (Poland) I Świątek	3	6	6
8	(United Kingdom) J Burrage (Hungary) P Udvardy	4	1
(Georgia (country)) M Bolkvadze (United States) C McNally	6	6
WC	(United Kingdom) A Collins (United Kingdom) F Jones	4	6	5
2	(United States) A Anisimova (United States) A Sanford	6	3	7

Quarterfinals
(Norway) M Helgø (Romania) I Mincă	6	4	3
3	(Slovenia) K Juvan (Poland) I Świątek	2	6	6
(Georgia (country)) M Bolkvadze (United States) C McNally	7	6^{5}	6
2	(United States) A Anisimova (United States) A Sanford	5	7^{7}	3

Semifinals
3	(Slovenia) K Juvan (Poland) I Świątek	1	3
(Georgia (country)) M Bolkvadze (United States) C McNally	6	6
