= No. 2 Court (Wimbledon) =

Tennis court at Wimbledon

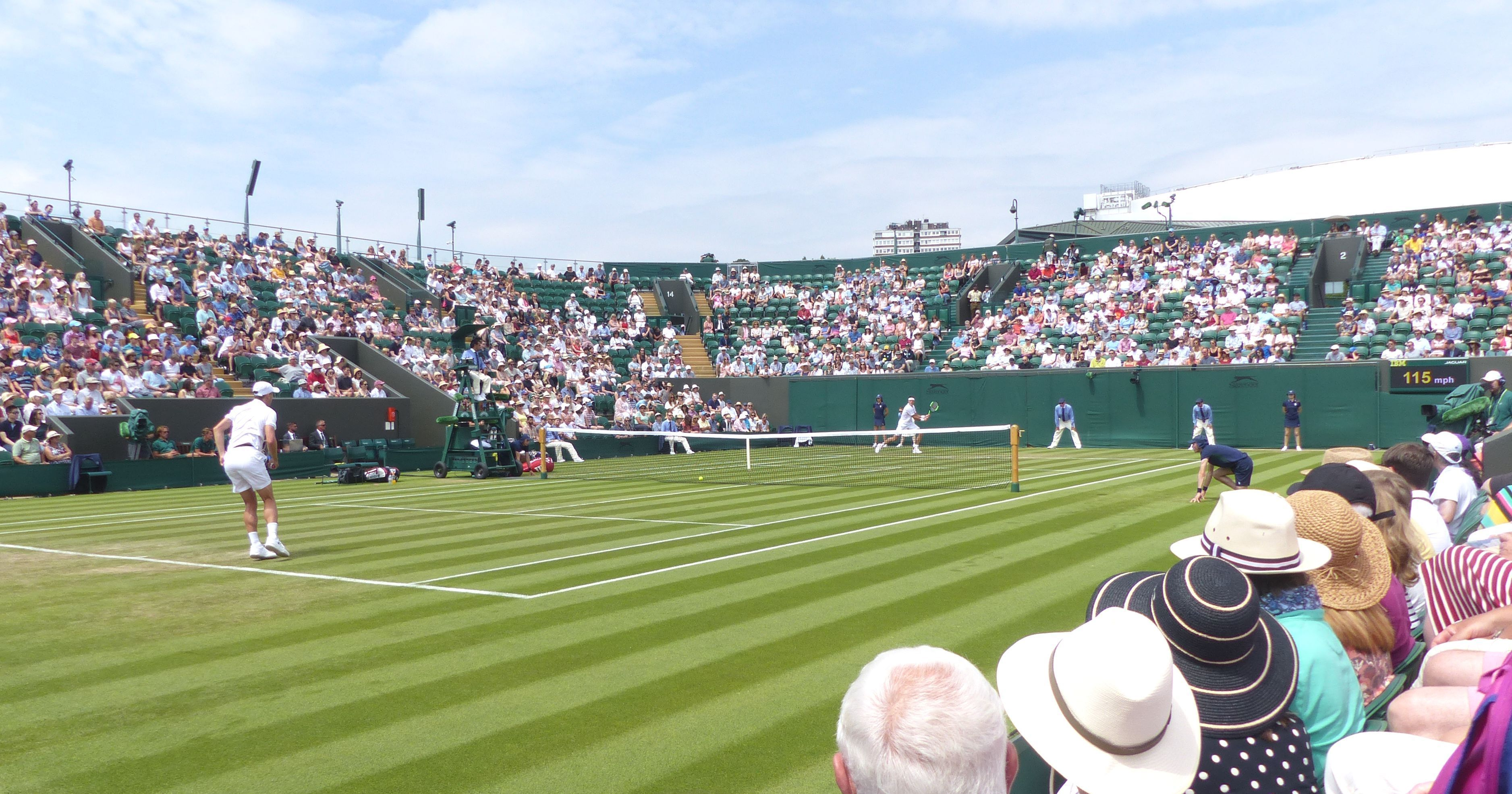
- No. 2 Court during the 2018 Wimbledon Championships
- Interactive map of No. 2 Court
- Location: All England Lawn Tennis and Croquet Club; Wimbledon, London, SW19
- Coordinates: 51°25′56″N 0°12′47″W
- Owner: AELTC
- Capacity: 4,000
- Surface: grass
- Public transit: Southfields

Construction
- Opened: 2009

Tenant
- Wimbledon Championships

No. 2 Court is a tennis court at the All England Lawn Tennis and Croquet Club, Wimbledon, London. Unlike the other three Grand Slam events, Wimbledon does not name its main courts after famous players, choosing instead to use numbers, with the exception of Centre Court.

== History ==
=== Old No. 2 Court ===
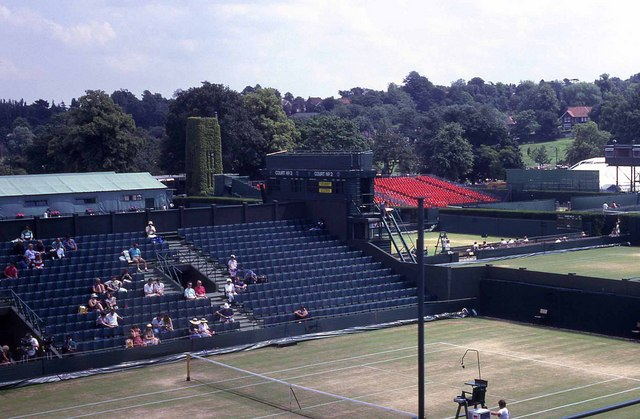
Old No. 2 Court during the 1991 Wimbledon Championships

The original No. 2 Court had a capacity of 2,192 seated and 770 standing and was informally referred to as the Graveyard of Champions until it was renumbered as the No. 3 Court from the 2009 Championships. The Court itself was then demolished to make way for a new No. 3 court and new Court 4 ready for the 2011 Championships.

The Graveyard of Champions tag was coined as many former champions fell to ignominious defeats on the No. 2 Court, including:

- Evonne Goolagong (1974 to Kerry Melville)
- John McEnroe (1979 to Tim Gullikson)
- Jimmy Connors (1983 to Kevin Curren, 1988 to Patrik Kühnen)
- Virginia Wade (1984 to Karina Carlson)
- Pat Cash (1991 to Thierry Champion)
- Michael Stich (1994 to Bryan Shelton)
- Andre Agassi (1996 to Doug Flach)
- Conchita Martínez (1998 to Sam Smith)
- Richard Krajicek (1999 to Lorenzo Manta)
- Pete Sampras (2002 to George Bastl)
- Serena Williams (2005 to Jill Craybas)
- Venus Williams (2006 to Jelena Janković)
- Martina Hingis (2007 to Laura Granville)

=== New No. 2 court ===
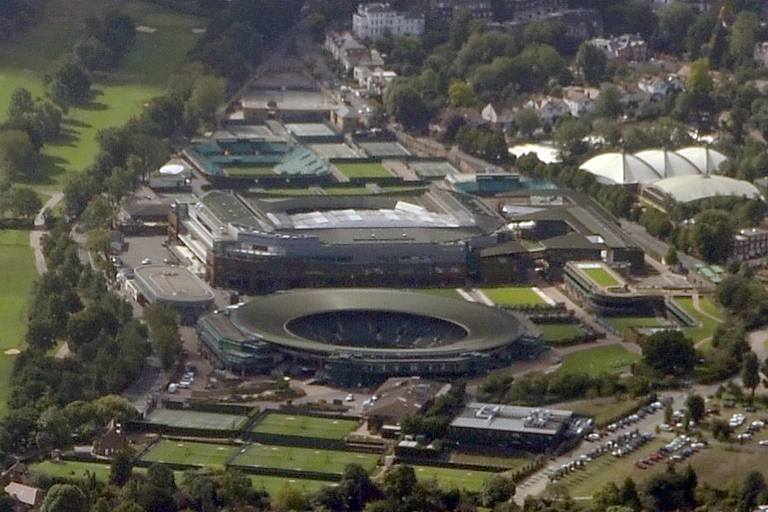
The new No. 2 court is the bluish-green stadium-like building in the background

For the 2009 Championships a new No. 2 court was built on the site of the previous No. 13 court, with a capacity of 4,000. The old No. 2 was briefly renamed No. 3 Court before its subsequent demolition.

== See also ==
- List of tennis stadiums by capacity
