= 2016 Wimbledon Championships – Wheelchair men's doubles =

Wheelchair men's doubles
- 2016 Wimbledon Championships

Final
- Champions: (United Kingdom) Alfie Hewett (United Kingdom) Gordon Reid
- Runners-up: (France) Stéphane Houdet (France) Nicolas Peifer
- Score: 4–6, 6–1, 7–6^{(8–6)}

Events
Singles	men	women		boys	girls
Doubles	men	women	mixed	boys	girls
WC Singles	men	women	quad
WC Doubles	men	women	quad
Legends	men	women	seniors
← 2015 ·	Wimbledon Championships	· 2017 →

Alfie Hewett and Gordon Reid defeated the defending champion Nicolas Peifer and his partner Stéphane Houdet in the final, 4–6, 6–1, 7–6^{(8–6)} to win the gentlemen's doubles wheelchair tennis title at the 2016 Wimbledon Championships. It was Hewett's maiden major title.

Gustavo Fernández and Peifer were the defending champions, but did not participate together. Fernández partnered Joachim Gérard, but was defeated by Hewett and Reid in the semifinals.

== Seeds ==
1. (France) Stéphane Houdet / (France) Nicolas Peifer (final)
2. (United Kingdom) Alfie Hewett / (United Kingdom) Gordon Reid (champions)

== Draw ==
=== Key ===
- Q = Qualifier
- WC = Wild card
- LL = Lucky loser
- Alt = Alternate
- ITF = ITF entry
- PR = Protected ranking
- SR = Special ranking
- SE = Special exempt
- JE = Junior exempt
- JR = Junior Accelerator Programme entrant
- CO = College Accelerator Programme entrant
- NG = Next Gen Accelerator Program entrant
- w/o = Walkover
- r = Retired
- d = Defaulted

=== Finals ===
Semifinals
1	(France) Stéphane Houdet (France) Nicolas Peifer	5	6	7^{8}
(Sweden) Stefan Olsson (Netherlands) Maikel Scheffers	7	1	6^{6}
(Argentina) Gustavo Fernández (Belgium) Joachim Gérard	3	2
2	(United Kingdom) Alfie Hewett (United Kingdom) Gordon Reid	6	6

Final
1	(France) Stéphane Houdet (France) Nicolas Peifer	6	1	6^{6}
2	(United Kingdom) Alfie Hewett (United Kingdom) Gordon Reid	4	6	7^{8}
