= 2016 Wimbledon Championships – Wheelchair men's singles =

Wheelchair men's singles
- 2016 Wimbledon Championships

Final
- Champions: (United Kingdom) Gordon Reid
- Runners-up: (Sweden) Stefan Olsson
- Score: 6–1, 6–4

Events
Singles	men	women		boys	girls
Doubles	men	women	mixed	boys	girls
WC Singles	men	women	quad
WC Doubles	men	women	quad
Legends	men	women	seniors
Wimbledon Championships	· 2017 →

Gordon Reid defeated Stefan Olsson in the final, 6–1, 6–4 to win the inaugural gentlemen's singles wheelchair tennis title at the 2016 Wimbledon Championships.

== Seeds ==
1. (France) Stéphane Houdet (semifinals)
2. (Belgium) Joachim Gérard (semifinals)

== Draw ==
=== Key ===
- Q = Qualifier
- WC = Wild card
- LL = Lucky loser
- Alt = Alternate
- ITF = ITF entry
- PR = Protected ranking
- SR = Special ranking
- SE = Special exempt
- JE = Junior exempt
- JR = Junior Accelerator Programme entrant
- CO = College Accelerator Programme entrant
- NG = Next Gen Accelerator Program entrant
- w/o = Walkover
- r = Retired
- d = Defaulted

=== Finals ===
Quarterfinals
1	(France) Stéphane Houdet	3	6	6
(Netherlands) Maikel Scheffers	6	3	1
(Argentina) Gustavo Fernández	7	2	2
(Sweden) Stefan Olsson	5	6	6
(France) Nicolas Peifer	3	4
(United Kingdom) Gordon Reid	6	6
WC	(United Kingdom) Alfie Hewett	0	4
2	(Belgium) Joachim Gérard	6	6

Semifinals
1	(France) Stéphane Houdet	6	3	3
(Sweden) Stefan Olsson	3	6	6
(United Kingdom) Gordon Reid	7^{11}	6
2	(Belgium) Joachim Gérard	6^{9}	4

Final
(Sweden) Stefan Olsson	1	4
(United Kingdom) Gordon Reid	6	6
