= 2016 Wimbledon Championships – Boys' doubles =

Boys' doubles
- 2016 Wimbledon Championships

Final
- Champions: (Estonia) Kenneth Raisma (Greece) Stefanos Tsitsipas
- Runners-up: (Canada) Félix Auger-Aliassime (Canada) Denis Shapovalov
- Score: 4–6, 6–4, 6–2

Events
Singles	men	women		boys	girls
Doubles	men	women	mixed	boys	girls
WC Singles	men	women	quad
WC Doubles	men	women	quad
Legends	men	women	seniors
- Wimbledon Championships

Lý Hoàng Nam and Sumit Nagal were the defending champions, but were both ineligible to compete this year.

Kenneth Raisma and Stefanos Tsitsipas won the title, defeating Félix Auger-Aliassime and Denis Shapovalov in the final, 4–6, 6–4, 6–2.

== Seeds ==
1. (Canada) Félix Auger-Aliassime / (Canada) Denis Shapovalov (final)
2. (Estonia) Kenneth Raisma / (Greece) Stefanos Tsitsipas (champions)
3. (Serbia) Miomir Kecmanović / (Norway) Casper Ruud (semifinals)
4. (Canada) Benjamin Sigouin / (Germany) Louis Wessels (semifinals)
5. (South Korea) Chung Yun-seong / (United Kingdom) Jay Clarke (first round)
6. (Argentina) Tomás Martín Etcheverry / (Argentina) Genaro Alberto Olivieri (first round)
7. (Australia) Alex De Minaur / (Australia) Blake Ellis (quarterfinals)
8. (United States) John McNally / (United States) J. J. Wolf (second round)

== Draw ==
Key

- Q = Qualifier
- WC = Wild card
- LL = Lucky loser
- Alt = Alternate
- ITF = ITF entry
- PR = Protected ranking
- SR = Special ranking
- SE = Special exempt
- JE = Junior exempt
- JR = Junior Accelerator Programme entrant
- CO = College Accelerator Programme entrant
- NG = Next Gen Accelerator Program entrant
- w/o = Walkover
- r = Retired
- d = Defaulted

=== Finals ===
Semifinals
1	(Canada) Félix Auger-Aliassime (Canada) Denis Shapovalov	7^{7}	3	6
3	(Serbia) Miomir Kecmanović (Norway) Casper Ruud	6^{1}	6	3
4	(Canada) Benjamin Sigouin (Germany) Louis Wessels	6^{5}	6^{7}
2	(Estonia) Kenneth Raisma (Greece) Stefanos Tsitsipas	7^{7}	7^{9}

Final
1	(Canada) Félix Auger-Aliassime (Canada) Denis Shapovalov	6	4	2
2	(Estonia) Kenneth Raisma (Greece) Stefanos Tsitsipas	4	6	6

=== Top half ===
First round
1	(Canada) Félix Auger-Aliassime (Canada) Denis Shapovalov	6	6
WC	(United Kingdom) Jake Hersey (United Kingdom) Aidan McHugh	2	2
(Argentina) Juan Martín Jalif (Argentina) Francisco Vittar	3	2
(Chinese Taipei) Wu Tung-lin (China) Wu Yibing	6	6
(Spain) Nicola Kuhn (United States) Sam Riffice	6	1	0
(Egypt) Youssef Hossam (Turkey) Ergi Kırkın	2	6	6
(Spain) Alejandro Davidovich Fokina (Australia) Alexei Popyrin	7^{7}	6
5	(South Korea) Chung Yun-seong (United Kingdom) Jay Clarke	6^{5}	2
3	(Serbia) Miomir Kecmanović (Norway) Casper Ruud	6	6
(Italy) Riccardo Balzerani (Italy) Enrico Dalla Valle	1	4
(United States) William Blumberg (United States) Nathan Ponwith	4	7^{7}	3
(Germany) Daniel Altmaier (Uzbekistan) Jurabek Karimov	6	6^{4}	6
(France) Dan Added (Portugal) Duarte Vale	7^{8}	6
WC	(United Kingdom) Jack Draper (United Kingdom) Anton Matusevich	6^{6}	2
(Russia) Lev Kazakov (Russia) Pavel Kotov	1	4
7	(Australia) Alex De Minaur (Australia) Blake Ellis	6	6

Second round
1	(Canada) F Auger-Aliassime (Canada) D Shapovalov	7	6
(Chinese Taipei) T-l Wu (China) Y Wu	5	1
(Egypt) Y Hossam (Turkey) E Kırkın	3	6	7
(Spain) A Davidovich Fokina (Australia) A Popyrin	6	1	5
3	(Serbia) M Kecmanović (Norway) C Ruud	w/o
(Germany) D Altmaier (Uzbekistan) J Karimov
(France) D Added (Portugal) D Vale	3	0
7	(Australia) A De Minaur (Australia) B Ellis	6	6

Quarterfinals
1	(Canada) F Auger-Aliassime (Canada) D Shapovalov	6	7^{7}
(Egypt) Y Hossam (Turkey) E Kırkın	0	6^{0}
3	(Serbia) M Kecmanović (Norway) C Ruud	7^{7}	6
7	(Australia) A De Minaur (Australia) B Ellis	6^{3}	3

Semifinals
1	(Canada) F Auger-Aliassime (Canada) D Shapovalov	7^{7}	3	6
3	(Serbia) M Kecmanović (Norway) C Ruud	6^{1}	6	3

=== Bottom half ===
First round
8	(United States) John McNally (United States) J. J. Wolf	6	6
(United States) Trent Bryde (France) Evan Furness	3	2
(Slovakia) Lukáš Klein (Japan) Yosuke Watanuki	6	7
(Poland) Piotr Matuszewski (Poland) Kacper Żuk	4	5
(Japan) Toru Horie (Japan) Yuta Shimizu	6	6
(United States) Olukayode Ayeni (Spain) Eduard Güell Bartrina	2	4
WC	(United Kingdom) Finn Bass (United Kingdom) Alastair Gray	6^{6}	3
4	(Canada) Benjamin Sigouin (Germany) Louis Wessels	7^{8}	6
6	(Argentina) Tomás Martín Etcheverry (Argentina) Genaro Alberto Olivieri	6^{3}	4
(Brazil) Gabriel Décamps (Germany) Marvin Möller	7^{7}	6
WC	(United Kingdom) Ben Draper (United Kingdom) Jack Molloy	3	2
(United States) Ulises Blanch (United States) Vasil Kirkov	6	6
(Estonia) Mattias Siimar (Hong Kong) Anthony Jackie Tang	7^{7}	6
(France) Elliot Benchetrit (France) Geoffrey Blancaneaux	6^{3}	4
(Germany) Tim Rühl (Uzbekistan) Khumoyun Sultonov	4	2
2	(Estonia) Kenneth Raisma (Greece) Stefanos Tsitsipas	6	6

Second round
8	(United States) J McNally (United States) J. J. Wolf	0	6^{2}
(Slovakia) L Klein (Japan) Y Watanuki	6	7^{7}
(Japan) T Horie (Japan) Y Shimizu	4	2
4	(Canada) B Sigouin (Germany) L Wessels	6	6
(Brazil) G Décamps (Germany) M Möller	1	3
(United States) U Blanch (United States) V Kirkov	6	6
(Estonia) M Siimar (Hong Kong) AJ Tang	6	4	2
2	(Estonia) K Raisma (Greece) S Tsitsipas	4	6	6

Quarterfinals
(Slovakia) L Klein (Japan) Y Watanuki	6^{6}	6	3
4	(Canada) B Sigouin (Germany) L Wessels	7^{8}	4	6
(United States) U Blanch (United States) V Kirkov	6	3	4
2	(Estonia) K Raisma (Greece) S Tsitsipas	3	6	6

Semifinals
4	(Canada) B Sigouin (Germany) L Wessels	6^{5}	6^{7}
2	(Estonia) K Raisma (Greece) S Tsitsipas	7^{7}	7^{9}
