= 2016 Wimbledon Championships – Senior gentlemen's invitation doubles =

Senior gentlemen's invitation doubles
- 2016 Wimbledon Championships

Final
- Champions: (Australia) Todd Woodbridge (Australia) Mark Woodforde
- Runners-up: (Netherlands) Jacco Eltingh (Netherlands) Paul Haarhuis
- Score: 6–2, 7–5

Events
Singles	men	women		boys	girls
Doubles	men	women	mixed	boys	girls
WC Singles	men	women	quad
WC Doubles	men	women	quad
Legends	men	women	seniors
← 2015 ·	Wimbledon Championships	· 2017 →

Todd Woodbridge and Mark Woodforde defeated the defending champions Jacco Eltingh and Paul Haarhuis in the final, 6–2, 7–5 to win the senior gentlemen's invitation doubles tennis title at the 2016 Wimbledon Championships.

== Draw ==
=== Key ===
- Q = Qualifier
- WC = Wild card
- LL = Lucky loser
- Alt = Alternate
- ITF = ITF entry
- PR = Protected ranking
- SR = Special ranking
- SE = Special exempt
- JE = Junior exempt
- JR = Junior Accelerator Programme entrant
- CO = College Accelerator Programme entrant
- NG = Next Gen Accelerator Program entrant
- w/o = Walkover
- r = Retired
- d = Defaulted

=== Final ===
Final
(Australia) Todd Woodbridge (Australia) Mark Woodforde	6	7
(Netherlands) Jacco Eltingh (Netherlands) Paul Haarhuis	2	5

=== Group A ===
		(Iran) Bahrami (United States) McEnroe	(United Kingdom) Bates (Sweden) Järryd	(United States) Leach (France) Pioline	(Australia) Woodbridge (Australia) Woodforde	RR; W–L	Set; W–L	Game; W–L	Standings
A1	(Iran) Mansour Bahrami (United States) Patrick McEnroe		3–6, 3–6	6–4, 6–3	7–5, 2–6, [7–10]	1–2	3–4	27–31	2
A2	(United Kingdom) Jeremy Bates (Sweden) Anders Järryd	6–3, 6–3		5–7, 4–6	3–6, 2–6	1–2	2–4	26–31	3
A3	(United States) Rick Leach (France) Cédric Pioline	4–6, 3–6	7–5, 6–4		4–6, 2–6	1–2	2–4	26–33	4
A4	(Australia) Todd Woodbridge (Australia) Mark Woodforde	5–7, 6–2, [10–7]	6–3, 6–2	6–4, 6–2		3–0	6–1	36–20	1

Standings are determined by: 1. number of wins; 2. number of matches; 3. in two-players-ties, head-to-head records; 4. in three-players-ties, percentage of sets won, or of games won; 5. steering-committee decision.

=== Group B ===
		(Netherlands) Eltingh (Netherlands) Haarhuis	(Spain) Casal (Spain) Sánchez	(France) Leconte (United States) Tarango	(United Kingdom) Petchey (United Kingdom) Wilkinson	RR; W–L	Set; W–L	Game; W–L	Standings
B1	(Netherlands) Jacco Eltingh (Netherlands) Paul Haarhuis		6–3, 6–4	6–3, 7–5	7–6^{(7–2)}, 6–3	3–0	6–0	38–24	1
B2	(Spain) Sergio Casal (Spain) Emilio Sánchez	3–6, 4–6		2–6, 4–6	5–7, 2–6	0–3	0–6	20–37	4
B3	(France) Henri Leconte (United States) Jeff Tarango	3–6, 5–7	6–2, 6–4		3–6, 3–6	1–2	2–4	26–31	3
B4	(United Kingdom) Mark Petchey (United Kingdom) Chris Wilkinson	6–7^{(2–7)}, 3–6	7–5, 6–2	6–3, 6–3		2–1	4–2	34–26	2

Standings are determined by: 1. number of wins; 2. number of matches; 3. in two-players-ties, head-to-head records; 4. in three-players-ties, percentage of sets won, or of games won; 5. steering-committee decision.
