= 2016 Wimbledon Championships – Ladies' invitation doubles =

Ladies' invitation doubles
- 2016 Wimbledon Championships

Final
- Champions: (United States) Martina Navratilova (Tunisia) Selima Sfar
- Runners-up: (United States) Lindsay Davenport (United States) Mary Joe Fernandez
- Score: 7–6^{(7–5)}, ret.

Events
Singles	men	women		boys	girls
Doubles	men	women	mixed	boys	girls
WC Singles	men	women	quad
WC Doubles	men	women	quad
Legends	men	women	seniors
← 2015 ·	Wimbledon Championships	· 2017 →

Magdalena Maleeva and Rennae Stubbs were the defending champions but were eliminated in the round robin.

Martina Navratilova and Selima Sfar defeated Lindsay Davenport and Mary Joe Fernandez in the final, 7–6^{(7–5)}, ret. to win the ladies' invitation doubles tennis title at the 2016 Wimbledon Championships.

== Draw ==
=== Key ===
- Q = Qualifier
- WC = Wild card
- LL = Lucky loser
- Alt = Alternate
- ITF = ITF entry
- PR = Protected ranking
- SR = Special ranking
- SE = Special exempt
- JE = Junior exempt
- JR = Junior Accelerator Programme entrant
- CO = College Accelerator Programme entrant
- NG = Next Gen Accelerator Program entrant
- w/o = Walkover
- r = Retired
- d = Defaulted

=== Final ===
Final
(United States) Lindsay Davenport (United States) Mary Joe Fernández	6^{5}	0^{r}
(United States) Martina Navratilova (Tunisia) Selima Sfar	7^{7}	0

=== Group A ===
		(United States) Austin (France) Testud	(United States) Davenport (United States) Fernández	(Bulgaria) Maleeva (Australia) Stubbs	(Austria) Schett (France) Tauziat	RR; W–L	Set; W–L	Game; W–L	Standings
A1	(United States) Tracy Austin (France) Sandrine Testud		3–6, 3–6	3–6, 4–6	1–6, 5–7	0–3	0–6	19–37	4
A2	(United States) Lindsay Davenport (United States) Mary Joe Fernández	6–3, 6–3		6–4, 7–5	6–2, 6–3	3–0	6–0	37–20	1
A3	(Bulgaria) Magdalena Maleeva (Australia) Rennae Stubbs	6–3, 6–4	4–6, 5–7		6–1, 6–3	2–1	4–2	33–24	2
A4	(Austria) Barbara Schett (France) Nathalie Tauziat	6–1, 7–5	2–6, 3–6	1–6, 3–6		1–2	2–4	22–30	3

Standings are determined by: 1. number of wins; 2. number of matches; 3. in two-players-ties, head-to-head records; 4. in three-players-ties, percentage of sets won, or of games won; 5. steering-committee decision.

=== Group B ===
		(United Kingdom) Keothavong (United Kingdom) South	(Croatia) Majoli (Spain) Sánchez Vicario	(United States) Navratilova (Tunisia) Sfar	(Czech Republic) Novotná (Czech Republic) Suková	RR; W–L	Set; W–L	Game; W–L	Standings
B1	(United Kingdom) Anne Keothavong (United Kingdom) Melanie South		6–4, 6–2	1–6, 3–6	3–6, 3–6	1–2	2–4	22–30	3
B2	(Croatia) Iva Majoli (Spain) Arantxa Sánchez Vicario	4–6, 2–6		4–6, 1–6	6–2, 6–4	1–2	2–4	23–30	2
B3	(United States) Martina Navratilova (Tunisia) Selima Sfar	6–1, 6–3	6–4, 6–1		6–1, 6–2	3–0	6–0	36–12	1
B4	(Czech Republic) Jana Novotná (Czech Republic) Helena Suková	6–3, 6–3	2–6, 4–6	1–6, 2–6		1–2	2–4	21–30	4

Standings are determined by: 1. number of wins; 2. number of matches; 3. in two-players-ties, head-to-head records; 4. in three-players-ties, percentage of sets won, or of games won; 5. steering-committee decision.
