= No. 1 Court (Wimbledon) =

Tennis court at the All England Lawn Tennis and Croquet Club, Wimbledon, London

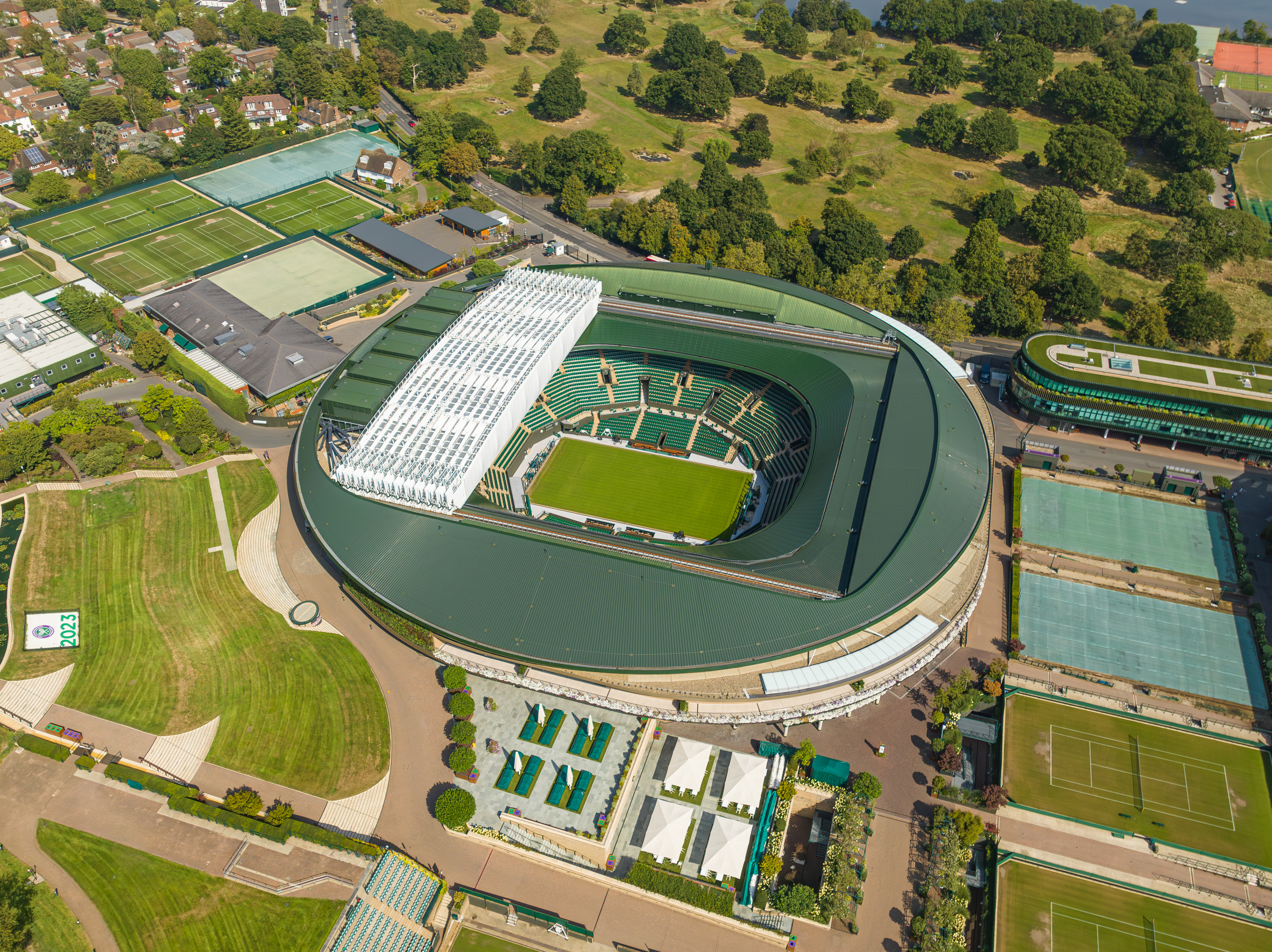
- Aerial view of No. 1 Court
- Interactive map of No. 1 Court
- Location: All England Lawn Tennis and Croquet Club; Wimbledon, London, SW19
- Coordinates: 51°26′07″N 0°12′53.30″W
- Owner: AELTC
- Capacity: 12,345 seats
- Surface: Grass
- Public transit: Southfields

Construction
- Opened: 23 June 1997
- Renovated: 2019 (retractable roof)
- Cost: £70,000,000 (2019 renovated)

Tenant
- Wimbledon Championships

No. 1 Court is a tennis court at the All England Lawn Tennis and Croquet Club, Wimbledon, London. The current No. 1 Court stadium was opened in 1997 and has a capacity of 12,345. It is used primarily for the Wimbledon Championships and it occasionally hosts Great Britain's home Davis Cup ties.

The current No. 1 Court superseded the original, now-demolished No. 1 Court, which had stood on the west side of Centre Court since 1924 and was used in 67 Wimbledon Championships. The old No. 1 Court had a spectator capacity of 7,328 at its largest. The old court was replaced by the Millennium Building, the media centre and facilities for players, members, and officials.

== History ==
=== Former No. 1 Court ===
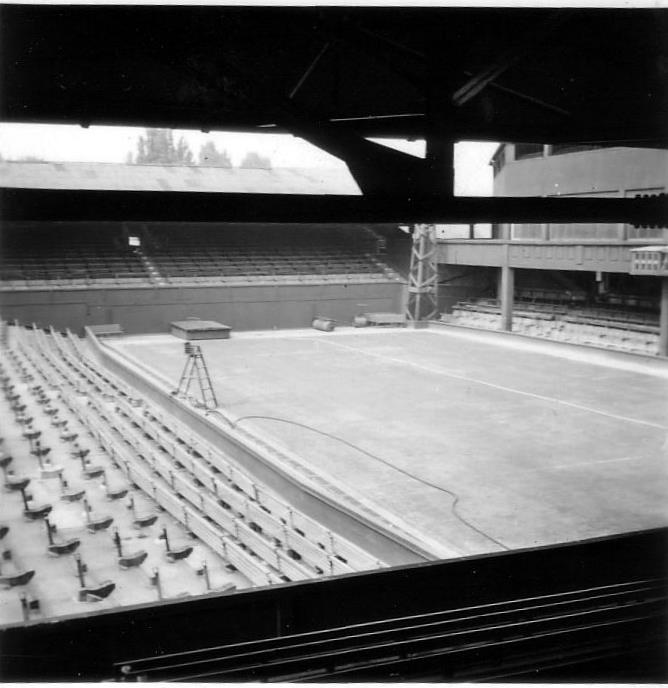
The former No. 1 Court

The original No. 1 Court was built in 1924 and was attached to the west side of Centre Court. (Note: The first match played on the court was between the British players Brian Gilbert and Noel Turnbull. The following day, the first ladies' match was played between Suzanne Lenglen and Sylvia Lumley-Ellis.) Originally it had a capacity of about 3,250 (2,500 seats and approximately 750 standing) which was increased over the years to 7,328 (Note: 700 seats were added in 1929, 450 in 1939, 900 in 1955 and 1,250 in 1981 resulting in a final seating capacity of 6,508.) It was smaller than the current No. 1 Court and was said to have had a unique, more intimate atmosphere, making it a favourite of many players.

The Wightman Cup, an annual team tennis competition for women contested between teams from the United States and Great Britain, was held on Court No. 1 from 1946 to 1972.

The old court was superseded in 1997 by the current No. 1 Court, situated to the north of Centre Court in Aorangi Park. The old No. 1 Court was demolished because its capacity for spectators was too low. The site of the old court is now occupied by the Millennium Building, the media centre, and facilities for players, members, and officials.

=== Current No. 1 Court ===
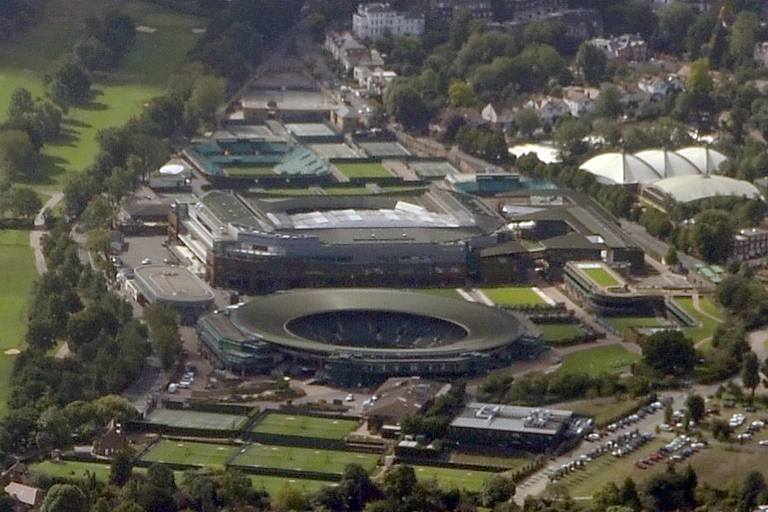
The round green building in the foreground is the No. 1 Court before the retractable roof was added

The current No. 1 Court in Aorangi Park was built in 1997, at which time it had a spectator capacity of 11,432. It was opened on 23 June 1997 for the 1997 Wimbledon Championships. As part of the opening ceremony, a salver was presented to 10 former champions who had won at least three singles titles. (Note: The recipients of the silver salver were Louise Brough, Rod Laver, Margaret Court, Billie Jean King, John Newcombe, Chris Evert, Martina Navratilova, John McEnroe, Boris Becker and Pete Sampras. The only surviving absentees were Maria Bueno, Björn Borg who declined to attend and Steffi Graf who was recovering from knee surgery.) The first match played on the new court was between Tim Henman and Daniel Nestor.

No. 1 Court also occasionally plays host to Great Britain's home Davis Cup ties, because Centre Court is reserved for the Grand Slam tournament, with the one exception of the 2012 Olympic Games; the Olympic tournament used Centre Court, No. 1 Court and other courts.

==== Retractable roof ====
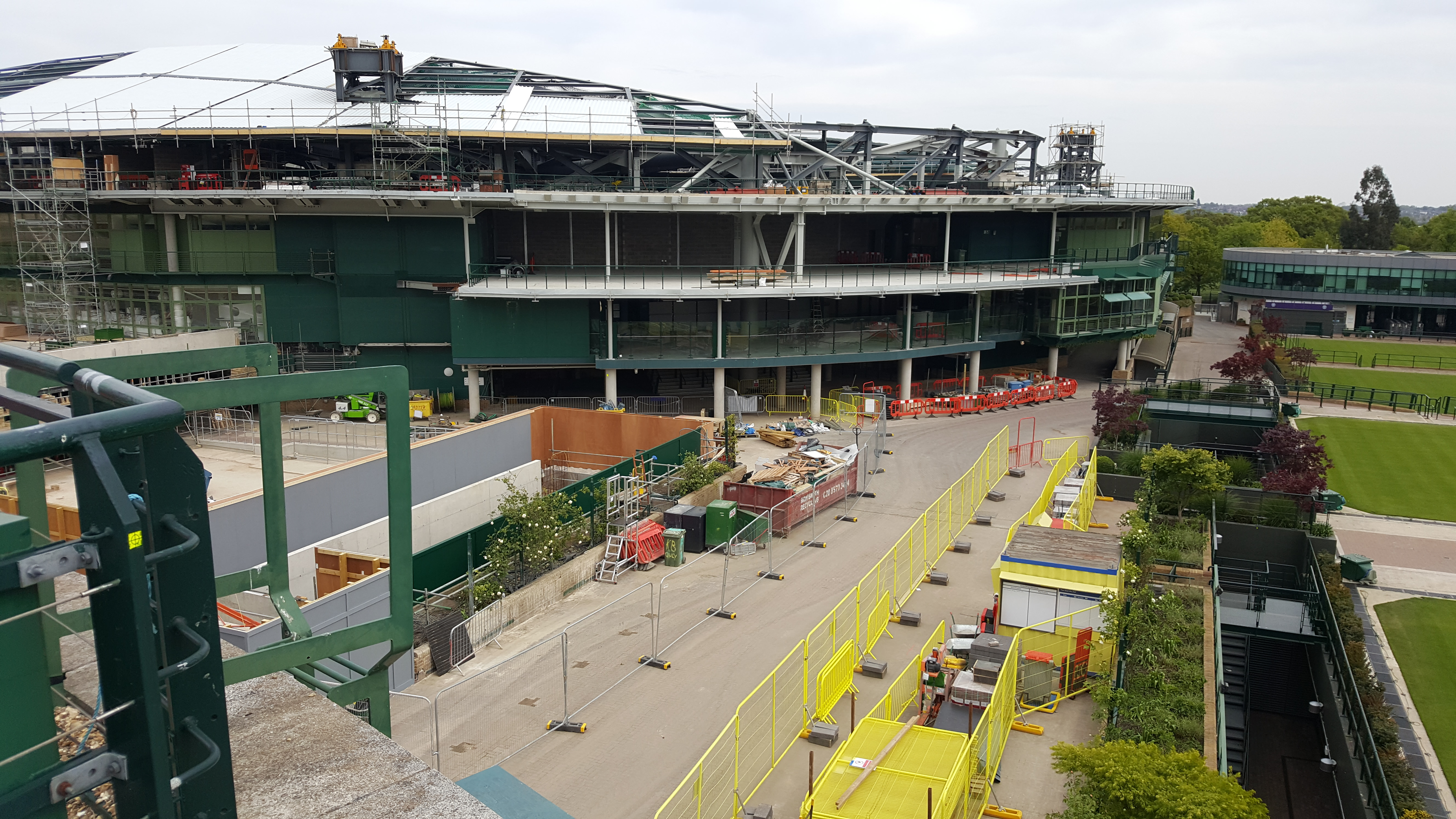
No. 1 Court seen under renovation works in April 2017.

In April 2013, the All England Club confirmed its intention to build a retractable roof over No. 1 Court. As well as a retractable roof, the seating capacity of the court was increased by approximately 1,000 to seat 12,345 people.

The roof was completed in time for the 2019 Championships, with it being unveiled at a celebratory event attended by legendary former players in May 2019. The roof was closed for the first time in a competitive match on 3 July 2019 when Coco Gauff played Magdaléna Rybáriková, the match being moved from an outside court. The roof was closed again on 4 July 2019 during the Men's Doubles first round match featuring Andy Murray and Pierre-Hugues Herbert.

=== Longest match ===
The longest recorded match played on No. 1 Court lasted 4 hours and 36 minutes and was contested between Andy Roddick and Lu Yen-hsun in the fourth round of the 2010 Wimbledon Championships men's singles draw. In this match, which ended with a score of 4-6, 7-6(3), 7-6(4), 6-7(5), 9-7, Lu got his first-ever victory against Roddick and became the first Asian man to reach a Grand Slam quarterfinal since 1995.

== See also ==
- Centre Court
- List of tennis stadiums by capacity
