= 2016 Wimbledon Championships – Gentlemen's invitation doubles =

Gentlemen's invitation doubles
- 2016 Wimbledon Championships

Final
- Champions: (United Kingdom) Greg Rusedski (France) Fabrice Santoro
- Runners-up: (Sweden) Jonas Björkman (Sweden) Thomas Johansson
- Score: 6–3, 1–6, [10–5]

Events
Singles	men	women		boys	girls
Doubles	men	women	mixed	boys	girls
WC Singles	men	women	quad
WC Doubles	men	women	quad
Legends	men	women	seniors
← 2015 ·	Wimbledon Championships	· 2017 →

Goran Ivanišević and Ivan Ljubičić were the defending champions but Ljubičić chose not to compete this year. Ivanišević played alongside Thomas Enqvist, but they were eliminated in the round robin.

Greg Rusedski and Fabrice Santoro defeated Jonas Björkman and Thomas Johansson in the final, 7–5, 6–1 to win the gentlemen's invitation doubles tennis title at the 2016 Wimbledon Championships.

== Draw ==
=== Key ===
- Q = Qualifier
- WC = Wild card
- LL = Lucky loser
- Alt = Alternate
- ITF = ITF entry
- PR = Protected ranking
- SR = Special ranking
- SE = Special exempt
- JE = Junior exempt
- JR = Junior Accelerator Programme entrant
- CO = College Accelerator Programme entrant
- NG = Next Gen Accelerator Program entrant
- w/o = Walkover
- r = Retired
- d = Defaulted

=== Final ===
Final
(United Kingdom) Greg Rusedski (France) Fabrice Santoro	7	6
(Sweden) Jonas Björkman (Sweden) Thomas Johansson	5	1

=== Group A ===
		(United States) Chang (Australia) Philippoussis	(South Africa) Ferreira (France) Grosjean	(United States) Gimelstob (United Kingdom) Hutchins	(United Kingdom) Rusedski (France) Santoro	RR; W–L	Set; W–L	Game; W–L	Standings
A1	(United States) Michael Chang (Australia) Mark Philippoussis		4–6, 5–7	6–2, 3–6, [4–10]	3–6, 4–6	0–3	1–6	25–34	4
A2	(South Africa) Wayne Ferreira (France) Sébastien Grosjean	6–4, 7–5		3–6, 6–3, [8–10]	3–6, 4–6	1–2	3–4	29–31	3
A3	(United States) Justin Gimelstob (United Kingdom) Ross Hutchins	2–6, 6–3, [10–4]	6–3, 3–6, [10–8]		2–6, 6–3, [6–10]	2–1	5–4	27–28	2
A4	(United Kingdom) Greg Rusedski (France) Fabrice Santoro	6–3, 6–4	6–3, 6–4	6–2, 3–6, [10–6]		3–0	6–1	34–22	1

Standings are determined by: 1. number of wins; 2. number of matches; 3. in two-players-ties, head-to-head records; 4. in three-players-ties, percentage of sets won, or of games won; 5. steering-committee decision.

=== Group B ===
		(Sweden) Björkman (Sweden) Johansson	(United Kingdom) Delgado (Netherlands) Krajicek	(Sweden) Enqvist (Croatia) Ivanišević	(Chile) González (Spain) Moyá	RR; W–L	Set; W–L	Game; W–L	Standings
B1	(Sweden) Jonas Björkman (Sweden) Thomas Johansson		3–6, 6–4, [6–10]	6–3, 6–4	7–6^{(8–6)}, 2–6, [10–4]	2–1	5–3	31–30	1
B2	(United Kingdom) Jamie Delgado (Netherlands) Richard Krajicek	6–3, 4–6, [10–6]		3–6, 3–6	2–6, 6–3, [6–10]	1–2	3–5	25–31	4
B3	(Sweden) Thomas Enqvist (Croatia) Goran Ivanišević	3–6, 4–6	6–3, 6–3		6–7^{(4–7)}, 6–7^{(1–7)}	1–2	2–4	31–32	3
B4	(Chile) Fernando González (Spain) Carlos Moyá	6–7^{(6–8)}, 6–2, [4–10]	6–2, 3–6, [10–6]	7–6^{(7–4)}, 7–6^{(7–1)}		2–1	5–3	36–30	2

Standings are determined by: 1. number of wins; 2. number of matches; 3. in two-players-ties, head-to-head records; 4. in three-players-ties, percentage of sets won, or of games won; 5. steering-committee decision.
