= Tommy Paul career statistics =

Career finals
Discipline	Type	Won	Lost	Total	WR^{1}
Singles	Grand Slam	–	–	–	–
Singles	ATP Finals	–	–	–	–
Singles	ATP Masters 1000	–	–	–	–
Singles	ATP Tour 500	1	3	4	0.25
Singles	ATP Tour 250	4	3	7	0.57
Singles	Olympic Games	–	–	–	–
Singles	Total	5	6	11	0.45
Doubles	Grand Slam	–	–	–	–
Doubles	ATP Finals	–	–	–	–
Doubles	ATP Masters 1000	–	–	–	–
Doubles	ATP Tour 500	–	–	–	–
Doubles	ATP Tour 250	–	–	–	–
Doubles	Olympic Games	–	–	–	–
Doubles	Total	–	–	–	–
^{1)} WR = Winning Rate

These are the career statistics for American tennis player Tommy Paul. All information is according to the ATP.

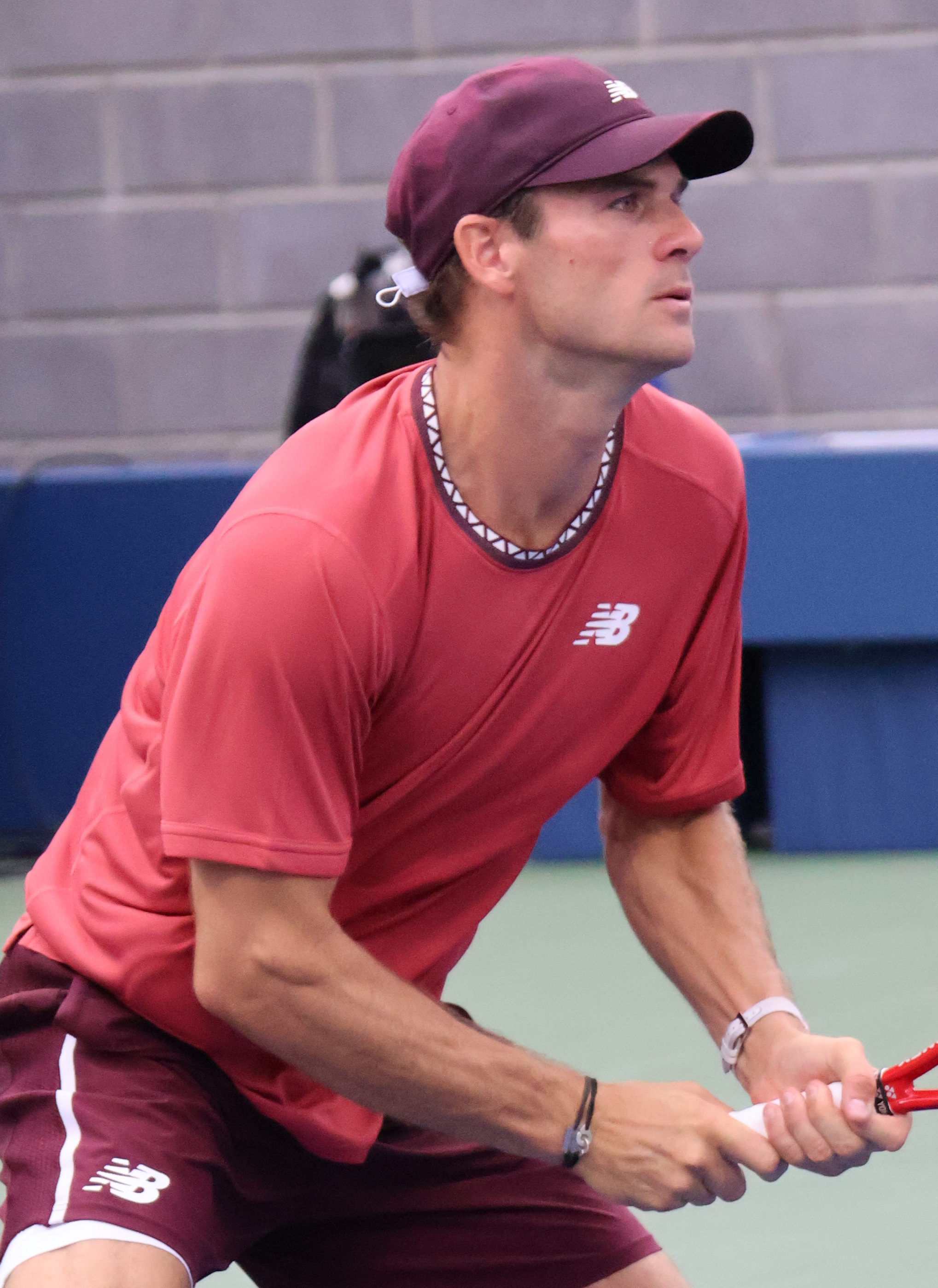
Paul at the 2023 US Open

== Performance timelines ==
Key
W	F	SF	QF	#R	RR	Q#	P#	DNQ	A	Z#	PO	G	S	B	NMS	NTI	P	NH

(W) winner; (F) finalist; (SF) semifinalist; (QF) quarterfinalist; (#R) rounds 4, 3, 2, 1; (RR) round-robin stage; (Q#) qualification round; (P#) preliminary round; (DNQ) did not qualify; (A) absent; (Z#) Davis/Fed Cup Zonal Group (with number indication) or (PO) play-off; (G) gold, (S) silver or (B) bronze Olympic/Paralympic medal; (NMS) not a Masters tournament; (NTI) not a Tier I tournament; (P) postponed; (NH) not held; (SR) strike rate (events won / competed); (W–L) win–loss record.
To avoid confusion and double counting, these charts are updated at the conclusion of a tournament or when the player's participation has ended.

=== Singles ===
Current through the 2026 Japan Open.

Tournament	2015	2016	2017	2018	2019	2020	2021	2022	2023	2024	2025	2026	SR	W–L	Win %
Grand Slam tournaments
Australian Open	A	A	A	Q2	Q2	3R	2R	2R	SF	3R	QF	4R	0 / 7	18–7	72%
French Open	A	Q2	A	A	1R	2R	2R	1R	2R	3R	QF	3R	0 / 8	11–8	58%
Wimbledon	A	Q1	A	A	Q3	NH	A	4R	3R	QF	2R	3R	0 / 5	12–5	71%
US Open	1R	Q1	1R	A	Q2	1R	1R	3R	4R	4R	3R	4R	0 / 9	13–9	59%
Win–loss	0–1	0–0	0–1	0–0	0–1	3–3	2–3	6–4	11–4	11–4	11–4	10–4	0 / 29	54–29	65%
National representation
Summer Olympics	NH	A	NH				1R	NH		QF	NH		0 / 2	3–2	60%
Davis Cup	A	A	A	A	A	RR		QF	RR	QF	A		0 / 5	6–3	63%
ATP 1000 tournaments
Indian Wells Open	A	Q2	A	A	A	NH	4R	3R	4R	SF	4R	3R	0 / 6	14–6	70%
Miami Open	A	1R	A	A	A	NH	1R	3R	4R	2R	3R	QF	0 / 7	8–7	53%
Monte-Carlo Masters	A	A	A	A	A	NH	2R	A	A	A	A	A	0 / 1	1–1	50%
Madrid Open	A	A	A	A	A	NH	2R	1R	2R	3R	4R	2R	0 / 6	4–6	40%
Italian Open	A	A	A	A	A	Q1	1R	2R	2R	SF	SF	3R	0 / 6	10–6	63%
Canadian Open	A	A	A	A	2R	NH	2R	QF	SF	2R	A	3R	0 / 6	11–6	65%
Cincinnati Open	Q1	A	2R	A	A	1R	2R	2R	3R	1R	3R	QF	0 / 8	9–8	53%
Shanghai Masters	A	A	A	A	A	NH			4R	4R	A		0 / 2	4–2	67%
Paris Masters	A	A	A	A	A	2R	2R	QF	2R	1R	A		0 / 5	6–5	55%
Win–loss	0–0	0–1	1–1	0–0	1–1	1–2	8–8	12–7	13–8	12–8	10–5	9–6	0 / 47	67–47	59%
Career statistics
Tournaments	1	4	4	2	4	13	24	26	25	22	14	18	Career total: 157		
Titles	0	0	0	0	0	0	1	0	0	3	0	1	Career total: 5		
Finals	0	0	0	0	0	0	1	0	2	4	0	4	Career total: 11		
Overall win–loss	0–1	1–4	6–4	2–2	2–4	15–13	25–23	39–27	41–28	45–19	29–13	39–18	244–156		
Win–loss %	0%	20%	60%	50%	33%	54%	52%	59%	59%	70%	69%	72%	61%		
Year-end ranking	276	282	152	202	90	54	43	32	13	12	20		$14,988,868		

=== Doubles ===
Tournament	2015	2016	2017	2018	2019	2020	2021	2022	2023	2024	2025	2026	SR	W–L
Grand Slam tournaments
Australian Open	A	A	A	A	A	1R	2R	A	A	A	A	A	0 / 2	1–2
French Open	A	A	A	A	A	QF	1R	3R	A	A	A	A	0 / 3	5–3
Wimbledon	A	A	A	A	A	NH	A	2R	A	A	A		0 / 1	1–1
US Open	1R	2R	1R	A	A	A	1R	A	A	A	A		0 / 4	1–4
Win–loss	0–1	1–1	0–1	0–0	0–0	3–2	1–3	3–2	0–0	0–0	0–0	0–0	0 / 10	8–10

== Significant finals ==
=== Summer Olympics ===
==== Doubles: 1 (bronze medal) ====
Result	Year	Tournament	Surface	Partner	Opponents	Score
Bronze	2024	Paris Summer Olympics	Clay	(United States) Taylor Fritz	(Czech Republic) Tomáš Macháč (Czech Republic) Adam Pavlásek	6–3, 6–4

== ATP Tour finals ==
=== Singles: 11 (5 titles, 6 runner-ups) ===
Legend Grand Slam (–) ATP 1000 (–) ATP 500 (1–3) ATP 250 (4–3)	Finals by surface Hard (3–3) Clay (1–1) Grass (1–2)	Finals by setting Outdoor (2–6) Indoor (3–0)

Result	W–L	Date	Tournament	Tier	Surface	Opponent	Score
Win	1–0	Nov 2021	Stockholm Open, Sweden	ATP 250	Hard (i)	(Canada) Denis Shapovalov	6–4, 2–6, 6–4
Loss	1–1	Feb 2023	Mexican Open, Mexico	ATP 500	Hard	(Australia) Alex de Minaur	6–3, 4–6, 1–6
Loss	1–2	Jun 2023	Eastbourne International, UK	ATP 250	Grass	(Argentina) Francisco Cerúndolo	4–6, 6–1, 4–6
Win	2–2	Feb 2024	Dallas Open, US	ATP 250	Hard (i)	(United States) Marcos Giron	7–6^{(7–3)}, 5–7, 6–3
Loss	2–3	Feb 2024	Delray Beach Open, US	ATP 250	Hard	(United States) Taylor Fritz	2–6, 3–6
Win	3–3	Jun 2024	Queen's Club Championships, UK	ATP 500	Grass	(Italy) Lorenzo Musetti	6–1, 7–6^{(10–8)}
Win	4–3	Oct 2024	Stockholm Open, Sweden (2)	ATP 250	Hard (i)	(Bulgaria) Grigor Dimitrov	6–4, 6–3
Loss	4–4	Feb 2026	Delray Beach Open, US	ATP 250	Hard	(United States) Sebastian Korda	4–6, 3–6
Win	5–4	Apr 2026	U.S. Men's Clay Court Championships, US	ATP 250	Clay	(Argentina) Román Andrés Burruchaga	6–1, 3–6, 7–5
Loss	5–5	May 2026	Hamburg Open, Germany	ATP 500	Clay	(Peru) Ignacio Buse	6–7^{(6–8)}, 6–4, 3–6
Loss	5–6	Jun 2026	Queen's Club Championships, UK	ATP 500	Grass	(Argentina) Francisco Cerúndolo	7–6^{(7–4)}, 4–6, 3–6

== ATP Challenger and ITF Futures finals ==
=== Singles: 16 (10 titles, 6 runner-ups) ===
Legend ATP Challenger Tour (4–3) ITF Futures (6–3)	Finals by surface Hard (4–3) Clay (6–3)

Result	W–L	Date	Tournament	Tier	Surface	Opponent	Score
Loss	0–1	Nov 2015	Charlottesville Men's Pro Challenger, US	Challenger	Hard (i)	(United States) Noah Rubin	6–3, 6–7^{(7–9)}, 3–6
Win	1–1	Nov 2018	Charlottesville Men's Pro Challenger, US	Challenger	Hard (i)	(Canada) Peter Polansky	6–2, 6–2
Win	2–1	Apr 2019	Sarasota Open, US	Challenger	Clay	(United States) Tennys Sandgren	6–3, 6–4
Loss	2–2	Apr 2019	Tallahassee Tennis Challenger, US	Challenger	Clay	(Ecuador) Emilio Gómez	2–6, 2–6
Win	3–2	Sep 2019	Oracle Challenger Series – New Haven, US	Challenger	Hard	(United States) Marcos Giron	6–3, 6–3
Win	4–2	Sep 2019	Tiburon Challenger, US	Challenger	Hard	(Australia) Thanasi Kokkinakis	7–5, 6–7^{(3–7)}, 6–4
Loss	4–3	May 2023	Open du Pays d'Aix, France	Challenger	Clay	(United Kingdom) Andy Murray	6–2, 1–6, 2–6

Result	W–L	Date	Tournament	Tier	Surface	Opponent	Score
Win	1–0	May 2015	F13 Valldoreix, Spain	Futures	Clay	(Spain) Albert Alcaraz Ivorra	2–6, 6–4, 6–4
Win	2–0	May 2015	F11 Lecco, Italy	Futures	Clay	(Italy) Lorenzo Sonego	6–1, 6–4
Win	3–0	Jan 2016	F3 Plantation, US	Futures	Clay	(France) Adrien Puget	7–6^{(7–4)}, 6–0
Win	4–0	Jan 2016	F4 Sunrise, US	Futures	Clay	(France) Adrien Puget	6–4, 3–6, 6–3
Win	5–0	Feb 2017	F6 Palm Coast, US	Futures	Clay	(Japan) Renta Tokuda	6–3, 4–6, 6–3
Loss	5–1	Mar 2017	F9 Orlando, US	Futures	Clay	(Germany) Dominik Koepfer	6–4, 3–6, 5–7
Win	6–1	Jun 2017	F19 Winston-Salem, US	Futures	Hard	(United States) Christopher Eubanks	6–4, 6–4
Loss	6–2	Jul 2017	F21 Tulsa, US	Futures	Hard	(United States) Christian Harrison	6–3, 2–6, 1–6
Loss	6–3	Jun 2018	F15 Winston-Salem, US	Futures	Hard	(United States) Michael Redlicki	3–6, 6–3, 1–6

=== Doubles: 3 (2 titles, 1 runner-up) ===
Legend ATP Challenger Tour (2–0) ITF Futures (0–1)	Finals by surface Hard (2–1) Clay (–)

Result	W–L	Date	Tournament	Tier	Surface	Partner	Opponents	Score
Win	1–0	Jan 2018	Playford Tennis International, Australia	Challenger	Hard	(United States) Mackenzie McDonald	(Australia) Maverick Banes (Australia) Jason Kubler	7–6^{(7–4)}, 6–4
Win	2–0	Sep 2018	Columbus Challenger, US	Challenger	Hard (i)	(Canada) Peter Polansky	(Ecuador) Gonzalo Escobar (Ecuador) Roberto Quiroz	6–3, 6–3

Result	W–L	Date	Tournament	Tier	Surface	Partner	Opponents	Score
Loss	0–1	Jul 2017	F21 Tulsa, US	Futures	Hard	(United States) Nathan Ponwith	(United States) Austin Krajicek (United States) Jackson Withrow	4–6, 2–6

== Junior Grand Slam finals ==
=== Singles: 2 (1 title, 1 runner-up) ===
Result	Year	Tournament	Surface	Opponent	Score
Win	2015	French Open	Clay	(United States) Taylor Fritz	7–6^{(7–4)}, 2–6, 6–2
Loss	2015	US Open	Hard	(United States) Taylor Fritz	2–6, 7–6^{(7–4)}, 2–6

=== Doubles: 1 (runner-up) ===
Result	Year	Tournament	Surface	Partner	Opponents	Score
Loss	2015	French Open	Clay	(United States) William Blumberg	(Spain) Álvaro López San Martín (Spain) Jaume Munar	4–6, 2–6

== Career Grand Slam tournament statistics ==
=== Career Grand Slam tournament seedings ===
Year	Australian Open	French Open	Wimbledon	US Open
2015	did not play	did not play	did not play	qualifier
2016	did not play	did not qualify	did not qualify	did not qualify
2017	did not play	did not play	did not play	wild card
2018	did not qualify	did not play	did not play	did not play
2019	did not qualify	wild card	did not qualify	did not qualify
2020	unseeded	unseeded	tournament cancelled*	unseeded
2021	unseeded	unseeded	did not play	unseeded
2022	unseeded	30th	30th	29th
2023	unseeded	16th	16th	14th
2024	14th	14th	12th	14th
2025	12th	12th	13th	14th
2026	19th	24th	21st	

* Due to the COVID-19 pandemic, the 2020 Wimbledon Championships of the tournament was cancelled.

=== Best Grand Slam results details ===
Australian Open
2023 Australian Open (unseeded)
Round	Opponent	Rank	Score
1R	(Germany) Jan-Lennard Struff (Q)	167	6–1, 7–6^{(8–6)}, 6–2
2R	(Spain) Alejandro Davidovich Fokina (30)	32	6–2, 2–6, 6–7^{(4–7)}, 6–3, 6–4
3R	(United States) Jenson Brooksby	39	6–1, 6–4, 6–3
4R	(Spain) Roberto Bautista Agut (24)	25	6–2, 4–6, 6–2, 7–5
QF	(United States) Ben Shelton	89	7–6^{(8–6)}, 6–3, 5–7, 6–4
SF	(Serbia) Novak Djokovic (4)	5	5–7, 1–6, 2–6

French Open
2025 French Open (12th seed)
Round	Opponent	Rank	Score
1R	(Denmark) Elmer Møller (LL)	112	6–7^{(5–7)}, 6–2, 6–3, 6–1
2R	(Hungary) Márton Fucsovics	124	4–6, 2–6, 6–3, 7–5, 6–4
3R	Karen Khachanov (24)	24	6–3, 3–6, 7–6^{(9–7)}, 3–6, 6–3
4R	(Australia) Alexei Popyrin (25)	25	6–3, 6–3, 6–3
QF	(Spain) Carlos Alcaraz (2)	2	0–6, 1–6, 4–6

Wimbledon Championships
2024 Wimbledon (12th seed)
Round	Opponent	Rank	Score
1R	(Spain) Pedro Martínez	49	6–2, 6–1, 4–6, 6–3
2R	(Finland) Otto Virtanen (Q)	147	4–6, 6–3, 5–7, 7–5, 6–4
3R	(Kazakhstan) Alexander Bublik (4)	23	6–3, 6–4, 6–2
4R	(Spain) Roberto Bautista Agut	112	6–2, 7–6^{(7–3)}, 6–2
QF	(Spain) Carlos Alcaraz (3)	3	7–5, 4–6, 2–6, 2–6

US Open
2023 US Open (14th seed)
Round	Opponent	Rank	Score
1R	(Italy) Stefano Travaglia (Q)	233	6–2, 6–3, 4–6, 6–1
2R	Roman Safiullin	60	3–6, 2–6, 6–2, 6–4, 6–3
3R	(Spain) Alejandro Davidovich Fokina (21)	21	6–1, 6–0, 3–6, 6–3
4R	(United States) Ben Shelton	47	4–6, 3–6, 6–4, 4–6
2024 US Open (14th seed)
Round	Opponent	Rank	Score
1R	(Italy) Lorenzo Sonego	48	6–4, 6–2, 5–7, 6–2
2R	(Australia) Max Purcell	97	7–5, 6–0, 1–0 ret.
3R	(Canada) Gabriel Diallo (Q)	143	6–7^{(5–7)}, 6–3, 6–1, 7–6^{(7–3)}
4R	(Italy) Jannik Sinner (1)	1	6–7^{(3–7)}, 6–7^{(5–7)}, 1–6

== Wins over top 10 players ==
- Paul has a 16–31 record against players who were, at the time the match was played, ranked in the top 10.

Season	2020	2021	2022	2023	2024	2025	2026	Total
Wins	1	1	4	2	4	1	3	16

#	Player	Rk	Event	Surface	Rd	Score	TPR	Ref
2020
1.	(Germany) Alexander Zverev	7	Mexican Open, Mexico	Hard	2R	6–3, 6–4	66	
2021
2.	(Russia) Andrey Rublev	5	Indian Wells Open, United States	Hard	3R	6–4, 3–6, 7–5	60	
2022
3.	(Italy) Matteo Berrettini	6	Mexican Open, Mexico	Hard	1R	4–6, 5–1 ret.	39	
4.	(Germany) Alexander Zverev	3	Indian Wells Open, United States	Hard	2R	6–2, 4–6, 7–6^{(7–2)}	39	
5.	(Spain) Carlos Alcaraz	4	Canadian Open, Canada	Hard	2R	6–7^{(4–7)}, 7–6^{(9–7)}, 6–3	34	
6.	(Spain) Rafael Nadal	2	Paris Masters, France	Hard (i)	2R	3–6, 7–6^{(7–4)}, 6–1	31	
2023
7.	(United States) Taylor Fritz	5	Mexican Open, Mexico	Hard	SF	6–3, 6–7^{(2–7)}, 7–6^{(7–2)}	23	
8.	(Spain) Carlos Alcaraz	1	Canadian Open, Canada	Hard	QF	6–3, 4–6, 6–3	14	
2024
9.	(Norway) Casper Ruud	9	Indian Wells Open, United States	Hard	QF	6–2, 1–6, 6–3	17	
10.	Daniil Medvedev	4	Italian Open, Italy	Clay	4R	6–1, 6–4	16	
11.	(Poland) Hubert Hurkacz	9	Italian Open, Italy	Clay	QF	7–5, 3–6, 6–3	16	
12.	(Bulgaria) Grigor Dimitrov	10	Stockholm Open, Sweden	Hard (i)	F	6–4, 6–3	13	
2025
13.	(Australia) Alex de Minaur	8	Italian Open, Italy	Clay	4R	7–5, 6–3	12	
2026
14.	(United States) Taylor Fritz	8	Delray Beach Open, United States	Hard	QF	6–4, 6–3	24	
15.	(Australia) Alex de Minaur	9	Hamburg Open, Germany	Clay	SF	2–6, 6–3, 6–3	26	
16.	(Germany) Alexander Zverev	3	Cincinnati Open, United States	Hard	4R	4–6, 7–6^{(8–6)}, 6–4	24	

- Key: (Rk) first use, opponent rank; (Rd) round; (Rk) 2nd use, player rank; (Ref) reference; (F) final; (SF) semifinal; (QF) quarterfinal; (#R) rounds 4, 3, 2, 1; (RR) round-robin stage; (Q#) qualifying rounds or stages (3), 2, 1.

* As of 20 August 2026.

== National and international representation ==
=== Team competitions finals: 1 (1 title) ===
Finals by tournaments Davis Cup (0–0) United Cup (0–0) Laver Cup (1–0)	Finals by teams United States (0–0) World (1–0)

Result	Date	W–L	Tournament	Surface	Team	Partners	Opponent team	Opponent players	Score
Win	Sep 2023	1–0	Laver Cup, Vancouver, Canada	Hard (i)	Team World	Taylor Fritz; Frances Tiafoe; Félix Auger-Aliassime; Ben Shelton; Francisco Cerúndolo	Team Europe	Andrey Rublev; Casper Ruud; Hubert Hurkacz; Alejandro Davidovich Fokina; Arthur Fils; Gaël Monfils	13–2
