= 2019 Oracle Challenger Series – New Haven – Men's doubles =

New Haven – Men's doubles
- 2019 Oracle Challenger Series – New Haven

Final
- Champions: (United States) Robert Galloway (United States) Nathaniel Lammons
- Runners-up: (Belgium) Sander Gillé (Belgium) Joran Vliegen
- Score: 7–5, 6–4

Events
| Singles | men | women |
| Doubles | men | women |
| Oracle Challenger Series – New Haven | · 2020 → |

This was the first edition of the tournament.

Robert Galloway and Nathaniel Lammons won the title after defeating Sander Gillé and Joran Vliegen 7–5, 6–4 in the final.

== Seeds ==
1. (Belgium) Sander Gillé / (Belgium) Joran Vliegen (final)
2. (Ukraine) Denys Molchanov / (New Zealand) Artem Sitak (first round)
3. (Mexico) Santiago González / (Sweden) Robert Lindstedt (first round)
4. (Germany) Tim Pütz / (Australia) John-Patrick Smith (first round)

== Draw ==
=== Key ===
- Q = Qualifier
- WC = Wild card
- LL = Lucky loser
- Alt = Alternate
- SE = Special exempt
- PR = Protected ranking
- ITF = ITF entry
- JE = Junior exempt
- w/o = Walkover
- r = Retired
- d = Defaulted
- SR = Special ranking

First round
1 | (Belgium) S Gillé (Belgium) J Vliegen | 6 | 7
(Venezuela) R Maytín (Mexico) MÁ Reyes-Varela | 4 | 5
WC | (United States) C Eubanks (Serbia) N Zimonjić | 6^{7} | 5
(Argentina) G Durán (Ecuador) R Quiroz | 7^{9} | 7
3 | (Mexico) S González (Sweden) R Lindstedt | 2 | 6^{3}
WC | (United States) M Giron (United States) D Novikov | 6 | 7^{7}
(United States) H Reese (Canada) B Schnur | 4 | 6 | [3]
(United States) N Monroe (Australia) M Reid | 6 | 1 | [10]
WC | (United States) J Bendeck (Slovenia) Sven Lah | 6 | 1 | [18]
PR | (United States) N Pasha (United States) M Schnur | 1 | 6 | [16]
(United States) R Galloway (United States) N Lammons | 7^{8} | 6
4 | (Germany) T Pütz (Australia) J-P Smith | 6^{6} | 3
(Mexico) H Hach Verdugo (United States) A Lawson | 4 | 4
(United States) T Paul (Canada) P Polansky | 6 | 6
(New Zealand) M Daniell (Philippines) T Huey | 6 | 6
2 | (Ukraine) D Molchanov (New Zealand) A Sitak | 3 | 2

Quarterfinals
1 | (Belgium) S Gillé (Belgium) J Vliegen | 6 | 6^{7} | [10]
(Argentina) G Durán (Ecuador) R Quiroz | 1 | 7^{9} | [6]
WC | (United States) M Giron (United States) D Novikov | 6^{5} | 6 | [7]
(United States) N Monroe (Australia) M Reid | 7^{7} | 4 | [10]
WC | (United States) J Bendeck (Slovenia) S Lah | 6 | 5 | [3]
(United States) R Galloway (United States) N Lammons | 4 | 7 | [10]
(United States) T Paul (Canada) P Polansky | 6 | 7^{7}
(New Zealand) M Daniell (Philippines) T Huey | 4 | 6^{4}

Semifinals
1 | (Belgium) S Gillé (Belgium) J Vliegen | 6 | 6
(United States) N Monroe (Australia) M Reid | 0 | 3
(United States) R Galloway (United States) N Lammons | 6 | 6
(United States) T Paul (Canada) P Polansky | 4 | 4

Final
1 | (Belgium) S Gillé (Belgium) J Vliegen | 5 | 4
(United States) R Galloway (United States) N Lammons | 7 | 6
