= 2024 Rolex Paris Masters – Doubles =

Doubles
- 2024 Rolex Paris Masters

Final
- Champions: (Netherlands) Wesley Koolhof (Croatia) Nikola Mektić
- Runners-up: (United Kingdom) Lloyd Glasspool (Czech Republic) Adam Pavlásek
- Score: 3–6, 6–3, [10–5]

Details
- Draw: 24
- Seeds: 8

Events
Singles	Doubles
← 2023 ·	Rolex Paris Masters	· 2025 →

Wesley Koolhof and Nikola Mektić defeated Lloyd Glasspool and Adam Pavlásek in the final, 3–6, 6–3, [10–5] to win the doubles tennis title at the 2024 Paris Masters.

Santiago González and Édouard Roger-Vasselin were the defending champions, but lost in the second round to Max Purcell and Jordan Thompson.

Marcel Granollers and Horacio Zeballos retained the ATP No. 1 doubles ranking after Marcelo Arévalo and Mate Pavić lost in the second round. Arévalo (for the first time) and Pavić will gain the top ranking once ATP Finals points drop. Arévalo became the first player, male or female, from El Salvador to be ranked world No. 1 in either singles or doubles.

== Seeds ==
All seeds received a bye into the second round.

1. (Spain) Marcel Granollers / (Argentina) Horacio Zeballos (second round)
2. (El Salvador) Marcelo Arévalo / (Croatia) Mate Pavić (second round)
3. (India) Rohan Bopanna / (Australia) Matthew Ebden (quarterfinals)
4. (Australia) Max Purcell / (Australia) Jordan Thompson (semifinals)
5. (Italy) Simone Bolelli / (Italy) Andrea Vavassori (second round)
6. (Netherlands) Wesley Koolhof / (Croatia) Nikola Mektić (champions)
7. (Germany) Kevin Krawietz / (Germany) Tim Pütz (withdrew)
8. (Finland) Harri Heliövaara / (United Kingdom) Henry Patten (quarterfinals)

== Draw ==
=== Key ===
- Q = Qualifier
- WC = Wild card
- LL = Lucky loser
- Alt = Alternate
- ITF = ITF entry
- PR = Protected ranking
- SR = Special ranking
- SE = Special exempt
- JE = Junior exempt
- JR = Junior Accelerator Programme entrant
- CO = College Accelerator Programme entrant
- NG = Next Gen Accelerator Program entrant
- w/o = Walkover
- r = Retired
- d = Defaulted

=== Finals ===
Semifinals
(United Kingdom) Neal Skupski (New Zealand) Michael Venus	2	4
6	(Netherlands) Wesley Koolhof (Croatia) Nikola Mektić	6	6
4	(Australia) Max Purcell (Australia) Jordan Thompson	3	4
Alt	(United Kingdom) Lloyd Glasspool (Czech Republic) Adam Pavlásek	6	6

Final
6	(Netherlands) Wesley Koolhof (Croatia) Nikola Mektić	3	6	[10]
Alt	(United Kingdom) Lloyd Glasspool (Czech Republic) Adam Pavlásek	6	3	[5]

=== Top half ===
First round
(Netherlands) J-J Rojer (United Kingdom) J Salisbury	1	0
(United Kingdom) N Skupski (New Zealand) M Venus	6	6
(Monaco) H Nys (Poland) J Zieliński	2	7^{7}	[10]
(United States) N Lammons (United States) J Withrow	6	6^{5}	[8]
(Brazil) M Melo (Germany) A Zverev	3	7^{7}	[10]
(United States) A Krajicek (United States) R Ram	6	6^{3}	[4]
Alt	(United Kingdom) J Murray (Australia) J Peers	5	6^{6}
WC	(France) A Fils (France) G Mpetshi Perricard	7	7^{8}

Second round
1	(Spain) M Granollers (Argentina) H Zeballos	4	6^{6}
(United Kingdom) N Skupski (New Zealand) M Venus	6	7^{8}
(Monaco) H Nys (Poland) J Zieliński	6	6^{2}	[5]
Alt	(Uruguay) A Behar (United States) R Galloway	4	7^{7}	[10]
3	(India) R Bopanna (Australia) M Ebden	6	7^{7}
(Brazil) M Melo (Germany) A Zverev	4	6^{5}
WC	(France) A Fils (France) G Mpetshi Perricard
6	(Netherlands) W Koolhof (Croatia) N Mektić	w/o

Quarterfinals
(United Kingdom) N Skupski (New Zealand) M Venus	6	6
Alt	(Uruguay) A Behar (United States) R Galloway	4	2
3	(India) R Bopanna (Australia) M Ebden	6^{13}	5
6	(Netherlands) W Koolhof (Croatia) N Mektić	7^{15}	7

Semifinals
(United Kingdom) N Skupski (New Zealand) M Venus	2	4
6	(Netherlands) W Koolhof (Croatia) N Mektić	6	6

=== Bottom half ===
First round
PR	(Croatia) M Čilić (Croatia) I Dodig	7	6
(Argentina) M González (Argentina) A Molteni	5	4
Alt	(Argentina) F Cerúndolo (Argentina) TM Etcheverry	2	7	[5]
(Mexico) S González (France) É Roger-Vasselin	6	5	[10]
(Belgium) S Gillé (Belgium) J Vliegen	6^{2}	4
Alt	(United Kingdom) L Glasspool (Czech Republic) A Pavlásek	7^{7}	6
WC	(France) S Doumbia (France) F Reboul	4	7^{7}	[10]
(United States) T Fritz (United States) B Shelton	6	6^{4}	[8]

Second round
8	(Finland) H Heliövaara (United Kingdom) H Patten	6	6^{5}	[10]
PR	(Croatia) M Čilić (Croatia) I Dodig	3	7^{7}	[8]
(Mexico) S González (France) É Roger-Vasselin	7^{8}	6^{5}	[8]
4	(Australia) M Purcell (Australia) J Thompson	6^{6}	7^{7}	[10]
5	(Italy) S Bolelli (Italy) A Vavassori	4	4
Alt	(United Kingdom) L Glasspool (Czech Republic) A Pavlásek	6	6
WC	(France) S Doumbia (France) F Reboul	7^{7}	7^{7}
2	(El Salvador) M Arévalo (Croatia) M Pavić	6^{5}	6^{3}

Quarterfinals
8	(Finland) H Heliövaara (United Kingdom) H Patten	7^{7}	1	[10]
4	(Australia) M Purcell (Australia) J Thompson	6^{3}	6	[12]
Alt	(United Kingdom) L Glasspool (Czech Republic) A Pavlásek	7^{7}	6
WC	(France) S Doumbia (France) F Reboul	6^{5}	4

Semifinals
4	(Australia) M Purcell (Australia) J Thompson	3	4
Alt	(United Kingdom) L Glasspool (Czech Republic) A Pavlásek	6	6
