= 2019 Oracle Challenger Series – New Haven – Women's singles =

New Haven – Women's singles
- 2019 Oracle Challenger Series – New Haven

Final
- Champion: (Russia) Anna Blinkova
- Runner-up: (United States) Usue Maitane Arconada
- Score: 6–4, 6–2

Events
Singles	men	women
Doubles	men	women
Oracle Challenger Series – New Haven	· 2020 →

This was the first edition of the tournament.

Anna Blinkova won the title, defeating Usue Maitane Arconada in the final, 6–4, 6–2.

== Seeds ==
All seeds received a bye into the second round.

1. (Russia) Margarita Gasparyan (second round, retired)
2. (United States) Jennifer Brady (quarterfinals)
3. (United States) Lauren Davis (semifinals)
4. (Germany) Tatjana Maria (second round)
5. (France) Pauline Parmentier (quarterfinals)
6. (Spain) Sara Sorribes Tormo (third round)
7. (Russia) Anna Blinkova (champion)
8. (Germany) Laura Siegemund (withdrew)

9. (Australia) Astra Sharma (quarterfinals)
10. (Spain) Aliona Bolsova (second round)
11. (United Kingdom) Heather Watson (semifinals)
12. (United States) Christina McHale (third round)
13. (Romania) Monica Niculescu (withdrew)
14. (United States) Whitney Osuigwe (second round)
15. (United States) Varvara Lepchenko (third round)
16. (United States) Francesca Di Lorenzo (second round)

Click on the seed number of a player to go to their draw section.

== Draw ==
=== Key ===
- Q = Qualifier
- WC = Wild card
- LL = Lucky loser
- Alt = Alternate
- ITF = ITF entry
- PR = Protected ranking
- SR = Special ranking
- SE = Special exempt
- JE = Junior exempt
- JR = Junior Accelerator Programme entrant
- CO = College Accelerator Programme entrant
- NG = Next Gen Accelerator Program entrant
- w/o = Walkover
- r = Retired
- d = Defaulted

=== Finals ===
Quarterfinals
(United States) Danielle Lao	6^{4}	4
11	(United Kingdom) Heather Watson	7^{7}	6
(United States) Usue Maitane Arconada	6	6
9	(Australia) Astra Sharma	4	4
5	(France) Pauline Parmentier	3	4
3/WC	(United States) Lauren Davis	6	6
7	(Russia) Anna Blinkova	6	6
2	(United States) Jennifer Brady	2	1

Semifinals
11	(United Kingdom) Heather Watson	3	7	0
(United States) Usue Maitane Arconada	6	5	6
3/WC	(United States) Lauren Davis	2	2
7	(Russia) Anna Blinkova	6	6

Final
(United States) Usue Maitane Arconada	4	2
7	(Russia) Anna Blinkova	6	6

=== Top half ===
==== Section 1 ====
First round
(Canada) K Sebov	6	4	2
(United States) D Lao	3	6	6
(United States) A Kiick	1	0
(Paraguay) V Cepede Royg	6	6
(Sweden) J Larsson	5	6	2
PR	(Germany) A-L Friedsam	7	3	6
(United States) J Loeb	2	6	6
WC	(United States) S Martinelli	6	4	1

Second round
1	(Russia) M Gasparyan	2^{r}
(United States) D Lao	4
(Paraguay) V Cepede Royg	7^{7}	6
16	(United States) F Di Lorenzo	6^{4}	3
11	(United Kingdom) H Watson	6	6
PR	(Germany) A-L Friedsam	4	3
(United States) J Loeb	1	3
6	(Spain) S Sorribes Tormo	6	6

Third round
(United States) D Lao	7^{7}	0	6
(Paraguay) V Cepede Royg	6^{3}	6	1
11	(United Kingdom) H Watson	6	4	6
6	(Spain) S Sorribes Tormo	3	6	4

Quarterfinals
(United States) D Lao	6^{4}	4
11	(United Kingdom) H Watson	7^{7}	6

==== Section 2 ====
First round
(United Kingdom) N Broady	3	1
(United States) UM Arconada	6	6
(Slovakia) J Čepelová	7	7^{7}
(United States) M Sanchez	5	6^{2}
(United States) E Halbauer	0	6	2
(Australia) E Perez	6	2	6
WC	(United States) H Giavara	2	5
(Russia) V Flink	6	7

Second round
4	(Germany) T Maria	2	2
(United States) UM Arconada	6	6
(Slovakia) J Čepelová	6	6
Alt	(United States) R Small	0	0
9	(Australia) A Sharma	6	6
(Australia) E Perez	4	4
(Russia) V Flink	6	7^{7}
Alt	(Netherlands) R van der Hoek	2	6^{3}

Third round
(United States) UM Arconada	6	4
(Slovakia) J Čepelová	0	1^{r}
9	(Australia) A Sharma	7	6
(Russia) V Flink	5	1

Quarterfinals
(United States) UM Arconada	6	6
9	(Australia) A Sharma	4	4

=== Bottom half ===
==== Section 3 ====
First round
(United States) C Harrison	4	6	6
(Hungary) F Stollár	6	2	3
(Slovenia) D Jakupović	4	1
(United States) A Li	6	6
(Spain) L Arruabarrena	7^{7}	6
Q	(Japan) E Hozumi	6^{3}	0
PR	(United States) V Duval	3	1
(United States) S Chang	6	6

Second round
5	(France) P Parmentier	7	6
(United States) C Harrison	5	4
(United States) A Li	2	6	6
10	(Spain) A Bolsova	6	4	2
15	(United States) V Lepchenko	6	4	6
(Spain) L Arruabarrena	1	6	4
(United States) S Chang	2	6	3
3/WC	(United States) L Davis	6	1	6

Third round
5	(France) P Parmentier	6	4	7
(United States) A Li	4	6	5
15	(United States) V Lepchenko	6	0	4
3/WC	(United States) L Davis	4	6	6

Quarterfinals
5	(France) P Parmentier	3	4
3/WC	(United States) L Davis	6	6

==== Section 4 ====
First round
(Japan) M Hibi	6	7
(Australia) L Cabrera	4	5
Q	(Australia) J Fourlis	5	1
(Russia) V Savinykh	7	6
WC	(United States) J Elie	3	2
(United States) N Gibbs	6	6
(United States) Q Gleason	7	6
(Japan) M Kobori	5	4

Second round
7	(Russia) A Blinkova	5	6	6
(Japan) M Hibi	7	3	2
(Russia) V Savinykh	6^{4}	1
12	(United States) C McHale	7^{7}	6
14	(United States) W Osuigwe	1	3
(United States) N Gibbs	6	6
(United States) Q Gleason	2	5
2	(United States) J Brady	6	7

Third round
7	(Russia) A Blinkova	7^{7}	6
12	(United States) C McHale	6^{1}	2
(United States) N Gibbs	4	3
2	(United States) J Brady	6	6

Quarterfinals
7	(Russia) A Blinkova	6	6
2	(United States) J Brady	2	1

== Qualifying ==
=== Seeds ===
1. (Australia) Jaimee Fourlis (qualified)
2. (Japan) Eri Hozumi (qualified)

=== Qualifiers ===
1. (Australia) Jaimee Fourlis
2. (Japan) Eri Hozumi

=== Draw ===
==== First qualifier ====
Qualifying competition
1	(Australia) Jaimee Fourlis	6	6
WC	(United States) Caroline Dunleavy	4	3

==== Second qualifier ====
Qualifying competition
2	(Japan) Eri Hozumi	6	6
WC	(United States) Chelsea Kung	0	1
