= 2024 Rolex Paris Masters =

- Date: 28 October – 3 November
- Edition: 52nd
- Category: ATP Tour Masters 1000
- Draw: 56S / 24D
- Prize money: €5,950,575
- Surface: Hard (indoor)
- Location: Paris, France
- Venue: Accor Arena

Champions

Singles
- (Germany) Alexander Zverev

Doubles
- (Netherlands) Wesley Koolhof / (Croatia) Nikola Mektić
← 2023 ·	Paris Masters	· 2025 →

The 2024 Rolex Paris Masters was a professional men's tennis tournament currently played on indoor hard courts. It was the 52nd edition of this Masters 1000 event on the 2024 ATP Tour. It took place at the Accor Arena in Paris from 28 October to 3 November 2024. This was the final tournament to take place at the Accor Arena before it moved to La Défense Arena in 2025.

== Champions ==
=== Singles ===
- (Germany) Alexander Zverev def. (France) Ugo Humbert, 6–2, 6–2

=== Doubles ===
- (Netherlands) Wesley Koolhof / (Croatia) Nikola Mektić def. (United Kingdom) Lloyd Glasspool / (Czech Republic) Adam Pavlásek, 3–6, 6–3, [10–5]

== Points and prize money ==
=== Point distribution ===
Event	W	F	SF	QF	Round of 16	Round of 32	Round of 64	Q	Q2	Q1
Men's Singles	1,000	600	360	180	90	45	10	25	16	0
Men's Doubles	1,000	600	360	180	90	0	—	—	—	—

=== Prize money ===
Event	W	F	SF	QF	Round of 16	Round of 32	Round of 64	Q2	Q1
Men's Singles	€919,075	€501,880	€274,425	€149,685	€80,065	€42,935	€23,785	€12,185	€6,380
Men's Doubles*	€310,900	€162,490	€85,870	€47,580	€26,110	€14,500	—	—	—

_{*per team}

== Singles main-draw entrants ==
=== Seeds ===
The following are the seeded players. Seedings are based on ATP rankings as of 21 October 2024. Rankings and points before are as of 28 October 2024.

Seed	Rank	Player	Points before	Points defending	Points won	Points after	Status
1	1	(Italy) Jannik Sinner	11,420	90	0	11,330	Withdrew due to illness
2	2	(Spain) Carlos Alcaraz	7,120	10	100	7,210	Third round lost to (France) Ugo Humbert [15]
3	3	(Germany) Alexander Zverev	6,805	90	1,000	7,715	Champion, defeated (France) Ugo Humbert [15]
4	5	Daniil Medvedev	5,230	10	10	5,230	Second round lost to (Australia) Alexei Popyrin
5	6	(United States) Taylor Fritz	4,335	45	10	4,380	Second round lost to (United Kingdom) Jack Draper
6	7	Andrey Rublev	4,070	360	10	3,720	Second round lost to (Argentina) Francisco Cerúndolo
7	8	(Norway) Casper Ruud	3,855	10	10	3,855	Second round lost to (Australia) Jordan Thompson
8	9	(Bulgaria) Grigor Dimitrov	3,740	600	200	3,340	Quarterfinals lost to Karen Khachanov
9	10	(Australia) Alex de Minaur	3,725	180	200	3,745	Quarterfinals lost to (Denmark) Holger Rune [13]
10	11	(Greece) Stefanos Tsitsipas	3,325	360	200	3,165	Quarterfinals lost to (Germany) Alexander Zverev [3]
11	12	(United States) Tommy Paul	3,180	45	10	3,145	First round lost to (France) Adrian Mannarino [WC]
12	14	(Poland) Hubert Hurkacz	2,810	180	10	2,640	First round lost to (United States) Alex Michelsen
13	13	(Denmark) Holger Rune	3,005	180	400	3,225	Semifinals lost to (Germany) Alexander Zverev [3]
14	17	(United States) Frances Tiafoe	2,585	10	10	2,585	First round lost to (France) Giovanni Mpetshi Perricard [WC]
15	18	(France) Ugo Humbert	2,385	45	650	2,990	Runner-up, lost to (Germany) Alexander Zverev [3]
16	16	(Italy) Lorenzo Musetti	2,600	10	10	2,600	First round lost to (Germany) Jan-Lennard Struff

==== Withdrawn players ====
The following players would have been seeded, but withdrew before the tournament began.

Rank	Player	Points before	Points dropping	Points after	Withdrawal reason
4	(Serbia) Novak Djokovic	6,210	1,000	5,210	Schedule change

=== Other entrants ===
The following players received wildcards into the singles main draw:

- (France) Richard Gasquet
- (France) Adrian Mannarino
- (France) Giovanni Mpetshi Perricard
- (France) Arthur Rinderknech

The following player received entry using a protected ranking:

- ~~(Spain) Pablo Carreño Busta~~
- (Croatia) Marin Čilić

The following players received entry from the qualifying draw:

- ~~(Spain) Alejandro Davidovich Fokina~~
- (Italy) Fabio Fognini
- (United States) Marcos Giron
- (France) Quentin Halys
- (France) Corentin Moutet
- (China) Shang Juncheng
- (Italy) Lorenzo Sonego

The following players received entry as lucky losers:

- (Belgium) Zizou Bergs
- (Spain) Roberto Carballés Baena
- (France) Arthur Cazaux
- (Serbia) Miomir Kecmanović
- (Australia) Christopher O'Connell

=== Withdrawals ===
- (Canada) Félix Auger-Aliassime → replaced by (Spain) Roberto Carballés Baena
- (Spain) Pablo Carreño Busta → replaced by (Australia) Christopher O'Connell
- (Italy) Flavio Cobolli → replaced by (Belgium) Zizou Bergs
- (Spain) Alejandro Davidovich Fokina → replaced by (Serbia) Miomir Kecmanović
- (Serbia) Novak Djokovic → replaced by (United States) Alex Michelsen
- (United States) Sebastian Korda → replaced by (Italy) Matteo Berrettini
- (Italy) Jannik Sinner → replaced by (France) Arthur Cazaux

== Doubles main-draw entrants ==
=== Seeds ===
Country	Player	Country	Player	Rank^{1}	Seed
ESP	Marcel Granollers	ARG	Horacio Zeballos	2	1
ESA	Marcelo Arévalo	CRO	Mate Pavić	7	2
IND	Rohan Bopanna	AUS	Matthew Ebden	15	3
AUS	Max Purcell	AUS	Jordan Thompson	15	4
ITA	Simone Bolelli	ITA	Andrea Vavassori	15	5
NED	Wesley Koolhof	CRO	Nikola Mektić	28	6
~~GER~~	~~Kevin Krawietz~~	~~GER~~	~~Tim Pütz~~	~~32~~	~~7~~
FIN	Harri Heliövaara	GBR	Henry Patten	32	8

- Rankings are as of 21 October 2024.

=== Other entrants ===
The following pairs received wildcards into the doubles main draw:

- (France) Sadio Doumbia / (France) Fabien Reboul
- (France) Arthur Fils / (France) Giovanni Mpetshi Perricard

The following pairs received entry as alternates:

- (Uruguay) Ariel Behar / (United States) Robert Galloway
- (Argentina) Francisco Cerúndolo / (Argentina) Tomás Martín Etcheverry
- (United Kingdom) Lloyd Glasspool / (Czech Republic) Adam Pavlásek
- (United Kingdom) Jamie Murray / (Australia) John Peers

=== Withdrawals ===
- (Kazakhstan) Alexander Bublik / Karen Khachanov → replaced by (United Kingdom) Jamie Murray / (Australia) John Peers
- (Spain) Pablo Carreño Busta / (Spain) Pedro Martínez → replaced by (United Kingdom) Lloyd Glasspool / (Czech Republic) Adam Pavlásek
- (Germany) Kevin Krawietz / (Germany) Tim Pütz → replaced by (Uruguay) Ariel Behar / (United States) Robert Galloway
- (Czech Republic) Tomáš Macháč / (Norway) Casper Ruud → replaced by (Argentina) Francisco Cerúndolo / (Argentina) Tomás Martín Etcheverry
