= 2019 Oracle Challenger Series – New Haven – Women's doubles =

New Haven – Women's doubles
- 2019 Oracle Challenger Series – New Haven

Final
- Champions: (Russia) Anna Blinkova (Georgia (country)) Oksana Kalashnikova
- Runners-up: (United States) Usue Maitane Arconada (United States) Jamie Loeb
- Score: 6–2, 4–6, [10–4]

Events
Singles	men	women
Doubles	men	women
Oracle Challenger Series – New Haven	· 2020 →

This was the first edition of the tournament.

Anna Blinkova and Oksana Kalashnikova won the title, defeating Usue Maitane Arconada and Jamie Loeb in the final, 6–2, 4–6, [10–4].

== Seeds ==
1. (Japan) Eri Hozumi / (Japan) Makoto Ninomiya (quarterfinals)
2. (Russia) Anna Blinkova / (Georgia (country)) Oksana Kalashnikova (champions)
3. (Slovenia) Dalila Jakupović / (Australia) Jessica Moore (first round)
4. (United States) Maria Sanchez / (Australia) Astra Sharma (first round)

== Draw ==
=== Key ===
- Q = Qualifier
- WC = Wild card
- LL = Lucky loser
- Alt = Alternate
- ITF = ITF entry
- PR = Protected ranking
- SR = Special ranking
- SE = Special exempt
- JE = Junior exempt
- JR = Junior Accelerator Programme entrant
- CO = College Accelerator Programme entrant
- NG = Next Gen Accelerator Program entrant
- w/o = Walkover
- r = Retired
- d = Defaulted

=== Draw ===
First round
(United States) J Elie (United States) E Halbauer	3	0
(United States) UM Arconada (United States) J Loeb	6	6
3	(Slovenia) D Jakupović (Australia) J Moore	3	2
(United Kingdom) N Broady (Hungary) F Stollár	6	6
(United States) S Chang (United States) A Mueller	2	5
(United States) N Gibbs (United Kingdom) H Watson	6	7
(Montenegro) V Babić (Netherlands) R van der Hoek	2	3
(Russia) N Dzalamidze (Russia) V Savinykh	6	6
(United States) V Duval (United States) C Harrison	6	4	[13]
4	(United States) M Sanchez (Australia) A Sharma	4	6	[11]
(United States) C Kung (United States) S Martinelli	2	4
(United States) Q Gleason (Brazil) L Stefani	6	6
(Australia) L Cabrera (Australia) E Perez	6	2	[6]
2	(Russia) A Blinkova (Georgia (country)) O Kalashnikova	3	6	[10]

Quarterfinals
1	(Japan) E Hozumi (Japan) M Ninomiya	3	1
(United States) UM Arconada (United States) J Loeb	6	6
(United Kingdom) N Broady (Hungary) F Stollár	6	7^{7}
(United States) N Gibbs (United Kingdom) H Watson	4	6^{4}
(Russia) N Dzalamidze (Russia) V Savinykh	3	1
(United States) V Duval (United States) C Harrison	6	6
(United States) Q Gleason (Brazil) L Stefani	3	4
2	(Russia) A Blinkova (Georgia (country)) O Kalashnikova	6	6

Semifinals
(United States) UM Arconada (United States) J Loeb	6	5	[14]
(United Kingdom) N Broady (Hungary) F Stollár	3	7	[12]
(United States) V Duval (United States) C Harrison	3	5
2	(Russia) A Blinkova (Georgia (country)) O Kalashnikova	6	7

Final
(United States) UM Arconada (United States) J Loeb	2	6	[4]
2	(Russia) A Blinkova (Georgia (country)) O Kalashnikova	6	4	[10]
