= 2019 Oracle Challenger Series – New Haven =

- Date: September 2–8
- Edition: 1st
- Category: ATP Challenger Tour; WTA 125K series
- Draw: 48S / 16D
- Prize money: $162,480+H (ATP) $162,480 (WTA)
- Surface: Hard, outdoor
- Location: New Haven, United States

Champions

Men's singles
- (United States) Tommy Paul

Women's singles
- (Russia) Anna Blinkova

Men's doubles
- (United States) Robert Galloway / (United States) Nathaniel Lammons

Women's doubles
- (Russia) Anna Blinkova / (Georgia (country)) Oksana Kalashnikova
Oracle Challenger Series – New Haven	· 2020 →

The 2019 Oracle Challenger Series – New Haven was a professional tennis tournament played on outdoor hard courts. This tournament was part of the 2019 ATP Challenger Tour and the 2019 WTA 125K series. The first edition took place from September 2 to 8, 2019 at the Cullman-Heyman Tennis Center in New Haven, United States.

== Men's singles main-draw entrants ==
=== Seeds ===
Country	Player	Rank^{1}	Seed
ITA	Andreas Seppi	77	1
CAN	Brayden Schnur	92	2
BIH	Damir Džumhur	99	3
USA	Bradley Klahn	108	4
USA	Denis Kudla	111	5
USA	Tommy Paul	114	6
SUI	Henri Laaksonen	119	7
UZB	Denis Istomin	139	8
USA	Marcos Giron	151	9
FRA	Enzo Couacaud	169	10
ECU	Emilio Gómez	171	11
DEN	Mikael Torpegaard	173	12
USA	Mitchell Krueger	174	13
BAR	Darian King	179	14
USA	Christopher Eubanks	188	15
CAN	Peter Polansky	192	16

- ^{1} Rankings are as of 26 August 2019.

=== Other entrants ===
The following players received wildcards into the singles main draw:

- (Cyprus) Petros Chrysochos
- (United States) Aleksandar Kovacevic
- (United States) Dylan King
- (United States) John McNally
- (United States) Evan Zhu

The following player received entry into the singles main draw using a protected ranking:

- (United States) Raymond Sarmiento

The following players received entry into the singles main draw as alternates:

- (United States) Alafia Ayeni
- (United States) Ulises Blanch
- (Republic of Ireland) Simon Carr
- (United States) Strong Kirchheimer

The following players received entry from the qualifying draw:

- (United Kingdom) Liam Broady
- (United States) Felix Corwin

== Women's singles main-draw entrants ==
=== Seeds ===
Country	Player	Rank^{1}	Seed
RUS	Margarita Gasparyan	61	1
USA	Jennifer Brady	67	2
USA	Lauren Davis	73	3
GER	Tatjana Maria	79	4
FRA	Pauline Parmentier	81	5
ESP	Sara Sorribes Tormo	83	6
RUS	Anna Blinkova	84	7
~~GER~~	~~Laura Siegemund~~	~~90~~	~~8~~
AUS	Astra Sharma	94	9
ESP	Aliona Bolsova	100	10
GBR	Heather Watson	101	11
USA	Christina McHale	103	12
~~ROU~~	~~Monica Niculescu~~	~~105~~	~~13~~
USA	Whitney Osuigwe	109	14
USA	Varvara Lepchenko	118	15
USA	Francesca Di Lorenzo	125	16

- ^{1} Rankings are as of 26 August 2019.

=== Other entrants ===
The following players received wildcards into the singles main draw:

- (United States) Lauren Davis
- (United States) Jennifer Elie
- (United States) Haley Giavara
- (United States) Samantha Martinelli

The following players received entry into the singles main draw through protected rankings:

- (United States) Victoria Duval
- (Germany) Anna-Lena Friedsam

The following players received entry into the singles main draw as alternates:

- (United States) Rosalyn Small
- (Netherlands) Rosalie van der Hoek

The following players received entry from the qualifying draw:

- (Australia) Jaimee Fourlis
- (Japan) Eri Hozumi

=== Withdrawals ===
Before the tournament

- (United States) Kristie Ahn → replaced by (United States) Jamie Loeb
- (United States) Robin Anderson → replaced by (Russia) Valeria Savinykh
- (United States) Madison Brengle → replaced by (Japan) Mayo Hibi
- (Kazakhstan) Zarina Diyas → replaced by (Australia) Lizette Cabrera
- (Belgium) Kirsten Flipkens → replaced by (United States) Quinn Gleason
- (Italy) Giulia Gatto-Monticone → replaced by (Sweden) Johanna Larsson
- (Australia) Daria Gavrilova → replaced by (Japan) Momoko Kobori
- (Poland) Magda Linette → replaced by (United States) Victoria Duval
- (Brazil) Beatriz Haddad Maia → replaced by (Hungary) Fanny Stollár
- (Czech Republic) Barbora Krejčíková → replaced by (United States) Danielle Lao
- (United States) Caty McNally → replaced by (United States) Elizabeth Halbauer
- (Romania) Monica Niculescu → replaced by (United States) Rosalyn Small
- (United States) Jessica Pegula → replaced by (Canada) Katherine Sebov
- (Germany) Laura Siegemund → replaced by (Netherlands) Rosalie van der Hoek
- (Romania) Patricia Maria Țig → replaced by (United States) Ann Li
- (United States) Taylor Townsend → replaced by (United States) Catherine Harrison
- (United States) Sachia Vickery → replaced by (United States) Usue Maitane Arconada

== Women's doubles main-draw entrants ==
=== Seeds ===
Country	Player	Country	Player	Rank^{1}	Seed
JPN	Eri Hozumi	JPN	Makoto Ninomiya	122	1
RUS	Anna Blinkova	GEO	Oksana Kalashnikova	126	2
SLO	Dalila Jakupović	AUS	Jessica Moore	144	3
USA	Maria Sanchez	AUS	Astra Sharma	179	4

- Rankings are as of 26 August 2019

== Champions ==
=== Men's singles ===
- (United States) Tommy Paul def. (United States) Marcos Giron 6–3, 6–3.

=== Women's singles ===
- (Russia) Anna Blinkova def. (United States) Usue Maitane Arconada 6–4, 6–2

=== Men's doubles ===
- (United States) Robert Galloway / (United States) Nathaniel Lammons def. (Belgium) Sander Gillé / (Belgium) Joran Vliegen 7–5, 6–4.

=== Women's doubles ===
- (Russia) Anna Blinkova / (Georgia (country)) Oksana Kalashnikova def. (United States) Usue Maitane Arconada / (United States) Jamie Loeb 6–2, 4–6, [10–4]
