= 2019 Oracle Challenger Series – New Haven – Men's singles =

New Haven – Men's singles
- 2019 Oracle Challenger Series – New Haven

Final
- Champion: (United States) Tommy Paul
- Runner-up: (United States) Marcos Giron
- Score: 6–3, 6–3

Events
Singles	men	women
Doubles	men	women
- Oracle Challenger Series – New Haven

This was the first edition of the tournament.

Tommy Paul won the title after defeating Marcos Giron 6–3, 6–3 in the final.

== Seeds ==
All seeds receive a bye into the second round.

1. (Italy) Andreas Seppi (quarterfinals)
2. (Canada) Brayden Schnur (quarterfinals)
3. (Bosnia and Herzegovina) Damir Džumhur (semifinals)
4. (United States) Bradley Klahn (quarterfinals)
5. (United States) Denis Kudla (second round)
6. (United States) Tommy Paul (champion)
7. (Switzerland) Henri Laaksonen (third round)
8. (Uzbekistan) Denis Istomin (third round)
9. (United States) Marcos Giron (final)
10. (France) Enzo Couacaud (second round)
11. (Ecuador) Emilio Gómez (third round)
12. (Denmark) Mikael Torpegaard (second round)
13. (United States) Mitchell Krueger (second round)
14. (Barbados) Darian King (third round)
15. (United States) Christopher Eubanks (third round)
16. (Canada) Peter Polansky (third round)

== Draw ==
Key

- Q = Qualifier
- WC = Wild card
- LL = Lucky loser
- Alt = Alternate
- ITF = ITF entry
- PR = Protected ranking
- SR = Special ranking
- SE = Special exempt
- JE = Junior exempt
- JR = Junior Accelerator Programme entrant
- CO = College Accelerator Programme entrant
- NG = Next Gen Accelerator Program entrant
- w/o = Walkover
- r = Retired
- d = Defaulted

=== Finals ===
Quarterfinals
1	(Italy) Andreas Seppi	6^{4}	6^{4}
(United States) Noah Rubin	7^{7}	7^{7}
4	(United States) Bradley Klahn	4	4
6	(United States) Tommy Paul	6	6
(United States) Michael Mmoh	6	2	1
3	(Bosnia and Herzegovina) Damir Džumhur	3	6	6
9	(United States) Marcos Giron	6	6
2	(Canada) Brayden Schnur	3	2

Semifinals
(United States) Noah Rubin	0	6^{8}
6	(United States) Tommy Paul	6	7^{10}
3	(Bosnia and Herzegovina) Damir Džumhur	5	7	2
9	(United States) Marcos Giron	7	5	6

Final
6	(United States) Tommy Paul	6	6
9	(United States) Marcos Giron	3	3

=== Top half ===
==== Section 1 ====
First round
Q	(United States) Felix Corwin	3	6	4
(United States) Roy Smith	6	1	6
WC	(United States) E Zhu	6	7^{7}
(United States) Mi Redlicki	3	6^{5}
(Ecuador) R Quiroz	6^{3}	4
(United States) N Rubin	7^{7}	6
(Colombia) N Mejía	7^{7}	3	4
(Australia) J-P Smith	6^{4}	6	6

Second round
1	(Italy) A Seppi	7^{7}	6
(United States) R Smith	6^{3}	3
WC	(United States) E Zhu	4	3
16	(Canada) P Polansky	6	6
10	(France) E Couacaud	6	2	1
(United States) N Rubin	0	6	6
(Australia) J-P Smith	6^{3}	6^{1}
7	(Switzerland) H Laaksonen	7^{7}	7^{7}

Third round
1	(Italy) A Seppi	6^{7}	6	6
16	(Canada) P Polansky	7^{9}	1	3
(United States) N Rubin	6	6
7	(Switzerland) H Laaksonen	2	2

Quarterfinals
1	(Italy) A Seppi	6^{4}	6^{4}
(United States) N Rubin	7^{7}	7^{7}

==== Section 2 ====
First round
Alt	(United States) U Blanch	6	6
Alt	(United States) A Ayeni	3	2
Alt	(United States) S Kirchheimer	6	6
(United States) E Escobedo	4	4
(United States) S Bangoura	6	6^{2}	6
(United States) A Sarkissian	3	7^{7}	3
(United States) T-S Kwiatkowski	7^{7}	6
(Northern Mariana Islands) C Sinclair	6^{5}	2

Second round
4	(United States) B Klahn	7^{9}	5	7^{8}
Alt	(United States) U Blanch	6^{7}	7	6^{6}
Alt	(United States) S Kirchheimer	6^{4}	4
15	(United States) C Eubanks	7^{7}	6
12	(Denmark) M Torpegaard	6^{10}	6	1
(United States) S Bangoura	7^{12}	4	6
(United States) T-S Kwiatkowski	6^{3}	4
6	(United States) T Paul	7^{7}	6

Third round
4	(United States) B Klahn	3	6	7^{7}
15	(United States) C Eubanks	6	3	6^{4}
(United States) S Bangoura	1	5
6	(United States) T Paul	6	7

Quarterfinals
4	(United States) B Klahn	4	4
6	(United States) T Paul	6	6

=== Bottom half ===
==== Section 3 ====
First round
Q	(United Kingdom) L Broady	1	6^{2}
(United States) M Mmoh	6	7^{7}
(United States) A Ritschard	4	6^{3}
(Colombia) DE Galán	6	7^{7}
WC	(United States) A Kovacevic	4	4
(United States) R Shane	6	6
WC	(United States) Dylan King	2	2
WC	(Cyprus) P Chrysochos	6	6

Second round
5	(United States) D Kudla	5	0
(United States) M Mmoh	7	6
(Colombia) DE Galán	3	0
11	(Ecuador) E Gómez	6	6
13	(United States) M Krueger	3	4
(United States) R Shane	6	6
WC	(Cyprus) P Chrysochos	3	2
3	(Bosnia and Herzegovina) D Džumhur	6	6

Third round
(United States) M Mmoh	6	0	6
11	(Ecuador) E Gómez	3	6	4
(United States) R Shane
3	(Bosnia and Herzegovina) D Džumhur	w/o

Quarterfinals
(United States) M Mmoh	6	2	1
3	(Bosnia and Herzegovina) D Džumhur	3	6	6

==== Section 4 ====
First round
(United States) D Young	6	6
(Canada) F Peliwo	3	4
WC	(United States) J McNally	3	7^{7}	6
PR	(United States) R Sarmiento	6	6^{5}	4
(United States) Ma Redlicki	4	4
(El Salvador) M Arévalo	6	6
Alt	(Republic of Ireland) S Carr	2	3
(United States) JC Aragone	6	6

Second round
8	(Uzbekistan) D Istomin	6	6
(United States) D Young	4	3
WC	(United States) J McNally	6^{6}	6^{5}
9	(United States) M Giron	7^{8}	7^{7}
14	(Barbados) D King	6	3	6
(El Salvador) M Arévalo	4	6	2
(United States) JC Aragone	5	2
2	(Canada) B Schnur	7	6

Third round
8	(Uzbekistan) D Istomin	6	6^{1}	3
9	(United States) M Giron	2	7^{7}	6
14	(Barbados) D King	6	3	4
2	(Canada) B Schnur	2	6	6

Quarterfinals
9	(United States) M Giron	6	6
2	(Canada) B Schnur	3	2
