= 2025 Rolex Paris Masters – Singles =

Singles
- 2025 Rolex Paris Masters

Final
- Champion: (Italy) Jannik Sinner
- Runner-up: (Canada) Félix Auger-Aliassime
- Score: 6–4, 7–6^{(7–4)}

Details
- Draw: 56 (7 Q / 4 WC )
- Seeds: 16

Events
Singles	Doubles
- Rolex Paris Masters

Jannik Sinner defeated Félix Auger-Aliassime in the final, 6–4, 7–6^{(7–4)} to win the singles tennis title at the 2025 Paris Masters. It was his fifth ATP Masters 1000 title and 23rd ATP Tour title overall. Sinner did not lose a set en route to the title, and dropped only 29 games, the fewest since the event switched to hardcourts in 2007. Sinner regained the world No. 1 singles ranking by winning the title; Carlos Alcaraz was also in contention at the beginning of the tournament.

Alexander Zverev was the defending champion, but lost in the semifinals to Sinner.

== Seeds ==
The top eight seeds received a bye into the second round.

1. (Spain) Carlos Alcaraz (second round)
2. (Italy) Jannik Sinner (champion)
3. (Germany) Alexander Zverev (semifinals)
4. (United States) Taylor Fritz (third round)
5. (United States) Ben Shelton (quarterfinals)
6. (Australia) Alex de Minaur (quarterfinals)
7. (Italy) Lorenzo Musetti (second round)
8. (Norway) Casper Ruud (second round)
9. (Canada) Félix Auger-Aliassime (final)
10. Karen Khachanov (third round)
11. Daniil Medvedev (quarterfinals)
12. Andrey Rublev (third round)
13. (Kazakhstan) Alexander Bublik (semifinals)
14. (Czech Republic) Jiří Lehečka (first round)
15. (Spain) Alejandro Davidovich Fokina (third round)
16. (Czech Republic) Jakub Menšík (withdrew)
17. (Argentina) Francisco Cerúndolo (third round)

Click on the seed number of a player to go to their draw section.

== Draw ==
Key

- Q = Qualifier
- WC = Wild card
- LL = Lucky loser
- Alt = Alternate
- ITF = ITF entry
- PR = Protected ranking
- SR = Special ranking
- SE = Special exempt
- JE = Junior exempt
- JR = Junior Accelerator Programme entrant
- CO = College Accelerator Programme entrant
- NG = Next Gen Accelerator Program entrant
- w/o = Walkover
- r = Retired
- d = Defaulted

=== Finals ===
Quarterfinals
WC	(Monaco) Valentin Vacherot	2	2
9	(Canada) Félix Auger-Aliassime	6	6
13	(Kazakhstan) Alexander Bublik	6^{5}	6	7
6	(Australia) Alex de Minaur	7^{7}	4	5
11	Daniil Medvedev	6	3	6^{5}
3	(Germany) Alexander Zverev	2	6	7^{7}
5	(United States) Ben Shelton	3	3
2	(Italy) Jannik Sinner	6	6

Semifinals
9	(Canada) Félix Auger-Aliassime	7^{7}	6
13	(Kazakhstan) Alexander Bublik	6^{3}	4
3	(Germany) Alexander Zverev	0	1
2	(Italy) Jannik Sinner	6	6

Final
9	(Canada) Félix Auger-Aliassime	4	6^{4}
2	(Italy) Jannik Sinner	6	7^{7}

=== Top half ===
==== Section 1 ====
First round
(United Kingdom) C Norrie	6	6
(Argentina) S Báez	3	4
(Hungary) F Marozsán	6^{5}	6^{4}
WC	(France) A Rinderknech	7^{7}	7^{7}
WC	(Monaco) V Vacherot	6	6
14	(Czech Republic) J Lehečka	1	3
9	(Canada) F Auger-Aliassime	6^{2}	6	6
Q	(Argentina) F Comesaña	7^{7}	3	3
(France) A Müller	6	7
(United States) B Nakashima	2	5
(Germany) D Altmaier	6	7^{7}
(United States) M Giron	2	6^{5}

Second round
1	(Spain) C Alcaraz	6	3	4
(United Kingdom) C Norrie	4	6	6
WC	(France) A Rinderknech	7^{11}	3	4
WC	(Monaco) V Vacherot	6^{9}	6	6
9	(Canada) F Auger-Aliassime	5	7^{7}	7^{7}
(France) A Müller	7	6^{5}	6^{4}
(Germany) D Altmaier	6	7
8	(Norway) C Ruud	3	5

Third round
(United Kingdom) C Norrie	6^{4}	4
WC	(Monaco) V Vacherot	7^{7}	6
9	(Canada) F Auger-Aliassime	3	6	6
(Germany) D Altmaier	6	3	2

Quarterfinals
WC	(Monaco) V Vacherot	2	2
9	(Canada) F Auger-Aliassime	6	6

==== Section 2 ====
First round
Q	(Australia) A Vukic	6	2	6
WC	(France) T Atmane	4	6	4
(France) C Moutet	3	7	6
LL	(United States) R Opelka	6	5	1
(Australia) A Popyrin	4	3
13	(Kazakhstan) A Bublik	6	6
10	K Khachanov	6	6
Q	(United States) E Quinn	1	1
(Canada) D Shapovalov	7	4	3
(Brazil) J Fonseca	5	6	6
(Netherlands) T Griekspoor	3	4
(Canada) G Diallo	6	6

Second round
4	(United States) T Fritz	7^{7}	6
Q	(Australia) A Vukic	6^{4}	2
(France) C Moutet	3	5
13	(Kazakhstan) A Bublik	6	7
10	K Khachanov	6	3	6
(Brazil) J Fonseca	1	6	3
(Canada) G Diallo	6^{8}	6	3
6	(Australia) A de Minaur	7^{10}	4	6

Third round
4	(United States) T Fritz	6^{5}	2
13	(Kazakhstan) A Bublik	7^{7}	6
10	K Khachanov	2	2
6	(Australia) A de Minaur	6	6

Quarterfinals
13	(Kazakhstan) A Bublik	6^{5}	6	7
6	(Australia) A de Minaur	7^{7}	4	5

=== Bottom half ===
==== Section 3 ====
First round
(Italy) L Sonego	6	6
Q	(United States) S Korda	2	3
(France) G Mpetshi Perricard	6^{5}	1
(Bulgaria) G Dimitrov	7^{7}	6
(Spain) J Munar	1	3
11	D Medvedev	6	6
15	(Spain) A Davidovich Fokina	4	6	6
LL	(France) V Royer	6	1	4
(Italy) L Darderi	6^{5}	6^{4}
WC	(France) A Cazaux	7^{7}	7^{7}
Q	(Argentina) TM Etcheverry	5	3
(Argentina) C Ugo Carabelli	7	6

Second round
7	(Italy) L Musetti	6	3	1
(Italy) L Sonego	3	6	6
(Bulgaria) G Dimitrov
11	D Medvedev	w/o
15	(Spain) A Davidovich Fokina	7^{7}	6
WC	(France) A Cazaux	6^{5}	4
(Argentina) C Ugo Carabelli	7^{7}	1	5
3	(Germany) A Zverev	6^{5}	6	7

Third round
(Italy) L Sonego	6	6^{5}	4
11	D Medvedev	3	7^{7}	6
15	(Spain) A Davidovich Fokina	2	4
3	(Germany) A Zverev	6	6

Quarterfinals
11	D Medvedev	6	3	6^{5}
3	(Germany) A Zverev	2	6	7^{7}

==== Section 4 ====
First round
(Italy) F Cobolli	6	6
(Czech Republic) T Macháč	1	4
(United States) L Tien	6	7^{9}
(Portugal) N Borges	2	6^{7}
Q	(United Kingdom) J Fearnley	1	4
12	A Rublev	6	6
17	(Argentina) F Cerúndolo	6	6
Q	(Bosnia and Herzegovina) D Džumhur	3	3
LL	(United States) A Kovacevic	4	6	6^{2}
(Serbia) M Kecmanović	6	1	7^{7}
(United States) A Michelsen	3	6	2
(Belgium) Z Bergs	6	2	6

Second round
5	(United States) B Shelton	7^{7}	6
(Italy) F Cobolli	6^{4}	3
(United States) L Tien	4	4
12	A Rublev	6	6
17	(Argentina) F Cerúndolo	7	1	7^{7}
(Serbia) M Kecmanović	5	6	6^{4}
(Belgium) Z Bergs	4	2
2	(Italy) J Sinner	6	6

Third round
5	(United States) B Shelton	7^{8}	6
12	A Rublev	6^{6}	3
17	(Argentina) F Cerúndolo	5	1
2	(Italy) J Sinner	7	6

Quarterfinals
5	(United States) B Shelton	3	3
2	(Italy) J Sinner	6	6

== Qualifying ==
=== Seeds ===
1. (United States) Jenson Brooksby (first round)
2. (United States) Sebastian Korda (qualified)
3. (France) Adrian Mannarino (first round)
4. (Argentina) Tomás Martín Etcheverry (qualified)
5. (United States) Reilly Opelka (qualifying competition, withdrew, lucky loser)
6. (Bosnia and Herzegovina) Damir Džumhur (qualified)
7. (Argentina) Francisco Comesaña (qualified)
8. (United States) Aleksandar Kovacevic (qualifying competition, lucky loser)
9. (Serbia) Hamad Medjedovic (first round)
10. (France) Valentin Royer (qualifying competition, lucky loser)
11. (Poland) Kamil Majchrzak (first round)
12. (United States) Ethan Quinn (qualified)
13. (Italy) Matteo Arnaldi (first round)
14. (Australia) Adam Walton (first round)

=== Qualifiers ===
1. (United States) Ethan Quinn
2. (United States) Sebastian Korda
3. (United Kingdom) Jacob Fearnley
4. (Argentina) Tomás Martín Etcheverry
5. (Australia) Aleksandar Vukic
6. (Bosnia and Herzegovina) Damir Džumhur
7. (Argentina) Francisco Comesaña

=== Lucky losers ===
1. (United States) Reilly Opelka
2. (United States) Aleksandar Kovacevic
3. (France) Valentin Royer

=== Draw ===
==== First qualifier ====
First round
1	(United States) Jenson Brooksby	6	3	3
(Netherlands) Botic van de Zandschulp	4	6	6
WC	(France) Ugo Blanchet	2	3
12	(United States) Ethan Quinn	6	6

Qualifying competition
(Netherlands) Botic van de Zandschulp	3	6^{4}
12	(United States) Ethan Quinn	6	7^{7}

==== Second qualifier ====
First round
2	(United States) Sebastian Korda	6	7
(Czech Republic) Vít Kopřiva	2	5
WC	(France) Pierre-Hugues Herbert	5	3
10	(France) Valentin Royer	7	6

Qualifying competition
2	(United States) Sebastian Korda	6	5	6
10	(France) Valentin Royer	2	7	4

==== Third qualifier ====
First round
3	(France) Adrian Mannarino	3	2
Alt	(Germany) Yannick Hanfmann	6	6
(United Kingdom) Jacob Fearnley	7	6
13	(Italy) Matteo Arnaldi	5	2

Qualifying competition
Alt	(Germany) Yannick Hanfmann	4	2
(United Kingdom) Jacob Fearnley	6	6

==== Fourth qualifier ====
First round
4	(Argentina) Tomás Martín Etcheverry	6	6
(Spain) Pedro Martínez	2	4
(Netherlands) Jesper de Jong	4	7^{7}	7^{7}
11	(Poland) Kamil Majchrzak	6	6^{5}	6^{4}

Qualifying competition
4	(Argentina) Tomás Martín Etcheverry	6	6
(Netherlands) Jesper de Jong	2	3

==== Fifth qualifier ====
First round
5	(United States) Reilly Opelka	6	6
(Italy) Mattia Bellucci	3	4
(Australia) Aleksandar Vukic	3	6	6
14	(Australia) Adam Walton	6	2	4

Qualifying competition
5	(United States) Reilly Opelka
(Australia) Aleksandar Vukic	w/o

==== Sixth qualifier ====
First round
6	(Bosnia and Herzegovina) Damir Džumhur	4	6	6
(France) Quentin Halys	6	3	1
WC	(France) Kyrian Jacquet	6	5	6^{3}
8	(United States) Aleksander Kovacevic	3	7	7^{7}

Qualifying competition
6	(Bosnia and Herzegovina) Damir Džumhur	6^{2}	6	7^{9}
8	(United States) Aleksander Kovacevic	7^{7}	3	6^{7}

==== Seventh qualifier ====
First round
7	(Argentina) Francisco Comesaña	7	6
WC	(France) Luca Van Assche	5	1
(Belgium) David Goffin	7	7
9/Alt	(Serbia) Hamad Medjedovic	5	5

Qualifying competition
7	(Argentina) Francisco Comesaña	6	0
(Belgium) David Goffin	1	0^{r}
