= Anna Blinkova =

Russian tennis player (born 1998)

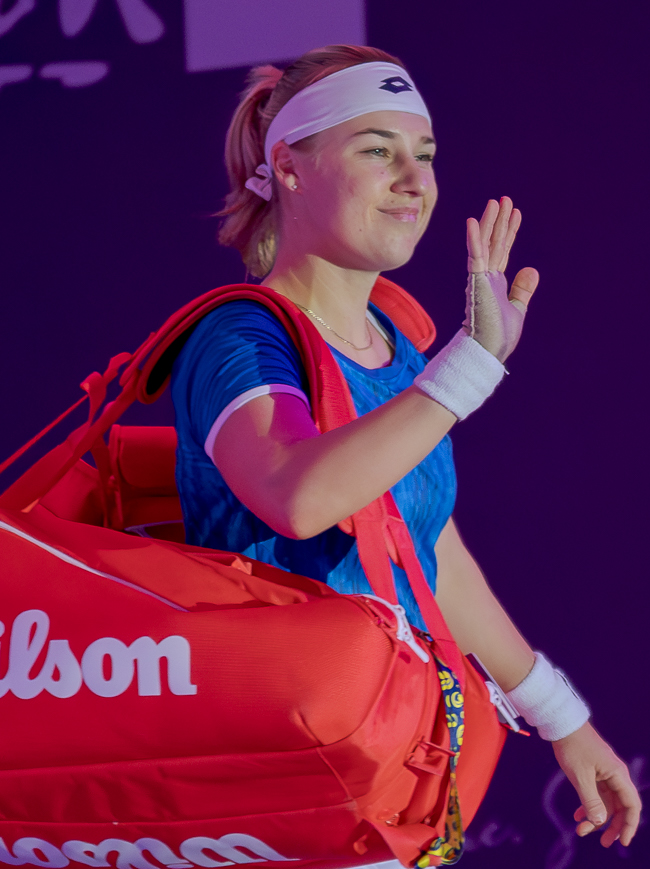
- Blinkova at the 2025 Transylvania Open
- Full name: Anna Vladimirovna Blinkova
- Native name: Анна Владимировна Блинкова
- Country (sports): Russia (2015–2026); France (Sep 2026–)
- Residence: Cannes, France
- Born: 10 September 1998 (age 28) Moscow, Russia
- Height: 1.79 m (5 ft 10 in)
- Turned pro: 2015
- Plays: Right-handed
- Coach: Gerard Solves, Xavier Pujo (2024–present), Ivo Klec (–2024)
- Prize money: US$ 5,465,842

Singles
- Career record: 350–279
- Career titles: 2
- Highest ranking: No. 34 (7 August 2023)
- Current ranking: No. 87 (21 September 2026)

Grand Slam singles results
- Australian Open: 3R (2024)
- French Open: 3R (2019, 2023)
- Wimbledon: 3R (2023)
- US Open: 2R (2025)

Doubles
- Career record: 137–116
- Career titles: 3
- Highest ranking: No. 45 (14 September 2020)
- Current ranking: No. 388 (14 September 2026)

Grand Slam doubles results
- Australian Open: 2R (2024, 2025, 2026)
- French Open: 2R (2024)
- Wimbledon: 3R (2019)
- US Open: SF (2020)

Team competitions
- Fed Cup: 2–1
- Last updated on: 17 September 2026.

Anna Vladimirovna Blinkova (Note: Russian: Анна Владимировна Блинкова, IPA: [ˈanːə blʲɪnˈkovə]) (born 10 September 1998) is a Russian-born French professional tennis player. She has been ranked as high as No. 34 by the WTA in singles on 7 August 2023, and No. 45 in doubles in September 2020. She won her first WTA Tour singles title at the 2022 Transylvania Open. In total, she has won two singles and three doubles titles on the WTA Tour.

Blinkova also has one singles and one doubles title each on WTA Challenger Tour, as well as four singles and eleven doubles titles on the ITF Circuit. She was runner-up at the 2015 Wimbledon Championships in girls' singles and had a best ITF combined junior ranking of No. 3 in August 2015.

== Early life and background ==
Anna Blinkova was born on 10 September 1998 in Moscow to parents Elena and Vladimir. Her mother accompanied her on the tennis circuit and occasionally served as her coach. As a teenager, Blinkova played both tennis and chess at a competitive level, before deciding to focus on tennis.

Blinkova speaks Russian, English, French, Slovak, Mandarin Chinese, Italian, Spanish, and Guarani.

== Career ==
=== Juniors ===
Blinkova is former junior world No. 3 player. She was runner-up at the 2015 Wimbledon Championships in girls' singles, where she lost to compatriot Sofya Zhuk.

=== 2015–17: First steps ===
Blinkova made her debut at the ITF Circuit at the 10k event in Kantaoui in February 2015. There, she won her first ITF doubles title. In January 2016, she won her first ITF singles title at a 10k event in Stuttgart. In April 2016, she turned pro and made her WTA Tour debut at the Morocco Open, where she was defeated in the first round. In October 2016, she won her first match on the WTA Tour, defeating Anastasija Sevastova in the first round of Kremlin Cup.

In January 2017, she made major debut at the Australian Open through qualifying, where she defeated Monica Niculescu in the first round, before losing to Karolína Plíšková in the second. At the 2017 Wimbledon and US Open, she also reached main draw, but then lost to Elena Vesnina in the first round of both competition. During the 2017 season, she won two 100k events on the ITF Circuit in doubles event, in Ilkley and St. Petersburg.

=== 2018–19: Major third round, top 100 in singles and doubles ===
In February 2018, she reached the third round of the Premier 5 Qatar Ladies Open, defeating Elena Vesnina and Kristina Mladenovic before she lost to world No. 7, Caroline Garcia. In May, she won her first WTA doubles title at the Morocco Open, partnering with Raluca Olaru. Blinkova entered top 100 for the first time in both singles and doubles in 2018.

On her debut at the 2019 French Open as a qualifier, she reached the third round with a win over compatriot Margarita Gasparyan and an upset over 24th seed Caroline Garcia, but then lost to 14th seed Madison Keys.

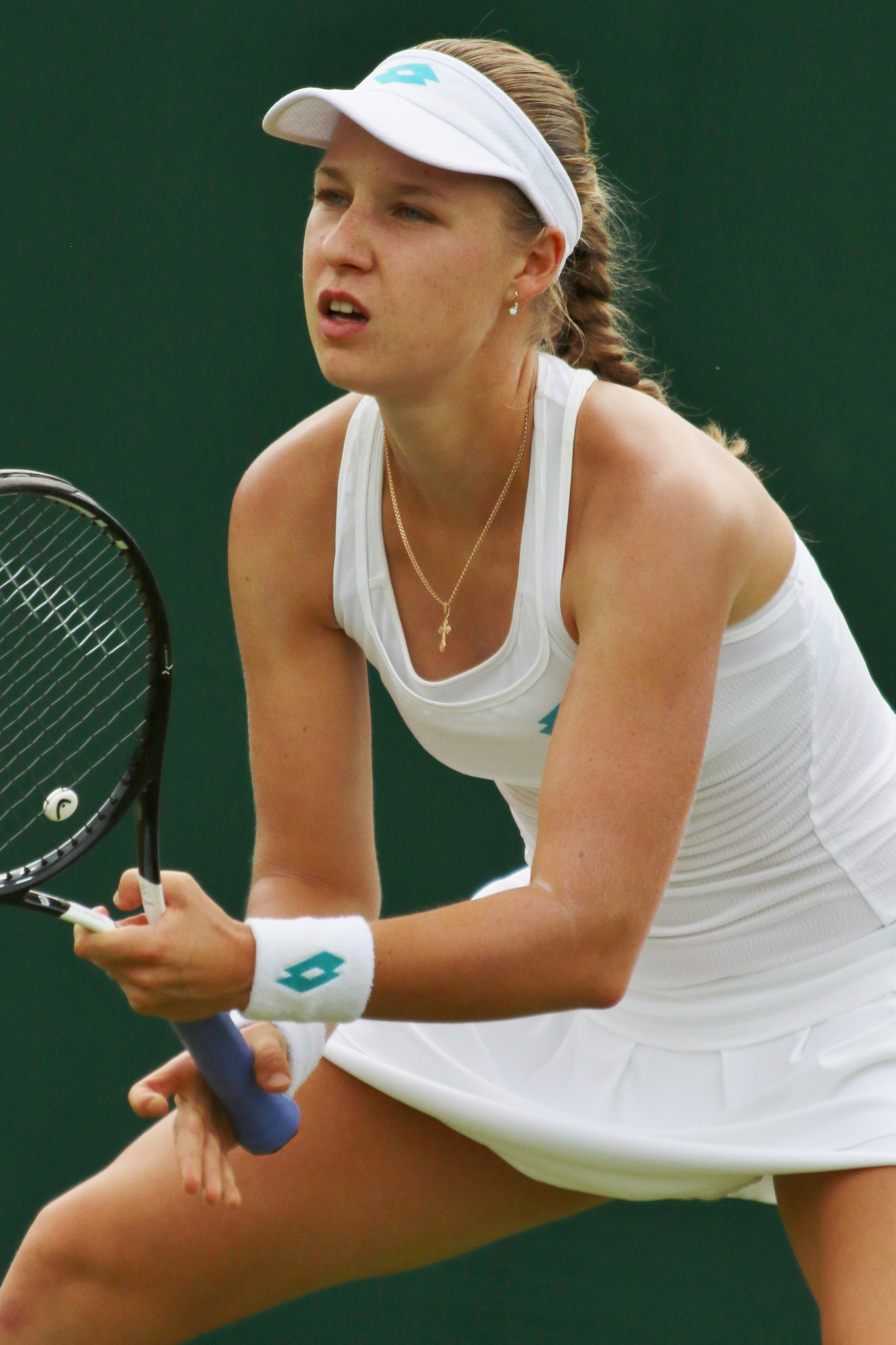
Blinkova at the 2019 Wimbledon Championships

In August 2019, she reached her first WTA Tour quarterfinal in singles at the Bronx Open, where she lost to Wang Qiang. At the 2019 US Open, she took defending champion and top seed Naomi Osaka to three sets. She followed this with title in New Haven on the WTA Challenger Tour. Nearly after that, she reached the semifinal of the Guangzhou Open, but then lost to Sofia Kenin. In October, she reached another semifinal at the Luxembourg Open but lost to later champion Jeļena Ostapenko. During the year, she did even better in doubles. In February 2019, she lost alongside Wang Yafan in the doubles final at the Hua Hin Championships. After that, she reached semifinals of the Hungarian Open. In April, she enetered another semifinal at the Premier-level Stuttgart Open. She then won 60k, 80k and 100k events, respectively, on the ITF Circuit. In September, she won the WTA Challenger New Haven.

=== 2020: Top 10 win, US Open doubles semifinals, top 75 ===
Blinkova continued to made better results in doubles than singles. Despite not producing good results in singles during the season, Blinkova started year with her first Top 10 win, defeating Belinda Bencic in the first round of the Shenzhen Open. In singles, her best result of the year came at the Italian Open, where she reached the third round, but then lost to world No. 4, Karolína Plíšková. In doubles, her first significant result came in March at the Indian Wells Challenger, where she reached the semifinal.

When tennis came back (after six month absence of the WTA Tour due to COVID-19 pandemic outbreak) in August, she first played at the Lexington Challenger, where she reached the semifinals in doubles alongside Vera Zvonareva. She followed this up with quarterfinals at the Cincinnati Open alongside Veronika Kudermetova. Things even went even better at the US Open where Blinkova and Kudermetova reached the semifinals but lost to eventual champions, Laura Siegemund and Vera Zvonareva. In singles, she had lost to eventual semifinalist Jennifer Brady in the first round.

Blinkova qualified for the main draw at the Italian Open and defeated Aliona Bolsova in a final-set tiebreak to reach the third round.

=== 2021: Out of top 100 ===
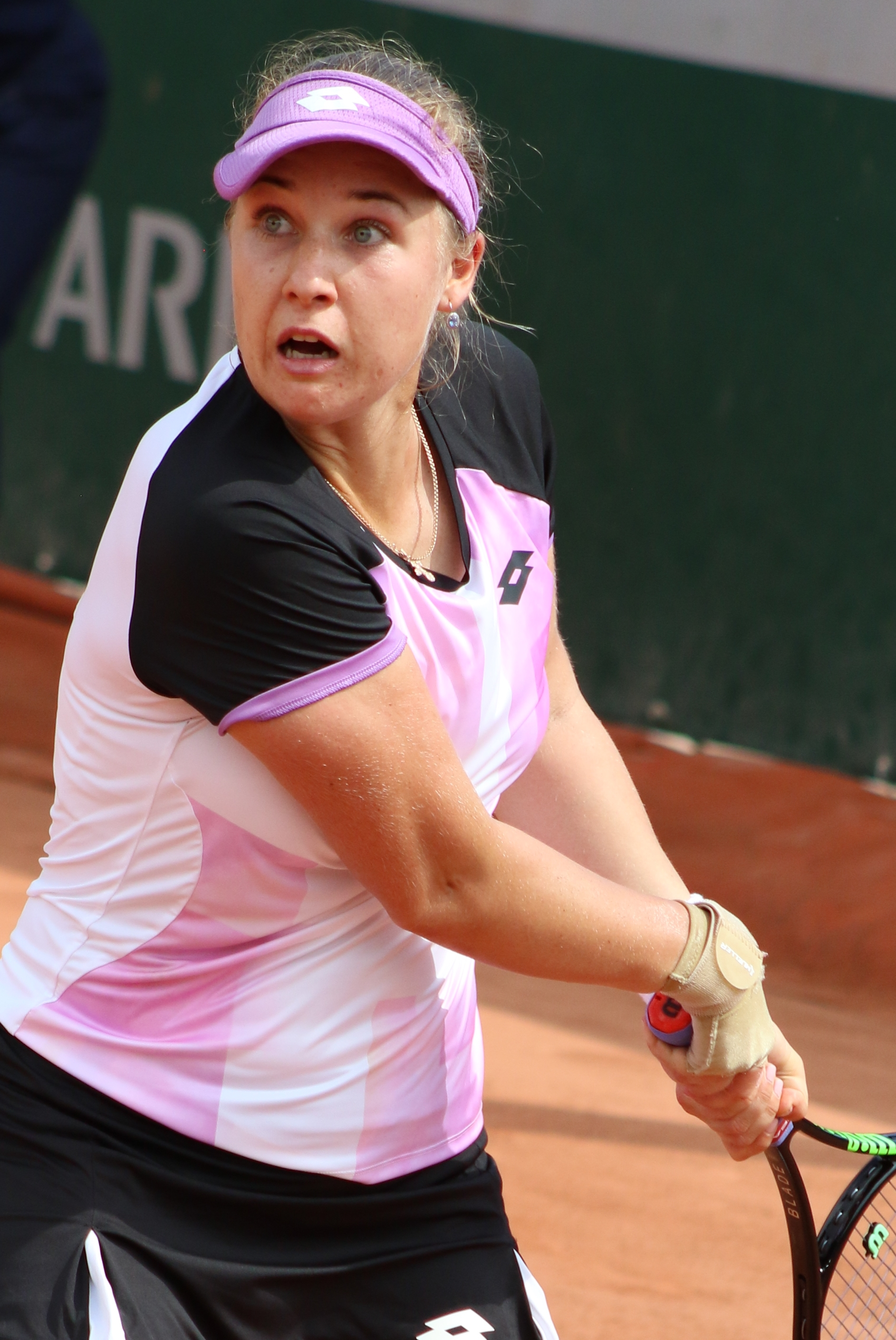
Blinkova at the 2021 French Open.

Blinkova started her year with consecutive losses at the Grampians Trophy and the Australian Open, before clinching her first win of the year over former top-ten player Andrea Petkovic in the first round of the Phillip Island Trophy. However, she managed to reach the doubles semifinals of the Gippsland Trophy with Veronika Kudermetova, but lost to Chan Hao-ching/Latisha Chan 9–11 in the match tiebreak. With compatriot Anastasia Potapova she reached her third tour doubles final at the Phillip Island Trophy, losing to Ankita Raina and Kamilla Rakhimova.

She reached her first semifinal of the year at the Bol Ladies Open, a WTA 125 event, as the top seed. However, she lost to Jasmine Paolini winning just four games.

At the Wimbledon Championships, Blinkova beat Tímea Babos in the first round before falling to world No. 1, Ashleigh Barty, on centre court.

Blinkova reached the doubles semifinals of the Cincinnati Open with Aliaksandra Sasnovich, defeating top seeds Hsieh Su-wei/Elise Mertens in the second round. She lost in the opening round of the US Open to Valentini Grammatikopoulou.

=== 2022: First WTA Tour title ===
Blinkova reached her first singles final since 2019 at the W60 Open Andrézieux-Bouthéon, defeating Océane Dodin for her first top-100 win since August 2021, before losing to Ana Bogdan in the final.

She followed it up with another W60 final at the Open de Grenoble, where she beat the top seed, Arantxa Rus, before losing to Katie Boulter.

As a qualifier, Blinkova won her first WTA Tour singles title at the Transylvania Open, defeating Jasmine Paolini in the final.

=== 2023: Top 5 win, French Open third round, top 35 ===
Blinkova defeated Ysaline Bonaventure and fifth seed Caroline Garcia, her first Top 5 win, to reach the third round of the French Open for the second time but lost to Elina Svitolina in three sets.

=== 2024: Longest tiebreak and third round at Australian Open, top-3 win ===
At the Australian Open, she defeated previous year runner-up Elena Rybakina in the longest tiebreak in a singles match at a major in the Open era, in the final set of their second-round match. Blinkova won the tiebreak 22–20 and saved six match points, before converting on her tenth match point to advance to the third round of this major for the first time. The 42-point match-tiebreak supplanted the 38-point tiebreaks played by Lesia Tsurenko and Ana Bogdan the previous summer at Wimbledon and by Jo-Wilfried Tsonga and Andy Roddick 20-18 at the 2007 Australian Open. She lost in the third round to 26th seed Jasmine Paolini.

In September, partnering with Mayar Sherif, Blinkova won the doubles at the Jasmin Open, defeating Alina Korneeva and Anastasia Zakharova in the final. The following month, she was runner-up in the singles at the WTA 125 Abierto Tampico in Mexico, losing to Marina Stakusic in the final.

=== 2025: Second career singles title ===
At the Linz Open, Blinkova defeated qualifier Sinja Kraus and second seed Elina Svitolina to reach the quarterfinals, where she lost to eighth seed Clara Tauson.

Partnering Yuan Yue, she won the doubles title at the ATX Open, defeating McCartney Kessler and Zhang Shuai in the final.

At the WTA 1000 Miami Open, Blinkova overcame Kamilla Rakhimova and 13th seed Diana Shnaider to reach the third round, where she lost to 23rd seed Marta Kostyuk.

In June, at the Eastbourne International, she defeated Marie Bouzková and Lulu Sun to make it through to the quarterfinals, where she lost to Maya Joint.

Blinkova reached her third WTA Tour final at the Jiangxi Open thanks to straight sets wins over qualifier Chloé Paquet, sixth seed Anna Bondár third seed Alycia Parks and Dominika Šalková. In the championship match, she defeated wildcard entrant Lilli Tagger, also in straight sets, to claim her second career singles title.

=== 2026: Nationality change, WTA Tour semifinal ===
She reached her first tour semifinal of the season at the 2026 SP Open, and first since winning 2025 Jiangxi Open, with wins over Vendula Valdmannova and eighth seed Alina Charaeva.

== Nationality representation change ==
Blinkova began representing France in mid-September 2026, having resided in the country for many years, since the age of 16. Anna Blinkova became the second French player in the WTA top 100, behind Diane Parry on 14 September 2026.

== Performance timelines ==
Key
W	F	SF	QF	#R	RR	Q#	P#	DNQ	A	Z#	PO	G	S	B	NMS	NTI	P	NH

(W) winner; (F) finalist; (SF) semifinalist; (QF) quarterfinalist; (#R) rounds 4, 3, 2, 1; (RR) round-robin stage; (Q#) qualification round; (P#) preliminary round; (DNQ) did not qualify; (A) absent; (Z#) Davis/Fed Cup Zonal Group (with number indication) or (PO) play-off; (G) gold, (S) silver or (B) bronze Olympic/Paralympic medal; (NMS) not a Masters tournament; (NTI) not a Tier I tournament; (P) postponed; (NH) not held; (SR) strike rate (events won / competed); (W–L) win–loss record.
To avoid confusion and double counting, these charts are updated at the conclusion of a tournament or when the player's participation has ended.

Only main-draw results in WTA Tour, Grand Slam tournaments, Billie Jean King Cup (Fed Cup), United Cup, Hopman Cup and Olympic Games are included in win–loss records.

=== Singles ===
Current through the 2025 US Open.

Tournament	2016	2017	2018	2019	2020	2021	2022	2023	2024	2025	SR	W–L	Win %
Grand Slam tournaments
Australian Open	A	2R	1R	1R	2R	1R	Q1	1R	3R	2R	0 / 8	5–8	38%
French Open	A	Q3	Q2	3R	1R	1R	Q1	3R	2R	1R	0 / 6	5–6	45%
Wimbledon	A	1R	2R	Q3	NH	2R	A (Note: Suspended due to the ban of Russian and Belarusian athletes in light of the Russian invasion of Ukraine.)	3R	1R	1R	0 / 6	4–6	40%
US Open	A	1R	1R	1R	1R	1R	Q2	1R	1R	2R	0 / 8	1–8	11%
Win–Loss	0–0	1–3	1–3	2–3	1–3	1–4	0–0	4–4	3–4	2–4	0 / 28	15–28	35%
National representation
Billie Jean King Cup	A	PO	A	A	W (Note: Edition is split into the two years due to COVID-19.)		DQ				1 / 1	0–1	0%
WTA 1000 tournaments
Qatar Open	A	NTI	3R	NTI	Q1	NTI	A	NTI	A	A	0 / 1	2–1	67%
Dubai Championships	NTI	A	NTI	A	NTI	A	NTI	A	A	A	0 / 0	0–0	–
Indian Wells Open	A	A	A	Q2	NH	A	A	2R	3R	1R	0 / 3	3–3	50%
Miami Open	A	A	A	Q1	NH	1R	A	2R	1R	3R	0 / 4	3–4	43%
Madrid Open	A	A	A	A	NH	A	A	1R	1R	2R	0 / 3	1–3	25%
Italian Open	A	A	A	A	3R	A	A	2R	2R	1R	0 / 4	4–4	50%
Canadian Open	A	A	A	A	NH	A	A	2R	1R	2R	0 / 3	2–3	40%
Cincinnati Open	A	A	Q1	A	Q1	Q2	A	1R	Q1	1R	0 / 2	0–2	0%
China Open	A	A	A	1R	NH			2R	1R	1R	0 / 4	1–4	20%
Wuhan Open	A	A	A	A	NH				A	Q2	0 / 0	0–0	–
Win–Loss	0–0	0–0	2–1	0–1	2–1	0–1	0–0	5–7	3–6	4–7	0 / 24	16–24	40%
Career statistics
	2016	2017	2018	2019	2020	2021	2022	2023	2024	2025	SR	W–L	Win %
Tournaments	2	7	13	14	8	17	7	24	25	11	Career total: 127		
Titles	0	0	0	0	0	0	1	0	0	0	Career total: 1		
Finals	0	0	0	0	0	0	1	1	0	0	Career total: 2		
Hard win–loss	1–0	2–5	4–10	11–13	3–5	1–11	6–4	13–16	8–14	10–8	1 / 87	58–86	41%
Clay win–loss	0–1	0–2	1–1	2–1	3–3	1–4	0–1	8–5	2–7	1–3	0 / 28	18–28	39%
Grass win–loss	0–0	0–1	1–2	0–0	0–0	2–2	1–1	5–3	2–4	0–0	0 / 13	11–13	46%
Overall win–loss	1–1	2–8	6–13	13–14	6–8	4–17	7–6	26–24	12–25	11–11	1 / 107	88–127	41%
Win %	50%	20%	32%	48%	43%	19%	54%	52%	32%	50%	Career total: 41%		
Year-end ranking (Note: 2015: WTA ranking–826.)	206	136	98	59	60	155	80	54	76	62	$2,966,822		

=== Doubles ===
Current through the 2023 Internationaux de Strasbourg.

Tournament	2017	2018	2019	2020	2021	2022	2023	SR	W–L	Win %
Grand Slam tournaments
Australian Open	A	A	A	1R	1R	1R	1R	0 / 4	0–4	0%
French Open	A	1R	A	1R	1R	1R	1R	0 / 5	0–5	0%
Wimbledon	A	1R	3R	NH	2R	A (Note: Suspended due to politics.)	1R	0 / 4	3–4	43%
US Open	A	A	1R	SF	A	A	1R	0 / 3	3–3	50%
Win–loss	0–0	0–2	2–2	3–3	1–3	0–2	0–4	0 / 16	6–16	27%
WTA 1000 tournaments
Qatar Open	NTI	A	NTI	2R	NTI	A	NTI	0 / 1	1–1	50%
Dubai Championships	A	NTI	A	NTI	A	NTI	A	0 / 0	0–0	–
Indian Wells Open	A	A	A	NH	A	A	A	0 / 0	0–0	–
Miami Open	A	A	A	NH	1R	A	A	0 / 1	0–1	0%
Madrid Open	A	A	A	NH	A	A	A	0 / 0	0–0	–
Italian Open	A	A	A	1R	A	A	A	0 / 1	0–1	0%
Canadian Open	A	A	A	NH	A	A	A	0 / 0	0–0	–
Cincinnati Open	A	A	A	QF	SF	A	1R	0 / 3	5–3	63%
China Open	A	A	1R	NH			A	0 / 1	0–1	0%
Wuhan Open	A	A	2R	NH				0 / 1	1–1	50%
Career statistics
Tournaments	5	12	12	7	15	6	3	Career total: 60		
Titles	0	1	0	0	0	0	0	Career total: 1		
Finals	0	1	1	0	1	1	0	Career total: 4		
Overall win–loss	2–5	8–11	12–12	9–7	16–14	6–6	0–3	1 / 60	53–58	48%
Year-end ranking	118	100	56	51	66	138	572			

== WTA Tour finals ==
=== Singles: 3 (2 titles, 1 runner-up) ===
Legend WTA 250 (2–1)	Finals by surface Hard (2–0) Clay (0–1)	Finals by setting Outdoor (1–1) Indoor (1–0)

Result	W–L	Date	Tournament	Tier	Surface	Opponent	Score
Win	1–0	Oct 2022	Transylvania Open, Romania	WTA 250	Hard (i)	(Italy) Jasmine Paolini	6–2, 3–6, 6–2
Loss	1–1	May 2023	Internationaux de Strasbourg, France	WTA 250	Clay	(Ukraine) Elina Svitolina	2–6, 3–6
Win	2–1	Oct 2025	Jiangxi Open, China	WTA 250	Hard	(Austria) Lilli Tagger	6–3, 6–3

=== Doubles: 6 (3 titles, 3 runner-ups) ===
Legend International / WTA 250 (3–3)	Finals by surface Hard (2–3) Clay (1–0)	Finals by setting Outdoor (3–3)

Result	W–L	Date	Tournament	Tier	Surface	Partner	Opponents	Score
Win	1–0	May 2018	Rabat Grand Prix, Morocco	International	Clay	(Romania) Raluca Olaru	(Spain) Georgina García Pérez (Hungary) Fanny Stollár	6–4, 6–4
Loss	1–1	Feb 2019	Hua Hin Championships, Thailand	International	Hard	(China) Wang Yafan	(Romania) Irina-Camelia Begu (Romania) Monica Niculescu	6–2, 1–6, [10–12]
Loss	1–2	Feb 2021	Phillip Island Trophy, Australia	WTA 250	Hard	(Russia) Anastasia Potapova	(India) Ankita Raina (Russia) Kamilla Rakhimova	6–2, 4–6, [7–10]
Loss	1–3	Sep 2022	Chennai Open, India	WTA 250	Hard	(Georgia (country)) Natela Dzalamidze	(Canada) Gabriela Dabrowski (Brazil) Luisa Stefani	1–6, 2–6
Win	2–3	Sep 2024	Jasmin Open, Tunisia	WTA 250	Hard	(Egypt) Mayar Sherif	Alina Korneeva; Anastasia Zakharova	2–6, 6–1, [10–8]
Win	3–3	Mar 2025	ATX Open, United States	WTA 250	Hard	(China) Yuan Yue	(United States) McCartney Kessler (China) Zhang Shuai	3–6, 6–1, [10–4]

== WTA 125 finals ==
=== Singles: 5 (1 title, 4 runner-ups) ===
Result	W–L	Date	Tournament	Surface	Opponent	Score
Win	1–0	Sep 2019	New Haven Challenger, United States	Hard	(United States) Usue Maitane Arconada	6–4, 6–2
Loss	1–1	May 2022	Open de Saint-Malo, France	Clay	(Brazil) Beatriz Haddad Maia	6–7^{(3–7)}, 3–6
Loss	1–2	Oct 2024	Abierto Tampico, Mexico	Hard	(Canada) Marina Stakusic	4–6, 6–2, 4–6
Loss	1–3	Sep 2026	Barranquilla Open, Colombia	Hard	(United States) Claire Liu	0–6, 6–2, 5–7
Loss	1–4	Nov 2026	Angola Ladies Open, Angola	Hard	Sofya Lansere	7–5, 1–6, 4–6

=== Doubles: 1 (title) ===
Result	Date	Tournament	Surface	Partner	Opponents	Score
Win	Sep 2019	New Haven Challenger, US	Hard	(Georgia (country)) Oksana Kalashnikova	(United States) Usue Maitane Arconada (United States) Jamie Loeb	6–2, 4–6, [10–4]

== ITF Circuit finals ==
=== Singles: 10 (4 titles, 6 runner-ups) ===
Legend W100 tournaments (1–1) W60 tournaments (1–2) W25 tournaments (1–3) W15 tournaments (1–0)	Finals by surface Hard (4–3) Clay (0–3)

Result	W–L	Date	Tournament	Tier	Surface	Opponent	Score
Win	1–0	Jan 2016	ITF Stuttgart, Germany	W15	Hard (i)	(Greece) Valentini Grammatikopoulou	7–6^{(4)}, 2–6, 6–2
Win	2–0	Aug 2016	ITF Westende, Belgium	W25	Hard	(Greece) Valentini Grammatikopoulou	7–5, 6–2
Loss	2–1	Sep 2016	ITF Almaty, Kazakhstan	W25	Clay	(Russia) Viktoria Kamenskaya	6–1, 3–6, 2–6
Loss	2–2	Feb 2017	Open de l'Isère, France	W25	Hard	(Czech Republic) Markéta Vondroušová	5–7, 4–6
Win	3–2	Mar 2018	Open de Seine-et-Marne, France	W60	Hard (i)	(Czech Republic) Karolína Muchová	w/o
Loss	3–3	May 2019	Empire Slovak Open, Slovakia	W100	Clay	(United States) Bernarda Pera	5–7, 5–7
Loss	3–4	Jan 2022	Open Andrézieux-Bouthéon, France	W60	Hard (i)	(Romania) Ana Bogdan	5–7, 3–6
Loss	3–5	Feb 2022	Open de Grenoble, France	W60	Hard (i)	(United Kingdom) Katie Boulter	6–7^{(2)}, 7–6^{(6)}, 2–6
Loss	3–6	Mar 2022	ITF Le Havre, France	W25	Clay (i)	(Germany) Tamara Korpatsch	6–3, 2–6, 2–6
Win	4–6	Oct 2024	Tennis Classic of Macon, US	W100	Hard	(United States) Ann Li	2–6, 6–2, 7–6^{(4)}

=== Doubles: 11 (11 titles) ===
Legend W100 tournaments (3–0) W80 tournaments (2–0) W50/60 tournaments (4–0) W10 tournaments (2–0)	Finals by surface Hard (7–0) Clay (3–0) Grass (1–0)

Result	W–L	Date	Tournament	Tier	Surface	Partner	Opponents	Score
Win	1–0	Feb 2015	ITF Port El Kantaoui, Tunisia	W10	Hard	(France) Tessah Andrianjafitrimo	(Spain) Arabela Fernández Rabener (Netherlands) Eva Wacanno	6–4, 6–0
Win	2–0	Jan 2016	ITF Stuttgart, Germany	W10	Hard (i)	(Russia) Maria Marfutina	(Germany) Laura Schaeder (Germany) Anna Zaja	0–6, 6–4, [10–8]
Win	3–0	Dec 2016	Ankara Cup, Turkey	W50	Hard (i)	(Belarus) Lidziya Marozava	(Uzbekistan) Sabina Sharipova (Russia) Ekaterina Yashina	4–6, 6–3, [11–9]
Win	4–0	Jun 2017	Ilkley Trophy, UK	W100	Grass	(Russia) Alla Kudryavtseva	(Poland) Paula Kania (Belgium) Maryna Zanevska	6–1, 6–4
Win	5–0	Sep 2017	Neva Cup St. Petersburg, Russia	W100	Hard (i)	(Russia) Veronika Kudermetova	(Switzerland) Belinda Bencic (Slovakia) Michaela Hončová	6–3, 6–1
Win	6–0	Mar 2018	Zhuhai Open, China	W60	Hard	(Netherlands) Lesley Kerkhove	(Japan) Nao Hibino (Montenegro) Danka Kovinić	7–5, 6–4
Win	7–0	Oct 2018	Internationaux de Poitiers, France	W80	Hard	(Russia) Alexandra Panova	(Switzerland) Viktorija Golubic (Netherlands) Arantxa Rus	6–1, 6–1
Win	8–0	May 2019	Wiesbaden Open, Germany	W60	Clay	(Belgium) Yanina Wickmayer	(Australia) Jaimee Fourlis (Liechtenstein) Kathinka von Deichmann	6–3, 4–6, [10–3]
Win	9–0	May 2019	Open de Cagnes-sur-Mer, France	W80	Clay	(Switzerland) Xenia Knoll	(Brazil) Beatriz Haddad Maia (Brazil) Luisa Stefani	4–6, 6–2, [14–12]
Win	10–0	May 2019	Empire Slovak Open, Slovakia	W100	Clay	(Switzerland) Xenia Knoll	(Czech Republic) Renata Voráčová (Sweden) Cornelia Lister	7–5, 7–5
Win	11–0	Aug 2022	Bronx Open, United States	W60	Hard	(Switzerland) Simona Waltert	(South Korea) Han Na-lae (Japan) Hiroko Kuwata	6–3, 6–3

== Junior Grand Slam tournament finals ==
=== Singles: 1 (runner–up) ===
Result	Year	Tournament	Surface	Opponent	Score
Loss	2015	Wimbledon	Grass	(Russia) Sofya Zhuk	5–7, 4–6

== Fed Cup participation ==
=== Singles: 1 (defeat) ===
Edition	Round	Date	Location	Against	Surface	Opponent	W/L	Result
2017	WG2	Feb 2017	Moscow (RUS)	Chinese Taipei	Hard (i)	Chang Kai-chen	L	3–6, 5–7

=== Doubles: 2 (2 victories) ===
Edition	Round	Date	Location	Against	Surface	Partner	Opponents	W/L	Result
2017	WG2	Feb 2017	Moscow (RUS)	Chinese Taipei	Hard (i)	Anna Kalinskaya	Chan Chin-wei; Hsu Ching-wen	W	6–3, 7–5
2020	F QR	Feb 2020	Cluj-Napoca (ROU)	Romania	Hard (i)	Anna Kalinskaya	Jaqueline Cristian; Elena-Gabriela Ruse	W	6–3, 6–2

== WTA Tour career earnings ==
correct as of 15 November 2021

Year	Grand Slam singles titles	WTA singles titles	Total singles titles	Earnings ($)	Money list rank
2016	0	0	0	31,013	309
2017	0	0	0	207,988	141
2018	0	0	0	334,191	113
2019	0	0	0	530,080	80
2020	0	0	0	373,335	57
2021	0	0	0	470,729	91
Career	0	0	0	1,968,604	265

== Wins against top 10 players ==
- Blinkova's match record against players who were, at the time the match was played, ranked in the top 10.

Season	2020	2023	2024	Total
Wins	1	1	3	5

No.	Player	Rk	Event	Surface	Rd	Score	Rk	Years	Ref
1.	(Switzerland) Belinda Bencic	8	Shenzhen Open, China	Hard	1R	3–6, 6–3, 6–3	58	2020	
2.	(France) Caroline Garcia	5	French Open, France	Clay	2R	4–6, 6–3, 7–5	56	2023	
3.	(Kazakhstan) Elena Rybakina	3	Australian Open, Australia	Hard	2R	6–4, 4–6, 7–6^{(22–20)}	57	2024	
4.	(United States) Jessica Pegula	5	Indian Wells Open, US	Hard	2R	6–2, 3–6, 6–3	45	2024	
5.	(United States) Emma Navarro	8	Hong Kong Open, Hong Kong (China SAR)	Hard	QF	6–4, 6–3	78	2024	

- Key: (Rk) first use, opponent rank; (Rd) round; (Rk) 2nd use, player rank; (Ref) reference; (F) final; (SF) semifinal; (QF) quarterfinal; (#R) rounds 4, 3, 2, 1; (RR) round-robin stage; (Q#) qualifying rounds or stages (3), 2, 1.
