= 2025 Rolex Paris Masters =

- Date: 27 October – 2 November
- Edition: 53rd
- Category: ATP Tour Masters 1000
- Draw: 56S / 24D
- Surface: Hard (indoor)
- Location: Nanterre, France
- Venue: La Défense Arena

Champions

Singles
- (Italy) Jannik Sinner

Doubles
- (Finland) Harri Heliövaara / (United Kingdom) Henry Patten
- Paris Masters

The 2025 Rolex Paris Masters was a professional men's tennis tournament played on indoor hard courts. It was the 53rd edition of this ATP 1000 event on the 2025 ATP Tour. It took place from 27 October to 2 November 2025 at a new venue, La Défense Arena in Nanterre (moved from the Accor Arena in previous editions).

== Champions ==
=== Singles ===
- (Italy) Jannik Sinner def. (Canada) Félix Auger-Aliassime, 6–4, 7–6^{(7–4)}

=== Doubles ===
- (Finland) Harri Heliövaara / (United Kingdom) Henry Patten def. (United Kingdom) Julian Cash / (United Kingdom) Lloyd Glasspool, 6–3, 6–4

== Points and prize money ==
=== Point distribution ===
| Event | W | F | SF | QF | Round of 16 | Round of 32 | Round of 64 | Q | Q2 | Q1 |
| Men's Singles | 1,000 | 600 | 360 | 180 | 90 | 45 | 10 | 25 | 16 | 0 |
| Men's Doubles | 1,000 | 600 | 360 | 180 | 90 | 0 | —N/a | —N/a | —N/a | —N/a |

=== Prize money ===
| Event | W | F | SF | QF | Round of 16 | Round of 32 | Round of 64 | Q2 | Q1 |
| Men's Singles | €946,610 | €516,925 | €282,650 | €154,170 | €82,465 | €44,220 | €24,500 | €12,550 | €6,570 |
| Men's Doubles* | €290,410 | €157,760 | €86,660 | €47,810 | €26,275 | €14,350 | —N/a | —N/a | —N/a |

_{*per team}

== Singles main-draw entrants ==
=== Seeds ===
The following are the seeded players. Seedings are based on ATP rankings as of 20 October 2025. Rankings and points before are as of 27 October 2025.

| Seed | Rank | Player | Points before | Points defending | Points won | Points after | Status |
|---|---|---|---|---|---|---|---|
| 1 | 1 | (Spain) Carlos Alcaraz | 11,340 | 100 | 10 | 11,250 | Second round lost to (United Kingdom) Cameron Norrie |
| 2 | 2 | (Italy) Jannik Sinner | 10,500 | 0 | 1,000 | 11,500 | Champion, defeated (Canada) Félix Auger-Aliassime [9] |
| 3 | 3 | (Germany) Alexander Zverev | 6,160 | 1,000 | 400 | 5,560 | Semifinals lost to (Italy) Jannik Sinner [2] |
| 4 | 4 | (United States) Taylor Fritz | 4,685 | (50)^{†} | 100 | 4,735 | Third round lost to (Kazakhstan) Alexander Bublik [13] |
| 5 | 7 | (United States) Ben Shelton | 3,820 | 50 | 200 | 3,970 | Quarterfinals lost to (Italy) Jannik Sinner [2] |
| 6 | 6 | (Australia) Alex de Minaur | 3,935 | 200 | 200 | 3,935 | Quarterfinals lost to (Kazakhstan) Alexander Bublik [13] |
| 7 | 8 | (Italy) Lorenzo Musetti | 3,685 | 10 | 10 | 3,685 | Second round lost to (Italy) Lorenzo Sonego |
| 8 | 9 | (Norway) Casper Ruud | 3,235 | 10 | 10 | 3,235 | Second round lost to (Germany) Daniel Altmaier |
| 9 | 10 | (Canada) Félix Auger-Aliassime | 3,195 | 0 | 650 | 3,845 | Runner-up, lost to (Italy) Jannik Sinner [2] |
| 10 | 14 | Karen Khachanov | 2,620 | 400 | 100 | 2,320 | Third round lost to (Australia) Alex de Minaur [6] |
| 11 | 13 | Daniil Medvedev | 2,810 | (50)^{†} | 200 | 2,960 | Quarterfinals lost to (Germany) Alexander Zverev [3] |
| 12 | 17 | Andrey Rublev | 2,470 | 10 | 100 | 2,560 | Third round lost to (United States) Ben Shelton [5] |
| 13 | 16 | (Kazakhstan) Alexander Bublik | 2,520 | 50 | 400 | 2,870 | Semifinals lost to (Canada) Félix Auger-Aliassime [9] |
| 14 | 18 | (Czech Republic) Jiří Lehečka | 2,415 | 10 | 10 | 2,415 | First round lost to (Monaco) Valentin Vacherot [WC] |
| 15 | 15 | (Spain) Alejandro Davidovich Fokina | 2,585 | (50)^{†} | 100 | 2,635 | Third round lost to (Germany) Alexander Zverev [3] |
| 16 | 19 | (Czech Republic) Jakub Menšík | 2,196 | 16 | 0 | 2,180 | Withdrew due to foot injury |
| 17 | 21 | (Argentina) Francisco Cerúndolo | 2,085 | 100 | 100 | 2,085 | Third round lost to (Italy) Jannik Sinner [2] |

† The player's 2024 points were replaced by a better result for purposes of his ranking as of 27 October 2025. Points for his 19th best result will be deducted instead.

==== Withdrawn players ====
The following players would have been seeded, but withdrew before the tournament began.

| Rank | Player | Points before | Points dropping | Points after | Withdrawal reason |
|---|---|---|---|---|---|
| 5 | (Serbia) Novak Djokovic | 4,580 | 0 | 4,580 | None given |
| 11 | (United Kingdom) Jack Draper | 3,090 | 100 | 2,990 | Left arm injury |
| 12 | (Denmark) Holger Rune | 2,990 | 400 | 2,590 | Left achilles injury |

=== Other entrants ===
The following players received wildcards into the singles main draw:

- (France) Térence Atmane
- (France) Arthur Cazaux
- (France) Arthur Rinderknech
- (Monaco) Valentin Vacherot

The following players received entry from the qualifying draw:

- (Argentina) Francisco Comesaña
- (Bosnia and Herzegovina) Damir Džumhur
- (Argentina) Tomás Martín Etcheverry
- (United Kingdom) Jacob Fearnley
- (United States) Sebastian Korda
- (United States) Ethan Quinn
- (Australia) Aleksandar Vukic

The following players received entry as lucky losers:

- (United States) Aleksandar Kovacevic
- (United States) Reilly Opelka
- (France) Valentin Royer

=== Withdrawals ===
- (Serbia) Novak Djokovic → replaced by (United States) Aleksandar Kovacevic
- (United Kingdom) Jack Draper → replaced by (Argentina) Camilo Ugo Carabelli
- (France) Arthur Fils → replaced by (Germany) Daniel Altmaier
- (France) Ugo Humbert → replaced by (France) Valentin Royer
- (Czech Republic) Jakub Menšík → replaced by (United States) Reilly Opelka
- (United States) Tommy Paul → replaced by (United States) Marcos Giron
- (Denmark) Holger Rune → replaced by (Serbia) Miomir Kecmanović
- (United States) Frances Tiafoe → replaced by (Italy) Lorenzo Sonego
- (Greece) Stefanos Tsitsipas → replaced by (Portugal) Nuno Borges

== Doubles main-draw entrants ==
=== Seeds ===
| Country | Player | Country | Player | Rank^{1} | Seed |
|---|---|---|---|---|---|
| ~~ESA~~ | ~~Marcelo Arévalo~~ | ~~CRO~~ | ~~Mate Pavić~~ | ~~4~~ | ~~1~~ |
| GBR | Julian Cash | GBR | Lloyd Glasspool | 5 | 2 |
| FIN | Harri Heliövaara | GBR | Henry Patten | 10 | 3 |
| ESP | Marcel Granollers | ARG | Horacio Zeballos | 15 | 4 |
| GER | Kevin Krawietz | GER | Tim Pütz | 21 | 5 |
| GBR | Joe Salisbury | GBR | Neal Skupski | 21 | 6 |
| ITA | Simone Bolelli | ITA | Andrea Vavassori | 29 | 7 |
| USA | Christian Harrison | USA | Evan King | 33 | 8 |

- Rankings are as of 20 October 2025.

=== Other entrants ===
The following pairs received wildcards into the doubles main draw:

- (France) Théo Arribagé / (France) Albano Olivetti
- (Bulgaria) Grigor Dimitrov / (France) Nicolas Mahut
- (France) Quentin Halys / (France) Pierre-Hugues Herbert

The following pairs received entry as alternates:

- (Spain) Íñigo Cervantes / (Israel) Daniel Cukierman
- (Brazil) Fernando Romboli / (Australia) John-Patrick Smith

=== Withdrawals ===
- (El Salvador) Marcelo Arévalo / (Croatia) Mate Pavić → replaced by (Spain) Íñigo Cervantes / (Israel) Daniel Cukierman
- (France) Giovanni Mpetshi Perricard / (France) Arthur Rinderknech → replaced by (Brazil) Fernando Romboli / (Australia) John-Patrick Smith
