= 2025 Rolex Paris Masters – Doubles =

Doubles
- 2025 Rolex Paris Masters

Final
- Champions: (Finland) Harri Heliövaara (United Kingdom) Henry Patten
- Runners-up: (United Kingdom) Julian Cash (United Kingdom) Lloyd Glasspool
- Score: 6–3, 6–4

Details
- Draw: 28
- Seeds: 8

Events
Singles	Doubles
- Rolex Paris Masters

Harri Heliövaara and Henry Patten defeated Julian Cash and Lloyd Glasspool in the final, 6–3, 6–4 to win the doubles tennis title at the 2025 Paris Masters. It was the first ATP Masters 1000 title for both players.

Wesley Koolhof and Nikola Mektić were the reigning champions, but Koolhof retired from professional tennis at the end of 2024. Mektić partnered Austin Krajicek, but lost in the second round to Kevin Krawietz and Tim Pütz.

This tournament marked the final professional appearance of former world No. 1 and five-time major doubles champion Nicolas Mahut. Partnering Grigor Dimitrov, the pair lost in the first round to Hugo Nys and Édouard Roger-Vasselin. It was also the final professional appearance of 2024 Australian Open champion and former world No. 1 Rohan Bopanna. Partnering Alexander Bublik, the pair lost in the first round to John Peers and JJ Tracy.

Glasspool retained the world No. 1 doubles ranking after Horacio Zeballos lost in the second round. The pair of Marcelo Arévalo and Mate Pavić were also in contention for the top spot, but withdrew before their first match.

== Seeds ==
The top four seeds received a bye into the second round.

1. (El Salvador) Marcelo Arévalo / (Croatia) Mate Pavić (withdrew)
2. (United Kingdom) Julian Cash / (United Kingdom) Lloyd Glasspool (final)
3. (Finland) Harri Heliövaara / (United Kingdom) Henry Patten (champions)
4. (Spain) Marcel Granollers / (Argentina) Horacio Zeballos (second round)
5. (Germany) Kevin Krawietz / (Germany) Tim Pütz (quarterfinals)
6. (United Kingdom) Joe Salisbury / (United Kingdom) Neal Skupski (second round)
7. (Italy) Simone Bolelli / (Italy) Andrea Vavassori (second round)
8. (United States) Christian Harrison / (United States) Evan King (first round)

== Draw ==
Key

- Q = Qualifier
- WC = Wild card
- LL = Lucky loser
- Alt = Alternate
- ITF = ITF entry
- PR = Protected ranking
- SR = Special ranking
- SE = Special exempt
- JE = Junior exempt
- JR = Junior Accelerator Programme entrant
- CO = College Accelerator Programme entrant
- NG = Next Gen Accelerator Program entrant
- w/o = Walkover
- r = Retired
- d = Defaulted

=== Finals ===
Semifinals
WC	(France) Quentin Halys (France) Pierre-Hugues Herbert	3	4
3	(Finland) Harri Heliövaara (United Kingdom) Henry Patten	6	6
(Portugal) Francisco Cabral (Austria) Lucas Miedler	4	7	[7]
2	(United Kingdom) Julian Cash (United Kingdom) Lloyd Glasspool	6	5	[10]

Final
3	(Finland) Harri Heliövaara (United Kingdom) Henry Patten	6	6
2	(United Kingdom) Julian Cash (United Kingdom) Lloyd Glasspool	3	4

=== Top half ===
First round
(France) S Doumbia (France) F Reboul	5	6^{5}
WC	(France) Q Halys (France) P-H Herbert	7	7^{7}
Alt	(Brazil) F Romboli (Australia) J-P Smith	5	7	[7]
(Argentina) M González (Argentina) A Molteni	7	5	[10]
(Argentina) F Cerúndolo (Italy) L Darderi	6	6
8	(United States) C Harrison (United States) E King	4	4
(Monaco) H Nys (France) É Roger-Vasselin	6	5	[10]
WC	(Bulgaria) G Dimitrov (France) N Mahut	4	7	[4]
(Argentina) G Andreozzi (France) M Guinard	3	1
(Austria) A Erler (United States) R Galloway	6	6
(Mexico) S González (Netherlands) D Pel	2	4
7	(Italy) S Bolelli (Italy) A Vavassori	6	6

Second round
Alt	(Spain) Í Cervantes (Israel) D Cukierman	6^{2}	3
WC	(France) Q Halys (France) P-H Herbert	7^{7}	6
(Argentina) M González (Argentina) A Molteni	6	5	[13]
(Argentina) F Cerúndolo (Italy) L Darderi	2	7	[11]
3	(Finland) H Heliövaara (United Kingdom) H Patten	6	6
(Monaco) H Nys (France) É Roger-Vasselin	1	4
(Austria) A Erler (United States) R Galloway	7^{7}	7
7	(Italy) S Bolelli (Italy) A Vavassori	6^{5}	5

Quarterfinals
WC	(France) Q Halys (France) P-H Herbert	6	6
(Argentina) M González (Argentina) A Molteni	4	3
3	(Finland) H Heliövaara (United Kingdom) H Patten	4	7^{7}	[10]
(Austria) A Erler (United States) R Galloway	6	6^{3}	[6]

Semifinals
WC	(France) Q Halys (France) P-H Herbert	3	4
3	(Finland) H Heliövaara (United Kingdom) H Patten	6	6

=== Bottom half ===
First round
6	(United Kingdom) J Salisbury (United Kingdom) N Skupski	7^{7}	4	[10]
WC	(France) T Arribagé (France) A Olivetti	6^{2}	6	[8]
(Australia) J Peers (United States) JJ Tracy	7	2	[10]
(India) R Bopanna (Kazakhstan) A Bublik	5	6	[8]
(Portugal) F Cabral (Austria) L Miedler	6	7^{10}
(Portugal) N Borges (Czech Republic) T Macháč	3	6^{8}
5	(Germany) K Krawietz (Germany) T Pütz	6	7^{7}
(Brazil) M Melo (Germany) A Zverev	1	6^{2}
(United States) A Krajicek (Croatia) N Mektić	6	6
(Netherlands) S Arends (United Kingdom) L Johnson	4	2
(India) Y Bhambri (Czech Republic) A Pavlásek	7^{7}	7^{7}
(Sweden) A Göransson (Poland) J Zieliński	6^{5}	6^{3}

Second round
6	(United Kingdom) J Salisbury (United Kingdom) N Skupski	7^{7}	1	[9]
(Australia) J Peers (United States) JJ Tracy	6^{4}	6	[11]
(Portugal) F Cabral (Austria) L Miedler	7	6
4	(Spain) M Granollers (Argentina) H Zeballos	5	3
5	(Germany) K Krawietz (Germany) T Pütz	4	7	[10]
(United States) A Krajicek (Croatia) N Mektić	6	5	[6]
(India) Y Bhambri (Czech Republic) A Pavlásek	4	7^{7}	[7]
2	(United Kingdom) J Cash (United Kingdom) L Glasspool	6	6^{5}	[10]

Quarterfinals
(Australia) J Peers (United States) JJ Tracy	6^{5}	4
(Portugal) F Cabral (Austria) L Miedler	7^{7}	6
5	(Germany) K Krawietz (Germany) T Pütz	4	5
2	(United Kingdom) J Cash (United Kingdom) L Glasspool	6	7

Semifinals
(Portugal) F Cabral (Austria) L Miedler	4	7	[7]
2	(United Kingdom) J Cash (United Kingdom) L Glasspool	6	5	[10]
