= 2024 Rolex Paris Masters – Singles =

Singles
- 2024 Rolex Paris Masters

Final
- Champion: (Germany) Alexander Zverev
- Runner-up: (France) Ugo Humbert
- Score: 6–2, 6–2

Details
- Draw: 56 (7 Q / 4 WC )
- Seeds: 16

Events
Singles	Doubles
- Rolex Paris Masters

Alexander Zverev defeated Ugo Humbert in the final, 6–2, 6–2 to win the singles tennis title at the 2024 Paris Masters. It was his seventh ATP Masters 1000 title and 23rd career ATP Tour title. Zverev was the first German to win the tournament since Boris Becker in 1992. Humbert was the first French player to reach the final since Jo-Wilfried Tsonga in 2011.

Novak Djokovic was the reigning champion, but withdrew before the start of the tournament.

== Seeds ==
The top eight seeds received a bye into the second round.

1. (Italy) Jannik Sinner (withdrew)
2. (Spain) Carlos Alcaraz (third round)
3. (Germany) Alexander Zverev (champion)
4. Daniil Medvedev (second round)
5. (United States) Taylor Fritz (second round)
6. Andrey Rublev (second round)
7. (Norway) Casper Ruud (second round)
8. (Bulgaria) Grigor Dimitrov (quarterfinals)
9. (Australia) Alex de Minaur (quarterfinals)
10. (Greece) Stefanos Tsitsipas (quarterfinals)
11. (United States) Tommy Paul (first round)
12. (Poland) Hubert Hurkacz (first round)
13. (Denmark) Holger Rune (semifinals)
14. (United States) Frances Tiafoe (first round)
15. (France) Ugo Humbert (final)
16. (Italy) Lorenzo Musetti (first round)

Click on the seed number of a player to go to their draw section.

== Draw ==
Key

- Q = Qualifier
- WC = Wild card
- LL = Lucky loser
- Alt = Alternate
- ITF = ITF entry
- PR = Protected ranking
- SR = Special ranking
- SE = Special exempt
- JE = Junior exempt
- JR = Junior Accelerator Programme entrant
- CO = College Accelerator Programme entrant
- NG = Next Gen Accelerator Program entrant
- w/o = Walkover
- r = Retired
- d = Defaulted

=== Finals ===
Quarterfinals
13	(Denmark) Holger Rune	6	4	7
9	(Australia) Alex de Minaur	4	6	5
3	(Germany) Alexander Zverev	7	6
10	(Greece) Stefanos Tsitsipas	5	4
8	(Bulgaria) Grigor Dimitrov	2	3
Karen Khachanov	6	6
(Australia) Jordan Thompson	2	6^{4}
15	(France) Ugo Humbert	6	7^{7}

Semifinals
13	(Denmark) Holger Rune	3	6^{4}
3	(Germany) Alexander Zverev	6	7^{7}
Karen Khachanov	7^{8}	4	3
15	(France) Ugo Humbert	6^{6}	6	6

Final
3	(Germany) Alexander Zverev	6	6
15	(France) Ugo Humbert	2	2

=== Top half ===
==== Section 1 ====
First round
(United States) B Shelton	6	6^{8}	6
Q	(France) C Moutet	3	7^{10}	3
Q	(Italy) F Fognini	5	5
(Kazakhstan) A Bublik	7	7
(Italy) M Arnaldi	4	4
13	(Denmark) H Rune	6	6
9	(Australia) A de Minaur	7	6
(Argentina) M Navone	5	1
(Argentina) S Báez	4	7^{8}	5
LL	(Serbia) M Kecmanović	6	6^{6}	7
(United Kingdom) J Draper	7	6
(Czech Republic) J Lehečka	5	2

Second round
LL	(France) A Cazaux	6	7^{7}
(United States) B Shelton	3	6^{4}
(Kazakhstan) A Bublik	4	2
13	(Denmark) H Rune	6	6
9	(Australia) A de Minaur	6	7^{7}
LL	(Serbia) M Kecmanović	4	6^{5}
(United Kingdom) J Draper	7^{8}	4	6
5	(United States) T Fritz	6^{6}	6	4

Third round
LL	(France) A Cazaux	6	3	4
13	(Denmark) H Rune	3	6	6
9	(Australia) A de Minaur	5	6	6
(United Kingdom) J Draper	7	2	3

Quarterfinals
13	(Denmark) H Rune	6	4	7
9	(Australia) A de Minaur	4	6	5

==== Section 2 ====
First round
(Italy) L Darderi	3	4
(Netherlands) T Griekspoor	6	6
(France) A Fils	7^{7}	6
PR	(Croatia) M Čilić	6^{5}	4
(Germany) J-L Struff	6	6
16	(Italy) L Musetti	4	2
10	(Greece) S Tsitsipas	4	6	6
LL	(Spain) R Carballés Baena	6	3	3
(Portugal) N Borges	6	6^{5}	3
(Chile) A Tabilo	3	7^{7}	6
Q	(France) Q Halys	6^{5}	3
(Argentina) F Cerúndolo	7^{7}	6

Second round
3	(Germany) A Zverev	7^{7}	6
(Netherlands) T Griekspoor	6^{2}	3
(France) A Fils	6	6
(Germany) J-L Struff	3	4
10	(Greece) S Tsitsipas	6	6
(Chile) A Tabilo	3	4
(Argentina) F Cerúndolo	7^{8}	7^{7}
6	A Rublev	6^{6}	6^{5}

Third round
3	(Germany) A Zverev	6	3	6
(France) A Fils	4	6	3
10	(Greece) S Tsitsipas	6^{1}	6	6
(Argentina) F Cerúndolo	7^{7}	4	2

Quarterfinals
3	(Germany) A Zverev	7	6
10	(Greece) S Tsitsipas	5	4

=== Bottom half ===
==== Section 3 ====
First round
(Argentina) TM Etcheverry	6	7^{8}
(China) Z Zhang	3	6^{6}
(Czech Republic) T Macháč	7^{7}	3^{r}
WC	(France) A Rinderknech	6^{3}	5
(United States) A Michelsen	6	6
12	(Poland) H Hurkacz	1	3
14	(United States) F Tiafoe	7^{7}	6^{4}	3
WC	(France) G Mpetshi Perricard	6^{5}	7^{7}	6
K Khachanov	6	3	7^{8}
LL	(Australia) C O'Connell	4	6	6^{6}
(Australia) A Popyrin	7	7^{7}
(Italy) M Berrettini	5	6^{2}

Second round
8	(Bulgaria) G Dimitrov	6^{9}	6	7
(Argentina) TM Etcheverry	7^{11}	3	5
WC	(France) A Rinderknech	7^{8}	7^{9}
(United States) A Michelsen	6^{6}	6^{7}
WC	(France) G Mpetshi Perricard	7^{14}	1	4
K Khachanov	6^{12}	6	6
(Australia) A Popyrin	6	2	7^{7}
4	D Medvedev	4	6	6^{4}

Third round
8	(Bulgaria) G Dimitrov	6	4	7^{7}
WC	(France) A Rinderknech	2	6	6^{5}
K Khachanov	7^{7}	6
(Australia) A Popyrin	6^{5}	4

Quarterfinals
8	(Bulgaria) G Dimitrov	2	3
K Khachanov	6	6

==== Section 4 ====
First round
(Australia) J Thompson	6	6
(Spain) P Martínez	4	4
LL	(Belgium) Z Bergs	6	6
WC	(France) R Gasquet	3	4
WC	(France) A Mannarino	6	7
11	(United States) T Paul	3	5
15	(France) U Humbert	6	4	6
(United States) B Nakashima	3	6	4
Q	(China) J Shang	6^{6}	6^{6}
Q	(United States) M Giron	7^{8}	7^{8}
(Chile) N Jarry	7^{7}	6
Q	(Italy) L Sonego	6^{4}	3

Second round
7	(Norway) C Ruud	6^{3}	6	4
(Australia) J Thompson	7^{7}	3	6
LL	(Belgium) Z Bergs	6	2	4
WC	(France) A Mannarino	3	6	6
15	(France) U Humbert	6	6
Q	(United States) M Giron	3	2
(Chile) N Jarry	5	1
2	(Spain) C Alcaraz	7	6

Third round
(Australia) J Thompson	7	7^{7}
WC	(France) A Mannarino	5	6^{5}
15	(France) U Humbert	6	3	7
2	(Spain) C Alcaraz	1	6	5

Quarterfinals
(Australia) J Thompson	2	6^{4}
15	(France) U Humbert	6	7^{7}

== Qualifying ==
=== Seeds ===
1. (Spain) Pedro Martínez (moved to main draw)
2. (China) Shang Juncheng (qualified)
3. (United States) Marcos Giron (qualified)
4. (Italy) Lorenzo Sonego (qualified)
5. (Czech Republic) Jakub Menšík (qualifying competition, retired)
6. (United Kingdom) Cameron Norrie (first round)
7. (Belgium) David Goffin (first round)
8. (Spain) Roberto Carballés Baena (qualifying competition, lucky loser)
9. (Hungary) Fábián Marozsán (first round)
10. (Serbia) Miomir Kecmanović (qualifying competition, lucky loser)
11. (Kazakhstan) Alexander Shevchenko (first round)
12. (Spain) Alejandro Davidovich Fokina (qualified, withdrew)
13. (Spain) Jaume Munar (first round, retired)
14. (Belgium) Zizou Bergs (qualifying competition, lucky loser)

=== Qualifiers ===
1. (Spain) Alejandro Davidovich Fokina (withdrew)
2. (China) Shang Juncheng
3. (United States) Marcos Giron
4. (Italy) Lorenzo Sonego
5. (France) Corentin Moutet
6. (France) Quentin Halys
7. (Italy) Fabio Fognini

=== Lucky losers ===
1. (Spain) Roberto Carballés Baena
2. (Serbia) Miomir Kecmanović
3. (Belgium) Zizou Bergs
4. (Australia) Christopher O'Connell
5. (France) Arthur Cazaux

=== Draw ===
==== First qualifier ====
First round
Alt	(India) Sumit Nagal	4	6^{3}
(Australia) Christopher O'Connell	6	7^{7}
(Argentina) Facundo Díaz Acosta	3	2
12	(Spain) Alejandro Davidovich Fokina	6	6

Qualifying competition
(Australia) Christopher O'Connell	3	6	3
12	(Spain) Alejandro Davidovich Fokina	6	4	6

==== Second qualifier ====
First round
2	(China) Shang Juncheng	6^{2}	7^{7}	6
(Australia) James Duckworth	7^{7}	6^{5}	4
WC	(France) Harold Mayot	6^{4}	4
14	(Belgium) Zizou Bergs	7^{7}	6

Qualifying competition
2	(China) Shang Juncheng	6	3	7^{7}
14	(Belgium) Zizou Bergs	4	6	6^{2}

==== Third qualifier ====
First round
3	(United States) Marcos Giron	6	6
WC	(France) Hugo Gaston	2	2
Pavel Kotov	4	3
10	(Serbia) Miomir Kecmanović	6	6

Qualifying competition
3	(United States) Marcos Giron	6^{10}	7^{7}	6
10	(Serbia) Miomir Kecmanović	7^{12}	6^{2}	3

==== Fourth qualifier ====
First round
4	(Italy) Lorenzo Sonego	6	5	7
(Netherlands) Botic van de Zandschulp	3	7	5
(France) Alexandre Müller	4	5
8	(Spain) Roberto Carballés Baena	6	7

Qualifying competition
4	(Italy) Lorenzo Sonego	6	7^{7}
8	(Spain) Roberto Carballés Baena	3	6^{4}

==== Fifth qualifier ====
First round
5	(Czech Republic) Jakub Menšík	7^{7}	1	6
(Serbia) Dušan Lajović	6^{4}	6	4
(France) Corentin Moutet	7	0
13	(Spain) Jaume Munar	5	0^{r}

Qualifying competition
5	(Czech Republic) Jakub Menšík	6^{3}	0^{r}
(France) Corentin Moutet	7^{7}	0

==== Sixth qualifier ====
First round
6	(United Kingdom) Cameron Norrie	3	4
WC	(France) Quentin Halys	6	6
(China) Bu Yunchaokete	6	7^{7}
11	(Kazakhstan) Alexander Shevchenko	4	6^{5}

Qualifying competition
WC	(France) Quentin Halys	3	7^{7}	6
(China) Bu Yunchaokete	6	6^{4}	3

==== Seventh qualifier ====
First round
7	(Belgium) David Goffin	1	7^{7}	1
WC	(France) Arthur Cazaux	6	6^{5}	6
Alt	(Italy) Fabio Fognini	6	6
9	(Hungary) Fábián Marozsán	3	4

Qualifying competition
WC	(France) Arthur Cazaux	6^{4}	6	2
Alt	(Italy) Fabio Fognini	7^{7}	4	6
