= Oracle Challenger Series – New Haven =

- 2019 Oracle Challenger Series – New Haven

Tournament information
- Event name: Oracle Challenger Series – New Haven
- Founded: 2019
- Location: New Haven, Connecticut, United States
- Venue: Yale Tennis Center
- Surface: Hard
- Website: ATP site

Current champions
- Men's singles: (United States) Tommy Paul
- Women's singles: (Russia) Anna Blinkova
- Men's doubles: (United States) Robert Galloway (United States) Nathaniel Lammons
- Women's doubles: (Russia) Anna Blinkova (Georgia (country)) Oksana Kalashnikova
ATP Tour
- Category: ATP Challenger Tour
- Draw: 48S / 4Q / 16D
- Prize money: $162,480+H
WTA Tour
- Category: WTA 125K series
- Draw: 48S / 4Q / 16D
- Prize money: $162,480

The Oracle Challenger Series – New Haven was a professional tennis tournament played on hard courts. It was part of the ATP Challenger Tour and the Women's Tennis Association (WTA) 125K series. It was held in New Haven, Connecticut, United States in 2019.

== Past finals ==
=== Men's singles ===
Year	Champion	Runner-up	Score
2020	Cancelled due to the COVID-19 pandemic		
2019	(United States) Tommy Paul	(United States) Marcos Giron	6–3, 6–3

=== Women's singles ===
Year	Champion	Runner-up	Score
2020	Cancelled due to the COVID-19 pandemic		
2019	(Russia) Anna Blinkova	(United States) Usue Maitane Arconada	6–4, 6–2

=== Men's doubles ===
Year	Champions	Runners-up	Score
2020	Cancelled due to the COVID-19 pandemic		
2019	(United States) Robert Galloway (United States) Nathaniel Lammons	(Belgium) Sander Gillé (Belgium) Joran Vliegen	7–5, 6–4

=== Women's doubles ===
Year	Champions	Runners-up	Score
2020	Cancelled due to the COVID-19 pandemic		
2019	(Russia) Anna Blinkova (Georgia (country)) Oksana Kalashnikova	(United States) Usue Maitane Arconada (United States) Jamie Loeb	6–2, 4–6, [10–4]
