= 2013 Charles Sturt Adelaide International =

- Date: 4–10 February
- Edition: 1st
- Draw: 32S / 16D
- Prize money: $50,000
- Surface: Hard
- Location: Adelaide, Australia

Champions

Singles
- (Australia) Matthew Barton

Doubles
- (Australia) Samuel Groth / (Australia) Matt Reid
Charles Sturt Adelaide International	· 2014 →

The 2013 Charles Sturt Adelaide International was a professional tennis tournament played on hard courts. It was the first edition of the tournament which was part of the 2013 ATP Challenger Tour. It took place in Adelaide, Australia between 4 and 10 February 2013.

== Singles main-draw entrants ==
=== Seeds ===
Country	Player	Rank^{1}	Seed
JPN	Yūichi Sugita	133	1
JPN	Hiroki Moriya	175	2
CAN	Peter Polansky	181	3
AUS	John Millman	183	4
AUS	Samuel Groth	196	5
AUS	Brydan Klein	217	6
AUS	James Duckworth	226	7
ITA	Alessandro Giannessi	238	8

- ^{1} Rankings are as of January 28, 2013.

=== Other entrants ===
The following players received wildcards into the singles main draw:

- (Australia) Alex Bolt
- (Australia) Chris Guccione
- (Australia) Nick Kyrgios
- (Australia) Dane Propoggia

The following players received entry as a special exempt into the singles main draw:

- (Australia) Matthew Barton

The following players received entry from the qualifying draw:

- (United States) Sean Berman
- (Australia) Colin Ebelthite
- (Slovakia) Ivo Klec
- (Australia) Michael Venus

== Doubles main-draw entrants ==
=== Seeds ===
Country	Player	Country	Player	Rank^{1}	Seed
AUS	Brydan Klein	AUS	Dane Propoggia	255	1
RSA	Ruan Roelofse	AUS	John-Patrick Smith	294	2
AUS	Adam Feeney	AUS	Chris Guccione	438	3
NZL	Artem Sitak	NZL	Jose Statham	463	4

- ^{1} Rankings are as of January 28, 2013.

=== Other entrants ===
The following pairs received wildcards into the doubles main draw:

- (Australia) Matthew Barton / (Australia) Michael Look
- (Australia) Nick Kyrgios / (Australia) Bradley Mousley
- (Australia) Luke Saville / (Australia) Jack Schipanski

== Champions ==
=== Singles ===
- (Australia) Matthew Barton def. (United Kingdom) James Ward, 6–2, 6–3

=== Doubles ===
- (Australia) Samuel Groth / (Australia) Matt Reid def. (Australia) James Duckworth / (Australia) Greg Jones, 6–2, 6–4
