= 2013 Charles Sturt Adelaide International – Doubles =

Doubles
- 2013 Charles Sturt Adelaide International

Final
- Champions: (Australia) Samuel Groth (Australia) Matt Reid
- Runners-up: (Australia) James Duckworth (Australia) Greg Jones
- Score: 6–2, 6–4

Events
Singles	Doubles
Charles Sturt Adelaide International	· 2014 →

Samuel Groth and Matt Reid won the first edition of the tournament 6–2, 6–4 against James Duckworth and Greg Jones.

== Seeds ==
1. (Australia) Brydan Klein / (Australia) Dane Propoggia (first round)
2. (South Africa) Ruan Roelofse / (Australia) John-Patrick Smith (first round)
3. (Australia) Adam Feeney / (Australia) Chris Guccione (first round)
4. (New Zealand) Artem Sitak / (New Zealand) Jose Statham (quarterfinals)

== Draw ==
=== Key ===
- Q = Qualifier
- WC = Wild card
- LL = Lucky loser
- Alt = Alternate
- SE = Special exempt
- PR = Protected ranking
- ITF = ITF entry
- JE = Junior exempt
- w/o = Walkover
- r = Retired
- d = Defaulted
- SR = Special ranking

=== Draw ===
First round
1	(Australia) B Klein (Australia) D Propoggia	3	4
(Japan) H Moriya (Japan) Y Sugita	6	6
(Australia) J Duckworth (Australia) G Jones	6	6
(Italy) A Arnaboldi (Italy) A Giannessi	3	4
4	(New Zealand) A Sitak (New Zealand) J Statham	6	6
WC	(Australia) M Barton (Australia) Michael Look	4	4
(Canada) P Polansky (New Zealand) M Venus	7	6
WC	(Australia) L Saville (Australia) Jack Schipanski	5	1
(Russia) Alexander Lobkov (United Kingdom) J Ward	4	6	[9]
(Australia) A Bolt (Australia) A Whittington	6	3	[11]
WC	(Australia) N Kyrgios (Australia) B Mousley	6	6
3	(Australia) A Feeney (Australia) C Guccione	4	2
(France) J Eysseric (France) S Robert	5	7	[11]
(Australia) C Ebelthite (New Zealand) D King-Turner	7	5	[9]
(Australia) S Groth (Australia) M Reid	6	6
2	(South Africa) R Roelofse (Australia) J-P Smith	1	2

Quarterfinals
(Japan) H Moriya (Japan) Y Sugita	4	4
(Australia) J Duckworth (Australia) G Jones	6	6
4	(New Zealand) A Sitak (New Zealand) J Statham	7^{8}	5	[6]
(Canada) P Polansky (New Zealand) M Venus	6^{6}	7	[10]
WC	(Australia) A Bolt (Australia) A Whittington	3	6^{2}
WC	(Australia) N Kyrgios (Australia) B Mousley	6	7^{7}
(France) J Eysseric (France) S Robert	2	1
(Australia) S Groth (Australia) M Reid	6	6

Semifinals
(Australia) J Duckworth (Australia) G Jones	6	6
(Canada) P Polansky (New Zealand) M Venus	3	2
WC	(Australia) N Kyrgios (Australia) B Mousley	4	3
(Australia) S Groth (Australia) M Reid	6	6

Final
(Australia) J Duckworth (Australia) G Jones	2	4
(Australia) S Groth (Australia) M Reid	6	6
