= 2013 Charles Sturt Adelaide International – Singles =

Singles
- 2013 Charles Sturt Adelaide International

Final
- Champion: (Australia) Matthew Barton
- Runner-up: (United Kingdom) James Ward
- Score: 6–2, 6–3

Events
| Singles | Doubles |
| Charles Sturt Adelaide International | · 2014 → |

Matthew Barton won the first edition of the event 6–2, 6–3 against James Ward.

== Seeds ==
1. (Japan) Yūichi Sugita (quarterfinals)
2. (Japan) Hiroki Moriya (first round)
3. (Canada) Peter Polansky (second round)
4. (Australia) John Millman (first round)
5. (Australia) Samuel Groth (quarterfinals)
6. (Australia) Brydan Klein (first round)
7. (Australia) James Duckworth (first round)
8. (Italy) Alessandro Giannessi (first round)

== Draw ==
=== Key ===
- Q = Qualifier
- WC = Wild card
- LL = Lucky loser
- Alt = Alternate
- SE = Special exempt
- PR = Protected ranking
- ITF = ITF entry
- JE = Junior exempt
- w/o = Walkover
- r = Retired
- d = Defaulted
- SR = Special ranking

=== Finals ===
Semifinals
(United Kingdom) James Ward | 6 | 5 | 6
WC | (Australia) Nick Kyrgios | 4 | 7 | 1
SE | (Australia) Matthew Barton | 6 | 7
(Russia) Aleksandr Lobkov | 1 | 5

Final
(United Kingdom) James Ward | 2 | 3
SE | (Australia) Matthew Barton | 6 | 6

=== Top half ===
First round
1 | (Japan) Y Sugita | 6 | 6
(France) J Eysseric | 2 | 3
(Australia) M Reid | 7^{7} | 6
WC | (Australia) A Bolt | 6^{1} | 3
Q | (Slovakia) I Klec | 6 | 4 | 1
Q | (United States) Sean Berman | 3 | 6 | 6
(United Kingdom) J Ward | 6 | 6
7 | (Australia) J Duckworth | 4 | 3
3 | (Canada) P Polansky | 6 | 6
(New Zealand) D King-Turner | 2 | 2
(Australia) G Jones | 6 | 7^{7}
(Australia) A Feeney | 1 | 6^{1}
(South Korea) S-y Jeong | 6 | 6
(Australia) B Mitchell | 3 | 4
WC | (Australia) N Kyrgios | 6 | 6^{5} | 6
6 | (Australia) B Klein | 4 | 7^{7} | 1

Second round
1 | (Japan) Y Sugita | 6 | 6
(Australia) M Reid | 3 | 3
Q | (United States) S Berman | 3 | 2
(United Kingdom) J Ward | 6 | 6
3 | (Canada) P Polansky | 6 | 1 | 6^{7}
(Australia) G Jones | 4 | 6 | 7^{9}
(South Korea) S-y Jeong | 2 | 0
WC | (Australia) N Kyrgios | 6 | 6

Quarterfinals
1 | (Japan) Y Sugita | 2 | 3
(United Kingdom) J Ward | 6 | 6
(Australia) G Jones | 4 | 5
WC | (Australia) N Kyrgios | 6 | 7

Semifinals
(United Kingdom) J Ward | 6 | 5 | 6
WC | (Australia) N Kyrgios | 4 | 7 | 1

=== Bottom half ===
First round
8 | (Italy) A Giannessi | 3^{r}
SE | (Australia) M Barton | 4
(Australia) L Saville | 4 | 7 | 6
WC | (Australia) D Propoggia | 6 | 6^{2} | 2
(Italy) A Arnaboldi | 3 | 6^{4}
(Australia) J-P Smith | 6 | 7^{7}
(France) S Robert | 3 | 6 | 7^{7}
4 | (Australia) J Millman | 6 | 3 | 6^{3}
5 | (Australia) S Groth | 7^{7} | 2
WC | (Australia) C Guccione | 6^{4} | 1^{r}
(Italy) L Vanni | 3 | 2
(New Zealand) J Statham | 6 | 6
Q | (New Zealand) M Venus | 6^{3} | 5
Q | (Australia) C Ebelthite | 7^{7} | 7
(Russia) Aleksandr Lobkov | 6 | 6
2 | (Japan) H Moriya | 3 | 0

Second round
SE | (Australia) M Barton | 6 | 6
(Australia) L Saville | 2 | 2
(Australia) J-P Smith | 6^{4} | 3
(France) S Robert | 7^{7} | 6
5 | (Australia) S Groth | 6 | 6^{5} | 6
(New Zealand) J Statham | 3 | 7^{7} | 3
Q | (Australia) C Ebelthite | 7^{7} | 5 | 2
(Russia) A Lobkov | 6^{5} | 7 | 6

Quarterfinals
SE | (Australia) M Barton | 6 | 6
(France) S Robert | 4 | 1
5 | (Australia) S Groth | 6^{6} | 6^{6}
(Russia) A Lobkov | 7^{8} | 7^{8}

Semifinals
SE | (Australia) M Barton | 6 | 7
(Russia) A Lobkov | 1 | 5
