= 2014 Charles Sturt Adelaide International – Doubles =

Doubles
- 2014 Charles Sturt Adelaide International

Final
- Champions: (New Zealand) Marcus Daniell (United States) Jarmere Jenkins
- Runners-up: (Australia) Dane Propoggia (New Zealand) Jose Rubin Statham
- Score: 6–4, 6–4

Events
Singles	Doubles
← 2013 ·	Charles Sturt Adelaide International

Samuel Groth and Matt Reid were the defending champions, but Groth chose not to compete.
Reid partnered with John-Patrick Smith.

Daniell and Jenkins won the title, defeating Dane Propoggia and Jose Rubin Statham in the final, 6–4, 6–4.

== Seeds ==
1. (Australia) Matt Reid / (Australia) John-Patrick Smith (semifinals)
2. (Australia) Alex Bolt / (Australia) Andrew Whittington (semifinals)
3. (Australia) Dane Propoggia / (New Zealand) Jose Rubin Statham (final)
4. (United Kingdom) Brydan Klein / (Netherlands) Boy Westerhof (first round)

== Draw ==
=== Key ===
- Q = Qualifier
- WC = Wild card
- LL = Lucky loser
- Alt = Alternate
- SE = Special exempt
- PR = Protected ranking
- ITF = ITF entry
- JE = Junior exempt
- w/o = Walkover
- r = Retired
- d = Defaulted
- SR = Special ranking

=== Draw ===
First round
1	(Australia) M Reid (Australia) J-P Smith	4	7	[10]
(Japan) Y Ito (Japan) Shuichi Sekiguchi	6	5	[6]
(Australia) B Mousley (United Kingdom) C Norrie	6	6
(Japan) T Matsui (Thailand) D Udomchoke	3	4
3	(Australia) D Propoggia (New Zealand) J Statham	6^{4}	6	[10]
(United States) B Klahn (United States) M Krueger	7^{7}	3	[8]
(Australia) R Agar (Austria) S Bader	4	4
(Japan) T Ito (Japan) H Moriya	6	6
WC	(Australia) Simon Ede (Australia) C O'Connell	4	4
(New Zealand) M Daniell (United States) J Jenkins	6	6
(Australia) M Banes (Australia) Gavin van Peperzeel	5	6	[10]
4	(United Kingdom) B Klein (Netherlands) B Westerhof	7	4	[5]
WC	(Australia) Darren K. Polkinghorne (Australia) C Puttergill	6	1	[10]
WC	(Australia) Daniel Ferreti (Australia) Aaron Leeder-Chard	4	6	[8]
(Australia) M Barton (Australia) L Saville	2	3
2	(Australia) A Bolt (Australia) A Whittington	6	6

Quarterfinals
1	(Australia) M Reid (Australia) J-P Smith	6	6
(Australia) B Mousley (United Kingdom) C Norrie	1	2
3	(Australia) D Propoggia (New Zealand) J Statham	6	3	[10]
(Japan) T Ito (Japan) H Moriya	3	6	[6]
(New Zealand) M Daniell (United States) J Jenkins	6	6
(Australia) M Banes (Australia) G van Peperzeel	1	1
WC	(Australia) D Polkinghorne (Australia) C Puttergill
2	(Australia) A Bolt (Australia) A Whittington	w/o

Semifinals
1	(Australia) M Reid (Australia) J-P Smith	6^{7}	7	[8]
3	(Australia) D Propoggia (New Zealand) J Statham	7^{9}	5	[10]
(New Zealand) M Daniell (United States) J Jenkins	6	6
2	(Australia) A Bolt (Australia) A Whittington	2	4

Final
3	(Australia) D Propoggia (New Zealand) J Statham	4	4
(New Zealand) M Daniell (United States) J Jenkins	6	6
