= 2016 Wimbledon Championships =

- Date: 27 June – 10 July
- Edition: 130th
- Category: Grand Slam (ITF)
- Draw: 128S / 64D / 48XD
- Prize money: £28.1 million
- Surface: Grass
- Location: Church Road; SW19, Wimbledon, London, United Kingdom
- Venue: All England Lawn Tennis and Croquet Club

Champions

Men's singles
- (United Kingdom) Andy Murray

Women's singles
- (United States) Serena Williams

Men's doubles
- (France) Pierre-Hugues Herbert / (France) Nicolas Mahut

Women's doubles
- (United States) Serena Williams / (United States) Venus Williams

Mixed doubles
- (United Kingdom) Heather Watson / (Finland) Henri Kontinen

Wheelchair men's singles
- (United Kingdom) Gordon Reid

Wheelchair women's singles
- (Netherlands) Jiske Griffioen

Wheelchair men's doubles
- (United Kingdom) Alfie Hewett / (United Kingdom) Gordon Reid

Wheelchair women's doubles
- (Japan) Yui Kamiji / (United Kingdom) Jordanne Whiley

Boys' singles
- (Canada) Denis Shapovalov

Girls' singles
- (Russia) Anastasia Potapova

Boys' doubles
- (Estonia) Kenneth Raisma / (Greece) Stefanos Tsitsipas

Girls' doubles
- (United States) Usue Maitane Arconada / (United States) Claire Liu

Gentlemen's invitation doubles
- (United Kingdom) Greg Rusedski / (France) Fabrice Santoro

Ladies' invitation doubles
- (United States) Martina Navratilova / (Tunisia) Selima Sfar

Senior gentlemen's invitation doubles
- (Australia) Todd Woodbridge / (Australia) Mark Woodforde
- Wimbledon Championships

The 2016 Wimbledon Championships was a Grand Slam tennis tournament which took place at All England Lawn Tennis and Croquet Club in Wimbledon, London, United Kingdom. The main draw commenced on 27 June 2016 and concluded on 10 July 2016.

2016 was the 130th edition of Wimbledon, the 49th in the Open Era and the third Grand Slam tournament of the year. It was played on grass courts and was part of the ATP World Tour, the WTA Tour, the ITF Junior tour and the NEC Tour. The tournament was organised by All England Lawn Tennis Club and International Tennis Federation.

For the first time in the Championships' history, singles events were held in the wheelchair competitions. Thus, all four majors now hold wheelchair singles events, making a complete Grand Slam in the discipline possible.

Novak Djokovic was the two-time defending champion in the gentlemen's singles, but lost in the third round to Sam Querrey, ending a 30-match winning streak at the majors and Djokovic's hopes of becoming the first man to achieve the Golden Slam. The gentlemen's singles title was won by Andy Murray. Serena Williams successfully defended her ladies' singles title and equaled Steffi Graf's Open Era record of 22 major singles titles.

The gentlemen's doubles event consisted of 'best of three sets' matches for rounds 1 and 2 in order to help with 'catch-up' scheduling due to a rain-stricken first week. It was also the first time since 2004 that play took place on Middle Sunday, also known as the People's Sunday, because no tickets are sold in advance or through the ballot and all seats are made available on general sale the day before.

== Tournament ==
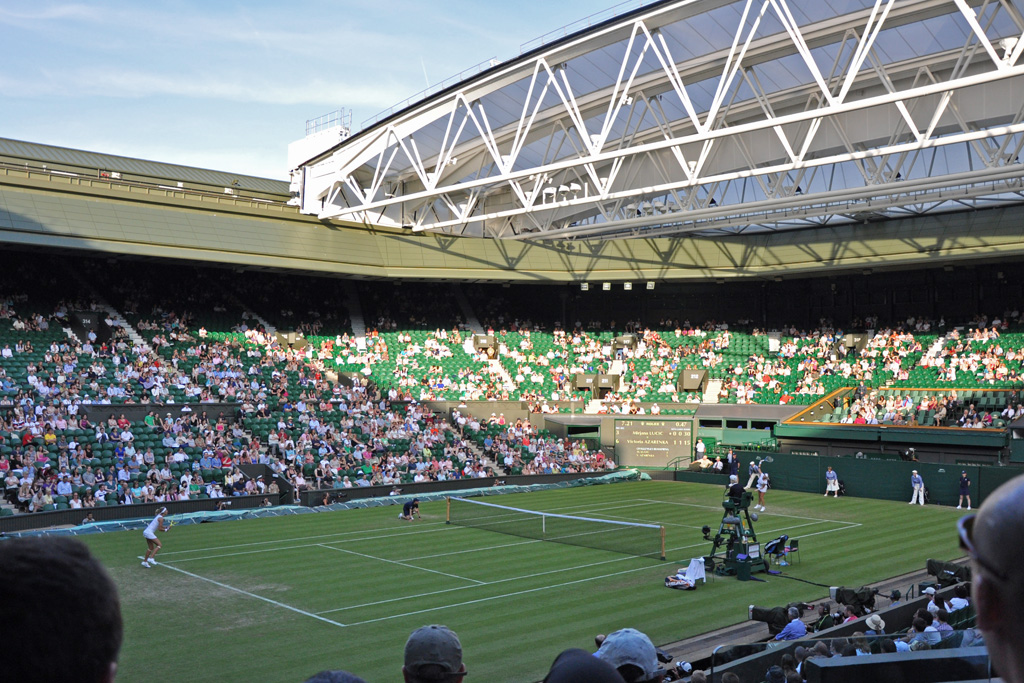
Centre Court where the Finals of Wimbledon take place

The 2016 Wimbledon Championships was the 130th edition of the tournament and was held at the All England Lawn Tennis and Croquet Club in London.

The tournament was run by the International Tennis Federation (ITF) and was included in the 2016 ATP World Tour and the 2016 WTA Tour calendars under the Grand Slam category. The tournament consisted of men's (singles and doubles), women's (singles and doubles), mixed doubles, boys (under 18 – singles and doubles) and girls (under 18 – singles and doubles), which is also a part of the Grade A category of tournaments for under 18, doubles events for men's and women's wheelchair tennis players as part of the UNIQLO Tour under the Grand Slam category and, for the first time in the tournament history this year, men's and women's singles events for wheelchair tennis players. The tournament was played only on grass courts; main draw matches were played at the All England Lawn Tennis and Croquet Club, Wimbledon; qualifying matches were played at the Bank of England Sports Ground, Roehampton.

== Point and prize money distribution ==
=== Point distribution ===
Below are the tables with the point distribution for each phase of the tournament.

==== Senior points ====
Event	W	F	SF	QF	Round of 16	Round of 32	Round of 64	Round of 128	Q	Q3	Q2	Q1
Men's singles	2000	1200	720	360	180	90	45	10	25	16	8	0
Men's doubles	2000	1200	720	360	180	90	0	—	25	—	0	0
Women's singles	2000	1300	780	430	240	130	70	10	40	30	20	2
Women's doubles	2000	1300	780	430	240	130	10	—	—	—	—	—

==== Wheelchair points ====
Event	W	F	3rd	4th
Singles	800	500	375	100
Doubles	800	500	100	—

==== Junior points ====
Event	W	F	SF	QF	Round of 16	Round of 32	Q	Q2	Q1
Boys' singles	375	270	180	120	75	30	25	20	0
Girls' singles	375	270	180	120	75	30	25	20	0
Boys' doubles	270	180	120	75	45	—	—	—	—
Girls' doubles	270	180	120	75	45	—	—	—	—

=== Prize money ===
The total prize money for this year's tournament was £28.10m, an increase of 5% from last year tournament. The winners of the men's singles and women's singles earned £2 million each, an increase of £120,000 from the previous year. The prize money for men's doubles, women's doubles and wheelchair players was also increased for this year's competition.

Event	W	F	SF	QF	Round of 16	Round of 32	Round of 64	Round of 128	Q3	Q2	Q1
Singles	£2,000,000	£1,000,000	£500,000	£250,000	£132,000	£80,000	£50,000	£30,000	£15,000	£7,500	£3,750
Doubles*	£350,000	£175,000	£88,000	£44,000	£23,250	£14,250	£9,250	—	—	—	—
Mixed doubles*	£100,000	£50,000	£25,000	£12,000	£6,000	£3,000	£1,500	—	—	—	—
Wheelchair singles	£25,000	£12,500	£8,000	£5,375	—	—	—	—	—	—	—
Wheelchair doubles*	£12,000	£6,000	£3,500	—	—	—	—	—	—	—	—
Invitation doubles*	£22,000	£19,000	£16,000	£16,000	£16,000	—	—	—	—	—	—

_{* per team}

== Singles players ==
Gentlemen's singles

Champion		Runner-up	
(United Kingdom) Andy Murray [2]		(Canada) Milos Raonic [6]	
Semifinals out
(Switzerland) Roger Federer [3]		(Czech Republic) Tomáš Berdych [10]	
Quarterfinals out
(United States) Sam Querrey [28]	(Croatia) Marin Čilić [9]	(France) Jo-Wilfried Tsonga [12]	(France) Lucas Pouille [32]
4th round out
(France) Nicolas Mahut	(Belgium) David Goffin [11]	(United States) Steve Johnson	(Japan) Kei Nishikori [5]
(Czech Republic) Jiří Veselý	(Australia) Bernard Tomic [19]	(France) Richard Gasquet [7]	(Australia) Nick Kyrgios [15]
3rd round out
(Serbia) Novak Djokovic [1]	(France) Pierre-Hugues Herbert	(Uzbekistan) Denis Istomin	(United States) Jack Sock [27]
(United Kingdom) Daniel Evans	(Bulgaria) Grigor Dimitrov	(Slovakia) Lukáš Lacko (Q)	(Russia) Andrey Kuznetsov
(Portugal) João Sousa [31]	(Germany) Alexander Zverev [24]	(Spain) Roberto Bautista Agut [14]	(Argentina) Juan Martín del Potro (PR)
(Spain) Albert Ramos	(United States) John Isner [18]	(Spain) Feliciano López [22]	(Australia) John Millman
2nd round out
(France) Adrian Mannarino	(Brazil) Thomaz Bellucci	(Bosnia and Herzegovina) Damir Džumhur	(Spain) David Ferrer [13]
(France) Édouard Roger-Vasselin (Q)	(Spain) Nicolás Almagro	(Netherlands) Robin Haase	(Italy) Andreas Seppi
(United Kingdom) Marcus Willis (Q)	(Ukraine) Alexandr Dolgopolov [30]	(France) Jérémy Chardy	(France) Gilles Simon [16]
(Ukraine) Sergiy Stakhovsky	(Croatia) Ivo Karlović [23]	(Luxembourg) Gilles Müller	(France) Julien Benneteau (PR)
(Austria) Dominic Thiem [8]	(United States) Dennis Novikov (Q)	(Russia) Mikhail Youzhny	(Germany) Benjamin Becker
(Kazakhstan) Mikhail Kukushkin	(Moldova) Radu Albot (Q)	(United States) Donald Young	(Switzerland) Stan Wawrinka [4]
(Spain) Marcel Granollers	(Serbia) Viktor Troicki [25]	(Australia) Matthew Barton (Q)	(Argentina) Juan Mónaco
(Germany) Dustin Brown (WC)	(Italy) Fabio Fognini	(France) Benoît Paire [26]	(Chinese Taipei) Lu Yen-hsun (PR)
1st round out
(United Kingdom) James Ward (WC)	(United Kingdom) Kyle Edmund	(Belgium) Ruben Bemelmans	(Czech Republic) Lukáš Rosol
(Germany) Philipp Kohlschreiber [21]	(United States) Denis Kudla	(United Kingdom) Brydan Klein (WC)	(Israel) Dudi Sela
(United Kingdom) Alexander Ward (WC)	(Russia) Teymuraz Gabashvili	(Brazil) Rogério Dutra Silva	(South Africa) Kevin Anderson [20]
(Latvia) Ernests Gulbis	(Argentina) Diego Schwartzman	(Spain) Guillermo García López	(Spain) Pablo Carreño Busta
(Argentina) Guido Pella	(Lithuania) Ričardas Berankis	(Germany) Jan-Lennard Struff	(Russia) Evgeny Donskoy
(France) Gaël Monfils [17]	(Tunisia) Malek Jaziri	(United States) Bjorn Fratangelo (Q)	(Serbia) Janko Tipsarević (PR)
(United States) Brian Baker (PR)	(Japan) Yoshihito Nishioka (Q)	(Italy) Paolo Lorenzi	(Croatia) Borna Ćorić
(Uruguay) Pablo Cuevas [29]	(Colombia) Santiago Giraldo	(Ukraine) Illya Marchenko	(Australia) Sam Groth
(Germany) Florian Mayer (PR)	(Netherlands) Igor Sijsling (Q)	(Australia) Luke Saville (Q)	(Russia) Dmitry Tursunov (PR)
(France) Paul-Henri Mathieu	(Argentina) Horacio Zeballos	(Argentina) Facundo Bagnis	(Croatia) Ivan Dodig
(Australia) Jordan Thompson	(Slovakia) Martin Kližan	(Portugal) Gastão Elias	(Spain) Fernando Verdasco
(Romania) Marius Copil (Q)	(Argentina) Leonardo Mayer	(France) Stéphane Robert	(United States) Taylor Fritz
(United Kingdom) Aljaž Bedene	(Dominican Republic) Víctor Estrella Burgos	(Canada) Vasek Pospisil	(France) Tristan Lamasine (Q)
(Cyprus) Marcos Baghdatis	(France) Albano Olivetti (Q)	(Japan) Taro Daniel	(Spain) Íñigo Cervantes
(Czech Republic) Radek Štěpánek (WC)	(Serbia) Dušan Lajović	(Argentina) Federico Delbonis	(United States) Rajeev Ram
(Croatia) Franko Škugor (Q)	(Spain) Albert Montañés	(Russia) Alexander Kudryavtsev (Q)	(United Kingdom) Liam Broady (WC)

Ladies' singles

Champion		Runner-up	
(United States) Serena Williams [1]		(Germany) Angelique Kerber [4]	
Semifinals out
(Russia) Elena Vesnina		(United States) Venus Williams [8]	
Quarterfinals out
(Russia) Anastasia Pavlyuchenkova [21]	(Slovakia) Dominika Cibulková [19]	(Romania) Simona Halep [5]	(Kazakhstan) Yaroslava Shvedova
4th round out
(Russia) Svetlana Kuznetsova [13]	(United States) CoCo Vandeweghe [27]	(Poland) Agnieszka Radwańska [3]	(Russia) Ekaterina Makarova
(United States) Madison Keys [9]	(Japan) Misaki Doi	(Spain) Carla Suárez Navarro [12]	(Czech Republic) Lucie Šafářová [28]
3rd round out
(Germany) Annika Beck	(United States) Sloane Stephens [18]	(Switzerland) Timea Bacsinszky [11]	(Italy) Roberta Vinci [6]
(Czech Republic) Kateřina Siniaková	(Canada) Eugenie Bouchard	(Czech Republic) Barbora Strýcová [24]	(United States) Julia Boserup (Q)
(Netherlands) Kiki Bertens [26]	(France) Alizé Cornet	(Germany) Anna-Lena Friedsam	(Germany) Carina Witthöft
(Russia) Daria Kasatkina [29]	(New Zealand) Marina Erakovic (Q)	(Germany) Sabine Lisicki	(Slovakia) Jana Čepelová (Q)
2nd round out
(United States) Christina McHale	(Belarus) Aliaksandra Sasnovich	(Luxembourg) Mandy Minella (Q)	(United Kingdom) Tara Moore (WC)
(Romania) Monica Niculescu	(Kazakhstan) Yulia Putintseva	(Hungary) Tímea Babos	(China) Duan Yingying (LL)
(Croatia) Ana Konjuh	(France) Caroline Garcia [30]	(Australia) Daria Gavrilova	(United Kingdom) Johanna Konta [16]
(Czech Republic) Petra Kvitová [10]	(Russia) Evgeniya Rodina (WC)	(Germany) Andrea Petkovic [32]	(Switzerland) Belinda Bencic [7]
(Italy) Francesca Schiavone	(Germany) Mona Barthel	(Italy) Sara Errani [20]	(Belgium) Kirsten Flipkens
(Czech Republic) Karolína Plíšková [15]	(Russia) Ekaterina Alexandrova (Q)	(Japan) Kurumi Nara	(United States) Varvara Lepchenko
(Greece) Maria Sakkari (Q)	(Spain) Lara Arruabarrena	(Serbia) Jelena Janković [22]	(Czech Republic) Denisa Allertová
(Australia) Samantha Stosur [14]	(Ukraine) Elina Svitolina [17]	(United States) Samantha Crawford	(Spain) Garbiñe Muguruza [2]
1st round out
(Switzerland) Amra Sadiković (Q)	(Slovakia) Daniela Hantuchová (WC)	(United Kingdom) Heather Watson	(France) Kristina Mladenovic [31]
(China) Peng Shuai (PR)	(United States) Anna Tatishvili	(Belgium) Alison Van Uytvanck	(Denmark) Caroline Wozniacki
(Thailand) Luksika Kumkhum (Q)	(Serbia) Aleksandra Krunić (Q)	(Russia) Marina Melnikova (WC)	(Chinese Taipei) Hsieh Su-wei
(Ukraine) Kateryna Bondarenko	(United Kingdom) Katie Swan (WC)	(Czech Republic) Kristýna Plíšková	(United States) Alison Riske
(Ukraine) Kateryna Kozlova	(Italy) Karin Knapp	(France) Pauline Parmentier	(Turkey) Çağla Büyükakçay
(Croatia) Mirjana Lučić-Baroni	(China) Wang Qiang	(Slovakia) Magdaléna Rybáriková	(Puerto Rico) Monica Puig
(Romania) Sorana Cîrstea	(Sweden) Johanna Larsson	(Ukraine) Lesia Tsurenko	(Estonia) Anett Kontaveit
(Japan) Nao Hibino	(Austria) Tamira Paszek (Q)	(Germany) Tatjana Maria (Q)	(Bulgaria) Tsvetana Pironkova
(Slovakia) Anna Karolína Schmiedlová	(Latvia) Anastasija Sevastova	(Montenegro) Danka Kovinić	(Latvia) Jeļena Ostapenko
(Romania) Patricia Maria Țig	(Slovenia) Polona Hercog	(United States) Nicole Gibbs	(Germany) Laura Siegemund
(Belgium) Yanina Wickmayer	(United States) Louisa Chirico	(Kazakhstan) Zarina Diyas	(Serbia) Ana Ivanovic [23]
(Romania) Irina-Camelia Begu [25]	(United States) Madison Brengle	(Brazil) Teliana Pereira	(United Kingdom) Laura Robson (WC)
(Croatia) Donna Vekić	(China) Zheng Saisai	(Belarus) Olga Govortsova	(United States) Victoria Duval (PR)
(Switzerland) Stefanie Vögele	(United States) Irina Falconi	(Russia) Margarita Gasparyan	(China) Zhang Shuai
(Poland) Magda Linette	(United States) Shelby Rogers	(Germany) Julia Görges	(United Kingdom) Naomi Broady
(United States) Bethanie Mattek-Sands	(Poland) Paula Kania (Q)	(Colombia) Mariana Duque Mariño	(Italy) Camila Giorgi

== Singles seeds ==
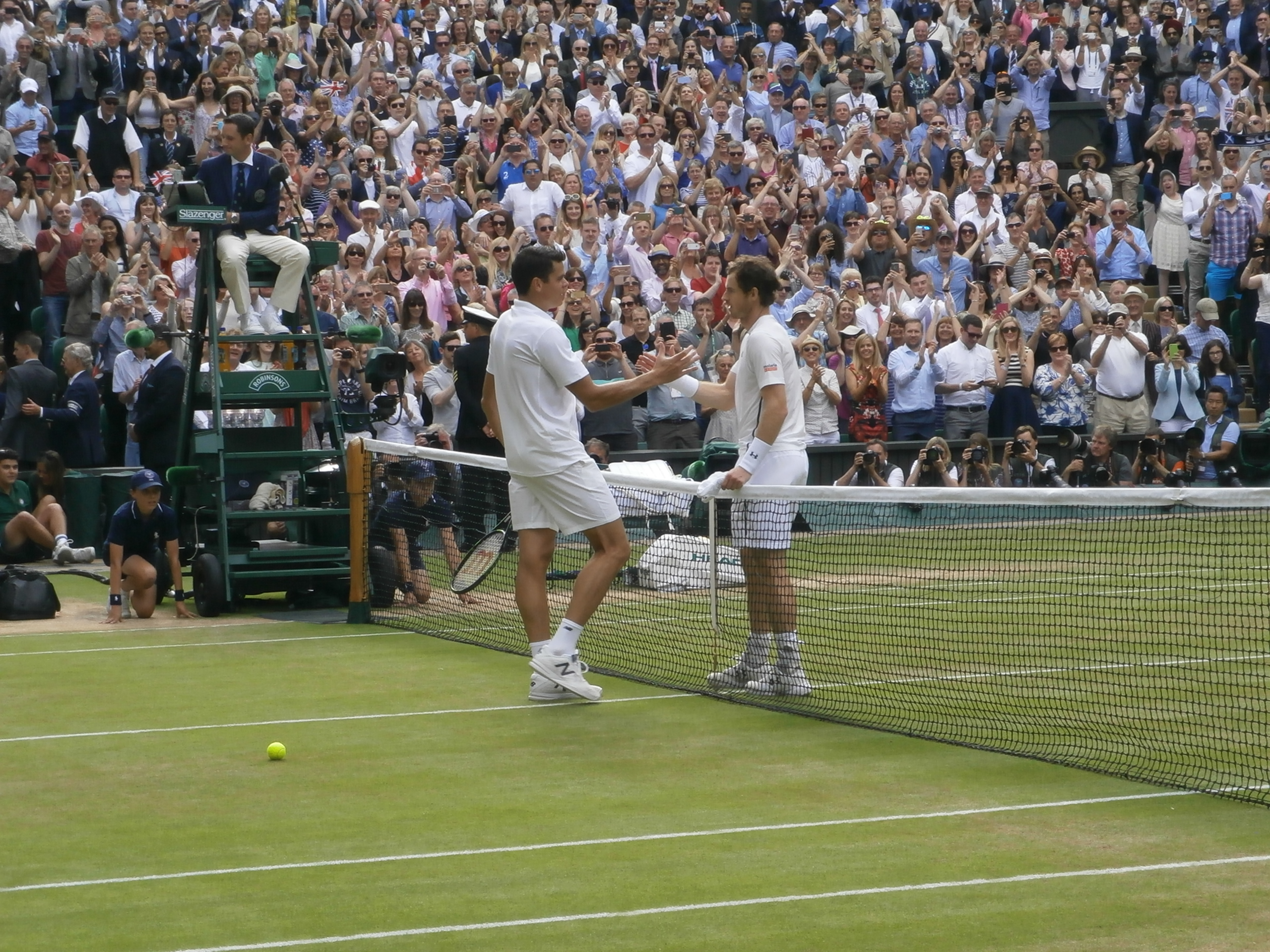
Andy Murray shakes hands with Milos Raonic at the completion of the men's singles final.

The seeds for the 2016 Wimbledon Championships were announced on Wednesday, 22 June 2016.

=== Gentlemen's singles ===
The seeds for gentlemen's singles are adjusted on a surface-based system to reflect more accurately the individual player's grass court achievement as per the following formula, which applies to the top 32 players according to the ATP rankings on 20 June 2016:

- Take Entry System Position points at 20 June 2016.
- Add 100% points earned for all grass court tournaments in the past 12 months (22 June 2015 – 19 June 2016).
- Add 75% points earned for best grass court tournament in the 12 months before that (16 June 2014 – 21 June 2015).

Rank and points before are as of 27 June 2016.

Seed	Rank	Player	Points before	Points defending	Points won	Points after	Status
1	1	(Serbia) Novak Djokovic	16,950	2,000	90	15,040	Third round lost to (United States) Sam Querrey [28]
2	2	(United Kingdom) Andy Murray	8,915	720	2,000	10,195	Champion, defeated (Canada) Milos Raonic [6]
3	3	(Switzerland) Roger Federer	6,425	1,200	720	5,945	Semifinals lost to (Canada) Milos Raonic [6]
4	5	(Switzerland) Stan Wawrinka	5,035	360	45	4,720	Second round lost to (Argentina) Juan Martín del Potro [PR]
5	6	(Japan) Kei Nishikori	4,155	45	180	4,290	Fourth round retired against (Croatia) Marin Čilić [9]
6	7	(Canada) Milos Raonic	3,175	90	1,200	4,285	Runner-up, lost to (United Kingdom) Andy Murray [2]
7	10	(France) Richard Gasquet	2,905	720	180	2,365	Fourth round retired against (France) Jo-Wilfried Tsonga [12]
8	8	(Austria) Dominic Thiem	3,175	45	45	3,175	Second round lost to (Czech Republic) Jiří Veselý
9	13	(Croatia) Marin Čilić	2,695	360	360	2,695	Quarterfinals lost to (Switzerland) Roger Federer [3]
10	9	(Czech Republic) Tomáš Berdych	2,950	180	720	3,490	Semifinals lost to (United Kingdom) Andy Murray [2]
11	11	(Belgium) David Goffin	2,780	180	180	2,780	Fourth round lost to (Canada) Milos Raonic [6]
12	12	(France) Jo-Wilfried Tsonga	2,725	90	360	2,995	Quarterfinals lost to (United Kingdom) Andy Murray [2]
13	14	(Spain) David Ferrer	2,605	0	45	2,650	Second round lost to (France) Nicolas Mahut
14	15	(Spain) Roberto Bautista Agut	2,150	180	90	2,060	Third round lost to (Australia) Bernard Tomic [19]
15	18	(Australia) Nick Kyrgios	1,855	180	180	1,855	Fourth round lost to (United Kingdom) Andy Murray [2]
16	20	(France) Gilles Simon	1,720	360	45	1,405	Second round lost to (Bulgaria) Grigor Dimitrov
17	16	(France) Gaël Monfils	2,110	90	10	2,030	First round lost to (France) Jérémy Chardy
18	17	(United States) John Isner	2,055	90	90	2,055	Third round lost (France) Jo-Wilfried Tsonga [12]
19	19	(Australia) Bernard Tomic	1,760	90	180	1,850	Fourth round lost to (France) Lucas Pouille [32]
20	25	(South Africa) Kevin Anderson	1,505	180	10	1,335	First round lost to (Uzbekistan) Denis Istomin
21	22	(Germany) Philipp Kohlschreiber	1,600	10	10	1,600	First round lost to (France) Pierre-Hugues Herbert
22	21	(Spain) Feliciano López	1,630	45	90	1,675	Third round lost to (Australia) Nick Kyrgios [15]
23	32	(Croatia) Ivo Karlović	1,270	180	45	1,135	Second round lost to (Slovakia) Lukáš Lacko [Q]
24	28	(Germany) Alexander Zverev	1,385	45	90	1,430	Third round lost to (Czech Republic) Tomáš Berdych [10]
25	27	(Serbia) Viktor Troicki	1,405	180	45	1,270	Second round lost to (Spain) Albert Ramos Viñolas
26	23	(France) Benoît Paire	1,596	45	45	1,596	Second round lost to (Australia) John Millman
27	26	(United States) Jack Sock	1,415	10	90	1,495	Third round lost to (Canada) Milos Raonic [6]
28	41	(United States) Sam Querrey	1,075	45	360	1,390	Quarterfinals lost to (Canada) Milos Raonic [6]
29	24	(Uruguay) Pablo Cuevas	1,555	10	10	1,555	First round lost to (Russia) Andrey Kuznetsov
30	33	(Ukraine) Alexandr Dolgopolov	1,215	45	45	1,215	Second round lost to (United Kingdom) Daniel Evans
31	31	(Portugal) João Sousa	1,275	10	90	1,355	Third round lost to (Czech Republic) Jiří Veselý
32	30	(France) Lucas Pouille	1,311	10	360	1,661	Quarterfinals lost to (Czech Republic) Tomáš Berdych [10]

==== Withdrawn players ====
Rank	Player	Points before	Points defending	Points after	Withdrawal reason
4	(Spain) Rafael Nadal	5,335	45	5,290	Wrist injury

=== Ladies' singles ===
The seeds for ladies' singles are based on the WTA rankings as of 20 June 2016. Rank and points before are as of 27 June 2016.

Seed	Rank	Player	Points before	Points defending	Points won	Points after	Status
1	1	(United States) Serena Williams	8,330	2,000	2,000	8,330	Champion, defeated (Germany) Angelique Kerber [4]
2	2	(Spain) Garbiñe Muguruza	6,712	1,300	70	5,482	Second round lost to (Slovakia) Jana Čepelová [Q]
3	3	(Poland) Agnieszka Radwańska	5,875	780	240	5,355	Fourth round lost to (Slovakia) Dominika Cibulková [19]
4	4	(Germany) Angelique Kerber	5,330	130	1,300	6,500	Runner-up, lost to (United States) Serena Williams [1]
5	5	(Romania) Simona Halep	4,372	10	430	4,792	Quarterfinals lost to (Germany) Angelique Kerber [4]
6	7	(Italy) Roberta Vinci	3,405	10	130	3,525	Third round lost to (United States) CoCo Vandeweghe [27]
7	13	(Switzerland) Belinda Bencic	2,775	240	70	2,605	Second round retired against (United States) Julia Boserup [Q]
8	8	(United States) Venus Williams	3,116	240	780	3,656	Semifinals lost to (Germany) Angelique Kerber [4]
9	9	(United States) Madison Keys	3,061	430	240	2,871	Fourth round lost to (Romania) Simona Halep [5]
10	10	(Czech Republic) Petra Kvitová	2,876	130	70	2,816	Second round lost to (Russia) Ekaterina Makarova
11	11	(Switzerland) Timea Bacsinszky	2,800	430	130	2,500	Third round lost to (Russia) Anastasia Pavlyuchenkova [21]
12	12	(Spain) Carla Suárez Navarro	2,780	10	240	3,010	Fourth round lost to (United States) Venus Williams [8]
13	14	(Russia) Svetlana Kuznetsova	2,730	70	240	2,900	Fourth round lost to (United States) Serena Williams [1]
14	16	(Australia) Samantha Stosur	2,700	130	70	2,640	Second round lost to (Germany) Sabine Lisicki
15	17	(Czech Republic) Karolína Plíšková	2,540	70	70	2,540	Second round lost to (Japan) Misaki Doi
16	19	(United Kingdom) Johanna Konta	2,330	10	70	2,390	Second round lost to (Canada) Eugenie Bouchard
17	20	(Ukraine) Elina Svitolina	2,226	70	70	2,226	Second round lost to (Kazakhstan) Yaroslava Shvedova
18	22	(United States) Sloane Stephens	1,995	130	130	1,995	Third round lost to (Russia) Svetlana Kuznetsova [13]
19	18	(Slovakia) Dominika Cibulková	2,541	10 (+90)	430	2,871	Quarterfinals lost to (Russia) Elena Vesnina
20	21	(Italy) Sara Errani	2,030	70	70	2,030	Second round lost to (France) Alizé Cornet
21	23	(Russia) Anastasia Pavlyuchenkova	1,960	70	430	2,320	Quarterfinals lost to (United States) Serena Williams [1]
22	24	(Serbia) Jelena Janković	1,940	240	70	1,770	Second round lost to (New Zealand) Marina Erakovic [Q]
23	25	(Serbia) Ana Ivanovic	1,915	70	10	1,855	First round lost to (Russia) Ekaterina Alexandrova [Q]
24	26	(Czech Republic) Barbora Strýcová	1,885	10	130	2,005	Third round lost to (Russia) Ekaterina Makarova
25	27	(Romania) Irina-Camelia Begu	1,765	130	10	1,645	First round lost to (Germany) Carina Witthöft
26	28	(Netherlands) Kiki Bertens	1,729	10	130	1,849	Third round lost to (Romania) Simona Halep [5]
27	30	(United States) CoCo Vandeweghe	1,652	430	240	1,462	Fourth round lost to (Russia) Anastasia Pavlyuchenkova [21]
28	29	(Czech Republic) Lucie Šafářová	1,673	240	240	1,673	Fourth round lost to (Kazakhstan) Yaroslava Shvedova
29	33	(Russia) Daria Kasatkina	1,586	(13)	130	1,703	Third round lost to (United States) Venus Williams [8]
30	31	(France) Caroline Garcia	1,585	10	70	1,645	Second round lost to (Czech Republic) Kateřina Siniaková
31	32	(France) Kristina Mladenovic	1,585	130	10	1,465	First round lost to (Belarus) Aliaksandra Sasnovich
32	38	(Germany) Andrea Petkovic	1,440	130	70	1,380	Second round lost to (Russia) Elena Vesnina

==== Withdrawn players ====
Rank	Player	Points before	Points defending	Points after	Withdrawal reason
6	(Belarus) Victoria Azarenka	4,191	430	3,761	Right knee injury
15	(Italy) Flavia Pennetta	2,722	10	2,712	Retirement
35	(Russia) Maria Sharapova	1,471	780	691	Provisional suspension

== Doubles seeds ==
=== Gentlemen's doubles ===
Team		Rank^{1}	Seed
(France) Pierre-Hugues Herbert	(France) Nicolas Mahut	5	1
(United States) Bob Bryan	(United States) Mike Bryan	9	2
(United Kingdom) Jamie Murray	(Brazil) Bruno Soares	10	3
(Netherlands) Jean-Julien Rojer	(Romania) Horia Tecău	13	4
(Croatia) Ivan Dodig	(Brazil) Marcelo Melo	23	5
(India) Rohan Bopanna	(Romania) Florin Mergea	23	6
(Poland) Łukasz Kubot	(Austria) Alexander Peya	40	7
(Canada) Vasek Pospisil	(United States) Jack Sock	42	8
(United Kingdom) Dominic Inglot	(Canada) Daniel Nestor	43	9
(Finland) Henri Kontinen	(Australia) John Peers	45	10
(South Africa) Raven Klaasen	(United States) Rajeev Ram	45	11
(Philippines) Treat Huey	(Belarus) Max Mirnyi	49	12
(Colombia) Juan Sebastián Cabal	(Colombia) Robert Farah	55	13
(Czech Republic) Radek Štěpánek	(Serbia) Nenad Zimonjić	57	14
(Uruguay) Pablo Cuevas	(Spain) Marcel Granollers	71	15
(Croatia) Mate Pavić	(New Zealand) Michael Venus	73	16

- ^{1} Rankings are as of 20 June 2016.

=== Ladies' doubles ===
Team		Rank^{1}	Seed
(Switzerland) Martina Hingis	(India) Sania Mirza	2	1
(France) Caroline Garcia	(France) Kristina Mladenovic	7	2
(Chinese Taipei) Chan Hao-ching	(Chinese Taipei) Chan Yung-jan	11	3
(Russia) Ekaterina Makarova	(Russia) Elena Vesnina	19	4
(Hungary) Tímea Babos	(Kazakhstan) Yaroslava Shvedova	21	5
(Czech Republic) Andrea Hlaváčková	(Czech Republic) Lucie Hradecká	21	6
(United States) Bethanie Mattek-Sands	(Czech Republic) Lucie Šafářová	23	7
(Germany) Julia Görges	(Czech Republic) Karolína Plíšková	34	8
(China) Xu Yifan	(China) Zheng Saisai	34	9
(United States) Raquel Atawo	(United States) Abigail Spears	46	10
(Slovenia) Andreja Klepač	(Slovenia) Katarina Srebotnik	52	11
(Russia) Margarita Gasparyan	(Romania) Monica Niculescu	55	12
(United States) Vania King	(Russia) Alla Kudryavtseva	58	13
(Spain) Anabel Medina Garrigues	(Spain) Arantxa Parra Santonja	60	14
(Italy) Sara Errani	(Georgia (country)) Oksana Kalashnikova	70	15
(Netherlands) Kiki Bertens	(Sweden) Johanna Larsson	70	16

- ^{1} Rankings are as of 20 June 2016.

=== Mixed doubles ===
Team		Rank^{1}	Seed
(Croatia) Ivan Dodig	(India) Sania Mirza	16	1
(Brazil) Bruno Soares	(Russia) Elena Vesnina	16	2
(Romania) Horia Tecău	(United States) CoCo Vandeweghe	26	3
(Belarus) Max Mirnyi	(Chinese Taipei) Chan Hao-ching	30	4
(Serbia) Nenad Zimonjić	(Chinese Taipei) Chan Yung-jan	31	5
(Poland) Łukasz Kubot	(Czech Republic) Andrea Hlaváčková	32	6
(South Africa) Raven Klaasen	(United States) Raquel Atawo	38	7
(Netherlands) Jean-Julien Rojer	(Netherlands) Kiki Bertens	43	8
(Czech Republic) Radek Štěpánek	(Czech Republic) Lucie Šafářová	45	9
(Austria) Alexander Peya	(Slovenia) Andreja Klepač	51	10
(Poland) Marcin Matkowski	(Slovenia) Katarina Srebotnik	51	11
(Canada) Daniel Nestor	(Chinese Taipei) Chuang Chia-jung	53	12
(India) Rohan Bopanna	(Australia) Anastasia Rodionova	54	13
(Pakistan) Aisam-ul-Haq Qureshi	(Kazakhstan) Yaroslava Shvedova	54	14
(Colombia) Robert Farah	(Germany) Anna-Lena Grönefeld	55	15
(India) Leander Paes	(Switzerland) Martina Hingis	56	16

- ^{1} Rankings are as of 27 June 2016.

== Main draw wild card entries ==
The following players were given wild cards into the main draw senior events, based on internal selection and recent performances.

=== Gentlemen's singles ===
- (United Kingdom) Liam Broady
- (Germany) Dustin Brown
- (United Kingdom) Brydan Klein
- (Czech Republic) Radek Štěpánek
- (United Kingdom) Alexander Ward
- (United Kingdom) James Ward

=== Ladies' singles ===
- (Slovakia) Daniela Hantuchová
- (Russia) Marina Melnikova
- (United Kingdom) Tara Moore
- (United Kingdom) Laura Robson
- (Russia) Evgeniya Rodina
- (United Kingdom) Katie Swan

=== Gentlemen's doubles ===
- (United Kingdom) Kyle Edmund / (United Kingdom) James Ward
- (United Kingdom) Daniel Evans / (United Kingdom) Lloyd Glasspool
- (Australia) Lleyton Hewitt / (Australia) Jordan Thompson
- (United Kingdom) Brydan Klein / (United Kingdom) Alexander Ward
- (United Kingdom) Jonathan Marray / (Canada) Adil Shamasdin
- (United Kingdom) Ken Skupski / (United Kingdom) Neal Skupski

=== Ladies' doubles ===
- (Australia) Ashleigh Barty / (United Kingdom) Laura Robson
- (Slovakia) Daniela Hantuchová / (Croatia) Donna Vekić
- (United Kingdom) Tara Moore / (Switzerland) Conny Perrin
- (United Kingdom) Jocelyn Rae / (United Kingdom) Anna Smith

=== Mixed doubles ===
- (United Kingdom) Liam Broady / (United Kingdom) Naomi Broady
- (United Kingdom) Colin Fleming / (United Kingdom) Jocelyn Rae
- (United Kingdom) Dominic Inglot / (United Kingdom) Laura Robson
- (United Kingdom) Ken Skupski / (United Kingdom) Tara Moore
- (United Kingdom) Neal Skupski / (United Kingdom) Anna Smith

== Main draw qualifiers ==
=== Gentlemen's singles ===
Men's singles qualifiers

1. (Australia) Matthew Barton
2. (Russia) Alexander Kudryavtsev
3. (France) Tristan Lamasine
4. (United Kingdom) Marcus Willis
5. (Belgium) Ruben Bemelmans
6. (United States) Bjorn Fratangelo
7. (Australia) Luke Saville
8. (Romania) Marius Copil
9. (Netherlands) Igor Sijsling
10. (France) Albano Olivetti
11. (Slovakia) Lukáš Lacko
12. (Japan) Yoshihito Nishioka
13. (Croatia) Franko Škugor
14. (United States) Dennis Novikov
15. (Moldova) Radu Albot
16. (France) Édouard Roger-Vasselin

=== Ladies' singles ===
Women's singles qualifiers

1. (Germany) Tatjana Maria
2. (Switzerland) Amra Sadiković
3. (Slovakia) Jana Čepelová
4. (Serbia) Aleksandra Krunić
5. (Greece) Maria Sakkari
6. (United States) Julia Boserup
7. (Austria) Tamira Paszek
8. (Thailand) Luksika Kumkhum
9. (Luxembourg) Mandy Minella
10. (Russia) Ekaterina Alexandrova
11. (New Zealand) Marina Erakovic
12. (Poland) Paula Kania

Lucky losers

1. (China) Duan Yingying

=== Gentlemen's doubles ===
Men's doubles qualifiers

1. (France) Quentin Halys / (France) Tristan Lamasine
2. (Russia) Konstantin Kravchuk / (Ukraine) Denys Molchanov
3. (El Salvador) Marcelo Arévalo / (Venezuela) Roberto Maytín
4. (Germany) Dustin Brown / (Germany) Jan-Lennard Struff

Lucky losers

1. (Thailand) Sanchai Ratiwatana / (Thailand) Sonchat Ratiwatana

=== Ladies' doubles ===
Women's doubles qualifiers

1. (Netherlands) Demi Schuurs / (Czech Republic) Renata Voráčová
2. (Belgium) Elise Mertens / (Belgium) An-Sophie Mestach
3. (Chinese Taipei) Chan Chin-wei / (China) Han Xinyun
4. (Japan) Shuko Aoyama / (Japan) Makoto Ninomiya

== Protected ranking ==
The following players were accepted directly into the main draw using a protected ranking:

Men's singles

- (Argentina) Juan Martín del Potro (7)
- (Germany) Florian Mayer (34)
- (France) Julien Benneteau (39)
- (Serbia) Janko Tipsarević (39)
- (United States) Brian Baker (56)
- (Chinese Taipei) Lu Yen-hsun (77)
- (Russia) Dmitry Tursunov (89)

Women's singles

- (China) Peng Shuai (27)
- (United States) Victoria Duval (92)

== Champions ==
=== Seniors ===
==== Gentlemen's singles ====
- (United Kingdom) Andy Murray def. (Canada) Milos Raonic, 6–4, 7–6^{(7–3)}, 7–6^{(7–2)}

==== Ladies' singles ====
- (United States) Serena Williams def. (Germany) Angelique Kerber, 7–5, 6–3

==== Gentlemen's doubles ====
- (France) Pierre-Hugues Herbert / (France) Nicolas Mahut def. (France) Julien Benneteau / (France) Édouard Roger-Vasselin, 6–4, 7–6^{(7–1)}, 6–3

==== Ladies' doubles ====
- (United States) Serena Williams / (United States) Venus Williams def. (Hungary) Tímea Babos / (Kazakhstan) Yaroslava Shvedova, 6–3, 6–4

==== Mixed doubles ====
- (Finland) Henri Kontinen / (United Kingdom) Heather Watson def. (Colombia) Robert Farah / (Germany) Anna-Lena Grönefeld 7–6^{(7–5)}, 6–4

=== Juniors ===
==== Boys' singles ====
- (Canada) Denis Shapovalov def. (Australia) Alex de Minaur, 4–6, 6–1, 6–3

==== Girls' singles ====
- (Russia) Anastasia Potapova def. (Ukraine) Dayana Yastremska, 6–4, 6–3

==== Boys' doubles ====
- (Estonia) Kenneth Raisma / (Greece) Stefanos Tsitsipas def. (Canada) Félix Auger-Aliassime / (Canada) Denis Shapovalov, 4–6, 6–4, 6–2

==== Girls' doubles ====
- (United States) Usue Maitane Arconada / (United States) Claire Liu def. (Georgia (country)) Mariam Bolkvadze / (United States) Caty McNally, 6–2, 6–3

=== Invitation ===
==== Gentlemen's invitation doubles ====
- (United Kingdom) Greg Rusedski / (France) Fabrice Santoro def. (Sweden) Jonas Björkman / (Sweden) Thomas Johansson, 7–5, 6–1

==== Ladies' invitation doubles ====
- (United States) Martina Navratilova / (Tunisia) Selima Sfar def. (United States) Lindsay Davenport / (United States) Mary Joe Fernández, 7–6^{(7–5)}, 0–0^{r}

==== Senior gentlemen's invitation doubles ====
- (Australia) Todd Woodbridge / (Australia) Mark Woodforde def. (Netherlands) Jacco Eltingh / (Netherlands) Paul Haarhuis, 6–2, 7–5

=== Wheelchair events ===
==== Wheelchair gentlemen's singles ====
- (United Kingdom) Gordon Reid def. (Sweden) Stefan Olsson, 6–1, 6–4

==== Wheelchair ladies' singles ====
- (Netherlands) Jiske Griffioen def. (Netherlands) Aniek van Koot, 4–6, 6–0, 6–4

==== Wheelchair gentlemen's doubles ====
- (United Kingdom) Alfie Hewett / (United Kingdom) Gordon Reid def. (France) Stéphane Houdet / (France) Nicolas Peifer, 4–6, 6–1, 7–6^{(8–6)}

==== Wheelchair ladies' doubles ====
- (Japan) Yui Kamiji / (United Kingdom) Jordanne Whiley def. (Netherlands) Jiske Griffioen / (Netherlands) Aniek van Koot, 6–2, 6–2

== Withdrawals ==
The following players were accepted directly into the main tournament, but withdrew with injuries, suspensions or personal reasons.

Before the tournament

Men's singles

- ‡ (Spain) Tommy Robredo (74) → replaced by (Spain) Albert Montañés (97)
- ‡ (Australia) Thanasi Kokkinakis (81 PR) → replaced by (Portugal) Gastão Elias (98)
- ‡ (Spain) Rafael Nadal (5) → replaced by (Argentina) Facundo Bagnis (99)

Women's singles

- † (Italy) Flavia Pennetta (10) → replaced by (Czech Republic) Kateřina Siniaková (107)
- † (Russia) Maria Sharapova (24) → replaced by (United States) Shelby Rogers (108)
- ‡ (Japan) Naomi Osaka (102) → replaced by (United States) Anna Tatishvili (109)
- § (Belarus) Victoria Azarenka (5) → replaced by (China) Duan Yingying (LL)

† – not included on entry list
‡ – withdrew from entry list before qualifying began
§ – withdrew from entry list after qualifying began

During the tournament
Men's singles

- (Kazakhstan) Mikhail Kukushkin

== Retirements ==
Men's singles

- (France) Richard Gasquet
- (Japan) Kei Nishikori

Women's singles

- (Switzerland) Belinda Bencic
- (Russia) Margarita Gasparyan
- (United States) Anna Tatishvili

Preceded by 2016 French Open	Grand Slam Tournaments	Succeeded by 2016 US Open
Preceded by 2015 Wimbledon Championships	The Championships, Wimbledon	Succeeded by 2017 Wimbledon Championships
