= 2014 Charles Sturt Adelaide International – Singles =

Singles
- 2014 Charles Sturt Adelaide International

Final
- Champion: (United States) Bradley Klahn
- Runner-up: (Japan) Tatsuma Ito
- Score: 6–3, 7–6^{(11–9)}

Events
Singles	Doubles
- Charles Sturt Adelaide International

Matthew Barton was the defending champion, but lost in the quarterfinal to Hiroki Moriya.

Klaln won the title, defeating Tatsuma Ito in the final, 6–3, 7–6^{(11–9)}.

== Seeds ==
1. (United States) Bradley Klahn (champion)
2. (Australia) James Duckworth (semifinals, retired)
3. (Japan) Tatsuma Ito (final)
4. (Japan) Hiroki Moriya (semifinals)
5. (Australia) John-Patrick Smith (quarterfinals)
6. (Australia) Matt Reid (first round)
7. (Netherlands) Boy Westerhof (first round)
8. (Australia) Greg Jones (first round)

== Draw ==
Key

- Q = Qualifier
- WC = Wild card
- LL = Lucky loser
- Alt = Alternate
- ITF = ITF entry
- PR = Protected ranking
- SR = Special ranking
- SE = Special exempt
- JE = Junior exempt
- JR = Junior Accelerator Programme entrant
- CO = College Accelerator Programme entrant
- NG = Next Gen Accelerator Program entrant
- w/o = Walkover
- r = Retired
- d = Defaulted

=== Finals ===
Semifinals
1	(United States) Bradley Klahn	6	6
4	(Japan) Hiroki Moriya	3	4
3	(Japan) Tatsuma Ito	3
2	(Australia) James Duckworth	0^{r}

Final
1	(United States) Bradley Klahn	6	7^{11}
3	(Japan) Tatsuma Ito	3	6^{9}

=== Top half ===
First round
1	(United States) B Klahn	6	6
WC	(Australia) Jacob Grills	3	4
(Australia) B Mitchell	6	6
(Japan) Y Ito	1	3
(Japan) Shuichi Sekiguchi	3	4
(Australia) L Saville	6	6
(United States) M Krueger	0	2
5	(Australia) J-P Smith	6	6
4	(Japan) H Moriya	7^{7}	2	7^{7}
(Australia) A Bolt	6^{2}	6	6^{3}
Q	(Australia) R Agar	3	3
WC	(Australia) M Polmans	6	6
(New Zealand) J Statham	3	1
(Australia) M Barton	6	6
Q	(United Kingdom) C Norrie	6	6
6	(Australia) M Reid	3	4

Second round
1	(United States) B Klahn	4	6	6
(Australia) B Mitchell	6	3	4
(Australia) L Saville	6^{6}	1
5	(Australia) J-P Smith	7^{8}	6
4	(Japan) H Moriya	6	6
WC	(Australia) M Polmans	1	3
(Australia) M Barton	7	6
Q	(United Kingdom) C Norrie	5	4

Quarterfinals
1	(United States) B Klahn	6	7^{7}
5	(Australia) J-P Smith	3	6^{4}
4	(Japan) H Moriya	6	1	6
(Australia) M Barton	4	6	3

Semifinals
1	(United States) B Klahn	6	6
4	(Japan) H Moriya	3	4

=== Bottom half ===
First round
8	(Australia) G Jones	6^{5}	3
WC	(Australia) H Bourchier	7^{7}	6
(United Kingdom) B Klein	4	4
Q	(Australia) M Banes	6	6
(Russia) V Rudnev	6	7^{7}
(Australia) A Whittington	4	6^{3}
WC	(Australia) C O'Connell	7	6^{5}	1
3	(Japan) T Ito	5	7^{7}	6
7	(Netherlands) B Westerhof	2	5
(United States) J Jenkins	6	7
Q	(Australia) D Kelly	6	6
PR	(Czech Republic) R Vögeli	1	3
(Thailand) D Udomchoke	7^{8}	2	6
(Australia) D Propoggia	6^{6}	6	4
(Japan) T Matsui	6^{2}	6^{2}
2	(Australia) J Duckworth	7^{7}	7^{7}

Second round
WC	(Australia) H Bourchier	6^{2}	6^{4}
Q	(Australia) M Banes	7^{7}	7^{7}
(Russia) V Rudnev	2	4
3	(Japan) T Ito	6	6
(United States) J Jenkins	6	6
Q	(Australia) D Kelly	3	4
(Thailand) D Udomchoke	6^{2}	5
2	(Australia) J Duckworth	7^{7}	7

Quarterfinals
Q	(Australia) M Banes	1	2
3	(Japan) T Ito	6	6
(United States) J Jenkins	5	1
2	(Australia) J Duckworth	7	6

Semifinals
3	(Japan) T Ito	3
2	(Australia) J Duckworth	0^{r}
