= 2016 US Open – Men's singles qualifying =

Men's singles qualifying
- 2016 US Open

Events
Singles	men	women		boys	girls
Doubles	men	women	mixed	boys	girls
WC Singles	men	women	quad
WC Doubles	men	women	quad
Legends	men	women	mixed

Qualification
Singles	men	women
- US Open

== Seeds ==
1. (Japan) Yūichi Sugita (second round)
2. (Russia) Konstantin Kravchuk (second round)
3. (Russia) Karen Khachanov (qualified)
4. (Brazil) Thiago Monteiro (first round)
5. (Georgia (country)) Nikoloz Basilashvili (first round)
6. (Belgium) Steve Darcis (qualified)
7. (Argentina) Renzo Olivo (first round)
8. (Italy) Thomas Fabbiano (qualified)
9. (Czech Republic) Radek Štěpánek (qualified)
10. (United States) Tim Smyczek (second round)
11. (United States) Ryan Harrison (qualified)
12. (Brazil) João Souza (second round)
13. (United States) Dennis Novikov (second round)
14. (United States) Jared Donaldson (qualified)
15. (Slovakia) Jozef Kovalík (qualifying competition, lucky loser)
16. (Germany) Mischa Zverev (qualified)
17. (Argentina) Marco Trungelliti (first round)
18. (Colombia) Santiago Giraldo (qualifying competition)
19. (Argentina) Guido Andreozzi (qualified)
20. (Argentina) Nicolás Kicker (first round)
21. (Spain) Albert Montañés (second round)
22. (Germany) Tobias Kamke (qualifying competition)
23. (United States) Austin Krajicek (first round)
24. (Belgium) Arthur De Greef (first round)
25. (France) Quentin Halys (second round)
26. (India) Saketh Myneni (qualified)
27. (Switzerland) Marco Chiudinelli (qualified)
28. (Germany) Michael Berrer (second round)
29. (Argentina) Máximo González (second round)
30. (Japan) Go Soeda (second round)
31. (Slovenia) Grega Žemlja (first round)
32. (Netherlands) Thiemo de Bakker (second round)

== Qualifiers ==
1. (Italy) Alessandro Giannessi
2. (United States) Christian Harrison
3. (Russia) Karen Khachanov
4. (Argentina) Guido Andreozzi
5. (Czech Republic) Jan Šátral
6. (Belgium) Steve Darcis
7. (Hungary) Márton Fucsovics
8. (Italy) Thomas Fabbiano
9. (Czech Republic) Radek Štěpánek
10. (Brazil) Guilherme Clezar
11. (United States) Ryan Harrison
12. (Belarus) Ilya Ivashka
13. (India) Saketh Myneni
14. (United States) Jared Donaldson
15. (Switzerland) Marco Chiudinelli
16. (Germany) Mischa Zverev

== Lucky losers ==
1. (Slovakia) Jozef Kovalík
2. (Germany) Daniel Brands

== Draw ==
Key

- Q = Qualifier
- WC = Wild card
- LL = Lucky loser
- Alt = Alternate
- ITF = ITF entry
- PR = Protected ranking
- SR = Special ranking
- SE = Special exempt
- JE = Junior exempt
- JR = Junior Accelerator Programme entrant
- CO = College Accelerator Programme entrant
- NG = Next Gen Accelerator Program entrant
- w/o = Walkover
- r = Retired
- d = Defaulted

=== First qualifier ===
First round
1	(Japan) Yūichi Sugita	6	6
(France) Alexandre Sidorenko	2	3
(Italy) Alessandro Giannessi	7	6
(India) Ramkumar Ramanathan	5	1
(Kazakhstan) Dmitry Popko	6	6
(Japan) Hiroki Moriya	3	4
(Australia) John-Patrick Smith	2	5
22	(Germany) Tobias Kamke	6	7

Second round
1	(Japan) Yūichi Sugita	3	6	5
(Italy) Alessandro Giannessi	6	3	7
(Kazakhstan) Dmitry Popko	6	0	6^{4}
22	(Germany) Tobias Kamke	3	6	7^{7}

Qualifying competition
(Italy) Alessandro Giannessi	7	6
22	(Germany) Tobias Kamke	5	1

=== Second qualifier ===
First round
2	(Russia) Konstantin Kravchuk	6	6
(Italy) Stefano Napolitano	3	4
WC	(United States) Christian Harrison	4	6	7
(Australia) Luke Saville	6	0	5
(Netherlands) Antal van der Duim	1	0
(Canada) Steven Diez	6	6
PR	(Slovenia) Blaž Kavčič	7	7^{7}
23	(United States) Austin Krajicek	5	6^{2}

Second round
2	(Russia) Konstantin Kravchuk	6	6^{3}	0^{r}
WC	(United States) Christian Harrison	3	7^{7}	2
(Canada) Steven Diez	1	6	6
PR	(Slovenia) Blaž Kavčič	6	2	4

Qualifying competition
WC	(United States) Christian Harrison	1	6	6
(Canada) Steven Diez	6	4	2

=== Third qualifier ===
First round
3	(Russia) Karen Khachanov	6	6
(Bosnia and Herzegovina) Mirza Bašić	4	4
(Spain) Adrián Menéndez-Maceiras	2	6	7^{7}
(Russia) Aslan Karatsev	6	3	6^{3}
(China) Bai Yan	0^{r}
(United States) Noah Rubin	3
(United States) Stefan Kozlov	6	6^{5}	2
28	(Germany) Michael Berrer	2	7^{7}	6

Second round
3	(Russia) Karen Khachanov	6	6
(Spain) Adrián Menéndez-Maceiras	4	3
(United States) Noah Rubin	6	4	6
28	(Germany) Michael Berrer	2	6	4

Qualifying competition
3	(Russia) Karen Khachanov	6	4	6
(United States) Noah Rubin	3	6	4

=== Fourth qualifier ===
First round
4	(Brazil) Thiago Monteiro	4	6	6^{5}
(Germany) Daniel Brands	6	3	7^{7}
(Canada) Frank Dancevic	6	6
(Belgium) Ruben Bemelmans	4	3
PR	(Austria) Jürgen Melzer	7	6
WC	(United States) Tennys Sandgren	5	1
(Turkey) Marsel İlhan	3	1
19	(Argentina) Guido Andreozzi	6	6

Second round
(Germany) Daniel Brands	7	7^{7}
(Canada) Frank Dancevic	5	6^{5}
PR	(Austria) Jürgen Melzer	3	4
19	(Argentina) Guido Andreozzi	6	6

Qualifying competition
(Germany) Daniel Brands	6	2	1
19	(Argentina) Guido Andreozzi	4	6	6

=== Fifth qualifier ===
First round
5	(Georgia (country)) Nikoloz Basilashvili	7^{7}	2	6^{6}
(Australia) Matthew Barton	6^{3}	6	7^{8}
(Czech Republic) Jan Šátral	6	6
WC	(United States) Christopher Eubanks	1	3
(Kazakhstan) Aleksandr Nedovyesov	6	4	6
PR	(Croatia) Matija Pecotić	2	6	1
(Barbados) Darian King	4	6	6
31	(Slovenia) Grega Žemlja	6	4	4

Second round
(Australia) Matthew Barton	4	4
(Czech Republic) Jan Šátral	6	6
(Kazakhstan) Aleksandr Nedovyesov	6	5	6
(Barbados) Darian King	3	7	3

Qualifying competition
(Czech Republic) Jan Šátral	6	7
(Kazakhstan) Aleksandr Nedovyesov	3	5

=== Sixth qualifier ===
First round
6	(Belgium) Steve Darcis	6	6
(United States) Tommy Paul	3	2
WC	(New Zealand) Jose Statham	6^{3}	3
(South Korea) Lee Duck-hee	7^{7}	6
(France) Vincent Millot	3	6	6
(France) Mathias Bourgue	6	3	2
(Spain) Enrique López-Pérez	6	3	6
17	(Argentina) Marco Trungelliti	3	6	1

Second round
6	(Belgium) Steve Darcis	6	7^{7}
(South Korea) Lee Duck-hee	4	6^{3}
(France) Vincent Millot	7^{7}	1	4
(Spain) Enrique López-Pérez	6^{5}	6	6

Qualifying competition
6	(Belgium) Steve Darcis	6	4	7^{10}
(Spain) Enrique López-Pérez	3	6	6^{8}

=== Seventh qualifier ===
First round
7	(Argentina) Renzo Olivo	6^{5}	3
(Italy) Lorenzo Giustino	7^{7}	6
(China) Wu Di	6	4	6
(Spain) David Pérez Sanz	0	6	2
(Hungary) Márton Fucsovics	6	4	6
(Canada) Peter Polansky	2	6	2
(United Kingdom) James Ward	3	4
29	(Argentina) Máximo González	6	6

Second round
(Italy) Lorenzo Giustino	6	6
(China) Wu Di	2	4
(Hungary) Márton Fucsovics	3	6	6
29	(Argentina) Máximo González	6	1	0

Qualifying competition
(Italy) Lorenzo Giustino	6^{2}	1
(Hungary) Márton Fucsovics	7^{7}	6

=== Eighth qualifier ===
First round
8	(Italy) Thomas Fabbiano	1	6	6
(Italy) Andrea Arnaboldi	6	1	4
WC	(United States) Vasil Kirkov	2	5
(Belgium) Yannik Reuter	6	7
(Colombia) Alejandro González	6	6
(Italy) Luca Vanni	4	3
(Australia) Benjamin Mitchell	1	2
21	(Spain) Albert Montañés	6	6

Second round
8	(Italy) Thomas Fabbiano	6	6
(Belgium) Yannik Reuter	1	2
(Colombia) Alejandro González	6	6
21	(Spain) Albert Montañés	3	2

Qualifying competition
8	(Italy) Thomas Fabbiano	6	6^{1}	6
(Colombia) Alejandro González	3	7^{7}	3

=== Ninth qualifier ===
First round
9	(Czech Republic) Radek Štěpánek	6	6
(Croatia) Franko Škugor	1	1
(United States) Daniel Nguyen	3	2
(Israel) Amir Weintraub	6	6
(France) Constant Lestienne	6^{3}	3
(France) Axel Michon	7^{7}	6
(Romania) Marius Copil	6^{3}	3
30	(Japan) Go Soeda	7^{7}	6

Second round
9	(Czech Republic) Radek Štěpánek	6	7^{7}
(Israel) Amir Weintraub	2	6^{5}
(France) Axel Michon	6	6^{3}	6
30	(Japan) Go Soeda	2	7	4

Qualifying competition
9	(Czech Republic) Radek Štěpánek	6	6
(France) Axel Michon	4	3

=== Tenth qualifier ===
First round
10	(United States) Tim Smyczek	6	6
(Russia) Alexander Kudryavtsev	3	4
(Argentina) Facundo Argüello	2	3
(Brazil) Guilherme Clezar	6	6
(France) Grégoire Barrère	4	2
(United States) Alexander Sarkissian	6	6
(Belarus) Egor Gerasimov	1	3
25	(France) Quentin Halys	6	6

Second round
10	(United States) Tim Smyczek	6^{4}	3
(Brazil) Guilherme Clezar	7^{7}	6
(United States) Alexander Sarkissian	7^{7}	6
25	(France) Quentin Halys	6^{1}	2

Qualifying competition
(Brazil) Guilherme Clezar	6	7
(United States) Alexander Sarkissian	4	6^{5}

=== Eleventh qualifier ===
First round
11	(United States) Ryan Harrison	7^{7}	6
PR	(Germany) Cedrik-Marcel Stebe	6^{1}	3
(Bosnia and Herzegovina) Aldin Šetkić	4	4
(Belgium) Joris De Loore	6	6
(Switzerland) Henri Laaksonen	2	6	6
WC	(United States) Thai-Son Kwiatkowski	6	1	4
(Serbia) Laslo Đere	6	6
24	(Belgium) Arthur De Greef	4	2

Second round
11	(United States) Ryan Harrison	7^{7}	6
(Belgium) Joris De Loore	6^{5}	4
(Switzerland) Henri Laaksonen	3	6	6
(Serbia) Laslo Đere	6	3	4

Qualifying competition
11	(United States) Ryan Harrison	6	6
(Switzerland) Henri Laaksonen	3	2

=== Twelfth qualifier ===
First round
12	(Brazil) João Souza	6	6
(Australia) Andrew Whittington	4	4
(Portugal) Pedro Sousa	2	3
PR	(Germany) Matthias Bachinger	6	6
(Belgium) Kimmer Coppejans	6	4	1
WC	(United States) Ryan Shane	2	6	6
(Belarus) Ilya Ivashka	6	6
20	(Argentina) Nicolás Kicker	3	2

Second round
12	(Brazil) João Souza	6	6^{5}	6^{6}
PR	(Germany) Matthias Bachinger	4	7^{7}	7^{8}
WC	(United States) Ryan Shane	3	3
(Belarus) Ilya Ivashka	6	6

Qualifying competition
PR	(Germany) Matthias Bachinger	4	3
(Belarus) Ilya Ivashka	6	6

=== Thirteenth qualifier ===
First round
13	(United States) Dennis Novikov	7^{10}	5	6
(Italy) Federico Gaio	6^{8}	7	2
(Russia) Daniil Medvedev	6^{5}	6^{2}
(Serbia) Peđa Krstin	7^{7}	7^{7}
(Serbia) Nikola Milojević	1	6	3
(United States) Mitchell Krueger	6	3	6
PR	(France) Albano Olivetti	3	5
26	(India) Saketh Myneni	6	7

Second round
13	(United States) Dennis Novikov	6^{0}	5
(Serbia) Peđa Krstin	7^{7}	7
(United States) Mitchell Krueger	6^{6}	4
26	(India) Saketh Myneni	7^{8}	6

Qualifying competition
(Serbia) Peđa Krstin	3	0
26	(India) Saketh Myneni	6	6

=== Fourteenth qualifier ===
First round
14	(United States) Jared Donaldson	6	6
(Colombia) Eduardo Struvay	3	4
(Spain) Pere Riba	6	4	4
(Spain) Jordi Samper-Montaña	2	6	6
WC	(United States) Reilly Opelka	3	6	6
(France) Édouard Roger-Vasselin	6	4	3
(El Salvador) Marcelo Arévalo	6^{4}	6^{5}
18	(Colombia) Santiago Giraldo	7^{7}	7^{7}

Second round
14	(United States) Jared Donaldson	6	7^{7}
(Spain) Jordi Samper-Montaña	1	6^{1}
WC	(United States) Reilly Opelka	6	1	0^{r}
18	(Colombia) Santiago Giraldo	4	6	2

Qualifying competition
14	(United States) Jared Donaldson	6	6
18	(Colombia) Santiago Giraldo	2	2

=== Fifteenth qualifier ===
First round
15	(Slovakia) Jozef Kovalík	3	7^{7}	6
(Australia) Sam Groth	6	6^{3}	3
(Serbia) Marko Tepavac	7^{7}	6^{0}	6
(Germany) Peter Gojowczyk	6^{2}	7^{7}	3
(France) Tristan Lamasine	6	6
(Estonia) Jürgen Zopp	4	4
(Slovenia) Blaž Rola	7^{7}	2	3
27	(Switzerland) Marco Chiudinelli	6^{1}	6	6

Second round
15	(Slovakia) Jozef Kovalík	6	6
(Serbia) Marko Tepavac	1	3
(France) Tristan Lamasine	4	6	6^{3}
27	(Switzerland) Marco Chiudinelli	6	3	7^{7}

Qualifying competition
15	(Slovakia) Jozef Kovalík	6^{5}	5
27	(Switzerland) Marco Chiudinelli	7^{7}	7

=== Sixteenth qualifier ===
First round
16	(Germany) Mischa Zverev	6	3	6
(Kazakhstan) Andrey Golubev	3	6	1
(Russia) Andrey Rublev	7^{7}	6^{5}	4
(Serbia) Miljan Zekić	6^{4}	7^{7}	6
WC	(United States) Sekou Bangoura	6	6
(Chile) Gonzalo Lama	2	1
(Austria) Dennis Novak	1	3
32	(Netherlands) Thiemo de Bakker	6	6

Second round
16	(Germany) Mischa Zverev	6	6
(Serbia) Miljan Zekić	2	1
WC	(United States) Sekou Bangoura	6	6
32	(Netherlands) Thiemo de Bakker	2	3

Qualifying competition
16	(Germany) Mischa Zverev	6	6
WC	(United States) Sekou Bangoura	4	2
