= 2014 Charles Sturt Adelaide International =

- Date: 3–9 February
- Edition: 2nd
- Draw: 32S / 16D
- Prize money: $50,000
- Surface: Hard
- Location: West Lakes, Australia

Champions

Singles
- (United States) Bradley Klahn

Doubles
- (New Zealand) Marcus Daniell / (United States) Jarmere Jenkins
- Charles Sturt Adelaide International

The 2014 Charles Sturt Adelaide International was a professional tennis tournament played on hard courts. It was the second edition of the tournament which was part of the 2014 ATP Challenger Tour. It took place in West Lakes, Australia between 3 and 9 February 2014.

== Singles main-draw entrants ==
=== Seeds ===
Country	Player	Rank^{1}	Seed
USA	Bradley Klahn	93	1
AUS	James Duckworth	132	2
JPN	Tatsuma Ito	156	3
JPN	Hiroki Moriya	204	4
AUS	Matt Reid	227	5
AUS	John-Patrick Smith	229	6
NED	Boy Westerhof	240	7
AUS	Greg Jones	259	8

- ^{1} Rankings as of 13 January 2014

=== Other entrants ===
The following players received wildcards into the singles main draw:

- (Australia) Harry Bourchier
- (Australia) Jacob Grills
- (Australia) Christopher O'Connell
- (Australia) Marc Polmans

The following players used Protected Ranking to gain entry into the singles main draw:

- (Czech Republic) Roman Vögeli

The following players received entry from the qualifying draw:

- (Australia) Ryan Agar
- (United Kingdom) Cameron Norrie
- (Australia) Maverick Banes
- (Australia) Dayne Kelly

== Champions ==
=== Singles ===
- (United States) Bradley Klahn def. (Japan) Tatsuma Ito, 6–3, 7–6^{(11–9)}

=== Doubles ===
- (New Zealand) Marcus Daniell / (United States) Jarmere Jenkins def. (Australia) Dane Propoggia / (New Zealand) Jose Rubin Statham, 6–4, 6–4
