= James Ward (tennis) =

British tennis player (born 1987)

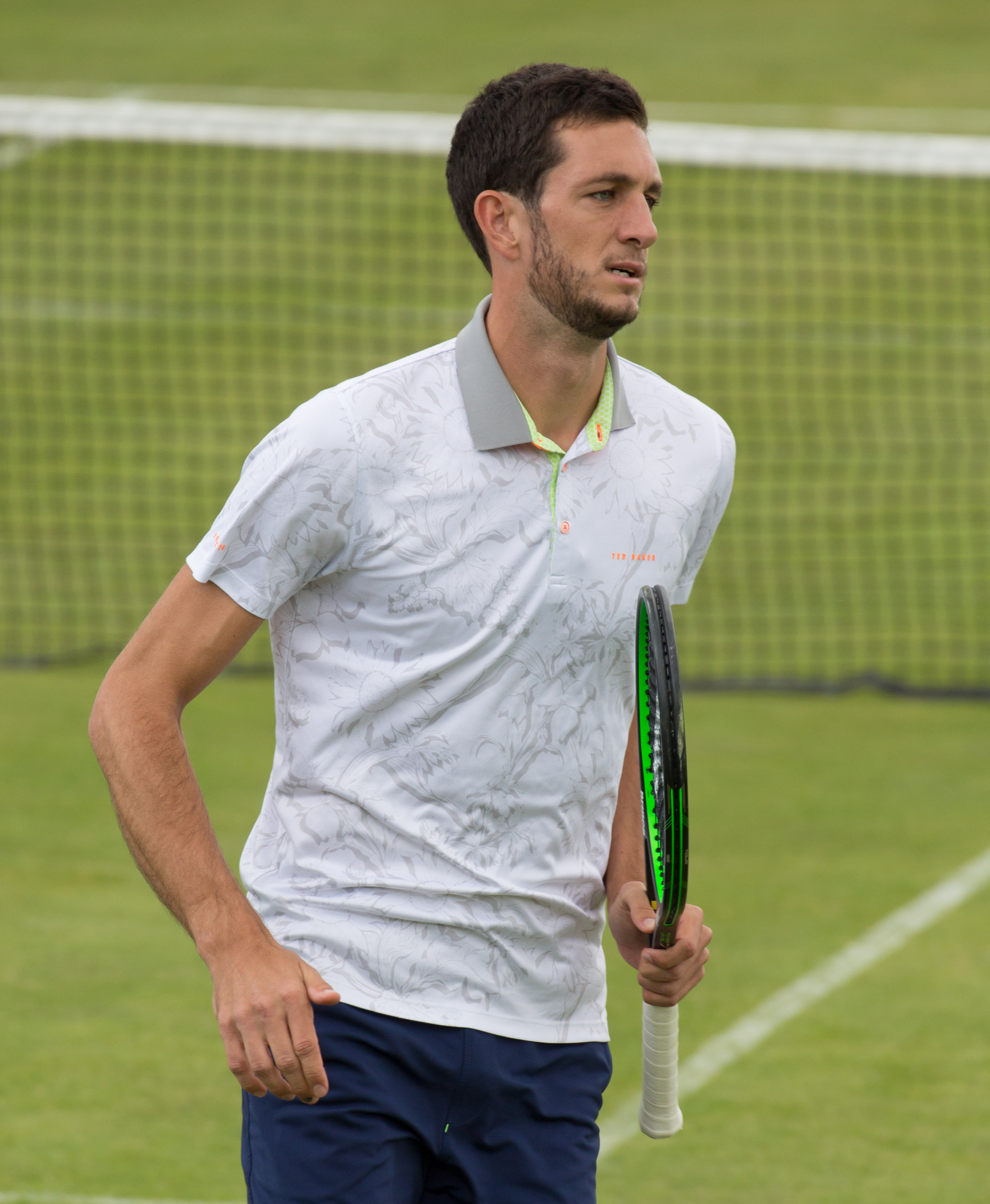
- Full name: James Ward
- Country (sports): (United Kingdom) Great Britain England
- Residence: London, England
- Born: 9 February 1987 (age 39) London, England
- Height: 6 ft 3 in (1.91 m)
- Turned pro: 2006
- Retired: 2021
- Plays: Right-handed (two-handed backhand)
- Coach: Toni Colom (2007); Greg Rusedski; Tomislav Perić (2010–2011); Darren Tandy (2014–2015); Morgan Phillips (2016)
- Prize money: $1,544,846

Singles
- Career record: 25–61
- Career titles: 0
- Highest ranking: No. 89 (13 July 2015)

Grand Slam singles results
- Australian Open: 1R (2012, 2015)
- French Open: 1R (2014)
- Wimbledon: 3R (2015)
- US Open: 1R (2015)

Doubles
- Career record: 2–16
- Career titles: 0
- Highest ranking: No. 233 (29 August 2011)

Grand Slam doubles results
- Wimbledon: 2R (2009)

Team competitions
- Davis Cup: W (2015)
- Last updated on: 18 September 2021.

James Ward (born 9 February 1987) is a British former professional tennis player. He is a Davis Cup champion and former British No. 2.

He reached the quarterfinals of the 2010 Aegon International and the semifinals of the 2011 Aegon Championships as a wildcard entry. His best Grand Slam performance to date was reaching the third round of Wimbledon in 2015.

In February 2009, Ward played what was then, the longest tennis match in history, lasting 6 hrs 40 mins, eventually losing to Chris Eaton. This was a play-off match to decide the Davis Cup team, but it was not sanctioned by the ATP so was not an official record, and it was broken later.

Ward was part of the Great Britain team that won the Davis Cup in 2015, the nation's first success in the tournament for 79 years. He played in wins against the United States and France in the first round and quarterfinals, which included a crucial singles victory over US' John Isner to give Britain a 2–0 lead. Ward was also named in the team for the Davis Cup final, and the Davis Cup team won the 2015 BBC Sports Personality Team of the Year Award.

== Early and personal life ==
Ward is the son of Jim Ward, a London black cab taxi driver. Ward started playing tennis at around 10 because his father played some social tennis every weekend at Temple Fortune Club in Hendon. Ward also played football, but chose tennis. The club didn't have a junior programme and because coaches costs money, Ward only played once a week. Ward would often be found at the Islington Tennis Centre in Market Road. During his early teenage years Ward was coached by Daren Quilty, Head Pro at Oakleigh Park Tennis Club in Whetstone, culminating in him reaching the semifinals of the Under-15s national championships.

After finishing his GCSEs at the age of 16, his entire family relocated to Spain so that Ward could attend the Equelite Juan Carlos Ferrero Academy near Valencia for four years, where he practised with former French Open champion Juan Carlos Ferrero. In 2007, Ward's father fell ill, causing a downturn in their finances, but the academy allowed Ward to stay.

Ward enjoys playing on clay more than any other surface and currently trains in London.

Ward is famous for wearing colourful tennis shirts, after forming a bond with London designer Ted Baker, otherwise known as Ray Kelvin.

Ward is a fan of Arsenal F.C. At one time, Ward was so strapped for cash he had to sell his Gunners season ticket to help pay for his tennis career.

== Career ==
He made his first tour appearance in Valencia in 2007 as a wild card but lost in the first round.

Ward qualified for only his second ATP tour event, the 2008 Stella Artois Championships at the Queen's Club in London. In the first round on 9 June he met former US Open and Australian Open champion, Russian player Marat Safin. Ward took the first set after breaking Safin in the third game of the match and managed to hold his serve for the rest of the set to take it 6–4. However Safin upped his game in the second set, gained an early break and won the set comfortably 6–1. Ward was also broken early in the deciding set losing 6–4, 1–6, 4–6.

=== 2009 ===
In February, Davis Cup captain John Lloyd selected six Britons for a play-off contest, to find two singles players for the Ukraine tie. In these, Ward competed in a then longest match in tennis history, lasting 6 hours and 40 minutes, against Chris Eaton on 25 February. Eaton won the match 6–3, 6–2, 6–7, 2–6, 21–19, but it was not sanctioned by the ATP so was not an official record. It was exceeded later by the Isner-Mahut match at the 2010 Wimbledon Championships. This was the second time that Ward had played a five set match – the first occasion had been the previous Monday also at the play-offs.

In May, he became the first British player to win a challenger title on clay since Tim Henman in 1995. He beat Carsten Ball in the final of the Sarasota Open in Florida, USA. This win propelled him into the top 250 of the ATP's rankings, establishing himself as British No. 2.

In September, Ward was struck with glandular fever, and dropped to British No. 3.

=== 2010 ===
In March, Ward made his Davis Cup debut in the Europe/Africa Zone Group II tie vs Lithuania, in Vilnius, with Dan Evans, Ken Skupski, and Colin Fleming. The Lithuanian side entered the tie as underdogs; fielding a team of teenagers. Ward beat Lithuanian No. 2 Laurynas Grigelis and became the first Briton other than Tim Henman, Greg Rusedski, or Andy Murray to win a live rubber since Andrew Richardson beat Zimbabwe's Byron Black in 1997. Evans lost the second singles match, Fleming and Skupski won their doubles, but Ward and Evans were both beaten on the final day. This was described as a humiliating Davis Cup defeat for Great Britain and led to the resignation of Davis Cup captain John Lloyd. Britain was then threatened with relegation to the third tier of the competition.

Tommy Peric became Ward's coach.

In June 2010, Ward reached his first ATP World Tour quarterfinal at the Aegon International, Eastbourne, UK. Ward beat second seed Feliciano López (who had beaten Rafael Nadal the week before) when López had to retire. He followed it up with a victory over the other man to lose at the semifinals of Queens the week before, Rainer Schüttler. He was eventually beaten by the young Ukrainian talent Alexandr Dolgopolov in straight sets.

The new Davis Cup captain Leon Smith selected Ward to take part in Great Britain's vital Davis Cup tie vs Turkey at Eastbourne in July alongside Jamie Baker, Ken Skupski, Colin Fleming, and Alex Ward (non-player). Defeat would have meant Great Britain's relegation to Europe Zone Group III. Ward contributed to the victory by winning both his singles matches, Britain eventually winning 5–0, and giving Great Britain a first Davis Cup win in three years.

At the Delhi Commonwealth Games in October, Ward became the first Englishman to play tennis in a Commonwealth Games. Seeded fourth in the singles, he beat Jamie Murray in the second round to reach the quarterfinals.

=== 2011 ===
Ward lost at the first hurdle in six of his seven tournaments at the beginning of this year. So when Leon Smith, Britain's Davis Cup captain selected his team for the Euro/Africa Zone Group II tie against Tunisia in March, he sprang a surprise, omitting Alex Bogdanovic, having recalled the 26-year-old to the squad after a three-year absence. Instead, Smith's singles players were Ward (No. 214) and Jamie Baker (No. 406), who had lost first time out in his last two events. Although Bogdanovic (No. 374) had lost all six of his live Davis Cup rubbers, he had at least won a Futures tournament in the United States that year. Ward played a key role in Great Britain's 4–1 victory, winning both his live singles rubbers, and ultimately clinching the tie by beating Malek Jaziri 3–6, 6–3, 3–6, 6–3, 8–6 in the fourth rubber.

At the Queen's Club Championships, Ward reached the semifinals of an ATP tour event for the first time. He defeated fourth seed and future Grand Slam champion Stanislas Wawrinka in straight sets in the second round. Ward followed this up by defeating defending champion and 13th seed Sam Querrey, coming from a set down to win in three sets to equal his run at Eastbourne in 2010. Ward then defeated Adrian Mannarino in three sets, despite missing seven match points in the second-set tiebreaker. He was eventually defeated by Jo Wilfried Tsonga, having held a set point in the second-set tiebreaker. This was the first time two British players had reached this stage since the Open era began in 1968, the other man being Andy Murray.

At Wimbledon Ward entered as a wildcard, but lost in the first round to Michaël Llodra.

In July, Ward took part in the Davis Cup Luxembourg tie. Ward could not make good a ranking deficit of 106 places against world No. 81 Gilles Müller, and he lost the first rubber. Great Britain won 4–1, with Ward winning the dead rubber against unranked Laurent Bram, a full-time coach who played competitively when he could.

Following a short break, Ward's first tournament back was the Lexington Challenger. As top seed, Ward reached the final, losing to Wayne Odesnik. He was also runner-up in the doubles tournament. Two weeks later, Ward won the second Challenger tournament of his career at the 2011 Odlum Brown Vancouver Open, defeating Robby Ginepri. The win saw Ward rise to world No. 144. On 15 August ward rose to a career-high ranking of No. 140.

In September, Ward was selected for the Davis Cup promotion tie against Hungary. In the first rubber, Ward had a sometimes dramatic win over the visitors' No. 1 Attila Balázs. The drama came not so much from any searing quality of tennis, but from Ward's constant battle with cramping in his leg and queasiness that meant he had to nip backstage mid-match to empty the contents of his stomach. Ward had occasionally looked likely to default against an opponent ranked No. 262 in the world. With Andy Murray, Colin Fleming, and Ross Hutchins winning, Great Britain claimed a decisive 3–0 lead, and was promoted into Europe/Africa Zone Group I.

=== 2012 ===
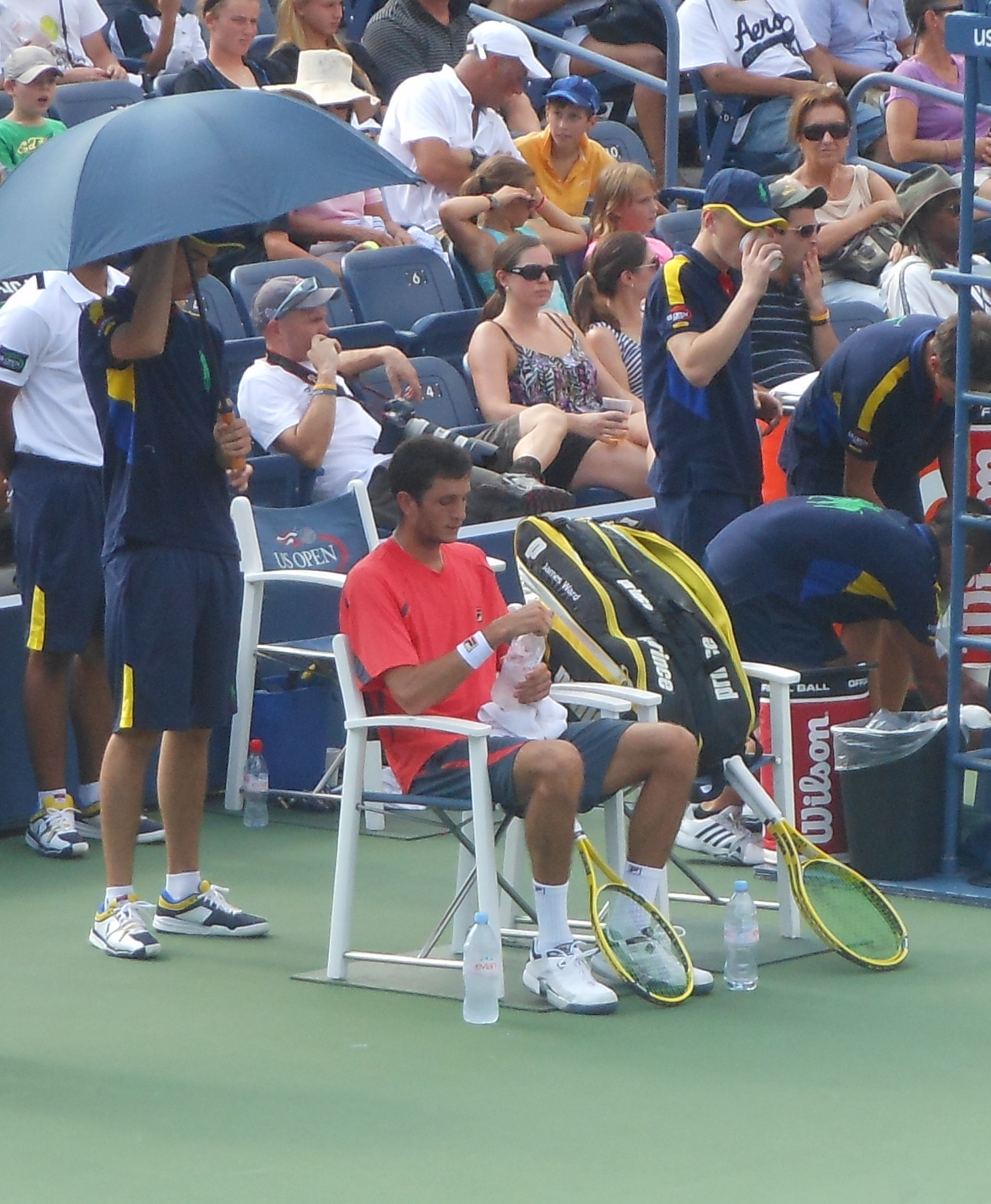
Ward at the 2012 US Open

Ward qualified for his first Grand Slam other than Wimbledon, but lost in the first round of the Australian Open to Slovenian Blaž Kavčič.

In February, Ward participated in the Davis Cup Europe/Africa Zone Group I tie against Slovakia. Though he lost his singles rubbers, Great Britain won 3–2.

Ward suffered from a back injury and was unable to play in the Davis Cup tie against Belgium.

On 30 April, Ward reached a career-high ranking in singles of No. 137.

Entering Wimbledon on a wild card, Ward won his first match at a Grand Slam, coming through a grueling five-set match to defeat the World no. 36 Pablo Andújar. He won the final six games after trailing in the final set 0–3. In the second round on Court No 1, Ward narrowly lost to World no 12 Mardy Fish in another tough five-setter, and received a standing ovation.

Ward had recently sold his £1300 Arsenal F.C. season ticket to fund his tennis, so he had some regrets after earning £23,125 for winning his first round Wimbledon match.

In July, Ward fell over in Newport practising, breaking his wrist, and putting him out for six months. His ranking fell from No. 140 to No. 280.

In December, the Lawn Tennis Association announced that Ward was the only player in Britain's top nine men to be funded for the following season.

=== 2013 ===
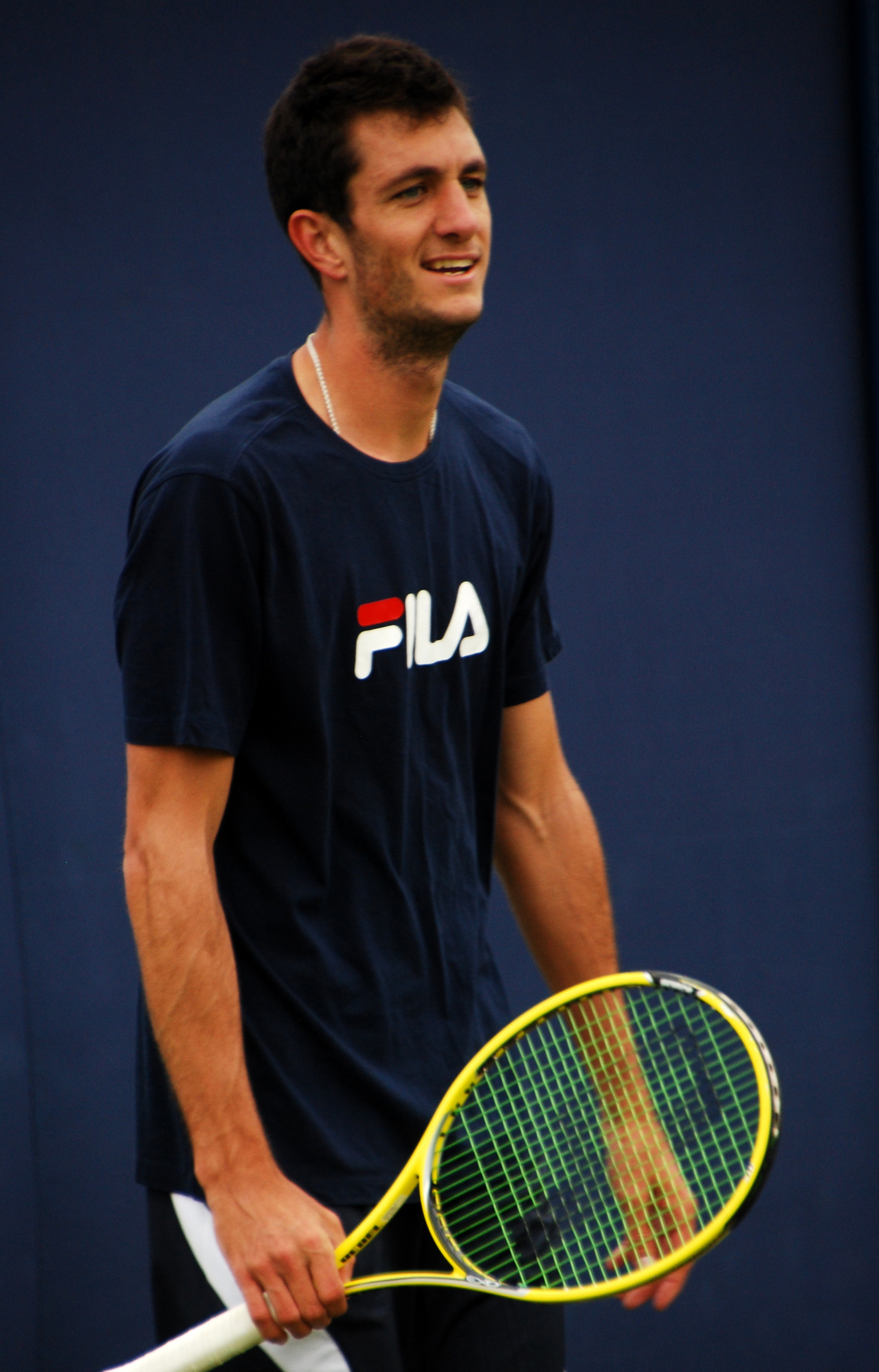
Ward at the 2013 Queen's Club Championships

In January 2013, Ward failed to qualify for the Australian Open, reaching the third round of qualifying before losing to Julian Reister. Ward remained in Australia to compete in the Charles Sturt Adelaide International, where he reached the final, defeating top seed Yūichi Sugita along the way, before losing to home favourite Matthew Barton.

Ward was then selected for Great Britain's Davis Cup team for their Europe/Africa Zone Group I match against Russia in Coventry. Ward lost an epic first rubber to Evgeny Donskoy to give Russia a 2–0 lead heading into the doubles rubber the following day. The doubles pairing of Jonny Marray and Colin Fleming gave the home side some hope going into the final day of matches, where Ward opened the day. Ward stunned the much higher seeded Russian Dmitry Tursunov to level the tie. Dan Evans would eventually complete a remarkable turnaround, with a straight-set victory over Donskoy. The last time Great Britain had come from 2–0 down to win a Davis Cup tie was 83 years ago against Germany, Consequently, Great Britain won a place in the 16-team World Group play-offs in September. Ward had to be placed on a drip to help him recover from his efforts. The following Monday afternoon, Ward was not feeling well so he was again put on a drip.

Ward kicked off his clay season in China, where he qualified for the An-Ning ATP $50,000 Challenger event and reached the final. His route to the final included a victory over fourth seed Josselin Ouanna. He lost to Hungarian Márton Fucsovics in the final.

Ward's first grass tournament was the annual event at Queen's Club, where he lost in the first round to Ivan Dodig, despite having two match points on serve in the second set.

In July, Ward won his third Challenger title at Lexington, USA.

In November, the Lawn Tennis Association announced a dramatic cut in elite player funding, with all financial support being withdrawn from Britain's doubles specialists and any singles players aged over 24, such as Ward, to reduce the number of supported players from 16 to just six in 2014.

Andy Murray asked Ward to stay at his training camp in Miami for December, but Ward made a last-minute decision to stay home.

=== 2014 ===
Ward started 2014 in Brisbane, competing in the Brisbane International, losing in the second round of qualifying to Marius Copil in three sets. Ward then went on to the Australian Open, where he disappointingly lost in the first round of qualifying to Andrea Arnaboldi. Soon after, Ward competed in the Maui Challenger, a common tournament for those who failed to make the Australian Open main draw. However, Ward once again lost disappointingly in the first round against Denis Kudla.

In late January, Ward was called to the Great British Davis Cup squad for the World Group first round tie against the United States in San Diego and was chosen to play the second rubber against world No. 49 Sam Querrey. Ward was two games from defeat in the fourth set before producing a remarkable comeback to beat Querrey in five sets and increase Great Britain's lead to 2–0. Ward agreed that it was the greatest win of his career. Great Britain would later go on to win the tie 3–1, with Andy Murray securing two victories; Ward was scheduled to play the final rubber against Donald Young but both teams decided not to play.

Ward entered the Open BNP Paribas Banque de Bretagne as a sixth seed. However, he lost in the first round of 32 against Maxime Authom. Moving on to the Open 13, Ward entered qualifying and fought his way to the third and final round. However, he lost to Ričardas Berankis, ending his progress in the tournament. He had more success in the Dubai Tennis Championships, entering as a wild card into the main draw. In the first round of 32, Ward beat Teymuraz Gabashvili in three sets in order to advance to the second round of 16. There, he lost to sixth seed, Mikhail Youzhny, earning nearly $25,000 in the progress. Ward also entered the Qualifying tournament at the BNP Paribas Open. At Indian Wells, Ward progressed to the second Qualifying Round, but lost to Paul-Henri Mathieu in straight sets. However, taking advantage of the withdrawal, Ward received a wild card into the main draw in place of the sixth seed Juan Martín del Potro, thus earning a Bye in the first round of 128. Despite losing in the Round of 64 to Feliciano López, Ward once again earned around $16,000.

Entering the Visit Panamá Cup main draw directly, Ward lost to Gastão Elias in the first round. Moving on, Ward was once again called into the Davis Cup squad, to compete against Italy. Ward competed in two live rubbers in the tie, losing hard-fought battles against both Fabio Fognini and Andreas Seppi. Due to Fognini's win over Andy Murray, Italy won the tie 3–2.

Ward qualified for the French Open for the first time thanks to victories over Moldovan Radu Albot in the first round of qualifying, and over American Ryan Harrison in the second. He followed this up with a tense victory over Slovenian Blaz Rola in the final round. By doing so, Ward became the first British player to progress through qualifying for the French Open since John Lloyd in 1973. He eventually lost in the main draw first round to Radu Albot.

In December, Ward and Kyle Edmund trained with Andy Murray at his training camp in Miami for two and a half weeks.

=== 2015: Davis Cup Champion ===
In January, Ward joined Andy Murray's training camp in Dubai.

Ward played at the invitational Kooyong Classic in Melbourne, beating American No 1 John Isner 3–6, 7–6, 6–2 in an exhibition match.

At the Australian Open, Ward was named as the sixth alternate on the main entry list. but a number of withdrawals meant that Ward joined the main draw and did not need to qualify. Ward became the first British male singles player other than Andy Murray to earn direct entry into a Grand Slam since Tim Henman at the 2007 US Open. Ward played 31st seed Fernando Verdasco in the first round, losing 2–6 6–0 7–6 (8–6) 6–3.

In March, Ward was selected for the Davis Cup first round tie against the United States in Glasgow, pulling off the biggest win of his career. Ward, ranked 111 in the world, came from two sets down to beat 20th-ranked John Isner 6–7 (5–7) 5–7 6–3 7–6 (7–3) 15–13 in a match which surpassed the five-hour mark, to set Great Britain on their way to victory. The last time Great Britain won back-to-back Davis Cup matches against the US, was 80 years ago.

Ward made it into the third round of Wimbledon for the first time, where he was knocked out by Vasek Pospisil 4–6 6–3 6–2 3–6 6–8. Along with Andy Murray, there were two British men in the third round for the first time since 2002. After Wimbledon, he was ranked in the top 100 players for the first time, reaching a career-high ranking of 89. He was also part of the team for the Davis Cup quarter final against France. Ward lost to Gilles Simon, the world No 11, but Great Britain won 3–1 to qualify for the Davis Cup semi-final.

Since Wimbledon, Ward suffered nine successive defeats, but was announced for the Davis Cup team in the semi-final against Australia in Glasgow. The Davis Cup captain, Leon Smith, eventually made the surprise decision to give the 300 ranked Dan Evans the second singles position along with Andy Murray. Though Dan Evans lost his rubber, Great Britain won 3–2 and reached the Davis Cup Final for the first time since 1978.

In October, Ward won his fourth Challenger title in Bangalore, defeating top seed Adrian Menendez-Maceiras 6–2, 7–5 to clinch his first title on the Challenger Tour since July 2013. After a disastrous loss of form during the summer, Ward had been under threat of dropping outside the world's top 200 by the end of the year, but his success ensured a ranking of 143. Ward then made it an eight match winning streak by reaching the semi-finals of the Pune Challenger. This success led to Ward being made the Aegon Player of the Month for October.

Davis Cup Captain Leon Smith supervised Ward and Kyle Edmund, accompanying them to South America to help him decide on his second singles player for the Davis Cup Final. In November, the 20-year-old Edmund won the Copa Fila Challenge title in Argentina on clay beating Brazil's Carlos Berlocq, ranked No 112 in the world and an expert on the red stuff. Ward lost in the second round of the same event, though Ward, ranked 156, had won the hard court Bangalore Challenger. On the same day as Edmund's victory, Dan Evans, ranked 271, won the Knoxville Challenger on a hard court, but with Belgium opting to stage the tie on an indoor clay court, Smith chose to go with the British number two Edmund, now ranked 100, as his second singles player.

Ward, Kyle Edmund, Jamie Murray and Andy Murray were chosen for the 2015 Davis Cup Final versus Belgium in Ghent. Edmund made his Davis Cup debut in the 2015 final playing the first singles match against Belgian Number 1 David Goffin, ranked No 16, but lost 6–3, 6–1, 2–6, 1–6, 0–6. There were suggestions that Smith would replace Edmund with the more experienced Ward if the final was locked at 2–2 on Sunday, yet Smith indicated that he could stick with Edmund. Great Britain went on to lead 3–1, and win the Davis Cup for the first time since 1936.

After returning home, Ward revealed that his coach, Australian Darren Tandy, was seriously ill with cancer and that had brought an end to their working relationship. Tandy received an initial diagnosis of colon cancer during the post-Wimbledon tournaments in America, and suffered a stroke while they were together at the US Open together. Ward said 'I am not using it as an excuse for what happened after Wimbledon but obviously it did not help. The most important thing is Darren's health and it has been an upsetting and worrying situation.'

On 4 December, Ward booked his first practice session with his new coach Morgan Phillips, a former British player from Croydon, and one of his best friends.

Ward joined the rest of the Davis Cup team at the BBC Sports Personality of the Year Show, where they won the 2015 Team of the Year Award.

=== 2016 ===
Ward's best results this year were quarter final appearances at the Tallahassee Challenger and the Manchester Challenger

Ward failed to qualify for the Australian Open, French Open and US Open, and was beaten in the first or second round of two ATP and nine Challenger tournaments, plus five ATP Qualifiers. Ward had to cope with recurring tendonitis in his right knee, and the death of his coach.

Entering Wimbledon on a wildcard, Ward's first round match was against world no 1 Novak Djokovic on Centre Court. Initially losing 0–6, 0–3, whilst not winning a single point in the first set, Ward came back to take the second set to a tie-break, but was eventually beaten 0–6, 6–7, 4–6.

After Wimbledon, Ward was due to play an ATP qualifier, but six hours before his flight to the US, he was called up for the Davis Cup quarter final against Serbia in Belgrade, to cover the absence of Andy Murray, and Dan Evans who had a shoulder problem and some problems at home. Persistent rain during Kyle Edmund's successful match meant that Ward had to play the second singles on Saturday. Dušan Lajović, world no 81 and the Serbian number one in the absence of Novak Djokovic and Viktor Troicki beat Ward heavily in a straight sets victory to make it 1-1. With Jamie Murray and Dominic Inglot winning the doubles and Kyle Edmund victorious over Dusan Lajovic, Great Britain won 3–1 to progress to the Davis Cup semi final.

Ward's last match of the year was in September at the St Petersburg Open first round qualifier.

His ranking fell from 156 in January to 444 by the end of the year.

=== 2017 ===
After an eight-month absence due to a knee problem, Ward returned in June for the British grass court season, but lost five first round matches, including Wimbledon where he had received a wild card.

=== 2021: Retirement ===
Ward announced his retirement from professional tennis on 17 December 2021.

== Performance timelines ==
Key
W	F	SF	QF	#R	RR	Q#	DNQ	A	NH

(W) winner; (F) finalist; (SF) semifinalist; (QF) quarterfinalist; (#R) rounds 4, 3, 2, 1; (RR) round-robin stage; (Q#) qualification round; (DNQ) did not qualify; (A) absent; (NH) not held; (SR) strike rate (events won / competed); (W–L) win–loss record.
To avoid confusion and double counting, these charts are updated at the conclusion of a tournament or when the player's participation has ended.

=== Singles ===
Tournament	2007	2008	2009	2010	2011	2012	2013	2014	2015	2016	2017	2018	2019	2020	2021	SR	W–L
Grand Slam tournaments
Australian Open	A	A	Q1	Q2	Q1	1R	Q3	Q1	1R	Q2	A	A	Q2	A	A	0 / 2	0–2
French Open	A	A	A	Q1	Q1	Q1	A	1R	Q2	Q1	A	A	Q1	A	A	0 / 1	0–1
Wimbledon	Q1	A	1R	A	1R	2R	1R	1R	3R	1R	1R	Q3	1R	NH	A	0 / 9	3–9
US Open	A	A	Q1	A	Q1	Q1	Q3	Q3	1R	Q1	A	A	Q2	A	A	0 / 1	0–1
Win–loss	0–0	0–0	0–1	0–0	0–1	1–2	0–1	0–2	2–3	0–1	0–1	0–0	0–1	0–0	0–0	0 / 13	3–13
National representation
Davis Cup	A	A	A	Z2	Z2	Z1	PO	QF	W	SF	A	A	A	NH	A	1 / 3	10–11
Career statistics
Tournaments	1	2	3	4	4	4	3	10	10	3	2	0	3	0	1	50	
Overall win–loss	0–1	0–2	1–3	5–5	8–5	1–6	1–4	5–12	4–12	0–5	0–2	0–0	0–3	0–0	0–1	25–61	
Year-end ranking	558	280	270	201	162	250	161	107	156	444	843	186	318	291	391	29%	

=== Doubles ===
Tournament	2007	2008	2009	2010	2011	2012	2013	2014	2015	2016	2017	2018	2019	2020	2021	SR	W–L
Grand Slam tournaments
Australian Open	A	A	A	A	A	A	A	A	A	A	A	A	A	A	A	0 / 0	0–0
French Open	A	A	A	A	A	A	A	A	A	A	A	A	A	A	A	0 / 0	0–0
Wimbledon	Q1	A	2R	A	1R	1R	A	1R	1R	1R	A	A	1R	NH	1R	0 / 8	1–8
US Open	A	A	A	A	A	A	A	A	A	A	A	A	A	A	A	0 / 0	0–0
Win–loss	0–0	0–0	1–1	0–0	0–1	0–1	0–0	0–1	0–1	0–1	0–0	0–0	0–1	0–0	0–1	0 / 8	1–8

== ATP Challengers and ITF Futures finals ==
=== Singles: 19 (9 titles, 10 runner-ups) ===
Legend ATP Challengers (4–8) ITF Futures (5–2)	Finals by surface Hard (5–9) Clay (3–1) Grass (1–0)

Result	W–L	Date	Tournament	Tier	Surface	Opponent	Score
Win	1–0	Jul 2008	Spain F28, Dénia	Futures	Clay	(Spain) Pablo Martin-Adalia	7–6^{(7–1)}, 7–6^{(7–4)}
Loss	1–1	Sep 2008	Spain F36, Martos	Futures	Hard	(Spain) Roberto Bautista Agut	6–3, 3–6, 2–6
Win	2–1	Oct 2008	France F20, Rodez	Futures	Hard (i)	(Spain) Guillermo Alcaide	6–3, 6–4
Loss	2–2	Nov 2008	UAE F2, Fujairah	Futures	Hard	(Sweden) Filip Prpic	6–7^{(5–7)}, 1–6
Win	3–2	May 2009	Sarasota, US	Challenger	Clay	(Australia) Carsten Ball	7–6^{(7–4)}, 4–6, 6–3
Win	4–2	Jul 2010	Great Britain F8, Manchester	Futures	Grass	(United Kingdom) Jamie Baker	6–2, 7–6^{(7–5)}
Win	5–2	Sep 2010	Spain F31, Santander	Futures	Clay	(Spain) Guillermo Olaso	7–5, 6–4
Loss	5–3	Jul 2011	Lexington, US	Challenger	Hard	(United States) Wayne Odesnik	5–7, 4–6
Win	6–3	Aug 2011	Vancouver, Canada	Challenger	Hard	(United States) Robby Ginepri	7–5, 6–4
Win	7–3	Apr 2012	Chinese Taipei F2, Kaohsiung	Futures	Hard	(Japan) Hiroki Moriya	7–5, 7–6^{(7–3)}
Loss	7–4	Feb 2013	Adelaide, Australia	Challenger	Hard	(Australia) Matthew Barton	6–2, 6–3
Loss	7–5	May 2013	Anning, China	Challenger	Clay	(Hungary) Márton Fucsovics	7–5, 3–6, 6–3
Win	8–5	Jul 2013	Lexington, US	Challenger	Hard	(Australia) James Duckworth	4–6, 6–3, 6–4
Loss	8–6	Jul 2014	Lexington, US	Challenger	Hard	(Australia) James Duckworth	3–6, 4–6
Loss	8–7	Nov 2014	Traralgon, Australia	Challenger	Hard	(Australia) John Millman	4–6, 1–6
Win	9–7	Oct 2015	Bangalore, India	Challenger	Hard	(Spain) Adrián Menéndez Maceiras	6–2, 7–5
Loss	9–8	May 2018	Loughborough, UK	Challenger	Hard (i)	(Japan) Hiroki Moriya	2–6, 5–7
Loss	9–9	Aug 2018	Jinan, China	Challenger	Hard	(Australia) Alexei Popyrin	6–3, 1–6, 5–7
Loss	9–10	Jan 2020	Rennes, France	Challenger	Hard (i)	(France) Arthur Rinderknech	5–7, 4–6

=== Doubles: 6 (3 titles, 3 runner-ups) ===
Legend ATP Challengers (2–2) ITF Futures (1–1)	Finals by surface Hard (1–2) Clay (1–0) Grass (0–0) Carpet (1–1)

Result	W–L	Date	Tournament	Tier	Surface	Partner	Opponents	Score
Loss	1–0	Jun 2006	Spain F18, Tenerife	Futures	Carpet	(Germany) Tony Holzinger	(France) Jean-François Bachelot (France) Nicolas Tourte	4–6, 1–6
Win	1–1	Aug 2008	New Delhi, India	Challenger	Hard	(United Kingdom) Josh Goodall	(Japan) Tasuku Iwami (Japan) Hiroki Kondo	6–4, 6–1
Win	2–1	Feb 2009	Germany F4, Mettmann	Futures	Carpet (i)	(United Kingdom) Josh Goodall	(Belarus) Nikolai Fidirko (United Kingdom) Neil Pauffley	4–6, 6–0, [10–4]
Win	3–1	May 2010	Savannah, US	Challenger	Clay	(United Kingdom) Jamie Baker	(United States) Bobby Reynolds (South Africa) Fritz Wolmarans	6–3, 6–4
Loss	3–2	Apr 2011	Tallahassee, US	Challenger	Hard	(Japan) Go Soeda	(Canada) Vasek Pospisil (United States) Bobby Reynolds	2–6, 4–6
Loss	3–3	Jul 2011	Lexington, US	Challenger	Hard	(United States) Michael Yani	(Australia) Jordan Kerr (United States) David Martin	3–6, 4–6

== National participation ==
=== Davis Cup: 21 (10 wins, 11 losses) ===
Group membership World Group (2–6) Group I (1–3) Group II (7–2)	Matches by surface Hard (7–6) Clay (1–4) Grass (2–1)	Matches by type Singles (10–11) Doubles (0–0)	Matches by venue Great Britain (8–6) Away (2–5)

- ▲ ▼ indicates the result of the Davis Cup match followed by the score, date, place of event, the zonal classification and its phase, and the court surface.

Rubber outcome	No.	Rubber	Match type (partner if any)	Opponent nation	Opponent player(s)	Score
▼2–3; 5–7 March 2010; SEB Arena, Vilnius, Lithuania; Group II Europe/Africa first round; hard(i) surface
Victory	1.	II	Singles	Lithuania	Laurynas Grigelis	6–4, 6–2, 6–4
Defeat	2.	IV	Singles	Lithuania	Ričardas Berankis	6–7^{(4–7)}, 3–6, 4–6
▲5–0; 9–11 July 2010; Devonshire Park, Eastbourne, Great Britain; Group II Europe/Africa relegation play-off; grass surface
Victory	3.	II	Singles	Turkey	Marsel İlhan	6–2, 7–5, 6–7^{(0–7)}, 6–1
Victory	4.	V (dead rubber)	Singles	Turkey	Ergün Zorlu	6–1, 6–3
▲4–1; 4–6 March 2011; Bolton Arena, Bolton, Great Britain; Group II Europe/Africa first round; hard(i) surface
Victory	5.	II	Singles	Tunisia	Sami Ghorbel	6–0, 6–2, 6–0
Victory	6.	IV	Singles	Tunisia	Malek Jaziri	3–6, 6–3, 3–6, 6–3, 8–6
▲4–1; 8–10 July 2011; Braehead Arena, Glasgow, Great Britain; Group II Europe/Africa quarterfinal; hard(i) surface
Defeat	7.	I	Singles	Luxembourg	Gilles Müller	2–6, 6–7^{(4–7)}, 1–6
Victory	8.	V (dead rubber)	Singles	Luxembourg	Mike Vermeer	6–1, 6–3
▲5–0; 16–18 September 2011; Braehead Arena, Glasgow, Great Britain; Group II Europe/Africa Semifinal; hard(i) surface
Victory	9.	I	Singles	Hungary	Attila Balázs	6–4, 6–4, 4–6, 6–4
▲3–2; 10–12 February 2012; Braehead Arena, Glasgow, Great Britain; Group I Europe/Africa first round; hard(i) surface
Defeat	10.	II	Singles	Slovakia	Martin Kližan	2–6, 6–4, 4–6, 6–7^{(3–7)}
Defeat	11.	IV	Singles	Slovakia	Lukáš Lacko	6–7^{(6–8)}, 1–6, 3–6
▲3–2; 10–12 February 2013; Ricoh Arena, Coventry, Great Britain; Group I Europe/Africa quarterfinal; hard(i) surface
Defeat	12.	II	Singles	Russia	Evgeny Donskoy	6–4, 6–4, 3–6, 5–7, 6–8
Victory	13.	IV	Singles	Russia	Dmitry Tursunov	6–4, 5–7, 5–7, 6–4, 6–4
▲3–1; 31 January – 2 February 2014; Petco Park, San Diego, California, United States; World Group first round; clay surface
Victory	14.	II	Singles	United States	Sam Querrey	1–6, 7–6^{(7–3)}, 3–6, 6–4, 6–1
▼2–3; 4–6 April 2014; Tennis Club Napoli, Naples, Italy; World Group quarterfinal; clay surface
Defeat	15.	I	Singles	Italy	Fabio Fognini	4–6, 6–2, 4–6, 1–6
Defeat	16.	V	Singles	Italy	Andreas Seppi	4–6, 3–6, 4–6
▲3–2; 6–8 March 2015; Commonwealth Arena, Glasgow, Great Britain; World Group first round; hard (i) surface
Victory	17.	II	Singles	United States	John Isner	6–7^{(5–7)}, 5–7, 6–3, 7–6^{(7–3)}, 15–13
Defeat	18.	V (dead rubber)	Singles	United States	Donald Young	7–5, 0–1 ret.
▲3–1; 17–19 July 2015; Queen's Club, London, Great Britain; World Group quarterfinal; grass surface
Defeat	19.	I	Singles	France	Gilles Simon	4–6, 4–6, 1–6
▲3–2; 15–17 July 2016; Tašmajdan Sports Center, Belgrade, Serbia; World Group quarterfinal; clay surface
Defeat	20.	II	Singles	Serbia	Dušan Lajović	1–6, 3–6, 2–6
Defeat	21.	V (dead rubber)	Singles	Serbia	Janko Tipsarević	2–6, 6–3, 5–7

== World TeamTennis ==
Ward played his first season with World TeamTennis in 2019 debuting with the San Diego Aviators but finishing up with the Orange County Breakers after a rare trade during the team's playoff push. He is set to join the Orlando Storm during the 2020 season scheduled to begin 12 July.
