= Charles Sturt Adelaide International =

Defunct tennis tournament
- Location: West Lakes, Australia
- Category: ATP Challenger Tour
- Surface: Hard
- Draw: 32S/29Q/16D
- Prize money: $50,000

The Charles Sturt Adelaide International was a tennis tournament held in West Lakes, Australia in 2013 and in 2014. The event was part of the ATP Challenger Tour and was played on hardcourts.

== Past finals ==
=== Singles ===
| Year | Champion | Runner-up | Score |
|---|---|---|---|
| 2014 | (United States) Bradley Klahn | (Japan) Tatsuma Ito | 6–3, 7–6^{(11–9)} |
| 2013 | (Australia) Matthew Barton | (United Kingdom) James Ward | 6–2, 6–3 |

=== Doubles ===
| Year | Champions | Runners-up | Score |
|---|---|---|---|
| 2014 | (New Zealand) Marcus Daniell (United States) Jarmere Jenkins | (Australia) Dane Propoggia (New Zealand) Jose Rubin Statham | 6–4, 6–4 |
| 2013 | (Australia) Samuel Groth (Australia) Matt Reid | (Australia) James Duckworth (Australia) Greg Jones | 6–2, 6–4 |
