= Matthew Barton (tennis) =

Australian professional tennis player

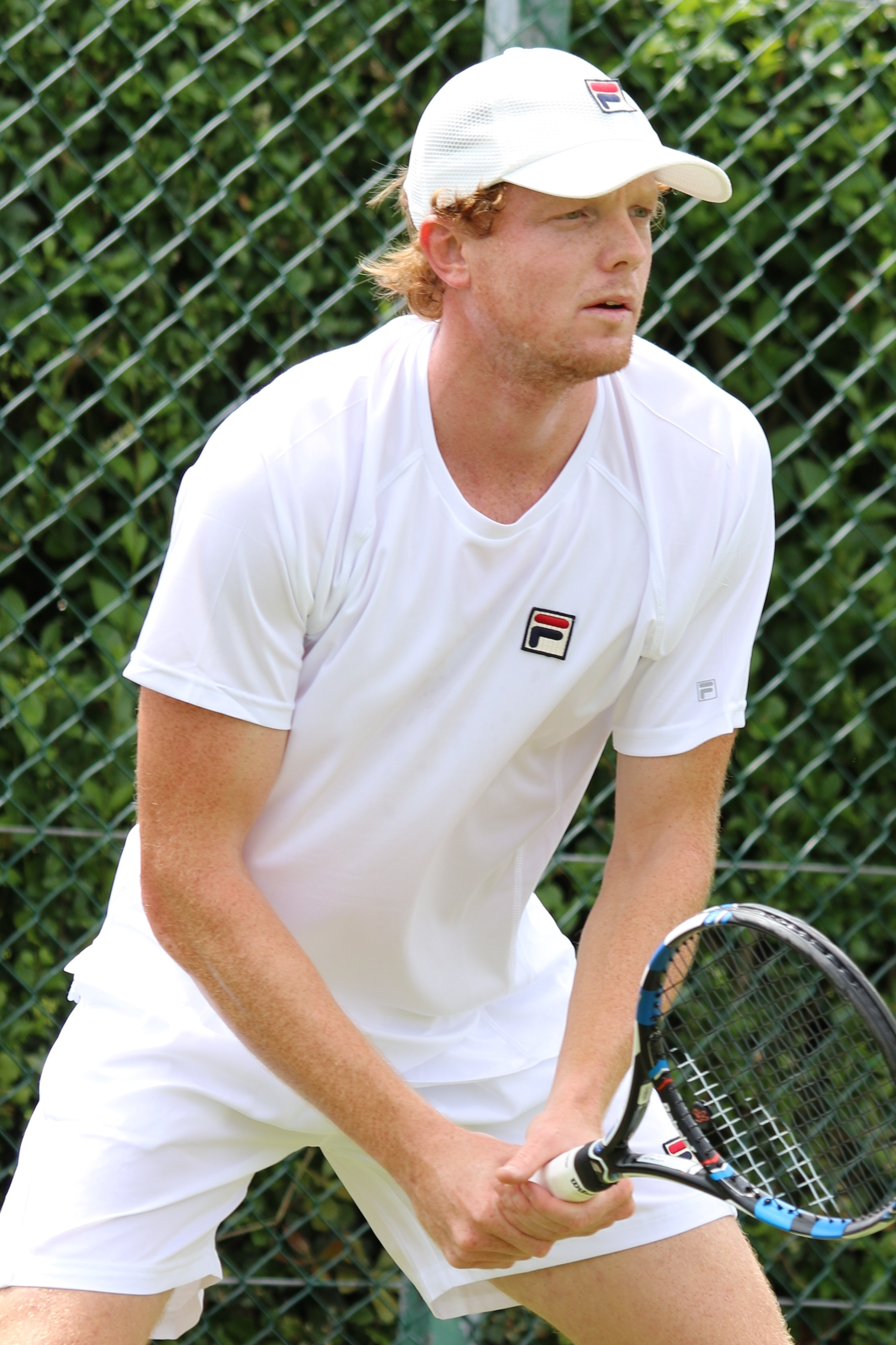
- Barton at the 2016 Wimbledon Championships
- Country (sports): Australia
- Residence: Collaroy, Australia
- Born: 16 December 1991 (age 34) Sydney, Australia
- Height: 1.91 m (6 ft 3 in)
- Turned pro: 2012
- Plays: Right-handed (two-handed backhand)
- Coach: Wally Masur
- Prize money: $269,379

Singles
- Career record: 4–4 (in ATP World Tour and Grand Slam main draw matches and in Davis Cup)
- Career titles: 0
- Highest ranking: No. 183 (18 July 2016)

Grand Slam singles results
- Australian Open: Q2 (2013)
- French Open: Q2 (2016)
- Wimbledon: 2R (2016)
- US Open: Q2 (2016)

Doubles
- Career record: 2–2 (in ATP World Tour and Grand Slam main draw matches and in Davis Cup)
- Career titles: 0
- Highest ranking: No. 306 (18 March 2013)

Grand Slam doubles results
- Australian Open: 2R (2013, 2017)
- Last updated on: 11 July 2016.

Matthew Barton (born 16 December 1991) is an Australian professional tennis player. He made his Grand Slam singles debut at the 2016 Wimbledon Championships reaching the second round.

== Personal ==
Barton grew up on the Northern Beaches of Sydney. He attended St Luke's Grammar School.

== Professional career ==
=== 2012 ===
Barton won his first ITF Futures title defeating Samuel Groth in the final 7–6(3) 6–3.

Barton played the 2013 Australian Open Wildcard Playoff defeating Thanasi Kokkinakis and Nick Kyrgios.

=== 2013 ===
Barton defeated Croatian Ivo Karlović 6–7(0) 7–6(5) 7–6(5) at the Apia International Sydney qualification, Then beat Tatsuma Ito 7–5 6–1. Before losing to Björn Phau of Germany.

Barton reached the 2nd round of the Australian Open with John Millman defeating Marinko Matosevic and Daniel Gimeno Traver in the opening round. Before losing to Kevin Anderson and Jonathan Erlich.

Barton won his first ATP Challenger Tour Title in West Lakes defeating the number 2 British player James Ward in the final 6–2 6–3.

Barton lost round 1 of qualification at the French Open, Wimbledon and lost to Donald Young at the US Open. He ended 2013 with a ranking of 253.

=== 2014 ===
Barton lost in round 1 of qualification at the 2014 Brisbane International, 2014 Apia International Sydney and 2014 Australian Open in January, before returning to the Challenger and Futures circuit in Australia and Croatia. He ended 2014 with a ranking of 524.

=== 2015 ===
Barton played Challengers and Futures in 2015, making three finals and winning two of them. He ended 2015 with a ranking of 299.

=== 2016 ===
Barton commenced 2016 by qualifying for the Auckland ASB Classic defeating Denis Kudla 6–2 6–0. In the main draw he beat Steve Johnson first round 6–3 3–6 6–3, this was his first ever ATP Tour level win. He then lost second round to top seed and world number 6 David Ferrer in straight sets. Barton qualified for Houston defeating Reilly Opelka in straight sets. He defeated Frances Tiafoe in the opening round before losing to defending champion Jack Sock second round. At Roland Garros he lost in qualifying to Radek Štěpánek 6–3 2–6 5–7. In June, Barton went on to qualify for his first main draw grand slam event at 2016 Wimbledon Championships, defeating Karen Khachanov in the final round of qualifying 7–6(1) 6–7(1) 6–2 6–3. In the main draw, Barton recorded his first ever grand slam victory over Frenchman Albano Olivetti in 5 sets 6–7(7) 7–6(5) 6–3 6–7(5) 14–12. Barton was defeated by John Isner second round 6–7(8) 6–7(3) 6–7(8). Barton defeated Nikoloz Basilashvili at the 2016 US Open qualifying 6–7(3) 6–2 7–6(6). Barton ended 2016 with a ranking of 197.

=== 2017 ===
In January, Barton qualified for the 2017 Apia International Sydney by defeating Mikhail Kukushkin. He upset Kyle Edmund in the opening round on centre court 7–6(3) 7–6(5). Before losing to eventual champion Gilles Müller in the second round 1–6 6–3 4–6.

== Professional career finals ==
=== Singles: 4 (5–1) ===
Legend (singles)
Grand Slam (0–0)
ATP World Tour Finals (0–0)
ATP World Tour Masters 1000 (0–0)
ATP World Tour 500 Series (0–0)
ATP World Tour 250 Series (0–0)
ATP Challenger Tour (1–0)
ITF Futures Tour (5–1)

Outcome	No.	Date	Tournament	Surface	Opponent	Score
Winner	1.	3 September 2012	Alice Springs, Australia	Hard	(Australia) Samuel Groth	7–6^{(7–3)} 6–3
Winner	2.	4 February 2013	West Lakes, Australia	Hard	(United Kingdom) James Ward	6–2, 6–3
Winner	3.	3 March 2015	Port Pirie, Australia	Hard	(United States) Alexander Sarkissian	6–3 6–4
Winner	4.	10 March 2015	Mildura, Australia	Grass	(Australia) Harry Bourchier	6–4 6–2
Runner-up	5.	1 April 2015	Mornington, Australia	Clay	(New Zealand) Rubin Statham	6–2 3–6 4–6
Winner	6.	7 May 2016	Calabasas, United States	Hard	(Switzerland) Henri Laaksonen	7-6^{(7–3)} 6-3

== Grand Slam performance timeline ==
Key
W	F	SF	QF	#R	RR	Q#	DNQ	A	NH

(W) winner; (F) finalist; (SF) semifinalist; (QF) quarterfinalist; (#R) rounds 4, 3, 2, 1; (RR) round-robin stage; (Q#) qualification round; (DNQ) did not qualify; (A) absent; (NH) not held; (SR) strike rate (events won / competed); (W–L) win–loss record.
To avoid confusion and double counting, these charts are updated at the conclusion of a tournament or when the player's participation has ended.

Tournament	2013	2014	2015	2016	2017	W–L
Grand Slam tournaments
Australian Open	Q2	Q1	A	A		0–0
French Open	Q1	A	A	Q2		0–0
Wimbledon	Q1	A	A	2R		1–1
US Open	Q1	A	A	Q2		0–0
Win–loss	0–0	0–0	0–0	1–1		0–0
Year-end ranking	253	524	299	197		
