= 2017 Hall of Fame Tennis Championships – Doubles =

Doubles
- 2017 Hall of Fame Tennis Championships

Final
- Champions: (Pakistan) Aisam-ul-Haq Qureshi (United States) Rajeev Ram
- Runners-up: (Australia) Matt Reid (Australia) John-Patrick Smith
- Score: 6–4, 4–6, [10–7]

Events
| Singles | Doubles |
| ← 2016 · | Hall of Fame Tennis Championships | · 2018 → |

Sam Groth and Chris Guccione were the defending champions, but Guccione chose not to participate this year. Groth played alongside Leander Paes, but lost in the semifinals to Aisam-ul-Haq Qureshi and Rajeev Ram.

Qureshi and Ram went on to win the title, defeating Matt Reid and John-Patrick Smith in the final, 6–4, 4–6, [10–7].

== Seeds ==
1. (Pakistan) Aisam-ul-Haq Qureshi / (United States) Rajeev Ram (champions)
2. (Mexico) Santiago González / (United States) Scott Lipsky (quarterfinals)
3. (Australia) Sam Groth / (India) Leander Paes (semifinals)
4. (India) Purav Raja / (India) Divij Sharan (quarterfinals)

== Draw ==
=== Key ===
- Q = Qualifier
- WC = Wild card
- LL = Lucky loser
- Alt = Alternate
- SE = Special exempt
- PR = Protected ranking
- ITF = ITF entry
- JE = Junior exempt
- w/o = Walkover
- r = Retired
- d = Defaulted
- SR = Special ranking

=== Draw ===
First round
1 | (Pakistan) A-u-H Qureshi (United States) R Ram | 6 | 6
PR | (Dominican Republic) V Estrella Burgos (Venezuela) R Maytín | 0 | 0
(Thailand) Sa Ratiwatana (Thailand) So Ratiwatana | 6 | 3 | [7]
PR | (Spain) A Menéndez-Maceiras (Mexico) MÁ Reyes-Varela | 4 | 6 | [10]
3 | (Australia) S Groth (India) L Paes | 6 | 7^{7}
(Switzerland) M Chiudinelli (France) A Mannarino | 3 | 6^{2}
(Netherlands) W Koolhof (New Zealand) A Sitak | 7 | 4 | [10]
(India) J Nedunchezhiyan (France) H Nys | 5 | 6 | [3]
(Australia) M Reid (Australia) J-P Smith | 4 | 6 | [22]
(Chinese Taipei) C-p Hsieh (Chinese Taipei) H-y Peng | 6 | 4 | [20]
(Russia) K Kravchuk (Ukraine) I Marchenko | 5 | 3
4 | (India) P Raja (India) D Sharan | 7 | 6
(Australia) A Bolt (Australia) A Whittington | 6 | 6
WC | (United States) A Krajicek (Mexico) G López Villaseñor | 3 | 4
WC | (United States) T Fritz (United States) M Krueger | 3 | 5
2 | (Mexico) S González (United States) S Lipsky | 6 | 7

Quarterfinals
1 | (Pakistan) A-u-H Qureshi (United States) R Ram | 6 | 6
PR | (Spain) A Menéndez-Maceiras (Mexico) MÁ Reyes-Varela | 1 | 2
3 | (Australia) S Groth (India) L Paes | 6 | 6
(Netherlands) W Koolhof (New Zealand) A Sitak | 4 | 1
(Australia) M Reid (Australia) J-P Smith | 7^{7} | 7^{7}
4 | (India) P Raja (India) D Sharan | 6^{5} | 6^{4}
(Australia) A Bolt (Australia) A Whittington | 6 | 7
2 | (Mexico) S González (United States) S Lipsky | 3 | 5

Semifinals
1 | (Pakistan) A-u-H Qureshi (United States) R Ram | 4 | 7^{8} | [11]
3 | (Australia) S Groth (India) L Paes | 6 | 6^{6} | [9]
(Australia) M Reid (Australia) J-P Smith | 6 | 4 | [10]
(Australia) A Bolt (Australia) A Whittington | 2 | 6 | [5]

Final
1 | (Pakistan) A-u-H Qureshi (United States) R Ram | 6 | 4 | [10]
(Australia) M Reid (Australia) J-P Smith | 4 | 6 | [7]
