= 2017 Hall of Fame Tennis Championships =

- Date: July 17–23
- Edition: 42nd
- Category: ATP World Tour 250 series
- Surface: Grass / Outdoor
- Location: Newport, Rhode Island, United States
- Venue: International Tennis Hall of Fame

Champions

Singles
- (United States) John Isner

Doubles
- (Pakistan) Aisam-ul-Haq Qureshi / (United States) Rajeev Ram
← 2016 ·	Hall of Fame Tennis Championships	· 2018 →

The 2017 Hall of Fame Tennis Championships (also known as the Dell Technologies Hall of Fame Open for sponsorship reasons) was a men's tennis tournament played on outdoor grass courts. It was the 42nd edition of the Hall of Fame Tennis Championships, and part of the ATP World Tour 250 series of the 2017 ATP World Tour. It took place at the International Tennis Hall of Fame in Newport, Rhode Island, United States, from July 17 through July 23, 2017.

== Singles main-draw entrants ==
=== Seeds ===
Country	Player	Rank^{1}	Seed
USA	John Isner	21	1
CRO	Ivo Karlović	23	2
FRA	Adrian Mannarino	51	3
FRA	Pierre-Hugues Herbert	70	4
DOM	Víctor Estrella Burgos	96	5
SVK	Lukáš Lacko	105	6
USA	Tennys Sandgren	106	7
UKR	Illya Marchenko	117	8

- ^{1} Rankings are as of July 3, 2017

=== Other entrants ===
The following players received wildcards into the singles main draw:

- (United States) Thai-Son Kwiatkowski
- (United States) Michael Mmoh
- (United States) Rajeev Ram

The following players received entry from the qualifying draw:

- (Canada) Frank Dancevic
- (Australia) Matthew Ebden
- (Australia) Sam Groth
- (United States) Austin Krajicek

=== Withdrawals ===
Before the tournament

- (Cyprus) Marcos Baghdatis →replaced by (Switzerland) Marco Chiudinelli
- (Australia) James Duckworth →replaced by (United States) Stefan Kozlov
- (United States) Ernesto Escobedo →replaced by (Germany) Peter Gojowczyk
- (Austria) Jürgen Melzer →replaced by (United States) Bjorn Fratangelo
- (Luxembourg) Gilles Müller →replaced by (Japan) Akira Santillan
- (United States) Sam Querrey →replaced by (United States) Mitchell Krueger
- (Australia) Jordan Thompson →replaced by (Germany) Tobias Kamke
- (Israel) Dudi Sela →replaced by (United States) Dennis Novikov
- (Germany) Mischa Zverev →replaced by (United States) Denis Kudla

== Doubles main-draw entrants ==
=== Seeds ===
Country	Player	Country	Player	Rank^{1}	Seed
USA	Rajeev Ram	PAK	Aisam-ul-Haq Qureshi	37	1
MEX	Santiago González	USA	Scott Lipsky	110	2
AUS	Sam Groth	IND	Leander Paes	114	3
IND	Purav Raja	IND	Divij Sharan	114	4

- Rankings are as of July 3, 2017

=== Other entrants ===
The following pairs received wildcards into the doubles main draw:

- (United States) Taylor Fritz / (United States) Mitchell Krueger
- (United States) Austin Krajicek / (Mexico) Gerardo López Villaseñor

== Champions ==
=== Singles ===
- (United States) John Isner def. (Australia) Matthew Ebden, 6–3, 7–6^{(7–4)}

=== Doubles ===
- (Pakistan) Aisam-ul-Haq Qureshi / (United States) Rajeev Ram def. (Australia) Matt Reid / (Australia) John-Patrick Smith, 6–4, 4–6, [10–7]
