= 2017 Wimbledon Championships – Men's singles =

Men's singles
- 2017 Wimbledon Championships

Final
- Champion: (Switzerland) Roger Federer
- Runner-up: (Croatia) Marin Čilić
- Score: 6–3, 6–1, 6–4

Details
- Draw: 128 (16Q / 5WC)
- Seeds: 32

Events
Singles	men	women		boys	girls
Doubles	men	women	mixed	boys	girls
WC Singles	men	women	quad
WC Doubles	men	women	quad
Legends	men	women	seniors
- Wimbledon Championships

Roger Federer defeated Marin Čilić in the final, 6–3, 6–1, 6–4 to win the gentlemen's singles title at the 2017 Wimbledon Championships. It was his record eighth Wimbledon men's singles title (surpassing Pete Sampras and William Renshaw's all-time record) and record-extending 19th major title overall. Federer did not lose a set during the tournament, the second man to do so at Wimbledon in the Open Era after Björn Borg in 1976. It was his record-equaling 70th appearance at a men's singles major, and a record eleventh men's singles final at the same major. With his third-round win over Mischa Zverev, Federer won his Open Era record 317th major singles match. With his first-round win, Federer surpassed Jimmy Connors' record for the most match wins at Wimbledon. In the same match, he hit his 10,000th career ace, only the third man to do so. This tournament marked the fifth season where Rafael Nadal won the French Open and Federer won Wimbledon.

Andy Murray was the defending champion and top seed, but was defeated by Sam Querrey in the quarterfinals – the second consecutive year in which Querrey beat the defending champion and world No. 1 at Wimbledon, after beating Novak Djokovic in the third round the previous year. Murray nonetheless retained the world No. 1 singles ranking, as Nadal, Stan Wawrinka, and Djokovic failed to gain enough ranking points to surpass him. Wawrinka was attempting to complete the career Grand Slam, but lost to future world No. 1 Daniil Medvedev in the first round. It was Medvedev's first victory in the main draw of a major.

This was the first major since the 2009 French Open in which Murray, Nadal and Djokovic all failed to reach the semifinals, and the first time since 2004 that no player reached all four major quarterfinals in a year. Querrey was the first American man to reach a major semifinal since Andy Roddick at the 2009 Wimbledon Championships.

For the first time since the 2005 Australian Open, David Ferrer was unseeded at a major. This marked the last major appearance of former world No. 2 Tommy Haas; he lost in the first round to Ruben Bemelmans.

== Seeds ==
All seedings per modified ATP rankings.

1. (United Kingdom) Andy Murray (quarterfinals)
2. (Serbia) Novak Djokovic (quarterfinals, retired)
3. (Switzerland) Roger Federer (champion)
4. (Spain) Rafael Nadal (fourth round)
5. (Switzerland) Stan Wawrinka (first round)
6. (Canada) Milos Raonic (quarterfinals)
7. (Croatia) Marin Čilić (final)
8. (Austria) Dominic Thiem (fourth round)
9. (Japan) Kei Nishikori (third round)
10. (Germany) Alexander Zverev (fourth round)
11. (Czech Republic) Tomáš Berdych (semifinals)
12. (France) Jo-Wilfried Tsonga (third round)
13. (Bulgaria) Grigor Dimitrov (fourth round)
14. (France) Lucas Pouille (second round)
15. (France) Gaël Monfils (third round)
16. (Luxembourg) Gilles Müller (quarterfinals)

17. (United States) Jack Sock (second round)
18. (Spain) Roberto Bautista Agut (fourth round)
19. (Spain) Feliciano López (first round, retired)
20. (Australia) Nick Kyrgios (first round, retired)
21. (Croatia) Ivo Karlović (first round)
22. (France) Richard Gasquet (first round)
23. (United States) John Isner (second round)
24. (United States) Sam Querrey (semifinals)
25. (Spain) Albert Ramos Viñolas (third round)
26. (United States) Steve Johnson (third round)
27. (Germany) Mischa Zverev (third round)
28. (Italy) Fabio Fognini (third round)
29. (Argentina) Juan Martín del Potro (second round)
30. (Russia) Karen Khachanov (third round)
31. (Spain) Fernando Verdasco (first round)
32. (Italy) Paolo Lorenzi (second round)

Click on the seed number of a player to go to their draw section.

== Draw ==
Key

- Q = Qualifier
- WC = Wild card
- LL = Lucky loser
- Alt = Alternate
- ITF = ITF entry
- PR = Protected ranking
- SR = Special ranking
- SE = Special exempt
- JE = Junior exempt
- JR = Junior Accelerator Programme entrant
- CO = College Accelerator Programme entrant
- NG = Next Gen Accelerator Program entrant
- w/o = Walkover
- r = Retired
- d = Defaulted

=== Finals ===
Quarterfinals
1	(United Kingdom) Andy Murray	6	4	7^{7}	1	1
24	(United States) Sam Querrey	3	6	6^{4}	6	6
16	(Luxembourg) Gilles Müller	6	6^{6}	5	7	1
7	(Croatia) Marin Čilić	3	7^{8}	7	5	6
6	(Canada) Milos Raonic	4	2	6^{4}
3	(Switzerland) Roger Federer	6	6	7^{7}
11	(Czech Republic) Tomáš Berdych	7^{7}	2
2	(Serbia) Novak Djokovic	6^{2}	0^{r}

Semifinals
24	(United States) Sam Querrey	7^{8}	4	6^{3}	5
7	(Croatia) Marin Čilić	6^{6}	6	7^{7}	7
3	(Switzerland) Roger Federer	7^{7}	7^{7}	6
11	(Czech Republic) Tomáš Berdych	6^{4}	6^{4}	4

Final
7	(Croatia) Marin Čilić	3	1	4
3	(Switzerland) Roger Federer	6	6	6

=== Top half ===
==== Section 1 ====
First round
1	(United Kingdom) A Murray	6	6	6
LL	(Kazakhstan) A Bublik	1	4	2
(Portugal) J Sousa	6	6^{5}	4	4
(Germany) D Brown	3	7^{7}	6	6
(Czech Republic) J Veselý	6	4	4	7	6
Q	(Ukraine) I Marchenko	1	6	6	5	1
PR	(Russia) D Tursunov	1	3	3
28	(Italy) F Fognini	6	6	6
20	(Australia) N Kyrgios	3	4	0^{r}
(France) P-H Herbert	6	6	0
(Brazil) R Dutra Silva	4	6	6^{10}	4
(France) B Paire	6	3	7^{12}	6
WC	(Canada) D Shapovalov	4	6	3	6^{2}
PR	(Poland) J Janowicz	6	3	6	7^{7}
(Tunisia) M Jaziri	7^{7}	4	4	6^{2}
14	(France) L Pouille	6^{5}	6	6	7^{7}

Second round
1	(United Kingdom) A Murray	6	6	6
(Germany) D Brown	3	2	2
(Czech Republic) J Veselý	6^{3}	4	2
28	(Italy) F Fognini	7^{7}	6	6
(France) P-H Herbert	6^{4}	1	4
(France) B Paire	7^{7}	6	6
PR	(Poland) J Janowicz	7^{7}	7^{7}	3	6
14	(France) L Pouille	6^{4}	6^{5}	6	1

Third round
1	(United Kingdom) A Murray	6	4	6	7
28	(Italy) F Fognini	2	6	1	5
(France) B Paire	6	7^{7}	6
PR	(Poland) J Janowicz	2	6^{3}	3

Fourth round
1	(United Kingdom) A Murray	7^{7}	6	6
(France) B Paire	6^{1}	4	4

==== Section 2 ====
First round
12	(France) J-W Tsonga	6	6	6
WC	(United Kingdom) C Norrie	3	2	2
Q	(Italy) S Bolelli	6	1	6	6
(Chinese Taipei) Y-h Lu	3	6	3	4
(Argentina) C Berlocq	4	6^{3}	1
(Georgia (country)) N Basilashvili	6	7^{7}	6
(Italy) T Fabbiano	6^{5}	5	2
24	(United States) S Querrey	7^{7}	7	6
31	(Spain) F Verdasco	6	6^{5}	6^{8}	3
(South Africa) K Anderson	2	7^{7}	7^{10}	6
(Slovakia) N Gombos	2	6	2	1
(Italy) A Seppi	6	3	6	6
WC	(Germany) T Haas	2	6	3	5
Q	(Belgium) R Bemelmans	6	3	6	7
(Russia) D Medvedev	6	3	6	6
5	(Switzerland) S Wawrinka	4	6	4	1

Second round
12	(France) J-W Tsonga	6	7	6
Q	(Italy) S Bolelli	1	5	2
(Georgia (country)) N Basilashvili	4	6	3	3
24	(United States) S Querrey	6	4	6	6
(South Africa) K Anderson	6	7^{7}	6
(Italy) A Seppi	3	6^{4}	3
Q	(Belgium) R Bemelmans	6	6	3	2	6
(Russia) D Medvedev	4	2	6	6	3

Third round
12	(France) J-W Tsonga	2	6	6^{5}	6	5
24	(United States) S Querrey	6	3	7^{7}	1	7
(South Africa) K Anderson	7^{7}	6	7^{7}
Q	(Belgium) R Bemelmans	6^{3}	4	6^{3}

Fourth round
24	(United States) S Querrey	5	7^{7}	6	6^{11}	6
(South Africa) K Anderson	7	6^{5}	3	7^{13}	3

==== Section 3 ====
First round
4	(Spain) R Nadal	6	6	6
PR	(Australia) J Millman	1	3	2
(United States) D Young	5	6	6	4
(Uzbekistan) D Istomin	7	4	4	2^{r}
(Brazil) T Monteiro	4	6	7^{7}	7^{7}
Q	(Australia) A Whittington	6	3	6^{4}	6^{5}
(Russia) A Kuznetsov	6^{4}	6	3	6	2
30	(Russia) K Khachanov	7^{7}	2	6	1	6
21	(Croatia) I Karlović	7^{7}	6^{6}	7^{9}	6^{7}	6
(United Kingdom) A Bedene	6^{5}	7^{8}	6^{7}	7^{9}	8
(Bosnia and Herzegovina) D Džumhur	6	6	6
(Argentina) R Olivo	2	0	1
Q	(Czech Republic) L Rosol	4	7	6	6
(Switzerland) H Laaksonen	6	5	3	4
WC	(Hungary) M Fucsovics	5	4	2
16	(Luxembourg) G Müller	7	6	6

Second round
4	(Spain) R Nadal	6	6	7
(United States) D Young	4	2	5
(Brazil) T Monteiro	6	6^{5}	6^{3}	5
30	(Russia) K Khachanov	3	7^{7}	7^{7}	7
(United Kingdom) A Bedene	6	3	6	6
(Bosnia and Herzegovina) D Džumhur	3	6	3	3
Q	(Czech Republic) L Rosol	5	7^{9}	6	3	7
16	(Luxembourg) G Müller	7	6^{7}	4	6	9

Third round
4	(Spain) R Nadal	6	6	7^{7}
30	(Russia) K Khachanov	1	4	6^{3}
(United Kingdom) A Bedene	6^{4}	5	4
16	(Luxembourg) G Müller	7^{7}	7	6

Fourth round
4	(Spain) R Nadal	3	4	6	6	13
16	(Luxembourg) G Müller	6	6	3	4	15

==== Section 4 ====
First round
9	(Japan) K Nishikori	6	6	6
(Italy) M Cecchinato	2	2	0
(France) J Benneteau	3	6^{8}	6	2
Q	(Ukraine) S Stakhovsky	6	7^{10}	2	6
Q	(Germany) P Gojowczyk	7^{7}	2	6	6
(Romania) M Copil	6^{5}	6	3	1
PR	(Austria) A Haider-Maurer	3	1	2
18	(Spain) R Bautista Agut	6	6	6
26	(United States) S Johnson	6	7	6
(Argentina) N Kicker	4	5	3
(Argentina) F Bagnis	6	4	6^{9}	6^{3}
(Moldova) R Albot	4	6	7^{11}	7^{7}
(Serbia) V Troicki	1	0^{r}
(Germany) F Mayer	6	0
(Germany) P Kohlschreiber	4	2	3
7	(Croatia) M Čilić	6	6	6

Second round
9	(Japan) K Nishikori	6	6^{7}	6	7^{8}
Q	(Ukraine) S Stakhovsky	4	7^{9}	1	6^{6}
Q	(Germany) P Gojowczyk	2	1	6	3
18	(Spain) R Bautista Agut	6	6	3	6
26	(United States) S Johnson	6	6	4	6
(Moldova) R Albot	3	3	6	3
(Germany) F Mayer	6^{2}	4	5
7	(Croatia) M Čilić	7^{7}	6	7

Third round
9	(Japan) K Nishikori	4	6^{3}	6	3
18	(Spain) R Bautista Agut	6	7^{7}	3	6
26	(United States) S Johnson	4	6^{3}	4
7	(Croatia) M Čilić	6	7^{7}	6

Fourth round
18	(Spain) R Bautista Agut	2	2	2
7	(Croatia) M Čilić	6	6	6

=== Bottom half ===
==== Section 5 ====
First round
6	(Canada) M Raonic	7^{7}	6	7^{7}
(Germany) J-L Struff	6^{5}	2	6^{4}
(Russia) M Youzhny	6	7	6
(France) N Mahut	2	5	4
Q	(Russia) A Rublev	6^{3}	6	7	1	7
Q	(Italy) S Travaglia	7^{7}	3	5	6	5
(Australia) J Thompson	4	4	6^{4}
25	(Spain) A Ramos Viñolas	6	6	7^{7}
17	(United States) J Sock	6	4	7^{7}	6
Q	(Chile) C Garín	3	6	6^{4}	3
(Brazil) T Bellucci	2	3	2
Q	(Austria) S Ofner	6	6	6
(Netherlands) R Haase	3	6	6^{5}	5
(United States) F Tiafoe	6	3	7^{7}	7
(Russia) E Donskoy	4	6^{3}	3
10	(Germany) A Zverev	6	7^{7}	6

Second round
6	(Canada) M Raonic	3	7^{9}	6	7
(Russia) M Youzhny	6	6^{7}	4	5
Q	(Russia) A Rublev	5	7^{8}	6	3	4
25	(Spain) A Ramos Viñolas	7	6^{6}	4	6	6
17	(United States) J Sock	3	4	6	6	2
Q	(Austria) S Ofner	6	6	3	2	6
(United States) F Tiafoe	3	4	3
10	(Germany) A Zverev	6	6	6

Third round
6	(Canada) M Raonic	7^{7}	6	7
25	(Spain) A Ramos Viñolas	6^{3}	4	5
Q	(Austria) S Ofner	4	4	2
10	(Germany) A Zverev	6	6	6

Fourth round
6	(Canada) M Raonic	4	7	4	7	6
10	(Germany) A Zverev	6	5	6	5	1

==== Section 6 ====
First round
13	(Bulgaria) G Dimitrov	7^{7}	6	6
(Argentina) D Schwartzman	6^{4}	2	2
WC	(United Kingdom) J Ward	4	4	3
(Cyprus) M Baghdatis	6	6	6
(Israel) D Sela	4	6	1	6	6
(Spain) M Granollers	6	3	6	2	1
Q	(United States) T Fritz	4	6^{3}	3
23	(United States) J Isner	6	7^{7}	6
27	(Germany) M Zverev	6	6	6
(Australia) B Tomic	4	3	4
(Kazakhstan) M Kukushkin	4	6	7^{7}	6
(Japan) T Daniel	6	4	6^{4}	2
Q	(Greece) S Tsitsipas	4	4	4
(Serbia) D Lajović	6	6	6
(Ukraine) A Dolgopolov	3	0^{r}
3	(Switzerland) R Federer	6	3

Second round
13	(Bulgaria) G Dimitrov	6	6	6
(Cyprus) M Baghdatis	3	2	1
(Israel) D Sela	6^{5}	7^{7}	5	7^{7}	6
23	(United States) J Isner	7^{7}	6^{5}	7	6^{5}	3
27	(Germany) M Zverev	6	6	2	3	6
(Kazakhstan) M Kukushkin	1	2	6	6	4
(Serbia) D Lajović	6^{0}	3	2
3	(Switzerland) R Federer	7^{7}	6	6

Third round
13	(Bulgaria) G Dimitrov	6	6	0
(Israel) D Sela	1	1	0^{r}
27	(Germany) M Zverev	6^{3}	4	4
3	(Switzerland) R Federer	7^{7}	6	6

Fourth round
13	(Bulgaria) G Dimitrov	4	2	4
3	(Switzerland) R Federer	6	6	6

==== Section 7 ====
First round
8	(Austria) D Thiem	6	6	6
(Canada) V Pospisil	4	4	3
(France) G Simon	7^{7}	6	6
Q	(Chile) N Jarry	6^{4}	3	3
(Serbia) J Tipsarević	0^{r}
(United States) J Donaldson	5
(Argentina) H Zeballos	6^{3}	6	6^{8}	5
32	(Italy) P Lorenzi	7^{7}	4	7^{10}	7
22	(France) R Gasquet	3	4	7	2
(Spain) D Ferrer	6	6	5	6
(Belgium) S Darcis	4	6	2	6	6
PR	(Lithuania) R Berankis	6	3	6	4	3
(Croatia) B Ćorić	6^{4}	4	6^{6}
(United States) R Harrison	7^{7}	6	7^{8}
(France) J Chardy	3	6	6^{4}	4
11	(Czech Republic) T Berdych	6	3	7^{7}	6

Second round
8	(Austria) D Thiem	5	6	6	6
(France) G Simon	7	4	2	4
(United States) J Donaldson	6	7^{7}	6^{0}	6
32	(Italy) P Lorenzi	4	6^{0}	7^{7}	2
(Spain) D Ferrer	3
(Belgium) S Darcis	0^{r}
(United States) R Harrison	4	3	7^{10}	3
11	(Czech Republic) T Berdych	6	6	6^{8}	6

Third round
8	(Austria) D Thiem	7	6	6
(United States) J Donaldson	5	4	2
(Spain) D Ferrer	3	4	3
11	(Czech Republic) T Berdych	6	6	6

Fourth round
8	(Austria) D Thiem	3	7^{7}	3	6	3
11	(Czech Republic) T Berdych	6	6^{1}	6	3	6

==== Section 8 ====
First round
15	(France) G Monfils	6	7	6
Q	(Germany) D Brands	3	5	4
(United Kingdom) K Edmund	4	6	6	6
Q	(United Kingdom) A Ward	6	3	2	1
(Japan) Y Sugita	7^{7}	6	6
WC	(United Kingdom) B Klein	6^{5}	3	0
(France) A Mannarino	5	6	6	4
19	(Spain) F López	7	1	1	3^{r}
29	(Argentina) JM del Potro	6	3	7^{7}	6
PR	(Australia) T Kokkinakis	3	6	6^{2}	4
PR	(Latvia) E Gulbis	6	6	6
(Dominican Republic) V Estrella Burgos	1	1	2
(Czech Republic) A Pavlásek	6^{7}	6	6	6
(United States) E Escobedo	7^{9}	1	3	1
(Slovakia) M Kližan	3	0^{r}
2	(Serbia) N Djokovic	6	2

Second round
15	(France) G Monfils	7^{7}	6	6
(United Kingdom) K Edmund	6^{1}	4	4
(Japan) Y Sugita	1	7	6	6^{2}	2
(France) A Mannarino	6	5	4	7^{7}	6
29	(Argentina) JM del Potro	4	4	6^{3}
PR	(Latvia) E Gulbis	6	6	7^{7}
(Czech Republic) A Pavlásek	2	2	1
2	(Serbia) N Djokovic	6	6	6

Third round
15	(France) G Monfils	6^{3}	6	7	3	2
(France) A Mannarino	7^{7}	4	5	6	6
PR	(Latvia) E Gulbis	4	1	6^{2}
2	(Serbia) N Djokovic	6	6	7^{7}

Fourth round
(France) A Mannarino	2	6^{5}	4
2	(Serbia) N Djokovic	6	7^{7}	6

== Seeded players ==
Seeds are adjusted on a surface-based system to reflect more accurately the individual player's grass court achievement as per the following formula, which applies to the top 32 players according to the ATP rankings on 26 June 2017:

- Take Entry System Position points at 26 June 2017.
- Add 100% points earned for all grass court tournaments in the past 12 months (20 June 2016 – 25 June 2017).
- Add 75% points earned for best grass court tournament in the 12 months before that (22 June 2015 – 19 June 2016).

Rank and points before are as of 3 July 2017. Because the 2017 tournament took place one week later than in 2016, points defending includes results from both the 2016 Wimbledon Championships and the tournaments from the week of 11 July 2016 (Hamburg, Newport and Båstad).

Seed	Rank	Player	Points before	Points defending	Points won	Points after	Status
1	1	(United Kingdom) Andy Murray	9,390	2,000	360	7,750	Quarterfinals lost to (United States) Sam Querrey [24]
2	4	(Serbia) Novak Djokovic	6,055	90	360	6,325	Quarterfinals retired against (Czech Republic) Tomáš Berdych [11]
3	5	(Switzerland) Roger Federer	5,265	720	2,000	6,545	Champion, defeated (Croatia) Marin Čilić [7]
4	2	(Spain) Rafael Nadal	7,285	0	180	7,465	Fourth round lost to (Luxembourg) Gilles Müller [16]
5	3	(Switzerland) Stan Wawrinka	6,175	45	10	6,140	First round lost to (Russia) Daniil Medvedev
6	7	(Canada) Milos Raonic	4,150	1,200	360	3,310	Quarterfinals lost to (Switzerland) Roger Federer [3]
7	6	(Croatia) Marin Čilić	4,235	360	1,200	5,075	Runner-up, lost to (Switzerland) Roger Federer [3]
8	8	(Austria) Dominic Thiem	3,895	45	180	4,030	Fourth round lost to (Czech Republic) Tomáš Berdych [11]
9	9	(Japan) Kei Nishikori	3,830	180	90	3,740	Third round lost to (Spain) Roberto Bautista Agut [18]
10	12	(Germany) Alexander Zverev	3,070	90	180	3,160	Fourth round lost to (Canada) Milos Raonic [6]
11	15	(Czech Republic) Tomáš Berdych	2,570	720	720	2,570	Semifinals lost to (Switzerland) Roger Federer [3]
12	10	(France) Jo-Wilfried Tsonga	3,075	360	90	2,805	Third round lost to (United States) Sam Querrey [24]
13	11	(Bulgaria) Grigor Dimitrov	3,070	90	180	3,160	Fourth round lost to (Switzerland) Roger Federer [3]
14	16	(France) Lucas Pouille	2,570	360	45	2,255	Second round lost to (Poland) Jerzy Janowicz [PR]
15	14	(France) Gaël Monfils	2,695	10	90	2,775	Third round lost to (France) Adrian Mannarino
16	26	(Luxembourg) Gilles Müller	1,675	45+150	360+45	1,885	Quarterfinals lost to (Croatia) Marin Čilić [7]
17	18	(United States) Jack Sock	2,335	90	45	2,290	Second round lost to (Austria) Sebastian Ofner [Q]
18	19	(Spain) Roberto Bautista Agut	2,155	90	180	2,245	Fourth round lost to (Croatia) Marin Čilić [7]
19	25	(Spain) Feliciano López	1,675	90	10	1,595	First round retired against (France) Adrian Mannarino
20	20	(Australia) Nick Kyrgios	2,110	180	10	1,940	First round retired against (France) Pierre-Hugues Herbert
21	23	(Croatia) Ivo Karlović	1,835	45+250	10+45	1,595	First round lost to (United Kingdom) Aljaž Bedene
22	27	(France) Richard Gasquet	1,560	180	10	1,390	First round lost to (Spain) David Ferrer
23	21	(United States) John Isner	1,930	90	45	1,885	Second round lost to (Israel) Dudi Sela
24	28	(United States) Sam Querrey	1,495	360	720	1,855	Semifinals lost to (Croatia) Marin Čilić [7]
25	22	(Spain) Albert Ramos Viñolas	1,885	90+250	90+90	1,725	Third round lost to (Canada) Milos Raonic [6]
26	31	(United States) Steve Johnson	1,395	180	90	1,305	Third round lost to (Croatia) Marin Čilić [7]
27	30	(Germany) Mischa Zverev	1,396	(25)	90	1,461	Third round lost to (Switzerland) Roger Federer [3]
28	29	(Italy) Fabio Fognini	1,430	45	90	1,475	Third round lost to (United Kingdom) Andy Murray [1]
29	32	(Argentina) Juan Martín del Potro	1,325	90	45	1,280	Second round lost to (Latvia) Ernests Gulbis [PR]
30	34	(Russia) Karen Khachanov	1,176	16+10	90+9	1,249	Third round lost to (Spain) Rafael Nadal [4]
31	35	(Spain) Fernando Verdasco	1,175	10+150	10+45	1,070	First round lost to (South Africa) Kevin Anderson
32	33	(Italy) Paolo Lorenzi	1,188	10	45	1,223	Second round lost to (United States) Jared Donaldson

=== Withdrawals ===
The following players would have been seeded, but withdrew from the event.

Rank	Player	Points Before	Points defending	Points after	Withdrawal reason
13	(Belgium) David Goffin	2,785	180	2,605	Ankle injury
17	(Spain) Pablo Carreño Busta	2,360	10	2,350	Abdominal injury
24	(Uruguay) Pablo Cuevas	1,735	10+300	1,425	Right knee injury

== Other entry information ==
=== Wild cards ===
- (Hungary) Márton Fucsovics
- (Germany) Tommy Haas
- (United Kingdom) Brydan Klein
- (United Kingdom) Cameron Norrie
- (Canada) Denis Shapovalov
- (United Kingdom) James Ward

=== Protected ranking ===
- (Austria) Andreas Haider-Maurer (63)
- (Australia) Thanasi Kokkinakis (81)
- (Australia) John Millman (81)
- (Russia) Dmitry Tursunov (89)
- (Lithuania) Ričardas Berankis (92)
- (Poland) Jerzy Janowicz (94)
- (Latvia) Ernests Gulbis (99)

=== Qualifiers ===
The qualifying competitions take place in Bank of England Sports Centre, Roehampton started from 26 June 2017 and to be scheduled to end on 29 June 2017. However, due to heavy rain on the second day, it has now extended to 30 June 2017.

- (Belgium) Ruben Bemelmans
- (Italy) Simone Bolelli
- (Germany) Daniel Brands
- (United States) Taylor Fritz
- (Chile) Cristian Garín
- (Germany) Peter Gojowczyk
- (Chile) Nicolás Jarry
- (Ukraine) Illya Marchenko
- (Austria) Sebastian Ofner
- (Czech Republic) Lukáš Rosol
- (Russia) Andrey Rublev
- (Ukraine) Sergiy Stakhovsky
- (Italy) Stefano Travaglia
- (Greece) Stefanos Tsitsipas
- (United Kingdom) Alexander Ward
- (Australia) Andrew Whittington

=== Lucky loser ===
- (Kazakhstan) Alexander Bublik

=== Withdrawals ===
- ‡ (Belgium) David Goffin (11) → replaced by (Russia) Evgeny Donskoy (99)
- ‡ (Spain) Nicolás Almagro (67) → replaced by (Latvia) Ernests Gulbis (99 PR)
- ‡ (Japan) Yoshihito Nishioka (69) → replaced by (Israel) Dudi Sela (100)
- ‡ (Spain) Pablo Carreño Busta (21) → replaced by (Argentina) Facundo Bagnis (101)
- ‡ (South Korea) Chung Hyeon (68) → replaced by (Italy) Marco Cecchinato (104) (Note: The last two players, Taro Daniel (102) and Thomas Fabbiano (103) were the next in and directly entered after two wild card slots went unused.)
- ‡ (United Kingdom) Dan Evans (55) → replaced by (Switzerland) Henri Laaksonen (105) (Note: Last direct acceptance)
- @ (Uruguay) Pablo Cuevas (23) → replaced by (Kazakhstan) Alexander Bublik (LL)

‡ – withdrew from entry list before qualifying began
@ – withdrew from entry list after qualifying began

=== Retirements ===
- (Belgium) Steve Darcis
- (Serbia) Novak Djokovic
- (Ukraine) Alexandr Dolgopolov
- (Uzbekistan) Denis Istomin
- (Slovakia) Martin Kližan
- (Australia) Nick Kyrgios
- (Spain) Feliciano López
- (Israel) Dudi Sela
- (Serbia) Janko Tipsarević
- (Serbia) Viktor Troicki

== Notes ==
Preceded by 2017 French Open – Men's singles	Grand Slam men's singles	Succeeded by 2017 US Open – Men's singles
