= 2018 Hall of Fame Tennis Championships =

- Date: July 16–22
- Edition: 43rd
- Category: ATP World Tour 250 series
- Surface: Grass / Outdoor
- Location: Newport, Rhode Island, United States
- Venue: International Tennis Hall of Fame

Champions

Singles
- (United States) Steve Johnson

Doubles
- (Israel) Jonathan Erlich / (New Zealand) Artem Sitak
← 2017 ·	Hall of Fame Tennis Championships	· 2019 →

The 2018 Hall of Fame Tennis Championships (also known as the Dell Technologies Hall of Fame Open for sponsorship reasons) was a men's tennis tournament played on outdoor grass courts. It was the 43rd edition of the Hall of Fame Tennis Championships, and part of the ATP World Tour 250 series of the 2017 ATP World Tour. It took place at the International Tennis Hall of Fame in Newport, Rhode Island, United States, from July 16 through July 22, 2018.

== Singles main-draw entrants ==
=== Seeds ===
Country	Player	Rank^{1}	Seed
FRA	Adrian Mannarino	26	1
GER	Mischa Zverev	41	2
USA	Steve Johnson	42	3
AUS	Matthew Ebden	51	4
USA	Ryan Harrison	59	5
LUX	Gilles Müller	60	6
AUS	Alex de Minaur	80	7
USA	Denis Kudla	84	8

- ^{1} Rankings are as of July 2, 2018

=== Other entrants ===
The following players received wildcards into the singles main draw:

- (United States) Christian Harrison
- (Chinese Taipei) Jason Jung
- (United States) Donald Young

The following player received entry using a protected ranking:

- (Australia) James Duckworth

The following players received entry from the qualifying draw:

- (United States) JC Aragone
- (Australia) Alex Bolt
- (Dominican Republic) Víctor Estrella Burgos
- (Australia) Bernard Tomic

=== Withdrawals ===
Before the tournament

- (France) Pierre-Hugues Herbert → replaced by (France) Nicolas Mahut
- (United States) John Isner → replaced by (Spain) Marcel Granollers
- (Kazakhstan) Mikhail Kukushkin → replaced by (India) Ramkumar Ramanathan
- (Slovakia) Lukáš Lacko → replaced by (Ukraine) Sergiy Stakhovsky
- (United States) Mackenzie McDonald → replaced by (United States) Tim Smyczek

== ATP doubles main-draw entrants ==
=== Seeds ===
Country	Player	Country	Player	Rank^{1}	Seed
USA	Nicholas Monroe	AUS	John-Patrick Smith	102	1
IND	Divij Sharan	USA	Jackson Withrow	115	2
IND	Purav Raja	GBR	Ken Skupski	125	3
ESA	Marcelo Arévalo	MEX	Miguel Ángel Reyes-Varela	133	4

- Rankings are as of July 2, 2018

=== Other entrants ===
The following pairs received wildcards into the doubles main draw:

- (Australia) Lleyton Hewitt / (Australia) Jordan Thompson
- (United States) Martin Redlicki / (United States) Evan Zhu

=== Withdrawals ===
During the tournament

- (France) Nicolas Mahut

== Champions ==
=== Singles ===
- (United States) Steve Johnson def. (India) Ramkumar Ramanathan, 7–5, 3–6, 6–2

=== Doubles ===
- (Israel) Jonathan Erlich / (New Zealand) Artem Sitak def. (El Salvador) Marcelo Arévalo / (Mexico) Miguel Ángel Reyes-Varela, 6–1, 6–2
