= 2016 Hall of Fame Tennis Championships =

- Date: July 11 – July 17
- Edition: 41st
- Category: ATP World Tour 250 series
- Surface: Grass / Outdoor
- Location: Newport, Rhode Island, United States
- Venue: International Tennis Hall of Fame

Champions

Singles
- (Croatia) Ivo Karlović

Doubles
- (Australia) Sam Groth / (Australia) Chris Guccione
← 2015 ·	Hall of Fame Tennis Championships	· 2017 →

The 2016 Hall of Fame Tennis Championships was a men's tennis tournament played on outdoor grass courts. It was the 41st edition of the Hall of Fame Tennis Championships, and part of the ATP World Tour 250 series of the 2016 ATP World Tour. It took place at the International Tennis Hall of Fame in Newport, Rhode Island, United States, from July 11 through July 17, 2016.

== Singles main draw entrants ==
=== Seeds ===
Country	Player	Rank^{1}	Seed
USA	Steve Johnson	29	1
CRO	Ivo Karlović	32	2
LUX	Gilles Müller	39	3
CYP	Marcos Baghdatis	40	4
~~CAN~~	~~Vasek Pospisil~~	~~44~~	~~5~~
FRA	Adrian Mannarino	55	6
ISR	Dudi Sela	63	7
USA	Donald Young	69	8

- ^{1} Rankings are as of June 27, 2016

=== Other entrants ===
The following players received wildcards into the singles main draw:

- (Australia) James Duckworth
- (United States) Stefan Kozlov
- (United States) Mackenzie McDonald

The following players received entry from the qualifying draw:

- (United States) Brian Baker
- (Canada) Frank Dancevic
- (United States) Alex Kuznetsov
- (Poland) Michał Przysiężny

The following player received entry as a lucky loser:

- (Israel) Amir Weintraub

=== Withdrawals ===
Before the tournament

- (United States) Taylor Fritz →replaced by (Japan) Yūichi Sugita
- (Japan) Tatsuma Ito →replaced by (Slovakia) Lukáš Lacko
- (Russia) Konstantin Kravchuk →replaced by (Switzerland) Marco Chiudinelli
- (Australia) John Millman →replaced by (United States) Austin Krajicek
- (Canada) Vasek Pospisil →replaced by (Israel) Amir Weintraub
- (United States) Sam Querrey →replaced by (United States) Dennis Novikov
- (Ukraine) Sergiy Stakhovsky →replaced by (United States) Ryan Harrison

== Doubles main draw entrants ==
=== Seeds ===
Country	Player	Country	Player	Rank^{1}	Seed
USA	Eric Butorac	USA	Scott Lipsky	83	1
AUS	Sam Groth	AUS	Chris Guccione	140	2
GBR	Ken Skupski	GBR	Neal Skupski	167	3
IND	Purav Raja	IND	Divij Sharan	200	4

- Rankings are as of June 27, 2016

=== Other entrants ===
The following pairs received wildcards into the doubles main draw:

- (United States) Austin Krajicek / (Mexico) Gerardo López Villaseñor
- (United States) Alex Lawson / (United States) Mackenzie McDonald

== Champions ==
=== Singles ===
- (Croatia) Ivo Karlović def. (Luxembourg) Gilles Müller, 6–7^{(2–7)}, 7–6^{(7–5)}, 7–6^{(14–12)}

=== Doubles ===
- (Australia) Sam Groth / (Australia) Chris Guccione def. (United Kingdom) Jonathan Marray / (Canada) Adil Shamasdin, 6–4, 6–3
