= 2016 Hall of Fame Tennis Championships – Singles =

Singles
- 2016 Hall of Fame Tennis Championships

Final
- Champion: (Croatia) Ivo Karlović
- Runner-up: (Luxembourg) Gilles Müller
- Score: 6–7^{(2–7)}, 7–6^{(7–5)}, 7–6^{(14–12)}

Details
- Draw: 28 (4 Q / 3 WC )
- Seeds: 8

Events
Singles	Doubles
- Hall of Fame Tennis Championships

Rajeev Ram was the defending champion, but lost in the second round to Dudi Sela.

Ivo Karlović won the title, defeating Gilles Müller in the final, 6–7^{(2–7)}, 7–6^{(7–5)}, 7–6^{(14–12)}.

== Seeds ==
The top four seeds receive a bye into the second round.

1. (United States) Steve Johnson (quarterfinals)
2. (Croatia) Ivo Karlović (champion)
3. (Luxembourg) Gilles Müller (final)
4. (Cyprus) Marcos Baghdatis (semifinals)
5. (Canada) Vasek Pospisil (withdrew)
6. (France) Adrian Mannarino (quarterfinals)
7. (Israel) Dudi Sela (quarterfinals)
8. (United States) Donald Young (semifinals)

== Draw ==
Key

- Q = Qualifier
- WC = Wild card
- LL = Lucky loser
- Alt = Alternate
- ITF = ITF entry
- PR = Protected ranking
- SR = Special ranking
- SE = Special exempt
- JE = Junior exempt
- JR = Junior Accelerator Programme entrant
- CO = College Accelerator Programme entrant
- NG = Next Gen Accelerator Program entrant
- w/o = Walkover
- r = Retired
- d = Defaulted

=== Finals ===
Semifinals
8	(United States) Donald Young	3	4
3	(Luxembourg) Gilles Müller	6	6
4	(Cyprus) Marcos Baghdatis	6^{3}	6^{6}
2	(Croatia) Ivo Karlović	7^{7}	7^{8}

Final
3	(Luxembourg) Gilles Müller	7^{7}	6^{5}	6^{12}
2	(Croatia) Ivo Karlović	6^{2}	7^{7}	7^{14}

=== Top half ===
First round
LL	(Israel) A Weintraub	6	3	2
(Japan) Y Sugita	4	6	6
(Germany) B Becker	1	2
WC	(United States) S Kozlov	6	6
(United States) J Donaldson	1	3
8	(United States) D Young	6	6
(United States) D Novikov	6^{3}	3
(Dominican Republic) V Estrella Burgos	7^{7}	6
Q	(Poland) M Przysiężny	6^{2}	4
(Australia) S Groth	7^{7}	6
WC	(Australia) J Duckworth	7^{7}	6^{5}	6^{4}
6	(France) A Mannarino	6^{3}	7^{7}	7^{7}

Second round
1	(United States) S Johnson	6	6
(Japan) Y Sugita	1	4
WC	(United States) S Kozlov	0	4
8	(United States) D Young	6	6
3	(Luxembourg) G Müller	7^{9}	6
(Dominican Republic) V Estrella Burgos	6^{7}	4
(Australia) S Groth	6^{6}	3
6	(France) A Mannarino	7^{8}	6

Quarterfinals
1	(United States) S Johnson	2	3
8	(United States) D Young	6	6
3	(Luxembourg) G Müller	2	6	6
6	(France) A Mannarino	6	1	2

Semifinals
8	(United States) D Young	3	4
3	(Luxembourg) G Müller	6	6

=== Bottom half ===
First round
7	(Israel) D Sela	6	6
(Slovakia) L Lacko	3	2
(United States) R Ram	6	6
WC	(United States) M McDonald	2	3
Q	(United States) B Baker	6	3	6
(United States) A Krajicek	2	6	2
Q	(United States) A Kuznetsov	4	6^{6}
(Switzerland) M Chiudinelli	6	7^{8}
(Australia) J-P Smith	6	6
(Australia) J Thompson	4	4
Q	(Canada) F Dancevic	6	6
(United States) R Harrison	4	4

Second round
7	(Israel) D Sela	6	6
(United States) R Ram	3	4
Q	(United States) B Baker	4	3
4	(Cyprus) M Baghdatis	6	6
(Switzerland) M Chiudinelli	1	6	6
(Australia) J-P Smith	6	3	3
Q	(Canada) F Dancevic	6	6^{5}	4
2	(Croatia) I Karlović	3	7^{7}	6

Quarterfinals
7	(Israel) D Sela	2	5
4	(Cyprus) M Baghdatis	6	7
(Switzerland) M Chiudinelli	3	4
2	(Croatia) I Karlović	6	6

Semifinals
4	(Cyprus) M Baghdatis	6^{3}	6^{6}
2	(Croatia) I Karlović	7^{7}	7^{8}

== Qualifying ==
=== Seeds ===
1. (Colombia) Alejandro Falla (first round)
2. (Israel) Amir Weintraub (qualifying competition, lucky loser)
3. (Australia) Matthew Barton (qualifying competition)
4. (United Kingdom) Brydan Klein (qualifying competition)
5. (Canada) Frank Dancevic (qualified)
6. (United States) Ernesto Escobedo (first round)
7. (Poland) Michał Przysiężny (qualified)
8. (Czech Republic) Jan Hernych (first round, retired)

=== Qualifiers ===
1. (United States) Alex Kuznetsov
2. (Canada) Frank Dancevic
3. (Poland) Michał Przysiężny
4. (United States) Brian Baker

=== Lucky loser ===
1. (Israel) Amir Weintraub

=== Qualifying draw ===
==== First qualifier ====
First round
1	(Colombia) Alejandro Falla	3	4
(United Kingdom) Daniel Cox	6	6
(United States) Alex Kuznetsov	7^{7}	6^{3}	6
6	(United States) Ernesto Escobedo	6^{3}	7^{7}	4

Qualifying competition
(United Kingdom) Daniel Cox	6^{7}	6	4
(United States) Alex Kuznetsov	7^{9}	4	6

==== Second qualifier ====
First round
2	(Israel) Amir Weintraub	7^{7}	7^{9}
(United States) Evan King	6^{5}	6^{7}
WC	(United States) Reilly Opelka	6^{3}	7^{7}	0
5	(Canada) Frank Dancevic	7^{7}	6^{4}	6

Qualifying competition
2	(Israel) Amir Weintraub	6^{3}	7^{7}	4
5	(Canada) Frank Dancevic	7^{7}	6^{5}	6

==== Third qualifier ====
First round
3	(Australia) Matthew Barton	7^{7}	6
(Switzerland) Adrien Bossel	6^{1}	3
(United States) Eric Quigley	4	3
7	(Poland) Michał Przysiężny	6	6

Qualifying competition
3	(Australia) Matthew Barton	3	3
7	(Poland) Michał Przysiężny	6	6

==== Fourth qualifier ====
First round
4	(United Kingdom) Brydan Klein	7^{7}	6
(United States) Michael Mmoh	6^{3}	2
WC	(United States) Brian Baker	6	0
8	(Czech Republic) Jan Hernych	3	0^{r}

Qualifying competition
4	(United Kingdom) Brydan Klein	6^{3}	4
WC	(United States) Brian Baker	7^{7}	6
