= 2018 Hall of Fame Tennis Championships – Singles =

Singles
- 2018 Hall of Fame Tennis Championships

Final
- Champion: (United States) Steve Johnson
- Runner-up: (India) Ramkumar Ramanathan
- Score: 7–5, 3–6, 6–2

Details
- Draw: 28 (4 Q / 3 WC )
- Seeds: 8

Events
Singles	Doubles
- Hall of Fame Tennis Championships

John Isner was the defending champion, but withdrew before the tournament began.

Steve Johnson won his fourth career ATP World Tour title, defeating Ramkumar Ramanathan in the final, 7–5, 3–6, 6–2. Ramanathan was making his first appearance in a ATP Tour final.

== Seeds ==
The top four seeds receive a bye into the second round.

1. (France) Adrian Mannarino (quarterfinals)
2. (Germany) Mischa Zverev (second round)
3. (United States) Steve Johnson (champion)
4. (Australia) Matthew Ebden (second round)
5. (United States) Ryan Harrison (first round, retired)
6. (Luxembourg) Gilles Müller (second round)
7. (Australia) Alex de Minaur (first round)
8. (United States) Denis Kudla (second round)

== Draw ==
Key

- Q = Qualifier
- WC = Wild card
- LL = Lucky loser
- Alt = Alternate
- ITF = ITF entry
- PR = Protected ranking
- SR = Special ranking
- SE = Special exempt
- JE = Junior exempt
- JR = Junior Accelerator Programme entrant
- CO = College Accelerator Programme entrant
- NG = Next Gen Accelerator Program entrant
- w/o = Walkover
- r = Retired
- d = Defaulted

=== Finals ===
Semifinals
(Spain) Marcel Granollers	3	3
3	(United States) Steve Johnson	6	6
(United States) Tim Smyczek	4	5
(India) Ramkumar Ramanathan	6	7

Final
3	(United States) Steve Johnson	7	3	6
(India) Ramkumar Ramanathan	5	6	2

=== Top half ===
First round
PR	(Australia) J Duckworth	4	3
(Australia) J Thompson	6	6
Q	(United States) JC Aragone	6^{6}	0
(Spain) M Granollers	7^{8}	6
(Cyprus) M Baghdatis	6^{5}	3
6	(Luxembourg) G Müller	7^{7}	6
WC	(United States) C Harrison	6	4	7
Q	(Australia) A Bolt	3	6	5
Q	(Australia) B Tomic	3	6	2
(Israel) D Sela	6	1	6
(Croatia) I Karlović	6^{2}	7^{7}	7
7	(Australia) A de Minaur	7^{7}	6^{3}	5

Second round
1	(France) A Mannarino	6	7^{7}
(Australia) J Thompson	2	6^{4}
(Spain) M Granollers	7	7^{7}
6	(Luxembourg) G Müller	5	6^{4}
3	(United States) S Johnson	6	6
WC	(United States) C Harrison	3	1
(Israel) D Sela	7^{8}	6^{4}	6
(Croatia) I Karlović	6^{6}	7^{7}	2

Quarterfinals
1	(France) A Mannarino	3	1
(Spain) M Granollers	6	6
3	(United States) S Johnson	6	6
(Israel) D Sela	2	3

Semifinals
(Spain) M Granollers	3	3
3	(United States) S Johnson	6	6

=== Bottom half ===
First round
5	(United States) R Harrison	2	0^{r}
(France) N Mahut	6	2
(Ukraine) S Stakhovsky	4	6	3
WC	(Chinese Taipei) J Jung	6	3	6
(United States) B Fratangelo	3	6	4
(United States) T Smyczek	6	2	6
8	(United States) D Kudla	6	6
(Belgium) R Bemelmans	3	4
(India) R Ramanathan	6	6
Q	(Dominican Republic) V Estrella Burgos	4	1
WC	(United States) D Young	6^{5}	1
(Canada) V Pospisil	7^{7}	6

Second round
(France) N Mahut	4	4
WC	(Chinese Taipei) J Jung	6	6
(United States) T Smyczek	6	6
4	(Australia) M Ebden	3	3
8	(United States) D Kudla	6	3	4
(India) R Ramanathan	4	6	6
(Canada) V Pospisil	4	6	7
2	(Germany) M Zverev	6	3	5

Quarterfinals
WC	(Chinese Taipei) J Jung	1	7	4
(United States) T Smyczek	6	5	6
(India) R Ramanathan	7	6
(Canada) V Pospisil	5	2

Semifinals
(United States) T Smyczek	4	5
(India) R Ramanathan	6	7

== Qualifying ==
=== Seeds ===
1. (El Salvador) Marcelo Arévalo (first round)
2. (Germany) Matthias Bachinger (qualifying competition)
3. (India) Prajnesh Gunneswaran (first round)
4. (Egypt) Mohamed Safwat (first round)
5. (Australia) Bernard Tomic (qualified)
6. (Dominican Republic) Víctor Estrella Burgos (qualified)
7. (United States) Evan King (first round)
8. (Australia) Alex Bolt (qualified)

=== Qualifiers ===
1. (Dominican Republic) Víctor Estrella Burgos
2. (United States) JC Aragone
3. (Australia) Bernard Tomic
4. (Australia) Alex Bolt

=== Qualifying draw ===
==== First qualifier ====
First round
1	(El Salvador) Marcelo Arévalo	1	7^{7}	5
(Australia) John-Patrick Smith	6	6^{2}	7
(Germany) Dominik Köpfer	2	3
6	(Dominican Republic) Víctor Estrella Burgos	6	6

Qualifying competition
(Australia) John-Patrick Smith	6	5	5
6	(Dominican Republic) Víctor Estrella Burgos	3	7	7

==== Second qualifier ====
First round
2	(Germany) Matthias Bachinger	5	7	6
WC	(United States) William Blumberg	7	5	2
(United States) JC Aragone	6	6
7	(United States) Evan King	3	2

Qualifying competition
2	(Germany) Matthias Bachinger	6^{2}	7^{8}	0
(United States) JC Aragone	7^{7}	6^{6}	6

==== Third qualifier ====
First round
3	(India) Prajnesh Gunneswaran	4	7	4
(Italy) Alessandro Bega	6	5	6
(United States) Austin Krajicek	6^{3}	4
5	(Australia) Bernard Tomic	7^{7}	6

Qualifying competition
(Italy) Alessandro Bega	4	3
5	(Australia) Bernard Tomic	6	6

==== Fourth qualifier ====
First round
4	(Egypt) Mohamed Safwat	3	3
WC	(United States) Alex Rybakov	6	6
(Canada) Frank Dancevic	3	4
8	(Australia) Alex Bolt	6	6

Qualifying competition
WC	(United States) Alex Rybakov	3	6	3
8	(Australia) Alex Bolt	6	3	6
