= 2017 Hall of Fame Tennis Championships – Singles =

Singles
- 2017 Hall of Fame Tennis Championships

Final
- Champion: (United States) John Isner
- Runner-up: (Australia) Matthew Ebden
- Score: 6–3, 7–6^{(7–4)}

Details
- Draw: 28 (4 Q / 3 WC )
- Seeds: 8

Events
Singles	Doubles
- Hall of Fame Tennis Championships

Ivo Karlović was the defending champion, but lost in the quarterfinals to Peter Gojowczyk.

John Isner won his third title in Newport, defeating Matthew Ebden in the final, 6–3, 7–6^{(7–4)}.

== Seeds ==
The top four seeds receive a bye into the second round.

1. (United States) John Isner (champion)
2. (Croatia) Ivo Karlović (quarterfinals)
3. (France) Adrian Mannarino (second round)
4. (France) Pierre-Hugues Herbert (quarterfinals)
5. (Dominican Republic) Víctor Estrella Burgos (first round)
6. (Slovakia) Lukáš Lacko (second round)
7. (United States) Tennys Sandgren (first round)
8. (Ukraine) Illya Marchenko (first round)

== Draw ==
Key

- Q = Qualifier
- WC = Wild card
- LL = Lucky loser
- Alt = Alternate
- ITF = ITF entry
- PR = Protected ranking
- SR = Special ranking
- SE = Special exempt
- JE = Junior exempt
- JR = Junior Accelerator Programme entrant
- CO = College Accelerator Programme entrant
- NG = Next Gen Accelerator Program entrant
- w/o = Walkover
- r = Retired
- d = Defaulted

=== Finals ===
Semifinals
1	(United States) John Isner	6	6
(United States) Bjorn Fratangelo	2	4
Q	(Australia) Matthew Ebden	6	6
(Germany) Peter Gojowczyk	3	3

Final
1	(United States) John Isner	6	7^{7}
Q	(Australia) Matthew Ebden	3	6^{4}

=== Top half ===
First round
Q	(United States) A Krajicek	7^{7}	6^{2}	3
Q	(Australia) S Groth	6^{3}	7^{7}	6
(United States) D Novikov	6	6
(Switzerland) M Chiudinelli	1	3
Q	(Canada) F Dancevic	6^{5}	6	6
7	(United States) T Sandgren	7^{7}	3	2
(Spain) A Menéndez Maceiras	6	7^{7}
(United States) S Kozlov	2	6^{5}
WC	(United States) M Mmoh	1	2
(Australia) A Santillan	6	6
(United States) B Fratangelo	7^{7}	1	6
8	(Ukraine) I Marchenko	6^{2}	6	4

Second round
1	(United States) J Isner	6	6
Q	(Australia) S Groth	2	4
(United States) D Novikov	6	6
Q	(Canada) F Dancevic	3	2
4	(France) P-H Herbert	7	2	6
(Spain) A Menéndez Maceiras	5	6	3
(Australia) A Santillan	6^{3}	6	1
(United States) B Fratangelo	7^{7}	3	6

Quarterfinals
1	(United States) J Isner	6	6
(United States) D Novikov	4	4
4	(France) P-H Herbert	2	7	4
(United States) B Fratangelo	6	5	6

Semifinals
1	(United States) J Isner	6	6
(United States) B Fratangelo	2	4

=== Bottom half ===
First round
6	(Slovakia) L Lacko	7^{9}	6
(United States) R Opelka	6^{7}	4
Q	(Australia) M Ebden	6	6
WC	(United States) R Ram	1	4
(United States) T Fritz	3	3
(Germany) T Kamke	6	6
5	(Dominican Republic) V Estrella Burgos	4	4
(Russia) K Kravchuk	6	6
(Germany) P Gojowczyk	6	6
WC	(United States) T-S Kwiatkowski	3	3
(United States) D Kudla	6	5	6
(United States) M Krueger	4	7	0

Second round
6	(Slovakia) L Lacko	1	6^{2}
Q	(Australia) M Ebden	6	7^{7}
(Germany) T Kamke	7^{7}	7
3	(France) A Mannarino	6^{5}	5
(Russia) K Kravchuk	6	4	4
(Germany) P Gojowczyk	2	6	6
(United States) D Kudla	4	4
2	(Croatia) I Karlović	6	6

Quarterfinals
Q	(Australia) M Ebden	4	7^{8}	6
(Germany) T Kamke	6	6^{6}	4
(Germany) P Gojowczyk	7^{7}	6^{1}	7^{7}
2	(Croatia) I Karlović	6^{5}	7^{7}	6^{4}

Semifinals
Q	(Australia) M Ebden	6	6
(Germany) P Gojowczyk	3	3

== Qualifying ==
=== Seeds ===
1. (India) Ramkumar Ramanathan (qualifying competition)
2. (Australia) Sam Groth (qualified)
3. (United States) Tim Smyczek (first round)
4. (Australia) Andrew Whittington (qualifying competition)
5. (Republic of Ireland) James McGee (first round)
6. (Australia) John-Patrick Smith (qualifying competition)
7. (United Kingdom) Brydan Klein (first round)
8. (El Salvador) Marcelo Arévalo (first round)

=== Qualifiers ===
1. (Australia) Matthew Ebden
2. (Australia) Sam Groth
3. (United States) Austin Krajicek
4. (Canada) Frank Dancevic

=== Qualifying draw ===
==== First qualifier ====
First round
1	(India) Ramkumar Ramanathan	6	3	6
WC	(United States) Christopher Eubanks	4	6	1
(Australia) Matthew Ebden	3	6	6
7	(United Kingdom) Brydan Klein	6	0	4

Qualifying competition
1	(India) Ramkumar Ramanathan	6	1	5
(Australia) Matthew Ebden	4	6	7

==== Second qualifier ====
First round
2	(Australia) Sam Groth	6	6
(Italy) Alessandro Bega	2	3
WC	(United States) William Blumberg	7^{7}	6
5	(Republic of Ireland) James McGee	6^{5}	4

Qualifying competition
2	(Australia) Sam Groth	6	6
WC	(United States) William Blumberg	2	4

==== Third qualifier ====
First round
3	(United States) Tim Smyczek	6^{4}	3
(United States) Austin Krajicek	7^{7}	6
(Australia) Alex Bolt	4	3
6	(Australia) John-Patrick Smith	6	6

Qualifying competition
(United States) Austin Krajicek	6	6
6	(Australia) John-Patrick Smith	4	4

==== Fourth qualifier ====
First round
4	(Australia) Andrew Whittington	7	6
(United States) Evan King	5	0
(Canada) Frank Dancevic	3	6	6
8	(El Salvador) Marcelo Arévalo	6	1	4

Qualifying competition
4	(Australia) Andrew Whittington	6	3	6^{9}
(Canada) Frank Dancevic	3	6	7^{11}
