= 1992 Miller Lite Hall of Fame Tennis Championships =

1992 Miller Lite Hall of Fame Championships
- Date: July 6–12
- Edition: 19th
- Category: World Series
- Draw: 32S / 16D
- Prize money: $175,000
- Surface: Grass / outdoor
- Location: Newport, Rhode Island, U.S.
- Venue: Newport Casino

Champions

Singles
- (United States) Bryan Shelton

Doubles
- (South Africa) Royce Deppe / (Czechoslovakia) David Rikl
- Hall of Fame Open

The 1992 Miller Lite Hall of Fame Tennis Championships, was a men's tennis tournament held on outdoor grass courts at the Newport Casino in Newport, Rhode Island, United States. This event was part of the World Series of the 1992 ATP Tour and marked the 19th edition of the tournament, which was held from July 6 through July 12, 1992. Unseeded Bryan Shelton won his second consecutive singles title at the event.

== Finals ==
=== Singles ===
(United States) Bryan Shelton defeated (Austria) Alex Antonitsch 6–4, 6–4

- It was Shelton's first singles title of the year and the second, and last, of his career.

=== Doubles ===
(South Africa) Royce Deppe / (Czechoslovakia) David Rikl defeated (United States) Paul Annacone / (United States) David Wheaton 6–4, 6–4
