= 2016 Hall of Fame Tennis Championships – Doubles =

Doubles
- 2016 Hall of Fame Tennis Championships

Final
- Champions: (Australia) Sam Groth (Australia) Chris Guccione
- Runners-up: (United Kingdom) Jonathan Marray (Canada) Adil Shamasdin
- Score: 6–4, 6–3

Events
Singles	Doubles
← 2015 ·	Hall of Fame Tennis Championships	· 2017 →

Jonathan Marray and Aisam-ul-Haq Qureshi were the defending champions, but Qureshi chose to compete in Hamburg instead. Marray played alongside Adil Shamasdin, but lost in the final to Sam Groth and Chris Guccione, 4–6, 3–6.

== Seeds ==
1. (United States) Eric Butorac / (United States) Scott Lipsky (first round)
2. (Australia) Sam Groth / (Australia) Chris Guccione (champions)
3. (United Kingdom) Ken Skupski / (United Kingdom) Neal Skupski (semifinals)
4. (India) Purav Raja / (India) Divij Sharan (semifinals)

== Draw ==
=== Key ===
- Q = Qualifier
- WC = Wild card
- LL = Lucky loser
- Alt = Alternate
- ITF = ITF entry
- PR = Protected ranking
- SR = Special ranking
- SE = Special exempt
- JE = Junior exempt
- JR = Junior Accelerator Programme entrant
- CO = College Accelerator Programme entrant
- NG = Next Gen Accelerator Program entrant
- w/o = Walkover
- r = Retired
- d = Defaulted

=== Draw ===
First round
1	(United States) E Butorac (United States) S Lipsky	3	6^{14}
(United Kingdom) B Klein (Japan) Y Sugita	6	7^{16}
(United Kingdom) J Marray (Canada) A Shamasdin	6	6^{7}	[10]
WC	(United States) A Krajicek (Mexico) G López Villaseñor	3	7^{9}	[7]
4	(India) P Raja (India) D Sharan	2	6	[10]
PR	(Dominican Republic) V Estrella Burgos (United States) JP Fruttero	6	3	[6]
(Cyprus) M Baghdatis (Luxembourg) G Müller	6	6
(Uruguay) A Behar (India) J Nedunchezhiyan	2	3
(United States) B Baker (United States) R Ram	6	7
(South Africa) D O'Brien (United States) D Young	3	5
WC	(United States) A Lawson (United States) M McDonald	6^{4}	6^{7}
3	(United Kingdom) K Skupski (United Kingdom) N Skupski	7^{7}	7^{9}
(Switzerland) M Chiudinelli (Germany) F Moser	4	6	[10]
PR	(Germany) A Satschko (Germany) S Stadler	6	2	[5]
(Israel) D Sela (Australia) J Thompson	3	4
2	(Australia) S Groth (Australia) C Guccione	6	6

Quarterfinals
(United Kingdom) B Klein (Japan) Y Sugita	1	2
(United Kingdom) J Marray (Canada) A Shamasdin	6	6
4	(India) P Raja (India) D Sharan	6	6
(Cyprus) M Baghdatis (Luxembourg) G Müller	4	4
(United States) B Baker (United States) R Ram	6^{4}	6	[6]
3	(United Kingdom) K Skupski (United Kingdom) N Skupski	7^{7}	3	[10]
(Switzerland) M Chiudinelli (Germany) F Moser	3	4
2	(Australia) S Groth (Australia) C Guccione	6	6

Semifinals
(United Kingdom) J Marray (Canada) A Shamasdin	6	6
4	(India) P Raja (India) D Sharan	3	4
3	(United Kingdom) K Skupski (United Kingdom) N Skupski	6^{4}	5
2	(Australia) S Groth (Australia) C Guccione	7^{7}	7

Final
(United Kingdom) J Marray (Canada) A Shamasdin	4	3
2	(Australia) S Groth (Australia) C Guccione	6	6
