= 2018 Hall of Fame Tennis Championships – Doubles =

Doubles
- 2018 Hall of Fame Tennis Championships

Final
- Champions: (Israel) Jonathan Erlich; (New Zealand) Artem Sitak
- Runners-up: (El Salvador) Marcelo Arévalo; (Mexico) Miguel Ángel Reyes-Varela
- Score: 6–1, 6–2

Events
| Singles | Doubles |
- Hall of Fame Tennis Championships

Aisam-ul-Haq Qureshi and Rajeev Ram were the defending champions but Ram chose not to participate and Qureshi chose to compete in Båstad instead.

Jonathan Erlich and Artem Sitak won the title, defeating Marcelo Arévalo and Miguel Ángel Reyes-Varela in the final, 6–1, 6–2.

== Seeds ==
1. (United States) Nicholas Monroe / (Australia) John-Patrick Smith (first round)
2. (India) Divij Sharan / (United States) Jackson Withrow (semifinals)
3. (India) Purav Raja / (United Kingdom) Ken Skupski (quarterfinals)
4. (El Salvador) Marcelo Arévalo / (Mexico) Miguel Ángel Reyes-Varela (final)

== Draw ==
Key

- Q = Qualifier
- WC = Wild card
- LL = Lucky loser
- Alt = Alternate
- ITF = ITF entry
- PR = Protected ranking
- SR = Special ranking
- SE = Special exempt
- JE = Junior exempt
- JR = Junior Accelerator Programme entrant
- CO = College Accelerator Programme entrant
- NG = Next Gen Accelerator Program entrant
- w/o = Walkover
- r = Retired
- d = Defaulted

=== Draw ===
First round

Quarterfinals

Semifinals

Final

1
- (United States) N Monroe
- (Australia) J-P Smith
7
1
[8]

(United States) A Krajicek
(India) J Nedunchezhiyan
5
6
[10]

(United States) A Krajicek
(India) J Nedunchezhiyan
6
7^{7}

(United States) J Cerretani
(India) L Paes
6
6

- (United States) J Cerretani
- (India) L Paes
3
6^{3}

- (United Kingdom) L Bambridge
- (United Kingdom) J O'Mara
4
3

- (United States) A Krajicek
- (India) J Nedunchezhiyan
7
5
[11]

4
(El Salvador) M Arévalo
(Mexico) MÁ Reyes-Varela
7^{7}
6

4
(El Salvador) M Arévalo
(Mexico) MÁ Reyes-Varela
5
7
[13]

- (Cyprus) M Baghdatis
- (Germany) M Zverev
6^{2}
4

4
(El Salvador) M Arévalo
(Mexico) MÁ Reyes-Varela
w/o

PR
- (Australia) A de Minaur
- (Australia) J Duckworth
4
5

- (France) N Mahut
- (France) A Mannarino

(France) N Mahut
(France) A Mannarino
6
7

4
- (El Salvador) M Arévalo
- (Mexico) MÁ Reyes-Varela
1
2

WC
- (Australia) L Hewitt
- (Australia) J Thompson
4
4

(Israel) J Erlich
(New Zealand) A Sitak
6
6

(Israel) J Erlich
(New Zealand) A Sitak
6
6

(Israel) J Erlich
(New Zealand) A Sitak
4
6
[10]

- (Belgium) R Bemelmans
- (United States) D Kudla
5
4

3
- (India) P Raja
- (United Kingdom) K Skupski
6
3
[8]

3
(India) P Raja
(United Kingdom) K Skupski
7
6

(Israel) J Erlich
(New Zealand) A Sitak
6
6

- (Spain) G Granollers
- (Spain) M Granollers
0
6
[6]

2
- (India) D Sharan
- (United States) J Withrow
3
4

(Australia) M Ebden
(Ukraine) S Stakhovsky
6
4
[10]

- (Australia) M Ebden
- (Ukraine) S Stakhovsky
6^{4}
3

WC
- (United States) Ma Redlicki
- (United States) E Zhu
3
3

2
(India) D Sharan
(United States) J Withrow
7^{7}
6

2
(India) D Sharan
(United States) J Withrow
6
6
