= Gerardo López Villaseñor =

Mexican tennis player (born 1995)

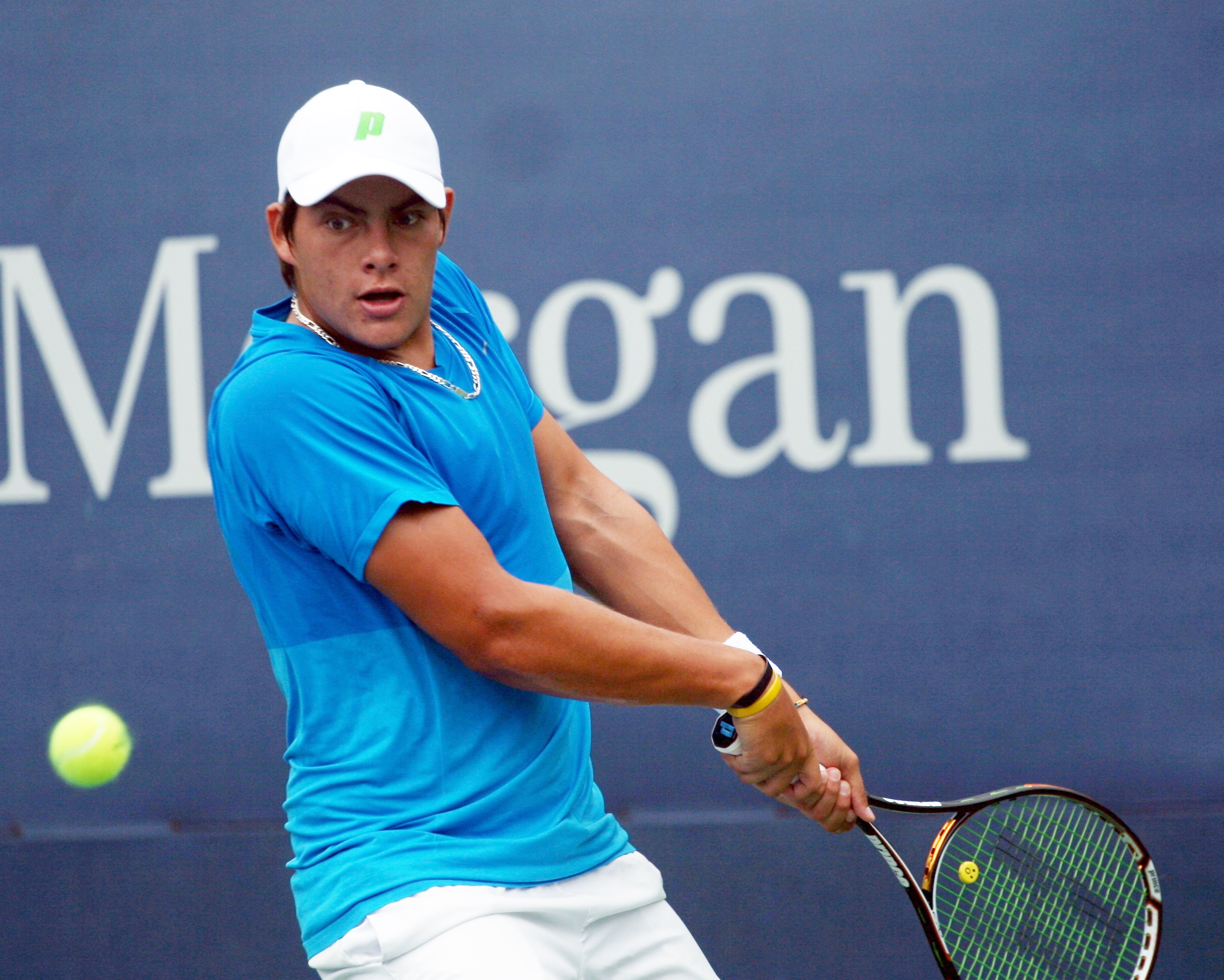
- López Villaseñor in 2013
- Country (sports): Mexico
- Born: 12 May 1995 (age 30) Puerto Vallarta, Jalisco, Mexico
- Height: 6 ft 3 in (1.91 m)
- Turned pro: 2018
- Plays: Right-handed (two handed-backhand)
- Coach: Dario Bogni
- Prize money: $66,013

Singles
- Career record: 5–7 (at ATP Tour level, Grand Slam level, and in Davis Cup)
- Career titles: 0
- Highest ranking: No. 505 (17 February 2020)

Doubles
- Career record: 0–4
- Career titles: 0
- Highest ranking: No. 641 (28 January 2019)
- Last updated on: 27 February 2023.

Gerardo López Villaseñor (Latin American Spanish: [xeˈɾaɾðo ˈlopes βiʝaseˈɲoɾ]; (Note: In isolation, Villaseñor is pronounced [biʝaseˈɲoɾ].) born 12 May 1995) is an inactive Mexican professional tennis player. He has a career-high ATP ranking of 505 achieved on 17 February 2020.

On the junior tour, has a career high ITF junior ranking of 138 achieved in September 2013.

López Villaseñor made his debut ATP main draw debut in doubles at the 2016 Hall of Fame Tennis Championships. Playing in the doubles with Austin Krajicek, they lost in the first round to Jonathan Marray and Adil Shamasdin.

He made his singles main draw debut at the 2019 Acapulco Open as a wildcard and was defeated in the first round by Steve Johnson. He also lost the following year as a wildcard in the first round at the 2020 Acapulco Open to Marcos Giron.
