= Steve Johnson (tennis) =

American tennis player (born 1989)

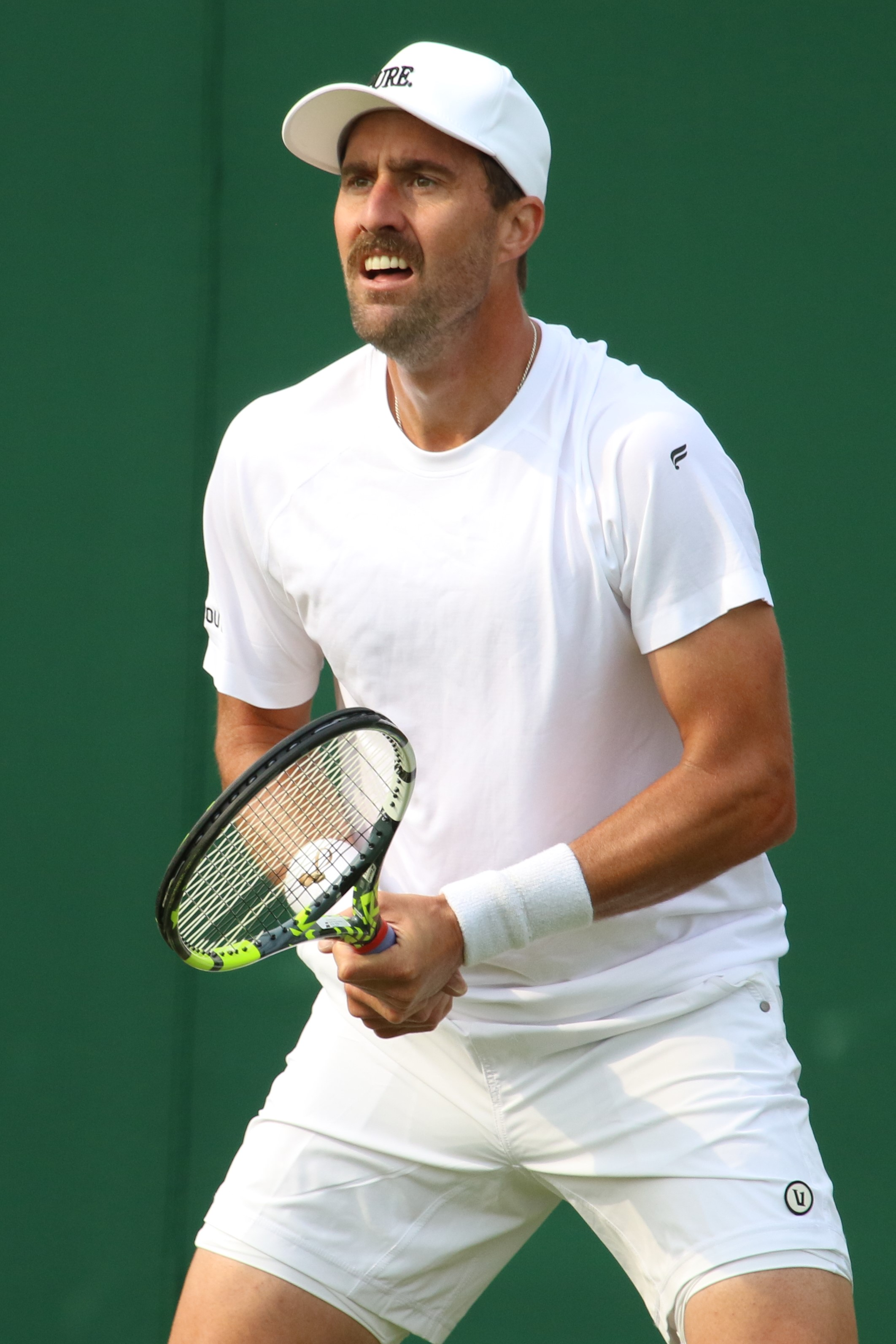
- Johnson at the 2023 Wimbledon Championships
- Country (sports): United States
- Residence: Redondo Beach, California, U.S.
- Born: December 24, 1989 (age 36) Orange, California, U.S.
- Height: 6 ft 2 in (1.88 m)
- Turned pro: 2012
- Retired: March 2024
- Plays: Right-handed (two-handed backhand)
- College: University of Southern California
- Coach: Peter Smith, Marc Lucero
- Prize money: US $8,062,893
- Official website: steviejohnsontennis.com

Singles
- Career record: 197–204
- Career titles: 4
- Highest ranking: No. 21 (25 July 2016)

Grand Slam singles results
- Australian Open: 3R (2015, 2016)
- French Open: 3R (2015, 2017, 2018, 2021)
- Wimbledon: 4R (2016)
- US Open: 3R (2012)

Other tournaments
- Olympic Games: QF (2016)

Doubles
- Career record: 104–107
- Career titles: 2
- Highest ranking: No. 39 (May 23, 2016)

Grand Slam doubles results
- Australian Open: 3R (2020)
- French Open: 3R (2018)
- Wimbledon: 2R (2015)
- US Open: SF (2015, 2021)

Other doubles tournaments
- Olympic Games: Bronze (2016)

Grand Slam mixed doubles results
- US Open: QF (2011)

Team competitions
- Davis Cup: SF (2018)
Olympic medal record
Men's tennis
Representing United States
Olympic Games
Bronze medal – third place	2016 Rio de Janeiro	Doubles

Steve Johnson Jr. (born December 24, 1989) is an American former professional tennis player.

He had a career-high singles ranking of world No. 21 achieved on July 25, 2016, and a doubles ranking of world No. 39 achieved on May 23, 2016. For one week in August 2016, Johnson was the top-ranked American in men's singles. He won four ATP Tour and nine ATP Challenger Tour titles, one at Nottingham on grass, twice at Houston on clay, and one at Newport on grass. He won a bronze medal in men's doubles at the 2016 Olympics with fellow American Jack Sock.

Johnson played college tennis for the USC Trojans. He won the NCAA Men's Singles Championship in his junior and senior seasons (2011–2012), and he was a part of a Trojan team that won four consecutive NCAA Championships.

== Personal life ==
Johnson's father, Steve Johnson Sr. (died May 11, 2017, aged 58), was a tennis coach at the Rancho San Clemente Tennis and Fitness Club, and his mother, Michelle, is a mathematics professor. His older sister, Alison, is a graduate of Sonoma State University. Johnson has credited his father with his success in tennis: "He taught me pretty much everything I know. Since I can remember, it's always been me and him out there hitting balls, having a blast. It's really been amazing. I wouldn't change anything." Growing up, he idolized Pete Sampras and Andre Agassi. At USC, Johnson was coached by Peter Smith and majored in Human Performance, but left when he was three classes short of attaining his degree.

In July 2012, Johnson signed a clothing deal with Asics America and is represented by Sam Duvall at Lagardere Unlimited. He currently trains at the USTA Player Development Center West in Carson, California. Johnson is currently working with the USTA and travels with other Americans.

Johnson married Kendall Bateman at Maravilla Gardens in Camarillo, Ventura County in Southern California on April 21, 2018. Kendall is a former Trojan volleyball player.

== Junior tennis ==
Johnson's dad served as his coach in his early career. Johnson won four consecutive 18-under national team titles, becoming the first player in tournament history to be a member of four championship teams. Johnson contributed to a 6–1 victory over Texas in the 2005 final, a 6–1 triumph over Southern in 2006 and clinched Southern California's 4–3 win the next year over Southern. Some of Johnson's junior accomplishments include being the 2008 Kalamazoo Doubles finalist and winning the 2008 Southern California Sectional Boys 18 championship in straight sets over JT Sundling. This marked his fourth Sectionals title and near a clean sweep of all age divisions having won the 12s, 14s and 16s. He also has the distinction of being the only player to win the Triple Crown, singles and two doubles—twice. He also won nine Gold Balls. He was ranked the third-rated California senior tennis recruit (7th overall) in the country according to TennisRecruiting.net. Johnson clinched the title for Southern California at the 2007 Junior Davis Cup.

== High school tennis ==
Johnson is a 2008 graduate of Orange High School in Orange, California, and was coached by Pete Tavoularis. He won CIF singles championships in 2006 and 2007 and was named the Orange County and Los Angeles Player of the Year in both seasons. He is the only Southern Section tennis champion in the school's history. Johnson also made it a priority to play in as many team matches as possible. He missed just two because of junior tennis events and did not lose a set in team competition on his way to winning his second consecutive Golden West League title. Johnson beat future Stanford Cardinal Ryan Thacher of Harvard-Westlake High to win the Southern Section Individual Tournament when both were high school sophomores in 2006. His only high school loss of 2006 was a three-set defeat in the semifinals of the Ojai Tennis Tournament to eventual champion Jason Jung of West Torrance. In 2007, he was defeated in the finals by Andre Dome in another 3 set thriller at Ojai. He then defended his title by beating future UCLA Bruin Alex Brigham of Pacifica Christian High. The victories made Johnson the first back-to-back singles winner since Tom Leonard of Arcadia in 1965 and 1966. He also became the eighth player to repeat as champion and the fourth to win the title after losing the first set at love (Leonard in 1965, Barry Buss in 1982, and Phil Sheng in 1999 each won titles after losing the first set at love). Johnson was the Orange County boys tennis player of the year as a sophomore and junior at Orange, but opted to not play high school tennis his senior year.

== College tennis ==
Johnson chose to play college tennis for the University of Southern California. He said of his decision, "I chose USC because I felt like I had a great relationship with Peter Smith, USC Tennis Coach, and I got along with the team really well."

As a freshman, Johnson was selected to All-Pac-10 First Team, as well as being named the Pac-10 Doubles Team of the Year with Robert Farah. He also reached the final of the Pac-10 singles championship match and he won the ITA Regionals Doubles Championship with Farah.

As a sophomore, he was selected to represent the United States in the fourth annual Master'U BNP Paribas, an intercollegiate competition in which eight countries from around the world play for the title. He was also selected to the All-Pac-10 First Team and was the named the Pac-10 Doubles Team of the Year with Farah once again as well as winning the ITA Southwest Regionals doubles championship with Farah. As a sophomore, he won the ITA National Indoor championship.

As a junior, he captured the 2010–11 NCAA Singles Championship, defeating Rhyne Williams in the final. He also won the 2011 Pac-10 Singles and Doubles Title with Raymond Sarmiento. In addition, he was selected as the NCAA Tournament Most Outstanding Player and to the NCAA All-Tournament Team for singles.

In his senior season, he captured the 2011–2012 NCAA Singles Championship, defeating Kentucky's Eric Quigley in the final, overcoming a strained abdomen and shin splints and a bout of food poisoning to retain his title.

Johnson was named the Intercollegiate Tennis Association Player of the Year for the 2010–11 and 2011–2012 seasons, as well as the 2010–2011 and 2011–2012 Pac-12 Men's Player of the Year.

In his college career, he became a seven-time Intercollegiate Tennis Association (ITA) All-American, two-time NCAA Singles Champion, and he captured the team title for the Trojans in all four of his years there. Furthermore, he ended his college career with an unprecedented 72 match win streak. He has said that "the biggest thing that I have learned from college tennis is to play aggressive while playing within myself and to never give up, because every dual match could end up being decided on your court." These exploits led to Johnson's becoming the most decorated college player of all time.

== ITF Futures Circuit ==
Johnson has competed in 12 Futures tournaments in his career for singles, all of them being in the United States. He has been in 3 finals, winning two of them. He lost the 2011 Sacramento Futures tournament to Daniel Kosakowski in 3 sets. Later that same year, Johnson won consecutive tournaments in the Claremont and Costa Mesa futures tournaments respectively beating Darian King and Artem Sitak in straight sets. Johnson has competed in various Futures tournaments since 2006 as a high schooler, and he won his first match and earned his first point the following year. He has compiled an overall record of 23 wins and 10 losses on the Futures Tour.

== ATP Challenger Tour ==
Johnson has competed in 27 Challenger tournaments in his career for singles in the United States, Turkey, Canada, and France. He won his first challenger tournament in the Comerica Bank Challenger played in Aptos, California. He won it in the summer of 2012, before the 2012 US Open. In the finals, he defeated Robert Farah in straight sets, 6–3, 6–3, gaining 100 points, as well as A month after his win in Aptos, Stevie competed in 2 challenger tournaments in Turkey and France. He reached the semifinals in Izmir, Turkey, winning three matches along the way. In Orléans, France, Stevie reached the second round and lost to the no.2 seed David Goffin of Belgium. in a tightly contested match, with the final score being 7–5, 6–4. A couple of weeks later in the 2012 Tiburon Challenger, Stevie was ousted in the semifinals by Jack Sock 4–6, 6–7(4). Johnson competed in the 2012 Charlottesville Challenger but fell to Rhyne Williams in the Round of 16. Johnson planned on playing in the Knoxville Challenger as well as the JSM Challenger of Champaign–Urbana to finish the year, but a shoulder injury forced him to pull out. The shoulder injury also forced him to miss the Australian Open Wild Card Playoffs. Stevie has compiled an overall record of 32 wins and 18 losses on the Challenger Tour and has earned In doubles, Stevie has had equal success on the Challenger Tour, compiling an overall record of 13 wins and 8 losses including a title in Knoxville, Tennessee with Austin Krajicek in 2011. He also made it to the finals in the 2011 Tiburon challenger with Sam Querrey, but they lost 6–10 in the 3rd set super tie-breaker. In 2012, Stevie reached the semifinals in Tiburon partnered with Robert Farah, as the #1 seeds. Johnson played doubles in the 2013 Maui Challenger being seeded no.2 and reached the semifinals with his partner Alex Bogomolov Jr. Johnson played singles and doubles in the 2013 Sarasota Open. In singles, he lost in the quarter-finals to the eventual champion, Alex Kuznetsov, 2–6, 6–3, 1–6. In doubles, he partnered with Bradley Klahn, and they won three matches to reach the finals but lost 7–6(5), 6–7(3), 9–11. Johnson played three more clay challengers before the French Open and lost in the first round in each. After a successful French Open, Johnson won his second career challenger at the Aegon Nottingham Challenge defeating Ruben Bemelmans in the finals. Winning this tournament helped grant him a wild-card into Wimbledon. Johnson finished the 2013 Challenger Tour season 1–5. In his second challenger event of the 2014 season, Johnson won the 2014 Challenger of Dallas, dropping only one set throughout the tournament. He defeated fellow American Ryan Harrison along the way and Tunisian Malek Jaziri in the finals. After the match, he stated, "I was struggling with confidence a little before the start to this year, and to come out and win the tournament here makes it more special." One month later in the 2014 Irving Tennis Classic, Johnson beat three top-100 players along the way to reach the finals, where he lost to Lukáš Rosol. A win at the 2014 Open Guadeloupe Challenger Tour tournament boosted Johnson's singles ranking to a career-high No. 69 and gave him his fourth career challenger title. After taking a month off from competing in tournaments, Johnson's next challenger tournament was the BNP Paribas Primrose Bordeaux where he was the number two seed. He lost in the finals to number one seed Julien Benneteau. Johnson kicked off his grass court season as the number two seed in the 2014 Aegon Trophy where fell in the quarterfinals to Gilles Müller.

== ATP World Tour ==
=== 2011: Grand Slam debut ===
Johnson started the year in Indian Wells where he lost in the first round of qualifying in three tight sets to Frank Dancevic. Shortly after his college season, Johnson received a wildcard into the 2011 Farmers Classic, where he lost in the first round to Gilles Müller in three sets. Johnson then competed in qualifying of the 2011 Western & Southern Open. After scoring his first win over a top 100 player in the first round, Jérémy Chardy, he lost in the following round to Édouard Roger-Vasselin. Winning the 2011 individual NCAA championships, Johnson received a wildcard to the main draw of the 2011 US Open. He played his first career Grand Slam match against Alex Bogomolov Jr. and lost in five tight sets where he had a two sets to love lead.

In the 2011 Western & Southern Open, Johnson reached the quarterfinals partnered with Alex Bogomolov Jr., and along the way defeated the No. 2 doubles team of Mirnyi/Nestor, subsequently gaining 180 points. At the 2011 US Open, Johnson partnered with Denis Kudla but they lost in straight sets to Marcelo Melo and Bruno Soares.

=== 2012: First ATP win ===
Johnson received a wildcard into the 2012 SAP Open but lost in two tie-breakers to Steve Darcis. Johnson registered his first ATP win in a main draw against Donald Young in the 2012 BB&T Atlanta Open before losing to Sock in the second round. He received a wildcard into the 2012 Farmers Classic, but lost to Igor Sijsling in straight sets. Johnson received another wildcard into the 2012 Citi Open, but lost to Benjamin Becker in straight sets. Johnson reached the third round of the 2012 US Open, where he had received a wildcard for winning the individual NCAA championships once again. In the first round, Johnson beat Rajeev Ram and in the second round, Johnson advanced by defeating Ernests Gulbis. In the third round, Johnson lost to 13th seeded Richard Gasquet.

In the 2012 Campbell's Hall of Fame Tennis Championships, Johnson partnered with Denis Kudla, but they lost in the first round. Competing in the 2012 BB&T Atlanta Open, Johnson partnered with Sock, but they lost in a super tie-breaker in the first round. In the 2012 Farmers Classic, Johnson partnered up with Querrey, and they reached the semifinals. Next, in the 2012 Citi Open, Johnson reached the semifinals once again, partnered with Drew Courtney. In the 2012 US Open, Johnson received a wildcard to the main draw and partnered with Sock. In the first round they defeated the No. 1 doubles team of Mirnyi/Nestor. However they lost in the second round to František Čermák and Michal Mertiňák.

=== 2013: Australian Open and French Open debuts ===
In the 2013 Australian Open, Johnson won three qualifying matches to reach the main draw. In the first round of the main draw, he took tenth seed Nicolás Almagro the distance, but lost. Next, in the 2013 SAP Open, Johnson received a wild card to the main draw. In the first round, he defeated former top-20 player Ivo Karlović. In the second round, Johnson defeated Tim Smyczek, reaching his first quarterfinal. However, in the quarterfinals, Johnson lost to eventual finalist Tommy Haas. Overall, Johnson compiled a 5–13 record in singles. In doubles, Johnson attained a career-high ranking of No. 126. At the same tournament, the 2013 SAP Open, Johnson partnered with Sock, but they lost to the No. 1 doubles team of Mike and Bob Bryan. Johnson once again partnered with Sock in the U.S. Men's Clay Court Championships, and they reached the round of 16.

Johnson went to the 2013 French Open, qualifying for the first time and made it through to the main draw before losing in the first round to Albert Montañés, who had just won Nice the previous week. Receiving a wildcard into the maindraw of Wimbledon, Johnson lost a tight first round match to fellow American Bobby Reynolds. In the 2013 Citi Open, Johnson lost in the first round to Radek Štěpánek in straight sets. In the 2013 Winston-Salem Open, Johnson won three qualifying matches to reach the main draw and have a rematch with Bobby Reynolds. In the 2013 US Open, Johnson lost in the first round to German Tobias Kamke, failing to reach the third round as he had the previous year. Johnson and fellow American Michael Russell received a wild card in doubles, but fell in the first round.

=== 2014: First ATP semifinal ===
Steve kicked off the 2014 season by reaching the main draw of the 2014 Heineken Open as a lucky loser and beat former Australian Open runner up Marcos Baghdatis, and also defeated #4 seed Kevin Anderson to reach his second quarterfinal on tour. By winning the Australian Open Wildcard Playoffs a few weeks back, Johnson received a wildcard into the main draw of 2014 Australian Open. However, he lost in the first round to Frenchman Adrian Mannarino in five sets.

In the 2014 Delray Beach International Tennis Championships Johnson qualified for the main draw and beat Mikhail Kukushkin, #1 seed Tommy Haas in a third-set tie-breaker, and #6 seed Feliciano López to reach his first ATP semifinal. After he beat Haas, Johnson said that "Tommy is an unbelievable player and this is a win I won't forget." Haas later said, "I hate to lose, but I'm happy for him. He served well and competed hard." South African Kevin Anderson got revenge on Johnson in the semifinals as he beat him in straight sets to reach the final. Johnson received a wildcard into the maindraw of the 2014 BNP Paribas Open, but fell to the red-hot Spaniard Roberto Bautista Agut in straight sets, who knocked out #4 seed Tomáš Berdych in the next round. Johnson got a rematch with Bautista Agut just a couple weeks later in the 2014 Sony Open Tennis, this time falling in three sets.

In his first clay court tournament of the year, Johnson received a wild card into the U.S. Men's Clay Court Championships where he reached the second round and lost to eventual champion Fernando Verdasco. Johnson then competed in the Open de Nice Côte d'Azur where he fell in the first round to youngster Dominic Thiem. Johnson lost in three sets, while failing to convert a match point as he was trying to serve out the match at 6–5 in the second set. Johnson next competed in the 2014 French Open where he won his first ever ATP match on clay, and advanced to the second round. In his first round match against Frenchman Laurent Lokoli, Johnson came back from a two sets to love deficit, and saved two match points along the way for a dramatic five set victory. In his second round match, Johnson lost in straight sets to fellow American Jack Sock. Johnson registered his first grass court ATP win at the 2014 Gerry Weber Open when he defeated Frenchman Albano Olivetti. Johnson's second round opponent withdrew giving Johnson a walkover to the quarterfinals where he lost to the number four seed Kei Nishikori. The following week, Johnson competed in the 2014 Topshelf Open and reached the second round before falling to seventh seed Nicolas Mahut. Johnson then competed in the 2014 Wimbledon Championships. Unfortunately, Johnson fell in the first round in four sets to twenty-seventh seed Bautista Agut. Returning to the U.S., Johnson competed in the 2014 Hall of Fame Tennis Championships, where he lost in the quarterfinals to eventual champion Lleyton Hewitt. As the sixth seed in this tournament, this was Johnson's first ATP tournament where he was seeded. Johnson then kicked off his US Open Series in Atlanta, where he lost in the first round to his good friend and countryman Sam Querrey.

=== 2015: Best Year-End rankings ===
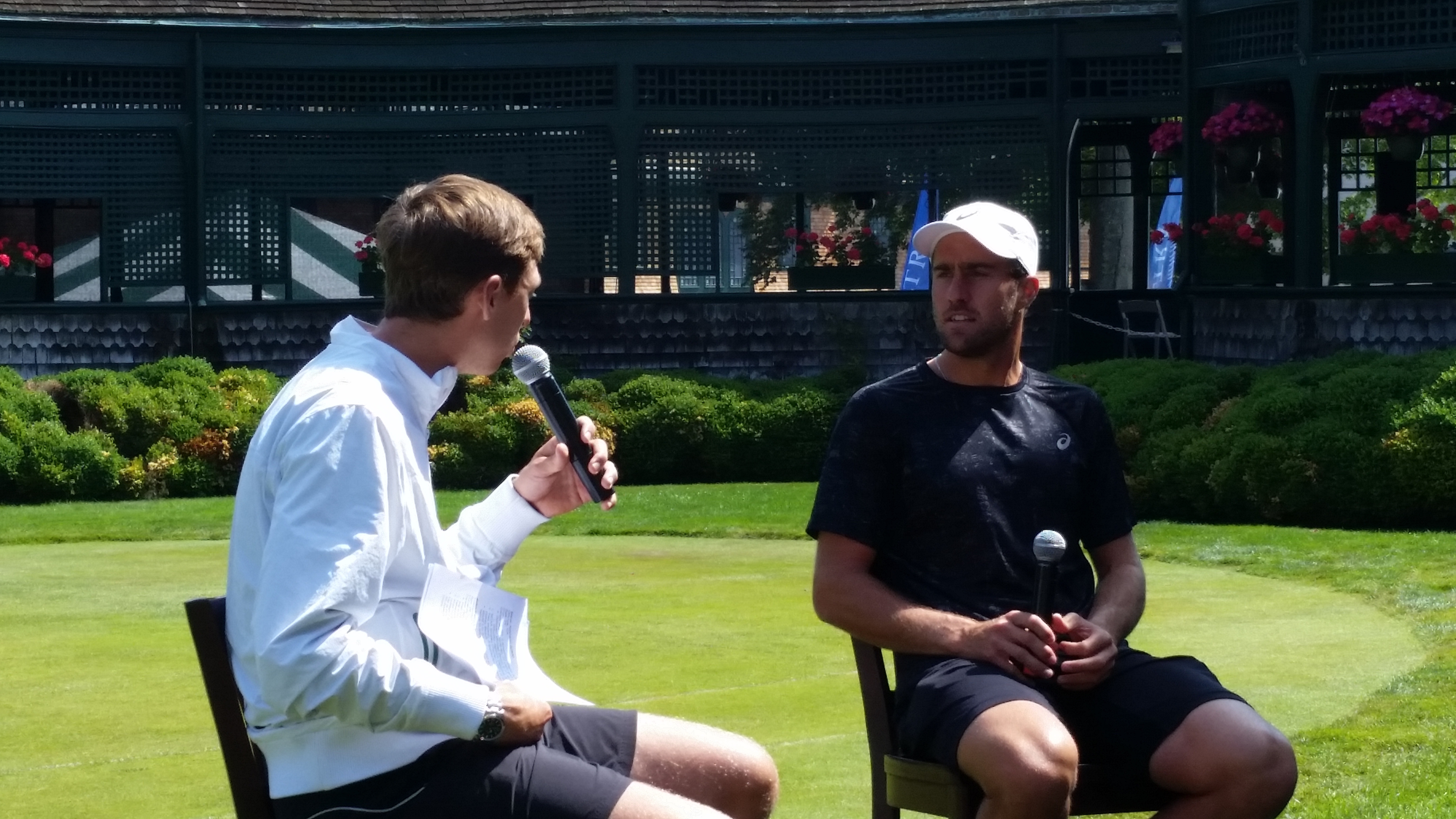
Steve Johnson interviewed at the 2015 Hall of Fame Tennis Championships

At the 2015 US Open, Johnson reached the semifinals in doubles for the first time at a Major partnering Sam Querrey after defeating en route the top seeded pair of the Bryan brothers in the first round. They were defeated in the semifinal by eight seeded pair of Jamie Murray and John Peers.

Johnson finished the year ranked World No. 32 in singles and World No. 52 in doubles, the highest year-end rankings in his career.

=== 2016: Olympic bronze medal, Wimbledon fourth round, career-high ranking ===
Johnson reached the third round of the 2016 Australian Open as the 31st seed but lost to David Ferrer in three sets. Johnson lost in the 1st round of the 2016 French Open as the 33rd seed. He won his first ATP Tour level title at the 2016 Aegon Open in Nottingham, UK, defeating Pablo Cuevas in the final.

Johnson reached the fourth round of 2016 Wimbledon Championships defeating Grigor Dimitrov before being defeated by Roger Federer in straight sets. He reached a singles career-high of World No. 21 on July 15, 2016.

In the 2016 Western & Southern Open he defeated Federico Delbonis in the 1st round, in the 2nd round he beat Julien Benneteau and in the 3rd round he beat 7th seed Jo-Wilfried Tsonga, all this set up a tie with Dimitrov in the quarterfinal, which he lost in straight sets. Johnson defeated Evgeny Donskoy in the first round of the US Open after losing the first 2 sets. His run was ended in the second round by Juan Martín del Potro in straight sets, however. Johnson would lose in the first round of the 2016 China Open to Dimitrov and in the 2016 Shanghai Masters to Andy Murray. After two more consecutive losses, he would end his season with a second-round loss in the 2016 Paris Masters to Richard Gasquet.

=== 2017: Second career title ===
Johnson began the 2017 season with a first-round loss to Dimitrov at the Brisbane International. He would dispatch John Isner to reach the semis of the Auckland Open, but lost to Jack Sock. He then lost to Stan Wawrinka in the Australian Open second round. After reaching three straight quarterfinals in his next three tournaments, Johnson lost to Roger Federer at Indian Wells and had a disappointing second-round loss at Miami to Nicolas Mahut. However, he would rebound by capturing his second career singles title (and first on clay) at the U.S. Men's Clay Court Championships in Houston, Texas, beating Sock in the semis and Thomaz Bellucci in a thrilling final, where Johnson overcame severe cramps and being down a break to win in a final-set tiebreak.

=== 2018: Third and fourth titles ===
Johnson made the semifinals in Delray Beach, where he lost to young German Peter Gojowczyk. In Miami, Johnson made it to the third round, where he was defeated by Spaniard Pablo Carreño Busta.

Johnson won his third title in Houston on clay courts after defeating five Americans: Ernesto Escobedo, Frances Tiafoe, John Isner, Taylor Fritz, and Tennys Sandgren. In July, Johnson won the grass-court Hall of Fame Championship in Newport, Rhode Island, defeating Indian Ramkumar Ramanathan over three sets in the final.

Johnson reached the final again in Winston-Salem in August, where he was defeated by Russian Daniil Medvedev in straight sets.

=== 2019: Wimbledon third round ===
Johnson reached the quarterfinals at Delray Beach in February, where he lost to Radu Albot.

In March, Johnson beat Taylor Fritz in the first round of Indian Wells, but fell to young Canadian Denis Shapovalov in the second.

At Wimbledon, Johnson beat Albert Ramos Viñolas in the first round and young Aussie Alex de Minaur in the second, only to be defeated by Kei Nishikori in the third round in straight sets. At the US Open, Johnson lost in the first round to Nick Kyrgios.

=== 2020: Masters 1000 semifinal in doubles ===
Johnson captured his seventh career Challenger title with a win over Stefano Travaglia at the Bendigo Challenger. After a first-round loss to Roger Federer in the first round of the Australian Open, he rebounded with his eighth Challenger title at the Indian Wells Challenger with a win over fellow American Jack Sock.

The season was then interrupted by the COVID-19 pandemic. When tennis returned in August Johnson, partnering Austin Krajicek as a wildcard pair, reached the semifinals at the Western & Southern Open, held in New York. In singles, he upset John Isner at the US Open before losing to Ričardas Berankis in the second round.

=== 2021: Major semifinal & first Masters final in doubles ===
At the French Open, Johnson reached the third round for the fourth time in his career defeating fellow American Frances Tiafoe in a five-setter and Thiago Monteiro in the second round, before losing to Pablo Carreño Busta.

Partnering with Austin Krajicek as wildcard pair, he reached his maiden Masters 1000 final at the Western & Southern Open in Cincinnati defeating No. 3 seeded Colombian pair Juan Sebastián Cabal and Robert Farah in a tight three-set match. As a result, he reentered the top 100 in doubles at World No. 95 on August 23, 2021. The pair last competed at the 2020 edition of the Cincinnati Masters where they reached the semifinals.

At the 2021 US Open he reached the semifinals in doubles partnering Sam Querrey also as a wildcard pair. They were defeated by the eventual champions Rajeev Ram and Joe Salisbury. As a result, he reached No. 62 in doubles on September 13, 2021.

=== 2022: Fourth Wimbledon & Indian Wells third rounds, Out of top 100 ===
At the 2022 Wimbledon Championships he reached the third round for a fourth time in his career defeating Grigor Dimitrov by retirement and wildcard Ryan Peniston before losing to another Brit ninth seed Cameron Norrie. Despite this result he dropped out of the top 100 on 8 August 2022 as points were not awarded at the All England Club.

=== 2023–2024: Retirement ===
At the 2023 Delray Beach Open he entered the main draw as a lucky loser but lost to fellow qualifier Nuno Borges for a second time in the tournament after losing to him in the last round of qualifying. He dropped out of the top 150 at No. 152 on 20 March 2023 as he failed to qualify and could not defend his 2022 third round showing in Indian Wells. Ranked No. 237 he qualified for the 2024 Dallas Open defeating top qualifying seed Térence Atmane. He announced his retirement after the 2024 BNP Paribas Open where he lost in the singles qualifying event and also participated in the doubles event with Tommy Paul, playing in his last professional career match on 10 March 2024.

== World Team Tennis ==
Steve Johnson was selected fifth overall in the Mylan World TeamTennis Roster Draft by the Orange County Breakers. Johnson was joined by his father, who was an assistant coach on the team. Despite ultimately placing third in the Western Conference, Johnson was the No. 2 men's singles player in the league, amassing a 62–47 record for the season. He was equally successful in men's doubles, pairing with doubles specialist Treat Huey to go 64–53. In the middle of the season, Johnson helped lead the Breakers to four consecutive victories. During the season, Johnson had victories over Andy Roddick in singles and doubles, as well as doubles victories over the Bryan brothers, and tennis legend John McEnroe. On July 20, Johnson landed himself in the No. 4 spot on the top plays of SportsCenter that evening against Alex Bogomolov Jr. of the Texas Wild with an amazing rally that ended with Johnson slipping and sliding for a volley winner. Steve made a successful debut with the Breakers in his first season, leading him to be named the Mylan WTT Male Rookie of the Year.

== Performance timelines ==
Key
W	F	SF	QF	#R	RR	Q#	DNQ	A	NH

(W) winner; (F) finalist; (SF) semifinalist; (QF) quarterfinalist; (#R) rounds 4, 3, 2, 1; (RR) round-robin stage; (Q#) qualification round; (DNQ) did not qualify; (A) absent; (NH) not held; (SR) strike rate (events won / competed); (W–L) win–loss record.
To avoid confusion and double counting, these charts are updated at the conclusion of a tournament or when the player's participation has ended.

=== Singles ===
Tournament	2010	2011	2012	2013	2014	2015	2016	2017	2018	2019	2020	2021	2022	2023	2024	SR	W–L
Grand Slam tournaments
Australian Open	A	A	A	1R	1R	3R	3R	2R	1R	1R	1R	A	2R	A	A	0 / 9	6–9
French Open	A	A	A	1R	2R	3R	1R	3R	3R	1R	1R	3R	2R	Q1	A	0 / 10	10–10
Wimbledon	A	A	A	1R	1R	2R	4R	3R	1R	3R	NH	2R	3R	Q1	A	0 / 9	11–9
US Open	Q1	1R	3R	1R	1R	1R	2R	2R	2R	1R	2R	2R	1R	1R	A	0 / 13	7–13
Win–loss	0–0	0–1	2–1	0–4	1–4	5–4	6–4	6–4	3–4	2–4	1–3	4–3	4–4	0–1	0–0	0 / 41	34–41
National representation
Summer Olympics	Not Held		A	Not Held			QF	Not Held				A	NH		A	0 / 1	3–1
Davis Cup	A	A	A	A	A	PO	A	QF	SF	A	A	A	A	A	A	0 / 2	1–3
ATP World Tour Masters 1000
Indian Wells Masters	A	Q1	A	1R	1R	3R	3R	3R	1R	2R	NH	1R	3R	Q1	Q1	0 / 9	7–9
Miami Open	A	A	A	Q2	1R	1R	3R	2R	3R	2R	NH	1R	Q2	Q1	A	0 / 7	3–7
Monte-Carlo Masters	A	A	A	A	A	1R	A	A	A	A	NH	A	A	A	A	0 / 1	0–1
Madrid Open	A	A	A	A	A	2R	1R	A	A	1R	NH	A	A	A	A	0 / 2	1–3
Italian Open	A	A	A	A	A	1R	1R	A	2R	1R	A	A	A	A	A	0 / 3	1–4
Canadian Open	A	A	A	A	A	1R	1R	1R	1R	A	NH	A	A	A	A	0 / 4	0–4
Cincinnati Masters	A	Q2	A	Q2	3R	Q2	QF	1R	1R	A	Q1	Q2	Q2	A	A	0 / 4	5–4
Shanghai Masters	A	A	A	A	2R	2R	2R	3R	1R	A	NH			A	A	0 / 5	5–5
Paris Masters	A	A	A	A	Q1	A	2R	1R	1R	A	A	A	A	A	A	0 / 3	1–3
Win–loss	0–0	0–0	0–0	0–1	3–4	4–7	7–8	3–6	3–6	1–2	0–0	0–2	2–1	0–0	0–0	0 / 38	23–38
Career statistics
Tournaments	1	2	5	10	20	27	29	24	24	21	8	12	17	5	1	206	
Titles	0	0	0	0	0	0	1	1	2	0	0	0	0	0	0	4	
Finals	0	0	0	0	0	1	1	1	3	0	0	0	0	0	0	6	
Overall win–loss	0–1	0–2	3–5	4–10	19–20	36–28	30–28	30–22	27–24	14–21	6–8	10–12	16–17	2–5	0–1	197–204	
Year-end ranking	636	372	175	156	37	32	33	44	33	85	72	85	110	241	-	49%	

=== Doubles ===
Tournament	2011	2012	2013	2014	2015	2016	2017	2018	2019	2020	2021	2022	2023	2024	SR	W–L
Grand Slam tournaments
Australian Open	A	A	A	A	1R	2R	A	2R	2R	3R	A	A	A	A	0 / 5	5–5
French Open	A	A	A	1R	2R	A	1R	3R	1R	1R	1R	A	A	A	0 / 7	3–7
Wimbledon	A	A	1R	A	2R	1R	A	A	A	NH	A	1R	A	A	0 / 4	1–4
US Open	1R	2R	1R	1R	SF	1R	1R	A	1R	A	SF	1R	1R	A	0 / 11	9–11
Win–loss	0–1	1–1	0–2	0–2	6–4	1–3	0–2	3–2	1–3	2–2	4–2	0–2	0–1	0–0	0 / 27	18–27
ATP World Tour Masters 1000
Indian Wells Masters	A	A	A	A	A	1R	2R	1R	1R	NH	2R	A	A	1R	0 / 6	2–6
Miami Open	A	A	A	A	A	1R	2R	SF	1R	NH	1R	A	A	A	0 / 5	4–5
Madrid Open	A	A	A	A	1R	1R	A	A	A	NH	A	A	A	A	0 / 2	0–2
Italian Open	A	A	A	A	A	2R	A	2R	A	A	A	A	A	A	0 / 2	2–2
Cincinnati Masters	QF	A	QF	SF	2R	1R	1R	1R	A	SF	F	2R	A	A	0 / 10	16–9
Shanghai Masters	A	A	A	A	A	1R	A	A	A	NH			A	A	0 / 1	0–1
Win–loss	2–1	0–0	2–1	3–1	1–2	1–5	2–3	4–4	0–2	3–1	6–3	1–1	0–0	0–1	0 / 26	25–25
National representation
Summer Olympics	NH	A	Not Held			SF-B	Not Held				A	NH		A	0 / 1	4–1
Davis Cup	A	A	A	A	PO	A	QF	SF	A	A	A	A	A	A	0 / 2	4–0
Career statistics
Titles / Finals	0 / 0	0 / 0	0 / 0	0 / 1	0 / 0	1 / 2	0 / 1	0 / 0	0 / 0	0 / 1	0 / 2	1 / 1	0 / 0	0 / 0	2 / 8	
Year-end ranking	191	167	121	101	52	85	167	89	455	137	55	154	-	-		

== Significant finals ==
=== Masters 1000 finals ===
==== Doubles: 1 (1 runner-up) ====
Outcome	Year	Championship	Surface	Partner	Opponents	Score
Loss	2021	Cincinnati Masters	Hard	(United States) Austin Krajicek	(Spain) Marcel Granollers (Argentina) Horacio Zeballos	6–7^{(5–7)}, 6–7^{(5–7)}

=== Olympic medal matches ===
==== Doubles: 1 (Bronze) ====
Result	Year	Tournament	Surface	Partner	Opponents	Score
Bronze	2016	2016 Summer Olympics, Brazil	Hard	(United States) Jack Sock	(Canada) Daniel Nestor (Canada) Vasek Pospisil	6–2, 6–4

== ATP career finals ==
=== Singles: 6 (4 titles, 2 runner-ups) ===
Legend Grand Slam tournaments (0–0) ATP World Tour Finals (0–0) ATP World Tour Masters 1000 (0–0) ATP World Tour 500 Series (0–1) ATP World Tour 250 Series (4–1)	Finals by surface Hard (0–2) Clay (2–0) Grass (2–0)	Finals by setting Outdoor (4–1) Indoor (0–1)

Result	W–L	Date	Tournament	Tier	Surface	Opponent	Score
Loss	0–1	Oct 2015	Vienna Open, Austria	500 Series	Hard (i)	(Spain) David Ferrer	6–4, 4–6, 5–7
Win	1–1	Jun 2016	Nottingham Open, UK	250 Series	Grass	(Uruguay) Pablo Cuevas	7–6^{(7–5)}, 7–5
Win	2–1	Apr 2017	U.S. Men's Clay Court Championships, US	250 Series	Clay	(Brazil) Thomaz Bellucci	6–4, 4–6, 7–6^{(7–5)}
Win	3–1	Apr 2018	U.S. Men's Clay Court Championships, US (2)	250 Series	Clay	(United States) Tennys Sandgren	7–6^{(7–2)}, 2–6, 6–4
Win	4–1	Jul 2018	Hall of Fame Tennis Championships, US	250 Series	Grass	(India) Ramkumar Ramanathan	7–5, 3–6, 6–2
Loss	4–2	Aug 2018	Winston-Salem Open, US	250 Series	Hard	(Russia) Daniil Medvedev	4–6, 4–6

=== Doubles: 8 (2 titles, 6 runner-ups) ===
Legend Grand Slam tournaments (0–0) ATP World Tour Finals (0–0) ATP World Tour Masters 1000 (0–1) ATP World Tour 500 Series (0–0) ATP World Tour 250 Series (2–5)	Finals by surface Hard (0–6) Clay (1–0) Grass (1–0)	Finals by setting Outdoor (2–3) Indoor (0–3)

Result	W–L	Date	Tournament	Tier	Surface	Partner	Opponents	Score
Loss	0–1	Jul 2014	Atlanta Open, US	250 Series	Hard	(United States) Sam Querrey	(Canada) Vasek Pospisil (United States) Jack Sock	3–6, 7–5, [5–10]
Loss	0–2	Feb 2016	Memphis Open, US	250 Series	Hard (i)	(United States) Sam Querrey	(Poland) Mariusz Fyrstenberg (Mexico) Santiago González	4–6, 4–6
Win	1–2	May 2016	Geneva Open, Switzerland	250 Series	Clay	(United States) Sam Querrey	(South Africa) Raven Klaasen (United States) Rajeev Ram	6–4, 6–1
Loss	1–3	Feb 2017	Memphis Open, US	250 Series	Hard (i)	(United States) Ryan Harrison	(United States) Brian Baker (Croatia) Nikola Mektić	3–6, 4–6
Loss	1–4	Feb 2020	New York Open, US	250 Series	Hard (i)	(United States) Reilly Opelka	(United Kingdom) Dominic Inglot (Pakistan) Aisam-ul-Haq Qureshi	6–7^{(5–7)}, 6–7^{(6–8)}
Loss	1–5	Jul 2021	Atlanta Open, US	250 Series	Hard	(Australia) Jordan Thompson	(United States) Reilly Opelka (Italy) Jannik Sinner	4–6, 7–6^{(8–6)}, [3–10]
Loss	1–6	Aug 2021	Cincinnati Masters, US	Masters 1000	Hard	(United States) Austin Krajicek	(Spain) Marcel Granollers (Argentina) Horacio Zeballos	6–7^{(5–7)}, 6–7^{(5–7)}
Win	2–6	Jul 2022	Hall of Fame Open, US	250 Series	Grass	(United States) William Blumberg	(South Africa) Raven Klaasen (Brazil) Marcelo Melo	6–4, 7–5

== Challenger and ITF finals ==
=== Singles: 16 (11–5) ===
Legend (singles) ATP Challenger Tour (9–4) ITF Futures Tour (2–1)	Finals by surface Hard (10–4) Clay (0–2) Grass (1–0) Carpet (0–0)

Result	W–L	Date	Tournament	Tier	Surface	Opponent	Score
Loss	0–1	Jun 2011	USA F13, Sacramento	Futures	Hard	(United States) Daniel Kosakowski	4–6, 6–2, 3–6
Win	1–1	Sep 2011	USA F23, Claremont	Futures	Hard	(Barbados) Darian King	6–2, 6–3
Win	2–1	Sep 2011	USA F24, Costa Mesa	Futures	Hard	(New Zealand) Artem Sitak	6–3, 6–3
Win	3–1	Aug 2012	Aptos, USA	Challenger	Hard	(Colombia) Robert Farah	6–3, 6–3
Win	4–1	Jun 2013	Nottingham, UK	Challenger	Grass	(Belgium) Ruben Bemelmans	7–5, 7–5
Win	5–1	Feb 2014	Dallas, USA	Challenger	Hard (i)	(Tunisia) Malek Jaziri	6–4, 6–4
Loss	5–2	Mar 2014	Irving, USA	Challenger	Hard	(Czech Republic) Lukáš Rosol	0–6, 3–6
Win	6–2	Apr 2014	Le Gosier, Guadeloupe	Challenger	Hard	(France) Kenny de Schepper	6–1, 6–7^{(5–7)}, 7–6^{(7–2)}
Loss	6–3	May 2014	Bordeaux, France	Challenger	Clay	(France) Julien Benneteau	3–6, 2–6
Win	7–3	Aug 2019	Aptos, USA	Challenger	Hard	(Germany) Dominik Köpfer	6–4, 7–6^{(7–4)}
Loss	7–4	Oct 2019	Fairfield, USA	Challenger	Hard	(Australia) Christopher O'Connell	4–6, 4–6
Win	8–4	Jan 2020	Bendigo, Australia	Challenger	Hard	(Italy) Stefano Travaglia	7–6^{(7–2)}, 7–6^{(7–3)}
Win	9–4	Mar 2020	Indian Wells, USA	Challenger	Hard	(United States) Jack Sock	6–4, 6–4
Loss	9–5	Apr 2022	Sarasota, USA	Challenger	Clay	(Colombia) Daniel Elahi Galán	6–7^{(7–9)}, 6–4, 1–6
Win	10–5	Jul 2023	Bloomfield Hills, USA	Challenger	Hard	(Kazakhstan) Mikhail Kukushkin	6–4, 6–7^{(7–9)}, 7–6^{(7–4)}
Win	11–5	Jul 2023	Lexington, USA	Challenger	Hard	(France) Arthur Cazaux	7–6^{(7–5)}, 6–4

=== Doubles: 5 (2–3) ===
Result	W–L	Date	Tournament	Surface	Partner	Opponents	Score
Loss	0–1	Oct 2011	Tiburon, USA	Hard	(United States) Sam Querrey	(Australia) Carsten Ball (Australia) Chris Guccione	1–6, 7–5, [6–10]
Win	1–1	Nov 2011	Knoxville, USA	Hard (i)	(United States) Austin Krajicek	(Australia) Adam Hubble (Denmark) Frederik Nielsen	3–6, 6–4, [13–11]
Loss	1–2	Apr 2013	Sarasota, USA	Clay	(United States) Bradley Klahn	(Serbia) Ilija Bozoljac (India) Somdev Devvarman	7–6^{(7–5)}, 6–7^{(3–7)}, [9–11]
Loss	1–3	Sep 2013	Napa, USA	Hard	(United States) Tim Smyczek	(United States) Bobby Reynolds (Australia) John-Patrick Smith	4–6, 6–7^{(2–7)}
Win	2–3	Nov 2013	Charlottesville, USA	Hard (i)	(United States) Tim Smyczek	(United States) Jarmere Jenkins (United States) Donald Young	6–4, 6–3

== Wins over top-10 players ==
- Johnson had a 4–30 record against players who were, at the time the match was played, ranked in the top 10.

#	Player	Rank	Event	Surface	Rd	Score	SJR
2016
1.	(France) Richard Gasquet	10	Queen's Club Championships, United Kingdom	Grass	1R	7–6^{(7–2)}, 6–2	39
2.	(France) Jo-Wilfried Tsonga	10	Cincinnati Masters, United States	Hard	3R	6–3, 7–6^{(8–6)}	23
2017
3.	(Austria) Dominic Thiem	7	Japan Open, Japan	Hard	1R	4–6, 7–6^{(7–5)}, 6–4	46
2018
4.	(United States) John Isner	9	U.S. Men's Clay Court Championships, United States	Clay	QF	7–6^{(7–4)}, 4–6, 7–6^{(7–5)}	51

== World TeamTennis ==
Johnson played five seasons with World TeamTennis starting in 2013 when he made his debut with the Orange County Breakers, earning the Male Rookie of the Year award. He played two more seasons with the Breakers in 2016 and 2017, before playing for the New York Empire in 2018, and returning to the Breakers in 2019. He joined the Orange County during the 2020 WTT season.
