= Hall of Fame Open =

Coordinates: 41.483°N 71.307°W

Tournament information
- Event name: Cerity Partners Hall of Fame Open
- Founded: 1976
- Location: Newport, Rhode Island; United States
- Venue: International Tennis Hall of Fame
- Surface: Grass / outdoors
- Website: halloffameopen.com

Current champions (2026)
- Men's singles: (United Kingdom) Jacob Fearnley
- Women's singles: (Germany) Tatjana Maria
- Men's doubles: (New Zealand) Finn Reynolds (New Zealand) James Watt
- Women's doubles: Iryna Shymanovich (United States) Katie Volynets
ATP Tour
- Category: ATP World Series (1990–1997); ATP International Series (1998–2008); ATP Tour 250 (2009–2024); ATP Challenger Tour 125 (since 2025)
- Draw: 32S / 24Q / 16D
- Prize money: $225,000
WTA Tour
- Category: WTA Tour 125 (since 2025)
- Draw: 32S / 8Q / 15D
- Prize money: $225,000

The Hall of Fame Open, sponsored by Cerity Partners, is an international tennis tournament that has been held every year in July since 1976 at the International Tennis Hall of Fame in Newport, Rhode Island, the original location of the U.S. National Championships. It is held on outdoor grass courts, and is since 1988 the only grass court tournament played outside Europe.

The event, which was part of the Grand Prix tennis circuit from 1976 to 1989, typically featured a 32-player singles draw and a 16-team doubles tournament. Up until 2011, when John Isner won the tournament, the top seed had never triumphed at Newport, a trait that has led to the moniker "the Casino Curse", due to the location of the Hall of Fame at the Newport Casino.

The ATP 250 event was known as the Infosys Hall of Fame Open from 2023 until 2025. In 2025, it was downgraded to a Challenger 125 event, but also expanded to become a combined tournament with the inclusion of a women's WTA 125 series event. The tournament was moved up one week, coinciding with the second week of Wimbledon, to attract players who lost in the first week of Wimbledon. The International Tennis Hall of Fame induction ceremony, formerly held during the tournament, was shifted to August.

== Past finals ==
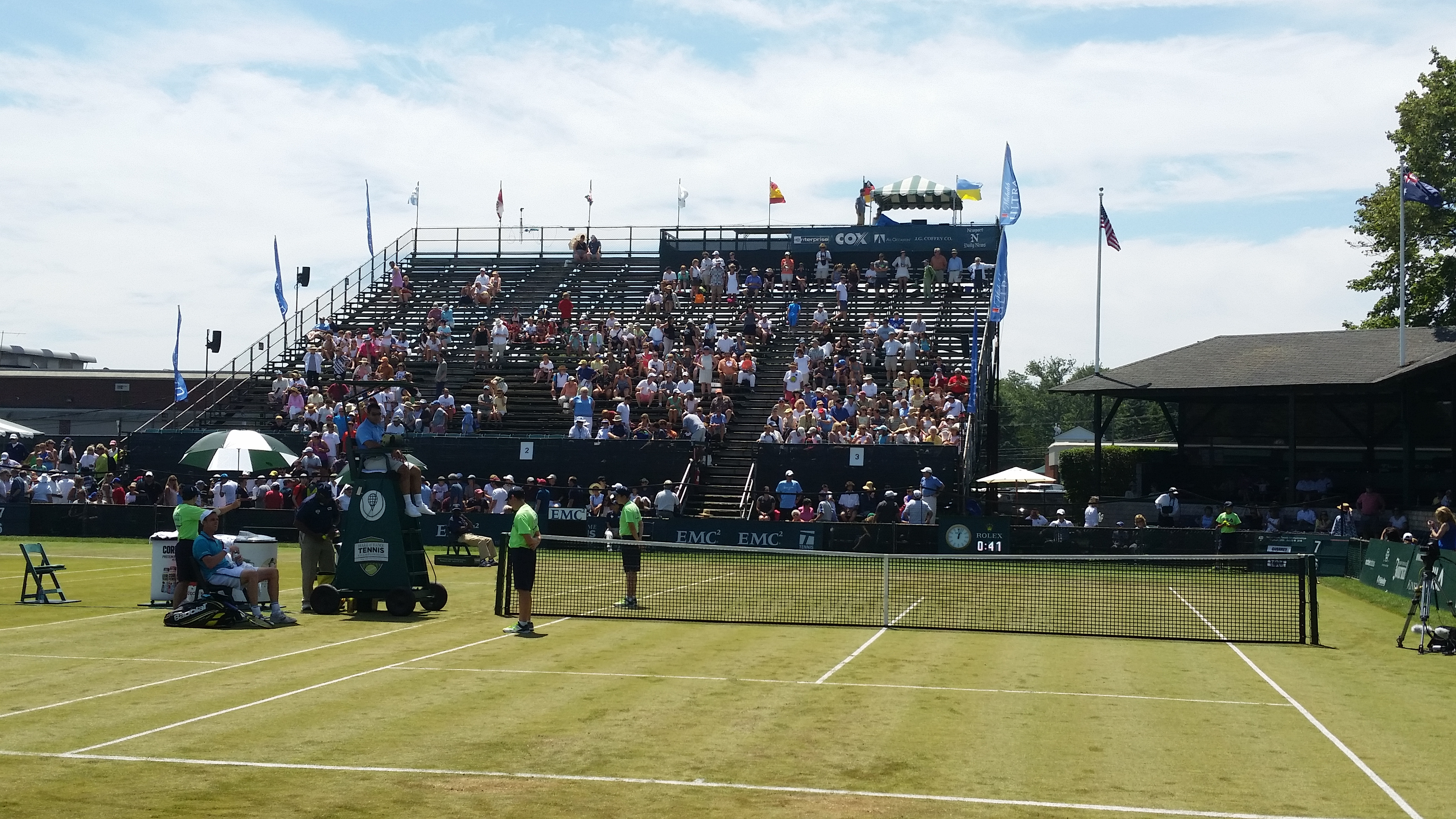
Center court in 2015

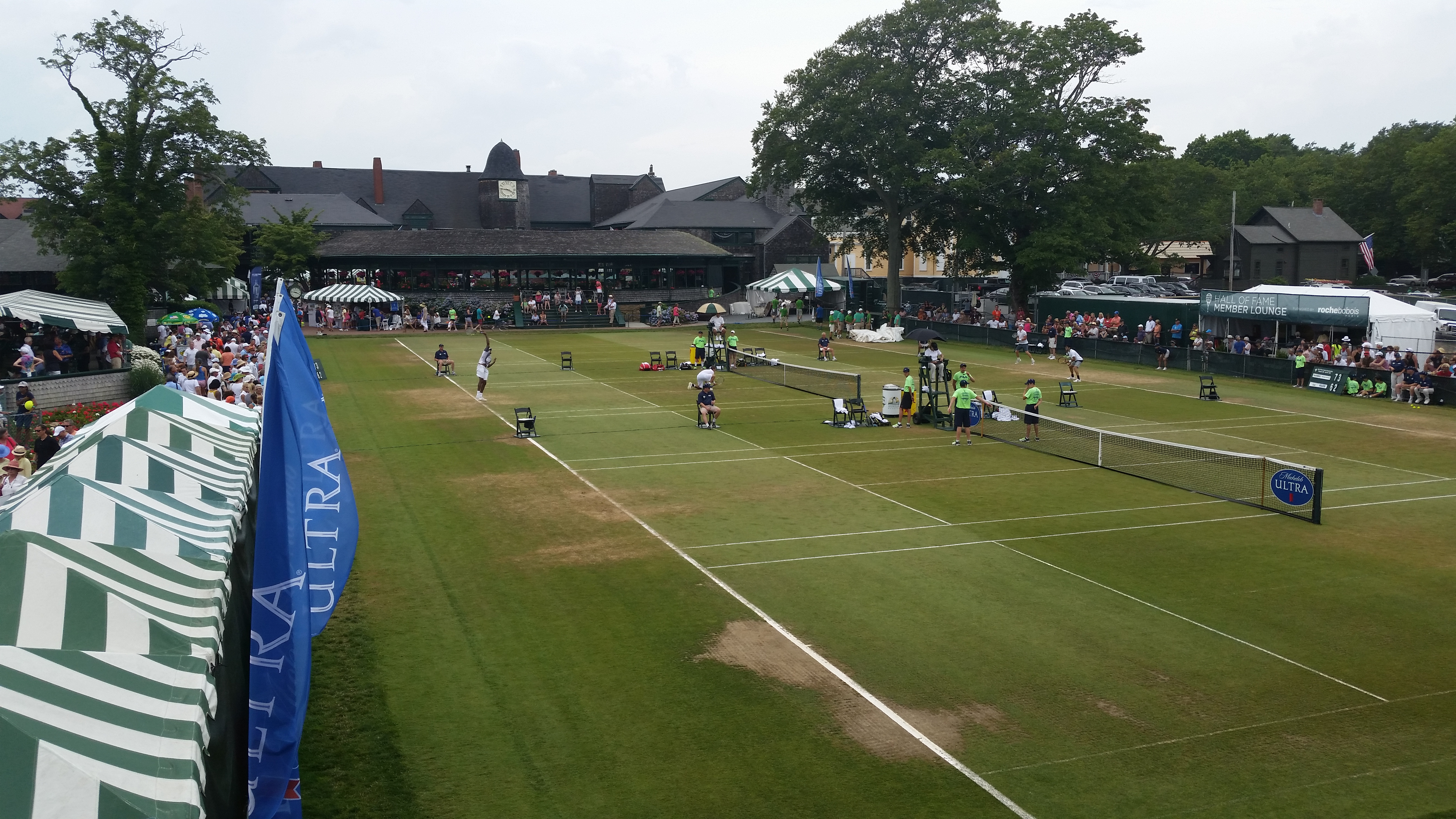
Side courts in 2015

=== Men's singles ===
Year	Champions	Runners-up	Score
1976	(India) Vijay Amritraj	(United States) Brian Teacher	6–3, 4–6, 6–3, 6–1
1977	(United States) Tim Gullikson	(United States) Hank Pfister	6–4, 6–4, 5–7, 6–2
1978	(South Africa) Bernard Mitton	(Australia) John James	6–1, 3–6, 7–6
1979	(United States) Brian Teacher	(United States) Stan Smith	1–6, 6–3, 6–4
1980	(India) Vijay Amritraj (2)	(Zimbabwe) Andrew Pattison	6–1, 5–7, 6–3
1981	(South Africa) Johan Kriek	(United States) Hank Pfister	3–6, 6–3, 7–5
1982	(United States) Hank Pfister	(United States) Mike Estep	6–1, 7–5
1983	(Australia) John Fitzgerald	(United States) Scott Davis	2–6, 6–1, 6–3
1984	(India) Vijay Amritraj (3)	(United States) Tim Mayotte	3–6, 6–4, 6–4
1985	(United States) Tom Gullikson	(United States) John Sadri	6–3, 7–5
1986	(United States) Bill Scanlon	(United States) Tim Wilkison	7–5, 6–4
1987	(United States) Dan Goldie	(United States) Sammy Giammalva Jr.	6–7, 6–4, 6–4
1988	(Australia) Wally Masur	(Australia) Brad Drewett	6–2, 6–1
1989	(United States) Jim Pugh	(Sweden) Peter Lundgren	6–4, 4–6, 6–2
1990	(South Africa) Pieter Aldrich	(Australia) Darren Cahill	7–6, 1–6, 6–1
1991	(United States) Bryan Shelton	(Argentina) Javier Frana	3–6, 6–4, 6–4
1992	(United States) Bryan Shelton (2)	(Austria) Alex Antonitsch	6–4, 6–4
1993	(Canada) Greg Rusedski	(Argentina) Javier Frana	7–5, 6–7^{(7–9)}, 7–6^{(7–5)}
1994	(United States) David Wheaton	(Australia) Todd Woodbridge	6–4, 3–6, 7–6^{(7–5)}
1995	(Germany) David Prinosil	(United States) David Wheaton	7–6^{(7–3)}, 5–7, 6–2
1996	(Venezuela) Nicolás Pereira	(South Africa) Grant Stafford	4–6, 6–4, 6–4
1997	(Armenia) Sargis Sargsian	(New Zealand) Brett Steven	7–6^{(7–0)}, 4–6, 7–5
1998	(India) Leander Paes	(South Africa) Neville Godwin	6–3, 6–2
1999	(United States) Chris Woodruff	(Denmark) Kenneth Carlsen	6–7^{(5–7)}, 6–4, 6–4
2000	(Netherlands) Peter Wessels	(Germany) Jens Knippschild	7–6^{(7–3)}, 6–3
2001	(South Africa) Neville Godwin	(United Kingdom) Martin Lee	6–1, 6–4
2002	(United States) Taylor Dent	(United States) James Blake	6–1, 4–6, 6–4
2003	(United States) Robby Ginepri	(Austria) Jürgen Melzer	6–4, 6–7^{(3–7)}, 6–1
2004	(United Kingdom) Greg Rusedski (2)	(Germany) Alexander Popp	7–6^{(7–5)}, 7–6^{(7–2)}
2005	(United Kingdom) Greg Rusedski (3)	(United States) Vince Spadea	7–6^{(7–3)}, 2–6, 6–4
2006	(Australia) Mark Philippoussis	(United States) Justin Gimelstob	6–3, 7–5
2007	(France) Fabrice Santoro	(France) Nicolas Mahut	6–4, 6–4
2008	(France) Fabrice Santoro (2)	(India) Prakash Amritraj	6–3, 7–5
2009	(United States) Rajeev Ram	(United States) Sam Querrey	6–7^{(3–7)}, 7–5, 6–3
2010	(United States) Mardy Fish	(Belgium) Olivier Rochus	5–7, 6–3, 6–4
2011	(United States) John Isner	(Belgium) Olivier Rochus	6–3, 7–6^{(8–6)}
2012	(United States) John Isner (2)	(Australia) Lleyton Hewitt	7–6^{(7–1)}, 6–4
2013	(France) Nicolas Mahut	(Australia) Lleyton Hewitt	5–7, 7–5, 6–3
2014	(Australia) Lleyton Hewitt	(Croatia) Ivo Karlović	6–3, 6–7^{(4–7)}, 7–6^{(7–3)}
2015	(United States) Rajeev Ram (2)	(Croatia) Ivo Karlović	7–6^{(7–5)}, 5–7, 7–6^{(7–2)}
2016	(Croatia) Ivo Karlović	(Luxembourg) Gilles Müller	6–7^{(2–7)}, 7–6^{(7–5)}, 7–6^{(14–12)}
2017	(United States) John Isner (3)	(Australia) Matthew Ebden	6–3, 7–6^{(7–4)}
2018	(United States) Steve Johnson	(India) Ramkumar Ramanathan	7–5, 3–6, 6–2
2019	(United States) John Isner (4)	(Kazakhstan) Alexander Bublik	7–6^{(7–2)}, 6–3
2020	Not held due to COVID-19 pandemic		
2021	(South Africa) Kevin Anderson	(United States) Jenson Brooksby	7–6^{(10–8)}, 6–4
2022	(United States) Maxime Cressy	(Kazakhstan) Alexander Bublik	2–6, 6–3, 7–6^{(7–3)}
2023	(France) Adrian Mannarino	(United States) Alex Michelsen	6–2, 6–4
2024	(United States) Marcos Giron	(United States) Alex Michelsen	6–7^{(4–7)}, 6–3, 7–5
↓ ATP Challenger 125 ↓
2025	(United States) Zachary Svajda	(France) Adrian Mannarino	7–5, 6–3
2026	(United Kingdom) Jacob Fearnley	(Australia) Adam Walton	5–7, 7–6^{(10–8)}, 6–4

=== Women's singles ===
Year	Champions	Runners-up	Score
2025	(United States) Caty McNally	(Germany) Tatjana Maria	2–6, 6–4, 6–2
2026	(Germany) Tatjana Maria	(United States) Katie Volynets	6–2, 6–4

=== Men's doubles ===
Year	Champions	Runners-up	Score
1977	(Egypt) Ismail El Shafei (New Zealand) Brian Fairlie	(United States) Tim Gullikson (United States) Tom Gullikson	6–7, 6–3, 7–6
1978	(United States) Tim Gullikson (United States) Tom Gullikson	(Australia) Colin Dibley (Australia) Bob Giltinan	6–4, 6–4
1979	(United States) Bob Lutz (United States) Stan Smith	(Australia) John James (Australia) Chris Kachel	6–4, 7–6
1980	(Rhodesia) Andrew Pattison (United States) Butch Walts	(United States) Fritz Buehning (United States) Peter Rennert	7–6, 6–4
1981	(Australia) Brad Drewett (United States) Erik van Dillen	(South Africa) Kevin Curren (United States) Billy Martin	6–2, 6–4
1982	(United States) Andy Andrews (United States) John Sadri	(Australia) Syd Ball (Australia) Rod Frawley	3–6, 7–6, 7–5
1983	(India) Vijay Amritraj (Australia) John Fitzgerald	(United States) Tim Gullikson (United States) Tom Gullikson	6–3, 6–4
1984	(Australia) David Graham (Australia) Laurie Warder	(United States) Ken Flach (United States) Robert Seguso	6–4, 7–6
1985	(Australia) Peter Doohan (United States) Sammy Giammalva Jr.	(United States) Paul Annacone (South Africa) Christo van Rensburg	6–1, 6–3
1986	(India) Vijay Amritraj (United States) Tim Wilkison	(South Africa) Eddie Edwards (Paraguay) Francisco González	4–6, 7–5, 7–6
1987	(United States) Dan Goldie (United States) Larry Scott	(United States) Chip Hooper (United States) Mike Leach	1–6, 6–3, 7–5
1988	(United States) Kelly Jones (Sweden) Peter Lundgren	(United States) Scott Davis (United States) Dan Goldie	6–3, 7–6
1989	(United States) Patrick Galbraith (United States) Brian Garrow	(South Africa) Neil Broad (South Africa) Stefan Kruger	2–6, 7–5, 6–3
1990	(Australia) Darren Cahill (Australia) Mark Kratzmann	(United States) Todd Nelson (United States) Bryan Shelton	7–6, 6–2
1991	(Italy) Gianluca Pozzi (New Zealand) Brett Steven	(Argentina) Javier Frana (United States) Bruce Steel	6–4, 6–4
1992	(South Africa) Royce Deppe (Czechoslovakia) David Rikl	(United States) Paul Annacone (United States) David Wheaton	6–4, 6–4
1993	(Argentina) Javier Frana (South Africa) Christo van Rensburg	(Zimbabwe) Byron Black (United States) Jim Pugh	4–6, 6–1, 7–6
1994	(Austria) Alex Antonitsch (Canada) Greg Rusedski	(United States) Kent Kinnear (United States) David Wheaton	6–4, 3–6, 6–4
1995	(Germany) Jörn Renzenbrink (Germany) Markus Zoecke	(Australia) Paul Kilderry (Portugal) Nuno Marques	6–1, 6–2
1996	(South Africa) Marius Barnard (South Africa) Piet Norval	(Australia) Paul Kilderry (Australia) Michael Tebbutt	6–7, 6–4, 6–4
1997	(United States) Justin Gimelstob (New Zealand) Brett Steven	(United States) Kent Kinnear (North Macedonia) Aleksandar Kitinov	6–3, 6–4
1998	(United States) Doug Flach (Australia) Sandon Stolle	(Australia) Scott Draper (Australia) Jason Stoltenberg	6–2, 4–6, 7–6
1999	(Australia) Wayne Arthurs (India) Leander Paes	(Armenia) Sargis Sargsian (United States) Chris Woodruff	6–7, 7–6, 6–3
2000	(Israel) Jonathan Erlich (Israel) Harel Levy	(United Kingdom) Kyle Spencer (United States) Mitch Sprengelmeyer	7–6^{(7–2)}, 7–5
2001	(United States) Bob Bryan (United States) Mike Bryan	(Brazil) André Sá (United States) Glenn Weiner	6–3, 7–5
2002	(United States) Bob Bryan (United States) Mike Bryan	(Austria) Jürgen Melzer (Germany) Alexander Popp	7–5, 6–3
2003	(Australia) Jordan Kerr (Australia) David Macpherson	(Austria) Julian Knowle (Austria) Jürgen Melzer	7–6^{(7–4)}, 6–3
2004	(Australia) Jordan Kerr (United States) Jim Thomas	(France) Gregory Carraz (France) Nicolas Mahut	6–3, 6–7^{(5–7)}, 6–3
2005	(Australia) Jordan Kerr (United States) Jim Thomas	(United States) Graydon Oliver (United States) Travis Parrott	7–6^{(7–5)}, 7–6^{(7–5)}
2006	(United States) Robert Kendrick (Austria) Jürgen Melzer	(South Africa) Jeff Coetzee (United States) Justin Gimelstob	7–6^{(7–3)}, 6–0
2007	(Australia) Jordan Kerr (United States) Jim Thomas	(Australia) Nathan Healey (Russia) Igor Kunitsyn	6–3, 7–5
2008	(United States) Mardy Fish (United States) John Isner	(India) Rohan Bopanna (Pakistan) Aisam-ul-Haq Qureshi	6–4, 7–6^{(7–1)}
2009	(Australia) Jordan Kerr (United States) Rajeev Ram	(Germany) Michael Kohlmann (Netherlands) Rogier Wassen	6–7^{(6–8)}, 7–6^{(7–9)}, [10–6]
2010	(Australia) Carsten Ball (Australia) Chris Guccione	(Mexico) Santiago González (United States) Travis Rettenmaier	6–3, 6–4
2011	(Australia) Matthew Ebden (United States) Ryan Harrison	(Sweden) Johan Brunström (Canada) Adil Shamasdin	4–6, 6–3, [10–5]
2012	(Mexico) Santiago González (United States) Scott Lipsky	(United Kingdom) Colin Fleming (United Kingdom) Ross Hutchins	7–6^{(7–3)}, 6–3
2013	(France) Nicolas Mahut (France) Édouard Roger-Vasselin	(United States) Tim Smyczek (United States) Rhyne Williams	6–7^{(4–7)}, 6–2, [10–5]
2014	(Australia) Chris Guccione (Australia) Lleyton Hewitt	(Israel) Jonathan Erlich (United States) Rajeev Ram	7–5, 6–4
2015	(United Kingdom) Jonathan Marray (Pakistan) Aisam-ul-Haq Qureshi	(United States) Nicholas Monroe (Croatia) Mate Pavić	4–6, 6–3, [10–8]
2016	(Australia) Sam Groth (Australia) Chris Guccione	(United Kingdom) Jonathan Marray (Canada) Adil Shamasdin	6–4, 6–3
2017	(Pakistan) Aisam-ul-Haq Qureshi (United States) Rajeev Ram	(Australia) Matt Reid (Australia) John-Patrick Smith	6–4, 4–6, [10–7]
2018	(Israel) Jonathan Erlich (New Zealand) Artem Sitak	(El Salvador) Marcelo Arévalo (Mexico) Miguel Ángel Reyes-Varela	6–1, 6–2
2019	(Spain) Marcel Granollers (Ukraine) Sergiy Stakhovsky	(El Salvador) Marcelo Arévalo (Mexico) Miguel Ángel Reyes-Varela	6–7^{(10–12)}, 6–4, [13–11]
2020	Not held due to COVID-19		
2021	(United States) William Blumberg (United States) Jack Sock	(United States) Austin Krajicek (Canada) Vasek Pospisil	6–2, 7–6^{(7–3)}
2022	(United States) William Blumberg (United States) Steve Johnson	(South Africa) Raven Klaasen (Brazil) Marcelo Melo	6–4, 7–5
2023	(United States) Nathaniel Lammons (United States) Jackson Withrow	(United States) William Blumberg (Australia) Max Purcell	6–3, 5–7, [10–5]
2024	(Sweden) André Göransson (Netherlands) Sem Verbeek	(United States) Robert Cash (United States) JJ Tracy	6–3, 6–4
↓ ATP Challenger 125 ↓
2025	(United States) Robert Cash (United States) JJ Tracy	(Mexico) Hans Hach Verdugo (Colombia) Cristian Rodríguez	7–6^{(7–3)}, 6–3
2026	(New Zealand) Finn Reynolds (New Zealand) James Watt	(Brazil) Fernando Romboli (Australia) John-Patrick Smith	6–1, 6–7^{(2–7)}, [10–6]

=== Women's doubles ===
Year	Champions	Runners-up	Score
2025	(United States) Carmen Corley (United States) Ivana Corley	(Netherlands) Arianne Hartono (India) Prarthana Thombare	7–6^{(7–4)}, 6–3
2026	Iryna Shymanovich (United States) Katie Volynets	(United States) Savannah Broadus (United States) Kylie Collins	6–2, 7–6^{(8–6)}

== See also ==
- Newport Casino Invitational – invitational tournament held between 1915 and 1967.
- Virginia Slims of Newport – women's tournament
