= 2015 Hall of Fame Tennis Championships =

- Date: July 13–19
- Edition: 40th
- Category: World Tour 250
- Draw: 32S / 16D
- Prize money: $488,225
- Surface: Grass / outdoor
- Location: Newport, Rhode Island, United States
- Venue: International Tennis Hall of Fame

Champions

Singles
- (United States) Rajeev Ram

Doubles
- (United Kingdom) Jonathan Marray / (Pakistan) Aisam-ul-Haq Qureshi
← 2014 ·	Hall of Fame Tennis Championships	· 2016 →

The 2015 Hall of Fame Tennis Championships was a men's tennis tournament played on outdoor grass courts. It was the 40th edition of the Hall of Fame Tennis Championships, and part of the ATP World Tour 250 series of the 2015 ATP World Tour. It took place at the International Tennis Hall of Fame in Newport, Rhode Island, United States, from July 13 through July 19, 2015.

Former world No. 8 and two-time Grand Slam finalist Mark Philippoussis contested his first match on the ATP World Tour in nine years after receiving a wild card into qualifying. He was 38 years of age.

== Singles main-draw entrants ==
=== Seeds ===
Country	Player	Rank^{1}	Seed
USA	John Isner	17	1
CRO	Ivo Karlović	25	2
AUS	Bernard Tomic	26	3
USA	Jack Sock	31	4
FRA	Adrian Mannarino	34	5
USA	Sam Querrey	36	6
USA	Steve Johnson	52	7
USA	Tim Smyczek	77	8

- ^{1} Rankings are as of June 29, 2015

=== Other entrants ===
The following players received wildcards into the singles main draw:

- (Germany) Tommy Haas
- (United States) Noah Rubin
- (Australia) Bernard Tomic

The following players received entry from the qualifying draw:

- (Switzerland) Adrien Bossel
- (Australia) Matthew Ebden
- (Czech Republic) Jan Hernych
- (Croatia) Ante Pavić

=== Withdrawals ===
Before the tournament

- (Croatia) Ivan Dodig →replaced by Jared Donaldson
- (Australia) James Duckworth →replaced by Illya Marchenko
- (Australia) Sam Groth →replaced by Yūichi Sugita
- (France) Nicolas Mahut →replaced by Niels Desein
- (Japan) Go Soeda →replaced by Édouard Roger-Vasselin
- (United States) Donald Young →replaced by Ryan Harrison

=== Retirements ===
- (Czech Republic) Jan Hernych

== Doubles main-draw entrants ==
=== Seeds ===
Country	Player	Country	Player	Rank^{1}	Seed
COL	Robert Farah	MEX	Santiago González	86	1
USA	Austin Krajicek	USA	Rajeev Ram	96	2
GBR	Jonathan Marray	PAK	Aisam-ul-Haq Qureshi	121	3
USA	Eric Butorac	GBR	Colin Fleming	123	4

- Rankings are as of June 29, 2015

=== Other entrants ===
The following pairs received wildcards into the doubles main draw:

- (Switzerland) Marco Chiudinelli / (Denmark) Frederik Nielsen
- (United States) Ryan Harrison / (Australia) Mark Philippoussis

== Finals ==
=== Singles ===
- (United States) Rajeev Ram defeated (Croatia) Ivo Karlović, 7–6^{(7–5)}, 5–7, 7–6^{(7–2)}

=== Doubles ===
- (United Kingdom) Jonathan Marray / (Pakistan) Aisam-ul-Haq Qureshi defeated (United States) Nicholas Monroe / (Croatia) Mate Pavić, 4–6, 6–3, [10–8]
