= 2014 Hall of Fame Tennis Championships – Singles =

Singles
- 2014 Hall of Fame Tennis Championships

Final
- Champion: (Australia) Lleyton Hewitt
- Runner-up: (Croatia) Ivo Karlović
- Score: 6–3, 6–7^{(4–7)}, 7–6^{(7–3)}

Details
- Draw: 32 (4 Q / 3 WC )
- Seeds: 8

Events
Singles	Doubles
- Hall of Fame Tennis Championships

Nicolas Mahut was the defending champion, but lost in the quarterfinals to Samuel Groth.

Lleyton Hewitt won the title, defeating Ivo Karlović in the final, 6–3, 6–7^{(4–7)}, 7–6^{(7–3)}.

== Seeds ==
1. (United States) John Isner (quarterfinals)
2. (Croatia) Ivo Karlović (final)
3. (Australia) Lleyton Hewitt (champion)
4. (France) Nicolas Mahut (quarterfinals)
5. (United States) Donald Young (first round)
6. (United States) Steve Johnson (quarterfinals)
7. (United States) Jack Sock (semifinals)
8. (France) Adrian Mannarino (second round)

== Draw ==
Key

- Q = Qualifier
- WC = Wild card
- LL = Lucky loser
- Alt = Alternate
- ITF = ITF entry
- PR = Protected ranking
- SR = Special ranking
- SE = Special exempt
- JE = Junior exempt
- JR = Junior Accelerator Programme entrant
- CO = College Accelerator Programme entrant
- NG = Next Gen Accelerator Program entrant
- w/o = Walkover
- r = Retired
- d = Defaulted

=== Finals ===
Semifinals
7	(United States) Jack Sock	1	2
3	(Australia) Lleyton Hewitt	6	6
(Australia) Samuel Groth	4	4
2	(Croatia) Ivo Karlović	6	6

Final
3	(Australia) Lleyton Hewitt	6	6^{4}	7^{7}
2	(Croatia) Ivo Karlović	3	7^{7}	6^{3}

=== Top half ===
First round
1	(United States) J Isner	6	7^{8}
Q	(United States) W Odesnik	3	6^{6}
(United States) T Smyczek	6^{7}	1
Q	(United States) A Krajicek	7^{9}	6
(Australia) M Ebden	2	5
(United States) R Ram	6	7
(United States) A Kuznetsov	4	3
7	(United States) J Sock	6	6
3	(Australia) L Hewitt	1	7	6
(United States) R Harrison	6	5	4
(Romania) M Copil	6^{0}	4
Q	(Croatia) A Pavić	7^{7}	6
WC	(United States) M Krueger	6^{7}	1
(Japan) T Ito	7^{9}	6
WC	(United States) C Thompson	1	2
6	(United States) S Johnson	6	6

Second round
1	(United States) J Isner	6	6
Q	(United States) A Krajicek	3	3
(United States) R Ram	5	2
7	(United States) J Sock	7	6
3	(Australia) L Hewitt	6	6
Q	(Croatia) A Pavić	2	2
(Japan) T Ito	3	0^{r}
6	(United States) S Johnson	6	2

Quarterfinals
1	(United States) J Isner	4	6^{4}
7	(United States) J Sock	6	7^{7}
3	(Australia) L Hewitt	6	6
6	(United States) S Johnson	4	4

Semifinals
7	(United States) J Sock	1	2
3	(Australia) L Hewitt	6	6

=== Bottom half ===
First round
5	(United States) D Young	6^{7}	2
(Australia) S Groth	7^{9}	6
(Lithuania) R Berankis	5	3
(Tunisia) M Jaziri	7	6
Q	(Australia) L Saville	6	6
(Canada) P Polansky	4	2
(Argentina) F Argüello	6^{1}	4
4	(France) N Mahut	7^{7}	6
8	(France) A Mannarino	6	6
(Chinese Taipei) J Wang	2	4
(Poland) M Przysiężny	1	6^{2}
(Israel) D Sela	6	7^{7}
(Ukraine) S Stakhovsky	6	6
(Uzbekistan) F Dustov	3	2
WC	(United States) R Ginepri	6^{2}	2
2	(Croatia) I Karlović	7^{7}	6

Second round
(Australia) S Groth	7^{9}	7^{7}
(Tunisia) M Jaziri	6^{7}	6^{3}
Q	(Australia) L Saville	4	2
4	(France) N Mahut	6	6
8	(France) A Mannarino	3	1
(Israel) D Sela	6	6
(Ukraine) S Stakhovsky	5	6^{3}
2	(Croatia) I Karlović	7	7^{7}

Quarterfinals
(Australia) S Groth	6	6
4	(France) N Mahut	3	4
(Israel) D Sela	6^{3}	5
2	(Croatia) I Karlović	7^{7}	7

Semifinals
(Australia) S Groth	4	4
2	(Croatia) I Karlović	6	6

== Qualifying ==
=== Seeds ===
1. (Croatia) Ante Pavić (qualified)
2. (Japan) Hiroki Moriya (qualifying competition)
3. (Belgium) Ruben Bemelmans (qualifying competition)
4. (Australia) John-Patrick Smith (qualifying competition)
5. (United States) Wayne Odesnik (qualified)
6. (United States) Austin Krajicek (qualified)
7. (Republic of Ireland) James McGee (qualifying competition)
8. (Australia) Luke Saville (qualified)

=== Qualifiers ===
1. (Croatia) Ante Pavić
2. (Australia) Luke Saville
3. (United States) Austin Krajicek
4. (United States) Wayne Odesnik

=== Qualifying draw ===
==== First qualifier ====
Second round
1	(Croatia) Ante Pavić	6	6
(Denmark) Frederik Nielsen	3	2
(New Zealand) Michael Venus	6	6^{3}	2
7	(Republic of Ireland) James McGee	4	7^{7}	6

Qualifying competition
1	(Croatia) Ante Pavić	6	4	7^{8}
7	(Republic of Ireland) James McGee	2	6	6^{6}

==== Second qualifier ====
Second round
2	(Japan) Hiroki Moriya	6	6
(India) Divij Sharan	2	3
(Uzbekistan) Sarvar Ikramov	0	0
8	(Australia) Luke Saville	6	6

Qualifying competition
2	(Japan) Hiroki Moriya	2	1
8	(Australia) Luke Saville	6	6

==== Third qualifier ====
Second round
3	(Belgium) Ruben Bemelmans	6^{8}	6	6
(Mexico) Gerardo López Villaseñor	7^{10}	3	1
(Switzerland) Adrien Bossel	2	1
6	(United States) Austin Krajicek	6	6

Qualifying competition
3	(Belgium) Ruben Bemelmans	6^{5}	6^{5}
6	(United States) Austin Krajicek	7^{7}	7^{7}

==== Fourth qualifier ====
First round				Second round					Qualifying competition
				4	(Australia) John-Patrick Smith	7^{8}	6
WC	(Hungary) Sándor Noszály	3	3		(Zimbabwe) Takanyi Garanganga	6^{6}	4
	(Zimbabwe) Takanyi Garanganga	6	6						4	(Australia) John-Patrick Smith	2	6^{6}
(United States) Kevin King		6	6						5	(United States) Wayne Odesnik	6	7^{8}
(Czech Republic) Jan Hernych		4	2		(United States) Kevin King	6	3	2
				5	(United States) Wayne Odesnik	3	6	6

== Bibliography ==
- Main Draw
- Qualifying Draw
