= 2012 Campbell's Hall of Fame Tennis Championships – Singles =

Singles
- 2012 Campbell's Hall of Fame Tennis Championships

Final
- Champion: (United States) John Isner
- Runner-up: (Australia) Lleyton Hewitt
- Score: 7–6^{(7–1)}, 6–4

Details
- Draw: 32 (4 Q / 3 WC )
- Seeds: 8

Events
Singles	Doubles
- Hall of Fame Tennis Championships

Defending champion John Isner successfully retained his title by beating Lleyton Hewitt 7–6^{(7–1)}, 6–4 in the final.

== Seeds ==
1. (United States) John Isner (champion)
2. (Japan) Kei Nishikori (quarterfinals)
3. (Canada) Milos Raonic (second round)
4. (Uzbekistan) Denis Istomin (first round)
5. (Russia) Alex Bogomolov Jr. (first round)
6. (United States) Ryan Harrison (semifinals)
7. (United States) Donald Young (first round)
8. (Luxembourg) Gilles Müller (first round)

== Draw ==
Key

- Q = Qualifier
- WC = Wild card
- LL = Lucky loser
- Alt = Alternate
- ITF = ITF entry
- PR = Protected ranking
- SR = Special ranking
- SE = Special exempt
- JE = Junior exempt
- JR = Junior Accelerator Programme entrant
- CO = College Accelerator Programme entrant
- NG = Next Gen Accelerator Program entrant
- w/o = Walkover
- r = Retired
- d = Defaulted

=== Finals ===
Semifinals
1	(United States) John Isner	7^{7}	6
6/WC	(United States) Ryan Harrison	6^{4}	3
WC	(Australia) Lleyton Hewitt	6	5	6
(United States) Rajeev Ram	4	7	2

Final
1	(United States) John Isner	7^{7}	6
WC	(Australia) Lleyton Hewitt	6^{1}	4

=== Top half ===
First round
1	(United States) J Isner	7^{7}	4	6
Q	(Ukraine) S Bubka	6^{3}	6	3
(France) N Mahut	6	7^{7}
(Switzerland) M Chiudinelli	0	6^{2}
WC	(United States) J Sock	7	1	6
(Russia) I Kunitsyn	5	6	4
Q	(South Africa) I van der Merwe	7^{7}	6^{3}	6
8	(Luxembourg) G Müller	6^{5}	7^{7}	4
3	(Canada) M Raonic	3	6	7
(Australia) M Ebden	6	3	5
Q	(Germany) B Becker	6	6
(Belgium) D Goffin	4	3
(Australia) M Matosevic	2	6^{8}
(United States) J Levine	6	7^{10}
(Belgium) R Bemelmans	6^{8}	7^{7}	5
6/WC	(United States) R Harrison	7^{10}	6^{5}	7

Second round
1	(United States) J Isner	6	7^{7}
(France) N Mahut	2	6^{2}
WC	(United States) J Sock	4	4
Q	(South Africa) I van der Merwe	6	6
3	(Canada) M Raonic	3	3
Q	(Germany) B Becker	6	6
(United States) J Levine	3	4
6/WC	(United States) R Harrison	6	6

Quarterfinals
1	(United States) J Isner	6	7^{7}
Q	(South Africa) I van der Merwe	4	6^{2}
Q	(Germany) B Becker	4	0^{r}
6/WC	(United States) R Harrison	6	3

Semifinals
1	(United States) J Isner	7^{7}	6
6/WC	(United States) R Harrison	6^{4}	3

=== Bottom half ===
First round
5	(Russia) A Bogomolov Jr.	5	6^{5}
(United States) S Querrey	7	7^{7}
(Israel) D Sela	6	6
(Canada) F Dancevic	0	2
(Canada) V Pospisil	1	1
WC	(Australia) L Hewitt	6	6
Q	(United States) T Smyczek	6	6
4	(Uzbekistan) D Istomin	3	3
7	(United States) D Young	6	1	4
(United States) M Russell	1	6	6
(Slovenia) G Žemlja	3	1
(United States) R Ram	6	6
(Belgium) O Rochus	6	3	6
(Japan) G Soeda	4	6	3
(Netherlands) I Sijsling	4	4
2	(Japan) K Nishikori	6	6

Second round
(United States) S Querrey	7	6^{6}	2
(Israel) D Sela	5	7^{8}	6
WC	(Australia) L Hewitt	6	2	6
Q	(United States) T Smyczek	4	6	1
(United States) M Russell	6^{6}	3
(United States) R Ram	7^{8}	6
(Belgium) O Rochus	7^{8}	4	2
2	(Japan) K Nishikori	6^{6}	6	6

Quarterfinals
(Israel) D Sela	4	3
WC	(Australia) L Hewitt	6	6
(United States) R Ram	7^{8}	6
2	(Japan) K Nishikori	6^{6}	3

Semifinals
WC	(Australia) L Hewitt	6	5	6
(United States) R Ram	4	7	2

== Qualifying ==
=== Seeds ===
1. (Germany) Benjamin Becker (qualified)
2. (Brazil) Ricardo Mello (second round)
3. (South Africa) Izak van der Merwe (qualified)
4. (Ukraine) Sergei Bubka (qualified)
5. (Thailand) Danai Udomchoke (qualifying competition)
6. (France) Adrian Mannarino (qualifying competition)
7. (United Kingdom) James Ward (first round)
8. (United States) Denis Kudla (first round)

=== Qualifiers ===
1. (Germany) Benjamin Becker
2. (United States) Tim Smyczek
3. (South Africa) Izak van der Merwe
4. (Ukraine) Sergei Bubka

=== Draw ===
==== First qualifier ====
First round
1	(Germany) Benjamin Becker	6	6
(South Africa) Raven Klaasen	2	4
(South Africa) Fritz Wolmarans	7^{7}	2	6
(Australia) Greg Jones	6^{3}	6	3
(United States) Alex Kuznetsov	6	6
WC	(United States) Bradley Klahn	3	4
(United States) Michael Yani	6	6
8	(United States) Denis Kudla	0	4

Second round
1	(Germany) Benjamin Becker	6	6
(South Africa) Fritz Wolmarans	1	4
(United States) Alex Kuznetsov	6	6
(United States) Michael Yani	4	1

Qualifying competition
1	(Germany) Benjamin Becker	2	7^{7}	6
(United States) Alex Kuznetsov	6	6^{1}	3

==== Second qualifier ====
First round
2	(Brazil) Ricardo Mello	7	4	6
WC	(United States) Christian Harrison	5	6	3
WC	(India) Rishabh Mehra	0	0
(United States) Tim Smyczek	6	6
(Switzerland) Adrien Bossel	7^{7}	4	6
(Russia) Mikhail Ledovskikh	6^{4}	6	4
(Croatia) Ante Pavić	7	5	4
5	(Thailand) Danai Udomchoke	5	7	6

Second round
2	(Brazil) Ricardo Mello	6	5	3
(United States) Tim Smyczek	4	7	6
(Switzerland) Adrien Bossel	7^{7}	2	4
5	(Thailand) Danai Udomchoke	6^{4}	6	6

Qualifying competition
(United States) Tim Smyczek	6	6
5	(Thailand) Danai Udomchoke	3	4

==== Third qualifier ====
First round
3	(South Africa) Izak van der Merwe	6^{6}	7^{7}	7
(Australia) James Duckworth	7^{8}	6^{5}	5
(Canada) Pierre-Ludovic Duclos	6	6
(Moldova) Roman Borvanov	3	3
Alt	(Japan) Yuichi Ito	3	2
(Japan) Toshihide Matsui	6	6
WC	(Jamaica) Brandon Burke	4	2
6	(France) Adrian Mannarino	6	6

Second round
3	(South Africa) Izak van der Merwe	6^{1}	7^{7}	6
(Canada) Pierre-Ludovic Duclos	7^{7}	6^{5}	4
(Japan) Toshihide Matsui	2	6^{4}
6	(France) Adrian Mannarino	6	7^{7}

Qualifying competition
3	(South Africa) Izak van der Merwe	4	6	6
6	(France) Adrian Mannarino	6	3	4

==== Fourth qualifier ====
First round
4	(Ukraine) Sergei Bubka	6	6
(Lithuania) Laurynas Grigelis	4	3
(Australia) Chris Guccione	7^{7}	7^{7}
(United Kingdom) Richard Bloomfield	6^{5}	6^{4}
(Chinese Taipei) Jimmy Wang	5	5
(United States) Steve Johnson	7	7
(France) Charles-Antoine Brézac	5	6	6
7	(United Kingdom) James Ward	7	2	1

Second round
4	(Ukraine) Sergei Bubka	7^{7}	7^{7}
(Australia) Chris Guccione	6^{5}	6^{4}
(United States) Steve Johnson	4	7^{7}	5
(France) Charles-Antoine Brézac	6	6^{2}	7

Qualifying competition
4	(Ukraine) Sergei Bubka	6	7^{7}
(France) Charles-Antoine Brézac	3	6^{5}
