= 2012 Campbell's Hall of Fame Tennis Championships – Doubles =

Doubles
- 2012 Campbell's Hall of Fame Tennis Championships

Final
- Champions: (Mexico) Santiago González (United States) Scott Lipsky
- Runners-up: (United Kingdom) Colin Fleming (United Kingdom) Ross Hutchins
- Score: 7–6(3), 6–3

Events
Singles	Doubles
← 2011 ·	Campbell's Hall of Fame Tennis Championships	· 2013 →

Matthew Ebden and Ryan Harrison were the defending champions but Harrison decided not to participate.
Ebden played alongside James Cerretani but lost in the first round.

== Seeds ==
1. (United States) Bob Bryan / (United States) Mike Bryan (withdrew)
2. (United Kingdom) Colin Fleming / (United Kingdom) Ross Hutchins (final)
3. (Mexico) Santiago González / (United States) Scott Lipsky (champions)
4. (United States) James Cerretani / (Australia) Matthew Ebden (first round)
5. (Czech Republic) Lukáš Dlouhý / (France) Nicolas Mahut (first round)

== Draw ==
=== Key ===
- Q = Qualifier
- WC = Wild card
- LL = Lucky loser
- Alt = Alternate
- SE = Special exempt
- PR = Protected ranking
- ITF = ITF entry
- JE = Junior exempt
- w/o = Walkover
- r = Retired
- d = Defaulted
- SR = Special ranking

=== Draw ===
First round
5	(Czech Republic) L Dlouhý (France) N Mahut	4	6	[7]
(United States) JP Fruttero (Uzbekistan) D Istomin	6	1	[10]
(United States) R Ram (United States) M Russell	5	6	[7]
Alt	(South Africa) R Klaasen (South Africa) I van der Merwe	7	4	[10]
3	(Mexico) S González (United States) S Lipsky	6	7^{7}
(Australia) M Matosevic (Slovenia) G Žemlja	4	6^{4}
(Belgium) D Goffin (Belgium) O Rochus	7	3	[8]
(Russia) A Bogomolov Jr. (Luxembourg) G Müller	5	6	[10]
WC	(United States) S Johnson (United States) D Kudla	4	1
(Philippines) TC Huey (United Kingdom) D Inglot	6	6
WC	(Australia) C Guccione (Australia) L Hewitt	6	6
4	(United States) J Cerretani (Australia) M Ebden	3	4
(Japan) K Nishikori (Japan) G Soeda	6	2	[10]
(Australia) C Ball (Canada) A Shamasdin	4	6	[7]
(Canada) V Pospisil (United States) S Querrey	6^{4}	5
2	(United Kingdom) C Fleming (United Kingdom) R Hutchins	7^{7}	7

Quarterfinals
(United States) JP Fruttero (Uzbekistan) D Istomin	3	2
Alt	(South Africa) R Klaasen (South Africa) I van der Merwe	6	6
3	(Mexico) S González (United States) S Lipsky	7^{8}	6^{3}	[10]
(Russia) A Bogomolov Jr. (Luxembourg) G Müller	6^{6}	7^{7}	[7]
(Philippines) TC Huey (United Kingdom) D Inglot	7	6
WC	(Australia) C Guccione (Australia) L Hewitt	5	3
(Japan) K Nishikori (Japan) G Soeda	3	6	[4]
2	(United Kingdom) C Fleming (United Kingdom) R Hutchins	6	1	[10]

Semifinals
Alt	(South Africa) R Klaasen (South Africa) I van der Merwe	3	4
3	(Mexico) S González (United States) S Lipsky	6	6
(Philippines) TC Huey (United Kingdom) D Inglot	6^{4}	4
2	(United Kingdom) C Fleming (United Kingdom) R Hutchins	7^{7}	6

Final
3	(Mexico) S González (United States) S Lipsky	7^{7}	6
2	(United Kingdom) C Fleming (United Kingdom) R Hutchins	6^{3}	3
