= 2014 Hall of Fame Tennis Championships =

- Date: July 7–13
- Edition: 39th
- Category: World Tour 250
- Draw: 32S / 16D
- Prize money: $474,005
- Surface: Grass / outdoor
- Location: Newport, Rhode Island, U.S.
- Venue: International Tennis Hall of Fame

Champions

Singles
- (Australia) Lleyton Hewitt

Doubles
- (Australia) Chris Guccione / (Australia) Lleyton Hewitt
← 2013 ·	Hall of Fame Tennis Championships	· 2015 →

The 2014 Hall of Fame Tennis Championships was a men's tennis tournament played on outdoor grass courts. It was the 39th edition of the Hall of Fame Tennis Championships, and was part of the ATP World Tour 250 series of the 2014 ATP World Tour. It took place at the International Tennis Hall of Fame in Newport, Rhode Island, United States, from July 7 through July 13, 2014. Third-seeded Lleyton Hewitt won the singles title.

== Singles main draw entrants ==
=== Seeds ===
Country	Player	Rank^{1}	Seed
USA	John Isner	11	1
CRO	Ivo Karlović	32	2
AUS	Lleyton Hewitt	48	3
FRA	Nicolas Mahut	54	4
USA	Donald Young	69	5
USA	Steve Johnson	70	6
USA	Jack Sock	77	7
FRA	Adrian Mannarino	81	8

- ^{1} Rankings are as of June 23, 2014

=== Other entrants ===
The following players received wildcards into the singles main draw:

- (United States) Robby Ginepri
- (United States) Mitchell Krueger
- (United States) Clay Thompson

The following players received entry from the qualifying draw:

- (United States) Austin Krajicek
- (United States) Wayne Odesnik
- (Croatia) Ante Pavić
- (Australia) Luke Saville

=== Withdrawals ===
Before the tournament

- (Cyprus) Marcos Baghdatis
- (Croatia) Ivan Dodig
- (Dominican Republic) Víctor Estrella Burgos
- (United States) Bradley Klahn
- (United States) Sam Querrey

=== Retirements ===
- (Japan) Tatsuma Ito

== Doubles main draw entrants ==
=== Seeds ===
Country	Player	Country	Player	Rank^{1}	Seed
MEX	Santiago González	USA	Scott Lipsky	79	1
CAN	Daniel Nestor	CAN	Adil Shamasdin	113	2
AUS	Matthew Ebden	AUS	Samuel Groth	120	3
GBR	Ken Skupski	GBR	Neal Skupski	133	4

- Rankings are as of June 23, 2014

== Finals ==
=== Singles ===
- (Australia) Lleyton Hewitt defeated (Croatia) Ivo Karlović, 6–3, 6–7^{(4–7)}, 7–6^{(7–3)}

=== Doubles ===
- (Australia) Chris Guccione / (Australia) Lleyton Hewitt defeated (Israel) Jonathan Erlich / (United States) Rajeev Ram, 7–5, 6–4
