= 2015 Hall of Fame Tennis Championships – Singles =

Singles
- 2015 Hall of Fame Tennis Championships

Final
- Champion: (United States) Rajeev Ram
- Runner-up: (Croatia) Ivo Karlović
- Score: 7–6^{(7–5)}, 5–7, 7–6^{(7–2)}

Details
- Draw: 32 (4 Q / 3 WC )
- Seeds: 8

Events
Singles	Doubles
- Hall of Fame Tennis Championships

Lleyton Hewitt was the defending champion, but chose to participate in the Davis Cup quarterfinals instead.
Rajeev Ram won the title, defeating Ivo Karlović in the final, 7–6^{(7–5)}, 5–7, 7–6^{(7–2)}.

== Seeds ==
1. (United States) John Isner (first round)
2. (Croatia) Ivo Karlović (final)
3. (Australia) Bernard Tomic (first round)
4. (United States) Jack Sock (semifinals)
5. (France) Adrian Mannarino (quarterfinals)
6. (United States) Sam Querrey (second round)
7. (United States) Steve Johnson (second round)
8. (United States) Tim Smyczek (first round)

== Draw ==
Key

- Q = Qualifier
- WC = Wild card
- LL = Lucky loser
- Alt = Alternate
- ITF = ITF entry
- PR = Protected ranking
- SR = Special ranking
- SE = Special exempt
- JE = Junior exempt
- JR = Junior Accelerator Programme entrant
- CO = College Accelerator Programme entrant
- NG = Next Gen Accelerator Program entrant
- w/o = Walkover
- r = Retired
- d = Defaulted

=== Finals ===
Semifinals
(United States) Rajeev Ram	6	7^{7}
(Australia) John-Patrick Smith	4	6^{4}
4	(United States) Jack Sock	6^{3}	4
2	(Croatia) Ivo Karlović	7^{7}	6

Final
(United States) Rajeev Ram	7^{7}	5	7^{7}
2	(Croatia) Ivo Karlović	6^{5}	7	6^{2}

=== Top half ===
First round
1	(United States) J Isner	7^{7}	3	6^{8}
(United States) R Ram	6^{5}	6	7^{10}
(United States) R Harrison	1	7	3
(Japan) Y Sugita	6	5	6
(France) É Roger-Vasselin	4	6	6
(Slovenia) B Kavčič	6	3	2
WC	(Germany) T Haas	7^{7}	6^{1}	4
5	(France) A Mannarino	6^{5}	7^{7}	6
3/WC	(Australia) B Tomic	3	5
(Australia) J-P Smith	6	7
(United States) J Donaldson	6^{5}	6	6
(United States) A Krajicek	7^{7}	3	2
WC	(United States) N Rubin	3	7^{9}	4
(Japan) T Ito	6	6^{7}	6
(Germany) M Berrer	7^{8}	1	2
7	(United States) S Johnson	6^{6}	6	6

Second round
(United States) R Ram	6	6
(Japan) Y Sugita	4	3
(France) É Roger-Vasselin	6	3	2
5	(France) A Mannarino	1	6	6
(Australia) J-P Smith	6	6
(United States) J Donaldson	3	1
(Japan) T Ito	6	6
7	(United States) S Johnson	4	4

Quarterfinals
(United States) R Ram	2	7^{10}	7^{7}
5	(France) A Mannarino	6	6^{8}	6^{2}
(Australia) J-P Smith	6	6^{2}	6
(Japan) T Ito	3	7^{7}	3

Semifinals
(United States) R Ram	6	7^{7}
(Australia) J-P Smith	4	6^{4}

=== Bottom half ===
First round
8	(United States) T Smyczek	3	4
Q	(Czech Republic) J Hernych	6	6
(Spain) A Menéndez-Maceiras	1	5
(Colombia) A Falla	6	7
(Belgium) N Desein	3	6	2
(Slovakia) L Lacko	6	3	6
PR	(Czech Republic) R Štěpánek	2	0
4	(United States) J Sock	6	6
6	(United States) S Querrey	7^{7}	7^{7}
Q	(Australia) M Ebden	6^{3}	6^{1}
Q	(Switzerland) A Bossel	6^{4}	3
(Germany) D Brown	7^{7}	6
Q	(Croatia) A Pavić	2	6	5
(Tunisia) M Jaziri	6	4	7
(Ukraine) I Marchenko	6^{4}	7^{8}	4
2	(Croatia) I Karlović	7^{7}	6^{6}	6

Second round
Q	(Czech Republic) J Hernych	7^{7}	6^{6}	7^{9}
(Colombia) A Falla	6^{5}	7^{8}	6^{7}
(Slovakia) L Lacko	6	6^{4}	4
4	(United States) J Sock	3	7^{7}	6
6	(United States) S Querrey	2	6	4
(Germany) D Brown	6	4	6
(Tunisia) M Jaziri	4	6^{4}
2	(Croatia) I Karlović	6	7^{7}

Quarterfinals
Q	(Czech Republic) J Hernych	1^{r}
4	(United States) J Sock	0
(Germany) D Brown	6^{3}	3
2	(Croatia) I Karlović	7^{7}	6

Semifinals
4	(United States) J Sock	6^{3}	4
2	(Croatia) I Karlović	7^{7}	6

== Qualifying ==
=== Seeds ===
1. (Australia) Matthew Ebden (qualified)
2. (United Kingdom) Brydan Klein (qualifying competition)
3. (Australia) Luke Saville (qualifying competition)
4. (Czech Republic) Jan Hernych (qualified)
5. (United States) Alexander Sarkissian (first round)
6. (Chinese Taipei) Jason Jung (qualifying competition)
7. (Australia) Alex Bolt (second round)
8. (Denmark) Frederik Nielsen (first round)

=== Qualifiers ===
1. (Australia) Matthew Ebden
2. (Switzerland) Adrien Bossel
3. (Croatia) Ante Pavić
4. (Czech Republic) Jan Hernych

=== Qualifying draw ===
==== First qualifier ====
First round
1	(Australia) Matthew Ebden	6	7^{7}
(Croatia) Mate Pavić	4	6^{2}
(Belarus) Alexander Bury	1	4
(Switzerland) Marco Chiudinelli	6	6
(Australia) Greg Jones	3	6	3
(United States) Ryan Haviland	6	2	6
(United States) Michael Grant	4	3
6	(Chinese Taipei) Jason Jung	6	6

Second round
1	(Australia) Matthew Ebden	6^{4}	6	4
(Switzerland) Marco Chiudinelli	7^{7}	4	1^{r}
(United States) Ryan Haviland	6	6^{5}	2
6	(Chinese Taipei) Jason Jung	3	7^{7}	6

Qualifying competition
1	(Australia) Matthew Ebden	7^{7}	3	6
6	(Chinese Taipei) Jason Jung	6^{5}	6	1

==== Second qualifier ====
First round
2	(United Kingdom) Brydan Klein	6^{3}	7	6
(United Kingdom) Colin Fleming	7^{7}	5	3
WC	(United States) Nicholas Hu	6^{4}	5
(Croatia) Matija Pecotić	7^{7}	7
WC	(United States) Patrick Davidson	6^{9}	3
(Australia) Harry Bourchier	7^{11}	6
(Switzerland) Adrien Bossel	6	6
8	(Denmark) Frederik Nielsen	1	3

Second round
2	(United Kingdom) Brydan Klein	6	6
(Croatia) Matija Pecotić	2	3
(Australia) Harry Bourchier	6^{6}	4
(Switzerland) Adrien Bossel	7^{8}	6

Qualifying competition
2	(United Kingdom) Brydan Klein	6^{5}	5
(Switzerland) Adrien Bossel	7^{7}	7

==== Third qualifier ====
First round
3	(Australia) Luke Saville	3	6	6
WC	(Mexico) Gerardo López Villaseñor	6	2	4
(France) Tom Jomby	3	5
(Australia) Andrew Whittington	6	7
(France) Arthur Surreaux	6^{6}	1
(Croatia) Ante Pavić	7^{7}	6
(Ukraine) Dmitriy Kamynin	0	3
7	(Australia) Alex Bolt	6	6

Second round
3	(Australia) Luke Saville	6	4	7
(Australia) Andrew Whittington	1	6	5
(Croatia) Ante Pavić	6^{2}	7^{7}	6
7	(Australia) Alex Bolt	7^{7}	6^{5}	2

Qualifying competition
3	(Australia) Luke Saville	3	4
(Croatia) Ante Pavić	6	6

==== Fourth qualifier ====
First round
4	(Czech Republic) Jan Hernych	4	7^{7}	6
(Australia) Matt Reid	6	6^{5}	4
WC	(Australia) Mark Philippoussis	6^{1}	6^{4}
(United States) Eric Quigley	7^{7}	7^{7}
(Italy) Erik Crepaldi	3	1
(Brazil) Henrique Cunha	6	6
(Germany) Frank Moser	6	3	6
5	(United States) Alexander Sarkissian	3	6	2

Second round
4	(Czech Republic) Jan Hernych	6	6
(United States) Eric Quigley	3	2
(Brazil) Henrique Cunha	2	6	6
(Germany) Frank Moser	6	4	1

Qualifying competition
4	(Czech Republic) Jan Hernych	6	7^{7}
(Brazil) Henrique Cunha	0	6^{4}

== Sources ==
- Main Draw
- Qualifying Draw
