= 2013 Hall of Fame Tennis Championships – Singles =

Singles
- 2013 Hall of Fame Tennis Championships

Final
- Champion: (France) Nicolas Mahut
- Runner-up: (Australia) Lleyton Hewitt
- Score: 5–7, 7–5, 6–3

Details
- Draw: 32 (4 Q / 3 WC )
- Seeds: 8

Events
Singles	Doubles
- Hall of Fame Tennis Championships

John Isner was the two-time defending champion, but was defeated by 2012 finalist Lleyton Hewitt in the semifinals. Nicolas Mahut defeated Hewitt in the final 5–7, 7–5, 6–3.

== Seeds ==
1. (United States) Sam Querrey (first round)
2. (United States) John Isner (semifinals)
3. (Netherlands) Igor Sijsling (quarterfinals)
4. (Australia) Lleyton Hewitt (final)
5. (France) Édouard Roger-Vasselin (first round)
6. (Australia) Marinko Matosevic (first round, retired because of fatigue)
7. (France) Kenny de Schepper (first round)
8. (United States) Rajeev Ram (second round)

== Draw ==
Key

- Q = Qualifier
- WC = Wild card
- LL = Lucky loser
- Alt = Alternate
- ITF = ITF entry
- PR = Protected ranking
- SR = Special ranking
- SE = Special exempt
- JE = Junior exempt
- JR = Junior Accelerator Programme entrant
- CO = College Accelerator Programme entrant
- NG = Next Gen Accelerator Program entrant
- w/o = Walkover
- r = Retired
- d = Defaulted

=== Finals ===
Semifinals
WC	(France) Nicolas Mahut	6	6
(United States) Michael Russell	2	2
4	(Australia) Lleyton Hewitt	5	6	6
2	(United States) John Isner	7	2	4

Final
WC	(France) Nicolas Mahut	5	7	6
4	(Australia) Lleyton Hewitt	7	5	3

=== Top half ===
First round
1	(United States) S Querrey	4	6^{8}
(United States) T Smyczek	6	7^{10}
WC	(France) N Mahut	6	6
(United States) R Williams	2	4
WC	(United States) S Kozlov	3	7^{11}	4
(Poland) M Przysiężny	6	6^{9}	6
Q	(Switzerland) A Bossel	2	2
8	(United States) R Ram	6	6
3	(Netherlands) I Sijsling	6	6
(Italy) M Viola	4	1
(Canada) J Levine	5	5
(Japan) Y Sugita	7	7
(United States) M Russell	6	4	6
(Ukraine) I Marchenko	1	6	4
Q	(United States) A Kuznetsov	6	6
7	(France) K de Schepper	3	4

Second round
(United States) T Smyczek	2	4
WC	(France) N Mahut	6	6
(Poland) M Przysiężny	2	7	6
8	(United States) R Ram	6	5	3
3	(Netherlands) I Sijsling	6	6
(Japan) Y Sugita	3	4
(United States) M Russell	6	6
Q	(United States) A Kuznetsov	3	4

Quarterfinals
WC	(France) N Mahut	7^{7}	6
(Poland) M Przysiężny	6^{5}	4
3	(Netherlands) I Sijsling	6^{3}	7^{8}	6^{5}
(United States) M Russell	7^{7}	6^{6}	7^{7}

Semifinals
WC	(France) N Mahut	6	6
(United States) M Russell	2	2

=== Bottom half ===
First round
6	(Australia) M Matosevic	2	0^{r}
(United States) J Sock	6	0
Q	(Czech Republic) J Hernych	7^{8}	6
Q	(Croatia) A Pavić	6^{6}	3
WC	(India) P Amritraj	6	6
(Italy) F Cipolla	2	3
(Australia) M Ebden	4	1
4	(Australia) L Hewitt	6	6
5	(France) É Roger-Vasselin	6^{5}	4
(Croatia) I Karlović	7^{7}	6
(United States) D Kudla	6	3	3
(Canada) V Pospisil	1	6	6
(France) A Mannarino	6	5	6
(United States) J Blake	4	7	1
(United States) R Harrison	6^{0}	2
2	(United States) J Isner	7^{7}	6

Second round
(United States) J Sock	3	6	4
Q	(Czech Republic) J Hernych	6	4	6
WC	(India) P Amritraj	2	1
4	(Australia) L Hewitt	6	6
(Croatia) I Karlović	6	1	6
(Canada) V Pospisil	4	6	3
(France) A Mannarino	0	6^{7}
2	(United States) J Isner	6	7^{9}

Quarterfinals
Q	(Czech Republic) J Hernych	7^{7}	4	2
4	(Australia) L Hewitt	6^{3}	6	6
(Croatia) I Karlović	6^{3}	6^{3}
2	(United States) J Isner	7^{7}	7^{7}

Semifinals
4	(Australia) L Hewitt	5	6	6
2	(United States) J Isner	7	2	4

== Qualifying ==
=== Seeds ===
All seeds received a bye into the second round.

1. (Belgium) Ruben Bemelmans (second round, retired)
2. (Germany) Mischa Zverev (second round)
3. (Chinese Taipei) Jimmy Wang (second round)
4. (United States) Alex Kuznetsov (qualified)
5. (Czech Republic) Jan Hernych (qualified)
6. (Uzbekistan) Farrukh Dustov (qualifying competition)
7. (Australia) John-Patrick Smith (qualifying competition)
8. (Ukraine) Denys Molchanov (second round)

=== Qualifiers ===
1. (Croatia) Ante Pavić
2. (Switzerland) Adrien Bossel
3. (Czech Republic) Jan Hernych
4. (United States) Alex Kuznetsov

=== Qualifying draw ===
==== First qualifier ====
First round			Second round					Qualifying competition
			1	(Belgium) Ruben Bemelmans	7^{10}	6^{5}	0^{r}
(United States) Krasimir Kolev	1	0		(Croatia) Ante Pavić	6^{8}	7^{7}	0
(Croatia) Ante Pavić	6	6							(Croatia) Ante Pavić	4	6	7^{7}
(Brazil) Marcelo Demoliner	5	1						7	(Australia) John-Patrick Smith	6	3	6^{3}
(Switzerland) Stéphane Bohli	7	6		(Switzerland) Stéphane Bohli	6^{3}	5
			7	(Australia) John-Patrick Smith	7^{7}	7

==== Second qualifier ====
First round				Second round					Qualifying competition
				2	(Germany) Mischa Zverev	4	3
WC	(United States) Christo Schultz	0	3		(Canada) Érik Chvojka	6	6
	(Canada) Érik Chvojka	6	6						(Canada) Érik Chvojka	6	6^{8}	4
(Australia) Adam Feeney		6^{3}	3						(Switzerland) Adrien Bossel	2	7^{10}	6
(Switzerland) Adrien Bossel		7^{7}	6		(Switzerland) Adrien Bossel	4	7^{8}	6
				8	(Ukraine) Denys Molchanov	6	6^{6}	4

==== Third qualifier ====
First round				Second round					Qualifying competition
				3	(Chinese Taipei) Jimmy Wang	6	3	4
(Serbia) Ilija Bozoljac	6	6			(Serbia) Ilija Bozoljac	3	6	6
(United States) Eric Quigley	4	3								(Serbia) Ilija Bozoljac	7^{16}	5	2
(United States) Jared Donaldson	3	6	1						5	(Czech Republic) Jan Hernych	6^{14}	7	6
(Germany) Frank Moser	6	4	0^{r}		(United States) Jared Donaldson	1	3
				5	(Czech Republic) Jan Hernych	6	6

==== Fourth qualifier ====
First round			Second round					Qualifying competition
			4	(United States) Alex Kuznetsov	6	4	6
(United States) Christian Harrison	6	6		(United States) Christian Harrison	2	6	4
(Zimbabwe) Takura Happy	0	4						4	(United States) Alex Kuznetsov	6^{6}	7^{7}	6
(Zimbabwe) Takanyi Garanganga	7^{7}	7						6	(Uzbekistan) Farrukh Dustov	7^{8}	6^{4}	2
(United States) Jason Jung	6^{4}	5		(Zimbabwe) Takanyi Garanganga	3	5
			6	(Uzbekistan) Farrukh Dustov	6	7
