= 2013 Hall of Fame Tennis Championships =

- Date: July 8–14
- Edition: 38th
- Category: World Tour 250
- Draw: 32S / 16D
- Prize money: $455,775
- Surface: Grass / outdoor
- Location: Newport, Rhode Island, US
- Venue: International Tennis Hall of Fame

Champions

Singles
- (France) Nicolas Mahut

Doubles
- (France) Nicolas Mahut / (France) Édouard Roger-Vasselin
← 2012 ·	Hall of Fame Tennis Championships	· 2014 →

The 2013 Hall of Fame Tennis Championships was a men's tennis tournament played on outdoor grass courts. It was the 38th edition of the Hall of Fame Tennis Championships, and was part of the ATP World Tour 250 series of the 2013 ATP World Tour. It took place at the International Tennis Hall of Fame in Newport, Rhode Island, United States, from July 8 through July 14, 2013. Unseeded Nicolas Mahut, who received a wildcard for the main draw, won the singles title.

== Singles main draw entrants ==
=== Seeds ===
Country	Player	Rank^{1}	Seed
USA	Sam Querrey	19	1
USA	John Isner	21	2
NED	Igor Sijsling	64	3
AUS	Lleyton Hewitt	70	4
FRA	Édouard Roger-Vasselin	71	5
AUS	Marinko Matosevic	72	6
FRA	Kenny de Schepper	80	7
USA	Rajeev Ram	86	8

- ^{1} Seedings are based on the rankings of June 24, 2013

=== Other entrants ===
The following players received wildcards into the singles main draw:

- (India) Prakash Amritraj
- (United States) Stefan Kozlov
- (France) Nicolas Mahut

The following players received entry from the qualifying draw:

- (Switzerland) Adrien Bossel
- (Czech Republic) Jan Hernych
- (United States) Alex Kuznetsov
- (Croatia) Ante Pavić

=== Withdrawals ===
Before the tournament

- (United States) Brian Baker
- (Argentina) Federico Delbonis

=== Retirements ===
- (Australia) Marinko Matosevic (food poisoning)

== Doubles main draw entrants ==
=== Seeds ===
Country	Player	Country	Player	Rank^{1}	Seed
MEX	Santiago González	USA	Scott Lipsky	45	1
FRA	Nicolas Mahut	FRA	Édouard Roger-Vasselin	76	2
USA	James Blake	USA	Rajeev Ram	140	3
BRA	Marcelo Demoliner	BRA	André Sá	144	4

- Rankings are as of June 24, 2013

=== Other entrants ===
The following pairs received wildcards into the doubles main draw:

- (India) Prakash Amritraj / (United States) Sam Querrey
- (United States) Chris Harrison / (United States) Ryan Harrison

The following pair received entry as alternates:

- (Venezuela) Eduardo Gil / (United States) Krasimir Kolev

=== Withdrawals ===
Before the tournament

- (United States) Ryan Harrison (back injury)

During the tournament

- (United States) Sam Querrey (elbow injury)

== Finals ==
=== Singles ===
- (France) Nicolas Mahut defeated (Australia) Lleyton Hewitt, 5–7, 7–5, 6–3

=== Doubles ===
- (France) Nicolas Mahut / (France) Édouard Roger-Vasselin defeated (United States) Tim Smyczek / (United States) Rhyne Williams, 6–7^{(4–7)}, 6–2, [10–5]
