= 2012 Campbell's Hall of Fame Tennis Championships =

- Date: July 9–15
- Edition: 37th
- Category: ATP World Tour 250 series
- Surface: Grass / outdoor
- Location: Newport, Rhode Island, United States
- Venue: International Tennis Hall of Fame

Champions

Singles
- (United States) John Isner

Doubles
- (Mexico) Santiago González / (United States) Scott Lipsky
- Hall of Fame Tennis Championships

The 2012 Hall of Fame Tennis Championships (also known as the Campbell's Hall of Fame Tennis Championships for sponsorship reasons) was a men's tennis tournament played on outdoor grass courts. It was the 37th edition of the Hall of Fame Tennis Championships, and was part of the ATP World Tour 250 series of the 2012 ATP World Tour. It took place at the International Tennis Hall of Fame in Newport, Rhode Island, United States, from July 9 through July 15, 2012. John Isner won the singles title.

== Finals ==
=== Singles ===
(United States) John Isner defeated (Australia) Lleyton Hewitt, 7–6^{(7–1)}, 6–4

=== Doubles ===
(Mexico) Santiago González / (United States) Scott Lipsky defeated (United Kingdom) Colin Fleming / (United Kingdom) Ross Hutchins, 7–6^{(7–3)}, 6–3

== Singles main-draw entrants ==
=== Seeds ===
Country	Player	Rank^{1}	Seed
USA	John Isner	10	1
JPN	Kei Nishikori	20	2
CAN	Milos Raonic	22	3
UZB	Denis Istomin	39	4
RUS	Alex Bogomolov Jr.	46	5
USA	Ryan Harrison	48	6
USA	Donald Young	51	7
LUX	Gilles Müller	53	8

- ^{1} Seedings are based on the rankings of June 25, 2012

=== Other entrants ===
The following players received wildcards into the singles main draw:

- (United States) Ryan Harrison
- (Australia) Lleyton Hewitt
- (United States) Jack Sock

The following players received entry from the qualifying draw:

- (Germany) Benjamin Becker
- (Ukraine) Sergey Bubka
- (United States) Tim Smyczek
- (South Africa) Izak van der Merwe

=== Withdrawals ===
- (Slovakia) Lukáš Lacko → replaced by (United States) Jesse Levine
- (Belgium) Xavier Malisse → replaced by (Slovenia) Grega Žemlja

== Doubles main-draw entrants ==
=== Seeds ===
Country	Player	Country	Player	Rank^{1}	Seed
~~USA~~	~~Bob Bryan~~	~~USA~~	~~Mike Bryan~~	~~6~~	~~1~~
GBR	Colin Fleming	GBR	Ross Hutchins	53	2
MEX	Santiago González	USA	Scott Lipsky	72	3
USA	James Cerretani	AUS	Matthew Ebden	111	4
CZE	Lukáš Dlouhý	FRA	Nicolas Mahut	134	5

- Rankings are as of June 25, 2012

=== Other entrants ===
The following pairs received wildcards into the doubles main draw:

- (Australia) Chris Guccione / (Australia) Lleyton Hewitt
- (United States) Steve Johnson / (United States) Denis Kudla

The following pair received entry as alternates:

- (South Africa) Raven Klaasen / (South Africa) Izak van der Merwe

=== Withdrawals ===
- (Germany) Benjamin Becker (shoulder injury)
