= 2016 European Open =

- Date: 17–23 October
- Edition: 1st
- Category: ATP World Tour 250 series
- Draw: 28S / 16D
- Prize money: €566,525
- Surface: Hard / indoor
- Location: Antwerp, Belgium
- Venue: Lotto Arena

Champions

Singles
- (France) Richard Gasquet

Doubles
- (Canada) Daniel Nestor / (France) Édouard Roger-Vasselin
- European Open

The 2016 European Open was a men's tennis tournament played on indoor hard courts. It was the 1st edition of the European Open and part of the ATP World Tour 250 series of the 2016 ATP World Tour. It took place at the Lotto Arena in Antwerp, Belgium, from 17 October until 23 October 2016. Third-seeded Richard Gasquet won the singles title.

== Finals ==
=== Singles ===
(France) Richard Gasquet defeated (Argentina) Diego Schwartzman, 7–6^{(7–4)}, 6–1

- It was Gasquet's 2nd and last singles title of the year and the 14th of his career.

=== Doubles ===
(Canada) Daniel Nestor / (France) Édouard Roger-Vasselin defeated (France) Pierre-Hugues Herbert / (France) Nicolas Mahut, 6–4, 6–4

== Singles main-draw entrants ==
=== Seeds ===
Country	Player	Rank^{1}	Seed
BEL	David Goffin	12	1
ESP	David Ferrer	15	2
FRA	Richard Gasquet	17	3
URU	Pablo Cuevas	22	4
FRA	Gilles Simon	32	5
POR	João Sousa	34	6
FRA	Nicolas Mahut	39	7
ARG	Federico Delbonis	46	8

- ^{1} Rankings are as of October 10, 2016

=== Other entrants ===
The following players received wildcards into the singles main draw:

- (Belgium) Steve Darcis
- (Belgium) Joris De Loore
- (Spain) Tommy Robredo

The following players received entry from the qualifying draw:

- (Germany) Michael Berrer
- (Romania) Marius Copil
- (Slovakia) Jozef Kovalík
- (Germany) Yannick Maden

=== Withdrawals ===
Before the tournament

- (Croatia) Borna Ćorić →replaced by (Spain) Íñigo Cervantes
- (Ukraine) Alexandr Dolgopolov →replaced by (Germany) Jan-Lennard Struff

== Doubles main-draw entrants ==
=== Seeds ===
Country	Player	Country	Player	Rank^{1}	Seed
FRA	Pierre-Hugues Herbert	FRA	Nicolas Mahut	3	1
CAN	Daniel Nestor	FRA	Édouard Roger-Vasselin	32	2
AUT	Oliver Marach	FRA	Fabrice Martin	71	3
URU	Pablo Cuevas	ESP	David Marrero	83	4

- ^{1} Rankings are as of October 10, 2016

=== Other entrants ===
The following pairs received wildcards into the doubles main draw:

- (Belgium) Kimmer Coppejans / (United States) Taylor Fritz
- (Belgium) Steve Darcis / (Belgium) Joris De Loore

=== Withdrawals ===
During the tournament

- (France) Paul-Henri Mathieu (left hip injury)
