= 2016 European Open – Singles =

Singles
- 2016 European Open

Final
- Champion: (France) Richard Gasquet
- Runner-up: (Argentina) Diego Schwartzman
- Score: 7–6^{(7–4)}, 6–1

Details
- Draw: 28 (4 Q / 3 WC )
- Seeds: 8

Events
Singles	Doubles
European Open	· 2017 →

This was the first edition of the tournament.

Richard Gasquet won the title, defeating Diego Schwartzman in the final, 7–6^{(7–4)}, 6–1.

== Seeds ==
The top four seeds receive a bye into the second round.

1. (Belgium) David Goffin (semifinals)
2. (Spain) David Ferrer (second round)
3. (France) Richard Gasquet (champion)
4. (Uruguay) Pablo Cuevas (quarterfinals)
5. (France) Gilles Simon (second round)
6. (Portugal) João Sousa (first round)
7. (France) Nicolas Mahut (first round)
8. (Argentina) Federico Delbonis (first round)

== Draw ==
=== Key ===
- Q = Qualifier
- WC = Wild card
- LL = Lucky loser
- Alt = Alternate
- SE = Special exempt
- PR = Protected ranking
- ITF = ITF entry
- JE = Junior exempt
- w/o = Walkover
- r = Retired
- d = Defaulted
- SR = Special ranking

=== Finals ===
Semifinals
1	(Belgium) David Goffin	5	6	5
(Argentina) Diego Schwartzman	7	2	7
3	(France) Richard Gasquet	3	7	6
(United Kingdom) Kyle Edmund	6	5	2

Final
(Argentina) Diego Schwartzman	6^{4}	1
3	(France) Richard Gasquet	7^{7}	6

=== Top half ===
First round
WC	(Spain) T Robredo	2	2
(Germany) F Mayer	6	6
WC	(Belgium) S Darcis	6^{6}	6	6
(France) B Paire	7^{8}	1	4
Q	(Romania) M Copil	4	6	6
6	(Portugal) J Sousa	6	3	3
Q	(Slovakia) J Kovalík	6	6
(Spain) G García López	3	3
(United States) T Fritz	3	6	6
WC	(Belgium) J De Loore	6	4	4
(Argentina) D Schwartzman	7^{7}	7
7	(France) N Mahut	6^{2}	5

Second round
1	(Belgium) D Goffin	7	6
(Germany) F Mayer	5	4
WC	(Belgium) S Darcis	6^{3}	2
Q	(Romania) M Copil	7^{7}	6
4	(Uruguay) P Cuevas	6	7^{7}
Q	(Slovakia) J Kovalík	4	6^{4}
(United States) T Fritz	4	4
(Argentina) D Schwartzman	6	6

Quarterfinals
1	(Belgium) D Goffin	5	6	6
Q	(Romania) M Copil	7	1	3
4	(Uruguay) P Cuevas	6^{8}	3
(Argentina) D Schwartzman	7^{10}	6

Semifinals
1	(Belgium) D Goffin	5	6	5
(Argentina) D Schwartzman	7	2	7

=== Bottom half ===
First round
5	(France) G Simon	6	6
Q	(Germany) Y Maden	3	2
(Germany) J-L Struff	6^{3}	6	6
(Russia) M Youzhny	7^{7}	3	0
(Spain) Í Cervantes	6	3	6
Q	(Germany) M Berrer	1	6	1
8	(Argentina) F Delbonis	6^{7}	7	3
(Italy) A Seppi	7^{9}	5	6
(Netherlands) R Haase	6	6
(France) P-H Mathieu	4	2
(United Kingdom) K Edmund	7^{9}	7^{7}
(Ukraine) I Marchenko	6^{7}	6^{5}

Second round
5	(France) G Simon	4	4
(Germany) J-L Struff	6	6
(Spain) Í Cervantes	2	4
3	(France) R Gasquet	6	6
(Italy) A Seppi	7	7
(Netherlands) R Haase	5	5
(United Kingdom) K Edmund	6	3	7^{7}
2	(Spain) D Ferrer	1	6	6^{3}

Quarterfinals
(Germany) J-L Struff	2	4
3	(France) R Gasquet	6	6
(Italy) A Seppi	3	4
(United Kingdom) K Edmund	6	6

Semifinals
3	(France) R Gasquet	3	7	6
(United Kingdom) K Edmund	6	5	2

== Qualifying ==
=== Seeds ===
1. (France) Pierre-Hugues Herbert (qualifying competition)
2. (Georgia (country)) Nikoloz Basilashvili (first round)
3. (Slovakia) Jozef Kovalík (qualified)
4. (France) Vincent Millot (first round)
5. (Germany) Michael Berrer (qualified)
6. (France) Kenny de Schepper (qualifying competition)
7. (Belgium) Kimmer Coppejans (qualifying competition)
8. (Romania) Marius Copil (qualified)

=== Qualifiers ===
1. (Romania) Marius Copil
2. (Germany) Michael Berrer
3. (Slovakia) Jozef Kovalík
4. (Germany) Yannick Maden

=== Qualifying draw ===
==== First qualifier ====
First round
1	(France) Pierre-Hugues Herbert	4	6	7^{7}
WC	(Belgium) Zizou Bergs	6	1	6^{4}
(Czech Republic) Václav Šafránek	3	0
8	(Romania) Marius Copil	6	6

Qualifying competition
1	(France) Pierre-Hugues Herbert	3	6	3
8	(Romania) Marius Copil	6	4	6

==== Second qualifier ====
First round
2	(Georgia (country)) Nikoloz Basilashvili	3	4
(Russia) Alexey Vatutin	6	6
(Germany) Peter Torebko	3	2
5	(Germany) Michael Berrer	6	6

Qualifying competition
(Russia) Alexey Vatutin	6^{7}	4
5	(Germany) Michael Berrer	7^{9}	6

==== Third qualifier ====
First round
3	(Slovakia) Jozef Kovalík	6	6
(Belgium) Germain Gigounon	2	1
PR	(France) Albano Olivetti	1	7^{10}	4
6	(France) Kenny de Schepper	6	6^{8}	6

Qualifying competition
3	(Slovakia) Jozef Kovalík	6	7^{8}
6	(France) Kenny de Schepper	4	6^{6}

==== Fourth qualifier ====
First round
4	(France) Vincent Millot	3	2
(Germany) Yannick Maden	6	6
WC	(Spain) Pablo Andújar	6^{1}	3
7	(Belgium) Kimmer Coppejans	7^{7}	6

Qualifying competition
(Germany) Yannick Maden	6	6
7	(Belgium) Kimmer Coppejans	2	3
