= 2014 Hall of Fame Tennis Championships – Doubles =

Doubles
- 2014 Hall of Fame Tennis Championships

Final
- Champions: (Australia) Chris Guccione (Australia) Lleyton Hewitt
- Runners-up: (Israel) Jonathan Erlich (United States) Rajeev Ram
- Score: 7–5, 6–4

Events
Singles	Doubles
← 2013 ·	Hall of Fame Tennis Championships	· 2015 →

Nicolas Mahut and Édouard Roger-Vasselin were the defending champions, but Roger-Vasselin chose not to participate. Mahut played alongside Sergiy Stakhovsky, but lost in the semifinals to Jonathan Erlich and Rajeev Ram.
Chris Guccione and Lleyton Hewitt won the title, defeating Erlich and Ram in the final, 7–5, 6–4.

== Seeds ==
1. (Mexico) Santiago González / (United States) Scott Lipsky (first round)
2. (Canada) Daniel Nestor / (Canada) Adil Shamasdin (quarterfinals)
3. (Australia) Matthew Ebden / (Australia) Samuel Groth (quarterfinals)
4. (United Kingdom) Ken Skupski / (United Kingdom) Neal Skupski (first round)

== Draw ==
=== Key ===
- Q = Qualifier
- WC = Wild card
- LL = Lucky loser
- Alt = Alternate
- SE = Special exempt
- PR = Protected ranking
- ITF = ITF entry
- JE = Junior exempt
- w/o = Walkover
- r = Retired
- d = Defaulted
- SR = Special ranking

=== Draw ===
First round
1	(Mexico) S González (United States) S Lipsky	7^{7}	6^{3}	[7]
(India) D Sharan (United States) D Young	6^{1}	7^{7}	[10]
(United States) R Harrison (New Zealand) M Venus	3	4
(Australia) C Guccione (Australia) L Hewitt	6	6
3	(Australia) M Ebden (Australia) S Groth	5	6	[10]
(United States) K King (Poland) M Przysiężny	7	2	[6]
(United States) A Krajicek (Australia) J-P Smith	6	6
(Uzbekistan) F Dustov (Croatia) A Pavić	3	2
(United States) A Kuznetsov (Canada) P Polansky	6	5	[5]
(Thailand) Sa Ratiwatana (Thailand) So Ratiwatana	3	7	[10]
(Israel) J Erlich (United States) R Ram	5	6	[10]
4	(United Kingdom) K Skupski (United Kingdom) N Skupski	7	4	[6]
(France) N Mahut (Ukraine) S Stakhovsky	7	4	[13]
(Belgium) R Bemelmans (Romania) M Copil	5	6	[11]
(Germany) P Marx (Denmark) F Nielsen	4	4
2	(Canada) D Nestor (Canada) A Shamasdin	6	6

Quarterfinals
(India) D Sharan (United States) D Young	5	3
(Australia) C Guccione (Australia) L Hewitt	7	6
3	(Australia) M Ebden (Australia) S Groth	3	4
(United States) A Krajicek (Australia) J-P Smith	6	6
(Thailand) Sa Ratiwatana (Thailand) So Ratiwatana	5	6^{1}
(Israel) J Erlich (United States) R Ram	7	7^{7}
(France) N Mahut (Ukraine) S Stakhovsky	6	6
2	(Canada) D Nestor (Canada) A Shamasdin	3	4

Semifinals
(Australia) C Guccione (Australia) L Hewitt	7^{7}	6
(United States) A Krajicek (Australia) J-P Smith	6^{1}	1
(Israel) J Erlich (United States) R Ram	7^{7}	7
(France) N Mahut (Ukraine) S Stakhovsky	6^{3}	5

Final
(Australia) C Guccione (Australia) L Hewitt	7	6
(Israel) J Erlich (United States) R Ram	5	4
