= 2016 European Open – Doubles =

Doubles
- 2016 European Open

Final
- Champions: (Canada) Daniel Nestor (France) Édouard Roger-Vasselin
- Runners-up: (France) Pierre-Hugues Herbert (France) Nicolas Mahut
- Score: 6–4, 6–4

Events
Singles	Doubles
European Open	· 2017 →

This was the first edition of the tournament.

Daniel Nestor and Édouard Roger-Vasselin won the title, defeating Pierre-Hugues Herbert and Nicolas Mahut in the final, 6–4, 6–4.

== Seeds ==
1. (France) Pierre-Hugues Herbert / (France) Nicolas Mahut (final)
2. (Canada) Daniel Nestor / (France) Édouard Roger-Vasselin (champions)
3. (Austria) Oliver Marach / (France) Fabrice Martin (semifinals)
4. (Uruguay) Pablo Cuevas / (Spain) David Marrero (quarterfinals)

== Draw ==
=== Key ===
- Q = Qualifier
- WC = Wild card
- LL = Lucky loser
- Alt = Alternate
- ITF = ITF entry
- PR = Protected ranking
- SR = Special ranking
- SE = Special exempt
- JE = Junior exempt
- JR = Junior Accelerator Programme entrant
- CO = College Accelerator Programme entrant
- NG = Next Gen Accelerator Program entrant
- w/o = Walkover
- r = Retired
- d = Defaulted

=== Draw ===
First round
1	(France) P-H Herbert (France) N Mahut	6	6
(Spain) G García-López (Serbia) N Zimonjić	0	3
WC	(Belgium) K Coppejans (United States) T Fritz	4	6	[5]
(Argentina) F Delbonis (Argentina) D Schwartzman	6	2	[10]
4	(Uruguay) P Cuevas (Spain) D Marrero	6	7^{7}
(Israel) J Erlich (Mexico) S González	4	6^{5}
WC	(Belgium) S Darcis (Belgium) J De Loore	4	4
(United Kingdom) D Inglot (Brazil) A Sá	6	6
(India) J Nedunchezhiyan (Belarus) A Vasilevski	3	3
(United States) N Monroe (New Zealand) A Sitak	6	6
(New Zealand) M Daniell (Brazil) M Demoliner	6^{3}	6	[6]
3	(Austria) O Marach (France) F Martin	7^{7}	2	[10]
(Germany) F Moser (Russia) M Youzhny	6	3	[1]
(Ukraine) I Marchenko (Ukraine) D Molchanov	0	6	[10]
(France) P-H Mathieu (France) B Paire
2	(Canada) D Nestor (France) É Roger-Vasselin	w/o

Quarterfinals
1	(France) P-H Herbert (France) N Mahut	6^{4}	6	[10]
(Argentina) F Delbonis (Argentina) D Schwartzman	7^{7}	4	[5]
4	(Uruguay) P Cuevas (Spain) D Marrero	5	6	[9]
(United Kingdom) D Inglot (Brazil) A Sá	7	3	[11]
(United States) N Monroe (New Zealand) A Sitak	0	4
3	(Austria) O Marach (France) F Martin	6	6
(Ukraine) I Marchenko (Ukraine) D Molchanov	4	7^{7}	[10]
2	(Canada) D Nestor (France) É Roger-Vasselin	6	6^{4}	[12]

Semifinals
1	(France) P-H Herbert (France) N Mahut	6	6
(United Kingdom) D Inglot (Brazil) A Sá	3	2
3	(Austria) O Marach (France) F Martin	7^{7}	4	[8]
2	(Canada) D Nestor (France) É Roger-Vasselin	6^{5}	6	[10]

Final
1	(France) P-H Herbert (France) N Mahut	4	4
2	(Canada) D Nestor (France) É Roger-Vasselin	6	6
