= 2013 Hall of Fame Tennis Championships – Doubles =

Doubles
- 2013 Hall of Fame Tennis Championships

Final
- Champions: (France) Nicolas Mahut (France) Édouard Roger-Vasselin
- Runners-up: (United States) Tim Smyczek (United States) Rhyne Williams
- Score: 6–7^{(4–7)}, 6–2, [10–5]

Events
Singles	Doubles
← 2012 ·	Hall of Fame Tennis Championships	· 2014 →

Santiago González and Scott Lipsky were the defending champions, but lost in the first round to Denis Kudla and Michael Russell.
Nicolas Mahut and Édouard Roger-Vasselin won the title, defeating Tim Smyczek and Rhyne Williams, 6–7^{(4–7)}, 6–2, [10–5].

== Seeds ==
1. (Mexico) Santiago González / (United States) Scott Lipsky (first round)
2. (France) Nicolas Mahut / (France) Édouard Roger-Vasselin (champions)
3. (United States) James Blake / (United States) Rajeev Ram (first round)
4. (Brazil) Marcelo Demoliner / (Brazil) André Sá (semifinals)

== Draw ==
=== Key ===
- Q = Qualifier
- WC = Wild card
- LL = Lucky loser
- Alt = Alternate
- SE = Special exempt
- PR = Protected ranking
- ITF = ITF entry
- JE = Junior exempt
- w/o = Walkover
- r = Retired
- d = Defaulted
- SR = Special ranking

=== Draw ===
First round
1	(Mexico) S González (United States) S Lipsky	6	6^{6}	4
(United States) D Kudla (United States) M Russell	4	7^{8}	[10]
(United States) T Smyczek (United States) R Williams	6	6
(Australia) M Matosevic (Germany) F Moser	3	2
3	(United States) J Blake (United States) R Ram	4	7^{7}	[6]
(Canada) A Shamasdin (Australia) J-P Smith	6	6^{3}	[10]
(Ukraine) I Marchenko (Ukraine) D Molchanov	6	6^{1}	[9]
(Croatia) I Karlović (India) D Sharan	4	7^{7}	[11]
(Australia) M Ebden (Netherlands) I Sijsling	6	6
Alt	(Venezuela) E Gil (United States) K Kolev	2	1
(Australia) C Guccione (Australia) L Hewitt	6	3	[5]
4	(Brazil) M Demoliner (Brazil) A Sá	4	6	[10]
(Belgium) R Bemelmans (Poland) M Przysiężny	6	3	[5]
WC	(India) P Amritraj (United States) S Querrey	4	6	[10]
(United States) J Cerretani (France) K de Schepper	3	4
2	(France) N Mahut (France) É Roger-Vasselin	6	6

Quarterfinals
(United States) D Kudla (United States) M Russell	2	3
(United States) T Smyczek (United States) R Williams	6	6
(Canada) A Shamasdin (Australia) J-P Smith	4	6	[17]
(Croatia) I Karlović (India) D Sharan	6	4	[19]
(Australia) M Ebden (Netherlands) I Sijsling	3	2
4	(Brazil) M Demoliner (Brazil) A Sá	6	6
WC	(India) P Amritraj (United States) S Querrey
2	(France) N Mahut (France) É Roger-Vasselin	w/o

Semifinals
(United States) T Smyczek (United States) R Williams	7^{7}	6^{5}	[10]
(Croatia) I Karlović (India) D Sharan	6^{2}	7^{7}	[8]
4	(Brazil) M Demoliner (Brazil) A Sá	4	6^{4}
2	(France) N Mahut (France) É Roger-Vasselin	6	7^{7}

Final
(United States) T Smyczek (United States) R Williams	7^{7}	2	[5]
2	(France) N Mahut (France) É Roger-Vasselin	6^{4}	6	[10]
