= 2015 Hall of Fame Tennis Championships – Doubles =

Doubles
- 2015 Hall of Fame Tennis Championships

Final
- Champions: (United Kingdom) Jonathan Marray (Pakistan) Aisam-ul-Haq Qureshi
- Runners-up: (United States) Nicholas Monroe (Croatia) Mate Pavić
- Score: 4–6, 6–3, [10–8]

Events
Singles	Doubles
← 2014 ·	Hall of Fame Tennis Championships	· 2016 →

Chris Guccione and Lleyton Hewitt were the defending champions, but Hewitt chose to participate in the Davis Cup quarterfinals instead. Guccione played alongside Matthew Ebden, but lost in the first round to Johan Brunström and Marcelo Demoliner.
Jonathan Marray and Aisam-ul-Haq Qureshi won the title, defeating Nicholas Monroe and Mate Pavić in the final, 4–6, 6–3, [10–8].

== Seeds ==
1. (Colombia) Robert Farah / (Mexico) Santiago González (first round)
2. (United States) Austin Krajicek / (United States) Rajeev Ram (semifinals)
3. (United Kingdom) Jonathan Marray / (Pakistan) Aisam-ul-Haq Qureshi (champions)
4. (United States) Eric Butorac / (United Kingdom) Colin Fleming (first round)

== Draw ==
=== Key ===
- Q = Qualifier
- WC = Wild card
- LL = Lucky loser
- Alt = Alternate
- SE = Special exempt
- PR = Protected ranking
- ITF = ITF entry
- JE = Junior exempt
- w/o = Walkover
- r = Retired
- d = Defaulted
- SR = Special ranking

First round
1	(Colombia) R Farah (Mexico) S González	3	5
(United States) N Monroe (Croatia) M Pavić	6	7
(Sweden) J Brunström (Brazil) M Demoliner	7^{9}	7^{7}
(Australia) M Ebden (Australia) C Guccione	6^{7}	6^{4}
4	(United States) E Butorac (United Kingdom) C Fleming	6^{1}	3
WC	(Switzerland) M Chiudinelli (Denmark) F Nielsen	7^{7}	6
(France) F Martin (India) P Raja	7^{8}	7
(Tunisia) M Jaziri (Germany) F Moser	6^{6}	5
(Germany) D Brown (Australia) J-P Smith	3	6	[10]
(Belarus) A Bury (Sweden) A Siljeström	6	3	[12]
(Netherlands) W Koolhof (Netherlands) M Middelkoop	3	3
3	(United Kingdom) J Marray (Pakistan) A-u-H Qureshi	6	6
(Japan) T Ito (Slovakia) L Lacko	3	4
WC	(United States) R Harrison (Australia) M Philippoussis	6	6
(Ukraine) I Marchenko (Spain) A Menéndez-Maceiras	7^{7}	4	[6]
2	(United States) A Krajicek (United States) R Ram	6^{3}	6	[10]

Quarterfinals
(United States) N Monroe (Croatia) M Pavić	6	3	[10]
(Sweden) J Brunström (Brazil) M Demoliner	3	6	[6]
WC	(Switzerland) M Chiudinelli (Denmark) F Nielsen	6^{5}	6^{5}
(France) F Martin (India) P Raja	7^{7}	7^{7}
(Belarus) A Bury (Sweden) A Siljeström	3	4
3	(United Kingdom) J Marray (Pakistan) A-u-H Qureshi	6	6
WC	(United States) R Harrison (Australia) M Philippoussis	4	3
2	(United States) A Krajicek (United States) R Ram	6	6

Semifinals
(United States) N Monroe (Croatia) M Pavić	4	7^{8}	[10]
(France) F Martin (India) P Raja	6	6^{6}	[6]
3	(United Kingdom) J Marray (Pakistan) A-u-H Qureshi	6^{4}	6	[10]
2	(United States) A Krajicek (United States) R Ram	7^{7}	2	[6]

Final
(United States) N Monroe (Croatia) M Pavić	6	3	[8]
3	(United Kingdom) J Marray (Pakistan) A-u-H Qureshi	4	6	[10]
