= Adrien Bossel =

Swiss tennis player

- Full name: Adrien Bossel
- Country (sports): Switzerland
- Born: 28 December 1986 (age 38); Fribourg, Switzerland
- Retired: 2019
- Plays: Left-handed (two handed-backhand)
- Coach: Arnaud Fontaine
- Prize money: $149,514

Singles
- Career record: 0–5 (at ATP Tour level, Grand Slam level, and in Davis Cup)
- Career titles: 0
- Highest ranking: No. 262 (10 August 2015)

Doubles
- Career record: 1-7 (at ATP Tour level, Grand Slam level, and in Davis Cup)
- Career titles: 0
- Highest ranking: No. 401 (15 October 2012)
- Last updated on: 1 January 2025.

Adrien Bossel (born 28 December 1986) is a Swiss former tennis player. He has a career-high ATP singles ranking of world No. 262 achieved on 10 August 2015. He also has a career-high doubles ranking of No. 401 achieved on 15 October 2012.

Bossel made his ATP main-draw debut at the 2012 Swiss Indoors in the doubles event partnering Henri Laaksonen, but they lost in the first round to Kevin Anderson and Viktor Troicki.

At the 2013 Hall of Fame Tennis Championships, Bossel qualified for the tournament by defeating Adam Feeney, Denys Molchanov and Érik Chvojka in the qualifying rounds. In the main draw, he lost to the eighth seed Rajeev Ram.
