= Nicolas Mahut =

French tennis player (born 1982)

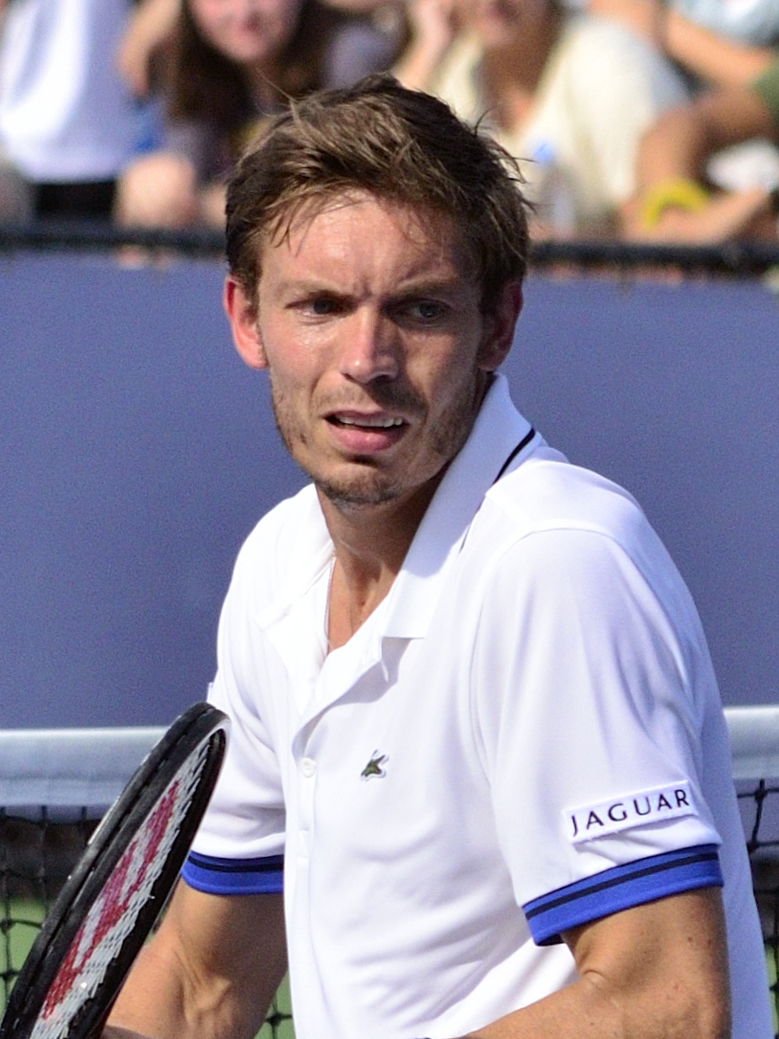
- Mahut at the 2013 US Open
- Full name: Nicolas Pierre Armand Mahut
- Country (sports): France
- Residence: Boulogne-Billancourt, France
- Born: 21 January 1982 (age 44) Angers, France
- Height: 1.91 m (6 ft 3 in)
- Turned pro: 2000
- Retired: 28 October 2025
- Plays: Right-handed (one-handed backhand)
- Coach: Thierry Ascione (2012–2015); Nicolas Escudé (2013); Mark Woodforde (2016–2017); Gabriel Urpí, Jérôme Haehnel (–2021), Nicolas Copin, Nicolas Renavand (2022–)
- Prize money: US$12,886,495

Singles
- Career record: 181–225
- Career titles: 4
- Highest ranking: No. 37 (5 May 2014)

Grand Slam singles results
- Australian Open: 3R (2012)
- French Open: 3R (2012, 2015, 2019)
- Wimbledon: 4R (2016)
- US Open: 3R (2016, 2017)

Doubles
- Career record: 472–308
- Career titles: 37
- Highest ranking: No. 1 (6 June 2016)

Grand Slam doubles results
- Australian Open: W (2019)
- French Open: W (2018, 2021)
- Wimbledon: W (2016)
- US Open: W (2015)

Other doubles tournaments
- Tour Finals: W (2019, 2021)
- Olympic Games: 1R (2016, 2020)

Grand Slam mixed doubles results
- Australian Open: 1R (2017, 2019)
- French Open: 2R (2010, 2023)
- Wimbledon: QF (2023)

Other mixed doubles tournaments
- Olympic Games: 1R (2016, 2020)

Team competitions
- Davis Cup: W (2017)

Nicolas Pierre Armand Mahut (French pronunciation: [nikɔla pjɛʁ aʁmɑ̃ may]; born 21 January 1982) is a French former professional tennis player. He was ranked world No. 1 in men's doubles, holding the top ranking for a total of 39 weeks. Mahut is a five-time Grand Slam champion in doubles, having completed the career Grand Slam with victories at the 2015 US Open, 2016 Wimbledon Championships, 2018 French Open, and 2019 Australian Open, all partnering Pierre-Hugues Herbert.

The pair also won the 2021 French Open and finished runners-up at the 2015 Australian Open, and Mahut was runner-up at the 2013 French Open and 2019 Wimbledon Championships, with Michaël Llodra and Édouard Roger-Vasselin respectively. Mahut won 37 doubles titles overall, including the 2019 and 2021 ATP Finals. He also won seven Masters 1000 titles in doubles.

In singles, Mahut reached a career-high ATP ranking of world No. 37 in May 2014, and won four tour-level titles, all on grass courts. His best major result in singles was at the 2016 Wimbledon Championships, where he reached the fourth round. At the 2010 Championships, Mahut was part of the longest match in professional tennis history, against John Isner in the first round. Isner defeated him 70–68 in the fifth set after over 11 hours of play.

== Early and personal life ==
Nicolas Mahut was born in 1982 in Angers, France. He first trained at the Beaucouzé tennis club when he was five years old. He joined a tennis club in Paris when he was 11. He currently lives in Boulogne-Billancourt, a suburb of Paris near the grounds of Roland Garros. He met his wife Virginie in 2007 and she gave birth to their son Natanel (Nathanaël) on 18 August 2011. Mahut became good friends with the American tennis player John Isner, after they played together in the longest professional tennis match ever at Wimbledon 2010, which lasted over 11 hours. He was coached by former professional players Gabriel Urpí and Jérôme Haehnel. He is currently coached by Nicolas Copain and Nicolas Renavand.

== Career ==
Mahut had excellent junior results, winning the Orange Bowl in 1999 and the Wimbledon Boys' Singles in 2000, turning professional the same year. His career-high singles ranking is world No. 37, achieved in July 2014. Mahut was runner-up to Andy Roddick at the 2007 Queen's Club Championships, and runner-up that same year at the Hall of Fame Tennis Championships, in Newport, Rhode Island. In June 2013, he won his first ATP singles title, winning the Rosmalen Grass Court Championships in the Netherlands, and he followed it up in July by winning the Hall of Fame Tennis Championships in Newport, Rhode Island.

Mahut is known for being part of the longest match in professional tennis history against John Isner in the first round of the 2010 Wimbledon Championships. He holds a number of tennis records and awards for the match, including the most points won in a single match (502) and most games won by a losing player (91).

Mahut is also a prolific doubles player, reaching a career high of world No. 1 on 6 June 2016. He has won doubles titles with countrymen Julien Benneteau, Arnaud Clément, and Édouard Roger-Vasselin, before his most successful and current partnership with Pierre-Hugues Herbert. In 2013, he and Michaël Llodra lost the final of the French Open. In 2015, Mahut, with Pierre-Hugues Herbert, lost the final of the Australian Open but won the US Open doubles title. In 2016, with Pierre-Hugues Herbert, he won the Wimbledon doubles title.

=== 1998–99: Juniors years ===
In 1998, Mahut was champion of France for 15- and 16-year-olds and the 17- and 18-year-olds. 1999 saw Mahut win the Orange Bowl doubles title. In addition, Mahut was the winner of the Sunshine Cup, the 35th Coffee Bowl, and the Coupe Galéa-Valério. In Grand Slams, he won the 2000 Wimbledon Championships Boys' Singles, the 2000 Australian Open Boys' Doubles (alongside Tommy Robredo) and the 1999 US Open Boys' Doubles (alongside Julien Benneteau).

As a junior Mahut posted a 93–33 record in singles and a 76–21 record in doubles. He reached as high as No. 3 in singles and No. 1 in doubles (in January 2000 and December 1999 respectively).

=== 2000–02: Grand Slam debut ===
Mahut made his grand slam debut at the 2000 French Open. He won three minor titles on the ITF Men's Circuit.

=== 2003: Breaking the 100 and first doubles title ===
2003 saw Mahut leapfrog in the rankings to breaking the top 100. September saw him collect his first doubles title at the Open de Moselle.

=== 2004: US open doubles semifinal & second doubles title ===
The highlight of his season was making the doubles semifinal at the 2004 US Open, losing to eventual champions Mark Knowles & Daniel Nestor.

=== 2005: Breaking the doubles top 25 ===
January saw him ranked up to 25th in the world, a career high he wouldn’t break until 2013. In February, at the Cherbourg Challenger in Cherbourg, France he defeated future 24 time grand slam champion Novak Djokovic in 3 sets.

=== 2006: Return to top singles 100 ===
Three challenger titles & making the third round at Wimbledon saw him return to the top 100 in the singles rankings.

=== 2007: First ATP singles final ===
In June, at the Queen's Club Championships, he was awarded runner-up losing to Andy Roddick 6–4, 6–7(7–9), 6–7(2–7). He repeated that solid form the following month, making the final at the Campbell's Hall of Fame Championships. losing to Fabrice Santoro 4–6, 4–6.

=== 2008: 50 career singles wins ===
At the Rome masters, he collected his 50th career singles victory.

=== 2009: Third doubles title ===
October saw Mahut collect his third doubles title at the Grand Prix de Tennis de Lyon

=== 2010: Longest match in tennis history ===
Mahut reached the 2010 Wimbledon Singles Championship via the qualifiers, during which he beat Alex Bogdanovic in a marathon match, winning 6–3, 3–6, 24–22. A week later, he was beaten in the first round of the championship proper by John Isner in the longest match in tennis history (see below), Isner winning 6–4, 3–6, 6–7, 7–6, 70–68. Mahut also reached the qualifiers for the 2010 US Open but lost to Júlio Silva in the third qualifying round.

=== 2011: First doubles masters 1000 final ===
His continued success with Julien Benneteau saw them reach new heights at the 2011 BNP Paribas Masters, collecting the runner-up to Rohan Bopanna & Aisam-ul-Haq Qureshi.

=== 2012: Three doubles titles ===
Partnering with Édouard Roger-Vasselin, together the collected titles at the Open Sud de France, the Open 13 & the Moselle Open.

=== 2013: First ATP singles titles; French Open doubles runner-up ===
Teaming up with doubles veteran Michaël Llodra, Mahut made his first doubles grand slam final at the French Open. They lost to the Bryan brothers in three sets.

Mahut received a wildcard for the men's singles at Wimbledon and therefore did not have to play the qualifying tournament. He therefore decided to play at the 's-Hertogenbosch ATP tournament in Holland which ran at the same time. Mahut had to qualify for the event but went on to win his first ATP singles title, with a straight sets victory over Stanislas Wawrinka in the final. Mahut did not lose a set and his serve was only broken once during the tournament. As a result of his win, his ranking increased by more than 100 places, and he entered the top 125. Mahut received a wildcard for the 2013 Wimbledon tournament, and reached the second round where he lost to Tommy Robredo.

After Wimbledon, Mahut received a wildcard for the 2013 Hall of Fame Tennis Championships. He went on to win the title, his second ATP tour championship in the space of a month, after defeating Lleyton Hewitt in three sets in the final, despite Hewitt serving for the match at 5–4 in the second set. Mahut's victory saw him enter the top 100 in the singles rankings, reaching number 75. As a result of rain delays, Mahut had played both the singles semi-final and final and the doubles semi-final with partner Édouard Roger-Vasselin on 14 July, and the doubles final was postponed to the following day as a result. The following day, Mahut and Roger-Vasselin won the doubles tournament by defeating Tim Smyczek and Rhyne Williams. On 15 July 2013, he achieved a new career high ranking of 23.

=== 2014: Career-high singles ranking ===
After quite a successful 2013 season, especially in singles, Mahut didn't enjoy much success in 2014. For the majority of the year in singles, Mahut did not need to play through qualifying to advance to the main draw thanks to the good results he compiled from 2013, but only won 38% of the tour-level matches he played. He failed to advance past the first round in every Grand Slam, which was the first time in his career. Mahut did not reach a tour-level semifinals throughout the entire season. During the season Mahut reached 3 tour-level quarterfinals as well as two Challenger finals.

However, Mahut enjoyed success in doubles. He reached the semifinals of Brisbane partnering Roger Federer to start off the season. The following week Mahut and Llodra lost in the first round at Sydney in the deciding tiebreak. The week after at the Australian Open, Mahut and Llodra were seeded 13th and reached the semifinals for the first time in his career without dropping a set, including wins against 2nd seeds Alexander Peya and Bruno Soares in the 3rd round and 5th seeds Leander Paes and Radek Štěpánek in the quarterfinals. Mahut then participated at Montepeiller partnering Marc Gicquel, where they reached the final without dropping a set, losing in 3 sets to another unseeded pair Nikolay Davydenko and Denis Istomin. Mahut's good form continued into next week, where he participated in Rotterdam with Llodra, and won the tournament while only dropping a set. Mahut then reached the quarterfinals of the Indian Wells Masters partnering Jo-Wilfried Tsonga, losing to world No. 1s the Bryan brothers in 2 tiebreaks. The next week at the Miami Masters, Mahut and Llodra reached the semifinals, again they were defeated by the Bryan Brothers, also in straight sets.

Mahut then lost 4 consecutive matches before the French Open. At the French Open, Mahut and Llodra were seeded 5th, but were forced to retire during the third round after only playing 3 games. The next week, Mahut and Tsonga fell in the first round of the Queen's Club, after winning the first set in a tiebreaker and losing the second set in another tiebreak, and lost 12–14 in the decider tiebreak. At Wimbledon, he and Llodra were seeded 12th, and reached the semifinals for the first time in his career while only dropping one set en route, and was once more denied by the Bryan Brothers, also in straight sets. The week after Wimbledon, he partnered Sergiy Stakhovsky at the Hall of Fame Tennis Championships, and reached the semifinals where they were defeated in straight sets.

For the remainder of the season Mahut failed to win consecutive tour-level doubles matches, but won 2 Challengers near the end of the season, at Mons, Belgium, partnering Gicquel, without dropping a set in the process, and at Mouilleron Le Captif, France, partnering Pierre-Hugues Herbert and did not drop a set en route either. It was also his last tournament of the year during the last week of the regular season.

=== 2015: US Open doubles champion ===
At the Australian Open, Mahut participated in both singles and doubles draw. He fell in the first round of qualifying in singles, but battled his way to his second appearance in a Grand Slam men's doubles final. Mahut and Herbert, unseeded, lost the final against the unseeded Italians Simone Bolelli and Fabio Fognini. However, this marked the beginning of one of the most successful doubles pair in tennis.

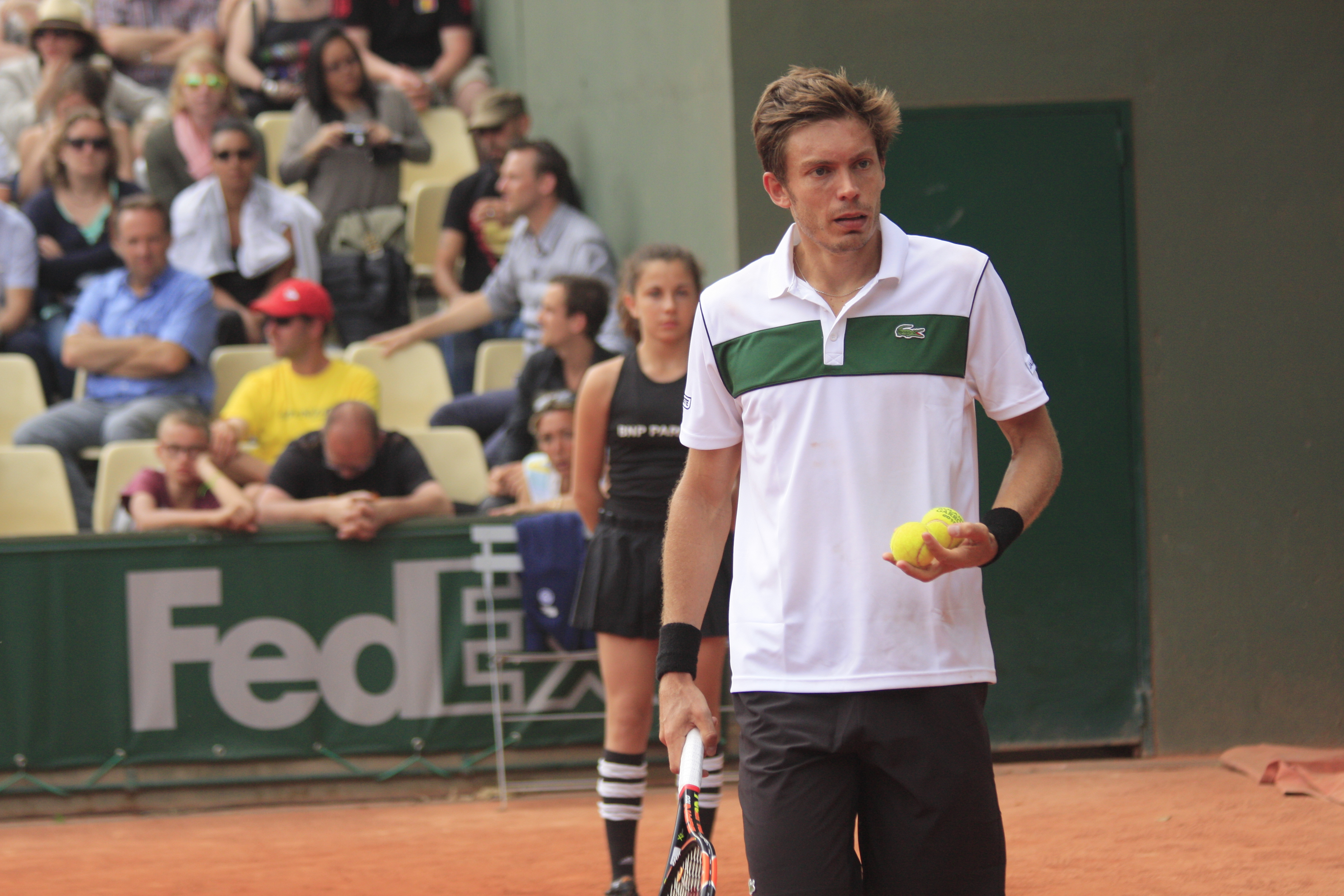
Mahut at the 2015 French Open.

Mahut then played a few qualifying matches for singles but failed to win any tour-level matches after qualifying for the main draw. He also competed in a few Challengers in both singles and doubles. He won the St. Brieuc Challenger in singles during this time, defeating Yūichi Sugita in the final.

Mahut then participated at the French Open, in both singles and doubles. In singles, Mahut was given a wild card, and defeated the 24th seed Latvian Ernests Gulbis in the second round but lost to the 12th seed countryman Gilles Simon in the third round in 5 sets, after leading 2 sets to 1. In doubles, he and Herbert were seeded 14th, and reached the third round where they lost to 2nd seeds Vasek Pospisil and Jack Sock in 2 tiebreaks.

The week after, he competed in the Topshelf Open, during the first week of the grass season, in both singles and doubles. In singles, which he needed to qualify, Mahut won three consecutive qualifying matches to advance to the main draw. From there on, he defeated Lleyton Hewitt, 3rd seed and defending champion Roberto Bautista Agut, 6th seed Adrian Mannarino, wildcard Robin Haase, and 2nd seed David Goffin in the final to win his third ATP Tour singles title of his career, all of them on grass. In doubles, he and Herbert defeated 2nd seeds Daniel Nestor and Leander Paes in the quarterfinals and 3rd seeds Jamie Murray and John Peers both in straight sets before losing in the final.

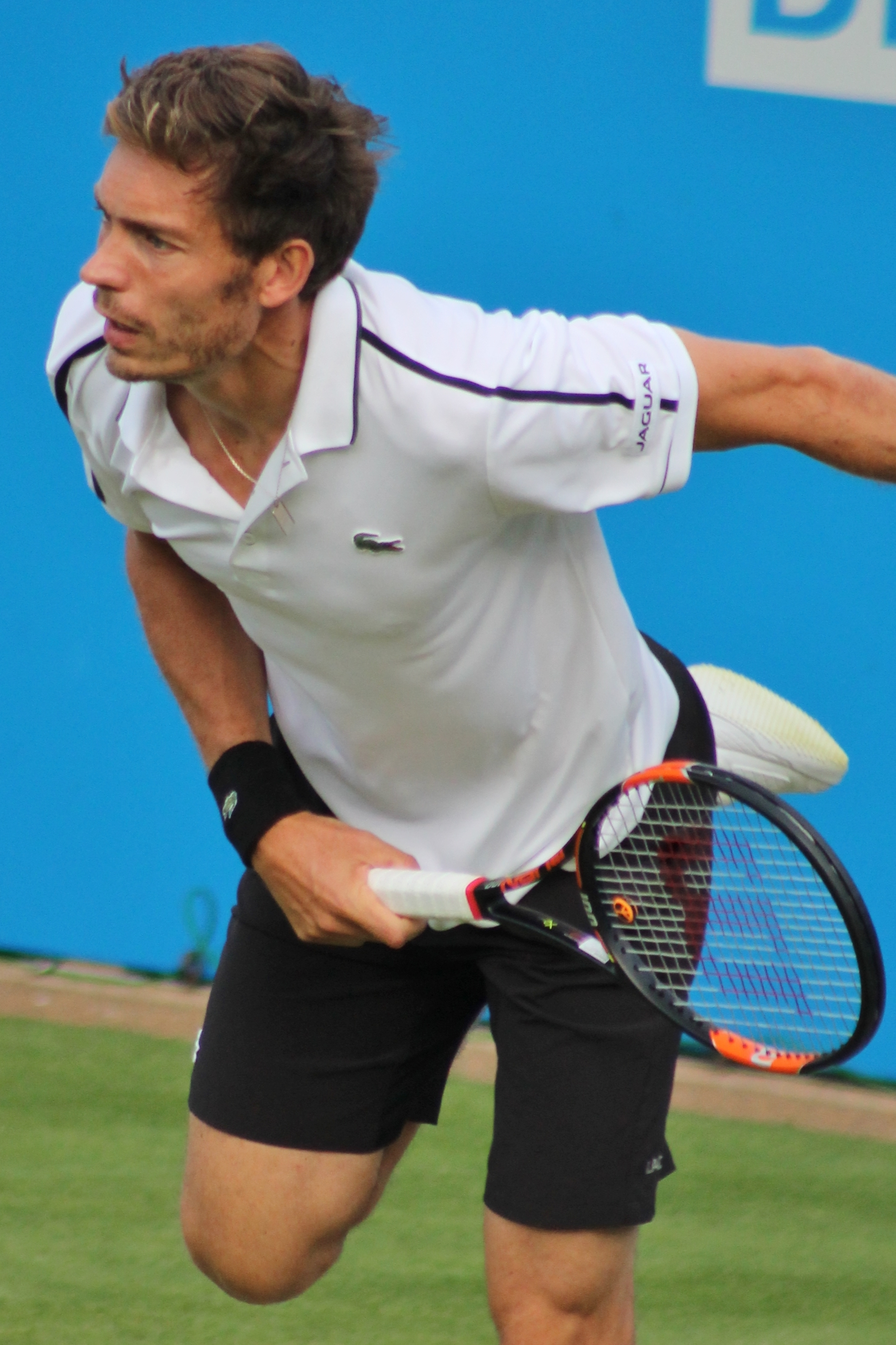
Mahut at the 2015 Queen's Club.

Mahut then participated in Queen's Club, in the doubles draw. He and Herbert were seeded 4th, and won the title without dropping a set, defeating 1st seeds Alexander Peya and Bruno Soares in the semifinals and 2nd seeds Marcin Matkowski and Nenad Zimonjić in the final.

At Wimbledon, Mahut participated in both singles and doubles draw. In singles, Mahut opened against Filip Krajinović and won in 4 sets. In the second round, he lost to 6th seed Tomáš Berdych in straight sets. In doubles, Mahut and Herbert were seeded 10th and reached the third round before Matkowski and Zimonjić avenged the loss earlier during the grass season.

After several uneventful weeks, where Mahut failed to win any tour-level matches in singles and only won 1 in doubles, Mahut competed in both singles and doubles at the US Open. In singles, he defeated American world No. 38 Sam Querrey in tight straight sets and lost the next round to 31st seed, Spaniard Guillermo García López in 4 sets. In doubles, Mahut and Herbert, seeded 12th, won the men's doubles title with a straight sets win over 8th seeds Jamie Murray and John Peers in the final while only dropping a tiebreaker en route to the title. They thus became the first all-French pair to win the men's doubles title at the US Open and their US Open victory marked the sixth time that an all-French pair had won a Grand Slam men's doubles title in the Open Era.

The next week Mahut participated at the Moselle Open, in singles and doubles. In singles, Mahut reached the quarterfinals with a 3 set win over 7th seed and countryman Mannarino en route, where he was defeated by another countryman, 3rd seed, and eventual champion Jo-Wilfried Tsonga. In doubles, he and Herbert were seeded 1st, and reached the finals where they lost to 2nd seeds Łukasz Kubot and Édouard Roger-Vasselin in 3 sets.

Mahut did not win a singles tour-level match for the remainder of the season.

Mahut and Herbert also qualified for the prestigious ATP World Tour Finals for the first time for both men, and were seeded 6th, but failed to advance past round robin stage after winning 1 of the 3 round robin matches.

=== 2016: Wimbledon doubles title and doubles world No. 1 ===
During the first few months of 2016, Mahut did one of his best performances in the start of the year. Reaching the quarterfinals in Sydney singles draws and Semis in Rotterdam, he enjoyed success in doubles. He won a doubles title in February 2016 in Rotterdam, an ATP World Tour 500 event, partnering Vasek Pospisil (and held 3 match points in the semifinal against eventual champion Martin Kližan in the singles draw, on what would have been his first tour-level final on hard court and his first final at an ATP World Tour 500 event), defeating Alexander Peya and Philipp Petzschner in the final. He and Pierre-Hugues Herbert then won the first three ATP World Tour Masters 1000 of the year: in Indian Wells, where he and Herbert defeated Pospisil and Jack Sock in straight sets in the final; in Miami, where he and Herbert defeated Raven Klaasen and Rajeev Ram in the final; and Monte Carlo, where he and Herbert defeated world No. 1 Jamie Murray and Bruno Soares in the final. By then, Mahut had won 17 consecutive matches in doubles (not including walkovers) which dated back to mid-February to Rotterdam. Unlike his ATP Tour singles titles, these came on hard and clay courts. He extended the streak to 19 when he reached the semifinals at the fourth Masters 1000 of the year at Madrid in May, succumbing to 3rd seeds, the No. 1 doubles team of 2015, and eventual champions Jean-Julien Rojer and Horia Tecău.

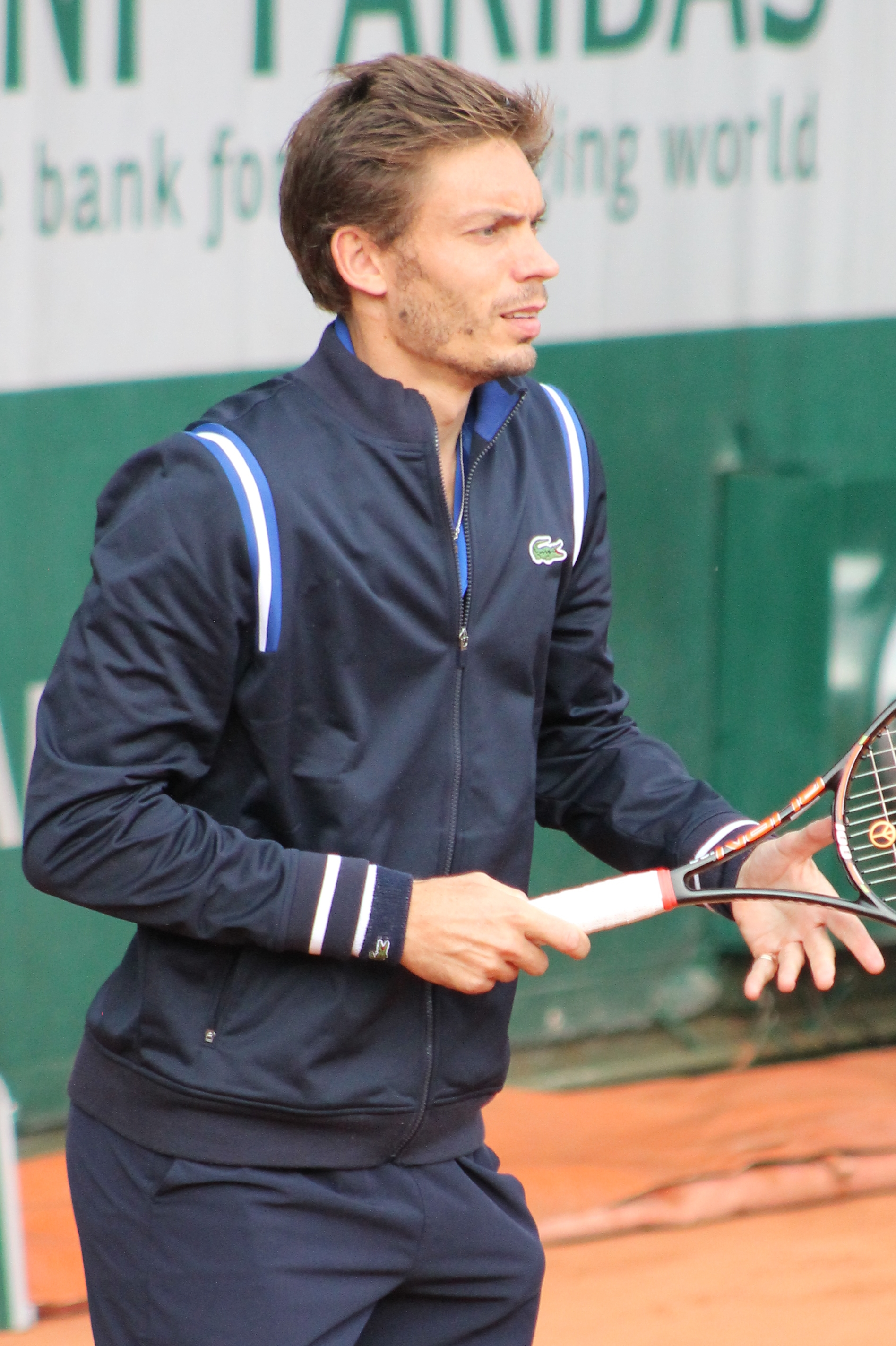
Mahut at the 2016 French Open.

At the French Open, in singles, unseeded Mahut defeated Lithuanian Ričardas Berankis in straight sets in the first round and reached the second round where he retired to Spaniard Marcel Granollers in the third set after trailing 0–2 in sets. In doubles, Mahut was seeded 1st in men's doubles in a Grand Slam event for the first time in his career. However, he and Herbert were upset in the third round by 15th seeds and eventual champions Feliciano López and Marc López. Despite the loss, on 6 June, Mahut became the 49th player and only the second Frenchman (the first was Yannick Noah, who held the No. 1 doubles ranking for a total of 19 weeks in 1986 and 1987) in history to be ranked No. 1 in the ATP Doubles Rankings. He held it for a week before losing it.

Mahut had an outstanding grass season, winning all tournaments he entered in either singles or doubles draw. By the end of the first week, on 13 June, Mahut already clinched his fourth ATP Tour singles title by successfully defending the Rosmalen Grass Court Championships singles title, and won it for a record-tying third time in men's singles, defeating Luxembourgian Gilles Müller in straight sets in the final. Mahut then participated in Queen's Club Championships in the second week, where he faced defending champion and world No. 2 Andy Murray in the opening round, and came close to repeating the success of 2012 by taking Murray to 2 tight tiebreaks, however he was unable to produce the same upset again. Despite the setback in singles, however, in the doubles draw, he and Herbert successfully defended the title while only dropping a tiebreak in the process, defeating Australian Chris Guccione and Brazilian André Sá in straight sets in the final, which was Mahut's 5th doubles title of the year. As a result, Mahut became the first, and the only player to date, to defend a title in both singles and doubles on the ATP World Tour since the new format started in 2009.

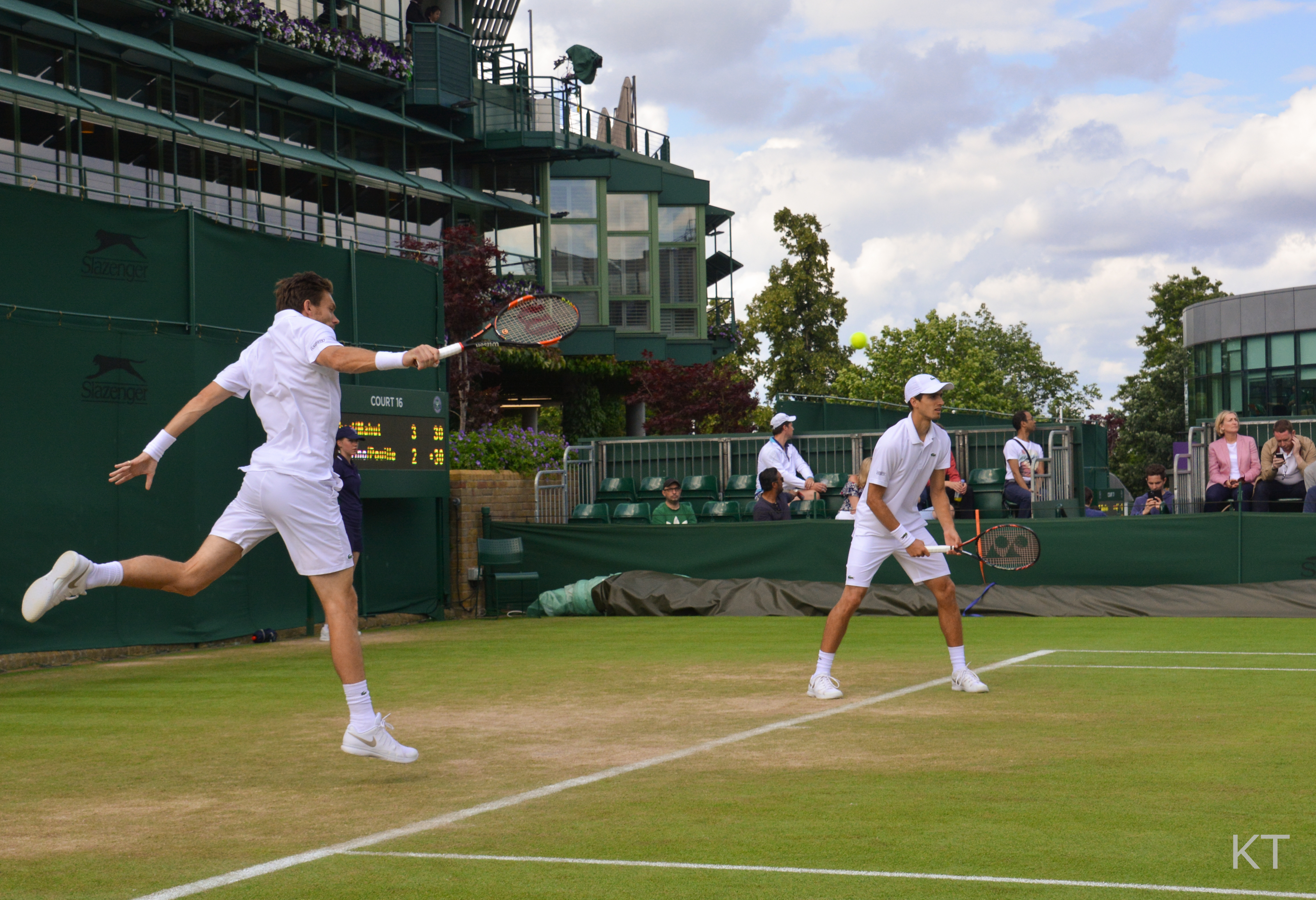
Mahut (left) and Herbert at the 2016 Wimbledon Championships

Mahut then competed at the Wimbledon Championships. In the singles draw, he defeated Brydan Klein in the first round in straight sets. He then upset 13th seed David Ferrer in the second round also in straight sets. In the third round he defeated his doubles partner Pierre-Hugues Herbert in four sets to advance to the singles fourth round of a Grand Slam event for the first time in his career. In the fourth round, he lost in straight sets to the 28th seed, Sam Querrey, who had unexpectedly defeated world No. 1 and top seed Novak Djokovic in the third round. In the doubles draw, again seeded 1st, he and Herbert fought their way to the final with a few tough matches en route, setting up a clash with unseeded pair of countrymen and friends Julien Benneteau and Édouard Roger-Vasselin, which is also the first ever all-French final in the history of Wimbledon. By reaching the final, Mahut has reached the men's doubles final of all four Grand Slams. He and Herbert defeated them in straight sets to win their 2nd Grand Slam men's doubles title. He also regained the No. 1 spot in doubles. He also tied with Novak Djokovic for most titles on the 2016 ATP Tour (7) to date with singles and doubles title combined, a feat Murray would later catch up to. He and Herbert also became the first pair to qualify for ATP World Tour Finals following results from Wimbledon. By then, Mahut and Herbert won another 10 consecutive doubles match that dates back to the Queen's Club championships, and extended it to 11 when they won their Davis Cup World Group quarterfinals rubber against Czech Republic. France eventually won 3–1. However, the streak came to a stop when they entered the Rio Olympics representing France and was taken out in the first round by unseeded Colombians Juan Sebastián Cabal and Robert Farah. Mahut later commented the result at Rio as "a failure, fiasco, and disaster".

After mediocre results in both singles and doubles at the Cincinnati Masters, the tournament he participated after the Olympics, Mahut competed in both singles and doubles draw at the US Open. In singles, Mahut was unseeded and defeated Philip Kolschreiber after winning the first 2 sets and Kolschreiber retired in the first round, and then he came up with another straight set victory against close friend and countryman Paul-Henri Mathieu. By reaching the third round, Mahut has now reached third round or better on all four Grand Slams in singles. It also marked the first time in his career that he participated in all four Grand Slams in singles without at least one first round exit. In the third round, he faced 6th seed Kei Nishikori and was off to a great start winning the first set, and had a lot more break point chances after the first set than Nishikori, but failed to convert any of them and lost the match while only winning 5 games in the last three sets. In doubles, as the defending champions, Mahut and Herbert was seeded 1st, and reached the semifinals for the second consecutive year and only dropped a set en route to set up a rematch of this year's Monte-Carlo Masters final against 4th seeds Jamie Murray and Bruno Soares, which they lost in 3 tight sets. Murray and Soares went on to win the tournament.

The week after US Open, Mahut participated in the Davis Cup World Group semifinals against Croatia. Mahut and Herbert teamed up for the doubles rubber, but were upset by Marin Čilić and Ivan Dodig in 4 closely contested sets. France went on to lose the tie by a margin of a match, 2–3. Mahut was then out of action for 4 weeks, including skipping the Shanghai Masters, where Bruno Soares was a match away from overtaking Mahut as the new world No. 1 in doubles. Had Soares won the match, he would have become the 50th player in history to be ranked No. 1 in the ATP Doubles Rankings. Mahut came back to play the inaugural European Open at Antwerp, Belgium, again in both singles and doubles draws. In singles, Mahut was seeded 7th, but was upset by unseeded eventual runner-up Argentine Diego Schwartzman in 2 tight sets in the first round. In doubles, seeded 1st, Mahut and Herbert reached the final, including a revenge against Schwartzman in the quarterfinals where he dropped the only set en route, in which they were taken out by 2nd seeds, Canadian Daniel Nestor and Frenchman Édouard Roger-Vasselin in straight sets. This marked Mahut's first loss in an ATP tour-level final, singles and doubles combined, in 2016.

Mahut then participated in the Swiss Indoors, another ATP World Tour 500 event, where he participated in both singles and doubles draw. In singles, he was unseeded and was defeated in the opening round by unseeded Italian Paolo Lorenzi. In doubles, he partnered Roger-Vasselin since Herbert did not compete this week and was seeded 2nd, and reached the semifinals without dropping a set where they lost in straight sets to the eventual champions and 4th seeds, Spaniard Marcel Granollers and American Jack Sock. The following week, Mahut will compete in the final tournament of the year, the Paris Masters, again in both singles and doubles draw. In singles, Mahut faced off against Martin Kližan in the first round, whom he faced earlier in the year, and avenged the loss by a 3 set win coming from a set down, and in the second round he was taken out by 8th seed David Goffin in straight sets. In doubles, Mahut and Herbert were seeded 1st and were the home favorites. After receiving a bye into the second round they cruised against João Sousa and Kližan, which was a double revenge in the same tournament. In the quarterfinals they faced 5th seeds, Spaniards Feliciano López and Marc López, who defeated Mahut and Herbert earlier this year in the third round of French Open on their opponents home soil. However, this time it is Mahut and Herbert who prevailed on home soil, in a close 3-set match. In the semifinals, the duo faced 8th seeds Rohan Bopanna and Daniel Nestor and again prevailed in a 3-set match to reach his second Paris Masters final. In the final, despite being the favorites on home soil, they lost to the unseeded pair Henri Kontinen and John Peers in another 3-set match.

Mahut and Herbert made their second straight ATP World Tour Finals appearance to wrap up the season, this time seeded 1st. He and Herbert were drawn into the Fleming/McEnroe Group with 4th seeds Feliciano López and Marc López, 5th seeds Henri Kontinen and John Peers, and 7th seeds Raven Klaasen and Rajeev Ram. Mahut only needed to win 1 round robin match to secure his year-end No. 1 ranking in doubles, and winning the Tour Finals with 2 round robin match wins or a spot in the final with 3 round robin match wins. The pair was upset by Klaasen and Ram in straight sets in the first match in a rematch of 2016 Miami Masters Men's Doubles final, and was 2 points away from winning the second match against López and López in the decider tiebreak in a rematch of 2016 Paris Masters Men's Doubles semifinals, therefore eliminated again at round robin stage. In the final round robin match, Mahut and Herbert lost to Kontinen and Peers again in a decider tiebreak after winning the first set in a rematch of 2016 Paris Masters Men's Doubles final, resulting a last place finish in their group and putting his year-end No. 1 ranking and No. 1 doubles team of 2016 in danger. In contrary, 2nd seeds Jamie Murray and Bruno Soares won all of their 3-round robin matches, and finished 25 points ahead of Mahut and Herbert for the No. 1 doubles team of 2016. However, Murray and Soares was upset by Klaasen and Ram in the semifinals in straight sets, and as a result Mahut was able to finish 2016 ranked No. 1 in doubles. In singles, Mahut also finished 2016 at a career-best year-end ranking of No. 39.

=== 2017: Davis Cup success, 3 Masters titles ===
Following on his stellar 2016 season in doubles, Mahut had a more difficult 2017 season, not progressing past the quarterfinal stage at any of the four Grand Slams events he participated in. He did, however, duplicate his doubles success of 2016 at the Masters series tournaments, reaching four finals again, and winning three of them. More importantly, he won all three of the doubles rubbers he played during France's successful Davis Cup campaign that ended with a 10th Davis Cup Trophy.

=== 2018: French Open doubles champion, ATP Finals runner up ===
Mahut and doubles partner Herbert became the third all-French pair in the open-era to claim the French Open title as they defeated Oliver Marach and Mate Pavić 6–2, 7–6^{(7–4)} in the final. In doing so Mahut recorded his 300th doubles win along the way.

At the ATP finals in their fourth attempt as a pair, Mahut and Herbert progressed past the round-robin stage of the tournament for the first time reaching the finals before being defeated by Jack Sock and Mike Bryan.

=== 2019: Career Grand Slam, ATP Finals winner ===
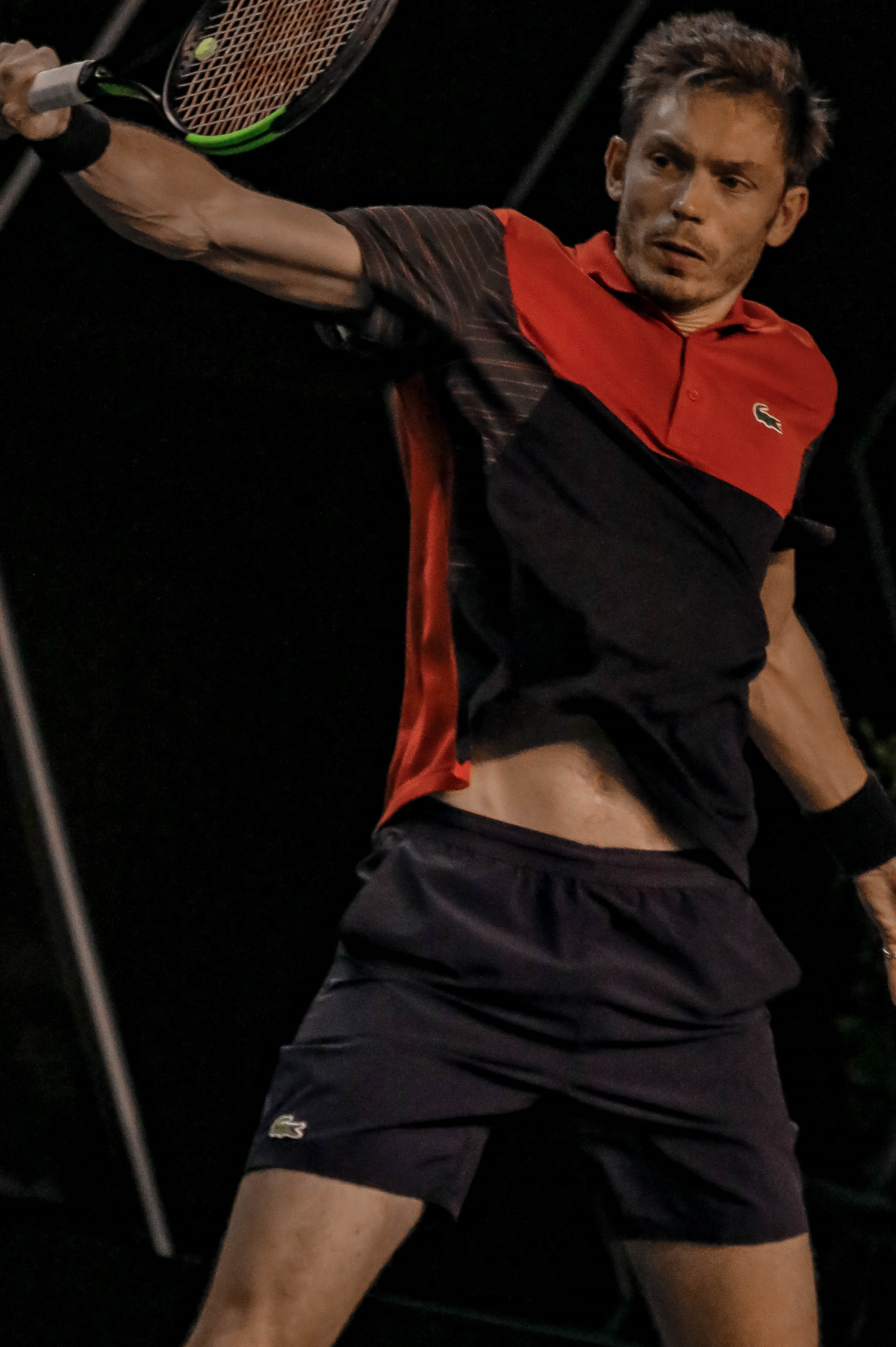
Mahut at the 2019 Rolex Paris Masters

In January, Mahut and doubles partner Herbert earned the Career Grand Slam in men's doubles after defeating Henri Kontinen and John Peers in the Australian Open final, 6–4, 7–6^{(7–1)}. In the singles at Roland Garros Mahut reached the third round beating former semifinalist Marco Cecchinato in the first round to do so.

Partnering with Édouard Roger-Vasselin Mahut reached the Wimbledon doubles final falling to Colombian duo Juan Sebastián Cabal and Robert Farah in five tight sets 7–6^{(7–5)}, 6–7^{(5–7)}, 6–7^{(6–8)}, 7–6^{(7–5)}, 3–6. The pair then claimed the ATP 500 title of Tokyo defeating Nikola Mektic and Franko Skugor 7–6(7), 6–4.

Mahut reunited with Pierre-Hugues Herbert to play the Paris Rolex Masters which they won defeating Karen Khachanov and Andrey Rublev 6–4, 6–1 in the final. The pair qualified for the ATP Finals for the 5th straight year. Mahut and Herbert went undefeated in the round robin stage, and then went on to lift the trophy, without dropping a set throughout the tournament. They defeated Raven Klaasen and Michael Venus in the final 6–3,6–4.

=== 2020: Three Titles ===
Mahut won two doubles titles with Herbert and one with Vasek Pospisil.

=== 2021: Four more titles including second French Open and ATP Finals titles ===
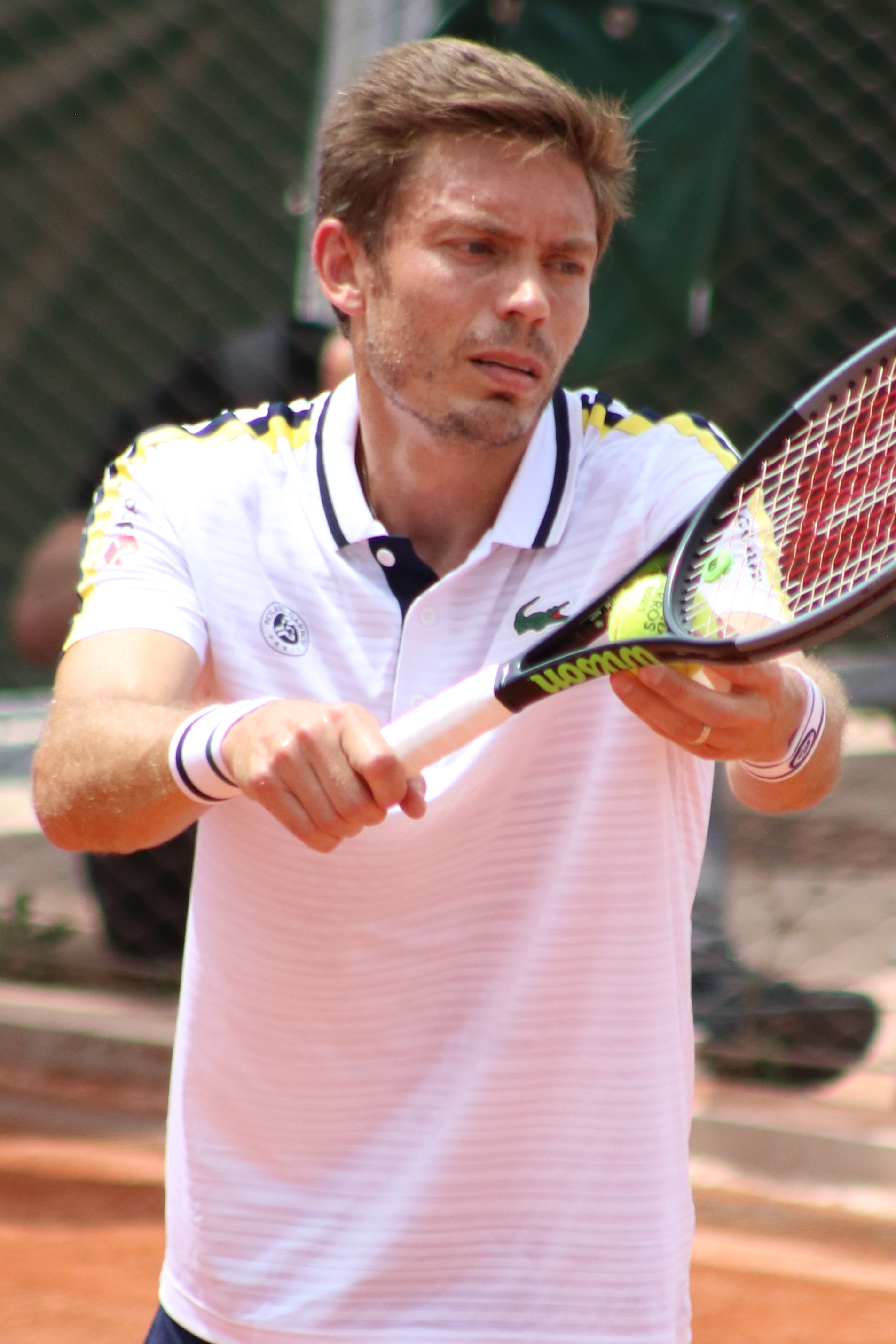
Mahut at the 2021 French Open

Mahut continued partnering with Pierre-Hugues Herbert to play at the 2021 French Open where the pair won it for the second time in their career beating Alexander Bublik and Andrey Golubev in the final. The home favorites saved three match points en route to the final defeating second seeds Juan Sebastián Cabal/Robert Farah. They then defeated Alexander Bublik and Andrey Golubev to claim their second French Open doubles title.

Mahut and Herbert continued their partnership at the 2021 Queen's Club Championships. They won the championships for the third time, beating Reilly Opelka and John Peers in straight sets. The pairing, however, had less success at the 2021 Wimbledon Championships – despite beating Facundo Bagnis and Albert Ramos Viñolas in the first round, Mahut and Herbert were forced to forfeit their second round match against Fabrice Martin and Jérémy Chardy, due to a thigh injury sustained by Herbert.

Mahut represented France at the Olympics. He entered the men's doubles, with Pierre-Hugues Herbert, and the mixed doubles, with Kristina Mladenovic. However, Mahut lost both of his first round matches in straight sets; losing to the British pair Andy Murray and Joe Salisbury in the men's doubles, and the Russian pair and eventual finalists Elena Vesnina and Aslan Karatsev in the mixed doubles.

After an unsatisfactory American hard court swing, Mahut played at the 2021 US Open with Pierre-Hugues Herbert, they reached the quarterfinals, after three wins. They lost to 8th seeds John Peers and Filip Polášek.

In October, Mahut paired up with fellow French player Fabrice Martin for the 2021 European Open. They won the title by beating the Dutch pair of Wesley Koolhof and Jean-Julien Rojer, for the loss of only one game.

Following that win, Mahut paired up Pierre-Hugues Herbert again, for the 2021 Rolex Paris Masters. After navigating through 3 matches, including the 6th seeds John Peers and Filip Polášek, they lost in the final against Tim Pütz and Michael Venus on a match tiebreak, 9–11.

Next, Mahut and Herbert played in the 2021 ATP Finals, as one of the eight best teams of the year. They navigated through the group stage, for the loss of only one match to Rajeev Ram and Joe Salisbury. In the semifinals, they beat Marcel Granollers and Horacio Zeballos to advance to their third ATP Finals final. In the final, they successfully avenged their loss to Ram and Salisbury in the group stage, winning in straight sets. This was their second title as a pair at the season ending finale.

=== 2022–25: 40th ATP title, retirement, coach and tournament director ===
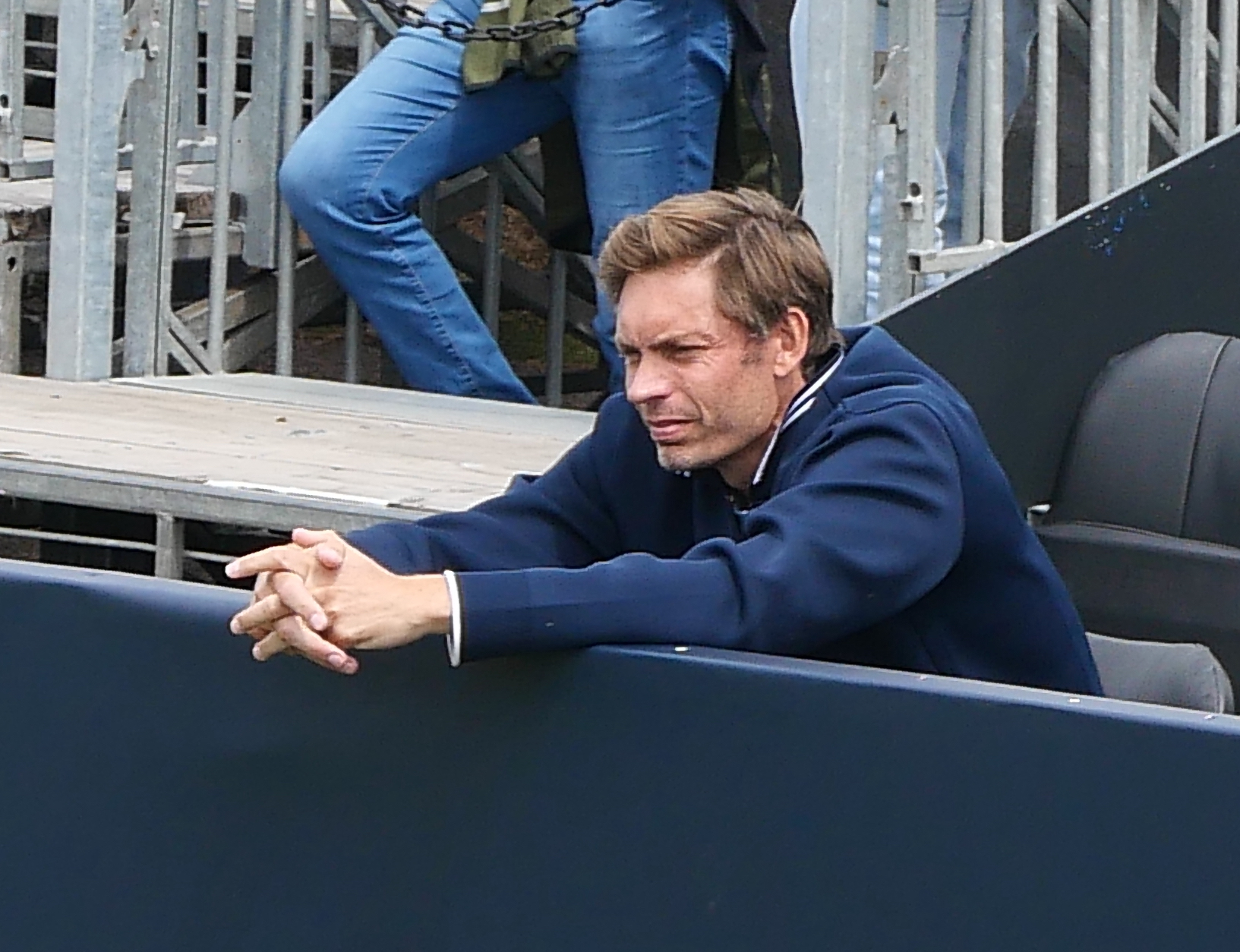
Mahut at the 2026 Libéma Open

At the 2022 Open Sud de France in February, he won his 40th title with partner Herbert as top seeds, defeating Lloyd Glasspool and Harri Heliövaara. It was their 21st title as a team.

At the 2025 French Open, Mahut announced his retirement for the end of the 2025 season. Mahut played his last professional match at the Rolex Paris Masters partnering Grigor Dimitrov.

He started coaching Benjamin Bonzi in 2025. Mahut also became the sports director of the Open Rennes Challenger.

== Playing style ==
Mahut is a solid baseliner who is also very adept at serve and volleying. He has an accurate first serve that puts his opponent out of position, and then comes to the net to finish the point, a tactic he often employs on grass. On a second serve or on other surfaces, Mahut engages more frequently in baseline rallies and attacks the net whenever he sees a chance. He has consistent and accurate strokes off both wings, and he is also capable of hitting winners from both wings with a combination of speed and angle.

== Longest match in history ==
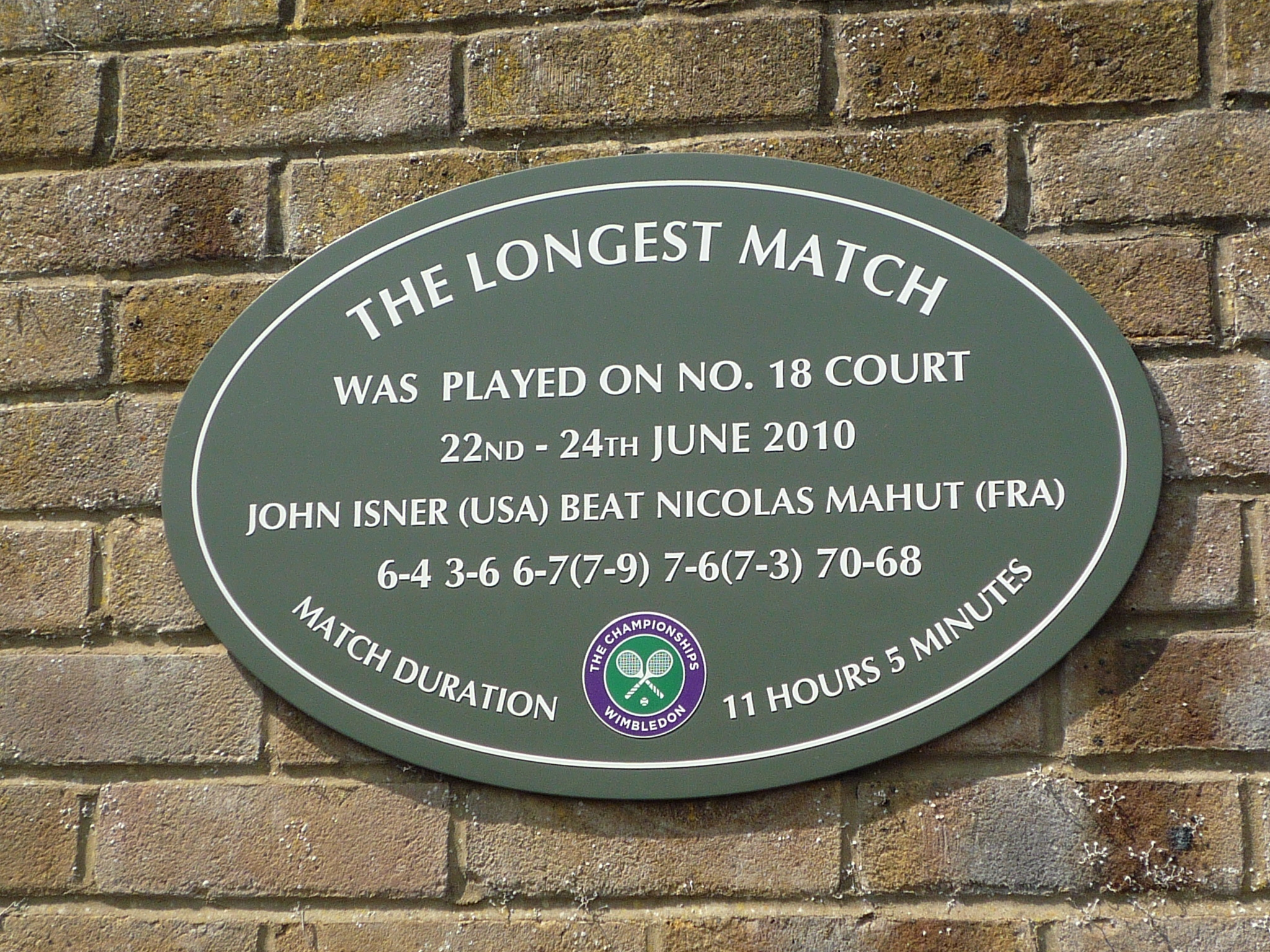
The plaque on the wall of Court 18 at Wimbledon that commemorates the match

In what became a record-setting match, spanning three days, qualifier Mahut faced 23rd seed John Isner in the first round of the 2010 Wimbledon Championships on 22–24 June. Isner served a world record 113 aces in the single match alone, breaking Ivo Karlović's record of 78. Mahut would go on to surpass it as well with 103. Play was suspended at 21:11 on 23 June due to darkness at a score of 59–59. Isner eventually took the match the following day, winning 6–4, 3–6, 6–7^{(7–9)}, 7–6^{(7–3)}, 70–68. Isner was not able to win his next match and had to drop out of the doubles portion due to fatigue.

The match is the longest match ever in a Tennis Open in terms of both time and number of games, lasting a total of 183 games, and a total of 11 hours and 5 minutes in duration; it beat, respectively, the Pancho Gonzales – Charlie Pasarell record of 112 games in the first round of Wimbledon in 1969, and the Fabrice Santoro – Arnaud Clément record of 6 hours, 33 minutes at the 2004 French Open.

Both players and the referee later received commemorative prizes for participating in the match. Mahut holds the record for most points won in a tennis match, at 502 points. He also holds the Wimbledon record for most games won in a match by a losing player with 91.

== Career statistics ==
Key
W	F	SF	QF	#R	RR	Q#	DNQ	A	NH

(W) winner; (F) finalist; (SF) semifinalist; (QF) quarterfinalist; (#R) rounds 4, 3, 2, 1; (RR) round-robin stage; (Q#) qualification round; (DNQ) did not qualify; (A) absent; (NH) not held; (SR) strike rate (events won / competed); (W–L) win–loss record.
To avoid confusion and double counting, these charts are updated at the conclusion of a tournament or when the player's participation has ended.

=== Grand Slam singles performance timeline ===
Tournament	2000	2001	2002	2003	2004	2005	2006	2007	2008	2009	2010	2011	2012	2013	2014	2015	2016	2017	2018	2019	2020	SR	W–L	Win %
Grand Slam tournaments
Australian Open	A	1R	A	A	1R	A	A	2R	2R	A	A	2R	3R	A	1R	Q1	2R	1R	Q1	Q1	Q1	0 / 9	6–9	40%
French Open	1R	1R	A	1R	1R	A	1R	1R	1R	Q2	2R	1R	3R	1R	1R	3R	2R	1R	1R	3R	A	0 / 17	8–17	32%
Wimbledon	A	A	A	A	A	A	3R	2R	1R	1R	1R	1R	2R	2R	1R	2R	4R	1R	Q2	Q1	NH	0 / 12	9–12	43%
US Open	A	A	A	1R	1R	A	2R	1R	1R	Q1	Q3	2R	1R	1R	1R	2R	3R	3R	2R	Q2	A	0 / 13	8–13	38%
Win–loss	0–1	0–2	0–0	0–2	0–3	0–0	3–3	2–4	1–4	0–1	1–2	2–4	5–4	1–3	0–4	4–3	7–4	2–4	1–2	2–1	0–0	0 / 51	31–51	38%

=== Grand Slam doubles performance timeline ===
Tournament	2000	2001	2002	2003	2004	2005	2006	2007	2008	2009	2010	2011	2012	2013	2014	2015	2016	2017	2018	2019	2020	2021	2022	2023	2024	2025	SR	W–L	Win %
Grand Slam tournaments
Australian Open	A	A	A	A	3R	2R	1R	QF	3R	A	A	A	1R	1R	SF	F	2R	QF	2R	W	1R	QF	1R	1R	2R	A	1 / 18	32–17	65%
French Open	2R	1R	1R	2R	1R	1R	QF	2R	A	3R	1R	3R	2R	F	3R	3R	3R	1R	W	2R	3R	W	1R	1R	1R	1R	2 / 25	37–23	62%
Wimbledon	A	A	A	A	2R	1R	1R	1R	3R	A	1R	2R	1R	2R	SF	3R	W	2R	2R	F	NH	2R	QF	2R	2R	1R	1 / 20	29–18	62%
US Open	A	A	A	A	SF	QF	1R	SF	2R	1R	1R	A	QF	3R	2R	W	SF	1R	3R	1R	1R	QF	1R	SF	A	1R	1 / 20	37–18	67%
Win–loss	1–1	0–1	0–1	1–1	7–4	4–4	3–4	8–4	5–3	2–2	0–3	3–2	4–4	8–4	11–3	15–3	13–3	4–4	10–3	12–3	2–3	13–3	2–4	5–4	2–2	0–3	5 / 83	135–76	64%

== Significant finals ==
=== Grand Slam finals ===
==== Doubles: 8 (5 titles, 3 runner-up) ====
Result	Year	Championship	Surface	Partner	Opponents	Score
Loss	2013	French Open	Clay	(France) Michaël Llodra	(United States) Bob Bryan (United States) Mike Bryan	4–6, 6–4, 6–7^{(3–7)}
Loss	2015	Australian Open	Hard	(France) Pierre-Hugues Herbert	(Italy) Simone Bolelli (Italy) Fabio Fognini	4–6, 4–6
Win	2015	US Open	Hard	(France) Pierre-Hugues Herbert	(United Kingdom) Jamie Murray (Australia) John Peers	6–4, 6–4
Win	2016	Wimbledon	Grass	(France) Pierre-Hugues Herbert	(France) Julien Benneteau (France) Édouard Roger-Vasselin	6–4, 7–6^{(7–1)}, 6–3
Win	2018	French Open	Clay	(France) Pierre-Hugues Herbert	(Austria) Oliver Marach (Croatia) Mate Pavić	6–2, 7–6^{(7–4)}
Win	2019	Australian Open	Hard	(France) Pierre-Hugues Herbert	(Finland) Henri Kontinen (Australia) John Peers	6–4, 7–6^{(7–1)}
Loss	2019	Wimbledon	Grass	(France) Édouard Roger-Vasselin	(Colombia) Juan Sebastián Cabal (Colombia) Robert Farah	7–6^{(7–5)}, 6–7^{(5–7)}, 6–7^{(6–8)}, 7–6^{(7–5)}, 3–6
Win	2021	French Open (2)	Clay	(France) Pierre-Hugues Herbert	(Kazakhstan) Alexander Bublik (Kazakhstan) Andrey Golubev	4–6, 7–6^{(7–1)}, 6–4

=== Year-end championships ===
==== Doubles: 3 (2 titles, 1 runner-up) ====
Result	Year	Championship	Surface	Partner	Opponents	Score
Loss	2018	ATP Finals, London	Hard (i)	(France) Pierre-Hugues Herbert	(United States) Mike Bryan (United States) Jack Sock	7–5, 1–6, [11–13]
Win	2019	ATP Finals, London	Hard (i)	(France) Pierre-Hugues Herbert	(South Africa) Raven Klaasen (New Zealand) Michael Venus	6–3, 6–4
Win	2021	ATP Finals, Turin (2)	Hard (i)	(France) Pierre-Hugues Herbert	(United States) Rajeev Ram (United Kingdom) Joe Salisbury	6–4, 7–6^{(7–0)}

=== Masters 1000 finals ===
==== Doubles: 12 (7 titles, 5 runner-ups) ====
Result	Year	Tournament	Surface	Partner	Opponents	Score
Loss	2011	Paris Masters	Hard (i)	(France) Julien Benneteau	(India) Rohan Bopanna (Pakistan) Aisam-ul-Haq Qureshi	2–6, 4–6
Win	2016	Indian Wells Masters	Hard	(France) Pierre-Hugues Herbert	(Canada) Vasek Pospisil (United States) Jack Sock	6–3, 7–6^{(7–5)}
Win	2016	Miami Open	Hard	(France) Pierre-Hugues Herbert	(South Africa) Raven Klaasen (United States) Rajeev Ram	5–7, 6–1, [10–7]
Win	2016	Monte-Carlo Masters	Clay	(France) Pierre-Hugues Herbert	(United Kingdom) Jamie Murray (Brazil) Bruno Soares	4–6, 6–0, [10–6]
Loss	2016	Paris Masters	Hard (i)	(France) Pierre-Hugues Herbert	(Finland) Henri Kontinen (Australia) John Peers	4–6, 6–3, [6–10]
Loss	2017	Madrid Open	Clay	(France) Édouard Roger-Vasselin	(Poland) Łukasz Kubot (Brazil) Marcelo Melo	5–7, 3–6
Win	2017	Italian Open	Clay	(France) Pierre-Hugues Herbert	(Croatia) Ivan Dodig (Spain) Marcel Granollers	4–6, 6–4, [10–3]
Win	2017	Canadian Open	Hard	(France) Pierre-Hugues Herbert	(India) Rohan Bopanna (Croatia) Ivan Dodig	6–4, 3–6, [10–6]
Win	2017	Cincinnati Masters	Hard	(France) Pierre-Hugues Herbert	(United Kingdom) Jamie Murray (Brazil) Bruno Soares	7–6^{(8–6)}, 6–4
Win	2019	Paris Masters	Hard (i)	(France) Pierre-Hugues Herbert	(Russia) Karen Khachanov (Russia) Andrey Rublev	6–4, 6–1
Loss	2021	Paris Masters	Hard (i)	(France) Pierre-Hugues Herbert	(Germany) Tim Pütz (New Zealand) Michael Venus	3–6, 7–6^{(7–4)}, [9–11]
Loss	2023	Miami Open	Hard	(United States) Austin Krajicek	(Mexico) Santiago González (France) Édouard Roger-Vasselin	6–7^{(4–7)}, 5–7
