= 1988 Hall of Fame Tennis Championships – Singles =

Singles
- 1988 Hall of Fame Tennis Championships and the Virginia Slims of Newport

Final
- Champion: (Australia) Wally Masur
- Runner-up: (Australia) Brad Drewett
- Score: 6–2, 6–1

Details
- Draw: 32 (3WC/4Q/2LL)
- Seeds: 8

Events
Singles	men	women
Doubles	men	women
← 1987 ·	Hall of Fame Tennis Championships	· 1989 →
← 1987 ·	Virginia Slims of Newport	· 1989 →

Dan Goldie was the defending champion, but lost in the second round to Mike Lee.

Wally Masur won the title by defeating Brad Drewett 6–2, 6–1 in the final.

== Seeds ==
1. (United States) Dan Goldie (second round)
2. (Sweden) Peter Lundgren (quarterfinals)
3. (United States) Paul Annacone (quarterfinals)
4. (Australia) Wally Masur (champion)
5. (New Zealand) Kelly Evernden (quarterfinals)
6. (United States) Sammy Giammalva Jr. (second round)
7. (United States) Matt Anger (first round)
8. (United States) Derrick Rostagno (second round)

== Draw ==
=== Key ===
- Q = Qualifier
- WC = Wild card
- LL = Lucky loser
- Alt = Alternate
- SE = Special exempt
- PR = Protected ranking
- ITF = ITF entry
- JE = Junior exempt
- w/o = Walkover
- r = Retired
- d = Defaulted
- SR = Special ranking

=== Finals ===
Semifinals
(Australia) Brad Drewett	7	6
(South Africa) Pieter Aldrich	6	4
4	(Australia) Wally Masur	7	7
(India) Vijay Amritraj	6	6

Final
(Australia) Brad Drewett	2	1
4	(Australia) Wally Masur	6	6

=== Top half ===
First round
1	(United States) D Goldie	6	6
(South Africa) G Muller	2	4
Q	(United States) S DeVries	6	6	6
Q	(United States) M Lee	7	3	7
(Australia) B Drewett	4	7	7
LL	(United States) R Matuszewski	6	6	6
(The Bahamas) R Smith	5	6	6
7	(United States) M Anger	7	4	4
3	(United States) P Annacone	6	6
(United States) B Scanlon	3	1
(United States) P Chamberlin	6	7
(New Zealand) D Lewis	4	6
(United States) S Davis	2	5
(South Africa) P Aldrich	6	7
WC	(United States) D Wheaton	2	2
6	(United States) S Giammalva Jr.	6	6

Second round
1	(United States) D Goldie	6	6	6
Q	(United States) M Lee	4	7	7
(Australia) B Drewett	6	1	6
(The Bahamas) R Smith	2	6	3
3	(United States) P Annacone	w/o
(United States) P Chamberlin
(South Africa) P Aldrich	6	3	6
6	(United States) S Giammalva Jr.	4	6	3

Quarterfinals
Q	(United States) M Lee	4	1
(Australia) B Drewett	6	6
3	(United States) P Annacone	6	1	6
(South Africa) P Aldrich	4	6	7

Semifinals
(Australia) B Drewett	7	6
(South Africa) P Aldrich	6	4

=== Bottom half ===
First round
5	(New Zealand) K Evernden	6	7
Q	(United States) B Garnett	3	6
(Kenya) P Wekesa	6	3
WC	(United States) G Layendecker	7	6
(South Africa) D Visser	6	6
WC	(United States) B Garrow	4	3
(United States) M Bauer	2	6
4	(Australia) W Masur	6	7
8	(United States) D Rostagno	6	6
Q	(United States) L Scott	3	2
(India) V Amritraj	6	6
(Australia) P Doohan	3	1
(United States) K Jones	6	6
LL	(United Kingdom) Chris Louw	3	4
(United States) M Flur	2	2
2	(Sweden) P Lundgren	6	6

Second round
5	(New Zealand) K Evernden	2	7	7
WC	(United States) G Layendecker	6	6	5
(South Africa) D Visser	5	1
4	(Australia) W Masur	7	6
8	(United States) D Rostagno	6	6
(India) V Amritraj	7	7
(United States) K Jones	3	2
2	(Sweden) P Lundgren	6	6

Quarterfinals
5	(New Zealand) K Evernden	6	0
4	(Australia) W Masur	7	6
(India) V Amritraj	6	4	6
2	(Sweden) P Lundgren	3	6	2

Semifinals
4	(Australia) W Masur	7	7
(India) V Amritraj	6	6
