= 1988 Hall of Fame Tennis Championships – Doubles =

Doubles
- 1988 Hall of Fame Tennis Championships and the Virginia Slims of Newport

Final
- Champions: (United States) Kelly Jones (Sweden) Peter Lundgren
- Runners-up: (United States) Scott Davis (United States) Dan Goldie
- Score: 6–3, 7–6

Details
- Draw: 16 (1WC)
- Seeds: 4

Events
Singles	men	women
Doubles	men	women
← 1987 ·	Hall of Fame Tennis Championships	· 1989 →
← 1987 ·	Virginia Slims of Newport	· 1989 →

Dan Goldie and Larry Scott were the defending champions, but Scott did not compete this year.

Goldie teamed up with Scott Davis and lost in the final to Kelly Jones and Peter Lundgren. The score was 6–3, 7–6.

== Seeds ==
1. (Australia) Brad Drewett / (Australia) Wally Masur (quarterfinals)
2. (South Africa) Pieter Aldrich / (South Africa) Danie Visser (semifinals)
3. (United States) Kelly Jones / (Sweden) Peter Lundgren (champions)
4. (United States) Scott Davis / (United States) Dan Goldie (final)

== Draw ==
=== Key ===
- Q = Qualifier
- WC = Wild card
- LL = Lucky loser
- Alt = Alternate
- ITF = ITF entry
- PR = Protected ranking
- SR = Special ranking
- SE = Special exempt
- JE = Junior exempt
- JR = Junior Accelerator Programme entrant
- CO = College Accelerator Programme entrant
- NG = Next Gen Accelerator Program entrant
- w/o = Walkover
- r = Retired
- d = Defaulted

=== Draw ===
First round
1	(Australia) B Drewett (Australia) W Masur	6	6
(United States) M Bauer (United States) G Layendecker	4	4
(New Zealand) D Lewis (United States) B Scanlon	3	6	3
(United States) S DeVries (United States) R Matuszewski	6	3	6
4	(United States) S Davis (United States) D Goldie	7	7
(United States) K Lubbers (United States) Jim Sommerville	6	6
(United States) Eddie Stewart (United States) F Viancos	6	7
(United States) M Lee (United States) Henry Somerville	3	6
(United States) Mike Conroy (United Kingdom) Chris Louw	3	2
WC	(United States) B Garrow (United States) D Wheaton	6	6
(United States) M Anger (New Zealand) K Evernden	6	6	6
3	(United States) K Jones (Sweden) P Lundgren	7	4	7
(The Bahamas) R Smith (Kenya) P Wekesa	6	6
(United States) J DeFoor (United States) C Kennedy	3	4
(United States) M Flur (United States) S Giammalva Jr.	2	6	6
2	(South Africa) P Aldrich (South Africa) D Visser	6	4	7

Quarterfinals
1	(Australia) B Drewett (Australia) W Masur	4	6
(United States) S DeVries (United States) R Matuszewski	6	7
4	(United States) S Davis (United States) D Goldie	6	6
(United States) Eddie Stewart (United States) F Viancos	4	4
WC	(United States) B Garrow (United States) D Wheaton	4	4
3	(United States) K Jones (Sweden) P Lundgren	6	6
(The Bahamas) R Smith (Kenya) P Wekesa	6	4	5
2	(South Africa) P Aldrich (South Africa) D Visser	4	6	7

Semifinals
(United States) S DeVries (United States) R Matuszewski	4	7	4
4	(United States) S Davis (United States) D Goldie	6	5	6
3	(United States) K Jones (Sweden) P Lundgren	6	3	7
2	(South Africa) P Aldrich (South Africa) D Visser	3	6	6

Final
4	(United States) S Davis (United States) D Goldie	3	6
3	(United States) K Jones (Sweden) P Lundgren	6	7
