= 1988 Virginia Slims of Newport – Doubles =

Doubles
- 1988 Hall of Fame Tennis Championships and the Virginia Slims of Newport
- 1987 Champions: (United States) Gigi Fernández (United States) Lori McNeil

Final
- Champions: (South Africa) Rosalyn Fairbank (United States) Barbara Potter
- Runners-up: (United States) Gigi Fernández (United States) Lori McNeil
- Score: 6–4, 6–3

Events
Singles	men	women
Doubles	men	women
← 1987 ·	Hall of Fame Tennis Championships	· 1989 →
← 1987 ·	Virginia Slims of Newport	· 1989 →

Gigi Fernández and Lori McNeil were the defending champions but lost in the final 6–4, 6–3 against Rosalyn Fairbank and Barbara Potter.

== Seeds ==
Champion seeds are indicated in bold text while text in italics indicates the round in which those seeds were eliminated.

1. (United States) Gigi Fernández / (United States) Lori McNeil (final)
2. (South Africa) **Rosalyn Fairbank** / (United States) **Barbara Potter (champions)**
3. (United States) Katrina Adams / (Netherlands) Carin Bakkum (semifinals)
4. (United States) Gretchen Magers / (United States) Wendy White (quarterfinals)

== Draw ==
=== Key ===
- Q = Qualifier
- WC = Wild card
- LL = Lucky loser
- Alt = Alternate
- SE = Special exempt
- PR = Protected ranking
- ITF = ITF entry
- JE = Junior exempt
- w/o = Walkover
- r = Retired
- d = Defaulted
- SR = Special ranking

First round
1	(United States) **G Fernández** (United States) **L McNeil**	**6**	**7**
(United States) L Bartlett (United States) J Thomas	2	6
(United States) A M Fernandez (United States) A Henricksson	4	1
(United States) **L Antonoplis** (United States) **C MacGregor**	**6**	**6**
4	(United States) **G Magers** (United States) **W White**	**6**	**6**
(United States) J Kaplan (United Kingdom) J Salmon	2	4
(Australia) M Jaggard (New Zealand) J Richardson	**7**	2	3
(United States) **A Smith** (Australia) **W Turnbull**	6	**6**	**6**
(Australia) K Staunton (Australia) C Thompson	0	0
(Australia) **A Scott** (United States) **W Wood**	**6**	**6**
(South Africa) L Gregory (United States) P Smith	0	5
3	(United States) **K Adams** (Netherlands) **C Bakkum**	**6**	**7**
(United States) **J Smoller** (United States) **K Steinmetz**	**6**	**6**
(United States) D-A Hansel (Brazil) T Zambrzycki	1	1
(United States) L Albano (United States) J Ingram	3	6
2	(South Africa) **R Fairbank** (United States) **B Potter**	**6**	**7**

Quarterfinals
1	(United States) **G Fernández** (United States) **L McNeil**	**6**	5	**6**
(United States) L Antonoplis (United States) C MacGregor	1	**7**	3
4	(United States) G Magers (United States) W White	4	2
(United States) **A Smith** (Australia) **W Turnbull**	**6**	**6**
(Australia) A Scott (United States) W Wood	3	6
3	(United States) **K Adams** (Netherlands) **C Bakkum**	**6**	**7**
(United States) J Smoller (United States) K Steinmetz	3	4
2	(South Africa) **R Fairbank** (United States) **B Potter**	**6**	**6**

Semifinals
1	(United States) **G Fernández** (United States) **L McNeil**	**6**	**7**
(United States) A Smith (Australia) W Turnbull	3	5
3	(United States) K Adams (Netherlands) C Bakkum	3	2
2	(South Africa) **R Fairbank** (United States) **B Potter**	**6**	**6**

Final
1	(United States) Gigi Fernández (United States) Lori McNeil	4	3
2	(South Africa) **Rosalyn Fairbank** (United States) **Barbara Potter**	**6**	**6**
