= 1988 Virginia Slims of Newport – Singles =

Singles
- 1988 Hall of Fame Tennis Championships and the Virginia Slims of Newport
- 1987 Champion: (United States) Pam Shriver

Final
- Champion: (United States) Lori McNeil
- Runner-up: (United States) Barbara Potter
- Score: 6–4, 4–6, 6–3

Details
- Draw: 32
- Seeds: 8

Events
Singles	men	women
Doubles	men	women
← 1987 ·	Hall of Fame Tennis Championships	· 1989 →
← 1987 ·	Virginia Slims of Newport	· 1989 →

Pam Shriver was the defending champion but lost in the semifinals to Barbara Potter.

Second-seeded Lori McNeil won in the final 6–4, 4–6, 6–3 against Potter.

== Seeds ==
A champion seed is indicated in bold text while text in italics indicates the round in which that seed was eliminated.

1. (United States) Pam Shriver (semifinals)
2. (United States) **Lori McNeil (champion)**
3. (United States) Barbara Potter (final)
4. (South Africa) Rosalyn Fairbank (semifinals)
5. (United States) Robin White (quarterfinals)
6. (United States) Gigi Fernández (second round)
7. (United States) Gretchen Magers (second round)
8. (Australia) Wendy Turnbull (first round)

== Draw ==
=== Key ===
- Q = Qualifier
- WC = Wild card
- LL = Lucky loser
- Alt = Alternate
- SE = Special exempt
- PR = Protected ranking
- ITF = ITF entry
- JE = Junior exempt
- w/o = Walkover
- r = Retired
- d = Defaulted
- SR = Special ranking

First round
1	(United States) **P Shriver**	**7**	**6**
(United States) T Phelps	5	1
(United States) T Mochizuki	5	2
Q	(United States) **K Steinmetz**	**7**	**6**
(United States) **C Christian**	5	**6**	**6**
Q	(United States) J Santrock	**7**	3	2
(United States) **W White**	**6**	**6**
8	(Australia) W Turnbull	2	4
3	(United States) **B Potter**	**7**	**7**
(United States) B Nagelsen	6	5
Q	(Australia) **A Scott**	**6**	**7**
(United States) J Ingram	2	5
(United States) **D-A Hansel**	3	**6**	**6**
(United States) P Casale	**6**	4	4
(Peru) P Vásquez	3	3
5	(United States) **R White**	**6**	**6**
7	(United States) **G Magers**	**6**	**6**
(United States) K Adams	3	2
(United States) **L Antonoplis**	**7**	**6**
Q	(United States) J Smoller	5	1
(Netherlands) C Bakkum	0	6
(New Zealand) **J Richardson**	**6**	**7**
(United States) A Smith	4	2
4	(South Africa) **R Fairbank**	**6**	**6**
6	(United States) **G Fernández**	**6**	**6**
(United States) A M Fernandez	2	3
(United States) **A Henricksson**	**6**	**6**
(United States) C MacGregor	3	1
(United States) L Albano	3	1
(United States) **A Frazier**	**6**	**6**
(Australia) M Jaggard	3	4
2	(United States) **L McNeil**	**6**	**6**

Second round
1	(United States) **P Shriver**	**6**	**6**
Q	(United States) K Steinmetz	2	3
(United States) C Christian	3	6
(United States) **W White**	**6**	**7**
3	(United States) **B Potter**	**6**	**6**
Q	(Australia) A Scott	1	4
(United States) D-A Hansel	2	0
5	(United States) **R White**	**6**	**6**
7	(United States) G Magers	4	**7**	3
(United States) **L Antonoplis**	**6**	6	**6**
(New Zealand) J Richardson	6	1
4	(South Africa) **R Fairbank**	**7**	**6**
6	(United States) G Fernández	**7**	4	5
(United States) **A Henricksson**	6	**6**	**7**
(United States) A Frazier	3	4
2	(United States) **L McNeil**	**6**	**6**

Quarterfinals
1	(United States) **P Shriver**	**6**	**6**
(United States) W White	4	4
3	(United States) **B Potter**	**6**	**6**
5	(United States) R White	3	3
(United States) L Antonoplis	2	1
4	(South Africa) **R Fairbank**	**6**	**6**
(United States) A Henricksson	**6**	5	3
2	(United States) **L McNeil**	4	**7**	**6**

Semifinals
1	(United States) P Shriver	6	6
3	(United States) **B Potter**	**7**	**7**
4	(South Africa) R Fairbank	**6**	5	3
2	(United States) **L McNeil**	3	**7**	**6**

Final
3	(United States) Barbara Potter	4	**6**	3
2	(United States) **Lori McNeil**	**6**	4	**6**
