= 1987 Hall of Fame Tennis Championships – Doubles =

Doubles
- 1987 Hall of Fame Tennis Championships

Final
- Champions: (United States) Dan Goldie (United States) Larry Scott
- Runners-up: (United States) Chip Hooper (United States) Mike Leach
- Score: 6–3, 4–6, 6–4

Details
- Draw: 14
- Seeds: 4

Events
Singles	Doubles
← 1986 ·	Hall of Fame Open	· 1988 →

Vijay Amritraj and Tim Wilkison were the defending champions, but none competed this year.

Dan Goldie and Larry Scott won the title by defeating Chip Hooper and Mike Leach 6–3, 4–6, 6–4 in the final.

== Seeds ==
The first two seeds received a bye to the second round.

1. (United States) Paul Annacone / (South Africa) Christo van Rensburg (quarterfinals)
2. (United States) Chip Hooper / (United States) Mike Leach (final)
3. (United States) Gary Donnelly / (United States) Ken Flach (semifinals)
4. (South Africa) Christo Steyn / (South Africa) Danie Visser (quarterfinals)

== Draw ==
=== Key ===
- Q = Qualifier
- WC = Wild card
- LL = Lucky loser
- Alt = Alternate
- ITF = ITF entry
- PR = Protected ranking
- SR = Special ranking
- SE = Special exempt
- JE = Junior exempt
- JR = Junior Accelerator Programme entrant
- CO = College Accelerator Programme entrant
- NG = Next Gen Accelerator Program entrant
- w/o = Walkover
- r = Retired
- d = Defaulted

=== Draw ===
First round
(United States) M Flur (United States) S Giammalva Jr.	6	3	6
(New Zealand) Paul Smith (The Bahamas) R Smith	0	6	2
4	(South Africa) C Steyn (South Africa) D Visser	7	6
(Austria) A Antonitsch (United States) M Bauer	6	3
(United States) G Holmes (United States) B Scanlon	4	5
(United States) D Goldie (United States) L Scott	6	7
(United States) Steve Griffon (United States) V Wilder	5	5
(United States) David Livingston (United States) J Rive	7	7
(Australia) B Drewett (Australia) W Masur	6	5	6
3	(United States) G Donnelly (United States) K Flach	3	7	7
(United States) G Layendecker (United States) T Witsken	3	7	7
(United States) S Davis (United States) D Pate	6	5	6

Quarterfinals
1	(United States) P Annacone (South Africa) C van Rensburg	2	4
(United States) M Flur (United States) S Giammalva Jr.	6	6
4	(South Africa) C Steyn (South Africa) D Visser	5	6
(United States) D Goldie (United States) L Scott	7	7
(United States) D Livingston (United States) J Rive	6	6
3	(United States) G Donnelly (United States) K Flach	7	7
(United States) G Layendecker (United States) T Witsken	6	6
2	(United States) C Hooper (United States) M Leach	7	7

Semifinals
(United States) M Flur (United States) S Giammalva Jr.	6	3	5
(United States) D Goldie (United States) L Scott	1	6	7
3	(United States) G Donnelly (United States) K Flach	6	6
2	(United States) C Hooper (United States) M Leach	7	7

Final
(United States) D Goldie (United States) L Scott	6	4	6
2	(United States) C Hooper (United States) M Leach	3	6	4
