= 1987 Hall of Fame Tennis Championships – Singles =

Singles
- 1987 Hall of Fame Tennis Championships

Final
- Champion: (United States) Dan Goldie
- Runner-up: (United States) Sammy Giammalva Jr.
- Score: 6–7^{(5–7)}, 6–4, 6–4

Details
- Draw: 32 (3WC/4Q)
- Seeds: 8

Events
Singles	Doubles
← 1986 ·	Hall of Fame Open	· 1988 →

Bill Scanlon was the defending champion, but lost in the first round to qualifier Marc Flur.

Dan Goldie won the title by defeating Sammy Giammalva Jr. 6–7^{(5–7)}, 6–4, 6–4 in the final.

== Seeds ==
1. (United States) David Pate (second round)
2. (United States) Scott Davis (first round)
3. (Australia) Wally Masur (semifinals)
4. (South Africa) Christo van Rensburg (semifinals)
5. (United States) Robert Seguso (first round)
6. (United States) Paul Annacone (second round)
7. (United States) Jim Grabb (first round)
8. (United States) Bill Scanlon (first round)

== Draw ==
=== Key ===
- Q = Qualifier
- WC = Wild card
- LL = Lucky loser
- Alt = Alternate
- ITF = ITF entry
- PR = Protected ranking
- SR = Special ranking
- SE = Special exempt
- JE = Junior exempt
- JR = Junior Accelerator Programme entrant
- CO = College Accelerator Programme entrant
- NG = Next Gen Accelerator Program entrant
- w/o = Walkover
- r = Retired
- d = Defaulted

=== Finals ===
Semifinals
(United States) Dan Goldie	6	4	6
3	(Australia) Wally Masur	2	6	2
4	(South Africa) Christo van Rensburg	3	1
(United States) Sammy Giammalva Jr.	6	6

Final
(United States) Dan Goldie	6^{5}	6	6
(United States) Sammy Giammalva Jr.	7^{7}	4	4

=== Top half ===
First round
1	(United States) D Pate	6	7
Q	(United States) C Hooper	3	6
(United States) D Goldie	7	7
WC	(United States) L Scott	6	6
(Australia) P Doohan	3	6	3
Q	(United States) M Bauer	6	3	6
Q	(United States) M Flur	1	6	6
8	(United States) B Scanlon	6	4	3
3	(Australia) W Masur	6	6
(United States) M Freeman	2	4
(United States) D Rostagno	4	6	4
(South Africa) D Visser	6	4	6
(Austria) A Antonitsch	7	1	6
(United States) G Holmes	6	6	7
(Australia) J Fitzgerald	6	6
5	(United States) R Seguso	1	1

Second round
1	(United States) D Pate	0	6	4
(United States) D Goldie	6	4	6
Q	(United States) M Bauer	5	4
Q	(United States) M Flur	7	6
3	(Australia) W Masur	7	6
(South Africa) D Visser	6	4
(United States) G Holmes	4	4
(Australia) J Fitzgerald	6	6

Quarterfinals
(United States) D Goldie	6	7
Q	(United States) M Flur	4	5
3	(Australia) W Masur	6	6
(Australia) J Fitzgerald	4	3

Semifinals
(United States) D Goldie	6	4	6
3	(Australia) W Masur	2	6	2

=== Bottom half ===
First round
6	(United States) P Annacone	7	6
(United States) G Donnelly	5	4
(United States) T Witsken	1	6
Q	(United States) J Rive	6	7
WC	(United States) V Wilder	6	7
(United States) J Sadri	3	6
(South Africa) C Steyn	3	6
4	(South Africa) C van Rensburg	6	7
7	(United States) J Grabb	3	4
(Australia) B Drewett	6	6
WC	(United States) K Flach	7	6
(United States) M Leach	6	0
(South Africa) E Edwards	6	7
(United States) G Layendecker	2	5
(United States) S Giammalva Jr.	6	6
2	(United States) S Davis	1	2

Second round
6	(United States) P Annacone	3	3
Q	(United States) J Rive	6	6
WC	(United States) V Wilder	2	4
4	(South Africa) C van Rensburg	6	6
(Australia) B Drewett	4	6	6
WC	(United States) K Flach	6	4	1
(South Africa) E Edwards	5	6	6
(United States) S Giammalva Jr.	7	0	7

Quarterfinals
Q	(United States) J Rive	6	3	4
4	(South Africa) C van Rensburg	2	6	6
(Australia) B Drewett	7	1	4
(United States) S Giammalva Jr.	6	6	6

Semifinals
4	(South Africa) C van Rensburg	3	1
(United States) S Giammalva Jr.	6	6
