= 1986 Virginia Slims of Newport – Doubles =

Doubles
- 1986 Virginia Slims of Newport

Final
- Champions: (United States) Terry Holladay (United States) Heather Ludloff
- Runners-up: (United States) Cammy MacGregor (United States) Gretchen Magers
- Score: 6–1, 6–7, 6–3

Details
- Draw: 16
- Seeds: 4

Events
Singles	Doubles
← 1985 ·	Virginia Slims of Newport	· 1987 →

Chris Evert Lloyd and Wendy Turnbull were the defending champions, but none competed this year.

Terry Holladay and Heather Ludloff won the title by defeating Cammy MacGregor and Gretchen Magers 6–1, 6–7, 6–3 in the final.

== Seeds ==
1. (United States) Gigi Fernández / (United States) Robin White (semifinals)
2. (Australia) Dianne Balestrat / (United States) Lori McNeil (first round)
3. (Argentina) Adriana Villagrán-Reami / (United States) Anne White (first round)
4. (Australia) Jenny Byrne / (South Africa) Jennifer Mundel (quarterfinals)

== Draw ==
=== Key ===
- Q = Qualifier
- WC = Wild card
- LL = Lucky loser
- Alt = Alternate
- SE = Special exempt
- PR = Protected ranking
- ITF = ITF entry
- JE = Junior exempt
- w/o = Walkover
- r = Retired
- d = Defaulted
- SR = Special ranking

=== Draw ===
First round
1	(United States) G Fernández (United States) R White	7	6
(United States) C Copeland-Wilson (United States) D Farrell	6	5
(United States) K Copeland (United States) D Hansel	3	3
(United States) AM Fernandez (Australia) L Field	6	6
4	(Australia) J Byrne (South Africa) J Mundel	6	6
(United States) L Allen (United States) JA Russell	0	4
(United States) T Holladay (United States) H Ludloff	6	2	7
(United States) L Antonoplis (Brazil) C Monteiro	2	6	6
(Australia) R Bryant (Australia) S Leo	3	6	6
(United States) Cy MacGregor (South Africa) E Reinach	6	2	1
(United States) H Crowe (United States) K Steinmetz	6	6
3	(Argentina) A Villagrán-Reami (United States) A White	3	2
(United States) R Blount (United States) S Rimes	2	2
(United States) Ca MacGregor (United States) G Magers	6	6
(United States) K McDaniel (United States) W Prausa	6	6
2	(Australia) D Balestrat (United States) L McNeil	2	2

Quarterfinals
1	(United States) G Fernández (United States) R White	3	6	6
(United States) AM Fernandez (Australia) L Field	6	3	4
4	(Australia) J Byrne (South Africa) J Mundel	4	6	5
(United States) T Holladay (United States) H Ludloff	6	3	7
(Australia) R Bryant (Australia) S Leo	6	6	6
(United States) H Crowe (United States) K Steinmetz	4	7	2
(United States) Ca MacGregor (United States) G Magers	6	3	6
(United States) K McDaniel (United States) W Prausa	3	6	3

Semifinals
1	(United States) G Fernández (United States) R White	6	3	4
(United States) T Holladay (United States) H Ludloff	3	6	6
(Australia) R Bryant (Australia) S Leo	2	7	4
(United States) Ca MacGregor (United States) G Magers	6	6	6

Final
(United States) T Holladay (United States) H Ludloff	6	6	6
(United States) Ca MacGregor (United States) G Magers	1	7	3
