= 1986 Virginia Slims of Newport – Singles =

Singles
- 1986 Virginia Slims of Newport

Final
- Champion: (United States) Pam Shriver
- Runner-up: (United States) Lori McNeil
- Score: 6–4, 6–2

Details
- Draw: 32 (3Q/1LL)
- Seeds: 8

Events
Singles	Doubles
← 1985 ·	Virginia Slims of Newport	· 1987 →

Chris Evert Lloyd was the defending champion, but did not compete this year.

Pam Shriver won the title by defeating Lori McNeil 6–4, 6–2 in the final.

== Seeds ==
1. (United States) Pam Shriver (champion)
2. (United States) Robin White (second round)
3. (Australia) Dianne Balestrat (first round)
4. (United States) Anne White (semifinals)
5. (United States) Lori McNeil (final)
6. (United States) Grace Kim (first round)
7. (United States) Wendy Prausa (quarterfinals)
8. (United States) Gigi Fernández (first round)

== Draw ==
=== Key ===
- Q = Qualifier
- WC = Wild card
- LL = Lucky loser
- Alt = Alternate
- SE = Special exempt
- PR = Protected ranking
- ITF = ITF entry
- JE = Junior exempt
- w/o = Walkover
- r = Retired
- d = Defaulted
- SR = Special ranking

=== Finals ===
Semifinals
1	(United States) Pam Shriver	6	6
4	(United States) Anne White	1	3
LL	(United States) Cammy MacGregor	2	2
5	(United States) Lori McNeil	6	6

Final
1	(United States) Pam Shriver	6	6
5	(United States) Lori McNeil	4	2

=== Top half ===
First round
1	(United States) P Shriver	6	6
(Australia) J Byrne	2	2
(United States) T Mochizuki	7	7
(United States) L Spain Short	6	5
(Brazil) C Monteiro	7	6
(United States) C Fernandez-Parker	6	2
(United States) K McDonald	6	6
6	(United States) G Kim	3	1
4	(United States) A White	6	6
(United Kingdom) M Javer	1	3
(United States) R Blount	6	1	6
Q	(United States) Jane Holdren	1	6	3
(South Africa) J Mundel	7	4	6
(Australia) A Tobin-Dingwall	5	6	1
(United States) L Antonoplis	6	6	4
7	(United States) W Prausa	7	3	6

Second round
1	(United States) P Shriver	6	6
(United States) T Mochizuki	1	1
(Brazil) C Monteiro	6	6
(United States) K McDonald	3	2
4	(United States) A White	6	6
(United States) R Blount	1	3
(South Africa) J Mundel	2	2
7	(United States) W Prausa	6	6

Quarterfinals
1	(United States) P Shriver	6	6
(Brazil) C Monteiro	2	4
4	(United States) A White	7	7
7	(United States) W Prausa	6	6

Semifinals
1	(United States) P Shriver	6	6
4	(United States) A White	1	3

=== Bottom half ===
First round
8	(United States) G Fernández	2	6	1
LL	(United States) C MacGregor	6	1	6
(Australia) L Field	4	4
Q	(Australia) R Bryant	6	6
(United States) Kerri Reiter	4	0
(United States) AM Fernandez	6	6
(Argentina) A Villagrán-Reami	6	6
3	(Australia) D Balestrat	4	4
5	(United States) L McNeil	7	6
(South Africa) E Reinach	6	3
Q	(United States) L Allen	2	6	6
(United States) C Copeland-Wilson	6	3	7
(United States) T Holladay	6	7
(United States) J Forman	2	6
(United States) JA Russell	4	6	3
2	(United States) R White	6	4	6

Second round
LL	(United States) C MacGregor	6	7
Q	(Australia) R Bryant	4	5
(United States) AM Fernandez	2	4
(Argentina) A Villagrán-Reami	6	6
5	(United States) L McNeil	6	6	6
(United States) C Copeland-Wilson	7	2	2
(United States) T Holladay	6	6
2	(United States) R White	3	2

Quarterfinals
LL	(United States) C MacGregor	7	6
(Argentina) A Villagrán-Reami	5	0
5	(United States) L McNeil	7	7
(United States) T Holladay	6	5

Semifinals
LL	(United States) C MacGregor	2	2
5	(United States) L McNeil	6	6
