= 1989 Hall of Fame Tennis Championships – Singles =

Singles
- 1989 Hall of Fame Tennis Championships and the Virginia Slims of Newport

Final
- Champion: (United States) Jim Pugh
- Runner-up: (Sweden) Peter Lundgren
- Score: 6–4, 4–6, 6–2

Details
- Draw: 32 (3WC/4Q)
- Seeds: 8

Events
Singles	men	women
Doubles	men	women
← 1988 ·	Hall of Fame Tennis Championships	· 1990 →
← 1988 ·	Virginia Slims of Newport	· 1990 →

Wally Masur was the defending champion, but lost in the first round to Matt Anger.

Jim Pugh won the title by defeating Peter Lundgren 6–4, 4–6, 6–2 in the final.

== Seeds ==
1. (United States) Paul Annacone (quarterfinals)
2. (United States) Johan Kriek (quarterfinals)
3. (Australia) John Fitzgerald (quarterfinals)
4. (United States) Derrick Rostagno (second round)
5. (Australia) Wally Masur (first round)
6. (Sweden) Peter Lundgren (final)
7. (South Africa) Pieter Aldrich (second round)
8. (New Zealand) Kelly Evernden (second round)

== Draw ==
=== Key ===
- Q = Qualifier
- WC = Wild card
- LL = Lucky loser
- Alt = Alternate
- ITF = ITF entry
- PR = Protected ranking
- SR = Special ranking
- SE = Special exempt
- JE = Junior exempt
- JR = Junior Accelerator Programme entrant
- CO = College Accelerator Programme entrant
- NG = Next Gen Accelerator Program entrant
- w/o = Walkover
- r = Retired
- d = Defaulted

=== Finals ===
Semifinals
(United States) Glenn Layendecker	3	4
6	(Sweden) Peter Lundgren	6	6
(United States) Jim Pugh	6	6	6
(South Africa) Danie Visser	4	7	3

Final
6	(Sweden) Peter Lundgren	4	6	2
(United States) Jim Pugh	6	4	6

=== Top half ===
First round
1	(United States) P Annacone	7	6
(United States) J Canter	5	4
WC	(United States) M Flur	1	2
(Australia) B Drewett	6	6
(United States) G Layendecker	6	6
Q	(United States) P Galbraith	4	3
WC	(United States) MV Washington	6	4	1
8	(New Zealand) K Evernden	4	6	6
3	(Australia) J Fitzgerald	6	6
(Canada) C Pridham	4	4
Q	(United States) B Garrow	2	6	6
(United States) B Garnett	6	3	4
WC	(United States) J Tarango	6	6
(United States) S Giammalva Jr.	1	4
(United States) K Kinnear	6	4
6	(Sweden) P Lundgren	7	6

Second round
1	(United States) P Annacone	4	6	6
(Australia) B Drewett	6	3	2
(United States) G Layendecker	4	6	6
8	(New Zealand) K Evernden	6	3	1
3	(Australia) J Fitzgerald	6	6
Q	(United States) B Garrow	3	3
WC	(United States) J Tarango	4	5
6	(Sweden) P Lundgren	6	7

Quarterfinals
1	(United States) P Annacone	6	3	6
(United States) G Layendecker	4	6	7
3	(Australia) J Fitzgerald	6	6
6	(Sweden) P Lundgren	7	7

Semifinals
(United States) G Layendecker	3	4
6	(Sweden) P Lundgren	6	6

=== Bottom half ===
First round
5	(Australia) W Masur	2	6
(United States) M Anger	6	7
(United States) J Pugh	6	6	6
(United States) T Wilkison	7	3	2
(India) V Amritraj	7	3	4
(West Germany) C Saceanu	6	6	6
(United States) R Van't Hof	4	1
4	(United States) D Rostagno	6	6
7	(South Africa) P Aldrich	6	6
(United Kingdom) N Broad	4	4
Q	(South Africa) B Talbot	2	3
(South Africa) D Visser	6	6
(South Africa) G Muller	6	7
Q	(United States) B Shelton	2	5
(Argentina) J Frana	4	3
2	(United States) J Kriek	6	6

Second round
(United States) M Anger	6	5
(United States) J Pugh	7	7
(West Germany) C Saceanu	6	1	7
4	(United States) D Rostagno	4	6	6
7	(South Africa) P Aldrich	4	6	3
(South Africa) D Visser	6	4	6
(South Africa) G Muller	1	4
2	(United States) J Kriek	6	6

Quarterfinals
(United States) J Pugh	6	6
(West Germany) C Saceanu	3	4
(South Africa) D Visser	6	6
2	(United States) J Kriek	3	2

Semifinals
(United States) J Pugh	6	6	6
(South Africa) D Visser	4	7	3
