= 1987 Transamerica Open – Singles =

Singles
- 1987 Transamerica Open

Final
- Champion: (Sweden) Peter Lundgren
- Runner-up: (United States) Jim Pugh
- Score: 6–1, 7–5

Details
- Draw: 32 (3WC/4Q/1LL)
- Seeds: 8

Events
Singles	Doubles
- Pacific Coast Championships

Defending champion John McEnroe was unable to compete this year, following a two-month suspension after a series of code violations caused at the US Open.

Peter Lundgren won the title by defeating Jim Pugh 6–1, 7–5 in the final.

== Seeds ==
1. (Czechoslovakia) Ivan Lendl (semifinals)
2. (United States) Tim Mayotte (first round)
3. (United States) Brad Gilbert (first round)
4. (France) Henri Leconte (first round)
5. (United States) David Pate (second round)
6. (United States) Scott Davis (first round)
7. (United States) Kevin Curren (second round)
8. (United States) Jay Berger (second round)

== Draw ==
Key

- Q = Qualifier
- WC = Wild card
- LL = Lucky loser
- Alt = Alternate
- ITF = ITF entry
- PR = Protected ranking
- SR = Special ranking
- SE = Special exempt
- JE = Junior exempt
- JR = Junior Accelerator Programme entrant
- CO = College Accelerator Programme entrant
- NG = Next Gen Accelerator Program entrant
- w/o = Walkover
- r = Retired
- d = Defaulted

=== Finals ===
Semifinals
1/WC	(Czechoslovakia) Ivan Lendl	3	6	6
(Sweden) Peter Lundgren	6	4	7
LL	(United States) Todd Nelson	3	7	4
(United States) Jim Pugh	6	6	6

Final
(Sweden) Peter Lundgren	6	7
(United States) Jim Pugh	1	5

=== Top half ===
First round
1/WC	(Czechoslovakia) I Lendl	6	6
(United States) M Purcell	2	3
(United States) J Grabb	6	6
WC	(United States) P McEnroe	2	2
Q	(United States) G Holmes	6	3	2
(United States) D Goldie	3	6	6
Q	(United States) G Layendecker	4	2
7	(United States) K Curren	6	6
3	(United States) B Gilbert	5	7	6
(United States) T Wilkison	7	6	7
Q	(United States) R Reneberg	6	7
WC	(United States) K Flach	2	6
(Sweden) P Lundgren	6	6
(South Africa) G Muller	4	3
(United States) D Rostagno	4	4
5	(United States) D Pate	6	6

Second round
1/WC	(Czechoslovakia) I Lendl	7	6
(United States) J Grabb	5	2
(United States) D Goldie	7	7
7	(United States) K Curren	6	6
(United States) T Wilkison	6	5	7
Q	(United States) R Reneberg	3	7	6
(Sweden) P Lundgren	3	6	6
5	(United States) D Pate	6	1	3

Quarterfinals
1/WC	(Czechoslovakia) I Lendl	5	6	6
(United States) D Goldie	7	4	3
(United States) T Wilkison	3	4
(Sweden) P Lundgren	6	6

Semifinals
1/WC	(Czechoslovakia) I Lendl	3	6	6
(Sweden) P Lundgren	6	4	7

=== Bottom half ===
First round
6	(United States) S Davis	2	3
(Peru) J Yzaga	6	6
(United States) K Jones	4	2
(United States) E Teltscher	6	6
LL	(United States) T Nelson	6	6
(United States) J Rive	3	3
(United States) M Anger	7	4	6
4	(France) H Leconte	6	6	4
8	(United States) J Berger	6	7
(South Africa) D Visser	3	5
(United States) T Witsken	2	3
(United States) S Giammalva Jr.	6	6
Q	(United States) W Hunt	7	6
(United States) P Fleming	5	4
(United States) J Pugh	7	6	7
2	(United States) T Mayotte	5	7	5

Second round
(Peru) J Yzaga	6	3	3
(United States) E Teltscher	4	6	6
LL	(United States) T Nelson	6	1	6
(United States) M Anger	1	6	3
8	(United States) J Berger	6	3
(United States) S Giammalva Jr.	7	6
Q	(United States) W Hunt	2	2
(United States) J Pugh	6	6

Quarterfinals
(United States) E Teltscher	1	6
LL	(United States) T Nelson	6	7
(United States) S Giammalva Jr.	3	5
(United States) J Pugh	6	7

Semifinals
LL	(United States) T Nelson	3	7	4
(United States) J Pugh	6	6	6
