= 1987 Player's Canadian Open – Men's doubles =

Men's doubles
- 1987 Player's Canadian Open

Final
- Champions: (Australia) Pat Cash (Sweden) Stefan Edberg
- Runners-up: (Australia) Peter Doohan (Australia) Laurie Warder
- Score: 6–7, 6–3, 6–4

Details
- Draw: 28 (1WC)
- Seeds: 8

Events
| Singles | men | women |
| Doubles | men | women |
- Canadian Open

Chip Hooper and Mike Leach were the defending champions, but lost in the quarterfinals to Pat Cash and Stefan Edberg.

Cash and Edberg won the title by defeating Peter Doohan and Laurie Warder 6–7, 6–3, 6–4 in the final.

== Seeds ==
The first four seeds received a bye to the second round.

1. (United States) Ken Flach / (United States) Robert Seguso (quarterfinals)
2. (United States) Paul Annacone / (South Africa) Christo van Rensburg (quarterfinals)
3. (West Germany) Boris Becker / (Socialist Federal Republic of Yugoslavia) Slobodan Živojinović (quarterfinals)
4. (Australia) Pat Cash / (Sweden) Stefan Edberg (champions)
5. (United States) Chip Hooper / (United States) Mike Leach (quarterfinals)
6. (United States) Kevin Curren / (United States) Gary Donnelly (second round)
7. (Australia) Peter Doohan / (Australia) Laurie Warder (final)
8. (United States) Kelly Jones / (United States) Jim Pugh (first round)

== Draw ==
Key

- Q = Qualifier
- WC = Wild card
- LL = Lucky loser
- Alt = Alternate
- ITF = ITF entry
- PR = Protected ranking
- SR = Special ranking
- SE = Special exempt
- JE = Junior exempt
- JR = Junior Accelerator Programme entrant
- CO = College Accelerator Programme entrant
- NG = Next Gen Accelerator Program entrant
- w/o = Walkover
- r = Retired
- d = Defaulted

=== Finals ===
Semifinals
7 | (Australia) Peter Doohan (Australia) Laurie Warder | 6 | 6
(United States) John McEnroe (United States) Patrick McEnroe | 3 | 2
4 | (Australia) Pat Cash (Sweden) Stefan Edberg | 6 | 6
(South Africa) Eddie Edwards (Paraguay) Francisco González | 2 | 2

Final
7 | (Australia) Peter Doohan (Australia) Laurie Warder | 7 | 3 | 4
4 | (Australia) Pat Cash (Sweden) Stefan Edberg | 6 | 6 | 6

=== Top half ===
First round
(Australia) B Drewett (Australia) W Masur | 6 | 6 | 6
(New Zealand) K Evernden (United States) J Kriek | 3 | 7 | 4
(United States) T Siegel (United States) T Witsken | 7 | 6
(Czechoslovakia) I Lendl (United States) B Scanlon | 5 | 3
(India) R Krishnan (France) É Winogradsky | 3 | 0
7 | (Australia) P Doohan (Australia) L Warder | 6 | 6
(United States) S Denton (United States) S Giammalva Jr. | 6 | 2 | 6
(Canada) Pierre Dufour (Canada) B Gyetko | 3 | 6 | 1
(South Africa) C Steyn (United States) Ti Wilkison | 7 | 2 | 1
(United States) J McEnroe (United States) P McEnroe | 6 | 6 | 6
(United States) J Letts (Sweden) P Lundgren | 4 | 6
6 | (United States) K Curren (United States) G Donelly | 6 | 7

Second round
1 | (United States) K Flach (United States) R Seguso | 7 | 6
(Australia) B Drewett (Australia) W Masur | 5 | 2
(United States) T Siegel (United States) T Witsken | 4 | 3
7 | (Australia) P Doohan (Australia) L Warder | 6 | 6
3 | (West Germany) B Becker (Socialist Federal Republic of Yugoslavia) S Živojinović | 7 | 4 | 6
(United States) S Denton (United States) S Giammalva Jr. | 6 | 6 | 3
(United States) J McEnroe (United States) P McEnroe | 4 | 7 | 6
6 | (United States) K Curren (United States) G Donelly | 6 | 5 | 1

Quarterfinals
1 | (United States) K Flach (United States) R Seguso | 6 | 2
7 | (Australia) P Doohan (Australia) L Warder | 7 | 6
3 | (West Germany) B Becker (Socialist Federal Republic of Yugoslavia) S Živojinović | 6 | 5 | 6
(United States) J McEnroe (United States) P McEnroe | 4 | 7 | 7

Semifinals
7 | (Australia) P Doohan (Australia) L Warder | 6 | 6
(United States) J McEnroe (United States) P McEnroe | 3 | 2

=== Bottom half ===
First round
5 | (United States) C Hooper (United States) M Leach | 6 | 6
WC | (Canada) H McDadi (Canada) C Pridham | 3 | 0
(United States) M Anger (United States) G Holmes | 6 | 3 | 4
(Canada) S Bonneau (Canada) A Sznajder | 2 | 6 | 6
(United States) J Ross (United States) L Scott | 6 | 3
(Australia) D Macpherson (United States) L Shiras | 7 | 6
8 | (United States) K Jones (United States) J Pugh | 2 | 4
(United States) M Freeman (United States) H Pfister | 6 | 6
(United States) J Arias (United States) E Teltscher | 3 | 4
(South Africa) E Edwards (Paraguay) F González | 6 | 6
(United States) T Pawsat (United States) R Reneberg | 2 | 7 | 7
(United States) D Livingston (United States) V Van Patten | 6 | 6 | 6

Second round
5 | (United States) C Hooper (United States) M Leach | 6 | 6
(Canada) S Bonneau (Canada) A Sznajder | 4 | 4
(Australia) D Macpherson (United States) L Shiras | 6 | 4
4 | (Australia) P Cash (Sweden) S Edberg | 7 | 6
(United States) M Freeman (United States) H Pfister | 6 | 6
(South Africa) E Edwards (Paraguay) F González | 7 | 7
(United States) T Pawsat (United States) R Reneberg | 4 | 6
2 | (United States) P Annacone (South Africa) C van Rensburg | 6 | 7

Quarterfinals
5 | (United States) C Hooper (United States) M Leach | 4 | 6 | 3
4 | (Australia) P Cash (Sweden) S Edberg | 6 | 3 | 6
(South Africa) E Edwards (Paraguay) F González | 4 | 7 | 6
2 | (United States) P Annacone (South Africa) C van Rensburg | 6 | 6 | 3

Semifinals
4 | (Australia) P Cash (Sweden) S Edberg | 6 | 6
(South Africa) E Edwards (Paraguay) F González | 2 | 2
