= 1987 Transamerica Open – Doubles =

Doubles
- 1987 Transamerica Open

Final
- Champions: (United States) Jim Grabb (United States) Patrick McEnroe
- Runners-up: (United States) Glenn Layendecker (United States) Todd Witsken
- Score: 6–2, 0–6, 6–4

Details
- Draw: 16
- Seeds: 4

Events
Singles	Doubles
- Pacific Coast Championships

Peter Fleming and John McEnroe were the defending champions, but none competed this year. Fleming chose to compete on the singles tournament only, losing in the first round to Woody Hunt; McEnroe faced a two-month suspension after a series of code violations received at the US Open.

Jim Grabb and Patrick McEnroe won the title by defeating Glenn Layendecker and Todd Witsken 6–2, 0–6, 6–4 in the final.

== Seeds ==
1. (United States) Ken Flach / (United States) Robert Seguso (first round)
2. (United States) Chip Hooper / (United States) Mike Leach (first round)
3. (United States) Kevin Curren / (United States) Mike De Palmer (quarterfinals)
4. (United States) Andy Kohlberg / (United States) Robert Van't Hof (semifinals)

== Draw ==
Key

- Q = Qualifier
- WC = Wild card
- LL = Lucky loser
- Alt = Alternate
- ITF = ITF entry
- PR = Protected ranking
- SR = Special ranking
- SE = Special exempt
- JE = Junior exempt
- JR = Junior Accelerator Programme entrant
- CO = College Accelerator Programme entrant
- NG = Next Gen Accelerator Program entrant
- w/o = Walkover
- r = Retired
- d = Defaulted

=== Draw ===
First round
1	(United States) K Flach (United States) R Seguso	3	6	6
(United States) J Grabb (United States) P McEnroe	6	4	7
(United States) M Flur (United States) E Teltscher	6	6
(United States) J Letts (Sweden) P Lundgren	4	3
4	(United States) A Kohlberg (United States) R Van't Hof	6	6
(United States) B Gilbert (United States) T Wilkison	1	4
(United States) J Rive (South Africa) C Steyn	5	6
(United States) K Jones (South Africa) G Muller	7	7
(United States) S Denton (United States) S Giammalva Jr.	5	7	6
(United States) L Bourne (United States) J Klaparda	7	5	1
(United States) R Leach (United States) J Pugh	4	6
3	(United States) K Curren (United States) M De Palmer	6	7
(United States) J Tarango (United States) D Wheaton	6	6	6
(United States) G Layendecker (United States) T Witsken	2	7	7
(United States) M Anger (United States) G Holmes	6	6
2	(United States) C Hooper (United States) M Leach	3	3

Quarterfinals
(United States) J Grabb (United States) P McEnroe	6	2	6
(United States) M Flur (United States) E Teltscher	2	6	3
4	(United States) A Kohlberg (United States) R Van't Hof	7	6
(United States) K Jones (South Africa) G Muller	6	4
(United States) S Denton (United States) S Giammalva Jr.	4	6	6
3	(United States) K Curren (United States) M De Palmer	6	3	4
(United States) G Layendecker (United States) T Witsken	6	6
(United States) M Anger (United States) G Holmes	4	4

Semifinals
(United States) J Grabb (United States) P McEnroe	6	3	6
4	(United States) A Kohlberg (United States) R Van't Hof	4	6	4
(United States) S Denton (United States) S Giammalva Jr.	6	6	3
(United States) G Layendecker (United States) T Witsken	3	7	6

Final
(United States) J Grabb (United States) P McEnroe	6	0	6
(United States) G Layendecker (United States) T Witsken	2	6	4
