= 1989 Hall of Fame Tennis Championships – Doubles =

Doubles
- 1989 Hall of Fame Tennis Championships and the Virginia Slims of Newport

Final
- Champions: (United States) Patrick Galbraith (United States) Brian Garrow
- Runners-up: (United Kingdom) Neil Broad (South Africa) Stefan Kruger
- Score: 2–6, 7–5, 6–3

Details
- Draw: 16
- Seeds: 4

Events
Singles	men	women
Doubles	men	women
- Hall of Fame Tennis Championships Virginia Slims of Newport

Kelly Jones and Peter Lundgren were the defending champions, but Jones chose to compete at Boston during the same week. Lundgren teamed up with Vijay Amritraj and lost in the quarterfinals to Neil Broad and Stefan Kruger.

Patrick Galbraith and Brian Garrow won the title by defeating Broad and Kruger 2–6, 7–5, 6–3 in the final.

== Seeds ==
1. (South Africa) Pieter Aldrich / (South Africa) Danie Visser (first round)
2. (South Africa) Gary Muller / (United States) Tim Wilkison (first round)
3. (United Kingdom) Neil Broad / (South Africa) Stefan Kruger (final)
4. (United States) Sammy Giammalva Jr. / (United States) Glenn Layendecker (semifinals)

== Draw ==
Key

- Q = Qualifier
- WC = Wild card
- LL = Lucky loser
- Alt = Alternate
- ITF = ITF entry
- PR = Protected ranking
- SR = Special ranking
- SE = Special exempt
- JE = Junior exempt
- JR = Junior Accelerator Programme entrant
- CO = College Accelerator Programme entrant
- NG = Next Gen Accelerator Program entrant
- w/o = Walkover
- r = Retired
- d = Defaulted

=== Draw ===
First round
1	(South Africa) P Aldrich (South Africa) D Visser	6	6
(United States) B Garnett (United States) K Kinnear	7	7
(United States) B Shelton (United States) K Thorne	7	6
(South Africa) M Barnard (South Africa) T Reynders	6	3
3	(United Kingdom) N Broad (South Africa) S Kruger	6	5	6
(United States) M Anger (United States) D Rostagno	3	7	2
(India) V Amritraj (Sweden) P Lundgren	4	7	7
(Argentina) J Frana (Argentina) G Luza	6	6	6
(West Germany) C Saceanu (South Africa) B Talbot	6	7
(United States) M Flur (United States) L Scott	3	6
(United States) J Kriek (United States) G Van Emburgh	5	6	4
4	(United States) S Giammalva Jr. (United States) G Layendecker	7	3	6
(Barbados) Richard Ashby (United States) Mark Jacobson	6	4
(United States) J Canter (United States) J Tarango	7	6
(United States) P Galbraith (United States) B Garrow	6	6	7
2	(South Africa) G Muller (United States) T Wilkison	1	7	5

Quarterfinals
(United States) B Garnett (United States) K Kinnear	6	7	6
(United States) B Shelton (United States) K Thorne	7	5	7
3	(United Kingdom) N Broad (South Africa) S Kruger	6	7
(India) V Amritraj (Sweden) P Lundgren	3	5
(West Germany) C Saceanu (South Africa) B Talbot	5	7	6
4	(United States) S Giammalva Jr. (United States) G Layendecker	7	6	7
(United States) J Canter (United States) J Tarango	4	6	3
(United States) P Galbraith (United States) B Garrow	6	4	6

Semifinals
(United States) B Shelton (United States) K Thorne	7	2	4
3	(United Kingdom) N Broad (South Africa) S Kruger	6	6	6
4	(United States) S Giammalva Jr. (United States) G Layendecker	6	3
(United States) P Galbraith (United States) B Garrow	7	6

Final
3	(United Kingdom) N Broad (South Africa) S Kruger	6	5	3
(United States) P Galbraith (United States) B Garrow	2	7	6
