= 1989 Virginia Slims of Newport – Singles =

Singles
- 1989 Hall of Fame Tennis Championships and the Virginia Slims of Newport
- 1988 Champion: (United States) Lori McNeil

Final
- Champion: (United States) Zina Garrison
- Runner-up: (United States) Pam Shriver
- Score: 6–0, 6–1

Events
Singles	men	women
Doubles	men	women
← 1988 ·	Hall of Fame Tennis Championships	· 1990 →
← 1988 ·	Virginia Slims of Newport	· 1990 →

Lori McNeil was the defending champion but lost in the second round to Laura Gildemeister.

Zina Garrison won in the final 6–0, 6–1 against Pam Shriver.

== Seeds ==
A champion seed is indicated in bold text while text in italics indicates the round in which that seed was eliminated.

1. (United States) **Zina Garrison (champion)**
2. (United States) Pam Shriver (final)
3. (United States) Lori McNeil (second round)
4. (United States) Patty Fendick (first round)
5. (United States) Amy Frazier (first round)
6. (South Africa) Rosalyn Fairbank (semifinals)
7. (United States) Gretchen Magers (second round)
8. (United States) Gigi Fernández (semifinals)

== Draw ==
=== Key ===
- Q = Qualifier
- WC = Wild card
- LL = Lucky loser
- Alt = Alternate
- SE = Special exempt
- PR = Protected ranking
- ITF = ITF entry
- JE = Junior exempt
- w/o = Walkover
- r = Retired
- d = Defaulted
- SR = Special ranking

First round
1	(United States) **Z Garrison**	**6**	**6**
(United States) L Albano	1	1
(United States) J Santrock	0	3
(United States) **M McGrath**	**6**	**6**
(United States) **M Louie-Harper**	**6**	4	**6**
(United Kingdom) M Javer	3	**6**	3
(Australia) **M Jaggard**	**6**	**6**
5	(United States) A Frazier	1	2
3	(United States) **L McNeil**	**6**	**7**
(United States) W White	4	5
(United States) M L Daniels	3	**6**	3
(Peru) **L Gildemeister**	**6**	2	**6**
Q	(United States) **A Ivan**	**6**	**6**
(United States) D Graham	4	4
(New Zealand) J Richardson	**6**	1	4
8	(United States) **G Fernández**	3	**6**	**6**
6	(South Africa) **R Fairbank**	**6**	**6**
(United States) K Adams	1	4
(Australia) **E Smylie**	**7**	6	**7**
(United States) R White	6	**7**	5
(United States) E deLone	0	1
Q	(South Africa) **R Field**	**6**	**6**
(United States) **H Na**	3	**7**	**6**
4	(United States) P Fendick	**6**	5	1
7	(United States) **G Magers**	**6**	**7**
(United States) L-A Eldredge	2	5
(United States) K Kessaris	3	**6**	5
(Canada) **J Hetherington**	**6**	2	**7**
Q	(Finland) **A Aallonen**	**7**	**7**
Q	(United States) L Antonoplis	6	5
(United States) A Henricksson	3	2
2	(United States) **P Shriver**	**6**	**6**

Second round
1	(United States) **Z Garrison**	**6**	**6**
(United States) M McGrath	4	0
(United States) M Louie-Harper	3	4
(Australia) **M Jaggard**	**6**	**6**
3	(United States) L McNeil	5	2
(Peru) **L Gildemeister**	**7**	**6**
Q	(United States) A Ivan	1	2
8	(United States) **G Fernández**	**6**	**6**
6	(South Africa) **R Fairbank**	**7**	**6**
(Australia) E Smylie	6	3
Q	(South Africa) R Field	1	4
(United States) **H Na**	**6**	**6**
7	(United States) G Magers	3	6
(Canada) **J Hetherington**	**6**	**7**
Q	(Finland) A Aallonen	2	2
2	(United States) **P Shriver**	**6**	**6**

Quarterfinals
1	(United States) **Z Garrison**	**6**	**6**
(Australia) M Jaggard	4	1
(Peru) L Gildemeister	3	3
8	(United States) **G Fernández**	**6**	**6**
6	(South Africa) **R Fairbank**	**7**	**6**
(United States) H Na	6	4
(Canada) J Hetherington	4	**6**	2
2	(United States) **P Shriver**	**6**	3	**6**

Semifinals
1	(United States) **Z Garrison**	**6**	**6**
8	(United States) G Fernández	4	3
6	(South Africa) R Fairbank	**6**	3	6
2	(United States) **P Shriver**	3	**6**	**7**

Final
1	(United States) **Zina Garrison**	**6**	**6**
2	(United States) Pam Shriver	0	1
