= 1987 Schenectady Open – Doubles =

Doubles
- 1987 Schenectady Open

Final
- Champions: (United States) Gary Donnelly (South Africa) Gary Muller
- Runners-up: (United States) Brad Pearce (United States) Jim Pugh
- Score: 7–6, 6–2

Events
Singles	Doubles
Schenectady Open	· 1988 →

This was the first edition of the event.

Gary Donnelly and Gary Muller won the title, defeating Brad Pearce and Jim Pugh 7–6, 6–2 in the final.

== Seeds ==
1. (United States) Gary Donnelly / (South Africa) Gary Muller (champions)
2. (United States) Brad Pearce / (United States) Jim Pugh (final)
3. (United States) Marc Flur / (United States) Chip Hooper (quarterfinals)
4. (United States) John Letts / (South Africa) Michael Robertson (quarterfinals)

== Draw ==
=== Key ===
- Q = Qualifier
- WC = Wild card
- LL = Lucky loser
- Alt = Alternate
- SE = Special exempt
- PR = Protected ranking
- ITF = ITF entry
- JE = Junior exempt
- w/o = Walkover
- r = Retired
- d = Defaulted
- SR = Special ranking

=== Draw ===
First round
1	(United States) G Donnelly (South Africa) G Muller	6	7
(Australia) D Macpherson (Australia) S Youl	3	6
(United States) M Davis (United States) G Layendecker	6	6
(Sweden) J Carlsson (West Germany) P Kühnen	2	3
3	(United States) M Flur (United States) C Hooper	6	6
(United States) J Lapidus (South Africa) B Moir	4	1
LL	(United States) N Caswell (United States) F Hunt	6	3
(Australia) D Graham (United States) B Testerman	7	6
(United States) D Livingston (United States) V Van Patten	7	6
(United States) R Matuszewski (West Germany) C Saceanu	6	3
(United States) S Denton (United States) D Dowlen	6	3
4	(United States) J Letts (South Africa) M Robertson	7	6
(Colombia) Á Jordan (United States) M Lee	6	3	6
(United States) D MacBride (Mexico) F Pérez Pascal	4	6	4
(Mexico) F Maciel (Nigeria) T Mmoh	4	4
2	(United States) B Pearce (United States) J Pugh	6	6

Quarterfinals
1	(United States) G Donnelly (South Africa) G Muller	7	7
(United States) M Davis (United States) G Layendecker	6	6
3	(United States) M Flur (United States) C Hooper	5	6
(Australia) D Graham (United States) B Testerman	7	7
(United States) D Livingston (United States) V Van Patten	7	6
4	(United States) J Letts (South Africa) M Robertson	6	2
(Colombia) Á Jordan (United States) M Lee	0	3
2	(United States) B Pearce (United States) J Pugh	6	6

Semifinals
1	(United States) G Donnelly (South Africa) G Muller	6	7
(Australia) D Graham (United States) B Testerman	3	6
(United States) D Livingston (United States) V Van Patten	3	1
2	(United States) B Pearce (United States) J Pugh	6	6

Final
1	(United States) G Donnelly (South Africa) G Muller	7	6
2	(United States) B Pearce (United States) J Pugh	6	2
