= 1987 Schenectady Open – Singles =

Singles
- 1987 Schenectady Open

Final
- Champion: (Peru) Jaime Yzaga
- Runner-up: (United States) Jim Pugh
- Score: 0–6, 7–6, 6–1

Events
Singles	Doubles
- Schenectady Open

This was the first edition of the event.

Jaime Yzaga won the title, defeating Jim Pugh 0–6, 7–6, 6–1 in the final.

== Seeds ==
1. (Peru) Jaime Yzaga (champion)
2. (United States) Andre Agassi (first round)
3. (Nigeria) Nduka Odizor (first round)
4. (United States) Jim Pugh (final)
5. (United States) Ben Testerman (quarterfinals)
6. (Sweden) Johan Carlsson (first round)
7. (France) Éric Winogradsky (second round, withdrew)
8. (South Africa) Barry Moir (first round)

== Draw ==
Key

- Q = Qualifier
- WC = Wild card
- LL = Lucky loser
- Alt = Alternate
- ITF = ITF entry
- PR = Protected ranking
- SR = Special ranking
- SE = Special exempt
- JE = Junior exempt
- JR = Junior Accelerator Programme entrant
- CO = College Accelerator Programme entrant
- NG = Next Gen Accelerator Program entrant
- w/o = Walkover
- r = Retired
- d = Defaulted

=== Finals ===
Semifinals
1	(Peru) Jaime Yzaga	6	6
(Nigeria) Tony Mmoh	3	2
4	(United States) Jim Pugh	6	6
(Sweden) Thomas Högstedt	3	4

Final
1	(Peru) Jaime Yzaga	0	7	6
4	(United States) Jim Pugh	6	6	1

=== Top half ===
First round
1	(Peru) J Yzaga	6	6	6
(West Germany) P Moraing	7	3	1
(United States) M Davis	7	6
(West Germany) P Kühnen	6	1
Q	(Colombia) Á Jordan	6	4	6
WC	(Mexico) F Maciel	1	6	4
(United States) J Lapidus	6	6
8	(South Africa) B Moir	2	4
3	(Nigeria) N Odizor	3	4
(Nigeria) T Mmoh	6	6
(United States) C Hooper	4	6
Q	(United States) P Chamberlin	6	7
WC	(United States) V Van Patten	7	6
(United States) R Matuszewski	6	3
(Australia) S Youl	7	6
6	(Sweden) J Carlsson	6	3

Second round
1	(Peru) J Yzaga	5	6	6
(United States) M Davis	7	2	2
Q	(Colombia) Á Jordan	4	4
(United States) J Lapidus	6	6
(Nigeria) T Mmoh	1	6	6
Q	(United States) P Chamberlin	6	3	3
WC	(United States) V Van Patten	7	7
(Australia) S Youl	6	6

Quarterfinals
1	(Peru) J Yzaga	6	6
(United States) J Lapidus	2	0
(Nigeria) T Mmoh	6	7
WC	(United States) V Van Patten	4	6

Semifinals
1	(Peru) J Yzaga	6	6
(Nigeria) T Mmoh	3	2

=== Bottom half ===
First round
5	(United States) B Testerman	6	6
Q	(South Africa) M Robertson	3	2
(West Germany) C Saceanu	4	6	7
WC	(United States) M Lee	6	3	6
(Canada) M Laurendeau	6	4	6
(Austria) A Antonitsch	1	6	4
(United States) G Donnelly	6	6
4	(United States) J Pugh	7	7
7	(France) É Winogradsky	7	6
(Canada) S Bonneau	6	3
(United States) M Flur	6	2	4
(Sweden) T Högstedt	3	6	6
(United States) B Pearce	6	6
Q	(United States) J Letts	2	4
(South Africa) G Muller	6	6
2	(United States) A Agassi	3	3

Second round
5	(United States) B Testerman	7	5	7
(West Germany) C Saceanu	6	7	6
(Canada) M Laurendeau	3	3
4	(United States) J Pugh	6	6
7	(France) É Winogradsky
(Sweden) T Högstedt	w/o
(United States) B Pearce	6	4	5
(South Africa) G Muller	3	6	7

Quarterfinals
5	(United States) B Testerman	2	3
4	(United States) J Pugh	6	6
(Sweden) T Högstedt	7	6
(South Africa) G Muller	6	3

Semifinals
4	(United States) J Pugh	6	6
(Sweden) T Högstedt	3	4
