= 1985 Hall of Fame Tennis Championships – Doubles =

Doubles
- 1985 Hall of Fame Tennis Championships

Final
- Champions: (Australia) Peter Doohan (United States) Sammy Giammalva Jr.
- Runners-up: (United States) Paul Annacone (South Africa) Christo van Rensburg
- Score: 6–1, 6–3

Details
- Draw: 16
- Seeds: 4

Events
| Singles | Doubles |
| ← 1984 · | Hall of Fame Open | · 1986 → |

David Graham and Laurie Warder were the defending champions, but both players chose to compete at Boston during the same week, reaching the quarterfinals.

Peter Doohan and Sammy Giammalva Jr. won the title by defeating Paul Annacone and Christo van Rensburg 6–1, 6–3 in the final.

== Seeds ==
1. (United States) Paul Annacone / (South Africa) Christo van Rensburg (final)
2. (United States) Johan Kriek / (United States) Robert Seguso (quarterfinals)
3. (Paraguay) Francisco González / (United States) Matt Mitchell (semifinals)
4. (India) Vijay Amritraj / (Australia) John Fitzgerald (first round)

== Draw ==
=== Key ===
- Q = Qualifier
- WC = Wild card
- LL = Lucky loser
- Alt = Alternate
- SE = Special exempt
- PR = Protected ranking
- ITF = ITF entry
- JE = Junior exempt
- w/o = Walkover
- r = Retired
- d = Defaulted
- SR = Special ranking

=== Draw ===
First round
1 | (United States) P Annacone (South Africa) C van Rensburg | 6 | 6
(United States) S DeVries (United States) R Leach | 4 | 3
(United States) R Knapp (South Africa) C Steyn | 7 | 6
(Chile) R Acuña (Puerto Rico) E Fernández | 6 | 1
3 | (Paraguay) F González (United States) M Mitchell | 7 | 7
(United States) B Cox (United States) A Kohlberg | 5 | 6
(New Zealand) R Simpson (United States) J Turpin | 6 | 6 | 3
(United States) Ti Gullikson (United States) To Gullikson | 4 | 7 | 6
(Australia) P Doohan (United States) S Giammalva Jr. | 7 | 6
(United States) G Layendecker (Canada) G Michibata | 6 | 2
(United States) C Hooper (United States) L Shiras | 7 | 0 | 6
4 | (India) V Amritraj (Australia) J Fitzgerald | 6 | 6 | 2
(United States) D Cassidy (United States) J Grabb | 4 | 6
(United States) S Davis (United States) D Pate | 6 | 7
(United States) M Flur (United States) S McCain | 6 | 3
2 | (United States) J Kriek (United States) R Seguso | 7 | 6

Quarterfinals
1 | (United States) P Annacone (South Africa) C van Rensburg | 6 | 6 | 7
(United States) R Knapp (South Africa) C Steyn | 7 | 4 | 6
3 | (Paraguay) F González (United States) M Mitchell | 6 | 4 | 6
(United States) Ti Gullikson (United States) To Gullikson | 2 | 6 | 4
(Australia) P Doohan (United States) S Giammalva Jr. | 6 | 6
(United States) C Hooper (United States) L Shiras | 3 | 4
(United States) S Davis (United States) D Pate | 6 | 6 | 6
2 | (United States) J Kriek (United States) R Seguso | 7 | 4 | 4

Semifinals
1 | (United States) P Annacone (South Africa) C van Rensburg | 7 | 6 | 5
3 | (Paraguay) F González (United States) M Mitchell | 6 | 7 | 2^{r}
(Australia) P Doohan (United States) S Giammalva Jr. | 4 | 7 | 7
(United States) S Davis (United States) D Pate | 6 | 6 | 6

Final
1 | (United States) P Annacone (South Africa) C van Rensburg | 1 | 3
(Australia) P Doohan (United States) S Giammalva Jr. | 6 | 6
