= 1987 Player's Canadian Open – Men's singles =

Men's singles
- 1987 Player's Canadian Open

Final
- Champion: (Czechoslovakia) Ivan Lendl
- Runner-up: (Sweden) Stefan Edberg
- Score: 6–4, 7–6

Details
- Draw: 56
- Seeds: 16

Events
Singles	men	women
Doubles	men	women
← 1986 ·	Player's Canadian Open	· 1988 →

Boris Becker was the defending champion, but lost in the semifinals this year.

Ivan Lendl won the title, defeating Stefan Edberg 6–4, 7–6 in the final.

== Seeds ==
1. (Czechoslovakia) Ivan Lendl (champion)
2. (Sweden) Stefan Edberg (final)
3. (West Germany) Boris Becker (semifinals)
4. (United States) Jimmy Connors (semifinals)
5. (Australia) Pat Cash (third round)
6. (United States) John McEnroe (quarterfinals)
7. (United States) Tim Mayotte (second round)
8. (United States) Kevin Curren (quarterfinals)
9. (Australia) Wally Masur (third round)
10. (Socialist Federal Republic of Yugoslavia) Slobodan Živojinović (quarterfinals)
11. (United States) Johan Kriek (second round)
12. N/A
13. (United States) Jay Berger (third round, retired)
14. (United States) Tim Wilkison (second round)
15. (United States) Jimmy Arias (third round)
16. (Australia) Peter Doohan (first round)

== Draw ==
=== Key ===
- Q = Qualifier
- WC = Wild card
- LL = Lucky loser
- Alt = Alternate
- SE = Special exempt
- PR = Protected ranking
- ITF = ITF entry
- JE = Junior exempt
- w/o = Walkover
- r = Retired
- d = Defaulted
- SR = Special ranking

=== Finals ===
Semifinals
1	(Czechoslovakia) Ivan Lendl	7	6
4	(United States) Jimmy Connors	5	4
3	(West Germany) Boris Becker	2	4
2	(Sweden) Stefan Edberg	6	6

Final
1	(Czechoslovakia) Ivan Lendl	6	7
2	(Sweden) Stefan Edberg	4	6

=== Top half ===
==== Section 1 ====
First round
(United States) B Scanlon	5	1
(United States) T Witsken	7	6
(United States) G Holmes	7	6
(United States) R Matuszewski	6	4
WC	(Canada) A Sznajder	7	2	7
16	(Australia) P Doohan	6	6	6
10	(Socialist Federal Republic of Yugoslavia) S Živojinović	6	4	6
(United States) M Freeman	4	6	1
(United States) M Kures	2	1^{r}
(India) R Krishnan	6	1
Q	(United States) J Ross	3	5
(New Zealand) K Evernden	6	7

Second round
1	(Czechoslovakia) I Lendl	6	6
(United States) T Witsken	3	2
(United States) G Holmes	6	6
WC	(Canada) A Sznajder	7	7
10	(Socialist Federal Republic of Yugoslavia) S Živojinović	6	7
(India) R Krishnan	4	5
(New Zealand) K Evernden	6	5	6
7	(United States) T Mayotte	2	7	3

Third round
1	(Czechoslovakia) I Lendl	6	6
WC	(Canada) A Sznajder	1	1
10	(Socialist Federal Republic of Yugoslavia) S Živojinović	6	6
(New Zealand) K Evernden	1	4

Quarterfinals
1	(Czechoslovakia) I Lendl	6	7
10	(Socialist Federal Republic of Yugoslavia) S Živojinović	3	5

==== Section 2 ====
First round
(United States) D Rostagno	6	7
LL	(United States) L Scott	3	6
(United States) J Canter	3	1
(United States) R Seguso	6	6
(Australia) B Drewett	4	2
13	(United States) J Berger	6	6
11	(United States) J Kriek	6	6	7
(United States) M Leach	2	7	6
(Sweden) J Carlsson	6	6	7
(United States) E Teltscher	4	7	6
(South Africa) C Steyn	6	6
WC	(Canada) W Cowan	4	4

Second round
4	(United States) J Connors	7	6
(United States) D Rostagno	6	1
(United States) R Seguso	2	5
13	(United States) J Berger	6	7
11	(United States) J Kriek	6	6	4
(Sweden) J Carlsson	4	7	6
(South Africa) C Steyn	3	1
6	(United States) J McEnroe	6	6

Third round
4	(United States) J Connors	4	7	4
13	(United States) J Berger	6	5	0^{r}
(Sweden) J Carlsson	3	2
6	(United States) J McEnroe	6	6

Quarterfinals
4	(United States) J Connors	6	3	6
6	(United States) J McEnroe	3	6	3

==== Section 3 ====
First round
Q	(Argentina) R Saad	6	6
(Canada) S Bonneau	4	4
(France) É Winogradsky	7	2	3
(United States) S Giammalva Jr.	6	6	6
(Sweden) P Lundgren	6	6
LL	(United States) L Shiras	2	0
14	(United States) T Wilkison	6	6
Q	(United Kingdom) L Bourne	2	3
(Canada) M Wostenholme	0	3
Q	(United States) R Reneberg	6	6
Q	(United States) C Hooper	6	1
(United States) K Jones	7	6

Second round
5	(Australia) P Cash	6	6
Q	(Argentina) R Saad	0	0
(United States) S Giammalva Jr.	5	1
(Sweden) P Lundgren	7	6
14	(United States) T Wilkison	4	4
Q	(United States) R Reneberg	6	6
(United States) K Jones	5	4
3	(West Germany) B Becker	7	6

Third round
5	(Australia) P Cash	4	6
(Sweden) P Lundgren	6	7
Q	(United States) R Reneberg	2	2
3	(West Germany) B Becker	6	6

Quarterfinals
(Sweden) P Lundgren	6	2	1
3	(West Germany) B Becker	1	6	6

==== Section 4 ====
First round
(South Africa) E Edwards	5	4
(United States) J Pugh	7	6
(United States) G Donnelly	3	5
(Canada) M Laurendeau	6	7
Q	(Australia) D Macpherson	0	3
9	(Australia) W Masur	6	6
15	(United States) J Arias	6	6
WC	(Canada) H McDadi	3	3
Q	(United States) H Pfister	2	2
(West Germany) M Westphal	6	6
WC	(Canada) C Pridham	6	2	6
(Australia) J Fitzgerald	2	6	3

Second round
8	(United States) K Curren	7	7
(United States) J Pugh	6	6
(Canada) M Laurendeau	5	1
9	(Australia) W Masur	7	6
15	(United States) J Arias	6	6
(West Germany) M Westphal	2	4
WC	(Canada) C Pridham	5	6
2	(Sweden) S Edberg	7	7

Third round
8	(United States) K Curren	7	4	7
9	(Australia) W Masur	5	6	5
15	(United States) J Arias	5	2
2	(Sweden) S Edberg	7	6

Quarterfinals
8	(United States) K Curren	6	5
2	(Sweden) S Edberg	7	7
