= 1989 Virginia Slims of Newport – Doubles =

Doubles
- 1989 Hall of Fame Tennis Championships and the Virginia Slims of Newport
- 1988 Champions: (South Africa) Rosalyn Fairbank (United States) Barbara Potter

Final
- Champions: (United States) Gigi Fernández (United States) Lori McNeil
- Runners-up: (Australia) Elizabeth Smylie (Australia) Wendy Turnbull
- Score: 6–3, 6–7, 7–5

Events
Singles	men	women
Doubles	men	women
← 1988 ·	Hall of Fame Tennis Championships	· 1990 →
← 1988 ·	Virginia Slims of Newport	· 1990 →

Rosalyn Fairbank and Barbara Potter were the defending champions but did not compete that year.

Gigi Fernández and Lori McNeil won in the final 6–3, 6–7, 7–5 against Elizabeth Smylie and Wendy Turnbull.

== Seeds ==
Champion seeds are indicated in bold text while text in italics indicates the round in which those seeds were eliminated.

1. (United States) Patty Fendick / (Canada) Jill Hetherington (quarterfinals)
2. (United States) Katrina Adams / (United States) Zina Garrison (semifinals)
3. (United States) **Gigi Fernández** / (United States) **Lori McNeil (champions)**
4. (Australia) Elizabeth Smylie / (Australia) Wendy Turnbull (final)

== Draw ==
=== Key ===
- Q = Qualifier
- WC = Wild card
- LL = Lucky loser
- Alt = Alternate
- SE = Special exempt
- PR = Protected ranking
- ITF = ITF entry
- JE = Junior exempt
- w/o = Walkover
- r = Retired
- d = Defaulted
- SR = Special ranking

First round
1	(United States) **P Fendick** (Canada) **J Hetherington**	**6**	6	**7**
(New Zealand) J Richardson (United States) J Smoller	3	**7**	6
(United States) D Graham (United States) S Birch	4	4
(United States) **M McGrath** (United States) **P Shriver**	**6**	**6**
3	(United States) **G Fernández** (United States) **L McNeil**	**7**	**6**
(United States) A Frazier (United States) L Spadea	6	1
(United States) **M L Daniels** (United States) **W White**	**6**	**7**
(United States) A Henricksson (United States) G Magers	2	6
(United States) J Goodling (United States) L Harvey-Wild	5	1
(United States) **L Antonoplis** (United States) **D Scott**	**7**	**6**
(South Africa) L Barnard (United Kingdom) J Salmon	4	5
4	(Australia) **E Smylie** (Australia) **W Turnbull**	**6**	**7**
(Finland) A Aallonen (Brazil) T Zambrzycki	3	2
(Peru) **L Gildemeister** (United States) **M Louie-Harper**	**6**	**6**
(United States) H Na (United States) J Thomas	**6**	3	3
2	(United States) **K Adams** (United States) **Z Garrison**	3	**6**	**6**

Quarterfinals
1	(United States) P Fendick (Canada) J Hetherington	6	6
(United States) **M McGrath** (United States) **P Shriver**	**7**	**7**
3	(United States) **G Fernández** (United States) **L McNeil**	**6**	**6**
(United States) M L Daniels (United States) W White	3	0
(United States) L Antonoplis (United States) D Scott	**7**	4	4
4	(Australia) **E Smylie** (Australia) **W Turnbull**	6	**6**	**6**
(Peru) L Gildemeister (United States) M Louie-Harper	0	0
2	(United States) **K Adams** (United States) **Z Garrison**	**6**	**6**

Semifinals
(United States) M McGrath (United States) P Shriver	3	4
3	(United States) **G Fernández** (United States) **L McNeil**	**6**	**6**
4	(Australia) **E Smylie** (Australia) **W Turnbull**	6	**7**	**7**
2	(United States) K Adams (United States) Z Garrison	**7**	6	6

Final
3	(United States) **Gigi Fernández** (United States) **Lori McNeil**	**6**	6	**7**
4	(Australia) Elizabeth Smylie (Australia) Wendy Turnbull	3	**7**	5
