= 1985 Hall of Fame Tennis Championships – Singles =

Singles
- 1985 Hall of Fame Tennis Championships

Final
- Champion: (United States) Tom Gullikson
- Runner-up: (United States) John Sadri
- Score: 6–3, 7–5

Details
- Draw: 32 (3WC/4Q)
- Seeds: 8

Events
Singles	Doubles
← 1984 ·	Hall of Fame Open	· 1986 →

Vijay Amritraj was the defending champion, but lost in the first round to David Pate.

Tom Gullikson won the title by defeating John Sadri 6–3, 7–5 in the final.

== Seeds ==
1. (United States) Johan Kriek (quarterfinals)
2. (United States) Tim Mayotte (semifinals)
3. (United States) Scott Davis (quarterfinals)
4. (United States) David Pate (semifinals)
5. (United States) Paul Annacone (quarterfinals)
6. (United States) John Sadri (final)
7. (United States) Sammy Giammalva Jr. (first round)
8. (Australia) John Fitzgerald (second round)

== Draw ==
=== Key ===
- Q = Qualifier
- WC = Wild card
- LL = Lucky loser
- Alt = Alternate
- SE = Special exempt
- PR = Protected ranking
- ITF = ITF entry
- JE = Junior exempt
- w/o = Walkover
- r = Retired
- d = Defaulted
- SR = Special ranking

=== Finals ===
Semifinals
(United States) Tom Gullikson	7	6	7
4	(United States) David Pate	6	7	5
6	(United States) John Sadri	6	6
2	(United States) Tim Mayotte	4	3

Final
(United States) Tom Gullikson	6	7
6	(United States) John Sadri	3	6

=== Top half ===
First round
1	(United States) J Kriek	7	4	6
WC	(United States) J Grabb	5	6	2
(United Kingdom) S Shaw	3	5
(United States) S McCain	6	7
Q	(United States) R Knapp	4	6	2
(United States) To Gullikson	6	4	6
WC	(United States) R Seguso	4	6	5
8	(Australia) J Fitzgerald	6	3	7
4	(United States) D Pate	6	6
(India) V Amritraj	3	4
(United States) L Shiras	3	7	7
(Australia) P Doohan	6	5	5
Q	(United States) D Rostagno	6	6
(United States) M Mitchell	4	2
(United States) C Hooper	4	3^{r}
5	(United States) P Annacone	6	3

Second round
1	(United States) J Kriek	6	6
(United States) S McCain	3	4
(United States) To Gullikson	6	7
8	(Australia) J Fitzgerald	4	6
4	(United States) D Pate	6	6
(United States) L Shiras	2	2
Q	(United States) D Rostagno	4	4
5	(United States) P Annacone	6	6

Quarterfinals
1	(United States) J Kriek	6	6	3
(United States) To Gullikson	7	4	6
4	(United States) D Pate	3	7	6
5	(United States) P Annacone	6	5	3

Semifinals
(United States) To Gullikson	7	6	7
4	(United States) D Pate	6	7	5

=== Bottom half ===
First round
6	(United States) J Sadri	6	6
(United States) J Lapidus	1	1
(New Zealand) R Simpson	6	7
(South Africa) E Edwards	1	6
(Paraguay) F González	7	2	6
(South Africa) D Visser	6	6	1
(United States) D Cassidy	6	2
3	(United States) S Davis	7	6
7	(United States) S Giammalva Jr.	6	3	4
(United States) Ti Gullikson	3	6	6
WC	(Chile) R Acuña	5	2
(United States) M Flur	7	6
(United States) B Green	3	2
Q	(Canada) G Michibata	6	6
Q	(South Africa) C van Rensburg	4	4
2	(United States) T Mayotte	6	6

Second round
6	(United States) J Sadri	6	6
(New Zealand) R Simpson	4	4
(Paraguay) F González	6	1
3	(United States) S Davis	7	6
(United States) Ti Gullikson	6	3	4
(United States) M Flur	2	6	6
Q	(Canada) G Michibata	6	1	1
2	(United States) T Mayotte	3	6	6

Quarterfinals
6	(United States) J Sadri	6	7
3	(United States) S Davis	3	5
(United States) M Flur	6	4	2
2	(United States) T Mayotte	3	6	6

Semifinals
6	(United States) J Sadri	6	6
2	(United States) T Mayotte	4	3
