= 1986 Virginia Slims of Newport =

- Date: July 14–20
- Edition: 8th
- Draw: 32S / 16D
- Prize money: $150,000
- Surface: Grass / outdoor
- Location: Newport, Rhode Island, U.S.
- Venue: Newport Casino

Champions

Singles
- (United States) Pam Shriver

Doubles
- (United States) Terry Holladay / (United States) Heather Ludloff
← 1985 ·	Virginia Slims of Newport	· 1987 →

The 1986 Virginia Slims of Newport was a women's tennis tournament played on outdoor grass courts at the Newport Casino in Newport, Rhode Island in the United States that was part of the 1986 Virginia Slims World Championship Series.It was the eighth edition of the tournament and was held from July 14 through July 20, 1986. First-seeded Pam Shriver won the singles title and earned $30,000 first-prize money.

== Finals ==
=== Singles ===
(United States) Pam Shriver defeated (United States) Lori McNeil 6–4, 6–2

- It was Shriver's 2nd singles title of the year and the 13th of her career.

=== Doubles ===
(United States) Terry Holladay / (United States) Heather Ludloff defeated (United States) Cammy MacGregor / (United States) Gretchen Magers 6–1, 6–7, 6–3

== See also ==
- 1986 Hall of Fame Tennis Championships – men's tournament
