= 1985 Hall of Fame Tennis Championships =

- Date: July 6–12
- Edition: 10th
- Category: Grand Prix
- Prize money: $100,000
- Surface: Grass / outdoor
- Location: Newport, Rhode Island, U.S.

Champions

Singles
- (United States) Tom Gullikson

Doubles
- (Australia) Peter Doohan / (United States) Sammy Giammalva Jr.
← 1984 ·	Hall of Fame Tennis Championships	· 1986 →

The 1985 Hall of Fame Tennis Championships (also known as the 1985 Volvo Tennis Hall of Fame Championships for sponsorship reasons) was a men's Grand Prix tennis tournament held in Newport, Rhode Island, USA. It was the 10th edition of the tournament and was held from July 6 through July 12, 1985. Unseeded Tom Gullikson won the singles title.

== Finals ==
=== Singles ===
(United States) Tom Gullikson defeated (United States) John Sadri 6–3, 7–5

- It was Gullikson's only singles title of his career.

=== Doubles ===
(Australia) Peter Doohan / (United States) Sammy Giammalva Jr. defeated (United States) Paul Annacone / (South Africa) Christo van Rensburg 6–1, 6–3

== See also ==
- 1985 Virginia Slims of Newport
