= 1987 Schenectady Open =

Tennis tournament

- Date: July 20–27
- Edition: 1st
- Category: Grand Prix
- Draw: 32S / 16D
- Surface: Hard / outdoor
- Location: Schenectady, New York, U.S.

Champions

Singles
- (Peru) Jaime Yzaga

Doubles
- (United States) Gary Donnelly / (South Africa) Gary Muller
- Schenectady Open

The 1987 Schenectady Open was a men's tennis tournament played on outdoor hard courts that was part of the 1987 Nabisco Grand Prix. It was played at Schenectady, New York in the United States from July 20 through July 27, 1987. First-seeded Jaime Yzaga won the singles title.

== Finals ==
=== Singles ===
(Peru) Jaime Yzaga defeated (United States) Jim Pugh 0–6, 7–6, 6–1

- It was Yzaga's 1st title of the year and the 1st of his career.

=== Doubles ===
(United States) Gary Donnelly / (South Africa) Gary Muller defeated (United States) Brad Pearce / (United States) Jim Pugh 7–6, 6–2

- It was Donnelly's 2nd title of the year and the 7th of his career. It was Muller's only title of the year and the 1st of his career.
