= 1987 Transamerica Open =

- Date: September 28 – October 4
- Edition: 99th
- Category: Grand Prix
- Draw: 32S / 16D
- Prize money: $232,000
- Surface: Carpet / indoor
- Location: San Francisco, U.S.
- Venue: Cow Palace

Champions

Singles
- (Sweden) Peter Lundgren

Doubles
- (United States) Jim Grabb / (United States) Patrick McEnroe
- Pacific Coast Championships

The 1987 Transamerica Open, also known as the Pacific Coast Championships, was a men's tennis tournament played on indoor carpet courts at the Cow Palace in San Francisco, California in the United States. The event was part of the 1987 Nabisco Grand Prix circuit. It was the 99th edition of the tournament and was held from September 28 through October 4, 1987. Unseeded Peter Lundgren won the singles title.

== Finals ==
=== Singles ===
(Sweden) Peter Lundgren defeated (United States) Jim Pugh 6–1, 7–5

- It was Lundgren's 2nd singles title of the year and the 3rd of his career.

=== Doubles ===
(United States) Jim Grabb / (United States) Patrick McEnroe defeated (United States) Glenn Layendecker / (United States) Todd Witsken 6–2, 0–6, 6–4
