= 1987 Player's Canadian Open =

- Date: August 10–16 (men); August 17–23 (women)
- Edition: 98th
- Surface: Hard / outdoor
- Location: Montreal, Quebec, Canada (men); Toronto, Ontario, Canada (women)

Champions

Men's singles
- (Czechoslovakia) Ivan Lendl

Women's singles
- (United States) Pam Shriver

Men's doubles
- (Australia) Pat Cash / (Sweden) Stefan Edberg

Women's doubles
- (United States) Zina Garrison / (United States) Lori McNeil
- Canadian Open

The 1987 Player's International Canadian Open was a tennis tournament played on outdoor hard courts. The men's tournament was held at the du Maurier Stadium in Montreal, Quebec, in Canada and was part of the 1987 Nabisco Grand Prix while the women's tournament was held at the National Tennis Centre in Toronto, Ontario, and was part of the 1987 Virginia Slims World Championship Series. The men's tournament was held from August 10 through August 16, 1987, while the women's tournament was held from August 17 through August 23, 1987.

== Finals ==
=== Men's singles ===
(Czechoslovakia) Ivan Lendl defeated (Sweden) Stefan Edberg 6–4, 7–6

- It was Lendl's 5th title of the year and the 72nd of his career.

=== Women's singles ===
(United States) Pam Shriver defeated (United States) Zina Garrison 6–4, 6–1

- It was Shriver's 9th title of the year and the 99th of her career.

=== Men's doubles ===
(Australia) Pat Cash / (Sweden) Stefan Edberg defeated (Australia) Peter Doohan / (Australia) Laurie Warder 6–7, 6–3, 6–4

- It was Cash's 3rd title of the year and the 13th of his career. It was Edberg's 7th title of the year and the 25th of his career.

=== Women's doubles ===
(United States) Zina Garrison / (United States) Lori McNeil defeated (West Germany) Claudia Kohde-Kilsch / (Czechoslovakia) Helena Suková 6–1, 6–2

- It was Garrison's 3rd title of the year and the 9th of her career. It was McNeil's 3rd title of the year and the 9th of her career.
