= 1989 Hall of Fame Tennis Championships and the Virginia Slims of Newport =

1989 Hall of Fame Tennis Championships and Virginia Slims of Newport
- Date: July 10–16 (men); July 17–23 (women)
- Edition: 14th (men) / 11th (women)
- Surface: Grass
- Location: Newport, Rhode Island, US

Champions

Men's singles
- (United States) Jim Pugh

Women's singles
- (United States) Zina Garrison

Men's doubles
- (United States) Patrick Galbraith / (United States) Brian Garrow

Women's doubles
- (United States) Gigi Fernández / (United States) Lori McNeil
← 1988 ·	Hall of Fame Tennis Championships	· 1990 →
← 1988 ·	Virginia Slims of Newport	· 1990 →

The 1989 Hall of Fame Tennis Championships and the 1989 Virginia Slims of Newport were tennis tournaments played on grass courts at the International Tennis Hall of Fame in Newport, Rhode Island, in the United States that were part of the 1989 Nabisco Grand Prix and of the Category 3 tier of the 1989 WTA Tour. The men's tournament was held from July 10 through July 16, 1989, while the women's tournament was held from July 17 through July 23, 1989. Jim Pugh and Zina Garrison won the singles titles.

== Finals ==
=== Men's singles ===
(United States) Jim Pugh defeated (Sweden) Peter Lundgren 6–4, 4–6, 6–2

- It was Pugh's 5th title of the year and the 15th of his career.

=== Women's singles ===
(United States) Zina Garrison defeated (United States) Pam Shriver 6–0, 6–1

- It was Garrison's 4th title of the year and the 21st of her career.

=== Men's doubles ===
(United States) Patrick Galbraith / (United States) Brian Garrow defeated (United Kingdom) Neil Broad / (South Africa) Stefan Kruger 2–6, 7–5, 6–3

- It was Galbraith's only title of the year and the 1st of his career. It was Garrow's only title of the year and the 1st of his career.

=== Women's doubles ===
(United States) Gigi Fernández / (United States) Lori McNeil defeated (Australia) Elizabeth Smylie / (Australia) Wendy Turnbull 6–3, 6–7^{(5–7)}, 7–5

- It was Fernández's 1st title of the year and the 10th of her career. It was McNeil's 3rd title of the year and the 21st of her career.
