= 1985 Virginia Slims of Newport =

- Date: July 15–21
- Edition: 7th
- Draw: 32S / 16D
- Prize money: $150,000
- Surface: Grass / outdoor
- Location: Newport, Rhode Island, U.S.
- Venue: International Tennis Hall of Fame

Champions

Singles
- (United States) Chris Evert-Lloyd

Doubles
- (United States) Chris Evert-Lloyd / (Australia) Wendy Turnbull
← 1984 ·	Virginia Slims of Newport	· 1986 →

The 1985 Virginia Slims of Newport was a women's tennis tournament played on outdoor grass courts at the International Tennis Hall of Fame in Newport, Rhode Island in the United States that was part of the 1985 Virginia Slims World Championship Series.It was the seventh edition of the tournament and was held from July 15 through July 21, 1985. First-seeded Chris Evert-Lloyd won the singles title, her second at the event after 1974.

== Finals ==
=== Singles ===
(United States) Chris Evert-Lloyd defeated (United States) Pam Shriver 6–4, 6–1

- It was Evert-Lloyd's 6th singles title of the year and the 138th of her career.

=== Doubles ===
(United States) Chris Evert-Lloyd / (Australia) Wendy Turnbull defeated (United States) Pam Shriver / (Australia) Elizabeth Smylie 6–4, 7–6

== See also ==
- 1985 Hall of Fame Tennis Championships
