= Lisa Albano =

American tennis player (born 1970)

- Full name: Lisa Albano-Fu
- Country (sports): United States
- Born: March 24, 1970 (age 54)
- Prize money: $15,235

Singles
- Career record: 1 ITF
- Highest ranking: No. 366 (June 24, 1991)

Doubles
- Career record: 1 ITF
- Highest ranking: No. 412 (July 5, 1993)

Lisa Albano-Fu (born March 24, 1970) is an American former professional tennis player.

A native of Peabody, Massachusetts, Albano attended Pingree School and was a collegiate tennis player for UC Berkeley, where she earned four All-American selections. She was runner-up to Sandra Birch in the final of the 1991 NCAA championships and was named ITA Regional Player of the Year in 1992.

After college she competed briefly on the professional tour and had a best singles world ranking of 366, with main draw appearances at the Virginia Slims of Newport. She won both the singles and doubles titles of an ITF tournament in Freeport, Bahamas in 1992.

Albano, who is married with two sons, is a member of the California Athletics Hall of Fame and New England Tennis Hall of Fame. She lives in Andover, Massachusetts.

== ITF finals ==
=== Singles: 2 (1–1) ===
Result	No.	Date	Tournament	Surface	Opponent	Score
Loss	1.	Aug 1990	Roanoke, United States	Hard	(United States) Julie Shiflet	1–6, 2–6
Win	2.	Nov 1992	Freeport, Bahamas	Hard	(Colombia) Carmiña Giraldo	6–2, 6–4

=== Doubles: 3 (1–2) ===
Result	No.	Date	Tournament	Surface	Partner	Opponents	Score
Loss	1.	Jun 1989	Niceville, United States	Clay	(United States) Shawn Foltz	(United States) Alissa Finerman (United States) Stacey Schefflin	6–4, 2–6, 3–6
Win	2.	Nov 1992	Freeport, Bahamas	Hard	(Philippines) Jean Lozano	(Puerto Rico) Emilie Viqueira (Netherlands) Caroline Stassen	6–4, 6–4
Loss	3.	Jun 1993	Hilton Head, United States	Hard	(United States) Claire Sessions Bailey	(United States) Elly Hakami (United States) Pam Nelson	3–6, 2–6
