= Mike Lee (tennis) =

American tennis player

- Country (sports): United States
- Born: March 22, 1963 (age 63) Tucson, Arizona
- Height: 5 ft 10 in (178 cm)
- Prize money: $10,415

Singles
- Career record: 2–2
- Highest ranking: No. 405 (Jul 11, 1988)

Grand Slam singles results
- Wimbledon: Q1 (1987)

Doubles
- Career record: 2–4
- Highest ranking: No. 298 (Oct 5, 1987)

Grand Slam doubles results
- Wimbledon: Q2 (1987)

Mike Lee (born March 22, 1963) is an American former professional tennis player.

An Arizona state singles champion at Sabino High School in 1980, Lee went on to play collegiate tennis for the University of Arizona, before turning professional in 1984.

Lee's professional tennis career included an appearance in Wimbledon qualifying and a quarter-final run at the 1988 Hall of Fame Tennis Championships, which included a win over world number 32 Dan Goldie.

Two of Lee's sons have also won Arizona state titles.
