= Val Wilder =

American tennis player

- Full name: Vallis Wilder
- Country (sports): United States
- Born: June 8, 1959 (age 65); Hartford, Connecticut, U.S.
- Height: 6 ft 3 in (191 cm)
- Plays: Right-handed

Singles
- Career record: 4–9
- Highest ranking: No. 105 (July 7, 1986)

Grand Slam singles results
- Wimbledon: 1R (1986)
- US Open: 1R (1986)

Doubles
- Career record: 0–2
- Highest ranking: No. 427 (May 19, 1986)

Vallis Wilder (born June 8, 1959) is a former professional tennis player from the United States.

== Biography ==
Wilder, who grew up in Westfield, Massachusetts, began competing professionally in 1981.

A right-handed player, he reached his career best ranking of 105 in 1986, a year in which he had a win over John Fitzgerald en route to the quarter-finals of the Hall of Fame Tennis Championships in Newport and made his only two grand slam main draw appearances. At the 1986 Wimbledon Championships he was beaten by fifth seed Stefan Edberg in the opening round and also lost in the first round at the 1986 US Open, to Danie Visser.

For over 20 years he has played on the ITF seniors circuit, having started in 1994 in the 35 and over division.
