= 1988 Hall of Fame Tennis Championships and the Virginia Slims of Newport =

1988 Hall of Fame Tennis Championships and Virginia Slims of Newport
- Date: July 4–10 (men); July 11–17 (women)
- Edition: 13th (men) / 10th (women)
- Surface: Grass / outdoor
- Location: Newport, Rhode Island, US
- Venue: International Tennis Hall of Fame

Champions

Men's singles
- (Australia) Wally Masur

Women's singles
- (United States) Lori McNeil

Men's doubles
- (United States) Kelly Jones / (Sweden) Peter Lundgren

Women's doubles
- (South Africa) Rosalyn Fairbank / (United States) Barbara Potter
← 1987 ·	Hall of Fame Tennis Championships	· 1989 →
← 1987 ·	Virginia Slims of Newport	· 1989 →

The 1988 Hall of Fame Tennis Championships and the 1988 Virginia Slims of Newport were tennis tournaments played on grass courts at the International Tennis Hall of Fame in Newport, Rhode Island, in the United States that were part of the 1988 Nabisco Grand Prix and of the Category 3 tier of the 1988 WTA Tour. The men's tournament was held from July 4 through July 10, 1988, while the women's tournament was held from July 11 through July 17, 1988. Wally Masur and Lori McNeil won the singles title.

== Finals ==
=== Men's singles ===
(Australia) Wally Masur defeated (Australia) Brad Drewett 6–2, 6–1

- It was Masur's 1st title of the year and the 9th of his career.

=== Women's singles ===
(United States) Lori McNeil defeated (United States) Barbara Potter 6–4, 4–6, 6–3

- It was McNeil's 6th title of the year and the 16th of her career.

=== Men's doubles ===
(United States) Kelly Jones / (Sweden) Peter Lundgren defeated (United States) Scott Davis / (United States) Dan Goldie 6–3, 7–6

- It was Jones' only title of the year and the 2nd of his career. It was Lundgren's only title of the year and the 5th of his career.

=== Women's doubles ===
(South Africa) Rosalyn Fairbank / (United States) Barbara Potter defeated (United States) Gigi Fernández / (United States) Lori McNeil 6–4, 6–3

- It was Fairbank's 1st title of the year and the 16th of her career. It was Potter's 1st title of the year and the 22nd of her career.
