= Woody Hunt =

American tennis player (1966–2002)

- Full name: Forrest Hunt IV
- Country (sports): United States
- Born: December 3, 1966 Torrance, U.S.
- Died: December 21, 2002 (aged 36) Palos Verdes, U.S.
- Height: 5 ft 10 in (178 cm)
- Prize money: $11,474

Singles
- Career record: 2–2
- Highest ranking: No. 434 (May 14, 1990)

Doubles
- Career record: 0–2
- Highest ranking: No. 358 (Jan 28, 1991)

Forrest "Woody" Hunt (December 3, 1966 – December 21, 2002) was an American professional tennis player.

Hunt grew up in Southern California, attending South Torrance High School. He was runner-up to Jay Berger at the 1985 USTA 18s national championships and achieved a national ranking that year of fifth for his age group.

A three-time All-American at UC Berkeley, Hunt competed briefly on the professional tour and attained a best world ranking of 434. He featured in three singles main draws on the Grand Prix tennis circuit and registered two match wins, over Peter Fleming at the 1987 Transamerica Open and Éric Winogradsky at the 1989 Cincinnati Open. In 1991 he was picked as a practice player on the United States Davis Cup team for a tie against Spain in Newport, Rhode Island.

== Personal life ==
Hunt was seriously injured in a car accident in 1996 which left him with paralysis in his right arm. He also suffered with biopolar disorder and in 2002 committed suicide aged 36.

A USTA junior tennis tournament has been named in his honor.
