= 1987 Hall of Fame Tennis Championships =

- Date: 6–12 July 1987
- Edition: 12th
- Draw: 32S / 16D
- Prize money: $100,000
- Surface: Grass / outdoor
- Location: Newport, Rhode Island, U.S.
- Venue: International Tennis Hall of Fame

Champions

Singles
- (United States) Dan Goldie

Doubles
- (United States) Dan Goldie / (United States) Larry Scott
← 1986 ·	Hall of Fame Tennis Championships	· 1988 →

The 1987 Hall of Fame Tennis Championships, also known as the 1987 Volvo Tennis Hall of Fame Championships for sponsorship reasons, was a men's tennis tournament played on outdoor grass courts and part of the Nabisco Grand Prix circuit. held. It was the 12th edition of the tournament and was held at the International Tennis Hall of Fame in Newport, Rhode Island, United States from July 6 through July 11, 1987. Unseeded Dan Goldie won the singles title and $20,000 first prize money.

== Finals ==
=== Singles ===
(United States) Dan Goldie defeated (United States) Sammy Giammalva Jr. 6–7^{(5–7)}, 6–4, 6–4

- It was Goldie's first singles title of his career.

=== Doubles ===
(United States) Dan Goldie / (United States) Larry Scott defeated (United States) Chip Hooper / (United States) Mike Leach 6–3, 4–6, 6–4

== See also ==
- 1987 Virginia Slims of Newport – women's tournament
