= Dan Goldie =

American tennis player

- Country (sports): United States
- Residence: Palo Alto, California, United States
- Born: October 3, 1963 (age 62) Sioux City, Iowa, United States
- Height: 6 ft 2 in (1.88 m)
- Turned pro: 1983
- Retired: 1991
- Plays: Right-handed (one-handed backhand)
- Prize money: $682,952
- Official website: DC Financial Advisors

Singles
- Career record: 122–117
- Career titles: 2
- Highest ranking: No. 27 (April 17, 1989)

Grand Slam singles results
- Australian Open: 4R (1987)
- French Open: 1R (1989, 1990)
- Wimbledon: QF (1989)
- US Open: 4R (1986)

Doubles
- Career record: 55–54
- Career titles: 2
- Highest ranking: No. 40 (March 6, 1989)
Medal record
Representing United States
Summer Universiade
Silver medal – second place	1983 Edmonton	Men's singles

Daniel C. Goldie (born October 3, 1963) is a former tennis player from the United States who won 2 singles (1987, Newport and 1988, Seoul) and 2 doubles titles (1986, Wellington and 1987, Newport). The right-hander reached the quarterfinals of Wimbledon in 1989 where he defeated Kelly Evernden, Jimmy Connors, Wally Masur and Slobodan Živojinović before losing to Ivan Lendl. He achieved a career-high ATP singles ranking of World No. 27 in April 1989. Before turning pro, Goldie played tennis for Stanford University, where he won the 1986 National Singles Championship before graduating with a degree in Economics.

In 2011, Goldie co-authored The Investment Answer, a #1 New York Times bestselling book for individual investors. Goldie is currently President of Dan Goldie Financial Services LLC, an independent financial advisor located in Palo Alto, California. He has been recognized by Barron's as one of the top 100 independent financial advisors in the U.S. He currently resides in Palo Alto, California.

== Career finals ==
=== Singles (2 titles) ===
Result	W/L	Date	Tournament	Surface	Opponent	Score
Win	1–0	Jul 1987	Newport, United States	Grass	(United States) Sammy Giammalva Jr.	6–7^{(5–7)}, 6–4, 6–4
Win	2–0	Apr 1988	Seoul, South Korea	Hard	(United Kingdom) Andrew Castle	6–3, 6–7^{(5–7)}, 6–0

=== Doubles (2 titles, 2 runner-ups) ===
Result	W/L	Date	Tournament	Surface	Partner	Opponents	Score
Win	1–0	Jul 1987	Newport, United States	Grass	(United States) Larry Scott	(United States) Chip Hooper (United States) Mike Leach	6–3, 4–6, 6–4
Loss	1–1	Oct 1987	Scottsdale, United States	Hard	(United States) Mel Purcell	(United States) Rick Leach (United States) Jim Pugh	3–6, 2–6
Win	2–1	Jan 1988	Wellington, New Zealand	Hard	(United States) Rick Leach	(Australia) Broderick Dyke (Canada) Glenn Michibata	6–2, 6–3
Loss	2–2	Jul 1988	Newport, United States	Grass	(United States) Scott Davis	(United States) Kelly Jones (Sweden) Peter Lundgren	3–6, 6–7
