= 1987 Virginia Slims of Newport =

- Date: July 13–19
- Edition: 9th
- Category: Virginia Slims (Cat 3)
- Draw: 32S / 16D
- Prize money: $150,000
- Surface: Grass / outdoor
- Location: Newport, Rhode Island, U.S.
- Venue: Newport Casino

Champions

Singles
- (United States) Pam Shriver

Doubles
- (United States) Gigi Fernández / (United States) Lori McNeil
← 1986 ·	Virginia Slims of Newport	· 1988 →

The 1987 Virginia Slims of Newport was a women's tennis tournament played on outdoor grass courts at the Newport Casino in Newport, Rhode Island in the United States that was part of the 1987 Virginia Slims World Championship Series. It was the ninth edition of the tournament and was held from July 13 through July 19, 1987. First-seeded Pam Shriver won her second consecutive singles title at the event and earned $30,000 first-prize money.

== Finals ==
=== Singles ===
(United States) Pam Shriver defeated (United States) Wendy White 6–2, 6–4

- It was Shriver's 2nd singles title of the year and the 15th of her career.

=== Doubles ===
(United States) Gigi Fernández / (United States) Lori McNeil defeated (United Kingdom) Anne Hobbs / (United States) Kathy Jordan 7–6^{(7–5)}, 7–5

== See also ==
- 1987 Hall of Fame Tennis Championships – men's tournament
