= Peter Lundgren =

Swedish tennis player and coach (1965–2024)

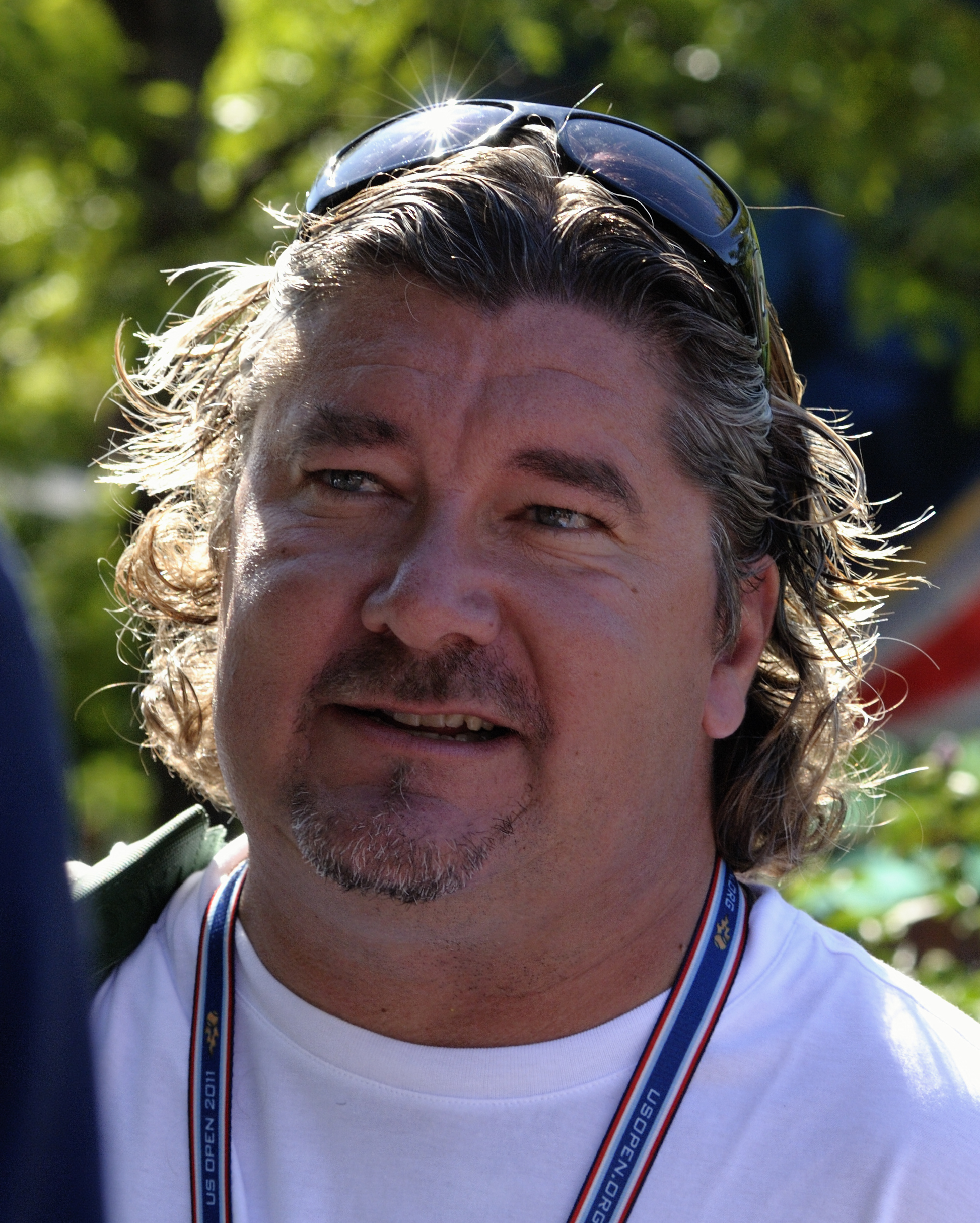
- Lundgren in 2011
- Country (sports): Sweden
- Residence: Hunnebostrand, Sweden; Monte Carlo, Monaco
- Born: 29 January 1965
- Died: 22 August 2024 (aged 59)
- Height: 1.85 m (6 ft 1 in)
- Turned pro: 1983
- Retired: 1995
- Plays: Right-handed (two-handed backhand)
- Prize money: $1,130,516

Singles
- Career record: 119–136
- Career titles: 3
- Highest ranking: No. 25 (16 December 1985)

Grand Slam singles results
- Australian Open: 2R (1988, 1991)
- French Open: 2R (1991)
- Wimbledon: 4R (1989)
- US Open: 2R (1985, 1987, 1989, 1990)

Doubles
- Career record: 100–134
- Career titles: 3
- Highest ranking: No. 36 (26 November 1990)

Grand Slam doubles results
- Australian Open: F (1988)
- French Open: 3R (1992)
- Wimbledon: 2R (1988, 1990)
- US Open: 2R (1987

Grand Slam mixed doubles results
- Australian Open: 1R (1989)

Hans Peter Lundgren (Swedish pronunciation: [pêːtɛr ˈlɵ̂nːɡreːn]; 29 January 1965 – 22 August 2024) was a Swedish professional tennis player and tennis coach. He preferred playing indoors, hardcourt and on grass to clay.

== Playing career ==
Lundgren was one of the second generation of Swedish players along with Mats Wilander, Stefan Edberg, Joakim Nyström, Anders Järryd, Henrik Sundström, Hans Simonsson, and Kent Carlsson that followed after the success of Björn Borg. He left Sundsvall as an 18-year-old and moved to Stockholm, to further his tennis career.

In 1984 Lundgren finished the year ranked at 265. At the end of the 1985 season, Lundgren jumped up 234 places on ranking list to finish at No. 31. In the process he won his first title in Cologne as a qualifier defeating Wojtek Fibak, Goran Prpić, Jeremy Bates, and Tim Wilkison before defeating Ramesh Krishnan in the final. After the title win he was hailed as "the new Björn Borg", in reference to his talent and the long hair that bore resemblance to Borg and that he had trained with him as well. Lundgren's best ranking was 25th in the world, but at the time he was only the seventh best Swede behind Mats Wilander, Stefan Edberg, Anders Järryd, Joakim Nyström, Henrik Sundström, and Jan Gunnarsson.

This was the golden age of Swedish tennis in which Lundgren said "We had at most 14 players in the top 100. (Don't forget the size of the Swedish population, it makes it even better this achievement)". Lundgren while managing to have some big wins over Ivan Lendl, Mats Wilander, Michael Chang, Jim Courier, Thomas Muster, and Pete Sampras, was not able to achieve consistency and he said himself that "I was a little up and down. Sometimes I could lose motivation and then suddenly get thrashed against lower ranked players." He played his last match on tour against Karol Kučera in Copenhagen Open and retired at 30 years of age and then went into coaching.

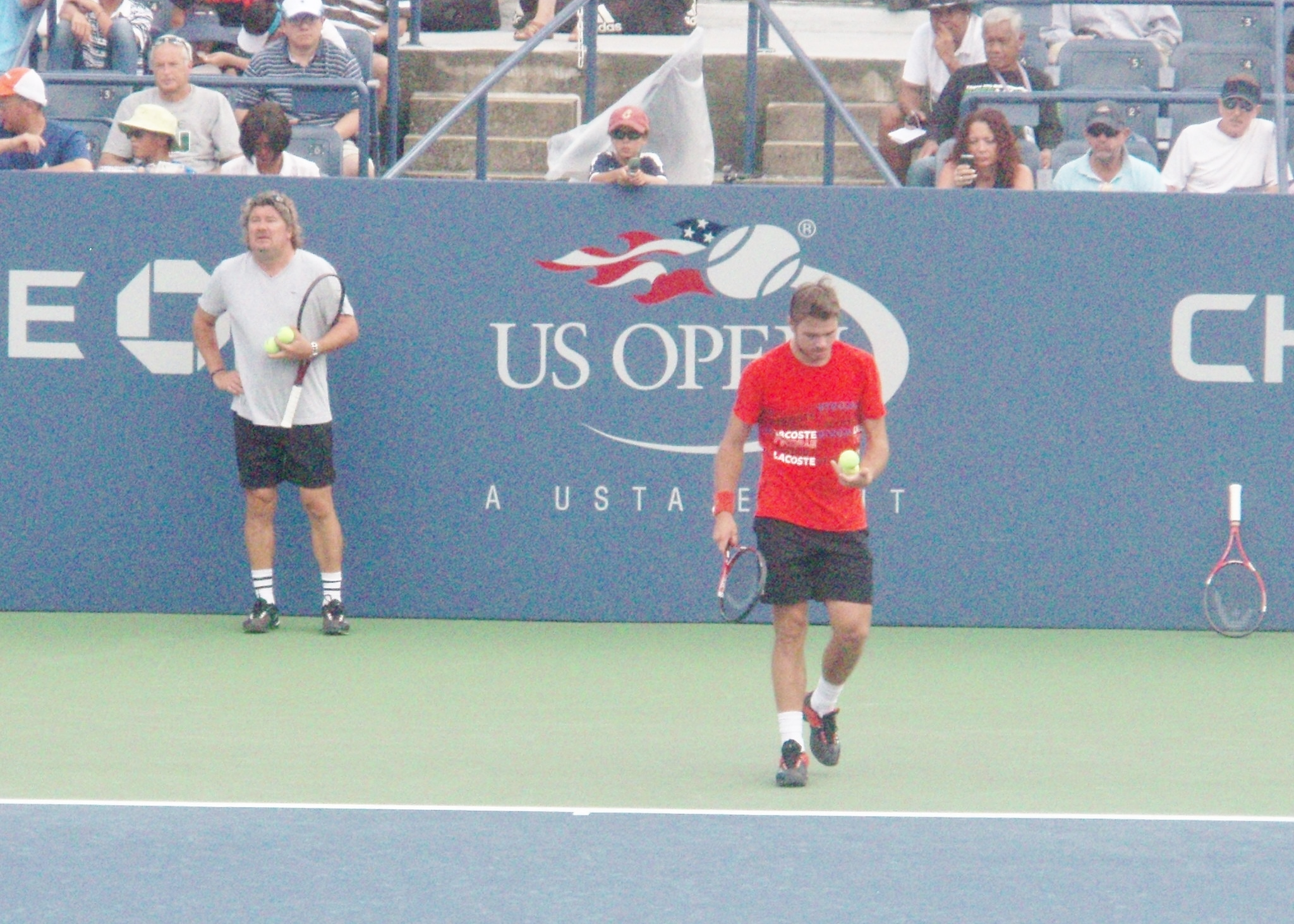
Lundgren coaching Stanislas Wawrinka (2011)

== Coaching ==
Lundgren first made a name for himself as a coach when he took Marcelo Ríos into the top 10 and then they split ways, when Lundgren said that "he needed a psychologist more than a coach". After that he was working for the Swiss Tennis Federation helping out with the juniors. He replaced Peter Carter as coach for Roger Federer and they worked together from 2000 to the end of 2003 before splitting.

Lundgren then took over coaching Marat Safin and guided him to the 2005 Australian Open championship and worked with him until August 2006. In September 2006, it was announced that he would be helping out the British Davis Cup team for the next two years.

He was given a "leave of absence" from the LTA in June 2007. In 2008 Lundgren took some time away from his job, because his father was ill, though he later expressed interest to return to work with British tennis. During 2008 he started coaching the Cypriot tennis player Marcos Baghdatis. In February 2009 Lundgren started coaching Grigor Dimitrov from Bulgaria. He then coached Stanislas Wawrinka. In September 2011 Lundgren and Wawrinka split. Lundgren then went on to teach Vicht virtual tennis coaching in Houston, Texas. In March 2014 Lundgren began to coach Daniela Hantuchová.

== Death ==
Lundgren suffered from type 2 diabetes, and one of his feet was amputated in 2023. Lundgren died in August 2024, at the age of 59.

== Career statistics ==
=== Grand Slam tournament finals ===
==== Doubles: 1 (loss) ====
Result	Year	Championship	Surface	Partner	Opponents	Score
Loss	1988	Australian Open	Hard	(United Kingdom) Jeremy Bates	(United States) Rick Leach (United States) Jim Pugh	3–6, 2–6, 3–6

=== ATP Tour finals ===
==== Singles: 6 (3 titles, 3 runner-ups) ====
Legend Grand Slam tournaments ATP Masters Series ATP Championship Series (0–1) ATP World Series (3–2)	Finals by surface Hard (2–2) Clay (0–0) Grass (0–1) Carpet (1–0)	Finals by setting Outdoors (1–2) Indoors (2–1)

Result	W–L	Date	Tournament	Tier	Surface	Opponent	Score
Win	1–0	Oct 1985	Cologne, West Germany	Grand Prix	Hard	(India) Ramesh Krishnan	6–3, 6–2
Win	2–0	Aug 1987	Rye Brook, United States	Grand Prix	Hard	(United States) John Ross	6–7^{(4–7)}, 7–5, 6–3
Win	3–0	Oct 1987	San Francisco, United States	Grand Prix	Carpet	(United States) Jim Pugh	6–1, 7–5
Loss	3–1	Nov 1988	Stockholm, Sweden	Grand Prix	Hard	(West Germany) Boris Becker	4–6, 1–6, 1–6
Loss	3–2	Jul 1989	Newport, United States	Grand Prix	Grass	(United States) Jim Pugh	4–6, 6–4, 2–6
Loss	3–3	Aug 1990	Indianapolis, United States	Championship Series	Hard	(West Germany) Boris Becker	3–6, 4–6

==== Doubles: 10 (3 titles, 7 runner-ups) ====
Legend Grand Slam tournaments (0–1) ATP Masters Series (0–1) ATP Championship Series (1–0) ATP World Series (2–5)	Finals by surface Hard (2–7) Clay (0–0) Grass (1–0) Carpet (0–0)	Finals by setting Outdoors (2–3) Indoors (1–4)

Result	W–L	Date	Tournament	Tier	Surface	Partner	Opponents	Score
Loss	0–1	Oct 1985	Cologne, West Germany	Grand Prix	Hard	(Sweden) Jan Gunnarsson	(Austria) Alex Antonitsch (Netherlands) Michiel Schapers	4–6, 5–7
Loss	0–2	Apr 1986	Cologne, West Germany	Grand Prix	Hard	(Sweden) Jan Gunnarsson	(New Zealand) Kelly Evernden (United States) Chip Hooper	4–6, 7–6, 3–6
Win	1–2	Oct 1986	Tel Aviv, Israel	Grand Prix	Hard	(United States) John Letts	(South Africa) Christo Steyn (South Africa) Danie Visser	6–3, 3–6, 6–3
Loss	1–3	Jan 1988	Melbourne, Australia	Grand Slam	Hard	(United Kingdom) Jeremy Bates	(United States) Rick Leach (United States) Jim Pugh	3–6, 2–6, 3–6
Loss	1–4	Feb 1988	Memphis, United States	Grand Prix	Hard	(Sweden) Mikael Pernfors	(United States) Kevin Curren (United States) David Pate	2–6, 2–6
Win	2–4	Jul 1988	Newport, United States	Grand Prix	Grass	(United States) Kelly Jones	(United States) Scott Davis (United States) Dan Goldie	6–3, 7–6
Loss	2–5	Oct 1988	Basel, Switzerland	Grand Prix	Hard	(United Kingdom) Jeremy Bates	(Switzerland) Jakob Hlasek (United States) Tomáš Šmíd	3–6, 1–6
Loss	2–6	Jul 1990	Toronto, Canada	Masters Series	Hard	(Australia) Broderick Dyke	(United States) Paul Annacone (United States) David Wheaton	1–6, 6–7
Loss	2–7	Aug 1990	Los Angeles, United States	World Series	Hard	(Kenya) Paul Wekesa	(United States) Scott Davis (United States) David Pate	6–3, 1–6, 3–6
Win	3–7	Oct 1990	Sydney, Australia	Championship Series	Hard	(Australia) Broderick Dyke	(Sweden) Stefan Edberg (Czechoslovakia) Ivan Lendl	6–2, 6–4

=== ATP Challenger and ITF Futures finals ===
==== Doubles (1–0) ====
Legend ATP Challenger (1–0) ITF Futures (0–0)	Finals by surface Hard (1–0) Grass (0–0)

Result	W–L	Date	Tournament	Tier	Surface	Partner	Opponents	Score
Win	1–0	May 1992	Taipei, Taiwan	Challenger	Hard	(Australia) Broderick Dyke	(Australia) Neil Borwick (Australia) Andrew Kratzmann	7–6, 7–5

=== Performance timelines ===
Key
W	F	SF	QF	#R	RR	Q#	DNQ	A	NH

(W) winner; (F) finalist; (SF) semifinalist; (QF) quarterfinalist; (#R) rounds 4, 3, 2, 1; (RR) round-robin stage; (Q#) qualification round; (DNQ) did not qualify; (A) absent; (NH) not held; (SR) strike rate (events won / competed); (W–L) win–loss record.

==== Singles ====
Tournament	1985	1986	1987	1988	1989	1990	1991	1992	1993	1994	SR	W–L	Win %
Grand Slam tournaments
Australian Open	A	A	A	2R	1R	A	2R	1R	A	A	0 / 4	2–4	33%
French Open	A	1R	1R	1R	1R	1R	2R	A	Q1	A	0 / 6	1–6	14%
Wimbledon	A	2R	1R	2R	4R	1R	2R	Q1	Q1	Q3	0 / 6	6–6	50%
US Open	2R	1R	2R	1R	2R	2R	1R	Q1	Q2	Q1	0 / 7	4–7	36%
Win–loss	1–1	1–3	1–3	2–4	4–4	1–3	3–4	0–1	0–0	0–0	0 / 23	13–23	36%
ATP Masters Series
Indian Wells	A	A	A	1R	A	A	1R	A	A	A	0 / 2	0–2	0%
Miami	A	3R	2R	2R	1R	2R	1R	A	Q1	Q1	0 / 6	5–6	45%
Monte Carlo	A	1R	A	1R	A	A	1R	A	A	A	0 / 3	0–3	0%
Rome	A	1R	A	A	A	A	1R	A	A	A	0 / 2	0–2	0%
Canada	A	A	QF	3R	A	1R	2R	A	1R	Q2	0 / 5	6–5	55%
Cincinnati	A	1R	QF	2R	1R	A	1R	Q3	Q2	A	0 / 5	5–5	50%
Win–loss	0–0	2–4	7–3	4–5	0–2	1–2	2–6	0–0	0–1	0–0	0 / 23	16–23	41%

==== Doubles ====
Tournament	1986	1987	1988	1989	1990	1991	1992	1993	SR	W–L	Win %
Grand Slam tournaments
Australian Open	A	A	F	2R	A	2R	1R	A	0 / 4	7–4	64%
French Open	1R	1R	1R	1R	A	1R	3R	A	0 / 6	2–6	25%
Wimbledon	1R	1R	2R	1R	2R	1R	1R	Q2	0 / 7	2–7	22%
US Open	1R	2R	1R	1R	1R	1R	1R	A	0 / 7	1–7	13%
Win–loss	0–3	1–3	6–4	1–4	1–2	1–4	2–4	0–0	0 / 24	12–24	33%
ATP Masters Series
Indian Wells	A	1R	2R	1R	A	2R	A	A	0 / 4	2–4	33%
Miami	1R	1R	3R	1R	A	2R	A	Q1	0 / 5	2–5	29%
Monte Carlo	2R	2R	1R	A	1R	2R	A	A	0 / 5	3–5	38%
Rome	1R	A	A	1R	A	QF	1R	A	0 / 4	2–4	33%
Canada	A	1R	1R	A	F	1R	A	A	0 / 4	4–4	50%
Cincinnati	1R	2R	1R	2R	2R	1R	Q1	A	0 / 6	3–6	33%
Paris	A	A	A	A	1R	A	A	A	0 / 1	0–1	0%
Win–loss	1–4	2–5	3–5	1–4	5–4	4–6	0–1	0–0	0 / 29	16–29	36%

Awards
Preceded by Mikael Pernfors	ATP Most Improved Player; 1987	Succeeded by Andre Agassi
