= 1986 Hall of Fame Tennis Championships =

- Date: July 7–13, 1986
- Edition: 11th
- Category: Grand Prix
- Draw: 32S/16D
- Prize money: $100,000
- Surface: Grass / outdoor
- Location: Newport, Rhode Island, U.S.
- Venue: International Tennis Hall of Fame

Champions

Singles
- (United States) Bill Scanlon

Doubles
- (India) Vijay Amritraj / (United States) Tim Wilkison
- Hall of Fame Tennis Championships

The 1986 Hall of Fame Tennis Championships, also known as the 1986 Volvo Tennis Hall of Fame Championships for sponsorship reasons, was a men's tennis tournament played on outdoor grass courts and part of the Nabisco Grand Prix circuit. held. It was the 11th edition of the tournament and was held at the International Tennis Hall of Fame in Newport, Rhode Island, USA from July 7 through July 13, 1986. Unseeded Bill Scanlon won the singles title and $20,000 first prize money.

== Finals ==
=== Singles ===
(United States) Bill Scanlon defeated (United States) Tim Wilkison 7–5, 6–4

- It was Scanlon's 1st singles title of the year and the 6th and last of his career.

=== Doubles ===
(India) Vijay Amritraj / (United States) Tim Wilkison defeated (South Africa) Eddie Edwards / (Paraguay) Francisco González 4–6, 7–5, 7–6

== See also ==
- 1986 Virginia Slims of Newport – women's tournament
