= Larry Scott (sports administrator) =

American tennis player and sports administrator

- Country (sports): United States
- Born: November 21, 1964 (age 61) New York City, New York
- Height: 6 ft 2 in (1.88 m)
- Plays: Right-handed
- Prize money: US$ 69,740

Singles
- Career record: 1–18
- Career titles: 0
- Highest ranking: No. 210 (November 30, 1987)

Grand Slam singles results
- Australian Open: 1R (1988)
- Wimbledon: 2R (1987)

Doubles
- Career record: 20–39
- Career titles: 1
- Highest ranking: No. 69 (March 30, 1987)

Grand Slam doubles results
- Australian Open: 1R (1988)
- French Open: 1R (1987)
- Wimbledon: 2R (1988)
- US Open: 2R (1987)

Larry Scott (born November 21, 1964) is an American sports administrator and former professional tennis player who was the commissioner of the collegiate Pac-12 Conference until 2021. He has also been chairman and CEO of the Women's Tennis Association and president and COO of ATP Properties, a division of the Association of Tennis Professionals.

== Early life and education ==
Scott was born in New York City. A speaker of French, Scott graduated in 1986 from Harvard University with a B.A. in European history. While at Harvard, he was captain of the tennis team and named an All-American.

== Professional tennis player ==
As a professional tennis player, Scott reached a career-high singles ranking of No. 210 and doubles ranking of No. 69 in the world. He also won one doubles title.

== ATP Properties ==
Following his retirement as a pro tennis player, Scott spent a decade as president and COO of ATP Properties, a division of the Association of Tennis Professionals.

During his time in ATP management, Scott put together a lucrative partnership between the ATP and the Swiss marketing company ISL.

== Women's Tennis Association ==
Scott became chairman and CEO of the Women's Tennis Association on April 16, 2003.

While at the WTA, Scott oversaw a fivefold increase in sponsorship money and a 250% increase in total revenue. This included the largest sponsorship in the history of women's athletics, a six-year, $88-million deal with Sony Ericsson. Scott also successfully formed sponsorships with Whirlpool, Gatorade, and Bed Bath & Beyond.

Prize money increased 40% during Scott's time with the WTA. Scott was an advocate for equal pay. Before Scott's tenure, two of the four Grand Slam tournaments, Wimbledon and the French Open, awarded less prize money to women than to men. Scott successfully lobbied for the increase of women's prize money at Wimbledon and the French Open to be equal to that of men's prize money, so that men's and women's prize money are now equal at all Grand Slam events.

Among Scott's other achievements was the securing of a contract with Eurosport to broadcast WTA tennis in 54 countries. Scott also oversaw new investments of $710 million in tennis stadiums.

== Pac-12 Conference ==
On March 24, 2009, Scott announced that he was resigning as chairman and CEO of the Women's Tennis Association in order to take a new position as the commissioner of the collegiate Pacific-10 Conference on July 1, 2009. He succeeded the retiring Tom Hansen.

During his tenure, the conference expanded to include Utah and Colorado in 2011 and added a football championship game. Those additions helped secure a 12-year, $3 billion media rights deal with Fox and ESPN that set the standard for college sports at the time. The Pac-12 also agreed to equal revenue sharing for the first time under the new deal. On January 20, 2021, the Pac-12 Conference announced that Scott's tenure as commissioner would end on June 30. Scott received criticism during his tenure for overspending, including his controversial decision to shift the Pac-12 offices into a multi-story building in San Francisco that cost conference members a total of $92 million in rent over 11 years – a rate significantly higher than that of other Power 5 conference headquarters.

Commentators assess Scott's tenure as a failure that led to the effective dissolution of the conference under successor George Kliavkoff two years later. A major issue was the decision to launch the Pac-12 Network without a broadcast partner, and then fail to negotiate carriage rights with DirecTV. Access issues bedeviled the network throughout Scott's tenure, reducing the visibility of the conference.
