= Virginia Slims of Newport =

Defunct tennis tournament
- Event name: Virginia Slims of Newport (1971–74, 1984–90); Virginia Slims Hall of Fame Classic (1983); Virginia Slims/Hall of Fame Invitational (1991-98)
- Tour: WTA Tour
- Founded: 1971
- Abolished: 1998
- Editions: 20
- Location: Newport, Rhode Island, U.S.
- Venue: International Tennis Hall of Fame
- Surface: Grass

The Virginia Slims of Newport is a defunct WTA Tour affiliated women's tennis tournament played from 1971 to 1990; from 1991-1998 it was the Virginia Slims/Hall of Fame Invitational. It was held at the International Tennis Hall of Fame in Newport, Rhode Island in the United States and played on outdoor grass courts.

== Finals ==
=== Singles ===
Year	Champions	Runners-up	Score
1971	(Australia) Kerry Reid	(France) Françoise Dürr	6–3, 6–7^{(3–5)}, 7–6^{(5–4)}
1972	(Australia) Margaret Court	(United States) Billie Jean King	6–4, 6–1
1973	(Australia) Margaret Court	(United States) Julie Heldman	6–3, 6–2
1974	(United States) Chris Evert	(United States) Betsy Nagelsen	6–4, 6–3
1975 - 1982	Not held		
1983	(United States) Alycia Moulton	(United States) Kim Jones-Shaefer	6–3, 6–2
1984	(United States) Martina Navratilova	(United States) Gigi Fernández	6–3, 7–6^{(7–3)}
1985	(United States) Chris Evert-Lloyd	(United States) Pam Shriver	6–4, 6–1
1986	(United States) Pam Shriver	(United States) Lori McNeil	6–4, 6–2
1987	(United States) Pam Shriver	(United States) Wendy White	6–2, 6–4
1988	(United States) Lori McNeil	(United States) Barbara Potter	6–4, 4–6, 6–3
1989	(United States) Zina Garrison	(United States) Pam Shriver	6–0, 6–1
1990	(Spain) Arantxa Sánchez Vicario	(United Kingdom) Jo Durie	7–6, 4–6, 7–5
From 1991-1998 known as the Virginia Slims/Hall of Fame Invitational
1991	(South Africa) Ros Fairbank-Nideffer	(United States) Mary Joe Fernández	1-6, 7-6, 6-0
1992	(United States) Mary Joe Fernández	(United States) Zina Garrison	6-4, 6-4
1993	(South Africa) Ros Fairbank-Nideffer	(United States) Zina Garrison	6-4, 3-6, 6-4
1994	(United States) Mary Joe Fernández	(United States) Pam Shriver	6-4, 6-4
1995	(United States) Lindsay Davenport	(United States) Mary Joe Fernández	6-4, 7-6^{(7–2)}
1996	(United States) Pam Shriver	(Australia) Elizabeth Smylie	unknown
1997	unknown	unknown	unknown
1998	Event Not Held (Doubles Exhibition Only)		

=== Doubles ===
Year	Champions	Runners-up	Score
1971	(Australia) Judy Dalton (France) Françoise Dürr	(Australia) Kerry Harris (Australia) Kerry Reid	6–2, 6–1
1972	(Australia) Margaret Court (Australia) Lesley Hunt	(United States) Rosemary Casals (United States) Billie Jean King	6–2, 6–2
1973	(France) Françoise Dürr (Netherlands) Betty Stöve	(United States) Janet Newberry (United States) Pam Teeguarden	6–4, 6–3
1974	(United Kingdom) Lesley Charles (United Kingdom) Sue Mappin	(France) Gail Chanfreau (United States) Julie Heldman	6–2, 7–5
1975 - 1982	Not held		
1983	(United States) Barbara Potter (United States) Pam Shriver	(United States) Barbara Jordan (Australia) Elizabeth Sayers	6–3, 6–1
1984	(United States) Alycia Moulton (United States) Paula Smith	(United States) Lea Antonoplis (South Africa) Beverly Mould	7–5, 7–6
1985	(United States) Chris Evert-Lloyd (Australia) Wendy Turnbull	(United States) Pam Shriver (Australia) Elizabeth Smylie	6–4, 7–6
1986	(United States) Terry Holladay (United States) Heather Ludloff	(United States) Cammy MacGregor (United States) Gretchen Magers	6–1, 6–7, 6–3
1987	(United States) Gigi Fernández (United States) Lori McNeil	(United Kingdom) Anne Hobbs (United States) Kathy Jordan	7–6^{(7–5)}, 7–5
1988	(South Africa) Rosalyn Fairbank (United States) Barbara Potter	(United States) Gigi Fernández (United States) Lori McNeil	6–4, 6–3
1989	(United States) Gigi Fernández (United States) Lori McNeil	(Australia) Elizabeth Smylie (Australia) Wendy Turnbull	6–3, 6–7, 7–5
1990	(South Africa) Lise Gregory (United States) Gretchen Magers	(United States) Patty Fendick (United States) Anne Smith	7–6, 6–1
From 1991-1998 known as the Virginia Slims/Hall of Fame Invitational
1991	(South Africa) Rosalyn Fairbank (United States) Pam Shriver	unknown unknown	unknown
1992	unknown unknown	unknown unknown	unknown
1993	(United States) Chanda Rubin (Georgia (country)) Leila Meskhi	(South Africa) Rosalyn Fairbank (United States) Betsy Nagelsen	3-2 (7-4) (exhibition)
1994	unknown unknown	unknown unknown	unknown
1995	unknown unknown	unknown unknown	unknown
1996	unknown unknown	unknown unknown	unknown
1997	unknown unknown	unknown unknown	unknown
1998	unknown unknown	unknown unknown	unknown

== See also ==
- Hall of Fame Open – men's tournament
