= 2011 Campbell's Hall of Fame Tennis Championships – Singles Qualifying =

This article displays the qualifying draw of the 2011 Campbell's Hall of Fame Tennis Championships.

== Players ==
=== Seeds ===
1. (Australia) Greg Jones (Moved into Main Draw)
2. (United States) Rajeev Ram (qualifying competition)
3. (Germany) Andre Begemann (qualifying competition)
4. (United States) Greg Ouellette (qualifying competition)
5. (United Kingdom) Richard Bloomfield (qualified)
6. (Lithuania) Laurynas Grigelis (second round)
7. (United States) Michael Yani (qualified)
8. (United Kingdom) Alex Bogdanovic (qualified)

=== Qualifiers ===
1. (United Kingdom) Alex Bogdanovic
2. (United Kingdom) Richard Bloomfield
3. (United States) Michael Yani
4. (Chinese Taipei) Wang Yeu-tzuoo

== Qualifying draw ==
=== First qualifier ===
First Round
(Australia) Mark Verryth | 6 | 1 | 6
(Serbia) Vladimir Obradović | 3 | 6 | 1
(United States) Devin Britton | 7 | 6^{1} | 7^{7}
(Italy) Andrea Agazzi | 5 | 7^{7} | 6^{2}
(United States) Sekou Bangoura | 3 | 4
8 | (United Kingdom) Alex Bogdanovic | 6 | 6

Second Round
BYE
(Australia) Mark Verryth
(United States) Devin Britton | 6 | 5 | 3
8 | (United Kingdom) Alex Bogdanovic | 3 | 7 | 6

Qualifying Competition
(Australia) Mark Verryth | 4 | 5
8 | (United Kingdom) Alex Bogdanovic | 6 | 7

=== Second qualifier ===
| First Round | | | | | Second Round | | | | | Qualifying Competition |
| | | | | | 2 | (United States) Rajeev Ram | 2 | 6 | 6 |
| | (United Kingdom) Ken Skupski | 6 | 4 | 7^{7} | | (United Kingdom) Ken Skupski | 6 | 1 | 1 |
| WC | (Germany) Michael Kohlmann | 3 | 6 | 6^{3} | | | | | | 2 | (United States) Rajeev Ram | 7^{7} | 6^{2} | 3 |
| | (Canada) Pierre-Ludovic Duclos | 6 | 6 | | | | | | | 5 | (United Kingdom) Richard Bloomfield | 6^{4} | 7^{7} | 6 |
| | (United States) Andrew Dzulynsky | 2 | 2 | | | (Canada) Pierre-Ludovic Duclos | 3 | 2 |
| | | | | | 5 | (United Kingdom) Richard Bloomfield | 6 | 6 |

=== Third qualifier ===
| First Round | | | | | Second Round | | | | Qualifying Competition |
| | | | | | 3 | (Germany) Andre Begemann | 6 | 6 |
| | (France) Antoine Benneteau | 6 | 6^{5} | 6^{4} | | (United States) Michael Shabaz | 1 | 4 |
| | (United States) Michael Shabaz | 4 | 7^{7} | 7^{7} | | | | | 3 | (Germany) Andre Begemann | 4 | 6^{4} |
| WC | (United States) Henry Steer | 1 | 0 | | | | | | 7 | (United States) Michael Yani | 6 | 7^{7} |
| | (Germany) Frank Moser | 6 | 6 | | | (Germany) Frank Moser | 6^{6} | 4 |
| | | | | | 7 | (United States) Michael Yani | 7^{8} | 6 |

=== Fourth qualifier ===
| First Round | | | | Second Round | | | | | Qualifying Competition |
| | | | | 4 | (United States) Greg Ouellette | 6 | 6 |
| WC | (United States) Kiril Kasyanov | 4 | 4 | | (United States) Scott Lipsky | 4 | 1 |
| | (United States) Scott Lipsky | 6 | 6 | | | | | | 4 | (United States) Greg Ouellette | 2 | 2 |
| | (Chinese Taipei) Wang Yeu-tzuoo | 6 | 6 | | | | | | | (Chinese Taipei) Wang Yeu-tzuoo | 6 | 6 |
| | (United States) John Valenti | 0 | 0 | | (Chinese Taipei) Wang Yeu-tzuoo | 6 | 2 | 6 |
| | | | | 6 | (Lithuania) Laurynas Grigelis | 4 | 6 | 2 |
