= 2010 Hall of Fame Tennis Championships – Singles =

Singles
- 2010 Hall of Fame Tennis Championships

Final
- Champion: (United States) Mardy Fish
- Runner-up: (Belgium) Olivier Rochus
- Score: 5–7, 6–3, 6–4

Details
- Draw: 32 (4 Q / 3 WC )
- Seeds: 8

Events
Singles	Doubles
- Hall of Fame Tennis Championships

Rajeev Ram was the defending champion but he lost to qualifier Raven Klaasen in the second round.
Mardy Fish defeated Olivier Rochus in the final 5–7, 6–3, 6–4.

== Seeds ==
1. (United States) Sam Querrey (second round)
2. (Colombia) Santiago Giraldo (second round)
3. (Colombia) Alejandro Falla (first round)
4. (Belgium) Olivier Rochus (final)
5. (United States) Mardy Fish (champion)
6. (Slovakia) Karol Beck (first round)
7. (United States) Rajeev Ram (second round)
8. (United States) Taylor Dent (first round)

== Draw ==
Key

- Q = Qualifier
- WC = Wild card
- LL = Lucky loser
- Alt = Alternate
- ITF = ITF entry
- PR = Protected ranking
- SR = Special ranking
- SE = Special exempt
- JE = Junior exempt
- JR = Junior Accelerator Programme entrant
- CO = College Accelerator Programme entrant
- NG = Next Gen Accelerator Program entrant
- w/o = Walkover
- r = Retired
- d = Defaulted

=== Finals ===
Semifinals
(Argentina) Brian Dabul	3	2
4	(Belgium) Olivier Rochus	6	6
5	(United States) Mardy Fish	7^{7}	6
Q	(United Kingdom) Richard Bloomfield	6^{5}	4

Final
4	(Belgium) Olivier Rochus	7	3	4
5	(United States) Mardy Fish	5	6	6

=== Top half ===
First round
1	(United States) S Querrey	6	6
(United States) J Levine	3	3
(Germany) B Phau	6^{3}	7^{9}	4
(Jamaica) D Brown	7^{7}	6^{7}	6
(Argentina) B Dabul	5	6	0
(Australia) C Ball	7	2	1^{r}
(Japan) G Soeda	6	3	6
8	(United States) T Dent	4	6	4
4	(Belgium) O Rochus	7^{7}	6
(France) É Roger-Vasselin	6^{2}	4
Q	(Ukraine) S Bubka	7^{7}	6
(Australia) C Guccione	6^{0}	4
(Serbia) I Bozoljac	6^{5}	6^{0}
Q	(South Africa) R Klaasen	7^{7}	7^{7}
(Spain) I Navarro	3	6^{3}
7	(United States) R Ram	6	7^{7}

Second round
1	(United States) S Querrey	4	3
(Jamaica) D Brown	6	6
(Argentina) B Dabul	7	6
(Japan) G Soeda	5	2
4	(Belgium) O Rochus	6	6
Q	(Ukraine) S Bubka	3	3
Q	(South Africa) R Klaasen	5	6	7^{7}
7	(United States) R Ram	7	1	6^{3}

Quarterfinals
(Jamaica) D Brown	4	4
(Argentina) B Dabul	6	6
4	(Belgium) O Rochus	6	6
Q	(South Africa) R Klaasen	1	3

Semifinals
(Argentina) B Dabul	3	2
4	(Belgium) O Rochus	6	6

=== Bottom half ===
First round
5	(United States) M Fish	6	6
(United States) M Russell	1	2
(United States) K Kim	4	3
(India) S Devvarman	6	6
(France) M Gicquel	5	4
(Canada) F Dancevic	7	6
WC	(France) N Mahut	6	1	6
3	(Colombia) A Falla	3	6	3
6	(Slovakia) K Beck	1	2
WC	(United States) R Harrison	6	6
(Spain) S Ventura	3	6	5
WC	(United States) D Kudla	6	3	7
(Belgium) C Rochus	6^{1}	3
Q	(United Kingdom) R Bloomfield	7^{7}	6
Q	(Austria) A Peya	6^{1}	6	4
2	(Colombia) S Giraldo	7^{7}	1	6

Second round
5	(United States) M Fish	6	6
(India) S Devvarman	2	0
(Canada) F Dancevic	7^{7}	6
WC	(France) N Mahut	6^{5}	3
WC	(United States) R Harrison	7	7^{7}
WC	(United States) D Kudla	5	6^{5}
Q	(United Kingdom) R Bloomfield	6	7^{7}
2	(Colombia) S Giraldo	3	6^{5}

Quarterfinals
5	(United States) M Fish	6^{6}	6	6
(Canada) F Dancevic	7^{8}	4	4
WC	(United States) R Harrison	7	6^{3}	5
Q	(United Kingdom) R Bloomfield	5	7^{7}	7

Semifinals
5	(United States) M Fish	7^{7}	6
Q	(United Kingdom) R Bloomfield	6^{5}	4
