= 2011 Campbell's Hall of Fame Tennis Championships – Doubles =

Doubles
- 2011 Campbell's Hall of Fame Tennis Championships

Final
- Champions: (Australia) Matthew Ebden (United States) Ryan Harrison
- Runners-up: (Sweden) Johan Brunström (Canada) Adil Shamasdin
- Score: 4–6, 6–3, [10–5]

Events
Singles	Doubles
← 2010 ·	Campbell's Hall of Fame Tennis Championships	· 2012 →

Carsten Ball and Chris Guccione were the defending champions, but decided not to participate.

Matthew Ebden and Ryan Harrison defeated Johan Brunström and Adil Shamasdin in the final of this tournament.

== Seeds ==
1. (United States) Scott Lipsky / (United States) Rajeev Ram (quarterfinals)
2. (Brazil) Marcelo Melo / (Brazil) André Sá (semifinals)
3. (United States) James Cerretani / (Germany) Philipp Marx (first round)
4. (Sweden) Johan Brunström / (Canada) Adil Shamasdin (final)

== Draw ==
=== Key ===
- Q = Qualifier
- WC = Wild card
- LL = Lucky loser
- Alt = Alternate
- SE = Special exempt
- PR = Protected ranking
- ITF = ITF entry
- JE = Junior exempt
- w/o = Walkover
- r = Retired
- d = Defaulted
- SR = Special ranking

=== Draw ===
First round
1	(United States) S Lipsky (United States) R Ram	6	7^{7}
(United Kingdom) J Delgado (United Kingdom) J Marray	2	6^{4}
(Philippines) TC Huey (United States) R Sweeting	2	7^{7}	[6]
WC	(Australia) M Ebden (United States) R Harrison	6	6^{4}	[10]
3	(United States) J Cerretani (Germany) P Marx	5	2
(Croatia) I Karlović (Germany) F Moser	7	6
WC	(Australia) A Fisher (Australia) J Kerr	1	6	[11]
(France) A Clément (France) N Mahut	6	3	[9]
(Germany) D Gremelmayr (Germany) T Kamke	1	6	[10]
(Slovakia) K Beck (Israel) D Sela	6	2	[8]
(Germany) M Bachinger (Germany) M Kohlmann	4	1
4	(Sweden) J Brunström (Canada) A Shamasdin	6	6
(Bulgaria) G Dimitrov (United Kingdom) K Skupski	4	4
(Belgium) R Bemelmans (Belgium) O Rochus	6	6
(United States) A Bogomolov Jr. (Germany) D Brown	7^{7}	6^{5}	[6]
2	(Brazil) M Melo (Brazil) A Sá	6^{1}	7^{7}	[10]

Quarterfinals
1	(United States) S Lipsky (United States) R Ram	3	6	[7]
WC	(Australia) M Ebden (United States) R Harrison	6	3	[10]
(Croatia) I Karlović (Germany) F Moser	7^{7}	4	[10]
WC	(Australia) A Fisher (Australia) J Kerr	6^{3}	6	[4]
(Germany) D Gremelmayr (Germany) T Kamke	2	0
4	(Sweden) J Brunström (Canada) A Shamasdin	6	6
(Belgium) R Bemelmans (Belgium) O Rochus	6	3	[8]
2	(Brazil) M Melo (Brazil) A Sá	4	6	[10]

Semifinals
WC	(Australia) M Ebden (United States) R Harrison	6	7
(Croatia) I Karlović (Germany) F Moser	3	5
4	(Sweden) J Brunström (Canada) A Shamasdin	6	3	[10]
2	(Brazil) M Melo (Brazil) A Sá	4	6	[5]

Final
WC	(Australia) M Ebden (United States) R Harrison	4	6	[10]
4	(Sweden) J Brunström (Canada) A Shamasdin	6	3	[5]
