= 2010 Campbell's Hall of Fame Tennis Championships =

Tennis tournament

2010 Hall of Fame Tennis Championships
- Date: July 5–11
- Edition: 35th
- Category: ATP World Tour 250
- Draw: 32S / 16D
- Prize money: $442,500
- Surface: Grass / outdoors
- Location: Newport, Rhode Island, United States
- Venue: International Tennis Hall of Fame

Champions

Singles
- (United States) Mardy Fish

Doubles
- (Australia) Carsten Ball / (Australia) Chris Guccione
- Hall of Fame Tennis Championships

The 2010 Hall of Fame Tennis Championships (also known as the Campbell's Hall of Fame Tennis Championships for sponsorship reasons) was a men's tennis tournament played on outdoor grass courts. It was the 35th edition of the Hall of Fame Tennis Championships, and was part of the ATP World Tour 250 series of the 2010 ATP World Tour. It took place at the International Tennis Hall of Fame in Newport, Rhode Island, United States, from July 5 through July 11, 2010. Fifth-seeded Mardy Fish won the singles title.

== Entrants ==
=== Seeds ===
Player	Nationality	Ranking*	Seeding
Sam Querrey	United States	21	1
Santiago Giraldo	Colombia	54	2
Alejandro Falla	Colombia	60	3
Olivier Rochus	Belgium	68	4
Mardy Fish	United States	73	5
Karol Beck	Slovakia	88	6
Rajeev Ram	United States	93	7
Taylor Dent	United States	97	8

- Seedings are based on the rankings of June 21, 2010.

=== Other entrants ===
The following players received wildcards into the singles main draw

- (United States) Ryan Harrison
- (United States) Denis Kudla
- (France) Nicolas Mahut

The following players received entry from the qualifying draw:

- (United Kingdom) Richard Bloomfield
- (Ukraine) Sergei Bubka
- (South Africa) Raven Klaasen
- (Austria) Alexander Peya

== Finals ==
=== Singles ===
(United States) Mardy Fish defeated (Belgium) Olivier Rochus 5–7, 6–3, 6–4

- It was Fish's first title of the year and 4th of his career.

=== Doubles ===
(Australia) Carsten Ball / (Australia) Chris Guccione defeated (Mexico) Santiago González / (United States) Travis Rettenmaier 6–3, 6–4
