= 2010 Hall of Fame Tennis Championships – Doubles =

Doubles
- 2010 Hall of Fame Tennis Championships

Final
- Champions: (Australia) Carsten Ball (Australia) Chris Guccione
- Runners-up: (Mexico) Santiago González (United States) Travis Rettenmaier
- Score: 6–3, 6–4

Events
Singles	Doubles
← 2009 ·	Hall of Fame Tennis Championships	· 2011 →

Jordan Kerr and Rajeev Ram were the defending champions, but chose not to compete with each other.
Kerr chose to compete with Ross Hutchins, but they got out in the first round to Jonathan Erlich and Scott Lipsky.
Ram chose to compete with Jean-Julien Rojer. However, they lost in the first round to Marc Gicquel and Santiago Ventura.
Unseeded Carsten Ball and Chris Guccione won in the final 6–3, 6–4, against Santiago González and Travis Rettenmaier.

== Seeds ==
1. (United States) Mardy Fish / (United States) Sam Querrey (first round)
2. (United States) Rajeev Ram / (Netherlands Antilles) Jean-Julien Rojer (first round)
3. (United Kingdom) Ross Hutchins / (Australia) Jordan Kerr (first round)
4. (Mexico) Santiago González / (United States) Travis Rettenmaier (final)

== Draw ==
=== Key ===
- Q = Qualifier
- WC = Wild card
- LL = Lucky loser
- Alt = Alternate
- SE = Special exempt
- PR = Protected ranking
- ITF = ITF entry
- JE = Junior exempt
- w/o = Walkover
- r = Retired
- d = Defaulted
- SR = Special ranking

=== Draw ===
First round
1	(United States) M Fish (United States) S Querrey	7^{7}	6^{9}	[11]
(Australia) C Ball (Australia) C Guccione	6^{3}	7^{11}	[13]
(Colombia) S Giraldo (Belgium) O Rochus	6^{13}	2
(Poland) T Bednarek (Jamaica) D Brown	7^{15}	6
3	(United Kingdom) R Hutchins (Australia) J Kerr	3	2
(Israel) J Erlich (United States) S Lipsky	6	6
(United Kingdom) J Marray (United Kingdom) J Murray	7^{7}	7^{7}
WC	(United States) J Cerretani (Canada) A Shamasdin	6^{3}	6^{5}
(Colombia) A Falla (Argentina) S Prieto	7^{7}	6^{4}	[5]
(France) N Mahut (France) É Roger-Vasselin	6^{2}	7^{7}	[10]
WC	(Australia) S Huss (Australia) J Sirianni	6^{3}	4
4	(Mexico) S González (United States) T Rettenmaier	7^{7}	6
(Slovakia) K Beck (Netherlands) R Wassen	4	4
(Germany) M Kohlmann (Austria) A Peya	6	6
(France) M Gicquel (Spain) S Ventura	3	7^{7}	[11]
2	(United States) R Ram (Netherlands Antilles) J-J Rojer	6	6^{5}	[9]

Quarterfinals
(Australia) C Ball (Australia) C Guccione	6	6
(Poland) T Bednarek (Jamaica) D Brown	3	4
(Israel) J Erlich (United States) S Lipsky	7^{7}	6
(United Kingdom) J Marray (United Kingdom) J Murray	6^{3}	3
(France) N Mahut (France) É Roger-Vasselin	6	6^{1}	[4]
4	(Mexico) S González (United States) T Rettenmaier	3	7^{7}	[10]
(Germany) M Kohlmann (Austria) A Peya	4	4
(France) M Gicquel (Spain) S Ventura	6	6

Semifinals
(Australia) C Ball (Australia) C Guccione	7	7^{7}
(Israel) J Erlich (United States) S Lipsky	5	6^{3}
4	(Mexico) S González (United States) T Rettenmaier	6	7
(France) M Gicquel (Spain) S Ventura	3	5

Final
(Australia) C Ball (Australia) C Guccione	6	6
4	(Mexico) S González (United States) T Rettenmaier	3	4
