= 2011 Campbell's Hall of Fame Tennis Championships – Singles =

Singles
- 2011 Campbell's Hall of Fame Tennis Championships

Final
- Champion: (United States) John Isner
- Runner-up: (Belgium) Olivier Rochus
- Score: 6–3, 7–6^{(8–6)}

Details
- Draw: 32 (4 Q / 3 WC )
- Seeds: 8

Events
Singles	Doubles
- Hall of Fame Tennis Championships

Mardy Fish was the defending champion, but decided to participate in the Davis Cup instead.

No. 1 seed John Isner won the tournament, beating Belgian Olivier Rochus in the final, 6–3, 7–6^{(8–6)}. In doing so, Isner became the first top seed to ever win the tournament, breaking the "Casino Curse."

== Seeds ==
1. (United States) John Isner (champion)
2. (Bulgaria) Grigor Dimitrov (second round)
3. (Russia) Igor Kunitsyn (first round)
4. (United States) Ryan Sweeting (first round)
5. (United States) Alex Bogomolov Jr. (quarterfinals)
6. (Belgium) Olivier Rochus (final)
7. (Germany) Michael Berrer (first round)
8. (Germany) Tobias Kamke (semifinals)

== Draw ==
Key

- Q = Qualifier
- WC = Wild card
- LL = Lucky loser
- Alt = Alternate
- ITF = ITF entry
- PR = Protected ranking
- SR = Special ranking
- SE = Special exempt
- JE = Junior exempt
- JR = Junior Accelerator Programme entrant
- CO = College Accelerator Programme entrant
- NG = Next Gen Accelerator Program entrant
- w/o = Walkover
- r = Retired
- d = Defaulted

=== Finals ===
Semifinals
1/WC	(United States) John Isner	7	7^{7}
8	(Germany) Tobias Kamke	5	6^{4}
6	(Belgium) Olivier Rochus	6	6
Q	(United States) Michael Yani	2	4

Final
1/WC	(United States) John Isner	6	7^{8}
6	(Belgium) Olivier Rochus	3	6^{6}

=== Top half ===
First round
1/WC	(United States) J Isner	6	6
(Slovakia) K Beck	3	2
(United States) R Harrison	4	1
(France) A Clément	6	6
(Germany) D Gremelmayr	4	2
(Belgium) R Bemelmans	6	6
(Germany) M Zverev	6	3	1
5	(United States) A Bogomolov Jr.	4	6	6
3	(Russia) I Kunitsyn	6	5	2
Q	(Chinese Taipei) J Wang	4	7	6
(France) É Roger-Vasselin	6	6
Q	(United Kingdom) R Bloomfield	4	0
(Chile) P Capdeville	2	1
(United States) D Young	6	6
Q	(United Kingdom) A Bogdanovic	6^{3}	3
8	(Germany) T Kamke	7^{7}	6

Second round
1/WC	(United States) J Isner	7^{8}	6
(France) A Clément	6^{6}	4
(Belgium) R Bemelmans	6	0	1
5	(United States) A Bogomolov Jr.	2	6	6
Q	(Chinese Taipei) J Wang	5	4
(France) É Roger-Vasselin	7	6
(United States) D Young	6^{3}	4
8	(Germany) T Kamke	7^{7}	6

Quarterfinals
1/WC	(United States) J Isner	7^{7}	6
5	(United States) A Bogomolov Jr.	6^{5}	4
(France) É Roger-Vasselin	6	1	3
8	(Germany) T Kamke	3	6	6

Semifinals
1/WC	(United States) J Isner	7	7^{7}
8	(Germany) T Kamke	5	6^{4}

=== Bottom half ===
First round
6	(Belgium) O Rochus	6	3	6
(Australia) G Jones	4	6	3
(France) N Mahut	6	6
(Argentina) S Decoud	1	0
(Germany) D Brown	6^{7}	7^{7}	1
(Germany) M Bachinger	7^{9}	6^{5}	6
(Australia) M Ebden	6	6
4	(United States) R Sweeting	4	2
7	(Germany) M Berrer	6^{9}	4
WC	(Germany) T Haas	7^{11}	6
(Israel) D Sela	6^{5}	3
Q	(United States) M Yani	7^{7}	6
WC	(United States) D Kudla	7^{7}	4	6
(Croatia) I Karlović	6^{4}	6	4
(Argentina) B Dabul	2	4
2	(Bulgaria) G Dimitrov	6	6

Second round
6	(Belgium) O Rochus	6	7^{7}
(France) N Mahut	4	6^{3}
(Germany) M Bachinger	6	4	4
(Australia) M Ebden	2	6	6
WC	(Germany) T Haas	2^{r}
Q	(United States) M Yani	5
WC	(United States) D Kudla	6	6
2	(Bulgaria) G Dimitrov	1	4

Quarterfinals
6	(Belgium) O Rochus	7^{7}	6
(Australia) M Ebden	6^{5}	3
Q	(United States) M Yani	6	6^{5}	7
WC	(United States) D Kudla	3	7^{7}	5

Semifinals
6	(Belgium) O Rochus	6	6
Q	(United States) M Yani	2	4
