= 2009 Campbell's Hall of Fame Tennis Championships =

2009 Hall of Fame Tennis Championships
- Date: July 6–12
- Edition: 34th
- Category: ATP World Tour 250 series
- Surface: Grass / outdoor
- Location: Newport, Rhode Island, US

Champions

Singles
- (United States) Rajeev Ram

Doubles
- (Australia) Jordan Kerr / (United States) Rajeev Ram
- Hall of Fame Tennis Championships

The 2009 Hall of Fame Tennis Championships (also known as the Campbell's Hall of Fame Tennis Championships for sponsorship reasons) is a tennis tournament played on outdoor grass courts. It was the 34th edition of the Hall of Fame Tennis Championships, and is part of the ATP World Tour 250 series of the 2009 ATP Tour. It took place at the International Tennis Hall of Fame in Newport, Rhode Island, United States, from July 6 through July 12, 2009.

The singles field is led by Mardy Fish, Fabrice Santoro.

== Finals ==
=== Singles ===
(United States) Rajeev Ram defeated (United States) Sam Querrey, 6–7^{(3–7)}, 7–5, 6–3

- It was Ram's first career title.

=== Doubles ===
(Australia) Jordan Kerr / (United States) Rajeev Ram defeated (Germany) Michael Kohlmann / (Netherlands) Rogier Wassen, 6–7^{(6–8)}, 7–6^{(9–7)}, [10–6]
