= 2009 Hall of Fame Tennis Championships – Doubles =

Doubles
- 2009 Hall of Fame Tennis Championships

Final
- Champions: (Australia) Jordan Kerr (United States) Rajeev Ram
- Runners-up: (Germany) Michael Kohlmann (Netherlands) Rogier Wassen
- Score: 6–7^{(6–8)}, 7–6^{(9–7)}, [10–6]

Events
Singles	Doubles
← 2008 ·	Hall of Fame Tennis Championships	· 2010 →

Mardy Fish and John Isner were the defending champions, but neither participated this year.

Jordan Kerr and Rajeev Ram won the title, defeating Michael Kohlmann and Rogier Wassen 6–7^{(6–8)}, 7–6^{(9–7)}, [10–6] in the final.

== Seeds ==
1. (South Africa) Rik de Voest / (Australia) Ashley Fisher (first round)
2. (Germany) Philipp Petzschner / (Austria) Alexander Peya (semifinals)
3. (Australia) Jordan Kerr / (United States) Rajeev Ram (champions)
4. (United States) Eric Butorac / (United States) Scott Lipsky (quarterfinals)

== Draw ==
=== Key ===
- Q = Qualifier
- WC = Wild card
- LL = Lucky loser
- Alt = Alternate
- SE = Special exempt
- PR = Protected ranking
- ITF = ITF entry
- JE = Junior exempt
- w/o = Walkover
- r = Retired
- d = Defaulted
- SR = Special ranking

=== Draw ===
First round
1	(South Africa) R de Voest (Australia) A Fisher	6^{2}	2
(Argentina) S Prieto (Argentina) H Zeballos	7^{7}	6
WC	(United States) J Gimelstob (United States) J Levine	6	6
WC	(United States) T Dent (United States) D Martin	3	2
3	(Australia) J Kerr (United States) R Ram	2	6	[11]
(France) A Clément (Belgium) O Rochus	6	4	[9]
(United States) J Cerretani (Ukraine) S Stakhovsky	4	4
(France) N Mahut (France) F Santoro	6	6
(Germany) F Moser (Pakistan) A-u-H Qureshi	6^{6}	4
(Germany) M Kohlmann (Netherlands) R Wassen	7^{8}	6
(United States) K Kim (Thailand) D Udomchoke	6^{1}	2
4	(United States) E Butorac (United States) S Lipsky	7^{7}	6
(Germany) B Becker (Germany) D Brands	6	6
ALT	(Italy) F Cipolla (Brazil) M Daniel	1	4
(Spain) R Ramírez Hidalgo (Spain) S Ventura	5	2
2	(Germany) P Petzschner (Austria) A Peya	7	6

Quarterfinals
(Argentina) S Prieto (Argentina) H Zeballos	w/o
WC	(United States) J Gimelstob (United States) J Levine
3	(Australia) J Kerr (United States) R Ram	6	6
(France) N Mahut (France) F Santoro	2	2
(Germany) M Kohlmann (Netherlands) R Wassen	7^{7}	4	[11]
4	(United States) E Butorac (United States) S Lipsky	6^{4}	6	[9]
(Germany) B Becker (Germany) D Brands	6	3	[12]
2	(Germany) P Petzschner (Austria) A Peya	2	6	[14]

Semifinals
(Argentina) S Prieto (Argentina) H Zeballos	6^{5}	6^{6}
3	(Australia) J Kerr (United States) R Ram	7^{7}	7^{8}
(Germany) M Kohlmann (Netherlands) R Wassen	6	7^{7}
2	(Germany) P Petzschner (Austria) A Peya	2	6^{5}

Final
3	(Australia) J Kerr (United States) R Ram	6^{6}	7^{9}	[10]
(Germany) M Kohlmann (Netherlands) R Wassen	7^{8}	6^{7}	[6]
