= 2009 Hall of Fame Tennis Championships – Singles =

Singles
- 2009 Hall of Fame Tennis Championships

Final
- Champion: (United States) Rajeev Ram
- Runner-up: (United States) Sam Querrey
- Score: 6–7^{(3–7)}, 7–5, 6–3

Events
| Singles | Doubles |
- Hall of Fame Tennis Championships

Fabrice Santoro was the defending champion, but lost in the semifinals to Sam Querrey.

Rajeev Ram won the title as a lucky loser, defeating Querrey 6–7^{(3–7)}, 7–5, 6–3 in the final.

== Seeds ==
1. (United States) Mardy Fish (withdrew because of the Davis Cup)
2. (France) Fabrice Santoro (semifinals)
3. (United States) Sam Querrey (final)
4. (Germany) Benjamin Becker (first round)
5. (France) Arnaud Clément (first round)
6. (Germany) Philipp Petzschner (second round)
7. (United States) Kevin Kim (quarterfinals)
8. (Ukraine) Sergiy Stakhovsky (second round)

== Draw ==
Key

- Q = Qualifier
- WC = Wild card
- LL = Lucky loser
- Alt = Alternate
- ITF = ITF entry
- PR = Protected ranking
- SR = Special ranking
- SE = Special exempt
- JE = Junior exempt
- JR = Junior Accelerator Programme entrant
- CO = College Accelerator Programme entrant
- NG = Next Gen Accelerator Program entrant
- w/o = Walkover
- r = Retired
- d = Defaulted

=== Finals ===
Semifinals
LL | (United States) Rajeev Ram | 6 | 6
(Belgium) Olivier Rochus | 3 | 4
3 | (United States) Sam Querrey | 6 | 7^{7}
2 | (France) Fabrice Santoro | 3 | 6^{2}

Final
LL | (United States) Rajeev Ram | 6^{3} | 7 | 6
3 | (United States) Sam Querrey | 7^{7} | 5 | 3

=== Top half ===
First round
LL | (United States) R Ram | 6 | 7
Q | (Colombia) A Falla | 4 | 5
Q | (Brazil) R Mello | 5 | 6 | 3
Q | (Australia) S Groth | 7 | 3 | 6
(Australia) C Guccione | 6^{2} | 6^{2}
(United States) J Levine | 7^{7} | 7^{7}
(Argentina) H Zeballos | 4 | 7^{7} | 2
6 | (Germany) P Petzschner | 6 | 6^{4} | 6
4 | (Germany) B Becker | 6^{5} | 6 | 5
(United States) B Evans | 7^{7} | 3 | 7
(United States) R Ginepri | 6 | 1 | 6
(Spain) S Ventura | 2 | 6 | 4
(Belgium) O Rochus | 6 | 4 | 6
Q | (Austria) A Peya | 2 | 6 | 4
(Canada) F Dancevic | 6^{9} | 6 | 5
8 | (Ukraine) S Stakhovsky | 7^{11} | 2 | 7

Second round
LL | (United States) R Ram | 6 | 6
Q | (Australia) S Groth | 4 | 2
(United States) J Levine | 7^{7} | 6
6 | (Germany) P Petzschner | 6^{3} | 2
(United States) B Evans | 6 | 6
(United States) R Ginepri | 3 | 4
(Belgium) O Rochus | 5 | 7^{7} | 6
8 | (Ukraine) S Stakhovsky | 7 | 6^{2} | 3

Quarterfinals
LL | (United States) R Ram | 5 | 6 | 7^{7}
(United States) J Levine | 7 | 2 | 6^{3}
(United States) B Evans | 4 | 4
(Belgium) O Rochus | 6 | 6

Semifinals
LL | (United States) R Ram | 6 | 6
(Belgium) O Rochus | 3 | 4

=== Bottom half ===
First round
7 | (United States) K Kim | 4 | 6
WC | (France) S Grosjean | 6 | 3 | r
(United States) V Spadea | 0 | 4
(Germany) D Brands | 6 | 6
WC | (India) P Amritraj | 6 | 6
(Thailand) D Udomchoke | 1 | 4
(Spain) R Ramírez Hidalgo | 3 | 2
3 | (United States) S Querrey | 6 | 6
5 | (France) A Clément | 6 | 3 | 4
(United States) A Bogomolov Jr. | 1 | 6 | 6
(United States) A Delic | 4 | 4
(France) N Mahut | 6 | 6
(Brazil) M Daniel | 2 | 1
WC | (United States) T Dent | 6 | 6
(Italy) F Cipolla | 3 | 5
2 | (France) F Santoro | 6 | 7

Second round
7 | (United States) K Kim | 4 | 7^{7} | 6
(Germany) D Brands | 6 | 6^{5} | 4
WC | (India) P Amritraj | 7^{9} | 3 | 2
3 | (United States) S Querrey | 6^{7} | 6 | 6
(United States) A Bogomolov Jr. | 2 | 2
(France) N Mahut | 6 | 6
WC | (United States) T Dent | 6^{5} | 4
2 | (France) F Santoro | 7^{7} | 6

Quarterfinals
7 | (United States) K Kim | 3 | 4
3 | (United States) S Querrey | 6 | 6
(France) N Mahut | 4 | 4
2 | (France) F Santoro | 6 | 6

Semifinals
3 | (United States) S Querrey | 6 | 7^{7}
2 | (France) F Santoro | 3 | 6^{2}

== Qualifying ==
=== Seeds ===
1. (United States) Rajeev Ram (qualifying competition, lucky loser)
2. (Germany) Simon Stadler (qualifying competition)
3. (Japan) Go Soeda (qualifying competition)
4. (Italy) Andrea Stoppini (qualifying competition)
5. (Colombia) Alejandro Falla (qualified)
6. (United Kingdom) Josh Goodall (second round)
7. (Brazil) Ricardo Mello (qualified)
8. (Austria) Alexander Peya (qualified)

=== Qualifiers ===
1. (Brazil) Ricardo Mello
2. (Australia) Sam Groth
3. (Austria) Alexander Peya
4. (Colombia) Alejandro Falla

=== Lucky loser ===
1. (United States) Rajeev Ram

=== Draw ===
==== First qualifier ====
First round
WC | (Jamaica) Damar Johnson | 4 | 3
(United States) Nick Lindahl | 6 | 6
(South Africa) Rik de Voest | 4 | 7^{7} | 6
(Germany) Michael Kohlmann | 6 | 6^{2} | 2
WC | (United States) Christo Schultz | 2 | 2
7 | (Brazil) Ricardo Mello | 6 | 6

Second round
1 | (United States) Rajeev Ram | 7^{7} | 6
(United States) Nick Lindahl | 6^{4} | 3
(South Africa) Rik de Voest | 6^{5} | 5
7 | (Brazil) Ricardo Mello | 7^{7} | 7

Qualifying competition
1 | (United States) Rajeev Ram
7 | (Brazil) Ricardo Mello | w/o

==== Second qualifier ====
| First round | | | Second round | | | | Qualifying competition |
| | | | 2 | (Germany) Simon Stadler | 6 | 6 |
| (United States) Jamie Gresh | 4 | 3 | | (Russia) Artem Sitak | 2 | 1 |
| (Russia) Artem Sitak | 6 | 6 | | | | | 2 | (Germany) Simon Stadler | 6^{9} | 4 |
| (Australia) Sam Groth | 7^{7} | 6 | | | | | | (Australia) Sam Groth | 7^{11} | 6 |
| (United Kingdom) Chris Eaton | 6^{4} | 3 | | (Australia) Sam Groth | 6 | 6 |
| | | | 6 | (United Kingdom) Josh Goodall | 3 | 4 |

==== Third qualifier ====
First round
(Argentina) Sebastián Prieto | 5 | 3
(Germany) Frank Moser | 7 | 6
(Japan) Toshihide Matsui | 2 | 5
(South Africa) Izak van der Merwe | 6 | 7
(Australia) Matt Reid | 7^{7} | 4 | 0
8 | (Austria) Alexander Peya | 6^{5} | 6 | 6

Second round
3 | (Japan) Go Soeda | 6 | 7^{7}
(Germany) Frank Moser | 3 | 6^{5}
(South Africa) Izak van der Merwe | 3 | 4
8 | (Austria) Alexander Peya | 6 | 6

Qualifying competition
3 | (Japan) Go Soeda | 3 | 1
8 | (Austria) Alexander Peya | 6 | 6

==== Fourth qualifier ====
| First round | | | | Second round | | | | | Qualifying competition |
| | | | | 4 | (Italy) Andrea Stoppini | 6^{5} | 7^{8} | 0 |
| (Pakistan) Aisam-ul-Haq Qureshi | 6 | 7^{7} | | | (Pakistan) Aisam-ul-Haq Qureshi | 7^{7} | 6^{6} | 0^{r} |
| (United States) Scott Lipsky | 3 | 6^{3} | | | | | | | 4 | (Italy) Andrea Stoppini | 6 | 0 | 6^{6} |
| (United States) Todd Paul | 6 | 6^{5} | 3 | | | | | | 5 | (Colombia) Alejandro Falla | 4 | 6 | 7^{8} |
| (United States) Nathan Thompson | 1 | 7^{7} | 6 | | (United States) Nathan Thompson | 2 | 5 |
| | | | | 5 | (Colombia) Alejandro Falla | 6 | 7 |
