= Richard Bloomfield =

English tennis player

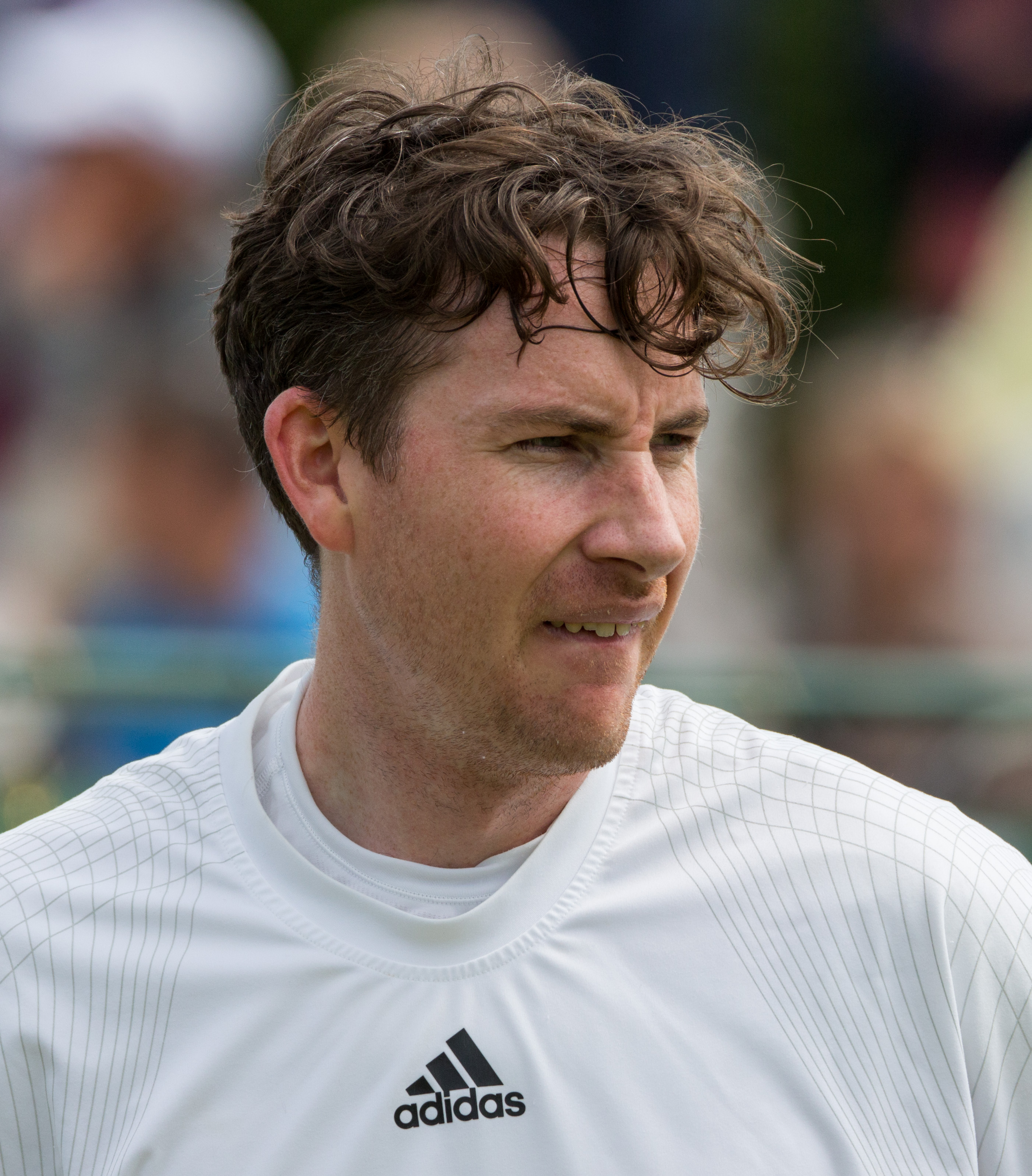
- Country (sports): (United Kingdom) Great Britain; England
- Residence: Alpington, England
- Born: 27 April 1983 (age 42); Norwich, England
- Height: 1.85 m (6 ft 1 in)
- Turned pro: 2002
- Plays: Right-handed
- Prize money: $347,103

Singles
- Career record: 4–12
- Career titles: 0
- Highest ranking: No. 176 (5 March 2007)

Grand Slam singles results
- Australian Open: Q1 (2007)
- French Open: Q1 (2007)
- Wimbledon: 2R (2006)
- US Open: Q2 (2007)

Doubles
- Career record: 2–4
- Career titles: 0
- Highest ranking: No. 172 (14 April 2008)

Grand Slam doubles results
- Wimbledon: 3R (2007)
- Last updated on: 22 June 2015.

Richard Bloomfield (born 27 April 1983, in Norwich) is an English former professional male tennis player. He turned professional in 2002 and reached a peak world ranking of 176 in March 2007. 'Bloomers', as he is known to the tennis world, is from the small Norfolk village of Alpington.

== Tennis career ==
Bloomfield won the 2001 British Junior Tennis Championships, defeating Alex Bogdanovic in the final. He also won the equivalent doubles title with Ken Skupski. He played his first senior tennis that year, losing to future French Open finalist Robin Söderling in the qualifying draw for the Bolton Challenger. He continued to play doubles and singles on the futures and challenger tours. His first full ATP tournament was the 2003 Wimbledon men's singles as a wild card, in which he lost in the first round to Antony Dupuis.

Arguably his most successful season to date came in 2006, when he reached the second round at Wimbledon, beating Carlos Berlocq to record his first ATP level victory. Bloomfield's unexpected victory was investigated by ATP officials concerned about betting patterns, but no evidence was found of any wrongdoing. Bloomfield also won two futures tournaments in 2006, reached the semi-final of Rennes Challenger, losing to Jo-Wilfried Tsonga, and a further three doubles semi-finals of the Challenger tour. Early 2007 saw him reach his first ever Challenger singles final, losing to Michał Przysiężny in Wrexham in January. It was shortly after this that Bloomfield achieved his highest ranking to date of 176. Bloomfield also reached two further doubles Challenger finals and, partnering Jonathan Marray, made the third round of the men's doubles at the 2007 Wimbledon Championships. In 2008 he recorded his highest doubles ranking, of 172.

Bloomfield's ranking fell over 2008 and 2009, despite qualifying for the 2008 Artois Championships and the 2009 Open 13, his first successful qualifications for ATP tournaments. Despite putting up a good fight in the Open 13, Bloomfield was eventually knocked out in the first round by Simone Bolelli of Italy (7–6, 7–6) A series of back injuries saw Bloomfield's ranking fall further, before he achieved a surprise qualification for the 2010 Hall of Fame Tennis Championships in Newport, Rhode Island. Here, Bloomfield achieved his first wins on the ATP Tour since Wimbledon in 2006, making his way to the semi-finals. This included a win over world number 56, Santiago Giraldo, before losing to Mardy Fish by a score of 7–6^{(5)}, 6–4. His season finished early, however, when he aggravated his back injury during a tournament in France in September 2010.

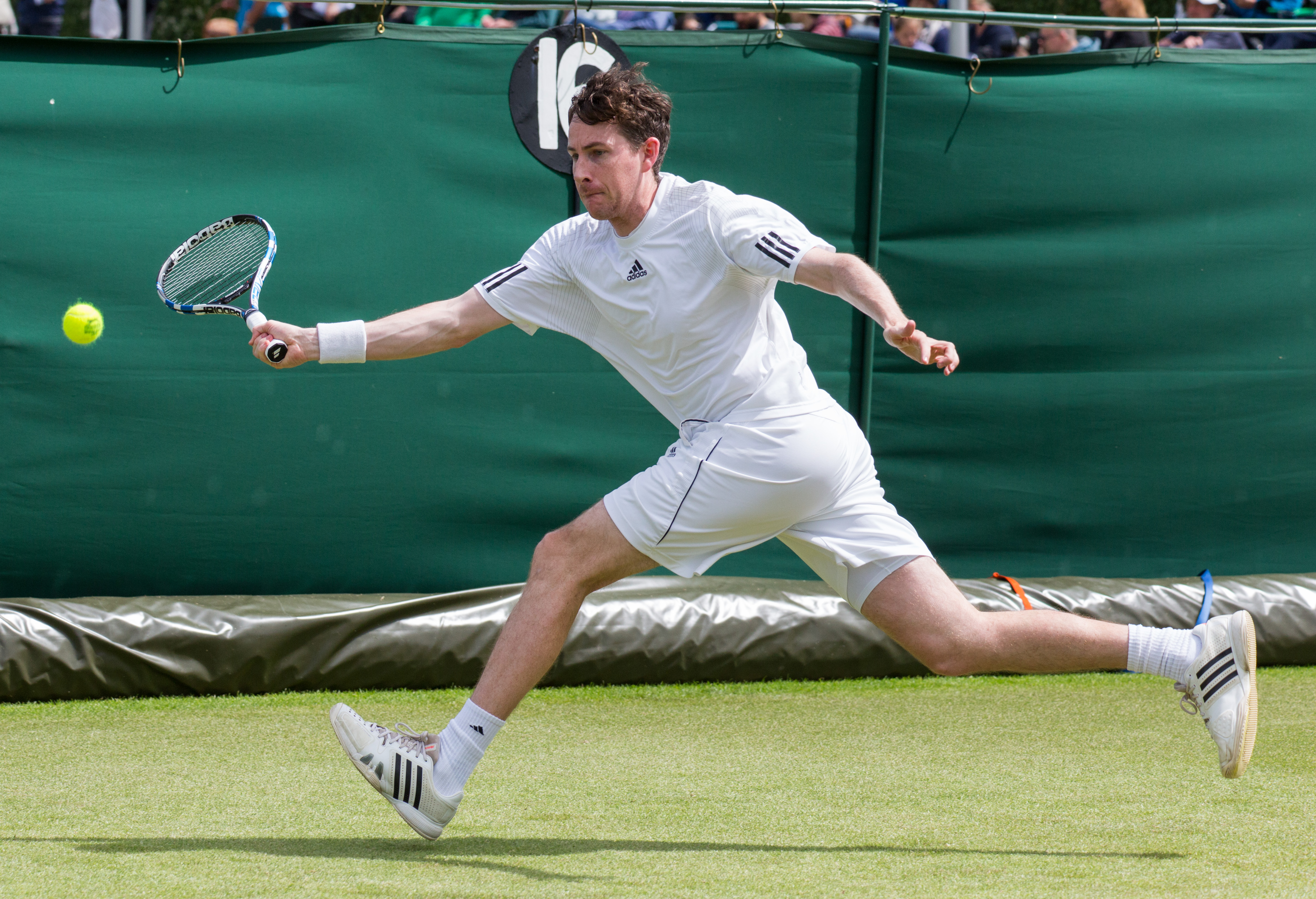
Bloomfield at the 2015 Wimbledon Qualifying

In 2011 Bloomfield continued to play in Futures tournaments, as well as qualifying for two tournaments on the Challenger tour. Remarkably, however, Bloomfield qualified once again for the Hall of Fame Tennis Championships, defeating Rajeev Ram to make his first ATP tournament since his previous appearance at the 2010 tournament. At the 2011 Championships, however, Bloomfield lost in the first round to Édouard Roger-Vasselin. Subsequently, Bloomfield returned to competing predominantly in the Futures tour. In 2014 he moved to competing on the AEGON British Tour, dropping out of the ATP rankings in 2015 before securing a place in the Wimbledon qualifying draw via the Wild-Card Play-Off competition.

== Tour finals ==
=== Singles (0–2) ===
Legend
Grand Slam (0)
ATP Masters Series (0)
ATP Tour (0)
Challengers (0–2)

Outcome	No.	Date	Tournament	Surface	Opponent	Score
Runner-up	1.	28 January 2007	Wrexham, United Kingdom	Hard (i)	(Poland) Michał Przysiężny	2–6, 3–6
Runner-up	2.	20 July 2008	Manchester, United Kingdom	Carpet	(Sweden) Björn Rehnquist	6-7, 6–0, 3–6
