= 2011 Campbell's Hall of Fame Tennis Championships =

- Date: July 4 – July 10
- Edition: 36th
- Category: ATP World Tour 250 series
- Draw: 32S / 16D
- Prize money: $442,500
- Surface: Grass court / Outdoor
- Location: Newport, Rhode Island

Champions

Singles
- (United States) John Isner

Doubles
- (Australia) Matthew Ebden / (United States) Ryan Harrison
- Hall of Fame Tennis Championships

The 2011 Hall of Fame Tennis Championships (also known as the Campbell's Hall of Fame Tennis Championships for sponsorship reasons) was a tennis tournament played on outdoor grass courts. It was the 36th edition of the Hall of Fame Tennis Championships, and was part of the ATP World Tour 250 series of the 2011 ATP World Tour. It took place at the International Tennis Hall of Fame in Newport, Rhode Island, United States, from July 4 through July 10, 2011.

== Finals ==
=== Singles ===
(United States) John Isner defeated (Belgium) Olivier Rochus, 6–3, 7–6^{(8–6)}

- It was Isner's 1st title of the year and 2nd of his career.

=== Doubles ===
(Australia) Matthew Ebden / (United States) Ryan Harrison defeated (Sweden) Johan Brunström / (Canada) Adil Shamasdin, 4–6, 6–3, [10–5]

== Singles main draw entrants ==
=== Seeds ===
Country	Player	Ranking*	Seeding
USA	John Isner	47	1
BUL	Grigor Dimitrov	62	2
RUS	Igor Kunitsyn	66	3
USA	Ryan Sweeting	69	4
USA	Alex Bogomolov, Jr.	72	5
BEL	Olivier Rochus	73	6
GER	Michael Berrer	76	7
GER	Tobias Kamke	83	8

- Seedings are based on the rankings of June 21, 2011.

=== Other entrants ===
The following players received wildcards into the singles main draw:

- (Germany) Tommy Haas
- (United States) John Isner
- (United States) Denis Kudla

The following players received entry from the qualifying draw:

- (United Kingdom) Richard Bloomfield
- (United Kingdom) Alex Bogdanovic
- (Chinese Taipei) Jimmy Wang
- (United States) Michael Yani
