= Rajeev Ram =

American tennis player (born 1984)

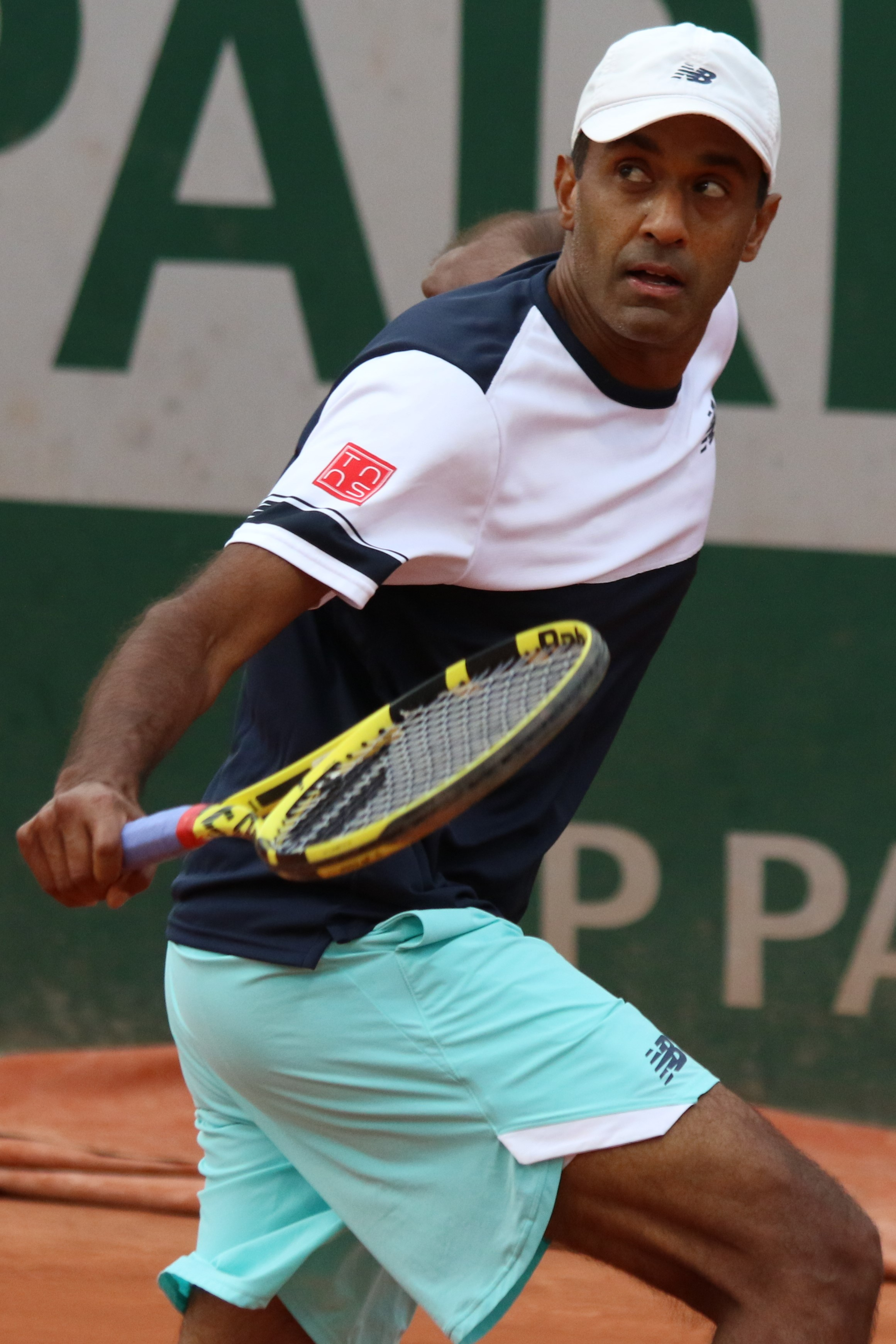
- Ram at the 2022 French Open
- Country (sports): United States
- Residence: Carmel, Indiana, US
- Born: March 18, 1984 (age 42) Denver, Colorado, US
- Height: 6 ft 4 in (1.93 m)
- Turned pro: 2004
- Retired: 2017 (singles); 2026 (doubles)
- Plays: Right-handed (one-handed backhand)
- College: University of Illinois
- Coach: Bryan Smith, David O'Hare
- Prize money: US $10,485,050

Singles
- Career record: 57–93
- Career titles: 2
- Highest ranking: No. 56 (April 18, 2016)

Grand Slam singles results
- Australian Open: 2R (2013, 2016)
- French Open: 1R (2010, 2016)
- Wimbledon: 2R (2013)
- US Open: 2R (2013, 2015)

Doubles
- Career record: 511–368
- Career titles: 32
- Highest ranking: No. 1 (October 3, 2022)

Grand Slam doubles results
- Australian Open: W (2020)
- French Open: QF (2011, 2019, 2020, 2022, 2024)
- Wimbledon: SF (2016, 2021, 2022)
- US Open: W (2021, 2022, 2023)

Other doubles tournaments
- Tour Finals: W (2022, 2023)
- Olympic Games: F (2024)

Mixed doubles
- Career titles: 2

Grand Slam mixed doubles results
- Australian Open: W (2019, 2021)
- French Open: SF (2017)
- Wimbledon: 3R (2011, 2021)
- US Open: F (2016)

Other mixed doubles tournaments
- Olympic Games: F (2016)
Olympic medal record
Men's tennis
Representing United States
Olympic Games
Silver medal – second place	2016 Rio de Janeiro	Mixed Doubles
Silver medal – second place	2024 Paris	Men's Doubles

Rajeev Ram (/rəˈʒiːv ˈrɑːm/ rə-ZHEEV RAHM; born March 18, 1984) is an American former professional tennis player. He has been ranked world No. 1 in men's doubles by the Association of Tennis Professionals (ATP). Ram is a six-time major champion, having won the 2020 Australian Open, the 2021 US Open, the 2022 US Open, and the 2023 US Open in men's doubles with Joe Salisbury, as well as Australian Open mixed doubles titles in 2019 and 2021 alongside Barbora Krejčíková. Ram has also won two Olympic silver medals, in mixed doubles with Venus Williams at the 2016 Olympics, and in doubles with Austin Krajicek at the 2024 Olympics.

He also finished runner-up in men's doubles at the 2021 Australian Open, and in mixed doubles at the 2016 US Open. He became world No. 1 for the first time in October 2022, and has won 32 doubles titles on the ATP Tour, including six at Masters 1000 level. Ram has qualified for the ATP Finals on six occasions, winning the title in 2022 and in 2023, having finished as runner-up in both 2016 and 2021.

Prior to his retirement from singles in 2017, Ram reached a career-high ranking of world No. 56 in April 2016, and won two ATP singles titles, at the Hall of Fame Tennis Championships in both 2009 and 2015. He made his Davis Cup debut for the United States in 2021, and competed at the 2016, the 2021 and the 2024 Olympic Games.

== Early life ==
Ram was born in Denver to Raghav and Sushma Ram, both immigrants from India. His father was a Kannadiga from Bangalore and his mother is from Delhi. Ram has described his knowledge of Hindi as "decent," but admitted that he unsuccessfully tried to learn Kannada, the language of his father's family.

Ram attended Carmel High School in Carmel, Indiana. His father died of pancreatic cancer in 2019.

== Junior and college career ==
In his junior career, Ram won a total of nine national junior titles, including singles and doubles. Among his titles were the National Claycourt 14-and-under singles title, the boys' 16-and-under national championship, the 18-and-under Easter Bowl title, and the Target Cup tournaments. In addition to his nine junior titles, Ram played high school tennis at Carmel, earned All-State honors, became the state singles champion, and earned a scholarship in both 1998 and 1999.

Rajeev earned a wildcard entry into the Juniors' 2001 US Open. Ram participated in all of the Grand Slam junior tournaments. He was the runner-up in juniors doubles at the 2002 Wimbledon, partnered with Brian Baker.

Ram then delayed enrollment at the University of Illinois Urbana–Champaign until January 2003 so that he could continue to play tennis as an amateur on the pro circuit. During his one semester at Illinois, he won the national doubles title with Brian Wilson and helped the Fighting Illini go undefeated (32–0) and win the 2003 NCAA team championship.

== Professional career ==
=== 2007–08: First Challenger titles ===
In 2007, he won five doubles Challenger titles partnering Bobby Reynolds, and reached three other finals on his way to a career-high doubles ranking of No. 62.

On July 5, 2008, Ram won the Nielsen USTA Pro Tennis Championship in Winnetka, Illinois, for his first career Challenger-level singles title.

=== 2009: First ATP singles and doubles titles ===
He won his first ATP doubles title in Chennai, India, with compatriot Eric Butorac.

On July 10, 2009, Ram accomplished the unusual feat of winning four professional-level tennis matches in one day. At the Hall of Fame Tennis Championships in Rhode Island, the tournament had been rained out early in the week, pushing back many scheduled matches. On July 10, Ram advanced to the singles semifinals with wins over Samuel Groth and Jesse Levine and then partnered with Jordan Kerr to advance to the doubles semifinals with wins over Arnaud Clément/Olivier Rochus and Nicolas Mahut/Fabrice Santoro. Mahut, Santoro, and Rochus each played three matches that day, though none of them won all their matches. Ram then beat Rochus and Sam Querrey on consecutive days to capture his first ATP title. He accomplished the rare feat of winning a title as a lucky loser and also captured the doubles title.

In Atlanta in July 2010, he won his first doubles title with American Scott Lipsky, defeating Rohan Bopanna and Kristof Vliegen for the outdoor hard-court Atlanta Tennis Championships. In the semifinals, Lipsky and Ram had defeated John Isner and James Blake. In November, they won a tournament in Eckental, Germany.

=== 2011: French Open doubles quarterfinal ===
Ram started 2011 strong, partnering with Lipsky in February to take the indoor hard court San Jose Open (over Christopher Kas from Germany and Alexander Peya from Austria) and the outdoor hard-court Delray Beach titles (over Alejandro Falla from Colombia and Xavier Malisse from Belgium). In June, he and Lipsky advanced to the quarterfinals at the French Open.

=== 2013–2015: First Grand Slam doubles semifinal, second ATP singles title ===
In 2013, he teamed with Rohan Bopanna, and in Dubai, they reached the semifinals.

At the 2014 US Open he reached his first Grand Slam semifinal partnering Scott Lipsky where they were defeated by top seeds and eventual champions, the Bryan brothers.

At the 2015 Hall of Fame Tennis Championships, he reached his second career final and won his second career ATP singles title by defeating Ivo Karlović.

=== 2016: Olympic silver and first Major mixed doubles final, ATP Tour Finals runner-up ===
At the Delray Beach Open, Ram reached his third career final and first singles final outside the grass courts of the Hall of Fame Open, losing to Sam Querrey. At the Olympic Games, he won silver with Venus Williams in mixed doubles. Less than a month later, Ram and CoCo Vandeweghe advanced to the mixed doubles final at the US Open, where they were defeated in straight sets by Mate Pavić and Laura Siegemund.

Ram and partner Raven Klaasen reached the final at the ATP World Tour Finals, losing to Henri Kontinen and John Peers.

=== 2018–2019: Australian Open mixed doubles title ===
In 2019, Ram won three doubles titles, including Munich with Ivan Dodig over Nikola Mektić and Alexander Peya, Moscow with Austin Krajicek over Max Mirnyi and Philipp Oswald, and Paris with Marcel Granollers over Jean-Julien Rojer and Horia Tecău.

Playing with Barbora Krejčíková, he won the 2019 Australian Open mixed doubles title.

=== 2020–2021: Australian Open men's doubles title, top 5 debut ===
Ram, with his partner Joe Salisbury won the 2020 Australian Open men's doubles tournament, defeating Max Purcell and Luke Saville in the final. As a result, he reached a career high of world No. 5 in doubles, on February 3, 2020.

Ram and Barbora Krejčíková won 2021 Australian Open mixed doubles tournament, defeating Matthew Ebden and Samantha Stosur. He also competed in the men's doubles tournament with partner Joe Salisbury to defend their title, but lost to Ivan Dodig and Filip Polášek in the final.

He reached the final and won his third Masters 1000 in Canada at the National Bank Open with Salisbury, defeating world No. 1 and No. 2 Croatians, Pavic and Mektic, his second final for the year at a Masters level after the Italian Open, where they lost to the Croatian pair. As a result, he returned to the top 5, on August 16, 2021.

At the 2021 US Open Ram, partnering with Salisbury, reached the final, defeating Matthew Ebden and Max Purcell in a nearly-three-hour-long match, saving four match points in the quarterfinals and Sam Querrey/Steve Johnson in the semifinals. The pair won the men's doubles tournament, defeating Jamie Murray and Bruno Soares in the final. As a result, he reached a career high of world No. 4 in doubles, on September 20, 2021.

=== 2022: US Open champion, two Masters 1000 titles, ATP Finals crown, World No. 1 ===
He became World No. 2 on April 4, 2022, after reaching the quarterfinals at the Miami Open, losing to eventual champions Hubert Hurkacz and John Isner, with his partner Joe Salisbury who became World No. 1. He won the 2022 Monte-Carlo Masters with Salisbury defeating sixth-seeded pair of Robert Farah and Juan Sebastián Cabal.

He won his second Masters doubles title of the season at the 2022 Western & Southern Open with Salisbury. At the 2022 US Open, Ram and Salisbury defended their title, defeating Wesley Koolhof and Neal Skupski in the finals. This was the third Grand Slam title together for Ram and Salisbury. They became just the second team to repeat as men's doubles champions at this Major in the Open era other than Todd Woodbridge and Mark Woodforde who went also back-to-back in New York. Ram became the oldest first-time World No. 1 in the doubles rankings on October 3, 2022. He is the 18th American to become No. 1 in the rankings. The pair ended the year by winning the ATP Finals in Turin, Italy, beating Nikola Mektic and Mate Pavic 7–6, 6–4 in the final.

=== 2023: Third US Open doubles title ===
Ram began his 2023 season at the Maharashtra Open with Joe Salisbury. The pair reached the semifinals before losing to 4th seeds Vliegen/Gille. Next, at the Australian Open, Ram and Salisbury lost in the third round.

In the U.S. Sunshine Swing, the pair entered the Indian Wells Masters seeded second and fell in the third round to Grigor Dimitrov and Hubert Hurkacz. At the Miami Masters, they experienced another early exit in the fourth round.

In the spring clay court season, Ram and Salisbury reached their maiden masters quarterfinals of the season at the Rome Masters.

At the 2023 US Open, Ram and Salisbury defended their title, defeating Rohan Bopanna and Matthew Ebden in the finals. It was their third straight US Open title.

=== 2024: Olympics Silver medal and split from Salisbury ===
In July 2024, Rajeev Ram and Austin Krajicek won the doubles match against Ukraine for an insurmountable 3–0 lead in the best-of-five-match qualifying series. Their victory secured a spot for the United States in the Davis Cup Finals group round.

He won the silver medal with Austin Krajicek at the Paris Olympics. Aged 40, Ram became the oldest tennis player to win an Olympic medal in 116 years (since 44-year-old George Hillyard in 1908).

At the US Open, Ram and Salisbury went out in the third round to Nathaniel Lammons and Jackson Withrow, suffering their first loss at the tournament in four years after a run of 20 successive wins. Three weeks later they announced they had ended their partnership.

=== 2025–2026: Cincinnati doubles title, retirement ===
Partnering with Christian Harrison, Ram reached the doubles final at the 2025 Auckland Classic, but withdrew before the match against Nikola Mektić and Michael Venus due to Ram suffering an arm injury.

Teaming up with Nikola Mektić, he won doubles title at the 2025 Cincinnati Open, defeating Lorenzo Musetti and Lorenzo Sonego in the final.

Reunited with Joe Salisbury, Ram reached the semifinals at the 2026 US Open, where they lost to sixth seeds Kevin Krawietz and Tim Pütz. He confirmed his retirement from professional tennis after the match.

== World TeamTennis ==
Ram made his World TeamTennis debut in 2017 with the San Diego Aviators. He joined the Chicago Smash for its debut season, during the 2020 WTT season set to begin July 12.

== Significant finals ==
=== Grand Slam finals ===
==== Doubles: 5 (4 titles, 1 runner-up) ====
Result	Year	Championship	Surface	Partner	Opponents	Score
Win	2020	Australian Open	Hard	(United Kingdom) Joe Salisbury	(Australia) Max Purcell (Australia) Luke Saville	6–4, 6–2
Loss	2021	Australian Open	Hard	(United Kingdom) Joe Salisbury	(Croatia) Ivan Dodig (Slovakia) Filip Polášek	3–6, 4–6
Win	2021	US Open	Hard	(United Kingdom) Joe Salisbury	(United Kingdom) Jamie Murray (Brazil) Bruno Soares	3–6, 6–2, 6–2
Win	2022	US Open (2)	Hard	(United Kingdom) Joe Salisbury	(Netherlands) Wesley Koolhof (United Kingdom) Neal Skupski	7–6^{(7–4)}, 7–5
Win	2023	US Open (3)	Hard	(United Kingdom) Joe Salisbury	(India) Rohan Bopanna (Australia) Matthew Ebden	2–6, 6–3, 6–4

==== Mixed doubles: 3 (2 titles, 1 runner-up) ====
Result	Year	Championship	Surface	Partner	Opponents	Score
Loss	2016	US Open	Hard	(United States) CoCo Vandeweghe	(Germany) Laura Siegemund (Croatia) Mate Pavić	4–6, 4–6
Win	2019	Australian Open	Hard	(Czech Republic) Barbora Krejčíková	(Australia) Astra Sharma (Australia) John-Patrick Smith	7–6^{(7–3)}, 6–1
Win	2021	Australian Open (2)	Hard	(Czech Republic) Barbora Krejčíková	(Australia) Samantha Stosur (Australia) Matthew Ebden	6–1, 6–4

=== Year-end championships finals ===
==== Doubles: 4 (2 titles, 2 runner-ups) ====
Result	Year	Championship	Surface	Partner	Opponents	Score
Loss	2016	ATP Finals, London	Hard (i)	(South Africa) Raven Klaasen	(Finland) Henri Kontinen (Australia) John Peers	6–2, 1–6, [8–10]
Loss	2021	ATP Finals, Turin	Hard (i)	(United Kingdom) Joe Salisbury	(France) Pierre-Hugues Herbert (France) Nicolas Mahut	4–6, 6–7^{(0–7)}
Win	2022	ATP Finals, Turin	Hard (i)	(United Kingdom) Joe Salisbury	(Croatia) Nikola Mektić (Croatia) Mate Pavić	7–6^{(7–4)}, 6–4
Win	2023	ATP Finals, Turin (2)	Hard (i)	(United Kingdom) Joe Salisbury	(Spain) Marcel Granollers (Argentina) Horacio Zeballos	6–3, 6–4

=== Masters 1000 finals ===
==== Doubles: 10 (6 titles, 4 runner-ups) ====
Result	Year	Tournament	Surface	Partner	Opponents	Score
Loss	2016	Miami Open	Hard	(South Africa) Raven Klaasen	(France) Pierre-Hugues Herbert (France) Nicolas Mahut	7–5, 1–6, [7–10]
Win	2017	Indian Wells Masters	Hard	(South Africa) Raven Klaasen	(Poland) Łukasz Kubot (Brazil) Marcelo Melo	6–7^{(1–7)}, 6–4, [10–8]
Win	2018	Paris Masters	Hard (i)	(Spain) Marcel Granollers	(Netherlands) Jean-Julien Rojer (Romania) Horia Tecău	6–4, 6–4
Loss	2021	Italian Open	Clay	(United Kingdom) Joe Salisbury	(Croatia) Nikola Mektić (Croatia) Mate Pavić	4–6, 6–7^{(4–7)}
Win	2021	Canadian Open	Hard	(United Kingdom) Joe Salisbury	(Croatia) Nikola Mektić (Croatia) Mate Pavić	6–3, 4–6, [10–3]
Win	2022	Monte-Carlo Masters	Clay	(United Kingdom) Joe Salisbury	(Colombia) Juan Sebastián Cabal (Colombia) Robert Farah	6–4, 3–6, [10–7]
Win	2022	Cincinnati Masters	Hard	(United Kingdom) Joe Salisbury	(Germany) Tim Pütz (New Zealand) Michael Venus	7–6^{(7–4)}, 7–6^{(7–5)}
Loss	2023	Canadian Open	Hard	(United Kingdom) Joe Salisbury	(El Salvador) Marcelo Arévalo (Netherlands) Jean-Julien Rojer	3–6, 1–6
Loss	2024	Canadian Open	Hard	(United Kingdom) Joe Salisbury	(Spain) Marcel Granollers (Argentina) Horacio Zeballos	2–6, 6–7^{(4–7)}
Win	2025	Cincinnati Masters (2)	Hard	(Croatia) Nikola Mektić	(Italy) Lorenzo Musetti (Italy) Lorenzo Sonego	4–6, 6–3, [10–5]

=== Olympic medal matches ===
==== Doubles: 1 (1 silver medal) ====
Result	Year	Championship	Surface	Partner	Opponents	Score
Silver	2024	2024 Summer Olympics, France	Clay	(United States) Austin Krajicek	(Australia) Matthew Ebden (Australia) John Peers	7–6^{(8–6)}, 6–7^{(1–7)}, [8–10]

==== Mixed doubles: 1 (1 silver medal) ====
Result	Year	Championship	Surface	Partner	Opponents	Score
Silver	2016	2016 Summer Olympics, Brazil	Hard	(United States) Venus Williams	(United States) Bethanie Mattek-Sands (United States) Jack Sock	7–6^{(7–3)}, 1–6, [7–10]

== ATP career finals ==
=== Singles: 3 (2 titles, 1 runner-up) ===
Legend Grand Slam tournaments (0–0) ATP World Tour Finals (0–0) ATP World Tour Masters 1000 (0–0) ATP World Tour 500 Series (0–0) ATP World Tour 250 Series (2–1)	Finals by surface Hard (0–1) Clay (0–0) Grass (2–0)	Finals by setting Outdoor (2–1) Indoor (0–0)

Result	W–L	Date	Tournament	Tier	Surface	Opponent	Score
Win	1–0	Jul 2009	Hall of Fame Tennis Championships, United States	250 Series	Grass	(United States) Sam Querrey	6–7^{(3–7)}, 7–5, 6–3
Win	2–0	Jul 2015	Hall of Fame Tennis Championships, United States (2)	250 Series	Grass	(Croatia) Ivo Karlović	7–6^{(7–5)}, 5–7, 7–6^{(7–2)}
Loss	2–1	Feb 2016	Delray Beach Open, United States	250 Series	Hard	(United States) Sam Querrey	4–6, 6–7^{(6–8)}

=== Doubles: 57 (32 titles, 25 runner-ups) ===
Legend Grand Slam tournaments (4–1) ATP World Tour Finals (2–2) ATP World Tour Masters 1000 (6–4) Summer Olympics (0–1) ATP World Tour 500 Series (5–3) ATP World Tour 250 Series (15–14)	Finals by surface Hard (25–16) Clay (3–4) Grass (4–5)	Finals by setting Outdoor (23–20) Indoor (9–5)

Result	W–L	Date	Tournament	Tier	Surface	Partner	Opponents	Score
Loss	0–1	Aug 2005	New Haven Open, United States	Intl Series	Hard	(United States) Bobby Reynolds	(Argentina) Gastón Etlis (Argentina) Martín Rodríguez	4–6, 3–6
Win	1–1	Jan 2009	Chennai Open, India	250 Series	Hard	(United States) Eric Butorac	(Switzerland) Jean-Claude Scherrer (Switzerland) Stan Wawrinka	6–3, 6–4
Win	2–1	Jul 2009	Hall of Fame Tennis Championships, United States	250 Series	Grass	(Australia) Jordan Kerr	(Germany) Michael Kohlmann (Netherlands) Rogier Wassen	6–7^{(6–8)}, 7–6^{(9–7)}, [10–6]
Win	3–1	Oct 2009	Thailand Open, Thailand	250 Series	Hard (i)	(United States) Eric Butorac	(Spain) Guillermo García López (Germany) Mischa Zverev	7–6^{(7–4)}, 6–3
Win	4–1	Jul 2010	Atlanta Open, United States	250 Series	Hard	(United States) Scott Lipsky	(India) Rohan Bopanna (Belgium) Kristof Vliegen	6–3, 6–7^{(4–7)}, [12–10]
Loss	4–2	Feb 2011	SA Tennis Open, South Africa	250 Series	Hard	(United States) Scott Lipsky	(United States) James Cerretani (Canada) Adil Shamasdin	3–6, 6–3, [7–10]
Win	5–2	Feb 2011	Pacific Coast Championships, United States	250 Series	Hard (i)	(United States) Scott Lipsky	(Colombia) Alejandro Falla (Belgium) Xavier Malisse	6–4, 4–6, [10–8]
Win	6–2	Feb 2011	Delray Beach Open, United States	250 Series	Hard	(United States) Scott Lipsky	(Germany) Christopher Kas (Austria) Alexander Peya	4–6, 6–4, [10–3]
Win	7–2	Sep 2012	St. Petersburg Open, Russia	250 Series	Hard (i)	(Serbia) Nenad Zimonjić	(Slovakia) Lukáš Lacko (Slovakia) Igor Zelenay	6–2, 4–6, [10–6]
Loss	7–3	Jul 2014	Hall of Fame Tennis Championships, United States	250 Series	Grass	(Israel) Jonathan Erlich	(Australia) Chris Guccione (Australia) Lleyton Hewitt	5–7, 4–6
Win	8–3	Jun 2015	Halle Open, Germany	500 Series	Grass	(South Africa) Raven Klaasen	(India) Rohan Bopanna (Romania) Florin Mergea	7–6^{(7–5)}, 6–2
Loss	8–4	Oct 2015	Malaysian Open, Malaysia	250 Series	Hard (i)	(South Africa) Raven Klaasen	(Philippines) Treat Huey (Finland) Henri Kontinen	6–7^{(4–7)}, 2–6
Loss	8–5	Apr 2016	Miami Open, United States	Masters 1000	Hard	(South Africa) Raven Klaasen	(France) Pierre-Hugues Herbert (France) Nicolas Mahut	7–5, 1–6, [7–10]
Loss	8–6	May 2016	Geneva Open, Switzerland	250 Series	Clay	(South Africa) Raven Klaasen	(United States) Steve Johnson (United States) Sam Querrey	4–6, 1–6
Win	9–6	Jun 2016	Halle Open, Germany (2)	500 Series	Grass	(South Africa) Raven Klaasen	(Poland) Łukasz Kubot (Austria) Alexander Peya	7–6^{(7–5)}, 6–2
Win	10–6	Oct 2016	Chengdu Open, China	250 Series	Hard	(South Africa) Raven Klaasen	(Spain) Pablo Carreño Busta (Poland) Mariusz Fyrstenberg	7–6^{(7–2)}, 7–5
Loss	10–7	Oct 2016	Japan Open, Japan	500 Series	Hard	(South Africa) Raven Klaasen	(Spain) Marcel Granollers (Poland) Marcin Matkowski	2–6, 6–7^{(4–7)}
Loss	10–8	Nov 2016	ATP World Tour Finals, United Kingdom	Tour Finals	Hard (i)	(South Africa) Raven Klaasen	(Finland) Henri Kontinen (Australia) John Peers	6–2, 1–6, [8–10]
Win	11–8	Feb 2017	Delray Beach Open, United States (2)	250 Series	Hard	(South Africa) Raven Klaasen	(Philippines) Treat Huey (Belarus) Max Mirnyi	7–5, 7–5
Win	12–8	Mar 2017	Indian Wells Masters, United States	Masters 1000	Hard	(South Africa) Raven Klaasen	(Poland) Łukasz Kubot (Brazil) Marcelo Melo	6–7^{(1–7)}, 6–4, [10–8]
Loss	12–9	Jun 2017	Rosmalen Grass Court Championships, Netherlands	250 Series	Grass	(South Africa) Raven Klaasen	(Poland) Łukasz Kubot (Brazil) Marcelo Melo	3–6, 4–6
Win	13–9	Jul 2017	Hall of Fame Tennis Championships, United States (2)	250 Series	Grass	(Pakistan) Aisam-ul-Haq Qureshi	(Australia) Matt Reid (Australia) John-Patrick Smith	6–4, 4–6, [10–7]
Win	14–9	Sep 2017	Shenzhen Open, China	250 Series	Hard	(Austria) Alexander Peya	(Croatia) Nikola Mektić (United States) Nicholas Monroe	6–3, 6–2
Win	15–9	May 2018	Bavarian Championships, Germany	250 Series	Clay	(Croatia) Ivan Dodig	(Croatia) Nikola Mektić (Austria) Alexander Peya	6–3, 7–5
Loss	15–10	May 2018	Geneva Open, Switzerland	250 Series	Clay	(Croatia) Ivan Dodig	(Austria) Oliver Marach (Croatia) Mate Pavić	6–3, 6–7^{(3–7)}, [9–11]
Loss	15–11	Jul 2018	Atlanta Open, United States	250 Series	Hard	(United States) Ryan Harrison	(United States) Nicholas Monroe (Australia) John-Patrick Smith	6–3, 6–7^{(5–7)}, [8–10]
Loss	15–12	Sep 2018	Shenzhen Open, China	250 Series	Hard	(Sweden) Robert Lindstedt	(Japan) Ben McLachlan (United Kingdom) Joe Salisbury	6–7^{(5–7)}, 6–7^{(4–7)}
Win	16–12	Oct 2018	Kremlin Cup, Russia	250 Series	Hard (i)	(United States) Austin Krajicek	(Belarus) Max Mirnyi (Austria) Philipp Oswald	7–6^{(7–4)}, 6–4
Win	17–12	Nov 2018	Paris Masters, France	Masters 1000	Hard (i)	(Spain) Marcel Granollers	(Netherlands) Jean-Julien Rojer (Romania) Horia Tecău	6–4, 6–4
Loss	17–13	Jan 2019	Brisbane International, Australia	250 Series	Hard	(United Kingdom) Joe Salisbury	(New Zealand) Marcus Daniell (Netherlands) Wesley Koolhof	4–6, 6–7^{(6–8)}
Win	18–13	Mar 2019	Dubai Tennis Championships, United Arab Emirates	500 Series	Hard	(United Kingdom) Joe Salisbury	(Japan) Ben McLachlan (Germany) Jan-Lennard Struff	7–6^{(7–4)}, 6–3
Loss	18–14	Jun 2019	Queen's Club Championships, United Kingdom	500 Series	Grass	(United Kingdom) Joe Salisbury	(Spain) Feliciano López (United Kingdom) Andy Murray	6–7^{(6–8)}, 7–5, [5–10]
Loss	18–15	Oct 2019	European Open, Belgium	250 Series	Hard (i)	(United Kingdom) Joe Salisbury	(Germany) Kevin Krawietz (Germany) Andreas Mies	6–7^{(1–7)}, 3–6
Win	19–15	Oct 2019	Vienna Open, Austria	500 Series	Hard (i)	(United Kingdom) Joe Salisbury	(Poland) Łukasz Kubot (Brazil) Marcelo Melo	6–4, 6–7^{(5–7)}, [10–5]
Win	20–15	Feb 2020	Australian Open, Australia	Grand Slam	Hard	(United Kingdom) Joe Salisbury	(Australia) Max Purcell (Australia) Luke Saville	6–4, 6–2
Loss	20–16	Feb 2021	Australian Open, Australia	Grand Slam	Hard	(United Kingdom) Joe Salisbury	(Croatia) Ivan Dodig (Slovakia) Filip Polášek	3–6, 4–6
Loss	20–17	May 2021	Italian Open, Italy	Masters 1000	Clay	(United Kingdom) Joe Salisbury	(Croatia) Nikola Mektić (Croatia) Mate Pavić	4–6, 6–7^{(4–7)}
Loss	20–18	Jun 2021	Eastbourne International, United Kingdom	250 Series	Grass	(United Kingdom) Joe Salisbury	(Croatia) Nikola Mektić (Croatia) Mate Pavić	4–6, 3–6
Win	21–18	Aug 2021	Canadian Open, Canada	Masters 1000	Hard	(United Kingdom) Joe Salisbury	(Croatia) Nikola Mektić (Croatia) Mate Pavić	6–3, 4–6, [10–3]
Win	22–18	Sep 2021	US Open, United States	Grand Slam	Hard	(United Kingdom) Joe Salisbury	(United Kingdom) Jamie Murray (Brazil) Bruno Soares	3–6, 6–2, 6–2
Loss	22–19	Oct 2021	Vienna Open, Austria	500 Series	Hard (i)	(United Kingdom) Joe Salisbury	(Colombia) Juan Sebastián Cabal (Colombia) Robert Farah	4–6, 2–6
Loss	22–20	Nov 2021	ATP Finals, Italy	Tour Finals	Hard (i)	(United Kingdom) Joe Salisbury	(France) Pierre-Hugues Herbert (France) Nicolas Mahut	4–6, 6–7^{(0–7)}
Win	23–20	Apr 2022	Monte-Carlo Masters, Monaco	Masters 1000	Clay	(United Kingdom) Joe Salisbury	(Colombia) Juan Sebastián Cabal (Colombia) Robert Farah	6–4, 3–6, [10–7]
Win	24–20	Aug 2022	Cincinnati Masters, United States	Masters 1000	Hard	(United Kingdom) Joe Salisbury	(Germany) Tim Pütz (New Zealand) Michael Venus	7–6^{(7–4)}, 7–6^{(7–5)}
Win	25–20	Sep 2022	US Open, United States (2)	Grand Slam	Hard	(United Kingdom) Joe Salisbury	(Netherlands) Wesley Koolhof (United Kingdom) Neal Skupski	7–6^{(7–4)}, 7–5
Win	26–20	Nov 2022	ATP Finals, Italy	Tour Finals	Hard (i)	(United Kingdom) Joe Salisbury	(Croatia) Nikola Mektić (Croatia) Mate Pavić	7–6^{(7–4)}, 6–4
Win	27–20	May 2023	Lyon Open, France	250 Series	Clay	(United Kingdom) Joe Salisbury	(France) Nicolas Mahut (Netherlands) Matwé Middelkoop	6–0, 6–3
Loss	27–21	Aug 2023	Canadian Open, Canada	Masters 1000	Hard	(United Kingdom) Joe Salisbury	(El Salvador) Marcelo Arévalo (Netherlands) Jean-Julien Rojer	3–6, 1–6
Win	28–21	Sep 2023	US Open, United States (3)	Grand Slam	Hard	(United Kingdom) Joe Salisbury	(India) Rohan Bopanna (Australia) Matthew Ebden	2–6, 6–3, 6–4
Win	29–21	Oct 2023	Vienna Open, Austria (2)	500 Series	Hard (i)	(United Kingdom) Joe Salisbury	(United States) Nathaniel Lammons (United States) Jackson Withrow	6–4, 5–7, [12–10]
Win	30–21	Nov 2023	ATP Finals, Italy (2)	Tour Finals	Hard (i)	(United Kingdom) Joe Salisbury	(Spain) Marcel Granollers (Argentina) Horacio Zeballos	6–3, 6–4
Win	31–21	Jan 2024	Adelaide International, Australia	250 Series	Hard	(United Kingdom) Joe Salisbury	(India) Rohan Bopanna (Australia) Matthew Ebden	7–5, 5–7, [11–9]
Loss	31–22	Aug 2024	Olympic Games, France	Olympics	Clay	(United States) Austin Krajicek	(Australia) Matthew Ebden (Australia) John Peers	7–6^{(8–6)}, 6–7^{(1–7)}, [8–10]
Loss	31–23	Aug 2024	Canadian Open, Canada	Masters 1000	Hard	(United Kingdom) Joe Salisbury	(Spain) Marcel Granollers (Argentina) Horacio Zeballos	2–6, 6–7^{(4–7)}
Loss	31–24	Jan 2025	Auckland Open, New Zealand	250 Series	Hard	(United States) Christian Harrison	(Croatia) Nikola Mektić (New Zealand) Michael Venus	Walkover
Loss	31–25	Jun 2025	Stuttgart Open, Germany	250 Series	Grass	(United States) Alex Michelsen	(Mexico) Santiago González (United States) Austin Krajicek	4–6, 4–6
Win	32–25	Aug 2025	Cincinnati Masters, United States	Masters 1000	Hard	(Croatia) Nikola Mektić	(Italy) Lorenzo Musetti (Italy) Lorenzo Sonego	4–6, 6–3, [10–5]

=== Records ===
- These records were attained in the Open Era of tennis.

Tournament	Year	Record accomplished	Player tied
Newport	2009	Winning an ATP tournament as lucky loser	Heinz Gunthardt; Bill Scanlon; Francisco Clavet; Christian Miniussi; Sergiy Stakhovsky; Leonardo Mayer; Andrey Rublev; Marco Cecchinato; Kwon Soon-woo

== Performance timelines ==
Key
W	F	SF	QF	#R	RR	Q#	P#	DNQ	A	Z#	PO	G	S	B	NMS	NTI	P	NH

(W) winner; (F) finalist; (SF) semifinalist; (QF) quarterfinalist; (#R) rounds 4, 3, 2, 1; (RR) round-robin stage; (Q#) qualification round; (P#) preliminary round; (DNQ) did not qualify; (A) absent; (Z#) Davis/Fed Cup Zonal Group (with number indication) or (PO) play-off; (G) gold, (S) silver or (B) bronze Olympic/Paralympic medal; (NMS) not a Masters tournament; (NTI) not a Tier I tournament; (P) postponed; (NH) not held; (SR) strike rate (events won / competed); (W–L) win–loss record.
To avoid confusion and double counting, these charts are updated at the conclusion of a tournament or when the player's participation has ended.

=== Singles ===
Tournament	2001	2002	2003	2004	2005	2006	2007	2008	2009	2010	2011	2012	2013	2014	2015	2016	2017	SR	W–L
Grand Slam tournaments
Australian Open	A	A	A	A	A	Q2	Q1	1R	Q1	1R	Q1	Q1	2R	Q2	Q1	2R	Q3	0 / 4	2–4
French Open	A	A	A	A	A	A	Q2	A	Q2	1R	A	A	A	A	A	1R	Q1	0 / 2	0–2
Wimbledon	A	A	A	A	A	Q1	Q1	Q1	1R	1R	Q1	Q3	2R	Q3	A	1R	Q2	0 / 4	1–4
US Open	Q1	A	Q2	1R	1R	Q1	Q1	Q1	1R	Q1	Q3	1R	2R	Q3	2R	1R	A	0 / 7	2–7
Win–loss	0–0	0–0	0–0	0–1	0–1	0–0	0–0	0–1	0–2	0–3	0–0	0–1	3–3	0–0	1–1	1–4	0–0	0 / 17	5–17
ATP World Tour Masters 1000
Indian Wells Open	A	A	A	A	A	A	A	A	Q1	1R	Q1	Q1	Q1	1R	Q2	2R	Q2	0 / 3	1–3
Miami Open	A	A	Q2	A	A	A	A	A	A	1R	A	1R	1R	A	Q1	2R	A	0 / 4	1–3
Madrid Open ^{1}	A	A	A	A	A	A	A	A	A	A	A	A	A	A	A	Q1	A	0 / 0	0–0
Italian Open	A	A	A	A	A	A	A	A	A	A	A	A	A	A	A	Q2	A	0 / 0	0–0
Canadian Open	A	A	A	A	A	1R	A	A	Q1	A	A	A	Q1	A	Q2	3R	A	0 / 2	2–2
Cincinnati Open	A	A	Q1	A	Q2	Q1	Q1	1R	Q2	Q1	A	Q2	Q1	A	1R	A	A	0 / 2	0–2
Shanghai Masters ^{2}	A	A	A	A	A	A	A	A	A	A	Q1	A	A	Q1	Q1	A	A	0 / 0	0–0
Paris Masters	A	A	A	A	A	A	A	A	A	A	A	A	A	A	Q2	A	A	0 / 0	0–0
Win–loss	0–0	0–0	0–0	0–0	0–0	0–1	0–0	0–1	0–0	0–2	0–0	0–1	0–2	0–1	0–1	4–2	0–0	0 / 11	4–10
Career statistics
Titles	0	0	0	0	0	0	0	0	1	0	0	0	0	0	1	0	0	2	
Finals	0	0	0	0	0	0	0	0	1	0	0	0	0	0	1	1	0	3	
Overall win–loss	0–0	0–1	1–1	1–3	2–2	0–1	0–1	2–4	8–6	6–18	2–3	7–9	4–11	3–7	7–6	12–18	2–2	57–93	
Year-end ranking	1,383	536	437	297	195	197	253	190	79	184	149	132	127	139	89	129	353	38%	

^{1} Held as Hamburg Masters (outdoor clay) until 2008, Madrid Masters (outdoor clay) 2009 – present.
^{2} Held as Madrid Masters (indoor hard) until 2008, and Shanghai Masters (outdoor hard) 2009 – present.

=== Doubles ===
Tournament	2001	2002	2003	2004	2005	2006	2007	2008	2009	2010	2011	2012	2013	2014	2015	2016	2017	2018	2019	2020	2021	2022	2023	2024	2025	2026	SR	W–L
Grand Slam tournaments
Australian Open	A	A	A	A	A	1R	A	3R	3R	QF	1R	QF	2R	2R	1R	QF	2R	3R	3R	W	F	SF	3R	3R	3R	2R	1 / 20	42–19
French Open	A	A	A	A	A	A	A	3R	1R	1R	QF	3R	1R	1R	1R	2R	2R	2R	QF	QF	2R	QF	3R	QF	1R	1R	0 / 19	25–19
Wimbledon	A	A	A	A	A	A	QF	2R	1R	1R	2R	QF	1R	1R	2R	SF	3R	1R	3R	NH	SF	SF	1R	2R	1R	A	0 / 18	26–18
US Open	1R	1R	1R	2R	1R	1R	1R	2R	2R	2R	1R	2R	3R	SF	3R	2R	1R	1R	3R	SF	W	W	W	3R	QF	SF	3 / 26	46–23
Win–loss	0–1	0–1	0–1	1–1	0–1	0–2	3–2	6–4	3–4	4–4	4–4	9–4	3–4	5–4	3–4	9–4	4–4	3–4	9–4	12–2	16–3	17–3	10–3	8–4	5–4	5–3	4 / 83	139–79
ATP Finals
ATP Finals	Did not qualify															F	RR	DNQ	RR	SF	F	W	W	Did not qualify			2 / 7	20–8
ATP World Tour Masters 1000
Indian Wells Open	A	A	A	A	A	A	A	A	A	1R	A	A	1R	A	A	1R	W	QF	1R	NH	2R	SF	1R	2R	1R	A	1 / 11	12–10
Miami Open	A	A	A	A	A	A	A	A	A	2R	1R	A	2R	A	QF	F	1R	1R	2R	NH	SF	QF	2R	QF	1R	1R	0 / 14	17–14
Monte-Carlo Masters	A	A	A	A	A	A	A	A	A	A	A	A	A	A	A	1R	2R	2R	A	NH	2R	W	2R	2R	1R	A	1 / 8	5–7
Madrid Open ^{1}	A	A	A	A	A	A	A	A	A	A	A	A	A	A	A	2R	2R	2R	1R	NH	1R	2R	1R	1R	2R	A	0 / 9	2–9
Italian Open	A	A	A	A	A	A	A	A	A	A	A	A	A	A	A	1R	QF	2R	1R	1R	F	1R	QF	QF	1R	A	0 / 10	10–10
Canadian Open	A	A	A	A	A	A	A	A	A	A	A	A	A	A	1R	QF	SF	QF	SF	NH	W	2R	F	F	2R	1R	1 / 12	18–10
Cincinnati Open	A	A	A	A	A	A	A	A	1R	1R	A	2R	1R	A	2R	QF	2R	2R	1R	SF	QF	W	2R	QF	W	2R	2 / 16	17–14
Shanghai Masters ^{2}	A	A	A	A	A	A	A	A	A	A	1R	A	A	2R	A	2R	QF	A	QF	NH			QF	2R	A	A	0 / 8	5–7
Paris Masters	A	A	A	A	A	A	A	A	A	A	A	A	A	A	QF	2R	2R	W	QF	A	2R	QF	SF	SF	A	A	1 / 10	10–8
Win–loss	0–0	0–0	0–0	0–0	0–0	0–0	0–0	0–0	0–1	1–3	0–2	1–1	1–3	0–1	5–4	6–9	8–8	13–7	8–8	2–2	14–7	13–6	8–9	10–9	7–6	1–3	6 / 98	96–89
National representation
Summer Olympics	Not Held			A	Not Held			A	Not Held			A	Not Held			2R	Not Held				2R	Not Held		S	Not Held		0 / 3	6–3
ATP Cup	Not Held																			RR	DNQ		Not Held				0 / 1	1–2
Career statistics
Titles	0	0	0	0	0	0	0	0	3	1	2	1	0	0	1	2	4	3	2	1	2	4	4	1	1	0	32	
Finals	0	0	0	0	0	0	0	0	3	1	3	1	0	1	2	6	5	6	5	1	7	4	6	3	3	0	57	
Overall win–loss	0–2	0–1	0–3	1–2	3–4	0–3	3–3	12–10	21–13	14–19	21–19	22–16	10–15	11–13	24–23	37–25	35–22	44–26	39–24	21–11	46–18	42–17	41–20	32–23	26–22	9–14	511–368	
Year-end ranking	1,099	541	448	133	113	122	65	68	39	67	45	44	78	53	36	14	22	21	24	14	4	3	6	30	28		58%	

^{1} Held as Hamburg Masters (outdoor clay) until 2008, Madrid Masters (outdoor clay) 2009 – present.
^{2} Held as Madrid Masters (indoor hard) until 2008, and Shanghai Masters (outdoor hard) 2009 – present.

=== Mixed doubles ===
Current through the 2025 French Open.

Tournament	2009	2010	2011	2012	2013	2014	2015	2016	2017	2018	2019	2020	2021	2022	2023	2024	2025	SR	W–L	Win %
Grand Slam tournaments
Australian Open	A	A	A	A	1R	A	A	A	1R	1R	W	A	W	QF	A	A	A	2 / 6	12–4	75%
French Open	A	A	A	A	A	A	2R	A	SF	1R	A	NH	QF	A	A	A	1R	0 / 5	5–5	50%
Wimbledon	A	A	3R	A	2R	A	1R	A	2R	2R	1R	NH	3R	A	A	2R	A	0 / 8	5–7	42%
US Open	1R	2R	2R	2R	A	2R	A	F	1R	2R	SF	NH	1R	A	A	A	A	0 / 10	12–9	57%
Win–loss	0–1	1–1	3–2	1–0	1–2	1–1	1–2	4–1	3–4	1–4	8–2	0–0	7–2	2–1	0–0	1–1	0–1	2 / 29	34–25	58%
National representation
Summer Olympics	Not Held			A	Not Held			F–S	Not Held				1R	Not Held		A	NH	0 / 2	3–2	60%
