= 2017 Ladies Championship Gstaad =

- Date: 17–23 July
- Edition: 25th
- Category: WTA International tournaments
- Draw: 32S / 16D
- Prize money: $250,000
- Surface: Clay
- Location: Gstaad, Switzerland
- Venue: Roy Emerson Arena

Champions

Singles
- (Netherlands) Kiki Bertens

Doubles
- (Netherlands) Kiki Bertens / (Sweden) Johanna Larsson
← 2016 ·	WTA Swiss Open	· 2018 →

The 2017 Ladies Championship Gstaad was a women's tennis tournament, part of the International category of the 2017 WTA Tour. The 25th edition of the tournament took place on the outdoor clay courts at Roy Emerson Arena in Gstaad, Switzerland, from 17 July until 23 July 2017. Second-seeded Kiki Bertens won the singles event.

== Points and prize money ==
=== Point distribution ===
Event	W	F	SF	QF	Round of 16	Round of 32	Q	Q3	Q2	Q1
Singles	280	180	110	60	30	1	18	14	10	1
Doubles	280	180	110	60	1	—	—	—	—	—

=== Prize money ===
Event	W	F	SF	QF	Round of 16	Round of 32	Q2	Q1
Singles	$43,000	$21,400	$11,500	$6,175	$3,400	$2,100	$1,020	$600
Doubles	$12,300	$6,400	$3,435	$1,820	$960	—	—	—

== Singles main draw entrants ==
=== Seeds ===
Country	Player	Rank^{1}	Seed
FRA	Caroline Garcia	22	1
NED	Kiki Bertens	24	2
EST	Anett Kontaveit	37	3
GER	Mona Barthel	48	4
SWE	Johanna Larsson	53	5
GER	Carina Witthöft	65	6
SUI	Viktorija Golubic	73	7
RUS	Evgeniya Rodina	80	8

- ^{1} Rankings are as of 3 July 2017.

=== Other entrants ===
The following players received wildcards into the main draw:

- (Switzerland) Rebeka Masarova
- (Switzerland) Amra Sadiković
- (Switzerland) Patty Schnyder

The following players received entry from the qualifying draw:

- (Turkey) Başak Eraydın
- (Russia) Anna Kalinskaya
- (Germany) Antonia Lottner
- (Czech Republic) Tereza Smitková
- (Italy) Martina Trevisan
- (Germany) Anna Zaja

=== Withdrawals ===
Before the tournament

- (Switzerland) Timea Bacsinszky →replaced by (Bulgaria) Elitsa Kostova
- (United States) Bethanie Mattek-Sands →replaced by (Czech Republic) Tereza Martincová
- (Australia) Samantha Stosur →replaced by (Spain) Sílvia Soler Espinosa

=== Retirements ===
- (Spain) Sara Sorribes Tormo

== Doubles main draw entrants ==
=== Seeds ===
Country	Player	Country	Player	Rank^{1}	Seed
NED	Kiki Bertens	SWE	Johanna Larsson	61	1
USA	Nicole Melichar	GBR	Anna Smith	107	2
SUI	Viktorija Golubic	SRB	Nina Stojanović	152	3
RUS	Irina Khromacheva	SRB	Aleksandra Krunić	163	4

- ^{1} Rankings are as of 3 July 2017.

=== Other entrants ===
The following pairs received wildcards into the doubles main draw:

- (Switzerland) Ylena In-Albon / (Switzerland) Conny Perrin
- (Switzerland) Amra Sadiković / (Switzerland) Jil Teichmann

== Finals ==
=== Singles ===
- (Netherlands) Kiki Bertens defeated (Estonia) Anett Kontaveit, 6–4, 3–6, 6–1

=== Doubles ===
- (Netherlands) Kiki Bertens / (Sweden) Johanna Larsson defeated (Switzerland) Viktorija Golubic / (Serbia) Nina Stojanović, 7–6^{(7–4)}, 4–6, [10–7]
