= 2023 Ladies Open Lausanne =

- Date: 24–30 July
- Edition: 30th
- Category: WTA 250
- Draw: 32S / 16D
- Prize money: $259,303
- Surface: Clay
- Location: Lausanne, Switzerland
- Venue: Tennis Club Stade-Lausanne

Champions

Singles
- (Italy) Elisabetta Cocciaretto

Doubles
- (Hungary) Anna Bondár / (France) Diane Parry
← 2022 ·	WTA Swiss Open	· 2024 →

The 2023 Ladies Open Lausanne was a professional women's tennis tournament played on outdoor clay courts. It was the 30th edition of the Swiss Open, and part of the 250 category of the 2023 WTA Tour. It took place at Tennis Club Stade-Lausanne in Lausanne, Switzerland, from 24 through 30 July 2023. Second-seeded Elisabetta Cocciaretto won the singles title.

== Champions ==
=== Singles ===
- (Italy) Elisabetta Cocciaretto def. (France) Clara Burel, 7–5, 4–6, 6–4

=== Doubles ===
- (Hungary) Anna Bondár / (France) Diane Parry def. Amina Anshba / (Czech Republic) Anastasia Dețiuc 6–2, 6–1

== Singles main draw entrants ==
=== Seeds ===
Country	Player	Rank^{†}	Seed
~~ROU~~	~~Irina-Camelia Begu~~	~~31~~	~~1~~
ITA	Elisabetta Cocciaretto	42	2
ROU	Ana Bogdan	49	3
ITA	Lucia Bronzetti	53	4
USA	Emma Navarro	57	5
	Mirra Andreeva	65	6
FRA	Alizé Cornet	68	7
	Elina Avanesyan	69	8
FRA	Diane Parry	82	9

^{†} Rankings are as of 17 July 2023.

=== Other entrants ===
The following players received wildcard entry into the singles main draw:

- (Switzerland) Susan Bandecchi
- (France) Fiona Ferro
- (Switzerland) Céline Naef

The following players received entry using a protected ranking:

- Evgeniya Rodina
- (Romania) Patricia Maria Țig

The following players received entry from the qualifying draw:

- (Greece) Valentini Grammatikopoulou
- (Slovenia) Dalila Jakupović
- (Hungary) Réka Luca Jani
- (France) Chloé Paquet

The following player received entry as a lucky loser:

- (Switzerland) Jenny Dürst

=== Withdrawals ===
- (Romania) Irina-Camelia Begu → replaced by (Ukraine) Dayana Yastremska
- (Switzerland) Belinda Bencic → replaced by (France) Léolia Jeanjean
- (Ukraine) Kateryna Baindl → replaced by (Argentina) Julia Riera
- (Italy) Sara Errani → replaced by (Switzerland) Jenny Dürst
- (United States) Sofia Kenin → replaced by (Switzerland) Jil Teichmann
- (United States) Ashlyn Krueger → replaced by (Switzerland) Viktorija Golubic

== Doubles main draw entrants ==
=== Seeds ===
Country	Player	Country	Player	Rank^{†}	Seed
	Yana Sizikova	BEL	Kimberley Zimmermann	103	1
JPN	Eri Hozumi		Irina Khromacheva	145	2
HUN	Anna Bondár	FRA	Diane Parry	155	3
ESP	Aliona Bolsova	VEN	Andrea Gámiz	165	4

† Rankings are as of 17 July 2023
