= 1993 European Open-Lucerne =

- Date: 17–23 May
- Edition: 17th
- Category: Tier III
- Draw: 28S / 16D
- Prize money: $150,000
- Surface: Clay / outdoor
- Location: Lucerne, Switzerland
- Venue: Tennis Club Lido

Champions

Singles
- (United States) Lindsay Davenport

Doubles
- (United States) Mary Joe Fernández / (Czech Republic) Helena Suková
← 1992 ·	WTA Swiss Open	· 1994 →

The 1993 European Open-Lucerne was a women's tennis tournament played on outdoor clay courts at the Tennis Club Lido in Lucerne, Switzerland that was part of the Tier III category of the 1993 WTA Tour. It was the 17th edition of the tournament and was held from 17 May until 23 May 1993. Sixth-seeded Lindsay Davenport won the singles title and earned $27,000 first-prize money and 190 ranking points.

== Finals ==
=== Singles ===
(United States) Lindsay Davenport defeated (Australia) Nicole Provis 6–1, 4–6, 6–2

- It was Davenport's first singles title of her career.

=== Doubles ===
(United States) Mary Joe Fernández / (Czech Republic) Helena Suková defeated (United States) Lindsay Davenport / (United States) Marianne Werdel 6–2, 6–4
