= 2016 Ladies Championship Gstaad =

- Date: 11–17 July
- Edition: 24th
- Category: WTA International tournaments
- Draw: 32S / 16D
- Prize money: $250,000
- Surface: Clay / outdoor
- Location: Gstaad, Switzerland
- Venue: Roy Emerson Arena

Champions

Singles
- (Switzerland) Viktorija Golubic

Doubles
- (Spain) Lara Arruabarrena / (Switzerland) Xenia Knoll
← 1994 ·	WTA Swiss Open	· 2017 →

The 2016 Ladies Championship Gstaad was a women's tennis tournament played on outdoor clay courts. It was the 24th edition of the Ladies Championship Gstaad (but the first since 1994), and part of the International category of the 2016 WTA Tour. It took place at Roy Emerson Arena in Gstaad, Switzerland, from 11 July through 17 July 2016.

== Points and prize money ==
=== Point distribution ===
Event	W	F	SF	QF	Round of 16	Round of 32	Q	Q3	Q2	Q1
Singles	280	180	110	60	30	1	18	14	10	1
Doubles	280	180	110	60	1	—	—	—	—	—

=== Prize money ===
Event	W	F	SF	QF	Round of 16	Round of 32	Q2	Q1
Singles	$43,000	$21,400	$11,500	$6,175	$3,400	$2,100	$1,020	$600
Doubles	$12,300	$6,400	$3,435	$1,820	$960	—	—	—

== Singles main draw entrants ==
=== Seeds ===
Country	Player	Rank^{1}	Seed
SUI	Timea Bacsinszky	11	1
SRB	Jelena Janković	24	2
NED	Kiki Bertens	28	3
FRA	Caroline Garcia	32	4
GER	Annika Beck	43	5
SWE	Johanna Larsson	54	6
GER	Mona Barthel	68	7
GER	Julia Görges	78	8

- ^{1} Rankings are as of 27 June 2016.

=== Other entrants ===
The following players received wildcards into the main draw:

- (Serbia) Jelena Janković
- (Switzerland) Rebeka Masarova
- (Switzerland) Patty Schnyder

The following players received entry from the qualifying draw:

- (France) Claire Feuerstein
- (Austria) Barbara Haas
- (Tunisia) Ons Jabeur
- (Luxembourg) Mandy Minella
- (Switzerland) Amra Sadiković
- (Spain) Sara Sorribes Tormo

=== Withdrawals ===
Before the tournament

- (Spain) Lourdes Domínguez Lino → replaced by (New Zealand) Marina Erakovic
- (Australia) Daria Gavrilova → replaced by (Slovakia) Jana Čepelová
- (United States) Christina McHale → replaced by (Czech Republic) Lucie Hradecká
- (Spain) Carla Suárez Navarro → replaced by (Russia) Irina Khromacheva

== Doubles main draw entrants ==
=== Seeds ===
Country	Player	Country	Player	Rank^{1}	Seed
GER	Julia Görges	USA	Bethanie Mattek-Sands	24	1
NED	Kiki Bertens	SWE	Johanna Larsson	70	2
ESP	Lara Arruabarrena	SUI	Xenia Knoll	103	3
UKR	Lyudmyla Kichenok	UKR	Nadiia Kichenok	135	4

- ^{1} Rankings are as of 27 June 2016.

=== Withdrawals ===
During the tournament

- (Sweden) Johanna Larsson (Left Calf Injury)

== Finals ==
=== Singles ===
- (Switzerland) Viktorija Golubic defeated (Netherlands) Kiki Bertens, 4–6, 6–3, 6–4

=== Doubles ===
- (Spain) Lara Arruabarrena / (Switzerland) Xenia Knoll defeated (Germany) Annika Beck / (Russia) Evgeniya Rodina, 6–1, 3–6, [10–8]
