= 2022 Ladies Open Lausanne =

- Date: 11 – 17 July
- Edition: 29th
- Category: WTA 250
- Draw: 32S / 16D
- Prize money: $ 251,750
- Surface: Clay
- Location: Lausanne, Switzerland
- Venue: Tennis Club Stade-Lausanne

Champions

Singles
- (Croatia) Petra Martić

Doubles
- (Serbia) Olga Danilović / (France) Kristina Mladenovic
← 2021 ·	WTA Swiss Open	· 2023 →

The 2022 Ladies Open Lausanne was a women's tennis tournament played on outdoor clay courts. It was the 29th edition of the Ladies Open Lausanne, and part of the 250 category of the 2022 WTA Tour. It took place at Tennis Club Stade-Lausanne in Lausanne, Switzerland, from 11 through 17 July 2022.

== Champions ==
=== Singles ===
- (Croatia) Petra Martić def. (Serbia) Olga Danilović, 6–4, 6–2

This is Martić's second singles career title and first of the year.

=== Doubles ===
- (Serbia) Olga Danilović / (France) Kristina Mladenovic def. (Norway) Ulrikke Eikeri / (Slovenia) Tamara Zidanšek, walkover

== Singles main draw entrants ==
=== Seeds ===
Country	Player	Rank^{†}	Seed
USA	Danielle Collins	8	1
SUI	Belinda Bencic	16	2
ROU	Irina-Camelia Begu	43	3
ESP	Sara Sorribes Tormo	45	4
ESP	Nuria Párrizas Díaz	51	5
FRA	Caroline Garcia	55	6
SLO	Tamara Zidanšek	60	7
	Varvara Gracheva	69	8

^{†} Rankings are as of 27 June 2022

=== Other entrants ===
The following players received wildcard entry into the singles main draw:

- (Switzerland) Susan Bandecchi
- (France) Kristina Mladenovic
- (Switzerland) Simona Waltert

The following players received entry from the qualifying draw:

- Erika Andreeva
- Anna Blinkova
- (Spain) Cristina Bucșa
- (Serbia) Olga Danilović
- (France) Léolia Jeanjean
- (Germany) Eva Lys

=== Withdrawals ===
Before the tournament

- (France) Alizé Cornet → replaced by (Japan) Misaki Doi
- (Italy) Camila Giorgi → replaced by (United States) Lauren Davis
- Daria Kasatkina → replaced by (Germany) Tamara Korpatsch
- (Ukraine) Dayana Yastremska → replaced by (Germany) Jule Niemeier
- (Belgium) Maryna Zanevska → replaced by (China) Zhu Lin

During the tournament

- (Germany) Tatjana Maria (left hip injury)

== Doubles main draw entrants ==
=== Seeds ===
Country	Player	Country	Player	Rank^{†}	Seed
CHI	Alexa Guarachi	USA	Asia Muhammad	65	1
NOR	Ulrikke Eikeri	SLO	Tamara Zidanšek	118	2
	Anna Kalinskaya	ROU	Raluca Olaru	121	3
TPE	Chan Hao-ching	TPE	Latisha Chan	145	4

† Rankings are as of 27 June 2022

=== Other entrants ===
The following pairs received wildcard entry into main draw:

- (Switzerland) Susan Bandecchi / (Switzerland) Simona Waltert
- (Switzerland) Ylena In-Albon / (Switzerland) Xenia Knoll

=== Withdrawals ===
Before the tournament

- (Australia) Monique Adamczak / (Netherlands) Rosalie van der Hoek → replaced by (Netherlands) Arianne Hartono / (Netherlands) Rosalie van der Hoek

During the tournament

- Anna Kalinskaya / (Romania) Raluca Olaru (Kalinskaya - right ankle injury)
- (Norway) Ulrikke Eikeri / (Slovenia) Tamara Zidanšek (Zidanšek - COVID19 illness)
