= 1992 Lucerne Ladies European Open – Doubles =

Doubles
- 1992 Lucerne Ladies European Open

Final
- Champions: (United States) Amy Frazier (South Africa) Elna Reinach
- Runners-up: (Czechoslovakia) Karina Habšudová (United States) Marianne Werdel
- Score: 7–5, 6–2

Details
- Draw: 16 (1Q)
- Seeds: 4

Events
Singles	Doubles
← 1991 ·	WTA Swiss Open	· 1993 →

Nicole Provis and Elizabeth Smylie were the defending champions, but Smylie did not compete this year. Provis teamed up with Rennae Stubbs and lost in the semifinals to Karina Habšudová and Marianne Werdel.

Amy Frazier and Elna Reinach won the title by defeating Habšudová and Werdel 7–5, 6–2 in the final.

== Seeds ==
1. (Australia) Nicole Provis / (Australia) Rennae Stubbs (semifinals)
2. (United States) Amy Frazier / (South Africa) Elna Reinach (champions)
3. (Japan) Maya Kidowaki / (Czechoslovakia) Radka Zrubáková (first round)
4. (Czechoslovakia) Karina Habšudová / (United States) Marianne Werdel (final)

== Draw ==
=== Key ===
- Q = Qualifier
- WC = Wild card
- LL = Lucky loser
- Alt = Alternate
- SE = Special exempt
- PR = Protected ranking
- ITF = ITF entry
- JE = Junior exempt
- w/o = Walkover
- r = Retired
- d = Defaulted
- SR = Special ranking

=== Draw ===
First round
1	(Australia) N Provis (Australia) R Stubbs	6	1	7^{7}
(United States) L Davenport (United States) C Rubin	0	6	6^{4}
(Czechoslovakia) I Jankovská (Czechoslovakia) E Melicharová	3	6	6
(Mexico) L Novelo (Canada) R Simpson-Alter	6	4	3
4	(Czechoslovakia) K Habšudová (United States) M Werdel	6	6
(United States) P O'Reilly (United States) Terri O'Reilly	3	1
(Switzerland) M Strebel (Switzerland) N Tschan	6	6
(United States) L Harvey Wild (United States) T Whitlinger	2	3
Q	(Italy) F Bonsignori (Germany) K Oeljeklaus	6	6
(Czechoslovakia) R Maršíková (Switzerland) Denise Sukup	0	3
(South Africa) A Coetzer (Argentina) I Gorrochategui	6	6
3	(Japan) M Kidowaki (Czechoslovakia) R Zrubáková	1	2
(Czechoslovakia) K Kroupová (Czechoslovakia) A Noháčová	6	7
(Czechoslovakia) I Havrlíková (Czechoslovakia) H Vildová	3	5
(Soviet Union) E Likhovtseva (United States) T Morton	7	1	2
2	(United States) A Frazier (South Africa) E Reinach	5	6	6

Quarterfinals
1	(Australia) N Provis (Australia) R Stubbs	7	6
(Czechoslovakia) I Jankovská (Czechoslovakia) E Melicharová	5	3
4	(Czechoslovakia) K Habšudová (United States) M Werdel	6	6
(Switzerland) M Strebel (Switzerland) N Tschan	4	2
Q	(Italy) F Bonsignori (Germany) K Oeljeklaus	1	1
(South Africa) A Coetzer (Argentina) I Gorrochategui	6	6
(Czechoslovakia) K Kroupová (Czechoslovakia) A Noháčová	7^{8}	1	1
2	(United States) A Frazier (South Africa) E Reinach	6^{6}	6	6

Semifinals
1	(Australia) N Provis (Australia) R Stubbs	4	6^{8}
4	(Czechoslovakia) K Habšudová (United States) M Werdel	6	7^{10}
(South Africa) A Coetzer (Argentina) I Gorrochategui	1	3
2	(United States) A Frazier (South Africa) E Reinach	6	6

Final
4	(Czechoslovakia) K Habšudová (United States) M Werdel	5	2
2	(United States) A Frazier (South Africa) E Reinach	7	6
