= 1992 Lucerne Ladies European Open – Singles =

Singles
- 1992 Lucerne Ladies European Open
- 1991 Champion: (Switzerland) Manuela Maleeva-Fragnière

Final
- Champion: (United States) Amy Frazier
- Runner-up: (Czechoslovakia) Radka Zrubáková
- Score: 6–4, 4–6, 7–5

Details
- Draw: 28 (2WC/4Q)
- Seeds: 8

Events
Singles	Doubles
← 1991 ·	WTA Swiss Open	· 1993 →

Manuela Maleeva-Fragnière was the defending champion, but lost in the second round to Sabine Hack.

Amy Frazier won the title by defeating Radka Zrubáková 6–4, 4–6, 7–5 in the final.

== Seeds ==
The first four seeds received a bye into the second round.

1. (Switzerland) Manuela Maleeva-Fragnière (second round)
2. (United States) Amy Frazier (champion)
3. (Czechoslovakia) Radka Zrubáková (final)
4. (South Africa) Amanda Coetzer (quarterfinals)
5. (Bulgaria) Manuela Maleeva (quarterfinals)
6. (Australia) Nicole Provis (second round)
7. (Czechoslovakia) Karina Habšudová (first round)
8. (Argentina) Inés Gorrochategui (first round)

== Draw ==
=== Key ===
- Q = Qualifier
- WC = Wild card
- LL = Lucky loser
- Alt = Alternate
- SE = Special exempt
- PR = Protected ranking
- ITF = ITF entry
- JE = Junior exempt
- w/o = Walkover
- r = Retired
- d = Defaulted
- SR = Special ranking

=== Finals ===
Semifinals
(Switzerland) Emanuela Zardo	4	4
3	(Czechoslovakia) Radka Zrubáková	6	6
WC	(Switzerland) Christelle Fauche	6^{5}	2
2	(United States) Amy Frazier	7^{7}	6

Final
3	(Czechoslovakia) Radka Zrubáková	4	6	5
2	(United States) Amy Frazier	6	4	7

=== Top half ===
First round
(Germany) S Hack	6	6
(Japan) M Kidowaki	2	1
(France) A Dechaume	6	6^{3}	7
(Canada) R Simpson-Alter	4	7^{7}	5
(Switzerland) E Zardo	6^{4}	6	6
8	(Argentina) I Gorrochategui	7^{7}	3	2
(Italy) L Ferrando	6	6
Q	(United States) L Davenport	3	1
(United States) C Rubin	6^{3}	4
Q	(Mexico) L Novelo	7^{7}	6
(South Africa) E Reinach	1	4
5	(Bulgaria) M Maleeva	6	6

Second round
1	(Switzerland) M Maleeva-Fragnière	4	3
(Germany) S Hack	6	6
(France) A Dechaume	3	3
(Switzerland) E Zardo	6	6
3	(Czechoslovakia) R Zrubáková	4	6	5
(Italy) L Ferrando	6	2	3^{r}
Q	(Mexico) L Novelo	3	3
5	(Bulgaria) M Maleeva	6	6

Quarterfinals
(Germany) S Hack	5	5
(Switzerland) E Zardo	7	7
3	(Czechoslovakia) R Zrubáková	3	6	6
5	(Bulgaria) M Maleeva	6	1	4

Semifinals
(Switzerland) E Zardo	4	4
3	(Czechoslovakia) R Zrubáková	6	6

=== Bottom half ===
First round
6	(Australia) N Provis	6	6
(Germany) C Porwik	3	1
(Italy) F Bonsignori	0	1
WC	(Switzerland) C Fauche	6	6
Q	(Switzerland) N Tschan	4	6	3
WC	(Croatia) N Ercegović	6	1	6
7	(Czechoslovakia) K Habšudová	6	3	4
(United States) T Whitlinger	1	6	6
Q	(Germany) K Oeljeklaus	6	5	0
(United States) L Harvey Wild	3	7	6
(Czechoslovakia) K Kroupová	6	6
(United States) M Werdel	2	3

Second round
6	(Australia) N Provis	2	3
WC	(Switzerland) C Fauche	6	6
WC	(Croatia) N Ercegović	2	1
4	(South Africa) A Coetzer	6	6
(United States) T Whitlinger	1	3
(United States) L Harvey Wild	6	6
(Czechoslovakia) K Kroupová	6^{5}	0
2	(United States) A Frazier	7^{7}	6

Quarterfinals
WC	(Switzerland) C Fauche	6	3	6
4	(South Africa) A Coetzer	2	6	2
(United States) L Harvey Wild	3	0
2	(United States) A Frazier	6	6

Semifinals
WC	(Switzerland) C Fauche	6^{5}	2
2	(United States) A Frazier	7^{7}	6
