= 1994 European Open-Lucerne =

- Date: 16–21 May
- Edition: 18th
- Category: Tier III
- Draw: 28S / 16D
- Prize money: $150,000
- Surface: Clay / outdoor
- Location: Lucerne, Switzerland
- Venue: Tennis Club Lido

Champions

Singles
- (United States) Lindsay Davenport

Doubles
- Final not played
← 1993 ·	WTA Swiss Open	· 1995 →

The 1994 European Open-Lucerne was a women's tennis tournament played on outdoor clay courts at the Tennis Club Lido in Lucerne, Switzerland that was part of the Tier III category of the 1994 WTA Tour. It was the 18th edition of the tournament and was held from 16 May until 21 May 1994. First-seeded Lindsay Davenport won her second consecutive singles title and earned $27,000 first-prize money.

== Finals ==
=== Singles ===
(United States) Lindsay Davenport defeated (United States) Lisa Raymond 7–6^{(7–3)}, 6–4

- It was Davenport's 2nd and last singles title of the year and the 3rd of her career.

=== Doubles ===
Final cancelled due to rain.
