= 1993 European Open-Lucerne – Singles =

Singles
- 1993 European Open-Lucerne
- 1992 Champion: (United States) Amy Frazier

Final
- Champion: (United States) Lindsay Davenport
- Runner-up: (Australia) Nicole Provis
- Score: 6–1, 4–6, 6–2

Details
- Draw: 28 (2WC/4Q)
- Seeds: 8

Events
Singles	Doubles
← 1992 ·	WTA Swiss Open	· 1994 →

Amy Frazier was the defending champion, but did not compete this year. Lindsay Davenport won the title by defeating Nicole Provis 6–1, 4–6, 6–2 in the final.

== Seeds ==
The first four seeds receive a bye into the second round.

1. (Switzerland) Manuela Maleeva-Fragnière (quarterfinals)
2. (Czech Republic) Helena Suková (quarterfinals)
3. (Germany) Sabine Hack (semifinals)
4. (Australia) Nicole Provis (final)
5. (Slovakia) Radomira Zrubáková (second round)
6. (United States) Lindsay Davenport (champion)
7. (United States) Linda Harvey Wild (first round)
8. (United States) Debbie Graham (second round)

== Draw ==
=== Key ===
- Q = Qualifier
- WC = Wild card
- LL = Lucky loser
- Alt = Alternate
- SE = Special exempt
- PR = Protected ranking
- ITF = ITF entry
- JE = Junior exempt
- w/o = Walkover
- r = Retired
- d = Defaulted
- SR = Special ranking

=== Finals ===
Semifinals
(Italy) Linda Ferrando	3	2
4	(Australia) Nicole Provis	6	6
3	(Germany) Sabine Hack	2	7^{8}	1
6	(United States) Lindsay Davenport	6	6^{6}	6

Final
4	(Australia) Nicole Provis	1	6	2
6	(United States) Lindsay Davenport	6	4	6

=== Top half ===
First round
WC	(Switzerland) J Manta	2	1
(South Africa) E Reinach	6	6
(Italy) F Bonsignori	1	5
(Italy) L Ferrando	6	7
(United States) J Watanabe	2	2
8	(United States) D Graham	6	6
Q	(Mexico) L Novelo	1	1
(France) N van Lottum	6	6
(Germany) C Porwik	5	6	6
(Italy) K Piccolini	7	4	0
(Canada) H Kelesi	3	6	3
5	(Slovakia) R Zrubáková	6	0	6

Second round
1	(Switzerland) M Maleeva-Fragnière	6	7^{7}
(South Africa) E Reinach	3	6^{2}
(Italy) L Ferrando	3	6	6
8	(United States) D Graham	6	2	3
4	(Australia) N Provis	6	6
(France) N van Lottum	1	2
(Germany) C Porwik	6	6
5	(Slovakia) R Zrubáková	1	2

Quarterfinals
1	(Switzerland) M Maleeva-Fragnière	4	7	4
(Italy) L Ferrando	6	5	6
4	(Australia) N Provis	7	6
(Germany) C Porwik	5	4

Semifinals
(Italy) L Ferrando	3	2
4	(Australia) N Provis	6	6

=== Bottom half ===
First round
7	(United States) L Harvey Wild	6	5	2
(United States) C Kuhlman	2	7	6
Q	(United States) P O'Reilly	6	6^{5}	6
Q	(Croatia) S Talaja	4	7^{7}	4
Q	(Netherlands) K Boogert	2	6	4
(Germany) M Babel	6	1	6
6	(United States) L Davenport	6	4	6
WC	(United States) M McGrath	4	6	1
(United States) M Werdel	6	6
(Switzerland) E Zardo	2	3
(France) C Mothes	7	6^{3}	6
(United States) K Po	5	7^{7}	2

Second round
(United States) C Kuhlman	7^{7}	6
Q	(United States) P O'Reilly	6^{4}	2
(Germany) M Babel	4	1
3	(Germany) S Hack	6	6
6	(United States) L Davenport	6	6
(United States) M Werdel	3	0
(France) C Mothes	5	1
2	(Czech Republic) H Suková	7	6

Quarterfinals
(United States) C Kuhlman	0	7	2
3	(Germany) S Hack	6	5	6
6	(United States) L Davenport	7	6
2	(Czech Republic) H Suková	5	2

Semifinals
3	(Germany) S Hack	2	7^{8}	1
6	(United States) L Davenport	6	6^{6}	6
