= 2016 Ladies Championship Gstaad – Singles =

Singles
- 2016 Ladies Championship Gstaad

Final
- Champion: (Switzerland) Viktorija Golubic
- Runner-up: (Netherlands) Kiki Bertens
- Score: 4–6, 6–3, 6–4

Events
Singles	Doubles
- Ladies Championship Gstaad

This is the first edition of the tournament since 1994.

Viktorija Golubic won her first WTA title, defeating Kiki Bertens in the final, 4–6, 6–3, 6–4.

== Seeds ==
1. (Switzerland) Timea Bacsinszky (semifinals)
2. (Serbia) Jelena Janković (first round)
3. (Netherlands) Kiki Bertens (final)
4. (France) Caroline Garcia (first round)
5. (Germany) Annika Beck (quarterfinals)
6. (Sweden) Johanna Larsson (quarterfinals)
7. (Germany) Mona Barthel (first round)
8. (Germany) Julia Görges (second round)

== Draw ==
Key

- Q = Qualifier
- WC = Wild card
- LL = Lucky loser
- Alt = Alternate
- ITF = ITF entry
- PR = Protected ranking
- SR = Special ranking
- SE = Special exempt
- JE = Junior exempt
- JR = Junior Accelerator Programme entrant
- CO = College Accelerator Programme entrant
- NG = Next Gen Accelerator Program entrant
- w/o = Walkover
- r = Retired
- d = Defaulted

=== Finals ===
Semifinals
1	(Switzerland) Timea Bacsinszky	5	6^{1}
3	(Netherlands) Kiki Bertens	7	7^{7}
(Switzerland) Viktorija Golubic	6	6
WC	(Switzerland) Rebeka Masarova	3	2

Final
3	(Netherlands) Kiki Bertens	6	3	4
(Switzerland) Viktorija Golubic	4	6	6

=== Top half ===
First round
1	(Switzerland) T Bacsinszky	6	6
Q	(Spain) S Sorribes Tormo	3	2
Q	(Luxembourg) M Minella	4	7^{7}	6
Q	(Tunisia) O Jabeur	6	6^{5}	4
(Sweden) R Peterson	2	6	3
Q	(Switzerland) A Sadiković	6	3	6
(United States) B Mattek-Sands	5	2
6	(Sweden) J Larsson	7	6
3	(Netherlands) K Bertens	5	6	6
(Austria) T Paszek	7	2	4
Q	(France) C Feuerstein	2	6	6
(Spain) S Soler Espinosa	6	2	0
(Czech Republic) L Hradecká	2	5
(Russia) I Khromacheva	6	7
(Slovakia) J Čepelová	0	3
8	(Germany) J Görges	6	6

Second round
1	(Switzerland) T Bacsinszky	6	6
Q	(Luxembourg) M Minella	2	2
Q	(Switzerland) A Sadiković	3	4
6	(Sweden) J Larsson	6	6
3	(Netherlands) K Bertens	7^{11}	6
Q	(France) C Feuerstein	6^{9}	1
(Russia) I Khromacheva	7	6
8	(Germany) J Görges	5	3

Quarterfinals
1	(Switzerland) T Bacsinszky	6	6
6	(Sweden) J Larsson	0	1
3	(Netherlands) K Bertens	6	6
(Russia) I Khromacheva	3	1

Semifinals
1	(Switzerland) T Bacsinszky	5	6^{1}
3	(Netherlands) K Bertens	7	7^{7}

=== Bottom half ===
First round
7	(Germany) M Barthel	6	1	5
(Switzerland) V Golubic	2	6	7
(Russia) E Rodina	6	7^{10}
Q	(Austria) B Haas	3	6^{8}
(Germany) C Witthöft	6	4	6
(Switzerland) S Vögele	4	6	1
(Spain) L Arruabarrena	6^{5}	6	6
4	(France) C Garcia	7^{7}	1	4
5	(Germany) A Beck	3	6	7
(New Zealand) M Erakovic	6	2	5
WC	(Switzerland) P Schnyder	6	5	4
(Czech Republic) K Siniaková	2	7	6
(Greece) M Sakkari	5	1
(Estonia) A Kontaveit	7	6
WC	(Switzerland) R Masarova	1	6	6
2/WC	(Serbia) J Janković	6	4	2

Second round
(Switzerland) V Golubic	7	6
(Russia) E Rodina	5	1
(Germany) C Witthöft	6	7^{9}
(Spain) L Arruabarrena	1	6^{7}
5	(Germany) A Beck	6	6
(Czech Republic) K Siniaková	2	1
(Estonia) A Kontaveit	6^{2}	6	2
WC	(Switzerland) R Masarova	7^{7}	4	6

Quarterfinals
(Switzerland) V Golubic	7^{7}	7^{7}
(Germany) C Witthöft	6^{4}	6^{4}
5	(Germany) A Beck	5	2
WC	(Switzerland) R Masarova	7	6

Semifinals
(Switzerland) V Golubic	6	6
WC	(Switzerland) R Masarova	3	2

== Qualifying ==
=== Seeds ===
1. (Luxembourg) Mandy Minella (qualified)
2. (Belgium) Elise Mertens (first round)
3. (Spain) Sara Sorribes Tormo (qualified)
4. (France) Océane Dodin (withdrew, still competing in Contrexéville)
5. (Switzerland) Amra Sadiković (qualified)
6. (Austria) Barbara Haas (qualified)
7. (France) Alizé Lim (qualifying competition)
8. (France) Amandine Hesse (first round)
9. (France) Virginie Razzano (qualifying competition, retired)
10. (Tunisia) Ons Jabeur (qualified)
11. (Czech Republic) Jesika Malečková (first round)
12. (France) Fiona Ferro (first round)

=== Qualifiers ===
1. (Luxembourg) Mandy Minella
2. (Tunisia) Ons Jabeur
3. (Spain) Sara Sorribes Tormo
4. (France) Claire Feuerstein
5. (Switzerland) Amra Sadiković
6. (Austria) Barbara Haas

=== Draw ===
==== First qualifier ====
First round
1	(Luxembourg) Mandy Minella	6	6
(Bulgaria) Aleksandrina Naydenova	1	2
(Switzerland) Jil Teichmann	6	6
8	(France) Amandine Hesse	4	2

Qualifying competition
1	(Luxembourg) Mandy Minella	6	6
(Switzerland) Jil Teichmann	4	3

==== Second qualifier ====
First round
2	(Belgium) Elise Mertens	5	3
(Liechtenstein) Kathinka von Deichmann	7	6
(Venezuela) Andrea Gámiz	5	1
10	(Tunisia) Ons Jabeur	7	6

Qualifying competition
(Liechtenstein) Kathinka von Deichmann	4	7^{8}	3
10	(Tunisia) Ons Jabeur	6	6^{6}	6

==== Third qualifier ====
First round
3	(Spain) Sara Sorribes Tormo	6	6
(Austria) Julia Grabher	3	2
(Germany) Tamara Korpatsch	6	6
12	(France) Fiona Ferro	4	4

Qualifying competition
3	(Spain) Sara Sorribes Tormo	6	6
(Germany) Tamara Korpatsch	1	1

==== Fourth qualifier ====
First round
Alt	(Russia) Ekaterina Yashina	0	0
WC	(Switzerland) Xenia Knoll	6	6
PR	(France) Claire Feuerstein	6	7
11	(Czech Republic) Jesika Malečková	3	5

Qualifying competition
WC	(Switzerland) Xenia Knoll	3	3
PR	(France) Claire Feuerstein	6	6

==== Fifth qualifier ====
First round
5	(Switzerland) Amra Sadiković	6	4	6
WC	(Switzerland) Tess Sugnaux	2	6	4
(Ukraine) Lyudmyla Kichenok	2	2
9	(France) Virginie Razzano	6	6

Qualifying competition
5	(Switzerland) Amra Sadiković	6	0
9	(France) Virginie Razzano	2	0^{r}

==== Sixth qualifier ====
First round
6	(Austria) Barbara Haas	6	6
(Liechtenstein) Stephanie Vogt	2	3
(Ukraine) Nadiia Kichenok	1	2
7	(France) Alizé Lim	6	6

Qualifying competition
6	(Austria) Barbara Haas	6	1	7
7	(France) Alizé Lim	2	6	5
