= 2016 Ladies Championship Gstaad – Doubles =

Doubles
- 2016 Ladies Championship Gstaad

Final
- Champions: (Spain) Lara Arruabarrena (Switzerland) Xenia Knoll
- Runners-up: (Germany) Annika Beck (Russia) Evgeniya Rodina
- Score: 6–1, 3–6, [10–8]

Events
Singles	Doubles
Ladies Championship Gstaad	· 2017 →

This was the first edition of the tournament since 1994. Lara Arruabarrena and Xenia Knoll won the title, defeating Annika Beck and Evgeniya Rodina in the final, 6–1, 3–6, [10–8].

== Seeds ==
The top seed received a bye into the quarterfinals.

1. (Germany) Julia Görges / (United States) Bethanie Mattek-Sands (quarterfinals)
2. (Netherlands) Kiki Bertens / (Sweden) Johanna Larsson (semifinals, withdrew)
3. (Spain) Lara Arruabarrena / (Switzerland) Xenia Knoll (champions)
4. (Ukraine) Lyudmyla Kichenok / (Ukraine) Nadiia Kichenok (quarterfinals)

== Draw ==
=== Key ===
- Q = Qualifier
- WC = Wild card
- LL = Lucky loser
- Alt = Alternate
- SE = Special exempt
- PR = Protected ranking
- ITF = ITF entry
- JE = Junior exempt
- w/o = Walkover
- r = Retired
- d = Defaulted
- SR = Special ranking

=== Draw ===
First round
(United Kingdom) J Rae (United Kingdom) A Smith	3	6	[11]
(Spain) S Soler Espinosa (Liechtenstein) S Vogt	6	4	[9]
3	(Spain) L Arruabarrena (Switzerland) X Knoll	6	7^{7}
(Japan) K Hisami (Japan) K Takahata	0	6^{1}
(Belgium) E Mertens (Bulgaria) A Naydenova	6	6
(Venezuela) A Gámiz (Switzerland) J Teichmann	4	3
(Russia) I Khromacheva (Netherlands) D Schuurs	1	4
(Germany) A Beck (Russia) E Rodina	6	6
(Switzerland) T Bacsinszky (Switzerland) V Golubic	3	4
4	(Ukraine) L Kichenok (Ukraine) N Kichenok	6	6
(France) S Foretz (France) A Hesse	6	6
(Germany) T Korpatsch (Russia) E Yashina	4	2
(Luxembourg) M Minella (Switzerland) A Sadiković	4	5
2	(Netherlands) K Bertens (Sweden) J Larsson	6	7

Quarterfinals
1	(Germany) J Görges (United States) B Mattek-Sands	6^{3}	1
(United Kingdom) J Rae (United Kingdom) A Smith	7^{7}	6
3	(Spain) L Arruabarrena (Switzerland) X Knoll	3	6	[11]
(Belgium) E Mertens (Bulgaria) A Naydenova	6	1	[9]
(Germany) A Beck (Russia) E Rodina	4	6	[10]
4	(Ukraine) L Kichenok (Ukraine) N Kichenok	6	3	[7]
(France) S Foretz (France) A Hesse	3	2
2	(Netherlands) K Bertens (Sweden) J Larsson	6	6

Semifinals
(United Kingdom) J Rae (United Kingdom) A Smith	3	6	[7]
3	(Spain) L Arruabarrena (Switzerland) X Knoll	6	3	[10]
(Germany) A Beck (Russia) E Rodina	w/o
2	(Netherlands) K Bertens (Sweden) J Larsson

Final
3	(Spain) L Arruabarrena (Switzerland) X Knoll	6	3	[10]
(Germany) A Beck (Russia) E Rodina	1	6	[8]
