= 1993 European Open-Lucerne – Doubles =

Doubles
- 1993 European Open-Lucerne

Final
- Champions: (United States) Mary Joe Fernández; (Czech Republic) Helena Suková
- Runners-up: (United States) Lindsay Davenport; (United States) Marianne Werdel
- Score: 6–2, 6–4

Details
- Draw: 16 (1WC/1Q)
- Seeds: 4

Events
| Singles | Doubles |
| ← 1992 · | WTA Swiss Open | · 1994 → |

Amy Frazier and Elna Reinach were the defending champions, but Frazier did not compete this year. Reinach teamed up with Elizabeth Smylie and lost in the semifinals to Lindsay Davenport and Marianne Werdel.

Mary Joe Fernández and Helena Suková won the title by defeating Davenport and Werdel 6–2, 6–4 in the final.

== Seeds ==
1. (United States) Mary Joe Fernández / (Czech Republic) Helena Suková (champions)
2. (South Africa) Elna Reinach / (Australia) Elizabeth Smylie (semifinals)
3. (United States) Debbie Graham / (Netherlands) Brenda Schultz (first round)
4. (United States) Linda Harvey Wild / (Australia) Nicole Provis (semifinals)

== Draw ==
=== Key ===
- Q = Qualifier
- WC = Wild card
- LL = Lucky loser
- Alt = Alternate
- SE = Special exempt
- PR = Protected ranking
- ITF = ITF entry
- JE = Junior exempt
- w/o = Walkover
- r = Retired
- d = Defaulted
- SR = Special ranking

=== Draw ===
First round

Quarterfinals

Semifinals

Final

1
(United States) MJ Fernández
(Czech Republic) H Suková
6
6

Q
- (Switzerland) G Dondit
- (United Kingdom) L Woodroffe
0
3

1
(United States) MJ Fernández
(Czech Republic) H Suková
6
6

- (Austria) S Reichel
- (Czech Republic) H Vildová
3
1

- (Netherlands) I Driehuis
- (Mexico) L Novelo
2
2

(Netherlands) I Driehuis
(Mexico) L Novelo
6
6

1
(United States) MJ Fernández
(Czech Republic) H Suková
7
7

4
(United States) L Harvey Wild
(Australia) N Provis
6
3
6

4
- (United States) L Harvey Wild
- (Australia) N Provis
5
5

WC
- (Croatia) I Majoli
- (United States) B Nagelsen
2
6
2

4
(United States) L Harvey Wild
(Australia) N Provis
6
6

- (United States) C Kuhlman
- (Switzerland) N Tschan
2
6^{5}

- (France) N van Lottum
- (Slovakia) R Zrubáková
4
2

(France) N van Lottum
(Slovakia) R Zrubáková
6
7^{7}

1
(United States) MJ Fernández
(Czech Republic) H Suková
6
6

(Australia) J Hodder
(Australia) K Sharpe
w/o

- (United States) L Davenport
- (United States) M Werdel
2
4

- (United States) L Glitz
- (Poland) M Mróz

- (Australia) J Hodder
- (Australia) K Sharpe
2
3

(United States) L Davenport
(United States) M Werdel
4
6
7

(United States) L Davenport
(United States) M Werdel
6
6

3
- (United States) D Graham
- (Netherlands) B Schultz
6
0
5

(United States) L Davenport
(United States) M Werdel
6
6

- (United States) P O'Reilly
- (United States) K Po
4
2

2
- (South Africa) E Reinach
- (Australia) E Smylie
3
3

(Czech Republic) I Jankovská
(Czech Republic) E Melicharová
6
6

- (Czech Republic) I Jankovská
- (Czech Republic) E Melicharová

- (Germany) M Babel
- (Switzerland) E Zardo
5
1

2
(South Africa) E Reinach
(Australia) E Smylie
w/o

2
(South Africa) E Reinach
(Australia) E Smylie
7
6
