= 2017 Wimbledon Championships – Women's singles =

Women's singles
- 2017 Wimbledon Championships

Final
- Champion: (Spain) Garbiñe Muguruza
- Runner-up: (United States) Venus Williams
- Score: 7–5, 6–0

Details
- Draw: 128 (12 Q / 6 WC )
- Seeds: 32

Events
Singles	men	women		boys	girls
Doubles	men	women	mixed	boys	girls
WC Singles	men	women	quad
WC Doubles	men	women	quad
Legends	men	women	seniors
← 2016 ·	Wimbledon Championships	· 2018 →

Garbiñe Muguruza defeated Venus Williams in the final, 7–5, 6–0 to win the ladies' singles tennis title at the 2017 Wimbledon Championships. It was her second and last major singles title overall, having also won the 2016 French Open.

Serena Williams was the two-time reigning champion, but did not participate due to pregnancy.

Venus Williams was the oldest player to reach the final since Martina Navratilova in 1994, and played her 100th Wimbledon singles match in the quarterfinals; it was her first Wimbledon final since 2009 and (by virtue of her run to that year's earlier Australian Open final) marked the first time she reached multiple major finals in a calendar year since 2003. Johanna Konta was the first Briton to reach the semifinals since Virginia Wade in 1978, and Magdaléna Rybáriková was the first Slovak to reach the semifinals.

Despite losing in the second round, Karolína Plíšková attained the world No. 1 singles ranking, after Angelique Kerber and Simona Halep lost in the fourth round and quarterfinals, respectively.

This tournament marked the major main draw debuts of future US Open champion Bianca Andreescu and four-time major champion and world No. 1 Aryna Sabalenka. They lost to Kristína Kučová and Carina Witthöft in the first and second rounds, respectively. This was also the first Wimbledon main draw appearance of future champion Markéta Vondroušová; she lost in the first round to Peng Shuai.

== Seeds ==
1. (Germany) Angelique Kerber (fourth round)
2. (Romania) Simona Halep (quarterfinals)
3. (Czech Republic) Karolína Plíšková (second round)
4. (Ukraine) Elina Svitolina (fourth round)
5. (Denmark) Caroline Wozniacki (fourth round)
6. (United Kingdom) Johanna Konta (semifinals)
7. (Russia) Svetlana Kuznetsova (quarterfinals)
8. (Slovakia) Dominika Cibulková (third round)
9. (Poland) Agnieszka Radwańska (fourth round)
10. (United States) Venus Williams (final)
11. (Czech Republic) Petra Kvitová (second round)
12. (France) Kristina Mladenovic (second round)
13. (Latvia) Jeļena Ostapenko (quarterfinals)
14. (Spain) Garbiñe Muguruza (champion)
15. (Russia) Elena Vesnina (second round)
16. (Russia) Anastasia Pavlyuchenkova (first round)

17. (United States) Madison Keys (second round)
18. (Latvia) Anastasija Sevastova (second round)
19. (Switzerland) Timea Bacsinszky (third round)
20. (Australia) Daria Gavrilova (first round)
21. (France) Caroline Garcia (fourth round)
22. (Czech Republic) Barbora Strýcová (second round)
23. (Netherlands) Kiki Bertens (first round)
24. (United States) CoCo Vandeweghe (quarterfinals)
25. (Spain) Carla Suárez Navarro (second round)
26. (Croatia) Mirjana Lučić-Baroni (first round)
27. (Croatia) Ana Konjuh (fourth round)
28. (United States) Lauren Davis (first round)
29. (Russia) Daria Kasatkina (second round)
30. (China) Zhang Shuai (first round)
31. (Italy) Roberta Vinci (first round)
32. (Czech Republic) Lucie Šafářová (second round)

Click on the seed number of a player to go to their draw section.

== Draw ==
=== Key ===
- Q = Qualifier
- WC = Wild card
- LL = Lucky loser
- Alt = Alternate
- ITF = ITF entry
- PR = Protected ranking
- SR = Special ranking
- SE = Special exempt
- JE = Junior exempt
- JR = Junior Accelerator Programme entrant
- CO = College Accelerator Programme entrant
- NG = Next Gen Accelerator Program entrant
- w/o = Walkover
- r = Retired
- d = Defaulted

=== Finals ===
Quarterfinals
14	(Spain) Garbiñe Muguruza	6	6
7	(Russia) Svetlana Kuznetsova	3	4
PR	(Slovakia) Magdaléna Rybáriková	6	6
24	(United States) CoCo Vandeweghe	3	3
10	(United States) Venus Williams	6	7
13	(Latvia) Jeļena Ostapenko	3	5
6	(United Kingdom) Johanna Konta	6^{2}	7^{7}	6
2	(Romania) Simona Halep	7^{7}	6^{5}	4

Semifinals
14	(Spain) Garbiñe Muguruza	6	6
PR	(Slovakia) Magdaléna Rybáriková	1	1
10	(United States) Venus Williams	6	6
6	(United Kingdom) Johanna Konta	4	2

Final
14	(Spain) Garbiñe Muguruza	7	6
10	(United States) Venus Williams	5	0

=== Top half ===
==== Section 1 ====
First round
1	(Germany) A Kerber	6	6
Q	(United States) I Falconi	4	4
(Belgium) K Flipkens	6	6
(Japan) M Doi	4	3
(United States) S Rogers	6	4	6
(United States) J Boserup	3	6	3
(France) O Dodin	2	2
32	(Czech Republic) L Šafářová	6	6
23	(Netherlands) K Bertens	6^{4}	5
(Romania) S Cîrstea	7^{7}	7
(Poland) M Linette	6	2	3
WC	(United States) B Mattek-Sands	1	6	6
(Belgium) Y Wickmayer	6	7
(Ukraine) K Bondarenko	2	5
(Russia) E Alexandrova	2	4
14	(Spain) G Muguruza	6	6

Second round
1	(Germany) A Kerber	7	7
(Belgium) K Flipkens	5	5
(United States) S Rogers	6^{4}	6	6
32	(Czech Republic) L Šafářová	7^{7}	4	3
(Romania) S Cîrstea	4	7^{7}	0
WC	(United States) B Mattek-Sands	6	6^{4}	0^{r}
(Belgium) Y Wickmayer	2	4
14	(Spain) G Muguruza	6	6

Third round
1	(Germany) A Kerber	4	7^{7}	6
(United States) S Rogers	6	6^{2}	4
(Romania) S Cîrstea	2	2
14	(Spain) G Muguruza	6	6

Fourth round
1	(Germany) A Kerber	6	4	4
14	(Spain) G Muguruza	4	6	6

==== Section 2 ====
First round
9	(Poland) A Radwańska	7^{7}	6
(Serbia) J Janković	6^{3}	0
WC	(United Kingdom) K Boulter	6	5	3
(United States) C McHale	3	7	6
(Slovakia) K Kučová	6	6
Q	(Canada) B Andreescu	4	3
(Puerto Rico) M Puig	1	6	0
19	(Switzerland) T Bacsinszky	6	3	6
28	(United States) L Davis	4	5
(United States) V Lepchenko	6	7
Q	(Slovenia) P Hercog	6	6
(Germany) A Beck	2	1
(Russia) E Makarova	6	6
Q	(Belgium) A Van Uytvanck	3	1
Q	(Tunisia) O Jabeur	3	2
7	(Russia) S Kuznetsova	6	6

Second round
9	(Poland) A Radwańska	5	7^{9}	6
(United States) C McHale	7	6^{7}	3
(Slovakia) K Kučová	1	0
19	(Switzerland) T Bacsinszky	6	6
(United States) V Lepchenko	7^{7}	2	2
Q	(Slovenia) P Hercog	6^{2}	6	6
(Russia) E Makarova	0	5
7	(Russia) S Kuznetsova	6	7

Third round
9	(Poland) A Radwańska	3	6	6
19	(Switzerland) T Bacsinszky	6	4	1
Q	(Slovenia) P Hercog	4	0
7	(Russia) S Kuznetsova	6	6

Fourth round
9	(Poland) A Radwańska	2	4
7	(Russia) S Kuznetsova	6	6

==== Section 3 ====
First round
3	(Czech Republic) Ka Plíšková	6	6
(Russia) E Rodina	1	4
(Romania) M Niculescu	4	1
PR	(Slovakia) M Rybáriková	6	6
(Ukraine) L Tsurenko	6^{5}	7^{10}	6
(Germany) J Görges	7^{7}	6^{8}	4
(Switzerland) V Golubic	6	6^{2}	6
30	(China) S Zhang	3	7^{7}	1
20	(Australia) D Gavrilova	4	6	8
Q	(Croatia) P Martić	6	2	10
(Czech Republic) D Allertová	7^{7}	2	6
(Japan) R Ozaki	6^{5}	6	3
(China) X Han	3	4
WC	(Kazakhstan) Z Diyas	6	6
Q	(Australia) Ar Rodionova	3	7^{8}	9
16	(Russia) A Pavlyuchenkova	6	6^{6}	7

Second round
3	(Czech Republic) Ka Plíšková	6	5	2
PR	(Slovakia) M Rybáriková	3	7	6
(Ukraine) L Tsurenko	6	2	6
(Switzerland) V Golubic	1	6	3
Q	(Croatia) P Martić	6	6
(Czech Republic) D Allertová	1	4
WC	(Kazakhstan) Z Diyas	6	7^{7}
Q	(Australia) Ar Rodionova	4	6^{4}

Third round
PR	(Slovakia) M Rybáriková	6	6
(Ukraine) L Tsurenko	2	1
Q	(Croatia) P Martić	7^{8}	6
WC	(Kazakhstan) Z Diyas	6^{6}	1

Fourth round
PR	(Slovakia) M Rybáriková	6	2	6
Q	(Croatia) P Martić	4	6	3

==== Section 4 ====
First round
12	(France) K Mladenovic	6	6
(France) P Parmentier	1	3
(United States) A Riske	6	7
PR	(United States) S Stephens	2	5
(Germany) T Maria	6	2
Q	(Russia) A Potapova	3	2^{r}
(Germany) M Barthel	5	2
24	(United States) C Vandeweghe	7	6
29	(Russia) D Kasatkina	6	6
(China) S Zheng	2	4
(Spain) L Arruabarrena	2	4
(Estonia) A Kontaveit	6	6
(Bulgaria) T Pironkova	6	6
(Italy) S Errani	1	4
(Hungary) T Babos	4	6	1
5	(Denmark) C Wozniacki	6	4	6

Second round
12	(France) K Mladenovic	6	4	4
(United States) A Riske	2	6	6
(Germany) T Maria	4	2
24	(United States) C Vandeweghe	6	6
29	(Russia) D Kasatkina	3	2
(Estonia) A Kontaveit	6	6
(Bulgaria) T Pironkova	3	4
5	(Denmark) C Wozniacki	6	6

Third round
(United States) A Riske	2	4
24	(United States) C Vandeweghe	6	6
(Estonia) A Kontaveit	6	6^{3}	2
5	(Denmark) C Wozniacki	3	7^{7}	6

Fourth round
24	(United States) C Vandeweghe	7^{7}	6
5	(Denmark) C Wozniacki	6^{4}	4

=== Bottom half ===
==== Section 5 ====
First round
8	(Slovakia) D Cibulková	6	3	9
(Germany) A Petkovic	3	6	7
(United States) J Brady	6	6
(Montenegro) D Kovinić	3	1
WC	(United Kingdom) N Broady	4	2
(Romania) I-C Begu	6	6
PR	(Germany) S Lisicki	1	4
27	(Croatia) A Konjuh	6	6
22	(Czech Republic) B Strýcová	6	6
(Paraguay) V Cepede Royg	3	3
(Spain) S Sorribes Tormo	3	6^{3}
(Japan) N Osaka	6	7^{7}
(Chinese Taipei) K-c Chang	3	4
(China) Q Wang	6	6
(Belgium) E Mertens	6^{7}	4
10	(United States) V Williams	7^{9}	6

Second round
8	(Slovakia) D Cibulková	6	6
(United States) J Brady	4	4
(Romania) I-C Begu	6^{3}	6	3
27	(Croatia) A Konjuh	7^{7}	2	6
22	(Czech Republic) B Strýcová	1	6	4
(Japan) N Osaka	6	0	6
(China) Q Wang	6	4	1
10	(United States) V Williams	4	6	6

Third round
8	(Slovakia) D Cibulková	6^{3}	6	4
27	(Croatia) A Konjuh	7^{7}	3	6
(Japan) N Osaka	6^{3}	4
10	(United States) V Williams	7^{7}	6

Fourth round
27	(Croatia) A Konjuh	3	2
10	(United States) V Williams	6	6

==== Section 6 ====
First round
13	(Latvia) J Ostapenko	6	1	6
(Belarus) A Sasnovich	0	6	3
Q	(Canada) F Abanda	6	6
(Japan) K Nara	2	4
(Italy) C Giorgi	5	6	6
(France) A Cornet	7	4	4
(Japan) N Hibino	4	2
17	(United States) M Keys	6	6
26	(Croatia) M Lučić-Baroni	3	7	6
(Germany) C Witthöft	6	5	8
Q	(Belarus) A Sabalenka	6	6
(Russia) I Khromacheva	3	4
(Italy) F Schiavone	6	6
(Luxembourg) M Minella	1	1
(Australia) A Barty	5	6^{8}
4	(Ukraine) E Svitolina	7	7^{10}

Second round
13	(Latvia) J Ostapenko	4	7^{7}	6
Q	(Canada) F Abanda	6	6^{4}	3
(Italy) C Giorgi	6	6^{10}	6
17	(United States) M Keys	4	7^{12}	1
(Germany) C Witthöft	7^{7}	3	6
Q	(Belarus) A Sabalenka	6^{5}	6	3
(Italy) F Schiavone	3	0
4	(Ukraine) E Svitolina	6	6

Third round
13	(Latvia) J Ostapenko	7	7
(Italy) C Giorgi	5	5
(Germany) C Witthöft	1	5
4	(Ukraine) E Svitolina	6	7

Fourth round
13	(Latvia) J Ostapenko	6	7^{8}
4	(Ukraine) E Svitolina	3	6^{6}

==== Section 7 ====
First round
6	(United Kingdom) J Konta	6	6
(Chinese Taipei) S-w Hsieh	2	2
(Croatia) D Vekić	6^{6}	6	6
(Russia) N Vikhlyantseva	7^{8}	4	1
(Czech Republic) K Siniaková	3	4
(Greece) M Sakkari	6	6
(Czech Republic) Kr Plíšková	7^{8}	6
31	(Italy) R Vinci	6^{6}	2
21	(France) C Garcia	6	6
(Slovakia) J Čepelová	1	1
(China) Y Duan	4	2
(Romania) A Bogdan	6	6
(United States) M Brengle	6	6
(Netherlands) R Hogenkamp	3	3
(Sweden) J Larsson	3	4
11	(Czech Republic) P Kvitová	6	6

Second round
6	(United Kingdom) J Konta	7^{7}	4	10
(Croatia) D Vekić	6^{4}	6	8
(Greece) M Sakkari	6^{6}	6	6
(Czech Republic) Kr Plíšková	7^{8}	4	4
21	(France) C Garcia	6	6
(Romania) A Bogdan	4	3
(United States) M Brengle	6	1	6
11	(Czech Republic) P Kvitová	3	6	2

Third round
6	(United Kingdom) J Konta	6	6
(Greece) M Sakkari	4	1
21	(France) C Garcia	6	6
(United States) M Brengle	4	3

Fourth round
6	(United Kingdom) J Konta	7^{7}	4	6
21	(France) C Garcia	6^{3}	6	4

==== Section 8 ====
First round
15	(Russia) E Vesnina	6	5	6
Q	(Russia) A Blinkova	4	7	2
PR	(Belarus) V Azarenka	3	6	6
(United States) C Bellis	6	2	1
(Belgium) M Zanevska	1	6^{5}
WC	(United Kingdom) H Watson	6	7^{7}
(Kazakhstan) Y Putintseva	1	6^{3}
18	(Latvia) A Sevastova	6	7^{7}
25	(Spain) C Suárez Navarro	1	6	6
(Canada) E Bouchard	6	1	1
(Czech Republic) M Vondroušová	7^{7}	0	4
(China) S Peng	6^{5}	6	6
(Brazil) B Haddad Maia	6	6
WC	(United Kingdom) L Robson	4	2
Q	(New Zealand) M Erakovic	4	1
2	(Romania) S Halep	6	6

Second round
15	(Russia) E Vesnina	3	3
PR	(Belarus) V Azarenka	6	6
WC	(United Kingdom) H Watson	6	6
18	(Latvia) A Sevastova	0	4
25	(Spain) C Suárez Navarro	2	2
(China) S Peng	6	6
(Brazil) B Haddad Maia	5	3
2	(Romania) S Halep	7	6

Third round
PR	(Belarus) V Azarenka	3	6	6
WC	(United Kingdom) H Watson	6	1	4
(China) S Peng	4	6^{7}
2	(Romania) S Halep	6	7^{9}

Fourth round
PR	(Belarus) V Azarenka	6^{3}	2
2	(Romania) S Halep	7^{7}	6

== Seeded players ==
Seeds are based on the WTA rankings as of 26 June 2017.

Rank and points before are as of 3 July 2017. Because the tournament takes place one week later than in 2016, points defending includes results from both the 2016 Wimbledon Championships and the tournaments from the week of 11 July 2016 (Bucharest and Gstaad).

Seed	Rank	Player	Points before	Points defending	Points won	Points after	Status
1	1	(Germany) Angelique Kerber	7,035	1,300	240	5,975	Fourth round lost to (Spain) Garbiñe Muguruza [14]
2	2	(Romania) Simona Halep	6,920	430+280	430+30	6,670	Quarterfinals lost to (United Kingdom) Johanna Konta [6]
3	3	(Czech Republic) Karolína Plíšková	6,855	70	70	6,855	Second round lost to (Slovakia) Magdaléna Rybáriková [PR]
4	5	(Ukraine) Elina Svitolina	4,765	70	240	4,935	Fourth round lost to (Latvia) Jeļena Ostapenko [13]
5	6	(Denmark) Caroline Wozniacki	4,550	10	240	4,780	Fourth round lost to (United States) Coco Vandeweghe [24]
6	7	(United Kingdom) Johanna Konta	4,400	70	780	5,110	Semifinals lost to (United States) Venus Williams [10]
7	8	(Russia) Svetlana Kuznetsova	4,310	240	430	4,500	Quarterfinals lost to (Spain) Garbiñe Muguruza [14]
8	9	(Slovakia) Dominika Cibulková	4,010	430	130	3,710	Third round lost to (Croatia) Ana Konjuh [27]
9	10	(Poland) Agnieszka Radwańska	3,985	240	240	3,985	Fourth round lost to (Russia) Svetlana Kuznetsova [7]
10	11	(United States) Venus Williams	3,941	780	1,300	4,461	Runner-up, lost to (Spain) Garbiñe Muguruza [14]
11	12	(Czech Republic) Petra Kvitová	3,135	70	70	3,135	Second round lost to (United States) Madison Brengle
12	14	(France) Kristina Mladenovic	3,095	10	70	3,155	Second round lost to (United States) Alison Riske
13	13	(Latvia) Jeļena Ostapenko	3,110	10	430	3,530	Quarterfinals lost to (United States) Venus Williams [10]
14	15	(Spain) Garbiñe Muguruza	3,060	70	2,000	4,990	Champion, defeated (United States) Venus Williams [10]
15	16	(Russia) Elena Vesnina	2,831	780	70	2,121	Second round lost to (Belarus) Victoria Azarenka [PR]
16	17	(Russia) Anastasia Pavlyuchenkova	2,580	430	10	2,160	First round lost to (Australia) Arina Rodionova [Q]
17	18	(United States) Madison Keys	2,523	240	70	2,353	Second round lost to (Italy) Camila Giorgi
18	19	(Latvia) Anastasija Sevastova	2,325	10+180	70+30	2,235	Second round lost to (United Kingdom) Heather Watson [WC]
19	20	(Switzerland) Timea Bacsinszky	1,873	130+110	130+1	1,764	Third round lost to (Poland) Agnieszka Radwańska [9]
20	21	(Australia) Daria Gavrilova	1,800	70	10	1,740	First round lost to (Croatia) Petra Martić [Q]
21	22	(France) Caroline Garcia	1,785	70	240	1,955	Fourth round lost to (United Kingdom) Johanna Konta [6]
22	23	(Czech Republic) Barbora Strýcová	1,785	130	70	1,725	Second round lost to (Japan) Naomi Osaka
23	24	(Netherlands) Kiki Bertens	1,685	130+180	10+1	1,386	First round lost to (Romania) Sorana Cîrstea
24	25	(United States) Coco Vandeweghe	1,658	240	430	1,848	Quarterfinals lost to (Slovakia) Magdaléna Rybáriková [PR]
25	27	(Spain) Carla Suárez Navarro	1,645	240	70	1,475	Second round lost to (China) Peng Shuai
26	28	(Croatia) Mirjana Lučić-Baroni	1,632	10	10	1,632	First round lost to (Germany) Carina Witthöft
27	29	(Croatia) Ana Konjuh	1,615	70	240	1,785	Fourth round lost to (United States) Venus Williams [10]
28	26	(United States) Lauren Davis	1,646	(55)	10	1,601	First round lost to (United States) Varvara Lepchenko
29	30	(Russia) Daria Kasatkina	1,580	130	70	1,520	Second round lost to (Estonia) Anett Kontaveit
30	31	(China) Zhang Shuai	1,550	10	10	1,550	First round lost to (Switzerland) Viktorija Golubic
31	33	(Italy) Roberta Vinci	1,495	130	10	1,375	First round lost to (Czech Republic) Kristýna Plíšková
32	34	(Czech Republic) Lucie Šafářová	1,450	240	70	1,280	Second round lost to (United States) Shelby Rogers

=== Withdrawals ===
The following players would have been seeded, but withdrew from the event.

Rank	Player	Points Before	Points defending	Points won	Points after	Withdrawal reason
4	(United States) Serena Williams	4,810	2,000	0	2,810	Pregnancy
32	(Germany) Laura Siegemund	1,500	10+110	0+1	1,381	Knee injury (cruciate ligament rupture)

== Other entry information ==
=== Wild cards ===
- (United Kingdom) Katie Boulter
- (United Kingdom) Naomi Broady
- (Kazakhstan) Zarina Diyas
- (United States) Bethanie Mattek-Sands
- (United Kingdom) Laura Robson
- (United Kingdom) Heather Watson

=== Protected ranking ===
- (Belarus) Victoria Azarenka (6)
- (United States) Sloane Stephens (26)
- (Germany) Sabine Lisicki (92)
- (Slovakia) Magdaléna Rybáriková (108)

=== Qualifiers ===
The qualifying competitions take place in Bank of England Sports Centre, Roehampton started from 26 June 2017 and to be scheduled to end on 29 June 2017. However, due to heavy rain on the second day, it has now extended to 30 June 2017.

- (Canada) Françoise Abanda
- (Canada) Bianca Andreescu
- (Russia) Anna Blinkova
- (New Zealand) Marina Erakovic
- (United States) Irina Falconi
- (Slovenia) Polona Hercog
- (Tunisia) Ons Jabeur
- (Croatia) Petra Martić
- (Russia) Anastasia Potapova
- (Australia) Arina Rodionova
- (Belarus) Aryna Sabalenka
- (Belgium) Alison Van Uytvanck

=== Withdrawals ===
- † (United States) Serena Williams (2) → replaced by (Netherlands) Richèl Hogenkamp (105)
- † (United States) Vania King (100) → replaced by (Romania) Ana Bogdan (106)
- ‡ (Germany) Laura Siegemund (32) → replaced by (Montenegro) Danka Kovinić (107)
- ‡ (Australia) Ajla Tomljanović (75 PR) → replaced by (Chinese Taipei) Chang Kai-chen (108)
- ‡ (Kazakhstan) Yaroslava Shvedova (51) → replaced by (Slovakia) Magdaléna Rybáriková (108 PR)
- ‡ (Australia) Samantha Stosur (24) → replaced by (Chinese Taipei) Hsieh Su-wei (109) (Note: The next two players, Han Xinyun (110) and Maryna Zanevska (111) were directly entered into the final spots after the last two wild card slots went unused. Zanevska was the last direct player to accept entry.)

† – not included on entry list
‡ – withdrew from entry list

=== Retirements ===
- (United States) Bethanie Mattek-Sands
- (Russia) Anastasia Potapova

== Championship match statistics ==
Category	(Spain) Muguruza	(United States) V. Williams
1st serve %	39/55 (71%)	44/62 (71%)
1st serve points won	30 of 39 = 77%	27 of 44 = 61%
2nd serve points won	8 of 16 = 50%	6 of 18 = 33%
Total service points won	38 of 55 = 69.09%	33 of 62 = 53.23%
Aces	1	3
Double faults	2	5
Winners	14	17
Unforced errors	11	25
Net points won	6 of 10 = 60%	6 of 13 = 46%
Break points converted	4 of 7 = 57%	0 of 3 = 0%
Return points won	29 of 62 = 47%	17 of 55 = 31%
Total points won	67	50

== Notes ==
Preceded by 2017 French Open – Women's singles	Grand Slam women's singles	Succeeded by 2017 US Open – Women's singles
