= 2023 Ladies Open Lausanne – Singles =

Singles
- 2023 Ladies Open Lausanne

Final
- Champion: (Italy) Elisabetta Cocciaretto
- Runner-up: (France) Clara Burel
- Score: 7–5, 4–6, 6–4

Details
- Draw: 32
- Seeds: 8

Events
Singles	Doubles
← 2022 ·	WTA Swiss Open	· 2024 →

Elisabetta Cocciaretto defeated Clara Burel in the final, 7–5, 4–6, 6–4 to win the singles tennis title at the 2023 Swiss Open. It was her first WTA Tour title. Cocciaretto saved multiple match points during the tournament—one match point against Céline Naef in the first round, and a further match point in the semifinals against Anna Bondár.

Petra Martić was the reigning champion, but chose not to defend her title.

== Seeds ==
1. (Romania) Irina-Camelia Begu (withdrew)
2. (Italy) Elisabetta Cocciaretto (champion)
3. (Romania) Ana Bogdan (quarterfinals, retired)
4. (Italy) Lucia Bronzetti (first round)
5. (United States) Emma Navarro (second round)
6. Mirra Andreeva (second round)
7. (France) Alizé Cornet (quarterfinals)
8. Elina Avanesyan (quarterfinals)
9. (France) Diane Parry (semifinals)

== Draw ==
=== Key ===
- Q = Qualifier
- WC = Wild card
- LL = Lucky loser
- Alt = Alternate
- SE = Special exempt
- PR = Protected ranking
- ITF = ITF entry
- JE = Junior exempt
- w/o = Walkover
- r = Retired
- d = Defaulted
- SR = Special ranking

=== Finals ===
Semifinals
9	(France) Diane Parry	6	6^{2}	3
(France) Clara Burel	4	7^{7}	6
(Hungary) Anna Bondár	7^{7}	6^{6}	5
2	(Italy) Elisabetta Cocciaretto	6^{3}	7^{8}	7

Final
(France) Clara Burel	5	6	4
2	(Italy) Elisabetta Cocciaretto	7	4	6

=== Top half ===
First round
9	(France) D Parry	7	2	6
WC	(France) F Ferro	5	6	2
LL	(Switzerland) J Dürst	0	2
(Montenegro) D Kovinić	6	6
(Switzerland) J Teichmann	6	6
E Andreeva	2	2
(Switzerland) V Golubic	6	1	3
7	(France) A Cornet	3	6	6
3	(Romania) A Bogdan	2	6	6
(Switzerland) S Waltert	6	3	3
Q	(Greece) V Grammatikopoulou	6^{11}	2
Q	(Slovenia) D Jakupović	7^{13}	6
(Serbia) O Danilović	4	4
(France) C Burel	6	6
(France) L Jeanjean	0	0
5	(United States) E Navarro	6	6

Second round
9	(France) D Parry	6	7
(Montenegro) D Kovinić	4	5
(Switzerland) J Teichmann	1	6	4
7	(France) A Cornet	6	1	6
3	(Romania) A Bogdan	6	5	6
Q	(Slovenia) D Jakupović	0	7	3
(France) C Burel	6	6
5	(United States) E Navarro	3	2

Quarterfinals
9	(France) D Parry	6	6
7	(France) A Cornet	3	2
3	(Romania) A Bogdan	3	0^{r}
(France) C Burel	6	1

Semifinals
9	(France) D Parry	6	6^{2}	3
(France) C Burel	4	7^{7}	6

=== Bottom half ===
First round
6	M Andreeva	6	6
Alt	(Ukraine) D Yastremska	0	2
(Spain) A Bolsova	1	3
(Hungary) A Bondár	6	6
(Spain) S Sorribes Tormo	6	6
WC	(Switzerland) S Bandecchi	2	1
(Slovenia) T Zidanšek	6	6
4	(Italy) L Bronzetti	2	4
8	E Avanesyan	6	2
PR	E Rodina	2	0^{r}
Q	(Hungary) RL Jani	5	2
Q	(France) C Paquet	7	6
(Argentina) J Riera	6	6
PR	(Romania) PM Țig	2	1
WC	(Switzerland) C Naef	6	6^{1}	2
2	(Italy) E Cocciaretto	3	7^{7}	6

Second round
6	M Andreeva	6^{3}	3
(Hungary) A Bondár	7^{7}	6
(Spain) S Sorribes Tormo	3	5
(Slovenia) T Zidanšek	6	7
8	E Avanesyan	2	7	6
Q	(France) C Paquet	6	5	1
(Argentina) J Riera	1	6	3
2	(Italy) E Cocciaretto	6	3	6

Quarterfinals
(Hungary) A Bondár	6	6
(Slovenia) T Zidanšek	2	0
8	E Avanesyan	5	3
2	(Italy) E Cocciaretto	7	6

Semifinals
(Hungary) A Bondár	7^{7}	6^{6}	5
2	(Italy) E Cocciaretto	6^{3}	7^{8}	7

== Qualifying ==
=== Seeds ===
1. (Ukraine) Dayana Yastremska (moved to main draw)
2. (Hungary) Réka Luca Jani (qualified)
3. (Greece) Valentini Grammatikopoulou (qualified)
4. (France) Chloé Paquet (qualified)

=== Qualifiers ===
1. (Slovenia) Dalila Jakupović
2. (Hungary) Réka Luca Jani
3. (Greece) Valentini Grammatikopoulou
4. (France) Chloé Paquet

=== Lucky loser ===
1. (Switzerland) Jenny Dürst

=== Qualifying draw ===
==== First qualifier ====
Qualifying competition
Alt	(Slovenia) Dalila Jakupović	6	7
WC	(Switzerland) Jenny Dürst	4	5

==== Second qualifier ====
Qualifying competition
2	(Hungary) Réka Luca Jani	6	6
PR	(France) Amandine Hesse	0	3

==== Third qualifier ====
Qualifying competition
3	(Greece) Valentini Grammatikopoulou	6	6
WC	(Switzerland) Valentina Ryser	1	3

==== Fourth qualifier ====
Qualifying competition
4	(France) Chloé Paquet	6	6
	(Canada) Carol Zhao	2	4
