= 2017 Ladies Championship Gstaad – Singles =

Singles
- 2017 Ladies Championship Gstaad

Final
- Champion: (Netherlands) Kiki Bertens
- Runner-up: (Estonia) Anett Kontaveit
- Score: 6–4, 3–6, 6–1

Events
| Singles | Doubles |
- Ladies Championship Gstaad

Viktorija Golubic was the defending champion, but lost in the first round to Antonia Lottner.

Kiki Bertens won the title, defeating Anett Kontaveit in the final, 6–4, 3–6, 6–1.

== Seeds ==
1. (France) Caroline Garcia (second round)
2. (Netherlands) Kiki Bertens (champion)
3. (Estonia) Anett Kontaveit (final)
4. (Germany) Mona Barthel (first round)
5. (Sweden) Johanna Larsson (quarterfinals)
6. (Germany) Carina Witthöft (quarterfinals)
7. (Switzerland) Viktorija Golubic (first round)
8. (Russia) Evgeniya Rodina (first round)

== Draw ==
Key

- Q = Qualifier
- WC = Wild card
- LL = Lucky loser
- Alt = Alternate
- ITF = ITF entry
- PR = Protected ranking
- SR = Special ranking
- SE = Special exempt
- JE = Junior exempt
- JR = Junior Accelerator Programme entrant
- CO = College Accelerator Programme entrant
- NG = Next Gen Accelerator Program entrant
- w/o = Walkover
- r = Retired
- d = Defaulted

=== Finals ===
Semifinals
(Czech Republic) Tereza Martincová | 4 | 1
3 | (Estonia) Anett Kontaveit | 6 | 6
(Spain) Sara Sorribes Tormo | 1 | 0^{r}
2 | (Netherlands) Kiki Bertens | 6 | 0

Final
3 | (Estonia) Anett Kontaveit | 4 | 6 | 1
2 | (Netherlands) Kiki Bertens | 6 | 3 | 6

=== Top half ===
First round
1 | (France) C Garcia | 7 | 6
(Bulgaria) E Kostova | 5 | 1
(Russia) I Khromacheva | 1 | 2
(Czech Republic) T Martincová | 6 | 6
WC | (Switzerland) A Sadiković | 4 | 7^{9} | 6^{6}
WC | (Switzerland) P Schnyder | 6 | 6^{7} | 7^{8}
Q | (Germany) A Lottner | 5 | 6 | 7^{7}
7 | (Switzerland) V Golubic | 7 | 4 | 6^{5}
3 | (Estonia) A Kontaveit | 6 | 6
Q | (Italy) M Trevisan | 1 | 3
Q | (Russia) A Kalinskaya | 7 | 6^{9} | 7
WC | (Switzerland) R Masarova | 5 | 7^{11} | 5
(Serbia) N Stojanović | 3 | 4
(Slovakia) R Šramková | 6 | 6
(Spain) S Soler Espinosa | 3 | 6^{5}
6 | (Germany) C Witthöft | 6 | 7^{7}

Second round
1 | (France) C Garcia | 5 | 6^{1}
(Czech Republic) T Martincová | 7 | 7^{7}
WC | (Switzerland) P Schnyder | 6^{0} | 6 | 3
Q | (Germany) A Lottner | 7^{7} | 2 | 6
3 | (Estonia) A Kontaveit | 6 | 4 | 6
Q | (Russia) A Kalinskaya | 4 | 6 | 4
(Slovakia) R Šramková | 6 | 2 | 2
6 | (Germany) C Witthöft | 2 | 6 | 6

Quarterfinals
(Czech Republic) T Martincová | 3 | 6 | 7
Q | (Germany) A Lottner | 6 | 1 | 5
3 | (Estonia) A Kontaveit | 6 | 6
6 | (Germany) C Witthöft | 2 | 4

Semifinals
(Czech Republic) T Martincová | 4 | 1
3 | (Estonia) A Kontaveit | 6 | 6

=== Bottom half ===
First round
8 | (Russia) E Rodina | 6 | 3 | 6^{5}
(Spain) S Sorribes Tormo | 4 | 6 | 7^{7}
(United States) L Chirico | 7^{7} | 6
Q | (Czech Republic) T Smitková | 6^{5} | 4
(Germany) T Korpatsch | 6 | 6
(Switzerland) J Teichmann | 3 | 0
(Greece) M Sakkari | 4 | 6 | 6
4 | (Germany) M Barthel | 6 | 3 | 3
5 | (Sweden) J Larsson | 7 | 6
(Bulgaria) V Tomova | 5 | 4
Q | (Turkey) B Eraydın | 4 | 6 | 6^{3}
(Austria) B Haas | 6 | 4 | 7^{7}
Q | (Germany) A Zaja | 6 | 6
(Romania) PM Țig | 2 | 3
(Serbia) A Krunić | 3 | 1
2 | (Netherlands) K Bertens | 6 | 6

Second round
(Spain) S Sorribes Tormo | 6 | 7
(United States) L Chirico | 1 | 5
(Germany) T Korpatsch | 5 | 6 | 6
(Greece) M Sakkari | 7 | 3 | 0
5 | (Sweden) J Larsson | 1 | 7 | 6
(Austria) B Haas | 6 | 5 | 1
Q | (Germany) A Zaja | 4 | 2
2 | (Netherlands) K Bertens | 6 | 6

Quarterfinals
(Spain) S Sorribes Tormo | 6 | 6
(Germany) T Korpatsch | 2 | 3
5 | (Sweden) J Larsson | 4 | 4
2 | (Netherlands) K Bertens | 6 | 6

Semifinals
(Spain) S Sorribes Tormo | 1 | 0^{r}
2 | (Netherlands) K Bertens | 6 | 0

== Qualifying ==
=== Seeds ===
1. (Germany) Antonia Lottner (qualified)
2. (Russia) Anna Kalinskaya (qualified)
3. (Czech Republic) Tereza Smitková (qualified)
4. (Italy) Martina Trevisan (qualified)
5. (Liechtenstein) Kathinka von Deichmann (first round)
6. (Turkey) Başak Eraydın (qualified)
7. (Greece) Valentini Grammatikopoulou (qualifying competition)
8. (France) Chloé Paquet (first round)
9. (Switzerland) Conny Perrin (qualifying competition)
10. (United States) Jacqueline Cako (first round)
11. (Israel) Deniz Khazaniuk (first round)
12. (Spain) Olga Sáez Larra (qualifying competition)

=== Qualifiers ===
1. (Germany) Antonia Lottner
2. (Russia) Anna Kalinskaya
3. (Czech Republic) Tereza Smitková
4. (Italy) Martina Trevisan
5. (Germany) Anna Zaja
6. (Turkey) Başak Eraydın

=== Draw ===
==== First qualifier ====
First round
1 | (Germany) Antonia Lottner | 6 | 6
(Russia) Anastasia Potapova | 4 | 2
WC | (Switzerland) Xenia Knoll | 0 | 6 | 6
8 | (France) Chloé Paquet | 6 | 3 | 3

Qualifying competition
1 | (Germany) Antonia Lottner | 7^{7} | 6
WC | (Switzerland) Xenia Knoll | 6^{5} | 2

==== Second qualifier ====
First round
2 | (Russia) Anna Kalinskaya | 3 | 6 | 6
(Italy) Camilla Rosatello | 6 | 3 | 1
(Switzerland) Chiara Grimm | 7^{11} | 4 | 3
9 | (Switzerland) Conny Perrin | 6^{9} | 6 | 6

Qualifying competition
2 | (Russia) Anna Kalinskaya | 6 | 7
9 | (Switzerland) Conny Perrin | 1 | 5

==== Third qualifier ====
First round
3 | (Czech Republic) Tereza Smitková | 6 | 6
(Austria) Julia Grabher | 2 | 1
(Sweden) Cornelia Lister | 3 | 3
7 | (Greece) Valentini Grammatikopoulou | 6 | 6

Qualifying competition
3 | (Czech Republic) Tereza Smitková | 6^{5} | 7 | 6
7 | (Greece) Valentini Grammatikopoulou | 7^{7} | 5 | 1

==== Fourth qualifier ====
First round
4 | (Italy) Martina Trevisan | 5 | 7^{7} | 6
(Latvia) Diāna Marcinkēviča | 7 | 6^{4} | 4
(Venezuela) Andrea Gámiz | 6 | 6
11 | (Israel) Deniz Khazaniuk | 3 | 3

Qualifying competition
4 | (Italy) Martina Trevisan | 6 | 6
(Venezuela) Andrea Gámiz | 2 | 2

==== Fifth qualifier ====
First round
5 | (Liechtenstein) Kathinka von Deichmann | 7 | 0 | 2
(Germany) Anna Zaja | 5 | 6 | 6
(Switzerland) Tess Sugnaux | 0 | 4
12 | (Spain) Olga Sáez Larra | 6 | 6

Qualifying competition
(Germany) Anna Zaja | 6 | 2 | 6
12 | (Spain) Olga Sáez Larra | 4 | 6 | 1

==== Sixth qualifier ====
First round
6 | (Turkey) Başak Eraydın | 6 | 6
WC | (Switzerland) Ylena In-Albon | 4 | 3
(Bulgaria) Aleksandrina Naydenova | 6 | 4 | 6
10 | (United States) Jacqueline Cako | 4 | 6 | 3

Qualifying competition
6 | (Turkey) Başak Eraydın | 7^{7} | 6
(Bulgaria) Aleksandrina Naydenova | 6^{4} | 1
