= 2017 Ladies Championship Gstaad – Doubles =

Doubles
- 2017 Ladies Championship Gstaad

Final
- Champions: (Netherlands) Kiki Bertens (Sweden) Johanna Larsson
- Runners-up: (Switzerland) Viktorija Golubic (Serbia) Nina Stojanović
- Score: 7–6^{(7–4)}, 4–6, [10–7]

Events
Singles	Doubles
- Ladies Championship Gstaad

Lara Arruabarrena and Xenia Knoll were the defending champions, but Arruabarrena chose not to participate this year. Knoll played alongside Anastasiya Komardina, but lost in the quarterfinals to Anna Kalinskaya and Evgeniya Rodina.

Kiki Bertens and Johanna Larsson won the title, defeating Viktorija Golubic and Nina Stojanović in the final, 7–6^{(7–4)}, 4–6, [10–7].

== Seeds ==
1. (Netherlands) Kiki Bertens / (Sweden) Johanna Larsson (champions)
2. (United States) Nicole Melichar / (United Kingdom) Anna Smith (first round)
3. (Switzerland) Viktorija Golubic / (Serbia) Nina Stojanović (final)
4. (Russia) Irina Khromacheva / (Serbia) Aleksandra Krunić (first round)

== Draw ==
Key

- Q = Qualifier
- WC = Wild card
- LL = Lucky loser
- Alt = Alternate
- ITF = ITF entry
- PR = Protected ranking
- SR = Special ranking
- SE = Special exempt
- JE = Junior exempt
- JR = Junior Accelerator Programme entrant
- CO = College Accelerator Programme entrant
- NG = Next Gen Accelerator Program entrant
- w/o = Walkover
- r = Retired
- d = Defaulted

=== Draw ===
First round
1	(Netherlands) K Bertens (Sweden) J Larsson	6	6
(Latvia) D Marcinkēviča (Italy) C Rosatello	3	1
(Germany) T Korpatsch (Belarus) I Kremen	1	5
(Czech Republic) L Kunčíková (Netherlands) E Wacanno	6	7
4	(Russia) I Khromacheva (Serbia) A Krunić	5	6^{3}
(Sweden) C Lister (Bulgaria) A Naydenova	7	7^{7}
(Spain) S Soler Espinosa (Spain) S Sorribes Tormo	6	7
(Germany) N Geuer (Germany) A Zaja	3	5
WC	(Switzerland) Y In-Albon (Switzerland) C Perrin	1	2
WC	(Switzerland) A Sadiković (Switzerland) J Teichmann	6	6
(United States) J Cako (Greece) V Grammatikopoulou	4	2
3	(Switzerland) V Golubic (Serbia) N Stojanović	6	6
(Russia) A Kalinskaya (Russia) E Rodina	6	6
(Venezuela) A Gámiz (Romania) PM Țig	4	4
(Switzerland) X Knoll (Russia) A Komardina	6	4	[10]
2	(United States) N Melichar (United Kingdom) A Smith	3	6	[5]

Quarterfinals
1	(Netherlands) K Bertens (Sweden) J Larsson	6	6
(Czech Republic) L Kunčíková (Netherlands) E Wacanno	4	3
(Sweden) C Lister (Bulgaria) A Naydenova	3	6	[10]
(Spain) S Soler Espinosa (Spain) S Sorribes Tormo	6	1	[8]
WC	(Switzerland) A Sadiković (Switzerland) J Teichmann	3	6	[9]
3	(Switzerland) V Golubic (Serbia) N Stojanović	6	2	[11]
(Russia) A Kalinskaya (Russia) E Rodina	6	6
(Switzerland) X Knoll (Russia) A Komardina	2	3

Semifinals
1	(Netherlands) K Bertens (Sweden) J Larsson	6	6
(Sweden) C Lister (Bulgaria) A Naydenova	2	3
3	(Switzerland) V Golubic (Serbia) N Stojanović	6	6
(Russia) A Kalinskaya (Russia) E Rodina	1	3

Final
1	(Netherlands) K Bertens (Sweden) J Larsson	7^{7}	4	[10]
3	(Switzerland) V Golubic (Serbia) N Stojanović	6^{4}	6	[7]
