= 1992 Lucerne Ladies European Open =

- Date: 18–24 May
- Edition: 16th
- Category: Tier IV
- Draw: 28S / 16D
- Prize money: $150,000
- Surface: Clay / outdoor
- Location: Lucerne, Switzerland
- Venue: Tennis Club Lido

Champions

Singles
- (United States) Amy Frazier

Doubles
- (United States) Amy Frazier / (South Africa) Elna Reinach
- WTA Swiss Open

The 1992 Lucerne Ladies European Open was a women's tennis tournament played on outdoor clay courts at the Tennis Club Lido in Lucerne, Switzerland that was part of the Tier IV category of the 1992 WTA Tour. It was the 16th edition of the tournament and was held from 18 May until 24 May 1992. Second-seeded Amy Frazier won the singles title and earned $27,000 first-prize money.

== Finals ==
=== Singles ===
(United States) Amy Frazier defeated (Czechoslovakia) Radka Zrubáková 6–4, 4–6, 7–5

- It was Frazier's 1st singles title of the year and the 3rd of her career.

=== Doubles ===
(United States) Amy Frazier / (South Africa) Elna Reinach defeated (Czechoslovakia) Karina Habšudová / (United States) Marianne Werdel 7–5, 6–2
