= 2022 Ladies Open Lausanne – Doubles =

Doubles
- 2022 Ladies Open Lausanne

Final
- Champions: (Serbia) Olga Danilović (France) Kristina Mladenovic
- Runners-up: (Norway) Ulrikke Eikeri (Slovenia) Tamara Zidanšek
- Score: Walkover

Events
Singles	Doubles
← 2021 ·	WTA Swiss Open	· 2023 →

Olga Danilović and Kristina Mladenovic won the doubles tennis title at the 2022 Ladies Open Lausanne after Ulrikke Eikeri and Tamara Zidanšek withdrew from the final.

Susan Bandecchi and Simona Waltert were the defending champions, but were defeated in the first round by Alicia Barnett and Olivia Nicholls.

== Seeds ==
1. (Chile) Alexa Guarachi / (United States) Asia Muhammad (first round)
2. (Norway) Ulrikke Eikeri / (Slovenia) Tamara Zidanšek (final, withdrew)
3. Anna Kalinskaya / (Romania) Raluca Olaru (quarterfinals, withdrew)
4. (Chinese Taipei) Chan Hao-ching / (Chinese Taipei) Latisha Chan (quarterfinals)

== Draw ==
=== Key ===
- Q = Qualifier
- WC = Wild card
- LL = Lucky loser
- Alt = Alternate
- SE = Special exempt
- PR = Protected ranking
- ITF = ITF entry
- JE = Junior exempt
- w/o = Walkover
- r = Retired
- d = Defaulted
- SR = Special ranking

=== Draw ===
First round
1	(Chile) A Guarachi (United States) A Muhammad	6	3	[7]
(China) X Han; A Panova	3	6	[10]
(United Kingdom) A Barnett (United Kingdom) O Nicholls	6	7
WC	(Switzerland) S Bandecchi (Switzerland) S Waltert	3	5
3	A Kalinskaya (Romania) R Olaru	7^{9}	7
A Potapova; Y Sizikova	6^{7}	5
(Serbia) O Danilović (France) K Mladenovic	3	6	[11]
(Germany) V Heisen (United Kingdom) S Murray Sharan	6	3	[9]
(Japan) M Kato (Indonesia) A Sutjiadi	6	6
(Netherlands) A Hartono (Netherlands) R van der Hoek	1	3
A Fomina-Klotz; E Yashina	5	1
4	(Chinese Taipei) H-c Chan (Chinese Taipei) L Chan	7	6
A Blinkova; V Gracheva	6	6
(Spain) N Párrizas Díaz; O Selekhmeteva	2	3
WC	(Switzerland) Y In-Albon (Switzerland) X Knoll	0	3
2	(Norway) U Eikeri (Slovenia) T Zidanšek	6	6

Quarterfinals
(China) X Han; A Panova	7	6^{5}	[10]
(United Kingdom) A Barnett (United Kingdom) O Nicholls	5	7^{7}	[7]
3	A Kalinskaya (Romania) R Olaru
(Serbia) O Danilović (France) K Mladenovic	w/o
(Japan) M Kato (Indonesia) A Sutjiadi	6^{5}	6	[11]
4	(Chinese Taipei) H-c Chan (Chinese Taipei) L Chan	7^{7}	1	[9]
A Blinkova; V Gracheva	3	6^{3}
2	(Norway) U Eikeri (Slovenia) T Zidanšek	6	7^{7}

Semifinals
(China) X Han; A Panova	1	2
(Serbia) O Danilović (France) K Mladenovic	6	6
(Japan) M Kato (Indonesia) A Sutjiadi	4	4
2	(Norway) U Eikeri (Slovenia) T Zidanšek	6	6

Final
(Serbia) O Danilović (France) K Mladenovic	w/o
2	(Norway) U Eikeri (Slovenia) T Zidanšek
