= 2022 Ladies Open Lausanne – Singles =

Singles
- 2022 Ladies Open Lausanne

Final
- Champion: (Croatia) Petra Martić
- Runner-up: (Serbia) Olga Danilović
- Score: 6–4, 6–2

Details
- Draw: 32
- Seeds: 8

Events
Singles	Doubles
← 2021 ·	WTA Swiss Open	· 2023 →

Petra Martić defeated Olga Danilović in the final, 6–4, 6–2 to win the singles tennis title at the 2022 Ladies Open Lausanne. It was Martić's first WTA title since Istanbul in 2019.

Tamara Zidanšek was the defending champion, but was defeated in the first round by Anna Kalinskaya.

== Seeds ==
1. (United States) Danielle Collins (first round)
2. (Switzerland) Belinda Bencic (quarterfinals)
3. (Romania) Irina-Camelia Begu (second round)
4. (Spain) Sara Sorribes Tormo (quarterfinals)
5. (Spain) Nuria Párrizas Díaz (first round)
6. (France) Caroline Garcia (semifinals)
7. (Slovenia) Tamara Zidanšek (first round)
8. Varvara Gracheva (first round)

== Draw ==
=== Key ===
- Q = Qualifier
- WC = Wild card
- LL = Lucky loser
- Alt = Alternate
- SE = Special exempt
- PR = Protected ranking
- ITF = ITF entry
- JE = Junior exempt
- w/o = Walkover
- r = Retired
- d = Defaulted
- SR = Special ranking

=== Finals ===
Semifinals
Q	(Serbia) Olga Danilović	6	6
Anastasia Potapova	3	2
6	(France) Caroline Garcia	4	6	3
(Croatia) Petra Martić	6	1	6

Final
Q	(Serbia) Olga Danilović	4	2
(Croatia) Petra Martić	6	6

=== Top half ===
First round
1	(United States) D Collins	7^{7}	3	6^{6}
WC	(Switzerland) S Waltert	6^{5}	6	7^{8}
WC	(France) K Mladenovic	4	6^{3}
Q	(Spain) C Bucșa	6	7^{7}
Q	(Serbia) O Danilović	6	6
(Japan) M Doi	3	3
A Kalinskaya	7^{7}	3	6
7	(Slovenia) T Zidanšek	6^{2}	6	3
3	(Romania) I-C Begu	6	6
(Germany) T Korpatsch	4	2
(Italy) L Bronzetti	2	6	4
A Potapova	6	3	6
(Switzerland) Y In-Albon	5	7^{7}	3
(Germany) J Niemeier	7	6^{3}	6
Q	(Germany) E Lys	7	6
8	V Gracheva	5	4

Second round
WC	(Switzerland) S Waltert	6	5	6
Q	(Spain) C Bucșa	1	7	4
Q	(Serbia) O Danilović	6	3	7
A Kalinskaya	3	6	5
3	(Romania) I-C Begu	4	2
A Potapova	6	6
(Germany) J Niemeier	6	6
Q	(Germany) E Lys	4	2

Quarterfinals
WC	(Switzerland) S Waltert	4	6	6^{5}
Q	(Serbia) O Danilović	6	4	7^{7}
A Potapova	6	6
(Germany) J Niemeier	4	2

Semifinals
Q	(Serbia) O Danilović	6	6
A Potapova	3	2

=== Bottom half ===
First round
6	(France) C Garcia	6	6
(Italy) J Paolini	3	3
Q	(France) L Jeanjean	w/o
PR	(Germany) T Maria
(China) L Zhu	0	1
(France) C Burel	6	6
(United States) L Davis	2	6^{1}
4	(Spain) S Sorribes Tormo	6	7^{7}
5	(Spain) N Párrizas Díaz	2	2
(Croatia) P Martić	6	6
Q	A Blinkova	1	2
Q	E Andreeva	6	6
(France) O Dodin	2	1
WC	(Switzerland) S Bandecchi	6	6
(France) D Parry	6	3	1
2	(Switzerland) B Bencic	3	6	6

Second round
6	(France) C Garcia	6	6
Q	(France) L Jeanjean	1	4
(France) C Burel	4	2
4	(Spain) S Sorribes Tormo	6	6
(Croatia) P Martić	6	6
Q	E Andreeva	4	2
WC	(Switzerland) S Bandecchi	3	4
2	(Switzerland) B Bencic	6	6

Quarterfinals
6	(France) C Garcia	6	6
4	(Spain) S Sorribes Tormo	4	1
(Croatia) P Martić	6	7^{7}
2	(Switzerland) B Bencic	3	6^{2}

Semifinals
6	(France) C Garcia	4	6	3
(Croatia) P Martić	6	1	6

== Qualifying ==
=== Seeds ===
1. (United States) Katie Volynets (qualifying competition)
2. (Serbia) Olga Danilović (qualified)
3. Anna Blinkova (qualified)
4. (Spain) Cristina Bucșa (qualified)
5. (France) Léolia Jeanjean (qualified)
6. (Belgium) Ysaline Bonaventure (withdrew)
7. Anastasia Zakharova (qualifying competition)
8. Erika Andreeva (qualified)
9. (United States) Asia Muhammad (first round)
10. (Turkey) İpek Öz (qualifying competition)
11. (France) Elsa Jacquemot (first round)
12. (Romania) Alexandra Cadanțu-Ignatik (qualifying competition)

=== Qualifiers ===
1. (Germany) Eva Lys
2. (Serbia) Olga Danilović
3. Anna Blinkova
4. (Spain) Cristina Bucșa
5. (France) Léolia Jeanjean
6. Erika Andreeva

=== Qualifying draw ===
==== First qualifier ====
First round
1	(United States) Katie Volynets	6	6
WC	(Switzerland) Sandy Marti	1	1
(Germany) Eva Lys	6	6
11	(France) Elsa Jacquemot	3	2

Qualifying competition
1	(United States) Katie Volynets	1	6	2
(Germany) Eva Lys	6	3	6

==== Second qualifier ====
First round
2	(Serbia) Olga Danilović	6	6
(Switzerland) Joanne Züger	1	4
(United States) Francesca Di Lorenzo	2	7	3
7	Anastasia Zakharova	6	5	6

Qualifying competition
2	(Serbia) Olga Danilović	6	6
7	Anastasia Zakharova	4	1

==== Third qualifier ====
First round
3	Anna Blinkova	2	6	6
(Italy) Giulia Gatto-Monticone	6	2	4
Natalia Vikhlyantseva	4	4
10	(Turkey) İpek Öz	6	6

Qualifying competition
3	Anna Blinkova	7	7^{7}
10	(Turkey) İpek Öz	5	6^{1}

==== Fourth qualifier ====
First round
4	(Spain) Cristina Bucșa	4	6	6
(Switzerland) Conny Perrin	6	0	3
Oksana Selekhmeteva	6^{5}	3
12	(Romania) Alexandra Cadanțu-Ignatik	7^{7}	6

Qualifying competition
4	(Spain) Cristina Bucșa	1	6	6
12	(Romania) Alexandra Cadanțu-Ignatik	6	3	2

==== Fifth qualifier ====
First round
5	(France) Léolia Jeanjean	6	6
(Germany) Lena Papadakis	3	3
(Japan) Yuki Naito	7^{7}	7
9	(United States) Asia Muhammad	6^{4}	5

Qualifying competition
5	(France) Léolia Jeanjean	6	7
(Japan) Yuki Naito	0	5

==== Sixth qualifier ====
First round
Alt	(Germany) Yana Morderger	2	6	4
(Belgium) Magali Kempen	6	1	6
Ekaterina Makarova	3	3
8	Erika Andreeva	6	6

Qualifying competition
(Belgium) Magali Kempen	1	2
8	Erika Andreeva	6	6
