= 2023 Ladies Open Lausanne – Doubles =

Doubles
- 2023 Ladies Open Lausanne

Final
- Champions: (Hungary) Anna Bondár (France) Diane Parry
- Runners-up: Amina Anshba (Czech Republic) Anastasia Dețiuc
- Score: 6–2, 6–1

Events
Singles	Doubles
← 2022 ·	WTA Swiss Open	· 2024 →

Anna Bondár and Diane Parry defeated Amina Anshba and Anastasia Dețiuc in the final, 6–2, 6–1 to win the doubles title at the 2023 Ladies Open Lausanne.

Olga Danilović and Kristina Mladenovic were the reigning champions, but chose not to defend their title.

== Seeds ==
1. Yana Sizikova / (Belgium) Kimberley Zimmermann (first round)
2. (Japan) Eri Hozumi / Irina Khromacheva (quarterfinals)
3. (Hungary) Anna Bondár / (France) Diane Parry (champions)
4. (Spain) Aliona Bolsova / (Venezuela) Andrea Gámiz (first round)

== Draw ==
=== Key ===
- Q = Qualifier
- WC = Wild card
- LL = Lucky loser
- Alt = Alternate
- SE = Special exempt
- PR = Protected ranking
- ITF = ITF entry
- JE = Junior exempt
- w/o = Walkover
- r = Retired
- d = Defaulted
- SR = Special ranking

=== Draw ===
First round
1	Y Sizikova (Belgium) K Zimmermann	3	3
A Anshba (Czech Republic) A Dețiuc	6	6
(Netherlands) J Gimbrère (Greece) V Grammatikopoulou	7	7
(Netherlands) B Schoofs (Netherlands) E Vedder	5	5
4	(Spain) A Bolsova (Venezuela) A Gámiz	6	2	[7]
(United States) Q Gleason (France) E Lechemia	4	6	[10]
(Switzerland) S Bandecchi (Switzerland) J Dürst	3	0
(Switzerland) V Golubic (Switzerland) S Waltert	6	6
(United Kingdom) F Christie (United Kingdom) A Collins	6	6
E Andreeva; M Andreeva	1	4
(United States) A Rogers (India) P Thombare	6^{3}	0
3	(Hungary) A Bondár (France) D Parry	7^{7}	6
(Slovenia) D Jakupović (Montenegro) D Kovinić	3
A Gabueva; E Yashina	1^{r}
(Argentina) J Riera (Australia) O Tjandramulia	0	2
2	(Japan) E Hozumi; I Khromacheva	6	6

Quarterfinals
A Anshba (Czech Republic) A Dețiuc	2	6	[11]
(Netherlands) J Gimbrère (Greece) V Grammatikopoulou	6	3	[9]
(United States) Q Gleason (France) E Lechemia	6	6^{3}	[10]
(Switzerland) V Golubic (Switzerland) S Waltert	4	7^{7}	[6]
(United Kingdom) F Christie (United Kingdom) A Collins	3	6^{4}
3	(Hungary) A Bondár (France) D Parry	6	7^{7}
(Slovenia) D Jakupović (Montenegro) D Kovinić	7^{7}	6
2	(Japan) E Hozumi; I Khromacheva	6^{4}	3

Semifinals
A Anshba (Czech Republic) A Dețiuc	7^{7}	6
(United States) Q Gleason (France) E Lechemia	6^{2}	4
3	(Hungary) A Bondár (France) D Parry	7	6^{2}	[10]
(Slovenia) D Jakupović (Montenegro) D Kovinić	5	7^{7}	[8]

Final
A Anshba (Czech Republic) A Dețiuc	2	1
3	(Hungary) A Bondár (France) D Parry	6	6
