= Roy Emerson Arena =

Tennis stadium located in Gstaad

Coordinates: 46.476128°N 7.284858°E

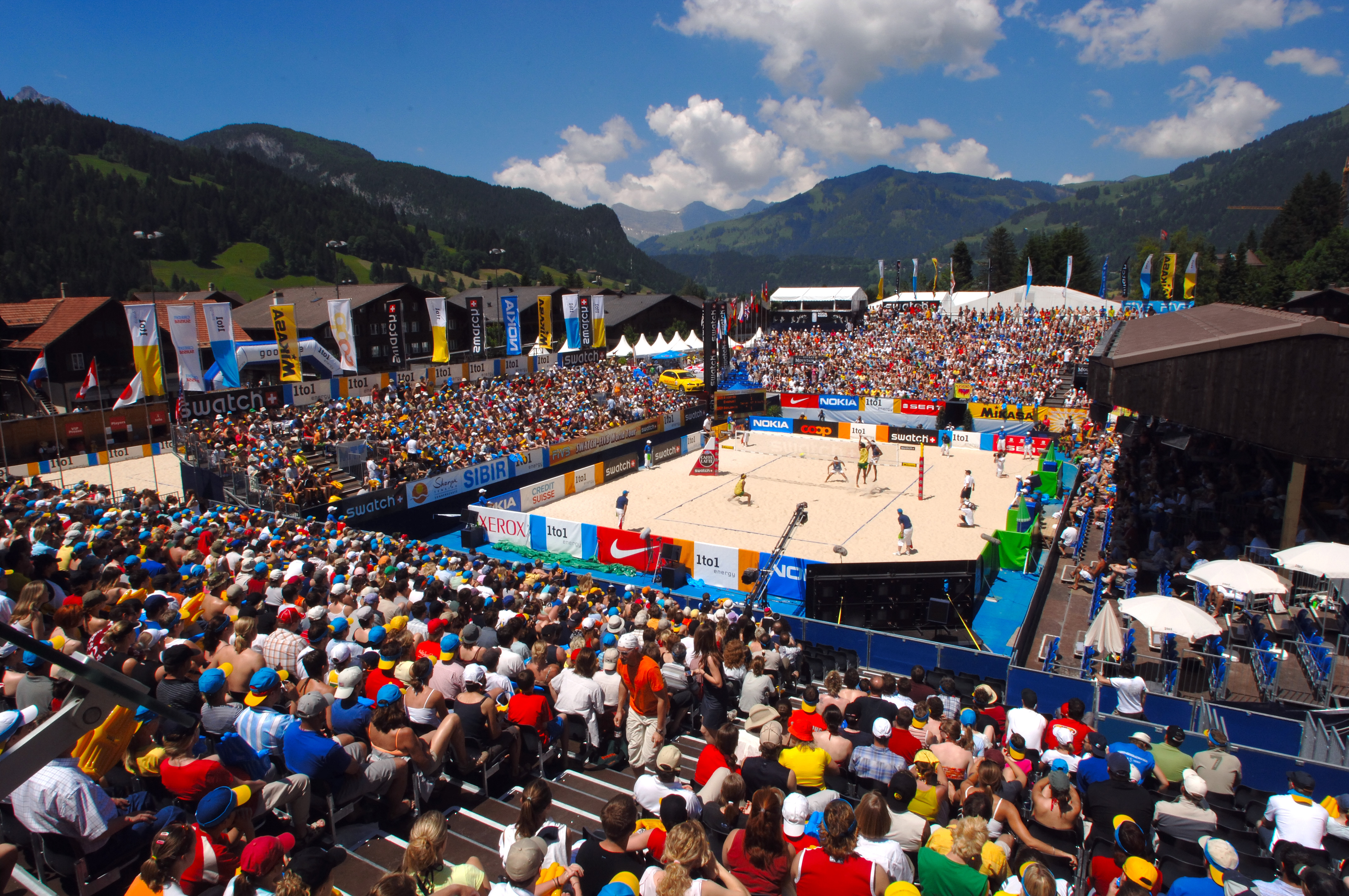
- Interactive map of Roy Emerson Arena
- Location: Gstaad; Switzerland
- Owner: Municipality of Gstaad
- Capacity: 4,500 (tennis)
- Surface: Clay

Construction
- Built: 1990
- Opened: 1991

Tenants
- Swiss Open (men's) (Tennis) (1991-present)

Roy Emerson Arena is a tennis stadium located in Gstaad, Switzerland. The stadium is the centerpiece of the Suisse Open Gstaad, an ATP Tour event. The stadium has a capacity of 4,500 spectators. It is named in honor of Roy Emerson, 12-time Grand Slam champion, and five-time winner of the Gstaad tournament.

== See also ==
- List of tennis stadiums by capacity
