= Evgeniya Rodina =

Russian tennis player

Evgeniya Rodina Евгения Родина
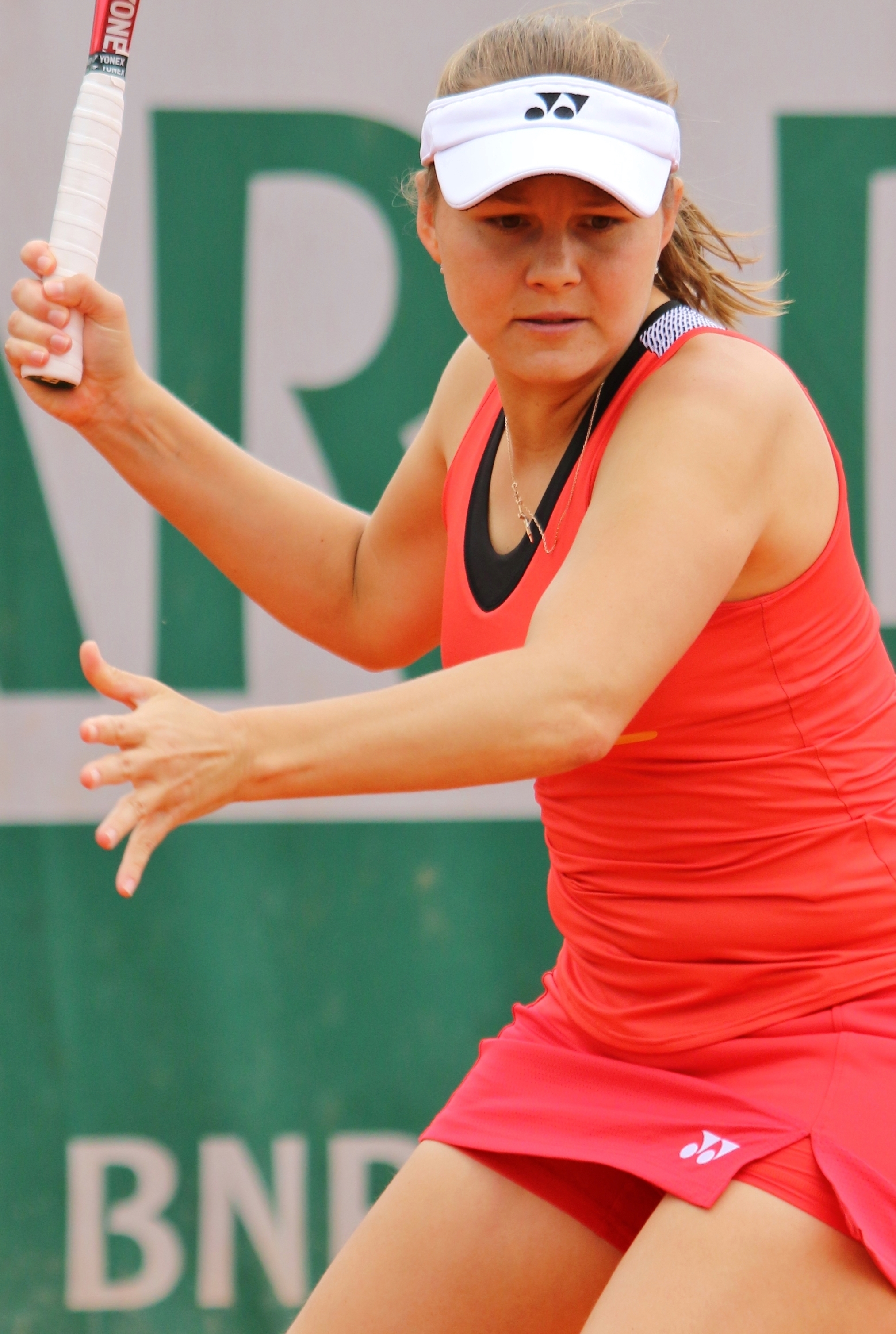
- Rodina at the 2019 French Open
- Country (sports): Russia
- Residence: Moscow
- Born: 4 February 1989 (age 37) Moscow, Russian SFSR, Soviet Union
- Height: 1.70 m (5 ft 7 in)
- Turned pro: 2004
- Plays: Right-handed (two-handed backhand)
- Prize money: US$ 2,587,974

Singles
- Career record: 448–352
- Career titles: 1 WTA 125, 13 ITF
- Highest ranking: No. 67 (6 May 2019)

Grand Slam singles results
- Australian Open: 2R (2011)
- French Open: 1R (2008, 2011, 2015, 2017, 2019)
- Wimbledon: 4R (2018)
- US Open: 2R (2015, 2016, 2017, 2022)

Doubles
- Career record: 159–142
- Career titles: 1 WTA 125, 6 ITF
- Highest ranking: No. 99 (24 October 2011)

Grand Slam doubles results
- French Open: 1R (2017)
- Wimbledon: 2R (2011)
- US Open: 2R (2008)

Evgeniya Sergeyevna Rodina (Евгения Сергеевна Родина; born 4 February 1989) is a Russian former professional tennis player. On 6 May 2019, she achieved a career-high singles ranking of world No. 67.

Rodina won 13 singles and six doubles titles on the ITF Women's Circuit along with one singles and one doubles title on WTA 125 tournaments.

== Personal life ==
Rodina is married to her coach Denis Shteyngart. They have a daughter, born in November 2012.

== Career ==
=== 2004–05 ===
Rodina began her career on the ITF Circuit with the assistance of a wildcard into the first round of the main draw of a $25k tournament at Moscow in late August 2004, when she was fifteen and a half years old, and took a set from up-and-coming fellow Russian Elena Vesnina, though she lost the match in three.

Further wildcards into two successive $10k events at Dubrovnik, Croatia that October gave her the opportunity to win her first and second main-draw ITF matches without qualifying. She lost in the second round on both occasions. But these two results were sufficient to put her onto the tail end of the rankings board at world No. 1138, by the end of the year.

After taking a six-month break from competition, she was granted a further wildcard directly into the main draw of a $10k event at Cavtat, Croatia in late April 2005, after her 16th birthday, and this time won two rounds before losing in the quarterfinals. At the end of that same week, she at last entered a $10k qualifying draw on the merit of her ranking alone, and qualified and then won four rounds of the main draw without dropping a set, only to lose in the final to a little-known player called Vanja Ćorović of Serbia and Montenegro. Her next breakthrough followed in mid-August, as she came through qualifying into a $25k draw for the first time at Moscow, and defeated Oxana Lyubtsova in the main draw on the way to a quarterfinal defeat by fellow Russian Vasilisa Bardina.

The following week, she was wildcarded directly into a $25k draw at Balashikha, also in Russia, and bettered her career-best result set the previous week by battling through to the semifinals, after knocking out Israeli player Yevgenia Savransky in the quarterfinals, before she was once again defeated by Bardina in straight sets.

On her next attempt to qualify for a $25 tournament, at Tbilisi, Georgia in September, she lost in the qualifying round to Kristina Antoniychuk in straight sets, but was allowed into the main draw as a lucky loser, only to face Bardina for a third time in the first round. Despite winning a set from her fellow Russian for the first time, she lost the match in three.

Wildcarded into the $50k Batumi Ladies Open main draw, also in Georgia, at the end of that month, she reached the second round, then lost to another compatriot, Alla Kudryavtseva.

The next week, in early October, she was favoured with yet another wildcard into a main draw, and this time it was to be her first WTA Tour main draw. Nonetheless, she defeated compatriot Tatiana Panova in Round One and Hungarian talent Melinda Czink in round two to reach the quarterfinal stage at her début WTA event, but then lost a three-set clash to her compatriot Ekaterina Bychkova.

The ranking points accrued by this run of results were sufficient to afford her direct entry into the main draw of the next $25k contest she entered, which took place at Minsk in Belarus, early in November. In this instance, she won through to the quarterfinals, but was stopped a round short of her career-best performance at this level by emerging star Agnieszka Radwańska.

In mid-November she was forced to fight through qualifying to enter the popular $25k event at Průhonice in the Czech Republic, and succeeded in defeating future top-50 star Dominika Cibulková and Maša Zec Peškirič to achieve this end. But in the first round of the main draw she lost in two sets to Michaela Paštiková.

She did not play another match for the next three months, but ended the year ranked world No. 323.

=== 2006 ===
Returning to competition towards the end of February, she gained direct entry into a $50 tournament at St. Paul, Minnesota, and won her first-round tie before losing to Ahsha Rolle.

In her next two $25k tournaments, she endured early losses, but on returning from a month's break early in May to compete in a $25k event at Antalya-Manavgat, Turkey, she reached the quarterfinals after beating Aurélie Védy in a three-set second-round clash, but then was demolished 6–1, 6–1 by Romina Oprandi.

The following week, she gained entry into the qualifying draw of her first $75k tournament at Jounieh, Indonesia, and won through all three qualifying rounds in close three-set matches against little-known opponents to score her career-best qualifying achievement yet, but finally succumbed to compatriot Alla Kudryavtseva in the first round of the main draw. In July, she suffered another early loss in the main draw of a $25k tournament at Dnipropetrovsk, Ukraine, as she was trounced by unheralded Ukrainian Galyna Kosyk in the second round in straight sets.

But in August she returned to form by breezing through into the finals of a $25k tournament at Moscow and then vanquishing compatriot Ekaterina Makarova in a closely fought final, to win the first ITF title of her career at any level.

The following month, she qualified for her second $75k draw, and this time came away with two main-draw victories also to extend her winning streak to ten, at the expense of Jorgelina Cravero and Aleksandra Wozniak. In the quarterfinals, she lost to Peruvian Kristina Brandi.

The very next week, she won through qualifying into a $50k event at Ashland, Kentucky, and defeated Varvara Lepchenko in the second round of the main draw before losing to future top-20 star Ágnes Szávay in the quarterfinals.

As a direct entrant into the main draw of her next $50k tournament the following week, in early October, she was stopped in the second round by Ahsha Rolle, who this time defeated her easily for the loss of just two games.

Back in action again the week after at a $50k event at San Francisco, California, she lost in three sets at the first hurdle to American Neha Uberoi.

After returning to Russia, she reached another $25k quarterfinal at Podolsk at the end of that month before losing to compatriot Eugenia Grebenyuk, 2–6, 5–7.

But the very next week, at the start of November, she turned the tables on Grebenyuk in the quarterfinals of a $25k tournament at Minsk, dismissing her, and then narrowly defeated compatriot Anna Lapushchenkova at the semifinal stage, before sealing a comprehensive straight-sets tournament victory over Anastasia Pavlyuchenkova in the final, to take her career ITF singles title tally to two.

Later that month at Přerov in the Czech Republic, she cruised to the semifinals of another $25k event, before losing to British player Anne Keothavong 6–7, 2–6 in what would be the Russian's last match of the year.

Rodina had ended the year ranked 90 places higher than she began, at world No. 233, and had compiled a win–loss record for the year of 34–12.

=== 2007 ===
In January she entered qualifying for a WTA Tour event for the first time in her career. But far from being a minor-level event, it was a major that she chose to tackle first, more specifically the Australian Open. In the first round of the qualifying draw, she defeated Angela Haynes, but then she lost in the second to another American, Bethanie Mattek.

After taking the next month off from competition, she entered qualifying for the Tier-III tournament at Bogotá, Colombia in mid-February, and reached the qualifying round with two victories over South American players, before losing to a little-known Spaniard, Estrella Cabeza Candela.

A week later, she entered qualifying for another Tier-III event in the Americas, this time at Acapulco, Mexico. But she was drawn against German player Gréta Arn in the first round of qualifying, and ceded to her a close three-setter.

Returning to the ITF Circuit in March, she suffered a close first-round loss to Darya Kustova in the $25k event at Minsk before winning through to the finals at Moscow with victories over fellow-Russians Oxana Lyubtsova and Alisa Kleybanova, but then lost a very close final to Ekaterina Makarova, who thereby avenged her defeat at the hands of Rodina in the finals of another $25k event at Moscow the previous August. Staying with $25k events in April, she lost a very close first-round match to Casey Dellacqua at Biarritz, France, but the following week won through to the semifinals at Calvià, Spain, with a three-set quarterfinal victory against Petra Cetkovská, only to lose her semifinal tie to María José Martínez Sánchez in straight sets.

Late that month, she stepped back up to the $50k level at Torrent, Valencia, but lost in the second round to Maret Ani. Travelling to the Lebanon in May for the $75k tournament at Jounieh, she was upended in the first round by a little-known player from Slovakia, Zuzana Kučová, 6–1, 6–4. The following week, she reached the quarterfinals of a $50k tournament at Saint-Gaudens, France with wins over Margalita Chakhnashvili and Joanna Sakowicz, but was then demolished by Tatiana Perebiynis who allowed her only one game in the match. Towards the end of the month, she entered qualifying for a Grand Slam championships for the second time in her career, this time at the French Open, and defeated Hana Šromová of the Czech Republic in the first round, but then lost to Uzbek Akgul Amanmuradova.

In June, Rodina tried again at Wimbledon, but despite defeating her compatriot Galina Voskoboeva in the first round of qualifying, she then lost rather easily to Belarusian Olga Govortsova, 1–6, 2–6. After another month's break, she returned to action in late July at the $75k tournament at Pétange, Luxembourg, and made it through to the quarterfinal stage, before losing to Carla Suárez Navarro, 6–7, 1–6. In mid-August, she reached the quarterfinals of another $50k event at the Bronx, New York with wins over Swedish star Sofia Arvidsson and Dutch campaigner Elise Tamaëla, but then lost a quarterfinal to Austrian Yvonne Meusburger. The very next week, she entered qualifying for her fourth straight major of the year, and this time won two rounds at the expense of Elena Baltacha and Hana Šromová, but was defeated in three sets in the qualifying round by Olivia Sanchez.

In September, as a direct entrant to the $100k tournament at Kharkov, Ukraine, she reached the quarterfinal after notching up a straight-sets victory over another British player, Katie O'Brien, in the first round, but then lost to Anne Kremer from Luxembourg in the quarterfinals, 4–6, 1–6. At the end of the month, she achieved a career-first at Tashkent, Uzbekistan in qualifying for a WTA Tour main draw, by successively defeating both Marta Domachowska of Poland and her compatriot Anna Lapushchenkova in straight sets. Although it was only a Tier-IV event, these were both strong opponents to encounter in a qualifying draw; and she capitalised on her achievement by Zhang Shuai in the first round of the main draw, 6–3, 7–6. But then she faced Victoria Azarenka in round two, and ceded the match to her in two sets, so failing to equal her career best result set at the same event two years previously, although on that past occasion she had entered the tournament thanks to the award of a wildcard and did not encounter such tough second-round opposition.

Later the same week, she entered qualifying for the Tier-I event at Moscow, and toughed out three-set victories against compatriots Anastasia Pavlyuchenkova and Anastasia Pivovarova, before ultimately losing a three-setter to Australian former top-ten star, Alicia Molik, in the qualifying round.

Towards the end of the month, Rodina returned to the ITF Circuit once more at Podolsk, Russia, and this time fought past Galyna Kosyk in a three-set quarterfinal to avenge her crushing defeat at her hands back in July 2006. At the semifinal stage, she ousted Anastasia Pavlyuchenkova in another three-set tussle, but in the final she defeated Anna Lapushchenkova, against whom she has never yet lost, to earn her third career ITF singles title, and third at $25k level.

In early November, she entered a $50k tournament at Minsk, and after edging past a little-known fellow Russian in round one she successively defeated Viktoriya Kutuzova, Aravane Rezaï, and Ekaterina Dzehalevich to reach her career-first $50k final, having never previously made it past the quarterfinals at or above this level of event. Ironically, the final proved to be her easiest match of the tournament, as she virtually bulldozed Romanian Sorana Cîrstea for the loss of just one game each set, to take home her career-first $50k title. ´ The next two weeks were to prove less successful for Rodina. She first encountered Ekaterina Bychkova in the first round of the $50k event at Deauville, France, and was edged out by her in three sets. Next, after gaining direct entry into the main draw of the $100k event at Poitiers, France, she ran into Stéphanie Foretz and was defeated in two sets.

In December, however, she entered the $75k tournament at Dubai, United Arab Emirates, and enjoyed further success, with another victory over Anna Lapushchenkova in the second round, followed by the avenging of her previous defeat by Alla Kudryavtseva in the quarterfinals, though it was to be another close three-set match between them. These victories took her to her career-first $75k semifinal, where she met Yuliana Fedak of Ukraine, and vanquished her in two close sets, 6–4, 6–4. But in the first $75k final, she was faced with the challenge of playing erstwhile top-25 star Maria Kirilenko; and though the first set was close, it was to be Kirilenko who eventually ran away with the match, in straight sets.

Nonetheless, this performance lifted Rodina to a career-high ranking of world No. 120 on 17 December, a position she maintained at the end of the year, which had seen her surge upwards by a further one 113 places.

=== 2008 ===
Back in Australia a couple of days before the start of January 2008, she again tried her luck at qualifying for events on the WTA Tour, but suffered a rare bleak run of results as she lost in the first rounds of qualifying in all three tournaments she entered, falling to Julia Schruff of Germany at Gold Coast, to Yaroslava Shvedova at Hobart, and to Junri Namigata at the Australian Open.

But with few ranking points to defend from that time of year in 2007, she had slipped only three places on the WTA rankings list to world No. 123 by the start of February; and even a further first-round loss to Kaia Kanepi (3–6, 4–6) at the first tournament she played that month, the Tier-III event at Viña del Mar, Chile, was enough to drop her ranking only to 127th by the last week of February.

In late February, she reached the second round of the Tier-III tournament at Memphis, Tennessee by defeating former top-100 player (but then world No. 158) Anastasiya Yakimova of Belarus in round one, before losing heavily to Lindsay Davenport, 1–6, 1–6. The following week, early in March, she reached the second round of the $50k Las Vegas Open with a two-sets-win over Varvara Lepchenko, before losing to world No. 87 Yuan Meng, 2–6, 2–6 in the second round.

A reprieve from this disappointing run of finishes was just around the corner, however, as at the annual Tier-I event at Indian Wells held over two weeks in the middle of March, she came through two tough rounds of qualifying by defeating resurgent former top-50 star Sesil Karatantcheva of Bulgaria and world No. 117 Rossana de los Ríos of Paraguay, and then went on to defeat wildcarded fellow Russian Anastasia Pivovarova and French world No. 26, Virginie Razzano, to reach the third round of the main draw, before losing to world No. 31, Anabel Medina Garrigues. Her string of four victories at this tournament, albeit two in qualifying, was sufficient to lift her to a new career-high ranking of world No. 102 in the week beginning 24 March. In the French Open, her first direct entry into a major main draw, she took on the top seed and her compatriot, Maria Sharapova on the Philippe Chatrier Court, the largest court at Roland Garros. Rodina fought gamely and made a good account of herself, before Sharapova won 6–1, 3–6, 8–6.

=== 2018–2019: Top 70 debut ===
Rodina qualified for Wimbledon and then made it to the third round where she defeated No. 10 seed Madison Keys. In the fourth round, she clearly lost to Serena Williams but got a best new ranking of No. 71.

=== 2022–2023: Comeback ===
After more than three years of absence from WTA Tour and major events, she made her comeback at the 2022 US Open under a protected ranking. She defeated Martina Trevisan in the first round but lost to Ajla Tomljanović when the Aussie staged a come-from-behind win.

She entered the 2023 Australian Open also under a protected ranking but lost to qualifier and debutante at this major, Katie Volynets. She again used protected ranking to enter the WTA 1000 Indian Wells Open and the Miami Open, where she defeated Alizé Cornet and Bernarda Pera, respectively, and at the Charleston Open, the Rosmalen Open, and the Bad Homburg Open.

== Performance timelines ==
Key
W	F	SF	QF	#R	RR	Q#	P#	DNQ	A	Z#	PO	G	S	B	NMS	NTI	P	NH

(W) winner; (F) finalist; (SF) semifinalist; (QF) quarterfinalist; (#R) rounds 4, 3, 2, 1; (RR) round-robin stage; (Q#) qualification round; (P#) preliminary round; (DNQ) did not qualify; (A) absent; (Z#) Davis/Fed Cup Zonal Group (with number indication) or (PO) play-off; (G) gold, (S) silver or (B) bronze Olympic/Paralympic medal; (NMS) not a Masters tournament; (NTI) not a Tier I tournament; (P) postponed; (NH) not held; (SR) strike rate (events won / competed); (W–L) win–loss record.
To avoid confusion and double counting, these charts are updated at the conclusion of a tournament or when the player's participation has ended.

Only main-draw results in WTA Tour, Grand Slam tournaments, Fed Cup/Billie Jean King Cup and Olympic Games are included in win–loss records.

=== Singles ===
Tournament	2005	2006	2007	2008	2009	2010	2011	2012	2013	2014	2015	2016	2017	2018	2019	...	2022	2023	SR	W–L	Win%
Grand Slam tournaments
Australian Open	A	A	Q2	Q1	Q1	1R	2R	1R	A	A	1R	1R	1R	Q2	1R		A	1R	0 / 8	1–8	11%
French Open	A	A	Q2	1R	Q3	Q3	1R	A	A	A	1R	Q1	1R	Q3	1R		A	A	0 / 5	0–5	0%
Wimbledon	A	A	Q2	3R	Q2	Q2	2R	A	A	A	2R	2R	1R	4R	A		A	A	0 / 6	8–6	57%
US Open	A	A	Q3	1R	Q2	Q3	1R	A	A	Q1	2R	2R	2R	1R	A		2R	A	0 / 7	4–7	36%
Win–loss	0–0	0–0	0–0	2–3	0–0	0–1	2–4	0–1	0–0	0–0	2–4	2–3	1–4	3–2	0–2		1–1	0–1	0 / 26	13–26	33%
WTA 1000
Dubai / Qatar Open	NMS			A	A	A	A	A	A	A	Q2	Q2	A	A	A		A	A	0 / 0	0–0	–
Indian Wells Open	A	A	A	3R	1R	Q1	Q1	Q1	A	A	1R	Q1	2R	Q1	1R		A	2R	0 / 6	4–6	40%
Miami Open	A	A	A	Q1	A	Q1	Q1	Q1	A	A	1R	Q1	Q2	Q1	1R		A	2R	0 / 3	1–3	25%
Madrid Open	NH				A	A	Q1	A	A	A	A	A	Q2	A	A		A	A	0 / 0	0–0	–
Italian Open	A	A	A	Q1	A	A	A	A	A	A	A	A	A	A	A		A	A	0 / 0	0–0	–
Canadian Open	A	A	A	A	A	A	A	A	A	A	A	A	A	A	A		A	A	0 / 0	0–0	–
Cincinnati Open	NMS				A	A	A	A	A	A	Q1	Q1	Q1	Q1	A		A	A	0 / 0	0–0	–
Pan Pacific / Wuhan Open	A	A	A	A	A	A	A	A	A	A	A	A	A	A	A		NH	A	0 / 0	0–0	–
China Open	NMS				A	A	A	A	A	A	A	Q2	A	A	A		NH	A	0 / 0	0–0	–
Career statistics
Tournaments	1	0	1	9	4	4	12	2	1	0	17	13	18	11	15		2	4	Career total: 114		
Titles	0	0	0	0	0	0	0	0	0	0	0	0	0	0	0		0	0	Career total: 0		
Finals	0	0	0	0	0	0	0	0	0	0	0	1	0	0	0		0	0	Career total: 1		
Hard win–loss	2–1	0–0	1–1	3–5	2–3	3–3	7–7	1–2	0–1	0–0	10–9	4–9	7–11	3–7	2–7		2–2	2–3	0 / 71	49–71	41%
Clay win–loss	0–0	0–0	0–0	0–3	0–1	2–1	1–4	0–0	0–0	0–0	3–6	1–2	0–5	3–3	1–5		0–0	0–1	0 / 31	11–31	27%
Grass win–loss	0–0	0–0	0–0	2–1	0–0	0–0	1–1	0–0	0–0	0–0	1–2	3–2	2–2	3–1	1–3		0–0		0 / 12	13–12	52%
Overall win–loss	2–1	0–0	1–1	5–9	2–4	5–4	9–12	1–2	0–1	0–0	14–17	8–13	9–18	9–11	4–15		2–2	2–4	0 / 114	73–114	39%

== WTA Tour finals ==
=== Doubles: 1 (runner–up) ===
Legend WTA 500 WTA 250	Finals by surface Hard (0–0) Clay (0–1)

Result	Date	Tournament	Tier	Surface	Partner	Opponents	Score
Loss	Jul 2016	Swiss Open Gstaad	International (Note: The WTA International tournaments were reclassified as WTA 250 tournaments in 2021.)	Clay	(Germany) Annika Beck	(Spain) Lara Arruabarrena (Switzerland) Xenia Knoll	1–6, 6–3, [8–10]

== WTA Challenger finals ==
=== Singles: 2 (1 title, 1 runner-up) ===
Result	W–L	Date	Tournament	Surface	Opponent	Score
Win	1–0	Nov 2016	Taipei Open, Taiwan	Carpet (i)	(Chinese Taipei) Chang Kai-chen	6–4, 6–3
Loss	1–1	Nov 2018	Open de Limoges, France	Hard (i)	(Russia) Ekaterina Alexandrova	2–6, 2–6

=== Doubles: 1 (title) ===
Result	W–L	Date	Tournament	Surface	Partner	Opponents	Score
Win	1–0	Mar 2019	Indian Wells Challenger, United States	Hard	(Czech Republic) Kristýna Plíšková	(United States) Taylor Townsend (Belgium) Yanina Wickmayer	7–6^{(7)}, 6–4

== ITF Circuit finals ==
Legend
$100,000 tournaments
$75,000 tournaments
$50,000 tournaments
$25,000 tournaments
$10,000 tournaments

=== Singles: 20 (13 titles, 7 runner-ups) ===
Result	W–L	Date	Tournament	Tier	Surface	Opponent	Score
Loss	0–1	May 2005	ITF Dubrovnik, Croatia	10,000	Clay	(Serbia and Montenegro) Vanja Ćorović	4–6, 0–6
Win	1–1	Aug 2006	ITF Moscow, Russia	25,000	Clay	(Russia) Ekaterina Makarova	7–6^{(4)}, 6–3
Win	2–1	Nov 2006	ITF Minsk, Belarus	25,000	Carpet (i)	(Russia) Anastasia Pavlyuchenkova	6–4, 6–3
Loss	2–2	Apr 2007	ITF Moscow, Russia	25,000	Hard (i)	(Russia) Ekaterina Makarova	4–6, 7–6^{(6)}, 3–6
Win	3–2	Oct 2007	ITF Podolsk, Russia	25,000	Hard (i)	(Russia) Anna Lapushchenkova	6–1, 6–3
Win	4–2	Nov 2007	ITF Minsk, Belarus	50,000	Hard (i)	(Romania) Sorana Cîrstea	6–1, 6–1
Loss	4–3	Dec 2007	Dubai Tennis Challenge, UAE	75,000	Hard	(Russia) Maria Kirilenko	5–7, 2–6
Win	5–3	Apr 2009	ITF Khanty-Mansiysk, Russia	50,000	Carpet (i)	(Russia) Anna Lapushchenkova	6–3, 6–2
Win	6–3	Nov 2009	ITF Bratislava, Slovakia	50,000	Hard (i)	(Czech Republic) Renata Voráčová	6–4, 6–2
Win	7–3	Aug 2010	President's Cup, Kazakhstan	50,000	Hard	(Belarus) Ekaterina Dzehalevich	4–6, 6–1, 6–4
Loss	7–4	Nov 2010	ITF Bratislava, Slovakia	25,000	Hard (i)	(Ukraine) Kateryna Bondarenko	6–7^{(3–7)}, 2–6
Loss	7–5	Sep 2013	ITF Moscow, Russia	25,000	Clay	(Ukraine) Anastasiya Vasylyeva	2–6, 1–6
Win	8–5	Jul 2014	ITF Middelburg, Netherlands	25,000	Clay	(Netherlands) Angelique van der Meet	7–5, 7–5
Loss	8–6	Aug 2014	ITF Fleurus, Belgium	25,000	Clay	(Slovakia) Kristína Kučová	3–6, 4–6
Win	9–6	Sep 2014	ITF Moscow, Russia	25,000	Clay	(Switzerland) Xenia Knoll	7–6^{(2)}, 6–1
Loss	9–7	Sep 2014	ITF Moscow, Russia	25,000	Clay	(Russia) Vitalia Diatchenko	3–6, 1–6
Win	10–7	Sep 2014	ITF Dobrich, Bulgaria	25,000	Clay	(Romania) Andreea Mitu	3–6, 7–5, 6–3
Win	11–7	Nov 2014	ITF Sharm El Sheikh, Egypt	25,000	Hard	(Germany) Laura Siegemund	6–2, 6–2
Win	12–7	Nov 2014	ITF Sharm El Sheikh	25,000	Hard	(Germany) Laura Siegemund	5–7, 6–3, 6–2
Win	13–7	Jun 2016	Ilkley Trophy, UK	50,000	Grass	(Slovakia) Rebecca Šramková	6–4, 6–4

=== Doubles: 18 (6 titles, 12 runner-ups) ===
Result	W–L	Date	Tournament	Tier	Surface	Partner	Opponents	Score
Win	1–0	May 2005	ITF Dubrovnik, Croatia	10,000	Clay	(Ukraine) Natalia Bogdanova	(Slovenia) Tina Obrez (Slovenia) Meta Sevšek	4–6, 6–4, 6–4
Loss	1–1	Jul 2006	ITF Dnipropetrovsk, Ukraine	25,000	Clay	(Ukraine) Kristina Antoniychuk	(Ukraine) Olena Antypina (Russia) Nina Bratchikova	1–6, 7–5, 5–7
Loss	1–2	Aug 2006	ITF Moscow, Russia	25,000	Clay	(Romania) Mihaela Buzărnescu	(Russia) Maria Kondratieva (Russia) Ekaterina Makarova	6–4, 4–6, 1–6
Win	2–2	Oct 2006	ITF Podolsk, Russia	25,000	Hard (i)	(Russia) Anastasia Pavlyuchenkova	(Russia) Vasilisa Davydova (Belarus) Ekaterina Dzehalevich	6–1, 6–2
Loss	2–3	Nov 2006	ITF Minsk, Belarus	25,000	Carpet (i)	(Belarus) Ekaterina Dzehalevich	(Belarus) Darya Kustova (Russia) Ekaterina Makarova	4–6, 4–6
Loss	2–4	Mar 2007	ITF Minsk, Belarus	25,000	Carpet (i)	(Russia) Ekaterina Makarova	(Belarus) Darya Kustova (Belarus) Ekaterina Dzehalevich	6–4, 4–6, 4–6
Win	3–4	Mar 2007	ITF Moscow, Russia	25,000	Hard (i)	(Russia) Alisa Kleybanova	(Australia) Arina Rodionova (Belarus) Ekaterina Dzehalevich	7–6^{(2)}, 6–0
Win	4–4	Apr 2007	Open de Biarritz, France	25,000	Clay	(Israel) Yevgenia Savransky	(Russia) Ekaterina Lopes (France) Iryna Brémond	2–6, 6–1, 6–3
Win	5–4	Apr 2007	ITF Torrent, Spain	50,000	Clay	(Russia) Ekaterina Lopes	(Spain) Marta Marrero (Spain) Carla Suárez Navarro	7–6^{(7)}, 3–6, 6–2
Loss	5–5	Nov 2009	ITF Minsk, Belarus	50,000	Hard (i)	(Serbia) Vesna Dolonc	(Ukraine) Lyudmyla Kichenok (Ukraine) Nadiia Kichenok	3–6, 6–7^{(7–9)}
Loss	5–6	Jun 2011	Nottingham Trophy, UK	100,000	Grass	(Russia) Regina Kulikova	(Czech Republic) Eva Birnerová (Czech Republic) Petra Cetkovská	3–6, 2–6
Win	6–6	Aug 2013	Kazan Open, Russia	50,000	Hard	(Russia) Veronika Kudermetova	(Russia) Alexandra Artamonova (Czech Republic) Martina Borecká	5–7, 6–0, [10–8]
Loss	6–7	Dec 2013	ITF Madrid, Spain	25,000	Hard	(Bulgaria) Elitsa Kostova	(Netherlands) Demi Schuurs (Netherlands) Eva Wacanno	1–6, 2–6
Loss	6–8	May 2014	Empire Slovak Open, Slovakia	75,000	Clay	(Russia) Margarita Gasparyan	(Liechtenstein) Stephanie Vogt (China) Zheng Saisai	4–6, 2–6
Loss	6–9	May 2014	ITF Moscow, Russia	25,000	Clay	(Russia) Ekaterina Bychkova	(Kazakhstan) Anna Danilina (Switzerland) Xenia Knoll	3–6, 2–6
Loss	6–10	Jul 2014	ITF Middelburg, Netherlands	25,000	Clay	(Russia) Veronika Kudermetova	(Netherlands) Angelique van der Meet (Netherlands) Bernice van de Velde	6–7^{(4)}, 6–3, [5–10]
Loss	6–11	Aug 2014	ITF Westende, Belgium	25,000	Hard	(Russia) Marina Melnikova	(Belgium) Ysaline Bonaventure (Belgium) Elise Mertens	2–6, 2–6
Loss	6–12	May 2016	Empire Slovak Open	100,000	Clay	(Latvia) Anastasija Sevastova	(Russia) Anna Kalinskaya (Slovakia) Tereza Mihalíková	1–6, 6–7^{(4)}
