= WTA Swiss Open =

Professional tennis tournament

Ladies Open Lausanne

Defunct tennis tournament
- Event name: WTA Swiss Open (1977–85); European Open (1986–94); Ladies Championship Gstaad (2016–2018); Ladies Open Lausanne (2019–2023)
- Tour: WTA Tour
- Founded: 1899
- Abolished: 2023
- Location: Lausanne; Switzerland
- Category: WTA 250
- Surface: Clay (red) - outdoors
- Draw: 32S / 24Q / 16D
- Prize money: US$259,303 (2023)
- Website: ladiesopenlausanne.ch

The Ladies Open Lausanne was originally founded in 1899 as the Swiss International Championships. It was a women's professional tennis tournament last held in Lausanne but has been held in a number of locations in Switzerland.

== History ==
The Swiss International Championships was founded in 1897 as a men's only event and staged at the Grasshopper Club, Zurich under the auspices of the Swiss Lawn Tennis Association. In 1898 the Swiss Lawn Tennis Association staged the event at Château d’Oex. In 1899 an open women's singles event was added to the schedule, when the venue was still in Saint Moritz. It was then hosted at multiple locations throughout its run including Gstaad. The first edition of the Gstaad International tournament was played in 1915 at the Gstaad Palace Hotel, which was known at the time as the Royal Hotel, Winter & Gstaad Palace, and was organized in collaboration with the Lawn Tennis Club (LTC) Gstaad. In 1968 the tournament was renamed the Swiss Open International Championships or simply Swiss Open Championships, and was then staged permanently at Gstaad. The women's event was called the Gstaad International from 1969.

The Swiss International Championships were staged at the following locations throughout its run including Basel, Champéry, Geneva, Gstaad, Les Avants, Montreux, Lausanne, Lugano, Lucerne, Ragatz, St. Moritz, Zermatt, and Zurich from 1897 to 1967.

The event was called the WTA Swiss Open from 1977 to 1985, and was played on outdoor clay courts. The tournament underwent a name change in 1986, when it was titled the European Open until its discontinuation. It formed part of the Women's Tennis Association (WTA) Tour. When the WTA introduced the tiering format to its circuit, the event gradually moved up, from being a Tier V in 1988–1989, a Tier IV from 1990 to 1992, and a Tier III for its remaining years. The WTA announced that the tournament would return in Gstaad as a clay event on the 2016 Tour, replacing another clay court event held in Bad Gastein.

Four Swiss players won the event: Viktorija Golubic in 2016 as well as Manuela Maleeva (who formerly represented Bulgaria) in 1991 won the singles, and Xenia Knoll (in 2016) as well as Christiane Jolissaint won the doubles, the latter on three occasions: 1983, 1984, and 1988. Maleeva holds the record, along with Chris Evert, for most singles wins; both players won the event three times, and Maleeva finished runner-up a further three occasions.

In November 2023, it was announced that the tournament would cease existing, with the license bought out along with another WTA 250 tournament to form a WTA 500 tournament elsewhere.

== Past finals ==
=== Singles ===
Location	Year	Champions	Runners-up	Score
For historical winners of this event see Swiss International Championships 1899–1967
Lugano	1968	(South Africa) Annette Van Zyl DuPlooy	(West Germany) Helga Niessen	6–3, 6–3
Gstaad	1969	(France) Françoise Dürr	(United States) Rosie Casals	6–4, 4–6, 6–2
Gstaad	1970	(United States) Rosie Casals	(France) Françoise Dürr	6–2, 5–7, 6–2
Gstaad	1971	(France) Françoise Dürr (2)	(Australia) Lesley Hunt	6–3, 6–3
Gstaad	1972	(Japan) Kazuko Sawamatsu	(United States) Pam Teeguarden	6–3, 4–6, 6–2
Gstaad	1973	Not held		
Gstaad	1974	(West Germany) Helga Schultze	(Italy) Lea Pericoli	4–6, 6–4, 6–3
Gstaad	1975	(United Kingdom) Glynis Coles	(South Africa) Linky Boshoff	9–7, 2–6, 8–6
Gstaad	1976	(Belgium) Michèle Gurdal	(France) Gail Sherriff	4–6, 6–2, 6–3
Gstaad	1977	(Australia) Lesley Hunt	(Australia) Helen Gourlay	4–6, 7–5, 6–1
Gstaad	1978	(Romania) Virginia Ruzici	(Switzerland) Petra Delhees	6–2, 6–2
Gstaad	1979–80	Not held		
Lugano	1981	(United States) Chris Evert	(Romania) Virginia Ruzici	6–1, 6–1
Lugano	1982	(United States) Chris Evert (2)	(Hungary) Andrea Temesvári	6–0, 6–3
Lugano	1983	Cancelled after the third round because of rain		
Lugano	1984	(Bulgaria) Manuela Maleeva	(Czechoslovakia) Iva Budařová	6–1, 6–1
Lugano	1985	(United States) Bonnie Gadusek	(Bulgaria) Manuela Maleeva	6–2, 6–2
Lugano	1986	(Italy) Raffaella Reggi	(Bulgaria) Manuela Maleeva	5–7, 6–3, 7–6^{(8–6)}
Geneva	1987	(United States) Chris Evert (3)	(Bulgaria) Manuela Maleeva-Fragnière	6–3, 4–6, 6–2
Geneva	1988	(Austria) Barbara Paulus	(United States) Lori McNeil	6–4, 5–7, 6–1
Geneva	1989	(Bulgaria) Manuela Maleeva-Fragnière (2)	(Spain) Conchita Martínez	6–4, 6–0
Geneva	1990	(Austria) Barbara Paulus (2)	(Canada) Helen Kelesi	2–6, 7–5, 7–6^{(7–3)}
Geneva	1991	(Switzerland) Manuela Maleeva-Fragnière (3)	(Canada) Helen Kelesi	6–3, 3–6, 6–3
Lucerne	1992	(United States) Amy Frazier	(Czechoslovakia) Radka Zrubáková	6–4, 4–6, 7–5
Lucerne	1993	(United States) Lindsay Davenport	(Australia) Nicole Bradtke	6–1, 4–6, 6–2
Lucerne	1994	(United States) Lindsay Davenport (2)	(United States) Lisa Raymond	7–6^{(7–3)}, 6–4
Lucerne	1995–2015	Not held		
Gstaad	2016	(Switzerland) Viktorija Golubic	(Netherlands) Kiki Bertens	4–6, 6–3, 6–4
Gstaad	2017	(Netherlands) Kiki Bertens	(Estonia) Anett Kontaveit	6–4, 3–6, 6–1
Gstaad	2018	(France) Alizé Cornet	(Luxembourg) Mandy Minella	6–4, 7–6^{(8–6)}
Lausanne	2019	(France) Fiona Ferro	(France) Alizé Cornet	6–1, 2–6, 6–1
Lausanne	2020	Not held due to the coronavirus pandemic		
Lausanne	2021	(Slovenia) Tamara Zidanšek	(France) Clara Burel	4–6, 7–6^{(7–5)}, 6–1
Lausanne	2022	(Croatia) Petra Martić	(Serbia) Olga Danilović	6–4, 6–2
Lausanne	2023	(Italy) Elisabetta Cocciaretto	(France) Clara Burel	7–5, 4–6, 6–4

=== Doubles ===
Location	Year	Champions	Runners-up	Score
Gstaad	1971	(South Africa) Brenda Kirk (South Africa) Laura Rossouw	(France) Françoise Dürr (Italy) Lea Pericoli	8–6, 6–3
Gstaad	1972–73	Not held		
Gstaad	1974	(West Germany) Helga Schultze (Italy) Lea Pericoli	(Japan) Kayoko Fukuoka (Chile) Michelle Rodríguez	6–2, 6–0
Gstaad	1975	Not held		
Gstaad	1976	(United States) Betsy Nagelsen (Australia) Wendy Turnbull	(South Africa) Brigitte Cuypers (South Africa) Annette Van Zyl	6–4, 6–4
Gstaad	1977	(Australia) Helen Gourlay (United States) Rayni Fox	(United States) Mary Carillo (Australia) Lesley Hunt	6–0, 6–4
Gstaad	1978–80	Not held		
Lugano	1981	(South Africa) Rosalyn Fairbank (South Africa) Tanya Harford	(United States) Candy Reynolds (United States) Paula Smith	2–6, 6–1, 6–4
Lugano	1982	(United States) Candy Reynolds (United States) Paula Smith	(United States) Joanne Russell (Romania) Virginia Ruzici	6–2, 6–4
Lugano	1983	(Switzerland) Christiane Jolissaint (Netherlands) Marcella Mesker	(Switzerland) Petra Delhees (Brazil) Pat Medrado	6–2, 3–6, 7–5
Lugano	1984	(Switzerland) Christiane Jolissaint (Netherlands) Marcella Mesker	(Czechoslovakia) Iva Budařová (Czechoslovakia) Marcela Skuherská	6–4, 6–3
Lugano	1985	(United States) Bonnie Gadusek (Czechoslovakia) Helena Suková	(West Germany) Bettina Bunge (West Germany) Eva Pfaff	6–2, 6–4
Lugano	1986	(United States) Elise Burgin (United States) Betsy Nagelsen	(Australia) Jenny Byrne (Australia) Janine Thompson	6–2, 6–3
Geneva	1987	(United States) Betsy Nagelsen (Australia) Elizabeth Smylie	(Peru) Laura Gildemeister (France) Catherine Tanvier	4–6, 6–4, 6–3
Geneva	1988	(Switzerland) Christiane Jolissaint (South Africa) Dianne Van Rensburg	(Sweden) Maria Lindström (West Germany) Claudia Porwik	6–1, 6–3
Geneva	1989	(United States) Katrina Adams (United States) Lori McNeil	(Soviet Union) Larisa Neiland (Soviet Union) Natasha Zvereva	2–6, 6–3, 6–4
Geneva	1990	(Australia) Louise Field (South Africa) Dianne Van Rensburg	(United States) Elise Burgin (United States) Betsy Nagelsen	5–7, 7–6^{(7–2)}, 7–5
Geneva	1991	(Australia) Nicole Bradtke (Australia) Elizabeth Smylie	(Switzerland) Cathy Caverzasio (Switzerland) Manuela Maleeva-Fragnière	6–1, 6–2
Lucerne	1992	(Australia) Amy Frazier (South Africa) Elna Reinach	(Czechoslovakia) Karina Habšudová (United States) Marianne Werdel	7–5, 6–2
Lucerne	1993	(United States) Mary Joe Fernández (Czech Republic) Helena Suková	(United States) Lindsay Davenport (United States) Marianne Werdel	6–2, 6–4
Lucerne	1994	Canceled due to rain after two of the quarterfinals		
Lucerne	1995–2015	Not held		
Gstaad	2016	(Spain) Lara Arruabarrena (Switzerland) Xenia Knoll	(Germany) Annika Beck (Russia) Evgeniya Rodina	6–1, 3–6, [10–8]
Gstaad	2017	(Netherlands) Kiki Bertens (Sweden) Johanna Larsson	(Switzerland) Viktorija Golubic (Serbia) Nina Stojanović	7–6^{(7–4)}, 4–6, [10–7]
Gstaad	2018	(Chile) Alexa Guarachi (United States) Desirae Krawczyk	(Spain) Lara Arruabarrena (Switzerland) Timea Bacsinszky	4–6, 6–4, [10–6]
Lausanne	2019	(Russia) Anastasia Potapova (Russia) Yana Sizikova	(Australia) Monique Adamczak (China) Han Xinyun	6–2, 6–4
Lausanne	2020	Not held due to the coronavirus pandemic		
Lausanne	2021	(Switzerland) Susan Bandecchi (Switzerland) Simona Waltert	(Norway) Ulrikke Eikeri (Greece) Valentini Grammatikopoulou	6–3, 6–7^{(3–7)}, [10–5]
Lausanne	2022	(Serbia) Olga Danilović (France) Kristina Mladenovic	(Norway) Ulrikke Eikeri (Slovenia) Tamara Zidanšek	Walkover
Lausanne	2023	(Hungary) Anna Bondár (France) Diane Parry	Amina Anshba (Czech Republic) Anastasia Dețiuc	6–2, 6–1

== See also ==
- Swiss International Championships – men's (1897) and women's (1899) – the precursor tournament name for the ATP and WTA events
- Swiss Open – men's tournament
- Zurich Open – women's tournament (1984–2008)
