= 2017 Wimbledon Championships – Women's singles qualifying =

Women's singles qualifying
- 2017 Wimbledon Championships

Events
Singles	men	women		boys	girls
Doubles	men	women	mixed	boys	girls
WC Singles	men	women	quad
WC Doubles	men	women	quad
Legends	men	women	seniors

Qualification
Singles	men	women
Doubles	men	women
- Wimbledon Championships

Players and pairs who neither have high enough rankings nor receive wild cards may participate in a qualifying tournament held one week before the annual Wimbledon Tennis Championships.

== Seeds ==
1. (Serbia) Aleksandra Krunić (qualifying competition)
2. (Belgium) Alison Van Uytvanck (qualified)
3. (Tunisia) Ons Jabeur (qualified)
4. (China) Zhu Lin (qualifying competition)
5. (Russia) Anna Blinkova (qualified)
6. (United States) Kristie Ahn (qualifying competition)
7. (Romania) Patricia Maria Țig (first round)
8. (Colombia) Mariana Duque Mariño (qualifying competition)
9. (United States) Taylor Townsend (first round)
10. (United States) Kayla Day (first round)
11. (Germany) Tamara Korpatsch (qualifying competition)
12. (South Korea) Jang Su-jeong (first round)
13. (Belarus) Aryna Sabalenka (qualified)
14. (China) Liu Fangzhou (first round)
15. (Italy) Jasmine Paolini (second round)
16. (Croatia) Petra Martić (qualified)
17. (United States) Asia Muhammad (qualifying competition)
18. (Slovenia) Dalila Jakupović (first round)
19. (Czech Republic) Tereza Martincová (first round)
20. (Hungary) Dalma Gálfi (first round)
21. (Belarus) Olga Govortsova (first round)
22. (Czech Republic) Barbora Krejčíková (second round)
23. (Canada) Françoise Abanda (qualified)
24. (Serbia) Nina Stojanović (first round)

== Qualifiers ==
1. (Croatia) Petra Martić
2. (Belgium) Alison Van Uytvanck
3. (Tunisia) Ons Jabeur
4. (Canada) Françoise Abanda
5. (Russia) Anna Blinkova
6. (Belarus) Aryna Sabalenka
7. (Russia) Anastasia Potapova
8. (United States) Irina Falconi
9. (Slovenia) Polona Hercog
10. (Canada) Bianca Andreescu
11. (Australia) Arina Rodionova
12. (New Zealand) Marina Erakovic

== Qualifying draw ==
=== First qualifier ===
First round
1	(Serbia) Aleksandra Krunić	6	6
(North Macedonia) Lina Gjorcheska	4	4
(Slovakia) Rebecca Šramková	7	6
(United States) Danielle Collins	5	3
PR	(Romania) Mihaela Buzărnescu	2	7^{11}	6
(Netherlands) Arantxa Rus	6	6^{9}	2
(Turkey) Başak Eraydın	1	1
16/PR	(Croatia) Petra Martić	6	6

Second round
1	(Serbia) Aleksandra Krunić	6	6
(Slovakia) Rebecca Šramková	2	0
PR	(Romania) Mihaela Buzărnescu	6^{4}	3
16/PR	(Croatia) Petra Martić	7^{7}	6

Qualifying competition
1	(Serbia) Aleksandra Krunić	6	6^{4}	5
16/PR	(Croatia) Petra Martić	3	7^{7}	7

=== Second qualifier ===
First round
2	(Belgium) Alison Van Uytvanck	6	6
WC	(United Kingdom) Gabriella Taylor	0	2
WC	(United Kingdom) Katy Dunne	7	7
(Serbia) Ivana Jorović	5	5
(Spain) Georgina García Pérez	3	6	7
(United States) Sachia Vickery	6	3	9
(France) Myrtille Georges	6	6
19	(Czech Republic) Tereza Martincová	2	2

Second round
2	(Belgium) Alison Van Uytvanck	7	3	6
WC	(United Kingdom) Katy Dunne	5	6	2
(United States) Sachia Vickery	2	4
(France) Myrtille Georges	6	6

Qualifying competition
2	(Belgium) Alison Van Uytvanck	6	7
(France) Myrtille Georges	0	5

=== Third qualifier ===
First round
3	(Tunisia) Ons Jabeur	6	7^{7}
(Russia) Sofya Zhuk	3	6^{1}
(Thailand) Luksika Kumkhum	6	6
(Bulgaria) Viktoriya Tomova	0	3
(Japan) Miyu Kato	2	6	6
(France) Amandine Hesse	6	3	4
(Russia) Anastasiya Komardina	0	1
17	(United States) Asia Muhammad	6	6

Second round
3	(Tunisia) Ons Jabeur	7^{13}	6
(Thailand) Luksika Kumkhum	6^{11}	3
(Japan) Miyu Kato	1	6	2
17	(United States) Asia Muhammad	6	1	6

Qualifying competition
3	(Tunisia) Ons Jabeur	6	6
17	(United States) Asia Muhammad	4	0

=== Fourth qualifier ===
First round
4	(China) Zhu Lin	6	7
(Netherlands) Quirine Lemoine	3	5
(Russia) Viktoria Kamenskaya	2	4
(Czech Republic) Marie Bouzková	6	6
(Slovenia) Tamara Zidanšek	4	1
PR	(Russia) Alla Kudryavtseva	6	6
(Russia) Anna Kalinskaya	2	2
23	(Canada) Françoise Abanda	6	6

Second round
4	(China) Zhu Lin	3	6	6
(Czech Republic) Marie Bouzková	6	3	2
PR	(Russia) Alla Kudryavtseva	1	6	2
23	(Canada) Françoise Abanda	6	2	6

Qualifying competition
4	(China) Zhu Lin	4	3
23	(Canada) Françoise Abanda	6	6

=== Fifth qualifier ===
First round
5	(Russia) Anna Blinkova	6	6
(Switzerland) Conny Perrin	0	0
(Turkey) İpek Soylu	6	6
(Greece) Valentini Grammatikopoulou	4	3
(United States) Sofia Kenin	6	2	5
(Croatia) Jana Fett	4	6	7
WC	(United Kingdom) Eden Silva	5	2
15	(Italy) Jasmine Paolini	7	6

Second round
5	(Russia) Anna Blinkova	7	6
(Turkey) İpek Soylu	5	1
(Croatia) Jana Fett	6	1	7
15	(Italy) Jasmine Paolini	0	6	5

Qualifying competition
5	(Russia) Anna Blinkova	1	6	6
(Croatia) Jana Fett	6	3	3

=== Sixth qualifier ===
First round
6	(United States) Kristie Ahn	6	6
(Russia) Veronika Kudermetova	2	1
(Ukraine) Kateryna Kozlova	6	6
(United States) Grace Min	2	3
(United States) Jamie Loeb	6^{11}	6	6
(United States) Louisa Chirico	7^{13}	1	2
(South Korea) Han Na-lae	6	2	4
13	(Belarus) Aryna Sabalenka	4	6	6

Second round
6	(United States) Kristie Ahn	2	7^{7}	6
(Ukraine) Kateryna Kozlova	6	6^{4}	3
(United States) Jamie Loeb	6^{5}	4
13	(Belarus) Aryna Sabalenka	7^{7}	6

Qualifying competition
6	(United States) Kristie Ahn	1	1
13	(Belarus) Aryna Sabalenka	6	6

=== Seventh qualifier ===
First round
7	(Romania) Patricia Maria Țig	6^{1}	3
WC	(Russia) Anastasia Potapova	7^{7}	6
WC	(United Kingdom) Harriet Dart	6	3	7
(Turkey) Çağla Büyükakçay	4	6	9
(Argentina) Nadia Podoroska	3	7^{7}	6
(Portugal) Michelle Larcher de Brito	6	6^{4}	8
(Russia) Elizaveta Kulichkova	6	7
21	(Belarus) Olga Govortsova	3	5

Second round
WC	(Russia) Anastasia Potapova	6	6
(Turkey) Çağla Büyükakçay	4	4
(Portugal) Michelle Larcher de Brito	3	6	1
(Russia) Elizaveta Kulichkova	6	4	6

Qualifying competition
WC	(Russia) Anastasia Potapova	6	7
(Russia) Elizaveta Kulichkova	3	5

=== Eighth qualifier ===
First round
8	(Colombia) Mariana Duque Mariño	7^{7}	6^{2}	6
(Paraguay) Montserrat González	6^{3}	7^{7}	3
(Bulgaria) Isabella Shinikova	4	1
(Liechtenstein) Kathinka von Deichmann	6	6
(United States) Irina Falconi	7	6
(United Kingdom) Tara Moore	5	2
(Bulgaria) Elitsa Kostova	6	6
14	(China) Liu Fangzhou	4	1

Second round
8	(Colombia) Mariana Duque Mariño	3	6	6
(Liechtenstein) Kathinka von Deichmann	6	0	2
(United States) Irina Falconi	6	6
(Bulgaria) Elitsa Kostova	3	3

Qualifying competition
8	(Colombia) Mariana Duque Mariño	1	4
(United States) Irina Falconi	6	6

=== Ninth qualifier ===
First round
9	(United States) Taylor Townsend	6^{7}	3
(Slovenia) Polona Hercog	7^{9}	6
(Romania) Irina Bara	4	4
(Austria) Barbara Haas	6	6
WC	(United Kingdom) Katie Swan	3	7	0
(Uzbekistan) Nigina Abduraimova	6	5	6
(Germany) Antonia Lottner	1	7	6
20	(Hungary) Dalma Gálfi	6	5	1

Second round
(Slovenia) Polona Hercog	6	7^{9}
(Austria) Barbara Haas	4	6^{7}
(Uzbekistan) Nigina Abduraimova	2	1
(Germany) Antonia Lottner	6	6

Qualifying competition
(Slovenia) Polona Hercog	6	1	6
(Germany) Antonia Lottner	2	6	3

=== Tenth qualifier ===
First round
10	(United States) Kayla Day	3	3
(Canada) Bianca Andreescu	6	6
(Japan) Akiko Omae	6	6
(Hungary) Fanny Stollár	1	3
(Russia) Polina Monova	6	2	6
(Italy) Martina Trevisan	4	6	3
(Slovakia) Viktória Kužmová	7^{7}	6
19	(Slovenia) Dalila Jakupović	6^{5}	2

Second round
(Canada) Bianca Andreescu	6	7
(Japan) Akiko Omae	3	5
(Russia) Polina Monova	6^{1}	3
(Slovakia) Viktória Kužmová	7^{7}	6

Qualifying competition
(Canada) Bianca Andreescu	6	6
(Slovakia) Viktória Kužmová	4	3

=== Eleventh qualifier ===
First round
11	(Germany) Tamara Korpatsch	6	3	6
(United States) Jacqueline Cako	4	6	2
(Australia) Lizette Cabrera	6	4	6
(Czech Republic) Tereza Smitková	2	6	2
(Netherlands) Lesley Kerkhove	1	5
PR	(Estonia) Kaia Kanepi	6	7
(Australia) Arina Rodionova	6	6
24	(Serbia) Nina Stojanović	3	4

Second round
11	(Germany) Tamara Korpatsch	6	6
(Australia) Lizette Cabrera	3	3
PR	(Estonia) Kaia Kanepi	6	2	5
(Australia) Arina Rodionova	2	6	7

Qualifying competition
11	(Germany) Tamara Korpatsch	3	3
(Australia) Arina Rodionova	6	6

=== Twelfth qualifier ===
First round
12	(South Korea) Jang Su-jeong	3	2
PR	(Sweden) Rebecca Peterson	6	6
(New Zealand) Marina Erakovic	4	6	6
(Switzerland) Amra Sadiković	6	3	2
(Australia) Destanee Aiava	6	6
WC	(United Kingdom) Freya Christie	3	0
WC	(United Kingdom) Maia Lumsden	6	6^{1}	8
22	(Czech Republic) Barbora Krejčíková	4	7^{7}	10

Second round
PR	(Sweden) Rebecca Peterson	1	5
(New Zealand) Marina Erakovic	6	7
(Australia) Destanee Aiava	6	6
22	(Czech Republic) Barbora Krejčíková	2	1

Qualifying competition
(New Zealand) Marina Erakovic	6	6
(Australia) Destanee Aiava	3	2
