= 2017 Wimbledon Championships – Men's singles qualifying =

Men's singles qualifying
- 2017 Wimbledon Championships

Events
Singles	men	women		boys	girls
Doubles	men	women	mixed	boys	girls
WC Singles	men	women	quad
WC Doubles	men	women	quad
Legends	men	women	seniors

Qualification
Singles	men	women
Doubles	men	women
- Wimbledon Championships

Players and pairs who neither have high enough rankings nor receive wild cards may participate in a qualifying tournament held one week before the annual Wimbledon Tennis Championships.

== Seeds ==
1. (Italy) Alessandro Giannessi (first round)
2. (Colombia) Santiago Giraldo (first round)
3. (United States) Tennys Sandgren (second round)
4. (Slovakia) Lukáš Lacko (qualifying competition)
5. (Russia) Andrey Rublev (qualified)
6. (Japan) Go Soeda (second round)
7. (Slovenia) Blaž Kavčič (first round, retired)
8. (Barbados) Darian King (qualifying competition)
9. (Ukraine) Illya Marchenko (qualified)
10. (Italy) Luca Vanni (first round)
11. (Ukraine) Sergiy Stakhovsky (qualified)
12. (Belgium) Ruben Bemelmans (qualified)
13. (Serbia) Laslo Đere (first round)
14. (Germany) Maximilian Marterer (first round)
15. (Canada) Peter Polansky (qualifying competition)
16. (Russia) Konstantin Kravchuk (second round)
17. (United States) Reilly Opelka (first round)
18. (Austria) Jürgen Melzer (first round)
19. (Kazakhstan) Alexander Bublik (qualifying competition, lucky loser)
20. (France) Paul-Henri Mathieu (qualifying competition)
21. (United States) Taylor Fritz (qualified)
22. (United States) Bjorn Fratangelo (second round)
23. (Germany) Peter Gojowczyk (qualified)
24. (France) Stéphane Robert (first round)
25. (France) Quentin Halys (second round)
26. (Czech Republic) Jan Šátral (first round)
27. (Austria) Gerald Melzer (qualifying competition)
28. (Spain) Adrián Menéndez-Maceiras (second round)
29. (Spain) Roberto Carballés Baena (first round)
30. (South Korea) Lee Duck-hee (first round)
31. (Slovakia) Andrej Martin (first round)
32. (United States) Stefan Kozlov (second round)

== Qualifiers ==
1. (Italy) Simone Bolelli
2. (Greece) Stefanos Tsitsipas
3. (United States) Taylor Fritz
4. (Germany) Peter Gojowczyk
5. (Russia) Andrey Rublev
6. (United Kingdom) Alexander Ward
7. (Australia) Andrew Whittington
8. (Czech Republic) Lukáš Rosol
9. (Ukraine) Illya Marchenko
10. (Germany) Daniel Brands
11. (Ukraine) Sergiy Stakhovsky
12. (Belgium) Ruben Bemelmans
13. (Chile) Christian Garín
14. (Austria) Sebastian Ofner
15. (Italy) Stefano Travaglia
16. (Chile) Nicolás Jarry

== Lucky loser ==
1. (Kazakhstan) Alexander Bublik

== Qualifying draw ==
=== First qualifier ===
First round
1	(Italy) Alessandro Giannessi	6	3	4
(Portugal) Pedro Sousa	4	6	6
(France) Gleb Sakharov	4	4
(Canada) Steven Diez	6	6
(Australia) Sam Groth	6^{3}	6	9
PR	(Italy) Simone Bolelli	7^{7}	2	11
(Germany) Tobias Kamke	6	3	4
28	(Spain) Adrián Menéndez-Maceiras	3	6	6

Second round
(Portugal) Pedro Sousa	7	2	6
(Canada) Steven Diez	5	6	2
PR	(Italy) Simone Bolelli	6	6
28	(Spain) Adrián Menéndez-Maceiras	4	4

Qualifying competition
(Portugal) Pedro Sousa	2	3	2
PR	(Italy) Simone Bolelli	6	6	6

=== Second qualifier ===
First round
2	(Colombia) Santiago Giraldo	6	4	3
(Greece) Stefanos Tsitsipas	2	6	6
(Italy) Federico Gaio	4	3
(Germany) Yannick Hanfmann	6	6
(Hungary) Attila Balázs	5	6^{7}
(Belgium) Joris De Loore	7	7^{9}
(Slovakia) Jozef Kovalík	7^{7}	6
29	(Spain) Roberto Carballés Baena	6^{3}	4

Second round
(Greece) Stefanos Tsitsipas	7^{7}	7^{7}
(Germany) Yannick Hanfmann	6^{5}	6^{5}
(Belgium) Joris De Loore	3	7	6
(Slovakia) Jozef Kovalík	6	5	3

Qualifying competition
(Greece) Stefanos Tsitsipas	6	3	6	3	7
(Belgium) Joris De Loore	3	6	3	6	5

=== Third qualifier ===
First round
3	(United States) Tennys Sandgren	6	7
(United States) Michael Mmoh	3	5
(France) Vincent Millot	7	3	6
(Italy) Stefano Napolitano	5	6	3
(Czech Republic) Václav Šafránek	7^{7}	2	1
PR	(Colombia) Alejandro González	6^{2}	6	6
(Switzerland) Marco Chiudinelli	3	7	1
21	(United States) Taylor Fritz	6	5	6

Second round
3	(United States) Tennys Sandgren	2	6^{5}
(France) Vincent Millot	6	7^{7}
PR	(Colombia) Alejandro González	1	3
21	(United States) Taylor Fritz	6	6

Qualifying competition
(France) Vincent Millot	3	5	4
21	(United States) Taylor Fritz	6	7	6

=== Fourth qualifier ===
First round
4	(Slovakia) Lukáš Lacko	6	6
(Japan) Hiroki Moriya	3	3
(Italy) Andrea Arnaboldi	4	6	6
(Bosnia and Herzegovina) Aldin Šetkić	6	3	4
(Serbia) Nikola Milojević	6	6
(Spain) Enrique López-Pérez	3	4
(Bosnia and Herzegovina) Mirza Bašić	0	3
23	(Germany) Peter Gojowczyk	6	6

Second round
4	(Slovakia) Lukáš Lacko	7^{7}	6
(Italy) Andrea Arnaboldi	6^{4}	4
(Serbia) Nikola Milojević	3	6^{5}
23	(Germany) Peter Gojowczyk	6	7^{7}

Qualifying competition
4	(Slovakia) Lukáš Lacko	5	2	3
23	(Germany) Peter Gojowczyk	7	6	6

=== Fifth qualifier ===
First round
5	(Russia) Andrey Rublev	6	6
(Portugal) João Domingues	3	3
(Republic of Ireland) James McGee	6^{6}	6	6
(Spain) Rubén Ramírez Hidalgo	7^{8}	3	4
(Czech Republic) Petr Michnev	3	1
(Argentina) Máximo González	6	6
(Belgium) Yannik Reuter	6^{5}	2
20	(France) Paul-Henri Mathieu	7^{7}	6

Second round
5	(Russia) Andrey Rublev	6	4	6
(Republic of Ireland) James McGee	3	6	2
(Argentina) Máximo González	1	4
20	(France) Paul-Henri Mathieu	6	6

Qualifying competition
5	(Russia) Andrey Rublev	6	1	7^{13}	6
20	(France) Paul-Henri Mathieu	4	6	6^{11}	4

=== Sixth qualifier ===
First round
6	(Japan) Go Soeda	3	7	9
(Spain) Íñigo Cervantes	6	5	7
(Belarus) Egor Gerasimov	6	5	3
WC	(United Kingdom) Alexander Ward	1	7	6
(Belarus) Ilya Ivashka	6^{8}	6	4
(Slovenia) Grega Žemlja	7^{10}	3	6
(Russia) Teymuraz Gabashvili	7	7^{7}
26	(Czech Republic) Jan Šátral	5	6^{4}

Second round
6	(Japan) Go Soeda	3	1
WC	(United Kingdom) Alexander Ward	6	6
(Slovenia) Grega Žemlja	5	3
(Russia) Teymuraz Gabashvili	7	6

Qualifying competition
WC	(United Kingdom) Alexander Ward	6^{3}	6	7^{8}	6
(Russia) Teymuraz Gabashvili	7^{7}	4	6^{6}	1

=== Seventh qualifier ===
First round
7	(Slovenia) Blaž Kavčič	1	0^{r}
(Italy) Riccardo Bellotti	6	4
(United States) Denis Kudla	5	7	13
(Japan) Akira Santillan	7	5	11
(Germany) Yannick Maden	6^{3}	2
(United States) Tim Smyczek	7^{7}	6
(Australia) Andrew Whittington	3	7	6
24	(France) Stéphane Robert	6	5	4

Second round
(Italy) Riccardo Bellotti	1	1
(United States) Denis Kudla	6	6
(United States) Tim Smyczek	7^{7}	4	4
(Australia) Andrew Whittington	6^{4}	6	6

Qualifying competition
(United States) Denis Kudla	6	6	6^{7}	6^{3}	0
(Australia) Andrew Whittington	4	2	7^{9}	7^{7}	6

=== Eighth qualifier ===
First round
8	(Barbados) Darian King	6	6
(Italy) Lorenzo Giustino	4	0
PR	(United States) Bradley Klahn	6	6
(South Korea) Kwon Soon-woo	3	4
(Czech Republic) Lukáš Rosol	7^{7}	7^{8}
(Chinese Taipei) Jason Jung	6^{5}	6^{6}
(United States) Rajeev Ram	7^{8}	7^{7}
17	(United States) Reilly Opelka	6^{6}	6^{5}

Second round
8	(Barbados) Darian King	3	6	6
PR	(United States) Bradley Klahn	6	1	4
(Czech Republic) Lukáš Rosol	6	1	6
(United States) Rajeev Ram	2	6	2

Qualifying competition
8	(Barbados) Darian King	4	6	3	4
(Czech Republic) Lukáš Rosol	6	3	6	6

=== Ninth qualifier ===
First round
9	(Ukraine) Illya Marchenko	7^{7}	7
(Serbia) Filip Krajinović	6^{4}	5
(Japan) Yasutaka Uchiyama	6	3	4
(Germany) Benjamin Becker	3	6	6
WC	(United Kingdom) Liam Broady	6	6
PR	(Canada) Frank Dancevic	2	3
WC	(United Kingdom) Marcus Willis	7	7
31	(Slovakia) Andrej Martin	5	5

Second round
9	(Ukraine) Illya Marchenko	3	7^{7}	6
(Germany) Benjamin Becker	6	6^{3}	4
WC	(United Kingdom) Liam Broady	6^{2}	7^{7}	2
WC	(United Kingdom) Marcus Willis	7^{7}	6^{2}	6

Qualifying competition
9	(Ukraine) Illya Marchenko	6	6	7^{7}
WC	(United Kingdom) Marcus Willis	4	1	6^{4}

=== Tenth qualifier ===
First round
10	(Italy) Luca Vanni	6	6^{4}	11
(France) Calvin Hemery	2	7^{7}	13
(Germany) Oscar Otte	4	4
(Germany) Daniel Brands	6	6
(Germany) Jeremy Jahn	4	4
(Australia) Blake Mott	6	6
(Spain) Daniel Gimeno Traver	0	3
19	(Kazakhstan) Alexander Bublik	6	6

Second round
(France) Calvin Hemery	4	4
(Germany) Daniel Brands	6	6
(Australia) Blake Mott	5	4
19	(Kazakhstan) Alexander Bublik	7	6

Qualifying competition
(Germany) Daniel Brands	6	3	4	6	12
19	(Kazakhstan) Alexander Bublik	3	6	6	2	10

=== Eleventh qualifier ===
First round
11	(Ukraine) Sergiy Stakhovsky	6	6
(France) Kenny de Schepper	3	4
WC	(United Kingdom) Edward Corrie	6	3	1
(Ecuador) Roberto Quiroz	4	6	6
(Japan) Tatsuma Ito	6	6
PR	(Croatia) Matija Pecotić	2	2
(Australia) Alex De Minaur	2	6	6
18	(Austria) Jürgen Melzer	6	3	3

Second round
11	(Ukraine) Sergiy Stakhovsky	6	7
(Ecuador) Roberto Quiroz	3	5
(Japan) Tatsuma Ito	6	6
(Australia) Alex De Minaur	2	4

Qualifying competition
11	(Ukraine) Sergiy Stakhovsky	6	6^{1}	6^{6}	6	8
(Japan) Tatsuma Ito	3	7^{7}	7^{8}	4	6

=== Twelfth qualifier ===
First round
12	(Belgium) Ruben Bemelmans	3	6	6
(France) Tristan Lamasine	6	1	3
(United States) Mitchell Krueger	3	4
(France) Mathias Bourgue	6	6
(Chinese Taipei) Chen Ti	7^{7}	3	6
(Spain) Ricardo Ojeda Lara	6^{5}	6	2
(Argentina) Federico Coria	3	0
27	(Austria) Gerald Melzer	6	6

Second round
12	(Belgium) Ruben Bemelmans	6	3	6
(France) Mathias Bourgue	4	6	3
(Chinese Taipei) Chen Ti	5	2
27	(Austria) Gerald Melzer	7	6

Qualifying competition
12	(Belgium) Ruben Bemelmans	6	7	6
27	(Austria) Gerald Melzer	4	5	3

=== Thirteenth qualifier ===
First round
13	(Serbia) Laslo Đere	2	7^{7}	2
(Australia) John-Patrick Smith	6	6^{5}	6
(United States) Mackenzie McDonald	7	6
WC	(United Kingdom) Daniel Cox	5	1
(Chile) Christian Garín	6	6
(Italy) Gianluigi Quinzi	4	3
(Germany) Daniel Masur	2	0^{r}
22	(United States) Bjorn Fratangelo	6	0

Second round
(Australia) John-Patrick Smith	6	6^{5}	6
(United States) Mackenzie McDonald	4	7^{7}	3
(Chile) Christian Garín	6^{4}	7	6
22	(United States) Bjorn Fratangelo	7^{7}	5	4

Qualifying competition
(Australia) John-Patrick Smith	6	6^{7}	4	6	10
(Chile) Christian Garin	4	7^{9}	6	4	12

=== Fourteenth qualifier ===
First round
14	(Germany) Maximilian Marterer	3	6^{4}
(Serbia) Miljan Zekić	6	7^{7}
(Belgium) Kimmer Coppejans	6^{4}	6	8
(Austria) Sebastian Ofner	7^{7}	3	10
(El Salvador) Marcelo Arévalo	3	4
WC	(United Kingdom) Jay Clarke	6	6
(Sweden) Elias Ymer	6	6
30	(South Korea) Lee Duck-hee	3	2

Second round
(Serbia) Miljan Zekić	4	3
(Austria) Sebastian Ofner	6	6
WC	(United Kingdom) Jay Clarke	6	7^{7}
(Sweden) Elias Ymer	4	6^{5}

Qualifying competition
(Austria) Sebastian Ofner	2	6^{9}	6	6	6
WC	(United Kingdom) Jay Clarke	6	7^{11}	4	4	1

=== Fifteenth qualifier ===
First round
15	(Canada) Peter Polansky	6	7^{7}
(Argentina) Marco Trungelliti	2	6^{3}
WC	(United Kingdom) Neil Pauffley	0^{r}
(Kazakhstan) Aleksandr Nedovyesov	5
(Italy) Stefano Travaglia	6	7
(Italy) Salvatore Caruso	3	5
WC	(United Kingdom) Ryan James Storrie	5	4
25	(France) Quentin Halys	7	6

Second round
15	(Canada) Peter Polansky	7	6
(Kazakhstan) Aleksandr Nedovyesov	5	3
(Italy) Stefano Travaglia	7	6
25	(France) Quentin Halys	5	0

Qualifying competition
15	(Canada) Peter Polansky	4	6	6	4	4
(Italy) Stefano Travaglia	6	4	3	6	6

=== Sixteenth qualifier ===
First round
16	(Russia) Konstantin Kravchuk	7^{7}	6
(Italy) Matteo Donati	6^{4}	2
WC	(United Kingdom) Lloyd Glasspool	3	1
(Chile) Nicolás Jarry	6	6
(United States) Dennis Novikov	6	7^{7}
(China) Wu Di	4	6^{3}
(Australia) Marc Polmans	4	5
32	(United States) Stefan Kozlov	6	7

Second round
16	(Russia) Konstantin Kravchuk	5	6	9
(Chile) Nicolás Jarry	7	4	11
(United States) Dennis Novikov	7	6
32	(United States) Stefan Kozlov	5	2

Qualifying competition
(Chile) Nicolás Jarry	4	6	6	6
(United States) Dennis Novikov	6	3	4	4
