= 2017 Wimbledon Championships – Women's doubles qualifying =

Women's doubles qualifying
- 2017 Wimbledon Championships

Events
Singles	men	women		boys	girls
Doubles	men	women	mixed	boys	girls
WC Singles	men	women	quad
WC Doubles	men	women	quad
Legends	men	women	seniors

Qualification
Singles	men	women
Doubles	men	women
- Wimbledon Championships

Players and pairs who neither have high enough rankings nor receive wild cards may participate in a qualifying tournament held one week before the annual Wimbledon Tennis Championships.

== Seeds ==
1. (Russia) Natela Dzalamidze / (Russia) Veronika Kudermetova (qualified)
2. (Poland) Paula Kania / (Serbia) Nina Stojanović (qualified)
3. (Australia) Monique Adamczak / (Australia) Storm Sanders (qualified)
4. (Turkey) İpek Soylu / (Thailand) Varatchaya Wongteanchai (qualified)
5. (Netherlands) Lesley Kerkhove / (Belarus) Lidziya Marozava (qualifying competition, lucky losers)
6. (Germany) Nicola Geuer / (Slovenia) Dalila Jakupović (qualifying competition)
7. (Australia) Jessica Moore / (Japan) Akiko Omae (qualifying competition, lucky losers)
8. (United States) Ashley Weinhold / (United States) Caitlin Whoriskey (qualifying competition, lucky losers)

== Qualifiers ==
1. (Russia) Natela Dzalamidze / (Russia) Veronika Kudermetova
2. (Poland) Paula Kania / (Serbia) Nina Stojanović
3. (Australia) Monique Adamczak / (Australia) Storm Sanders
4. (Turkey) İpek Soylu / (Thailand) Varatchaya Wongteanchai

== Lucky losers ==
1. (Netherlands) Lesley Kerkhove / (Belarus) Lidziya Marozava
2. (Australia) Jessica Moore / (Japan) Akiko Omae
3. (United States) Ashley Weinhold / (United States) Caitlin Whoriskey

== Qualifying draw ==
=== First qualifier ===
First round
1	(Russia) Natela Dzalamidze (Russia) Veronika Kudermetova	5	6	6
(Russia) Irina Khromacheva (Belgium) Maryna Zanevska	7	3	1
(North Macedonia) Lina Gjorcheska (Russia) Polina Monova	3	6^{6}
8	(United States) Ashley Weinhold (United States) Caitlin Whoriskey	6	7^{8}

Qualifying competition
1	(Russia) Natela Dzalamidze (Russia) Veronika Kudermetova	6	6
8	(United States) Ashley Weinhold (United States) Caitlin Whoriskey	4	4

=== Second qualifier ===
First round
2	(Poland) Paula Kania (Serbia) Nina Stojanović	6	6
WC	(United Kingdom) Tara Moore (Switzerland) Conny Perrin	4	0
(China) Liu Fangzhou (China) Zhu Lin	3	6^{5}
6	(Germany) Nicola Geuer (Slovenia) Dalila Jakupović	6	7^{7}

Qualifying competition
2	(Poland) Paula Kania (Serbia) Nina Stojanović	6	6
6	(Germany) Nicola Geuer (Slovenia) Dalila Jakupović	4	1

=== Third qualifier ===
First round
3	(Australia) Monique Adamczak (Australia) Storm Sanders	7^{7}	6
WC	(United Kingdom) Freya Christie (United Kingdom) Gabriella Taylor	6^{0}	4
(Slovakia) Jana Čepelová (Belarus) Aliaksandra Sasnovich	5	3
7	(Australia) Jessica Moore (Japan) Akiko Omae	7	6

Qualifying competition
3	(Australia) Monique Adamczak (Australia) Storm Sanders	6	7
7	(Australia) Jessica Moore (Japan) Akiko Omae	4	5

=== Fourth qualifier ===
First round
4	(Turkey) İpek Soylu (Thailand) Varatchaya Wongteanchai	1	6	6
(Czech Republic) Denisa Allertová (Slovakia) Kristína Kučová	6	0	1
(United States) Kristie Ahn (United States) Madison Brengle	4	6	5
5	(Netherlands) Lesley Kerkhove (Belarus) Lidziya Marozava	6	3	7

Qualifying competition
4	(Turkey) İpek Soylu (Thailand) Varatchaya Wongteanchai	2	6	6
5	(Netherlands) Lesley Kerkhove (Belarus) Lidziya Marozava	6	3	3
