= 2017 Wimbledon Championships – Day-by-day summaries =

The 2017 Wimbledon Championships are described below in detail, in the form of day-by-day summaries.

== Day 1 (3 July) ==
- Seeds out:
  - Gentlemen's Singles: (Switzerland) Stan Wawrinka [5], (Australia) Nick Kyrgios [20], (Croatia) Ivo Karlović [21], (Spain) Fernando Verdasco [31]
  - Ladies' Singles: (Croatia) Mirjana Lučić-Baroni [26], (Italy) Roberta Vinci [31]
- Schedule of play

Matches on main courts
Matches on Centre Court
| Event | Winner | Loser | Score |
|---|---|---|---|
| Gentlemen's Singles 1st Round | (United Kingdom) Andy Murray [1] | (Kazakhstan) Alexander Bublik [LL] | 6–1, 6–4, 6–2 |
| Ladies' Singles 1st Round | (Czech Republic) Petra Kvitová [11] | (Sweden) Johanna Larsson | 6–3, 6–4 |
| Gentlemen's Singles 1st Round | (Russia) Daniil Medvedev | (Switzerland) Stan Wawrinka [5] | 6–4, 3–6, 6–4, 6–1 |
Matches on No. 1 Court
| Event | Winner | Loser | Score |
| Ladies' Singles 1st Round | (United States) Venus Williams [10] | (Belgium) Elise Mertens | 7–6^{(9–7)}, 6–4 |
| Gentlemen's Singles 1st Round | (Spain) Rafael Nadal [4] | (Australia) John Millman [PR] | 6–1, 6–3, 6–2 |
| Ladies' Singles 1st Round | (United Kingdom) Johanna Konta [6] | (Chinese Taipei) Hsieh Su-wei | 6–2, 6–2 |
| Ladies' Singles 1st Round | (Belarus) Victoria Azarenka [PR] | (United States) Catherine Bellis | 3–6, 6–2, 6–1 |
Matches on No. 2 Court
| Event | Winner | Loser | Score |
| Gentlemen's Singles 1st Round | (France) Jo-Wilfried Tsonga [12] | (United Kingdom) Cameron Norrie [WC] | 6–3, 6–2, 6–2 |
| Ladies' Singles 1st Round | (Romania) Simona Halep [2] | (New Zealand) Marina Erakovic [Q] | 6–4, 6–1 |
| Gentlemen's Singles 1st Round | (Croatia) Marin Čilić [7] | (Germany) Philipp Kohlschreiber | 6–4, 6–2, 6–3 |
| Ladies' Singles 1st Round | (United Kingdom) Heather Watson [WC] | (Belgium) Maryna Zanevska | 6–1, 7–6^{(7–5)} |
| Ladies' Singles 1st Round | (Spain) Carla Suárez Navarro [25] | (Canada) Eugenie Bouchard | 1–6, 6–1, 6–1 |
Matches on No. 3 Court
| Event | Winner | Loser | Score |
| Gentlemen's Singles 1st Round | (France) Pierre-Hugues Herbert | (Australia) Nick Kyrgios [20] | 6–3, 6–4, retired |
| Ladies' Singles 1st Round | (Ukraine) Elina Svitolina [4] | (Australia) Ashleigh Barty | 7–5, 7–6^{(10–8)} |
| Gentlemen's Singles 1st Round | (United Kingdom) Aljaž Bedene | (Croatia) Ivo Karlović [21] | 6–7^{(5–7)}, 7–6^{(8–6)}, 6–7^{(7–9)}, 7–6^{(9–7)}, 8–6 |

== Day 2 (4 July) ==
- Seeds out:
  - Gentlemen's Singles: (Spain) Feliciano López [19], (France) Richard Gasquet [22]
  - Ladies' Singles: (Russia) Anastasia Pavlyuchenkova [16], (Australia) Daria Gavrilova [20], (Netherlands) Kiki Bertens [23], (United States) Lauren Davis [28], (China) Zhang Shuai [30]
- Schedule of play

Matches on main courts
Matches on Centre Court
| Event | Winner | Loser | Score |
|---|---|---|---|
| Ladies' Singles 1st Round | (Germany) Angelique Kerber [1] | (United States) Irina Falconi [Q] | 6–4, 6–4 |
| Gentlemen's Singles 1st Round | (Serbia) Novak Djokovic [2] | (Slovakia) Martin Kližan | 6–3, 2–0, retired |
| Gentlemen's Singles 1st Round | (Switzerland) Roger Federer [3] | (Ukraine) Alexandr Dolgopolov | 6–3, 3–0, retired |
| Ladies' Singles 1st Round | (Denmark) Caroline Wozniacki [5] | (Hungary) Tímea Babos | 6–4, 4–6, 6–1 |
Matches on No. 1 Court
| Event | Winner | Loser | Score |
| Gentlemen's Singles 1st Round | (Canada) Milos Raonic [6] | (Germany) Jan-Lennard Struff | 7–6^{(7–5)}, 6–2, 7–6^{(7–4)} |
| Ladies' Singles 1st Round | (Czech Republic) Karolína Plíšková [3] | (Russia) Evgeniya Rodina | 6–1, 6–4 |
| Gentlemen's Singles 1st Round | (Austria) Dominic Thiem [8] | (Canada) Vasek Pospisil | 6–4, 6–4, 6–3 |
Matches on No. 2 Court
| Event | Winner | Loser | Score |
| Gentlemen's Singles 1st Round | (Argentina) Juan Martín del Potro [29] | (Australia) Thanasi Kokkinakis [PR] | 6–3, 3–6, 7–6^{(7–2)}, 6–4 |
| Ladies' Singles 1st Round | (Poland) Agnieszka Radwańska [9] | (Serbia) Jelena Janković | 7–6^{(7–3)}, 6–0 |
| Gentlemen's Singles 1st Round | (Czech Republic) Tomáš Berdych [11] | (France) Jérémy Chardy | 6–3, 3–6, 7–6^{(7–4)}, 6–4 |
| Ladies' Singles 1st Round | (Russia) Svetlana Kuznetsova [7] | (Tunisia) Ons Jabeur [Q] | 6–3, 6–2 |
Matches on No. 3 Court
| Event | Winner | Loser | Score |
| Gentlemen's Singles 1st Round | (United Kingdom) Kyle Edmund | (United Kingdom) Alexander Ward [Q] | 4–6, 6–3, 6–2, 6–1 |
| Ladies' Singles 1st Round | (Spain) Garbiñe Muguruza [14] | (Russia) Ekaterina Alexandrova | 6–2, 6–4 |
| Gentlemen's Singles 1st Round | (Germany) Alexander Zverev [10] | (Russia) Evgeny Donskoy | 6–4, 7–6^{(7–3)}, 6–3 |
| Ladies' Singles 1st Round | (France) Kristina Mladenovic [12] | (France) Pauline Parmentier | 6–1, 6–3 |

== Day 3 (5 July) ==
- Seeds out:
  - Gentlemen's Singles: (France) Lucas Pouille [14]
  - Ladies' Singles: (Czech Republic) Petra Kvitová [11], (Russia) Elena Vesnina [15], (United States) Madison Keys [17], (Latvia) Anastasija Sevastova [18], (Czech Republic) Barbora Strýcová [22], (Spain) Carla Suárez Navarro [25]
  - Gentlemen's Doubles: (Netherlands) Jean-Julien Rojer / (Romania) Horia Tecău [9], (Spain) Feliciano López / (Spain) Marc López [11]
  - Ladies' Doubles: (Canada) Gabriela Dabrowski / (China) Xu Yifan [10], (Japan) Eri Hozumi / (Japan) Miyu Kato [16]
- Schedule of play

Matches on main courts
Matches on Centre Court
| Event | Winner | Loser | Score |
|---|---|---|---|
| Ladies' Singles 2nd Round | (United Kingdom) Johanna Konta [6] | (Croatia) Donna Vekić | 7–6^{(7–4)}, 4–6, 10–8 |
| Gentlemen's Singles 2nd Round | (United Kingdom) Andy Murray [1] | (Germany) Dustin Brown | 6–3, 6–2, 6–2 |
| Gentlemen's Singles 2nd Round | (Spain) Rafael Nadal [4] | (United States) Donald Young | 6–4, 6–2, 7–5 |
Matches on No. 1 Court
| Event | Winner | Loser | Score |
| Gentlemen's Singles 2nd Round | (Japan) Kei Nishikori [9] | (Ukraine) Sergiy Stakhovsky [Q] | 6–4, 6–7^{(7–9)}, 6–1, 7–6^{(8–6)} |
| Ladies' Singles 2nd Round | (United States) Venus Williams [10] | (China) Wang Qiang | 4–6, 6–4, 6–1 |
| Ladies' Singles 2nd Round | (Romania) Simona Halep [2] | (Brazil) Beatriz Haddad Maia | 7–5, 6–3 |
Matches on No. 2 Court
| Event | Winner | Loser | Score |
| Ladies' Singles 2nd Round | (United Kingdom) Heather Watson [WC] | (Latvia) Anastasija Sevastova [18] | 6–0, 6–4 |
| Gentlemen's Singles 2nd Round | (France) Jo-Wilfried Tsonga [12] | (Italy) Simone Bolelli [Q] | 6–1, 7–5, 6–2 |
| Gentlemen's Singles 2nd Round | (Croatia) Marin Čilić [7] | (Germany) Florian Mayer | 7–6^{(7–2)}, 6–4, 7–5 |
| Ladies' Singles 2nd Round | (United States) Madison Brengle | (Czech Republic) Petra Kvitová [11] | 6–3, 1–6, 6–2 |
Matches on No. 3 Court
| Event | Winner | Loser | Score |
| Ladies' Singles 2nd Round | (Belarus) Victoria Azarenka [PR] | (Russia) Elena Vesnina [15] | 6–3, 6–3 |
| Gentlemen's Singles 2nd Round | (United Kingdom) Aljaž Bedene | (Bosnia and Herzegovina) Damir Džumhur | 6–3, 3–6, 6–3, 6–3 |
| Gentlemen's Singles 2nd Round | (Poland) Jerzy Janowicz [PR] | (France) Lucas Pouille [14] | 7–6^{(7–4)}, 7–6^{(7–5)}, 3–6, 6–1 |
| Ladies' Singles 2nd Round | (Italy) Camila Giorgi | (United States) Madison Keys [17] | 6–4, 6–7^{(10–12)}, 6–1 |

== Day 4 (6 July) ==
- Seeds out:
  - Gentlemen's Singles: (United States) Jack Sock [17], (United States) John Isner [23], (Argentina) Juan Martín del Potro [29], (Italy) Paolo Lorenzi [32]
  - Ladies' Singles: (Czech Republic) Karolína Plíšková [3], (France) Kristina Mladenovic [12], (Russia) Daria Kasatkina [29], (Czech Republic) Lucie Šafářová [32]
  - Ladies' Doubles: (United States) Abigail Spears / (Slovenia) Katarina Srebotnik [6], (United States) Raquel Atawo / (Latvia) Jeļena Ostapenko [11], (Netherlands) Kiki Bertens / (Sweden) Johanna Larsson [14]
- Schedule of play

Matches on main courts
Matches on Centre Court
| Event | Winner | Loser | Score |
|---|---|---|---|
| Gentlemen's Singles 2nd Round | (France) Gaël Monfils [15] | (United Kingdom) Kyle Edmund | 7–6^{(7–1)}, 6–4, 6–4 |
| Ladies' Singles 2nd Round | (Slovakia) Magdaléna Rybáriková [PR] | (Czech Republic) Karolína Plíšková [3] | 3–6, 7–5, 6–2 |
| Gentlemen's Singles 2nd Round | (Switzerland) Roger Federer [3] | (Serbia) Dušan Lajović | 7–6^{(7–0)}, 6–3, 6–2 |
Matches on No. 1 Court
| Event | Winner | Loser | Score |
| Gentlemen's Singles 2nd Round | (Serbia) Novak Djokovic [2] | (Czech Republic) Adam Pavlásek | 6–2, 6–2, 6–1 |
| Gentlemen's Singles 2nd Round | (Austria) Dominic Thiem [8] | (France) Gilles Simon | 5–7, 6–4, 6–2, 6–4 |
| Ladies' Singles 2nd Round | (Germany) Angelique Kerber [1] | (Belgium) Kirsten Flipkens | 7–5, 7–5 |
Matches on No. 2 Court
| Event | Winner | Loser | Score |
| Gentlemen's Singles 2nd Round | (Bulgaria) Grigor Dimitrov [13] | (Cyprus) Marcos Baghdatis | 6–3, 6–2, 6–1 |
| Ladies' Singles 2nd Round | (Poland) Agnieszka Radwańska [9] | (United States) Christina McHale | 5–7, 7–6^{(9–7)}, 6–3 |
| Gentlemen's Singles 2nd Round | (Canada) Milos Raonic [6] | (Russia) Mikhail Youzhny | 3–6, 7–6^{(9–7)}, 6–4, 7–5 |
| Ladies' Singles 2nd Round | (Denmark) Caroline Wozniacki [5] | (Bulgaria) Tsvetana Pironkova | 6–3, 6–4 |
Matches on No. 3 Court
| Event | Winner | Loser | Score |
| Ladies' Singles 2nd Round | (Russia) Svetlana Kuznetsova [7] | (Russia) Ekaterina Makarova | 6–0, 7–5 |
| Gentlemen's Singles 2nd Round | (Latvia) Ernests Gulbis [PR] | (Argentina) Juan Martín del Potro [29] | 6–4, 6–4, 7–6^{(7–3)} |
| Ladies' Singles 2nd Round | (Spain) Garbiñe Muguruza [14] | (Belgium) Yanina Wickmayer | 6–2, 6–4 |
| Gentlemen's Singles 2nd Round | (Germany) Alexander Zverev [10] | (United States) Frances Tiafoe | 6–3, 6–4, 6–3 |

== Day 5 (7 July) ==
- Seeds out:
  - Gentlemen's Singles: (Japan) Kei Nishikori [9], (United States) Steve Johnson [26], (Italy) Fabio Fognini [28], (Russia) Karen Khachanov [30]
  - Ladies' Singles: (Slovakia) Dominika Cibulková [8]
  - Gentlemen's Doubles: (United Kingdom) Jamie Murray / (Brazil) Bruno Soares [3], (India) Rohan Bopanna / (France) Édouard Roger-Vasselin [8], (Colombia) Juan Sebastián Cabal / (Colombia) Robert Farah [12], (France) Fabrice Martin / (Canada) Daniel Nestor [13], (Chile) Julio Peralta / (Argentina) Horacio Zeballos [15]
  - Ladies' Doubles: (United States) Bethanie Mattek-Sands / (Czech Republic) Lucie Šafářová [1] (withdrew due to Mattek-Sands' knee injury)
- Schedule of play

Matches on main courts
Matches on Centre Court
| Event | Winner | Loser | Score |
|---|---|---|---|
| Ladies' Singles 3rd Round | (Belarus) Victoria Azarenka [PR] | (United Kingdom) Heather Watson [WC] | 3–6, 6–1, 6–4 |
| Gentlemen's Singles 3rd Round | (Spain) Rafael Nadal [4] | (Russia) Karen Khachanov [30] | 6–1, 6–4, 7–6^{(7–3)} |
| Gentlemen's Singles 3rd Round | (United Kingdom) Andy Murray [1] | (Italy) Fabio Fognini [28] | 6–2, 4–6, 6–1, 7–5 |
Matches on No. 1 Court
| Event | Winner | Loser | Score |
| Gentlemen's Singles 3rd Round | (Croatia) Marin Čilić [7] | (United States) Steve Johnson [26] | 6–4, 7–6^{(7–3)}, 6–4 |
| Ladies' Singles 3rd Round | (United Kingdom) Johanna Konta [6] | (Greece) Maria Sakkari | 6–4, 6–1 |
| Ladies' Singles 3rd Round | (United States) Venus Williams [10] | (Japan) Naomi Osaka | 7–6^{(7–3)}, 6–4 |
| Mixed Doubles 1st Round | (United States) Nicole Melichar (Germany) Andre Begemann | (United Kingdom) Laura Robson [WC] (United Kingdom) Dominic Inglot [WC] | 6–3, 6–4 |
Matches on No. 2 Court
| Event | Winner | Loser | Score |
| Gentlemen's Singles 3rd Round | (Luxembourg) Gilles Müller [16] | (United Kingdom) Aljaž Bedene | 7–6^{(7–4)}, 7–5, 6–4 |
| Ladies' Singles 3rd Round | (Romania) Simona Halep [2] | (China) Peng Shuai | 6–4, 7–6^{(9–7)} |
| Ladies' Singles 3rd Round | (Latvia) Jeļena Ostapenko [13] | (Italy) Camila Giorgi | 7–5, 7–5 |
| Gentlemen's Singles 3rd Round | (France) Jo-Wilfried Tsonga [12] vs. (United States) Sam Querrey [24] | | 2–6, 6–3, 6–7^{(5–7)}, 6–1, 5–6, suspended |
Matches on No. 3 Court
| Event | Winner | Loser | Score |
| Gentlemen's Singles 3rd Round | (Spain) Roberto Bautista Agut [18] | (Japan) Kei Nishikori [9] | 6–4, 7–6^{(7–3)}, 3–6, 6–3 |
| Ladies' Singles 3rd Round | (Ukraine) Elina Svitolina [4] | (Germany) Carina Witthöft | 6–1, 7–5 |
| Ladies' Doubles 2nd Round | (Chinese Taipei) Chan Yung-jan (Switzerland) Martina Hingis [3] | (Russia) Natela Dzalamidze (Russia) Veronika Kudermetova | 6–1, 6–3 |
| Gentlemen's Singles 3rd Round | (South Africa) Kevin Anderson | (Belgium) Ruben Bemelmans [Q] | 7–6^{(7–3)}, 6–4, 7–6^{(7–3)} |

== Day 6 (8 July) ==
- Seeds out:
  - Gentlemen's Singles: (France) Jo-Wilfried Tsonga [12], (France) Gaël Monfils [15], (Spain) Albert Ramos Viñolas [25], (Germany) Mischa Zverev [27]
  - Ladies' Singles: (Switzerland) Timea Bacsinszky [19]
  - Gentlemen's Doubles: (France) Pierre-Hugues Herbert / (France) Nicolas Mahut [2], (United States) Bob Bryan / (United States) Mike Bryan [5]
  - Mixed Doubles: (France) Édouard Roger-Vasselin / (Czech Republic) Andrea Hlaváčková [5], (United States) Rajeev Ram / (Australia) Casey Dellacqua [6], (Netherlands) Jean-Julien Rojer / (Chinese Taipei) Chan Hao-ching [8], (Pakistan) Aisam-ul-Haq Qureshi / (Germany) Anna-Lena Grönefeld [13], (Poland) Marcin Matkowski / (Czech Republic) Květa Peschke [14]
- Schedule of play

Matches on main courts
Matches on Centre Court
| Event | Winner | Loser | Score |
|---|---|---|---|
| Ladies' Singles 3rd Round | (Poland) Agnieszka Radwańska [9] | (Switzerland) Timea Bacsinszky [19] | 3–6, 6–4, 6–1 |
| Gentlemen's Singles 3rd Round | (Serbia) Novak Djokovic [2] | (Latvia) Ernests Gulbis [PR] | 6–4, 6–1, 7–6^{(7–2)} |
| Gentlemen's Singles 3rd Round | (Switzerland) Roger Federer [3] | (Germany) Mischa Zverev [27] | 7–6^{(7–3)}, 6–4, 6–4 |
Matches on No. 1 Court
| Event | Winner | Loser | Score |
| Gentlemen's Singles 3rd Round | (Canada) Milos Raonic [5] | (Spain) Albert Ramos Viñolas [25] | 7–6^{(7–3)}, 6–4, 7–5 |
| Ladies' Singles 3rd Round | (Denmark) Caroline Wozniacki [5] | (Estonia) Anett Kontaveit | 3–6, 7–6^{(7–3)}, 6–2 |
| Gentlemen's Singles 3rd Round | (Austria) Dominic Thiem [8] | (United States) Jared Donaldson | 7–5, 6–4, 6–2 |
Matches on No. 2 Court
| Event | Winner | Loser | Score |
| Ladies' Singles 3rd Round | (Spain) Garbiñe Muguruza [14] | (Romania) Sorana Cîrstea | 6–2, 6–2 |
| Gentlemen's Singles 3rd Round | (United States) Sam Querrey [24] | (France) Jo-Wilfried Tsonga [12] | 6–2, 3–6, 7–6^{(7–5)}, 1–6, 7–5 |
| Ladies' Singles 3rd Round | (Germany) Angelique Kerber [1] | (United States) Shelby Rogers | 4–6, 7–6^{(7–2)}, 6–4 |
| Gentlemen's Singles 3rd Round | (Germany) Alexander Zverev [10] | (Austria) Sebastian Ofner [Q] | 6–4, 6–4, 6–2 |
| Mixed Doubles 2nd Round | (United Kingdom) Jamie Murray [1] (Switzerland) Martina Hingis [1] | (United Kingdom) Neal Skupski [WC] (United Kingdom) Anna Smith [WC] | 6–3, 6–0 |
Matches on No. 3 Court
| Event | Winner | Loser | Score |
| Gentlemen's Singles 3rd Round | (Bulgaria) Grigor Dimitrov [13] | (Israel) Dudi Sela | 6–1, 6–1, retired |
| Ladies' Singles 3rd Round | (United States) Coco Vandeweghe [24] | (United States) Alison Riske | 6–2, 6–4 |
| Gentlemen's Singles 3rd Round | (Czech Republic) Tomáš Berdych [11] | (Spain) David Ferrer | 6–3, 6–4, 6–3 |
| Gentlemen's Doubles 2nd Round | (United Kingdom) Jay Clarke [WC] (United Kingdom) Marcus Willis [WC] | (France) Pierre-Hugues Herbert [2] (France) Nicolas Mahut [2] | 3–6, 6–1, 7–6^{(7–3)}, 5–7, 6–3 |

== Middle Sunday (9 July) ==
Following tradition, Middle Sunday is a day of rest and no matches are played.

== Day 7 (10 July) ==
- Seeds out:
  - Gentlemen's Singles: (Spain) Rafael Nadal [4], (Austria) Dominic Thiem [8], (Germany) Alexander Zverev [10], (Bulgaria) Grigor Dimitrov [13], (Spain) Roberto Bautista Agut [18]
  - Ladies' Singles: (Germany) Angelique Kerber [1], (Ukraine) Elina Svitolina [4], (Denmark) Caroline Wozniacki [5], (Poland) Agnieszka Radwańska [9], (France) Caroline Garcia [21], (Croatia) Ana Konjuh [27]
  - Gentlemen's Doubles: (Croatia) Ivan Dodig / (Spain) Marcel Granollers [6], (South Africa) Raven Klaasen / (United States) Rajeev Ram [7], (Romania) Florin Mergea / (Pakistan) Aisam-ul-Haq Qureshi [14]
  - Ladies' Doubles: (Hungary) Tímea Babos / (Czech Republic) Andrea Hlaváčková [4], (Czech Republic) Lucie Hradecká / (Czech Republic) Kateřina Siniaková [5], (Germany) Julia Görges / (Czech Republic) Barbora Strýcová [7], (Belgium) Kirsten Flipkens / (India) Sania Mirza [13], (Slovenia) Andreja Klepač / (Spain) María José Martínez Sánchez [15]
  - Mixed Doubles: (Poland) Łukasz Kubot / (Chinese Taipei) Chan Yung-jan [3], (South Africa) Raven Klaasen / (Slovenia) Katarina Srebotnik [7]
- Schedule of play

Matches on main courts
Matches on Centre Court
| Event | Winner | Loser | Score |
|---|---|---|---|
| Ladies' Singles 4th Round | (United States) Venus Williams [10] | (Croatia) Ana Konjuh [27] | 6–3, 6–2 |
| Gentlemen's Singles 4th Round | (United Kingdom) Andy Murray [1] | (France) Benoît Paire | 7–6^{(7–1)}, 6–4, 6–4 |
| Gentlemen's Singles 4th Round | (Switzerland) Roger Federer [3] | (Bulgaria) Grigor Dimitrov [13] | 6–4, 6–2, 6–4 |
Matches on No. 1 Court
| Event | Winner | Loser | Score |
| Ladies' Singles 4th Round | (United Kingdom) Johanna Konta [6] | (France) Caroline Garcia [21] | 7–6^{(7–3)}, 4–6, 6–4 |
| Gentlemen's Singles 4th Round | (Luxembourg) Gilles Müller [16] | (Spain) Rafael Nadal [4] | 6–3, 6–4, 3–6, 4–6, 15–13 |
Matches on No. 2 Court
| Event | Winner | Loser | Score |
| Ladies' Singles 4th Round | (Spain) Garbiñe Muguruza [14] | (Germany) Angelique Kerber [1] | 4–6, 6–4, 6–4 |
| Ladies' Singles 4th Round | (Romania) Simona Halep [2] | (Belarus) Victoria Azarenka [PR] | 7–6^{(7–3)}, 6–2 |
| Gentlemen's Singles 4th Round | (Canada) Milos Raonic [5] | (Germany) Alexander Zverev [10] | 4–6, 7–5, 4–6, 7–5, 6–1 |
Matches on No. 3 Court
| Event | Winner | Loser | Score |
| Ladies' Singles 4th Round | (Russia) Svetlana Kuznetsova [7] | (Poland) Agnieszka Radwańska [9] | 6–2, 6–4 |
| Ladies' Singles 4th Round | (United States) Coco Vandeweghe [24] | (Denmark) Caroline Wozniacki [5] | 7–6^{(7–4)}, 6–4 |
| Gentlemen's Singles 4th Round | (Czech Republic) Tomáš Berdych [11] | (Austria) Dominic Thiem [8] | 6–3, 6–7^{(1–7)}, 6–3, 3–6, 6–3 |
| Gentlemen's Doubles 3rd Round | (New Zealand) Marcus Daniell / (Brazil) Marcelo Demoliner vs. (United Kingdom) Ken Skupski / (United Kingdom) Neal Skupski [WC] | | 6–7^{(3–7)}, 7–5, 6–7^{(7–9)}, suspended |

== Day 8 (11 July) ==
- Seeds out:
  - Ladies' Singles: (Romania) Simona Halep [2], (Russia) Svetlana Kuznetsova [7], (Latvia) Jeļena Ostapenko [13], (United States) Coco Vandeweghe [24]
  - Mixed Doubles: (Czech Republic) Roman Jebavý / (Czech Republic) Lucie Hradecká [16]
- Schedule of play

Matches on main courts
Matches on Centre Court
| Event | Winner | Loser | Score |
|---|---|---|---|
| Gentlemen's Singles 4th Round | (Serbia) Novak Djokovic [2] | (France) Adrian Mannarino | 6–2, 7–6^{(7–5)}, 6–4 |
| Ladies' Singles Quarterfinals | (United States) Venus Williams [10] | (Latvia) Jeļena Ostapenko [13] | 6–3, 7–5 |
| Ladies' Singles Quarterfinals | (United Kingdom) Johanna Konta [6] | (Romania) Simona Halep [2] | 6–7^{(2–7)}, 7–6^{(7–5)},6–4 |
| Ladies' Singles Quarterfinals | (Slovakia) Magdaléna Rybáriková [PR] | (United States) Coco Vandeweghe [24] | 6–3, 6–3 (Note: This match started on No. 1 Court, as planned, but with the match even at two games all in the second set, the match was suspended due to rain. The match moved to Centre Court following the conclusion of the Konta-Halep match, where it was finished the same day.) |
Matches on No. 1 Court
| Event | Winner | Loser | Score |
| Ladies' Singles Quarterfinals | (Spain) Garbiñe Muguruza [14] | (Russia) Svetlana Kuznetsova [7] | 6–3, 6–4 |
Matches on No. 2 Court
| Event | Winner | Loser | Score |
| Mixed Doubles 3rd Round | (United Kingdom) Jamie Murray [1] (Switzerland) Martina Hingis [1] | (Czech Republic) Roman Jebavý [16] (Czech Republic) Lucie Hradecká [16] | 6–3, 6–4 |
| Gentlemen's Doubles Quarterfinals | (Finland) Henri Kontinen / (Australia) John Peers [1] vs. (United States) Ryan Harrison / (New Zealand) Michael Venus [10] | | 6–4, 6–7^{(5–7)}, 4–3, suspended |
Matches on No. 3 Court
| Event | Winner | Loser | Score |
| Gentlemen's Doubles 3rd Round | (United Kingdom) Ken Skupski [WC] (United Kingdom) Neal Skupski [WC] | (New Zealand) Marcus Daniell (Brazil) Marcelo Demoliner | 7–6^{(7–3)}, 5–7, 7–6^{(9–7)}, 6–4 |
| Gentlemen's Doubles Quarterfinals | (Chile) Hans Podlipnik-Castillo / (Belarus) Andrei Vasilevski vs. (Croatia) Nikola Mektić / (Croatia) Franko Škugor | | 7–6^{(10–8)}, 4–6, 1–1, suspended |

== Day 9 (12 July) ==
- Seeds out:
  - Gentlemen's Singles: (United Kingdom) Andy Murray [1], (Serbia) Novak Djokovic [2], (Canada) Milos Raonic [6], (Luxembourg) Gilles Müller [16]
  - Gentlemen's Doubles: (United States) Ryan Harrison / (New Zealand) Michael Venus [10]
  - Ladies' Doubles: (Chinese Taipei) Chan Yung-jan [3] / (Switzerland) Martina Hingis [3], (Australia) Ashleigh Barty / (Australia) Casey Dellacqua [8]
  - Mixed Doubles: (Croatia) Ivan Dodig / (India) Sania Mirza [4], (Colombia) Juan Sebastián Cabal / (United States) Abigail Spears [9]. (Canada) Daniel Nestor / (Slovenia) Andreja Klepač [11], (Belarus) Max Mirnyi / (Russia) Ekaterina Makarova [12], (New Zealand) Michael Venus / (Czech Republic) Barbora Krejčíková [15]
- Schedule of play

Matches on main courts
Matches on Centre Court
| Event | Winner | Loser | Score |
|---|---|---|---|
| Gentlemen's Singles Quarterfinals | (United States) Sam Querrey [24] | (United Kingdom) Andy Murray [1] | 3–6, 6–4, 6–7^{(4–7)}, 6–1, 6–1 |
| Gentlemen's Singles Quarterfinals | (Switzerland) Roger Federer [3] | (Canada) Milos Raonic [6] | 6–4, 6–2, 7–6^{(7–4)} |
| Ladies' Doubles Quarterfinals | (Germany) Anna-Lena Grönefeld [12] (Czech Republic) Květa Peschke [12] | (Chinese Taipei) Chan Yung-jan [3] (Switzerland) Martina Hingis [3] | 6–4, 3–6, 6–4 |
Matches on No. 1 Court
| Event | Winner | Loser | Score |
| Gentlemen's Singles Quarterfinals | (Croatia) Marin Čilić [7] | (Luxembourg) Gilles Müller [16] | 3–6, 7–6^{(8–6)}, 7–5, 5–7, 6–1 |
| Gentlemen's Singles Quarterfinals | (Czech Republic) Tomáš Berdych [11] | (Serbia) Novak Djokovic [2] | 7–6^{(7–2)}, 2–0, retired |
| Mixed Doubles 3rd Round | (United Kingdom) Ken Skupski [WC] (United Kingdom) Jocelyn Rae [WC] | (Belarus) Max Mirnyi [12] (Russia) Ekaterina Makarova [12] | 5–7, 6–4, 9–7 |
Matches on No. 2 Court
| Event | Winner | Loser | Score |
| Gentlemen's Doubles Quarterfinals | (Finland) Henri Kontinen [1] (Australia) John Peers [1] | (United States) Ryan Harrison [10] (New Zealand) Michael Venus [10] | 6–4, 6–7^{(5–7)}, 6–7^{(4–7)}, 7–6^{(9–7)}, 6–1 |
| Ladies' Doubles Quarterfinals | (Russia) Ekaterina Makarova [2] (Russia) Elena Vesnina [2] | (Australia) Ashleigh Barty [8] (Australia) Casey Dellacqua [8] | 6–4, 4–6, 6–4 |
| Mixed Doubles 3rd Round | (Brazil) Marcelo Demoliner (Spain) María José Martínez Sánchez | (Australia) John Peers (Germany) Sabine Lisicki | 6–4, 3–6, 7–5 |
| Mixed Doubles 3rd Round | (Finland) Henri Kontinen (United Kingdom) Heather Watson | (Croatia) Ivan Dodig [4] (India) Sania Mirza [4] | 7–6^{(7–4)}, 6–4 |
Matches on No. 3 Court
| Event | Winner | Loser | Score |
| Gentlemen's Doubles Quarterfinals | (Croatia) Nikola Mektić (Croatia) Franko Škugor | (Chile) Hans Podlipnik-Castillo (Belarus) Andrei Vasilevski | 6–7^{(8–10)}, 6–4, 7–6^{(7–5)}, 7–5 |
| Ladies' Doubles Quarterfinals | (Chinese Taipei) Chan Hao-ching [9] (Romania) Monica Niculescu [9] | (United States) Catherine Bellis (Czech Republic) Markéta Vondroušová | 6–3, 6–4 |
| Mixed Doubles 3rd Round | (Croatia) Mate Pavić (Ukraine) Lyudmyla Kichenok | (Colombia) Juan Sebastián Cabal [9] (United States) Abigail Spears [9] | 7–6^{(7–5)}, 5–7, 6–3 |
| Mixed Doubles 3rd Round | (Brazil) Bruno Soares [2] (Russia) Elena Vesnina [2] | (New Zealand) Michael Venus [15] (Czech Republic) Barbora Krejčíková [15] | 6–7^{(4–7)}, 6–4, 6–2 |
| Gentlemen's Invitation Doubles Round Robin | (Croatia) Mario Ančić (United Kingdom) Jamie Delgado | (Sweden) Thomas Enqvist (Sweden) Thomas Johansson | 7–5, 4–6, [13–11] |

== Day 10 (13 July) ==
- Seeds out:
  - Ladies' Singles: (United Kingdom) Johanna Konta [6]
  - Gentlemen's Doubles: (Finland) Henri Kontinen / (Australia) John Peers [1]
  - Mixed Doubles: (India) Rohan Bopanna / (Canada) Gabriela Dabrowski [10]
- Schedule of play

Matches on main courts
Matches on Centre Court
| Event | Winner | Loser | Score |
|---|---|---|---|
| Ladies' Singles Semifinals | (Spain) Garbiñe Muguruza [14] | (Slovakia) Magdaléna Rybáriková [PR] | 6–1, 6–1 |
| Ladies' Singles Semifinals | (United States) Venus Williams [10] | (United Kingdom) Johanna Konta [6] | 6–4, 6–2 |
| Mixed Doubles Quarterfinals | (United Kingdom) Jamie Murray [1] (Switzerland) Martina Hingis [1] | (United Kingdom) Ken Skupski [WC] (United Kingdom) Jocelyn Rae [WC] | 6–4, 6–4 |
| Mixed Doubles Quarterfinals | (Finland) Henri Kontinen (United Kingdom) Heather Watson | (India) Rohan Bopanna [10] (Canada) Gabriela Dabrowski [10] | 6–7^{(4–7)}, 6–4, 7–5 |
Matches on No. 1 Court
| Event | Winner | Loser | Score |
| Gentlemen's Doubles Semifinals | (Poland) Łukasz Kubot [4] (Brazil) Marcelo Melo [4] | (Finland) Henri Kontinen [1] (Australia) John Peers [1] | 6–3, 6–7^{(4–7)}, 6–2, 4–6, 9–7 |
| Mixed Doubles Quarterfinals | (Brazil) Bruno Soares [2] (Russia) Elena Vesnina [2] | (Germany) Andre Begemann (United States) Nicole Melichar | 7–5, 6–4 |
| Ladies' Invitation Doubles Round Robin | (Zimbabwe) Cara Black (United States) Martina Navratilova | (United States) Andrea Jaeger (Spain) Conchita Martínez | 6–3, 6–1 |
Matches on No. 2 Court
| Event | Winner | Loser | Score |
| Gentlemen's Invitation Doubles Round Robin | (Australia) Lleyton Hewitt (Australia) Mark Philippoussis | (United Kingdom) Jamie Baker (United Kingdom) Colin Fleming | 4–6, 6–2, [10–6] |
| Gentlemen's Doubles Semifinals | (Austria) Oliver Marach [16] (Croatia) Mate Pavić [16] | (Croatia) Nikola Mektić (Croatia) Franko Škugor | 4–6, 7–5, 7–6^{(7–4)}, 3–6, 17–15 |
| Senior Gentlemen's Invitation Doubles Round Robin | (Netherlands) Jacco Eltingh (Netherlands) Paul Haarhuis | (United Kingdom) Andrew Castle (United States) Michael Chang | 6–4, 6–4 |
| Mixed Doubles Quarterfinals | (Brazil) Marcelo Demoliner (Spain) María José Martínez Sánchez | (Croatia) Mate Pavić (Ukraine) Lyudmyla Kichenok | 6–3, 2–6, 6–3 |
Matches on No. 3 Court
| Event | Winner | Loser | Score |
| Senior Gentlemen's Invitation Doubles Round Robin | (France) Henri Leconte (France) Cédric Pioline | (United States) Patrick McEnroe (United States) Jeff Tarango | 6–7^{(3–7)}, 6–2, [12–10] |
| Senior Gentlemen's Invitation Doubles Round Robin | (United Kingdom) Jeremy Bates (United Kingdom) Chris Wilkinson | (South Africa) Wayne Ferreira (Croatia) Goran Ivanišević | 4–6, 6–2, [12–10] |
| Gentlemen's Invitation Doubles Round Robin | (United Kingdom) Greg Rusedski (France) Fabrice Santoro | (Iran) Mansour Bahrami (France) Michaël Llodra | 6–4, 3–6, [10–7] |
| Gentlemen's Invitation Doubles Round Robin | (United States) Justin Gimelstob (United Kingdom) Ross Hutchins | (Croatia) Mario Ančić (United Kingdom) Jamie Delgado | 6–2, 7–5 |
| Senior Gentlemen's Invitation Doubles Round Robin | (Netherlands) Richard Krajicek (United Kingdom) Mark Petchey | (Australia) Todd Woodbridge (Australia) Mark Woodforde | 6–1, 6–7^{(6–8)}, [10–7] |

== Day 11 (14 July) ==
- Seeds out:
  - Gentlemen's Singles: (Czech Republic) Tomáš Berdych [11], (United States) Sam Querrey [24]
  - Ladies' Doubles: (Germany) Anna-Lena Grönefeld / (Czech Republic) Květa Peschke [12]
  - Mixed Doubles: (Brazil) Bruno Soares [2] / (Russia) Elena Vesnina [2]
- Schedule of play

Matches on main courts
Matches on Centre Court
| Event | Winner | Loser | Score |
|---|---|---|---|
| Gentlemen's Singles Semifinals | (Croatia) Marin Čilić [7] | (United States) Sam Querrey [24] | 6–7^{(6–8)}, 6–4, 7–6^{(7–3)}, 7–5 |
| Gentlemen's Singles Semifinals | (Switzerland) Roger Federer [3] | (Czech Republic) Tomáš Berdych [11] | 7–6^{(7–4)}, 7–6^{(7–4)}, 6–4 |
| Mixed Doubles Semifinals | (United Kingdom) Jamie Murray [1] (Switzerland) Martina Hingis [1] | (Brazil) Marcelo Demoliner (Spain) María José Martínez Sánchez | 6–2, 7–5 |
Matches on No. 1 Court
| Event | Winner | Loser | Score |
| Ladies' Doubles Semifinals | (Russia) Ekaterina Makarova [2] (Russia) Elena Vesnina [2] | (Germany) Anna-Lena Grönefeld [12] (Czech Republic) Květa Peschke [12] | 7–5, 6–2 |
| Ladies' Doubles Semifinals | (Chinese Taipei) Chan Hao-ching [9] (Romania) Monica Niculescu [9] | (Japan) Makoto Ninomiya (Czech Republic) Renata Voráčová | 7–6^{(7–4)}, 4–6, 9–7 |
| Mixed Doubles Semifinals | (Finland) Henri Kontinen (United Kingdom) Heather Watson | (Brazil) Bruno Soares [2] (Russia) Elena Vesnina [2] | 6–4, 6–7^{(6–8)}, 6–3 |
Matches on No. 2 Court
| Event | Winner | Loser | Score |
| Ladies' Invitation Doubles Round Robin | (Bulgaria) Magdalena Maleeva (Austria) Barbara Schett | (France) Marion Bartoli (Croatia) Iva Majoli | 6–1, 6–2 |
Matches on No. 3 Court
| Event | Winner | Loser | Score |
| Senior Gentlemen's Invitation Doubles Round Robin | (Netherlands) Richard Krajicek (United Kingdom) Mark Petchey | (South Africa) Wayne Ferreira (Croatia) Goran Ivanišević | 6–3, 4–6, [10–4] |
| Ladies' Invitation Doubles Round Robin | (Spain) Arantxa Sánchez Vicario (Tunisia) Selima Sfar | (United States) Lindsay Davenport (United States) Mary Joe Fernández | 4–6, 6–4, [10–3] |
| Ladies' Invitation Doubles Round Robin | (Belgium) Kim Clijsters (Australia) Rennae Stubbs | (United States) Andrea Jaeger (Spain) Conchita Martínez | 6–2, 7–5 |
| Ladies' Invitation Doubles Round Robin | (Zimbabwe) Cara Black (United States) Martina Navratilova | (United States) Tracy Austin (Czech Republic) Helena Suková | 6–3, 6–4 |
| Gentlemen's Invitation Doubles Round Robin | (Sweden) Thomas Enqvist (Sweden) Thomas Johansson | (United States) Justin Gimelstob (United Kingdom) Ross Hutchins | 6–4, 6–3 |

== Day 12 (15 July) ==
- Seeds out:
  - Ladies' Singles: (United States) Venus Williams [10]
  - Gentlemen's' Doubles: (Austria) Oliver Marach / (Croatia) Mate Pavić [16]
  - Ladies' Doubles: (Chinese Taipei) Chan Hao-ching / (Romania) Monica Niculescu [9]
- Schedule of play

Matches on main courts
Matches on Centre Court
| Event | Winner | Loser | Score |
|---|---|---|---|
| Ladies' Singles Final | (Spain) Garbiñe Muguruza [14] | (United States) Venus Williams [10] | 7–5, 6–0 |
| Gentlemen's Doubles Final | (Poland) Łukasz Kubot [4] (Brazil) Marcelo Melo [4] | (Austria) Oliver Marach [16] (Croatia) Mate Pavić [16] | 5–7, 7–5, 7–6^{(7–2)}, 3–6, 13–11 |
| Ladies' Doubles Final | (Russia) Ekaterina Makarova [2] (Russia) Elena Vesnina [2] | (Chinese Taipei) Chan Hao-ching [9] (Romania) Monica Niculescu [9] | 6–0, 6–0 |
Matches on No. 1 Court
| Event | Winner | Loser | Score |
| Girls' Singles Final | (United States) Claire Liu | (United States) Ann Li [3] | 6–2, 5–7, 6–2 |
| Senior Gentlemen's Invitation Doubles Round Robin | (Netherlands) Jacco Eltingh (Netherlands) Paul Haarhuis | (France) Henri Leconte (France) Cédric Pioline | 6–3, 6–4 |
| Boys' Doubles Semifinals | (Austria) Jurij Rodionov (Czech Republic) Michael Vrbenský | (United States) Sebastian Korda (Colombia) Nicolás Mejía | 6–3, 6–4 |
Matches on No. 2 Court
| Event | Winner | Loser | Score |
| Senior Gentlemen's Invitation Doubles Round Robin | (United Kingdom) Andrew Castle (United States) Michael Chang | (United States) Patrick McEnroe (United States) Jeff Tarango | 7–5, 6–3 |
Matches on No. 3 Court
| Event | Winner | Loser | Score |
| Gentlemen's Wheelchair Doubles Semifinals | (United Kingdom) Alfie Hewett [2] (United Kingdom) Gordon Reid [2] | (France) Stéphane Houdet [1] (France) Nicolas Peifer [1] | 6–7^{(5–7)}, 7–5, 7–6^{(7–3)} |
| Ladies' Wheelchair Singles Final | (Netherlands) Diede de Groot | (Germany) Sabine Ellerbrock | 6–4, 6–0 |
| Senior Gentlemen's Invitation Doubles Round Robin | (Australia) Todd Woodbridge (Australia) Mark Woodforde | (United Kingdom) Jeremy Bates (United Kingdom) Chris Wilkinson | 7–5, 7–6^{(7–1)} |

== Day 13 (16 July) ==
- Seeds out:
  - Gentlemen's Singles: (Croatia) Marin Čilić [7]
- Schedule of play

Matches on main courts
Matches on Centre Court
| Event | Winner | Loser | Score |
|---|---|---|---|
| Gentlemen's Singles Final | (Switzerland) Roger Federer [3] | (Croatia) Marin Čilić [7] | 6–3, 6–1, 6–4 |
| Mixed Doubles Final | (United Kingdom) Jamie Murray [1] (Switzerland) Martina Hingis [1] | (Finland) Henri Kontinen (United Kingdom) Heather Watson | 6–4, 6–4 |
Matches on No. 1 Court
| Event | Winner | Loser | Score |
| Boys' Singles Final | (Spain) Alejandro Davidovich Fokina [8] | (Argentina) Axel Geller | 7–6^{(7–2)}, 6–3 |
| Ladies' Invitation Doubles Final | (Zimbabwe) Cara Black (United States) Martina Navratilova | (Spain) Arantxa Sánchez Vicario (Tunisia) Selima Sfar | 6–2, 4–6, [10–4] |
| Gentlemen's Invitation Doubles Final | (Australia) Lleyton Hewitt (Australia) Mark Philippoussis | (United States) Justin Gimelstob (United Kingdom) Ross Hutchins | 6–3, 6–3 |
Matches on No. 3 Court
| Event | Winner | Loser | Score |
| Ladies' Wheelchair Doubles Final | (Japan) Yui Kamiji (United Kingdom) Jordanne Whiley | (Netherlands) Marjolein Buis [2] (Netherlands) Diede de Groot [2] | 2–6, 6–3, 6–0 |
| Gentlemen's Wheelchair Singles Final | (Sweden) Stefan Olsson | (Argentina) Gustavo Fernández | 7–5, 3–6, 7–5 |
