= 2017 Wimbledon Championships – Girls' doubles =

Girls' doubles
- 2017 Wimbledon Championships

Final
- Champions: (Serbia) Olga Danilović (Slovenia) Kaja Juvan
- Runners-up: (United States) Caty McNally (United States) Whitney Osuigwe
- Score: 6–4, 6–3

Events
Singles	men	women		boys	girls
Doubles	men	women	mixed	boys	girls
WC Singles	men	women	quad
WC Doubles	men	women	quad
Legends	men	women	seniors
← 2016 ·	Wimbledon Championships	· 2018 →

Olga Danilović and Kaja Juvan won the title, defeating Caty McNally and Whitney Osuigwe in the final, 6–4, 6–3.

Usue Maitane Arconada and Claire Liu were the defending champions, however Arconada was no longer eligible to participate in junior events. Liu partnered Taylor Johnson, but lost in the quarterfinals to María José Portillo Ramírez and Sofia Sewing.

== Seeds ==
1. (Canada) Carson Branstine / (Ukraine) Marta Kostyuk (semifinals)
2. (United States) Taylor Johnson / (United States) Claire Liu (quarterfinals)
3. (United States) Kayla Day / (United Kingdom) Katie Swan (second round)
4. (United States) Caty McNally / (United States) Whitney Osuigwe (final)
5. (China) Wang Xinyu / (China) Wang Xiyu (second round)
6. (Japan) Mai Hontama / (Japan) Yuki Naito (second round)
7. (Russia) Amina Anshba / (Russia) Elena Rybakina (second round)
8. (Colombia) Emiliana Arango / (United States) Ellie Douglas (quarterfinals)

== Draw ==
=== Key ===
- Q = Qualifier
- WC = Wild card
- LL = Lucky loser
- Alt = Alternate
- SE = Special exempt
- PR = Protected ranking
- ITF = ITF entry
- JE = Junior exempt
- w/o = Walkover
- r = Retired
- d = Defaulted
- SR = Special ranking

=== Finals ===
Semifinals
1	(Canada) Carson Branstine (Ukraine) Marta Kostyuk	2	2
4	(United States) Caty McNally (United States) Whitney Osuigwe	6	6
(Serbia) Olga Danilović (Slovenia) Kaja Juvan	6	6
(Mexico) María José Portillo Ramírez (United States) Sofia Sewing	4	3

Final
4	(United States) Caty McNally (United States) Whitney Osuigwe	4	3
(Serbia) Olga Danilović (Slovenia) Kaja Juvan	6	6

=== Top half ===
First round
1	(Canada) Carson Branstine (Ukraine) Marta Kostyuk	6	6
WC	(United Kingdom) Maria Budin (United Kingdom) Eliz Maloney	2	1
(United States) Elysia Bolton (United States) Ann Li	1	3
(Switzerland) Ylena In-Albon (Switzerland) Simona Waltert	6	6
(Croatia) Lea Bošković (Italy) Tatiana Pieri	1	2
(Russia) Valeriya Deminova (Russia) Anastasia Kharitonova	6	6
WC	(United Kingdom) Holly Fischer (United Kingdom) Emma Raducanu	5	3
8	(Colombia) Emiliana Arango (United States) Ellie Douglas	7	6
4	(United States) Caty McNally (United States) Whitney Osuigwe	4	6	6
(United Kingdom) Emily Appleton (United Kingdom) Jodie Anna Burrage	6	4	3
(Czech Republic) Karolína Beránková (Russia) Sofya Lansere	3	3
(Colombia) Camila Osorio (Brazil) Thaisa Grana Pedretti	6	6
(Papua New Guinea) Violet Apisah (Norway) Astrid Wanja Brune Olsen	6	4	6
(United States) Victoria Flores (Chile) Fernanda Labraña	3	6	4
(Czech Republic) Denisa Hindová (Russia) Kamilla Rakhimova	1	0
6	(Japan) Mai Hontama (Japan) Yuki Naito	6	6

Second round
1	(Canada) C Branstine (Ukraine) M Kostyuk	6	6
(Switzerland) Y In-Albon (Switzerland) S Waltert	3	3
(Russia) V Deminova (Russia) A Kharitonova	2	1
8	(Colombia) E Arango (United States) E Douglas	6	6
4	(United States) C McNally (United States) W Osuigwe	6	6
(Colombia) C Osorio (Brazil) TG Pedretti	3	3
(Papua New Guinea) V Apisah (Norway) AW Brune Olsen	7^{7}	6
6	(Japan) M Hontama (Japan) Y Naito	6^{2}	3

Quarterfinals
1	(Canada) C Branstine (Ukraine) M Kostyuk	4	6	6
8	(Colombia) E Arango (United States) E Douglas	6	4	3
4	(United States) C McNally (United States) W Osuigwe	6	7^{7}
(Papua New Guinea) V Apisah (Norway) AW Brune Olsen	3	6^{2}

Semifinals
1	(Canada) C Branstine (Ukraine) M Kostyuk	2	2
4	(United States) C McNally (United States) W Osuigwe	6	6

=== Bottom half ===
First round
5	(China) Wang Xinyu (China) Wang Xiyu	7	7
WC	(United Kingdom) Ali Collins (United Kingdom) Francesca Jones	5	5
(Chinese Taipei) Liang En-shuo (Japan) Ayumi Miyamoto	3	1
(Serbia) Olga Danilović (Slovenia) Kaja Juvan	6	6
(Germany) Jule Niemeier (Latvia) Daniela Vismane	6	7
(United States) Hailey Baptiste (United States) Natasha Subhash	2	5
(India) Mahak Jain (India) Mihika Yadav	1	1
3	(United States) Kayla Day (United Kingdom) Katie Swan	6	6
7	(Russia) Amina Anshba (Russia) Elena Rybakina	4	6	6
(United States) Hurricane Tyra Black (Poland) Maja Chwalińska	6	0	2
WC	(United Kingdom) Esther Adeshina (United Kingdom) Gemma Heath	4	5
(Mexico) María José Portillo Ramírez (United States) Sofia Sewing	6	7
(Argentina) María Lourdes Carlé (Japan) Naho Sato	7^{7}	3	3
(India) Zeel Desai (Switzerland) Lulu Sun	6^{4}	6	6
(Finland) Oona Orpana (Germany) Lara Schmidt	2	1
2	(United States) Taylor Johnson (United States) Claire Liu	6	6

Second round
5	(China) Xin Wang (China) Xiy Wang	3	6	2
(Serbia) O Danilović (Slovenia) K Juvan	6	2	6
(Germany) J Niemeier (Latvia) D Vismane	6	6
3	(United States) K Day (United Kingdom) K Swan	3	3
7	(Russia) A Anshba (Russia) E Rybakina	4	4
(Mexico) MJ Portillo Ramírez (United States) S Sewing	6	6
(India) Z Desai (Switzerland) L Sun	5	0
2	(United States) T Johnson (United States) C Liu	7	6

Quarterfinals
(Serbia) O Danilović (Slovenia) K Juvan	6	6
(Germany) J Niemeier (Latvia) D Vismane	1	2
(Mexico) MJ Portillo Ramírez (United States) S Sewing	6	6
2	(United States) T Johnson (United States) C Liu	4	4

Semifinals
(Serbia) O Danilović (Slovenia) K Juvan	6	6
(Mexico) MJ Portillo Ramírez (United States) S Sewing	4	3
