= 2017 Wimbledon Championships – Boys' singles =

Boys' singles
- 2017 Wimbledon Championships

Final
- Champion: (Spain) Alejandro Davidovich Fokina
- Runner-up: (Argentina) Axel Geller
- Score: 7–6^{(7–2)}, 6–3

Events
Singles	men	women		boys	girls
Doubles	men	women	mixed	boys	girls
WC Singles	men	women	quad
WC Doubles	men	women	quad
Legends	men	women	seniors
- Wimbledon Championships

Alejandro Davidovich Fokina won the title, defeating Axel Geller in the final, 7–6^{(7–2)}, 6–3.

Denis Shapovalov was the defending champion, but chose to compete in the gentlemen's singles event instead. He lost to Jerzy Janowicz in the first round.

== Seeds ==
1. (France) Corentin Moutet (semifinals)
2. (China) Wu Yibing (quarterfinals)
3. (Hungary) Zsombor Piros (first round)
4. (Chinese Taipei) Hsu Yu-hsiou (first round)
5. (Japan) Yuta Shimizu (second round)
6. (Serbia) Marko Miladinović (second round)
7. (United States) Trent Bryde (first round)
8. (Spain) Alejandro Davidovich Fokina (champion)
9. (Germany) Rudolf Molleker (second round)
10. (United States) Oliver Crawford (third round)
11. (Austria) Jurij Rodionov (quarterfinals)
12. (Israel) Yshai Oliel (second round)
13. (Brazil) Thiago Seyboth Wild (first round)
14. (Belgium) Zizou Bergs (first round)
15. (Portugal) Duarte Vale (first round)
16. (Argentina) Juan Pablo Grassi Mazzuchi (second round)

== Draw ==
Key

- Q = Qualifier
- WC = Wild card
- LL = Lucky loser
- Alt = Alternate
- ITF = ITF entry
- PR = Protected ranking
- SR = Special ranking
- SE = Special exempt
- JE = Junior exempt
- JR = Junior Accelerator Programme entrant
- CO = College Accelerator Programme entrant
- NG = Next Gen Accelerator Program entrant
- w/o = Walkover
- r = Retired
- d = Defaulted

=== Finals ===
Quarterfinals
1/WC	(France) Corentin Moutet	6	6
11	(Austria) Jurij Rodionov	2	4
(Argentina) Axel Geller	6	7
(France) Matteo Martineau	3	5
(United States) Patrick Kypson	6	6
(Czech Republic) Michael Vrbenský	2	1
8	(Spain) Alejandro Davidovich Fokina	6	6
2	(China) Wu Yibing	2	4

Semifinals
1/WC	(France) Corentin Moutet	6	3	3
(Argentina) Axel Geller	1	6	6
(United States) Patrick Kypson	4	4
8	(Spain) Alejandro Davidovich Fokina	6	6

Final
(Argentina) Axel Geller	6^{2}	3
8	(Spain) Alejandro Davidovich Fokina	7^{7}	6

=== Top half ===
==== Section 1 ====
First round
1/WC	(France) Corentin Moutet	6	6
(Argentina) Sebastián Báez	4	3
(United States) Alafia Ayeni	6	4	4
(Cyprus) Menelaos Efstathiou	3	6	6
(Czech Republic) Tomáš Macháč	6	5	1
WC	(United Kingdom) Hamish Stewart	4	7	6
Q	(Italy) Francesco Forti	6	6
13	(Brazil) Thiago Seyboth Wild	4	4
11	(Austria) Jurij Rodionov	7^{7}	6
SE	(France) Louis Dussin	6^{5}	3
(Chinese Taipei) Tseng Chun-hsin	6	6^{10}	4
(Japan) Shinji Hazawa	3	7^{12}	6
(Russia) Artem Dubrivnyy	2	7	4
(Mexico) Alan Fernando Rubio Fierros	6	5	6
(Australia) Blake Ellis	7^{7}	6^{5}	6
7	(United States) Trent Bryde	6^{2}	7^{7}	1

Second round
1/WC	(France) C Moutet	6	6
(Cyprus) M Efstathiou	3	2
WC	(United Kingdom) H Stewart	5	5
Q	(Italy) F Forti	7	7
11	(Austria) J Rodionov	7	7
(Japan) S Hazawa	5	5
(Mexico) AF Rubio Fierros	3	6^{3}
(Australia) B Ellis	6	7^{7}

Third round
1/WC	(France) C Moutet	7	6
Q	(Italy) F Forti	5	1
11	(Austria) J Rodionov	6	6^{4}	6
(Australia) B Ellis	3	7^{7}	3

Quarterfinals
1/WC	(France) C Moutet	6	6
11	(Austria) J Rodionov	2	4

==== Section 2 ====
First round
3	(Hungary) Zsombor Piros	2	4
(Russia) Timofey Skatov	6	6
WC	(United Kingdom) Max Stewart	4	4
(Japan) Naoki Tajima	6	6
(Argentina) Axel Geller	6	6
(South Korea) Park Ui-sung	3	3
(United States) Danny Thomas	6	6
14	(Belgium) Zizou Bergs	4	4
12	(Israel) Yshai Oliel	6	6
(United States) Alexandre Rotsaert	3	2
Q	(India) Siddhant Banthia	6	2	5
(France) Matteo Martineau	3	6	7
WC	(United Kingdom) Aidan McHugh	6	2	6
(United States) Gianni Ross	2	6	4
(Czech Republic) Ondřej Štyler	3	6^{7}
6	(Serbia) Marko Miladinović	6	7^{9}

Second round
(Russia) T Skatov	6^{9}	3
(Japan) N Tajima	7^{11}	6
(Argentina) A Geller	6	6
(United States) D Thomas	1	0
12	(Israel) Y Oliel	4	4
(France) M Martineau	6	6
WC	(United Kingdom) A McHugh	6	7^{7}
6	(Serbia) M Miladinović	0	6^{4}

Third round
(Japan) N Tajima	3	6	1
(Argentina) A Geller	6	3	6
(France) M Martineau	6	6^{12}	6
WC	(United Kingdom) A McHugh	3	7^{14}	2

Quarterfinals
(Argentina) A Geller	6	7
(France) M Martineau	3	5

=== Bottom half ===
==== Section 3 ====
First round
5	(Japan) Yuta Shimizu	6	7^{8}
(Netherlands) Ryan Nijboer	1	6^{6}
(United States) Patrick Kypson	6	7^{8}
(Russia) Alexey Zakharov	4	6^{6}
Q	(Mexico) Alex Hernández	3	6	2
WC	(United Kingdom) George Loffhagen	6	4	6
(Finland) Emil Ruusuvuori	3	1^{r}
9	(Germany) Rudolf Molleker	6	3
15	(Portugal) Duarte Vale	4	6^{6}
(Czech Republic) Michael Vrbenský	6	7^{8}
(United States) Sebastian Korda	3	7	6
Q	(Japan) James Kent Trotter	6	5	4
(France) Constantin Bittoun Kouzmine	6	3
WC	(United Kingdom) Anton Matusevich	3	0^{r}
(United States) Sam Riffice	6	7
4	(Chinese Taipei) Hsu Yu-hsiou	4	5

Second round
5	(Japan) Y Shimizu	5	6	5
(United States) P Kypson	7	4	7
WC	(United Kingdom) G Loffhagen	6	6
9	(Germany) R Molleker	4	4
(Czech Republic) M Vrbenský	6	7^{7}
(United States) S Korda	0	6^{5}
(France) C Bittoun Kouzmine	7^{10}	7^{7}
(United States) S Riffice	6^{8}	6^{5}

Third round
(United States) P Kypson	4	6	8
WC	(United Kingdom) G Loffhagen	6	0	6
(Czech Republic) M Vrbenský	6	6
(France) C Bittoun Kouzmine	4	4

Quarterfinals
(United States) P Kypson	6	6
(Czech Republic) M Vrbenský	2	1

==== Section 4 ====
First round
8	(Spain) Alejandro Davidovich Fokina	6	6
(Colombia) Nicolás Mejía	4	4
Q	(United States) Lukas Greif	7	5	2
(France) Dan Added	5	7	6
Q	(Australia) Thomas Bosancic	7	4	3
WC	(United Kingdom) Barnaby Smith	5	6	6
(Japan) Toru Horie	4	5
10	(United States) Oliver Crawford	6	7
16	(Argentina) Juan Pablo Grassi Mazzuchi	6	7^{7}
SE	(France) Hugo Gaston	2	6^{5}
Q	(Italy) Mattia Frinzi	4	4
(Tunisia) Mohamed Ali Bellalouna	6	6
(United States) Vasil Kirkov	2	7	7
Q	(Brazil) João Lucas Reis da Silva	6	5	5
WC	(United Kingdom) Jack Draper	3	2
2	(China) Wu Yibing	6	6

Second round
8	(Spain) A Davidovich Fokina	6	6
(France) D Added	3	1
WC	(United Kingdom) B Smith	6^{3}	2
10	(United States) O Crawford	7^{7}	6
16	(Argentina) JP Grassi Mazzuchi	6^{5}	3
(Tunisia) MA Bellalouna	7^{7}	6
(United States) V Kirkov	1	1
2	(China) Y Wu	6	6

Third round
8	(Spain) A Davidovich Fokina	6	6
10	(United States) O Crawford	1	3
(Tunisia) MA Bellalouna	2	2
2	(China) Y Wu	6	6

Quarterfinals
8	(Spain) A Davidovich Fokina	6	6
2	(China) Y Wu	2	4

== Qualifying ==
=== Seeds ===
1. (United States) Brian Cernoch (qualifying competition)
2. (Ukraine) Nikita Mashtakov (first round)
3. (Republic of Ireland) Simon Carr (first round)
4. (India) Siddhant Banthia (qualified)
5. (Australia) Benard Bruno Nkomba (first round)
6. (Ukraine) Georgii Kravchenko (qualifying competition)
7. (Italy) Francesco Forti (qualified)
8. (Argentina) Thiago Agustín Tirante (qualifying competition)
9. (Colombia) Sergio Luis Hernández Ramírez (first round)
10. (United States) Lukas Greif (qualified)
11. (United States) Andrew Fenty (first round)
12. (Italy) Mattia Frinzi (qualified)
13. (Spain) Carlos Sánchez Jover (qualifying competition)
14. (Romania) Vlad Andrei Dancu (first round)
15. (United States) Sangeet Sridhar (first round; retired)
16. (Australia) Thomas Bosancic (qualified)

=== Qualifiers ===
1. (Australia) Thomas Bosancic
2. (Mexico) Alex Hernández
3. (United States) Lukas Greif
4. (India) Siddhant Banthia
5. (Brazil) João Lucas Reis da Silva
6. (Italy) Mattia Frinzi
7. (Italy) Francesco Forti
8. (Japan) James Kent Trotter

=== Draw ===
==== First qualifier ====
First round
1	(United States) Brian Cernoch	6	6
(Netherlands) Jesper de Jong	3	3
(United Kingdom) Dominic West	6^{0}	5
16	(Australia) Thomas Bosancic	7^{7}	7

Qualifying competition
1	(United States) Brian Cernoch	3	4
16	(Australia) Thomas Bosancic	6	6

==== Second qualifier ====
First round
2	(Ukraine) Nikita Mashtakov	3	4
(Mexico) Alex Hernández	6	6
(United Kingdom) Damian Rodriguez	4	7^{7}	1
15	(United States) Sangeet Sridhar	6	6^{5}	0^{r}

Qualifying competition
(Mexico) Alex Hernández	6	6
(United Kingdom) Damian Rodriguez	2	3

==== Third qualifier ====
First round
3	(Republic of Ireland) Simon Carr	4	4
(New Zealand) Ajeet Rai	6	6
(Brazil) Gilbert Soares Klier Júnior	6^{6}	3
10	(United States) Lukas Greif	7^{8}	6

Qualifying competition
(New Zealand) Ajeet Rai	6	3	4
10	(United States) Lukas Greif	4	6	6

==== Fourth qualifier ====
First round
4	(India) Siddhant Banthia	6	6
(United Kingdom) Joshua Rose	3	4
(Japan) Taisei Ichikawa	6	6^{3}	5
13	(Spain) Carlos Sánchez Jover	2	7^{7}	7

Qualifying competition
4	(India) Siddhant Banthia	6^{7}	6	6
13	(Spain) Carlos Sánchez Jover	7^{9}	1	1

==== Fifth qualifier ====
First round
5	(Australia) Benard Bruno Nkomba	2	1
(United Kingdom) Finn Bass	6	6
(Brazil) João Lucas Reis da Silva	6	6
11	(United States) Andrew Fenty	1	2

Qualifying competition
(United Kingdom) Finn Bass	6^{4}	6	1
(Brazil) João Lucas Reis da Silva	7^{7}	4	6

==== Sixth qualifier ====
First round
6	(Ukraine) Georgii Kravchenko	6	7
(United Kingdom) Emile Hudd	2	5
(Chile) Matías Soto	2	6	4
12	(Italy) Mattia Frinzi	6	2	6

Qualifying competition
6	(Ukraine) Georgii Kravchenko	6	1	2
12	(Italy) Mattia Frinzi	1	6	6

==== Seventh qualifier ====
First round
7	(Italy) Francesco Forti	6	6
(Turkey) Yankı Erel	2	3
(United Kingdom) Jack Molloy	6	6
9	(Colombia) Sergio Luis Hernández Ramírez	1	0

Qualifying competition
7	(Italy) Francesco Forti	6	3	6
(United Kingdom) Jack Molloy	3	6	3

==== Eighth qualifier ====
First round
8	(Argentina) Thiago Agustín Tirante	2	6	6
(United Kingdom) Harry Wendelken	6	4	2
(Japan) James Kent Trotter	7	7
14	(Romania) Vlad Andrei Dancu	5	5

Qualifying competition
8	(Argentina) Thiago Agustín Tirante	6	6^{7}	2
(Japan) James Kent Trotter	4	7^{9}	6
