= 2017 Wimbledon Championships – Gentlemen's invitation doubles =

Gentlemen's invitation doubles
- 2017 Wimbledon Championships

Final
- Champions: (Australia) Lleyton Hewitt (Australia) Mark Philippoussis
- Runners-up: (United States) Justin Gimelstob (United Kingdom) Ross Hutchins
- Score: 6–3, 6–3

Events
Singles	men	women		boys	girls
Doubles	men	women	mixed	boys	girls
WC Singles	men	women	quad
WC Doubles	men	women	quad
Legends	men	women	seniors
← 2016 ·	Wimbledon Championships	· 2018 →

Greg Rusedski and Fabrice Santoro were the defending champions, but were eliminated in the round robin.

Lleyton Hewitt and Mark Philippoussis defeated Justin Gimelstob and Ross Hutchins in the final, 6–3, 6–3 to win the gentlemen's invitation doubles tennis title at the 2017 Wimbledon Championships.

== Draw ==
=== Key ===
- Q = Qualifier
- WC = Wild card
- LL = Lucky loser
- Alt = Alternate
- ITF = ITF entry
- PR = Protected ranking
- SR = Special ranking
- SE = Special exempt
- JE = Junior exempt
- JR = Junior Accelerator Programme entrant
- CO = College Accelerator Programme entrant
- NG = Next Gen Accelerator Program entrant
- w/o = Walkover
- r = Retired
- d = Defaulted

=== Final ===
Final
(Australia) Lleyton Hewitt (Australia) Mark Philippoussis	6	6
(United States) Justin Gimelstob (United Kingdom) Ross Hutchins	3	3

=== Group A ===
		(United Kingdom) Baker (United Kingdom) Fleming	(Iran) Bahrami (France) Clément (France) Llodra	(Australia) Hewitt (Australia) Philippoussis	(United Kingdom) Rusedski (France) Santoro	RR; W–L	Set; W–L	Game; W–L	Standings
A1	(United Kingdom) Jamie Baker (United Kingdom) Colin Fleming		4–6, 4–6 (w/ Clément)	6–4, 2–6, [6–10]	6–7^{(3–7)}, 5–7	0–3	1–6	27–37	3
A2	(Iran) Mansour Bahrami (France) Arnaud Clément (France) Michaël Llodra	6–4, 6–4 (w/ Clément)		4–6, 6–4, [7–10] (w/ Bahrami)	4–6, 6–3, [7–10] (w/ Bahrami)	0–2; 1–0	2–4; 2–0	20–21; 12–8	4 X
A3	(Australia) Lleyton Hewitt (Australia) Mark Philippoussis	4–6, 6–2, [10–6]	6–4, 4–6, [10–7] (w/ Bahrami)		4–6, 7–5, [15–13]	3–0	6–3	34–29	1
A4	(United Kingdom) Greg Rusedski (France) Fabrice Santoro	7–6^{(7–3)}, 7–5	6–4, 3–6, [10–7] (w/ Bahrami)	6–4, 5–7, [13–15]		2–1	5–3	35–33	2

Standings are determined by: 1. number of wins; 2. number of matches; 3. in two-players-ties, head-to-head records; 4. in three-players-ties, percentage of sets won, or of games won; 5. steering-committee decision.

=== Group B ===
		(Croatia) Ančić (United Kingdom) Delgado	(Sweden) Enqvist (Sweden) Johansson	(United States) Gimelstob (United Kingdom) Hutchins	(Chile) González (France) Grosjean	RR; W–L	Set; W–L	Game; W–L	Standings
B1	(Croatia) Mario Ančić (United Kingdom) Jamie Delgado		7–5, 4–6, [13–11]	2–6, 5–7	6–7^{(3–7)}, 6–4, [6–10]	1–2	3–5	31–36	3
B2	(Sweden) Thomas Enqvist (Sweden) Thomas Johansson	5–7, 6–4, [11–13]		6–4, 6–3	7–6^{(7–4)}, 3–6, [11–13]	1–2	4–4	33–32	4
B3	(United States) Justin Gimelstob (United Kingdom) Ross Hutchins	6–2, 7–5	4–6, 3–6		6–3, 7–5	2–1	4–2	33–27	1
B4	(Chile) Fernando González (France) Sébastien Grosjean	7–6^{(7–3)}, 4–6, [10–6]	6–7^{(4–7)}, 6–3, [13–11]	3–6, 5–7		2–1	4–4	33–35	2

Standings are determined by: 1. number of wins; 2. number of matches; 3. in two-players-ties, head-to-head records; 4. in three-players-ties, percentage of sets won, or of games won; 5. steering-committee decision.
