= 2017 Wimbledon Championships – Wheelchair women's doubles =

Wheelchair women's doubles
- 2017 Wimbledon Championships

Final
- Champions: (Japan) Yui Kamiji (United Kingdom) Jordanne Whiley
- Runners-up: (Netherlands) Marjolein Buis (Netherlands) Diede de Groot
- Score: 2–6, 6–3, 6–0

Events
Singles	men	women		boys	girls
Doubles	men	women	mixed	boys	girls
WC Singles	men	women	quad
WC Doubles	men	women	quad
Legends	men	women	seniors
← 2016 ·	Wimbledon Championships	· 2018 →

Three-time defending champions Yui Kamiji and Jordanne Whiley defeated Marjolein Buis and Diede de Groot in the final, 2–6, 6–3, 6–0 to win the ladies' doubles wheelchair tennis title at the 2017 Wimbledon Championships.

== Seeds ==
1. (Netherlands) Jiske Griffioen / (Netherlands) Aniek van Koot (Griffioen withdrew and was replaced by Dana Mathewson) (semifinals)
2. (Netherlands) Marjolein Buis / (Netherlands) Diede de Groot (final)

== Draw ==
=== Key ===
- Q = Qualifier
- WC = Wild card
- LL = Lucky loser
- Alt = Alternate
- ITF = ITF entry
- PR = Protected ranking
- SR = Special ranking
- SE = Special exempt
- JE = Junior exempt
- JR = Junior Accelerator Programme entrant
- CO = College Accelerator Programme entrant
- NG = Next Gen Accelerator Program entrant
- w/o = Walkover
- r = Retired
- d = Defaulted

=== Finals ===
Semifinals
Alt	(United States) Dana Mathewson (Netherlands) Aniek van Koot	4	4
(Japan) Yui Kamiji (United Kingdom) Jordanne Whiley	6	6
(Germany) Sabine Ellerbrock (United Kingdom) Lucy Shuker	4	1
2	(Netherlands) Marjolein Buis (Netherlands) Diede de Groot	6	6

Final
(Japan) Yui Kamiji (United Kingdom) Jordanne Whiley	2	6	6
2	(Netherlands) Marjolein Buis (Netherlands) Diede de Groot	6	3	0
