= 2017 Wimbledon Championships – Mixed doubles =

Mixed doubles
- 2017 Wimbledon Championships

Final
- Champions: (United Kingdom) Jamie Murray (Switzerland) Martina Hingis
- Runners-up: (Finland) Henri Kontinen (United Kingdom) Heather Watson
- Score: 6–4, 6–4

Details
- Draw: 48
- Seeds: 16

Events
Singles	men	women		boys	girls
Doubles	men	women	mixed	boys	girls
WC Singles	men	women	quad
WC Doubles	men	women	quad
Legends	men	women	seniors
- Wimbledon Championships

Henri Kontinen and Heather Watson were the defending champions, but lost in the final to Jamie Murray and Martina Hingis, 4–6, 4–6. This was the second Wimbledon mixed doubles title for both Murray and Hingis. This was the first time since 1934 that both teams in the final featured a British player.

== Seeds ==
All seeds received a bye into the second round.

1. (United Kingdom) Jamie Murray / (Switzerland) Martina Hingis (champions)
2. (Brazil) Bruno Soares / (Russia) Elena Vesnina (semifinals)
3. (Poland) Łukasz Kubot / (Chinese Taipei) Chan Yung-jan (withdrew)
4. (Croatia) Ivan Dodig / (India) Sania Mirza (third round)
5. (France) Édouard Roger-Vasselin / (Czech Republic) Andrea Hlaváčková (second round)
6. (United States) Rajeev Ram / (Australia) Casey Dellacqua (second round)
7. (South Africa) Raven Klaasen / (Slovenia) Katarina Srebotnik (second round)
8. (Netherlands) Jean-Julien Rojer / (Chinese Taipei) Chan Hao-ching (second round)

9. (Colombia) Juan Sebastián Cabal / (United States) Abigail Spears (third round)
10. (India) Rohan Bopanna / (Canada) Gabriela Dabrowski (quarterfinals)
11. (Canada) Daniel Nestor / (Slovenia) Andreja Klepač (third round)
12. (Belarus) Max Mirnyi / (Russia) Ekaterina Makarova (third round)
13. (Pakistan) Aisam-ul-Haq Qureshi / (Germany) Anna-Lena Grönefeld (second round)
14. (Poland) Marcin Matkowski / (Czech Republic) Květa Peschke (second round)
15. (New Zealand) Michael Venus / (Czech Republic) Barbora Krejčíková (third round)
16. (Czech Republic) Roman Jebavý / (Czech Republic) Lucie Hradecká (third round)

Click on the seed number of a player to go to their draw section.

== Draw ==
Key

- Q = Qualifier
- WC = Wild card
- LL = Lucky loser
- Alt = Alternate
- ITF = ITF entry
- PR = Protected ranking
- SR = Special ranking
- SE = Special exempt
- JE = Junior exempt
- JR = Junior Accelerator Programme entrant
- CO = College Accelerator Programme entrant
- NG = Next Gen Accelerator Program entrant
- w/o = Walkover
- r = Retired
- d = Defaulted

=== Finals ===
Quarterfinals
1	(United Kingdom) Jamie Murray (Switzerland) Martina Hingis	6	6
WC	(United Kingdom) Ken Skupski (United Kingdom) Jocelyn Rae	4	4
(Brazil) Marcelo Demoliner (Spain) María José Martínez Sánchez	6	2	6
(Croatia) Mate Pavić (Ukraine) Lyudmyla Kichenok	3	6	3
10	(India) Rohan Bopanna (Canada) Gabriela Dabrowski	7^{7}	4	5
(Finland) Henri Kontinen (United Kingdom) Heather Watson	6^{4}	6	7
(Germany) Andre Begemann (United States) Nicole Melichar	5	4
2	(Brazil) Bruno Soares (Russia) Elena Vesnina	7	6

Semifinals
1	(United Kingdom) Jamie Murray (Switzerland) Martina Hingis	6	7
(Brazil) Marcelo Demoliner (Spain) María José Martínez Sánchez	2	5
(Finland) Henri Kontinen (United Kingdom) Heather Watson	6	6^{6}	6
2	(Brazil) Bruno Soares (Russia) Elena Vesnina	4	7^{8}	3

Final
1	(United Kingdom) Jamie Murray (Switzerland) Martina Hingis	6	6
(Finland) Henri Kontinen (United Kingdom) Heather Watson	4	4

=== Top half ===
==== Section 1 ====
First round
WC	(United Kingdom) N Skupski (United Kingdom) A Smith	7	6
WC	(United Kingdom) J Salisbury (United Kingdom) K Dunne	5	3
Alt	(Netherlands) W Koolhof (Netherlands) D Schuurs	4	3
WC	(United Kingdom) L Broady (United Kingdom) N Broady	6	6
(Argentina) A Molteni (Switzerland) X Knoll	2	5
(Germany) P Petzschner (Belgium) K Flipkens	6	7
(India) D Sharan (China) Z Yang	3	4
WC	(United Kingdom) K Skupski (United Kingdom) J Rae	6	6

Second round
1	(United Kingdom) J Murray (Switzerland) M Hingis	6	6
WC	(United Kingdom) N Skupski (United Kingdom) A Smith	3	0
WC	(United Kingdom) L Broady (United Kingdom) N Broady	4	5
16	(Czech Republic) R Jebavý (Czech Republic) L Hradecká	6	7
12	(Belarus) M Mirnyi (Russia) E Makarova	6	6
(Germany) P Petzschner (Belgium) K Flipkens	1	3
WC	(United Kingdom) K Skupski (United Kingdom) J Rae	6	7
5	(France) É Roger-Vasselin (Czech Republic) A Hlaváčková	4	5

Third round
1	(United Kingdom) J Murray (Switzerland) M Hingis	6	6
16	(Czech Republic) R Jebavý (Czech Republic) L Hradecká	3	4
12	(Belarus) M Mirnyi (Russia) E Makarova	7	4	7
WC	(United Kingdom) K Skupski (United Kingdom) J Rae	5	6	9

Quarterfinals
1	(United Kingdom) J Murray (Switzerland) M Hingis	6	6
WC	(United Kingdom) K Skupski (United Kingdom) J Rae	4	4

==== Section 2 ====
First round
(United States) S Lipsky (Russia) A Kudryavtseva	4	6^{4}
(Australia) J Peers (Germany) S Lisicki	6	7^{7}
(Australia) J-P Smith (United States) S Stephens	3	6	7
(Brazil) M Demoliner (Spain) MJ Martínez Sánchez	6	3	9
(United States) N Monroe (United States) A Muhammad	5	4
(New Zealand) A Sitak (Ukraine) O Savchuk	7	6
(Croatia) M Pavić (Ukraine) L Kichenok	6	7^{7}
(New Zealand) M Daniell (Croatia) D Jurak	3	6^{3}

Second round
Alt	(United Kingdom) B Klein (United Kingdom) H Dart	1	4
(Australia) J Peers (Germany) S Lisicki	6	6
(Brazil) M Demoliner (Spain) MJ Martínez Sánchez	6	6
14	(Poland) M Matkowski (Czech Republic) K Peschke	2	4
9	(Colombia) JS Cabal (United States) A Spears	6	7^{7}
(New Zealand) A Sitak (Ukraine) O Savchuk	2	6^{5}
(Croatia) M Pavić (Ukraine) L Kichenok	6	7
7	(South Africa) R Klaasen (Slovenia) K Srebotnik	4	5

Third round
(Australia) J Peers (Germany) S Lisicki	4	6	5
(Brazil) M Demoliner (Spain) MJ Martínez Sánchez	6	3	7
9	(Colombia) JS Cabal (United States) A Spears	6^{5}	7	3
(Croatia) M Pavić (Ukraine) L Kichenok	7^{7}	5	6

Quarterfinals
(Brazil) M Demoliner (Spain) MJ Martínez Sánchez	6	2	6
(Croatia) M Pavić (Ukraine) L Kichenok	3	6	3

=== Bottom half ===
==== Section 3 ====
First round
(Brazil) A Sá (United States) R Atawo	5	7^{7}	10
(Croatia) N Mektić (Croatia) A Konjuh	7	6^{3}	12
(India) L Paes (China) Y Xu	7	3	2
(France) F Martin (Romania) R Olaru	5	6	6
(Serbia) N Zimonjić (Belarus) V Azarenka	3	4
(Finland) H Kontinen (United Kingdom) H Watson	6	6
Alt	(Japan) Yu Watanuki (Japan) M Ninomiya	4	6	6
(Russia) D Tursunov (Australia) D Gavrilova	6	3	4

Second round
8	(Netherlands) J-J Rojer (Chinese Taipei) H-c Chan	4	6^{5}
(Croatia) N Mektić (Croatia) A Konjuh	6	7^{7}
(France) F Martin (Romania) R Olaru	6^{2}	5
10	(India) R Bopanna (Canada) G Dabrowski	7^{7}	7
13	(Pakistan) A-u-H Qureshi (Germany) A-L Grönefeld	1	3
(Finland) H Kontinen (United Kingdom) H Watson	6	6
Alt	(Japan) Yu Watanuki (Japan) M Ninomiya	6^{5}	2
4	(Croatia) I Dodig (India) S Mirza	7^{7}	6

Third round
(Croatia) N Mektić (Croatia) A Konjuh	6^{5}	2
10	(India) R Bopanna (Canada) G Dabrowski	7^{7}	6
(Finland) H Kontinen (United Kingdom) H Watson	7^{7}	6
4	(Croatia) I Dodig (India) S Mirza	6^{4}	4

Quarterfinals
10	(India) R Bopanna (Canada) G Dabrowski	7^{7}	4	5
(Finland) H Kontinen (United Kingdom) H Watson	6^{4}	6	7

==== Section 4 ====
First round
WC	(United Kingdom) D Inglot (United Kingdom) L Robson	3	4
(Germany) A Begemann (United States) N Melichar	6	6
Alt	(United States) J Cerretani (Czech Republic) R Voráčová	7	4	2
(India) P Raja (Japan) E Hozumi	5	6	6
Alt	(United Kingdom) C Norrie (United Kingdom) K Swan	3	5
(Russia) M Elgin (Australia) An Rodionova	6	7
(United States) J Sock (United States) M Keys	6	6
(Argentina) G Durán (Poland) A Rosolska	4	4

Second round
6	(United States) R Ram (Australia) C Dellacqua	6	3	13
(Germany) A Begemann (United States) N Melichar	1	6	15
(India) P Raja (Japan) E Hozumi	2	5
11	(Canada) D Nestor (Slovenia) A Klepač	6	7
15	(New Zealand) M Venus (Czech Republic) B Krejčíková	4	6	6
(Russia) M Elgin (Australia) An Rodionova	6	3	4
(United States) J Sock (United States) M Keys	3	6	5
2	(Brazil) B Soares (Russia) E Vesnina	6	3	7

Third round
(Germany) A Begemann (United States) N Melichar	6	6^{4}	7
11	(Canada) D Nestor (Slovenia) A Klepač	3	7^{7}	5
15	(New Zealand) M Venus (Czech Republic) B Krejčíková	7^{7}	4	2
2	(Brazil) B Soares (Russia) E Vesnina	6^{4}	6	6

Quarterfinals
(Germany) A Begemann (United States) N Melichar	5	4
2	(Brazil) B Soares (Russia) E Vesnina	7	6
