= 2017 Wimbledon Championships – Ladies' invitation doubles =

Ladies' invitation doubles
- 2017 Wimbledon Championships

Final
- Champions: (Zimbabwe) Cara Black (United States) Martina Navratilova
- Runners-up: (Spain) Arantxa Sánchez Vicario (Tunisia) Selima Sfar
- Score: 6–2, 4–6, [10–4]

Events
| Singles | men | women | | boys | girls |
| Doubles | men | women | mixed | boys | girls |
| WC Singles | men | women | quad |
| WC Doubles | men | women | quad |
| Legends | men | women | seniors |
| ← 2016 · | Wimbledon Championships | · 2018 → |

Martina Navratilova and Selima Sfar were the defending champions but they chose not to compete together.

Navratilova partnered with Cara Black and defeated Sfar and her partner Arantxa Sánchez Vicario in the final, 6–2, 4–6, [10–4] to win the ladies' invitation doubles tennis title at the 2017 Wimbledon Championships.

== Draw ==
=== Key ===
- Q = Qualifier
- WC = Wild card
- LL = Lucky loser
- Alt = Alternate
- ITF = ITF entry
- PR = Protected ranking
- SR = Special ranking
- SE = Special exempt
- JE = Junior exempt
- JR = Junior Accelerator Programme entrant
- CO = College Accelerator Programme entrant
- NG = Next Gen Accelerator Program entrant
- w/o = Walkover
- r = Retired
- d = Defaulted

=== Final ===
| Final |
| (Zimbabwe) Cara Black (United States) Martina Navratilova | 6 | 4 | [10] |
| (Spain) Arantxa Sánchez Vicario (Tunisia) Selima Sfar | 2 | 6 | [4] |

=== Group A ===
| | | (United States) Austin (Czech Republic) Suková | (Zimbabwe) Black (United States) Navratilova | (Belgium) Clijsters (Australia) Stubbs | (United States) Jaeger (Spain) Martínez | RR; W–L | Set; W–L | Game; W–L | Standings |
| A1 | (United States) Tracy Austin (Czech Republic) Helena Suková | | 3–6, 4–6 | 1–6, 2–6 | 3–6, 6–3, [10–4] | 1–2 | 2–5 | 20–33 | 3 |
| A2 | (Zimbabwe) Cara Black (United States) Martina Navratilova | 6–3, 6–4 | | 6–3, 6–4 | 6–3, 6–1 | 3–0 | 6–0 | 36–18 | 1 |
| A3 | (Belgium) Kim Clijsters (Australia) Rennae Stubbs | 6–1, 6–2 | 3–6, 4–6 | | 6–2, 7–5 | 2–1 | 4–2 | 32–22 | 2 |
| A4 | (United States) Andrea Jaeger (Spain) Conchita Martínez | 6–3, 3–6, [4–10] | 3–6, 1–6 | 2–6, 5–7 | | 0–3 | 1–6 | 20–35 | 4 |

Standings are determined by: 1. number of wins; 2. number of matches; 3. in two-players-ties, head-to-head records; 4. in three-players-ties, percentage of sets won, or of games won; 5. steering-committee decision.

=== Group B ===
| | | (France) Bartoli (Croatia) Majoli | (United States) Davenport (United States) Fernández | (Bulgaria) Maleeva (Austria) Schett | (Spain) Sánchez Vicario (Tunisia) Sfar | RR; W–L | Set; W–L | Game; W–L | Standings |
| B1 | (France) Marion Bartoli (Croatia) Iva Majoli | | 2–6, 2–6 | 1–6, 2–6 | 3–6, 0–6 | 0–3 | 0–6 | 10–36 | 4 |
| B2 | (United States) Lindsay Davenport (United States) Mary Joe Fernández | 6–2, 6–2 | | 6–4, 6–1 | 6–4, 4–6, [3–10] | 2–1 | 5–2 | 34–20 | 2 |
| B3 | (Bulgaria) Magdalena Maleeva (Austria) Barbara Schett | 6–1, 6–2 | 4–6, 1–6 | | 2–6, 6–1, [8–10] | 1–2 | 3–4 | 25–23 | 3 |
| B4 | (Spain) Arantxa Sánchez Vicario (Tunisia) Selima Sfar | 6–3, 6–0 | 4–6, 6–4, [10–3] | 6–2, 1–6, [10–8] | | 3–0 | 6–2 | 31–21 | 1 |

Standings are determined by: 1. number of wins; 2. number of matches; 3. in two-players-ties, head-to-head records; 4. in three-players-ties, percentage of sets won, or of games won; 5. steering-committee decision.
