= 2017 Wimbledon Championships – Boys' doubles =

Boys' doubles
- 2017 Wimbledon Championships

Final
- Champions: (Argentina) Axel Geller (Chinese Taipei) Hsu Yu-hsiou
- Runners-up: (Austria) Jurij Rodionov (Czech Republic) Michael Vrbenský
- Score: 6–4, 6–4

Events
Singles	men	women		boys	girls
Doubles	men	women	mixed	boys	girls
WC Singles	men	women	quad
WC Doubles	men	women	quad
Legends	men	women	seniors
- Wimbledon Championships

Kenneth Raisma and Stefanos Tsitsipas were the defending champions but both players were no longer eligible to participate in junior events.

Axel Geller and Hsu Yu-hsiou won the title, defeating Jurij Rodionov and Michael Vrbenský in the final, 6–4, 6–4.

== Seeds ==
1. (Hungary) Zsombor Piros / (China) Wu Yibing (second round)
2. (Argentina) Axel Geller / (Chinese Taipei) Hsu Yu-hsiou (champions)
3. (Austria) Jurij Rodionov / (Czech Republic) Michael Vrbenský (final)
4. (Germany) Rudolf Molleker / (Finland) Emil Ruusuvuori (withdrew)
5. (United States) Gianni Ross / (Brazil) Thiago Seyboth Wild (first round)
6. (United States) Alafia Ayeni / (United States) Trent Bryde (second round)
7. (Serbia) Marko Miladinović / (Chinese Taipei) Tseng Chun-hsin (first round)
8. (Argentina) Sebastián Báez / (Argentina) Juan Pablo Grassi Mazzuchi (first round)
9. (France) Dan Added / (Belgium) Zizou Bergs (first round)

== Draw ==
Key

- Q = Qualifier
- WC = Wild card
- LL = Lucky loser
- Alt = Alternate
- ITF = ITF entry
- PR = Protected ranking
- SR = Special ranking
- SE = Special exempt
- JE = Junior exempt
- JR = Junior Accelerator Programme entrant
- CO = College Accelerator Programme entrant
- NG = Next Gen Accelerator Program entrant
- w/o = Walkover
- r = Retired
- d = Defaulted

=== Finals ===
Semifinals
(United States) Sebastian Korda (Colombia) Nicolás Mejía	3	4
3	(Austria) Jurij Rodionov (Czech Republic) Michael Vrbenský	6	6
(Australia) Blake Ellis (France) Matteo Martineau	6^{5}	7^{7}	8
2	(Argentina) Axel Geller (Chinese Taipei) Hsu Yu-hsiou	7^{7}	6^{3}	10

Final
3	(Austria) Jurij Rodionov (Czech Republic) Michael Vrbenský	4	4
2	(Argentina) Axel Geller (Chinese Taipei) Hsu Yu-hsiou	6	6

=== Top half ===
First round
1	(Hungary) Zsombor Piros (China) Wu Yibing	6	6
(Tunisia) Mohamed Ali Bellalouna (Brazil) João Lucas Reis da Silva	1	4
(United States) Sebastian Korda (Colombia) Nicolás Mejía	6	6
WC	(United Kingdom) Jack Molloy (United Kingdom) Barnaby Smith	3	4
(Japan) Toru Horie (Japan) Yuta Shimizu	6	6
(United States) Oliver Crawford (United States) Patrick Kypson	3	2
(France) Louis Dussin (France) Hugo Gaston	7^{7}	7^{8}
5	(United States) Gianni Ross (Brazil) Thiago Seyboth Wild	6^{5}	6^{6}
3	(Austria) Jurij Rodionov (Czech Republic) Michael Vrbenský	7^{9}	6
WC	(United Kingdom) Jack Draper (United Kingdom) George Loffhagen	6^{7}	3
(United States) Vasil Kirkov (United States) Danny Thomas	6	6
(United States) Sam Riffice (Portugal) Duarte Vale	4	4
(Mexico) Alex Hernández (Mexico) Alan Fernando Rubio Fierros	7	1	4
(Republic of Ireland) Simon Carr (United States) Alexandre Rotsaert	5	6	6
(Czech Republic) Ondřej Štyler (Russia) Alexey Zakharov	6	4	7
7	(Serbia) Marko Miladinović (Chinese Taipei) Tseng Chun-hsin	2	6	5

Second round
1	(Hungary) Z Piros (China) Y Wu	6^{2}	6	4
(United States) S Korda (Colombia) N Mejía	7^{7}	4	6
(Japan) T Horie (Japan) Y Shimizu	7^{7}	7^{7}
(France) L Dussin (France) H Gaston	6^{3}	6^{4}
3	(Austria) J Rodionov (Czech Republic) M Vrbenský	3	7	6
(United States) V Kirkov (United States) D Thomas	6	5	3
(Republic of Ireland) S Carr (United States) A Rotsaert	2	2
(Czech Republic) O Štyler (Russia) A Zakharov	6	6

Quarterfinals
(United States) S Korda (Colombia) N Mejía	1	6	6
(Japan) T Horie (Japan) Y Shimizu	6	3	2
3	(Austria) J Rodionov (Czech Republic) M Vrbenský	7^{9}	7^{7}
(Czech Republic) O Štyler (Russia) A Zakharov	6^{7}	6^{5}

Semifinals
(United States) S Korda (Colombia) N Mejía	3	4
3	(Austria) J Rodionov (Czech Republic) M Vrbenský	6	6

=== Bottom half ===
First round
8	(Argentina) Sebastián Báez (Argentina) Juan Pablo Grassi Mazzuchi	3	1
WC	(United Kingdom) Finn Bass (United Kingdom) Aidan McHugh	6	6
(United States) Andrew Fenty (Israel) Yshai Oliel	6	6
Alt	(United States) Brian Cernoch (Netherlands) Jesper de Jong	4	2
(Australia) Thomas Bosancic (United States) Lukas Greif
(France) Constantin Bittoun Kouzmine (South Korea) Park Ui-sung	w/o
(Australia) Blake Ellis (France) Matteo Martineau	6	7^{7}
9	(France) Dan Added (Belgium) Zizou Bergs	3	6^{5}
6	(United States) Alafia Ayeni (United States) Trent Bryde	6	6
Alt	(United Kingdom) Hamish Stewart (United Kingdom) Dominic West	3	4
(Czech Republic) Tomáš Macháč (Russia) Timofey Skatov	4	6	3
(Cyprus) Menelaos Efstathiou (Netherlands) Ryan Nijboer	6	3	6
(Japan) Shinji Hazawa (Japan) Naoki Tajima	6	1	6
(Italy) Francesco Forti (Italy) Mattia Frinzi	3	6	8
(India) Siddhant Banthia (Japan) James Kent Trotter	6	3	7
2	(Argentina) Axel Geller (Chinese Taipei) Hsu Yu-hsiou	4	6	9

Second round
WC	(United Kingdom) F Bass (United Kingdom) A McHugh	6^{3}	4
(United States) A Fenty (Israel) Y Oliel	7^{7}	6
(France) C Bittoun Kouzmine (South Korea) U-s Park	3	2
(Australia) B Ellis (France) M Martineau	6	6
6	(United States) A Ayeni (United States) T Bryde	4	6	4
(Cyprus) M Efstathiou (Netherlands) R Nijboer	6	1	6
(Italy) F Forti (Italy) M Frinzi	3	2
2	(Argentina) A Geller (Chinese Taipei) Y-h Hsu	6	6

Quarterfinals
(United States) A Fenty (Israel) Y Oliel	3	2
(Australia) B Ellis (France) M Martineau	6	6
(Cyprus) M Efstathiou (Netherlands) R Nijboer	2	1
2	(Argentina) A Geller (Chinese Taipei) Y-h Hsu	6	6

Semifinals
(Australia) B Ellis (France) M Martineau	6^{5}	7^{7}	8
2	(Argentina) A Geller (Chinese Taipei) Y-h Hsu	7^{7}	6^{3}	10
