= 2017 Wimbledon Championships – Wheelchair women's singles =

Wheelchair women's singles
- 2017 Wimbledon Championships

Final
- Champions: (Netherlands) Diede de Groot
- Runners-up: (Germany) Sabine Ellerbrock
- Score: 6–0, 6–4

Events
Singles	men	women		boys	girls
Doubles	men	women	mixed	boys	girls
WC Singles	men	women	quad
WC Doubles	men	women	quad
Legends	men	women	seniors
← 2016 ·	Wimbledon Championships	· 2018 →

Diede de Groot defeated Sabine Ellerbrock in the final, 6–0, 6–4 to win the ladies' singles wheelchair tennis title at the 2017 Wimbledon Championships. It was her first major singles title.

Jiske Griffioen was the defending champion but was defeated in the quarterfinals by Aniek van Koot.

== Seeds ==
1. (Netherlands) Jiske Griffioen (quarterfinals)
2. (Japan) Yui Kamiji (semifinals)

== Draw ==
=== Key ===
- Q = Qualifier
- WC = Wild card
- LL = Lucky loser
- Alt = Alternate
- ITF = ITF entry
- PR = Protected ranking
- SR = Special ranking
- SE = Special exempt
- JE = Junior exempt
- JR = Junior Accelerator Programme entrant
- CO = College Accelerator Programme entrant
- NG = Next Gen Accelerator Program entrant
- w/o = Walkover
- r = Retired
- d = Defaulted

=== Finals ===
Quarterfinals
1	(Netherlands) Jiske Griffioen	3	2
(Netherlands) Aniek van Koot	6	6
(United Kingdom) Jordanne Whiley	2	6^{4}
(Netherlands) Diede de Groot	6	7^{7}
(Netherlands) Marjolein Buis	6	6^{6}	4
(Germany) Sabine Ellerbrock	4	7^{8}	6
WC	(United Kingdom) Lucy Shuker	3	1
2	(Japan) Yui Kamiji	6	6

Semifinals
(Netherlands) Aniek van Koot	0	2
(Netherlands) Diede de Groot	6	6
(Germany) Sabine Ellerbrock	7^{7}	1	7^{7}
2	(Japan) Yui Kamiji	6^{4}	6	6^{4}

Final
(Netherlands) Diede de Groot	6	6
(Germany) Sabine Ellerbrock	0	4
