= 2017 Wimbledon Championships – Girls' singles =

Girls' singles
- 2017 Wimbledon Championships

Final
- Champion: (United States) Claire Liu
- Runner-up: (United States) Ann Li
- Score: 6–2, 5–7, 6–2

Events
Singles	men	women		boys	girls
Doubles	men	women	mixed	boys	girls
WC Singles	men	women	quad
WC Doubles	men	women	quad
Legends	men	women	seniors
- Wimbledon Championships

Anastasia Potapova was the defending champion, but chose to compete in the Ladies' Singles main draw as a qualifier, where she retired in the first round against Tatjana Maria.

Claire Liu won the title, defeating Ann Li in the final, 6–2, 5–7, 6–2.

== Seeds ==
1. (United States) Kayla Day (quarterfinals)
2. (United States) Whitney Osuigwe (quarterfinals)
3. (United States) Claire Liu (champion)
4. (Russia) Elena Rybakina (first round)
5. (Ukraine) Marta Kostyuk (second round)
6. (Canada) Carson Branstine (quarterfinals)
7. (United States) Taylor Johnson (first round)
8. (United Kingdom) Emily Appleton (second round)
9. (Colombia) Camila Osorio (third round)
10. (China) Wang Xinyu (third round)
11. (Serbia) Olga Danilović (first round)
12. (Japan) Mai Hontama (third round)
13. (China) Wang Xiyu (first round)
14. (United States) Sofia Sewing (quarterfinals)
15. (India) Zeel Desai (third round)
16. (Chinese Taipei) Liang En-shuo (third round)

== Draw ==
Key

- Q = Qualifier
- WC = Wild card
- LL = Lucky loser
- Alt = Alternate
- ITF = ITF entry
- PR = Protected ranking
- SR = Special ranking
- SE = Special exempt
- JE = Junior exempt
- JR = Junior Accelerator Programme entrant
- CO = College Accelerator Programme entrant
- NG = Next Gen Accelerator Program entrant
- w/o = Walkover
- r = Retired
- d = Defaulted

=== Finals ===
Quarterfinals
1	(United States) Kayla Day	6	2	1
(United States) Ann Li	4	6	6
14	(United States) Sofia Sewing	2	6	3
(Switzerland) Simona Waltert	6	3	6
6	(Canada) Carson Branstine	6	1	1
3	(United States) Claire Liu	4	6	6
(Russia) Sofya Lansere	7	6
2	(United States) Whitney Osuigwe	5	3

Semifinals
(United States) Ann Li	7^{7}	6
(Switzerland) Simona Waltert	6^{4}	1
3	(United States) Claire Liu	6	6
(Russia) Sofya Lansere	1	3

Final
(United States) Ann Li	2	7	2
3	(United States) Claire Liu	6	5	6

=== Top half ===
==== Section 1 ====
First round
1	(United States) Kayla Day	7	6
Q	(Switzerland) Lulu Sun	5	4
(Czech Republic) Karolína Beránková	1	5
Q	(Germany) Jule Niemeier	6	7
(Russia) Marta Paigina	6	5	6
WC	(United Kingdom) Esther Adeshina	2	7	1
(Japan) Naho Sato	1	1
15	(India) Zeel Desai	6	6
11	(Serbia) Olga Danilović	2	4
(United States) Ann Li	6	6
(Mexico) María José Portillo Ramírez	2	6	4
WC	(United Kingdom) Eliz Maloney	6	2	6
Q	(United States) Victoria Flores	6^{5}	3
Q	(Poland) Maja Chwalińska	7^{7}	6
(Slovenia) Kaja Juvan	5	3
5	(Ukraine) Marta Kostyuk	7	6

Second round
1	(United States) K Day	6	7^{7}
Q	(Germany) J Niemeier	2	6^{4}
(Russia) M Paigina	7	0^{r}
15	(India) Z Desai	5	1
(United States) A Li	6	4	6
WC	(United Kingdom) E Maloney	2	6	3
Q	(Poland) M Chwalińska	6	6
5	(Ukraine) M Kostyuk	1	4

Third round
1	(United States) K Day	6	6
15	(India) Z Desai	4	4
(United States) A Li	7^{7}	6
Q	(Poland) M Chwalińska	6^{4}	2

Quarterfinals
1	(United States) K Day	6	2	1
(United States) A Li	4	6	6

==== Section 2 ====
First round
4	(Russia) Elena Rybakina	4	6	3
(United States) Ellie Douglas	6	3	6
WC	(United Kingdom) Anna Loughlan	0	3
(Brazil) Thaísa Grana Pedretti	6	6
Q	(Finland) Oona Orpana	6	6
(Argentina) María Lourdes Carlé	0	3
WC	(United Kingdom) Ali Collins	3	7^{10}	7
14	(United States) Sofia Sewing	6	6^{8}	9
10	(China) Wang Xinyu	2	6	6
(United Kingdom) Francesca Jones	6	1	4
(Colombia) Emiliana Arango	4	4
(Spain) Paula Arias Manjón	6	6
(Switzerland) Simona Waltert	6	6
(Japan) Yuki Naito	2	2
(Russia) Amina Anshba	6	6
7/WC	(United States) Taylor Johnson	4	4

Second round
(United States) E Douglas	7^{7}	6
(Brazil) TG Pedretti	6^{5}	4
Q	(Finland) O Orpana	3	2
14	(United States) S Sewing	6	6
10	(China) Xin Wang	6	6
(Spain) P Arias Manjón	1	3
(Switzerland) S Waltert	4	6	6
(Russia) A Anshba	6	1	2

Third round
(United States) E Douglas	3	4
14	(United States) S Sewing	6	6
10	(China) Xin Wang	2	4
(Switzerland) S Waltert	6	6

Quarterfinals
14	(United States) S Sewing	2	6	3
(Switzerland) S Waltert	6	3	6

=== Bottom half ===
==== Section 3 ====
First round
6	(Canada) Carson Branstine	6	6
(Russia) Kamilla Rakhimova	3	2
(United Kingdom) Jodie Anna Burrage	3	6	4
(United States) Elysia Bolton	6	4	6
(Chile) Fernanda Labraña	6	6
(Czech Republic) Denisa Hindová	3	4
WC	(United Kingdom) Holly Fischer	4	1
12	(Japan) Mai Hontama	6	6
16	(Chinese Taipei) Liang En-shuo	6	1	6
Q	(United States) Hurricane Tyra Black	3	6	4
(Russia) Anastasia Kharitonova	1	3
WC	(United Kingdom) Emma Raducanu	6	6
(Croatia) Lea Bošković	6^{4}	6	4
(India) Mahak Jain	7^{7}	4	6
(Italy) Tatiana Pieri	2	1
3	(United States) Claire Liu	6	6

Second round
6	(Canada) C Branstine	6	6
(United States) E Bolton	1	4
(Chile) F Labraña	4	2
12	(Japan) M Hontama	6	6
16	(Chinese Taipei) E-s Liang	6	4	8
WC	(United Kingdom) E Raducanu	1	6	6
(India) M Jain	2	1
3	(United States) C Liu	6	6

Third round
6	(Canada) C Branstine	6	6
12	(Japan) M Hontama	4	2
16	(Chinese Taipei) E-s Liang	3	3
3	(United States) C Liu	6	6

Quarterfinals
6	(Canada) C Branstine	6	1	1
3	(United States) C Liu	4	6	6

==== Section 4 ====
First round
8	(United Kingdom) Emily Appleton	6	4	6
(Japan) Ayumi Miyamoto	2	6	2
(Romania) Mihaela Lorena Mărculescu	7^{7}	3	4
(Russia) Sofya Lansere	6^{4}	6	6
(Norway) Astrid Wanja Brune Olsen	1	6	4
(United States) Hailey Baptiste	6	2	6
(Latvia) Daniela Vismane	3	4
9	(Colombia) Camila Osorio	6	6
13	(China) Wang Xiyu	2	3
(United States) Caty McNally	6	6
Q	(Germany) Lara Schmidt	4	4
(United Kingdom) Katie Swan	6	6
Q	(Papua New Guinea) Violet Apisah	4	1
(Switzerland) Ylena In-Albon	6	6
WC	(United Kingdom) Gemma Heath	3	1
2	(United States) Whitney Osuigwe	6	6

Second round
8	(United Kingdom) E Appleton	4	4
(Russia) S Lansere	6	6
(United States) H Baptiste	2	2
9	(Colombia) C Osorio	6	6
(United States) C McNally	0	3
(United Kingdom) K Swan	6	6
(Switzerland) Y In-Albon	6	3	3
2	(United States) W Osuigwe	2	6	6

Third round
(Russia) S Lansere	7	6
9	(Colombia) C Osorio	5	1
(United Kingdom) K Swan	4	6	1
2	(United States) W Osuigwe	6	2	6

Quarterfinals
(Russia) S Lansere	7	6
2	(United States) W Osuigwe	5	3

== Qualifying ==
=== Seeds ===
1. (Germany) Jule Niemeier (qualified)
2. (Russia) Anzhelika Isaeva (first round)
3. (India) Mihika Yadav (first round)
4. (United States) Victoria Flores (qualified)
5. (Switzerland) Lulu Sun (qualified)
6. (Slovakia) Viktória Morvayová (qualifying competition)
7. (United States) Hurricane Tyra Black (qualified)
8. (Germany) Lara Schmidt (qualified)
9. (France) Yasmine Mansouri (first round)
10. (United States) Natasha Subhash (qualifying competition)
11. (Bulgaria) Gergana Topalova (first round)
12. (Papua New Guinea) Violet Apisah (qualified)
13. (Russia) Valeriya Deminova (qualifying competition)
14. (France) Clara Burel (qualifying competition)
15. (Russia) Ekaterina Vishnevskaya (first round)
16. (Norway) Malene Helgø (qualifying competition)

=== Qualifiers ===
1. (Germany) Jule Niemeier
2. (Papua New Guinea) Violet Apisah
3. (Poland) Maja Chwalińska
4. (United States) Victoria Flores
5. (Switzerland) Lulu Sun
6. (Finland) Oona Orpana
7. (United States) Hurricane Tyra Black
8. (Germany) Lara Schmidt

=== Draw ===
==== First qualifier ====
First round				Qualifying competition
				1	(Germany) Jule Niemeier	7^{7}	6
	(Switzerland) Sina Züger	1	2	10	(United States) Natasha Subhash	6^{5}	3
10	(United States) Natasha Subhash	6	6

==== Second qualifier ====
First round
2	(Russia) Anzhelika Isaeva	3	3
(Slovakia) Barbora Matúšová	6	6
(United Kingdom) Tzarina Tuen-Matthews	0	0
12	(Papua New Guinea) Violet Apisah	6	6

Qualifying competition
(Slovakia) Barbora Matúšová	1	4
12	(Papua New Guinea) Violet Apisah	6	6

==== Third qualifier ====
First round
3	(India) Mihika Yadav	2	4
WC	(United States) Cori Gauff	6	6
(Poland) Maja Chwalińska	6	6
15	(Russia) Ekaterina Vishnevskaya	0	1

Qualifying competition
WC	(United States) Cori Gauff	7^{7}	3	2
(Poland) Maja Chwalińska	6^{2}	6	6

==== Fourth qualifier ====
First round
4	(United States) Victoria Flores	6	6
(Chinese Taipei) Joanna Garland	3	3
(United Kingdom) Lily Ghodrati	0	0
16	(Norway) Malene Helgø	6	6

Qualifying competition
4	(United States) Victoria Flores	6	7
16	(Norway) Malene Helgø	4	5

==== Fifth qualifier ====
First round
5	(Switzerland) Lulu Sun	7	7
(Netherlands) Lexie Stevens	5	5
(Burundi) Sada Nahimana	1	6	9
9	(France) Yasmine Mansouri	6	4	7

Qualifying competition
5	(Switzerland) Lulu Sun	6	6
(Burundi) Sada Nahimana	2	2

==== Sixth qualifier ====
First round
6	(Slovakia) Viktória Morvayová	7	1	8
(United States) Alana Smith	5	6	6
(Finland) Oona Orpana	6	6
11	(Bulgaria) Gergana Topalova	2	2

Qualifying competition
6	(Slovakia) Viktória Morvayová	2	3
(Finland) Oona Orpana	6	6

==== Seventh qualifier ====
First round
7	(United States) Hurricane Tyra Black	6	6
(Argentina) Paula Barañano	3	4
(Japan) Anri Nagata	4	1
13	(Russia) Valeriya Deminova	6	6

Qualifying competition
7	(United States) Hurricane Tyra Black	6	3	6
13	(Russia) Valeriya Deminova	1	6	1

==== Eighth qualifier ====
First round
8	(Germany) Lara Schmidt	6	6
(United States) Salma Ewing	4	2
(United Kingdom) Maria Budin	4	2
14	(France) Clara Burel	6	6

Qualifying competition
8	(Germany) Lara Schmidt	6	6
14	(France) Clara Burel	3	4
