= 2017 Wimbledon Championships – Senior gentlemen's invitation doubles =

Senior gentlemen's invitation doubles
- 2017 Wimbledon Championships

Final
- Champions: (Netherlands) Jacco Eltingh (Netherlands) Paul Haarhuis
- Runners-up: (Netherlands) Richard Krajicek (United Kingdom) Mark Petchey
- Score: 4−6, 6−3, [10−6]

Events
Singles	men	women		boys	girls
Doubles	men	women	mixed	boys	girls
WC Singles	men	women	quad
WC Doubles	men	women	quad
Legends	men	women	seniors
← 2016 ·	Wimbledon Championships	· 2018 →

Todd Woodbridge and Mark Woodforde were the defending champions but were eliminated in the round robin.

Jacco Eltingh and Paul Haarhuis defeated Richard Krajicek and Mark Petchey in the final, 4−6, 6−3, [10−6] to win the senior gentlemen's invitation doubles tennis title at the 2017 Wimbledon Championships.

== Draw ==
=== Key ===
- Q = Qualifier
- WC = Wild card
- LL = Lucky loser
- Alt = Alternate
- ITF = ITF entry
- PR = Protected ranking
- SR = Special ranking
- SE = Special exempt
- JE = Junior exempt
- JR = Junior Accelerator Programme entrant
- CO = College Accelerator Programme entrant
- NG = Next Gen Accelerator Program entrant
- w/o = Walkover
- r = Retired
- d = Defaulted

=== Final ===
Final
(Netherlands) Richard Krajicek (United Kingdom) Mark Petchey	6	3	[6]
(Netherlands) Jacco Eltingh (Netherlands) Paul Haarhuis	4	6	[10]

=== Group A ===
		(United Kingdom) Bates (United Kingdom) Wilkinson	(South Africa) Ferreira (Croatia) Ivanišević	(Netherlands) Krajicek (United Kingdom) Petchey	(Australia) Woodbridge (Australia) Woodforde	RR; W–L	Set; W–L	Game; W–L	Standings
A1	(United Kingdom) Jeremy Bates (United Kingdom) Chris Wilkinson		4–6, 6–2, [12–10]	4–6, 3–6	5–7, 6–7^{(1-7)}	1–2	2–5	29–34	4
A2	(South Africa) Wayne Ferreira (Croatia) Goran Ivanišević	6–4, 2–6, [10–12]		3–6, 6–4, [4–10]	6–2, 7–5	1–2	4–4	30–29	2
A3	(Netherlands) Richard Krajicek (United Kingdom) Mark Petchey	6–4, 6–3	6–3, 4–6, [10–4]		6–1, 6–7^{(6–8)}, [10–7]	3–0	6–2	36–24	1
A4	(Australia) Todd Woodbridge (Australia) Mark Woodforde	7–5, 7–6^{(7–1)}	2–6, 5–7	1–6, 7–6^{(8–6)}, [7–10]		1–2	3–4	29–37	3

Standings are determined by: 1. number of wins; 2. number of matches; 3. in two-players-ties, head-to-head records; 4. in three-players-ties, percentage of sets won, or of games won; 5. steering-committee decision.

=== Group B ===
		(United Kingdom) Castle (United States) Chang	(Netherlands) Eltingh (Netherlands) Haarhuis	(France) Leconte (France) Pioline	(United States) McEnroe (United States) Tarango	RR; W–L	Set; W–L	Game; W–L	Standings
B1	(United Kingdom) Andrew Castle (United States) Michael Chang		4–6, 4–6	6–7^{(4–7)}, 6–2, [7–10]	7–5 6–3	1–2	3–4	33–30	3
B2	(Netherlands) Jacco Eltingh (Netherlands) Paul Haarhuis	6–4, 6–4		6–3, 6–4	4–6, 6–3, [10–5]	3–0	6–1	35–24	1
B3	(France) Henri Leconte (France) Cédric Pioline	7–6^{(7–4)}, 2–6, [10–7]	3–6, 4–6		6–7^{(3–7)}, 6–2, [12–10]	2–1	4–4	30–33	2
B4	(United States) Patrick McEnroe (United States) Jeff Tarango	5–7, 3–6	6–4, 3–6, [5–10]	7–6^{(7–3)}, 2–6, [10–12]		0–3	2–6	26–37	4

Standings are determined by: 1. number of wins; 2. number of matches; 3. in two-players-ties, head-to-head records; 4. in three-players-ties, percentage of sets won, or of games won; 5. steering-committee decision.
