= 2017 Wimbledon Championships – Wheelchair men's singles =

Wheelchair men's singles
- 2017 Wimbledon Championships

Final
- Champions: (Sweden) Stefan Olsson
- Runners-up: (Argentina) Gustavo Fernández
- Score: 7−5, 3−6, 7−5

Events
Singles	men	women		boys	girls
Doubles	men	women	mixed	boys	girls
WC Singles	men	women	quad
WC Doubles	men	women	quad
Legends	men	women	seniors
← 2016 ·	Wimbledon Championships	· 2018 →

Stefan Olsson defeated Gustavo Fernández in the final, 7−5, 3−6, 7−5 to win the wheelchair gentlemen's singles tennis title at the 2017 Wimbledon Championships.

Gordon Reid was the defending champion, but was defeated in the quarterfinals by Olsson.

== Seeds ==
1. (United Kingdom) Gordon Reid (quarterfinals)
2. (Argentina) Gustavo Fernández (final)

== Draw ==
=== Key ===
- Q = Qualifier
- WC = Wild card
- LL = Lucky loser
- Alt = Alternate
- ITF = ITF entry
- PR = Protected ranking
- SR = Special ranking
- SE = Special exempt
- JE = Junior exempt
- JR = Junior Accelerator Programme entrant
- CO = College Accelerator Programme entrant
- NG = Next Gen Accelerator Program entrant
- w/o = Walkover
- r = Retired
- d = Defaulted

=== Finals ===
Quarterfinals
1	(United Kingdom) Gordon Reid	2	3
(Sweden) Stefan Olsson	6	6
WC	(Japan) Shingo Kunieda	6	6
(Netherlands) Maikel Scheffers	3	2
(United Kingdom) Alfie Hewett	4	6	6
(France) Nicolas Peifer	6	2	2
(France) Stéphane Houdet	2	4
2	(Argentina) Gustavo Fernández	6	6

Semifinals
(Sweden) Stefan Olsson	6	6
WC	(Japan) Shingo Kunieda	4	2
(United Kingdom) Alfie Hewett	6	6^{4}	3
2	(Argentina) Gustavo Fernández	4	7^{7}	6

Final
(Sweden) Stefan Olsson	7	3	7
2	(Argentina) Gustavo Fernández	5	6	5
