= 2018 Glasgow Trophy =

- Date: 28 April – 6 May
- Edition: 1st
- Draw: 32S / 16D
- Surface: Hard (indoor)
- Location: Glasgow, United Kingdom
- Venue: Scotstoun Leisure Centre

Champions

Singles
- (Slovakia) Lukáš Lacko

Doubles
- (Spain) Gerard Granollers / (Spain) Guillermo Olaso
Glasgow Trophy	· 2019 →

The 2018 Glasgow Trophy was a professional tennis tournament played on indoor hard courts. It was the first edition of the tournament which was part of the 2018 ATP Challenger Tour. It took place in Glasgow, United Kingdom, between 28 April and 6 May 2018.

== Singles main-draw entrants ==
=== Seeds ===
Country	Player	Rank^{1}	Seed
SVK	Lukáš Lacko	105	1
SRB	Nikola Milojević	203	2
FRA	David Guez	266	3
ITA	Matteo Viola	267	4
ESP	Bernabé Zapata Miralles	284	5
JPN	Kaichi Uchida	292	6
CZE	Marek Jaloviec	299	7
AUT	Lucas Miedler	302	8

^{1} Rankings are as of 23 April 2018.

=== Other entrants ===
The following players received wildcards into the singles main draw:

- (United Kingdom) Lloyd Glasspool
- (United Kingdom) Jonathan Gray
- (United Kingdom) Aidan McHugh
- (United Kingdom) James Ward

The following player received entry into the singles main draw using a protected rating:

- (Italy) Riccardo Bellotti

The following players received entry from the qualifying draw:

- (Germany) Daniel Brands
- (United Kingdom) Dan Evans
- (Finland) Harri Heliövaara
- (Germany) Robin Kern

== Champions ==
=== Singles ===
- (Slovakia) Lukáš Lacko def. (Italy) Luca Vanni 4–6, 7–6^{(7–3)}, 6–4.

=== Doubles ===
- (Spain) Gerard Granollers / (Spain) Guillermo Olaso def. (United Kingdom) Scott Clayton / (United Kingdom) Jonny O'Mara 6–1, 7–5,
