= 2019 Murray Trophy – Glasgow – Doubles =

Glasgow – Doubles
- 2019 Murray Trophy – Glasgow

Final
- Champions: (Belgium) Ruben Bemelmans (Germany) Daniel Masur
- Runners-up: (United Kingdom) Jamie Murray (Australia) John-Patrick Smith
- Score: 4–6, 6–3, [10–8]

Events
Singles	Doubles
← 2018 ·	Murray Trophy – Glasgow	· 2020 →

Gerard Granollers and Guillermo Olaso were the defending champions but chose not to defend their title.

Ruben Bemelmans and Daniel Masur won the title after defeating Jamie Murray and John-Patrick Smith 4–6, 6–3, [10–8] in the final.

== Seeds ==
1. (United Kingdom) Jamie Murray / (Australia) John-Patrick Smith (final)
2. (United States) Nathaniel Lammons / (Croatia) Antonio Šančić (semifinals)
3. (Sweden) André Göransson / (Netherlands) Sem Verbeek (first round)
4. (Poland) Karol Drzewiecki / (Poland) Szymon Walków (quarterfinals)

== Draw ==
=== Key ===
- Q = Qualifier
- WC = Wild card
- LL = Lucky loser
- Alt = Alternate
- ITF = ITF entry
- PR = Protected ranking
- SR = Special ranking
- SE = Special exempt
- JE = Junior exempt
- JR = Junior Accelerator Programme entrant
- CO = College Accelerator Programme entrant
- NG = Next Gen Accelerator Program entrant
- w/o = Walkover
- r = Retired
- d = Defaulted

First round
1	(United Kingdom) J Murray (Australia) J-P Smith	6	6
WC	(United Kingdom) Marshall Tutu (United Kingdom) David Wright	4	2
Alt	(Turkey) A Çelikbilek (Turkey) C İlkel	7^{7}	7^{8}
(Finland) H Heliövaara (Finland) E Ruusuvuori	6^{5}	6^{6}
4	(Poland) K Drzewiecki (Poland) S Walków	3	6	[10]
WC	(United Kingdom) L Johnson (United Kingdom) M Whitehouse	6	3	[3]
(Czech Republic) M Gengel (India) R Ramanathan	7	7^{9}
(United Kingdom) S Clayton (United Kingdom) L Glasspool	5	6^{7}
(Spain) N Kuhn (Austria) J Rodionov	w/o
(France) G Blancaneaux (France) A Rinderknech
(Belgium) R Bemelmans (Germany) D Masur	7^{7}	6
3	(Sweden) A Göransson (Netherlands) S Verbeek	6^{2}	4
(Italy) J Ocleppo (Spain) R Ortega Olmedo	6^{4}	5
(France) Q Halys (France) M Martineau	7^{7}	7
(Philippines) R Gonzales (Sweden) A Siljeström	4	6^{3}
2	(United States) N Lammons (Croatia) A Šančić	6	7^{7}

Quarterfinals
1	(United Kingdom) J Murray (Australia) J-P Smith	6	6
Alt	(Turkey) A Çelikbilek (Turkey) C İlkel	3	4
4	(Poland) K Drzewiecki (Poland) S Walków	4	6	[3]
(Czech Republic) M Gengel (India) R Ramanathan	6	3	[10]
(Spain) N Kuhn (Austria) J Rodionov
(Belgium) R Bemelmans (Germany) D Masur	w/o
(France) Q Halys (France) M Martineau	4	2
2	(United States) N Lammons (Croatia) A Šančić	6	6

Semifinals
1	(United Kingdom) J Murray (Australia) J-P Smith	6	6
(Czech Republic) M Gengel (India) R Ramanathan	2	3
(Belgium) R Bemelmans (Germany) D Masur	6	4	[11]
2	(United States) N Lammons (Croatia) A Šančić	4	6	[9]

Final
1	(United Kingdom) J Murray (Australia) J-P Smith	6	3	[8]
(Belgium) R Bemelmans (Germany) D Masur	4	6	[10]
