= 2018 Glasgow Trophy – Doubles =

Doubles
- 2018 Glasgow Trophy

Final
- Champions: (Spain) Gerard Granollers (Spain) Guillermo Olaso
- Runners-up: (United Kingdom) Scott Clayton (United Kingdom) Jonny O'Mara
- Score: 6–1, 7–5

Events
Singles	Doubles
Glasgow Trophy	· 2019 →

This was the first edition of the tournament.

Gerard Granollers and Guillermo Olaso won the title after defeating Scott Clayton and Jonny O'Mara 6–1, 7–5 in the final.

== Seeds ==
1. (United Kingdom) Scott Clayton / (United Kingdom) Jonny O'Mara (final)
2. (Spain) Roberto Ortega Olmedo / (Spain) Mario Vilella Martínez (first round)
3. (Italy) Alessandro Bega / (Austria) Lucas Miedler (quarterfinals)
4. (Finland) Harri Heliövaara / (Russia) Evgeny Karlovskiy (semifinals)

== Draw ==
=== Key ===
- Q = Qualifier
- WC = Wild card
- LL = Lucky loser
- Alt = Alternate
- SE = Special exempt
- PR = Protected ranking
- ITF = ITF entry
- JE = Junior exempt
- w/o = Walkover
- r = Retired
- d = Defaulted
- SR = Special ranking

First round
1	(United Kingdom) S Clayton (United Kingdom) J O'Mara	6^{7}	6	[10]
(Japan) H Moriya (Japan) K Uchida	7^{9}	2	[5]
PR	(United Kingdom) L Glasspool (United Kingdom) J Ward	6^{5}	6	[6]
PR	(United States) JP Fruttero (Netherlands) I Sijsling	7^{7}	2	[10]
3	(Italy) A Bega (Austria) L Miedler	3	7^{9}	[10]
WC	(United Kingdom) J Fearnley (United Kingdom) C Thomson	6	6^{7}	[6]
(Czech Republic) Marek Jaloviec (Spain) B Zapata Miralles	1	1
(France) D Guez (Belgium) Y Mertens	6	6
(Serbia) N Milojević (Italy) L Vanni	3	6	[10]
Alt	(Germany) D Brands (Germany) R Kern	6	3	[4]
WC	(United Kingdom) Reuben Henry (United Kingdom) Scott MacAulay	2	2
4	(Finland) H Heliövaara (Russia) E Karlovskiy	6	6
(United States) JC Aragone (United States) Jared Hiltzik	4	6	[5]
WC	(United Kingdom) S Duncan (United Kingdom) Kieran MacArty	6	2	[10]
(Spain) G Granollers (Spain) G Olaso	7	6
2	(Spain) R Ortega Olmedo (Spain) M Vilella Martínez	5	3

Quarterfinals
1	(United Kingdom) S Clayton (United Kingdom) J O'Mara	6	6
PR	(United States) JP Fruttero (Netherlands) I Sijsling	4	2
3	(Italy) A Bega (Austria) L Miedler	6^{5}	6	[5]
(France) D Guez (Belgium) Y Mertens	7^{7}	1	[10]
(Serbia) N Milojević (Italy) L Vanni	3	6^{2}
4	(Finland) H Heliövaara (Russia) E Karlovskiy	6	7^{7}
WC	(United Kingdom) S Duncan (United Kingdom) K MacArty	5	4
(Spain) G Granollers (Spain) G Olaso	7	6

Semifinals
1	(United Kingdom) S Clayton (United Kingdom) J O'Mara	6	6
(France) D Guez (Belgium) Y Mertens	3	2
4	(Finland) H Heliövaara (Russia) E Karlovskiy	3	4
(Spain) G Granollers (Spain) G Olaso	6	6

Final
1	(United Kingdom) S Clayton (United Kingdom) J O'Mara	1	5
(Spain) G Granollers (Spain) G Olaso	6	7
