= 2018 CDMX Open =

- Date: 9–15 April
- Edition: 1st
- Surface: Clay
- Location: Mexico City, Mexico

Champions

Singles
- (Argentina) Juan Ignacio Londero

Doubles
- (Germany) Yannick Hanfmann / (Germany) Kevin Krawietz
CDMX Open

The 2018 CDMX Open was a professional tennis tournament played on clay courts. It was the first edition of the tournament which was part of the 2018 ATP Challenger Tour. It took place in Mexico City, Mexico between 9 and 15 April 2018.

== Singles main-draw entrants ==
=== Seeds ===
Country	Player	Rank^{1}	Seed
GER	Yannick Hanfmann	121	1
BRA	Thiago Monteiro	125	2
ARG	Carlos Berlocq	131	3
ESP	Adrián Menéndez Maceiras	140	4
GER	Mats Moraing	156	5
DOM	Víctor Estrella Burgos	160	6
ESA	Marcelo Arévalo	175	7
SRB	Peđa Krstin	206	8

- ^{1} Rankings are as of 2 April 2018.

=== Other entrants ===
The following players received wildcards into the singles main draw:

- (Mexico) Lucas Gómez
- (United States) Sebastian Korda
- (Mexico) Luis Patiño
- (Mexico) Manuel Sánchez

The following player received entry into the singles main draw as a special exempt:

- (Argentina) Carlos Berlocq

The following players received entry from the qualifying draw:

- (Italy) Andrea Basso
- (Dominican Republic) José Hernández-Fernández
- (United States) Austin Krajicek
- (Argentina) Juan Ignacio Londero

== Champions ==
=== Singles ===
- (Argentina) Juan Ignacio Londero def. (Ecuador) Roberto Quiroz 6–1, 6–3.

=== Doubles ===
- (Germany) Yannick Hanfmann / (Germany) Kevin Krawietz def. (United Kingdom) Luke Bambridge / (United Kingdom) Jonny O'Mara 6–2, 7–6^{(7–3)}.
