= 2019 Murray Trophy – Glasgow – Singles =

Glasgow – Singles
- 2019 Murray Trophy – Glasgow

Final
- Champion: (Finland) Emil Ruusuvuori
- Runner-up: (France) Alexandre Müller
- Score: 6–3, 6–1

Events
Singles	Doubles
- Murray Trophy – Glasgow

Lukáš Lacko was the defending champion but chose not to defend his title.

Emil Ruusuvuori won the title after defeating Alexandre Müller 6–3, 6–1 in the final.

== Seeds ==
All seeds receive a bye into the second round.

1. (Tunisia) Malek Jaziri (third round)
2. (Austria) Dennis Novak (withdrew)
3. (France) Quentin Halys (third round)
4. (Finland) Emil Ruusuvuori (champion)
5. (India) Ramkumar Ramanathan (semifinals)
6. (Italy) Roberto Marcora (quarterfinals)
7. (Spain) Nicola Kuhn (quarterfinals)
8. (Belgium) Ruben Bemelmans (second round)
9. (Germany) Tobias Kamke (quarterfinals)
10. (Bosnia and Herzegovina) Mirza Bašić (third round)
11. (Spain) Roberto Ortega Olmedo (second round)
12. (Australia) John-Patrick Smith (second round)
13. (France) Mathias Bourgue (third round)
14. (Germany) Daniel Masur (quarterfinals)
15. (Turkey) Cem İlkel (third round)
16. (France) Alexandre Müller (final)
17. (Austria) Jurij Rodionov (semifinals)

== Draw ==
Key

- Q = Qualifier
- WC = Wild card
- LL = Lucky loser
- Alt = Alternate
- ITF = ITF entry
- PR = Protected ranking
- SR = Special ranking
- SE = Special exempt
- JE = Junior exempt
- JR = Junior Accelerator Programme entrant
- CO = College Accelerator Programme entrant
- NG = Next Gen Accelerator Program entrant
- w/o = Walkover
- r = Retired
- d = Defaulted

=== Finals ===
Quarterfinals
16	(France) Alexandre Müller	3	7	6
7	(Spain) Nicola Kuhn	6	5	4
14	(Germany) Daniel Masur	5	6^{4}
5	(India) Ramkumar Ramanathan	7	7^{7}
9	(Germany) Tobias Kamke	2	1
4	(Finland) Emil Ruusuvuori	6	6
6	(Italy) Roberto Marcora	2	2
17	(Austria) Jurij Rodionov	6	6

Semifinals
16	(France) Alexandre Müller	7	1	6
5	(India) Ramkumar Ramanathan	5	6	4
4	(Finland) Emil Ruusuvuori	6	6
17	(Austria) Jurij Rodionov	1	3

Final
16	(France) Alexandre Müller	3	1
4	(Finland) Emil Ruusuvuori	6	6

=== Top half ===
==== Section 1 ====
First round
WC	(United Kingdom) F Gill	2	0
(Italy) J Ocleppo	6	6
(United Kingdom) E Hoyt	4	6^{1}
PR	(Austria) M Neuchrist	6	7^{7}
(France) H Grenier	3	7	2
LL	(Poland) K Drzewiecki	6	5	6
(United Kingdom) L Glasspool	6	6
(Italy) Riccardo Balzerani	3	2

Second round
1	(Tunisia) M Jaziri	7^{7}	6
(Italy) J Ocleppo	6^{0}	3
PR	(Austria) M Neuchrist	6	4	1
16	(France) A Müller	4	6	6
10	(Bosnia and Herzegovina) M Bašić	6	6
LL	(Poland) K Drzewiecki	4	3
(United Kingdom) L Glasspool	6	4	3
7	(Spain) N Kuhn	3	6	6

Third round
1	(Tunisia) M Jaziri	3	1
16	(France) A Müller	6	6
10	(Bosnia and Herzegovina) M Bašić	3	4
7	(Spain) N Kuhn	6	6

Quarterfinals
16	(France) A Müller	3	7	6
7	(Spain) N Kuhn	6	5	4

==== Section 2 ====
First round
(France) A Rinderknech	7^{12}	6
WC	(United Kingdom) A McHugh	6^{10}	3
(Italy) A Bega	3	6	3
(France) E Furness	6	3	6
(Czech Republic) T Macháč	4	3
(Netherlands) B van de Zandschulp	6	6
(United Kingdom) J Draper	7^{7}	4	2
(Turkey) A Çelikbilek	6^{5}	6	6

Second round
3	(France) Q Halys	7^{8}	0
(France) A Rinderknech	6^{6}	0^{r}
(France) E Furness	4	3
14	(Germany) D Masur	6	6
11	(Spain) R Ortega Olmedo	0	0
(Netherlands) B van de Zandschulp	6	6
(Turkey) A Çelikbilek	4	2
5	(India) R Ramanathan	6	6

Third round
3	(France) Q Halys	6^{5}	6^{4}
14	(Germany) D Masur	7^{7}	7^{7}
(Netherlands) B van de Zandschulp	4	1
5	(India) R Ramanathan	6	6

Quarterfinals
14	(Germany) D Masur	5	6^{4}
5	(India) R Ramanathan	7	7^{7}

=== Bottom half ===
==== Section 3 ====
First round
WC	(United Kingdom) M Whitehouse	5	2
(France) A Escoffier	7	6
(Germany) J Härteis	6	6
Q	(United Kingdom) S Duncan	3	3
(Germany) B Hassan	4	1
(Italy) L Vanni	6	6
Q	(Sweden) J Mridha	7^{9}	6
WC	(United Kingdom) H Wendelken	6^{7}	3

Second round
8	(Belgium) R Bemelmans	4	4
(France) A Escoffier	6	6
(Germany) J Härteis	3	4
9	(Germany) T Kamke	6	6
15	(Turkey) C İlkel	6^{10}	6	6
(Italy) L Vanni	7^{12}	2	0
Q	(Sweden) J Mridha	5	6	3
4	(Finland) E Ruusuvuori	7	4	6

Third round
(France) A Escoffier	2	2
9	(Germany) T Kamke	6	6
15	(Turkey) C İlkel	3	2
4	(Finland) E Ruusuvuori	6	6

Quarterfinals
9	(Germany) T Kamke	2	1
4	(Finland) E Ruusuvuori	6	6

==== Section 4 ====
First round
WC	(United Kingdom) L Johnson	1	6	7^{7}
Alt	(Netherlands) S Verbeek	6	3	6^{2}
(France) Quentin Robert	4	2
(Norway) V Durasovic	6	6
(France) M Martineau	6^{2}	2
(Slovakia) L Klein	7^{7}	6
Alt	(Finland) H Heliövaara	2	6	3
(France) G Blancaneaux	6	3	6

Second round
6	(Italy) R Marcora	7^{7}	6
WC	(United Kingdom) L Johnson	6^{3}	0
(Norway) V Durasovic	6	6
12	(Australia) J-P Smith	1	4
13	(France) M Bourgue	7	3	7^{7}
(Slovakia) L Klein	5	6	6^{2}
(France) G Blancaneaux	6	4	4
17	(Austria) J Rodionov	2	6	6

Third round
6	(Italy) R Marcora	7^{7}	6
(Norway) V Durasovic	6^{5}	2
13	(France) M Bourgue	4	7^{7}	3
17	(Austria) J Rodionov	6	6^{4}	6

Quarterfinals
6	(Italy) R Marcora	2	2
17	(Austria) J Rodionov	6	6
