= 2018 Glasgow Trophy – Singles =

Singles
- 2018 Glasgow Trophy

Final
- Champion: (Slovakia) Lukáš Lacko
- Runner-up: (Italy) Luca Vanni
- Score: 4–6, 7–6^{(7–3)}, 6–4

Events
| Singles | Doubles |
- Glasgow Trophy

This was the first edition of the tournament.

Lukáš Lacko won the title after defeating Luca Vanni 4–6, 7–6^{(7–3)}, 6–4 in the final.

== Seeds ==
1. (Slovakia) Lukáš Lacko (champion)
2. (Serbia) Nikola Milojević (second round)
3. (France) David Guez (semifinals)
4. (Italy) Matteo Viola (semifinals)
5. (Spain) Bernabé Zapata Miralles (first round)
6. (Japan) Kaichi Uchida (first round)
7. (Czech Republic) Marek Jaloviec (first round)
8. (Austria) Lucas Miedler (second round)

== Draw ==
Key

- Q = Qualifier
- WC = Wild card
- LL = Lucky loser
- Alt = Alternate
- ITF = ITF entry
- PR = Protected ranking
- SR = Special ranking
- SE = Special exempt
- JE = Junior exempt
- JR = Junior Accelerator Programme entrant
- CO = College Accelerator Programme entrant
- NG = Next Gen Accelerator Program entrant
- w/o = Walkover
- r = Retired
- d = Defaulted

=== Finals ===
Semifinals
1 | (Slovakia) Lukáš Lacko | 6 | 6
3 | (France) David Guez | 3 | 4
4 | (Italy) Matteo Viola | 2 | 2
(Italy) Luca Vanni | 6 | 6

Final
1 | (Slovakia) Lukáš Lacko | 4 | 7^{7} | 6
(Italy) Luca Vanni | 6 | 6^{3} | 4

=== Top half ===
First round
1 | (Slovakia) L Lacko | 6 | 6
(Belgium) J De Loore | 4 | 4
(Belgium) Y Mertens | 4 | 6 | 6^{3}
(Japan) H Moriya | 6 | 3 | 7^{7}
(Russia) E Karlovskiy | 6^{5} | 3
(Spain) G Olaso | 7^{7} | 6
WC | (United Kingdom) L Glasspool | 6 | 6
7 | (Czech Republic) Marek Jaloviec | 3 | 2
3 | (France) D Guez | 7^{7} | 6
WC | (United Kingdom) A McHugh | 6^{5} | 3
(Italy) A Bega | 1 | 3
Q | (Germany) R Kern | 6 | 6
(United States) Jared Hiltzik | 3 | 4
Q | (Germany) D Brands | 6 | 6
Q | (United Kingdom) D Evans | 6 | 2 | 4
8 | (Austria) L Miedler | 2 | 6 | 6

Second round
1 | (Slovakia) L Lacko | 6 | 6
(Japan) H Moriya | 1 | 4
(Spain) G Olaso | 6 | 6
WC | (United Kingdom) L Glasspool | 4 | 3
3 | (France) D Guez | 4 | 7^{7} | 6
Q | (Germany) R Kern | 6 | 6^{5} | 4
Q | (Germany) D Brands | 6 | 6
8 | (Austria) L Miedler | 1 | 3

Quarterfinals
1 | (Slovakia) L Lacko | 6 | 6
(Spain) G Olaso | 2 | 3
3 | (France) D Guez | 6 | 5 | 6
Q | (Germany) D Brands | 4 | 7 | 2

Semifinals
1 | (Slovakia) L Lacko | 6 | 6
3 | (France) D Guez | 3 | 4

=== Bottom half ===
First round
6 | (Japan) K Uchida | 4 | 6^{4}
WC | (United Kingdom) J Ward | 6 | 7^{7}
Q | (Finland) H Heliövaara | 6 | 6
WC | (United Kingdom) Jonathan Gray | 3 | 1
(Italy) G Mager | 5 | 3
(United States) JC Aragone | 7 | 6
PR | (Italy) R Bellotti | 1 | 2
4 | (Italy) M Viola | 6 | 6
5 | (Spain) B Zapata Miralles | 1 | 3
(Netherlands) I Sijsling | 6 | 6
(Spain) M Vilella Martínez | 6^{6} | 4
(Spain) R Ortega Olmedo | 7^{8} | 6
(Italy) L Vanni | 6 | 7^{7}
(France) Y Jankovits | 3 | 6^{4}
(Spain) G Granollers | 6^{4} | 2
2 | (Serbia) N Milojević | 7^{7} | 6

Second round
WC | (United Kingdom) J Ward | 5 | 4
Q | (Finland) H Heliövaara | 7 | 6
(United States) JC Aragone | 4 | 6 | 1
4 | (Italy) M Viola | 6 | 3 | 6
(Netherlands) I Sijsling | 6 | 6^{3} | 6^{4}
(Spain) R Ortega Olmedo | 1 | 7^{7} | 7^{7}
(Italy) L Vanni | 6 | 6^{4} | 7^{7}
2 | (Serbia) N Milojević | 4 | 7^{7} | 6^{4}

Quarterfinals
Q | (Finland) H Heliövaara | 7 | 2 | 5
4 | (Italy) M Viola | 5 | 6 | 7
(Spain) R Ortega Olmedo | 3 | 2
(Italy) L Vanni | 6 | 6

Semifinals
4 | (Italy) M Viola | 2 | 2
(Italy) L Vanni | 6 | 6
