= 2018 CDMX Open – Doubles =

Doubles
- 2018 CDMX Open

Final
- Champions: (Germany) Yannick Hanfmann (Germany) Kevin Krawietz
- Runners-up: (United Kingdom) Luke Bambridge (United Kingdom) Jonny O'Mara
- Score: 6–2, 7–6^{(7–3)}

Events
Singles	Doubles
- CDMX Open

This was the first edition of the tournament.

Yannick Hanfmann and Kevin Krawietz won the title after defeating Luke Bambridge and Jonny O'Mara 6–2, 7–6^{(7–3)} in the final.

== Seeds ==
1. (El Salvador) Marcelo Arévalo / (Mexico) Miguel Ángel Reyes-Varela (first round)
2. (Australia) Bradley Mousley / (India) Jeevan Nedunchezhiyan (first round)
3. (United Kingdom) Luke Bambridge / (United Kingdom) Jonny O'Mara (final)
4. (Peru) Sergio Galdós / (Spain) Adrián Menéndez Maceiras (semifinals)

== Draw ==
Key

- Q = Qualifier
- WC = Wild card
- LL = Lucky loser
- Alt = Alternate
- ITF = ITF entry
- PR = Protected ranking
- SR = Special ranking
- SE = Special exempt
- JE = Junior exempt
- JR = Junior Accelerator Programme entrant
- CO = College Accelerator Programme entrant
- NG = Next Gen Accelerator Program entrant
- w/o = Walkover
- r = Retired
- d = Defaulted

First round
1	(El Salvador) M Arévalo (Mexico) MÁ Reyes-Varela	0	3
(Venezuela) R Maytín (Ecuador) R Quiroz	6	6
WC	(Argentina) F Bagnis (Mexico) H Hach Verdugo	6	7^{7}
(United States) N Pasha (Brazil) F Romboli	4	6^{4}
3	(United Kingdom) L Bambridge (United Kingdom) J O'Mara	6	6
WC	(Ecuador) G Escobar (Mexico) L Patiño	2	3
WC	(United States) S Korda (Colombia) N Mejía	7	2	[10]
(United States) R Galloway (United States) A Krajicek	5	6	[4]
(Serbia) P Krstin (Germany) M Moraing	2	6	[5]
PR	(Mexico) C Ramírez (Bolivia) F Zeballos	6	2	[10]
(United States) N Lammons (United States) A Lawson	6	3	[5]
4	(Peru) S Galdós (Spain) A Menéndez Maceiras	4	6	[10]
PR	(Colombia) N Barrientos (Colombia) S Giraldo	0	2
(Germany) Y Hanfmann (Germany) K Krawietz	6	6
Alt	(Argentina) F Agamenone (Venezuela) LD Martínez	2	6	[13]
2	(Australia) B Mousley (India) J Nedunchezhiyan	6	4	[11]

Quarterfinals
(Venezuela) R Maytín (Ecuador) R Quiroz	3	2
WC	(Argentina) F Bagnis (Mexico) H Hach Verdugo	6	6
3	(United Kingdom) L Bambridge (United Kingdom) J O'Mara	7^{9}	6
WC	(United States) S Korda (Colombia) N Mejía	6^{7}	1
PR	(Mexico) C Ramírez (Bolivia) F Zeballos	3	5
4	(Peru) S Galdós (Spain) A Menéndez Maceiras	6	7
(Germany) Y Hanfmann (Germany) K Krawietz	6	6
Alt	(Argentina) F Agamenone (Venezuela) LD Martínez	4	3

Semifinals
WC	(Argentina) F Bagnis (Mexico) H Hach Verdugo	4	6	[9]
3	(United Kingdom) L Bambridge (United Kingdom) J O'Mara	6	3	[11]
4	(Peru) S Galdós (Spain) A Menéndez Maceiras	3	2
(Germany) Y Hanfmann (Germany) K Krawietz	6	6

Final
3	(United Kingdom) L Bambridge (United Kingdom) J O'Mara	2	6^{3}
(Germany) Y Hanfmann (Germany) K Krawietz	6	7^{7}
