= 2018 CDMX Open – Singles =

Singles
- 2018 CDMX Open

Final
- Champion: (Argentina) Juan Ignacio Londero
- Runner-up: (Ecuador) Roberto Quiroz
- Score: 6–1, 6–3

Events
Singles	Doubles
CDMX Open

This was the first edition of the tournament.

Juan Ignacio Londero won the title after defeating Roberto Quiroz 6–1, 6–3 in the final.

== Seeds ==
1. (Germany) Yannick Hanfmann (first round)
2. (Brazil) Thiago Monteiro (second round)
3. (Argentina) Carlos Berlocq (second round)
4. (Spain) Adrián Menéndez Maceiras (quarterfinals)
5. (Germany) Mats Moraing (second round)
6. (Dominican Republic) Víctor Estrella Burgos (second round)
7. (El Salvador) Marcelo Arévalo (second round)
8. (Serbia) Peđa Krstin (second round)

== Draw ==
=== Key ===
- Q = Qualifier
- WC = Wild card
- LL = Lucky loser
- Alt = Alternate
- SE = Special exempt
- PR = Protected ranking
- ITF = ITF entry
- JE = Junior exempt
- w/o = Walkover
- r = Retired
- d = Defaulted
- SR = Special ranking

=== Finals ===
Semifinals
(Ecuador) Roberto Quiroz	3	6	6
(Argentina) Facundo Argüello	6	0	3
(Colombia) Daniel Elahi Galán	4	7	4
Q	(Argentina) Juan Ignacio Londero	6	5	6

Final
(Ecuador) Roberto Quiroz	1	3
Q	(Argentina) Juan Ignacio Londero	6	6

=== Top half ===
First round
1	(Germany) Y Hanfmann	2	3
(United Kingdom) J Clarke	6	6
Q	(Italy) A Basso	6^{2}	6	6
(Spain) D Muñoz de la Nava	7^{7}	4	1
(Ecuador) R Quiroz	6	6
(Bosnia and Herzegovina) A Šetkić	1	3
(Serbia) D Petrović	3	6	4
8	(Serbia) P Krstin	6	1	6
3/SE	(Argentina) C Berlocq	3	6	6
WC	(United States) S Korda	6	1	4
(Russia) I Nedelko	6	3	2
(Germany) J Choinski	3	6	6
WC	(Mexico) L Gómez	3	4
(Argentina) F Argüello	6	6
(Colombia) S Giraldo	4	7	2
5	(Germany) M Moraing	6	5	6

Second round
(United Kingdom) J Clarke	4	4
Q	(Italy) A Basso	6	6
(Ecuador) R Quiroz	4	6	6
8	(Serbia) P Krstin	6	1	4
3/SE	(Argentina) C Berlocq	3	4
(Germany) J Choinski	6	6
(Argentina) F Argüello	2	6	6
5	(Germany) M Moraing	6	4	4

Quarterfinals
Q	(Italy) A Basso	5	6^{4}
(Ecuador) R Quiroz	7	7^{7}
(Germany) J Choinski	5	2
(Argentina) F Argüello	7	6

Semifinals
(Ecuador) R Quiroz	3	6	6
(Argentina) F Argüello	6	0	3

=== Bottom half ===
First round
6	(Dominican Republic) V Estrella Burgos	6	4	7^{7}
(Argentina) F Bagnis	4	6	6^{3}
(Colombia) DE Galán	6	6
(Spain) B Zapata Miralles	3	4
(Brazil) J Souza	7^{7}	7
(Brazil) G Clezar	6^{2}	5
(Belgium) Christopher Heyman	6	5	2
4	(Spain) A Menéndez Maceiras	1	7	6
7	(El Salvador) M Arévalo	6	6
WC	(Mexico) L Patiño	3	2
Q	(Dominican Republic) J Hernández-Fernández	6	3	6
(Australia) B Mousley	2	6	3
Q	(Argentina) JI Londero	7	6
Q	(United States) A Krajicek	5	1
WC	(Mexico) M Sánchez	3	3
2	(Brazil) T Monteiro	6	6

Second round
6	(Dominican Republic) V Estrella Burgos	6	6^{5}	2
(Colombia) DE Galán	4	7^{7}	6
(Brazil) J Souza	4	6	3
4	(Spain) A Menéndez Maceiras	6	2	6
7	(El Salvador) M Arévalo	7^{7}	6^{8}	4
Q	(Dominican Republic) J Hernández-Fernández	6^{3}	7^{10}	6
Q	(Argentina) JI Londero	6	6
2	(Brazil) T Monteiro	4	1

Quarterfinals
(Colombia) DE Galán	7^{7}	6
4	(Spain) A Menéndez Maceiras	6^{5}	4
Q	(Dominican Republic) J Hernández-Fernández	5	2
Q	(Argentina) JI Londero	7	6

Semifinals
(Colombia) DE Galán	4	7	4
Q	(Argentina) JI Londero	6	5	6
