= 2017 Wimbledon Championships – Women's doubles =

Women's doubles
- 2017 Wimbledon Championships

Final
- Champions: (Russia) Ekaterina Makarova (Russia) Elena Vesnina
- Runners-up: (Chinese Taipei) Chan Hao-ching (Romania) Monica Niculescu
- Score: 6–0, 6–0

Details
- Draw: 64 (4 Q / 3 WC / 3 LL )
- Seeds: 16

Events
Singles	men	women		boys	girls
Doubles	men	women	mixed	boys	girls
WC Singles	men	women	quad
WC Doubles	men	women	quad
Legends	men	women	seniors
← 2016 ·	Wimbledon Championships	· 2018 →

Ekaterina Makarova and Elena Vesnina defeated Chan Hao-ching and Monica Niculescu in the final, 6–0, 6–0 to win the ladies' doubles tennis title at the 2017 Wimbledon Championships. It marked the first time since 1953 where the final scoreline was a double bagel. The win also earned the team their third major title together.

Serena and Venus Williams were the defending champions, but they did not compete due to Serena's pregnancy.

Top seeds Bethanie Mattek-Sands and Lucie Šafářová were attempting to achieve a non-calendar-year Grand Slam, having won the preceding US Open, Australian Open, and French Open titles. However, the pair withdrew prior to their second-round match after Mattek-Sands suffered a knee injury in the second round of the singles competition the previous day.

== Seeds ==
1. (United States) Bethanie Mattek-Sands / (Czech Republic) Lucie Šafářová (second round, withdrew)
2. (Russia) Ekaterina Makarova / (Russia) Elena Vesnina (champions)
3. (Chinese Taipei) Chan Yung-jan / (Switzerland) Martina Hingis (quarterfinals)
4. (Hungary) Tímea Babos / (Czech Republic) Andrea Hlaváčková (third round)
5. (Czech Republic) Lucie Hradecká / (Czech Republic) Kateřina Siniaková (third round)
6. (United States) Abigail Spears / (Slovenia) Katarina Srebotnik (first round)
7. (Germany) Julia Görges / (Czech Republic) Barbora Strýcová (third round)
8. (Australia) Ashleigh Barty / (Australia) Casey Dellacqua (quarterfinals)

9. (Chinese Taipei) Chan Hao-ching / (Romania) Monica Niculescu (final)
10. (Canada) Gabriela Dabrowski / (China) Xu Yifan (first round)
11. (United States) Raquel Atawo / (Latvia) Jeļena Ostapenko (first round)
12. (Germany) Anna-Lena Grönefeld / (Czech Republic) Květa Peschke (semifinals)
13. (Belgium) Kirsten Flipkens / (India) Sania Mirza (third round)
14. (Netherlands) Kiki Bertens / (Sweden) Johanna Larsson (first round)
15. (Slovenia) Andreja Klepač / (Spain) María José Martínez Sánchez (third round)
16. (Japan) Eri Hozumi / (Japan) Miyu Kato (first round)

Click on the seed number of a player to go to their draw section.

== Draw ==
=== Key ===
- Q = Qualifier
- WC = Wild card
- LL = Lucky loser
- Alt = Alternate
- ITF = ITF entry
- PR = Protected ranking
- SR = Special ranking
- SE = Special exempt
- JE = Junior exempt
- JR = Junior Accelerator Programme entrant
- CO = College Accelerator Programme entrant
- NG = Next Gen Accelerator Program entrant
- w/o = Walkover
- r = Retired
- d = Defaulted

=== Finals ===
Quarterfinals
(United States) Catherine Bellis (Czech Republic) Markéta Vondroušová	3	4
9	(Chinese Taipei) Chan Hao-ching (Romania) Monica Niculescu	6	6
(Russia) Svetlana Kuznetsova (France) Kristina Mladenovic	4	4
(Japan) Makoto Ninomiya (Czech Republic) Renata Voráčová	6	6
12	(Germany) Anna-Lena Grönefeld (Czech Republic) Květa Peschke	6	3	6
3	(Chinese Taipei) Chan Yung-jan (Switzerland) Martina Hingis	4	6	4
8	(Australia) Ashleigh Barty (Australia) Casey Dellacqua	4	6	4
2	(Russia) Ekaterina Makarova (Russia) Elena Vesnina	6	4	6

Semifinals
9	(Chinese Taipei) Chan Hao-ching (Romania) Monica Niculescu	7^{7}	4	9
(Japan) Makoto Ninomiya (Czech Republic) Renata Voráčová	6^{4}	6	7
12	(Germany) Anna-Lena Grönefeld (Czech Republic) Květa Peschke	5	2
2	(Russia) Ekaterina Makarova (Russia) Elena Vesnina	7	6

Final
9	(Chinese Taipei) Chan Hao-ching (Romania) Monica Niculescu	0	0
2	(Russia) Ekaterina Makarova (Russia) Elena Vesnina	6	6

=== Top half ===
==== Section 1 ====
First round
1	(United States) B Mattek-Sands (Czech Republic) L Šafářová	7	6
(United States) J Brady (United States) A Riske	5	2
(Ukraine) L Kichenok (Ukraine) L Tsurenko	7	7
(Croatia) D Jurak (China) Q Wang	5	5
(United States) C Bellis (Czech Republic) M Vondroušová	6	6
LL	(Australia) J Moore (Japan) A Omae	2	0
(Ukraine) K Bondarenko (Serbia) A Krunić	6	6
14	(Netherlands) K Bertens (Sweden) J Larsson	1	4
9	(Chinese Taipei) H-c Chan (Romania) M Niculescu	6	3	6
(Paraguay) V Cepede Royg (Romania) R Olaru	4	6	1
Q	(Turkey) İ Soylu (Thailand) V Wongteanchai	6	7^{7}
(Luxembourg) M Minella (Latvia) A Sevastova	1	6^{2}
Q	(Poland) P Kania (Serbia) N Stojanović	3	5
(Spain) L Arruabarrena (Spain) A Parra Santonja	6	7
(Brazil) B Haddad Maia (Croatia) A Konjuh	7^{7}	6^{3}	6
6	(United States) A Spears (Slovenia) K Srebotnik	6^{4}	7^{7}	4

Second round
1	(United States) B Mattek-Sands (Czech Republic) L Šafářová
(Ukraine) L Kichenok (Ukraine) L Tsurenko	w/o
(United States) C Bellis (Czech Republic) M Vondroušová	6	6
(Ukraine) K Bondarenko (Serbia) A Krunić	2	4
9	(Chinese Taipei) H-c Chan (Romania) M Niculescu	6	6
Q	(Turkey) İ Soylu (Thailand) V Wongteanchai	3	3
(Spain) L Arruabarrena (Spain) A Parra Santonja	4	6	0
(Brazil) B Haddad Maia (Croatia) A Konjuh	6	4	6

Third round
(Ukraine) L Kichenok (Ukraine) L Tsurenko	4	2
(United States) C Bellis (Czech Republic) M Vondroušová	6	6
9	(Chinese Taipei) H-c Chan (Romania) M Niculescu	6^{2}	6	6
(Brazil) B Haddad Maia (Croatia) A Konjuh	7^{7}	3	4

Quarterfinals
(United States) C Bellis (Czech Republic) M Vondroušová	3	4
9	(Chinese Taipei) H-c Chan (Romania) M Niculescu	6	6

==== Section 2 ====
First round
4	(Hungary) T Babos (Czech Republic) A Hlaváčková	6	7
WC	(United Kingdom) K Boulter (United Kingdom) K Swan	2	5
PR	(Russia) A Kudryavtseva (Russia) A Panova	2	6	5
LL	(Netherlands) L Kerkhove (Belarus) L Marozava	6	4	7
(Russia) S Kuznetsova (France) K Mladenovic	6	6
(United States) N Melichar (United Kingdom) A Smith	4	3
Q	(Australia) M Adamczak (Australia) S Sanders	6	6
16	(Japan) E Hozumi (Japan) M Kato	1	2
11	(United States) R Atawo (Latvia) J Ostapenko	3	6	3
WC	(United Kingdom) J Rae (United Kingdom) L Robson	6	3	6
(Japan) M Ninomiya (Czech Republic) R Voráčová	6	6
(United States) J Boserup (United States) C McHale	1	2
(Japan) N Hibino (Poland) A Rosolska	2	6	3
(Croatia) M Lučić-Baroni (Germany) A Petkovic	6	3	6
(United States) A Muhammad (United States) T Townsend	4	6^{6}
5	(Czech Republic) L Hradecká (Czech Republic) K Siniaková	6	7^{8}

Second round
4	(Hungary) T Babos (Czech Republic) A Hlaváčková	6	5	6
LL	(Netherlands) L Kerkhove (Belarus) L Marozava	2	7	4
(Russia) S Kuznetsova (France) K Mladenovic	3	7	6
Q	(Australia) M Adamczak (Australia) S Sanders	6	5	2
WC	(United Kingdom) J Rae (United Kingdom) L Robson	4	6^{4}
(Japan) M Ninomiya (Czech Republic) R Voráčová	6	7^{7}
(Croatia) M Lučić-Baroni (Germany) A Petkovic	4	7^{7}	1
5	(Czech Republic) L Hradecká (Czech Republic) K Siniaková	6	6^{4}	6

Third round
4	(Hungary) T Babos (Czech Republic) A Hlaváčková	3	7^{7}	3
(Russia) S Kuznetsova (France) K Mladenovic	6	6^{3}	6
(Japan) M Ninomiya (Czech Republic) R Voráčová	6	6
5	(Czech Republic) L Hradecká (Czech Republic) K Siniaková	4	4

Quarterfinals
(Russia) S Kuznetsova (France) K Mladenovic	4	4
(Japan) M Ninomiya (Czech Republic) R Voráčová	6	6

=== Bottom half ===
==== Section 3 ====
First round
7	(Germany) J Görges (Czech Republic) B Strýcová	6	6^{5}	12
(Chinese Taipei) S-w Hsieh (Czech Republic) B Krejčíková	4	7^{7}	10
(Japan) S Aoyama (China) Z Yang	6	6^{5}	6
(Russia) E Rodina (Russia) N Vikhlyantseva	3	7^{7}	2
PR	(Chinese Taipei) K-c Chang (United States) S Stephens	6	3	6
(China) Y Duan (China) C Liang	3	6	4
(Switzerland) V Golubic (Czech Republic) Kr Plíšková	4	3
12	(Germany) A-L Grönefeld (Czech Republic) K Peschke	6	6
13	(Belgium) K Flipkens (India) S Mirza	6	6
(Japan) N Osaka (China) S Zhang	4	3
WC	(United Kingdom) H Dart (United Kingdom) K Dunne	5	4
(United Kingdom) N Broady (United Kingdom) H Watson	7	6
Q	(Russia) N Dzalamidze (Russia) V Kudermetova	6	4	6
(United States) L Davis (China) X Han	4	6	4
(France) A Cornet (Switzerland) X Knoll	0	2
3	(Chinese Taipei) Y-j Chan (Switzerland) M Hingis	6	6

Second round
7	(Germany) J Görges (Czech Republic) B Strýcová	6	6
(Japan) S Aoyama (China) Z Yang	4	2
PR	(Chinese Taipei) K-c Chang (United States) S Stephens	6^{5}	2
12	(Germany) A-L Grönefeld (Czech Republic) K Peschke	7^{7}	6
13	(Belgium) K Flipkens (India) S Mirza	6	3	6
(United Kingdom) N Broady (United Kingdom) H Watson	3	6	4
Q	(Russia) N Dzalamidze (Russia) V Kudermetova	1	3
3	(Chinese Taipei) Y-j Chan (Switzerland) M Hingis	6	6

Third round
7	(Germany) J Görges (Czech Republic) B Strýcová	3	7^{7}	2
12	(Germany) A-L Grönefeld (Czech Republic) K Peschke	6	6^{5}	6
13	(Belgium) K Flipkens (India) S Mirza	2	4
3	(Chinese Taipei) Y-j Chan (Switzerland) M Hingis	6	6

Quarterfinals
12	(Germany) A-L Grönefeld (Czech Republic) K Peschke	6	3	6
3	(Chinese Taipei) Y-j Chan (Switzerland) M Hingis	4	6	4

==== Section 4 ====
First round
8	(Australia) A Barty (Australia) C Dellacqua	3	6	6
(Serbia) J Janković (United States) C Vandeweghe	6	4	0
(Chinese Taipei) C-j Chuang (Japan) M Doi	6	6
(Georgia (country)) O Kalashnikova (Italy) F Schiavone	4	1
(Ukraine) N Kichenok (Ukraine) O Savchuk	6	6^{8}	6
(Poland) M Linette (United States) M Sanchez	2	7^{10}	4
(Belgium) E Mertens (Netherlands) D Schuurs	6	6
10	(Canada) G Dabrowski (China) Y Xu	2	2
15	(Slovenia) A Klepač (Spain) MJ Martínez Sánchez	6	4	6
(Australia) An Rodionova (Australia) Ar Rodionova	2	6	3
(Germany) M Barthel (Estonia) A Kontaveit	7	6
(United States) S Rogers (Croatia) D Vekić	5	1
(France) O Dodin (Germany) T Maria	6	6
LL	(United States) A Weinhold (United States) C Whoriskey	3	2
(United States) V Lepchenko (Germany) C Witthöft	2	2
2	(Russia) E Makarova (Russia) E Vesnina	6	6

Second round
8	(Australia) A Barty (Australia) C Dellacqua	3	6	10
(Chinese Taipei) C-j Chuang (Japan) M Doi	6	3	8
(Ukraine) N Kichenok (Ukraine) O Savchuk	4	4
(Belgium) E Mertens (Netherlands) D Schuurs	6	6
15	(Slovenia) A Klepač (Spain) MJ Martínez Sánchez	6	3	6
(Germany) M Barthel (Estonia) A Kontaveit	2	6	2
(France) O Dodin (Germany) T Maria	4	3
2	(Russia) E Makarova (Russia) E Vesnina	6	6

Third round
8	(Australia) A Barty (Australia) C Dellacqua	6	7^{8}
(Belgium) E Mertens (Netherlands) D Schuurs	1	6^{6}
15	(Slovenia) A Klepač (Spain) MJ Martínez Sánchez	4	4
2	(Russia) E Makarova (Russia) E Vesnina	6	6

Quarterfinals
8	(Australia) A Barty (Australia) C Dellacqua	4	6	4
2	(Russia) E Makarova (Russia) E Vesnina	6	4	6
