= Andreas Haider-Maurer =

Austrian tennis player

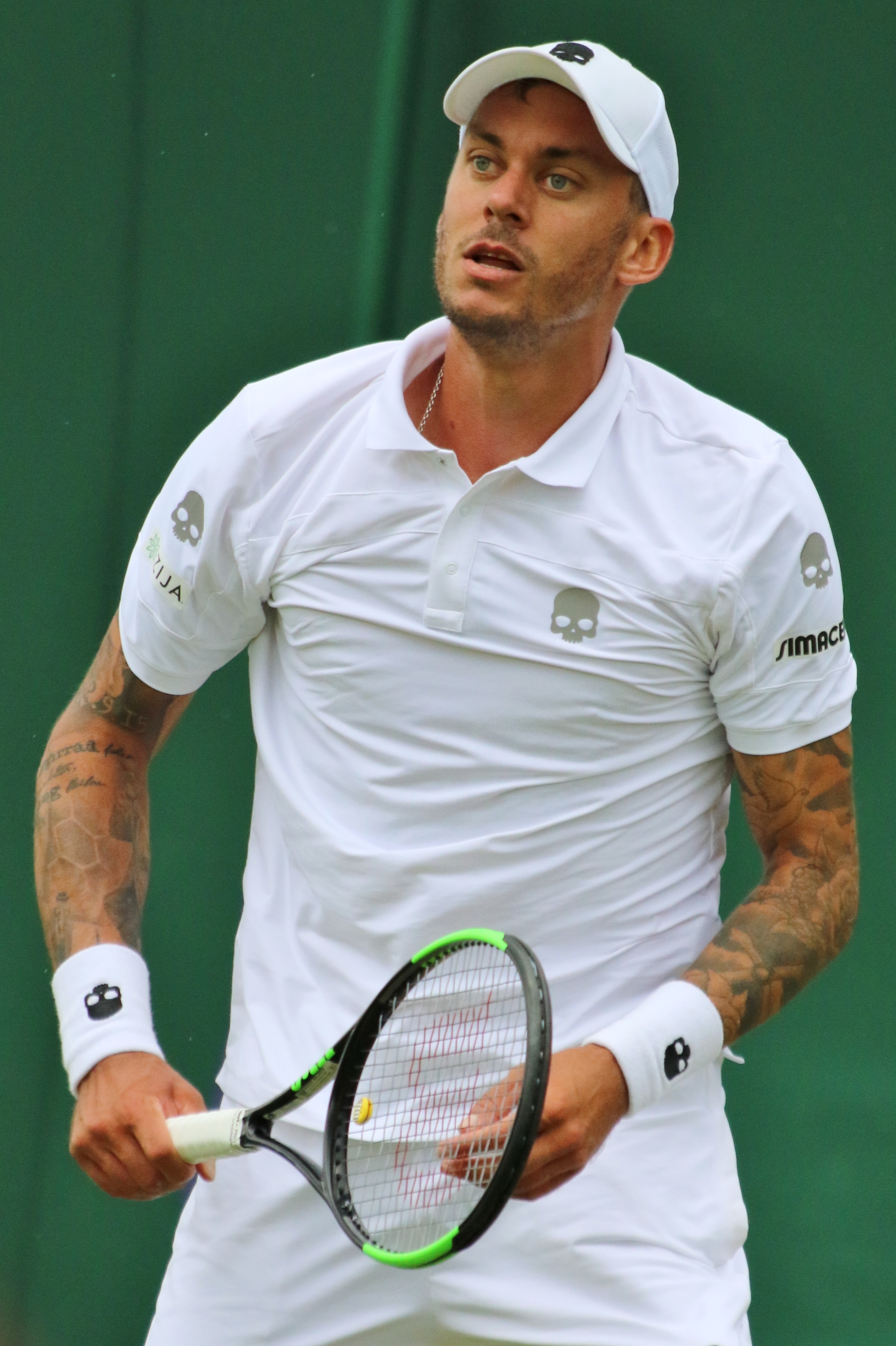
- Haider-Maurer at the 2017 Wimbledon Championships
- Country (sports): Austria
- Born: 22 March 1987 (age 38) Zwettl, Austria
- Height: 1.90 m (6 ft 3 in)
- Turned pro: 2005
- Retired: 2019
- Plays: Right-handed (two-handed backhand)
- Prize money: $1,948,627

Singles
- Career record: 45–79
- Career titles: 0
- Highest ranking: No. 47 (20 April 2015)

Grand Slam singles results
- Australian Open: 2R (2015)
- French Open: 2R (2011, 2014)
- Wimbledon: 2R (2011, 2014)
- US Open: 2R (2013, 2015)

Doubles
- Career record: 4–28
- Career titles: 0
- Highest ranking: No. 290 (3 August 2009)

Grand Slam doubles results
- Australian Open: 1R (2015, 2018)
- French Open: 1R (2015)
- Wimbledon: 1R (2015, 2017)
- US Open: 1R (2011, 2017)

Team competitions
- Davis Cup: QF (2012)

Andreas Haider-Maurer (German pronunciation: [anˈdʁeːas ˈhaɪdɐ ˈmaʊʁɐ]; born 22 March 1987) is a retired professional tennis player from Austria.

In the first round of the 2010 US Open, he forced world No. 5 Robin Söderling to a fifth set before losing the match. That same year, Haider-Maurer reached the final of his home tournament in Vienna. He lost to compatriot, defending champion and top seed Jürgen Melzer.

In late 2015, Haider-Maurer suffered a right heel injury and it eventually turned out that he missed the whole 2016 season. He retired in January 2019 after 3 years of injury problems.

Haider-Maurer won 9 Challenger events and reached a career-high singles ranking of world No. 47 in April 2015.

== ATP career finals ==
=== Singles: 1 (1 runner-up) ===
Legend Grand Slam tournaments (0–0) ATP World Tour Finals (0–0) ATP World Tour Masters 1000 (0–0) ATP World Tour 500 Series (0–0) ATP World Tour 250 Series (0–1)	Finals by surface Hard (0–1) Clay (0–0) Grass (0–0) Carpet (0–0)

Result	W–L	Date	Tournament	Tier	Surface	Opponent	Score
Loss	0–1	Oct 2010	Vienna Open, Austria	250 Series	Hard (i)	(Austria) Jürgen Melzer	7–6^{(12–10)}, 6–7^{(4–7)}, 4–6

== Singles performance timeline ==
Key
W	F	SF	QF	#R	RR	Q#	P#	DNQ	A	Z#	PO	G	S	B	NMS	NTI	P	NH

(W) winner; (F) finalist; (SF) semifinalist; (QF) quarterfinalist; (#R) rounds 4, 3, 2, 1; (RR) round-robin stage; (Q#) qualification round; (P#) preliminary round; (DNQ) did not qualify; (A) absent; (Z#) Davis/Fed Cup Zonal Group (with number indication) or (PO) play-off; (G) gold, (S) silver or (B) bronze Olympic/Paralympic medal; (NMS) not a Masters tournament; (NTI) not a Tier I tournament; (P) postponed; (NH) not held; (SR) strike rate (events won / competed); (W–L) win–loss record.

Current through the 2018 French Open.

Tournament	2005	2006	2007	2008	2009	2010	2011	2012	2013	2014	2015	2016	2017	2018	SR	W–L
Grand Slam tournaments
Australian Open	A	A	A	A	A	Q1	Q2	A	Q2	A	2R	A	A	1R	0 / 2	1–2
French Open	A	A	A	Q1	A	Q1	1R	1R	1R	2R	1R	A	A	1R	0 / 6	2–6
Wimbledon	A	A	A	A	Q2	Q2	2R	Q2	1R	2R	1R	A	1R	A	0 / 5	2–5
US Open	A	A	A	A	A	1R	1R	Q1	2R	1R	2R	A	1R	A	0 / 6	2–6
Win–loss	0–0	0–0	0–0	0–0	0–0	0–1	2–3	0–1	1–3	2–3	2–4	0–0	0–2	0–2	0 / 19	7–19
National representation
Davis Cup	A	A	A	A	A	PO	PO	QF	1R	Z1	Z1	A	A	A	0 / 2	6–5
Career statistics
Titles / Finals	0 / 0	0 / 0	0 / 0	0 / 0	0 / 0	0 / 1	0 / 0	0 / 0	0 / 0	0 / 0	0 / 0	0 / 0	0 / 0	0 / 0	0 / 1	
Overall win–loss	0–0	1–1	0–1	0–0	0–1	5–4	8–14	1–5	3–7	5–8	22–26	0–0	0–3	0–9	45–79	
Year-end ranking	934	447	247	290	196	119	128	112	112	82	63	–	452	391	36%	
