= 2017 Wimbledon Championships =

- Date: 3–16 July
- Edition: 131st
- Category: Grand Slam (ITF)
- Draw: 128S / 64D / 48XD
- Prize money: £31,600,000
- Surface: Grass
- Location: Church Road; SW19, Wimbledon, London, United Kingdom
- Venue: All England Lawn Tennis and Croquet Club

Champions

Men's singles
- (Switzerland) Roger Federer

Women's singles
- (Spain) Garbiñe Muguruza

Men's doubles
- (Poland) Łukasz Kubot / (Brazil) Marcelo Melo

Women's doubles
- (Russia) Ekaterina Makarova / (Russia) Elena Vesnina

Mixed doubles
- (United Kingdom) Jamie Murray / (Switzerland) Martina Hingis

Wheelchair men's singles
- (Sweden) Stefan Olsson

Wheelchair women's singles
- (Netherlands) Diede de Groot

Wheelchair men's doubles
- (United Kingdom) Alfie Hewett / (United Kingdom) Gordon Reid

Wheelchair women's doubles
- (Japan) Yui Kamiji / (United Kingdom) Jordanne Whiley

Boys' singles
- (Spain) Alejandro Davidovich Fokina

Girls' singles
- (United States) Claire Liu

Boys' doubles
- (Argentina) Axel Geller / (Chinese Taipei) Hsu Yu-hsiou

Girls' doubles
- (Serbia) Olga Danilović / (Slovenia) Kaja Juvan

Gentlemen's invitation doubles
- (Australia) Lleyton Hewitt / (Australia) Mark Philippoussis

Ladies' invitation doubles
- (Zimbabwe) Cara Black / (United States) Martina Navratilova

Senior gentlemen's invitation doubles
- (Netherlands) Jacco Eltingh / (Netherlands) Paul Haarhuis
- Wimbledon Championships

The 2017 Wimbledon Championships was a Grand Slam tennis tournament that took place at the All England Lawn Tennis and Croquet Club in Wimbledon, London, United Kingdom. The main draw matches commenced on 3 July 2017 and concluded on 16 July 2017. Roger Federer won the gentlemen's singles title for a record eighth time, surpassing Pete Sampras and William Renshaw, who both won the gentlemen's singles title seven times. Federer did not drop a set throughout the tournament, the second time in the Open Era and the first since Björn Borg in 1976. Garbiñe Muguruza won the ladies' singles title.

The 2017 tournament was the 131st edition of the championships, the 50th in the Open Era and the third Grand Slam tournament of the year. It is played on grass courts, organised by the All England Lawn Tennis Club and the International Tennis Federation and is part of the ATP World Tour, the WTA Tour, the ITF Junior tour and the NEC Tour.

Andy Murray was the defending champion in the Gentlemen's singles but lost to Sam Querrey in the quarterfinals. Two-time defending Ladies' singles champion Serena Williams did not defend her title, as she ended her season in April due to pregnancy.

== Tournament ==
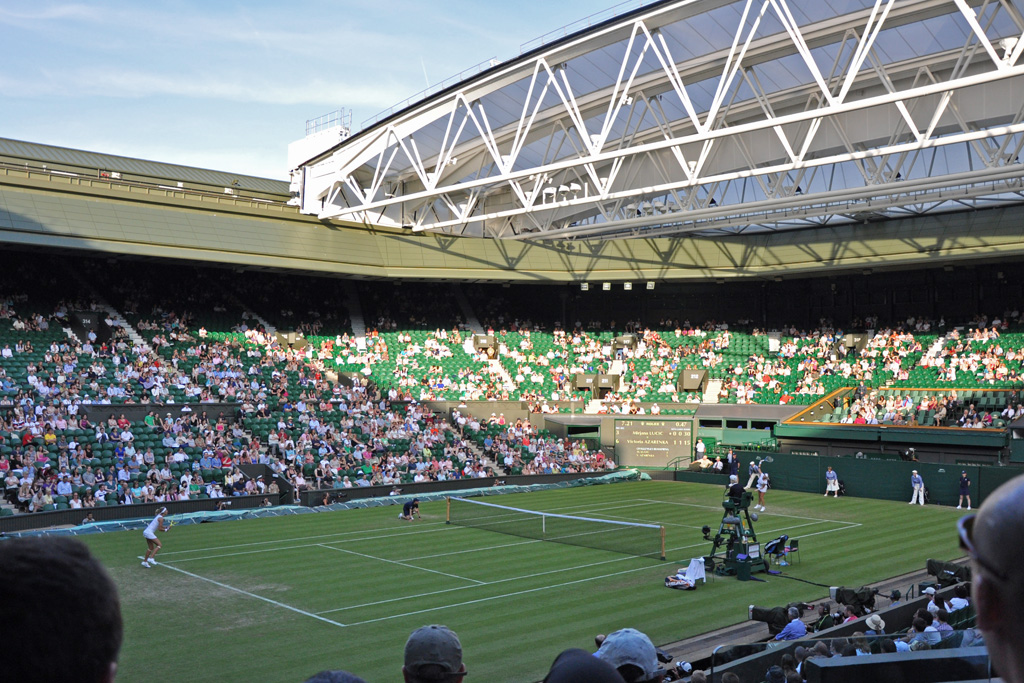
Centre Court where the Finals of Wimbledon take place

The 2017 Wimbledon Championships was the 131st edition of the tournament and was held at the All England Lawn Tennis and Croquet Club in London.

The tournament was run by the International Tennis Federation (ITF) and was included in the 2017 ATP World Tour and the 2017 WTA Tour calendars under the Grand Slam category. The tournament consisted of men's (singles and doubles), women's (singles and doubles), mixed doubles, boys (under 18 – singles and doubles) and girls (under 18 – singles and doubles), which is also a part of the Grade A category of tournaments for under 18, and singles and doubles events for men's and women's wheelchair tennis players as part of the UNIQLO Tour under the Grand Slam category. The tournament was played only on grass courts; main draw matches were played at the All England Lawn Tennis and Croquet Club, Wimbledon; qualifying matches were played at the Bank of England Sports Ground, in Roehampton.

== Point and prize money distribution ==
=== Point distribution ===
Below are the tables with the point distribution for each discipline of the tournament.

==== Senior points ====
Event	W	F	SF	QF	Round of 16	Round of 32	Round of 64	Round of 128	Q	Q3	Q2	Q1
Men's singles	2000	1200	720	360	180	90	45	10	25	16	8	0
Men's doubles	2000	1200	720	360	180	90		0	25		0	0
Women's singles	2000	1300	780	430	240	130	70	10	40	30	20	2
Women's doubles	2000	1300	780	430	240	130	10	—	40	—	—	—

==== Wheelchair points ====
Event	W	F	3rd	4th
Singles	800	500	375	100
Doubles	800	500	100	—

==== Junior points ====
Event	W	F	SF	QF	Round of 16	Round of 32	Q	Q2	Q1
Boys' singles	375	270	180	120	75	30	25	20	0
Girls' singles	375	270	180	120	75	30	25	20	0
Boys' doubles	270	180	120	75	45	—	—	—	—
Girls' doubles	270	180	120	75	45	—	—	—	—

=== Prize money ===
The Wimbledon total prize money for 2017 was increased to £31.6m. The winners of the men's and women's singles titles would earn £2.2m. Prize money for the men's and women's doubles and wheelchair players was also increased for the 2017 competition.

Event	W	F	SF	QF	Round of 16	Round of 32	Round of 64	Round of 128	Q3	Q2	Q1
Singles	£2,200,000	£1,100,000	£550,000	£275,000	£147,000	£90,000	£57,000	£35,000	£17,500	£8,750	£4,375
Doubles*	£400,000	£200,000	£100,000	£50,000	£26,500	£16,500	£10,750	—	—	—	—
Mixed doubles*	£100,000	£50,000	£25,000	£12,000	£6,000	£3,000	£1,500	—	—	—	—
Wheelchair singles	£32,000	£16,000	£11,000	£7,500	—	—	—	—	—	—	—
Wheelchair doubles*	£12,000	£6,000	£3,500	—	—	—	—	—	—	—	—
Invitation doubles	£23,000	£20,000	£17,000	£17,000	£17,000	—	—	—	—	—	—

_{* per team}

== Singles players ==
Men's singles

Champion		Runner-up	
(Switzerland) Roger Federer [3]		(Croatia) Marin Čilić [7]	
Semifinals out
(United States) Sam Querrey [24]		(Czech Republic) Tomáš Berdych [11]	
Quarterfinals out
(United Kingdom) Andy Murray [1]	(Luxembourg) Gilles Müller [16]	(Canada) Milos Raonic [6]	(Serbia) Novak Djokovic [2]
4th round out
(France) Benoît Paire	(South Africa) Kevin Anderson	(Spain) Rafael Nadal [4]	(Spain) Roberto Bautista Agut [18]
(Germany) Alexander Zverev [10]	(Bulgaria) Grigor Dimitrov [13]	(Austria) Dominic Thiem [8]	(France) Adrian Mannarino
3rd round out
(Italy) Fabio Fognini [28]	(Poland) Jerzy Janowicz (PR)	(France) Jo-Wilfried Tsonga [12]	(Belgium) Ruben Bemelmans (Q)
(Russia) Karen Khachanov [30]	(United Kingdom) Aljaž Bedene	(Japan) Kei Nishikori [9]	(United States) Steve Johnson [26]
(Spain) Albert Ramos Viñolas [25]	(Austria) Sebastian Ofner (Q)	(Israel) Dudi Sela	(Germany) Mischa Zverev [27]
(United States) Jared Donaldson	(Spain) David Ferrer	(France) Gaël Monfils [15]	(Latvia) Ernests Gulbis (PR)
2nd round out
(Germany) Dustin Brown	(Czech Republic) Jiří Veselý	(France) Pierre-Hugues Herbert	(France) Lucas Pouille [14]
(Italy) Simone Bolelli (Q)	(Georgia (country)) Nikoloz Basilashvili	(Italy) Andreas Seppi	(Russia) Daniil Medvedev
(United States) Donald Young	(Brazil) Thiago Monteiro	(Bosnia and Herzegovina) Damir Džumhur	(Czech Republic) Lukáš Rosol (Q)
(Ukraine) Sergiy Stakhovsky (Q)	(Germany) Peter Gojowczyk (Q)	(Moldova) Radu Albot	(Germany) Florian Mayer
(Russia) Mikhail Youzhny	(Russia) Andrey Rublev (Q)	(United States) Jack Sock [17]	(United States) Frances Tiafoe
(Cyprus) Marcos Baghdatis	(United States) John Isner [23]	(Kazakhstan) Mikhail Kukushkin	(Serbia) Dušan Lajović
(France) Gilles Simon	(Italy) Paolo Lorenzi [32]	(Belgium) Steve Darcis	(United States) Ryan Harrison
(United Kingdom) Kyle Edmund	(Japan) Yūichi Sugita	(Argentina) Juan Martín del Potro [29]	(Czech Republic) Adam Pavlásek
1st round out
(Kazakhstan) Alexander Bublik (LL)	(Portugal) João Sousa	(Ukraine) Illya Marchenko (Q)	(Russia) Dmitry Tursunov (PR)
(Australia) Nick Kyrgios [20]	(Brazil) Rogério Dutra Silva	(Canada) Denis Shapovalov (WC)	(Tunisia) Malek Jaziri
(United Kingdom) Cameron Norrie (WC)	(Chinese Taipei) Lu Yen-hsun	(Argentina) Carlos Berlocq	(Italy) Thomas Fabbiano
(Spain) Fernando Verdasco [31]	(Slovakia) Norbert Gombos	(Germany) Tommy Haas (WC)	(Switzerland) Stan Wawrinka [5]
(Australia) John Millman (PR)	(Uzbekistan) Denis Istomin	(Australia) Andrew Whittington (Q)	(Russia) Andrey Kuznetsov
(Croatia) Ivo Karlović [21]	(Argentina) Renzo Olivo	(Switzerland) Henri Laaksonen	(Hungary) Márton Fucsovics (WC)
(Italy) Marco Cecchinato	(France) Julien Benneteau	(Romania) Marius Copil	(Austria) Andreas Haider-Maurer (PR)
(Argentina) Nicolás Kicker	(Argentina) Facundo Bagnis	(Serbia) Viktor Troicki	(Germany) Philipp Kohlschreiber
(Germany) Jan-Lennard Struff	(France) Nicolas Mahut	(Italy) Stefano Travaglia (Q)	(Australia) Jordan Thompson
(Chile) Cristian Garín (Q)	(Brazil) Thomaz Bellucci	(Netherlands) Robin Haase	(Russia) Evgeny Donskoy
(Argentina) Diego Schwartzman	(United Kingdom) James Ward (WC)	(Spain) Marcel Granollers	(United States) Taylor Fritz (Q)
(Australia) Bernard Tomic	(Japan) Taro Daniel	(Greece) Stefanos Tsitsipas (Q)	(Ukraine) Alexandr Dolgopolov
(Canada) Vasek Pospisil	(Chile) Nicolás Jarry (Q)	(Serbia) Janko Tipsarević	(Argentina) Horacio Zeballos
(France) Richard Gasquet [22]	(Lithuania) Ričardas Berankis	(Croatia) Borna Ćorić	(France) Jérémy Chardy
(Germany) Daniel Brands (Q)	(United Kingdom) Alexander Ward (Q)	(United Kingdom) Brydan Klein (WC)	(Spain) Feliciano López [19]
(Australia) Thanasi Kokkinakis (PR)	(Dominican Republic) Víctor Estrella Burgos	(United States) Ernesto Escobedo	(Slovakia) Martin Kližan

Women's singles

Champion		Runner-up	
(Spain) Garbiñe Muguruza [14]		(United States) Venus Williams [10]	
Semifinals out
(Slovakia) Magdaléna Rybáriková (PR)		(United Kingdom) Johanna Konta [6]	
Quarterfinals out
(Russia) Svetlana Kuznetsova [7]	(United States) CoCo Vandeweghe [24]	(Latvia) Jeļena Ostapenko [13]	(Romania) Simona Halep [2]
4th round out
(Germany) Angelique Kerber [1]	(Poland) Agnieszka Radwańska [9]	(Croatia) Petra Martić (Q)	(Denmark) Caroline Wozniacki [5]
(Croatia) Ana Konjuh [27]	(Ukraine) Elina Svitolina [4]	(France) Caroline Garcia [21]	(Belarus) Victoria Azarenka (PR)
3rd round out
(United States) Shelby Rogers	(Romania) Sorana Cîrstea	(Switzerland) Timea Bacsinszky [19]	(Slovenia) Polona Hercog (Q)
(Ukraine) Lesia Tsurenko	(Kazakhstan) Zarina Diyas	(United States) Alison Riske	(Estonia) Anett Kontaveit
(Slovakia) Dominika Cibulková [8]	(Japan) Naomi Osaka	(Italy) Camila Giorgi	(Germany) Carina Witthöft
(Greece) Maria Sakkari	(United States) Madison Brengle	(United Kingdom) Heather Watson (WC)	(China) Peng Shuai
2nd round out
(Belgium) Kirsten Flipkens	(Czech Republic) Lucie Šafářová [32]	(United States) Bethanie Mattek-Sands (WC)	(Belgium) Yanina Wickmayer
(United States) Christina McHale	(Slovakia) Kristína Kučová	(United States) Varvara Lepchenko	(Russia) Ekaterina Makarova
(Czech Republic) Karolína Plíšková [3]	(Switzerland) Viktorija Golubic	(Czech Republic) Denisa Allertová	(Australia) Arina Rodionova (Q)
(France) Kristina Mladenovic [12]	(Germany) Tatjana Maria	(Russia) Daria Kasatkina [29]	(Bulgaria) Tsvetana Pironkova
(United States) Jennifer Brady	(Romania) Irina-Camelia Begu	(Czech Republic) Barbora Strýcová [22]	(China) Wang Qiang
(Canada) Françoise Abanda (Q)	(United States) Madison Keys [17]	(Belarus) Aryna Sabalenka (Q)	(Italy) Francesca Schiavone
(Croatia) Donna Vekić	(Czech Republic) Kristýna Plíšková	(Romania) Ana Bogdan	(Czech Republic) Petra Kvitová [11]
(Russia) Elena Vesnina [15]	(Latvia) Anastasija Sevastova [18]	(Spain) Carla Suárez Navarro [25]	(Brazil) Beatriz Haddad Maia
1st round out
(United States) Irina Falconi (Q)	(Japan) Misaki Doi	(United States) Julia Boserup	(France) Océane Dodin
(Netherlands) Kiki Bertens [23]	(Poland) Magda Linette	(Ukraine) Kateryna Bondarenko	(Russia) Ekaterina Alexandrova
(Serbia) Jelena Janković	(United Kingdom) Katie Boulter (WC)	(Canada) Bianca Andreescu (Q)	(Puerto Rico) Monica Puig
(United States) Lauren Davis [28]	(Germany) Annika Beck	(Belgium) Alison Van Uytvanck (Q)	(Tunisia) Ons Jabeur (Q)
(Russia) Evgeniya Rodina	(Romania) Monica Niculescu	(Germany) Julia Görges	(China) Zhang Shuai [30]
(Australia) Daria Gavrilova [20]	(Japan) Risa Ozaki	(China) Han Xinyun	(Russia) Anastasia Pavlyuchenkova [18]
(France) Pauline Parmentier	(United States) Sloane Stephens (PR)	(Russia) Anastasia Potapova (Q)	(Germany) Mona Barthel
(China) Zheng Saisai	(Spain) Lara Arruabarrena	(Italy) Sara Errani	(Hungary) Tímea Babos
(Germany) Andrea Petkovic	(Montenegro) Danka Kovinić	(United Kingdom) Naomi Broady (WC)	(Germany) Sabine Lisicki (PR)
(Paraguay) Verónica Cepede Royg	(Spain) Sara Sorribes Tormo	(Chinese Taipei) Chang Kai-chen	(Belgium) Elise Mertens
(Belarus) Aliaksandra Sasnovich	(Japan) Kurumi Nara	(France) Alizé Cornet	(Japan) Nao Hibino
(Croatia) Mirjana Lučić-Baroni [26]	(Russia) Irina Khromacheva	(Luxembourg) Mandy Minella	(Australia) Ashleigh Barty
(Chinese Taipei) Hsieh Su-wei	(Russia) Natalia Vikhlyantseva	(Czech Republic) Kateřina Siniaková	(Italy) Roberta Vinci [31]
(Slovakia) Jana Čepelová	(China) Duan Yingying	(Netherlands) Richèl Hogenkamp	(Sweden) Johanna Larsson
(Russia) Anna Blinkova (Q)	(United States) Catherine Bellis	(Belgium) Maryna Zanevska	(Kazakhstan) Yulia Putintseva
(Canada) Eugenie Bouchard	(Czech Republic) Markéta Vondroušová	(United Kingdom) Laura Robson (WC)	(New Zealand) Marina Erakovic (Q)

== Day-by-day summaries ==
=== Gentlemen's doubles ===
Team		Rank^{1}	Seed
(Finland) Henri Kontinen	(Australia) John Peers	3	1
(France) Pierre-Hugues Herbert	(France) Nicolas Mahut	11	2
(United Kingdom) Jamie Murray	(Brazil) Bruno Soares	11	3
(Poland) Łukasz Kubot	(Brazil) Marcelo Melo	11	4
(United States) Bob Bryan	(United States) Mike Bryan	18	5
(Croatia) Ivan Dodig	(Spain) Marcel Granollers	25	6
(South Africa) Raven Klaasen	(United States) Rajeev Ram	25	7
(India) Rohan Bopanna	(France) Édouard Roger-Vasselin	37	8
(Netherlands) Jean-Julien Rojer	(Romania) Horia Tecău	42	9
(United States) Ryan Harrison	(New Zealand) Michael Venus	45	10
(Spain) Feliciano López	(Spain) Marc López	48	11
(Colombia) Juan Sebastián Cabal	(Colombia) Robert Farah	48	12
(France) Fabrice Martin	(Canada) Daniel Nestor	60	13
(Romania) Florin Mergea	(Pakistan) Aisam-ul-Haq Qureshi	65	14
(Chile) Julio Peralta	(Argentina) Horacio Zeballos	68	15
(Austria) Oliver Marach	(Croatia) Mate Pavić	72	16

- ^{1} Rankings were as of 26 June 2017.

=== Ladies' doubles ===
Team		Rank^{1}	Seed
(United States) Bethanie Mattek-Sands	(Czech Republic) Lucie Šafářová	3	1
(Russia) Ekaterina Makarova	(Russia) Elena Vesnina	8	2
(Chinese Taipei) Chan Yung-jan	(Switzerland) Martina Hingis	9	3
(Hungary) Tímea Babos	(Czech Republic) Andrea Hlaváčková	19	4
(Czech Republic) Lucie Hradecká	(Czech Republic) Kateřina Siniaková	31	5
(United States) Abigail Spears	(Slovenia) Katarina Srebotnik	40	6
(Germany) Julia Görges	(Czech Republic) Barbora Strýcová	41	7
(Australia) Ashleigh Barty	(Australia) Casey Dellacqua	41	8
(Chinese Taipei) Chan Hao-ching	(Romania) Monica Niculescu	44	9
(Canada) Gabriela Dabrowski	(China) Xu Yifan	47	10
(United States) Raquel Atawo	(Latvia) Jeļena Ostapenko	49	11
(Germany) Anna-Lena Grönefeld	(Czech Republic) Květa Peschke	56	12
(Belgium) Kirsten Flipkens	(India) Sania Mirza	57	13
(Netherlands) Kiki Bertens	(Sweden) Johanna Larsson	61	14
(Slovenia) Andreja Klepač	(Spain) María José Martínez Sánchez	63	15
(Japan) Eri Hozumi	(Japan) Miyu Kato	77	16

- ^{1} Rankings were as of 26 June 2017.

=== Mixed doubles ===
Team		Rank^{1}	Seed
(United Kingdom) Jamie Murray	(Switzerland) Martina Hingis	8	1
(Brazil) Bruno Soares	(Russia) Elena Vesnina	10	2
~~(Poland) Łukasz Kubot~~	~~(Chinese Taipei) Chan Yung-jan~~	~~14~~	~~3~~
(Croatia) Ivan Dodig	(India) Sania Mirza	18	4
(France) Édouard Roger-Vasselin	(Czech Republic) Andrea Hlaváčková	24	5
(United States) Rajeev Ram	(Australia) Casey Dellacqua	32	6
(South Africa) Raven Klaasen	(Slovenia) Katarina Srebotnik	34	7
(Netherlands) Jean-Julien Rojer	(Chinese Taipei) Chan Hao-ching	43	8
(Colombia) Juan Sebastián Cabal	(United States) Abigail Spears	43	9
(India) Rohan Bopanna	(Canada) Gabriela Dabrowski	44	10
(Canada) Daniel Nestor	(Slovenia) Andreja Klepač	46	11
(Belarus) Max Mirnyi	(Russia) Ekaterina Makarova	50	12
(Pakistan) Aisam-ul-Haq Qureshi	(Germany) Anna-Lena Grönefeld	52	13
(Poland) Marcin Matkowski	(Czech Republic) Květa Peschke	68	14
(New Zealand) Michael Venus	(Czech Republic) Barbora Krejčiková	71	15
(Czech Republic) Roman Jebavý	(Czech Republic) Lucie Hradecká	79	16

- ^{1} Rankings were as of 3 July 2017.

== Champions ==
=== Seniors ===
==== Gentlemen's singles ====
- (Switzerland) Roger Federer def. (Croatia) Marin Čilić, 6–3, 6–1, 6–4

==== Ladies' singles ====
- (Spain) Garbiñe Muguruza def. (United States) Venus Williams, 7–5, 6–0

==== Gentlemen's doubles ====
- (Poland) Łukasz Kubot / (Brazil) Marcelo Melo def. (Austria) Oliver Marach / (Croatia) Mate Pavić, 5–7, 7–5, 7–6^{(7–2)}, 3–6, 13–11

==== Ladies' doubles ====
- (Russia) Ekaterina Makarova / (Russia) Elena Vesnina def. (Chinese Taipei) Chan Hao-ching / (Romania) Monica Niculescu, 6–0, 6–0

==== Mixed doubles ====
- (United Kingdom) Jamie Murray / (Switzerland) Martina Hingis def. (Finland) Henri Kontinen / (United Kingdom) Heather Watson, 6–4, 6–4

=== Juniors ===
==== Boys' singles ====
- (Spain) Alejandro Davidovich Fokina def. (Argentina) Axel Geller, 7–6^{(7–2)}, 6–3

==== Girls' singles ====
- (United States) Claire Liu def. (United States) Ann Li, 6–2, 5–7, 6–2

==== Boys' doubles ====
- (Argentina) Axel Geller / (Chinese Taipei) Hsu Yu-hsiou def. (Austria) Jurij Rodionov / (Czech Republic) Michael Vrbenský, 6–4, 6–4

==== Girls' doubles ====
- (Serbia) Olga Danilović / (Slovenia) Kaja Juvan def. (United States) Caty McNally / (United States) Whitney Osuigwe, 6–4, 6–3

=== Invitation ===
==== Gentlemen's invitation doubles ====
- (Australia) Lleyton Hewitt / (Australia) Mark Philippoussis def. (United States) Justin Gimelstob / (United Kingdom) Ross Hutchins, 6–3, 6–3

==== Ladies' invitation doubles ====
- (Zimbabwe) Cara Black / (United States) Martina Navratilova def. (Spain) Arantxa Sánchez Vicario / (Tunisia) Selima Sfar, 6–2, 4–6, [10–4]

==== Senior gentlemen's invitation doubles ====
- (Netherlands) Jacco Eltingh / (Netherlands) Paul Haarhuis def. (Netherlands) Richard Krajicek / (United Kingdom) Mark Petchey, 4−6, 6−3, [10−6]

=== Wheelchair events ===
==== Wheelchair gentlemen's singles ====
- (Sweden) Stefan Olsson def. (Argentina) Gustavo Fernández, 7−5, 3−6, 7−5

==== Wheelchair ladies' singles ====
- (Netherlands) Diede de Groot def. (Germany) Sabine Ellerbrock, 6–0, 6–4

==== Wheelchair gentlemen's doubles ====
- (United Kingdom) Alfie Hewett / (United Kingdom) Gordon Reid def. (France) Stéphane Houdet / (France) Nicolas Peifer, 6–7^{(5–7)}, 7–5, 7–6^{(7–3)}

==== Wheelchair ladies' doubles ====
- (Japan) Yui Kamiji / (United Kingdom) Jordanne Whiley def. (Netherlands) Marjolein Buis / (Netherlands) Diede de Groot, 2–6, 6–3, 6–0

== Main draw wild card entries ==
The following players received wild cards into the main draw senior events.

=== Gentlemen's doubles ===
- (United Kingdom) Jay Clarke / (United Kingdom) Marcus Willis
- (United Kingdom) Scott Clayton / (United Kingdom) Jonny O'Mara
- (United Kingdom) Brydan Klein / (United Kingdom) Joe Salisbury
- (Australia) Thanasi Kokkinakis / (Australia) Jordan Thompson
- (United Kingdom) Ken Skupski / (United Kingdom) Neal Skupski

=== Ladies' doubles ===
- (United Kingdom) Katie Boulter / (United Kingdom) Katie Swan
- (United Kingdom) Harriet Dart / (United Kingdom) Katy Dunne
- (United Kingdom) Jocelyn Rae / (United Kingdom) Laura Robson

=== Mixed doubles ===
- (United Kingdom) Liam Broady / (United Kingdom) Naomi Broady
- (United Kingdom) Dominic Inglot / (United Kingdom) Laura Robson
- (United Kingdom) Joe Salisbury / (United Kingdom) Katy Dunne
- (United Kingdom) Ken Skupski / (United Kingdom) Jocelyn Rae
- (United Kingdom) Neal Skupski / (United Kingdom) Anna Smith

== Main draw qualifier entries ==
The qualifying competitions take place in Bank of England Sports Centre, Roehampton started from 26 June 2017 and to be scheduled to end on 29 June 2017. However, due to heavy rain on the second day, it has now extended to 30 June 2017.

=== Gentlemen's doubles ===
Gentlemen's doubles qualifiers

1. (Sweden) Johan Brunström / (Sweden) Andreas Siljeström
2. (Germany) Kevin Krawietz / (Slovakia) Igor Zelenay
3. (France) Hugo Nys / (Croatia) Antonio Šančić
4. (Chinese Taipei) Hsieh Cheng-peng / (United States) Max Schnur

Lucky losers

1. (Netherlands) Sander Arends / (Chinese Taipei) Peng Hsien-yin
2. (Uruguay) Ariel Behar / (Belarus) Aliaksandr Bury
3. (Croatia) Dino Marcan / (Austria) Tristan-Samuel Weissborn
4. (Serbia) Ilija Bozoljac / (Italy) Flavio Cipolla

=== Ladies' doubles ===
Ladies' doubles qualifiers

1. (Russia) Natela Dzalamidze / (Russia) Veronika Kudermetova
2. (Poland) Paula Kania / (Serbia) Nina Stojanović
3. (Australia) Monique Adamczak / (Australia) Storm Sanders
4. (Turkey) İpek Soylu / (Thailand) Varatchaya Wongteanchai

Lucky losers

1. (Netherlands) Lesley Kerkhove / (Belarus) Lidziya Marozava
2. (Australia) Jessica Moore / (Japan) Akiko Omae
3. (United States) Ashley Weinhold / (United States) Caitlin Whoriskey

Preceded by 2017 French Open	Grand Slam Tournaments	Succeeded by 2017 US Open
Preceded by 2016 Wimbledon Championships	The Championships, Wimbledon	Succeeded by 2018 Wimbledon Championships
