= 2019 Murray Trophy – Glasgow =

- Date: 16–22 September
- Edition: 2nd
- Draw: 48S / 16D
- Surface: Hard (indoor)
- Location: Glasgow, United Kingdom
- Venue: Scotstoun Leisure Centre

Champions

Singles
- (Finland) Emil Ruusuvuori

Doubles
- (Belgium) Ruben Bemelmans / (Germany) Daniel Masur
← 2018 ·	Murray Trophy – Glasgow	· 2020 →

The 2019 Murray Trophy – Glasgow was a professional tennis tournament played on indoor hard courts. It was the second edition of the tournament which was part of the 2019 ATP Challenger Tour. It took place in Glasgow, United Kingdom, between 16 and 22 September 2019.

== Singles main-draw entrants ==
=== Seeds ===
Country	Player	Rank^{1}	Seed
TUN	Malek Jaziri	111	1
~~AUT~~	~~Dennis Novak~~	~~122~~	~~2~~
FRA	Quentin Halys	160	3
FIN	Emil Ruusuvuori	163	4
IND	Ramkumar Ramanathan	176	5
ITA	Roberto Marcora	180	6
ESP	Nicola Kuhn	191	7
BEL	Ruben Bemelmans	212	8
GER	Tobias Kamke	213	9
BIH	Mirza Bašić	220	10
ESP	Roberto Ortega Olmedo	243	11
AUS	John-Patrick Smith	247	12
FRA	Mathias Bourgue	251	13
GER	Daniel Masur	253	14
TUR	Cem İlkel	260	15
FRA	Alexandre Müller	275	16
AUT	Jurij Rodionov	295	17

^{1} Rankings are as of 9 September 2019.

=== Other entrants ===
The following players received wildcards into the singles main draw:

- (United Kingdom) Felix Gill
- (United Kingdom) Luke Johnson
- (United Kingdom) Aidan McHugh
- (United Kingdom) Harry Wendelken
- (United Kingdom) Mark Whitehouse

The following player received entry into the singles main draw using a protected ranking:

- (Austria) Maximilian Neuchrist

The following players received entry into the singles main draw as alternates:

- (Finland) Harri Heliövaara
- (Netherlands) Sem Verbeek

The following players received entry from the qualifying draw:

- (United Kingdom) Scott Duncan
- (Sweden) Jonathan Mridha

The following player received entry as a lucky loser:

- (Poland) Karol Drzewiecki

== Champions ==
=== Singles ===
- (Finland) Emil Ruusuvuori def. (France) Alexandre Müller 6–3, 6–1.

=== Doubles ===
- (Belgium) Ruben Bemelmans / (Germany) Daniel Masur def. (United Kingdom) Jamie Murray / (Australia) John-Patrick Smith 4–6, 6–3, [10–8].
