= 2021 Challenger Eckental – Singles =

Singles
- 2021 Challenger Eckental

Final
- Champion: (Germany) Daniel Masur
- Runner-up: (United States) Maxime Cressy
- Score: 6–4, 6–4

Events
Singles	Doubles
- Challenger Eckental

Sebastian Korda was the defending champion but chose not to defend his title.

Daniel Masur won the title after defeating Maxime Cressy 6–4, 6–4 in the final.

== Seeds ==
1. (Australia) Jordan Thompson (quarterfinals)
2. (Czech Republic) Jiří Veselý (quarterfinals)
3. (Austria) Jurij Rodionov (first round)
4. (Germany) Oscar Otte (first round)
5. (Czech Republic) Tomáš Macháč (semifinals)
6. (United States) Maxime Cressy (final)
7. (Germany) Mats Moraing (withdrew)
8. (Poland) Kacper Żuk (first round)

== Draw ==
Key

- Q = Qualifier
- WC = Wild card
- LL = Lucky loser
- Alt = Alternate
- ITF = ITF entry
- PR = Protected ranking
- SR = Special ranking
- SE = Special exempt
- JE = Junior exempt
- JR = Junior Accelerator Programme entrant
- CO = College Accelerator Programme entrant
- NG = Next Gen Accelerator Program entrant
- w/o = Walkover
- r = Retired
- d = Defaulted

=== Finals ===
Semifinals
(Switzerland) Marc-Andrea Hüsler	2	3
(Germany) Daniel Masur	6	6
5	(Czech Republic) Tomáš Macháč	3	6	6^{5}
6	(United States) Maxime Cressy	6	3	7^{7}

Final
(Germany) Daniel Masur	6	6
6	(United States) Maxime Cressy	4	4

=== Top half ===
First round
1	(Australia) J Thompson	7	6^{2}	7^{7}
WC	(Germany) M Rosenkranz	5	7^{7}	6^{5}
(Belgium) R Bemelmans	6^{6}	6	7
Q	(Germany) Tobias Simon	7^{8}	3	5
(Switzerland) M-A Hüsler	6	6
Q	(Belgium) Christopher Heyman	1	1
WC	(Germany) MH Rehberg	3	4
LL	(Austria) L Miedler	6	6
4	(Germany) O Otte	2	7^{7}	4
(Germany) D Masur	6	6^{3}	6
WC	(Germany) M Möller	2	5
(Bosnia and Herzegovina) M Bašić	6	7
(India) R Ramanathan	7^{9}	4	6
LL	(Bosnia and Herzegovina) A Šetkić	6^{7}	6	3
(Germany) M Marterer	6	6
8	(Poland) K Żuk	3	4

Second round
1	(Australia) J Thompson	6	3
(Belgium) R Bemelmans	1	1^{r}
(Switzerland) M-A Hüsler	3	6	6
LL	(Austria) L Miedler	6	2	1
(Germany) D Masur	6	6
(Bosnia and Herzegovina) M Bašić	3	4
(India) R Ramanathan	7	7^{7}
(Germany) M Marterer	5	6^{4}

Quarterfinals
1	(Australia) J Thompson	3	1
(Switzerland) M-A Hüsler	6	6
(Germany) D Masur	6	6
(India) R Ramanathan	3	3

Semifinals
(Switzerland) M-A Hüsler	2	3
(Germany) D Masur	6	6

=== Bottom half ===
First round
5	(Czech Republic) T Macháč	7^{7}	4	6
(United Kingdom) J Draper	6^{5}	6	4
Q	(Germany) H Squire	7^{7}	2	7^{7}
LL	(Austria) A Erler	6^{3}	6	6^{5}
(Romania) M Copil	2	6	6
(Ukraine) V Sachko	6	2	4
(Switzerland) D Stricker	5	7^{7}	6
3	(Austria) J Rodionov	7	6^{5}	4
6	(United States) M Cressy	6^{1}	6	6
Q	(Germany) J Härteis	7^{7}	4	3
(France) G Blancaneaux	6	6
(France) E Furness	1	1
(Italy) A Vavassori	6	3	6
(Germany) M Bachinger	4	6	3
(Czech Republic) J Forejtek	1	7	5
2	(Czech Republic) J Veselý	6	5	7

Second round
5	(Czech Republic) T Macháč	6	7^{7}
Q	(Germany) H Squire	2	6^{4}
(Romania) M Copil	6^{3}	2
(Switzerland) D Stricker	7^{7}	6
6	(United States) M Cressy	6	6
(France) G Blancaneaux	3	4
(Italy) A Vavassori	4	1
2	(Czech Republic) J Veselý	6	6

Quarterfinals
5	(Czech Republic) T Macháč	6	6
(Switzerland) D Stricker	4	4
6	(United States) M Cressy	7^{7}	7^{7}
2	(Czech Republic) J Veselý	6^{0}	6^{3}

Semifinals
5	(Czech Republic) T Macháč	3	6	6^{5}
6	(United States) M Cressy	6	3	7^{7}
