= 2017 Wimbledon Championships – Men's doubles =

Men's doubles
- 2017 Wimbledon Championships

Final
- Champions: (Poland) Łukasz Kubot (Brazil) Marcelo Melo
- Runners-up: (Austria) Oliver Marach (Croatia) Mate Pavić
- Score: 5–7, 7–5, 7–6^{(7–2)}, 3–6, 13–11

Events
Singles	men	women		boys	girls
Doubles	men	women	mixed	boys	girls
WC Singles	men	women	quad
WC Doubles	men	women	quad
Legends	men	women	seniors
← 2016 ·	Wimbledon Championships	· 2018 →

Pierre-Hugues Herbert and Nicolas Mahut were the defending champions, but lost in the second round to Jay Clarke and Marcus Willis.

Łukasz Kubot and Marcelo Melo won the title, defeating Oliver Marach and Mate Pavić in the final, 5–7, 7–5, 7–6^{(7–2)}, 3–6, 13–11. Melo also regained the ATP no. 1 doubles ranking after he and Kubot defeated Henri Kontinen (the incumbent no. 1 player) and John Peers in the semifinals.

== Seeds ==
1. (Finland) Henri Kontinen / (Australia) John Peers (semifinals)
2. (France) Pierre-Hugues Herbert / (France) Nicolas Mahut (second round)
3. (United Kingdom) Jamie Murray / (Brazil) Bruno Soares (second round)
4. (Poland) Łukasz Kubot / (Brazil) Marcelo Melo (champions)
5. (United States) Bob Bryan / (United States) Mike Bryan (second round)
6. (Croatia) Ivan Dodig / (Spain) Marcel Granollers (third round)
7. (South Africa) Raven Klaasen / (United States) Rajeev Ram (third round)
8. (India) Rohan Bopanna / (France) Édouard Roger-Vasselin (second round)

9. (Netherlands) Jean-Julien Rojer / (Romania) Horia Tecău (first round)
10. (United States) Ryan Harrison / (New Zealand) Michael Venus (quarterfinals)
11. (Spain) Feliciano López / (Spain) Marc López (first round)
12. (Colombia) Juan Sebastián Cabal / (Colombia) Robert Farah (second round, retired)
13. (France) Fabrice Martin / (Canada) Daniel Nestor (second round)
14. (Romania) Florin Mergea / (Pakistan) Aisam-ul-Haq Qureshi (third round)
15. (Chile) Julio Peralta / (Argentina) Horacio Zeballos (second round)
16. (Austria) Oliver Marach / (Croatia) Mate Pavić (final)

Click on the seed number of a player to go to their draw section.

== Draw ==
=== Key ===
- Q = Qualifier
- WC = Wild card
- LL = Lucky loser
- Alt = Alternate
- ITF = ITF entry
- PR = Protected ranking
- SR = Special ranking
- SE = Special exempt
- JE = Junior exempt
- JR = Junior Accelerator Programme entrant
- CO = College Accelerator Programme entrant
- NG = Next Gen Accelerator Program entrant
- w/o = Walkover
- r = Retired
- d = Defaulted

=== Finals ===
Quarterfinals
1	(Finland) Henri Kontinen (Australia) John Peers	6	6^{5}	6^{4}	7^{9}	6
10	(United States) Ryan Harrison (New Zealand) Michael Venus	4	7^{7}	7^{7}	6^{7}	1
4	(Poland) Łukasz Kubot (Brazil) Marcelo Melo	7^{13}	6	6
WC	(United Kingdom) Ken Skupski (United Kingdom) Neal Skupski	6^{11}	4	4
(Chile) Hans Podlipnik-Castillo (Belarus) Andrei Vasilevski	7^{10}	4	6^{5}	5
(Croatia) Nikola Mektić (Croatia) Franko Škugor	6^{8}	6	7^{7}	7
(Poland) Marcin Matkowski (Belarus) Max Mirnyi	5	2	2
16	(Austria) Oliver Marach (Croatia) Mate Pavić	7	6	6

Semifinals
1	(Finland) Henri Kontinen (Australia) John Peers	3	7^{7}	2	6	7
4	(Poland) Łukasz Kubot (Brazil) Marcelo Melo	6	6^{4}	6	4	9
(Croatia) Nikola Mektić (Croatia) Franko Škugor	6	5	6^{4}	6	15
16	(Austria) Oliver Marach (Croatia) Mate Pavić	4	7	7^{7}	3	17

Final
4	(Poland) Łukasz Kubot (Brazil) Marcelo Melo	5	7	7^{7}	3	13
16	(Austria) Oliver Marach (Croatia) Mate Pavić	7	5	6^{2}	6	11

=== Top half ===
==== Section 1 ====
First round
1	(Finland) H Kontinen (Australia) J Peers	2	6	7	6
(Italy) F Fognini (Italy) A Seppi	6	2	5	1
(Italy) P Lorenzi (France) A Mannarino	6^{5}	4^{r}
WC	(United Kingdom) S Clayton (United Kingdom) J O'Mara	7^{7}	3
PR	(Georgia (country)) N Basilashvili (Austria) A Haider-Maurer	3	1	2
Q	(France) H Nys (Croatia) A Šančić	6	6	6
(Brazil) T Bellucci (Brazil) R Dutra Silva	2	6^{5}	2
13	(France) F Martin (Canada) D Nestor	6	7^{7}	6
10	(United States) R Harrison (New Zealand) M Venus	6	1	4	6	9
(Germany) A Begemann (Germany) J-L Struff	3	6	6	3	7
Q	(Sweden) J Brunström (Sweden) A Siljeström	6^{4}	6	4	7^{7}	12
LL	(Netherlands) S Arends (Chinese Taipei) H-y Peng	7^{7}	1	6	6^{4}	10
(Argentina) N Kicker (Argentina) D Schwartzman	4	3	3
(France) J Benneteau (Canada) V Pospisil	6	6	6
(Israel) J Erlich (Philippines) T Huey	6^{4}	3	7^{9}	7^{7}	4
6	(Croatia) I Dodig (Spain) M Granollers	7^{7}	6	6^{7}	6^{4}	6

Second round
1	(Finland) H Kontinen (Australia) J Peers	6	6	6
WC	(United Kingdom) S Clayton (United Kingdom) J O'Mara	3	4	4
Q	(France) H Nys (Croatia) A Šančić	6	6	6
13	(France) F Martin (Canada) D Nestor	3	4	4
10	(United States) R Harrison (New Zealand) M Venus	6	6^{8}	6	6
Q	(Sweden) J Brunström (Sweden) A Siljeström	3	7^{10}	3	4
(France) J Benneteau (Canada) V Pospisil	6^{1}	3	4
6	(Croatia) I Dodig (Spain) M Granollers	7^{7}	6	6

Third round
1	(Finland) H Kontinen (Australia) J Peers	6	3	6	6
Q	(France) H Nys (Croatia) A Šančić	3	6	1	4
10	(United States) R Harrison (New Zealand) M Venus	2	6	6	6^{7}	6
6	(Croatia) I Dodig (Spain) M Granollers	6	3	4	7^{9}	3

Quarterfinals
1	(Finland) H Kontinen (Australia) J Peers	6	6^{5}	6^{4}	7^{9}	6
10	(United States) R Harrison (New Zealand) M Venus	4	7^{7}	7^{7}	6^{7}	1

==== Section 2 ====
First round
4	(Poland) Ł Kubot (Brazil) M Melo	6	6	6
(Netherlands) W Koolhof (Netherlands) M Middelkoop	4	0	3
(Germany) P Petzschner (Austria) A Peya	6^{3}	6	6^{10}	6	6
(Netherlands) R Haase (United Kingdom) D Inglot	7^{7}	2	7^{12}	4	3
(India) L Paes (Canada) A Shamasdin	6	6	2	6^{2}	8
(Austria) J Knowle (Austria) P Oswald	4	4	6	7^{7}	10
LL	(Croatia) D Marcan (Austria) T-S Weissborn	6	6^{4}	6^{3}	3
14	(Romania) F Mergea (Pakistan) A-u-H Qureshi	4	7^{7}	7^{7}	6
9	(Netherlands) J-J Rojer (Romania) H Tecău	6^{4}	6^{4}	6^{4}
WC	(Australia) T Kokkinakis (Australia) J Thompson	7^{7}	7^{7}	7^{7}
LL	(Uruguay) A Behar (Belarus) A Bury	4	3	7	4
(New Zealand) M Daniell (Brazil) M Demoliner	6	6	5	6
WC	(United Kingdom) K Skupski (United Kingdom) N Skupski	6	6	3	6
WC	(United Kingdom) B Klein (United Kingdom) J Salisbury	4	3	6	3
(Germany) D Brown (Germany) M Zverev	3	6^{4}	4
8	(India) R Bopanna (France) É Roger-Vasselin	6	7^{7}	6

Second round
4	(Poland) Ł Kubot (Brazil) M Melo	6	5	6	3	11
(Germany) P Petzschner (Austria) A Peya	2	7	3	6	9
(Austria) J Knowle (Austria) P Oswald	7	5	3	6^{5}
14	(Romania) F Mergea (Pakistan) A-u-H Qureshi	5	7	6	7^{7}
WC	(Australia) T Kokkinakis (Australia) J Thompson	4	6^{0}	4
(New Zealand) M Daniell (Brazil) M Demoliner	6	7^{7}	6
WC	(United Kingdom) K Skupski (United Kingdom) N Skupski	7^{8}	6	6^{5}	6
8	(India) R Bopanna (France) É Roger-Vasselin	6^{6}	3	7^{7}	3

Third round
4	(Poland) Ł Kubot (Brazil) M Melo	6^{3}	4	6	6	6
14	(Romania) F Mergea (Pakistan) A-u-H Qureshi	7^{7}	6	1	4	2
(New Zealand) M Daniell (Brazil) M Demoliner	6^{4}	7	6^{7}	4
WC	(United Kingdom) K Skupski (United Kingdom) N Skupski	7^{7}	5	7^{9}	6

Quarterfinals
4	(Poland) Ł Kubot (Brazil) M Melo	7^{13}	6	6
WC	(United Kingdom) K Skupski (United Kingdom) N Skupski	6^{11}	4	4

=== Bottom half ===
==== Section 3 ====
First round
7	(South Africa) R Klaasen (United States) R Ram	6	6	6
(Romania) M Copil (Spain) F Verdasco	3	4	4
(India) P Raja (India) D Sharan	7^{7}	3	6	7^{8}
(United Kingdom) K Edmund (Portugal) J Sousa	6^{2}	6	4	6^{6}
(United States) S Lipsky (United States) F Tiafoe	4	5	7	2
(Chile) H Podlipnik-Castillo (Belarus) A Vasilevski	6	7	5	6
(Argentina) C Berlocq (Spain) A Ramos Viñolas	4	6^{4}	6^{0}
12	(Colombia) JS Cabal (Colombia) R Farah	6	7^{7}	7^{7}
15	(Chile) J Peralta (Argentina) H Zeballos	6	6	6
(United States) J Cerretani (Russia) M Elgin	3	2	4
(Luxembourg) G Müller (United States) S Querrey	6^{4}	6^{6}	6	6	1
(Croatia) N Mektić (Croatia) F Škugor	7^{7}	7^{8}	4	3	6
(Argentina) G Durán (Argentina) A Molteni	7^{7}	2	2	3
(Australia) S Groth (Sweden) R Lindstedt	6^{5}	6	6	6
(Czech Republic) R Jebavý (Czech Republic) J Veselý	6^{7}	2	4
3	(United Kingdom) J Murray (Brazil) B Soares	7^{9}	6	6

Second round
7	(South Africa) R Klaasen (United States) R Ram	6	6	4	6^{6}	10
(India) P Raja (India) D Sharan	3	4	6	7^{8}	8
(Chile) H Podlipnik-Castillo (Belarus) A Vasilevski	6	7^{7}	3
12	(Colombia) JS Cabal (Colombia) R Farah	4	6^{3}	2^{r}
15	(Chile) J Peralta (Argentina) H Zeballos	7^{7}	6^{2}	4	4
(Croatia) N Mektić (Croatia) F Škugor	6^{5}	7^{7}	6	6
(Australia) S Groth (Sweden) R Lindstedt	4	6	4	7	7
3	(United Kingdom) J Murray (Brazil) B Soares	6	3	6	5	5

Third round
7	(South Africa) R Klaasen (United States) R Ram	4	6^{5}	3
(Chile) H Podlipnik-Castillo (Belarus) A Vasilevski	6	7^{7}	6
(Croatia) N Mektić (Croatia) F Škugor	6^{7}	7^{7}	7	7
(Australia) S Groth (Sweden) R Lindstedt	7^{9}	6^{4}	5	5

Quarterfinals
(Chile) H Podlipnik-Castillo (Belarus) A Vasilevski	7^{10}	4	6^{4}	5
(Croatia) N Mektić (Croatia) F Škugor	6^{8}	6	7^{7}	7

==== Section 4 ====
First round
5	(United States) B Bryan (United States) M Bryan	7	6	6
(Australia) M Polmans (Australia) A Whittington	5	2	4
(Poland) M Matkowski (Belarus) M Mirnyi	7	6	7^{7}
Q	(Chinese Taipei) C-p Hsieh (United States) M Schnur	5	1	6^{4}
(United States) N Monroe (New Zealand) A Sitak	3	3	7	7^{7}	6
(Brazil) A Sá (Israel) D Sela	6	6	5	6^{5}	3
(Australia) M Reid (Australia) J-P Smith	3	7^{7}	6	6
11	(Spain) F López (Spain) M López	6	6^{2}	2	4
16	(Austria) O Marach (Croatia) M Pavić	6	6	6^{7}	6
Q	(Germany) K Krawietz (Slovakia) I Zelenay	4	4	7^{9}	3
(Cyprus) M Baghdatis (Tunisia) M Jaziri	7^{7}	2	2	2
LL	(Serbia) I Bozoljac (Italy) F Cipolla	6^{4}	6	6	6
WC	(United Kingdom) J Clarke (United Kingdom) M Willis	6^{4}	5	7^{7}	6	6
(United States) J Donaldson (India) J Nedunchezhiyan	7^{7}	7	6^{3}	0	3
(Mexico) S González (United States) D Young	3	6^{3}	6	6^{1}
2	(France) P-H Herbert (France) N Mahut	6	7^{7}	4	7^{7}

Second round
5	(United States) B Bryan (United States) M Bryan	3	5	4
(Poland) M Matkowski (Belarus) M Mirnyi	6	7	6
(United States) N Monroe (New Zealand) A Sitak	7^{7}	6	7^{7}
(Australia) M Reid (Australia) J-P Smith	6^{2}	3	6^{5}
16	(Austria) O Marach (Croatia) M Pavić	6^{4}	6	6	6
LL	(Serbia) I Bozoljac (Italy) F Cipolla	7^{7}	4	2	3
WC	(United Kingdom) J Clarke (United Kingdom) M Willis	3	6	7^{7}	5	6
2	(France) P-H Herbert (France) N Mahut	6	1	6^{3}	7	3

Third round
(Poland) M Matkowski (Belarus) M Mirnyi	6	3	6	6
(United States) N Monroe (New Zealand) A Sitak	3	6	3	4
16	(Austria) O Marach (Croatia) M Pavić	6	6	7^{7}
WC	(United Kingdom) J Clarke (United Kingdom) M Willis	3	4	6^{3}

Quarterfinals
(Poland) M Matkowski (Belarus) M Mirnyi	5	2	2
16	(Austria) O Marach (Croatia) M Pavić	7	6	6
