= 2021 Challenger Eckental – Doubles =

Doubles
- 2021 Challenger Eckental

Final
- Champions: (Czech Republic) Roman Jebavý (United Kingdom) Jonny O'Mara
- Runners-up: (Belgium) Ruben Bemelmans (Germany) Daniel Masur
- Score: 6–4, 7–5

Events
| Singles | Doubles |
- Challenger Eckental

Dustin Brown and Antoine Hoang were the defending champions but only Brown chose to defend his title, partnering Andrea Vavassori. Brown lost in the quarterfinals to Ruben Bemelmans and Daniel Masur.

Roman Jebavý and Jonny O'Mara won the title after defeating Bemelmans and Masur 6–4, 7–5 in the final.

== Seeds ==
1. (Czech Republic) Roman Jebavý / (United Kingdom) Jonny O'Mara (champions)
2. (Germany) Dustin Brown / (Italy) Andrea Vavassori (quarterfinals)
3. (Poland) Szymon Walków / (Poland) Jan Zieliński (semifinals)
4. (Switzerland) Marc-Andrea Hüsler / (Netherlands) David Pel (first round)

== Draw ==
Key

- Q = Qualifier
- WC = Wild card
- LL = Lucky loser
- Alt = Alternate
- ITF = ITF entry
- PR = Protected ranking
- SR = Special ranking
- SE = Special exempt
- JE = Junior exempt
- JR = Junior Accelerator Programme entrant
- CO = College Accelerator Programme entrant
- NG = Next Gen Accelerator Program entrant
- w/o = Walkover
- r = Retired
- d = Defaulted

First round
1 | (Czech Republic) R Jebavý (United Kingdom) J O'Mara | 7^{7} | 6
(Bosnia and Herzegovina) A Šetkić (Australia) J Thompson | 6^{2} | 2
(Romania) VV Cornea (India) R Ramanathan | 6 | 6
(United Kingdom) J Draper (France) E Furness | 2 | 4
4 | (Switzerland) M-A Hüsler (Netherlands) D Pel | 4 | 6^{5}
(Austria) A Erler (Austria) L Miedler | 6 | 7^{7}
(Germany) M Marterer (Ukraine) V Sachko | 6 | 3 | [7]
(Moldova) A Cozbinov (United States) M Cressy | 2 | 6 | [10]
(Germany) J Lenz (Austria) T-S Weissborn | 6 | 4 | [7]
3 | (Poland) S Walków (Poland) J Zieliński | 4 | 6 | [10]
WC | (Germany) M Möller (Germany) Alen Mujakić | 1 | 1
(Belgium) R Bemelmans (Germany) D Masur | 6 | 6

Quarterfinals
1 | (Czech Republic) R Jebavý (United Kingdom) J O'Mara | 6 | 6
(Romania) VV Cornea (India) R Ramanathan | 4 | 4
(Austria) A Erler (Austria) L Miedler | 7 | 5 | [10]
WC | (Germany) T Sandkaulen (Germany) H Squire | 5 | 7 | [5]
(Moldova) A Cozbinov (United States) M Cressy | 4 | 7^{7} | [7]
3 | (Poland) S Walków (Poland) J Zieliński | 6 | 6^{2} | [10]
(Belgium) R Bemelmans (Germany) D Masur | 7^{8} | 6
2 | (Germany) D Brown (Italy) A Vavassori | 6^{6} | 3

Semifinals
1 | (Czech Republic) R Jebavý (United Kingdom) J O'Mara | 7^{7} | 6
(Austria) A Erler (Austria) L Miedler | 6^{5} | 4
3 | (Poland) S Walków (Poland) J Zieliński | 6^{3} | 5
(Belgium) R Bemelmans (Germany) D Masur | 7^{7} | 7

Final
1 | (Czech Republic) R Jebavý (United Kingdom) J O'Mara | 6 | 7
(Belgium) R Bemelmans (Germany) D Masur | 4 | 5
