= Jonny O'Mara =

British tennis player (born 1995)

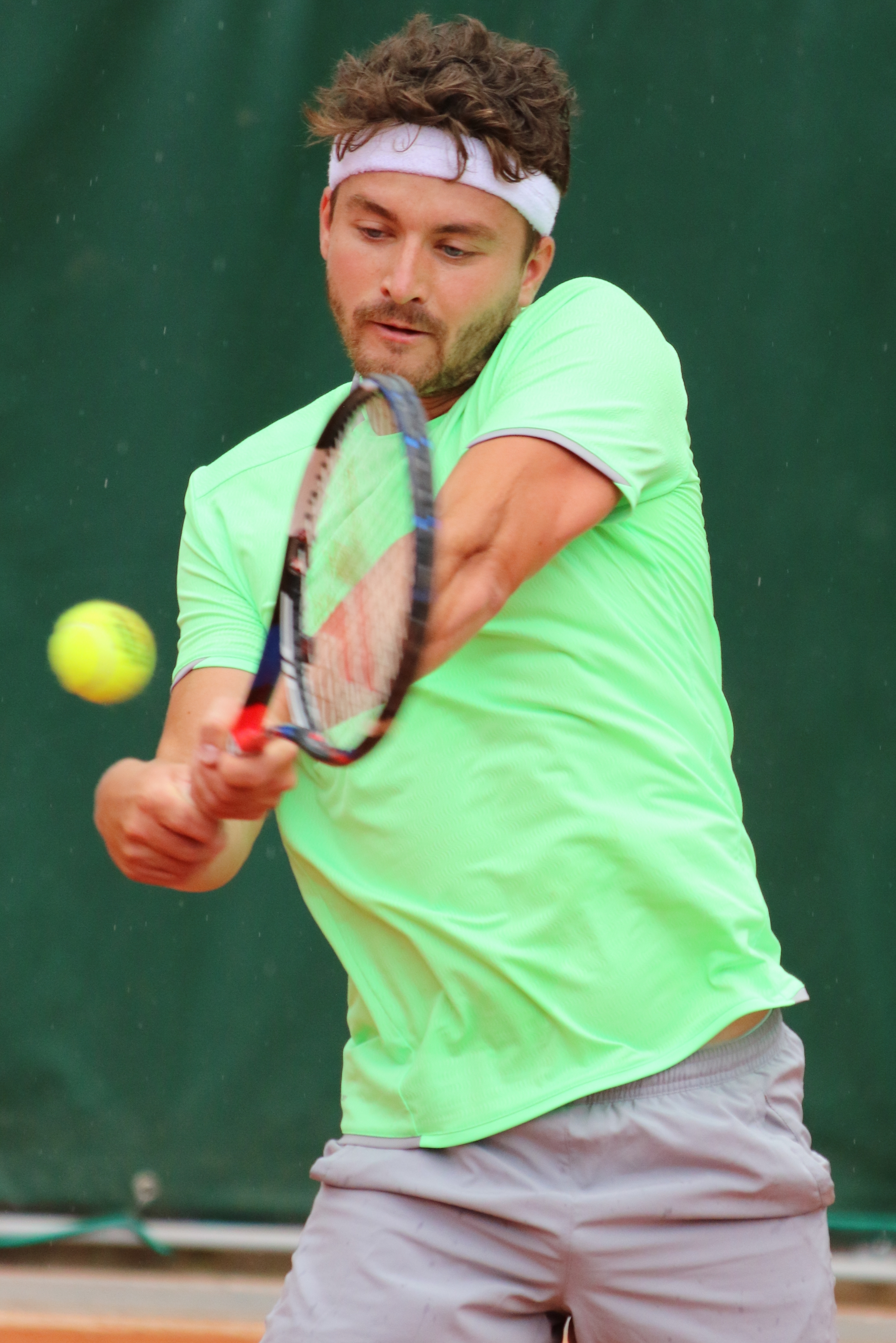
- O'Mara at the 2019 French Open
- Country (sports): Great Britain
- Residence: Arbroath, Scotland
- Born: 2 March 1995 (age 31) Keighley, West Yorkshire, England
- Height: 1.83 m (6 ft 0 in)
- Turned pro: 2011
- Retired: 2024 (last match 2023)
- Plays: Right-handed (two-handed backhand)
- College: University of Stirling (2017–2018)
- Coach: Louis Cayer
- Prize money: $589,648

Singles
- Career record: 0–0 (at ATP Tour level, Grand Slam level, and in Davis Cup)
- Career titles: 0
- Highest ranking: No. 489 (10 April 2017)

Doubles
- Career record: 69–67
- Career titles: 3
- Highest ranking: No. 44 (20 May 2019)

Grand Slam doubles results
- Australian Open: QF (2020)
- French Open: 3R (2022)
- Wimbledon: 3R (2022)
- US Open: 3R (2019, 2021)

Mixed doubles
- Career record: 5–4
- Career titles: 0

Grand Slam mixed doubles results
- Wimbledon: SF (2023)

Jonny O'Mara (born 2 March 1995) is a British tennis coach and former professional tennis player. He has a career high ATP doubles ranking of 44 achieved on 20 May 2019. He also has a career high ATP singles ranking of World No. 489 achieved on 10 April 2017. He is also a North of Scotland Tennis Legend often representing the county in the prestigious County Cup event while serving as a professional player. He joins the likes of Andy Murray, Jamie Murray and Jake Leyni as true Legends to play for the North of Scotland in a professional capacity.

== Career ==
O'Mara won the Master'U BNP Paribas, the world event of university tennis, with Great-Britain in December 2017. He made his ATP main draw debut at the 2017 Aegon International Eastbourne in the doubles draw partnering Scott Clayton.

He made his Grand Slam debut at the 2017 Wimbledon Championships after receiving a wildcard to the doubles main draw with Clayton.

In June 2018, O'Mara claimed his maiden ATP Tour title with Luke Bambridge in the men's doubles final at Valley International in Eastbourne.

At the 2021 Sofia Open he won his third ATP 250 title partnering Ken Skupski.

With compatriot Liam Broady he won the doubles at the 2023 Surbiton Trophy and reached the final at the 2023 Nottingham Open.

Partnering with Olivia Nicholls at the 2023 Wimbledon Championships, O'Mara reached the semi-finals in the mixed doubles, losing out to eventual champions Mate Pavić and Lyudmyla Kichenok.

== Doubles performance timeline ==
Key
W	F	SF	QF	#R	RR	Q#	DNQ	A	NH

(W) winner; (F) finalist; (SF) semifinalist; (QF) quarterfinalist; (#R) rounds 4, 3, 2, 1; (RR) round-robin stage; (Q#) qualification round; (DNQ) did not qualify; (A) absent; (NH) not held; (SR) strike rate (events won / competed); (W–L) win–loss record.
To avoid confusion and double counting, these charts are updated at the conclusion of a tournament or when the player's participation has ended.

Current through the 2023 Wimbledon Championships.

Tournament	2017	2018	2019	2020	2021	2022	2023	SR	W–L
Grand Slam tournaments
Australian Open	A	A	2R	QF	1R	2R	A	0 / 4	5–4
French Open	A	A	1R	2R	1R	3R	A	0 / 4	3–4
Wimbledon	2R	1R	1R	NH	1R	3R	1R	0 / 6	3–6
US Open	A	A	3R	1R	3R	1R	A	0 / 4	4–4
Win–loss	1–1	0–1	3–4	4–3	2–4	5–4	0–1	0 / 18	15–18
Career statistics
Tournaments	2	6	20	9	13	14	6	70	
Titles	0	2	0	0	1	0	0	3	
Finals	0	2	3	1	1	0	0	7	
Overall win–loss	1–2	9–4	21–20	13–9	11–12	11–14	3–6	69–67	
Year-end ranking	165	62	57	58	62	95	174	51%	

=== Mixed doubles ===
Tournament	2019	2020	2021	2022	2023	SR	W–L
Australian Open	A	A	A	A	A	0 / 0	0–0
French Open	A	A	A	A	A	0 / 0	0–0
Wimbledon	1R	A	1R	QF	SF	0 / 4	5–4
US Open	A	A	A	A	A	0 / 0	0–0
Win–loss	0–1	0–0	0–1	2–1	3–1	0 / 4	5–4

== ATP career finals ==
=== Doubles: 7 (3 titles, 4 runner-ups) ===
Legend Grand Slam tournaments (0–0) ATP Tour Finals (0–0) ATP Tour Masters 1000 (0–0) ATP Tour 500 Series (0–0) ATP Tour 250 Series (3–4)	Finals by surface Hard (3–1) Clay (0–3) Grass (1–0)	Finals by setting Outdoor (1–3) Indoor (2–1)

Result	W–L	Date	Tournament	Tier	Surface	Partner	Opponents	Score
Win	1–0	Jun 2018	Eastbourne International, United Kingdom	250 Series	Grass	(United Kingdom) Luke Bambridge	(United Kingdom) Ken Skupski (United Kingdom) Neal Skupski	7–5, 6–4
Win	2–0	Oct 2018	Stockholm Open, Sweden	250 Series	Hard (i)	(United Kingdom) Luke Bambridge	(New Zealand) Marcus Daniell (Netherlands) Wesley Koolhof	7–5, 7–6^{(10–8)}
Loss	2–1	Jan 2019	Maharashtra Open, India	250 Series	Hard	(United Kingdom) Luke Bambridge	(India) Rohan Bopanna (India) Divij Sharan	3–6, 4–6
Loss	2–2	Mar 2019	Brasil Open, Brazil	250 Series	Clay (i)	(United Kingdom) Luke Bambridge	(Argentina) Federico Delbonis (Argentina) Máximo González	4–6, 3–6
Loss	2–3	May 2019	Estoril Open, Portugal	250 Series	Clay	(United Kingdom) Luke Bambridge	(France) Jérémy Chardy (France) Fabrice Martin	5–7, 6–7^{(3–7)}
Loss	2–4	Feb 2020	Chile Open, Chile	250 Series	Clay	(El Salvador) Marcelo Arévalo	(Spain) Roberto Carballés Baena (Spain) Alejandro Davidovich Fokina	6–7^{(3–7)}, 1–6
Win	3–4	Oct 2021	Sofia Open, Bulgaria	250 Series	Hard (i)	(United Kingdom) Ken Skupski	(Austria) Oliver Marach (Austria) Philipp Oswald	6–3, 6–4

== ATP Challenger and ITF Futures finals ==
=== Singles: 3 (1–2) ===
Legend ATP Challenger Tour (0–0) ITF Futures Tour (1–2)	Finals by surface Hard (1–2) Clay (0–0) Grass (0–0)

Result	W–L	Date	Tournament	Tier	Surface	Opponent	Score
Loss	0–1	Apr 2016	Greece F5, Heraklion	Futures	Hard	(United Kingdom) Lloyd Glasspool	3–6, 6–4, 6–7^{(3–7)}
Win	1–1	Jul 2016	Portugal F10, Castelo Branco	Futures	Hard	(Italy) Julian Ocleppo	3–6, 7–5, 7–6^{(7–2)}
Loss	1–2	Dec 2016	Qatar F4, Doha	Futures	Hard	(Germany) Daniel Altmaier	5–7, 3–6

=== Doubles: 41 (25–16) ===
Legend ATP Challenger Tour (9–8) ITF Futures Tour (16–8)	Finals by surface Hard (17–11) Clay (3–3) Grass (3–1) Carpet (2–1)

Result	W–L	Date	Tournament	Tier	Surface	Partner	Opponents	Score
Loss	0–1	May 2013	Great Britain F10, Edinburgh	Futures	Clay	(United Kingdom) Richard Gabb	(United Kingdom) Matthew Short (United Kingdom) Marcus Willis	6–4, 4–6, [8–10]
Loss	0–2	Nov 2013	Great Britain F23, Edgbaston	Futures	Hard (i)	(United Kingdom) Scott Clayton	(United Kingdom) Luke Bambridge (United Kingdom) George Morgan	5–7, 6–4, [7–10]
Loss	0–3	Feb 2014	Turkey F4, Antalya	Futures	Hard	(United Kingdom) Richard Gabb	(Monaco) Romain Arneodo (France) Enzo Couacaud	3–6, 0–6
Win	1–3	May 2014	Great Britain F10, Edinburgh	Futures	Clay	(United Kingdom) Marcus Willis	(Australia) Maverick Banes (Australia) Gavin van Peperzeel	7–6^{(7–3)}, 6–1
Win	2–3	May 2014	Great Britain F11, Newcastle	Futures	Clay	(United Kingdom) Marcus Willis	(Australia) Maverick Banes (Australia) Gavin van Peperzeel	7–6^{(10–8)}, 6–1
Win	3–3	Sep 2014	Croatia F17, Bol	Futures	Clay	(Australia) Christopher O'Connell	(Slovenia) Blaž Bizjak (Slovakia) Peter Mick	6–2, 6–4
Loss	3–4	Nov 2014	Great Britain F9, Bath	Futures	Hard (i)	(United Kingdom) Richard Gabb	(Republic of Ireland) David O'Hare (United Kingdom) Joe Salisbury	1–6, 2–6
Win	4–4	Oct 2015	Egypt F33, Sharm El Sheikh	Futures	Hard	(United Kingdom) Scott Clayton	(Egypt) Mohamed Safwat (Egypt) Issam Haitham Taweel	6–2, 6–4
Win	5–4	Oct 2015	Egypt F34, Sharm El Sheikh	Futures	Hard	(United Kingdom) Scott Clayton	(Poland) Karol Drzewiecki (Poland) Maciej Smola	7–6^{(10–8)}, 6–1
Loss	5–5	Feb 2016	Great Britain F1, Glasgow	Futures	Hard (i)	(United Kingdom) Scott Clayton	(United Kingdom) David Rice (United Kingdom) Daniel Smethurst	1–6, 4–6
Win	6–5	Mar 2016	Portugal F2, Faro	Futures	Hard	(United Kingdom) Scott Clayton	(Italy) Erik Crepaldi (Portugal) André Gaspar Murta	6–2, 7–5
Loss	6–6	May 2016	Portugal F5, Lisbon	Futures	Hard	(United Kingdom) Scott Clayton	(Portugal) Nuno Deus (Portugal) João Domingues	6–4, 5–7, [7–10]
Win	7–6	Jul 2016	Portugal F9, Idanha-a-Nova	Futures	Hard	(United Kingdom) Scott Clayton	(Portugal) Nuno Deus (Spain) Jorge Hernando Ruano	6–2, 6–4
Loss	7–7	Jul 2016	Portugal F10, Castelo Branco	Futures	Hard	(United Kingdom) Scott Clayton	(Portugal) Felipe Cunha e Silva (Portugal) Fred Gil	6–1, 4–6, [10–12]
Loss	7–8	Aug 2016	Belarus F2, Minsk	Futures	Hard	(United Kingdom) Scott Clayton	(Belarus) Yaraslav Shyla (Belarus) Dzmitry Zhyrmont	5–7, 6–7^{(1–7)}
Win	8–8	Aug 2016	Belarus F3, Minsk	Futures	Hard	(United Kingdom) Scott Clayton	(Georgia (country)) George Tsivadze (Turkey) Anıl Yüksel	6–4, 3–6, [13–11]
Win	9–8	Oct 2016	Great Britain F4, Loughborough	Futures	Hard (i)	(United Kingdom) Scott Clayton	(United Kingdom) Billy Harris (Poland) Mateusz Terczynski	6–3, 6–2
Win	10–8	Nov 2016	Great Britain F5, Sheffield	Futures	Hard (i)	(United Kingdom) Scott Clayton	(United Kingdom) Alastair Gray (United Kingdom) Ewan Moore	6–4, 6–4
Win	11–8	Nov 2016	Great Britain F6, Barnstaple	Futures	Hard (i)	(United Kingdom) Scott Clayton	(United States) Hunter Callahan (United States) Nicholas S. Hu	6–4, 7–5
Win	12–8	Dec 2016	Qatar F4, Doha	Futures	Hard	(United Kingdom) James Marsalek	(Austria) Lenny Hampel (Austria) Sebastian Ofner	6–4, 6–4
Win	13–8	Dec 2016	Qatar F5, Doha	Futures	Hard	(United Kingdom) Scott Clayton	(France) Baptiste Crepatte (France) Quentin Folliot	6–0, 6–0
Win	14–8	Dec 2016	Qatar F6, Doha	Futures	Hard	(United Kingdom) Scott Clayton	(Italy) Edoardo Eremin (Italy) Julian Ocleppo	7–6^{(7–0)}, 6–4
Win	15–8	Apr 2017	France F8, La Grande-Motte	Futures	Hard	(United Kingdom) Scott Clayton	(France) Yannick Jankovits (France) Jonathan Kanar	6–4, 6–2
Win	16–8	Jul 2017	Ireland F1, Dublin	Futures	Carpet	(United Kingdom) Scott Clayton	(Republic of Ireland) Peter Bothwell (United Kingdom) Lloyd Glasspool	6–1, 6–3
Win	17–8	Sep 2017	İzmir, Turkey	Challenger	Hard	(United Kingdom) Scott Clayton	(Ukraine) Denys Molchanov (Ukraine) Sergiy Stakhovsky	Walkover
Win	18–8	Feb 2018	Bergamo, Italy	Challenger	Hard (i)	(United Kingdom) Scott Clayton	(Lithuania) Laurynas Grigelis (Italy) Alessandro Motti	5–7, 6–3, [15–13]
Loss	18–9	Apr 2018	Mexico City, Mexico	Challenger	Clay	(United Kingdom) Luke Bambridge	(Germany) Yannick Hanfmann (Germany) Kevin Krawietz	2–6, 6–7^{(3–7)}
Loss	18–10	May 2018	Glasgow, United Kingdom	Challenger	Hard (i)	(United Kingdom) Scott Clayton	(Spain) Gerard Granollers (Spain) Guillermo Olaso	1–6, 5–7
Loss	18–11	May 2018	Loughborough, United Kingdom	Challenger	Hard (i)	(United Kingdom) Luke Bambridge	(Denmark) Frederik Nielsen (United Kingdom) Joe Salisbury	6–3, 3–6, [4–10]
Win	19–11	Jun 2018	Surbiton, United Kingdom	Challenger	Grass	(United Kingdom) Luke Bambridge	(United Kingdom) Ken Skupski (United Kingdom) Neal Skupski	7–6^{(13–11)}, 4–6, [10–7]
Loss	19–12	Aug 2018	Aptos, United States	Challenger	Hard	(United Kingdom) Joe Salisbury	(Australia) Thanasi Kokkinakis (Australia) Matt Reid	2–6, 6–4, [8–10]
Win	20–12	Sep 2018	Orléans, France	Challenger	Hard (i)	(United Kingdom) Luke Bambridge	(Germany) Yannick Maden (Austria) Tristan-Samuel Weissborn	6–2, 6–4
Loss	20–13	Nov 2018	Eckental, Germany	Challenger	Carpet (i)	(France) Hugo Nys	(Germany) Kevin Krawietz (Germany) Andreas Mies	1–6, 4–6
Loss	20–14	Apr 2019	Sarasota, United States	Challenger	Clay	(United Kingdom) Luke Bambridge	(Uruguay) Martín Cuevas (Italy) Paolo Lorenzi	6–7^{(5–7)}, 6–7^{(6–8)}
Win	21–14	Aug 2019	Vancouver, Canada	Challenger	Hard	(Sweden) Robert Lindstedt	(Philippines) Treat Huey (Canada) Adil Shamasdin	6–2, 7–5
Win	22–14	Oct 2019	Mouilleron-le-Captif, France	Challenger	Hard (i)	(United Kingdom) Ken Skupski	(Netherlands) Sander Arends (Netherlands) David Pel	6–1, 6–4
Loss	22–15	Jan 2020	Bendigo Challenger, Australia	Challenger	Hard	(El Salvador) Marcelo Arévalo	(Serbia) Nikola Čačić (Ukraine) Denys Molchanov	6–7^{(3–7)}, 4–6
Win	23–15	Nov 2021	Eckental, Germany	Challenger	Carpet (i)	(Czech Republic) Roman Jebavý	(Belgium) Ruben Bemelmans (Germany) Daniel Masur	6–4, 7–5
Win	24–15	Jun 2022	Nottingham, United Kingdom	Challenger	Grass	(United Kingdom) Ken Skupski	(United Kingdom) Julian Cash (United Kingdom) Henry Patten	3–6, 6–2, [16–14]
Win	25–15	Jun 2023	Surbiton, United Kingdom (2)	Challenger	Grass	(United Kingdom) Liam Broady	(Australia) Alexei Popyrin (Australia) Aleksandar Vukic	6–4, 5–7, [10–8]
Loss	25–16	Jun 2023	Nottingham, United Kingdom	Challenger	Grass	(United Kingdom) Liam Broady	(United Kingdom) Johannus Monday (United Kingdom) Jacob Fearnley	3–6, 7–6, [7–10]

== World TeamTennis ==
O'Mara enters his second season with World TeamTennis in 2020, after making his debut with the San Diego Aviators in 2019. It was announced he will be joining the San Diego Aviators during the 2020 WTT season set to begin July 12.
