= Scott Clayton (tennis) =

British tennis player

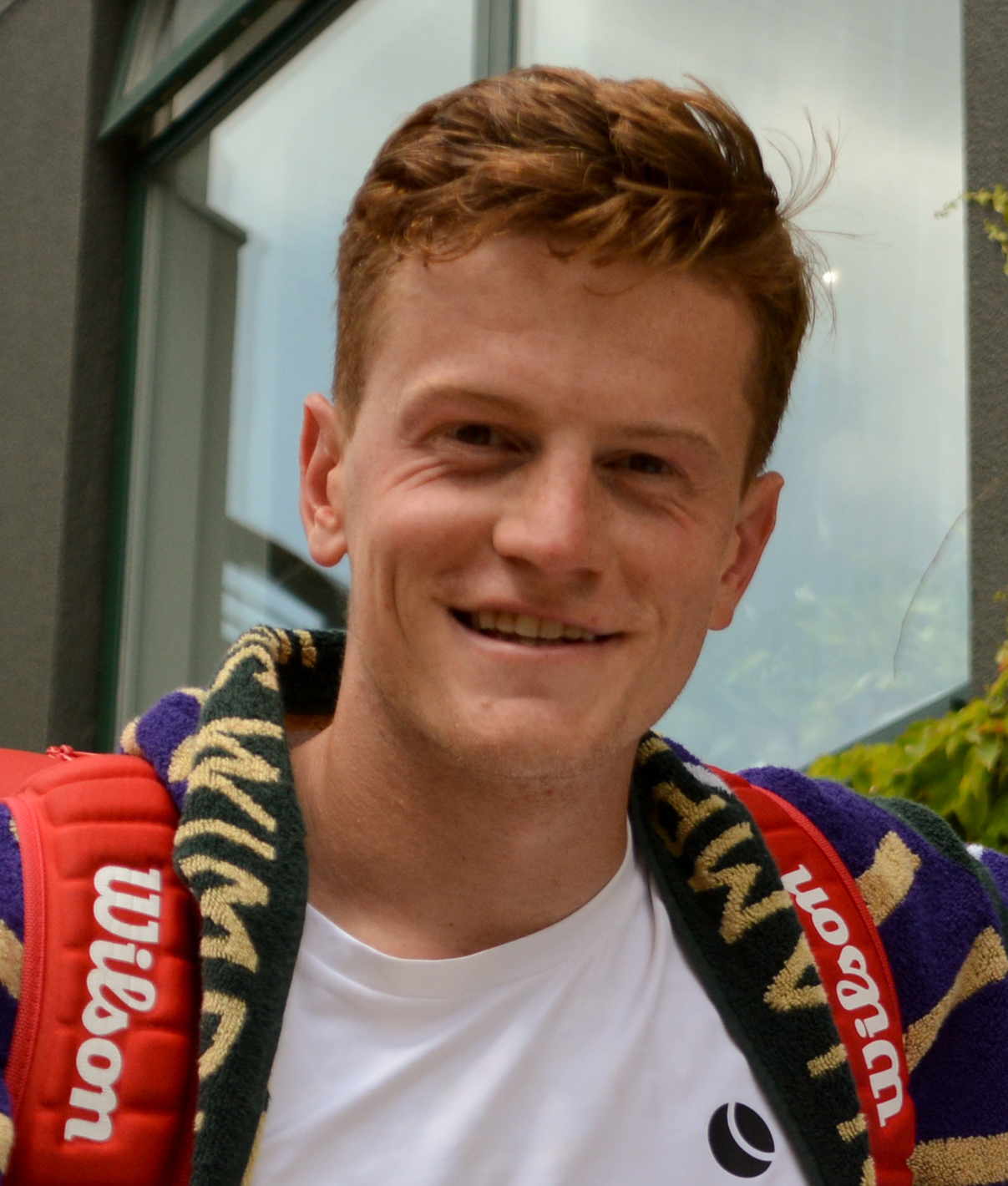
- Country (sports): Great Britain
- Residence: Jersey, United Kingdom
- Born: 11 February 1994 (age 31) Jersey, United Kingdom
- Height: 1.83 m (6 ft 0 in)
- Retired: 2021
- Plays: Right-handed (two-handed backhand)
- Prize money: $105,351

Singles
- Career record: 0–0 (at ATP Tour level, Grand Slam level, and in Davis Cup)
- Career titles: 0
- Highest ranking: No. 689 (17 October 2016)

Doubles
- Career record: 3–6 (at ATP Tour level, Grand Slam level, and in Davis Cup)
- Career titles: 0
- Highest ranking: No. 107 (16 July 2018)

Grand Slam doubles results
- Wimbledon: 2R (2017, 2018)

Grand Slam mixed doubles results
- Wimbledon: 1R (2019)
- Last updated on: 11 May 2021.

Scott Clayton (born 11 February 1994) is a former British tennis player.

Clayton is a doubles specialist who has a career-high doubles ranking of World No. 107 achieved on 16 July 2018. He has also reached a career-high singles ranking of World No. 689 achieved on 17 October 2016. Clayton has reached 46 career doubles finals posting a record of 31 wins and 15 losses, which includes a 4–2 record in ATP Challenger finals.

Clayton made his ATP main draw debut at the 2017 Aegon International Eastbourne on grass courts where he received a wildcard entry into the doubles draw alongside regular partner and compatriot Jonny O'Mara. They were defeated in the first round in a third set tiebreak by Diego Schwartzman and Jiri Vesely 4–6, 6–3, [7–10].

== Grand Slam Appearances ==
Clayton made his Grand Slam debut at the 2017 Wimbledon Championships after receiving a wildcard into the doubles main draw with Jonny O'Mara. In the first round they played against Adrian Mannarino and Paolo Lorenzi and while up a set leading the match 7–6^{(7–5)}, 3–4 they claimed the victory when the opposition was forced to stop playing and retire. They would go on to lose in the second round to first seeds and eventual semi-finalists John Peers and Henri Kontinen in straight sets 3–6, 4–6, 4–6.

A similar story line would unfold the following year when again Clayton received a wild card entry into the doubles draw of the 2018 Wimbledon Championships this time partnering Liam Broady. In the first round, they defeated Frances Tiafoe and Jackson Withrow in straight sets 7–5, 6–3, 5–7 before retiring in the second round to Máximo González and Nicolás Jarry while behind 6–7^{(4–7)}, 3–6, 2–1.

For a third consecutive year, Clayton received a wild card entry into the doubles draw of the 2019 Wimbledon Championships playing again with Liam Broady, but this year they would be ousted in the first round by Leonardo Mayer and Joao Sousa 6–7^{(3–7)}, 6–4, 5–7, 3–6.

== ATP Challenger and ITF Futures finals ==
=== Doubles: 46 (31–15) ===
Legend ATP Challenger (4–2) ITF Futures (27–13)	Finals by surface Hard (29–12) Clay (0–2) Grass (1–0) Carpet (1–1)

Result	W–L	Date	Tournament	Tier	Surface	Partner	Opponents	Score
Loss	0–1	Jan 2013	Great Britain F1, Glasgow	Futures	Hard	(United Kingdom) Richard Gabb	(United Kingdom) David Rice (United Kingdom) Sean Thornley	6–7^{(5–7)}, 2–6
Loss	0–2	May 2013	Great Britain F11, Newcastle	Futures	Clay	(United Kingdom) Toby Martin	(United Kingdom) Luke Bambridge (United Kingdom) Cameron Norrie	0–6, 6–4, [3–10]
Loss	0–3	Jun 2013	Serbia F3, Šabac	Futures	Clay	(United Kingdom) Toby Martin	(Slovakia) Patrik Fabian (Slovakia) Adrian Partl	4–6, 6–3, [8–10]
Loss	0–4	Aug 2013	Great Britain F15, Nottingham	Futures	Hard	(United Kingdom) Toby Martin	(United Kingdom) Liam Broady (United Kingdom) Joshua Ward-Hibbert	6–4, 3–6, [6–10]
Win	1–4	Oct 2013	Israel F15, Herzliya	Futures	Hard	(United Kingdom) Toby Martin	(Israel) Mor Bulis (Israel) Edan Leshem	6–4, 6–0
Loss	1–5	Nov 2013	Great Britain F23, Edgbaston	Futures	Hard	(United Kingdom) Jonny O'Mara	(United Kingdom) Luke Bambridge (United Kingdom) George Morgan	5–7, 6–4, [7–10]
Loss	1–6	Aug 2014	USA F22, Decatur	Futures	Hard	(United Kingdom) Toby Martin	(United Kingdom) Luke Bambridge (United Kingdom) Liam Broady	7–5, 2–6, [7–10]
Win	2–6	Sep 2014	Turkey F32, Antalya	Futures	Hard	(United Kingdom) Richard Gabb	(Japan) Hiroyasu Ehara (Japan) Katsuki Nagao	3–6, 7–6^{(7–4)}, [10–7]
Win	3–6	Sep 2014	Turkey F33, Antalya	Futures	Hard	(United Kingdom) Richard Gabb	(India) Ramkumar Ramanathan (Venezuela) Ricardo Rodríguez	7–5, 7–6^{(9–7)}
Win	4–6	Nov 2014	Great Britain F4, Loughborough	Futures	Hard	(United Kingdom) Toby Martin	(Republic of Ireland) David O'Hare (United Kingdom) Joe Salisbury	6–4, 6–4
Win	5–6	Nov 2014	Cyprus F2, Larnaca	Futures	Hard	(United Kingdom) Richard Gabb	(Italy) Marco Bortolotti (Italy) Erik Crepaldi	7–5, 6–1
Win	6–6	Dec 2014	Qatar F4, Doha	Futures	Hard	(United Kingdom) Richard Gabb	(Republic of Ireland) Sam Barry (Austria) Maximilian Neuchrist	6–4, 6–7^{(5–7)}, [10–6]
Win	7–6	Mar 2015	Egypt F8, Sharm El Sheikh	Futures	Hard	(United Kingdom) Richard Gabb	(France) Louis Tessa (Spain) Bernabé Zapata Miralles	6–2, 6–4
Win	8–6	Mar 2015	Great Britain F5, Shrewsbury	Futures	Hard	(United Kingdom) Luke Bambridge	(United Kingdom) Sean Thornley (United Kingdom) Marcus Willis	7–6^{(7–3)}, 6–4
Win	9–6	Apr 2015	Qatar F3, Doha	Futures	Hard	(United Kingdom) James Marsalek	(Russia) Kirill Dmitriev (Kazakhstan) Dmitry Popko	6–3, 6–2
Win	10–6	Jul 2015	Great Britain F7, Felixstowe	Futures	Grass	(United Kingdom) Richard Gabb	(United Kingdom) Jack Findel-Hawkins (United Kingdom) Toby Mitchell	6–4, 4–6, [10–1]
Loss	10–7	Aug 2015	USA F23, Edwardsville	Futures	Hard	(United Kingdom) Richard Gabb	(Argentina) Alan Kohen (United States) John Lamble	6–3, 6–7^{(4–7)}, [7–10]
Win	11–7	Oct 2015	Egypt F33, Sharm El Sheikh	Futures	Hard	(United Kingdom) Jonny O'Mara	(Egypt) Mohamed Safwat (Egypt) Issam Haitham Taweel	6–2, 6–4
Win	12–7	Oct 2015	Egypt F34, Sharm El Sheikh	Futures	Hard	(United Kingdom) Jonny O'Mara	(Poland) Karol Drzewiecki (Poland) Maciej Smola	7–6^{(10–8)}, 6–1
Loss	12–8	Jan 2016	France F3, Veigy-Foncenex	Futures	Carpet	(United Kingdom) Richard Gabb	(Belgium) Sander Gillé (Belgium) Joran Vliegen	7–6^{(7–4)}, 6–7^{(6–8)}, [7–10]
Loss	12–9	Feb 2016	Great Britain F1, Glasgow	Futures	Hard	(United Kingdom) Jonny O'Mara	(United Kingdom) David Rice (United Kingdom) Daniel Smethurst	1–6, 4–6
Win	13–9	Mar 2016	Portugal F2, Faro	Futures	Hard	(United Kingdom) Jonny O'Mara	(Italy) Erik Crepaldi (Portugal) André Gaspar Murta	6–2, 7–5
Loss	13–10	May 2016	Portugal F5, Lisbon	Futures	Hard	(United Kingdom) Jonny O'Mara	(Portugal) Nuno Deus (Portugal) João Domingues	6–4, 5–7, [7–10]
Win	14–10	Jul 2016	Portugal F9, Idanha-a-Nova	Futures	Hard	(United Kingdom) Jonny O'Mara	(Portugal) Nuno Deus (Spain) Jorge Hernando Ruano	6–2, 6–4
Loss	14–11	Jul 2016	Portugal F10, Castelo Branco	Futures	Hard	(United Kingdom) Jonny O'Mara	(Portugal) Felipe Cunha e Silva (Portugal) Fred Gil	6–1, 4–6, [10–12]
Loss	14–12	Aug 2016	Belarus F2, Minsk	Futures	Hard	(United Kingdom) Jonny O'Mara	(Belarus) Yaraslav Shyla (Belarus) Dzmitry Zhyrmont	5–7, 6–7^{(1–7)}
Win	15–12	Aug 2016	Belarus F3, Minsk	Futures	Hard	(United Kingdom) Jonny O'Mara	(Georgia (country)) George Tsivadze (Turkey) Anıl Yüksel	6–4, 3–6, [13–11]
Win	16–12	Sep 2016	Israel F13, Kiryat Gat	Futures	Hard	(Israel) Dekel Bar	(United States) Nathaniel Lammons (United States) Dane Webb	6–4, 5–7, [10–5]
Win	17–12	Oct 2016	Israel F14, Meitar	Futures	Hard	(Israel) Dekel Bar	(United States) Brandon Anandan (United States) Austin Smith	3–6, 6–3, [10–8]
Win	18–12	Oct 2016	Israel F15, Ramat HaSharon	Futures	Hard	(Israel) Daniel Cukierman	(Israel) Shahar Elbaz (Ukraine) Volodymyr Uzhylovskyi	6–4, 6–3
Win	19–12	Oct 2016	Great Britain F4, Loughborough	Futures	Hard	(United Kingdom) Jonny O'Mara	(United Kingdom) Billy Harris (Poland) Mateusz Terczynski	6–3, 6–2
Win	20–12	Nov 2016	Great Britain F5, Sheffield	Futures	Hard	(United Kingdom) Jonny O'Mara	(United Kingdom) Alastair Gray (United Kingdom) Ewan Moore	6–4, 6–4
Win	21–12	Nov 2016	Great Britain F6, Barnstaple	Futures	Hard	(United Kingdom) Jonny O'Mara	(United States) Hunter Callahan (United States) Nicholas S. Hu	6–4, 7–5
Win	22–12	Dec 2016	Qatar F5, Doha	Futures	Hard	(United Kingdom) Jonny O'Mara	(France) Baptiste Crepatte (France) Quentin Folliot	6–0, 6–0
Win	23–12	Dec 2016	Qatar F6, Doha	Futures	Hard	(United Kingdom) Jonny O'Mara	(Italy) Edoardo Eremin (Italy) Julian Ocleppo	7–6^{(7–0)}, 6–4
Win	24–12	Feb 2017	Great Britain F3, Shrewsbury	Futures	Hard	(United Kingdom) Luke Johnson	(United Kingdom) Jack Molloy (United Kingdom) Marcus Willis	3–6, 6–4, [10–6]
Win	25–12	Apr 2017	France F8, La Grande-Motte	Futures	Hard	(United Kingdom) Jonny O'Mara	(France) Yannick Jankovits (France) Jonathan Kanar	6–4, 6–2
Win	26–12	Jul 2017	Ireland F1, Dublin	Futures	Carpet	(United Kingdom) Jonny O'Mara	(Republic of Ireland) Peter Bothwell (United Kingdom) Lloyd Glasspool	6–1, 6–3
Win	27–12	Sep 2017	İzmir, Turkey	Challenger	Hard	(United Kingdom) Jonny O'Mara	(Ukraine) Denys Molchanov (Ukraine) Sergiy Stakhovsky	Walkover
Loss	27–13	Oct 2017	Brest, France	Challenger	Hard	(India) Divij Sharan	(Netherlands) Sander Arends (Croatia) Antonio Šančić	4–6, 5–7
Win	28–13	Feb 2018	Great Britain F3, Shrewsbury	Futures	Hard	(United Kingdom) Marcus Willis	(Finland) Harri Heliövaara (Denmark) Frederik Nielsen	6–2, 7–5
Win	29–13	Feb 2018	Bergamo, Italy	Challenger	Hard	(United Kingdom) Jonny O'Mara	(Lithuania) Laurynas Grigelis (Italy) Alessandro Motti	5–7, 6–3, [15–13]
Loss	29–14	May 2018	Glasgow, United Kingdom	Challenger	Hard	(United Kingdom) Jonny O'Mara	(Spain) Gerard Granollers (Spain) Guillermo Olaso	1–6, 5–7
Win	30–14	Mar 2019	Pau, France	Challenger	Hard	(Canada) Adil Shamasdin	(Netherlands) Sander Arends (Austria) Tristan-Samuel Weissborn	7–6^{(7–4)}, 5–7, [10–8]
Win	31–14	Mar 2019	Drummondville, Canada	Challenger	Hard	(Canada) Adil Shamasdin	(Australia) Matt Reid (Australia) John-Patrick Smith	7–5, 3–6, [10–5]
Loss	31–15	Aug 2019	M15 Roehampton, Great Britain	World Tennis Tour	Hard	(United Kingdom) Luke Johnson	(United Kingdom) Alastair Gray (United Kingdom) Ewan Moore	3–6, 6–7^{(5–7)}
