= CDMX Open =

2018 tennis tournament in Mexico

Defunct tennis tournament
- Event name: CDMX Open
- Location: Mexico City, Mexico
- Venue: Club Deportivo Chapultepec
- Category: ATP Challenger Tour
- Surface: Clay
- Draw: 32S/32Q/16D
- Prize money: $100,000 + H

The CDMX Open was a professional tennis tournament played on clay courts. It was part of the ATP Challenger Tour. It was held in Mexico City, Mexico, in 2018.

== Past finals ==
=== Singles ===
Year	Champion	Runner-up	Score
2018	(Argentina) Juan Ignacio Londero	(Ecuador) Roberto Quiroz	6–1, 6–3

=== Doubles ===
Year	Champions	Runners-up	Score
2018	(Germany) Yannick Hanfmann (Germany) Kevin Krawietz	(United Kingdom) Luke Bambridge (United Kingdom) Jonny O'Mara	6–2, 7–6^{(7–3)}
