= Murray Trophy – Glasgow =

- 2019 Murray Trophy – Glasgow

ATP Challenger Tour
- Event name: Murray Trophy – Glasgow
- Location: Glasgow, United Kingdom
- Venue: Scotstoun Leisure Centre
- Category: ATP Challenger Tour
- Surface: Hard (indoor)
- Draw: 48S/4Q/16D
- Website: Official website

The Murray Trophy – Glasgow is a professional tennis tournament played on indoor hard courts. It was part of the ATP Challenger Tour and held annually in Glasgow, United Kingdom since 2018. The event was cancelled in 2020. In 2024, it made a return on the ATP Tour calendar as the Lexus Glasgow Challenger.

== Past finals ==
=== Singles ===
Year	Champion	Runner-up	Score
2020	Cancelled due to the COVID-19 pandemic		
2019	(Finland) Emil Ruusuvuori	(France) Alexandre Müller	6–3, 6–1
2018	(Slovakia) Lukáš Lacko	(Italy) Luca Vanni	4–6, 7–6^{(7–3)}, 6–4

=== Doubles ===
Year	Champions	Runners-up	Score
2020	Cancelled due to the COVID-19 pandemic		
2019	(Belgium) Ruben Bemelmans (Germany) Daniel Masur	(United Kingdom) Jamie Murray (Australia) John-Patrick Smith	4–6, 6–3, [10–8]
2018	(Spain) Gerard Granollers (Spain) Guillermo Olaso	(United Kingdom) Scott Clayton (United Kingdom) Jonny O'Mara	6–1, 7–5
