= 2014 Wimbledon Championships – Men's singles qualifying =

Tennis tournament

Men's singles qualifying
- 2014 Wimbledon Championships

Events
Singles	men	women		boys	girls
Doubles	men	women	mixed	boys	girls
WC Singles	men	women	quad
WC Doubles	men	women	quad
Legends	men	women	seniors

Qualification
Singles	men	women
Doubles	men	women
- Wimbledon Championships

Players and pairs who neither have high enough rankings nor receive wild cards may participate in a qualifying tournament held one week before the annual Wimbledon Tennis Championships.

== Seeds ==
1. (Brazil) Thomaz Bellucci (first round)
2. (Japan) Go Soeda (first round)
3. (United States) Tim Smyczek (qualifying competition)
4. (Luxembourg) Gilles Müller (qualified)
5. (Bosnia and Herzegovina) Damir Džumhur (first round)
6. (Germany) Michael Berrer (first round)
7. (Tunisia) Malek Jaziri (qualifying competition, lucky loser)
8. (Germany) Peter Gojowczyk (first round)
9. (United States) Denis Kudla (qualified)
10. (Canada) Frank Dancevic (qualifying competition, lucky loser)
11. (Canada) Peter Polansky (second round)
12. (Germany) Andreas Beck (second round)
13. (Italy) Simone Bolelli (qualifying competition, lucky loser)
14. (Japan) Tatsuma Ito (qualified)
15. (Serbia) Filip Krajinović (second round)
16. (Germany) Daniel Brands (qualifying competition)
17. (Slovakia) Norbert Gombos (first round)
18. (Slovenia) Aljaž Bedene (qualifying competition, lucky loser)
19. (France) Pierre-Hugues Herbert (qualified)
20. (Australia) Sam Groth (qualified)
21. (Lithuania) Ričardas Berankis (qualifying competition)
22. (United States) Ryan Harrison (qualified)
23. (Chinese Taipei) Jimmy Wang (qualified)
24. (Japan) Yuichi Sugita (qualified)
25. (Slovakia) Andrej Martin (first round)
26. (United States) Alex Kuznetsov (qualified)
27. (Turkey) Marsel İlhan (qualified)
28. (Brazil) João Souza (first round)
29. (France) Marc Gicquel (qualifying competition)
30. (Uzbekistan) Farrukh Dustov (second round)
31. (United States) Rajeev Ram (qualifying competition)
32. (Argentina) Guido Andreozzi (first round)

== Qualifiers ==
1. (Australia) Luke Saville
2. (Australia) James Duckworth
3. (United States) Alex Kuznetsov
4. (Luxembourg) Gilles Müller
5. (Croatia) Ante Pavić
6. (Russia) Konstantin Kravchuk
7. (Turkey) Marsel İlhan
8. (Japan) Yūichi Sugita
9. (United States) Denis Kudla
10. (Chinese Taipei) Jimmy Wang
11. (France) Pierre-Hugues Herbert
12. (Germany) Tim Pütz
13. (Australia) Sam Groth
14. (Japan) Tatsuma Ito
15. (Czech Republic) Jan Hernych
16. (United States) Ryan Harrison

== Lucky losers ==
1. (Tunisia) Malek Jaziri
2. (Canada) Frank Dancevic
3. (Italy) Simone Bolelli
4. (Slovenia) Aljaž Bedene

== Qualifying draw ==
=== First qualifier ===
First round
1	(Brazil) Thomaz Bellucci	4	7^{7}	1
(Australia) Luke Saville	6	6^{4}	6
(United States) Rhyne Williams	3	6	6
WC	(United Kingdom) Joshua Milton	6	3	2
(Argentina) Andrea Collarini	6^{5}	5
Alt	(Greece) Theodoros Angelinos	7^{7}	7
(Switzerland) Yann Marti	6	7^{7}
32	(Argentina) Guido Andreozzi	1	6^{5}

Second round
(Australia) Luke Saville	7^{7}	4	6
(United States) Rhyne Williams	6^{4}	6	1
Alt	(Greece) Theodoros Angelinos	4	6	2
(Switzerland) Yann Marti	6	2	6

Qualifying competition
(Australia) Luke Saville	2	6	5	7^{9}	8
(Switzerland) Yann Marti	6	3	7	6^{7}	6

=== Second qualifier ===
First round
2	(Japan) Go Soeda	4	6^{10}
(Austria) Martin Fischer	6	7^{12}
(Germany) Matthias Bachinger	6	7^{7}
(United States) Austin Krajicek	4	6^{1}
(Argentina) Juan Ignacio Londero	6^{9}	2
(Australia) James Duckworth	7^{11}	6
(Australia) John-Patrick Smith	6^{7}	6	3
30	(Uzbekistan) Farrukh Dustov	7^{9}	3	6

Second round
(Austria) Martin Fischer	2	6	10
(Germany) Matthias Bachinger	6	2	8
(Australia) James Duckworth	4	7^{7}	8
30	(Uzbekistan) Farrukh Dustov	6	6^{5}	6

Qualifying competition
(Austria) Martin Fischer	4	6^{5}	4
(Australia) James Duckworth	6	7^{7}	6

=== Third qualifier ===
First round
3	(United States) Tim Smyczek	6	6
(Belgium) Niels Desein	3	2
(Italy) Flavio Cipolla	6	6
(Spain) Gerard Granollers	1	1
(Brazil) Rogério Dutra Silva	6	6
(Croatia) Kristijan Mesaroš	2	3
(Switzerland) Henri Laaksonen	4	6^{2}
26	(United States) Alex Kuznetsov	6	7^{7}

Second round
3	(United States) Tim Smyczek	6	6
(Italy) Flavio Cipolla	4	3
(Brazil) Rogério Dutra Silva	6^{5}	6^{4}
26	(United States) Alex Kuznetsov	7^{7}	7^{7}

Qualifying competition
3	(United States) Tim Smyczek	6	3	3	3
26	(United States) Alex Kuznetsov	4	6	6	6

=== Fourth qualifier ===
First round
4	(Luxembourg) Gilles Müller	7^{7}	6
(Ecuador) Giovanni Lapentti	6^{5}	4
(France) Grégoire Burquier	6	6
(France) Lucas Pouille	4	3
(Italy) Lorenzo Giustino	2	5
(Spain) Adrián Menéndez Maceiras	6	7
(Belarus) Uladzimir Ignatik	6	6
28	(Brazil) João Souza	2	2

Second round
4	(Luxembourg) Gilles Müller	6	6
(France) Grégoire Burquier	2	4
(Spain) Adrián Menéndez Maceiras	1	6	6
(Belarus) Uladzimir Ignatik	6	3	4

Qualifying competition
4	(Luxembourg) Gilles Müller	6	6	7^{7}
(Spain) Adrián Menéndez Maceiras	3	4	6^{3}

=== Fifth qualifier ===
First round
5	(Bosnia and Herzegovina) Damir Džumhur	6	3	0
(Croatia) Ante Pavić	3	6	6
WC	(United Kingdom) Joshua Ward-Hibbert	3	4
(United States) Wayne Odesnik	6	6
(Croatia) Nikola Mektić	1	0
(Japan) Hiroki Moriya	6	6
WC	(United Kingdom) David Rice	7^{7}	1	2
29	(France) Marc Gicquel	6^{5}	6	6

Second round
(Croatia) Ante Pavić	6	6
(United States) Wayne Odesnik	3	0
(Japan) Hiroki Moriya	3	1
29	(France) Marc Gicquel	6	6

Qualifying competition
(Croatia) Ante Pavić	4	6	7^{7}	6
29	(France) Marc Gicquel	6	3	6^{5}	4

=== Sixth qualifier ===
First round
6	(Germany) Michael Berrer	5	6	3
(Russia) Konstantin Kravchuk	7	3	6
(Ukraine) Sergei Bubka	6	4	0
(United States) Bobby Reynolds	3	6	6
(Russia) Aslan Karatsev	3	6^{5}
(Argentina) Agustín Velotti	6	7^{7}
(Australia) Alex Bolt	7	6
17	(Slovakia) Norbert Gombos	5	4

Second round
(Russia) Konstantin Kravchuk	6	7^{7}
(United States) Bobby Reynolds	1	6^{3}
(Argentina) Agustín Velotti	3	3
(Australia) Alex Bolt	6	6

Qualifying competition
(Russia) Konstantin Kravchuk	3	7^{7}	6	6
(Australia) Alex Bolt	6	6^{5}	4	4

=== Seventh qualifier ===
First round
7	(Tunisia) Malek Jaziri	2	7	6
(Republic of Ireland) Louk Sorensen	6	5	2
(France) Vincent Millot	6	6
(Portugal) Rui Machado	4	3
(Spain) Óscar Hernández	4	3
(Croatia) Toni Androić	6	6
(France) Albano Olivetti	3	3
27	(Turkey) Marsel İlhan	6	6

Second round
7	(Tunisia) Malek Jaziri	4	6	6
(France) Vincent Millot	6	3	0
(Croatia) Toni Androić	3	4
27	(Turkey) Marsel İlhan	6	6

Qualifying competition
7	(Tunisia) Malek Jaziri	4	2	6	3
27	(Turkey) Marsel İlhan	6	6	1	6

=== Eighth qualifier ===
First round
8	(Germany) Peter Gojowczyk	4	1
WC	(United Kingdom) Oliver Golding	6	6
(Switzerland) Marco Chiudinelli	3
(France) Éric Prodon	2^{r}
(Belgium) Germain Gigounon	7	7^{10}
(Australia) Matt Reid	5	6^{8}
(Belgium) Yannick Mertens	5	3
24	(Japan) Yūichi Sugita	7	6

Second round
WC	(United Kingdom) Oliver Golding	6	4	4
(Switzerland) Marco Chiudinelli	3	6	6
(Belgium) Germain Gigounon	6	3	3
24	(Japan) Yūichi Sugita	3	6	6

Qualifying competition
(Switzerland) Marco Chiudinelli	4	2	5
24	(Japan) Yūichi Sugita	6	6	7

=== Ninth qualifier ===
First round
9	(United States) Denis Kudla	6	6
(Georgia (country)) Nikoloz Basilashvili	3	0
(Belgium) Maxime Authom	3	0^{r}
WC	(United Kingdom) Brydan Klein	6	1
(Argentina) Martín Alund	6	7
(Moldova) Radu Albot	2	5
(Republic of Ireland) James McGee	4	4
18	(Slovenia) Aljaž Bedene	6	6

Second round
9	(United States) Denis Kudla	3	6	6
WC	(United Kingdom) Brydan Klein	6	2	3
(Argentina) Martín Alund	2	4
18	(Slovenia) Aljaž Bedene	6	6

Qualifying competition
9	(United States) Denis Kudla	6	5	6	6
18	(Slovenia) Aljaž Bedene	3	7	1	4

=== Tenth qualifier ===
First round
10	(Canada) Frank Dancevic	7	4	6
(Romania) Victor Crivoi	5	6	3
(Australia) Benjamin Mitchell	3	3
(Romania) Marius Copil	6	6
(Canada) Steven Diez	6	3	2
(China) Zhang Ze	4	6	6
(Italy) Thomas Fabbiano	6	3	1
23	(Chinese Taipei) Jimmy Wang	2	6	6

Second round
10	(Canada) Frank Dancevic	6^{4}	7^{7}	6
(Romania) Marius Copil	7^{7}	6^{4}	2
(China) Zhang Ze	6	3	0
23	(Chinese Taipei) Jimmy Wang	4	6	6

Qualifying competition
10	(Canada) Frank Dancevic	6	2	1	4
23	(Chinese Taipei) Jimmy Wang	2	6	6	6

=== Eleventh qualifier ===
First round
11	(Canada) Peter Polansky	3	6	6
(France) Axel Michon	6	4	0
(Slovakia) Miloslav Mečíř Jr.	7	6
(Spain) Jordi Samper Montaña	5	4
(United States) Daniel Kosakowski	6	6
WC	(United Kingdom) Marcus Willis	3	3
(Croatia) Borna Ćorić	6^{5}	1
19	(France) Pierre-Hugues Herbert	7^{7}	6

Second round
11	(Canada) Peter Polansky	3	2
(Slovakia) Miloslav Mečíř Jr.	6	6
(United States) Daniel Kosakowski	1	3
19	(France) Pierre-Hugues Herbert	6	6

Qualifying competition
(Slovakia) Miloslav Mečíř Jr.	6	3	5	4
19	(France) Pierre-Hugues Herbert	4	6	7	6

=== Twelfth qualifier ===
First round
12	(Germany) Andreas Beck	6	7^{7}
(United States) Chase Buchanan	4	6^{4}
(Spain) Íñigo Cervantes	6	6^{2}	4
(Hungary) Márton Fucsovics	4	7^{7}	6
(Belgium) Ruben Bemelmans	6	0
(Israel) Amir Weintraub	1	0^{r}
(Germany) Tim Pütz	6	6
25	(Slovakia) Andrej Martin	4	1

Second round
12	(Germany) Andreas Beck	2	6^{4}
(Hungary) Márton Fucsovics	6	7^{7}
(Belgium) Ruben Bemelmans	4	2
(Germany) Tim Pütz	6	6

Qualifying competition
(Hungary) Márton Fucsovics	6^{3}	6^{16}	1
(Germany) Tim Pütz	7^{7}	7^{18}	6

=== Thirteenth qualifier ===
First round
13	(Italy) Simone Bolelli	6	6
(France) Maxime Teixeira	3	2
(Lithuania) Laurynas Grigelis	6	6
(Spain) Enrique López Pérez	1	2
(Spain) José Checa Calvo	5^{r}
(France) Jonathan Eysseric	5
WC	(United Kingdom) Edward Corrie	3	6^{2}
20	(Australia) Sam Groth	6	7^{7}

Second round
13	(Italy) Simone Bolelli	6	6
(Lithuania) Laurynas Grigelis	1	3
(France) Jonathan Eysseric	4	7^{7}	3
20	(Australia) Sam Groth	6	6^{2}	6

Qualifying competition
13	(Italy) Simone Bolelli	2	6	6^{4}	4
20	(Australia) Sam Groth	6	4	7^{7}	6

=== Fourteenth qualifier ===
First round
14	(Japan) Tatsuma Ito	6^{2}	6	6
(Chile) Hans Podlipnik Castillo	7^{7}	4	3
(Brazil) André Ghem	6	6
(Ecuador) Emilio Gómez	4	4
(Italy) Andrea Arnaboldi	6	4	6
(Italy) Matteo Viola	3	6	0
WC	(United Kingdom) Alexander Ward	3	4
21	(Lithuania) Ričardas Berankis	6	6

Second round
14	(Japan) Tatsuma Ito	7	6
(Brazil) André Ghem	5	4
(Italy) Andrea Arnaboldi	4	3
21	(Lithuania) Ričardas Berankis	6	6

Qualifying competition
14	(Japan) Tatsuma Ito	5	4	6	7	6
21	(Lithuania) Ričardas Berankis	7	6	3	5	0

=== Fifteenth qualifier ===
First round
15	(Serbia) Filip Krajinović	6	6
(Croatia) Mate Delić	4	2
(Czech Republic) Jan Mertl	2^{r}
(Czech Republic) Jan Hernych	4
(Czech Republic) Jaroslav Pospíšil	4	6	4
(Portugal) Gastão Elias	6	2	6
(Serbia) Ilija Bozoljac	4	4
31	(United States) Rajeev Ram	6	6

Second round
15	(Serbia) Filip Krajinović	3	4
(Czech Republic) Jan Hernych	6	6
(Portugal) Gastão Elias	4	6^{4}
31	(United States) Rajeev Ram	6	7^{7}

Qualifying competition
(Czech Republic) Jan Hernych	6	6	6^{2}	6
31	(United States) Rajeev Ram	3	4	7^{7}	2

=== Sixteenth qualifier ===
First round
16	(Germany) Daniel Brands	6	4	6
(Slovenia) Grega Žemlja	4	6	0
(Ukraine) Illya Marchenko	5	3
WC	(Belgium) Steve Darcis	7	6
(France) David Guez	5	6	7
(Japan) Yasutaka Uchiyama	7	4	9
(Japan) Taro Daniel	6	3	4
22	(United States) Ryan Harrison	2	6	6

Second round
16	(Germany) Daniel Brands	3	7	6
WC	(Belgium) Steve Darcis	6	5	2
(Japan) Yasutaka Uchiyama	1	3
22	(United States) Ryan Harrison	6	6

Qualifying competition
16	(Germany) Daniel Brands	6^{3}	2	3
22	(United States) Ryan Harrison	7^{7}	6	6
