= John Ayton =

British businessman

- Born: 1962 or 1963 (age 62–63)
- Education: Oxford University
- Occupation: Businessman
- Spouse: Annoushka Ducas
- Children: 4

John Ayton MBE (born 1962/1963), is a British businessman and investor in the luxury goods industry, and the co-founder of Links of London and Annoushka, an English jewellery brand founded in 2009.

== Early life ==
Ayton was educated at Oundle School and graduated in Modern History from Oxford University in 1983.

== Career ==
After university, Ayton worked in corporate law in London and Hong Kong.

Leaving the legal profession in 1995, he was on the advisory board of Halston Borghese Inc, a US-based cosmetics company, responsible for restructuring their Japanese and German operations.

In 1990, together with his wife, jewellery designer Annoushka Ducas, Ayton co-founded Links of London, a jewellery brand with sales of over £50m. In July 2006, they sold the company to Folli Follie SA. In October 2007, Ayton stepped down from the company.

In July 2009, Ayton and Ducas launched English jewellery brand Annoushka Jewellery.

=== Investment and mentoring ===
Ayton has invested at the earliest stage in emerging luxury brands including Bremont Watch Company, Orlebar Brown, Mr Hare, Boticca.com and Grind & Co.

He also acts as a mentor and advisor to the founders, and is chairman at both Bremont and Mr Hare.

Ayton was the founder of Walpole Brands of Tomorrow and its chair and a director until 2014. Since 2007, he has been mentoring and supporting British emerging talent within the luxury goods industry.

== Other ==
Ayton and wife Ducas were ambassadors for Team 2012, the campaign to support British athletes in their quest for medal success in the London Olympics. The campaign raised over £18 million.

== Honours ==
In the 2012 New Years Honours List, Ayton was awarded an MBE for his services to the UK jewellery industry.

== Personal life ==
Ayton and Ducas live in a Georgian cottage in Pimlico, London, since 2007, having previously lived in Notting Hill. They also have a seaside house in Bosham, West Sussex. They have four children.
