= Annoushka Ducas =

British jewellery designer

- Occupation: Jewelry designer

Annoushka Ducas is a jewellery designer, creative director and entrepreneur who founded British jewellery companies Links of London and Annoushka.

== Biography ==
After studying at the Sorbonne in Paris in the 1980s, Annoushka embarked on the first of many extensive world travels, stopping to spend time in Hong Kong, where she first began to design jewellery.

In 1990, together with her husband, luxury entrepreneur John Ayton, Ducas co-founded Links of London – a global luxury jewellery brand with sales of over £50m. In July 2006, they sold the company to Folli Follie SA and in October 2007, Ducas left the company.

In July 2009, Ducas launched the brand Annoushka Jewellery.

== Awards ==
In 2013, Ducas was awarded an MBE for her contribution to the jewellery industry. The accolade was announced in the 2012 New Years Honours List.

Other awards that Ducas has received include Jewellery Designer of the Year, Gift Designer of the Year and Brand of the Year. She was short-listed for the Veuve Clicquot businesswoman of the year and was recognised in the Professional Jeweller Hot 100 in both 2010 and 2011 for her work on her own business.

== Celebrities ==
Fans of Annoushka, the brand, include Gwyneth Paltrow, Kate Hudson, Danni Minogue, Jennifer Lopez, Rihanna and Emma Watson.

== Mentoring ==
Ducas oversees an annual design project with students at Central Saint Martins College of Art and Design, and has recently established her Art at Annoushka initiative, which sees her collaborate with "creative forces at the forefront of the contemporary art scene."
