= Links of London =

British jewellery brand

- Type: Private
- Genre: Concept Store
- Founded: 1990; 36 years ago
- Founder: John Ayton & Annoushka Ducas
- Headquarters: Mayfair, London, England
- Key people: John Ayton; Annoushka Ducas
- Products: Fashion; Jewellery; Accessories
- Parent: Folli Follie
- Website: http://www.linksoflondon.com/us-en/

Links of London was a British brand owned by Greek jewellery company Folli Follie, with headquarters in London, England. It was founded in 1990 by John Ayton and Annoushka Ducas. It sold through outlets in Europe, the US, Asia and online. The business struggled and needed a buyer which the business couldn't obtain so it disappeared from the high streets and is no longer trading. The last known store to close was Hong Kong and after June 2020, the brand ceased to exist.

== History ==
Links of London started in 1990 when a London restaurant owner commissioned fish-shaped cufflinks. Throughout the next 15 years, Links of London expanded, with retail outlets in the United Kingdom, the United States, Canada, Japan and Hong Kong. In July 2006, the company was sold to Folli Follie SA. In October 2007, Ducas left the company. In July 2009, Ducas launched the brand Annoushka Jewellery.

The company's revenue was £85m in 2009. In 2014, Links of London was named the official jewellery sponsor of the Wimbledon tennis tournament.

Bankruptcy: In March 2019, the brand was experiencing a major financial struggle and 500 jobs were in jeopardy. The company then appointed a new creative director with the hopes of turning things around. Unfortunately, things did not go to plan as the parent company of Links of London, Folli Follie, was fined €20 million for overstating its revenue by €1 billion. This called for Links of London to shut down all US/Canadian and 16 UK stores. In January 2020, Retail Insider reported the once-popular jeweller Links of London was planning on closing all five of its Canadian stores in the coming year. In October 2019, the retailer started liquidating some of its stores in the United States and the United Kingdom where it had approximately 28 stores.

== Notable designs ==
During the 2014 Wimbledon women's singles tournament, champion Petra Kvitová wore Links of London jewellery at the trophy presentation. The two-time Czech singles champion wore Essentials Hope earrings, the Effervescence Bubble bracelet and a 20/20 Sterling necklace.

Catherine Middleton, wore Links of London 'Hope Topaz' earrings in her official engagement photos.
