= 2014 Wimbledon Championships =

- Date: 23 June – 6 July
- Edition: 128th
- Category: Grand Slam (ITF)
- Draw: 128S / 64D / 48XD
- Prize money: £25,000,000
- Surface: Grass
- Location: Church Road; SW19, Wimbledon, London, United Kingdom
- Venue: All England Lawn Tennis and Croquet Club
- Attendance: 491,084

Champions

Men's singles
- (Serbia) Novak Djokovic

Women's singles
- (Czech Republic) Petra Kvitová

Men's doubles
- (Canada) Vasek Pospisil / (United States) Jack Sock

Women's doubles
- (Italy) Sara Errani / (Italy) Roberta Vinci

Mixed doubles
- (Serbia) Nenad Zimonjić / (Australia) Samantha Stosur

Wheelchair men's doubles
- (France) Stéphane Houdet / (Japan) Shingo Kunieda

Wheelchair women's doubles
- (Japan) Yui Kamiji / (United Kingdom) Jordanne Whiley

Boys' singles
- (United States) Noah Rubin

Girls' singles
- (Latvia) Jeļena Ostapenko

Boys' doubles
- (Brazil) Orlando Luz / (Brazil) Marcelo Zormann

Girls' doubles
- (Indonesia) Tami Grende / (China) Ye Qiuyu

Gentlemen's invitation doubles
- (Sweden) Thomas Enqvist / (Australia) Mark Philippoussis

Ladies' invitation doubles
- (Czech Republic) Jana Novotná / (Austria) Barbara Schett

Senior gentlemen's invitation doubles
- (France) Guy Forget / (France) Cédric Pioline
- Wimbledon Championships

The 2014 Wimbledon Championships was a tennis tournament played on grass courts at the All England Lawn Tennis and Croquet Club in Wimbledon, London in the United Kingdom. It was the 128th edition of the Wimbledon Championships and were held from 23 June to 6 July 2014. It was the third Grand Slam tennis event of the year and was part of the ATP World Tour, the WTA Tour, the ITF Junior Tour and the NEC Tour. The championships were organised by the All England Lawn Tennis and Croquet Club and the International Tennis Federation.

Andy Murray was the defending champion in the men's singles, but lost to Grigor Dimitrov in the quarterfinals. Marion Bartoli was the reigning champion in the women's singles; however, her retirement from the sport following her victory meant that she did not return to defend her title. As a result, the opening Ladies' Singles match on Centre Court on the second day of the tournament – which is traditionally played by the defending champion – was played by Bartoli's opponent in the 2013 final, runner-up Sabine Lisicki.

The men and women's singles titles were won by Novak Djokovic and Petra Kvitová respectively.

== Tournament ==
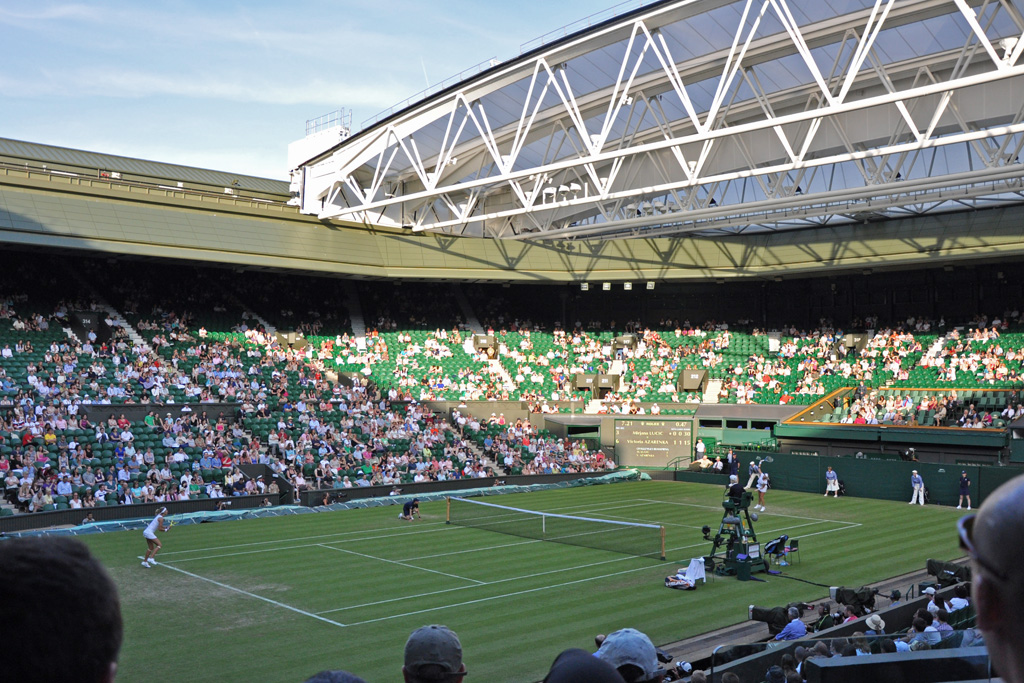
Centre Court where the Finals of Wimbledon take place.

The 2014 Wimbledon Championships was the 128th edition of the tournament and was held at All England Lawn Tennis and Croquet Club in London.

The tournament was an event run by the International Tennis Federation (ITF) and was part of the 2014 ATP World Tour and the 2014 WTA Tour calendars under the Grand Slam category. The tournament consisted of both men's and women's singles and doubles draws as well as a mixed doubles event. There were singles and doubles events for both boys and girls (players under 18), which was part of the Grade A category of tournaments, and doubles events for men's and women's wheelchair tennis players as part of the NEC tour under the Grand Slam category. The tournament was played on grass courts and takes place over a series of 19 courts, including the four main showcourts, Centre Court, No. 1 Court, No. 2 Court and No. 3 Court.

== Point and prize money distribution ==
=== Point distribution ===
Below is a series of tables for each of the competitions showing the ranking points on offer for each event.

==== Seniors points ====
Event	W	F	SF	QF	Round of 16	Round of 32	Round of 64	Round of 128	Q	Q3	Q2	Q1
Gentlemen's singles	2000	1200	720	360	180	90	45	10	25	16	8	0
Gentlemen's doubles	2000	1200	720	360	180	90	0	—N/a	25	—N/a	0	0
Ladies' singles	2000	1300	780	430	240	130	70	10	40	30	20	2
Ladies' doubles	2000	1300	780	430	240	130	5	—N/a	48	—N/a	0	0

==== Wheelchair points ====
Event	W	F	3rd	4th
Doubles	800	500	375	100

==== Junior points ====
Event	W	F	SF	QF	Round of 16	Round of 32	Q	Q3
Boys' singles	375	270	180	120	75	30	25	20
Girls' singles	375	270	180	120	75	30	25	20
Boys' doubles	270	180	120	75	45	—N/a	—N/a	—N/a
Girls' doubles	270	180	120	75	45	—N/a	—N/a	—N/a

=== Prize money ===
The Wimbledon total prize money for 2014 was raised to £25,000,000, an increase of 10.8% compared to the tournament's previous edition. The winners of the men's and women's singles titles will earn £1.76m, up £160,000 from the previous year. The figures for doubles events are per pair.

Event	W	F	SF	QF	Round of 16	Round of 32	Round of 64	Round of 128	Q3	Q2	Q1
Singles	£1,760,000	£880,000	£440,000	£226,000	£117,000	£71,000	£43,000	£27,000	£13,500	£6,750	£3,375
Doubles*	£325,000	£163,000	£81,500	£41,000	£21,500	£13,000	£8,500	—N/a	—N/a	—N/a	—N/a
Mixed doubles*	£96,000	£48,000	£24,000	£11,500	£5,600	£2,800	£1,400	—N/a	—N/a	—N/a	—N/a
Wheelchair doubles*	£12,000	£6,000	£4,000	£3,000	—N/a	—N/a	—N/a	—N/a	—N/a	—N/a	—N/a
Invitation doubles*	£21,000	£18,000	£15,000	£14,000	£13,000	—N/a	—N/a	—N/a	—N/a	—N/a	—N/a

_{* per team}

== Singles players ==
2014 Wimbledon Championships – Men's singles

Champion		Runner-up	
(Serbia) Novak Djokovic [1]		(Switzerland) Roger Federer [4]	
Semifinals out
(Bulgaria) Grigor Dimitrov [13]		(Canada) Milos Raonic [8]	
Quarterfinals out
(Croatia) Marin Čilić [26]	(United Kingdom) Andy Murray [3]	(Switzerland) Stan Wawrinka [5]	(Australia) Nick Kyrgios (WC)
4th round out
(France) Jo-Wilfried Tsonga [14]	(France) Jérémy Chardy	(South Africa) Kevin Anderson [20]	(Argentina) Leonardo Mayer
(Spain) Feliciano López [19]	(Spain) Tommy Robredo [23]	(Japan) Kei Nishikori [10]	(Spain) Rafael Nadal [2]
3rd round out
(France) Gilles Simon	(Chinese Taipei) Jimmy Wang (Q)	(Ukraine) Sergiy Stakhovsky	(Czech Republic) Tomáš Berdych [6]
(Spain) Roberto Bautista Agut [27]	(Italy) Fabio Fognini [16]	(Ukraine) Alexandr Dolgopolov [21]	(Russia) Andrey Kuznetsov
(Uzbekistan) Denis Istomin	(United States) John Isner [9]	(Poland) Jerzy Janowicz [15]	(Colombia) Santiago Giraldo
(Poland) Łukasz Kubot	(Italy) Simone Bolelli (LL)	(Czech Republic) Jiří Veselý (WC)	(Kazakhstan) Mikhail Kukushkin
2nd round out
(Czech Republic) Radek Štěpánek	(Netherlands) Robin Haase	(Russia) Mikhail Youzhny [17]	(United States) Sam Querrey
(Latvia) Ernests Gulbis [12]	(Australia) Marinko Matosevic	(Austria) Andreas Haider-Maurer	(Australia) Bernard Tomic
(Slovenia) Blaž Rola	(Czech Republic) Jan Hernych (Q)	(France) Édouard Roger-Vasselin	(Germany) Tim Pütz (Q)
(Australia) Luke Saville (Q)	(Germany) Benjamin Becker	(Cyprus) Marcos Baghdatis (WC)	(Spain) David Ferrer [7]
(Chinese Taipei) Lu Yen-hsun	(Germany) Julian Reister	(Croatia) Ante Pavić (Q)	(Finland) Jarkko Nieminen
(Australia) Lleyton Hewitt	(France) Adrian Mannarino	(Spain) Marcel Granollers [30]	(Luxembourg) Gilles Müller (Q)
(United States) Jack Sock	(Serbia) Dušan Lajović	(Germany) Philipp Kohlschreiber [22]	(United States) Denis Kudla (Q)
(France) Richard Gasquet [13]	(France) Gaël Monfils [24]	(Canada) Frank Dancevic (LL)	(Czech Republic) Lukáš Rosol
1st round out
(Kazakhstan) Andrey Golubev	(Uruguay) Pablo Cuevas (PR)	(Russia) Konstantin Kravchuk (Q)	(Canada) Vasek Pospisil [31]
(United Kingdom) James Ward (WC)	(Colombia) Alejandro González	(United States) Bradley Klahn	(Austria) Jürgen Melzer
(Estonia) Jürgen Zopp (PR)	(Argentina) Carlos Berlocq	(United Kingdom) Daniel Cox (WC)	(Spain) Fernando Verdasco [18]
(France) Paul-Henri Mathieu	(United Kingdom) Kyle Edmund (WC)	(Russia) Evgeny Donskoy	(Romania) Victor Hănescu
(Belgium) David Goffin	(Spain) Pablo Andújar	(Germany) Tobias Kamke	(United States) Steve Johnson
(Slovenia) Aljaž Bedene (LL)	(Italy) Filippo Volandri	(Russia) Teymuraz Gabashvili	(United States) Alex Kuznetsov (Q)
(United States) Ryan Harrison (Q)	(Austria) Dominic Thiem	(United States) Donald Young	(Australia) Sam Groth (Q)
(Italy) Andreas Seppi [25]	(Germany) Dustin Brown	(United Kingdom) Dan Evans (WC)	(Spain) Pablo Carreño Busta
(Portugal) João Sousa	(Kazakhstan) Aleksandr Nedovyesov	(United States) Michael Russell	(Russia) Dmitry Tursunov [32]
(Japan) Yūichi Sugita (Q)	(Colombia) Alejandro Falla	(Argentina) Federico Delbonis	(United Kingdom) Daniel Smethurst (WC)
(India) Somdev Devvarman	(Poland) Michał Przysiężny	(Spain) Pere Riba	(Slovakia) Lukáš Lacko
(France) Nicolas Mahut	(Spain) Daniel Gimeno Traver	(France) Julien Benneteau	(Italy) Paolo Lorenzi
(Australia) Matthew Ebden	(France) Pierre-Hugues Herbert (Q)	(Germany) Jan-Lennard Struff	(Spain) Guillermo García López [28]
(Netherlands) Igor Sijsling	(Japan) Tatsuma Ito (Q)	(Turkey) Marsel İlhan (Q)	(France) Kenny de Schepper
(Australia) James Duckworth (Q)	(France) Stéphane Robert	(Dominican Republic) Víctor Estrella Burgos	(Tunisia) Malek Jaziri (LL)
(Croatia) Ivo Karlović [29]	(Israel) Dudi Sela	(France) Benoît Paire	(Slovakia) Martin Kližan

2014 Wimbledon Championships – Women's singles

Champion		Runner-up	
(Czech Republic) Petra Kvitová [6]		(Canada) Eugenie Bouchard [13]	
Semifinals out
(Romania) Simona Halep [3]		(Czech Republic) Lucie Šafářová [23]	
Quarterfinals out
(Germany) Angelique Kerber [9]	(Germany) Sabine Lisicki [19]	(Russia) Ekaterina Makarova [22]	(Czech Republic) Barbora Záhlavová-Strýcová
4th round out
(France) Alizé Cornet [25]	(Russia) Maria Sharapova [5]	(Kazakhstan) Zarina Diyas	(Kazakhstan) Yaroslava Shvedova
(Czech Republic) Tereza Smitková (Q)	(Poland) Agnieszka Radwańska [4]	(China) Peng Shuai	(Denmark) Caroline Wozniacki [16]
3rd round out
(United States) Serena Williams [1]	(Germany) Andrea Petkovic [20]	(Belgium) Kirsten Flipkens [24]	(United States) Alison Riske
(Switzerland) Belinda Bencic	(Russia) Vera Zvonareva (WC)	(Serbia) Ana Ivanovic [11]	(United States) Madison Keys
(Serbia) Bojana Jovanovski	(Slovakia) Dominika Cibulková [10]	(France) Caroline Garcia	(Portugal) Michelle Larcher de Brito (Q)
(United States) Venus Williams [30]	(United States) Lauren Davis	(Croatia) Ana Konjuh (Q)	(China) Li Na [2]
2nd round out
(South Africa) Chanelle Scheepers	(Czech Republic) Petra Cetkovská	(Romania) Irina-Camelia Begu	(Spain) Sílvia Soler Espinosa (WC)
(United Kingdom) Heather Watson	(Spain) Lourdes Domínguez Lino	(Italy) Camila Giorgi	(Switzerland) Timea Bacsinszky (Q)
(Ukraine) Lesia Tsurenko (Q)	(United States) Victoria Duval (Q)	(Croatia) Donna Vekić	(Spain) Carla Suárez Navarro [15]
(China) Zheng Jie	(Czech Republic) Karolína Plíšková	(Czech Republic) Klára Koukalová [31]	(Estonia) Kaia Kanepi
(Belarus) Victoria Azarenka [8]	(United States) CoCo Vandeweghe	(Slovenia) Polona Hercog	(Belgium) Alison Van Uytvanck
(United States) Varvara Lepchenko	(Japan) Misaki Doi	(Australia) Jarmila Gajdošová (WC)	(Australia) Casey Dellacqua
(Germany) Mona Barthel	(Japan) Kurumi Nara	(Russia) Maria Kirilenko	(Italy) Flavia Pennetta [12]
(United Kingdom) Naomi Broady (WC)	(Belgium) Yanina Wickmayer	(Russia) Elena Vesnina [32]	(Austria) Yvonne Meusburger
1st round out
(United States) Anna Tatishvili	(United States) Christina McHale	(Serbia) Jovana Jakšić	(Slovakia) Anna Schmiedlová
(Poland) Katarzyna Piter	(France) Virginie Razzano	(Belarus) Olga Govortsova	(Slovakia) Daniela Hantuchová
(Poland) Urszula Radwańska	(Croatia) Ajla Tomljanović	(Croatia) Petra Martić	(Austria) Tamira Paszek (Q)
(Russia) Anastasia Pavlyuchenkova [26]	(Romania) Alexandra Cadanțu	(Canada) Sharon Fichman	(United Kingdom) Samantha Murray (WC)
(Brazil) Teliana Pereira	(Germany) Dinah Pfizenmaier	(Slovakia) Magdaléna Rybáriková	(Romania) Sorana Cîrstea [29]
(Italy) Roberta Vinci [21]	(United Kingdom) Tara Moore (WC)	(France) Kristina Mladenovic	(China) Zhang Shuai
(Italy) Francesca Schiavone	(Germany) Annika Beck	(Italy) Karin Knapp	(Israel) Julia Glushko
(United States) Taylor Townsend (WC)	(Puerto Rico) Monica Puig	(Czech Republic) Kristýna Plíšková (WC)	(Serbia) Jelena Janković [7]
(Croatia) Mirjana Lučić-Baroni	(Sweden) Johanna Larsson	(Chinese Taipei) Hsieh Su-wei	(Spain) Garbiñe Muguruza [27]
(Germany) Julia Görges	(Argentina) Paula Ormaechea	(Romania) Monica Niculescu	(Canada) Aleksandra Wozniak (Q)
(Italy) Sara Errani [14]	(Bulgaria) Tsvetana Pironkova	(Ukraine) Elina Svitolina	(Japan) Kimiko Date-Krumm
(Russia) Svetlana Kuznetsova [28]	(Switzerland) Stefanie Vögele	(Estonia) Anett Kontaveit (Q)	(Romania) Andreea Mitu (Q)
(Czech Republic) Andrea Hlaváčková	(Switzerland) Romina Oprandi	(Germany) Anna-Lena Friedsam	(Spain) María Teresa Torró Flor
(United States) Sloane Stephens [18]	(United Kingdom) Johanna Konta	(Russia) Alisa Kleybanova	(Slovakia) Jana Čepelová
(Israel) Shahar Pe'er	(Hungary) Tímea Babos	(New Zealand) Marina Erakovic	(Australia) Samantha Stosur [17]
(Austria) Patricia Mayr-Achleitner	(Russia) Alla Kudryavtseva (Q)	(United States) Vania King	(Poland) Paula Kania (Q)

== Champions ==
=== Seniors ===
==== Men's singles ====
(Serbia) Novak Djokovic def. (Switzerland) Roger Federer, 6–7^{(7–9)}, 6–4, 7–6^{(7–4)}, 5–7, 6–4

==== Women's singles ====
(Czech Republic) Petra Kvitová def. (Canada) Eugenie Bouchard, 6–3, 6–0

==== Men's doubles ====
(Canada) Vasek Pospisil / (United States) Jack Sock def. (United States) Bob Bryan / (United States) Mike Bryan, 7–6^{(7–5)}, 6–7^{(3–7)}, 6–4, 3–6, 7–5

==== Women's doubles ====
(Italy) Sara Errani / (Italy) Roberta Vinci def. (Hungary) Tímea Babos / (France) Kristina Mladenovic, 6–1, 6–3

==== Mixed doubles ====
(Serbia) Nenad Zimonjić / (Australia) Samantha Stosur def. (Belarus) Max Mirnyi / (Chinese Taipei) Chan Hao-ching, 6–4, 6–2

=== Juniors ===
==== Boys' singles ====
(United States) Noah Rubin def. (United States) Stefan Kozlov, 6–4, 4–6, 6–3

==== Girls' singles ====
(Latvia) Jeļena Ostapenko def. (Slovakia) Kristína Schmiedlová, 2–6, 6–3, 6–0

==== Boys' doubles ====
(Brazil) Orlando Luz / (Brazil) Marcelo Zormann def. (United States) Stefan Kozlov / (Russia) Andrey Rublev, 6–4, 3–6, 8–6

==== Girls' doubles ====
(Indonesia) Tami Grende / (China) Ye Qiuyu def. (Czech Republic) Marie Bouzková / (Hungary) Dalma Gálfi, 6–2, 7–6^{(7–5)}

=== Invitation ===
==== Gentlemen's invitation doubles ====
(Sweden) Thomas Enqvist / (Australia) Mark Philippoussis def. (Netherlands) Jacco Eltingh / (Netherlands) Paul Haarhuis, 3–6, 6–3, [10–3]

==== Ladies' invitation doubles ====
(Czech Republic) Jana Novotná / (Austria) Barbara Schett def. (United States) Martina Navratilova / (Tunisia) Selima Sfar, 6–0, 7–6^{(7–2)}

==== Senior gentlemen's invitation doubles ====
(France) Guy Forget / (France) Cédric Pioline def. (United States) Rick Leach / (Australia) Mark Woodforde, 6–4, 6–3

=== Wheelchair ===
==== Wheelchair men's doubles ====
(France) Stéphane Houdet / (Japan) Shingo Kunieda def. (Netherlands) Maikel Scheffers / (Netherlands) Ronald Vink, 5–7, 6–0, 6–3

==== Wheelchair women's doubles ====
(Japan) Yui Kamiji / (United Kingdom) Jordanne Whiley def. (Netherlands) Jiske Griffioen / (Netherlands) Aniek van Koot, 2–6, 6–2, 7–5

== Singles seeds ==
=== Gentlemen's singles ===
The Gentlemen's singles seeds are adjusted on a surface-based system to reflect more accurately the individual player's grass court achievement as per the following formula, which applies to the top 32 players, according to ATP ranking on 16 June 2014:

- Take Entry System Position (ESP) points at 16 June 2014
- Add 100% points earned for all grass court tournaments in the past 12 months (16.06.2013 – 15.06.2014).
- Add 75% points earned for best grass court tournament in the 12 months before that (12.06.2012 – 15.06.2013)

Rankings are as of 16 June 2014 and Points Before in the following table are as of 23 June 2014.

Seed	Rank	Player	Points before	Points defending	Points won	Points after	Status
1	2	(Serbia) Novak Djokovic	12,330	1,200	2,000	13,130	Champion, defeated (Switzerland) Roger Federer [4]
2	1	(Spain) Rafael Nadal	12,500	10	180	12,670	Fourth round lost to (Australia) Nick Kyrgios [WC]
3	5	(United Kingdom) Andy Murray	4,680	2,000	360	3,040	Quarterfinals lost to (Bulgaria) Grigor Dimitrov [11]
4	4	(Switzerland) Roger Federer	4,945	45	1,200	6,100	Runner-up, lost to (Serbia) Novak Djokovic [1]
5	3	(Switzerland) Stan Wawrinka	5,420	10	360	5,770	Quarterfinals lost to (Switzerland) Roger Federer [4]
6	6	(Czech Republic) Tomáš Berdych	4,680	360	90	4,410	Third round lost to (Croatia) Marin Čilić [26]
7	7	(Spain) David Ferrer	4,190	360	45	3,875	Second round lost to (Russia) Andrey Kuznetsov
8	9	(Canada) Milos Raonic	3,245	45	720	3,920	Semifinals lost to (Switzerland) Roger Federer [4]
9	11	(United States) John Isner	2,690	45	90	2,735	Third round lost to (Spain) Feliciano López [19]
10	12	(Japan) Kei Nishikori	2,690	90	180	2,780	Fourth round lost to (Canada) Milos Raonic [8]
11	13	(Bulgaria) Grigor Dimitrov	2,595	45	720	3,270	Semifinals lost to (Serbia) Novak Djokovic [1]
12	10	(Latvia) Ernests Gulbis	2,725	90	45	2,680	Second round lost to (Ukraine) Sergiy Stakhovsky
13	14	(France) Richard Gasquet	2,415	90	45	2,370	Second round lost to (Australia) Nick Kyrgios [WC]
14	17	(France) Jo-Wilfried Tsonga	1,775	45	180	1,910	Fourth round lost to (Serbia) Novak Djokovic [1]
15	24	(Poland) Jerzy Janowicz	1,510	720	90	880	Third round lost to (Spain) Tommy Robredo [23]
16	15	(Italy) Fabio Fognini	2,155	10	90	2,235	Third round lost to (South Africa) Kevin Anderson [20]
17	16	(Russia) Mikhail Youzhny	1,790	180	45	1,655	Second round lost to (Chinese Taipei) Jimmy Wang [Q]
18	23	(Spain) Fernando Verdasco	1,555	360	10	1,205	First round lost to (Australia) Marinko Matosevic
19	25	(Spain) Feliciano López	1,455	90	180	1,545	Fourth round lost to (Switzerland) Stan Wawrinka [5]
20	18	(South Africa) Kevin Anderson	1,745	90	180	1,835	Fourth round lost to (United Kingdom) Andy Murray [3]
21	19	(Ukraine) Alexandr Dolgopolov	1,680	90	90	1,680	Third round lost to (Bulgaria) Grigor Dimitrov [11]
22	27	(Germany) Philipp Kohlschreiber	1,440	10	45	1,475	Second round lost to (Italy) Simone Bolelli [LL]
23	22	(Spain) Tommy Robredo	1,630	90	180	1,720	Fourth round lost to (Switzerland) Roger Federer [4]
24	21	(France) Gaël Monfils	1,635	(20)^{†}	45	1,660	Second round lost to (Czech Republic) Jiří Veselý [WC]
25	34	(Italy) Andreas Seppi	1,105	180	10	935	First round lost to (Argentina) Leonardo Mayer
26	29	(Croatia) Marin Čilić	1,350	45	360	1,665	Quarterfinals lost to (Serbia) Novak Djokovic [1]
27	28	(Spain) Roberto Bautista Agut	1,580	45	90	1,625	Third round lost to (United Kingdom) Andy Murray [3]
28	31	(Spain) Guillermo García López	1,163	10	10	1,163	First round lost to (Serbia) Dušan Lajović
29	33	(Croatia) Ivo Karlović	1,181	(16)^{†}	10	1,175	First round lost to (Canada) Frank Dancevic [LL]
30	30	(Spain) Marcel Granollers	1,250	10	45	1,285	Second round lost to (Colombia) Santiago Giraldo
31	35	(Canada) Vasek Pospisil	1,170	45	10	1,135	First round lost to (Netherlands) Robin Haase
32	32	(Russia) Dmitry Tursunov	1,200	10	10	1,200	First round lost to (Uzbekistan) Denis Istomin

†The player did not qualify for the tournament in 2013. Accordingly, this was the 18th best result deducted instead.

==== Withdrawn players ====
Rank	Player	Points before	Points defending	Points after	Withdrawal reason
8	(Argentina) Juan Martín del Potro	4,080	720	3,360	Wrist injury
20	(Germany) Tommy Haas	1,655	180	1,475	Shoulder injury
26	(Spain) Nicolás Almagro	1,450	90	1,360	Foot injury

=== Women's singles ===
For the Women's singles seeds, the seeding order follows the ranking list, except where in the opinion of the committee, the grass court credentials of a particular player necessitates a change in the interest of achieving a balanced draw.

Seed	Rank	Player	Points before	Points defending	Points won	Points after	Status
1	1	(United States) Serena Williams	9,660	280	130	9,510	Third round lost to (France) Alizé Cornet [25]
2	2	(China) Li Na	7,330	500	130	6,960	Third round lost to (Czech Republic) Barbora Záhlavová-Strýcová
3	3	(Romania) Simona Halep	6,105	100	780	6,785	Semifinals lost to (Canada) Eugenie Bouchard [13]
4	4	(Poland) Agnieszka Radwańska	5,990	900	240	5,330	Fourth round lost to (Russia) Ekaterina Makarova [22]
5	5	(Russia) Maria Sharapova	4,741	100	240	4,881	Fourth round lost to (Germany) Angelique Kerber [9]
6	6	(Czech Republic) Petra Kvitová	4,570	500	2,000	6,070	Champion, defeated (Canada) Eugenie Bouchard [13]
7	8	(Serbia) Jelena Janković	3,990	100	10	3,900	First round lost to (Estonia) Kaia Kanepi
8	9	(Belarus) Victoria Azarenka	3,842	100	70	3,812	Second round lost to (Serbia) Bojana Jovanovski
9	7	(Germany) Angelique Kerber	4,035	100	430	4,365	Quarterfinals lost to (Canada) Eugenie Bouchard [13]
10	10	(Slovakia) Dominika Cibulková	3,666	160	130	3,636	Third round lost to (Czech Republic) Lucie Šafářová [23]
11	11	(Serbia) Ana Ivanovic	3,630	100	130	3,660	Third round lost to (Germany) Sabine Lisicki [19]
12	12	(Italy) Flavia Pennetta	3,378	280	70	3,168	Second round lost to (United States) Lauren Davis
13	13	(Canada) Eugenie Bouchard	3,320	160	1,300	4,460	Runner-up, lost to (Czech Republic) Petra Kvitová [6]
14	14	(Italy) Sara Errani	3,120	5	10	3,125	First round lost to (France) Caroline Garcia
15	15	(Spain) Carla Suárez Navarro	2,905	280	70	2,695	Second round lost to (Kazakhstan) Zarina Diyas
16	16	(Denmark) Caroline Wozniacki	2,685	100	240	2,825	Fourth round lost to (Czech Republic) Barbora Záhlavová-Strýcová
17	17	(Australia) Samantha Stosur	2,565	160	10	2,415	First round lost to (Belgium) Yanina Wickmayer
18	18	(United States) Sloane Stephens	2,540	500	10	2,050	First round lost to (Russia) Maria Kirilenko
19	19	(Germany) Sabine Lisicki	2,397	1,400	430	1,427	Quarterfinals lost to (Romania) Simona Halep [3]
20	20	(Germany) Andrea Petkovic	2,205	100	130	2,235	Third round lost to (Canada) Eugenie Bouchard [13]
21	21	(Italy) Roberta Vinci	2,150	280	10	1,880	First round lost to (Croatia) Donna Vekić
22	22	(Russia) Ekaterina Makarova	2,110	160	430	2,380	Quarterfinals lost to (Czech Republic) Lucie Šafářová [23]
23	23	(Czech Republic) Lucie Šafářová	1,995	100	780	2,675	Semifinals lost to (Czech Republic) Petra Kvitová [6]
24	26	(Belgium) Kirsten Flipkens	1,880	900	130	1,110	Third round lost to (Germany) Angelique Kerber [9]
25	24	(France) Alizé Cornet	1,995	160	240	2,075	Fourth round lost to (Canada) Eugenie Bouchard [13]
26	25	(Russia) Anastasia Pavlyuchenkova	1,885	5	10	1,890	First round lost to (United States) Alison Riske
27	28	(Spain) Garbiñe Muguruza	1,625	100	10	1,535	First round lost to (United States) CoCo Vandeweghe
28	27	(Russia) Svetlana Kuznetsova	1,636	0	10	1,646	First round lost to (Portugal) Michelle Larcher de Brito [Q]
29	29	(Romania) Sorana Cîrstea	1,611	100	10	1,521	First round lost to (United States) Victoria Duval [Q]
30	31	(United States) Venus Williams	1,596	0	130	1,726	Third round lost to (Czech Republic) Petra Kvitová [6]
31	32	(Czech Republic) Klára Koukalová	1,535	160	70	1,445	Second round lost to (United States) Madison Keys
32	49	(Russia) Elena Vesnina	1,105	100	70	1,075	Second round lost to (Czech Republic) Barbora Záhlavová-Strýcová

== Doubles seeds ==
=== Men's doubles ===
Team		Rank^{1}	Seed
(United States) Bob Bryan	(United States) Mike Bryan	2	1
(Austria) Alexander Peya	(Brazil) Bruno Soares	6	2
(Canada) Daniel Nestor	(Serbia) Nenad Zimonjić	14	3
(France) Julien Benneteau	(France) Édouard Roger-Vasselin	21	4
(India) Leander Paes	(Czech Republic) Radek Štěpánek	23	5
(Spain) Marcel Granollers	(Spain) Marc López	34	6
(Poland) Łukasz Kubot	(Sweden) Robert Lindstedt	34	7
(India) Rohan Bopanna	(Pakistan) Aisam-ul-Haq Qureshi	38	8
(Austria) Julian Knowle	(Brazil) Marcelo Melo	45	9
(Philippines) Treat Huey	(United Kingdom) Dominic Inglot	48	10
(Netherlands) Jean-Julien Rojer	(Romania) Horia Tecău	48	11
(France) Michaël Llodra	(France) Nicolas Mahut	53	12
(United States) Eric Butorac	(South Africa) Raven Klaasen	58	13
(United Kingdom) Jamie Murray	(Australia) John Peers	59	14
(Colombia) Juan Sebastián Cabal	(Poland) Marcin Matkowski	63	15
(Uruguay) Pablo Cuevas	(Spain) David Marrero	70	16

- ^{1} Rankings are as of 16 June 2014.

=== Women's doubles ===
Team		Rank^{1}	Seed
(Chinese Taipei) Hsieh Su-wei	(China) Peng Shuai	2	1
(Italy) Sara Errani	(Italy) Roberta Vinci	6	2
(Czech Republic) Květa Peschke	(Slovenia) Katarina Srebotnik	12	3
(Zimbabwe) Cara Black	(India) Sania Mirza	16	4
(Russia) Ekaterina Makarova	(Russia) Elena Vesnina	17	5
(Australia) Ashleigh Barty	(Australia) Casey Dellacqua	25	6
(United States) Raquel Kops-Jones	(United States) Abigail Spears	28	7
(United States) Serena Williams	(United States) Venus Williams	31^{2}	8
(Czech Republic) Andrea Hlaváčková	(China) Zheng Jie	39	9
(Germany) Julia Görges	(Germany) Anna-Lena Grönefeld	39	10
(Russia) Alla Kudryavtseva	(Australia) Anastasia Rodionova	40	11
(Spain) Anabel Medina Garrigues	(Kazakhstan) Yaroslava Shvedova	45	12
(Czech Republic) Lucie Hradecká	(Netherlands) Michaëlla Krajicek	46	13
(Hungary) Tímea Babos	(France) Kristina Mladenovic	61	14
(United States) Liezel Huber	(United States) Lisa Raymond	66	15
(Spain) Garbiñe Muguruza	(Spain) Carla Suárez Navarro	68	16

- ^{1} Rankings are as of 16 June 2014.
- ^{2} Based on singles rankings.

=== Mixed doubles ===
Team		Rank^{1}	Seed
(United States) Mike Bryan	(Slovenia) Katarina Srebotnik	6	1
(United States) Bob Bryan	(Czech Republic) Květa Peschke	8	2
(Austria) Alexander Peya	(United States) Abigail Spears	17	3
(India) Leander Paes	(Zimbabwe) Cara Black	23	4
(Canada) Daniel Nestor	(France) Kristina Mladenovic	31	5
(Romania) Horia Tecău	(India) Sania Mirza	32	6
(India) Rohan Bopanna	(Czech Republic) Andrea Hlaváčková	33	7
(Netherlands) Jean-Julien Rojer	(Germany) Anna-Lena Grönefeld	40	8
(Spain) David Marrero	(Spain) Arantxa Parra Santonja	40	9
(United Kingdom) Jamie Murray	(Australia) Casey Dellacqua	41	10
(Colombia) Juan Sebastián Cabal	(United States) Raquel Kops-Jones	41	11
(Australia) John Peers	(Australia) Ashleigh Barty	43	12
(Brazil) Bruno Soares	(Switzerland) Martina Hingis	46	13
(Belarus) Max Mirnyi	(Chinese Taipei) Chan Hao-ching	50	14
(Serbia) Nenad Zimonjić	(Australia) Samantha Stosur	54	15
(Pakistan) Aisam-ul-Haq Qureshi	(Russia) Vera Dushevina	55	16

- ^{1} Rankings are as of 23 June 2014.

== Main draw wild card entries ==
The following players received wild cards into the main draw senior events.

=== Men's singles ===
- (Cyprus) Marcos Baghdatis
- (United Kingdom) Daniel Cox
- (United Kingdom) Kyle Edmund
- (United Kingdom) Dan Evans
- (Australia) Nick Kyrgios
- (United Kingdom) Daniel Smethurst
- (Czech Republic) Jiří Veselý
- (United Kingdom) James Ward

=== Women's singles ===
- (United Kingdom) Naomi Broady
- (Australia) Jarmila Gajdošová
- (United Kingdom) Tara Moore
- (United Kingdom) Samantha Murray
- (Czech Republic) Kristýna Plíšková
- (Spain) Sílvia Soler Espinosa
- (United States) Taylor Townsend
- (Russia) Vera Zvonareva

=== Men's doubles ===
- (United Kingdom) Edward Corrie / (United Kingdom) Daniel Smethurst
- (United Kingdom) Jamie Delgado / (Luxembourg) Gilles Müller
- (United Kingdom) Kyle Edmund / (Ukraine) Sergiy Stakhovsky
- (United Kingdom) Dan Evans / (United Kingdom) James Ward
- (United Kingdom) Colin Fleming / (United Kingdom) Ross Hutchins

=== Women's doubles ===
- (United Kingdom) Naomi Broady / (Greece) Eleni Daniilidou
- (Switzerland) Martina Hingis / (Russia) Vera Zvonareva
- (United Kingdom) Johanna Konta / (United Kingdom) Tara Moore
- (United Kingdom) Jocelyn Rae / (United Kingdom) Anna Smith

=== Mixed doubles ===
- (United Kingdom) Colin Fleming / (United Kingdom) Jocelyn Rae
- (United Kingdom) Ross Hutchins / (United Kingdom) Heather Watson
- (United Kingdom) Neal Skupski / (United Kingdom) Naomi Broady
- (United Kingdom) James Ward / (United Kingdom) Anna Smith

== Qualifiers entries ==
Below are the lists of the qualifiers entering in the main draws.

=== Men's singles ===
Men's singles qualifiers

1. (Australia) Luke Saville
2. (Australia) James Duckworth
3. (United States) Alex Kuznetsov
4. (Luxembourg) Gilles Müller
5. (Croatia) Ante Pavić
6. (Russia) Konstantin Kravchuk
7. (Turkey) Marsel İlhan
8. (Japan) Yūichi Sugita
9. (United States) Denis Kudla
10. (Chinese Taipei) Jimmy Wang
11. (France) Pierre-Hugues Herbert
12. (Germany) Tim Pütz
13. (Australia) Sam Groth
14. (Japan) Tatsuma Ito
15. (Czech Republic) Jan Hernych
16. (United States) Ryan Harrison

Lucky losers

1. (Tunisia) Malek Jaziri
2. (Canada) Frank Dancevic
3. (Italy) Simone Bolelli
4. (Slovenia) Aljaž Bedene

=== Women's singles ===
Women's singles qualifiers

1. (Russia) Alla Kudryavtseva
2. (Czech Republic) Tereza Smitková
3. (Switzerland) Timea Bacsinszky
4. (Portugal) Michelle Larcher de Brito
5. (Canada) Aleksandra Wozniak
6. (Ukraine) Lesia Tsurenko
7. (Poland) Paula Kania
8. (Croatia) Ana Konjuh
9. (United States) Victoria Duval
10. (Austria) Tamira Paszek
11. (Estonia) Anett Kontaveit
12. (Romania) Andreea Mitu

=== Men's doubles ===
Men's doubles qualifiers

1. (Brazil) Marcelo Demoliner / (India) Purav Raja
2. (Sweden) Andreas Siljeström / (Slovakia) Igor Zelenay
3. (United States) Ryan Harrison / (United States) Kevin King
4. (Australia) Alex Bolt / (Australia) Andrew Whittington

=== Women's doubles ===
Women's doubles qualifiers

1. (Ukraine) Lyudmyla Kichenok / (Ukraine) Nadiia Kichenok
2. (Australia) Jarmila Gajdošová / (Australia) Arina Rodionova
3. (France) Pauline Parmentier / (France) Laura Thorpe
4. (Serbia) Vesna Dolonc / (Chile) Daniela Seguel

Lucky losers

1. (Ukraine) Yuliya Beygelzimer / (Poland) Klaudia Jans-Ignacik

== Protected ranking ==
The following players were accepted directly into the main draw using a protected ranking:

Men's Singles

- (Uruguay) Pablo Cuevas (PR 54)
- (Estonia) Jürgen Zopp (PR 88)

== Withdrawals ==
The following players were accepted directly into the main tournament, but withdrew with injuries or personal reasons.

Men's Singles

- (Spain) Nicolás Almagro → replaced by (Slovenia) Aljaž Bedene
- (Russia) Nikolay Davydenko → replaced by (France) Adrian Mannarino
- (Argentina) Juan Martín del Potro → replaced by (Austria) Andreas Haider-Maurer
- (Croatia) Ivan Dodig → replaced by (Italy) Simone Bolelli
- (Germany) Tommy Haas → replaced by (Canada) Frank Dancevic
- (Germany) Florian Mayer → replaced by (Poland) Michał Przysiężny
- (Argentina) Juan Mónaco → replaced by (Russia) Andrey Kuznetsov
- (Spain) Albert Montañés → replaced by (Tunisia) Malek Jaziri
- (Serbia) Janko Tipsarević → replaced by (Belgium) David Goffin

Women's Singles

- (United States) Jamie Hampton → replaced by (United Kingdom) Heather Watson
- (United States) Bethanie Mattek-Sands → replaced by (Hungary) Tímea Babos
- (United Kingdom) Laura Robson → replaced by (Czech Republic) Andrea Hlaváčková
- (Kazakhstan) Galina Voskoboeva → replaced by (Chinese Taipei) Hsieh Su-wei

== See also ==
- Air Navigation (Restriction of Flying) (Wimbledon) Regulations 2014

Preceded by 2014 French Open	Grand Slam tournaments	Succeeded by 2014 US Open
