= 2014 Fed Cup Asia/Oceania Zone Group I – play-offs =

The play-offs of the 2014 Fed Cup Asia/Oceania Zone Group I were the final stages of the Group I Zonal Competition involving teams from Asia and Oceania. Using the positions determined in their pools, the seven teams faced off to determine their placing in the 2014 Fed Cup Asia/Oceania Zone Group I. The top two teams advanced to World Group II play-offs, and the bottom two teams were relegated down to the Asia/Oceania Zone Group II.

== Pool results ==
Placing	Pool A	Pool B
1	Thailand	Uzbekistan
2	Kazakhstan	China
3	N/A	South Korea
4	Indonesia	Chinese Taipei

== Promotion play-off ==
The first placed teams of the two pools were drawn in head-to-head rounds. The winner advanced to the World Group II play-offs.

=== Thailand vs. Uzbekistan ===
Thailand
2
National Tennis Centre, Astana, Kazakhstan
8 February 2014
Hard (indoors)

Uzbekistan
1

			1	2	3
1	(Thailand) (Uzbekistan)	Noppawan Lertcheewakarn; Sabina Sharipova	6^{5} 7^{7}	4; 6
2	(Thailand) (Uzbekistan)	Luksika Kumkhum; Nigina Abduraimova	7^{7} 6^{3}	7; 5
3	(Thailand) (Uzbekistan)	Luksika Kumkhum / Tamarine Tanasugarn; Nigina Abduraimova / Sabina Sharipova	6; 3	3; 6	6; 4

== 3rd place play-off ==
The second placed teams of the two pools were drawn in head-to-head rounds to find third place teams.

=== Kazakhstan vs. China ===
Kazakhstan
2
National Tennis Centre, Astana, Kazakhstan
8 February 2014
Hard (indoors)

China
0

			1	2	3
1	(Kazakhstan) (China)	Sesil Karatantcheva; Liu Fangzhou	4; 6	6; 1	6; 1
2	(Kazakhstan) (China)	Yulia Putintseva; Wang Qiang	0; 6	6; 3	6; 1
3	(Kazakhstan) (China)	Sesil Karatantcheva / Yulia Putintseva; Liu Fangzhou / Wang Qiang				not played

== Relegation play-off ==
The last placed teams of the two pools were drawn in head-to-head rounds. The loser was relegated down to Asia/Oceania Zone Group II in 2015.

=== Indonesia vs. Chinese Taipei ===
Indonesia
0
National Tennis Centre, Astana, Kazakhstan
8 February 2014
Hard (indoors)

Chinese Taipei
2

			1	2	3
1	(Indonesia) (Chinese Taipei)	Tami Grende; Yang Chia-hsien	6^{5} 7^{7}	4; 6
2	(Indonesia) (Chinese Taipei)	Lavinia Tananta; Chan Chin-wei	4; 6	7^{7} 6^{5}	4; 6
3	(Indonesia) (Chinese Taipei)	Tami Grende / Lavinia Tananta; Chan Chin-wei / Lee Ya-hsuan				not played

== Final placements ==
Placing	Teams
Promoted	Thailand
Second	Uzbekistan
Third	Kazakhstan
Fourth	China
Fifth	South Korea
Sixth	Chinese Taipei
Relegated	Indonesia

- Thailand advanced to World Group II play-offs.
- Indonesia were relegated to Asia/Oceania Group II in 2015.

== See also ==
- Fed Cup structure
