= Yull Shoes =

British footwear brand

- Type: Private
- Industry: Footwear
- Founded: 2011; 15 years ago
- Founder: Sarah Watkinson-Yull
- Headquarters: London, United Kingdom
- Website: yull.co.uk

Yull Shoes is a London-based footwear brand founded by designer Sarah Watkinson-Yull. She started her own label in 2011 after help from the Prince's Trust at the age of 21.

== Overview ==
Initially, the shoes were manufactured in China and imported to Britain.

A 2012 loan from the Prince's Trust partially funded a shift in manufacturing from China to domestic production in Northampton and subsequently London.

Yull is one of the only independent shoe brands manufacturing high heels in Britain, and focuses on the international as opposed to domestic market.

== See also ==
- Elevate your sole
- Bacup Shoe Company
