= 2014 Fed Cup Asia/Oceania Zone Group I – Pool A =

Pool A of the 2014 Fed Cup Asia/Oceania Group I was one of two pools in the Asia/Oceania Group I of the 2014 Fed Cup. Three teams competed in a round robin competition, with the top team and the bottom two teams proceeding to their respective sections of the play-offs: the top team played for advancement to the World Group II Play-offs, while the bottom team faced potential relegation to Group II.

== Standings ==
		(Kazakhstan) KAZ	(Indonesia) INA	(Thailand) THA	RR; W–L	Set; W–L	Game; W–L	Standings
19	Kazakhstan		3–0	1–2	4–2	9–4	63–34	2
41	Indonesia	0–3		0–3	0–6	0–12	25–73	3
29	Thailand	2–1	3–0		62–43	6–0	62–43	1

== Round-robin ==
=== Indonesia vs. Thailand ===
Indonesia
0
National Tennis Centre, Astana, Kazakhstan
5 February 2014
Hard (indoors)

Thailand
3

			1	2	3
1	(Indonesia) (Thailand)	Deria Nur Haliza; Noppawan Lertcheewakarn	3; 6	2; 6
2	(Indonesia) (Thailand)	Lavinia Tananta; Luksika Kumkhum	6^{5} 7^{7}	0; 6
3	(Indonesia) (Thailand)	Tami Grende / Lavinia Tananta; Tamarine Tanasugarn / Varatchaya Wongteanchai	2; 6	3; 6

=== Kazakhstan vs. Indonesia ===
Kazakhstan
3
National Tennis Centre, Astana, Kazakhstan
6 February 2014
Hard (indoors)

Indonesia
0

			1	2	3
1	(Kazakhstan) (Indonesia)	Yulia Putintseva; Vita Taher	6; 2	6; 1
2	(Kazakhstan) (Indonesia)	Yaroslava Shvedova; Lavinia Tananta	6; 3	6; 1
3	(Kazakhstan) (Indonesia)	Yulia Putintseva / Galina Voskoboeva; Tami Grende / Vita Taher	6; 1	6; 1

=== Kazakhstan vs. Thailand ===
Kazakhstan
1
National Tennis Centre, Astana, Kazakhstan
7 February 2014
Hard (indoors)

Thailand
2

			1	2	3
1	(Kazakhstan) (Thailand)	Yulia Putintseva; Noppawan Lertcheewakarn	6; 4	6; 3
2	(Kazakhstan) (Thailand)	Yaroslava Shvedova; Luksika Kumkhum	6; 0	4; 6	1; 6
3	(Kazakhstan) (Thailand)	Yaroslava Shvedova / Galina Voskoboeva; Luksika Kumkhum / Tamarine Tanasugarn	4; 6	6^{3} 7^{7}
