= Mr Hare =

British fashion brand

- Industry: Fashion
- Founded: 2008; 18 years ago
- Defunct: 2016
- Headquarters: London, England, United Kingdom
- Products: Shoes
- Website: mrhare.com

Mr Hare was a British footwear brand created by Marc Hare in 2008. The brand ceased trading in October 2016 and closed its Mayfair and Notting Hill stores. The Guardian reported in 2012 that: "Mr Hare is quietly becoming one of the most important names in British menswear."

== Background ==
Hare decided to open his own brand after the realisation that there were not enough shoes that he liked. He was at a roadside tapas bar in the Sierra Nevada Mountains, Spain on 23 July 2008, when he looked at an older gentleman's shoes and decided that, with a few tweaks, they could be much better. It took 360 days for his first creation to land on the shop floor at Dover Street Market, London.

The first Mr Hare store opened in Mayfair in September 2012, following on from the success of sales in stores such as Harrods and Selfridges. Other stockists include Liberty, Colette, Dover Street Market, Matches Fashion and Mr Porter. Robert Downey Jr., Javier Bardem, Tom Hardy, Amir Khan, Jefferson Hack, ASAP Rocky and Tinie Tempah were reported to be fans of the brand.

== Collaborations ==
In August 2011, Hare collaborated with Topman on a ten-style shoe collection. In 2011, there was a collaboration with jewellery designer Bunney to create a limited edition shoehorn, in garnet and black spinel.

In 2012, Mr Hare collaborated with the Savile Row-based couturier Hardy Amies, producing a range of shoes and boots with laser-etched leather and metal toecaps for the AW12 collection.

== See also ==
- Dolcis Shoes
- Elevate your sole
