= Tami Grende =

Indonesian tennis player

- Country (sports): Indonesia
- Born: 22 June 1997 (age 29) Denpasar, Bali, Indonesia

Singles
- Career record: 0–1

Grand Slam singles results
- Australian Open Junior: 1R (2015)
- French Open Junior: Q1 (2014)
- Wimbledon Junior: 2R (2014)
- US Open Junior: 2R (2014)

Doubles
- Career record: 0–0

Grand Slam doubles results
- Australian Open Junior: 1R (2015)
- French Open Junior: 1R (2014)
- Wimbledon Junior: W (2014)
- US Open Junior: QF (2014)

Team competitions
- Fed Cup: 0–3

Tami Grende (born 22 June 1997, in Denpasar) is an Indonesian tennis player of Italian descent. As a junior, Tami had a career-high world ranking of 36, achieved on January 19, 2015.

Playing for Indonesia at the Fed Cup, Tami had a win–loss record of 0–3.

== Early and personal life ==
Tami Grende was born in Denpasar, Bali, Indonesia. Her father, Olivier, is an entrepreneur, and her mother, Luh, is a homemaker. Tami has two siblings, Ayu and Paz. Tami graduated high school from CHIS, a school which she attended since the first grade. She then went to graduate with a communications degree from the University of Washington in Seattle, Washington.

Tami has won the Wimbledon girls' doubles title with her Chinese partner Ye Qiuyu after beating Czech Marie Bouzková and Hungarian Dalma Gálfi 6–2, 7–6^{(5)}. Tami also participated in the girls' singles event where she was defeated by host player Gabriella Taylor 4–6, 4–6 in the second round.

== Junior Grand Slam finals ==
=== Doubles: 1 (title) ===
Result	Year	Tournament	Surface	Partner	Opponents	Score	Ref
Win	2014	Wimbledon	Grass	(China) Ye Qiuyu	(Czech Republic) Marie Bouzková (Hungary) Dalma Gálfi	6–2, 7–6^{(5)}	

== ITF Junior Circuit finals ==
=== Singles: 8 (4 titles, 4 runner-ups) ===
Legend Category GA Category G1 Category G2 Category G3 Category G4 Category G5	Finals by surface Hard (4–4) Clay (0–0) Grass (0–0) Carpet (0–0)

Result	W–L	Date	Tournament	Tier	Surface	Opponent	Score
Win	1–0	Mar 2011	ITF Malacca, Malaysia	G4	Hard	(Chinese Taipei) Hsu Ching-wen	6–3, 6–0
Win	2–0	Jun 2011	ITF Jakarta, Indonesia	G4	Hard	(Indonesia) Dina Karina	6–3, 6–1
Loss	2–1	Jul 2011	ITF Nonthaburi, Thailand	G4	Hard	(China) Zhu Ai Wen	6–4, 1–6, 1–6
Loss	2–2	Oct 2011	ITF Nonthaburi, Thailand	G2	Hard	(Indonesia) Aldila Sutjiadi	0–6, 2–6
Loss	2–3	Mar 2013	ITF Malacca, Malaysia	G4	Hard	(Japan) Kyoka Okamura	0–6, 6–2, 4–6
Win	3–3	Jun 2013	ITF Jakarta, Indonesia	G4	Hard	(India) Sri Vaishnavi Peddi Reddy	7–5, 6–1
Loss	3–4	Jun 2013	ITF Solo, Indonesia	G4	Hard	(Indonesia) Deria Nur Haliza	2–6, 5–7
Win	4–4	Mar 2014	ITF Sarawak, Malaysia	G1	Hard	(China) Xu Shilin	7–5, 6–3

=== Doubles: 7 (6 titles, 1 runner-up) ===
Legend Category GA Category G1 Category G2 Category G3 Category G4 Category G5	Finals by surface Hard (5–1) Clay (0–0) Grass (1–0) Carpet (0–0)

Result	W–L	Date	Tournament	Tier	Surface	Partner	Opponents	Score
Win	1–0	Jun 2011	ITF Jakarta, Indonesia	G4	Hard	(India) Kanika Vaidya	(Chinese Taipei) Cheng Hsin-ping (Chinese Taipei) Pei Yu Sieh	7–6^{(3)}, 6–2
Win	2–0	Oct 2011	Hong Kong Open Junior	G4	Hard	(Japan) Yuriko Lily Miyazaki	(China) Na Li (China) Xun Fangying	7–5, 6–2
Win	3–0	Nov 2011	ITF Nonthaburi, Thailand	G4	Hard	(Estonia) Tatjana Vorobjova	(Thailand) Nahathai Khuntaket (Thailand) Warissara Prajoubphansri	6–4, 0–6, [13–11]
Loss	3–1	Jun 2013	ITF Jakarta, Indonesia	G4	Hard	(Indonesia) Rifanty Kahfiani	(Hong Kong) Eudice Chong (Indonesia) Efriliya Herlina	1–6, 6–7^{(5)}
Win	4–1	Jun 2013	ITF Solo, Indonesia	G4	Hard	(Indonesia) Rifanty Kahfiani	(Indonesia) Deria Nur Haliza (Thailand) Yada Vasupongchai	6–3, 7–6^{(5)}
Win	5–1	Jul 2014	Wimbledon	GA	Grass	(China) Ye Qiuyu	(Czech Republic) Marie Bouzková (Hungary) Dalma Gálfi	6–2, 7–6^{(5)}
Win	6–1	Aug 2014	Canadian Open Junior	G1	Hard	(Romania) Elena Gabriela Ruse	(Japan) Chihiro Muramatsu (Japan) Yukina Saigo	7–5, 6–2

Note: Tournaments sourced from official ITF juniors archives

== National representation ==
=== Fed Cup participation ===
==== Singles (0–1) ====
Edition	Round	Date	Location	Against	Surface	Opponent	W/L	Score
2014	Z1 P/O	Feb 2014	Astana (Kazakhstan)	Chinese Taipei	Hard	Yang Chia-hsien	L	6–7, 4–6

==== Doubles (0–2) ====
Edition	Stage	Date	Location	Against	Surface	Partner	Opponents	W/L	Score
2014	Z1 RR	Feb 2014	Astana (Kazakhstan)	Thailand	Hard	Lavinia Tananta	Tamarine Tanasugarn; Varatchaya Wongteanchai	L	2–6, 3–6
2014	Z1 RR	Feb 2014	Astana (Kazakhstan)	Kazakhstan	Hard	Vita Taher	Yulia Putintseva; Galina Voskoboeva	L	1–6, 1–6
