= 2014 Wimbledon Championships – Women's doubles =

Women's doubles
- 2014 Wimbledon Championships

Final
- Champions: (Italy) Sara Errani (Italy) Roberta Vinci
- Runners-up: (Hungary) Tímea Babos (France) Kristina Mladenovic
- Score: 6–1, 6–3

Details
- Draw: 64 (4 Q / 4 WC )
- Seeds: 16

Events
Singles	men	women		boys	girls
Doubles	men	women	mixed	boys	girls
WC Singles	men	women	quad
WC Doubles	men	women	quad
Legends	men	women	seniors
← 2013 ·	Wimbledon Championships	· 2015 →

Hsieh Su-wei and Peng Shuai were the defending champions, but lost in the third round to Tímea Babos and Kristina Mladenovic.

Sara Errani and Roberta Vinci defeated Babos and Mladenovic in the final, 6–1, 6–3 to win the ladies' doubles tennis title at the 2014 Wimbledon Championships. With this victory the Italian pair completed a Career Grand Slam, becoming only the fifth pair in tennis history to complete the feat.

== Seeds ==
1. (Chinese Taipei) Hsieh Su-wei / (China) Peng Shuai (third round)
2. (Italy) Sara Errani / (Italy) Roberta Vinci (champions)
3. (Czech Republic) Květa Peschke / (Slovenia) Katarina Srebotnik (first round)
4. (Zimbabwe) Cara Black / (India) Sania Mirza (second round)
5. (Russia) Ekaterina Makarova / (Russia) Elena Vesnina (third round)
6. (Australia) Ashleigh Barty / (Australia) Casey Dellacqua (quarterfinals)
7. (United States) Raquel Kops-Jones / (United States) Abigail Spears (third round)
8. (United States) Serena Williams / (United States) Venus Williams (second round, retired)
9. (Czech Republic) Andrea Hlaváčková / (China) Zheng Jie (semifinals)
10. (Germany) Julia Görges / (Germany) Anna-Lena Grönefeld (quarterfinals)
11. (Russia) Alla Kudryavtseva / (Australia) Anastasia Rodionova (quarterfinals)
12. (Spain) Anabel Medina Garrigues / (Kazakhstan) Yaroslava Shvedova (third round)
13. (Czech Republic) Lucie Hradecká / (Netherlands) Michaëlla Krajicek (second round)
14. (Hungary) Tímea Babos / (France) Kristina Mladenovic (final)
15. (United States) Liezel Huber / (United States) Lisa Raymond (second round)
16. (Spain) Garbiñe Muguruza / (Spain) Carla Suárez Navarro (third round)

Click on the seed number of a player to go to their draw section.

== Draw ==
=== Key ===
- Q = Qualifier
- WC = Wild card
- LL = Lucky loser
- Alt = Alternate
- ITF = ITF entry
- PR = Protected ranking
- SR = Special ranking
- SE = Special exempt
- JE = Junior exempt
- JR = Junior Accelerator Programme entrant
- CO = College Accelerator Programme entrant
- NG = Next Gen Accelerator Program entrant
- w/o = Walkover
- r = Retired
- d = Defaulted

=== Finals ===
Quarterfinals
14	(Hungary) Tímea Babos (France) Kristina Mladenovic	6	3	6
11	(Russia) Alla Kudryavtseva (Australia) Anastasia Rodionova	3	6	4
(Germany) Andrea Petkovic (Slovakia) Magdaléna Rybáriková	6	7^{8}
10	(Germany) Julia Görges (Germany) Anna-Lena Grönefeld	1	6^{6}
9	(Czech Republic) Andrea Hlaváčková (China) Zheng Jie	6	4	6
(Russia) Anastasia Pavlyuchenkova (Czech Republic) Lucie Šafářová	1	6	3
6	(Australia) Ashleigh Barty (Australia) Casey Dellacqua	4	6	0
2	(Italy) Sara Errani (Italy) Roberta Vinci	6	2	6

Semifinals
14	(Hungary) Tímea Babos (France) Kristina Mladenovic	6	6
(Germany) Andrea Petkovic (Slovakia) Magdaléna Rybáriková	1	3
9	(Czech Republic) Andrea Hlaváčková (China) Zheng Jie	3	2
2	(Italy) Sara Errani (Italy) Roberta Vinci	6	6

Final
14	(Hungary) Tímea Babos (France) Kristina Mladenovic	1	3
2	(Italy) Sara Errani (Italy) Roberta Vinci	6	6

=== Top half ===
==== Section 1 ====
First round
1	(Chinese Taipei) S-w Hsieh (China) S Peng	6	7
(Croatia) D Jurak (United States) M Moulton-Levy	2	5
LL	(Ukraine) Y Beygelzimer (Poland) K Jans-Ignacik	6	6
(Slovakia) D Cibulková (Belgium) K Flipkens	4	4
(Switzerland) B Bencic (Bulgaria) T Pironkova	6	6
(Estonia) K Kanepi (United States) A Tatishvili	2	4
(Czech Republic) Ka Plíšková (Czech Republic) Kr Plíšková	3	7^{7}	10
14	(Hungary) T Babos (France) K Mladenovic	6	6^{5}	12
11	(Russia) A Kudryavtseva (Australia) An Rodionova	6	6
(Belgium) Y Wickmayer (China) S Zhang	1	3
(Czech Republic) P Cetkovská (United States) V King	6^{5}	2
(United States) M Keys (United States) A Riske	7^{7}	6
(France) A Cornet (France) C Garcia	6	2	6
(Chinese Taipei) H-c Chan (Chinese Taipei) Y-j Chan	3	6	4
WC	(United Kingdom) N Broady (Greece) E Daniilidou	6^{3}	5
7	(United States) R Kops-Jones (United States) A Spears	7^{7}	7

Second round
1	(Chinese Taipei) S-w Hsieh (China) S Peng	6	6
LL	(Ukraine) Y Beygelzimer (Poland) K Jans-Ignacik	3	3
(Switzerland) B Bencic (Bulgaria) T Pironkova	1	3
14	(Hungary) T Babos (France) K Mladenovic	6	6
11	(Russia) A Kudryavtseva (Australia) An Rodionova	6	6
(United States) M Keys (United States) A Riske	2	2
(France) A Cornet (France) C Garcia	7^{10}	4	2
7	(United States) R Kops-Jones (United States) A Spears	6^{8}	6	6

Third round
1	(Chinese Taipei) S-w Hsieh (China) S Peng	6	6^{5}	2
14	(Hungary) T Babos (France) K Mladenovic	4	7^{7}	6
11	(Russia) A Kudryavtseva (Australia) An Rodionova	7	6
7	(United States) R Kops-Jones (United States) A Spears	5	4

Quarterfinals
14	(Hungary) T Babos (France) K Mladenovic	6	3	6
11	(Russia) A Kudryavtseva (Australia) An Rodionova	3	6	4

==== Section 2 ====
First round
3	(Czech Republic) K Peschke (Slovenia) K Srebotnik	5	3
(Germany) A Petkovic (Slovakia) M Rybáriková	7	6
(Italy) F Schiavone (Spain) S Soler Espinosa	3	6	3
Q	(Australia) J Gajdošová (Australia) Ar Rodionova	6	3	6
(Austria) S Klemenschits (Romania) R Olaru	1	4
(Czech Republic) K Koukalová (Romania) M Niculescu	6	6
(United States) C McHale (Croatia) A Tomljanović	6^{4}	3
16	(Spain) G Muguruza (Spain) C Suárez Navarro	7^{7}	6
10	(Germany) J Görges (Germany) A-L Grönefeld	6	6
Q	(Serbia) V Dolonc (Chile) D Seguel	2	3
(Czech Republic) E Hrdinová (Serbia) B Jovanovski	7^{7}	6
(Slovenia) A Klepač (Spain) MT Torró Flor	6^{3}	2
(Slovakia) D Hantuchová (Croatia) M Lučić-Baroni	6	6
WC	(United Kingdom) J Konta (United Kingdom) T Moore	4	4
(Romania) I-C Begu (Italy) K Knapp	7^{10}	4	4
5	(Russia) E Makarova (Russia) E Vesnina	6^{8}	6	6

Second round
(Germany) A Petkovic (Slovakia) M Rybáriková	6	7
Q	(Australia) J Gajdošová (Australia) Ar Rodionova	2	5
(Czech Republic) K Koukalová (Romania) M Niculescu	2	6	4
16	(Spain) G Muguruza (Spain) C Suárez Navarro	6	4	6
10	(Germany) J Görges (Germany) A-L Grönefeld	6	6
(Czech Republic) E Hrdinová (Serbia) B Jovanovski	4	2
(Slovakia) D Hantuchová (Croatia) M Lučić-Baroni	w/o
5	(Russia) E Makarova (Russia) E Vesnina

Third round
(Germany) A Petkovic (Slovakia) M Rybáriková	6	7^{7}
16	(Spain) G Muguruza (Spain) C Suárez Navarro	3	6^{3}
10	(Germany) J Görges (Germany) A-L Grönefeld	6	6
5	(Russia) E Makarova (Russia) E Vesnina	3	3

Quarterfinals
(Germany) A Petkovic (Slovakia) M Rybáriková	6	7^{8}
10	(Germany) J Görges (Germany) A-L Grönefeld	1	6^{6}

=== Bottom half ===
==== Section 3 ====
First round
8	(United States) S Williams (United States) V Williams	5	6	6
(Georgia (country)) O Kalashnikova (Ukraine) O Savchuk	7	1	4
(Ukraine) I Buryachok (Ukraine) E Svitolina	0	3
(Germany) K Barrois (Switzerland) S Vögele	6	6
(Germany) A Beck (Japan) K Nara	3	2
(Russia) V Dushevina (South Africa) C Scheepers	6	6
(United States) V Lepchenko (China) S Zheng	5	5
9	(Czech Republic) A Hlaváčková (China) J Zheng	7	7
13	(Czech Republic) L Hradecká (Netherlands) M Krajicek	5	6	6
(Canada) G Dabrowski (Poland) A Rosolska	7	4	2
WC	(United Kingdom) J Rae (United Kingdom) A Smith	6	5	3
(Italy) F Pennetta (Australia) S Stosur	3	7	6
(Germany) M Barthel (Slovakia) J Husárová	2	2
(Russia) A Pavlyuchenkova (Czech Republic) L Šafářová	6	6
WC	(Switzerland) M Hingis (Russia) V Zvonareva	2	4
4	(Zimbabwe) C Black (India) S Mirza	6	6

Second round
8	(United States) S Williams (United States) V Williams	0^{r}
(Germany) K Barrois (Switzerland) S Vögele	3
(Russia) V Dushevina (South Africa) C Scheepers	4	1
9	(Czech Republic) A Hlaváčková (China) J Zheng	6	6
13	(Czech Republic) L Hradecká (Netherlands) M Krajicek	5	3
(Italy) F Pennetta (Australia) S Stosur	7	6
(Russia) A Pavlyuchenkova (Czech Republic) L Šafářová	2	7^{9}	6
4	(Zimbabwe) C Black (India) S Mirza	6	6^{7}	4

Third round
(Germany) K Barrois (Switzerland) S Vögele	5	0
9	(Czech Republic) A Hlaváčková (China) J Zheng	7	6
(Italy) F Pennetta (Australia) S Stosur	1	6^{9}
(Russia) A Pavlyuchenkova (Czech Republic) L Šafářová	6	7^{11}

Quarterfinals
9	(Czech Republic) A Hlaváčková (China) J Zheng	6	4	6
(Russia) A Pavlyuchenkova (Czech Republic) L Šafářová	1	6	3

==== Section 4 ====
First round
6	(Australia) A Barty (Australia) C Dellacqua	6	7^{7}
(Canada) E Bouchard (United Kingdom) H Watson	4	6^{3}
(Canada) S Fichman (Croatia) D Vekić	1	2
(Japan) K Date-Krumm (Czech Republic) B Záhlavová-Strýcová	6	6
Q	(France) P Parmentier (France) L Thorpe	3	6	3
(Kazakhstan) Z Diyas (Austria) P Mayr-Achleitner	6	3	6
(New Zealand) M Erakovic (Spain) A Parra Santonja	4	6	3
12	(Spain) A Medina Garrigues (Kazakhstan) Y Shvedova	6	3	6
15	(United States) L Huber (United States) L Raymond	6	7
(Austria) Y Meusburger (Poland) K Piter	0	5
(Slovakia) J Čepelová (Slovakia) AK Schmiedlová	1	6^{3}
(Japan) S Aoyama (Czech Republic) R Voráčová	6	7^{7}
Q	(Ukraine) L Kichenok (Ukraine) N Kichenok	6	7^{7}
(United States) L Davis (Puerto Rico) M Puig	2	6^{5}
(Serbia) J Janković (Russia) A Kleybanova	2	2
2	(Italy) S Errani (Italy) R Vinci	6	6

Second round
6	(Australia) A Barty (Australia) C Dellacqua	6	6
(Japan) K Date-Krumm (Czech Republic) B Záhlavová-Strýcová	4	2
(Kazakhstan) Z Diyas (Austria) P Mayr-Achleitner	0	0
12	(Spain) A Medina Garrigues (Kazakhstan) Y Shvedova	6	6
15	(United States) L Huber (United States) L Raymond	6	6^{5}	4
(Japan) S Aoyama (Czech Republic) R Voráčová	0	7^{7}	6
Q	(Ukraine) L Kichenok (Ukraine) N Kichenok	7	6^{10}	1
2	(Italy) S Errani (Italy) R Vinci	5	7^{12}	6

Third round
6	(Australia) A Barty (Australia) C Dellacqua	7^{7}	6
12	(Spain) A Medina Garrigues (Kazakhstan) Y Shvedova	6^{4}	0
(Japan) S Aoyama (Czech Republic) R Voráčová	5	3
2	(Italy) S Errani (Italy) R Vinci	7	6

Quarterfinals
6	(Australia) A Barty (Australia) C Dellacqua	4	6	0
2	(Italy) S Errani (Italy) R Vinci	6	2	6
