= 2014 Wimbledon Championships – Men's singles =

Men's singles
- 2014 Wimbledon Championships

Final
- Champion: (Serbia) Novak Djokovic
- Runner-up: (Switzerland) Roger Federer
- Score: 6–7^{(7–9)}, 6–4, 7–6^{(7–4)}, 5–7, 6–4

Details
- Draw: 128 (16Q / 5WC)
- Seeds: 32

Events
Singles	men	women		boys	girls
Doubles	men	women	mixed	boys	girls
WC Singles	men	women	quad
WC Doubles	men	women	quad
Legends	men	women	seniors
← 2013 ·	Wimbledon Championships	· 2015 →

Novak Djokovic defeated Roger Federer in the final, 6–7^{(7–9)}, 6–4, 7–6^{(7–4)}, 5–7, 6–4 to win the gentlemen's singles tennis title at the 2014 Wimbledon Championships. It was his second Wimbledon title and seventh major title overall.

Andy Murray was the defending champion, but lost to Grigor Dimitrov in the quarterfinals.

Nick Kyrgios was the first man to reach the quarterfinals on his Wimbledon debut since Florian Mayer in 2004. Defeating the world No. 1, Rafael Nadal, in the fourth round, Kyrgios was the lowest-ranked player to defeat the world No. 1 at a major since 1992 (when Andrei Olhovskiy defeated Jim Courier in Wimbledon) and the first wildcard to reach a major quarterfinal since Goran Ivanišević in 2001.

Although Nadal was the world No. 1 entering the tournament, he was seeded second behind Djokovic due to his recent poor performances on grass (specifically, his early exits at Wimbledon the previous two years). By claiming the title, Djokovic replaced Nadal as the world No. 1. The final marked the first major men's singles final since the 2009 US Open to feature neither Murray nor Nadal, a span of 18 events.

== Seeds ==
1. (Serbia) Novak Djokovic (champion)
2. (Spain) Rafael Nadal (fourth round)
3. (United Kingdom) Andy Murray (quarterfinals)
4. (Switzerland) Roger Federer (final)
5. (Switzerland) Stan Wawrinka (quarterfinals)
6. (Czech Republic) Tomáš Berdych (third round)
7. (Spain) David Ferrer (second round)
8. (Canada) Milos Raonic (semifinals)
9. (United States) John Isner (third round)
10. (Japan) Kei Nishikori (fourth round)
11. (Bulgaria) Grigor Dimitrov (semifinals)
12. (Latvia) Ernests Gulbis (second round)
13. (France) Richard Gasquet (second round)
14. (France) Jo-Wilfried Tsonga (fourth round)
15. (Poland) Jerzy Janowicz (third round)
16. (Italy) Fabio Fognini (third round)
17. (Russia) Mikhail Youzhny (second round)
18. (Spain) Fernando Verdasco (first round)
19. (Spain) Feliciano López (fourth round)
20. (South Africa) Kevin Anderson (fourth round)
21. (Ukraine) Alexandr Dolgopolov (third round)
22. (Germany) Philipp Kohlschreiber (second round)
23. (Spain) Tommy Robredo (fourth round)
24. (France) Gaël Monfils (second round)
25. (Italy) Andreas Seppi (first round)
26. (Croatia) Marin Čilić (quarterfinals)
27. (Spain) Roberto Bautista Agut (third round)
28. (Spain) Guillermo García-López (first round)
29. (Croatia) Ivo Karlović (first round)
30. (Spain) Marcel Granollers (second round)
31. (Canada) Vasek Pospisil (first round)
32. (Russia) Dmitry Tursunov (first round)

Click on the seed number of a player to go to their draw section.

== Draw ==
Key

- Q = Qualifier
- WC = Wild card
- LL = Lucky loser
- Alt = Alternate
- ITF = ITF entry
- PR = Protected ranking
- SR = Special ranking
- SE = Special exempt
- JE = Junior exempt
- JR = Junior Accelerator Programme entrant
- CO = College Accelerator Programme entrant
- NG = Next Gen Accelerator Program entrant
- w/o = Walkover
- r = Retired
- d = Defaulted

=== Finals ===
Quarterfinals
1	(Serbia) Novak Djokovic	6	3	6^{4}	6	6
26	(Croatia) Marin Čilić	1	6	7^{7}	2	2
3	(United Kingdom) Andy Murray	1	6^{4}	2
11	(Bulgaria) Grigor Dimitrov	6	7^{7}	6
5	(Switzerland) Stan Wawrinka	6	6^{5}	4	4
4	(Switzerland) Roger Federer	3	7^{7}	6	6
8	(Canada) Milos Raonic	6^{4}	6	6	7^{7}
WC	(Australia) Nick Kyrgios	7^{7}	2	4	6^{4}

Semifinals
1	(Serbia) Novak Djokovic	6	3	7^{7}	7^{9}
11	(Bulgaria) Grigor Dimitrov	4	6	6^{2}	6^{7}
4	(Switzerland) Roger Federer	6	6	6
8	(Canada) Milos Raonic	4	4	4

Final
1	(Serbia) Novak Djokovic	6^{7}	6	7^{7}	5	6
4	(Switzerland) Roger Federer	7^{9}	4	6^{4}	7	4

=== Top half ===
==== Section 1 ====
First round
1	(Serbia) N Djokovic	6	6	6
(Kazakhstan) A Golubev	0	1	4
(Czech Republic) R Štěpánek	6	6	6
PR	(Uruguay) P Cuevas	2	4	4
Q	(Russia) K Kravchuk	2	6^{4}	5
(France) G Simon	6	7^{7}	7
(Netherlands) R Haase	7^{8}	4	7	6
31	(Canada) V Pospisil	6^{6}	6	5	3
17	(Russia) M Youzhny	6	6	6
WC	(United Kingdom) J Ward	2	2	1
Q	(Chinese Taipei) J Wang	6	6	6
(Colombia) A González	3	3	2
(United States) B Klahn	7^{7}	4	1	5
(United States) S Querrey	6^{5}	6	6	7
(Austria) J Melzer	1	6	6	2	4
14	(France) J-W Tsonga	6	3	3	6	6

Second round
1	(Serbia) N Djokovic	6	6	6^{5}	7^{7}
(Czech Republic) R Štěpánek	4	3	7^{7}	6^{5}
(France) G Simon	7^{7}	6	6
(Netherlands) R Haase	6^{1}	4	4
17	(Russia) M Youzhny	6^{1}	2	7^{7}	3
Q	(Chinese Taipei) J Wang	7^{7}	6	6^{5}	6
(United States) S Querrey	6	6^{2}	7^{7}	3	12
14	(France) J-W Tsonga	4	7^{7}	6^{4}	6	14

Third round
1	(Serbia) N Djokovic	6	6	6
(France) G Simon	4	2	4
Q	(Chinese Taipei) J Wang	2	2	5
14	(France) J-W Tsonga	6	6	7

Fourth round
1	(Serbia) N Djokovic	6	6	7^{7}
14	(France) J-W Tsonga	3	4	6^{5}

==== Section 2 ====
First round
12	(Latvia) E Gulbis	7^{9}	7	7^{12}
PR	(Estonia) J Zopp	6^{7}	5	6^{10}
(Ukraine) S Stakhovsky	6	6	6
(Argentina) C Berlocq	3	3	3
(France) J Chardy	6	7^{7}	6^{6}	6
WC	(United Kingdom) D Cox	2	6^{3}	7^{8}	3
(Australia) M Matosevic	6	4	6	6
18	(Spain) F Verdasco	4	6	4	2
26	(Croatia) M Čilić	6	6^{2}	6	6
(France) P-H Mathieu	4	7^{7}	2	1
(Austria) A Haider-Maurer	6	7^{7}	6
WC	(United Kingdom) K Edmund	3	6^{4}	2
(Australia) B Tomic	6	6	6
(Russia) E Donskoy	4	3	2
(Romania) V Hănescu	7^{7}	1	4	3
6	(Czech Republic) T Berdych	6^{5}	6	6	6

Second round
12	(Latvia) E Gulbis	4	3	6^{5}
(Ukraine) S Stakhovsky	6	6	7^{7}
(France) J Chardy	6^{5}	7^{9}	7^{11}	4	7
(Australia) M Matosevic	7^{7}	6^{7}	6^{9}	6	5
26	(Croatia) M Čilić	3	6	6	6
(Austria) A Haider-Maurer	6	1	4	4
(Australia) B Tomic	6	6^{5}	6^{3}	1
6	(Czech Republic) T Berdych	4	7^{7}	7^{7}	6

Third round
(Ukraine) S Stakhovsky	3	7^{7}	3	0
(France) J Chardy	6	6^{4}	6	6
26	(Croatia) M Čilić	7^{7}	6	7^{8}
6	(Czech Republic) T Berdych	6^{5}	4	6^{6}

Fourth round
(France) J Chardy	6^{8}	4	4
26	(Croatia) M Čilić	7^{10}	6	6

==== Section 3 ====
First round
3	(United Kingdom) A Murray	6	6	7
(Belgium) D Goffin	1	4	5
(Spain) P Andújar	3	1	4
(Slovenia) B Rola	6	6	6
(Germany) T Kamke	3	7^{7}	3	7	4
Q	(Czech Republic) J Hernych	6	6^{5}	6	5	6
(United States) S Johnson	3	7^{7}	4	5
27	(Spain) R Bautista Agut	6	6^{3}	6	7
20	(South Africa) K Anderson	6	7	6
LL	(Slovenia) A Bedene	3	5	2
(Italy) F Volandri	6^{1}	2	4
(France) É Roger-Vasselin	7^{7}	6	6
(Russia) T Gabashvili	6	4	2	2
Q	(Germany) T Pütz	2	6	6	6
Q	(United States) Al Kuznetsov	6	6	4	1	7
16	(Italy) F Fognini	2	1	6	6	9

Second round
3	(United Kingdom) A Murray	6	6	6
(Slovenia) B Rola	1	1	0
Q	(Czech Republic) J Hernych	5	6	2	2
27	(Spain) R Bautista Agut	7	4	6	6
20	(South Africa) K Anderson	7^{7}	1	6	6
(France) É Roger-Vasselin	6^{0}	6	3	4
Q	(Germany) T Pütz	6	4	6^{6}	3
16	(Italy) F Fognini	2	6	7^{8}	6

Third round
3	(United Kingdom) A Murray	6	6	6
27	(Spain) R Bautista Agut	2	3	2
20	(South Africa) K Anderson	4	6	2	6	6
16	(Italy) F Fognini	6	4	6	2	1

Fourth round
3	(United Kingdom) A Murray	6	6	7^{8}
20	(South Africa) K Anderson	4	3	6^{6}

==== Section 4 ====
First round
11	(Bulgaria) G Dimitrov	7^{7}	6	6
Q	(United States) R Harrison	6^{1}	3	2
Q	(Australia) L Saville	7	6	3	6
(Austria) D Thiem	5	4	6	4
(United States) D Young	4	3	4
(Germany) B Becker	6	6	6
Q	(Australia) S Groth	5	6^{2}	6^{5}
21	(Ukraine) A Dolgopolov	7	7^{7}	7^{7}
25	(Italy) A Seppi	3	6	6	6^{5}	4
(Argentina) L Mayer	6	2	4	7^{7}	6
(Germany) D Brown	4	5	6	6^{4}
WC	(Cyprus) M Baghdatis	6	7	2	7^{7}
(Russia) An Kuznetsov	6	7	3	7^{7}
WC	(United Kingdom) D Evans	1	5	6	6^{5}
(Spain) P Carreño Busta	0	7^{7}	1	1
7	(Spain) D Ferrer	6	6^{3}	6	6

Second round
11	(Bulgaria) G Dimitrov	6	6	6
Q	(Australia) L Saville	3	2	4
(Germany) B Becker	7^{7}	6^{0}	3	4
21	(Ukraine) A Dolgopolov	6^{4}	7^{7}	6	6
(Argentina) L Mayer	7^{7}	4	6	6
WC	(Cyprus) M Baghdatis	6^{4}	6	1	4
(Russia) An Kuznetsov	6^{5}	6	3	6	6
7	(Spain) D Ferrer	7^{7}	0	6	3	2

Third round
11	(Bulgaria) G Dimitrov	6^{3}	6	2	6	6
21	(Ukraine) A Dolgopolov	7^{7}	4	6	4	1
(Argentina) L Mayer	6	7^{7}	6
(Russia) An Kuznetsov	4	6^{1}	3

Fourth round
11	(Bulgaria) G Dimitrov	6	7^{8}	6
(Argentina) L Mayer	4	6^{6}	2

=== Bottom half ===
==== Section 5 ====
First round
5	(Switzerland) S Wawrinka	6	6	6
(Portugal) J Sousa	3	4	3
(Chinese Taipei) Y-h Lu	6	4	6	1	6
(Kazakhstan) A Nedovyesov	4	6	4	6	1
(United States) M Russell	4	4	7^{7}	6	5
(Germany) J Reister	6	6	6^{5}	4	7
(Uzbekistan) D Istomin	7	6	3	6
32	(Russia) D Tursunov	5	4	6	2
19	(Spain) F López	7^{8}	7^{8}	7^{9}
Q	(Japan) Y Sugita	6^{6}	6^{6}	6^{7}
(Colombia) A Falla	4	3	5
Q	(Croatia) A Pavić	6	6	7
(Finland) J Nieminen	6	7^{7}	7
(Argentina) F Delbonis	3	6^{3}	5
WC	(United Kingdom) D Smethurst	5	3	4
9	(United States) J Isner	7	6	6

Second round
5	(Switzerland) S Wawrinka	7^{8}	6	3	7
(Chinese Taipei) Y-h Lu	6^{6}	3	6	5
(Germany) J Reister	6^{7}	4	4
(Uzbekistan) D Istomin	7^{9}	6	6
19	(Spain) F López	6	7^{7}	7
Q	(Croatia) A Pavić	4	6^{4}	5
(Finland) J Nieminen	6^{17}	6^{3}	5
9	(United States) J Isner	7^{19}	7^{7}	7

Third round
5	(Switzerland) S Wawrinka	6	6	6
(Uzbekistan) D Istomin	3	3	4
19	(Spain) F López	6^{8}	7^{8}	7^{7}	7
9	(United States) J Isner	7^{10}	6^{6}	6^{3}	5

Fourth round
5	(Switzerland) S Wawrinka	7^{7}	7^{9}	6
19	(Spain) F López	6^{5}	6^{7}	3

==== Section 6 ====
First round
15	(Poland) J Janowicz	4	6	6	3	6
(India) S Devvarman	6	3	3	6	3
(Australia) L Hewitt	6	6^{14}	6	6
(Poland) M Przysiężny	2	7^{16}	1	4
(Spain) P Riba	2	3	4
(France) A Mannarino	6	6	6
(Slovakia) L Lacko	6^{5}	6	2	4
23	(Spain) T Robredo	7^{7}	1	6	6
30	(Spain) M Granollers	6	7^{8}	6^{7}	6
(France) N Mahut	4	6^{6}	7^{9}	4
(Spain) D Gimeno Traver	1	5	0
(Colombia) S Giraldo	6	7	6
Q	(Luxembourg) G Müller	6	7^{8}	7^{7}
(France) J Benneteau	4	6^{6}	6^{5}
(Italy) P Lorenzi	1	1	3
4	(Switzerland) R Federer	6	6	6

Second round
15	(Poland) J Janowicz	7	6	6^{7}	4	6
(Australia) L Hewitt	5	4	7^{9}	6	3
(France) A Mannarino	4	1	6^{5}
23	(Spain) T Robredo	6	6	7^{7}
30	(Spain) M Granollers	6	6^{2}	6	1	5
(Colombia) S Giraldo	4	7^{7}	1	6	7
Q	(Luxembourg) G Müller	3	5	3
4	(Switzerland) R Federer	6	7	6

Third round
15	(Poland) J Janowicz	2	4	7^{7}	6	3
23	(Spain) T Robredo	6	6	6^{5}	4	6
(Colombia) S Giraldo	3	1	3
4	(Switzerland) R Federer	6	6	6

Fourth round
23	(Spain) T Robredo	1	4	4
4	(Switzerland) R Federer	6	6	6

==== Section 7 ====
First round
8	(Canada) M Raonic	6	6	6
(Australia) M Ebden	2	4	4
Q	(France) P-H Herbert	7^{7}	2	6^{5}	4
(United States) J Sock	6^{5}	6	7^{7}	6
(Poland) Ł Kubot	7^{8}	6	6
(Germany) J-L Struff	6^{6}	4	4
(Serbia) D Lajović	7^{7}	6	3	3	6
28	(Spain) G García López	6^{5}	2	6	6	3
22	(Germany) P Kohlschreiber	6	6	6
(Netherlands) I Sijsling	4	4	2
Q	(Japan) T Ito	5	6^{3}	6	6^{5}
LL	(Italy) S Bolelli	7	7^{7}	3	7^{7}
Q	(Turkey) M İlhan	6^{3}	4	6	5
Q	(United States) D Kudla	7^{7}	6	4	7
(France) K de Schepper	4	6^{5}	5
10	(Japan) K Nishikori	6	7^{7}	7

Second round
8	(Canada) M Raonic	6	6	6
(United States) J Sock	3	4	4
(Poland) Ł Kubot	6^{4}	7^{7}	6	7^{7}
(Serbia) D Lajović	7^{7}	6^{4}	3	6^{3}
22	(Germany) P Kohlschreiber	6	4	3	6	5
LL	(Italy) S Bolelli	4	6	6	2	7
Q	(United States) D Kudla	3	2	1
10	(Japan) K Nishikori	6	6	6

Third round
8	(Canada) M Raonic	7^{7}	7^{7}	6
(Poland) Ł Kubot	6^{2}	6^{4}	2
LL	(Italy) S Bolelli	6	3	6	6^{4}	4
10	(Japan) K Nishikori	3	6	4	7^{7}	6

Fourth round
8	(Canada) M Raonic	4	6	7^{7}	6
10	(Japan) K Nishikori	6	1	6^{4}	3

==== Section 8 ====
First round
13	(France) R Gasquet	6^{3}	6	3	6	6
Q	(Australia) J Duckworth	7^{7}	3	6	0	1
WC	(Australia) N Kyrgios	7^{7}	7^{7}	6^{6}	6
(France) S Robert	6^{2}	6^{1}	7^{8}	2
WC	(Czech Republic) J Veselý	5
(Dominican Republic) V Estrella Burgos	1^{r}
LL	(Tunisia) M Jaziri	6^{5}	5	4
24	(France) G Monfils	7^{7}	7	6
29	(Croatia) I Karlović	4	6^{5}	6^{4}
LL	(Canada) F Dancevic	6	7^{7}	7^{7}
(Israel) D Sela	4	4	4
(Kazakhstan) M Kukushkin	6	6	6
(France) B Paire	3	6	6^{5}	4
(Czech Republic) L Rosol	6	3	7^{7}	6
(Slovakia) M Kližan	6	3	3	3
2	(Spain) R Nadal	4	6	6	6

Second round
13	(France) R Gasquet	6	7^{7}	4	5	8
WC	(Australia) N Kyrgios	3	6^{4}	6	7	10
WC	(Czech Republic) J Veselý	7^{7}	6	6^{1}	6^{3}	6
24	(France) G Monfils	6^{3}	3	7^{7}	7^{7}	4
LL	(Canada) F Dancevic	3	3	2
(Kazakhstan) M Kukushkin	6	6	6
(Czech Republic) L Rosol	6	6^{6}	4	4
2	(Spain) R Nadal	4	7^{8}	6	6

Third round
WC	(Australia) N Kyrgios	3	6	7	6
WC	(Czech Republic) J Veselý	6	3	5	2
(Kazakhstan) M Kukushkin	7^{7}	1	1	1
2	(Spain) R Nadal	6^{4}	6	6	6

Fourth round
WC	(Australia) N Kyrgios	7^{7}	5	7^{7}	6
2	(Spain) R Nadal	6^{5}	7	6^{5}	3

Preceded by 2014 French Open – Men's singles	Grand Slam men's singles	Succeeded by 2014 US Open – Men's singles
