= Elevate your sole =

Welsh footwear retailer

Elevate your sole is a multi-channel retailer, specialising in the sale of footwear. The largest independent multi-branded footwear retailer in North Wales, operating from three stores and a 1500 sqft warehouse.

Established in 2013, the first store of this family owned business was opened in Prestatyn by proprietor Hal Holmes-Pierce. A second larger store opened in Rhos on Sea and was officially opened by the Mayor and Mayoress of Colwyn Bay on 3 September 2016. Recent expansion has seen a move into bigger premises in Prestatyn and taking over the reigns of Simon Baker Shoes in Llandudno on 1 July 2019.

== Recognition ==
Runner up in High Street Favourites in ‘Fashion, health & beauty’ (as part of High Street Heroes Awards 2016).

== Charity ==
elevate your sole was the first business in Wales to partner up with charity 'Shoe Aid’, who are engaged in reducing shoe poverty and preventing footwear going to landfill.

== Notable people ==
Hal Holmes-Pierce (proprietor) is currently Chair of Prestatyn Business Forum (as of 2 November 2020). A 'Highly Commendable Runner Up’ in the High Street Heroes Awards 2016. Also part of the Small Biz 100.

== See also ==
- Yull Shoes
