= 2014 Wimbledon Championships – Men's doubles =

Men's doubles
- 2014 Wimbledon Championships

Final
- Champions: (Canada) Vasek Pospisil (United States) Jack Sock
- Runners-up: (United States) Bob Bryan (United States) Mike Bryan
- Score: 7–6^{(7–5)}, 6–7^{(3–7)}, 6–4, 3–6, 7–5

Details
- Draw: 64 (4 Q / 5 WC )
- Seeds: 16

Events
Singles	men	women		boys	girls
Doubles	men	women	mixed	boys	girls
WC Singles	men	women	quad
WC Doubles	men	women	quad
Legends	men	women	seniors
← 2013 ·	Wimbledon Championships	· 2015 →

Vasek Pospisil and Jack Sock defeated defending champions Bob and Mike Bryan in the final, 7–6^{(7–5)}, 6–7^{(3–7)}, 6–4, 3–6, 7–5 to win the gentlemen's doubles title at the 2014 Wimbledon Championships.

== Seeds ==
1. (United States) Bob Bryan / (United States) Mike Bryan (final)
2. (Austria) Alexander Peya / (Brazil) Bruno Soares (quarterfinals)
3. (Canada) Daniel Nestor / (Serbia) Nenad Zimonjić (quarterfinals)
4. (France) Julien Benneteau / (France) Édouard Roger-Vasselin (quarterfinals)
5. (India) Leander Paes / (Czech Republic) Radek Štěpánek (semifinals)
6. (Spain) Marcel Granollers / (Spain) Marc López (third round)
7. (Poland) Łukasz Kubot / (Sweden) Robert Lindstedt (second round)
8. (India) Rohan Bopanna / (Pakistan) Aisam-ul-Haq Qureshi (second round)
9. (Austria) Julian Knowle / (Brazil) Marcelo Melo (quarterfinals)
10. (Philippines) Treat Huey / (United Kingdom) Dominic Inglot (first round)
11. (Netherlands) Jean-Julien Rojer / (Romania) Horia Tecău (third round)
12. (France) Michaël Llodra / (France) Nicolas Mahut (semifinals)
13. (United States) Eric Butorac / (South Africa) Raven Klaasen (third round)
14. (United Kingdom) Jamie Murray / (Australia) John Peers (third round)
15. (Colombia) Juan Sebastián Cabal / (Poland) Marcin Matkowski (third round)
16. (Uruguay) Pablo Cuevas / (Spain) David Marrero (third round)

Click on the seed number of a player to go to their draw section.

== Draw ==
=== Key ===
- Q = Qualifier
- WC = Wild card
- LL = Lucky loser
- Alt = Alternate
- ITF = ITF entry
- PR = Protected ranking
- SR = Special ranking
- SE = Special exempt
- JE = Junior exempt
- JR = Junior Accelerator Programme entrant
- CO = College Accelerator Programme entrant
- NG = Next Gen Accelerator Program entrant
- w/o = Walkover
- r = Retired
- d = Defaulted

=== Finals ===
Quarterfinals
1	(United States) Bob Bryan (United States) Mike Bryan	3	7^{8}	6	6
9	(Austria) Julian Knowle (Brazil) Marcelo Melo	6	6^{6}	4	4
4	(France) Julien Benneteau (France) Édouard Roger-Vasselin	4	4	7	4
12	(France) Michaël Llodra (France) Nicolas Mahut	6	6	5	6
5	(India) Leander Paes (Czech Republic) Radek Štěpánek	3	7^{7}	6	6
3	(Canada) Daniel Nestor (Serbia) Nenad Zimonjić	6	6^{5}	3	4
(Canada) Vasek Pospisil (United States) Jack Sock	6	3	7^{8}	6
2	(Austria) Alexander Peya (Brazil) Bruno Soares	4	6	6^{6}	4

Semifinals
1	(United States) Bob Bryan (United States) Mike Bryan	7^{7}	6	6
12	(France) Michaël Llodra (France) Nicolas Mahut	6^{4}	3	2
5	(India) Leander Paes (Czech Republic) Radek Štěpánek	6^{5}	3	4
(Canada) Vasek Pospisil (United States) Jack Sock	7^{7}	6	6

Final
1	(United States) Bob Bryan (United States) Mike Bryan	6^{5}	7^{7}	4	6	5
(Canada) Vasek Pospisil (United States) Jack Sock	7^{7}	6^{3}	6	3	7

=== Top half ===
==== Section 1 ====
First round
1	(United States) B Bryan (United States) M Bryan	3	7^{7}	6	6
(Australia) M Ebden (Australia) S Groth	6	6^{2}	2	2
WC	(United Kingdom) K Edmund (Ukraine) S Stakhovsky	6	4	4	4
(Spain) R Bautista Agut (Netherlands) I Sijsling	4	6	6	6
Q	(Sweden) A Siljeström (Slovakia) I Zelenay	4	5	4
(United Kingdom) J Marray (Australia) J-P Smith	6	7	6
Q	(Brazil) M Demoliner (India) P Raja	2	4	4
15	(Colombia) JS Cabal (Poland) M Matkowski	6	6	6
9	(Austria) J Knowle (Brazil) M Melo	6	7	6
(Germany) M Emmrich (Germany) C Kas	4	5	3
(Poland) T Bednarek (France) B Paire	7^{7}	6^{3}	6^{2}	2
(Kazakhstan) A Nedovyesov (Russia) D Tursunov	6^{4}	7^{7}	7^{7}	6
(Australia) C Guccione (Australia) L Hewitt	7^{7}	6	6
(Colombia) A Falla (Australia) M Matosevic	6^{5}	3	3
(Colombia) S Giraldo (Colombia) A González	2	1	4
7	(Poland) Ł Kubot (Sweden) R Lindstedt	6	6	6

Second round
1	(United States) B Bryan (United States) M Bryan	6	6	6
(Spain) R Bautista Agut (Netherlands) I Sijsling	3	4	2
(United Kingdom) J Marray (Australia) J-P Smith	6	6^{5}	4	3
15	(Colombia) JS Cabal (Poland) M Matkowski	4	7^{7}	6	6
9	(Austria) J Knowle (Brazil) M Melo	6	7^{11}	6
(Kazakhstan) A Nedovyesov (Russia) D Tursunov	1	6^{9}	3
(Australia) C Guccione (Australia) L Hewitt	7	6	6
7	(Poland) Ł Kubot (Sweden) R Lindstedt	5	3	4

Third round
1	(United States) B Bryan (United States) M Bryan	7	6	7^{7}
15	(Colombia) JS Cabal (Poland) M Matkowski	5	3	6^{5}
9	(Austria) J Knowle (Brazil) M Melo	6	6^{2}	7^{7}	6
(Australia) C Guccione (Australia) L Hewitt	3	7^{7}	6^{5}	3

Quarterfinals
1	(United States) B Bryan (United States) M Bryan	3	7^{8}	6	6
9	(Austria) J Knowle (Brazil) M Melo	6	6^{6}	4	4

==== Section 2 ====
First round
4	(France) J Benneteau (France) É Roger-Vasselin	6	6^{1}	2	6	6
(Italy) D Bracciali (Israel) J Erlich	3	7^{7}	6	3	4
(Spain) G García López (Austria) P Oswald	6	4	3	5
(Germany) A Begemann (Czech Republic) L Rosol	4	6	6	7
(Germany) B Becker (Austria) O Marach	3	3	6^{7}
PR	(Czech Republic) J Levinský (Czech Republic) J Veselý	6	6	7^{9}
Q	(United States) R Harrison (United States) K King	4	6	1	4
13	(United States) E Butorac (South Africa) R Klaasen	6	3	6	6
12	(France) M Llodra (France) N Mahut	6	6	6
(Argentina) F Delbonis (Argentina) L Mayer	3	3	3
WC	(United Kingdom) E Corrie (United Kingdom) D Smethurst	4	6^{4}	6^{2}
(Sweden) J Brunström (Denmark) F Nielsen	6	7^{7}	7^{7}
(United States) N Monroe (Germany) S Stadler	2	3	1
(Italy) S Bolelli (Italy) F Fognini	6	6	6
(Croatia) M Draganja (Romania) F Mergea	7^{7}	1	2	6	1
6	(Spain) M Granollers (Spain) M López	6^{4}	6	6	3	6

Second round
4	(France) J Benneteau (France) É Roger-Vasselin	6	6^{3}	6	6
(Germany) A Begemann (Czech Republic) L Rosol	3	7^{7}	4	2
PR	(Czech Republic) J Levinský (Czech Republic) J Veselý	3	7^{7}	6^{5}	4
13	(United States) E Butorac (South Africa) R Klaasen	6	6^{5}	7^{7}	6
12	(France) M Llodra (France) N Mahut	6	6	6
(Sweden) J Brunström (Denmark) F Nielsen	3	4	2
(Italy) S Bolelli (Italy) F Fognini	2	5	6	6	3
6	(Spain) M Granollers (Spain) M López	6	7	2	1	6

Third round
4	(France) J Benneteau (France) É Roger-Vasselin	6^{3}	6	7^{7}	6
13	(United States) E Butorac (South Africa) R Klaasen	7^{7}	2	6^{4}	3
12	(France) M Llodra (France) N Mahut	7^{7}	7	7
6	(Spain) M Granollers (Spain) M López	6^{2}	5	5

Quarterfinals
4	(France) J Benneteau (France) É Roger-Vasselin	4	4	7	4
12	(France) M Llodra (France) N Mahut	6	6	5	6

=== Bottom half ===
==== Section 3 ====
First round
5	(India) L Paes (Czech Republic) R Štěpánek	6	7^{7}	3	6
(Poland) M Fyrstenberg (United States) R Ram	2	6^{4}	6	4
(Mexico) S González (United States) S Lipsky	7^{9}	6	3	7^{7}
(Czech Republic) L Dlouhý (Australia) P Hanley	6^{7}	0	6	6^{3}
(Spain) F López (Austria) J Melzer	7	3	6	6
Q	(Australia) A Bolt (Australia) A Whittington	5	6	3	2
(Finland) H Kontinen (Finland) J Nieminen	6^{5}	4	6^{4}
11	(Netherlands) J-J Rojer (Romania) H Tecău	7^{7}	6	7^{7}
16	(Uruguay) P Cuevas (Spain) D Marrero	6	4	6	7^{7}
WC	(United Kingdom) C Fleming (United Kingdom) R Hutchins	3	6	3	6^{2}
(United States) B Klahn (New Zealand) M Venus	5	6^{5}	6	0
(United States) A Krajicek (United States) D Young	7	7^{7}	4	6
(United Kingdom) K Skupski (United Kingdom) N Skupski	7	3	4	2
(Germany) D Brown (Germany) J-L Struff	5	6	6	6
(Italy) P Lorenzi (Italy) A Seppi	6^{5}	3	4
3	(Canada) D Nestor (Serbia) N Zimonjić	7^{7}	6	6

Second round
5	(India) L Paes (Czech Republic) R Štěpánek	3	6	3	6	11
(Mexico) S González (United States) S Lipsky	6	1	6	3	9
(Spain) F López (Austria) J Melzer	6^{3}	3	6^{8}
11	(Netherlands) J-J Rojer (Romania) H Tecău	7^{7}	6	7^{10}
16	(Uruguay) P Cuevas (Spain) D Marrero	6	6^{4}	7	7
(United States) A Krajicek (United States) D Young	4	7^{7}	5	5
(Germany) D Brown (Germany) J-L Struff	4	6	4	2
3	(Canada) D Nestor (Serbia) N Zimonjić	6	3	6	6

Third round
5	(India) L Paes (Czech Republic) R Štěpánek	6	6^{5}	6	7
11	(Netherlands) J-J Rojer (Romania) H Tecău	4	7^{7}	4	5
16	(Uruguay) P Cuevas (Spain) D Marrero	6^{8}	4	4
3	(Canada) D Nestor (Serbia) N Zimonjić	7^{10}	6	6

Quarterfinals
5	(India) L Paes (Czech Republic) R Štěpánek	3	7^{7}	6	6
3	(Canada) D Nestor (Serbia) N Zimonjić	6	6^{5}	3	4

==== Section 4 ====
First round
8	(India) R Bopanna (Pakistan) A-u-H Qureshi	7^{11}	7^{10}	6
(Czech Republic) F Čermák (Russia) M Elgin	6^{9}	6^{8}	3
(Canada) V Pospisil (United States) J Sock	6	6	6
(Netherlands) R Haase (Netherlands) J Huta Galung	3	2	2
(Kazakhstan) A Golubev (Uzbekistan) D Istomin	6^{6}	4	6	6^{6}
(Russia) T Gabashvili (Kazakhstan) M Kukushkin	7^{8}	6	4	7^{8}
(Croatia) M Pavić (Brazil) A Sá	6	7^{7}	6
10	(Philippines) T Huey (United Kingdom) D Inglot	4	6^{5}	3
14	(United Kingdom) J Murray (Australia) J Peers	6	6	6
WC	(United Kingdom) D Evans (United Kingdom) J Ward	2	4	4
(Chinese Taipei) Y-h Lu (India) D Sharan	6	6	6^{3}	3	2
WC	(United Kingdom) J Delgado (Luxembourg) G Müller	2	2	7^{7}	6	6
(Slovakia) M Kližan (Austria) D Thiem	7	5	6	5	8
(Argentina) C Berlocq (Portugal) J Sousa	5	7	4	7	6
(Belarus) M Mirnyi (Russia) M Youzhny	6	3	6	3	2
2	(Austria) A Peya (Brazil) B Soares	4	6	3	6	6

Second round
8	(India) R Bopanna (Pakistan) A-u-H Qureshi	7^{7}	6^{5}	3	6	5
(Canada) V Pospisil (United States) J Sock	6^{3}	7^{7}	6	4	7
(Russia) T Gabashvili (Kazakhstan) M Kukushkin	6	6^{6}	4	4
(Croatia) M Pavić (Brazil) A Sá	3	7^{8}	6	6
14	(United Kingdom) J Murray (Australia) J Peers	6	7^{9}	6
WC	(United Kingdom) J Delgado (Luxembourg) G Müller	3	6^{7}	3
(Slovakia) M Kližan (Austria) D Thiem	6^{5}	4	2
2	(Austria) A Peya (Brazil) B Soares	7^{7}	6	6

Third round
(Canada) V Pospisil (United States) J Sock	7^{7}	7^{7}	6
(Croatia) M Pavić (Brazil) A Sá	6^{3}	6^{3}	4
14	(United Kingdom) J Murray (Australia) J Peers	3	7^{7}	6^{3}	6	3
2	(Austria) A Peya (Brazil) B Soares	6	6^{2}	7^{7}	3	6

Quarterfinals
(Canada) V Pospisil (United States) J Sock	6	3	7^{8}	6
2	(Austria) A Peya (Brazil) B Soares	4	6	6^{6}	4
