= Folli Follie =

Greek jewelry company

- Trade name: Folli Follie Group
- Type: S.A
- Traded as: Athex: FFGRP
- Industry: Luxury goods manufacture and retail
- Founded: 1982
- Headquarters: Athens, Greece
- Key people: George Koutsolioutsos (CEO); Dimitris Koutsolioutsos (Chairman)
- Products: Jewelry
- Services: sporting goods apparel retail and distribution
- Revenue: €1.337 billion (2016)
- Operating income: €262.27 million (2016)
- Net income: €226.91 million (2016)
- Total assets: €2.580 billion (2016)
- Total equity: €1.884 billion (2016)
- Owner: Dimitris Koutsolioutsos (35.1%); Fosun International (13.9%)
- Number of employees: 5,079 (2016)
- Website: www.follifollie.com

Folli Follie (FF) is a Greek-based international company which designs, manufactures and distributes luxury jewellery, watches and fashion accessories.

== History ==
The company was established in 1982 in Greece by Dimitris Koutsolioutsos (Greek: Δημήτρης Κουτσολιούτσος). The first shop was in the commercial district of Athens. In 1995, the first overseas store opened, in Japan. It is now ranked amongst the top 10 brands in luxury goods in Japan with 80 points of sale. Folli Follie fully acquired its affiliate in Japan in 2008.

In 1997, Folli Follie was listed on the Athens Stock Exchange. Capital was used to fund growth and geographic expansion. Folli Follie is currently active in 25 countries, including the UK (London; Bond Street, New Bond Street, Cardiff & Glasgow; St Enoch Centre), Switzerland (Geneva), Japan (Tokyo; Ginza area), France (Paris), the US (New York; Madison Avenue), Taiwan (22 shops), China (more than 120 shops) and Russia (Moscow; Red Square); it has over 380 points of sale.

== Design ==
The company's design team consists of Italian, Swiss and Greek top designers who work together to present two collections per year: Autumn/Winter and Spring/Summer. The collection's highlight is the "Premium K" collection which includes limited edition jewellery and accessory pieces. Folli Follie's philosophy is to offer a "full fashion concept" of branded, modern jewellery, watches and accessories at affordable prices.

== Acquisitions ==
Hellenic acquired the British jewellery company Links of London in 2006, with an enterprise value of £45 million. In 2019, it went into administration and closed down all of its 28 stores.

== Stores ==
The Folli Follie stores were allegedly 518 in 2017 (though this is disputed according to the report of Quintessential Capital Management). In 2022, there were 95 stores and stockists combined.

== Market manipulation fraud ==
On May 4, 2018 Quintessential Capital Management made the fact-based allegation that "The image we received from reviewing Folli Follie’s (OTCPK:FLLIY) financial statements and official declarations over the year is that of a rapidly-growing multinational fashion company led by double-digit growth in its key segment: Asia. Unfortunately, following an extensive investigative and due diligence work, we find it impossible to reconcile that picture with our findings on the ground, which point to an unprofitable, struggling company with materially smaller and rapidly decreasing revenue, network size, and cash balances. The core of the issue seems to be concentrated in FF’s Asian and, particularly, Chinese subsidiaries."

Following the announcement the FF share price in the Greek stock market tumbled and after a few weeks trading was suspended.

Finally, on August 16, 2018, a credit event occurred with one of FF's bonds, giving a strong indication that Quintessential's allegations are valid.

Events unfolded rapidly with Folli Follie Chairman and his wife (both cofounders of the company) quitting the business on September 27. Their son however remained as CEO claiming that his father has all the responsibility for the company's Asian branch misrepresentation of financial figures. Important shareholders like Fosun and Dufry demanded that Mr. Koutsolioutsos resigns his post as also did the union of employees who have appealed for the Greek courts help in order to place the company under a protective status vs its creditors.

During 2019, courts repeatedly refused to halt repossession of collateral and real property by the creditors. Negotiations with strategic investors have reached a deadlock due to the company being unable to obtain protection from creditors. Audited accounts for 2018 have not been produced, and accounts for 2017 are likewise suspended. According to the Greek newspaper Kathimerini, the auditing firm PwC has refused to certify the accounts for 2017, and attached a list of reservations as the reason, among them the discovery of previously undisclosed loans in excess of 100 million euros to an affiliated asian company, without collateral or even interest payments.
