= 2014 Wimbledon Championships – Women's singles =

Women's singles
- 2014 Wimbledon Championships

Final
- Champion: (Czech Republic) Petra Kvitová
- Runner-up: (Canada) Eugenie Bouchard
- Score: 6–3, 6–0

Details
- Draw: 128 (12Q / 8WC)
- Seeds: 32

Events
Singles	men	women		boys	girls
Doubles	men	women	mixed	boys	girls
WC Singles	men	women	quad
WC Doubles	men	women	quad
Legends	men	women	seniors
- Wimbledon Championships

Petra Kvitová defeated Eugenie Bouchard in the final, 6–3, 6–0 to win the ladies' singles tennis title at the 2014 Wimbledon Championships. It was her second Wimbledon title and second and last major title overall.

Marion Bartoli was the reigning champion, but she retired from professional tennis in August 2013.

Like at that year's French Open, the tournament was marked by two significant upsets. The top two seeds – Serena Williams and Li Na – both lost in the third round. This marked the first time in the Open Era that neither of the top two seeds at Wimbledon reached the fourth round. Five-time Wimbledon champion Williams' defeat equalled her earliest exit from the tournament (she lost at the same stage in 1998 and 2005). Two-time major champion Li fell to unseeded Barbora Záhlavová-Strýcová, in what would be her final professional tennis match; she announced her retirement from the sport three months later.

== The final ==
Sixth-seeded Kvitová defeated her compatriot and 23rd-seeded Lucie Šafářová, 7–6^{(8–6)}, 6–1 in the first semifinal, while 13th-seeded Eugenie Bouchard defeated third-seeded Simona Halep, 7–6^{(7–5)}, 6–2 in the other. Bouchard, playing in only her sixth grand slam tournament, advanced to the final without losing a set, becoming the first Canadian tennis player to reach the singles final of a grand slam. The title match was the first grand slam final contested between two players born in the 1990s. In the first set, Kvitová broke in the third game and broke again in the seventh to establish a 5–2 lead. With Kvitová serving for the set, Bouchard broke back, but Kvitová did the same in the following game to take the first set 6–3. The second set saw Kvitová lose only three points on serve as she bagelled Bouchard 6–0. Only 10 other Wimbledon women singles champions lost "fewer games in the final than Kvitova did".

The victory gave Kvitová her second Wimbledon title and second Grand Slam title overall. After the tournament, Bouchard improved to a career-high World No. 7 in the WTA rankings, surpassing Carling Bassett-Seguso's record of being the highest-ranked Canadian woman of all-time, while Kvitová moved up to World No. 4.

== Seeds ==
1. (United States) Serena Williams (third round)
2. (China) Li Na (third round)
3. (Romania) Simona Halep (semifinals)
4. (Poland) Agnieszka Radwańska (fourth round)
5. (Russia) Maria Sharapova (fourth round)
6. (Czech Republic) Petra Kvitová (champion)
7. (Serbia) Jelena Janković (first round)
8. (Belarus) Victoria Azarenka (second round)
9. (Germany) Angelique Kerber (quarterfinals)
10. (Slovakia) Dominika Cibulková (third round)
11. (Serbia) Ana Ivanovic (third round)
12. (Italy) Flavia Pennetta (second round)
13. (Canada) Eugenie Bouchard (final)
14. (Italy) Sara Errani (first round)
15. (Spain) Carla Suárez Navarro (second round)
16. (Denmark) Caroline Wozniacki (fourth round)

17. (Australia) Samantha Stosur (first round)
18. (United States) Sloane Stephens (first round)
19. (Germany) Sabine Lisicki (quarterfinals)
20. (Germany) Andrea Petkovic (third round)
21. (Italy) Roberta Vinci (first round)
22. (Russia) Ekaterina Makarova (quarterfinals)
23. (Czech Republic) Lucie Šafářová (semifinals)
24. (Belgium) Kirsten Flipkens (third round)
25. (France) Alizé Cornet (fourth round)
26. (Russia) Anastasia Pavlyuchenkova (first round)
27. (Spain) Garbiñe Muguruza (first round)
28. (Russia) Svetlana Kuznetsova (first round)
29. (Romania) Sorana Cîrstea (first round)
30. (United States) Venus Williams (third round)
31. (Czech Republic) Klára Koukalová (second round)
32. (Russia) Elena Vesnina (second round)

Click on the seed number of a player to go to their draw section.

== Draw ==
Key

- Q = Qualifier
- WC = Wild card
- LL = Lucky loser
- Alt = Alternate
- ITF = ITF entry
- PR = Protected ranking
- SR = Special ranking
- SE = Special exempt
- JE = Junior exempt
- JR = Junior Accelerator Programme entrant
- CO = College Accelerator Programme entrant
- NG = Next Gen Accelerator Program entrant
- w/o = Walkover
- r = Retired
- d = Defaulted

=== Finals ===
Quarterfinals
13	(Canada) Eugenie Bouchard	6	6
9	(Germany) Angelique Kerber	3	4
3	(Romania) Simona Halep	6	6
19	(Germany) Sabine Lisicki	4	0
23	(Czech Republic) Lucie Šafářová	6	6
22	(Russia) Ekaterina Makarova	3	1
6	(Czech Republic) Petra Kvitová	6	7
(Czech Republic) Barbora Záhlavová-Strýcová	1	5

Semifinals
13	(Canada) Eugenie Bouchard	7^{7}	6
3	(Romania) Simona Halep	6^{5}	2
23	(Czech Republic) Lucie Šafářová	6^{6}	1
6	(Czech Republic) Petra Kvitová	7^{8}	6

Final
13	(Canada) Eugenie Bouchard	3	0
6	(Czech Republic) Petra Kvitová	6	6

=== Top half ===
==== Section 1 ====
First round
1	(United States) S Williams	6	6
(United States) A Tatishvili	1	2
(South Africa) C Scheepers	6	6
(United States) C McHale	3	3
(Serbia) J Jakšić	2	6	5
(Czech Republic) P Cetkovská	6	4	7
(Slovakia) AK Schmiedlová	6	4	2
25	(France) A Cornet	4	6	6
20	(Germany) A Petkovic	6	6
(Poland) K Piter	1	4
(Romania) I-C Begu	1	6	7
(France) V Razzano	6	4	5
WC	(Spain) S Soler Espinosa	6	6
(Belarus) O Govortsova	2	3
(Slovakia) D Hantuchová	5	5
13	(Canada) E Bouchard	7	7

Second round
1	(United States) S Williams	6	6
(South Africa) C Scheepers	1	1
(Czech Republic) P Cetkovská	4	7	3
25	(France) A Cornet	6	5	6
20	(Germany) A Petkovic	6	3	6
(Romania) I-C Begu	4	6	1
WC	(Spain) S Soler Espinosa	5	1
13	(Canada) E Bouchard	7	6

Third round
1	(United States) S Williams	6	3	4
25	(France) A Cornet	1	6	6
20	(Germany) A Petkovic	3	4
13	(Canada) E Bouchard	6	6

Fourth round
25	(France) A Cornet	6^{5}	5
13	(Canada) E Bouchard	7^{7}	7

==== Section 2 ====
First round
9	(Germany) A Kerber	6	6
(Poland) U Radwańska	2	4
(United Kingdom) H Watson	6	6
(Croatia) A Tomljanović	3	2
(Croatia) P Martić	0	1
(Spain) L Domínguez Lino	6	6
Q	(Austria) T Paszek	4	7^{7}	2
24	(Belgium) K Flipkens	6	6^{3}	6
26	(Russia) A Pavlyuchenkova	6	5	1
(United States) A Riske	4	7	6
(Romania) A Cadanțu	1	6^{5}
(Italy) C Giorgi	6	7^{7}
Q	(Switzerland) T Bacsinszky	6	6
(Canada) S Fichman	1	3
WC	(United Kingdom) S Murray	1	0
5	(Russia) M Sharapova	6	6

Second round
9	(Germany) A Kerber	6	5	6
(United Kingdom) H Watson	2	7	1
(Spain) L Domínguez Lino	2	1
24	(Belgium) K Flipkens	6	6
(United States) A Riske	7	6
(Italy) C Giorgi	5	2
Q	(Switzerland) T Bacsinszky	2	1
5	(Russia) M Sharapova	6	6

Third round
9	(Germany) A Kerber	3	6	6
24	(Belgium) K Flipkens	6	3	2
(United States) A Riske	3	0
5	(Russia) M Sharapova	6	6

Fourth round
9	(Germany) A Kerber	7^{7}	4	6
5	(Russia) M Sharapova	6^{4}	6	4

==== Section 3 ====
First round
3	(Romania) S Halep	6	6
(Brazil) T Pereira	2	2
(Germany) D Pfizenmaier	3	0
Q	(Ukraine) L Tsurenko	6	6
(Switzerland) B Bencic	2	6	6
(Slovakia) M Rybáriková	6	3	3
Q	(United States) V Duval	6	3	6
29	(Romania) S Cîrstea	4	6	1
21	(Italy) R Vinci	4	6	4
(Croatia) D Vekić	6	4	6
WC	(Russia) V Zvonareva	6	6^{3}	9
WC	(United Kingdom) T Moore	4	7^{7}	7
(Kazakhstan) Z Diyas	7^{7}	6
(France) K Mladenovic	6^{4}	4
(China) S Zhang	1	2
15	(Spain) C Suárez Navarro	6	6

Second round
3	(Romania) S Halep	6	4	6
Q	(Ukraine) L Tsurenko	3	6	4
(Switzerland) B Bencic	6	7
Q	(United States) V Duval	4	5
(Croatia) D Vekić	4	4
WC	(Russia) V Zvonareva	6	6
(Kazakhstan) Z Diyas	7^{14}	5	6
15	(Spain) C Suárez Navarro	6^{12}	7	2

Third round
3	(Romania) S Halep	6	6
(Switzerland) B Bencic	4	1
WC	(Russia) V Zvonareva	6^{1}	6	3
(Kazakhstan) Z Diyas	7^{7}	3	6

Fourth round
3	(Romania) S Halep	6	6
(Kazakhstan) Z Diyas	3	0

==== Section 4 ====
First round
11	(Serbia) A Ivanovic	7^{8}	6
(Italy) F Schiavone	6^{6}	4
(Germany) A Beck	1	3
(China) J Zheng	6	6
(Czech Republic) Ka Plíšková	6^{4}	6	10
(Italy) K Knapp	7^{7}	4	8
(Israel) J Glushko	2	1
19	(Germany) S Lisicki	6	6
31	(Czech Republic) K Koukalová	7	6
WC	(United States) T Townsend	5	2
(United States) M Keys	6	6
(Puerto Rico) M Puig	3	3
WC	(Czech Republic) Kr Plíšková	6	4	6
(Kazakhstan) Y Shvedova	3	6	8
(Estonia) K Kanepi	6	6
7	(Serbia) J Janković	3	2

Second round
11	(Serbia) A Ivanovic	6	6
(China) J Zheng	4	0
(Czech Republic) Ka Plíšková	3	5
19	(Germany) S Lisicki	6	7
31	(Czech Republic) K Koukalová	5	7^{7}	2
(United States) M Keys	7	6^{3}	6
(Kazakhstan) Y Shvedova	6	6^{4}	6
(Estonia) K Kanepi	3	7^{7}	2

Third round
11	(Serbia) A Ivanovic	4	6	1
19	(Germany) S Lisicki	6	3	6
(United States) M Keys	6^{7}	6^{r}
(Kazakhstan) Y Shvedova	7^{9}	6

Fourth round
19	(Germany) S Lisicki	6	3	6
(Kazakhstan) Y Shvedova	3	6	4

=== Bottom half ===
==== Section 5 ====
First round
8	(Belarus) V Azarenka	6	7
(Croatia) M Lučić-Baroni	3	5
(Sweden) J Larsson	6^{2}	0
(Serbia) B Jovanovski	7^{7}	6
Q	(Czech Republic) T Smitková	6	6
(Chinese Taipei) S-w Hsieh	3	3
(United States) C Vandeweghe	6	3	7
27	(Spain) G Muguruza	3	6	5
23	(Czech Republic) L Šafářová	7^{7}	7^{7}
(Germany) J Görges	6^{3}	6^{3}
(Slovenia) P Hercog	6	6
(Argentina) P Ormaechea	4	4
(Romania) M Niculescu	5	3
(Belgium) A Van Uytvanck	7	6
Q	(Canada) A Wozniak	1	2
10	(Slovakia) D Cibulková	6	6

Second round
8	(Belarus) V Azarenka	3	6	5
(Serbia) B Jovanovski	6	3	7
Q	(Czech Republic) T Smitková	6	7^{7}
(United States) C Vandeweghe	3	6^{4}
23	(Czech Republic) L Šafářová	7^{9}	7
(Slovenia) P Hercog	6^{7}	5
(Belgium) A Van Uytvanck	6	3	6
10	(Slovakia) D Cibulková	3	6	8

Third round
(Serbia) B Jovanovski	6	6^{5}	8
Q	(Czech Republic) T Smitková	4	7^{7}	10
23	(Czech Republic) L Šafářová	6	6
10	(Slovakia) D Cibulková	4	2

Fourth round
Q	(Czech Republic) T Smitková	0	2
23	(Czech Republic) L Šafářová	6	6

==== Section 6 ====
First round
14	(Italy) S Errani	6	6^{3}	5
(France) C Garcia	2	7^{7}	7
(Bulgaria) T Pironkova	7^{8}	2	2
(United States) V Lepchenko	6^{6}	6	6
(Japan) M Doi	6	6
(Ukraine) E Svitolina	4	1
(Japan) K Date-Krumm	6	4	5
22	(Russia) E Makarova	3	6	7
28	(Russia) S Kuznetsova	6	3	1
Q	(Portugal) M Larcher de Brito	3	6	6
(Switzerland) S Vögele	3	6^{6}
WC	(Australia) J Gajdošová	6	7^{8}
Q	(Estonia) A Kontaveit	6	6^{4}	3
(Australia) C Dellacqua	3	7^{7}	6
Q	(Romania) A Mitu	2	1
4	(Poland) A Radwańska	6	6

Second round
(France) C Garcia	7	6
(United States) V Lepchenko	5	3
(Japan) M Doi	5	4
22	(Russia) E Makarova	7	6
Q	(Portugal) M Larcher de Brito	6	4	6
WC	(Australia) J Gajdošová	3	6	3
(Australia) C Dellacqua	4	0
4	(Poland) A Radwańska	6	6

Third round
(France) C Garcia	5	3
22	(Russia) E Makarova	7	6
Q	(Portugal) M Larcher de Brito	2	0
4	(Poland) A Radwańska	6	6

Fourth round
22	(Russia) E Makarova	6	6
4	(Poland) A Radwańska	3	0

==== Section 7 ====
First round
6	(Czech Republic) P Kvitová	6	6
(Czech Republic) A Hlaváčková	3	0
(Germany) M Barthel	7	6
(Switzerland) R Oprandi	5	0
(Japan) K Nara	6	6
(Germany) A-L Friedsam	4	4
(Spain) MT Torró Flor	4	6	2
30	(United States) V Williams	6	4	6
18	(United States) S Stephens	2	6^{6}
(Russia) M Kirilenko	6	7^{8}
(United Kingdom) J Konta	4	6	4
(China) S Peng	6	3	6
(United States) L Davis	6	6
(Russia) A Kleybanova	1	2
(Slovakia) J Čepelová	2	3
12	(Italy) F Pennetta	6	6

Second round
6	(Czech Republic) P Kvitová	6	6
(Germany) M Barthel	2	0
(Japan) K Nara	6^{4}	1
30	(United States) V Williams	7^{7}	6
(Russia) M Kirilenko	0	3
(China) S Peng	6	6
(United States) L Davis	6	7^{7}
12	(Italy) F Pennetta	4	6^{4}

Third round
6	(Czech Republic) P Kvitová	5	7^{7}	7
30	(United States) V Williams	7	6^{2}	5
(China) S Peng	0	6	6
(United States) L Davis	6	3	3

Fourth round
6	(Czech Republic) P Kvitová	6	6
(China) S Peng	3	2

==== Section 8 ====
First round
16	(Denmark) C Wozniacki	6	6
(Israel) S Pe'er	3	0
WC	(United Kingdom) N Broady	2	7^{9}	6
(Hungary) T Babos	6	6^{7}	0
Q	(Croatia) A Konjuh	6	4	6
(New Zealand) M Erakovic	3	6	0
(Belgium) Y Wickmayer	6	6
17	(Australia) S Stosur	3	4
32	(Russia) E Vesnina	6	6
(Austria) P Mayr-Achleitner	0	4
Q	(Russia) A Kudryavtseva	2	2
(Czech Republic) B Záhlavová-Strýcová	6	6
(United States) V King	5	3
(Austria) Y Meusburger	7	6
Q	(Poland) P Kania	5	2
2	(China) N Li	7	6

Second round
16	(Denmark) C Wozniacki	6	6
WC	(United Kingdom) N Broady	3	2
Q	(Croatia) A Konjuh	3	6	6
(Belgium) Y Wickmayer	6	2	2
32	(Russia) E Vesnina	4	2
(Czech Republic) B Záhlavová-Strýcová	6	6
(Austria) Y Meusburger	2	2
2	(China) N Li	6	6

Third round
16	(Denmark) C Wozniacki	6	6
Q	(Croatia) A Konjuh	3	0
(Czech Republic) B Záhlavová-Strýcová	7^{7}	7^{7}
2	(China) N Li	6^{5}	6^{5}

Fourth round
16	(Denmark) C Wozniacki	2	5
(Czech Republic) B Záhlavová-Strýcová	6	7

== Championship match statistics ==
Category	(Czech Republic) Kvitová	(Canada) Bouchard
1st serve %	28/41 (68%)	35/57 (61%)
1st serve points won	23 of 28 = 82%	16 of 35 = 46%
2nd serve points won	5 of 13 = 38%	8 of 22 = 36%
Total service points won	28 of 41 = 68.29%	24 of 57 = 42.11%
Aces	4	1
Double faults	3	2
Winners	22	7
Unforced errors	7	6
Net points won	7 of 9 = 78%	0 of 1 = 0%
Break points converted	6 of 13 = 46%	1 of 1 = 100%
Return points won	33 of 57 = 58%	13 of 41 = 32%
Total points won	61	37

Preceded by 2014 French Open – Women's singles	Grand Slam women's singles	Succeeded by 2014 US Open – Women's singles
