= 2014 Wimbledon Championships – Men's doubles qualifying =

Men's doubles qualifying
- 2014 Wimbledon Championships

Events
Singles	men	women		boys	girls
Doubles	men	women	mixed	boys	girls
WC Singles	men	women	quad
WC Doubles	men	women	quad
Legends	men	women	seniors

Qualification
Singles	men	women
Doubles	men	women
- Wimbledon Championships

Players and pairs who neither have high enough rankings nor receive wild cards may participate in a qualifying tournament held one week before the annual Wimbledon Tennis Championships.

== Seeds ==
1. (Germany) Gero Kretschmer / (Germany) Alexander Satschko (qualifying competition)
2. (Thailand) Sanchai Ratiwatana / (Thailand) Sonchat Ratiwatana (first round)
3. (Australia) Rameez Junaid / (Germany) Philipp Marx (first round)
4. (Australia) Alex Bolt / (Australia) Andrew Whittington (qualified)
5. (Brazil) Marcelo Demoliner / (India) Purav Raja (qualified)
6. (Poland) Mateusz Kowalczyk / (New Zealand) Artem Sitak (first round)
7. (France) Pierre-Hugues Herbert / (Canada) Adil Shamasdin (first round)
8. (Russia) Konstantin Kravchuk / (Germany) Tim Pütz (qualifying competition)

== Qualifiers ==
1. (Brazil) Marcelo Demoliner / (India) Purav Raja
2. (Sweden) Andreas Siljeström / (Slovakia) Igor Zelenay
3. (United States) Ryan Harrison / (United States) Kevin King
4. (Australia) Alex Bolt / (Australia) Andrew Whittington

== Qualifying draw ==
=== First qualifier ===
First round
1	(Germany) Gero Kretschmer (Germany) Alexander Satschko	6^{5}	6	6
(Bosnia and Herzegovina) Damir Džumhur (Croatia) Franko Škugor	7^{7}	2	2
(India) Somdev Devvarman (Russia) Evgeny Donskoy	5	5
5	(Brazil) Marcelo Demoliner (India) Purav Raja	7	7

Qualifying competition
1	(Germany) Gero Kretschmer (Germany) Alexander Satschko	6	1	4
5	(Brazil) Marcelo Demoliner (India) Purav Raja	4	6	6

=== Second qualifier ===
First round
2	(Thailand) Sanchai Ratiwatana (Thailand) Sonchat Ratiwatana	6	6^{5}	7
(United States) Denis Kudla (United States) Tim Smyczek	4	7^{7}	9
(Sweden) Andreas Siljeström (Slovakia) Igor Zelenay	6	4	6
6	(Poland) Mateusz Kowalczyk (New Zealand) Artem Sitak	3	6	4

Qualifying competition
(United States) Denis Kudla (United States) Tim Smyczek	4	4
(Sweden) Andreas Siljeström (Slovakia) Igor Zelenay	6	6

=== Third qualifier ===
First round
3	(Australia) Rameez Junaid (Germany) Philipp Marx	7	4	4
(United States) Ryan Harrison (United States) Kevin King	5	6	6
WC	(United Kingdom) Lewis Burton (United Kingdom) Marcus Willis	6^{10}	6^{6}
8	(Russia) Konstantin Kravchuk (Germany) Tim Pütz	7^{12}	7^{8}

Qualifying competition
(United States) Ryan Harrison (United States) Kevin King	6	7
8	(Russia) Konstantin Kravchuk (Germany) Tim Pütz	3	5

=== Fourth qualifier ===
First round
4	(Australia) Alex Bolt (Australia) Andrew Whittington	7^{7}	7^{7}
(Germany) Dominik Meffert (Japan) Go Soeda	6^{4}	6^{3}
WC	(United Kingdom) David Rice (United Kingdom) Sean Thornley	7^{7}	6
7	(France) Pierre-Hugues Herbert (Canada) Adil Shamasdin	6^{4}	3

Qualifying competition
4	(Australia) Alex Bolt (Australia) Andrew Whittington	6	6
WC	(United Kingdom) David Rice (United Kingdom) Sean Thornley	3	2
