= 2014 Wimbledon Championships – Women's singles qualifying =

Women's singles qualifying
- 2014 Wimbledon Championships

Events
Singles	men	women		boys	girls
Doubles	men	women	mixed	boys	girls
WC Singles	men	women	quad
WC Doubles	men	women	quad
Legends	men	women	seniors

Qualification
Singles	men	women
Doubles	men	women
- Wimbledon Championships

Players and pairs who neither have high enough rankings nor receive wild cards may participate in a qualifying tournament held one week before the annual Wimbledon Tennis Championships.

== Seeds ==
1. (Netherlands) Kiki Bertens (first round)
2. (France) Pauline Parmentier (first round)
3. (Switzerland) Timea Bacsinszky (qualified)
4. (Portugal) Michelle Larcher de Brito (qualified)
5. (Romania) Alexandra Dulgheru (second round)
6. (Montenegro) Danka Kovinić (qualifying competition)
7. (France) Claire Feuerstein (second round)
8. (Serbia) Vesna Dolonc (first round)
9. (Ukraine) Nadiia Kichenok (first round)
10. (Spain) Lara Arruabarrena (first round)
11. (China) Zheng Saisai (first round)
12. (Thailand) Luksika Kumkhum (second round)
13. (Poland) Magda Linette (first round)
14. (Spain) Estrella Cabeza Candela (first round)
15. (United States) Victoria Duval (qualified)
16. (Austria) Tamira Paszek (qualified)
17. (Russia) Alla Kudryavtseva (qualified)
18. (Australia) Olivia Rogowska (first round)
19. (Sweden) Sofia Arvidsson (first round)
20. (Paraguay) Verónica Cepede Royg (qualifying competition)
21. (Russia) Alexandra Panova (first round)
22. (United States) Grace Min (second round)
23. (Canada) Aleksandra Wozniak (qualified)
24. (Ukraine) Maryna Zanevska (second round)

== Qualifiers ==
1. (Russia) Alla Kudryavtseva
2. (Czech Republic) Tereza Smitková
3. (Switzerland) Timea Bacsinszky
4. (Portugal) Michelle Larcher de Brito
5. (Canada) Aleksandra Wozniak
6. (Ukraine) Lesia Tsurenko
7. (Poland) Paula Kania
8. (Croatia) Ana Konjuh
9. (United States) Victoria Duval
10. (Austria) Tamira Paszek
11. (Estonia) Anett Kontaveit
12. (Romania) Andreea Mitu

== Qualifying draw ==
=== First qualifier ===
First round
1	(Netherlands) Kiki Bertens	4	6	4
(Japan) Eri Hozumi	6	4	6
(France) Irena Pavlovic	6	6
(Netherlands) Arantxa Rus	2	3
(Ukraine) Yuliya Beygelzimer	3	6	6
(Switzerland) Viktorija Golubic	6	3	2
WC	(United Kingdom) Freya Christie	4	2
17	(Russia) Alla Kudryavtseva	6	6

Second round
(Japan) Eri Hozumi	3	1
(France) Irena Pavlovic	6	6
(Ukraine) Yuliya Beygelzimer	2	6	1
17	(Russia) Alla Kudryavtseva	6	3	6

Qualifying competition
(France) Irena Pavlovic	1	5
17	(Russia) Alla Kudryavtseva	6	7

=== Second qualifier ===
First round
2	(France) Pauline Parmentier	2	6	4
(United States) Madison Brengle	6	3	6
(Belarus) Aliaksandra Sasnovich	6	1
(Russia) Ksenia Pervak	3	0^{r}
(Georgia (country)) Sofia Shapatava	3	6^{5}
(Czech Republic) Tereza Smitková	6	7^{7}
WC	(United Kingdom) Gabriella Taylor	6	6
19	(Sweden) Sofia Arvidsson	1	3

Second round
(United States) Madison Brengle	6	7^{7}
(Belarus) Aliaksandra Sasnovich	4	6^{2}
(Czech Republic) Tereza Smitková	6	6
WC	(United Kingdom) Gabriella Taylor	3	4

Qualifying competition
(United States) Madison Brengle	3	6	1
(Czech Republic) Tereza Smitková	6	3	6

=== Third qualifier ===
First round
3	(Switzerland) Timea Bacsinszky	6	6
(Colombia) Mariana Duque Mariño	3	3
(Serbia) Aleksandra Krunić	6	3	1
PR	(Hungary) Melinda Czink	2	6	6
(Netherlands) Indy de Vroome	6	3	6
(Japan) Risa Ozaki	2	6	8
(Japan) Erika Sema	3	1
20	(Paraguay) Verónica Cepede Royg	6	6

Second round
3	(Switzerland) Timea Bacsinszky	6	7^{7}
PR	(Hungary) Melinda Czink	3	6^{2}
(Japan) Risa Ozaki	3	3
20	(Paraguay) Verónica Cepede Royg	6	6

Qualifying competition
3	(Switzerland) Timea Bacsinszky	7	6
20	(Paraguay) Verónica Cepede Royg	5	4

=== Fourth qualifier ===
First round
4	(Portugal) Michelle Larcher de Brito	6	6
(Argentina) María Irigoyen	3	3
(Czech Republic) Lucie Hradecká	6	3	6
(Australia) Anastasia Rodionova	2	6	1
(Ukraine) Kateryna Kozlova	6	6
(Ukraine) Anastasiya Vasylyeva	2	2
(Slovakia) Kristína Kučová	4	6	3
24	(Ukraine) Maryna Zanevska	6	4	6

Second round
4	(Portugal) Michelle Larcher de Brito	6	6
(Czech Republic) Lucie Hradecká	4	2
(Ukraine) Kateryna Kozlova	3	6	7
24	(Ukraine) Maryna Zanevska	6	3	5

Qualifying competition
4	(Portugal) Michelle Larcher de Brito	6	6
(Ukraine) Kateryna Kozlova	3	3

=== Fifth qualifier ===
First round
5	(Romania) Alexandra Dulgheru	6	6
(Italy) Nastassja Burnett	1	3
(Russia) Vera Dushevina	7^{7}	2	8
(United States) Melanie Oudin	6^{3}	6	10
(Japan) Mayo Hibi	7	2	6
(United States) Allie Kiick	5	6	1
(Czech Republic) Renata Voráčová	5	1
23	(Canada) Aleksandra Wozniak	7	6

Second round
5	(Romania) Alexandra Dulgheru	4	2
(United States) Melanie Oudin	6	6
(Japan) Mayo Hibi	6	4	1
23	(Canada) Aleksandra Wozniak	4	6	6

Qualifying competition
(United States) Melanie Oudin	4	3
23	(Canada) Aleksandra Wozniak	6	6

=== Sixth qualifier ===
First round
6	(Montenegro) Danka Kovinić	6	6
WC	(United Kingdom) Lisa Whybourn	4	1
WC	(United Kingdom) Emily Webley-Smith	3	6	2
(Spain) Beatriz García Vidagany	6	4	0^{r}
(Ukraine) Lesia Tsurenko	6	7^{7}
(Czech Republic) Eva Birnerová	3	6^{1}
(Japan) Ayumi Morita	6	2	6
21	(Russia) Alexandra Panova	2	6	3

Second round
6	(Montenegro) Danka Kovinić	6	3	6
WC	(United Kingdom) Emily Webley-Smith	1	6	1
(Ukraine) Lesia Tsurenko	7^{7}	6
(Japan) Ayumi Morita	6^{4}	1

Qualifying competition
6	(Montenegro) Danka Kovinić	5	0
(Ukraine) Lesia Tsurenko	7	6

=== Seventh qualifier ===
First round
7	(France) Claire Feuerstein	7	6
(Belgium) An-Sophie Mestach	5	2
(Poland) Paula Kania	6	6
(Russia) Polina Vinogradova	3	2
(Luxembourg) Mandy Minella	4	6	2
(United States) Shelby Rogers	6	4	6
(Argentina) Florencia Molinero	1	2
22	(United States) Grace Min	6	6

Second round
7	(France) Claire Feuerstein	5	4
(Poland) Paula Kania	7	6
(United States) Shelby Rogers	6	6
22	(United States) Grace Min	3	3

Qualifying competition
(Poland) Paula Kania	7^{14}	4	6
(United States) Shelby Rogers	6^{12}	6	3

=== Eighth qualifier ===
First round
8	(Serbia) Vesna Dolonc	6	2	2
(Liechtenstein) Stephanie Vogt	1	6	6
(Czech Republic) Kateřina Siniaková	4	2
(France) Mathilde Johansson	6	6
(Germany) Laura Siegemund	6	6
(Slovenia) Tadeja Majerič	2	2
(Croatia) Ana Konjuh	6	6
14	(Spain) Estrella Cabeza Candela	0	1

Second round
(Liechtenstein) Stephanie Vogt	7^{8}	7^{7}
(France) Mathilde Johansson	6^{6}	6^{4}
(Germany) Laura Siegemund	7^{8}	4	1
(Croatia) Ana Konjuh	6^{6}	6	6

Qualifying competition
(Liechtenstein) Stephanie Vogt	5	3
(Croatia) Ana Konjuh	7	6

=== Ninth qualifier ===
First round
9	(Ukraine) Nadiia Kichenok	6^{8}	5
(United States) Nicole Gibbs	7^{10}	7
WC	(United Kingdom) Jade Windley	5	1
(Germany) Carina Witthöft	7	6
(Japan) Misa Eguchi	6	6
(France) Alizé Lim	3	2
(Russia) Marta Sirotkina	4	2
15	(United States) Victoria Duval	6	6

Second round
(United States) Nicole Gibbs	6	6
(Germany) Carina Witthöft	4	4
(Japan) Misa Eguchi	2	2
15	(United States) Victoria Duval	6	6

Qualifying competition
(United States) Nicole Gibbs	4	6	3
15	(United States) Victoria Duval	6	4	6

=== Tenth qualifier ===
First round
10	(Spain) Lara Arruabarrena	5	6	4
(Russia) Ekaterina Bychkova	7	4	6
(Tunisia) Ons Jabeur	6	3
PR	(Russia) Vitalia Diatchenko	1	0^{r}
WC	(United Kingdom) Katie Boulter	4	7^{7}	2
(Italy) Alberta Brianti	6	6^{5}	6
WC	(United Kingdom) Katy Dunne	4	0
16	(Austria) Tamira Paszek	6	6

Second round
(Russia) Ekaterina Bychkova	6^{4}	4
(Tunisia) Ons Jabeur	7^{7}	6
(Italy) Alberta Brianti	0	6^{2}
16	(Austria) Tamira Paszek	6	7^{7}

Qualifying competition
(Tunisia) Ons Jabeur	1	6	5
16	(Austria) Tamira Paszek	6	3	7

=== Eleventh qualifier ===
First round
11	(China) Zheng Saisai	2	1
(Estonia) Anett Kontaveit	6	6
(Latvia) Diāna Marcinkēviča	4	2
(Kazakhstan) Sesil Karatantcheva	6	6
(Turkey) Çağla Büyükakçay	1	2
(Australia) Ashleigh Barty	6	6
(Ukraine) Lyudmyla Kichenok	7^{8}	6
13	(Poland) Magda Linette	6^{6}	1

Second round
(Estonia) Anett Kontaveit	6	2	6
(Kazakhstan) Sesil Karatantcheva	2	6	2
(Australia) Ashleigh Barty	6	7
(Ukraine) Lyudmyla Kichenok	3	5

Qualifying competition
(Estonia) Anett Kontaveit	6^{5}	6	6
(Australia) Ashleigh Barty	7^{7}	3	4

=== Twelfth qualifier ===
First round
12	(Thailand) Luksika Kumkhum	7	6
(Ukraine) Olga Savchuk	5	4
(United States) Sachia Vickery	5	6^{8}
(Romania) Andreea Mitu	7	7^{10}
(Canada) Heidi El Tabakh	4	2
(Netherlands) Richèl Hogenkamp	6	6
(United States) Irina Falconi	2	6	7
18	(Australia) Olivia Rogowska	6	1	5

Second round
12	(Thailand) Luksika Kumkhum	6	3	4
(Romania) Andreea Mitu	4	6	6
(Netherlands) Richèl Hogenkamp	4	4
(United States) Irina Falconi	6	6

Qualifying competition
(Romania) Andreea Mitu	6	6^{0}	6
(United States) Irina Falconi	2	7^{7}	2
