= 2014 Wimbledon Championships – Women's doubles qualifying =

Women's doubles qualifying
- 2014 Wimbledon Championships

Events
Singles	men	women		boys	girls
Doubles	men	women	mixed	boys	girls
WC Singles	men	women	quad
WC Doubles	men	women	quad
Legends	men	women	seniors

Qualification
Singles	men	women
Doubles	men	women
- Wimbledon Championships

Players and pairs who neither have high enough rankings nor receive wild cards may participate in a qualifying tournament held one week before the annual Wimbledon Tennis Championships.

== Seeds ==
1. (Ukraine) Lyudmyla Kichenok / (Ukraine) Nadiia Kichenok (qualified)
2. (Ukraine) Yuliya Beygelzimer / (Poland) Klaudia Jans-Ignacik (qualifying competition, lucky losers)
3. (Chinese Taipei) Chan Chin-wei / (China) Xu Yifan (qualifying competition)
4. (Australia) Monique Adamczak / (Australia) Olivia Rogowska (first round)
5. (Australia) Jarmila Gajdošová / (Australia) Arina Rodionova (qualified)
6. (Luxembourg) Mandy Minella / (Russia) Alexandra Panova (first round)
7. (Colombia) Mariana Duque Mariño / (Argentina) María Irigoyen (first round)
8. (France) Stéphanie Foretz Gacon / (Thailand) Tamarine Tanasugarn (first round)

== Qualifiers ==
1. (Ukraine) Lyudmyla Kichenok / (Ukraine) Nadiia Kichenok
2. (Australia) Jarmila Gajdošová / (Australia) Arina Rodionova
3. (France) Pauline Parmentier / (France) Laura Thorpe
4. (Serbia) Vesna Dolonc / (Chile) Daniela Seguel

== Lucky losers ==
1. (Ukraine) Yuliya Beygelzimer / (Poland) Klaudia Jans-Ignacik

== Qualifying draw ==
=== First qualifier ===
First round
1	(Ukraine) Lyudmyla Kichenok (Ukraine) Nadiia Kichenok	6	1	9
(Argentina) Paula Ormaechea (Brazil) Teliana Pereira	1	6	7
WC	(United Kingdom) Katie Boulter (United Kingdom) Katy Dunne	4	6	7
8	(France) Stéphanie Foretz Gacon (Thailand) Tamarine Tanasugarn	6	4	5

Qualifying competition
1	(Ukraine) Lyudmyla Kichenok (Ukraine) Nadiia Kichenok	6	6
WC	(United Kingdom) Katie Boulter (United Kingdom) Katy Dunne	1	4

=== Second qualifier ===
First round
2	(Ukraine) Yuliya Beygelzimer (Poland) Klaudia Jans-Ignacik	6	6
WC	(United Kingdom) Samantha Murray (United Kingdom) Jade Windley	4	2
Alt	(United States) Irina Falconi (United States) Maria Sanchez	4	5
5	(Australia) Jarmila Gajdošová (Australia) Arina Rodionova	6	7

Qualifying competition
2	(Ukraine) Yuliya Beygelzimer (Poland) Klaudia Jans-Ignacik	2	4
5	(Australia) Jarmila Gajdošová (Australia) Arina Rodionova	6	6

=== Third qualifier ===
First round
3	(Chinese Taipei) Chan Chin-wei (China) Xu Yifan	5	6	6
(Spain) Lara Arruabarrena (Romania) Alexandra Dulgheru	7	2	3
(France) Pauline Parmentier (France) Laura Thorpe	6	6
6	(Luxembourg) Mandy Minella (Russia) Alexandra Panova	4	3

Qualifying competition
3	(Chinese Taipei) Chan Chin-wei (China) Xu Yifan	4	2
(France) Pauline Parmentier (France) Laura Thorpe	6	6

=== Fourth qualifier ===
First round
4	(Australia) Monique Adamczak (Australia) Olivia Rogowska	2	5
(Switzerland) Timea Bacsinszky (Sweden) Johanna Larsson	6	7
(Serbia) Vesna Dolonc (Chile) Daniela Seguel	6	6
7	(Colombia) Mariana Duque Mariño (Argentina) María Irigoyen	1	3

Qualifying competition
(Switzerland) Timea Bacsinszky (Sweden) Johanna Larsson	4	6^{7}
(Serbia) Vesna Dolonc (Chile) Daniela Seguel	6	7^{9}
