= 2014 Wimbledon Championships – Day-by-day summaries =

The 2014 Wimbledon Championships are described below in detail, in the form of day-by-day summaries.

== Day-by-day summaries ==
=== Day 1 (23 June) ===
- Seeds out:
  - Men's singles: (Spain) Fernando Verdasco [18], (Italy) Andreas Seppi [25], (Canada) Vasek Pospisil [31]
  - Women's Singles: (Australia) Samantha Stosur [17], (United States) Sloane Stephens [18], (Spain) Garbiñe Muguruza [27]
- Schedule

Matches on main courts
Matches on Centre Court
Event	Winner	Loser	Score
Gentlemen's Singles 1st Round	(United Kingdom) Andy Murray [3]	(Belgium) David Goffin	6–1, 6–4, 7–5
Ladies' Singles 1st Round	(China) Li Na [2]	(Poland) Paula Kania [Q]	7–5, 6–2
Gentlemen's Singles 1st Round	(Serbia) Novak Djokovic [1]	(Kazakhstan) Andrey Golubev	6–0, 6–1, 6–4
Ladies' Singles 1st Round	(Slovakia) Dominika Cibulková [10]	(Canada) Aleksandra Wozniak [Q]	6–1, 6–2
Matches on No. 1 Court
Event	Winner	Loser	Score
Ladies' Singles 1st Round	(Belarus) Victoria Azarenka [8]	(Croatia) Mirjana Lučić-Baroni	6–3, 7–5
Gentlemen's Singles 1st Round	(Bulgaria) Grigor Dimitrov [11]	(United States) Ryan Harrison [Q]	7–6^{(7–1)}, 6–3, 6–2
Gentlemen's Singles 1st Round	(Austria) Jürgen Melzer vs. (France) Jo-Wilfried Tsonga [14]		1–6, 6–3, 6–3, 2–6, 4–5, suspended
Matches on No. 2 Court
Event	Winner	Loser	Score
Gentlemen's Singles 1st Round	(Czech Republic) Tomáš Berdych [6]	(Romania) Victor Hănescu	6–7^{(5–7)}, 6–1, 6–4, 6–3
Ladies' Singles 1st Round	(United States) Venus Williams [30]	(Spain) María Teresa Torró Flor	6–4, 4–6, 6–2
Gentlemen's Singles 1st Round	(Russia) Andrey Kuznetsov	(United Kingdom) Dan Evans [WC]	6–1, 7–5, 3–6, 7–6^{(7–5)}
Ladies' Singles 1st Round	(Romania) Andreea Mitu [Q] vs. (Poland) Agnieszka Radwańska [4]		2–4, suspended
Matches on No. 3 Court
Event	Winner	Loser	Score
Ladies' Singles 1st Round	(Belgium) Yanina Wickmayer	(Australia) Samantha Stosur [17]	6–3, 6–4
Gentlemen's Singles 1st Round	(Russia) Mikhail Youzhny [17]	(United Kingdom) James Ward [WC]	6–2, 6–2, 6–1
Gentlemen's Singles 1st Round	(Spain) David Ferrer [7]	(Spain) Pablo Carreño Busta	6–0, 6–7^{(3–7)}, 6–1, 6–1
Ladies' Singles 1st Round	(Czech Republic) Petra Kvitová [6]	(Czech Republic) Andrea Hlaváčková	6–3, 6–0

=== Day 2 (24 June) ===
- Seeds out:
  - Men's Singles: (Spain) Guillermo García-López [28], (Croatia) Ivo Karlović [29], (Russia) Dmitry Tursunov [32]
  - Women's Singles: (Serbia) Jelena Janković [7], (Italy) Sara Errani [14], (Italy) Roberta Vinci [21], (Russia) Anastasia Pavlyuchenkova [26], (Russia) Svetlana Kuznetsova [28], (Romania) Sorana Cîrstea [29]
- Schedule

Matches on main courts
Matches on Centre Court
Event	Winner	Loser	Score
Ladies' Singles 1st Round	(Germany) Sabine Lisicki [19]	(Israel) Julia Glushko	6–2, 6–1
Gentlemen's Singles 1st Round	(Spain) Rafael Nadal [2]	(Slovakia) Martin Kližan	4–6, 6–3, 6–3, 6–3
Ladies' Singles 1st Round	(United States) Serena Williams [1]	(United States) Anna Tatishvili	6–1, 6–2
Ladies' Singles 1st Round	(Romania) Simona Halep [3]	(Brazil) Teliana Pereira	6–2, 6–2
Matches on No. 1 Court
Event	Winner	Loser	Score
Gentlemen's Singles 1st Round	(France) Jo-Wilfried Tsonga [14]	(Austria) Jürgen Melzer	6–1, 3–6, 3–6, 6–2, 6–4
Gentlemen's Singles 1st Round	(Switzerland) Roger Federer [4]	(Italy) Paolo Lorenzi	6–1, 6–1, 6–3
Ladies' Singles 1st Round	(Russia) Maria Sharapova [5]	(United Kingdom) Samantha Murray [WC]	6–1, 6–0
Ladies' Singles 1st Round	(Canada) Eugenie Bouchard [13]	(Slovakia) Daniela Hantuchová	7–5, 7–5
Ladies' Singles 1st Round	(Serbia) Ana Ivanovic [11]	(Italy) Francesca Schiavone	7–6^{(8–6)}, 6–4
Matches on No. 2 Court
Event	Winner	Loser	Score
Gentlemen's Singles 1st Round	(Switzerland) Stan Wawrinka [5]	(Portugal) João Sousa	6–3, 6–4, 6–3
Ladies' Singles 1st Round	(Poland) Agnieszka Radwańska [4]	(Romania) Andreea Mitu [Q]	6–2, 6–1
Gentlemen's Singles 1st Round	(Canada) Milos Raonic [8]	(Australia) Matthew Ebden	6–2, 6–4, 6–4
Ladies' Singles 1st Round	(Germany) Angelique Kerber [9]	(Poland) Urszula Radwańska	6–2, 6–4
Ladies' Singles 1st Round	(Estonia) Kaia Kanepi	(Serbia) Jelena Janković [7]	6–3, 6–2
Ladies' Singles 1st Round	(Russia) Vera Zvonareva [WC] vs. (United Kingdom) Tara Moore [WC]		6–4, 6–7^{(3–7)}, suspended
Matches on No. 3 Court
Event	Winner	Loser	Score
Gentlemen's Singles 1st Round	(Australia) Lleyton Hewitt	(Poland) Michał Przysiężny	6–2, 6–7^{(14–16)}, 6–1, 6–4
Ladies' Singles 1st Round	(United Kingdom) Heather Watson	(Croatia) Ajla Tomljanović	6–3, 6–2
Gentlemen's Singles 1st Round	(United States) John Isner [9]	(United Kingdom) Daniel Smethurst [WC]	7–5, 6–3, 6–4
Ladies' Singles 1st Round	(Spain) Carla Suárez Navarro [15]	(China) Zhang Shuai	6–1, 6–2

=== Day 3 (25 June) ===
- Seeds out:
  - Men's Singles: (Spain) David Ferrer [7], (Latvia) Ernests Gulbis [12], (Russia) Mikhail Youzhny [17]
  - Women's Singles: (Belarus) Victoria Azarenka [8], (Italy) Flavia Pennetta [12], (Russia) Elena Vesnina [32]
  - Women's Doubles: (Czech Republic) Květa Peschke / (Slovenia) Katarina Srebotnik [3]
- Schedule

Matches on main courts
Matches on Centre Court
Event	Winner	Loser	Score
Ladies' Singles 2nd Round	(Poland) Agnieszka Radwańska [4]	(Australia) Casey Dellacqua	6–4, 6–0
Gentlemen's Singles 2nd Round	(Bulgaria) Grigor Dimitrov [11]	(Australia) Luke Saville [Q]	6–3, 6–2, 6–4
Gentlemen's Singles 2nd Round	(Serbia) Novak Djokovic [1]	(Czech Republic) Radek Štěpánek	6–4, 6–3, 6–7^{(5–7)}, 7–6^{(7–5)}
Matches on No. 1 Court
Event	Winner	Loser	Score
Gentlemen's Singles 2nd Round	(United Kingdom) Andy Murray [3]	(Slovenia) Blaž Rola	6–1, 6–1, 6–0
Ladies' Singles 2nd Round	(Czech Republic) Petra Kvitová [6]	(Germany) Mona Barthel	6–2, 6–0
Gentlemen's Singles 2nd Round	(Czech Republic) Tomáš Berdych [6]	(Australia) Bernard Tomic	4–6, 7–6^{(7–5)}, 7–6^{(7–3)}, 6–1
Ladies' Singles 2nd Round	(Denmark) Caroline Wozniacki [16]	(United Kingdom) Naomi Broady [WC]	6–3, 6–2
Matches on No. 2 Court
Event	Winner	Loser	Score
Ladies' Singles 2nd Round	(China) Li Na [2]	(Austria) Yvonne Meusburger	6–2, 6–2
Ladies' Singles 1st Round	(Russia) Vera Zvonareva [WC]	(United Kingdom) Tara Moore [WC]	6–4, 6–7^{(3–7)}, 9–7
Gentlemen's Singles 2nd Round	(Russia) Andrey Kuznetsov	(Spain) David Ferrer [7]	6–7^{(5–7)}, 6–0, 3–6, 6–3, 6–2
Gentlemen's Singles 2nd Round	(United States) Sam Querrey vs. (France) Jo-Wilfried Tsonga [14]		6–4, 6–7^{(2–7)}, 7–6^{(7–4)}, 3–6, 9–9, suspended
Matches on No. 3 Court
Event	Winner	Loser	Score
Ladies' Singles 2nd Round	(United States) Venus Williams [30]	(Japan) Kurumi Nara	7–6^{(7–4)}, 6–1
Gentlemen's Singles 2nd Round	(Argentina) Leonardo Mayer	(Cyprus) Marcos Baghdatis [WC]	7–6^{(7–4)}, 4–6, 6–1, 6–4
Ladies' Singles 2nd Round	(Serbia) Bojana Jovanovski	(Belarus) Victoria Azarenka [8]	6–3, 3–6, 7–5
Ladies' Doubles 1st Round	(United States) Serena Williams [8] (United States) Venus Williams [8]	(Georgia (country)) Oksana Kalashnikova (Ukraine) Olga Savchuk	5–7, 6–1, 6–4

=== Day 4 (26 June) ===
- Seeds out:
  - Men's Singles: (France) Richard Gasquet [13], (Germany) Philipp Kohlschreiber [22], (France) Gaël Monfils [24]
  - Women's Singles: (Spain) Carla Suárez Navarro [15], (Czech Republic) Klára Koukalová [31]
  - Men's Doubles: (Philippines) Treat Huey / (United Kingdom) Dominic Inglot [10]
- Schedule

Matches on main courts
Matches on Centre Court
Event	Winner	Loser	Score
Gentlemen's Singles 2nd Round	(Spain) Rafael Nadal [2]	(Czech Republic) Lukáš Rosol	4–6, 7–6^{(8–6)}, 6–4, 6–4
Ladies' Singles 2nd Round	(Germany) Angelique Kerber [9]	(United Kingdom) Heather Watson	6–2, 5–7, 6–1
Gentlemen's Singles 2nd Round	(Switzerland) Roger Federer [4]	(Luxembourg) Gilles Müller [Q]	6–3, 7–5, 6–3
Matches on No. 1 Court
Event	Winner	Loser	Score
Ladies' Singles 2nd Round	(United States) Serena Williams [1]	(South Africa) Chanelle Scheepers	6–1, 6–1
Gentlemen's Singles 2nd Round	(Switzerland) Stan Wawrinka [5]	(Chinese Taipei) Lu Yen-hsun	7–6^{(8–6)}, 6–3, 3–6, 7–5
Ladies' Singles 2nd Round	(Russia) Maria Sharapova [5]	(Switzerland) Timea Bacsinszky [Q]	6–2, 6–1
Matches on No. 2 Court
Event	Winner	Loser	Score
Gentlemen's Singles 2nd Round	(Australia) Nick Kyrgios [WC]	(France) Richard Gasquet [13]	3–6, 6–7^{(4–7)}, 6–4, 7–5, 10–8
Gentlemen's Singles 2nd Round	(France) Jo-Wilfried Tsonga [14]	(United States) Sam Querrey	4–6, 7–6^{(7–2)}, 6–7^{(4–7)}, 6–3, 14–12
Ladies' Singles 2nd Round	(Canada) Eugenie Bouchard [13]	(Spain) Sílvia Soler Espinosa [WC]	7–5, 6–1
Gentlemen's Singles 2nd Round	(Poland) Jerzy Janowicz [15] vs. (Australia) Lleyton Hewitt		7–5, 4–4, suspended
Matches on No. 3 Court
Event	Winner	Loser	Score
Gentlemen's Singles 2nd Round	(Canada) Milos Raonic [8]	(United States) Jack Sock	6–3, 6–4, 6–4
Ladies' Singles 2nd Round	(Serbia) Ana Ivanovic [11]	(China) Zheng Jie	6–4, 6–0
Ladies' Singles 2nd Round	(Germany) Sabine Lisicki [19]	(Czech Republic) Karolína Plíšková	6–3, 7–5
Gentlemen's Singles 2nd Round	(United States) John Isner [9]	(Finland) Jarkko Nieminen	7–6^{(19–17)}, 7–6^{(7–3)}, 7–5

=== Day 5 (27 June) ===
- Seeds out:
  - Men's Singles: (Czech Republic) Tomáš Berdych [6], (Italy) Fabio Fognini [16], (Ukraine) Alexandr Dolgopolov [21], (Spain) Roberto Bautista Agut [27], (Spain) Marcel Granollers [30]
  - Women's Singles: (China) Li Na [2], (Slovakia) Dominika Cibulková [10], (United States) Venus Williams [30]
  - Women's Doubles: (Czech Republic) Lucie Hradecká / (Netherlands) Michaëlla Krajicek [13], (United States) Liezel Huber / (United States) Lisa Raymond [15]
- Schedule

Matches on main courts
Matches on Centre Court
Event	Winner	Loser	Score
Gentlemen's Singles 3rd Round	(Serbia) Novak Djokovic [1]	(France) Gilles Simon	6–4, 6–2, 6–4
Ladies' Singles 3rd Round	(Czech Republic) Petra Kvitová [6]	(United States) Venus Williams [30]	5–7, 7–6^{(7–2)}, 7–5
Gentlemen's Singles 3rd Round	(United Kingdom) Andy Murray [3]	(Spain) Roberto Bautista Agut [27]	6–2, 6–3, 6–2
Matches on No. 1 Court
Event	Winner	Loser	Score
Ladies' Singles 3rd Round	(Czech Republic) Barbora Záhlavová-Strýcová	(China) Li Na [2]	7–6^{(7–5)}, 7–6^{(7–5)}
Gentlemen's Singles 3rd Round	(Bulgaria) Grigor Dimitrov [11]	(Ukraine) Alexandr Dolgopolov [21]	6–7^{(3–7)}, 6–4, 2–6, 6–4, 6–1
Mixed Doubles 1st Round	(Russia) Mikhail Elgin (Australia) Anastasia Rodionova	(United Kingdom) Ross Hutchins [WC] (United Kingdom) Heather Watson [WC]	6–1, 1–6, 9–7
Matches on No. 2 Court
Event	Winner	Loser	Score
Ladies' Singles 2nd Round	(Romania) Simona Halep [3]	(Ukraine) Lesia Tsurenko [Q]	6–3, 4–6, 6–4
Gentlemen's Singles 2nd Round	(Poland) Jerzy Janowicz [15]	(Australia) Lleyton Hewitt	7–5, 6–4, 6–7^{(6–8)}, 4–6, 6–3
Ladies' Singles 3rd Round	(Poland) Agnieszka Radwańska [4]	(Portugal) Michelle Larcher de Brito [Q]	6–2, 6–0
Gentlemen's Doubles 2nd Round	(United Kingdom) Jamie Murray [14] (Australia) John Peers [14]	(United Kingdom) Jamie Delgado (Luxembourg) Gilles Müller	6–3, 7–6^{(9–7)}, 6–3
Matches on No. 3 Court
Event	Winner	Loser	Score
Ladies' Singles 3rd Round	(Denmark) Caroline Wozniacki [16]	(Croatia) Ana Konjuh [Q]	6–3, 6–0
Gentlemen's Singles 3rd Round	(France) Jo-Wilfried Tsonga [14]	(Chinese Taipei) Jimmy Wang [Q]	6–2, 6–2, 7–5
Ladies' Singles 3rd Round	(Czech Republic) Lucie Šafářová [23]	(Slovakia) Dominika Cibulková [10]	6–4, 6–2
Mixed Doubles 1st Round	(Czech Republic) Lukáš Dlouhý (United States) Liezel Huber	(New Zealand) Michael Venus [Alt] (Poland) Alicja Rosolska [Alt]	6–3, 6–4
Gentlemen's Singles 3rd Round	(Croatia) Marin Čilić [26]	(Czech Republic) Tomáš Berdych [6]	7–6^{(7–5)}, 6–4, 7–6^{(8–6)}

=== Day 6 (28 June) ===
- Seeds out:
  - Men's Singles: (Poland) Jerzy Janowicz [15]
  - Women's Singles: (United States) Serena Williams [1], (Germany) Andrea Petkovic [20], (Belgium) Kirsten Flipkens [24]
  - Women's Doubles: (Zimbabwe) Cara Black / (India) Sania Mirza [4]
- Schedule

Matches on main courts
Matches on Centre Court
Event	Winner	Loser	Score
Gentlemen's Singles 3rd Round	(Spain) Rafael Nadal [2]	(Kazakhstan) Mikhail Kukushkin	6–7^{(4–7)}, 6–1, 6–1, 6–1
Ladies' Singles 3rd Round	(Russia) Maria Sharapova [5]	(United States) Alison Riske	6–3, 6–0
Gentlemen's Singles 3rd Round	(Switzerland) Roger Federer [4]	(Colombia) Santiago Giraldo	6–3, 6–1, 6–3
Matches on No. 1 Court
Event	Winner	Loser	Score
Ladies' Singles 3rd Round	(France) Alizé Cornet [25]	(United States) Serena Williams [1]	1–6, 6–3, 6–4
Ladies' Singles 3rd Round	(Serbia) Ana Ivanovic [11] vs. (Germany) Sabine Lisicki [19]		4–6, 1–1, suspended
Matches on No. 2 Court
Event	Winner	Loser	Score
Gentlemen's Singles 3rd Round	(Canada) Milos Raonic [8]	(Poland) Łukasz Kubot	7–6^{(7–2)}, 7–6^{(7–4)}, 6–2
Boys' Singles 1st Round	(Russia) Daniil Medvedev [16] vs. (Serbia) Petar Čonkić		6–3, 3–3, suspended
Matches on No. 3 Court
Event	Winner	Loser	Score
Ladies' Singles 3rd Round	(Canada) Eugenie Bouchard [13]	(Germany) Andrea Petkovic [20]	6–3, 6–4
Girls' Singles 1st Round	(China) Xu Shilin [10]	(United Kingdom) Emily Arbuthnott [WC]	6–3, 6–2

=== Middle Sunday (29 June) ===
Following tradition, Middle Sunday was a day of rest, with no matches played.

=== Day 7 (30 June) ===
- Seeds out:
  - Men's Singles: (United States) John Isner [9], (France) Jo-Wilfried Tsonga [14], (South Africa) Kevin Anderson [20]
  - Women's Singles: (Poland) Agnieszka Radwańska [4], (Serbia) Ana Ivanovic [11], (Denmark) Caroline Wozniacki [16], (France) Alizé Cornet [25]
  - Men's Doubles: (Poland) Łukasz Kubot / (Sweden) Robert Lindstedt [7]
  - Mixed Doubles: (India) Leander Paes / (Zimbabwe) Cara Black [4]
- Schedule

Matches on main courts
Matches on Centre Court
Event	Winner	Loser	Score
Ladies' Singles 4th Round	(Canada) Eugenie Bouchard [13]	(France) Alizé Cornet [25]	7–6^{(7–5)}, 7–5
Gentlemen's Singles 4th Round	(United Kingdom) Andy Murray [3]	(South Africa) Kevin Anderson [20]	6–4, 6–3, 7–6^{(8–6)}
Gentlemen's Singles 4th Round	(Serbia) Novak Djokovic [1]	(France) Jo-Wilfried Tsonga [14]	6–3, 6–4, 7–6^{(7–5)}
Matches on No. 1 Court
Event	Winner	Loser	Score
Ladies' Singles 3rd Round	(Germany) Sabine Lisicki [19]	(Serbia) Ana Ivanovic [11]	6–4, 3–6, 6–1
Gentlemen's Singles 4th Round	(Bulgaria) Grigor Dimitrov [11]	(Argentina) Leonardo Mayer	6–4, 7–6^{(8–6)}, 6–2
Matches on No. 2 Court
Event	Winner	Loser	Score
Gentlemen's Singles 3rd Round	(Switzerland) Stan Wawrinka [5]	(Uzbekistan) Denis Istomin	6–3, 6–3, 6–4
Ladies' Singles 4th Round	(Czech Republic) Petra Kvitová [6]	(China) Peng Shuai	6–3, 6–2
Matches on No. 3 Court
Event	Winner	Loser	Score
Gentlemen's Singles 3rd Round	(Spain) Feliciano López [19]	(United States) John Isner [9]	6–7^{(10–8)}, 7–6^{(8–6)}, 7–6^{(7–3)}, 7–5
Ladies' Singles 4th Round	(Russia) Ekaterina Makarova [22]	(Poland) Agnieszka Radwańska [4]	6–3, 6–0

=== Day 8 (1 July) ===
- Seeds out:
  - Men's Singles: (Spain) Rafael Nadal [2], (Japan) Kei Nishikori [10], (Spain) Feliciano López [19], (Spain) Tommy Robredo [23]
  - Women's Singles: (Russia) Maria Sharapova [5], (Russia) Ekaterina Makarova [22]
  - Men's Doubles: (Spain) Marcel Granollers / (Spain) Marc López [6], (India) Rohan Bopanna / (Pakistan) Aisam-ul-Haq Qureshi [8], (United States) Eric Butorac / (South Africa) Raven Klaasen [13], (United Kingdom) Jamie Murray / (Australia) John Peers [14], (Colombia) Juan Sebastián Cabal / (Poland) Marcin Matkowski [15], (Uruguay) Pablo Cuevas / (Spain) David Marrero [16]
  - Women's Doubles: (Russia) Ekaterina Makarova / (Russia) Elena Vesnina [5], (United States) Serena Williams / (United States) Venus Williams [8], (Spain) Anabel Medina Garrigues / (Kazakhstan) Yaroslava Shvedova [12], (Spain) Garbiñe Muguruza / (Spain) Carla Suárez Navarro [16]
  - Mixed Doubles: (United States) Mike Bryan / (Slovenia) Katarina Srebotnik [1], (Austria) Alexander Peya / (United States) Abigail Spears [3], (Spain) David Marrero / (Spain) Arantxa Parra Santonja [9], (Colombia) Juan Sebastián Cabal / (United States) Raquel Kops-Jones [11]
- Schedule

Matches on main courts
Matches on Centre Court
Event	Winner	Loser	Score
Ladies' Singles 4th Round	(Germany) Angelique Kerber [9]	(Russia) Maria Sharapova [5]	7–6^{(7–4)}, 4–6, 6–4
Gentlemen's Singles 4th Round	(Australia) Nick Kyrgios [WC]	(Spain) Rafael Nadal [2]	7–6^{(7–5)}, 5–7, 7–6^{(7–5)}, 6–3
Ladies' Singles Quarterfinals	(Czech Republic) Petra Kvitová [6]	(Czech Republic) Barbora Záhlavová-Strýcová	6–1, 7–5
Matches on No. 1 Court
Event	Winner	Loser	Score
Gentlemen's Singles 4th Round	(Switzerland) Roger Federer [4]	(Spain) Tommy Robredo [23]	6–1, 6–4, 6–4
Ladies' Singles Quarterfinals	(Czech Republic) Lucie Šafářová [23]	(Russia) Ekaterina Makarova [22]	6–3, 6–1
Ladies' Doubles 2nd Round	(Germany) Kristina Barrois (Switzerland) Stefanie Vögele	(United States) Serena Williams [8] (United States) Venus Williams [8]	3–0, retired
Ladies' Doubles 3rd Round	(Australia) Ashleigh Barty [6] (Australia) Casey Dellacqua [6]	(Spain) Anabel Medina Garrigues [12] (Kazakhstan) Yaroslava Shvedova [12]	7–6^{(7–4)}, 6–0
Senior Gentlemen's Invitation Doubles Round Robin	(Iran) Mansour Bahrami (France) Henri Leconte	(United States) Peter Fleming (United States) Patrick McEnroe	7–6^{(7–4)}, 6–3
Matches on No. 2 Court
Event	Winner	Loser	Score
Ladies' Singles 4th Round	(Romania) Simona Halep [3]	(Kazakhstan) Zarina Diyas	6–3, 6–0
Gentlemen's Singles 4th Round	(Switzerland) Stan Wawrinka [5]	(Spain) Feliciano López [19]	7–6^{(7–5)}, 7–6^{(9–7)}, 6–3
Ladies' Doubles 2nd Round	(Italy) Sara Errani [2] (Italy) Roberta Vinci [2]	(Ukraine) Lyudmyla Kichenok (Ukraine) Nadiia Kichenok	5–7, 7–6^{(12–10)}, 6–1
Gentlemen's Doubles 2nd Round	(Netherlands) Jean-Julien Rojer [11] (Romania) Horia Tecău [11]	(Spain) Feliciano López (Austria) Jürgen Melzer	7–6^{(7–3)}, 6–3, 7–6^{(10–8)}
Gentlemen's Invitation Doubles Round Robin	(Sweden) Jonas Björkman (Australia) Todd Woodbridge	(United States) Justin Gimelstob (The Bahamas) Mark Knowles	1–1, retired
Matches on No. 3 Court
Event	Winner	Loser	Score
Ladies' Singles 4th Round	(Germany) Sabine Lisicki [19]	(Kazakhstan) Yaroslava Shvedova	6–3, 3–6, 6–4
Gentlemen's Singles 4th Round	(Canada) Milos Raonic [8]	(Japan) Kei Nishikori [10]	4–6, 6–1, 7–6^{(7–4)}, 6–3
Gentlemen's Doubles 3rd Round	(France) Michaël Llodra [12] (France) Nicolas Mahut [12]	(Spain) Marcel Granollers [6] (Spain) Marc López [6]	7–6^{(7–2)}, 7–5, 7–5
Mixed Doubles 3rd Round	(India) Rohan Bopanna [7] (Czech Republic) Andrea Hlaváčková [7]	(United Kingdom) Colin Fleming (United Kingdom) Jocelyn Rae	6–4, 7–5

=== Day 9 (2 July) ===
- Seeds out:
  - Men's Singles: (United Kingdom) Andy Murray [3], (Switzerland) Stan Wawrinka [5], (Croatia) Marin Čilić [26]
  - Women's Singles: (Germany) Angelique Kerber [9], (Germany) Sabine Lisicki [19]
  - Men's Doubles: (France) Julien Benneteau / (France) Édouard Roger-Vasselin [4], (Austria) Julian Knowle / (Brazil) Marcelo Melo [9], (Netherlands) Jean-Julien Rojer / (Romania) Horia Tecău [11]
  - Women's Doubles: (Chinese Taipei) Hsieh Su-wei / (China) Peng Shuai [1], (United States) Raquel Kops-Jones / (United States) Abigail Spears [7], (Germany) Julia Görges / (Germany) Anna-Lena Grönefeld [10]
  - Mixed Doubles: (United States) Bob Bryan / (Czech Republic) Květa Peschke [2], (India) Rohan Bopanna / (Czech Republic) Andrea Hlaváčková [7], (Netherlands) Jean-Julien Rojer / (Germany) Anna-Lena Grönefeld [8], (Australia) John Peers / (Australia) Ashleigh Barty [12]
- Schedule

Matches on main courts
Matches on Centre Court
Event	Winner	Loser	Score
Ladies' Singles Quarterfinals	(Romania) Simona Halep [3]	(Germany) Sabine Lisicki [19]	6–4, 6–0
Gentlemen's Singles Quarterfinals	(Bulgaria) Grigor Dimitrov [11]	(United Kingdom) Andy Murray [3]	6–1, 7–6^{(7–4)}, 6–2
Gentlemen's Singles Quarterfinals	(Switzerland) Roger Federer [4]	(Switzerland) Stan Wawrinka [5]	3–6, 7–6^{(7–5)}, 6–4, 6–4
Senior Gentlemen's Invitation Doubles Round Robin	(United Kingdom) Jeremy Bates (Sweden) Anders Järryd	(Spain) Sergio Casal (Sweden) Joakim Nyström	6–2, 6–4
Matches on No. 1 Court
Event	Winner	Loser	Score
Ladies' Singles Quarterfinals	(Canada) Eugenie Bouchard [13]	(Germany) Angelique Kerber [9]	6–3, 6–4
Gentlemen's Singles Quarterfinals	(Serbia) Novak Djokovic [1]	(Croatia) Marin Čilić [26]	6–1, 3–6, 6–7^{(4–7)}, 6–2, 6–2
Gentlemen's Singles Quarterfinals	(Canada) Milos Raonic [8]	(Australia) Nick Kyrgios [WC]	6–7^{(4–7)}, 6–2, 6–4, 7–6^{(7–4)}
Matches on No. 2 Court
Event	Winner	Loser	Score
Ladies' Doubles 3rd Round	(Italy) Sara Errani [2] (Italy) Roberta Vinci [2]	(Japan) Shuko Aoyama (Czech Republic) Renata Voráčová	7–5, 6–3
Gentlemen's Doubles Quarterfinals	(United States) Bob Bryan [1] (United States) Mike Bryan [1]	(Austria) Julian Knowle [9] (Brazil) Marcelo Melo [9]	3–6, 7–6^{(8–6)}, 6–4, 6–4
Mixed Doubles 3rd Round	(Brazil) Bruno Soares [13] (Switzerland) Martina Hingis [13]	(Slovakia) Martin Kližan (Switzerland) Belinda Bencic	6–3, 5–7, 9–7
Mixed Doubles 3rd Round	(Pakistan) Aisam-ul-Haq Qureshi [16] (Russia) Vera Dushevina [16]	(United States) Bob Bryan [2] (Czech Republic) Květa Peschke [2]	7–5, 6–4
Matches on No. 3 Court
Event	Winner	Loser	Score
Ladies' Doubles 3rd Round	(Hungary) Tímea Babos [14] (France) Kristina Mladenovic [14]	(Chinese Taipei) Hsieh Su-wei [1] (China) S Peng [1]	4–6, 7–6^{(7–5)}, 6–2
Gentlemen's Doubles 3rd Round	(India) Leander Paes [5] (Czech Republic) Radek Štěpánek [5]	(Netherlands) Jean-Julien Rojer [11] (Romania) Horia Tecău [11]	6–4, 6–7^{(5–7)}, 6–4, 7–5
Mixed Doubles 3rd Round	(Canada) Daniel Nestor [5] (France) Kristina Mladenovic [5]	(Australia) John Peers [12] (Australia) Ashleigh Barty [12]	7–6^{(7–4)}, 6–3
Mixed Doubles 2nd Round	(Romania) Horia Tecău [6] (India) Sania Mirza [6]	(Croatia) Mate Pavić (Serbia) Bojana Jovanovski	6–3, 6–3

=== Day 10 (3 July) ===
- Seeds out:
  - Women's Singles: (Romania) Simona Halep [3], (Czech Republic) Lucie Šafářová [23]
  - Men's Doubles: (Austria) Alexander Peya / (Brazil) Bruno Soares [2], (Canada) Daniel Nestor / (Serbia) Nenad Zimonjić [3]
  - Women's Doubles: (Australia) Ashleigh Barty / (Australia) Casey Dellacqua [6], (Russia) Alla Kudryavtseva / (Australia) Anastasia Rodionova [11]
  - Mixed Doubles: (Romania) Horia Tecău / (India) Sania Mirza [6], (Brazil) Bruno Soares / (Switzerland) Martina Hingis [13]
- Schedule

Matches on main courts
Matches on Centre Court
Event	Winner	Loser	Score
Ladies' Singles Semifinals	(Czech Republic) Petra Kvitová [6]	(Czech Republic) Lucie Šafářová [23]	7–6^{(8–6)}, 6–1
Ladies' Singles Semifinals	(Canada) Eugenie Bouchard [13]	(Romania) Simona Halep [3]	7–6^{(7–5)}, 6–2
Mixed Doubles 3rd Round	(United Kingdom) Jamie Murray [10] (Australia) Casey Dellacqua [10]	(Romania) Horia Tecău [6] (India) Sania Mirza [6]	7–5, 6–3
Mixed Doubles Quarterfinals	(Canada) Daniel Nestor [5] (France) Kristina Mladenovic [5]	(Brazil) Bruno Soares [13] (Switzerland) Martina Hingis [13]	6–4, 7–6^{(7–3)}
Matches on No. 1 Court
Event	Winner	Loser	Score
Gentlemen's Doubles Quarterfinals	(India) Leander Paes [5] (Czech Republic) Radek Štěpánek [5]	(Canada) Daniel Nestor [3] (Serbia) Nenad Zimonjić [3]	3–6, 7–6^{(7–5)}, 6–3, 6–4
Mixed Doubles 3rd Round	(United Kingdom) Neal Skupski [WC] (United Kingdom) Naomi Broady [WC]	(Romania) Florin Mergea (Ukraine) Elina Svitolina	4–6, 6–3, 6–4
Gentlemen's Invitation Round Robin	(Sweden) Jonas Björkman (Australia) Todd Woodbridge	(Croatia) Goran Ivanišević (Croatia) Ivan Ljubičić	6–4, 7–6^{(7–4)}
Matches on No. 2 Court
Event	Winner	Loser	Score
Senior Gentlemen's Invitation Round Robin	(United States) Rick Leach (Australia) Mark Woodforde	(Iran) Mansour Bahrami (France) Henri Leconte	6–3, 7–6^{(9–7)}
Gentlemen's Doubles Quarterfinals	(Canada) Vasek Pospisil (United States) Jack Sock	(Austria) Alexander Peya [2] (Brazil) Bruno Soares [2]	6–4, 3–6, 7–6^{(8–6)}, 6–4
Gentlemen's Invitation Round Robin	(Sweden) Thomas Enqvist (Australia) Mark Philippoussis	(United States) Justin Gimelstob (United Kingdom) Chris Wilkinson	6–4, 3–6, [10–4]
Ladies' Invitation Doubles Round Robin	(United States) Martina Navratilova (Tunisia) Selima Sfar	(United Kingdom) Anne Keothavong (Spain) Conchita Martínez	6–0, 6–1
Matches on No. 3 Court
Event	Winner	Loser	Score
Ladies' Doubles Quarterfinals	(Italy) Sara Errani [2] (Italy) Roberta Vinci [2]	(Australia) Ashleigh Barty [6] (Australia) Casey Dellacqua [6]	6–4, 2–6, 6–0
Ladies' Doubles Quarterfinals	(Hungary) Tímea Babos [14] (France) Kristina Mladenovic [14]	(Russia) Alla Kudryavtseva [11] (Australia) Anastasia Rodionova [11]	6–3, 3–6, 6–4
Senior Gentlemen's Invitation Round Robin	(France) Guy Forget (France) Cédric Pioline	(Spain) Sergio Casal (Sweden) Joakim Nyström	6–3, 6–2
Gentlemen's Invitation Round Robin	(United Kingdom) Greg Rusedski (France) Fabrice Santoro	(Spain) Albert Costa (Sweden) Thomas Johansson	4–6, 7–6^{(7–2)}, [10–7]
Gentlemen's Invitation Round Robin	(Netherlands) Jacco Eltingh (Netherlands) Paul Haarhuis	(South Africa) Wayne Ferreira (United Kingdom) Mark Petchey	7–5, 7–5

=== Day 11 (4 July) ===
- Seeds out:
  - Men's Singles: (Canada) Milos Raonic [8], (Bulgaria) Grigor Dimitrov [11]
  - Men's Doubles: (India) Leander Paes / (Czech Republic) Radek Štěpánek [5], (France) Michaël Llodra / (France) Nicolas Mahut [12]
  - Women's Doubles: (Czech Republic) Andrea Hlaváčková / (China) Zheng Jie [9]
  - Mixed Doubles: (United Kingdom) Jamie Murray / (Australia) Casey Dellacqua [10]
- Schedule

Matches on main courts
Matches on Centre Court
Event	Winner	Loser	Score
Gentlemen's Singles Semifinals	(Serbia) Novak Djokovic [1]	(Bulgaria) Grigor Dimitrov [11]	6–4, 3–6, 7–6^{(7–2)}, 7–6^{(9–7)}
Gentlemen's Singles Semifinals	(Switzerland) Roger Federer [4]	(Canada) Milos Raonic [8]	6–4, 6–4, 6–4
Gentlemen's Invitation Round Robin	(Croatia) Goran Ivanišević (Croatia) Ivan Ljubičić	(United States) Justin Gimelstob (United Kingdom) Chris Wilkinson	3–6, 6–1, [10–7]
Matches on No. 1 Court
Event	Winner	Loser	Score
Gentlemen's Doubles Semifinals	(United States) Bob Bryan [1] (United States) Mike Bryan [1]	(France) Michaël Llodra [12] (France) Nicolas Mahut [12]	7–6^{(7–4)}, 6–3, 6–2
Mixed Doubles Quarterfinals	(Pakistan) Aisam-ul-Haq Qureshi [16] (Russia) Vera Dushevina [16]	(United Kingdom) Neal Skupski [WC] (United Kingdom) Naomi Broady [WC]	6–4, 6–3
Senior Gentlemen's Invitation Round Robin	(Iran) Mansour Bahrami (France) Henri Leconte	(Australia) Peter McNamara (Australia) Paul McNamee	7–5, 6–4
Senior Gentlemen's Invitation Round Robin	(United States) Rick Leach (Australia) Mark Woodforde	(United States) Peter Fleming (United States) Patrick McEnroe	6–2, 6–4
Matches on No. 3 Court
Event	Winner	Loser	Score
Gentlemen's Invitation Round Robin	(Netherlands) Jacco Eltingh (Netherlands) Paul Haarhuis	(United Kingdom) Greg Rusedski (France) Fabrice Santoro	6–3, 6–4
Gentlemen's Doubles Semifinals	(Canada) Vasek Pospisil (United States) Jack Sock	(India) Leander Paes [5] (Czech Republic) Radek Štěpánek [5]	7–6^{(7–5)}, 6–3, 6–4
Ladies' Invitation Round Robin	(United States) Andrea Jaeger (Australia) Rennae Stubbs	(France) Nathalie Tauziat (Hungary) Andrea Temesvári	7–5, 6–2
Gentlemen's Invitation Round Robin	(Sweden) Thomas Enqvist (Australia) Mark Philippoussis	(Sweden) Jonas Björkman (Australia) Todd Woodbridge	6–3, 7–6^{(7–5)}

=== Day 12 (5 July) ===
- Seeds out:
  - Women's Singles: (Canada) Eugenie Bouchard [13]
  - Men's Doubles: (United States) Bob Bryan / (United States) Mike Bryan [1]
  - Women's Doubles: (Hungary) Tímea Babos / (France) Kristina Mladenovic [14]
  - Mixed Doubles: (Canada) Daniel Nestor / (France) Kristina Mladenovic [5], (Pakistan) Aisam-ul-Haq Qureshi / (Russia) Vera Dushevina [16]
- Schedule

Matches on main courts
Matches on Centre Court
Event	Winner	Loser	Score
Ladies' Singles Final	(Czech Republic) Petra Kvitová [6]	(Canada) Eugenie Bouchard [13]	6–3, 6–0
Ladies' Doubles Final	(Italy) Sara Errani [2] (Italy) Roberta Vinci [2]	(Hungary) Tímea Babos [14] (France) Kristina Mladenovic [14]	6–1, 6–3
Gentlemen's Doubles Final	(Canada) Vasek Pospisil (United States) Jack Sock	(United States) Bob Bryan [1] (United States) Mike Bryan [1]	7–6^{(7–5)}, 6–7^{(3–7)}, 6–4, 3–6, 7–5
Matches on No. 1 Court
Event	Winner	Loser	Score
Senior Gentlemen's Invitation Round Robin	(United Kingdom) Andrew Castle (Sweden) Mikael Pernfors	(Spain) Sergio Casal (Sweden) Joakim Nyström	5–2, ret.
Mixed Doubles Semifinals	(Serbia) Nenad Zimonjić [15] (Australia) Samantha Stosur [15]	(Pakistan) Aisam-ul-Haq Qureshi [16] (Russia) Vera Dushevina [16]	7–5, 6–2
Gentlemen's Invitation Round Robin	(Sweden) Thomas Enqvist (Australia) Mark Philippoussis	(Croatia) Goran Ivanišević (Croatia) Ivan Ljubičić	6–4, 6–7^{(6–8)}, [10–5]
Mixed Doubles Semifinals	(Belarus) Max Mirnyi [14] (Chinese Taipei) Chan Hao-ching [14]	(Canada) Daniel Nestor [5] (France) Kristina Mladenovic [5]	7–6^{(7–4)}, 7–5
Matches on No. 3 Court
Event	Winner	Loser	Score
Boys' Singles Semifinals	(United States) Stefan Kozlov	(France) Johan Tatlot	6–3, 7–6^{(9–7)}

=== Day 13 (6 July) ===
- Seeds out:
  - Men's Singles: (Switzerland) Roger Federer [4]
  - Mixed Doubles: (Belarus) Max Mirnyi / (Chinese Taipei) Chan Hao-ching [14]
- Schedule

Matches on main courts
Matches on Centre Court
Event	Winner	Loser	Score
Gentlemen's Singles Final	(Serbia) Novak Djokovic [1]	(Switzerland) Roger Federer [4]	6–7^{(7–9)}, 6–4, 7–6^{(7–4)}, 5–7, 6–4
Mixed Doubles Final	(Serbia) Nenad Zimonjić [15] (Australia) Samantha Stosur [15]	(Belarus) Max Mirnyi [14] (Chinese Taipei) Chan Hao-ching [14]	6–4, 6–2
Matches on No. 1 Court
Event	Winner	Loser	Score
Boys' Singles Final	(United States) Noah Rubin [Q]	(United States) Stefan Kozlov [6]	6–4, 4–6, 6–3
Girls' Singles Final	(Latvia) Jeļena Ostapenko	(Slovakia) Kristína Schmiedlová [8]	2–6, 6–3, 6–0
Senior Gentlemen's Invitation Final	(France) Guy Forget (France) Cédric Pioline	(United States) Rick Leach (Australia) Mark Woodforde	6–4, 6–3
