= 2019 Davis Cup Asia/Oceania Zone Group II =

International tennis competition

The Asia/Oceania Zone was one of the three regional zones of the 2019 Davis Cup.

== Participating nations ==
Seeds:

1. Thailand
2. New Zealand
3. Chinese Taipei

Remaining nations:

- Hong Kong
- Indonesia
- Philippines

== Results summary ==
Home team	Score	Away team	Location	Venue	Surface
Thailand [1]	3–1	Philippines	Nonthaburi	National Tennis Development Centre	Hard
Indonesia	1–3	New Zealand [2]	Jakarta	Gelora Bung Karno Sports Complex	Hard
Hong Kong	0–4	Chinese Taipei [3]	Hong Kong	Victoria Park Tennis Stadium	Hard

== Results ==
=== Thailand vs. Philippines ===
Thailand
3
National Tennis Development Centre, Nonthaburi, Thailand
5–6 April 2019
Hard

Philippines
1

			1	2	3
1	(Thailand) (Philippines)	Palaphoom Kovapitukted; Jeson Patrombon	6; 3	2; 6	6; 4
2	(Thailand) (Philippines)	Wishaya Trongcharoenchaikul; Alberto Lim	6; 4	7^{7} 6^{4}
3	(Thailand) (Philippines)	Sanchai Ratiwatana / Sonchat Ratiwatana; Francis Alcantara / Jurence Zosimo Mendoza	6; 4	7; 5
4	(Thailand) (Philippines)	Kasidit Samrej; John Bryan Decasa Otico	6; 4	3; 6	6; 7	retired
5	(Thailand) (Philippines)	Palaphoom Kovapitukted; Alberto Lim				not played

=== Indonesia vs. New Zealand ===
Indonesia
1
Gelora Bung Karno Sports Complex, Jakarta, Indonesia
14–15 September 2019
Hard

New Zealand
3

			1	2	3
1	(Indonesia) (New Zealand)	Muhammad Rifqi Fitriadi; Ajeet Rai	6^{7} 7^{9}	3; 6
2	(Indonesia) (New Zealand)	David Agung Susanto; Rhett Purcell	6; 3	4; 6	0; 6
3	(Indonesia) (New Zealand)	Anthony Susanto / David Agung Susanto; Marcus Daniell / Michael Venus	0; 6	3; 6
4	(Indonesia) (New Zealand)	Ari Fahresi; Ajeet Rai	6; 3	2; 6	10; 7
5	(Indonesia) (New Zealand)	Muhammad Rifqi Fitriadi; Rhett Purcell				not played

=== Hong Kong vs. Chinese Taipei ===
Hong Kong
0
Victoria Park Tennis Stadium, Hong Kong
14–15 September 2019
Hard

Chinese Taipei
4

			1	2	3
1	(Hong Kong) (Chinese Taipei)	Chak Lam Coleman Wong; Jason Jung	1; 6	2; 6
2	(Hong Kong) (Chinese Taipei)	Yeung Pak-long; Wu Tung-lin	3; 6	2; 6
3	(Hong Kong) (Chinese Taipei)	Wong Hong-kit / Yeung Pak-long; Hsieh Cheng-peng / Yang Tsung-hua	3; 6	2; 6
4	(Hong Kong) (Chinese Taipei)	Kai Wai-yu; Tseng Chun-hsin	2; 6	5; 7
5	(Hong Kong) (Chinese Taipei)	Chak Lam Coleman Wong; Wu Tung-lin				not played
