= Rhett Purcell =

New Zealand tennis player (born 1996)

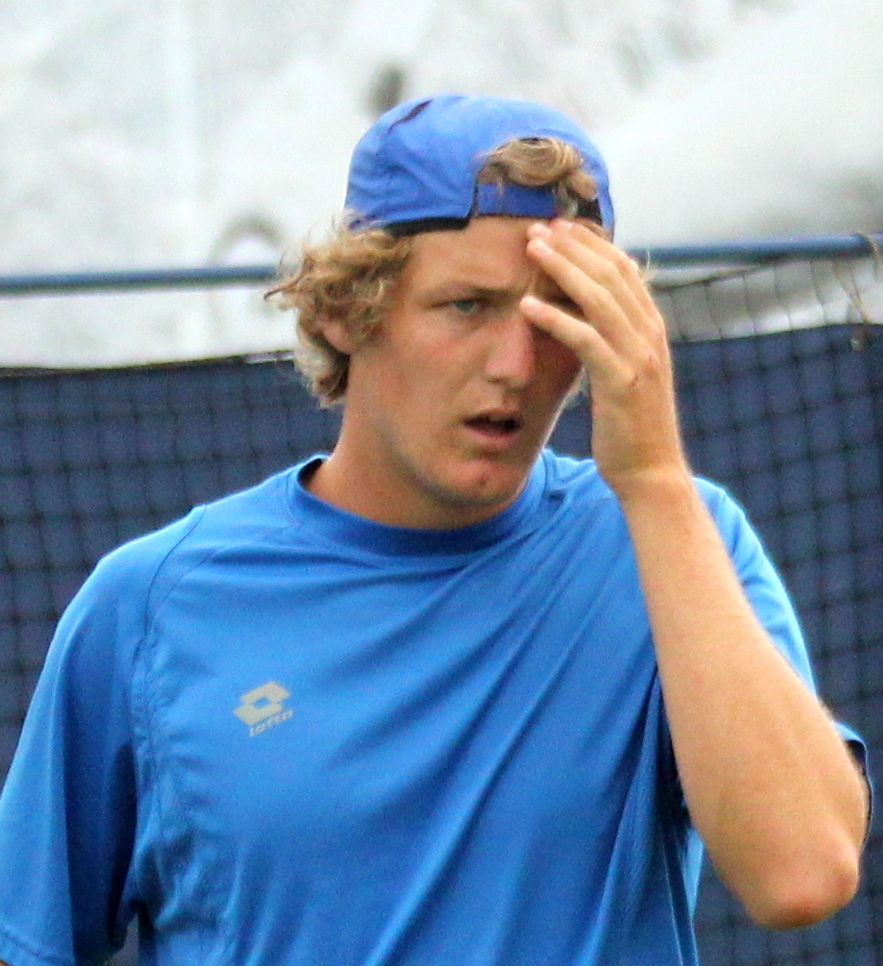
- Purcell in 2014
- Country (sports): New Zealand (21 Oct 2017–present); United Kingdom (2010–Oct 2017)
- Residence: New Zealand
- Born: February 6, 1996 (age 30) Gisborne, New Zealand
- Height: 1.93 m (6 ft 4 in)
- Plays: Right-handed (two-handed backhand)
- Prize money: $35,900

Singles
- Career record: 1–0 (at ATP Tour level, Grand Slam level, and in Davis Cup)
- Career titles: 1 ITF
- Highest ranking: No. 749 (10 September 2018)

Grand Slam singles results
- Wimbledon Junior: 1R (2014)

Doubles
- Career record: 0–1 (at ATP Tour level, Grand Slam level, and in Davis Cup)
- Career titles: 5 ITF
- Highest ranking: No. 382 (19 August 2019)

Grand Slam doubles results
- Wimbledon Junior: 1R (2014)

Team competitions
- Davis Cup: 1–0 (Singles 1-0, Doubles 0-0)

Rhett Purcell (born 6 February 1996) is a New Zealand tennis player, although he represented the United Kingdom through parental descent from the start of his junior career in 2010 until mid-October 2017.

Purcell has a career high ATP singles ranking of No. 749 achieved on 10 September 2018 and a best doubles ranking of No. 382 reached on 19 August 2019. He made his debut for New Zealand at the Davis Cup in September 2019, winning his first match.

On 6 November 2025, Purcell scored 94 runs from 41 balls in a losing cause against Morning Parore in an Auckland Last Man Stands cricket match.

== Tennis career ==
=== 2014 ===
Purcell's first experience of professional tennis was being given a wild card into qualifying for the 2014 ASB Classic in Auckland, where he beat Eric Sock (elder brother of Jack) in the first round, but lost heavily to subsequent French Open doubles winner Michael Venus in the second. This was also his final year as a junior, and he won both singles and doubles titles at the NZ ITF Junior Summer Championships the following month. Stepping up to Grade 1 just a few weeks later, he and fellow New Zealander Alex Klintcharov won the doubles title at the 25th Mitsubishi-Lancer International in Manila, and he was the beaten finalist in the singles.

He followed that with a Grade 2 doubles win in Italy before playing his only two Grade 1 events in Europe. The first was the Nike Junior International at Roehampton, where he lost to Daniil Medvedev in the first round. He concluded his junior career with his only Grand Slam tournament, losing a very tight three set match in the first round of singles at Wimbledon to Alex Rybakov and another tight match in the first round of doubles.

=== 2015–16 ===
Purcell qualified for his first senior main draw at an ITF Futures tournament in Anning, China, in April 2015, but lost in the first round. His first main draw win wasn't until March 2016, again in Anning. The first tournament where he got past the first round was in Thủ Dầu Một, Vietnam, the following October. He made it all the way to the semi-finals before losing to Masato Shiga from Japan.

=== 2017 ===
Purcell was again given a wild card entry into qualifying for the ASB Classic in Auckland, losing in the first round to fellow New Zealander Rubin Statham. He won his first ITF Futures doubles title just four weeks later, with a walkover victory in Jakarta when partnered by Aaron Addison. Whilst very active through the remainder of the year, playing almost every week, he made no more finals. He did, however, change his representative nationality back to New Zealand, his first tournament under that flag being an ATP Challenger event at Traralgon in Victoria, Australia, on 21 October.

=== 2018 ===
Purcell's second ITF doubles title came in Luzhou, China, early in June 2018, this time with Sami Reinwein. Anning continued to be the scene of milestones for Purcell, the next one when he followed being runner-up in the doubles final with victory the following day in the singles, beating Zheng Weigiang in the final. A week later, at the same venue, he added another doubles title, this time with another New Zealander, Olly Sadler.

=== 2019 ===
Taking a much longer break than in previous years, Purcell began his new season in Australia in March, but it wasn't until he returned to China that he tasted more tournament success. His next doubles title came in Shenzhen in June, with yet another partner in Wang Aoran. A few weeks later he and Francis Casey Alcantara were runners-up in Qujing, but another title wasn't to be long delayed. He and Luca Castelnuovo won in Jakarta, and were beaten in the semi-finals there a week later.

Purcell's singles fortunes had taken quite a dip over the previous few months, but he rebounded somewhat with a semi-finals appearance in his third week in Jakarta. Although at a different venue within the city, Jakarta would also be the scene of his Davis Cup winning debut for New Zealand a few weeks later. His remaining tournaments for the year all saw first round exits in singles, but he and Vladyslav Orlov reached the doubles final in Cairns in September. Purcell finished his season in Brisbane two weeks later.

=== 2020 ===
The ITF tour had its first tournaments in New Zealand for several years early in 2020, with the men's event in Te Anau being the first of the new season. Eliminated in the second round of singles, Purcell and Calum Puttergill were the second seeds in the doubles, losing to top seeds Luca Margaroli and Andrea Vavassori in the final after saving a match point in the deciding tie-break. Purcell was unlucky enough to draw former World No. 21 Leonardo Mayer in his first round qualifying singles match in Auckland, losing in three sets. Given a wild card into the doubles with Cameron Norrie, they drew third seeds Rohan Bopanna and Henri Kontinen first up, and lost in straight sets.

Purcell reached the second round of singles in both his remaining tournaments in Australia before the Covid-19 coronavirus caused the suspension of the international tours, and didn't play any further international events before the end of the year.

In late 2025 Purcell played a practice match against Rich Mills.

== ITF Circuit finals ==
=== Singles: 1 (1 title) ===
| Legend $100,000 tournaments (0–0) $80,000 tournaments (0–0) $60,000 tournaments (0–0) $25,000 tournaments (0–0) $15,000 tournaments (1–0) | Finals by surface Hard (0–0) Clay (1–0) Grass (0–0) Carpet (0–0) |

| Result | No. | Date | Level | Tournament | Surface | Opponent | Score |
|---|---|---|---|---|---|---|---|
| Winner | 1. | 19 August 2018 | $15,000 | Anning, China | Clay | (China) Zheng Weigiang | 7–6^{(7–4)}, 6–2 |

=== Doubles: 9 (5 titles, 4 runners-up) ===
Legend
$100,000 tournaments (0–0)
$80,000 tournaments (0–0)
$60,000 tournaments (0–0)
$25,000 tournaments (1–2)
$15,000 tournaments (4–2)

Finals by surface
Hard (3–3)
Clay (1–1)
Grass (0–0)
Carpet (0–0)

Note: one win by walkover

| Result | No. | Date | Level | Tournament | Surface | Partner | Opponents | Score |
|---|---|---|---|---|---|---|---|---|
| Winner | 1. | 12 February 2017 | $15,000 | Jakarta, Indonesia | Hard | (Australia) Aaron Addison | (India) Karunuday Singh (Canada) Kelsey Stevenson | Walkover |
| Winner | 2. | 1 June 2018 | $15,000 | Luzhou, China | Hard | (Germany) Sami Reinwein | (Philippines) Francis Casey Alcantara (China) Sun Fajing | 7–5, 6–3 |
| Runner-up | 1. | 17 August 2018 | $15,000 | Anning, China | Clay | (Australia) Jeremy Beale | (China) Wang Aoran (China) Wu Hao | 6–7^{(4–7)}, 6–3, [10–12] |
| Winner | 3. | 24 August 2018 | $15,000 | Anning, China | Clay | (New Zealand) Olly Sadler | (India) Anirudh Chandrasekar (India) Vignesh Peranamallur | 6–3, 6–2 |
| Winner | 4. | 15 June 2019 | $25,000 | Shenzhen, China | Hard | (China) Wang Aoran | (China) Gao Qun (China) Wang Ruikai | 6–3, 7–5 |
| Runner-up | 2. | 13 July 2019 | $25,000 | Qujing, China | Hard (i) | (Philippines) Francis Casey Alcantara | (China) Hua Runhao (China) Sun Fajing | 1–6, 1–6 |
| Winner | 5. | 10 August 2019 | $15,000 | Jakarta, Indonesia | Hard | (Switzerland) Luca Castelnuovo | (United States) Dusty Boyer (Hong Kong) Yeung Pak Long | 7–6^{(7–4)}, 6–4 |
| Runner-up | 3. | 20 September 2019 | $25,000 | Cairns, Australia | Hard | (Ukraine) Vladyslav Orlov | (Australia) Calum Puttergill (Australia) Brandon Walkin | 4–6, 7–5, [5–10] |
| Runner-up | 4. | 4 January 2020 | $15,000 | Te Anau, New Zealand | Hard | (Australia) Calum Puttergill | (Switzerland) Luca Margaroli (Italy) Andrea Vavassori | 5–7, 7–6^{(7–2)}, [8–10] |

== Davis Cup (1) ==
Group membership
World Group (0)
Group I (0)
Group II (1–0)
Group III (0)
Group IV (0)

- ▲ ▼ indicates the outcome of the Davis Cup match followed by the score, date, place of event, the zonal classification and its phase, and the court surface.

| Rubber outcome | No. | Rubber | Match type (partner if any) | Opponent nation | Opponent player(s) | Score |
▲3–1; 14-15 September 2019; Gelora Bung Karno Sports Complex, Jakarta, Indonesia; Asia/Oceania Zone Group II playoffs (first round); hard surface
| Victory | 1. | II | Singles | Indonesia | David Agung Susanto | 3–6, 6–4, 6–0 |
