= Kristína Schmiedlová =

Slovak tennis player

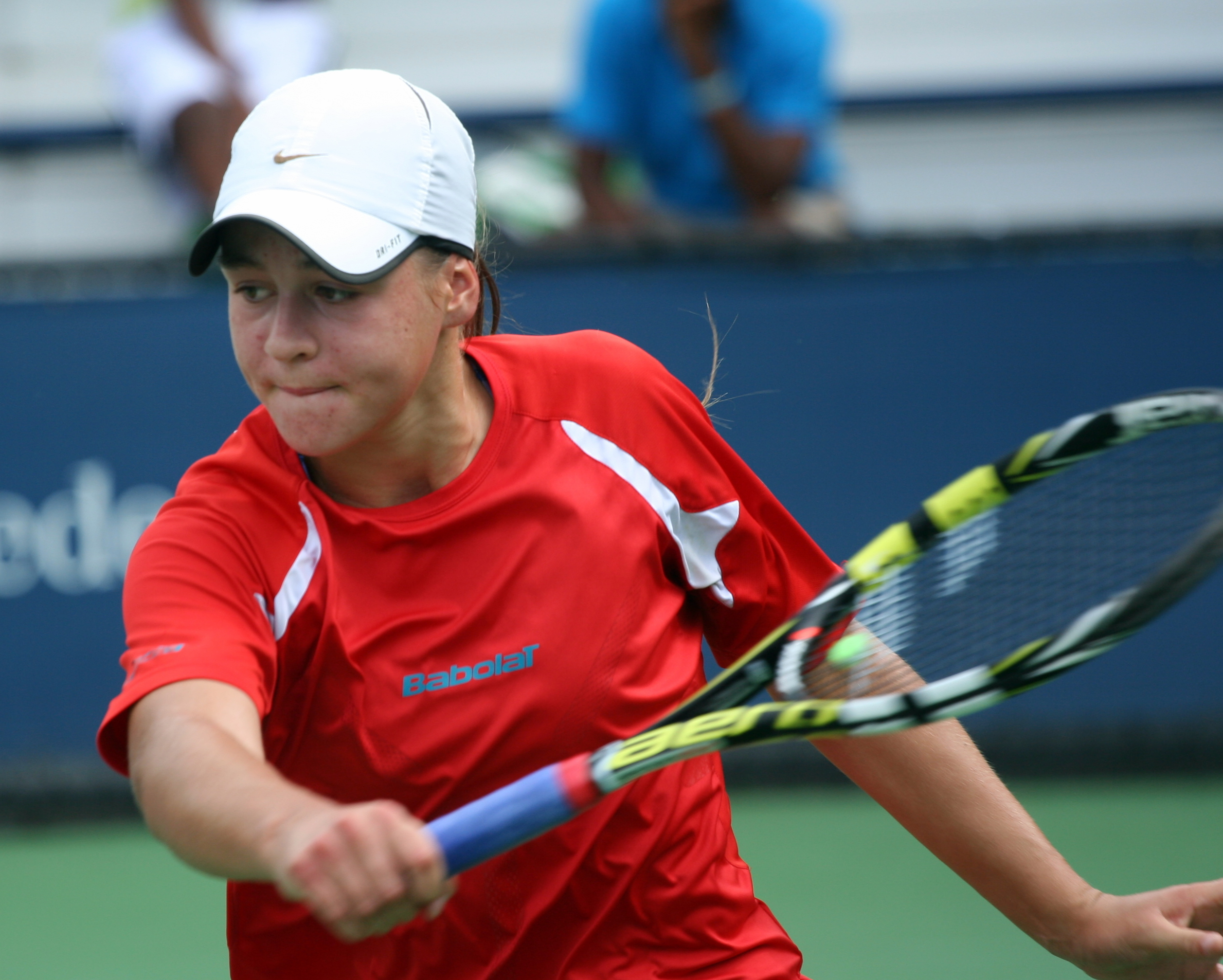
- Schmiedlová at the 2013 US Open
- Country (sports): Slovakia
- Born: 6 August 1997 (age 27); Košice, Slovakia
- Plays: Right (two-handed backhand)
- Prize money: $30,944

Singles
- Career record: 111–73
- Career titles: 2 ITF
- Highest ranking: No. 412 (13 July 2015)

Grand Slam singles results
- French Open Junior: QF (2013, 2014)
- Wimbledon Junior: F (2014)
- US Open Junior: 1R (2013, 2014)

Doubles
- Career record: 17–17
- Career titles: 0
- Highest ranking: No. 507 (25 April 2016)

Grand Slam doubles results
- French Open Junior: 1R (2014)
- Wimbledon Junior: 2R (2013, 2014)
- US Open Junior: SF (2014)

Kristína Schmiedlová (Slovak pronunciation: [ˈkristiːna ˈʂmiːdlɔʋaː]; born 6 August 1997) is a Slovak former tennis player. Her older sister Anna Karolína Schmiedlová is an active tennis player.

Schmiedlová won two singles titles on the ITF Circuit. On 13 July 2015, she reached her best singles ranking of world No. 412. On 25 April 2016, she peaked at No. 507 in the WTA doubles rankings.

As a junior, Schmiedlová reached the final of the 2014 Wimbledon Girls' Singles Championship, where she lost to future French Open winner Jeļena Ostapenko.

Playing for Slovakia at the Fed Cup, Schmiedlová has a win–loss record of 0–1.

Her last match on the circuit has been in February 2018 when she lost in the final qualification round of an ITF event in Grenoble, France.

== ITF Circuit finals ==
=== Singles (2–4) ===
Legend $25,000 tournaments $10,000 tournaments	Finals by surface Hard (1–1) Clay (1–3)

Outcome	No.	Date	Tournament	Surface	Opponent	Score
Runner-up	1.	10 November 2014	ITF Antalya, Turkey	Clay	(Croatia) Nina Alibalić	3–6, 0–6
Winner	1.	17 November 2014	ITF Antalya, Turkey	Clay	(Romania) Irina Bara	6–3, 6–2
Winner	2.	23 February 2015	ITF Port El Kantaoui, Tunisia	Hard	(Czech Republic) Tereza Malíková	7–5, 6–2
Runner-up	2.	25 May 2015	Grado Tennis Cup, Italy	Clay	(Poland) Katarzyna Piter	3–6, 0–6
Runner-up	3.	29 August 2016	ITF Sankt Pölten, Austria	Clay	(Slovakia) Lenka Juríková	2–6, 4–6
Runner-up	4.	31 October 2016	ITF Stockholm, Sweden	Hard (i)	(Bulgaria) Isabella Shinikova	2–6, 4–6

=== Doubles (0–1) ===
Outcome	No.	Date	Tournament	Surface	Partner	Opponents	Score
Runner-up	1.	11 April 2016	ITF Pula, Italy	Clay	(Hungary) Vanda Lukács	(Italy) Alice Balducci (Spain) Olga Parres Azcoitia	6–3, 2–6, [6–10]

== Junior Grand Slam finals ==
=== Girls' singles ===
Outcome	Year	Championship	Surface	Opponent	Score
Runner-up	2014	Wimbledon	Grass	(Latvia) Jeļena Ostapenko	6–2, 3–6, 0–6
