= 2014 Wimbledon Championships – Wheelchair men's doubles =

Wheelchair men's doubles
- 2014 Wimbledon Championships

Final
- Champions: (France) Stéphane Houdet (Japan) Shingo Kunieda
- Runners-up: (Netherlands) Maikel Scheffers (Netherlands) Ronald Vink
- Score: 5–7, 6–0, 6–3

Events
Singles	men	women		boys	girls
Doubles	men	women	mixed	boys	girls
WC Singles	men	women	quad
WC Doubles	men	women	quad
Legends	men	women	seniors
← 2013 ·	Wimbledon Championships	· 2015 →

Defending champions Stéphane Houdet and Shingo Kunieda defeated Maikel Scheffers and Ronald Vink in the final, 5–7, 6–0, 6–3 to win the gentlemen's doubles wheelchair tennis title at the 2014 Wimbledon Championships. It was Houdet's third step towards a Grand Slam.

== Seeds ==
1. (France) Stéphane Houdet / (Japan) Shingo Kunieda (champions)
2. (Netherlands) Maikel Scheffers / (Netherlands) Ronald Vink (final)

== Draw ==
=== Key ===
- Q = Qualifier
- WC = Wild card
- LL = Lucky loser
- Alt = Alternate
- ITF = ITF entry
- PR = Protected ranking
- SR = Special ranking
- SE = Special exempt
- JE = Junior exempt
- JR = Junior Accelerator Programme entrant
- CO = College Accelerator Programme entrant
- NG = Next Gen Accelerator Program entrant
- w/o = Walkover
- r = Retired
- d = Defaulted

=== Finals ===
Semifinals
1	(France) Stéphane Houdet (Japan) Shingo Kunieda	1	6	6
(Netherlands) Tom Egberink (United Kingdom) Gordon Reid	6	4	2
(France) Frédéric Cattaneo (Belgium) Joachim Gérard	3	6^{2}
2	(Netherlands) Maikel Scheffers (Netherlands) Ronald Vink	6	7^{7}

Final
1	(France) Stéphane Houdet (Japan) Shingo Kunieda	5	6	6
2	(Netherlands) Maikel Scheffers (Netherlands) Ronald Vink	7	0	3
Third place
(Netherlands) Tom Egberink (United Kingdom) Gordon Reid	6	6
(France) Frédéric Cattaneo (Belgium) Joachim Gérard	2	4
