= 2014 Wimbledon Championships – Boys' doubles =

Boys' doubles
- 2014 Wimbledon Championships

Final
- Champions: (Brazil) Orlando Luz (Brazil) Marcelo Zormann
- Runners-up: (United States) Stefan Kozlov (Russia) Andrey Rublev
- Score: 6–4, 3–6, 8–6

Events
| Singles | men | women | | boys | girls |
| Doubles | men | women | mixed | boys | girls |
| WC Singles | men | women | quad |
| WC Doubles | men | women | quad |
| Legends | men | women | seniors |
- Wimbledon Championships

Thanasi Kokkinakis and Nick Kyrgios were the defending champions, but were no longer eligible to compete in junior tennis.

Orlando Luz and Marcelo Zormann defeated Stefan Kozlov and Andrey Rublev in the final, 6–4, 3–6, 8–6 to win the boys' doubles tennis title at the 2014 Wimbledon Championships.

== Seeds ==
1. (United States) Stefan Kozlov / (Russia) Andrey Rublev (final)
2. (France) Quentin Halys / (France) Johan Tatlot (quarterfinals)
3. (Brazil) Orlando Luz / (Brazil) Marcelo Zormann (champions)
4. (United States) Michael Mmoh / (United States) Frances Tiafoe (second round)
5. (Spain) Pedro Martínez / (Spain) Jaume Munar (quarterfinals)
6. (Argentina) Francisco Behamonde / (Argentina) Matías Zukas (second round)
7. (Cyprus) Petros Chrysochos / (Croatia) Nino Serdarušić (semifinals)
8. (Poland) Kamil Majchrzak / (Poland) Jan Zieliński (first round)

== Draw ==
Key

- Q = Qualifier
- WC = Wild card
- LL = Lucky loser
- Alt = Alternate
- ITF = ITF entry
- PR = Protected ranking
- SR = Special ranking
- SE = Special exempt
- JE = Junior exempt
- JR = Junior Accelerator Programme entrant
- CO = College Accelerator Programme entrant
- NG = Next Gen Accelerator Program entrant
- w/o = Walkover
- r = Retired
- d = Defaulted

=== Finals ===
Semifinals
1 | (United States) Stefan Kozlov (Russia) Andrey Rublev | 6 | 7
7 | (Cyprus) Petros Chrysochos (Croatia) Nino Serdarušić | 2 | 5
3 | (Brazil) Orlando Luz (Brazil) Marcelo Zormann | 6 | 5 | 6
(Japan) Naoki Nakagawa (Netherlands) Tim van Rijthoven | 3 | 7 | 2

Final
1 | (United States) Stefan Kozlov (Russia) Andrey Rublev | 4 | 6 | 6
3 | (Brazil) Orlando Luz (Brazil) Marcelo Zormann | 6 | 3 | 8

=== Top half ===
First round
1 | (United States) Stefan Kozlov (Russia) Andrey Rublev | 7 | 7
(South Korea) Chung Yun-seong (United States) Alex Rybakov | 5 | 5
(Germany) Jan Choinski (Poland) Hubert Hurkacz | 5 | 6 | 6
(South Korea) Hong Seong-chan (South Korea) Kang Ku-keon | 7 | 3 | 2
(Italy) Filippo Baldi (Austria) Lucas Miedler | 6 | 6
(South Korea) Lee Duck-hee (Denmark) Simon Friis Søndergaard | 2 | 1
WC | (United Kingdom) Joel Cannell (United Kingdom) Max Stewart | 3 | 4
6 | (Argentina) Francisco Bahamonde (Argentina) Matías Zukas | 6 | 6
4 | (United States) Michael Mmoh (United States) Frances Tiafoe | 6 | 6
(Russia) Bogdan Bobrov (United States) Dennis Uspensky | 4 | 4
(Italy) Matteo Berrettini (Italy) Andrea Pellegrino | 1 | 2
(Brazil) Rafael Matos (Brazil) João Menezes | 6 | 6
(Australia) Harry Bourchier (Australia) Marc Polmans | 6 | 7
(Argentina) Jordi Arconada (Serbia) Petar Čonkić | 4 | 5
WC | (United Kingdom) Jamie Malik (United Kingdom) Rhett Purcell | 4 | 6 | 3
7 | (Cyprus) Petros Chrysochos (Croatia) Nino Serdarušić | 6 | 3 | 6

Second round
1 | (United States) S Kozlov (Russia) A Rublev | 7^{7} | 6
(Germany) J Choinski (Poland) H Hurkacz | 6^{4} | 2
(Italy) F Baldi (Austria) L Miedler | 6^{9} | 6 | 6
6 | (Argentina) F Bahamonde (Argentina) M Zukas | 7^{11} | 3 | 2
4 | (United States) M Mmoh (United States) F Tiafoe | 1 | 6^{14}
(Brazil) R Matos (Brazil) J Menezes | 6 | 7^{16}
(Australia) H Bourchier (Australia) M Polmans | 4 | 6 | 4
7 | (Cyprus) P Chrysochos (Croatia) N Serdarušić | 6 | 1 | 6

Quarterfinals
1 | (United States) S Kozlov (Russia) A Rublev | 7^{7} | 6
(Italy) F Baldi (Austria) L Miedler | 6^{5} | 2
(Brazil) R Matos (Brazil) J Menezes | 2 | 7^{7} | 7
7 | (Cyprus) P Chrysochos (Croatia) N Serdarušić | 6 | 6^{1} | 9

Semifinals
1 | (United States) S Kozlov (Russia) A Rublev | 6 | 7
7 | (Cyprus) P Chrysochos (Croatia) N Serdarušić | 2 | 5

=== Bottom half ===
First round
5 | (Spain) Pedro Martínez (Spain) Jaume Munar | 6 | 4 | 6
(South Africa) Lloyd Harris (Peru) Pedro Iamachkine | 1 | 6 | 3
(Australia) Omar Jasika (Peru) Juan José Rosas | 7^{7} | 5 | 4
(Sweden) Daniel Appelgren (Czech Republic) David Poljak | 6^{5} | 7 | 6
(Peru) Nicolás Álvarez (United States) Henrik Wiersholm | 7^{7} | 6
(United States) Taylor Fritz (United States) Logan Smith | 6^{5} | 2
WC | (United Kingdom) Julian Cash (United Kingdom) Alexander Sendegeya | 2 | 7^{7} | 3
3 | (Brazil) Orlando Luz (Brazil) Marcelo Zormann | 6 | 6^{5} | 6
8 | (Poland) Kamil Majchrzak (Poland) Jan Zieliński | 6^{3} | 3
(Russia) Daniil Medvedev (Australia) Akira Santillan | 7^{7} | 6
WC | (United Kingdom) Jay Clarke (United Kingdom) Marcus Walters | 1 | 6 | 0
(Japan) Naoki Nakagawa (Netherlands) Tim van Rijthoven | 6 | 3 | 6
(Japan) Ryotaro Matsumura (Japan) Jumpei Yamasaki | 6^{5} | 6 | 6
(Romania) Bogdan Ionuț Apostol (Romania) Nicolae Frunză | 7^{7} | 4 | 3
(Slovakia) Martin Blaško (Slovakia) Alex Molčan | w/o
2 | (France) Quentin Halys (France) Johan Tatlot

Second round
5 | (Spain) P Martínez (Spain) J Munar | 6^{4} | 7^{7} | 6
(Sweden) D Appelgren (Czech Republic) D Poljak | 7^{7} | 6^{5} | 3
(Peru) N Álvarez (United States) H Wiersholm | 2 | 4
3 | (Brazil) O Luz (Brazil) M Zormann | 6 | 6
(Russia) D Medvedev (Australia) A Santillan | w/o
(Japan) N Nakagawa (Netherlands) T van Rijthoven
(Japan) R Matsumura (Japan) J Yamasaki | 4 | 6^{3}
2 | (France) Q Halys (France) J Tatlot | 6 | 7^{7}

Quarterfinals
5 | (Spain) P Martínez (Spain) J Munar | 3 | 3
3 | (Brazil) O Luz (Brazil) M Zormann | 6 | 6
(Japan) N Nakagawa (Netherlands) T van Rijthoven | 6 | 7^{9}
2 | (France) Q Halys (France) J Tatlot | 3 | 6^{7}

Semifinals
3 | (Brazil) O Luz (Brazil) M Zormann | 6 | 5 | 6
(Japan) N Nakagawa (Netherlands) T van Rijthoven | 3 | 7 | 2
