= 2014 Wimbledon Championships – Wheelchair women's doubles =

Wheelchair women's doubles
- 2014 Wimbledon Championships

Final
- Champions: (Japan) Yui Kamiji (United Kingdom) Jordanne Whiley
- Runners-up: (Netherlands) Jiske Griffioen (Netherlands) Aniek van Koot
- Score: 2–6, 6–2, 7–5

Events
Singles	men	women		boys	girls
Doubles	men	women	mixed	boys	girls
WC Singles	men	women	quad
WC Doubles	men	women	quad
Legends	men	women	seniors
← 2013 ·	Wimbledon Championships	· 2015 →

Yui Kamiji and Jordanne Whiley defeated the two-time defending champions Jiske Griffioen and Aniek van Koot in the final, 6–2, 2–6, 5–7 to win the ladies' doubles wheelchair tennis title at the 2014 Wimbledon Championships. It was their third step towards an eventual Grand Slam.

== Seeds ==
1. (Japan) Yui Kamiji / (United Kingdom) Jordanne Whiley (champions)
2. (Netherlands) Jiske Griffioen / (Netherlands) Aniek van Koot (final)

== Draw ==
=== Key ===
- Q = Qualifier
- WC = Wild card
- LL = Lucky loser
- Alt = Alternate
- ITF = ITF entry
- PR = Protected ranking
- SR = Special ranking
- SE = Special exempt
- JE = Junior exempt
- JR = Junior Accelerator Programme entrant
- CO = College Accelerator Programme entrant
- NG = Next Gen Accelerator Program entrant
- w/o = Walkover
- r = Retired
- d = Defaulted

=== Finals ===
Semifinals
1	(Japan) Yui Kamiji (United Kingdom) Jordanne Whiley	6	6
(Germany) Katharina Krüger (Netherlands) Sharon Walraven	0	2
(Germany) Sabine Ellerbrock (United Kingdom) Lucy Shuker	1	0
2	(Netherlands) Jiske Griffioen (Netherlands) Aniek van Koot	6	6

Final
1	(Japan) Yui Kamiji (United Kingdom) Jordanne Whiley	2	6	7
2	(Netherlands) Jiske Griffioen (Netherlands) Aniek van Koot	6	2	5
Third place
(Germany) Katharina Krüger (Netherlands) Sharon Walraven	3	4
(Germany) Sabine Ellerbrock (United Kingdom) Lucy Shuker	6	6
