= 2014 Wimbledon Championships – Girls' doubles =

Girls' doubles
- 2014 Wimbledon Championships

Final
- Champions: (Indonesia) Tami Grende (China) Ye Qiuyu
- Runners-up: (Czech Republic) Marie Bouzková (Hungary) Dalma Gálfi
- Score: 6–2, 7–6^{(7–5)}

Events
Singles	men	women		boys	girls
Doubles	men	women	mixed	boys	girls
WC Singles	men	women	quad
WC Doubles	men	women	quad
Legends	men	women	seniors
← 2013 ·	Wimbledon Championships	· 2015 →

Barbora Krejčíková and Kateřina Siniaková were the defending champions, however were no longer eligible to compete in junior tennis.

Tami Grende and Ye Qiuyu defeated Marie Bouzková and Dalma Gálfi in the final, 6–2, 7–6^{(7–5)} to win the girls' doubles tennis title at the 2014 Wimbledon Championships.

== Seeds ==
1. (Ukraine) Anhelina Kalinina / (Belarus) Iryna Shymanovich (quarterfinals)
2. (Australia) Priscilla Hon / (Switzerland) Jil Teichmann (semifinals)
3. (Australia) Naiktha Bains / (United States) Tornado Alicia Black (quarterfinals)
4. (United Kingdom) Katie Boulter / (Serbia) Ivana Jorović (quarterfinals)
5. (Spain) Paula Badosa Gibert / (Spain) Aliona Bolsova Zadoinov (first round)
6. (Croatia) Jana Fett / (Romania) Ioana Loredana Roșca (first round)
7. (Czech Republic) Simona Heinová / (Czech Republic) Markéta Vondroušová (withdrew)
8. (Slovakia) Viktória Kužmová / (Slovakia) Kristína Schmiedlová (second round)

== Draw ==
=== Key ===
- Q = Qualifier
- WC = Wild card
- LL = Lucky loser
- Alt = Alternate
- SE = Special exempt
- PR = Protected ranking
- ITF = ITF entry
- JE = Junior exempt
- w/o = Walkover
- r = Retired
- d = Defaulted
- SR = Special ranking

=== Finals ===
Semifinals
(Indonesia) Tami Grende (China) Ye Qiuyu	5	6	6
(United States) Usue Maitane Arconada (Hungary) Fanny Stollár	7	3	4
(Czech Republic) Marie Bouzková (Hungary) Dalma Gálfi	6	4	9
2	(Australia) Priscilla Hon (Switzerland) Jil Teichmann	1	6	7

Final
(Indonesia) Tami Grende (China) Ye Qiuyu	6	7^{7}
(Czech Republic) Marie Bouzková (Hungary) Dalma Gálfi	2	6^{5}

=== Top half ===
First round
1	(Ukraine) Anhelina Kalinina (Belarus) Iryna Shymanovich	7^{7}	6
(Turkey) İpek Soylu (China) Xu Shilin	6^{2}	4
(United States) Dasha Ivanova (United States) Katrine Steffensen	6	6
(Australia) Kimberly Birrell (Belgium) Greetje Minnen	3	3
(Romania) Jaqueline Cristian (Romania) Elena-Gabriela Ruse	6	7^{7}
WC	(United Kingdom) Maia Lumsden (United Kingdom) Gabriella Taylor	4	6^{5}
(Indonesia) Tami Grende (China) Ye Qiuyu	5	7	6
6	(Croatia) Jana Fett (Romania) Ioana Loredana Roșca	7	5	4
4	(United Kingdom) Katie Boulter (Serbia) Ivana Jorović	6	6
(Russia) Evgeniya Levashova (Australia) Seone Mendez	3	1
(Ukraine) Helen Ploskina (Bulgaria) Julia Terziyska	3	7^{8}	6
(Brazil) Luisa Stefani (Mexico) Renata Zarazúa	6	6^{6}	3
WC	(United Kingdom) Anna Brogan (United Kingdom) Harriet Dart	6	1	4
(United States) Usue Maitane Arconada (Hungary) Fanny Stollár	4	6	6
(United States) Michaela Gordon (United States) Sofia Kenin	6	2	0
8	(Slovakia) Viktória Kužmová (Slovakia) Kristína Schmiedlová	4	6	6

Second round
1	(Ukraine) A Kalinina (Belarus) I Shymanovich	6	4	6
(United States) D Ivanova (United States) K Steffensen	3	6	1
(Romania) J Cristian (Romania) E-G Ruse	4	6	3
(Indonesia) T Grende (China) Q Ye	6	4	6
4	(United Kingdom) K Boulter (Serbia) I Jorović	6	6
(Ukraine) H Ploskina (Bulgaria) J Terziyska	3	1
(United States) UM Arconada (Hungary) F Stollár	5	6	6
8	(Slovakia) V Kužmová (Slovakia) K Schmiedlová	7	4	3

Quarterfinals
1	(Ukraine) A Kalinina (Belarus) I Shymanovich	6^{3}	5
(Indonesia) T Grende (China) Q Ye	7^{7}	7
4	(United Kingdom) K Boulter (Serbia) I Jorović	6^{5}	7	7
(United States) UM Arconada (Hungary) F Stollár	7^{7}	5	9

Semifinals
(Indonesia) T Grende (China) Q Ye	5	6	6
(United States) UM Arconada (Hungary) F Stollár	7	3	4

=== Bottom half ===
First round
Alt	(United Kingdom) Emily Appleton (United Kingdom) Eden Richardson	3	4
WC	(United Kingdom) Emily Arbuthnott (United Kingdom) Holly Hutchinson	6	6
(France) Lucie Wargnier (France) Margot Yerolymos	3	6^{1}
(Czech Republic) Marie Bouzková (Hungary) Dalma Gálfi	6	7^{7}
(United Kingdom) Freya Christie (United Kingdom) Isabelle Wallace
Alt	(Denmark) Emilie Francati (Italy) Verena Hofer	w/o
(United States) Raveena Kingsley (United States) Kaitlyn McCarthy	1	6	1
3	(Australia) Naiktha Bains (United States) Tornado Alicia Black	6	1	6
5	(Spain) Paula Badosa Gibert (Spain) Aliona Bolsova Zadoinov	5	6	2
(Canada) Katherine Sebov (Brazil) Leticia Garcia Vidal	7	3	6
(Mexico) Regina Clark (Puerto Rico) Yolimar Ogando	4	7^{8}	1
(Lithuania) Justina Mikulskytė (Russia) Natalia Vikhlyantseva	6	6^{6}	6
WC	(United Kingdom) Jodie Anna Burrage (United Kingdom) Anastasia Mikheeva	3	2
(Hungary) Anna Bondár (Latvia) Jeļena Ostapenko	6	6
(Austria) Julia Grabher (Italy) Bianca Turati	3	4
2	(Australia) Priscilla Hon (Switzerland) Jil Teichmann	6	6

Second round
WC	(United Kingdom) E Arbuthnott (United Kingdom) H Hutchinson	3	2
(Czech Republic) M Bouzková (Hungary) D Gálfi	6	6
(United Kingdom) F Christie (United Kingdom) I Wallace	6^{7}	4
3	(Australia) N Bains (United States) TA Black	7^{9}	6
(Canada) K Sebov (Brazil) LG Vidal
(Lithuania) J Mikulskytė (Russia) N Vikhlyantseva	w/o
(Hungary) A Bondár (Latvia) J Ostapenko	5	1
2	(Australia) P Hon (Switzerland) J Teichmann	7	6

Quarterfinals
(Czech Republic) M Bouzková (Hungary) D Gálfi	6	2	6
3	(Australia) N Bains (United States) TA Black	1	6	3
(Canada) K Sebov (Brazil) LG Vidal	3	1
2	(Australia) P Hon (Switzerland) J Teichmann	6	6

Semifinals
(Czech Republic) M Bouzková (Hungary) D Gálfi	6	4	9
2	(Australia) P Hon (Switzerland) J Teichmann	1	6	7
