= 2014 Wimbledon Championships – Ladies' invitation doubles =

Ladies' invitation doubles
- 2014 Wimbledon Championships

Final
- Champions: (Czech Republic) Jana Novotná (Austria) Barbara Schett
- Runners-up: (United States) Martina Navratilova (Tunisia) Selima Sfar
- Score: 6–0, 7–6^{(7–2)}

Events
Singles	men	women		boys	girls
Doubles	men	women	mixed	boys	girls
WC Singles	men	women	quad
WC Doubles	men	women	quad
Legends	men	women	seniors
← 2013 ·	Wimbledon Championships	· 2015 →

Lindsay Davenport and Martina Hingis were the defending champions but Hingis chose to compete in the women's doubles main draw this year. Davenport played alongside Mary Joe Fernández but they were eliminated in the round robin stage.

Jana Novotná and Barbara Schett defeated Martina Navratilova and Selima Sfar in the final, 6–0, 7–6^{(7–2)} to win the ladies' invitation doubles tennis title at the 2014 Wimbledon Championships.

== Draw ==
Key

- Q = Qualifier
- WC = Wild card
- LL = Lucky loser
- Alt = Alternate
- ITF = ITF entry
- PR = Protected ranking
- SR = Special ranking
- SE = Special exempt
- JE = Junior exempt
- JR = Junior Accelerator Programme entrant
- CO = College Accelerator Programme entrant
- NG = Next Gen Accelerator Program entrant
- w/o = Walkover
- r = Retired
- d = Defaulted

=== Final ===
Final
(United States) Martina Navratilova (Tunisia) Selima Sfar	0	6^{2}
(Czech Republic) Jana Novotná (Austria) Barbara Schett	6	7^{7}

=== Group A ===
		(United States) Davenport (United States) Fernández	(United Kingdom) Keothavong (Spain) Martínez	(Croatia) Majoli (Bulgaria) Maleeva	(United States) Navratilova (Tunisia) Sfar	RR; W–L	Set; W–L	Game; W–L	Standings
A1	(United States) Lindsay Davenport (United States) Mary Joe Fernández		6–3, 6–4	4–6, 7–5, [8–10]	w/o	1-2	3–2	23–19	3
A2	(United Kingdom) Anne Keothavong (Spain) Conchita Martínez	3–6, 4–6		w/o	0–6, 1–6	0–3	0–4	8–24	4
A3	(Croatia) Iva Majoli (Bulgaria) Magdalena Maleeva	7–5, 4–6, [10–8]	w/o		3–6, 4–6	2–1	2–3	19–23	2
A4	(United States) Martina Navratilova (Tunisia) Selima Sfar	w/o	6–0, 6–1	6–3, 6–4		3–0	4–0	24–8	1

Standings are determined by: 1. number of wins; 2. number of matches; 3. in two-players-ties, head-to-head records; 4. in three-players-ties, percentage of sets won, or of games won; 5. steering-committee decision.

=== Group B ===
		(United States) Austin (Czech Republic) Suková	(United States) Jaeger (Australia) Stubbs	(Czech Republic) Novotná (Austria) Schett	(France) Tauziat (Hungary) Temesvári	RR; W–L	Set; W–L	Game; W–L	Standings
B1	(United States) Tracy Austin (Czech Republic) Helena Suková		6–4, 6–4	7–6^{(7–5)}, 2–2, ret.	7–5, 6–2	2–1	5–1	34–23	2
B2	(United States) Andrea Jaeger (Australia) Rennae Stubbs	4–6, 4–6		2–6, 4–6	7–5, 6–2	1–2	2–4	27–31	3
B3	(Czech Republic) Jana Novotná (Austria) Barbara Schett	6–7^{(5–7)}, 2–2, ret.	6–2, 6–4		6–4, 6–2	3–0	5–1	32–21	1
B4	(France) Nathalie Tauziat (Hungary) Andrea Temesvári	5–7, 2–6	5–7, 2–6	4–6, 2–6		0–3	0–6	20–38	4

Standings are determined by: 1. number of wins; 2. number of matches; 3. in two-players-ties, head-to-head records; 4. in three-players-ties, percentage of sets won, or of games won; 5. steering-committee decision.
