= 2014 Wimbledon Championships – Gentlemen's invitation doubles =

Gentlemen's invitation doubles
- 2014 Wimbledon Championships

Final
- Champions: (Sweden) Thomas Enqvist (Australia) Mark Philippoussis
- Runners-up: (Netherlands) Jacco Eltingh (Netherlands) Paul Haarhuis
- Score: 3–6, 6–3, [10–3]

Events
| Singles | men | women | | boys | girls |
| Doubles | men | women | mixed | boys | girls |
| WC Singles | men | women | quad |
| WC Doubles | men | women | quad |
| Legends | men | women | seniors |
| ← 2013 · | Wimbledon Championships | · 2015 → |

Thomas Enqvist and Mark Philippoussis successfully defended their title, defeating Jacco Eltingh and Paul Haarhuis in the final, 3–6, 6–3, [10–3] to win the gentlemen's invitation doubles tennis title at the 2014 Wimbledon Championships.

== Draw ==
=== Key ===
- Q = Qualifier
- WC = Wild card
- LL = Lucky loser
- Alt = Alternate
- ITF = ITF entry
- PR = Protected ranking
- SR = Special ranking
- SE = Special exempt
- JE = Junior exempt
- JR = Junior Accelerator Programme entrant
- CO = College Accelerator Programme entrant
- NG = Next Gen Accelerator Program entrant
- w/o = Walkover
- r = Retired
- d = Defaulted

=== Final ===
| Final |
| (Sweden) Thomas Enqvist (Australia) Mark Philippoussis | 3 | 6 | [10] |
| (Netherlands) Jacco Eltingh (Netherlands) Paul Haarhuis | 6 | 3 | [3] |

=== Group A ===
| | | (Sweden) Björkman (Australia) Woodbridge | (Sweden) Enqvist (Australia) Philippoussis | (United States) Gimelstob (United Kingdom) Wilkinson (The Bahamas) Knowles | (Croatia) Ivanišević (Croatia) Ljubičić | RR; W–L | Set; W–L | Game; W–L | Standings |
| A1 | (Sweden) Jonas Björkman (Australia) Todd Woodbridge | | 3–6, 6–7^{(5–7)} | 1–1, ret. (w/ Knowles) | 6–4, 7–6^{(7–4)} | 2–1 | 3–2 | 23–24 | 2 |
| A2 | (Sweden) Thomas Enqvist (Australia) Mark Philippoussis | 6–3, 7–6^{(7–5)} | | 6–4, 3–6, [10–4] (w/ Wilkinson) | 6–4, 6–7^{(6–8)}, [10–5] | 3–0 | 6–2 | 36–30 | 1 |
| A3 | (United States) Justin Gimelstob (United Kingdom) Chris Wilkinson (The Bahamas) Mark Knowles | 1–1, ret. (w/ Knowles) | 4–6, 6–3, [4–10] (w/ Wilkinson) | | 6–3, 1–6, [7–10] (w/ Wilkinson) | 0–2; 0–1 | 2–4; 0–1 | 17–21; 1–1 | 4 X |
| A4 | (Croatia) Goran Ivanišević (Croatia) Ivan Ljubičić | 4–6, 6–7^{(4–7)} | 4–6, 7–6^{(8–6)}, [5–10] | 3–6, 6–1, [10–7] (w/ Wilkinson) | | 1–2 | 3–5 | 32–33 | 3 |

Standings are determined by: 1. number of wins; 2. number of matches; 3. in two-players-ties, head-to-head records; 4. in three-players-ties, percentage of sets won, or of games won; 5. steering-committee decision.

=== Group B ===
| | | (Spain) Costa (Sweden) Johansson | (Netherlands) Eltingh (Netherlands) Haarhuis | (South Africa) Ferreira (United Kingdom) Petchey | (United Kingdom) Rusedski (France) Santoro | RR; W–L | Set; W–L | Game; W–L | Standings |
| B1 | (Spain) Albert Costa (Sweden) Thomas Johansson | | 3–6, 4–6 | 7–5, 5–7, [10–8] | 6–4, 6–7^{(2–7)}, [7–10] | 1–2 | 3–5 | 32–36 | 3 |
| B2 | (Netherlands) Jacco Eltingh (Netherlands) Paul Haarhuis | 6–3, 6–4 | | 7–5, 7–5 | 6–3, 6–4 | 3–0 | 6–0 | 38–24 | 1 |
| B3 | (South Africa) Wayne Ferreira (United Kingdom) Mark Petchey | 5–7, 7–5, [8–10] | 5–7, 5–7 | | 2–6, 5–7 | 0–3 | 1–6 | 29–40 | 4 |
| B4 | (United Kingdom) Greg Rusedski (France) Fabrice Santoro | 4–6, 7–6^{(7–2)}, [10–7] | 3–6, 4–6 | 6–2, 7–5 | | 2–1 | 4–3 | 32–31 | 2 |

Standings are determined by: 1. number of wins; 2. number of matches; 3. in two-players-ties, head-to-head records; 4. in three-players-ties, percentage of sets won, or of games won; 5. steering-committee decision.
