= 2014 Wimbledon Championships – Mixed doubles =

Mixed doubles
- 2014 Wimbledon Championships

Final
- Champions: (Serbia) Nenad Zimonjić (Australia) Samantha Stosur
- Runners-up: (Belarus) Max Mirnyi (Chinese Taipei) Chan Hao-ching
- Score: 6–4, 6–2

Details
- Draw: 48 (4 WC )
- Seeds: 16

Events
Singles	men	women		boys	girls
Doubles	men	women	mixed	boys	girls
WC Singles	men	women	quad
WC Doubles	men	women	quad
Legends	men	women	seniors
← 2013 ·	Wimbledon Championships	· 2015 →

Daniel Nestor and Kristina Mladenovic were the defending champions, but lost in the semifinals to Max Mirnyi and Chan Hao-ching.

Nenad Zimonjić and Samantha Stosur defeated Mirnyi and Chan in the final, 6–4, 6–2 to win the mixed doubles tennis title at the 2014 Wimbledon Championships.

== Seeds ==
All seeds received a bye into the second round.

1. (United States) Mike Bryan / (Slovenia) Katarina Srebotnik (second round)
2. (United States) Bob Bryan / (Czech Republic) Květa Peschke (third round)
3. (Austria) Alexander Peya / (United States) Abigail Spears (second round)
4. (India) Leander Paes / (Zimbabwe) Cara Black (second round)
5. (Canada) Daniel Nestor / (France) Kristina Mladenovic (semifinals)
6. (Romania) Horia Tecău / (India) Sania Mirza (third round)
7. (India) Rohan Bopanna / (Czech Republic) Andrea Hlaváčková (third round)
8. (Netherlands) Jean-Julien Rojer / (Germany) Anna-Lena Grönefeld (withdrew)
9. (Spain) David Marrero / (Spain) Arantxa Parra Santonja (second round)
10. (United Kingdom) Jamie Murray / (Australia) Casey Dellacqua (quarterfinals)
11. (Colombia) Juan Sebastián Cabal / (United States) Raquel Kops-Jones (second round)
12. (Australia) John Peers / (Australia) Ashleigh Barty (third round)
13. (Brazil) Bruno Soares / (Switzerland) Martina Hingis (quarterfinals)
14. (Belarus) Max Mirnyi / (Chinese Taipei) Chan Hao-ching (final)
15. (Serbia) Nenad Zimonjić / (Australia) Samantha Stosur (champions)
16. (Pakistan) Aisam-ul-Haq Qureshi / (Russia) Vera Dushevina (semifinals)

Click on the seed number of a player to go to their draw section.

== Draw ==
=== Key ===
- Q = Qualifier
- WC = Wild card
- LL = Lucky loser
- Alt = Alternate
- ITF = ITF entry
- PR = Protected ranking
- SR = Special ranking
- SE = Special exempt
- JE = Junior exempt
- JR = Junior Accelerator Programme entrant
- CO = College Accelerator Programme entrant
- NG = Next Gen Accelerator Program entrant
- w/o = Walkover
- r = Retired
- d = Defaulted

=== Finals ===
Quarterfinals
14	(Belarus) Max Mirnyi (Chinese Taipei) Chan Hao-ching	6	3	6
10	(United Kingdom) Jamie Murray (Australia) Casey Dellacqua	2	6	3
13	(Brazil) Bruno Soares (Switzerland) Martina Hingis	4	6^{3}
5	(Canada) Daniel Nestor (France) Kristina Mladenovic	6	7^{7}
(Russia) Mikhail Elgin (Australia) Anastasia Rodionova	3	1
15	(Serbia) Nenad Zimonjić (Australia) Samantha Stosur	6	6
WC	(United Kingdom) Neal Skupski (United Kingdom) Naomi Broady	4	3
16	(Pakistan) Aisam-ul-Haq Qureshi (Russia) Vera Dushevina	6	6

Semifinals
14	(Belarus) Max Mirnyi (Chinese Taipei) Chan Hao-ching	7^{7}	7
5	(Canada) Daniel Nestor (France) Kristina Mladenovic	6^{4}	5
15	(Serbia) Nenad Zimonjić (Australia) Samantha Stosur	7	6
16	(Pakistan) Aisam-ul-Haq Qureshi (Russia) Vera Dushevina	5	2

Final
14	(Belarus) Max Mirnyi (Chinese Taipei) Chan Hao-ching	4	2
15	(Serbia) Nenad Zimonjić (Australia) Samantha Stosur	6	6

=== Top half ===
==== Section 1 ====
First round
(Finland) H Kontinen (Russia) A Kudryavtseva	3	4
(Australia) C Guccione (Georgia (country)) O Kalashnikova	6	6
(Poland) T Bednarek (United States) V King	6	6
(India) D Sharan (Japan) S Aoyama	4	4
Alt	(Netherlands) J Huta Galung (Slovenia) A Klepač	6	3	6
(Italy) D Bracciali (Italy) K Knapp	3	6	1
(Croatia) M Pavić (Serbia) B Jovanovski	7^{8}	7^{7}
(Austria) J Melzer (Spain) A Medina Garrigues	6^{6}	6^{4}

Second round
1	(United States) M Bryan (Slovenia) K Srebotnik	6	4	3
(Australia) C Guccione (Georgia (country)) O Kalashnikova	2	6	6
(Poland) T Bednarek (United States) V King	6^{5}	4
14	(Belarus) M Mirnyi (Chinese Taipei) H-c Chan	7^{7}	6
10	(United Kingdom) J Murray (Australia) C Dellacqua	7^{10}	6^{5}	6
Alt	(Netherlands) J Huta Galung (Slovenia) A Klepač	6^{8}	7^{7}	4
(Croatia) M Pavić (Serbia) B Jovanovski	3	3
6	(Romania) H Tecău (India) S Mirza	6	6

Third round
(Australia) C Guccione (Georgia (country)) O Kalashnikova	2	6^{4}
14	(Belarus) M Mirnyi (Chinese Taipei) H-c Chan	6	7^{7}
10	(United Kingdom) J Murray (Australia) C Dellacqua	7	6
6	(Romania) H Tecău (India) S Mirza	5	3

Quarterfinals
14	(Belarus) M Mirnyi (Chinese Taipei) H-c Chan	6	3	6
10	(United Kingdom) J Murray (Australia) C Dellacqua	2	6	3

==== Section 2 ====
First round
(Czech Republic) L Rosol (Czech Republic) K Koukalová	4	0
(Slovakia) M Kližan (Switzerland) B Bencic	6	6
WC	(United Kingdom) J Ward (United Kingdom) A Smith	2	5
(United States) N Monroe (China) S Zhang	6	7
(Czech Republic) J Levinský (Slovakia) J Husárová	6	6
(Russia) D Tursunov (United States) M Moulton-Levy	4	4
Alt	(New Zealand) M Venus (Poland) A Rosolska	3	4
(Czech Republic) L Dlouhý (United States) L Huber	6	6

Second round
3	(Austria) A Peya (United States) A Spears	4	2
(Slovakia) M Kližan (Switzerland) B Bencic	6	6
(United States) N Monroe (China) S Zhang	1	1
13	(Brazil) B Soares (Switzerland) M Hingis	6	6
12	(Australia) J Peers (Australia) A Barty	w/o
(Czech Republic) J Levinský (Slovakia) J Husárová
(Czech Republic) L Dlouhý (United States) L Huber	5	2
5	(Canada) D Nestor (France) K Mladenovic	7	6

Third round
(Slovakia) M Kližan (Switzerland) B Bencic	3	7	7
13	(Brazil) B Soares (Switzerland) M Hingis	6	5	9
12	(Australia) J Peers (Australia) A Barty	6^{4}	3
5	(Canada) D Nestor (France) K Mladenovic	7^{7}	6

Quarterfinals
13	(Brazil) B Soares (Switzerland) M Hingis	4	6^{3}
5	(Canada) D Nestor (France) K Mladenovic	6	7^{7}

=== Bottom half ===
==== Section 3 ====
First round
(United States) S Lipsky (China) J Zheng	2	0
WC	(United Kingdom) C Fleming (United Kingdom) J Rae	6	6
WC	(United Kingdom) R Hutchins (United Kingdom) H Watson	1	6	7
(Russia) M Elgin (Australia) A Rodionova	6	1	9
(Germany) M Emmrich (Netherlands) M Krajicek	6	3	6
(Mexico) S González (Chinese Taipei) Y-j Chan	2	6	2
(United States) E Butorac (Hungary) T Babos	6	4	6
(Austria) P Oswald (Austria) Y Meusburger	0	6	3

Second round
7	(India) R Bopanna (Czech Republic) A Hlaváčková	6	7
WC	(United Kingdom) C Fleming (United Kingdom) J Rae	4	5
(Russia) M Elgin (Australia) A Rodionova	6	7
11	(Colombia) JS Cabal (United States) R Kops-Jones	2	5
15	(Serbia) N Zimonjić (Australia) S Stosur	6	6
(Germany) M Emmrich (Netherlands) M Krajicek	1	2
(United States) E Butorac (Hungary) T Babos	1	6	6
4	(India) L Paes (Zimbabwe) C Black	6	2	3

Third round
7	(India) R Bopanna (Czech Republic) A Hlaváčková	6	5	3
(Russia) M Elgin (Australia) A Rodionova	3	7	6
15	(Serbia) N Zimonjić (Australia) S Stosur	2	6	8
(United States) E Butorac (Hungary) T Babos	6	2	6

Quarterfinals
(Russia) M Elgin (Australia) A Rodionova	3	1
15	(Serbia) N Zimonjić (Australia) S Stosur	6	6

==== Section 4 ====
First round
(Germany) A Begemann (Ukraine) O Savchuk	4	6	1
(Romania) F Mergea (Ukraine) E Svitolina	6	3	6
WC	(United Kingdom) N Skupski (United Kingdom) N Broady	7	7^{7}
(Colombia) R Farah (Croatia) D Jurak	5	6^{5}
(Czech Republic) F Čermák (Czech Republic) L Hradecká	1	2
(Austria) O Marach (Czech Republic) Ka Plíšková	6	6
(United Kingdom) D Inglot (United Kingdom) J Konta	7^{7}	6
(South Africa) R Klaasen (New Zealand) M Erakovic	6^{5}	4

Second round
Alt	(Brazil) A Sá (Czech Republic) R Voráčová	4	4
(Romania) F Mergea (Ukraine) E Svitolina	6	6
WC	(United Kingdom) N Skupski (United Kingdom) N Broady	2	6	6
9	(Spain) D Marrero (Spain) A Parra Santonja	6	3	4
16	(Pakistan) A-u-H Qureshi (Russia) V Dushevina	3	7^{7}	6
(Austria) O Marach (Czech Republic) Ka Plíšková	6	6^{1}	3
(United Kingdom) D Inglot (United Kingdom) J Konta	6^{6}	3
2	(United States) B Bryan (Czech Republic) K Peschke	7^{8}	6

Third round
(Romania) F Mergea (Ukraine) E Svitolina	6	3	4
WC	(United Kingdom) N Skupski (United Kingdom) N Broady	4	6	6
16	(Pakistan) A-u-H Qureshi (Russia) V Dushevina	7	6
2	(United States) B Bryan (Czech Republic) K Peschke	5	4

Quarterfinals
WC	(United Kingdom) N Skupski (United Kingdom) N Broady	4	3
16	(Pakistan) A-u-H Qureshi (Russia) V Dushevina	6	6
