= 2014 Wimbledon Championships – Senior gentlemen's invitation doubles =

Senior gentlemen's invitation doubles
- 2014 Wimbledon Championships

Final
- Champions: (France) Guy Forget (France) Cédric Pioline
- Runners-up: (United States) Rick Leach (Australia) Mark Woodforde
- Score: 6–4, 6–3

Events
Singles	men	women		boys	girls
Doubles	men	women	mixed	boys	girls
WC Singles	men	women	quad
WC Doubles	men	women	quad
Legends	men	women	seniors
← 2013 ·	Wimbledon Championships	· 2015 →

Pat Cash and Mark Woodforde were the defending champions, but Cash chose not to compete this year.

Guy Forget and Cédric Pioline defeated Woodforde and Rick Leach in the final, 6–4, 6–3 to win the senior gentlemen's invitation doubles tennis title at the 2014 Wimbledon Championships.

== Draw ==
=== Key ===
- Q = Qualifier
- WC = Wild card
- LL = Lucky loser
- Alt = Alternate
- ITF = ITF entry
- PR = Protected ranking
- SR = Special ranking
- SE = Special exempt
- JE = Junior exempt
- JR = Junior Accelerator Programme entrant
- CO = College Accelerator Programme entrant
- NG = Next Gen Accelerator Program entrant
- w/o = Walkover
- r = Retired
- d = Defaulted

=== Final ===
Final
(United States) Rick Leach (Australia) Mark Woodforde	4	3
(France) Guy Forget (France) Cédric Pioline	6	6

=== Group A ===
		(Iran) Bahrami (France) Leconte	(United States) Fleming (United States) McEnroe	(United States) Leach (Australia) Woodforde	(Australia) McNamara (Australia) McNamee	RR; W–L	Set; W–L	Game; W–L	Standings
A1	(Iran) Mansour Bahrami (France) Henri Leconte		7–6^{(7–4)}, 6–3	3–6, 6–7^{(7–9)}	7–5, 6–4	2–1	4–2	35–31	2
A2	(United States) Peter Fleming (United States) Patrick McEnroe	6–7^{(4–7)}, 3–6		2–6, 4–6	6–1, 6–4	1–2	2–4	27–30	3
A3	(United States) Rick Leach (Australia) Mark Woodforde	6–3, 7–6^{(9–7)}	6–2, 6–4		6–2, 7–5	3–0	6–0	38–22	1
A4	(Australia) Peter McNamara (Australia) Paul McNamee	5–7, 4–6	1–6, 4–6	2–6, 5–7		0–3	0–6	21–38	4

Standings are determined by: 1. number of wins; 2. number of matches; 3. in two-players-ties, head-to-head records; 4. in three-players-ties, percentage of sets won, or of games won; 5. steering-committee decision.

=== Group B ===
		(United Kingdom) Bates (Sweden) Järryd	(Spain) Casal (Sweden) Nyström	(United Kingdom) Castle (Sweden) Pernfors	(France) Forget (France) Pioline	RR; W–L	Set; W–L	Game; W–L	Standings
B1	(United Kingdom) Jeremy Bates (Sweden) Anders Järryd		6–2, 6–4	3–6, 4–6	1–6, 7–6^{(7–1)}, [6–10]	1–2	3–4	27–31	3
B2	(Spain) Sergio Casal (Sweden) Joakim Nyström	2–6, 4–6		2–5, ret.	3–6, 2–6	0–3	0–5	13–29	4
B3	(United Kingdom) Andrew Castle (Sweden) Mikael Pernfors	6–3, 6–4	5–2, ret.		3–6, 4–6	2–1	3–2	24–21	2
B4	(France) Guy Forget (France) Cédric Pioline	6–1, 6–7^{(1–7)}, [10–6]	6–3, 6–2	6–3, 6–4		3–0	6–1	37–20	1

Standings are determined by: 1. number of wins; 2. number of matches; 3. in two-players-ties, head-to-head records; 4. in three-players-ties, percentage of sets won, or of games won; 5. steering-committee decision.
