= 2014 Wimbledon Championships – Boys' singles =

Boys' singles
- 2014 Wimbledon Championships

Final
- Champion: (United States) Noah Rubin
- Runner-up: (United States) Stefan Kozlov
- Score: 6–4, 4–6, 6–3

Details
- Draw: 64 (8Q / 8WC)
- Seeds: 16

Events
Singles	men	women		boys	girls
Doubles	men	women	mixed	boys	girls
WC Singles	men	women	quad
WC Doubles	men	women	quad
Legends	men	women	seniors
- Wimbledon Championships

Noah Rubin defeated Stefan Kozlov in the final, 6–4, 4–6, 6–3 to win the boys' singles tennis title at the 2014 Wimbledon Championships.

Gianluigi Quinzi was the defending champion, but chose not to compete this year.

== Seeds ==
1. (Russia) Andrey Rublev (third round)
2. (South Korea) Chung Hyeon (quarterfinals)
3. (Brazil) Orlando Luz (first round)
4. (Spain) Jaume Munar (second round)
5. (France) Quentin Halys (first round)
6. (United States) Stefan Kozlov (final)
7. (United States) Frances Tiafoe (third round)
8. (France) Johan Tatlot (semifinals)
9. (Japan) Naoki Nakagawa (third round)
10. (South Korea) Lee Duck-hee (first round)
11. (United States) Michael Mmoh (third round)
12. (Poland) Kamil Majchrzak (second round)
13. (Argentina) Matías Zukas (second round)
14. (Brazil) Marcelo Zormann (second round)
15. (Japan) Jumpei Yamasaki (first round)
16. (Russia) Daniil Medvedev (first round)

Click on the seed number of a player to go to their draw section.

== Draw ==
Key

- Q = Qualifier
- WC = Wild card
- LL = Lucky loser
- Alt = Alternate
- ITF = ITF entry
- PR = Protected ranking
- SR = Special ranking
- SE = Special exempt
- JE = Junior exempt
- JR = Junior Accelerator Programme entrant
- CO = College Accelerator Programme entrant
- NG = Next Gen Accelerator Program entrant
- w/o = Walkover
- r = Retired
- d = Defaulted

=== Finals ===
Quarterfinals
(Netherlands) Tim van Rijthoven	6^{6}	6^{5}
Q	(United States) Noah Rubin	7^{8}	7^{7}
(United States) Taylor Fritz	7	6^{5}	7
(Italy) Filippo Baldi	5	7^{7}	5
8	(France) Johan Tatlot	7^{7}	6
WC	(United Kingdom) Joshua Sapwell	6^{5}	1
6	(United States) Stefan Kozlov	6	7^{8}
2	(South Korea) Chung Hyeon	4	6^{6}

Semifinals
Q	(United States) Noah Rubin	6	6
(United States) Taylor Fritz	4	2
8	(France) Johan Tatlot	3	6^{7}
6	(United States) Stefan Kozlov	6	7^{9}

Final
Q	(United States) Noah Rubin	6	4	6
6	(United States) Stefan Kozlov	4	6	3

=== Top half ===
==== Section 1 ====
First round
1	(Russia) Andrey Rublev	6	4	6
(United States) Henrik Wiersholm	1	6	4
Q	(Italy) Matteo Berrettini	6	6
Q	(Australia) Akira Santillan	4	3
(Peru) Juan José Rosas	2	6^{3}
(Australia) Harry Bourchier	6	7^{7}
(Netherlands) Tim van Rijthoven	6	6
15	(Japan) Jumpei Yamasaki	1	2
12	(Poland) Kamil Majchrzak	6	6
(Brazil) João Menezes	3	4
WC	(United Kingdom) Jamie Malik	2	4
Q	(United States) Noah Rubin	6	6
(Romania) Bogdan Ionuț Apostol	6	6^{6}	4
(South Korea) Chung Yun-seong	2	7^{8}	6
(Slovakia) Martin Blaško	4	6	3
7	(United States) Frances Tiafoe	6	3	6

Second round
1	(Russia) A Rublev	4	6	14
Q	(Italy) M Berrettini	6	3	12
(Australia) H Bourchier	4	6^{7}
(Netherlands) T van Rijthoven	6	7^{9}
12	(Poland) K Majchrzak	3	5
Q	(United States) N Rubin	6	7
(South Korea) Y-s Chung	6^{4}	3
7	(United States) F Tiafoe	7^{7}	6

Third round
1	(Russia) A Rublev	6^{6}	6	5
(Netherlands) T van Rijthoven	7^{8}	4	7
Q	(United States) N Rubin	7^{7}	4	6
7	(United States) F Tiafoe	6^{4}	6	3

Quarterfinals
(Netherlands) T van Rijthoven	6^{6}	6^{5}
Q	(United States) N Rubin	7^{8}	7^{7}

==== Section 2 ====
First round
4	(Spain) Jaume Munar	2	6	7
(South Korea) Kang Ku-keon	6	2	5
(Argentina) Francisco Bahamonde	6	6
(Russia) Bogdan Bobrov	4	1
WC	(United Kingdom) Julian Cash	4	2
(United States) Taylor Fritz	6	6
(Croatia) Nino Serdarušić	7^{11}	1	7
14	(Brazil) Marcelo Zormann	6^{9}	6	9
10/WC	(South Korea) Lee Duck-hee	3	4
(Italy) Filippo Baldi	6	6
Q	(Argentina) Jordi Arconada	6	7
(Czech Republic) David Poljak	4	5
WC	(United Kingdom) Rhett Purcell	6^{5}	6	7
(United States) Alex Rybakov	7^{7}	3	9
(Cyprus) Petros Chrysochos	4	6	6
5	(France) Quentin Halys	6	4	2

Second round
4	(Spain) J Munar	5	6	4
(Argentina) F Bahamonde	7	4	6
(United States) T Fritz	6	7^{7}
14	(Brazil) M Zormann	4	6^{3}
(Italy) F Baldi	6	6
Q	(Argentina) J Arconada	3	4
(United States) A Rybakov	6	6
(Cyprus) P Chrysochos	4	3

Third round
(Argentina) F Bahamonde	7^{7}	3	3
(United States) T Fritz	6^{3}	6	6
(Italy) F Baldi	4	6	6
(United States) A Rybakov	6	3	1

Quarterfinals
(United States) T Fritz	7	6^{5}	7
(Italy) F Baldi	5	7^{7}	5

=== Bottom half ===
==== Section 3 ====
First round
8	(France) Johan Tatlot	7	4	12
(Australia) Omar Jasika	5	6	10
(Peru) Nicolás Álvarez	6^{7}	3
(Slovakia) Alex Molčan	7^{9}	6
WC	(United Kingdom) Harry Garnett	5	4
(Poland) Jan Zieliński	7	6
(Germany) Jan Choinski	7^{7}	3	1
11	(United States) Michael Mmoh	6^{2}	6	6
13	(Argentina) Matías Zukas	6	3	6
(South Korea) Oh Chan-yeong	4	6	1
LL	(Peru) Pedro Iamachkine	7^{7}	6
(United States) Dennis Uspensky	6^{4}	3
(Japan) Ryotaro Matsumura	6	6^{4}	11
(Romania) Nicolae Frunză	2	7^{7}	13
WC	(United Kingdom) Joshua Sapwell	4	6	6
3	(Brazil) Orlando Luz	6	3	0

Second round
8	(France) J Tatlot	6	6
(Slovakia) A Molčan	4	2
(Poland) J Zieliński	3	2
11	(United States) M Mmoh	6	6
13	(Argentina) M Zukas	6	5	2
LL	(Peru) P Iamachkine	2	7	6
(Romania) N Frunză	4	3
WC	(United Kingdom) J Sapwell	6	6

Third round
8	(France) J Tatlot	7	6
11	(United States) M Mmoh	5	3
LL	(Peru) P Iamachkine	1	3
WC	(United Kingdom) J Sapwell	6	6

Quarterfinals
8	(France) J Tatlot	7^{7}	6
WC	(United Kingdom) J Sapwell	6^{5}	1

==== Section 4 ====
First round
6	(United States) Stefan Kozlov	6	6
Q	(Brazil) Rafael Matos	4	1
(Spain) Pedro Martínez	6	6
Q	(South Korea) Hong Seong-chan	4	2
(Poland) Hubert Hurkacz	1	2
(Austria) Lucas Miedler	6	6
(Sweden) Daniel Appelgren	5	2
9	(Japan) Naoki Nakagawa	7	6
16	(Russia) Daniil Medvedev	6	6^{5}	1^{r}
(Serbia) Petar Čonkić	3	7^{7}	2
(Australia) Marc Polmans	5	2
(United States) Logan Smith	7	6
WC	(United Kingdom) Alexander Sendegeya	3	0
Q	(Denmark) Simon Friis Søndergaard	6	6
Q	(Italy) Andrea Pellegrino	1	2
2/WC	(South Korea) Chung Hyeon	6	6

Second round
6	(United States) S Kozlov	6	6
(Spain) P Martínez	0	2
(Austria) L Miedler	2	5
9	(Japan) N Nakagawa	6	7
(Serbia) P Čonkić	6^{0}	3
(United States) L Smith	7^{7}	6
Q	(Denmark) SF Søndergaard	1	1
2/WC	(South Korea) H Chung	6	6

Third round
6	(United States) S Kozlov	6	7^{7}
9	(Japan) N Nakagawa	3	6^{2}
(United States) L Smith	2	3
2	(South Korea) H Chung	6	6

Quarterfinals
6	(United States) S Kozlov	6	7^{8}
2	(South Korea) H Chung	4	6^{6}
