= 2014 Wimbledon Championships – Girls' singles =

Girls' singles
- 2014 Wimbledon Championships

Final
- Champion: (Latvia) Jeļena Ostapenko
- Runner-up: (Slovakia) Kristína Schmiedlová
- Score: 2–6, 6–3, 6–0

Details
- Draw: 64 (8 Q / 8 WC )
- Seeds: 16

Events
| Singles | men | women | | boys | girls |
| Doubles | men | women | mixed | boys | girls |
| WC Singles | men | women | quad |
| WC Doubles | men | women | quad |
| Legends | men | women | seniors |
| ← 2013 · | Wimbledon Championships | · 2015 → |

Jeļena Ostapenko defeated Kristína Schmiedlová in the final, 2–6, 6–3, 6–0 to win the girls' singles title at the 2014 Wimbledon Championships.

Belinda Bencic was the defending champion, but chose to compete in the women's singles event where she lost to Simona Halep in the third round.

== Seeds ==
1. (Serbia) Ivana Jorović (second round)
2. (United States) CiCi Bellis (first round)
3. (United States) Tornado Alicia Black (quarterfinals)
4. (Spain) Aliona Bolsova Zadoinov (first round)
5. (Switzerland) Jil Teichmann (third round)
6. (Belarus) Iryna Shymanovich (first round)
7. (Canada) Françoise Abanda (third round)
8. (Slovakia) Kristína Schmiedlová (final)
9. (Ukraine) Anhelina Kalinina (third round)
10. (China) Xu Shilin (quarterfinals)
11. (Romania) Ioana Loredana Roșca (third round)
12. (Czech Republic) Markéta Vondroušová (semifinals)
13. (Australia) Priscilla Hon (first round)
14. (Egypt) Sandra Samir (first round)
15. (Hungary) Anna Bondár (first round)
16. (Australia) Naiktha Bains (first round)

Click on the seed number of a player to go to their draw section.

== Draw ==
=== Key ===
- Q = Qualifier
- WC = Wild card
- LL = Lucky loser
- Alt = Alternate
- SE = Special exempt
- PR = Protected ranking
- ITF = ITF entry
- JE = Junior exempt
- w/o = Walkover
- r = Retired
- d = Defaulted
- SR = Special ranking

=== Finals ===
Quarterfinals
(Spain) Paula Badosa Gibert | 3 | 2
12 | (Czech Republic) Markéta Vondroušová | 6 | 6
3 | (United States) Tornado Alicia Black | 3 | 1
(Latvia) Jeļena Ostapenko | 6 | 6
10 | (China) Xu Shilin | 4 | 3
(Romania) Elena-Gabriela Ruse | 6 | 6
8 | (Slovakia) Kristína Schmiedlová | 6 | 6
Q | (United States) Michaela Gordon | 3 | 3

Semifinals
12 | (Czech Republic) Markéta Vondroušová | 1 | 2
(Latvia) Jeļena Ostapenko | 6 | 6
(Romania) Elena-Gabriela Ruse | 6 | 3 | 4
8 | (Slovakia) Kristína Schmiedlová | 4 | 6 | 6

Final
(Latvia) Jeļena Ostapenko | 2 | 6 | 6
8 | (Slovakia) Kristína Schmiedlová | 6 | 3 | 0

=== Top half ===
==== Section 1 ====
First round
1 | (Serbia) Ivana Jorović | 6 | 4 | 6
(United States) Kaitlyn McCarthy | 1 | 6 | 3
(Spain) Paula Badosa Gibert | 6 | 6
(Brazil) Luisa Stefani | 3 | 0
WC | (United Kingdom) Gabriella Taylor | 7 | 6
Q | (Canada) Katherine Sebov | 5 | 1
(Indonesia) Tami Grende | 6 | 6
15 | (Hungary) Anna Bondár | 1 | 4
12 | (Czech Republic) Markéta Vondroušová | 7^{7} | 6
WC | (United Kingdom) Freya Christie | 6^{5} | 2
(United States) Katrine Steffensen | 4 | 4
(Slovakia) Viktória Kužmová | 6 | 6
(Australia) Seone Mendez | 6 | 2 | 8
Q | (United Kingdom) Holly Hutchinson | 3 | 6 | 6
(Romania) Jaqueline Cristian | 3 | 2
7 | (Canada) Françoise Abanda | 6 | 6

Second round
1 | (Serbia) I Jorović | 2 | 5
(Spain) P Badosa Gibert | 6 | 7
WC | (United Kingdom) G Taylor | 6 | 6
(Indonesia) T Grende | 4 | 4
12 | (Czech Republic) M Vondroušová | 6 | 6
(Slovakia) V Kužmová | 3 | 2
(Australia) S Mendez | 0 | 4
7 | (Canada) F Abanda | 6 | 6

Third round
(Spain) P Badosa Gibert | 7^{7} | 6
WC | (United Kingdom) G Taylor | 6^{5} | 4
12 | (Czech Republic) M Vondroušová | 7^{8} | 6^{5} | 6
7 | (Canada) F Abanda | 6^{6} | 7^{7} | 2

Quarterfinals
(Spain) P Badosa Gibert | 3 | 2
12 | (Czech Republic) M Vondroušová | 6 | 6

==== Section 2 ====
First round
3 | (United States) Tornado Alicia Black | 6 | 6
Q | (United Kingdom) Anna Brogan | 3 | 4
(Czech Republic) Marie Bouzková | 3 | 3
WC | (Slovakia) Rebecca Šramková | 6 | 6
(France) Margot Yerolymos | 6 | 7^{7}
Q | (Puerto Rico) Yolimar Ogando | 1 | 6^{1}
(United Kingdom) Katie Boulter | 6 | 6
13 | (Australia) Priscilla Hon | 3 | 3
9 | (Ukraine) Anhelina Kalinina | 2 | 7^{7} | 6
WC | (United Kingdom) Harriet Dart | 6 | 6^{2} | 3
(United States) Dasha Ivanova | 7^{7} | 4 | 6
(China) Ye Qiuyu | 6^{4} | 6 | 2
WC | (United Kingdom) Anastasia Mikheeva | 4 | 3
(Latvia) Jeļena Ostapenko | 6 | 6
(Russia) Natalia Vikhlyantseva | 6 | 6
6 | (Belarus) Iryna Shymanovich | 1 | 3

Second round
3 | (United States) TA Black | 6 | 6
WC | (Slovakia) R Šramková | 2 | 4
(France) M Yerolymos | 3 | 3
(United Kingdom) K Boulter | 6 | 6
9 | (Ukraine) A Kalinina | 6 | 6
(United States) D Ivanova | 1 | 2
(Latvia) J Ostapenko | 7^{9} | 4 | 6
(Russia) N Vikhlyantseva | 6^{7} | 6 | 2

Third round
3 | (United States) TA Black | 6 | 6
(United Kingdom) K Boulter | 1 | 2
9 | (Ukraine) A Kalinina | 2 | 2
(Latvia) J Ostapenko | 6 | 6

Quarterfinals
3 | (United States) TA Black | 3 | 1
(Latvia) J Ostapenko | 6 | 6

=== Bottom half ===
==== Section 3 ====
First round
5 | (Switzerland) Jil Teichmann | 6 | 7
(Hungary) Fanny Stollár | 2 | 5
(Russia) Evgeniya Levashova | 6 | 0 | 6
(Italy) Bianca Turati | 3 | 6 | 3
(United States) Raveena Kingsley | 6^{1} | 4
(Czech Republic) Simona Heinová | 7^{7} | 6
WC | (United Kingdom) Emily Arbuthnott | 3 | 2
10 | (China) Xu Shilin | 6 | 6
16 | (Australia) Naiktha Bains | 3 | 4
(Belgium) Greetje Minnen | 6 | 6
(United States) Sofia Kenin | 6 | 6
(Brazil) Leticia Garcia Vidal | 4 | 2
WC | (United Kingdom) Jodie Anna Burrage | 4 | 3
Q | (Turkey) İpek Soylu | 6 | 6
(Romania) Elena-Gabriela Ruse | 6 | 6
4 | (Spain) Aliona Bolsova Zadoinov | 4 | 1

Second round
5 | (Switzerland) J Teichmann | 7 | 4 | 6
(Russia) E Levashova | 5 | 6 | 4
(Czech Republic) S Heinová | 0^{r}
10 | (China) S Xu | 5
(Belgium) G Minnen | 3 | 6 | 6
(United States) S Kenin | 6 | 2 | 4
Q | (Turkey) İ Soylu | 6 | 1 | 4
(Romania) E-G Ruse | 2 | 6 | 6

Third round
5 | (Switzerland) J Teichmann | 7^{7} | 3 | 1
10 | (China) S Xu | 6^{3} | 6 | 6
(Belgium) G Minnen | 4 | 2
(Romania) E-G Ruse | 6 | 6

Quarterfinals
10 | (China) S Xu | 4 | 3
(Romania) E-G Ruse | 6 | 6

==== Section 4 ====
First round
8 | (Slovakia) Kristína Schmiedlová | 6 | 6
(United States) Usue Maitane Arconada | 1 | 2
(Ukraine) Helen Ploskina | 6 | 5 | 3
(Australia) Kimberly Birrell | 2 | 7 | 6
(Mexico) Renata Zarazúa | 6 | 2 | 7
Q | (Lithuania) Justina Mikulskytė | 2 | 6 | 9
(United Kingdom) Katie Swan | 4 | 4
11 | (Romania) Ioana Loredana Roșca | 6 | 6
14 | (Egypt) Sandra Samir | 1 | 6 | 0
Q | (United States) Michaela Gordon | 6 | 3 | 6
(United Kingdom) Isabelle Wallace | 6 | 6
(Austria) Julia Grabher | 1 | 2
Q | (Hungary) Dalma Gálfi | 7 | 6
(Croatia) Jana Fett | 5 | 3
WC | (United Kingdom) Maia Lumsden | 6^{4} | 6 | 6
2 | (United States) CiCi Bellis | 7^{7} | 3 | 4

Second round
8 | (Slovakia) K Schmiedlová | 6 | 7
(Australia) K Birrell | 1 | 5
Q | (Lithuania) J Mikulskytė | 6^{5} | 6 | 5
11 | (Romania) IL Roșca | 7^{7} | 1 | 7
Q | (United States) M Gordon | 6 | 5 | 8
(United Kingdom) I Wallace | 2 | 7 | 6
Q | (Hungary) D Gálfi | 5 | 3
WC | (United Kingdom) M Lumsden | 7 | 6

Third round
8 | (Slovakia) K Schmiedlová | 6 | 6
11 | (Romania) IL Roșca | 2 | 4
Q | (United States) M Gordon | 6 | 6
WC | (United Kingdom) M Lumsden | 2 | 1

Quarterfinals
8 | (Slovakia) K Schmiedlová | 6 | 6
Q | (United States) M Gordon | 3 | 3
