= 2018 Wimbledon Championships – Women's doubles qualifying =

Women's doubles qualifying
- 2018 Wimbledon Championships

Events
Singles	men	women		boys	girls
Doubles	men	women	mixed	boys	girls
WC Singles	men	women	quad
WC Doubles	men	women	quad
Legends	men	women	seniors

Qualification
Singles	men	women
Doubles	men	women
- Wimbledon Championships

Players and pairs who neither have high enough rankings nor receive wild cards may participate in a qualifying tournament held one week before the annual Wimbledon Tennis Championships.

== Seeds ==
1. (Germany) Nicola Geuer / (Switzerland) Viktorija Golubic (qualifying competition, lucky losers)
2. (United States) Desirae Krawczyk / (Australia) Ellen Perez (first round)
3. (Sweden) Cornelia Lister / (United States) Sabrina Santamaria (first round)
4. (Spain) Georgina García Pérez / (Hungary) Fanny Stollár (qualifying competition, lucky losers)
5. (Belgium) Ysaline Bonaventure / (Netherlands) Bibiane Schoofs (qualified)
6. (Australia) Priscilla Hon / (Netherlands) Arantxa Rus (first round)
7. (Australia) Arina Rodionova / (Belgium) Maryna Zanevska (qualified)
8. (Russia) Valeria Savinykh / (Russia) Yana Sizikova (first round)

== Qualifiers ==
1. (Belgium) Ysaline Bonaventure / (Netherlands) Bibiane Schoofs
2. (Chile) Alexa Guarachi / (New Zealand) Erin Routliffe
3. (China) Han Xinyun / (Thailand) Luksika Kumkhum
4. (Australia) Arina Rodionova / (Belgium) Maryna Zanevska

== Lucky losers ==
1. (Germany) Nicola Geuer / (Switzerland) Viktorija Golubic
2. (Spain) Georgina García Pérez / (Hungary) Fanny Stollár
3. (Russia) Anna Blinkova / (Czech Republic) Markéta Vondroušová

== Qualifying draw ==
=== First qualifier ===
First round
1	(Germany) Nicola Geuer (Switzerland) Viktorija Golubic	6	4	12
PR	(Russia) Natela Dzalamidze (Kazakhstan) Galina Voskoboeva	3	6	10
WC	(Canada) Eugenie Bouchard (United States) Caroline Dolehide	5	2
5	(Belgium) Ysaline Bonaventure (Netherlands) Bibiane Schoofs	7	6

Qualifying competition
1	(Germany) Nicola Geuer (Switzerland) Viktorija Golubic	4	0
5	(Belgium) Ysaline Bonaventure (Netherlands) Bibiane Schoofs	6	6

=== Second qualifier ===
First round
2	(United States) Desirae Krawczyk (Australia) Ellen Perez	6	6^{5}	6
(Russia) Anna Kalinskaya (Slovakia) Viktória Kužmová	4	7^{7}	8
(Chile) Alexa Guarachi (New Zealand) Erin Routliffe	6	7
6	(Australia) Priscilla Hon (Netherlands) Arantxa Rus	3	5

Qualifying competition
(Russia) Anna Kalinskaya (Slovakia) Viktória Kužmová	4	4
(Chile) Alexa Guarachi (New Zealand) Erin Routliffe	6	6

=== Third qualifier ===
First round
3	(Sweden) Cornelia Lister (United States) Sabrina Santamaria	3	6	3
(Russia) Anna Blinkova (Czech Republic) Markéta Vondroušová	6	4	6
(China) Han Xinyun (Thailand) Luksika Kumkhum	7	6
8	(Russia) Valeria Savinykh (Russia) Yana Sizikova	5	4

Qualifying competition
(Russia) Anna Blinkova (Czech Republic) Markéta Vondroušová	6	6^{1}	2
(China) Han Xinyun (Thailand) Luksika Kumkhum	4	7^{7}	6

=== Fourth qualifier ===
First round
4	(Spain) Georgina García Pérez (Hungary) Fanny Stollár	6	6
WC	(United Kingdom) Sarah Beth Grey (United Kingdom) Olivia Nicholls	4	3
(United States) Jamie Loeb (Sweden) Rebecca Peterson	6	6^{4}	3
7	(Australia) Arina Rodionova (Belgium) Maryna Zanevska	2	7^{7}	6

Qualifying competition
4	(Spain) Georgina García Pérez (Hungary) Fanny Stollár	6	4	2
7	(Australia) Arina Rodionova (Belgium) Maryna Zanevska	2	6	6
