= 2018 Wimbledon Championships – Men's doubles qualifying =

Men's doubles qualifying
- 2018 Wimbledon Championships

Events
Singles	men	women		boys	girls
Doubles	men	women	mixed	boys	girls
WC Singles	men	women	quad
WC Doubles	men	women	quad
Legends	men	women	seniors

Qualification
Singles	men	women
Doubles	men	women
- Wimbledon Championships

Players and pairs who neither have high enough rankings nor receive wild cards may participate in a qualifying tournament held one week before the annual Wimbledon Tennis Championships.

== Seeds ==
1. (Ukraine) Denys Molchanov / (Slovakia) Igor Zelenay (qualifying competition)
2. (Belgium) Sander Gillé / (Belgium) Joran Vliegen (qualifying competition)
3. (Germany) Andre Begemann / (Japan) Yasutaka Uchiyama (qualified)
4. (United States) Austin Krajicek / (India) Jeevan Nedunchezhiyan (qualified)
5. (Germany) Andreas Mies / (Germany) Kevin Krawietz (qualified)
6. (India) Sriram Balaji / (India) Vishnu Vardhan (qualified)
7. (Uruguay) Ariel Behar / (Chinese Taipei) Hsieh Cheng-peng (qualifying competition)
8. (Indonesia) Christopher Rungkat / (Austria) Tristan-Samuel Weissborn (first round)

== Qualifiers ==
1. (India) Sriram Balaji / (India) Vishnu Vardhan
2. (Germany) Andreas Mies / (Germany) Kevin Krawietz
3. (Germany) Andre Begemann / (Japan) Yasutaka Uchiyama
4. (United States) Austin Krajicek / (India) Jeevan Nedunchezhiyan

== Qualifying draw ==
=== First qualifier ===
First round
1	(Ukraine) Denys Molchanov (Slovakia) Igor Zelenay	3	6	16
(Belgium) Ruben Bemelmans (United States) Denis Kudla	6	4	14
(Peru) Sergio Galdós (Austria) Gerald Melzer	3	4
6	(India) Sriram Balaji (India) Vishnu Vardhan	6	6

Qualifying competition
1	(Ukraine) Denys Molchanov (Slovakia) Igor Zelenay	3	4
6	(India) Sriram Balaji (India) Vishnu Vardhan	6	6

=== Second qualifier ===
First round
2	(Belgium) Sander Gillé (Belgium) Joran Vliegen	6	6
(Thailand) Sanchai Ratiwatana (Thailand) Sonchat Ratiwatana	4	4
(Bolivia) Hugo Dellien (Portugal) Gonçalo Oliveira	1	6	3
5	(Germany) Kevin Krawietz (Germany) Andreas Mies	6	3	6

Qualifying competition
2	(Belgium) Sander Gillé (Belgium) Joran Vliegen	3	6^{3}
5	(Germany) Kevin Krawietz (Germany) Andreas Mies	6	7^{7}

=== Third qualifier ===
First round
3	(Germany) Andre Begemann (Japan) Yasutaka Uchiyama	7^{7}	6
(United States) Mackenzie McDonald (Canada) Peter Polansky	6^{5}	2
(Belarus) Aliaksandr Bury (Chinese Taipei) Peng Hsien-yin	3	6	4
7	(Uruguay) Ariel Behar (Chinese Taipei) Hsieh Cheng-peng	6	4	6

Qualifying competition
3	(Germany) Andre Begemann (Japan) Yasutaka Uchiyama	6	6^{4}	8
7	(Uruguay) Ariel Behar (Chinese Taipei) Hsieh Cheng-peng	4	7^{7}	6

=== Fourth qualifier ===
First round
4	(United States) Austin Krajicek (India) Jeevan Nedunchezhiyan	7^{7}	6
WC	(United Kingdom) Aidan McHugh (United Kingdom) Marcus Willis	6^{3}	3
WC	(United Kingdom) Edward Corrie (United Kingdom) Lloyd Glasspool	4	7	9
8	(Indonesia) Christopher Rungkat (Austria) Tristan-Samuel Weissborn	6	5	7

Qualifying competition
4	(United States) Austin Krajicek (India) Jeevan Nedunchezhiyan	7^{7}	6
WC	(United Kingdom) Edward Corrie (United Kingdom) Lloyd Glasspool	6^{5}	3
