= 2018 Wimbledon Championships – Women's singles qualifying =

Women's singles qualifying
- 2018 Wimbledon Championships

Events
Singles	men	women		boys	girls
Doubles	men	women	mixed	boys	girls
WC Singles	men	women	quad
WC Doubles	men	women	quad
Legends	men	women	seniors

Qualification
Singles	men	women
Doubles	men	women
- Wimbledon Championships

Players and pairs who neither have high enough rankings nor receive wild cards may participate in a qualifying tournament held one week before the annual Wimbledon Tennis Championships.

== Seeds ==
1. (Slovenia) Tamara Zidanšek (qualifying competition)
2. (Colombia) Mariana Duque Mariño (qualifying competition, lucky loser)
3. (Spain) Sara Sorribes Tormo (qualified)
4. (China) Duan Yingying (second round)
5. (United States) Nicole Gibbs (qualifying competition)
6. (United States) Caroline Dolehide (qualifying competition, lucky loser)
7. (Slovenia) Dalila Jakupović (second round)
8. (Germany) Mona Barthel (qualified)
9. (Russia) Evgeniya Rodina (qualified)
10. (Poland) Magdalena Fręch (first round)
11. (Belgium) Ysaline Bonaventure (second round)
12. (Montenegro) Danka Kovinić (first round)
13. (Australia) Arina Rodionova (second round)
14. (China) Han Xinyun (first round)
15. (Ukraine) Anhelina Kalinina (first round)
16. (Romania) Alexandra Dulgheru (qualified)
17. (Slovakia) Jana Čepelová (first round)
18. (China) Zhu Lin (first round)
19. (Bulgaria) Viktoriya Tomova (qualified)
20. (Canada) Carol Zhao (first round)
21. (Russia) Vitalia Diatchenko (qualified)
22. (Uzbekistan) Sabina Sharipova (second round)
23. (Ukraine) Marta Kostyuk (qualifying competition)
24. (United States) Irina Falconi (second round)

== Qualifiers ==
1. (Romania) Alexandra Dulgheru
2. (Canada) Eugenie Bouchard
3. (Spain) Sara Sorribes Tormo
4. (Germany) Antonia Lottner
5. (United States) Claire Liu
6. (Russia) Vera Zvonareva
7. (Bulgaria) Viktoriya Tomova
8. (Germany) Mona Barthel
9. (Russia) Evgeniya Rodina
10. (Romania) Elena-Gabriela Ruse
11. (Russia) Vitalia Diatchenko
12. (Czech Republic) Barbora Štefková

== Lucky losers ==
1. (Colombia) Mariana Duque Mariño
2. (United States) Caroline Dolehide

== Qualifying draw ==
=== First qualifier ===
First round
1	(Slovenia) Tamara Zidanšek	6	6
WC	(United Kingdom) Freya Christie	3	3
(China) Lu Jiajing	4	2
(Liechtenstein) Kathinka von Deichmann	6	6
(China) Lu Jingjing	6	6
(United States) Francesca Di Lorenzo	2	3
WC	(United Kingdom) Holly Fischer	0	1
16	(Romania) Alexandra Dulgheru	6	6

Second round
1	(Slovenia) Tamara Zidanšek	7	5	6
(Liechtenstein) Kathinka von Deichmann	5	7	2
(China) Lu Jingjing	5	6	2
16	(Romania) Alexandra Dulgheru	7	3	6

Qualifying competition
1	(Slovenia) Tamara Zidanšek	7	6^{4}	0
16	(Romania) Alexandra Dulgheru	5	7^{7}	6

=== Second qualifier ===
First round
2	(Colombia) Mariana Duque Mariño	6	6
(Mexico) Renata Zarazúa	4	0
(Japan) Junri Namigata	0	2
(Netherlands) Richèl Hogenkamp	6	6
(Czech Republic) Karolína Muchová	6	6
(Serbia) Ivana Jorović	3	4
(Canada) Eugenie Bouchard	6	6
18	(China) Zhu Lin	0	2

Second round
2	(Colombia) Mariana Duque Mariño	6	6
(Netherlands) Richèl Hogenkamp	4	1
(Czech Republic) Karolína Muchová	2	6	3
(Canada) Eugenie Bouchard	6	2	6

Qualifying competition
2	(Colombia) Mariana Duque Mariño	3	2
(Canada) Eugenie Bouchard	6	6

=== Third qualifier ===
First round
3	(Spain) Sara Sorribes Tormo	0	6	6
(Spain) Paula Badosa Gibert	6	3	4
(Netherlands) Lesley Kerkhove	3	0
(Czech Republic) Marie Bouzková	6	6
(Chile) Daniela Seguel	1	3
(United States) Kristie Ahn	6	6
(United States) Lauren Davis	3	3
23	(Ukraine) Marta Kostyuk	6	6

Second round
3	(Spain) Sara Sorribes Tormo	6	7^{7}
(Czech Republic) Marie Bouzková	2	6^{3}
(United States) Kristie Ahn	7^{7}	3	7
23	(Ukraine) Marta Kostyuk	6^{1}	6	9

Qualifying competition
3	(Spain) Sara Sorribes Tormo	7	7^{7}
23	(Ukraine) Marta Kostyuk	5	6^{5}

=== Fourth qualifier ===
First round
4	(China) Duan Yingying	6	6
(Turkey) Çağla Büyükakçay	0	3
(Canada) Bianca Andreescu	6	6
(United States) Grace Min	2	0
(Germany) Antonia Lottner	7	6
(Canada) Françoise Abanda	5	4
(Czech Republic) Tereza Martincová	2	2
24	(United States) Irina Falconi	6	6

Second round
4	(China) Duan Yingying	4	3
(Canada) Bianca Andreescu	6	6
(Germany) Antonia Lottner	6	1	6
24	(United States) Irina Falconi	0	6	3

Qualifying competition
(Canada) Bianca Andreescu	3	6^{5}
(Germany) Antonia Lottner	6	7^{7}

=== Fifth qualifier ===
First round
5	(United States) Nicole Gibbs	6	6
WC	(United Kingdom) Francesca Jones	4	2
(Belgium) Maryna Zanevska	2	3
(Italy) Martina Trevisan	6	6
(France) Amandine Hesse	0	0^{r}
WC	(United States) Claire Liu	6	2
(Australia) Lizette Cabrera	2	6	6
17	(Slovakia) Jana Čepelová	6	4	4

Second round
5	(United States) Nicole Gibbs	6	6
(Italy) Martina Trevisan	2	3
WC	(United States) Claire Liu	6	4	6
(Australia) Lizette Cabrera	4	6	1

Qualifying competition
5	(United States) Nicole Gibbs	4	3
WC	(United States) Claire Liu	6	6

=== Sixth qualifier ===
First round
6	(United States) Caroline Dolehide	6	7^{7}
(Japan) Miyu Kato	0	6^{3}
(Italy) Jessica Pieri	6	6
(Switzerland) Patty Schnyder	2	3
(Japan) Eri Hozumi	2	3
(Russia) Vera Zvonareva	6	6
(Italy) Jasmine Paolini	6^{6}	3
22	(Uzbekistan) Sabina Sharipova	7^{8}	6

Second round
6	(United States) Caroline Dolehide	6	6
(Italy) Jessica Pieri	2	3
(Russia) Vera Zvonareva	7^{7}	6
22	(Uzbekistan) Sabina Sharipova	6^{3}	2

Qualifying competition
6	(United States) Caroline Dolehide	2	3
(Russia) Vera Zvonareva	6	6

=== Seventh qualifier ===
First round
7	(Slovenia) Dalila Jakupović	6	6
(Japan) Miharu Imanishi	2	2
(Germany) Sabine Lisicki	4	6^{3}
(Russia) Anna Kalinskaya	6	7^{7}
(Japan) Ayano Shimizu	4	7	6
(Germany) Tamara Korpatsch	6	5	1
(Australia) Jaimee Fourlis	3	6	4
19	(Bulgaria) Viktoriya Tomova	6	2	6

Second round
7	(Slovenia) Dalila Jakupović	2	6^{4}
(Russia) Anna Kalinskaya	6	7^{7}
(Japan) Ayano Shimizu	3	6	0
19	(Bulgaria) Viktoriya Tomova	6	4	6

Qualifying competition
(Russia) Anna Kalinskaya	4	7^{7}	3
19	(Bulgaria) Viktoriya Tomova	6	6^{5}	6

=== Eighth qualifier ===
First round
8	(Germany) Mona Barthel	5	6	6
(Hungary) Fanny Stollár	7	3	4
PR	(Serbia) Bojana Jovanovski Petrović	3	2
(France) Océane Dodin	6	6
(United States) Jamie Loeb	1	7	6
(Bulgaria) Elitsa Kostova	6	5	1
(Australia) Priscilla Hon	6	7^{7}
15	(Ukraine) Anhelina Kalinina	3	6^{3}

Second round
8	(Germany) Mona Barthel	6	1	8
(France) Océane Dodin	3	6	6
(United States) Jamie Loeb	6	6
(Australia) Priscilla Hon	4	4

Qualifying competition
8	(Germany) Mona Barthel	7	6
(United States) Jamie Loeb	5	1

=== Ninth qualifier ===
First round
9	(Russia) Evgeniya Rodina	6	6
(China) Liu Fangzhou	1	0
(Russia) Valentyna Ivakhnenko	6	3	8
(Russia) Irina Khromacheva	3	6	10
(Japan) Mayo Hibi	1	6	6
(Bulgaria) Sesil Karatantcheva	6	3	1
(Italy) Deborah Chiesa	6	5	6
20	(Canada) Carol Zhao	2	7	3

Second round
9	(Russia) Evgeniya Rodina	7^{9}	6
(Russia) Irina Khromacheva	6^{7}	2
(Japan) Mayo Hibi	6	6
(Italy) Deborah Chiesa	3	1

Qualifying competition
9	(Russia) Evgeniya Rodina	6	6
(Japan) Mayo Hibi	2	4

=== Tenth qualifier ===
First round
10	(Poland) Magdalena Fręch	3	2
(Ukraine) Dayana Yastremska	6	6
(Netherlands) Bibiane Schoofs	6	4	5
(Austria) Barbara Haas	3	6	7
(Romania) Alexandra Cadanțu	6	4	1
(Romania) Elena-Gabriela Ruse	3	6	6
(Romania) Jaqueline Cristian	1	6^{5}
13	(Australia) Arina Rodionova	6	7^{7}

Second round
(Ukraine) Dayana Yastremska	4	2
(Austria) Barbara Haas	6	6
(Romania) Elena-Gabriela Ruse	5	6	6
13	(Australia) Arina Rodionova	7	4	4

Qualifying competition
(Austria) Barbara Haas	0	5
(Romania) Elena-Gabriela Ruse	6	7

=== Eleventh qualifier ===
First round
11	(Belgium) Ysaline Bonaventure	6	4	6
(Spain) Sílvia Soler Espinosa	2	6	2
(Russia) Sofya Zhuk	6	6
(Greece) Valentini Grammatikopoulou	3	2
(India) Ankita Raina	6	6
WC	(United Kingdom) Maia Lumsden	2	1
WC	(United Kingdom) Samantha Murray	1	1
21	(Russia) Vitalia Diatchenko	6	6

Second round
11	(Belgium) Ysaline Bonaventure	5	6^{5}
(Russia) Sofya Zhuk	7	7^{7}
(India) Ankita Raina	2	7	4
21	(Russia) Vitalia Diatchenko	6	5	6

Qualifying competition
(Russia) Sofya Zhuk	2	2
21	(Russia) Vitalia Diatchenko	6	6

=== Twelfth qualifier ===
First round
12	(Montenegro) Danka Kovinić	2	2
(Switzerland) Conny Perrin	6	6
(Romania) Irina Bara	6	6
WC	(United Kingdom) Tara Moore	4	2
WC	(United Kingdom) Emma Raducanu	4	7	2
PR	(Czech Republic) Barbora Štefková	6	5	6
(Russia) Veronika Kudermetova	6	6
14	(China) Han Xinyun	2	2

Second round
(Switzerland) Conny Perrin	6	6
(Romania) Irina Bara	3	4
PR	(Czech Republic) Barbora Štefková	2	6	6
(Russia) Veronika Kudermetova	6	4	1

Qualifying competition
(Switzerland) Conny Perrin	6	4	4
PR	(Czech Republic) Barbora Štefková	4	6	6
