= 2018 Wimbledon Championships – Day-by-day summaries =

The 2018 Wimbledon Championships are described below in detail, in the form of day-by-day summaries.

All dates are BST (UTC+1).

== Day 1 (2 July) ==
- Seeds out:
  - Gentlemen's Singles: (Bulgaria) Grigor Dimitrov [6], (Croatia) Borna Ćorić [16], (France) Richard Gasquet [23], (Serbia) Filip Krajinović [28], (Argentina) Leonardo Mayer [32]
  - Ladies' Singles: (United States) Sloane Stephens [4], (Ukraine) Elina Svitolina [5], (United States) CoCo Vandeweghe [16], (Slovakia) Magdaléna Rybáriková [19], (Latvia) Anastasija Sevastova [21], (China) Zhang Shuai [31]
- Schedule of play

Matches on main courts
Matches on Centre Court
Event	Winner	Loser	Score
Gentlemen's Singles 1st Round	(Switzerland) Roger Federer [1]	(Serbia) Dušan Lajović	6–1, 6–3, 6–4
Ladies' Singles 1st Round	(Denmark) Caroline Wozniacki [2]	(United States) Varvara Lepchenko	6–0, 6–3
Gentlemen's Singles 1st Round	(Switzerland) Stan Wawrinka	(Bulgaria) Grigor Dimitrov [6]	1–6, 7–6^{(7–3)}, 7–6^{(7–5)}, 6–4
Matches on No. 1 Court
Event	Winner	Loser	Score
Ladies' Singles 1st Round	(Croatia) Donna Vekić	(United States) Sloane Stephens [4]	6–1, 6–3
Gentlemen's Singles 1st Round	(Canada) Milos Raonic [13]	(United Kingdom) Liam Broady [WC]	7–5, 6–0, 6–1
Ladies' Singles 1st Round	(United States) Serena Williams [25/PR]	(Netherlands) Arantxa Rus	7–5, 6–3
Ladies' Singles 1st Round	(Poland) Agnieszka Radwańska [32]	(Romania) Elena-Gabriela Ruse [Q]	6–3, 4–6, 7–5
Matches on No. 2 Court
Event	Winner	Loser	Score
Gentlemen's Singles 1st Round	(Croatia) Marin Čilić [3]	(Japan) Yoshihito Nishioka [PR]	6–1, 6–4, 6–4
Ladies' Singles 1st Round	(United States) Venus Williams [9]	(Sweden) Johanna Larsson	6–7^{(3–7)}, 6–2, 6–1
Gentlemen's Singles 1st Round	(France) Gaël Monfils	(France) Richard Gasquet [23]	7–6^{(8–6)}, 7–5, 6–4
Ladies' Singles 1st Round	(Germany) Tatjana Maria	(Ukraine) Elina Svitolina [5]	7–6^{(7–3)}, 4–6, 6–1
Matches on No. 3 Court
Event	Winner	Loser	Score
Gentlemen's Singles 1st Round	(United States) Sam Querrey [11]	(Australia) Jordan Thompson	6–2, 6–4, 6–3
Ladies' Singles 1st Round	(United States) Madison Keys [10]	(Australia) Ajla Tomljanović	6–4, 6–2
Gentlemen's Singles 1st Round	(United States) John Isner [9]	(Germany) Yannick Maden [Q]	6–2, 7–6^{(7–4)}, 7–5
Ladies' Singles 1st Round	(Czech Republic) Kateřina Siniaková	(United States) CoCo Vandeweghe [16]	6–7^{(3–7)}, 6–3, 8–6

== Day 2 (3 July) ==
- Seeds out:
  - Gentlemen's Singles: (Austria) Dominic Thiem [7], (Belgium) David Goffin [10], (United States) Jack Sock [18], (Spain) Pablo Carreño Busta [20], (Italy) Marco Cecchinato [29], (Spain) Fernando Verdasco [30]
  - Ladies' Singles: (France) Caroline Garcia [6], (Czech Republic) Petra Kvitová [8], (Russia) Maria Sharapova [24], (Russia) Anastasia Pavlyuchenkova [30]
- Schedule of play

Matches on main courts
Matches on Centre Court
Event	Winner	Loser	Score
Ladies' Singles 1st Round	(Spain) Garbiñe Muguruza [3]	(United Kingdom) Naomi Broady [WC]	6–2, 7–5
Gentlemen's Singles 1st Round	(Spain) Rafael Nadal [2]	(Israel) Dudi Sela	6–3, 6–3, 6–2
Ladies' Singles 1st Round	(Romania) Simona Halep [1]	(Japan) Kurumi Nara	6–2, 6–4
Ladies' Singles 1st Round	(Latvia) Jeļena Ostapenko [12]	(United Kingdom) Katy Dunne [WC]	6–3, 7–6^{(7–5)}
Matches on No. 1 Court
Event	Winner	Loser	Score
Gentlemen's Singles 1st Round	(United Kingdom) Kyle Edmund [21]	(Australia) Alex Bolt [Q]	6–2, 6–3, 7–5
Ladies' Singles 1st Round	(Belarus) Aliaksandra Sasnovich	(Czech Republic) Petra Kvitová [8]	6–4, 4–6, 6–0
Gentlemen's Singles 1st Round	(Serbia) Novak Djokovic [12]	(United States) Tennys Sandgren	6–3, 6–1, 6–2
Matches on No. 2 Court
Event	Winner	Loser	Score
Ladies' Singles 1st Round	(United Kingdom) Johanna Konta [22]	(Russia) Natalia Vikhlyantseva	7–5, 7–6^{(9–7)}
Gentlemen's Singles 1st Round	(Germany) Alexander Zverev [4]	(Australia) James Duckworth [PR]	7–5, 6–2, 6–0
Gentlemen's Singles 1st Round	(Cyprus) Marcos Baghdatis	(Austria) Dominic Thiem [7]	6–4, 7–5, 2–0, retired
Ladies' Singles 1st Round	(Russia) Vitalia Diatchenko [Q]	(Russia) Maria Sharapova [24]	6–7^{(3–7)}, 7–6^{(7–3)}, 6–4
Matches on No. 3 Court
Event	Winner	Loser	Score
Gentlemen's Singles 1st Round	(Argentina) Juan Martín del Potro [5]	(Germany) Peter Gojowczyk	6–3, 6–4, 6–3
Ladies' Singles 1st Round	(Germany) Angelique Kerber [11]	(Russia) Vera Zvonareva [Q]	7–5, 6–3
Gentlemen's Singles 1st Round	(Australia) Matthew Ebden	(Belgium) David Goffin [10]	6–4, 6–3, 6–4
Ladies' Singles 1st Round	(Switzerland) Belinda Bencic	(France) Caroline Garcia [6]	7–6^{(7–2)}, 6–3

== Day 3 (4 July) ==
- Seeds out:
  - Gentlemen's Singles: (France) Lucas Pouille [17]
  - Ladies' Singles: (Denmark) Caroline Wozniacki [2], (Poland) Agnieszka Radwańska [32]
  - Gentlemen's Doubles: (Croatia) Ivan Dodig / (United States) Rajeev Ram [10]
- Schedule of play

Matches on main courts
Matches on Centre Court
Event	Winner	Loser	Score
Ladies' Singles 2nd Round	(Czech Republic) Karolína Plíšková [7]	(Belarus) Victoria Azarenka	6–3, 6–3
Gentlemen's Singles 2nd Round	(Switzerland) Roger Federer [1]	(Slovakia) Lukáš Lacko	6–4, 6–4, 6–1
Ladies' Singles 2nd Round	(United States) Serena Williams [25/PR]	(Bulgaria) Viktoriya Tomova [Q]	6–1, 6–4
Ladies' Singles 2nd Round	(France) Kristina Mladenovic	(Germany) Tatjana Maria	6–2, 6–2
Matches on No. 1 Court
Event	Winner	Loser	Score
Ladies' Singles 2nd Round	(United States) Venus Williams [9]	(Romania) Alexandra Dulgheru [Q]	4–6, 6–0, 6–1
Ladies' Singles 2nd Round	(Russia) Ekaterina Makarova	(Denmark) Caroline Wozniacki [2]	6–4, 1–6, 7–5
Gentlemen's Singles 2nd Round	(Croatia) Marin Čilić [3] vs (Argentina) Guido Pella		6–3, 6–1, 3–4, suspended
Matches on No. 2 Court
Event	Winner	Loser	Score
Gentlemen's Singles 2nd Round	(Canada) Milos Raonic [13]	(Australia) John Millman	7–6^{(7–4)}, 7–6^{(7–4)}, 7–6^{(7–4)}
Ladies' Singles 2nd Round	(Czech Republic) Lucie Šafářová	(Poland) Agnieszka Radwańska [32]	7–5, 6–4
Gentlemen's Singles 2nd Round	(Italy) Andreas Seppi vs (South Africa) Kevin Anderson [8]		3–6, 7–6^{(7–5)}, 3–6, 1–1, suspended
Matches on No. 3 Court
Event	Winner	Loser	Score
Ladies' Singles 2nd Round	(Romania) Mihaela Buzărnescu [29]	(United Kingdom) Katie Swan [WC]	6–0, 6–3
Gentlemen's Singles 2nd Round	(France) Gaël Monfils	(Italy) Paolo Lorenzi	3–6, 6–3, 7–6^{(7–5)}, 7–6^{(7–3)}
Gentlemen's Singles 2nd Round	(Italy) Thomas Fabbiano [Q] vs (Switzerland) Stan Wawrinka		7–6^{(9–7)}, 6–3, 5–6, suspended

== Day 4 (5 July) ==
- Seeds out:
  - Gentlemen's Singles: (Croatia) Marin Čilić [3], (Argentina) Diego Schwartzman [14], (Canada) Denis Shapovalov [26], (Bosnia and Herzegovina) Damir Džumhur [27]
  - Ladies' Singles: (Spain) Garbiñe Muguruza [3], (United Kingdom) Johanna Konta [22]
  - Gentlemen's Doubles: (Finland) Henri Kontinen / (Australia) John Peers [3], (Belarus) Max Mirnyi / (Austria) Philipp Oswald [16]
  - Ladies' Doubles: (Ukraine) Lyudmyla Kichenok / (Russia) Alla Kudryavtseva [16]
- Schedule of play

Matches on main courts
Matches on Centre Court
Event	Winner	Loser	Score
Gentlemen's Singles 2nd Round	(Spain) Rafael Nadal [2]	(Kazakhstan) Mikhail Kukushkin	6–4, 6–3, 6–4
Ladies' Singles 2nd Round	(Slovakia) Dominika Cibulková	(United Kingdom) Johanna Konta [22]	6–3, 6–4
Gentlemen's Singles 2nd Round	(United Kingdom) Kyle Edmund [21]	(United States) Bradley Klahn [Q]	6–4, 7–6^{(7–0)}, 6–2
Matches on No. 1 Court
Event	Winner	Loser	Score
Gentlemen's Singles 2nd Round	(Argentina) Guido Pella	(Croatia) Marin Čilić [3]	3–6, 1–6, 6–4, 7–6^{(7–3)}, 7–5
Ladies' Singles 2nd Round	(Romania) Simona Halep [1]	(China) Zheng Saisai [PR]	7–5, 6–0
Gentlemen's Singles 2nd Round	(Argentina) Juan Martin Del Potro [5]	(Spain) Feliciano López	6–4, 6–1, 6–2
Gentlemen's Singles 2nd Round	(United States) Taylor Fritz vs (Germany) Alexander Zverev [4]		4–6, 7–5, 7–6^{(7–0)}, suspended
Matches on No. 2 Court
Event	Winner	Loser	Score
Ladies' Singles 2nd Round	(Japan) Naomi Osaka [18]	(United Kingdom) Katie Boulter [WC]	6–3, 6–4
Gentlemen's Singles 2nd Round	(South Africa) Kevin Anderson [8]	(Italy) Andreas Seppi	6–3, 6–7^{(5–7)}, 6–3, 6–4
Gentlemen's Singles 2nd Round	(Serbia) Novak Djokovic [12]	(Argentina) Horacio Zeballos	6–1, 6–2, 6–3
Gentlemen's Singles 2nd Round	(Japan) Kei Nishikori [24]	(Australia) Bernard Tomic [LL]	2–6, 6–3, 7–6^{(9–7)}, 7–5
Ladies' Singles 2nd Round	(Belgium) Alison Van Uytvanck	(Spain) Garbiñe Muguruza [3]	5–7, 6–2, 6–1
Matches on No. 3 Court
Event	Winner	Loser	Score
Ladies' Singles 2nd Round	(Australia) Ashleigh Barty [17]	(Canada) Eugenie Bouchard [Q]	6–4, 7–5
Gentlemen's Singles 2nd Round	(Italy) Thomas Fabbiano [Q]	(Switzerland) Stan Wawrinka	7–6^{(9–7)}, 6–3, 7–6^{(8–6)}
Gentlemen's Singles 2nd Round	(Australia) Nick Kyrgios [15]	(Netherlands) Robin Haase	6–3, 6–4, 7–5
Gentlemen's Singles 2nd Round	(France) Benoît Paire	(Canada) Denis Shapovalov [26]	0–6, 6–2, 6–4, 7–6^{(7–3)}
Ladies' Singles 2nd Round	(Latvia) Jeļena Ostapenko [12]	(Belgium) Kirsten Flipkens	6–1, 6–3

== Day 5 (6 July) ==
- Seeds out:
  - Gentlemen's Singles: (United States) Sam Querrey [11], (Germany) Philipp Kohlschreiber [25]
  - Ladies' Singles: (United States) Venus Williams [9], (United States) Madison Keys [10], (Czech Republic) Barbora Strýcová [23], (Romania) Mihaela Buzărnescu [29]
  - Gentlemen's Doubles: (Austria) Oliver Marach / (Croatia) Mate Pavić [1], (Poland) Łukasz Kubot / (Brazil) Marcelo Melo [2], (Pakistan) Aisam-ul-Haq Qureshi / (Netherlands) Jean-Julien Rojer [9], (Uruguay) Pablo Cuevas / (Spain) Marcel Granollers [11], (India) Rohan Bopanna / (France) Édouard Roger-Vasselin [12]
  - Ladies' Doubles: (Chinese Taipei) Latisha Chan / (China) Peng Shuai [5], (Chinese Taipei) Chan Hao-ching / (China) Yang Zhaoxuan [7], (United States) Raquel Atawo / (Germany) Anna-Lena Grönefeld [11]
- Schedule of play

Matches on main courts
Matches on Centre Court
Event	Winner	Loser	Score
Gentlemen's Singles 3rd Round	(France) Gael Monfils	(United States) Sam Querrey [11]	5–7, 6–4, 6–4, 6–2
Ladies' Singles 3rd Round	(United States) Serena Williams [25/PR]	(France) Kristina Mladenovic	7–5, 7–6^{(7–2)}
Gentlemen's Singles 3rd Round	(Switzerland) Roger Federer [1]	(Germany) Jan-Lennard Struff	6–3, 7–5, 6–2
Matches on No. 1 Court
Event	Winner	Loser	Score
Gentlemen's Singles 2nd Round	(Germany) Alexander Zverev [4]	(United States) Taylor Fritz	6–4, 5–7, 6–7^{(0–7)}, 6–1, 6–2
Ladies' Singles 3rd Round	(Netherlands) Kiki Bertens [20]	(United States) Venus Williams [9]	6–2, 6–7^{(5–7)}, 8–6
Ladies' Singles 3rd Round	(Czech Republic) Karolína Plíšková [7]	(Romania) Mihaela Buzărnescu [29]	3–6, 7–6^{(7–3)}, 6–1
Matches on No. 2 Court
Event	Winner	Loser	Score
Gentlemen's Singles 3rd Round	(South Africa) Kevin Anderson [8]	(Germany) Philipp Kohlschreiber [25]	6–3, 7–5, 7–5
Ladies' Singles 3rd Round	(Germany) Julia Görges [13]	(Czech Republic) Barbora Strýcová [23]	7–6^{(7–3)}, 3–6, 10–8
Gentlemen's Singles 3rd Round	(United States) John Isner [9]	(Moldova) Radu Albot	6–3, 6–3, 6–4
Matches on No. 3 Court
Event	Winner	Loser	Score
Ladies' Singles 3rd Round	(Russia) Evgeniya Rodina [Q]	(United States) Madison Keys [10]	7–5, 5–7, 6–4
Ladies' Singles 3rd Round	(Croatia) Donna Vekić	(Belgium) Yanina Wickmayer	7–6^{(7–2)}, 6–1
Gentlemen's Singles 3rd Round	(France) Adrian Mannarino [22]	(Russia) Daniil Medvedev	6–4, 6–3, 4–6, 5–7, 6–3

== Day 6 (7 July) ==
- Seeds out:
  - Gentlemen's Singles: (Germany) Alexander Zverev [4], (Australia) Nick Kyrgios [15], (Italy) Fabio Fognini [19], (United Kingdom) Kyle Edmund [21]
  - Ladies' Singles: (Romania) Simona Halep [1], (Belgium) Elise Mertens [15], (Australia) Ashleigh Barty [17], (Japan) Naomi Osaka [18], (Australia) Daria Gavrilova [26], (Spain) Carla Suárez Navarro [27], (Estonia) Anett Kontaveit [28]
  - Gentlemen's Doubles: (France) Pierre-Hugues Herbert / (France) Nicolas Mahut [4]
  - Mixed Doubles: (Brazil) Marcelo Demoliner / (Spain) María José Martínez Sánchez [15]
- Schedule of play

Matches on main courts
Matches on Centre Court
Event	Winner	Loser	Score
Gentlemen's Singles 3rd Round	(Spain) Rafael Nadal [2]	(Australia) Alex de Minaur	6–1, 6–2, 6–4
Ladies' Singles 3rd Round	(Germany) Angelique Kerber [11]	(Japan) Naomi Osaka [18]	6–2, 6–4
Gentlemen's Singles 3rd Round	(Serbia) Novak Djokovic [12]	(United Kingdom) Kyle Edmund [21]	4–6, 6–3, 6–2, 6–4
Matches on No. 1 Court
Event	Winner	Loser	Score
Ladies' Singles 3rd Round	(Chinese Taipei) Hsieh Su-wei	(Romania) Simona Halep [1]	3–6, 6–4, 7–5
Gentlemen's Singles 3rd Round	(Latvia) Ernests Gulbis [Q]	(Germany) Alexander Zverev [4]	7–6^{(7–2)}, 4–6, 5–7, 6–3, 6–0
Gentlemen's Singles 3rd Round	(Japan) Kei Nishikori [24]	(Australia) Nick Kyrgios [15]	6–1, 7–6^{(7–3)}, 6–4
Matches on No. 2 Court
Event	Winner	Loser	Score
Gentlemen's Singles 3rd Round	(Argentina) Juan Martín del Potro [5]	(France) Benoît Paire	6–4, 7–6^{(7–4)}, 6–3
Ladies' Singles 3rd Round	(Slovakia) Dominika Cibulková	(Belgium) Elise Mertens [15]	6–2, 6–2
Gentlemen's Doubles 2nd Round	(United Kingdom) Jamie Murray [5] (Brazil) Bruno Soares [5]	(Australia) Matthew Ebden (United States) Taylor Fritz	7–5, 6–3, 6–1
Matches on No. 3 Court
Event	Winner	Loser	Score
Ladies' Singles 3rd Round	(Russia) Daria Kasatkina [14]	(Australia) Ashleigh Barty [17]	7–5, 6–3
Ladies' Singles 3rd Round	(Latvia) Jeļena Ostapenko [12]	(Russia) Vitalia Diatchenko [Q]	6–0, 6–4
Gentlemen's Singles 3rd Round	(Czech Republic) Jiří Veselý	(Italy) Fabio Fognini [19]	7–6^{(7–4)}, 3–6, 6–3, 6–2
Mixed Doubles 2nd Round	(United States) Jack Sock (United States) Sloane Stephens	(Brazil) Marcelo Demoliner [15] (Spain) María José Martínez Sánchez [15]	7–5, 6–2
Mixed Doubles 1st Round	(United Kingdom) Jamie Murray (Belarus) Victoria Azarenka	(Czech Republic) Roman Jebavý [Alt] (Czech Republic) Lucie Hradecká [Alt]	6–7^{(2–7)}, 6–4, 6–4

== Middle Sunday (8 July) ==
Following tradition, Middle Sunday is a day of rest and no matches are played.

== Day 7 (9 July) ==
- Seeds out:
  - Gentlemen's Singles: (France) Adrian Mannarino [22], (Greece) Stefanos Tsitsipas [31]
  - Ladies' Singles: (Czech Republic) Karolína Plíšková [7]
  - Gentlemen's Doubles: (Colombia) Juan Sebastián Cabal / (Colombia) Robert Farah [6], (Croatia) Nikola Mektić / (Austria) Alexander Peya [8]
  - Ladies' Doubles: (Czech Republic) Andrea Sestini Hlaváčková / (Czech Republic) Barbora Strýcová [2], (Slovenia) Andreja Klepač / (Spain) María José Martínez Sánchez [4], (Belgium) Elise Mertens / (Netherlands) Demi Schuurs [8], (Netherlands) Kiki Bertens / (Sweden) Johanna Larsson [9], (Belgium) Kirsten Flipkens / (Romania) Monica Niculescu [13], (Czech Republic) Lucie Hradecká / (Chinese Taipei) Hsieh Su-wei [14], (United States) Vania King / (Slovenia) Katarina Srebotnik [17]
  - Mixed Doubles: (Colombia) Robert Farah / (Germany) Anna-Lena Grönefeld [7], (Belarus) Max Mirnyi / (Czech Republic) Květa Peschke [13]
- Schedule of play

Matches on main courts
Matches on Centre Court
Event	Winner	Loser	Score
Gentlemen's Singles 4th Round	(Switzerland) Roger Federer [1]	(France) Adrian Mannarino [22]	6–0, 7–5, 6–4
Ladies' Singles 4th Round	(United States) Serena Williams [25/PR]	(Russia) Evgeniya Rodina [Q]	6–2, 6–2
Gentlemen's Singles 4th Round	(Spain) Rafael Nadal [2]	(Czech Republic) Jiří Veselý	6–3, 6–3, 6–4
Mixed Doubles 2nd Round	(United Kingdom) Jamie Murray (Belarus) Victoria Azarenka	(Colombia) Robert Farah [7] (Germany) Anna-Lena Grönefeld [7]	7–6^{(8–6)}, 6–7^{(6–8)}, 7–5
Matches on No. 1 Court
Event	Winner	Loser	Score
Ladies' Singles 4th Round	(Germany) Angelique Kerber [11]	(Switzerland) Belinda Bencic	6–3, 7–6^{(7–5)}
Gentlemen's Singles 4th Round	(South Africa) Kevin Anderson [8]	(France) Gaël Monfils	7–6^{(7–4)}, 7–6^{(7–2)}, 5–7, 7–6^{(7–4)}
Gentlemen's Singles 4th Round	(Serbia) Novak Djokovic [12]	(Russia) Karen Khachanov	6–4, 6–2, 6–2
Matches on No. 2 Court
Event	Winner	Loser	Score
Ladies' Singles 4th Round	(Netherlands) Kiki Bertens [20]	(Czech Republic) Karolína Plíšková [7]	6–3, 7–6^{(7–1)}
Gentlemen's Singles 4th Round	(Japan) Kei Nishikori [24]	(Latvia) Ernests Gulbis [Q]	4–6, 7–6^{(7–5)}, 7–6^{(12–10)}, 6–1
Gentlemen's Singles 4th Round	(Argentina) Juan Martín del Potro [5] vs (France) Gilles Simon		7–6^{(7–1)}, 7–6^{(7–5)}, 5–7, suspended
Matches on No. 3 Court
Event	Winner	Loser	Score
Ladies' Singles 4th Round	(Latvia) Jeļena Ostapenko [12]	(Belarus) Aliaksandra Sasnovich	7–6^{(7–4)}, 6–0
Ladies' Singles 4th Round	(Germany) Julia Görges [13]	(Croatia) Donna Vekić	6–3, 6–2
Gentlemen's Singles 4th Round	(United States) John Isner [9]	(Greece) Stefanos Tsitsipas [31]	6–4, 7–6^{(10–8)}, 7–6^{(7–4)}
Mixed Doubles 2nd Round	(United Kingdom) Jay Clarke [WC] (United Kingdom) Harriet Dart [WC]	(Belarus) Max Mirnyi [13] (Czech Republic) Květa Peschke [13]	6–2, 4–6, 6–4
Mixed Doubles 2nd Round	(Finland) Henri Kontinen [6] (United Kingdom) Heather Watson [6]	(Poland) Marcin Matkowski (Romania) Mihaela Buzărnescu	6–2, 5–7, 7–5

== Day 8 (10 July) ==
- Seeds out:
  - Ladies' Singles: (Russia) Daria Kasatkina [14], (Netherlands) Kiki Bertens [20]
  - Gentlemen's Doubles: (United Kingdom) Jamie Murray / (Brazil) Bruno Soares [5], (Japan) Ben McLachlan / (Germany) Jan-Lennard Struff [14]
  - Mixed Doubles: (Croatia) Mate Pavić / (Canada) Gabriela Dabrowski [1], (France) Édouard Roger-Vasselin / (Czech Republic) Andrea Sestini Hlaváčková [6], (Finland) Henri Kontinen / (United Kingdom) Heather Watson [16]
- Schedule of play

Matches on main courts
Matches on Centre Court
Event	Winner	Loser	Score
Ladies' Singles Quarterfinals	(Germany) Angelique Kerber [11]	(Russia) Daria Kasatkina [14]	6–3, 7–5
Ladies' Singles Quarterfinals	(United States) Serena Williams [25/PR]	(Italy) Camila Giorgi	3–6, 6–3, 6–4
Gentlemen's Doubles Quarterfinals	(South Africa) Raven Klaasen [13] (New Zealand) Michael Venus [13]	(United Kingdom) Jamie Murray [5] (Brazil) Bruno Soares [5]	6–7^{(5–7)}, 7–6^{(7–5)}, 5–7, 7–6^{(7–4)}, 6–4
Matches on No. 1 Court
Event	Winner	Loser	Score
Ladies' Singles Quarterfinals	(Latvia) Jeļena Ostapenko [12]	(Slovakia) Dominika Cibulková	7–5, 6–4
Ladies' Singles Quarterfinals	(Germany) Julia Görges [13]	(Netherlands) Kiki Bertens [20]	3–6, 7–5, 6–1
Gentlemen's Doubles Quarterfinals	(United Kingdom) Dominic Inglot [15] (Croatia) Franko Škugor [15]	(Netherlands) Robin Haase (Sweden) Robert Lindstedt	6–3, 6–7^{(2–7)}, 7–6^{(7–1)}, 6–4
Matches on No. 2 Court
Event	Winner	Loser	Score
Senior Gentlemen's Invitation Doubles Round Roblin	(Netherlands) Richard Krajicek (United Kingdom) Mark Petchey	(United States) Patrick McEnroe (United States) Jeff Tarango	6–4, 6–2
Gentlemen's Singles 4th Round	(Argentina) Juan Martín del Potro [5]	(France) Gilles Simon	7–6^{(7–1)}, 7–6^{(7–5)}, 5–7, 7–6^{(7–5)}
Gentlemen's Doubles Quarterfinals	(Denmark) Frederik Nielsen [WC] (United Kingdom) Joe Salisbury [WC]	(Japan) Ben McLachlan [14] (Germany) Jan-Lennard Struff [14]	7–6^{(8–6)}, 4–6, 7–6^{(7–2)}, 7–6^{(7–4)}
Ladies' Invitation Doubles Round Roblin	(China) Li Na (Japan) Ai Sugiyama	(United States) Tracy Austin (United Kingdom) Anne Keothavong	6–1, 6–4
Matches on No. 3 Court
Event	Winner	Loser	Score
Senior Gentlemen's Invitation Doubles Round Roblin	(Netherlands) Jacco Eltingh (Netherlands) Paul Haarhuis	(Iran) Mansour Bahrami (Croatia) Goran Ivanišević	6–4, 6–3
Mixed Doubles 3rd Round	(Austria) Alexander Peya [11] (United States) Nicole Melichar [11]	(France) Édouard Roger-Vasselin [6] (Czech Republic) Andrea Sestini Hlaváčková [6]	7–6^{(7–5)}, 4–6, 9–7
Gentlemen's Doubles Quarterfinals	(United States) Mike Bryan [7] (United States) Jack Sock [7]	(India) Divij Sharan (Australia) Artem Sitak	7–6^{(7–4)}, 7–6^{(7–5)}, 6–7^{(3–7)} 6–4
Mixed Doubles 3rd Round	(Croatia) Ivan Dodig [3] (Chinese Taipei) Latisha Chan [3]	(Finland) Henri Kontinen [16] (United Kingdom) Heather Watson [16]	6–2, 7–6^{(7–4)}

== Day 9 (11 July) ==
- Seeds out:
  - Gentlemen's Singles: (Switzerland) Roger Federer [1], (Argentina) Juan Martín del Potro [5], (Canada) Milos Raonic [13], (Japan) Kei Nishikori [24]
  - Ladies' Doubles: (Hungary) Tímea Babos / (France) Kristina Mladenovic [1], (Romania) Irina-Camelia Begu / (Romania) Mihaela Buzărnescu [15]
  - Mixed Doubles: (Croatia) Nikola Mektić / (Chinese Taipei) Chan Hao-ching [5], (Netherlands) Matwé Middelkoop / (Sweden) Johanna Larsson [12]
- Schedule of play

Matches on main courts
Matches on Centre Court
Event	Winner	Loser	Score
Gentlemen's Singles Quarterfinals	(Serbia) Novak Djokovic [12]	(Japan) Kei Nishikori [24]	6–3, 3–6, 6–2, 6–2
Gentlemen's Singles Quarterfinals	(Spain) Rafael Nadal [2]	(Argentina) Juan Martín del Potro [5]	7–5, 6–7^{(7–9)}, 4–6, 6–4, 6–4
Matches on No. 1 Court
Event	Winner	Loser	Score
Gentlemen's Singles Quarterfinals	(South Africa) Kevin Anderson [8]	(Switzerland) Roger Federer [1]	2–6, 6–7^{(5–7)}, 7–5, 6–4, 13–11
Gentlemen's Singles Quarterfinals	(United States) John Isner [9]	(Canada) Milos Raonic [13]	6–7^{(5–7)}, 7–6^{(9–7)}, 6–4, 6–3
Matches on No. 2 Court
Event	Winner	Loser	Score
Ladies's Doubles Quarterfinals	(Poland) Alicja Rosolska (United States) Abigail Spears	(Hungary) Tímea Babos [1] (France) Kristina Mladenovic [1]	7–6^{(7–4)}, 6–3
Ladies's Doubles Quarterfinals	(Czech Republic) Barbora Krejčíková [3] (Czech Republic) Kateřina Siniaková [3]	(Germany) Tatjana Maria (United Kingdom) Heather Watson	3–6, 7–6^{(7–5)}, 6–4
Mixed Doubles 3rd Round	(United Kingdom) Jamie Murray (Belarus) Victoria Azarenka	(Netherlands) Matwé Middelkoop [12] (Sweden) Johanna Larsson [12]	7–6^{(8–6)}, 6–3
Mixed Doubles 3rd Round	(Colombia) Juan Sebastián Cabal [10] (United States) Abigail Spears [10]	(Netherlands) Robin Haase (Belgium) Kirsten Flipkens	6–3, 6–4
Matches on No. 3 Court
Event	Winner	Loser	Score
Ladies's Doubles Quarterfinals	(United States) Nicole Melichar [12] (Czech Republic) Květa Peschke [12]	(Romania) Irina-Camelia Begu [15] (Romania) Mihaela Buzărnescu [15]	5–7, 6–4, 6–4
Ladies's Doubles Quarterfinals	(Canada) Gabriela Dabrowski [6] (China) Xu Yifan [6]	(United States) Bethanie Mattek-Sands (Czech Republic) Lucie Šafářová	5–7, 6–4, 6–2
Mixed Doubles 3rd Round	(New Zealand) Michael Venus [9] (Slovenia) Katarina Srebotnik [9]	(Croatia) Nikola Mektić [5] (Chinese Taipei) Chan Hao-ching [5]	4–6, 7–6^{(7–2)}, 6–4
Ladies' Invitation Doubles Round Robin	(Belgium) Kim Clijsters (Australia) Rennae Stubbs	(China) Li Na (Japan) Ai Sugiyama	6–1, 6–4
Ladies' Invitation Doubles Round Robin	(Zimbabwe) Cara Black (United States) Martina Navratilova	(United States) Lindsay Davenport (United States) Mary Joe Fernández	6–3, 6–3

== Day 10 (12 July) ==
- Seeds out:
  - Ladies' Singles: (Latvia) Jeļena Ostapenko [12], (Germany) Julia Görges [13]
  - Gentlemen's Doubles: (United Kingdom) Dominic Inglot [15] / (Croatia) Franko Škugor [15]
  - Mixed Doubles: (Brazil) Bruno Soares / (Russia) Ekaterina Makarova [2], (Croatia) Ivan Dodig / (Chinese Taipei) Latisha Chan [3], (Netherlands) Jean-Julien Rojer / (Netherlands) Demi Schuurs [4], (Colombia) Juan Sebastián Cabal [10] / (United States) Abigail Spears [10]
- Schedule of play

Matches on main courts
Matches on Centre Court
Event	Winner	Loser	Score
Ladies' Singles Semifinals	(Germany) Angelique Kerber [11]	(Latvia) Jeļena Ostapenko [12]	6–3, 6–3
Ladies' Singles Semifinals	(United States) Serena Williams [25/PR]	(Germany) Julia Görges [13]	6–2, 6–4
Mixed Doubles Quarterfinals	(United Kingdom) Jay Clarke [WC] (United Kingdom) Harriet Dart [WC]	(Colombia) Juan Sebastián Cabal [10] (United States) Abigail Spears [10]	7–6^{(12–10)}, 7–5
Gentlemen's Invitational Doubles Round Robin	(Germany) Tommy Haas (Australia) Mark Philippoussis	(Chile) Fernando González (France) Sébastien Grosjean	6–3, 6–4
Matches on No. 1 Court
Event	Winner	Loser	Score
Gentlemen's Doubles Semifinals	(South Africa) Raven Klaasen [13] (New Zealand) Michael Venus [13]	(Denmark) Frederik Nielsen (United Kingdom) Joe Salisbury	7–6^{(8-6)}, 3–6, 6–3, 6–4
Mixed Doubles Quarterfinals	(United Kingdom) Jamie Murray (Belarus) Victoria Azarenka	(Netherlands) Jean-Julien Rojer [4] (Netherlands) Demi Schuurs [4]	4–6, 7–5, 7–5
Mixed Doubles Quarterfinals	(New Zealand) Michael Venus [9] (Slovenia) Katarina Srebotnik [9]	(Croatia) Ivan Dodig [3] (Chinese Taipei) Latisha Chan [3]	7–5, 3–6, 6–0
Matches on No. 2 Court
Event	Winner	Loser	Score
Gentleman's Invitational Doubles Round Robin	(Sweden) Thomas Enqvist (Sweden) Thomas Johansson	(United Kingdom) Jamie Delgado (United Kingdom) Jonathan Marray	7–6^{(7–3)}, 6–3
Gentlemen's Doubles Semifinals	(United States) Mike Bryan [7] (United States) Jack Sock [7]	(United Kingdom) Dominic Inglot [15] (Croatia) Franko Škugor [15]	6–3, 6–1, 6–7^{(11–13)}, 6–7^{(4–7)}, 6–4
Girls' Singles Quarterfinals	(Poland) Iga Świątek [9]	(United Kingdom) Emma Raducanu	6–0, 6–1
Boys' Doubles Second Round	(Colombia) Nicolás Mejía [6] (Czech Republic) Ondřej Štyler [6]	(China) Mu Tao (Germany) Leopold Zima	6–3, 3–6, 8–6
Matches on No. 3 Court
Event	Winner	Loser	Score
Ladies' Invitational Doubles Round Robin	(Croatia) Iva Majoli (Tunisia) Selima Sfar	(United States) Tracy Austin (United Kingdom) Anne Keothavong	5–7, 6–3, [10–7]
Senior Gentlemen's Invitational Doubles Round Robin	(South Africa) Wayne Ferreira (Australia) Mark Woodforde	(United States) Patrick McEnroe (United States) Jeff Tarango	6–2, 6–3
Senior Gentlemen's Invitational Doubles Round Robin	(Netherlands) Jacco Eltingh (Netherlands) Paul Haarhuis	(United Kingdom) Jeremy Bates (United Kingdom) Andrew Castle	6–4, 6–3
Senior Gentlemen's Invitational Doubles Round Robin	(Sweden) Jonas Björkman (Australia) Todd Woodbridge	(Iran) Mansour Bahrami (Croatia) Goran Ivanišević	6–4, 4–6, [10–7]
Gentlemen's Invitational Doubles Round Robin	(United States) Justin Gimelstob (United Kingdom) Ross Hutchins	(France) Arnaud Clément (United Kingdom) Miles Maclagan	6–2, 7–5

== Day 11 (13 July) ==
- Seeds out:
  - Gentlemen's Singles: (United States) John Isner [9]
  - Ladies' Doubles: (Canada) Gabriela Dabrowski / (China) Xu Yifan [6]
  - Mixed Doubles: (New Zealand) Michael Venus / (Slovenia) Katarina Srebotnik [9]
- Schedule of play

Matches on main courts
Matches on Centre Court
Event	Winner	Loser	Score
Gentlemen's Singles Semifinals	(South Africa) Kevin Anderson [8]	(United States) John Isner [9]	7–6^{(8–6)}, 6–7^{(5–7)}, 6–7^{(9–11)}, 6–4, 26–24
Gentlemen's Singles Semifinals	(Serbia) Novak Djokovic [12] vs (Spain) Rafael Nadal [2]		6–4, 3–6, 7–6^{(11–9)}, suspended
Matches on No. 1 Court
Event	Winner	Loser	Score
Ladies' Doubles Semifinals	(United States) Nicole Melichar [12] (Czech Republic) Květa Peschke [12]	(Canada) Gabriela Dabrowski [6] (China) Xu Yifan [6]	6–3, 4–6, 7–5
Ladies' Doubles Semifinals	(Czech Republic) Barbora Krejčíková [3] (Czech Republic) Kateřina Siniaková [3]	(Poland) Alicja Rosolska (United States) Abigail Spears	7–5, 6–4
Mixed Doubles Semifinals	(United Kingdom) Jamie Murray (Belarus) Victoria Azarenka	(United Kingdom) Jay Clarke [WC] (United Kingdom) Harriet Dart [WC]	6–2, 6–2
Mixed Doubles Semifinals	(Austria) Alexander Peya [11] (United States) Nicole Melichar [11]	(New Zealand) Michael Venus [9] (Slovenia) Katarina Srebotnik [9]	6–4, 6–4
Matches on No. 3 Court
Event	Winner	Loser	Score
Senior Gentlemen's Invitation Doubles Round Robin	(United Kingdom) Jeremy Bates (United Kingdom) Andrew Castle	(Iran) Mansour Bahrami (Croatia) Goran Ivanišević	6–4, 7–6^{(7–4)}
Ladies' Invitation Doubles Round Robin	(Spain) Conchita Martínez (Austria) Barbara Schett	(United States) Lindsay Davenport (United States) Mary Joe Fernández	6–4, 4–6, [10–6]
Boys' Singles Semifinals	(United Kingdom) Jack Draper	(Colombia) Nicolás Mejía [5]	7–6^{(7–5)}, 6–7^{(6–8)}, 19–17

== Day 12 (14 July) ==
- Seeds out:
  - Gentlemen's Singles: (Spain) Rafael Nadal [2]
  - Ladies' Singles: (United States) Serena Williams [25]
  - Gentlemen's Doubles: (South Africa) Raven Klaasen / (New Zealand) Michael Venus [13]
  - Ladies' Doubles: (United States) Nicole Melichar / (Czech Republic) Květa Peschke [12]
- Schedule of play

Matches on main courts
Matches on Centre Court
Event	Winner	Loser	Score
Gentlemen's Singles Semifinals	(Serbia) Novak Djokovic [12]	(Spain) Rafael Nadal [2]	6–4, 3–6, 7–6 ^{(11–9)}, 3–6, 10–8
Ladies' Singles Final	(Germany) Angelique Kerber [11]	(United States) Serena Williams [25/PR]	6–3, 6–3
Gentlemen's Doubles Final	(United States) Mike Bryan [7] (United States) Jack Sock [7]	(South Africa) Raven Klaasen [13] (New Zealand) Michael Venus [13]	6–3, 6–7^{(7–9)}, 6–3, 5–7, 7–5
Matches on No. 1 Court
Event	Winner	Loser	Score
Girls' Singles Final	(Poland) Iga Świątek	(Switzerland) Leonie Küng	6–4, 6–2
Senior Gentlemen's Invitation Doubles Round Robin	(France) Henri Leconte (France) Cédric Pioline	(United States) Patrick McEnroe (United States) Jeff Tarango	6–4, 7–5
Gentlemen's Invitation Doubles Round Robin	(Germany) Tommy Haas (Australia) Mark Philippoussis	(Sweden) Thomas Enqvist (Sweden) Thomas Johansson	6–2, 6–7^{(3–7)}, [10–8]
Ladies' Doubles Final	(Czech Republic) Barbora Krejčíková [3] (Czech Republic) Kateřina Siniaková [3]	(United States) Nicole Melichar [12] (Czech Republic) Květa Peschke [12]	6–4, 4–6, 6–0
Matches on No. 3 Court
Event	Winner	Loser	Score
Gentleman's Wheelchair Doubles Final	(United Kingdom) Alfie Hewett [2] (United Kingdom) Gordon Reid [2]	(Belgium) Joachim Gérard (Sweden) Stefan Olsson	6–1, 6–4
Ladies' Wheelchair Singles Final	(Netherlands) Diede de Groot	(Netherlands) Aniek van Koot	6–3, 6–2
Quad Wheelchair Doubles Final	(United Kingdom) Andrew Lapthorne (United States) David Wagner	(Australia) Dylan Alcott (South Africa) Lucas Sithole	6–2, 6–3

== Day 13 (15 July) ==
- Seeds out:
  - Gentlemen's Singles: (South Africa) Kevin Anderson [8]
- Schedule of play

Matches on main courts
Matches on Centre Court
Event	Winner	Loser	Score
Gentlemen's Singles Final	(Serbia) Novak Djokovic [12]	(South Africa) Kevin Anderson [8]	6–2, 6–2, 7–6^{(7–3)}
Mixed Doubles Final	(Austria) Alexander Peya [11] (United States) Nicole Melichar [11]	(United Kingdom) Jamie Murray (Belarus) Victoria Azarenka	7–6^{(7–1)}, 6–3
Matches on No. 1 Court
Event	Winner	Loser	Score
Boys' Singles Final	(Chinese Taipei) Tseng Chun-hsin [1]	(United Kingdom) Jack Draper	6–1, 6–7^{(2–7)}, 6–4
Ladies's Invitation Doubles Final	(Belgium) Kim Clijsters (Australia) Rennae Stubbs	(Zimbabwe) Cara Black (United States) Martina Navratilova	6–3, 6–4
Gentlemen's Invitation Doubles Final	(Germany) Tommy Haas (Australia) Mark Philippoussis	(United Kingdom) Colin Fleming (Belgium) Xavier Malisse	7–6^{(7–4)}, 6–4
Matches on No. 3 Court
Event	Winner	Loser	Score
Ladies' Wheelchair Doubles Final	(Netherlands) Diede de Groot [1] (Japan) Yui Kamiji [1]	(Germany) Sabine Ellerbrock (United Kingdom) Lucy Shuker	6–1, 6–1
Gentlemen's Wheelchair Singles Final	(Sweden) Stefan Olsson	(Argentina) Gustavo Fernández	6–2, 0–6, 6–3
