= Ondřej Štyler =

Czech tennis player (born 2000)

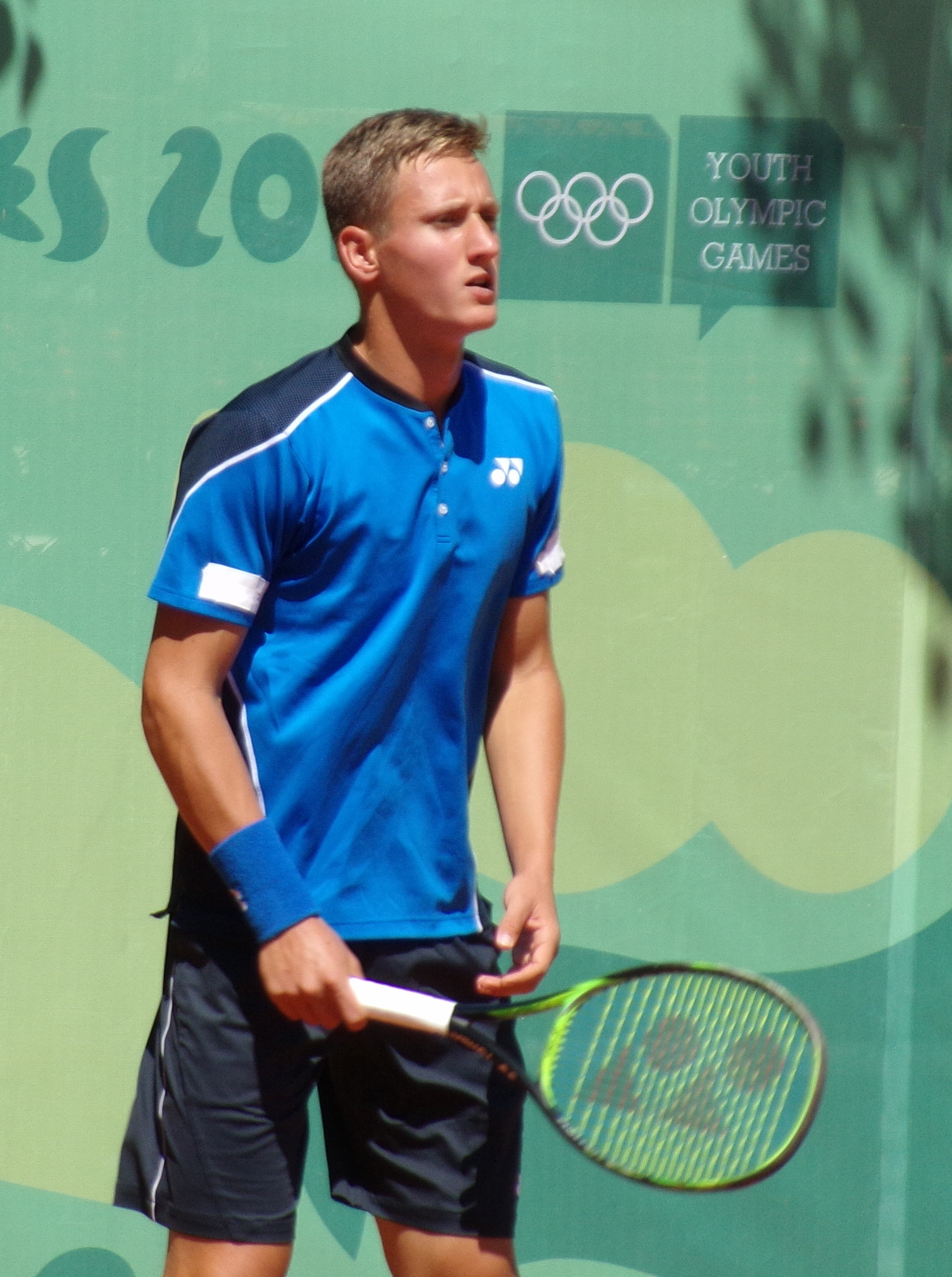
- Štyler at the 2018 Summer Youth Olympics
- Country (sports): Czech Republic
- Born: 1 June 2000 (age 26) Prague, Czech Republic
- Plays: Right-handed (two-handed backhand)
- College: University of Michigan
- Prize money: US $6,048

Singles
- Career record: 0–0 (at ATP Tour level, Grand Slam level, and in Davis Cup)
- Career titles: 0
- Highest ranking: No. 1,117 (17 December 2018)
- Current ranking: -

Grand Slam singles results
- Wimbledon Junior: 3R (2018)
- US Open Junior: 1R (2018)

Doubles
- Career record: 0–0 (at ATP Tour level, Grand Slam level, and in Davis Cup)
- Career titles: 0
- Highest ranking: No. 694 (10 June 2019)
- Current ranking: -

Grand Slam doubles results
- French Open Junior: W (2018)

Ondřej Štyler (born 1 June 2000) is a Czech tennis player. He was the winner of the 2018 French Open boys' doubles and a finalist in the 2018 Wimbledon boys' doubles.

He reached a career-high ITF junior combined ranking of No. 13 on 29 January 2018. He has reached two ITF Futures doubles finals, winning one in Most, Czech Republic with Tadeas Paroulek in June 2019. Styler was also the runner-up in the NCAA Division I men's singles tournament, representing the University of Michigan.

As of January 2024 Styler is unranked in both professional singles and doubles.

== Junior Grand Slam Finals ==
=== Doubles: (1-1) ===
Result	Year	Tournament	Surface	Partner	Opponents	Score
Win	2018	(France) French Open	Clay	(Japan) Naoki Tajima	(Chinese Taipei) Ray Ho (Chinese Taipei) Tseng Chun-hsin	6–4, 6–4
Loss	2018	(United Kingdom) Wimbledon	Grass	(Colombia) Nicolás Mejía	(Finland) Otto Virtanen (Turkey) Yankı Erel	6–7^{(5–7)}, 4–6

== Challenger and Futures finals ==
=== Doubles: 2 (1–1) ===
Legend (doubles) ATP Challenger Tour (0–0) ITF Futures Tour (1–1)	Titles by surface Hard (0–1) Clay (1–0) Grass (0–0) Carpet (0–0)

Result	W–L	Date	Tournament	Tier	Surface	Partner	Opponents	Score
Loss	0–1	Dec 2018	Czech Republic F12, Prague	Futures	Hard (i)	(Czech Republic) Daniel Pátý	(Czech Republic) Marek Gengel (Czech Republic) Michal Konečný	5–7, 2–6
Win	1–1	Jun 2019	M25+H Most, Czech Republic	World Tennis Tour	Clay	(Czech Republic) Tadeas Paroulek	(Czech Republic) Václav Šafránek (Czech Republic) Jan Šátral	7–5, 6–1
