= 2018 Wimbledon Championships – Wheelchair quad doubles =

Wheelchair quad doubles
- 2018 Wimbledon Championships

Final
- Champions: (United Kingdom) Andrew Lapthorne (United States) David Wagner
- Runners-up: (Australia) Dylan Alcott (South Africa) Lucas Sithole
- Score: 6–2, 6–3

Events
Singles	men	women		boys	girls
Doubles	men	women	mixed	boys	girls
WC Singles	men	women	quad
WC Doubles	men	women	quad
Legends	men	women	seniors
- Wimbledon Championships

The 2018 Wimbledon wheelchair tennis Quad Doubles final was an exhibition match that took place on July 14, 2018. Andrew Lapthorne and David Wagner defeated Dylan Alcott and Lucas Sithole, 6–2, 6–3.

On November 27, 2017, the All England Club announced that it would host a Quad Doubles exhibition match, for the first time, in 2018. Up to that time, the Quad division had not played at either Wimbledon or the French Open. Lapthorne and Wagner had long campaigned for the inclusion of the division in Wimbledon. In December 2018, the All England Club announced a Quad Singles draw and a Quad Doubles draw in 2019.

== Seeds ==
1. (United Kingdom) Andrew Lapthorne / (United States) David Wagner (champions)
2. (Australia) Dylan Alcott / (South Africa) Lucas Sithole (final)

== Draw ==
Key

- Q = Qualifier
- WC = Wild card
- LL = Lucky loser
- Alt = Alternate
- ITF = ITF entry
- PR = Protected ranking
- SR = Special ranking
- SE = Special exempt
- JE = Junior exempt
- JR = Junior Accelerator Programme entrant
- CO = College Accelerator Programme entrant
- NG = Next Gen Accelerator Program entrant
- w/o = Walkover
- r = Retired
- d = Defaulted

Final
1	(United Kingdom) Andrew Lapthorne (United States) David Wagner	6	6
2	(Australia) Dylan Alcott (South Africa) Lucas Sithole	2	3

== Sources ==
- Main Draw
