= 2018 Wimbledon Championships – Girls' singles =

Girls' singles
- 2018 Wimbledon Championships

Final
- Champion: (Poland) Iga Świątek
- Runner-up: (Switzerland) Leonie Küng
- Score: 6–4, 6–2

Events
Singles	men	women		boys	girls
Doubles	men	women	mixed	boys	girls
WC Singles	men	women	quad
WC Doubles	men	women	quad
Legends	men	women	seniors
← 2017 ·	Wimbledon Championships	· 2019 →

Iga Świątek defeated Leonie Küng in the final, 6–4, 6–2 to win the girls' singles tennis title at the 2018 Wimbledon Championships. Świątek went on to win the ladies' singles title in 2025.

Claire Liu was the defending champion, but chose not to compete in the junior event. She received a wildcard into the qualifying competition and won three matches to qualify for the main draw before losing to eventual champion Angelique Kerber in the second round; she was the only player in the tournament to win a set against Kerber.

This tournament featured a second-round match between Emma Raducanu and Leylah Fernandez; the pair would later face off in the women's final of the 2021 US Open. Raducanu won this encounter before losing to Świątek in the quarterfinals.

== Seeds ==
1. (United States) Whitney Osuigwe (first round)
2. (Chinese Taipei) Liang En-shuo (second round)
3. (United States) Cori Gauff (quarterfinals)
4. (China) Wang Xinyu (semifinals)
5. (United States) Alexa Noel (second round)
6. (Colombia) Camila Osorio (first round)
7. (Luxembourg) Eléonora Molinaro (second round)
8. (Denmark) Clara Tauson (second round)

9. (Japan) Yuki Naito (third round)
10. (China) Wang Xiyu (semifinals)
11. (Canada) Leylah Annie Fernandez (second round)
12. (Japan) Naho Sato (third round)
13. (United States) Caty McNally (quarterfinals)
14. (Italy) Elisabetta Cocciaretto (third round)
15. (Argentina) María Lourdes Carlé (third round)
16. (France) Clara Burel (third round)

Click on the seed number of a player to go to their draw section.

== Draw ==
=== Key ===
- Q = Qualifier
- WC = Wild card
- LL = Lucky loser
- Alt = Alternate
- ITF = ITF entry
- PR = Protected ranking
- SR = Special ranking
- SE = Special exempt
- JE = Junior exempt
- JR = Junior Accelerator Programme entrant
- CO = College Accelerator Programme entrant
- NG = Next Gen Accelerator Program entrant
- w/o = Walkover
- r = Retired
- d = Defaulted

=== Finals ===
Quarterfinals
(Poland) Iga Świątek	6	6
(United Kingdom) Emma Raducanu	0	1
4	(China) Wang Xinyu	6^{4}	7^{7}	6
(Ukraine) Viktoriia Dema	7^{7}	6^{4}	3
10	(China) Wang Xiyu	4	7^{7}	6
3	(United States) Cori Gauff	6	6^{1}	4
Q	(Switzerland) Leonie Küng	7^{7}	7
13	(United States) Caty McNally	6^{3}	5

Semifinals
(Poland) Iga Świątek	7	7^{7}
4	(China) Wang Xinyu	5	6^{1}
10	(China) Wang Xiyu	4	7^{8}	3
Q	(Switzerland) Leonie Küng	6	6^{6}	6

Final
(Poland) Iga Świątek	6	6
Q	(Switzerland) Leonie Küng	4	2

=== Top half ===
==== Section 1 ====
First round
1	(United States) Whitney Osuigwe	6	3	3
(Poland) Iga Świątek	2	6	6
LL	(Sweden) Caijsa Hennemann	3	6	2
(Switzerland) Simona Waltert	6	3	6
(Burundi) Sada Nahimana	6	6
(Thailand) Thasaporn Naklo	4	1
(Latvia) Daniela Vismane	3	4
16	(France) Clara Burel	6	6
11	(Canada) Leylah Annie Fernandez	6	7^{7}
(Papua New Guinea) Violet Apisah	4	6^{2}
(United Kingdom) Emma Raducanu	6	6
(United States) Gabriella Price	1	4
(Russia) Elina Avanesyan	1	4
(Chinese Taipei) Joanna Garland	6	6
(United States) Natasha Subhash	7	3	4
7	(Luxembourg) Eléonora Molinaro	5	6	6

Second round
(Poland) I Świątek	6	7^{7}
(Switzerland) S Waltert	1	6^{2}
(Burundi) S Nahimana	0	4
16	(France) C Burel	6	6
11	(Canada) LA Fernandez	2	4
(United Kingdom) E Raducanu	6	6
(Chinese Taipei) J Garland	6	6
7	(Luxembourg) E Molinaro	0	0

Third round
(Poland) I Świątek	6	6
16	(France) C Burel	1	2
(United Kingdom) E Raducanu	7	6
(Chinese Taipei) J Garland	5	4

Quarterfinals
(Poland) I Świątek	6	6
(United Kingdom) E Raducanu	0	1

==== Section 2 ====
First round
4	(China) Wang Xinyu	6	6
(Argentina) Ana Geller	4	4
(New Zealand) Lulu Sun	6	6
(Spain) Marta Custic	1	3
(Belarus) Viktoryia Kanapatskaya	2	6	3
(United States) Katie Volynets	6	4	6
WC	(United Kingdom) Francesca Jones	6	5	4
14	(Italy) Elisabetta Cocciaretto	2	7	6
12	(Japan) Naho Sato	6	4	6
(Romania) Andreea Prisăcariu	4	6	3
(Russia) Kamilla Rakhimova	6	6
Q	(Switzerland) Joanne Züger	2	1
(Ukraine) Viktoriia Dema	7^{7}	6
(Georgia (country)) Mariam Dalakishvili	6^{3}	3
(France) Manon Léonard	3	1
5	(United States) Alexa Noel	6	6

Second round
4	(China) Xin Wang	7^{11}	6
(New Zealand) L Sun	6^{9}	3
(United States) K Volynets	5	4
14	(Italy) E Cocciaretto	7	6
12	(Japan) N Sato	6	6
(Russia) K Rakhimova	2	3
(Ukraine) V Dema	6	6
5	(United States) A Noel	3	3

Third round
4	(China) Xin Wang	6	6
14	(Italy) E Cocciaretto	1	3
12	(Japan) N Sato	6	5	4
(Ukraine) V Dema	2	7	6

Quarterfinals
4	(China) Xin Wang	6^{4}	7^{7}	6
(Ukraine) V Dema	7^{7}	6^{4}	3

=== Bottom half ===
==== Section 3 ====
First round
8	(Denmark) Clara Tauson	6	6
Q	(Thailand) Mananchaya Sawangkaew	2	0
WC	(United Kingdom) Victoria Allen	6	4	3
(United States) Lea Ma	3	6	6
Q	(United States) Peyton Stearns	6	7
(Hungary) Adrienn Nagy	4	5
(Republic of Ireland) Georgia Drummy	3	4
10	(China) Wang Xiyu	6	6
15	(Argentina) María Lourdes Carlé	6	7^{7}
(France) Diane Parry	4	6^{2}
(Guatemala) María Gabriela Rivera Corado	3	2
(United States) Dalayna Hewitt	6	6
(Slovakia) Lenka Stará	7	6
(Russia) Sofya Lansere	5	0
(Bulgaria) Gergana Topalova	1	4
3	(United States) Cori Gauff	6	6

Second round
8	(Denmark) C Tauson	6^{2}	6^{4}
(United States) L Ma	7^{7}	7^{7}
Q	(United States) P Stearns	2	1
10	(China) Xiy Wang	6	6
15	(Argentina) ML Carlé	6	6
(United States) D Hewitt	4	3
(Slovakia) L Stará	1	5
3	(United States) C Gauff	6	7

Third round
(United States) L Ma	2	4
10	(China) Xiy Wang	6	6
15	(Argentina) ML Carlé	7	4	2
3	(United States) C Gauff	5	6	6

Quarterfinals
10	(China) Xiy Wang	4	7^{7}	6
3	(United States) C Gauff	6	6^{1}	4

==== Section 4 ====
First round
6	(Colombia) Camila Osorio	4	4
Q	(Switzerland) Leonie Küng	6	6
(Slovenia) Nika Radišič	3	2
(Georgia (country)) Ana Makatsaria	6	6
(France) Yasmine Mansouri	7^{10}	3	9
Q	(Ukraine) Daria Snigur	6^{8}	6	7
(United States) Hurricane Tyra Black	6	4	2
9	(Japan) Yuki Naito	4	6	6
13	(United States) Caty McNally	5	6	6
Q	(Russia) Daria Frayman	7	0	1
WC	(United Kingdom) Destinee Martins	7	6
(Poland) Stefania Rogozińska Dzik	5	1
Q	(Italy) Federica Rossi	4	4
(China) Zheng Qinwen	6	6
Q	(Japan) Anri Nagata	2	6	2
2	(Chinese Taipei) Liang En-shuo	6	3	6

Second round
Q	(Switzerland) L Küng	6	6
(Georgia (country)) A Makatsaria	1	1
(France) Y Mansouri	3	1
9	(Japan) Y Naito	6	6
13	(United States) C McNally	6	6
WC	(United Kingdom) D Martins	0	4
(China) Q Zheng	6	3	6
2	(Chinese Taipei) E-s Liang	4	6	3

Third round
Q	(Switzerland) L Küng	6	6
9	(Japan) Y Naito	3	3
13	(United States) C McNally	1	7^{7}	6
(China) Q Zheng	6	6^{4}	1

Quarterfinals
Q	(Switzerland) L Küng	7^{7}	7
13	(United States) C McNally	6^{3}	5

== Qualifying ==
=== Seeds ===
1. (France) Loudmilla Bencheikh (qualifying competition)
2. (United States) Peyton Stearns (qualified)
3. (Ukraine) Daria Snigur (qualified)
4. (Malta) Francesca Curmi (first round)
5. (Hong Kong) Cody Wong Hong-yi (first round)
6. (Thailand) Mananchaya Sawangkaew (qualified)
7. (Morocco) Diae El Jardi (first round)
8. (Turkey) Selin Övünç (qualifying competition)
9. (Italy) Federica Sacco (first round)
10. (United States) Chloe Beck (first round)
11. (Russia) Daria Frayman (qualified)
12. (Bulgaria) Daniella Dimitrova (qualifying competition)
13. (Poland) Ania Hertel (first round)
14. (Spain) Paula Arias Manjón (qualifying competition)
15. (Sweden) Caijsa Hennemann (qualifying competition; lucky loser)
16. (Russia) Evgeniya Burdina (first round)

=== Qualifiers ===
1. (Italy) Federica Rossi
2. (United States) Peyton Stearns
3. (Ukraine) Daria Snigur
4. (Switzerland) Leonie Küng
5. (Japan) Anri Nagata
6. (Thailand) Mananchaya Sawangkaew
7. (Switzerland) Joanne Züger
8. (Russia) Daria Frayman

=== Lucky loser ===
1. (Sweden) Caijsa Hennemann

=== Draw ===
==== First qualifier ====
First round
1	(France) Loudmilla Bencheikh	4	6	7
(United Kingdom) Erin Richardson	6	3	5
(Italy) Federica Rossi	6	6
13	(Poland) Ania Hertel	1	3

Qualifying competition
1	(France) Loudmilla Bencheikh	4	3
(Italy) Federica Rossi	6	6

==== Second qualifier ====
First round
2	(United States) Peyton Stearns	7	6
WC	(United Kingdom) Amelia Bissett	5	3
(Austria) Sinja Kraus	5	6	4
14	(Spain) Paula Arias Manjón	7	3	6

Qualifying competition
2	(United States) Peyton Stearns	7^{7}	6
14	(Spain) Paula Arias Manjón	6^{5}	2

==== Third qualifier ====
First round
3	(Ukraine) Daria Snigur	6	6
WC	(United Kingdom) Maria Budin	1	1
(Slovakia) Romana Čisovská	6^{3}	6	6
16	(Russia) Evgeniya Burdina	7^{7}	4	1

Qualifying competition
3	(Ukraine) Daria Snigur	6	6
(Slovakia) Romana Čisovská	4	2

==== Fourth qualifier ====
First round
4	(Malta) Francesca Curmi	2	4
(Switzerland) Leonie Küng	6	6
WC	(United Kingdom) Morgan Cross	0	1
12	(Bulgaria) Daniella Dimitrova	6	6

Qualifying competition
(Switzerland) Leonie Küng	6	6
12	(Bulgaria) Daniella Dimitrova	2	4

==== Fifth qualifier ====
First round
5	(Hong Kong) Cody Wong Hong-yi	4	6	4
(Japan) Anri Nagata	6	4	6
(Poland) Weronika Falkowska	3	4
15	(Sweden) Caijsa Hennemann	6	6

Qualifying competition
(Japan) Anri Nagata	6	6
15	(Sweden) Caijsa Hennemann	1	2

==== Sixth qualifier ====
First round
6	(Thailand) Mananchaya Sawangkaew	7	6
WC	(United Kingdom) Sonay Kartal	5	1
(Belgium) Victoria Kalaitzis	6	6
9	(Italy) Federica Sacco	4	4

Qualifying competition
6	(Thailand) Mananchaya Sawangkaew	6	4	6
(Belgium) Victoria Kalaitzis	4	6	2

==== Seventh qualifier ====
First round
7	(Morocco) Diae El Jardi	0	2
WC	(United Kingdom) Sasha Hill	6	6
(Switzerland) Joanne Züger	6	6
10	(United States) Chloe Beck	2	4

Qualifying competition
WC	(United Kingdom) Sasha Hill	0	3
(Switzerland) Joanne Züger	6	6

==== Eighth qualifier ====
First round
8	(Turkey) Selin Övünç	6	3	6
(Denmark) Hannah Viller Møller	1	6	2
WC	(United Kingdom) Danielle Daley	3	1
11	(Russia) Daria Frayman	6	6

Qualifying competition
8	(Turkey) Selin Övünç	0	1
11	(Russia) Daria Frayman	6	6
