= 2018 Wimbledon Championships – Wheelchair women's singles =

Wheelchair women's singles
- 2018 Wimbledon Championships

Final
- Champion: (Netherlands) Diede de Groot
- Runner-up: (Netherlands) Aniek van Koot
- Score: 6–3, 6–2

Events
Singles	men	women		boys	girls
Doubles	men	women	mixed	boys	girls
WC Singles	men	women	quad
WC Doubles	men	women	quad
Legends	men	women	seniors
← 2017 ·	Wimbledon Championships	· 2019 →

Defending champion Diede de Groot defeated Aniek van Koot in the final, 6–3, 6–2 to win the ladies' singles wheelchair tennis title at the 2018 Wimbledon Championships. It was her first step towards a non-calendar-year Grand Slam.

== Seeds ==
1. (Netherlands) Diede de Groot (champion)
2. (Japan) Yui Kamiji (semifinals)

== Draw ==
=== Key ===
- Q = Qualifier
- WC = Wild card
- LL = Lucky loser
- Alt = Alternate
- ITF = ITF entry
- PR = Protected ranking
- SR = Special ranking
- SE = Special exempt
- JE = Junior exempt
- JR = Junior Accelerator Programme entrant
- CO = College Accelerator Programme entrant
- NG = Next Gen Accelerator Program entrant
- w/o = Walkover
- r = Retired
- d = Defaulted

=== Finals ===
Quarterfinals
1	(Netherlands) Diede de Groot	6	6
(Germany) Sabine Ellerbrock	4	3
(Germany) Katharina Krüger	3	6	1
WC	(South Africa) Kgothatso Montjane	6	2	6
(United Kingdom) Lucy Shuker	2	1
(Netherlands) Aniek van Koot	6	6
(Netherlands) Marjolein Buis	4	4
2	(Japan) Yui Kamiji	6	6

Semifinals
1	(Netherlands) Diede de Groot	6	7
WC	(South Africa) Kgothatso Montjane	1	5
(Netherlands) Aniek van Koot	1	6	7^{13}
2	(Japan) Yui Kamiji	6	4	6^{11}

Final
1	(Netherlands) Diede de Groot	6	6
(Netherlands) Aniek van Koot	3	2
