= 2018 Wimbledon Championships – Girls' doubles =

Girls' doubles
- 2018 Wimbledon Championships

Final
- Champions: (China) Wang Xinyu (China) Wang Xiyu
- Runners-up: (United States) Caty McNally (United States) Whitney Osuigwe
- Score: 6–2, 6–1

Events
| Singles | men | women | | boys | girls |
| Doubles | men | women | mixed | boys | girls |
| WC Singles | men | women | quad |
| WC Doubles | men | women | quad |
| Legends | men | women | seniors |
| ← 2017 · | Wimbledon Championships | · 2019 → |

Wang Xinyu and Wang Xiyu won the title, defeating Caty McNally and Whitney Osuigwe in the final, 6–2, 6–1.

Olga Danilović and Kaja Juvan were the defending champions, but chose not to participate.

== Seeds ==
1. (China) Wang Xinyu / (China) Wang Xiyu (champions)
2. (United States) Caty McNally / (United States) Whitney Osuigwe (final)
3. (Luxembourg) Eléonora Molinaro / (Denmark) Clara Tauson (first round)
4. (Argentina) María Lourdes Carlé / (United States) Cori Gauff (semifinals)
5. (Chinese Taipei) Joanna Garland / (Chinese Taipei) Liang En-shuo (quarterfinals)
6. (Japan) Yuki Naito / (Japan) Naho Sato (second round)
7. (Republic of Ireland) Georgia Drummy / (United States) Alexa Noel (quarterfinals)
8. (France) Clara Burel / (France) Diane Parry (quarterfinals)

== Draw ==
=== Key ===
- Q = Qualifier
- WC = Wild card
- LL = Lucky loser
- Alt = Alternate
- SE = Special exempt
- PR = Protected ranking
- ITF = ITF entry
- JE = Junior exempt
- w/o = Walkover
- r = Retired
- d = Defaulted
- SR = Special ranking

=== Finals ===
Semifinals
1 | (China) Wang Xinyu (China) Wang Xiyu | 6 | 6
4 | (Argentina) María Lourdes Carlé (United States) Cori Gauff | 4 | 2
(United States) Dalayna Hewitt (United States) Peyton Stearns | 2 | 5
2 | (United States) Caty McNally (United States) Whitney Osuigwe | 6 | 7

Final
1 | (China) Wang Xinyu (China) Wang Xiyu | 6 | 6
2 | (United States) Caty McNally (United States) Whitney Osuigwe | 2 | 1

=== Top half ===
First round
1 | (China) Wang Xinyu (China) Wang Xiyu | 6 | 6
(United States) Natasha Subhash (United States) Katie Volynets | 2 | 2
(Switzerland) Leonie Küng (Switzerland) Joanne Züger | 6 | 6
(Georgia (country)) Ana Makatsaria (United States) Lea Ma | 4 | 4
WC | (United Kingdom) Sonay Kartal (United Kingdom) Erin Richardson | 7 | 5 | 6
(France) Loudmilla Bencheikh (France) Manon Léonard | 5 | 7 | 4
(Georgia (country)) Mariam Dalakishvili (Burundi) Sada Nahimana | 2 | 4
5 | (Chinese Taipei) Joanna Garland (Chinese Taipei) Liang En-shuo | 6 | 6
4 | (Argentina) María Lourdes Carlé (United States) Cori Gauff | 6 | 6
(Colombia) Camila Osorio (Guatemala) María Gabriela Rivera Corado | 3 | 1
(United States) Hurricane Tyra Black (Argentina) Ana Geller | 4 | 2
(Russia) Sofya Lansere (Russia) Kamilla Rakhimova | 6 | 6
WC | (United Kingdom) Victoria Allen (United Kingdom) Destinee Martins | 6 | 7
(Papua New Guinea) Violet Apisah (New Zealand) Lulu Sun | 1 | 5
(Russia) Elina Avanesyan (Sweden) Caijsa Hennemann | 0 | 6^{5}
6 | (Japan) Yuki Naito (Japan) Naho Sato | 6 | 7^{7}

Second round
1 | (China) Xin Wang (China) Xiy Wang | 6 | 6
(Switzerland) L Küng (Switzerland) J Züger | 2 | 0
WC | (United Kingdom) S Kartal (United Kingdom) E Richardson | 5 | 5
5 | (Chinese Taipei) J Garland (Chinese Taipei) E-s Liang | 7 | 7
4 | (Argentina) ML Carlé (United States) C Gauff | 7^{7} | 6
(Russia) S Lansere (Russia) K Rakhimova | 6^{4} | 1
WC | (United Kingdom) V Allen (United Kingdom) D Martins | 4 | 6 | 6
6 | (Japan) Y Naito (Japan) N Sato | 6 | 4 | 2

Quarterfinals
1 | (China) Xin Wang (China) Xiy Wang | 6 | 6
5 | (Chinese Taipei) J Garland (Chinese Taipei) E-s Liang | 4 | 2
4 | (Argentina) ML Carlé (United States) C Gauff | 7 | 6
WC | (United Kingdom) V Allen (United Kingdom) D Martins | 5 | 3

Semifinals
1 | (China) Xin Wang (China) Xiy Wang | 6 | 6
4 | (Argentina) ML Carlé (United States) C Gauff | 4 | 2

=== Bottom half ===
First round
8 | (France) Clara Burel (France) Diane Parry | 6 | 6
(Spain) Marta Custic (China) Zheng Qinwen | 4 | 4
WC | (United Kingdom) Danielle Daley (United Kingdom) Tanysha Dissanayake | 2 | 2
(Canada) Leylah Annie Fernandez (United States) Gabriella Price | 6 | 6
(Russia) Daria Frayman (Italy) Federica Rossi | 6^{9} | 0
(United States) Dalayna Hewitt (United States) Peyton Stearns | 7^{11} | 6
(Thailand) Thasaporn Naklo (Thailand) Mananchaya Sawangkaew | 2 | 7^{7} | 6
3 | (Luxembourg) Eléonora Molinaro (Denmark) Clara Tauson | 6 | 6^{4} | 3
7 | (Republic of Ireland) Georgia Drummy (United States) Alexa Noel | 6 | 6
(Belarus) Viktoryia Kanapatskaya (Slovakia) Lenka Stará | 3 | 2
(Italy) Elisabetta Cocciaretto (Slovenia) Nika Radišič | 3 | 6^{5}
WC | (United Kingdom) Amelia Bissett (United Kingdom) Morgan Cross | 6 | 7^{7}
(Hungary) Adrienn Nagy (Poland) Stefania Rogozińska Dzik | 5 | 2
(Malta) Francesca Curmi (Ukraine) Viktoriia Dema | 7 | 6
(Bulgaria) Gergana Topalova (Latvia) Daniela Vismane | 1 | 2
2 | (United States) Caty McNally (United States) Whitney Osuigwe | 6 | 6

Second round
8 | (France) C Burel (France) D Parry | 6 | 6
(Canada) LA Fernandez (United States) G Price | 4 | 4
(United States) D Hewitt (United States) P Stearns | 7 | 7^{7}
(Thailand) T Naklo (Thailand) M Sawangkaew | 5 | 6^{4}
7 | (Republic of Ireland) G Drummy (United States) A Noel | 6 | 6
WC | (United Kingdom) A Bissett (United Kingdom) M Cross | 2 | 3
(Malta) F Curmi (Ukraine) V Dema | 4 | 1
2 | (United States) C McNally (United States) W Osuigwe | 6 | 6

Quarterfinals
8 | (France) C Burel (France) D Parry | 3 | 5
(United States) D Hewitt (United States) P Stearns | 6 | 7
7 | (Republic of Ireland) G Drummy (United States) A Noel | 5 | 5
2 | (United States) C McNally (United States) W Osuigwe | 7 | 7

Semifinals
(United States) D Hewitt (United States) P Stearns | 2 | 5
2 | (United States) C McNally (United States) W Osuigwe | 6 | 7
