= 2018 Wimbledon Championships – Ladies' invitation doubles =

Ladies' invitation doubles
- 2018 Wimbledon Championships

Final
- Champions: (Belgium) Kim Clijsters (Australia) Rennae Stubbs
- Runners-up: (Zimbabwe) Cara Black (United States) Martina Navratilova
- Score: 6–3, 6–4

Events
Singles	men	women		boys	girls
Doubles	men	women	mixed	boys	girls
WC Singles	men	women	quad
WC Doubles	men	women	quad
Legends	men	women	seniors
← 2017 ·	Wimbledon Championships	· 2019 →

Kim Clijsters and Rennae Stubbs won the title, defeating defending champions Cara Black and Martina Navratilova in the final, 6–3, 6–4.

== Draw ==
=== Key ===
- Q = Qualifier
- WC = Wild card
- LL = Lucky loser
- Alt = Alternate
- ITF = ITF entry
- PR = Protected ranking
- SR = Special ranking
- SE = Special exempt
- JE = Junior exempt
- JR = Junior Accelerator Programme entrant
- CO = College Accelerator Programme entrant
- NG = Next Gen Accelerator Program entrant
- w/o = Walkover
- r = Retired
- d = Defaulted

=== Final ===
Final
A2	(Zimbabwe) Cara Black (United States) Martina Navratilova	3	4
B2	(Belgium) Kim Clijsters (Australia) Rennae Stubbs	6	6

=== Group A ===
		(France) Bartoli (Slovakia) Hantuchová	(Zimbabwe) Black (United States) Navratilova	(United States) Davenport (United States) Fernández	(Spain) Martínez (Austria) Schett	RR; W–L	Set; W–L	Game; W–L	Standings
A1	(France) Marion Bartoli (Slovakia) Daniela Hantuchová		1–6, 3–6	6–4, 6–3	7–5, 3–6, [10–8]	2–1	4–3	27–30	2
A2	(Zimbabwe) Cara Black (United States) Martina Navratilova	6–1, 6–3		6–3, 6–3	6–4, 6–3	3–0	6–0	36–17	1
A3	(United States) Lindsay Davenport (United States) Mary Joe Fernández	4–6, 3–6	3–6, 3–6		4–6, 6–4, [6–10]	0–3	1–6	23–35	4
A4	(Spain) Conchita Martínez (Austria) Barbara Schett	5–7, 6–3, [8–10]	4–6, 3–6	6–4, 4–6, [10–6]		1–2	3–5	29–33	3

=== Group B ===
		(United States) Austin (United Kingdom) Keothavong	(Belgium) Clijsters (Australia) Stubbs	(China) Li (Japan) Sugiyama	(Croatia) Majoli (Tunisia) Sfar	RR; W–L	Set; W–L	Game; W–L	Standings
B1	(United States) Tracy Austin (United Kingdom) Anne Keothavong		3–6, 3–6	1–6, 4–6	7–5, 3–6, [7–10]	0–3	1–6	21–36	4
B2	(Belgium) Kim Clijsters (Australia) Rennae Stubbs	6–3, 6–3		6–1, 6–4	6–2, 6–2	3–0	6–0	36–15	1
B3	(China) Li Na (Japan) Ai Sugiyama	6–1, 6–4	1–6, 4–6		6–4, 4–6, [10–8]	2–1	4–3	28–27	2
B4	(Croatia) Iva Majoli (Tunisia) Selima Sfar	5–7, 6–3, [10–7]	2–6, 2–6	4–6, 6–4, [8–10]		1–2	3–5	26–33	3
