= 2018 Wimbledon Championships – Mixed doubles =

Tennis Championship

Mixed doubles
- 2018 Wimbledon Championships

Final
- Champions: (Austria) Alexander Peya (United States) Nicole Melichar
- Runners-up: (United Kingdom) Jamie Murray (Belarus) Victoria Azarenka
- Score: 7–6^{(7–1)}, 6–3

Details
- Draw: 48
- Seeds: 16

Events
Singles	men	women		boys	girls
Doubles	men	women	mixed	boys	girls
WC Singles	men	women	quad
WC Doubles	men	women	quad
Legends	men	women	seniors
- Wimbledon Championships

Jamie Murray and Martina Hingis were the defending champions, but Hingis retired from professional tennis at the end of 2017. Alexander Peya and Nicole Melichar won the title, defeating Murray and Victoria Azarenka in the final, 7–6^{(7–1)}, 6–3.

== Seeds ==
1. (Croatia) Mate Pavić / (Canada) Gabriela Dabrowski (third round)
2. (Brazil) Bruno Soares / (Russia) Ekaterina Makarova (quarterfinals, withdrew)
3. (Croatia) Ivan Dodig / (Chinese Taipei) Latisha Chan (quarterfinals)
4. (Netherlands) Jean-Julien Rojer / (Netherlands) Demi Schuurs (quarterfinals)
5. (Croatia) Nikola Mektić / (Chinese Taipei) Chan Hao-ching (third round)
6. (France) Édouard Roger-Vasselin / (Czech Republic) Andrea Sestini Hlaváčková (third round)
7. (Colombia) Robert Farah / (Germany) Anna-Lena Grönefeld (second round)
8. (United States) Rajeev Ram / (Slovenia) Andreja Klepač (second round)

9. (New Zealand) Michael Venus / (Slovenia) Katarina Srebotnik (semifinals)
10. (Colombia) Juan Sebastián Cabal / (United States) Abigail Spears (quarterfinals)
11. (Austria) Alexander Peya / (United States) Nicole Melichar (champions)
12. (Netherlands) Matwé Middelkoop / (Sweden) Johanna Larsson (third round)
13. (Belarus) Max Mirnyi / (Czech Republic) Květa Peschke (second round)
14. (Japan) Ben McLachlan / (Japan) Eri Hozumi (third round)
15. (Brazil) Marcelo Demoliner / (Spain) María José Martínez Sánchez (second round)
16. (Finland) Henri Kontinen / (United Kingdom) Heather Watson (third round)

Click on the seed number of a player to go to their draw section.

== Draw ==
Key

- Q = Qualifier
- WC = Wild card
- LL = Lucky loser
- Alt = Alternate
- ITF = ITF entry
- PR = Protected ranking
- SR = Special ranking
- SE = Special exempt
- JE = Junior exempt
- JR = Junior Accelerator Programme entrant
- CO = College Accelerator Programme entrant
- NG = Next Gen Accelerator Program entrant
- w/o = Walkover
- r = Retired
- d = Defaulted

=== Finals ===
Quarterfinals
WC	(United Kingdom) Jay Clarke (United Kingdom) Harriet Dart	7^{12}	7
10	(Colombia) Juan Sebastián Cabal (United States) Abigail Spears	6^{10}	5
4	(Netherlands) Jean-Julien Rojer (Netherlands) Demi Schuurs	6	5	5
(United Kingdom) Jamie Murray (Belarus) Victoria Azarenka	4	7	7
9	(New Zealand) Michael Venus (Slovenia) Katarina Srebotnik	7	3	6
3	(Croatia) Ivan Dodig (Chinese Taipei) Latisha Chan	5	6	0
11	(Austria) Alexander Peya (United States) Nicole Melichar	w/o
2	(Brazil) Bruno Soares (Russia) Ekaterina Makarova

Semifinals
WC	(United Kingdom) Jay Clarke (United Kingdom) Harriet Dart	2	2
(United Kingdom) Jamie Murray (Belarus) Victoria Azarenka	6	6
9	(New Zealand) Michael Venus (Slovenia) Katarina Srebotnik	4	4
11	(Austria) Alexander Peya (United States) Nicole Melichar	6	6

Final
(United Kingdom) Jamie Murray (Belarus) Victoria Azarenka	6^{1}	3
11	(Austria) Alexander Peya (United States) Nicole Melichar	7^{7}	6

=== Top half ===
==== Section 1 ====
First round
Alt	(Argentina) L Mayer (Argentina) M Irigoyen	4	5
(New Zealand) A Sitak (Ukraine) L Kichenok	6	7
(Sweden) R Lindstedt (China) Z Yang	6	1	4
WC	(United Kingdom) J Clarke (United Kingdom) H Dart	4	6	6
(France) H Nys (Japan) S Aoyama	5	7^{7}	6
(New Zealand) M Daniell (Ukraine) N Kichenok	7	6^{4}	8
(Netherlands) R Haase (Belgium) K Flipkens	6	7^{7}
(Croatia) F Škugor (United States) V King	4	6^{3}

Second round
1	(Croatia) M Pavić (Canada) G Dabrowski	w/o
(New Zealand) A Sitak (Ukraine) L Kichenok
WC	(United Kingdom) J Clarke (United Kingdom) H Dart	6	4	6
13	(Belarus) M Mirnyi (Czech Republic) K Peschke	2	6	4
10	(Colombia) JS Cabal (United States) A Spears	7^{7}	6
(New Zealand) M Daniell (Ukraine) N Kichenok	6^{1}	3
(Netherlands) R Haase (Belgium) K Flipkens	7^{7}	6
8	(United States) R Ram (Slovenia) A Klepač	6^{1}	2

Third round
1	(Croatia) M Pavić (Canada) G Dabrowski	3	4
WC	(United Kingdom) J Clarke (United Kingdom) H Dart	6	6
10	(Colombia) JS Cabal (United States) A Spears	6	6
(Netherlands) R Haase (Belgium) K Flipkens	3	4

Quarterfinals
WC	(United Kingdom) J Clarke (United Kingdom) H Dart	7^{12}	7
10	(Colombia) JS Cabal (United States) A Spears	6^{10}	5

==== Section 2 ====
First round
(United States) J Cerretani (Czech Republic) R Voráčová	7^{7}	6^{4}	6
(Australia) J-P Smith (Australia) D Gavrilova	6^{5}	7^{7}	2
(United States) M Bryan (United States) B Mattek-Sands	6	6
(Austria) P Oswald (Switzerland) X Knoll	4	4
(United Kingdom) N Skupski (United Kingdom) N Broady	7	7
WC	(United Kingdom) J Salisbury (United Kingdom) K Dunne	5	5
Alt	(Czech Republic) R Jebavý (Czech Republic) L Hradecká	7^{7}	4	4
(United Kingdom) J Murray (Belarus) V Azarenka	6^{2}	6	6

Second round
4	(Netherlands) J-J Rojer (Netherlands) D Schuurs	7^{15}	6
(United States) J Cerretani (Czech Republic) R Voráčová	6^{13}	3
(United States) M Bryan (United States) B Mattek-Sands
14	(Japan) B McLachlan (Japan) E Hozumi	w/o
12	(Netherlands) M Middelkoop (Sweden) J Larsson	6	7^{7}
(United Kingdom) N Skupski (United Kingdom) N Broady	4	6^{0}
(United Kingdom) J Murray (Belarus) V Azarenka	7^{8}	6^{6}	7
7	(Colombia) R Farah (Germany) A-L Grönefeld	6^{6}	7^{8}	5

Third round
4	(Netherlands) J-J Rojer (Netherlands) D Schuurs	6	6
14	(Japan) B McLachlan (Japan) E Hozumi	4	1
12	(Netherlands) M Middelkoop (Sweden) J Larsson	6^{6}	3
(United Kingdom) J Murray (Belarus) V Azarenka	7^{8}	6

Quarterfinals
4	(Netherlands) J-J Rojer (Netherlands) D Schuurs	6	5	5
(United Kingdom) J Murray (Belarus) V Azarenka	4	7	7

=== Bottom half ===
==== Section 3 ====
First round
(France) F Martin (Romania) R Olaru	6^{10}	7^{7}	9
WC	(Australia) T Kokkinakis (Australia) A Barty	7^{12}	6^{2}	7
(Belarus) A Vasilevski (Australia) An Rodionova	7^{7}	7^{9}
WC	(United Kingdom) L Bambridge (United Kingdom) K Boulter	6^{4}	6^{7}
(Poland) M Matkowski (Romania) M Buzărnescu	6	7
(India) D Sharan (Poland) A Rosolska	3	5
(Pakistan) A-u-H Qureshi (Spain) A Parra Santonja	6	6
(Argentina) A Molteni (Japan) M Ninomiya	3	2

Second round
5	(Croatia) N Mektić (Chinese Taipei) H-c Chan	6	6
(France) F Martin (Romania) R Olaru	2	4
(Belarus) A Vasilevski (Australia) An Rodionova	3	7^{8}	2
9	(New Zealand) M Venus (Slovenia) K Srebotnik	6	6^{6}	6
16	(Finland) H Kontinen (United Kingdom) H Watson	6	5	7
(Poland) M Matkowski (Romania) M Buzărnescu	2	7	5
(Pakistan) A-u-H Qureshi (Spain) A Parra Santonja	4	4
3	(Croatia) I Dodig (Chinese Taipei) L Chan	6	6

Third round
5	(Croatia) N Mektić (Chinese Taipei) H-c Chan	6	6^{2}	4
9	(New Zealand) M Venus (Slovenia) K Srebotnik	4	7^{7}	6
16	(Finland) H Kontinen (United Kingdom) H Watson	2	6^{4}
3	(Croatia) I Dodig (Chinese Taipei) L Chan	6	7^{7}

Quarterfinals
9	(New Zealand) M Venus (Slovenia) K Srebotnik	7	3	6
3	(Croatia) I Dodig (Chinese Taipei) L Chan	5	6	0

==== Section 4 ====
First round
(Mexico) S González (United States) R Atawo	6^{4}	6^{3}
(France) N Mahut (Ukraine) E Svitolina	7^{7}	7^{7}
(United States) N Monroe (Georgia (country)) O Kalashnikova	1	7^{7}	5
(United Kingdom) K Skupski (United Kingdom) A Smith	6	6^{3}	7
(United States) J Sock (United States) S Stephens	6	6
WC	(United Kingdom) D Inglot (Australia) S Stosur	2	3
(Australia) J Peers (China) S Zhang	6	6
(Chile) H Podlipnik Castillo (Belarus) L Marozava	4	3

Second round
6	(France) É Roger-Vasselin (Czech Republic) A Sestini Hlaváčková	6	6
(France) N Mahut (Ukraine) E Svitolina	3	3
(United Kingdom) K Skupski (United Kingdom) A Smith	4	6^{2}
11	(Austria) A Peya (United States) N Melichar	6	7^{7}
15	(Brazil) M Demoliner (Spain) MJ Martínez Sánchez	5	2
(United States) J Sock (United States) S Stephens	7	6
(Australia) J Peers (China) S Zhang	6^{4}	3
2	(Brazil) B Soares (Russia) E Makarova	7^{7}	6

Third round
6	(France) É Roger-Vasselin (Czech Republic) A Sestini Hlaváčková	6^{5}	6	7
11	(Austria) A Peya (United States) N Melichar	7^{7}	4	9
(United States) J Sock (United States) S Stephens	1	5
2	(Brazil) B Soares (Russia) E Makarova	6	7

Quarterfinals
11	(Austria) A Peya (United States) N Melichar	w/o
2	(Brazil) B Soares (Russia) E Makarova
