= 2018 Wimbledon Championships – Boys' singles =

2018 Wimbledon Championships - tennis

Boys' singles
- 2018 Wimbledon Championships

Final
- Champion: (Chinese Taipei) Tseng Chun-hsin
- Runner-up: (United Kingdom) Jack Draper
- Score: 6–1, 6–7^{(2–7)}, 6–4

Events
Singles	men	women		boys	girls
Doubles	men	women	mixed	boys	girls
WC Singles	men	women	quad
WC Doubles	men	women	quad
Legends	men	women	seniors
← 2017 ·	Wimbledon Championships	· 2019 →

Tseng Chun-hsin won the title, defeating Jack Draper in the final, 6–1, 6–7^{(2–7)}, 6–4.

Alejandro Davidovich Fokina was the defending champion, but was no longer eligible to participate in junior events. He received a wildcard into the men's singles qualifying competition, where he lost to Peter Polansky in the second round.

== Seeds ==
1. (Chinese Taipei) Tseng Chun-hsin (champion)
2. (Argentina) Sebastián Báez (first round)
3. (United States) Sebastian Korda (first round)
4. (France) Hugo Gaston (third round)
5. (Colombia) Nicolás Mejía (semifinals)
6. (Kazakhstan) Timofei Skatov (third round)
7. (Bulgaria) Adrian Andreev (second round)
8. (Japan) Naoki Tajima (first round)

9. (Argentina) Facundo Díaz Acosta (first round)
10. (Czech Republic) Dalibor Svrčina (second round)
11. (United States) Tristan Boyer (third round)
12. (Spain) Carlos López Montagud (first round)
13. (Romania) Filip Cristian Jianu (first round)
14. (Argentina) Juan Manuel Cerúndolo (second round)
15. (United States) Drew Baird (second round)
16. (United Kingdom) Aidan McHugh (first round)

Click on the seed number of a player to go to their draw section.

== Draw ==
Key

- Q = Qualifier
- WC = Wild card
- LL = Lucky loser
- Alt = Alternate
- ITF = ITF entry
- PR = Protected ranking
- SR = Special ranking
- SE = Special exempt
- JE = Junior exempt
- JR = Junior Accelerator Programme entrant
- CO = College Accelerator Programme entrant
- NG = Next Gen Accelerator Program entrant
- w/o = Walkover
- r = Retired
- d = Defaulted

=== Finals ===
Quarterfinals
1	(Chinese Taipei) Tseng Chun-hsin	6	6
(United States) Trey Hilderbrand	2	4
WC	(United Kingdom) Anton Matusevich	5	1
(China) Mu Tao	7	6
(United Kingdom) Jack Draper	6^{3}	6	6
(Italy) Lorenzo Musetti	7^{7}	3	1
5	(Colombia) Nicolás Mejía	7^{8}	7
(Brazil) Gilbert Soares Klier Júnior	6^{6}	5

Semifinals
1	(Chinese Taipei) Tseng Chun-hsin	6	6
(China) Mu Tao	3	1
(United Kingdom) Jack Draper	7^{7}	6^{6}	19
5	(Colombia) Nicolás Mejía	6^{5}	7^{8}	17

Final
1	(Chinese Taipei) Tseng Chun-hsin	6	6^{2}	6
(United Kingdom) Jack Draper	1	7^{7}	4

=== Top half ===
==== Section 1 ====
First round
1	(Chinese Taipei) Tseng Chun-hsin	6	6
(Poland) Wojciech Marek	2	4
(France) Arthur Cazaux	6	6
(Turkey) Yankı Erel	4	4
WC	(United Kingdom) Emile Hudd	3	7^{7}	4
Q	(Czech Republic) Ondřej Štyler	6	6^{4}	6
Q	(Bulgaria) Simon Anthony Ivanov	4	6	4
15	(United States) Drew Baird	6	4	6
9	(Argentina) Facundo Díaz Acosta	6^{5}	2
Q	(United States) Govind Nanda	7^{7}	6
(Australia) Rinky Hijikata	6^{5}	4
(Spain) Nicolás Álvarez Varona	7^{7}	6
WC	(United Kingdom) Jake Hersey	3	1
Q	(Belgium) Louis Herman	6	6
(United States) Trey Hilderbrand	6^{4}	7^{7}	6
8	(Japan) Naoki Tajima	7^{7}	6^{1}	1

Second round
1	(Chinese Taipei) C-h Tseng	6	6
(France) A Cazaux	3	4
Q	(Czech Republic) O Štyler	6^{7}	7	6
15	(United States) D Baird	7^{9}	5	1
Q	(United States) G Nanda	6	4	2
(Spain) N Álvarez Varona	3	6	6
Q	(Belgium) L Herman	6	6^{4}	5
(United States) T Hilderbrand	1	7^{7}	7

Third round
1	(Chinese Taipei) C-h Tseng	6	6
Q	(Czech Republic) O Štyler	2	1
(Spain) N Álvarez Varona	1	3
(United States) T Hilderbrand	6	6

Quarterfinals
1	(Chinese Taipei) C-h Tseng	6	6
(United States) T Hilderbrand	2	4

==== Section 2 ====
First round
3	(United States) Sebastian Korda	3	6^{2}
(Finland) Otto Virtanen	6	7^{7}
(Switzerland) Damien Wenger	4	1
(Argentina) Thiago Agustín Tirante	6	6
WC	(United Kingdom) Anton Matusevich	6	7^{8}
(France) Clément Tabur	4	6^{6}
(Netherlands) Deney Wassermann	6	6
13	(Romania) Filip Cristian Jianu	3	4
10	(Czech Republic) Dalibor Svrčina	6	7
(Dominican Republic) Nick Hardt	3	5
WC	(United Kingdom) Connor Thomson	1	2
(China) Mu Tao	6	6
(United States) Brandon Nakashima	6	6
(Brazil) João Lucas Reis da Silva	2	0
WC	(United Kingdom) Blu Baker	3	4
6	(Kazakhstan) Timofey Skatov	6	6

Second round
(Finland) O Virtanen	6	3	6
(Argentina) TA Tirante	3	6	2
WC	(United Kingdom) A Matusevich	5	6	7
(Netherlands) D Wassermann	7	4	5
10	(Czech Republic) D Svrčina	1	4
(China) T Mu	6	6
(United States) B Nakashima	3	4
6	(Kazakhstan) T Skatov	6	6

Third round
(Finland) O Virtanen	1	3
WC	(United Kingdom) A Matusevich	6	6
(China) T Mu	6	6
6	(Kazakhstan) T Skatov	4	4

Quarterfinals
WC	(United Kingdom) A Matusevich	5	1
(China) T Mu	7	6

=== Bottom half ===
==== Section 3 ====
First round
7	(Bulgaria) Adrian Andreev	6	6
(Brazil) Mateus Alves	3	3
Q	(Switzerland) Henry von der Schulenburg	1	4
(United Kingdom) Jack Draper	6	6
(Netherlands) Jesper de Jong	6	7^{7}
Q	(France) Titouan Droguet	4	6^{3}
(Czech Republic) Jonáš Forejtek	6^{4}	7^{7}	4
11	(United States) Tristan Boyer	7^{7}	6^{5}	6
14	(Argentina) Juan Manuel Cerúndolo	4	6	7
WC	(United Kingdom) Harry Wendelken	6	4	5
(Italy) Lorenzo Musetti	6	6
(Chinese Taipei) Ray Ho	2	4
(United States) Emilio Nava	7^{7}	6
(Germany) Leopold Zima	6^{3}	4
(Russia) Savriyan Danilov	7^{8}	5	2
4	(France) Hugo Gaston	6^{6}	7	6

Second round
7	(Bulgaria) A Andreev	3	0
(United Kingdom) J Draper	6	6
(Netherlands) J de Jong	7^{8}	4	7
11	(United States) T Boyer	6^{6}	6	9
14	(Argentina) JM Cerúndolo	0	7^{7}	2
(Italy) L Musetti	6	6^{2}	6
(United States) E Nava	1	4
4	(France) H Gaston	6	6

Third round
(United Kingdom) J Draper	6^{1}	6	7
11	(United States) T Boyer	7^{7}	3	5
(Italy) L Musetti	7	6^{2}	6
4	(France) H Gaston	5	7^{7}	1

Quarterfinals
(United Kingdom) J Draper	6^{3}	6	6
(Italy) L Musetti	7^{7}	3	1

==== Section 4 ====
First round
5	(Colombia) Nicolás Mejía	7	7^{7}
(South Africa) Philip Henning	5	6^{2}
(Poland) Daniel Michalski	7^{7}	5	6
WC	(United Kingdom) Jacob Fearnley	6^{3}	7	3
(Romania) Ștefan Paloși	6^{5}	5
Q	(Japan) Taisei Ichikawa	7^{7}	7
(United States) Cannon Kingsley	6	6
12	(Spain) Carlos López Montagud	3	2
16	(United Kingdom) Aidan McHugh	6	2	3
(France) Harold Mayot	3	6	6
Q	(United States) Keenan Mayo	4	2
(Belgium) Arnaud Bovy	6	6
LL	(Uzbekistan) Sergey Fomin	6	6
(United States) Tyler Zink	4	3
(Brazil) Gilbert Soares Klier Júnior	6	6
2/WC	(Argentina) Sebastián Báez	2	4

Second round
5	(Colombia) N Mejía	7^{7}	6
(Poland) D Michalski	6^{2}	0
Q	(Japan) T Ichikawa	4	6	1
(United States) C Kingsley	6	1	6
(France) H Mayot	3	3
(Belgium) A Bovy	6	6
LL	(Uzbekistan) S Fomin	2	4
(Brazil) G Soares Klier Júnior	6	6

Third round
5	(Colombia) N Mejía	7^{7}	7
(United States) C Kingsley	6^{3}	5
(Belgium) A Bovy	3	2
(Brazil) G Soares Klier Júnior	6	6

Quarterfinals
5	(Colombia) N Mejía	7^{8}	7
(Brazil) G Soares Klier Júnior	6^{6}	5

== Qualifying ==
=== Seeds ===
1. (Czech Republic) Ondřej Štyler (qualified)
2. (Brazil) Igor Gimenez (qualifying competition)
3. (Argentina) Alejo Lorenzo Lingua Lavallén (qualifying competition)
4. (Uzbekistan) Sergey Fomin (qualifying competition; lucky loser)
5. (France) Titouan Droguet (qualified)
6. (United States) Govind Nanda (qualified)
7. (Ukraine) Pavlo Shumeiko (qualifying competition)
8. (Brazil) Matheus Pucinelli de Almeida (qualifying competition)
9. (Russia) Alexandr Binda (qualifying competition)
10. (Belgium) Gauthier Onclin (qualifying competition, withdrew)
11. (Bulgaria) Simon Anthony Ivanov (qualified)
12. (Belgium) Louis Herman (qualified)
13. (United States) Keenan Mayo (qualified)
14. (Switzerland) Henry von der Schulenburg (qualified)
15. (Italy) Davide Tortora (first round)
16. (Germany) Justin Schlageter (first round)

=== Qualifiers ===
1. (Czech Republic) Ondřej Štyler
2. (Belgium) Louis Herman
3. (Switzerland) Henry von der Schulenburg
4. (Bulgaria) Simon Anthony Ivanov
5. (France) Titouan Droguet
6. (United States) Govind Nanda
7. (United States) Keenan Mayo
8. (Japan) Taisei Ichikawa

=== Lucky loser ===
1. (Uzbekistan) Sergey Fomin

=== Draw ===
==== First qualifier ====
First round
1	(Czech Republic) Ondřej Štyler	6	6
WC	(United Kingdom) Barney Fitzpatrick	2	1
(Sweden) Erik Grevelius	3	4
10	(Belgium) Gauthier Onclin	6	6

Qualifying competition
1	(Czech Republic) Ondřej Štyler	w/o
10	(Belgium) Gauthier Onclin

==== Second qualifier ====
First round
2	(Brazil) Igor Gimenez	6	6
WC	(United Kingdom) George Davis	2	0
(Germany) Henri Squire	6	3	6
12	(Belgium) Louis Herman	4	6	8

Qualifying competition
2	(Brazil) Igor Gimenez	6	4	4
12	(Belgium) Louis Herman	3	6	6

==== Third qualifier ====
First round
3	(Argentina) Alejo Lorenzo Lingua Lavallén	6	6
(Kenya) Sheil Kotecha	1	2
WC	(United Kingdom) Ewen Lumsden	3	7	1
14	(Switzerland) Henry von der Schulenburg	6	5	6

Qualifying competition
3	(Argentina) Alejo Lorenzo Lingua Lavallén	6^{5}	1
14	(Switzerland) Henry von der Schulenburg	7^{7}	6

==== Fourth qualifier ====
First round
4	(Uzbekistan) Sergey Fomin	6	6
WC	(United Kingdom) Alexander Maggs	1	2
(United States) William Woodall	1	7	4
11	(Bulgaria) Simon Anthony Ivanov	6	5	6

Qualifying competition
4	(Uzbekistan) Sergey Fomin	3	4
11	(Bulgaria) Simon Anthony Ivanov	6	6

==== Fifth qualifier ====
First round
5	(France) Titouan Droguet	6	6
WC	(United Kingdom) Rahul Dhokia	0	0
(Netherlands) Lodewijk Weststrate	6	6
16	(Germany) Justin Schlageter	3	2

Qualifying competition
5	(France) Titouan Droguet	6	6
(Netherlands) Lodewijk Weststrate	2	2

==== Sixth qualifier ====
First round
6	(United States) Govind Nanda	6	6
(Brazil) João Ferreira	3	1
WC	(United Kingdom) Tad Maclean	6^{4}	7	6
9	(Russia) Alexandr Binda	7^{7}	5	8

Qualifying competition
6	(United States) Govind Nanda	6	6
9	(Russia) Alexandr Binda	4	2

==== Seventh qualifier ====
First round
7	(Ukraine) Pavlo Shumeiko	5	7^{8}	6
(United Kingdom) James Story	7	6^{6}	3
(South Africa) Lleyton Cronje	5	4
13	(United States) Keenan Mayo	7	6

Qualifying competition
7	(Ukraine) Pavlo Shumeiko	6^{8}	3
13	(United States) Keenan Mayo	7^{10}	6

==== Eighth qualifier ====
First round
8	(Brazil) Matheus Pucinelli de Almeida	6	4	6
(Estonia) Daniil Glinka	4	6	1
(Japan) Taisei Ichikawa	6	1	7
15	(Italy) Davide Tortora	3	6	5

Qualifying competition
8	(Brazil) Matheus Pucinelli de Almeida	4	1
(Japan) Taisei Ichikawa	6	6
