= 2018 Wimbledon Championships – Senior gentlemen's invitation doubles =

Senior gentlemen's invitation doubles
- 2018 Wimbledon Championships

Final
- Champions: (Sweden) Jonas Björkman (Australia) Todd Woodbridge
- Runners-up: (Netherlands) Richard Krajicek (United Kingdom) Mark Petchey
- Score: 6–4, 6–3

Events
Singles	men	women		boys	girls
Doubles	men	women	mixed	boys	girls
WC Singles	men	women	quad
WC Doubles	men	women	quad
Legends	men	women	seniors
← 2017 ·	Wimbledon Championships	· 2019 →

Jacco Eltingh and Paul Haarhuis were the defending champions, but were eliminated in the round robin competition when they withdrew from their third match.

Jonas Björkman and Todd Woodbridge won the title, defeating Richard Krajicek and Mark Petchey in the final, 6–4, 6–3.

== Draw ==
=== Key ===
- Q = Qualifier
- WC = Wild card
- LL = Lucky loser
- Alt = Alternate
- ITF = ITF entry
- PR = Protected ranking
- SR = Special ranking
- SE = Special exempt
- JE = Junior exempt
- JR = Junior Accelerator Programme entrant
- CO = College Accelerator Programme entrant
- NG = Next Gen Accelerator Program entrant
- w/o = Walkover
- r = Retired
- d = Defaulted

=== Final ===
Final
A3	(Sweden) Jonas Björkman (Australia) Todd Woodbridge	6	6
B2	(Netherlands) Richard Krajicek (United Kingdom) Mark Petchey	4	3

=== Group A ===
		(France) Bahrami (Croatia) Ivanišević	(United Kingdom) Bates (United Kingdom) Castle	(Sweden) Björkman (Australia) Woodbridge	(Netherlands) Eltingh (Netherlands) Haarhuis	RR; W–L	Set; W–L	Game; W–L	Standings
A1	(France) Mansour Bahrami (Croatia) Goran Ivanišević		4–6, 6–7^{(4–7)}	4–6, 6–4, [7–10]	4–6, 3–6	0–3	1–6	27–36	4
A2	(United Kingdom) Jeremy Bates (United Kingdom) Andrew Castle	6–4, 7–6^{(7–4)}		6–7^{(6–8)}, 2–6	4–6, 3–6	1–2	2–4	28–35	3
A3	(Sweden) Jonas Björkman (Australia) Todd Woodbridge	6–4, 4–6, [10–7]	7–6^{(8–6)}, 6–2		w/o	3–0	4–1	24–18	1
A4	(Netherlands) Jacco Eltingh (Netherlands) Paul Haarhuis	6–4, 6–3	6–4, 6–3	w/o		2–1	4–0	24–14	2

=== Group B ===
		(South Africa) Ferreira (Australia) Woodforde	(Netherlands) Krajicek (United Kingdom) Petchey	(France) Leconte (France) Pioline	(United States) McEnroe (United States) Tarango	RR; W–L	Set; W–L	Game; W–L	Standings
B1	(South Africa) Wayne Ferreira (Australia) Mark Woodforde		6–7^{(6–8)}, 4–6	7–6^{(14–12)}, 6–3	6–2, 6–3	2–1	4–2	35–27	2
B2	(Netherlands) Richard Krajicek (United Kingdom) Mark Petchey	7–6^{(8–6)}, 6–4		6–3, 6–3	6–4, 6–2	3–0	6–0	37–22	1
B3	(France) Henri Leconte (France) Cédric Pioline	6–7^{(12–14)}, 3–6	3–6, 3–6		6–4, 7–5	1–2	2–4	28–34	3
B4	(United States) Patrick McEnroe (United States) Jeff Tarango	2–6, 3–6	4–6, 2–6	4–6, 5–7		0–3	0–6	20–37	4
