= 2018 Wimbledon Championships – Gentlemen's invitation doubles =

Gentlemen's invitation doubles
- 2018 Wimbledon Championships

Final
- Champions: (Germany) Tommy Haas (Australia) Mark Philippoussis
- Runners-up: (United Kingdom) Colin Fleming (Belgium) Xavier Malisse
- Score: 7–6^{(7–4)}, 6–4

Events
Singles	men	women		boys	girls
Doubles	men	women	mixed	boys	girls
WC Singles	men	women	quad
WC Doubles	men	women	quad
Legends	men	women	seniors
← 2017 ·	Wimbledon Championships	· 2019 →

Lleyton Hewitt and Mark Philippoussis were the defending champions, but Hewitt accepted a wildcard to compete in the men's doubles main draw instead. Philippoussis played alongside Tommy Haas, and successfully defended his title, defeating Colin Fleming and Xavier Malisse in the final, 7–6^{(7–4)}, 6–4.

== Draw ==
=== Key ===
- Q = Qualifier
- WC = Wild card
- LL = Lucky loser
- Alt = Alternate
- ITF = ITF entry
- PR = Protected ranking
- SR = Special ranking
- SE = Special exempt
- JE = Junior exempt
- JR = Junior Accelerator Programme entrant
- CO = College Accelerator Programme entrant
- NG = Next Gen Accelerator Program entrant
- w/o = Walkover
- r = Retired
- d = Defaulted

=== Final ===
Final
A2	(United Kingdom) Colin Fleming (Belgium) Xavier Malisse	6^{4}	4
B4	(Germany) Tommy Haas (Australia) Mark Philippoussis	7^{7}	6

=== Group A ===
		(France) Clément (United Kingdom) Maclagan	(United Kingdom) Fleming (Belgium) Malisse	(United States) Gimelstob (United Kingdom) Hutchins	(United Kingdom) Rusedski (France) Santoro	RR; W–L	Set; W–L	Game; W–L	Standings
A1	(France) Arnaud Clément (United Kingdom) Miles Maclagan		6–7^{(9–11)}, 6–3, [3–10]	2–6, 5–7	7–5, 6–3	1–2	3–4	32–32	2
A2	(United Kingdom) Colin Fleming (Belgium) Xavier Malisse	7–6^{(11–9)}, 3–6, [10–3]		7–5, 7–6^{(7–3)}	6–4, 7–5	3–0	6–1	38–32	1
A3	(United States) Justin Gimelstob (United Kingdom) Ross Hutchins	6–2, 7–5	5–7, 6–7^{(3–7)}		1–6, 4–6	1–2	2–4	29–33	4
A4	(United Kingdom) Greg Rusedski (France) Fabrice Santoro	5–7, 3–6	4–6, 5–7	6–1, 6–4		1–2	2–4	29–31	3

=== Group B ===
		(United Kingdom) Delgado (United Kingdom) Marray	(Sweden) Enqvist (Sweden) Johansson	(Chile) González (France) Grosjean	(Germany) Haas (Australia) Philippoussis	RR; W–L	Set; W–L	Game; W–L	Standings
B1	(United Kingdom) Jamie Delgado (United Kingdom) Jonathan Marray		6–7^{(3–7)}, 3–6	6–4, 3–6, [7–10]	3–6, 4–6	0–3	1–6	25–36	4
B2	(Sweden) Thomas Enqvist (Sweden) Thomas Johansson	7–6^{(7–3)}, 6–3		5–7, 6–4, [10–4]	2–6, 7–6^{(7–3)}, [8–10]	2–1	5–3	34–33	2
B3	(Chile) Fernando González (France) Sébastien Grosjean	4–6, 6–3, [10–7]	7–5, 4–6, [4–10]		3–6, 4–6	1–2	3–5	29–33	3
B4	(Germany) Tommy Haas (Australia) Mark Philippoussis	6–3, 6–4	6–2, 6–7^{(3–7)}, [10–8]	6–3, 6–4		3–0	6–1	37–23	1
