= 2018 Wimbledon Championships – Boys' doubles =

Boys' doubles
- 2018 Wimbledon Championships

Final
- Champions: (Turkey) Yankı Erel (Finland) Otto Virtanen
- Runners-up: (Colombia) Nicolás Mejía (Czech Republic) Ondřej Štyler
- Score: 7–6^{(7–5)}, 6–4

Events
Singles	men	women		boys	girls
Doubles	men	women	mixed	boys	girls
WC Singles	men	women	quad
WC Doubles	men	women	quad
Legends	men	women	seniors
← 2017 ·	Wimbledon Championships	· 2019 →

Axel Geller and Hsu Yu-hsiou were the defending champions, but both players were ineligible to participate in junior events.

Yankı Erel and Otto Virtanen won the title, defeating Nicolás Mejía and Ondřej Štyler in the final, 7–6^{(7–5)}, 6–4.

== Seeds ==
1. (Chinese Taipei) Ray Ho / (Chinese Taipei) Tseng Chun-hsin (second round)
2. (United Kingdom) Aidan McHugh / (Kazakhstan) Timofei Skatov (quarterfinals)
3. (France) Hugo Gaston / (France) Clément Tabur (quarterfinals)
4. (Argentina) Juan Manuel Cerúndolo / (Spain) Carlos López Montagud (first round)
5. (Bulgaria) Adrian Andreev / (Dominican Republic) Nick Hardt (first round)
6. (Colombia) Nicolás Mejía / (Czech Republic) Ondřej Štyler (final)
7. (Spain) Nicolás Álvarez Varona / (Argentina) Facundo Díaz Acosta (first round)
8. (Argentina) Sebastián Báez / (Brazil) Gilbert Soares Klier Júnior (first round)

== Draw ==
=== Key ===
- Q = Qualifier
- WC = Wild card
- LL = Lucky loser
- Alt = Alternate
- ITF = ITF entry
- PR = Protected ranking
- SR = Special ranking
- SE = Special exempt
- JE = Junior exempt
- JR = Junior Accelerator Programme entrant
- CO = College Accelerator Programme entrant
- NG = Next Gen Accelerator Program entrant
- w/o = Walkover
- r = Retired
- d = Defaulted

=== Finals ===
Semifinals
(Australia) Rinky Hijikata (Japan) Naoki Tajima	3	6^{4}
6	(Colombia) Nicolás Mejía (Czech Republic) Ondřej Štyler	6	7^{7}
(Turkey) Yankı Erel (Finland) Otto Virtanen	7^{7}	7^{7}
WC	(United Kingdom) James Story (United Kingdom) Harry Wendelken	6^{0}	6^{5}

Final
6	(Colombia) Nicolás Mejía (Czech Republic) Ondřej Štyler	6^{5}	4
(Turkey) Yankı Erel (Finland) Otto Virtanen	7^{7}	6

=== Top half ===
First round
1	(Chinese Taipei) Ray Ho (Chinese Taipei) Tseng Chun-hsin	6	6
WC	(United Kingdom) Tad Maclean (United Kingdom) Anton Matusevich	1	4
(Romania) Filip Cristian Jianu (Argentina) Thiago Agustín Tirante	6^{0}	4
(Australia) Rinky Hijikata (Japan) Naoki Tajima	7^{7}	6
(Poland) Daniel Michalski (Romania) Ștefan Paloși	3	3
(United States) Tristan Boyer (United States) William Woodall	6	6
(Brazil) Matheus Pucinelli de Almeida (Brazil) João Lucas Reis da Silva	6	3	6
5	(Bulgaria) Adrian Andreev (Dominican Republic) Nick Hardt	0	6	4
4	(Argentina) Juan Manuel Cerúndolo (Spain) Carlos López Montagud	1	4
(Czech Republic) Jonáš Forejtek (Czech Republic) Dalibor Svrčina	6	6
(United States) Brandon Nakashima (United States) Tyler Zink	6	7
(South Africa) Philip Henning (France) Harold Mayot	4	5
(China) Mu Tao (Germany) Leopold Zima	5	7^{7}	6
WC	(United Kingdom) Jacob Fearnley (United Kingdom) Connor Thomson	7	6^{4}	4
(United States) Cannon Kingsley (United States) Emilio Nava	1	3
6	(Colombia) Nicolás Mejía (Czech Republic) Ondřej Štyler	6	6

Second round
1	(Chinese Taipei) R Ho (Chinese Taipei) C-h Tseng	6^{8}	1
(Australia) R Hijikata (Japan) N Tajima	7^{10}	6
(United States) T Boyer (United States) W Woodall	3	1
(Brazil) M Pucinelli de Almeida (Brazil) JL Reis da Silva	6	6
(Czech Republic) J Forejtek (Czech Republic) D Svrčina	7^{7}	4	3
(United States) B Nakashima (United States) T Zink	6^{4}	6	6
(China) T Mu (Germany) L Zima	3	6	6
6	(Colombia) N Mejía (Czech Republic) O Štyler	6	3	8

Quarterfinals
(Australia) R Hijikata (Japan) N Tajima	7^{7}	7^{8}
(Brazil) M Pucinelli de Almeida (Brazil) JL Reis da Silva	6^{4}	6^{6}
(United States) B Nakashima (United States) T Zink	3	4
6	(Colombia) N Mejía (Czech Republic) O Štyler	6	6

Semifinals
(Australia) R Hijikata (Japan) N Tajima	3	6^{4}
6	(Colombia) N Mejía (Czech Republic) O Štyler	6	7^{7}

=== Bottom half ===
First round
8	(Argentina) Sebastián Báez (Brazil) Gilbert Soares Klier Júnior	3	6^{4}
(Turkey) Yankı Erel (Finland) Otto Virtanen	6	7^{7}
(United States) Drew Baird (United States) Keenan Mayo	3	6	5
(France) Titouan Droguet (Bulgaria) Simon Anthony Ivanov	6	4	7
WC	(United Kingdom) Jack Draper (United Kingdom) Emile Hudd	4	4
(Russia) Savriyan Danilov (Switzerland) Henry von der Schulenburg	6	6
(Brazil) Mateus Alves (Poland) Wojciech Marek	1	0
3	(France) Hugo Gaston (France) Clément Tabur	6	6
7	(Spain) Nicolás Álvarez Varona (Argentina) Facundo Díaz Acosta	1	6	3
(Italy) Lorenzo Musetti (Netherlands) Deney Wassermann	6	3	6
WC	(United Kingdom) James Story (United Kingdom) Harry Wendelken	7^{8}	7
(Belgium) Arnaud Bovy (France) Arthur Cazaux	6^{6}	5
(Belgium) Louis Herman (Japan) Taisei Ichikawa	6	3	4
(Netherlands) Jesper de Jong (Switzerland) Damien Wenger	3	6	6
(United States) Trey Hilderbrand (United States) Govind Nanda	6^{5}	4
2	(United Kingdom) Aidan McHugh (Kazakhstan) Timofei Skatov	7^{7}	6

Second round
(Turkey) Y Erel (Finland) O Virtanen	3	7^{6}	6
(France) T Droguet (Bulgaria) SA Ivanov	6	6^{6}	4
(Russia) S Danilov (Switzerland) H von der Schulenburg	4	6^{2}
3	(France) H Gaston (France) C Tabur	6	7^{7}
(Italy) L Musetti (Netherlands) D Wassermann	6^{4}	6	3
WC	(United Kingdom) J Story (United Kingdom) H Wendelken	7^{7}	3	6
(Netherlands) J de Jong (Switzerland) D Wenger	3	4
2	(United Kingdom) A McHugh (Kazakhstan) T Skatov	6	6

Quarterfinals
(Turkey) Y Erel (Finland) O Virtanen	7	7^{7}
3	(France) H Gaston (France) C Tabur	5	6^{5}
WC	(United Kingdom) J Story (United Kingdom) H Wendelken	4	7^{7}	6
2	(United Kingdom) A McHugh (Kazakhstan) T Skatov	6	6^{2}	2

Semifinals
(Turkey) Y Erel (Finland) O Virtanen	7^{7}	7^{7}
WC	(United Kingdom) J Story (United Kingdom) H Wendelken	6^{0}	6^{5}
