= 2018 Wimbledon Championships – Wheelchair men's singles =

Wheelchair men's singles
- 2018 Wimbledon Championships

Final
- Champion: (Sweden) Stefan Olsson
- Runner-up: (Argentina) Gustavo Fernández
- Score: 6–2, 0–6, 6–3

Events
Singles	men	women		boys	girls
Doubles	men	women	mixed	boys	girls
WC Singles	men	women	quad
WC Doubles	men	women	quad
Legends	men	women	seniors
← 2017 ·	Wimbledon Championships	· 2019 →

Defending champion Stefan Olsson defeated Gustavo Fernández in the final, 6–2, 0–6, 6–3 to win the gentlemen's singles wheelchair tennis title at the 2018 Wimbledon Championships.

== Seeds ==
1. (Japan) Shingo Kunieda (quarterfinals)
2. (United Kingdom) Alfie Hewett (semifinals)

== Draw ==
=== Key ===
- Q = Qualifier
- WC = Wild card
- LL = Lucky loser
- Alt = Alternate
- ITF = ITF entry
- PR = Protected ranking
- SR = Special ranking
- SE = Special exempt
- JE = Junior exempt
- JR = Junior Accelerator Programme entrant
- CO = College Accelerator Programme entrant
- NG = Next Gen Accelerator Program entrant
- w/o = Walkover
- r = Retired
- d = Defaulted

=== Finals ===
Quarterfinals
1	(Japan) Shingo Kunieda	4	6	5
(Argentina) Gustavo Fernández	6	3	7
(United Kingdom) Gordon Reid	3	3
WC	(Belgium) Joachim Gérard	6	6
(France) Nicolas Peifer	2	3
(Sweden) Stefan Olsson	6	6
(France) Stéphane Houdet	6^{3}	4
2	(United Kingdom) Alfie Hewett	7^{7}	6

Semifinals
(Argentina) Gustavo Fernández	6	4	6
WC	(Belgium) Joachim Gérard	1	6	2
(Sweden) Stefan Olsson	6	6
2	(United Kingdom) Alfie Hewett	2	4

Final
(Argentina) Gustavo Fernández	2	6	3
(Sweden) Stefan Olsson	6	0	6
