= 2018 Wimbledon Championships – Wheelchair men's doubles =

Wheelchair men's doubles
- 2018 Wimbledon Championships

Final
- Champions: (United Kingdom) Alfie Hewett (United Kingdom) Gordon Reid
- Runners-up: (Belgium) Joachim Gérard (Sweden) Stefan Olsson
- Score: 6–1, 6–4

Events
Singles	men	women		boys	girls
Doubles	men	women	mixed	boys	girls
WC Singles	men	women	quad
WC Doubles	men	women	quad
Legends	men	women	seniors
← 2017 ·	Wimbledon Championships	· 2019 →

Two-time defending champions Alfie Hewett and Gordon Reid defeated Joachim Gérard and Stefan Olsson in the final, 6–1, 6–4 to win the gentlemen's doubles wheelchair tennis title at the 2018 Wimbledon Championships.

== Seeds ==
1. (France) Stéphane Houdet / (France) Nicolas Peifer (semifinals)
2. (United Kingdom) Alfie Hewett / (United Kingdom) Gordon Reid (champions)

== Draw ==
=== Key ===
- Q = Qualifier
- WC = Wild card
- LL = Lucky loser
- Alt = Alternate
- ITF = ITF entry
- PR = Protected ranking
- SR = Special ranking
- SE = Special exempt
- JE = Junior exempt
- JR = Junior Accelerator Programme entrant
- CO = College Accelerator Programme entrant
- NG = Next Gen Accelerator Program entrant
- w/o = Walkover
- r = Retired
- d = Defaulted

=== Finals ===
Semifinals
1	(France) Stéphane Houdet (France) Nicolas Peifer	1	6	5
(Belgium) Joachim Gérard (Sweden) Stefan Olsson	6	3	7
(Argentina) Gustavo Fernández (Japan) Shingo Kunieda	4	6	6^{3}
2	(United Kingdom) Alfie Hewett (United Kingdom) Gordon Reid	6	3	7^{7}

Final
(Belgium) Joachim Gérard (Sweden) Stefan Olsson	1	4
2	(United Kingdom) Alfie Hewett (United Kingdom) Gordon Reid	6	6
