= 2018 Wimbledon Championships – Wheelchair women's doubles =

Wheelchair women's doubles
- 2018 Wimbledon Championships

Final
- Champions: (Netherlands) Diede de Groot (Japan) Yui Kamiji
- Runners-up: (Germany) Sabine Ellerbrock (United Kingdom) Lucy Shuker
- Score: 6–1, 6–1

Events
Singles	men	women		boys	girls
Doubles	men	women	mixed	boys	girls
WC Singles	men	women	quad
WC Doubles	men	women	quad
Legends	men	women	seniors
← 2017 ·	Wimbledon Championships	· 2019 →

Four-time defending champion Yui Kamiji and her partner Diede de Groot defeated Sabine Ellerbrock and Lucy Shuker in the final, 6–1, 6–1 to win the ladies' doubles wheelchair tennis title at the 2018 Wimbledon Championships.

Kamiji and Jordanne Whiley were the four-time reigning champions, but Whiley did not participate due to maternity leave.

== Seeds ==
1. (Netherlands) Diede de Groot / (Japan) Yui Kamiji (champions)
2. (Netherlands) Marjolein Buis / (Netherlands) Aniek van Koot (semifinals)

== Draw ==
=== Key ===
- Q = Qualifier
- WC = Wild card
- LL = Lucky loser
- Alt = Alternate
- ITF = ITF entry
- PR = Protected ranking
- SR = Special ranking
- SE = Special exempt
- JE = Junior exempt
- JR = Junior Accelerator Programme entrant
- CO = College Accelerator Programme entrant
- NG = Next Gen Accelerator Program entrant
- w/o = Walkover
- r = Retired
- d = Defaulted

=== Finals ===
Semifinals
1	(Netherlands) Diede de Groot (Japan) Yui Kamiji	6	6
(Germany) Katharina Krüger (South Africa) Kgothatso Montjane	0	0
(Germany) Sabine Ellerbrock (United Kingdom) Lucy Shuker	3	6	6
2	(Netherlands) Marjolein Buis (Netherlands) Aniek van Koot	6	4	4

Final
1	(Netherlands) Diede de Groot (Japan) Yui Kamiji	6	6
(Germany) Sabine Ellerbrock (United Kingdom) Lucy Shuker	1	1

== Sources ==
- WC Women's Doubles
