= 2018 Wimbledon Championships – Men's singles qualifying =

Men's singles qualifying
- 2018 Wimbledon Championships

Events
| Singles | men | women | | boys | girls |
| Doubles | men | women | mixed | boys | girls |
| WC Singles | men | women | quad |
| WC Doubles | men | women | quad |
| Legends | men | women | seniors |

Qualification
| Singles | men | women |
| Doubles | men | women |
- Wimbledon Championships

Players and pairs who neither have high enough rankings nor receive wild cards may participate in a qualifying tournament held one week before the annual Wimbledon Tennis Championships.

== Seeds ==
1. (Spain) Jaume Munar (first round)
2. (Belgium) Ruben Bemelmans (qualified)
3. (Belarus) Ilya Ivashka (first round)
4. (Sweden) Elias Ymer (first round)
5. (Estonia) Jürgen Zopp (second round)
6. (Austria) Gerald Melzer (second round)
7. (Germany) Yannick Hanfmann (first round)
8. (Canada) Peter Polansky (qualifying competition, lucky loser)
9. (Bolivia) Hugo Dellien (first round)
10. (Spain) Marcel Granollers (second round)
11. (Poland) Hubert Hurkacz (qualifying competition, lucky loser)
12. (Italy) Lorenzo Sonego (qualifying competition, lucky loser)
13. (France) Quentin Halys (first round)
14. (United States) Bjorn Fratangelo (second round)
15. (India) Ramkumar Ramanathan (first round)
16. (Italy) Thomas Fabbiano (qualified)
17. (France) Nicolas Mahut (second round)
18. (France) Calvin Hemery (first round, retired)
19. (United States) Michael Mmoh (qualifying competition, lucky loser)
20. (Germany) Yannick Maden (qualified)
21. (United States) Donald Young (second round)
22. (Switzerland) Henri Laaksonen (second round)
23. (Brazil) Thiago Monteiro (first round)
24. (Russia) Alexey Vatutin (first round)
25. (Italy) Stefano Travaglia (qualified)
26. (Czech Republic) Adam Pavlásek (second round)
27. (Latvia) Ernests Gulbis (qualified)
28. (El Salvador) Marcelo Arévalo (first round)
29. (Austria) Sebastian Ofner (first round)
30. (Australia) Bernard Tomic (qualifying competition, lucky loser)
31. (Norway) Casper Ruud (first round)
32. (Kazakhstan) Alexander Bublik (second round)

== Qualifiers ==
1. (United States) Christian Harrison
2. (Belgium) Ruben Bemelmans
3. (Austria) Dennis Novak
4. (France) Grégoire Barrère
5. (Italy) Stefano Travaglia
6. (Slovakia) Norbert Gombos
7. (France) Stéphane Robert
8. (Australia) Jason Kubler
9. (Germany) Yannick Maden
10. (Australia) John-Patrick Smith
11. (Chile) Christian Garín
12. (Latvia) Ernests Gulbis
13. (Australia) Alex Bolt
14. (France) Benjamin Bonzi
15. (United States) Bradley Klahn
16. (Italy) Thomas Fabbiano

== Lucky losers ==
1. (Australia) Bernard Tomic
2. (Canada) Peter Polansky
3. (United States) Michael Mmoh
4. (Poland) Hubert Hurkacz
5. (Italy) Lorenzo Sonego
6. (Italy) Simone Bolelli
7. (Chinese Taipei) Jason Jung

== Qualifying draw ==
=== First qualifier ===
First round
1 | (Spain) Jaume Munar | 6^{6} | 7 | 8
(Argentina) Andrea Collarini | 7^{8} | 5 | 10
(Canada) Brayden Schnur | 6 | 7
PR | (Colombia) Santiago Giraldo | 4 | 5
(Portugal) Gonçalo Oliveira | 3 | 1
(United States) Christian Harrison | 6 | 6
(United States) Dennis Novikov | 5
18 | (France) Calvin Hemery | 1^{r}

Second round
(Argentina) Andrea Collarini | 1 | 2
(Canada) Brayden Schnur | 6 | 6
(United States) Christian Harrison | 7^{7} | 4 | 6
(United States) Dennis Novikov | 6^{2} | 6 | 3

Qualifying competition
(Canada) Brayden Schnur | 6^{3} | 5 | 1
(United States) Christian Harrison | 7^{7} | 7 | 6

=== Second qualifier ===
First round
2 | (Belgium) Ruben Bemelmans | 6 | 6
(United States) Christopher Eubanks | 4 | 4
(Serbia) Miomir Kecmanović | 3 | 4
(Spain) Enrique López Pérez | 6 | 6
(Australia) Akira Santillan | 3 | 6^{7}
(Bosnia and Herzegovina) Tomislav Brkić | 6 | 7^{9}
(Italy) Matteo Donati | 6^{1} | 3
30 | (Australia) Bernard Tomic | 7^{7} | 6

Second round
2 | (Belgium) Ruben Bemelmans | 6 | 6
(Spain) Enrique López Pérez | 4 | 2
(Bosnia and Herzegovina) Tomislav Brkić | 2 | 4
30 | (Australia) Bernard Tomic | 6 | 6

Qualifying competition
2 | (Belgium) Ruben Bemelmans | 6 | 6 | 6
30 | (Australia) Bernard Tomic | 3 | 1 | 2

=== Third qualifier ===
First round
3 | (Belarus) Ilya Ivashka | 4 | 4
WC | (United Kingdom) Dan Evans | 6 | 6
(Australia) Marc Polmans | 3 | 6 | 6
(Germany) Matthias Bachinger | 6 | 4 | 8
PR | (Belarus) Egor Gerasimov | 2 | 2
(Austria) Dennis Novak | 6 | 6
(Australia) Max Purcell | 3 | 2
21 | (United States) Donald Young | 6 | 6

Second round
WC | (United Kingdom) Dan Evans | 0 | 3
(Germany) Matthias Bachinger | 6 | 6
(Austria) Dennis Novak | 6 | 7
21 | (United States) Donald Young | 2 | 5

Qualifying competition
(Germany) Matthias Bachinger | 2 | 4 | 2
(Austria) Dennis Novak | 6 | 6 | 6

=== Fourth qualifier ===
First round
4 | (Sweden) Elias Ymer | 4 | 6^{7}
(Italy) Stefano Napolitano | 6 | 7^{9}
(Italy) Salvatore Caruso | 6 | 6
(Spain) Adrián Menéndez Maceiras | 2 | 2
(Hungary) Attila Balázs | 6 | 5 | 6
(South Korea) Lee Duck-hee | 3 | 7 | 1
(France) Grégoire Barrère | 6 | 2 | 6
23 | (Brazil) Thiago Monteiro | 4 | 6 | 3

Second round
(Italy) Stefano Napolitano | 5 | 6 | 6
(Italy) Salvatore Caruso | 7 | 2 | 2
(Hungary) Attila Balázs | 6^{8} | 4
(France) Grégoire Barrère | 7^{10} | 6

Qualifying competition
(Italy) Stefano Napolitano | 1 | 6^{2} | 2
(France) Grégoire Barrère | 6 | 7^{7} | 6

=== Fifth qualifier ===
First round
5 | (Estonia) Jürgen Zopp | 7^{7} | 6
WC | (United Kingdom) George Loffhagen | 6^{4} | 0
(Italy) Alessandro Giannessi | 6 | 6
(Serbia) Danilo Petrović | 3 | 3
(Germany) Mats Moraing | 6 | 6
(South Africa) Lloyd Harris | 4 | 2
(Russia) Ivan Nedelko | 4 | 2
25 | (Italy) Stefano Travaglia | 6 | 6

Second round
5 | (Estonia) Jürgen Zopp | 3 | 7^{10} | 11
(Italy) Alessandro Giannessi | 6 | 6^{8} | 13
(Germany) Mats Moraing | 4 | 4
25 | (Italy) Stefano Travaglia | 6 | 6

Qualifying competition
(Italy) Alessandro Giannessi | 4 | 2 | 4
25 | (Italy) Stefano Travaglia | 6 | 6 | 6

=== Sixth qualifier ===
First round
6 | (Austria) Gerald Melzer | 6 | 6
(Croatia) Nino Serdarušić | 4 | 4
(Germany) Dominik Köpfer | 6 | 6
(Japan) Tatsuma Ito | 4 | 3
(Slovakia) Norbert Gombos | 6 | 6
(France) Gleb Sakharov | 2 | 3
(Spain) Daniel Gimeno Traver | 6 | 5 | 9
29 | (Austria) Sebastian Ofner | 4 | 7 | 7

Second round
6 | (Austria) Gerald Melzer | 6 | 4 | 2
(Germany) Dominik Köpfer | 2 | 6 | 6
(Slovakia) Norbert Gombos | 6 | 6
(Spain) Daniel Gimeno Traver | 1 | 3

Qualifying competition
(Germany) Dominik Köpfer | 6 | 3 | 6 | 4 | 5
(Slovakia) Norbert Gombos | 2 | 6 | 2 | 6 | 7

=== Seventh qualifier ===
First round
7 | (Germany) Yannick Hanfmann | 5 | 6^{7}
(France) Stéphane Robert | 7 | 7^{9}
(Spain) Sergio Gutiérrez Ferrol | 5 | 5
WC | (United Kingdom) Lloyd Glasspool | 7 | 7
(United States) Kevin King | 2 | 2
(Italy) Luca Vanni | 6 | 6
(Slovenia) Blaž Rola | 6 | 4 | 6
24 | (Russia) Alexey Vatutin | 4 | 6 | 3

Second round
(France) Stéphane Robert | 7 | 6
WC | (United Kingdom) Lloyd Glasspool | 5 | 4
(Italy) Luca Vanni | 6^{5} | 6 | 6
(Slovenia) Blaž Rola | 7^{7} | 4 | 3

Qualifying competition
(France) Stéphane Robert | 6 | 3 | 7 | 6
(Italy) Luca Vanni | 4 | 6 | 5 | 1

=== Eighth qualifier ===
First round
8 | (Canada) Peter Polansky | 4 | 6 | 6
(Chinese Taipei) Yang Tsung-hua | 6 | 3 | 2
WC | (United Kingdom) Aidan McHugh | 2 | 4
WC | (Spain) Alejandro Davidovich Fokina | 6 | 6
(Belgium) Arthur De Greef | 1 | 2
(Australia) Jason Kubler | 6 | 6
(United States) Evan King | 3 | 4
26 | (Czech Republic) Adam Pavlásek | 6 | 6

Second round
8 | (Canada) Peter Polansky | 7 | 6
WC | (Spain) Alejandro Davidovich Fokina | 5 | 2
(Australia) Jason Kubler | 3 | 6 | 12
26 | (Czech Republic) Adam Pavlásek | 6 | 3 | 10

Qualifying competition
8 | (Canada) Peter Polansky | 6^{5} | 3 | 7^{8} | 4
(Australia) Jason Kubler | 7^{7} | 6 | 6^{6} | 6

=== Ninth qualifier ===
First round
9 | (Bolivia) Hugo Dellien | 4 | 2
(Japan) Go Soeda | 6 | 6
(Slovakia) Jozef Kovalík | 3 | 7^{7} | 2
PR | (Austria) Jürgen Melzer | 6 | 6^{3} | 6
(Germany) Dustin Brown | 3 | 1
(United States) Stefan Kozlov | 6 | 6
PR | (Ukraine) Illya Marchenko | 6 | 3 | 4
20 | (Germany) Yannick Maden | 4 | 6 | 6

Second round
(Japan) Go Soeda | 3 | 2
PR | (Austria) Jürgen Melzer | 6 | 6
(United States) Stefan Kozlov | 1 | 3
20 | (Germany) Yannick Maden | 6 | 6

Qualifying competition
PR | (Austria) Jürgen Melzer | 7 | 6 | 6^{6} | 4 | 3
20 | (Germany) Yannick Maden | 5 | 3 | 7^{8} | 6 | 6

=== Tenth qualifier ===
First round
10 | (Spain) Marcel Granollers | 6 | 6
(Germany) Oscar Otte | 4 | 3
(Australia) John-Patrick Smith | 6^{5} | 6 | 8
(Belarus) Uladzimir Ignatik | 7^{7} | 1 | 6
(Egypt) Mohamed Safwat | 6 | 6
WC | (United Kingdom) Jack Draper | 4 | 4
(United States) Noah Rubin | 6^{6} | 2
19 | (United States) Michael Mmoh | 7^{8} | 6

Second round
10 | (Spain) Marcel Granollers | 3 | 4
(Australia) John-Patrick Smith | 6 | 6
(Egypt) Mohamed Safwat | 6^{3} | 6 | 0
19 | (United States) Michael Mmoh | 7^{7} | 4 | 6

Qualifying competition
(Australia) John-Patrick Smith | 6 | 6 | 6
19 | (United States) Michael Mmoh | 2 | 4 | 3

=== Eleventh qualifier ===
First round
11 | (Poland) Hubert Hurkacz | 3 | 7^{7} | 7
(France) Kenny de Schepper | 6 | 6^{3} | 5
(United States) Mitchell Krueger | 7 | 3 | 4
(United States) Reilly Opelka | 5 | 6 | 6
(Argentina) Juan Ignacio Londero | 3 | 4
(Chile) Christian Garín | 6 | 6
(Colombia) Daniel Elahi Galán | 6 | 6^{5} | 2
17 | (France) Nicolas Mahut | 1 | 7^{7} | 6

Second round
11 | (Poland) Hubert Hurkacz | 6 | 7
(United States) Reilly Opelka | 3 | 5
(Chile) Christian Garín | 6 | 5 | 6
17 | (France) Nicolas Mahut | 4 | 7 | 2

Qualifying competition
11 | (Poland) Hubert Hurkacz | 2 | 2 | 5
(Chile) Christian Garín | 6 | 6 | 7

=== Twelfth qualifier ===
First round
12 | (Italy) Lorenzo Sonego | 7^{7} | 7
(Czech Republic) Václav Šafránek | 6^{4} | 5
(Japan) Yasutaka Uchiyama | 5 | 0
(France) Constant Lestienne | 7 | 6
(Czech Republic) Zdeněk Kolář | 6 | 7^{7}
WC | (United Kingdom) Anton Matusevich | 1 | 6^{1}
(Canada) Filip Peliwo | 5 | 2
27 | (Latvia) Ernests Gulbis | 7 | 6

Second round
12 | (Italy) Lorenzo Sonego | 6 | 4 | 6
(France) Constant Lestienne | 4 | 6 | 2
(Czech Republic) Zdeněk Kolář | 6 | 3 | 3
27 | (Latvia) Ernests Gulbis | 4 | 6 | 6

Qualifying competition
12 | (Italy) Lorenzo Sonego | 2 | 6 | 4 | 3
27 | (Latvia) Ernests Gulbis | 6 | 3 | 6 | 6

=== Thirteenth qualifier ===
First round
13 | (France) Quentin Halys | 6^{3} | 6 | 3
(Australia) Alex Bolt | 7^{7} | 3 | 6
WC | (United Kingdom) Alexander Ward | 4 | 7 | 6
(Barbados) Darian King | 6 | 5 | 0
(India) Sumit Nagal | 2 | 0
(Poland) Kamil Majchrzak | 6 | 6
(Australia) Thanasi Kokkinakis | 3 | 7^{7} | 6
28 | (El Salvador) Marcelo Arévalo | 6 | 6^{3} | 4

Second round
(Australia) Alex Bolt | 6 | 6
WC | (United Kingdom) Alexander Ward | 2 | 2
(Poland) Kamil Majchrzak | 1 | 4
(Australia) Thanasi Kokkinakis | 6 | 6

Qualifying competition
(Australia) Alex Bolt | 7^{8} | 7^{7} | 4 | 7
(Australia) Thanasi Kokkinakis | 6^{6} | 6^{4} | 6 | 5

=== Fourteenth qualifier ===
First round
14 | (United States) Bjorn Fratangelo | 7^{7} | 6
(Japan) Hiroki Moriya | 6^{5} | 1
WC | (United Kingdom) James Ward | 6 | 7^{7}
(Argentina) Marco Trungelliti | 3 | 6^{0}
(France) Benjamin Bonzi | 4 | 6 | 6
(Japan) Yosuke Watanuki | 6 | 4 | 2
(Slovakia) Andrej Martin | 6 | 2 | 3
32 | (Kazakhstan) Alexander Bublik | 2 | 6 | 6

Second round
14 | (United States) Bjorn Fratangelo | 4 | 4
WC | (United Kingdom) James Ward | 6 | 6
(France) Benjamin Bonzi | 6 | 6
32 | (Kazakhstan) Alexander Bublik | 3 | 4

Qualifying competition
WC | (United Kingdom) James Ward | 4 | 2 | 6 | 0
(France) Benjamin Bonzi | 6 | 6 | 1 | 6

=== Fifteenth qualifier ===
First round
15 | (India) Ramkumar Ramanathan | 3 | 4
(Italy) Simone Bolelli | 6 | 6
(Argentina) Facundo Bagnis | 5 | 2
(Croatia) Viktor Galović | 7 | 6
(United States) Bradley Klahn | 6 | 6
(Spain) Ricardo Ojeda Lara | 3 | 2
(France) Antoine Hoang | 6 | 7
31 | (Norway) Casper Ruud | 4 | 5

Second round
(Italy) Simone Bolelli | 7^{7} | 6
(Croatia) Viktor Galović | 6^{4} | 3
(United States) Bradley Klahn | 6 | 6
(France) Antoine Hoang | 4 | 1

Qualifying competition
(Italy) Simone Bolelli | 3 | 4 | 6^{3}
(United States) Bradley Klahn | 6 | 6 | 7^{7}

=== Sixteenth qualifier ===
First round
16 | (Italy) Thomas Fabbiano | 6 | 6
(Brazil) Guilherme Clezar | 2 | 3
(Germany) Tobias Kamke | 6 | 6
(India) Prajnesh Gunneswaran | 1 | 4
(Chinese Taipei) Jason Jung | 6 | 6
(Serbia) Nikola Milojević | 4 | 0
(Argentina) Renzo Olivo | 4 | 4
22 | (Switzerland) Henri Laaksonen | 6 | 6

Second round
16 | (Italy) Thomas Fabbiano | 6 | 7
(Germany) Tobias Kamke | 1 | 5
(Chinese Taipei) Jason Jung | 7^{9} | 6
22 | (Switzerland) Henri Laaksonen | 6^{7} | 4

Qualifying competition
16 | (Italy) Thomas Fabbiano | 6 | 6 | 3 | 6
(Chinese Taipei) Jason Jung | 4 | 2 | 6 | 3
