= 2018 Wimbledon Championships – Men's doubles =

Men's doubles
- 2018 Wimbledon Championships

Final
- Champions: (United States) Mike Bryan (United States) Jack Sock
- Runners-up: (South Africa) Raven Klaasen (New Zealand) Michael Venus
- Score: 6–3, 6–7^{(7–9)}, 6–3, 5–7, 7–5

Events
Singles	men	women		boys	girls
Doubles	men	women	mixed	boys	girls
WC Singles	men	women	quad
WC Doubles	men	women	quad
Legends	men	women	seniors
- Wimbledon Championships

Łukasz Kubot and Marcelo Melo were the defending champions, but they were defeated in the second round by Jonathan Erlich and Marcin Matkowski.

Mike Bryan and Jack Sock won the title, defeating Raven Klaasen and Michael Venus in the final, 6–3, 6–7^{(7–9)}, 6–3, 5–7, 7–5. It was Bryan's 17th Grand Slam men's doubles title (a new Open Era record), and his first with a partner other than his brother Bob.

Bryan regained the ATP No. 1 doubles ranking at the end of the tournament, becoming the oldest no. 1 player in the history of the ATP rankings. Mate Pavić, John Peers and Nicolas Mahut were also in contention for the top ranking at the start of the tournament.

== Seeds ==
1. (Austria) Oliver Marach / (Croatia) Mate Pavić (first round)
2. (Poland) Łukasz Kubot / (Brazil) Marcelo Melo (second round)
3. (Finland) Henri Kontinen / (Australia) John Peers (first round)
4. (France) Pierre-Hugues Herbert / (France) Nicolas Mahut (second round)
5. (United Kingdom) Jamie Murray / (Brazil) Bruno Soares (quarterfinals)
6. (Colombia) Juan Sebastián Cabal / (Colombia) Robert Farah (third round)
7. (United States) Mike Bryan / (United States) Jack Sock (champions)
8. (Croatia) Nikola Mektić / (Austria) Alexander Peya (third round)

9. (Pakistan) Aisam-ul-Haq Qureshi / (Netherlands) Jean-Julien Rojer (second round)
10. (Croatia) Ivan Dodig / (United States) Rajeev Ram (first round)
11. (Uruguay) Pablo Cuevas / (Spain) Marcel Granollers (second round)
12. (India) Rohan Bopanna / (France) Édouard Roger-Vasselin (second round, retired)
13. (South Africa) Raven Klaasen / (New Zealand) Michael Venus (final)
14. (Japan) Ben McLachlan / (Germany) Jan-Lennard Struff (quarterfinals)
15. (United Kingdom) Dominic Inglot / (Croatia) Franko Škugor (semifinals)
16. (Belarus) Max Mirnyi / (Austria) Philipp Oswald (first round)

Click on the seed number of a player to go to their draw section.

== Draw ==
Key

- Q = Qualifier
- WC = Wild card
- LL = Lucky loser
- Alt = Alternate
- ITF = ITF entry
- PR = Protected ranking
- SR = Special ranking
- SE = Special exempt
- JE = Junior exempt
- JR = Junior Accelerator Programme entrant
- CO = College Accelerator Programme entrant
- NG = Next Gen Accelerator Program entrant
- w/o = Walkover
- r = Retired
- d = Defaulted

=== Finals ===
Quarterfinals
13	(South Africa) Raven Klaasen (New Zealand) Michael Venus	6^{5}	7^{7}	5	7^{7}	6
5	(United Kingdom) Jamie Murray (Brazil) Bruno Soares	7^{7}	6^{5}	7	6^{4}	4
14	(Japan) Ben McLachlan (Germany) Jan-Lennard Struff	6^{6}	6	6^{2}	6^{4}
WC	(Denmark) Frederik Nielsen (United Kingdom) Joe Salisbury	7^{8}	4	7^{7}	7^{7}
(Netherlands) Robin Haase (Sweden) Robert Lindstedt	3	7^{7}	6^{1}	4
15	(United Kingdom) Dominic Inglot (Croatia) Franko Škugor	6	6^{2}	7^{7}	6
7	(United States) Mike Bryan (United States) Jack Sock	7^{7}	7^{7}	6^{3}	6
(India) Divij Sharan (New Zealand) Artem Sitak	6^{4}	6^{5}	7^{7}	4

Semifinals
13	(South Africa) Raven Klaasen (New Zealand) Michael Venus	7^{8}	3	6	6
WC	(Denmark) Frederik Nielsen (United Kingdom) Joe Salisbury	6^{6}	6	3	4
15	(United Kingdom) Dominic Inglot (Croatia) Franko Škugor	3	1	7^{13}	7^{7}	4
7	(United States) Mike Bryan (United States) Jack Sock	6	6	6^{11}	6^{4}	6

Final
13	(South Africa) Raven Klaasen (New Zealand) Michael Venus	3	7^{9}	3	7	5
7	(United States) Mike Bryan (United States) Jack Sock	6	6^{7}	6	5	7

=== Top half ===
==== Section 1 ====
First round
1	(Austria) O Marach (Croatia) M Pavić	6	7^{7}	4	5	2
(Argentina) F Delbonis (Mexico) MÁ Reyes-Varela	4	6^{3}	6	7	6
(Spain) D Marrero (Spain) F Verdasco	6^{6}	4	7^{9}	1
(Argentina) L Mayer (Portugal) J Sousa	7^{8}	6	6^{7}	6
WC	(United Kingdom) J Clarke (United Kingdom) C Norrie	4	7^{7}	7	4	20
(El Salvador) M Arévalo (Chile) H Podlipnik-Castillo	6	6^{5}	5	6	22
WC	(Australia) A Bolt (Australia) L Hewitt	5	2	6	1
13	(South Africa) R Klaasen (New Zealand) M Venus	7	6	3	6
9	(Pakistan) A-u-H Qureshi (Netherlands) J-J Rojer	7^{7}	6	6
(Spain) D Ferrer (Spain) M López	6^{3}	4	4
(United Kingdom) K Skupski (United Kingdom) N Skupski	6	6	6
PR	(Serbia) I Bozoljac (Bosnia and Herzegovina) D Džumhur	3	4	4
(Australia) M Ebden (United States) T Fritz	6	6	6
(Germany) P Gojowczyk (France) B Paire	3	4	3
(Italy) P Lorenzi (Spain) A Ramos Viñolas	5	2	1
5	(United Kingdom) J Murray (Brazil) B Soares	7	6	6

Second round
(Argentina) F Delbonis (Mexico) MÁ Reyes-Varela	1	6^{1}	4
(Argentina) L Mayer (Portugal) J Sousa	6	7^{7}	6
(El Salvador) M Arévalo (Chile) H Podlipnik-Castillo	4	3	4
13	(South Africa) R Klaasen (New Zealand) M Venus	6	6	6
9	(Pakistan) A-u-H Qureshi (Netherlands) J-J Rojer	4	4	6^{2}
(United Kingdom) K Skupski (United Kingdom) N Skupski	6	6	7^{7}
(Australia) M Ebden (United States) T Fritz	5	3	1
5	(United Kingdom) J Murray (Brazil) B Soares	7	6	6

Third round
(Argentina) L Mayer (Portugal) J Sousa	3	6^{5}	7^{7}	7^{7}	3
13	(South Africa) R Klaasen (New Zealand) M Venus	6	7^{7}	6^{5}	6^{3}	6
(United Kingdom) K Skupski (United Kingdom) N Skupski	3	4	4
5	(United Kingdom) J Murray (Brazil) B Soares	6	6	6

Quarterfinals
13	(South Africa) R Klaasen (New Zealand) M Venus	6^{5}	7^{7}	5	7^{7}	6
5	(United Kingdom) J Murray (Brazil) B Soares	7^{7}	6^{5}	7	6^{4}	4

==== Section 2 ====
First round
4	(France) P-H Herbert (France) N Mahut	6	6	6
(Spain) R Carballés Baena (Italy) M Cecchinato	4	2	4
(United States) R Harrison (Canada) V Pospisil	4	6^{8}	2
(Germany) P Petzschner (Germany) T Pütz	6	7^{10}	6
Q	(India) S Balaji (India) V Vardhan	7^{7}	6	7^{7}
(New Zealand) M Daniell (Netherlands) W Koolhof	6^{5}	4	6^{4}
(United States) N Monroe (Australia) J-P Smith	4	5	4
14	(Japan) B McLachlan (Germany) J-L Struff	6	7	6
12	(India) R Bopanna (France) É Roger-Vasselin	6	6	6
(Australia) A de Minaur (Australia) J Millman	2	2	4
(France) J Benneteau (France) A Mannarino	4	0^{r}
WC	(Denmark) F Nielsen (United Kingdom) J Salisbury	6	1
(Italy) M Berrettini (Germany) M Marterer	4	4	6	3
(Czech Republic) R Jebavý (Argentina) A Molteni	6	6	3	6
(Spain) P Carreño Busta (Spain) G García López	4	6^{10}	6	1
6	(Colombia) JS Cabal (Colombia) R Farah	6	7^{12}	2	6

Second round
4	(France) P-H Herbert (France) N Mahut	4	7^{7}	6^{4}	3
(Germany) P Petzschner (Germany) T Pütz	6	6^{3}	7^{7}	6
Q	(India) S Balaji (India) V Vardhan	6^{2}	7^{7}	6^{3}	3
14	(Japan) B McLachlan (Germany) J-L Struff	7^{7}	6^{3}	7^{7}	6
12	(India) R Bopanna (France) É Roger-Vasselin	4	6^{4}	1^{r}
WC	(Denmark) F Nielsen (United Kingdom) J Salisbury	6	7^{7}	2
(Czech Republic) R Jebavý (Argentina) A Molteni	2	4	6	0
6	(Colombia) JS Cabal (Colombia) R Farah	6	6	3	6

Third round
(Germany) P Petzschner (Germany) T Pütz	3	4	6^{3}
14	(Japan) B McLachlan (Germany) J-L Struff	6	6	7^{7}
WC	(Denmark) F Nielsen (United Kingdom) J Salisbury	5	7^{7}	6	7^{7}
6	(Colombia) JS Cabal (Colombia) R Farah	7	6^{3}	3	6^{1}

Quarterfinals
14	(Japan) B McLachlan (Germany) J-L Struff	6^{6}	6	6^{2}	6^{4}
WC	(Denmark) F Nielsen (United Kingdom) J Salisbury	7^{8}	4	7^{7}	7^{7}

=== Bottom half ===
==== Section 3 ====
First round
8	(Croatia) N Mektić (Austria) A Peya	6	6	6
WC	(Austria) J Melzer (Canada) D Nestor	3	4	4
(Bosnia and Herzegovina) M Bašić (Serbia) D Lajović	6	6	6^{5}	4	11
(France) F Martin (India) P Raja	2	4	7^{7}	6	9
PR	(Japan) T Daniel (Japan) Y Nishioka	3	4	4
(Croatia) A Šančić (Belarus) A Vasilevski	6	6	6
(Netherlands) R Haase (Sweden) R Lindstedt	7^{7}	7	6
10	(Croatia) I Dodig (United States) R Ram	6^{4}	5	3
15	(United Kingdom) D Inglot (Croatia) F Škugor	6	7	6
(Hungary) M Fucsovics (Germany) M Zverev	4	5	2
(Romania) M Copil (Greece) S Tsitsipas	4	4	2
(Brazil) M Demoliner (Mexico) S González	6	6	6
WC	(United Kingdom) L Broady (United Kingdom) S Clayton	7	6	7
(United States) F Tiafoe (United States) J Withrow	5	3	5
(Argentina) M González (Chile) N Jarry	6	6	3	4	8
3	(Finland) H Kontinen (Australia) J Peers	4	4	6	6	6

Second round
8	(Croatia) N Mektić (Austria) A Peya	6^{1}	7^{7}	2	6	6
(Bosnia and Herzegovina) M Bašić (Serbia) D Lajović	7^{7}	6^{3}	6	3	4
(Croatia) A Šančić (Belarus) A Vasilevski	6^{4}	1	6^{3}
(Netherlands) R Haase (Sweden) R Lindstedt	7^{7}	6	7^{7}
15	(United Kingdom) D Inglot (Croatia) F Škugor	6	4	7^{7}	2	6
(Brazil) M Demoliner (Mexico) S González	3	6	6^{5}	6	2
WC	(United Kingdom) L Broady (United Kingdom) S Clayton	6^{4}	3	2^{r}
(Argentina) M González (Chile) N Jarry	7^{7}	6	1

Third round
8	(Croatia) N Mektić (Austria) A Peya	5	3	6	6	6
(Netherlands) R Haase (Sweden) R Lindstedt	7	6	3	4	8
15	(United Kingdom) D Inglot (Croatia) F Škugor	4	7^{7}	7^{8}	6
(Argentina) M González (Chile) N Jarry	6	6^{5}	6^{6}	3

Quarterfinals
(Netherlands) R Haase (Sweden) R Lindstedt	3	7^{7}	6^{1}	4
15	(United Kingdom) D Inglot (Croatia) F Škugor	6	6^{2}	7^{7}	6

==== Section 4 ====
First round
7	(United States) M Bryan (United States) J Sock	6	2
PR	(Italy) D Bracciali (Italy) A Seppi	3	0^{r}
(Netherlands) S Arends (Netherlands) M Middelkoop	7^{7}	7^{7}	7^{7}
Q	(United States) A Krajicek (India) J Nedunchezhiyan	6^{5}	6^{3}	6^{2}
(Monaco) R Arneodo (United States) J Cerretani	3	6^{4}	6	3
Q	(Germany) K Krawietz (Germany) A Mies	6	7^{7}	4	6
Q	(Germany) A Begemann (Japan) Y Uchiyama	2	4	6	6^{7}
11	(Uruguay) P Cuevas (Spain) M Granollers	6	6	3	7^{9}
16	(Belarus) M Mirnyi (Austria) P Oswald	1	7^{7}	2	6^{1}
(Chile) J Peralta (Argentina) H Zeballos	6	6^{5}	6	7^{7}
(India) D Sharan (New Zealand) A Sitak	7^{7}	6^{8}	6	6
(Moldova) R Albot (Tunisia) M Jaziri	6^{4}	7^{10}	3	2
(Israel) J Erlich (Poland) M Matkowski	7^{7}	7^{7}	7^{10}
(France) J Eysseric (France) H Nys	6^{5}	6^{4}	6^{8}
WC	(United Kingdom) L Bambridge (United Kingdom) J O'Mara	4	3	5
2	(Poland) Ł Kubot (Brazil) M Melo	6	6	7

Second round
7	(United States) M Bryan (United States) J Sock	6^{2}	6	7^{7}	7^{7}
(Netherlands) S Arends (Netherlands) M Middelkoop	7^{7}	1	6^{3}	6^{4}
Q	(Germany) K Krawietz (Germany) A Mies	6	6	7^{7}
11	(Uruguay) P Cuevas (Spain) M Granollers	3	4	6^{3}
(Chile) J Peralta (Argentina) H Zeballos	7^{7}	6	3	6^{5}	4
(India) D Sharan (New Zealand) A Sitak	6^{5}	4	6	7^{7}	6
(Israel) J Erlich (Poland) M Matkowski	6^{5}	6	7^{7}	7^{10}
2	(Poland) Ł Kubot (Brazil) M Melo	7^{7}	4	6^{4}	6^{8}

Third round
7	(United States) M Bryan (United States) J Sock	6	6^{2}	6	6^{5}	7
Q	(Germany) K Krawietz (Germany) A Mies	2	7^{7}	4	7^{7}	5
(India) D Sharan (New Zealand) A Sitak	1	6^{3}	6	6	6
(Israel) J Erlich (Poland) M Matkowski	6	7^{7}	4	4	4

Quarterfinals
7	(United States) M Bryan (United States) J Sock	7^{7}	7^{7}	6^{3}	6
(India) D Sharan (New Zealand) A Sitak	6^{4}	6^{5}	7^{7}	4
