= 2018 Wimbledon Championships – Women's singles =

Women's singles
- 2018 Wimbledon Championships

Final
- Champion: (Germany) Angelique Kerber
- Runner-up: (United States) Serena Williams
- Score: 6–3, 6–3

Details
- Draw: 128 (12Q / 8WC)
- Seeds: 32

Events
Singles	men	women		boys	girls
Doubles	men	women	mixed	boys	girls
WC Singles	men	women	quad
WC Doubles	men	women	quad
Legends	men	women	seniors
- Wimbledon Championships

Angelique Kerber defeated Serena Williams in the final, 6–3, 6–3 to win the ladies' singles tennis title at the 2018 Wimbledon Championships. It was her third and last major title. Kerber was the first German to win the title since Steffi Graf in 1996.

Garbiñe Muguruza was the defending champion, but lost in the second round to Alison Van Uytvanck.

Simona Halep, Caroline Wozniacki and Sloane Stephens were in contention for the world No. 1 singles ranking. Despite losing in the third round, Halep retained the No. 1 ranking after Wozniacki and Stephens lost in the second and first rounds, respectively.

Serena Williams is the second player to be seeded at a major while also using a protected ranking to enter the tournament, following Williams herself in the 2011 US Open.

With all of the top ten seeds losing before the quarterfinals, it was the worst overall Wimbledon performance of the top ten women's seeds in the Open Era. This was also the first time in the Open Era that none of the top four women's singles seeds reached the fourth round at Wimbledon.

== Seeds ==
1. (Romania) Simona Halep (third round)
2. (Denmark) Caroline Wozniacki (second round)
3. (Spain) Garbiñe Muguruza (second round)
4. (United States) Sloane Stephens (first round)
5. (Ukraine) Elina Svitolina (first round)
6. (France) Caroline Garcia (first round)
7. (Czech Republic) Karolína Plíšková (fourth round)
8. (Czech Republic) Petra Kvitová (first round)
9. (United States) Venus Williams (third round)
10. (United States) Madison Keys (third round)
11. (Germany) Angelique Kerber (champion)
12. (Latvia) Jeļena Ostapenko (semifinals)
13. (Germany) Julia Görges (semifinals)
14. (Russia) Daria Kasatkina (quarterfinals)
15. (Belgium) Elise Mertens (third round)
16. (United States) CoCo Vandeweghe (first round)

17. (Australia) Ashleigh Barty (third round)
18. (Japan) Naomi Osaka (third round)
19. (Slovakia) Magdaléna Rybáriková (first round)
20. (Netherlands) Kiki Bertens (quarterfinals)
21. (Latvia) Anastasija Sevastova (first round)
22. (United Kingdom) Johanna Konta (second round)
23. (Czech Republic) Barbora Strýcová (third round)
24. (Russia) Maria Sharapova (first round)
25. (United States) Serena Williams (final)
26. (Australia) Daria Gavrilova (third round)
27. (Spain) Carla Suárez Navarro (third round)
28. (Estonia) Anett Kontaveit (third round)
29. (Romania) Mihaela Buzărnescu (third round)
30. (Russia) Anastasia Pavlyuchenkova (first round)
31. (China) Zhang Shuai (first round)
32. (Poland) Agnieszka Radwańska (second round)

Click on the seed number of a player to go to their draw section.

== Draw ==
Key

- Q = Qualifier
- WC = Wild card
- LL = Lucky loser
- Alt = Alternate
- ITF = ITF entry
- PR = Protected ranking
- SR = Special ranking
- SE = Special exempt
- JE = Junior exempt
- JR = Junior Accelerator Programme entrant
- CO = College Accelerator Programme entrant
- NG = Next Gen Accelerator Program entrant
- w/o = Walkover
- r = Retired
- d = Defaulted

=== Finals ===
Quarterfinals
(Slovakia) Dominika Cibulková	5	4
12	(Latvia) Jeļena Ostapenko	7	6
14	(Russia) Daria Kasatkina	3	5
11	(Germany) Angelique Kerber	6	7
20	(Netherlands) Kiki Bertens	6	5	1
13	(Germany) Julia Görges	3	7	6
25/PR	(United States) Serena Williams	3	6	6
(Italy) Camila Giorgi	6	3	4

Semifinals
12	(Latvia) Jeļena Ostapenko	3	3
11	(Germany) Angelique Kerber	6	6
13	(Germany) Julia Görges	2	4
25/PR	(United States) Serena Williams	6	6

Final
11	(Germany) Angelique Kerber	6	6
25/PR	(United States) Serena Williams	3	3

=== Top half ===
==== Section 1 ====
First round
1	(Romania) S Halep	6	6
(Japan) K Nara	2	4
PR	(China) S Zheng	6	4	6
(China) Q Wang	3	6	1
(Romania) A Bogdan	1	6	6
(Spain) L Arruabarrena	6	3	8
(Chinese Taipei) S-w Hsieh	6	4	6
30	(Russia) A Pavlyuchenkova	4	6	3
22	(United Kingdom) J Konta	7	7^{9}
(Russia) N Vikhlyantseva	5	6^{7}
(France) A Cornet	6^{3}	1
(Slovakia) D Cibulková	7^{7}	6
(Czech Republic) M Vondroušová	1	2
(United States) S Vickery	6	6
(United States) D Collins	3	2
15	(Belgium) E Mertens	6	6

Second round
1	(Romania) S Halep	7	6
PR	(China) S Zheng	5	0
(Spain) L Arruabarrena	3	3
(Chinese Taipei) S-w Hsieh	6	6
22	(United Kingdom) J Konta	3	4
(Slovakia) D Cibulková	6	6
(United States) S Vickery	1	3
15	(Belgium) E Mertens	6	6

Third round
1	(Romania) S Halep	6	4	5
(Chinese Taipei) S-w Hsieh	3	6	7
(Slovakia) D Cibulková	6	6
15	(Belgium) E Mertens	2	2

Fourth round
(Chinese Taipei) S-w Hsieh	4	1
(Slovakia) D Cibulková	6	6

==== Section 2 ====
First round
12	(Latvia) J Ostapenko	6	7^{7}
WC	(United Kingdom) K Dunne	3	6^{5}
(United Kingdom) H Watson	4	5
(Belgium) K Flipkens	6	7
(United States) S Kenin	6	1	6
(Greece) M Sakkari	4	6	1
Q	(Russia) V Diatchenko	6^{3}	7^{7}	6
24	(Russia) M Sharapova	7^{7}	6^{3}	4
26	(Australia) D Gavrilova	6	6
LL	(United States) C Dolehide	2	3
(China) S Peng	4	5
(Australia) S Stosur	6	7
(France) P Parmentier	2	4
(United States) T Townsend	6	6
(Belarus) A Sasnovich	6	4	6
8	(Czech Republic) P Kvitová	4	6	0

Second round
12	(Latvia) J Ostapenko	6	6
(Belgium) K Flipkens	1	3
(United States) S Kenin	4	1
Q	(Russia) V Diatchenko	6	6
26	(Australia) D Gavrilova	6	6
(Australia) S Stosur	4	1
(United States) T Townsend	0	4
(Belarus) A Sasnovich	6	6

Third round
12	(Latvia) J Ostapenko	6	6
Q	(Russia) V Diatchenko	0	4
26	(Australia) D Gavrilova	3	1
(Belarus) A Sasnovich	6	6

Fourth round
12	(Latvia) J Ostapenko	7^{7}	6
(Belarus) A Sasnovich	6^{4}	0

==== Section 3 ====
First round
3	(Spain) G Muguruza	6	7
WC	(United Kingdom) N Broady	2	5
(Belgium) A Van Uytvanck	6	6
(Slovenia) P Hercog	2	2
(United States) J Brady	6	6^{4}	6
(Ukraine) K Kozlova	2	7^{7}	2
(Czech Republic) D Allertová	2	2
28	(Estonia) A Kontaveit	6	6
17	(Australia) A Barty	7	6
(Switzerland) S Vögele	5	3
WC	(United Kingdom) G Taylor	0	6	3
Q	(Canada) E Bouchard	6	4	6
(Poland) M Linette	3	6	8
(Kazakhstan) Y Putintseva	6	3	10
(Croatia) J Fett	2	5
14	(Russia) D Kasatkina	6	7

Second round
3	(Spain) G Muguruza	7	2	1
(Belgium) A Van Uytvanck	5	6	6
(United States) J Brady	2	6^{4}
28	(Estonia) A Kontaveit	6	7^{7}
17	(Australia) A Barty	6	7
Q	(Canada) E Bouchard	4	5
(Kazakhstan) Y Putintseva	2	3
14	(Russia) D Kasatkina	6	6

Third round
(Belgium) A Van Uytvanck	6	6
28	(Estonia) A Kontaveit	2	3
17	(Australia) A Barty	5	3
14	(Russia) D Kasatkina	7	6

Fourth round
(Belgium) A Van Uytvanck	7^{8}	3	2
14	(Russia) D Kasatkina	6^{6}	6	6

==== Section 4 ====
First round
11	(Germany) A Kerber	7	6
Q	(Russia) V Zvonareva	5	3
(Croatia) A Konjuh	2	7^{7}	3
Q	(United States) C Liu	6	6^{2}	6
WC	(United Kingdom) K Boulter	6	5	6
(Paraguay) V Cepede Royg	4	7	4
(Romania) M Niculescu	4	1
18	(Japan) N Osaka	6	6
27	(Spain) C Suárez Navarro	6	6
(Germany) C Witthöft	2	4
Q	(Spain) S Sorribes Tormo	7^{7}	6
(Estonia) K Kanepi	6^{5}	1
(United States) A Riske	6	6
LL	(Colombia) M Duque Mariño	1	1
(Switzerland) B Bencic	7^{7}	6
6	(France) C Garcia	6^{2}	3

Second round
11	(Germany) A Kerber	3	6	6
Q	(United States) C Liu	6	2	4
WC	(United Kingdom) K Boulter	3	4
18	(Japan) N Osaka	6	6
27	(Spain) C Suárez Navarro	6	6
Q	(Spain) S Sorribes Tormo	4	1
(United States) A Riske	6	6^{10}	2
(Switzerland) B Bencic	1	7^{12}	6

Third round
11	(Germany) A Kerber	6	6
18	(Japan) N Osaka	2	4
27	(Spain) C Suárez Navarro	1	6^{3}
(Switzerland) B Bencic	6	7^{7}

Fourth round
11	(Germany) A Kerber	6	7^{7}
(Switzerland) B Bencic	3	6^{5}

=== Bottom half ===
==== Section 5 ====
First round
7	(Czech Republic) Ka Plíšková	7^{7}	2	6
WC	(United Kingdom) H Dart	6^{2}	6	1
(Russia) E Alexandrova	6^{4}	3
(Belarus) V Azarenka	7^{7}	6
(Romania) I-C Begu	2	2
WC	(United Kingdom) K Swan	6	6
(Belarus) A Sabalenka	7^{7}	1	4
29	(Romania) M Buzărnescu	6^{3}	6	6
20	(Netherlands) K Bertens	6	6
Q	(Czech Republic) B Štefková	3	2
(China) Y Wang	7^{7}	4	4
(Russia) A Blinkova	6^{4}	6	6
Q	(Romania) A Dulgheru	6	1	6
(Czech Republic) Kr Plíšková	4	6	2
(Sweden) J Larsson	7^{7}	2	1
9	(United States) V Williams	6^{3}	6	6

Second round
7	(Czech Republic) Ka Plíšková	6	6
(Belarus) V Azarenka	3	3
WC	(United Kingdom) K Swan	0	3
29	(Romania) M Buzărnescu	6	6
20	(Netherlands) K Bertens	6	6
(Russia) A Blinkova	4	0
Q	(Romania) A Dulgheru	6	0	1
9	(United States) V Williams	4	6	6

Third round
7	(Czech Republic) Ka Plíšková	3	7^{7}	6
29	(Romania) M Buzărnescu	6	6^{3}	1
20	(Netherlands) K Bertens	6	6^{5}	8
9	(United States) V Williams	2	7^{7}	6

Fourth round
7	(Czech Republic) Ka Plíšková	3	6^{1}
20	(Netherlands) K Bertens	6	7^{7}

==== Section 6 ====
First round
13	(Germany) J Görges	6	7^{9}
(Puerto Rico) M Puig	4	6^{7}
(Belarus) V Lapko	5	7	7
(United States) C McHale	7	5	5
(Ukraine) L Tsurenko	7	6
(Hungary) T Babos	5	2
(Russia) S Kuznetsova	6^{6}	5
23	(Czech Republic) B Strýcová	7^{8}	7
31	(China) S Zhang	4	6	2
(Germany) A Petkovic	6	4	6
Q	(Germany) M Barthel	5	4
(Belgium) Y Wickmayer	7	6
(Slovakia) V Kužmová	6^{3}	6^{9}
(Sweden) R Peterson	7^{7}	7^{11}
(Croatia) D Vekić	6	6
4	(United States) S Stephens	1	3

Second round
13	(Germany) J Görges	6	3	6
(Belarus) V Lapko	2	6	2
(Ukraine) L Tsurenko	1	4
23	(Czech Republic) B Strýcová	6	6
(Germany) A Petkovic	4	3
(Belgium) Y Wickmayer	6	6
(Sweden) R Peterson	5	4
(Croatia) D Vekić	7	6

Third round
13	(Germany) J Görges	7^{7}	3	10
23	(Czech Republic) B Strýcová	6^{3}	6	8
(Belgium) Y Wickmayer	6^{2}	1
(Croatia) D Vekić	7^{7}	6

Fourth round
13	(Germany) J Görges	6	6
(Croatia) D Vekić	3	2

==== Section 7 ====
First round
5	(Ukraine) E Svitolina	6^{3}	6	1
(Germany) T Maria	7^{7}	4	6
(Slovakia) AK Schmiedlová	7	2	2
(France) K Mladenovic	5	6	6
WC	(Czech Republic) T Smitková	6^{3}	1
Q	(Bulgaria) V Tomova	7^{7}	6
(Netherlands) A Rus	5	3
25/PR	(United States) S Williams	7	6
19	(Slovakia) M Rybáriková	5	3
(Romania) S Cîrstea	7	6
Q	(Russia) E Rodina	3	7	6
Q	(Germany) A Lottner	6	5	4
(Thailand) L Kumkhum	4	6	6
(United States) B Pera	6	2	3
(Australia) A Tomljanović	4	2
10	(United States) M Keys	6	6

Second round
(Germany) T Maria	2	2
(France) K Mladenovic	6	6
Q	(Bulgaria) V Tomova	1	4
25/PR	(United States) S Williams	6	6
(Romania) S Cîrstea	6	3	3
Q	(Russia) E Rodina	1	6	6
(Thailand) L Kumkhum	4	3
10	(United States) M Keys	6	6

Third round
(France) K Mladenovic	5	6^{2}
25/PR	(United States) S Williams	7	7^{7}
Q	(Russia) E Rodina	7	5	6
10	(United States) M Keys	5	7	4

Fourth round
25/PR	(United States) S Williams	6	6
Q	(Russia) E Rodina	2	2

==== Section 8 ====
First round
16	(United States) C Vandeweghe	7^{7}	3	6
(Czech Republic) K Siniaková	6^{3}	6	8
(Switzerland) V Golubic	6	3	3
WC	(Tunisia) O Jabeur	2	6	6
(Serbia) A Krunić	6	3	3
(United States) M Brengle	2	6	6
(Italy) C Giorgi	6	2	6
21	(Latvia) A Sevastova	1	6	4
32	(Poland) A Radwańska	6	4	7
Q	(Romania) E-G Ruse	3	6	5
(Ukraine) K Bondarenko	4	4
(Czech Republic) L Šafářová	6	6
(Croatia) P Martić	6^{0}	6	3
(Russia) E Makarova	7^{7}	2	6
(United States) V Lepchenko	0	3
2	(Denmark) C Wozniacki	6	6

Second round
(Czech Republic) K Siniaková	5	6	9
WC	(Tunisia) O Jabeur	7	4	7
(United States) M Brengle	4	4
(Italy) C Giorgi	6	6
32	(Poland) A Radwańska	5	4
(Czech Republic) L Šafářová	7	6
(Russia) E Makarova	6	1	7
2	(Denmark) C Wozniacki	4	6	5

Third round
(Czech Republic) K Siniaková	6	6^{6}	2
(Italy) C Giorgi	3	7^{8}	6
(Czech Republic) L Šafářová	6	4	1
(Russia) E Makarova	4	6	6

Fourth round
(Italy) C Giorgi	6	6
(Russia) E Makarova	3	4

== Championship match statistics ==
Category	(Germany) Kerber	(United States) S. Williams
1st serve %	33/50 (66%)	38/51 (75%)
1st serve points won	23 of 33 = 70%	24 of 38 = 63%
2nd serve points won	10 of 17 = 59%	4 of 13 = 31%
Total service points won	33 of 50 = 66.00%	28 of 51 = 54.90%
Aces	1	4
Double faults	1	2
Winners	11	23
Unforced errors	5	24
Net points won	2 of 6 = 33%	12 of 24 = 50%
Break points converted	4 of 7 = 57%	1 of 1 = 100%
Return points won	23 of 51 = 45%	17 of 50 = 34%
Total points won	56	45

Preceded by 2018 French Open – Women's singles	Grand Slam women's singles	Succeeded by 2018 US Open – Women's singles
