= 2018 Wimbledon Championships – Women's doubles =

Women's doubles
- 2018 Wimbledon Championships

Final
- Champions: (Czech Republic) Barbora Krejčíková (Czech Republic) Kateřina Siniaková
- Runners-up: (United States) Nicole Melichar (Czech Republic) Květa Peschke
- Score: 6–4, 4–6, 6–0

Details
- Draw: 64 (4 Q / 3 WC / 3 LL )
- Seeds: 16

Events
Singles	men	women		boys	girls
Doubles	men	women	mixed	boys	girls
WC Singles	men	women	quad
WC Doubles	men	women	quad
Legends	men	women	seniors
← 2017 ·	Wimbledon Championships	· 2019 →

Barbora Krejčíková and Kateřina Siniaková defeated Nicole Melichar and Květa Peschke in the final, 6–4, 4–6, 6–0 to win the ladies' doubles tennis title at the 2018 Wimbledon Championships. They became the first team to win the Channel Slam (the French Open and Wimbledon titles in the same season) since Kim Clijsters and Ai Sugiyama in 2003, and the first team to win both the Wimbledon junior and senior doubles titles together (achieving the former in 2013).

Ekaterina Makarova and Elena Vesnina were the reigning champions, but Vesnina was unable to compete due to an injury. Makarova partnered Vera Zvonareva, but was defeated in the second round by Elise Mertens and Demi Schuurs.

Tímea Babos attained the WTA no. 1 doubles ranking at the end of the tournament. Makarova, Andrea Sestini Hlaváčková and Latisha Chan were also in contention for the top ranking.

Bethanie Mattek-Sands and Samantha Stosur were each bidding to complete the career Grand Slam, but Mattek-Sands was defeated in the quarterfinals and Stosur was defeated in the first round.

== Seeds ==
1. (Hungary) Tímea Babos / (France) Kristina Mladenovic (quarterfinals)
2. (Czech Republic) Andrea Sestini Hlaváčková / (Czech Republic) Barbora Strýcová (third round)
3. (Czech Republic) Barbora Krejčíková / (Czech Republic) Kateřina Siniaková (champions)
4. (Slovenia) Andreja Klepač / (Spain) María José Martínez Sánchez (third round)
5. (Chinese Taipei) Latisha Chan / (China) Peng Shuai (second round)
6. (Canada) Gabriela Dabrowski / (China) Xu Yifan (semifinals)
7. (Chinese Taipei) Chan Hao-ching / (China) Yang Zhaoxuan (second round)
8. (Belgium) Elise Mertens / (Netherlands) Demi Schuurs (third round)
9. (Netherlands) Kiki Bertens / (Sweden) Johanna Larsson (third round)
10. (Australia) Ashleigh Barty / (United States) CoCo Vandeweghe (withdrew)
11. (United States) Raquel Atawo / (Germany) Anna-Lena Grönefeld (second round)
12. (United States) Nicole Melichar / (Czech Republic) Květa Peschke (final)
13. (Belgium) Kirsten Flipkens / (Romania) Monica Niculescu (third round)
14. (Czech Republic) Lucie Hradecká / (Chinese Taipei) Hsieh Su-wei (third round)
15. (Romania) Irina-Camelia Begu / (Romania) Mihaela Buzărnescu (quarterfinals)
16. (Ukraine) Lyudmyla Kichenok / (Russia) Alla Kudryavtseva (first round)
17. (United States) Vania King / (Slovenia) Katarina Srebotnik (third round)

Click on the seed number of a player to go to their draw section.

== Draw ==
=== Key ===
- Q = Qualifier
- WC = Wild card
- LL = Lucky loser
- Alt = Alternate
- ITF = ITF entry
- PR = Protected ranking
- SR = Special ranking
- SE = Special exempt
- JE = Junior exempt
- JR = Junior Accelerator Programme entrant
- CO = College Accelerator Programme entrant
- NG = Next Gen Accelerator Program entrant
- w/o = Walkover
- r = Retired
- d = Defaulted

=== Finals ===
Quarterfinals
1	(Hungary) Tímea Babos (France) Kristina Mladenovic	6^{4}	3
(Poland) Alicja Rosolska (United States) Abigail Spears	7^{7}	6
3	(Czech Republic) Barbora Krejčíková (Czech Republic) Kateřina Siniaková	3	7^{7}	6
(Germany) Tatjana Maria (United Kingdom) Heather Watson	6	6^{5}	4
12	(United States) Nicole Melichar (Czech Republic) Květa Peschke	5	6	6
15	(Romania) Irina-Camelia Begu (Romania) Mihaela Buzărnescu	7	4	4
6	(Canada) Gabriela Dabrowski (China) Xu Yifan	5	6	6
(United States) Bethanie Mattek-Sands (Czech Republic) Lucie Šafářová	7	4	2

Semifinals
(Poland) Alicja Rosolska (United States) Abigail Spears	5	4
3	(Czech Republic) Barbora Krejčíková (Czech Republic) Kateřina Siniaková	7	6
12	(United States) Nicole Melichar (Czech Republic) Květa Peschke	6	4	7
6	(Canada) Gabriela Dabrowski (China) Xu Yifan	3	6	5

Final
3	(Czech Republic) Barbora Krejčíková (Czech Republic) Kateřina Siniaková	6	4	6
12	(United States) Nicole Melichar (Czech Republic) Květa Peschke	4	6	0

=== Top half ===
==== Section 1 ====
First round
1	(Hungary) T Babos (France) K Mladenovic	6	6
(Japan) E Hozumi (Japan) M Kato	4	3
(Russia) A Pavlyuchenkova (Australia) S Stosur	2	4
(Ukraine) N Kichenok (Australia) An Rodionova	6	6
(United States) S Kenin (United States) S Vickery	6	7^{7}
LL	(Germany) N Geuer (Switzerland) V Golubic	4	6^{1}
(Kazakhstan) Y Putintseva (Australia) A Tomljanović	4	5
13	(Belgium) K Flipkens (Romania) M Niculescu	6	7
9	(Netherlands) K Bertens (Sweden) J Larsson	6	6
(Australia) M Adamczak (Czech Republic) R Voráčová	2	3
(Georgia (country)) O Kalashnikova (Japan) M Ninomiya	4	2
Q	(Australia) Ar Rodionova (Belgium) M Zanevska	6	6
PR	(Czech Republic) E Hrdinová (Mexico) G Olmos	1	4
(Poland) A Rosolska (United States) A Spears	6	6
(Romania) R Olaru (China) Y Wang	5	3
5	(Chinese Taipei) L Chan (China) S Peng	7	6

Second round
1	(Hungary) T Babos (France) K Mladenovic	6	6
(Ukraine) N Kichenok (Australia) An Rodionova	3	2
(United States) S Kenin (United States) S Vickery	2	6	4
13	(Belgium) K Flipkens (Romania) M Niculescu	6	1	6
9	(Netherlands) K Bertens (Sweden) J Larsson	2	7^{7}	6
Q	(Australia) Ar Rodionova (Belgium) M Zanevska	6	6^{2}	2
(Poland) A Rosolska (United States) A Spears	6	6
5	(Chinese Taipei) L Chan (China) S Peng	4	4

Third round
1	(Hungary) T Babos (France) K Mladenovic	6	6
13	(Belgium) K Flipkens (Romania) M Niculescu	3	4
9	(Netherlands) K Bertens (Sweden) J Larsson	6	6^{5}	3
(Poland) A Rosolska (United States) A Spears	3	7^{7}	6

Quarterfinals
1	(Hungary) T Babos (France) K Mladenovic	6^{4}	3
(Poland) A Rosolska (United States) A Spears	7^{7}	6

==== Section 2 ====
First round
3	(Czech Republic) B Krejčíková (Czech Republic) K Siniaková	6	2	6
Q	(Chile) A Guarachi (New Zealand) E Routliffe	2	6	2
(Switzerland) B Bencic (Ukraine) K Kozlova	3	4
PR	(Spain) L Arruabarrena (Spain) A Parra Santonja	6	6
(Russia) V Kudermetova (Belarus) A Sabalenka	5	6	6
(United States) D Collins (Australia) J Moore	7	4	2
WC	(United Kingdom) K Boulter (United Kingdom) K Swan	3	2
14	(Czech Republic) L Hradecká (Chinese Taipei) S-w Hsieh	6	6
11	(United States) R Atawo (Germany) A-L Grönefeld	4	6	6
(Switzerland) X Knoll (United Kingdom) A Smith	6	3	3
(China) C Liang (China) S Zhang	2	2
(Germany) T Maria (United Kingdom) H Watson	6	6
(United States) C McHale (Latvia) J Ostapenko	7	7^{7}
WC	(United Kingdom) N Broady (United States) A Muhammad	5	6^{3}
Q	(Belgium) Y Bonaventure (Netherlands) B Schoofs	4	1
7	(Chinese Taipei) H-c Chan (China) Z Yang	6	6

Second round
3	(Czech Republic) B Krejčíková (Czech Republic) K Siniaková	4	6	6
PR	(Spain) L Arruabarrena (Spain) A Parra Santonja	6	4	4
(Russia) V Kudermetova (Belarus) A Sabalenka	6	4	3
14	(Czech Republic) L Hradecká (Chinese Taipei) S-w Hsieh	4	6	6
11	(United States) R Atawo (Germany) A-L Grönefeld	3	1
(Germany) T Maria (United Kingdom) H Watson	6	6
(United States) C McHale (Latvia) J Ostapenko	6	6
7	(Chinese Taipei) H-c Chan (China) Z Yang	3	2

Third round
3	(Czech Republic) B Krejčíková (Czech Republic) K Siniaková	6	6
14	(Czech Republic) L Hradecká (Chinese Taipei) S-w Hsieh	4	3
(Germany) T Maria (United Kingdom) H Watson	w/o
(United States) C McHale (Latvia) J Ostapenko

Quarterfinals
3	(Czech Republic) B Krejčíková (Czech Republic) K Siniaková	3	7^{7}	6
(Germany) T Maria (United Kingdom) H Watson	6	6^{5}	4

=== Bottom half ===
==== Section 3 ====
First round
8	(Belgium) E Mertens (Netherlands) D Schuurs	7	6
(Romania) S Cîrstea (Spain) S Sorribes Tormo	5	4
(Russia) E Makarova (Russia) V Zvonareva	6	6
LL	(Russia) A Blinkova (Czech Republic) M Vondroušová	3	4
PR	(Luxembourg) M Minella (Latvia) A Sevastova	1	2
LL	(Spain) G García Pérez (Hungary) F Stollár	6	6
(Estonia) A Kontaveit (Puerto Rico) M Puig	4	2
12	(United States) N Melichar (Czech Republic) K Peschke	6	6
15	(Romania) I-C Begu (Romania) M Buzărnescu	6	7^{7}
(Australia) D Gavrilova (Belarus) V Lapko	3	6^{3}
(Romania) A Bogdan (United States) K Christian	6	6
(China) Y Duan (Belarus) A Sasnovich	3	4
(Croatia) P Martić (Slovakia) M Rybáriková	7	6
(Netherlands) L Kerkhove (Belarus) L Marozava	5	3
(Romania) I Bara (France) A Cornet	5	7^{7}	3
4	(Slovenia) A Klepač (Spain) MJ Martínez Sánchez	7	6^{3}	6

Second round
8	(Belgium) E Mertens (Netherlands) D Schuurs	6	6
(Russia) E Makarova (Russia) V Zvonareva	4	4
LL	(Spain) G García Pérez (Hungary) F Stollár	2	4
12	(United States) N Melichar (Czech Republic) K Peschke	6	6
15	(Romania) I-C Begu (Romania) M Buzărnescu	6	6
(Romania) A Bogdan (United States) K Christian	2	2
(Croatia) P Martić (Slovakia) M Rybáriková	3	5
4	(Slovenia) A Klepač (Spain) MJ Martínez Sánchez	6	7

Third round
8	(Belgium) E Mertens (Netherlands) D Schuurs	6^{4}	3
12	(United States) N Melichar (Czech Republic) K Peschke	7^{7}	6
15	(Romania) I-C Begu (Romania) M Buzărnescu	7^{7}	6
4	(Slovenia) A Klepač (Spain) MJ Martínez Sánchez	6^{5}	4

Quarterfinals
12	(United States) N Melichar (Czech Republic) K Peschke	5	6	6
15	(Romania) I-C Begu (Romania) M Buzărnescu	7	4	4

==== Section 4 ====
First round
6	(Canada) G Dabrowski (China) Y Xu	6^{5}	6	10
(United States) A Riske (Ukraine) O Savchuk	7^{7}	2	8
(Japan) S Aoyama (United States) J Brady	6	6
(Croatia) D Jurak (China) Q Wang	2	3
(Greece) M Sakkari (Croatia) D Vekić	0	0
Q	(China) X Han (Thailand) L Kumkhum	6	6
(Slovenia) D Jakupović (Russia) I Khromacheva	2	2
17/PR	(United States) V King (Slovenia) K Srebotnik	6	6
16	(Ukraine) L Kichenok (Russia) A Kudryavtseva	6^{6}	5
(United States) B Mattek-Sands (Czech Republic) L Šafářová	7^{8}	7
(Argentina) M Irigoyen (Germany) C Witthöft	4	3
(Estonia) K Kanepi (Germany) A Petkovic	6	6
(Ukraine) K Bondarenko (Serbia) A Krunić	1	3
WC	(United Kingdom) H Dart (United Kingdom) K Dunne	6	6
(Slovenia) P Hercog (United States) B Pera	6	1	4
2	(Czech Republic) A Sestini Hlaváčková (Czech Republic) B Strýcová	4	6	6

Second round
6	(Canada) G Dabrowski (China) Y Xu	6	4	6
(Japan) S Aoyama (United States) J Brady	1	6	3
Q	(China) X Han (Thailand) L Kumkhum	3	6	3
17/PR	(United States) V King (Slovenia) K Srebotnik	6	3	6
(United States) B Mattek-Sands (Czech Republic) L Šafářová	6	6
(Estonia) K Kanepi (Germany) A Petkovic	4	4
WC	(United Kingdom) H Dart (United Kingdom) K Dunne	2	4
2	(Czech Republic) A Sestini Hlaváčková (Czech Republic) B Strýcová	6	6

Third round
6	(Canada) G Dabrowski (China) Y Xu	6	6
17/PR	(United States) V King (Slovenia) K Srebotnik	3	3
(United States) B Mattek-Sands (Czech Republic) L Šafářová	2	7^{9}	6
2	(Czech Republic) A Sestini Hlaváčková (Czech Republic) B Strýcová	6	6^{7}	4

Quarterfinals
6	(Canada) G Dabrowski (China) Y Xu	5	6	6
(United States) B Mattek-Sands (Czech Republic) L Šafářová	7	4	2
