= 2018 Wimbledon Championships =

Grand Slam tennis tournament in London, July 2018

- Date: 2–15 July
- Edition: 132nd
- Category: Grand Slam (ITF)
- Draw: 128S / 64D / 48XD
- Prize money: £34,000,000
- Surface: Grass
- Location: Church Road; SW19, Wimbledon, London, United Kingdom
- Venue: All England Lawn Tennis and Croquet Club

Champions

Men's singles
- (Serbia) Novak Djokovic

Women's singles
- (Germany) Angelique Kerber

Men's doubles
- (United States) Mike Bryan / (United States) Jack Sock

Women's doubles
- (Czech Republic) Barbora Krejčíková / (Czech Republic) Kateřina Siniaková

Mixed doubles
- (Austria) Alexander Peya / (United States) Nicole Melichar

Wheelchair men's singles
- (Sweden) Stefan Olsson

Wheelchair women's singles
- (Netherlands) Diede de Groot

Wheelchair men's doubles
- (United Kingdom) Alfie Hewett / (United Kingdom) Gordon Reid

Wheelchair women's doubles
- (Netherlands) Diede de Groot / (Japan) Yui Kamiji

Wheelchair quad doubles
- (United Kingdom) Andrew Lapthorne / (United States) David Wagner

Boys' singles
- (Chinese Taipei) Tseng Chun-hsin

Girls' singles
- (Poland) Iga Świątek

Boys' doubles
- (Turkey) Yankı Erel / (Finland) Otto Virtanen

Girls' doubles
- (China) Wang Xinyu / (China) Wang Xiyu

Gentlemen's invitation doubles
- (Germany) Tommy Haas / (Australia) Mark Philippoussis

Ladies' invitation doubles
- (Belgium) Kim Clijsters / (Australia) Rennae Stubbs

Senior gentlemen's invitation doubles
- (Sweden) Jonas Björkman / (Australia) Todd Woodbridge
- Wimbledon Championships

The 2018 Wimbledon Championships was a Grand Slam tennis tournament which took place at the All England Lawn Tennis and Croquet Club in Wimbledon, London, United Kingdom. The main tournament began on Monday, 2 July 2018 and finished on Sunday, 15 July 2018. Novak Djokovic won the gentlemen's singles title and Angelique Kerber won the ladies' singles title.

The 2018 tournament was the 132nd edition of The Championships, the 125th staging of the ladies' singles Championship event, the 51st in the Open Era and the third Grand Slam tournament of the year. It was played on grass courts and was part of the ATP World Tour, the WTA Tour, the ITF Junior tour and the NEC Tour. The tournament was organised by All England Lawn Tennis Club and International Tennis Federation.

Roger Federer and Garbiñe Muguruza were both unsuccessful in defending their 2017 titles. Federer lost in the quarterfinals to eventual finalist Kevin Anderson, while Muguruza lost in the second round to Alison Van Uytvanck.

== Tournament ==
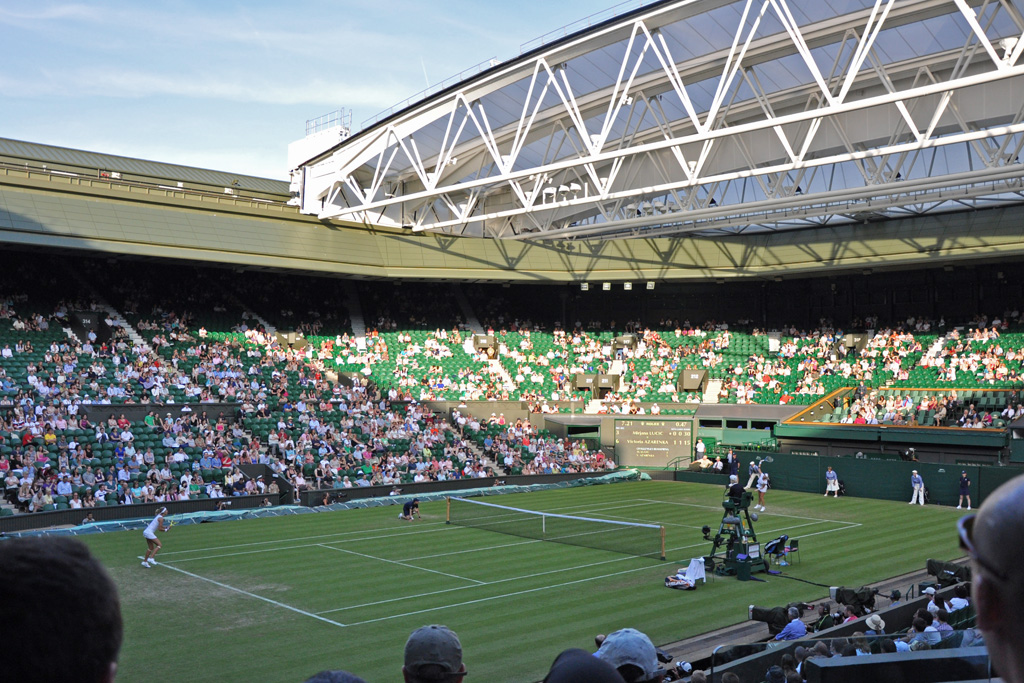
Centre Court where the Finals of Wimbledon take place

The 2018 Wimbledon Championships was the 132nd edition of the tournament and was held at the All England Lawn Tennis and Croquet Club in London.

The tournament was run by the International Tennis Federation (ITF) and included in the 2018 ATP World Tour and the 2018 WTA Tour calendars under the Grand Slam category. The tournament consisted of men's (singles and doubles), women's (singles and doubles), mixed doubles, boys' (under 18 – singles and doubles) and girls' (under 18 – singles and doubles), which was also a part of the Grade A category of tournaments for under 18, and singles and doubles events for men's and women's wheelchair tennis players as part of the UNIQLO Tour under the Grand Slam category.

The tournament was played only on grass courts; the main draw matches were played at the All England Lawn Tennis and Croquet Club, Wimbledon. Qualifying matches were played, from Monday 25 June to Thursday 28 June 2018, at the Bank of England Sports Ground, Roehampton. The Tennis sub-committee met to decide wild card entries on 19 June.

== Point and prize money distribution ==
=== Point distribution ===
Below is the tables with the point distribution for each phase of the tournament.

==== Senior points ====
Event	W	F	SF	QF	Round of 16	Round of 32	Round of 64	Round of 128	Q	Q3	Q2	Q1
Men's singles	2000	1200	720	360	180	90	45	10	25	16	8	0
Men's doubles	2000	1200	720	360	180	90	0	—	25	—	0	0
Women's singles	2000	1300	780	430	240	130	70	10	40	30	20	2
Women's doubles	2000	1300	780	430	240	130	10	—	—	—	—	—

==== Wheelchair points ====
Event	W	F	3rd	4th
Singles	800	500	375	100
Doubles	800	500	100	—

==== Junior points ====
Event	W	F	SF	QF	Round of 16	Round of 32	Q	Q3
Boys' singles	1000	600	370	200	100	45	30	20
Girls' singles	1000	600	370	200	100	45	30	20
Boys' doubles	750	450	275	150	75	—N/a	—N/a	—N/a
Girls' doubles	750	450	275	150	75	—N/a	—N/a	—N/a

=== Prize money ===
The Wimbledon total prize money for 2018 had increased to £34,000,000, up by 7.6% on 2017. The winners of the men's and women's singles titles would earn £2.25m. Prize money for the men's and women's doubles and wheelchair players were also increased for the 2018 competition.

A new rule in 2018 was that any first round singles player who was unfit to play and withdrew on-site after 12pm on Thursday before the start of the Main Draw would receive half of the First Round prize money, with the other half awarded to the replacement lucky loser. Any player who competed in the First Round Main Draw singles and retired or performs below professional standards, might now be subject to a fine of up to First Round prize money, to deter players from appearing only to claim prize money.

Event	W	F	SF	QF	Round of 16	Round of 32	Round of 64	Round of 128	Q3	Q2	Q1
Singles	£2,250,000	£1,125,000	£562,000	£281,000	£163,000	£100,000	£63,000	£39,000	£19,500	£9,750	£4,875
Doubles*	£450,000	£225,000	£112,000	£56,000	£29,000	£17,750	£11,500	—	—	—	—
Mixed doubles*	£110,000	£55,000	£27,500	£13,750	£6,500	£3,250	£1,625	—	—	—	—
Wheelchair singles	£40,000	£20,000	£13,000	£8,500	—	—	—	—	—	—	—
Wheelchair doubles*	£14,000	£7,000	£4,500	—	—	—	—	—	—	—	—
Invitation doubles	£26,000	£22,000	£19,000	—	—	—	—	—	—	—	—

_{* per team}

== Singles players ==
=== Gentlemen's singles ===
Champion		Runner-up	
(Serbia) Novak Djokovic [12]		(South Africa) Kevin Anderson [8]	
Semifinals out
(United States) John Isner [9]		(Spain) Rafael Nadal [2]	
Quarterfinals out
(Switzerland) Roger Federer [1]	(Canada) Milos Raonic [13]	(Japan) Kei Nishikori [24]	(Argentina) Juan Martín del Potro [5]
4th round out
(France) Adrian Mannarino [22]	(France) Gaël Monfils	(United States) Mackenzie McDonald	(Greece) Stefanos Tsitsipas [31]
(Russia) Karen Khachanov	(Latvia) Ernests Gulbis (Q)	(France) Gilles Simon	(Czech Republic) Jiří Veselý
3rd round out
(Germany) Jan-Lennard Struff	(Russia) Daniil Medvedev	(United States) Sam Querrey [11]	(Germany) Philipp Kohlschreiber [25]
(Argentina) Guido Pella	(Austria) Dennis Novak (Q)	(Moldova) Radu Albot	(Italy) Thomas Fabbiano (Q)
(United States) Frances Tiafoe	(United Kingdom) Kyle Edmund [21]	(Australia) Nick Kyrgios [15]	(Germany) Alexander Zverev [4]
(France) Benoît Paire	(Australia) Matthew Ebden	(Italy) Fabio Fognini [19]	(Australia) Alex de Minaur
2nd round out
(Slovakia) Lukáš Lacko	(Croatia) Ivo Karlović	(United States) Ryan Harrison	(Spain) Guillermo García López
(Ukraine) Sergiy Stakhovsky (WC)	(Italy) Paolo Lorenzi	(Luxembourg) Gilles Müller	(Italy) Andreas Seppi
(Croatia) Marin Čilić [3]	(Chile) Nicolás Jarry	(France) Lucas Pouille [17]	(Australia) John Millman
(Belgium) Ruben Bemelmans (Q)	(Slovenia) Aljaž Bedene	(United States) Jared Donaldson	(Switzerland) Stan Wawrinka
(Cyprus) Marcos Baghdatis	(France) Julien Benneteau	(United States) Bradley Klahn (Q)	(Argentina) Horacio Zeballos
(Netherlands) Robin Haase	(Australia) Bernard Tomic (LL)	(Bosnia and Herzegovina) Damir Džumhur [27]	(United States) Taylor Fritz
(Spain) Feliciano López	(Canada) Denis Shapovalov [26]	(Italy) Matteo Berrettini	(France) Stéphane Robert (Q)
(Argentina) Diego Schwartzman [14]	(Italy) Simone Bolelli (LL)	(France) Pierre-Hugues Herbert	(Kazakhstan) Mikhail Kukushkin
1st round out
(Serbia) Dušan Lajović	(France) Benjamin Bonzi (Q)	(Russia) Mikhail Youzhny	(Argentina) Leonardo Mayer [32]
(Chile) Christian Garín (Q)	(Spain) Roberto Carballés Baena	(Portugal) Gastão Elias	(Croatia) Borna Ćorić [16]
(Australia) Jordan Thompson	(Portugal) João Sousa	(Serbia) Laslo Đere	(France) Richard Gasquet [23]
(Russia) Evgeny Donskoy	(United States) Michael Mmoh (LL)	(Australia) John-Patrick Smith (Q)	(Slovakia) Norbert Gombos (Q)
(Japan) Yoshihito Nishioka (PR)	(Australia) Jason Kubler (Q)	(Lithuania) Ričardas Berankis	(Serbia) Filip Krajinović [28]
(United States) Denis Kudla (WC)	(Canada) Peter Polansky (LL)	(Italy) Stefano Travaglia (Q)	(United Kingdom) Liam Broady (WC)
(Germany) Yannick Maden (Q)	(United States) Steve Johnson	(United Kingdom) Cameron Norrie	(Spain) Pablo Carreño Busta [20]
(France) Grégoire Barrère (Q)	(Tunisia) Malek Jaziri	(India) Yuki Bhambri	(Bulgaria) Grigor Dimitrov [6]
(Austria) Dominic Thiem [7]	(Spain) David Ferrer	(Hungary) Márton Fucsovics	(Spain) Fernando Verdasco [30]
(Australia) Alex Bolt (Q)	(Japan) Yūichi Sugita	(Argentina) Guido Andreozzi	(United States) Tennys Sandgren
(Uzbekistan) Denis Istomin	(Romania) Marius Copil	(Poland) Hubert Hurkacz (LL)	(United States) Christian Harrison (Q)
(Germany) Maximilian Marterer	(United Kingdom) Jay Clarke (WC)	(Italy) Lorenzo Sonego (LL)	(Australia) James Duckworth (PR)
(Germany) Peter Gojowczyk	(Argentina) Federico Delbonis	(Chinese Taipei) Jason Jung (LL)	(France) Jérémy Chardy
(United States) Jack Sock [16]	(Georgia (country)) Nikoloz Basilashvili	(Spain) Albert Ramos Viñolas	(Belgium) David Goffin [10]
(Bosnia and Herzegovina) Mirza Bašić	(Germany) Florian Mayer	(Uruguay) Pablo Cuevas	(Japan) Taro Daniel
(Italy) Marco Cecchinato [29]	(Germany) Mischa Zverev	(Canada) Vasek Pospisil	(Israel) Dudi Sela

=== Ladies' singles ===
Champion		Runner-up	
(Germany) Angelique Kerber [11]		(United States) Serena Williams [25/PR]	
Semifinals out
(Latvia) Jeļena Ostapenko [12]		(Germany) Julia Görges [13]	
Quarterfinals out
(Slovakia) Dominika Cibulková	(Russia) Daria Kasatkina [14]	(Netherlands) Kiki Bertens [20]	(Italy) Camila Giorgi
4th round out
(Chinese Taipei) Hsieh Su-wei	(Belarus) Aliaksandra Sasnovich	(Belgium) Alison Van Uytvanck	(Switzerland) Belinda Bencic
(Czech Republic) Karolína Plíšková [7]	(Croatia) Donna Vekić	(Russia) Evgeniya Rodina (Q)	(Russia) Ekaterina Makarova
3rd round out
(Romania) Simona Halep [1]	(Belgium) Elise Mertens [15]	(Russia) Vitalia Diatchenko (Q)	(Australia) Daria Gavrilova [26]
(Estonia) Anett Kontaveit [28]	(Australia) Ashleigh Barty [17]	(Japan) Naomi Osaka [18]	(Spain) Carla Suárez Navarro [27]
(Romania) Mihaela Buzărnescu [29]	(United States) Venus Williams [9]	(Czech Republic) Barbora Strýcová [23]	(Belgium) Yanina Wickmayer
(France) Kristina Mladenovic	(United States) Madison Keys [10]	(Czech Republic) Kateřina Siniaková	(Czech Republic) Lucie Šafářová
2nd round out
(China) Zheng Saisai (PR)	(Spain) Lara Arruabarrena	(United Kingdom) Johanna Konta [22]	(United States) Sachia Vickery
(Belgium) Kirsten Flipkens	(United States) Sofia Kenin	(Australia) Samantha Stosur	(United States) Taylor Townsend
(Spain) Garbiñe Muguruza [3]	(United States) Jennifer Brady	(Canada) Eugenie Bouchard (Q)	(Kazakhstan) Yulia Putintseva
(United States) Claire Liu (Q)	(United Kingdom) Katie Boulter (WC)	(Spain) Sara Sorribes Tormo (Q)	(United States) Alison Riske
(Belarus) Victoria Azarenka	(United Kingdom) Katie Swan (WC)	(Russia) Anna Blinkova	(Romania) Alexandra Dulgheru (Q)
(Belarus) Vera Lapko	(Ukraine) Lesia Tsurenko	(Germany) Andrea Petkovic	(Sweden) Rebecca Peterson
(Germany) Tatjana Maria	(Bulgaria) Viktoriya Tomova (Q)	(Romania) Sorana Cîrstea	(Thailand) Luksika Kumkhum
(Tunisia) Ons Jabeur (WC)	(United States) Madison Brengle	(Poland) Agnieszka Radwańska [32]	(Denmark) Caroline Wozniacki [2]
1st round out
(Japan) Kurumi Nara	(China) Wang Qiang	(Romania) Ana Bogdan	(Russia) Anastasia Pavlyuchenkova [30]
(Russia) Natalia Vikhlyantseva	(France) Alizé Cornet	(Czech Republic) Markéta Vondroušová	(United States) Danielle Collins
(United Kingdom) Katy Dunne (WC)	(United Kingdom) Heather Watson	(Greece) Maria Sakkari	(Russia) Maria Sharapova [24]
(United States) Caroline Dolehide (LL)	(China) Peng Shuai	(France) Pauline Parmentier	(Czech Republic) Petra Kvitová [8]
(United Kingdom) Naomi Broady (WC)	(Slovenia) Polona Hercog	(Ukraine) Kateryna Kozlova	(Czech Republic) Denisa Allertová
(Switzerland) Stefanie Vögele	(United Kingdom) Gabriella Taylor (WC)	(Poland) Magda Linette	(Croatia) Jana Fett
(Russia) Vera Zvonareva (Q)	(Croatia) Ana Konjuh	(Paraguay) Verónica Cepede Royg	(Romania) Monica Niculescu
(Germany) Carina Witthöft	(Estonia) Kaia Kanepi	(Colombia) Mariana Duque Mariño (LL)	(France) Caroline Garcia [6]
(United Kingdom) Harriet Dart (WC)	(Russia) Ekaterina Alexandrova	(Romania) Irina-Camelia Begu	(Belarus) Aryna Sabalenka
(Czech Republic) Barbora Štefková (Q)	(China) Wang Yafan	(Czech Republic) Kristýna Plíšková	(Sweden) Johanna Larsson
(Puerto Rico) Monica Puig	(United States) Christina McHale	(Hungary) Tímea Babos	(Russia) Svetlana Kuznetsova
(China) Zhang Shuai [31]	(Germany) Mona Barthel (Q)	(Slovakia) Viktória Kužmová	(United States) Sloane Stephens [4]
(Ukraine) Elina Svitolina [5]	(Slovakia) Anna Karolína Schmiedlová	(Czech Republic) Tereza Smitková (WC)	(Netherlands) Arantxa Rus
(Slovakia) Magdaléna Rybáriková [19]	(Germany) Antonia Lottner (Q)	(United States) Bernarda Pera	(Australia) Ajla Tomljanović
(United States) Coco Vandeweghe [16]	(Switzerland) Viktorija Golubic	(Serbia) Aleksandra Krunić	(Latvia) Anastasija Sevastova [21]
(Romania) Elena-Gabriela Ruse (Q)	(Ukraine) Kateryna Bondarenko	(Croatia) Petra Martić	(United States) Varvara Lepchenko

== Singles seeds ==
=== Gentlemen's singles ===
The seeds for men's singles are adjusted on a surface-based system to reflect more accurately the individual player's grass court achievement as per the following formula, which applies to the top 32 players according to the ATP rankings on 25 June 2018:

- Take Entry System Position points at 25 June 2018.
- Add 100% points earned for all grass court tournaments in the past 12 months (26 June 2017 – 24 June 2018).
- Add 75% points earned for best grass court tournament in the 12 months before that (20 June 2016 – 25 June 2017).

Rank and points before are as of 2 July 2018.

Seed	Rank	Player	Points before	Points defending	Points won	Points after	Status
1	2	(Switzerland) Roger Federer	8,720	2,000	360	7,080	Quarterfinals lost to (South Africa) Kevin Anderson [8]
2	1	(Spain) Rafael Nadal	8,770	180	720	9,310	Semifinals lost to (Serbia) Novak Djokovic [12]
3	5	(Croatia) Marin Čilić	5,060	1,200	45	3,905	Second round lost to (Argentina) Guido Pella
4	3	(Germany) Alexander Zverev	5,755	180	90	5,665	Third round lost to (Latvia) Ernests Gulbis [Q]
5	4	(Argentina) Juan Martín del Potro	5,080	45	360	5,395	Quarterfinals lost to (Spain) Rafael Nadal [2]
6	6	(Bulgaria) Grigor Dimitrov	4,780	180	10	4,610	First round lost to (Switzerland) Stan Wawrinka
7	7	(Austria) Dominic Thiem	3,835	180	10	3,665	First round retired against (Cyprus) Marcos Baghdatis
8	8	(South Africa) Kevin Anderson	3,635	180	1,200	4,655	Runner-up, lost to (Serbia) Novak Djokovic [12]
9	10	(United States) John Isner	3,045	45	720	3,720	Semifinals lost to (South Africa) Kevin Anderson [8]
10	9	(Belgium) David Goffin	3,110	0	10	3,120	First round lost to (Australia) Matthew Ebden
11	13	(United States) Sam Querrey	2,130	720	90	1,500	Third round lost to (France) Gaël Monfils
12	21	(Serbia) Novak Djokovic	1,715	360	2,000	3,355	Champion, defeated (South Africa) Kevin Anderson [8]
13	32	(Canada) Milos Raonic	1,430	360	360	1,430	Quarterfinals lost to (United States) John Isner [9]
14	11	(Argentina) Diego Schwartzman	2,435	10	45	2,470	Second round lost to (Czech Republic) Jiří Veselý
15	18	(Australia) Nick Kyrgios	1,855	10	90	1,935	Third round lost to (Japan) Kei Nishikori [24]
16	20	(Croatia) Borna Ćorić	1,745	10	10	1,745	First round lost to (Russia) Daniil Medvedev
17	19	(France) Lucas Pouille	1,835	45	45	1,835	Second round lost to (Austria) Dennis Novak [Q]
18	15	(United States) Jack Sock	2,110	45	10	2,075	First round lost to (Italy) Matteo Berrettini
19	16	(Italy) Fabio Fognini	2,030	90	90	2,030	Third round lost to (Czech Republic) Jiří Veselý
20	12	(Spain) Pablo Carreño Busta	2,145	0	10	2,155	First round lost to (Moldova) Radu Albot
21	17	(United Kingdom) Kyle Edmund	1,950	45	90	1,995	Third round lost to (Serbia) Novak Djokovic [12]
22	26	(France) Adrian Mannarino	1,580	180	180	1,580	Fourth round lost to (Switzerland) Roger Federer [1]
23	31	(France) Richard Gasquet	1,465	10	10	1,465	First round lost to (France) Gaël Monfils
24	28	(Japan) Kei Nishikori	1,530	90	360	1,800	Quarterfinals lost to (Serbia) Novak Djokovic [12]
25	27	(Germany) Philipp Kohlschreiber	1,575	10	90	1,655	Third round lost to (South Africa) Kevin Anderson [8]
26	25	(Canada) Denis Shapovalov	1,588	0	45	1,633	Second round lost to (France) Benoît Paire
27	23	(Bosnia and Herzegovina) Damir Džumhur	1,665	45	45	1,665	Second round lost to (Latvia) Ernests Gulbis [Q]
28	30	(Serbia) Filip Krajinović	1,489	(80)^{†}	10	1,419	First round lost to (Chile) Nicolás Jarry
29	29	(Italy) Marco Cecchinato	1,514	10+10	10+6	1,510	First round lost to (Australia) Alex de Minaur
30	34	(Spain) Fernando Verdasco	1,280	10	10	1,280	First round lost to (United States) Frances Tiafoe
31	35	(Greece) Stefanos Tsitsipas	1,254	35	180	1,399	Fourth round lost to (United States) John Isner [9]
32	36	(Argentina) Leonardo Mayer	1,235	(48)^{†}	10	1,197	First round lost to (Germany) Jan-Lennard Struff

† The player did not qualify for the tournament in 2017 but is defending points from the 2017 ATP Challenger Tour instead.

==== Withdrawn players ====
Rank	Player	Points before	Points defending	Points after	Reason
14	(Spain) Roberto Bautista Agut	2,120	180	1,940	Hip injury
22	(South Korea) Chung Hyeon	1,685	0	1,685	Ankle injury
24	(Czech Republic) Tomáš Berdych	1,625	720	905	Back injury
33	(Russia) Andrey Rublev	1,281	70	1,211	Back injury

=== Ladies' singles ===
The seeds for ladies' singles are based on the WTA rankings as of 25 June 2018, with an exception for Serena Williams (details are given below). Rank and points before are as of 2 July 2018.

Seed	Rank	Player	Points before	Points defending	Points won	Points after	Status
1	1	(Romania) Simona Halep	7,871	430	130	7,571	Third round lost to (Chinese Taipei) Hsieh Su-wei
2	2	(Denmark) Caroline Wozniacki	6,910	240	70	6,740	Second round lost to (Russia) Ekaterina Makarova
3	3	(Spain) Garbiñe Muguruza	6,550	2,000	70	4,620	Second round lost to (Belgium) Alison Van Uytvanck
4	4	(United States) Sloane Stephens	5,463	10	10	5,463	First round lost to (Croatia) Donna Vekić
5	5	(Ukraine) Elina Svitolina	5,250	240	10	5,020	First round lost to (Germany) Tatjana Maria
6	6	(France) Caroline Garcia	4,960	240	10	4,730	First round lost to (Switzerland) Belinda Bencic
7	8	(Czech Republic) Karolína Plíšková	4,315	70	240	4,485	Fourth round lost to (Netherlands) Kiki Bertens [20]
8	7	(Czech Republic) Petra Kvitová	4,610	70	10	4,550	First round lost to (Belarus) Aliaksandra Sasnovich
9	9	(United States) Venus Williams	3,971	1,300	130	2,801	Third round lost to (Netherlands) Kiki Bertens [20]
10	11	(United States) Madison Keys	3,536	70	130	3,596	Third round lost to (Russia) Evgeniya Rodina [Q]
11	10	(Germany) Angelique Kerber	3,545	240	2,000	5,305	Champion, defeated (United States) Serena Williams [25/PR]
12	12	(Latvia) Jeļena Ostapenko	3,437	430	780	3,787	Semifinals lost to (Germany) Angelique Kerber [11]
13	13	(Germany) Julia Görges	3,210	10	780	3,980	Semifinals lost to (United States) Serena Williams [25/PR]
14	14	(Russia) Daria Kasatkina	3,165	70	430	3,525	Quarterfinals lost to (Germany) Angelique Kerber [11]
15	15	(Belgium) Elise Mertens	2,635	10	130	2,755	Third round lost to (Slovakia) Dominika Cibulková
16	16	(United States) CoCo Vandeweghe	2,603	430	10	2,183	First round lost to (Czech Republic) Kateřina Siniaková
17	17	(Australia) Ashleigh Barty	2,435	10	130	2,555	Third round lost to (Russia) Daria Kasatkina [14]
18	18	(Japan) Naomi Osaka	2,350	130	130	2,350	Third round lost to (Germany) Angelique Kerber [11]
19	19	(Slovakia) Magdaléna Rybáriková	2,310	780	10	1,540	First round lost to (Romania) Sorana Cîrstea
20	20	(Netherlands) Kiki Bertens	2,090	10	430	2,510	Quarterfinals lost to (Germany) Julia Görges [13]
21	21	(Latvia) Anastasija Sevastova	2,005	70	10	1,945	First round lost to (Italy) Camila Giorgi
22	24	(United Kingdom) Johanna Konta	1,866	780	70	1,156	Second round lost to (Slovakia) Dominika Cibulková
23	23	(Czech Republic) Barbora Strýcová	1,915	70	130	1,975	Third round lost to (Germany) Julia Görges [13]
24	22	(Russia) Maria Sharapova	1,943	0	10	1,953	First round lost to (Russia) Vitalia Diatchenko [Q]
25^{‡}	181	(United States) Serena Williams	315	0	1,300	1,615	Runner-up, lost to (Germany) Angelique Kerber [11]
26	25	(Australia) Daria Gavrilova	1,765	10	130	1,885	Third round lost to (Belarus) Aliaksandra Sasnovich
27	26	(Spain) Carla Suárez Navarro	1,677	70	130	1,737	Third round lost to (Switzerland) Belinda Bencic
28	27	(Estonia) Anett Kontaveit	1,656	130	130	1,656	Third round lost to (Belgium) Alison Van Uytvanck
29	28	(Romania) Mihaela Buzărnescu	1,648	(85)^{†}	130	1,693	Third round lost to (Czech Republic) Karolína Plíšková [7]
30	29	(Russia) Anastasia Pavlyuchenkova	1,596	10	10	1,596	First round lost to (Chinese Taipei) Hsieh Su-wei
31	31	(China) Zhang Shuai	1,545	10	10	1,545	First round lost to (Germany) Andrea Petkovic
32	30	(Poland) Agnieszka Radwańska	1,580	240	70	1,410	Second round lost to (Czech Republic) Lucie Šafářová

† The player did not qualify for the tournament in 2017. Accordingly, points for her 16th-best result are deducted instead.
‡ Serena Williams was ranked outside the top 150 on the day when seeds were announced, because she missed most of the last 12-month period due to her pregnancy. Nevertheless, she was deemed a special case and seeded 25th by the organisers.

== Doubles seeds ==
=== Gentlemen's doubles ===
Team		Rank^{1}	Seed
(Austria) Oliver Marach	(Croatia) Mate Pavić	3	1
(Poland) Łukasz Kubot	(Brazil) Marcelo Melo	7	2
(Finland) Henri Kontinen	(Australia) John Peers	15	3
(France) Pierre-Hugues Herbert	(France) Nicolas Mahut	19	4
(United Kingdom) Jamie Murray	(Brazil) Bruno Soares	27	5
(Colombia) Juan Sebastián Cabal	(Colombia) Robert Farah	28	6
(United States) Mike Bryan	(United States) Jack Sock	31	7
(Croatia) Nikola Mektić	(Austria) Alexander Peya	37	8
(Pakistan) Aisam-ul-Haq Qureshi	(Netherlands) Jean-Julien Rojer	44	9
(Croatia) Ivan Dodig	(United States) Rajeev Ram	46	10
(Uruguay) Pablo Cuevas	(Spain) Marcel Granollers	50	11
(India) Rohan Bopanna	(France) Édouard Roger-Vasselin	50	12
(South Africa) Raven Klaasen	(New Zealand) Michael Venus	53	13
(Japan) Ben McLachlan	(Germany) Jan-Lennard Struff	61	14
(United Kingdom) Dominic Inglot	(Croatia) Franko Škugor	66	15
(Belarus) Max Mirnyi	(Austria) Philipp Oswald	75	16

- ^{1} Rankings were as of 25 June 2018.

=== Ladies' doubles ===
Team		Rank^{1}	Seed
(Hungary) Tímea Babos	(France) Kristina Mladenovic	12	1
(Czech Republic) Andrea Sestini Hlaváčková	(Czech Republic) Barbora Strýcová	12	2
(Czech Republic) Barbora Krejčíková	(Czech Republic) Kateřina Siniaková	15	3
(Slovenia) Andreja Klepač	(Spain) María José Martínez Sánchez	26	4
(Chinese Taipei) Latisha Chan	(China) Peng Shuai	27	5
(Canada) Gabriela Dabrowski	(China) Xu Yifan	27	6
(Chinese Taipei) Chan Hao-ching	(China) Yang Zhaoxuan	34	7
(Belgium) Elise Mertens	(Netherlands) Demi Schuurs	41	8
(Netherlands) Kiki Bertens	(Sweden) Johanna Larsson	45	9
(Australia) ~~Ashleigh Barty~~	(United States) ~~CoCo Vandeweghe~~	~~48~~	~~10~~
(United States) Raquel Atawo	(Germany) Anna-Lena Grönefeld	49	11
(United States) Nicole Melichar	(Czech Republic) Květa Peschke	51	12
(Belgium) Kirsten Flipkens	(Romania) Monica Niculescu	63	13
(Czech Republic) Lucie Hradecká	(Chinese Taipei) Hsieh Su-wei	67	14
(Romania) Irina-Camelia Begu	(Romania) Mihaela Buzărnescu	72	15
(Ukraine) Lyudmyla Kichenok	(Russia) Alla Kudryavtseva	77	16
(United States) Vania King	(Slovenia) Katarina Srebotnik	79	17

- ^{1} Rankings were as of 25 June 2018.

=== Mixed doubles ===
Team		Rank^{1}	Seed
(Croatia) Mate Pavić	(Canada) Gabriela Dabrowski	10	1
(Brazil) Bruno Soares	(Russia) Ekaterina Makarova	15	2
(Croatia) Ivan Dodig	(Chinese Taipei) Latisha Chan	21	3
(Netherlands) Jean-Julien Rojer	(Netherlands) Demi Schuurs	27	4
(Croatia) Nikola Mektić	(Chinese Taipei) Chan Hao-ching	29	5
(France) Édouard Roger-Vasselin	(Czech Republic) Andrea Sestini Hlaváčková	31	6
(Colombia) Robert Farah	(Germany) Anna-Lena Grönefeld	34	7
(United States) Rajeev Ram	(Slovenia) Andreja Klepač	42	8
(New Zealand) Michael Venus	(Slovenia) Katarina Srebotnik	51	9
(Colombia) Juan Sebastián Cabal	(United States) Abigail Spears	52	10
(Austria) Alexander Peya	(United States) Nicole Melichar	52	11
(Netherlands) Matwé Middelkoop	(Sweden) Johanna Larsson	55	12
(Belarus) Max Mirnyi	(Czech Republic) Květa Peschke	56	13
(Japan) Ben McLachlan	(Japan) Eri Hozumi	59	14
(Brazil) Marcelo Demoliner	(Spain) María José Martínez Sánchez	61	15
(Finland) Henri Kontinen	(United Kingdom) Heather Watson	65	16

- ^{1} Rankings were as of 2 July 2018.

== Champions ==
=== Seniors ===
==== Gentlemen's singles ====
- (Serbia) Novak Djokovic def. (South Africa) Kevin Anderson, 6–2, 6–2, 7–6^{(7–3)}

==== Ladies' singles ====
- (Germany) Angelique Kerber def. (United States) Serena Williams, 6–3, 6–3

==== Gentlemen's doubles ====
- (United States) Mike Bryan / (United States) Jack Sock def. (South Africa) Raven Klaasen / (New Zealand) Michael Venus, 6–3, 6–7^{(7–9)}, 6–3, 5–7, 7–5

==== Ladies' doubles ====
- (Czech Republic) Barbora Krejčíková / (Czech Republic) Kateřina Siniaková def. (United States) Nicole Melichar / (Czech Republic) Květa Peschke, 6–4, 4–6, 6–0

==== Mixed doubles ====
- (Austria) Alexander Peya / (United States) Nicole Melichar def. (United Kingdom) Jamie Murray / (Belarus) Victoria Azarenka, 7–6^{(7–1)}, 6–3

=== Juniors ===
==== Boys' singles ====
- (Chinese Taipei) Tseng Chun-hsin def. (United Kingdom) Jack Draper, 6–1, 6–7^{(2–7)}, 6–4

==== Girls' singles ====
- (Poland) Iga Świątek def. (Switzerland) Leonie Küng, 6–4, 6–2

==== Boys' doubles ====
- (Turkey) Yankı Erel / (Finland) Otto Virtanen def. (Colombia) Nicolás Mejía / (Czech Republic) Ondřej Štyler, 7–6^{(7–5)}, 6–4

==== Girls' doubles ====
- (China) Wang Xinyu / (China) Wang Xiyu def. (United States) Caty McNally / (United States) Whitney Osuigwe, 6–2, 6–1

=== Invitation ===
==== Gentlemen's invitation doubles ====
- (Germany) Tommy Haas / (Australia) Mark Philippoussis def. (United Kingdom) Colin Fleming / (Belgium) Xavier Malisse, 7–6^{(7–4)}, 6–4

==== Ladies' invitation doubles ====
- (Belgium) Kim Clijsters / (Australia) Rennae Stubbs def. (Zimbabwe) Cara Black / (United States) Martina Navratilova, 6–3, 6–4

==== Senior gentlemen's invitation doubles ====
- (Sweden) Jonas Björkman / (Australia) Todd Woodbridge def. (Netherlands) Richard Krajicek / (United Kingdom) Mark Petchey, 6–4, 6–3

=== Wheelchair events ===
==== Wheelchair gentlemen's singles ====
- (Sweden) Stefan Olsson def. (Argentina) Gustavo Fernández, 6–2, 0–6, 6–3

==== Wheelchair ladies' singles ====
- (Netherlands) Diede de Groot def. (Netherlands) Aniek van Koot, 6–3, 6–2

==== Wheelchair gentlemen's doubles ====
- (United Kingdom) Alfie Hewett / (United Kingdom) Gordon Reid def. (Belgium) Joachim Gérard / (Sweden) Stefan Olsson, 6–1, 6–4

==== Wheelchair ladies' doubles ====
- (Netherlands) Diede de Groot / (Japan) Yui Kamiji def. (Germany) Sabine Ellerbrock / (United Kingdom) Lucy Shuker, 6–1, 6–1

==== Wheelchair quad doubles ====
- (United Kingdom) Andrew Lapthorne / (United States) David Wagner def. (Australia) Dylan Alcott / (South Africa) Lucas Sithole, 6–2, 6–3

== Main draw wild card entries ==
The following players received wild cards into the main draw senior events.

=== Gentlemen's singles ===
- (United Kingdom) Liam Broady
- (United Kingdom) Jay Clarke
- (United States) Denis Kudla
- (Ukraine) Sergiy Stakhovsky

=== Ladies' singles ===
- (United Kingdom) Katie Boulter
- (United Kingdom) Naomi Broady
- (United Kingdom) Harriet Dart
- (United Kingdom) Katy Dunne
- (Tunisia) Ons Jabeur
- (Czech Republic) Tereza Smitková
- (United Kingdom) Katie Swan
- (United Kingdom) Gabriella Taylor

=== Gentlemen's doubles ===
- (United Kingdom) Luke Bambridge / (United Kingdom) Jonny O'Mara
- (Australia) Alex Bolt / (Australia) Lleyton Hewitt
- (United Kingdom) Liam Broady / (United Kingdom) Scott Clayton
- (United Kingdom) Jay Clarke / (United Kingdom) Cameron Norrie
- (Austria) Jürgen Melzer / (Canada) Daniel Nestor
- (Denmark) Frederik Nielsen / (United Kingdom) Joe Salisbury

=== Ladies' doubles ===
- (United Kingdom) Katie Boulter / (United Kingdom) Katie Swan
- (United Kingdom) Naomi Broady / (United States) Asia Muhammad
- (United Kingdom) Harriet Dart / (United Kingdom) Katy Dunne

=== Mixed doubles ===
- (United Kingdom) Luke Bambridge / (United Kingdom) Katie Boulter
- (United Kingdom) Jay Clarke / (United Kingdom) Harriet Dart
- (United Kingdom) Dominic Inglot / (Australia) Samantha Stosur
- (Australia) Thanasi Kokkinakis / (Australia) Ashleigh Barty
- (United Kingdom) Joe Salisbury / (United Kingdom) Katy Dunne

== Main draw qualifier entries ==
=== Gentlemen's singles ===
1. (United States) Christian Harrison
2. (Belgium) Ruben Bemelmans
3. (Austria) Dennis Novak
4. (France) Grégoire Barrère
5. (Italy) Stefano Travaglia
6. (Slovakia) Norbert Gombos
7. (France) Stéphane Robert
8. (Australia) Jason Kubler
9. (Germany) Yannick Maden
10. (Australia) John-Patrick Smith
11. (Chile) Christian Garín
12. (Latvia) Ernests Gulbis
13. (Australia) Alex Bolt
14. (France) Benjamin Bonzi
15. (United States) Bradley Klahn
16. (Italy) Thomas Fabbiano

==== Lucky losers ====
1. (Australia) Bernard Tomic
2. (Canada) Peter Polansky
3. (United States) Michael Mmoh
4. (Poland) Hubert Hurkacz
5. (Italy) Lorenzo Sonego
6. (Italy) Simone Bolelli
7. (Chinese Taipei) Jason Jung

=== Ladies' singles ===
1. (Romania) Alexandra Dulgheru
2. (Canada) Eugenie Bouchard
3. (Spain) Sara Sorribes Tormo
4. (Germany) Antonia Lottner
5. (United States) Claire Liu
6. (Russia) Vera Zvonareva
7. (Bulgaria) Viktoriya Tomova
8. (Germany) Mona Barthel
9. (Russia) Evgeniya Rodina
10. (Romania) Elena-Gabriela Ruse
11. (Russia) Vitalia Diatchenko
12. (Czech Republic) Barbora Štefková

==== Lucky losers ====
1. (Colombia) Mariana Duque Mariño
2. (United States) Caroline Dolehide

=== Gentlemen's doubles ===
1. (India) Sriram Balaji / (India) Vishnu Vardhan
2. (Germany) Kevin Krawietz / (Germany) Andreas Mies
3. (Germany) Andre Begemann / (Japan) Yasutaka Uchiyama
4. (United States) Austin Krajicek / (India) Jeevan Nedunchezhiyan

=== Ladies' doubles ===
1. (Belgium) Ysaline Bonaventure / (Netherlands) Bibiane Schoofs
2. (Chile) Alexa Guarachi / (New Zealand) Erin Routliffe
3. (China) Han Xinyun / (Thailand) Luksika Kumkhum
4. (Australia) Arina Rodionova / (Belgium) Maryna Zanevska

The following pairs received entry as lucky losers:

1. (Germany) Nicola Geuer / (Switzerland) Viktorija Golubic
2. (Spain) Georgina García Pérez / (Hungary) Fanny Stollár
3. (Russia) Anna Blinkova / (Czech Republic) Markéta Vondroušová

== Protected ranking ==
The following players were accepted directly into the main draw using a protected ranking:

Gentlemen's Singles

- (Japan) Yoshihito Nishioka (66)
- (Australia) James Duckworth (105)

Ladies' Singles

- (United States) Serena Williams (1)
- (China) Zheng Saisai (88)

== Withdrawals ==
The following players were accepted directly into the main tournament but withdrew with injuries, suspensions, or personal reasons:

Gentlemen's Singles

- ‡ (France) Jo-Wilfried Tsonga (37) → replaced by (Serbia) Laslo Đere (103)
- ‡ (Chinese Taipei) Lu Yen-hsun (71 PR) → replaced by (Germany) Cedrik-Marcel Stebe (104)
- ‡ (Argentina) Nicolás Kicker (84) → replaced by (Israel) Dudi Sela (105)
- ‡ (Germany) Cedrik-Marcel Stebe (104) → replaced by (Spain) Pablo Andújar (105 PR)
- ‡ (Czech Republic) Tomáš Berdych (18) → replaced by (Argentina) Guido Andreozzi (109)
- † (Spain) Roberto Bautista Agut (14) → replaced by (Canada) Peter Polansky (LL)
- † (Russia) Andrey Rublev (31) → replaced by (Poland) Hubert Hurkacz (LL)
- † (Serbia) Viktor Troicki (89) → replaced by (United States) Michael Mmoh (LL)
- † (South Korea) Chung Hyeon (20) → replaced by (Italy) Lorenzo Sonego (LL)
- † (Spain) Pablo Andújar (105 PR) → replaced by (Australia) Bernard Tomic (LL)
- § (Ukraine) Alexandr Dolgopolov (54) → replaced by (Italy) Simone Bolelli (LL)
- § (United Kingdom) Andy Murray (45) → replaced by (Chinese Taipei) Jason Jung (LL)

Ladies' Singles

- ‡ (United States) Catherine Bellis (56) → replaced by (Netherlands) Arantxa Rus (106)
- ‡ (Russia) Elena Vesnina (43) → replaced by (Germany) Andrea Petkovic (107)
- ‡ (Brazil) Beatriz Haddad Maia (89) → replaced by (Russia) Anna Blinkova (108)
- ‡ (Germany) Laura Siegemund (32 PR) → replaced by (Croatia) Jana Fett (109)
- ‡ (Italy) Sara Errani (74) → replaced by (Switzerland) Viktorija Golubic (110)
- § (Switzerland) Timea Bacsinszky (63) → replaced by (Colombia) Mariana Duque Mariño (LL)
- § (Kazakhstan) Zarina Diyas (53) → replaced by (United States) Caroline Dolehide (LL)

‡ – withdrew from entry list before qualifying began
† – withdrew from entry list after qualifying began
§ – withdrew from main draw

Preceded by 2018 French Open	Grand Slam Tournaments	Succeeded by 2018 US Open
Preceded by 2017 Wimbledon Championships	The Championships, Wimbledon	Succeeded by 2019 Wimbledon Championships
