= 2018 Wimbledon Championships – Men's singles =

Men's singles
- 2018 Wimbledon Championships

Final
- Champion: (Serbia) Novak Djokovic
- Runner-up: (South Africa) Kevin Anderson
- Score: 6–2, 6–2, 7–6^{(7–3)}

Details
- Draw: 128 (16Q / 4WC)
- Seeds: 32

Events
Singles	men	women		boys	girls
Doubles	men	women	mixed	boys	girls
WC Singles	men	women	quad
WC Doubles	men	women	quad
Legends	men	women	seniors
- Wimbledon Championships

Novak Djokovic defeated Kevin Anderson in the final, 6–2, 6–2, 7–6^{(7–3)} to win the gentlemen's singles tennis title at the 2018 Wimbledon Championships. It was his fourth Wimbledon title and 13th major title overall, passing Roy Emerson to outright fourth place on the all time men's singles major wins list. The win was Djokovic's first title in over 12 months (his previous win having been at Eastbourne on July 1, 2017), and returned him to the top 10 in the ATP rankings. Entering the tournament ranked world No. 21, Djokovic was the lowest-ranked player to win Wimbledon since Goran Ivanišević was No. 125 in 2001.

In the semifinal encounter between Djokovic and Rafael Nadal, they played a notable five-set match lasting 5 hours and 15 minutes. One of the defining matches in the Djokovic–Nadal rivalry, it is widely considered one of the greatest matches in Wimbledon history and of all time; Djokovic won 6–4, 3–6, 7–6 (11–9), 3–6, 10–8 to advance to his 5th Wimbledon final.

The semifinals at this edition became the two longest in the history of the tournament, with Anderson and John Isner contesting the longest (6 hours, 36 minutes) and Djokovic and Nadal the second-longest (5 hours, 15 minutes).

Roger Federer was the defending champion and top seed, but lost in the quarterfinals to Anderson despite leading by two sets and having a match point in the third set. Nadal and Federer were in contention for the world No. 1 singles ranking; Nadal retained the top ranking by reaching the fourth round.

Feliciano López made his 66th consecutive major main draw appearance, surpassing Federer's all-time record.

== Progress of the competition ==
Roger Federer was the defending champion and top seed. Federer and Rafael Nadal were in contention for the ATP No. 1 ranking at the start of the tournament. Former champion and local favourite Andy Murray announced on the day before the tournament began that he was pulling out because he was not fully recovered from hip surgery. His place was taken by "lucky loser" Jason Jung.

2017 finalist and no. 3 seed Marin Čilić went out in the second round of the tournament, defeated by Guido Pella of Argentina. Čilić had been two sets up when rain stopped play, but had difficulty coping with the conditions after play was resumed, and complained to the umpire about the state of the grass. The following morning, when they returned to continue the match, Pella won in five sets.

Feliciano López made his 66th consecutive Grand Slam main draw appearance, surpassing the previous record of 65 consecutive appearances he jointly held with Federer. López was defeated in the second round by no 5 seed Juan Martín del Potro. This was the last Wimbledon appearance for former No. 3 and US Open champion Juan Martín del Potro.

Nadal retained his top ranking by reaching the semifinal. Federer lost in the quarterfinals to Kevin Anderson despite leading by two sets to love and having a match point in the third set. The semifinal match between Anderson and John Isner, lasting 6 hours 36 minutes, was the second longest men's singles match at Wimbledon and the third longest men's singles match in tennis history. Isner has thus played in the two longest matches in Wimbledon history (the other one being the record-holding 2010 match against Nicolas Mahut). The 2018 semifinals were the longest two semifinals in Wimbledon history.

Anderson became the first man representing South Africa to reach the Wimbledon men's singles final since Brian Norton in 1921 (South African-born Kevin Curren represented the United States when he was a finalist in 1985). Anderson held a total of five set points in the third set of the championship match, but was unable to force a fourth set.

== Seeds ==
All seedings per modified ATP rankings.

1. (Switzerland) Roger Federer (quarterfinals)
2. (Spain) Rafael Nadal (semifinals)
3. (Croatia) Marin Čilić (second round)
4. (Germany) Alexander Zverev (third round)
5. (Argentina) Juan Martín del Potro (quarterfinals)
6. (Bulgaria) Grigor Dimitrov (first round)
7. (Austria) Dominic Thiem (first round, retired)
8. (South Africa) Kevin Anderson (final)
9. (United States) John Isner (semifinals)
10. (Belgium) David Goffin (first round)
11. (United States) Sam Querrey (third round)
12. (Serbia) Novak Djokovic (champion)
13. (Canada) Milos Raonic (quarterfinals)
14. (Argentina) Diego Schwartzman (second round)
15. (Australia) Nick Kyrgios (third round)
16. (Croatia) Borna Ćorić (first round)

17. (France) Lucas Pouille (second round)
18. (United States) Jack Sock (first round)
19. (Italy) Fabio Fognini (third round)
20. (Spain) Pablo Carreño Busta (first round)
21. (United Kingdom) Kyle Edmund (third round)
22. (France) Adrian Mannarino (fourth round)
23. (France) Richard Gasquet (first round)
24. (Japan) Kei Nishikori (quarterfinals)
25. (Germany) Philipp Kohlschreiber (third round)
26. (Canada) Denis Shapovalov (second round)
27. (Bosnia and Herzegovina) Damir Džumhur (second round)
28. (Serbia) Filip Krajinović (first round)
29. (Italy) Marco Cecchinato (first round)
30. (Spain) Fernando Verdasco (first round)
31. (Greece) Stefanos Tsitsipas (fourth round)
32. (Argentina) Leonardo Mayer (first round)

Click on the seed number of a player to go to their draw section.

== Draw ==
Key

- Q = Qualifier
- WC = Wild card
- LL = Lucky loser
- Alt = Alternate
- ITF = ITF entry
- PR = Protected ranking
- SR = Special ranking
- SE = Special exempt
- JE = Junior exempt
- JR = Junior Accelerator Programme entrant
- CO = College Accelerator Programme entrant
- NG = Next Gen Accelerator Program entrant
- w/o = Walkover
- r = Retired
- d = Defaulted

=== Finals ===
Quarterfinals
1	(Switzerland) Roger Federer	6	7^{7}	5	4	11
8	(South Africa) Kevin Anderson	2	6^{5}	7	6	13
13	(Canada) Milos Raonic	7^{7}	6^{7}	4	3
9	(United States) John Isner	6^{2}	7^{9}	6	6
12	(Serbia) Novak Djokovic	6	3	6	6
24	(Japan) Kei Nishikori	3	6	2	2
5	(Argentina) Juan Martín del Potro	5	7^{9}	6	4	4
2	(Spain) Rafael Nadal	7	6^{7}	4	6	6

Semifinals
8	(South Africa) Kevin Anderson	7^{8}	6^{5}	6^{9}	6	26
9	(United States) John Isner	6^{6}	7^{7}	7^{11}	4	24
12	(Serbia) Novak Djokovic	6	3	7^{11}	3	10
2	(Spain) Rafael Nadal	4	6	6^{9}	6	8

Final
8	(South Africa) Kevin Anderson	2	2	6^{3}
12	(Serbia) Novak Djokovic	6	6	7^{7}

=== Top half ===
==== Section 1 ====
First round
1	(Switzerland) R Federer	6	6	6
(Serbia) D Lajović	1	3	4
(Slovakia) L Lacko	4	6	7^{7}	6
Q	(France) B Bonzi	6	3	6^{5}	4
(Croatia) I Karlović	4	7	7^{9}	6
(Russia) M Youzhny	6	5	6^{7}	3
(Germany) J-L Struff	3	6^{5}	7^{7}	7^{7}	6
32	(Argentina) L Mayer	6	7^{7}	6^{5}	6^{5}	1
22	(France) A Mannarino	6	1	7^{7}	6
Q	(Chile) C Garín	3	6	6^{4}	2
(United States) R Harrison	6	6	6
(Spain) R Carballés Baena	1	4	2
(Spain) G Garcia López	6	6	6
(Portugal) G Elias	2	4	2
(Russia) D Medvedev	7^{8}	6	6
16	(Croatia) B Ćorić	6^{6}	2	2

Second round
1	(Switzerland) R Federer	6	6	6
(Slovakia) L Lacko	4	4	1
(Croatia) I Karlović	7^{7}	6	6^{4}	6^{4}	11
(Germany) J-L Struff	6^{5}	3	7^{7}	7^{7}	13
22	(France) A Mannarino	7	7	7^{7}
(United States) R Harrison	5	5	6^{4}
(Spain) G García López	3	4	2
(Russia) D Medvedev	6	6	6

Third round
1	(Switzerland) R Federer	6	7	6
(Germany) J-L Struff	3	5	2
22	(France) A Mannarino	6	6	4	5	6
(Russia) D Medvedev	4	3	6	7	3

Fourth round
1	(Switzerland) R Federer	6	7	6
22	(France) A Mannarino	0	5	4

==== Section 2 ====
First round
11	(United States) S Querrey	6	6	6
(Australia) J Thompson	2	4	3
WC	(Ukraine) S Stakhovsky	6	6	5	1	6
(Portugal) J Sousa	3	3	7	6	4
(Serbia) L Đere	6^{1}	7^{7}	2	4
(Italy) P Lorenzi	7^{7}	6^{3}	6	6
(France) G Monfils	7^{8}	7	6
23	(France) R Gasquet	6^{6}	5	4
25	(Germany) P Kohlschreiber	6	6	7
(Russia) E Donskoy	2	4	5
(Luxembourg) G Müller	7	4	7^{9}	3	6
LL	(United States) M Mmoh	5	6	6^{7}	6	1
Q	(Australia) J-P Smith	2	4	1
(Italy) A Seppi	6	6	6
Q	(Slovakia) N Gombos	3	4	4
8	(South Africa) K Anderson	6	6	6

Second round
11	(United States) S Querrey	7^{7}	6	6
WC	(Ukraine) S Stakhovsky	6^{4}	3	3
(Italy) P Lorenzi	6	3	6^{5}	6^{3}
(France) G Monfils	3	6	7^{7}	7^{7}
25	(Germany) P Kohlschreiber	7^{8}	7^{7}	7^{7}
(Luxembourg) G Müller	6^{6}	6^{4}	6^{3}
(Italy) A Seppi	3	7^{7}	3	4
8	(South Africa) K Anderson	6	6^{5}	6	6

Third round
11	(United States) S Querrey	7	4	4	2
(France) G Monfils	5	6	6	6
25	(Germany) P Kohlschreiber	3	5	5
8	(South Africa) K Anderson	6	7	7

Fourth round
(France) G Monfils	6^{4}	6^{2}	7	6^{4}
8	(South Africa) K Anderson	7^{7}	7^{7}	5	7^{7}

==== Section 3 ====
First round
3	(Croatia) M Čilić	6	6	6
PR	(Japan) Y Nishioka	1	4	4
Q	(Australia) J Kubler	4	5	6	6^{3}
(Argentina) G Pella	6	7	4	7^{7}
(Lithuania) R Berankis	6	6^{6}	3	6^{6}
(United States) M McDonald	4	7^{8}	6	7^{8}
(Chile) N Jarry	6	3	7^{7}	6
28	(Serbia) F Krajinović	3	6	6^{5}	4
17	(France) L Pouille	6	6	2	6
WC	(United States) D Kudla	3	3	6	3
LL	(Canada) P Polansky	2	3	6^{7}
Q	(Austria) D Novak	6	6	7^{9}
(Australia) J Millman	6^{6}	6	7	6
Q	(Italy) S Travaglia	7^{8}	3	5	2
WC	(United Kingdom) L Broady	5	0	1
13	(Canada) M Raonic	7	6	6

Second round
3	(Croatia) M Čilić	6	6	4	6^{3}	5
(Argentina) G Pella	3	1	6	7^{7}	7
(United States) M McDonald	7^{7}	5	3	6	11
(Chile) N Jarry	6^{5}	7	6	2	9
17	(France) L Pouille	4	2	7^{10}	6	2
Q	(Austria) D Novak	6	6	6^{8}	3	6
(Australia) J Millman	6^{4}	6^{4}	6^{4}
13	(Canada) M Raonic	7^{7}	7^{7}	7^{7}

Third round
(Argentina) G Pella	4	4	6^{6}
(United States) M McDonald	6	6	7^{8}
Q	(Austria) D Novak	6^{5}	6	5	2
13	(Canada) M Raonic	7^{7}	4	7	6

Fourth round
(United States) M McDonald	3	4	7^{7}	2
13	(Canada) M Raonic	6	6	6^{5}	6

==== Section 4 ====
First round
9	(United States) J Isner	6	7^{7}	7
Q	(Germany) Y Maden	2	6^{4}	5
(United States) S Johnson	5	3	6	7^{7}	6
Q	(Belgium) R Bemelmans	7	6	4	6^{0}	8
(Slovenia) A Bedene	4	7^{7}	7^{7}	6
(United Kingdom) C Norrie	6	6^{4}	6^{4}	4
(Moldova) R Albot	3	6	6^{5}	6	6
20	(Spain) P Carreño Busta	6	0	7^{7}	2	1
31	(Greece) S Tsitsipas	6	6	6^{3}	7
Q	(France) G Barrère	3	4	7^{7}	5
(Tunisia) M Jaziri	6^{5}	3	1
(United States) J Donaldson	7^{7}	6	6
(India) Y Bhambri	6	3	3	2
Q	(Italy) T Fabbiano	2	6	6	6
(Switzerland) S Wawrinka	1	7^{7}	7^{7}	6
6	(Bulgaria) G Dimitrov	6	6^{3}	6^{5}	4

Second round
9	(United States) J Isner	6	6	6^{6}	6^{3}	7
Q	(Belgium) R Bemelmans	1	4	7^{8}	7^{7}	5
(Slovenia) A Bedene	2	6	6^{3}	7	3
(Moldova) R Albot	6	4	7^{7}	5	6
31	(Greece) S Tsitsipas	6	6	3	4	6
(United States) J Donaldson	3	2	6	6	3
Q	(Italy) T Fabbiano	7^{9}	6	7^{8}
(Switzerland) S Wawrinka	6^{7}	3	6^{6}

Third round
9	(United States) J Isner	6	6	6
(Moldova) R Albot	3	3	4
31	(Greece) S Tsitsipas	6	6	6
Q	(Italy) T Fabbiano	2	1	4

Fourth round
9	(United States) J Isner	6	7^{10}	7^{7}
31	(Greece) S Tsitsipas	4	6^{8}	6^{4}

=== Bottom half ===
==== Section 5 ====
First round
7	(Austria) D Thiem	4	5	0^{r}
(Cyprus) M Baghdatis	6	7	2
(Spain) D Ferrer	1	6^{3}	6	5
(Russia) K Khachanov	6	7^{7}	3	7
(France) J Benneteau	7	7	6
(Hungary) M Fucsovics	5	5	3
(United States) F Tiafoe	7^{8}	7^{7}	3	6
30	(Spain) F Verdasco	6^{6}	6^{5}	6	3
21	(United Kingdom) K Edmund	6	6	7
Q	(Australia) A Bolt	2	3	5
(Japan) Y Sugita	6	6^{6}	2	2
Q	(United States) B Klahn	2	7^{8}	6	6
(Argentina) G Andreozzi	6	6^{1}	4	4
(Argentina) H Zeballos	4	7^{7}	6	6
(United States) T Sandgren	3	1	2
12	(Serbia) N Djokovic	6	6	6

Second round
(Cyprus) M Baghdatis	3	4	6	7^{7}	5
(Russia) K Khachanov	6	6	3	6^{4}	7
(France) J Benneteau	6	3	4	2
(United States) F Tiafoe	4	6	6	6
21	(United Kingdom) K Edmund	6	7^{7}	6
Q	(United States) B Klahn	4	6^{0}	2
(Argentina) H Zeballos	1	2	3
12	(Serbia) N Djokovic	6	6	6

Third round
(Russia) K Khachanov	4	4	7^{7}	6	6
(United States) F Tiafoe	6	6	6^{3}	2	1
21	(United Kingdom) K Edmund	6	3	2	4
12	(Serbia) N Djokovic	4	6	6	6

Fourth round
(Russia) K Khachanov	4	2	2
12	(Serbia) N Djokovic	6	6	6

==== Section 6 ====
First round
15	(Australia) N Kyrgios	7^{7}	7^{7}	6^{5}	6
(Uzbekistan) D Istomin	6^{3}	6^{4}	7^{7}	3
(Romania) M Copil	6^{0}	5	6	6^{4}
(Netherlands) R Haase	7^{7}	7	4	7^{7}
LL	(Australia) B Tomic	6	6	7^{7}
LL	(Poland) H Hurkacz	4	2	6^{2}
Q	(United States) C Harrison	2	6	6^{3}	2
24	(Japan) K Nishikori	6	4	7^{7}	6
27	(Bosnia and Herzegovina) D Džumhur	6	6	6
(Germany) M Marterer	3	2	4
Q	(Latvia) E Gulbis	4	6	7^{7}	3	6
WC	(United Kingdom) J Clarke	6	3	6^{3}	6	4
LL	(Italy) L Sonego	6	3	2	2
(United States) T Fritz	3	6	6	6
PR	(Australia) J Duckworth	5	2	0
4	(Germany) A Zverev	7	6	6

Second round
15	(Australia) N Kyrgios	6	6	7
(Netherlands) R Haase	3	4	5
LL	(Australia) B Tomic	6	3	6^{7}	5
24	(Japan) K Nishikori	2	6	7^{9}	7
27	(Bosnia and Herzegovina) D Džumhur	6	4	3	6	3
Q	(Latvia) E Gulbis	2	6	6	1	6
(United States) T Fritz	4	7	7^{7}	1	2
4	(Germany) A Zverev	6	5	6^{0}	6	6

Third round
15	(Australia) N Kyrgios	1	6^{3}	4
24	(Japan) K Nishikori	6	7^{7}	6
Q	(Latvia) E Gulbis	7^{7}	4	5	6	6
4	(Germany) A Zverev	6^{2}	6	7	3	0

Fourth round
24	(Japan) K Nishikori	4	7^{7}	7^{12}	6
Q	(Latvia) E Gulbis	6	6^{5}	6^{10}	1

==== Section 7 ====
First round
5	(Argentina) JM del Potro	6	6	6
(Germany) P Gojowczyk	3	4	3
(Spain) F López	6	6	6
(Argentina) F Delbonis	3	4	2
(France) B Paire	7	7^{7}	6
LL	(Chinese Taipei) J Jung	5	6^{1}	4
(France) J Chardy	3	6	5	4
26	(Canada) D Shapovalov	6	3	7	6
18	(United States) J Sock	7^{7}	7^{7}	4	5	2
(Italy) M Berrettini	6^{5}	6^{3}	6	7	6
(France) G Simon	6	7^{7}	6
(Georgia (country)) N Basilashvili	1	6^{5}	1
(Spain) A Ramos Viñolas	6^{5}	2	1
Q	(France) S Robert	7^{7}	6	6
(Australia) M Ebden	6	6	6
10	(Belgium) D Goffin	4	3	4

Second round
5	(Argentina) JM del Potro	6	6	6
(Spain) F López	4	1	2
(France) B Paire	0	6	6	7^{7}
26	(Canada) D Shapovalov	6	2	4	6^{3}
(Italy) M Berrettini	3	6^{4}	2
(France) G Simon	6	7^{7}	6
Q	(France) S Robert	3	6^{5}	6	1
(Australia) M Ebden	6	7^{7}	4	6

Third round
5	(Argentina) JM del Potro	6	7^{7}	6
(France) B Paire	4	6^{4}	3
(France) G Simon	6	6^{3}	6	7^{7}
(Australia) M Ebden	1	7^{7}	3	6^{2}

Fourth round
5	(Argentina) JM del Potro	7^{7}	7^{7}	5	7^{7}
(France) G Simon	6^{1}	6^{5}	7	6^{5}

==== Section 8 ====
First round
14	(Argentina) D Schwartzman	6	6	6
(Bosnia and Herzegovina) M Bašić	3	2	1
(Czech Republic) J Veselý	7^{7}	6	4	6
(Germany) F Mayer	6^{3}	4	6	1
(Uruguay) P Cuevas	6^{5}	6^{6}	1
LL	(Italy) S Bolelli	7^{7}	7^{8}	6
(Japan) T Daniel	6	3	3	3
19	(Italy) F Fognini	3	6	6	6
29	(Italy) M Cecchinato	4	7^{8}	6^{5}	4
(Australia) A de Minaur	6	6^{6}	7^{7}	6
(France) P-H Herbert	6	6	6
(Germany) M Zverev	4	3	4
(Canada) V Pospisil	4	6	2	3
(Kazakhstan) M Kukushkin	6	3	6	6
(Israel) D Sela	3	3	2
2	(Spain) R Nadal	6	6	6

Second round
14	(Argentina) D Schwartzman	3	4	6^{3}
(Czech Republic) J Veselý	6	6	7^{7}
LL	(Italy) S Bolelli	3	4	1
19	(Italy) F Fognini	6	6	6
(Australia) A de Minaur	6	6^{8}	7	6
(France) P-H Herbert	2	7^{10}	5	3
(Kazakhstan) M Kukushkin	4	3	4
2	(Spain) R Nadal	6	6	6

Third round
(Czech Republic) J Veselý	7^{7}	3	6	6
19	(Italy) F Fognini	6^{4}	6	3	2
(Australia) A de Minaur	1	2	4
2	(Spain) R Nadal	6	6	6

Fourth round
(Czech Republic) J Veselý	3	3	4
2	(Spain) R Nadal	6	6	6

== Semifinal matches statistics ==
=== Anderson vs Isner ===
Category	Anderson	Isner
Aces	49	53
Double faults	4	6
1st serve % in	71.22%	74.91%
Winning % on 1st Serve	83.84%	78.44%
Winning % on 2nd Serve	58.75%	47.95%
Net points won	32–18	76–33
Break points won	4–7	2–3
Receiving points won	79–212	61–217
Winners	118	129
Unforced errors	24	59
Winners-UFE	+94	+70
Total points won	298	271
Total games won	50	46

Source: https://www.tennis24.com/match/ULwfNAlC/#/match-summary/match-statistics/0

=== Djokovic vs Nadal ===
Category	Djokovic	Nadal
Aces	23	9
Double faults	4	4
1st serve % in	71.02%	71.43%
Winning % on 1st Serve	76%	66.67%
Winning % on 2nd Serve	47.06%	56.67%
Net points won	30–14	37–13
Break points won	4–15	4–7
Receiving points won	76–134	57–119
Winners	73	73
Unforced errors	42	42
Winners-UFE	+31	+31
Total points won	195	191
Total games won	28	30

Source: https://www.tennis24.com/match/2RswpYeP/#/match-summary/match-statistics/0

Preceded by 2018 French Open – Men's singles	Grand Slam men's singles	Succeeded by 2018 US Open – Men's singles
