= 2015 Wimbledon Championships – Men's singles qualifying =

Men's singles qualifying
- 2015 Wimbledon Championships

Events
| Singles | men | women | | boys | girls |
| Doubles | men | women | mixed | boys | girls |
| WC Singles | men | women | quad |
| WC Doubles | men | women | quad |
| Legends | men | women | seniors |

Qualification
| Singles | men | women |
| Doubles | men | women |
- Wimbledon Championships

Players and pairs who neither have high enough rankings nor receive wild cards may participate in a qualifying tournament held one week before the annual Wimbledon Tennis Championships.

In 2015, the qualifiers were: Vincent Millot, Alejandro Falla, Elias Ymer, Hiroki Moriya, Luke Saville, Igor Sijsling, Pierre-Hugues Herbert, Yūichi Sugita, Nikoloz Basilashvili, John-Patrick Smith, Michael Berrer, Dustin Brown, Aleksandr Nedovyesov, Horacio Zeballos, John Millman and Kenny de Schepper.

Luca Vanni received as a Lucky loser as a replacement of David Ferrer, who was originally placed in the main draw before the start of the tournament, but withdrew due to an elbow injury before the tournament began.

== Seeds ==
1. (Belgium) Kimmer Coppejans (first round)
2. (Russia) Andrey Kuznetsov (second round)
3. (Argentina) Guido Pella (qualifying competition)
4. (Japan) Tatsuma Ito (second round)
5. (Italy) Luca Vanni (qualifying competition, lucky loser)
6. (Austria) Jürgen Melzer (second round)
7. (Spain) Daniel Muñoz de la Nava (first round)
8. (Germany) Matthias Bachinger (second round)
9. (Argentina) Máximo González (first round)
10. (Colombia) Alejandro González (first round)
11. (Spain) Adrián Menéndez-Maceiras (qualifying competition)
12. (Germany) Dustin Brown (qualified)
13. (United States) Austin Krajicek (first round)
14. (Croatia) Ivan Dodig (qualifying competition)
15. (Australia) John Millman (qualified)
16. (Moldova) Radu Albot (first round)
17. (Kazakhstan) Aleksandr Nedovyesov (qualified)
18. (United States) Bjorn Fratangelo (second round)
19. (Japan) Taro Daniel (first round)
20. (Netherlands) Thiemo de Bakker (second round)
21. (Spain) Albert Montañés (first round)
22. (Slovakia) Norbert Gombos (first round)
23. (France) Paul-Henri Mathieu (qualifying competition)
24. (United States) Ryan Harrison (first round)
25. (Sweden) Elias Ymer (qualified)
26. (Uzbekistan) Farrukh Dustov (second round)
27. (Argentina) Horacio Zeballos (qualified)
28. (France) Édouard Roger-Vasselin (qualifying competition)
29. (Argentina) Facundo Argüello (second round)
30. (Brazil) André Ghem (first round)
31. (Germany) Michael Berrer (qualified)
32. (Poland) Michał Przysiężny (second round)

== Qualifiers ==
1. (France) Vincent Millot
2. (Colombia) Alejandro Falla
3. (Sweden) Elias Ymer
4. (Japan) Hiroki Moriya
5. (Australia) Luke Saville
6. (Netherlands) Igor Sijsling
7. (France) Pierre-Hugues Herbert
8. (Japan) Yūichi Sugita
9. (Georgia (country)) Nikoloz Basilashvili
10. (Australia) John-Patrick Smith
11. (Germany) Michael Berrer
12. (Germany) Dustin Brown
13. (Kazakhstan) Aleksandr Nedovyesov
14. (Argentina) Horacio Zeballos
15. (Australia) John Millman
16. (France) Kenny de Schepper

== Lucky losers ==
1. (Italy) Luca Vanni

== Qualifying draw ==
Key

- Q = Qualifier
- WC = Wild card
- LL = Lucky loser
- Alt = Alternate
- ITF = ITF entry
- PR = Protected ranking
- SR = Special ranking
- SE = Special exempt
- JE = Junior exempt
- JR = Junior Accelerator Programme entrant
- CO = College Accelerator Programme entrant
- NG = Next Gen Accelerator Program entrant
- w/o = Walkover
- r = Retired
- d = Defaulted

=== First qualifier ===
First round
1 | (Belgium) Kimmer Coppejans | 3 | 6 | 3
(France) Vincent Millot | 6 | 2 | 6
(Romania) Marius Copil | 6 | 7^{7}
(Chinese Taipei) Jason Jung | 3 | 6^{4}
(United States) Jarmere Jenkins | 6^{2} | 2
(Russia) Evgeny Donskoy | 7^{7} | 6
(Slovakia) Andrej Martin | 3 | 7 | 7
28 | (France) Édouard Roger-Vasselin | 6 | 5 | 9

Second round
(France) Vincent Millot | 4 | 6 | 9
(Romania) Marius Copil | 6 | 2 | 7
(Russia) Evgeny Donskoy | 5 | 4
28 | (France) Édouard Roger-Vasselin | 7 | 6

Qualifying competition
(France) Vincent Millot | 6 | 6 | 4 | 6
28 | (France) Édouard Roger-Vasselin | 3 | 1 | 6 | 2

=== Second qualifier ===
First round
2 | (Russia) Andrey Kuznetsov | 6 | 3
WC | (United Kingdom) Richard Gabb | 2 | 0^{r}
(Czech Republic) Adam Pavlásek | 3 | 3
(Germany) Andreas Beck | 6 | 6
(Republic of Ireland) James McGee | 7^{7} | 4 | 3
(Germany) Tobias Kamke | 6^{4} | 6 | 6
(Colombia) Alejandro Falla | 6 | 4 | 6
19 | (Japan) Taro Daniel | 2 | 6 | 1

Second round
2 | (Russia) Andrey Kuznetsov | 6^{5} | 4
(Germany) Andreas Beck | 7^{7} | 6
(Germany) Tobias Kamke | 6^{10} | 3
(Colombia) Alejandro Falla | 7^{12} | 6

Qualifying competition
(Germany) Andreas Beck | 7 | 6^{5} | 6^{4} | 6^{6}
(Colombia) Alejandro Falla | 5 | 7^{7} | 7^{7} | 7^{8}

=== Third qualifier ===
First round
3 | (Argentina) Guido Pella | 6 | 4 | 6
(Italy) Roberto Marcora | 4 | 6 | 3
(Chinese Taipei) Yang Tsung-hua | 1 | 5
(China) Zhang Ze | 6 | 7
(Brazil) Guilherme Clezar | 5 | 4
(Netherlands) Boy Westerhof | 7 | 6
(Italy) Thomas Fabbiano | 6 | 3 | 4
25 | (Sweden) Elias Ymer | 4 | 6 | 6

Second round
3 | (Argentina) Guido Pella | 7^{7} | 7^{7}
(China) Zhang Ze | 6^{5} | 6^{4}
(Netherlands) Boy Westerhof | 6^{8} | 5
25 | (Sweden) Elias Ymer | 7^{10} | 7

Qualifying competition
3 | (Argentina) Guido Pella | 1 | 6^{3} | 7^{7} | 6^{4}
25 | (Sweden) Elias Ymer | 6 | 7^{7} | 6^{4} | 7^{7}

=== Fourth qualifier ===
First round
4 | (Japan) Tatsuma Ito | 7 | 4 | 6
(Ecuador) Giovanni Lapentti | 5 | 6 | 3
(Japan) Hiroki Moriya | 6 | 7^{10}
(Netherlands) Jesse Huta Galung | 2 | 6^{8}
(Italy) Matteo Donati | 7^{7} | 2 | 6
(India) Yuki Bhambri | 6^{5} | 6 | 2
(Japan) Yoshihito Nishioka | 6 | 6
30 | (Brazil) André Ghem | 3 | 0

Second round
4 | (Japan) Tatsuma Ito | 7^{7} | 6^{4} | 5
(Japan) Hiroki Moriya | 6^{4} | 7^{7} | 7
(Italy) Matteo Donati | 4 | 7^{7} | 6
(Japan) Yoshihito Nishioka | 6 | 6^{1} | 2

Qualifying competition
(Japan) Hiroki Moriya | 6 | 6 | 6
(Italy) Matteo Donati | 4 | 3 | 2

=== Fifth qualifier ===
First round
5 | (Italy) Luca Vanni | 6 | 6
(France) Maxime Hamou | 4 | 2
(Russia) Karen Khachanov | 6^{8} | 3
(Russia) Konstantin Kravchuk | 7^{10} | 6
(Chile) Nicolás Jarry | 2 | 4
(Australia) Luke Saville | 6 | 6
PR | (Croatia) Ante Pavić | 4 | 6^{3}
20 | (Netherlands) Thiemo de Bakker | 6 | 7^{7}

Second round
5 | (Italy) Luca Vanni | 7^{7} | 6
(Russia) Konstantin Kravchuk | 6^{5} | 3
(Australia) Luke Saville | 6 | 6
20 | (Netherlands) Thiemo de Bakker | 4 | 4

Qualifying competition
5 | (Italy) Luca Vanni | 6 | 6 | 3 | 6^{7} | 4
(Australia) Luke Saville | 4 | 4 | 6 | 7^{9} | 6

=== Sixth qualifier ===
First round
6 | (Austria) Jürgen Melzer | 6 | 6
(Austria) Gerald Melzer | 1 | 4
(Spain) Roberto Carballés Baena | 4 | 7 | 3
(Netherlands) Igor Sijsling | 6 | 5 | 6
PR | (Germany) Julian Reister | 6 | 6
(Argentina) Nicolás Kicker | 3 | 1
(United States) Dennis Novikov | 2 | 6 | 3
23 | (France) Paul-Henri Mathieu | 6 | 2 | 6

Second round
6 | (Austria) Jürgen Melzer | 6 | 5 | 3
(Netherlands) Igor Sijsling | 1 | 7 | 6
PR | (Germany) Julian Reister | 1 | 6^{3}
23 | (France) Paul-Henri Mathieu | 6 | 7^{7}

Qualifying competition
(Netherlands) Igor Sijsling | 6 | 7^{7} | 2 | 5 | 7
23 | (France) Paul-Henri Mathieu | 4 | 6^{3} | 6 | 7 | 5

=== Seventh qualifier ===
First round
7 | (Spain) Daniel Muñoz de la Nava | 3 | 1
(United Kingdom) Edward Corrie | 6 | 6
(Spain) Iñigo Cervantes | 5 | 6 | 6
(India) Somdev Devvarman | 7 | 4 | 2
(France) Pierre-Hugues Herbert | 6 | 6
(Chile) Hans Podlipnik-Castillo | 3 | 2
(France) Gianni Mina | 3 | 7 | 6
29 | (Argentina) Facundo Argüello | 6 | 5 | 8

Second round
(United Kingdom) Edward Corrie | 3 | 5
(Spain) Iñigo Cervantes | 6 | 7
(France) Pierre-Hugues Herbert | 6 | 6
29 | (Argentina) Facundo Argüello | 3 | 4

Qualifying competition
(Spain) Iñigo Cervantes | 6 | 4 | 3 | 7 | 5
(France) Pierre-Hugues Herbert | 4 | 6 | 6 | 5 | 7

=== Eighth qualifier ===
First round
8 | (Germany) Matthias Bachinger | 6 | 6
WC | (United Kingdom) Daniel Cox | 3 | 3
WC | (United Kingdom) Daniel Evans | 7^{7} | 7^{7}
(Czech Republic) Jaroslav Pospíšil | 6^{5} | 6^{2}
WC | (United Kingdom) Alexander Ward | 3 | 2
(Japan) Yūichi Sugita | 6 | 6
(Belgium) Germain Gigounon | 3 | 6 | 7
32 | (Poland) Michał Przysiężny | 6 | 3 | 9

Second round
8 | (Germany) Matthias Bachinger | 4 | 6 | 5
WC | (United Kingdom) Daniel Evans | 6 | 0 | 7
(Japan) Yūichi Sugita | 4 | 6 | 6
32 | (Poland) Michał Przysiężny | 6 | 4 | 2

Qualifying competition
WC | (United Kingdom) Daniel Evans | 6^{6} | 2 | 5
(Japan) Yūichi Sugita | 7^{8} | 6 | 7

=== Ninth qualifier ===
First round
9 | (Argentina) Máximo González | 5 | 2
(Hungary) Márton Fucsovics | 7 | 6
(France) Rémi Boutillier | 7^{7} | 4 | 0
(Australia) Benjamin Mitchell | 6^{5} | 6 | 6
(Georgia (country)) Nikoloz Basilashvili | 6 | 6
(Romania) Victor Hănescu | 4 | 2
WC | (United Kingdom) Richard Bloomfield | 6 | 2 | 1
26 | (Uzbekistan) Farrukh Dustov | 4 | 6 | 6

Second round
(Hungary) Márton Fucsovics | 6 | 3 | 6
(Australia) Benjamin Mitchell | 3 | 6 | 2
(Georgia (country)) Nikoloz Basilashvili | 6 | 6
26 | (Uzbekistan) Farrukh Dustov | 3 | 3

Qualifying competition
(Hungary) Márton Fucsovics | 4 | 4 | 6 | 2
(Georgia (country)) Nikoloz Basilashvili | 6 | 6 | 3 | 6

=== Tenth qualifier ===
First round
10 | (Colombia) Alejandro González | 1 | 4
(Italy) Matteo Viola | 6 | 6
(Czech Republic) Jan Mertl | 3 | 7 | 15
(Dominican Republic) José Hernández-Fernández | 6 | 5 | 13
(Belgium) Maxime Authom | 6^{5} | 7^{7} | 2
(Australia) John-Patrick Smith | 7^{7} | 6^{3} | 6
PR | (Israel) Amir Weintraub | 4 | 5
18 | (United States) Bjorn Fratangelo | 6 | 7

Second round
(Italy) Matteo Viola | 4 | 6^{3}
(Czech Republic) Jan Mertl | 6 | 7^{7}
(Australia) John-Patrick Smith | 7^{7} | 6
18 | (United States) Bjorn Fratangelo | 6^{5} | 4

Qualifying competition
(Czech Republic) Jan Mertl | 1 | 5 | 2
(Australia) John-Patrick Smith | 6 | 7 | 6

=== Eleventh qualifier ===
First round
11 | (Spain) Adrián Menéndez-Maceiras | 6 | 6
(Germany) Tim Pütz | 3 | 2
(Chinese Taipei) Jimmy Wang | 4 | 6 | 7
(Argentina) Pedro Cachin | 6 | 3 | 5
WC | (United Kingdom) Joshua Milton | 3 | 6 | 6
(Czech Republic) Jan Hernych | 6 | 3 | 4
(Canada) Frank Dancevic | 6^{4} | 6 | 3
31 | (Germany) Michael Berrer | 7^{7} | 3 | 6

Second round
11 | (Spain) Adrián Menéndez-Maceiras | 6^{4} | 6 | 6
(Chinese Taipei) Jimmy Wang | 7^{7} | 3 | 4
WC | (United Kingdom) Joshua Milton | 1 | 6 | 4
31 | (Germany) Michael Berrer | 6 | 2 | 6

Qualifying competition
11 | (Spain) Adrián Menéndez-Maceiras | 7^{17} | 4 | 1 | 6 | 4
31 | (Germany) Michael Berrer | 6^{15} | 6 | 6 | 1 | 6

=== Twelfth qualifier ===
First round
12 | (Germany) Dustin Brown | 6 | 6
(Romania) Adrian Ungur | 1 | 2
(Bosnia and Herzegovina) Aldin Šetkić | 6^{5} | 6 | 7
(Russia) Aslan Karatsev | 7^{7} | 4 | 9
(Argentina) Renzo Olivo | 4 | 6^{4}
(Italy) Andrea Arnaboldi | 6 | 7^{7}
(Argentina) Guido Andreozzi | 7^{7} | 4 | 6
24 | (United States) Ryan Harrison | 6^{4} | 6 | 4

Second round
12 | (Germany) Dustin Brown | 7^{11} | 6
(Russia) Aslan Karatsev | 6^{9} | 4
(Italy) Andrea Arnaboldi | 7 | 7^{7}
(Argentina) Guido Andreozzi | 5 | 6^{2}

Qualifying competition
12 | (Germany) Dustin Brown | 7^{7} | 6 | 6
(Italy) Andrea Arnaboldi | 6^{1} | 3 | 4

=== Thirteenth qualifier ===
First round
13 | (United States) Austin Krajicek | 4 | 6 | 5
(Belgium) Yannick Mertens | 6 | 2 | 7
(Russia) Alexander Kudryavtsev | 3 | 4
(France) Mathias Bourgue | 6 | 6
(Australia) Jason Kubler | 6 | 6
(Portugal) Rui Machado | 3 | 4
(Bosnia and Herzegovina) Mirza Bašić | 1 | 2
17 | (Kazakhstan) Aleksandr Nedovyesov | 6 | 6

Second round
(Belgium) Yannick Mertens | 6^{4} | 6 | 6
(France) Mathias Bourgue | 7^{7} | 3 | 2
(Australia) Jason Kubler | 6 | 3 | 4
17 | (Kazakhstan) Aleksandr Nedovyesov | 3 | 6 | 6

Qualifying competition
(Belgium) Yannick Mertens | 6^{7} | 3 | 4
17 | (Kazakhstan) Aleksandr Nedovyesov | 7^{9} | 6 | 6

=== Fourteenth qualifier ===
First round
14 | (Croatia) Ivan Dodig | 6 | 6
(United States) Jared Donaldson | 3 | 2
(Slovakia) Jozef Kovalík | 4 | 6 | 3
(Russia) Andrey Rublev | 6 | 3 | 6
PR | (Portugal) Pedro Sousa | 3 | 6 | 1
(Portugal) Gastão Elias | 6 | 3 | 6
(Spain) Pere Riba | 7^{7} | 4 | 4
27 | (Argentina) Horacio Zeballos | 6^{4} | 6 | 6

Second round
14 | (Croatia) Ivan Dodig | 4 | 6 | 6
(Russia) Andrey Rublev | 6 | 4 | 4
(Portugal) Gastão Elias | 1 | 7^{7} | 5
27 | (Argentina) Horacio Zeballos | 6 | 6^{3} | 7

Qualifying competition
14 | (Croatia) Ivan Dodig | 7^{7} | 6^{5} | 4 | 6^{1}
27 | (Argentina) Horacio Zeballos | 6^{4} | 7^{7} | 6 | 7^{7}

=== Fifteenth qualifier ===
First round
15 | (Australia) John Millman | 6 | 6
(Sweden) Christian Lindell | 3 | 2
(United States) Chase Buchanan | 6 | 2^{r}
(France) Tristan Lamasine | 1 | 1
(France) Enzo Couacaud | 6 | 6
(Belgium) Niels Desein | 4 | 4
PR | (Switzerland) Marco Chiudinelli | 6 | 4 | 10
21 | (Spain) Albert Montañés | 3 | 6 | 8

Second round
15 | (Australia) John Millman | 4 | 6 | 6
(France) Tristan Lamasine | 6 | 1 | 4
(France) Enzo Couacaud | 7^{11} | 6
PR | (Switzerland) Marco Chiudinelli | 6^{9} | 3

Qualifying competition
15 | (Australia) John Millman | 1 | 6 | 6 | 6
(France) Enzo Couacaud | 6 | 3 | 3 | 2

=== Sixteenth qualifier ===
First round
16 | (Moldova) Radu Albot | 6^{4} | 4
(France) Kenny de Schepper | 7^{7} | 6
(Germany) Peter Gojowczyk | 6^{8} | 4
(India) Saketh Myneni | 7^{10} | 6
(Chinese Taipei) Chen Ti | 2 | 3
(Estonia) Jürgen Zopp | 6 | 6
PR | (France) Stéphane Robert | 6 | 7
22 | (Slovakia) Norbert Gombos | 3 | 5

Second round
(France) Kenny de Schepper | 7^{7} | 3 | 9
(India) Saketh Myneni | 6^{5} | 6 | 7
(Estonia) Jürgen Zopp | 6^{5} | 6 | 3
PR | (France) Stéphane Robert | 7^{7} | 4 | 6

Qualifying competition
(France) Kenny de Schepper | 3 | 6 | 3 | 6 | 6
PR | (France) Stéphane Robert | 6 | 2 | 6 | 3 | 4
