= 2015 Wimbledon Championships – Women's doubles qualifying =

Women's doubles qualifying
- 2015 Wimbledon Championships

Events
Singles	men	women		boys	girls
Doubles	men	women	mixed	boys	girls
WC Singles	men	women	quad
WC Doubles	men	women	quad
Legends	men	women	seniors

Qualification
Singles	men	women
Doubles	men	women
- Wimbledon Championships

== Seeds ==
1. (Georgia (country)) Oksana Kalashnikova / (Germany) Laura Siegemund (first round)
2. (Sweden) Johanna Larsson/ (Croatia) Petra Martić (qualified)
3. (Chinese Taipei) Chan Chin-wei / (United States) Nicole Melichar (qualifying competition, Lucky losers)
4. (Poland) Magda Linette / (Luxembourg) Mandy Minella (qualified)
5. (China) Han Xinyun / (Japan) Junri Namigata (first round)
6. (China) Wang Yafan / (China) Zhang Kailin (qualified)
7. (Czech Republic) Barbora Krejčíková / (Israel) Shahar Pe'er (first round)
8. (Ukraine) Yuliya Beygelzimer / (United States) Anna Tatishvili (first round)

== Qualifiers ==
1. (Russia) Elizaveta Kulichkova / (Russia) Evgeniya Rodina
2. (Sweden) Johanna Larsson / (Croatia) Petra Martić
3. (China) Wang Yafan / (China) Zhang Kailin
4. (Poland) Magda Linette / (Luxembourg) Mandy Minella

== Lucky losers ==
1. (Chinese Taipei) Chan Chin-wei / (United States) Nicole Melichar
2. (Japan) Misaki Doi / (Liechtenstein) Stephanie Vogt
3. (Slovakia) Jana Čepelová / (Switzerland) Stefanie Vögele

== Qualifying draw ==
=== First qualifier ===
First round
1	(Georgia (country)) Oksana Kalashnikova (Germany) Laura Siegemund	3	6	2
(Japan) Misaki Doi (Liechtenstein) Stephanie Vogt	6	1	6
(Russia) Elizaveta Kulichkova (Russia) Evgeniya Rodina	6	4	6
5	(China) Han Xinyun (Japan) Junri Namigata	4	6	3

Qualifying competition
(Japan) Misaki Doi (Liechtenstein) Stephanie Vogt	6	3	5
(Russia) Elizaveta Kulichkova (Russia) Evgeniya Rodina	4	6	7

=== Second qualifier ===
First round
2	(Sweden) Johanna Larsson (Croatia) Petra Martić	5	6	6
WC	(United Kingdom) Tara Moore (United Kingdom) Nicola Slater	7	4	2
(Germany) Annika Beck (Germany) Anna-Lena Friedsam	6	6
8	(Ukraine) Yuliya Beygelzimer (United States) Anna Tatishvili	3	3

Qualifying competition
2	(Sweden) Johanna Larsson (Croatia) Petra Martić	6	6
(Germany) Annika Beck (Germany) Anna-Lena Friedsam	4	2

=== Third qualifier ===
First round
3	(Chinese Taipei) Chan Chin-wei (United States) Nicole Melichar	6	6
(Montenegro) Danka Kovinić (Brazil) Teliana Pereira	4	1
(United States) Nicole Gibbs (Czech Republic) Eva Hrdinová	4	6	4
6	(China) Wang Yafan (China) Zhang Kailin	6	1	6

Qualifying competition
3	(Chinese Taipei) Chan Chin-wei (United States) Nicole Melichar	5	4
6	(China) Wang Yafan (China) Zhang Kailin	7	6

=== Fourth qualifier ===
First round
4	(Poland) Magda Linette (Luxembourg) Mandy Minella	6	6
WC	(United Kingdom) Harriet Dart (United Kingdom) Katy Dunne	1	3
(Slovakia) Jana Čepelová (Switzerland) Stefanie Vögele	6	6
7	(Czech Republic) Barbora Krejčíková (Israel) Shahar Pe'er	2	3

Qualifying competition
4	(Poland) Magda Linette (Luxembourg) Mandy Minella	2	6	7
(Slovakia) Jana Čepelová (Switzerland) Stefanie Vögele	6	2	5
