= 2015 Wimbledon Championships – Men's doubles qualifying =

Event in tennis tournament

Men's doubles qualifying
- 2015 Wimbledon Championships

Events
Singles	men	women		boys	girls
Doubles	men	women	mixed	boys	girls
WC Singles	men	women	quad
WC Doubles	men	women	quad
Legends	men	women	seniors

Qualification
Singles	men	women
Doubles	men	women
- Wimbledon Championships

In the qualifying event at the men's doubles competition at the 2015 Wimbledon tennis championships, four qualifying pairs and two "lucky loser" pairs were selected to proceed to the main event.

== Seeds ==
1. (New Zealand) Marcus Daniell / (Brazil) Marcelo Demoliner (qualifying competition, lucky losers)
2. (Sweden) Johan Brunström / (Germany) Frank Moser (first round)
3. (Poland) Mateusz Kowalczyk / (Slovakia) Igor Zelenay (qualified)
4. (Germany) Martin Emmrich / (Sweden) Andreas Siljeström (first round)
5. (Belarus) Sergey Betov / (Belarus) Alexander Bury (qualified)
6. (Germany) Gero Kretschmer / (Germany) Alexander Satschko (qualifying competition, lucky losers)
7. (Israel) Jonathan Erlich / (Germany) Philipp Petzschner (qualified)
8. (France) Fabrice Martin / (India) Purav Raja (qualified)

== Qualifiers ==
1. (Belarus) Sergey Betov / (Belarus) Alexander Bury
2. (Israel) Jonathan Erlich / (Germany) Philipp Petzschner
3. (Poland) Mateusz Kowalczyk / (Slovakia) Igor Zelenay
4. (France) Fabrice Martin / (India) Purav Raja

== Lucky losers ==
1. (New Zealand) Marcus Daniell / (Brazil) Marcelo Demoliner
2. (Germany) Gero Kretschmer / (Germany) Alexander Satschko

== Qualifying draw ==
=== First qualifier ===
First round
1	(New Zealand) Marcus Daniell (Brazil) Marcelo Demoliner	6	6
(Lithuania) Ričardas Berankis (United States) James Cerretani	4	1
(Argentina) Andrés Molteni (Chile) Hans Podlipnik-Castillo	6^{2}	6^{7}
5	(Belarus) Sergey Betov (Belarus) Alexander Bury	7^{7}	7^{9}

Qualifying competition
1	(New Zealand) Marcus Daniell (Brazil) Marcelo Demoliner	4	6^{3}
5	(Belarus) Sergey Betov (Belarus) Alexander Bury	6	7^{7}

=== Second qualifier ===
First round
2	(Sweden) Johan Brunström (Germany) Frank Moser	6	6^{2}	11
WC	(United Kingdom) Sean Thornley (United Kingdom) Darren Walsh	4	7^{7}	13
(Netherlands) Wesley Koolhof (Netherlands) Matwé Middelkoop	3	6^{3}
7	(Israel) Jonathan Erlich (Germany) Philipp Petzschner	6	7^{7}

Qualifying competition
WC	(United Kingdom) Sean Thornley (United Kingdom) Darren Walsh	3	3
7	(Israel) Jonathan Erlich (Germany) Philipp Petzschner	6	6

=== Third qualifier ===
First round
3	(Poland) Mateusz Kowalczyk (Slovakia) Igor Zelenay	7	7^{9}
WC	(United Kingdom) Brydan Klein (United Kingdom) David Rice	5	6^{7}
(Germany) Matthias Bachinger (Germany) Dominik Meffert	2	4
6	(Germany) Gero Kretschmer (Germany) Alexander Satschko	6	6

Qualifying competition
3	(Poland) Mateusz Kowalczyk (Slovakia) Igor Zelenay	6	6
6	(Germany) Gero Kretschmer (Germany) Alexander Satschko	4	4

=== Fourth qualifier ===
First round
4	(Germany) Martin Emmrich (Sweden) Andreas Siljeström	4	4
(Mexico) Miguel Ángel Reyes-Varela (India) Divij Sharan	6	6
(Italy) Alessandro Motti (France) Stéphane Robert	3	2
8	(France) Fabrice Martin (India) Purav Raja	6	6

Qualifying competition
(Mexico) Miguel Ángel Reyes-Varela (India) Divij Sharan	6	3	4
8	(France) Fabrice Martin (India) Purav Raja	3	6	6
