= 2015 Wimbledon Championships – Women's singles qualifying =

Women's singles qualifying
- 2015 Wimbledon Championships

Events
Singles	men	women		boys	girls
Doubles	men	women	mixed	boys	girls
WC Singles	men	women	quad
WC Doubles	men	women	quad
Legends	men	women	seniors

Qualification
Singles	men	women
Doubles	men	women
- Wimbledon Championships

Players and pairs who neither have high enough rankings nor receive wild cards may participate in a qualifying tournament held one week before the annual Wimbledon Tennis Championships.

In 2015, the qualifiers were: Laura Siegemund, Aliaksandra Sasnovich, Xu Yifan, Sachia Vickery, Margarita Gasparyan, Richèl Hogenkamp, Olga Govortsova, Duan Yingying, Tamira Paszek, Petra Cetkovská, Bethanie Mattek-Sands and Hsieh Su-wei.

This was the first Grand Slam appearance for Grand Slam champion Naomi Osaka of Japan.

== Seeds ==
1. (Spain) Lourdes Domínguez Lino (second round)
2. (Belgium) An-Sophie Mestach (second round)
3. (United States) Louisa Chirico (qualifying competition)
4. (United States) Sachia Vickery (qualified)
5. (Russia) Margarita Gasparyan (qualified)
6. (Russia) Alla Kudryavtseva (first round)
7. (Belarus) Olga Govortsova (qualified)
8. (China) Duan Yingying (qualified)
9. (Slovakia) Kristína Kučová (first round)
10. (Ukraine) Kateryna Bondarenko (second round)
11. (Israel) Shahar Pe'er (qualifying competition)
12. (Thailand) Luksika Kumkhum (qualifying competition)
13. (Netherlands) Richèl Hogenkamp (qualified)
14. (Chinese Taipei) Hsieh Su-wei (qualified)
15. (Croatia) Donna Vekić (second round)
16. (China) Wang Yafan (qualifying competition)
17. (Poland) Paula Kania (first round)
18. (United States) Anna Tatishvili (qualifying competition)
19. (France) Océane Dodin (first round)
20. (Germany) Laura Siegemund (qualified)
21. (Portugal) Michelle Larcher de Brito (second round)
22. (Belarus) Aliaksandra Sasnovich (qualified)
23. (Ukraine) Maryna Zanevska (first round)
24. (United States) Grace Min (second round)

== Qualifiers ==
1. (Germany) Laura Siegemund
2. (Belarus) Aliaksandra Sasnovich
3. (China) Xu Yifan
4. (United States) Sachia Vickery
5. (Russia) Margarita Gasparyan
6. (Netherlands) Richèl Hogenkamp
7. (Belarus) Olga Govortsova
8. (China) Duan Yingying
9. (Austria) Tamira Paszek
10. (Czech Republic) Petra Cetkovská
11. (United States) Bethanie Mattek-Sands
12. (Chinese Taipei) Hsieh Su-wei

== Qualifying draw ==
=== First qualifier ===
First round
1	(Spain) Lourdes Domínguez Lino	7	6
(Romania) Ana Bogdan	5	3
(Luxembourg) Mandy Minella	6	6
WC	(United Kingdom) Amanda Carreras	2	3
(France) Julie Coin	2	7^{7}	6
(Netherlands) Lesley Kerkhove	6	6^{1}	4
(Japan) Hiroko Kuwata	7^{11}	2	2
20	(Germany) Laura Siegemund	6^{9}	6	6

Second round
1	(Spain) Lourdes Domínguez Lino	6^{3}	2
(Luxembourg) Mandy Minella	7^{7}	6
(France) Julie Coin	2	1
20	(Germany) Laura Siegemund	6	6

Qualifying competition
(Luxembourg) Mandy Minella	4	3
20	(Germany) Laura Siegemund	6	6

=== Second qualifier ===
First round
2	(Belgium) An-Sophie Mestach	6	6
(Australia) Anastasia Rodionova	3	2
(China) Zhang Shuai	6	6
(China) Zhang Kailin	4	4
WC	(United Kingdom) Tara Moore	6	6
WC	(United Kingdom) Gabriella Taylor	2	1
(Netherlands) Cindy Burger	5	6^{2}
22	(Belarus) Aliaksandra Sasnovich	7	7^{7}

Second round
2	(Belgium) An-Sophie Mestach	7^{7}	4	1
(China) Zhang Shuai	6^{1}	6	6
WC	(United Kingdom) Tara Moore	6	2	3
22	(Belarus) Aliaksandra Sasnovich	2	6	6

Qualifying competition
(China) Zhang Shuai	6	2	4
22	(Belarus) Aliaksandra Sasnovich	1	6	6

=== Third qualifier ===
First round
3	(United States) Louisa Chirico	6	6
(Canada) Gabriela Dabrowski	3	2
(Russia) Ekaterina Bychkova	6	6
(United States) Allie Kiick	1	4
(South Korea) Jang Su-jeong	4	6^{5}
(China) Xu Yifan	6	7^{7}
(Russia) Marina Melnikova	6	5	6
23	(Ukraine) Maryna Zanevska	2	7	4

Second round
3	(United States) Louisa Chirico	7^{7}	6
(Russia) Ekaterina Bychkova	6^{1}	2
(China) Xu Yifan	4	6	6
(Russia) Marina Melnikova	6	1	4

Qualifying competition
3	(United States) Louisa Chirico	5	3
(China) Xu Yifan	7	6

=== Fourth qualifier ===
First round
4	(United States) Sachia Vickery	6	6
(Uzbekistan) Nigina Abduraimova	0	1
(Japan) Naomi Osaka	6	1	4
(Romania) Sorana Cîrstea	2	6	6
PR	(United States) Jessica Pegula	6	4
(Israel) Julia Glushko	1	3^{r}
(Belgium) Ysaline Bonaventure	6	3	10
21	(Portugal) Michelle Larcher de Brito	1	6	12

Second round
4	(United States) Sachia Vickery	6^{5}	6	6
(Romania) Sorana Cîrstea	7^{7}	3	4
PR	(United States) Jessica Pegula	1	7^{9}	5
21	(Portugal) Michelle Larcher de Brito	6	6^{7}	4^{r}

Qualifying competition
4	(United States) Sachia Vickery	7	7
PR	(United States) Jessica Pegula	5	5

=== Fifth qualifier ===
First round
5	(Russia) Margarita Gasparyan	6	6
(Italy) Alberta Brianti	2	0
(Bulgaria) Elitsa Kostova	4	6	7
(Romania) Patricia Maria Țig	6	4	5
(Turkey) Çağla Büyükakçay	2	7	4
(Paraguay) Verónica Cepede Royg	6	5	6
(Russia) Alexandra Panova	6	5	11
17	(Poland) Paula Kania	2	7	9

Second round
5	(Russia) Margarita Gasparyan	6	6
(Bulgaria) Elitsa Kostova	2	3
(Paraguay) Verónica Cepede Royg	6	3	6
(Russia) Alexandra Panova	2	6	2

Qualifying competition
5	(Russia) Margarita Gasparyan	6	6
(Paraguay) Verónica Cepede Royg	4	2

=== Sixth qualifier ===
First round
6	(Russia) Alla Kudryavtseva	3	2
(China) Yang Zhaoxuan	6	6
(Spain) Sara Sorribes Tormo	1	6	6
(Japan) Junri Namigata	6	3	4
WC	(United Kingdom) Katy Dunne	7^{7}	3	6
(Ukraine) Anhelina Kalinina	6^{2}	6	2
(Japan) Riko Sawayanagi	2	2
13	(Netherlands) Richèl Hogenkamp	6	6

Second round
(China) Yang Zhaoxuan	6	3	6
(Spain) Sara Sorribes Tormo	3	6	4
WC	(United Kingdom) Katy Dunne	2	5
13	(Netherlands) Richèl Hogenkamp	6	7

Qualifying competition
(China) Yang Zhaoxuan	2	2
13	(Netherlands) Richèl Hogenkamp	6	6

=== Seventh qualifier ===
First round
7	(Belarus) Olga Govortsova	6	7^{7}
(Japan) Kimiko Date-Krumm	4	6^{3}
(Spain) María Teresa Torró Flor	6	1	6
(Thailand) Varatchaya Wongteanchai	3	6	4
(Croatia) Tereza Mrdeža	6^{5}	3
(China) Liu Fangzhou	7^{7}	6
WC	(United Kingdom) Emily Webley-Smith	6	4	3
24	(United States) Grace Min	4	6	6

Second round
7	(Belarus) Olga Govortsova	6	7
(Spain) María Teresa Torró Flor	2	5
(China) Liu Fangzhou	3	6	6
24	(United States) Grace Min	6	1	4

Qualifying competition
7	(Belarus) Olga Govortsova	2	6	6
(China) Liu Fangzhou	6	0	3

=== Eighth qualifier ===
First round
8	(China) Duan Yingying	6	6
(Austria) Patricia Mayr-Achleitner	4	3
(United States) Maria Sanchez	4	6	6
WC	(United Kingdom) Lucy Brown	6	3	2
(Japan) Nao Hibino	6	7
PR	(Japan) Ayumi Morita	1	5
(United States) Alexa Glatch	4	4
18	(United States) Anna Tatishvili	6	6

Second round
8	(China) Duan Yingying	7	6
(United States) Maria Sanchez	5	0
(Japan) Nao Hibino	3	3
18	(United States) Anna Tatishvili	6	6

Qualifying competition
8	(China) Duan Yingying	6	6
18	(United States) Anna Tatishvili	2	4

=== Ninth qualifier ===
First round
9	(Slovakia) Kristína Kučová	3	4
WC	(United Kingdom) Katie Swan	6	6
(Japan) Risa Ozaki	5	2
(Austria) Tamira Paszek	7	6
(Uzbekistan) Akgul Amanmuradova	3	1
(United States) Melanie Oudin	6	6
(Australia) Olivia Rogowska	2	0
16	(China) Wang Yafan	6	6

Second round
WC	(United Kingdom) Katie Swan	3	3
(Austria) Tamira Paszek	6	6
(United States) Melanie Oudin	4	3
16	(China) Wang Yafan	6	6

Qualifying competition
(Austria) Tamira Paszek	6	6^{6}	7
16	(China) Wang Yafan	4	7^{8}	5

=== Tenth qualifier ===
First round
10	(Ukraine) Kateryna Bondarenko	6	6
(Czech Republic) Andrea Hlaváčková	2	0
(Argentina) María Irigoyen	4	1
(Belgium) Elise Mertens	6	6
(Czech Republic) Renata Voráčová	1	1
(Czech Republic) Petra Cetkovská	6	6
(Japan) Misa Eguchi	6^{3}	2
15	(Croatia) Donna Vekić	7^{7}	6

Second round
10	(Ukraine) Kateryna Bondarenko	4	6^{6}
(Belgium) Elise Mertens	6	7^{8}
(Czech Republic) Petra Cetkovská	2	6	6
15	(Croatia) Donna Vekić	6	4	1

Qualifying competition
(Belgium) Elise Mertens	3	2
(Czech Republic) Petra Cetkovská	6	6

=== Eleventh qualifier ===
First round
11	(Israel) Shahar Pe'er	4	6	6
(Ukraine) Yuliya Beygelzimer	6	2	4
(Brazil) Beatriz Haddad Maia	2	1
(Switzerland) Romina Oprandi	6	6
(United States) Bethanie Mattek-Sands	6	6
(Spain) Laura Pous Tió	4	3
(France) Stéphanie Foretz	6	6
19	(France) Océane Dodin	3	2

Second round
11	(Israel) Shahar Pe'er	6	6
(Switzerland) Romina Oprandi	4	0
(United States) Bethanie Mattek-Sands	6	7
(France) Stéphanie Foretz	4	5

Qualifying competition
11	(Israel) Shahar Pe'er	1	4
(United States) Bethanie Mattek-Sands	6	6

=== Twelfth qualifier ===
First round
12	(Thailand) Luksika Kumkhum	6	6
(Czech Republic) Barbora Krejčíková	3	2
(Liechtenstein) Stephanie Vogt	6	6
WC	(United Kingdom) Naomi Cavaday	3	3
(United States) Katerina Stewart	6^{5}	5
(Japan) Eri Hozumi	7^{7}	7
(Croatia) Petra Martić	3	6^{8}
14	(Chinese Taipei) Hsieh Su-wei	6	7^{10}

Second round
12	(Thailand) Luksika Kumkhum	5	7^{7}	6
(Liechtenstein) Stephanie Vogt	7	6^{4}	2
(Japan) Eri Hozumi	2	0
14	(Chinese Taipei) Hsieh Su-wei	6	6

Qualifying competition
12	(Thailand) Luksika Kumkhum	1	7	7
14	(Chinese Taipei) Hsieh Su-wei	6	5	9
