= 2015 Wimbledon Championships – Day-by-day summaries =

The 2015 Wimbledon Championships are described below in detail, in the form of day-by-day summaries.

== Day 1 (29 June) ==
- Seeds out:
  - Men's singles: (Spain) Tommy Robredo [19], (Uruguay) Pablo Cuevas [28]
  - Women's singles: (Spain) Carla Suárez Navarro [9], (Italy) Flavia Pennetta [24], (Czech Republic) Barbora Strýcová [27]
- Schedule of play

Matches on main courts
Matches on Centre Court
Event	Winner	Loser	Score
Gentlemen's singles 1st round	(Serbia) Novak Djokovic [1]	(Germany) Philipp Kohlschreiber	6–4, 6–4, 6–4
Ladies' singles 1st round	(Russia) Maria Sharapova [4]	(United Kingdom) Johanna Konta [WC]	6–2, 6–2
Gentlemen's singles 1st round	(Switzerland) Stan Wawrinka [4]	(Portugal) João Sousa	6–2, 7–5, 7–6^{(7–3)}
Ladies' singles 1st round	(United States) Sloane Stephens	(Czech Republic) Barbora Strýcová [27]	6–4, 6–2
Matches on No. 1 Court
Event	Winner	Loser	Score
Ladies' singles 1st round	(United States) Serena Williams [1]	(Russia) Margarita Gasparyan [Q]	6–4, 6–1
Gentlemen's singles 1st round	(Japan) Kei Nishikori [5]	(Italy) Simone Bolelli	6–3, 6–7^{(4–7)}, 6–2, 3–6, 6–3
Gentlemen's singles 1st round	(Bulgaria) Grigor Dimitrov [11]	(Argentina) Federico Delbonis	6–3, 6–0, 6–4
Matches on No. 2 Court
Event	Winner	Loser	Score
Gentlemen's singles 1st round	(Australia) Nick Kyrgios [26]	(Argentina) Diego Schwartzman	6–0, 6–2, 7–6^{(8–6)}
Gentlemen's singles 1st round	(Finland) Jarkko Nieminen	(Australia) Lleyton Hewitt [WC]	3–6, 6–3, 4–6, 6–0, 11–9
Ladies' singles 1st round	(Czech Republic) Lucie Šafářová [6]	(United States) Alison Riske	3–6, 7–5, 6–3
Matches on No. 3 Court
Event	Winner	Loser	Score
Gentlemen's singles 1st round	(Croatia) Marin Čilić [9]	(Japan) Hiroki Moriya [Q]	6–3, 6–2, 7–6^{(7–4)}
Ladies' singles 1st round	(Serbia) Ana Ivanovic [7]	(China) Xu Yifan [Q]	6–1, 6–1
Gentlemen's singles 1st round	(Canada) Milos Raonic [7]	(Spain) Daniel Gimeno Traver	6–2, 6–3, 3–6, 7–6^{(7–4)}
Ladies' singles 1st round	(United States) Venus Williams [16]	(United States) Madison Brengle	6–0, 6–0
Ladies' singles 1st round	(Colombia) Mariana Duque Mariño	(United Kingdom) Naomi Broady [WC]	7–6^{(7–5)}, 6–3

== Day 2 (30 June) ==
- Seeds out:
  - Men's singles: (Spain) Guillermo García López [29], (United States) Jack Sock [31]
  - Women's singles: (Romania) Simona Halep [3], (Canada) Eugenie Bouchard [12], (France) Caroline Garcia [32]
- Schedule of play

Matches on main courts
Matches on Centre Court
Event	Winner	Loser	Score
Ladies' singles 1st round	(Czech Republic) Petra Kvitová [2]	(Netherlands) Kiki Bertens	6–1, 6–0
Gentlemen's singles 1st round	(Switzerland) Roger Federer [2]	(Bosnia and Herzegovina) Damir Džumhur	6–1, 6–3, 6–3
Gentlemen's singles 1st round	(United Kingdom) Andy Murray [3]	(Kazakhstan) Mikhail Kukushkin	6–4, 7–6^{(7–3)}, 6–4
Ladies' singles 1st round	(Denmark) Caroline Wozniacki [5]	(China) Zheng Saisai	7–5, 6–0
Matches on No. 1 Court
Event	Winner	Loser	Score
Gentlemen's singles 1st round	(Spain) Rafael Nadal [10]	(Brazil) Thomaz Bellucci	6–4, 6–2, 6–4
Ladies' singles 1st round	(Slovakia) Jana Čepelová	(Romania) Simona Halep [3]	5–7, 6–4, 6–3
Gentlemen's singles 1st round	(Czech Republic) Tomáš Berdych [6]	(France) Jérémy Chardy	6–2, 6–7^{(8–10)}, 7–6^{(7–3)}, 7–6^{(7–5)}
Matches on No. 2 Court
Event	Winner	Loser	Score
Gentlemen's singles 1st round	(France) Jo-Wilfried Tsonga [13]	(Luxembourg) Gilles Müller	7–6^{(10–8)}, 6–7^{(3–7)}, 6–4, 3–6, 6–2
Gentlemen's singles 1st round	(France) Gilles Simon [12]	(Spain) Nicolás Almagro	6–4, 6–4, 7–5
Ladies' singles 1st round	(Russia) Ekaterina Makarova [8]	(United States) Sachia Vickery	6–2, 6–4
Matches on No. 3 Court
Event	Winner	Loser	Score
Gentlemen's singles 1st round	(Ukraine) Alexandr Dolgopolov	(United Kingdom) Kyle Edmund [WC]	7–6^{(7–4)}, 6–1, 6–2
Ladies' singles 1st round	(Russia) Evgeniya Rodina	(United Kingdom) Laura Robson [WC]	6–4, 6–4
Ladies' singles 1st round	(China) Duan Yingying	(Canada) Eugenie Bouchard [12]	7–6^{(7–3)}, 6–4
Gentlemen's singles 1st round	(France) Gaël Monfils [18]	(Spain) Pablo Carreño Busta	6–4, 6–4, 7–5

== Day 3 (1 July) ==
- Seeds out:
  - Men's singles: (Japan) Kei Nishikori [5], (Austria) Dominic Thiem [32]
  - Women's singles: (Serbia) Ana Ivanovic [7], (Czech Republic) Karolína Plíšková [11], (Italy) Sara Errani [19]
  - Men's doubles: (Italy) Simone Bolelli / (Italy) Fabio Fognini [5], (Uruguay) Pablo Cuevas / (Spain) David Marrero [12]
  - Women's doubles: (Chinese Taipei) Chan Yung-jan / (China) Zheng Jie [13]
- Schedule of play

Matches on main courts
Matches on Centre Court
Event	Winner	Loser	Score
Gentlemen's singles 2nd round	(Serbia) Novak Djokovic [1]	(Finland) Jarkko Nieminen	6–4, 6–2, 6–3
Gentlemen's singles 2nd round	(Croatia) Marin Čilić [9]	(Lithuania) Ričardas Berankis	6–3, 4–6, 7–6^{(8–6)}, 4–6, 7–5
Ladies' singles 2nd round	(United States) Serena Williams [1]	(Hungary) Tímea Babos	6–4, 6–1
Matches on No. 1 Court
Event	Winner	Loser	Score
Gentlemen's singles 2nd round	(Canada) Milos Raonic [7]	(Germany) Tommy Haas [PR]	6–0, 6–2, 6–7^{(5–7)}, 7–6^{(7–4)}
Ladies' singles 2nd round	(United Kingdom) Heather Watson	(Slovakia) Daniela Hantuchová	6–4, 6–2
Gentlemen's singles 2nd round	(Switzerland) Stan Wawrinka [4]	(Dominican Republic) Víctor Estrella Burgos	6–3, 6–4, 7–5
Matches on No. 2 Court
Event	Winner	Loser	Score
Gentlemen's singles 2nd round	(Bulgaria) Grigor Dimitrov [11]	(United States) Steve Johnson	7–6^{(10–8)}, 6–2, 7–6^{(7–2)}
Ladies' singles 2nd round	(Russia) Maria Sharapova [4]	(Netherlands) Richèl Hogenkamp [Q]	6–3, 6–1
Gentlemen's singles 2nd round	(South Africa) Kevin Anderson [14]	(Turkey) Marsel İlhan	6–7^{(5–7)}, 7–6^{(8–6)}, 6–4, 6–4
Ladies' singles 2nd round	(United States) Venus Williams [16]	(Kazakhstan) Yulia Putintseva	7–6^{(7–5)}, 6–4
Matches on No. 3 Court
Event	Winner	Loser	Score
Gentlemen's singles 2nd round	(Belgium) David Goffin [16]	(United Kingdom) Liam Broady [WC]	7–6^{(7–3)}, 6–1, 6–1
Ladies' singles 1st round	(United States) Madison Keys [21]	(Switzerland) Stefanie Vögele	6–7^{(6–8)}, 6–3, 6–4
Gentlemen's singles 2nd round	(Spain) Fernando Verdasco	(Austria) Dominic Thiem [32]	5–7, 6–4, 5–7, 6–3, 6–4
Ladies' singles 2nd round	(United States) Bethanie Mattek-Sands [Q]	(Serbia) Ana Ivanovic [7]	6–3, 6–4
Ladies' doubles 1st round	(Switzerland) Martina Hingis [1] (India) Sania Mirza [1]	(Kazakhstan) Zarina Diyas (China) Zheng Saisai	6–2, 6–2

== Day 4 (2 July) ==
- Seeds out:
  - Men's singles: (Spain) Rafael Nadal [10], (Spain) Feliciano López [15], (Italy) Fabio Fognini [30]
  - Women's singles: (Russia) Ekaterina Makarova [8], (Ukraine) Elina Svitolina [17], (France) Alizé Cornet [25], (Russia) Svetlana Kuznetsova [26]
  - Men's doubles: (Croatia) Marin Draganja / (Finland) Henri Kontinen [15]
  - Women's doubles: (Australia) Anastasia Rodionova / (Australia) Arina Rodionova [15]
- Schedule of play

Matches on main courts
Matches on Centre Court
Event	Winner	Loser	Score
Ladies' singles 2nd round	(Germany) Sabine Lisicki [18]	(United States) Christina McHale	2–6, 7–5, 6–1
Gentlemen's singles 2nd round	(Switzerland) Roger Federer [2]	(United States) Sam Querrey	6–4, 6–2, 6–2
Gentlemen's singles 2nd round	(Germany) Dustin Brown [Q]	(Spain) Rafael Nadal [10]	7–5, 3–6, 6–4, 6–4
Matches on No. 1 Court
Event	Winner	Loser	Score
Gentlemen's singles 2nd round	(United Kingdom) Andy Murray [3]	(Netherlands) Robin Haase	6–1, 6–1, 6–4
Ladies' singles 2nd round	(Czech Republic) Petra Kvitová [2]	(Japan) Kurumi Nara	6–2, 6–0
Gentlemen's singles 2nd round	(France) Jo-Wilfried Tsonga [13]	(Spain) Albert Ramos	6–3, 6–4, 6–4
Ladies' singles 2nd round	(Czech Republic) Kristýna Plíšková	(Russia) Svetlana Kuznetsova [26]	3–6, 6–3, 6–4
Matches on No. 2 Court
Event	Winner	Loser	Score
Gentlemen's singles 2nd round	(United Kingdom) James Ward [WC]	(Czech Republic) Jiří Veselý	6–2, 7–6^{(7–4)}, 3–6, 6–3
Ladies' singles 2nd round	(Poland) Agnieszka Radwańska [13]	(Australia) Ajla Tomljanović	6–0, 6–2
Gentlemen's singles 2nd round	(Czech Republic) Tomáš Berdych [6]	(France) Nicolas Mahut [WC]	6–1, 6–4, 6–4
Ladies' doubles 2nd round	(Chinese Taipei) Chan Hao-ching (Belgium) Alison Van Uytvanck	(United Kingdom) Johanna Konta [WC] (United States) Maria Sanchez [WC]	7–6^{(7–5)}, 6–2
Matches on No. 3 Court
Event	Winner	Loser	Score
Ladies' singles 2nd round	(Slovakia) Magdaléna Rybáriková	(Russia) Ekaterina Makarova [8]	6–2, 7–5
Gentlemen's singles 2nd round	(France) Gilles Simon [12]	(Slovenia) Blaž Kavčič	6–1, 6–1, 6–7^{(5–7)}, 6–1
Gentlemen's singles 2nd round	(France) Gaël Monfils [18]	(France) Adrian Mannarino	7–6^{(7–5)}, 6–3, 7–5
Ladies' doubles 2nd round	(United States) Raquel Kops-Jones [5] (United States) Abigail Spears [5]	(Croatia) Darija Jurak (Croatia) Ana Konjuh	6–3, 6–4

== Day 5 (3 July) ==
- Seeds out:
  - Men's singles: (Canada) Milos Raonic [7], (Bulgaria) Grigor Dimitrov [11], (Argentina) Leonardo Mayer [24], (Australia) Bernard Tomic [27]
  - Women's singles: (Germany) Andrea Petkovic [14], (Australia) Samantha Stosur [22], (Romania) Irina-Camelia Begu [29]
  - Men's doubles: (Spain) Marcel Granollers / (Spain) Marc López [6], (South Africa) Raven Klaasen / (United States) Rajeev Ram [14]
  - Women's doubles: (Spain) Garbiñe Muguruza / (Spain) Carla Suárez Navarro [6]
- Schedule of play

Matches on main courts
Matches on Centre Court
Event	Winner	Loser	Score
Gentlemen's singles 3rd round	(France) Richard Gasquet [21]	(Bulgaria) Grigor Dimitrov [11]	6–3, 6–4, 6–4
Gentlemen's singles 3rd round	(Serbia) Novak Djokovic [1]	(Australia) Bernard Tomic [27]	6–3, 6–3, 6–3
Ladies' singles 3rd round	(United States) Serena Williams [1]	(United Kingdom) Heather Watson	6–2, 4–6, 7–5
Matches on No. 1 Court
Event	Winner	Loser	Score
Gentlemen's singles 3rd round	(Switzerland) Stan Wawrinka [4]	(Spain) Fernando Verdasco	6–4, 6–3, 6–4
Ladies' singles 3rd round	(Russia) Maria Sharapova [4]	(Romania) Irina-Camelia Begu [29]	6–4, 6–3
Matches on No. 2 Court
Event	Winner	Loser	Score
Gentlemen's singles 3rd round	(Australia) Nick Kyrgios [26]	(Canada) Milos Raonic [7]	5–7, 7–5, 7–6^{(7–3)}, 6–3
Ladies' singles 3rd round	(Czech Republic) Lucie Šafářová [6]	(United States) Sloane Stephens	3–6, 6–3, 6–1
Ladies' singles 3rd round	(United States) Venus Williams [16]	(Serbia) Aleksandra Krunić	6–3, 6–2
Mixed doubles – 1st round	(Australia) Ajla Tomljanović (Croatia) Ivan Dodig	(United States) Lisa Raymond [WC] (United Kingdom) Neal Skupski [WC]	7–6^{(7–5)}, 7–6^{(7–4)}
Matches on No. 3 Court
Event	Winner	Loser	Score
Gentlemen's singles 3rd round	(Belgium) David Goffin [16]	(Cyprus) Marcos Baghdatis	6–3, 6–4, 6–2
Ladies' singles 3rd round	(United States) CoCo Vandeweghe	(Australia) Samantha Stosur [22]	6–2, 6–0
Ladies' singles 3rd round	(Belarus) Victoria Azarenka [23]	(France) Kristina Mladenovic	6–4, 6–4
Gentlemen's doubles 2nd round	(United States) Bob Bryan [1] (United States) Mike Bryan [1]	(United States) Steve Johnson (United States) Sam Querrey	6–1, 5–7, 7–6^{(7–3)}, 6–3

== Day 6 (4 July) ==
- Seeds out:
  - Men's singles: (France) Jo-Wilfried Tsonga [13], (United States) John Isner [17], (France) Gaël Monfils [18], (Italy) Andreas Seppi [25]
  - Women's singles: (Czech Republic) Petra Kvitová [2], (Germany) Angelique Kerber [10], (Germany) Sabine Lisicki [18], (Italy) Camila Giorgi [31]
  - Men's doubles: (Colombia) Juan Sebastián Cabal / (Colombia) Robert Farah [16]
  - Women's doubles: (Czech Republic) Andrea Hlaváčková / (Czech Republic) Lucie Hradecká [8], (France) Caroline Garcia / (Slovenia) Katarina Srebotnik [10]
  - Mixed doubles: (United States) Bob Bryan / (France) Caroline Garcia [4], (Netherlands) Jean-Julien Rojer / (Germany) Anna-Lena Grönefeld [11], (Australia) John Peers / (Chinese Taipei) Chan Yung-jan [14]
- Schedule of play

Matches on main courts
Matches on Centre Court
Event	Winner	Loser	Score
Gentlemen's singles 3rd round	(Switzerland) Roger Federer [2]	(Australia) Sam Groth	6–4, 6–4, 6–7^{(5–7)}, 6–2
Ladies' singles 3rd round	(Serbia) Jelena Janković [28]	(Czech Republic) Petra Kvitová [2]	3–6, 7–5, 6–4
Gentlemen's singles 3rd round	(United Kingdom) Andy Murray [3]	(Italy) Andreas Seppi [25]	6–2, 6–2, 1–6, 6–1
Gentlemen's singles 3rd round	(France) Gilles Simon [12]	(France) Gaël Monfils [18]	3–6, 6–3, 7–6^{(8–6)}, 2–6, 6–2 (Note: This match started on No. 1 Court, as planned, but with Monfils leading by 3 games to 2 in the fourth set the match was suspended due to darkness and moved under the Centre Court roof, where it was finished the same day.)
Matches on No. 1 Court
Event	Winner	Loser	Score
Ladies' singles 3rd round	(Denmark) Caroline Wozniacki [5]	(Italy) Camila Giorgi [31]	6–2, 6–2
Gentlemen's singles 3rd round	(Croatia) Marin Čilić [9]	(United States) John Isner [17]	7–6^{(7–4)}, 6–7^{(6–8)}, 6–4, 6–7^{(4–7)}, 12–10
Gentlemen's singles 3rd round	(Canada) Vasek Pospisil	(United Kingdom) James Ward [WC]	6–4, 3–6, 2–6, 6–3, 8–6
Matches on No. 2 Court
Event	Winner	Loser	Score
Ladies' singles 3rd round	(Spain) Garbiñe Muguruza [20]	(Germany) Angelique Kerber [10]	7–6^{(14–12)}, 1–6, 6–2
Ladies' singles 3rd round	(Switzerland) Timea Bacsinszky [15]	(Germany) Sabine Lisicki [18]	6–3, 6–2
Gentlemen's singles 3rd round	(Czech Republic) Tomáš Berdych [6]	(Spain) Pablo Andújar	4–6, 6–0, 6–3, 7–6^{(7–3)}
Mixed doubles – 2nd round	(Switzerland) Martina Hingis [7] (India) Leander Paes [7]	(France) Alizé Cornet (France) Édouard Roger-Vasselin	6–4, 6–2
Matches on No. 3 Court
Event	Winner	Loser	Score
Gentlemen's singles 3rd round	(Serbia) Viktor Troicki [22]	(Germany) Dustin Brown [Q]	6–4, 7–6^{(7–3)}, 4–6, 6–3
Gentlemen's singles 3rd round	(Croatia) Ivo Karlović [23]	(France) Jo-Wilfried Tsonga [13]	7–6^{(7–3)}, 4–6, 7–6^{(7–2)}, 7–6^{(11–9)}
Ladies' doubles 2nd round	(Australia) Casey Dellacqua [9] (Kazakhstan) Yaroslava Shvedova [9]	(Slovakia) Daniela Hantuchová (Australia) Samantha Stosur	6–3, 6–0
Mixed doubles – 1st round	(Ukraine) Olga Savchuk [Alt] (Austria) Oliver Marach [Alt]	(United Kingdom) Heather Watson (Belarus) Max Mirnyi	6–7^{(5–7)}, 7–6^{(7–4)}, 6–4

== Middle Sunday (5 July) ==
Following tradition, Middle Sunday was a day of rest.

== Day 7 (6 July) ==
- Seeds out:
  - Men's singles: (Czech Republic) Tomáš Berdych [6], (Belgium) David Goffin [16], (Spain) Roberto Bautista Agut [20], (Serbia) Viktor Troicki [22], (Croatia) Ivo Karlović [23], (Australia) Nick Kyrgios [26]
  - Women's singles: (Denmark) Caroline Wozniacki [5], (Czech Republic) Lucie Šafářová [6], (United States) Venus Williams [16], (Serbia) Jelena Janković [28], (Switzerland) Belinda Bencic [30]
  - Men's doubles: (Canada) Vasek Pospisil / (United States) Jack Sock [3], (France) Pierre-Hugues Herbert / (France) Nicolas Mahut [10], (Canada) Daniel Nestor / (India) Leander Paes [11]
  - Women's doubles: (Russia) Alla Kudryavtseva / (Russia) Anastasia Pavlyuchenkova [11], (Netherlands) Michaëlla Krajicek / (Czech Republic) Barbora Strýcová [14], (Spain) Anabel Medina Garrigues / (Spain) Arantxa Parra Santonja [16]
  - Mixed doubles: (Romania) Florin Mergea / (Netherlands) Michaëlla Krajicek [13], (China) Zheng Jie / (Finland) Henri Kontinen [15], (Spain) David Marrero / (Spain) Arantxa Parra Santonja [17]
- Schedule of play

Matches on main courts
Matches on Centre Court
Event	Winner	Loser	Score
Ladies' singles 4th round	(United States) Serena Williams [1]	(United States) Venus Williams [16]	6–4, 6–3
Gentlemen's singles 4th round	(United Kingdom) Andy Murray [3]	(Croatia) Ivo Karlović [23]	7–6^{(9–7)}, 6–4, 5–7, 6–4
Gentlemen's singles 4th round	(Switzerland) Roger Federer [2]	(Spain) Roberto Bautista Agut [20]	6–2, 6–2, 6–3
Matches on No. 1 Court
Event	Winner	Loser	Score
Ladies' singles 4th round	(Russia) Maria Sharapova [4]	(Kazakhstan) Zarina Diyas	6–4, 6–4
Gentlemen's singles 4th round	(Switzerland) Stan Wawrinka [4]	(Belgium) David Goffin [16]	7–6^{(7–3)}, 7–6^{(9–7)}, 6–4
Matches on No. 2 Court
Event	Winner	Loser	Score
Gentlemen's singles 4th round	(France) Richard Gasquet [21]	(Australia) Nick Kyrgios [26]	7–5, 6–1, 6–7^{(7–9)}, 7–6^{(8–6)}
Ladies' singles 4th round	(Spain) Garbiñe Muguruza [20]	(Denmark) Caroline Wozniacki [5]	6–4, 6–4
Gentlemen's singles 4th round	(France) Gilles Simon [12]	(Czech Republic) Tomáš Berdych [6]	6–4, 6–4, 6–2
Mixed doubles – 2nd round	(Romania) Raluca Olaru [Alt] (New Zealand) Michael Venus [Alt]	(China) Zheng Jie [15] (Finland) Henri Kontinen [15]	6–4, 6–2
Matches on No. 3 Court
Event	Winner	Loser	Score
Ladies' singles 4th round	(United States) CoCo Vandeweghe	(Czech Republic) Lucie Šafářová [6]	7–6^{(7–1)}, 7–6^{(7–4)}
Ladies' singles 4th round	(Poland) Agnieszka Radwańska [13]	(Serbia) Jelena Janković [28]	7–5, 6–4
Gentlemen's singles 4th round	(Croatia) Marin Čilić [9]	(United States) Denis Kudla [WC]	6–4, 4–6, 6–3, 7–5
Mixed doubles – 2nd round	(France) Kristina Mladenovic [8] (Canada) Daniel Nestor [8]	(United Kingdom) Johanna Konta [WC] (United Kingdom) Ken Skupski [WC]	5–7, 6–1, 6–4

== Day 8 (7 July) ==
- Seeds out:
  - Men's singles: (South Africa) Kevin Anderson [14]
  - Women's singles: (Switzerland) Timea Bacsinszky [15], (United States) Madison Keys [21], (Belarus) Victoria Azarenka [23]
  - Men's doubles: (United States) Bob Bryan / (United States) Mike Bryan [1], (Croatia) Ivan Dodig / (Brazil) Marcelo Melo [2], (Poland) Marcin Matkowski / (Serbia) Nenad Zimonjić [7], (Austria) Alexander Peya / (Brazil) Bruno Soares [8]
  - Mixed doubles: (Zimbabwe) Cara Black / (Colombia) Juan Sebastián Cabal [9]
- Schedule of play

Matches on main courts
Matches on Centre Court
Event	Winner	Loser	Score
Ladies' singles quarterfinals	(Russia) Maria Sharapova [4]	(United States) CoCo Vandeweghe	6–3, 6–7^{(3–7)}, 6–2
Ladies' singles quarterfinals	(United States) Serena Williams [1]	(Belarus) Victoria Azarenka [23]	3–6, 6–2, 6–3
Senior Gentlemen's Invitation Doubles; Round robin	(Australia) Todd Woodbridge (Australia) Mark Woodforde	(Iran) Mansour Bahrami (France) Henri Leconte	6–3, 7–6^{(7–3)}
Matches on No. 1 Court
Event	Winner	Loser	Score
Gentlemen's singles 4th round	(Serbia) Novak Djokovic [1]	(South Africa) Kevin Anderson [14]	6–7^{(6–8)}, 6–7^{(6–8)}, 6–1, 6–4, 7–5
Ladies' singles quarterfinals	(Spain) Garbiñe Muguruza [20]	(Switzerland) Timea Bacsinszky [15]	7–5, 6–3
Ladies' singles quarterfinals	(Poland) Agnieszka Radwańska [13]	(United States) Madison Keys [21]	7–6^{(7–3)}, 3–6, 6–3
Gentlemen's Invitation Doubles; Round robin	(United States) Justin Gimelstob (United Kingdom) Ross Hutchins	(Sweden) Jonas Björkman [2] (Sweden) Thomas Johansson [2]	3–6, 6–2, [10–3]
Matches on No. 2 Court
Event	Winner	Loser	Score
Mixed doubles – 3rd round	(Switzerland) Martina Hingis [7] (India) Leander Paes [7]	(Australia) Anastasia Rodionova (New Zealand) Artem Sitak	6–2, 6–2
Gentlemen's doubles quarterfinals	(United Kingdom) Jamie Murray [13] (Australia) John Peers [13]	(Austria) Alexander Peya [8] (Brazil) Bruno Soares [8]	6–4, 7–6^{(7–3)}, 6–3
Senior Gentlemen's Invitation Doubles; Round robin	(United Kingdom) Jeremy Bates (United Kingdom) Chris Wilkinson	(France) Guy Forget (France) Cédric Pioline	1–6, 6–3, [10–4]
Gentlemen's doubles quarterfinals	(India) Rohan Bopanna [9] (Romania) Florin Mergea [9]	(United States) Bob Bryan [1] (United States) Mike Bryan [1]	5–7, 6–4, 7–6^{(11–9)}, 7–6^{(7–5)}
Matches on No. 3 Court
Event	Winner	Loser	Score
Senior Gentlemen's Invitation Doubles; Round robin	(United States) Richard Leach (United States) Patrick McEnroe	(Sweden) Joakim Nyström (Sweden) Mikael Pernfors	6–2, 7–5
Gentlemen's Invitation Doubles; Round robin	(United Kingdom) Greg Rusedski (France) Fabrice Santoro	(Netherlands) Richard Krajicek (United Kingdom) Mark Petchey	7–5, 7–5
Gentlemen's doubles quarterfinals	(Netherlands) Jean-Julien Rojer [4] (Romania) Horia Tecău [4]	(Poland) Marcin Matkowski [7] (Serbia) Nenad Zimonjić [7]	6–4, 6–3, 7–6^{(7–2)}
Mixed doubles – 3rd round	(France) Kristina Mladenovic [8] (Canada) Daniel Nestor [8]	(Zimbabwe) Cara Black [9] (Colombia) Juan Sebastián Cabal [9]	6–3, 6–7^{(4–7)}, 6–3

== Day 9 (8 July) ==
- Seeds out:
  - Men's singles: (Switzerland) Stan Wawrinka [4], (Croatia) Marin Čilić [9], (France) Gilles Simon [12]
  - Women's doubles: (United States) Bethanie Mattek-Sands / (Czech Republic) Lucie Šafářová [3], (Chinese Taipei) Hsieh Su-wei / (Italy) Flavia Pennetta [7], (Australia) Casey Dellacqua / (Kazakhstan) Yaroslava Shvedova [9]
  - Mixed doubles: (South Africa) Raven Klaasen / (United States) Raquel Kops-Jones [10], (Czech Republic) Andrea Hlaváčková [16] / (Poland) Łukasz Kubot [16]
- Schedule of play

Matches on main courts
Matches on Centre Court
Event	Winner	Loser	Score
Gentlemen's singles quarterfinals	(United Kingdom) Andy Murray [3]	(Canada) Vasek Pospisil	6–4, 7–5, 6–4
Gentlemen's singles quarterfinals	(Serbia) Novak Djokovic [1]	(Croatia) Marin Čilić [9]	6–4, 6–4, 6–4
Matches on No. 1 Court
Event	Winner	Loser	Score
Gentlemen's singles quarterfinals	(Switzerland) Roger Federer [2]	(France) Gilles Simon [12]	6–3, 7–5, 6–2
Gentlemen's singles quarterfinals	(France) Richard Gasquet [21]	(Switzerland) Stan Wawrinka [4]	6–4, 4–6, 3–6, 6–4, 11–9
Matches on No. 2 Court
Event	Winner	Loser	Score
Senior Gentlemen's Invitation Doubles; Round robin	(United States) Rick Leach (United States) Patrick McEnroe	(United Kingdom) Jeremy Bates (United Kingdom) Chris Wilkinson	6–3, 6–2
Ladies' doubles quarterfinals	(Russia) Ekaterina Makarova [2] (Russia) Elena Vesnina [2]	(Zimbabwe) Cara Black (United States) Lisa Raymond	6–3, 4–6, 8–6
Ladies' Invitation Doubles; Round robin	(Bulgaria) Magdalena Maleeva (Australia) Rennae Stubbs	(United States) Chanda Rubin (France) Sandrine Testud	4–6, 6–3, [13–11]
Mixed doubles – 3rd round	(Russia) Elena Vesnina [3] (Poland) Marcin Matkowski [3]	(Czech Republic) Andrea Hlaváčková [16] (Poland) Łukasz Kubot [16]	6–7^{(4–7)}, 6–4, 11–9
Matches on No. 3 Court
Event	Winner	Loser	Score
Ladies' doubles quarterfinals	(United States) Raquel Kops-Jones [5] (United States) Abigail Spears [5]	(United States) Bethanie Mattek-Sands [3] (Czech Republic) Lucie Šafářová [3]	6–3, 6–2
Ladies' Invitation Doubles; Round robin	(United States) Lindsay Davenport (United States) Mary Joe Fernández	(France) Marion Bartoli (Croatia) Iva Majoli	6–2, 5–7, [10–2]
Mixed doubles – 3rd round	(United States) Bethanie Mattek-Sands [1] (United States) Mike Bryan [1]	(Romania) Raluca Olaru (New Zealand) Michael Venus	7–6^{(7–3)}, 7–5
Ladies' doubles quarterfinals	(Switzerland) Martina Hingis [1] (India) Sania Mirza [1]	(Australia) Casey Dellacqua [9] (Kazakhstan) Yaroslava Shvedova [9]	7–5, 6–3

== Day 10 (9 July) ==
- Seeds out:
  - Women's singles: (Russia) Maria Sharapova [4], (Poland) Agnieszka Radwańska [13]
  - Men's doubles: (India) Rohan Bopanna / (Romania) Florin Mergea [9]
  - Mixed doubles: (Brazil) Bruno Soares / (India) Sania Mirza [2], (Poland) Marcin Matkowski / (Russia) Elena Vesnina [3], (Romania) Horia Tecău / (Slovenia) Katarina Srebotnik [6], (Canada) Daniel Nestor / (France) Kristina Mladenovic [8]
- Schedule of play

Matches on main courts
Matches on Centre Court
Event	Winner	Loser	Score
Ladies' singles semifinals	(Spain) Garbiñe Muguruza [20]	(Poland) Agnieszka Radwańska [13]	6–2, 3–6, 6–3
Ladies' singles semifinals	(United States) Serena Williams [1]	(Russia) Maria Sharapova [4]	6–2, 6–4
Gentlemen's doubles semifinals	(United Kingdom) Jamie Murray [13] (Australia) John Peers [13]	(Israel) Jonathan Erlich [Q] (Germany) Philipp Petzschner [Q]	4–6, 6–3, 6–4, 6–2
Matches on No. 1 Court
Event	Winner	Loser	Score
Gentlemen's Invitation Doubles; Round robin	(Sweden) Jonas Björkman (Sweden) Thomas Johansson	(United Kingdom) Jamie Delgado (Sweden) Thomas Enqvist	6–3, 7–6^{(7–4)}
Mixed doubles – quarterfinals	(United States) Mike Bryan [1] (United States) Bethanie Mattek-Sands [1]	(Canada) Daniel Nestor [8] (France) Kristina Mladenovic [8]	7–6^{(7–2)}, 6–2
Mixed doubles – quarterfinals	(India) Leander Paes [7] (Switzerland) Martina Hingis [7]	(Poland) Marcin Matkowski [3] (Russia) Elena Vesnina [3]	6–2, 6–1
Gentlemen's Invitation Doubles; Round robin	(Croatia) Goran Ivanišević (Croatia) Ivan Ljubičić	(United States) Justin Gimelstob (United Kingdom) Ross Hutchins	6–4, 2–6, [10–6]
Gentlemen's Invitation Doubles; Round robin	(Spain) Albert Costa (Chile) Fernando González	(Netherlands) Richard Krajicek (United Kingdom) Mark Petchey	4–6, 6–1, [10–5]
Matches on No. 2 Court
Event	Winner	Loser	Score
Gentlemen's doubles semifinals	(Netherlands) Jean-Julien Rojer [4] (Romania) Horia Tecău [4]	(India) Rohan Bopanna [9] (Romania) Florin Mergea [9]	4–6, 6–2, 6–3, 4–6, 13–11
Mixed doubles – quarterfinals	(Austria) Alexander Peya [5] (Hungary) Tímea Babos [5]	(Brazil) Bruno Soares [2] (India) Sania Mirza [2]	3–6, 7–6^{(8–6)}, 9–7
Mixed doubles – quarterfinals	(Sweden) Robert Lindstedt (Spain) Anabel Medina Garrigues	(Romania) Horia Tecău [6] (Slovenia) Katarina Srebotnik [6]	6–4, 1–6, 6–3
Matches on No. 3 Court
Event	Winner	Loser	Score
Ladies' Invitation Doubles; Round robin	(Czech Republic) Jana Novotná (Austria) Barbara Schett	(United States) Andrea Jaeger (Hungary) Andrea Temesvári	6–1, 7–5
Senior Gentlemen's Invitation Doubles; Round Robin	(United Kingdom) Andrew Castle (United States) Jeff Tarango	(Australia) Todd Woodbridge (Australia) Mark Woodforde	4–6, 7–6^{(7–5)}, [13–11]
Senior Gentlemen's Invitation Doubles; Round Robin	(France) Guy Forget (France) Cédric Pioline	(United States) Rick Leach (United States) Patrick McEnroe	6–3, 6–2

== Day 11 (10 July) ==
- Seeds out:
  - Men's singles: (United Kingdom) Andy Murray [3], (France) Richard Gasquet [21]
  - Women's doubles: (Hungary) Tímea Babos / (France) Kristina Mladenovic [4], (United States) Raquel Kops-Jones / (United States) Abigail Spears [5]
  - Mixed doubles: (United States) Bethanie Mattek-Sands / (United States) Mike Bryan [1]
- Schedule of play

Matches on main courts
Matches on Centre Court
Event	Winner	Loser	Score
Gentlemen's singles semifinals	(Serbia) Novak Djokovic [1]	(France) Richard Gasquet [21]	7–6^{(7–2)}, 6–4, 6–4
Gentlemen's singles semifinals	(Switzerland) Roger Federer [2]	(United Kingdom) Andy Murray [3]	7–5, 7–5, 6–4
Matches on No. 1 Court
Event	Winner	Loser	Score
Ladies' doubles semifinals	(Switzerland) Martina Hingis [1] (India) Sania Mirza [1]	(United States) Raquel Kops-Jones [5] (United States) Abigail Spears [5]	6–1, 6–2
Senior Gentlemen's Invitation Doubles; Round robin	(United Kingdom) Jeremy Bates (United Kingdom) Chris Wilkinson	(Sweden) Joakim Nyström (Sweden) Mikael Pernfors	7–5, 6–1
Mixed doubles – semifinals	(Switzerland) Martina Hingis [7] (India) Leander Paes [7]	(United States) Bethanie Mattek-Sands [1] (United States) Mike Bryan [1]	6–3, 6–4
Mixed doubles – semifinals	(Hungary) Tímea Babos [5] (Austria) Alexander Peya [5]	(Spain) Anabel Medina Garrigues (Sweden) Robert Lindstedt	4–6, 6–3, [11–9]
Matches on No. 3 Court
Event	Winner	Loser	Score
Gentlemen's Invitation Doubles; Round robin	(United Kingdom) Jamie Baker (France) Fabrice Santoro	(Spain) Albert Costa (Chile) Fernando González	6–1, 2–6, [11–9]
Ladies' doubles semifinals	(Russia) Ekaterina Makarova [2] (Russia) Elena Vesnina [2]	(Hungary) Tímea Babos [4] (France) Kristina Mladenovic [4]	6–3, 4–6, 6–4
Ladies' Invitation Doubles; Round robin	(United States) Chanda Rubin (France) Sandrine Testud	(Czech Republic) Jana Novotná (Austria) Barbara Schett	6–4, 3–6, [10–8]
Senior Gentlemen's Invitation Doubles; Round robin	(Netherlands) Jacco Eltingh (Austria) Paul Haarhuis	(Australia) Todd Woodbridge (Australia) Mark Woodforde	7–5, 6–4

== Day 12 (11 July) ==
- Seeds out:
  - Women's singles: (Spain) Garbiñe Muguruza [20]
  - Men's doubles: (United Kingdom) Jamie Murray / (Australia) John Peers [13]
  - Women's doubles: (Russia) Ekaterina Makarova / (Russia) Elena Vesnina [2]
- Schedule of play

Matches on main courts
Matches on Centre Court
Event	Winner	Loser	Score
Ladies' singles final	(United States) Serena Williams [1]	(Spain) Garbiñe Muguruza [20]	6–4, 6–4
Gentlemen's doubles final	(Netherlands) Jean-Julien Rojer [4] (Romania) Horia Tecău [4]	(United Kingdom) Jamie Murray [13] (Australia) John Peers [13]	7–6^{(7–5)}, 6–4, 6–4
Ladies' doubles final	(Switzerland) Martina Hingis [1] (India) Sania Mirza [1]	(Russia) Ekaterina Makarova [2] (Russia) Elena Vesnina [2]	5–7, 7–6^{(7–4)}, 7–5
Matches on No. 1 Court
Event	Winner	Loser	Score
Senior Gentlemen's Invitation Doubles; Round robin	(France) Guy Forget (France) Cédric Pioline	(Sweden) Joakim Nyström (Sweden) Mikael Pernfors	6–3, 6–3
Gentlemen's Invitation Doubles; Round robin	(Croatia) Goran Ivanišević (Croatia) Ivan Ljubičić	(Sweden) Jonas Björkman (Sweden) Thomas Johansson	6–1, 1–6, [10–7]
Matches on No. 3 Court
Event	Winner	Loser	Score
Gentlemen's Invitation Doubles; Round robin	(South Africa) Wayne Ferreira (France) Sébastien Grosjean	(Netherlands) Richard Krajicek (United Kingdom) Mark Petchey	6–3, 6–4

== Day 13 (12 July) ==
- Seeds out:
  - Men's singles: (Switzerland) Roger Federer [2]
  - Mixed doubles: (Austria) Alexander Peya / (Hungary) Tímea Babos [5]
- Schedule of play

Matches on main courts
Matches on Centre Court
Event	Winner	Loser	Score
Gentlemen's singles final	(Serbia) Novak Djokovic [1]	(Switzerland) Roger Federer [2]	7–6^{(7–1)}, 6–7^{(10–12)}, 6–4, 6–3
Mixed doubles final	(Switzerland) Martina Hingis [7] (India) Leander Paes [7]	(Hungary) Tímea Babos [5] (Austria) Alexander Peya [5]	6–1, 6–1
Matches on No. 1 Court
Event	Winner	Loser	Score
Senior gentlemen's invitation doubles Final	(Netherlands) Jacco Eltingh (Netherlands) Paul Haarhuis	(France) Guy Forget (France) Cédric Pioline	6–4, 6–4
Matches on No. 3 Court
Event	Winner	Loser	Score
Gentlemen's invitation doubles Final	(Croatia) Goran Ivanišević (Croatia) Ivan Ljubičić	(South Africa) Wayne Ferreira (France) Sébastien Grosjean	6–3, 1–6, [10–5]
