= Benjamin Hannestad =

Danish tennis player

- Country (sports): Denmark
- Residence: Bradenton, Florida, United States
- Born: 14 February 1997 (age 29) Copenhagen, Denmark
- Plays: Right-handed (two-handed backhand)
- Prize money: US $13,534

Singles
- Career record: 1–2 (at ATP Tour level, Grand Slam level, and in Davis Cup)
- Career titles: 0
- Highest ranking: No. 919 (19 June 2017)
- Current ranking: No. 1,344 (16 February 2026)

Grand Slam singles results
- Australian Open Junior: 1R (2015)
- French Open Junior: Q1 (2015)
- Wimbledon Junior: 1R (2015)
- US Open Junior: 1R (2014, 2015)

Doubles
- Career record: 1–0 (at ATP Tour level, Grand Slam level, and in Davis Cup)
- Career titles: 0
- Highest ranking: No. 624 (20 October 2025)
- Current ranking: No. 816 (16 February 2026)

Grand Slam doubles results
- Australian Open Junior: 1R (2015)
- Wimbledon Junior: 2R (2015)
- US Open Junior: QF (2015)

Team competitions
- Davis Cup: 1–0
- Last updated on: 16 February 2026.

Benjamin Hannestad (born 14 February 1997) is a Danish tennis player.

Playing for Denmark in the Davis Cup, Hannestad has a win–loss record of 2–2.

== See also ==
- List of Denmark Davis Cup team representatives
