= 2015 Wimbledon Championships – Girls' singles =

Girls' singles
- 2015 Wimbledon Championships

Final
- Champion: (Russia) Sofya Zhuk
- Runner-up: (Russia) Anna Blinkova
- Score: 7–5, 6–4

Events
Singles	men	women		boys	girls
Doubles	men	women	mixed	boys	girls
WC Singles	men	women	quad
WC Doubles	men	women	quad
Legends	men	women	seniors
- Wimbledon Championships

Unseeded Russian Sofya Zhuk won the title, defeating compatriot and 12th seed Anna Blinkova in the final, 7–5, 6–4.

Jeļena Ostapenko was the defending champion, but participated in the women's singles competition after receiving a wildcard. She defeated ninth seed Carla Suárez Navarro before losing to Kristina Mladenovic in the second round.

== Seeds ==
1. (Czech Republic) Markéta Vondroušová (first round)
2. (China) Xu Shilin (second round)
3. (Hungary) Dalma Gálfi (first round)
4. (Russia) Anna Kalinskaya (first round)
5. (United Kingdom) Katie Swan (quarterfinals)
6. (United States) Usue Maitane Arconada (third round)
7. (Canada) Charlotte Robillard-Millette (second round)
8. (Czech Republic) Miriam Kolodziejová (first round)
9. (United States) Sofia Kenin (third round)
10. (Slovakia) Tereza Mihalíková (third round)
11. (Hungary) Fanny Stollár (third round)
12. (Russia) Anna Blinkova (final)
13. (Brazil) Luisa Stefani (first round)
14. (Argentina) Julieta Lara Estable (first round)
15. (India) Pranjala Yadlapalli (second round)
16. (China) Zheng Wushuang (first round)

== Main draw ==
Key

- Q = Qualifier
- WC = Wild card
- LL = Lucky loser
- Alt = Alternate
- ITF = ITF entry
- PR = Protected ranking
- SR = Special ranking
- SE = Special exempt
- JE = Junior exempt
- JR = Junior Accelerator Programme entrant
- CO = College Accelerator Programme entrant
- NG = Next Gen Accelerator Program entrant
- w/o = Walkover
- r = Retired
- d = Defaulted

=== Finals ===
Quarterfinals
WC	(Russia) Anastasia Potapova	4	3
(Russia) Sofya Zhuk	6	6
Q	(Slovakia) Viktória Kužmová	7^{7}	6
5	(United Kingdom) Katie Swan	6^{2}	0
12	(Russia) Anna Blinkova	1	6	12
WC	(United States) Tornado Alicia Black	6	3	10
(Belarus) Vera Lapko	6	7^{7}
(United States) Michaela Gordon	3	6^{4}

Semifinals
(Russia) Sofya Zhuk	6	6
Q	(Slovakia) Viktória Kužmová	1	3
12	(Russia) Anna Blinkova	6	7^{7}
(Belarus) Vera Lapko	2	6^{1}

Final
(Russia) Sofya Zhuk	7	6
12	(Russia) Anna Blinkova	5	4

=== Top half ===
==== Section 1 ====
First round
1	(Czech Republic) Markéta Vondroušová	1	2
WC	(United Kingdom) Anna Brogan	6	6
Q	(China) Yuan Yue	0	3
Q	(Ukraine) Katarina Zavatska	6	6
WC	(Russia) Anastasia Potapova	7	6
(United States) Francesca Di Lorenzo	5	3
(Romania) Jaqueline Cristian	3	6	6
16	(China) Zheng Wushuang	6	3	4
11	(Hungary) Fanny Stollár	6	6
(Italy) Beatrice Torelli	0	3
(United States) Kayla Day	7^{7}	6
(France) Tessah Andrianjafitrimo	6^{5}	3
WC	(United Kingdom) Ali Collins	4	3
(Russia) Sofya Zhuk	6	6
(Australia) Naiktha Bains	3	6	7
7	(Canada) Charlotte Robillard-Millette	6	4	9

Second round
WC	(United Kingdom) A Brogan	6	6
Q	(Ukraine) K Zavatska	1	3
WC	(Russia) A Potapova	6	6
(Romania) J Cristian	3	1
11	(Hungary) F Stollár	7	7
(United States) K Day	5	5
(Russia) S Zhuk	6	7
7	(Canada) C Robillard-Millette	2	5

Third round
WC	(United Kingdom) A Brogan	4	4
WC	(Russia) A Potapova	6	6
11	(Hungary) F Stollár	4	1
(Russia) S Zhuk	6	6

Quarterfinals
WC	(Russia) A Potapova	4	3
(Russia) S Zhuk	6	6

==== Section 2 ====
First round
4	(Russia) Anna Kalinskaya	6^{4}	4
Q	(Slovakia) Viktória Kužmová	7^{7}	6
(United States) Raveena Kingsley	6	5	6
Q	(Australia) Destanee Aiava	4	7	3
(United Kingdom) Emily Arbuthnott	3	2
(Australia) Olivia Tjandramulia	6	6
(United States) Caroline Dolehide	6	4	6
14	(Argentina) Julieta Lara Estable	4	6	2
9	(United States) Sofia Kenin	6	6
(Canada) Bianca Andreescu	3	1
Q	(Brazil) Sophia Chow	2	1
(Switzerland) Jil Teichmann	6	6
(Indonesia) Deria Nur Haliza	6	6
Q	(Slovenia) Manca Pislak	4	4
(Australia) Seone Mendez	7^{7}	2	4
5	(United Kingdom) Katie Swan	6^{5}	6	6

Second round
Q	(Slovakia) V Kužmová	4	7^{7}	6
(United States) R Kingsley	6	6^{2}	4
(Australia) O Tjandramulia	4	2
(United States) C Dolehide	6	6
9	(United States) S Kenin	7	6
(Switzerland) J Teichmann	5	4
(Indonesia) D Nur Haliza	1	2
5	(United Kingdom) K Swan	6	6

Third round
Q	(Slovakia) V Kužmová	4	6	6
(United States) C Dolehide	6	4	4
9	(United States) S Kenin	6^{1}	2
5	(United Kingdom) K Swan	7^{7}	6

Quarterfinals
Q	(Slovakia) V Kužmová	7^{7}	6
5	(United Kingdom) K Swan	6^{2}	0

=== Bottom half ===
==== Section 3 ====
First round
6	(United States) Usue Maitane Arconada	7^{9}	6^{5}	6
(Czech Republic) Monika Kilnarová	6^{7}	7^{7}	3
WC	(United Kingdom) Jodie Anna Burrage	1	5
Q	(France) Lucie Wargnier	6	7
(Australia) Kimberly Birrell	7^{7}	6
(Denmark) Emilie Francati	6^{5}	4
Q	(Romania) Ioana Mincă	2	7	0
12	(Russia) Anna Blinkova	6	5	6
13	(Brazil) Luisa Stefani	0	1
(United States) Claire Liu	6	6
(Japan) Chihiro Muramatsu	3	6^{1}
(Russia) Evgeniya Levashova	6	7^{7}
(Canada) Katherine Sebov	1	2
WC	(United States) Tornado Alicia Black	6	6
(United Kingdom) Maia Lumsden	7	6
3	(Hungary) Dalma Gálfi	5	3

Second round
6	(United States) UM Arconada	6	2	6
Q	(France) L Wargnier	3	6	4
(Australia) K Birrell	3	4
12	(Russia) A Blinkova	6	6
(United States) C Liu	5	6	7
(Russia) E Levashova	7	2	5
WC	(United States) TA Black	6	6
(United Kingdom) M Lumsden	1	1

Third round
6	(United States) UM Arconada	4	3
12	(Russia) A Blinkova	6	6
(United States) C Liu	3	2
WC	(United States) TA Black	6	6

Quarterfinals
12	(Russia) A Blinkova	1	6	12
WC	(United States) TA Black	6	3	10

==== Section 4 ====
First round
8	(Czech Republic) Miriam Kolodziejová	1	1
(Belarus) Vera Lapko	6	6
(Australia) Maddison Inglis	3	3
(Belgium) Greet Minnen	6	6
WC	(United Kingdom) Lauryn John-Baptiste	4	2
(United States) Ingrid Neel	6	6
(Russia) Aleksandra Pospelova	6	3	2
10	(Slovakia) Tereza Mihalíková	1	6	6
15	(India) Pranjala Yadlapalli	6	6
(Colombia) María Fernanda Herazo	4	2
(Switzerland) Rebeka Masarova	7^{7}	6^{5}	2
(United States) Michaela Gordon	6^{2}	7^{7}	6
WC	(United Kingdom) Freya Christie	2	3
(Russia) Olesya Pervushina	6	6
(Algeria) Inès Ibbou	6^{2}	0
2	(China) Xu Shilin	7^{7}	6

Second round
(Belarus) V Lapko	6^{3}	6	7
(Belgium) G Minnen	7^{7}	3	5
(United States) I Neel	7^{7}	2	4
10	(Slovakia) T Mihalíková	6^{5}	6	6
15	(India) P Yadlapalli	2	3
(United States) M Gordon	6	6
(Russia) O Pervushina	6	4	6
2	(China) S Xu	3	6	3

Third round
(Belarus) V Lapko	6	7
10	(Slovakia) T Mihalíková	2	5
(United States) M Gordon	1	7^{7}	6
(Russia) O Pervushina	6	6^{5}	2

Quarterfinals
(Belarus) V Lapko	6	7^{7}
(United States) M Gordon	3	6^{4}
