= 2015 Wimbledon Championships – Wheelchair women's doubles =

Wheelchair women's doubles
- 2015 Wimbledon Championships

Final
- Champions: (Japan) Yui Kamiji (United Kingdom) Jordanne Whiley
- Runners-up: (Netherlands) Jiske Griffioen (Netherlands) Aniek van Koot
- Score: 6–2, 5–7, 6–3

Events
Singles	men	women		boys	girls
Doubles	men	women	mixed	boys	girls
WC Singles	men	women	quad
WC Doubles	men	women	quad
Legends	men	women	seniors
← 2014 ·	Wimbledon Championships	· 2016 →

Defending champions Yui Kamiji and Jordanne Whiley defeated Jiske Griffioen and Aniek van Koot in the final, 6–2, 5–7, 6–3 to win the ladies' doubles wheelchair tennis title at the 2015 Wimbledon Championships.

== Seeds ==
1. (Japan) Yui Kamiji / (United Kingdom) Jordanne Whiley (champions)
2. (Netherlands) Jiske Griffioen / (Netherlands) Aniek van Koot (final)

== Draw ==
=== Key ===
- Q = Qualifier
- WC = Wild card
- LL = Lucky loser
- Alt = Alternate
- ITF = ITF entry
- PR = Protected ranking
- SR = Special ranking
- SE = Special exempt
- JE = Junior exempt
- JR = Junior Accelerator Programme entrant
- CO = College Accelerator Programme entrant
- NG = Next Gen Accelerator Program entrant
- w/o = Walkover
- r = Retired
- d = Defaulted

=== Finals ===
Semifinals
1	(Japan) Yui Kamiji (United Kingdom) Jordanne Whiley	6	6
WC	(United Kingdom) Louise Hunt (Germany) Katharina Krüger	0	3
(Germany) Sabine Ellerbrock (United Kingdom) Lucy Shuker	2	4
2	(Netherlands) Jiske Griffioen (Netherlands) Aniek van Koot	6	6

Final
1	(Japan) Yui Kamiji (United Kingdom) Jordanne Whiley	6	5	6
2	(Netherlands) Jiske Griffioen (Netherlands) Aniek van Koot	2	7	3
Third place
WC	(United Kingdom) Louise Hunt (Germany) Katharina Krüger	1	1
(Germany) Sabine Ellerbrock (United Kingdom) Lucy Shuker	6	6
