= 2015 Wimbledon Championships – Girls' doubles =

Girls' doubles
- 2015 Wimbledon Championships

Final
- Champions: (Hungary) Dalma Gálfi (Hungary) Fanny Stollár
- Runners-up: (Belarus) Vera Lapko (Slovakia) Tereza Mihalíková
- Score: 6–3, 6–2

Events
Singles	men	women		boys	girls
Doubles	men	women	mixed	boys	girls
WC Singles	men	women	quad
WC Doubles	men	women	quad
Legends	men	women	seniors
← 2014 ·	Wimbledon Championships	· 2016 →

Tami Grende and Ye Qiuyu were the defending champions, but chose not to participate.

Dalma Gálfi and Fanny Stollár won the title after defeating Vera Lapko and Tereza Mihalíková 6–3, 6–2 in the final.

== Seeds ==
1. (Czech Republic) Miriam Kolodziejová / (Czech Republic) Markéta Vondroušová (semifinals)
2. (United States) Usue Maitane Arconada / (Canada) Charlotte Robillard-Millette (second round)
3. (Hungary) Dalma Gálfi / (Hungary) Fanny Stollár (champions)
4. (Russia) Anna Kalinskaya / (Russia) Evgeniya Levashova (first round)
5. (Argentina) Julieta Lara Estable / (China) Zheng Wushuang (first round)
6. (Switzerland) Jil Teichmann / (China) Xu Shilin (quarterfinals)
7. (Russia) Anna Blinkova / (Russia) Olesya Pervushina (quarterfinals)
8. (United States) Francesca Di Lorenzo / (Brazil) Luisa Stefani (second round)

== Draw ==
=== Key ===
- Q = Qualifier
- WC = Wild card
- LL = Lucky loser
- Alt = Alternate
- SE = Special exempt
- PR = Protected ranking
- ITF = ITF entry
- JE = Junior exempt
- w/o = Walkover
- r = Retired
- d = Defaulted
- SR = Special ranking

=== Finals ===
Semifinals
1	(Czech Republic) Miriam Kolodziejová (Czech Republic) Markéta Vondroušová	6^{2}	4
3	(Hungary) Dalma Gálfi (Hungary) Fanny Stollár	7^{7}	6
(Belarus) Vera Lapko (Slovakia) Tereza Mihalíková	6	7
WC	(United Kingdom) Anna Brogan (United Kingdom) Freya Christie	4	5

Final
3	(Hungary) Dalma Gálfi (Hungary) Fanny Stollár	6	6
(Belarus) Vera Lapko (Slovakia) Tereza Mihalíková	3	2

=== Top half ===
First round
1	(Czech Republic) Miriam Kolodziejová (Czech Republic) Markéta Vondroušová	6	6
(Romania) Jaqueline Cristian (United States) Sofia Kenin	1	0
(Canada) Bianca Andreescu (Canada) Katherine Sebov	6	6
WC	(United Kingdom) Georgina Axon (United Kingdom) Holly Hutchinson	0	2
(Japan) Chihiro Muramatsu (India) Pranjala Yadlapalli	3	2
(Colombia) María Fernanda Herazo (Indonesia) Deria Nur Haliza	6	6
(Brazil) Sophia Chow (China) Yuan Yue	0	2
7	(Russia) Anna Blinkova (Russia) Olesya Pervushina	6	6
3	(Hungary) Dalma Gálfi (Hungary) Fanny Stollár	6	6
WC	(United Kingdom) Jasmine Amber Ashgar (United Kingdom) Eden Richardson	2	1
(Greece) Eleni Christofi (Namibia) Lesedi Sheya Jacobs	2	1
(Romania) Karola Patricia Bejenaru (Hungary) Panna Udvardy	6	6
(Australia) Kimberly Birrell (Australia) Maddison Inglis	4	2
(United States) Michaela Gordon (United States) Claire Liu	6	6
(United Kingdom) Maia Lumsden (United States) Ingrid Neel	6	7
5	(Argentina) Julieta Lara Estable (China) Zheng Wushuang	3	5

Second round
1	(Czech Republic) M Kolodziejová (Czech Republic) M Vondroušová	6	6
(Canada) B Andreescu (Canada) K Sebov	4	2
(Colombia) MF Herazo (Indonesia) D Nur Haliza	3	4
7	(Russia) A Blinkova (Russia) O Pervushina	6	6
3	(Hungary) D Gálfi (Hungary) F Stollár	7	6
(Romania) KP Bejenaru (Hungary) P Udvardy	5	3
(United States) M Gordon (United States) C Liu	3	2
(United Kingdom) M Lumsden (United States) I Neel	6	6

Quarterfinals
1	(Czech Republic) M Kolodziejová (Czech Republic) M Vondroušová	6	6
7	(Russia) A Blinkova (Russia) O Pervushina	3	1
3	(Hungary) D Gálfi (Hungary) F Stollár	6	6
(United Kingdom) M Lumsden (United States) I Neel	0	2

Semifinals
1	(Czech Republic) M Kolodziejová (Czech Republic) M Vondroušová	6^{2}	4
3	(Hungary) D Gálfi (Hungary) F Stollár	7^{7}	6

=== Bottom half ===
First round
8	(United States) Francesca Di Lorenzo (Brazil) Luisa Stefani	3	7	6
WC	(United Kingdom) Jodie Anna Burrage (United Kingdom) Ali Collins	6	5	1
(Australia) Destanee Aiava (Australia) Olivia Tjandramulia	6	6
(Algeria) Inès Ibbou (Ukraine) Katarina Zavatska	2	1
(Belarus) Vera Lapko (Slovakia) Tereza Mihalíková	6	7^{7}
(France) Tessah Andrianjafitrimo (Australia) Seone Mendez	2	6^{4}
(United States) Kayla Day (Czech Republic) Monika Kilnarová	6	7^{9}
4	(Russia) Anna Kalinskaya (Russia) Evgeniya Levashova	3	6^{7}
6	(Switzerland) Jil Teichmann (China) Xu Shilin	2	6	6
(Russia) Aleksandra Pospelova (Russia) Sofya Zhuk	6	4	4
(Australia) Naiktha Bains (United States) Tornado Alicia Black	6	6
(United Kingdom) Emily Arbuthnott (Denmark) Emilie Francati	1	4
WC	(United Kingdom) Anna Brogan (United Kingdom) Freya Christie	6	3	6
(Slovakia) Viktória Kužmová (Italy) Beatrice Torelli	3	6	2
(Romania) Ioana Mincă (Slovenia) Manca Pislak	6^{5}	1
2	(United States) Usue Maitane Arconada (Canada) Charlotte Robillard-Millette	7^{7}	6

Second round
8	(United States) F Di Lorenzo (Brazil) L Stefani	4	7^{7}	3
(Australia) D Aiava (Australia) O Tjandramulia	6	6^{3}	6
(Belarus) V Lapko (Slovakia) T Mihalíková	7	6
(United States) K Day (Czech Republic) M Kilnarová	5	1
6	(Switzerland) J Teichmann (China) S Xu	6	7
(Australia) N Bains (United States) TA Black	4	5
WC	(United Kingdom) A Brogan (United Kingdom) F Christie	7	6
2	(United States) UM Arconada (Canada) C Robillard-Millette	5	2

Quarterfinals
(Australia) D Aiava (Australia) O Tjandramulia	6	3	1
(Belarus) V Lapko (Slovakia) T Mihalíková	3	6	6
6	(Switzerland) J Teichmann (China) S Xu	4	5
WC	(United Kingdom) A Brogan (United Kingdom) F Christie	6	7

Semifinals
(Belarus) V Lapko (Slovakia) T Mihalíková	6	7
WC	(United Kingdom) A Brogan (United Kingdom) F Christie	4	5
