= 2015 Wimbledon Championships – Boys' doubles =

Boys' doubles
- 2015 Wimbledon Championships

Final
- Champions: (Vietnam) Lý Hoàng Nam (India) Sumit Nagal
- Runners-up: (United States) Reilly Opelka (Japan) Akira Santillan
- Score: 7–6^{(7–4)}, 6–4

Events
| Singles | men | women | | boys | girls |
| Doubles | men | women | mixed | boys | girls |
| WC Singles | men | women | quad |
| WC Doubles | men | women | quad |
| Legends | men | women | seniors |
| ← 2014 · | Wimbledon Championships | · 2016 → |

Orlando Luz and Marcelo Zormann were the defending champions, but they chose to participate at the Pan American Games instead.

Lý Hoàng Nam and Sumit Nagal, won the title defeating Reilly Opelka and Akira Santillan, 7–6^{(7–4)}, 6–4 in the final.

== Seeds ==
1. (United States) Taylor Harry Fritz / (United States) Michael Mmoh (semifinals)
2. (South Korea) Chung Yun-seong / (South Korea) Hong Seong-chan (first round)
3. (United States) William Blumberg / (United States) Tommy Paul (quarterfinals)
4. (United States) Reilly Opelka / (Japan) Akira Santillan (final)
5. (Serbia) Miomir Kecmanović / (Norway) Casper Ruud (semifinals)
6. (Uzbekistan) Jurabek Karimov / (Argentina) Manuel Peña López (first round)
7. (Argentina) Franco Capalbo / (Spain) Álvaro López San Martín (first round)
8. (Vietnam) Lý Hoàng Nam / (India) Sumit Nagal (champions)

== Draw ==
=== Key ===
- Q = Qualifier
- WC = Wild card
- LL = Lucky loser
- Alt = Alternate
- SE = Special exempt
- PR = Protected ranking
- ITF = ITF entry
- JE = Junior exempt
- w/o = Walkover
- r = Retired
- d = Defaulted
- SR = Special ranking

=== Finals ===
Semifinals
1 | (United States) Taylor Harry Fritz (United States) Michael Mmoh | 3 | 4
4 | (United States) Reilly Opelka (Japan) Akira Santillan | 6 | 6
5 | (Serbia) Miomir Kecmanović (Norway) Casper Ruud | 6^{5} | 6 | 10
8 | (Vietnam) Lý Hoàng Nam (India) Sumit Nagal | 7^{7} | 3 | 12

Final
4 | (United States) Reilly Opelka (Japan) Akira Santillan | 6^{4} | 4
8 | (Vietnam) Lý Hoàng Nam (India) Sumit Nagal | 7^{7} | 6

=== Top half ===
First round
1 | (United States) Taylor Harry Fritz (United States) Michael Mmoh | 7 | 1 | 6
(Poland) Hubert Hurkacz (Slovakia) Alex Molčan | 5 | 6 | 4
(Philippines) Alberto Lim (Chinese Taipei) Wu Tung-lin | 4 | 5
(Germany) Tim Sandkaulen (Hungary) Máté Valkusz | 6 | 7
(Italy) Federico Bonacia (Italy) Andrea Pellegrino | 5 | 6^{5}
(France) Geoffrey Blancaneaux (Tunisia) Aziz Dougaz | 7 | 7^{7}
(Portugal) Felipe Cunha e Silva (Canada) Alejandro Tabilo | 6 | 6
6 | (Uzbekistan) Jurabek Karimov (Argentina) Manuel Peña López | 3 | 2
4 | (United States) Reilly Opelka (Japan) Akira Santillan | 6 | 6
(France) Corentin Denolly (Switzerland) Johan Nikles | 3 | 2
(United States) Emil Reinberg (Greece) Stefanos Tsitsipas | 4 | 6^{4}
WC | (United Kingdom) Fin Bass (United Kingdom) Alexis Canter | 6 | 7^{7}
(Japan) Sora Fukuda (South Korea) Oh Chan-yeong | 1 | 2
(Norway) Viktor Durasovic (Finland) Patrik Niklas-Salminen | 6 | 6
Alt | (Israel) Yshai Oliel (China) Wu Yibing | 6 | 4 | 7
7 | (Argentina) Franco Capalbo (Spain) Álvaro López San Martín | 4 | 6 | 5

Second round
1 | (United States) TH Fritz (United States) M Mmoh | 6 | 6^{6} | 9
(Germany) T Sandkaulen (Hungary) M Valkusz | 3 | 7^{8} | 7
(France) G Blancaneaux (Tunisia) A Dougaz | 6 | 7^{10}
(Portugal) F Cunha e Silva (Canada) A Tabilo | 4 | 6^{8}
4 | (United States) R Opelka (Japan) A Santillan | 6 | 7
WC | (United Kingdom) F Bass (United Kingdom) A Canter | 1 | 5
(Norway) V Durasovic (Finland) P Niklas-Salminen | 7^{7} | 6^{4} | 6
Alt | (Israel) Y Oliel (China) Y Wu | 6^{3} | 7^{7} | 2

Quarterfinals
1 | (United States) TH Fritz (United States) M Mmoh | 6 | 3 | 6
(France) G Blancaneaux (Tunisia) A Dougaz | 2 | 6 | 3
4 | (United States) R Opelka (Japan) A Santillan | 4 | 7^{9} | 6
(Norway) V Durasovic (Finland) P Niklas-Salminen | 6 | 6^{7} | 2

Semifinals
1 | (United States) TH Fritz (United States) M Mmoh | 3 | 4
4 | (United States) R Opelka (Japan) A Santillan | 6 | 6

=== Bottom half ===
First round
5 | (Serbia) Miomir Kecmanović (Norway) Casper Ruud | 6 | 6
WC | (United Kingdom) Luke Oakley (United Kingdom) Ryan James Storrie | 3 | 1
(Denmark) Benjamin Hannestad (Sweden) Mikael Ymer | 7^{7} | 6
(United States) Ulises Blanch (Argentina) Juan Pablo Ficovich | 6^{5} | 3
(Portugal) Nuno Borges (Poland) Michał Dembek | 6 | 6
WC | (United Kingdom) Jay Clarke (Slovakia) Lukáš Klein | 4 | 3
(Australia) Jake Delaney (Australia) Marc Polmans | 6^{3} | 6 | 3
3 | (United States) William Blumberg (United States) Tommy Paul | 7^{7} | 1 | 6
8 | (Vietnam) Lý Hoàng Nam (India) Sumit Nagal | 6 | 7
(Australia) Alex De Minaur (Japan) Yosuke Watanuki | 4 | 5
(Estonia) Kenneth Raisma (Canada) Denis Shapovalov | 2 | 6 | 4
WC | (United Kingdom) Jonathan Gray (United Kingdom) Ewan Moore | 6 | 1 | 6
(Italy) Marco Mosciatti (Switzerland) Marko Osmakcic | 6 | 6
(Chile) Marcelo Tomás Barrios Vera (Peru) Juan José Rosas | 3 | 3
(Japan) Yusuke Takahashi (Japan) Jumpei Yamasaki | 7^{7} | 2 | 6
2 | (South Korea) Chung Yun-seong (South Korea) Hong Seong-chan | 6^{3} | 6 | 3

Second round
5 | (Serbia) M Kecmanović (Norway) C Ruud | 6 | 6
(Denmark) B Hannestad (Sweden) M Ymer | 3 | 3
(Portugal) N Borges (Poland) M Dembek | 2 | 3
3 | (United States) W Blumberg (United States) T Paul | 6 | 6
8 | (Vietnam) NH Lý (India) S Nagal | 3 | 6 | 6
WC | (United Kingdom) J Gray (United Kingdom) E Moore | 6 | 4 | 4
(Italy) M Mosciatti (Switzerland) M Osmakcic | 7 | 2 | 3
(Japan) Y Takahashi (Japan) J Yamasaki | 5 | 6 | 6

Quarterfinals
5 | (Serbia) M Kecmanović (Norway) C Ruud | 4 | 6 | 9
3 | (United States) W Blumberg (United States) T Paul | 6 | 3 | 7
8 | (Vietnam) NH Lý (India) S Nagal | 6 | 6
(Japan) Y Takahashi (Japan) J Yamasaki | 2 | 3

Semifinals
5 | (Serbia) M Kecmanović (Norway) C Ruud | 6^{5} | 6 | 10
8 | (Vietnam) NH Lý (India) S Nagal | 7^{7} | 3 | 12
