= 2015 Wimbledon Championships – Wheelchair men's doubles =

Wheelchair men's doubles
- 2015 Wimbledon Championships

Final
- Champions: (Argentina) Gustavo Fernández (France) Nicolas Peifer
- Runners-up: (United Kingdom) Gordon Reid (France) Michaël Jérémiasz
- Score: 7–5, 5–7, 6–2

Events
| Singles | men | women | | boys | girls |
| Doubles | men | women | mixed | boys | girls |
| WC Singles | men | women | quad |
| WC Doubles | men | women | quad |
| Legends | men | women | seniors |
| ← 2014 · | Wimbledon Championships | · 2016 → |

Gustavo Fernández and Nicolas Peifer defeated Gordon Reid and Michaël Jérémiasz in the final, 7–5, 5–7, 6–2 to win the gentlemen's doubles wheelchair tennis title at the 2015 Wimbledon Championships.

Stéphane Houdet and Shingo Kunieda were the defending champions, but were defeated by Fernández and Peifer in the semifinals.

== Seeds ==
1. (France) Stéphane Houdet / (Japan) Shingo Kunieda (semifinals)
2. (United Kingdom) Gordon Reid / (France) Michaël Jeremiasz (final)

== Draw ==
=== Key ===
- Q = Qualifier
- WC = Wild card
- LL = Lucky loser
- Alt = Alternate
- ITF = ITF entry
- PR = Protected ranking
- SR = Special ranking
- SE = Special exempt
- JE = Junior exempt
- JR = Junior Accelerator Programme entrant
- CO = College Accelerator Programme entrant
- NG = Next Gen Accelerator Program entrant
- w/o = Walkover
- r = Retired
- d = Defaulted

=== Finals ===
Semifinals
1 | (France) Stéphane Houdet (Japan) Shingo Kunieda | 3 | 5
(Argentina) Gustavo Fernández (France) Nicolas Peifer | 6 | 7
WC | (Belgium) Joachim Gérard (United Kingdom) Alfie Hewett | 6^{9} | 6 | 6^{4}
2 | (France) Michaël Jeremiasz (United Kingdom) Gordon Reid | 7^{11} | 3 | 7^{7}

Final
(Argentina) Gustavo Fernández (France) Nicolas Peifer | 7 | 5 | 6
2 | (France) Michaël Jeremiasz (United Kingdom) Gordon Reid | 5 | 7 | 2
Third place
1 | (France) Stéphane Houdet (Japan) Shingo Kunieda | 2 | 7 | 6
WC | (Belgium) Joachim Gérard (United Kingdom) Alfie Hewett | 6 | 5 | 0
