= 2015 Wimbledon Championships – Boys' singles =

Boys' singles
- 2015 Wimbledon Championships

Final
- Champion: (United States) Reilly Opelka
- Runner-up: (Sweden) Mikael Ymer
- Score: 7–6^{(7–5)}, 6–4

Events
Singles	men	women		boys	girls
Doubles	men	women	mixed	boys	girls
WC Singles	men	women	quad
WC Doubles	men	women	quad
Legends	men	women	seniors
- Wimbledon Championships

Unseeded American Reilly Opelka won the title, defeating Swede Mikael Ymer 7–6^{(7–5)}, 6–4 in the final. Opelka saved a match point in his first-round match against Alex de Minaur.

Noah Rubin was the defending champion, but was no longer eligible to participate in junior events.

== Seeds ==
1. (United States) Taylor Fritz (semifinals)
2. (South Korea) Lee Duck-hee (third round)
3. (France) Corentin Denolly (second round)
4. (United States) Michael Mmoh (third round)
5. (South Korea) Hong Seong-chan (first round)
6. (Chile) Marcelo Tomás Barrios Vera (third round)
7. (United States) Tommy Paul (quarterfinals)
8. (Norway) Viktor Durasovic (third round)
9. (Japan) Akira Santillan (second round)
10. (United States) William Blumberg (quarterfinals)
11. (South Korea) Chung Yun-seong (quarterfinals)
12. (Sweden) Mikael Ymer (final)
13. (Vietnam) Lý Hoàng Nam (first round)
14. (Norway) Casper Ruud (second round)
15. (Greece) Stefanos Tsitsipas (second round)
16. (Hungary) Máté Valkusz (second round)

== Main draw ==
Key

- Q = Qualifier
- WC = Wild card
- LL = Lucky loser
- Alt = Alternate
- ITF = ITF entry
- PR = Protected ranking
- SR = Special ranking
- SE = Special exempt
- JE = Junior exempt
- JR = Junior Accelerator Programme entrant
- CO = College Accelerator Programme entrant
- NG = Next Gen Accelerator Program entrant
- w/o = Walkover
- r = Retired
- d = Defaulted

=== Finals ===
Quarterfinals
1	(United States) Taylor Fritz	6	4	6
11	(South Korea) Chung Yun-seong	2	6	0
(United States) Reilly Opelka	6	6
10	(United States) William Blumberg	3	3
12/WC	(Sweden) Mikael Ymer	7	7^{7}
(Spain) Álvaro López San Martín	5	6^{3}
7	(United States) Tommy Paul	4	6	4
(Finland) Patrik Niklas-Salminen	6	1	6

Semifinals
1	(United States) Taylor Fritz	3	6^{13}
(United States) Reilly Opelka	6	7^{15}
12/WC	(Sweden) Mikael Ymer	7^{7}	6
(Finland) Patrik Niklas-Salminen	6^{3}	3

Final
(United States) Reilly Opelka	7^{7}	6
12/WC	(Sweden) Mikael Ymer	6^{5}	4

=== Top half ===
==== Section 1 ====
First round
1	(United States) Taylor Fritz	6	6
WC	(United Kingdom) Jay Clarke	3	2
(Japan) Sora Fukuda	2	6	6
(Germany) Tim Sandkaulen	6	3	4
(Australia) Jake Delaney	3	4
(Argentina) Franco Capalbo	6	6
(Russia) Alexander Bublik	3	7^{7}	3
15	(Greece) Stefanos Tsitsipas	6	6^{0}	6
11	(South Korea) Chung Yun-seong	7	6
(Switzerland) Marko Osmakcic	5	3
(United States) Ulises Blanch	6	6
Q	(United Kingdom) Charles Broom	1	1
(Slovakia) Lukáš Klein	6	6
Q	(Italy) Marco Mosciatti	1	3
(Poland) Hubert Hurkacz	2	2
8	(Norway) Viktor Durasovic	6	6

Second round
1	(United States) T Fritz	6	6
(Japan) S Fukuda	1	2
(Argentina) F Capalbo	6	7^{7}
15	(Greece) S Tsitsipas	3	6^{3}
11	(South Korea) Y-s Chung	6^{6}	7	6
(United States) U Blanch	7^{8}	5	2
(Slovakia) L Klein	6	3	3
8	(Norway) V Durasovic	3	6	6

Third round
1	(United States) T Fritz	6	6
(Argentina) F Capalbo	2	2
11	(South Korea) Y Chung	4	7^{7}	6
8	(Norway) V Durasovic	6	6^{2}	2

Quarterfinals
1	(United States) T Fritz	6	4	6
11	(South Korea) Y Chung	2	6	0

==== Section 2 ====
First round
3	(France) Corentin Denolly	6	6
(Estonia) Kenneth Raisma	3	4
Q	(Australia) Alex de Minaur	6	3	11
(United States) Reilly Opelka	4	6	13
(Japan) Yosuke Watanuki	7^{7}	7
WC	(United Kingdom) Alexis Canter	6^{3}	5
(Portugal) Felipe Cunha e Silva	2	2
16	(Hungary) Máté Valkusz	6	6
10	(United States) William Blumberg	6^{5}	6	6
(Uzbekistan) Jurabek Karimov	7^{7}	4	4
Q	(United Kingdom) Jonathan Gray	6^{4}	6^{11}
Q	(Philippines) Alberto Lim	7^{7}	7^{13}
Q	(United States) Emil Reinberg	6	5	8
(Italy) Federico Bonacia	4	7	6
Q	(Canada) Denis Shapovalov	7	4	6
5	(South Korea) Hong Seong-chan	5	6	3

Second round
3	(France) C Denolly	4	6	4
(United States) R Opelka	6	4	6
(Japan) Y Watanuki	6	6
16	(Hungary) M Valkusz	4	3
10	(United States) W Blumberg	6	6
Q	(Philippines) A Lim	4	1
Q	(United States) E Reinberg	2	3
Q	(Canada) D Shapovalov	6	6

Third round
(United States) R Opelka	7^{7}	6
(Japan) Y Watanuki	6^{4}	3
10	(United States) W Blumberg	6	6
Q	(Canada) D Shapovalov	4	2

Quarterfinals
(United States) R Opelka	6	6
10	(United States) W Blumberg	3	3

=== Bottom half ===
==== Section 3 ====
First round
6	(Chile) Marcelo Tomás Barrios Vera	7^{7}	6
WC	(United Kingdom) Ewan Moore	6^{2}	3
(India) Sumit Nagal	7	2	4
(Argentina) Juan Pablo Ficovich	5	6	6
(Japan) Yusuke Takahashi	6	6^{5}	6
(United States) Nathan Ponwith	4	7^{7}	8
(South Korea) Oh Chan-yeong	4	3
12/WC	(Sweden) Mikael Ymer	6	6
14	(Norway) Casper Ruud	7^{7}	6^{2}	6
(Japan) Jumpei Yamasaki	6^{2}	7^{7}	3
(Tunisia) Aziz Dougaz	6^{2}	1
(Spain) Álvaro López San Martín	7^{7}	6
WC	(United Kingdom) Ryan James Storrie	6	3	7
(Portugal) Nuno Borges	1	6	9
(France) Geoffrey Blancaneaux	3	7^{7}	5
4	(United States) Michael Mmoh	6	6^{3}	7

Second round
6	(Chile) MT Barrios Vera	6	6
(Argentina) JP Ficovich	4	4
(United States) N Ponwith	3	1
12/WC	(Sweden) M Ymer	6	6
14	(Norway) C Ruud	6^{5}	3
(Spain) Á López San Martín	7^{7}	6
(Portugal) N Borges	1	2
4	(United States) M Mmoh	6	6

Third round
6	(Chile) MT Barrios Vera	3	2
12/WC	(Sweden) M Ymer	6	6
(Spain) Á López San Martín	6	7^{7}
4	(United States) M Mmoh	3	6^{5}

Quarterfinals
12/WC	(Sweden) M Ymer	7	7^{7}
(Spain) Á López San Martín	5	6^{3}

==== Section 4 ====
First round
7	(United States) Tommy Paul	6	6
Q	(Denmark) Benjamin Hannestad	1	1
(Peru) Juan José Rosas	6	6
(Poland) Michał Dembek	3	2
(Switzerland) Johan Nikles	6	6
(Italy) Andrea Pellegrino	4	0
(Argentina) Manuel Peña López	1	4
9	(Japan) Akira Santillan	6	6
13	(Vietnam) Lý Hoàng Nam	3	4
(Finland) Patrik Niklas-Salminen	6	6
(Serbia) Miomir Kecmanović	3	6	6
WC	(United Kingdom) Finn Bass	6	3	1
(Canada) Alejandro Tabilo	5	1
(Australia) Marc Polmans	7	6
(Slovakia) Alex Molčan	1	6^{6}
2	(South Korea) Lee Duck-hee	6	7^{8}

Second round
7	(United States) T Paul	6	3	6
(Peru) JJ Rosas	4	6	2
(Switzerland) J Nikles	7^{9}	6
9	(Japan) A Santillan	6^{7}	4
(Finland) P Niklas-Salminen	6	6
(Serbia) M Kecmanović	3	3
(Australia) M Polmans	7^{8}	6^{3}	7
2	(South Korea) D Lee	6^{6}	7^{7}	9

Third round
7	(United States) T Paul	6	6
(Switzerland) J Nikles	3	1
(Finland) P Niklas-Salminen	6	6
2	(South Korea) D Lee	4	0

Quarterfinals
7	(United States) T Paul	4	6	4
(Finland) P Niklas-Salminen	6	1	6
