= 2015 Wimbledon Championships – Gentlemen's invitation doubles =

Gentlemen's invitation doubles
- 2015 Wimbledon Championships

Final
- Champions: (Croatia) Goran Ivanišević (Croatia) Ivan Ljubičić
- Runners-up: (South Africa) Wayne Ferreira (France) Sébastien Grosjean
- Score: 6–3, 1–6, [10–5]

Events
Singles	men	women		boys	girls
Doubles	men	women	mixed	boys	girls
WC Singles	men	women	quad
WC Doubles	men	women	quad
Legends	men	women	seniors
← 2014 ·	Wimbledon Championships	· 2016 →

Thomas Enqvist and Mark Philippoussis were the defending champions but Philippoussis did not compete. Enqvist played alongside Jamie Delgado but they were eliminated in the round robin.

Goran Ivanišević and Ivan Ljubičić defeated Wayne Ferreira and Sébastien Grosjean in the final, 6–3, 1–6, [10–5] to win the gentlemen's invitation doubles tennis title at the 2015 Wimbledon Championships.

== Draw ==
=== Key ===
- Q = Qualifier
- WC = Wild card
- LL = Lucky loser
- Alt = Alternate
- ITF = ITF entry
- PR = Protected ranking
- SR = Special ranking
- SE = Special exempt
- JE = Junior exempt
- JR = Junior Accelerator Programme entrant
- CO = College Accelerator Programme entrant
- NG = Next Gen Accelerator Program entrant
- w/o = Walkover
- r = Retired
- d = Defaulted

=== Final ===
Final
(South Africa) Wayne Ferreira (France) Sébastien Grosjean	3	6	[5]
(Croatia) Goran Ivanišević (Croatia) Ivan Ljubičić	6	1	[10]

=== Group A ===
		(Spain) Costa (Chile) González	(South Africa) Ferreira (France) Grosjean	(Netherlands) Krajicek (United Kingdom) Petchey	(United Kingdom) Baker (France) Santoro (United Kingdom) Rusedski	RR; W–L	Set; W–L	Game; W–L	Standings
A1	(Spain) Albert Costa (Chile) Fernando González		6–7^{(1–7)}, 7–6^{(7–5)}, [5–10]	4–6, 6–1, [10–5]	1–6, 6–2, [9–11] (w/ Baker)	1–2	4–5	31–30	3
A2	(South Africa) Wayne Ferreira (France) Sébastien Grosjean	7–6^{(7–1)}, 6–7^{(5–7)}, [10–5]		6–3, 6–4	3–6, 4–6 (w/ Baker)	2–1	4–3	33–32	2
A3	(Netherlands) Richard Krajicek (United Kingdom) Mark Petchey	6–4, 1–6, [5–10]	3–6, 4–6		5–7, 5–7 (w/ Rusedski)	0–3	1–6	24–37	4
A4	(United Kingdom) Jamie Baker (France) Fabrice Santoro (United Kingdom) Greg Rusedski	6–1, 2–6, [11–9] (w/ Baker)	6–3, 6–4 (w/ Baker)	7–5, 7–5 (w/ Rusedski)		3–0	6–1	35–24	1

Standings are determined by: 1. number of wins; 2. number of matches; 3. in two-players-ties, head-to-head records; 4. in three-players-ties, percentage of sets won, or of games won; 5. steering-committee decision.

=== Group B ===
		(Sweden) Björkman (Sweden) Johansson	(United Kingdom) Delgado (Sweden) Enqvist	(United States) Gimelstob (United Kingdom) Hutchins	(Croatia) Ivanišević (Croatia) Ljubičić	RR; W–L	Set; W–L	Game; W–L	Standings
B1	(Sweden) Jonas Björkman (Sweden) Thomas Johansson		6–3, 7–6^{(7–4)}	6–3, 2–6, [3–10]	1–6, 6–1, [7–10]	1–2	4–4	28–27	3
B2	(United Kingdom) Jamie Delgado (Sweden) Thomas Enqvist	3–6, 6–7^{(4–7)}		3–6, 6–2, [7–10]	6–3, 1–6, [8–10]	0–3	2–6	25–32	4
B3	(United States) Justin Gimelstob (United Kingdom) Ross Hutchins	3–6, 6–2, [10–3]	6–3, 2–6, [10–7]		4–6, 6–2, [6–10]	2–1	5–4	29–26	2
B4	(Croatia) Goran Ivanišević (Croatia) Ivan Ljubičić	6–1, 1–6, [10–7]	3–6, 6–1, [10–8]	6–4, 2–6, [10–6]		3–0	6–3	27–24	1

Standings are determined by: 1. number of wins; 2. number of matches; 3. in two-players-ties, head-to-head records; 4. in three-players-ties, percentage of sets won, or of games won; 5. steering-committee decision.
