= 2015 Wimbledon Championships – Ladies' invitation doubles =

Ladies' invitation doubles
- 2015 Wimbledon Championships

Final
- Champions: (Bulgaria) Magdalena Maleeva (Australia) Rennae Stubbs
- Runners-up: (United States) Martina Navratilova (Tunisia) Selima Sfar
- Score: 3–6, 7–5, [10–8]

Events
Singles	men	women		boys	girls
Doubles	men	women	mixed	boys	girls
WC Singles	men	women	quad
WC Doubles	men	women	quad
Legends	men	women	seniors
← 2014 ·	Wimbledon Championships	· 2016 →

Jana Novotná and Barbara Schett were the defending champions but were eliminated in the round robin.

Magdalena Maleeva and Rennae Stubbs defeated Martina Navratilova and Selima Sfar in the final, 3–6, 7–5, [10–8] to win the ladies' invitation doubles tennis title at the 2015 Wimbledon Championships.

== Draw ==
=== Key ===
- Q = Qualifier
- WC = Wild card
- LL = Lucky loser
- Alt = Alternate
- ITF = ITF entry
- PR = Protected ranking
- SR = Special ranking
- SE = Special exempt
- JE = Junior exempt
- JR = Junior Accelerator Programme entrant
- CO = College Accelerator Programme entrant
- NG = Next Gen Accelerator Program entrant
- w/o = Walkover
- r = Retired
- d = Defaulted

=== Final ===
Final
	(United States) Martina Navratilova (Tunisia) Selima Sfar	6	5	[8]
B2	(Bulgaria) Magdalena Maleeva (Australia) Rennae Stubbs	3	7	[10]

=== Group A ===
		(United States) Austin (Czech Republic) Suková	(France) Bartoli (Croatia) Majoli	(United States) Davenport (United States) Fernández	(United States) Navratilova (Tunisia) Sfar	RR; W–L	Set; W–L	Game; W–L	Standings
A1	(United States) Tracy Austin (Czech Republic) Helena Suková		w/o	2–6, 4–6	2–6, 2–6	0–3	0–4	10–24	4
A2	(France) Marion Bartoli (Croatia) Iva Majoli	w/o		2–6, 7–5, [2–10]	6–7^{(3–7)}, 4–6	1–2	1–4	19–25	3
A3	(United States) Lindsay Davenport (United States) Mary Joe Fernández	6–2, 6–4	6–2, 5–7, [10–2]		4–6, 1–6	2–1	4–3	29–27	2
A4	(United States) Martina Navratilova (Tunisia) Selima Sfar	6–2, 6–2	7–6^{(7–3)}, 6–4	6–4, 6–1		3–0	6–0	37–19	1

Standings are determined by: 1. number of wins; 2. number of matches; 3. in two-players-ties, head-to-head records; 4. in three-players-ties, percentage of sets won, or of games won; 5. steering-committee decision.

=== Group B ===
		(United States) Jaeger (Hungary) Temesvári	(Bulgaria) Maleeva (Australia) Stubbs	(Czech Republic) Novotná (Austria) Schett	(United States) Rubin (France) Testud	RR; W–L	Set; W–L	Game; W–L	Standings
B1	(United States) Andrea Jaeger (Hungary) Andrea Temesvári		4–6, 3–6	1–6, 5–7	6–7^{(2–7)}, 4–6	0–3	0–6	23–38	4
B2	(Bulgaria) Magdalena Maleeva (Australia) Rennae Stubbs	6–4, 6–3		7–6^{(8–6)}, 7–6^{(7–3)}	4–6, 6–3, [13–11]	3–0	6–1	37–28	1
B3	(Czech Republic) Jana Novotná (Austria) Barbara Schett	6–1, 7–5	6–7^{(6–8)}, 6–7^{(3–7)}		4–6, 6–3, [8-10]	1–2	3–4	35–30	3
B4	(United States) Chanda Rubin (France) Sandrine Testud	7–6^{(7–2)}, 6–4	6–4, 3–6, [11–13]	6–4, 3–6, [10-8]		2–1	5–3	32–31	2

Standings are determined by: 1. number of wins; 2. number of matches; 3. in two-players-ties, head-to-head records; 4. in three-players-ties, percentage of sets won, or of games won; 5. steering-committee decision.
