= 2015 Wimbledon Championships – Senior gentlemen's invitation doubles =

Senior gentlemen's invitation doubles
- 2015 Wimbledon Championships

Final
- Champions: (Netherlands) Jacco Eltingh (Netherlands) Paul Haarhuis
- Runners-up: (France) Guy Forget (France) Cédric Pioline
- Score: 6–4, 6–4

Events
Singles	men	women		boys	girls
Doubles	men	women	mixed	boys	girls
WC Singles	men	women	quad
WC Doubles	men	women	quad
Legends	men	women	seniors
← 2014 ·	Wimbledon Championships	· 2016 →

Jacco Eltingh and Paul Haarhuis defeated the defending champions Guy Forget and Cédric Pioline in the final, 6–4, 6–3 to win the senior gentlemen's invitation doubles tennis title at the 2015 Wimbledon Championships.

== Draw ==
=== Key ===
- Q = Qualifier
- WC = Wild card
- LL = Lucky loser
- Alt = Alternate
- ITF = ITF entry
- PR = Protected ranking
- SR = Special ranking
- SE = Special exempt
- JE = Junior exempt
- JR = Junior Accelerator Programme entrant
- CO = College Accelerator Programme entrant
- NG = Next Gen Accelerator Program entrant
- w/o = Walkover
- r = Retired
- d = Defaulted

=== Final ===
Final
	(Netherlands) Jacco Eltingh (Netherlands) Paul Haarhuis	6	6
B2	(France) Guy Forget (France) Cédric Pioline	4	4

=== Group A ===
		(Iran) Bahrami (France) Leconte	(United Kingdom) Castle (United States) Tarango	(Netherlands) Eltingh (Netherlands) Haarhuis	(Australia) Woodbridge (Australia) Woodforde	RR; W–L	Set; W–L	Game; W–L	Standings
A1	(Iran) Mansour Bahrami (France) Henri Leconte		3–6, 7–5, [7–10]	4–6, 5–7	3–6, 6–7^{(3–7)}	0–3	1–6	28–38	4
A2	(United Kingdom) Andrew Castle (United States) Jeff Tarango	6–3, 5–7, [10–7]		2–6, 6–7^{(1–7)}	4–6, 7–6^{(7–5)}, [13–11]	2–1	4–4	32–35	2
A3	(Netherlands) Jacco Eltingh (Netherlands) Paul Haarhuis	6–4, 7–5	6–2, 7–6^{(7–1)}		7–5, 6–4	3–0	6–0	39–26	1
A4	(Australia) Todd Woodbridge (Australia) Mark Woodforde	6–3, 7–6^{(7–3)}	6–4, 6–7^{(5–7)}, [11–13]	5–7, 4–6		1–2	3–4	34–34	3

Standings are determined by: 1. number of wins; 2. number of matches; 3. in two-players-ties, head-to-head records; 4. in three-players-ties, percentage of sets won, or of games won; 5. steering-committee decision.

=== Group B ===
		(United Kingdom) Bates (United Kingdom) Wilkinson	(France) Forget (France) Pioline	(United States) Leach (United States) McEnroe	(Sweden) Nyström (Sweden) Pernfors	RR; W–L	Set; W–L	Game; W–L	Standings
B1	(United Kingdom) Jeremy Bates (United Kingdom) Chris Wilkinson		1–6, 6–3, [10–4]	3–6, 2–6	7–5, 6–1	2–1	4–3	26–27	3
B2	(France) Guy Forget (France) Cédric Pioline	6–1, 3–6, [4–10]		6–3, 6–2	6–3, 6–3	2–1	5–2	33–19	1
B3	(United States) Rick Leach (United States) Patrick McEnroe	6–3, 6–2	3–6, 2–6		6–2, 7–5	2–1	4–2	30–24	2
B4	(Sweden) Joakim Nyström (Sweden) Mikael Pernfors	5–7, 1–6	3–6, 3–6	2–6, 5–7		0–3	0–6	19–38	4

Standings are determined by: 1. number of wins; 2. number of matches; 3. in two-players-ties, head-to-head records; 4. in three-players-ties, percentage of sets won, or of games won; 5. steering-committee decision.
