= 2015 Wimbledon Championships – Mixed doubles =

Mixed doubles
- 2015 Wimbledon Championships

Final
- Champions: (India) Leander Paes (Switzerland) Martina Hingis
- Runners-up: (Austria) Alexander Peya (Hungary) Tímea Babos
- Score: 6–1, 6–1

Details
- Draw: 48
- Seeds: 16

Events
Singles	men	women		boys	girls
Doubles	men	women	mixed	boys	girls
WC Singles	men	women	quad
WC Doubles	men	women	quad
Legends	men	women	seniors
- Wimbledon Championships

Nenad Zimonjić and Samantha Stosur were the defending champions, but Stosur chose not to participate this year. Zimonjić played alongside Jarmila Gajdošová, but lost in the third round to Robert Lindstedt and Anabel Medina Garrigues.

Seventh seeded Leander Paes and Martina Hingis won the title, defeating Alexander Peya and Tímea Babos in the final 6–1, 6–1.

== Seeds ==
All seeds received a bye into the second round.

1. (United States) Mike Bryan / (United States) Bethanie Mattek-Sands (semifinals)
2. (Brazil) Bruno Soares / (India) Sania Mirza (quarterfinals)
3. (Poland) Marcin Matkowski / (Russia) Elena Vesnina (quarterfinals)
4. (United States) Bob Bryan / (France) Caroline Garcia (second round)
5. (Austria) Alexander Peya / (Hungary) Tímea Babos (final)
6. (Romania) Horia Tecău / (Slovenia) Katarina Srebotnik (quarterfinals)
7. (India) Leander Paes / (Switzerland) Martina Hingis (champions)
8. (Canada) Daniel Nestor / (France) Kristina Mladenovic (quarterfinals)
9. (Colombia) Juan Sebastián Cabal / (Zimbabwe) Cara Black (third round)
10. (South Africa) Raven Klaasen / (United States) Raquel Kops-Jones (third round)
11. (Netherlands) Jean-Julien Rojer / (Germany) Anna-Lena Grönefeld (second round)
12. (Uruguay) Pablo Cuevas / (Italy) Flavia Pennetta (withdrew)
13. (Romania) Florin Mergea / (Netherlands) Michaëlla Krajicek (second round)
14. (Australia) John Peers / (Chinese Taipei) Chan Yung-jan (second round)
15. (Finland) Henri Kontinen / (China) Zheng Jie (second round)
16. (Poland) Łukasz Kubot / (Czech Republic) Andrea Hlaváčková (third round)
17. (Spain) David Marrero / (Spain) Arantxa Parra Santonja (second round)

Click on the seed number of a player to go to their draw section.

== Draw ==
Key

- Q = Qualifier
- WC = Wild card
- LL = Lucky loser
- Alt = Alternate
- ITF = ITF entry
- PR = Protected ranking
- SR = Special ranking
- SE = Special exempt
- JE = Junior exempt
- JR = Junior Accelerator Programme entrant
- CO = College Accelerator Programme entrant
- NG = Next Gen Accelerator Program entrant
- w/o = Walkover
- r = Retired
- d = Defaulted

=== Finals ===
Quarterfinals
1	(United States) Mike Bryan (United States) Bethanie Mattek-Sands	7^{7}	6
8	(Canada) Daniel Nestor (France) Kristina Mladenovic	6^{2}	2
3	(Poland) Marcin Matkowski (Russia) Elena Vesnina	2	1
7	(India) Leander Paes (Switzerland) Martina Hingis	6	6
6	(Romania) Horia Tecău (Slovenia) Katarina Srebotnik	4	6	3
(Sweden) Robert Lindstedt (Spain) Anabel Medina Garrigues	6	1	6
5	(Austria) Alexander Peya (Hungary) Tímea Babos	3	7^{8}	9
2	(Brazil) Bruno Soares (India) Sania Mirza	6	6^{6}	7

Semifinals
1	(United States) Mike Bryan (United States) Bethanie Mattek-Sands	3	4
7	(India) Leander Paes (Switzerland) Martina Hingis	6	6
(Sweden) Robert Lindstedt (Spain) Anabel Medina Garrigues	6	3	9
5	(Austria) Alexander Peya (Hungary) Tímea Babos	4	6	11

Final
7	(India) Leander Paes (Switzerland) Martina Hingis	6	6
5	(Austria) Alexander Peya (Hungary) Tímea Babos	1	1

=== Top half ===
==== Section 1 ====
First round
(India) M Bhupathi (Russia) A Kudryavtseva	7	3	2
(United States) N Monroe (United States) M Brengle	5	6	6
Alt	(New Zealand) M Venus (Romania) R Olaru	6	6
(Brazil) A Sá (Spain) L Arruabarrena	3	2
WC	(Australia) L Hewitt (Australia) C Dellacqua	6	6
(Mexico) S González (United States) A Spears	4	2
(Pakistan) A-u-H Qureshi (Russia) V Dushevina	6^{5}	5
WC	(United Kingdom) K Skupski (United Kingdom) J Konta	7^{7}	7

Second round
1	(United States) M Bryan (United States) B Mattek-Sands	6	6
(United States) N Monroe (United States) M Brengle	4	1
Alt	(New Zealand) M Venus (Romania) R Olaru	6	6
15	(Finland) H Kontinen (China) J Zheng	4	2
9	(Colombia) JS Cabal (Zimbabwe) C Black	0	6	6
WC	(Australia) L Hewitt (Australia) C Dellacqua	6	3	3
WC	(United Kingdom) K Skupski (United Kingdom) J Konta	7	1	4
8	(Canada) D Nestor (France) K Mladenovic	5	6	6

Third round
1	(United States) M Bryan (United States) B Mattek-Sands	7^{7}	7
Alt	(New Zealand) M Venus (Romania) R Olaru	6^{3}	5
9	(Colombia) JS Cabal (Zimbabwe) C Black	3	7^{7}	3
8	(Canada) D Nestor (France) K Mladenovic	6	6^{4}	6

Quarterfinals
1	(United States) M Bryan (United States) B Mattek-Sands	7^{7}	6
8	(Canada) D Nestor (France) K Mladenovic	6^{2}	2

==== Section 2 ====
First round
WC	(United Kingdom) N Skupski (United States) L Raymond	6^{5}	6^{4}
(Croatia) I Dodig (Australia) A Tomljanović	7^{7}	7^{7}
(Austria) J Melzer (Czech Republic) B Strýcová	3	6^{3}
(Australia) N Kyrgios (United States) M Keys	6	7^{7}
(New Zealand) A Sitak (Australia) An Rodionova	6	6
WC	(United Kingdom) J Marray (United Kingdom) A Smith	4	4
(Canada) A Shamasdin (Canada) G Dabrowski	4	3
(France) É Roger-Vasselin (France) A Cornet	6	6

Second round
3	(Poland) M Matkowski (Russia) E Vesnina	6	6
(Croatia) I Dodig (Australia) A Tomljanović	4	2
(Australia) N Kyrgios (United States) M Keys	6	6^{2}	8
16	(Poland) Ł Kubot (Czech Republic) A Hlaváčková	3	7^{7}	10
11	(Netherlands) J-J Rojer (Germany) A-L Grönefeld	4	7^{7}	3
(New Zealand) A Sitak (Australia) An Rodionova	6	6^{1}	6
(France) É Roger-Vasselin (France) A Cornet	4	2
7	(India) L Paes (Switzerland) M Hingis	6	6

Third round
3	(Poland) M Matkowski (Russia) E Vesnina	6^{4}	6	11
16	(Poland) Ł Kubot (Czech Republic) A Hlaváčková	7^{7}	4	9
(New Zealand) A Sitak (Australia) An Rodionova	2	2
7	(India) L Paes (Switzerland) M Hingis	6	6

Quarterfinals
3	(Poland) M Matkowski (Russia) E Vesnina	2	1
7	(India) L Paes (Switzerland) M Hingis	6	6

=== Bottom half ===
==== Section 3 ====
First round
(United States) E Butorac (Hungary) K Marosi	6^{9}	7	5
(India) R Bopanna (Spain) MJ Martínez Sánchez	7^{11}	5	7
(Poland) M Fyrstenberg (Poland) K Jans-Ignacik	6	6^{4}	7
(United States) S Lipsky (Chinese Taipei) H-c Chan	3	7^{7}	5
(Ukraine) S Stakhovsky (Poland) A Rosolska	6^{6}	2
(Sweden) R Lindstedt (Spain) A Medina Garrigues	7^{8}	6
(Serbia) N Zimonjić (Australia) J Gajdošová	6	7
(Australia) C Guccione (Slovenia) A Klepač	3	5

Second round
6	(Romania) H Tecău (Slovenia) K Srebotnik	6	6
(India) R Bopanna (Spain) MJ Martínez Sánchez	2	4
(Poland) M Fyrstenberg (Poland) K Jans-Ignacik
10	(South Africa) R Klaasen (United States) R Kops-Jones	w/o
13	(Romania) F Mergea (Netherlands) M Krajicek	6	3	2
(Sweden) R Lindstedt (Spain) A Medina Garrigues	3	6	6
(Serbia) N Zimonjić (Australia) J Gajdošová	3	6	9
4	(United States) B Bryan (France) C Garcia	6	3	7

Third round
6	(Romania) H Tecău (Slovenia) K Srebotnik	6	7
10	(South Africa) R Klaasen (United States) R Kops-Jones	3	5
(Sweden) R Lindstedt (Spain) A Medina Garrigues	6	7^{7}
(Serbia) N Zimonjić (Australia) J Gajdošová	4	6^{3}

Quarterfinals
6	(Romania) H Tecău (Slovenia) K Srebotnik	4	6	3
(Sweden) R Lindstedt (Spain) A Medina Garrigues	6	1	6

==== Section 4 ====
First round
(Austria) P Oswald (Switzerland) B Bencic	6	6
(United Kingdom) D Inglot (Ukraine) E Svitolina	2	3
Alt	(Austria) O Marach (Ukraine) O Savchuk	6^{5}	7^{7}	6
(Belarus) M Mirnyi (United Kingdom) H Watson	7^{7}	6^{4}	4
(Croatia) M Draganja (Croatia) A Konjuh	6	6^{5}	6
WC	(United Kingdom) C Fleming (United Kingdom) J Rae	3	7^{7}	1
(United States) R Ram (Australia) Ar Rodionova	5	3
(Germany) A Begemann (Slovakia) J Husárová	7	6

Second round
5	(Austria) A Peya (Hungary) T Babos	6	6^{5}	7
(Austria) P Oswald (Switzerland) B Bencic	2	7^{7}	5
Alt	(Austria) O Marach (Ukraine) O Savchuk	3	6	6
17	(Spain) D Marrero (Spain) A Parra Santonja	6	3	2
14	(Australia) J Peers (Chinese Taipei) Y-j Chan	6^{6}	6^{9}
(Croatia) M Draganja (Croatia) A Konjuh	7^{8}	7^{11}
(Germany) A Begemann (Slovakia) J Husárová	2	4
2	(Brazil) B Soares (India) S Mirza	6	6

Third round
5	(Austria) A Peya (Hungary) T Babos	6	7^{8}
Alt	(Austria) O Marach (Ukraine) O Savchuk	3	6^{6}
(Croatia) M Draganja (Croatia) A Konjuh	3	7^{7}	3
2	(Brazil) B Soares (India) S Mirza	6	6^{5}	6

Quarterfinals
5	(Austria) A Peya (Hungary) T Babos	3	7^{8}	9
2	(Brazil) B Soares (India) S Mirza	6	6^{6}	7
