= 2015 Wimbledon Championships =

- Date: 29 June – 12 July
- Edition: 129th
- Category: Grand Slam (ITF)
- Draw: 128S / 64D / 48XD
- Prize money: £26,750,000
- Surface: Grass
- Location: Church Road; SW19, Wimbledon, London, United Kingdom
- Venue: All England Lawn Tennis and Croquet Club

Champions

Men's singles
- (Serbia) Novak Djokovic

Women's singles
- (United States) Serena Williams

Men's doubles
- (Netherlands) Jean-Julien Rojer / (Romania) Horia Tecău

Women's doubles
- (Switzerland) Martina Hingis / (India) Sania Mirza

Mixed doubles
- (India) Leander Paes / (Switzerland) Martina Hingis

Wheelchair men's doubles
- (Argentina) Gustavo Fernández / (France) Nicolas Peifer

Wheelchair women's doubles
- (Japan) Yui Kamiji / (United Kingdom) Jordanne Whiley

Boys' singles
- (United States) Reilly Opelka

Girls' singles
- (Russia) Sofya Zhuk

Boys' doubles
- (Vietnam) Lý Hoàng Nam / (India) Sumit Nagal

Girls' doubles
- (Hungary) Dalma Gálfi / (Hungary) Fanny Stollár

Gentlemen's invitation doubles
- (Croatia) Goran Ivanišević / (Croatia) Ivan Ljubičić

Ladies' invitation doubles
- (Bulgaria) Magdalena Maleeva / (Australia) Rennae Stubbs

Senior gentlemen's invitation doubles
- (Netherlands) Jacco Eltingh / (Netherlands) Paul Haarhuis
- Wimbledon Championships

The 2015 Wimbledon Championships was a Grand Slam tennis tournament which took place at the All England Lawn Tennis and Croquet Club in Wimbledon, London, United Kingdom, from 29 June to 12 July 2015.

It was the 129th edition of the championships, the 48th in the Open Era and the third Grand Slam tournament of the year, played on grass courts and part of the ATP World Tour, the WTA Tour, the ITF Junior Tour and the NEC Tour. They were organised by the All England Lawn Tennis Club and the International Tennis Federation. The tournament was held one week later than in previous seasons, giving a three-week gap from the end of the 2015 French Open. The change, announced in 2012, is intended to provide players more time for recuperation and preparatory grass-court tournaments.

Novak Djokovic of Serbia won his third Wimbledon title in men's singles, defending his championship from 2014. Petra Kvitová of the Czech Republic was the defending champion in women's singles, but she lost to Jelena Janković in the third round.

Serena Williams won her sixth Wimbledon and 21st major title, defeating first-time finalist Garbiñe Muguruza in the final, 6–4, 6–4. She also achieved her second non-calendar year Grand Slam after winning the 2014 US Open, 2015 Australian Open and 2015 French Open. With this win, Williams also became the oldest woman to win a Grand Slam singles title in the Open Era at 33 years and 289 days old, beating Martina Navratilova by 26 days, who won the 1990 Wimbledon Championships at 33 years and 263 days old.

== Tournament ==
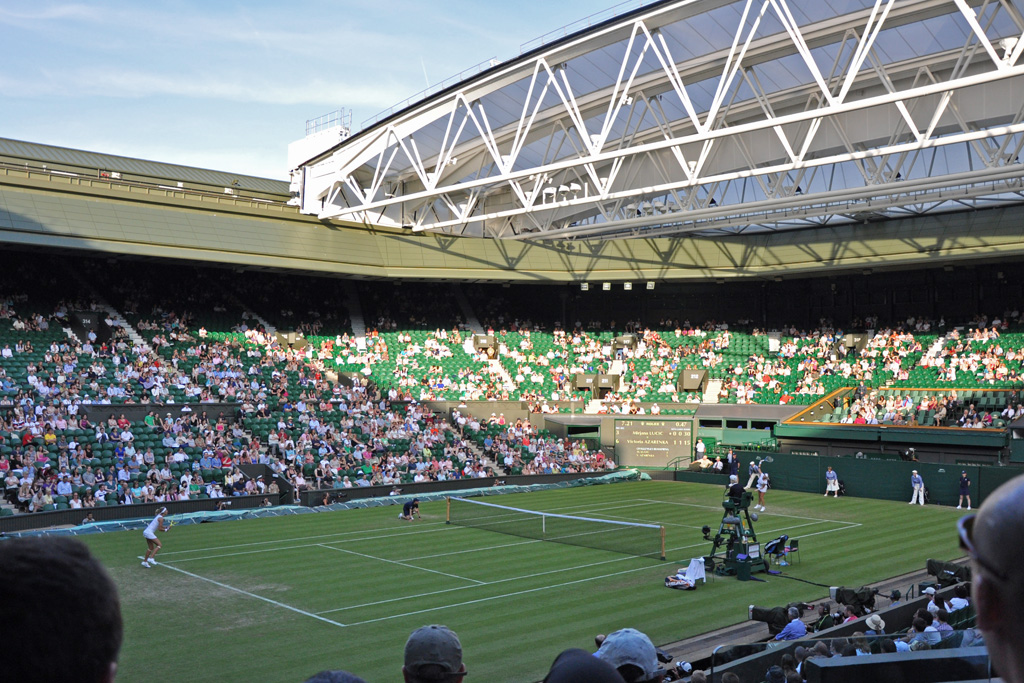
Centre Court where the Finals of Wimbledon take place.

The 2015 Wimbledon Championships was the 129th edition of the tournament and was held at All England Lawn Tennis and Croquet Club in London.

The tournament was an event run by the International Tennis Federation (ITF) and is part of the 2015 ATP World Tour and the 2015 WTA Tour calendars under the Grand Slam category. The tournament consisted of both men's and women's singles and doubles draws as well as a mixed doubles event. There were singles and doubles events for both boys and girls (players under 18), which were part of the Grade A category of tournaments, and doubles events for men's and women's wheelchair tennis players as part of the NEC tour under the Grand Slam category. The tournament was played on grass courts and took place over a series of 19 courts, including the four main showcourts, Centre Court, No. 1 Court, No. 2 Court and No. 3 Court.

== Point and prize money distribution ==
=== Point distribution ===
Below is a series of tables for each of the competitions showing the ranking points on offer for each event.

==== Senior points ====
Event	W	F	SF	QF	Round of 16	Round of 32	Round of 64	Round of 128	Q	Q3	Q2	Q1
Men's singles	2000	1200	720	360	180	90	45	10	25	16	8	0
Men's doubles	2000	1200	720	360	180	90	0	—	—	—	—	—
Women's singles	2000	1300	780	430	240	130	70	10	40	30	20	2
Women's doubles	2000	1300	780	430	240	130	10	—	—	—	—	—

==== Wheelchair points ====
Event	W	F	3rd	4th
Doubles	800	500	375	100

==== Junior points ====
Event	W	F	SF	QF	Round of 16	Round of 32	Q	Q2	Q1
Boys' singles	375	270	180	120	75	30	25	20	0
Girls' singles	375	270	180	120	75	30	25	20	0
Boys' doubles	270	180	120	75	45	—	—	—	—
Girls' doubles	270	180	120	75	45	—	—	—	—

=== Prize money ===
The Wimbledon total prize money for 2015 was increased by 7% to £26.75m. The winners of the men's and women's singles titles would earn £1.88m, up £120,000 from the previous year. The figures for doubles events are per pair.

Event	W	F	SF	QF	Round of 16	Round of 32	Round of 64	Round of 128	Q3	Q2	Q1
Singles	£1,880,000	£940,000	£470,000	£241,000	£127,000	£77,000	£47,000	£29,000	£14,500	£7,250	£3,625
Doubles	£340,000	£170,000	£85,000	£43,000	£22,500	£13,750	£9,000	—	—	—	—
Mixed doubles	£100,000	£50,000	£25,000	£12,000	£6,000	£3,000	£1,500	—	—	—	—
Wheelchair doubles	£15,000	£7,750	£5,250	£4,000	—	—	—	—	—	—	—
Invitation doubles	£22,000	£19,000	£16,000	£15,000	£14,000	—	—	—	—	—	—

== Singles players ==
2015 Wimbledon Championships – Men's singles

Champion		Runner-up	
(Serbia) Novak Djokovic [1]		(Switzerland) Roger Federer [2]	
Semifinals out
(France) Richard Gasquet [21]		(United Kingdom) Andy Murray [3]	
Quarterfinals out
(Croatia) Marin Čilić [9]	(Switzerland) Stan Wawrinka [4]	(Canada) Vasek Pospisil	(France) Gilles Simon [12]
4th round out
(South Africa) Kevin Anderson [14]	(United States) Denis Kudla (WC)	(Belgium) David Goffin [16]	(Australia) Nick Kyrgios [26]
(Serbia) Viktor Troicki [22]	(Croatia) Ivo Karlović [23]	(Czech Republic) Tomáš Berdych [6]	(Spain) Roberto Bautista Agut [20]
3rd round out
(Australia) Bernard Tomic [27]	(Argentina) Leonardo Mayer [24]	(United States) John Isner [17]	(Colombia) Santiago Giraldo
(Spain) Fernando Verdasco	(Cyprus) Marcos Baghdatis	(Bulgaria) Grigor Dimitrov [11]	(Canada) Milos Raonic [7]
(United Kingdom) James Ward (WC)	(Germany) Dustin Brown (Q)	(France) Jo-Wilfried Tsonga [13]	(Italy) Andreas Seppi [25]
(Spain) Pablo Andújar	(France) Gaël Monfils [18]	(Georgia (country)) Nikoloz Basilashvili (Q)	(Australia) Sam Groth
2nd round out
(Finland) Jarkko Nieminen	(France) Pierre-Hugues Herbert (Q)	(Spain) Marcel Granollers	(Turkey) Marsel İlhan
(Lithuania) Ričardas Berankis	(Australia) Matthew Ebden (WC)	(Germany) Alexander Zverev	(Japan) Kei Nishikori [5]
(Dominican Republic) Víctor Estrella Burgos	(Austria) Dominic Thiem [32]	(Australia) John Millman (Q)	(United Kingdom) Liam Broady (WC)
(United States) Steve Johnson	(France) Kenny de Schepper (Q)	(Argentina) Juan Mónaco	(Germany) Tommy Haas (PR)
(Czech Republic) Jiří Veselý	(Italy) Fabio Fognini [30]	(United Kingdom) Aljaž Bedene	(Spain) Rafael Nadal [10]
(Spain) Albert Ramos	(Ukraine) Alexandr Dolgopolov	(Croatia) Borna Ćorić	(Netherlands) Robin Haase
(France) Nicolas Mahut (WC)	(Czech Republic) Lukáš Rosol	(France) Adrian Mannarino	(Slovenia) Blaž Kavčič
(Spain) Feliciano López [15]	(France) Benoît Paire	(Australia) James Duckworth	(United States) Sam Querrey
1st round out
(Germany) Philipp Kohlschreiber	(Australia) Lleyton Hewitt (WC)	(South Korea) Chung Hyeon	(Germany) Jan-Lennard Struff
(Australia) Thanasi Kokkinakis	(Serbia) Janko Tipsarević (PR)	(Poland) Jerzy Janowicz	(France) Lucas Pouille
(Japan) Hiroki Moriya (Q)	(Austria) Andreas Haider-Maurer	(Slovenia) Blaž Rola	(Japan) Go Soeda
(Uruguay) Pablo Cuevas [28]	(Russia) Teymuraz Gabashvili	(Brazil) João Souza	(Italy) Simone Bolelli
(Portugal) João Sousa	(Germany) Benjamin Becker	(Slovakia) Martin Kližan	(Israel) Dudi Sela
(Spain) Tommy Robredo [19]	(United States) Donald Young	(Australia) Marinko Matosevic	(Argentina) Horacio Zeballos (Q)
(Argentina) Federico Delbonis	(Slovakia) Lukáš Lacko	(Australia) John-Patrick Smith (Q)	(Australia) Luke Saville (Q)
(Argentina) Diego Schwartzman	(Germany) Florian Mayer (PR)	(Serbia) Dušan Lajović	(Spain) Daniel Gimeno Traver
(Italy) Luca Vanni (LL)	(Italy) Paolo Lorenzi	(France) Vincent Millot (Q)	(United States) Tim Smyczek
(Kazakhstan) Aleksandr Nedovyesov (Q)	(Czech Republic) Radek Štěpánek (PR)	(Chinese Taipei) Lu Yen-hsun	(Brazil) Thomaz Bellucci
(Luxembourg) Gilles Müller	(Uzbekistan) Denis Istomin	(United Kingdom) Kyle Edmund (WC)	(Sweden) Elias Ymer (Q)
(United Kingdom) Brydan Klein (WC)	(Ukraine) Sergiy Stakhovsky	(Colombia) Alejandro Falla (Q)	(Kazakhstan) Mikhail Kukushkin
(France) Jérémy Chardy	(Serbia) Filip Krajinović	(Latvia) Ernests Gulbis	(Spain) Guillermo García López [29]
(Spain) Pablo Carreño Busta	(Germany) Michael Berrer (Q)	(Japan) Yūichi Sugita (Q)	(Spain) Nicolás Almagro (PR)
(Belgium) Steve Darcis	(Argentina) Facundo Bagnis	(Russia) Mikhail Youzhny	(Belgium) Ruben Bemelmans
(United States) Jack Sock [31]	(Tunisia) Malek Jaziri	(Netherlands) Igor Sijsling (Q)	(Bosnia and Herzegovina) Damir Džumhur

2015 Wimbledon Championships – Women's singles

Champion		Runner-up	
(United States) Serena Williams [1]		(Spain) Garbiñe Muguruza [20]	
Semifinals out
(Russia) Maria Sharapova [4]		(Poland) Agnieszka Radwańska [13]	
Quarterfinals out
(Belarus) Victoria Azarenka [23]	(United States) CoCo Vandeweghe	(Switzerland) Timea Bacsinszky [15]	(United States) Madison Keys [21]
4th round out
(United States) Venus Williams [16]	(Switzerland) Belinda Bencic [30]	(Kazakhstan) Zarina Diyas	(Czech Republic) Lucie Šafářová [6]
(Denmark) Caroline Wozniacki [5]	(Romania) Monica Niculescu	(Belarus) Olga Govortsova (Q)	(Serbia) Jelena Janković [28]
3rd round out
(United Kingdom) Heather Watson	(Serbia) Aleksandra Krunić	(France) Kristina Mladenovic	(United States) Bethanie Mattek-Sands (Q)
(Romania) Irina-Camelia Begu [29]	(Germany) Andrea Petkovic [14]	(Australia) Samantha Stosur [22]	(United States) Sloane Stephens
(Italy) Camila Giorgi [31]	(Germany) Angelique Kerber [10]	(Germany) Sabine Lisicki [18]	(Czech Republic) Kristýna Plíšková
(Slovakia) Magdaléna Rybáriková	(Germany) Tatjana Maria	(Australia) Casey Dellacqua	(Czech Republic) Petra Kvitová [2]
2nd round out
(Hungary) Tímea Babos	(Slovakia) Daniela Hantuchová	(Italy) Sara Errani [19]	(Kazakhstan) Yulia Putintseva
(Latvia) Jeļena Ostapenko (WC)	(Belgium) Kirsten Flipkens	(Germany) Anna-Lena Friedsam	(Serbia) Ana Ivanovic [7]
(Netherlands) Richèl Hogenkamp (Q)	(Ukraine) Lesia Tsurenko	(Belarus) Aliaksandra Sasnovich (Q)	(Colombia) Mariana Duque Mariño
(Czech Republic) Karolína Plíšková [11]	(Poland) Urszula Radwańska	(United States) Lauren Davis	(Chinese Taipei) Hsieh Su-wei (Q)
(Czech Republic) Denisa Allertová	(Spain) Lara Arruabarrena	(Croatia) Mirjana Lučić-Baroni	(Russia) Anastasia Pavlyuchenkova
(Spain) Sílvia Soler Espinosa	(United States) Christina McHale	(Russia) Svetlana Kuznetsova [26]	(Slovakia) Jana Čepelová
(Russia) Ekaterina Makarova [8]	(France) Alizé Cornet [25]	(Russia) Elizaveta Kulichkova	(China) Duan Yingying (Q)
(Australia) Ajla Tomljanović	(Ukraine) Elina Svitolina [17]	(Russia) Evgeniya Rodina	(Japan) Kurumi Nara
1st round out
(Russia) Margarita Gasparyan (Q)	(Czech Republic) Petra Cetkovská (Q)	(Slovakia) Dominika Cibulková	(France) Caroline Garcia [32]
(Italy) Francesca Schiavone	(Italy) Roberta Vinci	(New Zealand) Marina Erakovic	(United States) Madison Brengle
(Spain) Carla Suárez Navarro [9]	(Romania) Alexandra Dulgheru	(Germany) Annika Beck	(Estonia) Anett Kontaveit (WC)
(Bulgaria) Tsvetana Pironkova	(Russia) Vitalia Diatchenko	(Belgium) Alison Van Uytvanck	(China) Xu Yifan (Q)
(United Kingdom) Johanna Konta (WC)	(China) Wang Qiang	(United States) Nicole Gibbs	(Australia) Daria Gavrilova
(Italy) Flavia Pennetta [24]	(China) Zhu Lin	(United Kingdom) Naomi Broady (WC)	(United States) Shelby Rogers
(United States) Irina Falconi	(Slovakia) Anna Karolína Schmiedlová	(United States) Edina Gallovits-Hall (PR)	(Montenegro) Danka Kovinić
(Czech Republic) Barbora Strýcová [27]	(Slovenia) Polona Hercog	(Estonia) Kaia Kanepi	(United States) Alison Riske
(China) Zheng Saisai	(Czech Republic) Kateřina Siniaková	(France) Pauline Parmentier	(Brazil) Teliana Pereira
(United States) Varvara Lepchenko	(Kazakhstan) Yaroslava Shvedova	(Germany) Mona Barthel	(Germany) Carina Witthöft
(Germany) Julia Görges	(Bulgaria) Sesil Karatantcheva	(Sweden) Johanna Larsson	(Australia) Jarmila Gajdošová
(Germany) Laura Siegemund (Q)	(Czech Republic) Tereza Smitková	(Puerto Rico) Monica Puig	(Romania) Simona Halep [3]
(United States) Sachia Vickery (Q)	(Italy) Karin Knapp	(Romania) Andreea Mitu	(Croatia) Ana Konjuh
(Switzerland) Stefanie Vögele	(Belgium) Yanina Wickmayer	(Serbia) Bojana Jovanovski	(Canada) Eugenie Bouchard [12]
(Czech Republic) Lucie Hradecká	(Czech Republic) Klára Koukalová	(Austria) Tamira Paszek (Q)	(Japan) Misaki Doi
(Russia) Elena Vesnina	(United Kingdom) Laura Robson (WC)	(Poland) Magda Linette	(Netherlands) Kiki Bertens

== Singles seeds ==
Seedings were announced on Wednesday, 24 June 2015.

=== Gentlemen's singles ===
Seeds are adjusted on a surface-based system to reflect more accurately the individual player's grass court achievement as per the following formula, which applies to the top 32 players according to the ATP rankings on 22 June 2015:

- Take Entry System Position points at 22 June 2015.
- Add 100% points earned for all grass court tournaments in the past 12 months (16 June 2014 – 21 June 2015).
- Add 75% points earned for best grass court tournament in the 12 months before that (17 June 2013 – 15 June 2014).

Rank and points before in the following table are as of 29 June 2015.
Because the tournament takes place one week later than in 2014, points defending includes results from both the 2014 Wimbledon Championships and tournaments from the week of 7 July 2014 (Newport, Båstad and Stuttgart).

Seed	Rank	Player	Points before	Points defending	Points won	Points after	Status
1	1	(Serbia) Novak Djokovic	13,845	2,000	2,000	13,845	Champion, won against (Switzerland) Roger Federer [2]
2	2	(Switzerland) Roger Federer	9,665	1,200	1,200	9,665	Runner-up, lost to (Serbia) Novak Djokovic [1]
3	3	(United Kingdom) Andy Murray	7,450	360	720	7,810	Semifinals lost to (Switzerland) Roger Federer [2]
4	4	(Switzerland) Stan Wawrinka	5,790	360	360	5,790	Quarterfinals lost to (France) Richard Gasquet [21]
5	5	(Japan) Kei Nishikori	5,660	180	45	5,525	Second round withdrew due to a calf injury
6	6	(Czech Republic) Tomáš Berdych	5,050	90	180	5,140	Fourth round lost to (France) Gilles Simon [12]
7	8	(Canada) Milos Raonic	4,440	720	90	3,810	Third round lost to (Australia) Nick Kyrgios [26]
~~8~~	~~7~~	(Spain) ~~David Ferrer~~	4,490	45	0	4,445	Withdrew due to elbow injury
9	9	(Croatia) Marin Čilić	3,540	360	360	3,540	Quarterfinals lost to (Serbia) Novak Djokovic [1]
10	10	(Spain) Rafael Nadal	3,135	180	45	3,000	Second round lost to (Germany) Dustin Brown [Q]
11	11	(Bulgaria) Grigor Dimitrov	2,600	720	90	1,970	Third round lost to (France) Richard Gasquet [21]
12	13	(France) Gilles Simon	2,435	90	360	2,705	Quarterfinals lost to (Switzerland) Roger Federer [2]
13	12	(France) Jo-Wilfried Tsonga	2,565	180	90	2,475	Third round lost to (Croatia) Ivo Karlović [23]
14	14	(South Africa) Kevin Anderson	2,090	180	180	2,090	Fourth round lost to (Serbia) Novak Djokovic [1]
15	16	(Spain) Feliciano López	1,935	180	45	1,800	Second round lost to (Georgia (country)) Nikoloz Basilashvili [Q]
16	15	(Belgium) David Goffin	2,010	10+90	180+55	2,145	Fourth round lost to (Switzerland) Stan Wawrinka [4]
17	17	(United States) John Isner	1,890	90	90	1,890	Third round lost to (Croatia) Marin Čilić [9]
18	18	(France) Gaël Monfils	1,885	45	90	1,930	Third round lost to (France) Gilles Simon [12]
19	19	(Spain) Tommy Robredo	1,710	180	10	1,540	First round lost to (Australia) John Millman [Q]
20	22	(Spain) Roberto Bautista Agut	1,545	90+250	180+90	1,475	Fourth round lost to (Switzerland) Roger Federer [2]
21	20	(France) Richard Gasquet	1,610	45	720	2,285	Semifinals lost to (Serbia) Novak Djokovic [1]
22	24	(Serbia) Viktor Troicki	1,494	(45)^{†}	180	1,629	Fourth round lost to (Canada) Vasek Pospisil
23	25	(Croatia) Ivo Karlović	1,385	10+150	180+45	1,450	Fourth round lost to (United Kingdom) Andy Murray [3]
24	21	(Argentina) Leonardo Mayer	1,605	180	90	1,515	Third round lost to (South Africa) Kevin Anderson [14]
25	27	(Italy) Andreas Seppi	1,280	10	90	1,360	Third round lost to (United Kingdom) Andy Murray [3]
26	29	(Australia) Nick Kyrgios	1,245	360	180	1,065	Fourth round lost to (France) Richard Gasquet [21]
27	26	(Australia) Bernard Tomic	1,355	45	90	1,400	Third round lost to (Serbia) Novak Djokovic [1]
28	23	(Uruguay) Pablo Cuevas	1,502	10+250	10+45	1,297	First round lost to (United States) Denis Kudla [WC]
29	32	(Spain) Guillermo García López	1,210	10	10	1,210	First round lost to (Spain) Pablo Andújar
30	28	(Italy) Fabio Fognini	1,250	90+90	45+45	1,160	Second round lost to (Canada) Vasek Pospisil
31	31	(United States) Jack Sock	1,215	45+90	10+0	1,090	First round lost to (Australia) Sam Groth
32	30	(Austria) Dominic Thiem	1,235	10	45	1,270	Second round lost to (Spain) Fernando Verdasco

† The player did not qualify for the tournament in 2014. Accordingly, points for his 18th best result are deducted instead.

=== Ladies' singles ===
Seeds are based on the WTA rankings as of 22 June 2015. Rank and points before in the following table are as of 29 June 2015.
Because the tournament takes place one week later than in 2014, points defending includes results from both the 2014 Wimbledon Championships and tournaments from the week of 7 July 2014 (Bucharest and Bad Gastein).

Seed	Rank	Player	Points before	Points defending	Points won	Points after	Status
1	1	(United States) Serena Williams	11,291	130	2,000	13,161	Champion, won against (Spain) Garbiñe Muguruza [20]
2	2	(Czech Republic) Petra Kvitová	6,870	2,000	130	5,000	Third round lost to (Serbia) Jelena Janković [28]
3	3	(Romania) Simona Halep	6,200	780+280	10+1	5,151	First round lost to (Slovakia) Jana Čepelová
4	4	(Russia) Maria Sharapova	5,950	240	780	6,490	Semifinals lost to (United States) Serena Williams [1]
5	5	(Denmark) Caroline Wozniacki	5,000	240	240	5,000	Fourth round lost to (Spain) Garbiñe Muguruza [20]
6	6	(Czech Republic) Lucie Šafářová	4,055	780	240	3,515	Fourth round lost to (United States) CoCo Vandeweghe
7	7	(Serbia) Ana Ivanovic	3,895	130	70	3,835	Second round lost to (United States) Bethanie Mattek-Sands [Q]
8	8	(Russia) Ekaterina Makarova	3,575	430	70	3,215	Second round lost to (Slovakia) Magdaléna Rybáriková
9	9	(Spain) Carla Suárez Navarro	3,345	70	10	3,285	First round lost to (Latvia) Jeļena Ostapenko [WC]
10	10	(Germany) Angelique Kerber	3,285	430	130	2,985	Third round lost to (Spain) Garbiñe Muguruza [20]
11	11	(Czech Republic) Karolína Plíšková	3,210	70	70	3,210	Second round lost to (United States) CoCo Vandeweghe
12	12	(Canada) Eugenie Bouchard	3,172	1,300	10	1,882	First round lost to (China) Duan Yingying [Q]
13	13	(Poland) Agnieszka Radwańska	3,020	240	780	3,560	Semifinals lost to (Spain) Garbiñe Muguruza [20]
14	14	(Germany) Andrea Petkovic	2,705	130+280	130+55	2,480	Third round lost to (Kazakhstan) Zarina Diyas
15	15	(Switzerland) Timea Bacsinszky	2,605	110	430	2,925	Quarterfinals lost to (Spain) Garbiñe Muguruza [20]
16	16	(United States) Venus Williams	2,586	130	240	2,696	Fourth round lost to (United States) Serena Williams [1]
17	17	(Ukraine) Elina Svitolina	2,405	10	70	2,465	Second round lost to (Australia) Casey Dellacqua
18	18	(Germany) Sabine Lisicki	2,320	430	130	2,020	Third round lost to (Switzerland) Timea Bacsinszky [15]
19	19	(Italy) Sara Errani	2,140	10+110	70+55	2,145	Second round lost to (Serbia) Aleksandra Krunić
20	20	(Spain) Garbiñe Muguruza	2,075	10	1,300	3,365	Runner-up, lost to (United States) Serena Williams [1]
21	21	(United States) Madison Keys	1,980	130	430	2,280	Quarterfinals lost to (Poland) Agnieszka Radwańska [13]
22	23	(Australia) Samantha Stosur	1,900	10	130	2,020	Third round lost to (United States) CoCo Vandeweghe
23	24	(Belarus) Victoria Azarenka	1,892	70	430	2,252	Quarterfinals lost to (United States) Serena Williams [1]
24	26	(Italy) Flavia Pennetta	1,847	70	10	1,787	First round lost to (Kazakhstan) Zarina Diyas
25	27	(France) Alizé Cornet	1,845	240	70	1,675	Second round lost to (Belarus) Olga Govortsova [Q]
26	25	(Russia) Svetlana Kuznetsova	1,866	10	70	1,926	Second round lost to (Czech Republic) Kristýna Plíšková
27	29	(Czech Republic) Barbora Strýcová	1,750	430	10	1,330	First round lost to (United States) Sloane Stephens
–	~~28~~	(China) ~~Peng Shuai~~	1,842	240	0	1,602	Withdrew due to back injury
28	30	(Serbia) Jelena Janković	1,685	10	240	1,915	Fourth round lost to (Poland) Agnieszka Radwańska [13]
29	31	(Romania) Irina-Camelia Begu	1,636	70+140	130+1	1,557	Third round lost to (Russia) Maria Sharapova [4]
30	22	(Switzerland) Belinda Bencic	1,980	130	240	2,090	Fourth round lost to (Belarus) Victoria Azarenka [23]
31	32	(Italy) Camila Giorgi	1,480	70+60	130+30	1,510	Third round lost to (Denmark) Caroline Wozniacki [5]
32	33	(France) Caroline Garcia	1,475	130	10	1,355	First round lost to (United Kingdom) Heather Watson

== Doubles seeds ==
=== Gentlemen's doubles ===
Team		Rank^{1}	Seed
(United States) Bob Bryan	(United States) Mike Bryan	2	1
(Croatia) Ivan Dodig	(Brazil) Marcelo Melo	7	2
(Canada) Vasek Pospisil	(United States) Jack Sock	11	3
(Netherlands) Jean-Julien Rojer	(Romania) Horia Tecău	15	4
(Italy) Simone Bolelli	(Italy) Fabio Fognini	20	5
(Spain) Marcel Granollers	(Spain) Marc López	25	6
(Poland) Marcin Matkowski	(Serbia) Nenad Zimonjić	27	7
(Austria) Alexander Peya	(Brazil) Bruno Soares	30	8
(India) Rohan Bopanna	(Romania) Florin Mergea	33	9
(France) Pierre-Hugues Herbert	(France) Nicolas Mahut	39	10
(Canada) Daniel Nestor	(India) Leander Paes	46	11
(Uruguay) Pablo Cuevas	(Spain) David Marrero	54	12
(United Kingdom) Jamie Murray	(Australia) John Peers	54	13
(South Africa) Raven Klaasen	(United States) Rajeev Ram	58	14
(Croatia) Marin Draganja	(Finland) Henri Kontinen	61	15
(Colombia) Juan Sebastián Cabal	(Colombia) Robert Farah	64	16

- ^{1} Rankings are as of 22 June 2015.

=== Ladies' doubles ===
Team		Rank^{1}	Seed
(Switzerland) Martina Hingis	(India) Sania Mirza	3	1
(Russia) Ekaterina Makarova	(Russia) Elena Vesnina	6	2
(United States) Bethanie Mattek-Sands	(Czech Republic) Lucie Šafářová	11	3
(Hungary) Tímea Babos	(France) Kristina Mladenovic	15	4
(United States) Raquel Kops-Jones	(United States) Abigail Spears	28	5
(Spain) Garbiñe Muguruza	(Spain) Carla Suárez Navarro	32	6
(Chinese Taipei) Hsieh Su-wei	(Italy) Flavia Pennetta	33	7
(Czech Republic) Andrea Hlaváčková	(Czech Republic) Lucie Hradecká	36	8
(Australia) Casey Dellacqua	(Kazakhstan) Yaroslava Shvedova	39	9
(France) Caroline Garcia	(Slovenia) Katarina Srebotnik	46	10
(Russia) Alla Kudryavtseva	(Russia) Anastasia Pavlyuchenkova	49	11
~~(United States) Serena Williams~~	~~(United States) Venus Williams~~	~~266~~	~~12^{2}~~
(Chinese Taipei) Chan Yung-jan	(China) Zheng Jie	55	13
(Netherlands) Michaëlla Krajicek	(Czech Republic) Barbora Strýcová	59	14
(Australia) Anastasia Rodionova	(Australia) Arina Rodionova	65	15
(Spain) Anabel Medina Garrigues	(Spain) Arantxa Parra Santonja	71	16

- ^{1} Rankings are as of 22 June 2015.
- ^{2} The Williams sisters were given a special seeding of 12, but they withdrew.

=== Mixed doubles ===
Team		Rank^{1}	Seed
(United States) Mike Bryan	(United States) Bethanie Mattek-Sands	7	1
(Brazil) Bruno Soares	(India) Sania Mirza	15	2
(Poland) Marcin Matkowski	(Russia) Elena Vesnina	20	3
(United States) Bob Bryan	(France) Caroline Garcia	22	4
(Austria) Alexander Peya	(Hungary) Tímea Babos	24	5
(Romania) Horia Tecău	(Slovenia) Katarina Srebotnik	25	6
(India) Leander Paes	(Switzerland) Martina Hingis	26	7
(Canada) Daniel Nestor	(France) Kristina Mladenovic	30	8
(Colombia) Juan Sebastián Cabal	(Zimbabwe) Cara Black	39	9
(South Africa) Raven Klaasen	(United States) Raquel Kops-Jones	39	10
(Netherlands) Jean-Julien Rojer	(Germany) Anna-Lena Grönefeld	42	11
~~(Uruguay) Pablo Cuevas~~	~~(Italy) Flavia Pennetta~~	~~44~~	~~12~~
(Romania) Florin Mergea	(Netherlands) Michaëlla Krajicek	46	13
(Australia) John Peers	(Chinese Taipei) Chan Yung-jan	53	14
(Finland) Henri Kontinen	(China) Zheng Jie	54	15
(Poland) Łukasz Kubot	(Czech Republic) Andrea Hlaváčková	58	16
(Spain) David Marrero	(Spain) Arantxa Parra Santonja	58	17

- ^{1} Rankings are as of 29 June 2015.

== Main draw wild card entries ==
The following players received wild cards into the main draw senior events.

=== Gentlemen's singles ===
- (United Kingdom) Liam Broady
- (Australia) Matthew Ebden
- (United Kingdom) Kyle Edmund
- (Australia) Lleyton Hewitt
- (United Kingdom) Brydan Klein
- (United States) Denis Kudla
- (France) Nicolas Mahut
- (United Kingdom) James Ward

=== Ladies' singles ===
- (United Kingdom) Naomi Broady
- (United Kingdom) Johanna Konta
- (Estonia) Anett Kontaveit
- (Latvia) Jeļena Ostapenko
- (United Kingdom) Laura Robson

=== Gentlemen's doubles ===
- (United Kingdom) Luke Bambridge / (United Kingdom) Liam Broady
- (United Kingdom) Edward Corrie / (United Kingdom) Kyle Edmund
- (Australia) Matthew Ebden / (United Kingdom) James Ward
- (Australia) Lleyton Hewitt / (Australia) Thanasi Kokkinakis
- (United Kingdom) Jonathan Marray / (Denmark) Frederik Nielsen
- (United Kingdom) Ken Skupski / (United Kingdom) Neal Skupski

=== Ladies' doubles ===
- (United Kingdom) Naomi Broady / (United Kingdom) Emily Webley-Smith
- (United Kingdom) Johanna Konta / (United States) Maria Sanchez
- (United Kingdom) Jocelyn Rae / (United Kingdom) Anna Smith

=== Mixed doubles ===
- (United Kingdom) Colin Fleming / (United Kingdom) Jocelyn Rae
- (Australia) Lleyton Hewitt / (Australia) Casey Dellacqua
- (United Kingdom) Jonathan Marray / (United Kingdom) Anna Smith
- (United Kingdom) Ken Skupski / (United Kingdom) Johanna Konta
- (United Kingdom) Neal Skupski / (United States) Lisa Raymond

== Main draw qualifier entries ==
The qualifying competitions took place in Bank of England Sports Centre, Roehampton on 22–25 June 2015.

=== Gentlemen's singles ===
1. (France) Vincent Millot
2. (Colombia) Alejandro Falla
3. (Sweden) Elias Ymer
4. (Japan) Hiroki Moriya
5. (Australia) Luke Saville
6. (Netherlands) Igor Sijsling
7. (France) Pierre-Hugues Herbert
8. (Japan) Yūichi Sugita
9. (Georgia (country)) Nikoloz Basilashvili
10. (Australia) John-Patrick Smith
11. (Germany) Michael Berrer
12. (Germany) Dustin Brown
13. (Kazakhstan) Aleksandr Nedovyesov
14. (Argentina) Horacio Zeballos
15. (Australia) John Millman
16. (France) Kenny de Schepper

==== Lucky losers ====
1. (Italy) Luca Vanni

=== Ladies' singles ===
1. (Germany) Laura Siegemund
2. (Belarus) Aliaksandra Sasnovich
3. (China) Xu Yifan
4. (United States) Sachia Vickery
5. (Russia) Margarita Gasparyan
6. (Netherlands) Richèl Hogenkamp
7. (Belarus) Olga Govortsova
8. (China) Duan Yingying
9. (Austria) Tamira Paszek
10. (Czech Republic) Petra Cetkovská
11. (United States) Bethanie Mattek-Sands
12. (Chinese Taipei) Hsieh Su-wei

=== Gentlemen's doubles ===
1. (Belarus) Sergey Betov / (Belarus) Aliaksandr Bury
2. (Israel) Jonathan Erlich / (Germany) Philipp Petzschner
3. (Poland) Mateusz Kowalczyk / (Slovakia) Igor Zelenay
4. (France) Fabrice Martin / (India) Purav Raja

==== Lucky losers ====
1. (New Zealand) Marcus Daniell / (Brazil) Marcelo Demoliner
2. (Germany) Gero Kretschmer / (Germany) Alexander Satschko

=== Ladies' doubles ===
1. (Russia) Elizaveta Kulichkova / (Russia) Evgeniya Rodina
2. (Sweden) Johanna Larsson / (Croatia) Petra Martić
3. (China) Wang Yafan / (China) Zhang Kailin
4. (Poland) Magda Linette / (Luxembourg) Mandy Minella

==== Lucky losers ====
1. (Chinese Taipei) Chan Chin-wei / (United States) Nicole Melichar
2. (Japan) Misaki Doi / (Liechtenstein) Stephanie Vogt
3. (Slovakia) Jana Čepelová / (Switzerland) Stefanie Vögele

== Protected ranking ==
The following players were accepted directly into the main draw using a protected ranking:

Men's singles

- (Germany) Tommy Haas (25)
- (Spain) Nicolás Almagro (26)
- (Germany) Florian Mayer (34)
- (Serbia) Janko Tipsarević (39)
- (Czech Republic) Radek Štěpánek (57)

Women's singles

- (United States) Edina Gallovits-Hall (109)

== Champions ==
=== Seniors ===
==== Gentlemen's singles ====
- (Serbia) Novak Djokovic def. (Switzerland) Roger Federer, 7–6^{(7–1)}, 6–7^{(10–12)}, 6–4, 6–3

Prior to the finals, the two had faced off 39 times, with Federer having won the most matches, 20–19. At the time of the finals Djokovic was ranked No. 1 and Federer at No. 2. This encounter was their third meeting in a Grand Slam final, when the last two previous were split between the two at the 2007 US Open and 2014 Wimbledon Championships. Federer got the first break of serve in the match, during the first set, yet Djokovic quickly broke back leveling the match. When Djokovic was serving to remain in the first set, he had to fend off two set points from Federer, which he eventually got the set into a tiebreak, and it was a lopsided tiebreak that sent Djokovic up one set to none. The second set was a closely fought affair, but was decided to Federer's edge in the tiebreak. The last two sets were rather uneventful in the spectrum of the match because Djokovic got the breaks of serve, allowing him to win his third Wimbledon title, and second in a row. This put Djokovic eighth on the all-time list of Men's Grand Slam singles champions, and putting him fifth during the Open Era. He now possesses as many Wimbledon singles titles, as his coach Boris Becker won in his career.

==== Ladies' singles ====
- (United States) Serena Williams def. (Spain) Garbiñe Muguruza, 6–4, 6–4

This was their first encounter in a Grand Slam final, whilst all of the past meetings, occurred in Grand Slam events, from the first-time playing each other at the 2013 Australian Open, that Serena Williams won the match in two sets, during this second round match. Their next contest occurred, at the 2014 French Open in the second round, yet this time around Garbiñe Muguruza, turned the tables to with the match in two sets. The third tie came, at the 2015 Australian Open, and it went three sets in a fourth round encounter, to the eventual victory by Serena in three sets. This bout would be their fourth meeting, and it got off to a rocky start by Serena, who served up three double faults, in order to get broken, during the first game of the match. Muguruza would get out to a four games to two advantage, when Williams held serve, and let out a "Come On". This rallied the twenty-time Grand Slam champion to win the first set, 6–4, when she broke the serve of Muguruza. Serena would get off to a fast start, during the second set, that she ended up getting breaks of serve from Muguruza in the fourth and sixth games of the set, to go up to a five games to one advantage. The momentous meaning the match held, for Williams ended up hitting her, when she had two bad service games, getting broken, letting Muguruza to come back to a five games to four set. This allowed Muguruza, the opportunity to serve in an attempt to stay in the match and set, yet she quickly got down in a love–40 hole, which she could not escape. The victory gave Serena her second "Serena Slam", and that was with the 2014 US Open win counted from the previous year. This victory was her twenty-first Grand Slam singles title, putting her one behind Steffi Graf in the Open Era of tennis, and three behind the all-time record held by Margaret Court. The win meant she became the oldest women's singles Grand Slam champion in the Open Era of tennis, besting the mark previously set by Martina Navratilova.

==== Gentlemen's doubles ====
- (Netherlands) Jean-Julien Rojer / (Romania) Horia Tecău def. (United Kingdom) Jamie Murray / (Australia) John Peers, 7–5, 6–4, 6–4

==== Ladies' doubles ====
- (Switzerland) Martina Hingis / (India) Sania Mirza def. (Russia) Ekaterina Makarova / (Russia) Elena Vesnina, 5–7, 7–6^{(7–4)}, 7–5

==== Mixed doubles ====
- (India) Leander Paes / (Switzerland) Martina Hingis def. (Austria) Alexander Peya / (Hungary) Tímea Babos, 6–1, 6–1

=== Juniors ===
==== Boys' singles ====
- (United States) Reilly Opelka def. (Sweden) Mikael Ymer, 7–6^{(7–5)}, 6–4

==== Girls' singles ====
- (Russia) Sofya Zhuk def. (Russia) Anna Blinkova, 7–5, 6–4

==== Boys' doubles ====
- (Vietnam) Lý Hoàng Nam / (India) Sumit Nagal def. (United States) Reilly Opelka / (Japan) Akira Santillan, 7–6^{(7–4)}, 6–4

==== Girls' doubles ====
- (Hungary) Dalma Gálfi / (Hungary) Fanny Stollár def. (Belarus) Vera Lapko / (Slovakia) Tereza Mihalíková, 6–3, 6–2

=== Invitation ===
==== Gentlemen's invitation doubles ====
- (Croatia) Ivan Ljubičić / (Croatia) Goran Ivanišević def. (South Africa) Wayne Ferreira / (France) Sébastien Grosjean, 6−3, 1−6, [10−5]

==== Ladies' invitation doubles ====
- (Bulgaria) Magdalena Maleeva / (Australia) Rennae Stubbs def. (United States) Martina Navratilova / (Tunisia) Selima Sfar, 3–6, 7–5, [10–8]

==== Senior gentlemen's invitation doubles ====
- (Netherlands) Jacco Eltingh / (Netherlands) Paul Haarhuis def. (France) Guy Forget / (France) Cédric Pioline, 6–4, 6–4

=== Wheelchair ===
==== Wheelchair gentlemen's doubles ====
- (Argentina) Gustavo Fernández / (France) Nicolas Peifer def. (France) Michaël Jérémiasz / (United Kingdom) Gordon Reid, 7–5, 5–7, 6–2

==== Wheelchair ladies' doubles ====
- (Japan) Yui Kamiji / (United Kingdom) Jordanne Whiley def. (Netherlands) Jiske Griffioen / (Netherlands) Aniek van Koot, 6−2, 5−7, 6−3

== Withdrawals ==
The following players were accepted directly into the main tournament, but withdrew with injuries.

Before the tournament

Men's singles

- ‡ (France) Julien Benneteau (44) → replaced by (Serbia) Filip Krajinović (99)
- ‡ (Argentina) Juan Martín del Potro (7 PR) → replaced by (Australia) Marinko Matosevic (100)
- § (Spain) David Ferrer (8) → replaced by (Italy) Luca Vanni (LL)

Women's singles

- † (Ukraine) Kateryna Kozlova (101) → replaced by (Slovakia) Jana Čepelová (109)
- ‡ (China) Peng Shuai (24) → replaced by (United States) Edina Gallovits-Hall (109 PR)

† – not included on entry list
‡ – withdrew from entry list
§ – withdrew from main draw

During the tournament
Men's singles

- (Japan) Kei Nishikori

== Retirements ==
Men's singles

- (Austria) Andreas Haider-Maurer
- (Uzbekistan) Denis Istomin

Women's singles

- (Italy) Karin Knapp
- (Poland) Magda Linette

Preceded by 2015 French Open	Grand Slam Tournaments	Succeeded by 2015 US Open
Preceded by 2014 Wimbledon Championships	The Championships, Wimbledon	Succeeded by 2016 Wimbledon Championships
