= 2015 Wimbledon Championships – Men's singles =

Men's singles
- 2015 Wimbledon Championships

Final
- Champion: (Serbia) Novak Djokovic
- Runner-up: (Switzerland) Roger Federer
- Score: 7–6^{(7–1)}, 6–7^{(10–12)}, 6–4, 6–3

Details
- Draw: 128 (16Q / 8WC)
- Seeds: 32

Events
Singles	men	women		boys	girls
Doubles	men	women	mixed	boys	girls
WC Singles	men	women	quad
WC Doubles	men	women	quad
Legends	men	women	seniors
- Wimbledon Championships

Defending champion Novak Djokovic defeated Roger Federer in a rematch of the previous year's final, 7–6^{(7–1)}, 6–7^{(10–12)}, 6–4, 6–3 to win the gentlemen's singles tennis title at the 2015 Wimbledon Championships. It was his third Wimbledon title and ninth major title overall. Federer was the first man in the Open Era to reach ten finals at the same major. Djokovic's win against Federer also marked his 200th match win at the majors.

In the second round, 102nd-ranked Dustin Brown upset two-time champion Rafael Nadal. Brown previously defeated Nadal on a grass court just a year prior at the Gerry Weber Open, the only other time the two had played each other. This marked the fourth straight year in which Nadal suffered an early exit from the tournament by losing to a player ranked outside the world's top 100.

2002 champion Lleyton Hewitt made his final Wimbledon singles appearance, losing to Jarkko Nieminen in the first round. This was the first major since the 2002 US Open where then-world No. 8 David Ferrer did not participate (due to an elbow injury), ending his streak of 50 consecutive major appearances. This was also the first major main draw appearance for future world No. 1, French Open and US Open champion, two-time ATP Finals champion and Olympic gold medalist Alexander Zverev; he lost to Denis Kudla in the second round.

== Seeds ==
1. (Serbia) Novak Djokovic (champion)
2. (Switzerland) Roger Federer (final)
3. (United Kingdom) Andy Murray (semifinals)
4. (Switzerland) Stan Wawrinka (quarterfinals)
5. (Japan) Kei Nishikori (second round, withdrew due to a calf injury)
6. (Czech Republic) Tomáš Berdych (fourth round)
7. (Canada) Milos Raonic (third round)
8. (Spain) David Ferrer (withdrew with an elbow injury; replaced by Luca Vanni)
9. (Croatia) Marin Čilić (quarterfinals)
10. (Spain) Rafael Nadal (second round)
11. (Bulgaria) Grigor Dimitrov (third round)
12. (France) Gilles Simon (quarterfinals)
13. (France) Jo-Wilfried Tsonga (third round)
14. (South Africa) Kevin Anderson (fourth round)
15. (Spain) Feliciano López (second round)
16. (Belgium) David Goffin (fourth round)

17. (United States) John Isner (third round)
18. (France) Gaël Monfils (third round)
19. (Spain) Tommy Robredo (first round)
20. (Spain) Roberto Bautista Agut (fourth round)
21. (France) Richard Gasquet (semifinals)
22. (Serbia) Viktor Troicki (fourth round)
23. (Croatia) Ivo Karlović (fourth round)
24. (Argentina) Leonardo Mayer (third round)
25. (Italy) Andreas Seppi (third round)
26. (Australia) Nick Kyrgios (fourth round)
27. (Australia) Bernard Tomic (third round)
28. (Uruguay) Pablo Cuevas (first round)
29. (Spain) Guillermo Garcia-Lopez (first round)
30. (Italy) Fabio Fognini (second round)
31. (United States) Jack Sock (first round)
32. (Austria) Dominic Thiem (second round)

Click on the seed number of a player to go to their draw section.

== Draw ==
Key

- Q = Qualifier
- WC = Wild card
- LL = Lucky loser
- Alt = Alternate
- ITF = ITF entry
- PR = Protected ranking
- SR = Special ranking
- SE = Special exempt
- JE = Junior exempt
- JR = Junior Accelerator Programme entrant
- CO = College Accelerator Programme entrant
- NG = Next Gen Accelerator Program entrant
- w/o = Walkover
- r = Retired
- d = Defaulted

=== Finals ===
Quarterfinals
1	(Serbia) Novak Djokovic	6	6	6
9	(Croatia) Marin Čilić	4	4	4
4	(Switzerland) Stan Wawrinka	4	6	6	4	9
21	(France) Richard Gasquet	6	4	3	6	11
(Canada) Vasek Pospisil	4	5	4
3	(United Kingdom) Andy Murray	6	7	6
12	(France) Gilles Simon	3	5	2
2	(Switzerland) Roger Federer	6	7	6

Semifinals
1	(Serbia) Novak Djokovic	7^{7}	6	6
21	(France) Richard Gasquet	6^{2}	4	4
3	(United Kingdom) Andy Murray	5	5	4
2	(Switzerland) Roger Federer	7	7	6

Final
1	(Serbia) Novak Djokovic	7^{7}	6^{10}	6	6
2	(Switzerland) Roger Federer	6^{1}	7^{12}	4	3

=== Top half ===
==== Section 1 ====
First round
1	(Serbia) N Djokovic	6	6	6
(Germany) P Kohlschreiber	4	4	4
(Finland) J Nieminen	3	6	4	6	11
WC	(Australia) L Hewitt	6	3	6	0	9
Q	(France) P-H Herbert	1	6	3	6	10
(South Korea) H Chung	6	2	6	2	8
(Germany) J-L Struff	3	6	6	2	3
27	(Australia) B Tomic	6	3	2	6	6
24	(Argentina) L Mayer	7^{9}	7^{7}	6
(Australia) T Kokkinakis	6^{7}	6^{3}	4
PR	(Serbia) J Tipsarević	3	4	2
(Spain) M Granollers	6	6	6
(Turkey) M İlhan	7^{7}	6	6^{4}	6
(Poland) J Janowicz	6^{4}	4	7^{7}	3
(France) L Pouille	2	5	6	3
14	(South Africa) K Anderson	6	7	3	6

Second round
1	(Serbia) N Djokovic	6	6	6
(Finland) J Nieminen	4	2	3
Q	(France) P-H Herbert	6^{3}	4	6^{5}
27	(Australia) B Tomic	7^{7}	6	7^{7}
24	(Argentina) L Mayer	6	7^{7}	6
(Spain) M Granollers	3	6^{4}	3
(Turkey) M İlhan	7^{7}	6^{6}	4	4
14	(South Africa) K Anderson	6^{5}	7^{8}	6	6

Third round
1	(Serbia) N Djokovic	6	6	6
27	(Australia) B Tomic	3	3	3
24	(Argentina) L Mayer	4	6^{6}	3
14	(South Africa) K Anderson	6	7^{8}	6

Fourth round
1	(Serbia) N Djokovic	6^{6}	6^{6}	6	6	7
14	(South Africa) K Anderson	7^{8}	7^{8}	1	4	5

==== Section 2 ====
First round
9	(Croatia) M Čilić	6	6	7^{7}
Q	(Japan) H Moriya	3	2	6^{4}
(Austria) A Haider-Maurer	2	2^{r}
(Lithuania) R Berankis	6	5
WC	(Australia) M Ebden	6	6	6
(Slovenia) B Rola	2	1	4
(Japan) G Soeda	6^{5}	4	4
17	(United States) J Isner	7^{7}	6	6
28	(Uruguay) P Cuevas	7^{7}	6	3	2	2
WC	(United States) D Kudla	6^{4}	4	6	6	6
(Russia) T Gabashvili	3	6	3	6	7
(Germany) A Zverev	6	1	6	3	9
(Brazil) J Souza	4	3	2
(Colombia) S Giraldo	6	6	6
(Italy) S Bolelli	3	7^{7}	2	6	3
5	(Japan) K Nishikori	6	6^{4}	6	3	6

Second round
9	(Croatia) M Čilić	6	4	7^{8}	4	7
(Lithuania) R Berankis	3	6	6^{6}	6	5
WC	(Australia) M Ebden	2	6^{8}	4
17	(United States) J Isner	6	7^{10}	6
WC	(United States) D Kudla	6	3	7^{7}	6
(Germany) A Zverev	3	6	6^{2}	4
(Colombia) S Giraldo	w/o
5	(Japan) K Nishikori

Third round
9	(Croatia) M Čilić	7^{7}	6^{6}	6	6^{4}	12
17	(United States) J Isner	6^{4}	7^{8}	4	7^{7}	10
WC	(United States) D Kudla	6	6^{3}	2	6	6
(Colombia) S Giraldo	2	7^{7}	6	1	3

Fourth round
9	(Croatia) M Čilić	6	4	6	7
WC	(United States) D Kudla	4	6	3	5

==== Section 3 ====
First round
4	(Switzerland) S Wawrinka	6	7	7^{7}
(Portugal) J Sousa	2	5	6^{3}
(Dominican Republic) V Estrella Burgos	5	6	6	6
(Germany) B Becker	7	1	4	4
(Slovakia) M Kližan	6	2	3	7^{7}	11
(Spain) F Verdasco	4	6	6	6^{5}	13
(Israel) D Sela	6	3	4	4
32	(Austria) D Thiem	2	6	6	6
19	(Spain) T Robredo	2	3	4
Q	(Australia) J Millman	6	6	6
(United States) D Young	7	2	4	4
(Cyprus) M Baghdatis	5	6	6	6
WC	(United Kingdom) L Broady	5	4	6	6	6
(Australia) M Matosevic	7	6	3	2	3
Q	(Argentina) H Zeballos	6^{4}	1	1
16	(Belgium) D Goffin	7^{7}	6	6

Second round
4	(Switzerland) S Wawrinka	6	6	7
(Dominican Republic) V Estrella Burgos	3	4	5
(Spain) F Verdasco	5	6	5	6	6
32	(Austria) D Thiem	7	4	7	3	4
Q	(Australia) J Millman	7^{7}	6	3	2	4
(Cyprus) M Baghdatis	6^{5}	2	6	6	6
WC	(United Kingdom) L Broady	6^{3}	1	1
16	(Belgium) D Goffin	7^{7}	6	6

Third round
4	(Switzerland) S Wawrinka	6	6	6
(Spain) F Verdasco	4	3	4
(Cyprus) M Baghdatis	3	4	2
16	(Belgium) D Goffin	6	6	6

Fourth round
4	(Switzerland) S Wawrinka	7^{7}	7^{9}	6
16	(Belgium) D Goffin	6^{3}	6^{7}	4

==== Section 4 ====
First round
11	(Bulgaria) G Dimitrov	6	6	6
(Argentina) F Delbonis	3	0	4
(Slovakia) L Lacko	3	7^{7}	6	1	4
(United States) S Johnson	6	6^{5}	4	6	6
Q	(France) K de Schepper	4	4	7^{7}	6	6
Q	(Australia) J-P Smith	6	6	6^{4}	4	4
Q	(Australia) L Saville	3	2	2
21	(France) R Gasquet	6	6	6
26	(Australia) N Kyrgios	6	6	7^{8}
(Argentina) D Schwartzman	0	2	6^{6}
(Argentina) J Mónaco	6	6	6
PR	(Germany) F Mayer	1	2	4
(Serbia) D Lajović	2	3	6	2
PR	(Germany) T Haas	6	6	4	6
(Spain) D Gimeno-Traver	2	3	6	6^{4}
7	(Canada) M Raonic	6	6	3	7^{7}

Second round
11	(Bulgaria) G Dimitrov	7^{10}	6	7^{7}
(United States) S Johnson	6^{8}	2	6^{2}
Q	(France) K de Schepper	0	3	3
21	(France) R Gasquet	6	6	6
26	(Australia) N Kyrgios	7^{7}	6	6
(Argentina) J Mónaco	6^{5}	3	4
PR	(Germany) T Haas	0	2	7^{7}	6^{4}
7	(Canada) M Raonic	6	6	6^{5}	7^{7}

Third round
11	(Bulgaria) G Dimitrov	3	4	4
21	(France) R Gasquet	6	6	6
26	(Australia) N Kyrgios	5	7	7^{7}	6
7	(Canada) M Raonic	7	5	6^{3}	3

Fourth round
21	(France) R Gasquet	7	6	6^{7}	7^{8}
26	(Australia) N Kyrgios	5	1	7^{9}	6^{6}

=== Bottom half ===
==== Section 5 ====
First round
LL	(Italy) L Vanni	7^{7}	2	4	3
WC	(United Kingdom) J Ward	6^{4}	6	6	6
(Czech Republic) J Veselý	7^{9}	7^{8}	6
(Italy) P Lorenzi	6^{7}	6^{6}	4
(Canada) V Pospisil	7^{7}	3	6^{4}	7^{7}	6
Q	(France) V Millot	6^{2}	6	7^{7}	6^{4}	3
(United States) T Smyczek	4	3	2
30	(Italy) F Fognini	6	6	6
22	(Serbia) V Troicki	6	6	3	6
Q	(Kazakhstan) A Nedovyesov	1	4	6	3
PR	(Czech Republic) R Štěpánek	5	6	6	3	4
(United Kingdom) A Bedene	7	1	4	6	6
Q	(Germany) D Brown	3	6	7	6
(Chinese Taipei) Y-h Lu	6	3	5	4
(Brazil) T Bellucci	4	2	4
10	(Spain) R Nadal	6	6	6

Second round
WC	(United Kingdom) J Ward	6	7^{7}	3	6
(Czech Republic) J Veselý	2	6^{4}	6	3
(Canada) V Pospisil	6	6	1	6
30	(Italy) F Fognini	3	4	6	3
22	(Serbia) V Troicki	6	3	6	6
(United Kingdom) A Bedene	4	6	2	4
Q	(Germany) D Brown	7	3	6	6
10	(Spain) R Nadal	5	6	4	4

Third round
WC	(United Kingdom) J Ward	4	6	6	3	6
(Canada) V Pospisil	6	3	2	6	8
22	(Serbia) V Troicki	6	7^{7}	4	6
Q	(Germany) D Brown	4	6^{3}	6	3

Fourth round
(Canada) V Pospisil	4	6^{4}	6	6	6
22	(Serbia) V Troicki	6	7^{7}	4	3	3

==== Section 6 ====
First round
13	(France) J-W Tsonga	7^{10}	6^{3}	6	3	6
(Luxembourg) G Müller	6^{8}	7^{7}	4	6	2
(Uzbekistan) D Istomin	2	2	2^{r}
(Spain) A Ramos Viñolas	6	6	3
(Ukraine) A Dolgopolov	7^{7}	6	6
WC	(United Kingdom) K Edmund	6^{4}	1	2
Q	(Sweden) E Ymer	7^{7}	2	4	6^{2}
23	(Croatia) I Karlović	6^{2}	6	6	7^{7}
25	(Italy) A Seppi	6	6	6
WC	(United Kingdom) B Klein	3	2	2
(Ukraine) S Stakhovsky	6	6^{5}	2	6	7
(Croatia) B Ćorić	4	7^{7}	6	1	9
(Netherlands) R Haase	6	3	6	6
Q	(Colombia) A Falla	2	6	4	2
(Kazakhstan) M Kukushkin	4	6^{3}	4
3	(United Kingdom) A Murray	6	7^{7}	6

Second round
13	(France) J-W Tsonga	6	6	6
(Spain) A Ramos	3	4	4
(Ukraine) A Dolgopolov	7	3	4	7^{7}	11
23	(Croatia) I Karlović	5	6	6	6^{4}	13
25	(Italy) A Seppi	4	6	6^{3}	6	6
(Croatia) B Ćorić	6	4	7^{7}	1	1
(Netherlands) R Haase	1	1	4
3	(United Kingdom) A Murray	6	6	6

Third round
13	(France) J-W Tsonga	6^{3}	6	6^{2}	6^{9}
23	(Croatia) I Karlović	7^{7}	4	7^{7}	7^{11}
25	(Italy) A Seppi	2	2	6	1
3	(United Kingdom) A Murray	6	6	1	6

Fourth round
23	(Croatia) I Karlović	6^{7}	4	7	4
3	(United Kingdom) A Murray	7^{9}	6	5	6

==== Section 7 ====
First round
6	(Czech Republic) T Berdych	6	6^{8}	7^{7}	7^{7}
(France) J Chardy	2	7^{10}	6^{3}	6^{5}
(Serbia) F Krajinović	6^{4}	4	6	5
WC	(France) N Mahut	7^{7}	6	3	7
(Latvia) E Gulbis	6^{2}	3	6^{3}
(Czech Republic) L Rosol	7^{7}	6	7^{7}
(Spain) P Andújar	3	6	3	7	6
29	(Spain) G García-López	6	4	6	5	4
18	(France) G Monfils	6	6	7
(Spain) P Carreño Busta	4	4	5
(France) A Mannarino	6^{4}	6	6	6
Q	(Germany) M Berrer	7^{7}	0	4	1
Q	(Japan) Y Sugita	6^{3}	3	6^{5}
(Slovenia) B Kavčič	7^{7}	6	7^{7}
PR	(Spain) N Almagro	4	4	5
12	(France) G Simon	6	6	7

Second round
6	(Czech Republic) T Berdych	6	6	6
WC	(France) N Mahut	1	4	4
(Czech Republic) L Rosol	4	6	6	6^{4}	4
(Spain) P Andújar	6	1	4	7^{7}	6
18	(France) G Monfils	7^{7}	6	7
(France) A Mannarino	6^{5}	3	5
(Slovenia) B Kavčič	1	1	7^{7}	1
12	(France) G Simon	6	6	6^{5}	6

Third round
6	(Czech Republic) T Berdych	4	6	6	7^{7}
(Spain) P Andújar	6	0	3	6^{3}
18	(France) G Monfils	6	3	6^{6}	6	2
12	(France) G Simon	3	6	7^{8}	2	6

Fourth round
6	(Czech Republic) T Berdych	3	3	2
12	(France) G Simon	6	6	6

==== Section 8 ====
First round
15	(Spain) F López	6	7^{7}	6
(Belgium) S Darcis	2	6^{4}	4
Q	(Georgia (country)) N Basilashvili	6	7^{7}	6
(Argentina) F Bagnis	4	6^{3}	2
(France) B Paire	6	6	6
(Russia) M Youzhny	4	4	3
(Belgium) R Bemelmans	1	3	6^{6}
20	(Spain) R Bautista Agut	6	6	7^{8}
31	(United States) J Sock	3	6	3	3
(Australia) S Groth	6	3	6	6
(Tunisia) M Jaziri	6^{2}	2	6	6	5
(Australia) J Duckworth	7^{7}	6	3	3	7
(United States) S Querrey	7	6	6
Q	(Netherlands) I Sijsling	5	3	4
(Bosnia and Herzegovina) D Džumhur	1	3	3
2	(Switzerland) R Federer	6	6	6

Second round
15	(Spain) F López	5	6	3	6	4
Q	(Georgia (country)) N Basilashvili	7	3	6	2	6
(France) B Paire	6	6	3	3	3
20	(Spain) R Bautista Agut	2	4	6	6	6
(Australia) S Groth	7	6	7^{8}
(Australia) J Duckworth	5	4	6^{6}
(United States) S Querrey	4	2	2
2	(Switzerland) R Federer	6	6	6

Third round
Q	(Georgia (country)) N Basilashvili	6^{4}	0	1
20	(Spain) R Bautista Agut	7^{7}	6	6
(Australia) S Groth	4	4	7^{7}	2
2	(Switzerland) R Federer	6	6	6^{5}	6

Fourth round
20	(Spain) R Bautista Agut	2	2	3
2	(Switzerland) R Federer	6	6	6

Preceded by 2015 French Open – Men's singles	Grand Slam men's singles	Succeeded by 2015 US Open – Men's singles
