= 2015 Wimbledon Championships – Men's doubles =

Men's doubles
- 2015 Wimbledon Championships

Final
- Champions: (Netherlands) Jean-Julien Rojer (Romania) Horia Tecău
- Runners-up: (United Kingdom) Jamie Murray (Australia) John Peers
- Score: 7–6^{(7–5)}, 6–4, 6–4

Events
Singles	men	women		boys	girls
Doubles	men	women	mixed	boys	girls
WC Singles	men	women	quad
WC Doubles	men	women	quad
Legends	men	women	seniors
← 2014 ·	Wimbledon Championships	· 2016 →

Vasek Pospisil and Jack Sock were the defending champions, but lost in the third round to Jamie Murray and John Peers. Jean-Julien Rojer and Horia Tecău won the title by defeating Murray and Peers in the final by a score of 7–6^{(7–5)}, 6–4, 6–4.

== Seeds ==
1. (United States) Bob Bryan / (United States) Mike Bryan (quarterfinals)
2. (Croatia) Ivan Dodig / (Brazil) Marcelo Melo (quarterfinals)
3. (Canada) Vasek Pospisil / (United States) Jack Sock (third round)
4. (Netherlands) Jean-Julien Rojer / (Romania) Horia Tecău (champions)
5. (Italy) Simone Bolelli / (Italy) Fabio Fognini (first round)
6. (Spain) Marcel Granollers / (Spain) Marc López (second round)
7. (Poland) Marcin Matkowski / (Serbia) Nenad Zimonjić (quarterfinals)
8. (Austria) Alexander Peya / (Brazil) Bruno Soares (quarterfinals)

9. (India) Rohan Bopanna / (Romania) Florin Mergea (semifinals)
10. (France) Pierre-Hugues Herbert / (France) Nicolas Mahut (third round)
11. (Canada) Daniel Nestor / (India) Leander Paes (third round)
12. (Uruguay) Pablo Cuevas / (Spain) David Marrero (first round)
13. (United Kingdom) Jamie Murray / (Australia) John Peers (final)
14. (South Africa) Raven Klaasen / (United States) Rajeev Ram (second round)
15. (Croatia) Marin Draganja / (Finland) Henri Kontinen (first round)
16. (Colombia) Juan Sebastián Cabal / (Colombia) Robert Farah (second round)

Click on the seed number of a player to go to their draw section.

== Draw ==
=== Key ===
- Q = Qualifier
- WC = Wild card
- LL = Lucky loser
- Alt = Alternate
- ITF = ITF entry
- PR = Protected ranking
- SR = Special ranking
- SE = Special exempt
- JE = Junior exempt
- JR = Junior Accelerator Programme entrant
- CO = College Accelerator Programme entrant
- NG = Next Gen Accelerator Program entrant
- w/o = Walkover
- r = Retired
- d = Defaulted

=== Finals ===
Quarterfinals
1	(United States) Bob Bryan (United States) Mike Bryan	7	4	6^{9}	6^{5}
9	(India) Rohan Bopanna (Romania) Florin Mergea	5	6	7^{11}	7^{7}
4	(Netherlands) Jean-Julien Rojer (Romania) Horia Tecău	6	6	7^{7}
7	(Poland) Marcin Matkowski (Serbia) Nenad Zimonjić	4	3	6^{2}
8	(Austria) Alexander Peya (Brazil) Bruno Soares	4	6^{3}	3
13	(United Kingdom) Jamie Murray (Australia) John Peers	6	7^{7}	6
Q	(Israel) Jonathan Erlich (Germany) Philipp Petzschner	4	6	6	6
2	(Croatia) Ivan Dodig (Brazil) Marcelo Melo	6	2	2	4

Semifinals
9	(India) Rohan Bopanna (Romania) Florin Mergea	6	2	3	6	11
4	(Netherlands) Jean-Julien Rojer (Romania) Horia Tecău	4	6	6	4	13
13	(United Kingdom) Jamie Murray (Australia) John Peers	4	6	6	6
Q	(Israel) Jonathan Erlich (Germany) Philipp Petzschner	6	3	4	2

Final
4	(Netherlands) Jean-Julien Rojer (Romania) Horia Tecău	7^{7}	6	6
13	(United Kingdom) Jamie Murray (Australia) John Peers	6^{5}	4	4

=== Top half ===
==== Section 1 ====
First round
1	(United States) B Bryan (United States) M Bryan	6	6	6
LL	(Germany) G Kretschmer (Germany) A Satschko	3	4	3
(United States) S Johnson (United States) S Querrey	6	6	6
(United Kingdom) A Bedene (Bosnia and Herzegovina) D Džumhur	1	3	3
(Colombia) S Giraldo (Portugal) J Sousa	6	3	4	2
(Croatia) M Pavić (New Zealand) M Venus	4	6	6	6
(Spain) P Andújar (Austria) O Marach	6^{2}	4	6	7^{7}	6
14	(South Africa) R Klaasen (United States) R Ram	7^{7}	6	2	6^{5}	8
9	(India) R Bopanna (Romania) F Mergea	6	7^{7}	6
(United States) T Smyczek (Czech Republic) J Veselý	3	6^{1}	1
PR	(Czech Republic) R Štěpánek (Russia) M Youzhny	7	4	2	7^{7}	3
(Brazil) T Bellucci (Argentina) G Durán	5	6	6	6^{5}	6
(France) A Mannarino (France) L Pouille	5	4	3
(Poland) Ł Kubot (Belarus) M Mirnyi	7	6	6
Q	(Poland) M Kowalczyk (Slovakia) I Zelenay	6	6	6^{6}	4	13
6	(Spain) M Granollers (Spain) M López	3	4	7^{8}	6	15

Second round
1	(United States) B Bryan (United States) M Bryan	6	5	7^{7}	6
(United States) S Johnson (United States) S Querrey	1	7	6^{3}	3
(Croatia) M Pavić (New Zealand) M Venus	7^{7}	6	3	6^{5}	11
14	(South Africa) R Klaasen (United States) R Ram	6^{4}	4	6	7^{7}	9
9	(India) R Bopanna (Romania) F Mergea	7	7^{7}	7^{7}
(Brazil) T Bellucci (Argentina) G Durán	5	6^{5}	6^{4}
(Poland) Ł Kubot (Belarus) M Mirnyi	6	6	6
6	(Spain) M Granollers (Spain) M López	4	3	4

Third round
1	(United States) B Bryan (United States) M Bryan	7^{7}	6	6
(Croatia) M Pavić (New Zealand) M Venus	6^{4}	3	1
9	(India) R Bopanna (Romania) F Mergea	7^{7}	6^{5}	7^{7}	7^{10}
(Poland) Ł Kubot (Belarus) M Mirnyi	6^{4}	7^{7}	6^{5}	6^{8}

Quarterfinals
1	(United States) B Bryan (United States) M Bryan	7	4	6^{9}	6^{5}
9	(India) R Bopanna (Romania) F Mergea	5	6	7^{11}	7^{7}

==== Section 2 ====
First round
4	(Netherlands) J-J Rojer (Romania) H Tecău	3
(Slovakia) M Kližan (Czech Republic) L Rosol	0^{r}
(Dominican Republic) V Estrella Burgos (Brazil) J Souza	4	6^{3}	6	5
(Germany) A Begemann (Austria) J Knowle	6	7^{7}	3	7
(Sweden) R Lindstedt (Austria) J Melzer	6	6	6
PR	(India) M Bhupathi (Serbia) J Tipsarević	3	3	2
WC	(Australia) L Hewitt (Australia) T Kokkinakis	6^{6}	3	7^{7}	6	8
15	(Croatia) M Draganja (Finland) H Kontinen	7^{8}	6	6^{1}	2	6
10	(France) P-H Herbert (France) N Mahut	1	7^{7}	6	4	6
PR	(Spain) N Almagro (Spain) A Menéndez Maceiras	6	6^{3}	3	6	3
(Luxembourg) G Müller (Pakistan) A-u-H Qureshi	6	6	6
(Germany) B Becker (Venezuela) R Maytín	3	3	3
(United Kingdom) D Inglot (France) É Roger-Vasselin	7^{7}	6	6^{4}	6
(Australia) R Junaid (Canada) A Shamasdin	6^{4}	3	7^{7}	2
WC	(United Kingdom) K Skupski (United Kingdom) N Skupski	6^{5}	6	6	6^{4}	4
7	(Poland) M Matkowski (Serbia) N Zimonjić	7^{7}	1	4	7^{7}	6

Second round
4	(Netherlands) J-J Rojer (Romania) H Tecău	1	3	6	6	15
(Germany) A Begemann (Austria) J Knowle	6	6	4	2	13
(Sweden) R Lindstedt (Austria) J Melzer	3	6	6	6^{6}	4
WC	(Australia) L Hewitt (Australia) T Kokkinakis	6	3	4	7^{8}	6
10	(France) P-H Herbert (France) N Mahut	6^{9}	7^{7}	6	6
(Luxembourg) G Müller (Pakistan) A-u-H Qureshi	7^{11}	6^{4}	4	4
(United Kingdom) D Inglot (France) É Roger-Vasselin	7^{7}	6	6^{3}	4	3
7	(Poland) M Matkowski (Serbia) N Zimonjić	6^{4}	2	7^{7}	6	6

Third round
4	(Netherlands) J-J Rojer (Romania) H Tecău	7^{9}	6	7^{7}
WC	(Australia) L Hewitt (Australia) T Kokkinakis	6^{7}	3	6^{1}
10	(France) P-H Herbert (France) N Mahut	6^{7}	6	5	1
7	(Poland) M Matkowski (Serbia) N Zimonjić	7^{9}	3	7	6

Quarterfinals
4	(Netherlands) J-J Rojer (Romania) H Tecău	6	6	7^{7}
7	(Poland) M Matkowski (Serbia) N Zimonjić	4	3	6^{2}

=== Bottom half ===
==== Section 3 ====
First round
8	(Austria) A Peya (Brazil) B Soares	6	6	6^{5}	6
(Spain) P Carreño Busta (Spain) D Gimeno Traver	3	4	7^{7}	1
Q	(Belarus) S Betov (Belarus) A Bury	7	6	6
WC	(United Kingdom) E Corrie (United Kingdom) K Edmund	5	4	3
WC	(Australia) M Ebden (United Kingdom) J Ward	5	2	6^{3}
(Russia) T Gabashvili (Chinese Taipei) Y-h Lu	7	6	7^{7}
(Serbia) D Lajović (Serbia) V Troicki	3	4	5
11	(Canada) D Nestor (India) L Paes	6	6	7
13	(United Kingdom) J Murray (Australia) J Peers	6	7^{7}	6
WC	(United Kingdom) L Bambridge (United Kingdom) L Broady	1	6^{2}	2
(United States) N Monroe (New Zealand) A Sitak	7^{7}	4	6	3	10
(Germany) D Brown (Austria) A Haider-Maurer	6^{3}	6	4	6	8
(United States) E Butorac (United Kingdom) C Fleming	6^{5}	7	7	3
(Czech Republic) F Čermák (Austria) P Oswald	7^{7}	5	5	2^{r}
(Australia) S Groth (Ukraine) S Stakhovsky	7	6^{5}	6^{3}	1
3	(Canada) V Pospisil (United States) J Sock	5	7^{7}	7^{7}	6

Second round
8	(Austria) A Peya (Brazil) B Soares	6	7^{8}	4	6
Q	(Belarus) S Betov (Belarus) A Bury	1	6^{6}	6	1
(Russia) T Gabashvili (Chinese Taipei) Y-h Lu	7	6^{3}	6^{4}	5
11	(Canada) D Nestor (India) L Paes	5	7^{7}	7^{7}	7
13	(United Kingdom) J Murray (Australia) J Peers	7	4	4	7^{7}	6
(United States) N Monroe (New Zealand) A Sitak	5	6	6	6^{5}	4
(United States) E Butorac (United Kingdom) C Fleming	3	3	6^{4}
3	(Canada) V Pospisil (United States) J Sock	6	6	7^{7}

Third round
8	(Austria) A Peya (Brazil) B Soares	6	7	3	2	6
11	(Canada) D Nestor (India) L Paes	3	5	6	6	2
13	(United Kingdom) J Murray (Australia) J Peers	6	7^{8}	6^{5}	3	8
3	(Canada) V Pospisil (United States) J Sock	3	6^{6}	7^{7}	6	6

Quarterfinals
8	(Austria) A Peya (Brazil) B Soares	4	6^{3}	3
13	(United Kingdom) J Murray (Australia) J Peers	6	7^{7}	6

==== Section 4 ====
First round
5	(Italy) S Bolelli (Italy) F Fognini	5	6^{2}	3
(Spain) G García López (Tunisia) M Jaziri	7	7^{7}	6
LL	(New Zealand) M Daniell (Brazil) M Demoliner	6	7^{7}	6
(Netherlands) R Haase (France) B Paire	3	6^{4}	1
(Spain) A Ramos Viñolas (Italy) A Seppi	4	2	6	3
Q	(Israel) J Erlich (Germany) P Petzschner	6	6	4	6
(Philippines) T Huey (United States) S Lipsky	7^{7}	6	6
12	(Uruguay) P Cuevas (Spain) D Marrero	6^{2}	2	4
16	(Colombia) JS Cabal (Colombia) R Farah	6	3	4	7^{7}	6
(Australia) C Guccione (Brazil) A Sá	4	6	6	6^{2}	4
WC	(United Kingdom) J Marray (Denmark) F Nielsen	6	6	4	7^{9}
Q	(France) F Martin (India) P Raja	1	4	6	6^{7}
(Moldova) R Albot (Kazakhstan) M Kukushkin	4	3	4
(Poland) M Fyrstenberg (Mexico) S González	6	6	6
(Argentina) L Mayer (Argentina) D Schwartzman	4	0^{r}
2	(Croatia) I Dodig (Brazil) M Melo	6	4

Second round
(Spain) G García López (Tunisia) M Jaziri
LL	(New Zealand) M Daniell (Brazil) M Demoliner	w/o
Q	(Israel) J Erlich (Germany) P Petzschner	6	7	7^{7}
(Philippines) T Huey (United States) S Lipsky	3	5	6^{3}
16	(Colombia) JS Cabal (Colombia) R Farah	3	7	5	4
WC	(United Kingdom) J Marray (Denmark) F Nielsen	6	5	7	6
(Poland) M Fyrstenberg (Mexico) S González	6^{2}	7^{7}	6	6^{5}	4
2	(Croatia) I Dodig (Brazil) M Melo	7^{7}	6^{4}	2	7^{7}	6

Third round
LL	(New Zealand) M Daniell (Brazil) M Demoliner	3	6	3	3
Q	(Israel) J Erlich (Germany) P Petzschner	6	4	6	6
WC	(United Kingdom) J Marray (Denmark) F Nielsen	1	4	6^{6}
2	(Croatia) I Dodig (Brazil) M Melo	6	6	7^{8}

Quarterfinals
Q	(Israel) J Erlich (Germany) P Petzschner	4	6	6	6
2	(Croatia) I Dodig (Brazil) M Melo	6	2	2	4
