= 2015 Wimbledon Championships – Women's singles =

Women's singles
- 2015 Wimbledon Championships

Final
- Champion: (United States) Serena Williams
- Runner-up: (Spain) Garbiñe Muguruza
- Score: 6–4, 6–4

Details
- Draw: 128 (12 Q / 5 WC )
- Seeds: 32

Events
Singles	men	women		boys	girls
Doubles	men	women	mixed	boys	girls
WC Singles	men	women	quad
WC Doubles	men	women	quad
Legends	men	women	seniors
← 2014 ·	Wimbledon Championships	· 2016 →

Serena Williams defeated Garbiñe Muguruza in the final, 6–4, 6–4 to win the ladies' singles tennis title at the 2015 Wimbledon Championships. It was her sixth Wimbledon singles title and 21st major singles title overall. With the win, Williams completed her second "Serena Slam", a non-calendar year Grand Slam. This also marked the first Channel Slam (winning the French Open and Wimbledon in the same year) in women's singles since Williams herself in 2002. Williams defeated four former and future world No. 1 players consecutively to win the title: her sister Venus Williams, Victoria Azarenka, Maria Sharapova, and Muguruza.

Petra Kvitová was the defending champion, but lost to Jelena Janković in the third round.

Muguruza was the first Spaniard to reach the final since Arantxa Sánchez Vicario in 1996. She would win the title two years later.

This marked the first major main draw appearance of future French Open champion Jeļena Ostapenko; she lost to Kristina Mladenovic in the second round.

== Seeds ==
1. (United States) Serena Williams (champion)
2. (Czech Republic) Petra Kvitová (third round)
3. (Romania) Simona Halep (first round)
4. (Russia) Maria Sharapova (semifinals)
5. (Denmark) Caroline Wozniacki (fourth round)
6. (Czech Republic) Lucie Šafářová (fourth round)
7. (Serbia) Ana Ivanovic (second round)
8. (Russia) Ekaterina Makarova (second round)
9. (Spain) Carla Suárez Navarro (first round)
10. (Germany) Angelique Kerber (third round)
11. (Czech Republic) Karolína Plíšková (second round)
12. (Canada) Eugenie Bouchard (first round)
13. (Poland) Agnieszka Radwańska (semifinals)
14. (Germany) Andrea Petkovic (third round)
15. (Switzerland) Timea Bacsinszky (quarterfinals)
16. (United States) Venus Williams (fourth round)

17. (Ukraine) Elina Svitolina (second round)
18. (Germany) Sabine Lisicki (third round)
19. (Italy) Sara Errani (second round)
20. (Spain) Garbiñe Muguruza (final)
21. (United States) Madison Keys (quarterfinals)
22. (Australia) Samantha Stosur (third round)
23. (Belarus) Victoria Azarenka (quarterfinals)
24. (Italy) Flavia Pennetta (first round)
25. (France) Alizé Cornet (second round)
26. (Russia) Svetlana Kuznetsova (second round)
27. (Czech Republic) Barbora Strýcová (first round)
28. (Serbia) Jelena Janković (fourth round)
29. (Romania) Irina-Camelia Begu (third round)
30. (Switzerland) Belinda Bencic (fourth round)
31. (Italy) Camila Giorgi (third round)
32. (France) Caroline Garcia (first round)

Click on the seed number of a player to go to their draw section.

== Draw ==
=== Key ===
- Q = Qualifier
- WC = Wild card
- LL = Lucky loser
- Alt = Alternate
- ITF = ITF entry
- PR = Protected ranking
- SR = Special ranking
- SE = Special exempt
- JE = Junior exempt
- JR = Junior Accelerator Programme entrant
- CO = College Accelerator Programme entrant
- NG = Next Gen Accelerator Program entrant
- w/o = Walkover
- r = Retired
- d = Defaulted

=== Finals ===
Quarterfinals
1	(United States) Serena Williams	3	6	6
23	(Belarus) Victoria Azarenka	6	2	3
4	(Russia) Maria Sharapova	6	6^{3}	6
(United States) CoCo Vandeweghe	3	7^{7}	2
20	(Spain) Garbiñe Muguruza	7	6
15	(Switzerland) Timea Bacsinszky	5	3
21	(United States) Madison Keys	6^{3}	6	3
13	(Poland) Agnieszka Radwańska	7^{7}	3	6

Semifinals
1	(United States) Serena Williams	6	6
4	(Russia) Maria Sharapova	2	4
20	(Spain) Garbiñe Muguruza	6	3	6
13	(Poland) Agnieszka Radwańska	2	6	3

Final
1	(United States) Serena Williams	6	6
20	(Spain) Garbiñe Muguruza	4	4

=== Top half ===
==== Section 1 ====
First round
1	(United States) S Williams	6	6
Q	(Russia) M Gasparyan	4	1
(Hungary) T Babos	7^{7}	6
Q	(Czech Republic) P Cetkovská	6^{4}	3
(Slovakia) D Hantuchová	7	6
(Slovakia) D Cibulková	5	0
(United Kingdom) H Watson	1	6	8
32	(France) C Garcia	6	3	6
19	(Italy) S Errani	6	5	6
(Italy) F Schiavone	2	7	1
(Serbia) A Krunić	6	6
(Italy) R Vinci	2	4
(New Zealand) M Erakovic	6^{5}	5
(Kazakhstan) Y Putintseva	7^{7}	7
(United States) M Brengle	0	0
16	(United States) V Williams	6	6

Second round
1	(United States) S Williams	6	6
(Hungary) T Babos	4	1
(Slovakia) D Hantuchová	4	2
(United Kingdom) H Watson	6	6
19	(Italy) S Errani	3	7^{7}	2
(Serbia) A Krunić	6	6^{2}	6
(Kazakhstan) Y Putintseva	6^{5}	4
16	(United States) V Williams	7^{7}	6

Third round
1	(United States) S Williams	6	4	7
(United Kingdom) H Watson	2	6	5
(Serbia) A Krunić	3	2
16	(United States) V Williams	6	6

Fourth round
1	(United States) S Williams	6	6
16	(United States) V Williams	4	3

==== Section 2 ====
First round
9	(Spain) C Suárez Navarro	2	0
WC	(Latvia) J Ostapenko	6	6
(Romania) A Dulgheru	2	1
(France) K Mladenovic	6	6
(Belgium) K Flipkens	0	6	6
(Germany) A Beck	6	3	4
WC	(Estonia) A Kontaveit	2	1
23	(Belarus) V Azarenka	6	6
30	(Switzerland) B Bencic	3	6	6
(Bulgaria) T Pironkova	6	1	3
(Russia) V Diatchenko	6	3	5
(Germany) A-L Friedsam	3	6	7
(Belgium) A Van Uytvanck	3	2
Q	(United States) B Mattek-Sands	6	6
Q	(China) Y Xu	1	1
7	(Serbia) A Ivanovic	6	6

Second round
WC	(Latvia) J Ostapenko	4	5
(France) K Mladenovic	6	7
(Belgium) K Flipkens	3	3
23	(Belarus) V Azarenka	6	6
30	(Switzerland) B Bencic	7	4	6
(Germany) A-L Friedsam	5	6	0
Q	(United States) B Mattek-Sands	6	6
7	(Serbia) A Ivanovic	3	4

Third round
(France) K Mladenovic	4	4
23	(Belarus) V Azarenka	6	6
30	(Switzerland) B Bencic	7	7
Q	(United States) B Mattek-Sands	5	5

Fourth round
23	(Belarus) V Azarenka	6	6
30	(Switzerland) B Bencic	2	3

==== Section 3 ====
First round
4	(Russia) M Sharapova	6	6
WC	(United Kingdom) J Konta	2	2
Q	(Netherlands) R Hogenkamp	6	6
(China) Q Wang	4	4
(United States) N Gibbs	3	3
(Ukraine) L Tsurenko	6	6
(Australia) D Gavrilova	6^{6}	1
29	(Romania) I-C Begu	7^{8}	6
24	(Italy) F Pennetta	3	6	4
(Kazakhstan) Z Diyas	6	2	6
(China) L Zhu	6	5	1
Q	(Belarus) A Sasnovich	4	7	6
(Colombia) M Duque Mariño	7^{7}	6
WC	(United Kingdom) N Broady	6^{5}	3
(United States) S Rogers	0	0
14	(Germany) A Petkovic	6	6

Second round
4	(Russia) M Sharapova	6	6
Q	(Netherlands) R Hogenkamp	3	1
(Ukraine) L Tsurenko	5	7^{7}	5
29	(Romania) I-C Begu	7	6^{4}	7
(Kazakhstan) Z Diyas	7	6
Q	(Belarus) A Sasnovich	5	1
(Colombia) M Duque Mariño	3	1
14	(Germany) A Petkovic	6	6

Third round
4	(Russia) M Sharapova	6	6
29	(Romania) I-C Begu	4	3
(Kazakhstan) Z Diyas	7	6
14	(Germany) A Petkovic	5	4

Fourth round
4	(Russia) M Sharapova	6	6
(Kazakhstan) Z Diyas	4	4

==== Section 4 ====
First round
11	(Czech Republic) Ka Plíšková	6	4	6
(United States) I Falconi	4	6	1
(United States) C Vandeweghe	6	6
(Slovakia) AK Schmiedlová	4	2
PR	(United States) E Gallovits-Hall	2	1
(Poland) U Radwańska	6	6
(Montenegro) D Kovinić	4	4
22	(Australia) S Stosur	6	6
27	(Czech Republic) B Strýcová	4	2
(United States) S Stephens	6	6
(Slovenia) P Hercog	4	6^{3}
(United States) L Davis	6	7^{7}
Q	(Chinese Taipei) S-w Hsieh	6	6
(Estonia) K Kanepi	1	4
(United States) A Riske	6	5	3
6	(Czech Republic) L Šafářová	3	7	6

Second round
11	(Czech Republic) Ka Plíšková	6^{5}	4
(United States) C Vandeweghe	7^{7}	6
(Poland) U Radwańska	3	4
22	(Australia) S Stosur	6	6
(United States) S Stephens	6	6
(United States) L Davis	4	4
Q	(Chinese Taipei) S-w Hsieh	2	3
6	(Czech Republic) L Šafářová	6	6

Third round
(United States) C Vandeweghe	6	6
22	(Australia) S Stosur	2	0
(United States) S Stephens	6	3	1
6	(Czech Republic) L Šafářová	3	6	6

Fourth round
(United States) C Vandeweghe	7^{7}	7^{7}
6	(Czech Republic) L Šafářová	6^{1}	6^{4}

=== Bottom half ===
==== Section 5 ====
First round
5	(Denmark) C Wozniacki	7	6
(China) S Zheng	5	0
(Czech Republic) K Siniaková	2	6	3
(Czech Republic) D Allertová	6	4	6
(Spain) L Arruabarrena	6	6
(France) P Parmentier	4	2
(Brazil) T Pereira	6^{4}	3
31	(Italy) C Giorgi	7^{7}	6
20	(Spain) G Muguruza	6	6
(United States) V Lepchenko	4	1
(Croatia) M Lučić-Baroni	7	6^{5}	7
(Kazakhstan) Y Shvedova	5	7^{7}	5
(Russia) A Pavlyuchenkova	6^{3}	7^{7}	6
(Germany) M Barthel	7^{7}	6^{4}	2
(Germany) C Witthöft	0	0
10	(Germany) A Kerber	6	6

Second round
5	(Denmark) C Wozniacki	6	7^{8}
(Czech Republic) D Allertová	1	6^{6}
(Spain) L Arruabarrena	0	6^{5}
31	(Italy) C Giorgi	6	7^{7}
20	(Spain) G Muguruza	6	4	6
(Croatia) M Lučić-Baroni	3	6	2
(Russia) A Pavlyuchenkova	5	2
10	(Germany) A Kerber	7	6

Third round
5	(Denmark) C Wozniacki	6	6
31	(Italy) C Giorgi	2	2
20	(Spain) G Muguruza	7^{14}	1	6
10	(Germany) A Kerber	6^{12}	6	2

Fourth round
5	(Denmark) C Wozniacki	4	4
20	(Spain) G Muguruza	6	6

==== Section 6 ====
First round
15	(Switzerland) T Bacsinszky	6	7
(Germany) J Görges	2	5
(Bulgaria) S Karatantcheva	6	2	5
(Spain) S Soler Espinosa	2	6	7
(Sweden) J Larsson	3	2
(United States) C McHale	6	6
(Australia) J Gajdošová	5	4
18	(Germany) S Lisicki	7	6
26	(Russia) S Kuznetsova	6	6
Q	(Germany) L Siegemund	3	4
(Czech Republic) Kr Plíšková	3	7	7
(Czech Republic) T Smitková	6	5	5
(Puerto Rico) M Puig	7	3	1
(Romania) M Niculescu	5	6	6
(Slovakia) J Čepelová	5	6	6
3	(Romania) S Halep	7	4	3

Second round
15	(Switzerland) T Bacsinszky	6	6
(Spain) S Soler Espinosa	2	1
(United States) C McHale	6	5	1
18	(Germany) S Lisicki	2	7	6
26	(Russia) S Kuznetsova	6	3	4
(Czech Republic) Kr Plíšková	3	6	6
(Romania) M Niculescu	6	6
(Slovakia) J Čepelová	3	3

Third round
15	(Switzerland) T Bacsinszky	6	6
18	(Germany) S Lisicki	3	2
(Czech Republic) Kr Plíšková	3	5
(Romania) M Niculescu	6	7

Fourth round
15	(Switzerland) T Bacsinszky	1	7	6
(Romania) M Niculescu	6	5	2

==== Section 7 ====
First round
8	(Russia) E Makarova	6	6
Q	(United States) S Vickery	2	4
(Italy) K Knapp	6^{6}	0^{r}
(Slovakia) M Rybáriková	7^{8}	3
(Romania) A Mitu	1	1
Q	(Belarus) O Govortsova	6	6
(Croatia) A Konjuh	2	2
25	(France) A Cornet	6	6
21	(United States) M Keys	6^{6}	6	6
(Switzerland) S Vögele	7^{8}	3	4
(Belgium) Y Wickmayer	6	6^{6}	8
(Russia) E Kulichkova	3	7^{8}	10
(Germany) T Maria	7^{7}	7
(Serbia) B Jovanovski	6^{2}	5
Q	(China) Y Duan	7^{7}	6
12	(Canada) E Bouchard	6^{3}	4

Second round
8	(Russia) E Makarova	2	5
(Slovakia) M Rybáriková	6	7
Q	(Belarus) O Govortsova	7^{8}	2	6
25	(France) A Cornet	6^{6}	6	1
21	(United States) M Keys	6	7^{7}
(Russia) E Kulichkova	4	6^{3}
(Germany) T Maria	1	6	10
Q	(China) Y Duan	6	2	8

Third round
(Slovakia) M Rybáriková	6^{4}	3
Q	(Belarus) O Govortsova	7^{7}	6
21	(United States) M Keys	6	6
(Germany) T Maria	4	4

Fourth round
Q	(Belarus) O Govortsova	6	4	1
21	(United States) M Keys	3	6	6

==== Section 8 ====
First round
13	(Poland) A Radwańska	6	6
(Czech Republic) L Hradecká	3	2
(Australia) A Tomljanović	6	6
(Czech Republic) K Koukalová	3	4
Q	(Austria) T Paszek	2	2
(Australia) C Dellacqua	6	6
(Japan) M Doi	6	3	2
17	(Ukraine) E Svitolina	3	6	6
28	(Serbia) J Janković	6	3	10
(Russia) E Vesnina	4	6	8
(Russia) E Rodina	6	6
WC	(United Kingdom) L Robson	4	4
(Poland) M Linette	6	3	3^{r}
(Japan) K Nara	3	6	4
(Netherlands) K Bertens	1	0
2	(Czech Republic) P Kvitová	6	6

Second round
13	(Poland) A Radwańska	6	6
(Australia) A Tomljanović	0	2
(Australia) C Dellacqua	7^{7}	6
17	(Ukraine) E Svitolina	6^{3}	3
28	(Serbia) J Janković	6^{4}	6	6
(Russia) E Rodina	7^{7}	1	3
(Japan) K Nara	2	0
2	(Czech Republic) P Kvitová	6	6

Third round
13	(Poland) A Radwańska	6	6
(Australia) C Dellacqua	1	4
28	(Serbia) J Janković	3	7	6
2	(Czech Republic) P Kvitová	6	5	4

Fourth round
13	(Poland) A Radwańska	7	6
28	(Serbia) J Janković	5	4

== Championship match statistics ==
Category	(United States) S. Williams	(Spain) Muguruza
1st serve %	37/68 (54%)	43/61 (70%)
1st serve points won	29 of 37 = 78%	23 of 43 = 53%
2nd serve points won	11 of 31 = 35%	6 of 18 = 33%
Total service points won	40 of 68 = 58.82%	29 of 61 = 47.54%
Aces	12	3
Double faults	8	2
Winners	16	6
Unforced errors	10	13
Net points won	6 of 8 = 75%	5 of 5 = 100%
Break points converted	5 of 8 = 63%	3 of 10 = 30%
Return points won	32 of 61 = 52%	28 of 68 = 41%
Total points won	72	57

Preceded by 2015 French Open – Women's singles	Grand Slams; Women's Singles	Succeeded by 2015 US Open – Women's singles
