= 2015 Wimbledon Championships – Women's doubles =

Women's doubles
- 2015 Wimbledon Championships

Final
- Champions: (Switzerland) Martina Hingis (India) Sania Mirza
- Runners-up: (Russia) Ekaterina Makarova (Russia) Elena Vesnina
- Score: 5–7, 7–6^{(7–4)}, 7–5

Details
- Draw: 64 (4Q / 3WC)
- Seeds: 16

Events
Singles	men	women		boys	girls
Doubles	men	women	mixed	boys	girls
WC Singles	men	women	quad
WC Doubles	men	women	quad
Legends	men	women	seniors
- Wimbledon Championships

Martina Hingis and Sania Mirza defeated Ekaterina Makarova and Elena Vesnina in the final, 5–7, 7–6^{(7–4)}, 7–5 to win the women's doubles tennis title at the 2015 Wimbledon Championships. It was Mirza's first major women's doubles title, becoming the first Indian to win a women's doubles major; while Hingis won her tenth title in the category, and her first since the 2002 Australian Open.

Sara Errani and Roberta Vinci were the reigning champions, but Errani chose not to participate this year. Vinci played alongside Karin Knapp, but lost in the third round to Casey Dellacqua and Yaroslava Shvedova.

== Seeds ==
1. (Switzerland) Martina Hingis / (India) Sania Mirza (champions)
2. (Russia) Ekaterina Makarova / (Russia) Elena Vesnina (final)
3. (United States) Bethanie Mattek-Sands / (Czech Republic) Lucie Šafářová (quarterfinals)
4. (Hungary) Tímea Babos / (France) Kristina Mladenovic (semifinals)
5. (United States) Raquel Kops-Jones / (United States) Abigail Spears (semifinals)
6. (Spain) Garbiñe Muguruza / (Spain) Carla Suárez Navarro (second round)
7. (Chinese Taipei) Hsieh Su-wei / (Italy) Flavia Pennetta (quarterfinals)
8. (Czech Republic) Andrea Hlaváčková / (Czech Republic) Lucie Hradecká (second round)
9. (Australia) Casey Dellacqua / (Kazakhstan) Yaroslava Shvedova (quarterfinals)
10. (France) Caroline Garcia / (Slovenia) Katarina Srebotnik (second round)
11. (Russia) Alla Kudryavtseva / (Russia) Anastasia Pavlyuchenkova (third round)
12. (United States) Serena Williams / (United States) Venus Williams (withdrew)
13. (Chinese Taipei) Chan Yung-jan / (China) Zheng Jie (first round)
14. (Netherlands) Michaëlla Krajicek / (Czech Republic) Barbora Strýcová (third round)
15. (Australia) Anastasia Rodionova / (Australia) Arina Rodionova (second round)
16. (Spain) Anabel Medina Garrigues / (Spain) Arantxa Parra Santonja (third round)

Click on the seed number of a player to go to their draw section.

== Draw ==
Key

- Q = Qualifier
- WC = Wild card
- LL = Lucky loser
- Alt = Alternate
- ITF = ITF entry
- PR = Protected ranking
- SR = Special ranking
- SE = Special exempt
- JE = Junior exempt
- JR = Junior Accelerator Programme entrant
- CO = College Accelerator Programme entrant
- NG = Next Gen Accelerator Program entrant
- w/o = Walkover
- r = Retired
- d = Defaulted

=== Finals ===
Quarterfinals
1	(Switzerland) Martina Hingis (India) Sania Mirza	7	6
9	(Australia) Casey Dellacqua (Kazakhstan) Yaroslava Shvedova	5	3
3	(United States) Bethanie Mattek-Sands (Czech Republic) Lucie Šafářová	3	2
5	(United States) Raquel Kops-Jones (United States) Abigail Spears	6	6
7	(Chinese Taipei) Hsieh Su-wei (Italy) Flavia Pennetta	3	6	4
4	(Hungary) Tímea Babos (France) Kristina Mladenovic	6	4	6
(Zimbabwe) Cara Black (United States) Lisa Raymond	3	6	6
2	(Russia) Ekaterina Makarova (Russia) Elena Vesnina	6	4	8

Semifinals
1	(Switzerland) Martina Hingis (India) Sania Mirza	6	6
5	(United States) Raquel Kops-Jones (United States) Abigail Spears	1	2
4	(Hungary) Tímea Babos (France) Kristina Mladenovic	3	6	4
2	(Russia) Ekaterina Makarova (Russia) Elena Vesnina	6	4	6

Final
1	(Switzerland) Martina Hingis (India) Sania Mirza	5	7^{7}	7
2	(Russia) Ekaterina Makarova (Russia) Elena Vesnina	7	6^{4}	5

=== Top half ===
==== Section 1 ====
First round
1	(Switzerland) M Hingis (India) S Mirza	6	6
(Kazakhstan) Z Diyas (China) S Zheng	2	2
(Poland) K Jans-Ignacik (Slovenia) A Klepač	4	2
(Japan) K Date-Krumm (Italy) F Schiavone	6	6
(Serbia) B Jovanovski (Ukraine) N Kichenok	4	6^{4}
(New Zealand) M Erakovic (United Kingdom) H Watson	6	7^{7}
Q	(Russia) E Kulichkova (Russia) E Rodina	6	3	4
16	(Spain) A Medina Garrigues (Spain) A Parra Santonja	3	6	6
9	(Australia) C Dellacqua (Kazakhstan) Y Shvedova	6	6
(Canada) G Dabrowski (Poland) A Rosolska	4	4
(Slovakia) D Hantuchová (Australia) S Stosur	6	7
PR	(Slovakia) J Husárová (Poland) P Kania	1	5
(Italy) K Knapp (Italy) R Vinci	6	6
LL	(Chinese Taipei) C-w Chan (United States) N Melichar	2	4
(France) A Cornet (Serbia) A Krunić	1	4
8	(Czech Republic) A Hlaváčková (Czech Republic) L Hradecká	6	6

Second round
1	(Switzerland) M Hingis (India) S Mirza	6	6
(Japan) K Date-Krumm (Italy) F Schiavone	0	1
(New Zealand) M Erakovic (United Kingdom) H Watson	6^{2}	6	0
16	(Spain) A Medina Garrigues (Spain) A Parra Santonja	7^{7}	3	6
9	(Australia) C Dellacqua (Kazakhstan) Y Shvedova	6	6
(Slovakia) D Hantuchová (Australia) S Stosur	3	0
(Italy) K Knapp (Italy) R Vinci	6	3	6
8	(Czech Republic) A Hlaváčková (Czech Republic) L Hradecká	3	6	4

Third round
1	(Switzerland) M Hingis (India) S Mirza	6	6
16	(Spain) A Medina Garrigues (Spain) A Parra Santonja	4	3
9	(Australia) C Dellacqua (Kazakhstan) Y Shvedova	4	6	8
(Italy) K Knapp (Italy) R Vinci	6	2	6

Quarterfinals
1	(Switzerland) M Hingis (India) S Mirza	7	6
9	(Australia) C Dellacqua (Kazakhstan) Y Shvedova	5	3

==== Section 2 ====
First round
3	(United States) B Mattek-Sands (Czech Republic) L Šafářová	6	6
WC	(United Kingdom) N Broady (United Kingdom) E Webley-Smith	3	2
LL	(Slovakia) J Čepelová (Switzerland) S Vögele	2	1
WC	(United Kingdom) J Rae (United Kingdom) A Smith	6	6
(United States) V Lepchenko (United States) C McHale	4	4
(Spain) L Arruabarrena (Romania) I-C Begu	6	6
(Australia) J Gajdošová (Australia) A Tomljanović	2	6	6
13	(Chinese Taipei) Y-j Chan (China) J Zheng	6	4	2
LL	(Japan) M Doi (Liechtenstein) S Vogt	3	6^{5}
WC	(United Kingdom) J Konta (United States) M Sanchez	6	7^{7}
(Germany) J Görges (Germany) C Witthöft	2	2
(Chinese Taipei) H-c Chan (Belgium) A Van Uytvanck	6	6
(Croatia) D Jurak (Croatia) A Konjuh	6	6
(Serbia) J Janković (Croatia) M Lučić-Baroni	3	3
(Netherlands) K Bertens (United States) A Riske	3	2
5	(United States) R Kops-Jones (United States) A Spears	6	6

Second round
3	(United States) B Mattek-Sands (Czech Republic) L Šafářová	6	6
WC	(United Kingdom) J Rae (United Kingdom) A Smith	3	0
(Spain) L Arruabarrena (Romania) I-C Begu	4	4
(Australia) J Gajdošová (Australia) A Tomljanović	6	6
WC	(United Kingdom) J Konta (United States) M Sanchez	6^{5}	2
(Chinese Taipei) H-c Chan (Belgium) A Van Uytvanck	7^{7}	6
(Croatia) D Jurak (Croatia) A Konjuh	3	4
5	(United States) R Kops-Jones (United States) A Spears	6	6

Third round
3	(United States) B Mattek-Sands (Czech Republic) L Šafářová	7	6
(Australia) J Gajdošová (Australia) A Tomljanović	5	2
(Chinese Taipei) H-c Chan (Belgium) A Van Uytvanck	2	4
5	(United States) R Kops-Jones (United States) A Spears	6	6

Quarterfinals
3	(United States) B Mattek-Sands (Czech Republic) L Šafářová	3	2
5	(United States) R Kops-Jones (United States) A Spears	6	6

=== Bottom half ===
==== Section 3 ====
First round
7	(Chinese Taipei) S-w Hsieh (Italy) F Pennetta	6	6
(Romania) E Bogdan (Romania) S Halep	4	1
(Russia) M Gasparyan (Russia) A Panova	6	4	6
PR	(Belgium) Y Bonaventure (Hungary) K Marosi	1	6	2
(Germany) A-L Grönefeld (United States) C Vandeweghe	7	6
(United States) M Brengle (Germany) T Maria	5	4
(Czech Republic) T Smitková (China) Y Xu	1	6	2
10	(France) C Garcia (Slovenia) K Srebotnik	6	4	6
14	(Netherlands) M Krajicek (Czech Republic) B Strýcová	7	7
(Japan) S Aoyama (Czech Republic) R Voráčová	5	5
PR	(Russia) V Dushevina (Spain) MJ Martínez Sánchez	6	6
(Czech Republic) K Koukalová (Bulgaria) T Pironkova	2	4
(Czech Republic) Ka Plíšková (Czech Republic) Kr Plíšková	6	4	4
(Romania) M Niculescu (Ukraine) O Savchuk	2	6	6
Q	(Poland) M Linette (Luxembourg) M Minella	4	1
4	(Hungary) T Babos (France) K Mladenovic	6	6

Second round
7	(Chinese Taipei) S-w Hsieh (Italy) F Pennetta	6	6
(Russia) M Gasparyan (Russia) A Panova	3	4
(Germany) A-L Grönefeld (United States) C Vandeweghe	7^{7}	6
10	(France) C Garcia (Slovenia) K Srebotnik	6^{3}	3
14	(Netherlands) M Krajicek (Czech Republic) B Strýcová	6	7^{9}
PR	(Russia) V Dushevina (Spain) MJ Martínez Sánchez	3	6^{7}
(Romania) M Niculescu (Ukraine) O Savchuk	4	4
4	(Hungary) T Babos (France) K Mladenovic	6	6

Third round
7	(Chinese Taipei) S-w Hsieh (Italy) F Pennetta	3	6	9
(Germany) A-L Grönefeld (United States) C Vandeweghe	6	0	7
14	(Netherlands) M Krajicek (Czech Republic) B Strýcová	4	2
4	(Hungary) T Babos (France) K Mladenovic	6	6

Quarterfinals
7	(Chinese Taipei) S-w Hsieh (Italy) F Pennetta	3	6	4
4	(Hungary) T Babos (France) K Mladenovic	6	4	6

==== Section 4 ====
First round
6	(Spain) G Muguruza (Spain) C Suárez Navarro	6	6
(Romania) A Dulgheru (Spain) S Soler Espinosa	4	2
(Zimbabwe) C Black (United States) L Raymond	5	6	7
Q	(Sweden) J Larsson (Croatia) P Martić	7	3	5
(China) C Liang (Romania) R Olaru	5	5
(Switzerland) B Bencic (Czech Republic) K Siniaková	7	7
(Germany) A Petkovic (Slovakia) M Rybáriková	5	4
11	(Russia) A Kudryavtseva (Russia) A Pavlyuchenkova	7	6
15	(Australia) An Rodionova (Australia) Ar Rodionova	6^{6}	6	6
(United States) I Falconi (Australia) D Gavrilova	7^{8}	2	0
(Switzerland) T Bacsinszky (Chinese Taipei) C-j Chuang	5	3
(Germany) M Barthel (Ukraine) L Kichenok	7	6
(United States) L Davis (Japan) K Nara	6	6
Q	(China) Y Wang (China) K Zhang	4	4
PR	(United States) M Keys (United Kingdom) L Robson	4	1
2	(Russia) E Makarova (Russia) E Vesnina	6	6

Second round
6	(Spain) G Muguruza (Spain) C Suárez Navarro	3	1
(Zimbabwe) C Black (United States) L Raymond	6	6
(Switzerland) B Bencic (Czech Republic) K Siniaková	1	2
11	(Russia) A Kudryavtseva (Russia) A Pavlyuchenkova	6	6
15	(Australia) An Rodionova (Australia) Ar Rodionova	3	6	4
(Germany) M Barthel (Ukraine) L Kichenok	6	3	6
(United States) L Davis (Japan) K Nara	4	1
2	(Russia) E Makarova (Russia) E Vesnina	6	6

Third round
(Zimbabwe) C Black (United States) L Raymond	2	6	6
11	(Russia) A Kudryavtseva (Russia) A Pavlyuchenkova	6	3	4
(Germany) M Barthel (Ukraine) L Kichenok	3	1
2	(Russia) E Makarova (Russia) E Vesnina	6	6

Quarterfinals
(Zimbabwe) C Black (United States) L Raymond	3	6	6
2	(Russia) E Makarova (Russia) E Vesnina	6	4	8
