= 2016 ATP World Tour =

Men's tennis circuit

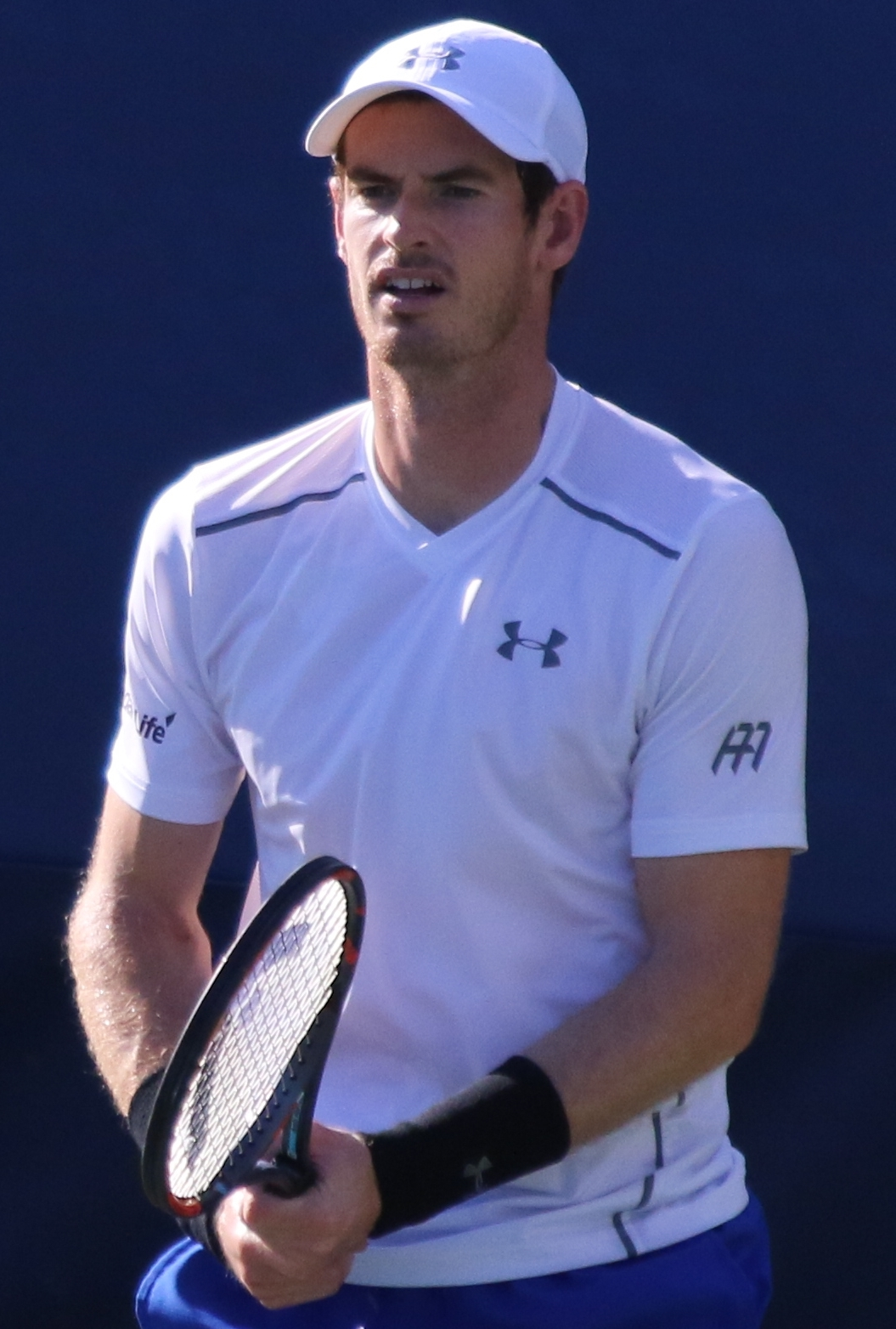
- Andy Murray finished the year as world No. 1 for the first time in his career. He won nine tournaments during the season, including a major at the Wimbledon Championships, the gold medal at the Rio Olympics, and the ATP World Tour Finals. He also won three Masters 1000 titles and finished runner-up at two other majors, the Australian Open and the French Open.

Details
- Duration: 3 January 2016 – 27 November 2016
- Edition: 47th
- Tournaments: 67
- Categories: Grand Slam (4); ATP World Tour Finals; Summer Olympic Games; ATP World Tour Masters 1000 (9); ATP World Tour 500 (13); ATP World Tour 250 (39)

Achievements (singles)
- Most titles: (United Kingdom) Andy Murray (9)
- Most finals: (United Kingdom) Andy Murray (13)
- Prize money leader: (United Kingdom) Andy Murray ($16,327,821)
- Points leader: (United Kingdom) Andy Murray (12,410)

Awards
- Player of the year: (United Kingdom) Andy Murray
- Doubles team of the year: (United Kingdom) Jamie Murray (Brazil) Bruno Soares
- Most improved player of the year: (France) Lucas Pouille
- Star of tomorrow: (United States) Taylor Fritz
- Comeback player of the year: (Argentina) Juan Martín del Potro

The 2016 ATP World Tour was the global elite professional tennis circuit organized by the Association of Tennis Professionals (ATP) for the 2016 tennis season. The 2016 ATP World Tour calendar comprised the Grand Slam tournaments (supervised by the International Tennis Federation (ITF)), the ATP World Tour Masters 1000s, the ATP World Tour 500 series, the ATP World Tour 250 series, the Davis Cup (organized by the ITF), and the ATP World Tour Finals. Additionally, the 2016 calendar included the 2016 Summer Olympics and Hopman Cup, neither of which distributing ranking points.

== Schedule ==
This is the complete schedule of events on the 2016 calendar, with player progression documented from the quarterfinals stage.

Key

Grand Slam
ATP World Tour Finals
Olympic Games
ATP World Tour Masters 1000
ATP World Tour 500
ATP World Tour 250
Team Events

=== January ===
Week	Tournament	Champions	Runners-up	Semifinalists	Quarterfinalists
4 Jan	Hopman Cup; Perth, Australia; ITF Mixed Team Championships; Hard (i) – $1,000,000 – 8 teams (RR)	Australia Green; 2–0	Ukraine	Round robin (Group A) Czech Republic; Australia Gold; United States	Round robin (Group B) Great Britain; France; Germany
4 Jan	Qatar Open; Doha, Qatar; ATP World Tour 250; Hard – $1,283,855 – 32S/16D; Singles – Doubles	(Serbia) Novak Djokovic; 6–1, 6–2	(Spain) Rafael Nadal	(Czech Republic) Tomáš Berdych (Ukraine) Illya Marchenko	(Argentina) Leonardo Mayer (United Kingdom) Kyle Edmund (France) Jérémy Chardy (Russia) Andrey Kuznetsov
4 Jan	Qatar Open; Doha, Qatar; ATP World Tour 250; Hard – $1,283,855 – 32S/16D; Singles – Doubles	(Spain) Feliciano López (Spain) Marc López; 6–4, 6–3	(Germany) Philipp Petzschner (Austria) Alexander Peya	(Czech Republic) Tomáš Berdych (Ukraine) Illya Marchenko	(Argentina) Leonardo Mayer (United Kingdom) Kyle Edmund (France) Jérémy Chardy (Russia) Andrey Kuznetsov
4 Jan	Chennai Open; Chennai, India; ATP World Tour 250; Hard – $482,085 – 28S/16D; Singles – Doubles	(Switzerland) Stan Wawrinka; 6–3, 7–5	(Croatia) Borna Ćorić	(France) Benoît Paire (United Kingdom) Aljaž Bedene	(Spain) Guillermo García López (Italy) Thomas Fabbiano (Spain) Roberto Bautista Agut (India) Ramkumar Ramanathan
4 Jan	Chennai Open; Chennai, India; ATP World Tour 250; Hard – $482,085 – 28S/16D; Singles – Doubles	(Austria) Oliver Marach (France) Fabrice Martin; 6–3, 7–5	(United States) Austin Krajicek (France) Benoît Paire	(France) Benoît Paire (United Kingdom) Aljaž Bedene	(Spain) Guillermo García López (Italy) Thomas Fabbiano (Spain) Roberto Bautista Agut (India) Ramkumar Ramanathan
4 Jan	Brisbane International; Brisbane, Australia; ATP World Tour 250; Hard – $461,330 – 28S/16D; Singles – Doubles	(Canada) Milos Raonic; 6–4, 6–4	(Switzerland) Roger Federer	(Austria) Dominic Thiem (Australia) Bernard Tomic	(Bulgaria) Grigor Dimitrov (Croatia) Marin Čilić (France) Lucas Pouille (Japan) Kei Nishikori
4 Jan	Brisbane International; Brisbane, Australia; ATP World Tour 250; Hard – $461,330 – 28S/16D; Singles – Doubles	(Finland) Henri Kontinen (Australia) John Peers; 7–6^{(7–4)}, 6–1	(Australia) James Duckworth (Australia) Chris Guccione	(Austria) Dominic Thiem (Australia) Bernard Tomic	(Bulgaria) Grigor Dimitrov (Croatia) Marin Čilić (France) Lucas Pouille (Japan) Kei Nishikori
11 Jan	Auckland Open; Auckland, New Zealand; ATP World Tour 250; Hard – $520,070 – 28S/16D; Singles – Doubles	(Spain) Roberto Bautista Agut; 6–1, 1–0 ret.	(United States) Jack Sock	(Spain) David Ferrer (France) Jo-Wilfried Tsonga	(Czech Republic) Lukáš Rosol (South Africa) Kevin Anderson (United States) John Isner (Italy) Fabio Fognini
11 Jan	Auckland Open; Auckland, New Zealand; ATP World Tour 250; Hard – $520,070 – 28S/16D; Singles – Doubles	(Croatia) Mate Pavić (New Zealand) Michael Venus; 7–5, 6–4	(United States) Eric Butorac (United States) Scott Lipsky	(Spain) David Ferrer (France) Jo-Wilfried Tsonga	(Czech Republic) Lukáš Rosol (South Africa) Kevin Anderson (United States) John Isner (Italy) Fabio Fognini
11 Jan	Sydney International; Sydney, Australia; ATP World Tour 250; Hard – $461,330 – 28S/16D; Singles – Doubles	(Serbia) Viktor Troicki; 2–6, 6–1, 7–6^{(9–7)}	(Bulgaria) Grigor Dimitrov	(Russia) Teymuraz Gabashvili (Luxembourg) Gilles Müller	(Australia) Bernard Tomic (France) Nicolas Mahut (Ukraine) Alexandr Dolgopolov (France) Jérémy Chardy
11 Jan	Sydney International; Sydney, Australia; ATP World Tour 250; Hard – $461,330 – 28S/16D; Singles – Doubles	(United Kingdom) Jamie Murray (Brazil) Bruno Soares; 6–3, 7–6^{(8–6)}	(India) Rohan Bopanna (Romania) Florin Mergea	(Russia) Teymuraz Gabashvili (Luxembourg) Gilles Müller	(Australia) Bernard Tomic (France) Nicolas Mahut (Ukraine) Alexandr Dolgopolov (France) Jérémy Chardy
18 Jan; 25 Jan	Australian Open; Melbourne, Australia; Grand Slam; Hard – A$19,927,000; 128S/64D/32X; Singles – Doubles – Mixed	(Serbia) Novak Djokovic; 6–1, 7–5, 7–6^{(7–3)}	(United Kingdom) Andy Murray	(Switzerland) Roger Federer (Canada) Milos Raonic	(Japan) Kei Nishikori (Czech Republic) Tomáš Berdych (France) Gaël Monfils (Spain) David Ferrer
18 Jan; 25 Jan	Australian Open; Melbourne, Australia; Grand Slam; Hard – A$19,927,000; 128S/64D/32X; Singles – Doubles – Mixed	(United Kingdom) Jamie Murray (Brazil) Bruno Soares; 2–6, 6–4, 7–5	(Canada) Daniel Nestor (Czech Republic) Radek Štěpánek	(Switzerland) Roger Federer (Canada) Milos Raonic	(Japan) Kei Nishikori (Czech Republic) Tomáš Berdych (France) Gaël Monfils (Spain) David Ferrer
18 Jan; 25 Jan	Australian Open; Melbourne, Australia; Grand Slam; Hard – A$19,927,000; 128S/64D/32X; Singles – Doubles – Mixed	(Russia) Elena Vesnina (Brazil) Bruno Soares; 6–4, 4–6, [10–5]	(United States) CoCo Vandeweghe (Romania) Horia Tecău	(Switzerland) Roger Federer (Canada) Milos Raonic	(Japan) Kei Nishikori (Czech Republic) Tomáš Berdych (France) Gaël Monfils (Spain) David Ferrer

=== February ===
Week	Tournament	Champions	Runners-up	Semifinalists	Quarterfinalists
1 Feb	Open Sud de France; Montpellier, France; ATP World Tour 250; Hard (i) – €520,070 – 28S/16D; Singles – Doubles	(France) Richard Gasquet; 7–5, 6–4	(France) Paul-Henri Mathieu	(Germany) Dustin Brown (Germany) Alexander Zverev	(Cyprus) Marcos Baghdatis (Belgium) Ruben Bemelmans (Australia) John Millman (Germany) Michael Berrer
1 Feb	Open Sud de France; Montpellier, France; ATP World Tour 250; Hard (i) – €520,070 – 28S/16D; Singles – Doubles	(Croatia) Mate Pavić (New Zealand) Michael Venus; 7–5, 7–6^{(7–4)}	(Germany) Alexander Zverev (Germany) Mischa Zverev	(Germany) Dustin Brown (Germany) Alexander Zverev	(Cyprus) Marcos Baghdatis (Belgium) Ruben Bemelmans (Australia) John Millman (Germany) Michael Berrer
1 Feb	Sofia Open; Sofia, Bulgaria; ATP World Tour 250; Hard (i) – €520,070 – 28S/16D; Singles – Doubles	(Spain) Roberto Bautista Agut; 6–3, 6–4	(Serbia) Viktor Troicki	(Luxembourg) Gilles Müller (Slovakia) Martin Kližan	(France) Adrian Mannarino (Spain) Guillermo García López (Italy) Andreas Seppi (Germany) Philipp Kohlschreiber
1 Feb	Sofia Open; Sofia, Bulgaria; ATP World Tour 250; Hard (i) – €520,070 – 28S/16D; Singles – Doubles	(Netherlands) Wesley Koolhof (Netherlands) Matwé Middelkoop; 5–7, 7–6^{(11–9)}, [10–6]	(Austria) Philipp Oswald (Canada) Adil Shamasdin	(Luxembourg) Gilles Müller (Slovakia) Martin Kližan	(France) Adrian Mannarino (Spain) Guillermo García López (Italy) Andreas Seppi (Germany) Philipp Kohlschreiber
1 Feb	Ecuador Open; Quito, Ecuador; ATP World Tour 250; Clay (red) – $520,070 – 28S/16D; Singles – Doubles	(Dominican Republic) Víctor Estrella Burgos; 4–6, 7–6^{(7–5)}, 6–2	(Brazil) Thomaz Bellucci	(Italy) Paolo Lorenzi (Spain) Albert Ramos Viñolas	(Australia) Bernard Tomic (Spain) Pablo Carreño Busta (Argentina) Renzo Olivo (Spain) Feliciano López
1 Feb	Ecuador Open; Quito, Ecuador; ATP World Tour 250; Clay (red) – $520,070 – 28S/16D; Singles – Doubles	(Spain) Pablo Carreño Busta (Argentina) Guillermo Durán; 7–5, 6–4	(Brazil) Thomaz Bellucci (Brazil) Marcelo Demoliner	(Italy) Paolo Lorenzi (Spain) Albert Ramos Viñolas	(Australia) Bernard Tomic (Spain) Pablo Carreño Busta (Argentina) Renzo Olivo (Spain) Feliciano López
8 Feb	Rotterdam Open; Rotterdam, Netherlands; ATP World Tour 500; Hard (i) – €1,722,820 – 32S/16D; Singles – Doubles	(Slovakia) Martin Kližan; 6–7^{(1–7)}, 6–3, 6–1	(France) Gaël Monfils	(France) Nicolas Mahut (Germany) Philipp Kohlschreiber	(Serbia) Viktor Troicki (Spain) Roberto Bautista Agut (Germany) Alexander Zverev (Croatia) Marin Čilić
8 Feb	Rotterdam Open; Rotterdam, Netherlands; ATP World Tour 500; Hard (i) – €1,722,820 – 32S/16D; Singles – Doubles	(France) Nicolas Mahut (Canada) Vasek Pospisil; 7–6^{(7–2)}, 6–4	(Germany) Philipp Petzschner (Austria) Alexander Peya	(France) Nicolas Mahut (Germany) Philipp Kohlschreiber	(Serbia) Viktor Troicki (Spain) Roberto Bautista Agut (Germany) Alexander Zverev (Croatia) Marin Čilić
8 Feb	Memphis Open; Memphis, United States; ATP World Tour 250; Hard (i) – $693,425 – 28S/16D; Singles – Doubles	(Japan) Kei Nishikori; 6–4, 6–4	(United States) Taylor Fritz	(United States) Sam Querrey (Lithuania) Ričardas Berankis	(Kazakhstan) Mikhail Kukushkin (Japan) Yoshihito Nishioka (United States) Donald Young (Germany) Benjamin Becker
8 Feb	Memphis Open; Memphis, United States; ATP World Tour 250; Hard (i) – $693,425 – 28S/16D; Singles – Doubles	(Poland) Mariusz Fyrstenberg (Mexico) Santiago González; 6–4, 6–4	(United States) Steve Johnson (United States) Sam Querrey	(United States) Sam Querrey (Lithuania) Ričardas Berankis	(Kazakhstan) Mikhail Kukushkin (Japan) Yoshihito Nishioka (United States) Donald Young (Germany) Benjamin Becker
8 Feb	Argentina Open; Buenos Aires, Argentina; ATP World Tour 250; Clay (red) – $598,865 – 28S/16D; Singles – Doubles	(Austria) Dominic Thiem; 7–6^{(7–2)}, 3–6, 7–6^{(7–4)}	(Spain) Nicolás Almagro	(Spain) Rafael Nadal (Spain) David Ferrer	(Italy) Paolo Lorenzi (Serbia) Dušan Lajović (France) Jo-Wilfried Tsonga (Uruguay) Pablo Cuevas
8 Feb	Argentina Open; Buenos Aires, Argentina; ATP World Tour 250; Clay (red) – $598,865 – 28S/16D; Singles – Doubles	(Colombia) Juan Sebastián Cabal (Colombia) Robert Farah; 6–3, 6–0	(Spain) Íñigo Cervantes (Italy) Paolo Lorenzi	(Spain) Rafael Nadal (Spain) David Ferrer	(Italy) Paolo Lorenzi (Serbia) Dušan Lajović (France) Jo-Wilfried Tsonga (Uruguay) Pablo Cuevas
15 Feb	Rio Open; Rio de Janeiro, Brazil; ATP World Tour 500; Clay (red) – $1,471,315 – 32S/16D; Singles – Doubles	(Uruguay) Pablo Cuevas; 6–4, 6–7^{(5–7)}, 6–4	(Argentina) Guido Pella	(Spain) Rafael Nadal (Austria) Dominic Thiem	(Ukraine) Alexandr Dolgopolov (Argentina) Federico Delbonis (Spain) Daniel Gimeno Traver (Spain) David Ferrer
15 Feb	Rio Open; Rio de Janeiro, Brazil; ATP World Tour 500; Clay (red) – $1,471,315 – 32S/16D; Singles – Doubles	(Colombia) Juan Sebastián Cabal (Colombia) Robert Farah; 7–6^{(7–5)}, 6–1	(Spain) Pablo Carreño Busta (Spain) David Marrero	(Spain) Rafael Nadal (Austria) Dominic Thiem	(Ukraine) Alexandr Dolgopolov (Argentina) Federico Delbonis (Spain) Daniel Gimeno Traver (Spain) David Ferrer
15 Feb	Open 13; Marseille, France; ATP World Tour 250; Hard (i) – €665,910 – 28S/16D; Singles – Doubles	(Australia) Nick Kyrgios; 6–2, 7–6^{(7–3)}	(Croatia) Marin Čilić	(France) Benoît Paire (Czech Republic) Tomáš Berdych	(Switzerland) Stan Wawrinka (Russia) Andrey Kuznetsov (France) Richard Gasquet (Belgium) David Goffin
15 Feb	Open 13; Marseille, France; ATP World Tour 250; Hard (i) – €665,910 – 28S/16D; Singles – Doubles	(Croatia) Mate Pavić (New Zealand) Michael Venus; 6–2, 6–3	(Israel) Jonathan Erlich (United Kingdom) Colin Fleming	(France) Benoît Paire (Czech Republic) Tomáš Berdych	(Switzerland) Stan Wawrinka (Russia) Andrey Kuznetsov (France) Richard Gasquet (Belgium) David Goffin
15 Feb	Delray Beach Open; Delray Beach, United States; ATP World Tour 250; Hard – $576,900 – 32S/16D; Singles – Doubles	(United States) Sam Querrey; 6–4, 7–6^{(8–6)}	(United States) Rajeev Ram	(Argentina) Juan Martín del Potro (Bulgaria) Grigor Dimitrov	(United States) Tim Smyczek (France) Jérémy Chardy (France) Adrian Mannarino (Germany) Benjamin Becker
15 Feb	Delray Beach Open; Delray Beach, United States; ATP World Tour 250; Hard – $576,900 – 32S/16D; Singles – Doubles	(Austria) Oliver Marach (France) Fabrice Martin; 3–6, 7–6^{(9–7)}, [13–11]	(United States) Bob Bryan (United States) Mike Bryan	(Argentina) Juan Martín del Potro (Bulgaria) Grigor Dimitrov	(United States) Tim Smyczek (France) Jérémy Chardy (France) Adrian Mannarino (Germany) Benjamin Becker
22 Feb	Dubai Tennis Championships; Dubai, United Arab Emirates; ATP World Tour 500; Hard – $2,674,445 – 32S/16D; Singles – Doubles	(Switzerland) Stan Wawrinka; 6–4, 7–6^{(15–13)}	(Cyprus) Marcos Baghdatis	(Spain) Feliciano López (Australia) Nick Kyrgios	(Serbia) Novak Djokovic (Spain) Roberto Bautista Agut (Czech Republic) Tomáš Berdych (Germany) Philipp Kohlschreiber
22 Feb	Dubai Tennis Championships; Dubai, United Arab Emirates; ATP World Tour 500; Hard – $2,674,445 – 32S/16D; Singles – Doubles	(Italy) Simone Bolelli (Italy) Andreas Seppi; 6–2, 3–6, [14–12]	(Spain) Feliciano López (Spain) Marc López	(Spain) Feliciano López (Australia) Nick Kyrgios	(Serbia) Novak Djokovic (Spain) Roberto Bautista Agut (Czech Republic) Tomáš Berdych (Germany) Philipp Kohlschreiber
22 Feb	Mexican Open; Acapulco, Mexico; ATP World Tour 500; Hard – $1,551,830 – 32S/16D; Singles – Doubles	(Austria) Dominic Thiem; 7–6^{(8–6)}, 4–6, 6–3	(Australia) Bernard Tomic	(Ukraine) Alexandr Dolgopolov (United States) Sam Querrey	(Netherlands) Robin Haase (Ukraine) Illya Marchenko (Bulgaria) Grigor Dimitrov (United States) Taylor Fritz
22 Feb	Mexican Open; Acapulco, Mexico; ATP World Tour 500; Hard – $1,551,830 – 32S/16D; Singles – Doubles	(Philippines) Treat Huey (Belarus) Max Mirnyi; 7–6^{(7–5)}, 6–3	(Germany) Philipp Petzschner (Austria) Alexander Peya	(Ukraine) Alexandr Dolgopolov (United States) Sam Querrey	(Netherlands) Robin Haase (Ukraine) Illya Marchenko (Bulgaria) Grigor Dimitrov (United States) Taylor Fritz
22 Feb	Brasil Open; São Paulo, Brazil; ATP World Tour 250; Clay (red) – $499,055 – 28S/16D; Singles – Doubles	(Uruguay) Pablo Cuevas; 7–6^{(7–4)}, 6–3	(Spain) Pablo Carreño Busta	(Serbia) Dušan Lajović (Spain) Íñigo Cervantes	(Portugal) Gastão Elias (Brazil) Thiago Monteiro (Argentina) Federico Delbonis (Spain) Roberto Carballés Baena
22 Feb	Brasil Open; São Paulo, Brazil; ATP World Tour 250; Clay (red) – $499,055 – 28S/16D; Singles – Doubles	(Chile) Julio Peralta (Argentina) Horacio Zeballos; 4–6, 6–1, [10–5]	(Spain) Pablo Carreño Busta (Spain) David Marrero	(Serbia) Dušan Lajović (Spain) Íñigo Cervantes	(Portugal) Gastão Elias (Brazil) Thiago Monteiro (Argentina) Federico Delbonis (Spain) Roberto Carballés Baena
29 Feb	Davis Cup First Round; Birmingham, United Kingdom – hard (i); Belgrade, Serbia – hard (i); Pesaro, Italy – clay (i); Gdańsk, Poland – hard (i); Baie-Mahault, France – clay Hanover, Germany – hard (i); Kooyong, Australia – grass Liège, Belgium – clay (i)	First-round winners Great Britain 3–1; Serbia 3–2; Italy 5–0; Argentina 3–2; France 5–0; Czech Republic 3–2; United States 3–1; Croatia 3–2	First-round losers Japan; Kazakhstan; Switzerland; Poland; Canada; Germany; Australia; Belgium		

=== March ===
Week	Tournament	Champions	Runners-up	Semifinalists	Quarterfinalists
7 Mar; 14 Mar	Indian Wells Masters; Indian Wells, United States; ATP World Tour Masters 1000; Hard – $6,134,605 – 96S/32D; Singles – Doubles	(Serbia) Novak Djokovic; 6–2, 6–0	(Canada) Milos Raonic	(Spain) Rafael Nadal (Belgium) David Goffin	(France) Jo-Wilfried Tsonga (Japan) Kei Nishikori (Croatia) Marin Čilić (France) Gaël Monfils
7 Mar; 14 Mar	Indian Wells Masters; Indian Wells, United States; ATP World Tour Masters 1000; Hard – $6,134,605 – 96S/32D; Singles – Doubles	(France) Pierre-Hugues Herbert (France) Nicolas Mahut; 6–3, 7–6^{(7–5)}	(Canada) Vasek Pospisil (United States) Jack Sock	(Spain) Rafael Nadal (Belgium) David Goffin	(France) Jo-Wilfried Tsonga (Japan) Kei Nishikori (Croatia) Marin Čilić (France) Gaël Monfils
21 Mar; 28 Mar	Miami Open; Key Biscayne, United States; ATP World Tour Masters 1000; Hard – $6,134,605 – 96S/32D; Singles – Doubles	(Serbia) Novak Djokovic; 6–3, 6–3	(Japan) Kei Nishikori	(Belgium) David Goffin (Australia) Nick Kyrgios	(Czech Republic) Tomáš Berdych (France) Gilles Simon (Canada) Milos Raonic (France) Gaël Monfils
21 Mar; 28 Mar	Miami Open; Key Biscayne, United States; ATP World Tour Masters 1000; Hard – $6,134,605 – 96S/32D; Singles – Doubles	(France) Pierre-Hugues Herbert (France) Nicolas Mahut; 5–7, 6–1, [10–7]	(South Africa) Raven Klaasen (United States) Rajeev Ram	(Belgium) David Goffin (Australia) Nick Kyrgios	(Czech Republic) Tomáš Berdych (France) Gilles Simon (Canada) Milos Raonic (France) Gaël Monfils

=== April ===
Week	Tournament	Champions	Runners-up	Semifinalists	Quarterfinalists
4 Apr	U.S. Men's Clay Court Championships; Houston, United States; ATP World Tour 250; Clay (maroon) – $577,860 – 28S/16D; Singles – Doubles	(Argentina) Juan Mónaco; 3–6, 6–3, 7–5	(United States) Jack Sock	(United States) John Isner (Spain) Feliciano López	(South Korea) Chung Hyeon (Cyprus) Marcos Baghdatis (United States) Tim Smyczek (United States) Sam Querrey
4 Apr	U.S. Men's Clay Court Championships; Houston, United States; ATP World Tour 250; Clay (maroon) – $577,860 – 28S/16D; Singles – Doubles	(United States) Bob Bryan (United States) Mike Bryan; 4–6, 6–3, [10–8]	(Dominican Republic) Víctor Estrella Burgos (Mexico) Santiago González	(United States) John Isner (Spain) Feliciano López	(South Korea) Chung Hyeon (Cyprus) Marcos Baghdatis (United States) Tim Smyczek (United States) Sam Querrey
4 Apr	Grand Prix Hassan II; Marrakesh, Morocco; ATP World Tour 250; Clay (red) – €520,070 – 28S/16D; Singles – Doubles	(Argentina) Federico Delbonis; 6–2, 6–4	(Croatia) Borna Ćorić	(Czech Republic) Jiří Veselý (Spain) Albert Montañés	(Spain) Guillermo García López (France) Paul-Henri Mathieu (Spain) Pablo Carreño Busta (Argentina) Facundo Bagnis
4 Apr	Grand Prix Hassan II; Marrakesh, Morocco; ATP World Tour 250; Clay (red) – €520,070 – 28S/16D; Singles – Doubles	(Argentina) Guillermo Durán (Argentina) Máximo González; 6–2, 3–6, [10–6]	(Croatia) Marin Draganja (Pakistan) Aisam-ul-Haq Qureshi	(Czech Republic) Jiří Veselý (Spain) Albert Montañés	(Spain) Guillermo García López (France) Paul-Henri Mathieu (Spain) Pablo Carreño Busta (Argentina) Facundo Bagnis
11 Apr	Monte-Carlo Masters; Roquebrune-Cap-Martin, France; ATP World Tour Masters 1000; Clay (red) – €3,748,925 – 56S/28Q/24D; Singles – Doubles	(Spain) Rafael Nadal; 7–5, 5–7, 6–0	(France) Gaël Monfils	(France) Jo-Wilfried Tsonga (United Kingdom) Andy Murray	(Spain) Marcel Granollers (Switzerland) Roger Federer (Switzerland) Stan Wawrinka (Canada) Milos Raonic
11 Apr	Monte-Carlo Masters; Roquebrune-Cap-Martin, France; ATP World Tour Masters 1000; Clay (red) – €3,748,925 – 56S/28Q/24D; Singles – Doubles	(France) Pierre-Hugues Herbert (France) Nicolas Mahut; 4–6, 6–0, [10–6]	(United Kingdom) Jamie Murray (Brazil) Bruno Soares	(France) Jo-Wilfried Tsonga (United Kingdom) Andy Murray	(Spain) Marcel Granollers (Switzerland) Roger Federer (Switzerland) Stan Wawrinka (Canada) Milos Raonic
18 Apr	Barcelona Open; Barcelona, Spain; ATP World Tour 500; Clay (red) – €2,428,355 – 48S/16D; Singles – Doubles	(Spain) Rafael Nadal; 6–4, 7–5	(Japan) Kei Nishikori	(Germany) Philipp Kohlschreiber (France) Benoît Paire	(Italy) Fabio Fognini (Russia) Andrey Kuznetsov (Tunisia) Malek Jaziri (Ukraine) Alexandr Dolgopolov
18 Apr	Barcelona Open; Barcelona, Spain; ATP World Tour 500; Clay (red) – €2,428,355 – 48S/16D; Singles – Doubles	(United States) Bob Bryan (United States) Mike Bryan; 7–5, 7–5	(Uruguay) Pablo Cuevas (Spain) Marcel Granollers	(Germany) Philipp Kohlschreiber (France) Benoît Paire	(Italy) Fabio Fognini (Russia) Andrey Kuznetsov (Tunisia) Malek Jaziri (Ukraine) Alexandr Dolgopolov
18 Apr	Bucharest Open; Bucharest, Romania; ATP World Tour 250; Clay (red) – €520,070 – 28S/16D; Singles – Doubles	(Spain) Fernando Verdasco; 6–3, 6–2	(France) Lucas Pouille	(Spain) Guillermo García López (Argentina) Federico Delbonis	(Netherlands) Robin Haase (Argentina) Guido Pella (Italy) Marco Cecchinato (Italy) Paolo Lorenzi
18 Apr	Bucharest Open; Bucharest, Romania; ATP World Tour 250; Clay (red) – €520,070 – 28S/16D; Singles – Doubles	(Romania) Florin Mergea (Romania) Horia Tecău; 7–5, 6–4	(Australia) Chris Guccione (Brazil) André Sá	(Spain) Guillermo García López (Argentina) Federico Delbonis	(Netherlands) Robin Haase (Argentina) Guido Pella (Italy) Marco Cecchinato (Italy) Paolo Lorenzi
25 Apr	Estoril Open; Cascais, Portugal; ATP World Tour 250; Clay (red) – €520,070 – 28S/16D; Singles – Doubles	(Spain) Nicolás Almagro; 6–7^{(6–8)}, 7–6^{(7–5)}, 6–3	(Spain) Pablo Carreño Busta	(France) Benoît Paire (Australia) Nick Kyrgios	(France) Gilles Simon (Spain) Guillermo García López (Argentina) Leonardo Mayer (Croatia) Borna Ćorić
25 Apr	Estoril Open; Cascais, Portugal; ATP World Tour 250; Clay (red) – €520,070 – 28S/16D; Singles – Doubles	(United States) Eric Butorac (United States) Scott Lipsky; 6–4, 3–6, [10–8]	(Poland) Łukasz Kubot (Poland) Marcin Matkowski	(France) Benoît Paire (Australia) Nick Kyrgios	(France) Gilles Simon (Spain) Guillermo García López (Argentina) Leonardo Mayer (Croatia) Borna Ćorić
25 Apr	Bavarian Championships; Munich, Germany; ATP World Tour 250; Clay (red) – €520,070 – 28S/16D; Singles – Doubles	(Germany) Philipp Kohlschreiber; 7–6^{(9–7)}, 4–6, 7–6^{(7–4)}	(Austria) Dominic Thiem	(Germany) Alexander Zverev (Italy) Fabio Fognini	(Belgium) David Goffin (Croatia) Ivan Dodig (Argentina) Juan Martín del Potro (Slovakia) Jozef Kovalík
25 Apr	Bavarian Championships; Munich, Germany; ATP World Tour 250; Clay (red) – €520,070 – 28S/16D; Singles – Doubles	(Finland) Henri Kontinen (Australia) John Peers; 6–3, 3–6, [10–7]	(Colombia) Juan Sebastián Cabal (Colombia) Robert Farah	(Germany) Alexander Zverev (Italy) Fabio Fognini	(Belgium) David Goffin (Croatia) Ivan Dodig (Argentina) Juan Martín del Potro (Slovakia) Jozef Kovalík
25 Apr	Istanbul Open; Istanbul, Turkey; ATP World Tour 250; Clay (red) – €483,080 – 28S/16D; Singles – Doubles	(Argentina) Diego Schwartzman; 6–7^{(5–7)}, 7–6^{(7–4)}, 6–0	(Bulgaria) Grigor Dimitrov	(Argentina) Federico Delbonis (Croatia) Ivo Karlović	(Bosnia and Herzegovina) Damir Džumhur (Spain) Albert Ramos Viñolas (Spain) Marcel Granollers (Czech Republic) Jiří Veselý
25 Apr	Istanbul Open; Istanbul, Turkey; ATP World Tour 250; Clay (red) – €483,080 – 28S/16D; Singles – Doubles	(Italy) Flavio Cipolla (Israel) Dudi Sela; 6–3, 5–7, [10–7]	(Argentina) Andrés Molteni (Argentina) Diego Schwartzman	(Argentina) Federico Delbonis (Croatia) Ivo Karlović	(Bosnia and Herzegovina) Damir Džumhur (Spain) Albert Ramos Viñolas (Spain) Marcel Granollers (Czech Republic) Jiří Veselý

=== May ===
Week	Tournament	Champions	Runners-up	Semifinalists	Quarterfinalists
2 May	Madrid Open; Madrid, Spain; ATP World Tour Masters 1000; Clay (red) – €4,771,360 – 56S/28Q/24D; Singles – Doubles	(Serbia) Novak Djokovic; 6–2, 3–6, 6–3	(United Kingdom) Andy Murray	(Japan) Kei Nishikori (Spain) Rafael Nadal	(Canada) Milos Raonic (Australia) Nick Kyrgios (Portugal) João Sousa (Czech Republic) Tomáš Berdych
2 May	Madrid Open; Madrid, Spain; ATP World Tour Masters 1000; Clay (red) – €4,771,360 – 56S/28Q/24D; Singles – Doubles	(Netherlands) Jean-Julien Rojer (Romania) Horia Tecău; 6–4, 7–6^{(7–5)}	(India) Rohan Bopanna (Romania) Florin Mergea	(Japan) Kei Nishikori (Spain) Rafael Nadal	(Canada) Milos Raonic (Australia) Nick Kyrgios (Portugal) João Sousa (Czech Republic) Tomáš Berdych
9 May	Italian Open; Rome, Italy; ATP World Tour Masters 1000; Clay (red) – €3,748,925 – 56S/28Q/24D; Singles – Doubles	(United Kingdom) Andy Murray; 6–3, 6–3	(Serbia) Novak Djokovic	(Japan) Kei Nishikori (France) Lucas Pouille	(Spain) Rafael Nadal (Austria) Dominic Thiem (Argentina) Juan Mónaco (Belgium) David Goffin
9 May	Italian Open; Rome, Italy; ATP World Tour Masters 1000; Clay (red) – €3,748,925 – 56S/28Q/24D; Singles – Doubles	(United States) Bob Bryan (United States) Mike Bryan; 2–6, 6–3, [10–7]	(Canada) Vasek Pospisil (United States) Jack Sock	(Japan) Kei Nishikori (France) Lucas Pouille	(Spain) Rafael Nadal (Austria) Dominic Thiem (Argentina) Juan Mónaco (Belgium) David Goffin
16 May	Geneva Open; Geneva, Switzerland; ATP World Tour 250; Clay (red) – €556,195 – 28S/16D; Singles – Doubles	(Switzerland) Stan Wawrinka; 6–4, 7–6^{(13–11)}	(Croatia) Marin Čilić	(Czech Republic) Lukáš Rosol (Spain) David Ferrer	(Spain) Pablo Carreño Busta (Russia) Andrey Kuznetsov (Argentina) Federico Delbonis (Spain) Guillermo García López
16 May	Geneva Open; Geneva, Switzerland; ATP World Tour 250; Clay (red) – €556,195 – 28S/16D; Singles – Doubles	(United States) Steve Johnson (United States) Sam Querrey; 6–4, 6–1	(South Africa) Raven Klaasen (United States) Rajeev Ram	(Czech Republic) Lukáš Rosol (Spain) David Ferrer	(Spain) Pablo Carreño Busta (Russia) Andrey Kuznetsov (Argentina) Federico Delbonis (Spain) Guillermo García López
16 May	Open de Nice Côte d'Azur; Nice, France; ATP World Tour 250; Clay (red) – €520,070 – 28S/16D; Singles – Doubles	(Austria) Dominic Thiem; 6–4, 3–6, 6–0	(Germany) Alexander Zverev	(France) Adrian Mannarino (Portugal) João Sousa	(Italy) Andreas Seppi (Argentina) Guido Pella (South Africa) Kevin Anderson (France) Gilles Simon
16 May	Open de Nice Côte d'Azur; Nice, France; ATP World Tour 250; Clay (red) – €520,070 – 28S/16D; Singles – Doubles	(Colombia) Juan Sebastián Cabal (Colombia) Robert Farah; 4–6, 6–4, [10–8]	(Croatia) Mate Pavić (New Zealand) Michael Venus	(France) Adrian Mannarino (Portugal) João Sousa	(Italy) Andreas Seppi (Argentina) Guido Pella (South Africa) Kevin Anderson (France) Gilles Simon
23 May; 30 May	French Open; Paris, France; Grand Slam; Clay (red) – €14,880,000; 128S/64D/32X; Singles – Doubles – Mixed	(Serbia) Novak Djokovic; 3–6, 6–1, 6–2, 6–4	(United Kingdom) Andy Murray	(Austria) Dominic Thiem (Switzerland) Stan Wawrinka	(Czech Republic) Tomáš Berdych (Belgium) David Goffin (Spain) Albert Ramos Viñolas (France) Richard Gasquet
23 May; 30 May	French Open; Paris, France; Grand Slam; Clay (red) – €14,880,000; 128S/64D/32X; Singles – Doubles – Mixed	(Spain) Feliciano López (Spain) Marc López; 6–4, 6–7^{(6–8)}, 6–3	(United States) Bob Bryan (United States) Mike Bryan	(Austria) Dominic Thiem (Switzerland) Stan Wawrinka	(Czech Republic) Tomáš Berdych (Belgium) David Goffin (Spain) Albert Ramos Viñolas (France) Richard Gasquet
23 May; 30 May	French Open; Paris, France; Grand Slam; Clay (red) – €14,880,000; 128S/64D/32X; Singles – Doubles – Mixed	(Switzerland) Martina Hingis (India) Leander Paes; 4–6, 6–4, [10–8]	(India) Sania Mirza (Croatia) Ivan Dodig	(Austria) Dominic Thiem (Switzerland) Stan Wawrinka	(Czech Republic) Tomáš Berdych (Belgium) David Goffin (Spain) Albert Ramos Viñolas (France) Richard Gasquet

=== June ===
Week	Tournament	Champions	Runners-up	Semifinalists	Quarterfinalists
6 Jun	MercedesCup; Stuttgart, Germany; ATP World Tour 250; Grass – €606,520 – 28S/16D; Singles – Doubles	(Austria) Dominic Thiem; 6–7^{(2–7)}, 6–4, 6–4	(Germany) Philipp Kohlschreiber	(Switzerland) Roger Federer (Argentina) Juan Martín del Potro	(Germany) Florian Mayer (Russia) Mikhail Youzhny (France) Gilles Simon (Czech Republic) Radek Štěpánek
6 Jun	MercedesCup; Stuttgart, Germany; ATP World Tour 250; Grass – €606,520 – 28S/16D; Singles – Doubles	(New Zealand) Marcus Daniell (New Zealand) Artem Sitak; 6–7^{(4–7)}, 6–4, [10–8]	(Austria) Oliver Marach (France) Fabrice Martin	(Switzerland) Roger Federer (Argentina) Juan Martín del Potro	(Germany) Florian Mayer (Russia) Mikhail Youzhny (France) Gilles Simon (Czech Republic) Radek Štěpánek
6 Jun	Rosmalen Grass Court Championships 's-Hertogenbosch, Netherlands; ATP World Tour 250; Grass – €635,645 – 28S/16D; Singles – Doubles	(France) Nicolas Mahut; 6–4, 6–4	(Luxembourg) Gilles Müller	(Croatia) Ivo Karlović (United States) Sam Querrey	(Spain) David Ferrer (France) Adrian Mannarino (United States) Stefan Kozlov (Australia) Bernard Tomic
6 Jun	Rosmalen Grass Court Championships 's-Hertogenbosch, Netherlands; ATP World Tour 250; Grass – €635,645 – 28S/16D; Singles – Doubles	(Croatia) Mate Pavić (New Zealand) Michael Venus; 3–6, 6–3, [11–9]	(United Kingdom) Dominic Inglot (South Africa) Raven Klaasen	(Croatia) Ivo Karlović (United States) Sam Querrey	(Spain) David Ferrer (France) Adrian Mannarino (United States) Stefan Kozlov (Australia) Bernard Tomic
13 Jun	Queen's Club Championships; London, United Kingdom; ATP World Tour 500; Grass – €1,928,610 – 32S/16D; Singles – Doubles	(United Kingdom) Andy Murray; 6–7^{(5–7)}, 6–4, 6–3	(Canada) Milos Raonic	(Croatia) Marin Čilić (Australia) Bernard Tomic	(United Kingdom) Kyle Edmund (United States) Steve Johnson (Spain) Roberto Bautista Agut (Luxembourg) Gilles Müller
13 Jun	Queen's Club Championships; London, United Kingdom; ATP World Tour 500; Grass – €1,928,610 – 32S/16D; Singles – Doubles	(France) Pierre-Hugues Herbert (France) Nicolas Mahut; 6–3, 7–6^{(7–5)}	(Australia) Chris Guccione (Brazil) André Sá	(Croatia) Marin Čilić (Australia) Bernard Tomic	(United Kingdom) Kyle Edmund (United States) Steve Johnson (Spain) Roberto Bautista Agut (Luxembourg) Gilles Müller
13 Jun	Halle Open; Halle, Germany; ATP World Tour 500; Grass – €1,826,275 – 32S/16D; Singles – Doubles	(Germany) Florian Mayer; 6–2, 5–7, 6–3	(Germany) Alexander Zverev	(Switzerland) Roger Federer (Austria) Dominic Thiem	(Belgium) David Goffin (Cyprus) Marcos Baghdatis (Germany) Philipp Kohlschreiber (Italy) Andreas Seppi
13 Jun	Halle Open; Halle, Germany; ATP World Tour 500; Grass – €1,826,275 – 32S/16D; Singles – Doubles	(South Africa) Raven Klaasen (United States) Rajeev Ram; 7–6^{(7–5)}, 6–2	(Poland) Łukasz Kubot (Austria) Alexander Peya	(Switzerland) Roger Federer (Austria) Dominic Thiem	(Belgium) David Goffin (Cyprus) Marcos Baghdatis (Germany) Philipp Kohlschreiber (Italy) Andreas Seppi
20 Jun	Nottingham Open; Nottingham, United Kingdom; ATP World Tour 250; Grass – €704,805 – 48S/16D; Singles – Doubles	(United States) Steve Johnson; 7–6^{(7–5)}, 7–5	(Uruguay) Pablo Cuevas	(Italy) Andreas Seppi (Luxembourg) Gilles Müller	(South Africa) Kevin Anderson (Israel) Dudi Sela (Ukraine) Alexandr Dolgopolov (Cyprus) Marcos Baghdatis
20 Jun	Nottingham Open; Nottingham, United Kingdom; ATP World Tour 250; Grass – €704,805 – 48S/16D; Singles – Doubles	(United Kingdom) Dominic Inglot (Canada) Daniel Nestor; 7–5, 7–6^{(7–4)}	(Croatia) Ivan Dodig (Brazil) Marcelo Melo	(Italy) Andreas Seppi (Luxembourg) Gilles Müller	(South Africa) Kevin Anderson (Israel) Dudi Sela (Ukraine) Alexandr Dolgopolov (Cyprus) Marcos Baghdatis
27 Jun; 4 Jul	Wimbledon; London, United Kingdom; Grand Slam; Grass – £13,163,000; 128S/64D/48X; Singles – Doubles – Mixed	(United Kingdom) Andy Murray; 6–4, 7–6^{(7–3)}, 7–6^{(7–2)}	(Canada) Milos Raonic	(Switzerland) Roger Federer (Czech Republic) Tomáš Berdych	(United States) Sam Querrey (Croatia) Marin Čilić (France) Lucas Pouille (France) Jo-Wilfried Tsonga
27 Jun; 4 Jul	Wimbledon; London, United Kingdom; Grand Slam; Grass – £13,163,000; 128S/64D/48X; Singles – Doubles – Mixed	(France) Pierre-Hugues Herbert (France) Nicolas Mahut; 6–4, 7–6^{(7–1)}, 6–3	(France) Julien Benneteau (France) Édouard Roger-Vasselin	(Switzerland) Roger Federer (Czech Republic) Tomáš Berdych	(United States) Sam Querrey (Croatia) Marin Čilić (France) Lucas Pouille (France) Jo-Wilfried Tsonga
27 Jun; 4 Jul	Wimbledon; London, United Kingdom; Grand Slam; Grass – £13,163,000; 128S/64D/48X; Singles – Doubles – Mixed	(United Kingdom) Heather Watson (Finland) Henri Kontinen; 7–6^{(7–5)}, 6–4	(Germany) Anna-Lena Grönefeld (Colombia) Robert Farah	(Switzerland) Roger Federer (Czech Republic) Tomáš Berdych	(United States) Sam Querrey (Croatia) Marin Čilić (France) Lucas Pouille (France) Jo-Wilfried Tsonga

=== July ===
Week	Tournament	Champions	Runners-up	Semifinalists	Quarterfinalists
11 Jul	Davis Cup Quarterfinals; Belgrade, Serbia – clay Pesaro, Italy – clay Třinec, Czech Republic – hard (i); Portland, United States – hard	Quarterfinals winners Great Britain 3–2; Argentina 3–1; France 3–1; Croatia 3–2	Quarterfinals losers Serbia; Italy; Czech Republic; United States		
11 Jul	German Open; Hamburg, Germany; ATP World Tour 500; Clay (red) – €1,514,495 – 32S/16D; Singles – Doubles	(Slovakia) Martin Kližan; 6–1, 6–4	(Uruguay) Pablo Cuevas	(Argentina) Renzo Olivo (France) Stéphane Robert	(Germany) Philipp Kohlschreiber (France) Paul-Henri Mathieu (Spain) Guillermo García López (Spain) Daniel Gimeno Traver
11 Jul	German Open; Hamburg, Germany; ATP World Tour 500; Clay (red) – €1,514,495 – 32S/16D; Singles – Doubles	(Finland) Henri Kontinen (Australia) John Peers; 7–5, 6–3	(Canada) Daniel Nestor (Pakistan) Aisam-ul-Haq Qureshi	(Argentina) Renzo Olivo (France) Stéphane Robert	(Germany) Philipp Kohlschreiber (France) Paul-Henri Mathieu (Spain) Guillermo García López (Spain) Daniel Gimeno Traver
11 Jul	Hall of Fame Tennis Championships; Newport, United States; ATP World Tour 250; Grass – $577,860 – 28S/16D; Singles – Doubles	(Croatia) Ivo Karlović; 6–7^{(2–7)}, 7–6^{(7–5)}, 7–6^{(14–12)}	(Luxembourg) Gilles Müller	(United States) Donald Young (Cyprus) Marcos Baghdatis	(United States) Steve Johnson (France) Adrian Mannarino (Israel) Dudi Sela (Switzerland) Marco Chiudinelli
11 Jul	Hall of Fame Tennis Championships; Newport, United States; ATP World Tour 250; Grass – $577,860 – 28S/16D; Singles – Doubles	(Australia) Sam Groth (Australia) Chris Guccione; 6–4, 6–3	(United Kingdom) Jonathan Marray (Canada) Adil Shamasdin	(United States) Donald Young (Cyprus) Marcos Baghdatis	(United States) Steve Johnson (France) Adrian Mannarino (Israel) Dudi Sela (Switzerland) Marco Chiudinelli
11 Jul	Swedish Open; Båstad, Sweden; ATP World Tour 250; Clay (red) – €520,070 – 28S/16D; Singles – Doubles	(Spain) Albert Ramos Viñolas; 6–3, 6–4	(Spain) Fernando Verdasco	(Spain) David Ferrer (Portugal) Gastão Elias	(Germany) Dustin Brown (Italy) Andrea Arnaboldi (Argentina) Facundo Bagnis (Portugal) João Sousa
11 Jul	Swedish Open; Båstad, Sweden; ATP World Tour 250; Clay (red) – €520,070 – 28S/16D; Singles – Doubles	(Spain) Marcel Granollers (Spain) David Marrero; 6–2, 6–3	(New Zealand) Marcus Daniell (Brazil) Marcelo Demoliner	(Spain) David Ferrer (Portugal) Gastão Elias	(Germany) Dustin Brown (Italy) Andrea Arnaboldi (Argentina) Facundo Bagnis (Portugal) João Sousa
18 Jul	Washington Open; Washington, D.C., United States; ATP World Tour 500; Hard – $1,877,705 – 48S/16D; Singles – Doubles	(France) Gaël Monfils; 5–7, 7–6^{(8–6)}, 6–4	(Croatia) Ivo Karlović	(United States) Steve Johnson (Germany) Alexander Zverev	(United States) John Isner (United States) Jack Sock (France) Benoît Paire (United States) Sam Querrey
18 Jul	Washington Open; Washington, D.C., United States; ATP World Tour 500; Hard – $1,877,705 – 48S/16D; Singles – Doubles	(Canada) Daniel Nestor (France) Édouard Roger-Vasselin; 7–6^{(7–3)}, 7–6^{(7–4)}	(Poland) Łukasz Kubot (Austria) Alexander Peya	(United States) Steve Johnson (Germany) Alexander Zverev	(United States) John Isner (United States) Jack Sock (France) Benoît Paire (United States) Sam Querrey
18 Jul	Swiss Open; Gstaad, Switzerland; ATP World Tour 250; Clay (red) – €520,070 – 28S/16D; Singles – Doubles	(Spain) Feliciano López; 6–4, 7–5	(Netherlands) Robin Haase	(Germany) Dustin Brown (France) Paul-Henri Mathieu	(Sweden) Elias Ymer (Russia) Mikhail Youzhny (Spain) Albert Ramos Viñolas (Brazil) Thiago Monteiro
18 Jul	Swiss Open; Gstaad, Switzerland; ATP World Tour 250; Clay (red) – €520,070 – 28S/16D; Singles – Doubles	(Chile) Julio Peralta (Argentina) Horacio Zeballos; 7–6^{(7–2)}, 6–2	(Croatia) Mate Pavić (New Zealand) Michael Venus	(Germany) Dustin Brown (France) Paul-Henri Mathieu	(Sweden) Elias Ymer (Russia) Mikhail Youzhny (Spain) Albert Ramos Viñolas (Brazil) Thiago Monteiro
18 Jul	Austrian Open Kitzbühel; Kitzbühel, Austria; ATP World Tour 250; Clay (red) – €520,070 – 28S/16D; Singles – Doubles	(Italy) Paolo Lorenzi; 6–3, 6–4	(Georgia (country)) Nikoloz Basilashvili	(Austria) Gerald Melzer (Serbia) Dušan Lajović	(Austria) Jürgen Melzer (Germany) Jan-Lennard Struff (Czech Republic) Adam Pavlásek (Russia) Karen Khachanov
18 Jul	Austrian Open Kitzbühel; Kitzbühel, Austria; ATP World Tour 250; Clay (red) – €520,070 – 28S/16D; Singles – Doubles	(Netherlands) Wesley Koolhof (Netherlands) Matwé Middelkoop; 2–6, 6–3, [11–9]	(Austria) Dennis Novak (Austria) Dominic Thiem	(Austria) Gerald Melzer (Serbia) Dušan Lajović	(Austria) Jürgen Melzer (Germany) Jan-Lennard Struff (Czech Republic) Adam Pavlásek (Russia) Karen Khachanov
18 Jul	Croatia Open; Umag, Croatia; ATP World Tour 250; Clay (red) – €520,070 – 28S/16D; Singles – Doubles	(Italy) Fabio Fognini; 6–4, 6–1	(Slovakia) Andrej Martin	(Portugal) Gastão Elias (Argentina) Carlos Berlocq	(Spain) Pablo Carreño Busta (Bosnia and Herzegovina) Damir Džumhur (France) Jérémy Chardy (Portugal) João Sousa
18 Jul	Croatia Open; Umag, Croatia; ATP World Tour 250; Clay (red) – €520,070 – 28S/16D; Singles – Doubles	(Slovakia) Martin Kližan (Spain) David Marrero; 6–4, 6–2	(Croatia) Nikola Mektić (Croatia) Antonio Šančić	(Portugal) Gastão Elias (Argentina) Carlos Berlocq	(Spain) Pablo Carreño Busta (Bosnia and Herzegovina) Damir Džumhur (France) Jérémy Chardy (Portugal) João Sousa
25 Jul	Canadian Open; Toronto, Canada; ATP World Tour Masters 1000; Hard – $4,089,740 – 56S/24D; Singles – Doubles	(Serbia) Novak Djokovic; 6–3, 7–5	(Japan) Kei Nishikori	(France) Gaël Monfils (Switzerland) Stan Wawrinka	(Czech Republic) Tomáš Berdych (Canada) Milos Raonic (Bulgaria) Grigor Dimitrov (South Africa) Kevin Anderson
25 Jul	Canadian Open; Toronto, Canada; ATP World Tour Masters 1000; Hard – $4,089,740 – 56S/24D; Singles – Doubles	(Croatia) Ivan Dodig (Brazil) Marcelo Melo; 6–4, 6–4	(United Kingdom) Jamie Murray (Brazil) Bruno Soares	(France) Gaël Monfils (Switzerland) Stan Wawrinka	(Czech Republic) Tomáš Berdych (Canada) Milos Raonic (Bulgaria) Grigor Dimitrov (South Africa) Kevin Anderson

=== August ===
Week	Tournament	Champions	Runners-up	Semifinalists	Quarterfinalists
1 Aug	Atlanta Tennis Championships; Atlanta, United States; ATP World Tour 250; Hard – $693,425 – 28S/16D; Singles – Doubles	(Australia) Nick Kyrgios; 7–6^{(7–3)}, 7–6^{(7–4)}	(United States) John Isner	(United States) Reilly Opelka (Japan) Yoshihito Nishioka	(United States) Taylor Fritz (United States) Donald Young (Argentina) Horacio Zeballos (Spain) Fernando Verdasco
1 Aug	Atlanta Tennis Championships; Atlanta, United States; ATP World Tour 250; Hard – $693,425 – 28S/16D; Singles – Doubles	(Argentina) Andrés Molteni (Argentina) Horacio Zeballos; 7–6^{(7–2)}, 6–4	(Sweden) Johan Brunström (Sweden) Andreas Siljeström	(United States) Reilly Opelka (Japan) Yoshihito Nishioka	(United States) Taylor Fritz (United States) Donald Young (Argentina) Horacio Zeballos (Spain) Fernando Verdasco
8 Aug	Summer Olympics; Rio de Janeiro, Brazil; Olympic Games; Hard – 64S/32D/16X; Singles – Doubles – Mixed	Gold	Silver	Bronze	Fourth place
8 Aug	Summer Olympics; Rio de Janeiro, Brazil; Olympic Games; Hard – 64S/32D/16X; Singles – Doubles – Mixed	(United Kingdom) Andy Murray; 7–5, 4–6, 6–2, 7–5	(Argentina) Juan Martín del Potro	(Japan) Kei Nishikori; 6–2, 6–7^{(1–7)}, 6–3	(Spain) Rafael Nadal
8 Aug	Summer Olympics; Rio de Janeiro, Brazil; Olympic Games; Hard – 64S/32D/16X; Singles – Doubles – Mixed	(Spain) Marc López (Spain) Rafael Nadal; 6–2, 3–6, 6–4	(Romania) Florin Mergea (Romania) Horia Tecău	(United States) Steve Johnson (United States) Jack Sock; 6–2, 6–4	(Canada) Daniel Nestor (Canada) Vasek Pospisil
8 Aug	Summer Olympics; Rio de Janeiro, Brazil; Olympic Games; Hard – 64S/32D/16X; Singles – Doubles – Mixed	(United States) Bethanie Mattek-Sands (United States) Jack Sock; 6–7^{(3–7)}, 6–1, [10–7]	(United States) Venus Williams (United States) Rajeev Ram	(Czech Republic) Lucie Hradecká (Czech Republic) Radek Štěpánek; 6–1, 7–5	(India) Sania Mirza (India) Rohan Bopanna
8 Aug	Los Cabos Open; Cabo San Lucas, Mexico; ATP World Tour 250; Hard – $808,995 – 28S/16D; Singles – Doubles	(Croatia) Ivo Karlović; 7–6^{(7–5)}, 6–2	(Spain) Feliciano López	(Spain) Pablo Carreño Busta (Serbia) Dušan Lajović	(France) Julien Benneteau (Colombia) Santiago Giraldo (Spain) Marcel Granollers (Spain) Nicolás Almagro
8 Aug	Los Cabos Open; Cabo San Lucas, Mexico; ATP World Tour 250; Hard – $808,995 – 28S/16D; Singles – Doubles	(India) Purav Raja (India) Divij Sharan; 7–6^{(7–4)}, 7–6^{(7–3)}	(Israel) Jonathan Erlich (United Kingdom) Ken Skupski	(Spain) Pablo Carreño Busta (Serbia) Dušan Lajović	(France) Julien Benneteau (Colombia) Santiago Giraldo (Spain) Marcel Granollers (Spain) Nicolás Almagro
15 Aug	Cincinnati Masters; Mason, United States; ATP World Tour Masters 1000; Hard – $4,362,385 – 56S/24D; Singles – Doubles	(Croatia) Marin Čilić; 6–4, 7–5	(United Kingdom) Andy Murray	(Canada) Milos Raonic (Bulgaria) Grigor Dimitrov	(Australia) Bernard Tomic (Austria) Dominic Thiem (Croatia) Borna Ćorić (United States) Steve Johnson
15 Aug	Cincinnati Masters; Mason, United States; ATP World Tour Masters 1000; Hard – $4,362,385 – 56S/24D; Singles – Doubles	(Croatia) Ivan Dodig (Brazil) Marcelo Melo; 7–6^{(7–5)}, 6–7^{(5–7)}, [10–6]	(Netherlands) Jean-Julien Rojer (Romania) Horia Tecău	(Canada) Milos Raonic (Bulgaria) Grigor Dimitrov	(Australia) Bernard Tomic (Austria) Dominic Thiem (Croatia) Borna Ćorić (United States) Steve Johnson
22 Aug	Winston-Salem Open; Winston-Salem, United States; ATP World Tour 250; Hard – $720,940 – 48S/16D; Singles – Doubles	(Spain) Pablo Carreño Busta; 6–7^{(6–8)}, 7–6^{(7–1)}, 6–4	(Spain) Roberto Bautista Agut	(Australia) John Millman (Serbia) Viktor Troicki	(France) Richard Gasquet (Russia) Andrey Kuznetsov (Spain) Fernando Verdasco (Chinese Taipei) Lu Yen-hsun
22 Aug	Winston-Salem Open; Winston-Salem, United States; ATP World Tour 250; Hard – $720,940 – 48S/16D; Singles – Doubles	(Spain) Guillermo García López (Finland) Henri Kontinen; 4–6, 7–6^{(8–6)}, [10–8]	(Germany) Andre Begemann (India) Leander Paes	(Australia) John Millman (Serbia) Viktor Troicki	(France) Richard Gasquet (Russia) Andrey Kuznetsov (Spain) Fernando Verdasco (Chinese Taipei) Lu Yen-hsun
29 Aug; 5 Sep	US Open; New York City, United States; Grand Slam; Hard – $21,862,700; 128S/64D/32X; Singles – Doubles – Mixed	(Switzerland) Stan Wawrinka; 6–7^{(1–7)}, 6–4, 7–5, 6–3	(Serbia) Novak Djokovic	(France) Gaël Monfils (Japan) Kei Nishikori	(France) Jo-Wilfried Tsonga (France) Lucas Pouille (Argentina) Juan Martín del Potro (United Kingdom) Andy Murray
29 Aug; 5 Sep	US Open; New York City, United States; Grand Slam; Hard – $21,862,700; 128S/64D/32X; Singles – Doubles – Mixed	(United Kingdom) Jamie Murray (Brazil) Bruno Soares; 6–2, 6–3	(Spain) Pablo Carreño Busta (Spain) Guillermo García López	(France) Gaël Monfils (Japan) Kei Nishikori	(France) Jo-Wilfried Tsonga (France) Lucas Pouille (Argentina) Juan Martín del Potro (United Kingdom) Andy Murray
29 Aug; 5 Sep	US Open; New York City, United States; Grand Slam; Hard – $21,862,700; 128S/64D/32X; Singles – Doubles – Mixed	(Germany) Laura Siegemund (Croatia) Mate Pavić; 6–4, 6–4	(United States) CoCo Vandeweghe (United States) Rajeev Ram	(France) Gaël Monfils (Japan) Kei Nishikori	(France) Jo-Wilfried Tsonga (France) Lucas Pouille (Argentina) Juan Martín del Potro (United Kingdom) Andy Murray

=== September ===
Week	Tournament	Champions	Runners-up	Semifinalists	Quarterfinalists
12 Sep	Davis Cup Semifinals; Glasgow, United Kingdom – hard (i); Zadar, Croatia – hard (i)	Semifinal winners Argentina 3–2; Croatia 3–2	Semifinal losers Great Britain; France		
19 Sep	St. Petersburg Open; St. Petersburg, Russia; ATP World Tour 250; Hard (i) – $986,380 – 28S/16D; Singles – Doubles	(Germany) Alexander Zverev; 6–2, 3–6, 7–5	(Switzerland) Stan Wawrinka	(Spain) Roberto Bautista Agut (Czech Republic) Tomáš Berdych	(Serbia) Viktor Troicki (Portugal) João Sousa (Italy) Paolo Lorenzi (Russia) Mikhail Youzhny
19 Sep	St. Petersburg Open; St. Petersburg, Russia; ATP World Tour 250; Hard (i) – $986,380 – 28S/16D; Singles – Doubles	(United Kingdom) Dominic Inglot (Finland) Henri Kontinen; 4–6, 6–3, [12–10]	(Germany) Andre Begemann (India) Leander Paes	(Spain) Roberto Bautista Agut (Czech Republic) Tomáš Berdych	(Serbia) Viktor Troicki (Portugal) João Sousa (Italy) Paolo Lorenzi (Russia) Mikhail Youzhny
19 Sep	Moselle Open; Metz, France; ATP World Tour 250; Hard (i) – €520,070 – 28S/16D; Singles – Doubles	(France) Lucas Pouille; 7–6^{(7–5)}, 6–2	(Austria) Dominic Thiem	(France) Gilles Simon (Belgium) David Goffin	(Luxembourg) Gilles Müller (Tunisia) Malek Jaziri (France) Julien Benneteau (France) Nicolas Mahut
19 Sep	Moselle Open; Metz, France; ATP World Tour 250; Hard (i) – €520,070 – 28S/16D; Singles – Doubles	(Chile) Julio Peralta (Argentina) Horacio Zeballos; 6–3, 7–6^{(7–4)}	(Croatia) Mate Pavić (New Zealand) Michael Venus	(France) Gilles Simon (Belgium) David Goffin	(Luxembourg) Gilles Müller (Tunisia) Malek Jaziri (France) Julien Benneteau (France) Nicolas Mahut
26 Sep	Chengdu Open; Chengdu, China; ATP World Tour 250; Hard – $947,735 – 28S/16D; Singles – Doubles	(Russia) Karen Khachanov; 6–7^{(4–7)}, 7–6^{(7–3)}, 6–3	(Spain) Albert Ramos Viñolas	(Bulgaria) Grigor Dimitrov (Serbia) Viktor Troicki	(Austria) Dominic Thiem (Argentina) Diego Schwartzman (Spain) Feliciano López (South Africa) Kevin Anderson
26 Sep	Chengdu Open; Chengdu, China; ATP World Tour 250; Hard – $947,735 – 28S/16D; Singles – Doubles	(South Africa) Raven Klaasen (United States) Rajeev Ram; 7–6^{(7–2)}, 7–5	(Spain) Pablo Carreño Busta (Poland) Mariusz Fyrstenberg	(Bulgaria) Grigor Dimitrov (Serbia) Viktor Troicki	(Austria) Dominic Thiem (Argentina) Diego Schwartzman (Spain) Feliciano López (South Africa) Kevin Anderson
26 Sep	Shenzhen Open; Shenzhen, China; ATP World Tour 250; Hard – $704,140 – 28S/16D; Singles – Doubles	(Czech Republic) Tomáš Berdych; 7–6^{(7–5)}, 6–7^{(2–7)}, 6–3	(France) Richard Gasquet	(Brazil) Thomaz Bellucci (Serbia) Janko Tipsarević	(Czech Republic) Jiří Veselý (Australia) Bernard Tomic (Germany) Mischa Zverev (Tunisia) Malek Jaziri
26 Sep	Shenzhen Open; Shenzhen, China; ATP World Tour 250; Hard – $704,140 – 28S/16D; Singles – Doubles	(Italy) Fabio Fognini (Sweden) Robert Lindstedt; 7–6^{(7–4)}, 6–3	(Austria) Oliver Marach (France) Fabrice Martin	(Brazil) Thomaz Bellucci (Serbia) Janko Tipsarević	(Czech Republic) Jiří Veselý (Australia) Bernard Tomic (Germany) Mischa Zverev (Tunisia) Malek Jaziri

=== October ===
Week	Tournament	Champions	Runners-up	Semifinalists	Quarterfinalists
3 Oct	China Open; Beijing, China; ATP World Tour 500; Hard – $4,164,780 – 32S/16D; Singles – Doubles	(United Kingdom) Andy Murray; 6–4, 7–6^{(7–2)}	(Bulgaria) Grigor Dimitrov	(Spain) David Ferrer (Canada) Milos Raonic	(United Kingdom) Kyle Edmund (Germany) Alexander Zverev (Spain) Pablo Carreño Busta (Spain) Rafael Nadal
3 Oct	China Open; Beijing, China; ATP World Tour 500; Hard – $4,164,780 – 32S/16D; Singles – Doubles	(Spain) Pablo Carreño Busta (Spain) Rafael Nadal; 6–7^{(6–8)}, 6–2, [10–8]	(United States) Jack Sock (Australia) Bernard Tomic	(Spain) David Ferrer (Canada) Milos Raonic	(United Kingdom) Kyle Edmund (Germany) Alexander Zverev (Spain) Pablo Carreño Busta (Spain) Rafael Nadal
3 Oct	Japan Open; Tokyo, Japan; ATP World Tour 500; Hard – $1,506,835 – 32S/16D; Singles – Doubles	(Australia) Nick Kyrgios; 4–6, 6–3, 7–5	(Belgium) David Goffin	(Croatia) Marin Čilić (France) Gaël Monfils	(Portugal) João Sousa (Argentina) Juan Mónaco (Luxembourg) Gilles Müller (Croatia) Ivo Karlović
3 Oct	Japan Open; Tokyo, Japan; ATP World Tour 500; Hard – $1,506,835 – 32S/16D; Singles – Doubles	(Spain) Marcel Granollers (Poland) Marcin Matkowski; 6–2, 7–6^{(7–4)}	(South Africa) Raven Klaasen (United States) Rajeev Ram	(Croatia) Marin Čilić (France) Gaël Monfils	(Portugal) João Sousa (Argentina) Juan Mónaco (Luxembourg) Gilles Müller (Croatia) Ivo Karlović
10 Oct	Shanghai Masters; Shanghai, China; ATP World Tour Masters 1000; Hard – $5,452,985 – 56S/28Q/24D; Singles – Doubles	(United Kingdom) Andy Murray; 7–6^{(7–1)}, 6–1	(Spain) Roberto Bautista Agut	(Serbia) Novak Djokovic (France) Gilles Simon	(Germany) Mischa Zverev (France) Jo-Wilfried Tsonga (United States) Jack Sock (Belgium) David Goffin
10 Oct	Shanghai Masters; Shanghai, China; ATP World Tour Masters 1000; Hard – $5,452,985 – 56S/28Q/24D; Singles – Doubles	(United States) John Isner (United States) Jack Sock; 6–4, 6–4	(Finland) Henri Kontinen (Australia) John Peers	(Serbia) Novak Djokovic (France) Gilles Simon	(Germany) Mischa Zverev (France) Jo-Wilfried Tsonga (United States) Jack Sock (Belgium) David Goffin
17 Oct	Kremlin Cup; Moscow, Russia; ATP World Tour 250; Hard (i) – $792,645 – 28S/16D; Singles – Doubles	(Spain) Pablo Carreño Busta; 4–6, 6–3, 6–2	(Italy) Fabio Fognini	(France) Stéphane Robert (Germany) Philipp Kohlschreiber	(Russia) Alexander Bublik (Russia) Daniil Medvedev (Brazil) Thomaz Bellucci (Spain) Albert Ramos Viñolas
17 Oct	Kremlin Cup; Moscow, Russia; ATP World Tour 250; Hard (i) – $792,645 – 28S/16D; Singles – Doubles	(Colombia) Juan Sebastián Cabal (Colombia) Robert Farah; 7–5, 4–6, [10–5]	(Austria) Julian Knowle (Austria) Jürgen Melzer	(France) Stéphane Robert (Germany) Philipp Kohlschreiber	(Russia) Alexander Bublik (Russia) Daniil Medvedev (Brazil) Thomaz Bellucci (Spain) Albert Ramos Viñolas
17 Oct	European Open; Antwerp, Belgium; ATP World Tour 250; Hard (i) – €635,645 – 28S/16D; Singles – Doubles	(France) Richard Gasquet; 7–6^{(7–4)}, 6–1	(Argentina) Diego Schwartzman	(Belgium) David Goffin (United Kingdom) Kyle Edmund	(Romania) Marius Copil (Uruguay) Pablo Cuevas (Germany) Jan-Lennard Struff (Italy) Andreas Seppi
17 Oct	European Open; Antwerp, Belgium; ATP World Tour 250; Hard (i) – €635,645 – 28S/16D; Singles – Doubles	(Canada) Daniel Nestor (France) Édouard Roger-Vasselin; 6–4, 6–4	(France) Pierre-Hugues Herbert (France) Nicolas Mahut	(Belgium) David Goffin (United Kingdom) Kyle Edmund	(Romania) Marius Copil (Uruguay) Pablo Cuevas (Germany) Jan-Lennard Struff (Italy) Andreas Seppi
17 Oct	Stockholm Open; Stockholm, Sweden; ATP World Tour 250; Hard (i) – €635,645 – 28S/16D; Singles – Doubles	(Argentina) Juan Martín del Potro; 7–5, 6–1	(United States) Jack Sock	(Germany) Alexander Zverev (Bulgaria) Grigor Dimitrov	(Portugal) Gastão Elias (Germany) Tobias Kamke (Croatia) Ivo Karlović (South Africa) Kevin Anderson
17 Oct	Stockholm Open; Stockholm, Sweden; ATP World Tour 250; Hard (i) – €635,645 – 28S/16D; Singles – Doubles	(Sweden) Elias Ymer (Sweden) Mikael Ymer; 6–1, 6–1	(Croatia) Mate Pavić (New Zealand) Michael Venus	(Germany) Alexander Zverev (Bulgaria) Grigor Dimitrov	(Portugal) Gastão Elias (Germany) Tobias Kamke (Croatia) Ivo Karlović (South Africa) Kevin Anderson
24 Oct	Vienna Open; Vienna, Austria; ATP World Tour 500; Hard (i) – €2,467,310 – 32S/16D; Singles – Doubles	(United Kingdom) Andy Murray; 6–3, 7–6^{(8–6)}	(France) Jo-Wilfried Tsonga	(Spain) David Ferrer (Croatia) Ivo Karlović	(United States) John Isner (Serbia) Viktor Troicki (Spain) Albert Ramos Viñolas (Russia) Karen Khachanov
24 Oct	Vienna Open; Vienna, Austria; ATP World Tour 500; Hard (i) – €2,467,310 – 32S/16D; Singles – Doubles	(Poland) Łukasz Kubot (Brazil) Marcelo Melo; 4–6, 6–3, [13–11]	(Austria) Oliver Marach (France) Fabrice Martin	(Spain) David Ferrer (Croatia) Ivo Karlović	(United States) John Isner (Serbia) Viktor Troicki (Spain) Albert Ramos Viñolas (Russia) Karen Khachanov
24 Oct	Swiss Indoors; Basel, Switzerland; ATP World Tour 500; Hard (i) – €2,151,985 – 32S/16D; Singles – Doubles	(Croatia) Marin Čilić; 6–1, 7–6^{(7–5)}	(Japan) Kei Nishikori	(Germany) Mischa Zverev (Luxembourg) Gilles Müller	(Switzerland) Stan Wawrinka (Spain) Marcel Granollers (Argentina) Juan Martín del Potro (Argentina) Federico Delbonis
24 Oct	Swiss Indoors; Basel, Switzerland; ATP World Tour 500; Hard (i) – €2,151,985 – 32S/16D; Singles – Doubles	(Spain) Marcel Granollers (United States) Jack Sock; 6–3, 6–4	(Sweden) Robert Lindstedt (New Zealand) Michael Venus	(Germany) Mischa Zverev (Luxembourg) Gilles Müller	(Switzerland) Stan Wawrinka (Spain) Marcel Granollers (Argentina) Juan Martín del Potro (Argentina) Federico Delbonis
31 Oct	Paris Masters; Paris, France; ATP World Tour Masters 1000; Hard (i) – €3,748,925 – 48S/24D; Singles – Doubles	(United Kingdom) Andy Murray; 6–3, 6–7^{(4–7)}, 6–4	(United States) John Isner	(Croatia) Marin Čilić (Canada) Milos Raonic	(Serbia) Novak Djokovic (United States) Jack Sock (France) Jo-Wilfried Tsonga (Czech Republic) Tomáš Berdych
31 Oct	Paris Masters; Paris, France; ATP World Tour Masters 1000; Hard (i) – €3,748,925 – 48S/24D; Singles – Doubles	(Finland) Henri Kontinen (Australia) John Peers; 6–4, 3–6, [10–6]	(France) Pierre-Hugues Herbert (France) Nicolas Mahut	(Croatia) Marin Čilić (Canada) Milos Raonic	(Serbia) Novak Djokovic (United States) Jack Sock (France) Jo-Wilfried Tsonga (Czech Republic) Tomáš Berdych

=== November ===
Week	Tournament	Champions	Runners-up	Semifinalists	Quarterfinalists
7 Nov	No tournaments scheduled.				
14 Nov	ATP World Tour Finals; London, United Kingdom; ATP World Tour Finals; Hard (i) – $7,500,000 – 8S/8D (RR); Singles – Doubles	(United Kingdom) Andy Murray; 6–3, 6–4	(Serbia) Novak Djokovic	(Canada) Milos Raonic (Japan) Kei Nishikori	Round Robin (Switzerland) Stan Wawrinka (Croatia) Marin Čilić (Austria) Dominic Thiem (Belgium) David Goffin (France) Gaël Monfils
14 Nov	ATP World Tour Finals; London, United Kingdom; ATP World Tour Finals; Hard (i) – $7,500,000 – 8S/8D (RR); Singles – Doubles	(Finland) Henri Kontinen (Australia) John Peers; 2–6, 6–1, [10–8]	(South Africa) Raven Klaasen (United States) Rajeev Ram	(Canada) Milos Raonic (Japan) Kei Nishikori	Round Robin (Switzerland) Stan Wawrinka (Croatia) Marin Čilić (Austria) Dominic Thiem (Belgium) David Goffin (France) Gaël Monfils
21 Nov	Davis Cup Final; Zagreb, Croatia – hard (i)	Argentina; 3–2	Croatia		

== Statistical information ==
These tables present the number of singles (S), doubles (D), and mixed doubles (X) titles won by each player and each nation during the season, within all the tournament categories of the 2016 ATP World Tour: the Grand Slam tournaments, the tennis event at the Rio Summer Olympics, the ATP World Tour Finals, the ATP World Tour Masters 1000, the ATP World Tour 500 series, and the ATP World Tour 250 series. The players/nations are sorted by:

1. Total number of titles (a doubles title won by two players representing the same nation counts as only one win for the nation);
2. Cumulated importance of those titles (one Grand Slam win equals two Masters 1000 wins, one ATP World Tour Finals win equals one-and-a-half Masters 1000 win, one Masters 1000 win equals two 500 events wins, one 500 event win equals two 250 events wins);
3. A singles > doubles > mixed doubles hierarchy;
4. Alphabetical order (by family names for players).

=== Key ===
Grand Slam
ATP World Tour Finals
Summer Olympics
ATP World Tour Masters 1000
ATP World Tour 500
ATP World Tour 250

=== Titles won by player ===
Total	Player	Grand Slam			Olympic Games			ATP Finals		Masters 1000		Tour 500		Tour 250		Total		
Total	Player	S	D	X	S	D	X	S	D	S	D	S	D	S	D	S	D	X
9	Andy Murray (GBR)	●			●			●		● ● ●		● ● ●				9	0	0
8	Henri Kontinen (FIN)			●					●		●		●		● ● ● ●	0	7	1
7	Novak Djokovic (SRB)	● ●								● ● ● ●				●		7	0	0
7	Nicolas Mahut (FRA)		●								● ● ●		● ●	●		1	6	0
5	Pierre-Hugues Herbert (FRA)		●								● ● ●		●			0	5	0
5	Mate Pavić (CRO)			●											● ● ● ●	0	4	1
5	John Peers (AUS)								●		●		●		● ●	0	5	0
4	Bruno Soares (BRA)		● ●	●											●	0	3	1
4	Stan Wawrinka (SUI)	●										●		● ●		4	0	0
4	Rafael Nadal (ESP)					●				●		●	●			2	2	0
4	Dominic Thiem (AUT)											●		● ● ●		4	0	0
4	Pablo Carreño Busta (ESP)												●	● ●	●	2	2	0
4	Juan Sebastián Cabal (COL)												●		● ● ●	0	4	0
4	Robert Farah (COL)												●		● ● ●	0	4	0
4	Michael Venus (NZL)														● ● ● ●	0	4	0
4	Horacio Zeballos (ARG)														● ● ● ●	0	4	0
3	Jamie Murray (GBR)		● ●												●	0	3	0
3	Marc López (ESP)		●			●									●	0	3	0
3	Feliciano López (ESP)		●											●	●	1	2	0
3	Jack Sock (USA)						●				●		●			0	2	1
3	Marcelo Melo (BRA)										● ●		●			0	3	0
3	Bob Bryan (USA)										●		●		●	0	3	0
3	Mike Bryan (USA)										●		●		●	0	3	0
3	Martin Kližan (SVK)											● ●			●	2	1	0
3	Marcel Granollers (ESP)												● ●		●	0	3	0
3	Nick Kyrgios (AUS)											●		● ●		3	0	0
3	Daniel Nestor (CAN)												●		● ●	0	3	0
3	Julio Peralta (CHI)														● ● ●	0	3	0
2	Ivan Dodig (CRO)										● ●					0	2	0
2	Marin Čilić (CRO)									●		●				2	0	0
2	Horia Tecău (ROU)										●				●	0	2	0
2	Pablo Cuevas (URU)											●		●		2	0	0
2	Raven Klaasen (RSA)												●		●	0	2	0
2	Rajeev Ram (USA)												●		●	0	2	0
2	Édouard Roger-Vasselin (FRA)												●		●	0	2	0
2	Roberto Bautista Agut (ESP)													● ●		2	0	0
2	Richard Gasquet (FRA)													● ●		2	0	0
2	Ivo Karlović (CRO)													● ●		2	0	0
2	Fabio Fognini (ITA)													●	●	1	1	0
2	Steve Johnson (USA)													●	●	1	1	0
2	Sam Querrey (USA)													●	●	1	1	0
2	Guillermo Durán (ARG)														● ●	0	2	0
2	Dominic Inglot (GBR)														● ●	0	2	0
2	Wesley Koolhof (NED)														● ●	0	2	0
2	Oliver Marach (AUT)														● ●	0	2	0
2	David Marrero (ESP)														● ●	0	2	0
2	Fabrice Martin (FRA)														● ●	0	2	0
2	Matwé Middelkoop (NED)														● ●	0	2	0
1	Leander Paes (IND)			●												0	0	1
1	John Isner (USA)										●					0	1	0
1	Jean-Julien Rojer (NED)										●					0	1	0
1	Florian Mayer (GER)											●				1	0	0
1	Gaël Monfils (FRA)											●				1	0	0
1	Simone Bolelli (ITA)												●			0	1	0
1	Treat Huey (PHI)												●			0	1	0
1	Łukasz Kubot (POL)												●			0	1	0
1	Marcin Matkowski (POL)												●			0	1	0
1	Max Mirnyi (BLR)												●			0	1	0
1	Vasek Pospisil (CAN)												●			0	1	0
1	Andreas Seppi (ITA)												●			0	1	0
1	Nicolás Almagro (ESP)													●		1	0	0
1	Tomáš Berdych (CZE)													●		1	0	0
1	Federico Delbonis (ARG)													●		1	0	0
1	Juan Martín del Potro (ARG)													●		1	0	0
1	Víctor Estrella Burgos (DOM)													●		1	0	0
1	Karen Khachanov (RUS)													●		1	0	0
1	Philipp Kohlschreiber (GER)													●		1	0	0
1	Paolo Lorenzi (ITA)													●		1	0	0
1	Juan Mónaco (ARG)													●		1	0	0
1	Kei Nishikori (JPN)													●		1	0	0
1	Lucas Pouille (FRA)													●		1	0	0
1	Albert Ramos Viñolas (ESP)													●		1	0	0
1	Milos Raonic (CAN)													●		1	0	0
1	Diego Schwartzman (ARG)													●		1	0	0
1	Viktor Troicki (SRB)													●		1	0	0
1	Fernando Verdasco (ESP)													●		1	0	0
1	Alexander Zverev (GER)													●		1	0	0
1	Eric Butorac (USA)														●	0	1	0
1	Flavio Cipolla (ITA)														●	0	1	0
1	Marcus Daniell (NZL)														●	0	1	0
1	Mariusz Fyrstenberg (POL)														●	0	1	0
1	Guillermo García López (ESP)														●	0	1	0
1	Máximo González (ARG)														●	0	1	0
1	Santiago González (MEX)														●	0	1	0
1	Sam Groth (AUS)														●	0	1	0
1	Chris Guccione (AUS)														●	0	1	0
1	Robert Lindstedt (SWE)														●	0	1	0
1	Scott Lipsky (USA)														●	0	1	0
1	Florin Mergea (ROU)														●	0	1	0
1	Andrés Molteni (ARG)														●	0	1	0
1	Purav Raja (IND)														●	0	1	0
1	Dudi Sela (ISR)														●	0	1	0
1	Divij Sharan (IND)														●	0	1	0
1	Artem Sitak (NZL)														●	0	1	0
1	Elias Ymer (SWE)														●	0	1	0
1	Mikael Ymer (SWE)														●	0	1	0

=== Titles won by nation ===
Total	Nation	Grand Slam			Olympic Games			ATP Finals		Masters 1000		Tour 500		Tour 250		Total		
Total	Nation	S	D	X	S	D	X	S	D	S	D	S	D	S	D	S	D	X
20	Spain (ESP)		1			1				1		1	3	8	5	10	10	0
15	France (FRA)		1								3	1	3	4	3	5	10	0
14	Great Britain (GBR)	1	2		1			1		3		3			3	9	5	0
12	United States (USA)						1				2		3	2	4	2	9	1
11	Croatia (CRO)			1						1	2	1		2	4	4	6	1
10	Argentina (ARG)													4	6	4	6	0
9	Australia (AUS)								1		1	1	1	2	3	3	6	0
8	Serbia (SRB)	2								4				2		8	0	0
8	Finland (FIN)			1					1		1		1		4	0	7	1
7	Brazil (BRA)		2	1							2		1		1	0	6	1
6	Austria (AUT)											1		3	2	4	2	0
5	Italy (ITA)												1	2	2	2	3	0
5	New Zealand (NZL)														5	0	5	0
4	Switzerland (SUI)	1										1		2		4	0	0
4	Canada (CAN)												2	1	1	1	3	0
4	Colombia (COL)												1		3	0	4	0
3	Netherlands (NED)										1				2	0	3	0
3	Slovakia (SVK)											2			1	2	1	0
3	Poland (POL)												2		1	0	3	0
3	Germany (GER)											1		2		3	0	0
3	Chile (CHI)														3	0	3	0
2	India (IND)			1											1	0	1	1
2	Romania (ROU)										1				1	0	2	0
2	Uruguay (URU)											1		1		2	0	0
2	South Africa (RSA)												1		1	0	2	0
2	Sweden (SWE)														2	0	2	0
1	Belarus (BLR)												1			0	1	0
1	Philippines (PHI)												1			0	1	0
1	Czech Republic (CZE)													1		1	0	0
1	Dominican Republic (DOM)													1		1	0	0
1	Japan (JPN)													1		1	0	0
1	Russia (RUS)													1		1	0	0
1	Israel (ISR)														1	0	1	0
1	Mexico (MEX)														1	0	1	0

=== Titles information ===
The following players won their first main circuit title in singles, doubles, or mixed doubles:

Singles

- (Australia) Nick Kyrgios – Marseille (draw)
- (Argentina) Diego Schwartzman – Istanbul (draw)
- (United States) Steve Johnson – Nottingham (draw)
- (Spain) Albert Ramos Viñolas – Båstad (draw)
- (Italy) Paolo Lorenzi – Kitzbühel (draw)
- (Spain) Pablo Carreño Busta – Winston-Salem (draw)
- (France) Lucas Pouille – Metz (draw)
- (Germany) Alexander Zverev – St. Petersburg (draw)
- (Russia) Karen Khachanov — Chengdu (draw)

Doubles

- (France) Fabrice Martin – Chennai (draw)
- (Spain) Pablo Carreño Busta – Quito (draw)
- (Argentina) Guillermo Durán – Quito (draw)
- (Netherlands) Wesley Koolhof – Sofia (draw)
- (Netherlands) Matwé Middelkoop – Sofia (draw)
- (Italy) Andreas Seppi – Dubai (draw)
- (Chile) Julio Peralta – São Paulo (draw)
- (Italy) Flavio Cipolla – Istanbul (draw)
- (Israel) Dudi Sela – Istanbul (draw)
- (United States) Steve Johnson – Geneva (draw)
- (Argentina) Andrés Molteni – Atlanta (draw)
- (Sweden) Elias Ymer – Stockholm (draw)
- (Sweden) Mikael Ymer – Stockholm (draw)

Mixed doubles

- (Finland) Henri Kontinen – Wimbledon (draw)
- (Croatia) Mate Pavić – US Open (draw)

The following players defended a main circuit title in singles, doubles, or mixed doubles:

Singles

- (Switzerland) Stan Wawrinka – Chennai (draw)
- (Serbia) Viktor Troicki – Sydney (draw)
- (Serbia) Novak Djokovic – Australian Open (draw), Indian Wells (draw), Miami (draw)
- (France) Richard Gasquet – Montpellier (draw)
- (Dominican Republic) Víctor Estrella Burgos – Quito (draw)
- (Japan) Kei Nishikori – Memphis (draw)
- (Uruguay) Pablo Cuevas – São Paulo (draw)
- (Austria) Dominic Thiem – Nice (draw)
- (France) Nicolas Mahut – 's-Hertogenbosch (draw)
- (United Kingdom) Andy Murray – London (draw), Summer Olympics (draw)
- (Czech Republic) Tomáš Berdych — Shenzhen (draw)

Doubles

- (Australia) John Peers – Brisbane (draw), Hamburg (draw)
- (Poland) Mariusz Fyrstenberg – Memphis (draw)
- (Mexico) Santiago González – Memphis (draw)
- (United States) Scott Lipsky – Estoril (draw)
- (France) Pierre-Hugues Herbert – London (draw)
- (France) Nicolas Mahut – London (draw)
- (Finland) Henri Kontinen – St. Petersburg (draw)
- (Poland) Łukasz Kubot – Vienna (draw)
- (Brazil) Marcelo Melo – Vienna (draw)

=== Top 10 entry ===
The following players entered the top 10 for the first time in their careers:

Singles

- (Austria) Dominic Thiem (enters at #7 on June 6)

Doubles

- (South Africa) Raven Klaasen (enters at #9 on July 11)
- (Spain) Feliciano López (enters at #9 on November 7)
- (Finland) Henri Kontinen (enters at #10 on November 7)

== ATP rankings ==
These are the ATP rankings of the top 20 singles players, doubles players, and the top 10 doubles teams on the ATP Tour, at the current date of the 2016 season.

=== Singles ===
Singles race rankings final rankings
#	Player	Points	Tours
1	Andy Murray (GBR)	11,185	16
2	Novak Djokovic (SRB)	10,780	16
3	Stan Wawrinka (SUI)	5,115	20
4	Milos Raonic (CAN)	5,050	18
5	Kei Nishikori (JPN)	4,705	19
6	Gaël Monfils (FRA)	3,625	17
7	Marin Čilić (CRO)	3,450	21
8	Rafael Nadal (ESP)	3,300	17
9	Dominic Thiem (AUT)	3,215	27
10	Tomáš Berdych (CZE)	3,060	21
11	David Goffin (BEL)	2,780	24
12	Jo-Wilfried Tsonga (FRA)	2,550	18
13	Nick Kyrgios (AUS)	2,460	20
14	Roberto Bautista Agut (ESP)	2,350	26
15	Lucas Pouille (FRA)	2,196	25
16	Roger Federer (SUI)	2,130	7
17	Grigor Dimitrov (BUL)	2,035	26
18	Richard Gasquet (FRA)	1,885	19
19	John Isner (USA)	1,850	21
20	Ivo Karlović (CRO)	1,795	24

Player competed at the 2016 ATP World Tour Finals
Player qualified for but did not compete at the 2016 ATP World Tour Finals

Year-end rankings 2016 (26 December 2016)
#	Player	Points	#Trn	'15 Rk	High	Low	'15→'16
1	Andy Murray (GBR)	12,410	17	2	1	3	▲1
2	Novak Djokovic (SRB)	11,780	17	1	1	2	▼1
3	Milos Raonic (CAN)	5,450	19	14	3	14	▲11
4	Stan Wawrinka (SUI)	5,315	21	4	3	5	Steady
5	Kei Nishikori (JPN)	4,905	20	8	4	8	▲3
6	Marin Čilić (CRO)	3,650	22	13	6	13	▲7
7	Gaël Monfils (FRA)	3,625	18	24	6	25	▲17
8	Dominic Thiem (AUT)	3,415	28	20	7	20	▲12
9	Rafael Nadal (ESP)	3,300	16	5	4	9	▼4
10	Tomáš Berdych (CZE)	3,060	21	6	4	10	▼4
11	David Goffin (BEL)	2,750	25	16	11	18	▲5
12	Jo-Wilfried Tsonga (FRA)	2,550	17	10	7	12	▼2
13	Nick Kyrgios (AUS)	2,460	20	30	13	41	▲17
14	Roberto Bautista Agut (ESP)	2,350	25	25	13	25	▲11
15	Lucas Pouille (FRA)	2,156	24	75	15	90	▲60
16	Roger Federer (SUI)	2,130	7	3	2	16	▼13
17	Grigor Dimitrov (BUL)	2,035	25	28	17	39	▲11
18	Richard Gasquet (FRA)	1,885	20	9	9	18	▼9
19	John Isner (USA)	1,850	21	11	10	25	▼8
20	Ivo Karlović (CRO)	1,795	24	23	20	34	▲4

==== Number 1 ranking ====
Holder	Date gained	Date forfeited
Novak Djokovic (SRB)	Year end 2015	6 November 2016
Andy Murray (GBR)	7 November 2016	Year end 2016

=== Doubles ===
Doubles team race rankings final rankings
#	Team	Points	Tours
1	Jamie Murray (GBR); Bruno Soares (BRA)	7,850	20
2	Pierre-Hugues Herbert (FRA); Nicolas Mahut (FRA)	7,825	15
3	Bob Bryan (USA); Mike Bryan (USA)	6,950	23
4	Henri Kontinen (FIN); John Peers (AUS)	5,810	24
5	Feliciano López (ESP); Marc López (ESP)	4,640	18
6	Raven Klaasen (RSA); Rajeev Ram (USA)	4,490	23
7	Ivan Dodig (CRO); Marcelo Melo (BRA)	4,330	15
8	Treat Huey (PHI); Max Mirnyi (BLR)	3,155	24
9	Jean-Julien Rojer (NED); Horia Tecău (ROU)	2,860	17
10	Juan Sebastián Cabal (COL); Robert Farah (COL)	2,570	24

Team competed at the 2016 ATP World Tour Finals

| class="col-break " style=" padding-left: 2em;" |

Year-end rankings 2016 (26 December 2016)
#	Player	Points	#Trn	15' Rank	High	Low	'15→'16
1	Nicolas Mahut (FRA)	8,550	17	12	1	16	▲11
2	Pierre-Hugues Herbert (FRA)	7,935	15	14	2	18	▲12
3	Bruno Soares (BRA)	7,760	25	22	2	22	▲19
4	Jamie Murray (GBR)	7,670	22	7	1	7	▲3
5	Bob Bryan (USA)	6,590	23	4	3	9	▼1
5	Mike Bryan (USA)	6,590	23	5	4	10	Steady
7	Henri Kontinen (FIN)	5,590	27	31	7	44	▲24
8	Marcelo Melo (BRA)	5,460	26	1	1	8	▼7
9	John Peers (AUS)	5,450	28	8	8	28	▼1
10	Marc López (ESP)	4,775	24	32	8	40	▲22
11	Feliciano López (ESP)	4,640	20	35	9	42	▲24
12	Raven Klaasen (RSA)	4,460	24	20	9	21	▲8
13	Ivan Dodig (CRO)	4,420	20	6	6	15	▼7
14	Rajeev Ram (USA)	4,400	27	36	14	36	▲22
15	Daniel Nestor (CAN)	4,120	26	18	8	19	▲3
16	Jack Sock (USA)	4,080	14	19	11	25	▲3
17	Édouard Roger-Vasselin (FRA)	3,780	23	17	7	22	Steady
18	Marcel Granollers (ESP)	3,665	22	39	18	42	▲21
19	Horia Tecău (ROU)	3,650	21	2	2	19	▼17
20	Vasek Pospisil (CAN)	3,590	16	21	12	23	▲1

==== Number 1 ranking ====
Holder	Date gained	Date forfeited
Marcelo Melo (BRA)	Year end 2015	3 April 2016
Jamie Murray (GBR)	4 April 2016	8 May 2016
Marcelo Melo (BRA)	9 May 2016	5 June 2016
Nicolas Mahut (FRA)	6 June 2016	12 June 2016
Jamie Murray (GBR)	13 June 2016	10 July 2016
Nicolas Mahut (FRA)	11 July 2016	Year end 2016

== Best matches by ATPWorldTour.com ==
=== Best 5 Grand Slam matches ===
	Event	Round	Surface	Winner	Opponent	Result
1.	US Open	R4	Hard	(France) Lucas Pouille	(Spain) Rafael Nadal	6–1, 2–6, 6–4, 3–6, 7–6^{(8–6)}
2.	Wimbledon	QF	Grass	(Switzerland) Roger Federer	(Croatia) Marin Čilić	6–7^{(4–7)}, 4–6, 6–3, 7–6^{(11–9)}, 6–3
3.	Australian Open	R1	Hard	(Spain) Fernando Verdasco	(Spain) Rafael Nadal	7–6^{(8–6)}, 4–6, 3–6, 7–6^{(7–4)}, 6–2
4.	French Open	F	Clay	(Serbia) Novak Djokovic	(United Kingdom) Andy Murray	3–6, 6–1, 6–2, 6–4
5.	US Open	QF	Hard	(Japan) Kei Nishikori	(United Kingdom) Andy Murray	1–6, 6–4, 4–6, 6–1, 7–5

=== Best 5 ATP World Tour matches ===
	Event	Round	Surface	Winner	Opponent	Result
1.	ATP Finals	SF	Hard (i)	(United Kingdom) Andy Murray	(Canada) Milos Raonic	5–7, 7–6^{(7–5)}, 7–6^{(11–9)}
2.	ATP Finals	RR	Hard (i)	(United Kingdom) Andy Murray	(Japan) Kei Nishikori	6–7^{(9–11)}, 6–4, 6–4
3.	Rio Open	SF	Clay	(Uruguay) Pablo Cuevas	(Spain) Rafael Nadal	6–7^{(6–8)}, 7–6^{(7–3)}, 6–4
4.	Italian Open	QF	Clay	(Serbia) Novak Djokovic	(Spain) Rafael Nadal	7–5, 7–6^{(7–4)}
5.	Monte-Carlo Masters	F	Clay	(Spain) Rafael Nadal	(France) Gaël Monfils	7–5, 5–7, 6–0

== Prize money leaders ==
#	Player	Year-to-date
1	Andy Murray (GBR)	$16,349,701
2	Novak Djokovic (SRB)	$14,138,824
3	Stan Wawrinka (SUI)	$6,856,954
4	Milos Raonic (CAN)	$5,588,492
5	Kei Nishikori (JPN)	$4,806,748
6	Marin Čilić (CRO)	$3,475,205
7	Gaël Monfils (FRA)	$3,372,418
8	Dominic Thiem (AUT)	$3,152,363
9	Rafael Nadal (ESP)	$2,836,500
10	Tomáš Berdych (CZE)	$2,612,055
as of December 26, 2016

== Point distribution ==
Category	W	F	SF	QF	R16	R32	R64	R128	Q	Q3	Q2	Q1
Grand Slam (128S)	2000	1200	720	360	180	90	45	10	25	16	8	0
Grand Slam (64D)	2000	1200	720	360	180	90	0	–	25	–	0	0
ATP World Tour Finals (8S/8D)	1500 (max) 1100 (min)	1000 (max) 600 (min)	600 (max); 200 (min)	200 for each round robin match win, +400 for a semifinal win, +500 for the final win.								
ATP World Tour Masters 1000 (96S)	1000	600	360	180	90	45	25	10	16	–	8	0
ATP World Tour Masters 1000 (56S/48S)	1000	600	360	180	90	45	10	–	25	–	16	0
ATP World Tour Masters 1000 (32D/24D)	1000	600	360	180	90	0	–	–	–	–	–	–
Summer Olympics (64S)	–	–	–	–	–	–	–	–	–	–	–	–
ATP World Tour 500 (48S)	500	300	180	90	45	20	0	–	10	–	4	0
ATP World Tour 500 (32S)	500	300	180	90	45	0	–	–	20	–	10	0
ATP World Tour 500 (16D)	500	300	180	90	0	–	–	–	45	–	25	0
ATP World Tour 250 (48S)	250	150	90	45	20	10	0	–	5	–	3	0
ATP World Tour 250 (32S/28S)	250	150	90	45	20	0	–	–	12	–	6	0
ATP World Tour 250 (16D)	250	150	90	45	0	–	–	–	–	–	–	–

== Retirements ==
Following is a list of notable players (winners of a main tour title, and/or part of the ATP rankings top 100 (singles) or top 50 (doubles) for at least one week) who announced their retirement from professional tennis, became inactive (after not playing for more than 52 weeks), or were permanently banned from playing, during the 2016 season:

- Andreas Beck (born 5 February 1986 in Weingarten, Germany), career-high singles ranking of no. 33, announced his retirement in October 2016.
- Michael Berrer (born 1 July 1980 in Stuttgart, Germany), career-high singles ranking of no. 42, announced his retirement on 10 December 2016.
- Eric Butorac (born 22 May 1981 in Rochester, Massachusetts, United States), career-high doubles ranking of no. 17. He won 18 ATP doubles titles. He announced the 2016 US Open would be his last tournament.
- (Czech Republic) František Čermák (born 14 November 1976 in Valtice, Czechoslovakia), career-high doubles ranking of no. 14. He won thirty-one doubles titles. Čermák retired from professional tennis in early 2016.
- Lleyton Hewitt (born 24 February 1981 in Adelaide, Australia), joined the pro tour in 1998, reached a career-high singles ranking of no. 1 on 19 November 2001. He won two Grand Slam singles titles in 2001 US Open and 2002 Wimbledon. On 29 January 2015, he announced the 2016 Australian Open would be his last tournament, although he did come out of retirement to play for Australia for the First Round of Davis Cup World Group at Kooyong in doubles match in March 2016, and he played in the men's doubles at the 2016 Wimbledon Championships.
- Jesse Huta Galung (born 6 October 1985 in Hillegom, Netherlands), career-high singles ranking of no. 91.
- (United States) Alex Kuznetsov (born 5 February 1987, in Kyiv, Ukrainian SSR) joined the professional tour in 2004 and reached career-high rankings of No. 78 in doubles in September 2007. Kuznetsov announced he had retired in this season.
- Rui Machado (born 10 April 1984 in Faro, Portugal), career-high singles ranking of no. 59, announced his retirement on 9 June 2016.
- Philipp Marx (born 3 February 1982, in Biedenkopf, Germany) joined the professional tour in 2001 and reached career-high rankings of No. 53 in doubles in September 2010. Marx announced he had retired in this season.
- Julian Reister (born 2 April 1986 in Reinbek, Germany), career-high singles ranking of no. 83.
- Thomas Schoorel (born 8 April 1989 in Amsterdam, Netherlands), career-high singles ranking of no. 94, announced his retirement on 29 June 2016.
- Victor Hănescu (born 21 July 1981 in Bucharest, Romania), career-high singles ranking of no. 26.

== See also ==
- 2016 WTA Tour
- 2016 ATP Challenger Tour
- Association of Tennis Professionals
- International Tennis Federation
