= 2016 Brasil Open =

- Date: February 22–28
- Edition: 16th
- Category: ATP World Tour 250
- Draw: 28S / 16D
- Prize money: $436,220
- Surface: Clay - indoor
- Location: São Paulo, Brazil

Champions

Singles
- (Uruguay) Pablo Cuevas

Doubles
- (Chile) Julio Peralta / (Argentina) Horacio Zeballos
- Brasil Open

The 2016 Brasil Open was a tennis tournament played on outdoor clay courts. It was the 16th edition of the Brasil Open, and part of the ATP World Tour 250 series of the 2016 ATP World Tour. It took place from February 22 through February 28, 2016, in São Paulo, Brazil. Third-seeded Pablo Cuevas won the singles title.

== Finals ==
=== Singles ===
- (Uruguay) Pablo Cuevas defeated (Spain) Pablo Carreño Busta 7–6^{(7–4)}, 6–3

=== Doubles ===
- (Chile) Julio Peralta / (Argentina) Horacio Zeballos defeated (Spain) Pablo Carreño Busta / (Spain) David Marrero 4–6, 6–1, [10–5]

== Singles main-draw entrants ==
=== Seeds ===
Country	Player	Ranking^{1}	Seed
FRA	Benoît Paire	22	1
BRA	Thomaz Bellucci	32	2
URU	Pablo Cuevas	45	3
ARG	Federico Delbonis	46	4
ESP	Albert Ramos Viñolas	47	5
ITA	Paolo Lorenzi	50	6
ESP	Nicolás Almagro	53	7
ESP	Pablo Andújar	62	8

- ^{1} Rankings as of February 15, 2016.

=== Other entrants ===
The following players received wildcards into the main draw:

- (Brazil) Guilherme Clezar
- (Brazil) Thiago Monteiro
- (France) Benoît Paire

The following players received entry from the qualifying draw:

- (Argentina) Facundo Bagnis
- (Portugal) Gastão Elias
- (Argentina) Máximo González
- (Slovenia) Blaž Rola

The following player received entry as a lucky loser:

- (Spain) Roberto Carballés Baena

=== Withdrawals ===
Before the tournament

- (Italy) Fabio Fognini (abdominal strain) → replaced by (Spain) Daniel Gimeno Traver
- (Argentina) Guido Pella (non medical)→replaced by (Italy) Luca Vanni

=== Retirements ===
- (Spain) Pablo Andújar (right elbow injury)
- (Argentina) Horacio Zeballos (dehydration)

== Doubles main-draw entrants ==
=== Seeds ===
Country	Player	Country	Player	Rank^{1}	Seed
BRA	Marcelo Melo	BRA	Bruno Soares	11	1
~~URU~~	~~Pablo Cuevas~~	~~ESP~~	~~Marcel Granollers~~	~~62~~	~~2~~
ARG	Máximo González	BRA	André Sá	104	3
USA	Nicholas Monroe	AUT	Philipp Oswald	115	4

- ^{1} Rankings are as of February 15, 2016.

=== Other entrants ===
The following pairs received wildcards into the main draw:

- (Spain) Nicolás Almagro / (Brazil) Eduardo Russi Assumpção
- (Brazil) Rogério Dutra Silva / (Brazil) João Souza

The following pair received entry as alternates:

- (Brazil) Pedro Bernardi / (Brazil) Guilherme Clezar

=== Withdrawals ===
Before the tournament

- (Spain) Marcel Granollers (lower back injury)
