= 2016 St. Petersburg Open =

- Date: 19–25 September
- Edition: 21st
- Category: ATP World Tour 250 Series
- Surface: Hard / indoor
- Location: St. Petersburg, Russia
- Venue: Sibur Arena

Champions

Singles
- (Germany) Alexander Zverev

Doubles
- (United Kingdom) Dominic Inglot / (Finland) Henri Kontinen
- St. Petersburg Open

The 2016 St. Petersburg Open was a tennis tournament played on indoor hard courts. It was the 21st edition of the St. Petersburg Open, and part of the ATP World Tour 250 Series of the 2016 ATP World Tour. It took place at the Sibur Arena in Saint Petersburg, Russia, from 19 September through 25 September 2016. Fifth-seeded Alexander Zverev won the singles title.

== Finals ==
=== Singles ===
- (Germany) Alexander Zverev defeated (Switzerland) Stan Wawrinka, 6–2, 3–6, 7–5

=== Doubles ===
- (United Kingdom) Dominic Inglot / (Finland) Henri Kontinen defeated (Germany) Andre Begemann / (India) Leander Paes, 4–6, 6–3, [12–10]

== Singles main-draw entrants ==
=== Seeds ===
Country	Player	Rank^{1}	Seed
SUI	Stan Wawrinka	3	1
CAN	Milos Raonic	6	2
CZE	Tomáš Berdych	9	3
ESP	Roberto Bautista Agut	16	4
GER	Alexander Zverev	27	5
ESP	Albert Ramos Viñolas	32	6
SRB	Viktor Troicki	33	7
POR	João Sousa	34	8

- ^{1} Rankings are as of September 12, 2016

=== Other entrants ===
The following players received wildcards into the singles main draw:

- (Russia) Alexander Bublik
- (Russia) Karen Khachanov
- (Russia) Andrey Rublev

The following player received entry using a protected ranking:

- (Serbia) Janko Tipsarević

The following players received entry from the qualifying draw:

- (Moldova) Radu Albot
- (Russia) Daniil Medvedev
- (France) Alexandre Sidorenko
- (Germany) Mischa Zverev

=== Withdrawals ===
Before the tournament

- (Cyprus) Marcos Baghdatis →replaced by (Russia) Evgeny Donskoy
- (Spain) Pablo Carreño Busta →replaced by (Czech Republic) Lukáš Rosol
- (Latvia) Ernests Gulbis →replaced by (Serbia) Dušan Lajović
- (Czech Republic) Jiří Veselý →replaced by (Lithuania) Ričardas Berankis

=== Retirements ===
- (Kazakhstan) Mikhail Kukushkin

== Doubles main-draw entrants ==
=== Seeds ===
Country	Player	Country	Player	Rank^{1}	Seed
GBR	Dominic Inglot	FIN	Henri Kontinen	65	1
POL	Marcin Matkowski	SRB	Nenad Zimonjić	86	2
NED	Wesley Koolhof	NED	Matwé Middelkoop	114	3
ARG	Andrés Molteni	CHI	Hans Podlipnik Castillo	115	4

- Rankings are as of September 12, 2016

=== Other entrants ===
The following pairs received wildcards into the doubles main draw:

- (Russia) Alexander Bublik / (Russia) Evgeny Donskoy
- (Russia) Mikhail Elgin / (Russia) Alexander Kudryavtsev
