= 2016 Open 13 Provence =

Coordinates: 43.2710°N 5.4010°E

- Date: 15–21 February
- Edition: 24th
- Category: ATP 250 Series
- Draw: 28S / 16D
- Prize money: €596,790
- Surface: Hard / Indoors
- Location: Marseille, France
- Venue: Palais des Sports de Marseille

Champions

Singles
- (Australia) Nick Kyrgios

Doubles
- (Croatia) Mate Pavić / (New Zealand) Michael Venus
- Open 13 Provence

The 2016 Open 13 Provence was a men's tennis tournament played on indoor hard courts. It was the 23rd edition of the Open 13, and part of the ATP World Tour 250 series of the 2016 ATP World Tour. It took place at the Palais des Sports in Marseille, France, from 15 February through 21 February 2016. Unseeded Nick Kyrgios won the singles title.

== Finals ==
=== Singles ===
- (Australia) Nick Kyrgios defeated (Croatia) Marin Čilić 6–2, 7–6^{(7–3)}

=== Doubles ===
- (Croatia) Mate Pavić / (New Zealand) Michael Venus defeated (Israel) Jonathan Erlich / (United Kingdom) Colin Fleming 6–2, 6–3

== Points and prize money ==
=== Point distribution ===
Event	W	F	SF	QF	Round of 16	Round of 32	Q	Q2	Q1
Singles	250	150	90	45	20	0	12	6	0
Doubles	250	150	90	45	0	—N/a	—N/a	—N/a	—N/a

=== Prize money ===
Event	W	F	SF	QF	Round of 16	Round of 32	Q2	Q1
Singles	€106,175	€55,920	€30,290	€17,260	€10,170	€6,025	€2,710	€1,355
Doubles	€32,250	€16,960	€9,190	€5,260	€3,080	—N/a	—N/a	—N/a
Doubles prize money per team

== Singles main-draw entrants ==
=== Seeds ===
Country	Player	Rank^{1}	Seed
SUI	Stan Wawrinka	4	1
CZE	Tomáš Berdych	8	2
FRA	Richard Gasquet	10	3
CRO	Marin Čilić	13	4
FRA	Gilles Simon	15	5
BEL	David Goffin	16	6
~~FRA~~	~~Gaël Monfils~~	~~18~~	~~7~~
FRA	Benoît Paire	21	8

- Rankings are as of February 8, 2016.

=== Other entrants ===
The following players received wildcards into the main draw:

- (France) Quentin Halys
- (India) Ramkumar Ramanathan
- (Germany) Alexander Zverev

The following players received entry from the qualifying draw:

- (France) Julien Benneteau
- (France) Kenny de Schepper
- (France) Vincent Millot
- (Germany) Mischa Zverev

The following players received entry as a lucky loser:

- (France) David Guez

=== Withdrawals ===
Before the tournament

- (Croatia) Borna Ćorić →replaced by (France) Nicolas Mahut
- (Poland) Jerzy Janowicz →replaced by (France) Lucas Pouille
- (France) Gaël Monfils(late withdrawal) (right leg injury)→replaced by (France) David Guez

=== Retirements ===
- (Germany) Mischa Zverev (neck injury)

== Doubles main-draw entrants ==
=== Seeds ===
Country	Player	Country	Player	Rank^{1}	Seed
ESP	Feliciano López	ESP	Marc López	72	1
CRO	Mate Pavić	NZL	Michael Venus	82	2
FRA	Nicolas Mahut	FRA	Lucas Pouille	97	3
NED	Wesley Koolhof	NED	Matwé Middelkoop	103	4

- ^{1} Rankings are as of February 8, 2016.

=== Other entrants ===
The following pairs received wildcards into the main draw:

- (France) Julien Benneteau / (France) Édouard Roger-Vasselin
- (Chinese Taipei) Hsieh Cheng-peng / (Chinese Taipei) Yi Chu-huan

The following pair received entry as alternates:

- (France) David Guez / (France) Benoît Paire

=== Withdrawals ===
Before the tournament

- (France) Julien Benneteau (right leg injury)

During the tournament

- (France) Lucas Pouille (bronchitis)
