= 2016 Open 13 Provence – Doubles =

Doubles
- 2016 Open 13 Provence

Final
- Champions: (Croatia) Mate Pavić (New Zealand) Michael Venus
- Runners-up: (Israel) Jonathan Erlich (United Kingdom) Colin Fleming
- Score: 6–2, 6–3

Events
Singles	Doubles
← 2015 ·	Open 13	· 2017 →

Marin Draganja and Henri Kontinen were the defending champions, but Kontinen chose not to participate. Draganja played alongside Julian Knowle, but lost in the quarterfinals to Teymuraz Gabashvili and Nick Kyrgios.
Mate Pavić and Michael Venus won the title, defeating Jonathan Erlich and Colin Fleming in the final, 6–2, 6–3.

== Seeds ==
1. (Spain) Feliciano López / (Spain) Marc López (first round)
2. (Croatia) Mate Pavić / (New Zealand) Michael Venus (champions)
3. (France) Nicolas Mahut / (France) Lucas Pouille (first round, withdrew)
4. (Netherlands) Wesley Koolhof / (Netherlands) Matwé Middelkoop (first round)

== Draw ==
=== Key ===
- Q = Qualifier
- WC = Wild card
- LL = Lucky loser
- Alt = Alternate
- ITF = ITF entry
- PR = Protected ranking
- SR = Special ranking
- SE = Special exempt
- JE = Junior exempt
- JR = Junior Accelerator Programme entrant
- CO = College Accelerator Programme entrant
- NG = Next Gen Accelerator Program entrant
- w/o = Walkover
- r = Retired
- d = Defaulted

=== Draw ===
First round
1	(Spain) F López (Spain) M López	6^{0}	6^{6}
(Netherlands) R Haase (Pakistan) A-u-H Qureshi	7^{7}	7^{8}
PR	(Poland) T Bednarek (Canada) A Shamasdin	6^{0}	2
(Israel) J Erlich (United Kingdom) C Fleming	7^{7}	6
3	(France) N Mahut (France) L Pouille
(Russia) T Gabashvili (Australia) N Kyrgios	w/o
(Croatia) M Draganja (Austria) J Knowle	6	7
WC	(Chinese Taipei) C-p Hsieh (Chinese Taipei) C-h Yi	4	5
(Australia) R Junaid (United Kingdom) J Marray	3	7^{7}	[10]
PR	(Sweden) J Brunström (Slovakia) M Mertinák	6	6^{5}	[5]
(Belarus) A Bury (Slovakia) I Zelenay	6	6
4	(Netherlands) W Koolhof (Netherlands) M Middelkoop	3	2
Alt	(France) D Guez (France) B Paire	5	1
(Poland) M Kowalczyk (Sweden) A Siljeström	7	6
PR	(Czech Republic) L Dlouhý (Ukraine) S Stakhovsky	1	6	[7]
2	(Croatia) M Pavić (New Zealand) M Venus	6	2	[10]

Quarterfinals
(Netherlands) R Haase (Pakistan) A-u-H Qureshi	3	6	[9]
(Israel) J Erlich (United Kingdom) C Fleming	6	3	[11]
(Russia) T Gabashvili (Australia) N Kyrgios	6	6
(Croatia) M Draganja (Austria) J Knowle	3	4
(Australia) R Junaid (United Kingdom) J Marray	6^{6}	7^{11}	[3]
(Belarus) A Bury (Slovakia) I Zelenay	7^{8}	6^{9}	[10]
(Poland) M Kowalczyk (Sweden) A Siljeström	6	2	[7]
2	(Croatia) M Pavić (New Zealand) M Venus	2	6	[10]

Semifinals
(Israel) J Erlich (United Kingdom) C Fleming	6	7^{7}
(Russia) T Gabashvili (Australia) N Kyrgios	2	6^{3}
(Belarus) A Bury (Slovakia) I Zelenay	4	5
2	(Croatia) M Pavić (New Zealand) M Venus	6	7

Final
(Israel) J Erlich (United Kingdom) C Fleming	2	3
2	(Croatia) M Pavić (New Zealand) M Venus	6	6
