= 2016 Brasil Open – Singles =

Singles
- 2016 Brasil Open

Final
- Champion: (Uruguay) Pablo Cuevas
- Runner-up: (Spain) Pablo Carreño Busta
- Score: 7–6^{(7–4)}, 6–3

Details
- Draw: 28
- Seeds: 8

Events
Singles	Doubles
- Brasil Open

Pablo Cuevas was the defending champion and successfully defended his title, defeating Pablo Carreño Busta in the final, 7–6^{(7–4)}, 6–3.

== Seeds ==
The top four seeds receive a bye into the second round.

1. (France) Benoît Paire (second round)
2. (Brazil) Thomaz Bellucci (second round)
3. (Uruguay) Pablo Cuevas (champion)
4. (Argentina) Federico Delbonis (quarterfinals)
5. (Spain) Albert Ramos Viñolas (first round)
6. (Italy) Paolo Lorenzi (first round)
7. (Spain) Nicolás Almagro (first round)
8. (Spain) Pablo Andújar (first round, retired)

== Draw ==
Key

- Q = Qualifier
- WC = Wild card
- LL = Lucky loser
- Alt = Alternate
- ITF = ITF entry
- PR = Protected ranking
- SR = Special ranking
- SE = Special exempt
- JE = Junior exempt
- JR = Junior Accelerator Programme entrant
- CO = College Accelerator Programme entrant
- NG = Next Gen Accelerator Program entrant
- w/o = Walkover
- r = Retired
- d = Defaulted

=== Finals ===
Semifinals
(Serbia) Dušan Lajović	3	4
3	(Uruguay) Pablo Cuevas	6	6
(Spain) Íñigo Cervantes	1	1
(Spain) Pablo Carreño Busta	6	6

Final
3	(Uruguay) Pablo Cuevas	7^{7}	6
(Spain) Pablo Carreño Busta	6^{4}	3

=== Top half ===
First round
(Serbia) D Lajović	6	6
(Italy) L Vanni	2	2
(Colombia) S Giraldo	6	6
(Italy) M Cecchinato	2	2
Q	(Portugal) G Elias	1	6	0
8	(Spain) P Andújar	6	4	0^{r}
Q	(Argentina) F Bagnis	6	6
(France) P-H Mathieu	4	1
(Spain) D Muñoz de la Nava	6	4	6
Q	(Argentina) M González	3	6	2
WC	(Brazil) T Monteiro	6	7
7	(Spain) N Almagro	3	5

Second round
1/WC	(France) B Paire	0	6	3
(Serbia) D Lajović	6	4	6
(Colombia) S Giraldo	4	3
Q	(Portugal) G Elias	6	6
3	(Uruguay) P Cuevas	6	7
Q	(Argentina) F Bagnis	3	5
(Spain) D Muñoz de la Nava	6	3	2
WC	(Brazil) T Monteiro	4	6	6

Quarterfinals
(Serbia) D Lajović	6	4	6
Q	(Portugal) G Elias	3	6	0
3	(Uruguay) P Cuevas	4	6	6
WC	(Brazil) T Monteiro	6	3	3

Semifinals
(Serbia) D Lajović	3	4
3	(Uruguay) P Cuevas	6	6

=== Bottom half ===
First round
6	(Italy) P Lorenzi	6^{3}	6	6^{5}
Q	(Slovenia) B Rola	7^{7}	3	7^{7}
(Spain) M Granollers	3	4
(Spain) I Cervantes	6	6
(Argentina) H Zeballos	3	2^{r}
(Argentina) D Schwartzman	6	4
5	(Spain) A Ramos	6	4	6^{2}
(Spain) P Carreño Busta	0	6	7^{7}
(Spain) D Gimeno Traver	3	6	6
WC	(Brazil) G Clezar	6	4	1
(Japan) T Daniel	2	6^{4}
LL	(Spain) R Carballés Baena	6	7^{7}

Second round
Q	(Slovenia) B Rola	6^{4}	6^{1}
(Spain) I Cervantes	7^{7}	7^{7}
(Argentina) D Schwartzman	6	4	2
4	(Argentina) F Delbonis	3	6	6
(Spain) P Carreño Busta	6	3	6
(Spain) D Gimeno Traver	2	6	3
LL	(Spain) R Carballés Baena	2	6	6
2	(Brazil) T Bellucci	6	4	3

Quarterfinals
(Spain) I Cervantes	7^{8}	2	6
4	(Argentina) F Delbonis	6^{6}	6	4
(Spain) P Carreño Busta	6	6
LL	(Spain) R Carballés Baena	0	3

Semifinals
(Spain) I Cervantes	1	1
(Spain) P Carreño Busta	6	6

== Qualifying ==
=== Seeds ===
1. (Argentina) Facundo Bagnis (qualified)
2. (Brazil) Rogério Dutra Silva (first round)
3. (Spain) Roberto Carballés Baena (qualifying competition, lucky loser)
4. (Slovakia) Andrej Martin (first round)
5. (Argentina) Facundo Argüello (qualifying competition)
6. (Portugal) Gastão Elias (qualified)
7. (Slovenia) Blaž Rola (qualified)
8. (Argentina) Máximo González (qualified)

=== Qualifiers ===
1. (Argentina) Facundo Bagnis
2. (Portugal) Gastão Elias
3. (Argentina) Máximo González
4. (Slovenia) Blaž Rola

=== Lucky losers ===
1. (Spain) Roberto Carballés Baena

=== Qualifying draw ===
==== First qualifier ====
First round
1	(Argentina) Facundo Bagnis	5	6	6
(Argentina) Nicolás Kicker	7	4	2
WC	(Brazil) Orlando Luz	4	2
5	(Argentina) Facundo Argüello	6	6

Qualifying competition
1	(Argentina) Facundo Bagnis	6	6
5	(Argentina) Facundo Argüello	3	3

==== Second qualifier ====
First round
2	(Brazil) Rogério Dutra Silva	6	4	3
(Chile) Hans Podlipnik Castillo	3	6	6
WC	(Brazil) José Pereira	6	3	2
6	(Portugal) Gastão Elias	3	6	6

Qualifying competition
(Chile) Hans Podlipnik Castillo	6^{5}	7	2
6	(Portugal) Gastão Elias	7^{7}	5	6

==== Third qualifier ====
First round
3	(Spain) Roberto Carballés Baena	6	3	6
(Brazil) João Souza	4	6	3
(Italy) Filippo Volandri	2	6	5^{r}
8	(Argentina) Máximo González	6	4	5

Qualifying competition
3	(Spain) Roberto Carballés Baena	6	3	3
8	(Argentina) Máximo González	4	6	6

==== Fourth qualifier ====
First round
4	(Slovakia) Andrej Martin	5	2
Alt	(Italy) Gianluca Naso	7	6
(Brazil) André Ghem	6^{4}	6	6^{3}
7	(Slovenia) Blaž Rola	7^{7}	4	7^{7}

Qualifying competition
Alt	(Italy) Gianluca Naso	6	0	4
7	(Slovenia) Blaž Rola	3	6	6
