= 2016 Open Sud de France – Doubles =

Doubles
- 2016 Open Sud de France

Final
- Champions: (Croatia) Mate Pavić (New Zealand) Michael Venus
- Runners-up: (Germany) Alexander Zverev (Germany) Mischa Zverev
- Score: 7–5, 7–6^{(7–4)}

Details
- Draw: 16
- Seeds: 4

Events
Singles	Doubles
← 2015 ·	Open Sud de France	· 2017 →

Marcus Daniell and Artem Sitak were the defending champions but lost in the first round to Andrea Arnaboldi and Marc López.

Mate Pavić and Michael Venus won the title, defeating Alexander and Mischa Zverev in the final, 7–5, 7–6^{(7–4)}.

== Seeds ==
1. (Poland) Łukasz Kubot / (Poland) Marcin Matkowski (quarterfinals)
2. (Croatia) Mate Pavić / (New Zealand) Michael Venus (champions)
3. (Austria) Oliver Marach / (France) Fabrice Martin (first round)
4. (Israel) Jonathan Erlich / (United Kingdom) Colin Fleming (quarterfinals , withdrew)

== Draw ==
=== Key ===
- Q = Qualifier
- WC = Wild card
- LL = Lucky loser
- Alt = Alternate
- SE = Special exempt
- PR = Protected ranking
- ITF = ITF entry
- JE = Junior exempt
- w/o = Walkover
- r = Retired
- d = Defaulted
- SR = Special ranking

=== Draw ===
First round
1	(Poland) Ł Kubot (Poland) M Matkowski	4	7^{7}	[10]
WC	(France) P-H Mathieu (France) V Millot	6	6^{3}	[5]
PR	(Poland) T Bednarek (Uzbekistan) D Istomin	3	6	[6]
PR	(India) M Bhupathi (United Kingdom) J Marray	6	3	[10]
3	(Austria) O Marach (France) F Martin	6	3	[1]
(Croatia) B Ćorić (Croatia) A Sančić	3	6	[10]
(United Kingdom) K Skupski (United Kingdom) N Skupski	4	6^{6}
WC	(Germany) A Zverev (Germany) M Zverev	6	7^{8}
(Italy) A Arnaboldi (Spain) M López	4	6	[10]
(New Zealand) M Daniell (New Zealand) A Sitak	6	4	[5]
(Croatia) M Čilić (Croatia) N Mektić	1	3
4	(Israel) J Erlich (United Kingdom) C Fleming	6	6
(Sweden) J Brunström (South Africa) R Roelofse	6^{5}	7^{7}	[7]
(Poland) M Kowalczyk (Sweden) A Siljeström	7^{7}	6^{3}	[10]
(Germany) D Brown (Australia) R Junaid	3	4
2	(Croatia) M Pavić (New Zealand) M Venus	6	6

Quarterfinals
1	(Poland) Ł Kubot (Poland) M Matkowski	6^{2}	2
PR	(India) M Bhupathi (United Kingdom) J Marray	7^{7}	6
(Croatia) B Ćorić (Croatia) A Sančić	3	4
WC	(Germany) A Zverev (Germany) M Zverev	6	6
(Italy) A Arnaboldi (Spain) M López	w/o
4	(Israel) J Erlich (United Kingdom) C Fleming
(Poland) M Kowalczyk (Sweden) A Siljeström	6^{3}	3
2	(Croatia) M Pavić (New Zealand) M Venus	7^{7}	6

Semifinals
PR	(India) M Bhupathi (United Kingdom) J Marray	6	2	[3]
WC	(Germany) A Zverev (Germany) M Zverev	2	6	[10]
(Italy) A Arnaboldi (Spain) M López	3	7^{8}	[6]
2	(Croatia) M Pavić (New Zealand) M Venus	6	6^{6}	[10]

Final
WC	(Germany) A Zverev (Germany) M Zverev	5	6^{4}
2	(Croatia) M Pavić (New Zealand) M Venus	7^{7}	7
