= 2016 Brasil Open – Doubles =

Doubles
- 2016 Brasil Open

Final
- Champions: (Chile) Julio Peralta (Argentina) Horacio Zeballos
- Runners-up: (Spain) Pablo Carreño Busta (Spain) David Marrero
- Score: 4–6, 6–1, [10–5]

Details
- Draw: 16
- Seeds: 4

Events
Singles	Doubles
- Brasil Open

Juan Sebastián Cabal and Robert Farah were the defending champions, but chose to compete in Acapulco instead.

Julio Peralta and Horacio Zeballos won the title, defeating Pablo Carreño Busta and David Marrero in the final, 4–6, 6–1, [10–5].

== Seeds ==
1. (Brazil) Marcelo Melo / (Brazil) Bruno Soares (quarterfinals)
2. (Uruguay) Pablo Cuevas / (Spain) Marcel Granollers (withdrew)
3. (Argentina) Máximo González / (Brazil) André Sá (quarterfinals)
4. (United States) Nicholas Monroe / (Austria) Philipp Oswald (first round)

== Draw ==
Key

- Q = Qualifier
- WC = Wild card
- LL = Lucky loser
- Alt = Alternate
- ITF = ITF entry
- PR = Protected ranking
- SR = Special ranking
- SE = Special exempt
- JE = Junior exempt
- JR = Junior Accelerator Programme entrant
- CO = College Accelerator Programme entrant
- NG = Next Gen Accelerator Program entrant
- w/o = Walkover
- r = Retired
- d = Defaulted

=== Draw ===
First round
1	(Brazil) M Melo (Brazil) B Soares	6	6
WC	(Spain) N Almagro (Brazil) E Russi Assumpção	1	3
(Argentina) G Durán (Argentina) A Molteni	6	6
(Brazil) T Bellucci (Brazil) M Demoliner	4	2
4	(United States) N Monroe (Austria) P Oswald	5	2
WC	(Brazil) R Dutra Silva (Brazil) J Souza	7	6
(Chile) J Peralta (Argentina) H Zeballos	7^{7}	7
(Poland) M Kowalczyk (Sweden) A Siljeström	6^{3}	5
(Spain) P Carreño Busta (Spain) D Marrero	6	6
(Japan) T Daniel (Spain) D Gimeno-Traver	4	4
(Italy) M Cecchinato (Italy) P Lorenzi	6^{4}	1
3	(Argentina) M González (Brazil) A Sá	7^{7}	6
(Argentina) F Delbonis (Argentina) D Schwartzman	6	6
(Argentina) F Bagnis (Spain) I Cervantes	3	4
(Slovakia) A Martin (Chile) H Podlipnik	6	3	[10]
Alt	(Brazil) P Bernardi (Brazil) G Clezar	3	6	[2]

Quarterfinals
1	(Brazil) M Melo (Brazil) B Soares	1	6	[8]
(Argentina) G Durán (Argentina) A Molteni	6	2	[10]
WC	(Brazil) R Dutra Silva (Brazil) J Souza	4	3
(Chile) J Peralta (Argentina) H Zeballos	6	6
(Spain) P Carreño Busta (Spain) D Marrero	6	6
3	(Argentina) M González (Brazil) A Sá	3	4
(Argentina) F Delbonis (Argentina) D Schwartzman	4	5
(Slovakia) A Martin (Chile) H Podlipnik	6	7

Semifinals
(Argentina) G Durán (Argentina) A Molteni	1	4
(Chile) J Peralta (Argentina) H Zeballos	6	6
(Spain) P Carreño Busta (Spain) D Marrero	6	3	[10]
(Slovakia) A Martin (Chile) H Podlipnik	3	6	[6]

Final
(Chile) J Peralta (Argentina) H Zeballos	4	6	[10]
(Spain) P Carreño Busta (Spain) D Marrero	6	1	[5]
