= 2016 Open Sud de France – Singles =

Singles
- 2016 Open Sud de France

Final
- Champion: (France) Richard Gasquet
- Runner-up: (France) Paul-Henri Mathieu
- Score: 7–5, 6–4

Details
- Draw: 28
- Seeds: 8

Events
| Singles | Doubles |
- Open Sud de France

Richard Gasquet was the reigning champion and successfully defended his title, defeating Paul-Henri Mathieu in the final, 7–5, 6–4.

== Seeds ==
The top four seeds receive a bye into the second round.

1. (France) Richard Gasquet (champion)
2. (Croatia) Marin Čilić (second round)
3. (France) Gilles Simon (second round)
4. (France) Benoît Paire (second round)
5. (France) Gaël Monfils (first round)
6. (Portugal) João Sousa (first round)
7. (Croatia) Borna Ćorić (first round)
8. (Cyprus) Marcos Baghdatis (quarterfinals)

== Draw ==
Key

- Q = Qualifier
- WC = Wild card
- LL = Lucky loser
- Alt = Alternate
- ITF = ITF entry
- PR = Protected ranking
- SR = Special ranking
- SE = Special exempt
- JE = Junior exempt
- JR = Junior Accelerator Programme entrant
- CO = College Accelerator Programme entrant
- NG = Next Gen Accelerator Program entrant
- w/o = Walkover
- r = Retired
- d = Defaulted

=== Finals ===
Semifinals
1 | (France) Richard Gasquet | 1 | 6 | 6
Q | (Germany) Dustin Brown | 6 | 4 | 3
(France) Paul-Henri Mathieu | 7^{13} | 7
(Germany) Alexander Zverev | 6^{11} | 5

Final
1 | (France) Richard Gasquet | 7 | 6
(France) Paul-Henri Mathieu | 5 | 4

=== Top half ===
First round
(Latvia) E Gulbis | 6 | 6
WC | (France) Q Halys | 4 | 3
(Uzbekistan) D Istomin | 2 | 2
(Japan) T Daniel | 6 | 6
(Slovakia) L Lacko | 5 | 5
8/WC | (Cyprus) M Baghdatis | 7 | 7
(Belgium) S Darcis | 5 | 5
Q | (Germany) D Brown | 7 | 7
(France) N Mahut | 3 | 5
(Germany) J-L Struff | 6 | 7
(Belgium) R Bemelmans | 6 | 3 | 6
6 | (Portugal) J Sousa | 4 | 6 | 4

Second round
1 | (France) R Gasquet | 6 | 6
(Latvia) E Gulbis | 4 | 4
(Japan) T Daniel | 2 | 6^{7}
8/WC | (Cyprus) M Baghdatis | 6 | 7^{9}
3 | (France) G Simon | 4 | 4
Q | (Germany) D Brown | 6 | 6
(Germany) J-L Struff | 4 | 7^{7} | 3
(Belgium) R Bemelmans | 6 | 6^{5} | 6

Quarterfinals
1 | (France) R Gasquet | 6 | 6
8/WC | (Cyprus) M Baghdatis | 4 | 4
Q | (Germany) D Brown | 6 | 6
(Belgium) R Bemelmans | 3 | 3

Semifinals
1 | (France) R Gasquet | 1 | 6 | 6
Q | (Germany) D Brown | 6 | 4 | 3

=== Bottom half ===
First round
5 | (France) G Monfils | 4 | 6^{5}
Q | (France) É Roger-Vasselin | 6 | 7^{7}
WC | (France) J Benneteau | 3 | 0
(Australia) J Millman | 6 | 6
Q | (Sweden) E Ymer | 1 | 4
(France) P-H Mathieu | 6 | 6
7 | (Croatia) B Ćorić | 6^{5} | 2
(Germany) M Berrer | 7^{7} | 6
Q | (France) K de Schepper | 4 | 7^{7} | 6
(Georgia (country)) N Basilashvili | 6 | 6^{4} | 3
(Italy) L Vanni | 7^{7} | 4 | 5
(Germany) A Zverev | 6^{3} | 6 | 7

Second round
Q | (France) É Roger-Vasselin | 6 | 1 | 4
(Australia) J Millman | 4 | 6 | 6
(France) P-H Mathieu | 6 | 6
4 | (France) B Paire | 3 | 3
(Germany) M Berrer | 6 | 6
Q | (France) K de Schepper | 3 | 4
(Germany) A Zverev | 7^{7} | 7^{7}
2 | (Croatia) M Čilić | 6^{4} | 6^{1}

Quarterfinals
(Australia) J Millman | 6^{5} | 7 | 3
(France) P-H Mathieu | 7^{7} | 5 | 6
(Germany) M Berrer | 7^{7} | 2 | 5
(Germany) A Zverev | 6^{2} | 6 | 7

Semifinals
(France) P-H Mathieu | 7^{13} | 7
(Germany) A Zverev | 6^{11} | 5

== Qualifying ==
=== Seeds ===
1. (France) Édouard Roger-Vasselin (qualified)
2. (Belgium) Kimmer Coppejans (qualifying competition)
3. (Germany) Dustin Brown (qualified)
4. (Sweden) Elias Ymer (qualified)
5. (Czech Republic) Adam Pavlásek (first round)
6. (Netherlands) Igor Sijsling (qualifying competition)
7. (Russia) Karen Khachanov (qualifying competition)
8. (France) Kenny de Schepper (qualified)

=== Qualifiers ===
1. (France) Édouard Roger-Vasselin
2. (France) Kenny de Schepper
3. (Germany) Dustin Brown
4. (Sweden) Elias Ymer

=== Qualifying draw ===
==== First qualifier ====
First round
1 | (France) Édouard Roger-Vasselin | 6 | 6
(Italy) Andrea Arnaboldi | 2 | 4
(Russia) Alexander Kudryavtsev | 2 | 3
6 | (Netherlands) Igor Sijsling | 6 | 6

Qualifying competition
1 | (France) Édouard Roger-Vasselin | 7 | 3 | 6
6 | (Netherlands) Igor Sijsling | 5 | 6 | 3

==== Second qualifier ====
First round
2 | (Belgium) Kimmer Coppejans | 7 | 7
(Belarus) Egor Gerasimov | 5 | 5
WC | (France) Tristan Lamasine | 6 | 4 | 3
8 | (France) Kenny de Schepper | 3 | 6 | 6

Qualifying competition
2 | (Belgium) Kimmer Coppejans | 3 | 3
8 | (France) Kenny de Schepper | 6 | 6

==== Third qualifier ====
First round
3 | (Germany) Dustin Brown | 3 | 7^{7} | 6
(Germany) Mischa Zverev | 6 | 6^{5} | 4
(France) David Guez | 7 | 6
5 | (Czech Republic) Adam Pavlásek | 5 | 3

Qualifying competition
3 | (Germany) Dustin Brown | 1 | 6 | 6
(France) David Guez | 6 | 2 | 1

==== Fourth qualifier ====
First round
4 | (Sweden) Elias Ymer | 6 | 6
WC | (France) Maxime Janvier | 3 | 3
(France) Vincent Millot | 6^{4} | 6 | 4
7 | (Russia) Karen Khachanov | 7^{7} | 4 | 6

Qualifying competition
4 | (Sweden) Elias Ymer | 4 | 6 | 6
7 | (Russia) Karen Khachanov | 6 | 4 | 2
