= 2016 Open 13 Provence – Singles =

Singles
- 2016 Open 13 Provence

Final
- Champion: (Australia) Nick Kyrgios
- Runner-up: (Croatia) Marin Čilić
- Score: 6–2, 7–6^{(7–3)}

Details
- Draw: 28 (4 Q / 3 WC )
- Seeds: 8

Events
Singles	Doubles
← 2015 ·	Open 13	· 2017 →

Gilles Simon was the defending champion, but lost in the first round to Teymuraz Gabashvili.

Nick Kyrgios won his first ATP title, defeating Marin Čilić in the final, 6–2, 7–6^{(7–3)}.

== Seeds ==
The top four seeds receive a bye into the second round.

1. (Switzerland) Stan Wawrinka (quarterfinals)
2. (Czech Republic) Tomáš Berdych (semifinals)
3. (France) Richard Gasquet (quarterfinals)
4. (Croatia) Marin Čilić (final)
5. (France) Gilles Simon (first round)
6. (Belgium) David Goffin (quarterfinals)
7. (France) Gaël Monfils (withdrew)
8. (France) Benoît Paire (semifinals)

== Draw ==
=== Key ===
- Q = Qualifier
- WC = Wild card
- LL = Lucky loser
- Alt = Alternate
- SE = Special exempt
- PR = Protected ranking
- ITF = ITF entry
- JE = Junior exempt
- w/o = Walkover
- r = Retired
- d = Defaulted
- SR = Special ranking

=== Finals ===
Semifinals
8	(France) Benoît Paire	2	7^{7}	3
4	(Croatia) Marin Čilić	6	6^{3}	6
(Australia) Nick Kyrgios	6	6
2	(Czech Republic) Tomáš Berdych	4	2

Final
4	(Croatia) Marin Čilić	2	6^{3}
(Australia) Nick Kyrgios	6	7^{7}

=== Top half ===
First round
(Spain) F López	3	6	6^{5}
(Ukraine) S Stakhovsky	6	2	7^{7}
(France) N Mahut	7^{7}	2	3
Q	(France) V Millot	6^{1}	6	6
(Italy) S Bolelli	4	5
8	(France) B Paire	6	7
(Netherlands) R Haase	6	6
(Portugal) J Sousa	4	0
(France) L Pouille	6^{1}	4
(Russia) A Kuznetsov	7^{7}	6
WC	(France) Q Halys	6^{5}	6	6
LL	(France) D Guez	7^{7}	2	3

Second round
1	(Switzerland) S Wawrinka	6	4	7^{10}
(Ukraine) S Stakhovsky	4	6	6^{8}
Q	(France) V Millot	3	6	3
8	(France) B Paire	6	1	6
4	(Croatia) M Čilić	4	6	7
(Netherlands) R Haase	6	3	5
(Russia) A Kuznetsov	6	6
WC	(France) Q Halys	0	4

Quarterfinals
1	(Switzerland) S Wawrinka	4	6	5
8	(France) B Paire	6	1	7
4	(Croatia) M Čilić	6	6
(Russia) A Kuznetsov	3	4

Semifinals
8	(France) B Paire	2	7^{7}	3
4	(Croatia) M Čilić	6	6^{3}	6

=== Bottom half ===
First round
5	(France) G Simon	6	3	6^{7}
(Russia) T Gabashvili	3	6	7^{9}
(Australia) N Kyrgios	6	6
(Canada) V Pospisil	4	4
Q	(France) K de Schepper	4	7^{8}	6^{2}
(Latvia) E Gulbis	6	6^{6}	7^{7}
6	(Belgium) D Goffin	6	6
(South Korea) H Chung	3	1
Q	(Germany) M Zverev	6	7
WC	(India) R Ramanathan	2	5
Q	(France) J Benneteau	6^{4}	5
WC	(Germany) A Zverev	7^{7}	7

Second round
(Russia) T Gabashvili	4	4
(Australia) N Kyrgios	6	6
(Latvia) E Gulbis	6^{5}	3
3	(France) R Gasquet	7^{7}	6
6	(Belgium) D Goffin	6	2
Q	(Germany) M Zverev	1	0^{r}
WC	(Germany) A Zverev	3	6	5
2	(Czech Republic) T Berdych	6	3	7

Quarterfinals
(Australia) N Kyrgios	6	6
3	(France) R Gasquet	0	4
6	(Belgium) D Goffin	3	4
2	(Czech Republic) T Berdych	6	6

Semifinals
(Australia) N Kyrgios	6	6
2	(Czech Republic) T Berdych	4	2

== Qualifying ==
=== Seeds ===
1. (Turkey) Marsel İlhan (qualifying competition)
2. (Belgium) Ruben Bemelmans (first round)
3. (Germany) Daniel Brands (first round)
4. (France) Édouard Roger-Vasselin (first round)
5. (Japan) Go Soeda (first round)
6. (Italy) Thomas Fabbiano (first round)
7. (Russia) Karen Khachanov (first round)
8. (France) Kenny de Schepper (qualified)

=== Qualifiers ===
1. (Germany) Mischa Zverev
2. (France) Vincent Millot
3. (France) Kenny de Schepper
4. (France) Julien Benneteau

=== Lucky loser ===
1. (France) David Guez

=== Qualifying draw ===
==== First qualifier ====
First round
1	(Turkey) Marsel İlhan	6	6
WC	(France) Clément Larrière	4	2
(Germany) Mischa Zverev	7	3	6
7	(Russia) Karen Khachanov	5	6	1

Qualifying competition
1	(Turkey) Marsel İlhan	3	1
(Germany) Mischa Zverev	6	6

==== Second qualifier ====
First round
2	(Belgium) Ruben Bemelmans	0	6	4
(France) Vincent Millot	6	3	6
(France) David Guez	6	4	6
5	(Japan) Go Soeda	3	6	1

Qualifying competition
(France) Vincent Millot	7	6^{5}	6
(France) David Guez	5	7^{7}	1

==== Third qualifier ====
First round
3	(Germany) Daniel Brands	5	6^{5}
Alt	(Germany) Peter Gojowczyk	7	7^{7}
(Hungary) Márton Fucsovics	4	4
8	(France) Kenny de Schepper	6	6

Qualifying competition
Alt	(Germany) Peter Gojowczyk	6^{0}	6	4
8	(France) Kenny de Schepper	7^{7}	4	6

==== Fourth qualifier ====
First round
4	(France) Édouard Roger-Vasselin	6^{1}	6^{4}
(France) Tristan Lamasine	7^{7}	7^{7}
WC	(France) Julien Benneteau	6	6
6	(Italy) Thomas Fabbiano	1	1

Qualifying competition
(France) Tristan Lamasine	4	4
WC	(France) Julien Benneteau	6	6
