= 2016 St. Petersburg Open – Doubles =

Doubles
- 2016 St. Petersburg Open

Final
- Champions: (United Kingdom) Dominic Inglot (Finland) Henri Kontinen
- Runners-up: (Germany) Andre Begemann (India) Leander Paes
- Score: 4–6, 6–3, [12–10]

Events
Singles	Doubles
← 2015 ·	St. Petersburg Open	· 2017 →

Treat Huey and Henri Kontinen were the defending champions, but Huey chose not to participate this year. Kontinen played alongside Dominic Inglot and successfully defended the title, defeating Andre Begemann and Leander Paes in the final, 4–6, 6–3, [12–10].

== Seeds ==
1. (United Kingdom) Dominic Inglot / (Finland) Henri Kontinen (champions)
2. (Poland) Marcin Matkowski / (Serbia) Nenad Zimonjić (quarterfinals)
3. (Netherlands) Wesley Koolhof / (Netherlands) Matwé Middelkoop (first round)
4. (Argentina) Andrés Molteni / (Chile) Hans Podlipnik-Castillo (first round)

== Draw ==
=== Key ===
- Q = Qualifier
- WC = Wild card
- LL = Lucky loser
- Alt = Alternate
- SE = Special exempt
- PR = Protected ranking
- ITF = ITF entry
- JE = Junior exempt
- w/o = Walkover
- r = Retired
- d = Defaulted
- SR = Special ranking

=== Draw ===
First round
1	(United Kingdom) D Inglot (Finland) H Kontinen	6^{7}	7^{7}	[10]
(Argentina) G Durán (Poland) M Fyrstenberg	7^{9}	6^{2}	[6]
(Italy) P Lorenzi (France) A Mannarino	4
(United Kingdom) J Marray (Canada) A Shamasdin	2^{r}
3	(Netherlands) W Koolhof (Netherlands) M Middelkoop	7	4	[5]
(Russia) K Kravchuk (Russia) A Kuznetsov	5	6	[10]
WC	(Russia) A Bublik (Russia) E Donskoy	6	3	[7]
Alt	(Russia) K Khachanov (Czech Republic) L Rosol	3	6	[10]
PR	(Serbia) J Tipsarević (Serbia) V Troicki	2	4
PR	(Germany) A Begemann (India) L Paes	6	6
(India) P Raja (India) D Sharan	6	6
4	(Argentina) A Molteni (Chile) H Podlipnik-Castillo	4	4
(Russia) T Gabashvili (Spain) A Ramos-Viñolas	5	5
WC	(Russia) M Elgin (Russia) A Kudryavtsev	7	7
(Lithuania) R Berankis (Portugal) G Elias	6	3	[4]
2	(Poland) M Matkowski (Serbia) N Zimonjić	4	6	[10]

Quarterfinals
1	(United Kingdom) D Inglot (Finland) H Kontinen	6^{5}	6	[10]
(Italy) P Lorenzi (France) A Mannarino	7^{7}	1	[7]
(Russia) K Kravchuk (Russia) A Kuznetsov	6	7^{8}
Alt	(Russia) K Khachanov (Czech Republic) L Rosol	4	6^{6}
PR	(Germany) A Begemann (India) L Paes	6	7
(India) P Raja (India) D Sharan	3	5
WC	(Russia) M Elgin (Russia) A Kudryavtsev	7^{7}	7
2	(Poland) M Matkowski (Serbia) N Zimonjić	6^{4}	5

Semifinals
1	(United Kingdom) D Inglot (Finland) H Kontinen	6	6
(Russia) K Kravchuk (Russia) A Kuznetsov	3	0
PR	(Germany) A Begemann (India) L Paes	6	7^{7}
WC	(Russia) M Elgin (Russia) A Kudryavtsev	3	6^{5}

Final
1	(United Kingdom) D Inglot (Finland) H Kontinen	4	6	[12]
PR	(Germany) A Begemann (India) L Paes	6	3	[10]
