= 2017 Stockholm Open =

- Date: 16–22 October
- Edition: 49th
- Category: ATP World Tour 250 series
- Draw: 28S / 16D
- Prize money: €589,185
- Surface: Hard / Indoor
- Location: Stockholm, Sweden
- Venue: Kungliga tennishallen

Champions

Singles
- (Argentina) Juan Martín del Potro

Doubles
- (Austria) Oliver Marach / (Croatia) Mate Pavić
← 2016 ·	Stockholm Open	· 2018 →

The 2017 Stockholm Open (also known as the Intrum Stockholm Open for sponsorship purposes) was a professional men's tennis tournament played on indoor hard courts. It was the 49th edition of the tournament, and part of the ATP World Tour 250 series of the 2017 ATP World Tour. It took place at the Kungliga tennishallen in Stockholm, Sweden from 16 October until 22 October 2017. Fourth-seeded Juan Martín del Potro won the singles title.

== Finals ==
=== Singles ===
- (Argentina) Juan Martín del Potro defeated (Bulgaria) Grigor Dimitrov 6–4, 6–2.

=== Doubles ===
- (Austria) Oliver Marach / (Croatia) Mate Pavić defeated (Pakistan) Aisam-ul-Haq Qureshi / (Netherlands) Jean-Julien Rojer, 3−6, 7−6^{(8−6)}, [10−4]

== Singles main-draw entrants ==
=== Seeds ===
Country	Player	Rank^{1}	Seed
BUL	Grigor Dimitrov	8	1
RSA	Kevin Anderson	16	2
USA	Jack Sock	21	3
ARG	Juan Martín del Potro	23	4
GER	Mischa Zverev	27	5
ITA	Fabio Fognini	28	6
JPN	Yūichi Sugita	36	7
ESP	Fernando Verdasco	43	8

- ^{1} Rankings are as of October 16, 2017

=== Other entrants ===
The following players received wildcards into the singles main draw:

- (Sweden) Elias Ymer
- (Sweden) Mikael Ymer
- (Germany) Mischa Zverev

The following players received entry from the qualifying draw:

- (Italy) Simone Bolelli
- (Hungary) Márton Fucsovics
- (Poland) Jerzy Janowicz
- (Slovakia) Lukáš Lacko

The following player received entry as a lucky loser:

- (Estonia) Jürgen Zopp

=== Withdrawals ===
Before the tournament

- (Spain) Nicolás Almagro →replaced by (Estonia) Jürgen Zopp
- (Australia) John Millman →replaced by (Romania) Marius Copil

== Doubles main-draw entrants ==
=== Seeds ===
Country	Player	Country	Player	Rank^{1}	Seed
AUT	Oliver Marach	CRO	Mate Pavić	37	1
PAK	Aisam-ul-Haq Qureshi	NED	Jean-Julien Rojer	41	2
USA	Jack Sock	SRB	Nenad Zimonjić	64	3
AUT	Alexander Peya	BRA	Bruno Soares	64	4

- Rankings are as of October 9, 2017

=== Other entrants ===
The following pairs received wildcards into the doubles main draw:

- (France) Jérémy Chardy / (Sweden) Robert Lindstedt
- (Sweden) Elias Ymer / (Sweden) Mikael Ymer
