= 2019 Stockholm Open – Singles =

Singles
- 2019 Stockholm Open

Final
- Champion: (Canada) Denis Shapovalov
- Runner-up: (Serbia) Filip Krajinović
- Score: 6–4, 6–4

Details
- Draw: 28
- Seeds: 8

Events
Singles	Doubles
- Stockholm Open

Stefanos Tsitsipas was the defending champion, but chose not to defend his title.

Denis Shapovalov won his first ATP Tour singles title, defeating Filip Krajinović in the final, 6–4, 6–4.

Former world No. 8 Janko Tipsarević played his last ATP match at the tournament losing in the quarterfinals to Yūichi Sugita.

== Seeds ==
The top four seeds receive a bye into the second round.

1. (Italy) Fabio Fognini (second round)
2. (Bulgaria) Grigor Dimitrov (second round)
3. (United States) Taylor Fritz (second round)
4. (Canada) Denis Shapovalov (champion)
5. (Spain) Pablo Carreño Busta (semifinals)
6. (United States) Reilly Opelka (first round)
7. (Spain) Fernando Verdasco (withdrew)
8. (United Kingdom) Dan Evans (second round)

== Draw ==
Key

- Q = Qualifier
- WC = Wild card
- LL = Lucky loser
- Alt = Alternate
- ITF = ITF entry
- PR = Protected ranking
- SR = Special ranking
- SE = Special exempt
- JE = Junior exempt
- JR = Junior Accelerator Programme entrant
- CO = College Accelerator Programme entrant
- NG = Next Gen Accelerator Program entrant
- w/o = Walkover
- r = Retired
- d = Defaulted

=== Finals ===
Semifinals
LL	(Japan) Yūichi Sugita	5	2
4	(Canada) Denis Shapovalov	7	6
(Serbia) Filip Krajinović	4	6	6
5	(Spain) Pablo Carreño Busta	6	3	3

Final
4	(Canada) Denis Shapovalov	6	6
(Serbia) Filip Krajinović	4	4

=== Top half ===
First round
PR	(Serbia) J Tipsarević	6	6
(France) C Moutet	2	4
WC	(Sweden) E Ymer	6^{6}	2
LL	(Japan) Y Sugita	7^{8}	6
(Italy) S Travaglia	7	4	6
6	(United States) R Opelka	5	6	4
LL	(Germany) O Otte	6^{6}	6^{5}
Q	(Australia) A Popyrin	7^{8}	7^{7}
WC	(Sweden) M Ymer	7	6
(Portugal) J Sousa	5	4
(Canada) B Schnur	2	6	1
Q	(Germany) C-M Stebe	6	3	6

Second round
1	(Italy) F Fognini	1	1
PR	(Serbia) J Tipsarević	6	6
LL	(Japan) Y Sugita	7^{8}	6
(Italy) S Travaglia	6^{6}	4
4	(Canada) D Shapovalov	6	7^{7}
Q	(Australia) A Popyrin	4	6^{3}
WC	(Sweden) M Ymer	0	6^{5}
Q	(Germany) C-M Stebe	6	7^{7}

Quarterfinals
PR	(Serbia) J Tipsarević	2	6	6^{4}
LL	(Japan) Y Sugita	6	4	7^{7}
4	(Canada) D Shapovalov	6	6
Q	(Germany) C-M Stebe	0	3

Semifinals
LL	(Japan) Y Sugita	5	2
4	(Canada) D Shapovalov	7	6

=== Bottom half ===
First round
8	(United Kingdom) D Evans	6	1	6
(Australia) B Tomic	4	6	3
(Serbia) F Krajinović	6	7
(Norway) C Ruud	3	5
(Moldova) R Albot	6	4	1
(Japan) Y Nishioka	3	6	6
5	(Spain) P Carreño Busta	6	6
(Australia) J Millman	4	3
LL	(Italy) G Mager	5	6	6
(Spain) P Andújar	7	1	1
(United States) S Querrey	7^{8}	6
Q	(Austria) D Novak	6^{6}	4

Second round
8	(United Kingdom) D Evans	5	6	3
(Serbia) F Krajinović	7	2	6
(Japan) Y Nishioka	7	6
3	(United States) T Fritz	5	4
5	(Spain) P Carreño Busta	6	7^{7}
LL	(Italy) G Mager	3	6^{2}
(United States) S Querrey	6^{7}	6	7^{7}
2/WC	(Bulgaria) G Dimitrov	7^{9}	3	6^{3}

Quarterfinals
(Serbia) F Krajinović	6	6
(Japan) Y Nishioka	3	4
5	(Spain) P Carreño Busta	4	6	6
(United States) S Querrey	6	1	4

Semifinals
(Serbia) F Krajinović	4	6	6
5	(Spain) P Carreño Busta	6	3	3

== Qualifying ==
=== Seeds ===
1. (United States) Tommy Paul (qualified)
2. (Australia) Alexei Popyrin (qualified)
3. (South Korea) Chung Hyeon (first round)
4. (Italy) Gianluca Mager (qualifying competition, lucky loser)
5. (Austria) Dennis Novak (qualified)
6. (Japan) Yūichi Sugita (qualifying competition, lucky loser)
7. (Latvia) Ernests Gulbis (first round, retired)
8. (Germany) Oscar Otte (qualifying competition, lucky loser)

=== Qualifiers ===
1. (United States) ~~Tommy Paul~~
2. (Australia) Alexei Popyrin
3. (Germany) Cedrik-Marcel Stebe
4. (Austria) Dennis Novak

=== Lucky losers ===
1. (Germany) Oscar Otte
2. (Japan) Yūichi Sugita
3. (Italy) Gianluca Mager

=== Qualifying draw ===
==== First qualifier ====
First round
1	(United States) Tommy Paul	6	6
Alt	(Sweden) Markus Eriksson	1	1
WC	(Sweden) Lucas Renard	7	0
7	(Latvia) Ernests Gulbis	5	0^{r}

Qualifying competition
1	(United States) Tommy Paul	6	6
WC	(Sweden) Lucas Renard	4	3

==== Second qualifier ====
First round
2	(Australia) Alexei Popyrin	7	7^{7}
(Germany) Tobias Kamke	5	6^{1}
(France) Enzo Couacaud	2	4
6	(Japan) Yūichi Sugita	6	6

Qualifying competition
2	(Australia) Alexei Popyrin	1	6	6
6	(Japan) Yūichi Sugita	6	2	3

==== Third qualifier ====
First round
3	(South Korea) Chung Hyeon	6	3	3
(Germany) Cedrik-Marcel Stebe	3	6	6
(Spain) Tommy Robredo	0	6	1
8	(Germany) Oscar Otte	6	4	6

Qualifying competition
(Germany) Cedrik-Marcel Stebe	6	4	6
8	(Germany) Oscar Otte	4	6	1

==== Fourth qualifier ====
First round
4	(Italy) Gianluca Mager	6	7
WC	(Sweden) Simon Yitbarek	2	5
(Serbia) Viktor Troicki	5	1
5	(Austria) Dennis Novak	7	6

Qualifying competition
4	(Italy) Gianluca Mager	1	5
5	(Austria) Dennis Novak	6	7
