= 2017 Stockholm Open – Doubles =

Doubles
- 2017 Stockholm Open

Final
- Champions: (Austria) Oliver Marach (Croatia) Mate Pavić
- Runners-up: (Pakistan) Aisam-ul-Haq Qureshi (Netherlands) Jean-Julien Rojer
- Score: 3−6, 7−6^{(8−6)}, [10−4]

Events
Singles	Doubles
← 2016 ·	Stockholm Open	· 2018 →

Elias and Mikael Ymer were the defending champions, but lost in the first round to Marc López and Fernando Verdasco.

Oliver Marach and Mate Pavić won the title, defeating Aisam-ul-Haq Qureshi and Jean-Julien Rojer in the final, 3−6, 7−6^{(8−6)}, [10−4].

== Seeds ==
1. (Austria) Oliver Marach / (Croatia) Mate Pavić (champions)
2. (Pakistan) Aisam-ul-Haq Qureshi / (Netherlands) Jean-Julien Rojer (final)
3. (United States) Jack Sock / (Serbia) Nenad Zimonjić (semifinals)
4. (Austria) Alexander Peya / (Brazil) Bruno Soares (semifinals)

== Draw ==
=== Key ===
- Q = Qualifier
- WC = Wild card
- LL = Lucky loser
- Alt = Alternate
- SE = Special exempt
- PR = Protected ranking
- ITF = ITF entry
- JE = Junior exempt
- w/o = Walkover
- r = Retired
- d = Defaulted
- SR = Special ranking

=== Draw ===
First round
1	(Austria) O Marach (Croatia) M Pavić	6	6
(France) J Eysseric (Croatia) F Škugor	3	4
(Israel) J Erlich (Croatia) N Mektić	5	7^{7}	[10]
(Romania) M Copil (Romania) F Mergea	7	6^{3}	[8]
4	(Austria) A Peya (Brazil) B Soares	7^{7}	6
(Spain) D Marrero (Argentina) L Mayer	6^{5}	3
(Netherlands) R Haase (New Zealand) M Venus	6	6
(New Zealand) M Daniell (Brazil) M Demoliner	2	4
WC	(Sweden) E Ymer (Sweden) M Ymer	4	0
(Spain) M López (Spain) F Verdasco	6	6
(India) L Paes (India) P Raja	6	6^{3}	[8]
3	(United States) J Sock (Serbia) N Zimonjić	3	7^{7}	[10]
WC	(France) J Chardy (Sweden) R Lindstedt	3	1
PR	(Italy) S Bolelli (Italy) F Fognini	6	6
(United States) N Monroe (Australia) J-P Smith	0	6^{4}
2	(Pakistan) A-u-H Qureshi (Netherlands) J-J Rojer	6	7^{7}

Quarterfinals
1	(Austria) O Marach (Croatia) M Pavić	6	4	[10]
(Israel) J Erlich (Croatia) N Mektić	3	6	[5]
4	(Austria) A Peya (Brazil) B Soares	7^{11}	7
(Netherlands) R Haase (New Zealand) M Venus	6^{9}	5
(Spain) M López (Spain) F Verdasco	2	6^{7}
3	(United States) J Sock (Serbia) N Zimonjić	6	7^{9}
PR	(Italy) S Bolelli (Italy) F Fognini	5	5
2	(Pakistan) A-u-H Qureshi (Netherlands) J-J Rojer	7	7

Semifinals
1	(Austria) O Marach (Croatia) M Pavić	3	7^{7}	[10]
4	(Austria) A Peya (Brazil) B Soares	6	6^{3}	[8]
3	(United States) J Sock (Serbia) N Zimonjić	7^{7}	4	[6]
2	(Pakistan) A-u-H Qureshi (Netherlands) J-J Rojer	6^{3}	6	[10]

Final
1	(Austria) O Marach (Croatia) M Pavić	3	7^{8}	[10]
2	(Pakistan) A-u-H Qureshi (Netherlands) J-J Rojer	6	6^{6}	[4]
