= 2018 Stockholm Open – Singles =

Singles
- 2018 Stockholm Open

Final
- Champion: (Greece) Stefanos Tsitsipas
- Runner-up: (Latvia) Ernests Gulbis
- Score: 6–4, 6–4

Details
- Draw: 28
- Seeds: 8

Events
Singles	Doubles
- Stockholm Open

Juan Martín del Potro was the two-time defending champion but chose not to defend his title.

Stefanos Tsitsipas won his first ATP World Tour title, defeating Ernests Gulbis in the final, 6–4, 6–4. With the win, he became the first Greek player to win an ATP title in the organization's 48-year history. Gulbis lost his first ATP Tour final, after six singles titles in a row.

== Seeds ==
The top four seeds receive a bye into the second round.

1. (United States) John Isner (semifinals)
2. (Italy) Fabio Fognini (semifinals)
3. (Greece) Stefanos Tsitsipas (champion)
4. (United States) Jack Sock (quarterfinals)
5. (France) Lucas Pouille (first round)
6. (South Korea) Chung Hyeon (quarterfinals, retired)
7. (Canada) Denis Shapovalov (second round)
8. (Spain) Fernando Verdasco (second round)

== Draw ==
Key

- Q = Qualifier
- WC = Wild card
- LL = Lucky loser
- Alt = Alternate
- ITF = ITF entry
- PR = Protected ranking
- SR = Special ranking
- SE = Special exempt
- JE = Junior exempt
- JR = Junior Accelerator Programme entrant
- CO = College Accelerator Programme entrant
- NG = Next Gen Accelerator Program entrant
- w/o = Walkover
- r = Retired
- d = Defaulted

=== Finals ===
Semifinals
1	(United States) John Isner	6	3	3
Q	(Latvia) Ernests Gulbis	1	6	6
3	(Greece) Stefanos Tsitsipas	6	6
2	(Italy) Fabio Fognini	3	2

Final
Q	(Latvia) Ernests Gulbis	4	4
3	(Greece) Stefanos Tsitsipas	6	6

=== Top half ===
First round
(United States) B Klahn	6	3	6
(Romania) M Copil	2	6	4
Q	(Germany) O Otte	6	7
LL	(Estonia) J Zopp	3	5
(United States) T Sandgren	6	6
5	(France) L Pouille	4	4
WC	(Sweden) E Ymer	4	7	7
(Germany) M Marterer	6	5	5
WC	(Sweden) M Ymer	4	3
Q	(Latvia) E Gulbis	6	6
Q	(Canada) P Polansky	3	7	5
7	(Canada) D Shapovalov	6	5	7

Second round
1	(United States) J Isner	7^{7}	6^{5}	7^{7}
(United States) B Klahn	6^{2}	7^{7}	6^{5}
Q	(Germany) O Otte	6^{4}	6	3
(United States) T Sandgren	7^{7}	3	6
4	(United States) J Sock	7	3	6
WC	(Sweden) E Ymer	5	6	3
Q	(Latvia) E Gulbis	6	6
7	(Canada) D Shapovalov	2	4

Quarterfinals
1	(United States) J Isner	7^{10}	6^{5}	7^{7}
(United States) T Sandgren	6^{8}	7^{7}	6^{2}
4	(United States) J Sock	6	3	4
Q	(Latvia) E Gulbis	4	6	6

Semifinals
1	(United States) J Isner	6	3	3
Q	(Latvia) E Gulbis	1	6	6

=== Bottom half ===
First round
8	(Spain) F Verdasco	6	6
(Australia) M Ebden	4	2
(Australia) A de Minaur	6^{3}	7^{7}	1
(Germany) P Kohlschreiber	7^{7}	6^{2}	6
(Australia) J Millman	4	6	6
Q	(Australia) A Popyrin	6	3	2
6/WC	(South Korea) H Chung	6	6
(United States) T Fritz	2	2
(United States) D Kudla	6	7
(Spain) G García López	2	5
(Slovakia) L Lacko	6	6
(Japan) T Daniel	1	4

Second round
8	(Spain) F Verdasco	6	5	6^{5}
(Germany) P Kohlschreiber	4	7	7^{7}
(Australia) J Millman	4	6	3
3	(Greece) S Tsitsipas	6	3	6
6/WC	(South Korea) H Chung	6	6
(United States) D Kudla	3	3
(Slovakia) L Lacko	4	4
2	(Italy) F Fognini	6	6

Quarterfinals
(Germany) P Kohlschreiber	3	6^{4}
3	(Greece) S Tsitsipas	6	7^{7}
6/WC	(South Korea) H Chung	5	1^{r}
2	(Italy) F Fognini	7	2

Semifinals
3	(Greece) S Tsitsipas	6	6
2	(Italy) F Fognini	3	2

== Qualifying ==
=== Seeds ===
1. (France) Julien Benneteau (qualifying competition)
2. (Australia) Bernard Tomic (first round, retired)
3. (United States) Michael Mmoh (first round)
4. (Canada) Peter Polansky (qualified)
5. (Estonia) Jürgen Zopp (qualifying competition, lucky loser)
6. (Germany) Matthias Bachinger (qualifying competition)
7. (Latvia) Ernests Gulbis (qualified)
8. (Germany) Mats Moraing (first round)

=== Qualifiers ===
1. (Latvia) Ernests Gulbis
2. (Germany) Oscar Otte
3. (Australia) Alexei Popyrin
4. (Canada) Peter Polansky

=== Lucky loser ===
1. (Estonia) Jürgen Zopp

=== Qualifying draw ===
==== First qualifier ====
First round
1	(France) Julien Benneteau	6	6
(Russia) Ivan Nedelko	4	2
WC	(Sweden) Markus Eriksson	4	6^{1}
7	(Latvia) Ernests Gulbis	6	7^{7}

Qualifying competition
1	(France) Julien Benneteau	1	4
7	(Latvia) Ernests Gulbis	6	6

==== Second qualifier ====
First round
2	(Australia) Bernard Tomic	4	2^{r}
(Germany) Oscar Otte	6	1
(Italy) Matteo Donati	4	4
5	(Estonia) Jürgen Zopp	6	6

Qualifying competition
(Germany) Oscar Otte	6	7^{7}
5	(Estonia) Jürgen Zopp	3	6^{2}

==== Third qualifier ====
First round
3	(United States) Michael Mmoh	6^{5}	6^{7}
(Australia) Alexei Popyrin	7^{7}	7^{9}
(Slovakia) Norbert Gombos	3	4
6	(Germany) Matthias Bachinger	6	6

Qualifying competition
(Australia) Alexei Popyrin	6	4	6
6	(Germany) Matthias Bachinger	3	6	2

==== Fourth qualifier ====
First round
4	(Canada) Peter Polansky	6	6
WC	(Sweden) Karl Friberg	4	1
(Italy) Andrea Arnaboldi	7	6
8	(Germany) Mats Moraing	5	2

Qualifying competition
4	(Canada) Peter Polansky	6	1	6
(Italy) Andrea Arnaboldi	4	6	4
