= 2019 Stockholm Open =

- Date: 14–20 October
- Edition: 51st
- Category: ATP Tour 250 series
- Draw: 28S / 16D
- Prize money: €635,750
- Surface: Hard / indoor
- Location: Stockholm, Sweden
- Venue: Kungliga tennishallen

Champions

Singles
- (Canada) Denis Shapovalov

Doubles
- (Finland) Henri Kontinen / (France) Édouard Roger-Vasselin
- Stockholm Open

The 2019 Intrum Stockholm Open was a professional men's tennis tournament played on indoor hard courts. It was the 51st edition of the tournament, and part of the ATP Tour 250 series of the 2019 ATP Tour. It took place at the Kungliga tennishallen in Stockholm, Sweden from 14 October until 20 October 2019. Fourth-seeded Denis Shapovalov won the singles title.

== Finals ==
=== Singles ===
- (Canada) Denis Shapovalov defeated (Serbia) Filip Krajinović, 6–4, 6–4

=== Doubles ===
- (Finland) Henri Kontinen / (France) Édouard Roger-Vasselin defeated (Croatia) Mate Pavić / (Brazil) Bruno Soares, 6–4, 6–2

== Singles main-draw entrants ==
=== Seeds ===
Country	Player	Rank^{1}	Seed
ITA	Fabio Fognini	12	1
BUL	Grigor Dimitrov	27	2
USA	Taylor Fritz	29	3
CAN	Denis Shapovalov	36	4
ESP	Pablo Carreño Busta	37	5
USA	Reilly Opelka	40	6
~~ESP~~	~~Fernando Verdasco~~	~~41~~	~~7~~
GBR	Dan Evans	43	8

- ^{1} Rankings are as of October 7, 2019

=== Other entrants ===
The following players received wildcards into the singles main draw:

- (Bulgaria) Grigor Dimitrov
- (Sweden) Elias Ymer
- (Sweden) Mikael Ymer

The following player received entry using a protected ranking into the singles main draw:

- (Serbia) Janko Tipsarević

The following players received entry from the qualifying draw:

- (Austria) Dennis Novak
- (United States) ~~Tommy Paul~~
- (Australia) Alexei Popyrin
- (Germany) Cedrik-Marcel Stebe

The following players received entry as lucky losers:

- (Italy) Gianluca Mager
- (Germany) Oscar Otte
- (Japan) Yūichi Sugita

=== Withdrawals ===
Before the tournament

- (Italy) Marco Cecchinato → replaced by (Italy) Stefano Travaglia
- (Hungary) Márton Fucsovics → replaced by (Germany) Oscar Otte
- (United States) Tommy Paul → replaced by (Italy) Gianluca Mager
- (Argentina) Juan Martín del Potro → replaced by (Serbia) Janko Tipsarević
- (France) Lucas Pouille → replaced by (Canada) Brayden Schnur
- (Spain) Fernando Verdasco → replaced by (Japan) Yūichi Sugita

== Doubles main-draw entrants ==
=== Seeds ===
Country	Player	Country	Player	Rank^{1}	Seed
NED	Jean-Julien Rojer	ROU	Horia Tecău	39	1
CRO	Ivan Dodig	SVK	Filip Polášek	43	2
CRO	Mate Pavić	BRA	Bruno Soares	44	3
NED	Wesley Koolhof	FRA	Fabrice Martin	47	4

- Rankings are as of October 7, 2019

=== Other entrants ===
The following pairs received wildcards into the doubles main draw:

- (Sweden) André Göransson / (United States) Nathaniel Lammons
- (Sweden) Elias Ymer / (Sweden) Mikael Ymer
