= 2017 Stockholm Open – Singles =

Singles
- 2017 Stockholm Open

Final
- Champion: (Argentina) Juan Martín del Potro
- Runner-up: (Bulgaria) Grigor Dimitrov
- Score: 6–4, 6–2

Details
- Draw: 28 (4 Q / 3 WC )
- Seeds: 8

Events
Singles	Doubles
- Stockholm Open

Juan Martín del Potro was the defending champion and successfully retained his title, defeating Grigor Dimitrov in the final, 6–4, 6–2.

== Seeds ==
The top four seeds receive a bye into the second round.

1. (Bulgaria) Grigor Dimitrov (final)
2. (South Africa) Kevin Anderson (quarterfinals)
3. (United States) Jack Sock (quarterfinals)
4. (Argentina) Juan Martín del Potro (champion)
5. (Germany) Mischa Zverev (quarterfinals)
6. (Italy) Fabio Fognini (semifinals)
7. (Japan) Yūichi Sugita (quarterfinals)
8. (Spain) Fernando Verdasco (semifinals)

== Draw ==
Key

- Q = Qualifier
- WC = Wild card
- LL = Lucky loser
- Alt = Alternate
- ITF = ITF entry
- PR = Protected ranking
- SR = Special ranking
- SE = Special exempt
- JE = Junior exempt
- JR = Junior Accelerator Programme entrant
- CO = College Accelerator Programme entrant
- NG = Next Gen Accelerator Program entrant
- w/o = Walkover
- r = Retired
- d = Defaulted

=== Finals ===
Semifinals
1	(Bulgaria) Grigor Dimitrov	6	7^{7}
6	(Italy) Fabio Fognini	3	6^{2}
4	(Argentina) Juan Martín del Potro	6^{4}	6	7^{7}
8	(Spain) Fernando Verdasco	7^{7}	4	6^{1}

Final
1	(Bulgaria) Grigor Dimitrov	4	2
4	(Argentina) Juan Martín del Potro	6	6

=== Top half ===
First round
(France) P-H Herbert	2	6	3
Q	(Poland) J Janowicz	6	3	6
(Serbia) V Troicki	6	6
Q	(Italy) S Bolelli	3	3
WC	(Sweden) M Ymer	6	5	4
5/WC	(Germany) M Zverev	1	7	6
(France) J Chardy	6	7
(Italy) A Giannessi	0	5
(Argentina) L Mayer	4	6	5
WC	(Sweden) E Ymer	6	3	7
(Tunisia) M Jaziri	5	1
6	(Italy) F Fognini	7	6

Second round
1	(Bulgaria) G Dimitrov	7	7^{7}
Q	(Poland) J Janowicz	5	6^{5}
(Serbia) V Troicki	2	3
5/WC	(Germany) M Zverev	6	6
3	(United States) J Sock	6	6
(France) J Chardy	4	4
WC	(Sweden) E Ymer	4	6	6^{7}
6	(Italy) F Fognini	6	3	7^{9}

Quarterfinals
1	(Bulgaria) G Dimitrov	6	6
5/WC	(Germany) M Zverev	3	4
3	(United States) J Sock	7^{7}	6^{2}	5
6	(Italy) F Fognini	6^{3}	7^{7}	7

Semifinals
1	(Bulgaria) G Dimitrov	6	7^{7}
6	(Italy) F Fognini	3	6^{2}

=== Bottom half ===
First round
7	(Japan) Y Sugita	1	6	7^{7}
(Uzbekistan) D Istomin	6	3	6^{4}
(Slovakia) N Gombos	3	4
(Cyprus) M Baghdatis	6	6
(Romania) M Copil	7^{7}	4	6^{12}
(Germany) J-L Struff	6^{2}	6	7^{14}
8	(Spain) F Verdasco	6	6
(Netherlands) R Haase	3	1
Q	(Slovakia) L Lacko	4	7^{7}	2
LL	(Estonia) J Zopp	6	6^{1}	6
Q	(Hungary) M Fucsovics	3	2
(South Korea) H Chung	6	6

Second round
7	(Japan) Y Sugita	6	3	6
(Cyprus) M Baghdatis	3	6	2
(Germany) J-L Struff	2	6^{6}
4	(Argentina) JM del Potro	6	7^{8}
8	(Spain) F Verdasco	6	6
LL	(Estonia) J Zopp	4	2
(South Korea) H Chung	3	2
2	(South Africa) K Anderson	6	6

Quarterfinals
7	(Japan) Y Sugita	2	6^{6}
4	(Argentina) JM del Potro	6	7^{8}
8	(Spain) F Verdasco	7^{7}	7^{7}
2	(South Africa) K Anderson	6^{1}	6^{1}

Semifinals
4	(Argentina) JM del Potro	6^{4}	6	7^{7}
8	(Spain) F Verdasco	7^{7}	4	6^{1}

== Qualifying ==
=== Seeds ===
1. (Hungary) Márton Fucsovics (qualified)
2. (Slovakia) Lukáš Lacko (qualified)
3. (Norway) Casper Ruud (first round)
4. (Poland) Jerzy Janowicz (qualified)
5. (Italy) Stefano Napolitano (first round)
6. (Argentina) Marco Trungelliti (first round)
7. (Estonia) Jürgen Zopp (qualifying competition, lucky loser)
8. (United States) Tim Smyczek (qualifying competition)

=== Qualifiers ===
1. (Hungary) Márton Fucsovics
2. (Slovakia) Lukáš Lacko
3. (Italy) Simone Bolelli
4. (Poland) Jerzy Janowicz

=== Lucky losers ===
1. (Estonia) Jürgen Zopp

=== Qualifying draw ===
==== First qualifier ====
First round
1	(Hungary) Márton Fucsovics	6	6
WC	(Sweden) Karl Friberg	0	3
(France) Stéphane Robert	6^{4}	6	4
8	(United States) Tim Smyczek	7^{7}	1	6

Qualifying competition
1	(Hungary) Márton Fucsovics	6	6
8	(United States) Tim Smyczek	4	0

==== Second qualifier ====
First round
2	(Slovakia) Lukáš Lacko	6	6
(Croatia) Viktor Galović	4	3
(Czech Republic) Zdeněk Kolář	7^{9}	3	6
6	(Argentina) Marco Trungelliti	6^{7}	6	3

Qualifying competition
2	(Slovakia) Lukáš Lacko	6^{5}	7^{7}	6
(Czech Republic) Zdeněk Kolář	7^{7}	6^{3}	3

==== Third qualifier ====
First round
3	(Norway) Casper Ruud	4	4
(Italy) Simone Bolelli	6	6
(Ukraine) Illya Marchenko	6	6
5	(Italy) Stefano Napolitano	1	2

Qualifying competition
(Italy) Simone Bolelli	6	1	7^{7}
(Ukraine) Illya Marchenko	3	6	6^{2}

==== Fourth qualifier ====
First round
4	(Poland) Jerzy Janowicz	6^{1}	7	6
(Italy) Andrea Arnaboldi	7^{7}	5	1
WC	(Sweden) Fred Simonsson	4	2
7	(Estonia) Jürgen Zopp	6	6

Qualifying competition
4	(Poland) Jerzy Janowicz	6	6^{3}	6
7	(Estonia) Jürgen Zopp	1	7^{7}	4
