= 2018 Stockholm Open – Doubles =

Doubles
- 2018 Stockholm Open

Final
- Champions: (United Kingdom) Luke Bambridge (United Kingdom) Jonny O'Mara
- Runners-up: (New Zealand) Marcus Daniell (Netherlands) Wesley Koolhof
- Score: 7–5, 7–6^{(10–8)}

Events
Singles	Doubles
← 2017 ·	Stockholm Open	· 2019 →

Oliver Marach and Mate Pavić were the defending champions, but chose not to defend their title.

Luke Bambridge and Jonny O'Mara won the title, defeating Marcus Daniell and Wesley Koolhof in the final, 7–5, 7–6^{(10–8)}.

== Seeds ==
1. (Spain) Marc López / (Pakistan) Aisam-ul-Haq Qureshi (quarterfinals)
2. (United States) Jack Sock / (United States) Jackson Withrow (quarterfinals)
3. (New Zealand) Marcus Daniell / (Netherlands) Wesley Koolhof (final)
4. (United Kingdom) Ken Skupski / (United Kingdom) Neal Skupski (quarterfinals)

== Draw ==
=== Key ===
- Q = Qualifier
- WC = Wild card
- LL = Lucky loser
- Alt = Alternate
- SE = Special exempt
- PR = Protected ranking
- ITF = ITF entry
- JE = Junior exempt
- w/o = Walkover
- r = Retired
- d = Defaulted
- SR = Special ranking

=== Draw ===
First round
1	(Spain) M López (Pakistan) A-u-H Qureshi	6	6
(Australia) A de Minaur (Australia) J Millman	4	2
(United States) J Cerretani (Greece) S Tsitsipas	6^{4}	6	[9]
(Italy) S Bolelli (Croatia) I Dodig	7^{7}	4	[11]
4	(United Kingdom) K Skupski (United Kingdom) N Skupski	4	7^{7}	[10]
(Denmark) F Nielsen (United Kingdom) J Salisbury	6	6^{2}	[7]
(United Kingdom) L Bambridge (United Kingdom) J O'Mara	6	7^{7}
(Japan) T Daniel (Germany) M Marterer	4	6^{3}
(Australia) M Ebden (Sweden) R Lindstedt	6	6
WC	(Sweden) M Eriksson (Sweden) A Göransson	2	4
WC	(Sweden) E Ymer (Sweden) M Ymer	4	6	[4]
3	(New Zealand) M Daniell (Netherlands) W Koolhof	6	4	[10]
(Uruguay) A Behar (India) J Nedunchezhiyan	0	6	[3]
(France) J Benneteau (France) L Pouille	6	4	[10]
(France) F Martin (Croatia) F Škugor	6^{12}	7^{8}	[8]
2	(United States) J Sock (United States) J Withrow	7^{14}	6^{6}	[10]

Quarterfinals
1	(Spain) M López (Pakistan) A-u-H Qureshi	5	4
(Italy) S Bolelli (Croatia) I Dodig	7	6
4	(United Kingdom) K Skupski (United Kingdom) N Skupski	4	7^{9}	[7]
(United Kingdom) L Bambridge (United Kingdom) J O'Mara	6	6^{7}	[10]
(Australia) M Ebden (Sweden) R Lindstedt	7^{7}	2	[9]
3	(New Zealand) M Daniell (Netherlands) W Koolhof	6^{3}	6	[11]
(France) J Benneteau (France) L Pouille	4	6	[12]
2	(United States) J Sock (United States) J Withrow	6	2	[10]

Semifinals
(Italy) S Bolelli (Croatia) I Dodig	3	4
(United Kingdom) L Bambridge (United Kingdom) J O'Mara	6	6
3	(New Zealand) M Daniell (Netherlands) W Koolhof	7^{7}	7^{9}
(France) J Benneteau (France) L Pouille	6^{5}	6^{7}

Final
(United Kingdom) L Bambridge (United Kingdom) J O'Mara	7	7^{10}
3	(New Zealand) M Daniell (Netherlands) W Koolhof	5	6^{8}
