= 2019 Stockholm Open – Doubles =

Doubles
- 2019 Stockholm Open

Final
- Champions: (Finland) Henri Kontinen (France) Édouard Roger-Vasselin
- Runners-up: (Croatia) Mate Pavić (Brazil) Bruno Soares
- Score: 6–4, 6–2

Events
Singles	Doubles
← 2018 ·	Stockholm Open	· 2020 →

Luke Bambridge and Jonny O'Mara were the defending champions but chose to defend their title with different partners. Bambridge played alongside Ben McLachlan, but lost in the first round to Wesley Koolhof and Fabrice Martin. O'Mara teamed up with Ken Skupski, but lost in the first round to Mate Pavić and Bruno Soares.

Henri Kontinen and Édouard Roger-Vasselin won the title, defeating Pavić and Soares in the final, 6–4, 6–2.

== Seeds ==
1. (Netherlands) Jean-Julien Rojer / (Romania) Horia Tecău (semifinals)
2. (Croatia) Ivan Dodig / (Slovakia) Filip Polášek (quarterfinals)
3. (Croatia) Mate Pavić / (Brazil) Bruno Soares (final)
4. (Netherlands) Wesley Koolhof / (France) Fabrice Martin (semifinals)

== Draw ==
=== Key ===
- Q = Qualifier
- WC = Wild card
- LL = Lucky loser
- Alt = Alternate
- SE = Special exempt
- PR = Protected ranking
- ITF = ITF entry
- JE = Junior exempt
- w/o = Walkover
- r = Retired
- d = Defaulted
- SR = Special ranking

=== Draw ===
First round
1	(Netherlands) J-J Rojer (Romania) H Tecău	7	6
(United States) N Monroe (United States) S Querrey	5	3
WC	(Sweden) A Göransson (United States) N Lammons	6	6
(Spain) P Andújar (Spain) G Granollers	2	3
3	(Croatia) M Pavić (Brazil) B Soares	6	7^{7}
(United Kingdom) J O'Mara (United Kingdom) K Skupski	4	6^{3}
WC	(Sweden) E Ymer (Sweden) M Ymer	6^{6}	1
(Moldova) R Albot (Sweden) R Lindstedt	7^{8}	6
(India) R Bopanna (India) D Sharan	6^{5}	4
(United Kingdom) D Inglot (United States) A Krajicek	7^{7}	6
(United Kingdom) L Bambridge (Japan) B McLachlan	6^{6}	4
4	(Netherlands) W Koolhof (France) F Martin	7^{8}	6
(Finland) H Kontinen (France) É Roger-Vasselin	6	6
(United States) T Fritz (United States) R Opelka	4	4
(Chile) H Podlipnik Castillo (Austria) T-S Weissborn	2	2
2	(Croatia) I Dodig (Slovakia) F Polášek	6	6

Quarterfinals
1	(Netherlands) J-J Rojer (Romania) H Tecău	7^{7}	6
WC	(Sweden) A Göransson (United States) N Lammons	6^{5}	2
3	(Croatia) M Pavić (Brazil) B Soares	6	6
(Moldova) R Albot (Sweden) R Lindstedt	3	3
(United Kingdom) D Inglot (United States) A Krajicek	6^{9}	6^{5}
4	(Netherlands) W Koolhof (France) F Martin	7^{11}	7^{7}
(Finland) H Kontinen (France) É Roger-Vasselin	7^{7}	7
2	(Croatia) I Dodig (Slovakia) F Polášek	6^{2}	5

Semifinals
1	(Netherlands) J-J Rojer (Romania) H Tecău	2	5
3	(Croatia) M Pavić (Brazil) B Soares	6	7
4	(Netherlands) W Koolhof (France) F Martin	3	6	[14]
(Finland) H Kontinen (France) É Roger-Vasselin	6	3	[16]

Final
3	(Croatia) M Pavić (Brazil) B Soares	4	2
(Finland) H Kontinen (France) É Roger-Vasselin	6	6
