= Ernests Gulbis =

Latvian tennis player (born 1988)

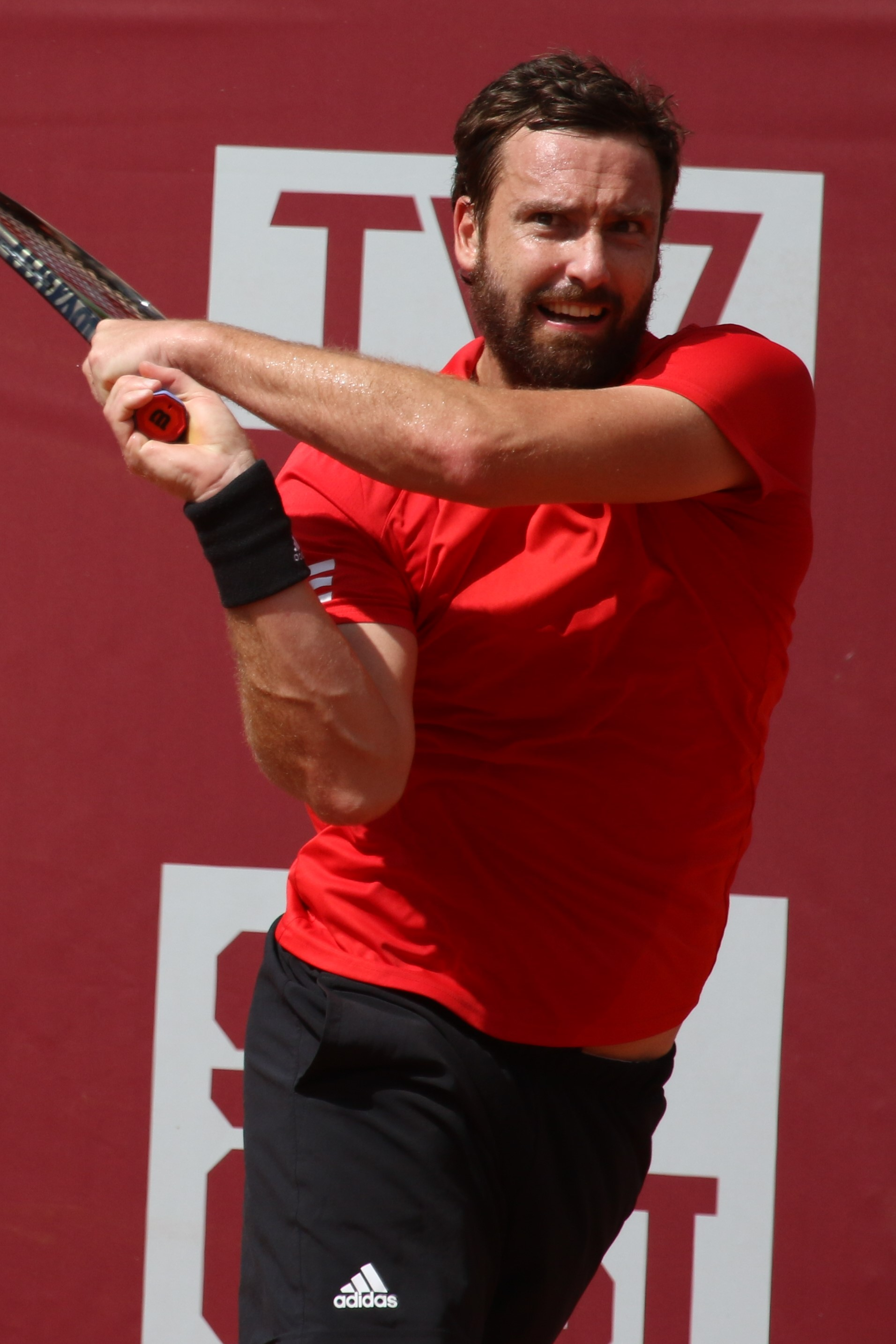
- Gulbis at the 2022 BNP Paribas Primrose Bordeaux
- Country (sports): Latvia
- Residence: Jūrmala, Latvia
- Born: 30 August 1988 (age 38) Riga, Latvian SSR
- Height: 1.91 m (6 ft 3 in)
- Turned pro: 2004
- Retired: 2024
- Plays: Right-handed (two-handed backhand)
- Coach: Kevin D'Arcy (2011–2012); Larry Stefanki (2016–2017); Günter Bresnik (2012–2016, 2018–2021); Pjotrs Ņečajevs (2017–2018, 2021–2023)
- Prize money: US$7,668,948

Singles
- Career record: 248–239 (at ATP Tour level, Grand Slam level, and in Davis Cup)
- Career titles: 6
- Highest ranking: No. 10 (9 June 2014)

Grand Slam singles results
- Australian Open: 3R (2020)
- French Open: SF (2014)
- Wimbledon: 4R (2018)
- US Open: 4R (2007)

Other tournaments
- Olympic Games: 1R (2008)

Doubles
- Career record: 32–34 (at ATP Tour level, Grand Slam level, and in Davis Cup)
- Career titles: 2
- Highest ranking: No. 130 (23 November 2009)

Grand Slam doubles results
- Wimbledon: 1R (2007)
- Last updated on: 15 December 2025.

Ernests Gulbis (Latvian pronunciation: [ˈærnests ˈɡulbis], born 30 August 1988) is a Latvian tennis coach and a former professional player. He was ranked world No. 10 by the ATP in June 2014, making him the only Latvian men's tennis player to be ranked inside the top 10. Gulbis won six ATP Tour singles titles and two in doubles. His best performance at the majors was reaching the semifinals of the 2014 French Open, as well as the quarterfinals of the 2008 French Open.

Gulbis was coached by Karl Heinz Wetter, and subsequently by Nikola Pilić, the former professional Croatian tennis player and Croatian and German Davis Cup captain. Afterwards, he was coached by Hernán Gumy (who before that was Marat Safin's coach), but their partnership ended due to Gumy's schedule; during that time, Darren Cahill served as Gulbis' consultant for several tournaments. He was then coached by Guillermo Cañas, and after Wimbledon 2011, by Günter Bresnik, until his departure before the 2016 French Open. From September 2022 to August 2025, Gulbis was the president of the Latvian Tennis Union, and during that time ended his career as a professional tennis player.

== Personal life ==
Gulbis grew up in an upper-class household. His book-collecting parents named him after Ernest Hemingway. His father Ainārs is an investment businessman, and his mother Milēna Gulbe-Kavace is a theater actress. His maternal grandfather Uldis Pūcītis was a popular actor and film director.

The second of five children, Gulbis has three sisters and one brother. His younger half-sister Laura Gulbe is also a tennis player. Gulbis comes from a sporting family in general, and his paternal grandfather, Alvils Gulbis, was one of the starting five players on ASK Rīga, the Soviet Union basketball team that won the European Championships. He first started playing tennis with his grandmother. Gulbis married Tamara Kopaleyshvili in November 2017, and they are raising a child in Riga, Latvia.

When Gulbis stunned world no. 1 Roger Federer at the 2010 Italian Open after throwing away six match points, he told reporters that "I shit my pants a little bit there...excuse my language" and has bragged about his racquet-throwing "skills" in an on-court interview. On a telecast during the 2010 Western and Southern Financial Group Masters from Cincinnati, broadcasters Brad Gilbert, Patrick McEnroe and Chris Fowler compared Gulbis to former world No. 1 Marat Safin in terms of both playing style and attitude on and off court. Like Safin, Gulbis often comments about his own lack of discipline and/or interest in practising, but is forthcoming about his aspirations for a high ranking.

In 2009, Gulbis was arrested in Sweden for soliciting prostitutes. He called it a "misunderstanding". After paying a fine, he was released in time to play in the Stockholm Open. Speaking about the need for more explosive rivalries in tennis (e. g., Connors-McEnroe), in 2013 he said that Federer, Nadal, Djokovic and Andy Murray were "boring" in interviews. The next year, at the French Open, when Gulbis was asked if he would encourage his sisters to pursue professional tennis, he said he believed that women should "focus on family and kids".

Gulbis speaks Latvian, English, Russian, some French, and German. He is nicknamed "Lord", "The Gull" or "Ernie".

== Tennis career ==
=== Early years ===
Gulbis began playing tennis at the age of 5 with his grandmother. At the age of 12, he attended the Nikola Pilić tennis academy in Munich and trained there until age 18. One of the players he trained with at the Niki Pilić academy was future world No. 1 Novak Djokovic who sometimes practiced with Gulbis when they were at the academy. He refused to play much junior tennis as he only played in three tournaments winning one in May 2004. He mainly played in men's ITF futures events to start his career and officially turned pro in June 2004 at the age of 15.

=== Professional career ===
==== 2004–2006: ITF and challenger success and St. Petersburg semifinal ====
Gulbis' first event at any level was a challenger tournament in Germany in June 2004 after receiving a wildcard into the main draw. He lost in the first round to Teymuraz Gabashvili in straight sets. For most of 2004–2006, he solely played ITF futures events while also occasionally playing in challenger events. At first, he struggled to win matches. But his results started to improve as time went on and he won his first futures title in September 2005. After this win, he made four more futures finals in 2006 winning two.

In July 2006, Gulbis made his first challenger final where he lost to Michal Tabara in straight sets. Two weeks later, he made his second challenger final where he lost to top seed Florian Mayer in three sets.

Gulbis received direct entry into the 2006 US Open Qualifying, his first Grand Slam qualifying draw. There, he upset 5th seed Dick Norman in the first round in straight sets before losing in the second round to Michaël Llodra in straight sets.

Gulbis made his ATP debut at the 2006 St. Petersburg Open after receiving a wildcard into the main draw. There, he reached the semifinals where he lost to 3rd seed and eventual champion Mario Ančić in straight sets. Because of his result, his ranking jumped 48 spots from 204 to 156.

Gulbis ended 2006 with his first challenger title without losing a set defeating Philipp Petzschner in the final. He also won two doubles challenger titles within the year both partnering Mischa Zverev and another doubles final partnering compatriot Deniss Pavlovs. He ended the year with a year-end ranking of 141. A remarkable jump from his ranking of 418 at the beginning of the year. His results during the year earned him the award for Rising Star of the Year at the 2006 Latvian Sports Awards.

==== 2007: Breaking into top 100, Grand Slam debut and US Open fourth round ====
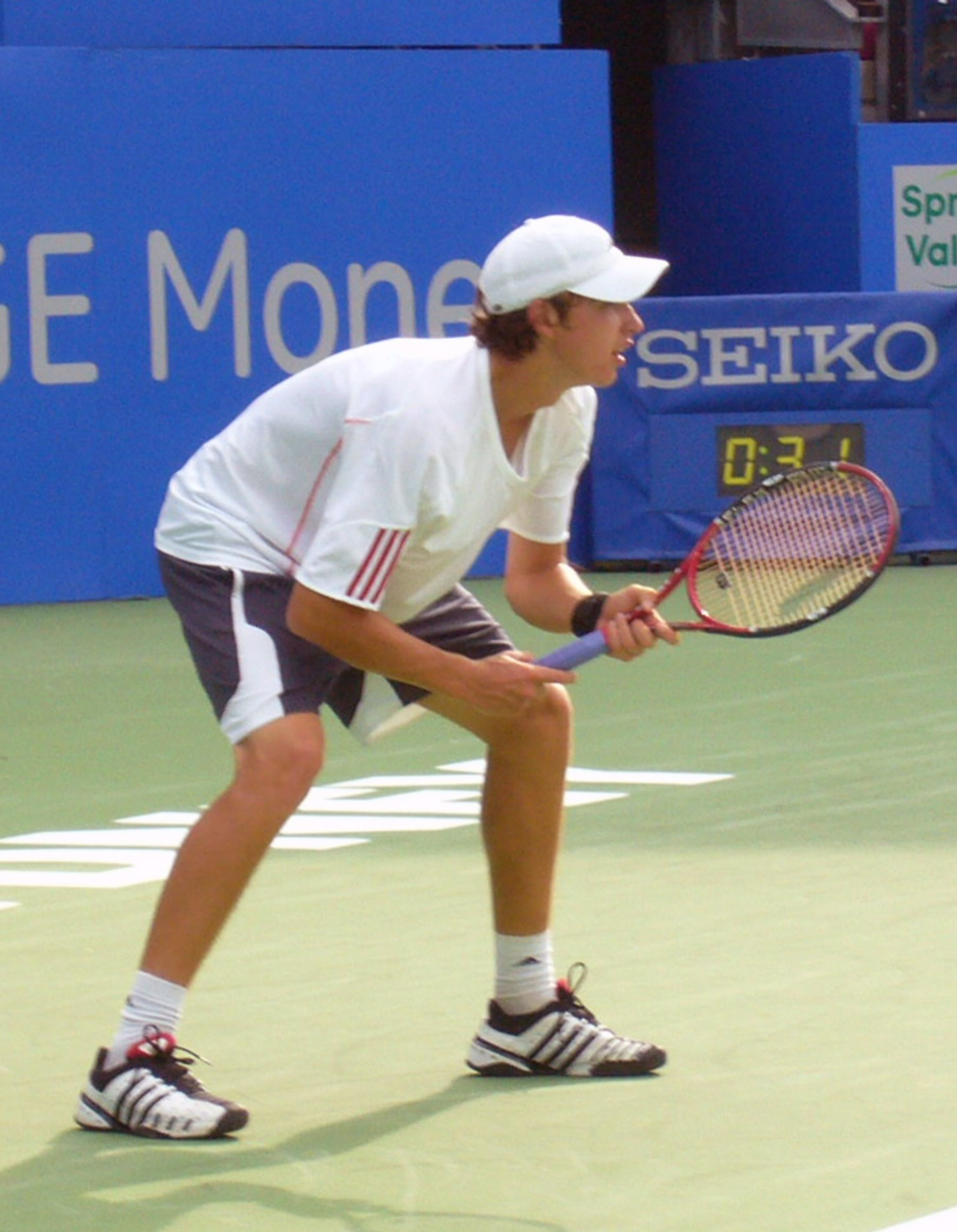
Gulbis in Sydney against Baghdatis

Gulbis started his season as a qualifier in the Sydney Medibank International, losing in the first round to Marcos Baghdatis of Cyprus. He was subsequently defeated in the first qualifying round of the Australian Open.

Gulbis was relatively successful on the Challenger circuit in 2007. He reached the quarterfinals in Bergamo (l. to Fabrice Santoro) and the semifinals in Heilbronn (l. to Michaël Llodra). Gulbis won his second Challenger title by triumphing over the local favorite, Edouard Roger-Vasselin, at the Besançon Challenger in France, enabling him to break into the ATP Top 100 for the first time in his career. In his next tournament, the Sarajevo Challenger, Gulbis emerged victorious in both the singles and doubles events.

In the first week of October, he won the Mons Challenger in Belgium (d. Kristof Vliegen) as the top seed, breaking into the ATP Top 50 for the first time in his career and surpassing Juan Martín del Potro as the highest-ranked player born in 1988. This win also meant a fourth consecutive title.

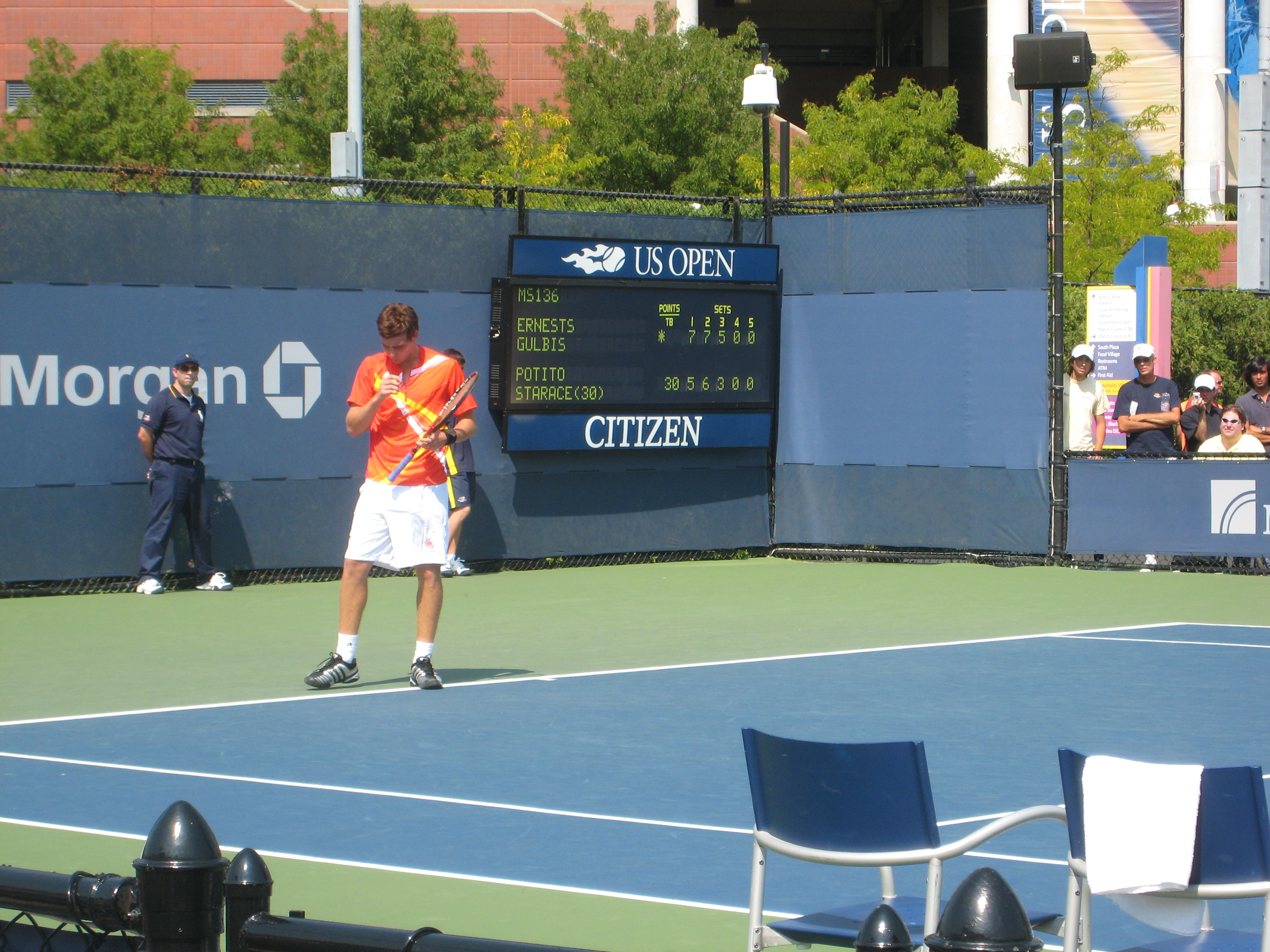
Gulbis during a match with Potito Starace at the 2007 US Open.

Gulbis announced his arrival on the Grand Slam stage in the 2007 French Open by defeating the British veteran, Tim Henman in straight sets to advance to the second round. It was heralded by the British Davis Cup captain, John Lloyd, as "... a brilliant performance from Gulbis, that is just pure and utter talent." Gulbis' run was halted in the second round by Spaniard Álbert Montañés in a four-set, rain-interrupted match.

At Wimbledon, his second Grand Slam participation, Gulbis again was drawn to face Marcos Baghdatis in the first round. He won the first set before succumbing in four sets. Gulbis debuted in Grand Slam doubles by teaming up with Ivan Ljubičić, with whom he had reached the semifinals of the 2007 Ordina Open.

At the 2007 US Open, Gulbis upset 30th seed, Potito Starace, in the first round and eighth seed, Tommy Robredo, in the third round, the latter for the loss of only 6 games. In that match, Gulbis broke Robredo six times and had 39 winners to Robredo's seven. Gulbis' run was finally halted by former World No. 1, Carlos Moyà, to whom he lost in four sets.

==== 2008: French Open quarterfinal ====
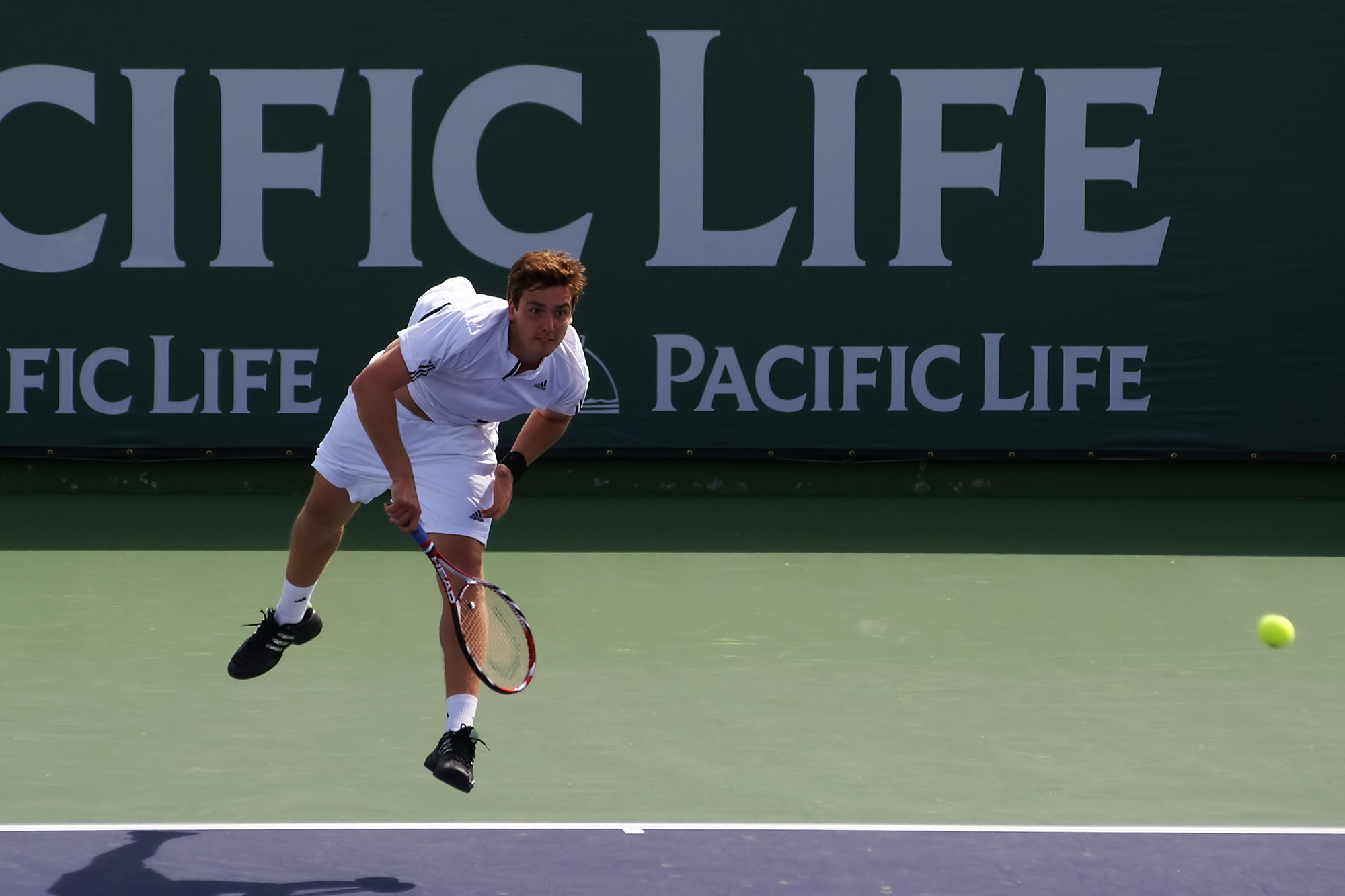
Gulbis serving to David Nalbandian at the 2008 Pacific Life Open.

In the first round of the 2008 Australian Open, Gulbis lost to Marat Safin in straight sets. He reached the second round of the 2008 Pacific Life Open, where he lost a tight match to former Grand Slam finalist David Nalbandian in a final set tiebreak. In the first round of the 2008 Miami Masters, he defeated Dominik Hrbatý, but in the second round met eventual champion Nikolay Davydenko. After winning the first set 6–3, he lost the following two sets in tiebreaks.

His biggest result up to that point occurred when he reached the quarterfinals of the 2008 French Open. Throughout the tournament he beat Simon Greul, seventh seed James Blake, Nicolás Lapentti, and home-favourite Michaël Llodra. In the quarterfinals, he lost to third seed Novak Djokovic in three tight sets.

In his next tournament, he reached the third round of the 2008 Queen's Club Championships, beating Kristof Vliegen and 12th seed Andreas Seppi. He lost to sixth seed Andy Murray, after winning the first set 7–5.

In the first round at Wimbledon, Gulbis defeated fellow rising star John Isner, but lost in the second round to second seed and eventual champion Rafael Nadal in a four set, rain-interrupted match. Other than Roger Federer, he was the only player to take a set off the eventual champion.

At the 2008 Cincinnati Masters, Gulbis defeated Jarkko Nieminen, Arnaud Clément, and James Blake, but succumbed in the quarterfinals to third seed Novak Djokovic.

The young Latvian then traveled to Beijing to take part in the 2008 Summer Olympics, where he lost his first-round match to Nikolay Davydenko.

At the US Open, Gulbis defeated Thomas Johansson in the first round, before losing to Andy Roddick in the second, again after winning the first set. Coincidentally, it was both his and Andy's birthday on the day they played.

==== 2009: Decline in form and rankings ====
Gulbis began the year strongly by defeating world No. 3 Novak Djokovic in straight sets in the first round of the Brisbane International before falling in the second round to Paul-Henri Mathieu. It would also be Gulbis' only victory against Djokovic to date.

He lost in the second round of the 2009 Australian Open to Igor Andreev in five sets, after beating Albert Montañés in the first round in straight sets.

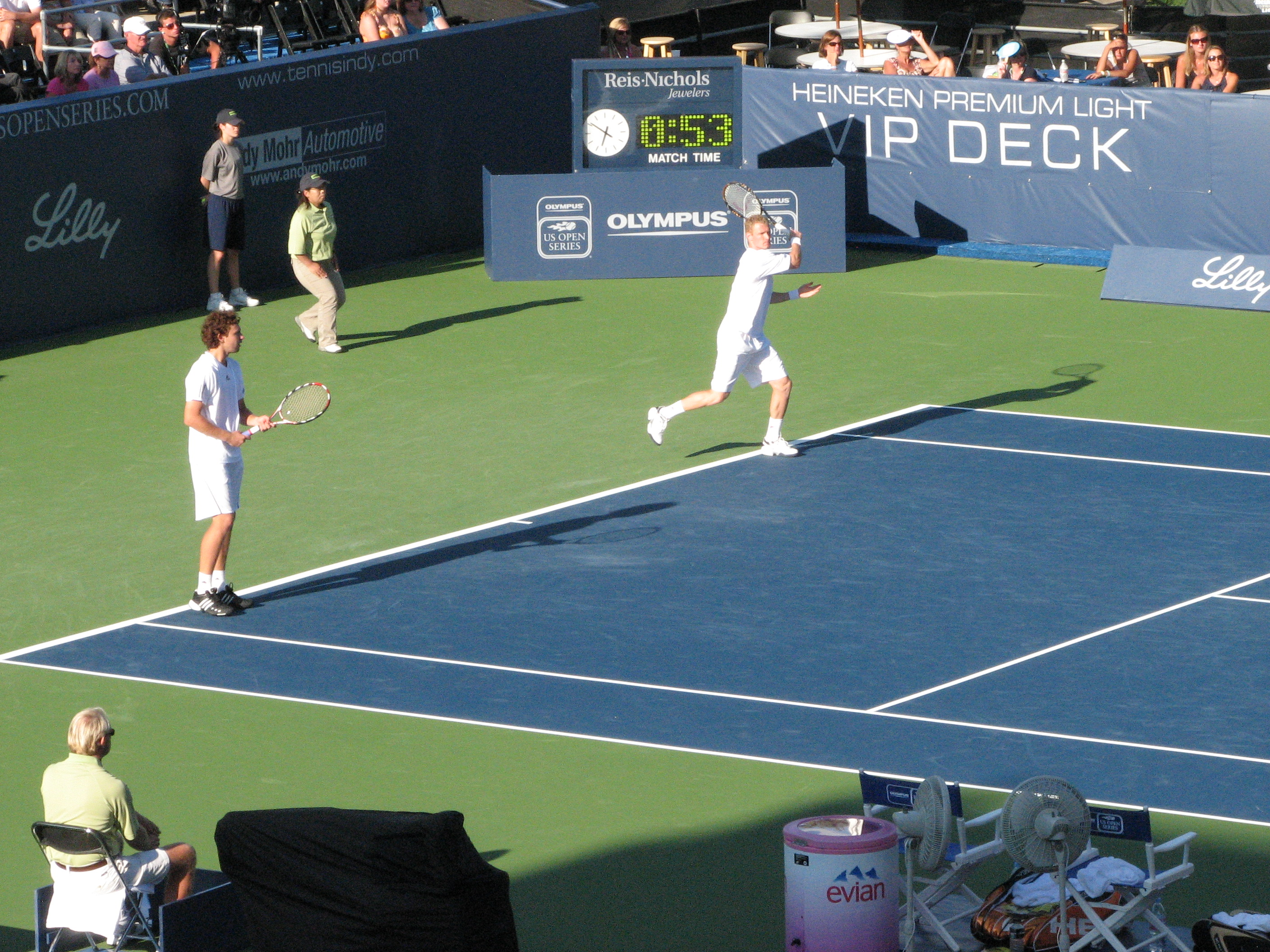
Gulbis won the doubles title with Dmitry Tursunov at the 2009 Indianapolis Tennis Championships.

Gulbis was seeded third heading into the 2009 Delray Beach International Tennis Championships, but was defeated in the first round by former World No. 8 Marcos Baghdatis. It was the fourth time he was drawn to face Baghdatis in the first round of a tournament.

Gulbis had a poor clay-court season compared to 2008, failing to go deep in any of the tournaments preceding the French Open. Gulbis also failed to defend his quarterfinal appearance at the French Open, causing his ranking to drop to World No. 67, the lowest it had been since the summer of 2007.

At the 2009 Wimbledon Championships, Gulbis, unseeded, defeated Italian Riccardo Ghedin in the first round, before falling to third seeded Andy Murray.

Gulbis played in the Indianapolis Tennis Championships in singles and doubles. He lost to Marc Gicquel of France in the first round. However, he entered the doubles draw with Russian Dmitry Tursunov and won the championship, defeating top seeds Ashley Fisher and Jordan Kerr of Australia in the final.

At the US Open, Gulbis was again drawn to play Andy Murray early in a Grand Slam, losing to the No. 2 seed in the first round.

At the 2009 Rakuten Japan Open Tennis Championships, Gulbis advanced to the quarterfinals, upsetting sixth seed Radek Štěpánek in the first round as a qualifier, then defeating top-20 player Juan Mónaco in the second in straight sets. He lost to eventual champion and second seed Jo-Wilfried Tsonga after taking the first set.

The year saw a general decline in his ranking, with Gulbis failing to go deep in any of the Grand Slams. He momentarily dropped out of the top 100 in August and finished the year ranked 90 and with a win–loss record of 20–26.

==== 2010: First ATP title ====
To begin the year, Gulbis claimed wins in the first two rounds of the Australian Open precursor tournament, the Qatar ExxonMobil Open, defeating sixth-seeded Spaniard Albert Montañés and Italian Andreas Seppi. Gulbis progressed to the third round, where he was defeated in a tight three set match against World No. 1 Roger Federer. At the 2010 Australian Open itself, Gulbis was ousted in the first round by 30th seed Argentine Juan Mónaco in straight sets.

In February, Gulbis reached his second career semifinal at an ATP 500 event, the Regions Morgan Keegan Championships in Memphis, Tennessee. In the second round, he defeated third seed Radek Štěpánek, facing two consecutive Czech players as he ousted fifth seed Tomáš Berdych in the third round in a tight, three set match. He lost in the semifinals to eventual champion Sam Querrey.

At the end of February, he then competed in the Delray Beach International Tennis Championships, an outdoor hard-court tournament, where he won his maiden ATP tour title. In the final, he faced 6' 11" Croatian and second seed Ivo Karlović, winning convincingly. With this victory, his ranking rose back into the top 50.

Gulbis' next tournament was the 2010 BNP Paribas Open, an ATP 1000 Tier tournament. Gulbis defeated Swiss player Marco Chiudinelli in the first round, but succumbed to fifth seed Nikolay Davydenko in the second round. Davydenko later withdrew from the tournament due to a wrist injury exacerbated during the match. Gulbis did not compete in the Sony Ericsson Open, instead returning to Europe to train for the clay season.

At his first clay-court tournament of the season, the ATP 1000 Monte-Carlo Rolex Masters, Gulbis again defeated Swiss Marco Chiudinelli in the first round, this time in straight sets, but lost to 13th seed Stan Wawrinka in the second round, also in straight sets. At his next tournament, the ATP 500 Barcelona Open Banco Sabadell, Gulbis reached the quarterfinals, defeating Peter Luczak, Jérémy Chardy, and Albert Ramos-Viñolas, all in straight sets. He lost to in-form, eventual champion Fernando Verdasco in the quarterfinals. With this result, Gulbis' ranking rose back into the top 40 and also pushed his career win–loss record past 50% for the first time in his career, his year-to-date win–loss record at 15–7.

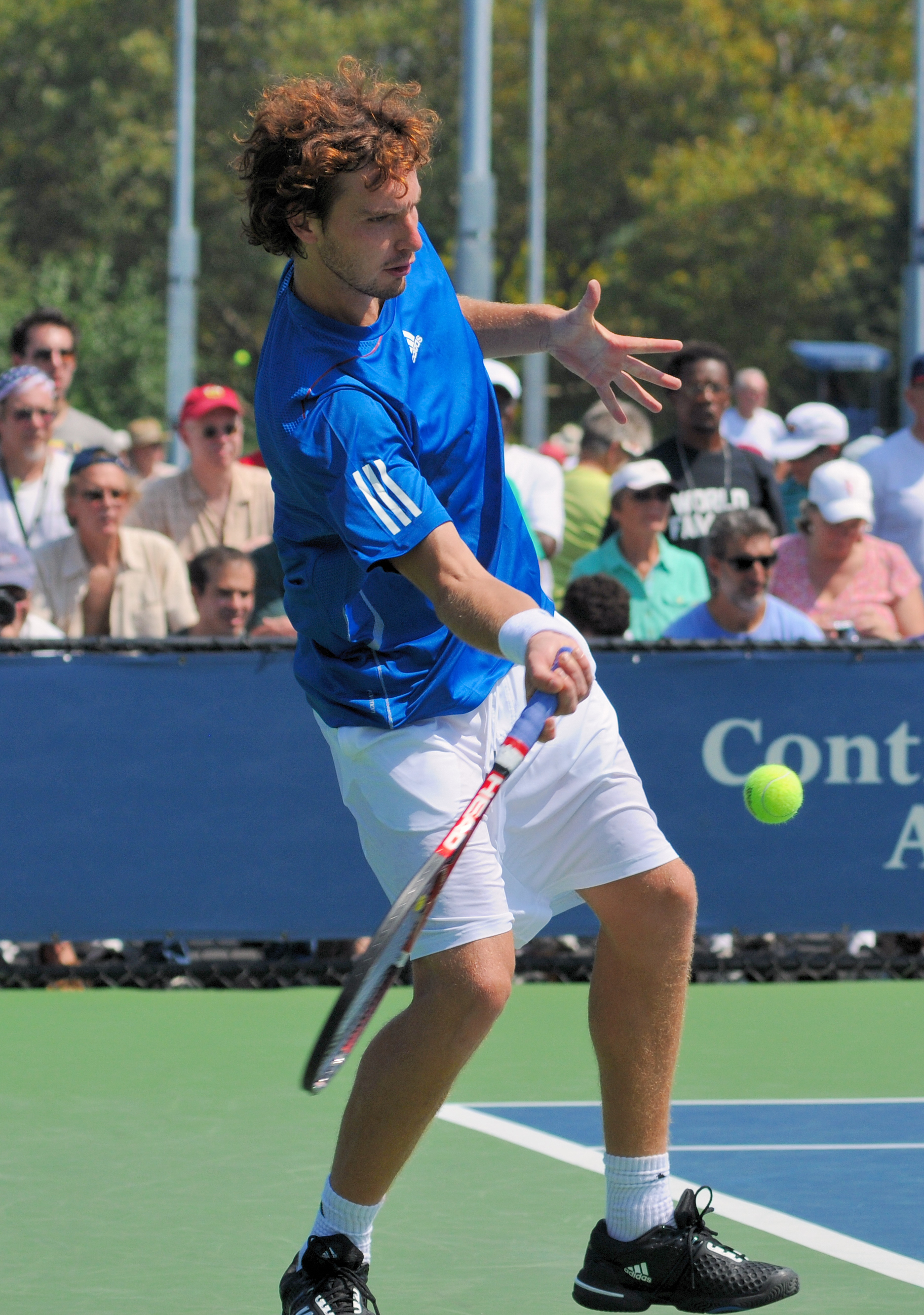
Gulbis at the US Open.

At his next tournament, the 2010 Internazionali BNL d'Italia in Rome, Gulbis was drawn to face Marcos Baghdatis in the first round of a tournament for the fifth time in his career, although for the first time on clay. He defeated Baghdatis for the loss of only four games, which set up a match with top seed and World No. 1 Roger Federer. After losing the first set, Gulbis rallied to win the match 7–5 in the third, converting his seventh match point for his biggest career win to date. In the third round, he backed up his win over Federer, with a battling final set tiebreak victory over Italian qualifier Filippo Volandri. In the next round, Gulbis defeated Feliciano López to reach his first semifinal at an ATP Masters 1000 tournament, where he lost to Rafael Nadal in a tight, three-set match, hitting 50 winners and 59 errors throughout. This made Gulbis the first player to take a set off Nadal on clay in 2010. With his semifinal appearance, he assured himself a seeded position at the 2010 French Open.

At the 2010 Mutua Madrileña Madrid Open, Gulbis got off to a winning start in the first round against 2010 Estoril Open champion Albert Montañés. He carried on his good vein of form, defeating 10th seed Mikhail Youzhny and Feliciano López. In the quarterfinals he again faced World No. 1 Roger Federer, which ended in the opposite result: Gulbis losing after taking the first set.

Expectations were high for Gulbis as the former quarterfinalist came into the 2010 French Open seeded 23rd (ranked World No. 27), after having an incredible clay-court season. However, Gulbis retired during the first round citing a hamstring injury against the veteran Frenchman and World No. 38, Julien Benneteau.

Due to his injury sustained during the clay-court season, Gulbis withdrew from Wimbledon and its precursor tournaments, effectively missing the entire grass season.

Gulbis returned to the ATP in July, first competing in the Farmers Classic in Los Angeles, California. He defeated Lukáš Lacko in the first round in straight sets, but lost to the in-form Alejandro Falla in the round of 16 in three sets. He next played in the Legg Mason Tennis Classic, where he received a first-round bye, but quickly retired in the second round to Ukrainian Illya Marchenko, citing fatigue.

His next tournament was the ATP World Tour Masters 1000 Rogers Cup. He defeated World No. 26 Thomaz Bellucci in the first round easily, but fell to World No. 5 Robin Söderling in the second round in a tight match. He then played the ATP World Tour Masters 1000 Western & Southern Open, defeating Donald Young in the first round and 13th seed Jürgen Melzer in the second, both in close matches. However, he fell in the third round to World No. 4 Andy Murray in another tight encounter, decided by a final set tiebreak.

Gulbis who was the 24th seed, lost in the first round of the US Open to Jérémy Chardy of France in three sets, marking the fourth consecutive first-round lost at a Grand Slam tournament. Gulbis then took three weeks off to play for the Latvian Davis Cup team against Poland, winning both of his singles rubbers against Jerzy Janowicz and Michał Przysiężny. His next tournament was the PTT Thailand Open. He received a bye through the first round, and defeated Rainer Schüttler in three sets, advancing to the quarterfinals, where he fell to Guillermo García-López, also in three sets. He then played the Japan Open Tennis Championships, but suffered an upset defeat at the hands of World No. 432 Dmitry Tursunov.

Gulbis suffered two more consecutive first-round losses at the hands of Richard Gasquet, at the Shanghai Rolex Masters, and Novak Djokovic, at the Swiss Indoors. However, in his final tournament of the season, he bounced back at the ATP World Tour Masters 1000 even in Paris, where he dispatched World No. 40 Juan Ignacio Chela and World No. 10 Mikhail Youzhny, both in straight sets. He then fell to Andy Roddick, also in straight sets.

Gulbis ended the year at a then-career-high of World No. 24.

==== 2011: Second ATP title ====
To begin the year, Gulbis claimed wins in the first two rounds of the Australian Open precursor tournament, the Qatar ExxonMobil Open, defeating Victor Hănescu and Antonio Veić, both in straight sets. Gulbis progressed to the quarterfinals, equaling his 2010 run, where he was defeated in a tight match against World No. 1 Rafael Nadal. Gulbis next played in the 2011 Medibank International Sydney. He received a bye through the first round due to being seeded third for the tournament and defeated Russian Igor Andreev in the second round in three sets. He then defeated Sergiy Stakhovsky in the quarterfinals, before losing to eventual champion Gilles Simon of France in the semifinals, citing fatigue as a cause for his low intensity.

His next tournament was the 2011 Australian Open, where he lost in the first round to unseeded German Benjamin Becker in straight sets, again citing fatigue and illness for his poor showing. It marked his fifth consecutive loss at a Grand Slam event. Gulbis then withdrew from his next three tournaments, his ranking momentarily rising to his personal best of World No. 21 due to Marin Čilić failing to defend his points from the 2010 Australian Open.

Gulbis returned to the tour in late February. His next tournament was the Dubai Tennis Championships, an outdoor hard-court tournament, which was held simultaneously with the Delray Beach International Tennis Championships, the tournament at which Gulbis attained his first ATP title. In the first round, seeded 8th, Gulbis won against wild card entrant and former doubles partner Michael Berrer, despite having trouble with his first serve, giving away seven double faults throughout the match. Gulbis fell to Sergiy Stakhovsky of Ukraine in the second round in three sets.

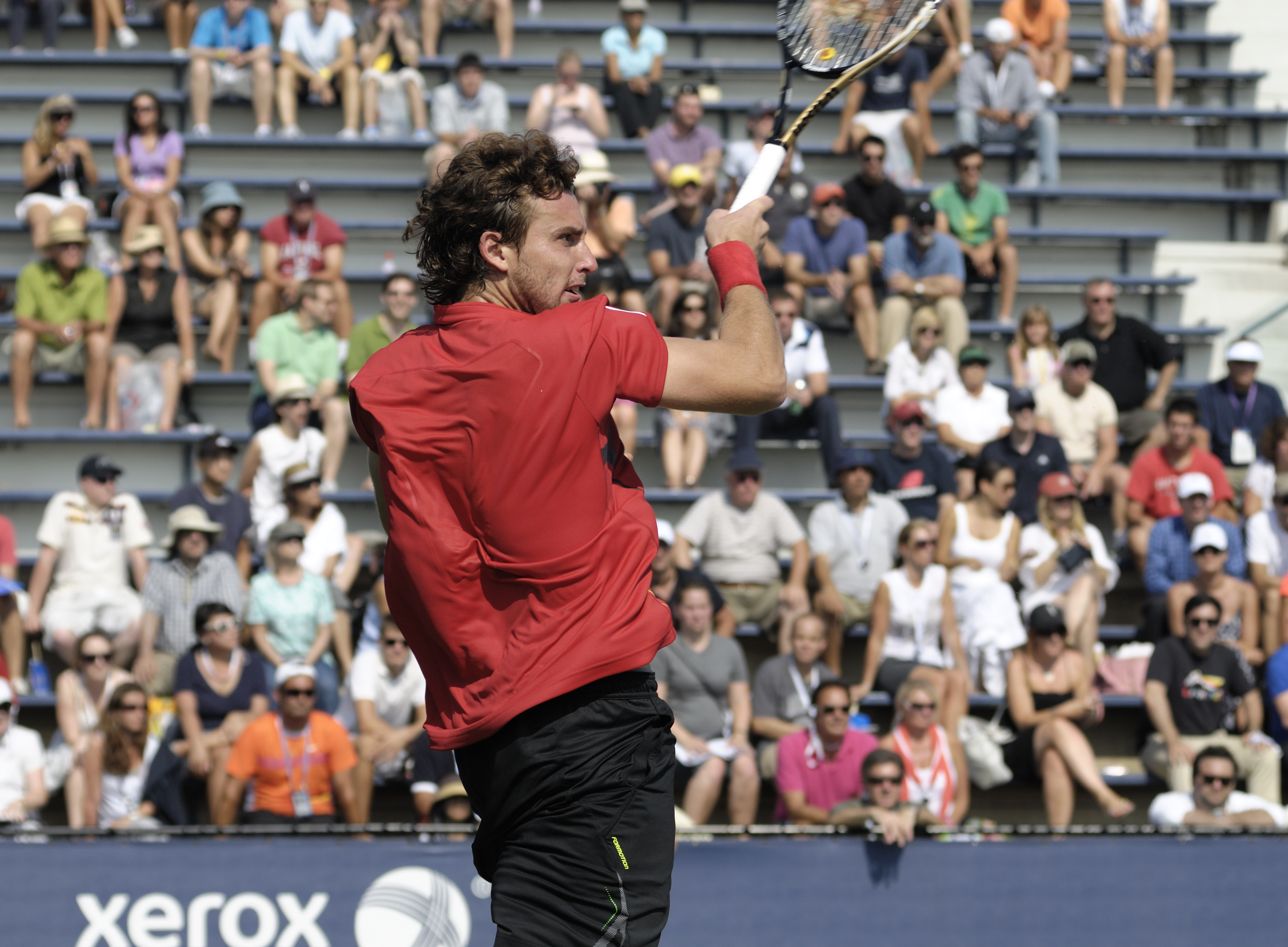
Ernests Gulbis at the 2011 US Open

Gulbis' season did little to improve as he next played in the 2011 BNP Paribas Open, receiving a bye through the first round, before struggling with Lu Yen-Hsun, but ultimately prevailing, with the first two sets going to tiebreaks. In the third round, he was swiftly defeated by eventual winner Novak Djokovic, winning one game. He then proceeded to play the 2011 Sony Ericsson Open, receiving a bye through the first round, but losing in the second round to World No. 72 Carlos Berlocq. Ranked World No. 30 going into the Monte-Carlo Masters, he defeated the Ukrainian World No. 21 Alexandr Dolgopolov in his first round in straight sets, before losing to Milos Raonic in the second round, also in straight sets. Gulbis proceeded to lose in the first round of the 2011 Serbia Open to Ukrainian Illya Marchenko, in straight sets.

From late April to mid-May, Gulbis took three weeks off due to fatigue before competing in the 2011 Open de Nice Côte d'Azur. In his first two rounds, he defeated Fabio Fognini and Denis Istomin, both in three sets, before falling to World No. 6 Tomáš Berdych in the quarterfinals. From there, Gulbis' playing deteriorated further as his ranking dropped from No. 30 to No. 85 during the clay-court season, failing to defend his deep runs in 2010. He proceeded to lose his next four matches in a row: against Blaž Kavčič at the French Open, against Adrian Mannarino at the Queen's Club Championships, against Dmitri Tursunov at Wimbledon (which marked his seventh, consecutive first-round exit at a Grand Slam, and after which he took nearly a month off from tennis to train with his new coach), and against former World No. 4 James Blake at the Atlanta Tennis Championships.

However, Gulbis won his second ATP title at the Farmers Classic in Los Angeles, where he snapped his five-match losing streak by defeating fifth seed Belgian Xavier Malisse in a final set tiebreak in the first-round. He then defeated American qualifier Daniel Kosakowski in straight sets. In the quarterfinals, he defeated Juan Martín del Potro with relative ease, before defeating Russian Alex Bogomolov Jr. in the semifinals. He faced top seed and World No. 9 Mardy Fish in the finals; after double-faulting to hand Fish the first set, he rallied to win the championship match in a close three setter.

Gulbis received a wildcard entry into the 2011 Rogers Cup. He defeated former World No. 1 Juan Carlos Ferrero in three sets in the first round, and proceeded to defeat Michaël Llodra in the second round after Llodra retired, trailing in the second set. In the third round, he fell to eventual finalist Mardy Fish, whom he had recently defeated, in another tight three-setter. He then qualified for the 2011 Cincinnati Masters, where he lost to Croatian Ivan Dodig in two sets. Gulbis reached the second round of the US Open, but lost to Gilles Müller in the third round. He was later fined for improper coaching by the USTA. Gulbis played five more tournaments that year – all hard court – but had four first-round exits and one second-round exit.

==== 2012: Lack of consistency and form ====
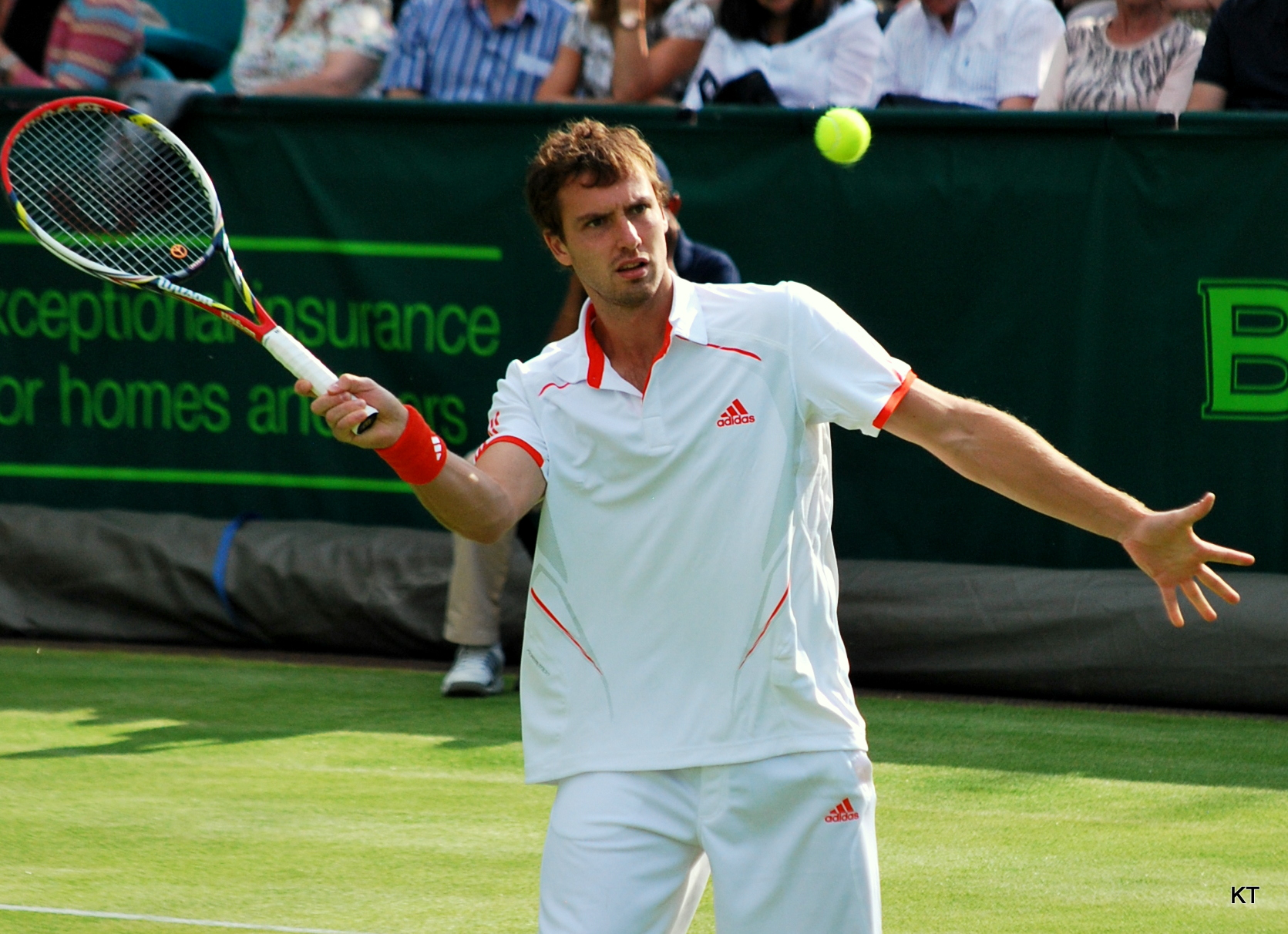
Gulbis defeated World No. 7 Tomáš Berdych at Wimbledon in the first round.

Gulbis began the year with three first-round losses at Doha, Melbourne and Memphis, but in between won two singles rubbers for the Latvian Davis Cup match against Egypt. He also represented Latvia against Hungary, winning one of his two singles rubbers. Prior to that, Gulbis reached the quarterfinals at Delray Beach, defeating Alejandro Falla and Steve Darcis before going down to Marinko Matosevic. Gulbis' only wins during the clay court season were first round wins at Munich and a challenger event, losing in five sets to Mikhail Kukushkin at the French Open. During this time, Gulbis was transitioning to a new coach, Gunter Bresnik, the former Austrian Davis Cup Captain who had previously worked with Becker and Leconte.

Guilbis reached the second round at Wimbledon by dispatching World No. 7 and sixth seed Tomáš Berdych in three tiebreak sets. He lost in the second round in 5 sets to rising star Jerzy Janowicz.

Gulbis lost to Fernando Verdasco in a topsy-turvy match in the second round of the Croatia Open. Gulbis then reached the quarterfinals in Gstaad, losing to Paul-Henri Mathieu. He qualified for Winston-Salem, reaching the third round, before falling to Marcel Granollers.

Gulbis won the first round of the US Open over Tommy Haas, but crashed out in next round against the American Qualifier Steve Johnson.

He finished the year by playing some Challenger tournaments. He took a break due to a leg injury. He came back for the Vienna indoor tournament, where he fell in the second round to Janko Tipsarević. Gulbis didn't manage to qualify for Basel, but reached the final of the Challenger in Eckental, where he lost to Daniel Brands. Later on he had to skip the last two Challengers of the year due illness. He decided to take a longer off-season in order to prepare best for next season.

==== 2013: Third and Fourth ATP titles ====
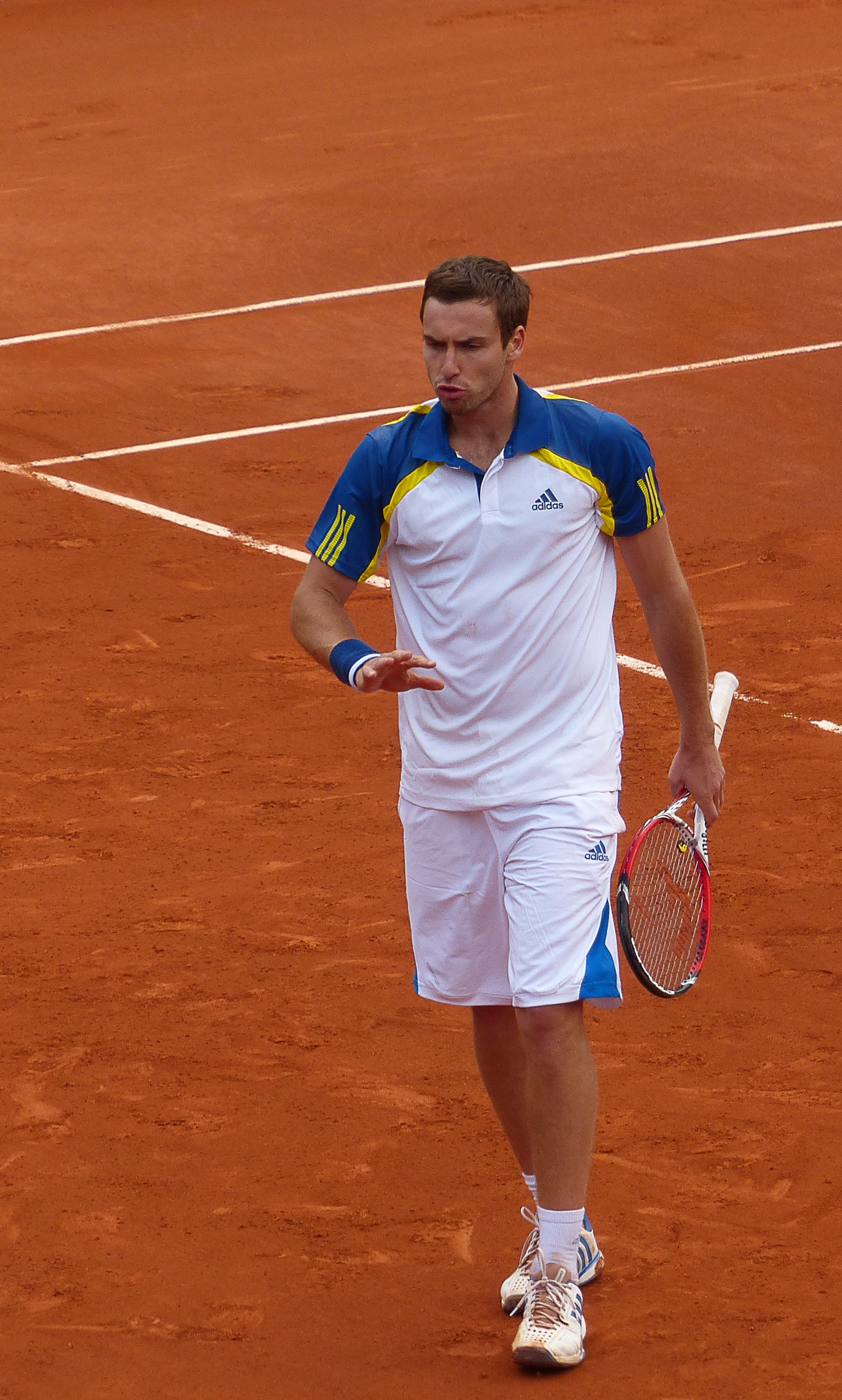
At the French Open Gulbis lost in the second round to Gaël Monfils despite taking the first set.

Gulbis skipped the Australian Open to have a longer off-season and played two Challenger tournaments, where he went out in the second and first rounds. In Rotterdam, he qualified for the maindraw. It was his first ATP tournament of the year, he defeated Robin Haase in the first round, but lost to Juan Martín del Potro in the second, after a first-set tiebreak. For the ATP tournament Marseille, he received a wildcard. After a win against Nieminen, he lost a tight match against Tomáš Berdych.

He went to Florida to qualify for the Delray Beach ATP tournament. After winning seven matches to reach the final, including wins against Sam Querrey and Tommy Haas, Gulbis won his third career ATP title by defeating Édouard Roger-Vasselin in straight sets to claim his first title since 2011.

Gulbis continued his excellent start to 2013 with a great run at the BNP Paribas Open in Indian Wells. After winning his two qualifying rounds, he beat Spaniard Feliciano López in straight sets, crushed ninth seed Janko Tipsarević for the loss of only two games, and then defeated 20th seed Andreas Seppi from a set down to set up a fourth round meeting with the returning Rafael Nadal. Gulbis lost in a tight three setter after taking the first set 6–4, ending his win streak at 13 matches. At the French Open Gulbis lost in the second round to Gaël Monfils despite taking the first set.

At Wimbledon, he defeated Édouard Roger-Vasselin and Jo-Wilfried Tsonga, but was beaten by Fernando Verdasco in the third round.

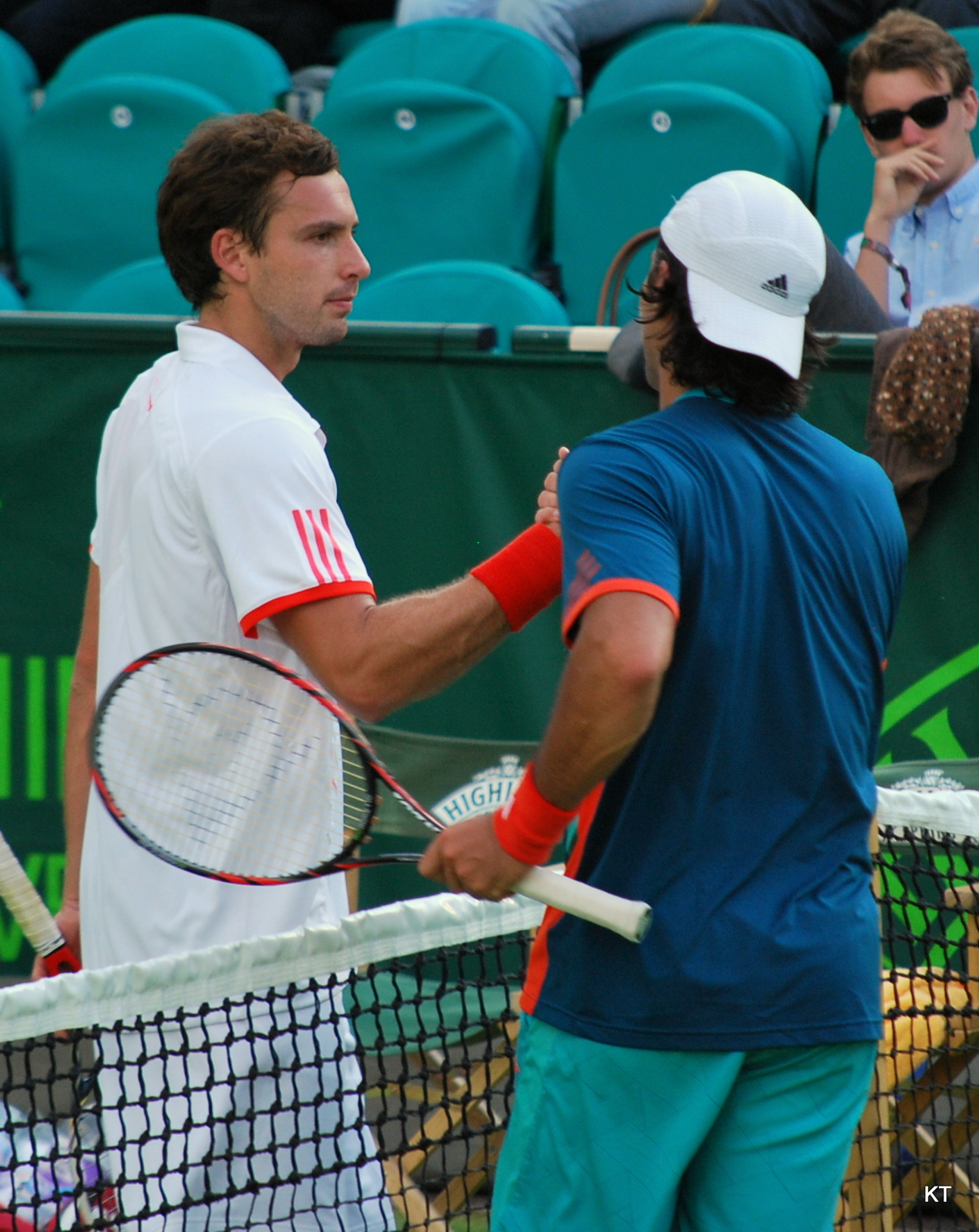
Ernests Gulbis reached the third round at Wimbledon losing out to Fernando Verdasco.

Gulbis defeated Feliciano López, Fabio Fognini, and Andy Murray to make the quarterfinals of the Rogers Cup, losing to finalist Milos Raonic in three sets. He lost in the first round in Cincinnati and at the US Open to Mikhail Youzhny and Andreas Haider-Maurer, respectively.

Gulbis won his fourth career ATP tournament in the St. Petersburg Open, defeating Guillermo García-López in the final. He came back from being down a set and 1–4 to reel off 11 straight games to take the match. It was the first time Gulbis had won more than one ATP title in a single season. As a result, Gulbis rose to No. 27 in the ATP World Tour rankings, improving this season's positive overall match record to 34–15.

Gulbis was absent from the 2013 China Open and the 2013 Shanghai Rolex Masters due to illness. He made his next appearance at the 2013 If Stockholm Open where Gulbis made it to the semi-final stage, losing to David Ferrer in three sets. During the tournament, Gulbis defeated Jérémy Chardy, Igor Sijsling and Jerzy Janowicz.

Gulbis finished his season with two first round defeats by John Isner and Fernando Verdasco at the 2013 Valencia Open 500 and the 2013 BNP Paribas Masters respectively.

==== 2014 Best season: Fifth and Sixth ATP titles, top-10 ranking and first Grand Slam semifinal ====
Gulbis started the new season in Doha, where he reached the quarterfinals, losing to eventual champion Rafael Nadal for the seventh time in his career, in straight sets.

Gulbis was seeded at the 2014 Australian Open, and defeated Juan Mónaco in the first round in four sets by coming back from losing the first set. Gulbis ended the tournament in the second round by losing to Sam Querrey in straight sets.

Gulbis reached the semi-finals of the Rotterdam Open, defeating Grigor Dimitrov and Juan Martín del Potro along the way. He lost the semi-final to the eventual champion Tomáš Berdych.

Gulbis won his fifth ATP title at the Open 13 in Marseille, beating three Frenchmen in succession without losing a set – Nicolas Mahut, then world No.9 Richard Gasquet in the semi-final, then No.10 Jo-Wilfried Tsonga in the final. With this victory, he entered the ATP Top 20 for the first time in his career, at No.18.

Gulbis then played in Acapulco where he was seeded seventh, beating Yen-hsun Lu and David Goffin, then losing two sets to one to eventual champion Grigor Dimitrov in the quarterfinals.

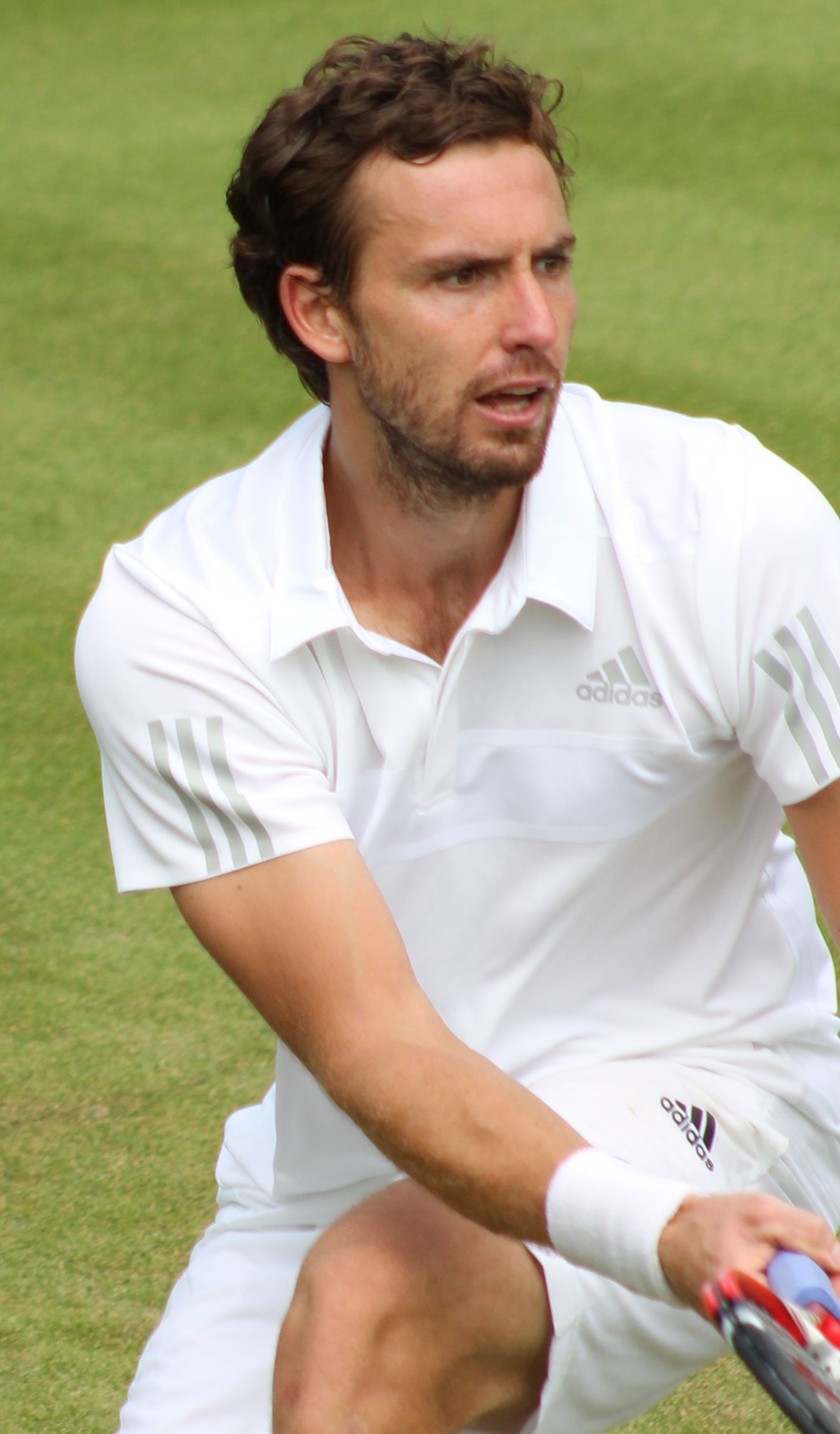
Gulbis entered Wimbledon as the 12th seed, his highest at a Grand Slam.

Next, in March, he played at Indian Wells. He beat João Sousa, Grigor Dimitrov and Roberto Bautista-Agut, but then lost in two tie-break sets to John Isner in the 1/4-finals. At Indian Wells, he also played in the doubles with partner Milos Raonic. They beat Serbia's wildcards Novak Djokovic and Krajinović in round 1, but then lost to Swiss duo Federer and Wawrinka in the second round in two tie-break sets.

Gulbis then played in Miami, where he was seeded 21st and had a bye into the second round. In an almost two and a half hour match, Gulbis lost in three tight sets to veteran Julien Benneteau, having conceded a match point during the match.

Gulbis started his clay-court season in Monte-Carlo but was defeated in the first round by Alexandr Dolgopolov in straight sets. Gulbis also played in the doubles tournament with Milos Raonic, but lost in the first round to Juan Sebastián Cabal and Robert Farah.

His next tournament was the Barcelona Open. Along the way to the semifinals, Gulbis defeated Daniel Gimeno-Traver, Albert Montañés, and Teymuraz Gabashvili. Gulbis was eventually defeated by Kei Nishikori.

Gulbis performed well in the Madrid Masters 1000. In the first round, Gulbis defeated Jerzy Janowicz in three sets. Then, in the second round, Gulbis outmatched Alexandr Dolgopolov in two sets followed by a round of 16 win against Marin Čilić in straight sets. All these tennis players were ranked among the top 30 in the ATP rankings at that time. In the quarter-finals, Gulbis lost in straight sets to David Ferrer. Following the tournament, Gulbis reached a new career-high ranking of No. 17.

Gulbis reached the quarterfinal stage also in the Rome Masters 1000, defeating Alejandro Falla and Stéphane Robert in the process. However, Gulbis then lost to David Ferrer again in straight sets.

In May, Gulbis won his sixth ATP title, beating Federico Delbonis in the final of the ATP Nice Open. It was Gulbis' first ATP singles title on clay.

At the French Open, Gulbis reached the quarterfinals for the second time courtesy of a five-set victory over world No. 4 and 2009 champion Roger Federer. He followed this up with a straight-set win over Tomáš Berdych to reach his first Grand Slam semifinal, where he lost to Novak Djokovic. As a result of this run, Gulbis entered the ATP's top 10 for the first time in his career.

Gulbis' form dropped in the second part of the season, evidenced by his 9–10 win–loss record, following Roland Garros. Gulbis lost to Sergiy Stakhovsky in the round of 64 at Wimbledon and to Julien Benneteau and Steve Johnson in the round of 32 at the Rogers Cup and Cincinnati Masters respectively.

Gulbis also struggled with a shoulder injury in the later part of the season. At the US Open, Gulbis crucially lost to Dominic Thiem in five sets, losing the final three, what seemed to have a negative impact on his confidence and physical condition for the rest of the season. Despite reaching the semifinals of the Malaysian Open, Gulbis retired in the round of 16 of the China Open, lost in the round of 64 of the Shanghai Masters, and was defeated in the round of 32 by Borna Ćorić at the Swiss Indoors in Basel. Gulbis finished the season early due to concerns over his shoulder and illness.

Nevertheless, Gulbis finished his best career season as No. 13, which became his highest year-end ATP ranking.

==== 2015: Struggle with form and fall in rankings ====
Gulbis started his season in Auckland as second seed. He lost his first match of the year to the Czech qualifier Jiří Veselý 2–6, 6–3, 1–6.

At the Australian Open, Gulbis was seeded eleventh, but was defeated by the Australian wildcard Thanasi Kokkinakis in the first round.

At the Open 13 in Marseille, Gulbis failed to defend his title from 2014, falling to Jérémy Chardy in two sets in the round of 16.

Gulbis took his first win of the season against Daniel Gimeno-Traver at the BNP Paribas Open in Indiana Wells. It was the latest first win of the season in ATP level tournaments for Gulbis since 2007. Afterwards, he fell to Adrian Mannarino in two sets in the round of 32.

Gulbis also failed to defend his title from 2014 at the ATP Nice Open, losing to Dominic Thiem in two sets in the quarter-finals.

At the French Open, Gulbis lost in the second round to Nicolas Mahut, having won in the first round against Igor Sijsling. As a result, Gulbis dropped outside the top 75 in the ATP rankings, having failed to defend the ranking points for his semifinal appearance in 2014.

Gulbis then lost in the first round of Wimbledon to Lukáš Rosol in three sets. Having recorded a dismal 1–3 win–loss record at the first three Grand Slams of the season, it was the worst performance for Gulbis at these tournaments since 2012.

Gulbis showed signs of revival at the Rogers Cup, reaching the quarter-finals. Despite having 2 match points against world No.1 Novak Djokovic in the second set, he went on to lose the match. Gulbis had reached the quarter-final stage of at least one Masters 1000 tournament for a third season in a row.

At the US Open, Gulbis retired in the first round match against Aljaž Bedene due to injury.

==== 2016: Continued struggle with form ====
Having lost in the qualifying rounds of the first two ATP tournaments of the season in Australia in Brisbane and Sydney, Gulbis went on to lose in the round of 128 at the Australian Open against Jérémy Chardy.

Gulbis won his first match of the season against world No. 171 Quentin Halys at the 2016 Open Sud de France, but lost in the round of 16 to Richard Gasquet in straight sets, who went on to retain his title from the previous year.

Gulbis went through qualifying at the Rotterdam Open, but then lost in the round of 32 to Gaël Monfils.

Gulbis lost to Richard Gasquet for a second consecutive time in 2016 at the Open 13 in Marseille in the round of 16.

Following this came a string of losses in the first rounds of four consecutive ATP tournaments: at the BNP Paribas Open in Indian Wells, at the 2016 Miami Open, at the 2016 Barcelona Open, and the 2016 BMW Open in Munich. After that, Gulbis failed to qualify for the 2016 Mutua Madrid Open, losing to Lucas Pouille in qualifying.

Gulbis managed to break the losing streak at the 2016 Rome Master by getting through qualifying and beating Ivo Karlovic in three sets in the round of 64, but went down to Pouille in the next round for a second consecutive time (and tournament).

Gulbis defeated Lithuania's Ričardas Berankis in the first round of the 2016 Geneva Open, but lost in the round of 16 to Marin Cilic in straight sets.

Gulbis appeared resurgent at the French Open by beating Andreas Seppi, João Sousa and Jo-Wilfried Tsonga, losing his first set of the tournament only to the latter. Tsonga pulled out of the match due to injury, the second time Tsonga had to retire from a Grand Slam match against Gulbis. Gulbis then lost in the round of 16 to David Goffin in four sets. During the tournament, Gulbis cited injury of his shoulder as the cause for poor performances since 2015, having never fully recovered from it and refusing to have surgery. Before the tournament, Gulbis had split with his coach since 2012, Gunter Bresnik.

Gulbis lost to Benjamin Becker in the first round in Halle and at Wimbledon to Jack Sock in straight sets.

==== 2017: Wimbledon Third round ====
Gulbis did not play in the 2017 Australian Open and lost in qualifying in Rotterdam, Indian Wells, Miami, Barcelona, and Estoril. He lost in the first round of the 2017 Roland Garros to Marin Čilić, but made it to the third round of 2017 Wimbledon, beating Juan Martin del Potro in the second round before losing to Novak Djokovic. He made it to the second round in Bastad and the quarterfinals in Gstaad, losing to Fabio Fognini. He made it to the second round of the US Open, where he fell to Kevin Anderson. The rest of 2017 saw little success.

==== 2018: Wimbledon Fourth round, Seventh ATP final ====
Gulbis reached the fourth round of 2018 Wimbledon as a qualifier by defeating 4th seed Alexander Zverev in a five set match in the third round, before losing to Kei Nishikori in four sets. This was his best showing at this Grand Slam in his career.

Gulbis made his first ATP Tour final in four years at the Stockholm Open, losing to Stefanos Tsitsipas. This was his first loss at a final, having previously won six singles titles and two doubles titles. In 2018 Gulbis made his way back to Top 100 men's singles rankings, for the first time since the summer of 2016.

==== 2019: Dip in form and rankings ====
Gulbis started off his 2019 year with a quarterfinal appearance at the Maharashtra Open and an Australian Open match against Stan Wawrinka where he won the 1st set 6–3 but retired in the 2nd set due to back issues.

Throughout 2019, he would post a 6–17 record and his ranking would drop to 226 by the end of the year.

==== 2020–2024: Australian Open third round, severe loss of form after COVID-19 break ====
Gulbis started off his 2020 season with a 3rd round appearance at the 2020 Australian Open losing to Gaël Monfils in straight sets and his first challenger title since 2012 at the Pau Open.

After the COVID-19 pandemic had suspended tennis from March to August, it would seem that Gulbis had lost his form from early 2020. From September 2020 to February 2021, Gulbis failed to win an ATP qualifying match or even a challenger match.

Gulbis reached the third round of the qualifying competition at 2021 Wimbledon qualifying after he defeated Dmitry Popko in the first round and then 3rd seed Andrej Martin where he lost only three games. He lost to Brandon Nakashima in straight sets. He repeated this feat at the 2021 US Open qualifying where he defeated 26th seed Marc Polmans and Filip Horanský before losing to Quentin Halys in straight sets.

== Davis Cup ==
Gulbis played in three Davis Cup ties for Latvia (four singles; three doubles with Deniss Pavlovs). His participation in the tie against Monaco in September helped Latvia to qualify for the Europe/Africa Zone Group I tier of Davis Cup for the first time in its history.

In 2010, Gulbis continued to participate on the Latvian Davis Cup team, playing against Poland, where he won both of his singles rubbers.

In 2011, 2012, and 2013, he continued to play in Davis Cup competition for Latvia.

== Playing style and equipment ==
Gulbis primarily employs an offensive baseline playing style. Gulbis' most consistent shot is his backhand, which is taken with rapid pace, relatively flat execution, and is difficult to read. Gulbis is also known for his finesse shots, including the offensive topspin lob and drop shot, both of which he can strike from any position, including from deep in the court. Gulbis employs the drop shot consistently and often, sometimes to the point of derision. Gulbis plays an extremely aggressive, winner-driven game, which often leads to a high unforced error count, making his consistency an issue in tough matches, often causing him to be likened to Marat Safin.

Despite playing a style more attuned to fast surfaces, his strong showing at the 2008 French Open, 2010 Rome Masters and 2014 French Open are attributed to his powerful and flat strokes which can play through the surface.

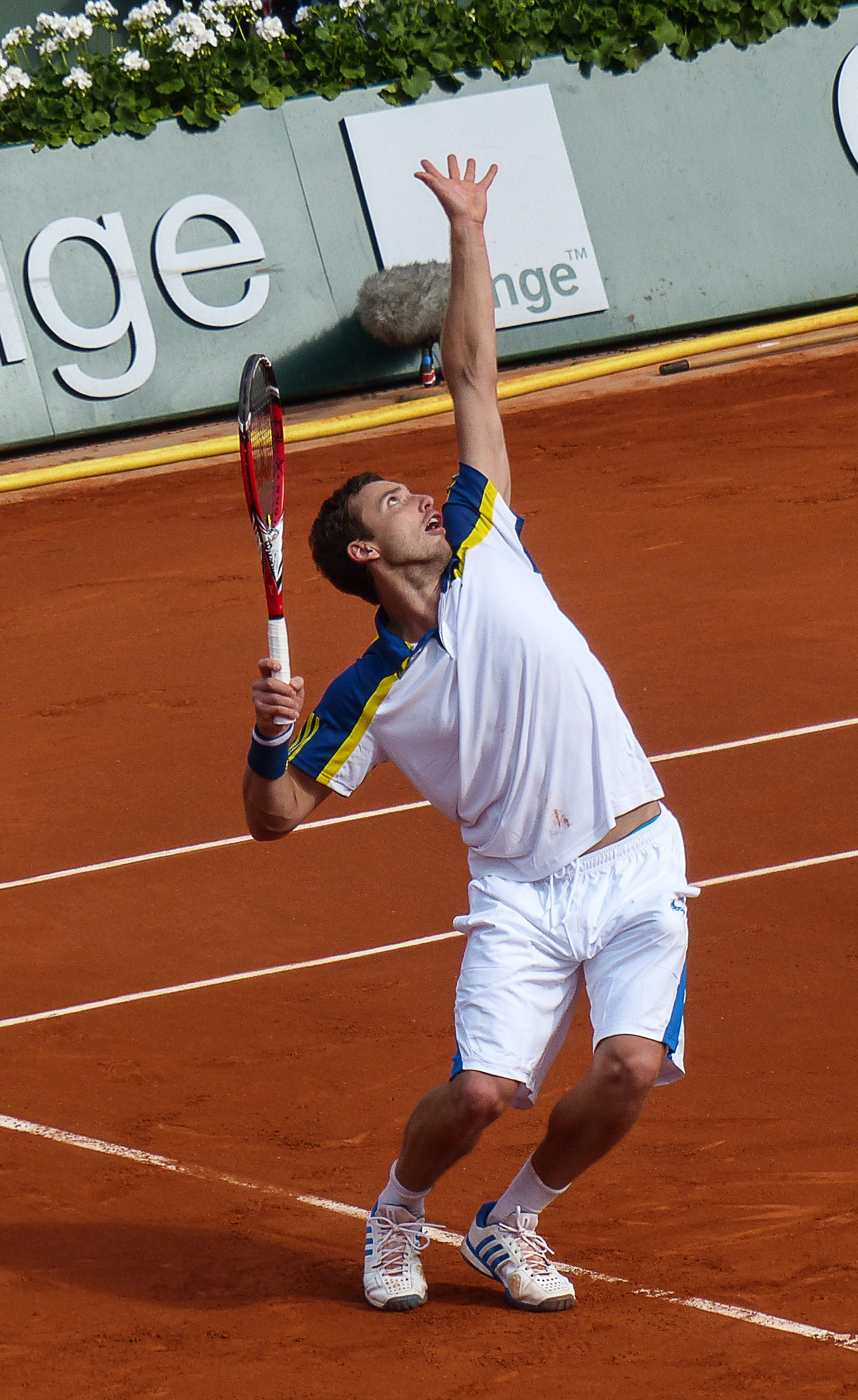
Gulbis' employs an aggressive baseline game, coupled with a powerful serve.

His aggressive baseline game is coupled with an extremely powerful serve, often reaching the upper 130's and low 140's in mph; however, Gulbis has struggled with his second serve, and often has high double fault statistics across the ATP leaderboard. Other weaknesses are his consistency and his nerves; despite a strong serve and return, Gulbis has poor break point conversion, break point save and tie-break statistics. On numerous occasions he has had strings of uncharacteristic unforced errors when serving or returning for sets or matches, as well as hitting numerous "easy" smashes well out in tough situations, something he has become known for and often jokes about in interviews. However, to his credit, he has a good record in ATP finals, winning 6 of the 7 finals he has been in for ATP events.

As of February 2013, Gulbis uses a Wilson Steam 99 paintjob racquet after switching from Head. His strings are Luxilon ALU Power 16L strung at 59/57 lbs. Gulbis uses Tourna grip on a white Hydrocontrol grip. He endorses adidas for his attire.

== Performance timelines ==
Key
W	F	SF	QF	#R	RR	Q#	P#	DNQ	A	Z#	PO	G	S	B	NMS	NTI	P	NH

(W) winner; (F) finalist; (SF) semifinalist; (QF) quarterfinalist; (#R) rounds 4, 3, 2, 1; (RR) round-robin stage; (Q#) qualification round; (P#) preliminary round; (DNQ) did not qualify; (A) absent; (Z#) Davis/Fed Cup Zonal Group (with number indication) or (PO) play-off; (G) gold, (S) silver or (B) bronze Olympic/Paralympic medal; (NMS) not a Masters tournament; (NTI) not a Tier I tournament; (P) postponed; (NH) not held; (SR) strike rate (events won / competed); (W–L) win–loss record.
To avoid confusion and double counting, these charts are updated at the conclusion of a tournament or when the player's participation has ended.

=== Singles ===
Current through the 2022 ATP Tour.

Tournament	2005	2006	2007	2008	2009	2010	2011	2012	2013	2014	2015	2016	2017	2018	2019	2020	2021	2022	2023	SR	W–L	Win%
Grand Slam tournaments
Australian Open	A	A	Q1	1R	2R	1R	1R	1R	A	2R	1R	1R	A	A	1R	3R	Q1	Q1	A	0 / 10	4–10	29%
French Open	A	A	2R	QF	2R	1R	1R	1R	2R	SF	2R	4R	1R	2R	1R	Q1	Q1	A	A	0 / 13	17–13	57%
Wimbledon	A	A	1R	2R	2R	A	1R	2R	3R	2R	1R	1R	3R	4R	1R	NH	Q3	A	A	0 / 12	11–12	48%
US Open	A	Q2	4R	2R	1R	1R	2R	2R	1R	2R	1R	A	2R	Q1	Q1	A	Q3	A	A	0 / 10	8–10	44%
Win–loss	0–0	0–0	4–3	6–4	3–4	0–3	1–4	2–4	3–3	8–4	1–4	3–3	3–3	4–2	0–3	2–1	0–0	0–0	0–0	0 / 45	40–45	47%
Olympic Games
Summer Olympics	NH			1R	NH			A	NH			A	NH				A	NH		0 / 1	0–1	0%
ATP Masters 1000
Indian Wells Masters	A	A	A	2R	2R	2R	3R	1R	4R	QF	3R	1R	Q1	A	1R	NH	Q1	A	A	0 / 10	11–10	52%
Miami Open	A	A	A	2R	1R	A	2R	1R	A	2R	2R	1R	Q1	A	1R	NH	A	A	A	0 / 8	1–8	11%
Monte-Carlo Masters	A	A	A	A	1R	2R	2R	A	2R	1R	1R	A	A	A	Q1	NH	A	A	A	0 / 6	3–6	33%
Madrid Open	A	A	Q1	2R	1R	QF	A	A	A	QF	1R	Q1	A	A	Q1	NH	A	A	A	0 / 5	7–5	58%
Italian Open	A	A	A	A	2R	SF	A	Q1	3R	3R	1R	2R	A	A	Q1	Q1	A	A	A	0 / 6	10–6	62%
Canadian Open	A	A	1R	1R	Q2	2R	3R	A	QF	2R	QF	1R	A	Q1	Q1	NH	A	A	A	0 / 8	10–8	56%
Cincinnati Masters	A	A	Q2	QF	Q1	3R	1R	Q1	1R	2R	A	A	Q2	A	A	A	A	A	A	0 / 5	6–5	55%
Shanghai Masters	NH				1R	1R	1R	A	A	1R	A	A	A	A	A	NH			A	0 / 4	0–4	0%
Paris Masters	A	A	A	A	Q1	3R	A	A	1R	A	A	A	A	A	A	A	A	A	A	0 / 2	2–2	50%
Win–loss	0–0	0–0	0–1	6–5	2–6	14–8	4–6	0–2	9–6	10–8	4–6	1–4	0–0	0–0	0–2	0–0	0–0	0–0	0–0	0 / 54	50–54	48%
Career statistics
	2005	2006	2007	2008	2009	2010	2011	2012	2013	2014	2015	2016	2017	2018	2019	2020	2021	2022	2023	Career		
Tournaments	0	1	14	21	26	21	23	17	20	23	24	14	8	6	17	2	2	0	0	239		
Titles	0	0	0	0	0	1	1	0	2	2	0	0	0	0	0	0	0	0	0	6		
Finals	0	0	0	0	0	1	1	0	2	2	0	0	0	1	0	0	0	0	0	7		
Overall win–loss	0–2	4–2	10–14	24–22	20–26	31–20	18–22	17–18	37–18	41–21	11–24	7–14	6–8	9–6	6–17	4–2	0–3	2–0	1–0	248–239		
Win %	0%	67%	42%	52%	43%	61%	45%	49%	67%	66%	31%	33%	43%	60%	26%	67%	0%	100%	100%	51%		
Year-end ranking	418	141	61	53	90	24	61	136	24	13	81	151	199	95	226	181	191	307	896			

== ATP career finals ==
=== Singles: 7 (6 titles, 1 runner-up) ===
Legend Grand Slam (0–0) ATP Finals (0–0) ATP Masters 1000 (0–0) ATP 500 Series (0–0) ATP 250 Series (6–1)	Finals by surface Hard (5–1) Clay (1–0) Grass (0–0) Carpet (0–0)

Result	W–L	Date	Tournament	Tier	Surface	Opponent	Score
Win	1–0	Feb 2010	Delray Beach Open, United States	250 Series	Hard	(Croatia) Ivo Karlović	6–2, 6–3
Win	2–0	Jul 2011	Los Angeles Open, United States	250 Series	Hard	(United States) Mardy Fish	5–7, 6–4, 6–4
Win	3–0	Mar 2013	Delray Beach Open, United States (2)	250 Series	Hard	(France) Édouard Roger-Vasselin	7–6^{(7–3)}, 6–3
Win	4–0	Sep 2013	St. Petersburg Open, Russia	250 Series	Hard (i)	(Spain) Guillermo García-López	3–6, 6–4, 6–0
Win	5–0	Feb 2014	Open 13, France	250 Series	Hard (i)	(France) Jo-Wilfried Tsonga	7–6^{(7–5)}, 6–4
Win	6–0	May 2014	Open de Nice, France	250 Series	Clay	(Argentina) Federico Delbonis	6–1, 7–6^{(7–5)}
Loss	6–1	Oct 2018	Stockholm Open, Sweden	250 Series	Hard (i)	(Greece) Stefanos Tsitsipas	4–6, 4–6

=== Doubles: 2 (2 titles) ===
Legend Grand Slam (0–0) ATP Finals (0–0) ATP Masters 1000 (0–0) ATP 500 Series (0–0) ATP 250 Series (2–0)	Finals by surface Hard (1–0) Clay (1–0) Grass (0–0) Carpet (0–0)

Result	W–L	Date	Tournament	Tier	Surface	Partner	Opponents	Score
Win	1–0	Apr 2008	US Clay Court Championships, United States	250 Series	Clay	(Germany) Rainer Schüttler	(Uruguay) Pablo Cuevas (Spain) Marcel Granollers	7–5, 7–6^{(7–3)}
Win	2–0	Jul 2009	Indianapolis Championships, United States	250 Series	Hard	(Russia) Dmitry Tursunov	(Australia) Ashley Fisher (Australia) Jordan Kerr	6–4, 3–6, [11–9]

== ATP Challenger and ITF Futures finals ==
=== Singles: 14 (8–6) ===
Legend
ATP Challengers (5–4)
ITF Futures (3–2)

Result	W–L	Date	Tournament	Tier	Surface	Opponent	Score
Win	1–0	Sep 2005	Germany F15, Friedberg	Futures	Clay	(Germany) Marcel Zimmermann	6–4, 6–0
Win	2–0	Jan 2006	Austria F1, Bergheim	Futures	Clay	(Switzerland) Jean-Claude Scherrer	7–6^{(7–2)}, 3–6, 6–4
Win	3–0	Mar 2006	Switzerland F2, Leuggern	Futures	Carpet (i)	(Germany) Tobias Klein	7–6^{(7–4)}, 6–4
Loss	3–1	Mar 2006	France F5, Poitiers	Futures	Hard (i)	(Belgium) Stefan Wauters	4–6, 5–7
Loss	3–2	Apr 2006	Sweden F1, Malmö	Futures	Hard (i)	(Austria) Stefan Wiespeiner	2–6, 4–6
Loss	0–1	Jul 2006	Oberstaufen, Germany	Challenger	Clay	(Czech Republic) Michal Tabara	6–7^{(5–7)}, 3–6
Loss	0–2	Jul 2006	Tampere, Finland	Challenger	Clay	(Germany) Florian Mayer	6–7^{(4–7)}, 6–2, 3–6
Win	1–2	Nov 2006	Eckental, Germany	Challenger	Carpet (i)	(Germany) Philipp Petzschner	6–3, 6–0
Win	2–2	Feb 2007	Besançon, France	Challenger	Hard (i)	(France) Édouard Roger-Vasselin	6–4, 3–6, 6–4
Win	3–2	Mar 2007	Sarajevo, Bosnia & Herzegovina	Challenger	Hard (i)	(Czech Republic) Jan Mertl	4–6, 6–4, 7–6^{(7–2)}
Win	4–2	Oct 2007	Mons, Belgium	Challenger	Hard (i)	(Belgium) Kristof Vliegen	7–5, 6–3
Loss	4–3	Nov 2012	Eckental, Germany	Challenger	Carpet (i)	(Germany) Daniel Brands	6–7^{(0–7)}, 3–6
Win	5–3	Mar 2020	Pau, France	Challenger	Hard (i)	(Poland) Jerzy Janowicz	6–3, 6–4
Loss	5–4	Jul 2022	Zug, Switzerland	Challenger	Clay	(Switzerland) Dominic Stricker	7–5, 1–6, 3–6

=== Doubles: 4 (3–1) ===
Legend
ATP Challengers (3–1)
ITF Futures (0–0)

Result	W–L	Date	Tournament	Tier	Surface	Partner	Opponents	Score
Win	1–0	Jul 2006	Oberstaufen, Germany	Challenger	Clay	(Germany) Mischa Zverev	(Romania) Teodor-Dacian Crăciun (Romania) Gabriel Moraru	6–1, 6–1
Win	2–0	Oct 2006	Aachen, Germany	Challenger	Carpet (i)	(Germany) Mischa Zverev	(Poland) Tomasz Bednarek (Georgia (country)) Irakli Labadze	6–7^{(5–7)}, 6–4, [10–8]
Loss	2–1	Nov 2006	Helsinki, Finland	Challenger	Hard (i)	(Latvia) Deniss Pavlovs	(Netherlands) Martijn van Haasteren (Netherlands) Jasper Smit	6–7^{(6–8)}, 2–6
Win	3–1	Mar 2007	Sarajevo, Bosnia & Herzegovina	Challenger	Hard (i)	(Latvia) Deniss Pavlovs	(Czech Republic) Jan Mertl (Czech Republic) Lukáš Rosol	6–4, 6–3

== Record against top-10 players ==
Gulbis' match record against players who were ranked world No. 10 or higher at the time is as follows, with those who have been No. 1 in boldface:

- (Czech Republic) Radek Štěpánek 4–0
- (Italy) Fabio Fognini 4–2
- (United States) John Isner 4–3
- (Spain) Roberto Bautista Agut 3–1
- (United States) James Blake 3–1
- (Argentina) Juan Martín del Potro 3–3
- (France) Jo-Wilfried Tsonga 3–3
- (Czech Republic) Tomáš Berdych 3–4
- (Russia) Mikhail Youzhny 3–5
- (Sweden) Joachim Johansson 2–0
- (Chile) Nicolás Massú 2–0
- (Bulgaria) Grigor Dimitrov 2–1
- (United States) Jack Sock 2–1
- (Serbia) Janko Tipsarević 2–2
- (Switzerland) **Roger Federer** 2–3
- (Germany) Tommy Haas 2–4
- (Cyprus) Marcos Baghdatis 2–5
- (Argentina) Juan Monaco 2–5
- (United Kingdom) Tim Henman 1–0
- (Poland) Hubert Hurkacz 1–0
- (Ecuador) Nicolás Lapentti 1–0
- (Austria) Jürgen Melzer 1–0
- (Spain) Tommy Robredo 1–0
- (Germany) Rainer Schüttler 1–0
- (Canada) Denis Shapovalov 1–0
- (Spain) Nicolás Almagro 1–1
- (Croatia) Mario Ančić 1–1
- (South Africa) Kevin Anderson 1–1
- (Canada) Félix Auger-Aliassime 1–1
- (France) Arnaud Clément 1–1
- (Spain) **Juan Carlos Ferrero** 1–1
- (Germany) Nicolas Kiefer 1–1
- (Spain) **Carlos Moyá** 1–1
- (Germany) Alexander Zverev 1–1
- (United States) Mardy Fish 1–2
- (Belgium) David Goffin 1–2
- (Croatia) Marin Čilić 1–3
- (Austria) Dominic Thiem 1–3
- (France) Richard Gasquet 1–4
- (Spain) Fernando Verdasco 1–4
- (United Kingdom) **Andy Murray** 1–5
- (Serbia) **Novak Djokovic** 1–7
- (Italy) Matteo Berrettini 0–1
- (Argentina) Guillermo Cañas 0–1
- (Chile) Fernando González 0–1
- (Russia) Karen Khachanov 0–1
- (Croatia) Ivan Ljubičić 0–1
- (Norway) Casper Ruud 0–1
- (Argentina) Diego Schwartzman 0–1
- (Sweden) Robin Söderling 0–1
- (Greece) Stefanos Tsitsipas 0–1
- (Argentina) David Nalbandian 0–2
- (France) Lucas Pouille 0–2
- (Russia) **Marat Safin** 0–2
- (Switzerland) Stan Wawrinka 0–2
- (Russia) Nikolay Davydenko 0–3
- (France) Gaël Monfils 0–3
- (Japan) Kei Nishikori 0–3
- (United States) **Andy Roddick** 0–3
- (France) Gilles Simon 0–3
- (Spain) David Ferrer 0–4
- (Canada) Milos Raonic 0–4
- (Spain) **Rafael Nadal** 0–7

* Statistics correct as of 3 October 2023.

== Wins over top-10 players ==
- Gulbis has a 19–50 record against players who were, at the time the match was played, ranked in the top 10.

Season	2007	2008	2009	2010	2011	2012	2013	2014	2015	2016	2017	2018	Total
Wins	1	2	1	2	1	1	3	5	0	1	0	2	19

#	Player	Rank	Event	Surface	Rd	Score	EGR
2007
1.	(Spain) Tommy Robredo	8	US Open, New York, United States	Hard	3R	6–1, 6–3, 6–2	88
2008
2.	(United States) James Blake	8	French Open, Paris, France	Clay	2R	7–6^{(7–2)}, 3–6, 7–5, 6–3	80
3.	(United States) James Blake	8	Cincinnati, United States	Hard	3R	6–4, 1–6, 6–3	53
2009
4.	(Serbia) Novak Djokovic	3	Brisbane, Australia	Hard	1R	6–4, 6–4	53
2010
5.	(Switzerland) Roger Federer	1	Rome, Italy	Clay	2R	2–6, 6–1, 7–5	40
6.	(Russia) Mikhail Youzhny	10	Paris, France	Hard (i)	2R	6–4, 3–0 ret.	26
2011
7.	(United States) Mardy Fish	9	Los Angeles, United States	Hard	F	5–7, 6–4, 6–4	84
2012
8.	(Czech Republic) Tomáš Berdych	7	Wimbledon, London, United Kingdom	Grass	1R	7–6^{(7–5)}, 7–6^{(7–4)}, 7–6^{(7–4)}	87
2013
9.	(Serbia) Janko Tipsarević	9	Indian Wells, United States	Hard	2R	6–2, 6–0	67
10.	(France) Jo-Wilfried Tsonga	7	Wimbledon, London, United Kingdom	Grass	2R	3–6, 6–3, 6–3, ret.	39
11.	(United Kingdom) Andy Murray	2	Montreal, Canada	Hard	3R	6–4, 6–3	38
2014
12.	(Argentina) Juan Martín del Potro	4	Rotterdam, Netherlands	Hard (i)	QF	6–3, 6–4	24
13.	(France) Richard Gasquet	9	Marseille, France	Hard (i)	SF	6–3, 6–2	23
14.	(France) Jo-Wilfried Tsonga	10	Marseille, France	Hard (i)	F	7–6^{(7–5)}, 6–4	23
15.	(Switzerland) Roger Federer	4	French Open, Paris, France	Clay	4R	6–7^{(5–7)}, 7–6^{(7–3)}, 6–2, 4–6, 6–3	17
16.	(Czech Republic) Tomáš Berdych	6	French Open, Paris, France	Clay	QF	6–3, 6–2, 6–4	17
2016
17.	(France) Jo-Wilfried Tsonga	7	French Open, Paris, France	Clay	3R	2–5, ret.	80
2018
18.	(Germany) Alexander Zverev	3	Wimbledon, London, United Kingdom	Grass	3R	7–6^{(7–2)}, 4–6, 5–7, 6–3, 6–0	138
19.	(United States) John Isner	10	Stockholm, Sweden	Hard (i)	SF	1–6, 6–3, 6–3	145

== Records ==
Event	Years	Record accomplished	Players matched
ATP Tour	2010–14	First six tournament finals won	Ugo Humbert; Martin Kližan

Awards
Preceded by Poļina Jeļizarova	Latvian Rising Sportspersonality of the Year; 2006	Succeeded by Aiga Grabuste
