= 2018 Stockholm Open =

- Date: 15–21 October
- Edition: 50th
- Category: ATP World Tour 250 series
- Draw: 28S / 16D
- Prize money: €612,755
- Surface: Hard / indoor
- Location: Stockholm, Sweden
- Venue: Kungliga tennishallen

Champions

Singles
- (Greece) Stefanos Tsitsipas

Doubles
- (United Kingdom) Luke Bambridge / (United Kingdom) Jonny O'Mara
- Stockholm Open

The 2018 Stockholm Open (also known as the Intrum Stockholm Open for sponsorship purposes) was a professional men's tennis tournament played on indoor hard courts. It was the 50th edition of the tournament, and part of the ATP World Tour 250 series of the 2018 ATP World Tour. It took place at the Kungliga tennishallen in Stockholm, Sweden from 15 to 21 October 2018. Third-seeded Stefanos Tsitsipas won the singles title.

== Finals ==
=== Singles ===
- (Greece) Stefanos Tsitsipas defeated (Latvia) Ernests Gulbis, 6–4, 6–4

=== Doubles ===
- (United Kingdom) Luke Bambridge / (United Kingdom) Jonny O'Mara defeated (New Zealand) Marcus Daniell / (Netherlands) Wesley Koolhof, 7–5, 7–6^{(10–8)}

== Singles main-draw entrants ==
=== Seeds ===
Country	Player	Rank^{1}	Seed
USA	John Isner	10	1
ITA	Fabio Fognini	13	2
GRE	Stefanos Tsitsipas	15	3
USA	Jack Sock	17	4
FRA	Lucas Pouille	18	5
KOR	Chung Hyeon	26	6
CAN	Denis Shapovalov	29	7
ESP	Fernando Verdasco	30	8

- ^{1} Rankings are as of October 8, 2018

=== Other entrants ===
The following players received wildcards into the singles main draw:

- (South Korea) Chung Hyeon
- (Sweden) Elias Ymer
- (Sweden) Mikael Ymer

The following players received entry from the qualifying draw:

- (Latvia) Ernests Gulbis
- (Germany) Oscar Otte
- (Canada) Peter Polansky
- (Australia) Alexei Popyrin

The following player received entry as a lucky loser:

- (Estonia) Jürgen Zopp

=== Withdrawals ===
Before the tournament

- (Germany) Peter Gojowczyk → replaced by (Estonia) Jürgen Zopp

=== Retirements ===
- (South Korea) Chung Hyeon

== Doubles main-draw entrants ==
=== Seeds ===
Country	Player	Country	Player	Rank^{1}	Seed
ESP	Marc López	PAK	Aisam-ul-Haq Qureshi	73	1
USA	Jack Sock	USA	Jackson Withrow	88	2
NZL	Marcus Daniell	NED	Wesley Koolhof	93	3
GBR	Ken Skupski	GBR	Neal Skupski	97	4

- Rankings are as of October 8, 2018

=== Other entrants ===
The following pairs received wildcards into the doubles main draw:

- (Sweden) Markus Eriksson / (Sweden) André Göransson
- (Sweden) Elias Ymer / (Sweden) Mikael Ymer
