= 2016 Nottingham Open =

- Date: 18–25 June (men); 6–12 June (women)
- Edition: 21st (men); 9th (women)
- Category: WTA International (women); ATP World Tour 250 (men)
- Draw: 48S / 16D (men); 32S / 16D (women)
- Prize money: € (men) $250,000 (women)
- Surface: Grass
- Location: Nottingham, United Kingdom
- Venue: Nottingham Tennis Centre

Champions

Men's singles
- (United States) Steve Johnson

Women's singles
- (Czech Republic) Karolína Plíšková

Men's doubles
- (United Kingdom) Dominic Inglot / (Canada) Daniel Nestor

Women's doubles
- (Czech Republic) Andrea Hlaváčková / (China) Peng Shuai
- Nottingham Open

The 2016 Nottingham Open (known for sponsorship reasons as the Aegon Open Nottingham) was a combined men's and women's tennis tournament played on outdoor grass courts. It was the 9th edition of the event for the women and the 21st edition for the men. It was classified as a WTA International tournament on the 2016 WTA Tour and as an ATP World Tour 250 series tournament on the 2016 ATP World Tour. The event took place at the Nottingham Tennis Centre in Nottingham, United Kingdom from 6 to 12 June 2016 for the women, and from 20 to 25 June 2016 for the men.

== ATP singles main-draw entrants ==
=== Seeds ===
Country	Player	Rank^{1}	Seed
RSA	Kevin Anderson	20	1
URU	Pablo Cuevas	26	2
POR	João Sousa	30	3
UKR	Alexandr Dolgopolov	31	4
USA	Sam Querrey	32	5
USA	Steve Johnson	39	6
ITA	Andreas Seppi	40	7
LUX	Gilles Müller	41	8
CYP	Marcos Baghdatis	42	9
ESP	Pablo Carreño Busta	44	10
CAN	Vasek Pospisil	46	11
ITA	Paolo Lorenzi	48	12
ARG	Guido Pella	52	13
ESP	Fernando Verdasco	53	14
KAZ	Mikhail Kukushkin	55	15
LTU	Ričardas Berankis	56	16

- ^{1} Rankings are as of 13 June 2016.

=== Other entrants ===
The following players received wildcards into the main draw:

- (United Kingdom) Liam Broady
- (United Kingdom) Brydan Klein
- (United Kingdom) Alexander Ward
- (United Kingdom) James Ward

The following player received entry using a protected ranking:

- (France) Julien Benneteau

The following players received entry from the qualifying draw:

- (Canada) Frank Dancevic
- (United States) Ernesto Escobedo
- (Czech Republic) Jan Hernych
- (France) Stéphane Robert

=== Withdrawals ===
Before the tournament

- (Spain) Iñigo Cervantes →replaced by (Russia) Evgeny Donskoy
- (Argentina) Federico Delbonis →replaced by (United Kingdom) Kyle Edmund
- (Spain) Marcel Granollers →replaced by (Dominican Republic) Víctor Estrella Burgos
- (Ukraine) Illya Marchenko →replaced by (United Kingdom) Daniel Evans
- (France) Paul-Henri Mathieu →replaced by (Kazakhstan) Mikhail Kukushkin
- (Argentina) Leonardo Mayer →replaced by (Australia) Jordan Thompson

== ATP doubles main-draw entrants ==
=== Seeds ===
Country	Player	Country	Player	Rank^{1}	Seed
CRO	Ivan Dodig	BRA	Marcelo Melo	23	1
GBR	Dominic Inglot	CAN	Daniel Nestor	43	2
PHI	Treat Huey	BLR	Max Mirnyi	51	3
COL	Juan Sebastián Cabal	COL	Robert Farah	54	4

- ^{1} Rankings are as of 13 June 2016.

=== Other entrants ===
The following pairs received wildcards into the doubles main draw:

- (United Kingdom) Jonathan Marray / (Canada) Adil Shamasdin
- (United Kingdom) Ken Skupski / (United Kingdom) Neal Skupski

== WTA singles main-draw entrants ==
=== Seeds ===
Country	Player	Rank^{1}	Seed
CZE	Karolína Plíšková	19	1
GBR	Johanna Konta	21	2
DEN	Caroline Wozniacki	34	3
PUR	Monica Puig	53	4
BEL	Yanina Wickmayer	54	5
GBR	Heather Watson	56	6
GER	Mona Barthel	66	7
USA	Christina McHale	67	8

- ^{1} Rankings are as of 23 May 2016.

=== Other entrants ===
The following players received wildcards into the main draw:

- (United Kingdom) Freya Christie
- (Czech Republic) Karolína Plíšková
- (United Kingdom) Laura Robson

The following players received entry using a protected ranking:

- (United States) Victoria Duval
- (China) Peng Shuai

The following players received entry from the qualifying draw:

- (Australia) Ashleigh Barty
- (Portugal) Michelle Larcher de Brito
- (United Kingdom) Tara Moore
- (China) Zhang Kailin

The following players received entry as lucky losers:

- (Czech Republic) Andrea Hlaváčková
- (Austria) Tamira Paszek

=== Withdrawals ===
Before the tournament

- (Belarus) Victoria Azarenka → replaced by (United States) Anna Tatishvili
- (Czech Republic) Petra Cetkovská → replaced by (United States) Lauren Davis
- (United States) Irina Falconi → replaced by (United States) Alison Riske
- (United States) Madison Keys → replaced by (United States) Victoria Duval
- (Croatia) Ana Konjuh → replaced by (Czech Republic) Andrea Hlaváčková
- (Romania) Monica Niculescu → replaced by (Austria) Tamira Paszek
- (Ukraine) Lesia Tsurenko → replaced by (Poland) Magda Linette

=== Retirements ===
- (Slovakia) Magdaléna Rybáriková

== WTA doubles main-draw entrants ==
=== Seeds ===
Country	Player	Country	Player	Rank^{1}	Seed
TPE	Chan Hao-ching	TPE	Chan Yung-jan	12	1
CHN	Xu Yifan	CHN	Zheng Saisai	44	2
CHN	Han Xinyun	CHN	Wang Yafan	139	3
CAN	Gabriela Dabrowski	CHN	Yang Zhaoxuan	143	4

- ^{1} Rankings are as of 23 May 2016.

=== Other entrants ===
The following pair received a wildcard into the doubles main draw:

- (United Kingdom) Freya Christie / (United Kingdom) Laura Robson

=== Withdrawals ===
During the tournament

- (Czech Republic) Karolína Plíšková

== Champions ==
=== Men's singles ===
- (United States) Steve Johnson def. (Uruguay) Pablo Cuevas, 7–6^{(7–5)}, 7–5

=== Women's singles ===
- (Czech Republic) Karolína Plíšková def. (United States) Alison Riske, 7–6^{(10–8)}, 7–5

=== Men's doubles ===
- (United Kingdom) Dominic Inglot / (Canada) Daniel Nestor def. (Croatia) Ivan Dodig / (Brazil) Marcelo Melo, 7–5, 7–6^{(7–4)}

=== Women's doubles ===
- (Czech Republic) Andrea Hlaváčková / (China) Peng Shuai def. (Canada) Gabriela Dabrowski / (China) Yang Zhaoxuan, 7–5, 3–6, [10–7]
