= 2016 Citi Open – Men's singles =

Men's singles
- 2016 Citi Open

Final
- Champion: (France) Gaël Monfils
- Runner-up: (Croatia) Ivo Karlović
- Score: 5–7, 7–6^{(8–6)}, 6–4

Details
- Draw: 48 (6Q / 4WC)
- Seeds: 16

Events
Singles	men	women
Doubles	men	women
- Washington Open

Kei Nishikori was the defending champion, but chose not to participate this year.
Second-seeded Gaël Monfils won the title, defeating Ivo Karlović in the final: 5–7, 7–6^{(8–6)}, 6–4.

== Seeds ==
All seeds receive a bye into the second round.

1. (United States) John Isner (quarterfinals)
2. (France) Gaël Monfils (champion)
3. (Australia) Bernard Tomic (third round)
4. (France) Benoît Paire (quarterfinals)
5. (United States) Steve Johnson (semifinals)
6. (United States) Jack Sock (quarterfinals)
7. (Germany) Alexander Zverev (semifinals)
8. (United States) Sam Querrey (quarterfinals)

9. (South Africa) Kevin Anderson (second round)
10. (Serbia) Viktor Troicki (second round)
11. (Ukraine) Alexandr Dolgopolov (third round)
12. (Bulgaria) Grigor Dimitrov (second round)
13. (Croatia) Ivo Karlović (final)
14. (Luxembourg) Gilles Müller (third round)
15. (Cyprus) Marcos Baghdatis (third round)
16. (Croatia) Borna Ćorić (third round)

Click on the seed number of a player to go to their draw section.

== Draw ==
Key

- Q = Qualifier
- WC = Wild card
- LL = Lucky loser
- Alt = Alternate
- ITF = ITF entry
- PR = Protected ranking
- SR = Special ranking
- SE = Special exempt
- JE = Junior exempt
- JR = Junior Accelerator Programme entrant
- CO = College Accelerator Programme entrant
- NG = Next Gen Accelerator Program entrant
- w/o = Walkover
- r = Retired
- d = Defaulted

=== Finals ===
Quarterfinals
1	(United States) John Isner	6^{7}	6^{15}
5	(United States) Steve Johnson	7^{9}	7^{17}
13	(Croatia) Ivo Karlović	7^{7}	7^{8}
6	(United States) Jack Sock	6^{4}	6^{6}
7/WC	(Germany) Alexander Zverev	6	6
4	(France) Benoît Paire	1	3
8	(United States) Sam Querrey	4	6	1
2	(France) Gaël Monfils	6	3	6

Semifinals
5	(United States) Steve Johnson	4	4
13	(Croatia) Ivo Karlović	6	6
7/WC	(Germany) Alexander Zverev	4	0
2	(France) Gaël Monfils	6	6

Final
13	(Croatia) Ivo Karlović	7	6^{6}	4
2	(France) Gaël Monfils	5	7^{8}	6

=== Top half ===
==== Section 1 ====
First round
Q	(Australia) J Duckworth	7	6
(United States) T Smyczek	5	1
(United States) D Kudla	5	0
(Australia) J Millman	7	6
Q	(United States) R Harrison	7^{7}	6
(France) S Robert	6^{1}	3
(France) A Mannarino	7^{7}	7
WC	(United States) F Tiafoe	6^{4}	5

Second round
1	(United States) J Isner	6	6
Q	(Australia) J Duckworth	3	4
(Australia) J Millman	2	4
15	(Cyprus) M Baghdatis	6	6
10	(Serbia) V Troicki	6^{4}	4
Q	(United States) R Harrison	7^{7}	6
(France) A Mannarino	3	4
5	(United States) S Johnson	6	6

Third round
1	(United States) J Isner	7^{7}	6
15	(Cyprus) M Baghdatis	6^{3}	2
Q	(United States) R Harrison	4	4
5	(United States) S Johnson	6	6

Quarterfinals
1	(United States) J Isner	6^{7}	6^{15}
5	(United States) S Johnson	7^{9}	7^{17}

==== Section 2 ====
First round
(United States) D Young	6	3	6
Q	(United States) E Escobedo	4	6	3
(Australia) S Groth	6^{3}	6^{5}
PR	(United States) B Baker	7^{7}	7^{7}
(United Kingdom) D Evans	6	6
(Germany) B Becker	2	1
(Slovakia) L Lacko	7^{7}	4	6
WC	(Canada) D Shapovalov	6^{3}	6	4

Second round
3	(Australia) B Tomic	7^{7}	6
(United States) D Young	6^{4}	3
PR	(United States) B Baker	3	6^{4}
13	(Croatia) I Karlović	6	7^{7}
12	(Bulgaria) G Dimitrov	4	4
(United Kingdom) D Evans	6	6
(Slovakia) L Lacko	6^{1}	4
6	(United States) J Sock	7^{7}	6

Third round
3	(Australia) B Tomic	6^{4}	3
13	(Croatia) I Karlović	7^{7}	6
(United Kingdom) D Evans	1	5
6	(United States) J Sock	6	7

Quarterfinals
13	(Croatia) I Karlović	7^{7}	7^{8}
6	(United States) J Sock	6^{4}	6^{6}

=== Bottom half ===
==== Section 3 ====
First round
(Israel) D Sela	4	3
(United States) T Fritz	6	6
WC	(United States) R Opelka	7^{7}	6^{4}	6^{3}
(Tunisia) M Jaziri	6^{4}	7^{7}	7^{7}
(Japan) Y Nishioka	6	4
(Croatia) I Dodig	2	2^{r}
Q	(France) V Millot	7	2	4
Q	(United States) J Donaldson	5	6	6

Second round
7/WC	(Germany) A Zverev	6	6
(United States) T Fritz	4	2
(Tunisia) M Jaziri	5	6	7^{7}
9	(South Africa) K Anderson	7	4	6^{3}
14	(Luxembourg) G Müller	6	6
(Japan) Y Nishioka	4	1
Q	(United States) J Donaldson	0	5
4	(France) B Paire	6	7

Third round
7/WC	(Germany) A Zverev	6	5	6
(Tunisia) M Jaziri	2	7	2
14	(Luxembourg) G Müller	2	6	6^{4}
4	(France) B Paire	6	3	7^{7}

Quarterfinals
7/WC	(Germany) A Zverev	6	6
4	(France) B Paire	1	3

==== Section 4 ====
First round
Q	(United States) A Kuznetsov	6	2	4
(United States) B Fratangelo	4	6	6
(Australia) J Thompson	6	6
(Dominican Republic) V Estrella Burgos	3	2
(Japan) Y Sugita	1	6	7^{7}
(Canada) V Pospisil	6	2	6^{4}
(United States) A Krajicek	1	6^{3}
(Chinese Taipei) Y-h Lu	6	7^{7}

Second round
8	(United States) S Querrey	6^{5}	6	6
(United States) B Fratangelo	7^{7}	4	4
(Australia) J Thompson	4	6	6^{4}
11	(Ukraine) A Dolgopolov	6	1	7^{7}
16	(Croatia) B Ćorić	6	6
(Japan) Y Sugita	4	4
(Chinese Taipei) Y-h Lu	3	2
2	(France) G Monfils	6	6

Third round
8	(United States) S Querrey	7^{7}	6
11	(Ukraine) A Dolgopolov	6^{5}	3
16	(Croatia) B Ćorić	2	3
2	(France) G Monfils	6	6

Quarterfinals
8	(United States) S Querrey	4	6	1
2	(France) G Monfils	6	3	6

== Qualifying ==
=== Seeds ===
The top four seeds received a bye into the qualifying competition.

1. (United States) Dennis Novikov (qualifying competition)
2. (France) Vincent Millot (qualified)
3. (United States) Jared Donaldson (qualified)
4. (United States) Ryan Harrison (qualified)
5. (Australia) Matthew Barton (qualifying competition)
6. (Australia) James Duckworth (qualified)
7. (United States) Alexander Sarkissian (qualifying competition)
8. (Israel) Amir Weintraub (qualifying competition)
9. (Colombia) Alejandro Falla (qualifying competition, retired)
10. (United States) Ernesto Escobedo (qualified)
11. (Australia) Marinko Matosevic (qualifying competition)
12. (United States) Alex Kuznetsov (qualified)

=== Qualifiers ===
1. (United States) Ernesto Escobedo
2. (France) Vincent Millot
3. (United States) Jared Donaldson
4. (United States) Ryan Harrison
5. (United States) Alex Kuznetsov
6. (Australia) James Duckworth

=== Qualifying draw ===
==== First qualifier ====
First round				Qualifying competition
				1	(United States) Dennis Novikov	6^{3}	4
WC	(United States) Leon Vessels	1	1	10	(United States) Ernesto Escobedo	7^{7}	6
10	(United States) Ernesto Escobedo	6	6

==== Second qualifier ====
First round					Qualifying competition
					2	(France) Vincent Millot	6^{3}	7	4
	(United States) Mackenzie McDonald	3	6	6^{4}	9	(Colombia) Alejandro Falla	7^{7}	5	1^{r}
9	(Colombia) Alejandro Falla	6	3	7^{7}

==== Third qualifier ====
First round				Qualifying competition
				3	(United States) Jared Donaldson	7^{11}	6
Alt	(United States) Scott Lipsky	1	0	11	(Australia) Marinko Matosevic	6^{9}	4
11	(Australia) Marinko Matosevic	6	6

==== Fourth qualifier ====
First round				Qualifying competition
				4	(United States) Ryan Harrison	6	6
WC	(United States) Ryan Shane	4	2	8	(Israel) Amir Weintraub	4	3
8	(Israel) Amir Weintraub	6	6

==== Fifth qualifier ====
First round
5	(Australia) Matthew Barton	6	6
WC	(United States) Nikita-Girey Demir	0	1
Alt	(United States) Eric Butorac	2	2
12	(United States) Alex Kuznetsov	6	6

Qualifying competition
5	(Australia) Matthew Barton	4	3
12	(United States) Alex Kuznetsov	6	6

==== Sixth qualifier ====
First round
6	(Australia) James Duckworth	6	6
WC	(United States) Ulises Blanch	1	4
(United States) Nathan Pasha	1	1
7	(United States) Alexander Sarkissian	6	6

Qualifying competition
6	(Australia) James Duckworth	4	7^{7}	6
7	(United States) Alexander Sarkissian	6	6^{5}	2
