= 2016 Citi Open =

- Date: July 18–24
- Edition: 48th (men) / 6th (women)
- Category: ATP World Tour 500 (men); WTA International (women)
- Surface: Hard
- Location: Washington, D.C., United States
- Venue: William H.G. FitzGerald Tennis Center

Champions

Men's singles
- (France) Gaël Monfils

Women's singles
- (Belgium) Yanina Wickmayer

Men's doubles
- (Canada) Daniel Nestor / (France) Édouard Roger-Vasselin

Women's doubles
- (Romania) Monica Niculescu / (Belgium) Yanina Wickmayer
- Washington Open

The 2016 Citi Open was a tennis tournament played on outdoor hard courts. It was the 48th edition (for the men) and the 6th edition (for the women) of the Washington Open. The event was part of the ATP World Tour 500 series of the 2016 ATP World Tour, and of the WTA International tournaments of the 2016 WTA Tour. It took place at the William H.G. FitzGerald Tennis Center in Washington, D.C., United States, from July 18 to July 24, 2016. Gaël Monfils and Yanina Wickmayer won the singles titles.

== Finals ==
=== Men's singles ===
- (France) Gaël Monfils defeated (Croatia) Ivo Karlović, 5–7, 7–6^{(8–6)}, 6–4

=== Women's singles ===
- (Belgium) Yanina Wickmayer defeated (United States) Lauren Davis, 6–4, 6–2

=== Men's doubles ===
- (Canada) Daniel Nestor / (France) Édouard Roger-Vasselin defeated (Poland) Łukasz Kubot / (Austria) Alexander Peya, 7–6^{(7–3)}, 7–6^{(7–4)}

=== Women's doubles ===
- (Romania) Monica Niculescu / (Belgium) Yanina Wickmayer defeated (Japan) Shuko Aoyama / (Japan) Risa Ozaki, 6–4, 6–3

== Points and prize money ==
=== Point distribution ===
Event	W	F	SF	QF	Round of 16	Round of 32	Round of 64	Q	Q2	Q1
Men's singles	500	300	180	90	45	20	0	10	4	0
Men's doubles	500	300	180	90	0	—N/a	—N/a	10	—N/a	0
Women's singles	280	180	110	60	30	1	—N/a	18	12	1
Women's doubles	280	180	110	60	1	—N/a	—N/a	—N/a	—N/a	—N/a

=== Prize money ===
Event	W	F	SF	QF	Round of 16	Round of 32	Round of 64^{1}	Q2	Q1
Men's singles	$348,200	$165,555	$78,835	$39,420	$19,725	$10,550	$6,015	$1,205	$615
Men's doubles *	$108,250	$51,470	$25,370	$13,020	$6,780	—N/a	—N/a	—N/a	—N/a
Women's singles	$43,000	$21,400	$11,500	$6,200	$3,420	$2,220	—N/a	$1,285	$750
Women's doubles *	$12,300	$6,400	$3,435	$1,820	$960	—N/a	—N/a	—N/a	—N/a

_{^{1} Qualifiers prize money is also the Round of 64 prize money}
_{* per team}

== ATP singles main-draw entrants ==
=== Seeds ===
Country	Player	Rank^{1}	Seed
USA	John Isner	16	1
FRA	Gaël Monfils	17	2
AUS	Bernard Tomic	19	3
FRA	Benoît Paire	23	4
USA	Steve Johnson	25	5
USA	Jack Sock	26	6
GER	Alexander Zverev	27	7
USA	Sam Querrey	29	8
RSA	Kevin Anderson	31	9
SRB	Viktor Troicki	32	10
UKR	Alexandr Dolgopolov	33	11
BUL	Grigor Dimitrov	37	12
CRO	Ivo Karlović	38	13
LUX	Gilles Müller	39	14
CYP	Marcos Baghdatis	43	15
CRO	Borna Ćorić	54	16

- ^{1} Rankings are as of July 11, 2016

=== Other entrants ===
The following players received wild cards into the main singles draw:

- (United States) Reilly Opelka
- (Canada) Denis Shapovalov
- (United States) Frances Tiafoe
- (Germany) Alexander Zverev

The following player received entry using a protected ranking into the main draw:

- (United States) Brian Baker

The following players received entry from the singles qualifying draw:

- (Australia) James Duckworth
- (United States) Jared Donaldson
- (United States) Ernesto Escobedo
- (United States) Ryan Harrison
- (United States) Alex Kuznetsov
- (France) Vincent Millot

=== Withdrawals ===
Before the tournament

- (Lithuania) Ričardas Berankis →replaced by (United States) Bjorn Fratangelo
- (Czech Republic) Tomáš Berdych →replaced by (Japan) Yūichi Sugita
- (Latvia) Ernests Gulbis →replaced by (Australia) Sam Groth
- (Argentina) Juan Martín del Potro →replaced by (Germany) Benjamin Becker
- (Australia) Nick Kyrgios →replaced by (Japan) Yoshihito Nishioka
- (United States) Rajeev Ram →replaced by (Slovakia) Lukáš Lacko

=== Retirements ===
- (Croatia) Ivan Dodig

== ATP doubles main-draw entrants ==
=== Seeds ===
Country	Player	Country	Player	Rank^{1}	Seed
BRA	Marcelo Melo	BRA	Bruno Soares	14	1
CAN	Daniel Nestor	FRA	Édouard Roger-Vasselin	18	2
ROU	Florin Mergea	ROU	Horia Tecău	26	3
PHI	Treat Huey	BLR	Max Mirnyi	38	4

- ^{1} Rankings are as of July 11, 2016

=== Other entrants ===
The following pairs received wildcards into the doubles main draw:

- (United States) Taylor Fritz / (United States) Reilly Opelka
- (United States) Denis Kudla / (United States) Frances Tiafoe

The following pair received entry from the doubles qualifying draw:

- (United States) Brian Baker / (United States) Austin Krajicek

=== Retirements ===
- (Philippines) Treat Huey

== WTA singles main-draw entrants ==
=== Seeds ===
Country	Player	Rank ^{1}	Seed
AUS	Samantha Stosur	14	1
USA	Sloane Stephens	23	2
PUR	Monica Puig	33	3
FRA	Kristina Mladenovic	34	4
CAN	Eugenie Bouchard	40	5
KAZ	Yulia Putintseva	42	6
BEL	Yanina Wickmayer	46	7
ROU	Monica Niculescu	53	8

- ^{1} Rankings are as of July 11, 2016

=== Other entrants ===
The following players received wild cards into the main singles draw:

- (Canada) Françoise Abanda
- (United States) Usue Maitane Arconada
- (United States) Samantha Crawford
- (United States) Jessica Pegula

The following players received entry using a protected ranking into the main draw:

- ~~(United States) Vania King~~
- (Canada) Aleksandra Wozniak

The following players received entry from the qualifying draw:

- (United States) Lauren Albanese
- (Russia) Varvara Flink
- (Russia) Alla Kudryavtseva
- (China) Zhu Lin

The following player received entry as a lucky loser:

- (Japan) Hiroko Kuwata

=== Withdrawals ===
Before the tournament

- (United States) Louisa Chirico → replaced by (Austria) Tamira Paszek
- (Russia) Margarita Gasparyan → replaced by (Japan) Risa Ozaki
- (United States) Vania King (change of schedule) → replaced by (Japan) Hiroko Kuwata
- (Croatia) Mirjana Lučić-Baroni → replaced by (Canada) Aleksandra Wozniak
- (China) Wang Qiang → replaced by (Slovakia) Kristína Kučová
- (United Kingdom) Heather Watson → replaced by (United States) Lauren Davis

During the tournament

- (Austria) Tamira Paszek (Upper respiratory illness)

=== Retirements ===
- (Denmark) Caroline Wozniacki (Back injury)

== WTA doubles main-draw entrants ==
=== Seeds ===
Country	Player	Country	Player	Rank^{1}	Seed
CAN	Gabriela Dabrowski	CHN	Yang Zhaoxuan	114	1
GBR	Naomi Broady	JPN	Miyu Kato	146	2
USA	Nicole Melichar	CHN	Xu Shilin	226	3
RUS	Ksenia Lykina	GBR	Emily Webley-Smith	300	4

- ^{1} Rankings are as of July 11, 2016

=== Other entrants ===
The following pair received a wildcard into the doubles main draw:

- (United States) Malkia Menguene / (India) Nidhi Surapaneni

=== Withdrawals ===
Before the tournament

- (Canada) Françoise Abanda (Right finger injury)

=== Retirements ===
- (Slovakia) Kristína Kučová (Back injury)
