= 2016 Open de Nice Côte d'Azur – Doubles =

Doubles
- 2016 Open de Nice Côte d'Azur

Final
- Champions: (Colombia) Juan Sebastián Cabal (Colombia) Robert Farah
- Runners-up: (Croatia) Mate Pavić (New Zealand) Michael Venus
- Score: 4–6, 6–4, [10–8]

Events
Singles	Doubles
← 2015 ·	Open de Nice Côte d'Azur

Mate Pavić and Michael Venus were the defending champions, but lost to Juan Sebastián Cabal and Robert Farah in the final, 6–4, 4–6, [8–10].

== Seeds ==
1. (Colombia) Juan Sebastián Cabal / (Colombia) Robert Farah (champions)
2. (Croatia) Mate Pavić / (New Zealand) Michael Venus (final)
3. (United States) Eric Butorac / (United States) Scott Lipsky (semifinals)
4. (Australia) Chris Guccione / (Brazil) André Sá (first round)

== Draw ==
=== Key ===
- Q = Qualifier
- WC = Wild card
- LL = Lucky loser
- Alt = Alternate
- SE = Special exempt
- PR = Protected ranking
- ITF = ITF entry
- JE = Junior exempt
- w/o = Walkover
- r = Retired
- d = Defaulted
- SR = Special ranking

=== Draw ===
First round
1	(Colombia) JS Cabal (Colombia) R Farah	4	6	[10]
(France) P-H Mathieu (Czech Republic) J Veselý	6	3	[6]
Alt	(Dominican Republic) V Estrella Burgos (Spain) D Muñoz de la Nava	3	0
(United States) N Monroe (United States) D Young	6	6
3	(United States) E Butorac (United States) S Lipsky	3	6	[10]
WC	(Chinese Taipei) C-p Hsieh (Chinese Taipei) T-h Yang	6	3	[5]
(Belarus) S Betov (Ukraine) I Marchenko	6	6
WC	(France) M Bourgue (France) Q Halys	3	3
(United States) D Kudla (Chile) J Peralta	6	4	[10]
(Italy) M Cecchinato (Italy) A Seppi	2	6	[6]
(Sweden) J Brunström (Sweden) A Siljeström	6	5	[10]
4	(Australia) C Guccione (Brazil) A Sá	2	7	[3]
(Argentina) G Durán (Argentina) A Molteni	6	6
(Netherlands) R Haase (Pakistan) A-u-H Qureshi	3	4
(Spain) D Marrero (Spain) F Verdasco	7^{8}	6^{5}	[7]
2	(Croatia) M Pavić (New Zealand) M Venus	6^{6}	7^{7}	[10]

Quarterfinals
1	(Colombia) JS Cabal (Colombia) R Farah	7^{7}	6
(United States) N Monroe (United States) D Young	6^{4}	4
3	(United States) E Butorac (United States) S Lipsky	6	7^{7}
(Belarus) S Betov (Ukraine) I Marchenko	1	6^{3}
(United States) D Kudla (Chile) J Peralta
(Sweden) J Brunström (Sweden) A Siljeström	w/o
(Argentina) G Durán (Argentina) A Molteni	4	6^{4}
2	(Croatia) M Pavić (New Zealand) M Venus	6	7^{7}

Semifinals
1	(Colombia) JS Cabal (Colombia) R Farah	6	6
3	(United States) E Butorac (United States) S Lipsky	2	3
(Sweden) J Brunström (Sweden) A Siljeström	6^{6}	3
2	(Croatia) M Pavić (New Zealand) M Venus	7^{8}	6

Final
1	(Colombia) JS Cabal (Colombia) R Farah	4	6	[10]
2	(Croatia) M Pavić (New Zealand) M Venus	6	4	[8]
