= 2016 Nottingham Open – Women's doubles =

Women's doubles
- 2016 Nottingham Open

Final
- Champion: (Czech Republic) Andrea Hlaváčková (China) Peng Shuai
- Runner-up: (Canada) Gabriela Dabrowski (China) Yang Zhaoxuan
- Score: 7–5, 3–6, [10–7]

Events
Singles	men	women
Doubles	men	women
← 2015 ·	Nottingham Open	· 2017 →

Raquel Atawo and Abigail Spears were the defending champions but chose not to participate this year.
Andrea Hlaváčková and Peng Shuai won the title, defeating Gabriela Dabrowski and Yang Zhaoxuan in the final, 7–5, 3–6, [10–7].

== Seeds ==
1. (Chinese Taipei) Chan Hao-ching / (Chinese Taipei) Chan Yung-jan (quarterfinals)
2. (China) Xu Yifan / (China) Zheng Saisai (quarterfinals)
3. (China) Han Xinyun / (China) Wang Yafan (quarterfinals)
4. (Canada) Gabriela Dabrowski / (China) Yang Zhaoxuan (final)

== Draw ==
=== Key ===
- Q = Qualifier
- WC = Wild card
- LL = Lucky loser
- Alt = Alternate
- SE = Special exempt
- PR = Protected ranking
- ITF = ITF entry
- JE = Junior exempt
- w/o = Walkover
- r = Retired
- d = Defaulted
- SR = Special ranking

First round
1	(Chinese Taipei) H-c Chan (Chinese Taipei) Y-j Chan	4	6	[13]
(Romania) R Olaru (United States) A Tatishvili	6	3	[11]
(United States) N Melichar (Poland) A Rosolska	2	4
(Czech Republic) A Hlaváčková (China) S Peng	6	6
3	(China) X Han (China) Y Wang	7^{7}	6
(Ukraine) O Savchuk (China) K Zhang	6^{1}	1
WC	(United Kingdom) F Christie (United Kingdom) L Robson	7^{7}	4	[10]
(Czech Republic) Ka Plíšková (Czech Republic) Kr Plíšková	6^{2}	6	[12]
(United Kingdom) J Rae (United Kingdom) A Smith	3	6	[6]
(Russia) A Kudryavtseva (China) L Zhu	6	3	[10]
(Turkey) Ç Büyükakçay (Japan) K Nara	3	2
4	(Canada) G Dabrowski (China) Z Yang	6	6
(Japan) S Aoyama (Czech Republic) R Voráčová	6	2	[9]
(United Kingdom) N Broady (Latvia) A Sevastova	3	6	[11]
(United States) L Davis (United States) C McHale	3	6	[8]
2	(China) Y Xu (China) S Zheng	6	2	[10]

Quarterfinals
1	(Chinese Taipei) H-c Chan (Chinese Taipei) Y-j Chan	2	6^{3}
(Czech Republic) A Hlaváčková (China) S Peng	6	7^{7}
3	(China) X Han (China) Y Wang	4	3
(Czech Republic) Ka Plíšková (Czech Republic) Kr Plíšková	6	6
(Russia) A Kudryavtseva (China) L Zhu	2	2
4	(Canada) G Dabrowski (China) Z Yang	6	6
(United Kingdom) N Broady (Latvia) A Sevastova	2	7	[10]
2	(China) Y Xu (China) S Zheng	6	5	[6]

Semifinals
(Czech Republic) A Hlaváčková (China) S Peng	w/o
(Czech Republic) Ka Plíšková (Czech Republic) Kr Plíšková
4	(Canada) G Dabrowski (China) Z Yang	6	6
(United Kingdom) N Broady (Latvia) A Sevastova	4	2

Final
(Czech Republic) A Hlaváčková (China) S Peng	7	3	[10]
4	(Canada) G Dabrowski (China) Z Yang	5	6	[7]
