= 2016 Open de Nice Côte d'Azur – Singles =

Singles
- 2016 Open de Nice Côte d'Azur

Final
- Champion: (Austria) Dominic Thiem
- Runner-up: (Germany) Alexander Zverev
- Score: 6–4, 3–6, 6–0

Details
- Draw: 28
- Seeds: 8

Events
Singles	Doubles
- Open de Nice Côte d'Azur

Defending champion Dominic Thiem defeated Alexander Zverev in the final, 6–4, 3–6, 6–0 to win the singles title at the 2016 Open de Nice Côte d'Azur.

This tournament marked the first professional appearance of future world No. 1 Daniil Medvedev; he qualified for the main draw and lost to Guido Pella in the first round.

== Seeds ==
The top four seeds receive a bye into the second round.

1. (Austria) Dominic Thiem (champion)
2. (France) Gilles Simon (quarterfinals)
3. (South Africa) Kevin Anderson (quarterfinals)
4. (France) Benoît Paire (second round)
5. (Portugal) João Sousa (semifinals)
6. (Italy) Fabio Fognini (first round)
7. (Italy) Andreas Seppi (quarterfinals)
8. (Germany) Alexander Zverev (final)

== Draw ==
Key

- Q = Qualifier
- WC = Wild card
- LL = Lucky loser
- Alt = Alternate
- ITF = ITF entry
- PR = Protected ranking
- SR = Special ranking
- SE = Special exempt
- JE = Junior exempt
- JR = Junior Accelerator Programme entrant
- CO = College Accelerator Programme entrant
- NG = Next Gen Accelerator Program entrant
- w/o = Walkover
- r = Retired
- d = Defaulted

=== Finals ===
Semifinals
1	(Austria) Dominic Thiem	6	6
(France) Adrian Mannarino	1	3
5	(Portugal) João Sousa	4	6	2
8	(Germany) Alexander Zverev	6	4	6

Final
1	(Austria) Dominic Thiem	6	3	6
8	(Germany) Alexander Zverev	4	6	0

=== Top half ===
First round
(Czech Republic) J Veselý	6^{5}	6	3
(Argentina) L Mayer	7^{7}	3	6
(South Korea) H Chung	6^{3}	3
(France) P-H Mathieu	7^{7}	6
(Spain) D Muñoz de la Nava	7^{7}	5	4
7	(Italy) A Seppi	6^{4}	7	6
(Netherlands) R Haase	7^{7}	3	4
(France) A Mannarino	6^{4}	6	6
Q	(Russia) D Medvedev	1	7^{7}	6^{5}
(Argentina) G Pella	6	6^{4}	7^{7}
Q	(United States) D Young	4	6	6
6/WC	(Italy) F Fognini	6	3	3

Second round
1	(Austria) D Thiem	6	6
(Argentina) L Mayer	3	0
(France) P-H Mathieu	6	2	4
7	(Italy) A Seppi	4	6	6
4	(France) B Paire	3	0
(France) A Mannarino	6	6
(Argentina) G Pella	6	6
Q	(United States) D Young	3	0

Quarterfinals
1	(Austria) D Thiem	6	6
7	(Italy) A Seppi	3	3
(France) A Mannarino	5	7^{7}	6
(Argentina) G Pella	7	6^{4}	1

Semifinals
1	(Austria) D Thiem	6	6
(France) A Mannarino	1	3

=== Bottom half ===
First round
5	(Portugal) J Sousa	5	6	6
WC	(France) Q Halys	7	4	4
(Dominican Republic) V Estrella Burgos	6	6
(United States) D Kudla	3	2
Q	(Argentina) D Schwartzman	7^{7}	6
(Spain) F Verdasco	6^{5}	1
8	(Germany) A Zverev	5	7	0
Q	(United Kingdom) K Edmund	7	5	0^{r}
(Spain) M Granollers	6	6
PR	(United States) B Baker	3	1
(United States) T Fritz	7^{7}	6
(Ukraine) I Marchenko	6^{4}	4

Second round
5	(Portugal) J Sousa	3	6	6
(Dominican Republic) V Estrella Burgos	6	4	4
Q	(Argentina) D Schwartzman	6^{4}	3
3/WC	(South Africa) K Anderson	7^{7}	6
8	(Germany) A Zverev	7	6^{3}	6
(Spain) M Granollers	5	7^{7}	2
(United States) T Fritz	4	4
2	(France) G Simon	6	6

Quarterfinals
5	(Portugal) J Sousa	7	7
3/WC	(South Africa) K Anderson	5	5
8	(Germany) A Zverev	6	6^{6}	7^{7}
2	(France) G Simon	3	7^{8}	6^{1}

Semifinals
5	(Portugal) J Sousa	4	6	2
8	(Germany) A Zverev	6	4	6

== Qualifying ==
=== Seeds ===
1. (Argentina) Diego Schwartzman (qualified)
2. (Bosnia and Herzegovina) Damir Džumhur (first round)
3. (United States) Donald Young (qualified)
4. (United Kingdom) Kyle Edmund (qualified)
5. (Italy) Marco Cecchinato (qualifying competition)
6. (France) Mathias Bourgue (qualifying competition)
7. (Serbia) Miljan Zekić (first round)
8. (Russia) Daniil Medvedev (qualified)

=== Qualifiers ===
1. (Argentina) Diego Schwartzman
2. (Russia) Daniil Medvedev
3. (United States) Donald Young
4. (United Kingdom) Kyle Edmund

=== Qualifying draw ===
==== First qualifier ====
First round
1	(Argentina) Diego Schwartzman	6	6
(France) Maxime Teixeira	3	3
(Belarus) Dzmitry Zhyrmont	6	6
7	(Serbia) Miljan Zekić	4	4

Qualifying competition
1	(Argentina) Diego Schwartzman	6	6
(Belarus) Dzmitry Zhyrmont	2	1

==== Second qualifier ====
First round
2	(Bosnia and Herzegovina) Damir Džumhur	3	3
Alt	(China) Zhang Zhizhen	6	6
(Ecuador) Giovanni Lapentti	6	6^{4}	4
8	(Russia) Daniil Medvedev	3	7^{7}	6

Qualifying competition
Alt	(China) Zhang Zhizhen	6	2	6^{4}
8	(Russia) Daniil Medvedev	3	6	7^{7}

==== Third qualifier ====
First round
3	(United States) Donald Young	6	6
(Serbia) Miki Janković	4	2
(Australia) Gavin van Peperzeel	6^{6}	2
6/WC	(France) Mathias Bourgue	7^{8}	6

Qualifying competition
3	(United States) Donald Young	6	7
6/WC	(France) Mathias Bourgue	4	5

==== Fourth qualifier ====
First round
4	(United Kingdom) Kyle Edmund	6^{3}	6	6
WC	(France) Elliott Benchetrit	7^{7}	4	4
(Croatia) Ante Pavić	6^{4}	4
5	(Italy) Marco Cecchinato	7^{7}	6

Qualifying competition
4	(United Kingdom) Kyle Edmund	6	6
5	(Italy) Marco Cecchinato	3	4
