= 2016 Nottingham Open – Women's singles =

Women's singles
- 2016 Nottingham Open

Final
- Champion: (Czech Republic) Karolína Plíšková
- Runner-up: (United States) Alison Riske
- Score: 7–6^{(10–8)}, 7–5

Events
Singles	men	women
Doubles	men	women
← 2015 ·	Nottingham Open	· 2017 →

Ana Konjuh was the defending champion, but withdrew before the tournament began.

Karolína Plíšková won the title, defeating Alison Riske in the final, 7–6^{(10–8)}, 7–5.

== Seeds ==
1. (Czech Republic) Karolína Plíšková (champion)
2. (United Kingdom) Johanna Konta (second round)
3. (Denmark) Caroline Wozniacki (second round)
4. (Puerto Rico) Monica Puig (semifinals)
5. (Belgium) Yanina Wickmayer (first round)
6. (United Kingdom) Heather Watson (first round)
7. (Germany) Mona Barthel (first round)
8. (United States) Christina McHale (second round)

== Draw ==
=== Key ===
- Q = Qualifier
- WC = Wild card
- LL = Lucky loser
- Alt = Alternate
- ITF = ITF entry
- PR = Protected ranking
- SR = Special ranking
- SE = Special exempt
- JE = Junior exempt
- JR = Junior Accelerator Programme entrant
- CO = College Accelerator Programme entrant
- NG = Next Gen Accelerator Program entrant
- w/o = Walkover
- r = Retired
- d = Defaulted

=== Finals ===
Semifinals
1/WC	(Czech Republic) Karolína Plíšková	6	6
4	(Puerto Rico) Monica Puig	2	2
(United States) Alison Riske	6	7
(China) Zheng Saisai	1	5

Final
1/WC	(Czech Republic) Karolína Plíšková	7^{10}	7
(United States) Alison Riske	6^{8}	5

=== Top half ===
First round
1/WC	(Czech Republic) Ka Plíšková	6^{5}	6	6
(Latvia) A Sevastova	7^{7}	0	2
(United States) A Tatishvili	6	7^{7}
(Czech Republic) Kr Plíšková	4	6^{4}
Q	(Australia) A Barty	6	6
PR	(China) S Peng	3	2
LL	(Czech Republic) A Hlaváčková	7	7^{9}
5	(Belgium) Y Wickmayer	5	6^{7}
4	(Puerto Rico) M Puig	6	6
Q	(China) K Zhang	1	1
WC	(United Kingdom) L Robson	3	5
Q	(Portugal) M Larcher de Brito	6	7
LL	(Austria) T Paszek	6	6
(Japan) K Nara	4	2
(Slovakia) M Rybáriková	4	6	6
6	(United Kingdom) H Watson	6	0	4

Second round
1/WC	(Czech Republic) Ka Plíšková	6	6
(United States) A Tatishvili	1	3
Q	(Australia) A Barty	6	4	6
LL	(Czech Republic) A Hlaváčková	0	6	4
4	(Puerto Rico) M Puig	6	6
Q	(Portugal) M Larcher de Brito	4	0
LL	(Austria) T Paszek	6	3
(Slovakia) M Rybáriková	3	1^{r}

Quarterfinals
1/WC	(Czech Republic) Ka Plíšková	7^{7}	7^{9}
Q	(Australia) A Barty	6^{2}	6^{7}
4	(Puerto Rico) M Puig	6	6
LL	(Austria) T Paszek	4	3

Semifinals
1/WC	(Czech Republic) Ka Plíšková	6	6
4	(Puerto Rico) M Puig	2	2

=== Bottom half ===
First round
7	(Germany) M Barthel	2	1
(United States) A Riske	6	6
(Chinese Taipei) S-w Hsieh	6	6
(United Kingdom) N Broady	2	1
(Estonia) A Kontaveit	6	6
(United States) L Davis	3	1
(Turkey) Ç Büyükakçay	5	3
3	(Denmark) C Wozniacki	7	6
8	(United States) C McHale	6	6
(Poland) M Linette	1	4
Q	(United Kingdom) T Moore	6	7
(Croatia) D Vekić	2	5
WC	(United Kingdom) F Christie	4	2
(China) S Zheng	6	6
PR	(United States) V Duval	3	0
2	(United Kingdom) J Konta	6	6

Second round
(United States) A Riske	6	6
(Chinese Taipei) S-w Hsieh	2	4
(Estonia) A Kontaveit	6^{5}	6	7
3	(Denmark) C Wozniacki	7^{7}	3	5
8	(United States) C McHale	2	2
Q	(United Kingdom) T Moore	6	6
(China) S Zheng	6	7
2	(United Kingdom) J Konta	4	5

Quarterfinals
(United States) A Riske	6	6
(Estonia) A Kontaveit	3	3
Q	(United Kingdom) T Moore	2	4
(China) S Zheng	6	6

Semifinals
(United States) A Riske	6	7
(China) S Zheng	1	5

== Qualifying ==
=== Seeds ===
The top two seeds receive a bye into the second round.

1. (China) Zhang Kailin (qualified)
2. (Austria) Tamira Paszek (qualifying competition, lucky loser)
3. (China) Han Xinyun (first round)
4. (Thailand) Luksika Kumkhum (first round)
5. (China) Wang Yafan (first round)
6. (Russia) Alla Kudryavtseva (second round)
7. (Japan) Hiroko Kuwata (first round)
8. (United States) Grace Min (first round)

=== Qualifiers ===
1. (China) Zhang Kailin
2. (Australia) Ashleigh Barty
3. (Portugal) Michelle Larcher de Brito
4. (United Kingdom) Tara Moore

=== Lucky losers ===
1. (Austria) Tamira Paszek
2. (Czech Republic) Andrea Hlaváčková

=== Qualifying draw ===
==== First qualifier ====
First round
(United Kingdom) Lisa Whybourn	1	4
(China) Zhang Yuxuan	6	6
(United Kingdom) Katie Boulter	1	6	7^{7}
(Czech Republic) Renata Voráčová	6	3	6^{4}
(Ukraine) Olga Savchuk	5	6	6
7	(Japan) Hiroko Kuwata	7	3	1

Second round
1	(China) Zhang Kailin	7	3	6
(China) Zhang Yuxuan	5	6	1
(United Kingdom) Katie Boulter	7	7^{7}
(Ukraine) Olga Savchuk	5	6^{5}

Qualifying competition
1	(China) Zhang Kailin	6	6
(United Kingdom) Katie Boulter	0	1

==== Second qualifier ====
First round
(Canada) Gabriela Dabrowski	7^{7}	6
WC	(United Kingdom) Eden Silva	6^{1}	2
(Australia) Ashleigh Barty	6	6
(China) Xu Yifan	0	0
(Brazil) Paula Cristina Gonçalves	6	6
8	(United States) Grace Min	4	3

Second round
2	(Austria) Tamira Paszek	3	6	6
(Canada) Gabriela Dabrowski	6	1	3
(Australia) Ashleigh Barty	6	6
(Brazil) Paula Cristina Gonçalves	4	3

Qualifying competition
2	(Austria) Tamira Paszek	4	1
(Australia) Ashleigh Barty	6	6

==== Third qualifier ====
First round
3	(China) Han Xinyun	3	0
(Portugal) Michelle Larcher de Brito	6	6
(Poland) Alicja Rosolska	6^{2}	3
(Slovakia) Michaela Hončová	7^{7}	6
(United States) Sachia Vickery	6^{4}	1
(United States) Julia Boserup	7^{7}	6
(Czech Republic) Andrea Hlaváčková	6	7^{7}
5	(China) Wang Yafan	3	6^{5}

Second round
(Portugal) Michelle Larcher de Brito	6	6
(Slovakia) Michaela Hončová	1	3
(United States) Julia Boserup	4	2
(Czech Republic) Andrea Hlaváčková	6	6

Qualifying competition
(Portugal) Michelle Larcher de Brito	6	4	7^{7}
(Czech Republic) Andrea Hlaváčková	2	6	6^{2}

==== Fourth qualifier ====
First round
4	(Thailand) Luksika Kumkhum	6^{5}	3
(Japan) Shuko Aoyama	7^{7}	6
(Switzerland) Conny Perrin	4	5
(Australia) Naiktha Bains	6	7
(United Kingdom) Tara Moore	4	6	6
(China) Yang Zhaoxuan	6	2	1
(China) Zhu Lin	4	6	6^{1}
6	(Russia) Alla Kudryavtseva	6	1	7^{7}

Second round
(Japan) Shuko Aoyama	7^{7}	6
(Australia) Naiktha Bains	6^{2}	1
(United Kingdom) Tara Moore	4	6	6
6	(Russia) Alla Kudryavtseva	6	0	3

Qualifying competition
(Japan) Shuko Aoyama	2	2
(United Kingdom) Tara Moore	6	6
