= 2016 Citi Open – Women's doubles =

Women's doubles
- 2016 Citi Open

Final
- Champions: (Romania) Monica Niculescu (Belgium) Yanina Wickmayer
- Runners-up: (Japan) Shuko Aoyama (Japan) Risa Ozaki
- Score: 6–4, 6–3

Details
- Draw: 13
- Seeds: 4

Events
Singles	men	women
Doubles	men	women
- Citi Open

Belinda Bencic and Kristina Mladenovic were the defending doubles champions, but chose not to participate this year.

The unseeded team of Monica Niculescu and Yanina Wickmayer won the title, defeating Shuko Aoyama and Risa Ozaki in the final, 6–4, 6–3.

== Seeds ==
The top three seeds received a bye into the quarterfinals.

1. (Canada) Gabriela Dabrowski / (China) Yang Zhaoxuan (semifinals)
2. (United Kingdom) Naomi Broady / (Japan) Miyu Kato (quarterfinals)
3. (United States) Nicole Melichar / (China) Xu Shilin (semifinals)
4. (Russia) Ksenia Lykina / (United Kingdom) Emily Webley-Smith (first round)

== Draw ==
Key

- Q = Qualifier
- WC = Wild card
- LL = Lucky loser
- Alt = Alternate
- ITF = ITF entry
- PR = Protected ranking
- SR = Special ranking
- SE = Special exempt
- JE = Junior exempt
- JR = Junior Accelerator Programme entrant
- CO = College Accelerator Programme entrant
- NG = Next Gen Accelerator Program entrant
- w/o = Walkover
- r = Retired
- d = Defaulted

First round
(United States) M Brengle (United States) S Crawford	6	3	[10]
(United States) I Falconi (United States) D Lao	3	6	[3]
4	(Russia) K Lykina (United Kingdom) E Webley-Smith	1	7	[6]
(Romania) M Niculescu (Belgium) Y Wickmayer	6	5	[10]
WC	(United States) M Menguene (India) N Surapaneni	6	1	[2]
(United States) S Marand (United States) J Pegula	3	6	[10]
(Japan) H Kuwata (China) L Zhu	7^{7}	0
(Slovakia) K Kučová (Australia) J Wolfe	6^{5}	0^{r}
(Canada) F Abanda (Russia) V Flink
(Japan) S Aoyama (Japan) R Ozaki	w/o

Quarterfinals
1	(Canada) G Dabrowski (China) Z Yang	6	2	[10]
(United States) M Brengle (United States) S Crawford	3	6	[2]
(Romania) M Niculescu (Belgium) Y Wickmayer	6	3	[10]
(United States) S Marand (United States) J Pegula	2	6	[6]
(Japan) H Kuwata (China) L Zhu	2	7	[2]
3	(United States) N Melichar (China) S Xu	6	5	[10]
(Japan) S Aoyama (Japan) R Ozaki	6	6
2	(United Kingdom) N Broady (Japan) M Kato	2	3

Semifinals
1	(Canada) G Dabrowski (China) Z Yang	4	2
(Romania) M Niculescu (Belgium) Y Wickmayer	6	6
3	(United States) N Melichar (China) S Xu	4	7	[5]
(Japan) S Aoyama (Japan) R Ozaki	6	5	[10]

Final
(Romania) M Niculescu (Belgium) Y Wickmayer	6	6
(Japan) S Aoyama (Japan) R Ozaki	4	3
