= 2016 Citi Open – Men's doubles =

Men's doubles
- 2016 Citi Open

Final
- Champions: (Canada) Daniel Nestor (France) Édouard Roger-Vasselin
- Runners-up: (Poland) Łukasz Kubot (Austria) Alexander Peya
- Score: 7–6^{(7–3)}, 7–6^{(7–4)}

Details
- Draw: 16
- Seeds: 4

Events
Singles	men	women
Doubles	men	women
- Washington Open

Bob and Mike Bryan were the defending doubles champions, but chose not to participate this year.

The second-seeded team of Daniel Nestor and Édouard Roger-Vasselin won the title, defeating Łukasz Kubot and Alexander Peya in the final, 7–6^{(7–3)}, 7–6^{(7–4)}.

== Seeds ==
1. (Brazil) Marcelo Melo / (Brazil) Bruno Soares (first round)
2. (Canada) Daniel Nestor / (France) Édouard Roger-Vasselin (champions)
3. (Romania) Florin Mergea / (Romania) Horia Tecău (semifinals)
4. (Philippines) Treat Huey / (Belarus) Max Mirnyi (first round, retired)

== Draw ==
Key

- Q = Qualifier
- WC = Wild card
- LL = Lucky loser
- Alt = Alternate
- ITF = ITF entry
- PR = Protected ranking
- SR = Special ranking
- SE = Special exempt
- JE = Junior exempt
- JR = Junior Accelerator Programme entrant
- CO = College Accelerator Programme entrant
- NG = Next Gen Accelerator Program entrant
- w/o = Walkover
- r = Retired
- d = Defaulted

=== Draw ===
First round
1	(Brazil) M Melo (Brazil) B Soares	7	4	[7]
(United States) S Johnson (United States) J Sock	5	6	[10]
(Poland) Ł Kubot (Austria) A Peya	4	6	[10]
Q	(United States) B Baker (United States) A Krajicek	6	2	[8]
4	(Philippines) T Huey (Belarus) M Mirnyi	1	4^{r}
(Finland) H Kontinen (Australia) J Peers	6	3
(Australia) C Guccione (United States) S Querrey	6	6
(United States) E Butorac (United States) S Lipsky	2	4
(Austria) O Marach (France) F Martin	7	6
(Czech Republic) R Štěpánek (Serbia) N Zimonjić	5	3
WC	(United States) D Kudla (United States) F Tiafoe	3	3
3	(Romania) F Mergea (Romania) H Tecău	6	6
(Colombia) JS Cabal (Colombia) R Farah	2	6	[6]
(Sweden) R Lindstedt (Serbia) V Troicki	6	2	[10]
WC	(United States) T Fritz (United States) R Opelka	6	6^{4}	[8]
2	(Canada) D Nestor (France) É Roger-Vasselin	4	7^{7}	[10]

Quarterfinals
(United States) S Johnson (United States) J Sock	4	0
(Poland) Ł Kubot (Austria) A Peya	6	6
(Finland) H Kontinen (Australia) J Peers	6	7^{15}
(Australia) C Guccione (United States) S Querrey	2	6^{13}
(Austria) O Marach (France) F Martin	1	4
3	(Romania) F Mergea (Romania) H Tecău	6	6
(Sweden) R Lindstedt (Serbia) V Troicki	4	3
2	(Canada) D Nestor (France) É Roger-Vasselin	6	6

Semifinals
(Poland) Ł Kubot (Austria) A Peya	4	7^{7}	[10]
(Finland) H Kontinen (Australia) J Peers	6	6^{4}	[3]
3	(Romania) F Mergea (Romania) H Tecău	3	4
2	(Canada) D Nestor (France) É Roger-Vasselin	6	6

Final
(Poland) Ł Kubot (Austria) A Peya	6^{3}	6^{4}
2	(Canada) D Nestor (France) É Roger-Vasselin	7^{7}	7^{7}

== Qualifying ==
=== Seeds ===
1. (United Kingdom) Ken Skupski / (United Kingdom) Neal Skupski (first round)
2. (United States) Brian Baker / (United States) Austin Krajicek (qualified)

=== Qualifiers ===
1. (United States) Brian Baker / (United States) Austin Krajicek

=== Qualifying draw ===
First round
1	(United Kingdom) Ken Skupski (United Kingdom) Neal Skupski	3	6	[9]
(United States) Ryan Harrison (United States) Dennis Novikov	6	1	[11]
WC	(Dominican Republic) Víctor Estrella Burgos (United States) Mackenzie McDonald	4	1
2/PR	(United States) Brian Baker (United States) Austin Krajicek	6	6

Qualifying competition
(United States) Ryan Harrison (United States) Dennis Novikov	6	4	[8]
2/PR	(United States) Brian Baker (United States) Austin Krajicek	4	6	[10]
