= 2016 Nottingham Open – Men's singles =

Men's singles
- 2016 Nottingham Open

Final
- Champion: (United States) Steve Johnson
- Runner-up: (Uruguay) Pablo Cuevas
- Score: 7–6^{(7–5)}, 7–5

Details
- Draw: 48
- Seeds: 16

Events
Singles	men	women
Doubles	men	women
- Nottingham Open

Denis Istomin was the men's singles defending champion at the 2016 Nottingham Open, but lost in the first round to Damir Džumhur.

Steve Johnson won the title, defeating Pablo Cuevas in the final, 7–6^{(7–5)}, 7–5. It was his first ATP Tour singles title.

== Seeds ==
All seeds receive a bye into the second round.

1. (South Africa) Kevin Anderson (quarterfinals)
2. (Uruguay) Pablo Cuevas (final)
3. (Portugal) João Sousa (second round)
4. (Ukraine) Alexandr Dolgopolov (quarterfinals)
5. (United States) Sam Querrey (third round)
6. (United States) Steve Johnson (champion)
7. (Italy) Andreas Seppi (semifinals)
8. (Luxembourg) Gilles Müller (semifinals)

9. (Cyprus) Marcos Baghdatis (quarterfinals)
10. (Spain) Pablo Carreño Busta (second round)
11. (Canada) Vasek Pospisil (third round)
12. (Italy) Paolo Lorenzi (second round)
13. (Argentina) Guido Pella (second round)
14. (Spain) Fernando Verdasco (third round)
15. (Kazakhstan) Mikhail Kukushkin (second round)
16. (Lithuania) Ričardas Berankis (second round)

Click on the seed number of a player to go to their draw section.

== Draw ==
Key

- Q = Qualifier
- WC = Wild card
- LL = Lucky loser
- Alt = Alternate
- ITF = ITF entry
- PR = Protected ranking
- SR = Special ranking
- SE = Special exempt
- JE = Junior exempt
- JR = Junior Accelerator Programme entrant
- CO = College Accelerator Programme entrant
- NG = Next Gen Accelerator Program entrant
- w/o = Walkover
- r = Retired
- d = Defaulted

=== Finals ===
Quarterfinals
1	(South Africa) Kevin Anderson	6^{6}	7	4
6	(United States) Steve Johnson	7^{8}	5	6
(Israel) Dudi Sela	7	4	4
7	(Italy) Andreas Seppi	5	6	6
8	(Luxembourg) Gilles Müller	6	6
4	(Ukraine) Alexandr Dolgopolov	3	4
9	(Cyprus) Marcos Baghdatis	4	6	6^{8}
2	(Uruguay) Pablo Cuevas	6	4	7^{10}

Semifinals
6	(United States) Steve Johnson	6	6
7	(Italy) Andreas Seppi	4	4
8	(Luxembourg) Gilles Müller	6	6^{3}	4
2	(Uruguay) Pablo Cuevas	3	7^{7}	6

Final
6	(United States) Steve Johnson	7^{7}	7
2	(Uruguay) Pablo Cuevas	6^{5}	5

=== Top half ===
==== Section 1 ====
First round
PR	(France) J Benneteau	2	3
(Croatia) I Dodig	6	6
(Dominican Republic) V Estrella Burgos	7^{9}	6^{4}	6
(United States) R Ram	6^{7}	7^{7}	2
(Uzbekistan) D Istomin	6	6^{4}	4
(Bosnia and Herzegovina) D Džumhur	1	7^{7}	6
(Brazil) T Bellucci	6^{4}	6	2
(Australia) J Millman	7^{7}	2	6

Second round
1	(South Africa) K Anderson	6	6^{5}	6
(Croatia) I Dodig	3	7^{7}	3
(Dominican Republic) V Estrella Burgos	1	6	3
14	(Spain) F Verdasco	6	4	6
11	(Canada) V Pospisil	6	6
(Bosnia and Herzegovina) D Džumhur	1	4
(Australia) J Millman	2	2
6	(United States) S Johnson	6	6

Third round
1	(South Africa) K Anderson	6	7^{8}
14	(Spain) F Verdasco	3	6^{6}
11	(Canada) V Pospisil	6^{4}	6^{1}
6	(United States) S Johnson	7^{7}	7^{7}

Quarterfinals
1	(South Africa) K Anderson	6^{6}	7	4
6	(United States) S Johnson	7^{8}	5	6

==== Section 2 ====
First round
Q	(Czech Republic) J Hernych	6	3	2
(Israel) D Sela	4	6	6
(Australia) J Thompson	2	6	4
(Germany) B Becker	6	2	6
(France) A Mannarino	6	6
(United States) T Fritz	3	2
(Tunisia) M Jaziri	6	3	6
WC	(United Kingdom) J Ward	1	6	4

Second round
3	(Portugal) J Sousa	3	6^{3}
(Israel) D Sela	6	7^{7}
(Germany) B Becker	3	6	6
13	(Argentina) G Pella	6	1	3
12	(Italy) P Lorenzi	2	2
(France) A Mannarino	6	6
(Tunisia) M Jaziri	5	3
7	(Italy) A Seppi	7	6

Third round
(Israel) D Sela	6	2	6
(Germany) B Becker	3	6	4
(France) A Mannarino	2	3
7	(Italy) A Seppi	6	6

Quarterfinals
(Israel) D Sela	7	4	4
7	(Italy) A Seppi	5	6	6

=== Bottom half ===
==== Section 3 ====
First round
(Argentina) H Zeballos	4	3
(Czech Republic) J Veselý	6	6
(Russia) M Youzhny	4	6	6
(Russia) T Gabashvili	6	3	3
WC	(United Kingdom) A Ward	6^{3}	7^{7}	2
Q	(Canada) F Dancevic	7^{7}	6^{3}	6
(Czech Republic) L Rosol	4	3
(United Kingdom) K Edmund	6	6

Second round
8	(Luxembourg) G Müller	7^{7}	6
(Czech Republic) J Veselý	6^{2}	2
(Russia) M Youzhny	6	6
10	(Spain) P Carreño Busta	1	4
15	(Kazakhstan) M Kukushkin	6	6^{4}	6^{2}
Q	(Canada) F Dancevic	4	7^{7}	7^{7}
(United Kingdom) K Edmund	4	6^{5}
4	(Ukraine) A Dolgopolov	6	7^{7}

Third round
8	(Luxembourg) G Müller	6^{4}	7^{7}	6
(Russia) M Youzhny	7^{7}	6^{4}	3
Q	(Canada) F Dancevic	3	5
4	(Ukraine) A Dolgopolov	6	7

Quarterfinals
8	(Luxembourg) G Müller	6	6
4	(Ukraine) A Dolgopolov	3	4

==== Section 4 ====
First round
Q	(United States) E Escobedo	6	6
(Argentina) D Schwartzman	0	3
(United States) D Kudla	4	4
(Russia) E Donskoy	6	6
(United Kingdom) D Evans	3	6	7^{8}
WC	(United Kingdom) L Broady	6	2	6^{6}
WC	(United Kingdom) B Klein	5	4
Q	(France) S Robert	7	6

Second round
5	(United States) S Querrey	6	6
Q	(United States) E Escobedo	4	4
(Russia) E Donskoy	5	2
9	(Cyprus) M Baghdatis	7	6
16	(Lithuania) R Berankis	6	6^{3}	2
(United Kingdom) D Evans	2	7^{7}	6
Q	(France) S Robert	4	6^{3}
2	(Uruguay) P Cuevas	6	7^{7}

Third round
5	(United States) S Querrey	6	6^{8}	4
9	(Cyprus) M Baghdatis	1	7^{10}	6
(United Kingdom) D Evans	7^{7}	6^{5}	4
2	(Uruguay) P Cuevas	6^{4}	7^{7}	6

Quarterfinals
9	(Cyprus) M Baghdatis	4	6	6^{8}
2	(Uruguay) P Cuevas	6	4	7^{10}

== Qualifying ==
=== Seeds ===
1. (France) Stéphane Robert (qualified)
2. (Australia) Sam Groth (qualifying competition)
3. (El Salvador) Marcelo Arévalo (first round)
4. (India) Ramkumar Ramanathan (first round)
5. (Australia) Matthew Barton (qualifying competition)
6. (United States) Ernesto Escobedo (qualified)
7. (Canada) Frank Dancevic (qualified)
8. (Czech Republic) Michal Konečný (qualifying competition)

=== Qualifiers ===
1. (France) Stéphane Robert
2. (Canada) Frank Dancevic
3. (United States) Ernesto Escobedo
4. (Czech Republic) Jan Hernych

=== Qualifying draw ===
==== First qualifier ====
First round
1	(France) Stéphane Robert	6^{2}	7	6
WC	(United Kingdom) Ryan James Storrie	7^{7}	5	1
WC	(United Kingdom) Jay Clarke	4	5
5	(Australia) Matthew Barton	6	7

Qualifying competition
1	(France) Stéphane Robert	7	6
5	(Australia) Matthew Barton	5	3

==== Second qualifier ====
First round
2	(Australia) Sam Groth	6	7^{7}
(Germany) Frank Moser	1	6^{3}
(Croatia) Ante Pavić	4	7^{8}	3
7	(Canada) Frank Dancevic	6	6^{6}	6

Qualifying competition
2	(Australia) Sam Groth	6^{5}	3
7	(Canada) Frank Dancevic	7^{7}	6

==== Third qualifier ====
First round
3	(El Salvador) Marcelo Arévalo	0	4
(United Kingdom) Joshua Milton	6	6
(Australia) Bradley Mousley	2	6^{3}
6	(United States) Ernesto Escobedo	6	7^{7}

Qualifying competition
(United Kingdom) Joshua Milton	4	4
6	(United States) Ernesto Escobedo	6	6

==== Fourth qualifier ====
First round
4	(India) Ramkumar Ramanathan	3	1
(Czech Republic) Jan Hernych	6	6
Alt	(United Kingdom) Lloyd Glasspool	6^{2}	6^{5}
8	(Czech Republic) Michal Konečný	7^{7}	7^{7}

Qualifying competition
(Czech Republic) Jan Hernych	6	7^{7}
8	(Czech Republic) Michal Konečný	2	6^{2}
