= 2016 Nottingham Open – Men's doubles =

Men's doubles
- 2016 Nottingham Open

Final
- Champion: (United Kingdom) Dominic Inglot (Canada) Daniel Nestor
- Runner-up: (Croatia) Ivan Dodig (Brazil) Marcelo Melo
- Score: 7–5, 7–6^{(7–4)}

Events
| Singles | men | women |
| Doubles | men | women |
| ← 2015 · | Nottingham Open | · 2017 → |

Chris Guccione and André Sá were the defending champions, but chose not to participate this year.

Dominic Inglot and Daniel Nestor won the title defeating Ivan Dodig and Marcelo Melo in the final, 7–5, 7–6^{(7–4)}.

== Seeds ==
1. (Croatia) Ivan Dodig / (Brazil) Marcelo Melo (final)
2. (United Kingdom) Dominic Inglot / (Canada) Daniel Nestor (champions)
3. (Philippines) Treat Huey / (Belarus) Max Mirnyi (quarterfinals)
4. (Colombia) Juan Sebastián Cabal / (Colombia) Robert Farah (first round)

== Draw ==
=== Key ===
- Q = Qualifier
- WC = Wild card
- LL = Lucky loser
- Alt = Alternate
- SE = Special exempt
- PR = Protected ranking
- ITF = ITF entry
- JE = Junior exempt
- w/o = Walkover
- r = Retired
- d = Defaulted
- SR = Special ranking

=== Draw ===
First round
1 | (Croatia) I Dodig (Brazil) M Melo | 6 | 6
WC | (United Kingdom) J Marray (Canada) A Shamasdin | 3 | 2
(Sweden) R Lindstedt (Pakistan) A-u-H Qureshi | 6 | 7
(Austria) J Knowle (Poland) M Matkowski | 3 | 5
3 | (Philippines) T Huey (Belarus) M Mirnyi | 7 | 6
(Croatia) M Pavić (New Zealand) M Venus | 5 | 3
(Austria) O Marach (France) F Martin | 7^{7} | 7^{7}
(Spain) P Carreño Busta (Argentina) G Pella | 6^{5} | 6^{5}
(Mexico) S González (United States) S Lipsky | 7^{7} | 6
WC | (United Kingdom) K Skupski (United Kingdom) N Skupski | 6^{1} | 3
(Uruguay) P Cuevas (Portugal) J Sousa | 6 | 6
4 | (Colombia) JS Cabal (Colombia) R Farah | 4 | 4
(Italy) P Lorenzi (Italy) A Seppi | 6^{5} | 6^{1}
(United States) N Monroe (New Zealand) A Sitak | 7^{7} | 7^{7}
(Israel) J Erlich (United Kingdom) C Fleming | 6^{6} | 1
2 | (United Kingdom) D Inglot (Canada) D Nestor | 7^{8} | 6

Quarterfinals
1 | (Croatia) I Dodig (Brazil) M Melo | 6 | 6^{4} | [10]
(Sweden) R Lindstedt (Pakistan) A-u-H Qureshi | 3 | 7^{7} | [5]
3 | (Philippines) T Huey (Belarus) M Mirnyi | 4 | 7 | [5]
(Austria) O Marach (France) F Martin | 6 | 5 | [10]
(Mexico) S González (United States) S Lipsky | 6 | 6^{9} | [10]
(Uruguay) P Cuevas (Portugal) J Sousa | 3 | 7^{11} | [8]
(United States) N Monroe (New Zealand) A Sitak | 4 | 6^{6}
2 | (United Kingdom) D Inglot (Canada) D Nestor | 6 | 7^{8}

Semifinals
1 | (Croatia) I Dodig (Brazil) M Melo | 5 | 6 | [10]
(Austria) O Marach (France) F Martin | 7 | 3 | [6]
(Mexico) S González (United States) S Lipsky | 6^{4} | 4
2 | (United Kingdom) D Inglot (Canada) D Nestor | 7^{7} | 6

Final
1 | (Croatia) I Dodig (Brazil) M Melo | 5 | 6^{4}
2 | (United Kingdom) D Inglot (Canada) D Nestor | 7 | 7^{7}
