= 2016 Citi Open – Women's singles =

Women's singles
- 2016 Citi Open

Final
- Champion: (Belgium) Yanina Wickmayer
- Runner-up: (United States) Lauren Davis
- Score: 6–4, 6–2

Details
- Draw: 32
- Seeds: 8

Events
Singles	men	women
Doubles	men	women
- Citi Open

Sloane Stephens was the defending singles champion, but lost in the first round to Risa Ozaki.

Seventh-seeded Yanina Wickmayer won the title, defeating Lauren Davis in the final, 6–4, 6–2.

== Seeds ==
1. (Australia) Samantha Stosur (quarterfinals)
2. (United States) Sloane Stephens (first round)
3. (Puerto Rico) Monica Puig (second round)
4. (France) Kristina Mladenovic (quarterfinals)
5. (Canada) Eugenie Bouchard (first round)
6. (Kazakhstan) Yulia Putintseva (semifinals)
7. (Belgium) Yanina Wickmayer (champion)
8. (Romania) Monica Niculescu (first round)

== Draw ==
Key

- Q = Qualifier
- WC = Wild card
- LL = Lucky loser
- Alt = Alternate
- ITF = ITF entry
- PR = Protected ranking
- SR = Special ranking
- SE = Special exempt
- JE = Junior exempt
- JR = Junior Accelerator Programme entrant
- CO = College Accelerator Programme entrant
- NG = Next Gen Accelerator Program entrant
- w/o = Walkover
- r = Retired
- d = Defaulted

=== Finals ===
Semifinals
WC	(United States) Jessica Pegula	2	3
(United States) Lauren Davis	6	6
7	(Belgium) Yanina Wickmayer	6	6
6	(Kazakhstan) Yulia Putintseva	4	2

Final
(United States) Lauren Davis	4	2
7	(Belgium) Yanina Wickmayer	6	6

=== Top half ===
First round
1	(Australia) S Stosur	6	6
Q	(Russia) A Kudryavtseva	3	0
LL	(Japan) H Kuwata	1	1
(Denmark) C Wozniacki	6	6
PR	(Canada) A Wozniak	2	2
WC	(United States) J Pegula	6	6
(United States) C McHale	6	6
8	(Romania) M Niculescu	3	4
3	(Puerto Rico) M Puig	6	4	6
(France) O Dodin	2	6	3
(United States) L Davis	5	7	6
(United States) S Rogers	7	5	3
(Austria) T Paszek	6	6
Q	(United States) L Albanese	3	4
(Italy) C Giorgi	7	6
5	(Canada) E Bouchard	5	4

Second round
1	(Australia) S Stosur	5	4
(Denmark) C Wozniacki	7	3^{r}
WC	(United States) J Pegula	7	6
(United States) C McHale	5	2
3	(Puerto Rico) M Puig	4	2
(United States) L Davis	6	6
(Austria) T Paszek
(Italy) C Giorgi	w/o

Quarterfinals
1	(Australia) S Stosur	6^{4}	3
WC	(United States) J Pegula	7^{7}	6
(United States) L Davis	6	6
(Italy) C Giorgi	4	4

Semifinals
WC	(United States) J Pegula	2	3
(United States) L Davis	6	6

=== Bottom half ===
First round
7	(Belgium) Y Wickmayer	7	6
(United States) M Brengle	5	4
Q	(China) L Zhu	5	4
(China) S Zhang	7	6
(Slovakia) K Kučová	3	5
(Germany) S Lisicki	6	7
WC	(United States) S Crawford	2	6	3
4	(France) K Mladenovic	6	2	6
6	(Kazakhstan) Y Putintseva	7	7
Q	(Russia) V Flink	5	5
WC	(Canada) F Abanda	6^{3}	4
WC	(United States) UM Arconada	7^{7}	6
(United Kingdom) N Broady	6	6
(United States) I Falconi	3	4
(Japan) R Ozaki	6	6
2	(United States) S Stephens	2	1

Second round
7	(Belgium) Y Wickmayer	6	7
(China) S Zhang	3	5
(Germany) S Lisicki	3	3
4	(France) K Mladenovic	6	6
6	(Kazakhstan) Y Putintseva	6	4	6
WC	(United States) UM Arconada	4	6	4
(United Kingdom) N Broady	1	7	4
(Japan) R Ozaki	6	5	6

Quarterfinals
7	(Belgium) Y Wickmayer	4	6	6
4	(France) K Mladenovic	6	3	4
6	(Kazakhstan) Y Putintseva	6	6
(Japan) R Ozaki	4	2

Semifinals
7	(Belgium) Y Wickmayer	6	6
6	(Kazakhstan) Y Putintseva	4	2

== Qualifying ==
=== Seeds ===
1. (China) Zhu Lin (qualified)
2. (Japan) Hiroko Kuwata (qualifying competition, lucky loser)
3. (Russia) Alla Kudryavtseva (qualified)
4. (Japan) Miyu Kato (first round)
5. (Russia) Ksenia Lykina (first round)
6. (China) Xu Shilin (qualifying competition)
7. (China) Yang Zhaoxuan (first round)
8. (Japan) Shuko Aoyama (qualifying competition)

=== Qualifiers ===
1. (China) Zhu Lin
2. (Russia) Varvara Flink
3. (Russia) Alla Kudryavtseva
4. (United States) Lauren Albanese

=== Lucky losers ===
1. (Japan) Hiroko Kuwata

=== Draw ===
==== First qualifier ====
First round
1	(China) Zhu Lin	6	2	6
(United States) Jennifer Elie	2	6	1
(United States) Sanaz Marand	2	7^{7}	6
5	(Russia) Ksenia Lykina	6	6^{4}	3

Qualifying competition
1	(China) Zhu Lin	6	6
(United States) Sanaz Marand	2	3

==== Second qualifier ====
First round
2	(Japan) Hiroko Kuwata	4	7	6
(Australia) Jarmila Wolfe	6	5	0
WC	(Russia) Varvara Flink	7^{7}	6
7	(China) Yang Zhaoxuan	6^{0}	0

Qualifying competition
2	(Japan) Hiroko Kuwata	6	2	4
WC	(Russia) Varvara Flink	0	6	6

==== Third qualifier ====
First round
3	(Russia) Alla Kudryavtseva	7	3	6
(United States) Danielle Lao	5	6	3
(Russia) Victoria Kan	2	0^{r}
6	(China) Xu Shilin	6	5

Qualifying competition
3	(Russia) Alla Kudryavtseva	6	6
6	(China) Xu Shilin	3	4

==== Fourth qualifier ====
First round
4	(Japan) Miyu Kato	4	2
(United States) Lauren Albanese	6	6
WC	(United States) Raveena Kingsley	3	6	0
8	(Japan) Shuko Aoyama	6	2	6

Qualifying competition
(United States) Lauren Albanese	7	6
8	(Japan) Shuko Aoyama	5	1
