= Kevin Anderson (tennis) =

South African tennis player

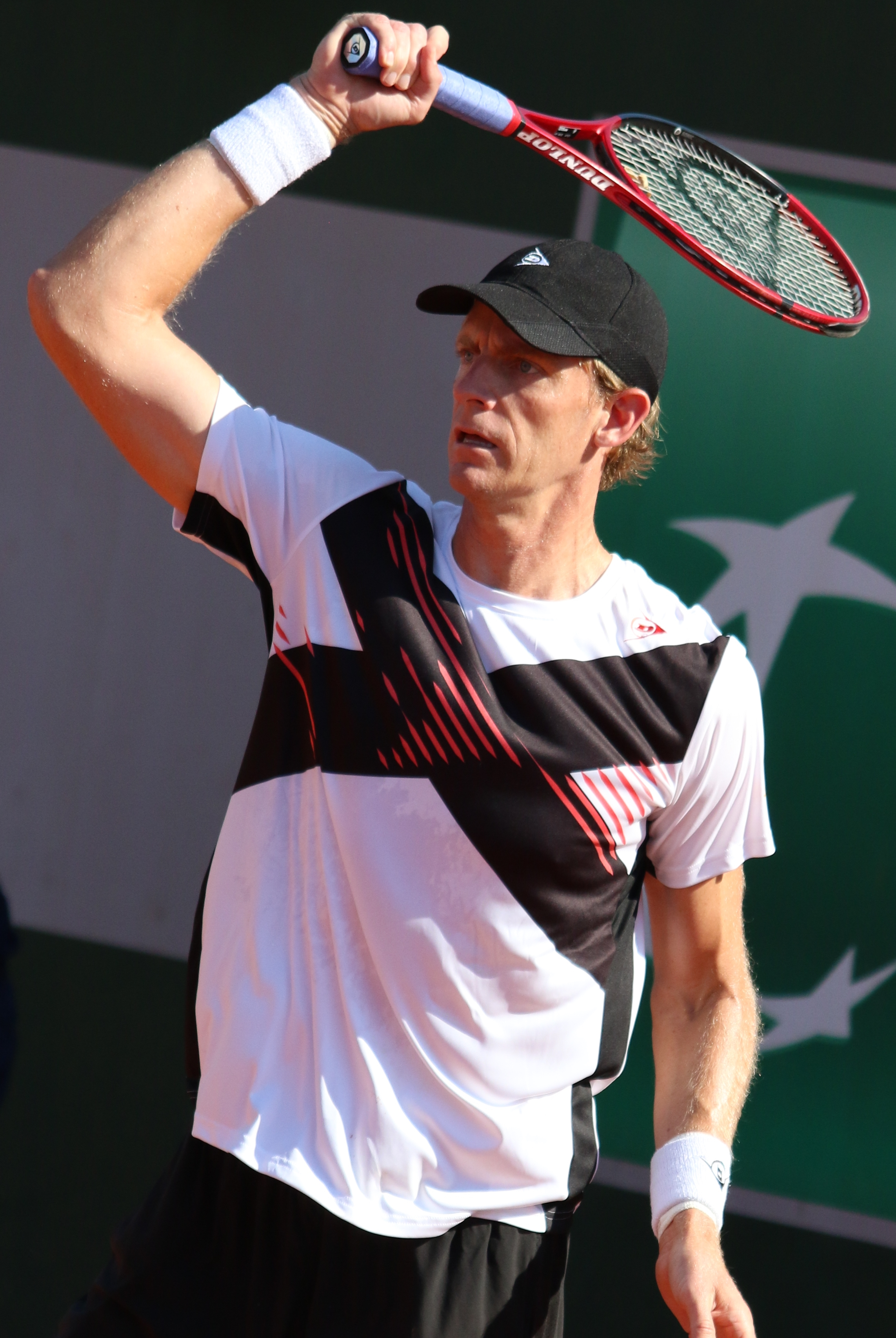
- Anderson at the 2021 French Open
- Country (sports): South Africa
- Residence: Gulf Stream, Florida, U.S. Johannesburg, South Africa
- Born: 18 May 1986 (age 40) Johannesburg, South Africa
- Height: 2.03 m (6 ft 8 in)
- Turned pro: 2007
- Retired: 2023-2024
- Plays: Right-handed (two-handed backhand)
- College: University of Illinois
- Coach: Diego Moyano; Jay Bosworth
- Prize money: US$17,791,917: 45th all-time leader in earnings

Singles
- Career record: 356–255 (58.3%)
- Career titles: 7
- Highest ranking: No. 5 (16 July 2018)

Grand Slam singles results
- Australian Open: 4R (2013, 2014, 2015)
- French Open: 4R (2013, 2014, 2017, 2018)
- Wimbledon: F (2018)
- US Open: F (2017)

Other tournaments
- Tour Finals: SF (2018)
- Olympic Games: 2R (2008)

Doubles
- Career record: 59–71 (45.4%)
- Career titles: 1
- Highest ranking: No. 58 (17 November 2014)

Grand Slam doubles results
- Australian Open: 3R (2013)
- Wimbledon: QF (2008)
- US Open: 2R (2010)

Other doubles tournaments
- Olympic Games: 1R (2008)

Mixed doubles
- Career record: 1–3

Grand Slam mixed doubles results
- Wimbledon: 1R (2012)

Team competitions
- Davis Cup: PO (2011)
- Hopman Cup: RR (2013)
- Last updated on: 21 July 2024.

Kevin Anderson

President of ATP Player Council
- In office October 13, 2020 – 2024
- Preceded by: Novak Djokovic
- Succeeded by: Matthew Ebden

Vice President of ATP Player Council
- In office August 30, 2016 – October 13, 2020
- President: Novak Djokovic
- Preceded by: Gilles Simon

Kevin Michael Anderson (born 18 May 1986) is a South African former professional tennis player. He achieved his career-high Association of Tennis Professionals (ATP) ranking of world No. 5 on 16 July 2018. He was the first South African to be ranked in the top 5 since Kevin Curren was No. 5 on 23 September 1985.

In February 2011, Anderson won his first ATP Tour title at the South African Open in his hometown of Johannesburg. Anderson reached his first major final at the 2017 US Open, where he lost to Rafael Nadal. In the 2018 Wimbledon semifinals, Anderson reached his second major final by defeating American John Isner in the second-longest match in the history of major tournaments, at 6 hours and 36 minutes (second only to the 2010 match between John Isner and Nicolas Mahut). He then lost to Novak Djokovic in the final. On 3 May 2022, Anderson retired at age 35, but he made a brief comeback in the summer of 2023.

== Early years ==
Anderson started playing tennis at age six and was competitive in 800-metre races at school. On the eve of their meeting in the finals at the 2017 US Open, it emerged that as a 12-year old, Anderson regularly competed against future world number one Rafael Nadal on the juniors circuit.

== Collegiate career ==
Anderson played three seasons of college tennis in the United States at the University of Illinois Urbana-Champaign. He was a three-time All-American in singles and two-time All-American in doubles. During his sophomore year (2005–06), he won the national doubles championships with playing partner Ryan Rowe.

In 2007, Anderson led Illinois to a runner-up team finish, losing to host Georgia on their home courts. In the championship dual match, Anderson lost at #1 singles to future ATP top-ten player, John Isner. During the singles tournament, Anderson lost in the semifinals to eventual two-time national champion, Somdev Devvarman of Virginia. In doubles, Anderson and partner, Ryan Rowe, fell short of repeating as champions, losing in the championship match to Marco Born and Andreas Siljeström of Middle Tennessee State in three sets, after having a couple match points.

== Professional career ==
=== 2003–2007: Early career ===
At age 17, Anderson entered his first professional tournament, winning four main-draw matches in the four-week tournament to earn a world ranking of No. 1178 from his only tournament of the year. He also finished the year with a doubles ranking of No. 902. In November, Anderson entered his third pro tournament and won the Botswana F1 to push his ranking to No. 769. He followed that up the next two weeks in South Africa, reaching the final in F1 and the semifinals in F2 to finish the year ranked No. 665 in singles from just 3 tournaments.

At age 19, Anderson continued to play at the Futures level, exclusively in the United States, reaching the semifinals of USA F21 in August. In November, he played his first Challenger event in Champaign, qualifying and beating No. 192 Jan-Michael Gambill in the first round. He finished the year ranked No. 766.

In 2005, Anderson played his first pro tournaments of the year in June, again in the United States, reaching the finals of USA F13 and F21. He returned to Champaign again in November, beating No. 107 Kevin Kim to reach his first Challenger quarterfinal. He finished the year ranked No. 517. In doubles, he won a pair of USA Futures back to back in June and finished the year ranked No. 530.

In 2006, Anderson again waited until June to play his first tournaments. He repeated as a finalist in USA F12, and then won USA F13 before qualifying two weeks later in the Winnetka Challenger and reaching the final to push his ranking to No. 310. He recorded his first win over a top-100 opponent in the qualifying for the ATP tournament in New Haven, beating No. 88 Chris Guccione, before losing in the main draw to No. 41 Arnaud Clément.

In September 2007 in the Challenger in New Orleans, he needed to qualify to make the main draw in both singles and doubles, and won all 13 matches that week to take the singles and doubles titles, beating four top-200 singles players and the top three seeded doubles teams. His Challenger success in New Orleans helped him to career-high rankings at the end of 2007 of No. 221 in singles and No. 398 in doubles.

=== 2008: First Grand Slam entry ===
Anderson began 2008 with a bit of success, reaching the quarters of the Challenger in New Caledonia before qualifying in his first Grand Slam attempt in Australia. He lost in the main draw first round to No. 84 Alejandro Falla in 5 sets, but his efforts got his ranking to a career high of No. 190.

At the 2008 Tennis Channel Open in Las Vegas, as a qualifier, he managed to defeat sixth seed Michaël Llodra in straight sets, 6–2, 7–6. In the second round he beat giant John Isner 7–6, 7–5. He beat Evgeny Korolev in his first ever ATP quarter-final 6–2, 6–0. In the semi-finals he won in straight sets against Robby Ginepri to reach his first ever ATP tour final. In the final, he fell to Sam Querrey in 3 sets.

In the second round of the Sony Ericsson Open in Key Biscayne, Florida, he beat Novak Djokovic for his first win against a top-10 player.

At Wimbledon, Anderson and partner Robert Lindstedt of Sweden reached the quarterfinals before losing to the eventual tournament champions, Daniel Nestor and Nenad Zimonjić.

Anderson also represented South Africa in the Beijing Olympics, defeating Komlavi Loglo before losing to Nicolas Kiefer 4–6, 7–6, 4–6 in the singles tournament and losing (with his partner Jeff Coetzee) to Nicolás Almagro and David Ferrer of Spain 6–3, 3–6, 4–6.

=== 2009: Victory at Sanremo Challenger ===
After a slow start to the year, he won the Sanremo Challenger in May, beating Blaž Kavčič in the final in three sets.

At the Aegon Championships (Queen's Club, London), Anderson won three matches to qualify, and then defeated no. 57 Fabio Fognini in the first round of the main draw, before losing to no. 46 Sam Querrey in the second round.

=== 2010: US Open and Canadian Masters third round ===
At Wimbledon, he was defeated by seventh seed Nikolay Davydenko after winning the first two sets.

Anderson advanced to the semifinals of the 2010 Atlanta Tennis Championships in July, upsetting fifth seed Janko Tipsarević in the first round.

He qualified and reached the third round of the Rogers Cup in Toronto, beating Leonardo Mayer and Sam Querrey before losing to no. 1 Rafael Nadal.

He then won his first Grand Slam match at the US Open over Somdev Devvarman in straight sets and backed it up with a five-set win over 26th seed Thomaz Bellucci.

=== 2011: First Career ATP title ===
He began the 2011 season by advancing to the semifinals of the Brisbane International Tournament, before losing to Andy Roddick in three sets. He then went on to lose in the first round of the Australian Open to Blaž Kavčič.

At the SA Open, (Anderson's home event), he claimed his maiden ATP Tour title, by beating Indian Somdev Devvarman, rising 19 positions in the ATP rankings to a career high of No. 40.

He reached a career-high of world no. 33 after making the quarterfinals of the 2011 Sony Ericsson Open. At the Atlanta Tennis Championships, Anderson reached the quarterfinals as the second seed, defeating Michael Russell, before losing in straight sets to Gilles Müller. Next at the Legg Mason Tennis Classic, Anderson defeated Chris Guccione in the second round, before being defeated by Victor Troicki in the third round.

At the 2011 Rogers Cup, he defeated Pablo Andújar in straight sets before beating an out-of-sorts Andy Murray in the second round with an easy victory. He was defeated in the third round by Stanislas Wawrinka in a tight three set contest.

=== 2012: Second ATP title ===
Anderson opened 2012 with a third-round loss at the 2012 Australian Open. He followed it up with a win in Delray Beach, defeating qualifier Marinko Matosevic in the final.

At the French Open, he reached a career-best third round, where he was defeated by seventh seed Tomáš Berdych in five sets.

=== 2013: Grand Slam fourth round ===
Anderson started the year at the Sydney International, where he reached the final, but lost to Australian Bernard Tomic in three sets.

At the 2013 Australian Open, he defeated Fernando Verdasco in the third round, but lost to Tomáš Berdych in the fourth round. This was his career best in any Grand Slam event.

He played at Indian Wells, where he knocked out fourth seed David Ferrer. He reached the quarterfinals there before losing to Tomáš Berdych. He reached the fourth round of the French Open, before falling to Ferrer in straight sets. At Wimbledon, he lost in the third round to Berdych. He reached the final in Atlanta in July, but lost his third final of the year in three tiebreaks to John Isner.

=== 2014: Four wins against top-5 opponents ===
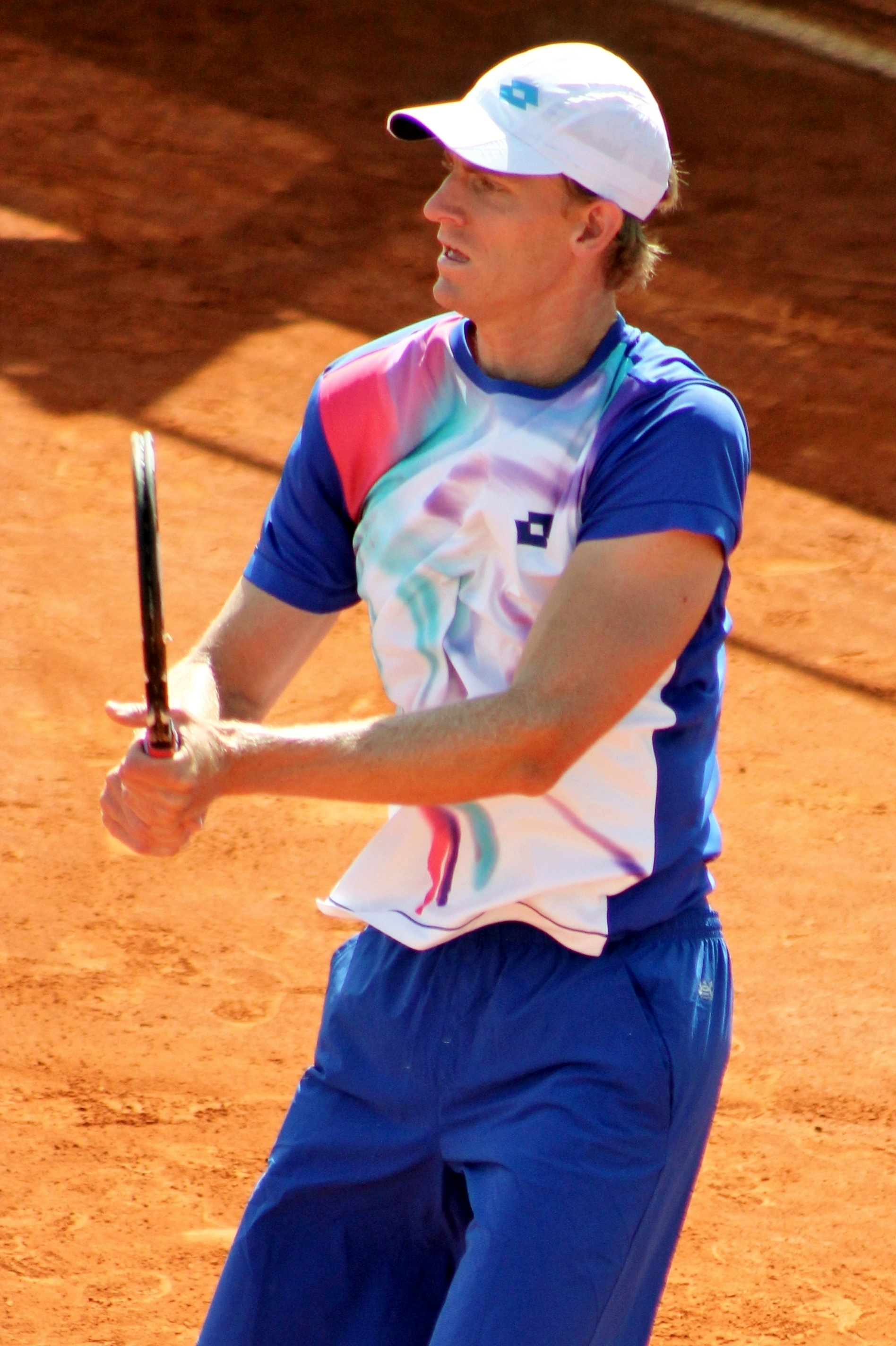
Anderson at the 2014 Madrid Open

Anderson started the year by reaching the fourth round of the Australian Open, before being knocked out in straight sets by Tomáš Berdych. He then reached the final at Delray Beach, before losing to Marin Čilić in two tiebreaks. At the Mexican Open held in Acapulco, he again reached the final, losing to Grigor Dimitrov in three sets, with tiebreaks in the first and third sets.

In the Indian Wells Masters, Anderson reached the quarterfinals, after beating third seed Stan Wawrinka in three sets. He lost to Roger Federer in straight sets. At the 2014 Madrid Open, he beat Radek Štěpánek, before losing to Tomáš Berdych. He repeated his success of 2013 by again reaching the fourth round in the French Open, before losing to fifth seed David Ferrer in four sets.

He then reached the quarterfinals of the Aegon Championships held at the Queen's Club, London, before losing to Radek Štěpánek. At the Wimbledon Championships he defeated Fabio Fognini to reach the fourth round, where he lost to Andy Murray.

Anderson made it to the quarterfinals of the Masters 1000 event in Toronto after defeating Fognini and Stanislas Wawrinka. At the Cincinnati Masters, he had a disappointing first-round, straight-set exit at the hands of John Isner.

He made it to the third round of the US Open, where he lost to eventual champion Marin Čilić. At the Paris Masters he again defeated Wawrinka to reach the quarterfinals, after which Tomáš Berdych beat him. The South African ended the year no. 16 in the ATP year-end rankings.

=== 2015: Top-10 debut ===
Anderson made the final in Memphis, losing to Kei Nishikori, but he made early exits in Estoril and Madrid. He then at Queen's Club made the final before being defeated by Andy Murray in straight sets. He again reached the fourth round at Wimbledon, where he led eventual champion Novak Djokovic two sets to love, taking both sets through tiebreakers. However, he was unable to sustain his form for the next three sets and eventually lost the match in five sets. Anderson became the champion of the ATP 250 in Winston-Salem, earning his third career singles title.

At the US Open, Anderson defeated Andy Murray, advancing to his first quarterfinals in a Grand Slam after seven attempts. Anderson won the first two sets, then lost the third set via tiebreaker, but after a fourth set, Anderson pulled away, winning the tiebreaker 7–0 and captured the victory. He would next face Stan Wawrinka, whom he had beaten the last four times they played, including once that year. This was their eighth match overall, but the first at Grand Slam level. Wawrinka levelled the head-to-head at 4–4, beating Anderson in straight sets, including a bagel in the third.

Following the US Open, Anderson traveled to Asia for the Japan Open, where he lost in the round of 32 to Gilles Müller. Despite this loss, he reached a career-high ranking of No. 10 on 12 October, the first South African tennis player in the top 10 in 18 years. He then traveled to Shanghai for the Shanghai Masters (tennis), where he was defeated in the quarterfinals by Jo-Wilfried Tsonga. This was followed by the Vienna Open, where he lost to Steve Johnson in the quarterfinals. Traveling to Basel next, he was defeated by yet another American in Donald Young in the Round of 16. He reached the third round in the 2015 BNP Paribas Masters, but failed to capitalise on a match point against Rafael Nadal.

=== 2016: Injury struggles ===
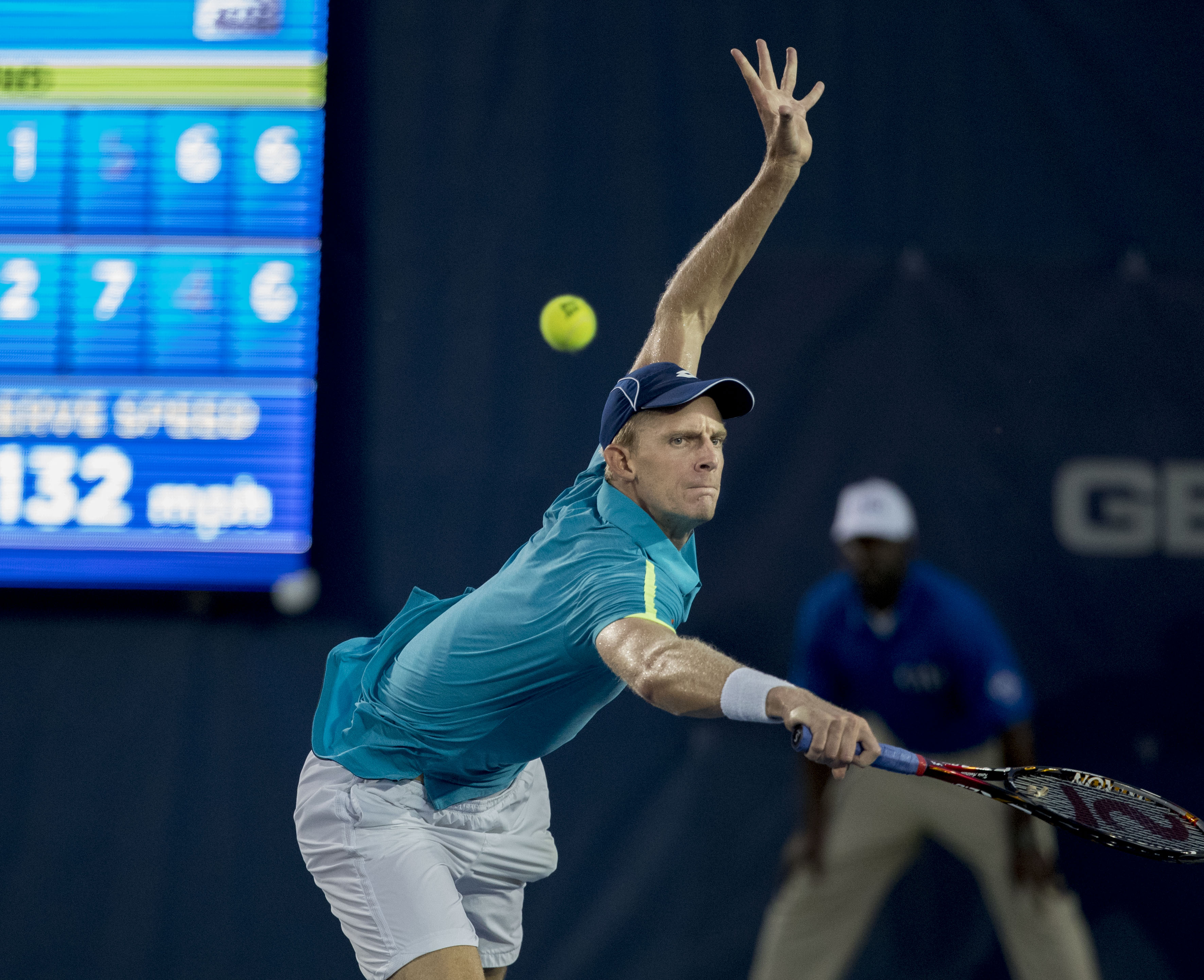
Anderson at the 2016 Washington Open

Anderson started his season at Auckland as the fourth seed. He defeated Robin Haase in the second round, but lost to Jack Sock in the quarterfinals, despite winning the first set. Anderson was then scheduled to play at the Chennai Open, but withdrew due to a left knee injury. Anderson exited the Australian Open early in the first round and was advised to take some time off to sort out problems with his shoulder. He took the break and also had minor surgery on his ankle while he was out. Anderson then returned to Delray Beach as the top seed. He lost the first set of his match against Austin Krajicek in the first round and then retired before the second set.

Anderson did not play again on tour until May at the Madrid Open. He lost in the first round against 13th seed Gaël Monfils. Anderson then played in Rome as the 16th seed. Anderson won his first-round match against Feliciano López, but lost in the second round to Juan Mónaco, despite winning the first set. Anderson then competed in Nice as the third seed. He defeated qualifier Diego Schwartzman, before losing to fifth seed João Sousa. Anderson then played at the French Open as the 18th seed, where he lost in the first round to Stéphane Robert. Anderson started his grass season at Queen's Club. Since he entered late, he had to go through qualifying. Anderson defeated Edward Corrie and Jiří Veselý, both in straight sets, to enter the main draw. He then lost to Bernard Tomic in the first round of the main draw. Anderson then played at Nottingham as the top seed. He defeated Ivan Dodig and 14th seed Fernando Verdasco to reach the quarterfinals, where he lost to sixth seed and eventual champion Steve Johnson. Anderson then played at Wimbledon as the 20th seed. He lost in the first round to Denis Istomin, despite winning the first two sets.

Anderson played at the Citi Open as the ninth seed. He lost in the second round to Malek Jaziri, despite winning the first set. Anderson then played in the Rogers Cup. He won his first-round match against Viktor Troicki. He then defeated sixth seed Dominic Thiem because Thiem had to retire. He then reached the quarterfinals after he defeated 12th seed Bernard Tomic for the first time. Anderson, however, lost to Stan Wawrinka in straight sets. The US Open saw his best performance in a Grand Slam for the year, defeating both Yoshihito Nishioka and Vasek Pospisil in straight sets, before bowing out to Jo-Wilfried Tsonga in the third round, also in straight sets.

=== 2017: US Open final ===
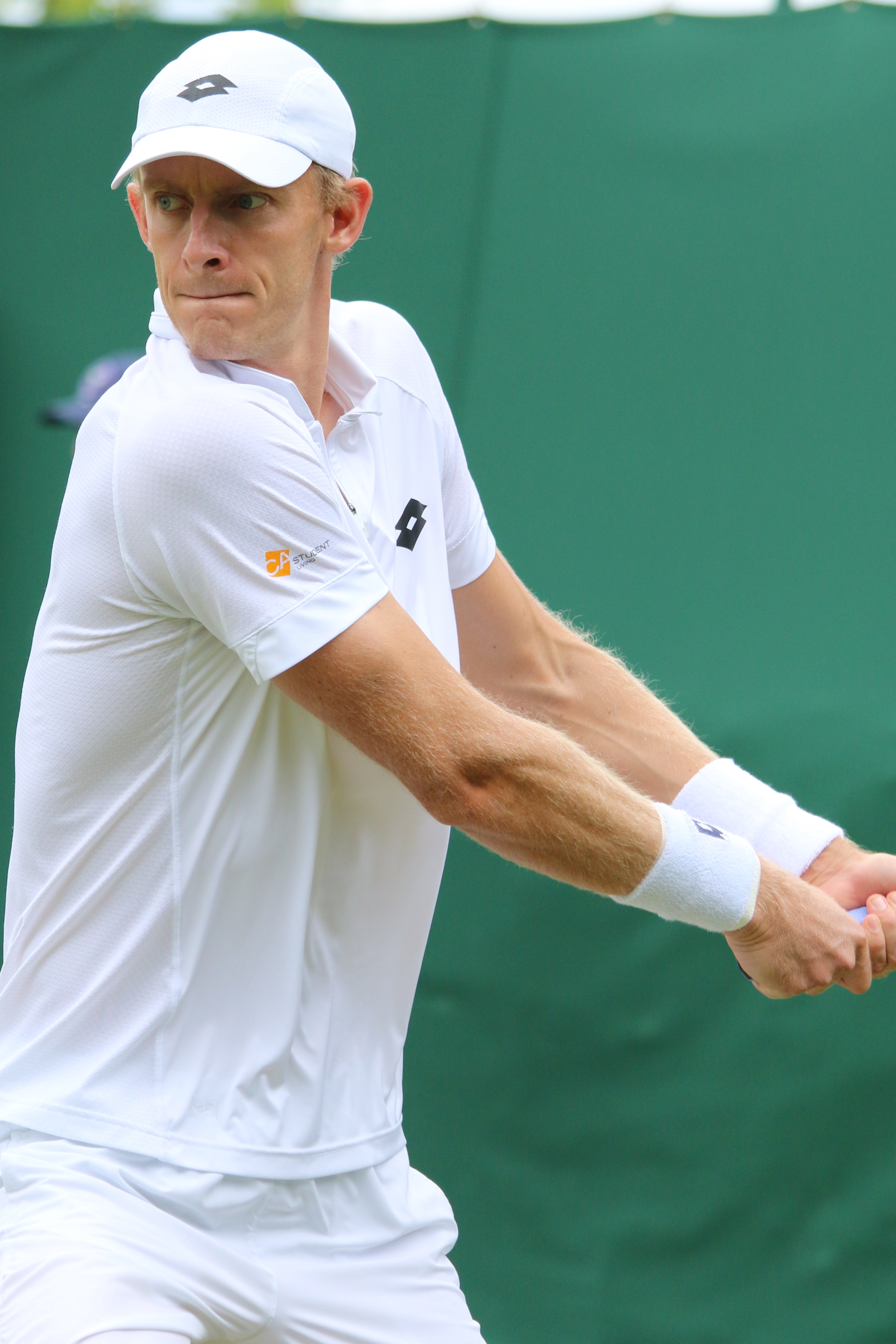
Anderson at the 2017 Wimbledon Championships

2017 was a better year for Anderson, despite a slow start. He began the year at the Memphis Open in February, where he lost in the first round to Bosnian Damir Džumhur. He also lost in the first round of the Delray Beach Open to resurgent Juan Martín del Potro.

In March, he made it to the second round of Indian Wells, where he lost to Steve Johnson. In Miami, he again made it to the second round, where he was defeated by Kei Nishikori.

In Houston, he played doubles with Sam Querrey, making it to the semifinals before losing to Dustin Brown and Frances Tiafoe. He then traveled to Barcelona, where he got past Carlos Berlocq and David Ferrer, losing in the third round to eventual champion Rafael Nadal.

In May, he defeated Richard Gasquet in the quarterfinals of Estoril, before succumbing to an in-form Gilles Müller in the semifinals. He had to go through qualifying in Rome, only to lose in the first round to eventual champion Alexander Zverev. He then traveled to Geneva, where he made it to the quarterfinals, falling again to Kei Nishikori in three tight sets. At the French Open, he had to retire from his fourth-round match against Marin Čilić.

Anderson was back in action on the grass-court swing, making it to the second round of Eastbourne, where he lost to Richard Gasquet. At Wimbledon, he made it to the fourth round before falling to Sam Querrey in five sets.

He had his best result at the Citi Open in Washington, where he defeated Dominic Thiem in the second round and Jack Sock in the semifinals to earn a runner-up finish against Alexander Zverev. Anderson also made the quarterfinals in Montréal, again falling to Zverev. After losing in the first round in Cincinnati, he withdrew from Winston-Salem.

Anderson reached the finals at the 2017 US Open, defeating Sam Querrey in four sets in the quarter-finals, and Pablo Carreño Busta in the semi-finals. In his first ever Slam final, he lost to Rafael Nadal in three sets.

=== 2018: Two ATP titles, Wimbledon final, World No. 5 ===
Anderson began his year at the 2018 Maharashtra Open in Pune, India. He reached the final, but fell 6–7^{(7–4)}, 2–6 to Gilles Simon.

His next endeavor was at the 2018 Australian Open, where he lost his first match in five sets to eventual semifinalist Kyle Edmund, despite being two sets up to one.

The inaugural New York Open, his third tournament of the year, yielded his first tournament win of 2018. All of his matches went to three sets; his path to the final included beating American rising star Frances Tiafoe and 2014 US Open finalist Kei Nishikori. He defeated American Sam Querrey in three sets. The win propelled him back into the top 10 since 2015 to be World No. 9, a new high.

This was followed up by his participation in the Mexican Open at Acapulco, where he beat Hyeon Chung in the quarterfinals. He reached the final but lost 4–6, 4–6 to Juan Martín del Potro. He reached the quarter-finals at the first two Masters 1000 events of the year, Miami and Indian Wells, losing to Borna Ćorić and Pablo Carreño Busta respectively, both times in a third set tiebreak.

At the French Open, Anderson lost to the 5'7" Diego Schwartzman in the fourth round. Schwartzman broke Anderson's serve nine times, the most times Anderson had ever been broken in one match.

At Wimbledon, Anderson was seeded eighth. He defeated Norbert Gombos, Andreas Seppi, 25th seed Philipp Kohlschreiber, and Gaël Monfils to reach his first quarterfinal at the tournament, where he faced eight-time champion, defending champion, and top seed Roger Federer. Federer dominated the match early, quickly claiming the first two sets and holding match points in the third. However, Anderson came back to upset Federer in what became a four-hour, five-set epic, winning 13–11 in the fifth set.

He then faced John Isner in the semifinals, in what became the second longest match in Grand Slam history and the third longest men's singles match ever, lasting 6 hours and 36 minutes, ending 7–6, 6–7, 6–7, 6–4, 26–24. This was also the longest semifinal match in Grand Slam history. By reaching the final, Anderson became the first South African player to reach the Wimbledon men's singles final since Kevin Curren in 1985. He then lost to Novak Djokovic in the final in straight sets, despite having five set point chances in the third. However, with this run to the final, he rose to a new career high of World No. 5.

Anderson saw a strong start to the hard court season at the Rogers Cup, defeating fifth seed Grigor Dimitrov in the quarterfinals before losing in three close sets to Stefanos Tsitsipas in the semifinals. At the US Open, he was seeded fifth, defeating Ryan Harrison, Jérémy Chardy, and 28th seed Denis Shapovalov, being defeated by ninth seed Dominic Thiem in straight sets in the fourth round.

=== 2019: Sixth ATP title ===
Anderson began his season at the Maharashtra Open in Pune. He defeated Laslo Djere, seventh seed Jaume Munar, third seed Gilles Simon, and Ivo Karlović to win the title.

At the Australian Open, Anderson was seeded fifth. He defeated Adrian Mannarino in four sets before being upset by Frances Tiafoe in the second round.

Anderson was seeded fifth at Indian Wells but withdrew due to a right elbow injury. He was then seeded sixth at the Miami Open and progressed into the quarterfinals, where he was defeated in straight sets by in-form and eventual champion Roger Federer.

Anderson was awarded the Arthur Ashe Humanitarian Award at the end of 2019.

=== 2020: Right knee surgery ===
At the 2020 Australian Open, Anderson lost to Taylor Fritz in five-sets. In February, he underwent surgery on his right knee for a torn meniscus.

He reached the semifinals in Vienna, but retired in the second set of his semifinal against Andrey Rublev.

=== 2021: Seventh ATP title and 350th ATP tour win ===
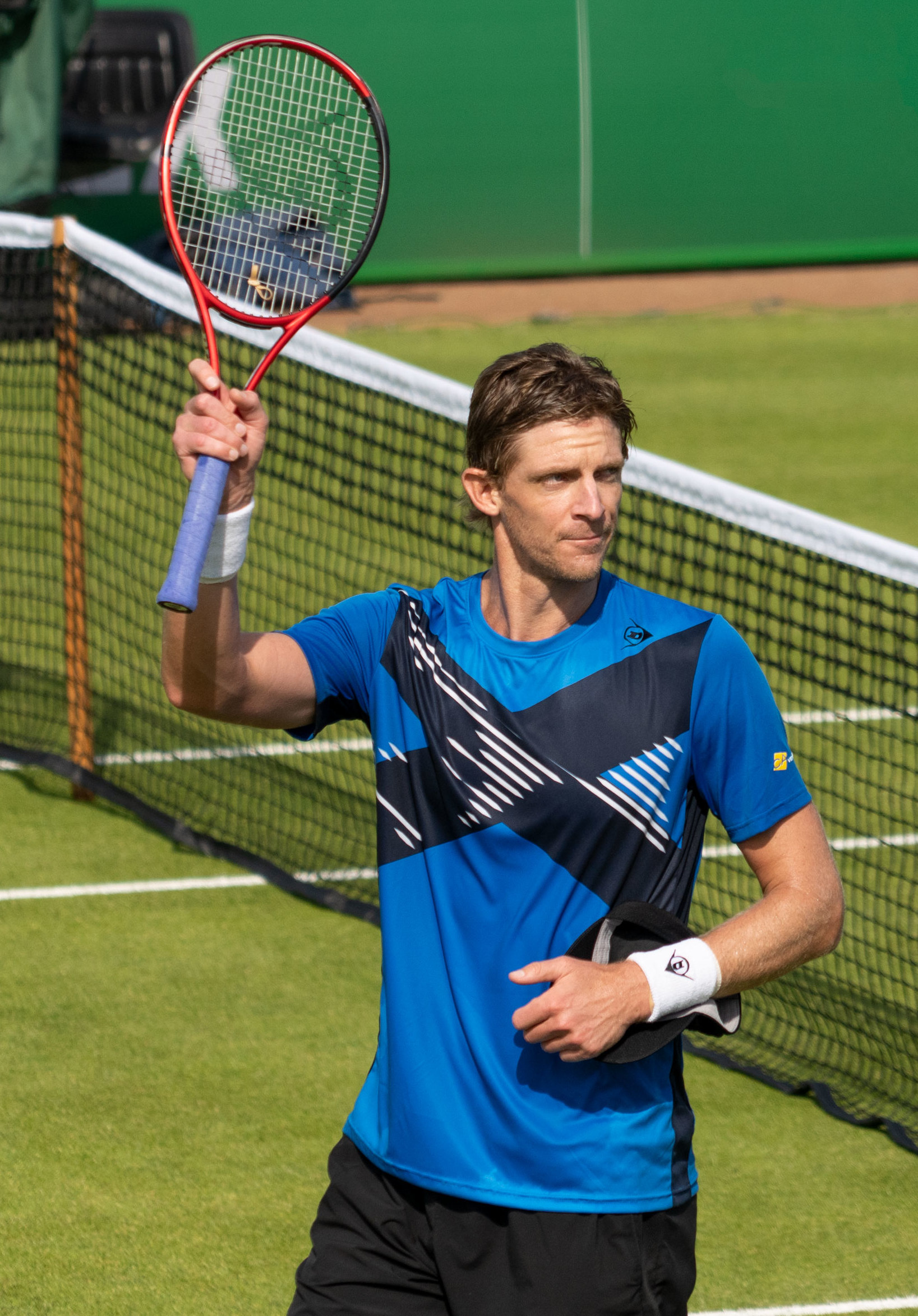
Anderson at the 2021 Nottingham Open

Anderson started his 2021 season during the week of February 1 at the Great Ocean Road Open. He beat 16th seed, Feliciano López, in the first round. He reached the third round where he lost to second seed and world No. 20, Karen Khachanov. At the Australian Open, he was defeated in the first round by ninth seed and world No. 10, Matteo Berrettini, despite having eight set points in the first set.

During the week of March 22, Anderson competed at the Miami Open. He lost in the first round to lucky loser Damir Džumhur.

The week of April 26 saw Anderson play at the Estoril Open. He reached the quarterfinals where he had to retire against sixth seed, Marin Čilić, due to a left adductor injury. At the French Open, he lost in the first round to Kwon Soon-woo in four sets.

Anderson rebounded from his knee surgery and won his 7th ATP title at the Hall of Fame Tennis Championships by defeating Jenson Brooksby 7–6, 6–4. The championship victory marked his 350th win on the ATP tour.

=== 2022: Retirement ===
Anderson started his 2022 season at the Melbourne Summer Set 1. He lost in the first round to Jaume Munar. At the Australian Open, he was defeated in the first round by 23rd seed and world No. 29, Reilly Opelka.

Competing at the first edition of the Dallas Open, Anderson lost in the second round to third seed and world No. 26, John Isner. In Delray Beach, he was beaten in the first round by Steve Johnson. At the Abierto Mexicano Telcel in Acapulco, he fell in the final round of qualifying to American J. J. Wolf. In March, he played at the BNP Paribas Open. Here, he lost in the first round of qualifying to Christopher O'Connell. At the Miami Open, he was defeated in the final round of qualifying to American Mitchell Krueger. However, due to Matteo Berrettini withdrawing from the tournament because of a right hand injury, he entered the main draw as a lucky loser. He lost in the second round to Juan Manuel Cerúndolo in three sets.

Anderson announced his retirement from professional tennis on 3 May 2022. He ended his singles career ranked No. 107.

=== 2023: Comeback ===
Anderson announced he was coming out of retirement, and in July he was awarded a wildcard for the 2023 Hall of Fame Open in Newport, Rhode Island. He reached the quarterfinals, where he lost to third seed Ugo Humbert 2–6, 4–6. Next, he played in the 2023 Citi Open, and lost in the first round to Australian Jordan Thompson. In the qualifiers of the 2023 US Open, he lost to Tomáš Macháč in the second round, bringing his comeback to a close.

== Playing style ==
Kevin Anderson's playing style is a blend of power, aggression, and tactical play, making him a formidable opponent on any surface, particularly on fast courts where his serve and groundstrokes can be most effective. Anderson's serve is one of his most significant weapons. Standing at 6 ft 8 in (203 cm), he uses his height to generate a high bounce and a lot of pace on his serve, often exceeding 130 mph (210 km/h). His serve placement and variety make it difficult for opponents to anticipate and return effectively. He has a formidable forehand and backhand, both of which are hit flat and with significant power. He is capable of hitting winners from both wings, particularly favoring his forehand to dictate play from the baseline. Anderson prefers to play aggressively, taking control of rallies early and looking to finish points quickly. He often steps inside the baseline to take the ball on the rise and put pressure on his opponents. Despite being primarily a baseline player, Anderson is proficient at the net. His height gives him a good reach, and he uses his volleys effectively to finish points when he gets the opportunity to move forward. While not as strong as his serve, Anderson's return game is solid. He uses his reach and anticipation to neutralize big servers and get into rallies where he can utilize his groundstrokes.

== Personal life ==
Anderson married his college girlfriend, golfer Kelsey O'Neal, in 2011, and they bought a home in Delray Beach, Florida. His daughter, Keira, was born in September 2019. He is a permanent resident of the United States.

Anderson plays the guitar and is a fan of the British rock band Dire Straits and Mark Knopfler.

== Career statistics ==
=== Grand Slam singles performance timeline ===
Key
W	F	SF	QF	#R	RR	Q#	DNQ	A	NH

(W) winner; (F) finalist; (SF) semifinalist; (QF) quarterfinalist; (#R) rounds 4, 3, 2, 1; (RR) round-robin stage; (Q#) qualification round; (DNQ) did not qualify; (A) absent; (NH) not held; (SR) strike rate (events won / competed); (W–L) win–loss record.

Tournament	2007	2008	2009	2010	2011	2012	2013	2014	2015	2016	2017	2018	2019	2020	2021	2022	2023	SR	W–L	Win%
Australian Open	A	1R	1R	1R	1R	3R	4R	4R	4R	1R	A	1R	2R	2R	1R	1R	A	0 / 14	13–14	48%
French Open	A	Q2	Q3	1R	2R	3R	4R	4R	3R	1R	4R	4R	A	3R	1R	A	A	0 / 11	19–11	63%
Wimbledon	A	1R	Q1	1R	2R	1R	3R	4R	4R	1R	4R	F	3R	NH	2R	A	A	0 / 12	21–12	63%
US Open	A	Q1	Q1	3R	3R	1R	2R	3R	QF	3R	F	4R	A	1R	2R	A	Q2	0 / 11	23–11	68%
Win–loss	0–0	0–2	0–1	2–4	4–4	4–4	9–4	11–4	12–4	2–4	12–3	12–4	3–2	3–3	2–4	0–1	0–0	0 / 48	76–48	61%

=== Grand Slam finals: 2 (2 runner-ups) ===
Result	Year	Tournament	Surface	Opponent	Score
Loss	2017	US Open	Hard	(Spain) Rafael Nadal	3–6, 3–6, 4–6
Loss	2018	Wimbledon	Grass	(Serbia) Novak Djokovic	2–6, 2–6, 6−7^{(3−7)}
