= 2017 Geneva Open – Doubles =

Doubles
- 2017 Geneva Open

Final
- Champions: (Netherlands) Jean-Julien Rojer (Romania) Horia Tecău
- Runners-up: (Colombia) Juan Sebastián Cabal (Colombia) Robert Farah
- Score: 2–6, 7–6^{(11–9)}, [10–6]

Events
Singles	Doubles
← 2016 ·	Geneva Open	· 2018 →

Steve Johnson and Sam Querrey were the defending champions, but lost in the quarterfinals to Juan Sebastián Cabal and Robert Farah.

Jean-Julien Rojer and Horia Tecău won the title, defeating Cabal and Farah in the final, 2–6, 7–6^{(11–9)}, [10–6].

== Seeds ==
1. (Netherlands) Jean-Julien Rojer / (Romania) Horia Tecău (champions)
2. (Colombia) Juan Sebastián Cabal / (Colombia) Robert Farah (final)
3. (Philippines) Treat Huey / (Sweden) Robert Lindstedt (quarterfinals, withdrew)
4. (Chile) Julio Peralta / (Argentina) Horacio Zeballos (first round)

== Draw ==
=== Key ===
- Q = Qualifier
- WC = Wild card
- LL = Lucky loser
- Alt = Alternate
- SE = Special exempt
- PR = Protected ranking
- ITF = ITF entry
- JE = Junior exempt
- w/o = Walkover
- r = Retired
- d = Defaulted
- SR = Special ranking

=== Draw ===
First round
1	(Netherlands) J-J Rojer (Romania) H Tecău	7^{7}	7^{7}
(Netherlands) W Koolhof (Netherlands) M Middelkoop	6^{5}	6^{3}
WC	(Portugal) J Sousa (Switzerland) C Sturdza	1	4
(Germany) P Petzschner (Austria) A Peya	6	6
4	(Chile) J Peralta (Argentina) H Zeballos	6^{5}	4
(Brazil) R Dutra Silva (Italy) P Lorenzi	7^{7}	6
PR	(Spain) D Marrero (Spain) T Robredo	7^{7}	6^{3}	[4]
(United States) S Lipsky (India) L Paes	6^{3}	7^{7}	[10]
WC	(Switzerland) J Nikles (Germany) T Pütz	w/o
(Germany) J-L Struff (Germany) M Zverev
(Serbia) J Tipsarević (Serbia) N Zimonjić	7^{7}	4	[8]
3	(Philippines) T Huey (Sweden) R Lindstedt	6^{5}	6	[10]
(United States) S Johnson (United States) S Querrey	6	7^{7}
(United States) R Harrison (New Zealand) M Venus	3	6^{3}
(Netherlands) R Haase (United Kingdom) D Inglot	2	6^{5}
2	(Colombia) JS Cabal (Colombia) R Farah	6	7^{7}

Quarterfinals
1	(Netherlands) J-J Rojer (Romania) H Tecău	6	6
(Germany) P Petzschner (Austria) A Peya	1	4
(Brazil) R Dutra Silva (Italy) P Lorenzi
(United States) S Lipsky (India) L Paes	w/o
WC	(Switzerland) J Nikles (Germany) T Pütz	w/o
3	(Philippines) T Huey (Sweden) R Lindstedt
(United States) S Johnson (United States) S Querrey	0	6^{6}
2	(Colombia) JS Cabal (Colombia) R Farah	6	7^{8}

Semifinals
1	(Netherlands) J-J Rojer (Romania) H Tecău	6	3	[10]
(United States) S Lipsky (India) L Paes	3	6	[3]
WC	(Switzerland) J Nikles (Germany) T Pütz	4	4
2	(Colombia) JS Cabal (Colombia) R Farah	6	6

Final
1	(Netherlands) J-J Rojer (Romania) H Tecău	2	7^{11}	[10]
2	(Colombia) JS Cabal (Colombia) R Farah	6	6^{9}	[6]
