= 2019 Abierto Mexicano Telcel – Men's singles =

Men's singles
- 2019 Abierto Mexicano Telcel

Final
- Champion: (Australia) Nick Kyrgios
- Runner-up: (Germany) Alexander Zverev
- Score: 6–3, 6–4

Details
- Draw: 32 (4 Q / 3 WC )
- Seeds: 8

Events
Singles	men	women
Doubles	men	women
- Abierto Mexicano Telcel

Nick Kyrgios defeated Alexander Zverev in the final, 6–3, 6–4 to win the men's singles tennis title at the 2019 Mexican Open. Kyrgios saved three match points en route to the title, in his second-round match against Rafael Nadal.

Juan Martín del Potro was the reigning champion, but withdrew due to injury before the tournament began.

== Seeds ==
1. (Spain) Rafael Nadal (second round)
2. (Germany) Alexander Zverev (final)
3. (United States) John Isner (semifinals)
4. (Argentina) Diego Schwartzman (second round)
5. (Australia) Alex de Minaur (quarterfinals)
6. (United States) Frances Tiafoe (second round)
7. (United States) Steve Johnson (second round)
8. (Australia) John Millman (quarterfinals)

== Draw ==
Key

- Q = Qualifier
- WC = Wild card
- LL = Lucky loser
- Alt = Alternate
- ITF = ITF entry
- PR = Protected ranking
- SR = Special ranking
- SE = Special exempt
- JE = Junior exempt
- JR = Junior Accelerator Programme entrant
- CO = College Accelerator Programme entrant
- NG = Next Gen Accelerator Program entrant
- w/o = Walkover
- r = Retired
- d = Defaulted

=== Finals ===
Semifinals
(Australia) Nick Kyrgios	7	5	7^{9}
3	(United States) John Isner	5	7	6^{7}
(United Kingdom) Cameron Norrie	6^{0}	3
2	(Germany) Alexander Zverev	7^{7}	6

Final
(Australia) Nick Kyrgios	6	6
2	(Germany) Alexander Zverev	3	4

=== Top half ===
First round
1	(Spain) R Nadal	6	6
(Germany) M Zverev	3	3
(Australia) N Kyrgios	6	7
(Italy) A Seppi	3	5
Q	(United States) R Harrison	4	6^{6}
(Switzerland) S Wawrinka	6	7^{8}
WC	(Mexico) G López Villaseñor	5	5
7	(United States) S Johnson	7	7
3	(United States) J Isner	6	4	6
(France) A Mannarino	3	6	3
(United States) S Querrey	6	6
LL	(Spain) G García López	3	2
Q	(Italy) F Gaio	7	4	2
(Germany) P Gojowczyk	5	6	6
Q	(Spain) M Granollers	3	4
8	(Australia) J Millman	6	6

Second round
1	(Spain) R Nadal	6	6^{2}	6^{6}
(Australia) N Kyrgios	3	7^{7}	7^{8}
(Switzerland) S Wawrinka	7^{7}	6
7	(United States) S Johnson	6^{5}	4
3	(United States) J Isner	6	6
(United States) S Querrey	4	4
(Germany) P Gojowczyk	0	2
8	(Australia) J Millman	6	6

Quarterfinals
(Australia) N Kyrgios	7	6^{3}	6
(Switzerland) S Wawrinka	5	7^{7}	4
3	(United States) J Isner	7^{7}	6^{4}	7^{7}
8	(Australia) J Millman	6^{2}	7^{7}	6^{4}

Semifinals
(Australia) N Kyrgios	7	5	7^{9}
3	(United States) J Isner	5	7	6^{7}

=== Bottom half ===
First round
6	(United States) F Tiafoe	3	6	6
(Australia) J Thompson	6	4	3
SE	(United States) M McDonald	6	6
WC	(United States) E Nava	1	3
(United Kingdom) C Norrie	6	2	6
(Japan) Y Nishioka	2	6	2
(Romania) M Copil	3	6	1
4	(Argentina) D Schwartzman	6	4	6
5	(Australia) A de Minaur	7^{7}	7^{7}
(Chile) N Jarry	6^{5}	6^{2}
(Serbia) D Lajović	7^{7}	2	5
(Spain) F López	6^{3}	6	7
(United States) T Sandgren	6^{5}	6^{3}
WC	(Spain) D Ferrer	7^{7}	7^{7}
Q	(Australia) A Popyrin	3	3
2	(Germany) A Zverev	6	6

Second round
6	(United States) F Tiafoe	7^{9}	5	3
SE	(United States) M McDonald	6^{7}	7	6
(United Kingdom) C Norrie	7^{7}	4	6
4	(Argentina) D Schwartzman	6^{5}	6	3
5	(Australia) A de Minaur	w/o
(Spain) F López
WC	(Spain) D Ferrer	6^{0}	1
2	(Germany) A Zverev	7^{7}	6

Quarterfinals
SE	(United States) M McDonald	3	2
(United Kingdom) C Norrie	6	6
5	(Australia) A de Minaur	4	4
2	(Germany) A Zverev	6	6

Semifinals
(United Kingdom) C Norrie	6^{0}	3
2	(Germany) A Zverev	7^{7}	6

== Qualifying ==
=== Seeds ===
1. (Australia) Jordan Thompson (moved to main draw)
2. (Australia) Bernard Tomic (qualifying competition, withdrew)
3. (United States) Ryan Harrison (qualified)
4. (Spain) Guillermo García López (qualifying competition, lucky loser)
5. (Spain) Marcel Granollers (qualified)
6. (Australia) Alexei Popyrin (qualified)
7. (Spain) Adrián Menéndez Maceiras (qualifying competition)
8. (Italy) Federico Gaio (qualified)

=== Qualifiers ===
1. (Italy) Federico Gaio
2. (Australia) Alexei Popyrin
3. (United States) Ryan Harrison
4. (Spain) Marcel Granollers

=== Lucky loser ===
1. (Spain) Guillermo García López

=== Qualifying draw ===
==== First qualifier ====
First round
Alt	(Ecuador) Emilio Gómez	6	6
(Colombia) Daniel Elahi Galán	4	4
Alt	(Croatia) Ante Pavić	2	3
8	(Italy) Federico Gaio	6	6

Qualifying competition
Alt	(Ecuador) Emilio Gómez	1	6	6^{6}
8	(Italy) Federico Gaio	6	4	7^{8}

==== Second qualifier ====
First round
2	(Australia) Bernard Tomic	6	5	6
WC	(Mexico) Lucas Gómez	1	7	0
(Spain) Roberto Ortega Olmedo	2	0^{r}
6	(Australia) Alexei Popyrin	6	0

Qualifying competition
2	(Australia) Bernard Tomic
6	(Australia) Alexei Popyrin	w/o

==== Third qualifier ====
First round
3	(United States) Ryan Harrison	7	6
WC	(Mexico) Alex Hernández	5	2
WC	(Mexico) Luis Patiño	2	3
7	(Spain) Adrián Menéndez Maceiras	6	6

Qualifying competition
3	(United States) Ryan Harrison	6	6
7	(Spain) Adrián Menéndez Maceiras	2	4

==== Fourth qualifier ====
First round
4	(Spain) Guillermo García López	6	6
(Dominican Republic) Roberto Cid Subervi	3	3
(Germany) Kevin Krawietz	5	4
5	(Spain) Marcel Granollers	7	6

Qualifying competition
4	(Spain) Guillermo García López	4	6	1
5	(Spain) Marcel Granollers	6	3	6
