= 2016 Geneva Open – Doubles =

Doubles
- 2016 Geneva Open

Final
- Champions: (United States) Steve Johnson (United States) Sam Querrey
- Runners-up: (South Africa) Raven Klaasen (United States) Rajeev Ram
- Score: 6–4, 6–1

Events
| Singles | Doubles |
| ← 2015 · | Geneva Open | · 2017 → |

Juan Sebastián Cabal and Robert Farah were the defending champions, but chose to compete in Nice instead.
Steve Johnson and Sam Querrey won the title, defeating Raven Klaasen and Rajeev Ram in the final, 6–4, 6–1.

== Seeds ==
1. (South Africa) Raven Klaasen / (United States) Rajeev Ram (final)
2. (Austria) Oliver Marach / (France) Fabrice Martin (first round)
3. (United States) Steve Johnson / (United States) Sam Querrey (champions)
4. (Israel) Jonathan Erlich / (United Kingdom) Colin Fleming (first round)

== Draw ==
=== Key ===
- Q = Qualifier
- WC = Wild card
- LL = Lucky loser
- Alt = Alternate
- SE = Special exempt
- PR = Protected ranking
- ITF = ITF entry
- JE = Junior exempt
- w/o = Walkover
- r = Retired
- d = Defaulted
- SR = Special ranking

=== Draw ===
First round
1 | (South Africa) R Klaasen (United States) R Ram | 6^{5} | 7^{7} | [10]
(Russia) M Elgin (Russia) T Gabashvili | 7^{7} | 6^{3} | [5]
WC | (Romania) V Hănescu (Switzerland) C Sturdza | 1 | 1
(Lithuania) R Berankis (Russia) A Kuznetsov | 6 | 6
4 | (Israel) J Erlich (United Kingdom) C Fleming | 3 | 6^{5}
PR | (Croatia) M Draganja (United Kingdom) D Inglot | 6 | 7^{7}
(New Zealand) M Daniell (New Zealand) A Sitak | 4 | 2
(Poland) M Fyrstenberg (Mexico) S González | 6 | 6
(Poland) M Kowalczyk (Croatia) A Šančić | 6 | 5 | [4]
WC | (Argentina) M Peña López (Serbia) J Tipsarević | 4 | 7 | [10]
(United Kingdom) K Skupski (United Kingdom) N Skupski | 6^{1} | 3
3 | (United States) S Johnson (United States) S Querrey | 7^{7} | 6
(Belarus) A Bury (Slovakia) I Zelenay | 6^{2} | 2
(Austria) J Knowle (Czech Republic) L Rosol | 7^{7} | 6
(Netherlands) W Koolhof (Netherlands) M Middelkoop | 6 | 2 | [10]
2 | (Austria) O Marach (France) F Martin | 4 | 6 | [8]

Quarterfinals
1 | (South Africa) R Klaasen (United States) R Ram | 6 | 6
(Lithuania) R Berankis (Russia) A Kuznetsov | 4 | 2
PR | (Croatia) M Draganja (United Kingdom) D Inglot | 4 | 3
(Poland) M Fyrstenberg (Mexico) S González | 6 | 6
WC | (Argentina) M Peña López (Serbia) J Tipsarević | 6^{3} | 1
3 | (United States) S Johnson (United States) S Querrey | 7^{7} | 6
(Austria) J Knowle (Czech Republic) L Rosol | 6^{6} | 7 | [10]
(Netherlands) W Koolhof (Netherlands) M Middelkoop | 7^{8} | 5 | [7]

Semifinals
1 | (South Africa) R Klaasen (United States) R Ram | 6 | 6
(Poland) M Fyrstenberg (Mexico) S González | 3 | 4
3 | (United States) S Johnson (United States) S Querrey | 6 | 3 | [10]
(Austria) J Knowle (Czech Republic) L Rosol | 3 | 6 | [8]

Final
1 | (South Africa) R Klaasen (United States) R Ram | 4 | 1
3 | (United States) S Johnson (United States) S Querrey | 6 | 6
