= 2019 Abierto Mexicano Telcel =

- Date: 25 February – 2 March
- Edition: 26th (men) / 19th (women)
- Draw: 32S / 16D
- Prize money: $1,931,110 (ATP) $250,000 (WTA)
- Surface: Hard, outdoor
- Location: Acapulco, Mexico
- Venue: Princess Mundo Imperial

Champions

Men's singles
- (Australia) Nick Kyrgios

Women's singles
- (China) Wang Yafan

Men's doubles
- (Germany) Alexander Zverev / (Germany) Mischa Zverev

Women's doubles
- (Belarus) Victoria Azarenka / (China) Zheng Saisai
| ← 2018 · | Mexican Open | · 2020 → |

The 2019 Mexican Open was a professional tennis tournament played on outdoor hard courts. It was the 26th edition of the men's Mexican Open (19th for the women), and was part of the 2019 ATP Tour and the 2019 WTA Tour. It took place in Acapulco, Mexico between 25 February and 2 March 2019, at the Princess Mundo Imperial.

== Points and prize money ==
=== Point distribution ===
| Event | W | F | SF | QF | Round of 16 | Round of 32 | Q | Q2 | Q1 |
| Men's singles | 500 | 300 | 180 | 90 | 45 | 0 | 20 | 10 | 0 |
| Men's doubles | 500 | 300 | 180 | 90 | 0 | — | 45 | 25 | 0 |
| Women's singles | 280 | 180 | 110 | 60 | 30 | 1 | 18 | 12 | 1 |
| Women's doubles | 280 | 180 | 110 | 60 | 1 | — | — | — | — |

=== Prize money ===
| Event | W | F | SF | QF | Round of 16 | Round of 32^{1} | Q2 | Q1 |
| Men's singles | $367,630 | $184,640 | $93,160 | $48,470 | $24,470 | $13,540 | $5,210 | $2,600 |
| Men's doubles * | $115,510 | $56,540 | $28,350 | $14,550 | $7,520 | — | — | — |
| Women's singles | $43,000 | $21,400 | $11,500 | $6,175 | $3,400 | $2,100 | $1,020 | $600 |
| Women's doubles * | $12,300 | $6,400 | $3,435 | $1,820 | $960 | — | — | — |

_{^{1} Qualifiers prize money is also the Round of 32 prize money}
_{* per team}

== ATP singles main-draw entrants ==
=== Seeds ===
| Country | Player | Ranking^{1} | Seed |
|---|---|---|---|
| ESP | Rafael Nadal | 2 | 1 |
| GER | Alexander Zverev | 3 | 2 |
| USA | John Isner | 9 | 3 |
| ARG | Diego Schwartzman | 19 | 4 |
| AUS | Alex de Minaur | 27 | 5 |
| USA | Frances Tiafoe | 29 | 6 |
| USA | Steve Johnson | 34 | 7 |
| AUS | John Millman | 36 | 8 |

- ^{1} Rankings as of February 18, 2019.

=== Other entrants ===
The following players received wildcards into the main draw:

- (Spain) David Ferrer
- (Mexico) Gerardo López Villaseñor
- (United States) Emilio Nava

The following player received entry via a special exempt:

- (United States) Mackenzie McDonald

The following players received entry from the qualifying draw:

- (Italy) Federico Gaio
- (Spain) Marcel Granollers
- (United States) Ryan Harrison
- (Australia) Alexei Popyrin

The following player received entry as a lucky loser:

- (Spain) Guillermo García López

=== Withdrawals ===
- (South Africa) Kevin Anderson → replaced by (Germany) Mischa Zverev
- (Bulgaria) Grigor Dimitrov → replaced by (United Kingdom) Cameron Norrie
- (United States) Taylor Fritz → replaced by (Spain) Guillermo García López
- (Slovakia) Martin Kližan → replaced by (Japan) Yoshihito Nishioka

== ATP doubles main-draw entrants ==
=== Seeds ===
| Country | Player | Country | Player | Rank^{1} | Seed |
|---|---|---|---|---|---|
| GBR | Jamie Murray | BRA | Bruno Soares | 10 | 1 |
| USA | Bob Bryan | USA | Mike Bryan | 18 | 2 |
| COL | Juan Sebastián Cabal | COL | Robert Farah | 20 | 3 |
| POL | Łukasz Kubot | BRA | Marcelo Melo | 20 | 4 |

- ^{1} Rankings as of February 18, 2019.

=== Other entrants ===
The following pairs received wildcards into the doubles main draw:

- (Mexico) Santiago González / (Pakistan) Aisam-ul-Haq Qureshi
- (United States) Nicholas Monroe / (Mexico) Miguel Ángel Reyes-Varela

The following pair received entry from the qualifying draw:

- (Germany) Peter Gojowczyk / (Germany) Kevin Krawietz

== WTA singles main-draw entrants ==
=== Seeds ===
| Country | Player | Ranking^{1} | Seed |
|---|---|---|---|
| USA | Sloane Stephens | 3 | 1 |
| USA | Danielle Collins | 24 | 2 |
| CRO | Donna Vekić | 25 | 3 |
| ROU | Mihaela Buzărnescu | 29 | 4 |
| USA | Sofia Kenin | 37 | 5 |
| GRE | Maria Sakkari | 38 | 6 |
| CHN | Zheng Saisai | 41 | 7 |
| GBR | Johanna Konta | 42 | 8 |

- ^{1} Rankings as of February 18, 2019.

=== Other entrants ===
The following players received wildcards into the main draw:

- (Belarus) Victoria Azarenka
- (Mexico) Renata Zarazúa
- (Switzerland) Jil Teichmann

The following players received entry from the qualifying draw:

- (Romania) Irina Bara
- (Belgium) Ysaline Bonaventure
- (Russia) Varvara Flink
- (Brazil) Beatriz Haddad Maia
- (United States) Christina McHale
- (Switzerland) Conny Perrin

The following player received entry as a lucky loser:

- (Italy) Martina Trevisan

=== Withdrawals ===
- (Russia) Ekaterina Alexandrova → replaced by (Germany) Laura Siegemund
- (Canada) Eugenie Bouchard → replaced by (United States) Amanda Anisimova
- (Chinese Taipei) Hsieh Su-wei → replaced by (Czech Republic) Marie Bouzková
- (Australia) Ajla Tomljanović → replaced by (Canada) Bianca Andreescu
- (Switzerland) Stefanie Vögele → replaced by (Italy) Martina Trevisan

== WTA doubles main-draw entrants ==
=== Seeds ===
| Country | Player | Country | Player | Rank^{1} | Seed |
|---|---|---|---|---|---|
| ROU | Irina Bara | ROU | Mihaela Buzărnescu | 88 | 1 |
| SLO | Dalila Jakupović | RUS | Irina Khromacheva | 93 | 2 |
| USA | Desirae Krawczyk | MEX | Giuliana Olmos | 129 | 3 |
| CHI | Alexa Guarachi | USA | Sabrina Santamaria | 132 | 4 |

- ^{1} Rankings as of February 18, 2019.

=== Other entrants ===
The following pair received a wildcard into the doubles main draw:

- (Czech Republic) Marie Bouzková / (Mexico) Renata Zarazúa
- (Mexico) Victoria Rodríguez / (Mexico) Ana Sofía Sánchez

== Champions ==
=== Men's singles ===
- (Australia) Nick Kyrgios def. (Germany) Alexander Zverev, 6–3, 6–4

=== Women's singles ===
- (China) Wang Yafan def. (United States) Sofia Kenin, 2–6, 6–3, 7–5

=== Men's doubles ===
- (Germany) Alexander Zverev / (Germany) Mischa Zverev def. (United States) Austin Krajicek / (New Zealand) Artem Sitak, 2–6, 7–6^{(7–4)}, [10–5]

=== Women's doubles ===
- (Belarus) Victoria Azarenka / (China) Zheng Saisai def. (United States) Desirae Krawczyk / (Mexico) Giuliana Olmos, 6–1, 6–2
