= 2016 Geneva Open – Singles =

Singles
- 2016 Geneva Open

Final
- Champion: (Switzerland) Stan Wawrinka
- Runner-up: (Croatia) Marin Čilić
- Score: 6–4, 7–6^{(13–11)}

Details
- Draw: 28
- Seeds: 8

Events
Singles	Doubles
← 2015 ·	Geneva Open	· 2017 →

Thomaz Bellucci was the defending champion, but lost in the second round to Federico Delbonis.

Stan Wawrinka won the title, defeating Marin Čilić in the final, 6–4, 7–6^{(13–11)}.

== Seeds ==
The top four seeds receive a bye into the second round.

1. (Switzerland) Stan Wawrinka (champion)
2. (Spain) David Ferrer (semifinals)
3. (Croatia) Marin Čilić (final)
4. (United States) John Isner (second round)
5. (Germany) Philipp Kohlschreiber (withdrew)
6. (Argentina) Federico Delbonis (quarterfinals)
7. (United States) Steve Johnson (second round)
8. (United States) Sam Querrey (first round)

== Draw ==
=== Key ===
- Q = Qualifier
- WC = Wild card
- LL = Lucky loser
- Alt = Alternate
- SE = Special exempt
- PR = Protected ranking
- ITF = ITF entry
- JE = Junior exempt
- w/o = Walkover
- r = Retired
- d = Defaulted
- SR = Special ranking

=== Finals ===
Semifinals
1	(Switzerland) Stan Wawrinka	6	4	6
(Czech Republic) Lukáš Rosol	2	6	3
3/WC	(Croatia) Marin Čilić	7	7
2/WC	(Spain) David Ferrer	5	5

Final
1	(Switzerland) Stan Wawrinka	6	7^{13}
3/WC	(Croatia) Marin Čilić	4	6^{11}

=== Top half ===
First round
(Spain) A Ramos Viñolas	6	2	6
(Russia) T Gabashvili	4	6	3
Q	(Chile) C Garín	2	5
(Spain) P Carreño Busta	6	7
(Spain) Í Cervantes	6	6
Q	(Germany) A Beck	1	3
Q	(Spain) R Ortega Olmedo	3	4
(Czech Republic) L Rosol	6	6
(Israel) D Sela	3	1
(Russia) A Kuznetsov	6	6
(Russia) M Youzhny	3	5
7	(United States) S Johnson	6	7

Second round
1	(Switzerland) S Wawrinka	6	6
(Spain) A Ramos Viñolas	1	1
(Spain) P Carreño Busta	6	6
(Spain) Í Cervantes	2	4
4	(United States) J Isner	7	6^{5}	6^{5}
(Czech Republic) L Rosol	5	7^{7}	7^{7}
(Russia) A Kuznetsov	7	6
7	(United States) S Johnson	5	4

Quarterfinals
1	(Switzerland) S Wawrinka	6	6
(Spain) P Carreño Busta	3	1
(Czech Republic) L Rosol	2	6	6
(Russia) A Kuznetsov	6	1	0

Semifinals
1	(Switzerland) S Wawrinka	6	4	6
(Czech Republic) L Rosol	2	6	3

=== Bottom half ===
First round
6	(Argentina) F Delbonis	6	7^{8}
WC	(Serbia) J Tipsarević	1	6^{6}
(Kazakhstan) M Kukushkin	2	1
(Brazil) T Bellucci	6	6
(Latvia) E Gulbis	7	7
(Lithuania) R Berankis	5	5
8	(United States) S Querrey	6^{5}	4
(Spain) G García López	7^{7}	6
Q	(Russia) E Donskoy	6^{5}	6	3
(United States) R Ram	7^{7}	4	6
LL	(Germany) F Mayer	2	3
(Uzbekistan) D Istomin	6	6

Second round
6	(Argentina) F Delbonis	6	6
(Brazil) T Bellucci	3	0
(Latvia) E Gulbis	4	6^{5}
3/WC	(Croatia) M Čilić	6	7^{7}
(Spain) G García López	6	7^{7}
(United States) R Ram	4	6^{4}
(Uzbekistan) D Istomin	6	3^{r}
2/WC	(Spain) D Ferrer	3	2

Quarterfinals
6	(Argentina) F Delbonis	4	3
3/WC	(Croatia) M Čilić	6	6
(Spain) G García López	2	2
2/WC	(Spain) D Ferrer	6	6

Semifinals
3/WC	(Croatia) M Čilić	7	7
2/WC	(Spain) D Ferrer	5	5

== Qualifying ==
=== Seeds ===
1. (Russia) Evgeny Donskoy (qualified)
2. (Switzerland) Marco Chiudinelli (first round)
3. (Germany) Florian Mayer (qualifying competition, lucky loser)
4. (Austria) Michael Linzer (first round)
5. (Italy) Lorenzo Giustino (first round)
6. (Russia) Ivan Nedelko (first round)
7. (Czech Republic) Michal Konečný (first round)
8. (Colombia) Nicolás Barrientos (first round)

=== Qualifiers ===
1. (Russia) Evgeny Donskoy
2. (Germany) Andreas Beck
3. (Chile) Cristian Garín
4. (Spain) Roberto Ortega Olmedo

=== Lucky losers ===
1. (Germany) Florian Mayer

=== Qualifying draw ===
==== First qualifier ====
First round
1	(Russia) Evgeny Donskoy	7^{7}	6
WC	(Argentina) Manuel Peña López	6^{3}	3
(Bosnia and Herzegovina) Tomislav Brkić	4	6	6
5	(Italy) Lorenzo Giustino	6	4	3

Qualifying competition
1	(Russia) Evgeny Donskoy	6	3	7^{7}
(Bosnia and Herzegovina) Tomislav Brkić	3	6	6^{3}

==== Second qualifier ====
First round
2	(Switzerland) Marco Chiudinelli	3	2
(Switzerland) Yann Marti	6	6
(Germany) Andreas Beck	6	6
6	(Russia) Ivan Nedelko	4	4

Qualifying competition
(Switzerland) Yann Marti	1	2
(Germany) Andreas Beck	6	6

==== Third qualifier ====
First round
3	(Germany) Florian Mayer	6	6
(Ecuador) Emilio Gómez	3	4
(Chile) Cristian Garín	6	6
7	(Czech Republic) Michal Konečný	2	1

Qualifying competition
3	(Germany) Florian Mayer	6	4	3
(Chile) Cristian Garín	3	6	6

==== Fourth qualifier ====
First round
4	(Austria) Michael Linzer	6	2	4
(Spain) Roberto Ortega Olmedo	3	6	6
WC	(Switzerland) Johan Nikles	2	6	6
8	(Colombia) Nicolás Barrientos	6	2	3

Qualifying competition
(Spain) Roberto Ortega Olmedo	6	7^{8}
WC	(Switzerland) Johan Nikles	2	6^{6}
