= 2016 Geneva Open =

- Date: 15–21 May
- Edition: 14th
- Category: ATP World Tour 250
- Draw: 28S / 16D
- Prize money: €499,645
- Surface: Clay
- Location: Geneva, Switzerland
- Venue: Tennis Club de Genève

Champions

Singles
- (Switzerland) Stan Wawrinka

Doubles
- (United States) Steve Johnson / (United States) Sam Querrey
- Geneva Open

The 2016 Geneva Open, also known as the Banque Eric Sturdza Geneva Open for sponsorship reasons, was a men's tennis tournament played on outdoor clay courts. It was the 14th edition of the Geneva Open and part of the ATP World Tour 250 series of the 2016 ATP World Tour. It took place at the Tennis Club de Genève in Geneva, Switzerland, from 15 May through 21 May 2016. First-seeded Stan Wawrinka won the singles title.

== Finals ==
=== Singles ===
- (Switzerland) Stan Wawrinka defeated (Croatia) Marin Čilić, 6–4, 7–6^{(13–11)}

=== Doubles ===
- (United States) Steve Johnson / (United States) Sam Querrey defeated (South Africa) Raven Klaasen / (United States) Rajeev Ram, 6–4, 6–1

== Singles main draw entrants ==
=== Seeds ===
Country	Player	Rank^{1}	Seed
SUI	Stan Wawrinka	4	1
ESP	David Ferrer	9	2
CRO	Marin Čilić	11	3
USA	John Isner	16	4
~~GER~~	~~Philipp Kohlschreiber~~	~~26~~	~~5~~
ARG	Federico Delbonis	33	6
USA	Steve Johnson	34	7
USA	Sam Querrey	36	8

- Rankings are as of May 9, 2016.

=== Other entrants ===
The following players received wildcards into the singles main draw:

- (Croatia) Marin Čilić
- (Spain) David Ferrer
- (Serbia) Janko Tipsarević

The following players received entry from the qualifying draw:

- (Germany) Andreas Beck
- (Russia) Evgeny Donskoy
- (Chile) Christian Garín
- (Spain) Roberto Ortega Olmedo

The following player received entry as a lucky loser:

- (Germany) Florian Mayer

=== Withdrawals ===
Before the tournament

- (Cyprus) Marcos Baghdatis →replaced by (Russia) Mikhail Youzhny
- (Germany) Philipp Kohlschreiber →replaced by (Latvia) Ernests Gulbis
- (Australia) John Millman →replaced by (Lithuania) Ričardas Berankis

=== Retirements ===
- (Uzbekistan) Denis Istomin

== Doubles main draw entrants ==
=== Seeds ===
Country	Player	Country	Player	Rank^{1}	Seed
RSA	Raven Klaasen	USA	Rajeev Ram	44	1
AUT	Oliver Marach	FRA	Fabrice Martin	88	2
USA	Steve Johnson	USA	Sam Querrey	93	3
ISR	Jonathan Erlich	GBR	Colin Fleming	106	4

- Rankings are as of May 9, 2016.

=== Other entrants ===
The following pairs received wildcards into the doubles main draw:

- (Romania) Victor Hănescu / (Switzerland) Constantin Sturdza
- (Argentina) Manuel Peña López / (Serbia) Janko Tipsarević
