= 2017 Geneva Open – Singles =

Singles
- 2017 Geneva Open

Final
- Champion: (Switzerland) Stan Wawrinka
- Runner-up: (Germany) Mischa Zverev
- Score: 4–6, 6–3, 6–3

Details
- Draw: 28 (4 Q / 3 WC )
- Seeds: 8

Events
Singles	Doubles
← 2016 ·	Geneva Open	· 2018 →

Stan Wawrinka was the defending champion and successfully defended his title, defeating Mischa Zverev in the final, 4–6, 6–3, 6–3.

== Seeds ==
The top four seeds receive a bye into the second round.

1. (Switzerland) Stan Wawrinka (champion)
2. (Japan) Kei Nishikori (semifinals)
3. (Spain) Albert Ramos Viñolas (second round)
4. (United States) John Isner (second round)
5. (United States) Steve Johnson (quarterfinals)
6. (United States) Sam Querrey (quarterfinals)
7. (Italy) Paolo Lorenzi (first round)
8. (Serbia) Viktor Troicki (withdrew)
9. (United States) Ryan Harrison (first round)

== Draw ==
=== Key ===
- Q = Qualifier
- WC = Wild card
- LL = Lucky loser
- Alt = Alternate
- SE = Special exempt
- PR = Protected ranking
- ITF = ITF entry
- JE = Junior exempt
- w/o = Walkover
- r = Retired
- d = Defaulted
- SR = Special ranking

=== Finals ===
Semifinals
1/WC	(Switzerland) Stan Wawrinka	6	7^{7}
(Russia) Andrey Kuznetsov	3	6^{4}
Q	(Germany) Mischa Zverev	6	3	6
2/WC	(Japan) Kei Nishikori	4	6	3

Final
1/WC	(Switzerland) Stan Wawrinka	4	6	6
Q	(Germany) Mischa Zverev	6	3	3

=== Top half ===
First round
(Brazil) R Dutra Silva	6	7^{7}
(Portugal) J Sousa	4	6^{5}
PR	(Spain) T Robredo	6	3	2
Q	(Croatia) F Škugor	3	6	6
Q	(Germany) D Altmaier	3	4
6	(United States) S Querrey	6	6
(Brazil) T Bellucci	6	4	1
(Russia) A Kuznetsov	3	6	6
(Germany) J-L Struff	3	6	6^{2}
LL	(Germany) C-M Stebe	6	4	7^{7}
WC	(Serbia) J Tipsarević	6	7^{7}
9	(United States) R Harrison	4	6^{5}

Second round
1/WC	(Switzerland) S Wawrinka	5
(Brazil) R Dutra Silva	2^{r}
Q	(Croatia) F Škugor	2	3
6	(United States) S Querrey	6	6
3	(Spain) A Ramos Viñolas	5	1
(Russia) A Kuznetsov	7	6
LL	(Germany) C-M Stebe	6	0
WC	(Serbia) J Tipsarević	4	1^{r}

Quarterfinals
1/WC	(Switzerland) S Wawrinka	4	7	6
6	(United States) S Querrey	6	5	2
(Russia) A Kuznetsov	6	1	7
LL	(Germany) C-M Stebe	2	6	5

Semifinals
1/WC	(Switzerland) S Wawrinka	6	7^{7}
(Russia) A Kuznetsov	3	6^{4}

=== Bottom half ===
First round
5	(United States) S Johnson	6	6
(France) S Robert	3	3
(Argentina) H Zeballos	6	0	7
(Serbia) D Lajović	4	6	5
(Netherlands) R Haase	7	6^{6}	3
Q	(Germany) M Zverev	5	7^{8}	6
7	(Italy) P Lorenzi	5	6^{1}
(South Africa) K Anderson	7	7^{7}
(United States) J Donaldson	6	6
(Dominican Republic) V Estrella Burgos	2	4
(Kazakhstan) M Kukushkin	6	6
Q	(Italy) R Marcora	2	2

Second round
5	(United States) S Johnson	6	6
(Argentina) H Zeballos	1	3
Q	(Germany) M Zverev	6	6^{5}	6
4	(United States) J Isner	4	7^{7}	3
(South Africa) K Anderson	6	6^{7}	6
(United States) J Donaldson	3	7^{9}	2
(Kazakhstan) M Kukushkin	4	3
2/WC	(Japan) K Nishikori	6	6

Quarterfinals
5	(United States) S Johnson	4	5
Q	(Germany) M Zverev	6	7
(South Africa) K Anderson	6	4	6^{6}
2/WC	(Japan) K Nishikori	2	6	7^{8}

Semifinals
Q	(Germany) M Zverev	6	3	6
2/WC	(Japan) K Nishikori	4	6	3

== Qualifying ==
=== Seeds ===
1. (Germany) Mischa Zverev (qualified)
2. (Switzerland) Marco Chiudinelli (qualifying competition)
3. (Czech Republic) Petr Michnev (qualifying competition)
4. (Dominican Republic) José Hernández-Fernández (first round)
5. (Italy) Matteo Berrettini (first round)
6. (Spain) Pere Riba (first round, retired)
7. (Germany) Daniel Altmaier (qualified)
8. (Brazil) André Ghem (first round, retired)

=== Qualifiers ===
1. (Germany) Mischa Zverev
2. (Italy) Roberto Marcora
3. (Germany) Daniel Altmaier
4. (Croatia) Franko Škugor

=== Lucky loser ===
1. (Germany) Cedrik-Marcel Stebe

=== Qualifying draw ===
==== First qualifier ====
First round
1	(Germany) Mischa Zverev	6	6
WC	(Germany) Louis Wessels	1	4
PR	(Germany) Tim Pütz	2
8	(Brazil) André Ghem	1^{r}

Qualifying competition
1	(Germany) Mischa Zverev	6	6^{6}	7
PR	(Germany) Tim Pütz	3	7^{8}	5

==== Second qualifier ====
First round
2	(Switzerland) Marco Chiudinelli	7	7^{7}
(Colombia) Alejandro Falla	5	6^{3}
PR	(Italy) Roberto Marcora	3
6	(Spain) Pere Riba	0^{r}

Qualifying competition
2	(Switzerland) Marco Chiudinelli	4	1
PR	(Italy) Roberto Marcora	6	6

==== Third qualifier ====
First round
3	(Czech Republic) Petr Michnev	6	6
WC	(Switzerland) Raphael Baltensperger	2	4
PR	(United Kingdom) Alexander Ward	4	3
7	(Germany) Daniel Altmaier	6	6

Qualifying competition
3	(Czech Republic) Petr Michnev	2	4
7	(Germany) Daniel Altmaier	6	6

==== Fourth qualifier ====
First round
4	(Dominican Republic) José Hernández-Fernández	6	4	3
(Germany) Cedrik-Marcel Stebe	2	6	6
(Croatia) Franko Škugor	1	6	6
5	(Italy) Matteo Berrettini	6	3	2

Qualifying competition
(Germany) Cedrik-Marcel Stebe	5	7	6^{3}
(Croatia) Franko Škugor	7	5	7^{7}
