= 2017 Geneva Open =

- Date: 21–27 May
- Edition: 15th
- Category: ATP World Tour 250
- Draw: 28S / 16D
- Surface: Clay
- Location: Geneva, Switzerland
- Venue: Tennis Club de Genève

Champions

Singles
- (Switzerland) Stan Wawrinka

Doubles
- (Netherlands) Jean-Julien Rojer / (Romania) Horia Tecău
- Geneva Open

The 2017 Geneva Open, also known as the 2017 Banque Eric Sturdza Geneva Open for sponsorship reasons, was a men's tennis tournament played on outdoor clay courts. It was the 15th edition of the Geneva Open and part of the ATP World Tour 250 series of the 2017 ATP World Tour. It took place at the Tennis Club de Genève in Geneva, Switzerland, from 21 May through 27 May 2017. First-seeded Stan Wawrinka won the singles title.

== Finals ==
=== Singles ===
- (Switzerland) Stan Wawrinka defeated (Germany) Mischa Zverev 4–6, 6–3, 6–3

=== Doubles ===
- (Netherlands) Jean-Julien Rojer / (Romania) Horia Tecău defeated (Colombia) Juan Sebastián Cabal / (Colombia) Robert Farah, 2–6, 7–6^{(11–9)}, [10–6]

== Singles main draw entrants ==
=== Seeds ===
Country	Player	Rank^{1}	Seed
SUI	Stan Wawrinka	3	1
JPN	Kei Nishikori	9	2
ESP	Albert Ramos Viñolas	19	3
USA	John Isner	24	4
USA	Steve Johnson	25	5
USA	Sam Querrey	28	6
ITA	Paolo Lorenzi	33	7
USA	Ryan Harrison	42	8

- Rankings are as of May 15, 2017.

=== Other entrants ===
The following players received wildcards into the singles main draw:

- (Japan) Kei Nishikori
- (Serbia) Janko Tipsarević
- (Switzerland) Stan Wawrinka

The following player received entry using a protected ranking:

- (Spain) Tommy Robredo

The following players received entry from the qualifying draw:

- (Germany) Daniel Altmaier
- (Italy) Roberto Marcora
- (Croatia) Franko Škugor
- (Germany) Mischa Zverev

The following player received entry as a lucky loser:

- (Germany) Cedrik-Marcel Stebe

=== Withdrawals ===
Before the tournament

- (Slovakia) Martin Kližan →replaced by (Serbia) Dušan Lajović
- (Chinese Taipei) Lu Yen-hsun →replaced by (Argentina) Horacio Zeballos
- (France) Adrian Mannarino →replaced by (France) Stéphane Robert
- (Serbia) Viktor Troicki →replaced by (Germany) Cedrik-Marcel Stebe

=== Retirements ===
- (Brazil) Rogério Dutra Silva
- (Serbia) Janko Tipsarević

== Doubles main draw entrants ==
=== Seeds ===
Country	Player	Country	Player	Rank^{1}	Seed
NED	Jean-Julien Rojer	ROU	Horia Tecău	45	1
COL	Juan Sebastián Cabal	COL	Robert Farah	68	2
PHI	Treat Huey	SWE	Robert Lindstedt	85	3
CHI	Julio Peralta	ARG	Horacio Zeballos	85	4

- Rankings are as of May 15, 2017.

=== Other entrants ===
The following pairs received wildcards into the doubles main draw:

- (Switzerland) Johan Nikles / (Germany) Tim Pütz
- (Portugal) João Sousa / (Switzerland) Constantin Sturdza

=== Withdrawals ===
Before the tournament

- (Germany) Jan-Lennard Struff

During the tournament

- (Brazil) Rogério Dutra Silva
- (Sweden) Robert Lindstedt
