= 2019 Abierto Mexicano Telcel – Women's singles =

Women's singles
- 2019 Abierto Mexicano Telcel

Final
- Champion: (China) Wang Yafan
- Runner-up: (United States) Sofia Kenin
- Score: 2–6, 6–3, 7–5

Details
- Draw: 32
- Seeds: 8

Events
Singles	men	women
Doubles	men	women
- Abierto Mexicano Telcel

Lesia Tsurenko was the two-time defending champion, but chose not to defend her title.

Wang Yafan won her first WTA singles title, defeating Sofia Kenin in the final, 2–6, 6–3, 7–5.

== Seeds ==
1. (United States) Sloane Stephens (second round)
2. (United States) Danielle Collins (first round)
3. (Croatia) Donna Vekić (semifinals)
4. (Romania) Mihaela Buzărnescu (second round)
5. (United States) Sofia Kenin (final)
6. (Greece) Maria Sakkari (first round)
7. (China) Zheng Saisai (quarterfinals)
8. (United Kingdom) Johanna Konta (quarterfinals)

== Draw ==
Key

- Q = Qualifier
- WC = Wild card
- LL = Lucky loser
- Alt = Alternate
- ITF = ITF entry
- PR = Protected ranking
- SR = Special ranking
- SE = Special exempt
- JE = Junior exempt
- JR = Junior Accelerator Programme entrant
- CO = College Accelerator Programme entrant
- NG = Next Gen Accelerator Program entrant
- w/o = Walkover
- r = Retired
- d = Defaulted

=== Finals ===
Semifinals
(China) Wang Yafan	2	6	6
3	(Croatia) Donna Vekic	6	3	1
(Canada) Bianca Andreescu	4	6	5
5	(United States) Sofia Kenin	6	3	7

Final
(China) Wang Yafan	2	6	7
5	(United States) Sofia Kenin	6	3	5

=== Top half ===
First round
1	(United States) S Stephens	6	6
(France) P Parmentier	2	2
Q	(Brazil) B Haddad Maia	6	6
Q	(Romania) I Bara	0	2
(China) Y Wang	6	6
(Czech Republic) M Bouzková	2	2
(Puerto Rico) M Puig	7	4	6
6	(Greece) M Sakkari	5	6	0
3	(Croatia) D Vekić	6	6
(Japan) M Doi	0	3
Q	(Belgium) Y Bonaventure	3	6	2
Q	(United States) C McHale	6	1	6
(United States) A Anisimova	4^{r}
Q	(Russia) V Flink	3
(Germany) L Siegemund	3	2
8	(United Kingdom) J Konta	6	6

Second round
1	(United States) S Stephens	3	3
Q	(Brazil) B Haddad Maia	6	6
(China) Y Wang	4
(Puerto Rico) M Puig	1^{r}
3	(Croatia) D Vekić	6	7
Q	(United States) C McHale	4	5
Q	(Russia) V Flink	4	1
8	(United Kingdom) J Konta	6	6

Quarterfinals
Q	(Brazil) B Haddad Maia	3	4
(China) Y Wang	6	6
3	(Croatia) D Vekić	6	7
8	(United Kingdom) J Konta	3	5

Semifinals
(China) Y Wang	2	6	6
3	(Croatia) D Vekić	6	3	1

=== Bottom half ===
First round
7	(China) S Zheng	3	7	6
WC	(Mexico) R Zarazúa	6	5	4
(Hungary) T Babos	5	6	6
(Slovenia) D Jakupović	7	4	4
WC	(Switzerland) J Teichmann	1	3
(Canada) B Andreescu	6	6
(Australia) D Gavrilova	4	2
4	(Romania) M Buzărnescu	6	6
5	(United States) S Kenin	4
(Sweden) R Peterson	3^{r}
(United Kingdom) K Boulter	6	7
Q	(Switzerland) C Perrin	4	5
(Germany) T Maria	6	7^{7}
LL	(Italy) M Trevisan	2	6^{1}
WC	(Belarus) V Azarenka	6	6
2	(United States) D Collins	1	2

Second round
7	(China) S Zheng	4	6	6
(Hungary) T Babos	6	4	3
(Canada) B Andreescu	6	7
4	(Romania) M Buzărnescu	2	5
5	(United States) S Kenin	6	4
(United Kingdom) K Boulter	4	1^{r}
(Germany) T Maria	2	1
WC	(Belarus) V Azarenka	6	6

Quarterfinals
7	(China) S Zheng	6^{3}	1
(Canada) B Andreescu	7^{7}	6
5	(United States) S Kenin	6	4	7
WC	(Belarus) V Azarenka	4	6	5

Semifinals
(Canada) B Andreescu	4	6	5
5	(United States) S Kenin	6	3	7

== Qualifying ==
=== Seeds ===
1. (Russia) Irina Khromacheva (first round)
2. (Belgium) Ysaline Bonaventure (qualified)
3. (United States) Christina McHale (qualified)
4. (Switzerland) Conny Perrin (qualified)
5. (Paraguay) Verónica Cepede Royg (first round)
6. (Russia) Sofya Zhuk (qualifying competition)
7. (Czech Republic) Tereza Martincová (qualifying competition)
8. (United States) Danielle Lao (first round)
9. (Australia) Kimberly Birrell (first round)
10. (Australia) Astra Sharma (first round)
11. (Liechtenstein) Kathinka von Deichmann (first round)
12. (Italy) Martina Trevisan (qualifying competition, lucky loser)

=== Qualifiers ===
1. (Brazil) Beatriz Haddad Maia
2. (Belgium) Ysaline Bonaventure
3. (United States) Christina McHale
4. (Switzerland) Conny Perrin
5. (Romania) Irina Bara
6. (Russia) Varvara Flink

=== Lucky loser ===
1. (Italy) Martina Trevisan

=== Draw ===
==== First qualifier ====
First round
1	(Russia) Irina Khromacheva	1	5
WC	(Mexico) Giuliana Olmos	6	7
(Brazil) Beatriz Haddad Maia	6	6
9	(Australia) Kimberly Birrell	1	1

Qualifying competition
WC	(Mexico) Giuliana Olmos	3	6	3
(Brazil) Beatriz Haddad Maia	6	3	6

==== Second qualifier ====
First round
2	(Belgium) Ysaline Bonaventure	6	7^{7}
(Ukraine) Katarina Zavatska	1	6^{2}
PR	(Argentina) Nadia Podoroska	2	2
12	(Italy) Martina Trevisan	6	6

Qualifying competition
2	(Belgium) Ysaline Bonaventure	7	3	6
12	(Italy) Martina Trevisan	5	6	3

==== Third qualifier ====
First round
3	(United States) Christina McHale	6	6
(United Kingdom) Katie Swan	0	3
WC	(Mexico) Ana Sofía Sánchez	6	7^{7}
11	(Liechtenstein) Kathinka von Deichmann	3	6^{5}

Qualifying competition
3	(United States) Christina McHale	6	7^{7}
WC	(Mexico) Ana Sofía Sánchez	3	6^{3}

==== Fourth qualifier ====
First round
4	(Switzerland) Conny Perrin	6	6
WC	(Mexico) María José Portillo Ramírez	1	1
WC	(Mexico) Victoria Rodríguez	4	6	6
8	(United States) Danielle Lao	6	3	4

Qualifying competition
4	(Switzerland) Conny Perrin	4	7^{10}	6
WC	(Mexico) Victoria Rodríguez	6	6^{8}	2

==== Fifth qualifier ====
First round
5	(Paraguay) Verónica Cepede Royg	6^{5}	2
(Romania) Irina Bara	7^{7}	6
(India) Karman Thandi	6^{5}	3
7	(Czech Republic) Tereza Martincová	7^{7}	6

Qualifying competition
(Romania) Irina Bara	3	6	7^{7}
7	(Czech Republic) Tereza Martincová	6	2	6^{5}

==== Sixth qualifier ====
First round
6	(Russia) Sofya Zhuk	6	6
(Hungary) Réka Luca Jani	0	3
(Russia) Varvara Flink	7	4	6
10	(Australia) Astra Sharma	5	6	3

Qualifying competition
6	(Russia) Sofya Zhuk	6	5	2
(Russia) Varvara Flink	4	7	6
