= 2019 Abierto Mexicano Telcel – Women's doubles =

Women's doubles
- 2019 Abierto Mexicano Telcel

Final
- Champions: (Belarus) Victoria Azarenka (China) Zheng Saisai
- Runners-up: (United States) Desirae Krawczyk (Mexico) Giuliana Olmos
- Score: 6–1, 6–2

Events
Singles	men	women
Doubles	men	women
← 2018 ·	Abierto Mexicano Telcel	· 2020 →

Tatjana Maria and Heather Watson were the defending champions, but only Maria chose to defend her title, partnering Christina McHale. The pair lost in the quarterfinals to Cornelia Lister and Renata Voráčová.

Victoria Azarenka and Zheng Saisai won the title, defeating Desirae Krawczyk and Giuliana Olmos in the final, 6–1, 6–2.

== Seeds ==
1. (Romania) Irina Bara / (Romania) Mihaela Buzărnescu (first round)
2. (Slovenia) Dalila Jakupović / (Russia) Irina Khromacheva (quarterfinals)
3. (United States) Desirae Krawczyk / (Mexico) Giuliana Olmos (final)
4. (Chile) Alexa Guarachi / (United States) Sabrina Santamaria (first round)

== Draw ==
=== Key ===
- Q = Qualifier
- WC = Wild card
- LL = Lucky loser
- Alt = Alternate
- SE = Special exempt
- PR = Protected ranking
- ITF = ITF entry
- JE = Junior exempt
- w/o = Walkover
- r = Retired
- d = Defaulted
- SR = Special ranking

=== Draw ===
First round
1	(Romania) I Bara (Romania) M Buzărnescu	6	2	[8]
(Germany) T Maria (United States) C McHale	2	6	[10]
(Sweden) C Lister (Czech Republic) R Voráčová	7	7
(Hungary) T Babos (Hungary) RL Jani	5	5
3	(United States) D Krawczyk (Mexico) G Olmos	6	6
(Belgium) Y Bonaventure (United States) K Christian	2	3
WC	(Czech Republic) M Bouzková (Mexico) R Zarazúa	4	2
(Brazil) L Pigossi (China) Y Wang	6	6
(Australia) D Gavrilova (Australia) A Sharma	4	1
(United Kingdom) J Konta (Germany) L Siegemund	6	6
(Belarus) V Azarenka (China) S Zheng	7^{7}	6
4	(Chile) A Guarachi (United States) S Santamaria	6^{3}	3
(Canada) S Fichman (United States) M Sanchez	6	6
WC	(Mexico) V Rodríguez (Mexico) AS Sánchez	1	4
(Poland) P Kania (Russia) Y Sizikova	5	3
2	(Slovenia) D Jakupović (Russia) I Khromacheva	7	6

Quarterfinals
(Germany) T Maria (United States) C McHale	4	4
(Sweden) C Lister (Czech Republic) R Voráčová	6	6
3	(United States) D Krawczyk (Mexico) G Olmos	6	6
(Brazil) L Pigossi (China) Y Wang	3	0
(United Kingdom) J Konta (Germany) L Siegemund	6	3	[6]
(Belarus) V Azarenka (China) S Zheng	3	6	[10]
(Canada) S Fichman (United States) M Sanchez	5	6	[11]
2	(Slovenia) D Jakupović (Russia) I Khromacheva	7	2	[9]

Semifinals
(Sweden) C Lister (Czech Republic) R Voráčová	5	6^{3}
3	(United States) D Krawczyk (Mexico) G Olmos	7	7^{7}
(Belarus) V Azarenka (China) S Zheng	6^{3}	6	[13]
(Canada) S Fichman (United States) M Sanchez	7^{7}	2	[11]

Final
3	(United States) D Krawczyk (Mexico) G Olmos	1	2
(Belarus) V Azarenka (China) S Zheng	6	6
