= 2019 Abierto Mexicano Telcel – Men's doubles =

Men's doubles
- 2019 Abierto Mexicano Telcel

Final
- Champions: (Germany) Alexander Zverev (Germany) Mischa Zverev
- Runners-up: (United States) Austin Krajicek (New Zealand) Artem Sitak
- Score: 2–6, 7–6^{(7–4)}, [10–5]

Events
Singles	men	women
Doubles	men	women
← 2018 ·	Abierto Mexicano Telcel	· 2020 →

Jamie Murray and Bruno Soares were the defending champions, but lost in the first round to Robert Lindstedt and Frances Tiafoe.

Mischa and Alexander Zverev won the title, defeating Artem Sitak and Austin Krajicek in the final, 2–6, 7–6^{(7–4)}, [10–5].

== Seeds ==
1. (United Kingdom) Jamie Murray / (Brazil) Bruno Soares (first round)
2. (United States) Bob Bryan / (United States) Mike Bryan (quarterfinals)
3. (Colombia) Juan Sebastián Cabal / (Colombia) Robert Farah (quarterfinals)
4. (Poland) Łukasz Kubot / (Brazil) Marcelo Melo (first round)

== Draw ==
=== Key ===
- Q = Qualifier
- WC = Wild card
- LL = Lucky loser
- Alt = Alternate
- ITF = ITF entry
- PR = Protected ranking
- SR = Special ranking
- SE = Special exempt
- JE = Junior exempt
- JR = Junior Accelerator Programme entrant
- CO = College Accelerator Programme entrant
- NG = Next Gen Accelerator Program entrant
- w/o = Walkover
- r = Retired
- d = Defaulted

=== Draw ===
First round
1	(United Kingdom) J Murray (Brazil) B Soares	2	6^{4}
(Sweden) R Lindstedt (United States) F Tiafoe	6	7^{7}
(Spain) M Granollers (Croatia) N Mektić	6	2	[10]
LL	(Mexico) H Hach Verdugo (Croatia) A Pavić	4	6	[5]
3	(Colombia) JS Cabal (Colombia) R Farah	7^{7}	6
(Chile) N Jarry (Italy) A Seppi	6^{2}	3
(United States) A Krajicek (New Zealand) A Sitak	6	6
Q	(Germany) P Gojowczyk (Germany) K Krawietz	2	2
(Spain) F López (Spain) M López	6	6
(New Zealand) M Daniell (Netherlands) W Koolhof	4	4
WC	(Mexico) S González (Pakistan) A-u-H Qureshi	7^{7}	6
4	(Poland) Ł Kubot (Brazil) M Melo	6^{4}	3
WC	(United States) N Monroe (Mexico) MÁ Reyes-Varela	3	5
(Germany) A Zverev (Germany) M Zverev	6	7
(Australia) J Millman (United Kingdom) N Skupski	3	4
2	(United States) B Bryan (United States) M Bryan	6	6

Quarterfinals
(Sweden) R Lindstedt (United States) F Tiafoe	4	4
(Spain) M Granollers (Croatia) N Mektić	6	6
3	(Colombia) JS Cabal (Colombia) R Farah	6^{5}	4
(United States) A Krajicek (New Zealand) A Sitak	7^{7}	6
(Spain) F López (Spain) M López	5	6	[12]
WC	(Mexico) S González (Pakistan) A-u-H Qureshi	7	4	[10]
(Germany) A Zverev (Germany) M Zverev	5	6	[10]
2	(United States) B Bryan (United States) M Bryan	7	4	[7]

Semifinals
(Spain) M Granollers (Croatia) N Mektić	3	6	[11]
(United States) A Krajicek (New Zealand) A Sitak	6	3	[13]
(Spain) F López (Spain) M López	6^{1}	4
(Germany) A Zverev (Germany) M Zverev	7^{7}	6

Final
(United States) A Krajicek (New Zealand) A Sitak	6	6^{4}	[5]
(Germany) A Zverev (Germany) M Zverev	2	7^{7}	[10]

== Qualifying ==
=== Seeds ===
1. (United States) Taylor Fritz / (United States) Ryan Harrison (withdrew)
2. (Switzerland) Luca Margaroli / (Italy) Andrea Vavassori (withdrew)

=== Qualifiers ===
1. (Germany) Peter Gojowczyk / (Germany) Kevin Krawietz

=== Qualifying draw ===
First round
Alt	(Dominican Republic) Víctor Estrella Burgos (Italy) Federico Gaio	4	3
(Germany) Peter Gojowczyk (Germany) Kevin Krawietz	6	6
WC	(Mexico) Hans Hach Verdugo (Croatia) Ante Pavić	6	6
Alt	(Peru) Sergio Galdós (Bolivia) Federico Zeballos	3	4

Qualifying competition
(Germany) Peter Gojowczyk (Germany) Kevin Krawietz	7	6
WC	(Mexico) Hans Hach Verdugo (Croatia) Ante Pavić	5	4
