= Mischa Zverev =

Russian-German tennis player (born 1987)

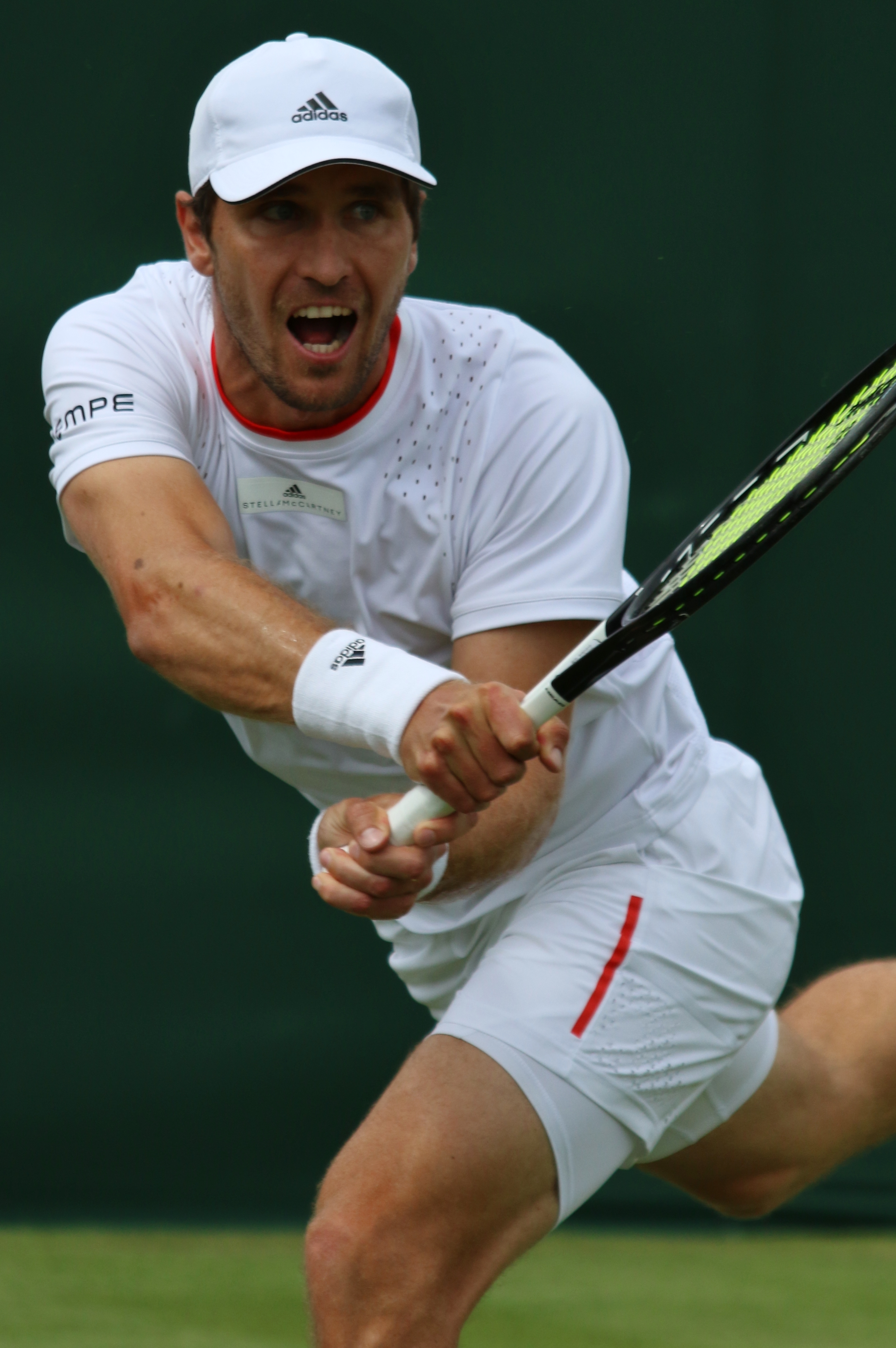
- Zverev at the 2019 Wimbledon Championships
- Country (sports): Germany
- Residence: Monte Carlo, Monaco
- Born: 22 August 1987 (age 39) Moscow, Russian SFSR, Soviet Union
- Height: 1.91 m (6 ft 3 in)
- Turned pro: 2005
- Retired: 2023
- Plays: Left-handed (two-handed backhand)
- Coach: Alexander Zverev Sr. Arturs Kazijevs; Mikhail Ledovskikh
- Prize money: US$5,739,081

Singles
- Career record: 133–199
- Career titles: 1
- Highest ranking: No. 25 (24 July 2017)

Grand Slam singles results
- Australian Open: QF (2017)
- French Open: 3R (2018)
- Wimbledon: 3R (2008, 2017)
- US Open: 4R (2017)

Doubles
- Career record: 85–121
- Career titles: 4
- Highest ranking: No. 44 (8 June 2009)

Grand Slam doubles results
- Australian Open: 2R (2017)
- French Open: 2R (2009, 2017)
- Wimbledon: 2R (2019)
- US Open: 2R (2008, 2009)

Team competitions
- Davis Cup: QF (2009)
- Last updated on: 16 May 2024.

Mikhail "Mischa" Alexandrovich Zverev (Note: German: [ˈmɪka.ɪl ˈmɪʃa ˈtsfɛʁɛf]; Russian: Михаил "Миша" Александрович Зверев, romanized: Mikhail "Misha" Aleksandrovich Zverev, IPA: [mʲɪxɐˈil ˈmʲiʂə ɐlʲɪkˈsandrəvʲɪdʑ ˈzvʲerʲɪf].) (born 22 August 1987) is a German former professional tennis player. He achieved a career-high singles ranking of world No. 25 on 24 July 2017.

At the 2017 Australian Open, Zverev defeated world No. 1 Andy Murray in four sets before losing in the quarterfinals to eventual champion Roger Federer. As a qualifier, he has also reached the quarterfinals of both the 2009 Italian Open and the 2016 Shanghai Masters. He is the brother of current world No. 1, 2021 Olympic gold medallist, two-time ATP Finals champion and current French Open champion Alexander Zverev.

== Personal life ==
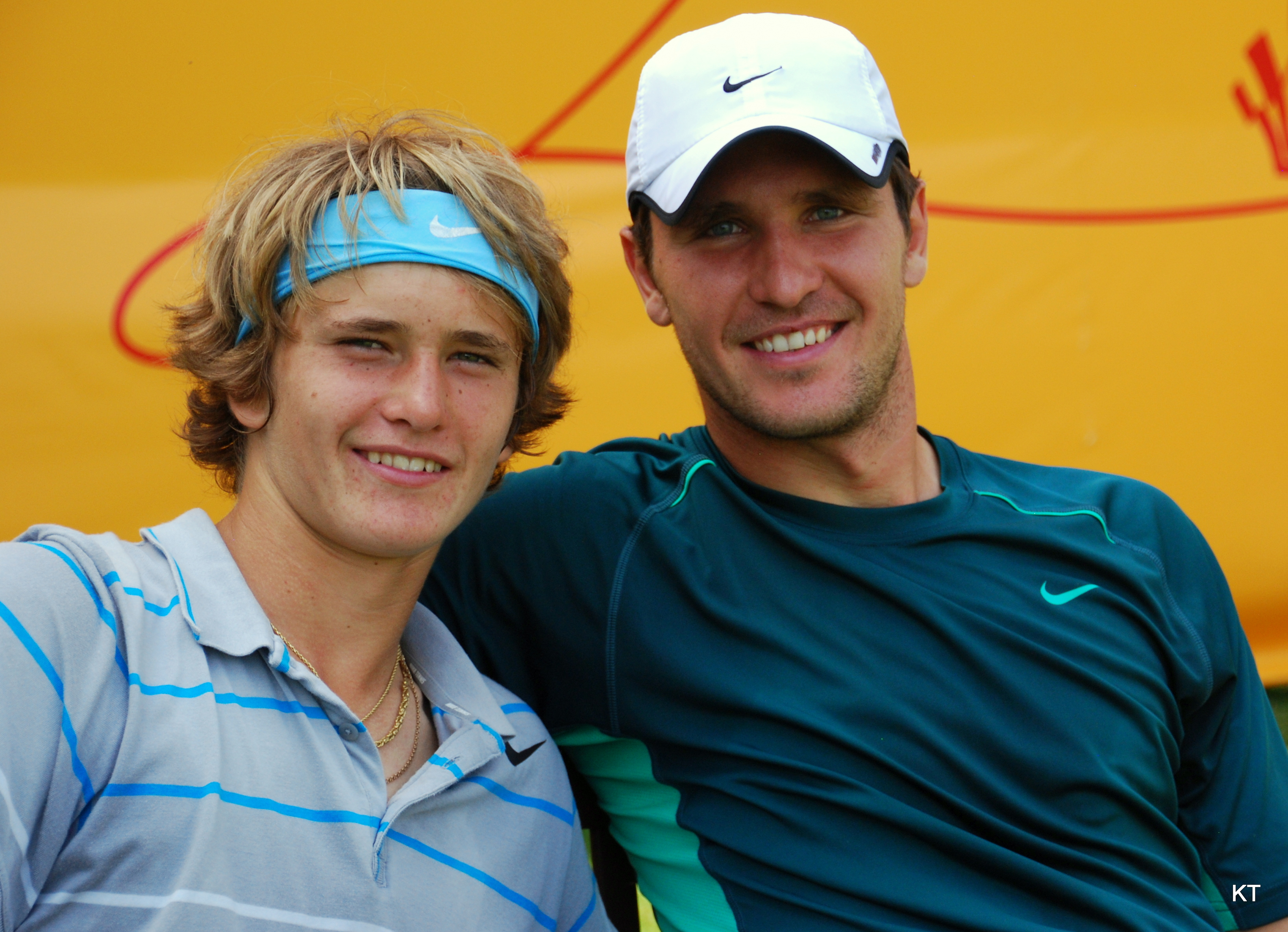
Sascha & Mischa Zverev

Zverev was born in Moscow, USSR but grew up in Hamburg, Germany when his parents emigrated there in 1991. He is the son of former Russian tennis player Alexander Zverev Sr., who is also his coach. Internationally, he represents Germany and resides in Monte Carlo, Monaco. His younger brother, Alexander Zverev, also plays on the tour.

== Juniors ==
Zverev had a very successful junior career, attaining a No. 3 combined world ranking and making the semifinals of the US Open (losing to Andy Murray), as well as the quarterfinals of Roland Garros (losing to Alex Kuznetsov) and the Australian Open (losing to Novak Djokovic) in 2004. In doubles he reached the final of the French Open in the same year.

As a junior, then known as Mihail Zverev, he compiled a 123–50 win–loss record in singles (and 79–33 in doubles).

== Professional career ==
=== 2006 ===
In October 2006, he made his first quarterfinal at ATP level in Bangkok, Thailand, beating former world No. 1 Juan Carlos Ferrero and former world No. 5 Rainer Schüttler before losing to Marat Safin, also a former world No. 1.

=== 2007: Cracking the top 100 ===
He spent all of 2007 inside the top 200 and, in July, made a second quarterfinal in Rhode Island. He then won a Challenger title in August at a tournament held in Istanbul and followed that up with another quarterfinal run at the Bronx Challenger, which saw him crack the top 100 for the first time in his career.

=== 2008: First doubles title ===
At the 2008 Australian Open, Zverev nearly upset 11th seed Tommy Robredo in the first round. He took the first two sets but went down in five. In June 2008, Zverev managed to secure his first ATP title victory by winning the doubles together with his partner Mikhail Youzhny at the Gerry Weber Open in Halle, Germany.

At the 2008 Wimbledon Championships, Zverev surprisingly reached the third round after wins over Alexander Peya and Juan Carlos Ferrero, but was then forced to retire in his third round match against Stan Wawrinka due to pain in his left thigh.

=== 2009: Italian Open quarterfinal ===
In May, he reached the quarterfinals of the Italian Open, losing to world No. 2 Roger Federer in straight sets. He later helped Germany reach the final of the ARAG World Team Cup with teammates Nicolas Kiefer, Rainer Schüttler and Philipp Kohlschreiber. At the 2009 Wimbledon Championships, Zverev beat 25th seed Dmitry Tursunov in straight sets. He faced Philipp Petzschner in the second round and lost in five sets. He was nominated by Davis Cup captain Patrik Kühnen for the quarterfinal against Spain in Marbella. He lost his doubles match with Nicolas Kiefer to Feliciano López and Fernando Verdasco in four sets.

=== 2010: First ATP final ===
Zverev began his comeback at the Brisbane International in January after a right wrist fracture. However, he lost to Australian wildcard Carsten Ball in straight sets. He made his next appearance at the Medibank International in Sydney where he lost in the first round of qualifying. At the 2010 Australian Open, he lost to Łukasz Kubot from Poland in straight sets.

Zverev regained his form at the European indoor tournaments. In Marseille he reached the semifinal, defeating world No. 17 Tommy Robredo along the way. He lost to eventual champion Michaël Llodra. His good form carried on – he went on to win after saving a match point in his first round match in Delray Beach against Michael Russell before falling to Mardy Fish in two sets. He lost his opening match in Indian Wells. At the 2010 Sony Ericsson Open in Miami, Zverev was knocked out in the first round of qualifying. He would not win a main draw match in a tournament for the next seven weeks. In preparation for Wimbledon he accepted a Wildcard into the 2010 Gerry Weber Open where he defeated Florent Serra and Jürgen Melzer before falling to Benjamin Becker. Again, Zverev seemed to have found some form, but he was defeated by Andre Begemann in the first round of qualifying at Wimbledon. Zverev then decided to enter more ATP Challenger Tour events and reached the quarterfinals of the Oberstaufen Challenger. Despite being granted a wildcard into both Stuttgart and Hamburg, he could not manage to win more than one match.

At the 2010 US Open, Zverev was defeated in the first round of qualifying again. He then returned to Europe playing a clay court ATP Challenger Tour Event in Genoa. He reached the quarter-finals where he was defeated by eventual champion Fabio Fognini. Two weeks later he managed to qualify for the Open de Moselle in Metz. Zverev reached his maiden ATP World Tour singles final after victories over Horacio Zeballos, Nicolas Mahut, Jarkko Nieminen and the retirement of Richard Gasquet in the semifinals. In the final Zverev played Gilles Simon to whom he lost in two sets. He qualified for the main draw of the ATP World Tour Masters 1000 tournament in Shanghai. In the main draw he lost to Juan Mónaco in the third round after beating Sergiy Stakhovsky and Nikolay Davydenko in the respective first and second rounds. At the end of October he again qualified for an ATP tournament, this time at Montpellier. He defeated Robin Haase in the first round before falling to Nikolay Davydenko in the second round. He finished the year at No. 82, having made $318,805 in prize money in addition to a compiling a singles match record of 13–18.

=== 2011 ===
Zverev had a slow start to 2011, losing four matches in a row before capturing his first win of the season in Indian Wells, where he made the second round after defeating Matthew Ebden. He then lost another four matches in a row again, prior to his victory over Dudi Sela in the first round at the Serbia Open.

=== 2012–2015 ===
Zverev played mainly in tournaments either on the ATP Challenger Tour or the ITF Men's Circuit during this time.

=== 2016: Shanghai Masters quarterfinal ===
In April 2016, Zverev won his first ATP Challenger singles title in over eight years at the Sarasota Open.

At the 2016 Shanghai Masters, the German defeated world No. 14 Nick Kyrgios in the second round. He then beat Marcel Granollers before losing a close match to world No. 1 Novak Djokovic in the quarterfinals.

Zverev got to the semifinals at the Swiss Indoors tournament in Basel after beating world No. 3 Stan Wawrinka.

=== 2017: First Grand Slam quarterfinal, first seeding at a Grand Slam & cracking the top 30 ===
Zverev started his 2017 season at the Brisbane International with a loss to Rafael Nadal in the second round, winning only two games. However, at the 2017 Australian Open, Zverev was able to reach the quarterfinals after defeating world No. 1 Andy Murray in the fourth round, marking the biggest accomplishment of his career to date. Zverev ultimately ended up losing to the eventual champion and 17th seed, Roger Federer in straight sets, ending his remarkable run. In Indian Wells he was the 29th seed, marking the first time he has been seeded in a Masters tournament and thus meaning he would get a bye into the second round. In the second round he faced former world No. 28 João Sousa and defeated him in straight sets, then faced 8th seed Dominic Thiem against whom he lost to in straight sets. At the 2017 Miami Open he was the 28th seed, again receiving a bye into the second round, but he lost to qualifier Jared Donaldson. Zverev made his 2nd ATP level final at the Geneva Open losing in 3 sets to Stan Wawrinka. He was seeded for the first time at a Grand Slam in Paris as the 32nd seed, but lost in the first round to the unseeded Stefano Napolitano. At the 2017 MercedesCup the home crowd saw him reach the semifinals, where he lost a close three setter to Feliciano López. Then at the 2017 Gerry Weber Open he won against Lukáš Lacko in straight sets, before losing in two close sets to eight time Halle champion Roger Federer. In Halle doubles action he would make his second final of the year, partnering his younger brother Alexander. At the 2017 Wimbledon Championships as the 27th seed Zverev reached the third round after beating Bernard Tomic and Mikhail Kukushkin. By virtue of his Wimbledon showing, Mischa would move up to a career-best world No. 25 in the ATP rankings. As the 23rd seed, he made the fourth round at the next Grand Slam, the US Open. Zverev would go on to finish the year ranked No. 33, improving 18 spots from his previous best finish in 2016.

=== 2018: First ATP title ===
After pulling out of the first round of the Australian Open while trailing Hyeon Chung 6–2, 4–1, Zverev was fined a record $45,000 for an 'unprofessional first round performance', becoming the first player to be fined under the new rule. The fine represented nearly all of the prize money Zverev would have received for losing in the first round.

Zverev won his first career ATP title at the 2018 Eastbourne International, defeating Nicolás Jarry, seventh seed Steve Johnson, third seed Denis Shapovalov, Mikhail Kukushkin, and Lukáš Lacko.

=== Hiatus, Eurosport commentator ===
Although Zverev never officially announced his retirement, he has not played on the ATP Tour or ITF Tour since February 2023. Meanwhile, he also served as an expert and a commentator for tennis matches on Eurosport and other sports channels.

== Performance timelines ==
Key
W	F	SF	QF	#R	RR	Q#	P#	DNQ	A	Z#	PO	G	S	B	NMS	NTI	P	NH

(W) winner; (F) finalist; (SF) semifinalist; (QF) quarterfinalist; (#R) rounds 4, 3, 2, 1; (RR) round-robin stage; (Q#) qualification round; (P#) preliminary round; (DNQ) did not qualify; (A) absent; (Z#) Davis/Fed Cup Zonal Group (with number indication) or (PO) play-off; (G) gold, (S) silver or (B) bronze Olympic/Paralympic medal; (NMS) not a Masters tournament; (NTI) not a Tier I tournament; (P) postponed; (NH) not held; (SR) strike rate (events won / competed); (W–L) win–loss record.
To avoid confusion and double counting, these charts are updated at the conclusion of a tournament or when the player's participation has ended.

=== Singles ===
Tournament	2004	2005	2006	2007	2008	2009	2010	2011	2012	2013	2014	2015	2016	2017	2018	2019	2020	2021	2022	2023	SR	W–L	Win%
Grand Slam tournaments
Australian Open	A	A	A	2R	1R	1R	1R	1R	A	Q2	Q2	A	Q3	QF	1R	1R	A	Q1	A	A	0 / 8	5–8	38%
French Open	A	A	A	Q1	1R	1R	1R	1R	1R	Q1	Q1	A	Q1	1R	3R	1R	A	A	A	A	0 / 8	2–8	20%
Wimbledon	A	A	A	1R	3R	2R	Q1	1R	Q1	Q2	A	A	Q1	3R	1R	1R	NH	A	A	A	0 / 7	5–7	42%
US Open	A	A	Q1	Q1	1R	1R	Q1	Q1	Q2	Q2	A	A	2R	4R	1R	Q2	A	A	A	A	0 / 5	4–5	44%
Win–loss	0–0	0–0	0–0	1–2	2–4	1–4	0–2	0–3	0–1	0–0	0–0	0–0	1–1	9–4	2–4	0–3	0–0	0–0	0–0	0–0	0 / 28	16–28	36%
ATP Tour Masters 1000
Indian Wells Open	A	A	A	A	Q1	1R	1R	2R	Q1	2R	Q1	1R	Q2	3R	2R	1R	NH	A	A	A	0 / 8	4–8	33%
Miami Open	A	A	A	Q1	Q1	1R	Q1	1R	A	Q1	A	A	Q2	2R	1R	2R	NH	1R	A	A	0 / 6	1–6	14%
Monte-Carlo Masters	A	A	A	A	Q1	Q1	Q2	Q1	A	A	A	A	A	1R	3R	Q1	NH	Q1	A	A	0 / 2	2–2	50%
Madrid Open	A	A	A	A	A	Q1	A	A	A	A	A	A	A	1R	1R	Q1	NH	A	A	A	0 / 2	0–2	0%
Italian Open	A	A	A	A	Q2	QF	Q1	A	A	A	A	A	A	1R	Q2	A	A	A	A	A	0 / 2	3–2	60%
Canadian Open	A	A	A	A	A	1R	A	A	A	A	A	A	Q2	2R	A	A	NH	A	A	A	0 / 2	1–2	33%
Cincinnati Open	A	A	A	A	A	1R	A	A	A	A	A	A	1R	2R	2R	A	A	A	A	A	0 / 4	2–4	33%
Shanghai Masters	not held					1R	3R	Q2	A	Q1	A	A	QF	1R	1R	A	not held			A	0 / 5	5–5	50%
Paris Masters	A	A	A	A	A	A	Q1	A	A	A	A	A	1R	1R	A	A	A	A	A	A	0 / 2	0–2	0%
German Open	Q1	Q1	Q2	Q1	1R	not Masters series															0 / 1	0–1	0%
Win–loss	0–0	0–0	0–0	0–0	0–1	3–6	2–2	1–2	0–0	1–1	0–0	0–1	3–3	3–9	4–6	1–2	0–0	0–1	0–0	0–0	0 / 34	18–34	35%
National representation
Davis Cup	A	A	A	A	A	QF	A	A	A	A	A	A	A	1R	A	A	A	A	A	A	0 / 2	0–1	0%
Career statistics
	2004	2005	2006	2007	2008	2009	2010	2011	2012	2013	2014	2015	2016	2017	2018	2019	2020	2021	2022	2023	Career		
Tournaments	0	0	3	8	23	24	18	18	3	5	0	8	14	31	30	12	2	1	0	0	200		
Titles	0	0	0	0	0	0	0	0	0	0	0	0	0	0	1	0	0	0	0	0	1		
Finals	0	0	0	0	0	0	1	0	0	0	0	0	0	1	1	0	0	0	0	0	3		
Hard win–loss	0–0	0–0	2–1	3–4	12–11	6–14	10–11	1–8	0–1	2–4	0–0	4–5	11–10	18–20	7–18	1–4	1–2	0–1	0–0	0–0	0 / 114	78–114	41%
Clay win–loss	0–0	0–0	0–0	1–1	3–8	6–7	1–6	1–6	0–1	0–0	0–0	1–1	1–4	5–8	6–7	0–5	0–0	0–0	0–0	0–0	0 / 54	25–54	32%
Grass win–loss	0–0	0–0	1–1	2–3	3–3	3–3	2–1	0–4	0–1	2–1	0–0	2–2	0–0	7–4	6–4	2–3	0–0	0–0	0–0	0–0	1 / 31	30–30	50%
Carpet win–loss	0–0	0–0	0–1	0–0	0–0	discontinued															0 / 1	0–1	0%
Overall win–loss	0–0	0–0	3–3	6–8	18–22	15–24	13–18	2–18	0–3	4–5	0–0	7–8	12–14	30–32	19–29	3–12	1–2	0–1	0–0	0–0	1 / 200	133–199	40%
Win %	–	–	50%	43%	45%	38%	42%	10%	0%	44%	–	47%	46%	48%	39%	20%	33%	0%	–	–	40%		
Year-end ranking	621	595	151	88	80	78	82	211	159	176	726	171	51	33	69	281	264	346	1517	1369			

=== Doubles ===
Tournament	2004	2005	2006	2007	2008	2009	2010	2011	2012	2013	2014	2015	2016	2017	2018	2019	2020	2021	2022	SR	W–L
Grand Slam tournaments
Australian Open	A	A	A	A	1R	1R	1R	1R	A	A	A	A	A	2R	1R	1R	A	A	A	0 / 7	1–7
French Open	A	A	A	A	1R	2R	A	A	A	A	A	A	A	2R	1R	1R	A	A	A	0 / 5	2–5
Wimbledon	A	A	A	1R	A	1R	1R	A	A	A	A	A	A	1R	1R	2R	NH	A	A	0 / 6	1–6
US Open	A	A	A	A	2R	2R	A	A	A	A	A	A	A	1R	1R	1R	A	A	A	0 / 5	2–5
Win–loss	0–0	0–0	0–0	0–1	1–3	2–4	0–2	0–1	0–0	0–0	0–0	0–0	0–0	2–4	0–4	1–4	0–0	0–0	0–0	0 / 23	6–23
ATP Tour Masters 1000
Indian Wells Open	A	A	A	A	A	1R	A	A	A	A	A	A	A	2R	1R	1R	NH	A	A	0 / 4	1–4
Miami Open	A	A	A	A	A	A	A	A	A	A	A	A	A	2R	2R	1R	NH	A	A	0 / 3	2–3
Monte-Carlo Masters	A	A	A	A	A	A	A	A	A	A	A	A	A	2R	2R	2R	NH	A	A	0 / 3	3–3
Madrid Open	A	A	A	A	A	A	A	A	A	A	A	A	A	A	1R	1R	NH	A	A	0 / 2	0–2
Italian Open	A	A	A	A	A	A	A	A	A	A	A	A	A	2R	1R	1R	A	A	A	0 / 2	1–1
Canadian Open	A	A	A	A	A	A	A	A	A	A	A	A	A	A	A	A	NH	A	A	0 / 0	0–0
Cincinnati Open	A	A	A	A	A	A	A	A	A	A	A	A	A	2R	A	A	A	A	A	0 / 1	1–1
Shanghai Masters	not held					A	A	A	A	A	A	A	A	1R	A	A	not held			0 / 1	0–1
Paris Masters	A	A	A	A	A	A	A	A	A	A	A	A	A	1R	A	A	A	A	A	0 / 1	0–1
Win–loss	0–0	0–0	0–0	0–0	0–0	0–1	0–0	0–0	0–0	0–0	0–0	0–0	0–0	5–6	2–5	1–5	0–0	0–0	0–0	0 / 18	8–17
National representation
Davis Cup	A	A	A	A	A	QF	A	A	A	A	A	A	A	1R	A	A	A	A	A	0 / 2	0–2
Career statistics
	2004	2005	2006	2007	2008	2009	2010	2011	2012	2013	2014	2015	2016	2017	2018	2019	2020	2021	2022	Career	
Tournaments	1	0	0	5	14	16	6	8	1	1	0	4	4	25	23	14	3	2	0	127	
Titles	0	0	0	0	2	0	0	0	0	0	0	0	0	1	0	1	0	0	0	4	
Finals	0	0	0	0	3	2	0	0	0	0	0	1	1	2	2	1	0	0	0	12	
Overall win–loss	0–1	0–0	0–0	0–5	16–12	18–16	1–6	3–8	0–1	0–1	0–0	3–4	5–4	17–23	12–22	8–13	2–3	0–2	0–0	85–121	
Win %	0%	–	–	0%	57%	53%	14%	27%	0%	0%	–	43%	56%	43%	35%	38%	40%	0%	–	41%	
Year-end ranking	842	696	169	125	66	87	354	302	197	273	1156	344	250	52	91	112	197	309	–		

== ATP career finals ==
=== Singles: 3 (1 title, 2 runner-ups) ===
Legend Grand Slam tournaments (0–0) ATP Finals (0–0) ATP Tour Masters 1000 (0–0) ATP Tour 500 Series (0–0) ATP Tour 250 Series (1–2)	Finals by surface Hard (0–1) Clay (0–1) Grass (1–0)	Finals by setting Outdoor (1–1) Indoor (0–1)

Result	W–L	Date	Tournament	Tier	Surface	Opponent	Score
Loss	0–1	Sep 2010	Moselle Open, France	250 Series	Hard (i)	(France) Gilles Simon	3–6, 2–6
Loss	0–2	May 2017	Geneva Open, Switzerland	250 Series	Clay	(Switzerland) Stan Wawrinka	6–4, 3–6, 3–6
Win	1–2	Jun 2018	Eastbourne International, United Kingdom	250 Series	Grass	(Slovakia) Lukáš Lacko	6–4, 6–4

=== Doubles: 12 (4 titles, 8 runner-ups) ===
Legend Grand Slam tournaments (0–0) ATP Finals (0–0) ATP Tour Masters 1000 (0–0) ATP International Series Gold / ATP Tour 500 Series (2–4) ATP International Series / ATP Tour 250 Series (2–4)	Finals by surface Hard (3–4) Clay (0–2) Grass (1–2)	Finals by setting Outdoor (3–5) Indoor (1–3)

Result	W–L	Date	Tournament	Tier	Surface	Partner	Opponents	Score
Win	1–0	Jun 2008	Halle Open, Germany	International	Grass	(Russia) Mikhail Youzhny	(Czech Republic) Lukáš Dlouhý (India) Leander Paes	3–6, 6–4, [10–3]
Loss	1–1	Jul 2008	Stuttgart Open, Germany	Intl. Gold	Clay	(Germany) Michael Berrer	(Germany) Philipp Kohlschreiber (Germany) Christopher Kas	3–6, 4–6
Win	2–1	Oct 2008	Japan Open, Japan	Intl. Gold	Hard	(Russia) Mikhail Youzhny	(Czech Republic) Lukáš Dlouhý (India) Leander Paes	6–3, 6–4
Loss	2–2	Jan 2009	Brisbane International, Australia	250 Series	Hard	(Spain) Fernando Verdasco	(France) Marc Gicquel (France) Jo-Wilfried Tsonga	4–6, 3–6
Loss	2–3	Oct 2009	Thailand Open, Thailand	250 Series	Hard (i)	(Spain) Guillermo García López	(United States) Eric Butorac (United States) Rajeev Ram	6–7^{(4–7)}, 3–6
Loss	2–4	May 2015	Bavarian Championships, Germany	250 Series	Clay	(Germany) Alexander Zverev	(Austria) Alexander Peya (Brazil) Bruno Soares	6–4, 1–6, [5–10]
Loss	2–5	Feb 2016	Open Sud de France, France	250 Series	Hard (i)	(Germany) Alexander Zverev	(Croatia) Mate Pavić (New Zealand) Michael Venus	5–7, 6–7^{(4–7)}
Win	3–5	Feb 2017	Open Sud de France, France	250 Series	Hard (i)	(Germany) Alexander Zverev	(France) Fabrice Martin (Canada) Daniel Nestor	6–4, 6–7^{(3–7)}, [10–7]
Loss	3–6	Jun 2017	Halle Open, Germany	500 Series	Grass	(Germany) Alexander Zverev	(Poland) Łukasz Kubot (Brazil) Marcelo Melo	7–5, 3–6, [8–10]
Loss	3–7	Jun 2018	Halle Open, Germany	500 Series	Grass	(Germany) Alexander Zverev	(Poland) Łukasz Kubot (Brazil) Marcelo Melo	6–7^{(1–7)}, 4–6
Loss	3–8	Oct 2018	Swiss Indoors, Switzerland	500 Series	Hard (i)	(Germany) Alexander Zverev	(United Kingdom) Dominic Inglot (Croatia) Franko Škugor	2–6, 5–7
Win	4–8	Mar 2019	Mexican Open, Mexico	500 Series	Hard	(Germany) Alexander Zverev	(United States) Austin Krajicek (New Zealand) Artem Sitak	2–6, 7–6^{(7–4)}, [10–5]

=== Team competition: 1 (1 runner-up) ===
Result	W–L	Year	Tournament	Surface	Partners	Opponents	Score
Loss	0–1	2009	World Team Cup, Germany	Clay	(Germany) Nicolas Kiefer (Germany) Philipp Kohlschreiber (Germany) Rainer Schüttler	(Serbia) Janko Tipsarević (Serbia) Viktor Troicki (Serbia) Nenad Zimonjić	1–2

== ATP Challenger finals ==
=== Singles: 11 (5–6) ===
Result	W–L	Date	Tournament	Surface	Opponent	Score
Win	1–0	Jul 2006	Dublin, Ireland	Carpet	(Denmark) Kristian Pless	7–5, 7–6^{(8–6)}
Loss	1–1	Nov 2006	Shrewsbury, United Kingdom	Hard (i)	(United Kingdom) Alex Bogdanovic	6–4, 4–6, 4–6
Win	2–1	Jun 2007	Karlsruhe, Germany	Clay	(United States) Wayne Odesnik	2–6, 6–4, 6–3
Win	3–1	Aug 2007	Istanbul, Turkey	Hard	(Slovakia) Lukáš Lacko	6–4, 6–4
Win	4–1	Nov 2007	Dnipropetrovsk, Ukraine	Hard (i)	(Russia) Dmitry Tursunov	6–4, 6–4
Loss	4–2	Nov 2011	Geneva, Switzerland	Hard (i)	(Tunisia) Malek Jaziri	6–4, 3–6, 3–6
Loss	4–3	Apr 2012	Le Gosier, Guadeloupe	Hard	(Belgium) David Goffin	2–6, 2–6
Loss	4–4	Oct 2012	Sacramento, United States	Hard	(United States) James Blake	1–6, 6–1, 4–6
Loss	4–5	Oct 2012	Tiburon, United States	Hard	(United States) Jack Sock	1–6, 6–1, 6–7^{(3–7)}
Loss	4–6	Jan 2013	Maui, United States	Hard	(Japan) Go Soeda	5–7, 5–7
Win	5–6	Apr 2016	Sarasota, United States	Clay	(Austria) Gerald Melzer	6–4, 7–6^{(7–2)}

=== Doubles: 13 (6–7) ===
Result	W–L	Date	Tournament	Surface	Partner	Opponents	Score
Loss	0–1	Dec 2005	Orlando, United States	Hard	(United States) Alex Kuznetsov	(Australia) Ashley Fisher (United States) Tripp Phillips	0–6, 3–2, def.
Win	1–1	Jul 2006	Oberstaufen, Germany	Clay	(Latvia) Ernests Gulbis	(Romania) Teodor-Dacian Crăciun (Romania) Gabriel Moraru	6–1, 6–1
Loss	1–2	Sep 2006	Freudenstadt, Germany	Clay	(France) Alexandre Sidorenko	(Germany) Tomas Behrend (Germany) Dominik Meffert	5–7, 6–7^{(5–7)}
Win	2–2	Nov 2006	Aachen, Germany	Carpet (i)	(Latvia) Ernests Gulbis	(Poland) Tomasz Bednarek (Georgia (country)) Irakli Labadze	6–7^{(5–7)}, 6–4, [10–8]
Loss	2–3	Nov 2006	Shrewsbury, United Kingdom	Hard (i)	(Germany) Lars Burgsmüller	(Germany) Philipp Marx (Denmark) Frederik Nielsen	4–6, 4–6
Win	3–3	Jun 2007	Karlsruhe, Germany	Clay	(United States) Alex Kuznetsov	(Germany) Michael Berrer (Portugal) Frederico Gil	6–4, 6–7^{(6–8)}, [10–4]
Win	4–3	Jun 2007	Surbiton, United Kingdom	Grass	(United States) Alex Kuznetsov	(United Kingdom) James Auckland (Australia) Stephen Huss	2–6, 6–3, [10–6]
Loss	4–4	Jul 2007	Dublin, Ireland	Carpet	(Germany) Lars Burgsmüller	(India) Rohan Bopanna (Australia) Adam Feeney	2–6, 2–6
Loss	4–5	Nov 2007	Aachen, Germany	Carpet (i)	(Germany) Dominik Meffert	(Germany) Philipp Petzschner (Austria) Alexander Peya	3–6, 2–6
Loss	4–6	Nov 2007	Bratislava, Slovakia	Hard (i)	(South Africa) Chris Haggard	(Czech Republic) Tomáš Cibulec (Czech Republic) Jaroslav Levinský	4–6, 6–2, [8–10]
Loss	4–7	Jul 2012	Marburg, Germany	Clay	(Russia) Denis Matsukevich	(Poland) Mateusz Kowalczyk (Czech Republic) David Škoch	2–6, 1–6
Win	5–7	Nov 2012	Knoxville, United States	Hard (i)	(United States) Alex Kuznetsov	(South Africa) Jean Andersen (South Africa) Izak van der Merwe	6–4, 6–2
Win	6–7	Feb 2013	Dallas, United States	Hard (i)	(United States) Alex Kuznetsov	(United States) Tennys Sandgren (United States) Rhyne Williams	6–4, 6–7^{(4–7)}, [10–5]

== ITF Futures finals ==
=== Singles: 5 (5–0) ===
Result	W–L	Date	Tournament	Surface	Opponent	Score
Win	1–0	Feb 2006	Mettmann, Germany	Carpet (i)	(Germany) Philipp Petzschner	3–6, 6–3, 6–4
Win	2–0	Feb 2006	Zagreb, Croatia	Hard (i)	(Croatia) Marin Čilić	7–6^{(7–5)}, 3–6, 7–6^{(9–7)}
Win	3–0	Jul 2006	Munakata, Japan	Hard	(Japan) Gouichi Motomura	6–3, 7–6^{(7–5)}
Win	4–0	Jul 2006	Dublin, Ireland	Carpet	(Australia) Paul Baccanello	6–4, 7–6^{(7–3)}
Win	5–0	Oct 2012	Mansfield, United States	Hard	(United States) Alex Kuznetsov	3–6, 6–0, 6–3

=== Doubles: 12 (5–7) ===
Result	W–L	Date	Tournament	Surface	Partner	Opponents	Score
Win	1–0	Jan 2005	Tampa, United States	Hard	(United States) Alex Kuznetsov	(United States) Goran Dragicevic (United States) Michael Yani	6–4, 7–5
Win	2–0	Jan 2005	Kissimmee, United States	Hard	(United States) Alex Kuznetsov	(Australia) David McNamara (Canada) Frédéric Niemeyer	6–7^{(5–7)}, 6–3, 7–6^{(8–6)}
Loss	2–1	Jun 2005	Vierumäki, Finland	Clay	(Germany) Benedikt Dorsch	(Estonia) Mait Künnap (Finland) Janne Ojala	3–6, 3–6
Loss	2–2	Jul 2005	Telfs, Austria	Clay	(Germany) Benedikt Dorsch	(Germany) Bastian Knittel (Germany) Christopher Koderisch	1–2, ret.
Win	3–2	Jan 2006	Oberentfelden, Germany	Hard (i)	(Sweden) Ervin Eleskovic	(Germany) David Klier (Germany) Torsten Popp	5–7, 6–3, 6–4
Loss	3–3	Feb 2006	Zagreb, Croatia	Hard (i)	(Germany) Tobias Klein	(France) Jean-François Bachelot (France) Nicolas Tourte	6–7^{(7–9)}, 6–7^{(3–7)}
Loss	3–4	Apr 2006	Dubai, United Arab Emirates	Hard	(Serbia) Viktor Troicki	(Switzerland) Marco Chiudinelli (Germany) Philipp Petzschner	5–7, 2–6
Win	4–4	Apr 2006	Dubai, United Arab Emirates	Hard	(Serbia) Viktor Troicki	(Russia) Vadim Davletshin (Russia) Alexandre Krasnoroutskiy	6–3, 6–2
Loss	4–5	May 2006	Munakata, Japan	Hard	(Poland) Michał Przysiężny	(United States) Troy Hahn (United States) Michael Yani	5–7, 5–7
Win	5–5	Jun 2006	Munakata, Japan	Hard	(Japan) Hiroyasu Sato	(Japan) Hiroki Kondo (Japan) Takahiro Terachi	walkover
Loss	5–6	Jul 2006	Dublin, Ireland	Carpet	(Latvia) Andis Juška	(France) Jean-François Bachelot (France) Nicolas Tourte	6–7^{(4–7)}, 1–6
Loss	5–7	Oct 2012	Mansfield, United States	Hard	(United States) Alex Kuznetsov	(United States) Vahid Mirzadeh (United States) Ryan Rowe	2–6, 7–6^{(7–5)}, [7–10]

== Record against top-10 players ==
Zverev's match record against players who have been ranked in the Top 10, with those who are active in boldface. Includes only ATP Tour main draw matches.

Opponent	Highest ranking	Matches	Won	Lost	Win %	Last match
(Spain) Juan Carlos Ferrero	1	3	2	1	67%	Lost (4–6, 5–7) at 2011 Barcelona 2R
(United Kingdom) Andy Murray	1	2	1	1	50%	Won (7–5, 5–7, 6–2, 6–4) at 2017 Australian Open 4R
(Russia) Marat Safin	1	1	0	1	0%	Lost (6–7^{(4–7)}, 7–5, 5–7) at 2006 Bangkok QF
(Serbia) **Novak Djokovic**	1	2	0	2	0%	Lost (6–3, 6–7^{(4–7)}, 3–6) at 2016 Shanghai QF
(Spain) Rafael Nadal	1	3	0	3	0%	Lost (3–6, 3–6) at 2019 Acapulco 1R
(Switzerland) Roger Federer	1	6	0	6	0%	Lost (6–3, 4–6, 2–6) at 2018 Stuttgart 2R
(Germany) Tommy Haas	2	2	1	1	50%	Won (6–4, 6–4) at 2017 Stuttgart QF
(Germany) **Alexander Zverev**	2	1	0	1	0%	Lost (3–6, 5–7) at 2018 Washington 3R
(Spain) David Ferrer	3	2	1	1	50%	Lost (3–6, 1–6) at 2019 Barcelona 1R
(Austria) Dominic Thiem	3	2	1	1	50%	Lost (1–6, 4–6) at 2017 Indian Wells 3R
(Russia) Nikolay Davydenko	3	3	1	2	33%	Lost (6–2, 3–6, 3–6) at 2012 Metz 1R
(Switzerland) **Stan Wawrinka**	3	3	1	2	33%	Lost (6–4, 3–6, 3–6) at 2017 Geneva F
(Argentina) David Nalbandian	3	1	0	1	0%	Lost (3–6, 4–6, 2–6) at 2007 Wimbledon 1R
(Argentina) Juan Martín del Potro	3	2	0	2	0%	Lost (1–6, 2–6) at 2018 Acapulco 1R
(Croatia) **Marin Čilić**	3	3	0	3	0%	Lost (6–4, 5–7, 3–6) at 2016 Basel SF
(Bulgaria) **Grigor Dimitrov**	3	4	0	4	0%	Lost (6–7^{(5–7)}, 5–7) at 2018 Cincinnati 2R
(Japan) **Kei Nishikori**	4	1	1	0	100%	Won (6–4, 3–6, 6–3) at 2017 Geneva SF
(Czech Republic) Tomáš Berdych	4	6	2	4	33%	Lost (5–7, 3–6) at 2018 Rotterdam 1R
(Germany) Rainer Schüttler	5	1	1	0	100%	Won (7–6^{(9–7)}, 7–5) at 2006 Bangkok 2R
(United States) **Taylor Fritz**	5	2	1	1	50%	Lost (6–4, 6–2, 4–6, 6–7^{(2–7)}, 2–6) at 2018 US Open 1R
(Spain) Tommy Robredo	5	4	1	3	25%	Lost (3–6, 6–3, 2–6) at 2011 Indian Wells 2R
(Chile) Fernando González	5	1	0	1	0%	Lost (5–7, 7–6^{(7–0)}, 2–2 ret.) at 2009 Shanghai 1R
(South Africa) Kevin Anderson	5	2	0	2	0%	Lost (1–6, 7–6^{(7–3)}, 3–6, 6–7^{(4–7)}) at 2018 French Open 3R
(France) Jo-Wilfried Tsonga	5	3	0	3	0%	Lost (3–6, 0–6) at 2019 Stuttgart 1R
(Canada) **Félix Auger-Aliassime**	6	1	1	0	100%	Won (6–2, 6–7^{(4–7)}, 6–1) at 2018 Monte Carlo 1R
(France) Gilles Simon	6	3	2	1	67%	Lost (3–6, 2–6) at 2010 Metz F
(Belgium) **David Goffin**	7	2	1	1	50%	Lost (1–6, 0–2 ret.) at 2016 Marseille 2R
(Spain) Fernando Verdasco	7	5	1	4	20%	Won (6–4, 6–4) at 2017 Cincinnati 1R
(Croatia) Mario Ančić	7	1	0	1	0%	Lost (1–6, 0–6) at 2008 Barcelona 1R
(United States) Mardy Fish	7	1	0	1	0%	Lost (2–6, 4–6) at 2010 Delray Beach 2R
(France) Richard Gasquet	7	3	0	3	0%	Lost (3–6, 4–6, 3–6) at 2019 French Open 1R
(Russia) Mikhail Youzhny	8	3	3	0	100%	Won (6–4, 6–2) at 2018 Atlanta 2R
(Austria) Jürgen Melzer	8	4	2	2	50%	Lost (5–7, 4–6) at 2013 Kuala Lumpur 2R
(United States) John Isner	8	7	3	4	43%	Lost (3–6, 6–7^{(4–7)}) at 2020 Acapulco 1R
(Argentina) Guillermo Cañas	8	1	0	1	0%	Lost (7–5, 3–6, 3–6) at 2008 s-Hertogenbosch 1R
(Poland) **Hubert Hurkacz**	8	1	0	1	0%	Lost (4–6, 3–6) at 2020 Cologne 2R
(United States) Jack Sock	8	1	0	1	0%	Lost (1–6, 1–6, 2–6) at 2016 US Open 2R
(Russia) **Karen Khachanov**	8	2	0	2	0%	Lost (6–7^{(5–7)}, 3–6) at 2018 Halle 1R
(Serbia) Janko Tipsarević	8	3	0	3	0%	Lost (3–6, 1–6, 4–6) at 2011 Australian Open 1R
(Australia) **Alex de Minaur**	9	1	1	0	100%	Won (6–3, 6–3) at 2017 Brisbane 1R
(Italy) **Fabio Fognini**	9	4	3	1	75%	Won (7–6^{(7–3)}, 6–4) at 2016 Shenzhen 2R
(Spain) Nicolás Almagro	9	2	1	1	50%	Won (6–4, 6–2) at 2017 Sydney 1R
(Spain) **Roberto Bautista Agut**	9	1	0	1	0%	Lost (3–6, 4–6) at 2017 Valencia QF
(Chile) Nicolás Massú	9	1	0	1	0%	Lost (4–6, 2–6) at 2010 Houston 1R
(France) **Lucas Pouille**	10	1	1	0	100%	Won (2–6, 6–1, 7–6^{(7–3)}) at 2018 Monte Carlo 2R
(Canada) **Denis Shapovalov**	10	1	1	0	100%	Won (6–3, 6–3) at 2018 Eastbourne QF
(France) Arnaud Clément	10	2	1	1	50%	Won (6–4, 5–7, 6–2) at 2009 Marseille 2R
(Argentina) Juan Mónaco	10	2	1	1	50%	Lost (0–6, 2–6) at 2010 Shanghai 3R
(Spain) **Pablo Carreño Busta**	10	3	1	2	33%	Lost (3–6, 6–7^{(2–7)}) at 2017 Cincinnati 2R
Total		116	37	79	32%	* Statistics correct as of 16 May 2024

== Top 10 wins ==
- He has a 7–25 record against players who were, at the time the match was played, ranked in the top 10.

Year	2005	2006	2007	2008	2009	2010	2011	2012	2013	2014	2015	2016	2017	2018	2019	2020	2021	2022	2023	Total
Wins	0	0	0	1	2	1	0	0	0	0	0	1	2	0	0	0	0	0	0	7

#	Player	Rank	Event	Surface	Rd	Score	Rank
2008
1.	(Spain) David Ferrer	5	Rotterdam Open, Netherlands	Hard (i)	2R	6–2, 7–5	98
2009
2.	(France) Gilles Simon	7	Rome Masters, Italy	Clay	3R	6–4, 6–1	76
3.	(France) Gilles Simon	7	Stuttgart MercedesCup, Germany	Clay	2R	6–4, 6–2	45
2010
4.	(Russia) Nikolay Davydenko	6	Shanghai Masters, China	Hard	2R	6–4, 7–6^{(7–3)}	118
2016
5.	(Switzerland) Stan Wawrinka	3	Basel Swiss Indoors, Switzerland	Hard (i)	QF	6–2, 5–7, 6–1	72
2017
6.	(United Kingdom) Andy Murray	1	Australian Open, Melbourne, Australia	Hard	4R	7–5, 5–7, 6–2, 6–4	50
7.	(Japan) Kei Nishikori	9	Geneva Open, Switzerland	Clay	SF	6–4, 3–6, 6–3	33

== Records ==
The following record was attained during the Open Era.

Time span	Record	Players matched
2016	10 times qualified for an ATP Tour main draw in 1 season.	Stands alone
