= 2008 Countrywide Classic =

- Date: August 4–10
- Edition: 82nd
- Category: International Series
- Draw: 28S / 16D
- Prize money: $450,000
- Surface: Hard / outdoor
- Location: Los Angeles, United States
- Venue: Los Angeles Tennis Center

Champions

Singles
- (Argentina) Juan Martín del Potro

Doubles
- (India) Rohan Bopanna / (United States) Eric Butorac
← 2007 ·	Los Angeles Open	· 2009 →

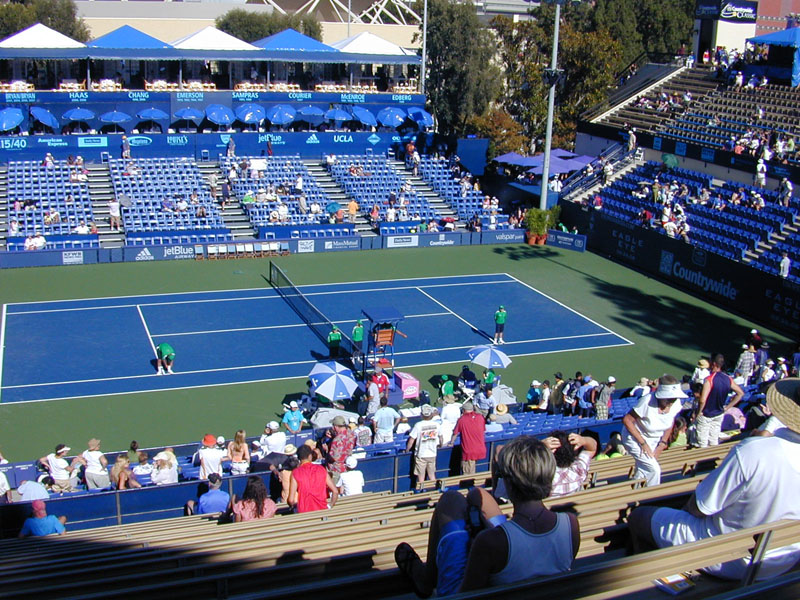
Los Angeles Tennis Center's Straus Stadium court

The 2008 Countrywide Classic was a tennis tournament played on outdoor hard courts. It was the 82nd edition of the Los Angeles Open, and was part of the International Series of the 2008 ATP Tour. It took place at the Los Angeles Tennis Center in Los Angeles, United States, from August 4 through August 10, 2008.

The singles draw featured ATP No. 9, San Jose and Dubai champion Andy Roddick, Nottingham runner-up and Umag titlist Fernando Verdasco, and winner of back-to-back titles in Stuttgart and Kitzbühel Juan Martín del Potro. Also present were Dubai finalist and Wimbledon quarterfinalist Feliciano López, Wimbledon semifinalist Marat Safin, Mardy Fish, Carlos Moyá and Tommy Haas.

In addition to the singles and doubles events, a Legends Invitational Singles competition took place, featuring Jim Courier, Aaron Krickstein, John McEnroe, Mikael Pernfors, Jimmy Arias and Wayne Ferreira. 1997 Countrywide Classic champion Jim Courier won the event, defeating 1981 and 1986 titlist John McEnroe in the final.

Four time Countrywide Classic champion Roy Emerson was the tournament honoree for 2008. He won the singles titles here in 1959, 1962, 1964 and 1967. Emerson also won the doubles crowns in 1961, 1962, 1964, 1965, and 1967.

== Finals ==
=== Singles ===
(Argentina) Juan Martín del Potro defeated (United States) Andy Roddick, 6–1, 7–6^{(7–2)}

- It was Del Potro's third singles title of the year and of his career.

=== Doubles ===
(India) Rohan Bopanna / (United States) Eric Butorac defeated (United States) Travis Parrott / (Serbia) Dušan Vemić, 7–6^{(7–5)}, 7–6^{(7–5)}
