= 2016 Stockholm Open =

- Date: 17–23 October
- Edition: 48th
- Category: ATP World Tour 250 series
- Draw: 28S / 16D
- Prize money: €566,525
- Surface: Hard / Indoor
- Location: Stockholm, Sweden
- Venue: Kungliga tennishallen

Champions

Singles
- (Argentina) Juan Martín del Potro

Doubles
- (Sweden) Elias Ymer / (Sweden) Mikael Ymer
← 2015 ·	Stockholm Open	· 2017 →

The 2016 Stockholm Open (also known as the 2016 If Stockholm Open due to sponsorship) was a professional men's tennis tournament played on indoor hard courts. It was the 48th edition of the tournament, and part of the ATP World Tour 250 series of the 2016 ATP World Tour. It occurred at the Kungliga tennishallen in Stockholm, Sweden, from 17 October until 23 October 2016. Unseeded Juan Martín del Potro, who entered the main draw on a wildcard, won the singles title.

== Finals ==
=== Singles ===
- (Argentina) Juan Martín del Potro defeated (United States) Jack Sock, 7–5, 6–1
- This was del Potro's only singles title of the year and the 19th of his career.

=== Doubles ===
- (Sweden) Elias Ymer / (Sweden) Mikael Ymer defeated (Croatia) Mate Pavić / (New Zealand) Michael Venus, 6–1, 6–1

== Singles main-draw entrants ==
=== Seeds ===
Country	Player	Rank^{1}	Seed
FRA	Gaël Monfils	8	1
BUL	Grigor Dimitrov	18	2
CRO	Ivo Karlović	20	3
GER	Alexander Zverev	21	4
USA	Steve Johnson	24	5
USA	Jack Sock	25	6
USA	John Isner	26	7
CYP	Marcos Baghdatis	36	8

- ^{1} Rankings are as of October 10, 2016

=== Other entrants ===
The following players received wildcards into the singles main draw:

- (Argentina) Juan Martín del Potro
- (Sweden) Elias Ymer
- (Sweden) Mikael Ymer

The following players received entry from the qualifying draw:

- (United States) Ryan Harrison
- (Germany) Tobias Kamke
- (Czech Republic) Adam Pavlásek
- (Estonia) Jürgen Zopp

=== Withdrawals ===
Before the tournament

- (United Kingdom) Daniel Evans →replaced by (Japan) Yūichi Sugita
- (France) Lucas Pouille →replaced by (Germany) Dustin Brown

== Doubles main-draw entrants ==
=== Seeds ===
Country	Player	Country	Player	Rank^{1}	Seed
BRA	Marcelo Melo	BRA	Bruno Soares	9	1
IND	Rohan Boppana	PHI	Treat Huey	43	2
POL	Marcin Matkowski	NED	Jean-Julien Rojer	43	3
CRO	Mate Pavić	NZL	Michael Venus	72	4

- Rankings are as of October 10, 2016

=== Other entrants ===
The following pairs received wildcards into the doubles main draw:

- (Sweden) Isak Arvidsson / (Sweden) Fred Simonsson
- (Sweden) Elias Ymer / (Sweden) Mikael Ymer
