= 2007 Countrywide Classic – Doubles =

Doubles
- 2007 Countrywide Classic

Final
- Champions: (United States) Bob Bryan (United States) Mike Bryan
- Runners-up: (United States) Scott Lipsky (United States) David Martin
- Score: 7–6^{(7–5)}, 6–2

Details
- Draw: 16
- Seeds: 4

Events
Singles	Doubles
← 2006 ·	Los Angeles Open	· 2008 →

Bob Bryan and Mike Bryan were the defending champions and successfully defended their title, defeating Scott Lipsky and David Martin 7–6^{(7–5)}, 6–2, in the final.

== Seeds ==
1. (United States) Bob Bryan / (United States) Mike Bryan (champions)
2. (United States) Eric Butorac / (United Kingdom) Jamie Murray (first round)
3. (South Africa) Jeff Coetzee / (South Africa) Wesley Moodie (semifinals)
4. (Australia) Jordan Kerr / (United States) Jim Thomas (quarterfinals)

== Draw ==
=== Key ===
- Q = Qualifier
- WC = Wild card
- LL = Lucky loser
- Alt = Alternate
- SE = Special exempt
- PR = Protected ranking
- ITF = ITF entry
- JE = Junior exempt
- w/o = Walkover
- r = Retired
- d = Defaulted
- SR = Special ranking

=== Draw ===
First round
1	(United States) B Bryan (United States) M Bryan	7	6
(United States) T Parrott (United States) T Phillips	5	2
(United Kingdom) J Auckland (Australia) S Huss	3	6	[8]
(United States) A Delić (Russia) I Kunitsyn	6	2	[10]
3	(South Africa) J Coetzee (South Africa) W Moodie	6	6
WC	(United States) Z Fleishman (United States) R Thacher	3	4
(Russia) T Gabashvili (United States) V Spadea	6^{3}	3
(Chile) F González (Argentina) D Nalbandian	7^{7}	6
WC	(Thailand) Sa Ratiwatana (Thailand) So Ratiwatana	6	6
(South Korea) H-t Lee (Thailand) D Udomchoke	4	1
(United States) P Goldstein (United States) R Kendrick	5	6	[7]
4	(Australia) J Kerr (United States) J Thomas	7	0	[10]
(United States) M Fish (United States) S Querrey	4	7	[10]
(United Kingdom) A Bogdanovic (United Kingdom) R Hutchins	6	5	[8]
(United States) S Lipsky (United States) D Martin	6	7
2	(United States) E Butorac (United Kingdom) J Murray	3	5

Quarterfinals
1	(United States) B Bryan (United States) M Bryan	7	6
(United States) A Delić (Russia) I Kunitsyn	5	2
3	(South Africa) J Coetzee (South Africa) W Moodie	w/o
(Chile) F González (Argentina) D Nalbandian
WC	(Thailand) Sa Ratiwatana (Thailand) So Ratiwatana	6	6
4	(Australia) J Kerr (United States) J Thomas	4	4
(United States) M Fish (United States) S Querrey	3	4
(United States) S Lipsky (United States) D Martin	6	6

Semifinals
1	(United States) B Bryan (United States) M Bryan	6	7^{7}
3	(South Africa) J Coetzee (South Africa) W Moodie	4	6^{4}
WC	(Thailand) Sa Ratiwatana (Thailand) So Ratiwatana	6	3	[3]
(United States) S Lipsky (United States) D Martin	4	6	[10]

Final
1	(United States) B Bryan (United States) M Bryan	7^{7}	6
(United States) S Lipsky (United States) D Martin	6^{5}	2
