= 2007 Countrywide Classic =

- Date: July 16–23
- Edition: 81st
- Category: ATP International Series
- Draw: 32S / 16D
- Prize money: $500,000
- Surface: Hard / outdoor
- Location: Los Angeles, United States
- Venue: Los Angeles Tennis Center

Champions

Singles
- (Czech Republic) Radek Štěpánek

Doubles
- (United States) Bob Bryan / (United States) Mike Bryan
← 2006 ·	Los Angeles Open	· 2008 →

The 2007 Countrywide Classic was a men's tennis tournament played on outdoor hard courts at the Los Angeles Tennis Center in Los Angeles in the United States and was part of the International Series of the 2007 ATP Tour and of the 2007 US Open Series. It was the 81st edition of the Los Angeles Open and the tournament ran from July 16, 2007, through July 23, 2007. Unseeded Radek Štěpánek won the singles title.

== Finals ==
=== Singles ===
(Czech Republic) Radek Štěpánek defeated (United States) James Blake, 7–6^{(9–7)}, 5–7, 6–2

- It was Štěpánek's only singles title of the year and the 2nd of his career.

=== Doubles ===
(United States) Bob Bryan / (United States) Mike Bryan defeated (United States) Scott Lipsky / (United States) David Martin, 7–6^{(7–5)}, 6–2
