= Juan Martín del Potro career statistics =

Career finals
Discipline	Type	Won	Lost	Total
Singles	Grand Slam	1	1	2
Singles	ATP Finals	0	1	1
Singles	ATP 1000*	1	3	4
Singles	ATP 500	9	4	13
Singles	ATP 250	11	3	14
Singles	Olympics	0	1	1
Singles	Total	22	13	35
Doubles	Grand Slam	–	–	–
Doubles	ATP Finals	–	–	–
Doubles	ATP 1000*	–	–	–
Doubles	ATP 500	–	–	–
Doubles	ATP 250	1	0	1
Doubles	Olympics	–	–	–
Doubles	Total	1	0	1
1) WR = Winning Rate; 2) * formerly known as "Super 9" (1996–1999), "Tennis Masters Series" (2000–2003), or "ATP Masters Series" (2004–2008)

This is a list of the main career statistics of Argentine professional tennis player, Juan Martín del Potro. To date, Del Potro has won 22 Association of Tennis Professionals (ATP) singles titles, including one Grand Slam singles title at the 2009 US Open and one Masters 1000 singles title at the 2018 BNP Paribas Open. He was also the runner-up at the 2009 ATP World Tour Finals, a semifinalist at the 2009 and 2018 French Opens and 2013 Wimbledon Championships, a quarterfinalist at the Australian Open in 2009 and 2012, a bronze medalist at the 2012 London Olympics, and a silver medalist at the 2016 Rio Olympics. On 13 August 2018, Del Potro achieved a career-high singles ranking of world No. 3 for the first time.

== Career achievements ==
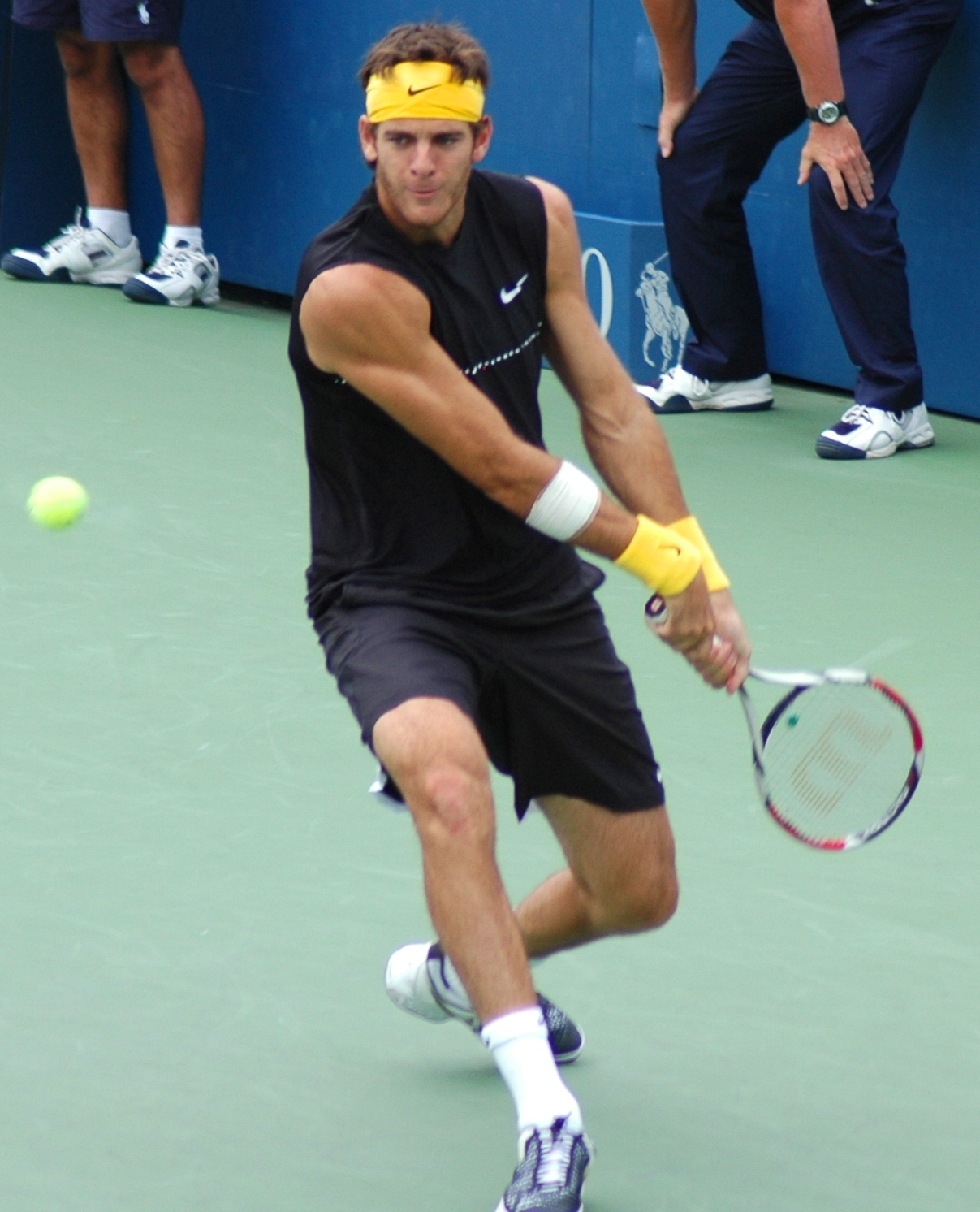
Del Potro won his first Grand Slam singles title at the 2009 US Open.

In 2008, Del Potro became the first player in ATP history to win his first four career titles in as many tournaments. This achievement is also the second-longest winning streak by a teenager in the Open Era, behind Rafael Nadal. Later that year, del Potro reached his first Grand Slam singles quarterfinal at the US Open, losing to Andy Murray in four sets. On October 6, 2008, Del Potro entered the top 10 of the ATP singles rankings for the first time in his career. His strong results throughout the year allowed him to qualify for the year-ending ATP World Tour Finals for the first time in his career. However, he failed to progress beyond the preliminary round-robin stage, losing two of the three matches he played. Nonetheless, Del Potro finished the year as world No. 9, the first time he had finished a year in the top 10.

Del Potro's good form carried over into the new year as he reached his second successive Grand Slam singles quarterfinal at the Australian Open, losing to world No. 2 and eventual runner-up Roger Federer. In June of the same year, del Potro reached his first Grand Slam singles semi-final at the French Open, where he once again lost to the world No. 2 and eventual champion, Roger Federer, this time in five sets. This marked the first time that del Potro had taken a set from Federer. In August, del Potro reached his first ATP Masters Series singles final at the Rogers Cup in Canada, losing to Andy Murray in three sets. Later that year, del Potro reached his first US Open final by defeating then-world No. 3, Rafael Nadal, in the semifinals in straight sets. Del Potro went on to win his first Grand Slam singles title by defeating world no. 1 and five-time defending champion Federer for the first time in his career, prevailing in five sets. In November, del Potro lost to Nikolay Davydenko in the final of the ATP World Tour Finals, in straight sets.

In January 2010, del Potro achieved a career-high singles ranking of world No. 4, but a wrist injury prevented him from competing for most of the year. In February 2011, del Potro won his first singles title since returning to the tour from injury, defeating Janko Tipsarević in the final of the Delray Beach International Tennis Championships. Later that year, del Potro reached the fourth round of the Wimbledon Championships for the first time in his career, but lost in four sets to world No. 1 and eventual runner-up, Rafael Nadal. In January 2012, del Potro reached his first Grand Slam singles quarterfinal since returning from injury at the 2012 Australian Open, but lost in straight sets to Roger Federer in a rematch of their quarterfinal match at the same event from three years prior. At the 2012 London Olympics, del Potro progressed to the semifinals, where he lost to Federer in a four-hour, three-set match. However, he won the bronze medal by defeating world No. 2, Novak Djokovic, in straight sets.

In March 2013, del Potro defeated Murray and Djokovic at Indian Wells to reach his first ATP Masters 1000 final since returning from injury, where he lost to Rafael Nadal in three sets. Later that year, del Potro reached his first Wimbledon semi-final, but lost in five sets to the eventual runner-up, Novak Djokovic. With this achievement, del Potro had reached the quarterfinals or better at all four Grand Slam events. In October, del Potro reached his third ATP Masters 1000 final at the 2013 Shanghai Rolex Masters, after defeating Rafael Nadal in the semifinals in straight sets. However, he lost to the defending champion, Novak Djokovic in the final in three sets. In March 2018, del Potro finally won a Masters 1000 tournament in his fourth final, by defeating Roger Federer at the 2018 BNP Paribas Open.

As of March 2018, del Potro has notched 10 wins over No. 1-ranked players, three over Nadal, four over Federer, and three over Djokovic. All of his wins came in high-profile events including the ATP Tour World Tour Finals, Grand Slam tournaments, the Olympics, Masters 1000 events, and Davis Cup play. He is also one of only three players to have notched 3+ wins over each of the Big Four, along with Stan Wawrinka and Tomáš Berdych.

== Performance timelines ==
Key
W	F	SF	QF	#R	RR	Q#	P#	DNQ	A	Z#	PO	G	S	B	NMS	NTI	P	NH

(W) winner; (F) finalist; (SF) semifinalist; (QF) quarterfinalist; (#R) rounds 4, 3, 2, 1; (RR) round-robin stage; (Q#) qualification round; (P#) preliminary round; (DNQ) did not qualify; (A) absent; (Z#) Davis/Fed Cup Zonal Group (with number indication) or (PO) play-off; (G) gold, (S) silver or (B) bronze Olympic/Paralympic medal; (NMS) not a Masters tournament; (NTI) not a Tier I tournament; (P) postponed; (NH) not held; (SR) strike rate (events won / competed); (W–L) win–loss record.
To avoid confusion and double counting, these charts are updated at the conclusion of a tournament or when the player's participation has ended.

=== Singles ===
Tournament	2005	2006	2007	2008	2009	2010	2011	2012	2013	2014	2015	2016	2017	2018	2019	2020	2021	2022	SR	W–L	Win%
Grand Slam tournaments
Australian Open	A	A	2R	2R	QF	4R	2R	QF	3R	2R	A	A	A	3R	A	A	A	A	0 / 9	19–9	68%
French Open	A	1R	1R	2R	SF	A	3R	QF	A	A	A	A	3R	SF	4R	A	A	A	0 / 9	22–9	71%
Wimbledon	A	A	2R	2R	2R	A	4R	4R	SF	A	A	3R	2R	QF	A	NH	A	A	0 / 9	21–9	70%
US Open	Q1	1R	3R	QF	W	A	3R	QF	2R	A	A	QF	SF	F	A	A	A	A	1 / 10	35–9	80%
Win–loss	0–0	0–2	4–4	7–4	17–3	3–1	8–4	15–4	8–3	1–1	0–0	6–2	8–3	17–4	3–1	0–0	0–0	0–0	1 / 37	97–36	73%
Year-end championship
ATP Finals	did not qualify			RR	F	DNQ		SF	RR	did not qualify				A (Note: 2018 ATP Finals qualified but withdrawal before tournament.)	did not qualify				0 / 4	7–8	47%
National representation
Summer Olympics	not held			A	not held			SF-B	not held			F-S	not held				A	NH	0 / 2	10–2	83%
Davis Cup	A	A	QF	F	QF	A	F	SF	A	A	A	W	A	A	A	A	A	A	1 / 6	15–4	79%
ATP Tour Masters 1000
Indian Wells Masters	A	A	2R	A	QF	A	SF	QF	F	A	A	2R	3R	W	A	NH	A	A	1 / 8	24–7	77%
Miami Open	A	A	4R	2R	SF	A	4R	4R	2R	A	1R	2R	3R	SF	A	NH	A	A	0 / 10	19–10	66%
Monte-Carlo Masters	A	A	A	Q2	2R	A	A	A	3R	A	A	A	A	A	A	NH	A	A	0 / 2	1–2	33%
Madrid Open (Note: Held as German Open (outdoor clay) until 2008, Madrid Open (outdoor clay) 2009–present.)	A	A	A	A	SF	A	3R	SF	A	A	A	2R	A	3R	2R	NH	A	A	0 / 6	11–5	68%
Italian Open	A	A	Q1	1R	QF	A	A	3R	3R	A	A	A	QF	3R	QF	A	A	A	0 / 7	11–7	61%
Canadian Open	A	A	1R	A	F	A	2R	2R	3R	A	A	A	2R	A	A	NH	A	A	0 / 6	7–6	54%
Cincinnati Masters	A	A	3R	A	A	A	2R	SF	SF	A	A	A	3R	QF	A	A	A	A	0 / 6	13–6	68%
Shanghai Masters (Note: Held as Madrid Open (indoor hard) from 2002–2008, Shanghai Masters (outdoor hard) 2009–present.)	A	1R	3R	QF	2R	A	A	A	F	A	A	1R	SF	3R	A	NH			0 / 8	12–8	60%
Paris Masters	A	A	2R	3R	QF	A	A	3R	QF	A	A	A	QF	A	A	A	A	A	0 / 6	9–6	58%
Win–loss	0–0	0–1	9–6	4–4	18–8	0–0	11–4	15–7	16–8	0–0	0–1	3–4	14–7	15–5	2–2	0–0	0–0	0–0	1 / 59	107–57	65%
Career statistics
	2005	2006	2007	2008	2009	2010	2011	2012	2013	2014	2015	2016	2017	2018	2019	2020	2021	2022	SR	W–L	Win%
Tournaments	0	12	24	19	18	3	19	20	19	4	2	13	18	15	5	0	0	1	Career total: 192		
Titles	0	0	0	4	3	0	2	4	4	1	0	1	1	2	0	0	0	0	Career total: 22		
Finals	0	0	0	5	5	0	3	5	6	1	0	2	2	6	0	0	0	0	Career total: 35		
Hard win–loss	0–0	3–4	21–19	27–11	41–11	3–3	33–13	40–12	42–12	7–3	2–2	24–7	30–12	36–9	2–1	0–0	0–0	0–0	18 / 133	311–119	72%
Clay win–loss	0–0	5–7	1–2	15–3	12–4	0–0	10–3	17–3	2–2	0–0	0–0	3–2	7–3	7–3	5–3	0–0	0–0	0–1	4 / 40	84–36	70%
Grass win–loss	0–0	0–0	4–3	4–2	1–1	0–0	5–2	8–2	7–2	0–0	0–0	5–3	1–1	4–1	1–0	0–0	0–0	0–0	0 / 18	40–17	70%
Carpet win–loss	0–0	2–1	2–1	0–0	Discontinued														0 / 1	4–2	67%
Overall win–loss	0–0	10–12	28–25	46–16	54–16	3–3	48–18	65–17	51–16	7–3	2–2	32–12	38–16	47–13	8–4	0–0	0–0	0–1	22 / 192	439–174	72%
Win (%)	–	45%	53%	74%	77%	50%	73%	79%	76%	70%	50%	73%	70%	78%	67%	–	–	0%	Career total: 72%		
Year-end ranking	157	92	44	9	5	258	11	7	5	137	590	38	11	5	122	157	756	–	$25,896,046		

=== Doubles ===
Tournament	2005	2006	2007	2008	2009	2010	2011	2012	2013	2014	2015	2016	2017	2018	2019	2020	2021	2022	SR	W–L
Grand Slam tournaments
Australian Open	A	A	A	A	A	A	A	A	A	A	A	A	A	A	A	A	A	A	0 / 0	0–0
French Open	A	1R	1R	A	A	A	A	A	A	A	A	A	A	A	A	A	A	A	0 / 2	0–2
Wimbledon	A	A	1R	1R	A	A	A	A	A	A	A	A	A	A	A	NH	A	A	0 / 2	0–2
US Open	A	A	A	A	A	A	A	A	A	A	A	A	A	A	A	A	A	A	0 / 0	0–0
Win–loss	0–0	0–1	0–2	0–1	0–0	0–0	0–0	0–0	0–0	0–0	0–0	0–0	0–0	0–0	0–0	0–0	0–0	0–0	0 / 4	0–4
National representation
Summer Olympics	not held			A	not held			A	not held			2R	not held				A	NH	0 / 1	1–1
Davis Cup	A	A	QF	F	QF	A	F	SF	A	A	A	W	A	A	A	A	A	A	0 / 6	1–2
ATP Tour Masters 1000
Indian Wells Masters	A	A	A	A	QF	A	A	A	A	1R	A	2R	1R	1R	A	NH	A	A	0 / 5	3–5
Madrid Open	A	A	A	A	SF	A	A	A	A	A	A	A	A	1R	2R	NH	A	A	0 / 3	4–3
Italian Open	A	A	A	A	A	A	A	A	1R	A	A	A	1R	2R	1R	A	A	A	0 / 4	1–3
Canadian Open	A	A	A	A	A	A	A	A	A	A	A	A	2R	A	A	NH	A	A	0 / 1	1–1
Paris Masters	A	A	A	A	1R	A	A	A	A	A	A	A	A	A	A	A	A	A	0 / 1	0–1
Win–loss	0–0	0–0	0–0	0–0	5–3	0–0	0–0	0–0	0–1	0–1	0–0	1–1	1–3	1–2	1–2	0–0	0–0	0–0	0 / 14	9–13
Career statistics
	2005	2006	2007	2008	2009	2010	2011	2012	2013	2014	2015	2016	2017	2018	2019	2020	2021	2022	Career	
Tournaments	0	5	9	5	4	0	5	1	3	2	0	5	4	4	2	0	0	0	49	
Titles / Finals	0 / 0	0 / 0	1 / 1	0 / 0	0 / 0	0 / 0	0 / 0	0 / 0	0 / 0	0 / 0	0 / 0	0 / 0	0 / 0	0 / 0	0 / 0	0 / 0	0 / 0	0 / 0	1 / 1	
Overall win–loss	0–0	1–3	6–8	6–4	7–4	0–0	8–5	1–1	2–2	1–1	0–0	4–7	2–4	2–3	1–2	0–0	0–0	0–0	41–44	
Year-end ranking	291	252	178	262	118	–	185	563	796	579	–	354	314	322	444	497	792	–	48%	

== Grand Slam tournament finals ==
=== Singles: 2 (1 title, 1 runner-up) ===
Result	Year	Tournament	Surface	Opponent	Score
Win	2009	US Open	Hard	(Switzerland) Roger Federer	3–6, 7–6^{(7–5)}, 4–6, 7–6^{(7–4)}, 6–2
Loss	2018	US Open	Hard	(Serbia) Novak Djokovic	3–6, 6–7^{(4–7)}, 3–6

== Other significant finals ==
=== Olympics medal matches ===
==== Singles: 2 (1 silver medal, 1 bronze medal) ====
Result	Year	Location	Surface	Opponent	Score
Bronze	2012	London Olympics	Grass	(Serbia) Novak Djokovic	7–5, 6–4
Silver	2016	Rio Olympics	Hard	(United Kingdom) Andy Murray	5–7, 6–4, 2–6, 5–7

=== Year-end championships finals ===
==== Singles: 1 (1 runner-up) ====
Result	Year	Tournament	Surface	Opponent	Score
Loss	2009	ATP World Tour Finals	Hard (i)	(Russia) Nikolay Davydenko	3–6, 4–6

=== Masters 1000 finals ===
==== Singles: 4 (1 title, 3 runner-ups) ====
Result	Year	Tournament	Surface	Opponent	Score
Loss	2009	Canadian Open	Hard	(United Kingdom) Andy Murray	7–6^{(7–4)}, 6–7^{(3–7)}, 1–6
Loss	2013	Indian Wells Masters	Hard	(Spain) Rafael Nadal	6–4, 3–6, 4–6
Loss	2013	Shanghai Masters	Hard	(Serbia) Novak Djokovic	1–6, 6–3, 6–7^{(3–7)}
Win	2018	Indian Wells Masters	Hard	(Switzerland) Roger Federer	6–4, 6–7^{(8–10)}, 7–6^{(7–2)}

== ATP career finals ==
=== Singles: 35 (22 titles, 13 runner-ups) ===
Legend Grand Slam tournaments (1–1) ATP World Tour Finals (0–1) ATP World Tour Masters 1000 (1–3) Olympic Games (0–1) ATP World Tour 500 Series (9–4) ATP World Tour 250 Series (11–3)	Finals by surface Hard (18–13) Clay (4–0) Grass (0–0)	Finals by setting Outdoor (15–9) Indoor (7–4)

Result	W–L	Date	Tournament	Tier	Surface	Opponent	Score
Win	1–0	Jul 2008	Stuttgart Open, Germany	Intl. Gold	Clay	(France) Richard Gasquet	6–4, 7–5
Win	2–0	Jul 2008	Austria Open, Austria	Intl. Gold	Clay	(Austria) Jürgen Melzer	6–2, 6–1
Win	3–0	Aug 2008	Los Angeles Open, United States	International	Hard	(United States) Andy Roddick	6–1, 7–6^{(7–2)}
Win	4–0	Aug 2008	Washington Open, United States	International	Hard	(Serbia) Viktor Troicki	6–3, 6–3
Loss	4–1	Oct 2008	Japan Open, Japan	Intl. Gold	Hard	(Czech Republic) Tomáš Berdych	1–6, 4–6
Win	5–1	Jan 2009	Auckland Open, New Zealand	250 Series	Hard	(United States) Sam Querrey	6–4, 6–4
Win	6–1	Aug 2009	Washington Open, United States (2)	500 Series	Hard	(United States) Andy Roddick	3–6, 7–5, 7–6^{(8–6)}
Loss	6–2	Aug 2009	Canadian Open, Canada	Masters 1000	Hard	(United Kingdom) Andy Murray	7–6^{(7–4)}, 6–7^{(3–7)}, 1–6
Win	7–2	Sep 2009	US Open, United States	Grand Slam	Hard	(Switzerland) Roger Federer	3–6, 7–6^{(7–5)}, 4–6, 7–6^{(7–4)}, 6–2
Loss	7–3	Nov 2009	ATP World Tour Finals, United Kingdom	Tour Finals	Hard (i)	(Russia) Nikolay Davydenko	3–6, 4–6
Win	8–3	Feb 2011	Delray Beach Open, United States	250 Series	Hard	(Serbia) Janko Tipsarević	6–4, 6–4
Win	9–3	May 2011	Estoril Open, Portugal	250 Series	Clay	(Spain) Fernando Verdasco	6–2, 6–2
Loss	9–4	Oct 2011	Vienna Open, Austria	250 Series	Hard (i)	(France) Jo-Wilfried Tsonga	7–6^{(7–5)}, 3–6, 4–6
Loss	9–5	Feb 2012	Rotterdam Open, Netherlands	500 Series	Hard (i)	(Switzerland) Roger Federer	1–6, 4–6
Win	10–5	Feb 2012	Open 13, France	250 Series	Hard (i)	(France) Michaël Llodra	6–4, 6–4
Win	11–5	May 2012	Estoril Open, Portugal (2)	250 Series	Clay	(France) Richard Gasquet	6–4, 6–2
Win	12–5	Oct 2012	Vienna Open, Austria	250 Series	Hard (i)	(Slovenia) Grega Žemlja	7–5, 6–3
Win	13–5	Oct 2012	Swiss Indoors, Switzerland	500 Series	Hard (i)	(Switzerland) Roger Federer	6–4, 6–7^{(5–7)}, 7–6^{(7–3)}
Win	14–5	Feb 2013	Rotterdam Open, Netherlands	500 Series	Hard (i)	(France) Julien Benneteau	7–6^{(7–2)}, 6–3
Loss	14–6	Mar 2013	Indian Wells Masters, United States	Masters 1000	Hard	(Spain) Rafael Nadal	6–4, 3–6, 4–6
Win	15–6	Aug 2013	Washington Open, United States (3)	500 Series	Hard	(United States) John Isner	3–6, 6–1, 6–2
Win	16–6	Oct 2013	Japan Open, Japan	500 Series	Hard	(Canada) Milos Raonic	7–6^{(7–5)}, 7–5
Loss	16–7	Oct 2013	Shanghai Masters, China	Masters 1000	Hard	(Serbia) Novak Djokovic	1–6, 6–3, 6–7^{(3–7)}
Win	17–7	Oct 2013	Swiss Indoors, Switzerland (2)	500 Series	Hard (i)	(Switzerland) Roger Federer	7–6^{(7–3)}, 2–6, 6–4
Win	18–7	Jan 2014	Sydney International, Australia	250 Series	Hard	(Australia) Bernard Tomic	6–3, 6–1
Loss	18–8	Aug 2016	Olympic Games, Brazil	Olympics	Hard	(United Kingdom) Andy Murray	5–7, 6–4, 2–6, 5–7
Win	19–8	Oct 2016	Stockholm Open, Sweden	250 Series	Hard (i)	(United States) Jack Sock	7–5, 6–1
Win	20–8	Oct 2017	Stockholm Open, Sweden (2)	250 Series	Hard (i)	(Bulgaria) Grigor Dimitrov	6–4, 6–2
Loss	20–9	Oct 2017	Swiss Indoors, Switzerland	500 Series	Hard (i)	(Switzerland) Roger Federer	7–6^{(7–5)}, 4–6, 3–6
Loss	20–10	Jan 2018	Auckland Open, New Zealand	250 Series	Hard	(Spain) Roberto Bautista Agut	1–6, 6–4, 5–7
Win	21–10	Mar 2018	Mexican Open, Mexico	500 Series	Hard	(South Africa) Kevin Anderson	6–4, 6–4
Win	22–10	Mar 2018	Indian Wells Masters, United States	Masters 1000	Hard	(Switzerland) Roger Federer	6–4, 6–7^{(8–10)}, 7–6^{(7–2)}
Loss	22–11	Aug 2018	Los Cabos Open, Mexico	250 Series	Hard	(Italy) Fabio Fognini	4–6, 2–6
Loss	22–12	Sep 2018	US Open, United States	Grand Slam	Hard	(Serbia) Novak Djokovic	3–6, 6–7^{(4–7)}, 3–6
Loss	22–13	Oct 2018	China Open, China	500 Series	Hard	(Georgia (country)) Nikoloz Basilashvili	4–6, 4–6

=== Doubles: 1 (1 title) ===
Legend Grand Slam tournaments (0–0) ATP World Tour Finals (0–0) ATP World Tour Masters 1000 (0–0) ATP World Tour 500 Series (0–0) ATP World Tour 250 Series (1–0)	Finals by surface Hard (1–0) Clay (0–0) Grass (0–0)	Finals by setting Outdoor (1–0) Indoor (0–0)

Result	W–L	Date	Tournament	Tier	Surface	Partner	Opponents	Score
Win	1–0	Jul 2007	Indianapolis Championships, United States	International	Hard	(United States) Travis Parrott	(Russia) Teymuraz Gabashvili (Croatia) Ivo Karlović	3–6, 6–2, [10–6]

== ATP Challenger and ITF Futures finals ==
=== Singles: 8 (6–2) ===
Legend (singles) ATP Challenger Tour (3–1) ITF Futures Tour (3–1)	Finals by Surface Hard (1–2) Clay (5–0) Grass (0–0) Carpet (0–0)

Result	W–L	Date	Tournament	Tier	Surface	Opponent	Score
Loss	0–1	Feb 2005	Mexico F1, Naucalpan	Futures	Hard	(Serbia and Montenegro) Darko Mađarovski	6–3, 4–6, 4–6
Win	1–1	Apr 2005	Chile F1, Santiago	Futures	Clay	(Chile) Jorge Aguilar	6–4, 7–6^{(8–6)}
Win	2–1	Apr 2005	Chile F2, Santiago	Futures	Clay	(Brazil) Thiago Alves	6–1, 6–1
Win	3–1	May 2005	Argentina F3, Córdoba	Futures	Clay	(Argentina) Damián Patriarca	6–0, 3–2 ret.
Loss	3–2	Jul 2005	Campos do Jordão, Brazil	Challenger	Hard	(Brazil) André Sá	4–6, 4–6
Win	4–2	Nov 2005	Montevideo, Uruguay	Challenger	Clay	(Serbia and Montenegro) Boris Pashanski	6–3, 2–6, 7–6^{(7–3)}
Win	5–2	Apr 2006	Aguascalientes, Mexico	Challenger	Clay	(Argentina) Sergio Roitman	3–6, 6–4, 6–3
Win	6–2	Aug 2006	Segovia, Spain	Challenger	Hard	(Germany) Benjamin Becker	6–4, 5–7, 6–4

=== Doubles: 5 (2–3) ===
Legend (doubles) ATP Challenger Tour (2–3) ITF Futures Tour (0–0)	Finals by Surface Hard (0–2) Clay (2–1) Grass (0–0) Carpet (0–0)

Result	W–L	Date	Tournament	Tier	Surface	Partner	Opponents	Score
Loss	0–1	Aug 2005	Belo Horizonte, Brazil	Challenger	Hard	(Argentina) Máximo González	(United States) Lesley Joseph (Serbia and Montenegro) Aleksandar Vlaški	6–7^{(6–8)}, 4–6
Win	1–1	Nov 2005	Guayaquil, Ecuador	Challenger	Clay	(Costa Rica) Juan Antonio Marín	(Peru) Luis Horna (Peru) Iván Miranda	walkover
Win	2–1	Apr 2006	Aguascalientes, Mexico	Challenger	Clay	(Argentina) Martín Vassallo Argüello	(Mexico) Hector Almada (Mexico) Víctor Romero	7–5, 7–5
Loss	2–2	Jul 2006	Biella, Italy	Challenger	Clay	(Argentina) Martín Vassallo Argüello	(Argentina) Lucas Arnold Ker (Argentina) Agustín Calleri	6–7^{(5–7)}, 2–6
Loss	2–3	Mar 2007	Sunrise, United States	Challenger	Hard	(Argentina) Sebastián Prieto	(Greece) Konstantinos Economidis (Belgium) Kristof Vliegen	3–6, 4–6

== Team competition finals: 3 (1 title, 2 runner-ups) ==
Result	W–L	Date	Tournament	Surface	Partner	Opponents	Score
Loss	0–1	Nov 2008	Davis Cup, Argentina	Hard (i)	(Argentina) David Nalbandian (Argentina) José Acasuso (Argentina) Agustín Calleri	(Spain) David Ferrer (Spain) Fernando Verdasco (Spain) Feliciano López (Spain) Marcel Granollers	1–3
Loss	0–2	Dec 2011	Davis Cup, Spain	Clay (i)	(Argentina) Juan Mónaco (Argentina) David Nalbandian (Argentina) Eduardo Schwank	(Spain) Rafael Nadal (Spain) David Ferrer (Spain) Feliciano López (Spain) Fernando Verdasco	1–3
Win	1–2	Nov 2016	Davis Cup, Croatia	Hard (i)	(Argentina) Federico Delbonis (Argentina) Leonardo Mayer (Argentina) Guido Pella	(Croatia) Marin Čilić (Croatia) Ivo Karlović (Croatia) Ivan Dodig (Croatia) Franko Škugor	3–2

== Wins over top-10 players per season ==
- He has a 53–78 record against players who were, at the time the match was played, ranked in the top 10. He has also achieved 10 victories against Number 1 ranked players without reaching the top spot himself, an Open Era record.

Season	2005	2006	2007	2008	2009	2010	2011	2012	2013	2014	2015	2016	2017	2018	2019	2020	2021	Total
Wins	0	0	1	5	11	0	3	8	6	0	0	6	6	7	0	0	0	53

#	Player	Rank	Event	Surface	Rd	Score	JMdP Rank
2007
1.	(Spain) Tommy Robredo	9	Madrid, Spain	Hard (i)	2R	6–7^{(4–7)}, 6–4, 6–3	53
2008
2.	(United States) Andy Roddick	9	Los Angeles, United States	Hard	F	6–1, 7–6^{(7–2)}	24
3.	(Russia) Nikolay Davydenko	6	Davis Cup, Buenos Aires, Argentina	Clay	SF	6–1, 6–4, 6–2	13
4.	(Spain) David Ferrer	5	Tokyo, Japan	Hard	QF	6–1, 7–5	12
5.	(Argentina) David Nalbandian	7	Madrid, Spain	Hard (i)	3R	6–4, 6–2	9
6.	(France) Jo-Wilfried Tsonga	7	Tennis Masters Cup, Shanghai, China	Hard (i)	RR	7–6^{(7–4)}, 7–6^{(7–5)}	8
2009
7.	(Spain) Rafael Nadal	1	Miami, United States	Hard	QF	6–4, 3–6, 7–6^{(7–3)}	7
8.	(United Kingdom) Andy Murray	3	Madrid, Spain	Clay	QF	7–6^{(7–4)}, 6–3	5
9.	(France) Jo-Wilfried Tsonga	9	French Open, Paris, France	Clay	4R	6–1, 6–7^{(5–7)}, 6–1, 6–4	5
10.	(United States) Andy Roddick	5	Washington, United States	Hard	F	3–6, 7–5, 7–6^{(8–6)}	6
11.	(Spain) Rafael Nadal	2	Montreal, Canada	Hard	QF	7–6^{(7–5)}, 6–1	6
12.	(United States) Andy Roddick	5	Montreal, Canada	Hard	SF	4–6, 6–2, 7–5	6
13.	(Spain) Rafael Nadal	3	US Open, New York City, United States	Hard	SF	6–2, 6–2, 6–2	6
14.	(Switzerland) Roger Federer	1	US Open, New York City, United States	Hard	F	3–6, 7–6^{(7–5)}, 4–6, 7–6^{(7–4)}, 6–2	6
15.	(Spain) Fernando Verdasco	8	ATP World Tour Finals, London, United Kingdom	Hard (i)	RR	6–4, 3–6, 7–6^{(7–1)}	5
16.	(Switzerland) Roger Federer	1	ATP World Tour Finals, London, United Kingdom	Hard (i)	RR	6–2, 6–7^{(5–7)}, 6–3	5
17.	(Sweden) Robin Söderling	9	ATP World Tour Finals, London, United Kingdom	Hard (i)	SF	6–7^{(1–7)}, 6–3, 7–6^{(7–3)}	5
2011
18.	(Sweden) Robin Söderling	4	Miami, United States	Hard	3R	6–3, 6–2	51
19.	(Sweden) Robin Söderling	5	Estoril, Portugal	Clay	QF	6–4, 7–5	46
20.	(Serbia) Novak Djokovic	1	Davis Cup, Belgrade, Serbia	Hard (i)	SF	7–6^{(7–5)}, 3–0, ret.	17
2012
21.	(Czech Republic) Tomáš Berdych	7	Rotterdam, Netherlands	Hard (i)	SF	6–3, 6–1	10
22.	(France) Jo-Wilfried Tsonga	6	Marseille, France	Hard (i)	SF	6–4, 6–7^{(9–11)}, 6–3	10
23.	(France) Jo-Wilfried Tsonga	5	Dubai, United Arab Emirates	Hard	QF	7–6^{(7–1)}, 6–2	10
24.	(Czech Republic) Tomáš Berdych	7	French Open, Paris, France	Clay	4R	7–6^{(8–6)}, 1–6, 6–3, 7–5	9
25.	(Serbia) Novak Djokovic	2	Olympics, London, United Kingdom	Grass	SF-B	7–5, 6–4	9
26.	(Switzerland) Roger Federer	1	Basel, Switzerland	Hard (i)	F	6–4, 6–7^{(5–7)}, 7–6^{(7–3)}	8
27.	(Serbia) Janko Tipsarević	9	ATP World Tour Finals, London, United Kingdom	Hard (i)	RR	6–0, 6–4	8
28.	(Switzerland) Roger Federer	2	ATP World Tour Finals, London, United Kingdom	Hard (i)	RR	7–6^{(7–3)}, 4–6, 6–3	7
2013
29.	(United Kingdom) Andy Murray	3	Indian Wells, United States	Hard	QF	6–7^{(5–7)}, 6–3, 6–1	7
30.	(Serbia) Novak Djokovic	1	Indian Wells, United States	Hard	SF	4–6, 6–4, 6–4	7
31.	(Spain) David Ferrer	4	Wimbledon, London, United Kingdom	Grass	QF	6–2, 6–4, 7–6^{(7–5)}	8
32.	(Spain) Rafael Nadal	1	Shanghai, China	Hard	SF	6–2, 6–4	5
33.	(Switzerland) Roger Federer	6	Basel, Switzerland	Hard (i)	F	7–6^{(7–3)}, 2–6, 6–4	5
34.	(France) Richard Gasquet	9	ATP World Tour Finals, London, United Kingdom	Hard (i)	RR	6–7^{(4–7)}, 6–3, 7–5	5
2016
35.	(Switzerland) Stan Wawrinka	5	Wimbledon, London, United Kingdom	Grass	2R	3–6, 6–3, 7–6^{(7–2)}, 6–3	165
36.	(Serbia) Novak Djokovic	1	Olympics, Rio de Janeiro, Brazil	Hard	1R	7–6^{(7–4)}, 7–6^{(7–2)}	141
37.	(Spain) Rafael Nadal	5	Olympics, Rio de Janeiro, Brazil	Hard	SF	5–7, 6–4, 7–6^{(7–5)}	141
38.	(Austria) Dominic Thiem	10	US Open, New York City, United States	Hard	4R	6–3, 3–2, ret.	142
39.	(United Kingdom) Andy Murray	2	Davis Cup, Glasgow, Great Britain	Hard (i)	SF	6–4, 5–7, 6–7^{(5–7)}, 6–3, 6–4	64
40.	(Croatia) Marin Čilić	6	Davis Cup, Zagreb, Croatia	Hard (i)	F	6–7^{(4–7)}, 2–6, 7–5, 6–4, 6–3	38
2017
41.	(Japan) Kei Nishikori	9	Rome, Italy	Clay	3R	7–6^{(7–4)}, 6–3	34
42.	(Austria) Dominic Thiem	8	US Open, New York City, United States	Hard	4R	1–6, 2–6, 6–1, 7–6^{(7–1)}, 6–4	28
43.	(Switzerland) Roger Federer	3	US Open, New York City, United States	Hard	QF	7–5, 3–6, 7–6^{(10–8)}, 6–4	28
44.	(Germany) Alexander Zverev	4	Shanghai, China	Hard	3R	3–6, 7–6^{(7–5)}, 6–4	23
45.	(Bulgaria) Grigor Dimitrov	8	Stockholm, Sweden	Hard (i)	F	6–4, 6–2	19
46.	(Croatia) Marin Čilić	4	Basel, Switzerland	Hard (i)	SF	6–4, 6–4	19
2018
47.	(Austria) Dominic Thiem	6	Acapulco, Mexico	Hard	QF	6–2, 7–6^{(9–7)}	9
48.	(Germany) Alexander Zverev	5	Acapulco, Mexico	Hard	SF	6–4, 6–2	9
49.	(South Africa) Kevin Anderson	8	Acapulco, Mexico	Hard	F	6–4, 6–4	9
50.	(Switzerland) Roger Federer	1	Indian Wells, United States	Hard	F	6–4, 6–7^{(8–10)}, 7–6^{(7–2)}	8
51.	(United States) John Isner	10	French Open, Paris, France	Clay	4R	6–4, 6–4, 6–4	6
52.	(Croatia) Marin Čilić	4	French Open, Paris, France	Clay	QF	7–6^{(7–5)}, 5–7, 6–3, 7–5	6
53.	(Spain) Rafael Nadal	1	US Open, New York City, United States	Hard	SF	7–6^{(7–3)}, 6–2, ret.	3

== ATP Tour career earnings ==
Year	Grand Slam singles titles	ATP singles titles	Total singles titles	Earnings ($)	Money list rank	Ref.
2003	0	0	0	$354	–	
2004	0	0	0	$1,962	1,056	
2005	0	0	0	$38,348	294	
2006	0	0	0	$169,815	131	
2007	0	0	0	$393,660	64	
2008	0	4	4	$1,322,497	9	
2009	1	2	3	$4,753,087	4	
2010	0	0	0	$95,273	200	
2011	0	2	2	$1,047,196	23	
2012	0	4	4	$3,031,003	6	
2013	0	4	4	$4,294,039	5	
2014	0	1	1	$198,558	155	
2015	0	0	0	$23,475	424	
2016	0	1	1	$923,279	43	
2017	0	1	1	$2,335,301	13	
2018	0	2	2	$6,486,251	5	
2019	0	0	0	$530,582	111	
2020–21	0	0	0	$0	–	
2022	0	0	0	$6,460	1088	
Career	1	21	22	$25,896,046	18	

== Exhibition matches ==
=== Singles ===
Result	Date	Tournament	Surface	Opponent	Score
Win	Dec 2024	El Último Desafío, Buenos Aires, Argentina	Hard	(Serbia) Novak Djokovic	6–4, 7–5

=== Doubles ===
Result	Date	Tournament	Surface	Partner	Opponents	Score
Win	Aug 2025	Stars of the Open, US Open Fan Week, New York, United States	Hard	(Brazil) João Fonseca	(United States) Andy Roddick (United States) Alex Michelsen	11–9

=== Mixed Doubles ===
Result	Date	Tournament	Surface	Partner	Opponents	Score
Win	Dec 2024	El Último Desafío, Buenos Aires, Argentina	Hard	(Argentina) Gabriela Sabatini	(Argentina) Gisela Dulko (Serbia) Novak Djokovic	2–1

== See also ==
- Lists of tennis players
- List of Grand Slam men's singles champions
- List of Open Era Grand Slam champions by country
- ATP Finals appearances
- Top ten ranked male tennis players
- Argentina Davis Cup team
- List of Argentina Davis Cup team representatives
