= 2015 Stockholm Open =

- Date: 20–25 October
- Edition: 47th
- Category: ATP World Tour 250 series
- Draw: 28S / 16D
- Prize money: €537,050
- Surface: Hard / Indoor
- Location: Stockholm, Sweden
- Venue: Kungliga tennishallen

Champions

Singles
- (Czech Republic) Tomáš Berdych

Doubles
- (United States) Nicholas Monroe / (United States) Jack Sock
← 2014 ·	Stockholm Open	· 2016 →

The 2015 Stockholm Open (also known as the 2015 If Stockholm Open for sponsorship reasons) was a professional men's tennis tournament played on indoor hard courts. It was the 47th edition of the tournament, and part of the ATP World Tour 250 series of the 2015 ATP World Tour. It took place at the Kungliga tennishallen in Stockholm, Sweden from 20 to 25 October 2015.

== Singles main-draw entrants ==
=== Seeds ===
Country	Player	Rank^{1}	Seed
CZE	Tomáš Berdych	5	1
FRA	Richard Gasquet	11	2
FRA	Gilles Simon	14	3
AUS	Bernard Tomic	20	4
BUL	Grigor Dimitrov	22	5
FRA	Jérémy Chardy	29	6
USA	Jack Sock	33	7
LUX	Gilles Müller	36	8

- ^{1} Rankings are as of October 12, 2015

=== Other entrants ===
The following players received wildcards into the singles main draw:

- (Czech Republic) Tomáš Berdych
- (Finland) Jarkko Nieminen
- (Sweden) Mikael Ymer

The following players received entry from the qualifying draw:

- (Serbia) Filip Krajinović
- (Germany) Maximilian Marterer
- (Croatia) Ante Pavić
- (Germany) Mischa Zverev

The following player received entry as a lucky loser:

- (Spain) Nicolás Almagro

=== Withdrawals ===
Before the tournament

- (Spain) Daniel Muñoz de la Nava (gastroenteritis) →replaced by Nicolás Almagro

=== Retirements ===
- (Cyprus) Marcos Baghdatis (right groin injury)
- (Belgium) Steve Darcis (left ankle injury)

== Doubles main-draw entrants ==
=== Seeds ===
Country	Player	Country	Player	Rank^{1}	Seed
FRA	Jérémy Chardy	SWE	Robert Lindstedt	64	1
USA	Nicholas Monroe	USA	Jack Sock	83	2
USA	Eric Butorac	USA	Scott Lipsky	88	3
GBR	Jonathan Marray	PAK	Aisam-ul-Haq Qureshi	90	4

- Rankings are as of October 12, 2015

=== Other entrants ===
The following pairs received wildcards into the doubles main draw:

- (Sweden) Johan Brunström / (Finland) Jarkko Nieminen
- (Sweden) Isak Arvidsson / (Sweden) Fred Simonsson

=== Withdrawals ===
During the tournament

- (Sweden) Robert Lindstedt (infection)

== Finals ==
=== Singles ===
- (Czech Republic) Tomáš Berdych defeated (United States) Jack Sock, 7–6^{(7–1)}, 6–2

=== Doubles ===
- (United States) Nicholas Monroe / (United States) Jack Sock defeated (Croatia) Mate Pavić / (New Zealand) Michael Venus 7–5, 6–2
