= 2007 Countrywide Classic – Singles =

Singles
- 2007 Countrywide Classic

Final
- Champion: (Czech Republic) Radek Štěpánek
- Runner-up: (United States) James Blake
- Score: 7–6^{(9–7)}, 5–7, 6–2

Details
- Draw: 32 (4 Q / 3 WC )
- Seeds: 8

Events
Singles	Doubles
- Los Angeles Open

Tommy Haas was the defending champion, but did not participate this year.

Radek Štěpánek defeated James Blake 7–6^{(9–7)}, 5–7, 6–2 to win the 2007 Countrywide Classic singles event.

Kei Nishikori made his ATP main draw debut in this tournament. He lost in the first round.

== Seeds ==
1. (Chile) Fernando González (first round)
2. (United States) James Blake (finalist)
3. (Russia) Marat Safin (quarterfinals)
4. (Argentina) David Nalbandian (first round)
5. (Russia) Dmitry Tursunov (second round)
6. (United States) Mardy Fish (second round)
7. (South Korea) Lee Hyung-Taik (semifinals)
8. (United States) Amer Delic (first round)

== Draw ==
Key

- Q = Qualifier
- WC = Wild card
- LL = Lucky loser
- Alt = Alternate
- ITF = ITF entry
- PR = Protected ranking
- SR = Special ranking
- SE = Special exempt
- JE = Junior exempt
- JR = Junior Accelerator Programme entrant
- CO = College Accelerator Programme entrant
- NG = Next Gen Accelerator Program entrant
- w/o = Walkover
- r = Retired
- d = Defaulted

=== Finals ===
Semifinals
(Czech Republic) R Štěpánek	w/o
WC	(Germany) N Kiefer
7	(South Korea) L Hyung-Taik	3	6	3
2	(United States) J Blake	6	4	6

Final
(Czech Republic) R Štěpánek	7^{9}	5	6
2	(United States) J Blake	6^{7}	7	2

=== Section 1 ===
First round
1	(Chile) F González	6^{5}	4
WC	(United States) Z Fleishman	7^{7}	6
Q	(South Africa) W Whitehouse	4	3
(United States) R Kendrick	6	6
(Czech Republic) R Štěpánek	6
(United Kingdom) A Bogdanovic	1	r
(United States) S Querrey	5	4
6/WC	(United States) M Fish	7	6
4	(Argentina) D Nalbandian	6^{5}	5
(Russia) I Kunitsyn	7^{7}	7
(Russia) T Gabashvili	3	3
WC	(Germany) N Kiefer	6	6
LL	(United States) P King	4	2
Q	(Brazil) R Mello	6	6
(Germany) M Berrer	6	6
8	(United States) A Delic	4	4

Second round
WC	(United States) Z Fleishman	7^{7}	6
(United States) R Kendrick	6^{4}	3
(Czech Republic) R Štěpánek	6	6
6/WC	(United States) M Fish	2	2
(Russia) I Kunitsyn	3	2
WC	(Germany) N Kiefer	6	6
Q	(Brazil) R Mello	3	5
(Germany) M Berrer	6	7

Quarterfinals
WC	(United States) Z Fleishman	4	2
(Czech Republic) R Štěpánek	6	6
WC	(Germany) N Kiefer	7^{7}	6
(Germany) M Berrer	6^{5}	1

Semifinals
(Czech Republic) R Štěpánek	w/o
WC	(Germany) N Kiefer

=== Section 2 ===
First round
7	(South Korea) L Hyung-Taik	6	6
(United States) K Kim	3	2
(South Africa) W Moodie	6	6
Q	(Japan) K Nishikori	3	2
(Serbia) I Bozoljac	4	7^{7}	3
Q	(Switzerland) G Bastl	6	6^{5}	6
(Australia) C Guccione	3	7^{7}	6^{2}
3	(Russia) M Safin	6	6^{4}	7^{7}
5	(Russia) D Tursunov	6	6
(Thailand) D Udomchoke	1	4
(United States) V Spadea	7^{7}	6
(Brazil) T Alves	6^{2}	2
(United States) P Goldstein	6	5	6
(Chile) A García	3	7	4
(Austria) A Peya	5	4
2	(United States) J Blake	7	6

Second round
7	(South Korea) L Hyung-Taik	6	3
(South Africa) W Moodie	2	0^{r}
Q	(Switzerland) G Bastl	2	6	4
3	(Russia) M Safin	6	2	6
5	(Russia) D Tursunov	7^{7}	5	3
(United States) V Spadea	6^{5}	7	6
(United States) P Goldstein	0	6	5
2	(United States) J Blake	6	1	7

Quarterfinals
7	(South Korea) L Hyung-Taik	4	7	6
3	(Russia) M Safin	6	5	4
(United States) V Spadea	6^{2}	4
2	(United States) J Blake	7^{7}	6

Semifinals
7	(South Korea) L Hyung-Taik	3	6	3
2	(United States) J Blake	6	4	6
