= 2016 Stockholm Open – Doubles =

Doubles
- 2016 Stockholm Open

Final
- Champions: (Sweden) Elias Ymer (Sweden) Mikael Ymer
- Runners-up: (Croatia) Mate Pavić (New Zealand) Michael Venus
- Score: 6–1, 6–1

Events
Singles	Doubles
- Stockholm Open

Nicholas Monroe and Jack Sock were the defending champions, but chose not to participate this year.

Elias Ymer and Mikael Ymer won the title, defeating Mate Pavić and Michael Venus in the final, 6–1, 6–1.

== Seeds ==
1. (Brazil) Marcelo Melo / (Brazil) Bruno Soares (semifinals)
2. (India) Rohan Bopanna / (Philippines) Treat Huey (semifinals)
3. (Poland) Marcin Matkowski / (Netherlands) Jean-Julien Rojer (first round)
4. (Croatia) Mate Pavić / (New Zealand) Michael Venus (final)

== Draw ==
Key

- Q = Qualifier
- WC = Wild card
- LL = Lucky loser
- Alt = Alternate
- ITF = ITF entry
- PR = Protected ranking
- SR = Special ranking
- SE = Special exempt
- JE = Junior exempt
- JR = Junior Accelerator Programme entrant
- CO = College Accelerator Programme entrant
- NG = Next Gen Accelerator Program entrant
- w/o = Walkover
- r = Retired
- d = Defaulted

=== Draw ===
First round
1	(Brazil) M Melo (Brazil) B Soares	6	1
(South Africa) K Anderson (Argentina) JM del Potro	2	1^{r}
(Germany) G Kretschmer (Slovakia) I Zelenay	6	5	[10]
(Spain) N Almagro (Spain) F Verdasco	4	7	[5]
4	(Croatia) M Pavić (New Zealand) M Venus	7^{7}	6
(United Kingdom) K Skupski (United Kingdom) N Skupski	6^{5}	4
WC	(Sweden) I Arvidsson (Sweden) F Simonsson	7^{8}	4	[10]
(Sweden) R Lindstedt (Pakistan) A-u-H Qureshi	6^{6}	6	[4]
(United Kingdom) J Marray (Canada) A Shamasdin	6	1	[5]
(United Kingdom) C Fleming (United States) S Lipsky	3	6	[10]
WC	(Sweden) E Ymer (Sweden) M Ymer	7^{7}	1	[11]
3	(Poland) M Matkowski (Netherlands) J-J Rojer	6^{2}	6	[9]
(United States) S Johnson (Germany) P Petzschner	4	6	[10]
(Sweden) J Brunström (Sweden) A Siljeström	6	4	[12]
(Cyprus) M Baghdatis (Luxembourg) G Müller	6^{6}	3
2	(India) R Bopanna (Philippines) T Huey	7^{8}	6

Quarterfinals
1	(Brazil) M Melo (Brazil) B Soares	6	6
(Germany) G Kretschmer (Slovakia) I Zelenay	4	4
4	(Croatia) M Pavić (New Zealand) M Venus	6	3	[10]
WC	(Sweden) I Arvidsson (Sweden) F Simonsson	4	6	[8]
(United Kingdom) C Fleming (United States) S Lipsky	3	6	[9]
WC	(Sweden) E Ymer (Sweden) M Ymer	6	4	[11]
(Sweden) J Brunström (Sweden) A Siljeström	6^{7}	4
2	(India) R Bopanna (Philippines) T Huey	7^{9}	6

Semifinals
1	(Brazil) M Melo (Brazil) B Soares	2	4
4	(Croatia) M Pavić (New Zealand) M Venus	6	6
WC	(Sweden) E Ymer (Sweden) M Ymer	6	6
2	(India) R Bopanna (Philippines) T Huey	3	4

Final
4	(Croatia) M Pavić (New Zealand) M Venus	1	1
WC	(Sweden) E Ymer (Sweden) M Ymer	6	6
