= 2015 Stockholm Open – Doubles =

Doubles
- 2015 Stockholm Open

Final
- Champions: (United States) Nicholas Monroe (United States) Jack Sock
- Runners-up: (Croatia) Mate Pavić (New Zealand) Michael Venus
- Score: 7–5, 6–2

Events
Singles	Doubles
- Stockholm Open

Eric Butorac and Raven Klaasen were the defending champions, but Klaasen chose not to participate. Butorac played alongside Scott Lipsky, but lost in the semifinals to Nicholas Monroe and Jack Sock.

Nicholas Monroe and Jack Sock went on to win the title, defeating Mate Pavić and Michael Venus in the final, 7–5, 6–2

== Seeds ==
1. (France) Jérémy Chardy / (Sweden) Robert Lindstedt (quarterfinals, withdrew)
2. (United States) Nicholas Monroe / (United States) Jack Sock (champions)
3. (United States) Eric Butorac / (United States) Scott Lipsky (semifinals)
4. (United Kingdom) Jonathan Marray / (Pakistan) Aisam-ul-Haq Qureshi (quarterfinals)

== Draw ==
Key

- Q = Qualifier
- WC = Wild card
- LL = Lucky loser
- Alt = Alternate
- ITF = ITF entry
- PR = Protected ranking
- SR = Special ranking
- SE = Special exempt
- JE = Junior exempt
- JR = Junior Accelerator Programme entrant
- CO = College Accelerator Programme entrant
- NG = Next Gen Accelerator Program entrant
- w/o = Walkover
- r = Retired
- d = Defaulted

=== Draw ===
First round
1	(France) J Chardy (Sweden) R Lindstedt	6	6
(Germany) B Becker (Germany) A Zverev	2	1
(Israel) J Erlich (Germany) P Petzschner	6	6
(Cyprus) M Baghdatis (Australia) T Kokkinakis	4	2
4	(United Kingdom) J Marray (Pakistan) A-u-H Qureshi	6	3	[10]
WC	(Sweden) J Brunström (Finland) J Nieminen	1	6	[7]
(Argentina) F Delbonis (Argentina) L Mayer	6	4	[5]
(Croatia) M Pavić (New Zealand) M Venus	1	6	[10]
(Poland) M Fyrstenberg (Mexico) S González	4	3
(New Zealand) M Daniell (Brazil) M Demoliner	6	6
(United Kingdom) C Fleming (Luxembourg) G Müller	6^{6}	4
3	(United States) E Butorac (United States) S Lipsky	7^{8}	6
WC	(Sweden) I Arvidsson (Sweden) F Simonsson	1	7^{7}	[5]
(Australia) C Guccione (Brazil) A Sá	6	6^{3}	[10]
(Germany) A Begemann (New Zealand) A Sitak	6^{6}	1
2	(United States) N Monroe (United States) J Sock	7^{8}	6

Quarterfinals
1	(France) J Chardy (Sweden) R Lindstedt
(Israel) J Erlich (Germany) P Petzschner	w/o
4	(United Kingdom) J Marray (Pakistan) A-u-H Qureshi	4	6^{4}
(Croatia) M Pavić (New Zealand) M Venus	6	7^{7}
(New Zealand) M Daniell (Brazil) M Demoliner	6^{4}	5
3	(United States) E Butorac (United States) S Lipsky	7^{7}	7
(Australia) C Guccione (Brazil) A Sá	4	4
2	(United States) N Monroe (United States) J Sock	6	6

Semifinals
(Israel) J Erlich (Germany) P Petzschner	3	3
(Croatia) M Pavić (New Zealand) M Venus	6	6
3	(United States) E Butorac (United States) S Lipsky	4	6^{3}
2	(United States) N Monroe (United States) J Sock	6	7^{7}

Final
(Croatia) M Pavić (New Zealand) M Venus	5	2
2	(United States) N Monroe (United States) J Sock	7	6
