= 2015 Stockholm Open – Singles =

Singles
- 2015 Stockholm Open

Final
- Champion: (Czech Republic) Tomáš Berdych
- Runner-up: (United States) Jack Sock
- Score: 7–6^{(7–1)}, 6–2

Details
- Draw: 28
- Seeds: 8

Events
Singles	Doubles
- Stockholm Open

Tomáš Berdych was the defending champion and successfully retained his title, defeating Jack Sock in the final, 7–6^{(7–1)}, 6–2.

== Seeds ==
The top four seeds received a bye into the second round.

1. (Czech Republic) Tomáš Berdych (champion)
2. (France) Richard Gasquet (semifinals)
3. (France) Gilles Simon (quarterfinals)
4. (Australia) Bernard Tomic (second round)
5. (Bulgaria) Grigor Dimitrov (quarterfinals)
6. (France) Jérémy Chardy (quarterfinals)
7. (United States) Jack Sock (final)
8. (Luxembourg) Gilles Müller (quarterfinals)

== Draw ==
Key

- Q = Qualifier
- WC = Wild card
- LL = Lucky loser
- Alt = Alternate
- ITF = ITF entry
- PR = Protected ranking
- SR = Special ranking
- SE = Special exempt
- JE = Junior exempt
- JR = Junior Accelerator Programme entrant
- CO = College Accelerator Programme entrant
- NG = Next Gen Accelerator Program entrant
- w/o = Walkover
- r = Retired
- d = Defaulted

=== Finals ===
Semifinals
1/WC	(Czech Republic) Tomáš Berdych	6	0
(Cyprus) Marcos Baghdatis	1	0^{r}
7	(United States) Jack Sock	6	6
2	(France) Richard Gasquet	4	2

Final
1/WC	(Czech Republic) Tomáš Berdych	7^{7}	6
7	(United States) Jack Sock	6^{1}	2

=== Top half ===
First round
(Germany) A Zverev	7^{11}	6^{5}	6
WC	(Sweden) M Ymer	6^{9}	7^{7}	4
LL	(Spain) N Almagro	3	7^{8}	6
WC	(Finland) J Nieminen	6	6^{6}	4
Q	(Serbia) F Krajinović	5	3
5	(Bulgaria) G Dimitrov	7	6
(United States) S Querrey	6^{2}	1
(Cyprus) M Baghdatis	7^{7}	6
(Germany) B Becker	6^{2}	3
(Australia) J Millman	7^{7}	6
Q	(Germany) M Zverev	3	7^{7}	1
8	(Luxembourg) G Müller	6	6^{2}	6

Second round
1/WC	(Czech Republic) T Berdych	6	6
(Germany) A Zverev	3	4
LL	(Spain) N Almagro	2	4
5	(Bulgaria) G Dimitrov	6	6
4	(Australia) B Tomic	6^{7}	3
(Cyprus) M Baghdatis	7^{9}	6
(Australia) J Millman	5	3
8	(Luxembourg) G Müller	7	6

Quarterfinals
1/WC	(Czech Republic) T Berdych	7	6
5	(Bulgaria) G Dimitrov	5	4
(Cyprus) M Baghdatis	7^{7}	4	6
8	(Luxembourg) G Müller	6^{5}	6	3

Semifinals
1/WC	(Czech Republic) T Berdych	6	0
(Cyprus) M Baghdatis	1	0^{r}

=== Bottom half ===
First round
7	(United States) J Sock	6	6^{1}	6
(Spain) P Carreño Busta	3	7^{7}	3
(Spain) F Verdasco	6	6
(United States) D Kudla	4	4
Q	(Germany) M Marterer	7^{7}	2	2
(Argentina) L Mayer	6^{4}	6	6
6	(France) J Chardy	7	4	7
(Australia) T Kokkinakis	5	6	5
(Argentina) F Delbonis	3	6	7
Q	(Croatia) A Pavić	6	3	5
(Belgium) S Darcis	7^{7}	6
(France) A Mannarino	6^{4}	4

Second round
7	(United States) J Sock	7^{7}	6^{5}	6
(Spain) F Verdasco	6^{5}	7^{7}	4
(Argentina) L Mayer	2	4
3	(France) G Simon	6	6
6	(France) J Chardy	6	7^{7}
(Argentina) F Delbonis	3	6^{2}
(Belgium) S Darcis	1	0^{r}
2	(France) R Gasquet	6	2

Quarterfinals
7	(United States) J Sock	7	7^{7}
3	(France) G Simon	5	6^{5}
6	(France) J Chardy	6	3	6^{4}
2	(France) R Gasquet	2	6	7^{7}

Semifinals
7	(United States) J Sock	6	6
2	(France) R Gasquet	4	2

== Qualifying ==
=== Seeds ===
1. (Spain) Nicolás Almagro (qualifying competition, lucky loser)
2. (Serbia) Filip Krajinović (qualified)
3. (Romania) Marius Copil (first round)
4. (Germany) Mischa Zverev (qualified)
5. (Italy) Federico Gaio (qualifying competition)
6. (Hungary) Márton Fucsovics (qualifying competition)
7. (Germany) Maximilian Marterer (qualified)
8. (Switzerland) Adrien Bossel (first round)

=== Qualifiers ===
1. (Germany) Maximilian Marterer
2. (Serbia) Filip Krajinović
3. (Croatia) Ante Pavić
4. (Germany) Mischa Zverev

=== Lucky loser ===
1. (Spain) Nicolás Almagro

=== Qualifying draw ===
==== First qualifier ====
First round
1	(Spain) Nicolás Almagro	6	6
(Ukraine) Vadim Alekseenko	2	2
(Croatia) Mate Pavić	6	7
(Sweden) Fred Simonsson	3	5
(Germany) Peter Torebko	6	6^{4}	6
(Sweden) Isak Arvidsson	4	7^{7}	1
(Australia) Chris Guccione	6^{0}	4
7	(Germany) Maximilian Marterer	7^{7}	6

Second round
1	(Spain) Nicolás Almagro	7	4	6
(Croatia) Mate Pavić	5	6	3
(Germany) Peter Torebko	3	4
7	(Germany) Maximilian Marterer	6	6

Qualifying competition
1	(Spain) Nicolás Almagro	3	4
7	(Germany) Maximilian Marterer	6	6

==== Second qualifier ====
First round
2	(Serbia) Filip Krajinović	7^{7}	6
(Croatia) Filip Veger	6^{4}	3
(Ukraine) Dmytro Badanov	3	2
WC	(Sweden) Carl Söderlund	6	6
(Sweden) Milos Sekulic	7^{7}	6
(Spain) Marc Giner	6^{5}	3
(Spain) Bernabé Zapata Miralles	6	6^{0}	6
8	(Switzerland) Adrien Bossel	4	7^{7}	4

Second round
2	(Serbia) Filip Krajinović	6	6
WC	(Sweden) Carl Söderlund	3	0
(Sweden) Milos Sekulic	6	6
(Spain) Bernabé Zapata Miralles	1	3

Qualifying competition
2	(Serbia) Filip Krajinović	6	6
(Sweden) Milos Sekulic	2	1

==== Third qualifier ====
First round
3	(Romania) Marius Copil	6	3	2
(Netherlands) Jesse Huta Galung	1	6	6
(Croatia) Ante Pavić	6	6
WC	(Sweden) Magnus Eriksson	3	1
(Germany) Philipp Petzschner	6	6
(Sweden) Jacob Adaktusson	3	2
(Sweden) Jonathan Mridha	1	5
5	(Italy) Federico Gaio	6	7

Second round
(Netherlands) Jesse Huta Galung	6^{1}	6^{3}
(Croatia) Ante Pavić	7^{7}	7^{7}
(Germany) Philipp Petzschner	4	2
5	(Italy) Federico Gaio	6	6

Qualifying competition
(Croatia) Ante Pavić	7^{8}	6
5	(Italy) Federico Gaio	6^{6}	4

==== Fourth qualifier ====
First round
4	(Germany) Mischa Zverev	6	6
(Sweden) Christoffer Solberg	2	1
(United Kingdom) Joshua Milton	6^{2}	6^{0}
(New Zealand) Michael Venus	7^{7}	7^{7}
WC	(Sweden) Lucas Renard	4	6^{2}
(Slovakia) Filip Horanský	6	7^{7}
(Sweden) Markus Eriksson	4	4
6	(Hungary) Márton Fucsovics	6	6

Second round
4	(Germany) Mischa Zverev	6	6
(New Zealand) Michael Venus	2	2
(Slovakia) Filip Horanský	2	0
6	(Hungary) Márton Fucsovics	6	6

Qualifying competition
4	(Germany) Mischa Zverev	6	6
6	(Hungary) Márton Fucsovics	4	1
