= 2008 Countrywide Classic – Doubles =

Doubles
- 2008 Countrywide Classic

Final
- Champions: (India) Rohan Bopanna (United States) Eric Butorac
- Runners-up: (United States) Travis Parrott (Serbia) Dušan Vemić
- Score: 7–6^{(7–5)}, 7–6^{(7–5)}

Details
- Draw: 16
- Seeds: 4

Events
Singles	Doubles
← 2007 ·	Los Angeles Open	· 2009 →

Bob Bryan and Mike Bryan were the defending champions, but chose to compete at the Beijing Summer Olympics instead.

Rohan Bopanna and Eric Butorac won in the final 7–6^{(7–5)}, 7–6^{(7–5)}, against Travis Parrott and Dušan Vemić.

== Seeds ==
1. (Argentina) Lucas Arnold Ker / (Brazil) Bruno Soares (first round)
2. (United States) Scott Lipsky / (United States) David Martin (quarterfinals)
3. (France) Marc Gicquel / (Sweden) Robert Lindstedt (first round)
4. (South Africa) Rik de Voest / (United States) Bobby Reynolds (first round)

== Draw ==
=== Key ===
- Q = Qualifier
- WC = Wild card
- LL = Lucky loser
- Alt = Alternate
- SE = Special exempt
- PR = Protected ranking
- ITF = ITF entry
- JE = Junior exempt
- w/o = Walkover
- r = Retired
- d = Defaulted
- SR = Special ranking

=== Draw ===
First round
1	(Argentina) L Arnold Ker (Brazil) B Soares	4	3
(Russia) I Kunitsyn (Russia) M Safin	6	6
(United States) J Cerretani (United States) J Isner	6	6
(France) S Grosjean (France) F Serra	2	4
3	(France) M Gicquel (Sweden) R Lindstedt	4	2
(United States) T Parrott (Serbia) D Vemić	6	6
(Australia) T Perry (Netherlands) R Wassen	0	r
(South Africa) C Haggard (Australia) S Huss	6
WC	(United States) T Phillips (United States) D Young	5	5
(Spain) F López (Spain) F Verdasco	7	7
(Argentina) JM del Potro (Italy) F Fognini	6	6
4	(South Africa) R de Voest (United States) B Reynolds	2	4
WC	(Sweden) J Brunström (Netherlands Antilles) J-J Rojer	3	6	[3]
(India) R Bopanna (United States) E Butorac	6	1	[10]
(Thailand) S Ratiwatana (Thailand) S Ratiwatana	6	4	[5]
2	(United States) S Lipsky (United States) D Martin	1	6	[10]

Quarterfinals
(Russia) I Kunitsyn (Russia) M Safin	7	6
(United States) J Cerretani (United States) J Isner	5	4
(United States) T Parrott (Serbia) D Vemić	6	6
(South Africa) C Haggard (Australia) S Huss	3	4
(Spain) F López (Spain) F Verdasco	6^{4}	6^{2}
(Argentina) JM del Potro (Italy) F Fognini	7^{7}	7^{7}
(India) R Bopanna (United States) E Butorac	6	6
2	(United States) S Lipsky (United States) D Martin	4	4

Semifinals
(Russia) I Kunitsyn (Russia) M Safin	5	4
(United States) T Parrott (Serbia) D Vemić	7	6
(Argentina) JM del Potro (Italy) F Fognini	6^{4}	6	[5]
(India) R Bopanna (United States) E Butorac	7^{7}	4	[10]

Final
(United States) T Parrott (Serbia) D Vemić	6^{5}	6^{5}
(India) R Bopanna (United States) E Butorac	7^{7}	7^{7}
