= 2016 Stockholm Open – Singles =

Singles
- 2016 Stockholm Open

Final
- Champion: (Argentina) Juan Martín del Potro
- Runner-up: (United States) Jack Sock
- Score: 7–5, 6–1

Details
- Draw: 28
- Seeds: 8

Events
Singles	Doubles
- Stockholm Open

Tomáš Berdych was the two-time defending champion, but chose not to participate this year.

Juan Martín del Potro won the title, defeating Jack Sock in the final, 7–5, 6–1.

== Seeds ==
The top four seeds receive a bye into the second round.

1. (France) Gaël Monfils (second round)
2. (Bulgaria) Grigor Dimitrov (semifinals)
3. (Croatia) Ivo Karlović (quarterfinals)
4. (Germany) Alexander Zverev (semifinals)
5. (United States) Steve Johnson (first round)
6. (United States) Jack Sock (final)
7. (United States) John Isner (first round)
8. (Cyprus) Marcos Baghdatis (first round)

== Draw ==
Key

- Q = Qualifier
- WC = Wild card
- LL = Lucky loser
- Alt = Alternate
- ITF = ITF entry
- PR = Protected ranking
- SR = Special ranking
- SE = Special exempt
- JE = Junior exempt
- JR = Junior Accelerator Programme entrant
- CO = College Accelerator Programme entrant
- NG = Next Gen Accelerator Program entrant
- w/o = Walkover
- r = Retired
- d = Defaulted

=== Finals ===
Semifinals
6	(United States) Jack Sock	6^{4}	7^{7}	6
4	(Germany) Alexander Zverev	7^{7}	6^{4}	4
WC	(Argentina) Juan Martín del Potro	6	7
2	(Bulgaria) Grigor Dimitrov	4	5

Final
6	(United States) Jack Sock	5	1
WC	(Argentina) Juan Martín del Potro	7	6

=== Top half ===
First round
(Portugal) G Elias	6	6
(Croatia) I Dodig	2	1
(Luxembourg) G Müller	6	3	3
(Germany) D Brown	4	6	6
(Tunisia) M Jaziri	6	3	6^{5}
6	(United States) J Sock	3	6	7^{7}
(United States) D Young	5	4
(France) A Mannarino	7	6
Q	(Germany) T Kamke	6	6
WC	(Sweden) E Ymer	4	0
(Moldova) R Albot	6	6
5	(United States) S Johnson	3	4

Second round
1	(France) G Monfils	6^{4}	1
(Portugal) G Elias	7^{7}	6
(Germany) D Brown	6^{5}	6	4
6	(United States) J Sock	7^{7}	4	6
4	(Germany) A Zverev	7	6
(France) A Mannarino	5	4
Q	(Germany) T Kamke	7^{10}	6
(Moldova) R Albot	6^{8}	3

Quarterfinals
(Portugal) G Elias	4	4
6	(United States) J Sock	6	6
4	(Germany) A Zverev	6	7^{7}
Q	(Germany) T Kamke	3	6^{5}

Semifinals
6	(United States) J Sock	6^{4}	7^{7}	6
4	(Germany) A Zverev	7^{7}	6^{4}	4

=== Bottom half ===
First round
7	(United States) J Isner	4	6^{6}
WC	(Argentina) JM del Potro	6	7^{8}
(Japan) Y Sugita	6	6^{1}	3
(Spain) N Almagro	3	7^{7}	6
WC	(Sweden) M Ymer	6	6
(Spain) F Verdasco	2	1
8	(Cyprus) M Baghdatis	6	4	2
(South Africa) K Anderson	2	6	6
Q	(Czech Republic) A Pavlásek	3	5
Q	(United States) R Harrison	6	7
(Germany) B Becker	3	4
Q	(Estonia) J Zopp	6	6

Second round
WC	(Argentina) JM del Potro	6	6
(Spain) N Almagro	4	3
WC	(Sweden) M Ymer	6	4	4
3	(Croatia) I Karlović	4	6	6
(South Africa) K Anderson	7^{10}	6
Q	(United States) R Harrison	6^{8}	4
Q	(Estonia) J Zopp	3	2
2	(Bulgaria) G Dimitrov	6	6

Quarterfinals
WC	(Argentina) JM del Potro	6	6
3	(Croatia) I Karlović	3	4
(South Africa) K Anderson	6^{3}	7	2
2	(Bulgaria) G Dimitrov	7^{7}	5	6

Semifinals
WC	(Argentina) JM del Potro	6	7
2	(Bulgaria) G Dimitrov	4	5

== Qualifying ==
=== Seeds ===
1. (United States) Sam Querrey (first round)
2. (Czech Republic) Adam Pavlásek (qualified)
3. (United States) Ryan Harrison (qualified)
4. (Germany) Tobias Kamke (qualified)
5. (Germany) Daniel Brands (qualifying competition)
6. (Hungary) Márton Fucsovics (qualifying competition)
7. (Italy) Marco Cecchinato (first round)
8. (France) Tristan Lamasine (first round)

=== Qualifiers ===
1. (Estonia) Jürgen Zopp
2. (Czech Republic) Adam Pavlásek
3. (United States) Ryan Harrison
4. (Germany) Tobias Kamke

=== Qualifying draw ===
==== First qualifier ====
First round
1	(United States) Sam Querrey	3	3
(Estonia) Jürgen Zopp	6	6
WC	(Sweden) Patrik Rosenholm	6	6
8	(France) Tristan Lamasine	4	3

Qualifying competition
(Estonia) Jürgen Zopp	7	6
WC	(Sweden) Patrik Rosenholm	5	4

==== Second qualifier ====
First round
2	(Czech Republic) Adam Pavlásek	6	6
WC	(Sweden) Carl Söderlund	3	2
(Israel) Amir Weintraub	3	1
6	(Hungary) Márton Fucsovics	6	6

Qualifying competition
2	(Czech Republic) Adam Pavlásek	6	6
6	(Hungary) Márton Fucsovics	4	3

==== Third qualifier ====
First round
3	(United States) Ryan Harrison	6	6
(Russia) Ivan Nedelko	4	3
PR	(Germany) Matthias Bachinger	7^{7}	6
7	(Italy) Marco Cecchinato	6^{1}	2

Qualifying competition
3	(United States) Ryan Harrison	7^{7}	6
PR	(Germany) Matthias Bachinger	6^{4}	2

==== Fourth qualifier ====
First round
4	(Germany) Tobias Kamke	6	6
(Romania) Dragoș Dima	3	2
(Czech Republic) Michal Konečný	3	3
5	(Germany) Daniel Brands	6	6

Qualifying competition
4	(Germany) Tobias Kamke	6	6
5	(Germany) Daniel Brands	3	2
