= 2008 Countrywide Classic – Singles =

Coordinates: 34.070075°N 118.447991°W

Singles
- 2008 Countrywide Classic

Final
- Champion: (Argentina) Juan Martín del Potro
- Runner-up: (United States) Andy Roddick
- Score: 6–1, 7–6^{(7–2)}

Details
- Draw: 28 (4 Q / 3 WC )
- Seeds: 8

Events
Singles	Doubles
- Los Angeles Open

Radek Štěpánek was the defending champion, but chose to compete in the Beijing Summer Olympics instead.

Third-seeded Juan Martín del Potro won in the final 6–1, 7–6^{(7–2)}, against Andy Roddick.

== Seeds ==
The top four seeds receive a bye into the second round.

1. (United States) Andy Roddick (final)
2. (Spain) Fernando Verdasco (second round)
3. (Argentina) Juan Martín del Potro (champion)
4. (Spain) Feliciano López (second round)
5. (Russia) Marat Safin (quarterfinals)
6. (United States) Mardy Fish (semifinals)
7. (Spain) Carlos Moyá (second round)
8. (Germany) Tommy Haas (first round)

== Draw ==
Key

- Q = Qualifier
- WC = Wild card
- LL = Lucky loser
- Alt = Alternate
- ITF = ITF entry
- PR = Protected ranking
- SR = Special ranking
- SE = Special exempt
- JE = Junior exempt
- JR = Junior Accelerator Programme entrant
- CO = College Accelerator Programme entrant
- NG = Next Gen Accelerator Program entrant
- w/o = Walkover
- r = Retired
- d = Defaulted

=== Finals ===
Semifinals
1	(United States) Andy Roddick	6	6
(Germany) Denis Gremelmayr	2	2
3	(Argentina) Juan Martín del Potro	6	6
6	(United States) Mardy Fish	2	1

Final
1	(United States) Andy Roddick	1	6^{2}
3	(Argentina) Juan Martín del Potro	6	7^{7}

=== Top half ===
First round
LL	(Serbia) D Vemic	3	7^{7}	6
Q	(United States) S Warburg	6	6^{5}	4
WC	(United States) Z Fleishman	3	0
(France) M Gicquel	6	6
(United States) D Young	6	6
8	(Germany) T Haas	2	4
(Germany) D Gremelmayr	6	6
(Italy) F Fognini	4	2
(United States) W Odesnik	4	6	6
(United States) B Reynolds	6	1	4
(United States) J Isner	3	4
5	(Russia) M Safin	6	6

Second round
1	(United States) A Roddick	6	6
LL	(Serbia) D Vemic	2	2
(France) M Gicquel	6	6
(United States) D Young	3	3
4	(Spain) F López	5	5
(Germany) D Gremelmayr	7	7
(United States) W Odesnik	3	2
5	(Russia) M Safin	6	6

Quarterfinals
1	(United States) A Roddick	6	6
(France) M Gicquel	3	1
(Germany) D Gremelmayr	3	6	6
5	(Russia) M Safin	6	3	2

Semifinals
1	(United States) A Roddick	6	6
(Germany) D Gremelmayr	2	2

=== Bottom half ===
First round
7	(Spain) C Moyá	6	1	7^{7}
WC	(Belgium) X Malisse	2	6	6^{5}
Q	(United States) A Delić	6	6
(Israel) D Sela	4	4
(Russia) I Kunitsyn	1	3
Q	(Italy) A Stoppini	6	6
6	(United States) M Fish	6	6
(Colombia) A Falla	2	2
(United States) V Spadea	6	3	6
(France) S Grosjean	3	6	3
Q	(Kazakhstan) A Golubev	4	1
(France) F Serra	6	6

Second round
7	(Spain) C Moyá	2	7^{7}	6^{5}
Q	(United States) A Delić	6	6^{5}	7^{7}
Q	(Italy) A Stoppini	4	2
3	(Argentina) JM del Potro	6	6
6	(United States) M Fish	6^{5}	6	6
(United States) V Spadea	7^{7}	1	0
(France) F Serra	6	7^{7}
2/WC	(Spain) F Verdasco	2	6^{4}

Quarterfinals
Q	(United States) A Delić	6^{6}	2
3	(Argentina) JM del Potro	7^{8}	6
6	(United States) M Fish	6	6
(France) F Serra	4	4

Semifinals
3	(Argentina) JM del Potro	6	6
6	(United States) M Fish	2	1
