= 2016 WTA Tour =

Women's tennis circuit

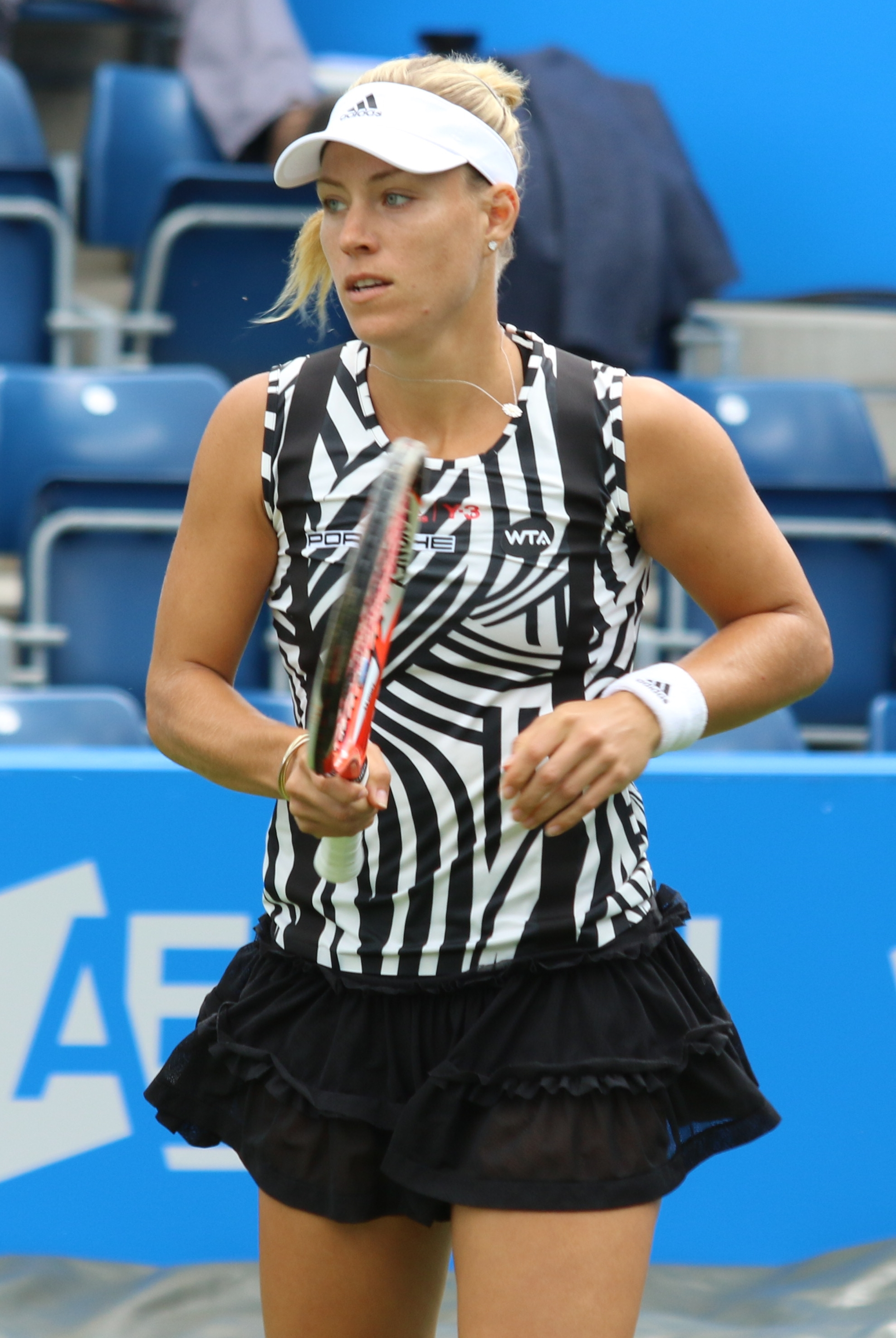
- Angelique Kerber finished the year as world No. 1 for the only time in her career. She won three singles tournaments during the season, including two majors at the Australian Open and the US Open. She also finished runner-up at another major, the Wimbledon Championships, and won a silver medal at the Rio Olympics.

Details
- Duration: 3 January – 6 November 2016
- Edition: 46th
- Tournaments: 61
- Categories: Grand Slam (4); WTA Finals; Summer Olympics; WTA Premier Mandatory (4); WTA Premier 5 (5); WTA Premier (12); WTA International (33); WTA Elite Trophy

Achievements (singles)
- Most titles: (Slovakia) Dominika Cibulková (4)
- Most finals: (Germany) Angelique Kerber (8)
- Prize money leader: (Germany) Angelique Kerber (US$10,136,615)
- Points leader: (Germany) Angelique Kerber (9,080)

Awards
- Player of the year: (Germany) Angelique Kerber
- Doubles team of the year: (France) Caroline Garcia (France) Kristina Mladenovic
- Most improved player of the year: (United Kingdom) Johanna Konta
- Newcomer of the year: (Japan) Naomi Osaka
- Comeback player of the year: (Slovakia) Dominika Cibulková

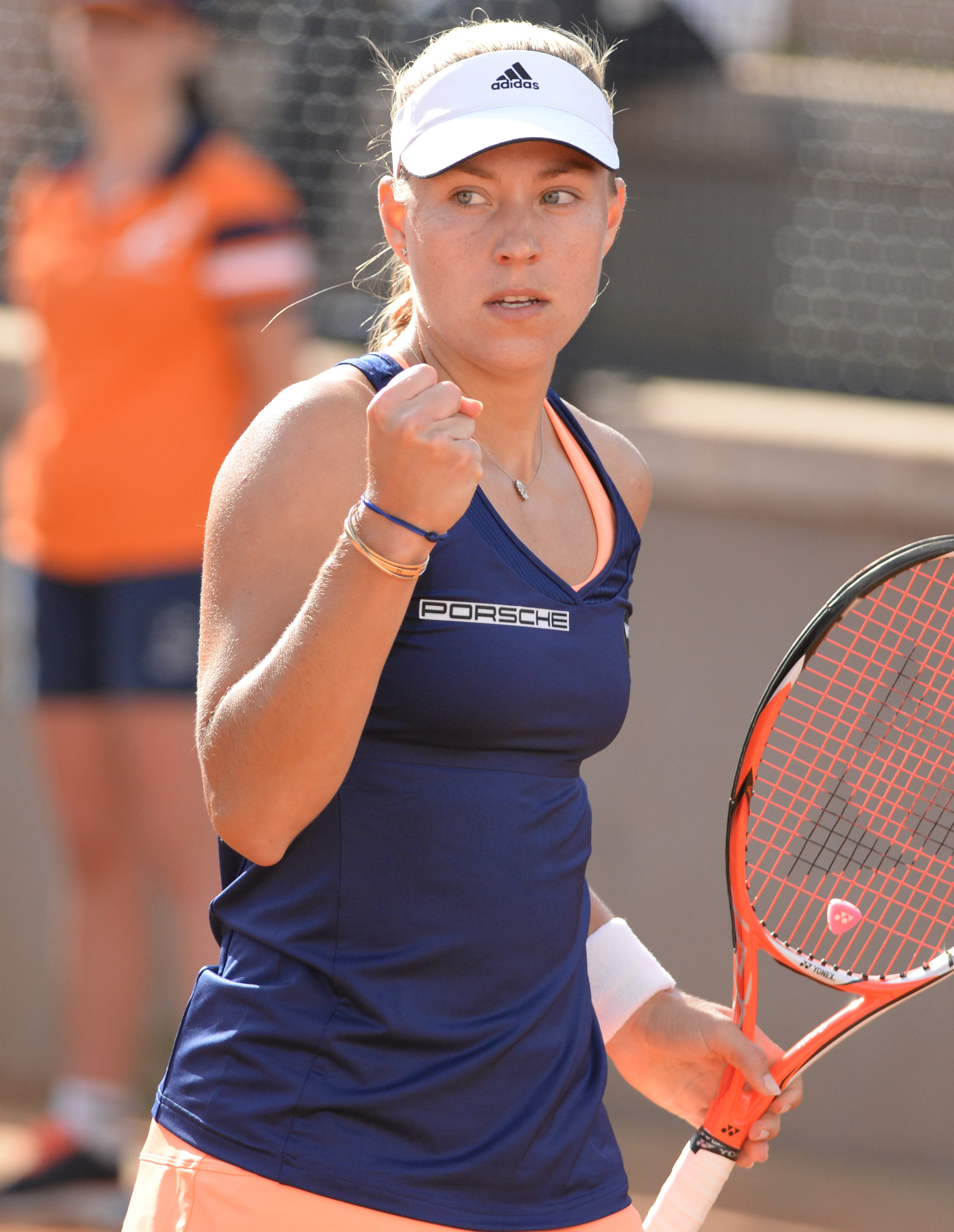
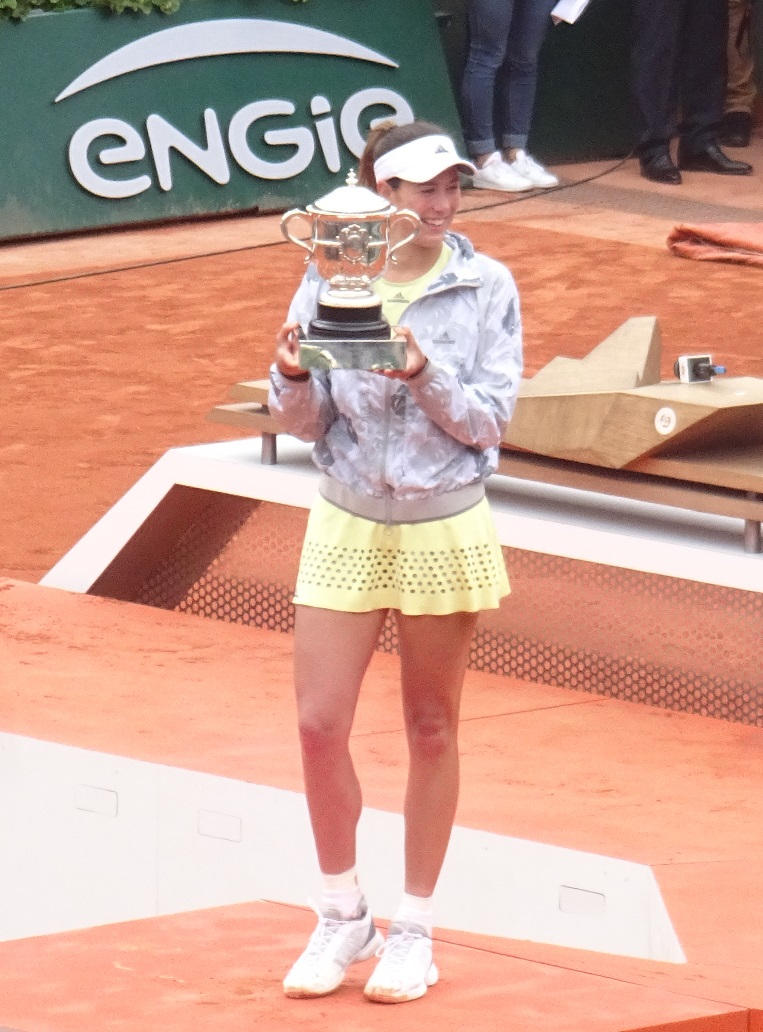
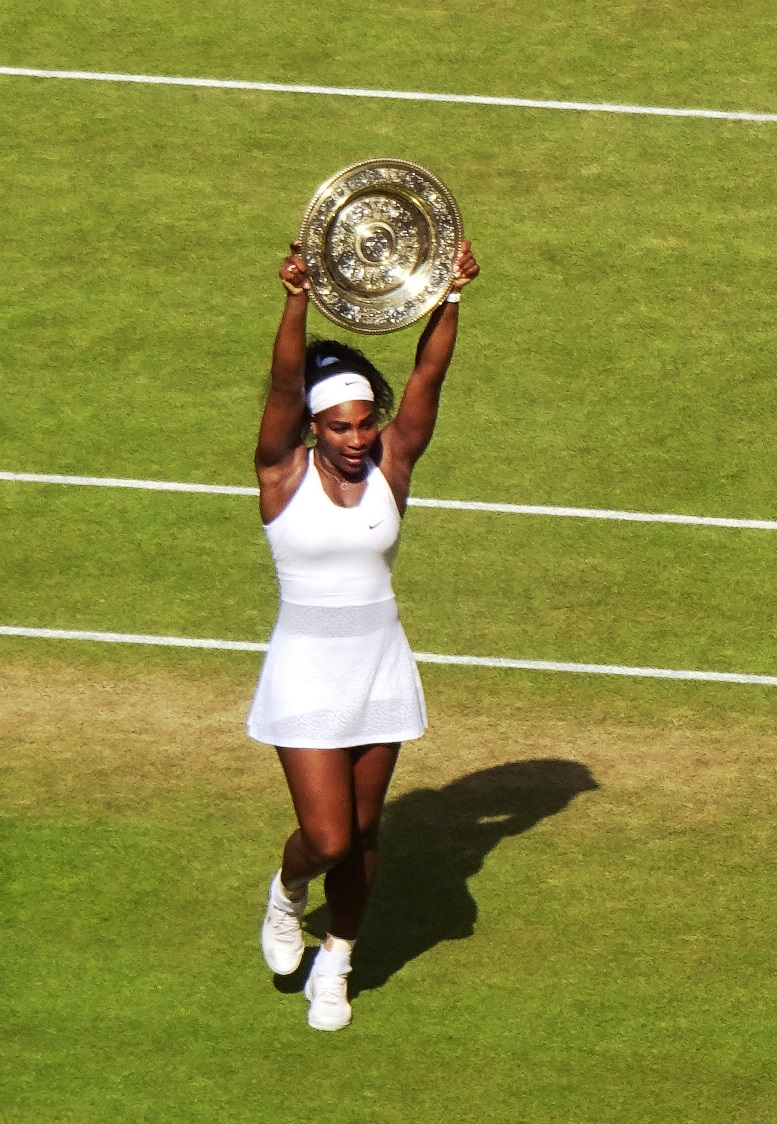
Angelique Kerber won her first Grand Slam title at the Australian Open, thus becoming the first German to win a Grand Slam title since Steffi Graf at the 1999 French Open defeating World No. 1 Serena Williams in the final. Kerber would go on to win the 2016 US Open, defeating Karolína Plíšková in the final, thus would attain her World No. 1 ranking. Garbiñe Muguruza won her first Grand Slam title at the French Open, thus becoming the first Spaniard to win a Grand Slam title since Arantxa Sánchez Vicario at the 1998 French Open by defeating Williams in the final. Williams herself would go on to reach the season's third Grand Slam finals and defeat Kerber in the final at Wimbledon to claim her 22nd Grand Slam title, equaling Steffi Graf's record for most Grand Slam titles in the Open Era.

The 2016 WTA Tour was the elite professional tennis circuit organised by the Women's Tennis Association (WTA) for the 2016 tennis season. The 2016 WTA Tour calendar comprises the Grand Slam tournaments (supervised by the International Tennis Federation (ITF), the WTA Premier tournaments (Premier Mandatory, Premier 5, and regular Premier), the WTA International tournaments, the Fed Cup (organized by the ITF), the year-end championships (the WTA Tour Championships and the WTA Elite Trophy). Also included in the 2016 calendar is the Summer Olympic Games and Hopman Cup, which were organized by the ITF and did not distribute ranking points.

== Schedule ==
This is the complete schedule of events on the 2016 calendar, with player progression documented from the quarterfinals stage.

Key

Grand Slam tournaments
Summer Olympic Games
Year-end championships
WTA Premier Mandatory
WTA Premier 5
WTA Premier
WTA International
Team events

Note: In the Champions and Runners-up columns, a tournament's results in doubles are also included.

=== January ===
Week	Tournament	Champions	Runners-up	Semifinalists	Quarterfinalists
4 Jan	Hopman Cup; Perth, Australia; ITF Mixed Teams Championships; Hard (i) – $1,000,000 – 8 teams (RR)	Australia Green; 2–0	Ukraine	Round robin (Group A) Czech Republic; Australia Gold; United States	Round robin (Group B) Great Britain; Germany; France
4 Jan	Brisbane International; Brisbane, Australia; WTA Premier; Hard – $1,000,000 – 30S/32Q/16D; Singles – Doubles	(Belarus) Victoria Azarenka; 6–3, 6–1	(Germany) Angelique Kerber	(United States) Samantha Crawford (Spain) Carla Suárez Navarro	(Italy) Roberta Vinci (Germany) Andrea Petkovic (Russia) Anastasia Pavlyuchenkova (United States) Varvara Lepchenko
4 Jan	Brisbane International; Brisbane, Australia; WTA Premier; Hard – $1,000,000 – 30S/32Q/16D; Singles – Doubles	(Switzerland) Martina Hingis (India) Sania Mirza; 7–5, 6–1	(Germany) Angelique Kerber (Germany) Andrea Petkovic	(United States) Samantha Crawford (Spain) Carla Suárez Navarro	(Italy) Roberta Vinci (Germany) Andrea Petkovic (Russia) Anastasia Pavlyuchenkova (United States) Varvara Lepchenko
4 Jan	Shenzhen Open; Shenzhen, China; WTA International; Hard – $500,000 – 32S/16Q/16D; Singles – Doubles	(Poland) Agnieszka Radwańska; 6–3, 6–2	(United States) Alison Riske	(Germany) Anna-Lena Friedsam (Hungary) Tímea Babos	(China) Wang Qiang (Czech Republic) Kateřina Siniaková (Canada) Eugenie Bouchard (Estonia) Anett Kontaveit
4 Jan	Shenzhen Open; Shenzhen, China; WTA International; Hard – $500,000 – 32S/16Q/16D; Singles – Doubles	(United States) Vania King (Romania) Monica Niculescu; 6–1, 6–4	(China) Xu Yifan (China) Zheng Saisai	(Germany) Anna-Lena Friedsam (Hungary) Tímea Babos	(China) Wang Qiang (Czech Republic) Kateřina Siniaková (Canada) Eugenie Bouchard (Estonia) Anett Kontaveit
4 Jan	Auckland Open; Auckland, New Zealand; WTA International; Hard – $250,000 – 32S/32Q/16D; Singles – Doubles	(United States) Sloane Stephens; 7–5, 6–2	(Germany) Julia Görges	(Austria) Tamira Paszek (Denmark) Caroline Wozniacki	(Japan) Nao Hibino (Belgium) Kirsten Flipkens (Romania) Alexandra Dulgheru (United Kingdom) Naomi Broady
4 Jan	Auckland Open; Auckland, New Zealand; WTA International; Hard – $250,000 – 32S/32Q/16D; Singles – Doubles	(Belgium) Elise Mertens (Belgium) An-Sophie Mestach; 2–6, 6–3, [10–5]	(Montenegro) Danka Kovinić (Czech Republic) Barbora Strýcová	(Austria) Tamira Paszek (Denmark) Caroline Wozniacki	(Japan) Nao Hibino (Belgium) Kirsten Flipkens (Romania) Alexandra Dulgheru (United Kingdom) Naomi Broady
11 Jan	Sydney International; Sydney, Australia; WTA Premier; Hard – $753,000 – 30S/32Q/16D; Singles – Doubles	(Russia) Svetlana Kuznetsova; 6–0, 6–2	(Puerto Rico) Monica Puig	(Romania) Simona Halep (Switzerland) Belinda Bencic	(Czech Republic) Karolína Plíšková (Italy) Sara Errani (Russia) Ekaterina Makarova (Australia) Samantha Stosur
11 Jan	Sydney International; Sydney, Australia; WTA Premier; Hard – $753,000 – 30S/32Q/16D; Singles – Doubles	(Switzerland) Martina Hingis (India) Sania Mirza; 1–6, 7–5, [10–5]	(France) Caroline Garcia (France) Kristina Mladenovic	(Romania) Simona Halep (Switzerland) Belinda Bencic	(Czech Republic) Karolína Plíšková (Italy) Sara Errani (Russia) Ekaterina Makarova (Australia) Samantha Stosur
11 Jan	Hobart International; Hobart, Australia; WTA International; Hard – $250,000 – 32S/32Q/16D; Singles – Doubles	(France) Alizé Cornet; 6–1, 6–2	(Canada) Eugenie Bouchard	(Sweden) Johanna Larsson (Slovakia) Dominika Cibulková	(Germany) Mona Barthel (United Kingdom) Heather Watson (Netherlands) Kiki Bertens (Italy) Camila Giorgi
11 Jan	Hobart International; Hobart, Australia; WTA International; Hard – $250,000 – 32S/32Q/16D; Singles – Doubles	(China) Han Xinyun (United States) Christina McHale; 6–3, 6–0	(Australia) Kimberly Birrell (Australia) Jarmila Wolfe	(Sweden) Johanna Larsson (Slovakia) Dominika Cibulková	(Germany) Mona Barthel (United Kingdom) Heather Watson (Netherlands) Kiki Bertens (Italy) Camila Giorgi
18 Jan; 25 Jan	Australian Open; Melbourne, Australia; Grand Slam; Hard – $14,835,728; 128S/96Q/64D/32X; Singles – Doubles – Mixed	(Germany) Angelique Kerber; 6–4, 3–6, 6–4	(United States) Serena Williams	(Poland) Agnieszka Radwańska (United Kingdom) Johanna Konta	(Russia) Maria Sharapova (Spain) Carla Suárez Navarro (Belarus) Victoria Azarenka (China) Zhang Shuai
18 Jan; 25 Jan	Australian Open; Melbourne, Australia; Grand Slam; Hard – $14,835,728; 128S/96Q/64D/32X; Singles – Doubles – Mixed	(Switzerland) Martina Hingis (India) Sania Mirza; 7–6^{(7–1)}, 6–3	(Czech Republic) Andrea Hlaváčková (Czech Republic) Lucie Hradecká	(Poland) Agnieszka Radwańska (United Kingdom) Johanna Konta	(Russia) Maria Sharapova (Spain) Carla Suárez Navarro (Belarus) Victoria Azarenka (China) Zhang Shuai
18 Jan; 25 Jan	Australian Open; Melbourne, Australia; Grand Slam; Hard – $14,835,728; 128S/96Q/64D/32X; Singles – Doubles – Mixed	(Russia) Elena Vesnina (Brazil) Bruno Soares; 6–4, 4–6, [10–5]	(United States) CoCo Vandeweghe (Romania) Horia Tecău	(Poland) Agnieszka Radwańska (United Kingdom) Johanna Konta	(Russia) Maria Sharapova (Spain) Carla Suárez Navarro (Belarus) Victoria Azarenka (China) Zhang Shuai

=== February ===
Week	Tournament	Champions	Runners-up	Semifinalists	Quarterfinalists
1 Feb	Fed Cup Quarterfinals; Cluj-Napoca, Romania – hard (i); Leipzig, Germany – hard (i); Marseille, France – hard (i); Moscow, Russia – hard (i)	Quarterfinals winners Czech Republic 3–2; Switzerland 3–2; France 4–1; Netherlands 3–1	Quarterfinals losers Romania; Germany; Italy; Russia		
8 Feb	St. Petersburg Ladies Trophy; Saint Petersburg, Russia; WTA Premier; Hard (i) – $753,000 – 28S/32Q/16D; Singles – Doubles	(Italy) Roberta Vinci; 6–4, 6–3	(Switzerland) Belinda Bencic	(Russia) Daria Kasatkina (Serbia) Ana Ivanovic	(Russia) Anastasia Pavlyuchenkova (Slovakia) Dominika Cibulková (Ukraine) Kateryna Kozlova (Hungary) Tímea Babos
8 Feb	St. Petersburg Ladies Trophy; Saint Petersburg, Russia; WTA Premier; Hard (i) – $753,000 – 28S/32Q/16D; Singles – Doubles	(Switzerland) Martina Hingis (India) Sania Mirza; 6–3, 6–1	(Russia) Vera Dushevina (Czech Republic) Barbora Krejčíková	(Russia) Daria Kasatkina (Serbia) Ana Ivanovic	(Russia) Anastasia Pavlyuchenkova (Slovakia) Dominika Cibulková (Ukraine) Kateryna Kozlova (Hungary) Tímea Babos
8 Feb	Taiwan Open; Kaohsiung, Taiwan; WTA International; Hard – $500,000 – 32S/24Q/16D; Singles – Doubles	(United States) Venus Williams; 6–4, 6–2	(Japan) Misaki Doi	(Kazakhstan) Yulia Putintseva (Chinese Taipei) Hsieh Su-wei	(Latvia) Anastasija Sevastova (Switzerland) Stefanie Vögele (Russia) Elizaveta Kulichkova (Japan) Kurumi Nara
8 Feb	Taiwan Open; Kaohsiung, Taiwan; WTA International; Hard – $500,000 – 32S/24Q/16D; Singles – Doubles	(Chinese Taipei) Chan Hao-ching (Chinese Taipei) Chan Yung-jan; 6–4, 6–3	(Japan) Eri Hozumi (Japan) Miyu Kato	(Kazakhstan) Yulia Putintseva (Chinese Taipei) Hsieh Su-wei	(Latvia) Anastasija Sevastova (Switzerland) Stefanie Vögele (Russia) Elizaveta Kulichkova (Japan) Kurumi Nara
15 Feb	Dubai Tennis Championships; Dubai, United Arab Emirates; WTA Premier; Hard – $2,000,000 – 28S/32Q/16D; Singles – Doubles	(Italy) Sara Errani; 6–0, 6–2	(Czech Republic) Barbora Strýcová	(France) Caroline Garcia (Ukraine) Elina Svitolina	(Serbia) Ana Ivanovic (Germany) Andrea Petkovic (United States) Madison Brengle (United States) CoCo Vandeweghe
15 Feb	Dubai Tennis Championships; Dubai, United Arab Emirates; WTA Premier; Hard – $2,000,000 – 28S/32Q/16D; Singles – Doubles	(Chinese Taipei) Chuang Chia-jung (Croatia) Darija Jurak; 6–4, 6–4	(France) Caroline Garcia (France) Kristina Mladenovic	(France) Caroline Garcia (Ukraine) Elina Svitolina	(Serbia) Ana Ivanovic (Germany) Andrea Petkovic (United States) Madison Brengle (United States) CoCo Vandeweghe
15 Feb	Rio Open; Rio de Janeiro, Brazil; WTA International; Clay (red) – $250,000 – 32S/24Q/16D; Singles – Doubles	(Italy) Francesca Schiavone; 2–6, 6–2, 6–2	(United States) Shelby Rogers	(Croatia) Petra Martić (Romania) Sorana Cîrstea	(Spain) Lara Arruabarrena (Netherlands) Cindy Burger (Montenegro) Danka Kovinić (Brazil) Paula Cristina Gonçalves
15 Feb	Rio Open; Rio de Janeiro, Brazil; WTA International; Clay (red) – $250,000 – 32S/24Q/16D; Singles – Doubles	(Paraguay) Verónica Cepede Royg (Argentina) María Irigoyen; 6–1, 7–6^{(7–5)}	(United Kingdom) Tara Moore (Switzerland) Conny Perrin	(Croatia) Petra Martić (Romania) Sorana Cîrstea	(Spain) Lara Arruabarrena (Netherlands) Cindy Burger (Montenegro) Danka Kovinić (Brazil) Paula Cristina Gonçalves
22 Feb	Qatar Open; Doha, Qatar; WTA Premier 5 Hard – $2,818,000 – 56S/32Q/28D; Singles – Doubles	(Spain) Carla Suárez Navarro; 1–6, 6–4, 6–4	(Latvia) Jeļena Ostapenko	(Germany) Andrea Petkovic (Poland) Agnieszka Radwańska	(China) Zheng Saisai (Spain) Garbiñe Muguruza (Italy) Roberta Vinci (Russia) Elena Vesnina
22 Feb	Qatar Open; Doha, Qatar; WTA Premier 5 Hard – $2,818,000 – 56S/32Q/28D; Singles – Doubles	(Chinese Taipei) Chan Hao-ching (Chinese Taipei) Chan Yung-jan; 6–3, 6–3	(Italy) Sara Errani (Spain) Carla Suárez Navarro	(Germany) Andrea Petkovic (Poland) Agnieszka Radwańska	(China) Zheng Saisai (Spain) Garbiñe Muguruza (Italy) Roberta Vinci (Russia) Elena Vesnina
22 Feb	Mexican Open; Acapulco, Mexico; WTA International; Hard – $250,000 – 32S/24Q/16D; Singles – Doubles	(United States) Sloane Stephens; 6–4, 4–6, 7–6^{(7–5)}	(Slovakia) Dominika Cibulková	(United States) Christina McHale (Belgium) Yanina Wickmayer	(Sweden) Johanna Larsson (Croatia) Mirjana Lučić-Baroni (Russia) Anastasia Pavlyuchenkova (Japan) Naomi Osaka
22 Feb	Mexican Open; Acapulco, Mexico; WTA International; Hard – $250,000 – 32S/24Q/16D; Singles – Doubles	(Spain) Anabel Medina Garrigues (Spain) Arantxa Parra Santonja; 6–0, 6–4	(Netherlands) Kiki Bertens (Sweden) Johanna Larsson	(United States) Christina McHale (Belgium) Yanina Wickmayer	(Sweden) Johanna Larsson (Croatia) Mirjana Lučić-Baroni (Russia) Anastasia Pavlyuchenkova (Japan) Naomi Osaka
29 Feb	Monterrey Open; Monterrey, Mexico; WTA International; Hard – $250,000 – 32S/32Q/16D; Singles – Doubles	(United Kingdom) Heather Watson; 3–6, 6–2, 6–3	(Belgium) Kirsten Flipkens	(Estonia) Anett Kontaveit (France) Caroline Garcia	(United States) Nicole Gibbs (United Kingdom) Johanna Konta (France) Pauline Parmentier (Denmark) Caroline Wozniacki
29 Feb	Monterrey Open; Monterrey, Mexico; WTA International; Hard – $250,000 – 32S/32Q/16D; Singles – Doubles	(Spain) Anabel Medina Garrigues (Spain) Arantxa Parra Santonja; 4–6, 7–5, [10–7]	(Croatia) Petra Martić (United States) Maria Sanchez	(Estonia) Anett Kontaveit (France) Caroline Garcia	(United States) Nicole Gibbs (United Kingdom) Johanna Konta (France) Pauline Parmentier (Denmark) Caroline Wozniacki
29 Feb	Malaysian Open; Kuala Lumpur, Malaysia; WTA International; Hard – $250,000 – 32S/24Q/16D; Singles – Doubles	(Ukraine) Elina Svitolina; 6–7^{(5–7)}, 6–4, 7–5	(Canada) Eugenie Bouchard	(United Kingdom) Naomi Broady (China) Zhu Lin	(Turkey) Çağla Büyükakçay (Germany) Sabine Lisicki (China) Wang Qiang (Slovakia) Kristína Kučová
29 Feb	Malaysian Open; Kuala Lumpur, Malaysia; WTA International; Hard – $250,000 – 32S/24Q/16D; Singles – Doubles	(Thailand) Varatchaya Wongteanchai (China) Yang Zhaoxuan; 4–6, 6–4, [10–7]	(China) Liang Chen (China) Wang Yafan	(United Kingdom) Naomi Broady (China) Zhu Lin	(Turkey) Çağla Büyükakçay (Germany) Sabine Lisicki (China) Wang Qiang (Slovakia) Kristína Kučová

=== March ===
Week	Tournament	Champions	Runners-up	Semifinalists	Quarterfinalists
7 Mar; 14 Mar	Indian Wells Open; Indian Wells, United States; WTA Premier Mandatory; Hard – $6,844,139 – 96S/48Q/32D; Singles – Doubles	(Belarus) Victoria Azarenka; 6–4, 6–4	(United States) Serena Williams	(Poland) Agnieszka Radwańska (Czech Republic) Karolína Plíšková	(Romania) Simona Halep (Czech Republic) Petra Kvitová (Slovakia) Magdaléna Rybáriková (Russia) Daria Kasatkina
7 Mar; 14 Mar	Indian Wells Open; Indian Wells, United States; WTA Premier Mandatory; Hard – $6,844,139 – 96S/48Q/32D; Singles – Doubles	(United States) Bethanie Mattek-Sands (United States) CoCo Vandeweghe; 4–6, 6–4, [10–6]	(Germany) Julia Görges (Czech Republic) Karolína Plíšková	(Poland) Agnieszka Radwańska (Czech Republic) Karolína Plíšková	(Romania) Simona Halep (Czech Republic) Petra Kvitová (Slovakia) Magdaléna Rybáriková (Russia) Daria Kasatkina
21 Mar; 28 Mar	Miami Open; Key Biscayne, United States; WTA Premier Mandatory; Hard – $6,844,139 – 96S/48Q/32D; Singles – Doubles	(Belarus) Victoria Azarenka; 6–3, 6–2	(Russia) Svetlana Kuznetsova	(Switzerland) Timea Bacsinszky (Germany) Angelique Kerber	(Russia) Ekaterina Makarova (Romania) Simona Halep (United Kingdom) Johanna Konta (United States) Madison Keys
21 Mar; 28 Mar	Miami Open; Key Biscayne, United States; WTA Premier Mandatory; Hard – $6,844,139 – 96S/48Q/32D; Singles – Doubles	(United States) Bethanie Mattek-Sands (Czech Republic) Lucie Šafářová; 6–3, 6–4	(Hungary) Tímea Babos (Kazakhstan) Yaroslava Shvedova	(Switzerland) Timea Bacsinszky (Germany) Angelique Kerber	(Russia) Ekaterina Makarova (Romania) Simona Halep (United Kingdom) Johanna Konta (United States) Madison Keys

=== April ===
Week	Tournament	Champions	Runners-up	Semifinalists	Quarterfinalists
4 Apr	Charleston Open; Charleston, United States; WTA Premier; Clay – $753,000 (Green) – 56S/32Q/16D; Singles – Doubles	(United States) Sloane Stephens; 7–6^{(7–4)}, 6–2	(Russia) Elena Vesnina	(Germany) Angelique Kerber (Italy) Sara Errani	(Romania) Irina-Camelia Begu (Russia) Daria Kasatkina (Kazakhstan) Yulia Putintseva (Germany) Laura Siegemund
4 Apr	Charleston Open; Charleston, United States; WTA Premier; Clay – $753,000 (Green) – 56S/32Q/16D; Singles – Doubles	(France) Caroline Garcia (France) Kristina Mladenovic; 6–2, 7–5	(United States) Bethanie Mattek-Sands (Czech Republic) Lucie Šafářová	(Germany) Angelique Kerber (Italy) Sara Errani	(Romania) Irina-Camelia Begu (Russia) Daria Kasatkina (Kazakhstan) Yulia Putintseva (Germany) Laura Siegemund
4 Apr	Katowice Open; Katowice, Poland; WTA International; Hard (i) – $250,000 – 32S/32Q/16D; Singles – Doubles	(Slovakia) Dominika Cibulková; 6–4, 6–0	(Italy) Camila Giorgi	(Latvia) Jeļena Ostapenko (France) Pauline Parmentier	(Hungary) Tímea Babos (Belgium) Kirsten Flipkens (Italy) Francesca Schiavone (Poland) Magda Linette
4 Apr	Katowice Open; Katowice, Poland; WTA International; Hard (i) – $250,000 – 32S/32Q/16D; Singles – Doubles	(Japan) Eri Hozumi (Japan) Miyu Kato; 3–6, 7–5, [10–8]	(Russia) Valentyna Ivakhnenko (Russia) Marina Melnikova	(Latvia) Jeļena Ostapenko (France) Pauline Parmentier	(Hungary) Tímea Babos (Belgium) Kirsten Flipkens (Italy) Francesca Schiavone (Poland) Magda Linette
11 Apr	Fed Cup Semifinals; Lucerne, Switzerland – hard (i); Trélazé, France – Clay (red) (i)	Semifinals winners Czech Republic 3–2; France 3–2	Semifinals losers Switzerland; Netherlands		
11 Apr	Copa Colsanitas; Bogotá, Colombia; WTA International; Clay (red) – $250,000 – 32S/24Q/16D; Singles – Doubles	(United States) Irina Falconi; 6–2, 2–6, 6–4	(Spain) Sílvia Soler Espinosa	(Brazil) Paula Cristina Gonçalves (Spain) Lara Arruabarrena	(Russia) Alexandra Panova (Switzerland) Amra Sadiković (United States) Sachia Vickery (Argentina) Catalina Pella
11 Apr	Copa Colsanitas; Bogotá, Colombia; WTA International; Clay (red) – $250,000 – 32S/24Q/16D; Singles – Doubles	(Spain) Lara Arruabarrena (Germany) Tatjana Maria; 6–2, 4–6, [10–8]	(Brazil) Gabriela Cé (Venezuela) Andrea Gámiz	(Brazil) Paula Cristina Gonçalves (Spain) Lara Arruabarrena	(Russia) Alexandra Panova (Switzerland) Amra Sadiković (United States) Sachia Vickery (Argentina) Catalina Pella
18 Apr	Stuttgart Open; Stuttgart, Germany; WTA Premier; Clay (red) (i) – $759,000 – 28S/32Q/16D; Singles – Doubles	(Germany) Angelique Kerber; 6–4, 6–0	(Germany) Laura Siegemund	(Poland) Agnieszka Radwańska (Czech Republic) Petra Kvitová	(Czech Republic) Karolína Plíšková (Italy) Roberta Vinci (Spain) Garbiñe Muguruza (Spain) Carla Suárez Navarro
18 Apr	Stuttgart Open; Stuttgart, Germany; WTA Premier; Clay (red) (i) – $759,000 – 28S/32Q/16D; Singles – Doubles	(France) Caroline Garcia (France) Kristina Mladenovic; 2–6, 6–1, [10–6]	(Switzerland) Martina Hingis (India) Sania Mirza	(Poland) Agnieszka Radwańska (Czech Republic) Petra Kvitová	(Czech Republic) Karolína Plíšková (Italy) Roberta Vinci (Spain) Garbiñe Muguruza (Spain) Carla Suárez Navarro
18 Apr	İstanbul Cup; Istanbul, Turkey; WTA International; Clay (red) – $250,000 – 32S/24Q/16D; Singles – Doubles	(Turkey) Çağla Büyükakçay; 3–6, 6–2, 6–3	(Montenegro) Danka Kovinić	(Ukraine) Kateryna Kozlova (Switzerland) Stefanie Vögele	(Greece) Maria Sakkari (Latvia) Anastasija Sevastova (Japan) Nao Hibino (Slovakia) Kristína Kučová
18 Apr	İstanbul Cup; Istanbul, Turkey; WTA International; Clay (red) – $250,000 – 32S/24Q/16D; Singles – Doubles	(Romania) Andreea Mitu (Turkey) İpek Soylu; Walkover	(Switzerland) Xenia Knoll (Montenegro) Danka Kovinić	(Ukraine) Kateryna Kozlova (Switzerland) Stefanie Vögele	(Greece) Maria Sakkari (Latvia) Anastasija Sevastova (Japan) Nao Hibino (Slovakia) Kristína Kučová
25 Apr	Morocco Open; Rabat, Morocco; WTA International; Clay (red) – $250,000 – 32S/32Q/16D; Singles – Doubles	(Switzerland) Timea Bacsinszky; 6–2, 6–1	(New Zealand) Marina Erakovic	(Hungary) Tímea Babos (Netherlands) Kiki Bertens	(Sweden) Johanna Larsson (France) Pauline Parmentier (Kazakhstan) Yulia Putintseva (Serbia) Aleksandra Krunić
25 Apr	Morocco Open; Rabat, Morocco; WTA International; Clay (red) – $250,000 – 32S/32Q/16D; Singles – Doubles	(Switzerland) Xenia Knoll (Serbia) Aleksandra Krunić; 6–3, 6–0	(Germany) Tatjana Maria (Romania) Raluca Olaru	(Hungary) Tímea Babos (Netherlands) Kiki Bertens	(Sweden) Johanna Larsson (France) Pauline Parmentier (Kazakhstan) Yulia Putintseva (Serbia) Aleksandra Krunić
25 Apr	Prague Open; Prague, Czech Republic; WTA International; Clay (red) – $500,000 – 32S/32Q/16D; Singles – Doubles	(Czech Republic) Lucie Šafářová; 3–6, 6–1, 6–4	(Australia) Samantha Stosur	(Russia) Svetlana Kuznetsova (Czech Republic) Karolína Plíšková	(Puerto Rico) Monica Puig (Czech Republic) Barbora Strýcová (Italy) Camila Giorgi (Chinese Taipei) Hsieh Su-wei
25 Apr	Prague Open; Prague, Czech Republic; WTA International; Clay (red) – $500,000 – 32S/32Q/16D; Singles – Doubles	(Russia) Margarita Gasparyan (Czech Republic) Andrea Hlaváčková; 6–4, 6–2	(Argentina) María Irigoyen (Poland) Paula Kania	(Russia) Svetlana Kuznetsova (Czech Republic) Karolína Plíšková	(Puerto Rico) Monica Puig (Czech Republic) Barbora Strýcová (Italy) Camila Giorgi (Chinese Taipei) Hsieh Su-wei

=== May ===
Week	Tournament	Champions	Runners-up	Semifinalists	Quarterfinalists
1 May	Madrid Open; Madrid, Spain; WTA Premier Mandatory; Clay (red) – €5,300,951 – 64S/32Q/28D; Singles – Doubles	(Romania) Simona Halep; 6–2, 6–4	(Slovakia) Dominika Cibulková	(United States) Louisa Chirico (Australia) Samantha Stosur	(Romania) Sorana Cîrstea (Australia) Daria Gavrilova (Romania) Irina-Camelia Begu (Romania) Patricia Maria Țig
1 May	Madrid Open; Madrid, Spain; WTA Premier Mandatory; Clay (red) – €5,300,951 – 64S/32Q/28D; Singles – Doubles	(France) Caroline Garcia (France) Kristina Mladenovic; 6–4, 6–4	(Switzerland) Martina Hingis (India) Sania Mirza	(United States) Louisa Chirico (Australia) Samantha Stosur	(Romania) Sorana Cîrstea (Australia) Daria Gavrilova (Romania) Irina-Camelia Begu (Romania) Patricia Maria Țig
9 May	Italian Open; Rome, Italy; WTA Premier 5 Clay (red) – €2,900,360 – 56S/32Q/28D; Singles – Doubles	(United States) Serena Williams; 7–6^{(7–5)}, 6–3	(United States) Madison Keys	(Romania) Irina-Camelia Begu (Spain) Garbiñe Muguruza	(Russia) Svetlana Kuznetsova (Japan) Misaki Doi (Switzerland) Timea Bacsinszky (Czech Republic) Barbora Strýcová
9 May	Italian Open; Rome, Italy; WTA Premier 5 Clay (red) – €2,900,360 – 56S/32Q/28D; Singles – Doubles	(Switzerland) Martina Hingis (India) Sania Mirza; 6–1, 6–7^{(5–7)}, [10–3]	(Russia) Ekaterina Makarova (Russia) Elena Vesnina	(Romania) Irina-Camelia Begu (Spain) Garbiñe Muguruza	(Russia) Svetlana Kuznetsova (Japan) Misaki Doi (Switzerland) Timea Bacsinszky (Czech Republic) Barbora Strýcová
16 May	Internationaux de Strasbourg; Strasbourg, France; WTA International; Clay (red) – $250,000 – 32S/24Q/16D; Singles – Doubles	(France) Caroline Garcia; 6–4, 6–1	(Croatia) Mirjana Lučić-Baroni	(France) Virginie Razzano (France) Kristina Mladenovic	(Russia) Elena Vesnina (Australia) Samantha Stosur (Russia) Alla Kudryavtseva (France) Pauline Parmentier
16 May	Internationaux de Strasbourg; Strasbourg, France; WTA International; Clay (red) – $250,000 – 32S/24Q/16D; Singles – Doubles	(Spain) Anabel Medina Garrigues (Spain) Arantxa Parra Santonja; 6–2, 6–0	(Argentina) María Irigoyen (China) Liang Chen	(France) Virginie Razzano (France) Kristina Mladenovic	(Russia) Elena Vesnina (Australia) Samantha Stosur (Russia) Alla Kudryavtseva (France) Pauline Parmentier
16 May	Nuremberg Cup; Nürnberg, Germany; WTA International; Clay (red) – $250,000 – 32S/24Q/16D; Singles – Doubles	(Netherlands) Kiki Bertens; 6–2, 6–2	(Colombia) Mariana Duque Mariño	(Germany) Julia Görges (Germany) Annika Beck	(United States) Irina Falconi (Ukraine) Lesia Tsurenko (Germany) Anna-Lena Friedsam (United States) Varvara Lepchenko
16 May	Nuremberg Cup; Nürnberg, Germany; WTA International; Clay (red) – $250,000 – 32S/24Q/16D; Singles – Doubles	(Netherlands) Kiki Bertens (Sweden) Johanna Larsson; 6–3, 6–4	(Japan) Shuko Aoyama (Czech Republic) Renata Voráčová	(Germany) Julia Görges (Germany) Annika Beck	(United States) Irina Falconi (Ukraine) Lesia Tsurenko (Germany) Anna-Lena Friedsam (United States) Varvara Lepchenko
23 May; 30 May	French Open; Paris, France; Grand Slam; Clay (red) – €14,712,000; 128S/96Q/64D/32X; Singles – Doubles – Mixed	(Spain) Garbiñe Muguruza; 7–5, 6–4	(United States) Serena Williams	(Netherlands) Kiki Bertens (Australia) Samantha Stosur	(Kazakhstan) Yulia Putintseva (Switzerland) Timea Bacsinszky (United States) Shelby Rogers (Bulgaria) Tsvetana Pironkova
23 May; 30 May	French Open; Paris, France; Grand Slam; Clay (red) – €14,712,000; 128S/96Q/64D/32X; Singles – Doubles – Mixed	(France) Caroline Garcia (France) Kristina Mladenovic; 6–3, 2–6, 6–4	(Russia) Ekaterina Makarova (Russia) Elena Vesnina	(Netherlands) Kiki Bertens (Australia) Samantha Stosur	(Kazakhstan) Yulia Putintseva (Switzerland) Timea Bacsinszky (United States) Shelby Rogers (Bulgaria) Tsvetana Pironkova
23 May; 30 May	French Open; Paris, France; Grand Slam; Clay (red) – €14,712,000; 128S/96Q/64D/32X; Singles – Doubles – Mixed	(Switzerland) Martina Hingis (India) Leander Paes; 4–6, 6–4, [10–8]	(India) Sania Mirza (Croatia) Ivan Dodig	(Netherlands) Kiki Bertens (Australia) Samantha Stosur	(Kazakhstan) Yulia Putintseva (Switzerland) Timea Bacsinszky (United States) Shelby Rogers (Bulgaria) Tsvetana Pironkova

=== June ===
Week	Tournament	Champions	Runners-up	Semifinalists	Quarterfinalists
6 Jun	Nottingham Open; Nottingham, Great Britain; WTA International; Grass – $250,000 – 32S/32Q/16D; Singles – Doubles	(Czech Republic) Karolína Plíšková; 7–6^{(10–8)}, 7–5	(United States) Alison Riske	(Puerto Rico) Monica Puig (China) Zheng Saisai	(Australia) Ashleigh Barty (Austria) Tamira Paszek (Estonia) Anett Kontaveit (United Kingdom) Tara Moore
6 Jun	Nottingham Open; Nottingham, Great Britain; WTA International; Grass – $250,000 – 32S/32Q/16D; Singles – Doubles	(Czech Republic) Andrea Hlaváčková (China) Peng Shuai; 7–5, 3–6, [10–7]	(Canada) Gabriela Dabrowski (China) Yang Zhaoxuan	(Puerto Rico) Monica Puig (China) Zheng Saisai	(Australia) Ashleigh Barty (Austria) Tamira Paszek (Estonia) Anett Kontaveit (United Kingdom) Tara Moore
6 Jun	Rosmalen Grass Court Championships; Rosmalen, Netherlands; WTA International; Grass – $250,000 – 32S/24Q/16D; Singles – Doubles	(United States) CoCo Vandeweghe; 7–5, 7–5	(France) Kristina Mladenovic	(Switzerland) Belinda Bencic (United States) Madison Brengle	(Switzerland) Viktorija Golubic (Belgium) Elise Mertens (Ukraine) Kateryna Kozlova (Russia) Evgeniya Rodina
6 Jun	Rosmalen Grass Court Championships; Rosmalen, Netherlands; WTA International; Grass – $250,000 – 32S/24Q/16D; Singles – Doubles	(Georgia (country)) Oksana Kalashnikova (Kazakhstan) Yaroslava Shvedova; 6–1, 6–1	(Switzerland) Xenia Knoll (Serbia) Aleksandra Krunić	(Switzerland) Belinda Bencic (United States) Madison Brengle	(Switzerland) Viktorija Golubic (Belgium) Elise Mertens (Ukraine) Kateryna Kozlova (Russia) Evgeniya Rodina
13 Jun	Birmingham Classic; Birmingham, Great Britain; WTA Premier; Grass – $846,000 – 32S/32Q/16D; Singles – Doubles	(United States) Madison Keys; 6–3, 6–4	(Czech Republic) Barbora Strýcová	(United States) CoCo Vandeweghe (Spain) Carla Suárez Navarro	(Belgium) Yanina Wickmayer (Bulgaria) Tsvetana Pironkova (Latvia) Jeļena Ostapenko (Germany) Angelique Kerber
13 Jun	Birmingham Classic; Birmingham, Great Britain; WTA Premier; Grass – $846,000 – 32S/32Q/16D; Singles – Doubles	(Czech Republic) Karolína Plíšková (Czech Republic) Barbora Strýcová; 6–3, 7–6^{(7–1)}	(United States) Vania King (Russia) Alla Kudryavtseva	(United States) CoCo Vandeweghe (Spain) Carla Suárez Navarro	(Belgium) Yanina Wickmayer (Bulgaria) Tsvetana Pironkova (Latvia) Jeļena Ostapenko (Germany) Angelique Kerber
13 Jun	Mallorca Open; Santa Ponsa, Spain; WTA International; Grass – $250,000 – 32S/32Q/16D; Singles – Doubles	(France) Caroline Garcia; 6–3, 6–4	(Latvia) Anastasija Sevastova	(Belgium) Kirsten Flipkens (Serbia) Jelena Janković	(Paraguay) Verónica Cepede Royg (Serbia) Ana Ivanovic (Colombia) Mariana Duque Mariño (Romania) Sorana Cîrstea
13 Jun	Mallorca Open; Santa Ponsa, Spain; WTA International; Grass – $250,000 – 32S/32Q/16D; Singles – Doubles	(Canada) Gabriela Dabrowski (Spain) María José Martínez Sánchez; 6–4, 6–2	(Germany) Anna-Lena Friedsam (Germany) Laura Siegemund	(Belgium) Kirsten Flipkens (Serbia) Jelena Janković	(Paraguay) Verónica Cepede Royg (Serbia) Ana Ivanovic (Colombia) Mariana Duque Mariño (Romania) Sorana Cîrstea
20 Jun	Eastbourne International; Eastbourne, Great Britain; WTA Premier; Grass – $776,878 – 48S/32Q/16D; Singles – Doubles	(Slovakia) Dominika Cibulková; 7–5, 6–3	(Czech Republic) Karolína Plíšková	(Puerto Rico) Monica Puig (United Kingdom) Johanna Konta	(Poland) Agnieszka Radwańska (France) Kristina Mladenovic (Russia) Elena Vesnina (Russia) Ekaterina Makarova
20 Jun	Eastbourne International; Eastbourne, Great Britain; WTA Premier; Grass – $776,878 – 48S/32Q/16D; Singles – Doubles	(Croatia) Darija Jurak (Australia) Anastasia Rodionova; 5–7, 7–6^{(7–4)}, [10–6]	(Chinese Taipei) Chan Hao-ching (Chinese Taipei) Chan Yung-jan	(Puerto Rico) Monica Puig (United Kingdom) Johanna Konta	(Poland) Agnieszka Radwańska (France) Kristina Mladenovic (Russia) Elena Vesnina (Russia) Ekaterina Makarova
27 Jun; 4 Jul	The Championships, Wimbledon; London, Great Britain; Grand Slam; Grass – £12,983,000; 128S/96Q/64D/16Q/48X; Singles – Doubles – Mixed	(United States) Serena Williams; 7–5, 6–3	(Germany) Angelique Kerber	(Russia) Elena Vesnina (United States) Venus Williams	(Russia) Anastasia Pavlyuchenkova (Slovakia) Dominika Cibulková (Romania) Simona Halep (Kazakhstan) Yaroslava Shvedova
27 Jun; 4 Jul	The Championships, Wimbledon; London, Great Britain; Grand Slam; Grass – £12,983,000; 128S/96Q/64D/16Q/48X; Singles – Doubles – Mixed	(United States) Serena Williams (United States) Venus Williams; 6–3, 6–4	(Hungary) Tímea Babos (Kazakhstan) Yaroslava Shvedova	(Russia) Elena Vesnina (United States) Venus Williams	(Russia) Anastasia Pavlyuchenkova (Slovakia) Dominika Cibulková (Romania) Simona Halep (Kazakhstan) Yaroslava Shvedova
27 Jun; 4 Jul	The Championships, Wimbledon; London, Great Britain; Grand Slam; Grass – £12,983,000; 128S/96Q/64D/16Q/48X; Singles – Doubles – Mixed	(United Kingdom) Heather Watson (Finland) Henri Kontinen; 7–6^{(7–5)}, 6–4	(Germany) Anna-Lena Grönefeld (Colombia) Robert Farah	(Russia) Elena Vesnina (United States) Venus Williams	(Russia) Anastasia Pavlyuchenkova (Slovakia) Dominika Cibulková (Romania) Simona Halep (Kazakhstan) Yaroslava Shvedova

=== July ===
Week	Tournament	Champions	Runners-up	Semifinalists	Quarterfinalists
11 Jul	Bucharest Open; Bucharest, Romania; WTA International; Clay (red) – $250,000 – 32S/32Q/16D; Singles – Doubles	(Romania) Simona Halep; 6–0, 6–0	(Latvia) Anastasija Sevastova	(United States) Vania King (Germany) Laura Siegemund	(Montenegro) Danka Kovinić (France) Pauline Parmentier (Slovenia) Polona Hercog (Italy) Sara Errani
11 Jul	Bucharest Open; Bucharest, Romania; WTA International; Clay (red) – $250,000 – 32S/32Q/16D; Singles – Doubles	(Australia) Jessica Moore (Thailand) Varatchaya Wongteanchai; 6–3, 7–6^{(7–5)}	(Romania) Alexandra Cadanțu (Poland) Katarzyna Piter	(United States) Vania King (Germany) Laura Siegemund	(Montenegro) Danka Kovinić (France) Pauline Parmentier (Slovenia) Polona Hercog (Italy) Sara Errani
11 Jul	Ladies Championship Gstaad; Gstaad, Switzerland; WTA International; Clay (red) – $250,000 – 32S/24Q/16D; Singles – Doubles	(Switzerland) Viktorija Golubic; 4–6, 6–3, 6–4	(Netherlands) Kiki Bertens	(Switzerland) Timea Bacsinszky (Switzerland) Rebeka Masarova	(Sweden) Johanna Larsson (Russia) Irina Khromacheva (Germany) Carina Witthöft (Germany) Annika Beck
11 Jul	Ladies Championship Gstaad; Gstaad, Switzerland; WTA International; Clay (red) – $250,000 – 32S/24Q/16D; Singles – Doubles	(Spain) Lara Arruabarrena (Switzerland) Xenia Knoll; 6–1, 3–6, [10–8]	(Germany) Annika Beck (Russia) Evgeniya Rodina	(Switzerland) Timea Bacsinszky (Switzerland) Rebeka Masarova	(Sweden) Johanna Larsson (Russia) Irina Khromacheva (Germany) Carina Witthöft (Germany) Annika Beck
18 Jul	Stanford Classic; Stanford, United States; WTA Premier; Hard – $846,000 – 28S/16Q/16D; Singles – Doubles	(United Kingdom) Johanna Konta; 7–5, 5–7, 6–2	(United States) Venus Williams	(United States) Alison Riske (Slovakia) Dominika Cibulková	(United States) Catherine Bellis (United States) CoCo Vandeweghe (China) Zheng Saisai (Japan) Misaki Doi
18 Jul	Stanford Classic; Stanford, United States; WTA Premier; Hard – $846,000 – 28S/16Q/16D; Singles – Doubles	(United States) Raquel Atawo (United States) Abigail Spears; 6–3, 6–4	(Croatia) Darija Jurak (Australia) Anastasia Rodionova	(United States) Alison Riske (Slovakia) Dominika Cibulková	(United States) Catherine Bellis (United States) CoCo Vandeweghe (China) Zheng Saisai (Japan) Misaki Doi
18 Jul	Swedish Open; Båstad, Sweden; WTA International; Clay (red) – $250,000 – 32S/24Q/16D; Singles – Doubles	(Germany) Laura Siegemund; 7–5, 6–1	(Czech Republic) Kateřina Siniaková	(Germany) Julia Görges (Sweden) Johanna Larsson	(Spain) Lara Arruabarrena (Italy) Karin Knapp (Germany) Annika Beck (Italy) Sara Errani
18 Jul	Swedish Open; Båstad, Sweden; WTA International; Clay (red) – $250,000 – 32S/24Q/16D; Singles – Doubles	(Romania) Andreea Mitu (Poland) Alicja Rosolska; 6–3, 7–5	(Netherlands) Lesley Kerkhove (Belarus) Lidziya Marozava	(Germany) Julia Görges (Sweden) Johanna Larsson	(Spain) Lara Arruabarrena (Italy) Karin Knapp (Germany) Annika Beck (Italy) Sara Errani
18 Jul	Washington Open; Washington, D.C., United States; WTA International; Hard – $250,000 – 32S/16Q/16D; Singles – Doubles	(Belgium) Yanina Wickmayer; 6–4, 6–2	(United States) Lauren Davis	(United States) Jessica Pegula (Kazakhstan) Yulia Putintseva	(Australia) Samantha Stosur (Italy) Camila Giorgi (France) Kristina Mladenovic (Japan) Risa Ozaki
18 Jul	Washington Open; Washington, D.C., United States; WTA International; Hard – $250,000 – 32S/16Q/16D; Singles – Doubles	(Romania) Monica Niculescu (Belgium) Yanina Wickmayer; 6–4, 6–3	(Japan) Shuko Aoyama (Japan) Risa Ozaki	(United States) Jessica Pegula (Kazakhstan) Yulia Putintseva	(Australia) Samantha Stosur (Italy) Camila Giorgi (France) Kristina Mladenovic (Japan) Risa Ozaki
25 Jul	Canadian Open; Montreal, Canada; WTA Premier 5 Hard – $2,714,413 – 56S/48Q/28D; Singles – Doubles	(Romania) Simona Halep; 7–6^{(7–2)}, 6–3	(United States) Madison Keys	(Slovakia) Kristína Kučová (Germany) Angelique Kerber	(United Kingdom) Johanna Konta (Russia) Anastasia Pavlyuchenkova (Russia) Svetlana Kuznetsova (Russia) Daria Kasatkina
25 Jul	Canadian Open; Montreal, Canada; WTA Premier 5 Hard – $2,714,413 – 56S/48Q/28D; Singles – Doubles	(Russia) Ekaterina Makarova (Russia) Elena Vesnina; 6–3, 7–6^{(7–5)}	(Romania) Simona Halep (Romania) Monica Niculescu	(Slovakia) Kristína Kučová (Germany) Angelique Kerber	(United Kingdom) Johanna Konta (Russia) Anastasia Pavlyuchenkova (Russia) Svetlana Kuznetsova (Russia) Daria Kasatkina

=== August ===
Week	Tournament	Champions	Runners-up	Semifinalists	Quarterfinalists
1 Aug	Brasil Tennis Cup; Florianópolis, Brazil; WTA International; Hard – $250,000 – 32S/24Q/16D; Singles – Doubles	(Romania) Irina-Camelia Begu; 2–6, 6–4, 6–3	(Hungary) Tímea Babos	(Romania) Ana Bogdan (Puerto Rico) Monica Puig	(Ukraine) Lyudmyla Kichenok (Latvia) Jeļena Ostapenko (Japan) Naomi Osaka (Japan) Nao Hibino
1 Aug	Brasil Tennis Cup; Florianópolis, Brazil; WTA International; Hard – $250,000 – 32S/24Q/16D; Singles – Doubles	(Ukraine) Lyudmyla Kichenok (Ukraine) Nadiia Kichenok; 6–3, 6–1	(Hungary) Tímea Babos (Hungary) Réka Luca Jani	(Romania) Ana Bogdan (Puerto Rico) Monica Puig	(Ukraine) Lyudmyla Kichenok (Latvia) Jeļena Ostapenko (Japan) Naomi Osaka (Japan) Nao Hibino
1 Aug	Jiangxi Open; Nanchang, China; WTA International; Hard – $250,000 – 32S/24Q/16D; Singles – Doubles	(China) Duan Yingying; 1–6, 6–4, 6–2	(United States) Vania King	(Japan) Risa Ozaki (Japan) Misa Eguchi	(Italy) Francesca Schiavone (China) Zhang Kailin (China) Liu Fangzhou (Japan) Kurumi Nara
1 Aug	Jiangxi Open; Nanchang, China; WTA International; Hard – $250,000 – 32S/24Q/16D; Singles – Doubles	(China) Liang Chen (China) Lu Jingjing; 3–6, 7–6^{(7–2)}, [13–11]	(Japan) Shuko Aoyama (Japan) Makoto Ninomiya	(Japan) Risa Ozaki (Japan) Misa Eguchi	(Italy) Francesca Schiavone (China) Zhang Kailin (China) Liu Fangzhou (Japan) Kurumi Nara
8 Aug	Summer Olympic Games; Rio de Janeiro, Brazil; Summer Olympic Games; Hard – 64S/32D/16X; Singles – Doubles – Mixed	Gold	Silver	Bronze	Fourth place
8 Aug	Summer Olympic Games; Rio de Janeiro, Brazil; Summer Olympic Games; Hard – 64S/32D/16X; Singles – Doubles – Mixed	(Puerto Rico) Monica Puig; 6–4, 4–6, 6–1	(Germany) Angelique Kerber	(Czech Republic) Petra Kvitová; 7–5, 2–6, 6–2	(United States) Madison Keys
8 Aug	Summer Olympic Games; Rio de Janeiro, Brazil; Summer Olympic Games; Hard – 64S/32D/16X; Singles – Doubles – Mixed	(Russia) Ekaterina Makarova (Russia) Elena Vesnina; 6–4, 6–4	(Switzerland) Timea Bacsinszky (Switzerland) Martina Hingis	(Czech Republic) Lucie Šafářová (Czech Republic) Barbora Strýcová; 7–5, 6–1	(Czech Republic) Andrea Hlaváčková (Czech Republic) Lucie Hradecká
8 Aug	Summer Olympic Games; Rio de Janeiro, Brazil; Summer Olympic Games; Hard – 64S/32D/16X; Singles – Doubles – Mixed	(United States) Bethanie Mattek-Sands (United States) Jack Sock; 6–7^{(3–7)}, 6–1, [10–7]	(United States) Venus Williams (United States) Rajeev Ram	(Czech Republic) Lucie Hradecká (Czech Republic) Radek Štěpánek; 6–1, 7–5	(India) Sania Mirza (India) Rohan Bopanna
15 Aug	Cincinnati Open; Mason, United States; WTA Premier 5 Hard – $2,804,000 – 48S/48Q/28D; Singles – Doubles	(Czech Republic) Karolína Plíšková; 6–3, 6–1	(Germany) Angelique Kerber	(Spain) Garbiñe Muguruza (Romania) Simona Halep	(Russia) Svetlana Kuznetsova (Hungary) Tímea Babos (Poland) Agnieszka Radwańska (Spain) Carla Suárez Navarro
15 Aug	Cincinnati Open; Mason, United States; WTA Premier 5 Hard – $2,804,000 – 48S/48Q/28D; Singles – Doubles	(India) Sania Mirza (Czech Republic) Barbora Strýcová; 7–5, 6–4	(Switzerland) Martina Hingis (United States) CoCo Vandeweghe	(Spain) Garbiñe Muguruza (Romania) Simona Halep	(Russia) Svetlana Kuznetsova (Hungary) Tímea Babos (Poland) Agnieszka Radwańska (Spain) Carla Suárez Navarro
22 Aug	Connecticut Open; New Haven, United States; WTA Premier; Hard – $761,000 – 30S/48Q/16D; Singles – Doubles	(Poland) Agnieszka Radwańska; 6–1, 7–6^{(7–3)}	(Ukraine) Elina Svitolina	(Czech Republic) Petra Kvitová (Sweden) Johanna Larsson	(Belgium) Kirsten Flipkens (Russia) Ekaterina Makarova (Russia) Elena Vesnina (Italy) Roberta Vinci
22 Aug	Connecticut Open; New Haven, United States; WTA Premier; Hard – $761,000 – 30S/48Q/16D; Singles – Doubles	(India) Sania Mirza (Romania) Monica Niculescu; 7–5, 6–4	(Ukraine) Kateryna Bondarenko (Chinese Taipei) Chuang Chia-jung	(Czech Republic) Petra Kvitová (Sweden) Johanna Larsson	(Belgium) Kirsten Flipkens (Russia) Ekaterina Makarova (Russia) Elena Vesnina (Italy) Roberta Vinci
29 Aug; 5 Sep	US Open; New York City, United States; Grand Slam; Hard – $22,112,700; 128S/128Q/64D/32X; Singles – Doubles – Mixed	(Germany) Angelique Kerber; 6–3, 4–6, 6–4	(Czech Republic) Karolína Plíšková	(United States) Serena Williams (Denmark) Caroline Wozniacki	(Romania) Simona Halep (Croatia) Ana Konjuh (Latvia) Anastasija Sevastova (Italy) Roberta Vinci
29 Aug; 5 Sep	US Open; New York City, United States; Grand Slam; Hard – $22,112,700; 128S/128Q/64D/32X; Singles – Doubles – Mixed	(United States) Bethanie Mattek-Sands (Czech Republic) Lucie Šafářová; 2–6, 7–6^{(7–5)}, 6–4	(France) Caroline Garcia (France) Kristina Mladenovic	(United States) Serena Williams (Denmark) Caroline Wozniacki	(Romania) Simona Halep (Croatia) Ana Konjuh (Latvia) Anastasija Sevastova (Italy) Roberta Vinci
29 Aug; 5 Sep	US Open; New York City, United States; Grand Slam; Hard – $22,112,700; 128S/128Q/64D/32X; Singles – Doubles – Mixed	(Germany) Laura Siegemund (Croatia) Mate Pavić; 6–4, 6–4	(United States) CoCo Vandeweghe (United States) Rajeev Ram	(United States) Serena Williams (Denmark) Caroline Wozniacki	(Romania) Simona Halep (Croatia) Ana Konjuh (Latvia) Anastasija Sevastova (Italy) Roberta Vinci

=== September ===
Week	Tournament	Champions	Runners-up	Semifinalists	Quarterfinalists
12 Sep	Tournoi de Québec; Quebec City, Canada; WTA International; Carpet (i) – $250,000 – 32S/24Q/16D; Singles – Doubles	(France) Océane Dodin; 6–4, 6–3	(United States) Lauren Davis	(Czech Republic) Tereza Martincová (United States) Julia Boserup	(Russia) Alla Kudryavtseva (United States) Jessica Pegula (United States) Catherine Bellis (Belgium) Alison Van Uytvanck
12 Sep	Tournoi de Québec; Quebec City, Canada; WTA International; Carpet (i) – $250,000 – 32S/24Q/16D; Singles – Doubles	(Czech Republic) Andrea Hlaváčková (Czech Republic) Lucie Hradecká; 7–6^{(7–2)}, 7–6^{(7–2)}	(Russia) Alla Kudryavtseva (Russia) Alexandra Panova	(Czech Republic) Tereza Martincová (United States) Julia Boserup	(Russia) Alla Kudryavtseva (United States) Jessica Pegula (United States) Catherine Bellis (Belgium) Alison Van Uytvanck
12 Sep	Japan Women's Open; Tokyo, Japan; WTA International; Hard – $250,000 – 32S/32Q/16D; Singles – Doubles	(United States) Christina McHale; 3–6, 6–4, 6–4	(Czech Republic) Kateřina Siniaková	(China) Zhang Shuai (Slovakia) Jana Čepelová	(United States) Alison Riske (United States) Varvara Lepchenko (Japan) Kurumi Nara (Switzerland) Viktorija Golubic
12 Sep	Japan Women's Open; Tokyo, Japan; WTA International; Hard – $250,000 – 32S/32Q/16D; Singles – Doubles	(Japan) Shuko Aoyama (Japan) Makoto Ninomiya; 6–3, 6–3	(United Kingdom) Jocelyn Rae (United Kingdom) Anna Smith	(China) Zhang Shuai (Slovakia) Jana Čepelová	(United States) Alison Riske (United States) Varvara Lepchenko (Japan) Kurumi Nara (Switzerland) Viktorija Golubic
19 Sep	Pan Pacific Open; Tokyo, Japan; WTA Premier; Hard – $1,000,000 – 28S/32Q/16D; Singles – Doubles	(Denmark) Caroline Wozniacki; 7–5, 6–3	(Japan) Naomi Osaka	(Ukraine) Elina Svitolina (Poland) Agnieszka Radwańska	(Spain) Garbiñe Muguruza (Belarus) Aliaksandra Sasnovich (Poland) Magda Linette (Puerto Rico) Monica Puig
19 Sep	Pan Pacific Open; Tokyo, Japan; WTA Premier; Hard – $1,000,000 – 28S/32Q/16D; Singles – Doubles	(India) Sania Mirza (Czech Republic) Barbora Strýcová; 6–1, 6–1	(China) Liang Chen (China) Yang Zhaoxuan	(Ukraine) Elina Svitolina (Poland) Agnieszka Radwańska	(Spain) Garbiñe Muguruza (Belarus) Aliaksandra Sasnovich (Poland) Magda Linette (Puerto Rico) Monica Puig
19 Sep	Korea Open; Seoul, South Korea; WTA International; Hard – $250,000 – 32S/32Q/16D; Singles – Doubles	(Spain) Lara Arruabarrena; 6–0, 2–6, 6–0	(Romania) Monica Niculescu	(China) Zhang Shuai (Romania) Patricia Maria Țig	(Slovakia) Jana Čepelová (Italy) Camila Giorgi (Spain) Sara Sorribes Tormo (Sweden) Johanna Larsson
19 Sep	Korea Open; Seoul, South Korea; WTA International; Hard – $250,000 – 32S/32Q/16D; Singles – Doubles	(Belgium) Kirsten Flipkens (Sweden) Johanna Larsson; 6–2, 6–3	(Japan) Akiko Omae (Thailand) Peangtarn Plipuech	(China) Zhang Shuai (Romania) Patricia Maria Țig	(Slovakia) Jana Čepelová (Italy) Camila Giorgi (Spain) Sara Sorribes Tormo (Sweden) Johanna Larsson
19 Sep	Guangzhou International Women's Open; Guangzhou, China; WTA International; Hard – $250,000 – 32S/24Q/16D; Singles – Doubles	(Ukraine) Lesia Tsurenko; 6–4, 3–6, 6–4	(Serbia) Jelena Janković	(Estonia) Anett Kontaveit (Croatia) Ana Konjuh	(Switzerland) Viktorija Golubic (United States) Alison Riske (United States) Jennifer Brady (Germany) Sabine Lisicki
19 Sep	Guangzhou International Women's Open; Guangzhou, China; WTA International; Hard – $250,000 – 32S/24Q/16D; Singles – Doubles	(United States) Asia Muhammad (China) Peng Shuai; 6–2, 7–6^{(7–3)}	(Belarus) Olga Govortsova (Belarus) Vera Lapko	(Estonia) Anett Kontaveit (Croatia) Ana Konjuh	(Switzerland) Viktorija Golubic (United States) Alison Riske (United States) Jennifer Brady (Germany) Sabine Lisicki
26 Sep	Wuhan Open; Wuhan, China; WTA Premier 5 Hard – $2,589,000 – 56S/32Q/28D; Singles – Doubles	(Czech Republic) Petra Kvitová; 6–1, 6–1	(Slovakia) Dominika Cibulková	(Romania) Simona Halep (Russia) Svetlana Kuznetsova	(United Kingdom) Johanna Konta (United States) Madison Keys (Poland) Agnieszka Radwańska (Czech Republic) Barbora Strýcová
26 Sep	Wuhan Open; Wuhan, China; WTA Premier 5 Hard – $2,589,000 – 56S/32Q/28D; Singles – Doubles	(United States) Bethanie Mattek-Sands (Czech Republic) Lucie Šafářová; 6–1, 6–4	(India) Sania Mirza (Czech Republic) Barbora Strýcová	(Romania) Simona Halep (Russia) Svetlana Kuznetsova	(United Kingdom) Johanna Konta (United States) Madison Keys (Poland) Agnieszka Radwańska (Czech Republic) Barbora Strýcová
26 Sep	Tashkent Open; Tashkent, Uzbekistan; WTA International; Hard – $250,000 – 32S/16Q/16D; Singles – Doubles	(Czech Republic) Kristýna Plíšková; 6–3, 2–6, 6–3	(Japan) Nao Hibino	(Ukraine) Kateryna Kozlova (Czech Republic) Denisa Allertová	(Switzerland) Stefanie Vögele (Russia) Irina Khromacheva (Ukraine) Lesia Tsurenko (Belgium) Kirsten Flipkens
26 Sep	Tashkent Open; Tashkent, Uzbekistan; WTA International; Hard – $250,000 – 32S/16Q/16D; Singles – Doubles	(Romania) Raluca Olaru (Turkey) İpek Soylu; 7–5, 6–3	(Netherlands) Demi Schuurs (Czech Republic) Renata Voráčová	(Ukraine) Kateryna Kozlova (Czech Republic) Denisa Allertová	(Switzerland) Stefanie Vögele (Russia) Irina Khromacheva (Ukraine) Lesia Tsurenko (Belgium) Kirsten Flipkens

=== October ===
Week	Tournament	Champions	Runners-up	Semifinalists	Quarterfinalists
3 Oct	China Open; Beijing, China; WTA Premier Mandatory; Hard – $6,289,521 – 60S/32Q/28D; Singles – Doubles	(Poland) Agnieszka Radwańska; 6–4, 6–2	(United Kingdom) Johanna Konta	(Ukraine) Elina Svitolina (United States) Madison Keys	(Australia) Daria Gavrilova (Kazakhstan) Yaroslava Shvedova (China) Zhang Shuai (Czech Republic) Petra Kvitová
3 Oct	China Open; Beijing, China; WTA Premier Mandatory; Hard – $6,289,521 – 60S/32Q/28D; Singles – Doubles	(United States) Bethanie Mattek-Sands (Czech Republic) Lucie Šafářová; 6–4, 6–4	(France) Caroline Garcia (France) Kristina Mladenovic	(Ukraine) Elina Svitolina (United States) Madison Keys	(Australia) Daria Gavrilova (Kazakhstan) Yaroslava Shvedova (China) Zhang Shuai (Czech Republic) Petra Kvitová
10 Oct	Tianjin Open; Tianjin, China; WTA International; Hard – $500,000 – 32S/16Q/16D; Singles – Doubles	(China) Peng Shuai; 7–6^{(7–3)}, 6–2	(United States) Alison Riske	(Montenegro) Danka Kovinić (Russia) Svetlana Kuznetsova	(Poland) Agnieszka Radwańska (Puerto Rico) Monica Puig (China) Han Xinyun (Japan) Naomi Osaka
10 Oct	Tianjin Open; Tianjin, China; WTA International; Hard – $500,000 – 32S/16Q/16D; Singles – Doubles	(United States) Christina McHale (China) Peng Shuai; 7–6^{(10–8)}, 6–0	(Poland) Magda Linette (China) Xu Yifan	(Montenegro) Danka Kovinić (Russia) Svetlana Kuznetsova	(Poland) Agnieszka Radwańska (Puerto Rico) Monica Puig (China) Han Xinyun (Japan) Naomi Osaka
10 Oct	Hong Kong Open; Hong Kong; WTA International; Hard – $250,000 – 32S/32Q/16D; Singles – Doubles	(Denmark) Caroline Wozniacki; 6–1, 6–7^{(4–7)}, 6–2	(France) Kristina Mladenovic	(Australia) Daria Gavrilova (Serbia) Jelena Janković	(Germany) Angelique Kerber (United States) Bethanie Mattek-Sands (China) Wang Qiang (France) Alizé Cornet
10 Oct	Hong Kong Open; Hong Kong; WTA International; Hard – $250,000 – 32S/32Q/16D; Singles – Doubles	(Chinese Taipei) Chan Hao-ching (Chinese Taipei) Chan Yung-jan; 6–3, 6–1	(United Kingdom) Naomi Broady (United Kingdom) Heather Watson	(Australia) Daria Gavrilova (Serbia) Jelena Janković	(Germany) Angelique Kerber (United States) Bethanie Mattek-Sands (China) Wang Qiang (France) Alizé Cornet
10 Oct	Linz Open; Linz, Austria; WTA International; Hard (i) – $250,000 – 32S/32Q/16D; Singles – Doubles	(Slovakia) Dominika Cibulková; 6–3, 7–5	(Switzerland) Viktorija Golubic	(United States) Madison Keys (Spain) Carla Suárez Navarro	(Spain) Garbiñe Muguruza (France) Océane Dodin (Czech Republic) Denisa Allertová (Russia) Anastasia Pavlyuchenkova
10 Oct	Linz Open; Linz, Austria; WTA International; Hard (i) – $250,000 – 32S/32Q/16D; Singles – Doubles	(Netherlands) Kiki Bertens (Sweden) Johanna Larsson; 4–6, 6–2, [10–7]	(Germany) Anna-Lena Grönefeld (Czech Republic) Květa Peschke	(United States) Madison Keys (Spain) Carla Suárez Navarro	(Spain) Garbiñe Muguruza (France) Océane Dodin (Czech Republic) Denisa Allertová (Russia) Anastasia Pavlyuchenkova
17 Oct	Kremlin Cup; Moscow, Russia; WTA Premier; Hard (i) – $823,888 – 28S/32Q/16D; Singles – Doubles	(Russia) Svetlana Kuznetsova; 6–2, 6–1	(Australia) Daria Gavrilova	(Ukraine) Elina Svitolina (Germany) Julia Görges	(Hungary) Tímea Babos (Croatia) Ana Konjuh (Russia) Daria Kasatkina (Russia) Anastasia Pavlyuchenkova
17 Oct	Kremlin Cup; Moscow, Russia; WTA Premier; Hard (i) – $823,888 – 28S/32Q/16D; Singles – Doubles	(Czech Republic) Andrea Hlaváčková (Czech Republic) Lucie Hradecká; 4–6, 6–0, [10–7]	(Australia) Daria Gavrilova (Russia) Daria Kasatkina	(Ukraine) Elina Svitolina (Germany) Julia Görges	(Hungary) Tímea Babos (Croatia) Ana Konjuh (Russia) Daria Kasatkina (Russia) Anastasia Pavlyuchenkova
17 Oct	Luxembourg Open; Kockelscheuer, Luxembourg; WTA International; Hard (i) – $250,000 – 32S/32Q/16D; Singles – Doubles	(Romania) Monica Niculescu; 6–4, 6–0	(Czech Republic) Petra Kvitová	(United States) Lauren Davis (Netherlands) Kiki Bertens	(Sweden) Johanna Larsson (Germany) Andrea Petkovic (Czech Republic) Denisa Allertová (Denmark) Caroline Wozniacki
17 Oct	Luxembourg Open; Kockelscheuer, Luxembourg; WTA International; Hard (i) – $250,000 – 32S/32Q/16D; Singles – Doubles	(Netherlands) Kiki Bertens (Sweden) Johanna Larsson; 4–6, 7–5, [11–9]	(Romania) Monica Niculescu (Romania) Patricia Maria Țig	(United States) Lauren Davis (Netherlands) Kiki Bertens	(Sweden) Johanna Larsson (Germany) Andrea Petkovic (Czech Republic) Denisa Allertová (Denmark) Caroline Wozniacki
24 Oct	WTA Finals; Singapore; Year-end championships Hard (i) – $7,000,000 – 8S (RR)/8D; Singles – Doubles	(Slovakia) Dominika Cibulková; 6–3, 6–4	(Germany) Angelique Kerber	(Poland) Agnieszka Radwańska (Russia) Svetlana Kuznetsova	Round Robin (Romania) Simona Halep (United States) Madison Keys (Czech Republic) Karolína Plíšková (Spain) Garbiñe Muguruza
24 Oct	WTA Finals; Singapore; Year-end championships Hard (i) – $7,000,000 – 8S (RR)/8D; Singles – Doubles	(Russia) Ekaterina Makarova (Russia) Elena Vesnina; 7–6^{(7–5)}, 6–3	(United States) Bethanie Mattek-Sands (Czech Republic) Lucie Šafářová	(Poland) Agnieszka Radwańska (Russia) Svetlana Kuznetsova	Round Robin (Romania) Simona Halep (United States) Madison Keys (Czech Republic) Karolína Plíšková (Spain) Garbiñe Muguruza
31 Oct	WTA Elite Trophy; Zhuhai, China; Year-end championships Hard – $2,214,500 – 12S (RR)/6D (RR); Singles – Doubles	(Czech Republic) Petra Kvitová; 6–4, 6–2	(Ukraine) Elina Svitolina	(United Kingdom) Johanna Konta (China) Zhang Shuai	Round robin (France) Caroline Garcia (Australia) Samantha Stosur (Switzerland) Timea Bacsinszky (Hungary) Tímea Babos (Czech Republic) Barbora Strýcová (Italy) Roberta Vinci (Russia) Elena Vesnina (Netherlands) Kiki Bertens
31 Oct	WTA Elite Trophy; Zhuhai, China; Year-end championships Hard – $2,214,500 – 12S (RR)/6D (RR); Singles – Doubles	(Turkey) İpek Soylu (China) Xu Yifan; 6–4, 3–6, [10–7]	(China) Yang Zhaoxuan (China) You Xiaodi	(United Kingdom) Johanna Konta (China) Zhang Shuai	Round robin (France) Caroline Garcia (Australia) Samantha Stosur (Switzerland) Timea Bacsinszky (Hungary) Tímea Babos (Czech Republic) Barbora Strýcová (Italy) Roberta Vinci (Russia) Elena Vesnina (Netherlands) Kiki Bertens

=== November ===
Week	Tournament	Champions	Runners-up	Semifinalists	Quarterfinalists
12–13 Nov	Fed Cup Final; Strasbourg, France – hard (i)	Czech Republic; 3–2	France		

== Statistical information ==
These tables present the number of singles (S), doubles (D), and mixed doubles (X) titles won by each player and each nation during the season, within all the tournament categories of the 2016 WTA Tour: the Grand Slam tournaments, the tennis event at the Rio de Janeiro Summer Olympic Games, the year-end championships (the WTA Tour Championships and the Tournament of Champions), the WTA Premier tournaments (Premier Mandatory, Premier 5, and regular Premier), and the WTA International tournaments. The players/nations are sorted by: 1) total number of titles (a doubles title won by two players representing the same nation counts as only one win for the nation); 2) cumulated importance of those titles (one Grand Slam win equalling two Premier Mandatory/Premier 5 wins, one year-end championships win equalling one-and-a-half Premier Mandatory/Premier 5 win, one Premier Mandatory/Premier 5 win equalling two Premier wins, one Olympic win equalling one-and-a-half Premier win, one Premier win equalling two International wins); 3) a singles > doubles > mixed doubles hierarchy; 4) alphabetical order (by family names for players).

=== Key ===
Grand Slam tournaments
Summer Olympic Games
Year-end championships
WTA Premier Mandatory
WTA Premier 5
WTA Premier
WTA International

=== Titles won by player ===
Total	Player	Grand Slam			Olympic Games			Year-end		Premier Mandatory		Premier 5		Premier		International		Total		
Total	Player	S	D	X	S	D	X	S	D	S	D	S	D	S	D	S	D	S	D	X
8	Sania Mirza (IND)		●										● ●		● ● ● ● ●			0	8	0
6	Martina Hingis (SUI)		●	●									●		● ● ●			0	5	1
6	Bethanie Mattek-Sands (USA)		●				●				● ● ●		●					0	5	1
6	Caroline Garcia (FRA)		●								●				● ●	● ●		2	4	0
5	Lucie Šafářová (CZE)		●								● ●		●			●		1	4	0
4	Kristina Mladenovic (FRA)		●								●				● ●			0	4	0
4	Elena Vesnina (RUS)			●		●			●				●					0	3	1
4	Dominika Cibulková (SVK)							●						●		● ●		4	0	0
4	Monica Niculescu (ROU)														●	●	● ●	1	3	0
4	Andrea Hlaváčková (CZE)														●		● ● ●	0	4	0
4	Kiki Bertens (NED)															●	● ● ●	1	3	0
4	Peng Shuai (CHN)															●	● ● ●	1	3	0
4	Johanna Larsson (SWE)																● ● ● ●	0	4	0
3	Angelique Kerber (GER)	● ●												●				3	0	0
3	Serena Williams (USA)	●	●									●						2	1	0
3	Ekaterina Makarova (RUS)					●			●				●					0	3	0
3	İpek Soylu (TUR)								●								● ●	0	3	0
3	Victoria Azarenka (BLR)									● ●				●				3	0	0
3	Simona Halep (ROU)									●		●				●		3	0	0
3	Agnieszka Radwańska (POL)									●				●		●		3	0	0
3	Karolína Plíšková (CZE)											●			●	●		2	1	0
3	Barbora Strýcová (CZE)												●		● ●			0	3	0
3	Chan Hao-ching (TPE)												●				● ●	0	3	0
3	Chan Yung-jan (TPE)												●				● ●	0	3	0
3	Sloane Stephens (USA)													●		● ●		3	0	0
3	Lara Arruabarrena (ESP)															●	● ●	1	2	0
3	Christina McHale (USA)															●	● ●	1	2	0
3	Anabel Medina Garrigues (ESP)																● ● ●	0	3	0
3	Arantxa Parra Santonja (ESP)																● ● ●	0	3	0
2	Venus Williams (USA)		●													●		1	1	0
2	Laura Siegemund (GER)			●												●		1	0	1
2	Heather Watson (GBR)			●												●		1	0	1
2	Petra Kvitová (CZE)							●				●						2	0	0
2	Coco Vandeweghe (USA)										●					●		1	1	0
2	Svetlana Kuznetsova (RUS)													● ●				2	0	0
2	Caroline Wozniacki (DEN)													●		●		2	0	0
2	Darija Jurak (CRO)														● ●			0	2	0
2	Lucie Hradecká (CZE)														●		●	0	2	0
2	Yanina Wickmayer (BEL)															●	●	1	1	0
2	Xenia Knoll (SUI)																● ●	0	2	0
2	Andreea Mitu (ROU)																● ●	0	2	0
2	Varatchaya Wongteanchai (THA)																● ●	0	2	0
1	Garbiñe Muguruza (ESP)	●																1	0	0
1	Monica Puig (PUR)				●													1	0	0
1	Xu Yifan (CHN)								●									0	1	0
1	Carla Suárez Navarro (ESP)											●						1	0	0
1	Sara Errani (ITA)													●				1	0	0
1	Madison Keys (USA)													●				1	0	0
1	Johanna Konta (GBR)													●				1	0	0
1	Roberta Vinci (ITA)													●				1	0	0
1	Raquel Atawo (USA)														●			0	1	0
1	Chuang Chia-jung (TPE)														●			0	1	0
1	Anastasia Rodionova (AUS)														●			0	1	0
1	Abigail Spears (USA)														●			0	1	0
1	Timea Bacsinszky (SUI)															●		1	0	0
1	Irina-Camelia Begu (ROU)															●		1	0	0
1	Çağla Büyükakçay (TUR)															●		1	0	0
1	Alizé Cornet (FRA)															●		1	0	0
1	Océane Dodin (FRA)															●		1	0	0
1	Duan Yingying (CHN)															●		1	0	0
1	Irina Falconi (USA)															●		1	0	0
1	Viktorija Golubic (SUI)															●		1	0	0
1	Kristýna Plíšková (CZE)															●		1	0	0
1	Francesca Schiavone (ITA)															●		1	0	0
1	Elina Svitolina (UKR)															●		1	0	0
1	Lesia Tsurenko (UKR)															●		1	0	0
1	Shuko Aoyama (JPN)																●	0	1	0
1	Verónica Cepede Royg (PAR)																●	0	1	0
1	Gabriela Dabrowski (CAN)																●	0	1	0
1	Kirsten Flipkens (BEL)																●	0	1	0
1	Margarita Gasparyan (RUS)																●	0	1	0
1	Han Xinyun (CHN)																●	0	1	0
1	Eri Hozumi (JPN)																●	0	1	0
1	María Irigoyen (ARG)																●	0	1	0
1	Miyu Kato (JPN)																●	0	1	0
1	Oksana Kalashnikova (GEO)																●	0	1	0
1	Lyudmyla Kichenok (UKR)																●	0	1	0
1	Nadiia Kichenok (UKR)																●	0	1	0
1	Vania King (USA)																●	0	1	0
1	Aleksandra Krunić (SRB)																●	0	1	0
1	Liang Chen (CHN)																●	0	1	0
1	Lu Jingjing (CHN)																●	0	1	0
1	Tatjana Maria (GER)																●	0	1	0
1	María José Martínez Sánchez (ESP)																●	0	1	0
1	Elise Mertens (BEL)																●	0	1	0
1	An-Sophie Mestach (BEL)																●	0	1	0
1	Jessica Moore (AUS)																●	0	1	0
1	Asia Muhammad (USA)																●	0	1	0
1	Makoto Ninomiya (JPN)																●	0	1	0
1	Raluca Olaru (ROU)																●	0	1	0
1	Alicja Rosolska (POL)																●	0	1	0
1	Yaroslava Shvedova (KAZ)																●	0	1	0
1	Yang Zhaoxuan (CHN)																●	0	1	0

=== Titles won by nation ===
Total	Nation	Grand Slam			Olympic Games			Year-end		Premier Mandatory		Premier 5		Premier		International		Total		
Total	Nation	S	D	X	S	D	X	S	D	S	D	S	D	S	D	S	D	S	D	X
22	United States (USA)	1	2				1				3	1	1	2	1	6	4	10	11	1
17	Czech Republic (CZE)		1					1			2	2	2		3	3	3	6	11	0
11	Romania (ROU)									1		1			1	3	5	5	6	0
10	Switzerland (SUI)		1	1									1		3	2	2	2	7	1
10	China (CHN)								1							2	7	2	8	0
9	Spain (ESP)	1										1				1	6	3	6	0
8	France (FRA)		1								1				2	4		4	4	0
8	India (IND)		1										2		5			0	8	0
7	Russia (RUS)			1		1			1				1	2			1	2	4	1
6	Germany (GER)	2		1										1		1	1	4	1	1
4	Slovakia (SVK)							1						1		2		4	0	0
4	Turkey (TUR)								1							1	2	1	3	0
4	Poland (POL)									1				1		1	1	3	1	0
4	Chinese Taipei (TPE)												1		1		2	0	4	0
4	Belgium (BEL)															1	3	1	3	0
4	Netherlands (NED)															1	3	1	3	0
4	Sweden (SWE)																4	0	4	0
3	Great Britain (GBR)			1										1		1		2	0	1
3	Belarus (BLR)									2				1				3	0	0
3	Italy (ITA)													2		1		3	0	0
3	Ukraine (UKR)															2	1	2	1	0
2	Denmark (DEN)													1		1		2	0	0
2	Croatia (CRO)														2			0	2	0
2	Australia (AUS)														1		1	0	2	0
2	Japan (JPN)																2	0	2	0
2	Thailand (THA)																2	0	2	0
1	Puerto Rico (PUR)				1													1	0	0
1	Argentina (ARG)																1	0	1	0
1	Canada (CAN)																1	0	1	0
1	Georgia (GEO)																1	0	1	0
1	Kazakhstan (KAZ)																1	0	1	0
1	Paraguay (PAR)																1	0	1	0
1	Serbia (SRB)																1	0	1	0

=== Titles information ===
The following players won their first main circuit title in singles, doubles, or mixed doubles:

Singles

- (United States) Irina Falconi – Bogotá (draw)
- (Turkey) Çağla Büyükakçay – İstanbul (draw)
- (Switzerland) Viktorija Golubic – Gstaad (draw)
- (Germany) Laura Siegemund – Båstad (draw)
- (United Kingdom) Johanna Konta – Stanford (draw)
- (China) Duan Yingying – Nanchang (draw)
- (United States) Christina McHale – Tokyo (draw)
- (France) Océane Dodin – Quebec City (draw)
- (Czech Republic) Kristýna Plíšková – Tashkent (draw)
- (China) Peng Shuai – Tianjin (draw)

Doubles

- (Belgium) Elise Mertens – Auckland (draw)
- (China) Han Xinyun – Hobart (draw)
- (United States) Christina McHale – Hobart (draw)
- (Paraguay) Verónica Cepede Royg – Rio de Janeiro (draw)
- (Thailand) Varatchaya Wongteanchai – Kuala Lumpur (draw)
- (China) Yang Zhaoxuan – Kuala Lumpur (draw)
- (United States) CoCo Vandeweghe – Indian Wells (draw)
- (Japan) Eri Hozumi – Katowice (draw)
- (Japan) Miyu Kato – Katowice (draw)
- (Romania) Andreea Mitu – İstanbul (draw)
- (Turkey) İpek Soylu – İstanbul (draw)
- (Switzerland) Xenia Knoll – Rabat (draw)
- (Australia) Jessica Moore – Bucharest (draw)
- (China) Lu Jingjing – Nanchang (draw)
- (Japan) Makoto Ninomiya – Tokyo (draw)
- (Belgium) Kirsten Flipkens – Seoul (draw)

Mixed doubles

- (Russia) Elena Vesnina – Australian Open (draw)
- (United Kingdom) Heather Watson – Wimbledon (draw)
- (Germany) Laura Siegemund – US Open (draw)

The following players defended a main circuit title in singles, doubles, or mixed doubles:

Singles

- (Germany) Angelique Kerber – Stuttgart (draw)
- (United States) Serena Williams – Wimbledon (draw)
- (Russia) Svetlana Kuznetsova – Moscow (draw)

Doubles

- (Switzerland) Martina Hingis – Brisbane (draw)
- (India) Sania Mirza – Sydney (draw)

=== Top 10 entry ===
The following players entered the top 10 for the first time in their careers:

Singles

- (Switzerland) Belinda Bencic (enters at #9 on February 15)
- (Italy) Roberta Vinci (enters at #10 on February 22)
- (United States) Madison Keys (enters at #10 on June 20)
- (United Kingdom) Johanna Konta (enters at #9 on October 10)

Doubles

- (France) Caroline Garcia (enters at #9 on May 9)

== WTA rankings ==
These are the WTA rankings of the top 20 singles players, doubles players, and the top 10 doubles teams on the WTA Tour, of the 2016 season.

=== Singles ===
WTA Championships Race Rankings, Final rankings
#	Player	Points	Tours
1	Angelique Kerber (GER)	8,000	20
2	Serena Williams (USA)	7,050	7
3	Agnieszka Radwańska (POL)	4,975	19
4	Simona Halep (ROU)	4,728	17
5	Karolína Plíšková (CZE)	4,100	21
6	Garbiñe Muguruza (ESP)	3,736	19
7	Madison Keys (USA)	3,637	15
8	Dominika Cibulková (SVK)	3,625	21
9	Svetlana Kuznetsova (RUS)	3,490	20
10	Johanna Konta (GBR)	3,455	22
11	Carla Suárez Navarro (ESP)	3,170	22
12	Petra Kvitová (CZE)	2,840	20
13	Elina Svitolina (UKR)	2,456	22
14	Venus Williams (USA)	2,241	17
15	Caroline Wozniacki (DEN)	2,240	22
16	Roberta Vinci (ITA)	2,190	22
17	Timea Bacsinszky (SUI)	2,188	18
18	Elena Vesnina (RUS)	2,094	19
19	Samantha Stosur (AUS)	2,090	20
20	Barbora Strýcová (CZE)	2,070	21

Champion

Player competed at the 2016 WTA Finals
Player qualified but did not compete at the 2016 WTA Finals

WTA Singles Year-End Rankings
#	Player	Points	#Trn	'15 Rk	High	Low	'15→'16
1	Angelique Kerber (GER)	9,080	21	10	1	10	▲9
2	Serena Williams (USA)	7,050	14	1	1	2	▼1
3	Agnieszka Radwańska (POL)	5,600	20	5	2	5	▲2
4	Simona Halep (ROU)	5,228	18	2	2	5	▼2
5	Dominika Cibulková (SVK)	4,875	23	38	5	66	▲33
6	Karolína Plíšková (CZE)	4,600	22	11	5	19	▲5
7	Garbiñe Muguruza (ESP)	4,236	20	3	2	7	▼4
8	Madison Keys (USA)	4,137	16	18	7	25	▲10
9	Svetlana Kuznetsova (RUS)	4,115	21	25	8	25	▲16
10	Johanna Konta (GBR)	3,640	23	47	9	47	▲37
11	Petra Kvitová (CZE)	3,485	22	6	6	16	▼5
12	Carla Suárez Navarro (ESP)	3,070	23	13	6	14	▲1
13	Victoria Azarenka (BLR)	3,061	12	22	5	22	▲9
14	Elina Svitolina (UKR)	2,895	23	19	14	21	▲5
15	Timea Bacsinszky (SUI)	2,347	19	12	9	21	▼3
16	Elena Vesnina (RUS)	2,252	20	111	16	122	▲95
17	Venus Williams (USA)	2,240	17	7	6	17	▼10
18	Roberta Vinci (ITA)	2,210	23	15	7	18	▼3
19	Caroline Wozniacki (DEN)	2,185	22	17	17	74	▼2
20	Barbora Strýcová (CZE)	2,170	22	41	19	48	▲21

==== Number 1 ranking ====
Holder	Date gained	Date forfeited
Serena Williams (USA)	Year end 2015	11 September 2016
Angelique Kerber (GER)	12 September 2016	Year end 2016

=== Doubles ===
WTA Championships Race Rankings As of October 24, 2016
#	Team	Points	Tours
1	Caroline Garcia (FRA); Kristina Mladenovic (FRA)	7,360	16
2	Martina Hingis (SUI); Sania Mirza (IND)	6,315	14
3	Bethanie Mattek-Sands (USA); Lucie Šafářová (CZE)	5,226	8
4	Elena Vesnina (RUS); Ekaterina Makarova (RUS)	4,495	9
5	Andrea Hlaváčková (CZE); Lucie Hradecká (CZE)	4,140	17
6	Chan Hao-ching (TPE); Chan Yung-jan (TPE)	4,115	20
7	Yaroslava Shvedova (KAZ); Tímea Babos (HUN)	3,975	12
8	Julia Görges (GER); Karolína Plíšková (CZE)	3,485	11
9	Raquel Atawo (USA); Abigail Spears (USA)	2,700	21
10	Xu Yifan (CHN); Zheng Saisai (CHN)	2,670	20

Team has qualified for the 2016 WTA Finals

WTA rankings (Doubles), Final rankings
#	Player	Points	Prev	Move^{‡}
1	Sania Mirza (IND)	7,815	1	Steady
2	Caroline Garcia (FRA)	7,360	4	▲2
2	Kristina Mladenovic (FRA)	7,360	3	▲1
4	Martina Hingis (SUI)	7,300	2	▼2
5	Bethanie Mattek-Sands (USA)	6,735	5	Steady
6	Lucie Šafářová (CZE)	5,422	6	Steady
7	Elena Vesnina (RUS)	5,315	7	Steady
8	Ekaterina Makarova (RUS)	4,721	8	Steady
9	Andrea Hlaváčková (CZE)	4,300	11	▲2
10	Lucie Hradecká (CZE)	4,140	14	▲4
11	Chan Hao-ching (TPE)	4,115	9	▼2
11	Chan Yung-jan (TPE)	4,115	9	▼2
13	Yaroslava Shvedova (KAZ)	4,075	13	Steady
14	Karolína Plíšková (CZE)	4,040	15	▲1
15	Tímea Babos (HUN)	3,980	12	▼3
16	Barbora Strýcová (CZE)	3,965	16	Steady
17	Julia Görges (GER)	3,840	17	Steady
18	CoCo Vandeweghe (USA)	3,226	19	▲1
19	Monica Niculescu (ROU)	3,225	18	▼1
20	Xu Yifan (CHN)	2,760	22	▲2

==== Number 1 ranking ====
Holder	Date gained	Date forfeited
Sania Mirza (IND)	Year end 2015	17 January 2016
Martina Hingis (SUI); Sania Mirza (IND)	18 January 2016	21 August 2016
Sania Mirza (IND)	22 August 2016	Year end 2016

== Prize money leaders ==
Angelique Kerber topped the 2016 money list and joined Serena Williams as the only two women to ever win over $10,000,000 in a single season. Additionally, Kerber became the 15th WTA player to win $20,000,000 in career earnings. The top-32 players earned over $1,000,000. Bethanie Mattek-Sands won $1,088,600 in doubles tournaments. It was the 3rd consecutive year that a player earned over $1,000,000 in doubles events.

#	Player	Singles	Doubles	Mixed	Year-to-date
1	Angelique Kerber (GER)	$9,841,181	$20,434	$0	$10,136,615
2	Serena Williams (USA)	$7,384,429	$290,601	$0	$7,675,030
3	Simona Halep (ROU)	$3,590,480	$40,428	$2,345	$4,333,253
4	Agnieszka Radwańska (POL)	$3,762,193	$0	$0	$4,162,193
5	Karolína Plíšková (CZE)	$3,375,673	$375,420	$0	$3,976,093
6	Dominika Cibulková (SVK)	$3,912,431	$28,002	$0	$3,940,433
7	Garbiñe Muguruza (ESP)	$3,287,124	$16,264	$0	$3,903,388
8	Victoria Azarenka (BLR)	$2,651,080	$0	$0	$2,651,080
9	Petra Kvitová (CZE)	$2,182,099	$18,417	$0	$2,500,516
10	Svetlana Kuznetsova (RUS)	$2,260,009	$136,470	$0	$2,396,479
prize money given in US$; as of November 7, 2016

== Statistics leaders ==
as of November 7, 2016

Aces
	Player	Aces	Matches
1	(Czech Republic) Karolína Plíšková	530	61
2	(United States) Serena Williams	324	44
3	(United States) Madison Keys	300	63
4	(United Kingdom) Johanna Konta	284	68
5	(Czech Republic) Kristýna Plíšková	274	24
6	(Hungary) Tímea Babos	269	63
7	(United States) CoCo Vandeweghe	232	40
8	(Czech Republic) Petra Kvitová	223	66
9	(France) Caroline Garcia	218	55
10	(Russia) Svetlana Kuznetsova	215	65

Double faults
	Player	DFs	Matches
1	(France) Kristina Mladenovic	263	58
2	(Latvia) Jeļena Ostapenko	259	43
3	(Czech Republic) Petra Kvitová	252	66
4	(Italy) Camila Giorgi	237	34
5	(Slovakia) Dominika Cibulková	233	74
6	(Australia) Samantha Stosur	231	50
7	(Hungary) Tímea Babos	229	63
8	(France) Alizé Cornet	225	42
9	(Puerto Rico) Monica Puig	212	65
10	(Russia) Anastasia Pavlyuchenkova	205	50

First-serve percentage
	Player	%	Matches
1	(Italy) Sara Errani	84.8	43
2	(Germany) Annika Beck	72.2	48
3	(Romania) Monica Niculescu	71.8	43
4	(Germany) Laura Siegemund	70.5	48
5	(Kazakhstan) Yulia Putintseva	70.5	51
6	(Japan) Kurumi Nara	70.0	31
7	(United States) Madison Brengle	68.9	39
8	(Switzerland) Timea Bacsinszky	68.6	51
9	(Switzerland) Viktorija Golubic	67.8	28
10	(Spain) Carla Suárez Navarro	67.6	58

Second-serve percentage
	Player	%	Matches
1	(Italy) Francesca Schiavone	47.9	26
2	(Montenegro) Danka Kovinić	47.0	40
3	(United States) CoCo Vandeweghe	46.2	40
4	(Croatia) Ana Konjuh	45.7	26
5	(Croatia) Mirjana Lučić-Baroni	45.1	32
6	(Japan) Naomi Osaka	45.1	33
7	(Latvia) Jeļena Ostapenko	44.7	42
8	(Latvia) Anastasija Sevastova	44.6	41
9	(Italy) Camila Giorgi	43.4	34
10	(Germany) Julia Görges	43.1	41

First-serve points won
	Player	%	Matches
1	(United States) Serena Williams	75.7	41
2	(Czech Republic) Karolína Plíšková	73.9	61
3	(Belarus) Victoria Azarenka	72.2	27
4	(United States) CoCo Vandeweghe	72.1	40
5	(United Kingdom) Naomi Broady	71.3	25
6	(Czech Republic) Lucie Šafářová	71.0	31
7	(Germany) Julia Görges	70.5	41
8	(United States) Madison Keys	69.4	57
9	(Japan) Naomi Osaka	69.2	33
10	(Czech Republic) Petra Kvitová	69.1	60

Second-serve points won
	Player	%	Matches
1	(United Kingdom) Johanna Konta	52.7	64
2	(United States) Madison Keys	50.6	57
3	(United States) Serena Williams	50.2	41
4	(Romania) Simona Halep	50.2	59
5	(Czech Republic) Petra Kvitová	50.1	60
6	(France) Caroline Garcia	50.0	53
7	(United States) Shelby Rogers	49.9	28
8	(Switzerland) Viktorija Golubic	49.3	28
9	(Germany) Angelique Kerber	49.2	71
10	(United States) Sloane Stephens	49.0	30

Service points won
	Player	%	Matches
1	(United States) Serena Williams	65.8	44
2	(Belarus) Victoria Azarenka	63.3	27
3	(United States) Madison Keys	62.5	63
4	(United Kingdom) Johanna Konta	62.0	68
5	(Czech Republic) Lucie Šafářová	61.8	33
6	(Czech Republic) Petra Kvitová	61.8	66
7	(Czech Republic) Karolína Plíšková	61.6	61
8	(United States) CoCo Vandeweghe	61.3	40
9	(Germany) Julia Görges	61.0	41
10	(Japan) Naomi Osaka	59.7	33

Return points won
	Player	%	Matches
1	(Belarus) Victoria Azarenka	51.0	27
2	(Poland) Agnieszka Radwańska	49.2	71
3	(Romania) Monica Niculescu	49.2	43
4	(Romania) Simona Halep	49.0	59
5	(Italy) Sara Errani	47.6	43
6	(United States) Serena Williams	47.4	44
7	(Germany) Angelique Kerber	47.1	71
8	(Slovakia) Dominika Cibulková	46.9	73
9	(Switzerland) Timea Bacsinszky	46.8	51
10	(Croatia) Mirjana Lučić-Baroni	46.6	32

Service games won
	Player	%	Matches
1	(United States) Serena Williams	83.8	44
2	(Belarus) Victoria Azarenka	79.7	27
3	(United States) Madison Keys	77.6	63
4	(Czech Republic) Karolína Plíšková	75.9	61
5	(Czech Republic) Lucie Šafářová	75.7	33
6	(Czech Republic) Petra Kvitová	75.6	66
7	(United Kingdom) Johanna Konta	75.4	39
8	(Germany) Julia Görges	74.5	41
9	(United States) CoCo Vandeweghe	73.3	40
10	(Spain) Garbiñe Muguruza	72.5	51

Return games won
	Player	%	Matches
1	(Belarus) Victoria Azarenka	51.2	27
2	(Poland) Agnieszka Radwańska	48.8	70
3	(Romania) Monica Niculescu	48.3	42
4	(Romania) Simona Halep	47.2	59
5	(Italy) Sara Errani	44.7	40
6	(Germany) Annika Beck	43.6	47
7	(Germany) Angelique Kerber	43.2	71
8	(Slovakia) Dominika Cibulková	43.2	73
9	(United States) Serena Williams	42.7	41
10	(Croatia) Mirjana Lučić-Baroni	42.6	32

Break points saved
	Player	%	Matches
1	(Belarus) Victoria Azarenka	66.4	27
2	(United States) Serena Williams	63.7	44
3	(Switzerland) Belinda Bencic	59.9	39
4	(Czech Republic) Karolína Plíšková	59.9	61
5	(United States) Madison Keys	59.8	63
6	(United Kingdom) Johanna Konta	59.7	68
7	(Spain) Garbiñe Muguruza	59.3	51
8	(Germany) Julia Görges	59.3	41
9	(Kazakhstan) Yaroslava Shvedova	59.3	34
10	(Australia) Daria Gavrilova	59.1	47

Break points converted
	Player	%	Matches
1	(Poland) Agnieszka Radwańska	54.7	71
2	(Japan) Nao Hibino	54.6	37
3	(Ukraine) Lesia Tsurenko	52.9	38
4	(Denmark) Caroline Wozniacki	52.6	51
5	(United States) Madison Brengle	51.8	39
6	(Germany) Annika Beck	51.4	48
7	(Czech Republic) Barbora Strýcová	51.1	60
8	(United States) Shelby Rogers	51.1	28
9	(China) Zhang Shuai	51.1	45
10	(Japan) Kurumi Nara	50.9	31

== Points distribution ==
Category	W	F	SF	QF	R16	R32	R64	R128	Q	Q3	Q2	Q1
Grand Slam (S)	2000	1300	780	430	240	130	70	10	40	30	20	2
Grand Slam (D)	2000	1300	780	430	240	130	10	–	48	–	–	–
WTA Finals (S)	1500*	1080*	750*	(+125 per round robin match; +125 per round robin win)								
WTA Finals (D)	1500	1080	750	375	–							
WTA Premier Mandatory (96S)	1000	650	390	215	120	65	35	10	30	–	20	2
WTA Premier Mandatory (64/60S)	1000	650	390	215	120	65	10	–	30	–	20	2
WTA Premier Mandatory (28/32D)	1000	650	390	215	120	10	–	–	–	–	–	–
WTA Premier 5 (56S)	900	585	350	190	105	60	1	–	30	20	12	1
WTA Premier 5 (28D)	900	585	350	190	105	1	–	–	–	–	–	–
WTA Premier (56S)	470	305	185	100	55	30	1	–	12	–	8	1
WTA Premier (32S)	470	305	185	100	55	1	–	–	25	16	10	1
WTA Premier (16D)	470	305	185	100	1	–	–	–	–	–	–	–
WTA Elite Trophy (S)	700*	440*	240*	(+40 per round robin match; +80 per round robin win)								
WTA International (56S)	280	180	110	60	30	15	1	–	10	–	6	1
WTA International (32S)	280	180	110	60	30	1	–	–	18	14	10	1
WTA International (16D)	280	180	110	60	1	–	–	–	–	–	–	–

* Assumes undefeated round robin match record.

== WTA fan polls ==
=== Player of the month ===
Month	Winner	Other candidates
January	Angelique Kerber (GER) (41%)	(United States) Serena Williams (28%) (Poland) Agnieszka Radwańska (21%) (Belarus) Victoria Azarenka (10%)
February	Carla Suárez Navarro (ESP) (44%)	(Italy) Roberta Vinci (40%) (Italy) Sara Errani (16%)
March	Victoria Azarenka (BLR) (70%)	(Russia) Svetlana Kuznetsova (17%) (United States) Serena Williams (13%)
April	Angelique Kerber (GER) (54%)	(Germany) Laura Siegemund (27%) (United States) Sloane Stephens (19%)
May	Garbiñe Muguruza (ESP) (70%)	(Romania) Simona Halep (20%) (United States) Serena Williams (10%)
June	Serena Williams (USA) (62%)	(Slovakia) Dominika Cibulková (21%) (Germany) Angelique Kerber (14%) (United States) Madison Keys (3%)
July	Simona Halep (ROU) (84%)	(United States) Venus Williams (9%) (United Kingdom) Johanna Konta (5%) (United States) Madison Keys (2%)
August	Monica Puig (PUR) (97%)	(Germany) Angelique Kerber (2%) (Czech Republic) Karolína Plíšková (1%)
September	Petra Kvitová (CZE) (55%)	(Denmark) Caroline Wozniacki (34%) (Japan) Naomi Osaka (1%)
October	Dominika Cibulková (SVK) (55%)	(Poland) Agnieszka Radwańska (33%) (Germany) Angelique Kerber (12%)

=== Breakthrough of the month ===
Month	Winner	Other candidates
January	Zhang Shuai (CHN) (44%)	(United Kingdom) Johanna Konta (31%) (Australia) Daria Gavrilova (17%) (Russia) Daria Kasatkina (6%) (United States) Samantha Crawford (2%)
February	Jeļena Ostapenko (LAT) (50%)	(Russia) Daria Kasatkina (23%) (France) Caroline Garcia (15%) (China) Zheng Saisai (12%)
March	Nicole Gibbs (USA) (64%)	(Hungary) Tímea Babos (16%) (Russia) Daria Kasatkina (15%) (Japan) Naomi Osaka (4%)
April	Çağla Büyükakçay (TUR) (92%)	(Germany) Laura Siegemund (5%) (United States) Irina Falconi (3%)
May	Kiki Bertens (NED) (69%)	(United States) Shelby Rogers (16%) (Kazakhstan) Yulia Putintseva (12%) (United States) Louisa Chirico (3%)
June	Elena Vesnina (RUS) (62%)	(United States) Madison Keys (31%) (Latvia) Anastasija Sevastova (7%)
July	Kristína Kučová (SVK) (49%)	(United Kingdom) Johanna Konta (34%) (Germany) Laura Siegemund (12%) (Switzerland) Viktorija Golubic (5%)
August	Karolína Plíšková (CZE) (64%)	(Latvia) Anastasija Sevastova (18%) (Croatia) Ana Konjuh (18%)
September	Naomi Osaka (JPN) (45%)	(Czech Republic) Kristýna Plíšková (40%) (France) Océane Dodin (9%) (United States) Christina McHale (6%)
October	Peng Shuai (CHN) (70%)	(United Kingdom) Johanna Konta (23%) (Australia) Daria Gavrilova (8%)

=== Shot of the month ===
Month	Winner	Other candidates
January	Caroline Wozniacki (DEN) (42%)	(Romania) Simona Halep (28%) (Canada) Eugenie Bouchard (16%) (Russia) Svetlana Kuznetsova (8%) (Belarus) Victoria Azarenka (6%)
February	Agnieszka Radwańska (POL) (84%)	(Serbia) Jelena Janković (6%) (Ukraine) Elina Svitolina (4%) (Spain) Garbiñe Muguruza (3%) (Switzerland) Belinda Bencic (3%)
March	Agnieszka Radwańska (POL) (55%)	(Romania) Simona Halep (33%) (Italy) Camila Giorgi (5%) (United States) Serena Williams (4%) (Germany) Angelique Kerber (3%)
April	Monica Niculescu (ROU) (79%)	(Germany) Angelique Kerber (9%) (Italy) Sara Errani (5%) (Germany) Laura Siegemund (5%) (France) Caroline Garcia (2%)
May	Simona Halep (ROU) (70%)	(Romania) Irina-Camelia Begu (12%) (United States) Serena Williams (7%) (Spain) Garbiñe Muguruza (6%) (Spain) Carla Suárez Navarro (5%)
June	Agnieszka Radwańska (POL) (77%)	(Germany) Angelique Kerber (8%) (Australia) Samantha Stosur (6%) (France) Kristina Mladenovic (5%) (United States) Madison Keys (3%)
July	Simona Halep (ROU) (79%)	(Canada) Eugenie Bouchard (9%) (Germany) Angelique Kerber (6%) (Russia) Anastasia Pavlyuchenkova (3%) (United Kingdom) Johanna Konta (3%)
August	Agnieszka Radwańska (POL) (67%)	(Germany) Angelique Kerber (19%) (Canada) Eugenie Bouchard (9%) (Ukraine) Elina Svitolina (3%) (United Kingdom) Johanna Konta (2%)
September	(Belgium) Kirsten Flipkens (47%)	(Poland) Agnieszka Radwańska (39%) (Romania) Simona Halep (6%) (Denmark) Caroline Wozniacki (4%) (Germany) Angelique Kerber (3%)
October	Angelique Kerber (GER) (74%)	(Poland) Agnieszka Radwańska (11%) (Slovakia) Dominika Cibulkovà (6%) (Australia) Daria Gavrilova (6%) (United States) Madison Keys (3%)

== Retirements ==
Following is a list of notable players (winners of a main tour title, and/or part of the WTA rankings top 100 (singles) or (doubles) for at least one week) who announced their retirement from professional tennis, became inactive (after not playing for more than 52 weeks), or were permanently banned from playing, during the 2016 season:

- Sofia Arvidsson (born 16 February 1984, in Halmstad, Sweden) – She decided to retire in January 2016 at the age of 31.
- (Czech Republic) Gabriela Chmelinová (born 2 June 1976 in Prague, Czechoslovakia) – Chmelinová announced her retirement from professional tennis in 2016.
- Lourdes Domínguez Lino (born 31 March 1981 in Pontevedra, Spain) – She decided to retire in November 2016 at the age of 35.
- Maureen Drake (born 21 March 1971 in Toronto, Canada) – She announced her second and permanent retirement from professional tennis in August 2016.
- Janette Husárová (born 4 June 1974 in Bratislava, Slovakia) – In February 2016 Husárová announced her retirement from professional tennis.
- (Serbia) Ana Ivanovic (born 6 November 1987 in Belgrade, Serbia) – The former world number 1 announced her retirement from professional tennis December 2016.
- Klaudia Jans-Ignacik (born 24 September 1984 in Gdynia, Poland) – She announced her retirement from professional tennis in August 2016.
- Mathilde Johansson (born 28 April 1985, in Boulogne-Billancourt, France) – Johansson played her final match in the singles 2016 French Open qualifications.
- Sandra Klemenschits (born 13 November 1982 in Salzburg, Austria) – She announced her retirement from professional tennis in October 2016.
- Maria Kondratieva (born 17 January 1982 in Moscow, Russia) – Kondratieva announced her retirement from professional tennis in 2016.
- Klára Koukalová (born 24 February 1982 in Prague, Czech Republic) – She announced her retirement from professional tennis in September 2016.
- Petra Rampre (born 20 January 1980 in Ljubljana, Slovenia) – Rampre announced her retirement from professional tennis in 2016.
- (Thailand) Tamarine Tanasugarn (born 24 May 1977, in Los Angeles, United States) – She announced her retirement from professional tennis in June 2016.
- (Czech Republic) Vladimíra Uhlířová (born 4 May 1978 in České Budějovice, Czechoslovakia) – She announced her retirement from professional tennis in January 2016.
- (Czech Republic) Nicole Vaidišová (born 23 April 1989 in Nuremberg, West Germany) – She announced her second and permanent retirement from professional tennis in July 2016.
- Stephanie Vogt (born 15 February 1990 in Vaduz, Liechtenstein) – She announced her retirement from professional tennis in August 2016.
- (Hong Kong) Yan Zi (born 12 November 1984 in Sichuan, China) – Yan Zi announced her retirement from professional tennis in 2016.

== See also ==
- 2016 ATP World Tour
- 2016 WTA 125K series
- 2016 ITF Women's Circuit
- Women's Tennis Association
- International Tennis Federation
