= 2016 Porsche Tennis Grand Prix – Doubles =

Doubles
- 2016 Porsche Tennis Grand Prix

Final
- Champions: (France) Caroline Garcia (France) Kristina Mladenovic
- Runners-up: (Switzerland) Martina Hingis (India) Sania Mirza
- Score: 2–6, 6–1, [10–6]

Details
- Draw: 16
- Seeds: 4

Events
| Singles | Doubles |
- Porsche Tennis Grand Prix

Bethanie Mattek-Sands and Lucie Šafářová were the defending champions, but Mattek-Sands chose not to participate this year. Šafářová played alongside Sabine Lisicki, but lost in the semifinals to Martina Hingis and Sania Mirza.
Caroline Garcia and Kristina Mladenovic won the title, defeating Hingis and Mirza in the final, 2–6, 6–1, [10–6].

== Seeds ==
1. (Switzerland) Martina Hingis / (India) Sania Mirza (final)
2. (France) Caroline Garcia / (France) Kristina Mladenovic (champions)
3. (Slovenia) Andreja Klepač / (Slovenia) Katarina Srebotnik (quarterfinals)
4. (United States) Raquel Atawo / (Poland) Alicja Rosolska (first round)

== Draw ==
Key

- Q = Qualifier
- WC = Wild card
- LL = Lucky loser
- Alt = Alternate
- ITF = ITF entry
- PR = Protected ranking
- SR = Special ranking
- SE = Special exempt
- JE = Junior exempt
- JR = Junior Accelerator Programme entrant
- CO = College Accelerator Programme entrant
- NG = Next Gen Accelerator Program entrant
- w/o = Walkover
- r = Retired
- d = Defaulted

First round
1 | (Switzerland) M Hingis (India) S Mirza | 6 | 6
(Japan) E Hozumi (Japan) M Kato | 1 | 1
(Czech Republic) B Krejčíková (Czech Republic) K Siniaková | 6 | 3 | [10]
(Canada) G Dabrowski (Spain) MJ Martínez Sánchez | 2 | 6 | [4]
3 | (Slovenia) A Klepač (Slovenia) K Srebotnik | 6 | 7^{7}
(Ukraine) L Kichenok (Ukraine) N Kichenok | 2 | 6^{1}
WC | (Germany) A Beck (Italy) R Vinci | 2 | 6 | [7]
WC | (Germany) S Lisicki (Czech Republic) L Šafářová | 6 | 2 | [10]
(Argentina) M Irigoyen (Poland) P Kania | 6 | 6
(Chinese Taipei) C-j Chuang (Croatia) D Jurak | 3 | 3
(Germany) A-L Grönefeld (Czech Republic) K Peschke | 6 | 6
4 | (United States) R Atawo (Poland) A Rosolska | 2 | 4
(Australia) Ar Rodionova (Liechtenstein) S Vogt | 7 | 2 | [7]
WC | (Germany) A-L Friedsam (Germany) A Petkovic | 5 | 6 | [10]
(United Kingdom) J Konta (Germany) L Siegemund | 6 | 3 | [7]
2 | (France) C Garcia (France) K Mladenovic | 3 | 6 | [10]

Quarterfinals
1 | (Switzerland) M Hingis (India) S Mirza | 6 | 6
(Czech Republic) B Krejčíková (Czech Republic) K Siniaková | 1 | 3
3 | (Slovenia) A Klepač (Slovenia) K Srebotnik | 6 | 1 | [7]
WC | (Germany) S Lisicki (Czech Republic) L Šafářová | 2 | 6 | [10]
(Argentina) M Irigoyen (Poland) P Kania | 4 | 2
(Germany) A-L Grönefeld (Czech Republic) K Peschke | 6 | 6
WC | (Germany) A-L Friedsam (Germany) A Petkovic
2 | (France) C Garcia (France) K Mladenovic | w/o

Semifinals
1 | (Switzerland) M Hingis (India) S Mirza | 6 | 7
WC | (Germany) S Lisicki (Czech Republic) L Šafářová | 4 | 5
(Germany) A-L Grönefeld (Czech Republic) K Peschke | 5 | 7 | [4]
2 | (France) C Garcia (France) K Mladenovic | 7 | 5 | [10]

Final
1 | (Switzerland) M Hingis (India) S Mirza | 6 | 1 | [6]
2 | (France) C Garcia (France) K Mladenovic | 2 | 6 | [10]
