= 2016 J&T Banka Prague Open – Singles =

Singles
- 2016 J&T Banka Prague Open

Final
- Champion: (Czech Republic) Lucie Šafářová
- Runner-up: (Australia) Samantha Stosur
- Score: 3–6, 6–1, 6–4

Details
- Draw: 32
- Seeds: 8

Events
Singles	Doubles
- J&T Banka Prague Open

Karolína Plíšková was the defending champion, but lost in the semifinals to Lucie Šafářová.

Second-seeded Šafářová went on to win the title, defeating Samantha Stosur in the final, 3–6, 6–1, 6–4.

== Seeds ==
1. (Russia) Svetlana Kuznetsova (semifinals, withdrew)
2. (Czech Republic) Lucie Šafářová (champion)
3. (Czech Republic) Karolína Plíšková (semifinals)
4. (Australia) Samantha Stosur (final)
5. (Czech Republic) Barbora Strýcová (quarterfinals)
6. (Latvia) Jeļena Ostapenko (first round)
7. (Slovakia) Dominika Cibulková (first round)
8. (Belgium) Yanina Wickmayer (first round)

== Draw ==
Key

- Q = Qualifier
- WC = Wild card
- LL = Lucky loser
- Alt = Alternate
- ITF = ITF entry
- PR = Protected ranking
- SR = Special ranking
- SE = Special exempt
- JE = Junior exempt
- JR = Junior Accelerator Programme entrant
- CO = College Accelerator Programme entrant
- NG = Next Gen Accelerator Program entrant
- w/o = Walkover
- r = Retired
- d = Defaulted

=== Finals ===
Semifinals
1	(Russia) Svetlana Kuznetsova
4	(Australia) Samantha Stosur	w/o
3	(Czech Republic) Karolína Plíšková	4	6^{4}
2	(Czech Republic) Lucie Šafářová	6	7^{7}

Final
4	(Australia) Samantha Stosur	6	1	4
2	(Czech Republic) Lucie Šafářová	3	6	6

=== Top half ===
First round
1	(Russia) S Kuznetsova	6	5	6
(Belarus) A Sasnovich	0	7	1
(United States) M Brengle	6	6
(United Kingdom) N Broady	2	0
LL	(Czech Republic) T Smitková	2	1
(Puerto Rico) M Puig	6	6
LL	(Czech Republic) B Krejčíková	6	6
7	(Slovakia) D Cibulková	2	2
4	(Australia) S Stosur	3	6	6
Q	(Romania) S Cîrstea	6	4	2
Q	(France) O Dodin	3	2
WC	(Czech Republic) M Vondroušová	6	6
(Russia) M Gasparyan	6^{7}	5
WC	(Slovakia) J Čepelová	7^{9}	7
(Belarus) O Govortsova	3	5
5	(Czech Republic) B Strýcová	6	7

Second round
1	(Russia) S Kuznetsova	5	6	6
(United States) M Brengle	7	4	3
(Puerto Rico) M Puig	6	6
LL	(Czech Republic) B Krejčíková	4	4
4	(Australia) S Stosur	6	6
WC	(Czech Republic) M Vondroušová	3	4
WC	(Slovakia) J Čepelová	6^{3}	1
5	(Czech Republic) B Strýcová	7^{7}	6

Quarterfinals
1	(Russia) S Kuznetsova	4	7	6
(Puerto Rico) M Puig	6	5	4
4	(Australia) S Stosur	6	6^{3}	7^{7}
5	(Czech Republic) B Strýcová	3	7^{7}	6^{4}

Semifinals
1	(Russia) S Kuznetsova
4	(Australia) S Stosur	w/o

=== Bottom half ===
First round
8	(Belgium) Y Wickmayer	6	1	2
(Italy) C Giorgi	4	6	6
Q	(France) V Razzano	6	4	6
Q	(United States) V King	1	6	3
WC	(Czech Republic) K Siniaková	7^{7}	6
(France) A Cornet	6^{5}	3
SE	(Switzerland) S Vögele	1	3
3	(Czech Republic) Ka Plíšková	6	6
6	(Latvia) J Ostapenko	7	2	1
(Croatia) A Konjuh	5	6	6
(Czech Republic) Kr Plíšková	6	3	1
(Chinese Taipei) S-w Hsieh	4	6	6
(Czech Republic) L Hradecká	6	6
LL	(Czech Republic) A Hlaváčková	4	1
(Colombia) M Duque Mariño	6	3	3
2	(Czech Republic) L Šafářová	3	6	6

Second round
(Italy) C Giorgi	6	7
Q	(France) V Razzano	1	5
WC	(Czech Republic) K Siniaková	2	4
3	(Czech Republic) Ka Plíšková	6	6
(Croatia) A Konjuh	4	6	1
(Chinese Taipei) S-w Hsieh	6	2	6
(Czech Republic) L Hradecká	4	0^{r}
2	(Czech Republic) L Šafářová	6	2

Quarterfinals
(Italy) C Giorgi	2	1
3	(Czech Republic) Ka Plíšková	6	6
(Chinese Taipei) S-w Hsieh	6^{3}	5
2	(Czech Republic) L Šafářová	7^{7}	7

Semifinals
3	(Czech Republic) Ka Plíšková	4	6^{4}
2	(Czech Republic) L Šafářová	6	7^{7}

== Qualifying ==
=== Seeds ===
1. (Czech Republic) Klára Koukalová (first round)
2. (United States) Louisa Chirico (second round)
3. (Switzerland) Viktorija Golubic (first round)
4. (Romania) Patricia Maria Țig (first round)
5. (Romania) Sorana Cîrstea (qualified)
6. (Belgium) Ysaline Bonaventure (first round)
7. (Serbia) Ivana Jorović (first round)
8. (Poland) Paula Kania (first round)

=== Qualifiers ===
1. (Romania) Sorana Cîrstea
2. (United States) Vania King
3. (France) Océane Dodin
4. (France) Virginie Razzano

=== Lucky losers ===
1. (Czech Republic) Tereza Smitková
2. (Czech Republic) Andrea Hlaváčková
3. (Czech Republic) Barbora Krejčíková

=== Draw ===
==== First qualifier ====
First round
1	(Czech Republic) Klára Koukalová	4	6	6^{3}
(France) Amandine Hesse	6	0	7^{7}
(Russia) Ekaterina Alexandrova	1	6	6^{5}
(Bulgaria) Sesil Karatantcheva	6	2	7^{7}
(Liechtenstein) Stephanie Vogt	5	6^{2}
(Russia) Anastasiya Komardina	7	7^{7}
WC	(Czech Republic) Karolína Beránková	1	0
5	(Romania) Sorana Cîrstea	6	6

Second round
(France) Amandine Hesse	6	3	6
(Bulgaria) Sesil Karatantcheva	3	6	4
(Russia) Anastasiya Komardina	4	4
5	(Romania) Sorana Cîrstea	6	6

Qualifying competition
(France) Amandine Hesse	6^{2}	6	2
5	(Romania) Sorana Cîrstea	7^{7}	4	6

==== Second qualifier ====
First round
2	(United States) Louisa Chirico	6	6
(Ukraine) Nadiia Kichenok	0	3
(Czech Republic) Tereza Smitková	7	6
(Japan) Misa Eguchi	5	2
(Russia) Natela Dzalamidze	7	6
(Czech Republic) Tereza Martincová	5	1
(United States) Vania King	6	6
8	(Poland) Paula Kania	1	0

Second round
2	(United States) Louisa Chirico	3	3
(Czech Republic) Tereza Smitková	6	6
(Russia) Natela Dzalamidze	5	3
(United States) Vania King	7	6

Qualifying competition
(Czech Republic) Tereza Smitková	1	3
(United States) Vania King	6	6

==== Third qualifier ====
First round
3	(Switzerland) Viktorija Golubic	5	4
WC	(Slovakia) Viktória Kužmová	7	6
(Czech Republic) Barbora Štefková	2	2
(Czech Republic) Andrea Hlaváčková	6	6
(Russia) Viktoria Kamenskaya	4	3
(Luxembourg) Mandy Minella	6	6
(France) Océane Dodin	7	7
7	(Serbia) Ivana Jorović	5	5

Second round
WC	(Slovakia) Viktória Kužmová	7^{7}	4	2
(Czech Republic) Andrea Hlaváčková	6^{5}	6	6
(Luxembourg) Mandy Minella	2	4
(France) Océane Dodin	6	6

Qualifying competition
(Czech Republic) Andrea Hlaváčková	2	2
(France) Océane Dodin	6	6

==== Fourth qualifier ====
First round
4	(Romania) Patricia Maria Țig	2	4
(France) Virginie Razzano	6	6
WC	(Czech Republic) Kateřina Vaňková	6	5	0^{r}
(Georgia (country)) Sofia Shapatava	4	7	3
WC	(Czech Republic) Anna Slováková	4	4
(Argentina) María Irigoyen	6	6
(Czech Republic) Barbora Krejčíková	1	6	6
6	(Belgium) Ysaline Bonaventure	6	1	2

Second round
(France) Virginie Razzano	7^{9}	6
(Georgia (country)) Sofia Shapatava	6^{7}	3
(Argentina) María Irigoyen	1	0
(Czech Republic) Barbora Krejčíková	6	6

Qualifying competition
(France) Virginie Razzano	6	6
(Czech Republic) Barbora Krejčíková	3	2
