= 2016 Aegon Classic Birmingham – Singles =

Singles
- 2016 Aegon Classic Birmingham

Final
- Champion: (United States) Madison Keys
- Runner-up: (Czech Republic) Barbora Strýcová
- Score: 6–3, 6–4

Details
- Draw: 32 (4 Q / 4 WC )
- Seeds: 8

Events
Singles	Doubles
← 2015 ·	Birmingham Classic	· 2017 →

Angelique Kerber was the defending champion, but she lost to Carla Suárez Navarro in the quarterfinals.

Madison Keys won the title, defeating Barbora Strýcová in the final, 6–3, 6–4.

== Seeds ==
1. (Poland) Agnieszka Radwańska (first round)
2. (Germany) Angelique Kerber (quarterfinals)
3. (Romania) Simona Halep (withdrew because of a left achilles injury)
4. (Switzerland) Belinda Bencic (first round, retired)
5. (Czech Republic) Petra Kvitová (second round)
6. (Spain) Carla Suárez Navarro (semifinals)
7. (United States) Madison Keys (champion)
8. (Czech Republic) Karolína Plíšková (first round)
9. (United Kingdom) Johanna Konta (second round)

== Draw ==
=== Key ===
- Q = Qualifier
- WC = Wild card
- LL = Lucky loser
- Alt = Alternate
- ITF = ITF entry
- PR = Protected ranking
- SR = Special ranking
- SE = Special exempt
- JE = Junior exempt
- JR = Junior Accelerator Programme entrant
- CO = College Accelerator Programme entrant
- NG = Next Gen Accelerator Program entrant
- w/o = Walkover
- r = Retired
- d = Defaulted

=== Finals ===
Semifinals
(United States) CoCo Vandeweghe	6	4	3
(Czech Republic) Barbora Strýcová	2	6	6
7	(United States) Madison Keys	3	6	7^{7}
6	(Spain) Carla Suárez Navarro	6	3	6^{3}

Final
(Czech Republic) Barbora Strýcová	3	4
7	(United States) Madison Keys	6	6

=== Top half ===
First round
1/WC	(Poland) A Radwańska	5	6	3
(United States) C Vandeweghe	7	4	6
Q	(United States) C McHale	5	6	6
Q	(Czech Republic) K Siniaková	7	4	3
(Denmark) C Wozniacki	4	7^{7}	2
(Belgium) Y Wickmayer	6	6^{5}	6
(Japan) M Doi	6^{3}	1
9	(United Kingdom) J Konta	7^{7}	6
4	(Switzerland) B Bencic	4	3^{r}
(Romania) I-C Begu	6	4
Q	(Bulgaria) T Pironkova	6	6
(Ukraine) L Tsurenko	4	2
(Italy) C Giorgi	4	5
(United Kingdom) H Watson	6	7
(Czech Republic) B Strýcová	6	7^{9}
8	(Czech Republic) Ka Plíšková	4	6^{7}

Second round
(United States) C Vandeweghe	6	7^{7}
Q	(United States) C McHale	3	6^{2}
(Belgium) Y Wickmayer	6	6
9	(United Kingdom) J Konta	3	3
(Romania) I-C Begu	3	3
Q	(Bulgaria) T Pironkova	6	6
(United Kingdom) H Watson	5	4
(Czech Republic) B Strýcová	7	6

Quarterfinals
(United States) C Vandeweghe	6	6
(Belgium) Y Wickmayer	4	2
Q	(Bulgaria) T Pironkova	2	5
(Czech Republic) B Strýcová	6	7

Semifinals
(United States) C Vandeweghe	6	4	3
(Czech Republic) B Strýcová	2	6	6

=== Bottom half ===
First round
7	(United States) M Keys	7^{7}	6
(Hungary) T Babos	6^{3}	4
Q	(Austria) T Paszek	4	6	6
WC	(United Kingdom) T Moore	6	4	4
(Russia) A Pavlyuchenkova	6^{2}	1
(Latvia) J Ostapenko	7^{7}	6
(Czech Republic) L Šafářová	3	2
5/WC	(Czech Republic) P Kvitová	6	6
6	(Spain) C Suárez Navarro	7	4	7
(Ukraine) E Svitolina	5	6	5
(Germany) A Petkovic	6	6
LL	(Poland) M Linette	4	2
(Australia) D Gavrilova	4	6	6
WC	(United Kingdom) N Broady	6	2	3
PR	(China) S Peng	6^{3}	3
2	(Germany) A Kerber	7^{7}	6

Second round
7	(United States) M Keys	6	6
Q	(Austria) T Paszek	1	3
(Latvia) J Ostapenko	6	4	6
5/WC	(Czech Republic) P Kvitová	4	6	3
6	(Spain) C Suárez Navarro	4	7^{7}	7^{7}
(Germany) A Petkovic	6	6^{5}	6^{5}
(Australia) D Gavrilova	7	2	2
2	(Germany) A Kerber	5	6	6

Quarterfinals
7	(United States) M Keys	6^{1}	6	6
(Latvia) J Ostapenko	7^{7}	4	2
6	(Spain) C Suárez Navarro	6	1	7
2	(Germany) A Kerber	4	6	5

Semifinals
7	(United States) M Keys	3	6	7^{7}
6	(Spain) C Suárez Navarro	6	3	6^{3}

== Qualifying ==
=== Seeds ===
1. (Croatia) Mirjana Lučić-Baroni (first round)
2. (Ukraine) Kateryna Bondarenko (qualifying competition)
3. (United States) Varvara Lepchenko (first round)
4. (United States) Christina McHale (qualified)
5. (Bulgaria) Tsvetana Pironkova (qualified)
6. (United States) Louisa Chirico (first round)
7. (Turkey) Çağla Büyükakçay (first round)
8. (Poland) Magda Linette (qualifying competition, lucky loser)

=== Qualifiers ===
1. (Austria) Tamira Paszek
2. (Bulgaria) Tsvetana Pironkova
3. (Czech Republic) Kateřina Siniaková
4. (United States) Christina McHale

=== Lucky losers ===
1. (Poland) Magda Linette

=== Draw ===
==== First qualifier ====
First round
1	(Croatia) Mirjana Lučić-Baroni	2	4
(Russia) Alla Kudryavtseva	6	6
(Austria) Tamira Paszek	6	6^{3}	6
PR	(United States) Victoria Duval	2	7^{7}	1
(United States) Anna Tatishvili	6	4	6
WC	(United Kingdom) Harriet Dart	4	6	1
(Ukraine) Olga Savchuk	4	7^{11}	7^{7}
6	(United States) Louisa Chirico	6	6^{9}	6^{5}

Second round
(Russia) Alla Kudryavtseva	4	2
(Austria) Tamira Paszek	6	6
(United States) Anna Tatishvili	6	7
(Ukraine) Olga Savchuk	4	5

Qualifying competition
(Austria) Tamira Paszek	6	6
(United States) Anna Tatishvili	3	2

==== Second qualifier ====
First round
2	(Ukraine) Kateryna Bondarenko	6	7^{7}
(France) Océane Dodin	3	6^{3}
(Czech Republic) Klára Koukalová	1	7^{14}	6
Alt	(China) Xu Yifan	6	6^{12}	2
WC	(United Kingdom) Gabriella Taylor	3	4
(Czech Republic) Kristýna Plíšková	6	6
WC	(United Kingdom) Katie Boulter	1	2
5	(Bulgaria) Tsvetana Pironkova	6	6

Second round
2	(Ukraine) Kateryna Bondarenko	6	4	6
(Czech Republic) Klára Koukalová	4	6	1
(Czech Republic) Kristýna Plíšková	3	6^{8}
5	(Bulgaria) Tsvetana Pironkova	6	7^{10}

Qualifying competition
2	(Ukraine) Kateryna Bondarenko	5	4
5	(Bulgaria) Tsvetana Pironkova	7	6

==== Third qualifier ====
First round
3	(United States) Varvara Lepchenko	4	1
PR	(United Kingdom) Laura Robson	6	6
(Czech Republic) Kateřina Siniaková	6	6
(Croatia) Donna Vekić	3	0
Alt	(Slovenia) Andreja Klepač	2	4
(Bulgaria) Isabella Shinikova	6	6
(Serbia) Aleksandra Krunić	7	6
7	(Turkey) Çağla Büyükakçay	5	3

Second round
PR	(United Kingdom) Laura Robson	1	3
(Czech Republic) Kateřina Siniaková	6	6
(Bulgaria) Isabella Shinikova	1	2
(Serbia) Aleksandra Krunić	6	6

Qualifying competition
(Czech Republic) Kateřina Siniaková	6	6
(Serbia) Aleksandra Krunić	3	3

==== Fourth qualifier ====
First round
4	(United States) Christina McHale	6	6
(United States) Lauren Davis	2	3
(Japan) Naomi Osaka	6	6
(Japan) Kurumi Nara	2	3
WC	(United Kingdom) Jodie Burrage	5	4
(United States) Vania King	7	6
(Slovakia) Kristína Kučová	2	3
8	(Poland) Magda Linette	6	6

Second round
4	(United States) Christina McHale	6	0
(Japan) Naomi Osaka	0	0^{r}
(United States) Vania King	4	4
8	(Poland) Magda Linette	6	6

Qualifying competition
4	(United States) Christina McHale	6	6
8	(Poland) Magda Linette	4	3
