= 2016 J&T Banka Prague Open – Doubles =

Doubles
- 2016 J&T Banka Prague Open

Final
- Champions: (Russia) Margarita Gasparyan (Czech Republic) Andrea Hlaváčková
- Runners-up: (Argentina) María Irigoyen (Poland) Paula Kania
- Score: 6–4, 6–2

Details
- Draw: 16
- Seeds: 4

Events
| Singles | Doubles |
- J&T Banka Prague Open

Belinda Bencic and Kateřina Siniaková were the defending champions, but Bencic chose not to participate this year. Siniaková played alongside Barbora Krejčíková, but lost in the first round to Margarita Gasparyan and Andrea Hlaváčková.
Gasparyan and Hlaváčková went on to win the title, defeating María Irigoyen and Paula Kania in the final, 6–4, 6–2.

== Seeds ==
1. (United States) Raquel Atawo / (United States) Abigail Spears (semifinals)
2. (Russia) Margarita Gasparyan / (Czech Republic) Andrea Hlaváčková (champions)
3. (Chinese Taipei) Chuang Chia-jung / (Croatia) Darija Jurak (quarterfinals)
4. (China) Liang Chen / (Poland) Alicja Rosolska (first round)

== Draw ==
Key

- Q = Qualifier
- WC = Wild card
- LL = Lucky loser
- Alt = Alternate
- ITF = ITF entry
- PR = Protected ranking
- SR = Special ranking
- SE = Special exempt
- JE = Junior exempt
- JR = Junior Accelerator Programme entrant
- CO = College Accelerator Programme entrant
- NG = Next Gen Accelerator Program entrant
- w/o = Walkover
- r = Retired
- d = Defaulted

First round
1 | (United States) R Atawo (United States) A Spears | 6 | 6
(Ukraine) L Kichenok (Ukraine) N Kichenok | 1 | 2
(Belgium) Y Bonaventure (Chinese Taipei) S-w Hsieh | 6 | 6
WC | (Slovakia) J Čepelová (Slovakia) V Kužmová | 3 | 4
3 | (Chinese Taipei) C-j Chuang (Croatia) D Jurak | 6 | 6^{6} | [10]
(Russia) V Dushevina (Belarus) L Marozava | 1 | 7^{8} | [6]
(Czech Republic) B Strýcová (Czech Republic) R Voráčová | 4 | 6^{5}
(Argentina) M Irigoyen (Poland) P Kania | 6 | 7^{7}
(Georgia (country)) O Kalashnikova (Liechtenstein) S Vogt | 0 | 0
(Canada) G Dabrowski (Spain) MJ Martínez Sánchez | 6 | 6
(France) A Cornet (United States) V King | 6^{5} | 6 | [10]
4 | (China) C Liang (Poland) A Rosolska | 7^{7} | 1 | [2]
(Chinese Taipei) C-w Chan (Poland) K Jans-Ignacik | 7^{7} | 6
WC | (Czech Republic) T Smitková (Czech Republic) B Štefková | 6^{5} | 3
(Czech Republic) B Krejčíková (Czech Republic) K Siniaková | 4 | 6 | [4]
2 | (Russia) M Gasparyan (Czech Republic) A Hlaváčková | 6 | 4 | [10]

Quarterfinals
1 | (United States) R Atawo (United States) A Spears | 6 | 6
(Belgium) Y Bonaventure (Chinese Taipei) S-w Hsieh | 1 | 4
3 | (Chinese Taipei) C-j Chuang (Croatia) D Jurak | 3 | 6 | [6]
(Argentina) M Irigoyen (Poland) P Kania | 6 | 3 | [10]
(Canada) G Dabrowski (Spain) MJ Martínez Sánchez | 1 | 6 | [11]
(France) A Cornet (United States) V King | 6 | 3 | [9]
(Chinese Taipei) C-w Chan (Poland) K Jans-Ignacik | 6 | 4 | [7]
2 | (Russia) M Gasparyan (Czech Republic) A Hlaváčková | 4 | 6 | [10]

Semifinals
1 | (United States) R Atawo (United States) A Spears | 4 | 2
(Argentina) M Irigoyen (Poland) P Kania | 6 | 6
(Canada) G Dabrowski (Spain) MJ Martínez Sánchez | 5 | 6 | [5]
2 | (Russia) M Gasparyan (Czech Republic) A Hlaváčková | 7 | 4 | [10]

Final
(Argentina) M Irigoyen (Poland) P Kania | 4 | 2
2 | (Russia) M Gasparyan (Czech Republic) A Hlaváčková | 6 | 6
