= 2016 Aegon Classic Birmingham – Doubles =

Doubles
- 2016 Aegon Classic Birmingham

Final
- Champions: (Czech Republic) Karolína Plíšková (Czech Republic) Barbora Strýcová
- Runners-up: (United States) Vania King (Russia) Alla Kudryavtseva
- Score: 6–3, 7–6^{(7–1)}

Details
- Draw: 16 (2WC)
- Seeds: 4

Events
Singles	Doubles
- Birmingham Classic

Garbiñe Muguruza and Carla Suárez Navarro were the defending champions, but they chose not to participate this year.

Karolína Plíšková and Barbora Strýcová won the title, defeating Vania King and Alla Kudryavtseva in the final, 6–3, 7–6^{(7–1)}.

== Seeds ==
1. (Chinese Taipei) Chan Hao-ching / (Chinese Taipei) Chan Yung-jan (semifinals)
2. (India) Sania Mirza / (United States) Coco Vandeweghe (first round)
3. (Czech Republic) Andrea Hlaváčková / (Czech Republic) Lucie Šafářová (first round)
4. (Slovenia) Andreja Klepač / (Slovenia) Katarina Srebotnik (quarterfinals)

== Draw ==
Key

- Q = Qualifier
- WC = Wild card
- LL = Lucky loser
- Alt = Alternate
- ITF = ITF entry
- PR = Protected ranking
- SR = Special ranking
- SE = Special exempt
- JE = Junior exempt
- JR = Junior Accelerator Programme entrant
- CO = College Accelerator Programme entrant
- NG = Next Gen Accelerator Program entrant
- w/o = Walkover
- r = Retired
- d = Defaulted

=== Draw ===
First round
1	(Chinese Taipei) H-c Chan (Chinese Taipei) Y-j Chan	6	7^{7}
(Ukraine) K Bondarenko (Ukraine) O Savchuk	4	6^{5}
(Chinese Taipei) C-j Chuang (Russia) A Pavlyuchenkova	6	4	[10]
Alt	(Japan) M Doi (Japan) K Nara	3	6	[8]
4	(Slovenia) A Klepač (Slovenia) K Srebotnik	6	7^{7}
(China) S Peng (China) Y Xu	1	6^{2}
(United States) V King (Russia) A Kudryavtseva	7^{7}	7^{7}
(Serbia) A Krunić (Poland) A Rosolska	6^{3}	6^{4}
(Romania) I-C Begu (Romania) R Olaru	6	0	[8]
(Czech Republic) Ka Plíšková (Czech Republic) B Strýcová	2	6	[10]
(Croatia) D Jurak (Australia) An Rodionova	6	1	[10]
3	(Czech Republic) A Hlaváčková (Czech Republic) L Šafářová	3	6	[6]
WC	(United Kingdom) J Konta (Ukraine) E Svitolina	2	6	[10]
(Hungary) T Babos (Georgia (country)) O Kalashnikova	6	3	[1]
WC	(United Kingdom) N Broady (United Kingdom) H Watson	6	6
2	(India) S Mirza (United States) C Vandeweghe	4	4

Quarterfinals
1	(Chinese Taipei) H-c Chan (Chinese Taipei) Y-j Chan	3	6	[10]
(Chinese Taipei) C-j Chuang (Russia) A Pavlyuchenkova	6	4	[6]
4	(Slovenia) A Klepač (Slovenia) K Srebotnik	3	3
(United States) V King (Russia) A Kudryavtseva	6	6
(Czech Republic) Ka Plíšková (Czech Republic) B Strýcová	6	6
(Croatia) D Jurak (Australia) An Rodionova	2	1
WC	(United Kingdom) J Konta (Ukraine) E Svitolina	2	6^{5}
WC	(United Kingdom) N Broady (United Kingdom) H Watson	6	7^{7}

Semifinals
1	(Chinese Taipei) H-c Chan (Chinese Taipei) Y-j Chan	2	1
(United States) V King (Russia) A Kudryavtseva	6	6
(Czech Republic) Ka Plíšková (Czech Republic) B Strýcová	6	6
WC	(United Kingdom) N Broady (United Kingdom) H Watson	2	4

Final
(United States) V King (Russia) A Kudryavtseva	3	6^{1}
(Czech Republic) Ka Plíšková (Czech Republic) B Strýcová	6	7^{7}
