= 2016 Aegon International Eastbourne – Doubles =

Doubles
- 2016 Aegon International Eastbourne

Final
- Champions: (Croatia) Darija Jurak (Australia) Anastasia Rodionova
- Runners-up: (Chinese Taipei) Chan Hao-ching (Chinese Taipei) Chan Yung-jan
- Score: 5–7, 7–6^{(7–4)}, [10–6]

Details
- Draw: 16
- Seeds: 4

Events
Singles	Doubles
- Eastbourne International

Caroline Garcia and Katarina Srebotnik were the defending champions, but Garcia chose not to participate this year. Srebotnik played alongside Andreja Klepač, but lost in the first round to Anna-Lena Grönefeld and Květa Peschke.

Darija Jurak and Anastasia Rodionova won the title, defeating Chan Hao-ching and Chan Yung-jan in the final, 5–7, 7–6(7–4), [10–6].

== Seeds ==
1. (Switzerland) Martina Hingis / (India) Sania Mirza (quarterfinals)
2. (Chinese Taipei) Chan Hao-ching / (Chinese Taipei) Chan Yung-jan (final)
3. (Russia) Ekaterina Makarova / (Russia) Elena Vesnina (quarterfinals)
4. (Hungary) Tímea Babos / (Kazakhstan) Yaroslava Shvedova (semifinals)

== Draw ==
Key

- Q = Qualifier
- WC = Wild card
- LL = Lucky loser
- Alt = Alternate
- ITF = ITF entry
- PR = Protected ranking
- SR = Special ranking
- SE = Special exempt
- JE = Junior exempt
- JR = Junior Accelerator Programme entrant
- CO = College Accelerator Programme entrant
- NG = Next Gen Accelerator Program entrant
- w/o = Walkover
- r = Retired
- d = Defaulted

First round
1	(Switzerland) M Hingis (India) S Mirza	6	2	[10]
WC	(Czech Republic) L Šafářová (Australia) S Stosur	1	6	[4]
(Croatia) D Jurak (Australia) An Rodionova	6	1	[10]
(Canada) G Dabrowski (Russia) D Kasatkina	4	6	[6]
3	(Russia) E Makarova (Russia) E Vesnina	6	6
WC	(Russia) S Kuznetsova (Italy) R Vinci	3	4
(Germany) A-L Grönefeld (Czech Republic) K Peschke	3	6	[10]
(Slovenia) A Klepač (Slovenia) K Srebotnik	6	3	[6]
(Chinese Taipei) C-j Chuang (China) C Liang	6	3	[6]
(China) Y Xu (China) S Zheng	2	6	[10]
(Spain) A Medina Garrigues (Spain) A Parra Santonja	1	2
4	(Hungary) T Babos (Kazakhstan) Y Shvedova	6	6
WC	(United Kingdom) N Broady (United Kingdom) H Watson	5	0^{r}
(United States) R Atawo (United States) A Spears	7	0
(Italy) S Errani (Georgia (country)) O Kalashnikova	2	2
2	(Chinese Taipei) H-c Chan (Chinese Taipei) Y-j Chan	6	6

Quarterfinals
1	(Switzerland) M Hingis (India) S Mirza	3	3
(Croatia) D Jurak (Australia) An Rodionova	6	6
3	(Russia) E Makarova (Russia) E Vesnina
(Germany) A-L Grönefeld (Czech Republic) K Peschke	w/o
(China) Y Xu (China) S Zheng	6^{6}	3
4	(Hungary) T Babos (Kazakhstan) Y Shvedova	7^{8}	6
(United States) R Atawo (United States) A Spears	6	2	[8]
2	(Chinese Taipei) H-c Chan (Chinese Taipei) Y-j Chan	4	6	[10]

Semifinals
(Croatia) D Jurak (Australia) An Rodionova	6	6
(Germany) A-L Grönefeld (Czech Republic) K Peschke	2	1
4	(Hungary) T Babos (Kazakhstan) Y Shvedova	1	6	[6]
2	(Chinese Taipei) H-c Chan (Chinese Taipei) Y-j Chan	6	1	[10]

Final
(Croatia) D Jurak (Australia) An Rodionova	5	7^{7}	[10]
2	(Chinese Taipei) H-c Chan (Chinese Taipei) Y-j Chan	7	6^{4}	[6]
