= Badge of Honor for Merit in the Protection of Children's Rights =

Departmental decoration of Poland

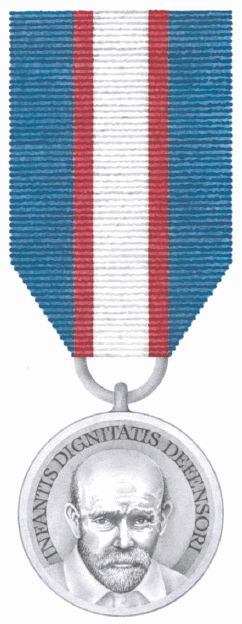
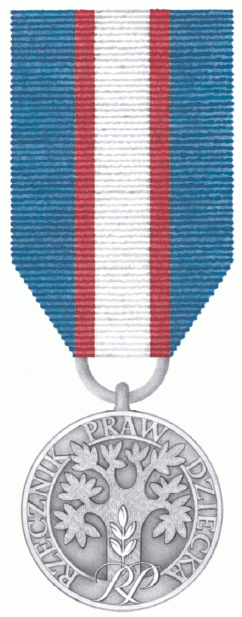
- Badge of Honor for Merit in the Protection of Children's Rights
- Type: Medal
- Awarded for: Special achievements in the protection of children's rights
- Presented by: Poland
- Status: Active
- Established: February 15, 2013
- Total: 443 (as of 2025)
- Ribbon bar of the award

The Badge of Honor for Merit in the Protection of Children's Rights (Polish: Odznaka Honorowa za Zasługi dla Ochrony Praw Dziecka) is a departmental decoration of Poland, established on February 15, 2013, by the President of Poland for special achievements in the protection of children's rights.

== Criteria ==
The badge may be awarded to citizens of the Republic of Poland, citizens of foreign nations, and to organizations or institutions based in the Republic of Poland or abroad for special achievements in the field of protection of children's rights.

The badge is presented by the Children's Ombudsman or an authorized agent, and may be awarded at their own discretion, or at the request of a minister or head of a central office, a local government administration body or a body of a local government unit, the rector of a university or other university conducting teaching and research activities in the field of protection of children's rights, a non-governmental organization whose statutory activity is the protection of children's rights, or the head of a diplomatic representation or consular office of the Republic of Poland.

The award is single-level, and may only be awarded to the same person or institution once.

== Insignia ==
The medal is made of silver-plated and oxidized metal, 32mm in diameter, The obverse depicts a portrait of Janusz Korczak, surrounded by a convex inscription in Latin reading INFANTIS DIGNITATIS DEFENSORI (English: Defenders of the Dignity of Children). The reverse depicts a young shoot superimposed over a fully-grown tree, surrounded by an inscription in Polish reading RZECZNIK PRAW DZIECKA (English: Children's Ombudsman), interrupted at the bottom by the letters RP, the monogram for the Republic of Poland.

The medal is suspended from a ribbon of repp silk, 36mm in width. The ribbon is composed of two 10mm vertical lapis lazuli stripes, and a 10mm white stripe running down the center, separated by two 3mm crimson stripes.

The medal is worn on the left side of the chest, after state orders and decorations.

== Recipients ==
Recipients of the award are published in a publicly available list on the Children's Ombudsman's official government website.

1. Maria Łopatkowa (2013)
2. Bibiana Mossakowska (2013)
3. Jadwiga Bińczycka (2014)
4. Alicja Chybicka (2013)
5. Committee for the Protection of Children's Rights (2013)
6. Gift of Heart Foundation (2013)
7. Jan Amos Komensky Children's Development Foundation (2013)
8. Jerzy Hamerski (2013)
9. Ewa Dados (2013)
10. Marta Bogdanowicz (2014)
11. Primary School No. 12 with Integration Classes (2014)
12. Bruno Vanobbergen (2014)
13. Grzegorz Jach (2014)
14. Association for Children and Youth “SZANSA” in Głogów (2014)
15. Nobody's Children Foundation (2014)
16. Friends of Integration Association (2014)
17. George Moschos (2014)
18. Krystyna Starczewska (2015)
19. Łukasz Ługowski (2015)
20. Primary School No. 1 of the Knights of the Order of the Smile in Nysa (2015)
21. Remigiusz Henczel (2015)
22. Main Board of the Society of Friends of Children (2015)
23. Agnieszka Szymkiewicz-Abramik (2015)
24. Piotr Pamuła (2015)
25. "Children's Smile" Foundation (2015)
26. Association of Patients with Mucopolysaccharidosis (MPS) and Rare Diseases (2015)
27. Stanisław Leszek Stadniczeńko (2015)
28. Teresa Słupianek (2015)
29. Joanna Grębowska-Szpak (2015)
30. Association of Parents and Friends of Blind and Visually Impaired Children “Rainbow” in Warsaw (2015)
31. Alicja Binert (2015)
32. Henryka Krzywonos (2015)
33. Kazimierz Pleśniak (2016)
34. Rafał Batkowski (2016)
35. Alicja Matysik (2016)
36. Małgorzata Gryń-Chlebicka (2016)
37. Sławomir Moczydłowski (2016)
38. Romuald Sadowski (2016)
39. Grażyna Falkowska (2016)
40. World “YES” Foundation (2016)
41. Batia Gilad (2016)
42. Teresa Jackowska (2016)
43. Marek Konopczyński (2016)
44. Katarzyna Ludwiniak (2016)
45. Leszek Michalak (2016)
46. International Chapter of the Order of the Smile (2016)
47. Ewa Milewska-Celińska (2016)
48. Teresa Nowacka (2016)
49. Dorota Olczak-Kowalczyk (2016)
50. Krzysztof Rączka (2016)
51. Barbara Smolińska-Theiss (2016)
52. Adam Solak (2016)
53. Wanda Stojanowska (2016)
54. Primary School of the Knights of the Order of the Smile in Rudno (2016)
55. Maciej Tanaś (2016)
56. Danuta Rosner (2016)
57. Justyna Kopińska (2016)
58. Agata Młynarska (2016)
59. Ludmiła Bacewicz (2016)
60. Iwona Guzowska (2016)
61. Marta Santos Pais (2016)
62. Wanda Chotomska (2016)
63. Joanna Papuzińska (2016)
64. Piotr Sadkiewicz (2016)
65. Henryk Skarżyński (2016)
66. Beautiful Angels Association (2016)
67. Peter Newell (2016)
68. Subcarpathian Foster Parenting Association “Big Heart” (2016)
69. "You Are Not Alone" Foundation (2016)
70. Wrocław Puppet Theatre (2016)
71. Barbara Mierzejewska (2016)
72. Jarosław Wojtasiński (2016)
73. Edyta Wojtasińska (2016)
74. Primary School of the Knights of the Order of the Smile in Osiek (2016)
75. Joanna Luberadzka-Gruca (2016)
76. Foster Parenting Association, Złotów Branch (2016)
77. Jonathan Levy (2016)
78. Henryk Haak (2016)
79. Caritas Poland (2016)
80. Local Committee for the Protection of Children's Rights in Gdańsk (2016)
81. Local Committee for the Protection of Children's Rights in Inowrocław (2016)
82. Local Committee for the Protection of Children's Rights in Jelenia Góra (2016)
83. Local Committee for the Protection of Children's Rights in Katowice (2016)
84. Local Committee for the Protection of Children's Rights in Kłobuck (2016)
85. Local Committee for the Protection of Children's Rights in Kraków (2016)
86. Local Committee for the Protection of Children's Rights in Kruszwica (2016)
87. Local Committee for the Protection of Children's Rights in Leszno (2016)
88. Local Committee for the Protection of Children's Rights in Lubliniec (2016)
89. Local Committee for the Protection of Children's Rights in Łódź (2016)
90. Local Committee for the Protection of Children's Rights in Malbork (2016)
91. Local Committee for the Protection of Children's Rights in Ostrołęka (2016)
92. Local Committee for the Protection of Children's Rights in Piekary Śląskie (2016)
93. Local Committee for the Protection of Children's Rights in Poznań (2016)
94. Local Committee for the Protection of Children's Rights in Rzeszów (2016)
95. Local Committee for the Protection of Children's Rights in Solec Kujawski (2016)
96. Local Committee for the Protection of Children's Rights in Sosnowiec (2016)
97. Local Committee for the Protection of Children's Rights in Toruń (2016)
98. Local Committee for the Protection of Children's Rights in Wałbrzych (2016)
99. Local Committee for the Protection of Children's Rights in Zielona Góra (2016)
100. Maciej Wojtyszko (2016)
101. Grażyna Karwowska-Winiarek (2016)
102. Anna Kozłowska (2016)
103. Local Committee for the Protection of Children's Rights in Częstochowa (2016)
104. MATIO Foundation for Families and People with Cystic Fibrosis (2016)
105. Association for the Disabled of Żywiec Land (2016)
106. Marian Zembala (2016)
107. Szymon Hołownia (2016)
108. Helena Wąchała (2016)
109. Foundation for the Children of the Copper Basin (2016)
110. Paweł Rieske (2016)
111. Association of Adoptive and Foster Families “Pro Familia” (2016)
112. Adam Płonka (2016)
113. Tuomas Kurttila (2016)
114. Anna Zoń (2017)
115. Alicja Szatkowska (2017)
116. Anna Chinalska (2017)
117. Agnieszka Gmitrowicz (2017)
118. Special Educational Center "Okroszek" in Kołobrzeg (2017)
119. Jarosław Godun (2017)
120. Rafał Chomicz (2017)
121. Lidia Lempart (2017)
122. Wiacheslau Izotau (2017)
123. Jauhen Ukraincau (2017)
124. Primary School No. 3 of the Knights of the Order of the Smile in Mysłowice (2017)
125. Primary School of the Knights of the Order of the Smile in Grala Dąbrowiżnie (2017)
126. Anna Kozak (2017)
127. Polish Committee of the World Organization for Early Childhood Education OMEP (2017)
128. Marian Subocz (2017)
129. Małgorzata Gorący (2017)
130. Edyta Gruszczyk-Kolczyńska (2017)
131. Marina Hulia (2017)
132. Dorota Trautman (2017)
133. Anna Komorowska (2017)
134. Edita Žiobienė (2017)
135. Jerzy Pertkiewicz (2017)
136. Dorota Bogdańska (2017)
137. Włodzimierz Paszyński (2017)
138. Marta Ciesielska (2017)
139. Elżbieta Popławska-Dobiejewska (2017)
140. Mirosława Ewa Kątna (2017)
141. Katarzyna Stoparczyk (2017)
142. Mieczysław Augustyn (2017)
143. Jerzy Wrębiak (2017)
144. Primary School of the Knights of the Order of the Smile in Stołeczna (2017)
145. Alina Janowska (2017)
146. Marek Krupiński (2017)
147. Malala Yousafzai (2017)
148. Ryszard Konstanty (2017)
149. Dorota Helena Pawłowska (2017)
150. Zdzisława Dix (2017)
151. Jadwiga Kępa (2017)
152. Eugeniusz Kępa (2017)
153. Lidia Niedźwiedzka-Owsiak (2018)
154. Jerzy Owsiak (2018)
155. Institute "Monument - Children's Health Center" (2018)
156. Maria Magdziarz (2018)
157. Joanna Elżbieta Marcinkowska (2018)
158. Izabella Udzik (2018)
159. Alicja Maria Wojciechowska (2018)
160. Magdalena Katarzyna Wontek (2018)
161. Jacek Adam Sadrakuła (2018)
162. Vocational Training Center "Nauka" in Tczew (2018)
163. Anna Florek Foundation "Childhood Time" in Warsaw (2018)
164. Clever Foundation Primary School in Wałbrzych (2018)
165. EKOLA Educational Foundation School Complex (2018)
166. Szczecin International School Complex (2018)
167. Kinga Wnuk (2018)
168. Wioletta Krzyżanowska (2018)
169. Ewa Chotomska (2018)
170. Dominika Kulczyk (2018)
171. Krzysztof Marzec (2018)
172. Andrzej Marek Grabowski (2018)
173. Piotr Kowalczuk (2018)
174. Iwona Aneta Paszkiewicz (2018)
175. Primary School of the Knights of the Order of the Smile in Osiecznica (2018)
176. Primary School No. 8 of the Knights of the Order of the Smile in Świdnica (2018)
177. Primary School No. 1 with Integration Classes of the Knights of the Order of the Smile in Przasnysz (2018)
178. Public Primary School of the Knights of the Order of the Smile in Skorogoszcz (2018)
179. Primary School of the Knights of the Order of the Smile in Łukom (2018)
180. Special Educational Center of the Knights of the Order of the Smile in Huta (2018)
181. Primary School with Integration Classes of the Knights of the Order of the Smile in Mrzeżyno (2018)
182. Special Educational Center of the Knights of the Order of the Smile in Tanów (2018)
183. Tomasz Sadowski (2018)
184. Bożena Węglarz (2018)
185. Tadeusz Kosiński (2018)
186. Antoni Długosz (2018)
187. Ryszard Kiełek (2018)
188. Halina Marszał-Sroczyńska (2018)
189. Rafael Rokaszewicz (2018)
190. Jerry Nussbaum (2018)
191. Public Primary School of the Knights of the Order of the Smile in Śrem (2018)
192. Irwin Elman (2018)
193. Jerzy Latała (2018)
194. Jerzy Smoleń (2018)
195. Anetta Jaworska-Rutkowska (2018)
196. Marcim Schmidt (2018)
197. Adil Abdel Aati (2018)
198. Maria Barbara Kolago-Belerska (2018)
199. Marian Kulig (2018)
200. Dorota Zawadzka (2018)
201. Beata Sobocińska (2018)
202. Katarzyna Traczyk (2018)
203. Anna Maria Wesołowska (2018)
204. Gerard Żórawik (2018)
205. Irene Fahle (2018)
206. Ewa Chrobak-Szota (2018)
207. Józef Mateja (2018)
208. Greta Lemanaite-Deprati (2018)
209. Renata Piątkowska (2018)
210. Bartosz Wajman (2018)
211. Katarzyna Januszewska (2018)
212. Anita Poliwczak (2018)
213. Sister Andżelika Tabula (2018)
214. Polish Scouting and Guiding Association (2018)
215. Elżbieta Palej (2018)
216. Anna Sobiesiak (2018)
217. Tadeusz Biernat (2018)
218. Helena Ciepła (2018)
219. Bronisław Czech (2018)
220. Paweł Jaros (2018)
221. Stanisława Kalus (2018)
222. Agnieszka Rękas (2018)
223. Jadwiga Skibińska-Adamowicz (2018)
224. Teresa Mróz (2018)
225. Renata Durda (2018)
226. Maciej Aleksander Karolczak (2018)
227. Tomasz Męcik-Kronenberg (2018)
228. Anna Dymna (2018)
229. Elżbieta Golińska (2018)
230. Rafał Janiszewski (2018)
231. Laura Koba (2018)
232. Anna Lechowska (2018)
233. Edward Lutczyn (2018)
234. Teresa Ogrodzińska (2018)
235. Piotr Pawłowski (2018)
236. Aleksandra Piotrowska (2018)
237. Society of Friends of Children, Koszalin Branch (2018)
238. Ewa Jarosz (2018)
239. Adam Żak (2018)
240. Bogusław Śliwerski (2018)
241. Jan Oleszczuk (2018)
242. Henryka Sokołowska (2018)
243. Society of Friends of Children, Legnica Branch (2018)
244. Monika Sajkowska (2018)
245. Grzegorz Kramer (2018)
246. Sławomir Piechota (2018)
247. Małgorzata Chmielewska (2018)
248. Anna Czerwińska-Rydel (2018)
249. Ewa Górecka (2018)
250. Wiesława Jędrzejczykowa (2018)
251. Anna Nowosad (2018)
252. Małgorzata Syczewska (2018)
253. Agata Szczepańska (2018)
254. Cogito Group Ltd. (2018)
255. Agnieszka Sikora (2018)
256. Elżbieta Rusiniak (2018)
257. Helena Pyz (2018)
258. Henryka Szczepanowska (2018)
259. Grzegorz Kasdepke (2018)
260. Polsat Foundation (2018)
261. Martyna Wojciechowska (2018)
262. Ewa Drozd (2018)
263. Anna Tuszyńska (2018)
264. Krzysztof Strycharski (2018)
265. Editorial Team, Głos Nauczycielski (2018)
266. Michał Olszański (2018)
267. Enrico Bottero (2018)
268. Małgorzata Janas-Kozik (2018)
269. Janina Ochojska (2018)
270. Maria Jaworska-Kępka (2018)
271. Radosław Joachim Potrac (2018)
272. Beata Moskal-Słaniewska (2018)
273. Thomas Badian (2018)
274. Violetta Zdziechowska-Mazurek (2018)
275. Małgorzata Hugo-Bader (2018)
276. Arkadiusz Siejka (2018)
277. Children's Smile Foundation (2018)
278. Katarzyna Brożek (2018)
279. Adam Sikoń (2018)
280. Dorota Kołakowska (2018)
281. Dorota Nowak-Małek (2018)
282. Aldona Karlak (2018)
283. Agnieszka Nawrocka (2018)
284. Juris Jansons (2018)
285. Thomas Hammarberg (2018)
286. Agnieszka Pogorzelska (2018)
287. Danuta Świątek (2018)
288. Kirsten Sandberg (2018)
289. Emily Logan (2018)
290. Renate Winter (2018)
291. Jan Ćwiek (2018)
292. Helena Słowik (2018)
293. Danuta Sekuła (2018)
294. Roza Valeeva (2018)
295. Irina Demakowa (2018)
296. Theo Cappon (2018)
297. Jarosław Peregud-Pogorzelski (2018)
298. Ewa Błaszczyk (2018)
299. Jenson-Joergen Pedersen (2018)
300. Danuta Kuczyńska (2019)
301. Krzysztof Gorzycki (2019)
302. Nunziante Virginia Coda (2019)
303. Fortunato Di Noto (2019)
304. Tadeusz Smyczyński (2019)
305. Bogusława Sikacka (2019)
306. Szymon Bolik (2019)
307. Józefa Kielak (2019)
308. Maria Jabłońska (2019)
309. Maria Frączek (2019)
310. Association for the Development of Children, Youth, and Family “Helping Hand” (2019)
311. Tisa Żawrocka-Kwiatkowska (2019)
312. Agnieszka Radwańska (2019)
313. Łukasz Golec (2019)
314. Paweł Golec(2019)
315. Wanda Półtawska (2019)
316. Small Feet Foundation (2020)
317. Rev. Daniel Prelate Adamowicz (2020)
318. Danuta Opozda (2020)
319. Teresa Misiuk (2020)
320. Weronika Barbara Kołtun (2020)
321. Mateusz Ferens (2020)
322. Sławomir Tór (2020)
323. Agnieszka Plago-Semczuk (2020)
324. Anna Kowalska-Ćwik (2020)
325. Marek Kozłowski (2020)
326. Henryk Ostrykiewicz (2020)
327. Stanisława Raczkiewicz (2020)
328. Bożena Kosuda (2020)
329. Rev. Alfred Wloka (2021)
330. Helena Kmieć (2021)
331. Katarzyna and Mateusz Kłoskowie (2021)
332. Zofia and Kazimierz Miller (2021)
333. Janusz Kotański (2021)
334. Czesława Dresler (2021)
335. Teresa Lesiak (2021)
336. Piotr Paul (2021)
337. Association for the Development of Dębno Village (2021)
338. Jaromir Burek (2021)
339. Association for the Development of Kozietuły Village and Surroundings (2021)
340. “Sower” Foundation named after Blessed Edmund Bojanowski (2021)
341. Janina Kovacs (2022)
342. Krystyna Zabrzewska (2022)
343. Regional Group “Regle” (2022)
344. Regional Group “Zbójnicek” (2022)
345. Regional Group “Mali Bystrzanie” (2022)
346. Jan Ustupski (2022)
347. Elżbieta Murasiewicz (2022)
348. Janina and Władysław Filar (2022)
349. Małgorzata Tlałka-Długosz (2022)
350. Andrzej Antoni Sekuradzki (2022)
351. Association of Large Families 3+ (2022)
352. Szymon Grzelak (2022)
353. Bogna Białecka (2022)
354. Joanna Krupska (2022)
355. Janusz Wardak (2022)
356. Paweł Woliński (2022)
357. Ewa Kazimierczak (2022)
358. Edyta and Marcin Pawlus-Sapeta, Sapeta (2022)
359. Responsible Gdańsk Association (2022)
360. Residential Care Home for Children and Youth with Intellectual Disabilities of the Seraphic Sisters (2022)
361. Marta Goździk (2022)
362. Maria Jendryka (2022)
363. Jadwiga Brajer (2022)
364. Barbara Zegar (2022)
365. Janusz Dziubałtowski (2022)
366. Gabriela and Tadeusz Wolscy (2022)
367. Witalij “Klitschko” (2022)
368. Iryna Wereszczuk (2022)
369. Dmytro Łubinec (2022)
370. Zenon Białasik (2023)
371. Jarosław Banaszak (2023)
372. Małgorzata Jakubowska (2023)
373. Congregation of St. Philip Neri Oratory in Gostyń (2023)
374. Association for the Care of Abandoned Children, “Oratory” (2023)
375. Tomasz Latoszek (2023)
376. Aniela and Piotr Wojciechowscy (2023)
377. Anna Grochal (2023)
378. Helena and Krzysztof Rzewuscy (2023)
379. Katarzyna Graczyk (2023)
380. Gabriela Świeżawska (2023)
381. Aleksandra Ruszczak (2023)
382. Association of Preschool Education “Initiative and Creativity” (2023)
383. Sports Club “Bears” Toruń (2023)
384. Alina Basak (2023)
385. Danuta Ciechanowicz-Jasztal (2023)
386. Jacek Jasztal (2023)
387. Michał Woś (2023)
388. Anna and Kazimierz Lassakowie (2023)
389. Augustinian Sisters Congregation in Kraków (2023)
390. Barbara Nowak (2023)
391. Congregation of the Sisters of Our Lady of Mercy (2023)
392. Sławomir Kowalski (2023)
393. Małgorzata Łukaszewska (2023)
394. Joanna Kozłowska (2023)
395. Beata and Krzysztof Wielkopolanowie (2023)
396. Zofia Adamaszek (2023)
397. Agata Jasztal (2023)
398. Ewelina Rzeplińska-Rogalska (2023)
399. Justyna Sokołowska (2023)
400. Anna Malinowska (2023)
401. Kajetan Broniewski (2023)
402. Tomasz Grzelczyk (2023)
403. Szymon Klemeński (2023)
404. Arkadiusz Pawlak (2023)
405. Mariusz Nowacki (2023)
406. Justyna Wąsala-Gura (2023)
407. Anna Borowiec (2023)
408. Maksym Siarkevych (2023)
409. Karol Maćkowiak (2023)
410. Przemysław Wysocki (2023)
411. Mikołaj Wojtyczka (2023)
412. Grzegorz Marszałek (2023)
413. Andrzej Małecki (2023)
414. Elżbieta Panek-Pieroń (2023)
415. Małgorzata Laskoś (2023)
416. Marianna Wichłacz (2023)
417. Krzysztof Zuba (2023)
418. Andrzej Anasiak (2023)
419. Tomasz Wawrzkowicz (2023)
420. Szymon Czyszek (2023)
421. Rev. Ryszard Umański (2023)
422. Rev. Piotr Kutynia (2023)
423. Rev. Andrzej O. Kukła, CSsR (2023)
424. Adam Maślany (2023)
425. Rev. Zenon Myszk (2023)
426. Rev. Wiesław Lenartowicz (2023)
427. Marcin Wojciechowski (2023)
428. Rev. Andrzej Stopyra (2023)
429. Rev. Marek O. Raczkiewicz, CSsR (2023)
430. Rev. José Miguel O. de Haro, CSsR (2023)
431. Elżbieta Wiśniewska (2023)
432. Waldemar Basak (2023)
433. Center for Supporting Initiatives for Life and Family Foundation (2023)
434. Marzena Affeldt (2024)
435. Irena Motow (2024)
436. Tomasz Bilicki (2024)
437. Anna Dobrzańska (2025)
438. Maria Pielas (2025)
439. Ewa Warszewska (2025)
440. Ilona Dranka (2025)
441. Kraków School Sports Center of the Gray Ranks (2025)
442. Mariusz Biniewski (2025)
443. Ocalenie Foundation (2025)

== See also ==
- Orders, decorations, and medals of Poland
- Human rights in Poland
- Convention on the Rights of the Child
