= Henryk Skarżyński =

Polish surgeon (born 1954)

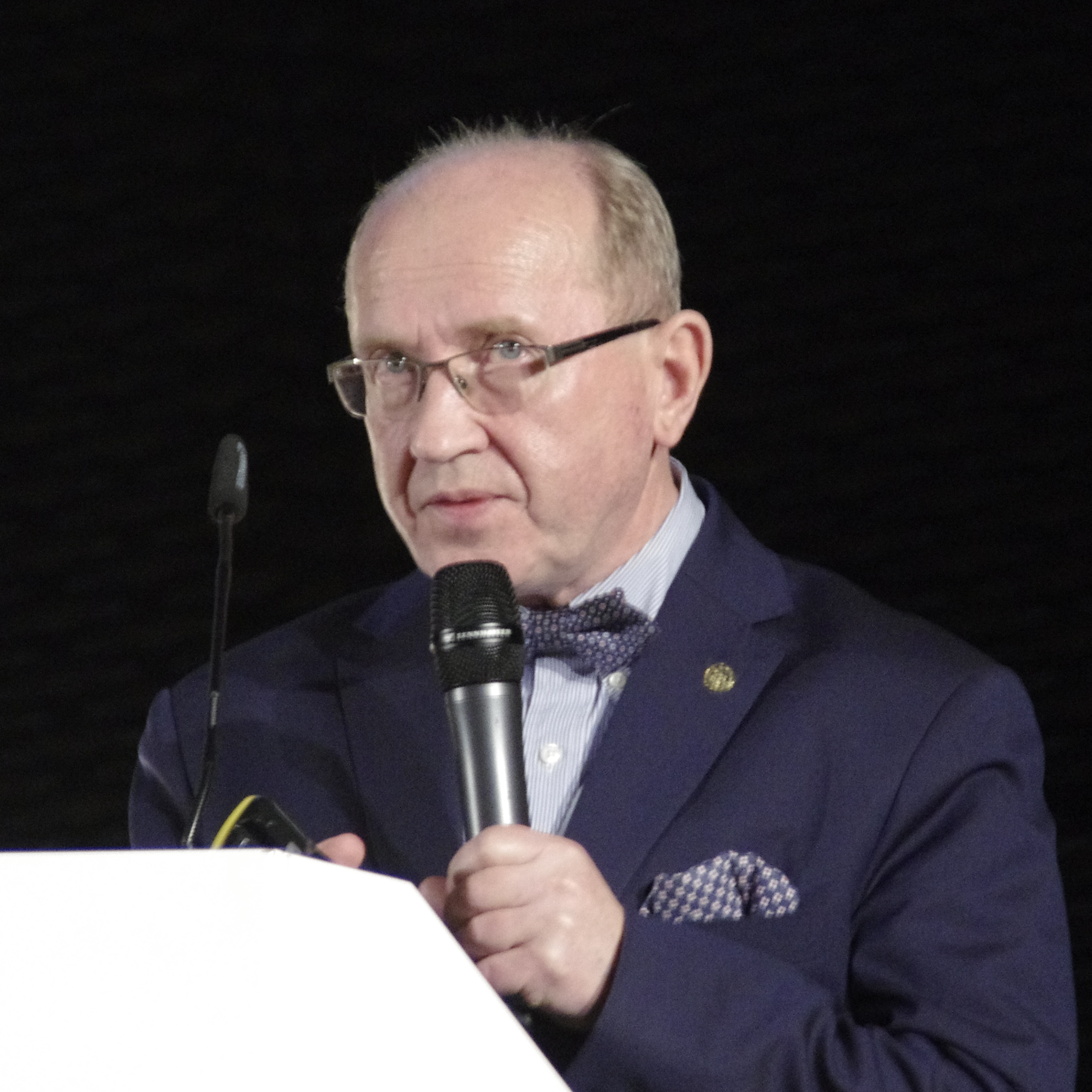
- Skarżyński in 2019
- Born: January 3, 1954 (age 72); Rosochate Kościelne, Poland
- Education: Medical Academy of Warsaw
- Medical career
- Profession: Doctor
- Institutions: The Institute of Physiology and Pathology of Hearing
- Sub-specialties: otolaryngologist, audiologist and phoniatrist
- Website: www.henrykskarzynski.pl

Henryk Skarzynski (born 1954) is a Polish doctor otolaryngologist, audiologist and phoniatrist, creator and director of Warsaw Institute of Physiology and Pathology of Hearing and World Hearing Center in Kajetany.

Professor Skarzynski is the author and co-author of numerous scientific works, he is a supervisor of PhD dissertations, member of scientific and foreign associations. He performed the first operation of cochlear implantation in Poland and Central Europe in 1992, restoring hearing ability to a partially deaf adult. Skarzynski calls this procedure "partial deafness cochlear implantation". He later performed the same procedure on a child in 2004.

== Biography ==
He graduated in 1979 with a Doctor of Medicine from the Medical Faculty of Medical Academy of Warsaw. He went to receive a PhD in medicine in 1983, and a habilitated PhD in 1989. He was made professor extraordinarius at the Medical Academy of Warsaw in 1993, and full Professor of Medicine in 1995. He was granted three honorary titles of doctor honoris causa - the Maria Grzegorowska Academy of Special Education in Warsaw in 2011, University of Warsaw and 2012 and Maria Curie Skłodowska University in Lublin in 2014.

== Achievements ==
=== Professional ===
- 1992 - Implementation of deafness treatment program in Poland using cochlear implants.
- 1998 - Implementation of deafness and cancer lesions treatment program in Poland using brain stem implants.
- 1998 - Implementation of early detection of hearing loss in newborns and infants program in Poland.
- 1999 - globally original program of universal hearing, speech and vision tests on the Internet.
- 2002 - July 12 the world's first cochlear implant surgery in an adult patient with partial deafness.
- 2003 - Poland's first cochlear implant surgery for middle ear. Dozens of new clinical procedures.
- 2004 - September - the first operation in the world of a child with partial hearing loss.

=== Scientific ===
- 2001 - development of new, original ways of the middle ear reconstructive surgery with the use of alloplastic materials (glass ionomers)
- 2002 - development of new diagnostic tools - audiometer Kuba Mikro
- 2002 – development of PDCI (Partial Deafness cochlear implantation) - unique in the world method of partial deafness treatment (PDT - Partial Deafness Treatment) that allows to correct the comfort of hearing using cochlear implant maintaining the present hearing.

=== Medical ===
- 2000 - development of the tasks assigned by the Minister of Health, worldly original multimedia programs for early detection of hearing, speech and vision defects.
- 2004 - development of telemedicine program: Home Rehabilitation Clinic
- 2005 - development of new device for universal hearing screening - Audiometer S
- 2005 - the first linkage of the implant and hearing aid in one ear
- 2007 - Telefitting - development of the world's first permanent system of remote supervision over the working process and ability to set the implant in patients wherever they are
- 2009 - development of the world's first device, "Sense Examination Platform" that evaluates the damage of hearing, speech and vision in screening

=== Organizational ===
- 2008 - the world's first bilateral hearing implantation to the brainstem
- 1993 - Founder of Diagnostic-Medical-Rehabilitation Center for the Deaf and Hard-of-hearing people "Cochlear Center" - the second facility in Europe
- 1996 - Creator and director of Institute of Physiology and Pathology of Hearing in Warsaw
- 2003 – Creator and founder of the International Centre of Hearing and Speech in Kajetany
- 2012 – Organizer of World Hearing Center w Kajetany

== Awards, distinctions and honours ==
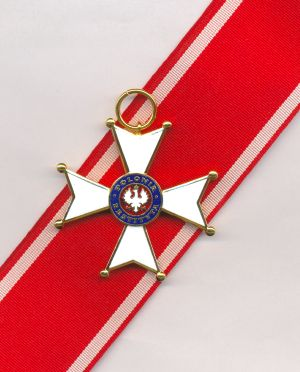
Polonia Restituta Commander Cross

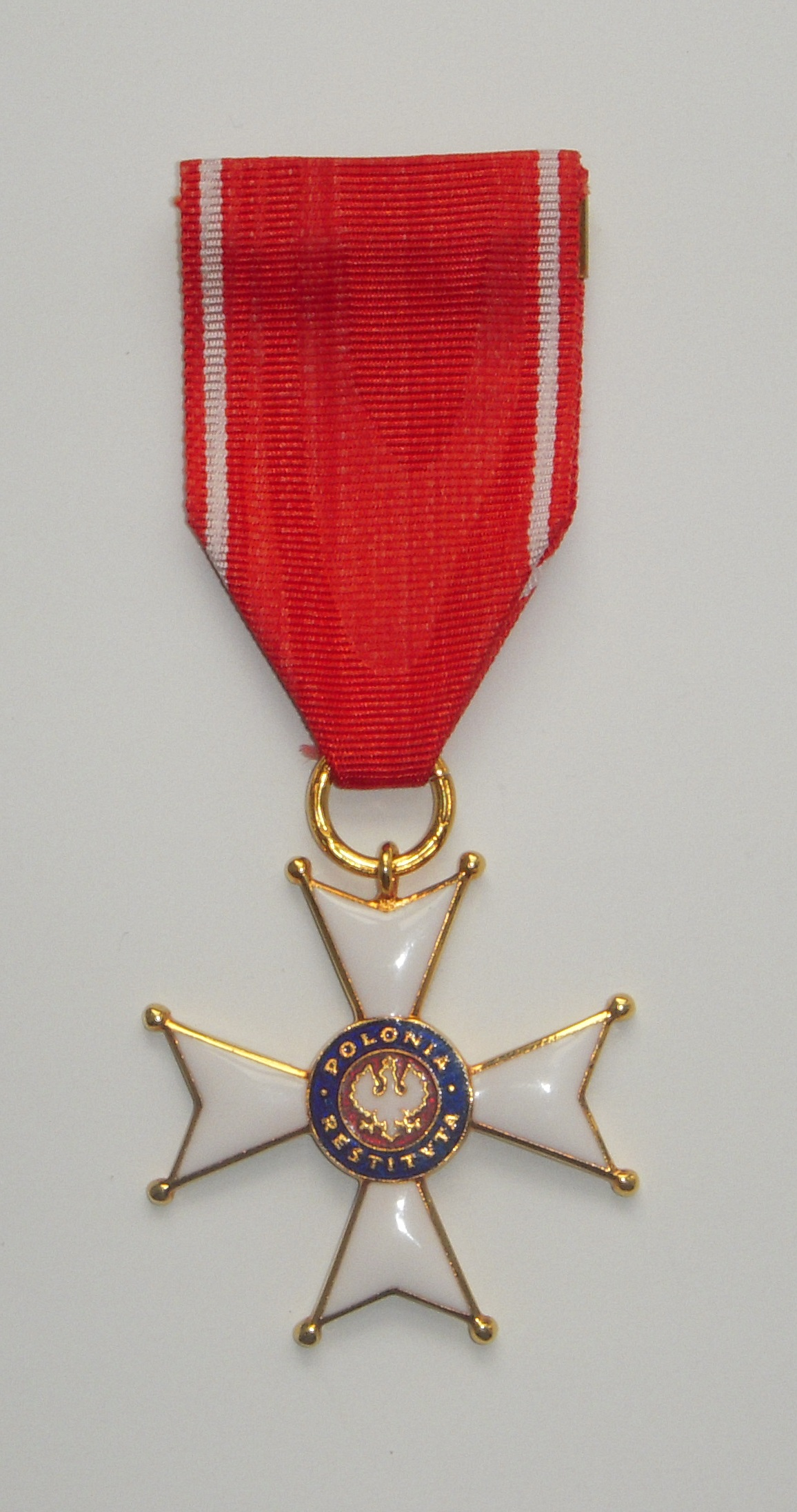
Polonia Restituta Knight Cross

- 1983 - 2000 the award of the Rector of the Medical Academy in Warsaw to Professor Henryk Skarżyński (four times)
- 1983 - Scientific Award of the Board of the Polish Society of ENT Head and Neck Surgeons under the name of prof. Jan Miodoński
- 1985 - Polish National Scientific Competition Award under the name of Tytus Chałubiński
- 1993 -
  - Polish Business Club Award for prof. H. Skarżyński for "Medical event in 1992"
  - The title "Varsovian of the Year 1992" ("Warszawiak Roku 1992") for the event of the year awarded to prof. H. Skarzynski by the readers of the Evening Express and viewers of the Warsaw Television Center
- 1994 - Award "Honorary Silver Ace" ("Honorowy Srebrny As") granted by Polish Promotion Corporation
- 2000 – Award by Committee for Scientific Research and television research journal "Proton" for outstanding scientific achievements - "The program of cochlear brainstem implantation in Poland"
- 2000 - Order Odrodzenia Polski Knight Cross
- 2002 - "Eskulap 2001″ award in the category "specialist physician" in the Mazovian Voivodeship awarded by Polish Nationwide Health Information Network and Mazovian Sickness Fund
- 2003
  - Award of the Rector of AGH University of Science and Technology "Lasting Imprint" ("Trwały Ślad") to Professor Henryk Skarżynski - Director of the Institute of Physiology and Pathology of Hearing for special achievements in health care
  - Prize of the City of Warsaw for prof. Henryk Skarżyński in recognition of his merits for the Capital of Republic of Poland awarded by the Council of the City of Warsaw
  - Medal and the title of Innovation for presenting at the International Fair of Economy and Science INTARG 2003 innovative solution named "Screening device Kuba – Mikro" awarded by the Jury
- 2004
  - Medal "Gloria Medicinae" for the prof. Henryk Skarżyński granted by the Chairman of the Polish Medical Association
  - Diploma "More Beautiful Poland" ("Piękniejsza Polska") by the Movement "More Beautiful Poland" under the patronage of Polish President Aleksander Kwaśniewski
  - Diploma "Success of the Year 2004" - the leader of Medicine in Public Health Protection awarded by the publisher Termedia
- 2005
  - Officer's Cross "Merite de I'Invention" of the Kingdom of Belgium
  - Award of Trust "Golden Otis 2004"
- 2007
  - Special prize "The Man of the Year 2007 in Healthcare"
  - The title "Man of Success 2006"
- 2008
  - Mention of the Ministry of Education and Science of Romania awarded during the Brussels Expo - INNOVA 2008
  - Officer's Cross "Labor Improdus Omnia Vincit" for scientific achievements, awarded at the Expo Brussels - INNOVA 2008
  - Team Award degree I to the prof. Henryk Skarżyński
- 2009
  - Award "Golden Scalpel 2008"
  - Award "Bene Meritum"
- 2010
  - Professor Henryk Skarżyński Honorary Citizen of Warsaw
  - "Oscar of the Polish Business XX"
  - Diploma at XLIV Congress of the Polish Society of Otorhinolaryngologists - Head and Neck Surgeons
  - Mention "Golden Scalpel 2010"
  - Ukrainian Order of Merit (for outstanding achievements in development of Polish-Ukrainian relationships)
- 2011
  - medal "For merits for FCUM"
  - fifth on the List of the Hundred Most Influential People in health care in *2010
  - Medal of Honor awarded by Mikheil Saakashvili (Georgia)
  - Medal under the name of Dr. Titus Chałubiński
  - Award Ecce Homo
- 2012
  - Krzyż Komandorski Order Odrodzenia Polski
- 2012 − Statue of Hippocrates - awarded by Polish Association of Family Medicine
- 2012 − GOlden Lider title
- 2012 − Economy Award of the President of Poland awarded in the category "Innovation"
- 2012 − The Outstanding Pole Title granted by The Polish Promotional Programme Foundation Teraz Polska
- 2012 − Copernicus Medal awarded at the request of the Department of Medical Sciences and based on the recommendations of the Chapter of the Copernicus Medal
- 2012 − Special Honorary Pearl of the Polish Economy awarded by the Polish Market
- 2012 − The Honorary Polish Congress Ambassador title
- 2012 − Prix Galien Elsevier Special Award in the category “Innovative IT"
- 2013
- 2013 − Personality of the Year 2012
- 2013 − 2nd most influential person in polish healthcare system
- 2013 − Medal named after Prof. Jan Nielubowicz of the Regional Medical Chamber
- 2013 − Viribus Unitis medal of the Confidence Award “Gold OTIS”
- 2013 - The Special Award and Medal of Prof. Zbigniew Religa awarded by the Foundation for Children „Help on Time”
- 2013 - second in the ranking of Professionals of Forbes 2013 from Mazovia Region
- 2013- „Poland Now” (Teraz Polska) Foundation acknowledged Prof. Henryk Skarżyński
- 2013 - the Knight of the Order of the Smile
- 2013 - Supervictoria in all- Poland economic plebiscite Victoria – Entrepreneurs’ Mark
- 2014
- 2014 - The Medal of the Warsaw University of Technology
- 2014 - Crystal Dragon of Success
- 2014 - Honorary Citizen of the CIty and Commune of Czyzew
- 2014 - The Man of Freedom awarded on the occasion of the 25th Anniversary of Polish Freedom Day
- 2014 - laureate of the plebiscite of the Ministry of Science and Higher Education "Science is Freedom"
- 2014 - Special Icebreaker award
- 2016 - Badge of Honor for Merit in the Protection of Children's Rights

== Bibliography ==
- Henryk Skarżyński: "New metod of partial deafness treatment" /in:/ Medical Science Monitor, 2003
- Henryk Skarżyński: "Zachowanie słuchu dla niskich częstotliowści u pacjentów z częściową głuchotą po wszczepieniu implantu ślimakowego" ( Preservation of low frequency hearing in partial deafness cochlear implantation (PDCI) using the round window surgical approach) /in:/ Acta Otolaryngolica 2004
- The world's first application of a new method of treatment of partial deafness in children was described by prof. Skarżyński et al. in two world scientific journals:
  - Skarzyński Henryk; Lorens Artur; Piotrowska Anna; Anderson Ilona. Partial deafness cochlear implantation in children. International Journal of Pediatric Otorhinolaryngology 71(9):1407-13 (2007)
  - Skarzynski H, Lorens A. Cochlear Implants and Hearing Preservation. Electric Acoustic Stimulation in Children W: Van de Heyning P, Kleine Punte A (eds): Cochlear Implants and Hearing Preservation. Adv Otorhinolaryngol. Basel, Karger, 2010, vol 67, pp 135–143 doi:10.1159/000262605
  - Shulman A. Tinnitus: Pathophysiology and Treatment Volume 166 (Progress in Brain Research). Int Tinnitus J. 2009;15(1):108-110
