= Institute of Sensory Organs =

Research institute in Kajetany, Polsnd

The Institute of Sensory Organs is a research institute in Kajetany, Poland, established in 2008. Its legal form is presented by limited liability company.

== Activity ==
The main tasks are:

- designing, conducting and implementing the research and scientific works in the scope of prophylaxis, diagnosis, treatment and rehabilitation related to sense organ diseases
- conducting trainings and workshops.

== Projects ==
- development, testing and implementation of the Senses Organs Examination Platform software designed to conduct screening trials of hearing, sight and speech in children, youth and persons with particular education needs
- organising training workshops related to the modern otosurgery in the scope of hearing implants.

== Awards ==
2009

- Gold Medal with Menton - At the 58th International Exhibition of Innovation, Research and New Technologies “BRUSSELS INNOVA 2009”, City of Brussels

2010

- Award of the Minister of Science and Higher Education, Warsaw
- The title of the 2010 Innovation Leader for the solution “Senses Examination Platform”, Katowice
- Gold Medal at the 38th International “INVENTIONS GENEVA” Inventions Exchange, Geneva
- Special award of the Republic of Iran granted by the ISFAHAN UNIVERSITY OF TECHNOLOGY ROBOTIC CENTER at the 38th International Inventions Exhibition “INVENTIONS GENEVA”, Geneva
- Silver medal, Concours Lépine 2010, Paris
- Gold medal, 21st International Invention, Innovation and Technology Exhibition ITEX 2010, Kuala Lumpur
- Special prize of the Korea Invention Promotion Association at the 21st International Invention, Innovation and Technology Exhibition ITEX 2010, Kuala Lumpur
- Special prize of the Association „ Russian House for International Scientific Technological Cooperation” at the 21st International Invention, Innovation and Technology Exhibition ITEX 2010, Kuala Lumpur
- Gold medal, VI International Salon of Inventions and New Technologies “NEW TIME”, Sevastopol
- Silver medal, 6th Taipei International Invention Show & Technomart „INST 2010”, Taipei
- Gold medal, IV International Warsaw Invention Show „IWIS 2010”, Warsaw
- Gold medal, 62nd IENA Nuremberg International Trade Show – “Ideas-Inventions-New Products”, Nuremberg
- Special award of the "Taiwan Invention Association" at the Seoul International Invention Fair 2010, Seoul
- Gold medal at the International Inventions Fair, Seoul
- Gold medal for the Home Rehabilitation Clinic, at the International Inventions Fair, Seoul
- Special prize for the Home Rehabilitation Clinic, awarded by the Association "Russian House for International Scientific and Technological Cooperation" at the International Inventions Fair, Seoul

2011

- Award of the Minister of Science and Higher Education, Warsaw

== Cooperation ==
- The Institute of Physiology and Pathology of Hearing
- Center of Hearing and Speech "MEDINCUS"
