= Agnieszka Radwańska =

Polish tennis player (born 1989)

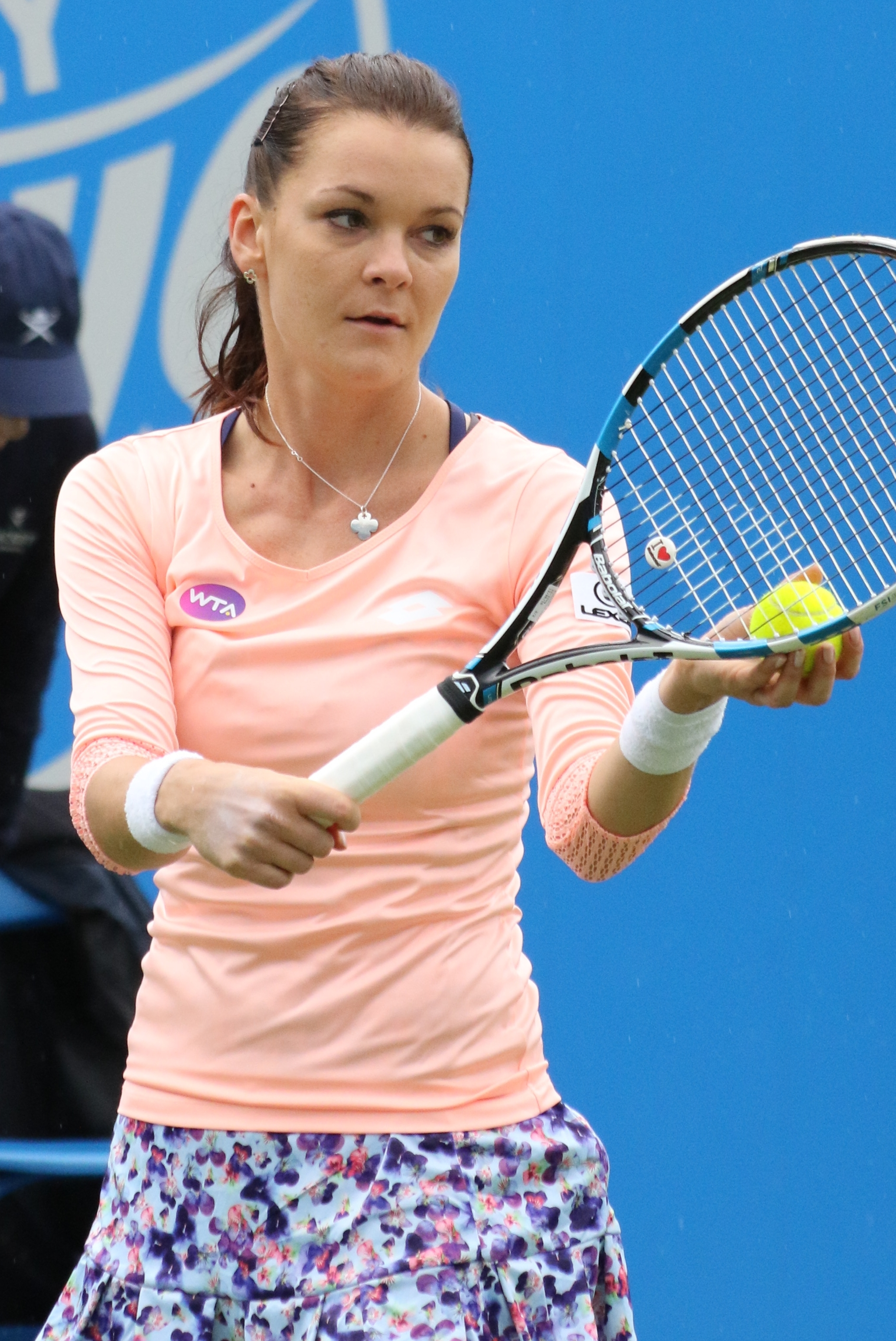
- Radwańska in 2016
- Full name: Agnieszka Roma Radwańska
- Country (sports): Poland
- Born: 6 March 1989 (age 37) Kraków, Poland
- Height: 1.73 m (5 ft 8 in)
- Turned pro: 23 April 2005
- Retired: 14 November 2018
- Plays: Right-handed (two-handed backhand)
- Prize money: US$27,683,807: 14th in all-time rankings
- Official website: agaradwanska.com

Singles
- Career record: 594–269
- Career titles: 20
- Highest ranking: No. 2 (9 July 2012)

Grand Slam singles results
- Australian Open: SF (2014, 2016)
- French Open: QF (2013)
- Wimbledon: F (2012)
- US Open: 4R (2007, 2008, 2012, 2013, 2016)

Other tournaments
- Tour Finals: W (2015)
- Olympic Games: 2R (2008)

Doubles
- Career record: 113–87
- Career titles: 2
- Highest ranking: No. 16 (10 October 2011)

Grand Slam doubles results
- Australian Open: SF (2010)
- French Open: QF (2009, 2010)
- Wimbledon: 3R (2007, 2011, 2012)
- US Open: SF (2011)

Grand Slam mixed doubles results
- Wimbledon: 1R (2007)
- US Open: QF (2007)

Team competitions
- Fed Cup: 42–11
- Hopman Cup: W (2015)

Agnieszka Roma Radwańska (Polish: [aɡˈɲɛʂka raˈdvaj̃ska]; born 6 March 1989) is a Polish former professional tennis player and current coach. She was ranked world No. 2 in women's singles by the Women's Tennis Association (WTA), in July 2012. Radwańska won 20 WTA Tour singles titles, including the 2015 WTA Finals, and two doubles titles. She was also the runner-up at the 2012 Wimbledon Championships.

Radwańska was the first Pole in the Open Era to contest a major singles final (at the 2012 Wimbledon Championships), the first to win the WTA Finals, the first to claim a WTA Tour singles title (the 2007 Nordic Light Open), and was part of the first Polish team to win the Hopman Cup in 2015. She was named the Newcomer of the Year in 2006, and finished with a top-10 year-end ranking eight times. Radwańska's accomplishments among Polish players have only recently been surpassed by those of Iga Świątek.

Radwańska was voted the WTA's Fan Favorite Singles Player for six consecutive years (2011–2016), the most of any player, in polls held by WTATennis.com. She also won the Fan Favorite Shot of the Year for five consecutive years (2013–2017). For her accomplishments in sport and for representing her country with distinction, in 2013 she was awarded the Gold Cross of Merit by Polish President Bronisław Komorowski. Radwańska retired from professional tennis in November 2018, at the age of 29. In December 2024, she began coaching Magda Linette.

== Personal life ==
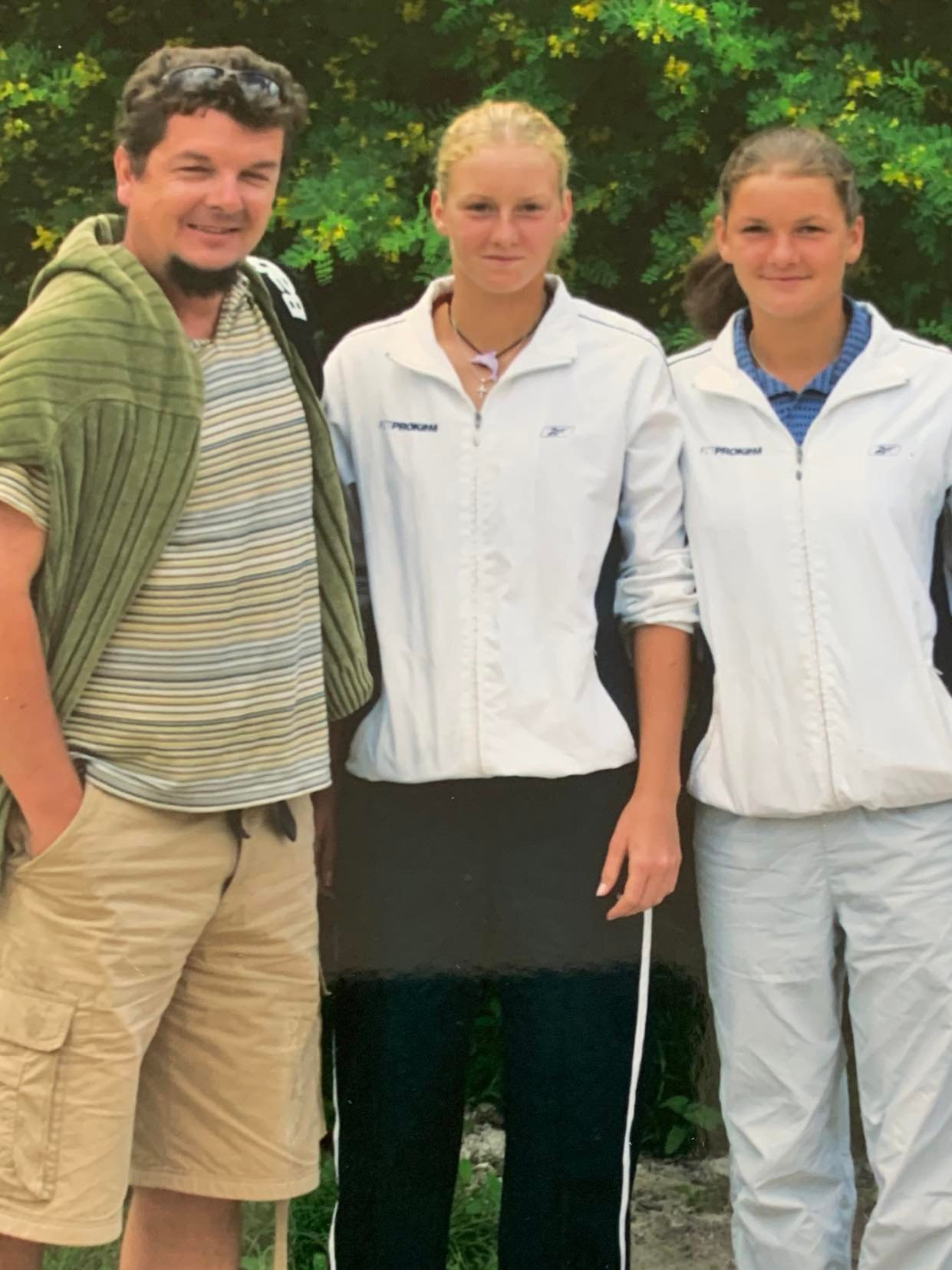
Radwańska with her father and sister, Urszula Radwanska

Born in Kraków to Robert Radwański, and his wife, Marta, Radwańska began playing tennis at the age of four after her father introduced her to the sport. Her younger sister, Urszula, is also a tennis player. Radwańska named Pete Sampras and Martina Hingis as inspirations. In 2009, Radwańska became a WTA ambassador for Habitat for Humanity. She has also studied tourism at universities in Kraków.

Radwańska is a practising Roman Catholic, and she took part in the Catholic campaign in her native country "Nie wstydzę się Jezusa!" ("I'm not ashamed of Jesus!"). She released a video for the campaign in which she urged her fans to "not be ashamed of believing" and arranged her tennis balls so they would read "JEZUS" ("JESUS"). In the summer of 2013, she was disqualified from this campaign after posing nude for ESPN magazine's The Body Issue.

According to Forbes, in 2012 she was the ninth-highest-earning female athlete in the world.

In 2016, Radwańska got engaged to Dawid Celt, a Polish former tennis player who was also her hitting partner, and current coach of Top 50 player Magda Linette. Their engagement was accidentally revealed by her friend, Caroline Wozniacki, on 7 September 2016. On 22 July 2017, they married surrounded by family, friends and her WTA and ATP peers. In attendance were Aga's younger sister Urszula, Angelique Kerber, Caroline Wozniacki, former Polish No. 1 Marta Domachowska, Alicja Rosolska, Katarzyna Piter, Wimbledon doubles Champion Łukasz Kubot, Mariusz Fyrstenberg, Marcin Matkowski and also former Wimbledon semifinalist Jerzy Janowicz. The wedding ceremony took place at the Church of St Michael the Archangel and St Stanislaus Bishop and Martyr, Pauline Fathers Monastery, Skałka, in Kraków, Poland, where Radwańska was baptized.

In March 2019, Radwańska partnered with Italian professional dancer Stefano Terrazzino to participate in the next edition of Dancing with the Stars: Taniec z gwiazdami. It is the Polish version of the BBC's popular Dancing with the Stars/Strictly Come Dancing franchise, which has been sold to more than 40 countries worldwide. Aga donated her prize money from Taniec z Gwiazdami (season 22) to UNICEF charity.

In January 2020, Radwańska announced that she was pregnant with her first child. Shortly after celebrating her third wedding anniversary, Radwańska had her first child, a son.

== Career ==
=== 2005–2006: Junior years ===
Radwańska won the junior singles title at Wimbledon in 2005, defeating Tamira Paszek. She went on to win the French Open junior title in 2006 with a victory over Anastasia Pavlyuchenkova. She played her first WTA tournament at the 2006 J&S Cup (later known as the Warsaw Open), defeating Anastasia Myskina in her opening match. She advanced to the quarterfinals, where she lost to Elena Dementieva in three sets.

At the 2006 Wimbledon Championships, she lost in the fourth round to Kim Clijsters. She went on to drop a second-round match to Tatiana Golovin at the US Open. At the Fortis Championships Luxembourg tournament, Radwańska lost in the semifinals to Francesca Schiavone after defeating former world No. 1, Venus Williams, in the second round, and Dementieva in the quarterfinals.

=== 2007–2008: First WTA Tour title and breakthrough ===
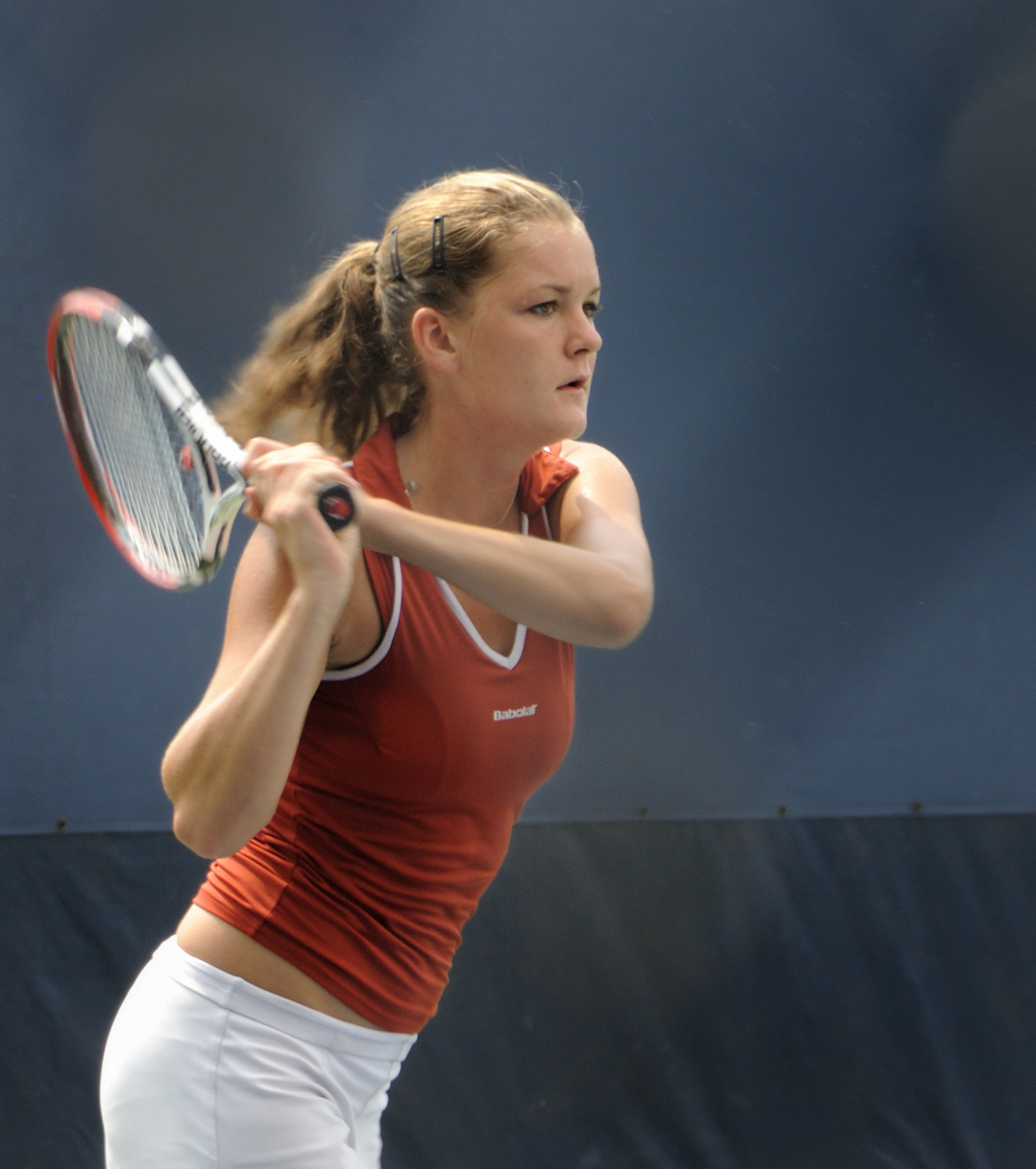
Radwańska in action at the 2008 US Open

Radwańska participated at the 2007 Australian Open, where she lost to Ana Ivanovic in the second round. At the Sony Ericsson Open, Radwańska defeated her longtime idol, Martina Hingis, in a three-set third-round match. She exited in the fourth round following a loss to Tathiana Garbin.

In August 2007, Radwańska became the first Polish player to claim a WTA tour singles title, defeating Vera Dushevina in the final of the Nordic Light Open. She went on to defeat defending champion Maria Sharapova in the third round of the US Open, before losing to Israeli Shahar Pe'er in the fourth round.

She reached the quarterfinals of the 2008 Australian Open, upsetting world No. 2 Svetlana Kuznetsova in the third round, then following it up with a defeat of 14th seeded Nadia Petrova before eventually falling to Daniela Hantuchová. At the Thailand Open, Radwańska won her second WTA singles title, beating Jill Craybas in the final. At the Qatar Ladies Open, Radwańska reached the semifinals, losing to eventual champion Maria Sharapova.

On grass, Radwańska won the Eastbourne International, defeating Nadia Petrova in the final. At Wimbledon, she defeated Kuznetsova in the fourth round, then lost to Serena Williams in the quarterfinals. At the Olympics in Beijing, Radwańska lost a second-round match to Francesca Schiavone. She went on to reach the fourth round of the US Open, losing to Venus Williams. She later went to the Tour Championships as an alternate and replaced Ana Ivanovic after the latter withdrew. She defeated Svetlana Kuznetsova in straight sets. Radwańska ended the year as the first Polish woman to surpass US$1 million in career prize money, as well as the first to be ranked world No. 10.

=== 2009–2010: Top 10 ===
Radwańska reached the quarterfinals of the Sydney International, losing in three sets to eventual champion Elena Dementieva. She was defeated in the first round of the Australian Open by Kateryna Bondarenko.

She reached her first semifinal of the 2009 season in Tokyo, where she fell in three sets to eventual champion Maria Sharapova. She reached her first final of the year in China, losing in straight sets to Svetlana Kuznetsova.

Radwańska and her doubles partner Maria Kirilenko reached the semifinals of the 2010 Australian Open, losing to the world No. 1 pairing of Cara Black and Liezel Huber in three sets. In Indian Wells, Radwańska won her fifth straight match against Marion Bartoli, and went on to upset Elena Dementieva in the quarterfinals before losing to Caroline Wozniacki in the semifinals. Radwańska entered the 2010 Sony Ericsson Open, where she was defeated in the quarterfinals by Venus Williams. At Wimbledon, she was defeated in the fourth round by Li Na, whom she had beaten at the same stage the previous year.

Radwańska reached the final of the Southern California Open in San Diego, falling to Svetlana Kuznetsova. Due to a stress fracture in her foot, Radwańska's 2010 season ended at the China Open, where she lost a three-set match to Angelique Kerber.

=== 2011: Asian double in Tokyo and Beijing ===
Radwańska reached the quarterfinals of the Australian Open, losing to eventual champion Kim Clijsters. She went on to reach the fourth round in Indian Wells, where she lost to Victoria Azarenka, and the quarterfinals in Miami, losing to Vera Zvonareva. However, she won the Miami doubles title with Daniela Hantuchová, defeating Nadia Petrova and Liezel Huber. She went on to reach the fourth round of the French Open, losing to Maria Sharapova.

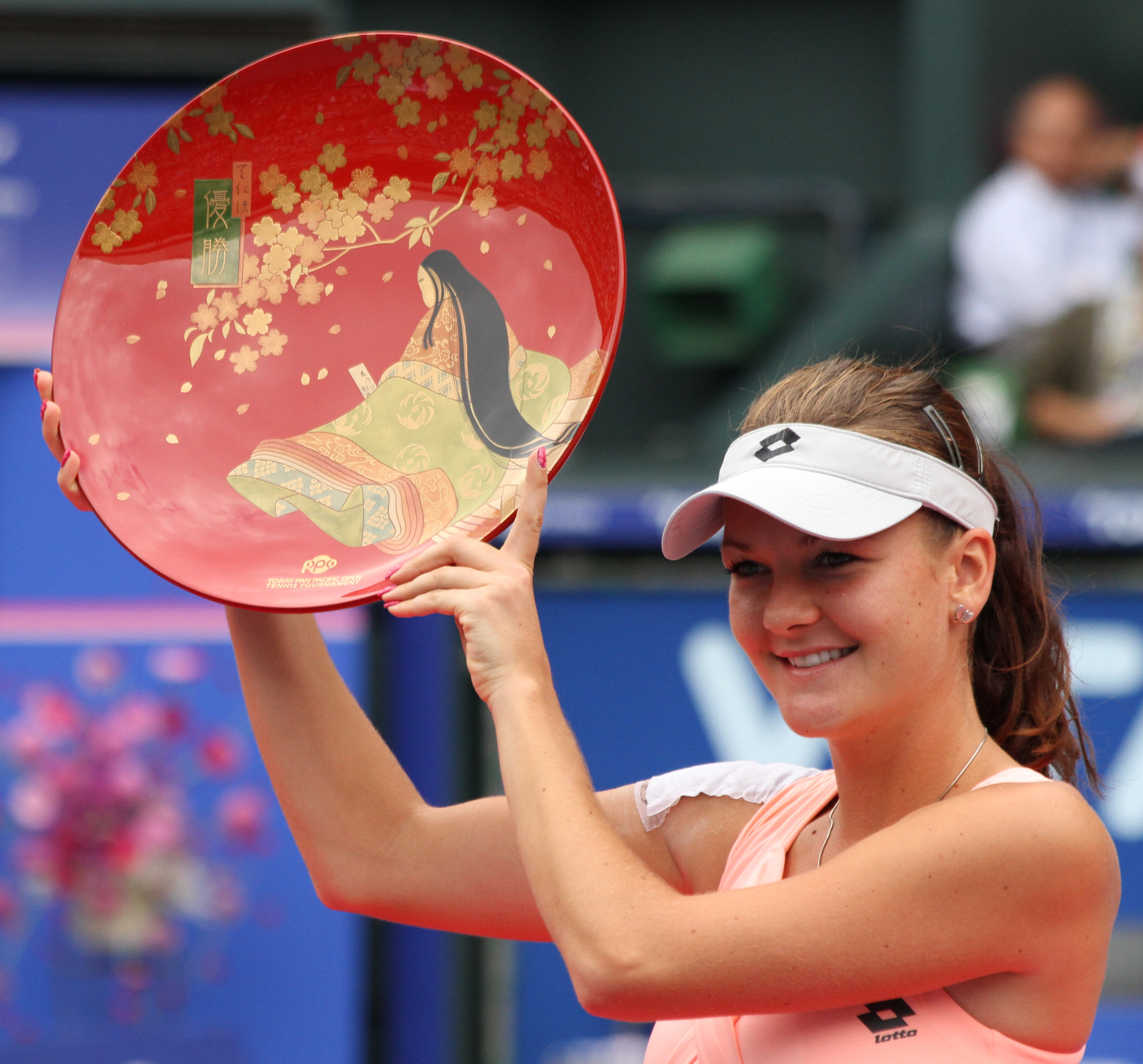
Radwańska after winning the 2011 Pan Pacific Open

Radwańska suffered her earliest ever exit at Wimbledon, when she was defeated in the second round by Czech qualifier Petra Cetkovská. At the San Jose Open, Radwańska advanced to the final and defeated rival Vera Zvonareva, in straight sets. With the victory, she earned her first title since winning in Eastbourne in 2008. At the Rogers Cup in Toronto, she once again defeated Zvonareva in the third round, coming back from a 0–4 deficit in the second set. She went on to lose a three-set semifinal match against Samantha Stosur.

After defeating her sister Urszula in the first round of the US Open, she was upset in the second round by eventual semifinalist Angelique Kerber. She avenged this loss at the Toray Pan Pacific Open, defeating Kerber in three sets before advancing to the final, where she won her third straight match against Vera Zvonareva, earning her first Premier 5 title.

At the China Open, she defeated Zheng Jie, Sofia Arvidsson, Ana Ivanovic (who retired from their quarterfinal match due to a back injury), and Flavia Pennetta in straight sets, before winning a three-set final against Andrea Petkovic. She qualified for her first season-ending championship in Istanbul, taking the 8th spot when Marion Bartoli was unable to win the title in Moscow. Going into the Tour Championships, Radwańska was labeled by the media as one of the hottest players on tour. She dropped a three-set opening match to Caroline Wozniacki. She then won her fourth straight match against Vera Zvonareva, coming back from a 3–5 deficit in the third set and saving three match points. To advance to the semifinals, she needed to win at least one set against Petra Kvitová, but lost in straight sets. She ended the year ranked 8th with a 46–18 record, and was named WTA Fan Favorite Singles Player. Going into the Tour Championships, Radwańska was labeled by the media as one of the hottest players on tour. She dropped a three-set opening match to Caroline Wozniacki. She then won her fourth straight match against Vera Zvonareva, coming back from a 3–5 deficit in the third set and saving three match points. To advance to the semifinals, she needed to win at least one set against Petra Kvitová, but lost in straight sets. She ended the year ranked 8th with a 46–18 record, and was named WTA Fan Favorite Singles Player.

=== 2012: World No. 2 and Wimbledon final ===
During the first four months of 2012, Radwańska won two singles titles and amassed a record of 28–5, defeating all opponents but then-world No. 1, Victoria Azarenka.

Following losses to Azarenka at Sydney, the Australian Open, and the Qatar Open, she won her first title of the season at the Dubai Championships, defeating Julia Görges in straight sets. After advancing to the quarterfinals in Indian Wells, she reached a new ranking of world No. 4. Her second title came at the Miami Open, where she defeated Venus Williams in the quarterfinals and Marion Bartoli in the semifinals, advancing to a championship match against Maria Sharapova. Radwańska won the championship without losing a set throughout the tournament.

Her fifth loss of the season, and fifth to Azarenka, came in the semifinals of the Porsche Tennis Grand Prix in Stuttgart. She then entered the Madrid Open, where she lost to Azarenka in the semifinals, securing the world No. 3 ranking. At the Italian Open, she lost her opening-round match to Petra Cetkovská, marking her first loss of the year to someone other than Azarenka. In the final of the Brussels Open, Radwańska defeated Simona Halep in straight sets, winning her third WTA title of the year and tenth in her career. At the French Open, she defeated Venus Williams in the second round, but then fell in the third round to Svetlana Kuznetsova.

Radwańska reached her first career Grand Slam final at Wimbledon. She defeated Maria Kirilenko in the quarterfinals and Angelique Kerber in the semifinals, losing the championship match to Serena Williams in three sets. By advancing to the final, she became the first Polish player in the Open Era to reach the championship round of a Grand Slam singles tournament, and attained a new ranking of world No. 2. Radwańska was the flag bearer for Poland in the 2012 Summer Olympics. She lost in the opening round to Julia Görges.

During the summer hardcourt season Radwańska was twice one match away from becoming the world No. 1. She would lose to Li Na on both occasions, in the quarterfinals of the Rogers Cup and the Cincinnati Open. Radwańska was defeated in the fourth round of the US Open by Roberta Vinci. She again reached the final of the Toray Pan Pacific Open, losing in three sets to Nadia Petrova. She exited the China Open following a quarterfinal loss to Li Na. Radwańska won her opening round-robin match at the WTA Championships, defeating the defending champion Petra Kvitová in straight sets. She then lost a three-set match to Maria Sharapova. She advanced to the semifinals with a victory over Sara Errani, which marked the longest three-set match in the history of the tournament, but exited following a loss to Serena Williams. She then defeated Williams in straight sets during an exhibition in Toronto. At the conclusion of the season, Radwańska won WTA awards for Fan Favorite Facebook Profile and Fan Favorite Video, and was again named Fan Favorite Singles Player.

=== 2013: Three WTA titles ===
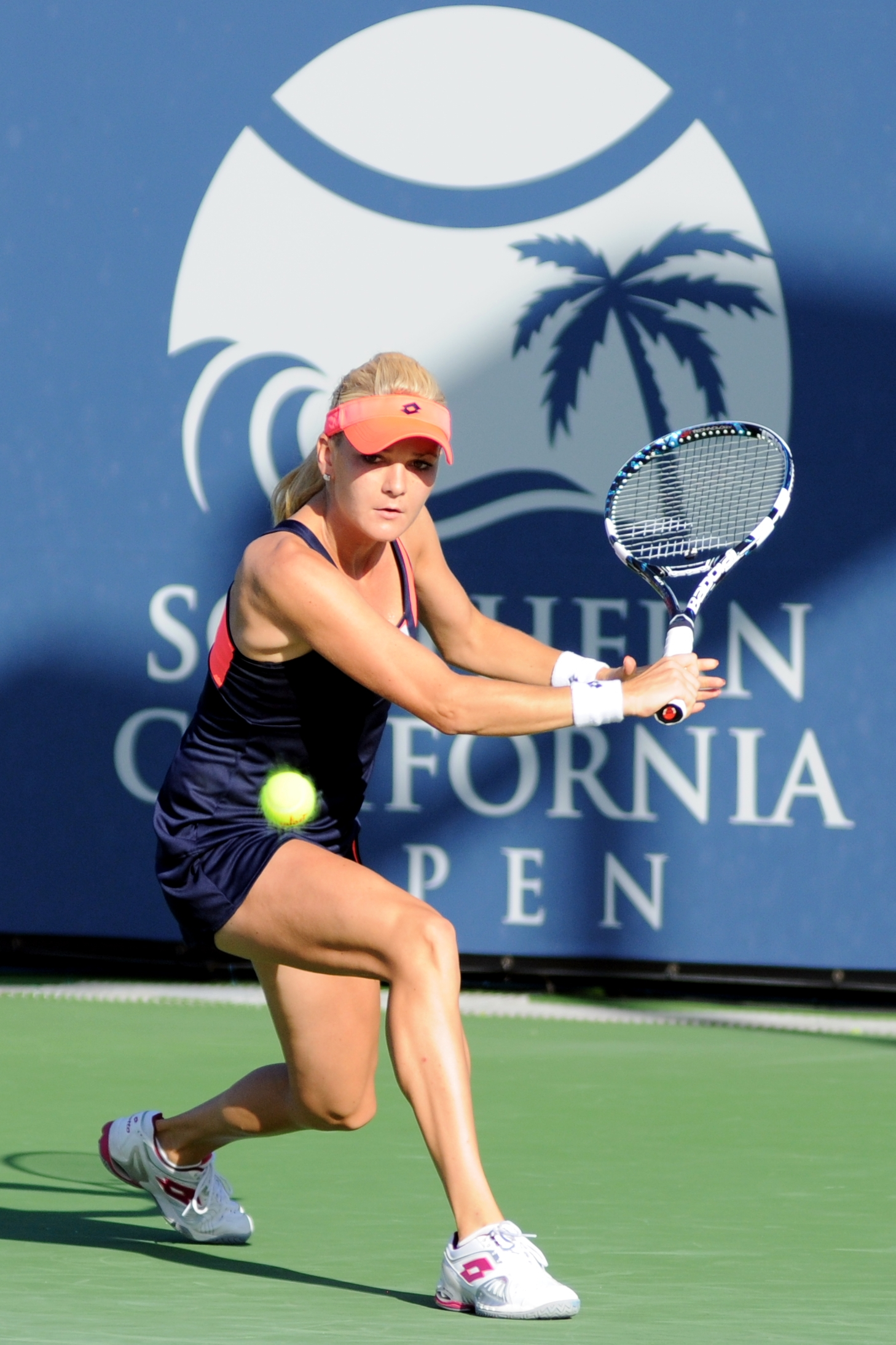
Radwańska during 2013 Southern California Open quarterfinals

Radwańska began her season at the Auckland Open, where she defeated Yanina Wickmayer in the final to win the 11th singles title of her career. She won her second straight tournament of 2013 at the Sydney International, where she defeated Dominika Cibulková without losing a game. Radwańska reached the quarterfinals of the Australian Open, exiting the tournament following a loss to Li Na. She went on to play the Qatar Total Open where she was eliminated in the semifinals by then-world No. 1 Victoria Azarenka, the eventual champion. She also reached the quarterfinals in Dubai, where she lost to Petra Kvitová. In the BNP Paribas Open, she lost in the fourth round to Maria Kirilenko.

She then entered the Sony Open as the defending champion. During her quarterfinal win against Kirsten Flipkens, Radwańska won a point with a spinning backhand volley, which was voted the shot of the year on the WTA's website. She exited the tournament with a loss to Serena Williams in the semifinals. After early losses in her clay court season, she advanced to the quarterfinals of the French Open for the first time, where she lost to fifth seed Sara Errani. She beat Li Na in the quarterfinals of Wimbledon but lost her semifinal match to Sabine Lisicki. She was later awarded the Gold Cross of Merit by Polish President Bronislaw Komorowski.

Her next tournament was the Stanford Classic, where she received a bye into the second round and beat Francesca Schiavone for a place in the quarterfinals. She then beat Varvara Lepchenko, as well as Jamie Hampton, losing to Dominika Cibulková in the final. In September, Radwańska defeated Anastasia Pavlyuchenkova to win the KDB Korea Open, her third singles title of 2013. She was eliminated from the WTA Championships in the round robin stage, exiting with a loss to Angelique Kerber. At the conclusion of the season, Radwańska was voted WTA Fan Favorite Singles Player for the third consecutive year.

=== 2014: Australian Open semifinal & out of top 5 ===
Radwańska began the 2014 season by representing Poland at the Hopman Cup, where she competed alongside her compatriot, Grzegorz Panfil. The pair advanced to the final where Radwańska defeated Alizé Cornet in their singles match. However, she and Panfil lost to Cornet and Jo-Wilfried Tsonga in the deciding mixed doubles match.

Following the Hopman Cup, Radwańska failed to defend her title at the Sydney International, losing to Bethanie Mattek-Sands in the second round. Radwańska defeated Victoria Azarenka to reach her first Australian Open semifinal, but lost to Dominika Cibulková. Radwańska also reached the semifinal of the Qatar Total Open in Doha, losing to eventual champion Simona Halep. She avenged her loss Halep in the semifinal of the Indian Wells Masters, reaching the final for the first time in her career. Partly due to a knee injury, Radwańska was defeated by Flavia Pennetta. She was in tears while apologizing to the crowd afterward, saying she was unable to run. She then advanced to the quarterfinals in Miami, where she lost in three sets to Dominika Cibulková.

In April, Radwańska played in the Katowice Open, about 47 miles from her home town in Kraków. Following victories over Kristýna Plíšková, Francesca Schiavone, and Yvonne Meusburger, she lost a three-set semifinal to Alizé Cornet. Radwańska, who was playing on the WTA Tour in Poland for the first time in seven years, stated: "I'm really excited. I still have vivid memories of my first ever WTA main draw event at the Premier event in Warsaw in 2006. As a 17-year-old girl, I managed to beat 2004 French Open champion Anastasia Myskina in the first round. I couldn't imagine a better debut. So my tennis career really began in my home country and I'm thankful for this opportunity."

She reached the quarterfinals of the Porsche Grand Prix in Stuttgart and the semifinals of the Madrid Open, losing both matches to Maria Sharapova. At the Internazionali d'Italia in Rome, she lost in the quarterfinals to Jelena Janković. Following early exits at the French Open and Eastbourne International, she advanced to the fourth round of Wimbledon, but lost to Ekaterina Makarova.

At the Rogers Cup in Montreal, Radwańska defeated Barbora Záhlavová-Strýcová, Sabine Lisicki, Victoria Azarenka and Ekaterina Makarova to reach the final, where she defeated Venus Williams to win her first title of the season and the first Canadian Open of her career. Following her win at Rogers Cup she competed at the Western & Southern Open, where she defeated Kurumi Nara and Sabine Lisicki before losing in the quarterfinals to Caroline Wozniacki.

At the US Open, Radwańska beat Sharon Finchman in the first round but lost in straight sets to Peng Shuai in the next round. In September, Radwańska played at the Kia Korea Open, where she defeated Polona Hercog and Chanelle Scheepers. She then faced Varvara Lepchenko in the quarterfinals but could not avenge her loss to Lepchenko at Stanford earlier, losing in three sets again. Radwańska then lost to Caroline Garcia in the second round at Wuhan Open. In her next tournament at Beijing, she beat CoCo Vandeweghe before losing to Roberta Vinci in the second round.

At the WTA Finals, she was drawn into the White Group alongside Maria Sharapova, Petra Kvitová, and Caroline Wozniacki. She defeated Petra Kvitová in her opening round-robin group match but lost close matches to Maria Sharapova and Caroline Wozniacki. Despite her 1–2 record, she placed second in her group and advanced to the semifinals, losing to Simona Halep. She ended the year ranked world No. 6.

Following the season's conclusion, Radwańska again defeated one of her childhood idols, Martina Hingis, in a one-set match as part of a team event at the Champions Tennis League in India. Hingis then defeated Radwańska in their next meeting at the event.

Throughout 2014, Radwańska won the WTA accolade for Shot of the Month on four occasions, won Shot of the Year for an overhead backhand in Montreal, and, for the fourth consecutive season, won the WTA Award for Fan Favorite Player. She expressed gratitude toward fans and called the win an "honor."

=== 2015: WTA Finals champion ===
At the end of the 2014 season, Radwańska hired Martina Navratilova as part of her coaching team, with the specific goal of winning a Grand Slam title. She started 2015 by teaming with Jerzy Janowicz to win the Hopman Cup, Poland's first title in the event. The victory included Radwańska's first win over Serena Williams in a singles match. Radwańska competed in Sydney, where she defeated Alizé Cornet but lost to Garbiñe Muguruza in the second round. She reached the fourth round of Australian Open, where she lost to Venus Williams for the first time since 2010, in three sets.

In February, Radwańska played in Dubai and Doha, where she recorded wins over Caroline Garcia and Flavia Pennetta, but lost for the second time in a year to Muguruza and Venus Williams, respectively. She then progressed to Indian Wells where she lost in the third round to Heather Watson. After that, she competed in the Miami Open, where she lost to Carla Suárez Navarro in the fourth round.

In April, Radwańska participated for the second time in her career at Katowice Open in Poland, where she defeated Yanina Wickmayer, An-Sophie Mestach, Klára Koukalová before losing to Camila Giorgi in the semifinals.

Shortly after Radwańska's first-round loss at Stuttgart Open, Martina Navratilova stated that she was too busy to continue in her part-time role as Radwańska's consulting coach. Radwańska stated, "I just wanted to thank Martina for her time and efforts over these last few months. It was a great experience to work with one of the all-time greats. However, we both agreed that as Martina could not commit 100% to the project then it was not going to work as a long-term partnership."

At the Madrid Open, Radwańska defeated Lara Arruabarrena and Casey Dellacqua before losing to Caroline Wozniacki in the third round. As a result of this loss, Radwańska dropped outside of the Top 10 for the first time since October 2011. At the French Open, Radwańska was defeated by Annika Beck in the first round. The loss marked only her third first-round loss at a Grand Slam in her career, and her first since the 2009 Australian Open. In June, Radwańska competed in her first grass-court tournament at Nottingham where she advanced to the semifinals, losing to Monica Niculescu. In her next grass tournament at Eastbourne, she defeated Irina Falconi, Karolína Plíšková, and Tsvetana Pironkova to reach the semifinals of a grass event for the second time in three weeks, after doing so at Nottingham. After defeating Sloane Stephens, Radwańska reached her first final of the season against Belinda Bencic, who defeated her in three sets to claim her first WTA title.

Radwańska then started her Wimbledon campaign just three days after her final at Eastbourne. During the first week she defeated Lucie Hradecká, Ajla Tomljanović and Casey Dellacqua, all in straight sets. She then defeated Jelena Janković and Madison Keys to advance to the semifinals where she faced Garbiñe Muguruza. In her third Wimbledon semifinal in four years, Radwańska ended up losing the match in three sets. After her successful run at Wimbledon, Radwańska returned to the top 10, after she dropped outside in early May this year.

Radwańska began her summer hardcourt season at the Bank of the West Classic, where she lost a tight three-set match to Angelique Kerber in the quarterfinals. As the defending champion at the Rogers Cup, Radwańska defeated Julia Görges and Alizé Cornet before losing to Simona Halep in the quarterfinal. Due to her first-round loss at the Western & Southern Open, Radwańska decided to participate at the Connecticut Open, where she defeated CoCo Vandeweghe and Alizé Cornet but lost to Petra Kvitová in the quarterfinals. At US Open, she defeated Kateřina Siniaková and Magda Linette before losing to Madison Keys in the third round.

At the Pan Pacific Open in Tokyo Radwańska defeated CoCo Vandeweghe, Elina Svitolina, Karolína Plíšková, Dominika Cibulková and Belinda Bencic to win her first title of the season. Radwańska also took the Toray Pan-Pacific in 2011, and is the first player to have won the event twice since it moved outdoors, and onto a hard court, in 2008. "This is the first tournament I have won twice, so it's very special for me", said Radwańska. She added, "I really didn't expect that kind of score against Belinda, she's playing so well. I'm never going to be a powerful tennis player, even if I spend the whole day in the gym. That's the way I play, trying to find a way to beat those stronger players."

Only 36 hours after her win in Tokyo Radwańska competed at the Wuhan Open tournament in China where she lost to Venus Williams for a third time this season. Following the Wuhan Open, Radwańska found herself at No. 9 on the Road to Singapore, 5 points behind Carla Suárez Navarro and 15 points behind Angelique Kerber. At her next scheduled tournament, the China Open, she defeated CoCo Vandeweghe, Mona Barthel, Madison Keys, and Angelique Kerber before losing to Garbiñe Muguruza in the semifinals. Radwańska continued at the Tianjin Open, where she defeated Olga Savchuk, Wang Qiang, Elizaveta Kulichkova, Karolína Plíšková and Danka Kovinic to win her second title of the year and 16th of her career. With this win she also secured a spot in the WTA Finals in Singapore, making it her fifth straight year in the year-end WTA competition.

At the WTA Finals, Radwańska was drawn into the Red Group alongside Simona Halep, Maria Sharapova and Flavia Pennetta. She lost her first round robin match to Maria Sharapova in three sets. Following her loss to Pennetta, Radwańska battled past Simona Halep in their last round robin match ensuring the Romanian was eliminated. As a result, Radwańska advanced to the semifinals where she defeated Garbiñe Muguruza in three sets to make her first appearance in the final. She defeated Petra Kvitová in three sets and claimed her first WTA Finals title. She became the fourth player since the re-introduction of the round robin format in 2003 to advance to the final after losing two matches, and the first to win the title. This was the biggest title of her career to date. Radwańska ended the year ranked world No. 5.

During 2015, Radwańska won the WTA accolade for WTA Match of the Year (WTA Finals semifinal match against Garbiñe Muguruza), Best Dressed (On-Court, Rogers Cup), Shot of the Month on four occasions, won WTA Shot of the Year for the third year in a row (WTA Finals Championship match against Petra Kvitová), and, for the fifth consecutive season, won the WTA Award for Fan Favorite Player.

=== 2016: Back to no. 2 and 20th WTA title ===
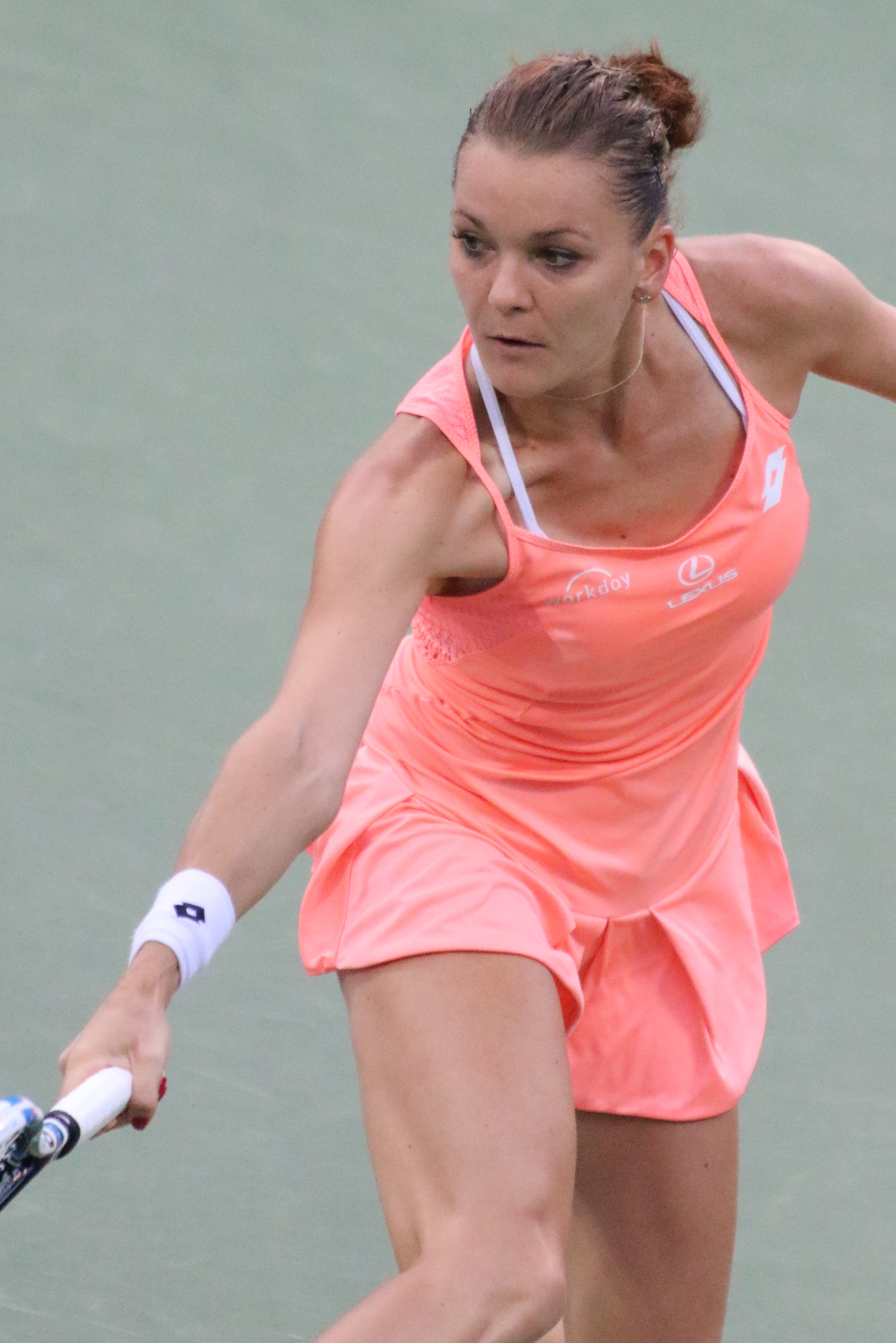
Radwańska at the 2016 US Open

Radwańska began her season at the Shenzhen Open, where she defeated Aleksandra Krunić, Zhang Shuai, Wang Qiang, Anna-Lena Friedsam and Alison Riske (all in straight sets), to win her 18th WTA Title. As a result of her performance she was able to move to fourth in the world rankings. At the Australian Open, Radwańska advanced to the semifinals, losing to Serena Williams. Next, she played at the Qatar Open in Doha, where she defeated Kateryna Bondarenko, Monica Niculescu and Roberta Vinci to reach her fifth semifinal at the tournament. She lost to Carla Suárez Navarro in two sets, but moved up to world No. 3. In the Indian Wells Open, she defeated Dominika Cibulková, Monica Niculescu, Jelena Janković and Petra Kvitová. In doing so, she regained her world No. 2 status. She lost a tight match with a second-set tiebreaker to Serena Williams in the semifinals. At the Miami Open she defeated Alizé Cornet and Madison Brengle before losing to Timea Bacsinszky in the fourth round.

At her first tournament of the clay season, the Porsche Tennis Grand Prix, top-seeded Radwańska defeated Andrea Petkovic and Karolína Plíšková for the seventh and sixth time respectively. In the semifinal she lost to German qualifier Laura Siegemund who upset Simona Halep and Roberta Vinci on her way to the final. Serena Williams' withdrawal from the Madrid Open elevated Radwańska to top seed of the tournament. She lost to Dominika Cibulková in the first round. At Roland Garros, second-seeded Radwańska defeated Bojana Jovanovski, Caroline Garcia and Barbora Strýcová before losing to Tsvetana Pironkova. Radwańska's fourth-round match against Pironkova was contested over three days due to harsh rainy conditions. Radwańska led the encounter prior to the resumption of the match in the rain. However while playing in the rain she dropped ten consecutive games, got treatment from a trainer on her hand and subsequently ended up losing the match in three sets. While avoiding major injury during the match, Radwańska needed treatment to her hand the following day.

Radwańska was awarded a wildcard entry into the Birmingham Classic, which opened the grass-court season. She lost to CoCo Vandeweghe in the opening match. Prior to Wimbledon, Radwańska competed in another grass tournament at Eastbourne International. She beat Eugenie Bouchard to reach her first quarterfinal on grass courts this season. At Wimbledon Radwańska was seeded third. She defeated Kateryna Kozlova in the first round, followed by a three-set thriller against Ana Konjuh and then comfortably beating Kateřina Siniaková in the third round. No. 3 seed Radwańska, who was considered to be the top competition for Serena Williams since Garbiñe Muguruza was eliminated in the second round, was upset herself in the round of 16. Radwańska found herself on the losing end of a tight three-set match against Dominika Cibulková, which lasted almost three hours.

At the start of the US Open Series, Radwańska pulled out of the Bank of the West Classic due to an injured right hand. She caught an injury to her right hand during the marathon third set in the fourth round of the Wimbledon Championships against Cibulková. "Unfortunately the right hand injury I suffered at Wimbledon is not 100 percent (fine) and my medical team has advised me to rest", said Radwańska. She, however, was able to get back in shape before Rogers Cup in Montreal. At Rogers Cup, she defeated Monica Niculescu in straight sets before losing to Anastasia Pavlyuchenkova in the third round.

In August Radwańska participated in her third Olympics at the 2016 Summer Olympics in Rio de Janeiro. After 55 hours of travel time to get to Rio from Montreal she lost in the first round match to Saisai Zheng. Partnered with the 2014 Australian Open men's doubles winner, Łukasz Kubot she also lost a tight first round mixed doubles match to the Romanian pair of Irina Camelia Begu and Horia Tecău.

Next Radwańska competed at the Cincinnati Open where she battled her way past Johanna Konta to clinch the last nine games of the match to move into the quarterfinals. She lost to last year's Cincinnati runner-up Simona Halep. Following Cincinnati Radwańska was awarded a wild card entry into the Connecticut Open in New Haven. It was her fourth event in five weeks. Top-seeded Radwańska defeated Jeļena Ostapenko, Kirsten Flipkens and two-time defending champion Petra Kvitová to move into the final. In the final, she beat Elina Svitolina in straight sets to win her first ever Connecticut Open title and the 19th title of her career. Additionally, with her win in New Haven she earned enough points to clinch 1st place in the U.S. Open Series bonus challenge and a chance for up to an extra $1 million, depending on her finish in New York. Seeded fourth at the US Open Radwańska defeated Jessica Pegula, Naomi Broady and Caroline Garcia, all in straight sets to make it to the second week of the tournament. She lost to 18-year-old Ana Konjuh in the fourth round.

Radwańska started the Asian leg of the WTA calendar with the Pan Pacific Open tournament in Tokyo. As defending champion and seeded No. 2 she defeated Barbora Strýcová and Monica Puig to reach her 5th Tokyo semifinal. During her quarterfinal post match conference Radwańska stated that she felt "a little like John Isner today" while serving eight aces in overpowering Olympic gold medalist Monica Puig. In the semifinal she lost a tight three set match to Caroline Wozniacki. At Wuhan Open third-seeded Radwańska defeated Ekaterina Makarova to set up a rematch with Caroline Wozniacki. Following a two set win over Caroline Wozniacki, Radwańska lost a tight tree set quarterfinal match against Svetlana Kuznetsova. Radwańska continued at the China Open, the fourth and last Premier Mandatory stop of the season. Without dropping a set she defeated Wang Qiang, Ekaterina Makarova, Caroline Wozniacki, Yaroslava Shvedova, Elina Svitolina and Johanna Konta to win her second China Open title and the 20th title of her career. The 2016 China Open is Radwańska's third Premier Mandatory title. She is just the fourth player to own three or more Premier Mandatory trophies, along with Serena Williams, Victoria Azarenka, and Maria Sharapova. Radwańska next played at Tianjin Open. She beat Tatjana Maria and Evgeniya Rodina in straight sets, but withdrew from her QF match with right-thigh injury.

Following her win over Ekaterina Makarova at the China Open reigning WTA Finals champion, Radwańska qualified for the 2016 WTA Finals in Singapore. She returned to Singapore for the sixth consecutive year, the longest active streak on the tour. At the WTA Finals Radwańska was drawn into the White Group alongside Karolína Plíšková, Garbiñe Muguruza and Svetlana Kuznetsova. In her opening match she lost to Kuznetsova despite having a match point in the third set. In her second and third round robin matches Radwańska defeated Garbiñe Muguruza and Karolína Plíšková, both in straight sets. She advanced to her 4th WTA Championships semifinal, where she lost to world No. 1, Angelique Kerber. For the first time in her career Radwańska ended the season ranked world No. 3.

For the fourth year in a row, Radwańska was voted the winner of WTA Shot of the Year. She took top honors with her hot shot against Monica Niculescu at the Indian Wells Masters Tournament. Additionally, her performance in a close match against Dominika Cibulková at Wimbledon won her the Grand Slam Match of the Year award. Radwańska also won the WTA Award for Fan Favorite Player.

=== 2017: Foot injury and out of top 20 ===
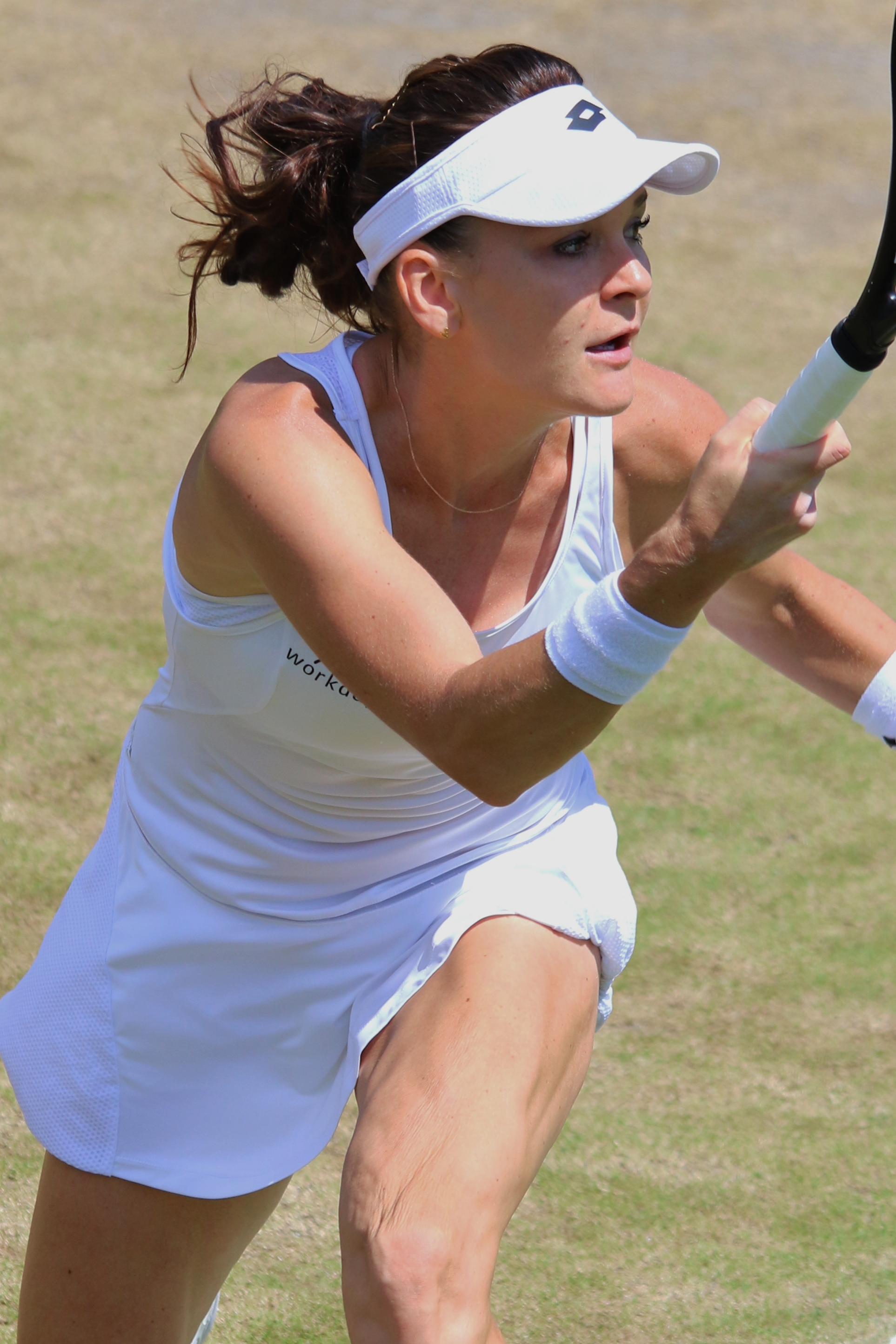
Radwańska at the 2017 Wimbledon Championship

During the off season, Radwańska switched her racquet make from Babolat to Srixon. She began the year at the Shenzhen Open as the top seed and defending champion, where she reached the quarterfinal before losing to Alison Riske. The following week, she reached the final at Sydney International defeating Christina McHale, Duan Yingying, and Barbora Strýcová before losing to Johanna Konta. Seeded third at the Australian Open she defeated Tsvetana Pironkova. In the second round she lost to the eventual semifinalist Mirjana Lučić-Baroni. Following a second round loss to Caroline Wozniacki at the Qatar Open, Radwańska competed at the Dubai Tennis Championships. As the fourth seed, she received a bye into the second round where she defeated Belgian qualifier Elise Mertens in straight sets. She lost to Catherine Bellis in the third round.

In March, Radwańska celebrated her 28th birthday as she prepared for the Indian Wells Open. At the Indian Wells Tennis Garden, she defeated Sara Sorribes Tormo before losing to Peng Shuai in the third round. Next she competed in the Miami Open, where she defeated Wang Qiang in straight sets for a rematch with the Australian Open semifinalist Mirjana Lučić-Baroni. Lučić-Baroni defeated Radwańska for a second time in 2017, this time for the loss of just three games.

In April, Radwańska began her clay season at the Porsche Tennis Grand Prix as the 7th seed. She lost in straight sets to Ekaterina Makarova in the first round. She later withdrew from her forthcoming tournaments in Madrid and Rome, citing a foot injury. At the French Open Radwańska was seeded at No.9. In her first match after being sidelined for five weeks due to a right foot injury she eased past Fiona Ferro in straight sets in just over an hour. In the second round she defeated Belgium's Alison Van Uytvanck to face Alizé Cornet in the third round. Radwańska had won seven of their eight previous matches, including the only one on clay – at the French Open nine years ago – but this time lost to Cornet in two sets. Radwańska withdrew from the Ricoh Open and Birmingham Classic due to a viral illness. She came into the Eastbourne International as the No. 9 seed but fell to Lauren Davis. Radwańska then started her Wimbledon Championships campaign where she defeated Jelena Janković, Christina McHale and Timea Bacsinszky before falling to Svetlana Kuznetsova in the fourth round.

Radwańska began her summer hard-court season at the Rogers Cup in Toronto, Canada, where she defeated CoCo Vandeweghe and Tímea Babos before falling to Caroline Wozniacki in the third round. As the defending champion and top seed at the Connecticut Open she defeated Eugenie Bouchard and Peng Shuai before losing to Daria Gavrilova in her second semifinal of the season. This result saw her fall out of the top 10 for the first time since 2015. Following New Haven Open Radwańska entered US Open, where she was seeded 10th. She defeated Petra Martić and Yulia Putintseva in straight sets to advance to the third round. In the third round she lost a tight 3-hour/3 set match to CoCo Vandeweghe.

Radwańska was forced out of the Pan Pacific Open tournament in Tokyo due to a bout of flu. At the Wuhan Open, she scored her fifth career win over Wimbledon semifinalist Magdaléna Rybáriková in the first round. She defeated Julia Görges in the second round, claiming her 500th main draw victory on the WTA. Radwańska avenged her straight-set loss to Görges earlier this year, at the Western & Southern Open in Cincinnati, and increased her head-to-head record against the German to four wins and two losses. A quarterfinalist in Wuhan last year, Radwańska lost to the eventual finalist, Ashleigh Barty in the third round, after the Australian dispatched No. 5 seed Johanna Konta. Radwańska began her title defense at the China Open with two straight-sets victories over Carina Witthöft and Zhang Shuai before falling to Daria Kasatkina in a third-round three set meeting. Radwańska ended her season ranked 28th, her worst since 2005, following a second round defeat in Hong Kong to Samantha Stosur.

At the end of the season Radwańska won the 2017 Shot of the Year for the fifth time in a row. She turned defense to offense in a stunning way to thwart a would-be winner from Julia Görges during their match at Wuhan Open.

=== 2018: Retirement ===
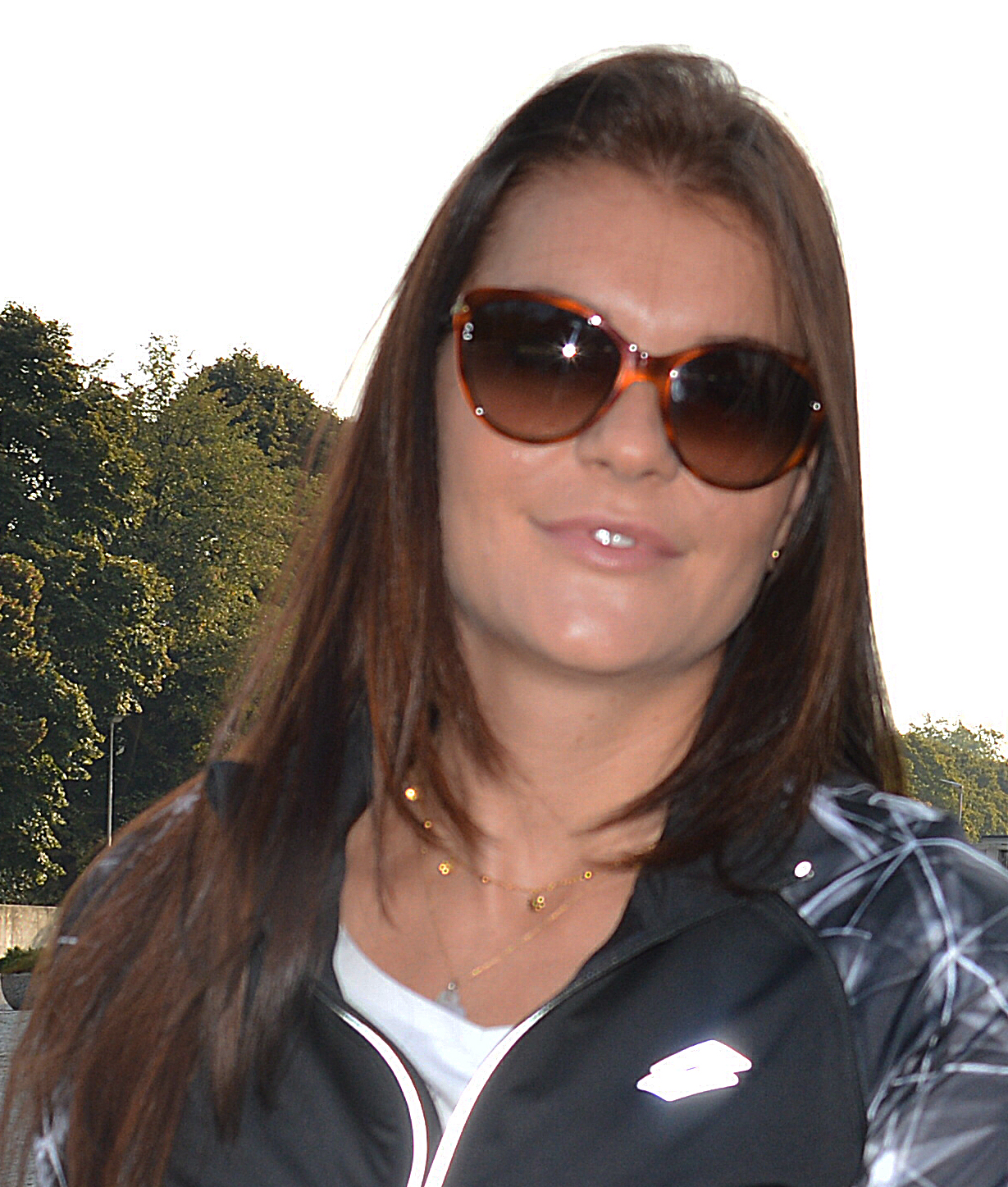
Radwańska in 2018

Radwańska began the year at the Auckland Open where as the fourth seed, she defeated Beatriz Haddad Maia and Taylor Townsend but lost to qualifier Sachia Vickery in the quarterfinal. She then competed at the Sydney International, overpowering the defending champion Johanna Konta and Catherine Bellis to advance to the quarterfinal, where she lost to Camila Giorgi. This loss caused Radwańska to fall out of the top 30 for the first time since 2007 since she was unable to defend her finalist points at the tournament. Radwańska was seeded 26th at the Australian Open. She reached the third round, after defeating Kristýna Plíšková and Lesia Tsurenko, but lost to Hsieh Su-wei, who beat Garbiñe Muguruza in the second round. Radwańska made it three three-set victories in a row over Mona Barthel to make a winning start to her Qatar Open campaign. She ultimately needed 10 match points, but avoided the tiebreak and finally closed out the match after two hours and 26 minutes. "I’d rather not talk about those ten match points!" Radwańska joked. "The important thing is I won the tenth one". In the second round, Radwańska lost to the eventual champion Petra Kvitová in three sets.

At Dubai, Radwańska lost to eventual finalist Daria Kasatkina in the opening round. Her next tournament was the Indian Wells Open where she received a bye into the second round. There, she lost to the eventual champion Naomi Osaka, who defeated unseeded Maria Sharapova in her opening match. At the Miami Open, Radwańska made a promising start, defeating world No. 1, Simona Halep, in three sets. This victory marked Radwańska's second career win over a world No. 1, and the first since 2012. She extended her great record in Miami, too; reaching the round of 16 or better in ten of her 12 appearances. Radwańska ended her run in Miami with a loss to Victoria Azarenka in the fourth round. After Miami, she was promoted from 32nd to 30th in the WTA ranking. Radwańska opened her clay-court season in Istanbul where she retired in the first-round match to Donna Vekić. It was later revealed that Radwańska hurt her back the day before during a training session. Subsequently, she withdrew from the Mutua Madrid Open and French Open due to a back injury. Radwańska made a winning return from injury against Tímea Babos in the first round of the Nature Valley International. Despite missing a Grand Slam event for the first time in over a decade, dating back to the 2006 French Open, the former world No. 2 looked as though she'd never left over the course of 66 minutes on the Eastbourne lawns. Radwańska, unseeded in Eastbourne, defeated No. 15 seed Daria Gavrilova to face Petra Kvitová in the third round. Since Petra Kvitová withdrew with a hamstring injury Radwańska automatically advanced to the quarterfinal where she defeated Jeļena Ostapenko to reach the semifinal. In the semifinal, she lost to Aryna Sabalenka in three sets.

At Wimbledon, she defeated Elena-Gabriela Ruse in a close three-set match, saving six match points and reeling off the last three games in a row to book her place in the second round. In the 2nd round she played Lucie Šafářová, to whom she lost in straight sets. For the first time in her career Radwańska lost to Karolína Plíšková in the first round of the 2018 Western & Southern Open, bringing their head-to-head to 7–1 against the Czech. Next she played at the Connecticut Open where she lost to Petra Kvitová in the opening round. For the first time in over a decade, Radwańska came into a Grand Slam main draw outside the top 32 seeds. Unseeded at the US Open, she lost to Tatjana Maria, in the first round. Radwańska progressed to the second round of the Korea Open thanks to a two set victory over Bethanie Mattek-Sands. In a clash of two former winners of the Korea Open, 2013 champion Radwańska lost to the 2015 champion Irina-Camelia Begu in the second round.

Due to her ongoing struggles with injuries Radwańska withdrew from the China Open tournament, thus ending the season early with a 14–14 singles record. By the end of the season, Radwańska fell to the 78th position in the ranking – the lowest since 2006, when she made her debut in the WTA series. On 14 November 2018, Radwańska announced her retirement from professional tennis. "Taking into consideration my health and the heavy burdens of professional tennis, I have to concede that I’m not able to push my body to the limits required," she wrote on her Facebook account.

== Fed Cup participation ==
Radwańska participated in the Fed Cup from 2006 to the present. She played a total of 48 Fed Cup matches with 41 wins and 7 losses. For her achievements she was presented with two Fed Cup Heart Awards. "I think it's great to play Fed Cup", said Radwańska, "I’ve been playing for the last couple of years and I really think it helped my team to go up and, you know, I’m very happy about it and I’m always ready to play".

As member of the Poland Fed Cup team Radwańska participated in 2014 Fed Cup World Group play-offs. In Barcelona she led Poland to a 3–2 win over Spain, which allowed Poland to advance to 2015 Fed Cup World Group for the first time in over twenty years.

== Rivalries ==
=== Radwańska vs. Wozniacki ===
In over a decade of meetings, Radwańska and Caroline Wozniacki had a rivalry that ended 11–6 in Wozniacki's favour. Radwańska first scored a win against Wozniacki in July 2007 at the Nordic Light Open in Stockholm. She also defeated Wozniacki at the Sydney International, Pan Pacific Open in Tokyo, and tournaments in Doha, Wuhan and Beijing. In August 2017 they faced each other for the last time at the Rogers Cup in Toronto, where Wozniacki beat Radwańska to advance to the quarter-finals.

=== Radwańska vs. Zvonareva ===
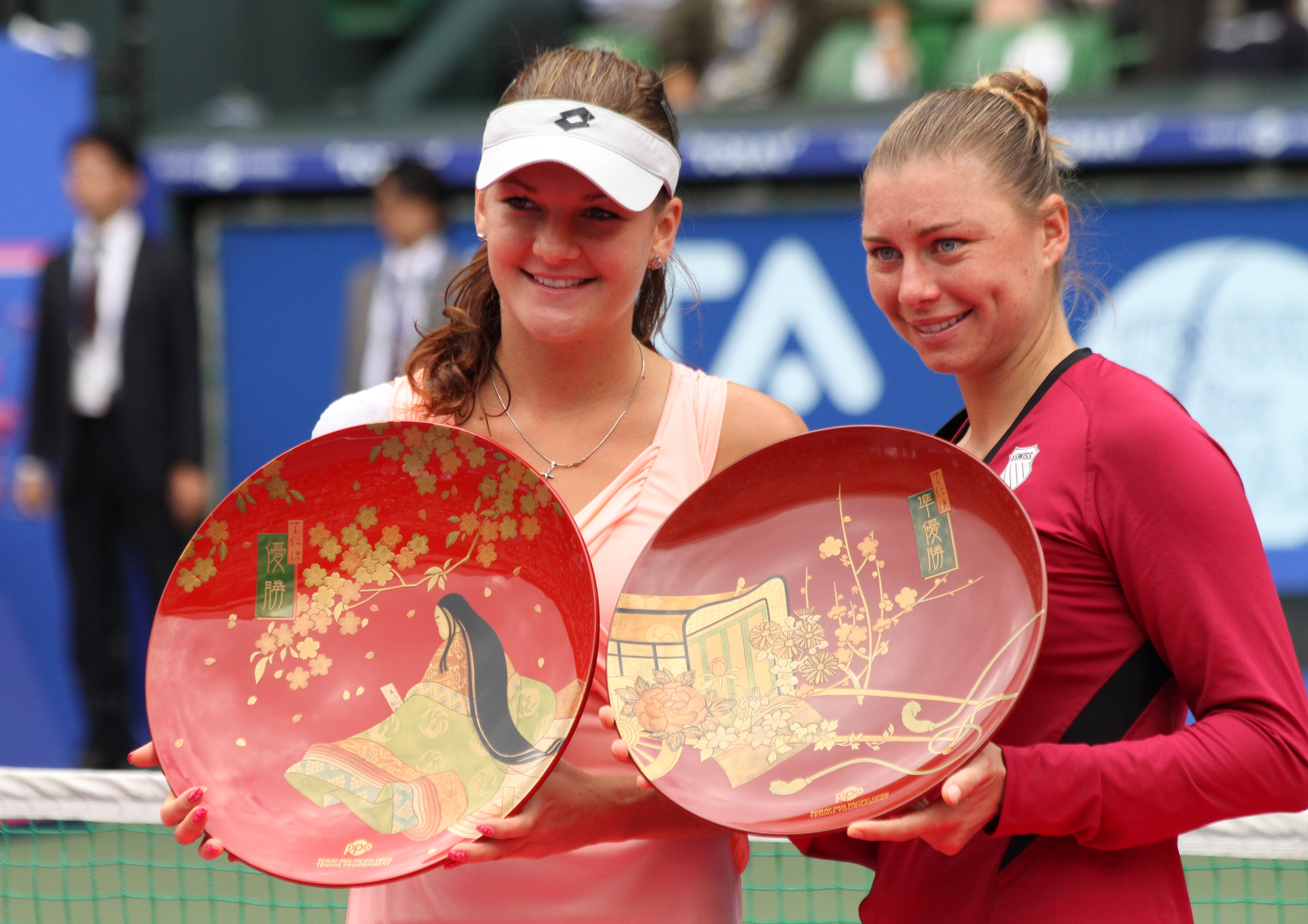
Radwańska and Zvonareva after the 2011 Pan Pacific Open final

Radwańska had a rivalry with Russian player Vera Zvonareva, which began in 2007. It ended 4–2 in Radwańska's favour.

Throughout their meetings, Radwańska proved able to match Zvonareva's pace and movements around the court. Zvonareva was considered the more powerful of the two, while Radwańska was noted as more focused at times, utilizing what Sports Illustrated's Courtney Nguyen dubbed "selective aggression" during the pair's 2011 matches.

Their first match occurred during the 2007 Kremlin Cup, with Zvonareva winning in straight sets. The two did not play again until the 2011 season, when Radwańska won four of their five matches, including the finals of the Mercury Insurance Open and the Pan Pacific Open. Their final meeting of 2011 was an acclaimed match at the WTA Championships. Trailing 3–5 in the third set, Radwańska saved three match points and went on to win in three sets. The victory marked her fourth straight win against Zvonareva, whom she described as "very consistent and always tough to beat."

=== Radwańska vs. Li ===
Radwańska and Li Na first played in 2009. Li led the series 6–5. Radwańska won the three of their four matches on grass and their only meeting on clay. Li led the rivalry 5–1 on hard courts. Their matches included a victory each at Wimbledon: Radwańska winning in 2009 and Li in 2010. In 2012, Radwańska and Li met four times, with Li taking three victories. Li lost their meeting in the Stuttgart quarter-final in three sets, but dominated in Montréal, Cincinnati and Beijing. In 2013, both were undefeated that year when they met each other in the semi-finals at Sydney. Radwańska beat Li and eventually won the tournament. At the 2013 Australian Open, Li became the first player to defeat Radwańska that season, with a victory in the quarter-finals. Their last meeting came at Wimbledon that year, in the quarter-finals, with Radwańska winning in three sets.

=== Radwańska vs. Ivanovic ===
Radwańska and Ana Ivanovic had their first professional meeting in 2006. With Ana Ivanović having retired, Radwańska ended the series 7–3 ahead. The majority of their matches were played on hard courts. Radwańska lead their match-ups on clay.

=== Radwańska vs. Kerber ===
Radwańska versus Angelique Kerber has been described as one of the closest rivalries in women's tennis. The rivalry stretches back to their first meeting in 2008 Qatar Telecom German Open. Radwańska and Kerber were tied after winning 6 matches each. The players have played one match each on grass and clay, with Radwańska winning both. Kerber leads their head-to-head on hard courts 5–4. Their first meeting in 2015 at Bank of the West Classic took place at night, with Kerber winning in three sets.

=== Radwańska vs. Kuznetsova ===
Radwańska and Svetlana Kuznetsova played each other eighteen times since 2007, with Radwańska trailing the head-to-head 4–14. Their first meeting was at Wimbledon in 2007 with Radwańska losing in straight sets. She lost their first three meetings, but in the four meetings that eventuated in 2008, she would win three of them, including in the third round of the Australian Open and in the fourth round of Wimbledon. Additionally, she also defeated her at the year-end championships later in the year after replacing an injured Ana Ivanovic during the round robin stage. Radwańska would later struggle in the rivalry, at one point losing six meetings in a row, including an upset loss at the 2012 French Open, before ending this losing streak at the 2014 Mutua Madrid Open, saving three match points in the process. Radwańska also lost to Kuznetsova in the two finals in which they met, first at Beijing in 2009 and then at San Diego in 2010. In 2015, Radwańska lost to Kuznetsova again in the opening match of Fed Cup tie between Russia and Poland. Their most recent meeting at the 2016 Wuhan Open saw Radwańska lose a three-set, quarter-final thriller after holding a match point in the second set. They met for the 17th time at the WTA Finals in Singapore, with Radwańska again wasting a match point in a three-set loss. Their most recent meeting, at the 2017 Wimbledon Championships, saw Radwańska lose in straight sets, a decade on from their first meeting.

== Playing style and equipment ==
Radwańska's game was founded on variety, mobility, and a tendency to anticipate her opponent's actions. She often used clever shot placement to construct rallies—either opening the court up for a winner, or prompting a surprised opponent to hit a misplaced return. Her primary weapons included a mixture of slices and lobs, along with her ability to hit the ball at a variety of angles.

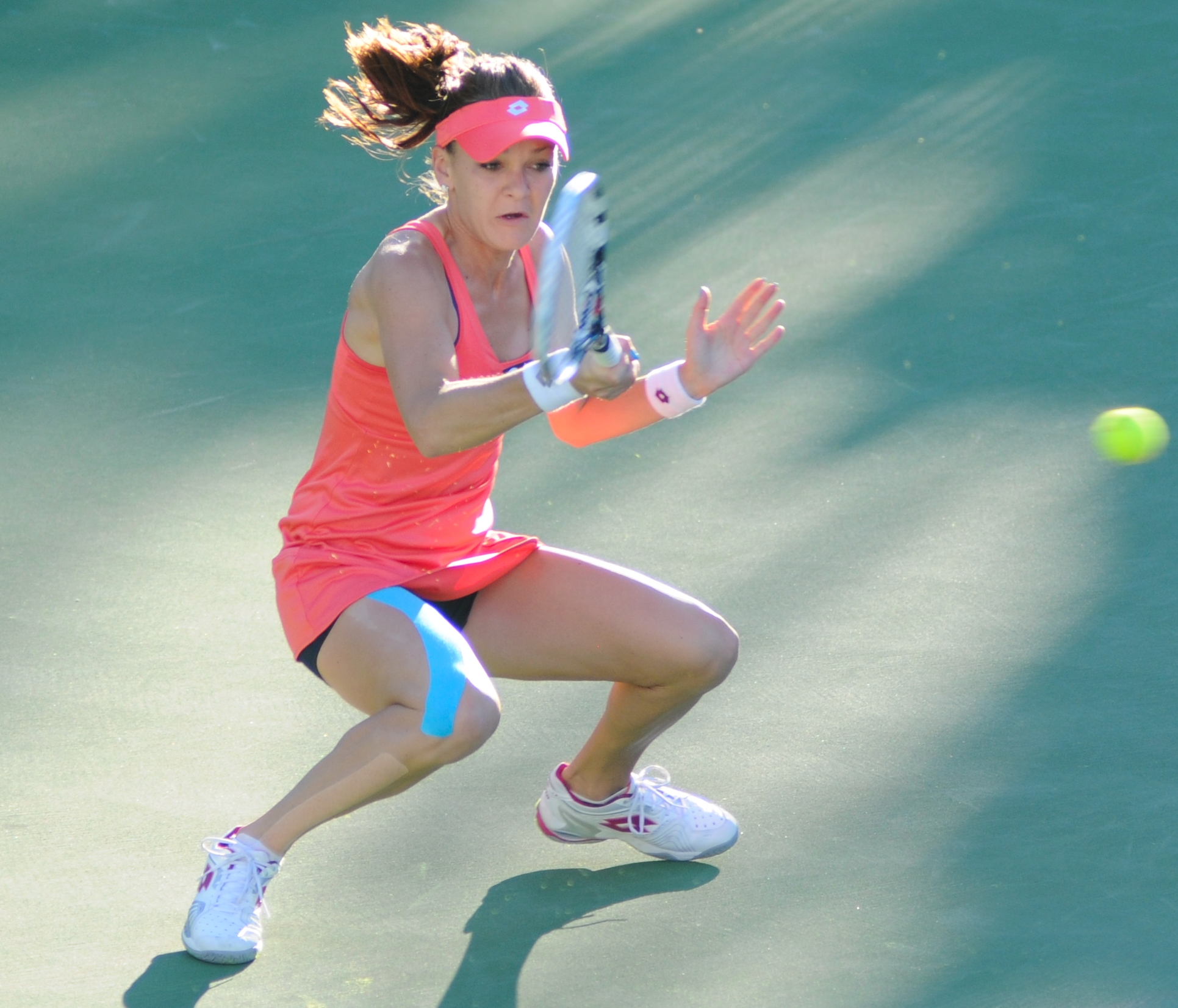
Radwańska hitting a crouching forehand

"In the years since I first joined the WTA Tour, people have called me 'Ninja' or 'The Professor,' and that's the greatest compliment because I want to make those shots that make people ask, 'How did she do that?'"

— Radwańska in 2016

In 2012, Tom Perrotta of The Wall Street Journal called Radwańska "the most tactically sound, subtle tennis player in the world." Over the years she was given the nicknames "The Magician", "Ninja" and "The Professor", due to the fact that she can pull off the most difficult shots in the game with ease. She also makes use of a disguised drop shot, often swung with the same motion as a normal stroke during a rally. She is also noted for her crouching shots, during which she quickly drops in place to return or redirect a low ball, along with her use of an overhead backhand while on defense. In fact, she is known for having invented her distinctive squat position shot, where she sits so low on her haunches that she can play half-volleys with a horizontal racket. "I’m not sure if I invented it", says Radwańska, "but I was definitely one of the first ones. When I watch TV, I can hear commentators say that was my shot, even if someone else is playing, so it's nice to hear I can put something new into tennis".

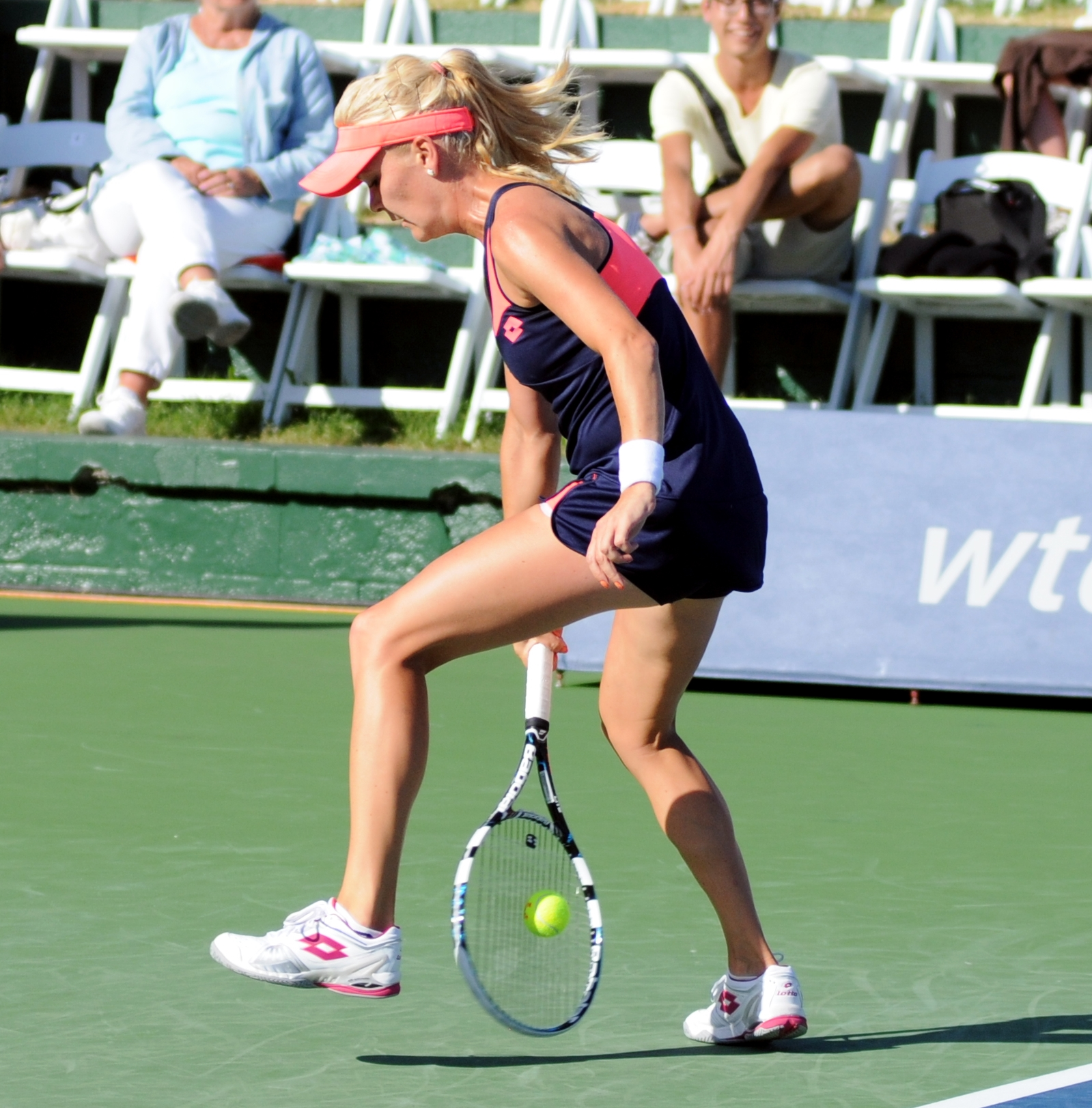
Radwańska hitting a tweener shot

One of Radwańska's main weaknesses is her lack of power in her serve. Her serve, especially her second serve, is generally slow and vulnerable to attack. Her shots sometimes lack penetration on court, posing little threat to power hitters. "I don't think I can ever serve 200 kilometers per hour, it's just not my body," Radwańska said. "I have to do something else. I was just born to play like this. I have so many ideas. In your mind it's like, 'OK, I go down the line, then crosscourt, maybe drop shot.' But you have just one second, or even not one second, it just has to be automatic." Radwańska merely exhales when she strikes the ball, rather than loudly grunting like many of her peers. She bounces the ball no more than four times before serving. She says she can play with any racket and likes to use one for an entire match, unlike most players, who routinely grab frames with fresh strings.

Tennis commentators, including former pro Wojciech Fibak, have compared her playing style to that of Martina Hingis, with Fibak describing her as "a natural mover who understands the geometry of the court". Radwańska cited Hingis as an inspiration. She and Hingis had their lone tour meeting in 2007, with Radwańska winning in three sets.

Radwańska played with the Babolat Pure Drive Lite racquets until the end of the 2016 season. At the start of the 2017 season, beginning with the Shenzhen Open tournament, Radwańska started playing with a new tennis racket, made by the Japanese manufacturer, Srixon. Other tennis players who also use Srixon rackets include Kevin Anderson, Misaki Doi, Kurumi Nara, Zarina Diyas and Magda Linette. For her on court tennis apparel, Radwańska is currently sponsored by Lotto Sport Italia.

=== Coaches ===
Radwańska began her tennis career with her father, Robert Radwański, as her coach. She stated: "My dad was traveling with me all my life and we practiced together for 17 years, almost actually 18. So it's pretty long time."

In 2011, Radwańska began working with Fed Cup coach Tomasz Wiktorowski, who replaced her father. Borna Bikić, a veteran coach on the WTA Tour, briefly joined them in 2012.

Radwańska hired Martina Navratilova as part of her team at the conclusion of the 2014 season. In April 2015 they parted ways after Navratilova stated that she was too busy to continue in her part-time role as Radwańska's consulting coach.

== Charitable work ==
Since 2009, Radwańska and her sister Urszula have devoted time during the off-season to Szlachetna Paczka ("Noble Box"). The charity has its volunteers go door-to-door throughout the year compiling a database of families in need, asking them what would help ease the pressures of the holidays. Then, for a three-week period from mid-November to early December, donors are given a list to take with them to the supermarket, where they fill a shopping cart with the food, clothing and more to donate to them.

Additionally, she and Urszula offer their support to Habitat for Humanity and its project in Warsaw. As Habitat for Humanity ambassador Radwańska stated, "It's an honor to be a part of such a fantastic cause and be involved with Habitat for Humanity, helping underprivileged families across the world. I have great respect for all the volunteers and those working hard everyday against poverty housing."

On 23 July 2022 Radwańska participated in a charity tennis event in Kraków, Poland, organised by Iga Świątek to raise funds for children and teenagers impacted by the Russian invasion of Ukraine. The one-day event featured a mixed doubles exhibition match and a set of singles between Świątek and Radwańska. Świątek later announced on Twitter that the event has raised over 2,5 mln złoty (over €500,000), which would be spread between United 24, Elina Svitolina Foundation and UNICEF Poland.

== Career statistics ==
=== Grand Slam performance timelines ===
Key
W	F	SF	QF	#R	RR	Q#	DNQ	A	NH

(W) winner; (F) finalist; (SF) semifinalist; (QF) quarterfinalist; (#R) rounds 4, 3, 2, 1; (RR) round-robin stage; (Q#) qualification round; (DNQ) did not qualify; (A) absent; (NH) not held; (SR) strike rate (events won / competed); (W–L) win–loss record.

==== Singles ====
Tournament	2006	2007	2008	2009	2010	2011	2012	2013	2014	2015	2016	2017	2018	SR	W–L	Win %
Australian Open	A	2R	QF	1R	3R	QF	QF	QF	SF	4R	SF	2R	3R	0 / 12	35–12	74%
French Open	A	1R	4R	4R	2R	4R	3R	QF	3R	1R	4R	3R	A	0 / 11	23–11	68%
Wimbledon	4R	3R	QF	QF	4R	2R	F	SF	4R	SF	4R	4R	2R	0 / 13	43–13	77%
US Open	2R	4R	4R	2R	2R	2R	4R	4R	2R	3R	4R	3R	1R	0 / 13	24–13	65%
Win–loss	4–2	6–4	14–4	8–4	7–4	9–4	15–4	16–4	11–4	10–4	14–4	8–4	3–3	0 / 49	125–49	72%

==== Doubles ====
Tournament	2007	2008	2009	2010	2011	2012	SR	W–L
Australian Open	1R	1R	2R	SF	3R	3R	0 / 6	9–6
French Open	3R	1R	QF	QF	1R	2R	0 / 6	9–6
Wimbledon	3R	2R	1R	2R	3R	3R	0 / 6	8–6
US Open	2R	1R	1R	3R	SF	A	0 / 5	7–5
Win–loss	5–4	1–4	4–4	10–4	8–4	5–3	0 / 23	33–23

=== Grand Slam finals ===
==== Singles: 1 (runner-up) ====
Result	Year	Championship	Surface	Opponent	Score
Loss	2012	Wimbledon	Grass	(United States) Serena Williams	1–6, 7–5, 2–6

=== Year-end championships finals ===
==== Singles: 1 (title) ====
Result	Year	Tournament	Surface	Opponent	Score
Win	2015	WTA Finals, Singapore	Hard (i)	(Czech Republic) Petra Kvitová	6–2, 4–6, 6–3

== Awards ==
2006

- WTA Tour Most Impressive Newcomer of the Year

2011

- WTA Fan Favorite Singles Player

2012

- WTA Fan Favorite Singles Player
- WTA Fan Favorite Video
- WTA Fan Favorite Fanpage on Facebook

2013

- WTA Fan Favorite Singles Player
- WTA Fan Favorite Shot of the Year
- Gold Cross of Merit

2014

- Fed Cup Heart Award
- WTA Fan Favorite Singles Player
- WTA Fan Favorite Shot of the Year

2015

- Hopman Cup
- WTA Fan Favorite Shot of the Year
- WTA Fan Favorite Singles Player
- WTA Match of the Year
- WTA Best Dressed (On-Court)

2016

- Most Energetic Player of China Open
- US Open Series Champion
- WTA Fan Favorite Shot of the Year
- WTA Fan Favorite Singles Player
- WTA Grand Slam Match of the Year

2017

- WTA Fan Favorite Shot of the Year

2019

- Badge of Honor for Merit in the Protection of Children's Rights

== See also ==
- Poland Fed Cup team
- List of Poles

Sporting positions
Preceded by Karolína Plíšková	US Open Series Champion; 2016	Succeeded by Incumbent
Awards
Preceded by Sania Mirza	WTA Newcomer of the Year; 2006	Succeeded by Ágnes Szávay
Preceded by New Award	Fan Favorite Shot of the Year; 2013 – 2017	Succeeded by Simona Halep
Preceded by Maria Sharapova	WTA Fan Favorite Singles Player of the Year; 2011 – 2016	Succeeded by Simona Halep
Olympic Games
Preceded by Marek Twardowski	Flagbearer for Poland; 2012 London	Succeeded by Karol Bielecki
