= Sławomir Jan Piechota =

Polish politician (born 1960)

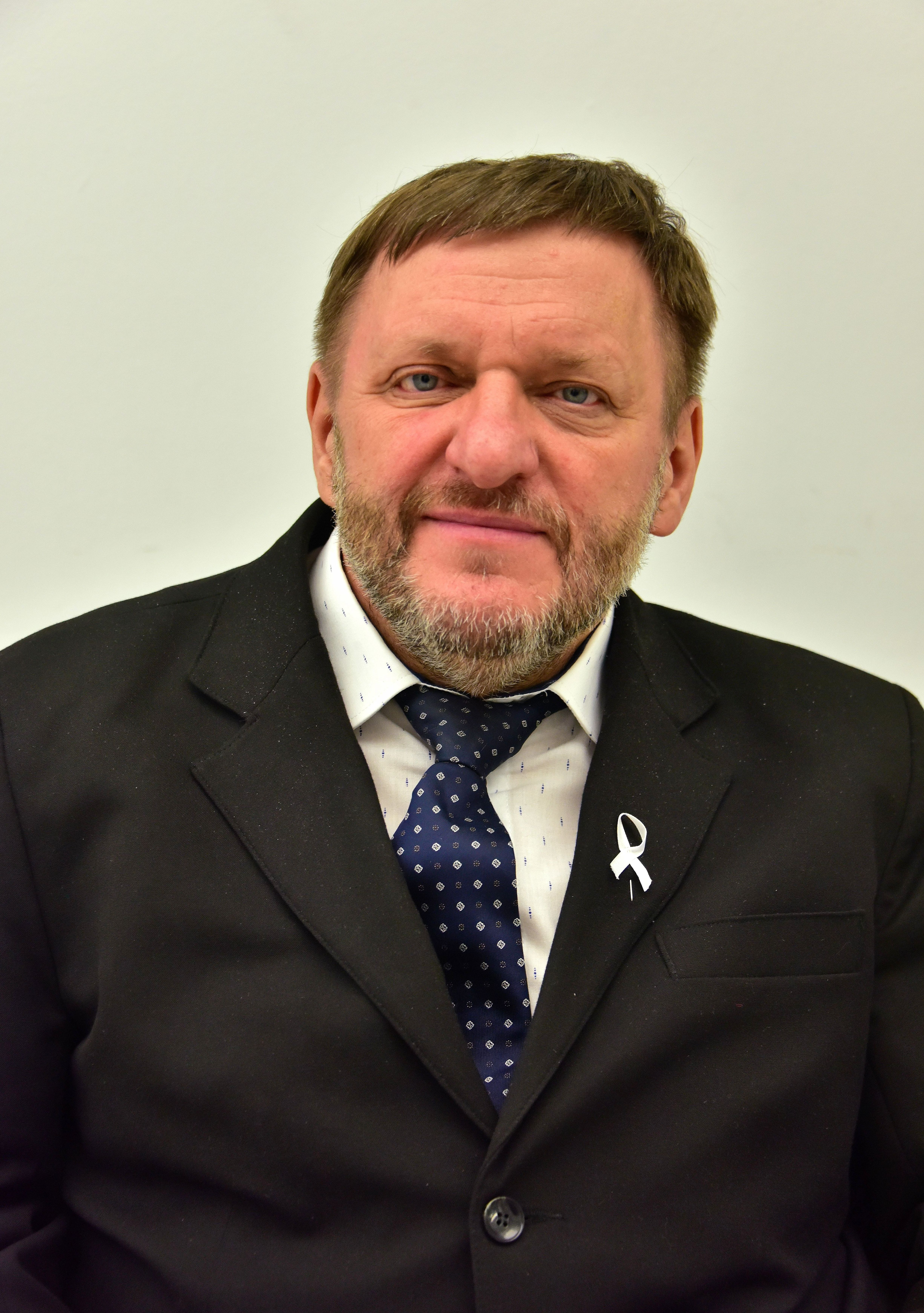
- Piechota in 2018

Member of the Sejm
- Incumbent
- Assumed office 25 September 2005
- Constituency: 3 – Wrocław

Personal details
- Born: 1 January 1960 (age 66) Tomaszów Mazowiecki, Polish People's Republic
- Party: Civic Platform

Sławomir Jan Piechota (born 1 January 1960 in Tomaszów Mazowiecki) is a Polish politician. He was elected to the Sejm on 25 September 2005, getting 7,281 votes in 3 Wrocław district as a candidate from the Civic Platform list.

== See also ==
- Members of Polish Sejm 2005-2007
