= Rep (fabric) =

Woven fabric with closely-spaced crosswise ribs

Rep, rip, repp, or reps is a cloth woven in fine cords or ribs across the width of a piece, usually made of silk, wool, or cotton. The name is said to have been adapted from the French reps, a word of unknown origin; it has also been suggested that it is a corruption of rib. In silk it is used for dresses, neckties, and to some extent, for ecclesiastical vestments. In wool and cotton it is used for various upholstery purposes.

== See also ==
- Repp tie
