= Kajetany =

- Village
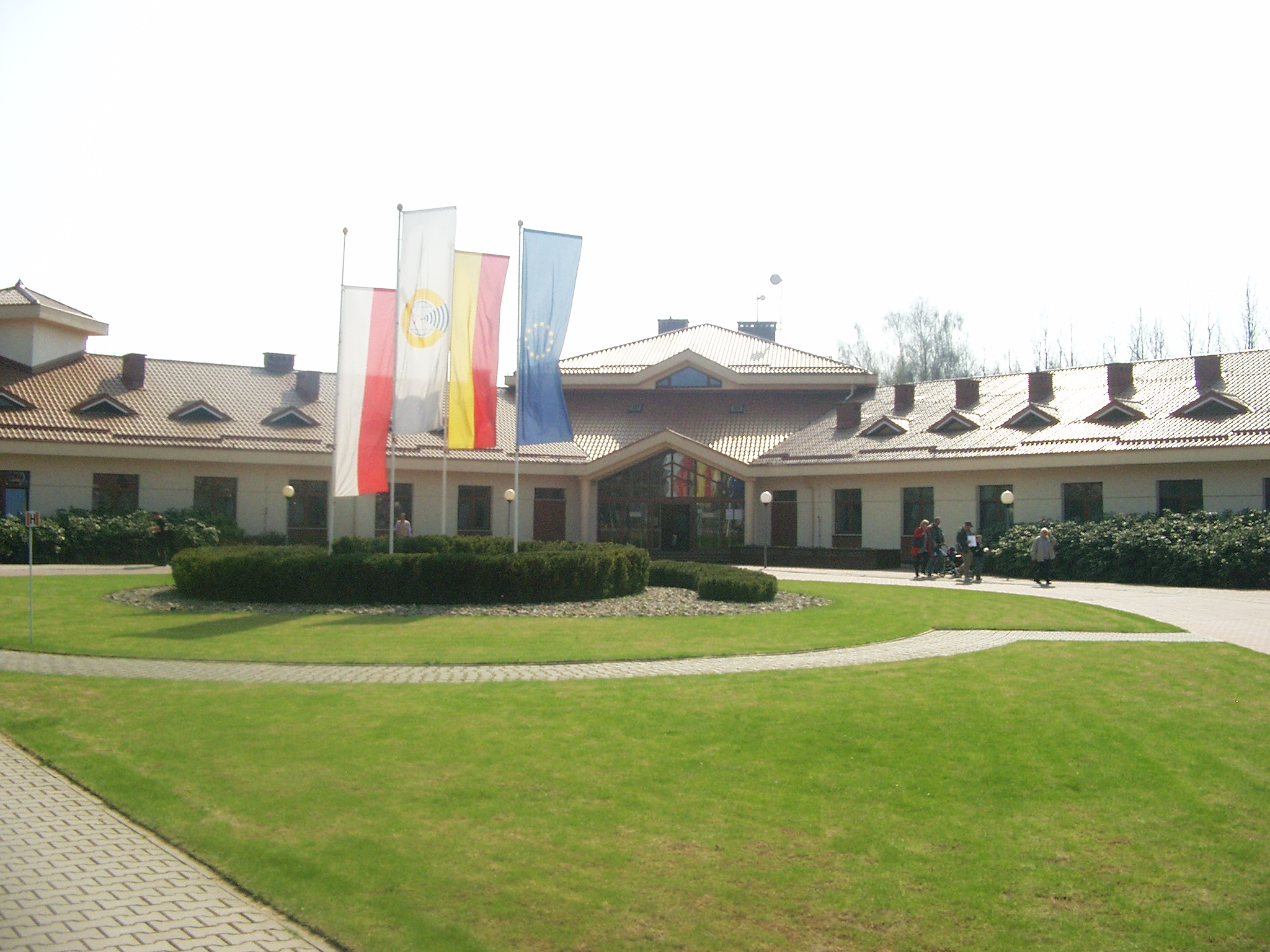
- World Hearing Center at Kajetany

- Location within Poland
- Coordinates: 52°05′32″N 20°48′52″E
- Country: Poland
- Voivodeship: Masovian
- County: Pruszków
- Gmina: Nadarzyn

Kajetany [kajɛˈtanɨ] is a village in the administrative district of Gmina Nadarzyn, within Pruszków County, Masovian Voivodeship, in east-central Poland.

== Notable places ==
Kajetany is home to the Institute of Sensory Organs. It designs, conducts and implements the research and scientific works in the scope of prophylaxis, diagnosis, treatment and rehabilitation related to sensory organ diseases.
