= 2016 WTA Finals =

- Date: October 23–30
- Edition: 46th (singles) / 41st (doubles)
- Category: WTA Finals
- Draw: 8S / 8D
- Surface: Hard (indoor)
- Location: Kallang, Singapore
- Venue: Singapore Indoor Stadium

Champions

Singles
- (Slovakia) Dominika Cibulková

Doubles
- (Russia) Ekaterina Makarova / (Russia) Elena Vesnina
- WTA Tour Championships

The 2016 WTA Finals was a women's tennis tournament at Kallang, Singapore. It was the 46th edition of the singles event and the 41st edition of the doubles competition. The tournament was contested by eight singles players and eight doubles teams. The tournament was contested by eight singles players and eight doubles teams. The tournament was the year-end final of the 2016 WTA Tour.

== Finals ==
=== Singles ===
- (Slovakia) Dominika Cibulková defeated (Germany) Angelique Kerber, 6–3, 6–4

=== Doubles ===
- (Russia) Ekaterina Makarova / (Russia) Elena Vesnina defeated (United States) Bethanie Mattek-Sands / (Czech Republic) Lucie Šafářová, 7–6^{(7–5)}, 6–3

== Tournament ==
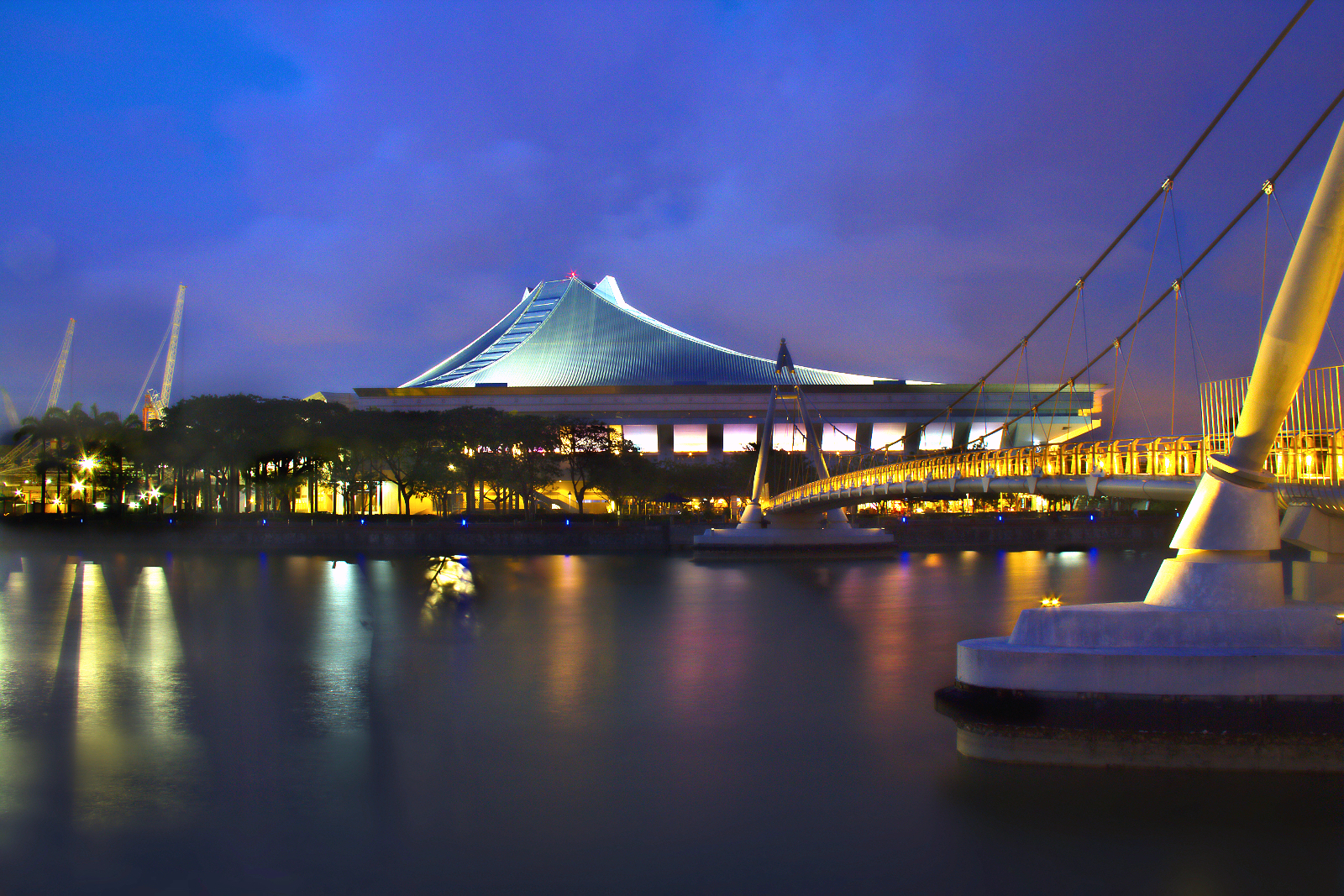
Singapore Indoor Stadium hosted the WTA Finals for the first time in 2014.

The 2016 WTA Finals took place at the Singapore Indoor Stadium the week of October 24, 2016, and was the 46th edition of the event. The tournament was run by the Women's Tennis Association (WTA) as part of the 2016 WTA Tour. Singapore was the ninth city to host the WTA Finals since its inauguration in 1972 and will host the event for at least five years. The event also held an exhibition tournament: the WTA Future Stars Under-14 and Under-16 tournaments.

=== Qualifying ===
In singles, point totals are calculated by combining point totals from sixteen tournaments. Of these sixteen tournaments, a player's results from the four Grand Slam events, the four Premier Mandatory tournaments, and the best results from two Premier 5 tournaments must be included.
In doubles, point totals are calculated by any combination of eleven tournaments throughout the year. Unlike in singles, this combination does not need to include results from the Grand Slams or Premier-level tournaments.

=== Format ===
The singles event features eight players in a round robin event, split into two groups of four. Over the first four days of competition, each player meets the other three players in her group, with the top two in each group advancing to the semifinals. The first-placed player in one group meets the second-placed player in the other group, and vice versa. The winners of each semifinal meet in the championship match. The doubles event returns to a single elimination event. The winners of each quarterfinal match will advance to the semifinals and the winners of each semifinal match will advance to the final.

==== Round robin tie-breaking methods ====
The final standings of each group were determined by the first of the following methods that applied:

1. Greatest number of wins.
2. Greatest number of matches played.
3. Head-to-head results if only two players are tied, or if three players are tied then:

a. If three players each have the same number of wins, a player having played less than all three matches is automatically eliminated and the player advancing to the single elimination competition is the winner of the match-up of the two remaining tied players.
b. Highest percentage of sets won.
c. Highest percentage of games won.

== Prize money and points ==
The total prize money for the BNP Paribas 2016 WTA Finals was US$7,000,000.

Singles
Stage	Prize money	Points
Champion	RR^{1} + $1,750,000	RR + 750
Runner-up	RR + $590,000	RR + 330
Semifinalist	RR + $40,000	RR
Round robin win per match	+$153,000	+250
Round robin loss per match	—N/a	+125
Participation Fee	3 matches = $151,000; 2 matches = $130,000; 1 match = $110,000	—N/a
Alternates	2 matches = $109,000; 1 match = $89,000; 0 matches = $68,000	—N/a
^{1} RR means prize money or points won in the round robin round.

Doubles
Stage	Prize money	Points
Champions	$500,000	1500
Runners-up	$260,000	1080
Semifinalists	$157,500	750
Quarterfinalists	$81,250	375
Prize Money per team

=== Qualifying ===
In singles, WTA rankings point totals are calculated by combining point totals from sixteen tournaments. Of these sixteen tournaments, a player's results from the four Grand Slam events, the four Premier Mandatory tournaments, and the best results from two Premier 5 tournaments must be included.

In doubles, point totals are calculated by any combination of eleven tournaments throughout the year. Unlike in singles, this combination does not need to include results from the Grand Slams or Premier-level tournaments.

== Qualified players ==
=== Singles ===
#	Players	Points	Tourn	Date Qualified
1	Angelique Kerber (GER)	8,000	20	22 August
inj	Serena Williams (USA)	7,050	7	22 August
2	Agnieszka Radwańska (POL)	4,975	19	4 October
3	Simona Halep (ROU)	4,728	17	29 September
4	Karolína Plíšková (CZE)	4,100	21	4 October
5	Garbiñe Muguruza (ESP)	3,736	19	14 October
6	Madison Keys (USA)	3,637	15	16 October
7	Dominika Cibulková (SVK)	3,625	21	16 October
8	Svetlana Kuznetsova (RUS)	3,490	20	22 October

On 22 August, Serena Williams and Angelique Kerber became the first two qualifiers.

Angelique Kerber started her season in Brisbane, where she lost to Victoria Azarenka in the final. At the Australian Open, Kerber was down match point to Misaki Doi in the first round but came back to win the match. Having previously never been past the fourth round in Melbourne, Kerber cruised past her next three opponents before avenging her Brisbane loss to Azarenka in the quarterfinals. In the semifinals, Kerber beat surprise semifinalist Johanna Konta in straight sets to reach her first ever Grand Slam final. In the final she stunned Serena Williams to win her maiden Grand Slam title.

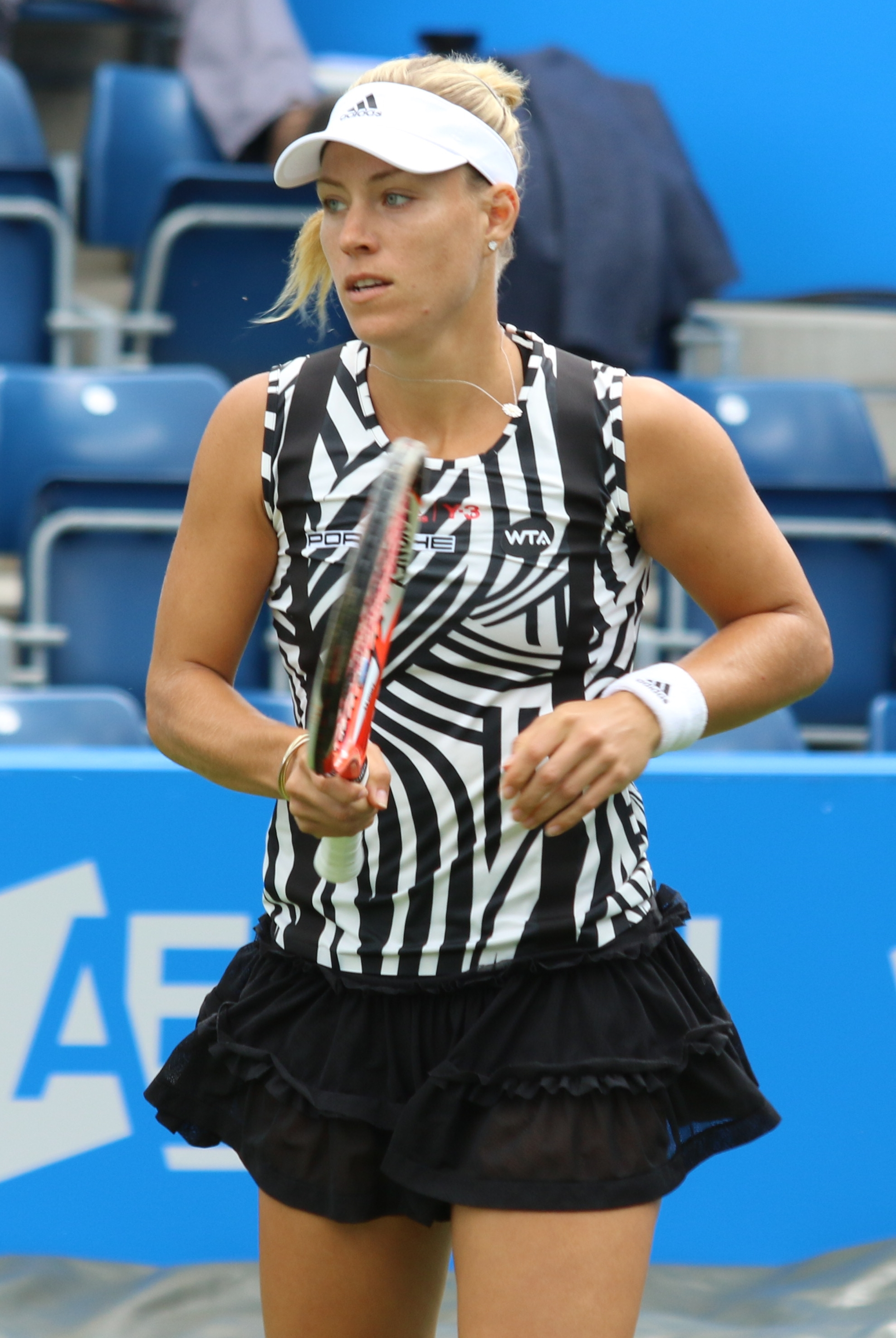
Angelique Kerber won the Australian and US Open titles on her way to becoming the new World #1.

Kerber struggled for consistency after this triumph; she endured a three-match losing streak, but seemed to turn things around by reaching the semifinals at Miami and defending her title in Stuttgart. However, after this she again lost three straight matches, culminating in a disappointing loss to Kiki Bertens in the first round of the French Open. However, Kerber rediscovered her form on the grass by reaching the Wimbledon final without dropping a set, beating Simona Halep and Venus Williams along the way. There she lost in straight sets to Williams.

Kerber had a successful summer hard-court swing which saw her reach the semifinals at Montreal, win a silver medal at the Olympics, and reach the final at Cincinnati. At the US Open, despite facing pressure to overtake Williams for the #1 player in the world, Kerber reached the semifinals without dropping a set. When Karolína Plíšková beat Williams in the semifinals, Kerber was guaranteed to become the World No. 1 after the tournament. She consolidated her new position by beating Caroline Wozniacki in the semifinals and Plíšková in a three-set final.

Kerber suffered inconsistent results throughout the Asian swing as she tried to adjust to the pressure of being the No. 1 player in the world, however, she heads into Singapore after the best year in her career by far.

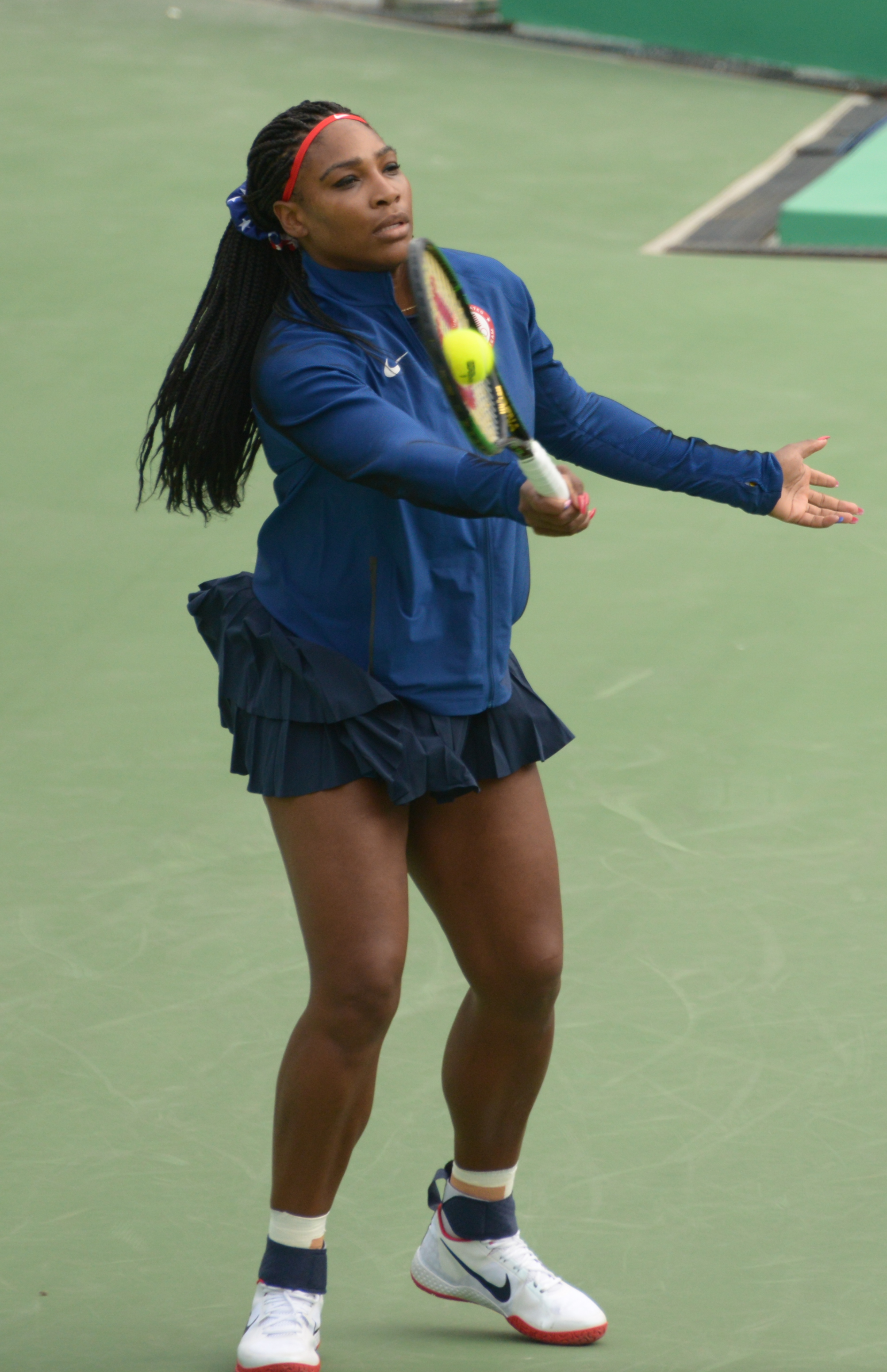
Serena Williams won her 22nd Grand Slam title at Wimbledon.

Serena Williams started her year by reaching the finals of the Australian Open. After handily defeating Maria Sharapova and Agnieszka Radwańska to reach the final, Williams was the heavy favorite to defeat first-time finalist Angelique Kerber, but the German produced an inspired performance to deny Williams her record-tying 22nd Grand Slam title. After taking some time off, Williams returned at Indian Wells, where she lost in the final to Victoria Azarenka. This was the first time since 2004 that Williams had lost two consecutive finals. In Miami, Williams crashed out in the fourth round to Svetlana Kuznetsova.

Williams won the title in Rome, defeating Madison Keys in the final. She reached her second consecutive Grand Slam final at the French Open, but lost in straight sets to Garbiñe Muguruza. Williams rebounded by winning Wimbledon and avenging her defeat to Kerber in the final. This was her 22nd Grand Slam singles title and tied her with Steffi Graf for the most in the Open Era.

After a shoulder injury forced her out of Montreal, Williams slumped to a straight-sets defeat at the hands of Elina Svitolina at the Olympics. At the US Open, Williams lost to Karolína Plíšková, guaranteeing that she would relinquish the #1 ranking to Kerber. Williams withdrew from Wuhan and Beijing due to her shoulder injury, and on 17 October she announced that this same injury would rule her out of the WTA Finals.

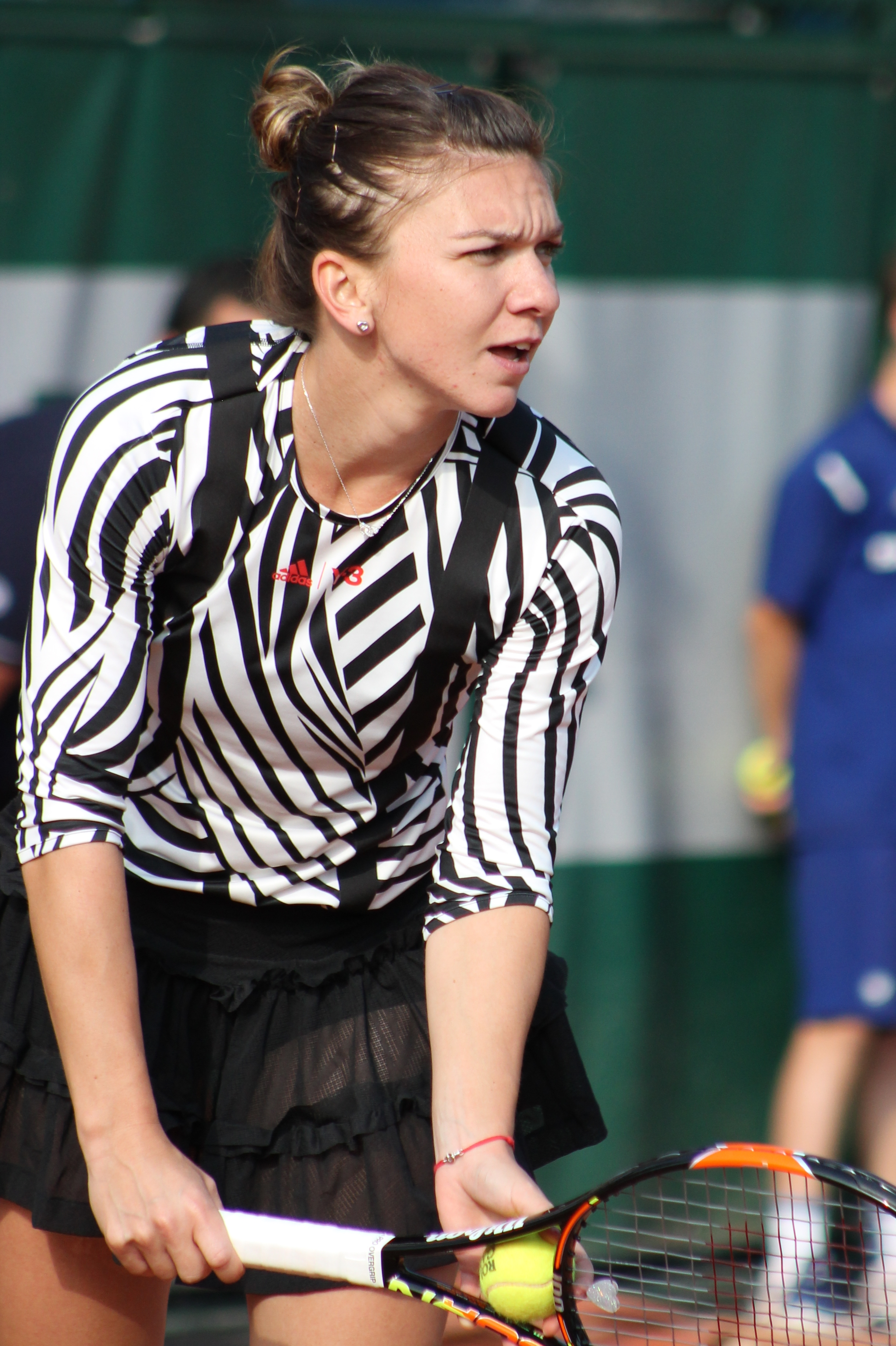
Simona Halep qualifies for the third straight year.

On 29 September, Simona Halep became the third qualifier.

Simona Halep started her 2016 season in poor form. She was upset in the semifinals of Sydney by Svetlana Kuznetsova and then lost in the first round of the Australian Open to Zhang Shuai, who had never before won a Grand Slam main draw match and was planning to retire after the tournament.

Halep attributed her struggles to trouble breathing, and she announced a one-month hiatus to undergo surgery on her nose. However, without announcement Halep chose to play Fed Cup for Romania (winning one of two matches), and entered in Dubai and Doha (losing her first match at both events). After a hitting session with Steffi Graf in Las Vegas, Halep found her game again and reached the quarterfinals at Indian Wells and Miami. Then she cruised to the title in Madrid, beating Dominika Cibulková in the final. At the French Open, Halep was surprised in the fourth round by Samantha Stosur.

Despite having no tournament preparation for Wimbledon, Halep reached the quarterfinals, where she lost to Angelique Kerber in straight sets. Halep then won 13 matches in a row, picking up titles at Bucharest and Montreal and reaching the semifinals at Cincinnati. Halep reached the quarterfinals of the U.S. Open, where she lost to Serena Williams in three sets. Halep reached the semifinals of Wuhan, falling to Petra Kvitová, and she again lost to Zhang in the third round of Beijing.

On 4 October, both Agnieszka Radwańska and Karolína Plíšková became the fourth and fifth qualifiers respectively.

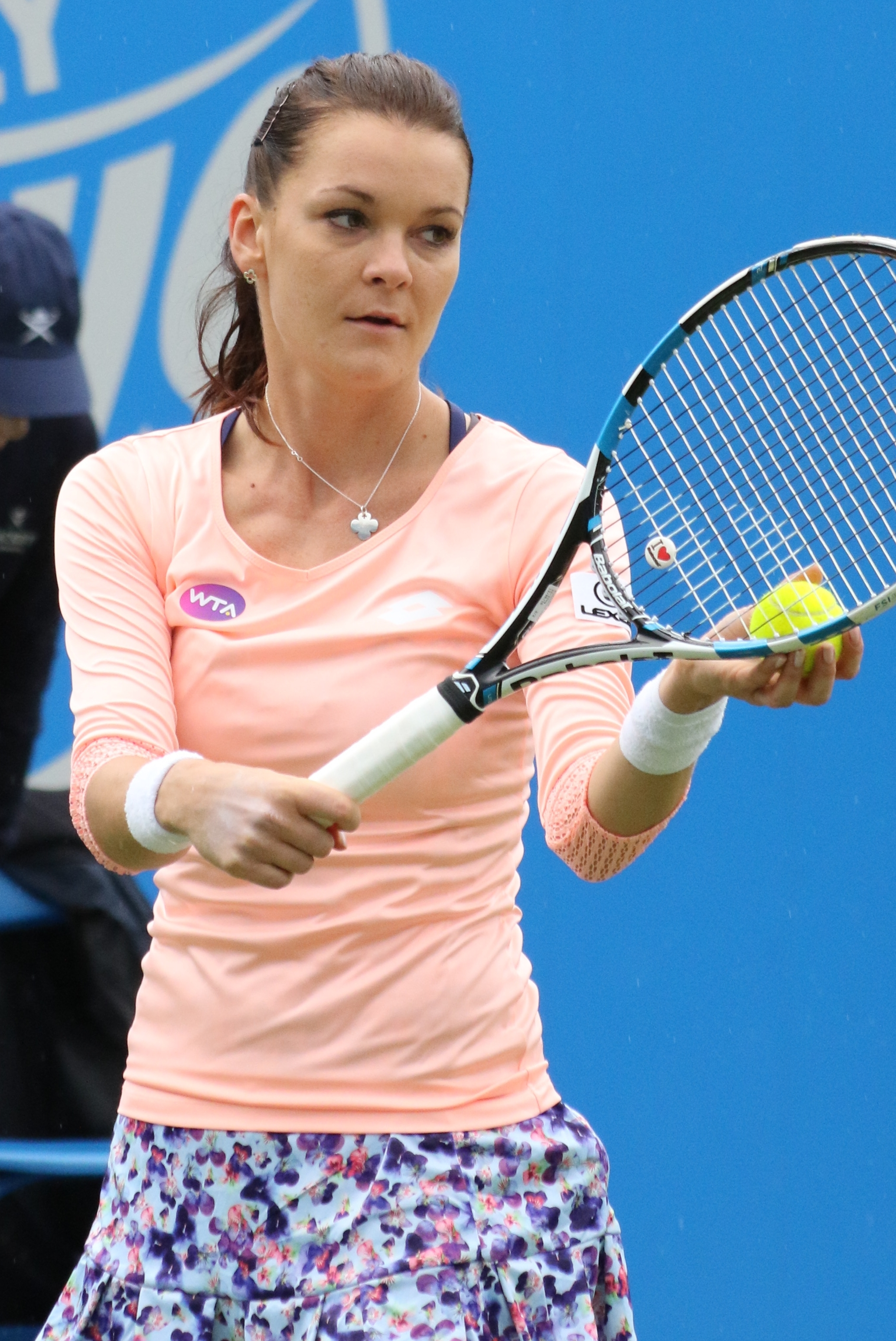
Agnieszka Radwańska became just the fourth active player to have won three or more Premier Mandatory titles.

Agnieszka Radwańska continued her scintillating form from the end of 2015 by winning the title in Shenzhen and reaching the semifinals of the Australian Open. She followed this up with semifinals at Doha and Indian Wells. After this however, her form started to dip. Radwańska was upset by Timea Bacsinszky in Miami and Laura Siegemund in Stuttgart. Radwańska lost a tough three-setter in the first round of Madrid to Dominika Cibulková. Radwańska suffered a fourth round lost to Tsvetana Pironkova in the French Open in a match, that took 3 days to complete.

Radwańska had a surprisingly lackluster grass-court season. She lost to Coco Vandeweghe in the first round of Birmingham, and then lost to Cibulková in the quarterfinals of Eastbourne and the fourth round of Wimbledon in a thrilling 3 setter 9–7 in the third. After being upset by Anastasia Pavlyuchenkova in Montreal, Radwańska crashed out to China's Zheng Saisai in the first round of the Olympics. Radwańska rebounded by reaching the quarterfinals of Cincinnati and winning the title at New Haven. However, she was upset in the fourth round of the U.S. Open by Ana Konjuh.

Radwańska rediscovered her best tennis for the Asian swing, however, as she reached the semifinals of Tokyo, losing a thrilling three-set match to Caroline Wozniacki. She also reached the quarterfinals of Wuhan and won Beijing, beating Johanna Konta in the final.

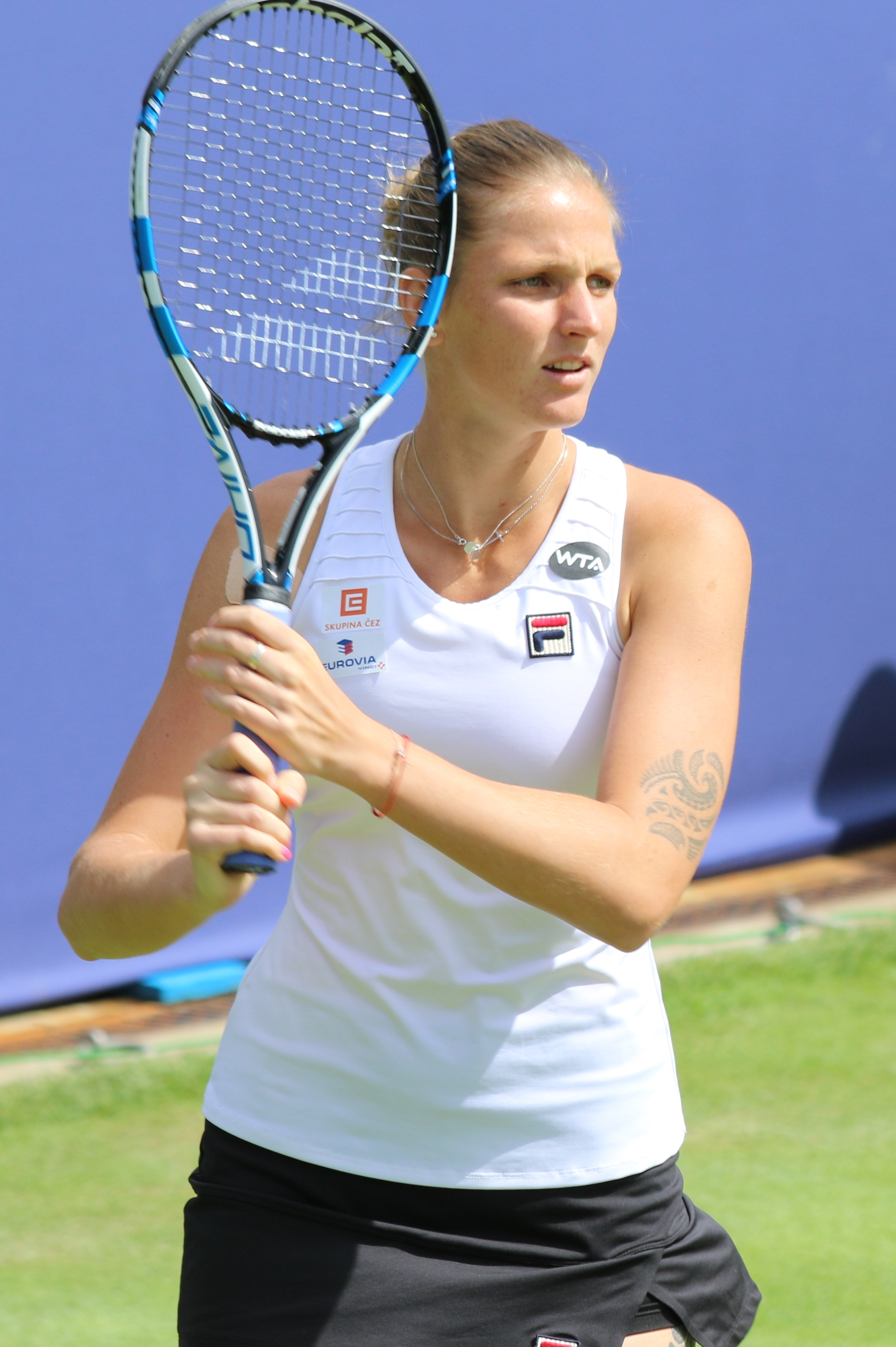
Karolína Plíšková played her maiden Grand Slam final at the US Open.

Karolína Plíšková began the year with underwhelming results, losing in the third round of the Australian Open and in the first round of both Doha and Dubai. After some time off, she rebounded by reaching the semifinals of Indian Wells, where she lost to Victoria Azarenka in three sets. After suffering early losses in Madrid and Rome, Plíšková lost in the first round of the French Open to Shelby Rogers.

Plíšková began to find her form on the grass, winning the title in Nottingham and losing to Dominika Cibulková in the final of Eastbourne. However, she suffered yet another early upset at Wimbledon, losing to Misaki Doi in the second round. After reaching the third round of Montreal, Plíšková chose to skip the Olympics. This decision paid off as she went on to win Cincinnati, beating Garbiñe Muguruza in the semifinals and Angelique Kerber in the final for the loss of four games each. She then finally had a Grand Slam breakthrough at the U.S. Open. After saving a match point to beat Venus Williams in the fourth round, she shocked Serena Williams in straight sets in the semifinals to ensure that Angelique Kerber would become the new World No. 1 after the event. Plíšková lost the final to Kerber in three sets.

Plíšková was unable to match these accomplishments during the Asian swing.

On 14 October, Garbine Muguruza was confirmed as the sixth qualifier for the Championships.

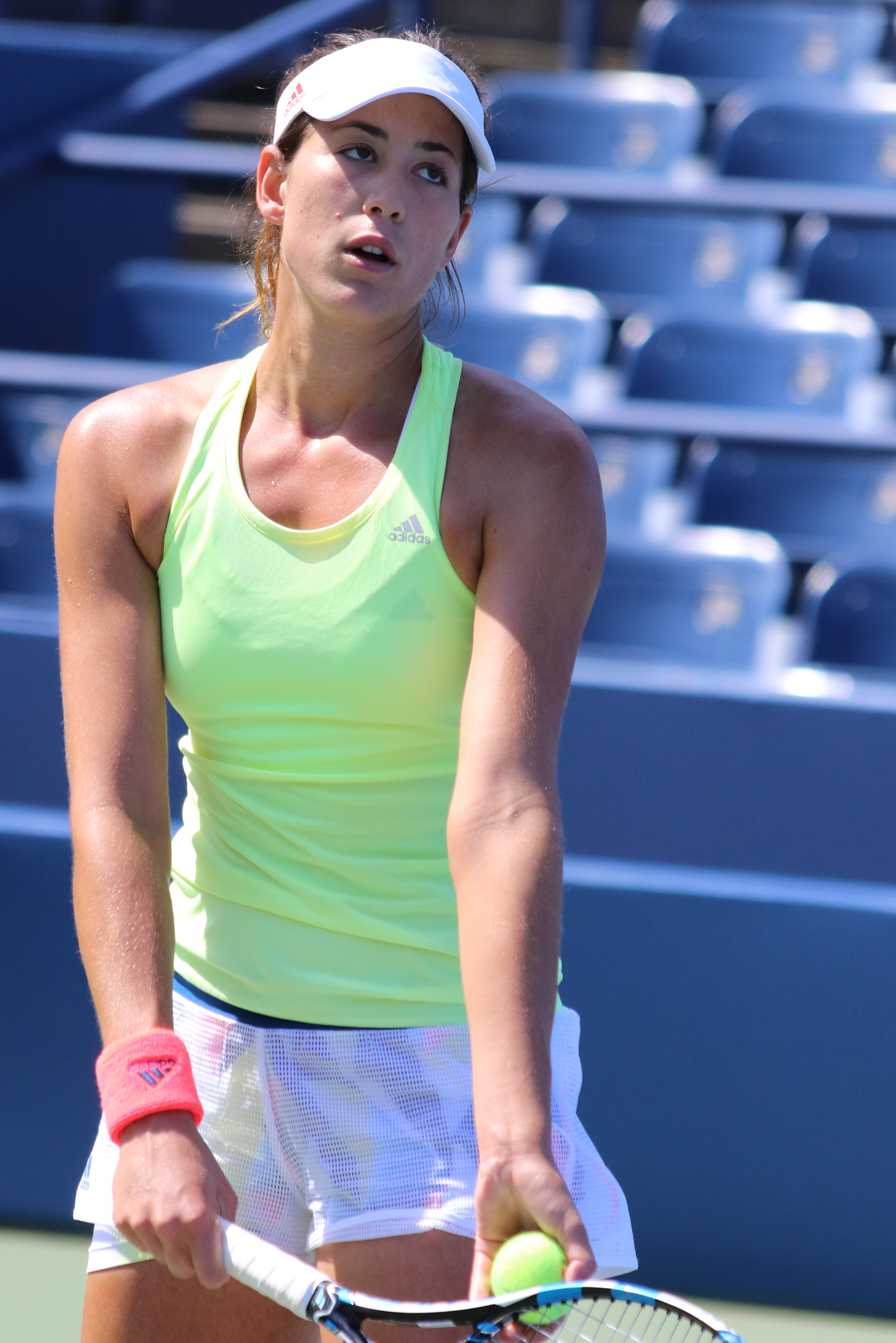
Garbiñe Muguruza won her first Grand Slam title at the French Open.

Garbiñe Muguruza struggled with inconsistency throughout 2016, yet she still won her first Grand Slam title at the French Open. She started the year by retiring from her opening-round match in Brisbane and then suffered a shock third-round loss to Barbora Strýcová at the Australian Open. After surprise losses to Elina Svitolina in Dubai, Andrea Petkovic in Doha, and Christina McHale in Indian Wells, Muguruza started to find her form in Miami, where she lost to Victoria Azarenka in a high-quality straight-set match in the fourth round. Muguruza's game continued to improve as she reached the semifinals of Rome, losing to Madison Keys. At the French Open, Muguruza dropped the first set of her opening match against Anna Karolína Schmiedlová but went on to win the next 12 sets she played, culminating in a straight-sets defeat of World No. 1 Serena Williams in the final.

Muguruza's results dipped after this triumph as she struggled to cope with the pressure of being a Grand Slam champion. After losing in the first round at Mallorca, Muguruza crashed out to Jana Čepelová in the second round of Wimbledon. Muguruza then lost to eventual gold-medalist Monica Puig at the Olympics. She rebounded by reaching the semifinals of Cincinnati, but was stunned by Anastasija Sevastova in the second round of the U.S. Open. Muguruza suffered early exits throughout the Asian swing, but she officially qualified for Singapore by reaching the quarterfinals at Linz. However, in her quarterfinal match against Viktorija Golubic, Muguruza rolled her ankle on court and was forced to retire. As of now, however, she still expects to be healthy in time for Singapore.

On 16 October, Madison Keys and Dominika Cibulková became what was then the last two qualifiers for the Championships. However Serena Williams withdrawal due to injury a day later opened up a further spot.

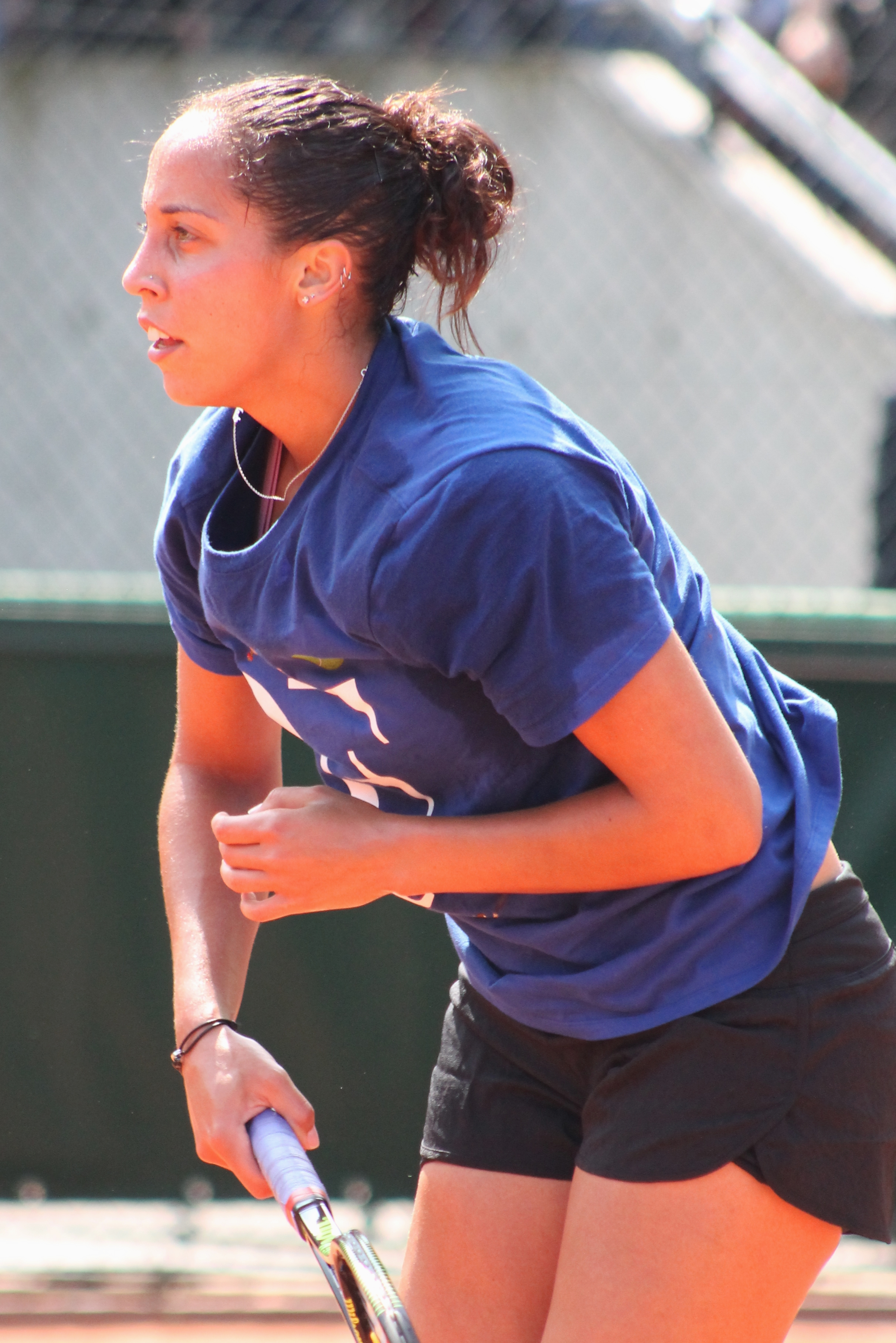
Madison Keys reached two Premier 5 finals.

Madison Keys will play in her first WTA Finals after making her debut in the top 10 this year. After a fourth-round showing at the Australian Open, Keys struggled until May, when she reached the final of Rome, losing to Serena Williams. She followed this up by reaching the fourth round of the French Open and winning Birmingham to officially enter the top ten. She lost to Simona Halep in the fourth round of Wimbledon in three sets, but rebounded by reaching the final of Montreal, losing again to Halep. Keys reached the semifinals of the Olympics, but was the only one of the final four to walk away without a medal. At the U.S. Open, Keys again lost in the fourth round, this time to Caroline Wozniacki. However, she rebounded in the Asian swing by reaching the quarterfinals of Wuhan and the semifinals of Beijing. She qualified for Singapore by reaching the semifinals of Linz.

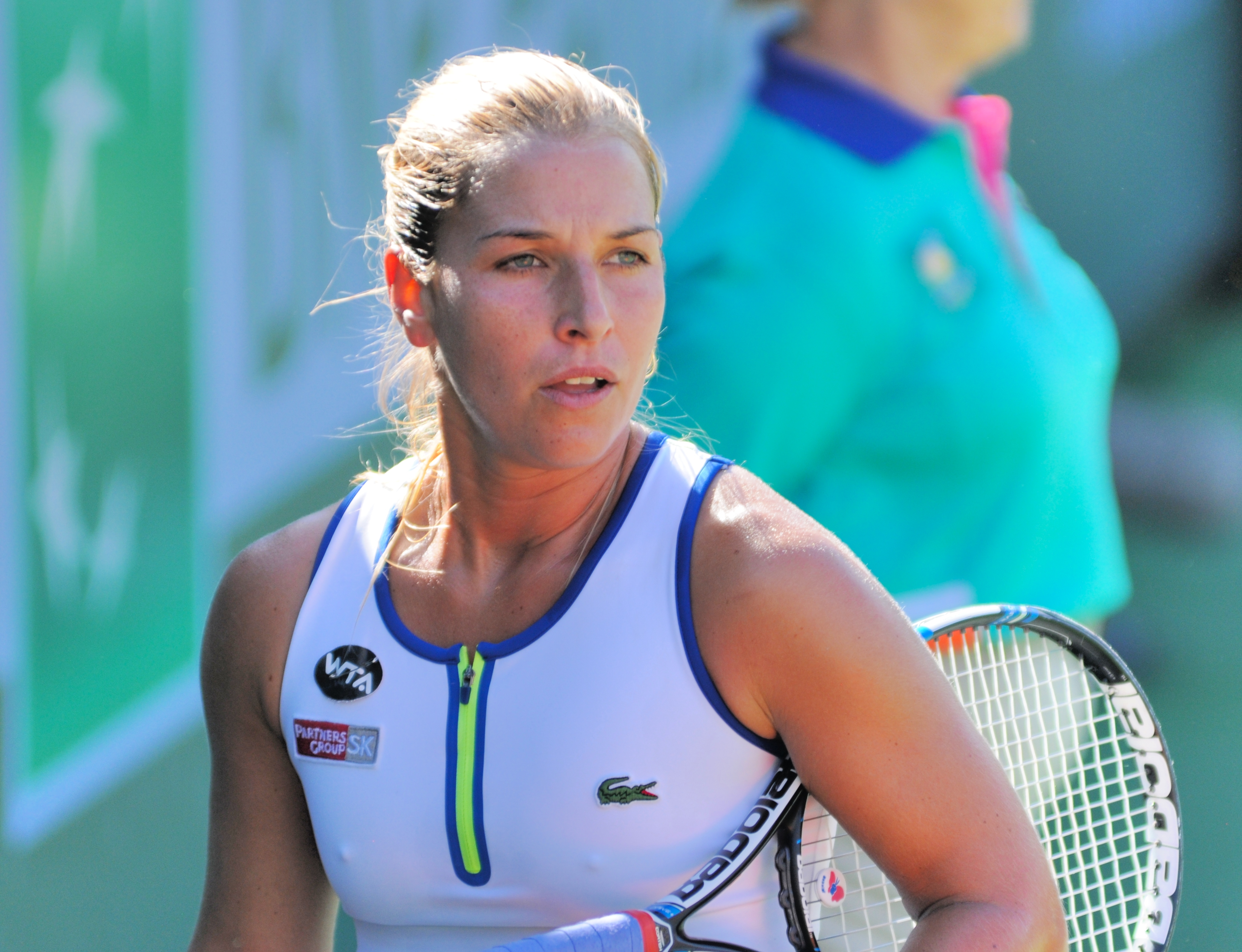
Dominika Cibulková reached six WTA finals.

Dominika Cibulková enjoyed her most consistent season to date and as a result will make her debut at the WTA Finals. She began the year with a lowly rank as she continued her comeback from Achilles surgery the previous year. After reaching the semifinals of Hobart, she lost in the first round of the Australian Open to Kristina Mladenovic. Cibulková then reached the final of Acapulco, where she lost to Sloane Stephens in a third-set tiebreak. At Indian Wells and Miami, she lost 7–5 in the third set to both Agnieszka Radwańska and Garbiñe Muguruza. She rebounded from these heartbreaking defeats by defeating Camila Giorgi to lift the trophy in Katowice. She carried this form into Madrid, where she beat Agnieszka Radwańska in the first round and went on to lose to Simona Halep in the final. Cibulková lost to Carla Suarez Navarro in the third round of the French Open but rebounded by winning the title in Eastbourne, coming from a set and a break down to upset Radwańska in the quarterfinals and beating Karolína Plíšková in the final. At Wimbledon, Cibulková once again defeated Radwańska in another 3 set battle in the fourth round before losing to Elena Vesnina in the quarterfinals. Cibulková returned to the top ten after reaching the semifinals in Stanford, but struggled with injury for the next couple of weeks due to playing a heavy grass-court schedule. She returned at the U.S. Open, where she again injured herself and lost in the third round to Lesia Tsurenko. She healed in time for the Asian swing and reached the final of Wuhan, losing to Petra Kvitová. However, an opening-round loss in Beijing placed her qualification dreams in jeopardy. Cibulková took a wildcard into Linz knowing that she would qualify for Singapore by winning the title, and she did, beating Viktorija Golubic in the final.

On 22 October, Svetlana Kuznetsova became the final qualifier for the Championships by virtue of defending her title at the Kremlin Cup, replacing Johanna Konta as the potential final qualifier position.

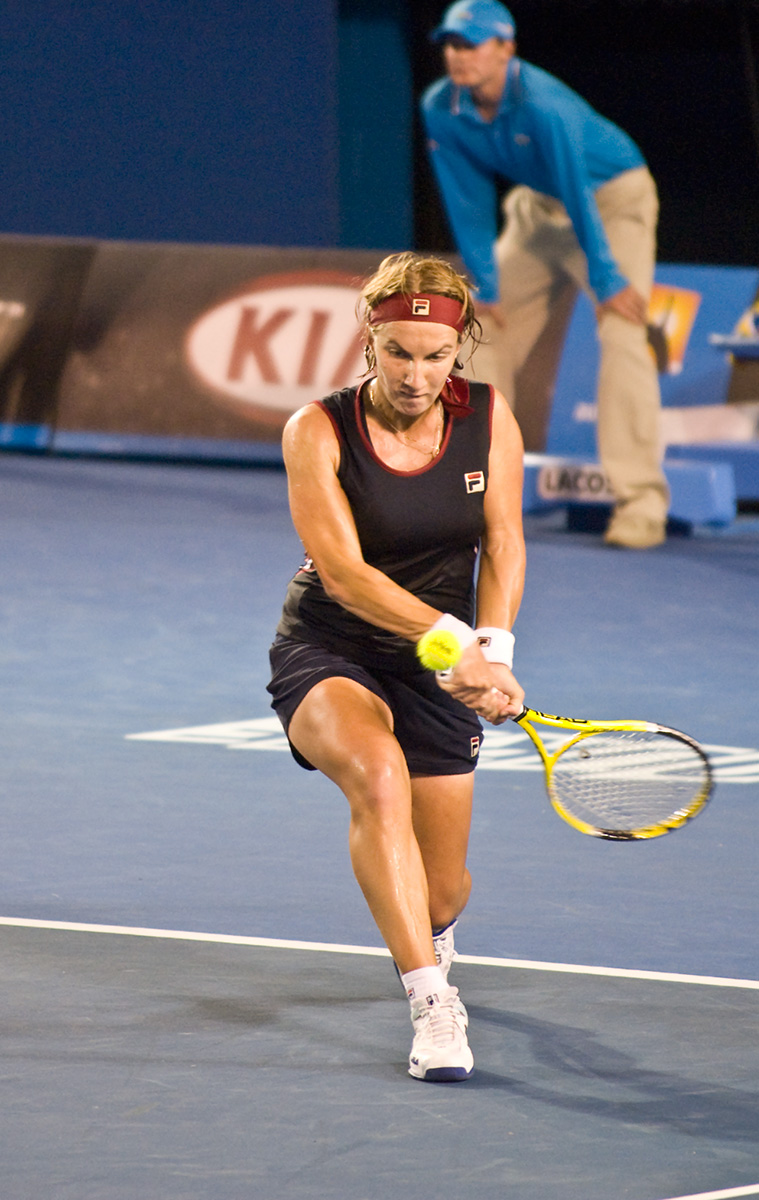
Svetlana Kuznetsova qualifies for the first time since 2009.

Svetlana Kuznetsova returned to the top 10 this season, the first time since 2010. Kuznetsova won her 16th WTA singles title, the Apia International Sydney, in the Australian swing. She did not show good results in the following tournaments, but Kuznetsova recovered in Miami, beating players such as Serena Williams and Ekaterina Makarova en route to reach the final, where she ultimately lost to Victoria Azarenka. The Russian enjoyed moderate success on clay court tournaments; she reached the 4th round of Roland Garros, the quarterfinals of Rome and the semifinals of Prague, but failed in Madrid. Kuznetsova also reached the 4th round at Wimbledon, and the quarterfinals of both the Rogers Cup and Western & Southern Open. In the Asian swing Kuznetsova made it into the semifinals of Wuhan, one of her best results this year. Her diligence in the season's end was justified as she entered the Finals, owing to her semifinal entry in Tianjin and most notable her second triumph in Moscow, and travelled directly to Singapore on the start of the finals. For Kuznetsova it will be the sixth participation at the Championships.

The alternates of the tour are Konta and Carla Suárez Navarro. If Konta was to have qualified in the finals, she would be the first British player to qualify the Tour Finals since Jo Durie in the 1984 Virginia Slims Championships.

=== Doubles ===
#	Players	Points	Tourn	Date Qualified
1	Caroline Garcia (FRA); Kristina Mladenovic (FRA)	7,360	16	6 September
2	Martina Hingis (SUI); Sania Mirza (IND)	6,315	14	21 June
3	Bethanie Mattek-Sands (USA); Lucie Šafářová (CZE)	5,226	7	1 October
4	Ekaterina Makarova (RUS); Elena Vesnina (RUS)	4,495	7	13 September
5	Tímea Babos (HUN); Yaroslava Shvedova (KAZ)	3,975	12	5 October
6	Chan Hao-ching (TPE); Chan Yung-jan (TPE)	3,845	18	5 October
7	Andrea Hlaváčková (CZE); Lucie Hradecká (CZE)	3,775	16	5 October
8	Julia Görges (GER); Karolína Plíšková (CZE)	3,485	11	5 October

On 21 June, Martina Hingis and Sania Mirza became the first qualifiers.

Martina Hingis and Sania Mirza resumed their match winning streak record which started in the last-year's Western & Southern Open, winning Brisbane, Sydney, the Australian Open, and St. Petersburg in the 2016 season. They finally capitulated in their 41st match against Daria Kasatkina and Elena Vesnina in Doha. The pair could not get beyond the 2nd Round in the next tournaments, Indian Wells and Miami, after receiving a bye in both. In the following clay tournaments they became runners-up twice in a row, both times to Caroline Garcia and Kristina Mladenovic, at the Stuttgart Open and the Madrid Open. Finally, the duo won their first clay tournament in Rome, but failed to achieve their Career Grand Slam at Roland Garros. Their partnership ended after five months of disappointing results; beginning with the Western & Southern Open, both have played with different partners.

For Hingis, it will be the seventh participation at the Finals, for Mirza the third. Hingis won the Finals thrice, while Mirza twice. They are the defending champions.

On 6 September, Caroline Garcia and Kristina Mladenovic became the second qualifiers.

Caroline Garcia and Kristina Mladenovic reached a final already in their first joint season's debut at the Apia International Sydney. They also became runners-up of the Dubai Tennis Championships, but their major success this year came at clay tournaments. They won four out of five major clay tournaments, Charleston, Stuttgart, Madrid and the French Open, crushing doubles giants as Hingis/Mirza, Makarova/Vesnina and Mattek-Sands/Šafářová in the finals. They won 16 clay matches in a row (including a rubber at the Fed Cup), until being defeated in Rome. The French duo has also been successful on other Grand Slam tournaments; at Wimbledon they reached the quarterfinals, at the US Open they reached the final, which led to their qualification for the Championships. Garcia and Mladenovic reached another final at the China Open, losing there to Mattek-Sands/Šafářová.

The French duo will debut at the Championships. Mladenovic previously participated with Tímea Babos. Garcia previously participated with Katarina Srebotnik.

On 13 September, Ekaterina Makarova and Elena Vesnina became the third qualifiers.

Ekaterina Makarova and Elena Vesnina did not play together since last year's Rogers Cup, where they had to retire in the 2nd Round due to Makarova's injury. Since February 2016, both played for a time with other partners. Since their reunion at the April's Madrid Open, where they reached the semifinals, the duo never got below the quarterfinals, except in late Beijing. After Madrid two finals in a row followed, in Rome and Paris. The grass court season was less comfortable for the Russians; the best result was reaching the quarterfinals at Wimbledon. However, the pair showed some great results in the American continent, claiming the Rogers Cup, the Olympics in Rio de Janeiro, and finally reaching the semifinals of the US Open, losing only to Mattek-Sands/Šafářová.

For both players it will be the third Championships. They once got into the finals in their debut appearance. Last year they could not compete together at the Finals due to Makarova's injury.

On 1 October, Bethanie Mattek-Sands and Lucie Šafářová became the fourth qualifiers.

Bethanie Mattek-Sands and Lucie Šafářová made a break in their joint team play after Šafářová's health was unstable throughout the first season quarter. They reunited in Miami, there claiming the title. The duo played their last tournament for now in Charleston, coming second place. The following months were dreadful for both players, losing in the first and second rounds several times, in some tournaments with different partners. They recovered at the US Open, winning their third Grand Slam tournament. In Asia, the American-Czech duo won two trophies in Wuhan and Beijing.

For both players it will be the second Championships following last-year's tournament.

On 5 October, the field was rounded out with the last four teams, Tímea Babos and Yaroslava Shvedova, Chan Hao-ching and Chan Yung-jan, Andrea Hlaváčková and Lucie Hradecká, Julia Görges and Karolína Plíšková.

Tímea Babos and Yaroslava Shvedova made their debut as a pair this year. Babos played a quite successful season with Mladenovic last season, entering the 2015 WTA Finals. Shvedova also had a strong partnership with Australian's Casey Dellacqua, although they could not qualify for the Championships. Both players switched between different partners in the new season, and finally they decided to play together starting with Indian Wells, where they reached the semifinals. This was swiftly followed by a run to the final in Miami. Their performance in the clay court season was less successful, but they had some success on grass, in particular at Eastbourne and Wimbledon, reaching the semifinals and final respectively.

For Babos it will be her second time competing at the Championships, while for Shvedova it will be her third time competing this year.

Chan Hao-ching and Chan Yung-jan have been regularly playing together. They started the season quite well, reaching the quarterfinals of the Australian Open and triumphing in Doha and Kaohsiung. The pair continued to enjoy moderate success throughout the year, reaching the quarterfinals of the French Open, as well as the semifinals in Birmingham and final in Eastbourne. In the Asian swing the sisters made the semifinals of both Wuhan and Beijing.

This will be the second consecutive time the Chan sisters have qualified for Singapore.

Andrea Hlaváčková and Lucie Hradecká accomplished their season's best result at the Australian Open, reaching the final. The Czech duo performed well in Premier tournaments, reaching the quarterfinals of Miami, Indian Wells and Madrid, as well as triumphing in Montreal, and placing fourth at the Olympics. Finally the duo won their second title this year, the Kremlin Cup, another being Tournoi de Québec. This will be the third time the Czechs will participate at the Championships; the duo once reached the final in 2012 and the semifinals last year.

Julia Görges and Karolína Plíšková made their breakthrough at the Australian Open, reaching the semifinals. This result was followed by a runner up appearance in Indian Wells, as well as a run to the semifinals of Wimbledon. Among the best results were reaching the semifinals in Cincinnati and the quarterfinals in Beijing. Plíšková will debut in the singles and in the doubles event, while Görges is also debuting in the doubles event.

== Groupings ==
=== Singles ===
The 2016 edition of the year–end finals will feature the current world No. 1, three major champions and four major finalists. The competitors were divided into two groups, representing the colors of the flag of Singapore.

Red group:
Angelique Kerber, Simona Halep, Madison Keys & Dominika Cibulková
White group:
Agnieszka Radwańska, Karolína Plíšková, Garbiñe Muguruza & Svetlana Kuznetsova

== Day-by-day summaries ==
=== Day 1 (23 October) ===
Matches
Event	Group	Winner	Loser	Score
Singles round robin	Red Group	(Romania) Simona Halep [3]	(United States) Madison Keys [6]	6–2, 6–4
Singles round robin	Red Group	(Germany) Angelique Kerber [1]	(Slovakia) Dominika Cibulková [7]	7–6^{(7–5)}, 2–6, 6–3

=== Day 2 (24 October) ===
Matches
Event	Group	Winner	Loser	Score
Singles round robin	White Group	(Russia) Svetlana Kuznetsova [8]	(Poland) Agnieszka Radwańska [2]	7–5, 1–6, 7–5
Singles round robin	White Group	(Czech Republic) Karolína Plíšková [4]	(Spain) Garbiñe Muguruza [5]	6–2, 6–7^{(4–7)}, 7–5

=== Day 3 (25 October) ===
Matches
Event	Group	Winner	Loser	Score
Singles round robin	Red Group	(Germany) Angelique Kerber [1]	(Romania) Simona Halep [3]	6–4, 6–2
Singles round robin	Red Group	(United States) Madison Keys [6]	(Slovakia) Dominika Cibulková [7]	6–1, 6–4

=== Day 4 (26 October) ===
Matches
Event	Group	Winner	Loser	Score
Singles round robin	White Group	(Russia) Svetlana Kuznetsova [8]	(Czech Republic) Karolína Plíšková [4]	3–6, 6–2, 7–6^{(8–6)}
Singles round robin	White Group	(Poland) Agnieszka Radwańska [2]	(Spain) Garbiñe Muguruza [5]	7–6^{(7–1)}, 6–3

=== Day 5 (27 October) ===
Matches
Event	Group	Winner	Loser	Score
Day Session
Doubles Elimination	Quarterfinals	(France) Caroline Garcia (France) Kristina Mladenovic [1]	(Germany) Julia Görges (Czech Republic) Karolína Plíšková [8]	6–4, 6–2
Singles round robin	Red Group	(Slovakia) Dominika Cibulková [7]	(Romania) Simona Halep [3]	6–3, 7–6^{(7–5)}
Evening Session
Singles round robin	Red Group	(Germany) Angelique Kerber [1]	(United States) Madison Keys [6]	6–3, 6–3
Doubles Elimination	Quarterfinals	(United States) Bethanie Mattek-Sands (Czech Republic) Lucie Šafářová [3]	(Hungary) Tímea Babos (Kazakhstan) Yaroslava Shvedova [7]	5–7, 7–6^{(8–6)}, [10–2]

=== Day 6 (28 October) ===
Matches
Event	Group	Winner	Loser	Score
Day Session
Doubles Elimination	Quarterfinals	(Switzerland) Martina Hingis (India) Sania Mirza [2]	(Chinese Taipei) Chan Hao-ching (Chinese Taipei) Chan Yung-jan [6]	7–6^{(12–10)}, 7–5
Singles round robin	White Group	(Spain) Garbiñe Muguruza [5]	(Russia) Svetlana Kuznetsova [8]	3–6, 6–0, 6–1
Evening Session
Singles round robin	White Group	(Poland) Agnieszka Radwańska [2]	(Czech Republic) Karolína Plíšková [4]	7–5, 6–3
Doubles Elimination	Quarterfinals	(Russia) Ekaterina Makarova (Russia) Elena Vesnina [4]	(Czech Republic) Andrea Hlaváčková (Czech Republic) Lucie Hradecká [5]	6–2, 7–5

=== Day 7 (29 October) ===
Matches
Event	Winner	Loser	Score
Day Session
Doubles Semifinals	(United States) Bethanie Mattek-Sands (Czech Republic) Lucie Šafářová [3]	(France) Caroline Garcia (France) Kristina Mladenovic [1]	6–3, 7–5
Singles Semifinals	(Slovakia) Dominika Cibulková [7]	(Russia) Svetlana Kuznetsova [8]	1–6, 7–6^{(7–2)}, 6–4
Evening Session
Singles Semifinals	(Germany) Angelique Kerber [1]	(Poland) Agnieszka Radwańska [2]	6–2, 6–1
Doubles Semifinals	(Russia) Ekaterina Makarova (Russia) Elena Vesnina [4]	(Switzerland) Martina Hingis (India) Sania Mirza [2]	3–6, 6–2 [10–6]

=== Day 8 (30 October) ===
Matches
Event	Winner	Loser	Score
Doubles Final	(Russia) Ekaterina Makarova (Russia) Elena Vesnina [4]	(United States) Bethanie Mattek-Sands (Czech Republic) Lucie Šafářová [3]	7–6^{(7–5)}, 6–3
Singles Final	(Slovakia) Dominika Cibulková [7]	(Germany) Angelique Kerber [1]	6–3, 6–4

== Points breakdown ==
=== Singles ===
Players in gold have qualified for Singapore. Players in brown have qualified, but withdrawn. The low-ranked players after them would be played as alternates in Singapore.

Rank	Player	Grand Slam tournament				Premier Mandatory				Best Premier 5		Best other						Total points	Tourn	Titles
Rank	Player	AUS	FRA	WIM	USO	INW	MIA	MAD	BEI	1	2	1	2	3	4	5	6	Total points	Tourn	Titles
1	(Germany) Angelique Kerber	W 2000	R128; 10	F 1300	W 2000	R64; 10	SF; 390	R64; 10	R16; 120	F 585	SF; 350	W 470	F 305	SF; 185	R16; 105	QF; 100	QF; 60	8000	20	3
2	(United States) Serena Williams	F 1300	F 1300	W 2000	SF; 780	F 650	R16; 120	A 0	A 0	W 900								7050	7	2
3	(Poland) Agnieszka Radwańska	SF; 780	R16; 240	R16; 240	R16; 240	SF; 390	R16; 120	R64; 10	W 1000	SF; 350	QF; 190	W 470	W 280	QF; 190	SF; 185	SF; 185	R16; 105	4975	19	3
4	(Romania) Simona Halep	R128; 10	R16; 240	QF; 430	QF; 430	QF; 215	QF; 215	W 1000	R16; 120	W 900	SF; 350	SF; 350	W 280	SF; 185	R16; 1	R16; 1	R32; 1	4728	17	3
5	(Czech Republic) Karolína Plíšková	R32; 130	R128; 10	R64; 70	F 1300	SF; 390	R64; 10	R32; 65	R16; 120	W 900	R16; 105	F 305	W 280	SF; 110	R16; 105	QF; 100	QF; 100	4100	21	2
6	(Spain) Garbiñe Muguruza	R32; 130	W 2000	R64; 70	R64; 70	R64; 10	R16; 120	R32; 65	R16; 120	SF; 350	SF; 350	QF; 190	QF; 100	QF; 100	QF; 60	R16; 1	A 0	3736	19	1
7	(United States) Madison Keys	R16; 240	R16; 240	R16; 240	R16; 240	R64; 10	QF; 215	R16; 120	SF; 390	F 585	F 585	W 470	QF; 190	SF; 110	R32; 1	R32; 1		3637	15	1
8	(Slovakia) Dominika Cibulková	R128; 10	R32; 130	QF; 430	R32; 130	R64; 35	R64; 35	F 650	R32; 10	F 585	R16; 105	W 470	W 280	W 280	SF; 185	F 180	SF; 110	3625	22	3
9	(Russia) Svetlana Kuznetsova	R64; 70	R16; 240	R16; 240	R64; 70	R64; 10	F 650	R64; 10	R16; 120	SF; 350	QF; 190	W 470	W 470	QF; 190	QF; 190	SF; 110	SF; 110	3490	20	2
Alternates\WTA Elite Trophy
10	(United Kingdom) Johanna Konta	SF; 780	R128; 10	R64; 70	R16; 240	R16; 120	QF; 215	R64; 10	F 650	QF; 190	QF; 190	W 470	SF; 185	R16; 105	R16; 105	QF; 60	R16; 55	3455	22	1
11	(Spain) Carla Suárez Navarro	QF; 430	R16; 240	R16; 240	R16; 240	A 0	R64; 10	R16; 120	R64; 10	W 900	QF; 190	SF; 185	SF; 185	SF; 110	R16; 105	R16; 105	QF; 100	3170	22	1

=== Doubles ===
Rank	Team	Points											Total Points	Tourn	Titles
Rank	Team	1	2	3	4	5	6	7	8	9	10	11	Total Points	Tourn	Titles
1	(France) Caroline Garcia (France) Kristina Mladenovic	W 2000	W 1000	F 1300	F 650	W 470	W 470	QF; 430	F 305	F 305	R16; 240	QF; 190	7360	16	4
2	(Switzerland) Martina Hingis (India) Sania Mirza	W 2000	W 900	F 650	W 470	W 470	W 470	QF; 430	F 305	R16; 240	QF; 190	QF; 190	6315	14	5
3	(United States) Bethanie Mattek-Sands (Czech Republic) Lucie Šafářová	W 2000	W 1000	W 1000	W 900	F 305	R64; 10	R64; 10	R16; 1				5226	8	4
4	(Russia) Ekaterina Makarova (Russia) Elena Vesnina	F 1300	W 900	SF; 780	F 585	QF; 430	SF; 390	QF; 100	R16; 10	R16; 1			4496	9	1
5	(Czech Republic) Andrea Hlaváčková (Czech Republic) Lucie Hradecká	F 1300	W 470	QF; 430	SF; 350	W 280	R16; 240	R16; 240	QF; 215	QF; 215	QF; 215	SF; 185	4140	17	2
6	(Chinese Taipei) Chan Hao-ching (Chinese Taipei) Chan Yung-jan	W 900	QF; 430	QF; 430	SF; 390	SF; 350	SF; 350	F 305	W 280	W 280	QF; 215	SF; 185	4115	20	3
7	(Hungary) Tímea Babos (Kazakhstan) Yaroslava Shvedova	F 1300	F 650	SF; 390	R16; 240	R16; 240	QF; 215	QF; 190	QF; 190	QF; 190	SF; 185	SF; 185	3975	12	0
8	(Germany) Julia Görges (Czech Republic) Karolína Plíšková	SF; 780	SF; 780	F 650	SF; 350	R16; 240	R16; 240	QF; 215	R16; 105	R16; 105	R32; 10	R32; 10	3485	11	0
Alternate
9	(United States) Raquel Atawo (United States) Abigail Spears	SF; 780	W 470	QF; 215	QF; 190	QF; 190	QF; 190	SF; 185	R32; 130	R32; 130	SF; 110	SF; 110	2700	21	1

== Player head-to-head ==
Below are the head-to-head records as they approached the tournament.

2016 WTA Finals – Singles

		Kerber	Radwańska	Halep	Plíšková	Muguruza	Keys	Cibulková	Kuznetsova	Overall	YTD
1	(Germany) Angelique Kerber		5–6	3–4	5–3	3–4	5–1	4–4	3–4	28–26	57–16
2	(Poland) Agnieszka Radwańska	6–5		5–5	6–0	3–4	5–1	7–6	4–12	36–33	51–16
3	(Romania) Simona Halep	4–3	5–5		4–1	1–2	4–1	2–3	4–3	24–18	44–16
4	(Czech Republic) Karolína Plíšková	3–5	0–6	1–4		3–1	0–0	0–3	1–0	8–19	42–20
5	(Spain) Garbiñe Muguruza	4–3	4–3	2–1	1–3		0–2	3–0	1–1	15–13	32–17
6	(United States) Madison Keys	1–5	1–5	1–4	0–0	2–0		3–0	3–0	11–14	43–15
7	(Slovakia) Dominika Cibulková	4–4	6–7	3–2	3–0	0–3	0–3		5–3	21–22	50–19
8	(Russia) Svetlana Kuznetsova	4–3	12–4	3–4	0–1	1–1	0–3	3–5		23–21	43–20

== See also ==
- 2016 WTA Elite Trophy
- 2016 ATP World Tour Finals
