= 2016 WTA Elite Trophy =

- Date: November 1 – 6
- Edition: 2nd
- Draw: 12S/6D
- Surface: Hard / Outdoor / Covered Court
- Location: Zhuhai, China
- Venue: Hengqin International Tennis Center

Champions

Singles
- (Czech Republic) Petra Kvitová

Doubles
- (Turkey) İpek Soylu / (China) Xu Yifan
← 2015 ·	WTA Elite Trophy	· 2017 →

The 2016 WTA Elite Trophy was a women's tennis tournament played at the Hengqin International Tennis Center in Zhuhai, China from 1 to 6 November 2016. It was the second edition of the singles event and doubles competition. The tournament was contested by twelve singles players and six doubles teams.

== Tournament ==
=== Qualifying ===
WTA Elite Trophy is an invitation-only event.

==== Singles qualifying ====
The field will consist of the top eleven players not already qualified for the 2016 WTA Finals, plus either (a) the 12th-player not qualified for 2016 WTA Finals, or (b) a wild card. The final two alternates for the 2016 WTA Finals would have been eligible to play in WTA Elite Trophy even if they had participated in the WTA Finals. Johanna Konta was initially qualified for the Tour Finals, but her spot was lost to Svetlana Kuznetsova who had just won Moscow on the day before the finals.

==== Doubles qualifying ====
Two teams composed of players that did not compete in the WTA Finals singles (except Finals Alternates) or doubles competitions, using the players’ combined doubles rankings as of the Monday after the final regular-season Tournament of the current Tour Year to determine the order of acceptance; and up to two teams composed of players that did not compete in the WTA Finals singles (except Finals Alternates) or doubles competitions and that include at least one Elite Trophy Singles Qualified Player or Elite Trophy Alternate, using the higher of the players’ combined singles or doubles rankings as of the Monday after the final regular-season Tournament of the current Tour Year to determine the order of acceptance. Plus two wild cards. For each wild card not given out, the next highest pair of players shall become a participant.

It was unclear how the selection was determined eventually as two teams were announced as participants despite not fulfilling these criteria.

=== Format ===
The singles event features twelve players in a round robin event, split into four groups of three. Over the first four days of competition, each player meets the other two players in her group, with the winner in each group advancing to the semifinal. The winners of each semifinal meet in the championship match. The six doubles teams will be split into two round robin groups, with the winner of each advancing to the final.

==== Round robin tie-breaking methods ====
The final standings of each group were determined by the first of the following methods that applied:

1. Greatest number of wins.
2. Greatest number of matches played.
3. Head-to-head results
4. In case of a 3-way tie:
- Percentage of sets won
- Percentage of games won

== Prize money and points ==
The total prize money for the Huajin Securities 2016 WTA Elite Trophy Zhuhai was US $2,210,000.

Stage	Singles		Doubles	
Stage	Prize money	Points	Prize money	Points
Champion	RR^{1} + $450,000	RR + 460	RR^{1} + $20,000	—
Runner-up	RR + $150,000	RR + 200	RR^{1} + $10,000	—
Semifinalist	RR + $15,000	RR	—	—
Round Robin win per match	$92,500	120^{2}	$5,000	—
Round Robin loss per match	$20,000	40^{2}	—	—
Participation fee	—	—	15,000	—
Alternates	$10,000	—	—	—

- ^{1} RR means prize money or points won in the round robin.
- ^{2} The wildcard entry will earn 80 points per win and 0 points per loss in the round robin.

== Player head-to-head ==
Below are the head-to-head records as they approached the tournament.

2016 WTA Elite Trophy – Singles

#	Player	Konta	Suárez Navarro	Kvitová	Svitolina	Vinci	Bacsinszky	Vesnina	Stosur	Strýcová	Bertens	Garcia	Zhang	Overall	YTD
1	(United Kingdom) Johanna Konta		1–0	1–2	0–1	1–0	0–0	1–1	0–0	0–0	1–1	1–1	4–1	10–7	44–21
2	(Spain) Carla Suárez Navarro	0–1		5–5	2–2	6–1	4–3	2–0	3–4	6–1	2–0	0–1	2–0	32–18	39–21
3	(Czech Republic) Petra Kvitová	2–1	5–5		5–1	3–3	0–2	1–0	7–1	6–1	1–0	2–1	1–1	33–16	42–22
4	(Ukraine) Elina Svitolina	1–0	2–2	1–5		1–2	0–1	1–2	0–1	2–0	0–0	1–0	1–0	10–13	38–21
5	(Italy) Roberta Vinci	0–1	1–6	3–3	2–1		1–1	3–5	1–2	4–2	1–2	0–1	2–0	18–24	28–24
6	(Switzerland) Timea Bacsinszky	0–0	3–4	2–0	1–0	1–1		2–1	1–1	0–4	1–2	2–1	0–1	13–15	31–22
7	(Russia) Elena Vesnina	1–1	0–2	0–1	2–1	5–3	1–2		2–3	0–3	0–0	2–0	0–0	13–16	39–19
8	(Australia) Samantha Stosur	0–0	4–3	1–7	1–0	2–1	1–1	3–2		1–2	1–0	0–0	1–2	15–18	30–22
9	(Czech Republic) Barbora Strýcová	0–0	1–6	1–6	0–2	2–4	4–0	3–0	2–1		1–0	5–1	1–0	20–20	37–23
10	(Netherlands) Kiki Bertens	1–1	0–2	0–1	0–0	2–1	2–1	0–0	0–1	0–1		2–0	2–0	9–8	49–20
11	(France) Caroline Garcia	1–1	1–0	1–2	0–1	1–0	1–2	0–2	0–0	1–5	0–2		1–0	7–15	33–24
12	(China) Zhang Shuai	1–4	0–2	1–1	0–1	0–2	1–0	0–0	2–1	0–1	0–2	0–1		5–15	37–21

== Qualified players ==
The 2 tables below are part of the tables from Road to Singapore

=== Singles ===
Players in Gold have qualified for Zhuhai. Players in brown have withdrawn from the 2016 WTA Elite Trophy.

Rank	Player	Grand Slam tournament				Premier Mandatory				Best Premier 5		Best other						Total points	Tours	Titles
Rank	Player	AUS	FRA	WIM	USO	INW	MIA	MAD	BEI	1	2	1	2	3	4	5	6	Total points	Tours	Titles
Qualified for Zhuhai
10	(United Kingdom) Johanna Konta	SF; 780	R128; 10	R64; 70	R16; 240	R16; 120	QF; 215	R64; 10	F 650	QF; 190	QF; 190	W 470	SF; 185	R16; 105	R16; 105	QF; 60	R16; 55	3455	22	1
11	(Spain) Carla Suárez Navarro	QF; 430	R16; 240	R16; 240	R16; 240	A 0	R64; 10	R16; 120	R64; 10	W 900	QF; 190	SF; 185	SF; 185	SF; 110	R16; 105	R16; 105	QF; 100	3170	22	1
12	(Belarus) Victoria Azarenka	QF; 430	R128; 10	A 0	A 0	W 1000	W 1000	R16; 120	A 0	R32; 1		W 470	R16; 30					3061	9	3
13	(Czech Republic) Petra Kvitová	R64; 70	R32; 130	R64; 70	R16; 240	QF; 215	R32; 65	R16; 120	QF; 215	W 900	R16; 105	SF; 185	SF; 185	F 180	R16; 105	R16; 55	A 0	2840	20	1
14	(Ukraine) Elina Svitolina	R64; 70	R16; 240	R64; 70	R32; 130	R32; 65	R16; 120	R32; 65	SF; 390	R16; 105	R32; 60	F 305	W 280	SF; 185	SF; 185	SF; 185	R32; 1	2456	21	1
15	(United States) Venus Williams	R128; 10	R16; 240	SF; 780	R16; 240	R64; 10	R64; 10	A 0	R64; 10	R16; 105	R16; 105	F 305	W 280	R32; 60	R16; 55	R16; 30	R32; 1	2241	15	1
16	(Denmark) Caroline Wozniacki	R128; 10	A 0	R128; 10	SF; 780	R64; 10	R32; 65	A 0	R16; 120	R16; 105	R16; 105	W 470	W 280	SF; 110	QF; 60	QF; 60	R16; 55	2240	21	2
17	(Italy) Roberta Vinci	R32; 130	R128; 10	R32; 130	QF; 430	R16; 120	R32; 65	R64; 10	R32; 65	QF; 190	R16; 105	W 470	R16; 105	QF; 100	QF; 100	QF; 100	R32; 60	2190	22	1
18	(Switzerland) Timea Bacsinszky	R64; 70	QF; 430	R32; 130	R64; 70	R16; 120	SF; 390	R16; 120	R32; 65	QF; 190	R16; 105	W 280	SF; 110	R16; 105	R32; 1	R32; 1	R32; 1	2188	19	1
19	(Russia) Elena Vesnina	Q1; 2	R64; 70	SF; 780	R32; 130	Q1; 2	R32; 95	R32; 95	R64; 10	QF; 220	Q2; 20	F 330	QF; 100	QF; 100	QF; 60	R16; 55	R32; 25	2094	19	0
20	(Australia) Samantha Stosur	R128; 10	SF; 780	R64; 70	R64; 70	R16; 120	R64; 10	SF; 390	R64; 10	R32; 60	R32; 60	F 180	QF; 100	QF; 60	QF; 60	R16; 55	R16; 55	2090	20	0
21	(Czech Republic) Barbora Strýcová	R16; 240	R32; 130	R32; 130	R128; 10	R16; 120	R64; 35	R32; 65	R32; 65	QF; 190	QF; 190	F 305	F 305	R16; 105	QF; 60	R32; 60	R32; 60	2070	21	0
22	(Netherlands) Kiki Bertens	R128; 10	SF; 780	R32; 130	R128; 10	R128; 30	R32; 95	A 0	A 0	R64; 1	R64; 1	W 298	F 180	SF; 110	SF; 110	QF; 60	R32; 18	1912	21	1
23	(France) Caroline Garcia	R128; 10	R64; 70	R64; 70	R32; 130	R128; 10	R32; 65	R32; 65	R16; 120	R32; 60	R64; 1	W 280	W 280	SF; 185	W 160	SF; 110	R16; 55	1725	26	2

==== Other entrants ====
The following player received a wildcard into the singles draw:

- (China) Zhang Shuai

=== Doubles ===
Country	Player	Country	Player	Rank^{1}
SLO	Andreja Klepač	ESP	Arantxa Parra Santonja	65
TUR	İpek Soylu	CHN	Xu Yifan	96
AUS	Anastasia Rodionova	UKR	Olga Savchuk	104
GEO	Oksana Kalashnikova	GER	Tatjana Maria	106

- ^{1} Rankings as of 24 October 2016

==== Other entrants ====
The following pairs received wildcards into the doubles draw:

- (China) Liang Chen / (China) Wang Yafan
- (China) Yang Zhaoxuan / (China) You Xiaodi

== Champions ==
=== Singles ===
- (Czech Republic) Petra Kvitová def. (Ukraine) Elina Svitolina, 6–4, 6–2

=== Doubles ===
- (Turkey) İpek Soylu / (China) Xu Yifan def. (China) Yang Zhaoxuan / (China) You Xiaodi, 6–4, 3–6, [10–7]
