= 2016 Wuhan Open – Doubles =

Doubles
- 2016 Wuhan Open

Final
- Champions: (United States) Bethanie Mattek-Sands (Czech Republic) Lucie Šafářová
- Runners-up: (India) Sania Mirza (Czech Republic) Barbora Strýcová
- Score: 6–1, 6–4

Details
- Draw: 28
- Seeds: 8

Events
Singles	Doubles
- Wuhan Open

Martina Hingis and Sania Mirza were the defending champions, but chose not to participate together. Hingis played alongside CoCo Vandeweghe, but lost in the second round to Aleksandra Krunić and Kateřina Siniaková.

Mirza teamed up with Barbora Strýcová, but lost in the final to Bethanie Mattek-Sands and Lucie Šafářová, 1–6, 4–6.

== Seeds ==
The top four seeds received a bye into the second round.

1. (France) Caroline Garcia / (France) Kristina Mladenovic (second round)
2. (Chinese Taipei) Chan Hao-ching / (Chinese Taipei) Chan Yung-jan (semifinals)
3. (India) Sania Mirza / (Czech Republic) Barbora Strýcová (final)
4. (Switzerland) Martina Hingis / (United States) CoCo Vandeweghe (second round)
5. (United States) Bethanie Mattek-Sands / (Czech Republic) Lucie Šafářová (champions)
6. (Hungary) Tímea Babos / (Kazakhstan) Yaroslava Shvedova (quarterfinals)
7. (Czech Republic) Andrea Hlaváčková / (Czech Republic) Lucie Hradecká (second round)
8. (Germany) Julia Görges / (Czech Republic) Karolína Plíšková (second round)

== Draw ==
Key

- Q = Qualifier
- WC = Wild card
- LL = Lucky loser
- Alt = Alternate
- ITF = ITF entry
- PR = Protected ranking
- SR = Special ranking
- SE = Special exempt
- JE = Junior exempt
- JR = Junior Accelerator Programme entrant
- CO = College Accelerator Programme entrant
- NG = Next Gen Accelerator Program entrant
- w/o = Walkover
- r = Retired
- d = Defaulted

=== Finals ===
Semifinals
(United States) Christina McHale (China) Peng Shuai	4	3
5	(United States) Bethanie Mattek-Sands (Czech Republic) Lucie Šafářová	6	6
3	(India) Sania Mirza (Czech Republic) Barbora Strýcová	6	3	[10]
2	(Chinese Taipei) Chan Hao-ching (Chinese Taipei) Chan Yung-jan	4	6	[7]

Final
5	(United States) Bethanie Mattek-Sands (Czech Republic) Lucie Šafářová	6	6
3	(India) Sania Mirza (Czech Republic) Barbora Strýcová	1	4

=== Top half ===
First round
Alt	(France) A Cornet (France) P Parmentier	2	3
(United States) C McHale (China) S Peng	6	6
(China) C Liang (China) Z Yang	4	5
(Ukraine) K Bondarenko (Chinese Taipei) C-j Chuang	6	7
(Ukraine) O Savchuk (China) Y Wang	6	2	[4]
7	(Czech Republic) A Hlaváčková (Czech Republic) L Hradecká	4	6	[10]
(Serbia) A Krunić (Czech Republic) K Siniaková	7	6
(Australia) D Gavrilova (Russia) D Kasatkina	5	4
(Poland) A Rosolska (United Kingdom) H Watson	4	6	[7]
WC	(China) X Han (China) L Zhu	6	4	[10]
WC	(Romania) S Halep (Latvia) J Ostapenko	1^{r}
5	(United States) B Mattek-Sands (Czech Republic) L Šafářová	3

Second round
1	(France) C Garcia (France) K Mladenovic	6	2	[2]
(United States) C McHale (China) S Peng	3	6	[10]
(Ukraine) K Bondarenko (Chinese Taipei) C-j Chuang	6	4	[10]
7	(Czech Republic) A Hlaváčková (Czech Republic) L Hradecká	4	6	[8]
4	(Switzerland) M Hingis (United States) C Vandeweghe	7^{7}	5	[7]
(Serbia) A Krunić (Czech Republic) K Siniaková	6^{4}	7	[10]
WC	(China) X Han (China) L Zhu	4	6^{7}
5	(United States) B Mattek-Sands (Czech Republic) L Šafářová	6	7^{9}

Quarterfinals
(United States) C McHale (China) S Peng	6	6
(Ukraine) K Bondarenko (Chinese Taipei) C-j Chuang	4	2
(Serbia) A Krunić (Czech Republic) K Siniaková	3	4
5	(United States) B Mattek-Sands (Czech Republic) L Šafářová	6	6

Semifinals
(United States) C McHale (China) S Peng	4	3
5	(United States) B Mattek-Sands (Czech Republic) L Šafářová	6	6

=== Bottom half ===
First round
6	(Hungary) T Babos (Kazakhstan) Y Shvedova	7	6
(Argentina) M Irigoyen (Germany) T Maria	5	3
WC	(Switzerland) T Bacsinszky (Russia) S Kuznetsova	6	6
(Spain) L Arruabarrena (Georgia (country)) O Kalashnikova	3	2
(Spain) A Parra Santonja (Australia) An Rodionova	4	1
(Canada) G Dabrowski (Spain) MJ Martínez Sánchez	6	6
8	(Germany) J Görges (Czech Republic) Ka Plíšková	6	7
WC	(China) C Liu (China) K Zhang	3	5
(China) Y Xu (China) S Zheng	3	4
(United States) R Atawo (United States) A Spears	6	6
(Slovenia) A Klepač (Slovenia) K Srebotnik	7^{7}	6
(Germany) A-L Grönefeld (Czech Republic) K Peschke	6^{3}	4

Second round
6	(Hungary) T Babos (Kazakhstan) Y Shvedova	3
WC	(Switzerland) T Bacsinszky (Russia) S Kuznetsova	0^{r}
(Canada) G Dabrowski (Spain) MJ Martínez Sánchez	6	3	[5]
3	(India) S Mirza (Czech Republic) B Strýcová	3	6	[10]
8	(Germany) J Görges (Czech Republic) Ka Plíšková	3	6	[8]
(United States) R Atawo (United States) A Spears	6	2	[10]
(Slovenia) A Klepač (Slovenia) K Srebotnik	6	5	[8]
2	(Chinese Taipei) H-c Chan (Chinese Taipei) Y-j Chan	3	7	[10]

Quarterfinals
6	(Hungary) T Babos (Kazakhstan) Y Shvedova	3	6^{5}
3	(India) S Mirza (Czech Republic) B Strýcová	6	7^{7}
(United States) R Atawo (United States) A Spears	3	6	[4]
2	(Chinese Taipei) H-c Chan (Chinese Taipei) Y-j Chan	6	0	[10]

Semifinals
3	(India) S Mirza (Czech Republic) B Strýcová	6	3	[10]
2	(Chinese Taipei) H-c Chan (Chinese Taipei) Y-j Chan	4	6	[7]
