= 2016 WTA Finals – Doubles =

Doubles
- 2016 WTA Finals

Final
- Champions: (Russia) Ekaterina Makarova (Russia) Elena Vesnina
- Runners-up: (United States) Bethanie Mattek-Sands (Czech Republic) Lucie Šafářová
- Score: 7–6^{(7–5)}, 6–3

Details
- Draw: 8
- Seeds: 8

Events
Singles	Doubles
- WTA Finals

Ekaterina Makarova and Elena Vesnina defeated Bethanie Mattek-Sands and Lucie Šafářová in the final, 7–6^{(7–5)}, 6–3 to win the doubles tennis title at the 2016 WTA Finals.

Martina Hingis and Sania Mirza were the defending champions, but were defeated in the semifinals by Makarova and Vesnina.

== Seeds ==
1. (France) Caroline Garcia / (France) Kristina Mladenovic (semifinals)
2. (Switzerland) Martina Hingis / (India) Sania Mirza (semifinals)
3. (United States) Bethanie Mattek-Sands / (Czech Republic) Lucie Šafářová (final)
4. (Russia) Ekaterina Makarova / (Russia) Elena Vesnina (champions)
5. (Czech Republic) Andrea Hlaváčková / (Czech Republic) Lucie Hradecká (quarterfinals)
6. (Chinese Taipei) Chan Hao-ching / (Chinese Taipei) Chan Yung-jan (quarterfinals)
7. (Hungary) Tímea Babos / (Kazakhstan) Yaroslava Shvedova (quarterfinals)
8. (Germany) Julia Görges / (Czech Republic) Karolína Plíšková (quarterfinals)

== Draw ==
Key

- Q = Qualifier
- WC = Wild card
- LL = Lucky loser
- Alt = Alternate
- ITF = ITF entry
- PR = Protected ranking
- SR = Special ranking
- SE = Special exempt
- JE = Junior exempt
- JR = Junior Accelerator Programme entrant
- CO = College Accelerator Programme entrant
- NG = Next Gen Accelerator Program entrant
- w/o = Walkover
- r = Retired
- d = Defaulted

=== Draw ===
Quarterfinals
1	(France) Caroline Garcia (France) Kristina Mladenovic	6	6
8	(Germany) Julia Görges (Czech Republic) Karolína Plíšková	4	2
3	(United States) Bethanie Mattek-Sands (Czech Republic) Lucie Šafářová	5	7^{8}	[10]
7	(Hungary) Tímea Babos (Kazakhstan) Yaroslava Shvedova	7	6^{6}	[2]
5	(Czech Republic) Andrea Hlaváčková (Czech Republic) Lucie Hradecká	2	5
4	(Russia) Ekaterina Makarova (Russia) Elena Vesnina	6	7
6	(Chinese Taipei) Chan Hao-ching (Chinese Taipei) Chan Yung-jan	6^{10}	5
2	(Switzerland) Martina Hingis (India) Sania Mirza	7^{12}	7

Semifinals
1	(France) Caroline Garcia (France) Kristina Mladenovic	3	5
3	(United States) Bethanie Mattek-Sands (Czech Republic) Lucie Šafářová	6	7
4	(Russia) Ekaterina Makarova (Russia) Elena Vesnina	3	6	[10]
2	(Switzerland) Martina Hingis (India) Sania Mirza	6	2	[6]

Final
3	(United States) Bethanie Mattek-Sands (Czech Republic) Lucie Šafářová	6^{5}	3
4	(Russia) Ekaterina Makarova (Russia) Elena Vesnina	7^{7}	6
