= 2016 WTA Finals – Singles =

Singles
- 2016 WTA Finals

Final
- Champion: (Slovakia) Dominika Cibulková
- Runner-up: (Germany) Angelique Kerber
- Score: 6–3, 6–4

Details
- Draw: 8 (RR + elimination)
- Seeds: 8

Events
Singles	Doubles
- WTA Finals

Dominika Cibulková defeated Angelique Kerber in the final, 6–3, 6–4 to win the singles tennis title at the 2016 WTA Finals. It was Cibulková's eighth and final WTA Tour singles title, before her retirement in 2019. For the second year in a row, the eventual champion lost two matches in the round-robin stage.

Agnieszka Radwańska was the defending champion, but lost in the semifinals to Kerber.

Cibulková, Madison Keys, and Karolína Plíšková made their debuts in the event.

== Seeds ==
1. (Germany) Angelique Kerber (final)
2. (Poland) Agnieszka Radwańska (semifinals)
3. (Romania) Simona Halep (round robin)
4. (Czech Republic) Karolína Plíšková (round robin)
5. (Spain) Garbiñe Muguruza (round robin)
6. (United States) Madison Keys (round robin)
7. (Slovakia) Dominika Cibulková (champion)
8. (Russia) Svetlana Kuznetsova (semifinals)

Notes:

- (United States) Serena Williams had qualified but withdrew due to shoulder injury

== Alternates ==
1. (United Kingdom) Johanna Konta (Did not play)
2. (Spain) Carla Suárez Navarro (Did not play)

== Draw ==
Key

- Q = Qualifier
- WC = Wild card
- LL = Lucky loser
- Alt = Alternate
- ITF = ITF entry
- PR = Protected ranking
- SR = Special ranking
- SE = Special exempt
- JE = Junior exempt
- JR = Junior Accelerator Programme entrant
- CO = College Accelerator Programme entrant
- NG = Next Gen Accelerator Program entrant
- w/o = Walkover
- r = Retired
- d = Defaulted

=== Finals ===
Semifinals
1	(Germany) Angelique Kerber	6	6
2	(Poland) Agnieszka Radwańska	2	1
8	(Russia) Svetlana Kuznetsova	6	6^{2}	4
7	(Slovakia) Dominika Cibulková	1	7^{7}	6

Final
1	(Germany) Angelique Kerber	3	4
7	(Slovakia) Dominika Cibulková	6	6

=== Red group ===
		(Germany) Kerber	(Romania) Halep	(United States) Keys	(Slovakia) Cibulková	RR; W–L	Set; W–L	Game; W–L	Standings
1	(Germany) Angelique Kerber		6–4, 6–2	6–3, 6–3	7–6^{(7–5)}, 2–6, 6–3	3–0	6–1 (86%)	39–27 (59%)	1
3	(Romania) Simona Halep	4–6, 2–6		6–2, 6–4	3–6, 6–7^{(5–7)}	1–2	2–4 (33%)	27–31 (47%)	3
6	(United States) Madison Keys	3–6, 3–6	2–6, 4–6		6–1, 6–4	1–2	2–4 (33%)	24–29 (45%)	4
7	(Slovakia) Dominika Cibulková	6–7^{(5–7)}, 6–2, 3–6	6–3, 7–6^{(7–5)}	1–6, 4–6		1–2	3–4 (43%)	33–36 (48%)	2

Standings are determined by: 1. number of wins; 2. number of matches; 3. in two-player ties, head-to-head records; 4. in three-player ties, (a) percentage of sets won (head-to-head records if two players remain tied), then (b) percentage of games won (head-to-head records if two players remain tied), then (c) WTA rankings.

=== White group ===
		(Poland) Radwańska	(Czech Republic) Plíšková	(Spain) Muguruza	(Russia) Kuznetsova	RR; W–L	Set; W–L	Game; W–L	Standings
2	(Poland) Agnieszka Radwańska		7–5, 6–3	7–6^{(7–1)}, 6–3	5–7, 6–1, 5–7	2–1	5–2 (71%)	42–32 (57%)	2
4	(Czech Republic) Karolína Plíšková	5–7, 3–6		6–2, 6–7^{(4–7)}, 7–5	6–3, 2–6, 6–7^{(6–8)}	1–2	3–5 (38%)	41–43 (49%)	3
5	(Spain) Garbiñe Muguruza	6–7^{(1–7)}, 3–6	2–6, 7–6^{(7–4)}, 5–7		3–6, 6–0, 6–1	1–2	3–5 (38%)	38–39 (49%)	4
8	(Russia) Svetlana Kuznetsova	7–5, 1–6, 7–5	3–6, 6–2, 7–6^{(8–6)}	6–3, 0–6, 1–6		2–1	5–4 (56%)	38–45 (45%)	1

Standings are determined by: 1. number of wins; 2. number of matches; 3. in two-player ties, head-to-head records; 4. in three-player ties, (a) percentage of sets won (head-to-head records if two players remain tied), then (b) percentage of games won (head-to-head records if two players remain tied), then (c) WTA rankings.
