= 2016 Aegon International Eastbourne – Singles =

Singles
- 2016 Aegon International Eastbourne

Final
- Champion: (Slovakia) Dominika Cibulková
- Runner-up: (Czech Republic) Karolína Plíšková
- Score: 7–5, 6–3

Details
- Draw: 48
- Seeds: 16

Events
Singles	Doubles
- Aegon International Eastbourne

Belinda Bencic was the defending champion, but lost in the second round to Elena Vesnina.

Dominika Cibulková won the title, defeating Karolína Plíšková in the final, 7–5, 6–3.

== Seeds ==
All seeds received a bye into the second round.

1. (Poland) Agnieszka Radwańska (quarterfinals)
2. (Italy) Roberta Vinci (second round)
3. (Switzerland) Belinda Bencic (second round)
4. (Switzerland) Timea Bacsinszky (second round)
5. (Czech Republic) Petra Kvitová (third round)
6. (Russia) Svetlana Kuznetsova (second round)
7. (Australia) Samantha Stosur (second round)
8. (Spain) Carla Suárez Navarro (second round)

9. (United States) Madison Keys (withdrew)
10. (Czech Republic) Karolína Plíšková (final)
11. (United Kingdom) Johanna Konta (semifinals)
12. (Slovakia) Dominika Cibulková (champion)
13. (Italy) Sara Errani (second round)
14. (Russia) Anastasia Pavlyuchenkova (second round)
15. (Romania) Irina-Camelia Begu (second round)
16. (Czech Republic) Lucie Šafářová (second round)

Click on the seed number of a player to go to their draw section.

== Draw ==
Key

- Q = Qualifier
- WC = Wild card
- LL = Lucky loser
- Alt = Alternate
- ITF = ITF entry
- PR = Protected ranking
- SR = Special ranking
- SE = Special exempt
- JE = Junior exempt
- JR = Junior Accelerator Programme entrant
- CO = College Accelerator Programme entrant
- NG = Next Gen Accelerator Program entrant
- w/o = Walkover
- r = Retired
- d = Defaulted

=== Finals ===
Quarterfinals
1	(Poland) Agnieszka Radwańska	6	6^{2}	3
12	(Slovakia) Dominika Cibulková	4	7^{7}	6
(France) Kristina Mladenovic	6^{6}	6	3
Q	(Puerto Rico) Monica Puig	7^{8}	4	6
10	(Czech Republic) Karolína Plíšková	6	6
(Russia) Elena Vesnina	1	3
11	(United Kingdom) Johanna Konta	7^{7}	6
(Russia) Ekaterina Makarova	6^{5}	4

Semifinals
12	(Slovakia) Dominika Cibulková	6	6
Q	(Puerto Rico) Monica Puig	2	1
10	(Czech Republic) Karolína Plíšková	6^{5}	6	6
11	(United Kingdom) Johanna Konta	7^{7}	3	3

Final
12	(Slovakia) Dominika Cibulková	7	6
10	(Czech Republic) Karolína Plíšková	5	3

=== Top half ===
==== Section 1 ====
First round
LL	(Czech Republic) D Allertová	4	2
Q	(Croatia) M Lučić-Baroni	6	6
(Canada) E Bouchard	6	6
Q	(United States) V Lepchenko	1	2
(Russia) D Kasatkina	6	2	3
(Latvia) J Ostapenko	4	6	6
Q	(Ukraine) K Bondarenko	6	4	6
(Kazakhstan) Y Putintseva	2	6	4

Second round
1	(Poland) A Radwańska	6	2
Q	(Croatia) M Lučić-Baroni	4	1^{r}
(Canada) E Bouchard	6	6
15	(Romania) I-C Begu	3	1
12	(Slovakia) D Cibulková	6	6
(Latvia) J Ostapenko	3	3
Q	(Ukraine) K Bondarenko	2	6	7
6	(Russia) S Kuznetsova	6	4	5

Third round
1	(Poland) A Radwańska	6	6
(Canada) E Bouchard	3	3
12	(Slovakia) D Cibulková	7^{7}	6
Q	(Ukraine) K Bondarenko	6^{3}	3

Quarterfinals
1	(Poland) A Radwańska	6	6^{2}	3
12	(Slovakia) D Cibulková	4	7^{7}	6

==== Section 2 ====
First round
(Belgium) Y Wickmayer	6^{6}	4
(France) K Mladenovic	7^{8}	6
(Germany) A-L Friedsam	6^{3}	6	6
LL	(Estonia) A Kontaveit	7^{7}	4	4
WC	(United Kingdom) N Broady	1	1
Q	(Puerto Rico) M Puig	6	6
(France) A Cornet	1	3
(Denmark) C Wozniacki	6	6

Second round
4	(Switzerland) T Bacsinszky	1	5
(France) K Mladenovic	6	7
(Germany) A-L Friedsam	7^{7}	6
16	(Czech Republic) L Šafářová	6^{5}	4
Q	(Croatia) A Konjuh	1	3^{r}
Q	(Puerto Rico) M Puig	6	5
(Denmark) C Wozniacki	6	6
7	(Australia) S Stosur	2	1

Third round
(France) K Mladenovic	6	7^{7}
(Germany) A-L Friedsam	4	6^{4}
Q	(Puerto Rico) M Puig	4	6	6
(Denmark) C Wozniacki	6	3	4

Quarterfinals
(France) K Mladenovic	6^{6}	6	3
Q	(Puerto Rico) M Puig	7^{8}	4	6

=== Bottom half ===
==== Section 3 ====
First round
(Japan) M Doi	6	6
Q	(Slovenia) P Hercog	4	4
(Slovakia) AK Schmiedlová	1	5
(Australia) D Gavrilova	6	7
Q	(Belgium) A Van Uytvanck	7^{7}	6^{4}	2
Q	(United States) M Brengle	6^{4}	7^{7}	6
(United Kingdom) H Watson	2	3
(Russia) E Vesnina	6	6

Second round
8	(Spain) C Suárez Navarro	6	4	1
(Japan) M Doi	3	6	6
(Australia) D Gavrilova	2	2
10	(Czech Republic) Ka Plíšková	6	6
14	(Russia) A Pavlyuchenkova	4	3
Q	(United States) M Brengle	6	6
(Russia) E Vesnina	7^{7}	7^{7}
3	(Switzerland) B Bencic	6^{4}	6^{5}

Third round
(Japan) M Doi	2	4
10	(Czech Republic) Ka Plíšková	6	6
Q	(United States) M Brengle	6^{2}	4
(Russia) E Vesnina	7^{7}	6

Quarterfinals
10	(Czech Republic) Ka Plíšková	6	6
(Russia) E Vesnina	1	3

==== Section 4 ====
First round
(Hungary) T Babos	6	7^{7}
(Italy) C Giorgi	4	6^{3}
(Ukraine) L Tsurenko	6	7^{7}
LL	(China) S Zhang	1	6^{3}
(Germany) A Petkovic	5	6	6
LL	(China) S Zheng	7	2	4
WC	(United Kingdom) T Moore	5	4
(Russia) E Makarova	7	6

Second round
5	(Czech Republic) P Kvitová	6	7^{7}
(Hungary) T Babos	4	6^{5}
(Ukraine) L Tsurenko	6^{4}	1
11	(United Kingdom) J Konta	7^{7}	6
13	(Italy) S Errani	1	6	4
(Germany) A Petkovic	6	3	6
(Russia) E Makarova	4	6	6
2	(Italy) R Vinci	6	4	3

Third round
5	(Czech Republic) P Kvitová	7	4	0
11	(United Kingdom) J Konta	5	6	6
(Germany) A Petkovic	6	4	0
(Russia) E Makarova	3	6	6

Quarterfinals
11	(United Kingdom) J Konta	7^{7}	6
(Russia) E Makarova	6^{5}	4

== Qualifying ==
=== Seeds ===
1. (Puerto Rico) Monica Puig (qualified)
2. (Montenegro) Danka Kovinić (first round)
3. (Croatia) Mirjana Lučić-Baroni (qualified)
4. (United States) Madison Brengle (qualified)
5. (Belgium) Kirsten Flipkens (withdrew, still competing in Mallorca)
6. (China) Zhang Shuai (qualifying competition, lucky loser)
7. (United States) Varvara Lepchenko (qualified)
8. (Ukraine) Kateryna Bondarenko (qualified)
9. (United States) Christina McHale (withdrew)
10. (United States) Irina Falconi (first round)
11. (United States) Louisa Chirico (first round)
12. (United States) Nicole Gibbs (first round)
13. (Turkey) Çağla Büyükakçay (first round)
14. (China) Zheng Saisai (qualifying competition, lucky loser)
15. (Colombia) Mariana Duque Mariño (first round)
16. (Czech Republic) Denisa Allertová (qualifying competition, lucky loser)

=== Qualifiers ===
1. (Puerto Rico) Monica Puig
2. (Slovenia) Polona Hercog
3. (Croatia) Mirjana Lučić-Baroni
4. (United States) Madison Brengle
5. (Belgium) Alison Van Uytvanck
6. (Croatia) Ana Konjuh
7. (United States) Varvara Lepchenko
8. (Ukraine) Kateryna Bondarenko

=== Lucky losers ===
1. (China) Zhang Shuai
2. (China) Zheng Saisai
3. (Czech Republic) Denisa Allertová
4. (Estonia) Anett Kontaveit

=== Draw ===
==== First qualifier ====
First round
1	(Puerto Rico) Monica Puig	7^{7}	7^{7}
WC	(United Kingdom) Freya Christie	6^{5}	6^{5}
(Poland) Magda Linette	1^{r}
16	(Czech Republic) Denisa Allertová	5

Qualifying competition
1	(Puerto Rico) Monica Puig	6	4	6
16	(Czech Republic) Denisa Allertová	3	6	2

==== Second qualifier ====
First round
2	(Montenegro) Danka Kovinić	7	3	2
(United States) Maria Sanchez	5	6	6
(Slovenia) Polona Hercog	7^{7}	6
13	(Turkey) Çağla Büyükakçay	6^{2}	4

Qualifying competition
(United States) Maria Sanchez	2	4
(Slovenia) Polona Hercog	6	6

==== Third qualifier ====
First round
3	(Croatia) Mirjana Lučić-Baroni	7	7^{7}
(United States) Alison Riske	5	6^{3}
(Ukraine) Olga Savchuk	7^{7}	6
12	(United States) Nicole Gibbs	6^{5}	2

Qualifying competition
3	(Croatia) Mirjana Lučić-Baroni	6	6
(Ukraine) Olga Savchuk	2	2

==== Fourth qualifier ====
First round
4	(United States) Madison Brengle	6	6
WC	(United Kingdom) Katy Dunne	3	3
WC	(United Kingdom) Laura Robson	7	7^{7}
Alt	(China) Xu Yifan	5	6^{4}

Qualifying competition
4	(United States) Madison Brengle	6	1
WC	(United Kingdom) Laura Robson	4	0^{r}

==== Fifth qualifier ====
First round
Alt	(Australia) Anastasia Rodionova	1	1
(Belgium) Alison Van Uytvanck	6	6
(Kazakhstan) Yaroslava Shvedova	6	6
11	(United States) Louisa Chirico	3	1

Qualifying competition
(Belgium) Alison Van Uytvanck	7^{7}	6
(Kazakhstan) Yaroslava Shvedova	6^{2}	4

==== Sixth qualifier ====
First round
6	(China) Zhang Shuai	3	6	6
(Croatia) Donna Vekić	6	3	2
(Croatia) Ana Konjuh	6	2	6
15	(Colombia) Mariana Duque Mariño	4	6	1

Qualifying competition
6	(China) Zhang Shuai	6^{3}	3
(Croatia) Ana Konjuh	7^{7}	6

==== Seventh qualifier ====
First round
7	(United States) Varvara Lepchenko	5
(Romania) Sorana Cîrstea	4^{r}
WC	(United Kingdom) Jodie Burrage	2	5
14	(China) Zheng Saisai	6	7

Qualifying competition
7	(United States) Varvara Lepchenko	6	1	6
14	(China) Zheng Saisai	1	6	0

==== Eighth qualifier ====
First round
8	(Ukraine) Kateryna Bondarenko	7^{7}	6
(Germany) Carina Witthöft	6^{1}	2
(Estonia) Anett Kontaveit	6	6
10	(United States) Irina Falconi	0	0

Qualifying competition
8	(Ukraine) Kateryna Bondarenko	7	1	6
(Estonia) Anett Kontaveit	5	6	4
