= 2016 Wuhan Open =

- Date: September 25 – October 1
- Edition: 3rd
- Category: WTA Premier 5
- Draw: 56S / 28D
- Prize money: $2,589,000
- Surface: Hard / outdoor
- Location: Wuhan, China
- Venue: Optics Valley Int'l Tennis Center

Champions

Singles
- (Czech Republic) Petra Kvitová

Doubles
- (United States) Bethanie Mattek-Sands / (Czech Republic) Lucie Šafářová
← 2015 ·	Wuhan Open	· 2017 →

The 2016 Wuhan Open (also known as the 2016 Dongfeng Motor Wuhan Open for sponsorship reasons) was a women's tennis tournament played on outdoor hard courts between September 25 and October 1, 2016. It was the 3rd edition of the Wuhan Open, and part of the WTA Premier 5 tournaments of the 2016 WTA Tour. The tournament was held at the Optics Valley International Tennis Center in Wuhan, China.

== Points and prize money ==
=== Point distribution ===
Event	W	F	SF	QF	Round of 16	Round of 32	Round of 64	Q	Q2	Q1
Singles	900	585	350	190	105	60	1	30	20	1
Doubles	900	585	350	190	105	1	—	—	—	—

=== Prize money ===
Event	W	F	SF	QF	Round of 16	Round of 32	Round of 64	Q2	Q1
Singles	$471,700	$235,520	$117,770	$54,230	$26,900	$13,790	$7,090	$3,955	$2,040
Doubles	$135,000	$68,200	$33,635	$16,990	$8,600	$4,255	—	—	—

== Singles main-draw entrants ==
=== Seeds ===
Country	Player	Ranking	Seeds
GER	Angelique Kerber	1	1
ESP	Garbiñe Muguruza	3	2
POL	Agnieszka Radwańska	4	3
ROU	Simona Halep	5	4
CZE	Karolína Plíšková	6	5
USA	Venus Williams	7	6
ESP	Carla Suárez Navarro	8	7
USA	Madison Keys	9	8
RUS	Svetlana Kuznetsova	10	9
SVK	Dominika Cibulková	12	10
GBR	Johanna Konta	13	11
SUI	Timea Bacsinszky	14	12
ITA	Roberta Vinci	15	13
CZE	Petra Kvitová	16	14
RUS	Anastasia Pavlyuchenkova	17	15
AUS	Samantha Stosur	18	16

- Rankings are as of September 19, 2016

=== Other entrants ===
The following players received wild cards into the main singles draw:

- (Germany) Sabine Lisicki
- (China) Peng Shuai
- (China) Zheng Saisai

The following players received entry from the singles qualifying draw:

- (United States) Louisa Chirico
- (France) Alizé Cornet
- (Germany) Julia Görges
- (Russia) Daria Kasatkina
- (Russia) Elizaveta Kulichkova
- (United States) Bethanie Mattek-Sands
- (Czech Republic) Kateřina Siniaková
- (United Kingdom) Heather Watson

=== Withdrawals ===
Before the tournament

- (Netherlands) Kiki Bertens → replaced by (Kazakhstan) Yaroslava Shvedova
- (Canada) Eugenie Bouchard → replaced by (United States) Shelby Rogers
- (Germany) Anna-Lena Friedsam → replaced by (Australia) Daria Gavrilova
- (Serbia) Ana Ivanovic → replaced by (China) Zhang Shuai
- (Germany) Andrea Petkovic → replaced by (Latvia) Anastasija Sevastova
- (United States) Sloane Stephens → replaced by (United States) Madison Brengle
- (Russia) Elena Vesnina → replaced by (Denmark) Caroline Wozniacki
- (United States) Serena Williams → replaced by (Croatia) Mirjana Lučić-Baroni

=== Retirements ===
- (Switzerland) Timea Bacsinszky (Viral illness)
- (Romania) Irina-Camelia Begu (Rib injury)
- (Switzerland) Belinda Bencic (Low back injury)
- (Russia) Anastasia Pavlyuchenkova (Viral illness)
- (Latvia) Anastasija Sevastova (Right shoulder injury)
- (United Kingdom) Heather Watson (Gastrointestinal illness)

== Doubles main-draw entrants ==
=== Seeds ===
Country	Player	Country	Player	Rank^{1}	Seed
FRA	Caroline Garcia	FRA	Kristina Mladenovic	7	1
TPE	Chan Hao-Ching	TPE	Chan Yung-jan	14	2
IND	Sania Mirza	CZE	Barbora Strýcová	19	3
SUI	Martina Hingis	USA	CoCo Vandeweghe	21	4
USA	Bethanie Mattek-Sands	CZE	Lucie Šafářová	22	5
HUN	Tímea Babos	KAZ	Yaroslava Shvedova	23	6
CZE	Andrea Hlaváčková	CZE	Lucie Hradecká	23	7
GER	Julia Görges	CZE	Karolína Plíšková	29	8

- Rankings are as of September 19, 2016

=== Other entrants ===
The following pair received wildcards into the doubles main draw:

- (Switzerland) Timea Bacsinszky / (Russia) Svetlana Kuznetsova
- (Romania) Simona Halep / (Latvia) Jeļena Ostapenko
- (China) Han Xinyun / (China) Zhu Lin
- (China) Liu Chang / (China) Zhang Kailin

The following pair received entry as alternates:

- (France) Alizé Cornet / (France) Pauline Parmentier

=== Withdrawals ===
Before the tournament

- (Romania) Irina-Camelia Begu

== Champions ==
=== Singles ===
- (Czech Republic) Petra Kvitová def. (Slovakia) Dominika Cibulková, 6–1, 6–1

=== Doubles ===
- (United States) Bethanie Mattek-Sands / (Czech Republic) Lucie Šafářová def. (India) Sania Mirza / (Czech Republic) Barbora Strýcová, 6–1, 6–4.
