= 2016 Porsche Tennis Grand Prix =

- Date: 18–24 April
- Edition: 39th
- Category: Premier
- Draw: 28S / 16D
- Prize money: $759,900
- Surface: Clay (indoor)
- Location: Stuttgart, Germany
- Venue: Porsche-Arena
- Attendance: 37,200

Champions

Singles
- (Germany) Angelique Kerber

Doubles
- (France) Caroline Garcia / (France) Kristina Mladenovic
- Porsche Tennis Grand Prix

The 2016 Porsche Tennis Grand Prix was a women's tennis tournament played on indoor clay courts. It was the 39th edition of the Porsche Tennis Grand Prix, and part of the Premier tournaments of the 2016 WTA Tour. It took place at the Porsche Arena in Stuttgart, Germany, from 18 April through 24 April 2016.

Besides the prize money the singles champion won a Porsche 718 Boxster S sports car.

== Finals ==
=== Singles ===
- (Germany) Angelique Kerber defeated (Germany) Laura Siegemund, 6–4, 6–0

=== Doubles ===
- (France) Caroline Garcia / (France) Kristina Mladenovic defeated (Switzerland) Martina Hingis / (India) Sania Mirza, 2–6, 6–1, [10–6]

== Points and prize money ==
=== Point distribution ===
Event	W	F	SF	QF	Round of 16	Round of 32	Q	Q3	Q2	Q1
Singles	470	305	185	100	55	1	25	18	13	1
Doubles	470	305	185	100	1	—N/a	—N/a	—N/a	—N/a	—N/a

=== Prize money ===
Event	W	F	SF	QF	Round of 16	Round of 32	Q3	Q2	Q1
Singles	€104,477	€55,792	€29,799	€16,018	€8,590	€5,451	€2,448	€1,301	€724
Doubles *	€32,680	€17,459	€9,541	€4,855	€2,637	—N/a	—N/a	—N/a	—N/a

_{* per team}

== Singles main draw entrants ==
=== Seeds ===
Country		Rank^{1}	Seed
POL	Agnieszka Radwańska	2	1
GER	Angelique Kerber	3	2
ESP	Garbiñe Muguruza	4	3
ROU	Simona Halep	6	4
CZE	Petra Kvitová	7	5
ITA	Roberta Vinci	8	6
ESP	Carla Suárez Navarro	11	7
CZE	Lucie Šafářová	15	8

- ^{1} Rankings are as of April 11, 2016.

=== Other entrants ===
The following players received wildcards into the main draw:

- (Germany) Anna-Lena Friedsam
- (Germany) Julia Görges

The following players received entry from the qualifying draw:

- (United States) Louisa Chirico
- (France) Océane Dodin
- (Germany) Laura Siegemund
- (Germany) Carina Witthöft

The following player received entry as a lucky loser:

- (Italy) Camila Giorgi

=== Withdrawals ===
Before the tournament

- (Switzerland) Belinda Bencic (back injury) → replaced by (France) Caroline Garcia
- (Italy) Sara Errani (right leg injury) → replaced by (Italy) Camila Giorgi
- (United States) Madison Keys → replaced by (Romania) Monica Niculescu
- (Russia) Svetlana Kuznetsova → replaced by (France) Alizé Cornet
- (Russia) Maria Sharapova (provisional suspension) → replaced by (Russia) Ekaterina Makarova

== Doubles main draw entrants ==
=== Seeds ===
Country	Player	Country	Player	Rank^{1}	Seed
SUI	Martina Hingis	IND	Sania Mirza	2	1
FRA	Caroline Garcia	FRA	Kristina Mladenovic	23	2
SLO	Andreja Klepač	SLO	Katarina Srebotnik	54	3
USA	Raquel Atawo	POL	Alicja Rosolska	78	4

- Rankings are as of April 11, 2016.

=== Other entrants ===
The following pairs received wildcards into the main draw:

- (Germany) Annika Beck / (Italy) Roberta Vinci
- (Germany) Anna-Lena Friedsam / (Germany) Andrea Petkovic
- (Germany) Sabine Lisicki / (Czech Republic) Lucie Šafářová

=== Withdrawals ===
During the tournament

- (Germany) Andrea Petkovic (lower back injury)
