= 2016 Aegon Classic Birmingham =

- Date: 13–19 June
- Edition: 35th
- Category: WTA Premier
- Draw: 32S / 16D
- Prize money: $846,000
- Surface: Grass
- Location: Birmingham, United Kingdom
- Venue: Edgbaston Priory Club

Champions

Singles
- (United States) Madison Keys

Doubles
- (Czech Republic) Karolína Plíšková / (Czech Republic) Barbora Strýcová
← 2015 ·	Birmingham Classic	· 2017 →

The 2016 Aegon Classic Birmingham was a women's tennis tournament played on outdoor grass courts. It was the 35th edition of the event, and a Premier tournament on the 2016 WTA Tour. It took place at the Edgbaston Priory Club in Birmingham, England, from 13 June until 19 June 2016. Seventh-seeded Madison Keys won the singles title.

== Points and prize money ==
=== Point distribution ===
Event	W	F	SF	QF	Round of 16	Round of 32	Q	Q2	Q1
Singles	470	305	185	100	55	1	25 / 18	13	1
Doubles	470	305	185	100	1	—	—	—	—

=== Prize money ===
Event	W	F	SF	QF	Round of 16	Round of 32	Q	Q2	Q1
Singles	$146,200	$77,850	$41,555	$22,310	$11,930	$5,735	$3,400	$1,815	$1,005
Doubles	$45,620	$24,340	$13,310	$6,780	$3,675	—	—	—	—

== Singles main draw entrants ==
=== Seeds ===
Country	Player	Rank^{1}	Seed
POL	Agnieszka Radwańska	3	1
GER	Angelique Kerber	4	2
~~ROU~~	~~Simona Halep~~	~~5~~	~~3~~
SUI	Belinda Bencic	8	4
CZE	Petra Kvitová	11	5
ESP	Carla Suárez Navarro	15	6
USA	Madison Keys	16	7
CZE	Karolína Plíšková	17	8
GBR	Johanna Konta	18	9

- ^{1}rankings as of June 6, 2016

=== Other entrants ===
The following players received wildcards into the main draw:

- (United Kingdom) Naomi Broady
- (Czech Republic) Petra Kvitová
- (United Kingdom) Tara Moore
- (Poland) Agnieszka Radwańska

The following players received entry from the qualifying draw:

- (United States) Christina McHale
- (Austria) Tamira Paszek
- (Bulgaria) Tsvetana Pironkova
- (Czech Republic) Kateřina Siniaková

The following player received entry as a lucky loser:

- (Poland) Magda Linette

=== Withdrawals ===
Before the tournament

- (Slovakia) Dominika Cibulková → replaced by (United Kingdom) Heather Watson
- (Romania) Simona Halep → replaced by (Poland) Magda Linette
- (Russia) Svetlana Kuznetsova → replaced by (Italy) Camila Giorgi

=== Retirements ===
- (Switzerland) Belinda Bencic (right thigh injury)

== Doubles main draw entrants ==
=== Seeds ===
Country	Player	Country	Player	Rank^{1}	Seed
TPE	Chan Hao-ching	TPE	Chan Yung-jan	11	1
IND	Sania Mirza	USA	Coco Vandeweghe	24	2
CZE	Andrea Hlaváčková	CZE	Lucie Šafářová	25	3
SLO	Andreja Klepač	SLO	Katarina Srebotnik	53	4

- ^{1} Rankings as of June 6, 2016.

=== Other entrants ===
The following pairs received wildcards into the doubles main draw:

- (Switzerland) Belinda Bencic / (Germany) Andrea Petkovic
- (United Kingdom) Naomi Broady / (United Kingdom) Heather Watson
- (United Kingdom) Johanna Konta / (Ukraine) Elina Svitolina

The following pair received entry as alternates:

- (Japan) Misaki Doi / (Japan) Kurumi Nara

=== Withdrawals ===
Before the tournament

- (Switzerland) Belinda Bencic (right thigh injury)

== Finals ==
=== Singles ===
- (United States) Madison Keys defeated (Czech Republic) Barbora Strýcová, 6–3, 6–4

=== Doubles ===
- (Czech Republic) Karolína Plíšková / (Czech Republic) Barbora Strýcová defeated (United States) Vania King / (Russia) Alla Kudryavtseva, 6–3, 7–6^{(7–1)}
