= 2016 Aegon International Eastbourne =

- Date: 19–25 June
- Edition: 42nd
- Category: WTA Premier
- Draw: 48S / 16D
- Prize money: $731,000
- Surface: Grass
- Location: Eastbourne, United Kingdom
- Venue: Devonshire Park LTC

Champions

Singles
- (Slovakia) Dominika Cibulková

Doubles
- (Croatia) Darija Jurak / (Australia) Anastasia Rodionova
- Aegon International Eastbourne

The 2016 Aegon International was a women's tennis tournament played on outdoor grass courts. It was the 42nd edition of the tournament, and a WTA Premier tournament on the 2016 WTA Tour. The event took place at the Devonshire Park Lawn Tennis Club in Eastbourne, United Kingdom from 19 June through 25 June 2016.

== Finals ==
=== Singles ===
- (Slovakia) Dominika Cibulková defeated (Czech Republic) Karolína Plíšková 7–5, 6–3

=== Doubles ===
- (Croatia) Darija Jurak / (Australia) Anastasia Rodionova defeated (Chinese Taipei) Chan Hao-ching / (Chinese Taipei) Chan Yung-jan 5–7, 7–6^{(7–4)}, [10–6]

== Points and prize money ==
=== Point distribution ===
Event	W	F	SF	QF	Round of 16	Round of 32	Round of 64	Q	Q2	Q1
Singles	470	305	185	100	55	30	1	25	13	1
Doubles	470	305	185	100	1	—N/a	—N/a	—N/a	—N/a	—N/a

=== Prize money ===
Event	W	F	SF	QF	Round of 16	Round of 32	Round of 64	Q2	Q1
Singles	$	$	$	$	$	$	$	$	
Doubles	$	$	$	$	$	—N/a	—N/a	—N/a	—N/a

== Singles main-draw entrants ==
=== Seeds ===
Country	Player	Rank^{1}	Seed
POL	Agnieszka Radwańska	3	1
ITA	Roberta Vinci	7	2
SUI	Belinda Bencic	8	3
SUI	Timea Bacsinszky	10	4
CZE	Petra Kvitová	11	5
RUS	Svetlana Kuznetsova	12	6
AUS	Samantha Stosur	14	7
ESP	Carla Suárez Navarro	15	8
~~USA~~	~~Madison Keys~~	~~16~~	~~9~~
CZE	Karolína Plíšková	17	10
GBR	Johanna Konta	19	11
SVK	Dominika Cibulková	21	12
ITA	Sara Errani	22	13
RUS	Anastasia Pavlyuchenkova	23	14
ROU	Irina-Camelia Begu	26	15
CZE	Lucie Šafářová	28	16

- ^{1} Rankings are as of 13 June 2016.

=== Other entrants ===
The following players received wildcards into the main draw:

- (United Kingdom) Naomi Broady
- (United Kingdom) Tara Moore

The following players received entry from the qualifying draw:

- (Ukraine) Kateryna Bondarenko
- (United States) Madison Brengle
- (Slovenia) Polona Hercog
- (Croatia) Ana Konjuh
- (United States) Varvara Lepchenko
- (Croatia) Mirjana Lučić-Baroni
- (Puerto Rico) Monica Puig
- (Belgium) Alison Van Uytvanck

The following players received entry as lucky losers:

- (Czech Republic) Denisa Allertová
- (Estonia) Anett Kontaveit
- (China) Zhang Shuai
- (China) Zheng Saisai

=== Withdrawals ===
Before the tournament

- (Germany) Annika Beck → replaced by (Hungary) Tímea Babos
- (United States) Madison Keys → replaced by (Estonia) Anett Kontaveit
- (Romania) Monica Niculescu → replaced by (Germany) Anna-Lena Friedsam
- (Germany) Laura Siegemund → replaced by (China) Zhang Shuai
- (United States) Sloane Stephens → replaced by (France) Alizé Cornet
- (Czech Republic) Barbora Strýcová → replaced by (Czech Republic) Denisa Allertová
- (United States) CoCo Vandeweghe → replaced by (China) Zheng Saisai

== Doubles main-draw entrants ==
=== Seeds ===
Country	Player	Country	Player	Rank^{1}	Seed
SUI	Martina Hingis	IND	Sania Mirza	2	1
TPE	Chan Hao-ching	TPE	Chan Yung-jan	11	2
RUS	Ekaterina Makarova	RUS	Elena Vesnina	19	3
HUN	Tímea Babos	KAZ	Yaroslava Shvedova	21	4

- ^{1} Rankings are as of 13 June 2016.

=== Other entrants ===
The following pairs received wildcards into the doubles main draw:

- (United Kingdom) Naomi Broady / (United Kingdom) Heather Watson
- (Russia) Svetlana Kuznetsova / (Italy) Roberta Vinci
- (Czech Republic) Lucie Šafářová / (Australia) Samantha Stosur
