= 2016 Italian Open (tennis) =

- Date: 9–15 May
- Edition: 73rd
- Category: Masters 1000; Premier 5
- Draw: 56S / 24D; 56S / 28D
- Prize money: €4,300,755 (men) €2,399,000 (women)
- Surface: Clay / outdoor
- Location: Rome, Italy
- Venue: Foro Italico

Champions

Men's singles
- (United Kingdom) Andy Murray

Women's singles
- (United States) Serena Williams

Men's doubles
- (United States) Bob Bryan / (United States) Mike Bryan

Women's doubles
- (Switzerland) Martina Hingis / (India) Sania Mirza
← 2015 ·	Italian Open	· 2017 →

The 2016 Italian Open (also known as the 2016 Rome Masters and sponsored title 2016 Internazionali BNL d'Italia) was a tennis tournament played on outdoor clay courts at the Foro Italico in Rome, Italy. It was the 73rd edition of the Italian Open and is classified as an ATP World Tour Masters 1000 event on the 2016 ATP World Tour and a Premier 5 event on the 2016 WTA Tour. It took place from 9 to 15 May 2016.

== Finals ==
=== Men's singles ===
- (United Kingdom) Andy Murray defeated (Serbia) Novak Djokovic, 6–3, 6–3

=== Women's singles ===
- (United States) Serena Williams defeated (United States) Madison Keys, 7–6^{(7–5)}, 6–3

=== Men's doubles ===
- (United States) Bob Bryan / (United States) Mike Bryan defeated (Canada) Vasek Pospisil / (United States) Jack Sock, 2–6, 6–3, [10–7]

=== Women's doubles ===
- (Switzerland) Martina Hingis / (India) Sania Mirza defeated (Russia) Ekaterina Makarova / (Russia) Elena Vesnina, 6–1, 6–7^{(5–7)}, [10–3]

== Points and prize money ==
=== Point distribution ===
Event	W	F	SF	QF	Round of 16	Round of 32	Round of 64	Q	Q2	Q1
Men's singles	1000	600	360	180	90	45	10	25	16	0
Men's doubles	1000	600	360	180	90	0	—	—	—	—
Women's singles	900	585	350	190	105	60	1	30	20	1
Women's doubles	900	585	350	190	105	1	—	—	—	—

=== Prize money ===
Event	W	F	SF	QF	Round of 16	Round of 32	Round of 64	Q2	Q1
Men's singles	€717,315	€351,715	€177,015	€90,010	€46,740	€24,640	€13,305	€3,065	€1,565
Women's singles	€432,100	€215,950	€107,860	€49,680	€24,630	€12,645	€6,500	€3,620	€1,860
Men's doubles	€222,150	€108,750	€54,550	€28,000	€14,470	€7,640	—	—	—
Women's doubles	€123,700	€62,470	€30,920	€15,565	€7,860	€3,895	—	—	—

== ATP main draw entrants ==
=== Singles ===
==== Seeds ====
Country	Player	Rank^{1}	Seed
SRB	Novak Djokovic	1	1
GBR	Andy Murray	2	2
SUI	Roger Federer	3	3
SUI	Stan Wawrinka	4	4
ESP	Rafael Nadal	5	5
JPN	Kei Nishikori	6	6
~~FRA~~	~~Jo-Wilfried Tsonga~~	~~7~~	~~7~~
CZE	Tomáš Berdych	8	8
ESP	David Ferrer	9	9
CAN	Milos Raonic	10	10
FRA	Richard Gasquet	12	11
BEL	David Goffin	13	12
AUT	Dominic Thiem	14	13
FRA	Gaël Monfils	15	14
ESP	Roberto Bautista Agut	17	15
RSA	Kevin Anderson	19	16

- Rankings are as of May 2, 2016.

==== Other entrants ====
The following players received wildcards into the main draw:

- (Italy) Salvatore Caruso
- (Italy) Marco Cecchinato
- (Italy) Paolo Lorenzi
- (Italy) Lorenzo Sonego

The following players received entry using a protected ranking into the main draw:

- (France) Julien Benneteau
- (Argentina) Juan Mónaco

The following players received entry from the qualifying draw:

- (United Kingdom) Aljaž Bedene
- (Spain) Íñigo Cervantes
- (Bosnia and Herzegovina) Damir Džumhur
- (Latvia) Ernests Gulbis
- (Kazakhstan) Mikhail Kukushkin
- (France) Stéphane Robert
- (Italy) Filippo Volandri

The following player received entry as a lucky loser:

- (France) Lucas Pouille

==== Withdrawals ====
Before the tournament

- (Cyprus) Marcos Baghdatis →replaced by (France) Nicolas Mahut
- (Croatia) Marin Čilić →replaced by (Italy) Andreas Seppi
- (Argentina) Juan Martín del Potro →replaced by (Canada) Vasek Pospisil
- (Germany) Tommy Haas →replaced by (Croatia) Borna Ćorić
- (United States) John Isner →replaced by (Argentina) Juan Mónaco
- (Slovakia) Martin Kližan →replaced by (Russia) Teymuraz Gabashvili
- (France) Gilles Simon →replaced by (Spain) Albert Ramos-Viñolas
- (France) Jo-Wilfried Tsonga (muscle strain) →replaced by (France) Lucas Pouille

During the tournament

- (Argentina) Juan Mónaco

=== Retirements ===
- (Australia) Bernard Tomic (influenza)

=== Doubles ===
==== Seeds ====
Country	Player	Country	Player	Rank^{1}	Seed
~~FRA~~	~~Pierre-Hugues Herbert~~	~~FRA~~	~~Nicolas Mahut~~	~~7~~	~~1~~
CRO	Ivan Dodig	BRA	Marcelo Melo	11	2
NED	Jean-Julien Rojer	ROU	Horia Tecău	11	3
GBR	Jamie Murray	BRA	Bruno Soares	11	4
USA	Bob Bryan	USA	Mike Bryan	15	5
IND	Rohan Bopanna	ROU	Florin Mergea	24	6
AUT	Alexander Peya	SRB	Nenad Zimonjić	40	7
CAN	Vasek Pospisil	USA	Jack Sock	42	8

- Rankings are as of May 2, 2016.

==== Other entrants ====
The following pairs received wildcards into the doubles main draw:

- (Italy) Andrea Arnaboldi / (Italy) Alessandro Giannessi
- (Italy) Fabio Fognini / (Italy) Andreas Seppi

The following pair received entry as alternates:

- (United Kingdom) Dominic Inglot / (France) Fabrice Martin

==== Withdrawals ====
Before the tournament

- (France) Pierre-Hugues Herbert (knee injury)

=== Retirements ===
- (South Africa) Kevin Anderson (muscle strain)

== WTA main draw entrants ==
=== Singles ===
==== Seeds ====
Country	Player	Rank^{1}	Seed
USA	Serena Williams	1	1
GER	Angelique Kerber	3	2
ESP	Garbiñe Muguruza	4	3
BLR	Victoria Azarenka	5	4
CZE	Petra Kvitová	6	5
ROU	Simona Halep	7	6
ITA	Roberta Vinci	8	7
ESP	Carla Suárez Navarro	11	8
RUS	Svetlana Kuznetsova	12	9
CZE	Lucie Šafářová	13	10
SUI	Timea Bacsinszky	15	11
USA	Venus Williams	16	12
SRB	Ana Ivanovic	17	13
ITA	Sara Errani	18	14
UKR	Elina Svitolina	19	15
CZE	Karolína Plíšková	20	16

- Rankings are as of May 2, 2016.

==== Other entrants ====
The following players received wildcards into the main draw:

- (Italy) Claudia Giovine
- (Italy) Karin Knapp
- (Italy) Francesca Schiavone

The following players received entry from the qualifying draw:

- (Netherlands) Kiki Bertens
- (Colombia) Mariana Duque Mariño
- (Germany) Julia Görges
- (Sweden) Johanna Larsson
- (United States) Christina McHale
- (Puerto Rico) Monica Puig
- (United States) Alison Riske
- (United Kingdom) Heather Watson

==== Withdrawals ====
Before the tournament

- (Switzerland) Belinda Bencic (lower back injury) → replaced by (Brazil) Teliana Pereira
- (Italy) Camila Giorgi (back injury) → replaced by (France) Caroline Garcia
- (United States) Sloane Stephens → replaced by (Hungary) Tímea Babos
- (Denmark) Caroline Wozniacki (right ankle injury) → replaced by (Belgium) Yanina Wickmayer

=== Doubles ===
==== Seeds ====
Country	Player	Country	Player	Rank^{1}	Seed
SUI	Martina Hingis	IND	Sania Mirza	2	1
USA	Bethanie Mattek-Sands	CZE	Lucie Šafářová	8	2
HUN	Tímea Babos	KAZ	Yaroslava Shvedova	16	3
CZE	Andrea Hlaváčková	CZE	Lucie Hradecká	21	4
FRA	Caroline Garcia	FRA	Kristina Mladenovic	22	5
TPE	Chan Yung-jan	GER	Anna-Lena Grönefeld	34	6
RUS	Ekaterina Makarova	RUS	Elena Vesnina	39	7
GER	Julia Görges	CZE	Karolína Plíšková	40	8

- Rankings are as of May 2, 2016.

==== Other entrants ====
The following pairs received wildcards into the doubles main draw:

- (Italy) Claudia Giovine / (Italy) Angelica Moratelli
- (Italy) Karin Knapp / (Italy) Francesca Schiavone
- (Russia) Svetlana Kuznetsova / (Russia) Anastasia Pavlyuchenkova
- (United States) Serena Williams / (United States) Venus Williams
