= 2016 Qatar Total Open =

- Date: 21–27 February
- Edition: 14th
- Category: WTA Premier 5
- Draw: 56S / 26D
- Prize money: $2,818,000
- Surface: Hard
- Location: Doha, Qatar
- Venue: Khalifa International Tennis and Squash Complex

Champions

Singles
- (Spain) Carla Suárez Navarro

Doubles
- (Chinese Taipei) Chan Hao-ching / (Chinese Taipei) Chan Yung-jan
← 2015 ·	Qatar Total Open	· 2017 →

The 2016 Qatar Total Open was a professional women's tennis tournament played on hard courts. It was the 14th edition of the event and part of the WTA Premier 5 series of the 2016 WTA Tour. It took place at the International Tennis and Squash complex in Doha, Qatar between 21 and 27 February 2016.

== Points and prize money ==
=== Point distribution ===
Event	W	F	SF	QF	Round of 16	Round of 32	Round of 64	Q	Q2	Q1
Singles	900	585	350	190	105	60	1	30	20	1
Doubles	900	585	350	190	105	1	—	—	—	—

=== Prize money ===
Event	W	F	SF	QF	Round of 16	Round of 32	Round of 64	Q2	Q1
Singles	$518,500	$259,300	$129,520	$59,730	$29,580	$15,185	$7,800	$4,340	$2,230
Doubles *	$148,300	$75,010	$37,130	$18,700	$9,470	$4,680	—	—	—

_{* per team}

== Singles main-draw entrants ==
=== Seeds ===
Country	Player	Rank^{1}	Seed
GER	Angelique Kerber	2	1
ROU	Simona Halep	3	2
POL	Agnieszka Radwańska	4	3
ESP	Garbiñe Muguruza	5	4
CZE	Petra Kvitová	8	5
SUI	Belinda Bencic	9	6
CZE	Lucie Šafářová	10	7
ESP	Carla Suárez Navarro	11	8
ITA	Roberta Vinci	13	9
CZE	Karolína Plíšková	14	10
SUI	Timea Bacsinszky	16	11
RUS	Svetlana Kuznetsova	18	12
DEN	Caroline Wozniacki	19	13
SRB	Jelena Janković	20	14
UKR	Elina Svitolina	21	15
ITA	Sara Errani	22	16

- ^{1} Rankings as of February 15, 2016.

=== Other entrants ===
The following players received wildcards into the singles main draw:

- (Oman) Fatma Al-Nabhani
- (Canada) Eugenie Bouchard
- (Turkey) Çağla Büyükakçay

The following players received entry from the qualifying draw:

- (Ukraine) Kateryna Bondarenko
- (Slovakia) Jana Čepelová
- (Belgium) Kirsten Flipkens
- (Croatia) Ana Konjuh
- (Latvia) Anastasija Sevastova
- (Croatia) Donna Vekić
- (Russia) Elena Vesnina
- (China) Wang Qiang

=== Withdrawals ===
Before the tournament

- (Germany) Mona Barthel → replaced by (Russia) Daria Kasatkina
- (Romania) Irina-Camelia Begu → replaced by (Japan) Misaki Doi
- (France) Alizé Cornet → replaced by (China) Zheng Saisai
- (Italy) Camila Giorgi → replaced by (Kazakhstan) Yaroslava Shvedova
- (China) Peng Shuai (right hand injury) → replaced by (Bulgaria) Tsvetana Pironkova
- (Russia) Maria Sharapova (forearm injury) → replaced by (United States) Bethanie Mattek-Sands
- (United States) Serena Williams (flu) → replaced by (Czech Republic) Denisa Allertová

=== Retirements ===
- (Germany) Andrea Petkovic (left thigh injury)

== Doubles main-draw entrants ==
=== Seeds ===
Country	Player	Country	Player	Rank^{1}	Seed
SUI	Martina Hingis	IND	Sania Mirza	2	1
USA	Bethanie Mattek-Sands	KAZ	Yaroslava Shvedova	10	2
FRA	Caroline Garcia	FRA	Kristina Mladenovic	20	3
TPE	Chan Hao-ching	TPE	Chan Yung-jan	21	4
CZE	Andrea Hlaváčková	CZE	Lucie Hradecká	22	5
HUN	Tímea Babos	GER	Julia Görges	36	6
USA	Raquel Atawo	USA	Abigail Spears	39	7
SLO	Andreja Klepač	SLO	Katarina Srebotnik	49	8

- ^{1} Rankings as of February 15, 2016.

=== Other entrants ===
The following pairs received wildcards into the doubles main draw:

- (Oman) Fatma Al-Nabhani / (United States) Varvara Lepchenko
- (Romania) Simona Halep / (Romania) Raluca Olaru
- (Czech Republic) Petra Kvitová / (Czech Republic) Barbora Strýcová
- (Tunisia) Ons Jabeur / (Qatar) Olla Mourad

=== Withdrawals ===
During the tournament

- (Czech Republic) Petra Kvitová (right leg injury)

== Champions ==
=== Singles ===
- (Spain) Carla Suárez Navarro def. (Latvia) Jeļena Ostapenko, 1–6, 6–4, 6–4

=== Doubles ===
- (Chinese Taipei) Chan Hao-ching / (Chinese Taipei) Chan Yung-jan def. (Italy) Sara Errani / (Spain) Carla Suárez Navarro, 6–3, 6–3
