= 2016 J&T Banka Prague Open =

- Date: 25 – 30 April
- Edition: 7th
- Category: WTA International
- Draw: 32S / 16D
- Prize money: $500,000
- Surface: Clay
- Location: Prague, Czech Republic
- Venue: TK Sparta Prague

Champions

Singles
- (Czech Republic) Lucie Šafářová

Doubles
- (Russia) Margarita Gasparyan / (Czech Republic) Andrea Hlaváčková
- J&T Banka Prague Open

The 2016 J&T Banka Prague Open was a professional tennis tournament played on outdoor clay courts. It was the seventh edition of the tournament, and its second as part of the International category of the 2016 WTA Tour. It took place at the TK Sparta Prague in Prague, Czech Republic, from 25 to 30 April 2016. Following Roberta Vinci's withdrawal due to an ankle injury, Svetlana Kuznetsova was the top-seeded player at the tournament.

== Finals ==
=== Singles ===
- (Czech Republic) Lucie Šafářová defeated (Australia) Samantha Stosur, 3–6, 6–1, 6–4

=== Doubles ===
- (Russia) Margarita Gasparyan / (Czech Republic) Andrea Hlaváčková defeated (Argentina) María Irigoyen / (Poland) Paula Kania, 6–4, 6–2

== Points distribution ==
Event	W	F	SF	QF	Round of 16	Round of 32	Q	Q3	Q2	Q1
Singles	280	180	110	60	30	1	18	14	10	1
Doubles	280	180	110	60	1	—N/a	—N/a	—N/a	—N/a	—N/a

== Singles main draw entrants ==
=== Seeds ===
Country	Player	Rank^{1}	Seed
RUS	Svetlana Kuznetsova	13	1
CZE	Lucie Šafářová	15	2
CZE	Karolína Plíšková	18	3
AUS	Samantha Stosur	26	4
CZE	Barbora Strýcová	33	5
LAT	Jeļena Ostapenko	37	6
SVK	Dominika Cibulková	38	7
BEL	Yanina Wickmayer	42	8

- ^{1} Rankings as of 18 April 2016.

=== Other entrants ===
The following players received wildcards into the singles main draw:

- (Slovakia) Jana Čepelová
- (Czech Republic) Kateřina Siniaková
- (Czech Republic) Markéta Vondroušová

The following player received entry as a special exempt:

- (Switzerland) Stefanie Vögele

The following players received entry from the qualifying draw:

- (Romania) Sorana Cîrstea
- (France) Océane Dodin
- (United States) Vania King
- (France) Virginie Razzano

The following players received entry as lucky losers:

- (Czech Republic) Andrea Hlaváčková
- (Czech Republic) Barbora Krejčíková
- (Czech Republic) Tereza Smitková

=== Withdrawals ===
Before the tournament

- (Czech Republic) Denisa Allertová → replaced by (Czech Republic) Barbora Krejčíková
- (Germany) Mona Barthel → replaced by (Croatia) Ana Konjuh
- (Serbia) Jelena Janković → replaced by (United Kingdom) Naomi Broady
- (Russia) Daria Kasatkina → replaced by (Chinese Taipei) Hsieh Su-wei
- (Estonia) Anett Kontaveit → replaced by (Czech Republic) Tereza Smitková
- (Montenegro) Danka Kovinić → replaced by (Czech Republic) Andrea Hlaváčková
- (United States) Christina McHale → replaced by (Czech Republic) Lucie Hradecká
- (United Kingdom) Heather Watson → replaced by (Belarus) Olga Govortsova
- (Italy) Roberta Vinci → replaced by (Czech Republic) Kristýna Plíšková

=== Withdrawals ===
During the tournament

- (Russia) Svetlana Kuznetsova

=== Retirements ===
- (Czech Republic) Lucie Hradecká

== Doubles main draw entrants ==
=== Seeds ===
Country	Player	Country	Player	Rank^{1}	Seed
USA	Raquel Atawo	USA	Abigail Spears	43	1
RUS	Margarita Gasparyan	CZE	Andrea Hlaváčková	54	2
TPE	Chuang Chia-jung	CRO	Darija Jurak	84	3
CHN	Liang Chen	POL	Alicja Rosolska	97	4

- ^{1} Rankings as of 18 April 2016.

=== Other entrants ===
The following pairs received wildcards into the main draw:

- (Slovakia) Jana Čepelová / (Slovakia) Viktória Kužmová
- (Czech Republic) Tereza Smitková / (Czech Republic) Barbora Štefková
