= 2016 Angelique Kerber tennis season =

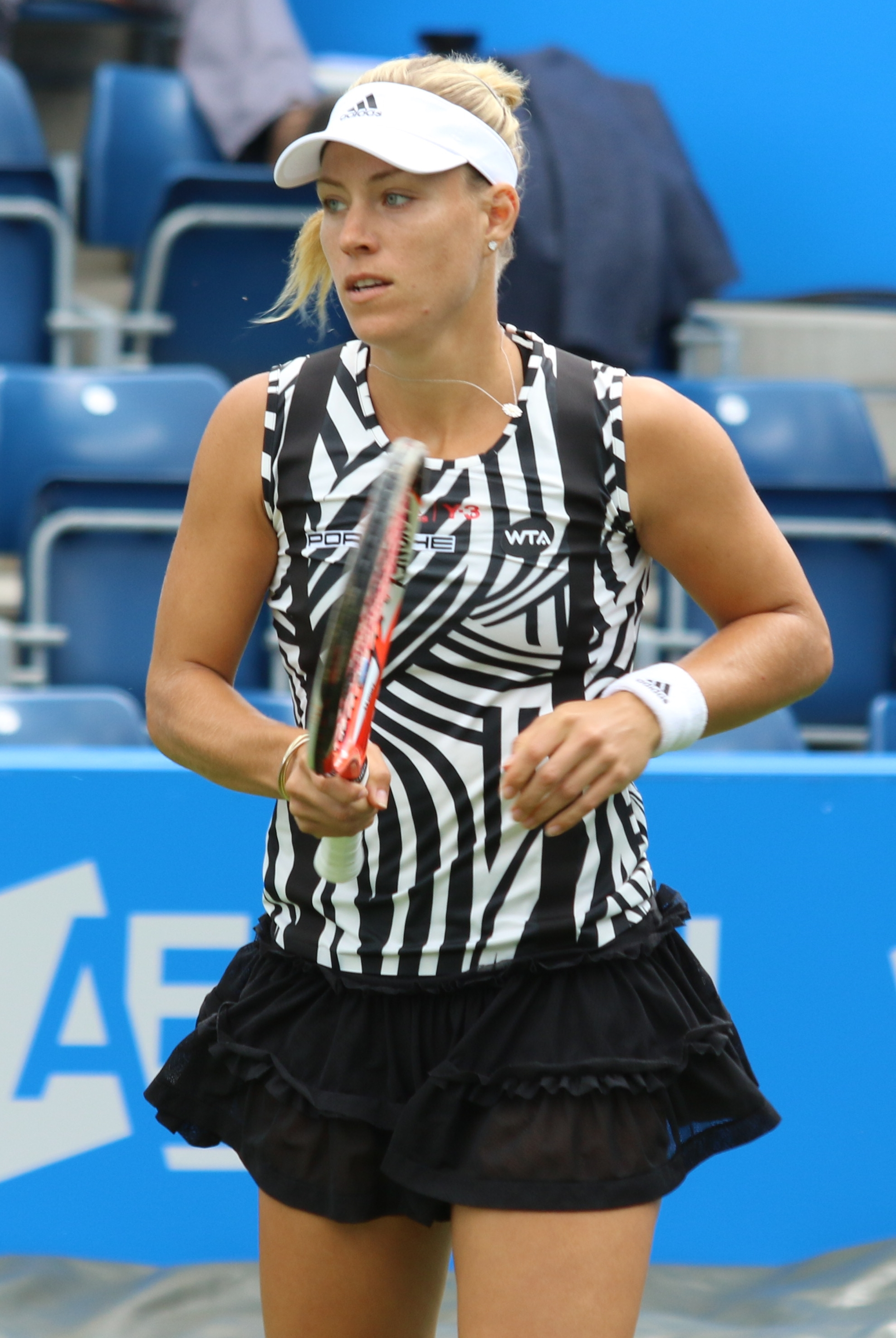
- Kerber playing at the 2016 Birmingham Classic.
- Full name: Angelique Kerber
- Country: Germany
- Calendar prize money: $9,861,615 (singles & doubles)

Singles
- Season record: 63–18
- Calendar titles: 3
- Year-end ranking: No. 1
- Ranking change from previous year: ▲9

Grand Slam & significant results
- Australian Open: W
- French Open: 1R
- Wimbledon: F
- US Open: W
- Other tournaments
- Championships: F

Doubles
- Season record: 3–4
- Calendar titles: 0
- Current ranking: No. 217
- Ranking change from previous year: ▲190

Fed Cup
- Fed Cup: 1R
- Last updated on: 31 October 2016.

The 2016 Angelique Kerber tennis season officially began on 5 January with the start of the 2016 Brisbane International. Kerber entered the season as the number 10 ranked player and the defending champion at four tournaments.

== Year in detail ==
=== Australian Open Series ===
==== Australian Open ====
Kerber entered the 2016 Australian Open as the seventh seed. She saved a match point in the second set against Misaki Doi in the first round before defeating her in three sets to advance to the second round. Following this tight encounter, Kerber defeated Alexandra Dulgheru, Madison Brengle, and compatriot Annika Beck all in comprehensive straight sets to advance to the quarterfinals, her first in Melbourne, where she faced her nemesis Victoria Azarenka, in a rematch of their encounter in Brisbane. With new tactics, Kerber assailed to a lead by two breaks in the first set. Azarenka then fought her way back into the set, but Kerber maintained a one-break lead to close out the set. In the second set, Azarenka resumed her comeback and served for the set twice, but Kerber broke Azarenka both times and had to save four set points in the process too. She ultimately took the match, thus beating Azarenka for the first time in her career, and advanced to her third career Grand Slam semifinal, the most recent one having come in Wimbledon back in 2012.

In the semifinals, Kerber faced the unseeded Johanna Konta and saw off the Briton in straight sets to book a spot in her maiden Grand Slam final, a meeting against world No. 1 and defending champion Serena Williams, who had been in dominant form. There, Kerber surprised Williams in a spectacular match where she was the underdog, and defeated Williams, 4–6, 6–3, 4–6, also stopping Williams from equaling the Open Era record held by Steffi Graf.

With the title, Kerber became the first major champion to save a match point in the first round. She was also the first German of any gender to win a major since Graf at the 1999 French Open. Kerber's victory catapulted her ranking to No.2 for the first time in her career.

== All matches ==
Key
W	F	SF	QF	#R	RR	Q#	P#	DNQ	A	Z#	PO	G	S	B	NMS	NTI	P	NH

(W) winner; (F) finalist; (SF) semifinalist; (QF) quarterfinalist; (#R) rounds 4, 3, 2, 1; (RR) round-robin stage; (Q#) qualification round; (P#) preliminary round; (DNQ) did not qualify; (A) absent; (Z#) Davis/Fed Cup Zonal Group (with number indication) or (PO) play-off; (G) gold, (S) silver or (B) bronze Olympic/Paralympic medal; (NMS) not a Masters tournament; (NTI) not a Tier I tournament; (P) postponed; (NH) not held; (SR) strike rate (events won / competed); (W–L) win–loss record.
To avoid confusion and double counting, these charts are updated at the conclusion of a tournament or when the player's participation has ended.

=== Singles matches ===
Tournament	Match	Round	Opponent (Seed or Key)	Rank	Result	Score
Brisbane International; Brisbane, Australia; Premier; Hard, outdoor 4 – 9 January 2016
Brisbane International; Brisbane, Australia; Premier; Hard, outdoor 4 – 9 January 2016	1	1R	(Italy) Camila Giorgi	35	Win	5–7, 6–3, 6–0
Brisbane International; Brisbane, Australia; Premier; Hard, outdoor 4 – 9 January 2016	2	2R	(United States) Madison Brengle	40	Win	6–3, 6–3
Brisbane International; Brisbane, Australia; Premier; Hard, outdoor 4 – 9 January 2016	3	QF	(Russia) Anastasia Pavlyuchenkova	28	Win	6–4, 6–4
Brisbane International; Brisbane, Australia; Premier; Hard, outdoor 4 – 9 January 2016	4	SF	(Spain) Carla Suárez Navarro (6)	13	Win	6–2, 6–3
Brisbane International; Brisbane, Australia; Premier; Hard, outdoor 4 – 9 January 2016	5	F	(Belarus) Victoria Azarenka	22	Loss (1)	3–6, 1–6
Sydney International; Sydney, Australia; Premier; Hard, outdoor 11 – 16 January 2016
Sydney International; Sydney, Australia; Premier; Hard, outdoor 11 – 16 January 2016	6	1R	(Ukraine) Elina Svitolina	20	Win	4–6, 6–0, 6–3
Sydney International; Sydney, Australia; Premier; Hard, outdoor 11 – 16 January 2016	–	2R	(Russia) Ekaterina Makarova	23	Withdrew	N/A
Australian Open; Melbourne, Australia; Grand Slam; Hard, outdoor 18 – 31 January 2016
Australian Open; Melbourne, Australia; Grand Slam; Hard, outdoor 18 – 31 January 2016	7	1R	(Japan) Misaki Doi	64	Win	6–7^{(4–7)}, 7–6^{(8–6)}, 6–3
Australian Open; Melbourne, Australia; Grand Slam; Hard, outdoor 18 – 31 January 2016	8	2R	(Romania) Alexandra Dulgheru	61	Win	6–2, 6–4
Australian Open; Melbourne, Australia; Grand Slam; Hard, outdoor 18 – 31 January 2016	9	3R	(United States) Madison Brengle	49	Win	6–1, 6–3
Australian Open; Melbourne, Australia; Grand Slam; Hard, outdoor 18 – 31 January 2016	10	4R	(Germany) Annika Beck	55	Win	6–4, 6–0
Australian Open; Melbourne, Australia; Grand Slam; Hard, outdoor 18 – 31 January 2016	11	QF	(Belarus) Victoria Azarenka (14)	16	Win	6–3, 7–5
Australian Open; Melbourne, Australia; Grand Slam; Hard, outdoor 18 – 31 January 2016	12	SF	(United Kingdom) Johanna Konta	47	Win	7–5, 6–2
Australian Open; Melbourne, Australia; Grand Slam; Hard, outdoor 18 – 31 January 2016	13	W	(United States) Serena Williams (1)	1	Win	6–4, 3–6, 6–4
Fed Cup World Group First Round; Leipzig, Germany; Fed Cup; Hard, indoor 6 – 7 February 2016
Fed Cup World Group First Round; Leipzig, Germany; Fed Cup; Hard, indoor 6 – 7 February 2016	14	1R; R2	(Switzerland) Timea Bacsinszky	15	Win	6–1, 6–3
Fed Cup World Group First Round; Leipzig, Germany; Fed Cup; Hard, indoor 6 – 7 February 2016	15	1R; R3	(Switzerland) Belinda Bencic	11	Loss	6–7^{(5–7)}, 3–6
Qatar Open; Doha, Qatar; Premier 5 Hard, outdoor 21 – 27 February 2016
Qatar Open; Doha, Qatar; Premier 5 Hard, outdoor 21 – 27 February 2016	–	1R	Bye			
Qatar Open; Doha, Qatar; Premier 5 Hard, outdoor 21 – 27 February 2016	16	2R	(China) Zheng Saisai	73	Loss	5–7, 1–6
Indian Wells Masters; Indian Wells, United States; Premier Mandatory; Hard, outdoor 7 – 20 March 2016
Indian Wells Masters; Indian Wells, United States; Premier Mandatory; Hard, outdoor 7 – 20 March 2016	–	1R	Bye			
Indian Wells Masters; Indian Wells, United States; Premier Mandatory; Hard, outdoor 7 – 20 March 2016	17	2R	(Czech Republic) Denisa Allertová	64	Loss	5–7, 5–7
Miami Open; Miami, United States; Premier Mandatory; Hard, outdoor 21 March – 3 April 2016
Miami Open; Miami, United States; Premier Mandatory; Hard, outdoor 21 March – 3 April 2016	–	1R	Bye			
Miami Open; Miami, United States; Premier Mandatory; Hard, outdoor 21 March – 3 April 2016	18	2R	(Czech Republic) Barbora Strýcová	32	Win	6–1, 6–1
Miami Open; Miami, United States; Premier Mandatory; Hard, outdoor 21 March – 3 April 2016	19	3R	(Netherlands) Kiki Bertens (Q)	108	Win	1–6, 6–2, 3–0 ret.
Miami Open; Miami, United States; Premier Mandatory; Hard, outdoor 21 March – 3 April 2016	20	4R	(Hungary) Tímea Babos	49	Win	6–2, 3–6, 6–4
Miami Open; Miami, United States; Premier Mandatory; Hard, outdoor 21 March – 3 April 2016	21	QF	(United States) Madison Keys (22)	24	Win	6–3, 6–2
Miami Open; Miami, United States; Premier Mandatory; Hard, outdoor 21 March – 3 April 2016	22	SF	(Belarus) Victoria Azarenka (13)	8	Loss	2–6, 5–7
Charleston Open; Charleston, United States; Premier; Clay, outdoor 4 – 10 April 2016
Charleston Open; Charleston, United States; Premier; Clay, outdoor 4 – 10 April 2016	–	1R	Bye			
Charleston Open; Charleston, United States; Premier; Clay, outdoor 4 – 10 April 2016	23	2R	(Spain) Lara Arruabarrena	80	Win	6–2, 5–7, 7–6^{(7–3)}
Charleston Open; Charleston, United States; Premier; Clay, outdoor 4 – 10 April 2016	24	3R	(Slovakia) Kristína Kučová (Q)	142	Win	6–2, 6–3
Charleston Open; Charleston, United States; Premier; Clay, outdoor 4 – 10 April 2016	25	QF	(Romania) Irina-Camelia Begu (13)	34	Win	6–2, 6–3
Charleston Open; Charleston, United States; Premier; Clay, outdoor 4 – 10 April 2016	26	SF	(United States) Sloane Stephens (7)	25	Loss	1–6, 0–3 ret.
Fed Cup World Group play-offs Cluj-Napoca, Romania; Fed Cup; Clay, indoor 16 – 17 April 2016
Fed Cup World Group play-offs Cluj-Napoca, Romania; Fed Cup; Clay, indoor 16 – 17 April 2016	27	PO; R1	(Romania) Irina-Camelia Begu	35	Win	6–2, 6–3
Fed Cup World Group play-offs Cluj-Napoca, Romania; Fed Cup; Clay, indoor 16 – 17 April 2016	28	PO; R3	(Romania) Simona Halep	6	Win	6–2, 6–2
Stuttgart Open; Stuttgart, Germany; Premier; Clay, indoor 18 – 24 April 2016
Stuttgart Open; Stuttgart, Germany; Premier; Clay, indoor 18 – 24 April 2016	–	1R	Bye			
Stuttgart Open; Stuttgart, Germany; Premier; Clay, indoor 18 – 24 April 2016	29	2R	(Germany) Annika Beck	41	Win	4–6, 6–3, 6–1
Stuttgart Open; Stuttgart, Germany; Premier; Clay, indoor 18 – 24 April 2016	30	QF	(Spain) Carla Suárez Navarro (7)	11	Win	6–2, 6–4
Stuttgart Open; Stuttgart, Germany; Premier; Clay, indoor 18 – 24 April 2016	31	SF	(Czech Republic) Petra Kvitová (5)	7	Win	6–4, 4–6, 6–2
Stuttgart Open; Stuttgart, Germany; Premier; Clay, indoor 18 – 24 April 2016	32	W	(Germany) Laura Siegemund (Q)	71	Win (2)	6–4, 6–0
Madrid Open; Madrid, Spain; Premier Mandatory; Clay, outdoor 1 – 8 May 2016
Madrid Open; Madrid, Spain; Premier Mandatory; Clay, outdoor 1 – 8 May 2016	33	1R	(Czech Republic) Barbora Strýcová	33	Loss	4–6, 2–6
Italian Open; Rome, Italy; Premier 5 Clay, outdoor 9 – 15 May 2016
Italian Open; Rome, Italy; Premier 5 Clay, outdoor 9 – 15 May 2016	–	1R	Bye			
Italian Open; Rome, Italy; Premier 5 Clay, outdoor 9 – 15 May 2016	34	2R	(Canada) Eugenie Bouchard	46	Loss	1–6, 7–5, 5–7
French Open; Paris, France; Grand Slam; Clay, outdoor 23 May – 5 June 2016
French Open; Paris, France; Grand Slam; Clay, outdoor 23 May – 5 June 2016	35	1R	(Netherlands) Kiki Bertens	58	Loss	2–6, 6–3, 3–6
Birmingham Classic; Birmingham, United Kingdom; Premier; Grass, outdoor 13 – 19 June 2016
Birmingham Classic; Birmingham, United Kingdom; Premier; Grass, outdoor 13 – 19 June 2016	36	1R	(China) Peng Shuai (PR)	266	Win	7–6^{(7–3)}, 6–3
Birmingham Classic; Birmingham, United Kingdom; Premier; Grass, outdoor 13 – 19 June 2016	37	2R	(Australia) Daria Gavrilova	50	Win	5–7, 6–2, 6–2
Birmingham Classic; Birmingham, United Kingdom; Premier; Grass, outdoor 13 – 19 June 2016	38	QF	(Spain) Carla Suárez Navarro (6)	15	Loss	4–6, 6–1, 5–7
Wimbledon Championships; London, United Kingdom; Grand Slam; Grass, outdoor 27 June – 10 July 2016
Wimbledon Championships; London, United Kingdom; Grand Slam; Grass, outdoor 27 June – 10 July 2016	39	1R	(United Kingdom) Laura Robson (WC)	283	Win	6–2, 6–2
Wimbledon Championships; London, United Kingdom; Grand Slam; Grass, outdoor 27 June – 10 July 2016	40	2R	(United States) Varvara Lepchenko	64	Win	6–4, 6–1
Wimbledon Championships; London, United Kingdom; Grand Slam; Grass, outdoor 27 June – 10 July 2016	41	3R	(Germany) Carina Witthöft	109	Win	7–6^{(13–11)}, 6–1
Wimbledon Championships; London, United Kingdom; Grand Slam; Grass, outdoor 27 June – 10 July 2016	42	4R	(Japan) Misaki Doi	49	Win	6–3, 6–1
Wimbledon Championships; London, United Kingdom; Grand Slam; Grass, outdoor 27 June – 10 July 2016	43	QF	(Romania) Simona Halep (5)	5	Win	7–5, 7–6^{(7–2)}
Wimbledon Championships; London, United Kingdom; Grand Slam; Grass, outdoor 27 June – 10 July 2016	44	SF	(United States) Venus Williams (8)	8	Win	6–4, 6–4
Wimbledon Championships; London, United Kingdom; Grand Slam; Grass, outdoor 27 June – 10 July 2016	45	F	(United States) Serena Williams (1)	1	Loss (2)	5–7, 3–6
Swedish Open; Båstad, Sweden; International; Clay, outdoor 18 – 24 July 2016
Swedish Open; Båstad, Sweden; International; Clay, outdoor 18 – 24 July 2016	46	1R	(Sweden) Cornelia Lister (WC)	664	Win	2–6, 6–4, 6–2
Swedish Open; Båstad, Sweden; International; Clay, outdoor 18 – 24 July 2016	–	2R	(Spain) Lara Arruabarrena	98	Withdrew	N/A
Canadian Open; Montreal, Canada; Premier 5 Hard, outdoor 25 – 31 July 2016
Canadian Open; Montreal, Canada; Premier 5 Hard, outdoor 25 – 31 July 2016	–	1R	Bye			
Canadian Open; Montreal, Canada; Premier 5 Hard, outdoor 25 – 31 July 2016	47	2R	(Croatia) Mirjana Lučić-Baroni	55	Win	6–3, 4–6, 6–3
Canadian Open; Montreal, Canada; Premier 5 Hard, outdoor 25 – 31 July 2016	48	3R	(Ukraine) Elina Svitolina (17)	20	Win	1–6, 7–6^{(7–2)}, 6–4
Canadian Open; Montreal, Canada; Premier 5 Hard, outdoor 25 – 31 July 2016	49	QF	(Russia) Daria Kasatkina	33	Win	6–2, 6–2
Canadian Open; Montreal, Canada; Premier 5 Hard, outdoor 25 – 31 July 2016	50	SF	(Romania) Simona Halep (5)	5	Loss	0–6, 6–3, 2–6
Summer Olympics; Rio de Janeiro, Brazil; Olympic Games; Hard, outdoor 6 – 14 August 2016
Summer Olympics; Rio de Janeiro, Brazil; Olympic Games; Hard, outdoor 6 – 14 August 2016	51	1R	(Colombia) Mariana Duque Mariño (IP)	80	Win	6–3, 7–5
Summer Olympics; Rio de Janeiro, Brazil; Olympic Games; Hard, outdoor 6 – 14 August 2016	52	2R	(Canada) Eugenie Bouchard	40	Win	6–4, 6–2
Summer Olympics; Rio de Janeiro, Brazil; Olympic Games; Hard, outdoor 6 – 14 August 2016	53	3R	(Australia) Samantha Stosur (13)	17	Win	6–0, 7–5
Summer Olympics; Rio de Janeiro, Brazil; Olympic Games; Hard, outdoor 6 – 14 August 2016	54	QF	(United Kingdom) Johanna Konta (10)	13	Win	6–1, 6–2
Summer Olympics; Rio de Janeiro, Brazil; Olympic Games; Hard, outdoor 6 – 14 August 2016	55	SF	(United States) Madison Keys (7)	9	Win	6–3, 7–5
Summer Olympics; Rio de Janeiro, Brazil; Olympic Games; Hard, outdoor 6 – 14 August 2016	56	F	(Puerto Rico) Monica Puig	34	Loss (3)	4–6, 6–4, 1–6
Cincinnati Masters; Cincinnati, United States; Premier 5 Hard, outdoor 15 – 21 August 2016
Cincinnati Masters; Cincinnati, United States; Premier 5 Hard, outdoor 15 – 21 August 2016	–	1R	Bye			
Cincinnati Masters; Cincinnati, United States; Premier 5 Hard, outdoor 15 – 21 August 2016	57	2R	(France) Kristina Mladenovic	37	Win	6–0, 7–5
Cincinnati Masters; Cincinnati, United States; Premier 5 Hard, outdoor 15 – 21 August 2016	58	3R	(Czech Republic) Barbora Strýcová	20	Win	7–6^{(7–5)}, 6–4
Cincinnati Masters; Cincinnati, United States; Premier 5 Hard, outdoor 15 – 21 August 2016	59	QF	(Spain) Carla Suárez Navarro (9)	12	Win	4–6, 6–3, 6–0
Cincinnati Masters; Cincinnati, United States; Premier 5 Hard, outdoor 15 – 21 August 2016	60	SF	(Romania) Simona Halep (3)	4	Win	6–3, 6–4
Cincinnati Masters; Cincinnati, United States; Premier 5 Hard, outdoor 15 – 21 August 2016	61	F	(Czech Republic) Karolína Plíšková (15)	17	Loss (4)	3–6, 1–6
US Open; New York City, United States; Grand Slam; Hard, outdoor 29 August – 11 September 2016
US Open; New York City, United States; Grand Slam; Hard, outdoor 29 August – 11 September 2016	62	1R	(Slovenia) Polona Hercog	120	Win	6–0, 1–0 ret.
US Open; New York City, United States; Grand Slam; Hard, outdoor 29 August – 11 September 2016	63	2R	(Croatia) Mirjana Lučić-Baroni	57	Win	6–2, 7–6^{(11–9)}
US Open; New York City, United States; Grand Slam; Hard, outdoor 29 August – 11 September 2016	64	3R	(United States) Catherine Bellis (Q)	158	Win	6–1, 6–1
US Open; New York City, United States; Grand Slam; Hard, outdoor 29 August – 11 September 2016	65	4R	(Czech Republic) Petra Kvitová (14)	16	Win	6–3, 7–5
US Open; New York City, United States; Grand Slam; Hard, outdoor 29 August – 11 September 2016	66	QF	(Italy) Roberta Vinci (7)	8	Win	7–5, 6–0
US Open; New York City, United States; Grand Slam; Hard, outdoor 29 August – 11 September 2016	67	SF	(Denmark) Caroline Wozniacki	74	Win	6–4, 6–3
US Open; New York City, United States; Grand Slam; Hard, outdoor 29 August – 11 September 2016	68	W	(Czech Republic) Karolína Plíšková (10)	12	Win (3)	6–3, 4–6, 6–4
Wuhan Open; Wuhan, China; Premier 5 Hard, outdoor 25 September – 1 October 2016
Wuhan Open; Wuhan, China; Premier 5 Hard, outdoor 25 September – 1 October 2016	–	1R	Bye			
Wuhan Open; Wuhan, China; Premier 5 Hard, outdoor 25 September – 1 October 2016	69	2R	(France) Kristina Mladenovic	54	Win	6–7^{(4–7)}, 6–1, 6–4
Wuhan Open; Wuhan, China; Premier 5 Hard, outdoor 25 September – 1 October 2016	70	3R	(Czech Republic) Petra Kvitová (14)	16	Loss	7–6^{(12–10)}, 5–7, 4–6
China Open; Beijing, China; Premier Mandatory; Hard, outdoor 2 – 9 October 2016
China Open; Beijing, China; Premier Mandatory; Hard, outdoor 2 – 9 October 2016	71	1R	(Czech Republic) Kateřina Siniaková (Q)	51	Win	6–4, 6–4
China Open; Beijing, China; Premier Mandatory; Hard, outdoor 2 – 9 October 2016	72	2R	(Czech Republic) Barbora Strýcová	21	Win	6–3, 7–6^{(7–4)}
China Open; Beijing, China; Premier Mandatory; Hard, outdoor 2 – 9 October 2016	73	3R	(Ukraine) Elina Svitolina	19	Loss	3–6, 5–7
Hong Kong Tennis Open; Hong Kong; International; Hard, outdoor 10 – 16 October 2016
Hong Kong Tennis Open; Hong Kong; International; Hard, outdoor 10 – 16 October 2016	74	1R	(Greece) Maria Sakkari	97	Win	6–4, 6–4
Hong Kong Tennis Open; Hong Kong; International; Hard, outdoor 10 – 16 October 2016	75	2R	(United States) Louisa Chirico	60	Win	6–2, 3–6, 6–2
Hong Kong Tennis Open; Hong Kong; International; Hard, outdoor 10 – 16 October 2016	76	QF	(Australia) Daria Gavrilova (8)	38	Loss	3–6, 1–6
WTA Finals; Singapore; WTA Finals; Hard, indoor 23 – 30 October 2016
WTA Finals; Singapore; WTA Finals; Hard, indoor 23 – 30 October 2016	77	RR	(Slovakia) Dominika Cibulková (7)	8	Win	7–6^{(7–5)}, 2–6, 6–3
WTA Finals; Singapore; WTA Finals; Hard, indoor 23 – 30 October 2016	78	RR	(Romania) Simona Halep (3)	4	Win	6–4, 6–2
WTA Finals; Singapore; WTA Finals; Hard, indoor 23 – 30 October 2016	79	RR	(United States) Madison Keys (6)	7	Win	6–3, 6–3
WTA Finals; Singapore; WTA Finals; Hard, indoor 23 – 30 October 2016	80	SF	(Poland) Agnieszka Radwańska (2)	3	Win	6–2, 6–1
WTA Finals; Singapore; WTA Finals; Hard, indoor 23 – 30 October 2016	81	F	(Slovakia) Dominika Cibulková (7)	8	Loss (5)	3–6, 4–6

=== Doubles matches ===
Tournament	Match	Round	Opponents (Seed or Key)	Rank	Result	Score
Brisbane International; Melbourne, Australia; Premier; Hard, outdoor 4 – 9 January 2016; Partner: (Germany) Andrea Petkovic
Brisbane International; Melbourne, Australia; Premier; Hard, outdoor 4 – 9 January 2016; Partner: (Germany) Andrea Petkovic	1	1R	(Ukraine) Kateryna Bondarenko / (Ukraine) Olga Savchuk	76 / 53	Win	7–6^{(7–2)}, 6–3
Brisbane International; Melbourne, Australia; Premier; Hard, outdoor 4 – 9 January 2016; Partner: (Germany) Andrea Petkovic	2	QF	(United States) Raquel Atawo / (France) Alizé Cornet	18 / 108	Win	6–2, 6–3
Brisbane International; Melbourne, Australia; Premier; Hard, outdoor 4 – 9 January 2016; Partner: (Germany) Andrea Petkovic	3	SF	(Spain) Anabel Medina Garrigues / (Spain) Arantxa Parra Santonja	32 / 37	Win	2–6, 6–3, [10–2]
Brisbane International; Melbourne, Australia; Premier; Hard, outdoor 4 – 9 January 2016; Partner: (Germany) Andrea Petkovic	4	F	(Switzerland) Martina Hingis / (India) Sania Mirza (1)	2 / 1	Loss (1)	5–7, 1–6
Indian Wells Masters; Indian Wells, United States; Premier Mandatory; Hard, outdoor 7 – 20 March 2016; Partner: (Germany) Andrea Petkovic
Indian Wells Masters; Indian Wells, United States; Premier Mandatory; Hard, outdoor 7 – 20 March 2016; Partner: (Germany) Andrea Petkovic	5	1R	(Chinese Taipei) Chan Hao-ching / (Chinese Taipei) Chan Yung-jan (2)	6 / 5	Loss	4–6, 3–6
Canadian Open; Montreal, Canada; Premier 5 Hard, outdoor 25 – 31 July 2016; Partner: (Germany) Andrea Petkovic
Canadian Open; Montreal, Canada; Premier 5 Hard, outdoor 25 – 31 July 2016; Partner: (Germany) Andrea Petkovic	6	1R	(United States) Christina McHale / (United States) Asia Muhammad	79 / 86	Loss	7–5, 5–7, [6–10]
2016 Summer Olympics; Rio de Janeiro, Brazil; Olympic Games; Hard, outdoor 6 – 14 August 2016; Partner: (Germany) Andrea Petkovic
2016 Summer Olympics; Rio de Janeiro, Brazil; Olympic Games; Hard, outdoor 6 – 14 August 2016; Partner: (Germany) Andrea Petkovic	7	1R	(Italy) Sara Errani / (Italy) Roberta Vinci (8)	23 / 107	Loss	2–6, 2–6

== Tournament schedule ==
=== Singles schedule ===
Kerber's 2016 singles tournament schedule is as follows:

Date	Tournament	City	Category	Surface	2015 result	2015 points	2016 points	Outcome
4 January 2016– 9 January 2016	Brisbane International	Brisbane	Premier	Hard	QF	100	305	Lost in the final to Victoria Azarenka
11 January 2016– 16 January 2016	Sydney International	Sydney	Premier	Hard	SF	185	55	Withdrew before second round match against Ekaterina Makarova
18 January 2016– 31 January 2016	Australian Open	Melbourne	Grand Slam	Hard	1R	10	2,000	Won in the final against Serena Williams
6 February 2016– 7 February 2016	Fed Cup: Germany vs Switzerland; World Group First Round	Leipzig	Fed Cup	Hard (i)	SF	—	—	Switzerland def. Germany, 3–2; Germany relegated to WG Play-offs
21 February 2016– 27 February 2016	Qatar Open	Doha	Premier 5	Hard	1R	1	1	Lost in second round against Zheng Saisai
7 March 2016– 20 March 2016	Indian Wells Masters	Indian Wells	Premier Mandatory	Hard	2R	10	10	Lost in second round against Denisa Allertová
21 March 2016– 3 April 2016	Miami Open	Miami	Premier Mandatory	Hard	3R	65	390	Lost in the semifinals against Victoria Azarenka
4 April 2016– 10 April 2016	Charleston Open	Charleston	Premier	Clay	W	470	185	Retired in the semifinals against Sloane Stephens
16 April 2016– 17 April 2016	Fed Cup: Romania vs Germany; World Group play-offs	Cluj-Napoca	Fed Cup	Clay (i)	SF	—	—	Germany def. Romania, 4–1; Germany remain in World Group
18 April 2016– 24 April 2016	Stuttgart Open	Stuttgart	Premier	Clay (i)	W	470	470	Won in the final against Laura Siegemund
1 May 2016– 8 May 2016	Madrid Open	Madrid	Premier Mandatory	Clay	1R	10	10	Lost in first round against Barbora Strýcová
9 May 2016– 15 May 2016	Italian Open	Rome	Premier 5	Clay	2R	60	1	Lost in second round against Eugenie Bouchard
23 May 2016– 5 June 2016	French Open	Paris	Grand Slam	Clay	3R	130	10	Lost in first round against Kiki Bertens
13 June 2016– 19 June 2016	Birmingham Classic	Birmingham	Premier	Grass	W	470	100	Lost in the quarterfinals against Carla Suárez Navarro
27 June 2016– 10 July 2016	Wimbledon Championships	London	Grand Slam	Grass	3R	130	1,300	Lost in the final to Serena Williams
18 July 2016– 24 July 2016	Swedish Open	Båstad	International	Clay	DNS	—	30	Withdrew before second round match against Lara Arruabarrena
25 July 2016– 31 July 2016	Canadian Open	Montreal	Premier 5	Hard	3R	105	350	Lost in semifinals against Simona Halep
6 August 2016– 14 August 2016	Summer Olympics	Rio de Janeiro	Olympic Games	Hard	QF (2012)	—	—	Lost in the final to Monica Puig
15 August 2016– 21 August 2016	Cincinnati Masters	Cincinnati	Premier 5	Hard	1R	1	585	Lost in the final to Karolína Plíšková
29 August 2016– 11 September 2016	US Open	New York	Grand Slam	Hard	3R	130	2,000	Won in the final against Karolína Plíšková
25 September 2016– 1 October 2016	Wuhan Open	Wuhan	Premier 5	Hard	SF	350	105	Lost in the third round match against Petra Kvitová
2 October 2016– 9 October 2016	China Open	Beijing	Premier Mandatory	Hard	QF	215	120	Lost in the third round match against Elina Svitolina
10 October 2016– 16 October 2016	Hong Kong Tennis Open	Hong Kong	International	Hard	F	180	60	Lost in the quarterfinals against Daria Gavrilova
23 October 2016– 30 October 2016	WTA Finals	Singapore	WTA Finals	Hard (i)	RR	370	1,080	Lost in the final to Dominika Cibulková
Total year-end points							9,167	

== Yearly records ==
=== Head-to-head matchups ===
(Bold denotes a top 10 player at the time of the most recent match between the two players, Italic denotes top 50; for players whose ranking changed over the course of the year, see the note for a more complete breakdown by ranking.)

- (Romania) **Simona Halep** 4–1
- (United States) **Madison Keys** 3–0 (Note: Keys was ranked inside the top 50 but outside the top 10 for their first meeting (1–0) but inside the top 10 for their following meetings (2–0).)
- (Czech Republic) Barbora Strýcová 3–1
- (Spain) Carla Suárez Navarro 3–1
- (United States) Madison Brengle 2–0
- (Romania) Irina-Camelia Begu 2–0
- (Germany) Annika Beck 2–0 (Note: Beck was ranked outside the top 50 for their first meeting (1–0) but inside the top 50 but outside the top 10 for their second meeting (1–0).)
- (Japan) Misaki Doi 2–0 (Note: Doi was ranked outside the top 50 for their first meeting (1–0) but inside the top 50 but outside the top 10 for their second meeting (1–0).)
- (United Kingdom) Johanna Konta 2–0
- (Croatia) Mirjana Lučić-Baroni 2–0
- (France) Kristina Mladenovic 2–0 (Note: Mladenovic was ranked inside the top 50 but outside the top 10 for their first meeting (1–0) but outside the top 50 for their second meeting (1–0).)
- (Czech Republic) **Petra Kvitová** 2–1 (Note: Kvitová was ranked inside the top 10 for their first meeting (1–0) but ranked inside the top 50 but outside the top 10 for their following meetings (1–1).)
- (Ukraine) Elina Svitolina 2–1
- (Italy) Camila Giorgi 1–0
- (Russia) Anastasia Pavlyuchenkova 1–0
- (Romania) Alexandra Dulgheru 1–0
- (Switzerland) Timea Bacsinszky 1–0
- (Hungary) Tímea Babos 1–0
- (Spain) Lara Arruabarrena 1–0
- (Slovakia) Kristína Kučová 1–0
- (Germany) Laura Siegemund 1–0
- (China) Peng Shuai 1–0
- (United Kingdom) Laura Robson 1–0
- (United States) Varvara Lepchenko 1–0
- (Germany) Carina Witthöft 1–0
- (United States) **Venus Williams** 1–0
- (Sweden) Cornelia Lister 1–0
- (Russia) Daria Kasatkina 1–0
- (Colombia) Mariana Duque 1–0
- (Australia) Samantha Stosur 1–0
- (Slovenia) Polona Hercog 1–0
- (United States) CiCi Bellis 1–0
- (Italy) **Roberta Vinci** 1–0
- (Denmark) Caroline Wozniacki 1–0
- (Czech Republic) Kateřina Siniaková 1–0
- (Greece) Maria Sakkari 1–0
- (United States) Louisa Chirico 1–0
- (Poland) **Agnieszka Radwańska** 1–0
- (Netherlands) Kiki Bertens 1–1
- (United States) **Serena Williams** 1–1
- (Canada) Eugenie Bouchard 1–1
- (Czech Republic) Karolína Plíšková 1–1
- (Australia) Daria Gavrilova 1–1
- (Slovakia) **Dominika Cibulková** 1–1
- (Belarus) **Victoria Azarenka** 1–2 (Note: Azarenka was ranked inside the top 50 but outside the top 10 for their first two meetings (1–1) but inside the top 10 for their third meeting (0–1).)
- (Switzerland) Belinda Bencic 0–1
- (China) Zheng Saisai 0–1
- (Czech Republic) Denisa Allertová 0–1
- (United States) Sloane Stephens 0–1
- (Puerto Rico) Monica Puig 0–1

=== Finals ===
==== Singles: 8 (3–5) ====
Legend Grand Slams (2–1) WTA Tour Championships (0–1) WTA Premier Mandatory (0–0) Olympic Games (0–1) WTA Premier 5 (0–1) WTA Premier (1–1) WTA International (0–0)	Finals by surface Hard (2–4) Clay (1–0) Grass (0–1)	Finals by venue Outdoors (2–4) Indoors (1–1)

Result	Date	Category	Tournament	Surface	Opponent	Score
Runner-up	9 January 2016	Premier	Brisbane International, Australia	Hard	(Belarus) Victoria Azarenka	3–6, 1–6
Winner	30 January 2016	Grand Slam	Australian Open, Australia	Hard	(United States) Serena Williams	6–4, 3–6, 6–4
Winner	24 April 2016	Premier	Stuttgart Open, Germany	Clay (i)	(Germany) Laura Siegemund	6–4, 6–0
Runner-up	9 July 2016	Grand Slam	Wimbledon Championships, United Kingdom	Grass	(United States) Serena Williams	5–7, 3–6
Silver	13 August 2016	Olympic Games	Summer Olympics, Brazil	Hard	(Puerto Rico) Monica Puig	4–6, 6–4, 1–6
Runner-up	21 August 2016	Premier 5	Cincinnati Masters, United States	Hard	(Czech Republic) Karolína Plíšková	3–6, 1–6
Winner	10 September 2016	Grand Slam	US Open, United States	Hard	(Czech Republic) Karolína Plíšková	6–3, 4–6, 6–4
Runner-up	30 October 2016	Tour Championships	WTA Finals, Singapore	Hard (i)	(Slovakia) Dominika Cibulková	3–6, 4–6

==== Doubles: 1 (0–1) ====
Legend Grand Slams (0–0) WTA Tour Championships (0–0) WTA Premier Mandatory (0–0) WTA Premier 5 (0–0) WTA Premier (0–1) WTA International (0–0)	Finals by surface Hard (0–1) Clay (0–0) Grass (0–0)	Finals by venue Outdoors (0–1) Indoors (0–0)

Result	Date	Category	Tournament	Surface	Partner	Opponents	Score in the final
Runner-up	9 January 2016	Premier	Brisbane International, Australia	Hard	(Germany) Andrea Petkovic	(Switzerland) Martina Hingis (India) Sania Mirza	5–7, 1–6

=== Earnings ===
**Singles**
Event	Prize money	Year-to-date
Brisbane International	$103,850	$103,850
Sydney International	$10,540	$114,390
**Australian Open**	$2,553,740	$2,668,130
Qatar Open	$15,185	$2,683,315
Indian Wells Masters	$19,530	$2,702,845
Miami Open	$251,500	$2,954,345
Charleston Open	$33,600	$2,987,945
**Stuttgart Open**	$129,551	$3,117,496
Madrid Open	$15,193	$3,132,689
Italian Open	$15,680	$3,148,369
French Open	$32,314	$3,180,683
Birmingham Classic	$22,310	$3,202,993
Wimbledon Championships	$1,532,910	$4,735,903
Swedish Open	$3,400	$4,739,303
Canadian Open	$121,150	$4,860,453
Cincinnati Masters	$247,320	$5,107,773
**US Open**	$3,437,565	$8,545,338
Wuhan Open	$26,900	$8,572,238
China Open	$62,768	$8,635,006
Hong Kong Tennis Open	$6,175	$8,641,181
WTA Finals	$1,200,000	$9,841,181
		$9,841,181
**Doubles**
Event	Prize money	Year-to-date
Brisbane International	$12,259	$12,259
Indian Wells Masters	$5,930	$18,189
Canadian Open	$2,245	$20,434
		$20,434
**Total**
		$9,861,615

Figures in United States dollars (USD) unless noted.

Bold denotes tournament win

== See also ==
- 2016 WTA Tour
- 2016 Serena Williams tennis season
- Angelique Kerber career statistics
