= 2016 Serena Williams tennis season =

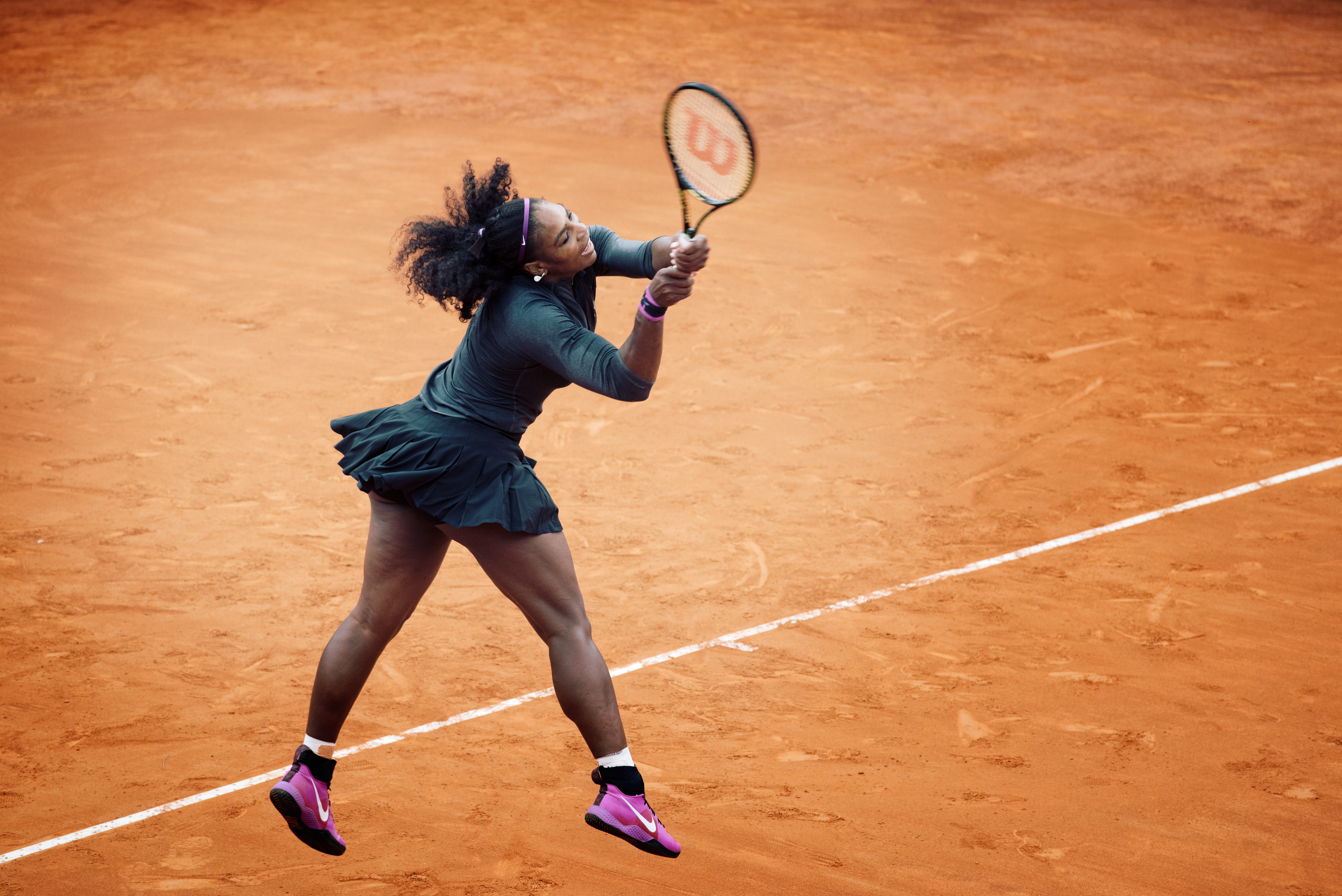
- Full name: Serena Jameka Williams
- Country: United States
- Calendar prize money: $6,815,639

Singles
- Season record: 38–6
- Calendar titles: 2
- Current ranking: No. 2
- Year-end ranking: No. 2
- Ranking change from previous year: ▼1

Grand Slam & significant results
- Australian Open: F
- French Open: F
- Wimbledon: W
- US Open: SF
- Olympic Games: 3R

Doubles
- Season record: 8–3
- Calendar titles: 1
- Current ranking: No. 34
- Ranking change from previous year: +217

Grand Slam doubles results
- French Open: 3R
- Wimbledon: W
- Olympic Games: 1R
- Last updated on: 12 September 2016.

The 2016 Serena Williams tennis season officially began on 5 January with the start of the 2016 Hopman Cup. Williams entered the season as the number one ranked player and the defending champion at five tournaments, including the Australian Open, French Open and Wimbledon.

On the week of September 5, 2016, Williams tied Steffi Graf for the longest consecutive weeks as World No. 1 at 186 weeks.

On July 9, 2016, Williams defeated Angelique Kerber in the finals at Wimbledon to claim her 22nd major singles title and tie the Open Era record for Grand Slam singles titles with Steffi Graf.

== Year in detail ==
=== Australian Open Series ===
==== Hopman Cup ====
For the second consecutive year and for the fourth time in her career Williams started her season at the Hopman Cup. Williams partnered Jack Sock for the event and was originally set to start her campaign against Ukraine's Elina Svitolina but withdrew before the match citing knee inflammation. The world No.1 took to the court for the first time against Australia Gold's Jarmila Wolfe and, after dropping the first set, retired from the match due to the recurring inflammation in her knee. Despite retiring from her first match Williams remained optimistic that the swelling would go down before the first major of the year. The following day she announced she was pulling out of the tie against the Czech Republic. Williams was replaced by Vicky Duval.

==== Australian Open ====
Williams returned to competitive action for the first time in four months at the season's first major. As the defending champion the world No. 1 sought to add a seventh Australian Open title to her haul. In the opening round Williams faced off against the highest ranked unseeded player Camila Giorgi. Williams needed just a single break in each set to secure a straight sets victory and advance to the second round. Her opponent in the second round was former doubles world No.1 Hsieh Su-wei. Williams lost just three games and wrapped up her victory in an hour to set up a third round against Russia's Daria Kasatkina. The world No. 1 overwhelmed her young Russian opponent, for the loss of two games, in 44 minutes to reach the second week of the tournament. Serena would continue her dominant form by dispatching Margarita Gasparyan in a rematch of their 2015 first round Wimbledon encounter. Just as in their previous match, Serena served first and was broken but she responded by reeling in the next four games before breaking for a third time in the eighth game to take the first set. She then won the second set with the drop of one game. In the quarterfinals, Serena faced her long-time rival Maria Sharapova in a rematch of the 2015 Australian Open Final. It was their twenty-first encounter, properly beginning with a very tight first set that began with Serena's slow start. Serena quickly regrouped and managed to break Sharapova in the ninth game, needing 5 break points to do so. She served out the first set and then won the first five games of the second set. She then closed out the match after Maria avoided the bagel with her last service game. Serena faced Agnieszka Radwańska in the semifinals. Serena bagelled her in the first set in 21 minutes with only four unforced errors. The second set was tighter with Serena being broken when serving at 3–2. Serena managed to break back in the ninth game and serve out the match. Serena faced Angelique Kerber in her 26th Grand Slam final as the overwhelming favorite in her efforts to match the Open Era record in Grand Slams, but Serena was defeated in three close sets, her first defeat in the finals of the Australian Open, her first defeat in a three-set Grand Slam Final, and her first defeat in a Grand Slam final since the 2011 U.S. Open. Bearing the weight of history on her shoulders, Serena failed to display the dominant form that helped her reach the final without dropping a set. The match featured Serena committing 46 unforced errors when she has averaged as 20 unforced errors before the final. Throughout the tournament, Serena displayed confident net skills that she lacked in 2015, but they proved to be part of her downfall as she won less than 50% of her points at the net.

=== Early Hard Court Season ===
==== Indian Wells ====
Rebounding from her loss in the Australian Open, Serena opened her Indian Wells campaign by handily defeating Laura Siegemund of Germany with the loss of only three games to advance to the third round, having received a bye in the first. Serena proceeded to fave Yulia Putintseva for the second time in her career. Serena was broken twice at the end of the first set and broke back both times to force a tie-break, which she won. Serena committed nearly 30 errors in the first set and cut down her mistakes to but five errors in the second to win 7–6(2), 6–0. Serena faced Kateryna Bondarenko in the fourth round and defeated her 6–2, 6–2. She then faced defending champion Simona Halep in the match they would have had the previous year. Despite failing to serve out the first set at 5–3. Serena broke back and ultimately won in straight sets. Serena then faced Agnieszka Radwańska in a rematch of their Australian Open semifinal. Radwanka began the match aggressively, breaking Serena early and setting up a double break point, but Serena saved it and won seven straight games from 2–4 down in the first set to win the set and lead 3–0 in the second. Errors returned to Serena's racket and Radwanka battled to break Serena twice in an effort to serve out the set 6–5, but Serena broke back to force a tie-break during which she won the seven straight points after losing the first. Serena Williams faced a resurgent Victoria Azarenka in their twenty-first career meeting. Nervous, Serena committed two double faults and two errors to be broken at love. Though she constructed several break back points, Azarenka saved them all and won the first set 6–4. Serena then went down 5–1 quickly in the second set to before finding her game to real in the next three games and establish a 15–40 on Azarenka's serve. As in the Australian Open final, Serena failed to take her chances to level the set at five all and she lost the next four points, thus losing to Azarenka 6–4, 6–4 for the first time since 2013 as well ending her 15-match winning streak at the tournament. Azarenka also became the first woman to defeat Serena four times in a final.

=== Miami ===
Williams entered Miami as a three-time defending champion. After a first round bye, she defeated Christina McHale in the second round and Zarina Diyas in the third round before succumbing in the fourth round to long-time rival Svetlana Kuznetsova in a three set match that included a very tight first set. This match ended a 20-match unbeaten run at the Miami Open.

=== Clay Season ===
==== Italian Open ====
In Rome, Williams played her first clay court match of the season against Anna-Lena Friedsam in the second round and won easily. In the following rounds, Williams failed to drop a set en route to the final, defeating Christina McHale, Svetlana Kuznetsova, and Irina-Camelia Begu all in straight sets. By doing so, Williams reached her third final of the year, hoping to finally capture her 70th overall title. In the final, Williams faced fellow American Madison Keys in a rare all-American clay court final. After a tense first set, Williams was able to defeat Keys 7-6(5), 6-3 for her 70th overall singles title in her career.

==== French Open ====
Following her victory in Rome, Williams returned to Paris as the defending champion and the favorite to defend her French Open crown. However, she had to face the task of defending her No. 1 ranking. Williams opened her title defense against Magdaléna Rybáriková, defeating her easily with the loss of two games to advance to the second round. Williams continued her campaign against Teliana Pereira, again achieving an easy victory of 6–2,6-1. In the third round, Williams faced Kristina Mladenovic of France. Williams took the first set 6–4 in the only break of the match, occurring in the last game of the set. In the second set, Williams did not face a break point with great serving, but she her return game was much sloppier during break opportunities, establishing a 40–0 lead on Mladenovic serve twice only to lose the game. Williams was forced into a tie break that followed a rain delay. When play resumed, Williams fell behind in the tie break 2-5 before asserting herself to match point. She held four match points in the tie break and had to save one set point before closing out the match with an 11–9 edge. A rain delay prevented Williams from playing her fourth round encounter for several days, ultimately forcing her to play four days in a row if she were to advance to the finals. Due to the rain, court conditions were much heavier. Williams eventually faced Elina Svitolina, who was under the charge of one of Williams' greatest rivals, Justine Henin. Williams erased her poor play from the third round to overwhelm Svitolina 6–1,6-1. Following the defeats of Angelique Kerber and Agnieszka Radwańska by the fourth round, Williams kept her top ranking.

In the quarterfinals, Williams faced first time Grand Slam quarterfinalist Yulia Putintseva in a rematch of their Indian Wells encounter. While Putintseva's play was exceptional and fearless, errors flowed from Williams' racket in the first set. At 5-all in the first, Williams established a 40–0 lead in her own service game and was broken with a stream of poor decisions, errors, and Putintseva's consistency, allowing Putintseva eventually take the set. Williams was broken at the start of the second but went on to reel in the next for games confidently before again squandering a definitive lead. At 4-all on her own serve, Williams was nearly broken again, but saved the break point to win the game and eventually the set on a double fault from Putintseva. Williams finally corrected her game in the third to claim the match 5–7,6-4,6-1. Following the match, Williams was outed as suffering an adductor injury, but she refused to acknowledge the injury any further than having "some problems." Williams then faced Kiki Bertens, who was in her first Grand Slam semifinal and on a 12-match winning streak but also suffering her own calf injury. Regardless, Bertens played confident and fearless tennis, breaking the hampered Williams early and having her own set point on Williams' serve. Williams saved the set point to win three straight games, but Bertens managed to force a tie-break. In the breaker, both players had set points, but Williams took the first set with a 9–7 edge. In the second, Williams took advantage of Bertens' increasingly hampered movement with well-executed drop shots. She won the match 7-6(7), 6–4. In the finals, Williams faced Garbiñe Muguruza in a rematch of their 2015 Wimbledon encounter. Williams began the match brightly with strong serving, but her first-serve percentage decreased while Muguruza's aggressiveness and confidence increased. Though Williams constructed break points well, Muguruza's clutch performance on big points allowed her to take the opening set. Williams' level did not rise in the second set, and she went down an early break. While she managed to save three championship points on her own serve, Muguruza took the final game at love to clinch her first Grand Slam singles title 7–5, 6–4.

Williams' defeat was represented her first defeat in back-to-back Grand Slam Finals though she ultimately completed the Career Slam Runner-Up. Her defeat was also written by tennis experts and commentators as a changing of the guard in women's tennis, led by Muguruza, with doubt that Williams could make a solid comeback following her U.S. Open defeat the previous year or make a claim at Steffi Graf's Open Era record of 22 Grand Slam singles title. However, Williams' consistency to regularly advance to tournament finals placed herself at the top of the leader-board in the Race to Singapore.

=== Wimbledon ===
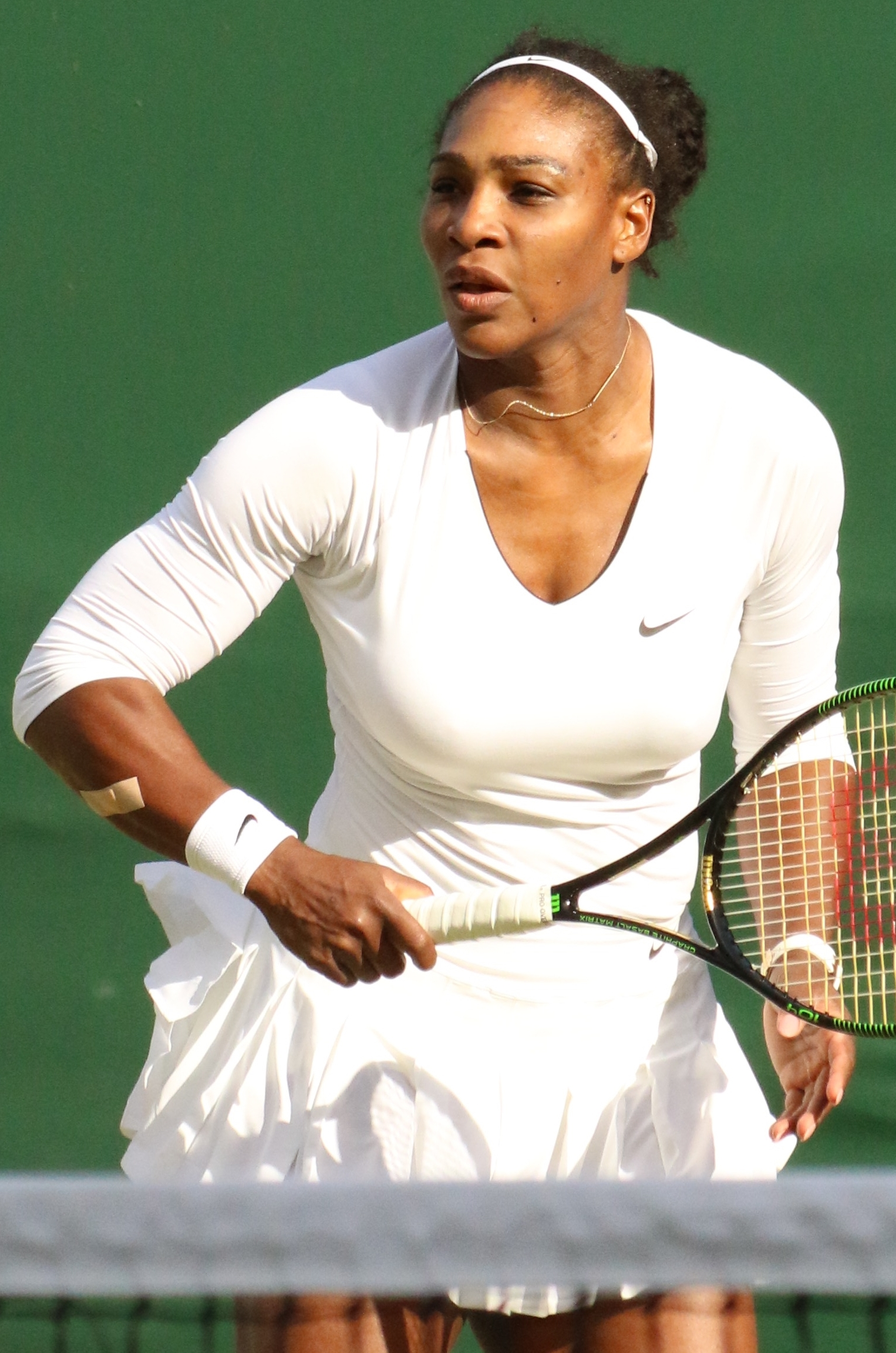
Williams won her 22nd slam at Wimbledon.

After failing to reach her 22nd major title once more at the French Open, Williams was faced with doubt and uncertainty by tennis experts, commentators, and the general media for her inability to perform to her usual standard in tournament finals. Therefore, she entered Wimbledon as an uneasy favorite for the title. Serena opened her campaign with a victory against Amra Sadiković, defeating her in two comfortable sets. Williams then faced Christina McHale for the third time this season in the second round. Williams was fully tested and pushed to the limit by Christina's resilient tennis. Christina broke Serena's serve early but Williams pegged back to get the match back on serve, leading into a tie break that Williams lost 9–7. It was Williams' first tiebreak loss of the season. Williams played much more confident and aggressive tennis in the second set to claim it, but in the third, McHale raised her level even further to break early. William' ultimately got the match back on serve before breaking again in the ninth game then closing out her final game with three consecutive aces to win the match 6(7)-7, 6–2, 6–4. After losing the first set, Williams smashed her racket and received a $10,000 fine for unsportsmanlike conduct. Despite the setback, Williams' performance for the rest of the championship drastically altered and improved to produce the best tennis she had executed all season following her burst of anger.

Williams quickly demonstrated her improvement during her third round encounter against German Annika Beck, held during People's Sunday due to the multiple rain delays of the tournament. Williams went down a break early in the first set, but then won 11 of the last twelve games in an overwhelming performance to win the match 6–3.6-0. Williams' victory earned her, her 300th victory at a Grand Slam, surpassing Chris Evert and being six Grand Slam match victories from tying Martina Navratilova. In the fourth round, Williams faced rival Svetlana Kuznetsova for the third time this season. The first set of the match proved tight with both players breaking each other twice, during which rain suspended the match at 5 all when Williams broke back as Kuznetsova was serving for the set. The roof over Centre Court was closed and the match resumed with Williams returning to her imperious form to claim final eight games of the match. Williams accumulated 43 winners, 14 aces, and 14 unforced errors, whereas Kuznetsova only won 42 points on the match. In the quarterfinals, Williams faced Anastasia Pavlyuchenkova. Williams maintained her perfect record against the Russian in a tight 6–4,6-4 straight sets victory that only featured one break of serve in both sets due to both players serving and defending brilliantly in an exhibition of power tennis. Williams did not face a break point during the match. In the semifinals, Williams faced fellow veteran and resurgent Elena Vesnina in her first ever Grand Slam semi-final. Williams took advantage of Vesnina's nerves from the onset and completely overwhelmed her in a 48-minute display of consistency, movement, and power in a 6–2,6-0 victory. Williams did not face a break point. She hammered 28 winners with 11 aces and only suffered 7 unforced errors to advance to the finals. Williams' quick victory marked the shortest women's Wimbledon semifinal in history. However, the victory was only Williams' second quickest routing of an opponent in a semi-final, which she did so against Sara Errani during the 2013 French Open.

At the beginning of the Championships, Williams' No. 1 ranking was again in jeopardy, but she kept her top ranking by advancing to the finals while enjoying her 300th week at the top of the WTA. In the finals, Williams faced Angelique Kerber in a rematch of their Australian Open encounter, and it was the first Grand Slam since Amélie Mauresmo and Justine Henin in 2006 that featured the same pair of Grand Slam finalists in the same year. En route to the final, Kerber had defeated Serena's sister Venus Williams in the semi-final, thus ruining a highly anticipated all-Williams final, which would have been the first since 2009. During the match, Williams was far sharper and more prepared for Kerber's defensive game and sharp cross court angles than she was in Australia. Williams earned her revenge against Kerber (and avenged sister Venus) in straight sets in a high quality contest that featured only one break of serve in both sets. Williams offered only one break point during the entire match, which she erased with an ace that accompanied the 12 others that passed by Kerber in an impeccable display of serving, during which Williams also struck 27 unreturnable serves and boasted an 88% first serve percentage. Williams continued to strike a powerful offensive game with a 39-21 ratio of winners to unforced errors while Kerber had only a 12-9 ratio. Williams' victory at Wimbledon allowed to be the first to qualify for the 2016 WTA Finals. More importantly, her victory allowed her to tie Steffi Graf's Open Era Grand Slam record of 22 major titles, and place her two Grand Slam victories behind the all-time record held by Margaret Court.

Williams' performance in singles was enhanced by the effort she and Venus placed in their doubles tournament of the Championship. Unseeded, the Williams sisters dropped one set in the quarterfinals to ultimately win their 6th Wimbledon Doubles title and their 14th Grand Slam Doubles title by defeating Tímea Babos and Yaroslava Shvedova, leaving their perfect record of Grand Slam doubles finals intact.

=== US Open Series & Olympics ===
On July 24, Williams withdrew from Rogers Cup citing a shoulder inflammation injury in which was the defending semifinalist. She subsequently participated in the Olympics in Rio de Janeiro where she was the defending gold medalist in both singles and doubles. In the first round of the doubles competition, partnering with her sister Venus they lost to the Czech duo of Lucie Šafářová and Barbora Strýcová, ending their career record of 15–0 dating back to the 2000 Olympics. In singles, after victories over Daria Gavrilova and Alizé Cornet in the first two rounds, Williams faced Ukraine's Elina Svitolina in the third round in what was a rematch of this year's French Open quarterfinal. However, she lost to the Ukrainian 4–6, 3–6. Days after the Olympics, Williams took a late wildcard for the Western & Southern Open, where she was the defending champion, but then decided to withdraw due to concerns from the same shoulder injury/inflammation from earlier in the summer.

==== US Open ====
After a successful 22nd Grand Slam win in Wimbledon, injury woes and an Olympic defeat, Williams hoped to achieve her bid on a record 23rd Grand Slam in her career and a further 7th US Open win. At the first round, she opened her campaign against Russian veteran and Olympic Women's Doubles champion Ekaterina Makarova in the first round on their sixth meeting, as Williams got stronger on her victory and winning in two straight sets. Facing with injuries from weeks back, Williams improved well with the game meant her injury was fine. Williams then faced fellow American opponent Vania King in the second round that was Williams' 900th career match, which she won in two consecutive straight set victory in a row lasted in one hour and five minutes. By the third round, Williams faced Swedish rival Johanna Larsson, the match lasted an hour and a third consecutive straight set win. In the fourth round, she had an encounter with Yaroslava Shvedova. Williams won the match in another straight set victory with a time of two 34-minute intervals per set. In the quarterfinal stage, Williams faced against Simona Halep on what was the rematch of the Indian Wells quarterfinal earlier in the year, Williams started a tough momentum on the first set. By the second set, Williams struggled to keep on a pace staved off with 12 breaks points which Williams could not keep up, Halep won the set. On the third set, Williams came with two break points to win and advanced through the semifinal. In the semifinals, Williams faced Czech Karolína Plíšková in her first Grand Slam semifinal. Williams started the semifinal sluggish and never regained any momentum as Pliskova beat Williams for the first time and entered her first Grand Slam final. Throughout the final, Williams seemed to struggle with a knee injury which limited her ability to chase down shots from Pliskova. This ended her bid to take the 23rd Grand Slam victory and lost the World No. 1 ranking to eventual champion Angelique Kerber.

=== Remainder of the season ===
On September 23, Williams announced she has withdrawn in both the Wuhan Open and China Open due to the same injury sustained from Wimbledon earlier that year. Nearly a month later, Williams had pulled out on the WTA Finals from a continuous injury.

== All matches ==
=== Singles matches ===
Tournament	Match	Round	Opponent	Rank	Result	Score
Australian Open; Melbourne, Australia; Grand Slam; Hard, outdoor 18–31 January 2016	861	1R	(Italy) Camila Giorgi	#36	Win	6–4, 7–5
Australian Open; Melbourne, Australia; Grand Slam; Hard, outdoor 18–31 January 2016	862	2R	(Chinese Taipei) Hsieh Su-wei	#90	Win	6–1, 6–2
Australian Open; Melbourne, Australia; Grand Slam; Hard, outdoor 18–31 January 2016	863	3R	(Russia) Daria Kasatkina	#69	Win	6–1, 6–1
Australian Open; Melbourne, Australia; Grand Slam; Hard, outdoor 18–31 January 2016	864	4R	(Russia) Margarita Gasparyan	#58	Win	6–2, 6–1
Australian Open; Melbourne, Australia; Grand Slam; Hard, outdoor 18–31 January 2016	865	QF	(Russia) Maria Sharapova	#5	Win	6–4, 6–1
Australian Open; Melbourne, Australia; Grand Slam; Hard, outdoor 18–31 January 2016	866	SF	(Poland) Agnieszka Radwańska	#4	Win	6–0, 6–4
Australian Open; Melbourne, Australia; Grand Slam; Hard, outdoor 18–31 January 2016	867	F	(Germany) Angelique Kerber	#6	Loss(1)	4–6, 6–3, 4–6
Indian Wells Masters; Indian Wells, United States; WTA Premier Mandatory; Hard, outdoor 7–20 March 2016	–	1R	Bye			
Indian Wells Masters; Indian Wells, United States; WTA Premier Mandatory; Hard, outdoor 7–20 March 2016	868	2R	(Germany) Laura Siegemund	#79	Win	6–2, 6–1
Indian Wells Masters; Indian Wells, United States; WTA Premier Mandatory; Hard, outdoor 7–20 March 2016	869	3R	(Kazakhstan) Yulia Putintseva	#56	Win	7–6^{(7–2)}, 6–0
Indian Wells Masters; Indian Wells, United States; WTA Premier Mandatory; Hard, outdoor 7–20 March 2016	870	4R	(Ukraine) Kateryna Bondarenko	#70	Win	6–2, 6–2
Indian Wells Masters; Indian Wells, United States; WTA Premier Mandatory; Hard, outdoor 7–20 March 2016	871	QF	(Romania) Simona Halep	#5	Win	6–4, 6–3
Indian Wells Masters; Indian Wells, United States; WTA Premier Mandatory; Hard, outdoor 7–20 March 2016	872	SF	(Poland) Agnieszka Radwańska	#3	Win	6–4, 7–6^{(7–1)}
Indian Wells Masters; Indian Wells, United States; WTA Premier Mandatory; Hard, outdoor 7–20 March 2016	873	F	(Belarus) Victoria Azarenka	#15	Loss(2)	4–6, 4–6
Miami Open; Miami, United States; WTA Premier Mandatory; Hard, outdoor 21 March – 3 April 2016	–	1R	Bye			
Miami Open; Miami, United States; WTA Premier Mandatory; Hard, outdoor 21 March – 3 April 2016	874	2R	(United States) Christina McHale	#56	Win	6–3, 5–7, 6–2
Miami Open; Miami, United States; WTA Premier Mandatory; Hard, outdoor 21 March – 3 April 2016	875	3R	(Kazakhstan) Zarina Diyas	#97	Win	7–5, 6–3
Miami Open; Miami, United States; WTA Premier Mandatory; Hard, outdoor 21 March – 3 April 2016	876	4R	(Russia) Svetlana Kuznetsova	#19	Loss(3)	7–6^{(7–3)}, 1–6, 2–6
Italian Open; Rome, Itay; WTA Premier 5 Clay, outdoor 9–15 May 2016	–	1R	Bye			
Italian Open; Rome, Itay; WTA Premier 5 Clay, outdoor 9–15 May 2016	877	2R	(Germany) Anna-Lena Friedsam	#50	Win	6–4, 6–3
Italian Open; Rome, Itay; WTA Premier 5 Clay, outdoor 9–15 May 2016	878	3R	(United States) Christina McHale	#56	Win	7–6^{(9–7)}, 6–1
Italian Open; Rome, Itay; WTA Premier 5 Clay, outdoor 9–15 May 2016	879	QF	(Russia) Svetlana Kuznetsova	#19	Win	6–2, 6–0
Italian Open; Rome, Itay; WTA Premier 5 Clay, outdoor 9–15 May 2016	880	SF	(Romania) Irina-Camelia Begu	#35	Win	6–4, 6–1
Italian Open; Rome, Itay; WTA Premier 5 Clay, outdoor 9–15 May 2016	881	F	(United States) Madison Keys	#24	Win (1)	7–6^{(7–5)}, 6–3
French Open; Paris, France; Grand Slam; Clay, outdoor 22 May – 5 June 2016	882	1R	(Slovakia) Magdaléna Rybáriková	#77	Win	6–2, 6–0
French Open; Paris, France; Grand Slam; Clay, outdoor 22 May – 5 June 2016	883	2R	(Brazil) Teliana Pereira	#81	Win	6–2, 6–1
French Open; Paris, France; Grand Slam; Clay, outdoor 22 May – 5 June 2016	884	3R	(France) Kristina Mladenovic	#30	Win	6–4, 7–6^{(12–10)}
French Open; Paris, France; Grand Slam; Clay, outdoor 22 May – 5 June 2016	885	4R	(Ukraine) Elina Svitolina	#20	Win	6–1, 6–1
French Open; Paris, France; Grand Slam; Clay, outdoor 22 May – 5 June 2016	886	QF	(Kazakhstan) Yulia Putintseva	#60	Win	5–7, 6–4, 6–1
French Open; Paris, France; Grand Slam; Clay, outdoor 22 May – 5 June 2016	887	SF	(Netherlands) Kiki Bertens	#58	Win	7–6^{(9–7)}, 6–4
French Open; Paris, France; Grand Slam; Clay, outdoor 22 May – 5 June 2016	888	F	(Spain) Garbiñe Muguruza	#4	Loss(4)	5–7, 4–6
Wimbledon Championships; London, United Kingdom; Grand Slam; Grass, outdoor 27 June – 10 July 2016	889	1R	(Switzerland) Amra Sadiković	#148	Win	6–2, 6–4
Wimbledon Championships; London, United Kingdom; Grand Slam; Grass, outdoor 27 June – 10 July 2016	890	2R	(United States) Christina McHale	#65	Win	6–7^{(7–9)}, 6–2, 6–4
Wimbledon Championships; London, United Kingdom; Grand Slam; Grass, outdoor 27 June – 10 July 2016	891	3R	(Germany) Annika Beck	#43	Win	6–3, 6–0
Wimbledon Championships; London, United Kingdom; Grand Slam; Grass, outdoor 27 June – 10 July 2016	892	4R	(Russia) Svetlana Kuznetsova	#14	Win	7–5, 6–0
Wimbledon Championships; London, United Kingdom; Grand Slam; Grass, outdoor 27 June – 10 July 2016	893	QF	(Russia) Anastasia Pavlyuchenkova	#23	Win	6–4, 6–4
Wimbledon Championships; London, United Kingdom; Grand Slam; Grass, outdoor 27 June – 10 July 2016	894	SF	(Russia) Elena Vesnina	#50	Win	6–2, 6–0
Wimbledon Championships; London, United Kingdom; Grand Slam; Grass, outdoor 27 June – 10 July 2016	895	F	(Germany) Angelique Kerber	#4	Win (2)	7–5, 6–3
2016 Summer Olympics; Rio de Janeiro, Brazil; Olympic Games; Hard, outdoor 6–13 August 2016	896	1R	(Australia) Daria Gavrilova	#45	Win	6–4, 6–2
2016 Summer Olympics; Rio de Janeiro, Brazil; Olympic Games; Hard, outdoor 6–13 August 2016	897	2R	(France) Alizé Cornet	#48	Win	7–6^{(7–5)}, 6–2
2016 Summer Olympics; Rio de Janeiro, Brazil; Olympic Games; Hard, outdoor 6–13 August 2016	898	3R	(Ukraine) Elina Svitolina	#20	Loss(5)	4–6, 3–6
US Open; New York City, United States; Grand Slam; Hard, outdoor 29 August – 11 September 2016	899	1R	(Russia) Ekaterina Makarova	#29	Win	6–3, 6–3
US Open; New York City, United States; Grand Slam; Hard, outdoor 29 August – 11 September 2016	900	2R	(United States) Vania King	#87	Win	6–3, 6–3
US Open; New York City, United States; Grand Slam; Hard, outdoor 29 August – 11 September 2016	901	3R	(Sweden) Johanna Larsson	#47	Win	6–2, 6–1
US Open; New York City, United States; Grand Slam; Hard, outdoor 29 August – 11 September 2016	902	4R	(Kazakhstan) Yaroslava Shvedova	#52	Win	6–2, 6–3
US Open; New York City, United States; Grand Slam; Hard, outdoor 29 August – 11 September 2016	903	QF	(Romania) Simona Halep	#5	Win	6–2, 4–6, 6–3
US Open; New York City, United States; Grand Slam; Hard, outdoor 29 August – 11 September 2016	904	SF	(Czech Republic) Karolína Plíšková	#11	Loss(6)	2–6, 6–7^{(5–7)}

=== Doubles matches ===
Tournament	Match	Round	Partner	Opponents	Rank	Result	Score
Internazionali BNL d'Italia; Rome, Italy; WTA Premier 5 Clay, Red; 9–15 May 2016	206	2R	(United States) Venus Williams	(Slovenia) Andreja Klepač; (Slovenia) Katarina Srebotnik	#37 #17	Loss	1–6, 5–7
French Open; Paris, France; Grand Slam; Clay, Red; 23 May – 5 June 2016	207	1R	(United States) Venus Williams	(Latvia) Jeļena Ostapenko; (Kazakhstan) Yulia Putintseva	#1080 #N/A	Win	6–2, 6–2
French Open; Paris, France; Grand Slam; Clay, Red; 23 May – 5 June 2016	208	2R	(United States) Venus Williams	(Russia) Vitalia Diatchenko; (Kazakhstan) Galina Voskoboeva	#194 #250	Win	7–6^{(10–8)}, 4–6, 6–0
French Open; Paris, France; Grand Slam; Clay, Red; 23 May – 5 June 2016	209	3R	(United States) Venus Williams	(Netherlands) Kiki Bertens; (Sweden) Johanna Larsson	#43 #42	Loss	3–6, 3–6
Wimbledon Championships; London, United Kingdom; Grand Slam; Grass, outdoor 27 June – 10 July 2016	210	1R	(United States) Venus Williams	(Slovenia) Andreja Klepač; (Slovenia) Katarina Srebotnik	#32 #28	Win	7–5, 6–3
Wimbledon Championships; London, United Kingdom; Grand Slam; Grass, outdoor 27 June – 10 July 2016	211	2R	(United States) Venus Williams	(Belgium) Elise Mertens; (Belgium) An-Sophie Mestach	#79 #81	Win	6–4, 6–4
Wimbledon Championships; London, United Kingdom; Grand Slam; Grass, outdoor 27 June – 10 July 2016	212	3R	(United States) Venus Williams	(Czech Republic) Andrea Hlaváčková; (Czech Republic) Lucie Hradecká	#11 #10	Win	6–4, 6–3
Wimbledon Championships; London, United Kingdom; Grand Slam; Grass, outdoor 27 June – 10 July 2016	213	QF	(United States) Venus Williams	(Russia) Ekaterina Makarova; (Russia) Elena Vesnina	#12 #7	Win	7–6^{(7–1)}, 4–6, 6–2
Wimbledon Championships; London, United Kingdom; Grand Slam; Grass, outdoor 27 June – 10 July 2016	214	SF	(United States) Venus Williams	(Germany) Julia Görges; (Czech Republic) Karolína Plíšková	#15 #19	Win	7–6^{(7–3)}, 6–4
Wimbledon Championships; London, United Kingdom; Grand Slam; Grass, outdoor 27 June – 10 July 2016	215	F	(United States) Venus Williams	(Hungary) Tímea Babos; (Kazakhstan) Yaroslava Shvedova	#13 #8	Win (1)	6–3, 6–4
2016 Summer Olympics; Rio de Janeiro, Brazil; Olympic Games; Hard, outdoor 6–13 August 2016	216	1R	(United States) Venus Williams	(Czech Republic) Lucie Šafářová (Czech Republic) Barbora Strýcová	#14 #42	Loss	3–6, 4–6

== Tournament schedule ==
=== Singles schedule ===
Williams' 2016 singles tournament schedule is as follows:

Date	Championship	Location	Category	Surface	2015 result	2015 points	2016 points	Outcome
18 January – 31 January	Australian Open	(Australia) Melbourne	Grand Slam	Hard	W	2000	1300	Final lost to (Germany) Angelique Kerber, 4–6, 6–3, 4–6
7 March – 20 March	Indian Wells Masters	(United States) Indian Wells	WTA Premier Mandatory	Hard	SF	650	650	Final lost to (Belarus) Victoria Azarenka, 4–6, 4–6
21 March – 3 April	Miami Masters	(United States) Miami	WTA Premier Mandatory	Hard	W	1000	120	Fourth Round lost to (Russia) Svetlana Kuznetsova, 7–6^{(7–3)}, 1–6, 2–6
29 April – 8 May	Madrid Open	(Spain) Madrid	WTA Premier Mandatory	Clay	SF	390	0	Withdrew before tournament began due to illness
9 May – 15 May	Italian Open	(Italy) Rome	WTA Premier 5	Clay	3R	105	900	Winner defeated (United States) Madison Keys, 7–6^{(7–5)}, 6–3
22 May – 5 June	French Open	(France) Paris	Grand Slam	Clay	W	2000	1300	Final lost to (Spain) Garbiñe Muguruza, 5–7, 4–6
27 June – 10 July	Wimbledon	(United Kingdom) London	Grand Slam	Grass	W	2000	2000	Winner defeated (Germany) Angelique Kerber, 7–5, 6–3
25 July – 31 July	Canadian Open	(Canada) Montreal	WTA Premier 5	Hard	SF	350	0	Withdrew before tournament began due to shoulder inflammation
6 August – 13 August	Summer Olympics	(Brazil) Rio de Janeiro	Olympic Games	Hard	NH	0	0	Third Round lost to (Ukraine) Elina Svitolina, 4–6, 3–6
15 August – 21 August	Western & Southern Open	(United States) Cincinnati	WTA Premier 5	Hard	W	900	0	Withdrew before tournament began due to shoulder injury
29 August – 11 September	US Open	(United States) New York City	Grand Slam	Hard	SF	780	780	Semifinals lost to (Czech Republic) Karolína Plíšková, 2–6, 6–7^{(5–7)}
Total year-end points						9945	7050	

=== Doubles schedule ===
Williams' 2016 doubles tournament schedule is as follows:

Date	Championship	Location	Category	Partner	Surface	Points	Outcome
9 May – 15 May	Italian Open	(Italy) Rome	WTA Premier 5	(United States) Venus Williams	Clay	1	First round lost to Klepač/Srebotnik, 1–6, 5–7
23 May 2016 – 5 June 2016	French Open	(France) Paris	Grand Slam	(United States) Venus Williams	Clay	240	Third round lost to Bertens/Larsson, 3–6, 3–6
27 June 2016– 10 July 2016	The Championships, Wimbledon	(United Kingdom) London	Grand Slam	(United States) Venus Williams	Grass	2000	Winner defeated Babos/Shvedova, 6–3, 6–4
6 August – 13 August	Summer Olympics	(Brazil) Rio de Janeiro	Olympic Games	(United States) Venus Williams	Hard	0	First Round lost to Lucie Šafářová/Barbora Strýcová, 3–6, 4–6
Total year-end points						2241	

=== Team events ===
==== Hopman Cup ====
Tournament	Round	Partner	Match	Opponents	Result	Score
Hopman Cup; Perth, Western Australia, Australia; Mixed round-robin Hard, outdoor 3–9 January 2016	RR	(United States) Jack Sock	Singles	(Australia) Jarmila Wolfe	Loss	5–7, 1–2 ret.

== Yearly records ==
=== Head-to-head matchups ===
Ordered by percentage of wins

- (United States) Christina McHale 3–0
- (Romania) Simona Halep 2–0
- (Kazakhstan) Yulia Putintseva 2–0
- (Poland) Agnieszka Radwańska 2–0
- (Germany) Annika Beck 1–0
- (Romania) Irina-Camelia Begu 1–0
- (Netherlands) Kiki Bertens 1–0
- (Ukraine) Kateryna Bondarenko 1–0
- (France) Alizé Cornet 1–0
- (Kazakhstan) Zarina Diyas 1–0
- (Germany) Anna-Lena Friedsam 1–0
- (Russia) Margarita Gasparyan 1–0
- (Australia) Daria Gavrilova 1–0
- (Italy) Camila Giorgi 1–0
- (Chinese Taipei) Hsieh Su-wei 1–0
- (Russia) Daria Kasatkina 1–0
- (United States) Madison Keys 1–0
- (United States) Vania King 1–0
- (Sweden) Johanna Larsson 1–0
- (Russia) Ekaterina Makarova 1–0
- (France) Kristina Mladenovic 1–0
- (Russia) Anastasia Pavlyuchenkova 1–0
- (Brazil) Teliana Pereira 1–0
- (Slovakia) Magdaléna Rybáriková 1–0
- (Switzerland) Amra Sadiković 1–0
- (Russia) Maria Sharapova 1–0
- (Kazakhstan) Yaroslava Shvedova 1–0
- (Germany) Laura Siegemund 1–0
- (Russia) Elena Vesnina 1–0
- (Russia) Svetlana Kuznetsova 2–1
- (Germany) Angelique Kerber 1–1
- (Ukraine) Elina Svitolina 1–1
- (Belarus) Victoria Azarenka 0–1
- (Spain) Garbiñe Muguruza 0–1
- (Czech Republic) Karolína Plíšková 0–1

=== Finals ===
==== Singles: 5 (2–3) ====
Legend Grand Slams (1–2) WTA Tour Championships (0–0) WTA Premier Mandatory (0–1) WTA Premier 5 (1–0) WTA Premier (0–0) WTA International (0–0)	Finals by surface Hard (0–2) Clay (1–1) Grass (1–0)	Finals by venue Outdoors (2–3) Indoors (0–0)

Outcome	No.	Date	Championship	Surface	Opponent in the final	Score in the final
Runner-up	18.	January 30, 2016	Australian Open, Melbourne, Australia	Hard	(Germany) Angelique Kerber	4–6, 6–3, 4–6
Runner-up	19.	March 20, 2016	BNP Paribas Open, Indian Wells, USA	Hard	(Belarus) Victoria Azarenka	4–6, 4–6
Winner	70.	May 15, 2016	Italian Open, Rome, Italy (4)	Clay (red)	(United States) Madison Keys	7–6^{(7–5)}, 6–3
Runner-up	20.	June 4, 2016	French Open, Paris, France	Clay	(Spain) Garbiñe Muguruza	5–7, 4–6
Winner	71.	July 9, 2016	Wimbledon, London, United Kingdom (7)	Grass	(Germany) Angelique Kerber	7–5, 6–3

==== Doubles: 1 (1–0) ====
Legend
Grand Slam tournaments (1–0)

Finals by surface
Grass (1–0)

Finals by venue
Outdoors (1–0)

Outcome	No.	Date	Championship	Surface	Partner	Opponent in the final	Score in the final
Winner	23.	July 9, 2016	Wimbledon, London, U.K. (6)	Grass	(United States) Venus Williams	(Hungary) Tímea Babos (Kazakhstan) Yaroslava Shvedova	6–3, 6–4

=== Earnings ===
#	Event	Prize money	Year-to-date
1	Australian Open	$1,276,870	$1,276,870
2	Indian Wells Masters	$501,815	$1,778,685
3	Miami Open	$67,590	$1,846,275
4	Italian Open (singles)	$535,804	$2,382,079
4	Italian Open (doubles)	$2,415	$2,384,494
5	French Open (singles)	$1,077,139	$3,461,633
5	French Open (doubles)	$19,927	$3,481,560
6	Wimbledon (singles)	$3,065,820	$6,547,380
6	Wimbledon (doubles)	$268,259	$6,815,639
7	US Open	$875,000	$7,690,639
			$7,690,639

== See also ==
- 2016 WTA Tour
- Serena Williams career statistics

Sporting positions
Preceded by Venus Williams; Angelique Kerber	World No. 1 First stint: July 8, 2002 – August 10, 2003; Last stint: April 24, 2017 – May 14, 2017	Succeeded by Kim Clijsters; Angelique Kerber
Preceded by Jennifer Capriati; Justine Henin; Petra Kvitová	Year-end World No. 1; 2002; 2008, 2009; 2012 – 2015	Succeeded by Justine Henin; Kim Clijsters; Angelique Kerber
Awards
Preceded by Jennifer Capriati; Jelena Janković; Petra Kvitová	ITF Women's Singles World Champion; 2002; 2009; 2012 – 2015	Succeeded by Justine Henin; Caroline Wozniacki; Angelique Kerber
Preceded by Martina Hingis & Anna Kournikova; Cara Black & Liezel Huber	WTA Doubles Team of the Year; 2000 (with Venus Williams); 2009 (with Venus Williams)	Succeeded by Lisa Raymond & Rennae Stubbs; Gisela Dulko & Flavia Pennetta
Preceded by Cara Black & Liezel Huber	ITF Women's Doubles World Champion; 2009 (with Venus Williams)	Succeeded by Gisela Dulko & Flavia Pennetta
