= 2016 Western & Southern Open – Women's doubles =

Women's doubles
- 2016 Western & Southern Open

Final
- Champions: (India) Sania Mirza (Czech Republic) Barbora Strýcová
- Runners-up: (Switzerland) Martina Hingis (United States) CoCo Vandeweghe
- Score: 7–5, 6–4

Details
- Seeds: 8

Events
Singles	men	women
Doubles	men	women
← 2015 ·	Western & Southern Open	· 2017 →

Chan Hao-ching and Chan Yung-jan were the defending champions, but lost in the semifinals to Sania Mirza and Barbora Strýcová.

Mirza and Strýcová went on to win the title, defeating Martina Hingis and CoCo Vandeweghe in the final, 7–5, 6–4.

== Seeds ==
The top four seeds received a bye into the second round.

1. (France) Caroline Garcia / (France) Kristina Mladenovic (second round)
2. (Chinese Taipei) Chan Hao-ching / (Chinese Taipei) Chan Yung-jan (semifinals)
3. (Hungary) Tímea Babos / (Kazakhstan) Yaroslava Shvedova (quarterfinals)
4. (Switzerland) Martina Hingis / (United States) CoCo Vandeweghe (final)
5. (Germany) Julia Görges / (Czech Republic) Karolína Plíšková (semifinals)
6. (United States) Raquel Atawo / (United States) Abigail Spears (quarterfinals)
7. (India) Sania Mirza / (Czech Republic) Barbora Strýcová (champions)
8. (China) Xu Yifan / (China) Zheng Saisai (second round)

== Draw ==
=== Key ===
- Q = Qualifier
- WC = Wild card
- LL = Lucky loser
- Alt = Alternate
- SE = Special exempt
- PR = Protected ranking
- ITF = ITF entry
- JE = Junior exempt
- w/o = Walkover
- r = Retired
- d = Defaulted
- SR = Special ranking

=== Finals ===
Semifinals
5	(Germany) Julia Görges (Czech Republic) Karolína Plíšková	1	4
4	(Switzerland) Martina Hingis (United States) CoCo Vandeweghe	6	6
7	(India) Sania Mirza (Czech Republic) Barbora Strýcová	6	7
2	(Chinese Taipei) Chan Hao-ching (Chinese Taipei) Chan Yung-jan	2	5

Final
4	(Switzerland) Martina Hingis (United States) CoCo Vandeweghe	5	4
7	(India) Sania Mirza (Czech Republic) Barbora Strýcová	7	6

=== Top half ===
First round
(United States) V King (Romania) M Niculescu	7^{7}	6
(China) C Liang (China) Y Wang	6^{4}	3
(Germany) A-L Grönefeld (Czech Republic) K Peschke	6	7
(Slovenia) A Klepač (Slovenia) K Srebotnik	2	5
(Ukraine) K Bondarenko (Chinese Taipei) C-j Chuang	1	7^{7}	[10]
5	(Germany) J Görges (Czech Republic) Ka Plíšková	6	6^{1}	[12]
WC	(Switzerland) B Bencic (Belgium) K Flipkens	4	1
(Netherlands) K Bertens (Sweden) J Larsson	6	6
(Italy) S Errani (Spain) C Suárez Navarro	6	6
(Romania) R Olaru (Czech Republic) R Voráčová	3	2
(Spain) L Arruabarrena (Ukraine) O Savchuk	4	2
8	(China) Y Xu (China) S Zheng	6	6

Second round
1	(France) C Garcia (France) K Mladenovic	6	2	[4]
(United States) V King (Romania) M Niculescu	3	6	[10]
(Germany) A-L Grönefeld (Czech Republic) K Peschke	7^{11}	5	[8]
5	(Germany) J Görges (Czech Republic) Ka Plíšková	6^{9}	7	[10]
4	(Switzerland) M Hingis (United States) C Vandeweghe	^{w/o}
(Netherlands) K Bertens (Sweden) J Larsson
(Italy) S Errani (Spain) C Suárez Navarro	6	6
8	(China) Y Xu (China) S Zheng	4	2

Quarterfinals
(United States) V King (Romania) M Niculescu	4	4
5	(Germany) J Görges (Czech Republic) Ka Plíšková	6	6
4	(Switzerland) M Hingis (United States) C Vandeweghe	^{w/o}
(Italy) S Errani (Spain) C Suárez Navarro

Semifinals
5	(Germany) J Görges (Czech Republic) Ka Plíšková	1	4
4	(Switzerland) M Hingis (United States) C Vandeweghe	6	6

=== Bottom half ===
First round
7	(India) S Mirza (Czech Republic) B Strýcová	6	6
(Croatia) D Jurak (Australia) An Rodionova	2	3
WC	(United States) L Davis (United States) V Lepchenko	5	2
(United States) C McHale (United States) M Sanchez	7	6
(Spain) A Medina Garrigues (Spain) A Parra Santonja	2	6	[11]
(United States) N Melichar (Thailand) V Wongteanchai	6	4	[9]
6	(United States) R Atawo (United States) A Spears	6^{4}	6	[10]
(Canada) G Dabrowski (Spain) MJ Martínez Sánchez	7^{7}	3	[7]
WC	(Australia) D Gavrilova (Russia) D Kasatkina	4	6^{2}
(Japan) E Hozumi (Japan) M Kato	6	7^{7}
(Ukraine) L Kichenok (Ukraine) N Kichenok	4	6	[3]
(Argentina) M Irigoyen (Georgia (country)) O Kalashnikova	6	2	[10]

Second round
7	(India) S Mirza (Czech Republic) B Strýcová	6	6
(United States) C McHale (United States) M Sanchez	4	4
(Spain) A Medina Garrigues (Spain) A Parra Santonja	2	0
3	(Hungary) T Babos (Kazakhstan) Y Shvedova	6	6
6	(United States) R Atawo (United States) A Spears	4	6	[10]
(Japan) E Hozumi (Japan) M Kato	6	1	[6]
(Argentina) M Irigoyen (Georgia (country)) O Kalashnikova	0	6	[7]
2	(Chinese Taipei) H-c Chan (Chinese Taipei) Y-j Chan	6	1	[10]

Quarterfinals
7	(India) S Mirza (Czech Republic) B Strýcová	7^{7}	6
3	(Hungary) T Babos (Kazakhstan) Y Shvedova	6^{4}	1
6	(United States) R Atawo (United States) A Spears	5	6	[8]
2	(Chinese Taipei) H-c Chan (Chinese Taipei) Y-j Chan	7	2	[10]

Semifinals
7	(India) S Mirza (Czech Republic) B Strýcová	6	7
2	(Chinese Taipei) H-c Chan (Chinese Taipei) Y-j Chan	2	5
