= 2016 Western & Southern Open – Men's singles =

Men's singles
- 2016 Western & Southern Open

Final
- Champion: (Croatia) Marin Čilić
- Runner-up: (United Kingdom) Andy Murray
- Score: 6–4, 7–5

Details
- Draw: 64 (7Q / 4WC)
- Seeds: 16

Events
Singles	men	women
Doubles	men	women
- Western & Southern Open

Marin Čilić defeated Andy Murray in the final, 6–4, 7–5 to win the men's singles tennis title at the 2016 Cincinnati Masters. It was his first Masters 1000 title, ending a streak of 18 consecutive Masters events won by the Big Four.

Roger Federer was the two-time reigning champion, but withdrew due to a knee injury.

== Seeds ==
The top eight seeds receive a bye into the second round.

1. (United Kingdom) Andy Murray (final)
2. (Switzerland) Stan Wawrinka (third round)
3. (Spain) Rafael Nadal (third round)
4. (Canada) Milos Raonic (semifinal)
5. (Japan) Kei Nishikori (third round)
6. (Czech Republic) Tomáš Berdych (third round)
7. (France) Jo-Wilfried Tsonga (third round)
8. (Austria) Dominic Thiem (quarterfinals)

9. (France) Gaël Monfils (third round, withdrew due to back injury)
10. (Spain) David Ferrer (first round)
11. (Belgium) David Goffin (second round)
12. (Croatia) Marin Čilić (champion)
13. (France) Richard Gasquet (second round)
14. (Australia) Nick Kyrgios (second round)
15. (Spain) Roberto Bautista Agut (first round)
16. (Spain) Feliciano López (second round)

Click on the seed number of a player to go to their draw section.

== Draw ==
Key

- Q = Qualifier
- WC = Wild card
- LL = Lucky loser
- Alt = Alternate
- ITF = ITF entry
- PR = Protected ranking
- SR = Special ranking
- SE = Special exempt
- JE = Junior exempt
- JR = Junior Accelerator Programme entrant
- CO = College Accelerator Programme entrant
- NG = Next Gen Accelerator Program entrant
- w/o = Walkover
- r = Retired
- d = Defaulted

=== Finals ===
Quarterfinals
1	(United Kingdom) Andy Murray	6	6
(Australia) Bernard Tomic	4	4
4	(Canada) Milos Raonic	6	6
8	(Austria) Dominic Thiem	3	4
12	(Croatia) Marin Čilić	6	0
(Croatia) Borna Ćorić	2	0^{r}
(United States) Steve Johnson	6^{8}	2
(Bulgaria) Grigor Dimitrov	7^{10}	6

Semifinals
1	(United Kingdom) Andy Murray	6	6
4	(Canada) Milos Raonic	3	3
12	(Croatia) Marin Čilić	4	6	7
(Bulgaria) Grigor Dimitrov	6	3	5

Final
1	(United Kingdom) Andy Murray	4	5
12	(Croatia) Marin Čilić	6	7

=== Top half ===
==== Section 1 ====
First round
(Croatia) I Karlović	4	4
PR	(Argentina) J Mónaco	6	6
(Ukraine) A Dolgopolov	5	0^{r}
(South Africa) K Anderson	7	0
LL	(France) A Mannarino	6^{2}	6	1
13	(France) R Gasquet	7^{7}	3	6
11	(Belgium) D Goffin	7	6
Q	(Georgia (country)) N Basilashvili	5	3
(Portugal) J Sousa	4	3
(Australia) B Tomic	6	6
WC	(United States) T Fritz	1	3
Q	(Russia) M Youzhny	6	6

Second round
1	(United Kingdom) A Murray	6	6
PR	(Argentina) J Mónaco	3	2
(South Africa) K Anderson	6	6
13	(France) R Gasquet	2	4
11	(Belgium) D Goffin	6	5	4
(Australia) B Tomic	3	7	6
Q	(Russia) M Youzhny	3	2
5	(Japan) K Nishikori	6	6

Third round
1	(United Kingdom) A Murray	6	6
(South Africa) K Anderson	3	2
(Australia) B Tomic	7^{7}	7^{7}
5	(Japan) K Nishikori	6^{1}	6^{5}

Quarterfinals
1	(United Kingdom) A Murray	6	6
(Australia) B Tomic	4	4

==== Section 2 ====
First round
(Italy) F Fognini	3	2
(United States) J Isner	6	6
Q	(Japan) Y Sugita	6^{4}	6	6
(Germany) A Zverev	7^{7}	4	2
(France) N Mahut	7^{7}	2	6
15	(Spain) R Bautista Agut	6^{2}	6	3
9	(France) G Monfils	6	6
(Spain) P Carreño Busta	3	4
(Cyprus) M Baghdatis	7	7
(Canada) V Pospisil	5	5
Q	(Tunisia) M Jaziri	4	7	3
Q	(Australia) J Millman	6	5	6

Second round
4	(Canada) M Raonic	7^{7}	7^{7}
(United States) J Isner	6^{5}	6^{5}
Q	(Japan) Y Sugita	6	7
(France) N Mahut	3	5
9	(France) G Monfils	7	6
(Cyprus) M Baghdatis	5	0
Q	(Australia) J Millman	5	1
8	(Austria) D Thiem	7	6

Third round
4	(Canada) M Raonic	6	3	6
Q	(Japan) Y Sugita	1	6	1
9	(France) G Monfils
8	(Austria) D Thiem	w/o

Quarterfinals
4	(Canada) M Raonic	6	6
8	(Austria) D Thiem	3	4

=== Bottom half ===
==== Section 3 ====
First round
Q	(Czech Republic) J Veselý	4	7^{7}	2
(Spain) M Granollers	6	6^{5}	6
WC	(Spain) F Verdasco	7^{7}	6
(Spain) A Ramos Viñolas	6^{5}	4
(Serbia) V Troicki	3	4
12	(Croatia) M Čilić	6	6
14	(Australia) N Kyrgios	6	7
(France) L Pouille	2	5
(Croatia) B Ćorić	1	6	6
(France) B Paire	6	3	4
(Uruguay) P Cuevas	4	7^{7}	6
(United States) S Querrey	6	6^{5}	3

Second round
6	(Czech Republic) T Berdych	6	7^{7}
(Spain) M Granollers	3	6^{4}
WC	(Spain) F Verdasco	3	1
12	(Croatia) M Čilić	6	6
14	(Australia) N Kyrgios	6^{2}	6	6^{6}
(Croatia) B Ćorić	7^{7}	4	7^{8}
(Uruguay) P Cuevas	1	6^{4}
3	(Spain) R Nadal	6	7^{7}

Third round
6	(Czech Republic) T Berdych	3	6	4
12	(Croatia) M Čilić	6	4	6
(Croatia) B Ćorić	6	6
3	(Spain) R Nadal	1	3

Quarterfinals
12	(Croatia) M Čilić	6	0
(Croatia) B Ćorić	2	0^{r}

==== Section 4 ====
First round
WC	(United States) R Opelka	3	7	7^{11}
(France) J Chardy	6	5	6^{9}
(United States) S Johnson	6	7
(Argentina) F Delbonis	4	5
PR	(France) J Benneteau	6	2	6
10	(Spain) D Ferrer	4	6	4
16	(Spain) F López	6	6
Q	(Germany) M Zverev	3	1
(France) G Simon	1	3
(Bulgaria) G Dimitrov	6	6
WC	(United States) J Donaldson	6	7^{7}
(Spain) N Almagro	3	6^{2}

Second round
7	(France) J-W Tsonga	7^{7}	7^{7}
WC	(United States) R Opelka	6^{5}	6^{3}
(United States) S Johnson	3	6	7^{7}
PR	(France) J Benneteau	6	2	6^{5}
16	(Spain) F López	7	3	6^{6}
(Bulgaria) G Dimitrov	5	6	7^{8}
WC	(United States) J Donaldson	6	3	4
2	(Switzerland) S Wawrinka	2	6	6

Third round
7	(France) J-W Tsonga	3	6^{6}
(United States) S Johnson	6	7^{8}
(Bulgaria) G Dimitrov	6	6
2	(Switzerland) S Wawrinka	4	4

Quarterfinals
(United States) S Johnson	6^{8}	2
(Bulgaria) G Dimitrov	7^{10}	6

== Qualifying ==
=== Seeds ===
1. (Czech Republic) Jiří Veselý (qualified)
2. (Argentina) Guido Pella (first round)
3. (Russia) Mikhail Youzhny (qualified)
4. (France) Stéphane Robert (first round)
5. (Tunisia) Malek Jaziri (qualified)
6. (Portugal) Gastão Elias (qualifying competition)
7. (Ukraine) Illya Marchenko (first round)
8. (Chinese Taipei) Lu Yen-hsun (first round)
9. (France) Adrian Mannarino (qualifying competition, lucky loser)
10. (Argentina) Diego Schwartzman (first round)
11. (France) Paul-Henri Mathieu (first round)
12. (Australia) John Millman (qualified)
13. (Bosnia and Herzegovina) Damir Džumhur (first round)
14. (Croatia) Ivan Dodig (first round)

=== Qualifiers ===
1. (Czech Republic) Jiří Veselý
2. (Japan) Yūichi Sugita
3. (Russia) Mikhail Youzhny
4. (Australia) John Millman
5. (Tunisia) Malek Jaziri
6. (Georgia (country)) Nikoloz Basilashvili
7. (Germany) Mischa Zverev

=== Lucky losers ===
1. (France) Adrian Mannarino

=== Qualifying draw ===
==== First qualifier ====
First round
1	(Czech Republic) Jiří Veselý	6	6
(United States) Tim Smyczek	4	2
(Brazil) Thiago Monteiro	7^{7}	6
14	(Croatia) Ivan Dodig	6^{3}	3

Qualifying competition
1	(Czech Republic) Jiří Veselý	6^{5}	6	6
(Brazil) Thiago Monteiro	7^{7}	1	4

==== Second qualifier ====
First round
2	(Argentina) Guido Pella	1	7	5
(Japan) Yūichi Sugita	6	5	7
(United Kingdom) Kyle Edmund	2	7^{7}	7^{7}
8	(Chinese Taipei) Lu Yen-hsun	6	6^{3}	6^{4}

Qualifying competition
(Japan) Yūichi Sugita	6	6
(United Kingdom) Kyle Edmund	4	3

==== Third qualifier ====
First round
3	(Russia) Mikhail Youzhny	6	6
(Lithuania) Ričardas Berankis	3	4
WC	(United States) Brian Baker	6	6
10	(Argentina) Diego Schwartzman	2	4

Qualifying competition
3	(Russia) Mikhail Youzhny	6	6
WC	(United States) Brian Baker	4	1

==== Fourth qualifier ====
First round
4	(France) Stéphane Robert	5	6	6^{6}
(Czech Republic) Lukáš Rosol	7	2	7^{8}
WC	(United States) Ryan Harrison	6	6^{3}	4
12	(Australia) John Millman	4	7^{7}	6

Qualifying competition
(Czech Republic) Lukáš Rosol	3	3
12	(Australia) John Millman	6	6

==== Fifth qualifier ====
First round
5	(Tunisia) Malek Jaziri	7	7
(Russia) Evgeny Donskoy	5	5
WC	(United States) Stefan Kozlov	6	3	7
13	(Bosnia and Herzegovina) Damir Džumhur	4	6	5

Qualifying competition
5	(Tunisia) Malek Jaziri	6	6
WC	(United States) Stefan Kozlov	4	2

==== Sixth qualifier ====
First round
6	(Portugal) Gastão Elias	6	6
(Australia) Luke Saville	4	2
(Georgia (country)) Nikoloz Basilashvili	6	7
11	(France) Paul-Henri Mathieu	1	5

Qualifying competition
6	(Portugal) Gastão Elias	3	2
(Georgia (country)) Nikoloz Basilashvili	6	6

==== Seventh qualifier ====
First round
7	(Ukraine) Illya Marchenko	4	3
Alt	(Germany) Mischa Zverev	6	6
Alt	(France) Quentin Halys	4	3
9	(France) Adrian Mannarino	6	6

Qualifying competition
Alt	(Germany) Mischa Zverev	7^{7}	7
9	(France) Adrian Mannarino	6^{4}	5
