= 2016 Western & Southern Open – Women's singles =

Women's singles
- 2016 Western & Southern Open

Final
- Champion: (Czech Republic) Karolína Plíšková
- Runner-up: (Germany) Angelique Kerber
- Score: 6–3, 6–1

Details
- Draw: 56 (12 Q / 2 WC )
- Seeds: 16

Events
Singles	men	women
Doubles	men	women
- Western & Southern Open

Karolína Plíšková defeated Angelique Kerber in the final, 6–3, 6–1 to win the women's singles tennis title at the 2016 Cincinnati Masters. It was her sixth WTA Tour singles title. The two would play each other three weeks later, in the final of the US Open; Kerber would avenge her loss by beating Plíšková in three sets.

Serena Williams was the two-time reigning champion, but withdrew before the tournament due to injury.

Kerber was in contention for the world No. 1 ranking, which she would have attained had she won the title. However, by losing in the final she remained No. 2.

== Seeds ==
All seeds received a bye into the second round.

1. (United States) Serena Williams (withdrew)
2. (Germany) Angelique Kerber (final)
3. (Romania) Simona Halep (semifinals)
4. (Spain) Garbiñe Muguruza (semifinals)
5. (Poland) Agnieszka Radwańska (quarterfinals)
6. (Italy) Roberta Vinci (third round)
7. (Russia) Svetlana Kuznetsova (quarterfinals)
8. (Slovakia) Dominika Cibulková (third round)
9. (Spain) Carla Suárez Navarro (quarterfinals)

10. (United Kingdom) Johanna Konta (third round)
11. (Czech Republic) Petra Kvitová (withdrew)
12. (Switzerland) Timea Bacsinszky (third round)
13. (Switzerland) Belinda Bencic (second round)
14. (Australia) Samantha Stosur (second round)
15. (Czech Republic) Karolína Plíšková (champion)
16. (Russia) Anastasia Pavlyuchenkova (third round)
17. (Ukraine) Elina Svitolina (second round)

Click on the seed number of a player to go to their draw section.

== Draw ==
Key

- Q = Qualifier
- WC = Wild card
- LL = Lucky loser
- Alt = Alternate
- ITF = ITF entry
- PR = Protected ranking
- SR = Special ranking
- SE = Special exempt
- JE = Junior exempt
- JR = Junior Accelerator Programme entrant
- CO = College Accelerator Programme entrant
- NG = Next Gen Accelerator Program entrant
- w/o = Walkover
- r = Retired
- d = Defaulted

=== Finals ===
Quarterfinals
15	(Czech Republic) Karolína Plíšková	6	4	6
7	(Russia) Svetlana Kuznetsova	3	6	2
4	(Spain) Garbiñe Muguruza	6	6
Q	(Hungary) Tímea Babos	4	3
5	(Poland) Agnieszka Radwańska	5	1
3	(Romania) Simona Halep	7	6
9	(Spain) Carla Suárez Navarro	6	3	0
2	(Germany) Angelique Kerber	4	6	6

Semifinals
15	(Czech Republic) Karolína Plíšková	6	6
4	(Spain) Garbiñe Muguruza	1	3
3	(Romania) Simona Halep	3	4
2	(Germany) Angelique Kerber	6	6

Final
15	(Czech Republic) Karolína Plíšková	6	6
2	(Germany) Angelique Kerber	3	1

=== Top half ===
==== Section 1 ====
First round
Q	(China) S Zheng	2	2
WC	(United States) C McHale	6	6
(Latvia) J Ostapenko	1	7^{8}	7^{7}
(Slovakia) AK Schmiedlová	6	6^{6}	6^{5}
Q	(China) S Zhang	3	3
(Ukraine) L Tsurenko	6	6
Q	(United States) A Riske	6	7^{8}
Q	(Russia) V Flink	4	6^{6}

Second round
LL	(Japan) M Doi	2	6	6
WC	(United States) C McHale	6	3	4
(Latvia) J Ostapenko	4	1
15	(Czech Republic) Ka Plíšková	6	6
12	(Switzerland) T Bacsinszky	6	6
(Ukraine) L Tsurenko	3	0
Q	(United States) A Riske	6	3	1
7	(Russia) S Kuznetsova	3	6	6

Third round
LL	(Japan) M Doi	5	3
15	(Czech Republic) Ka Plíšková	7	6
12	(Switzerland) T Bacsinszky	2	6	2
7	(Russia) S Kuznetsova	6	3	6

Quarterfinals
15	(Czech Republic) Ka Plíšková	6	4	6
7	(Russia) S Kuznetsova	3	6	2

==== Section 2 ====
First round
(Italy) S Errani	6	3	4
(United States) C Vandeweghe	4	6	6
LL	(Switzerland) V Golubic	4	6	5
Q	(Japan) K Nara	6	4	7
WC	(United States) L Chirico	4	4
Q	(Hungary) T Babos	6	6
LL	(Sweden) J Larsson	6	4	6
(Romania) I-C Begu	3	6	3

Second round
4	(Spain) G Muguruza	7^{7}	6
(United States) C Vandeweghe	6^{4}	2
Q	(Japan) K Nara	6^{5}	1
16	(Russia) A Pavlyuchenkova	7^{7}	6
13	(Switzerland) B Bencic	5	2
Q	(Hungary) T Babos	7	6
LL	(Sweden) J Larsson	7^{7}	4	5
8	(Slovakia) D Cibulková	6^{5}	6	7

Third round
4	(Spain) G Muguruza	7	6
16	(Russia) A Pavlyuchenkova	5	1
Q	(Hungary) T Babos	4	6	6
8	(Slovakia) D Cibulková	6	3	1

Quarterfinals
4	(Spain) G Muguruza	6	6
Q	(Hungary) T Babos	4	3

=== Bottom half ===
==== Section 3 ====
First round
(Germany) A Petkovic	6	6^{4}	6
(Czech Republic) L Šafářová	4	7^{7}	2
Q	(Croatia) D Vekić	6	6
(Serbia) A Ivanovic	4	2
(France) C Garcia	5	3
Q	(Australia) D Gavrilova	7	6
Q	(Germany) A Beck	6	6
(Kazakhstan) Y Putintseva	2	3

Second round
5	(Poland) A Radwańska	6	6
(Germany) A Petkovic	0	1
Q	(Croatia) D Vekić	2	3
10	(United Kingdom) J Konta	6	6
17	(Ukraine) E Svitolina	2	2
Q	(Australia) D Gavrilova	6	6
Q	(Germany) A Beck	3	1
3	(Romania) S Halep	6	6

Third round
5	(Poland) A Radwańska	6^{1}	6	6
10	(United Kingdom) J Konta	7^{7}	4	0
Q	(Australia) D Gavrilova	1	2
3	(Romania) S Halep	6	6

Quarterfinals
5	(Poland) A Radwańska	5	1
3	(Romania) S Halep	7	6

==== Section 4 ====
First round
LL	(Bulgaria) T Pironkova	6	6
(Russia) D Kasatkina	1	1
Q	(France) A Cornet	7^{7}	6
(Netherlands) K Bertens	6^{1}	3
(Czech Republic) B Strýcová	6	6
Q	(Canada) E Bouchard	4	0
Q	(Ukraine) K Bondarenko	6^{1}	3
(France) K Mladenovic	7^{7}	6

Second round
6	(Italy) R Vinci	7	6
LL	(Bulgaria) T Pironkova	5	3
Q	(France) A Cornet	2	0^{r}
9	(Spain) C Suárez Navarro	6	1
14	(Australia) S Stosur	6^{11}	3
(Czech Republic) B Strýcová	7^{13}	6
(France) K Mladenovic	0	5
2	(Germany) A Kerber	6	7

Third round
6	(Italy) R Vinci	1	5
9	(Spain) C Suárez Navarro	6	7
(Czech Republic) B Strýcová	6^{5}	4
2	(Germany) A Kerber	7^{7}	6

Quarterfinals
9	(Spain) C Suárez Navarro	6	3	0
2	(Germany) A Kerber	4	6	6

== Qualifying ==
=== Seeds ===
1. (Japan) Misaki Doi (qualifying competition, lucky loser)
2. (Canada) Eugenie Bouchard (qualified)
3. (Hungary) Tímea Babos (qualified)
4. (Germany) Annika Beck (qualified)
5. (Australia) Daria Gavrilova (qualified)
6. (Kazakhstan) Yaroslava Shvedova (first round)
7. (France) Alizé Cornet (qualified)
8. (China) Zhang Shuai (qualified)
9. (Latvia) Anastasija Sevastova (first round)
10. (Montenegro) Danka Kovinić (first round)
11. (United States) Varvara Lepchenko (first round)
12. (Romania) Monica Niculescu (first round)
13. (Belgium) Kirsten Flipkens (first round)
14. (Ukraine) Kateryna Bondarenko (qualified)
15. (China) Zheng Saisai (qualified)
16. (Germany) Julia Görges (first round)
17. (China) Wang Qiang (first round)
18. (Italy) Camila Giorgi (first round)
19. (United States) Alison Riske (qualified)
20. (Sweden) Johanna Larsson (qualifying competition, lucky loser)
21. (Switzerland) Viktorija Golubic (qualifying competition, lucky loser)
22. (Turkey) Çağla Büyükakçay (first round)
23. (Japan) Nao Hibino (first round)
24. (Bulgaria) Tsvetana Pironkova (qualifying competition, lucky loser)

=== Qualifiers ===
1. (Russia) Varvara Flink
2. (Canada) Eugenie Bouchard
3. (Hungary) Tímea Babos
4. (Germany) Annika Beck
5. (Australia) Daria Gavrilova
6. (United States) Alison Riske
7. (France) Alizé Cornet
8. (China) Zhang Shuai
9. (China) Zheng Saisai
10. (Ukraine) Kateryna Bondarenko
11. (Croatia) Donna Vekić
12. (Japan) Kurumi Nara

=== Lucky losers ===
1. (Japan) Misaki Doi
2. (Switzerland) Viktorija Golubic
3. (Sweden) Johanna Larsson
4. (Bulgaria) Tsvetana Pironkova

=== Qualifying draw ===
==== First qualifier ====
First round
1	(Japan) Misaki Doi	6	6^{9}	6
WC	(United States) Jessica Pegula	4	7^{11}	3
WC	(Russia) Varvara Flink	6	6
22	(Turkey) Çağla Büyükakçay	4	1

Qualifying competition
1	(Japan) Misaki Doi	6	6^{5}	4
WC	(Russia) Varvara Flink	0	7^{7}	6

==== Second qualifier ====
First round
2/WC	(Canada) Eugenie Bouchard	6	6
(Germany) Carina Witthöft	4	1
(United States) Lauren Davis	2	4
21	(Switzerland) Viktorija Golubic	6	6

Qualifying competition
2/WC	(Canada) Eugenie Bouchard	6	6
21	(Switzerland) Viktorija Golubic	4	2

==== Third qualifier ====
First round
3	(Hungary) Tímea Babos	6	6
(Russia) Evgeniya Rodina	3	4
WC	(United States) Jennifer Brady	6	3	7^{7}
17	(China) Wang Qiang	3	6	6^{4}

Qualifying competition
3	(Hungary) Tímea Babos	7^{7}	5	6
WC	(United States) Jennifer Brady	6^{4}	7	3

==== Fourth qualifier ====
First round
4	(Germany) Annika Beck	6	4	6
(Spain) Lara Arruabarrena	1	6	4
(Ukraine) Kateryna Kozlova	7^{8}	4	2
24	(Bulgaria) Tsvetana Pironkova	6^{6}	6	6

Qualifying competition
4	(Germany) Annika Beck	6	6
24	(Bulgaria) Tsvetana Pironkova	4	2

==== Fifth qualifier ====
First round
5	(Australia) Daria Gavrilova	6	6
(Germany) Mona Barthel	0	4
(Japan) Naomi Osaka	6	6
16	(Germany) Julia Görges	4	4

Qualifying competition
5	(Australia) Daria Gavrilova	6	6
(Japan) Naomi Osaka	4	2

==== Sixth qualifier ====
First round
6	(Kazakhstan) Yaroslava Shvedova	7	2	6^{7}
(Croatia) Ana Konjuh	5	6	7^{9}
(Poland) Magda Linette	6	4	4
19	(United States) Alison Riske	1	6	6

Qualifying competition
(Croatia) Ana Konjuh	7^{8}	2	2
19	(United States) Alison Riske	6^{6}	6	6

==== Seventh qualifier ====
First round
7	(France) Alizé Cornet	6	2	6
(Estonia) Anett Kontaveit	4	6	3
(Romania) Sorana Cîrstea	2	6	6
23	(Japan) Nao Hibino	6	3	2

Qualifying competition
7	(France) Alizé Cornet	7	3	6
(Romania) Sorana Cîrstea	5	6	1

==== Eighth qualifier ====
First round
8	(China) Zhang Shuai	6	6
(United States) Samantha Crawford	3	1
(Belarus) Aliaksandra Sasnovich	7^{9}	6^{7}	1
20	(Sweden) Johanna Larsson	6^{7}	7^{9}	6

Qualifying competition
8	(China) Zhang Shuai	6	6
20	(Sweden) Johanna Larsson	3	3

==== Ninth qualifier ====
First round
9	(Latvia) Anastasija Sevastova	3	6^{4}
(Germany) Sabine Lisicki	6	7^{7}
(Greece) Maria Sakkari	4	3
15	(China) Zheng Saisai	6	6

Qualifying competition
(Germany) Sabine Lisicki	3	2
15	(China) Zheng Saisai	6	6

==== Tenth qualifier ====
First round
10	(Montenegro) Danka Kovinić	2	6	4
WC	(United States) Jamie Loeb	6	1	6
WC	(United States) Sofia Kenin	1	2
14	(Ukraine) Kateryna Bondarenko	6	6

Qualifying competition
WC	(United States) Jamie Loeb	6	3	2
14	(Ukraine) Kateryna Bondarenko	3	6	6

==== Eleventh qualifier ====
First round
11	(United States) Varvara Lepchenko	6^{6}	6^{4}
(Croatia) Donna Vekić	7^{8}	7^{7}
(Colombia) Mariana Duque Mariño	7	6
13	(Belgium) Kirsten Flipkens	5	4

Qualifying competition
(Croatia) Donna Vekić	6	7^{7}
(Colombia) Mariana Duque Mariño	1	6^{2}

==== Twelfth qualifier ====
First round
12	(Romania) Monica Niculescu	6^{6}	3
(Japan) Kurumi Nara	7^{8}	6
PR	(Italy) Karin Knapp	7^{7}	3	6
18	(Italy) Camila Giorgi	6^{0}	6	4

Qualifying competition
(Japan) Kurumi Nara	6	7
PR	(Italy) Karin Knapp	1	5
