= 2016 Western & Southern Open =

- Date: August 15–21
- Edition: 115th (men) / 88th (women)
- Category: ATP World Tour Masters 1000 (men); WTA Premier 5 (women)
- Surface: Hard
- Location: Mason, Ohio, United States
- Venue: Lindner Family Tennis Center

Champions

Men's singles
- (Croatia) Marin Čilić

Women's singles
- (Czech Republic) Karolína Plíšková

Men's doubles
- (Croatia) Ivan Dodig / (Brazil) Marcelo Melo

Women's doubles
- (India) Sania Mirza / (Czech Republic) Barbora Strýcová
← 2015 ·	Cincinnati Masters	· 2017 →

The 2016 Western & Southern Open was a men's and women's tennis tournament played on outdoor hard courts from August 15–21, 2016. It was a Masters 1000 tournament on the 2016 ATP World Tour and a WTA Premier 5 tournament on the 2016 WTA Tour. The tournament was one of two headline events in the 2016 US Open Series. The 2016 tournament was the 115th men's edition and the 88th women's edition of the Cincinnati Masters. The tournament is held annually at the Lindner Family Tennis Center in Mason (a northern suburb of Cincinnati), Ohio, United States.

Roger Federer and Serena Williams were the two-time defending champions in Men's and Women's singles titles, but neither of them defended their titles. They withdrew due to a knee injury and shoulder inflammation, respectively.

== Points and prize money ==
=== Point distribution ===
Event	W	F	SF	QF	Round of 16	Round of 32	Round of 64	Q	Q2	Q1
Men's singles	1000	600	360	180	90	45	10	25	16	0
Men's doubles	1000	600	360	180	90	0	—	—	—	—
Women's singles	900	585	350	190	105	60	1	30	20	1
Women's doubles	900	585	350	190	105	5	—	—	—	—

=== Prize money ===
Event	W	F	SF	QF	Round of 16	Round of 32	Round of 64	Q2	Q1
Men's singles	$834,000	$409,270	$205,980	$104,740	$54,390	$28,675	$15,480	$3,570	$1,820
Women's singles	$515,000	$247,320	$123,665	$58,390	$29,320	$15,205	$12,205	$3,230	$1,960
Men's doubles	$258,500	$126,550	$63,470	$32,580	$16,840	$8,890	—	—	—
Women's doubles	$147,700	$74,600	$36,670	$18,590	$9,415	$4,650	—	—	—

== ATP singles main-draw entrants ==
=== Seeds ===
Country	Player	Ranking	Seed
GBR	Andy Murray	2	1
SUI	Stan Wawrinka	4	2
ESP	Rafael Nadal	5	3
CAN	Milos Raonic	6	4
JPN	Kei Nishikori	7	5
CZE	Tomáš Berdych	8	6
FRA	Jo-Wilfried Tsonga	9	7
AUT	Dominic Thiem	10	8
FRA	Gaël Monfils	11	9
ESP	David Ferrer	12	10
BEL	David Goffin	13	11
CRO	Marin Čilić	14	12
FRA	Richard Gasquet	15	13
AUS	Nick Kyrgios	16	14
ESP	Roberto Bautista Agut	17	15
ESP	Feliciano López	18	16

- Rankings are as of August 8, 2016

=== Other entrants ===
The following players received wild cards into the main singles draw:

- (United States) Jared Donaldson
- (United States) Taylor Fritz
- (United States) Reilly Opelka
- (Spain) Fernando Verdasco

The following players received entry using a protected ranking into the main draw:

- (France) Julien Benneteau
- (Argentina) Juan Mónaco

The following players received entry from the singles qualifying draw:

- (Georgia (country)) Nikoloz Basilashvili
- (Tunisia) Malek Jaziri
- (Australia) John Millman
- (Japan) Yūichi Sugita
- (Czech Republic) Jiří Veselý
- (Russia) Mikhail Youzhny
- (Germany) Mischa Zverev

The following player received entry as a lucky loser:

- (France) Adrian Mannarino

=== Withdrawals ===
Before the tournament

- (Serbia) Novak Djokovic (wrist injury) →replaced by (Italy) Andreas Seppi
- (Switzerland) Roger Federer (rehabilitation from knee injury) →replaced by (Canada) Vasek Pospisil
- (Germany) Philipp Kohlschreiber →replaced by (Spain) Pablo Carreño Busta
- (Russia) Andrey Kuznetsov →replaced by (Spain) Nicolás Almagro
- (Luxembourg) Gilles Müller →replaced by (France) Nicolas Mahut
- (United States) Jack Sock →replaced by (Croatia) Borna Ćorić
- (Serbia) Janko Tipsarević (fatigue) →replaced by (France) Adrian Mannarino

During the tournament

- (France) Gaël Monfils (back injury)

=== Retirements ===
- (Croatia) Borna Ćorić
- (Ukraine) Alexandr Dolgopolov (back injury)

== ATP doubles main-draw entrants ==
=== Seeds ===
Country	Player	Country	Player	Rank^{1}	Seed
FRA	Pierre-Hugues Herbert	FRA	Nicolas Mahut	3	1
USA	Bob Bryan	USA	Mike Bryan	11	2
GBR	Jamie Murray	BRA	Bruno Soares	12	3
CRO	Ivan Dodig	BRA	Marcelo Melo	14	4
NED	Jean-Julien Rojer	ROU	Horia Tecău	23	5
CAN	Daniel Nestor	CAN	Vasek Pospisil	26	6
IND	Rohan Bopanna	ROU	Florin Mergea	29	7
RSA	Raven Klaasen	USA	Rajeev Ram	34	8

- Rankings are as of August 8, 2016

=== Other entrants ===
The following pairs received wildcards into the doubles main draw:

- (United States) Brian Baker / (United States) Ryan Harrison
- (United States) Eric Butorac / (United States) Taylor Fritz

=== Withdrawals ===
Before the tournament

- (United States) Sam Querrey (back injury)
- (Switzerland) Stan Wawrinka (illness)

During the tournament

- (Canada) Milos Raonic (illness)

== WTA singles main-draw entrants ==
=== Seeds ===
Country	Player	Ranking	Seeds
~~USA~~	~~Serena Williams~~	~~1~~	~~1~~
GER	Angelique Kerber	2	2
ROU	Simona Halep	3	3
ESP	Garbiñe Muguruza	4	4
POL	Agnieszka Radwańska	5	5
ITA	Roberta Vinci	8	6
RUS	Svetlana Kuznetsova	10	7
SVK	Dominika Cibulková	11	8
ESP	Carla Suárez Navarro	12	9
GBR	Johanna Konta	13	10
~~CZE~~	~~Petra Kvitová~~	~~14~~	~~11~~
SUI	Timea Bacsinszky	15	12
SUI	Belinda Bencic	16	13
AUS	Samantha Stosur	17	14
CZE	Karolína Plíšková	18	15
RUS	Anastasia Pavlyuchenkova	19	16
UKR	Elina Svitolina	20	17

- Rankings are as of August 8, 2016

=== Other entrants ===
The following players received wild cards into the main singles draw:

- (United States) Louisa Chirico
- (United States) Christina McHale
- (United States) ~~Serena Williams~~ (Withdrew due to shoulder injury)

The following players received entry from the singles qualifying draw:

- (Hungary) Tímea Babos
- (Germany) Annika Beck
- (Ukraine) Kateryna Bondarenko
- (Canada) Eugenie Bouchard
- (France) Alizé Cornet
- (Russia) Varvara Flink
- (Australia) Daria Gavrilova
- (Japan) Kurumi Nara
- (United States) Alison Riske
- (Croatia) Donna Vekić
- (China) Zhang Shuai
- (China) Zheng Saisai

The following players received entry as lucky losers:

- (Japan) Misaki Doi
- (Switzerland) Viktorija Golubic
- (Sweden) Johanna Larsson
- (Bulgaria) Tsvetana Pironkova

=== Withdrawals ===
Before the tournament

- (Serbia) Jelena Janković → replaced by (Slovakia) Anna Karolína Schmiedlová
- (Czech Republic) Petra Kvitová (right leg injury) → replaced by (Switzerland) Viktorija Golubic
- (Russia) Ekaterina Makarova (change of schedule) → replaced by (Sweden) Johanna Larsson
- (Puerto Rico) Monica Puig (lower back) → replaced by (Bulgaria) Tsvetana Pironkova
- (United States) Sloane Stephens → replaced by (Ukraine) Lesia Tsurenko
- (United States) Serena Williams → replaced by (Japan) Misaki Doi

=== Retirements ===
- (France) Alizé Cornet

== WTA doubles main-draw entrants ==
=== Seeds ===
Country	Player	Country	Player	Rank^{1}	Seed
FRA	Caroline Garcia	FRA	Kristina Mladenovic	7	1
TPE	Chan Hao-ching	TPE	Chan Yung-jan	12	2
HUN	Tímea Babos	KAZ	Yaroslava Shvedova	17	3
SUI	Martina Hingis	USA	CoCo Vandeweghe	26	4
GER	Julia Görges	CZE	Karolína Plíšková	28	5
USA	Raquel Atawo	USA	Abigail Spears	34	6
IND	Sania Mirza	CZE	Barbora Strýcová	40	7
CHN	Xu Yifan	CHN	Zheng Saisai	40	8

- Rankings are as of August 8, 2016

=== Other entrants ===
The following pairs received wildcards into the doubles main draw:

- (Switzerland) Belinda Bencic / (Belgium) Kirsten Flipkens
- (United States) Lauren Davis / (United States) Varvara Lepchenko
- (Australia) Daria Gavrilova / (Russia) Daria Kasatkina

=== Withdrawals ===
During the tournament

- (Netherlands) Kiki Bertens (illness)
- (Spain) Carla Suárez Navarro (left leg injury)

== Finals ==
=== Men's singles ===
- (Croatia) Marin Čilić defeated (United Kingdom) Andy Murray, 6–4, 7–5

=== Women's singles ===
- (Czech Republic) Karolína Plíšková defeated (Germany) Angelique Kerber, 6–3, 6–1

=== Men's doubles ===
- (Croatia) Ivan Dodig / (Brazil) Marcelo Melo defeated (Netherlands) Jean-Julien Rojer / (Romania) Horia Tecău, 7–6^{(7–5)}, 6–7^{(5–7)}, [10–6]

=== Women's doubles ===
- (India) Sania Mirza / (Czech Republic) Barbora Strýcová defeated (Switzerland) Martina Hingis / (United States) CoCo Vandeweghe, 7–5, 6–4
