= 2016 ATP World Tour Finals =

- Date: 13–20 November
- Edition: 47th (singles) / 42nd (doubles)
- Category: ATP World Tour Finals
- Draw: 8S / 8D
- Prize money: $7,500,000
- Surface: Hard / indoor
- Location: London, United Kingdom
- Venue: The O_{2} Arena

Champions

Singles
- (United Kingdom) Andy Murray

Doubles
- (Finland) Henri Kontinen / (Australia) John Peers
- ATP World Tour Finals

The 2016 ATP World Tour Finals (also known as the 2016 Barclays ATP World Tour Finals for sponsorship reasons) was a men's tennis year-end tournament that was played at the O_{2} Arena in London, United Kingdom, from 13 to 20 November 2016. It was the season-ending event for the best singles players and doubles teams on the 2016 ATP World Tour.

== Finals ==
=== Singles ===
(United Kingdom) Andy Murray defeated (Serbia) Novak Djokovic, 6–3, 6–4

- It was Murray's 9th title of the year and 44th of his career. It was his 1st win at the event.

=== Doubles ===
(Finland) Henri Kontinen / (Australia) John Peers defeated (South Africa) Raven Klaasen / (United States) Rajeev Ram, 2–6, 6–1, [10–8]

== Tournament ==
The 2016 ATP World Tour Finals took place from 14 to 20 November at the O_{2} Arena in London, United Kingdom. It was the 47th edition of the tournament (42nd in doubles). The tournament was run by the Association of Tennis Professionals (ATP) and was part of the 2016 ATP World Tour. The event took place on indoor hard courts. It served as the season-ending championships for players on the ATP Tour. The eight players who qualified for the event were split into two groups of four. During this stage, players competed in a round-robin format (meaning players played against all the other players in their group). The two players with the best results in each group progressed to the semifinals, where the winners of a group faced the runners-up of the other group. This stage, however, was a knock-out stage. The doubles competition used the same format.

=== Format ===
The ATP World Tour Finals had a round-robin format, with eight players/teams divided into two groups of four. The eight seeds were determined by the ATP rankings and ATP Doubles Team Rankings on the Monday after the last ATP World Tour tournament of the calendar year. All singles matches were the best of three tie-break sets, including the final. All doubles matches were two sets (no ad) and a Match Tie-break.

== Points and prize money ==
Stage	Singles	Doubles^{1}	Points
Champion	RR + $1,675,000	RR + $245,000	RR + 900
Runner-up	RR + $545,000	RR + $83,000	RR + 400
Round robin win per match	$179,000	$34,000	200
Participation fee RR1	$102,000	$34,000	—N/a
Participation fee RR2	$32,000	$31,000	—N/a
Participation fee RR3	$45,000	pending	—N/a
Alternates	$102,000		

- RR is points or prize money won in the round robin stage.
- ^{1} Prize money for doubles is per team.
- An undefeated champion would earn the maximum 1,500 points and $2,391,000 in singles

== Qualification ==
=== Singles ===
Eight players compete at the tournament, with two named alternates. Players receive places in the following order of precedence:

1. First, the top 7 players in the ATP rankings on the Monday after the final tournament of the ATP World Tour, that is, after the 2016 Paris Masters.
2. Second, up to two 2016 Grand Slam tournament winners ranked anywhere 8th-20th, in ranking order
3. Third, the eighth ranked player in the ATP rankings

In the event of this totaling more than 8 players, those lower down in the selection order become the alternates. If further alternates are needed, these players are selected by the ATP.

Provisional rankings are published weekly as the ATP Race to the World Tour Finals, coinciding with the 52-week rolling ATP rankings on the date of selection. Points are accumulated in Grand Slam, ATP World Tour, Davis Cup, ATP Challenger Tour and ITF Futures tournaments from the 52 weeks prior to the selection date, with points from the previous years Tour Finals excluded. Players accrue points across 18 tournaments, usually made up of:

- The 4 Grand Slam tournaments
- The 8 mandatory ATP Masters tournaments
- The best results from any 6 other tournaments that carry ranking points

All players must include the ranking points for mandatory Masters tournaments for which they are on the original acceptance list and for all Grand Slams for which they would be eligible, even if they do not compete (in which case they receive zero points). Furthermore, players who finished 2014 in the world's top 30 are commitment players who must (if not injured) include points for the 8 mandatory Masters tournament regardless of whether they enter, and who must compete in at least 4 ATP 500 tournaments (though the Monte Carlo Masters may count to this total), of which one must take place after the US Open. Zero point scores may also be taken from withdrawals by non-injured players from ATP 500 tournaments according to certain other conditions outlined by the ATP. Beyond these rules, however, a player may substitute his next best tournament result for missed Masters and Grand Slam tournaments.

Players may have their ATP World Tour Masters 1000 commitment reduced by one tournament, by reaching each of the following milestones:

1. 600 tour level matches (as of January 1, 2016), including matches from Challengers and Futures played before year 2010;
2. 12 years of service;
3. 31 years of age (as of January 1, 2016).

Players must be defined by the ATP as in good standing to avail of the reduced commitment.

=== Doubles ===
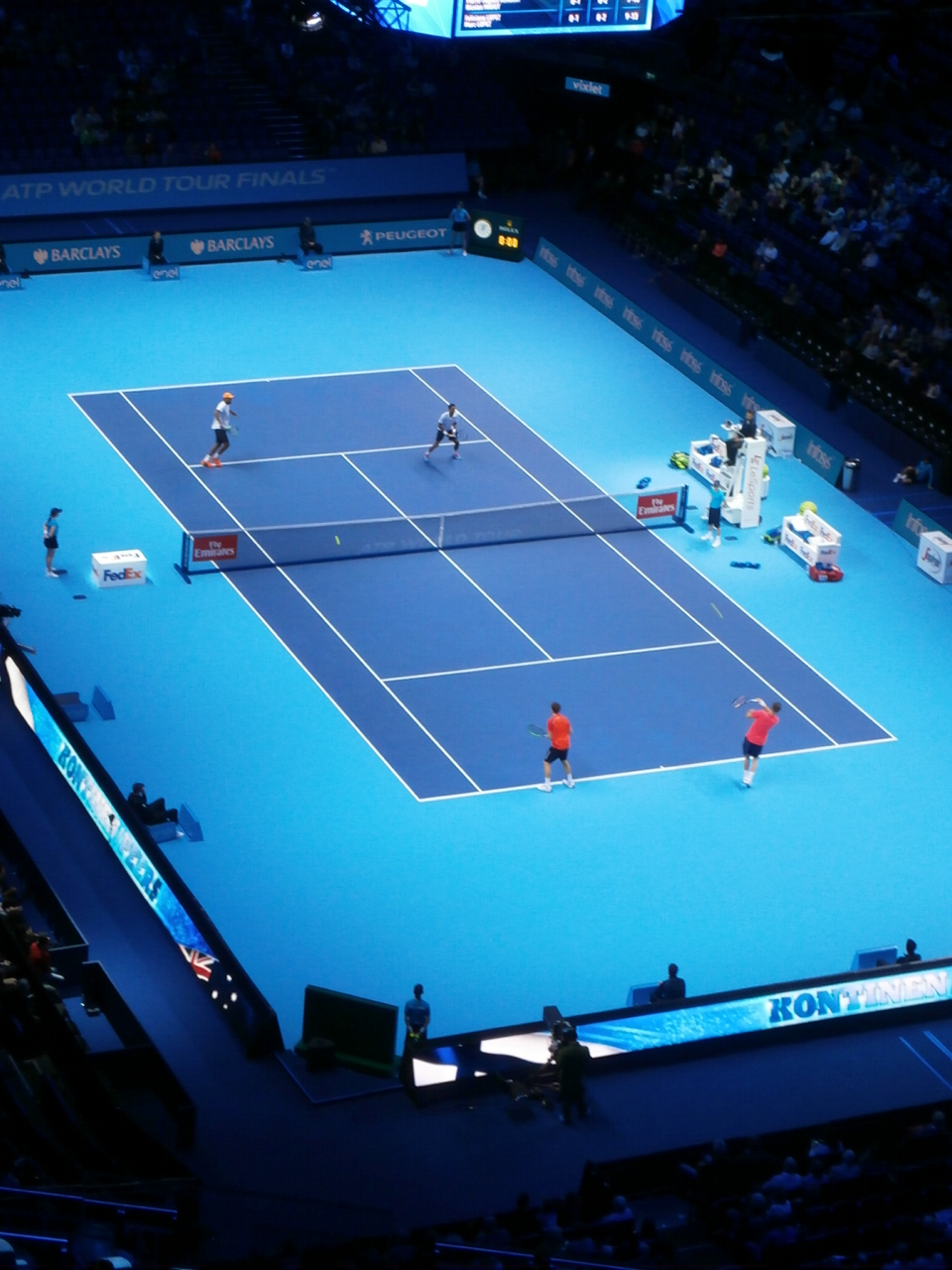
Henri Kontinen and John Peers defeated Raven Klaasen and Rajeev Ram 6–3, 6–4 at the round robin stage.

Eight teams compete at the tournament, with one named alternates. The eight competing teams receive places according to the same order of precedence as in Singles. The named alternate will be offered first to any unaccepted teams in the selection order, then to the highest ranked unaccepted team, and then to a team selected by the ATP. Points are accumulated in the same competitions as for the Singles tournament. However, for Doubles teams there are no commitment tournaments, so teams are ranked according to their 18 highest points scoring results from any tournaments.

== Qualified players ==
=== Singles ===
#	Players	Points	Tours	Date Qualified
1	Andy Murray (GBR)	11,185	16	8 July
2	Novak Djokovic (SRB)	10,780	14	2 June
3	Stan Wawrinka (SUI)	5,115	19	12 September
4	Milos Raonic (CAN)	5,050	18	9 October
5	Kei Nishikori (JPN)	4,705	19	12 October
6	Gaël Monfils (FRA)	3,625	16	27 October
7	Marin Čilić (CRO)	3,450	17	3 November
–	Rafael Nadal (ESP)	3,300	15	20 October
8	Dominic Thiem (AUT)	3,215	18	4 November

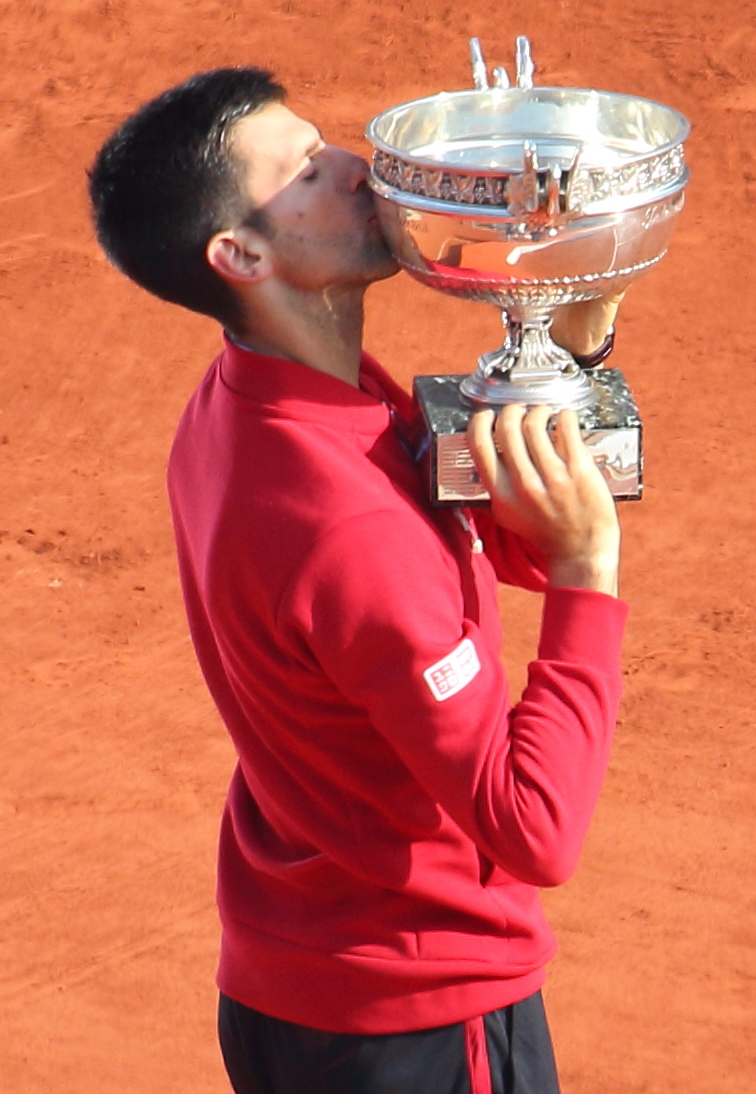
Djokovic winning the 2016 French Open and completing the career slam

On June 6, Novak Djokovic became the first qualifier to the event.

Novak Djokovic collected his 60th career title at the Qatar ExxonMobil Open, defeating Nadal in two sets in a final that lasted 73 minutes. Djokovic then proceeded to win his sixth Australian Open. On his road to his Open Era record sixth title in Melbourne, he defeated Roger Federer in four sets in the semi-finals, and in a rematch of the 2015 final, he defeated Andy Murray, in three straight sets. At the Dubai Tennis Championships, he retired against Feliciano López in the quarterfinals due to an eye infection. He quickly rebounded by winning back-to-back title, collecting his fifth Indian Wells Masters title, defeating Milos Raonic in the final and the Miami Open for the third consecutive year defeating Kei Nishikori. His finals win in Miami saw Djokovic surpass Roger Federer to become the all-time leading prize money winner on the ATP tour with career earnings of $98.2 million. After an early round exit to Jiří Veselý at the Monte Carlo Masters, Djokovic quickly bounced back by winning the Madrid Open for the second time in his career with a three set victory over Murray. They met again at the following event at the Rome Masters final one week later with Murray the victor, despite a sluggish performance. Djokovic defeated Andy Murray in the final of the French Open in four sets, making him the reigning champion of all four major tournaments, a historic feat the media dubbed the "Nole Slam." With his French Open triumph, Djokovic became the 8th player in history (and the second oldest) to achieve a Career Grand Slam. However, at Wimbledon, his major win streak came to an end in the third-round when he lost to American Sam Querrey in four sets. It was his earliest exit in a Grand Slam since the 2009 French Open.

Djokovic returned to form by winning his fourth Rogers Cup title over Nishikori, and 30th Masters 1000 title overall, without dropping a set. However, at the Summer Olympics, Djokovic was beaten in the first round by Juan Martín del Potro. It was Djokovic's first opening round defeat since January 2009. In the final slam of the year, the US Open, Djokovic advanced to the final but was defeated by Stan Wawrinka in four sets, after an odd path to the final receiving two retirements and a walkover. Djokovic was defeated by Roberto Bautista Agut and Marin Čilić in the semi-finals and quarterfinals of the Shanghai Rolex Masters and BNP Paribas Masters. This marks Djokovic's 10th appearance at the event.

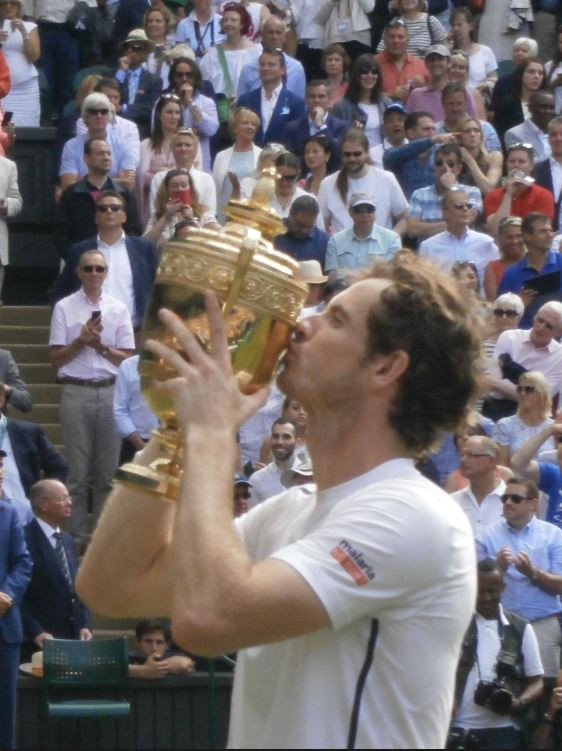
In 2016, Murray won his second Wimbledon title.

On July 8, after reaching the Wimbledon final, Andy Murray qualified for the event.

Andy Murray began his 2016 season by playing in the Hopman Cup, pairing up with Heather Watson again. However, they finished second in their group. Murray played his first competitive tournament of 2016 at the Australian Open where he was aiming to win his first title there after four runner-up finishes. He went on to reach his fifth Australian Open final but lost in the final to an in-form Novak Djokovic in straight sets. He became the second man in the Open Era (after Ivan Lendl) to lose five Grand Slam finals at one event, and the only one not to have won the title. Murray then played at the Davis Cup defeating Taro Daniel in straight sets and Kei Nishikori in five sets. Murray then competed at the Indian Wells Masters and Miami Open but suffered upsets in the third round of each event to Federico Delbonis and Grigor Dimitrov, respectively. Murray began his clay court season at the Monte-Carlo Rolex Masters losing to eventual champion Rafael Nadal in the semifinals despite winning the first set. Murray then played at the Mutua Madrid Open as the 2nd seed and the defending champion, but once again lost to number 1 seed Djokovic in three sets in the final. He claimed his first title of the season at the Rome Masters, earning his first win over Djokovic on clay, when he defeated the Serbian in the final. Murray then moved on to the French Open, where he became the first male British player since Bunny Austin in 1937, to reach a French Open final. He was unable to win his maiden French Open final, losing to Djokovic in four sets.

Murray started his grass season at the Queen's Club Championships, where he claimed his fifth title at the event defeating Milos Raonic in the final. At the Wimbledon Championships, in a rematch of their Queen's Club final, he won his second Wimbledon title over Raonic. Murray next played at the Rio Olympic Games. He became the first player, male or female, to wim two gold medals in the tennis singles events by defeating Juan Martín del Potro in the final, which lasted over four hours. At the Western & Southern Open, Murray was able to reach the final, however his 22 match winning streak was snapped when fell to Marin Čilić in the final. At the US Open, he lost to sixth seed Kei Nishikori in five sets despite holding a two sets to one lead. Murray then won the China Open for his fifth title of 2016 and 40th career tour title. He defeated Grigor Dimitrov in the finals. Murray then backed this up with a tournament win at the Shanghai Rolex Masters over surprise finalist Roberto Bautista Agut all in straight sets to capture his 13th masters title and 3rd title in Shanghai. Murray brought his win streak to 15 consecutive match wins by winning the Erste Bank Open for his seventh tour title of the season, where he defeated Jo-Wilfried Tsonga in the final. At the BNP Paribas Masters, after reaching the final, Murray became the first British man to reach No. 1 since the introduction of the rankings in 1973. Murray then defeated John Isner in the final in 3 sets to win his fourth consecutive tournament and first Paris Masters title.

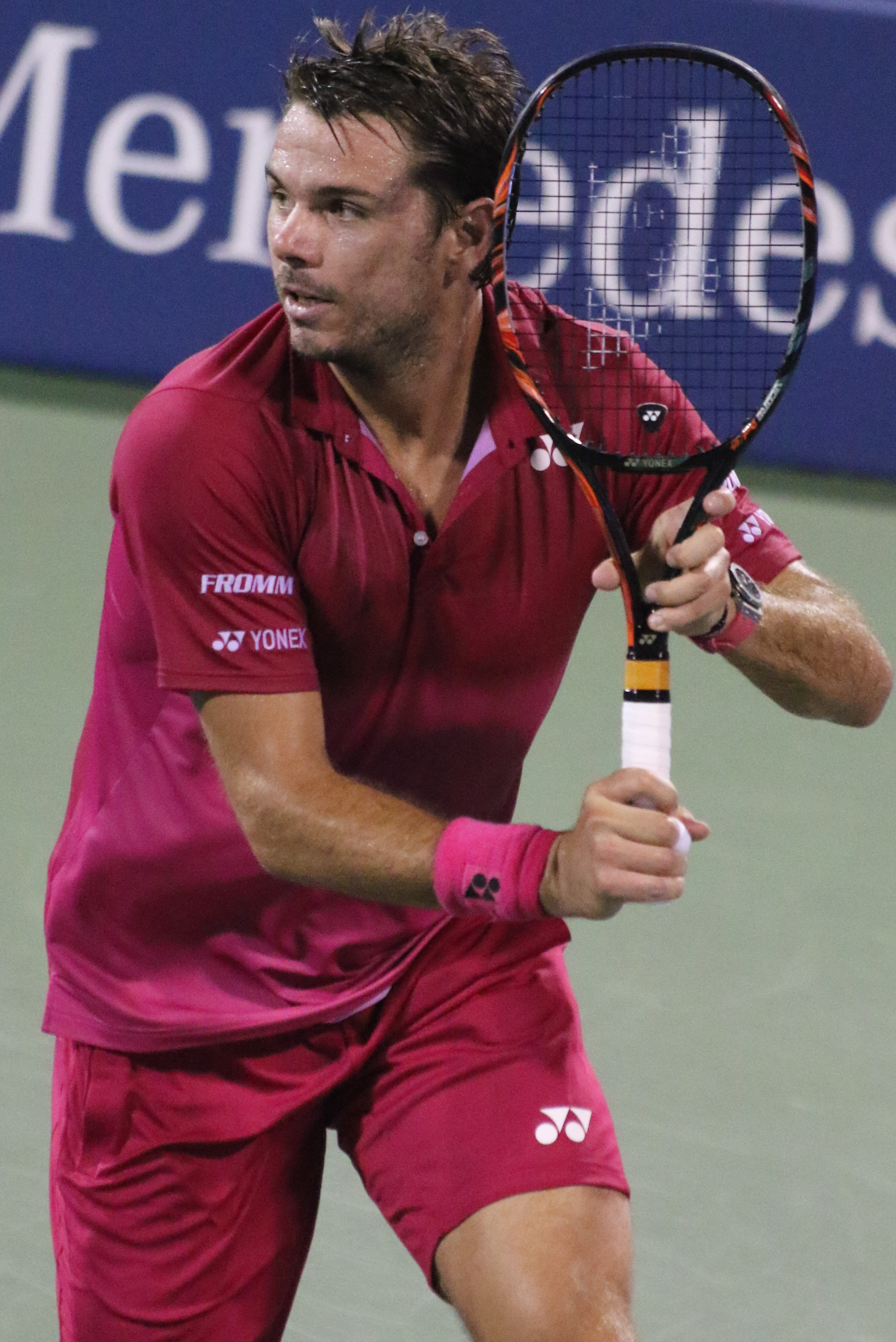
Wawrinka won his third slam at the US Open

On September 12, following his US Open triumph, Stan Wawrinka qualified for the event.

Stan Wawrinka started his season at the Chennai Open where he was the two-time defending champion successfully defended his title over Borna Ćorić. He then played in the Australian Open, in the fourth round he played big serving Canadian and 13th seed Milos Raonic, despite pushing it to a fifth set he was unable to overcome the Canadian and lost. Wawrinka then played in the Open 13, he was received an upset loss in the quarterfinals to Benoît Paire. Wawrinka then played in the Dubai Tennis Championships and won the title over surprise finalist Marcos Baghdatis in straight sets. He then suffered early loses at the Indian Wells Masters to David Goffin in the fourth round and the Miami Open to Andrey Kuznetsov in the second round. Next up was the Monte-Carlo Masters losing in the quarterfinals to the eventual champion Rafael Nadal. Wawrinka then suffered another first round exit at the Mutua Madrid Open to Nick Kyrgios. He then competed at the Rome Masters but suffered an early loss again in the third round Juan Mónaco. He bounced back at the Geneva Open defeating Marin Čilić in the final for his 3rd title of the year. At the French Open, as the 3rd seed and the defending champion, he was able to reach the semifinals playing 2nd seed Andy Murray. He lost in four sets. He then played at Queens Club Championships, but suffered a straight sets defeat to Fernando Verdasco in the first round. His next tournament was at the Wimbledon Championships, he lost in the second round by Juan Martín del Potro in four sets. He was able to reach the semifinals of the Rogers Cup falling to Kei Nishikori but was upset in the third round of the Western & Southern Open losing to Grigor Dimitrov in two sets.

At the final slam of the year, the U.S. Open, Wawrinka was able to reach the finals and went on to defeat Novak Djokovic in four sets, earning his third major title in as many years and his eleventh consecutive win in a championship final. This keeps Wawrinka undefeated in slam finals. He then entered St Petersburg Open, and reached the final, losing to rising teenager Alexander Zverev Jr. in 3 sets. Wawrinka did not achieve more notable results for the rest of the season, losing to Gilles Simon in the third round of Shanghai Rolex Masters, Mischa Zverev in the quarterfinals of Swiss Indoors, and Jan-Lennard Struff in the second round of BNP Paribas Masters after holding matchpoint.

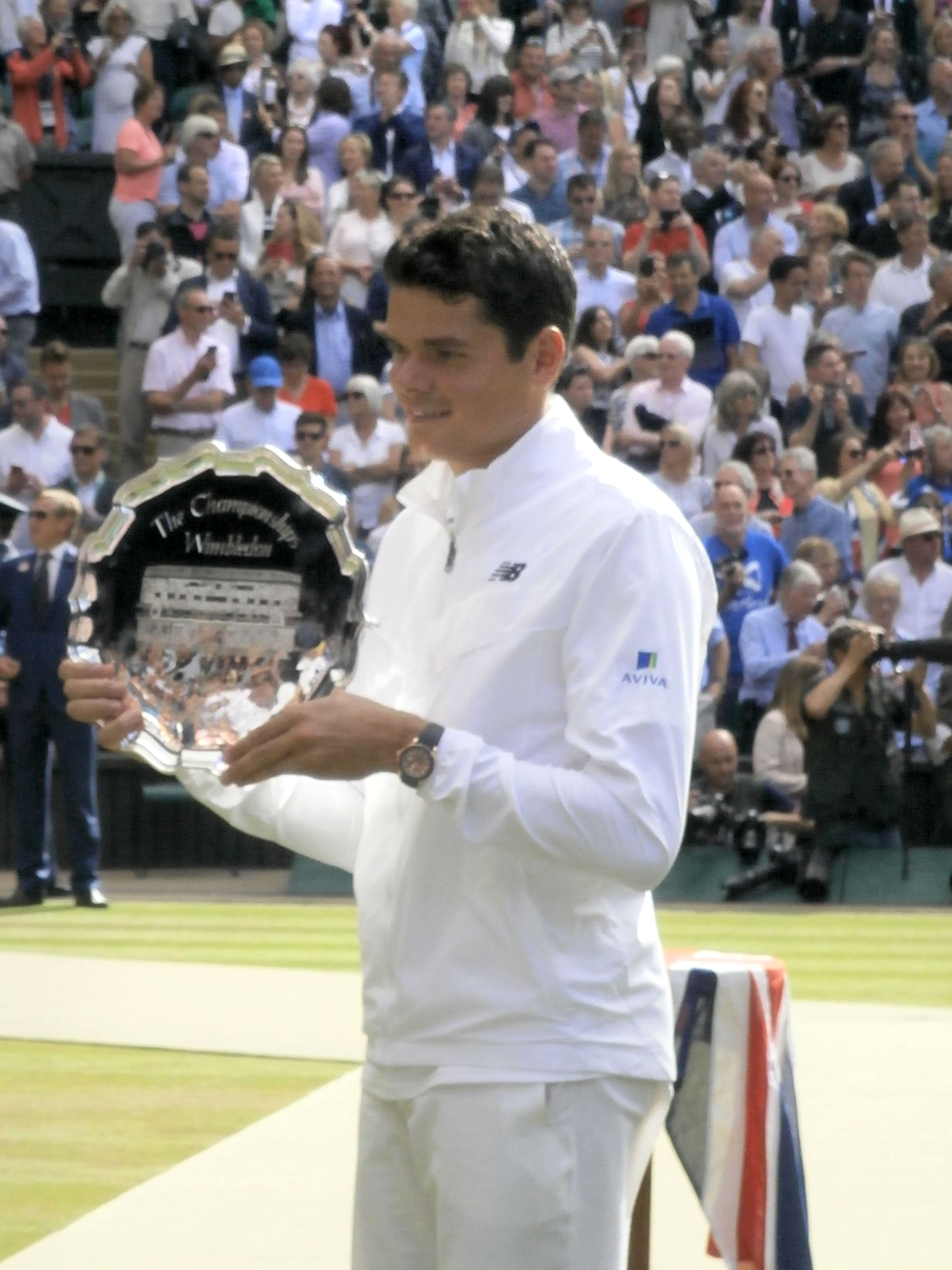
Milos Raonic was a finalist at Wimbledon in 2016. This was his first appearance in a Grand Slam final.

On October 9, after reaching the semifinals of the China Open, Milos Raonic qualified for the second time.

Milos Raonic began the year, by reaching the final of the Brisbane International against No. 3 Federer in a rematch of their 2015 final. This time, Raonic upset Federer in straight sets, winning his eighth career title. At the Australian Open, he reached the semifinals for the first time and became the first Canadian man to reach the semifinals in the event. However, he lost to No. 2 Murray in five sets, sustaining an adductor injury while leading two sets to one. The adductor injury kept Raonic out of competition for six weeks. He returned to action at the Indian Wells Masters, reaching the final against No. 1 Novak Djokovic where he lost in straight sets, his third consecutive loss in a Masters final. Raonic followed Indian Wells by reaching the quarterfinals at the next three Masters events in Miami Open, Monte-Carlo Rolex Masters and Mutua Madrid Open, eventually losing to Nick Kyrgios, Murray, and Djokovic, respectively. Raonic continued the clay court season with a second-round loss at the Italian Open to Kyrgios. At the French Open, he received an upset in the fourth round in straight sets to No. 55 Albert Ramos Viñolas.

Raonic began the grass court season by advancing to his first grass court final at the Queen's Club Championships without dropping serve, but lost the final in three sets to Murray. At the Wimbledon Championships, Raonic reached his second straight final and once again faced Murray. In the final, he lost to Murray in straight sets. With the transition to hard courts after Wimbledon, Raonic made the quarterfinals of the Rogers Cup losing to Monfils and the semifinals of the Western & Southern Open falling to Murray for the fifth time in 2016. Raonic was the fifth seed at the US Open, but lost in the second round to Ryan Harrison. Raonic then failed to defend his title at the St. Petersburg Open, falling in his opening match to Mikhail Youzhny. Raonic withdrew from the China Open prior to his semifinal match against Grigor Dimitrov due to an ankle injury sustained in the quarterfinal. He then lost back-to-back matches in the third round of Shanghai Rolex Masters to Jack Sock and the first round of Swiss Indoors to Ričardas Berankis. Raonic suffered another injury, a quadriceps tear, during his quarterfinal match against Jo-Wilfried Tsonga at the BNP Paribas Masters and withdrew before his scheduled semifinal against Murray.

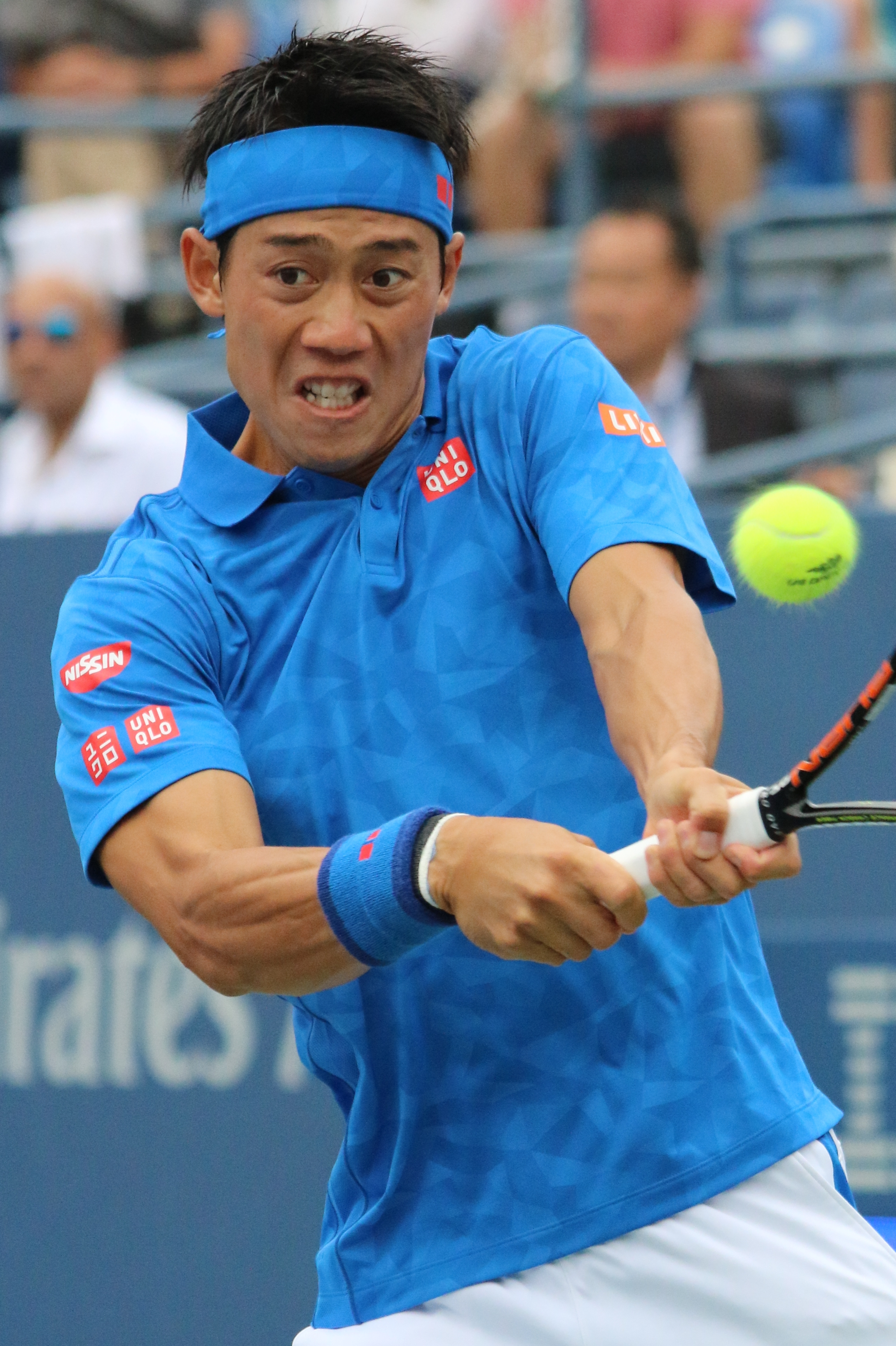
Nishikori reached two Masters final.

On October 12, Kei Nishikori claimed the fifth spot in the event.

Kei Nishikori began the season at the Brisbane International, where he advanced to the quarterfinals, but was upset Bernard Tomic in three sets. At the Australian Open, Nishikori reach his third Australian Open quarterfinal, where he lost to Novak Djokovic. Nishikori next competed at the Memphis Open where he was the three-time defending champion and beat young American Taylor Fritz in straight sets to win his fourth straight Memphis title and his 11th ATP title overall. He followed it up with a second round loss to Sam Querrey at the Abierto Mexicano Telcel. During the March Masters, Nishikori reached the quarterfinals in the Indian Wells Masters for the first time in his career losing to Rafael Nadal in straight sets. Nishikori improved his feat by reaching his second final in a Masters event, but lost to then world No. 1 Djokovic in straight sets. Nishikori came into Barcelona Open Banc Sabadell as the defending champion, but lost in straight sets to resurgent nine-time champion Nadal in the final. He followed his good run by reaching back-to-back semifinals in the Mutua Madrid Open and Italian Open losing to Djokovic on both occasions. He later participated at the French Open but unfortunately lost to Richard Gasquet in the fourth round in 4 sets. Nishikori began his grass season at the Halle Open, but retired in the 2nd round due to a hip injury. His next tournament was at Wimbledon, where he retired in the fourth round against Marin Čilić, once again due to injury.

Nishikori started his US Open Series campaign, at the Rogers Cup, where he reached the final, but for the fifth time in the year lost to Djokovic in straight sets. Nishikori then represented Japan at the Rio Olympics, where he reached the semis before being defeated by World No. 2 Andy Murray in straight sets. However, he later acquired the bronze medal after he defeated Nadal, becoming the first Japanese man to win a tennis medal in 96 years. At the Western & Southern Open, he again lost to Tomic in the third round. Nishikori nearly replicated his 2014 US Open run by reaching the semifinals of the US Open, but lost after leading by a set and a break against eventual champion Stan Wawrinka in the semifinals in 4 sets. After retiring in his home tournament, the Rakuten Japan Open, in the second round to João Sousa, Nishikori returned to action again in the Swiss Indoors where he lost to Marin Čilić in the finals. In the final Masters event of the year, Nishikori fell to Jo-Wilfried Tsonga in the third round despite winning the first set with a bagel.

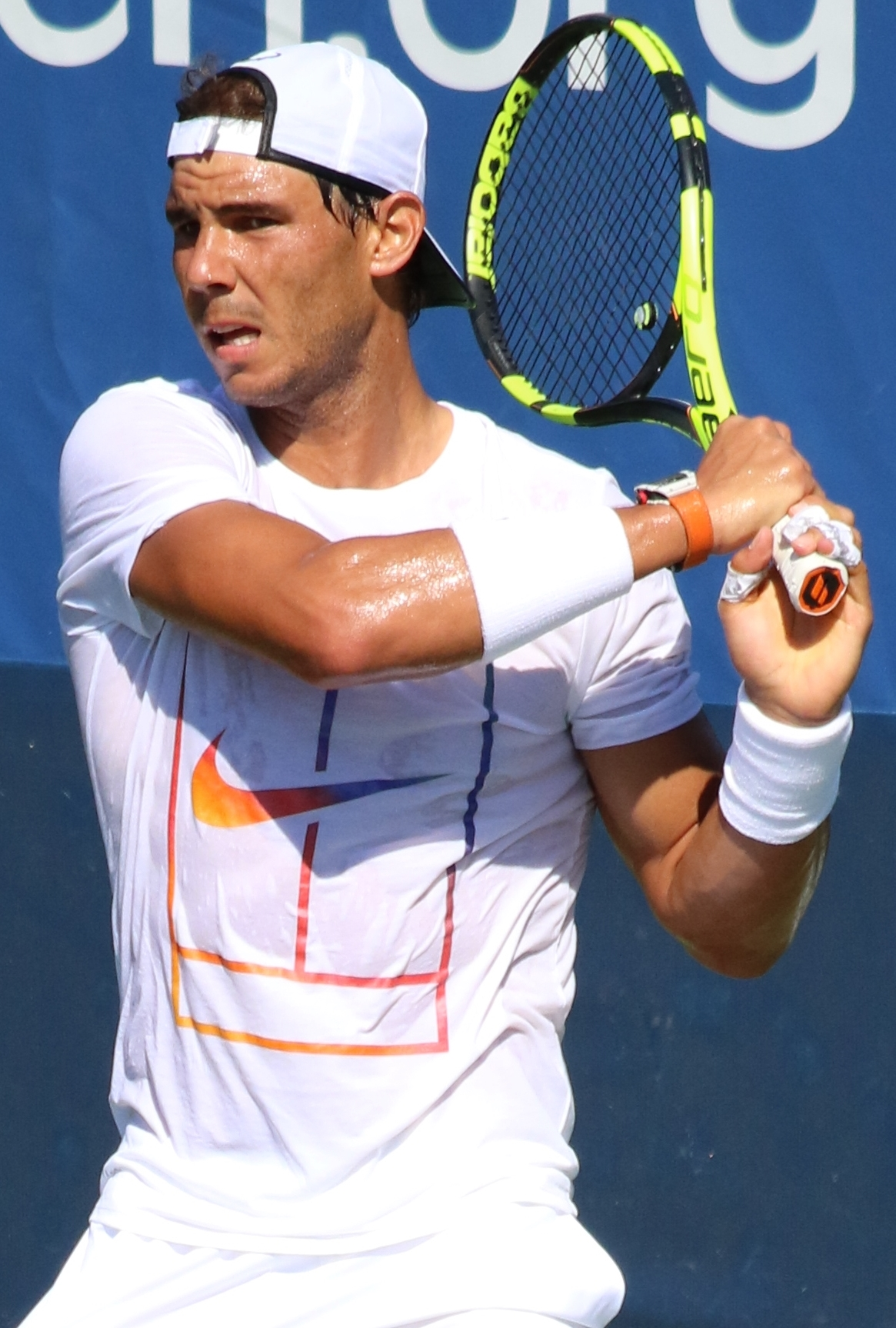
Nadal at the 2016 US Open

On October 20, Nadal announced his was ending his 2016 season despite having enough points to qualify for the event.

Rafael Nadal started the year by reaching the final of the Qatar ExxonMobil Open losing to Novak Djokovic in straight sets. At the Australian Open, Nadal was defeated in five sets by compatriot Fernando Verdasco in the first round. The defeat marked his first opening round exit at the Australian Open. He then competed in the South American clay courts of the Argentina Open and Rio Open losing to eventual champions Dominic Thiem and Pablo Cuevas, respectively. He reached his third consecutive semifinal at the Indian Wells Masters falling to Djokovic. At the Miami Open, he suffered an upset in his opening match losing to Damir Džumhur. He started his European clay court season perfectly winning back-to-back titles at the Monte Carlo Rolex Masters and Barcelona Open Banc Sabadell defeating Gaël Monfils and Kei Nishikori, respectively. He continued the clay court season in Mutua Madrid Open, falling to Andy Murray in the semifinal. The following week, Nadal played in Rome Masters where he reached the quarterfinal. Nadal was again defeated by Djokovic in straight sets, although he had a break advantage in both sets and served to win the second. As the fourth seed at Roland Garros, Nadal had to withdraw prior to his third round match due to a left wrist injury. He did not return into action until the Rio Olympics, where he lost his Bronze Medal match against Nishikori but won the gold medal in men's doubles event for Spain partnering Marc López defeating Romania's Florin Mergea and Horia Tecău in the finals. At the Western & Southern Open, he fell to Borna Ćorić on the third round. At the US Open Nadal was seeded #4 and advanced to the fourth round but was defeated by 24th seed Lucas Pouille in 5 sets. The defeat meant that 2016 was the first year since 2004 in which Nadal had failed to reach a Grand Slam quarter-final in a year. He played his last match of the season in the second round of the Shanghai Rolex Masters losing to Viktor Troicki.

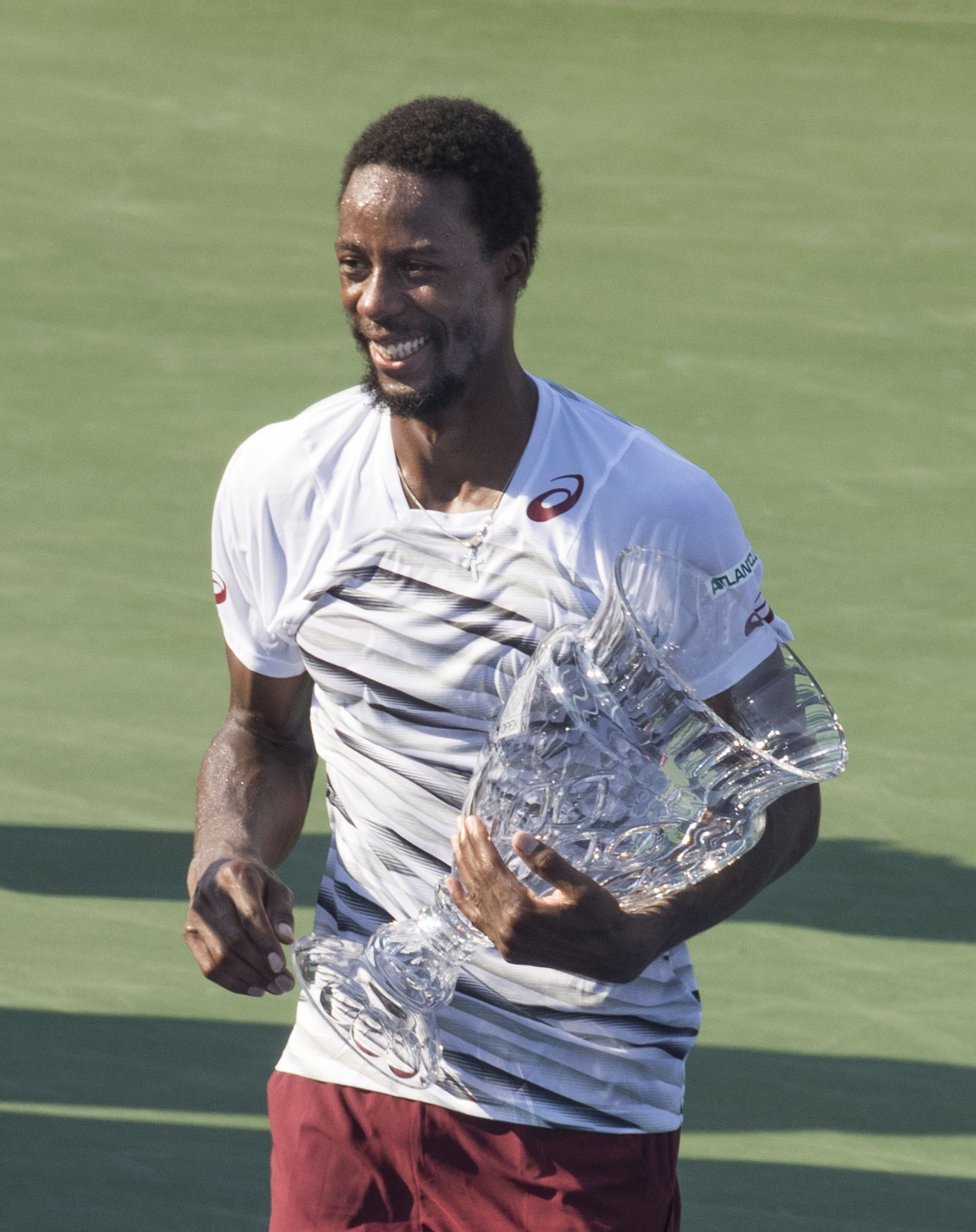
Monfils qualified for the first time

On October 27, Gaël Monfils qualified for the first time to the year-end event.

Gaël Monfils started his season at the Australian Open as the 23rd seeded, he reached the singles quarterfinals of the Australian Open for the first time. There, he lost to the 13th seed Milos Raonic in four sets. However, he wasn't able to sustain this form, losing in the first round of his home event the Open Sud de France to Édouard Roger-Vasselin. He reached his first final of the year at the Rotterdam Open, where he lost to Martin Kližan in three sets. Monfils reached the quarterfinals of back-to-back Masters event, the Indian Wells Masters and Miami Open, losing to eventual runner-ups Raonic and Kei Nishikori, respectively. Monfils then reached a third career Masters event final at the Monte Carlo Rolex Masters losing to the eight-time champion Rafael Nadal in three sets. After catching a viral infection in Madrid, Monfils fell early at the Mutua Madrid Open – Men's singles and Rome Masters, in the second round to Pablo Cuevas and in the first round to Thomaz Bellucci. He then withdrew from the French Open due to the infection. His next event was at Wimbledon where he lost his first-round match with compatriot Jérémy Chardy in five sets. Monfils earned his first ever 500 event singles title by defeating Croatian Ivo Karlović in the final in three sets on the hard courts of the Citi Open.

Monfils then reached the semifinals of the Rogers Cup facing Novak Djokovic, to whom he lost to in straight sets, ending his career-best win streak of 9 consecutive matches. At the Rio Olympics, he reached the quarterfinals and lost to eventual bronze medalist Kei Nishikori, despite having 3 match point chances in the deciding set. He then withdrew from this third round match at the Western & Southern Open. Monfils entered the US Open seeded 10th and reached the semifinals without dropping a set, eventually losing to Djokovic in four sets. Monfils then entered the Japan Open, reaching the semifinals and losing to eventual champion Nick Kyrgios. At the Shanghai Rolex Masters, he lost to David Goffin, and despite winning being a set and a break up. At the Stockholm Open, he was upset by Gastão Elias in his opening match.

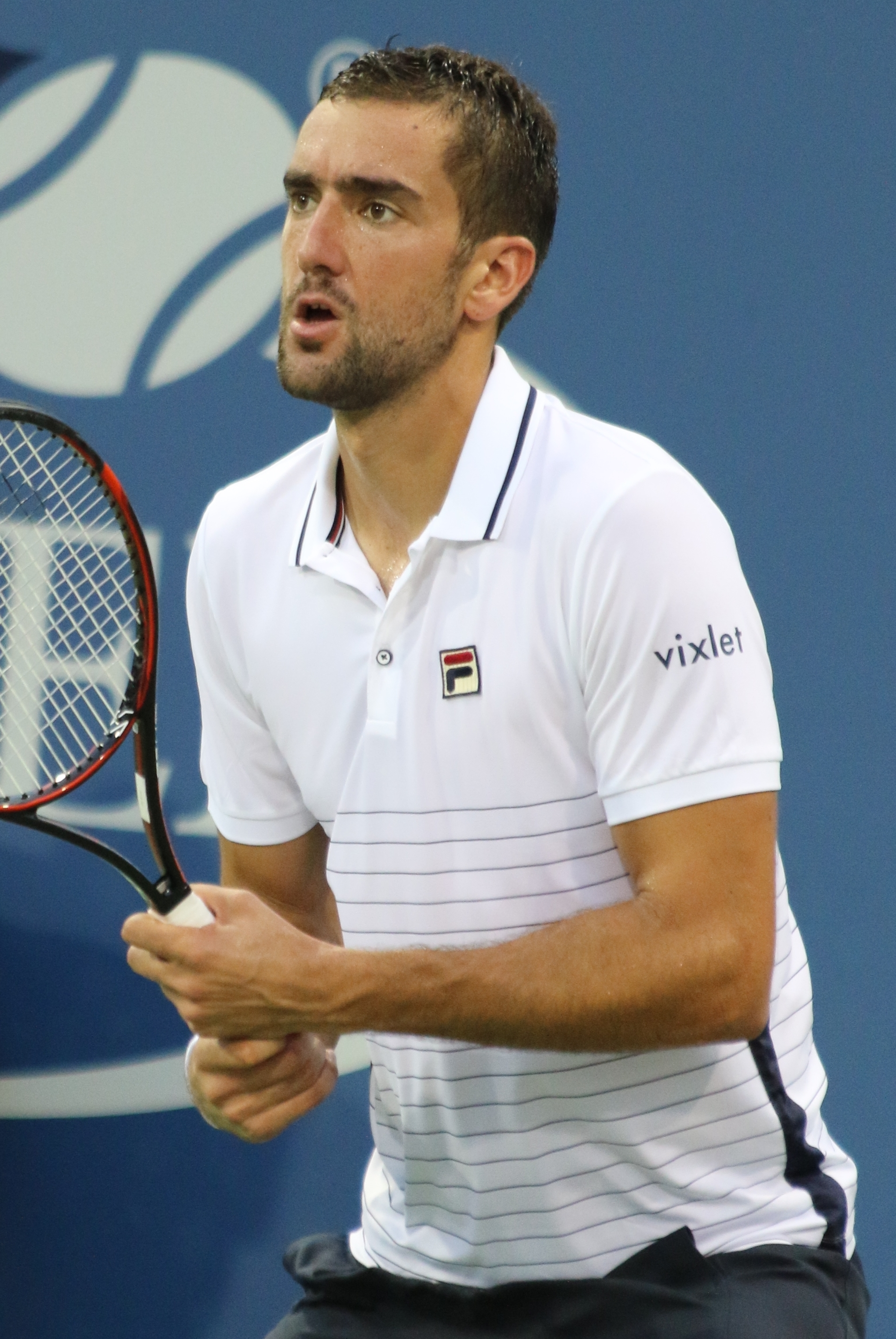
Čilić won his first Masters title in Cincinnati

On November 3, Marin Čilić occupied the seventh slot.

Marin Čilić began his season with a quarterfinal showing at the Brisbane International losing to Dominic Thiem. He was then upset by Roberto Bautista Agut in the third round of the Australian Open. His struggle continues losing in the first round of Open Sud de France to Alexander Zverev and the quarterfinal of the Rotterdam Open to Philipp Kohlschreiber. He reached his first final of the year at the Open 13 but lost to Nick Kyrgios. Čilić next events were average losing in the first round of Abierto Mexicano Telcel to Ryan Harrison, quarterfinals of the Indian Wells Masters to David Goffin and third round of the Miami Masters to Gilles Simon. He didn't play any event until the Geneva Open due to a knee injury where he reached the final losing to Stan Wawrinka. At the French Open, he suffered a shocking upset to qualifier Marco Trungelliti in the first round. He began his grass court season with a loss to Radek Štěpánek at the MercedesCup but bounced back with a semifinal showing at the Queen's Club Championships losing to Andy Murray. At the Wimbledon Championships, he reached the quarterfinals falling to Roger Federer.

He then suffered an opening round loss at the Rogers Cup this time to compatriot Ivo Karlović. Representing Croatia at the Rio Olympics, Čilić reached the third round losing to Gaël Monfils. However, he bounced back by winning his first title of the year and his first Master event title of his career, when he won the Western & Southern Open defeating Murray in the final. With his first Masters title in the bag, he again received an upset loss in the third round of the US Open to Jack Sock in straight sets. At the Asian swing, he reached the semifinals of the Japan Open losing again to Goffin. He then fell in his opening round match at the Shanghai Rolex Master to Zverev. At the Swiss Indoors, Čilić claimed his second title of the year, when he defeated Nishikori in the final. At the BNP Paribas Masters, Čilić defeated Novak Djokovic for the first time in his career to reach the semi-finals, where he subsequently lost to John Isner

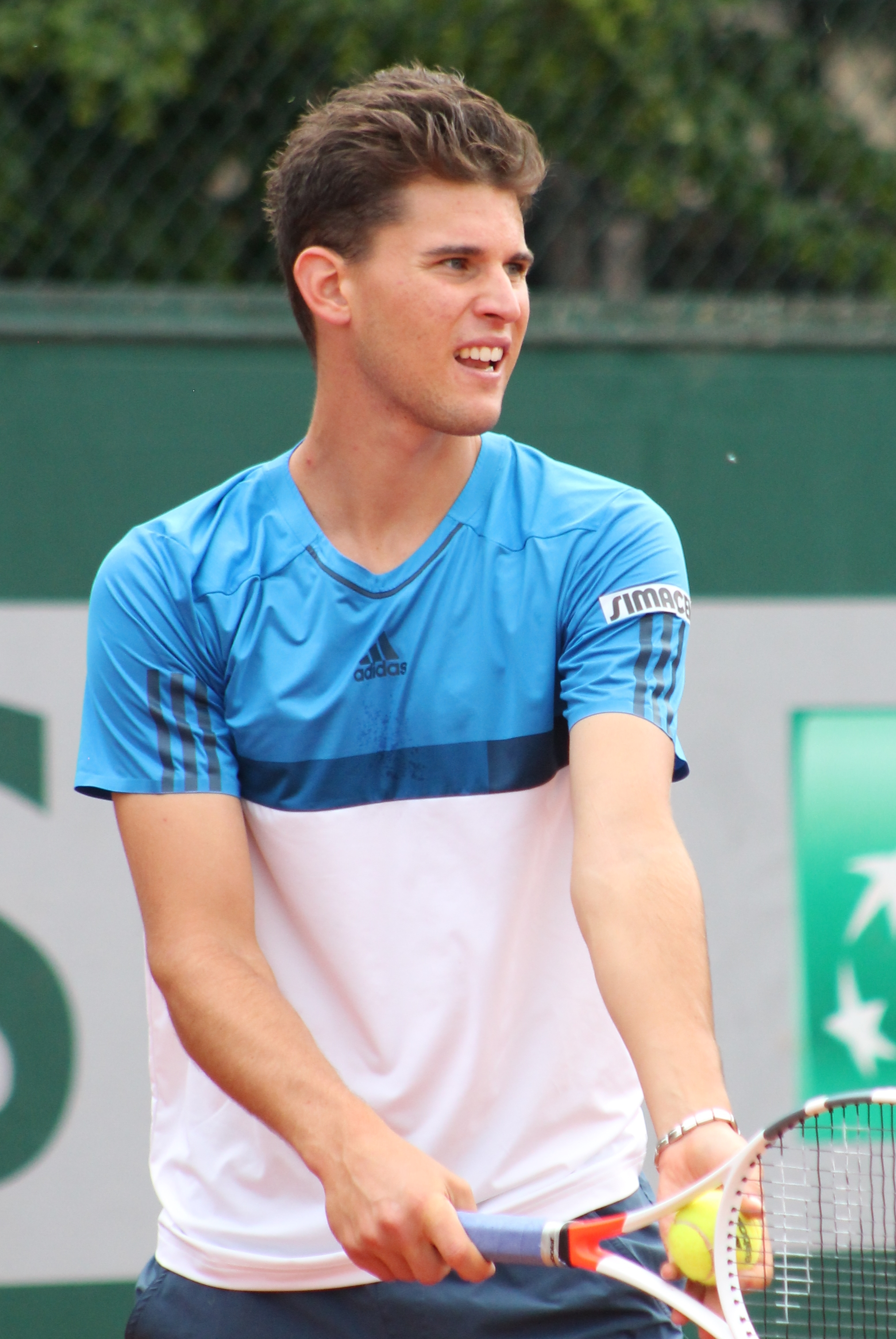
Dominic Thiem reached his first slam semifinal

On November 4, Dominic Thiem qualified for the first time to the year-end finals.

Dominic Thiem started the year with a semifinal run at the Brisbane International but losing to Roger Federer in straight sets. He then received a bye into the second round of the Sydney International, where he retired against Gilles Müller due to a recurring right foot blister. Thiem reached the third round of the Australian Open, his best run yet, but lost to world number 16 David Goffin in four sets. Thiem next competed at the Argentina Open, where he upset defending champion Rafael Nadal in three sets after saving match point in the semifinals. Thiem went on to win his fourth ATP title by defeating Nicolás Almagro in three sets. He next competed at the Rio Open, reaching the semifinals where he was defeated by Guido Pella. Thiem then won his first hard court title and ATP 500 title at the Mexican Open defeating Bernard Tomic in the final. In the first Masters events of the year, Thiem had back-to-back third round defeats against Jo-Wilfried Tsonga at the Indian Wells Masters, to Novak Djokovic at the Miami Open and to Nadal at the Monte-Carlo Rolex Masters. At the BMW Open he reached the final but lost to German Philipp Kohlschreiber. At the Mutua Madrid Masters, he lost Argentine Juan Martín del Potro in the first round. He then competed in the Italian Open, where in the quarterfinals, Thiem lost to sixth seed Kei Nishikori in straight sets. at the Open de Nice Côte d'Azur, Thiem successfully defended his title, beating Alexander Zverev, having not lost a set until the final. At the French Open, Thiem reached the semi-finals of a major for the first time in his career, where he lost to No. 1 and eventual champion Novak Djokovic. By reaching this semifinal he also made his debut inside the top 10 of ATP rankings as world No. 7.

Thiem started his grass season at the MercedesCup, he defeated Philipp Kohlschreiber to win his first ever grass court tournament. His next event was at the Gerry Weber Open where he lost to eventual champion Florian Mayer in the semifinals. Thiem didn't have much luck at the Wimbledon Championships, as in the second round he was defeated by Jiří Veselý. He then suffered back-to-back opening round loses to Jürgen Melzer at the Generali Open Kitzbühel and at the Rogers Cup retiring against Kevin Anderson. He bounced back by reaching the quarterfinals of the Western & Southern Open losing to Milos Raonic. At the U.S. Open, Thiem reached the fourth round, where he retired against Juan Martín del Potro because his right knee was bothering him. Thiem then reached the final at the Moselle Open but lost against Lucas Pouille. In the Asian swing, he was suffered back-to-back loses to Albert Ramos Viñolas in the second round of the Chengdu Open and was upset by Alexander Zverev in the first round of the China Open in 3 sets. In the indoor events of Erste Bank Open and BNP Paribas Masters, he suffered early loses in the second round to Viktor Troicki and in the first round to Jack Sock, respectively.

== Points breakdown ==
=== Singles ===
The following players qualified for the 2016 World Tour Finals.

- Players in gold were the qualifiers.
- Players in dark gold withdrew before the tournament.
- Players in white served as alternate.
- Players in brown declined the alternate spot.

Rank	Player	Grand Slam				ATP World Tour Masters 1000 (Note: 2016 Monte-Carlo Rolex Masters is not a mandatory tournament, and is counted in the Best Other column instead.)								Best Other						Total points	Tourn
Rank	Player	AUS	FRA	WIM	USO	IW	MIA	MAD	ITA	CAN	CIN	SHA	PAR	1	2	3	4	5	6	Total points	Tourn
1	(United Kingdom) Andy Murray	F 1200	F 1200	W 2000	QF; 360	R32; 45	R32; 45	F 600	W 1000	A 0	F 600	W 1000	W 1000	W 500	W 500	W 500	SF; 360	DC; 275		11,185	16
2	(Serbia) Novak Djokovic	W 2000	W 2000	R32; 90	F 1200	W 1000	W 1000	W 1000	F 600	W 1000	A 0	SF; 360	QF; 180	W 250	QF; 90	R32; 10				10,780	14
3	(Switzerland) Stan Wawrinka	R16; 180	SF; 720	R64; 45	W 2000	R16; 90	R64; 10	R32; 10	R16; 90	SF; 360	R16; 90	R16; 90	R32; 10	W 500	W 250	W 250	QF; 180	F 150	QF; 90	5,115	19
4	(Canada) Milos Raonic	SF; 720	R16; 180	F 1200	R64; 45	F 600	QF; 180	QF; 180	R32; 45	QF; 180	SF; 360	R16; 90	SF; 360	F 300	W 250	QF; 180	SF; 180	R16; 0	R32; 0	5,050	18
5	(Japan) Kei Nishikori	QF; 360	R16; 180	R16; 180	SF; 720	QF; 180	F 600	SF; 360	SF; 360	F 600	R16; 90	A 0	R16; 90	F 300	F 300	W 250	R16; 45	R16; 45	QF; 45	4,705	19
6	(France) Gaël Monfils	QF; 360	A 0	R128; 10	SF; 720	QF; 180	QF; 180	R32; 45	R64; 10	SF; 360	R16; 90	R16; 90	A 0	F 600	W 500	F 300	SF; 180	R32; 0	R16; 0	3,625	16
7	(Croatia) Marin Čilić	R32; 90	R128; 10	QF; 360	R32; 90	QF; 180	R32; 45	A 0	A 0	R32; 10	W 1000	R32; 10	SF; 360	W 500	SF; 180	SF; 180	F 150	F 150	QF; 90	3,450	17
8	(Spain) Rafael Nadal	R128; 10	R32; 90	A 0	R16; 180	SF; 360	R64; 10	SF; 360	QF; 180	A 0	R16; 90	R32; 10	A 0	W 1000	W 500	SF; 180	F 150	QF; 90	SF; 90	3,300	15
9	(Austria) Dominic Thiem	R32; 90	SF; 720	R64; 45	R16; 180	R16; 90	R16; 90	R64; 10	QF; 180	R32; 10	QF; 180	A 0	R32; 10	W 500	W 250	W 250	W 250	SF; 180	SF; 180	3,215	18
Alternates
10	(Czech Republic) Tomáš Berdych	QF; 360	QF; 360	SF; 720	A 0	R16; 90	QF; 180	QF; 180	R16; 90	QF; 180	R16; 90	R32; 10	QF; 180	W 250	SF; 90	SF; 90	SF; 90	QF; 90	R32; 10	3,060	20
11	(Belgium) David Goffin	R16; 180	QF; 360	R16; 180	R128; 10	SF; 360	SF; 360	R64; 10	QF; 180	R16; 90	R32; 45	QF; 180	R16; 90	F 300	R16; 90	QF; 90	SF; 90	SF; 90	DC; 75	2,780	20
12	(France) Jo-Wilfried Tsonga	R16; 180	R32; 90	QF; 360	QF; 360	QF; 180	R32; 45	R16; 90	A 0	A 0	R16; 90	QF; 180	QF; 180	SF; 360	F 300	SF; 90	QF; 45	R32; 0		2,550	17
13	(Australia) Nick Kyrgios	R32; 90	R32; 90	R16; 180	R32; 90	R64; 10	SF; 360	QF; 180	R16; 90	R64; 10	R32; 45	R32; 45	A 0	W 500	W 250	W 250	SF; 180	SF; 90	R32; 0	2,460	18
14	(Spain) Roberto Bautista Agut	R16; 180	R16; 180	R32; 90	R32; 90	R32; 45	R16; 90	R16; 90	R32; 45	A 0	R64; 10	F 600	R32; 10	W 250	W 250	F 150	R16; 90	QF; 90	QF; 90	2,350	19

=== Doubles ===
The following teams qualified for the 2016 World Tour Finals.

Rank	Team	Points																		Total Points	Tourn
Rank	Team	1	2	3	4	5	6	7	8	9	10	11	12	13	14	15	16	17	18	Total Points	Tourn
1	(France) Pierre-Hugues Herbert (France) Nicolas Mahut	W 2000	W 1000	W 1000	W 1000	SF; 720	F 600	W 500	SF; 360	R16; 180	QF; 180	F 150	R32; 90	QF; 45						7,825	13
2	(United Kingdom) Jamie Murray (Brazil) Bruno Soares	W 2000	W 2000	F 600	F 600	QF; 360	W 250	R16; 180	QF; 180	QF; 180	QF; 180	QF; 180	SF; 180	QF; 90	QF; 90	QF; 90	SF; 90	R32; 0	R16; 0	7,250	19
3	(United States) Bob Bryan (United States) Mike Bryan	F 1200	W 1000	W 500	QF; 360	QF; 360	SF; 360	SF; 360	SF; 360	W 250	R16; 180	QF; 180	QF; 180	QF; 180	QF; 180	SF; 180	SF; 180	SF; 180	F 150	6,340	22
4	(Spain) Feliciano López (Spain) Marc López	W 2000	SF; 720	SF; 360	F 300	W 250	QF; 180	QF; 180	SF; 180	R32; 90	R16; 90	QF; 90	R32; 0	R32; 0	R32; 0	R32; 0	R16; 0	R16; 0		4,440	17
5	(Finland) Henri Kontinen (Australia) John Peers	W 1000	F 600	W 500	QF; 360	W 250	W 250	QF; 180	QF; 180	QF; 180	SF; 180	SF; 180	SF; 180	R32; 90	R32; 90	R32; 90	R32; 0	R32; 0	R32; 0	4,310	23
6	(Croatia) Ivan Dodig (Brazil) Marcelo Melo	W 1000	W 1000	SF; 720	SF; 360	SF; 360	R16; 180	R16; 180	F 150	R16; 90	QF; 90	R64; 0	R32; 0	R16; 0	R16; 0					4,130	14
7	(South Africa) Raven Klaasen (United States) Rajeev Ram	SF; 720	F 600	W 500	QF; 360	F 300	W 250	QF; 180	QF; 180	F 150	R32; 90	R32; 90	R16; 90	QF; 90	SF; 90	R32; 0	R32; 0	R32; 0	R16; 0	3,690	22
8	(Philippines) Treat Huey (Belarus) Max Mirnyi	SF; 720	W 500	QF; 360	SF; 360	R16; 180	QF; 180	QF; 180	SF; 180	R16; 90	R16; 90	QF; 90	SF; 90	SF; 90	QF; 45	R64; 0	R32; 0	R16; 0	R16; 0	3,155	22
Alternates
(10)	(Colombia) Juan Sebastián Cabal (Colombia) Robert Farah	W 500	SF; 360	W 250	W 250	W 250	R16; 180	SF; 180	SF; 180	F 150	R32; 90	R16; 90	QF; 90	R64; 0	R64; 0	R32; 0	R32; 0	R32; 0	R32; 0	2,570	23

== Head-to-head ==
2016 ATP World Tour Finals – Singles

		Murray	Djokovic	Wawrinka	Raonic	Nishikori	Monfils	Čilić	Thiem	Overall	YTD W–L
1	Andy Murray (GBR)		10–24	9–7	8–3	7–2	4–2	11–3	2–0	51–41	73–9
2	Novak Djokovic (SRB)	24–10		19–5	7–0	10–2	13–0	14–1	3–0	90–18	61–8
3	Stan Wawrinka (SUI)	7–9	5–19		4–1	4–2	2–2	10–2	2–1	34–36	45–16
4	Milos Raonic (CAN)	3–8	0–7	1–4		2–5	2–3	1–1	1–0	10–28	50–15
5	Kei Nishikori (JPN)	2–7	2–10	2–4	5–2		3–0	7–5	2–0	23–28	57–18
6	Gaël Monfils (FRA)	2–4	0–13	2–2	3–2	0–3		2–0	0–1	9–25	44–15
7	Marin Čilić (CRO)	3–11	1–14	2–10	1–1	5–7	0–2		0–1	12–46	47–21
8	Dominic Thiem (AUT)	0–2	0–3	1–2	0–1	0–2	1–0	1–0		3–10	57–22

2016 ATP World Tour Finals – Doubles

		Herbert; Mahut	Murray; Soares	Bryan; Bryan	López; López	Kontinen; Peers	Dodig; Melo	Klaasen; Ram	Huey; Mirnyi	Overall
1	Pierre-Hugues Herbert (FRA) / Nicolas Mahut (FRA)		1–1	2–0	1–1	1–1	1–1	1–0	1–0	8–4
2	Jamie Murray (GBR) / Bruno Soares (BRA)	1–1		0–1	0–3	1–2	1–1	2–1	0–0	5–9
3	Bob Bryan (USA) / Mike Bryan (USA)	0–2	1–0		0–2	0–1	6–3	0–3	2–0	9–11
4	Feliciano López (ESP) / Marc López (ESP)	1–1	3–0	2–0		0–0	1–0	0–1	0–0	7–2
5	Henri Kontinen (FIN) / John Peers (AUS)	1–1	2–1	1–0	0–0		1–1	2–0	2–0	9–3
6	Ivan Dodig (CRO) / Marcelo Melo (BRA)	1–1	1–1	3–6	0–1	1–1		3–1	1–1	10–12
7	Raven Klaasen (RSA) / Rajeev Ram (USA)	0–1	1–2	3–0	1–0	0–2	1–3		1–0	7–8
8	Treat Huey (PHI) / Max Mirnyi (BLR)	0–1	0–0	0–2	0–0	0–2	1–1	0–1		1–7

== See also ==
- ATP rankings
- 2016 WTA Finals
