= 2016 ABN AMRO World Tennis Tournament =

- Date: 8–14 February
- Edition: 43rd
- Category: ATP World Tour 500
- Draw: 32S / 16D
- Prize money: €1,597,155
- Surface: Hard
- Location: Rotterdam, Netherlands
- Venue: Rotterdam Ahoy

Champions

Singles
- (Slovakia) Martin Kližan

Doubles
- (France) Nicolas Mahut / (Canada) Vasek Pospisil

Wheelchair singles
- (United Kingdom) Gordon Reid

Wheelchair doubles
- (France) Stéphane Houdet / (France) Nicolas Peifer
- ABN AMRO World Tennis Tournament

The 2016 ABN AMRO World Tennis Tournament (or Rotterdam Open) was a men's tennis tournament played on indoor hard courts. It took place at the Rotterdam Ahoy arena in the Dutch city of Rotterdam, between 8–14 February 2016. It was the 43rd edition of the Rotterdam Open, whose official name is the ABN AMRO World Tennis Tournament. The competition was part of the ATP World Tour 500 series of the 2016 ATP World Tour.

== Finals ==
=== Singles ===
- (Slovakia) Martin Kližan defeated (France) Gaël Monfils 6–7^{(1–7)}, 6–3, 6–1

=== Doubles ===
- (France) Nicolas Mahut / (Canada) Vasek Pospisil defeated (Germany) Philipp Petzschner / (Austria) Alexander Peya 7–6^{(7–2)}, 6–4

== Points and prize money ==
=== Point distribution ===
Event	W	F	SF	QF	Round of 16	Round of 32	Q	Q2	Q1
Singles	500	300	180	90	45	0	20	10	0
Doubles	500	300	180	90	0	—N/a	45	25	0

=== Prize money ===
Event	W	F	SF	QF	Round of 16	Round of 32^{1}	Q2	Q1
Singles	€363,400	€170,665	€84,750	€43,370	€21,470	€11,300	€1,880	€1,035
Doubles *	€107,100	€50,600	€24,420	€12,700	€6,650	—N/a	—N/a	—N/a

_{^{1} Qualifiers prize money is also the Round of 32 prize money}
_{* per team}

== Singles main-draw entrants ==
=== Seeds ===
Country	Player	Ranking^{1}	Seed
~~FRA~~	~~Richard Gasquet~~	~~10~~	~~1~~
CRO	Marin Čilić	13	2
FRA	Gilles Simon	15	3
BEL	David Goffin	16	4
FRA	Gaël Monfils	17	5
ESP	Roberto Bautista Agut	18	6
FRA	Benoît Paire	21	7
SRB	Viktor Troicki	25	8

- ^{1} Rankings as of February 1, 2016.

=== Other entrants ===
The following players received wildcards into the main draw:

- (Netherlands) Thiemo de Bakker
- (Netherlands) Robin Haase
- (Germany) Alexander Zverev

The following players received entry from the qualifying draw:

- (Croatia) Ivan Dodig
- (Latvia) Ernests Gulbis
- (Russia) Andrey Kuznetsov
- (France) Nicolas Mahut

The following player received entry as a lucky loser:

- (Russia) Evgeny Donskoy

=== Withdrawals ===
Before the tournament

- (Switzerland) Roger Federer (knee injury) →replaced by (South Korea) Chung Hyeon
- (France) Richard Gasquet (flu) →replaced by (Russia) Evgeny Donskoy
- (Australia) Nick Kyrgios (arm injury) →replaced by (Czech Republic) Lukáš Rosol

== Doubles main-draw entrants ==
=== Seeds ===
Country	Player	Country	Player	Rank^{1}	Seed
NED	Jean-Julien Rojer	ROU	Horia Tecău	7	1
CRO	Ivan Dodig	BRA	Marcelo Melo	8	2
GBR	Jamie Murray	CAN	Daniel Nestor	13	3
IND	Rohan Bopanna	ROU	Florin Mergea	20	4

- ^{1} Rankings are as of February 1, 2016.

=== Other entrants ===
The following pairs received wildcards into the main draw:

- (Netherlands) Thiemo de Bakker / (Netherlands) Robin Haase
- (Netherlands) Jesse Huta Galung / (Netherlands) Bart van den Berg

The following pair received entry from the qualifying draw:

- (Croatia) Marin Draganja / (Czech Republic) Lukáš Rosol
