= 2016 Barcelona Open Banc Sabadell – Doubles =

Doubles
- 2016 Barcelona Open Banc Sabadell

Final
- Champions: (United States) Bob Bryan (United States) Mike Bryan
- Runners-up: (Uruguay) Pablo Cuevas (Spain) Marcel Granollers
- Score: 7–5, 7–5

Events
Singles	Doubles
← 2015 ·	Barcelona Open Banc Sabadell	· 2017 →

Marin Draganja and Henri Kontinen were the defending champions, but Draganja chose to compete in Bucharest instead. Kontinen played alongside John Peers, but lost in the first round to Jamie Murray and Bruno Soares.
Bob and Mike Bryan won the title, defeating Pablo Cuevas and Marcel Granollers in the final, 7–5, 7–5.

== Seeds ==
1. (Croatia) Ivan Dodig / (Brazil) Marcelo Melo (first round)
2. (United States) Bob Bryan / (United States) Mike Bryan (champions)
3. (United Kingdom) Jamie Murray / (Brazil) Bruno Soares (quarterfinals)
4. (India) Rohan Bopanna / (Netherlands) Jean-Julien Rojer (quarterfinals)

== Draw ==
=== Key ===
- Q = Qualifier
- WC = Wild card
- LL = Lucky loser
- Alt = Alternate
- SE = Special exempt
- PR = Protected ranking
- ITF = ITF entry
- JE = Junior exempt
- w/o = Walkover
- r = Retired
- d = Defaulted
- SR = Special ranking

=== Draw ===
First round
1	(Croatia) I Dodig (Brazil) M Melo	6^{2}	3
WC	(Uruguay) P Cuevas (Spain) M Granollers	7^{7}	6
Q	(Austria) O Marach (France) F Martin	3	7	[8]
(Canada) D Nestor (Czech Republic) R Štěpánek	6	5	[10]
3	(United Kingdom) J Murray (Brazil) B Soares	6	4	[14]
(Finland) H Kontinen (Australia) J Peers	4	6	[12]
(Spain) F López (Spain) M López	6	3	[10]
(France) É Roger-Vasselin (Serbia) N Zimonjić	2	6	[7]
(Philippines) T Huey (Belarus) M Mirnyi	7^{7}	3	[10]
(Sweden) R Lindstedt (Austria) A Peya	6^{5}	6	[7]
WC	(Spain) P Carreño Busta (Spain) D Marrero	5	3
4	(India) R Bopanna (Netherlands) J-J Rojer	7	6
(Poland) Ł Kubot (Poland) M Matkowski	6	7
(South Africa) R Klaasen (United States) R Ram	3	5
(France) B Paire (Serbia) V Troicki	2	1
2	(United States) B Bryan (United States) M Bryan	6	6

Quarterfinals
WC	(Uruguay) P Cuevas (Spain) M Granollers	7^{12}	6
(Canada) D Nestor (Czech Republic) R Štěpánek	6^{10}	3
3	(United Kingdom) J Murray (Brazil) B Soares	6	2	[6]
(Spain) F López (Spain) M López	3	6	[10]
(Philippines) T Huey (Belarus) M Mirnyi	7^{7}	6
4	(India) R Bopanna (Netherlands) J-J Rojer	6^{5}	4
(Poland) Ł Kubot (Poland) M Matkowski	3	3
2	(United States) B Bryan (United States) M Bryan	6	6

Semifinals
WC	(Uruguay) P Cuevas (Spain) M Granollers	2	6	[10]
(Spain) F López (Spain) M López	6	4	[3]
(Philippines) T Huey (Belarus) M Mirnyi	4	6	[7]
2	(United States) B Bryan (United States) M Bryan	6	3	[10]

Final
WC	(Uruguay) P Cuevas (Spain) M Granollers	5	5
2	(United States) B Bryan (United States) M Bryan	7	7

== Qualifying ==
=== Seeds ===
1. (Austria) Oliver Marach / (France) Fabrice Martin (qualified)
2. (Dominican Republic) Víctor Estrella Burgos / (Italy) Fabio Fognini (first round)

=== Qualifiers ===
1. (Austria) Oliver Marach / (France) Fabrice Martin

=== Qualifying draw ===
First round
1	(Austria) Oliver Marach (France) Fabrice Martin	4	7	[10]
WC	(Spain) Íñigo Cervantes (Spain) Oriol Roca Batalla	6	5	[8]
(Russia) Andrey Kuznetsov (Russia) Teymuraz Gabashvili	6	6
2	(Dominican Republic) Víctor Estrella Burgos (Italy) Fabio Fognini	4	4

Qualifying competition
1	(Austria) Oliver Marach (France) Fabrice Martin	6	6
(Russia) Andrey Kuznetsov (Russia) Teymuraz Gabashvili	2	4
