= 2017 Barcelona Open Banco Sabadell – Singles =

Singles
- 2017 Barcelona Open Banco Sabadell

Final
- Champion: (Spain) Rafael Nadal
- Runner-up: (Austria) Dominic Thiem
- Score: 6–4, 6–1

Details
- Draw: 48 (6 Q / 5 WC )
- Seeds: 16

Events
Singles	Doubles
← 2016 ·	Barcelona Open	· 2018 →

Defending champion Rafael Nadal defeated Dominic Thiem in the final, 6–4, 6–1 to win the singles tennis title at the 2017 Barcelona Open. It was his record-extending tenth Barcelona Open title. The day before this tournament started, Nadal became the first man in the Open Era to win 10 titles at a tournament when he won his 10th Monte Carlo Masters title. By virtue of his 10th Barcelona Open title, he is the first man in the Open Era to win 2 different tournaments 10 times each.

== Seeds ==
All seeds receive a bye into the second round.

1. (United Kingdom) Andy Murray (semifinals)
2. (Japan) Kei Nishikori (withdrew because of a wrist injury)
3. (Spain) Rafael Nadal (champion)
4. (Austria) Dominic Thiem (final)
5. (Belgium) David Goffin (third round)
6. (Spain) Roberto Bautista Agut (third round)
7. (Spain) Pablo Carreño Busta (third round)
8. (Germany) Alexander Zverev (third round)
9. (France) Richard Gasquet (second round)
10. (Spain) Albert Ramos Viñolas (quarterfinals)
11. (Uruguay) Pablo Cuevas (second round)
12. (Germany) Philipp Kohlschreiber (second round)
13. (Spain) David Ferrer (second round)
14. (Germany) Mischa Zverev (second round)
15. (Portugal) João Sousa (second round)
16. (Spain) Feliciano López (third round)
17. (France) Benoît Paire (third round)

Click on the seed number of a player to go to their draw section.

== Draw ==
=== Key ===
- Q = Qualifier
- WC = Wild card
- LL = Lucky loser
- Alt = Alternate
- ITF = ITF entry
- PR = Protected ranking
- SR = Special ranking
- SE = Special exempt
- JE = Junior exempt
- JR = Junior Accelerator Programme entrant
- CO = College Accelerator Programme entrant
- NG = Next Gen Accelerator Program entrant
- w/o = Walkover
- r = Retired
- d = Defaulted

=== Finals ===
Quarterfinals
1/WC	(United Kingdom) Andy Murray	2	6	7^{7}
10	(Spain) Albert Ramos Viñolas	6	4	6^{4}
4	(Austria) Dominic Thiem	6	6
LL	(Japan) Yūichi Sugita	1	2
Q	(South Korea) Chung Hyeon	6^{1}	2
3	(Spain) Rafael Nadal	7^{7}	6
(Russia) Karen Khachanov	4	1
(Argentina) Horacio Zeballos	6	6

Semifinals
1/WC	(United Kingdom) Andy Murray	2	6	4
4	(Austria) Dominic Thiem	6	3	6
3	(Spain) Rafael Nadal	6	6
(Argentina) Horacio Zeballos	3	4

Final
4	(Austria) Dominic Thiem	4	1
3	(Spain) Rafael Nadal	6	6

=== Top half ===
==== Section 1 ====
First round
(Australia) B Tomic	7	4	6
(Germany) D Brown	5	6	2
(Spain) G García López	4	4
WC	(Spain) A Montañés	6	6
(Moldova) R Albot	2	2
Q	(Norway) C Ruud	6	6
(Germany) J-L Struff	7	6
(France) P-H Herbert	5	3

Second round
1/WC	(United Kingdom) A Murray	w/o
(Australia) B Tomic
WC	(Spain) A Montañés	2	2
16	(Spain) F López	6	6
10	(Spain) A Ramos Viñolas	7^{8}	6
Q	(Norway) C Ruud	6^{6}	4
(Germany) J-L Struff	1	3
6	(Spain) R Bautista Agut	6	6

Third round
1/WC	(United Kingdom) A Murray	6	6
16	(Spain) F López	4	4
10	(Spain) A Ramos Viñolas	6	3	6
6	(Spain) R Bautista Agut	2	6	4

Quarterfinals
1/WC	(United Kingdom) A Murray	2	6	7^{7}
10	(Spain) A Ramos Viñolas	6	4	6^{4}

==== Section 2 ====
First round
(United Kingdom) K Edmund	6	6
(France) J Chardy	3	4
(United Kingdom) D Evans	6^{4}	6	7^{7}
Q	(Brazil) T Monteiro	7^{7}	2	6^{2}
LL	(Japan) Y Sugita	6	6
WC	(Spain) T Robredo	4	3
WC	(Sweden) M Ymer	4	3
(Italy) A Seppi	6	6

Second round
4	(Austria) D Thiem	6	6
(United Kingdom) K Edmund	1	4
(United Kingdom) D Evans	6	6
14	(Germany) M Zverev	4	4
9	(France) R Gasquet	6	3	6^{3}
LL	(Japan) Y Sugita	4	6	7^{7}
(Italy) A Seppi	4	2
7	(Spain) P Carreño Busta	6	6

Third round
4	(Austria) D Thiem	7^{7}	6
(United Kingdom) D Evans	6^{5}	2
LL	(Japan) Y Sugita	6	6
7	(Spain) P Carreño Busta	3	3

Quarterfinals
4	(Austria) D Thiem	6	6
LL	(Japan) Y Sugita	1	2

=== Bottom half ===
==== Section 3 ====
First round
(Spain) N Almagro	6	6
Q	(Canada) S Diez	3	4
(Uzbekistan) D Istomin	4	4
Q	(South Korea) H Chung	6	6
(South Africa) K Anderson	2	7^{7}	6
(Argentina) C Berlocq	6	6^{4}	3
(Argentina) R Olivo	1	1
(Brazil) R Dutra Silva	6	6

Second round
8/WC	(Germany) A Zverev	7^{7}	4	6
(Spain) N Almagro	6^{4}	6	4
Q	(South Korea) H Chung	6	6
12	(Germany) P Kohlschreiber	3	4
13	(Spain) D Ferrer	3	4
(South Africa) K Anderson	6	6
(Brazil) R Dutra Silva	1	2
3	(Spain) R Nadal	6	6

Third round
8/WC	(Germany) A Zverev	1	4
Q	(South Korea) H Chung	6	6
(South Africa) K Anderson	3	4
3	(Spain) R Nadal	6	6

Quarterfinals
Q	(South Korea) H Chung	6^{1}	2
3	(Spain) R Nadal	7^{7}	6

==== Section 4 ====
First round
Q	(Japan) T Daniel	3	1
(Georgia (country)) N Basilashvili	6	6
(Russia) K Khachanov	6	6
(Brazil) T Bellucci	3	4
Q	(Colombia) S Giraldo	2	3
(Argentina) H Zeballos	6	6
(Spain) M Granollers	7^{7}	6
(Tunisia) M Jaziri	6^{3}	3

Second round
5	(Belgium) D Goffin	7	6
(Georgia (country)) N Basilashvili	5	0
(Russia) K Khachanov	7^{7}	7^{7}
11	(Uruguay) P Cuevas	6^{5}	6^{5}
15	(Portugal) J Sousa	6^{3}	5
(Argentina) H Zeballos	7^{7}	7
(Spain) M Granollers	3	6^{6}
17	(France) B Paire	6	7^{8}

Third round
5	(Belgium) D Goffin	7^{9}	3	4
(Russia) K Khachanov	6^{7}	6	6
(Argentina) H Zeballos	6	3	7^{7}
17	(France) B Paire	4	6	6^{3}

Quarterfinals
(Russia) K Khachanov	4	1
(Argentina) H Zeballos	6	6

== Qualifying ==
=== Seeds ===
1. (Brazil) Thiago Monteiro (qualified)
2. (Japan) Yūichi Sugita (qualifying competition, lucky loser)
3. (South Korea) Chung Hyeon (qualified)
4. (Colombia) Santiago Giraldo (qualified)
5. (Japan) Taro Daniel (qualified)
6. (Russia) Andrey Rublev (first round)
7. (Spain) Roberto Carballés Baena (first round)
8. (Norway) Casper Ruud (qualified)
9. (Spain) Íñigo Cervantes (first round)
10. (France) Kenny de Schepper (first round, retired)
11. (Argentina) Guido Pella (qualifying competition)
12. (Belarus) Uladzimir Ignatik (first round)

=== Qualifiers ===
1. (Brazil) Thiago Monteiro
2. (Canada) Steven Diez
3. (South Korea) Chung Hyeon
4. (Colombia) Santiago Giraldo
5. (Japan) Taro Daniel
6. (Norway) Casper Ruud

=== Lucky loser ===
1. (Japan) Yūichi Sugita

=== Draw ===
==== First qualifier ====
First round
1	(Brazil) Thiago Monteiro	6	6^{4}	6
(Czech Republic) Lukáš Rosol	3	7^{7}	3
(Spain) Jordi Samper Montaña	4
10	(France) Kenny de Schepper	5^{r}

Qualifying competition
1	(Brazil) Thiago Monteiro	6	6^{4}	6
(Spain) Jordi Samper Montaña	1	7^{7}	1

==== Second qualifier ====
First round
2	(Japan) Yūichi Sugita	7^{7}	6
WC	(Spain) Nicola Kuhn	6^{5}	2
(Canada) Steven Diez	7^{7}	6
12	(Belarus) Uladzimir Ignatik	6^{2}	4

Qualifying competition
2	(Japan) Yūichi Sugita	4	6^{7}
(Canada) Steven Diez	6	7^{9}

==== Third qualifier ====
First round
3	(South Korea) Chung Hyeon	7^{7}	6
(Latvia) Ernests Gulbis	6^{2}	2
(Argentina) Marco Trungelliti	3	3
11	(Argentina) Guido Pella	6	6

Qualifying competition
3	(South Korea) Chung Hyeon	6	6
11	(Argentina) Guido Pella	2	4

==== Fourth qualifier ====
First round
4	(Colombia) Santiago Giraldo	2	7^{7}	6
(Spain) Enrique López Pérez	6	6^{4}	3
WC	(Spain) Alejandro Davidovich Fokina	3	6	6
7	(Spain) Roberto Carballés Baena	6	2	2

Qualifying competition
4	(Colombia) Santiago Giraldo	5	6	6
WC	(Spain) Alejandro Davidovich Fokina	7	3	2

==== Fifth qualifier ====
First round
5	(Japan) Taro Daniel	6	6
WC	(Spain) Jaume Munar	2	1
(Germany) Daniel Brands	6	3	6
9	(Spain) Íñigo Cervantes	4	6	1

Qualifying competition
5	(Japan) Taro Daniel	6	6
(Germany) Daniel Brands	2	4

==== Sixth qualifier ====
First round
6	(Russia) Andrey Rublev	6^{1}	6	3
(Germany) Daniel Masur	7^{7}	3	6
WC	(Spain) Oriol Roca Batalla	4	1
8	(Norway) Casper Ruud	6	6

Qualifying competition
(Germany) Daniel Masur	0	2
8	(Norway) Casper Ruud	6	6
