= 2016 Aegon Championships – Singles =

Singles
- 2016 Queen's Club Championships

Final
- Champion: (United Kingdom) Andy Murray
- Runner-up: (Canada) Milos Raonic
- Score: 6–7^{(5–7)}, 6–4, 6–3

Details
- Draw: 32
- Seeds: 8

Events
Singles	Doubles
← 2015 ·	Queen's Club Championships	· 2017 →

Defending champion Andy Murray defeated Milos Raonic in the final, 6–7^{(5–7)}, 6–4, 6–3 to win the singles tennis title at the 2016 Queen's Club Championships. It was his record fifth Queen's title. This would be the first of two consecutive finals on grass between Murray and Raonic, as the two met again in the final of Wimbledon three weeks later, with Murray again prevailing to win his second Wimbledon and third major title.

== Seeds ==
1. (United Kingdom) Andy Murray (champion)
2. (Switzerland) Stan Wawrinka (first round)
3. (Canada) Milos Raonic (final)
4. (France) Richard Gasquet (first round)
5. (Croatia) Marin Čilić (semifinals)
6. (Spain) Roberto Bautista Agut (quarterfinals)
7. (United States) John Isner (second round)
8. (France) Gilles Simon (first round)

== Draw ==
=== Key ===
- Q = Qualifier
- WC = Wild card
- LL = Lucky loser
- Alt = Alternate
- SE = Special exempt
- PR = Protected ranking
- ITF = ITF entry
- JE = Junior exempt
- w/o = Walkover
- r = Retired
- d = Defaulted
- SR = Special ranking

=== Finals ===
Semifinals
1	(United Kingdom) Andy Murray	6	4	6
5	(Croatia) Marin Čilić	3	6	3
3	(Canada) Milos Raonic	6	6
(Australia) Bernard Tomic	4	4

Final
1	(United Kingdom) Andy Murray	6^{5}	6	6
3	(Canada) Milos Raonic	7^{7}	4	3

=== Top half ===
First round
1	(United Kingdom) A Murray	7^{10}	7^{7}
(France) N Mahut	6^{8}	6^{1}
(United Kingdom) A Bedene	7^{8}	6^{7}	6
(France) B Paire	6^{6}	7^{9}	4
WC	(United Kingdom) D Evans	6^{8}	7^{8}	3
(France) P-H Mathieu	7^{10}	6^{6}	6
WC	(United Kingdom) K Edmund	6	3	6
8	(France) G Simon	4	6	1
4	(France) R Gasquet	6^{2}	2
(United States) S Johnson	7^{7}	6
(Spain) G García-López	4	2
Q	(France) A Mannarino	6	6
(Bulgaria) G Dimitrov	6^{6}	6	3
PR	(Serbia) J Tipsarević	7^{8}	4	6
(Spain) F López	6	3	4
5	(Croatia) M Čilić	4	6	6

Second round
1	(United Kingdom) A Murray	6	6
(United Kingdom) A Bedene	3	4
(France) P-H Mathieu
WC	(United Kingdom) K Edmund	w/o
(United States) S Johnson	4	6	6
Q	(France) A Mannarino	6	3	4
PR	(Serbia) J Tipsarević	4	2
5	(Croatia) M Čilić	6	6

Quarterfinals
1	(United Kingdom) A Murray	6	3	6
WC	(United Kingdom) K Edmund	4	6	1
(United States) S Johnson	7^{7}	3	4
5	(Croatia) M Čilić	6^{3}	6	6

Semifinals
1	(United Kingdom) A Murray	6	4	6
5	(Croatia) M Čilić	3	6	3

=== Bottom half ===
First round
6	(Spain) R Bautista Agut	7^{7}	6^{4}	7^{7}
(United States) S Querrey	6^{2}	7^{7}	6^{1}
Q	(United States) D Young	6	6
Q	(Canada) V Pospisil	3	4
LL	(Czech Republic) J Veselý	7^{7}	6^{5}	6
(France) J Chardy	6^{3}	7^{7}	4
(Australia) N Kyrgios	7^{7}	4	4
3	(Canada) M Raonic	6^{5}	6	6
7	(United States) J Isner	7^{7}	6
PR	(Argentina) JM del Potro	6^{2}	4
WC	(United Kingdom) J Ward	4	4
(Luxembourg) G Müller	6	6
(Australia) B Tomic	6	6
Q	(South Africa) K Anderson	3	4
(Spain) F Verdasco	6	7^{7}
2	(Switzerland) S Wawrinka	2	6^{3}

Second round
6	(Spain) R Bautista Agut	6	6
Q	(United States) D Young	4	2
LL	(Czech Republic) J Veselý	5	6^{6}
3	(Canada) M Raonic	7	7^{8}
7	(United States) J Isner	6	6^{16}	6^{7}
(Luxembourg) G Müller	3	7^{18}	7^{9}
(Australia) B Tomic	6^{2}	6	6
(Spain) F Verdasco	7^{7}	4	4

Quarterfinals
6	(Spain) R Bautista Agut	1	4
3	(Canada) M Raonic	6	6
(Luxembourg) G Müller	6^{5}	6	2
(Australia) B Tomic	7^{7}	4	6

Semifinals
3	(Canada) M Raonic	6	6
(Australia) B Tomic	4	4

== Qualifying ==
=== Seeds ===
1. (South Africa) Kevin Anderson (qualified)
2. (Canada) Vasek Pospisil (qualified)
3. (France) Adrian Mannarino (qualified)
4. (Australia) John Millman (first round)
5. (Czech Republic) Jiří Veselý (qualifying competition, lucky loser)
6. (United States) Donald Young (qualified)
7. (Serbia) Dušan Lajović (first round)
8. (Australia) Sam Groth (qualifying competition)

=== Qualifiers ===
1. (South Africa) Kevin Anderson
2. (Canada) Vasek Pospisil
3. (France) Adrian Mannarino
4. (United States) Donald Young

=== Lucky losers ===
1. (Czech Republic) Jiří Veselý

=== Qualifying draw ===
==== First qualifier ====
First round
1	(South Africa) Kevin Anderson	6	6
WC	(United Kingdom) Edward Corrie	3	3
(Israel) Amir Weintraub	6	6^{6}	4
5	(Czech Republic) Jiří Veselý	1	7^{8}	6

Qualifying competition
1	(South Africa) Kevin Anderson	7^{7}	7^{7}
5	(Czech Republic) Jiří Veselý	6^{2}	6^{5}

==== Second qualifier ====
First round
2	(Canada) Vasek Pospisil	7^{7}	7^{8}
WC	(United States) Stefan Kozlov	6^{5}	6^{6}
(Germany) Tobias Kamke	6	6
7	(Serbia) Dušan Lajović	1	3

Qualifying competition
2	(Canada) Vasek Pospisil	3	7	6
(Germany) Tobias Kamke	6	5	3

==== Third qualifier ====
First round
3/Alt	(France) Adrian Mannarino	6	7
(France) Kenny de Schepper	2	5
(Australia) James Duckworth	3	7^{7}	6^{1}
8	(Australia) Sam Groth	6	6^{4}	7^{7}

Qualifying competition
3/Alt	(France) Adrian Mannarino	6	6
8	(Australia) Sam Groth	2	2

==== Fourth qualifier ====
First round
4	(Australia) John Millman	4	3
(United States) Frances Tiafoe	6	6
WC	(United Kingdom) Alexander Ward	3	6^{5}
6	(United States) Donald Young	6	7^{7}

Qualifying competition
(United States) Frances Tiafoe	3	3
6	(United States) Donald Young	6	6
