= 2016 Barcelona Open Banc Sabadell =

- Date: 18–24 April
- Edition: 64th
- Category: ATP World Tour 500
- Draw: 48S / 16D
- Prize money: €2,152,690
- Surface: Clay
- Location: Barcelona, Spain
- Venue: Real Club de Tenis Barcelona

Champions

Singles
- (Spain) Rafael Nadal

Doubles
- (United States) Bob Bryan / (United States) Mike Bryan
← 2015 ·	Barcelona Open	· 2017 →

The 2016 Barcelona Open Banc Sabadell (also known as the Torneo Godó) was a men's tennis tournament played on outdoor clay courts. It was the 64th edition of the event and part of the ATP World Tour 500 series of the 2016 ATP World Tour. It took place at the Real Club de Tenis Barcelona in Barcelona, Catalonia, Spain, from 18 April until 24 April 2016. First-seeded Rafael Nadal won the singles title.

== Points and prize money ==
=== Points distribution ===
Event	W	F	SF	QF	Round of 16	Round of 32	Round of 64	Q	Q2	Q1
Singles	500	300	180	90	45	20	0	10	4	0
Doubles	500	300	180	90	0	—	—	45	25	0

=== Prize money ===
Event	W	F	SF	QF	Round of 16	Round of 32	Round of 64	Q2	Q1
Singles	€460,000	€218,750	€104,150	€52,075	€26,060	€13,935	€7,950	€1,590	€810
Doubles	€143,000	€68,000	€33,520	€17,200	€8,960	—	—	—	—

== Singles main-draw entrants ==
=== Seeds ===
Country	Player	Rank^{1}	Seed
ESP	Rafael Nadal	5	1
JPN	Kei Nishikori	6	2
~~ESP~~	~~David Ferrer~~	~~8~~	~~3~~
~~FRA~~	~~Richard Gasquet~~	~~10~~	~~4~~
ESP	Roberto Bautista Agut	17	5
FRA	Benoît Paire	22	6
ESP	Feliciano López	23	7
SRB	Viktor Troicki	24	8
URU	Pablo Cuevas	25	9
GER	Philipp Kohlschreiber	28	10
UKR	Alexandr Dolgopolov	29	11
ITA	Fabio Fognini	31	12
FRA	Jérémy Chardy	33	13
POR	João Sousa	34	14
BRA	Thomaz Bellucci	35	15
RUS	Andrey Kuznetsov	46	16

- ^{1} Rankings as of April 11, 2016.

=== Other entrants ===
The following players received wildcards into the main draw:

- (Spain) Albert Montañés
- (Spain) Jaume Munar
- (France) Benoît Paire
- (Sweden) Elias Ymer

The following players received entry from the qualifying draw:

- (Argentina) Pedro Cachin
- (Hungary) Márton Fucsovics
- (Russia) Karen Khachanov
- (Croatia) Franko Škugor
- (Czech Republic) Radek Štěpánek
- (Germany) Jan-Lennard Struff

The following players received entry as a lucky loser:

- (Argentina) Renzo Olivo
- (France) Édouard Roger-Vasselin

=== Withdrawals ===
Before the tournament

- (South Africa) Kevin Anderson →replaced by (Colombia) Santiago Giraldo
- (Spain) Pablo Andújar →replaced by (Kazakhstan) Mikhail Kukushkin
- (Spain) David Ferrer →replaced by (France) Édouard Roger-Vasselin
- (France) Richard Gasquet →replaced by (Argentina) Renzo Olivo
- (Slovakia) Martin Kližan →replaced by (Netherlands) Thiemo de Bakker
- (Argentina) Leonardo Mayer →replaced by (Spain) Marcel Granollers
- (Spain) Tommy Robredo →replaced by (Argentina) Facundo Bagnis

== Doubles main-draw entrants ==
=== Seeds ===
Country	Player	Country	Player	Rank^{1}	Seed
CRO	Ivan Dodig	BRA	Marcelo Melo	11	1
USA	Bob Bryan	USA	Mike Bryan	13	2
GBR	Jamie Murray	BRA	Bruno Soares	13	3
IND	Rohan Bopanna	NED	Jean-Julien Rojer	15	4

- Rankings are as of April 11, 2016.

=== Other entrants ===
The following pairs received wildcards into the doubles main draw:

- (Spain) Pablo Carreño Busta / (Spain) David Marrero
- (Uruguay) Pablo Cuevas / (Spain) Marcel Granollers

The following pair received entry from the qualifying draw:

- (Austria) Oliver Marach / (France) Fabrice Martin

== Finals ==
=== Singles ===
- (Spain) Rafael Nadal defeated (Japan) Kei Nishikori, 6–4, 7–5

=== Doubles ===
- (United States) Bob Bryan / (United States) Mike Bryan defeated (Uruguay) Pablo Cuevas / (Spain) Marcel Granollers, 7–5, 7–5.
