= 2016 ABN AMRO World Tennis Tournament – Singles =

Singles
- 2016 ABN AMRO World Tennis Tournament

Final
- Champion: (Slovakia) Martin Kližan
- Runner-up: (France) Gaël Monfils
- Score: 6–7^{(1–7)}, 6–3, 6–1

Details
- Draw: 32 (4 Q / 3 WC )
- Seeds: 8

Events
Singles	Doubles
- ABN AMRO World Tennis Tournament

Stan Wawrinka was the defending champion, but chose not to participate this year.

Martin Kližan won the title, defeating Gaël Monfils in the final, 6–7^{(1–7)}, 6–3, 6–1.

== Seeds ==
1. (France) Richard Gasquet (withdrew due to groin strain)
2. (Croatia) Marin Čilić (quarterfinals)
3. (France) Gilles Simon (second round)
4. (Belgium) David Goffin (first round)
5. (France) Gaël Monfils (final)
6. (Spain) Roberto Bautista Agut (quarterfinals)
7. (France) Benoît Paire (first round)
8. (Serbia) Viktor Troicki (quarterfinals)

== Draw ==
Key

- Q = Qualifier
- WC = Wild card
- LL = Lucky loser
- Alt = Alternate
- ITF = ITF entry
- PR = Protected ranking
- SR = Special ranking
- SE = Special exempt
- JE = Junior exempt
- JR = Junior Accelerator Programme entrant
- CO = College Accelerator Programme entrant
- NG = Next Gen Accelerator Program entrant
- w/o = Walkover
- r = Retired
- d = Defaulted

=== Finals ===
Semifinals
Q	(France) Nicolas Mahut	7^{7}	6^{7}	2
(Slovakia) Martin Kližan	6^{3}	7^{9}	6
5	(France) Gaël Monfils	6	6
(Germany) Philipp Kohlschreiber	3	2

Final
(Slovakia) Martin Kližan	6^{1}	6	6
5	(France) Gaël Monfils	7^{7}	3	1

=== Top half ===
First round
LL	(Russia) E Donskoy	7^{11}	4	6^{8}
(France) J Chardy	6^{9}	6	7^{10}
Q	(France) N Mahut	6	7^{7}
(Russia) T Gabashvili	4	6^{4}
(Spain) G García-López	7	4	4
(South Korea) H Chung	5	6	6
Q	(Russia) A Kuznetsov	6	6^{2}	3
8	(Serbia) V Troicki	4	7^{7}	6
4	(Belgium) D Goffin	1	7	6^{5}
(Cyprus) M Baghdatis	6	5	7^{7}
(Spain) T Robredo	2	7^{7}	3
(Slovakia) M Kližan	6	6^{5}	6
(Czech Republic) L Rosol	4	2
(Czech Republic) J Veselý	6	6
(Portugal) J Sousa	6^{4}	6	3
6	(Spain) R Bautista Agut	7^{7}	1	6

Second round
(France) J Chardy	5	2
Q	(France) N Mahut	7	6
(South Korea) H Chung	6^{5}	2
8	(Serbia) V Troicki	7^{7}	6
(Cyprus) M Baghdatis	3	2
(Slovakia) M Kližan	6	6
(Czech Republic) J Veselý	6	2	4
6	(Spain) R Bautista Agut	4	6	6

Quarterfinals
Q	(France) N Mahut	6	6
8	(Serbia) V Troicki	2	1
(Slovakia) M Kližan	6^{5}	7^{8}	6
6	(Spain) R Bautista Agut	7^{7}	6^{6}	0

Semifinals
Q	(France) N Mahut	7^{7}	6^{7}	2
(Slovakia) M Kližan	6^{3}	7^{9}	6

=== Bottom half ===
First round
5	(France) G Monfils	6	6
Q	(Latvia) E Gulbis	4	4
(Croatia) B Ćorić	7^{11}	4	6
WC	(Netherlands) T de Bakker	6^{9}	6	3
(Canada) V Pospisil	5	2
WC	(Germany) A Zverev	7	6
WC	(Netherlands) R Haase	6^{5}	1
3	(France) G Simon	7^{7}	6
7	(France) B Paire	3	6^{4}
Q	(Croatia) I Dodig	6	7^{7}
(Germany) P Kohlschreiber	6	6
PR	(France) J Benneteau	4	4
(Italy) A Seppi	6	6^{2}	4
(Luxembourg) G Müller	4	7^{7}	6
(Uzbekistan) D Istomin	6^{5}	4
2	(Croatia) M Čilić	7^{7}	6

Second round
5	(France) G Monfils	6	5	6
(Croatia) B Ćorić	3	7	2
WC	(Germany) A Zverev	7	3	7^{7}
3	(France) G Simon	5	6	6^{4}
Q	(Croatia) I Dodig	4	2
(Germany) P Kohlschreiber	6	6
(Luxembourg) G Müller	6^{2}	6^{7}
2	(Croatia) M Čilić	7^{7}	7^{9}

Quarterfinals
5	(France) G Monfils	7^{7}	6
WC	(Germany) A Zverev	6^{4}	3
(Germany) P Kohlschreiber	3	6	6
2	(Croatia) M Čilić	6	3	4

Semifinals
5	(France) G Monfils	6	6
(Germany) P Kohlschreiber	3	2

== Qualifying ==
=== Seeds ===
1. (Russia) Andrey Kuznetsov (qualified)
2. (France) Nicolas Mahut (qualified)
3. (Ukraine) Sergiy Stakhovsky (first round)
4. (Latvia) Ernests Gulbis (qualified)
5. (Russia) Evgeny Donskoy (qualifying competition , lucky loser)
6. (Croatia) Ivan Dodig (qualified)
7. (France) Lucas Pouille (qualifying competition)
8. (Belgium) Steve Darcis (qualifying competition, withdrew)

=== Qualifiers ===
1. (Russia) Andrey Kuznetsov
2. (France) Nicolas Mahut
3. (Croatia) Ivan Dodig
4. (Latvia) Ernests Gulbis

=== Lucky losers ===
1. (Russia) Evgeny Donskoy

=== Qualifying draw ===
==== First qualifier ====
First round
1	(Russia) Andrey Kuznetsov	6	6
WC	(Netherlands) Jesse Huta Galung	2	3
(Italy) Thomas Fabbiano	6^{1}	3
8	(Belgium) Steve Darcis	7^{7}	6

Qualifying competition
1	(Russia) Andrey Kuznetsov	w/o
8	(Belgium) Steve Darcis

==== Second qualifier ====
First round
2	(France) Nicolas Mahut	6	6
WC	(Netherlands) Tallon Griekspoor	3	2
(Slovakia) Lukáš Lacko	6^{6}	6^{5}
7	(France) Lucas Pouille	7^{8}	7^{7}

Qualifying competition
2	(France) Nicolas Mahut	7^{7}	7^{7}
7	(France) Lucas Pouille	6^{5}	6^{5}

==== Third qualifier ====
First round
3	(Ukraine) Sergiy Stakhovsky	4	6	6^{7}
(Germany) Jan-Lennard Struff	6	3	7^{9}
(Belgium) Kimmer Coppejans	4	2
6	(Croatia) Ivan Dodig	6	6

Qualifying competition
(Germany) Jan-Lennard Struff	4	6^{4}
6	(Croatia) Ivan Dodig	6	7^{7}

==== Fourth qualifier ====
First round
4	(Latvia) Ernests Gulbis	4	6	7^{7}
(France) Édouard Roger-Vasselin	6	2	6^{3}
WC	(Netherlands) Tim van Rijthoven	6^{1}	2
5	(Russia) Evgeny Donskoy	7^{7}	6

Qualifying competition
4	(Latvia) Ernests Gulbis	6	6
5	(Russia) Evgeny Donskoy	1	2
