= 2016 Aegon Championships – Doubles =

Doubles
- 2016 Aegon Championships

Final
- Champions: (France) Pierre-Hugues Herbert (France) Nicolas Mahut
- Runners-up: (Australia) Chris Guccione (Brazil) André Sá
- Score: 6–3, 7–6^{(7–5)}

Details
- Draw: 16

Events
Singles	Doubles
- Queen's Club Championships

Pierre-Hugues Herbert and Nicolas Mahut were the defending champions and successfully defended their title, defeating Chris Guccione and André Sá in the final, 6–3, 7–6^{(7–5)}.

== Seeds ==
1. (France) Pierre-Hugues Herbert / (France) Nicolas Mahut (champions)
2. (United Kingdom) Jamie Murray / (Brazil) Bruno Soares (quarterfinals)
3. (Netherlands) Jean-Julien Rojer / (Romania) Horia Tecău (quarterfinals)
4. (India) Rohan Bopanna / (Romania) Florin Mergea (first round)

== Draw ==
Key

- Q = Qualifier
- WC = Wild card
- LL = Lucky loser
- Alt = Alternate
- ITF = ITF entry
- PR = Protected ranking
- SR = Special ranking
- SE = Special exempt
- JE = Junior exempt
- JR = Junior Accelerator Programme entrant
- CO = College Accelerator Programme entrant
- NG = Next Gen Accelerator Program entrant
- w/o = Walkover
- r = Retired
- d = Defaulted

=== Draw ===
First round
1	(France) P-H Herbert (France) N Mahut	6	6
(United Kingdom) D Inglot (Canada) D Nestor	3	3
(Spain) F López (Spain) M López	6^{5}	4
PR	(Argentina) JM del Potro (Brazil) M Melo	7^{7}	6
3	(Netherlands) J-J Rojer (Romania) H Tecău	7^{9}	7^{7}
(Canada) V Pospisil (Canada) M Raonic	6^{7}	6^{3}
WC	(Israel) J Erlich (United Kingdom) C Fleming	0	6	[10]
WC	(United Kingdom) A Bedene (United Kingdom) K Edmund	6	2	[6]
(United States) J Isner (Poland) M Matkowski	6^{3}	3
PR	(Croatia) M Čilić (Croatia) M Draganja	7^{7}	6
PR	(France) J Benneteau (France) É Roger-Vasselin	3	6	[12]
4	(India) R Bopanna (Romania) F Mergea	6	3	[10]
Q	(Australia) C Guccione (Brazil) A Sá	6	6
(South Africa) K Anderson (Spain) R Bautista Agut	2	4
LL	(United States) S Johnson (United States) N Monroe	6^{2}	3
2	(United Kingdom) J Murray (Brazil) B Soares	7^{7}	6

Quarterfinals
1	(France) P-H Herbert (France) N Mahut	6	6
PR	(Argentina) JM del Potro (Brazil) M Melo	4	4
3	(Netherlands) J-J Rojer (Romania) H Tecău	6	6^{7}	[8]
WC	(Israel) J Erlich (United Kingdom) C Fleming	2	7^{9}	[10]
PR	(Croatia) M Čilić (Croatia) M Draganja	5	4
PR	(France) J Benneteau (France) É Roger-Vasselin	7	6
Q	(Australia) C Guccione (Brazil) A Sá	7^{7}	6^{4}	[10]
2	(United Kingdom) J Murray (Brazil) B Soares	6^{3}	7^{7}	[3]

Semifinals
1	(France) P-H Herbert (France) N Mahut	6^{2}	7^{7}	[10]
WC	(Israel) J Erlich (United Kingdom) C Fleming	7^{7}	6^{3}	[8]
PR	(France) J Benneteau (France) É Roger-Vasselin	3	7	[5]
Q	(Australia) C Guccione (Brazil) A Sá	6	5	[10]

Final
1	(France) P-H Herbert (France) N Mahut	6	7^{7}
Q	(Australia) C Guccione (Brazil) A Sá	3	6^{5}

== Qualifying ==
=== Seeds ===
1. (United States) Steve Johnson / (United States) Nicholas Monroe (qualifying competition, Lucky losers)
2. (Australia) Chris Guccione / (Brazil) André Sá (qualified)

=== Qualifiers ===
1. (Australia) Chris Guccione / (Brazil) André Sá

=== Lucky losers ===
1. (United States) Steve Johnson / (United States) Nicholas Monroe

=== Qualifying draw ===
First round
1	(United States) Steve Johnson (United States) Nicholas Monroe	6	6
(Spain) Guillermo García-López (France) Adrian Mannarino	3	2
WC	(United Kingdom) Ken Skupski (United Kingdom) Neal Skupski	4	5
2	(Australia) Chris Guccione (Brazil) André Sá	6	7

Qualifying competition
1	(United States) Steve Johnson (United States) Nicholas Monroe	3	6^{2}
2	(Australia) Chris Guccione (Brazil) André Sá	6	7^{7}
