= 2016 ABN AMRO World Tennis Tournament – Doubles =

Doubles
- 2016 ABN AMRO World Tennis Tournament

Final
- Champions: (France) Nicolas Mahut (Canada) Vasek Pospisil
- Runners-up: (Germany) Philipp Petzschner (Austria) Alexander Peya
- Score: 7–6^{(7–2)}, 6–4

Events
Singles	Doubles
← 2015 ·	ABN AMRO World Tennis Tournament	· 2017 →

Jean-Julien Rojer and Horia Tecău were the defending champions, but lost in the semifinals to Philipp Petzschner and Alexander Peya.
Nicolas Mahut and Vasek Pospisil won the title, defeating Petzschner and Peya in the final, 7–6^{(7–2)}, 6–4.

== Seeds ==
1. (Netherlands) Jean-Julien Rojer / (Romania) Horia Tecău (semifinals)
2. (Croatia) Ivan Dodig / (Brazil) Marcelo Melo (quarterfinals)
3. (United Kingdom) Jamie Murray / (Canada) Daniel Nestor (first round)
4. (India) Rohan Bopanna / (Romania) Florin Mergea (quarterfinals)

== Draw ==
=== Key ===
- Q = Qualifier
- WC = Wild card
- LL = Lucky loser
- Alt = Alternate
- SE = Special exempt
- PR = Protected ranking
- ITF = ITF entry
- JE = Junior exempt
- w/o = Walkover
- r = Retired
- d = Defaulted
- SR = Special ranking

=== Draw ===
First round
1	(Netherlands) J-J Rojer (Romania) H Tecău	6	6
(Spain) G García-López (Serbia) V Troicki	3	2
(Luxembourg) G Müller (Serbia) N Zimonjić	6	6
WC	(Netherlands) T de Bakker (Netherlands) R Haase	3	4
3	(United Kingdom) J Murray (Canada) D Nestor	2	7	[8]
(Germany) P Petzschner (Austria) A Peya	6	5	[10]
Q	(Croatia) M Draganja (Czech Republic) L Rosol	7	2	[5]
(United Kingdom) D Inglot (Sweden) R Lindstedt	5	6	[10]
(Italy) A Seppi (Portugal) J Sousa	3	6^{3}
(France) N Mahut (Canada) V Pospisil	6	7^{7}
(Poland) Ł Kubot (Poland) M Matkowski	7^{9}	3	[7]
4	(India) R Bopanna (Romania) F Mergea	6^{7}	6	[10]
(Finland) H Kontinen (Australia) J Peers	7^{7}	6
PR	(France) J Benneteau (France) É Roger-Vasselin	6^{3}	4
WC	(Netherlands) J Huta Galung (Netherlands) B van den Berg	2	5
2	(Croatia) I Dodig (Brazil) M Melo	6	7

Quarterfinals
1	(Netherlands) J-J Rojer (Romania) H Tecău	6	6
(Luxembourg) G Müller (Serbia) N Zimonjić	3	3
(Germany) P Petzschner (Austria) A Peya	6	4	[10]
(United Kingdom) D Inglot (Sweden) R Lindstedt	3	6	[4]
(France) N Mahut (Canada) V Pospisil	3	6	[10]
4	(India) R Bopanna (Romania) F Mergea	6	3	[8]
(Finland) H Kontinen (Australia) J Peers	3	7^{7}	[10]
2	(Croatia) I Dodig (Brazil) M Melo	6	6^{2}	[7]

Semifinals
1	(Netherlands) J-J Rojer (Romania) H Tecău	6^{5}	6	[9]
(Germany) P Petzschner (Austria) A Peya	7^{7}	3	[11]
(France) N Mahut (Canada) V Pospisil	6^{7}	7^{8}	[10]
(Finland) H Kontinen (Australia) J Peers	7^{9}	6^{6}	[4]

Final
(Germany) P Petzschner (Austria) A Peya	6^{2}	4
(France) N Mahut (Canada) V Pospisil	7^{7}	6

== Qualifying ==
=== Seeds ===
1. (Croatia) Marin Draganja / (Czech Republic) Lukáš Rosol (qualified)
2. (United Kingdom) Colin Fleming / (Ukraine) Sergiy Stakhovsky (first round)

=== Qualifiers ===
1. (Croatia) Marin Draganja / (Czech Republic) Lukáš Rosol

=== Qualifying draw ===
First round
1	(Croatia) Marin Draganja (Czech Republic) Lukáš Rosol	6	6
(Belarus) Aliaksandr Bury (South Korea) Chung Hyeon	3	3
WC	(Netherlands) Tallon Griekspoor (Netherlands) Tim van Rijthoven	3	6	[10]
2	(United Kingdom) Colin Fleming (Ukraine) Sergiy Stakhovsky	6	4	[8]

Qualifying competition
1	(Croatia) Marin Draganja (Czech Republic) Lukáš Rosol	6^{5}	7^{7}	[10]
WC	(Netherlands) Tallon Griekspoor (Netherlands) Tim van Rijthoven	7^{7}	6^{3}	[2]
