= 2016 Aegon Championships =

Tennis tournament edition

- Date: 13 – 19 June
- Edition: 114th
- Category: World Tour 500
- Draw: 32S / 16D
- Prize money: €1,802,945
- Surface: Grass
- Location: London, United Kingdom
- Venue: Queen's Club

Champions

Singles
- (United Kingdom) Andy Murray

Doubles
- (France) Pierre-Hugues Herbert / (France) Nicolas Mahut
- Queen's Club Championships

The 2016 Aegon Championships, also known as the Queen's Club Championships, was a men's tennis tournament played on outdoor grass courts. It was the 114th edition of those championships and part of the ATP World Tour 500 series of the 2016 ATP World Tour. It took place at the Queen's Club in London, United Kingdom from 13 June until 19 June 2016. First-seeded Andy Murray won the singles tour.

== Finals ==
=== Singles ===
- (United Kingdom) Andy Murray defeated (Canada) Milos Raonic, 6–7^{(5–7)}, 6–4, 6–3

=== Doubles ===
- (France) Pierre-Hugues Herbert / (France) Nicolas Mahut defeated (Australia) Chris Guccione / (Brazil) André Sá, 6–3, 7–6^{(7–5)}

== Points and prize money ==
=== Point distribution ===
Event	W	F	SF	QF	Round of 16	Round of 32	Q	Q2	Q1
Singles	500	300	180	90	45	0	20	10	0
Doubles	500	300	180	90	0	—N/a	—N/a	—N/a	—N/a

=== Prize money ===
Event	W	F	SF	QF	Round of 16	Round of 32	Q	Q2	Q1
Singles	€410,200	€192,650	€95,665	€47,830	€24,235	€12,755	€0	€2,125	€1,170
Doubles*	€120,900	€57,130	€27,570	€14,340	€7,510	—N/a	—N/a	—N/a	—N/a

_{*per team}

== Singles main draw entrants ==
=== Seeds ===
Country	Player	Rank^{1}	Seed
GBR	Andy Murray	2	1
SUI	Stan Wawrinka	5	2
CAN	Milos Raonic	9	3
FRA	Richard Gasquet	10	4
CRO	Marin Čilić	13	5
ESP	Roberto Bautista Agut	16	6
USA	John Isner	17	7
FRA	Gilles Simon	18	8

- Rankings are as of June 6, 2016.

=== Other entrants ===
The following players received wildcards into the singles main draw:

- (United Kingdom) Kyle Edmund
- (United Kingdom) Daniel Evans
- (United Kingdom) James Ward

The following players using a protected ranking into the singles main draw:

- (Argentina) Juan Martín del Potro
- (Serbia) Janko Tipsarević

The following players received entry from the qualifying draw:

- (South Africa) Kevin Anderson
- (France) Adrian Mannarino
- (Canada) Vasek Pospisil
- (United States) Donald Young

The following player received entry as a lucky loser:

- (Czech Republic) Jiří Veselý

=== Withdrawals ===
Before the tournament

- (Ukraine) Alexandr Dolgopolov →replaced by (Czech Republic) Jiří Veselý
- (Argentina) Leonardo Mayer →replaced by (Spain) Fernando Verdasco
- (Spain) Rafael Nadal (left wrist injury) →replaced by (United Kingdom) Aljaž Bedene
- (France) Jo-Wilfried Tsonga →replaced by (France) Paul-Henri Mathieu

During the tournament

- (France) Paul-Henri Mathieu

== Doubles main draw entrants ==
=== Seeds ===
Country	Player	Country	Player	Rank^{1}	Seed
FRA	Pierre-Hugues Herbert	FRA	Nicolas Mahut	4	1
GBR	Jamie Murray	BRA	Bruno Soares	11	2
NED	Jean-Julien Rojer	ROU	Horia Tecău	13	3
IND	Rohan Bopanna	ROU	Florin Mergea	21	4

- Rankings are as of June 6, 2016.

=== Other entrants ===
The following pairs received wildcards into the doubles main draw:

- (United Kingdom) Aljaž Bedene / (United Kingdom) Kyle Edmund
- (Israel) Jonathan Erlich / (United Kingdom) Colin Fleming

The following pair received entry from the qualifying draw:

- (Australia) Chris Guccione / (Brazil) André Sá

The following pair received entry as lucky losers:

- (United States) Steve Johnson / (United States) Nicholas Monroe
