= 2016 Argentina Open =

Men's tennis tournament

- Date: 8–14 February
- Edition: 19th
- Category: ATP World Tour 250 series
- Draw: 28S / 16D
- Prize money: $523,470
- Surface: Clay / outdoor
- Location: Buenos Aires, Argentina

Champions

Singles
- (Austria) Dominic Thiem

Doubles
- (Colombia) Juan Sebastián Cabal / (Colombia) Robert Farah
← 2015 ·	ATP Buenos Aires	· 2017 →

The 2016 Argentina Open was a men's tennis tournament played on outdoor clay courts. It was the 19th edition of the ATP Buenos Aires event, and part of the ATP World Tour 250 series of the 2016 ATP World Tour. It took place in Buenos Aires, Argentina, from 8 February through 14 February 2016. Fifth-seeded Dominic Thiem won the singles title.

== Finals ==
=== Singles ===
- (Austria) Dominic Thiem defeated (Spain) Nicolás Almagro 7–6^{(7–2)}, 3–6, 7–6^{(7–4)}

=== Doubles ===
- (Colombia) Juan Sebastián Cabal / (Colombia) Robert Farah defeated (Spain) Íñigo Cervantes / (Italy) Paolo Lorenzi 6–3, 6–0

== Points and prize money ==
=== Point distribution ===
Event	W	F	SF	QF	Round of 16	Round of 32	Q	Q2	Q1
Singles	250	150	90	45	20	0	12	6	0
Doubles	250	150	90	45	0	—	—	—	—

=== Prize money ===
Event	W	F	SF	QF	Round of 16	Round of 32	Q2	Q1
Singles	$93,120	$49,045	$26,570	$15,135	$8,920	$5,285	$2,380	$1,190
Doubles	$28,290	$14,870	$8,060	$4,610	$2,700	—	—	—
Doubles prize money per team

== Singles main-draw entrants ==
=== Seeds ===
Country	Player	Rank^{1}	Seed
ESP	Rafael Nadal	5	1
ESP	David Ferrer	6	2
FRA	Jo-Wilfried Tsonga	9	3
USA	John Isner	12	4
AUT	Dominic Thiem	19	5
ITA	Fabio Fognini	24	6
UKR	Alexandr Dolgopolov	32	7
URU	Pablo Cuevas	36	8

- Rankings are as of February 1, 2016.

=== Other entrants ===
The following players received wildcards into the main draw:

- (Italy) Fabio Fognini
- (Spain) Rafael Nadal
- (Argentina) Renzo Olivo

The following players received entry from the qualifying draw:

- (Argentina) Facundo Bagnis
- (Italy) Marco Cecchinato
- (Portugal) Gastão Elias
- (Spain) Albert Montañés

The following player received entry as a lucky loser:

- (Argentina) Facundo Argüello

=== Withdrawals ===
Before the tournament

- (United Kingdom) Aljaž Bedene →replaced by (Spain) Nicolás Almagro
- (Austria) Andreas Haider-Maurer →replaced by (Argentina) Guido Pella
- (United States) Jack Sock →replaced by (Spain) Daniel Muñoz de la Nava
- (Spain) Fernando Verdasco (late withdrawal) →replaced by (Argentina) Facundo Argüello

== Doubles main-draw entrants ==
=== Seeds ===
Country	Player	Country	Player	Rank^{1}	Seed
COL	Juan Sebastián Cabal	COL	Robert Farah	51	1
ARG	Máximo González	BRA	André Sá	98	2
ESP	David Marrero	GER	Frank Moser	156	3
ARG	Guillermo Durán	ARG	Leonardo Mayer	157	4

- ^{1} Rankings are as of February 1, 2016.

=== Other entrants ===
The following pairs received wildcards into the main draw:

- (Argentina) Facundo Argüello / (Argentina) Facundo Bagnis
- (Argentina) Tomás Lipovšek Puches / (Argentina) Manuel Peña López
