= 2016 Argentina Open – Singles =

Singles
- 2016 Argentina Open

Final
- Champion: (Austria) Dominic Thiem
- Runner-up: (Spain) Nicolás Almagro
- Score: 7–6^{(7–2)}, 3–6, 7–6^{(7–4)}

Details
- Draw: 28
- Seeds: 8

Events
Singles	Doubles
- Argentina Open

Dominic Thiem defeated Nicolás Almagro in the final, 7–6^{(7–2)}, 3–6, 7–6^{(7–4)}. He saved a match point en route to the title against defending champion Rafael Nadal in the semifinals.

== Seeds ==
The top four seeds receive a bye into the second round.

1. (Spain) Rafael Nadal (semifinals)
2. (Spain) David Ferrer (semifinals)
3. (France) Jo-Wilfried Tsonga (quarterfinals)
4. (United States) John Isner (second round)
5. (Austria) Dominic Thiem (champion)
6. (Italy) Fabio Fognini (first round)
7. (Ukraine) Alexandr Dolgopolov (first round)
8. (Uruguay) Pablo Cuevas (quarterfinals)

== Draw ==
Key

- Q = Qualifier
- WC = Wild card
- LL = Lucky loser
- Alt = Alternate
- ITF = ITF entry
- PR = Protected ranking
- SR = Special ranking
- SE = Special exempt
- JE = Junior exempt
- JR = Junior Accelerator Programme entrant
- CO = College Accelerator Programme entrant
- NG = Next Gen Accelerator Program entrant
- w/o = Walkover
- r = Retired
- d = Defaulted

=== Finals ===
Semifinals
1/WC	(Spain) Rafael Nadal	4	6	6^{4}
5	(Austria) Dominic Thiem	6	4	7^{7}
(Spain) Nicolás Almagro	6	7
2	(Spain) David Ferrer	4	5

Final
5	(Austria) Dominic Thiem	7^{7}	3	7^{7}
(Spain) Nicolás Almagro	6^{2}	6	6^{4}

=== Top half ===
First round
Q	(Italy) M Cecchinato	1	3
(Argentina) J Mónaco	6	6
(Italy) P Lorenzi	2	7	6
(Spain) P Andújar	6	5	2
(Argentina) D Schwartzman	5	6	6
7	(Ukraine) A Dolgopolov	7	4	3
(Serbia) D Lajović	7^{9}	6
LL	(Argentina) F Argüello	6^{7}	3
Q	(Portugal) G Elias	4	6	6
(Spain) D Muñoz de la Nava	6	4	1
(Spain) P Carreño Busta	0	6	3
5	(Austria) D Thiem	6	3	6

Second round
1/WC	(Spain) R Nadal	6	6
(Argentina) J Mónaco	4	4
(Italy) P Lorenzi	4	6	6
(Argentina) D Schwartzman	6	3	1
4	(United States) J Isner	6^{10}	6	6^{6}
(Serbia) D Lajović	7^{12}	4	7^{8}
Q	(Portugal) G Elias	6	6^{7}	3
5	(Austria) D Thiem	3	7^{9}	6

Quarterfinals
1/WC	(Spain) R Nadal	7^{7}	6
(Italy) P Lorenzi	6^{3}	2
(Serbia) D Lajović	4	2
5	(Austria) D Thiem	6	6

Semifinals
1/WC	(Spain) R Nadal	4	6	6^{4}
5	(Austria) D Thiem	6	4	7^{7}

=== Bottom half ===
First round
6/WC	(Italy) F Fognini	7^{7}	4	4
(Argentina) F Delbonis	6^{4}	6	6
Q	(Spain) A Montañés	3	3
(Spain) N Almagro	6	6
(Argentina) L Mayer	2	6	6
(Argentina) G Pella	6	3	3
8	(Uruguay) P Cuevas	7	6
(Spain) A Ramos Viñolas	5	2
(Colombia) S Giraldo	6	7
(Spain) I Cervantes	1	5
Q	(Argentina) F Bagnis	6^{9}	5
WC	(Argentina) R Olivo	7^{11}	7

Second round
(Argentina) F Delbonis	3	6	4
(Spain) N Almagro	6	4	6
(Argentina) L Mayer	1	2
3	(France) J-W Tsonga	6	6
8	(Uruguay) P Cuevas	6	6
(Colombia) S Giraldo	4	2
WC	(Argentina) R Olivo	2	2
2	(Spain) D Ferrer	6	6

Quarterfinals
(Spain) N Almagro	6	7
3	(France) J-W Tsonga	2	5
8	(Uruguay) P Cuevas	4	6	3
2	(Spain) D Ferrer	6	1	6

Semifinals
(Spain) N Almagro	6	7
2	(Spain) D Ferrer	4	5

== Qualifying ==
=== Seeds ===
1. (Italy) Marco Cecchinato (qualified)
2. (Argentina) Facundo Bagnis (qualified)
3. (Spain) Daniel Gimeno Traver (first round)
4. (Spain) Albert Montañés (qualified)
5. (Argentina) Facundo Argüello (qualifying competition, Lucky loser)
6. (Portugal) Gastão Elias (qualified)
7. (Argentina) Máximo González (first round)
8. (Slovenia) Blaž Rola (qualifying competition)

=== Qualifiers ===
1. (Italy) Marco Cecchinato
2. (Argentina) Facundo Bagnis
3. (Portugal) Gastão Elias
4. (Spain) Albert Montañés

=== Lucky loser ===
1. (Argentina) Facundo Argüello

=== Qualifying draw ===
==== First qualifier ====
First round
1	(Italy) Marco Cecchinato	6	6
(Argentina) Juan Ignacio Galarza	1	2
WC	(Argentina) Andrea Collarini	3	6^{6}
5	(Argentina) Facundo Argüello	6	7^{8}

Qualifying competition
1	(Italy) Marco Cecchinato	6	7
5	(Argentina) Facundo Argüello	3	5

==== Second qualifier ====
First round
2	(Argentina) Facundo Bagnis	6	6^{5}	6
(Argentina) Pedro Cachin	2	7^{7}	0
(Argentina) Hernán Casanova	0	2
8	(Slovenia) Blaž Rola	6	6

Qualifying competition
2	(Argentina) Facundo Bagnis	7	6
8	(Slovenia) Blaž Rola	5	1

==== Third qualifier ====
First round
3	(Spain) Daniel Gimeno Traver	3	2
(Brazil) Guilherme Clezar	6	6
WC	(Argentina) Tomás Lipovšek Puches	2	6^{4}
6	(Portugal) Gastão Elias	6	7^{7}

Qualifying competition
(Brazil) Guilherme Clezar	5	6^{9}
6	(Portugal) Gastão Elias	7	7^{11}

==== Fourth qualifier ====
First round
4	(Spain) Albert Montañés	7^{8}	7^{7}
(Brazil) José Pereira	6^{5}	6^{6}
(Italy) Filippo Volandri	6	4	6
7	(Argentina) Máximo González	4	6	4

Qualifying competition
4	(Spain) Albert Montañés	6	6
(Italy) Filippo Volandri	3	4
