= 2016 Barcelona Open Banc Sabadell – Singles =

Singles
- 2016 Barcelona Open Banc Sabadell

Final
- Champion: (Spain) Rafael Nadal
- Runner-up: (Japan) Kei Nishikori
- Score: 6–4, 7–5

Details
- Draw: 48 (6 Q / 4 WC )
- Seeds: 16

Events
| Singles | Doubles |
| ← 2015 · | Barcelona Open | · 2017 → |

Rafael Nadal defeated the two-time defending champion Kei Nishikori in the final, 6–4, 7–5 to win the singles title at the 2016 Barcelona Open. It was Nadal's record-extending ninth title at the Barcelona Open and his 49th clay court title, equaling Guillermo Vilas' record for the most titles on clay.

== Seeds ==
All seeds receive a bye into the second round.

1. (Spain) Rafael Nadal (champion)
2. (Japan) Kei Nishikori (final)
3. (Spain) David Ferrer (withdrew because of a calf injury)
4. (France) Richard Gasquet (withdrew because of a back injury)
5. (Spain) Roberto Bautista Agut (second round)
6. (France) Benoît Paire (semifinals)
7. (Spain) Feliciano López (third round)
8. (Serbia) Viktor Troicki (third round)

9. (Uruguay) Pablo Cuevas (third round)
10. (Germany) Philipp Kohlschreiber (semifinals)
11. (Ukraine) Alexandr Dolgopolov (quarterfinals)
12. (Italy) Fabio Fognini (quarterfinals)
13. (France) Jérémy Chardy (third round)
14. (Portugal) João Sousa (second round)
15. (Brazil) Thomaz Bellucci (second round)
16. (Russia) Andrey Kuznetsov (quarterfinals)

Click on the seed number of a player to go to their draw section.

== Draw ==
=== Key ===
- Q = Qualifier
- WC = Wild card
- LL = Lucky loser
- Alt = Alternate
- SE = Special exempt
- PR = Protected ranking
- ITF = ITF entry
- JE = Junior exempt
- w/o = Walkover
- r = Retired
- d = Defaulted
- SR = Special ranking

=== Finals ===
Quarterfinals
1 | (Spain) Rafael Nadal | 6 | 7^{7}
12 | (Italy) Fabio Fognini | 2 | 6^{1}
16 | (Russia) Andrey Kuznetsov | 3 | 1
10 | (Germany) Philipp Kohlschreiber | 6 | 6
6/WC | (France) Benoît Paire | 3 | 7 | 6
(Tunisia) Malek Jaziri | 6 | 5 | 1
11 | (Ukraine) Alexandr Dolgopolov | 5 | 0
2 | (Japan) Kei Nishikori | 7 | 6

Semifinals
1 | (Spain) Rafael Nadal | 6 | 6
10 | (Germany) Philipp Kohlschreiber | 3 | 3
6/WC | (France) Benoît Paire | 3 | 2
2 | (Japan) Kei Nishikori | 6 | 6

Final
1 | (Spain) Rafael Nadal | 6 | 7
2 | (Japan) Kei Nishikori | 4 | 5

=== Top half ===
==== Section 1 ====
First round
(Spain) M Granollers | 6 | 6
(Spain) D Muñoz de la Nava | 4 | 3
(Spain) R Carballés Baena | 3 | 3
WC | (Spain) A Montañés | 6 | 6
(United States) R Ram | 2 | 2
(Russia) M Youzhny | 6 | 6
Q | (Hungary) M Fucsovics | 5 | 6 | 6
(Latvia) E Gulbis | 7 | 4 | 1

Second round
1 | (Spain) R Nadal | 6 | 6
(Spain) M Granollers | 3 | 2
WC | (Spain) A Montañés | 6 | 6
14 | (Portugal) J Sousa | 1 | 3
12 | (Italy) F Fognini | 3 | 6 | 6
(Russia) M Youzhny | 6 | 0 | 1
Q | (Hungary) M Fucsovics | 4 | 6 | 0
8 | (Serbia) V Troicki | 6 | 1 | 6

Third round
1 | (Spain) R Nadal | 6 | 6
WC | (Spain) A Montañés | 2 | 2
12 | (Italy) F Fognini | 6 | 6
8 | (Serbia) V Troicki | 3 | 2

Quarterfinals
1 | (Spain) R Nadal | 6 | 7^{7}
12 | (Italy) F Fognini | 2 | 6^{1}

==== Section 2 ====
First round
(Colombia) S Giraldo | 4 | 5
Q | (Czech Republic) R Štěpánek | 6 | 7
Q | (Croatia) F Škugor | 3 | 4
(Spain) Í Cervantes | 6 | 6
(Spain) P Carreño Busta | 7 | 7
(Uzbekistan) D Istomin | 5 | 5
Q | (Argentina) P Cachin | 7 | 2 | 4
(Croatia) I Dodig | 5 | 6 | 6

Second round
LL | (France) É Roger-Vasselin | 7^{7} | 1 | 4
Q | (Czech Republic) R Štěpánek | 6^{5} | 6 | 6
(Spain) Í Cervantes | 6^{4} | 4
16 | (Russia) A Kuznetsov | 7^{7} | 6
10 | (Germany) P Kohlschreiber | 6 | 6
(Spain) P Carreño Busta | 2 | 1
(Croatia) I Dodig | 6^{5} | 4
7 | (Spain) F López | 7^{7} | 6

Third round
Q | (Czech Republic) R Štěpánek | 2 | 4
16 | (Russia) A Kuznetsov | 6 | 6
10 | (Germany) P Kohlschreiber | 6^{5} | 7 | 6
7 | (Spain) F López | 7^{7} | 5 | 3

Quarterfinals
16 | (Russia) A Kuznetsov | 3 | 1
10 | (Germany) P Kohlschreiber | 6 | 6

=== Bottom half ===
==== Section 3 ====
First round
(Russia) T Gabashvili | 1 | 7^{7} | 6
(Spain) N Almagro | 6 | 6^{3} | 2
(Spain) A Ramos Viñolas | 6 | 6
WC | (Spain) J Munar | 3 | 2
Q | (Germany) J-L Struff | 4 | 3
(Germany) A Zverev | 6 | 6
(Tunisia) M Jaziri | 6 | 6
(South Korea) H Chung | 3 | 4

Second round
6/WC | (France) B Paire | 6 | 7
(Russia) T Gabashvili | 2 | 5
(Spain) A Ramos Viñolas | 4 | 5
9 | (Uruguay) P Cuevas | 6 | 7
15 | (Brazil) T Bellucci | 3 | 7^{7} | 5
(Germany) A Zverev | 6 | 6^{3} | 7
(Tunisia) M Jaziri | 6 | 4 | 6
LL | (Argentina) R Olivo | 1 | 6 | 3

Third round
6/WC | (France) B Paire | 6 | 6
9 | (Uruguay) P Cuevas | 2 | 4
(Germany) A Zverev | 6^{5} | 4
(Tunisia) M Jaziri | 7^{7} | 6

Quarterfinals
6/WC | (France) B Paire | 3 | 7 | 6
(Tunisia) M Jaziri | 6 | 5 | 1

==== Section 4 ====
First round
Q | (Russia) K Khachanov | 3 | 6 | 7^{7}
(United Kingdom) A Bedene | 6 | 3 | 6^{2}
(Argentina) F Bagnis | 5 | 6^{5}
(Russia) E Donskoy | 7 | 7^{7}
(Kazakhstan) M Kukushkin | 6 | 2 | 2
(Dominican Republic) V Estrella Burgos | 3 | 6 | 6
(Netherlands) T de Bakker | 6 | 6^{3} | 6
WC | (Sweden) E Ymer | 4 | 7^{7} | 3

Second round
5 | (Spain) R Bautista Agut | 2 | 7^{7} | 3
Q | (Russia) K Khachanov | 6 | 6^{4} | 6
(Russia) E Donskoy | 6 | 6^{9} | 4
11 | (Ukraine) A Dolgopolov | 4 | 7^{11} | 6
13 | (France) J Chardy | 7 | 6
(Dominican Republic) V Estrella Burgos | 5 | 2
(Netherlands) T de Bakker | 4 | 2
2 | (Japan) K Nishikori | 6 | 6

Third round
Q | (Russia) K Khachanov | 4 | 5
11 | (Ukraine) A Dolgopolov | 6 | 7
13 | (France) J Chardy | 3 | 5
2 | (Japan) K Nishikori | 6 | 7

Quarterfinals
11 | (Ukraine) A Dolgopolov | 5 | 0
2 | (Japan) K Nishikori | 7 | 6

== Qualifying ==
=== Seeds ===
1. (Germany) Jan-Lennard Struff (qualified)
2. (Russia) Karen Khachanov (qualified)
3. (Slovakia) Jozef Kovalík (first round)
4. (Turkey) Marsel İlhan (first round)
5. (France) Kenny de Schepper (first round)
6. (Croatia) Franko Škugor (qualified)
7. (Argentina) Renzo Olivo (qualifying competition, lucky loser)
8. (Russia) Andrey Rublev (first round)
9. (Czech Republic) Radek Štěpánek (qualified)
10. (Serbia) Peđa Krstin (qualifying competition)
11. (France) Édouard Roger-Vasselin (qualifying competition, lucky loser)
12. (Argentina) Marco Trungelliti (qualifying competition)

=== Qualifiers ===
1. (Germany) Jan-Lennard Struff
2. (Russia) Karen Khachanov
3. (Argentina) Pedro Cachin
4. (Hungary) Márton Fucsovics
5. (Czech Republic) Radek Štěpánek
6. (Croatia) Franko Škugor

=== Lucky losers ===
1. (Argentina) Renzo Olivo
2. (France) Édouard Roger-Vasselin

=== Qualifying draw ===
==== First qualifier ====
First round
1 | (Germany) Jan-Lennard Struff | 6 | 7^{7}
WC | (Spain) Pedro Martínez | 3 | 6^{4}
(Spain) Oriol Roca Batalla | 2 | 6 | 3
11 | (France) Édouard Roger-Vasselin | 6 | 4 | 6

Qualifying competition
1 | (Germany) Jan-Lennard Struff | 7^{7} | 6
11 | (France) Édouard Roger-Vasselin | 6^{5} | 2

==== Second qualifier ====
First round
2 | (Russia) Karen Khachanov | 6 | 3 | 6
(India) Ramkumar Ramanathan | 4 | 6 | 3
(Japan) Yasutaka Uchiyama | 4 | 5
12 | (Argentina) Marco Trungelliti | 6 | 7

Qualifying competition
2 | (Russia) Karen Khachanov | 6 | 4 | 7^{7}
12 | (Argentina) Marco Trungelliti | 3 | 6 | 6^{4}

==== Third qualifier ====
First round
3 | (Slovakia) Jozef Kovalík | 4 | 5
(Argentina) Pedro Cachin | 6 | 7
(Spain) Adrián Menéndez Maceiras | 4 | 4
10 | (Serbia) Peđa Krstin | 6 | 6

Qualifying competition
(Argentina) Pedro Cachin | 6 | 6
10 | (Serbia) Peđa Krstin | 1 | 2

==== Fourth qualifier ====
First round
4 | (Turkey) Marsel İlhan | 6 | 2 | 5
(Spain) Jordi Samper Montaña | 2 | 6 | 7
(Hungary) Márton Fucsovics | 7^{7} | 6^{5} | 6
8 | (Russia) Andrey Rublev | 6^{5} | 7^{7} | 3

Qualifying competition
(Spain) Jordi Samper Montaña | 2 | 6 | 2
(Hungary) Márton Fucsovics | 6 | 3 | 6

==== Fifth qualifier ====
First round
5 | (France) Kenny de Schepper | 6^{2} | 6 | 6^{2}
WC | (Chile) Cristian Garín | 7^{7} | 4 | 7^{7}
WC | (Spain) Gerard Granollers | 3 | 2
9 | (Czech Republic) Radek Štěpánek | 6 | 6

Qualifying competition
WC | (Chile) Cristian Garín | 3 | 4
9 | (Czech Republic) Radek Štěpánek | 6 | 6

==== Sixth qualifier ====
First round
6 | (Croatia) Franko Škugor | 6 | 6
(France) Yannick Jankovits | 0 | 2
WC | (Germany) Nicola Kuhn | 4 | 6 | 3
7 | (Argentina) Renzo Olivo | 6 | 0 | 6

Qualifying competition
6 | (Croatia) Franko Škugor | 6 | 3 | 6
7 | (Argentina) Renzo Olivo | 2 | 6 | 2
