= 2017 Barcelona Open Banco Sabadell =

- Date: 24–30 April
- Edition: 65th
- Category: ATP World Tour 500
- Draw: 48S / 16D
- Prize money: €2,324,905
- Surface: Clay / outdoor
- Location: Barcelona, Spain
- Venue: Real Club de Tenis Barcelona

Champions

Singles
- (Spain) Rafael Nadal

Doubles
- (Romania) Florin Mergea / (Pakistan) Aisam-ul-Haq Qureshi
← 2016 ·	Barcelona Open	· 2018 →

The 2017 Barcelona Open Banco Sabadell (also known as the Torneo Godó) was a men's tennis tournament played on outdoor clay courts. It was the 65th edition of the event and part of the ATP World Tour 500 series of the 2017 ATP World Tour. It took place at the Real Club de Tenis Barcelona in Barcelona, Catalonia, Spain, from 24 April until 30 April 2017. Third-seeded Rafael Nadal won the singles title.

== Points and prize money ==
=== Points distribution ===
Event	W	F	SF	QF	Round of 16	Round of 32	Round of 64	Q	Q2	Q1
Singles	500	300	180	90	45	20	0	10	4	0
Doubles	500	300	180	90	0	—	—	45	25	0

=== Prize money ===
Event	W	F	SF	QF	Round of 16	Round of 32	Round of 64	Q2	Q1
Singles	€464,260	€227,585	€114,540	€58,245	€30,250	€15,955	€8,615	€1,910	€975
Doubles	€150,780	€73,820	€37,030	€19,000	€9,830	—	—	—	—

== Singles main-draw entrants ==
=== Seeds ===
Country	Player	Rank^{1}	Seed
GBR	Andy Murray	1	1
~~JPN~~	~~Kei Nishikori~~	~~5~~	~~2~~
ESP	Rafael Nadal	7	3
AUT	Dominic Thiem	9	4
BEL	David Goffin	13	5
ESP	Roberto Bautista Agut	18	6
ESP	Pablo Carreño Busta	19	7
GER	Alexander Zverev	20	8
FRA	Richard Gasquet	22	9
ESP	Albert Ramos Viñolas	24	10
URU	Pablo Cuevas	27	11
GER	Philipp Kohlschreiber	30	12
ESP	David Ferrer	33	13
GER	Mischa Zverev	35	14
POR	João Sousa	36	15
ESP	Feliciano López	39	16
FRA	Benoît Paire	40	17

- ^{1} Rankings as of April 17, 2017.

=== Other entrants ===
The following players received wildcards into the main draw:

- (Spain) Albert Montañés
- (United Kingdom) Andy Murray
- (Spain) Tommy Robredo
- (Sweden) Mikael Ymer
- (Germany) Alexander Zverev

The following players received entry from the qualifying draw:

- (South Korea) Chung Hyeon
- (Japan) Taro Daniel
- (Canada) Steven Diez
- (Colombia) Santiago Giraldo
- (Brazil) Thiago Monteiro
- (Norway) Casper Ruud

The following player received entry as a lucky loser:

- (Japan) Yūichi Sugita

=== Withdrawals ===
Before the tournament

- (Czech Republic) Tomáš Berdych →replaced by (Argentina) Renzo Olivo
- (Japan) Kei Nishikori (wrist injury) →replaced by (Japan) Yūichi Sugita
- (Japan) Yoshihito Nishioka →replaced by (Germany) Dustin Brown
- (United States) Donald Young →replaced by (Moldova) Radu Albot

== Doubles main-draw entrants ==
=== Seeds ===
Country	Player	Country	Player	Rank^{1}	Seed
FIN	Henri Kontinen	AUS	John Peers	3	1
GBR	Jamie Murray	BRA	Bruno Soares	15	2
CRO	Ivan Dodig	ESP	Marcel Granollers	27	3
ESP	Feliciano López	ESP	Marc López	31	4

- Rankings are as of April 17, 2017.

=== Other entrants ===
The following pairs received wildcards into the doubles main draw:

- (Spain) Pablo Carreño Busta / (Spain) Juan Carlos Ferrero
- (Spain) Jaume Munar / (Spain) Albert Ramos Viñolas

The following pair received entry from the qualifying draw:

- (New Zealand) Marcus Daniell / (Brazil) Marcelo Demoliner

== Finals ==
=== Singles ===
- (Spain) Rafael Nadal defeated (Austria) Dominic Thiem, 6–4, 6–1

=== Doubles ===
- (Romania) Florin Mergea / (Pakistan) Aisam-ul-Haq Qureshi defeated (Germany) Philipp Petzschner / (Austria) Alexander Peya, 6–4, 6–3
