= 2016 Argentina Open – Doubles =

Doubles
- 2016 Argentina Open

Final
- Champions: (Colombia) Juan Sebastián Cabal; (Colombia) Robert Farah
- Runners-up: (Spain) Íñigo Cervantes; (Italy) Paolo Lorenzi
- Score: 6–3, 6–0

Events
Singles	Doubles
← 2015 ·	Argentina Open	· 2017 →

Jarkko Nieminen and André Sá were the defending champions, but Nieminen did not compete due to his retirement from professional tennis. Sá played alongside Máximo González, but lost in the first round to Gero Kretschmer and Alexander Satschko.
Juan Sebastián Cabal and Robert Farah won the title, defeating Íñigo Cervantes and Paolo Lorenzi in the final, 6–3, 6–0.

== Seeds ==
1. (Colombia) Juan Sebastián Cabal / (Colombia) Robert Farah (champions)
2. (Argentina) Máximo González / (Brazil) André Sá (first round)
3. (Spain) David Marrero / (Germany) Frank Moser (semifinal)
4. (Argentina) Guillermo Durán / (Argentina) Leonardo Mayer (first round)

== Draw ==
=== Key ===
- Q = Qualifier
- WC = Wild card
- LL = Lucky loser
- Alt = Alternate
- SE = Special exempt
- PR = Protected ranking
- ITF = ITF entry
- JE = Junior exempt
- w/o = Walkover
- r = Retired
- d = Defaulted
- SR = Special ranking

=== Draw ===
First round

Quarterfinals

Semifinals

Final

1
- (Colombia) JS Cabal
- (Colombia) R Farah
7^{7}
6

- (Brazil) M Demoliner
- (Spain) A Ramos Viñolas
6^{5}
2

1
- (Colombia) JS Cabal
- (Colombia) R Farah
6
6^{5}
[10]

- (Spain) D Muñoz de la Nava
- (France) J-W Tsonga
3
5

- (Serbia) D Lajović
- (Austria) D Thiem
4
7^{7}
[8]

- (Serbia) D Lajović
- (Austria) D Thiem
6
7

1
- (Colombia) JS Cabal
- (Colombia) R Farah
4
6
[10]

3
- (Spain) D Marrero
- (Germany) F Moser
3
6
[10]

3
- (Spain) D Marrero
- (Germany) F Moser
6
3
[6]

- (Spain) N Almagro
- (Colombia) S Giraldo
6
3
[7]

3
- (Spain) D Marrero
- (Germany) F Moser
6
2
[10]

- (Argentina) G Pella
- (Argentina) D Schwartzman
6
6

- (Argentina) G Pella
- (Argentina) D Schwartzman
4
6
[6]

WC
- (Argentina) T Lipovšek Puches
- (Argentina) M Peña López
4
1

1
- (Colombia) JS Cabal
- (Colombia) R Farah
6
6

- (Argentina) F Delbonis
- (Argentina) A Molteni
7
6

- (Spain) I Cervantes
- (Italy) P Lorenzi
3
0

- (Italy) F Fognini
- (Argentina) J Mónaco
5
3

- (Argentina) F Delbonis
- (Argentina) A Molteni
6
7^{7}

WC
- (Argentina) F Argüello
- (Argentina) F Bagnis
4
6
[10]

WC
- (Argentina) F Argüello
- (Argentina) F Bagnis
4
6^{2}

4
- (Argentina) G Durán
- (Argentina) L Mayer
6
4
[3]

- (Argentina) F Delbonis
- (Argentina) A Molteni
6^{5}
5

- (Spain) P Andújar
- (Spain) P Carreño Busta
4
4

- (Spain) I Cervantes
- (Italy) P Lorenzi
7^{7}
7

- (Spain) I Cervantes
- (Italy) P Lorenzi
6
6

- (Spain) I Cervantes
- (Italy) P Lorenzi
4
6
[10]

- (Germany) G Kretschmer
- (Germany) A Satschko
6
7

- (Germany) G Kretschmer
- (Germany) A Satschko
6
4
[6]

2
- (Argentina) M González
- (Brazil) A Sá
1
5
