= 2016 Andy Murray tennis season =

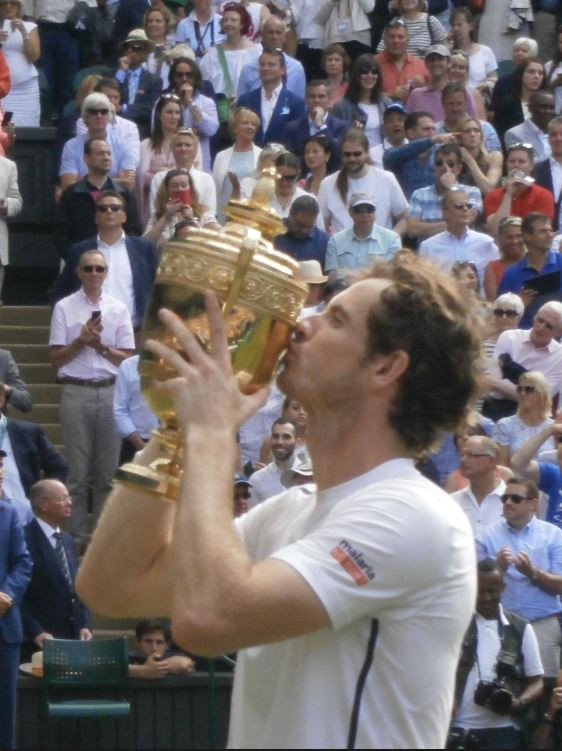
- Murray after winning the 2016 Wimbledon Championships
- Full name: Andy Murray
- Country: United Kingdom
- Calendar prize money: $16,349,701

Singles
- Season record: 78–9
- Calendar titles: 9
- Year-end ranking: No. 1
- Ranking change from previous year: ▲1

Grand Slam & significant results
- Australian Open: F
- French Open: F
- Wimbledon: W
- US Open: QF
- Other tournaments
- Tour Finals: W

Doubles
- Season record: 4–3
- Calendar titles: 0
- Year-end ranking: No. 353
- Ranking change from previous year: ▼204

Grand Slam doubles results
- Other Doubles tournaments
- Olympic Games: 1R

Mixed doubles
- Season record: 1–1
- Calendar titles: 0

Grand Slam mixed doubles results
- Other Mixed Doubles tournaments
- Olympic Games: QF

Davis Cup
- Davis Cup: SF
- Last updated on: 26 December 2016.

Andy Murray's 2016 tennis season began at the Australian Open. The 2016 season was Murray's greatest season, as he finished the season as the year-end world No. 1 player and clinched the year-end prize money title. Andy and Jamie Murray, also became the first brothers to finish as year-end No. 1 ranked players in singles and doubles team, respectively. He won an ATP-best and career-high nine Tour titles from 13 finals (from 17 tournaments), including his second Wimbledon crown and second successive Olympic gold medal in singles, thus becoming the first person, man or woman, to defend the Olympic singles title. In the 2016 season, Murray became the first male player to win singles titles at a Grand Slam, the Olympics, a Masters 1000 event, and the ATP Finals in the same calendar year (Serena Williams, in 2012, is the only other person to accomplish this feat).

On 7 November, Murray became the first British man and 26th male player to attain the world No. 1-ranking in singles since records began in 1973, displacing long-time rival and friend, Novak Djokovic. At 29 years, 5 months and 23 days, Murray is the oldest first-time singles No. 1 in the last 40 years. He reached the No. 1 ranking despite the fact that, in contrast to previous years, no ranking points were awarded for the Olympics. Djokovic had a 3–2 edge in matches between the two in 2016, including winning their two matches in Grand Slam finals (Australian and French Opens). Murray had a 1–1 record against Rafael Nadal in the year.

The following are also career firsts for a single season for Murray: (1) won ≥$16,000,000 in prize money, (2) amassed 78 match wins, (3) reached 13 Tour finals, (4) won nine Tour titles, (5) won three Masters 1000 titles, (6) reached five Masters 1000 finals, (7) reached three Grand Slam finals, (8) won 24 consecutive matches, (9) won five consecutive tournament titles, (10) reached seven consecutive tournament finals, (11) won 16 matches against top-10 opponents.

Murray ended the season by winning his last 24 matches, reaching the finals in 12 of his last 13 tournaments, and winning titles in his last five tournaments. In winning the 2016 ATP WTF, Murray defeated the No. 2 (Djokovic), No. 3 (Wawrinka), No. 4 (Raonic), No. 5 (Nishikori), and No. 7 (Cilic) in 5 consecutive matches.

== Year summary ==
=== Australian Open and early hard court season ===
Prior to the Australian Open, Murray paired with Heather Watson to compete in the Hopman Cup. They were knocked out in the round robin stage after winning 2 out of 3 ties.

==== Australian Open ====
Murray came through the opening two rounds of the Australian Open in straight sets against Alexander Zverev and Sam Groth for a combined loss of only 11 games. He followed this up with a four set win over João Sousa in the third round and a straight set win over Bernard Tomic in the fourth round to reach the quarterfinals.

In the quarterfinals Murray defeated David Ferrer in four sets. The match lasted over three hours, however Ferrer did not manage to hit a single ace.

Murray next played Milos Raonic in the semifinals. In another long affair, lasting over four hours, Murray came through in five sets to reach his fifth Australian Open Final.

In the final Murray played Novak Djokovic. It was their fourth meeting in an Australian Open final, with Djokovic having won the other three. Murray was not able to overcome the Serb and after losing the first five games ended up going down in three sets.

==== Davis Cup First round ====
After taking February off to spend time with his new daughter, Sophia, Murray returned to action against Japan in the first round of the Davis Cup. He won his first singles rubber against Taro Daniel in straight sets before joining his brother Jamie to win the doubles against Yoshihito Nishioka and Yasutaka Uchiyama, also in straight sets. In his second singles rubber he defeated Kei Nishikori in five sets, having been two sets up at one point, thus securing the tie for Great Britain.

==== BNP Paribas Open, Indian Wells ====
Murray began the first Masters series tournament of the year by beating Marcel Granollers in straight sets, but then lost to Federico Delbonis in the next round in three sets, despite holding a 4–1 lead in the third set.

==== Miami Masters ====
Murray exited at the third round for the second tournament in a row, beating Denis Istomin in straight sets but losing to Grigor Dimitrov in the following match. Several commentators suggested that Murray was looking "exhausted", and that his form had appeared to drop since becoming a father for the first time.

=== European clay court season and Roland Garros ===
==== Monte-Carlo Masters ====
In his first tournament on clay of the year, Murray beat Pierre-Hugues Herbert in his first match in three sets and recovered from a set and double-break down to beat Benoît Paire, reaching his first quarter-final since the Australian Open. There he beat Raonic for the second time in the year, losing just two games in the match, but lost to eventual champion Rafael Nadal in the semi-final.

Murray also competed in the doubles with partner Dominic Inglot, reaching the quarter-finals before losing to Herbert and Nicolas Mahut.

==== Madrid Open ====
Murray arrived in Madrid as the defending champion, and defeated Radek Štěpánek, Gilles Simon and Tomáš Berdych on the way to a second semi-final of the year against Nadal, this time winning in straight sets. In the final he lost to Novak Djokovic in three sets, a result that saw Murray fall to number three in the world rankings for the first time in 2016.

==== Italian Open ====
Prior to the tournament, it was announced that Murray's coach, Amélie Mauresmo, would no longer be working with him. In the tournament itself, Murray recorded victories over Mikhail Kukushkin, Jérémy Chardy, David Goffin and Lucas Pouille, all in straight sets, to reach his first final in the Rome Masters. Once again he faced Djokovic, but this time won, again in straight sets, to win his first title of 2016 and 12th Masters title overall, as a result returning to the #2 ranking.

==== Roland Garros ====
In his first round match, Murray was drawn against Radek Štěpánek and lost the first two sets, winning the third set before the match was suspended due to bad light. He recovered to win the match the following day in five sets. In the second round Murray again had to come from behind to win in five sets, this time against wild card Frenchman Mathias Bourgue. In the third and fourth rounds Murray won in straight sets against Ivo Karlović and John Isner respectively, before defeating Richard Gasquet in four sets to reach his fourth French Open semi-final. There he defeated defending champion Stanislas Wawrinka to reach his first final at the French Open and tenth overall, also becoming the tenth man in the Open Era to have reached all four Slam finals at least once. In the final he again played Novak Djokovic, their third tournament final in a row, winning the first set before eventually losing in four sets.

=== Grass Court Season ===
As the grass court season began, Murray announced that he would again be working with former coach Ivan Lendl, after they had split in 2014.

==== Queen's Club Championships ====
Murray defeated Nicolas Mahut in the first round, and then played his first tour-level matches against fellow Britons since losing to Tim Henman quickly made in 2006, defeating Aljaž Bedene and then Kyle Edmund in the quarter-finals in three sets. Murray reached the final after defeating Marin Čilić in the semi-finals, and won the title after coming from a set and a break down to defeat Milos Raonic for the third time in 2016. With this win Murray became the first person to win five titles at Queen's club.

==== Wimbledon Championships ====
After straight-sets victories over Liam Broady, Lu Yen-hsun, John Millman and Nick Kyrgios, Murray reached his ninth consecutive quarter-final at Wimbledon. He then defeated Jo-Wilfried Tsonga in five sets, having been two sets up, to reach the semi-final for the seventh time, where he won in straight sets against Tomáš Berdych, reaching his third Slam final of 2016 and eleventh overall, more than any other British male player. For the first time in a Slam final, Murray's opponent was neither Djokovic nor Federer but Milos Raonic, who had beaten Federer in the semi-finals, while Djokovic had lost earlier to Sam Querrey. Murray won the match in straight sets, winning his third Grand Slam title and second at Wimbledon.

=== Olympics and US Open ===
Murray chose not to play in the quarter-final of the Davis Cup World Group against Serbia, which the Great Britain team nevertheless won, and did not defend his title at the Canadian Open.

==== Rio Olympic Games ====
Murray recorded victories over Viktor Troicki, Juan Mónaco, Fabio Fognini, Steve Johnson and Kei Nishikori to reach his sixth consecutive final in all tournaments played. In the final he defeated Juan Martín del Potro in four sets to secure his second Gold Medal in Olympics singles tennis, becoming the first male to win two singles Gold Medals and to successfully defend an Olympic singles title.

==== Cincinnati Masters ====
At the Cincinnati Masters Murray continued his good form by beating Juan Mónaco, Kevin Anderson, and Bernard Tomic. He next faced Milos Raonic and won in straight sets to make it to the final for a third time, however lost to Marin Cilic. His loss to Cilic in the final was the first time since 2012 (l. Federer 2012 Wimbledon final) that someone other than Djokovic defeated him in a Tour final. Despite the loss, Murray recorded his best winning streak of his career, extending to 22 straight matches following his semifinal victory over Raonic.

==== US Open ====
Murray entered the US Open as second seed, with the chance to reach all four Slam finals in a year. Victories over Lukas Rosol, Marcel Granollers, Paolo Lorenzi (in four sets) and Grigor Dimitrov saw him reach the quarter-finals, where he faced Kei Nishikori. Despite winning the first set easily, and then leading two sets to one, Nishikori eventually prevailed in five sets.

==== Davis Cup Semi-finals ====
With Team GB victorious in the World Group quarter finals in the absence of Murray, he returned for the semi-final against Argentina. In the first rubber, Murray and del Potro contested a five-set match, with del Potro eventually emerging as the winner. Murray teamed up with his brother Jamie to win the doubles, keeping Team GB in the tie, and then beat Guido Pella in three sets to take the tie to 2–2. Dan Evans would lose the deciding rubber, and Great Britain were unable to defend their Davis Cup title.

=== Asian Swing and End of Season ===
==== China Open ====
Defending champion Novak Djokovic had withdrawn from the China Open, leaving Murray as the top seed. He went on to win the title for the first time, defeating Andreas Seppi, Andrey Kusnetsov, Kyle Edmund and David Ferrer on his way to the final, where he beat Grigor Dimitrov. Murray won each match in straight sets.

==== Shanghai Masters ====
Murray continued his strong form in Shanghai, winning the tournament for the third time in his career and without dropping a set. After defeating Steve Johnson, Lucas Pouille, David Goffin and Gilles Simon, he faced Roberto Bautista Agut, who had reached his first Masters final after beating the defending champion Djokovic in the semi-final. After coming through a tight first set, Murray won the second set for the loss of a single game. These back-to-back tournament victories, combined with Djokovic's own dip in form, meant that Murray was within a thousand points of Djokovic in the ATP race rankings.

==== Vienna Open ====
Murray brought his current win streak to 15 consecutive match wins by winning the Erste Bank Open for his 7th Tour title of the 2016 season. In his last 11 tournaments, Murray has reached the finals 10 times, including a career-best seven consecutive finals which ended with his quarter-final showing at the US Open. His tournament started slowly with 3-set wins over Martin Klizan and Gilles Simon in the first two rounds. However, a decisive win over John Isner in the quarter-finals and a walkover due to Ferrer's withdrawal with a leg injury saw Murray reach the final. There he defeated Jo-Wilfried Tsonga, for his third title in succession. The result saw Murray win seven titles in a single season for the first time in his career, and move to sole possession of 15th place on the all-time list of singles titles in the Open Era, breaking a tie with former world No. 1 Stefan Edberg. The win also took Murray over $10,000,000 prize money in a single season for the first time in his career.

==== Paris Masters ====
With Djokovic's loss in the quarter-finals, Murray could become World No. 1 for the first time if he reached the final. In his first match Murray edged a tight three-set match against Fernando Verdasco, facing two break points in his last service game before winning eight straight points to take the match. Murray then beat Lucas Pouille for the third time in 2016 in straight sets for the loss of only three games, and reached the semi-final after beating Tomas Berdych in straight sets, despite facing five set points in a row in the first-set tie break. A walkover into the final, courtesy of Milos Raonic withdrawing, confirmed Murray as the new world No. 1. This was Murray's fifth consecutive Masters 1000 final (he skipped Canada); prior to this, his personal best was 2 consecutive Masters 1000 finals. He then won the Paris Masters for the first time in his career, beating John Isner 6–3 6–7(4) 6–4 for his 19th consecutive match win. His Paris crown means that Murray has now won 7 of the 9 different Masters 1000 events and is only missing Indian Wells and Monte Carlo.

==== World Tour Finals ====
Murray was drawn in the same group as Marin Cilic, Kei Nishikori and Stan Wawrinka. He won all three of his group matches, including straight-sets wins over Cilic and Wawrinka, either side of a three-set match against Nishikori that set the record for longest match since the Tour Finals were hosted in London, at 3 hours 20 minutes. In the semi-final Murray defeated Milos Raonic for the sixth time in 2016, coming from a set down and breaking the record for longest match for the second time in a week at 3 hours 38 minutes.

In the final, Murray faced four-time defending champion Novak Djokovic. Murray won in straight sets. This saw Murray claim his first ATP World Tour Finals title, his ninth title of 2016, and ensured that he would hold the year-end No. 1 ranking for the first time. In his very first tournament as the world No. 1, arguably the most impressive facet of the event was defeating the world No. 7 Cilic, No. 5 Nishikori, No. 3 Wawrinka, No. 4 Raonic, and No. 2 Djokovic in five successive matches. The last time a player defeated 5 of the top-7 players was when Roger Federer defeated No. 7 Ferrer, No. 5 Murray, No. 4 Soderling, No. 3 Djokovic, and No. 1 Nadal in the 2010 event. It also meant that Murray would finish the season with his 24th consecutive match win.

== All matches ==
Key
W	F	SF	QF	#R	RR	Q#	P#	DNQ	A	Z#	PO	G	S	B	NMS	NTI	P	NH

(W) winner; (F) finalist; (SF) semifinalist; (QF) quarterfinalist; (#R) rounds 4, 3, 2, 1; (RR) round-robin stage; (Q#) qualification round; (P#) preliminary round; (DNQ) did not qualify; (A) absent; (Z#) Davis/Fed Cup Zonal Group (with number indication) or (PO) play-off; (G) gold, (S) silver or (B) bronze Olympic/Paralympic medal; (NMS) not a Masters tournament; (NTI) not a Tier I tournament; (P) postponed; (NH) not held; (SR) strike rate (events won / competed); (W–L) win–loss record.
To avoid confusion and double counting, these charts are updated at the conclusion of a tournament or when the player's participation has ended.

=== Singles ===
Tournament	Match	Round	Opponent (seed or key)	Rank	Result	Score
Australian Open; Melbourne, Australia; Grand Slam tournament Hard, outdoor 18 – 31 January 2016
Australian Open; Melbourne, Australia; Grand Slam tournament Hard, outdoor 18 – 31 January 2016	1 / 718	1R	(Germany) Alexander Zverev	83	Win	6–1, 6–2, 6–3
Australian Open; Melbourne, Australia; Grand Slam tournament Hard, outdoor 18 – 31 January 2016	2 / 719	2R	(Australia) Sam Groth	67	Win	6–0, 6–4, 6–1
Australian Open; Melbourne, Australia; Grand Slam tournament Hard, outdoor 18 – 31 January 2016	3 / 720	3R	(Portugal) João Sousa (32)	33	Win	6–2, 3–6, 6–2, 6–2
Australian Open; Melbourne, Australia; Grand Slam tournament Hard, outdoor 18 – 31 January 2016	4 / 721	4R	(Australia) Bernard Tomic (16)	17	Win	6–4, 6–4, 7–6^{(7–4)}
Australian Open; Melbourne, Australia; Grand Slam tournament Hard, outdoor 18 – 31 January 2016	5 / 722	QF	(Spain) David Ferrer (8)	8	Win	6–3, 6–7^{(5–7)}, 6–2, 6–3
Australian Open; Melbourne, Australia; Grand Slam tournament Hard, outdoor 18 – 31 January 2016	6 / 723	SF	(Canada) Milos Raonic (13)	14	Win	4–6, 7–5, 6–7^{(4–7)}, 6–4, 6–2
Australian Open; Melbourne, Australia; Grand Slam tournament Hard, outdoor 18 – 31 January 2016	7 / 724	F	(Serbia) Novak Djokovic (1)	1	Loss (1)	1–6, 5–7, 6–7^{(3–7)}
Davis Cup World Group First round Birmingham, United Kingdom; Davis Cup; Hard, indoor 4 – 6 March 2016
Davis Cup World Group First round Birmingham, United Kingdom; Davis Cup; Hard, indoor 4 – 6 March 2016	8 / 725	1R; R1	(Japan) Taro Daniel	87	Win	6–1, 6–3, 6–1
Davis Cup World Group First round Birmingham, United Kingdom; Davis Cup; Hard, indoor 4 – 6 March 2016	9 / 726	1R; R4	(Japan) Kei Nishikori	6	Win	7–5, 7–6^{(8–6)}, 3–6, 4–6, 6–3
Indian Wells Masters; Indian Wells, United States; ATP 1000; Hard, outdoor 7 – 20 March 2016
Indian Wells Masters; Indian Wells, United States; ATP 1000; Hard, outdoor 7 – 20 March 2016	–	1R	Bye			
Indian Wells Masters; Indian Wells, United States; ATP 1000; Hard, outdoor 7 – 20 March 2016	10 / 727	2R	(Spain) Marcel Granollers	92	Win	6–4, 7–6^{(7–3)}
Indian Wells Masters; Indian Wells, United States; ATP 1000; Hard, outdoor 7 – 20 March 2016	11 / 728	3R	(Argentina) Federico Delbonis	53	Loss	4–6, 6–4, 6–7^{(3–7)}
Miami Open; Miami, United States; ATP 1000; Hard, outdoor 23 March – 3 April 2016
Miami Open; Miami, United States; ATP 1000; Hard, outdoor 23 March – 3 April 2016	–	1R	Bye			
Miami Open; Miami, United States; ATP 1000; Hard, outdoor 23 March – 3 April 2016	12 / 729	2R	(Uzbekistan) Denis Istomin	76	Win	6–3, 7–5
Miami Open; Miami, United States; ATP 1000; Hard, outdoor 23 March – 3 April 2016	13 / 730	3R	(Bulgaria) Grigor Dimitrov (26)	28	Loss	7–6^{(7–1)}, 4–6, 3–6
Monte-Carlo Masters; Monte-Carlo, Monaco; ATP 1000; Clay, outdoor 11 – 17 April 2016
Monte-Carlo Masters; Monte-Carlo, Monaco; ATP 1000; Clay, outdoor 11 – 17 April 2016	–	1R	Bye			
Monte-Carlo Masters; Monte-Carlo, Monaco; ATP 1000; Clay, outdoor 11 – 17 April 2016	14 / 731	2R	(France) Pierre-Hugues Herbert (Q)	95	Win	6–2, 4–6, 6–3
Monte-Carlo Masters; Monte-Carlo, Monaco; ATP 1000; Clay, outdoor 11 – 17 April 2016	15 / 732	3R	(France) Benoît Paire (16)	22	Win	2–6, 7–5, 7–5
Monte-Carlo Masters; Monte-Carlo, Monaco; ATP 1000; Clay, outdoor 11 – 17 April 2016	16 / 733	QF	(Canada) Milos Raonic (10)	12	Win	6–2, 6–0
Monte-Carlo Masters; Monte-Carlo, Monaco; ATP 1000; Clay, outdoor 11 – 17 April 2016	17 / 734	SF	(Spain) Rafael Nadal (5)	5	Loss	6–2, 4–6, 2–6
Madrid Open; Madrid, Spain; ATP 1000; Clay, outdoor 1 – 8 May 2016
Madrid Open; Madrid, Spain; ATP 1000; Clay, outdoor 1 – 8 May 2016	–	1R	Bye			
Madrid Open; Madrid, Spain; ATP 1000; Clay, outdoor 1 – 8 May 2016	18 / 735	2R	(Czech Republic) Radek Štěpánek (Q)	148	Win	7–6^{(7–3)}, 3–6, 6–1
Madrid Open; Madrid, Spain; ATP 1000; Clay, outdoor 1 – 8 May 2016	19 / 736	3R	(France) Gilles Simon (16)	18	Win	6–4, 6–2
Madrid Open; Madrid, Spain; ATP 1000; Clay, outdoor 1 – 8 May 2016	20 / 737	QF	(Czech Republic) Tomáš Berdych (8)	8	Win	6–3, 6–2
Madrid Open; Madrid, Spain; ATP 1000; Clay, outdoor 1 – 8 May 2016	21 / 738	SF	(Spain) Rafael Nadal (5)	5	Win	7–5, 6–4
Madrid Open; Madrid, Spain; ATP 1000; Clay, outdoor 1 – 8 May 2016	22 / 739	F	(Serbia) Novak Djokovic (1)	1	Loss (2)	2–6, 6–3, 3–6
Italian Open; Rome, Italy; ATP 1000; Clay, outdoor 9 – 15 May 2016
Italian Open; Rome, Italy; ATP 1000; Clay, outdoor 9 – 15 May 2016	–	1R	Bye			
Italian Open; Rome, Italy; ATP 1000; Clay, outdoor 9 – 15 May 2016	23 / 740	2R	(Kazakhstan) Mikhail Kukushkin (Q)	87	Win	6–3, 6–3
Italian Open; Rome, Italy; ATP 1000; Clay, outdoor 9 – 15 May 2016	24 / 741	3R	(France) Jérémy Chardy	32	Win	6–4, 6–0
Italian Open; Rome, Italy; ATP 1000; Clay, outdoor 9 – 15 May 2016	25 / 742	QF	(Belgium) David Goffin (12)	13	Win	6–1, 7–5
Italian Open; Rome, Italy; ATP 1000; Clay, outdoor 9 – 15 May 2016	26 / 743	SF	(France) Lucas Pouille (LL)	52	Win	6–2, 6–1
Italian Open; Rome, Italy; ATP 1000; Clay, outdoor 9 – 15 May 2016	27 / 744	W	(Serbia) Novak Djokovic (1)	1	Win (1)	6–3, 6–3
French Open; Paris, France; Grand Slam tournament Clay, outdoor 22 May – 5 June 2016
French Open; Paris, France; Grand Slam tournament Clay, outdoor 22 May – 5 June 2016	28 / 745	1R	(Czech Republic) Radek Štěpánek (Q)	128	Win	3–6, 3–6, 6–0, 6–3, 7–5
French Open; Paris, France; Grand Slam tournament Clay, outdoor 22 May – 5 June 2016	29 / 746	2R	(France) Mathias Bourgue (WC)	164	Win	6–2, 2–6, 4–6, 6–2, 6–3
French Open; Paris, France; Grand Slam tournament Clay, outdoor 22 May – 5 June 2016	30 / 747	3R	(Croatia) Ivo Karlović (27)	28	Win	6–1, 6–4, 7–6^{(7–3)}
French Open; Paris, France; Grand Slam tournament Clay, outdoor 22 May – 5 June 2016	31 / 748	4R	(United States) John Isner (15)	17	Win	7–6^{(11–9)}, 6–4, 6–3
French Open; Paris, France; Grand Slam tournament Clay, outdoor 22 May – 5 June 2016	32 / 749	QF	(France) Richard Gasquet (9)	12	Win	5–7, 7–6^{(7–3)}, 6–0, 6–2
French Open; Paris, France; Grand Slam tournament Clay, outdoor 22 May – 5 June 2016	33 / 750	SF	(Switzerland) Stan Wawrinka (3)	4	Win	6–4, 6–2, 4–6, 6–2
French Open; Paris, France; Grand Slam tournament Clay, outdoor 22 May – 5 June 2016	34 / 751	F	(Serbia) Novak Djokovic (1)	1	Loss (3)	6–3, 1–6, 2–6, 4–6
Queen's Club Championships; London, United Kingdom; ATP 500; Grass, outdoor 13 – 19 June 2016
Queen's Club Championships; London, United Kingdom; ATP 500; Grass, outdoor 13 – 19 June 2016	35 / 752	1R	(France) Nicolas Mahut	51	Win	7–6^{(10–8)}, 7–6^{(7–1)}
Queen's Club Championships; London, United Kingdom; ATP 500; Grass, outdoor 13 – 19 June 2016	36 / 753	2R	(United Kingdom) Aljaž Bedene	58	Win	6–3, 6–4
Queen's Club Championships; London, United Kingdom; ATP 500; Grass, outdoor 13 – 19 June 2016	37 / 754	QF	(United Kingdom) Kyle Edmund (WC)	85	Win	6–4, 3–6, 6–1
Queen's Club Championships; London, United Kingdom; ATP 500; Grass, outdoor 13 – 19 June 2016	38 / 755	SF	(Croatia) Marin Čilić (5)	13	Win	6–3, 4–6, 6–3
Queen's Club Championships; London, United Kingdom; ATP 500; Grass, outdoor 13 – 19 June 2016	39 / 756	W	(Canada) Milos Raonic (3)	9	Win (2)	6–7^{(5–7)}, 6–4, 6–3
Wimbledon Championships; London, United Kingdom; Grand Slam tournament Grass, outdoor 27 June – 10 July 2016
Wimbledon Championships; London, United Kingdom; Grand Slam tournament Grass, outdoor 27 June – 10 July 2016	40 / 757	1R	(United Kingdom) Liam Broady (WC)	235	Win	6–2, 6–3, 6–4
Wimbledon Championships; London, United Kingdom; Grand Slam tournament Grass, outdoor 27 June – 10 July 2016	41 / 758	2R	(Chinese Taipei) Lu Yen-hsun (PR)	76	Win	6–3, 6–2, 6–1
Wimbledon Championships; London, United Kingdom; Grand Slam tournament Grass, outdoor 27 June – 10 July 2016	42 / 759	3R	(Australia) John Millman	67	Win	6–3, 7–5, 6–2
Wimbledon Championships; London, United Kingdom; Grand Slam tournament Grass, outdoor 27 June – 10 July 2016	43 / 760	4R	(Australia) Nick Kyrgios (15)	18	Win	7–5, 6–1, 6–4
Wimbledon Championships; London, United Kingdom; Grand Slam tournament Grass, outdoor 27 June – 10 July 2016	44 / 761	QF	(France) Jo-Wilfried Tsonga (12)	12	Win	7–6^{(12–10)}, 6–1, 3–6, 4–6, 6–1
Wimbledon Championships; London, United Kingdom; Grand Slam tournament Grass, outdoor 27 June – 10 July 2016	45 / 762	SF	(Czech Republic) Tomáš Berdych (10)	9	Win	6–3, 6–3, 6–3
Wimbledon Championships; London, United Kingdom; Grand Slam tournament Grass, outdoor 27 June – 10 July 2016	46 / 763	W	(Canada) Milos Raonic (6)	7	Win (3)	6–4, 7–6^{(7–3)}, 7–6^{(7–2)}
Summer Olympic Games; Rio de Janeiro, Brazil; Olympics; Hard, outdoor 6 – 14 August 2016
Summer Olympic Games; Rio de Janeiro, Brazil; Olympics; Hard, outdoor 6 – 14 August 2016	47 / 764	1R	(Serbia) Viktor Troicki	35	Win	6–3, 6–2
Summer Olympic Games; Rio de Janeiro, Brazil; Olympics; Hard, outdoor 6 – 14 August 2016	48 / 765	2R	(Argentina) Juan Mónaco	107	Win	6–3, 6–1
Summer Olympic Games; Rio de Janeiro, Brazil; Olympics; Hard, outdoor 6 – 14 August 2016	49 / 766	3R	(Italy) Fabio Fognini	40	Win	6–1, 2–6, 6–3
Summer Olympic Games; Rio de Janeiro, Brazil; Olympics; Hard, outdoor 6 – 14 August 2016	50 / 767	QF	(United States) Steve Johnson (12)	22	Win	6–0, 4–6, 7–6^{(7–2)}
Summer Olympic Games; Rio de Janeiro, Brazil; Olympics; Hard, outdoor 6 – 14 August 2016	51 / 768	SF	(Japan) Kei Nishikori (4)	7	Win	6–1, 6–4
Summer Olympic Games; Rio de Janeiro, Brazil; Olympics; Hard, outdoor 6 – 14 August 2016	52 / 769	G	(Argentina) Juan Martín del Potro (PR)	141	Win (4)	7–5, 4–6, 6–2, 7–5
Cincinnati Masters; Cincinnati, United States; ATP 1000; Hard, outdoor 13 – 21 August 2016
Cincinnati Masters; Cincinnati, United States; ATP 1000; Hard, outdoor 13 – 21 August 2016	–	1R	Bye			
Cincinnati Masters; Cincinnati, United States; ATP 1000; Hard, outdoor 13 – 21 August 2016	53 / 770	2R	(Argentina) Juan Mónaco (PR)	104	Win	6–3, 6–2
Cincinnati Masters; Cincinnati, United States; ATP 1000; Hard, outdoor 13 – 21 August 2016	54 / 771	3R	(South Africa) Kevin Anderson	24	Win	6–3, 6–2
Cincinnati Masters; Cincinnati, United States; ATP 1000; Hard, outdoor 13 – 21 August 2016	55 / 772	QF	(Australia) Bernard Tomic	21	Win	6–4, 6–4
Cincinnati Masters; Cincinnati, United States; ATP 1000; Hard, outdoor 13 – 21 August 2016	56 / 773	SF	(Canada) Milos Raonic (4)	6	Win	6–3, 6–3
Cincinnati Masters; Cincinnati, United States; ATP 1000; Hard, outdoor 13 – 21 August 2016	57 / 774	F	(Croatia) Marin Čilić (12)	14	Loss (4)	4–6, 5–7
US Open; New York City, United States; Grand Slam tournament Hard, outdoor 29 August – 11 September 2016
US Open; New York City, United States; Grand Slam tournament Hard, outdoor 29 August – 11 September 2016	58 / 775	1R	(Czech Republic) Lukáš Rosol	81	Win	6–3, 6–2, 6–2
US Open; New York City, United States; Grand Slam tournament Hard, outdoor 29 August – 11 September 2016	59 / 776	2R	(Spain) Marcel Granollers	45	Win	6–4, 6–1, 6–4
US Open; New York City, United States; Grand Slam tournament Hard, outdoor 29 August – 11 September 2016	60 / 777	3R	(Italy) Paolo Lorenzi	40	Win	7–6^{(7–4)}, 5–7, 6–2, 6–3
US Open; New York City, United States; Grand Slam tournament Hard, outdoor 29 August – 11 September 2016	61 / 778	4R	(Bulgaria) Grigor Dimitrov (22)	24	Win	6–1, 6–2, 6–2
US Open; New York City, United States; Grand Slam tournament Hard, outdoor 29 August – 11 September 2016	62 / 779	QF	(Japan) Kei Nishikori (6)	7	Loss	6–1, 4–6, 6–4, 1–6, 5–7
Davis Cup World Group Semi-final; Glasgow, United Kingdom; Davis Cup; Hard, indoor 16 – 18 September 2016
Davis Cup World Group Semi-final; Glasgow, United Kingdom; Davis Cup; Hard, indoor 16 – 18 September 2016	63 / 780	SF; R1	(Argentina) Juan Martín del Potro	64	Loss	4–6, 7–5, 7–6^{(7–5)}, 3–6, 4–6
Davis Cup World Group Semi-final; Glasgow, United Kingdom; Davis Cup; Hard, indoor 16 – 18 September 2016	64 / 781	SF; R4	(Argentina) Guido Pella	49	Win	6–3, 6–2, 6–3
China Open; Beijing, China; ATP 500; Hard, outdoor 3 – 9 October 2016
China Open; Beijing, China; ATP 500; Hard, outdoor 3 – 9 October 2016	65 / 782	1R	(Italy) Andreas Seppi	94	Win	6–2, 7–5
China Open; Beijing, China; ATP 500; Hard, outdoor 3 – 9 October 2016	66 / 783	2R	(Russia) Andrey Kuznetsov	45	Win	6–2, 6–1
China Open; Beijing, China; ATP 500; Hard, outdoor 3 – 9 October 2016	67 / 784	QF	(United Kingdom) Kyle Edmund (Q)	54	Win	7–6^{(11–9)}, 6–2
China Open; Beijing, China; ATP 500; Hard, outdoor 3 – 9 October 2016	68 / 785	SF	(Spain) David Ferrer (5)	13	Win	6–2, 6–3
China Open; Beijing, China; ATP 500; Hard, outdoor 3 – 9 October 2016	69 / 786	W	(Bulgaria) Grigor Dimitrov	20	Win (5)	6–4, 7–6^{(7–2)}
Shanghai Masters; Shanghai, China; ATP 1000; Hard, outdoor 9 – 16 October 2016
Shanghai Masters; Shanghai, China; ATP 1000; Hard, outdoor 9 – 16 October 2016	–	1R	Bye			
Shanghai Masters; Shanghai, China; ATP 1000; Hard, outdoor 9 – 16 October 2016	70 / 787	2R	(United States) Steve Johnson	24	Win	6–3, 6–2
Shanghai Masters; Shanghai, China; ATP 1000; Hard, outdoor 9 – 16 October 2016	71 / 788	3R	(France) Lucas Pouille (13)	16	Win	6–1, 6–3
Shanghai Masters; Shanghai, China; ATP 1000; Hard, outdoor 9 – 16 October 2016	72 / 789	QF	(Belgium) David Goffin (11)	12	Win	6–2, 6–2
Shanghai Masters; Shanghai, China; ATP 1000; Hard, outdoor 9 – 16 October 2016	73 / 790	SF	(France) Gilles Simon	32	Win	6–4, 6–3
Shanghai Masters; Shanghai, China; ATP 1000; Hard, outdoor 9 – 16 October 2016	74 / 791	W	(Spain) Roberto Bautista Agut (15)	19	Win (6)	7–6^{(7–1)}, 6–1
Vienna Open; Vienna, Austria; ATP 500; Hard, indoor 24 – 30 October 2016
Vienna Open; Vienna, Austria; ATP 500; Hard, indoor 24 – 30 October 2016	75 / 792	1R	(Slovakia) Martin Kližan	35	Win	6–3, 6–7^{(5–7)}, 6–0
Vienna Open; Vienna, Austria; ATP 500; Hard, indoor 24 – 30 October 2016	76 / 793	2R	(France) Gilles Simon	24	Win	4–6, 6–2, 6–2
Vienna Open; Vienna, Austria; ATP 500; Hard, indoor 24 – 30 October 2016	77 / 794	QF	(United States) John Isner	27	Win	6–1, 6–3
Vienna Open; Vienna, Austria; ATP 500; Hard, indoor 24 – 30 October 2016	–	SF	(Spain) David Ferrer (5)	19	Walkover	N/A
Vienna Open; Vienna, Austria; ATP 500; Hard, indoor 24 – 30 October 2016	78 / 795	W	(France) Jo-Wilfried Tsonga (6)	15	Win (7)	6–3, 7–6^{(8–6)}
Paris Masters; Paris, France; ATP 1000; Hard, indoor 31 October – 6 November 2016
Paris Masters; Paris, France; ATP 1000; Hard, indoor 31 October – 6 November 2016	–	1R	Bye			
Paris Masters; Paris, France; ATP 1000; Hard, indoor 31 October – 6 November 2016	79 / 796	2R	(Spain) Fernando Verdasco	46	Win	6–3, 6–7^{(5–7)}, 7–5
Paris Masters; Paris, France; ATP 1000; Hard, indoor 31 October – 6 November 2016	80 / 797	3R	(France) Lucas Pouille (13)	17	Win	6–3, 6–0
Paris Masters; Paris, France; ATP 1000; Hard, indoor 31 October – 6 November 2016	81 / 798	QF	(Czech Republic) Tomáš Berdych (7)	11	Win	7–6^{(11–9)}, 7–5
Paris Masters; Paris, France; ATP 1000; Hard, indoor 31 October – 6 November 2016	–	SF	(Canada) Milos Raonic (4)	5	Walkover	N/A
Paris Masters; Paris, France; ATP 1000; Hard, indoor 31 October – 6 November 2016	82 / 799	W	(United States) John Isner	27	Win (8)	6–3, 6–7^{(4–7)}, 6–4
ATP World Tour Finals; London, United Kingdom; ATP Finals; Hard, indoor 13 – 20 November 2016
ATP World Tour Finals; London, United Kingdom; ATP Finals; Hard, indoor 13 – 20 November 2016	83 / 800	RR	(Croatia) Marin Čilić (7)	7	Win	6–3, 6–2
ATP World Tour Finals; London, United Kingdom; ATP Finals; Hard, indoor 13 – 20 November 2016	84 / 801	RR	(Japan) Kei Nishikori (5)	5	Win	6–7^{(9–11)}, 6–4, 6–4
ATP World Tour Finals; London, United Kingdom; ATP Finals; Hard, indoor 13 – 20 November 2016	85 / 802	RR	(Switzerland) Stan Wawrinka (3)	3	Win	6–4, 6–2
ATP World Tour Finals; London, United Kingdom; ATP Finals; Hard, indoor 13 – 20 November 2016	86 / 803	SF	(Canada) Milos Raonic (4)	4	Win	5–7, 7–6^{(7–5)}, 7–6^{(11–9)}
ATP World Tour Finals; London, United Kingdom; ATP Finals; Hard, indoor 13 – 20 November 2016	87 / 804	W	(Serbia) Novak Djokovic (2)	2	Win (9)	6–3, 6–4

=== Doubles ===
Tournament	Match	Round	Opponent (seed or key)	Rank	Result	Score
Davis Cup World Group First round Birmingham, United Kingdom; Davis Cup; Hard, indoor 4 – 6 March 2016; Partner: (United Kingdom) Jamie Murray
Davis Cup World Group First round Birmingham, United Kingdom; Davis Cup; Hard, indoor 4 – 6 March 2016; Partner: (United Kingdom) Jamie Murray	1 / 127	1R; R3	(Japan) Nishioka / (Japan) Uchiyama	426 / 317	Win	6–3, 6–2, 6–4
Indian Wells Masters; Indian Wells, United States; ATP 1000; Hard, outdoor 7 – 20 March 2016; Partner: (United Kingdom) Colin Fleming
Indian Wells Masters; Indian Wells, United States; ATP 1000; Hard, outdoor 7 – 20 March 2016; Partner: (United Kingdom) Colin Fleming	2 / 128	1R	(United States) Isner / (Canada) Raonic	120 / –	Loss	5–7, 7–6^{(7–5)}, [8–10]
Monte-Carlo Masters; Monte-Carlo, Monaco; ATP 1000; Clay, outdoor 11 – 17 April 2016; Partner: (United Kingdom) Dominic Inglot
Monte-Carlo Masters; Monte-Carlo, Monaco; ATP 1000; Clay, outdoor 11 – 17 April 2016; Partner: (United Kingdom) Dominic Inglot	3 / 129	1R	(Uruguay) Cuevas / (Spain) Granollers	34 / 33	Win	6–3, 6–4
Monte-Carlo Masters; Monte-Carlo, Monaco; ATP 1000; Clay, outdoor 11 – 17 April 2016; Partner: (United Kingdom) Dominic Inglot	4 / 130	2R	(France) Roger-Vasselin / (Serbia) Zimonjić (7)	15 / 18	Win	2–6, 6–3, [10–5]
Monte-Carlo Masters; Monte-Carlo, Monaco; ATP 1000; Clay, outdoor 11 – 17 April 2016; Partner: (United Kingdom) Dominic Inglot	5 / 131	QF	(France) Herbert / (France) Mahut (3)	8 / 5	Loss	4–6, 6–3, [10–12]
Summer Olympic Games; Rio de Janeiro, Brazil; Olympics; Hard, outdoor 6 – 14 August 2016; Partner: (United Kingdom) Jamie Murray
Summer Olympic Games; Rio de Janeiro, Brazil; Olympics; Hard, outdoor 6 – 14 August 2016; Partner: (United Kingdom) Jamie Murray	6 / 132	1R	(Brazil) Bellucci / (Brazil) Sá (IP)	103 / 63	Loss	6–7^{(6–8)}, 6–7^{(14–16)}
Davis Cup World Group Semi-final; Glasgow, United Kingdom; Davis Cup; Hard, indoor 16 – 18 September 2016; Partner: (United Kingdom) Jamie Murray
Davis Cup World Group Semi-final; Glasgow, United Kingdom; Davis Cup; Hard, indoor 16 – 18 September 2016; Partner: (United Kingdom) Jamie Murray	7 / 133	SF; R3	(Argentina) del Potro / (Argentina) Mayer	353 / 122	Win	6–1, 3–6, 6–4, 6–4

=== Mixed doubles ===
Tournament	Match	Round	Opponent (seed or key)	Rank	Result	Score
Summer Olympic Games; Rio de Janeiro, Brazil; Olympics; Hard, outdoor 6 – 14 August 2016; Partner: (United Kingdom) Heather Watson
Summer Olympic Games; Rio de Janeiro, Brazil; Olympics; Hard, outdoor 6 – 14 August 2016; Partner: (United Kingdom) Heather Watson	1 / 12	1R	(Spain) Suárez Navarro / (Spain) Ferrer	12 / 12	Win	6–3, 6–3
Summer Olympic Games; Rio de Janeiro, Brazil; Olympics; Hard, outdoor 6 – 14 August 2016; Partner: (United Kingdom) Heather Watson	2 / 13	QF	(India) Mirza / (India) Bopanna	1 / 15	Loss	4–6, 4–6

=== Exhibitions ===
Tournament	Match	Round	Opponents (Seed or Key)	Rank	Result	Score
Hopman Cup; Perth, Western Australia, Australia; Mixed exhibition Hard, indoor 3 – 9 January 2016; Partner: (United Kingdom) Heather Watson
Hopman Cup; Perth, Western Australia, Australia; Mixed exhibition Hard, indoor 3 – 9 January 2016; Partner: (United Kingdom) Heather Watson	–	RR	(France) Kenny de Schepper	148	Win	6–2, 6–2
Hopman Cup; Perth, Western Australia, Australia; Mixed exhibition Hard, indoor 3 – 9 January 2016; Partner: (United Kingdom) Heather Watson	–	RR	(France) Caroline Garcia / (France) Kenny de Schepper	–	Win	6–2, 5–7, [10–6]
Hopman Cup; Perth, Western Australia, Australia; Mixed exhibition Hard, indoor 3 – 9 January 2016; Partner: (United Kingdom) Heather Watson	–	RR	(Australia) Nick Kyrgios	30	Loss	4–6, 6–7^{(5–7)}
Hopman Cup; Perth, Western Australia, Australia; Mixed exhibition Hard, indoor 3 – 9 January 2016; Partner: (United Kingdom) Heather Watson	–	RR	(Australia) Daria Gavrilova / (Australia) Nick Kyrgios	–	Loss	2–6, 7–6^{(7–0)}, [9–11]
Hopman Cup; Perth, Western Australia, Australia; Mixed exhibition Hard, indoor 3 – 9 January 2016; Partner: (United Kingdom) Heather Watson	–	RR	(Germany) Alexander Zverev	83	Win	6–3, 6–4
Hopman Cup; Perth, Western Australia, Australia; Mixed exhibition Hard, indoor 3 – 9 January 2016; Partner: (United Kingdom) Heather Watson	–	RR	(Germany) Sabine Lisicki / (Germany) Alexander Zverev	–	Win	6–3, 6–4
Tie Break Tens; Vienna, Austria; Singles exhibition Hard, indoor 23 October 2016
Tie Break Tens; Vienna, Austria; Singles exhibition Hard, indoor 23 October 2016	–	RR	(Croatia) Goran Ivanišević	–	Win	[10–7]
Tie Break Tens; Vienna, Austria; Singles exhibition Hard, indoor 23 October 2016	–	RR	(United Kingdom) Marcus Willis	498	Win	[10–3]
Tie Break Tens; Vienna, Austria; Singles exhibition Hard, indoor 23 October 2016	–	SF	(France) Jo-Wilfried Tsonga	16	Win	[10–7]
Tie Break Tens; Vienna, Austria; Singles exhibition Hard, indoor 23 October 2016	–	F	(Austria) Dominic Thiem	10	Loss	[5–10]

== Tournament schedule ==
=== Singles schedule ===
Date	Tournament	City	Category	Surface	2015 result	2015 points	2016 points	Outcome
18.01–31.01	Australian Open	Melbourne	Grand Slam	Hard	F	1,200	1,200	Lost in the final against Novak Djokovic
04.03–06.03	Davis Cup: Great Britain vs Japan; World Group First round	Birmingham	Davis Cup	Hard (i)	W	80	— (Note: The Davis Cup in 2016 no longer carried ranking points.)	Great Britain def. Japan, 3–1; Great Britain advanced to WG QF
07.03–20.03	Indian Wells Masters	Indian Wells	ATP World Tour Masters 1000	Hard	SF	360	45	Lost in third round against Federico Delbonis
23.03–03.04	Miami Masters	Miami	ATP World Tour Masters 1000	Hard	F	600	45	Lost in third round against Grigor Dimitrov
11.04–17.04	Monte-Carlo Masters	Monte-Carlo	ATP World Tour Masters 1000	Clay	DNS	0	360	Lost in the semifinals against Rafael Nadal
01.05–08.05	Madrid Open	Madrid	ATP World Tour Masters 1000	Clay	W	1,000	600	Lost in the final against Novak Djokovic
09.05–15.05	Italian Open	Rome	ATP World Tour Masters 1000	Clay	3R	90	1,000	Won in the final against Novak Djokovic
22.05–05.06	French Open	Paris	Grand Slam	Clay	SF	720	1,200	Lost in the final against Novak Djokovic
13.06–19.06	Queen's Club Championships	London	ATP World Tour 500	Grass	W	500	500	Won in the final against Milos Raonic
27.06–10.07	Wimbledon Championships	London	Grand Slam	Grass	SF	720	2,000	Won in the final against Milos Raonic
08.08–14.08	Summer Olympic Games	Rio de Janeiro	Olympics	Hard	—	—	— (Note: The tournament at the Olympic Games carried no ranking points.)	Won in the final against Juan Martín del Potro
13.08–21.08	Cincinnati Masters	Cincinnati	ATP World Tour Masters 1000	Hard	SF	360	600	Lost in the final against Marin Čilić
29.08–11.09	US Open	New York	Grand Slam	Hard	4R	180	360	Lost in the quarterfinals against Kei Nishikori
16.09–18.09	Davis Cup: Great Britain vs Argentina; World Group Semifinals	Glasgow	Davis Cup	Hard (i)	W	140	—	Argentina def. Great Britain, 3–2; Great Britain eliminated in WG SF
03.10–09.10	China Open	Beijing	ATP World Tour 500	Hard	DNS	0	500	Won in the final against Grigor Dimitrov
09.10–16.10	Shanghai Masters	Shanghai	ATP World Tour Masters 1000	Hard	SF	360	1,000	Won in the final against Roberto Bautista Agut
24.10–30.10	Vienna Open	Vienna	ATP World Tour 500	Hard (i)	DNS	0	500	Won in the final against Jo-Wilfried Tsonga
31.10–06.11	Paris Masters	Paris	ATP World Tour Masters 1000	Hard (i)	F	600	1,000	Won in the final against John Isner
13.11–20.11	ATP World Tour Finals	London	ATP World Tour Finals	Hard (i)	RR	200	1,500	Won in the final against Novak Djokovic
Race to London points						7110	12410	▲5300 difference
Total year-end points						7110	12410	

== Yearly records ==
=== Head-to-head matchups ===
(Bold denotes a top 10 player at the time of the most recent match between the two players, Italic denotes top 50.)

- (Canada) **Milos Raonic** 6–0 (Note: Raonic was ranked outside the top 10 but inside the top 50 for their first two meetings (2–0) and inside the top 10 for their following meetings (4–0).)
- (France) Gilles Simon 3–0
- (France) Lucas Pouille 3–0 (Note: Pouille was ranked outside the top 50 for their first meeting (1–0) and inside the top 50 but outside the top 10 for their following meetings (2–0).)
- (Czech Republic) **Tomáš Berdych** 3–0 (Note: Berdych was ranked inside the top 10 for their first two meetings (2–0) and inside the top 50 but outside the top 10 for their following meeting (1–0).)
- (United States) John Isner 3–0
- (Japan) **Kei Nishikori** 3–1
- (Czech Republic) Radek Štěpánek 2–0
- (Argentina) Juan Mónaco 2–0
- (Australia) Bernard Tomic 2–0
- (Spain) Marcel Granollers 2–0 (Note: Granollers was ranked outside the top 50 for their first meeting (1–0) and inside the top 50 but outside the top 10 for their following meeting (1–0).)
- (United Kingdom) Kyle Edmund 2–0
- (Spain) **David Ferrer** 2–0 (Note: Ferrer was ranked inside the top 10 for their first meeting (1–0) and inside the top 50 but outside the top 10 for their following meeting (1–0).)
- (United States) Steve Johnson 2–0
- (Belgium) David Goffin 2–0
- (France) Jo-Wilfried Tsonga 2–0
- (Switzerland) **Stan Wawrinka** 2–0
- (Bulgaria) Grigor Dimitrov 2–1
- (Croatia) **Marin Čilić** 2–1 (Note: Čilić was ranked outside the top 10 but inside the top 50 for their first two meetings (1–1) and inside the top 10 for their following meeting (1–0).)
- (Serbia) **Novak Djokovic** 2–3
- (Germany) Alexander Zverev 1–0
- (Australia) Sam Groth 1–0
- (Portugal) João Sousa 1–0
- (Japan) Taro Daniel 1–0
- (Uzbekistan) Denis Istomin 1–0
- (France) Pierre-Hugues Herbert 1–0
- (France) Benoît Paire 1–0
- (Kazakhstan) Mikhail Kukushkin 1–0
- (France) Jérémy Chardy 1–0
- (France) Mathias Bourgue 1–0
- (Croatia) Ivo Karlović 1–0
- (France) Richard Gasquet 1–0
- (France) Nicolas Mahut 1–0
- (United Kingdom) Aljaž Bedene 1–0
- (United Kingdom) Liam Broady 1–0
- (Chinese Taipei) Lu Yen-hsun 1–0
- (Australia) John Millman 1–0
- (Australia) Nick Kyrgios 1–0
- (Serbia) Viktor Troicki 1–0
- (Italy) Fabio Fognini 1–0
- (South Africa) Kevin Anderson 1–0
- (Czech Republic) Lukáš Rosol 1–0
- (Italy) Paolo Lorenzi 1–0
- (Argentina) Guido Pella 1–0
- (Italy) Andreas Seppi 1–0
- (Russia) Andrey Kuznetsov 1–0
- (Spain) Roberto Bautista Agut 1–0
- (Slovakia) Martin Kližan 1–0
- (Spain) Fernando Verdasco 1–0
- (Spain) **Rafael Nadal** 1–1
- (Argentina) Juan Martín del Potro 1–1
- (Argentina) Federico Delbonis 0–1

=== Finals ===
==== Singles: 13 (9–4) ====
Category Grand Slam (1–2) ATP World Tour Finals (1–0) Olympic Games (1–0) ATP World Tour Masters 1000 (3–2) ATP World Tour 500 (3–0) ATP World Tour 250 (0–0)	Titles by surface Hard (6–2) Clay (1–2) Grass (2–0)	Titles by conditions Outdoors (6–4) Indoors (3–0)

Outcome	Date	Tournament	Surface	Opponent in the final	Score in the final
Runner-up	31 January 2016	Australian Open, Melbourne, Australia	Hard	(Serbia) Novak Djokovic	1–6, 5–7, 6–7^{(3–7)}
Runner-up	8 May 2016	Madrid Open, Madrid, Spain	Clay	(Serbia) Novak Djokovic	2–6, 6–3, 3–6
Winner	15 May 2016	Italian Open, Rome, Italy	Clay	(Serbia) Novak Djokovic	6–3, 6–3
Runner-up	5 June 2016	French Open, Paris, France	Clay	(Serbia) Novak Djokovic	6–3, 1–6, 2–6, 4–6
Winner	19 June 2016	Queen's Club Championships, London, United Kingdom	Grass	(Canada) Milos Raonic	6–7^{(5–7)}, 6–4, 6–3
Winner	10 July 2016	Wimbledon Championships, London, United Kingdom	Grass	(Canada) Milos Raonic	6–4, 7–6^{(7–3)}, 7–6^{(7–2)}
Winner	14 August 2016	Summer Olympics, Rio de Janeiro, Brazil	Hard	(Argentina) Juan Martín del Potro	7–5, 4–6, 6–2, 7–5
Runner-up	21 August 2016	Cincinnati Masters, Cincinnati, United States	Hard	(Croatia) Marin Čilić	4–6, 5–7
Winner	9 October 2016	China Open, Beijing, China	Hard	(Bulgaria) Grigor Dimitrov	6–4, 7–6^{(7–2)}
Winner	16 October 2016	Shanghai Masters, Shanghai, China	Hard	(Spain) Roberto Bautista Agut	7–6^{(7–1)}, 6–1
Winner	30 October 2016	Vienna Open, Vienna, Austria	Hard (i)	(France) Jo-Wilfried Tsonga	6–3, 7–6^{(8–6)}
Winner	6 November 2016	Paris Masters, Paris, France	Hard (i)	(United States) John Isner	6–3, 6–7^{(4–7)}, 6–4
Winner	20 November 2016	ATP World Tour Finals, London, United Kingdom	Hard (i)	(Serbia) Novak Djokovic	6–3, 6–4

=== Earnings ===
**Singles**
Event	Prize money	Year-to-date
Australian Open	A$1,700,000	$1,166,030
Indian Wells Masters	$36,170	$1,202,200
Miami Open	$36,170	$1,238,370
Monte-Carlo Masters	€177,015	$1,440,043
Madrid Open	€447,630	$1,952,311
**Italian Open**	€717,315	$2,770,265
French Open	€1,000,000	$3,892,265
**Queen's Club Championships**	€410,200	$4,353,699
**Wimbledon Championships**	£2,000,000	$7,084,099
Cincinnati Masters	$409,270	$7,493,369
US Open	$450,000	$7,943,369
**China Open**	$663,575	$8,606,944
**Shanghai Masters**	$1,043,375	$9,650,319
**Vienna Open**	€428,800	$10,116,810
**Paris Masters**	€746,550	$10,936,821
**ATP World Tour Finals**	$2,391,000	$13,327,821
**Bonus Pool**	$2,978,119	$16,327,821
		$16,327,821
**Doubles**
Event	Prize money	Year-to-date
Indian Wells Masters	$5,930	$5,930
Monte-Carlo Masters	€14,000	$21,880
		$21,880
**Total**
		$16,349,701

Figures in United States dollars (USD) unless noted.

Bold denotes tournament win

== See also ==
- 2016 ATP World Tour
- 2016 Roger Federer tennis season
- 2016 Rafael Nadal tennis season
- 2016 Novak Djokovic tennis season
- 2016 Stan Wawrinka tennis season
