= 2016 Stan Wawrinka tennis season =

- Full name: Stan Wawrinka
- Country: Switzerland
- Calendar prize money: $6,099,060

Singles
- Season record: 46–18
- Calendar titles: 4
- Year-end ranking: No. 4
- Ranking change from previous year: Steady

Grand Slam & significant results
- Australian Open: 4R
- French Open: SF
- Wimbledon: 2R
- US Open: W
- Other tournaments
- Tour Finals: RR
- Olympic Games: A

Doubles
- Season record: 1–1
- Calendar titles: 0
- Current ranking: 567
- Ranking change from previous year: ▼384

The 2016 Stan Wawrinka tennis season begins at the Chennai Open, where he won the fourth title and the third in a row at Chennai.

== Year summary ==
=== Australian Open and early hard court season ===
==== Chennai ====
Wawrinka started his 2016 tennis campaign by playing at the 2016 Aircel Chennai Open, where he was bidding for his third straight title win in a row. Wawrinka won against Andrey Rublev, Guillermo García-López and Benoît Paire in straight sets, before facing Borna Ćorić in the final. At the final, he won the match in straight sets 6-3 7-5, winning him also his fourth Chennai title in his career, and his twelfth career title overall.

==== Australian Open ====
After winning the title in Chennai, Wawrinka participated in the first Grand Slam of the season in the 2016 Australian Open. He first faced Dmitry Tursunov who is participating on his first Grand Slam after more than a year of being absent on the tour due to injury. Wawrinka won the first two sets before Tursunov retired from the match. Wawrinka then faced Radek Štěpánek in the second round, where he was able to defeat the Czech in straight sets. He then faced another Czech in Lukáš Rosol in the third round, where Wawrinka defeated him also in straight sets. At the fourth round, he faced Canadian Milos Raonic in the fourth round. Raonic was able to win the first two sets against Wawrinka, but Wawrinka was able to push the match into a decider. Wawrinka was not able to fully come back however, as Raonic was able to win the deciding set 6-3. The loss stops the streak of six straight Grand Slam quarterfinals that started during the 2014 Wimbledon Championships.

=== Indoor hard-court tournaments ===
Wawrinka did not appear in Rotterdam to defend his title.

==== Marseille ====
Wawrinka after receiving a first round bye would get revenge on Sergiy Stakhovsky in a tight three set match, who defeated him in the quarterfinals the previous year, but he would go on to lose to good friend Benoît Paire in the next round in three sets.

==== Dubai ====
After being two points from defeat in his opening round match against Stakhovsky, Wawrinka proceeded to defeat qualifier Franko Skugor, Philipp Kohlschreiber, and Nick Kyrgios (in their first match since the Montreal incident in 2015) in succession, before defeating Marcos Baghdatis in straight sets to win the Dubai Duty Free title.

=== March Masters ===
==== Indian Wells ====
Wawrinka advanced to the round of 16, where he was defeated by David Goffin in a final set tiebreak.

==== Miami Open ====
Wawrinka lost his opening round match to Andrey Kuznetsov (tennis)

=== European clay court season ===
==== Monte Carlo ====
Wawrinka lost in the quarterfinals to eventual champion Rafael Nadal.

After early exits in Madrid and Rome, Wawrinka won the Geneva Open, defeating Marin Cilic in the final in two close sets.

==== Roland Garros ====
Wawrinka entered as the defending champion. In the first round he survived Lukas Rosol, coming from 2 sets to 1 down to win in five. He went on to reach the semifinals, where his title defense was ended by Andy Murray in four sets.

=== Grass court season ===
==== Queen's Club Championships ====
Wawrinka lost his opening match to Fernando Verdasco in straight sets.

==== Wimbledon ====
Wawrinka defeated rising star Taylor Fritz in four close sets in the first round. He was then upset by Juan Martin del Potro in the second round in four close sets.

=== North American Hard Court Swing ===
==== Canadian Open ====
Wawrinka advanced to the semifinals, where he was defeated by Kei Nishikori in straight sets.

==== Cincinnati Masters (Western & Southern Open) ====
Wawrinka was upset by Grigor Dimitrov in straight sets in the Round of 16.

==== US Open ====
Wawrinka started the tournament with straight sets wins over Fernando Verdasco and Alessandro Giannessi. In the third round Wawrinka saved a match point in the fourth set before beating Dan Evans (tennis) in 5 sets. He then beat Illya Marchenko, Juan Martín del Potro, and Kei Nishikori, each in four sets to reach his first US Open final. In the final, Wawrinka beat defending champion Novak Djokovic in four sets to win his 3rd grand slam title and first at the US Open.

== All matches ==
This table chronicles all the matches of Stan Wawrinka in 2016, including walkovers (W/O) which the ATP does not count as wins. They are marked ND for non-decision or no decision.

Key
W	F	SF	QF	#R	RR	Q#	P#	DNQ	A	Z#	PO	G	S	B	NMS	NTI	P	NH

(W) winner; (F) finalist; (SF) semifinalist; (QF) quarterfinalist; (#R) rounds 4, 3, 2, 1; (RR) round-robin stage; (Q#) qualification round; (P#) preliminary round; (DNQ) did not qualify; (A) absent; (Z#) Davis/Fed Cup Zonal Group (with number indication) or (PO) play-off; (G) gold, (S) silver or (B) bronze Olympic/Paralympic medal; (NMS) not a Masters tournament; (NTI) not a Tier I tournament; (P) postponed; (NH) not held; (SR) strike rate (events won / competed); (W–L) win–loss record.
To avoid confusion and double counting, these charts are updated at the conclusion of a tournament or when the player's participation has ended.

=== Singles matches ===
Tournament	Match	Round	Opponent (seed or key)	Rank	Result	Score
Chennai Open; Chennai, India; ATP 250; Hard, outdoor 5 – 11 January 2016
Chennai Open; Chennai, India; ATP 250; Hard, outdoor 5 – 11 January 2016	–	1R	Bye			
Chennai Open; Chennai, India; ATP 250; Hard, outdoor 5 – 11 January 2016	1 / 627	2R	(Russia) Andrey Rublev (WC)	185	Win	6–3, 6–2
Chennai Open; Chennai, India; ATP 250; Hard, outdoor 5 – 11 January 2016	2 / 628	QF	(Spain) Guillermo García-López (5)	27	Win	6–4, 6–4
Chennai Open; Chennai, India; ATP 250; Hard, outdoor 5 – 11 January 2016	3 / 629	SF	(France) Benoît Paire (3)	19	Win	6–3, 6–4
Chennai Open; Chennai, India; ATP 250; Hard, outdoor 5 – 11 January 2016	4 / 630	W	(Croatia) Borna Ćorić (8)	44	Win (1)	6–3, 7–5
Australian Open; Melbourne, Australia; Grand Slam tournament Hard, outdoor 18 – 31 January 2016
Australian Open; Melbourne, Australia; Grand Slam tournament Hard, outdoor 18 – 31 January 2016	5 / 631	1R	(Russia) Dmitry Tursunov (PR)	265	Win	7–6, 6–3, Ret.
Australian Open; Melbourne, Australia; Grand Slam tournament Hard, outdoor 18 – 31 January 2016	6 / 632	2R	(Czech Republic) Radek Štěpánek (Q)	82	Win	6–2, 6–3, 6–4
Australian Open; Melbourne, Australia; Grand Slam tournament Hard, outdoor 18 – 31 January 2016	7 / 633	3R	(Czech Republic) Lukáš Rosol	51	Win	6–2, 6–3, 7–6^{(7–3)}
Australian Open; Melbourne, Australia; Grand Slam tournament Hard, outdoor 18 – 31 January 2016	8 / 634	4R	(Canada) Milos Raonic (13)	14	Loss	4–6, 3–6, 7–5, 6–4, 3–6
Open 13; Marseille, France; ATP 250; Hard, indoor 15 – 21 February 2016
Open 13; Marseille, France; ATP 250; Hard, indoor 15 – 21 February 2016	–	1R	Bye			
Open 13; Marseille, France; ATP 250; Hard, indoor 15 – 21 February 2016	9 / 635	2R	(Ukraine) Sergiy Stakhovsky	81	Win	6–4, 4–6, 7–6^{(10–8)}
Open 13; Marseille, France; ATP 250; Hard, indoor 15 – 21 February 2016	10 / 636	QF	(France) Benoît Paire (8)	22	Loss	4–6, 6–1, 5–7
Dubai Tennis Championships; Dubai, United Arab Emirates; ATP 500; Hard, outdoor 22 – 27 February 2016
Dubai Tennis Championships; Dubai, United Arab Emirates; ATP 500; Hard, outdoor 22 – 27 February 2016	11 / 637	1R	(Ukraine) Sergiy Stakhovsky	92	Win	5–7, 6–3, 7–5
Dubai Tennis Championships; Dubai, United Arab Emirates; ATP 500; Hard, outdoor 22 – 27 February 2016	12 / 638	2R	(Croatia) Franko Škugor (Q)	188	Win	7–5, 6–1
Dubai Tennis Championships; Dubai, United Arab Emirates; ATP 500; Hard, outdoor 22 – 27 February 2016	13 / 639	QF	(Germany) Philipp Kohlschreiber (8)	28	Win	7–5, 6–1
Dubai Tennis Championships; Dubai, United Arab Emirates; ATP 500; Hard, outdoor 22 – 27 February 2016	14 / 640	SF	(Australia) Nick Kyrgios	33	Win	6–4, 3–0 Ret.
Dubai Tennis Championships; Dubai, United Arab Emirates; ATP 500; Hard, outdoor 22 – 27 February 2016	15 / 641	W	(Cyprus) Marcos Baghdatis	57	Win (2)	6–4, 7–6^{(15–13)}
Indian Wells Masters; Indian Wells, United States; ATP 1000; Hard, outdoor 10 – 20 March 2016
Indian Wells Masters; Indian Wells, United States; ATP 1000; Hard, outdoor 10 – 20 March 2016	–	1R	Bye			
Indian Wells Masters; Indian Wells, United States; ATP 1000; Hard, outdoor 10 – 20 March 2016	16 / 642	2R	(Ukraine) Illya Marchenko	72	Win	6–3, 6–2
Indian Wells Masters; Indian Wells, United States; ATP 1000; Hard, outdoor 10 – 20 March 2016	17 / 643	3R	(Russia) Andrey Kuznetsov	55	Win	6–4, 7–6^{(7–5)}
Indian Wells Masters; Indian Wells, United States; ATP 1000; Hard, outdoor 10 – 20 March 2016	18 / 644	4R	(Belgium) David Goffin (15)	18	Loss	3–6, 7–5, 6–7^{(5–7)}
Miami Open; Miami, United States; ATP 1000; Hard, outdoor 23 March – 03 April 2016
Miami Open; Miami, United States; ATP 1000; Hard, outdoor 23 March – 03 April 2016	–	1R	Bye			
Miami Open; Miami, United States; ATP 1000; Hard, outdoor 23 March – 03 April 2016	19 / 645	2R	(Russia) Andrey Kuznetsov	51	Loss	4–6, 3–6
Monte-Carlo Masters; Monte-Carlo, Monaco; ATP 1000; Clay, outdoor 11 – 17 April 2016
Monte-Carlo Masters; Monte-Carlo, Monaco; ATP 1000; Clay, outdoor 11 – 17 April 2016	–	1R	Bye			
Monte-Carlo Masters; Monte-Carlo, Monaco; ATP 1000; Clay, outdoor 11 – 17 April 2016	20 / 646	2R	(Germany) Philipp Kohlschreiber	28	Win	7–6^{(7–2)}, 7–5
Monte-Carlo Masters; Monte-Carlo, Monaco; ATP 1000; Clay, outdoor 11 – 17 April 2016	21 / 647	3R	(France) Gilles Simon (15)	18	Win	6–1, 6–2
Monte-Carlo Masters; Monte-Carlo, Monaco; ATP 1000; Clay, outdoor 11 – 17 April 2016	22 / 648	QF	(Spain) Rafael Nadal (5)	5	Loss	1–6, 4–6
Madrid Open; Madrid, Spain; ATP 1000; Clay, outdoor 1 – 8 May 2016
Madrid Open; Madrid, Spain; ATP 1000; Clay, outdoor 1 – 8 May 2016	–	1R	Bye			
Madrid Open; Madrid, Spain; ATP 1000; Clay, outdoor 1 – 8 May 2016	23 / 649	2R	(Australia) Nick Kyrgios	21	Loss	6–7^{(7–8)}, 6–7^{(2–7)}
Italian Open; Rome, Italy; ATP 1000; Clay, outdoor 8 – 15 May 2016
Italian Open; Rome, Italy; ATP 1000; Clay, outdoor 8 – 15 May 2016	–	1R	Bye			
Italian Open; Rome, Italy; ATP 1000; Clay, outdoor 8 – 15 May 2016	24 / 650	2R	(France) Benoit Paire	21	Win	5–7, 6–2, 6–1
Italian Open; Rome, Italy; ATP 1000; Clay, outdoor 8 – 15 May 2016	25 / 651	3R	(Argentina) Juan Mónaco (PR)	114	Loss	7–6^{(7–5)}, 3–6, 4–6
Geneva Open; Geneva, Switzerland; ATP 250; Clay, outdoor 15 – 21 May 2016
Geneva Open; Geneva, Switzerland; ATP 250; Clay, outdoor 15 – 21 May 2016	–	1R	Bye			
Geneva Open; Geneva, Switzerland; ATP 250; Clay, outdoor 15 – 21 May 2016	26 / 652	2R	(Spain) Albert Ramos	53	Win	6–1, 6–1
Geneva Open; Geneva, Switzerland; ATP 250; Clay, outdoor 15 – 21 May 2016	27 / 653	QF	(Spain) Pablo Carreño	43	Win	6–3, 6–1
Geneva Open; Geneva, Switzerland; ATP 250; Clay, outdoor 15 – 21 May 2016	28 / 654	SF	(Czech Republic) Lukáš Rosol	68	Win	6–2, 4–6, 6–3
Geneva Open; Geneva, Switzerland; ATP 250; Clay, outdoor 15 – 21 May 2016	29 / 655	W	(Croatia) Marin Čilić	11	Win (3)	6–4, 7–6^{(13–11)}
French Open; Paris, France; Grand Slam tournament Clay, outdoor 22 May – 5 June 2016
French Open; Paris, France; Grand Slam tournament Clay, outdoor 22 May – 5 June 2016	30 / 656	1R	(Czech Republic) Lukáš Rosol	59	Win	4–6, 6–1, 3–6, 6–3, 6–4
French Open; Paris, France; Grand Slam tournament Clay, outdoor 22 May – 5 June 2016	31 / 657	2R	(Japan) Taro Daniel	93	Win	7–6^{(8–6)}, 6–3, 6–4
French Open; Paris, France; Grand Slam tournament Clay, outdoor 22 May – 5 June 2016	32 / 658	3R	(France) Jérémy Chardy (30)	32	Win	6–4, 6–3, 7–5
French Open; Paris, France; Grand Slam tournament Clay, outdoor 22 May – 5 June 2016	33 / 659	4R	(Serbia) Viktor Troicki (22)	24	Win	7–6^{(7–5)}, 6–7^{(7–9)}, 6–3, 6–2
French Open; Paris, France; Grand Slam tournament Clay, outdoor 22 May – 5 June 2016	34 / 660	QF	(Spain) Albert Ramos	55	Win	6–2, 6–1, 7–6^{(9–7)}
French Open; Paris, France; Grand Slam tournament Clay, outdoor 22 May – 5 June 2016	35 / 661	SF	(United Kingdom) Andy Murray (2)	2	Loss	4–6, 2–6, 6–4, 2–6
Queen's Club Championships; London, United Kingdom; ATP 500; Grass, outdoor 13 – 19 June 2016
Queen's Club Championships; London, United Kingdom; ATP 500; Grass, outdoor 13 – 19 June 2016	36 / 662	1R	(Spain) Fernando Verdasco	53	Loss	2–6, 6–7^{(3–7)}
Wimbledon Championships; London, United Kingdom; Grand Slam tournament Grass, outdoor 27 June – 10 July 2016
Wimbledon Championships; London, United Kingdom; Grand Slam tournament Grass, outdoor 27 June – 10 July 2016	37 / 663	1R	(United States) Taylor Fritz	65	Win	7–6^{(7–4)}, 6–1, 6–7^{(2–7)}, 6–4
Wimbledon Championships; London, United Kingdom; Grand Slam tournament Grass, outdoor 27 June – 10 July 2016	38 / 664	2R	(Argentina) Juan Martín del Potro (PR)	165	Loss	6–3, 3–6, 6–7^{(2–7)}, 3–6
Canadian Open; Montreal, Canada; ATP 1000; Hard, outdoor 25 – 31 July 2016
Canadian Open; Montreal, Canada; ATP 1000; Hard, outdoor 25 – 31 July 2016	–	1R	Bye			
Canadian Open; Montreal, Canada; ATP 1000; Hard, outdoor 25 – 31 July 2016	39 / 665	2R	(Russia) Mikhail Youzhny	61	Win	7–6^{(7–3)}, 7–6^{(10–8)}
Canadian Open; Montreal, Canada; ATP 1000; Hard, outdoor 25 – 31 July 2016	40 / 666	3R	(United States) Jack Sock (16)	26	Win	7–6^{(7–5)}, 6–2
Canadian Open; Montreal, Canada; ATP 1000; Hard, outdoor 25 – 31 July 2016	41 / 667	QF	(South Africa) Kevin Anderson	34	Win	6–1, 6–3
Canadian Open; Montreal, Canada; ATP 1000; Hard, outdoor 25 – 31 July 2016	42 / 668	SF	(Japan) Kei Nishikori (3)	6	Loss	6–7^{(6–8)}, 1–6
Cincinnati Masters; Cincinnati, United States; ATP 1000; Hard, outdoor 14 – 21 August 2016
Cincinnati Masters; Cincinnati, United States; ATP 1000; Hard, outdoor 14 – 21 August 2016	–	1R	Bye			
Cincinnati Masters; Cincinnati, United States; ATP 1000; Hard, outdoor 14 – 21 August 2016	43 / 669	2R	(United States) Jared Donaldson (WC)	122	Win	2–6, 6–3, 6–4
Cincinnati Masters; Cincinnati, United States; ATP 1000; Hard, outdoor 14 – 21 August 2016	44 / 670	3R	(Bulgaria) Grigor Dimitrov	34	Loss	4–6, 4–6
US Open; New York City, United States; Grand Slam tournament Hard, outdoor 29 August – 11 September 2016
US Open; New York City, United States; Grand Slam tournament Hard, outdoor 29 August – 11 September 2016	45 / 671	1R	(Spain) Fernando Verdasco	46	Win	7–6^{(7–4)}, 6–4, 6–4
US Open; New York City, United States; Grand Slam tournament Hard, outdoor 29 August – 11 September 2016	46 / 672	2R	(Italy) Alessandro Giannessi (Q)	213	Win	6–1, 7–6^{(7–4)}, 7–5
US Open; New York City, United States; Grand Slam tournament Hard, outdoor 29 August – 11 September 2016	47 / 673	3R	(United Kingdom) Daniel Evans	64	Win	4–6, 6–3, 6–7^{(6–8)}, 7–6^{(10–8)}, 6–2
US Open; New York City, United States; Grand Slam tournament Hard, outdoor 29 August – 11 September 2016	48 / 674	4R	(Ukraine) Illya Marchenko	63	Win	6–4, 6–1, 6–7^{(5–7)}, 6–3
US Open; New York City, United States; Grand Slam tournament Hard, outdoor 29 August – 11 September 2016	49 / 675	QF	(Argentina) Juan Martín del Potro (WC)	142	Win	7–6^{(7–5)}, 4–6, 6–3, 6–2
US Open; New York City, United States; Grand Slam tournament Hard, outdoor 29 August – 11 September 2016	50 / 676	SF	(Japan) Kei Nishikori (6)	7	Win	4–6, 7–5, 6–4, 6–2
US Open; New York City, United States; Grand Slam tournament Hard, outdoor 29 August – 11 September 2016	51 / 677	W	(Serbia) Novak Djokovic (1)	1	Win (4)	6–7^{(1–7)}, 6–4, 7–5, 6–3
St. Petersburg Open; Saint Petersburg, Russia; ATP 250; Hard, indoor 19 – 25 September 2016
St. Petersburg Open; Saint Petersburg, Russia; ATP 250; Hard, indoor 19 – 25 September 2016	–	1R	Bye			
St. Petersburg Open; Saint Petersburg, Russia; ATP 250; Hard, indoor 19 – 25 September 2016	52 / 678	2R	(Czech Republic) Lukáš Rosol	85	Win	6–3, 6–1
St. Petersburg Open; Saint Petersburg, Russia; ATP 250; Hard, indoor 19 – 25 September 2016	53 / 679	QF	(Serbia) Viktor Troicki (7)	33	Win	7–5, 6–2
St. Petersburg Open; Saint Petersburg, Russia; ATP 250; Hard, indoor 19 – 25 September 2016	54 / 680	SF	(Spain) Roberto Bautista Agut (4)	16	Win	7–6^{(10–8)}, 6–2
St. Petersburg Open; Saint Petersburg, Russia; ATP 250; Hard, indoor 19 – 25 September 2016	55 / 681	F	(Germany) Alexander Zverev (5)	27	Loss (1)	2–6, 6–3, 5–7
Shanghai Masters; Shanghai, China; ATP 1000; Hard, outdoor 10 – 16 October 2016
Shanghai Masters; Shanghai, China; ATP 1000; Hard, outdoor 10 – 16 October 2016	–	1R	Bye			
Shanghai Masters; Shanghai, China; ATP 1000; Hard, outdoor 10 – 16 October 2016	56 / 682	2R	(United Kingdom) Kyle Edmund (Q)	48	Win	6–3, 6–4
Shanghai Masters; Shanghai, China; ATP 1000; Hard, outdoor 10 – 16 October 2016	57 / 683	3R	(France) Gilles Simon	32	Loss	4–6, 4–6
Swiss Indoors; Basel, Switzerland; ATP 500; Hard, indoor 24 – 30 October 2016
Swiss Indoors; Basel, Switzerland; ATP 500; Hard, indoor 24 – 30 October 2016	58 / 684	1R	(Switzerland) Marco Chiudinelli (WC)	119	Win	6–7^{(1–7)}, 6–1, 6–4
Swiss Indoors; Basel, Switzerland; ATP 500; Hard, indoor 24 – 30 October 2016	59 / 685	2R	(United States) Donald Young (Q)	83	Win	7–6^{(7–4)}, 6–7^{(3–7)}, 6–4
Swiss Indoors; Basel, Switzerland; ATP 500; Hard, indoor 24 – 30 October 2016	60 / 686	QF	(Germany) Mischa Zverev (Q)	72	Loss	2–6, 7–5, 1–6
Paris Masters; Paris, France; ATP 1000; Hard, indoor 31 October – 6 November 2016
Paris Masters; Paris, France; ATP 1000; Hard, indoor 31 October – 6 November 2016	–	1R	Bye			
Paris Masters; Paris, France; ATP 1000; Hard, indoor 31 October – 6 November 2016	61 / 687	2R	(Germany) Jan-Lennard Struff (Q)	91	Loss	6–3, 6–7^{(6–8)}, 6–7^{(1–7)}
ATP World Tour Finals; London, United Kingdom; ATP Finals; Hard, indoor 13 – 20 November 2016
ATP World Tour Finals; London, United Kingdom; ATP Finals; Hard, indoor 13 – 20 November 2016	62 / 688	RR	(Japan) Kei Nishikori (5)	5	Loss	2–6, 3–6
ATP World Tour Finals; London, United Kingdom; ATP Finals; Hard, indoor 13 – 20 November 2016	63 / 689	RR	(Croatia) Marin Čilić (7)	7	Win	7–6^{(7–3)}, 7–6^{(7–3)}
ATP World Tour Finals; London, United Kingdom; ATP Finals; Hard, indoor 13 – 20 November 2016	64 / 690	RR	(United Kingdom) Andy Murray (1)	1	Loss	4–6, 2–6

=== Doubles matches ===
Tournament	Match	Round	Opponents (seed or key)	Ranks	Result	Score
Canadian Open; Montreal, Canada; ATP 1000; Hard, outdoor 25 – 31 July 2016; Partner: (Bulgaria) Grigor Dimitrov
Canadian Open; Montreal, Canada; ATP 1000; Hard, outdoor 25 – 31 July 2016; Partner: (Bulgaria) Grigor Dimitrov	1	1R	(France) Lucas Pouille / (Austria) Dominic Thiem	#96 / #93	Win	7–6^{(7–2)}, 2–6, [12–10]
Canadian Open; Montreal, Canada; ATP 1000; Hard, outdoor 25 – 31 July 2016; Partner: (Bulgaria) Grigor Dimitrov	2	2R	(Finland) Henri Kontinen / (Australia) John Peers (8)	#26 / #13	Loss	6–7^{(4–7)}, 2–6
Cincinnati Masters; Cincinnati, United States; ATP 1000; Hard, outdoor 15 – 21 August 2016; Partner: (Bulgaria) Grigor Dimitrov
Cincinnati Masters; Cincinnati, United States; ATP 1000; Hard, outdoor 15 – 21 August 2016; Partner: (Bulgaria) Grigor Dimitrov	–	1R	(United States) Eric Butorac / (United States) Taylor Fritz (WC)	#45 / #458	Withdrew	N/A

=== Exhibition matches ===
Tournament	Match	Round	Opponent (Seed or Key)	Rank	Result	Score
Mubadala World Tennis Championship; Abu Dhabi, United Arab Emirates; Singles exhibition Hard, outdoor 31 December 2015 – 2 January 2016
Mubadala World Tennis Championship; Abu Dhabi, United Arab Emirates; Singles exhibition Hard, outdoor 31 December 2015 – 2 January 2016	–	QF	Bye			
Mubadala World Tennis Championship; Abu Dhabi, United Arab Emirates; Singles exhibition Hard, outdoor 31 December 2015 – 2 January 2016	1	SF	(Canada) Milos Raonic (6)	14	Loss	5–7, 5–7
Mubadala World Tennis Championship; Abu Dhabi, United Arab Emirates; Singles exhibition Hard, outdoor 31 December 2015 – 2 January 2016	2	SF-B	(Spain) David Ferrer (3)	7	Loss	7–6^{(7–1)}, 4–6, [8–10]

== Tournament schedule ==
=== Singles ===
Date	Tournament	City	Category	Surface	2015 result	2015 points	2016 points	Outcome
4 January 2016– 10 January 2016	Chennai Open	Chennai	ATP World Tour 250	Hard	W	250	250	Winner (def. Borna Ćorić, 6–3, 7–5)
17 January 2016– 31 January 2016	Australian Open	Melbourne	Grand Slam	Hard	SF	720	180	Fourth round (lost to Milos Raonic, 4–6, 3–6, 7–5, 6–4, 3–6)
15 February 2016– 21 February 2016	Open 13	Marseille	ATP World Tour 250	Hard (i)	QF	45	45	Quarterfinals (lost to Benoît Paire, 4–6, 6–1, 5–7)
22 February 2016– 28 February 2016	Dubai Tennis Championships	Dubai	ATP World Tour 500	Hard	DNS	0	500	Winner (def. Marcos Baghdatis, 6–4, 7–6^{(15–13)})
7 March 2016– 20 March 2016	Indian Wells Masters	Indian Wells	ATP Masters 1000	Hard	2R	10	90	Fourth round (lost to David Goffin, 3–6, 7–5, 6–7^{(5–7)})
21 March 2016– 3 April 2016	Miami Open	Miami	ATP Masters 1000	Hard	3R	45	10	Second round (lost to Andrey Kuznetsov, 4–6, 3–6)
11 April 2016– 17 April 2016	Monte-Carlo Masters	Monte-Carlo	ATP Masters 1000	Clay	3R	90	180	Quarterfinals (lost to Rafael Nadal, 1–6, 4–6)
1 May 2016– 8 May 2016	Madrid Open	Madrid	ATP Masters 1000	Clay	3R	90	10	Second round (lost to Nick Kyrgios, 6–7^{(7–9)}, 6–7^{(2–7)})
8 May 2016– 15 May 2016	Italian Open	Rome	ATP Masters 1000	Clay	SF	360	90	Third round (lost to Juan Mónaco, 7–6^{(7–5)}, 3–6, 4–6)
15 May 2016– 21 May 2016	Geneva Open	Geneva	ATP World Tour 250	Clay	QF	45	250	Winner (def. Marin Čilić, 6–4, 7–6^{(13–11)})
22 May 2016– 5 June 2016	French Open	Paris	Grand Slam	Clay	W	2000	720	Semifinal (lost to Andy Murray, 4–6, 2–6, 6–4, 2–6)
13 June 2016– 19 June 2016	Queen's Club Championships	London	ATP World Tour 500	Grass	2R	45	0	First round (lost to Fernando Verdasco, 2–6, 6–7^{(3–7)})
27 June 2016– 10 July 2016	Wimbledon	London	Grand Slam	Grass	QF	360	45	Second round (lost to Juan Martín del Potro, 6–3, 3–6, 6–7^{(2–7)}, 4–6)
25 July 2016– 31 July 2016	Canadian Open	Toronto	ATP Masters 1000	Hard	2R	10	360	Semifinal (lost to Kei Nishikori, 6–7^{(6–8)}, 1–6)
8 August 2016– 14 August 2016	Olympic Games	Rio de Janeiro	Olympic Games	Hard	N/A	N/A	N/A	Withdrew
14 August 2016– 21 August 2016	Cincinnati Masters	Cincinnati	ATP Masters 1000	Hard	QF	180	90	Third round (lost to Grigor Dimitrov, 4–6, 4–6)
29 August 2016– 11 September 2016	US Open	New York City	Grand Slam	Hard	SF	720	2000	Winner (def. Novak Djokovic, 6–7^{(1–7)}, 6–4, 7–5, 6–3)
19 September 2016– 25 September 2016	St. Petersburg Open	Saint Petersburg	ATP World Tour 250	Hard (i)	N/A	N/A	150	Final (lost to Alexander Zverev, 2–6, 6–3, 5–7)
3 October 2016– 9 October 2016	Japan Open	Tokyo	ATP World Tour 500	Hard	W	500	N/A	Withdrew
10 October 2016– 16 October 2016	Shanghai Masters	Shanghai	ATP Masters 1000	Hard	QF	180	90	Third round (lost to Gilles Simon, 4–6, 4–6)
24 October 2016– 30 October 2016	Swiss Indoors	Basel	ATP World Tour 500	Hard (i)	1R	0	90	Quarterfinals (lost to Mischa Zverev, 2–6, 7–5, 1–6)
31 October 2016– 6 November 2016	Paris Masters	Paris	ATP Masters 1000	Hard (i)	SF	360	10	Second round (lost to Jan-Lennard Struff, 6–3, 6–7^{(6–8)}, 6–7^{(1–7)})
13 November 2016– 20 November 2016	ATP World Tour Finals	London	ATP World Tour Finals	Hard (i)	SF	400	200	Did not advance from the group stage
Total year-end points						6900	5315	▼1585 difference

== Yearly records ==
=== Head-to-head matchups ===
Stan Wawrinka had a 46–18 match win–loss record in the 2016 season. His record against players who were part of the ATP rankings Top Ten at the time of their meetings was 3–5. The following list is ordered by number of wins:

- (Czech Republic) Lukáš Rosol 4–0
- (Croatia) Marin Čilić 2–0
- (Germany) Philipp Kohlschreiber 2–0
- (Ukraine) Illya Marchenko 2–0
- (Ukraine) Sergiy Stakhovsky 2–0
- (Serbia) Viktor Troicki 2–0
- (Spain) Albert Ramos 2–0
- (France) Benoît Paire 2–1
- (South Africa) Kevin Anderson 1–0
- (Cyprus) Marcos Baghdatis 1–0
- (Spain) Roberto Bautista Agut 1–0
- (Spain) Pablo Carreño 1–0
- (France) Jérémy Chardy 1–0
- (Switzerland) Marco Chiudinelli 1–0
- (Croatia) Borna Ćorić 1–0
- (Japan) Taro Daniel 1–0
- (Serbia) Novak Djokovic 1–0
- (United States) Jared Donaldson 1–0
- (United Kingdom) Kyle Edmund 1–0
- (United Kingdom) Daniel Evans 1–0
- (United States) Taylor Fritz 1–0
- (Spain) Guillermo García López 1–0
- (Italy) Alessandro Giannessi 1–0
- (Russia) Andrey Rublev 1–0
- (United States) Jack Sock 1–0
- (Croatia) Franko Škugor 1–0
- (Czech Republic) Radek Štěpánek 1–0
- (Russia) Dmitry Tursunov 1–0
- (United States) Donald Young 1–0
- (Russia) Mikhail Youzhny 1–0
- (Argentina) Juan Martín del Potro 1–1
- (Australia) Nick Kyrgios 1–1
- (Russia) Andrey Kuznetsov 1–1
- (France) Gilles Simon 1–1
- (Spain) Fernando Verdasco 1–1
- (Japan) Kei Nishikori 1–2
- (Bulgaria) Grigor Dimitrov 0–1
- (Belgium) David Goffin 0–1
- (Argentina) Juan Mónaco 0–1
- (Spain) Rafael Nadal 0–1
- (Canada) Milos Raonic 0–1
- (Germany) Alexander Zverev 0–1
- (Germany) Mischa Zverev 0–1
- (Germany) Jan-Lennard Struff 0–1
- (United Kingdom) Andy Murray 0–2

=== Finals ===
==== Singles: 5 (4–1) ====
Category Grand Slam (1–0) ATP World Tour Finals (0–0) ATP World Tour Masters 1000 (0–0) ATP World Tour 500 (1–0) ATP World Tour 250 (2–1)	Titles by surface Hard (3–1) Clay (1–0) Grass (0–0)	Titles by conditions Outdoors (4–0) Indoors (0–1)

Outcome	No.	Date	Championship	Surface	Opponent	Score
Winner	12.	10 January 2016	Chennai Open, Chennai, India (4)	Hard	(Croatia) Borna Ćorić	6–3, 7–5
Winner	13.	27 February 2016	Dubai Tennis Championships, Dubai, UAE	Hard	(Cyprus) Marcos Baghdatis	6–4, 7–6^{(15–13)}
Winner	14.	21 May 2016	Geneva Open, Geneva, Switzerland	Clay	(Croatia) Marin Čilić	6–4, 7–6^{(13–11)}
Winner	15.	11 September 2016	US Open, New York City, USA	Hard	(Serbia) Novak Djokovic	6–7^{(1–7)}, 6–4, 7–5, 6–3
Runner-up	10.	25 September 2016	St. Petersburg Open, St. Petersburg, Russia	Hard (i)	(Germany) Alexander Zverev	2–6, 6–3, 5–7

=== Earnings ===
Event	Prize money	Year-to-date
Aircel Chennai Open	$75,700	$75,700
Australian Open	A$193,000	$208,079
Open 13	€17,260	$227,502
Dubai Tennis Championships	$511,750	$739,252
Indian Wells Masters	$67,590	$806,842
Miami Masters	$19,530	$826,372
Monte-Carlo Masters	€90,010	$928,919
Madrid Open	€31,365	$964,814
Italian Open	€46,740	$1,018,112
Geneva Open	€88,900	$1,118,596
French Open	€500,000	$1,679,595
Aegon Championships	€12,755	$1,693,944
Wimbledon Championships	£50,000	$1,762,204
Canadian Open	$200,995	$1,955,303
Cincinnati Masters	$54,930	$2,009,694
US Open	$3,500,000	$5,509,694
St. Petersburg Open	$86,100	$5,595,793
Shanghai Masters	$67,990	$5,663,783
Swiss Indoors	€45,135	$5,712,885
Paris Masters	€25,650	$5,741,060
ATP World Tour Finals	$358,000	$6,099,059
		$6,099,059

Figures in United States dollars (USD) unless noted.

== See also ==
- 2016 ATP World Tour
- 2016 Roger Federer tennis season
- 2016 Rafael Nadal tennis season
- 2016 Novak Djokovic tennis season
- 2016 Andy Murray tennis season
