= 2016 Roger Federer tennis season =

Statistics for Swiss tennis player

- Full name: Roger Federer
- Country: Switzerland
- Calendar prize money: $1,527,269

Singles
- Season record: 21–7
- Year-end ranking: No. 16
- Ranking change from previous year: ▼13

Grand Slam & significant results
- Australian Open: SF
- French Open: A
- Wimbledon: SF
- US Open: A
- Other tournaments
- Olympic Games: A

Doubles
- Season record: 0–0
- Year-end ranking: Unranked

Mixed doubles
- Season record: 0–0

Grand Slam mixed doubles results
- Other Mixed Doubles tournaments
- Olympic Games: A

Injuries
- Injuries: Knee injury following Australian Open and Wimbledon (season ending); Back injury following Monte-Carlo Masters

Roger Federer's 2016 tennis season officially commenced on 3 January 2016, with the start of the Brisbane International, and ended on 8 July 2016, with a loss in the semifinals of the Wimbledon Championships.

This season saw Federer suffer from a knee injury which sidelined him for the majority of the year. After surgery, Federer returned but was hindered by a back injury which kept him out of the French Open, therefore ending his record of 65 consecutive appearances at Grand Slam tournaments.

On July 26 Federer officially ended his season early, not wanting to risk damaging his knee further. Federer would thus end the year at No. 16 in the ATP rankings, marking the first time that he dropped out of the top 10 since 2002. Additionally, this was the first season since 2000 in which Federer did not win a singles title.

== Year summary ==
=== Early hard court season ===
==== Brisbane International ====
Federer opened his season at the Brisbane International for the third consecutive year, after winning the title in 2015. As the top seed, he received a bye in the first round. Although suffering with the flu virus, he beat Tobias Kamke in the second round in straight sets. He then defeated Grigor Dimitrov in three sets to advance to the semifinals. In the semifinals, he defeated Dominic Thiem in straight sets to advance to his third consecutive final at the tournament. He faced Milos Raonic in a repeat of the 2015 final, losing in straight sets. According with himself, Federer's performance was hindered throughout the tournament due to the flu virus.

==== Australian Open ====
Federer entered the Australian Open as the third seed. He defeated Nikoloz Basilashvili and Alexandr Dolgopolov, both in three straight sets to advance to the third round. There, he beat Grigor Dimitrov in four sets, in a win that marked Federer's 300th match win at a Grand Slam. He became the first man in the open era to reach this milestone and the second overall player behind Martina Navratilova, who won 306 matches. He reached the quarterfinals with an easy three set win over David Goffin in the fourth round. He then defeated Tomáš Berdych in straight sets to advance to his 12th Australian Open semifinal, where he faced Novak Djokovic in their first match of the year and their 45th meeting overall. Federer lost the match in four sets and this loss put Djokovic ahead in their rivalry for the first time.

==== Injury hiatus ====
In the day after his loss to Djokovic, Federer sustained a knee injury. In early February, he underwent arthroscopic surgery to repair a torn meniscus, thus missing both the scheduled Rotterdam Open and Dubai Tennis Championships. Later in the month, Federer announced he would also miss the Indian Wells Masters. In March, it was confirmed that he would make his return at the Miami Open.

==== Miami Open ====
As the third seed, and after a first round bye, Federer was scheduled to face Juan Martín del Potro in the second round in his comeback match. However, he would pull out of the tournament due to contracting a stomach virus, thus prolonging his time on the sidelines.

=== Spring clay court season ===
==== Monte-Carlo Masters ====
After a ten-week hiatus, Federer made his return at the first clay court Masters 1000 tournament, the Monte-Carlo Masters. As the third seed, he received a first round bye and in the second round won his first match since January by defeating Guillermo García López in straight sets to advance to the third round. He proceeded to defeat Roberto Bautista Agut to reach the quarterfinals, where he lost to Jo-Wilfried Tsonga in three sets despite being two points away from the win.

==== Madrid Open ====
Federer was expected to play the Madrid Open, but he was forced to withdraw from the tournament due to a back injury.

==== Italian Open ====
Upon pulling out of Madrid, Federer entered the Italian Open. Despite that, and after a first round bye, he stated that he almost withdrew prior to his opening round due to lingering fitness issues. However, after a morning practice, he decided to play rising teenage star Alexander Zverev, defeating him in straight sets. Again at the last minute, Federer decided to play his third round match against Dominic Thiem, but this time he was beaten in straight sets as the back injury continued to hamper his speed and movement. This tournament cast further doubt on Federer's participation in the upcoming French Open.

Federer ended up withdrawing from the second major of the year not wanting to further aggravate his injury before the start of the grass court season. That marked the end of his all-time record run of 65 consecutive appearances at majors, which began in the 2000 Australian Open.

=== Grass court season ===
==== Stuttgart Open ====
Federer took advantage of the recently expanded grass court season, first instituted in 2015, by playing in a newly minted grass court tournament, the Stuttgart Open. After a bye in the first round he started the tournament by defeating Taylor Fritz in three sets, in a rainy match played over two days. In the quarterfinals, he defeated qualifier Florian Mayer in straight sets, advancing to the semifinals. In the semifinals, he lost to No. 3 seed Dominic Thiem after holding two match points in the second set tiebreak. He lost a grass court match after having a match point for only the second time in his career.

==== Halle Open ====
Federer then entered the Halle Open as an eight-time champion and three-time defending champion. He defeated Jan-Lennard Struff, Malek Jaziri and David Goffin in the first three rounds, reaching the semifinals without losing a set in the process. In the semifinals, however, he lost to 19-year-old Alexander Zverev in three sets. Remarkably, this was the first time in which Federer lost before the final in this tournament since the 2002 edition.

==== Wimbledon ====
After a short break, Federer travelled to London to play Wimbledon, his second major of the year. He began the tournament with victories over Guido Pella, qualifier Marcus Willis, Daniel Evans and Steve Johnson, all in straight sets, reaching the quarterfinals in the process. In the quarterfinals he played and defeated Marin Čilić in an extremely tight match, in which he lost the first two sets before coming back to win the next three, saving three match points in the fourth set. However, he ended up losing to world No. 7 Milos Raonic in the semifinals after another tight five-setter.

=== Out for the rest of the season ===
On July 26 Federer announced that he would not play anymore in 2016, due to a knee injury, therefore not being able to defend his titles at the Cincinnati Masters and the Swiss Indoors as well as the runner-up position at the US Open. As a result, Federer dropped out of the top 5 in the ATP rankings for the first time since the week of 3 March 2014. His ranking also fell out of the top 10 for the first time since 2002, ending a remarkable 14-year streak. This was also the first season since 2000 in which Federer did not win a singles title in a calendar year.

== All matches ==
This table chronicles all the matches of Roger Federer in 2016, including walkovers (W/O) which the ATP does not count as wins or losses.

Key
W	F	SF	QF	#R	RR	Q#	P#	DNQ	A	Z#	PO	G	S	B	NMS	NTI	P	NH

(W) winner; (F) finalist; (SF) semifinalist; (QF) quarterfinalist; (#R) rounds 4, 3, 2, 1; (RR) round-robin stage; (Q#) qualification round; (P#) preliminary round; (DNQ) did not qualify; (A) absent; (Z#) Davis/Fed Cup Zonal Group (with number indication) or (PO) play-off; (G) gold, (S) silver or (B) bronze Olympic/Paralympic medal; (NMS) not a Masters tournament; (NTI) not a Tier I tournament; (P) postponed; (NH) not held; (SR) strike rate (events won / competed); (W–L) win–loss record.

=== Singles matches ===
Tournament	Match	Round	Opponent (seed or key)	Rank	Result	Score
Brisbane International; Brisbane, Australia; ATP 250; Hard, outdoor 3 – 10 January 2016
Brisbane International; Brisbane, Australia; ATP 250; Hard, outdoor 3 – 10 January 2016	–	1R	Bye			
Brisbane International; Brisbane, Australia; ATP 250; Hard, outdoor 3 – 10 January 2016	1 / 1298	2R	(Germany) Tobias Kamke (Q)	277	Win	6–2, 6–1
Brisbane International; Brisbane, Australia; ATP 250; Hard, outdoor 3 – 10 January 2016	2 / 1299	QF	(Bulgaria) Grigor Dimitrov	28	Win	6–4, 6–7^{(4–7)}, 6–4
Brisbane International; Brisbane, Australia; ATP 250; Hard, outdoor 3 – 10 January 2016	3 / 1300	SF	(Austria) Dominic Thiem (8)	20	Win	6–1, 6–4
Brisbane International; Brisbane, Australia; ATP 250; Hard, outdoor 3 – 10 January 2016	4 / 1301	F	(Canada) Milos Raonic (4)	14	Loss (1)	4–6, 4–6
Australian Open; Melbourne, Australia; Grand Slam tournament Hard, outdoor 18 – 31 January 2016
Australian Open; Melbourne, Australia; Grand Slam tournament Hard, outdoor 18 – 31 January 2016	5 / 1302	1R	(Georgia (country)) Nikoloz Basilashvili	118	Win	6–2, 6–1, 6–2
Australian Open; Melbourne, Australia; Grand Slam tournament Hard, outdoor 18 – 31 January 2016	6 / 1303	2R	(Ukraine) Alexandr Dolgopolov	35	Win	6–3, 7–5, 6–1
Australian Open; Melbourne, Australia; Grand Slam tournament Hard, outdoor 18 – 31 January 2016	7 / 1304	3R	(Bulgaria) Grigor Dimitrov (27)	28	Win	6–4, 3–6, 6–1, 6–4
Australian Open; Melbourne, Australia; Grand Slam tournament Hard, outdoor 18 – 31 January 2016	8 / 1305	4R	(Belgium) David Goffin (15)	16	Win	6–2, 6–1, 6–4
Australian Open; Melbourne, Australia; Grand Slam tournament Hard, outdoor 18 – 31 January 2016	9 / 1306	QF	(Czech Republic) Tomáš Berdych (6)	6	Win	7–6^{(7–4)}, 6–2, 6–4
Australian Open; Melbourne, Australia; Grand Slam tournament Hard, outdoor 18 – 31 January 2016	10 / 1307	SF	(Serbia) Novak Djokovic (1)	1	Loss	1–6, 2–6, 6–3, 3–6
Miami Open; Miami, United States; ATP 1000; Hard, outdoor 21 March – 3 April 2016
Miami Open; Miami, United States; ATP 1000; Hard, outdoor 21 March – 3 April 2016	Withdrew					
Monte-Carlo Masters; Monte Carlo, Monaco; ATP 1000; Clay, outdoor 10 – 17 April 2016
Monte-Carlo Masters; Monte Carlo, Monaco; ATP 1000; Clay, outdoor 10 – 17 April 2016	–	1R	Bye			
Monte-Carlo Masters; Monte Carlo, Monaco; ATP 1000; Clay, outdoor 10 – 17 April 2016	11 / 1308	2R	(Spain) Guillermo García López	38	Win	6–3, 6–4
Monte-Carlo Masters; Monte Carlo, Monaco; ATP 1000; Clay, outdoor 10 – 17 April 2016	12 / 1309	3R	(Spain) Roberto Bautista Agut (14)	17	Win	6–2, 6–4
Monte-Carlo Masters; Monte Carlo, Monaco; ATP 1000; Clay, outdoor 10 – 17 April 2016	13 / 1310	QF	(France) Jo-Wilfried Tsonga (8)	9	Loss	6–3, 2–6, 5–7
Madrid Open; Madrid, Spain; ATP 1000; Clay, outdoor 30 April – 8 May 2016
Madrid Open; Madrid, Spain; ATP 1000; Clay, outdoor 30 April – 8 May 2016	Withdrew					
Italian Open; Rome, Italy; ATP 1000; Clay, outdoor 9 – 15 May 2016
Italian Open; Rome, Italy; ATP 1000; Clay, outdoor 9 – 15 May 2016	–	1R	Bye			
Italian Open; Rome, Italy; ATP 1000; Clay, outdoor 9 – 15 May 2016	14 / 1311	2R	(Germany) Alexander Zverev	44	Win	6–3, 7–5
Italian Open; Rome, Italy; ATP 1000; Clay, outdoor 9 – 15 May 2016	15 / 1312	3R	(Austria) Dominic Thiem (13)	15	Loss	6–7^{(2–7)}, 4–6
Stuttgart Open; Stuttgart, Germany; ATP 250; Grass, outdoor 6 – 13 June 2016
Stuttgart Open; Stuttgart, Germany; ATP 250; Grass, outdoor 6 – 13 June 2016	–	1R	Bye			
Stuttgart Open; Stuttgart, Germany; ATP 250; Grass, outdoor 6 – 13 June 2016	16 / 1313	2R	(United States) Taylor Fritz	65	Win	6–4, 5–7, 6–4
Stuttgart Open; Stuttgart, Germany; ATP 250; Grass, outdoor 6 – 13 June 2016	17 / 1314	QF	(Germany) Florian Mayer (Q)	226	Win	7–6^{(7–2)}, 7–6^{(7–1)}
Stuttgart Open; Stuttgart, Germany; ATP 250; Grass, outdoor 6 – 13 June 2016	18 / 1315	SF	(Austria) Dominic Thiem (3)	7	Loss	6–3, 6–7^{(7–9)}, 4–6
Halle Open; Halle, Germany; ATP 500; Grass, outdoor 13 – 19 June 2016
Halle Open; Halle, Germany; ATP 500; Grass, outdoor 13 – 19 June 2016	19 / 1316	1R	(Germany) Jan-Lennard Struff (WC)	88	Win	6–4, 7–6^{(7–3)}
Halle Open; Halle, Germany; ATP 500; Grass, outdoor 13 – 19 June 2016	20 / 1317	2R	(Tunisia) Malek Jaziri	64	Win	6–3, 7–5
Halle Open; Halle, Germany; ATP 500; Grass, outdoor 13 – 19 June 2016	21 / 1318	QF	(Belgium) David Goffin (5)	11	Win	6–1, 7–6^{(12–10)}
Halle Open; Halle, Germany; ATP 500; Grass, outdoor 13 – 19 June 2016	22 / 1319	SF	(Germany) Alexander Zverev	38	Loss	6–7^{(4–7)}, 7–5, 3–6
Wimbledon Championships; London, United Kingdom; Grand Slam tournament Grass, outdoor 27 June – 10 July 2016
Wimbledon Championships; London, United Kingdom; Grand Slam tournament Grass, outdoor 27 June – 10 July 2016	23 / 1320	1R	(Argentina) Guido Pella	52	Win	7–6^{(7–5)}, 7–6^{(7–3)}, 6–3
Wimbledon Championships; London, United Kingdom; Grand Slam tournament Grass, outdoor 27 June – 10 July 2016	24 / 1321	2R	(United Kingdom) Marcus Willis (Q)	772	Win	6–0, 6–3, 6–4
Wimbledon Championships; London, United Kingdom; Grand Slam tournament Grass, outdoor 27 June – 10 July 2016	25 / 1322	3R	(United Kingdom) Daniel Evans	91	Win	6–4, 6–2, 6–2
Wimbledon Championships; London, United Kingdom; Grand Slam tournament Grass, outdoor 27 June – 10 July 2016	26 / 1323	4R	(United States) Steve Johnson	29	Win	6–2, 6–3, 7–5
Wimbledon Championships; London, United Kingdom; Grand Slam tournament Grass, outdoor 27 June – 10 July 2016	27 / 1324	QF	(Croatia) Marin Čilić (9)	13	Win	6–7^{(4–7)}, 4–6, 6–3, 7–6^{(11–9)}, 6–3
Wimbledon Championships; London, United Kingdom; Grand Slam tournament Grass, outdoor 27 June – 10 July 2016	28 / 1325	SF	(Canada) Milos Raonic (6)	7	Loss	3–6, 7–6^{(7–3)}, 6–4, 5–7, 3–6

== Schedule ==
=== Singles schedule ===
Date	Tournament	Location	Category	Surface	Prev. result	Prev. points	New points	Result
3 January 2016– 10 January 2016	Brisbane International	Brisbane (AUS)	250 Series	Hard	W	250	150	Final (lost to Milos Raonic, 4–6, 4–6)
18 January 2016– 31 January 2016	Australian Open	Melbourne (AUS)	Grand Slam	Hard	3R	90	720	Semifinals (lost to Novak Djokovic, 1–6, 2–6, 6–3, 3–6)
21 March 2016– 3 April 2016	Miami Open	Miami (USA)	Masters 1000	Hard	A	N/A	N/A	Withdrew due to stomach virus
10 April 2016– 17 April 2016	Monte-Carlo Masters	Monte Carlo (MON)	Masters 1000	Clay	3R	90	180	Quarterfinals (lost to Jo-Wilfried Tsonga, 6–3, 2–6, 5–7)
30 April 2016– 8 May 2016	Madrid Open	Madrid (ESP)	Masters 1000	Clay	2R	10	N/A	Withdrew due to back injury
9 May 2016– 15 May 2016	Italian Open	Rome (ITA)	Masters 1000	Clay	F	600	90	Third round (lost to Dominic Thiem 6–7^{(2–7)}, 4–6)
6 June 2016– 13 June 2016	Stuttgart Open	Stuttgart (GER)	250 Series	Grass	A	N/A	90	Semifinals (lost to Dominic Thiem, 6–3, 6–7^{(7–9)}, 4–6)
13 June 2016– 19 June 2016	Halle Open	Halle (GER)	500 Series	Grass	W	500	180	Semifinals (lost to Alexander Zverev, 6–7^{(4–7)}, 7–5, 3–6)
27 June 2016– 10 July 2016	Wimbledon	London (GBR)	Grand Slam	Grass	F	1200	720	Semifinals (lost to Milos Raonic, 3–6, 7–6^{(7–3)}, 6–4, 5–7, 3–6)
Total year-end points						8265	2130	▼6135 difference

== Yearly records ==
=== Head-to-head matchups ===
Roger Federer has a 21–7 ATP match win–loss record in the 2016 season. His record against players who were part of the ATP rankings Top Ten at the time of their meetings is 1–4. Bold indicates player was ranked top 10 at time of at least one meeting. The following list is ordered by number of wins:

- (Bulgaria) Grigor Dimitrov 2–0
- (Belgium) David Goffin 2–0
- (Georgia (country)) Nikoloz Basilashvili 1–0
- (Spain) Roberto Bautista Agut 1–0
- (Czech Republic) **Tomáš Berdych** 1–0
- (Croatia) Marin Čilić 1–0
- (Ukraine) Alexandr Dolgopolov 1–0
- (United Kingdom) Daniel Evans 1–0
- (United States) Taylor Fritz 1–0
- (Spain) Guillermo García-López 1–0
- (Tunisia) Malek Jaziri 1–0
- (United States) Steve Johnson 1–0
- (Germany) Tobias Kamke 1–0
- (Germany) Florian Mayer 1–0
- (Argentina) Guido Pella 1–0
- (Germany) Jan-Lennard Struff 1–0
- (United Kingdom) Marcus Willis 1–0
- (Germany) Alexander Zverev 1–1
- (Austria) **Dominic Thiem** 1–2
- (Serbia) **Novak Djokovic** 0–1
- (France) **Jo-Wilfried Tsonga** 0–1
- (Canada) **Milos Raonic** 0–2

=== Finals ===
==== Singles: 1 (1 runner-up) ====
Category Grand Slam (0–0) ATP World Tour Finals (0–0) ATP World Tour Masters 1000 (0–0) ATP World Tour 500 (0–0) ATP World Tour 250 (0–1)	Titles by surface Hard (0–1) Clay (0–0) Grass (0–0)	Titles by setting Outdoor (0–1) Indoor (0–0)

Result	W–L	Date	Tournament	Tier	Surface	Opponent	Score
Loss	0–1	Jan 2016	Brisbane International, Australia	250 Series	Hard	(Canada) Milos Raonic	4–6, 4–6

=== Earnings ===
Event	Prize money	Year-to-date
Brisbane International	$37,900	$37,900
Australian Open	A$750,000	$552,325
Monte-Carlo Masters	€90,010	$654,873
Italian Open	€46,740	$708,171
Stuttgart Open	€30,790	$743,163
Halle Open	€90,235	$844,669
Wimbledon	£500,000	$1,527,269
		$1,527,269

Figures in United States dollars (USD) unless noted.

=== Awards ===
- Stefan Edberg Sportsmanship Award
  - Record twelfth award in career (sixth consecutive)
- ATPWorldTour.com Fans' Favourite
  - Record fourteenth consecutive award in career

== See also ==
- 2016 ATP World Tour
- 2016 Rafael Nadal tennis season
- 2016 Novak Djokovic tennis season
- 2016 Andy Murray tennis season
- 2016 Stan Wawrinka tennis season
