= 2016 Erste Bank Open – Doubles =

Doubles
- 2016 Erste Bank Open

Final
- Champions: (Poland) Łukasz Kubot (Brazil) Marcelo Melo
- Runners-up: (Austria) Oliver Marach (France) Fabrice Martin
- Score: 4–6, 6–3, [13–11]

Details
- Draw: 16
- Seeds: 4

Events
Singles	Doubles
← 2015 ·	Vienna Open	· 2017 →

Łukasz Kubot and Marcelo Melo were the defending champions and successfully defended their title, defeating Oliver Marach and Fabrice Martin in the final, 4–6, 6–3, [13–11].

== Seeds ==
1. (United Kingdom) Jamie Murray / (Brazil) Bruno Soares (semifinals)
2. (United States) Bob Bryan / (United States) Mike Bryan (semifinals)
3. (Spain) Feliciano López / (Spain) Marc López (quarterfinals)
4. (Poland) Łukasz Kubot / (Brazil) Marcelo Melo (champions)

== Draw ==
=== Key ===
- Q = Qualifier
- WC = Wild card
- LL = Lucky loser
- Alt = Alternate
- SE = Special exempt
- PR = Protected ranking
- ITF = ITF entry
- JE = Junior exempt
- w/o = Walkover
- r = Retired
- d = Defaulted
- SR = Special ranking

=== Draw ===
First round
1	(United Kingdom) J Murray (Brazil) B Soares	4	7	[10]
(United States) J Isner (United States) S Lipsky	6	5	[6]
(Croatia) M Pavić (Austria) A Peya	3	6	[10]
Q	(Argentina) G Durán (Poland) M Fyrstenberg	6	3	[12]
3	(Spain) F López (Spain) M López	6	7^{7}
WC	(Austria) J Knowle (Austria) J Melzer	3	6^{5}
(Austria) O Marach (France) F Martin	6	7^{7}
(Spain) A Ramos-Viñolas (Portugal) J Sousa	2	6^{4}
PR	(United States) S Johnson (Germany) P Petzschner	6^{6}	6	[12]
(Mexico) S González (Pakistan) A-u-H Qureshi	7^{8}	2	[10]
(United States) N Monroe (New Zealand) A Sitak	4	4
4	(Poland) Ł Kubot (Brazil) M Melo	6	6
(Uruguay) P Cuevas (Serbia) V Troicki	6	6
(India) R Bopanna (Canada) D Nestor	4	4
WC	(Austria) D Novak (Austria) D Thiem	0	1
2	(United States) B Bryan (United States) M Bryan	6	6

Quarterfinals
1	(United Kingdom) J Murray (Brazil) B Soares	7^{7}	6
Q	(Argentina) G Durán (Poland) M Fyrstenberg	6^{5}	4
3	(Spain) F López (Spain) M López	1	2
(Austria) O Marach (France) F Martin	6	6
PR	(United States) S Johnson (Germany) P Petzschner	5	3
4	(Poland) Ł Kubot (Brazil) M Melo	7	6
(Uruguay) P Cuevas (Serbia) V Troicki	4	6	[7]
2	(United States) B Bryan (United States) M Bryan	6	4	[10]

Semifinals
1	(United Kingdom) J Murray (Brazil) B Soares	6	3	[9]
(Austria) O Marach (France) F Martin	1	6	[11]
4	(Poland) Ł Kubot (Brazil) M Melo	4	6	[12]
2	(United States) B Bryan (United States) M Bryan	6	2	[10]

Final
(Austria) O Marach (France) F Martin	6	3	[11]
4	(Poland) Ł Kubot (Brazil) M Melo	4	6	[13]

== Qualifying ==
=== Seeds ===
1. (New Zealand) Marcus Daniell / (Brazil) Marcelo Demoliner (qualifying competition)
2. (Argentina) Guillermo Durán / (Poland) Mariusz Fyrstenberg (qualified)

=== Qualifiers ===
1. (Argentina) Guillermo Durán / (Poland) Mariusz Fyrstenberg

=== Qualifying draw ===
First round
1	(New Zealand) Marcus Daniell (Brazil) Marcelo Demoliner	4	6	[10]
(Austria) Gerald Melzer (Austria) Tristan-Samuel Weissborn	6	3	[8]
(Moldova) Radu Albot (Italy) Andreas Seppi	7	3	[8]
2	(Argentina) Guillermo Durán (Poland) Mariusz Fyrstenberg	5	6	[10]

Qualifying competition
1	(New Zealand) Marcus Daniell (Brazil) Marcelo Demoliner	2	7	[9]
2	(Argentina) Guillermo Durán (Poland) Mariusz Fyrstenberg	6	5	[11]
