= 2016 Erste Bank Open – Singles =

Singles
- 2016 Erste Bank Open

Final
- Champion: (United Kingdom) Andy Murray
- Runner-up: (France) Jo-Wilfried Tsonga
- Score: 6–3, 7–6^{(8–6)}

Details
- Draw: 32
- Seeds: 8

Events
Singles	Doubles
← 2015 ·	Vienna Open	· 2017 →

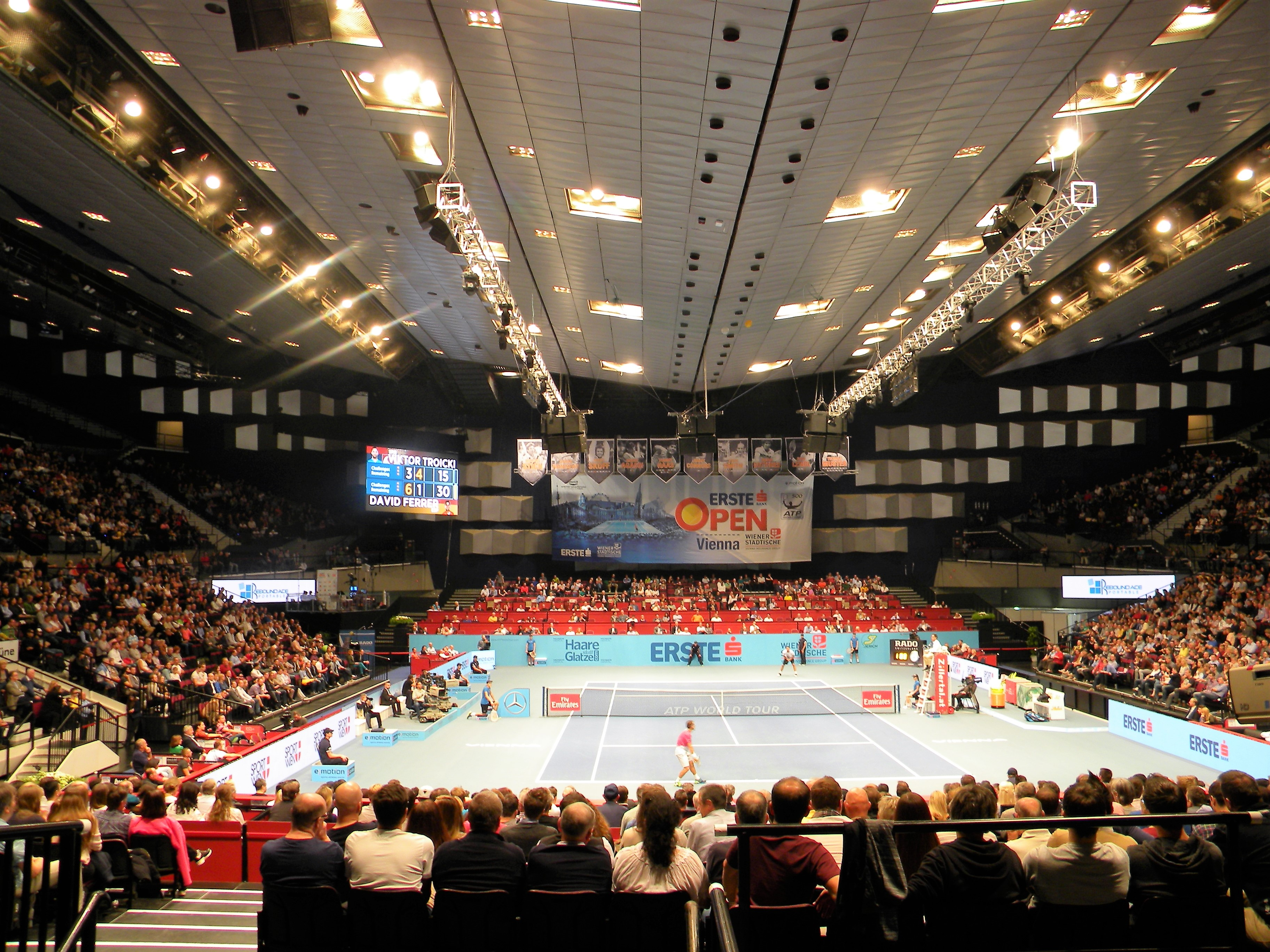
David Ferrer (Spain) against Viktor Troicki (Serbia), Quarterfinals

Andy Murray defeated Jo-Wilfried Tsonga in the final, 6–3, 7–6^{(8–6)} to win the singles tennis title at the 2016 Vienna Open.

David Ferrer was the defending champion, but withdrew from his semifinal match against Murray.

== Seeds ==
1. (United Kingdom) Andy Murray (champion)
2. (Czech Republic) Tomáš Berdych (first round)
3. (Austria) Dominic Thiem (second round)
4. (Spain) Roberto Bautista Agut (first round)
5. (Spain) David Ferrer (semifinals, withdrew)
6. (France) Jo-Wilfried Tsonga (final)
7. (France) Lucas Pouille (first round)
8. (Croatia) Ivo Karlović (semifinals)

== Draw ==
Key

- Q = Qualifier
- WC = Wild card
- LL = Lucky loser
- Alt = Alternate
- ITF = ITF entry
- PR = Protected ranking
- SR = Special ranking
- SE = Special exempt
- JE = Junior exempt
- JR = Junior Accelerator Programme entrant
- CO = College Accelerator Programme entrant
- NG = Next Gen Accelerator Program entrant
- w/o = Walkover
- r = Retired
- d = Defaulted

=== Finals ===
Semifinals
1	(United Kingdom) Andy Murray	w/o
5	(Spain) David Ferrer
6	(France) Jo-Wilfried Tsonga	5	7	7^{8}
8	(Croatia) Ivo Karlović	7	5	6^{6}

Final
1	(United Kingdom) Andy Murray	6	7^{8}
6	(France) Jo-Wilfried Tsonga	3	6^{6}

=== Top half ===
First round
1	(United Kingdom) A Murray	6	6^{5}	6
(Slovakia) M Kližan	3	7^{7}	0
(Spain) G García-López	4	5
(France) G Simon	6	7
Q	(Germany) J-L Struff	7^{7}	3	4
(United States) J Isner	6^{1}	6	6
(Spain) F López	6	2	7
7	(France) L Pouille	4	6	5
3	(Austria) D Thiem	6	6
WC	(Austria) G Melzer	0	3
(South Africa) K Anderson	6	6^{5}	5
(Serbia) V Troicki	4	7^{7}	7
(Portugal) J Sousa	6	3
(Uruguay) P Cuevas	3	0^{r}
(United Kingdom) K Edmund	2^{r}
5	(Spain) D Ferrer	3

Second round
1	(United Kingdom) A Murray	4	6	6
(France) G Simon	6	2	2
(United States) J Isner	7^{7}	3	7^{7}
(Spain) F López	6^{1}	6	6^{2}
3	(Austria) D Thiem	2	5
(Serbia) V Troicki	6	7
(Portugal) J Sousa	2	6^{4}
5	(Spain) D Ferrer	6	7^{7}

Quarterfinals
1	(United Kingdom) A Murray	6	6
(United States) J Isner	1	3
(Serbia) V Troicki	3	6	5
5	(Spain) D Ferrer	6	3	7

Semifinals
1	(United Kingdom) A Murray	w/o
5	(Spain) D Ferrer

=== Bottom half ===
First round
6	(France) J-W Tsonga	6	6
Q	(Germany) B Becker	3	4
(France) S Robert	6	3	6^{3}
(Germany) P Kohlschreiber	4	6	7^{7}
(Italy) F Fognini	2	2
(Spain) A Ramos-Viñolas	6	6
WC	(Austria) J Melzer	6	7
4	(Spain) R Bautista Agut	3	5
8	(Croatia) I Karlović	7^{7}	6
(United States) S Johnson	6^{5}	3
(Spain) N Almagro	3	7	0
Q	(Bosnia and Herzegovina) D Džumhur	6	5	6
(Italy) A Seppi	4	4
WC	(Russia) K Khachanov	6	6
Q	(Georgia (country)) N Basilashvili	6	6^{5}	7
2	(Czech Republic) T Berdych	4	7^{7}	5

Second round
6	(France) J-W Tsonga	7^{8}	6
(Germany) P Kohlschreiber	6^{6}	2
(Spain) A Ramos-Viñolas	3	6	6
WC	(Austria) J Melzer	6	4	0
8	(Croatia) I Karlović	7^{8}	4	7^{7}
Q	(Bosnia and Herzegovina) D Džumhur	6^{6}	6	6^{5}
WC	(Russia) K Khachanov	6	7
Q	(Georgia (country)) N Basilashvili	2	5

Quarterfinals
6	(France) J-W Tsonga	6	7^{7}
(Spain) A Ramos-Viñolas	2	6^{5}
8	(Croatia) I Karlović	6^{5}	7^{7}	6
WC	(Russia) K Khachanov	7^{7}	6^{5}	3

Semifinals
6	(France) J-W Tsonga	5	7	7^{8}
8	(Croatia) I Karlović	7	5	6^{6}

== Qualifying ==
=== Seeds ===
1. (Brazil) Thomaz Bellucci (first round)
2. (Spain) Íñigo Cervantes (first round)
3. (Japan) Yūichi Sugita (qualifying competition)
4. (Czech Republic) Adam Pavlásek (qualifying competition)
5. (Czech Republic) Lukáš Rosol (first round)
6. (Bosnia and Herzegovina) Damir Džumhur (qualified)
7. (Germany) Jan-Lennard Struff (qualified)
8. (Moldova) Radu Albot (qualifying competition)

=== Qualifiers ===
1. (Georgia (country)) Nikoloz Basilashvili
2. (Germany) Jan-Lennard Struff
3. (Germany) Benjamin Becker
4. (Bosnia and Herzegovina) Damir Džumhur

=== Qualifying draw ===
==== First qualifier ====
First round
1	(Brazil) Thomaz Bellucci	2	6^{5}
(Georgia (country)) Nikoloz Basilashvili	6	7^{7}
WC	(United Kingdom) Marcus Willis	3	7^{11}	4
8	(Moldova) Radu Albot	6	6^{9}	6

Qualifying competition
(Georgia (country)) Nikoloz Basilashvili	6	0	6
8	(Moldova) Radu Albot	3	6	3

==== Second qualifier ====
First round
2	(Spain) Íñigo Cervantes	4	6^{6}
WC	(Austria) Sebastian Ofner	6	7^{8}
WC	(Austria) Dennis Novak	3	7^{7}	4
7	(Germany) Jan-Lennard Struff	6	6^{5}	6

Qualifying competition
WC	(Austria) Sebastian Ofner	1	2
7	(Germany) Jan-Lennard Struff	6	6

==== Third qualifier ====
First round
3	(Japan) Yūichi Sugita	6	6
(Belarus) Uladzimir Ignatik	2	1
(Germany) Benjamin Becker	7^{7}	5	7^{7}
5	(Czech Republic) Lukáš Rosol	6^{0}	7	6^{4}

Qualifying competition
3	(Japan) Yūichi Sugita	6^{5}	3
(Germany) Benjamin Becker	7^{7}	6

==== Fourth qualifier ====
First round
4	(Czech Republic) Adam Pavlásek	6	6
(Italy) Lorenzo Giustino	4	3
(Germany) Peter Gojowczyk	3	5
6	(Bosnia and Herzegovina) Damir Džumhur	6	7

Qualifying competition
4	(Czech Republic) Adam Pavlásek	7^{8}	4	5
6	(Bosnia and Herzegovina) Damir Džumhur	6^{6}	6	7
