= 2016 Erste Bank Open =

- Date: 24–30 October
- Edition: 42nd
- Category: ATP World Tour 500 Series
- Draw: 32S / 16D
- Prize money: €1,884,645
- Surface: Hard
- Location: Vienna, Austria
- Venue: Wiener Stadthalle

Champions

Singles
- (United Kingdom) Andy Murray

Doubles
- (Poland) Łukasz Kubot / (Brazil) Marcelo Melo
- Vienna Open

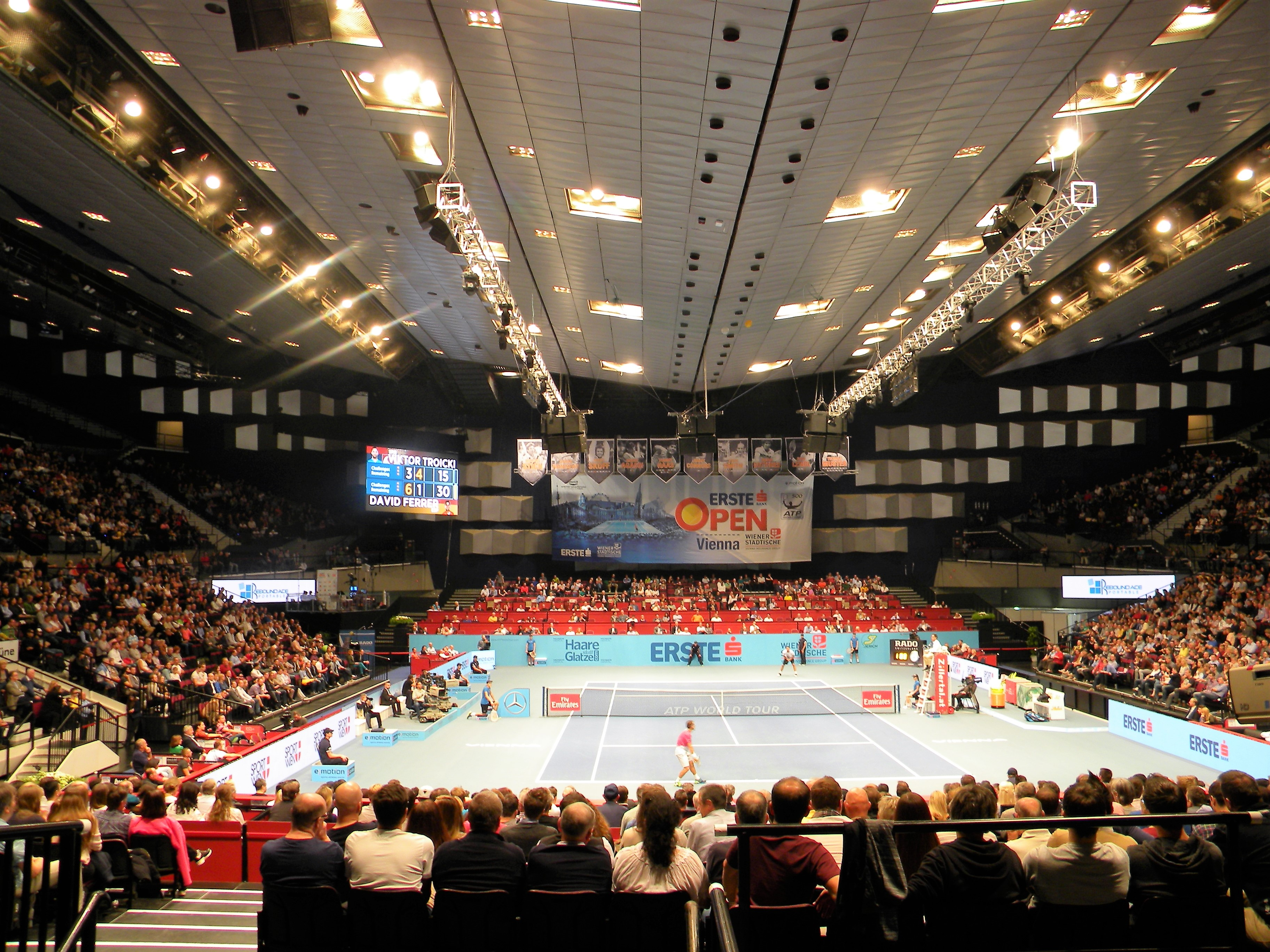
David Ferrer (Spain) against Viktor Troicki (Serbia), Quarterfinals

The 2016 Erste Bank Open 500 was a men's tennis tournament played on indoor hard courts. It was the 42nd edition of the event, and part of the ATP World Tour 500 Series of the 2016 ATP World Tour. It was held at the Wiener Stadthalle in Vienna, Austria, from 24 October through 30 October 2016. First-seeded Andy Murray won the singles title.

== Finals ==
=== Singles ===
- (United Kingdom) Andy Murray defeated (France) Jo-Wilfried Tsonga, 6–3, 7–6^{(8–6)}

=== Doubles ===
- (Poland) Łukasz Kubot / (Brazil) Marcelo Melo defeated (Austria) Oliver Marach / (France) Fabrice Martin, 4–6, 6–3, [13–11]

== Points and prize money ==
=== Point distribution ===
Event	W	F	SF	QF	Round of 16	Round of 32	Q	Q2	Q1
Singles	500	300	180	90	45	0	20	10	0
Doubles	500	300	180	90	0	—N/a	—N/a	—N/a	—N/a

=== Prize money ===
Event	W	F	SF	QF	Round of 16	Round of 32	Q2	Q1
Singles	€428,800	€201,380	€100,000	€50,000	€25,335	€13,335	€2,220	€1,220
Doubles	€126,400	€59,720	€28,820	€14,980	€7,850	—N/a	—N/a	—N/a

== Singles main-draw entrants ==
=== Seeds ===
Country	Player	Rank^{1}	Seed
GBR	Andy Murray	2	1
CZE	Tomáš Berdych	9	2
AUT	Dominic Thiem	10	3
ESP	Roberto Bautista Agut	13	4
ESP	David Ferrer	15	5
FRA	Jo-Wilfried Tsonga	16	6
FRA	Lucas Pouille	17	7
CRO	Ivo Karlović	21	8

- Rankings are as of October 17, 2016

=== Other entrants ===
The following players received wildcards into the singles main draw:

- (Russia) Karen Khachanov
- (Austria) Gerald Melzer
- (Austria) Jürgen Melzer

The following players received entry from the qualifying draw:

- (Georgia (country)) Nikoloz Basilashvili
- (Germany) Benjamin Becker
- (Bosnia and Herzegovina) Damir Džumhur
- (Germany) Jan-Lennard Struff

=== Withdrawals ===
Before the tournament

- (United States) Sam Querrey →replaced by (Spain) Nicolás Almagro
- (Australia) Bernard Tomic →replaced by (France) Stéphane Robert

During the tournament

- (Spain) David Ferrer

=== Retirements ===
- (Uruguay) Pablo Cuevas
- (United Kingdom) Kyle Edmund

== Doubles main-draw entrants ==
=== Seeds ===
Country	Player	Country	Player	Rank^{1}	Seed
GBR	Jamie Murray	BRA	Bruno Soares	5	1
USA	Bob Bryan	USA	Mike Bryan	11	2
ESP	Feliciano López	ESP	Marc López	23	3
POL	Łukasz Kubot	BRA	Marcelo Melo	32	4

- Rankings are as of October 17, 2016

=== Other entrants ===
The following pairs received wildcards into the doubles main draw:

- (Austria) Julian Knowle / (Austria) Jürgen Melzer
- (Austria) Dennis Novak / (Austria) Dominic Thiem

The following pair received entry from the qualifying draw:

- (Argentina) Guillermo Durán / (Poland) Mariusz Fyrstenberg
