= 2016 Shanghai Rolex Masters =

- Date: October 9–16
- Edition: 8th
- Category: ATP World Tour Masters 1000
- Surface: Hard / Outdoor
- Location: Shanghai, China
- Venue: Qizhong Forest Sports City Arena

Champions

Singles
- (United Kingdom) Andy Murray

Doubles
- (United States) John Isner / (United States) Jack Sock
- Shanghai Masters

The 2016 Shanghai Rolex Masters was a tennis tournament played on outdoor hard courts. It was the eighth edition of the Shanghai ATP Masters 1000, classified as an ATP World Tour Masters 1000 event on the 2016 ATP World Tour. It took place at Qizhong Forest Sports City Arena in Shanghai, China from October 9 to October 16, 2016.

== Points and prize money ==
=== Point distribution ===
Event	W	F	SF	QF	Round of 16	Round of 32	Round of 64	Q	Q2	Q1
Singles	1,000	600	360	180	90	45	10	25	16	0
Doubles	1,000	600	360	180	90	0	—N/a	—N/a	—N/a	—N/a

=== Prize money ===
Event	W	F	SF	QF	Round of 16	Round of 32	Round of 64	Q2	Q1
Singles	$1,043,375	$511,600	$257,475	$130,925	$67,990	$35,845	$19,350	$4,460	$2,275
Doubles	$323,100	$158,190	$79,350	$40,730	$21,050	$11,110	—N/a	—N/a	—N/a

== Singles main-draw entrants ==
=== Seeds ===
Country	Player	Rank^{1}	Seed
SRB	Novak Djokovic	1	1
GBR	Andy Murray	2	2
SUI	Stan Wawrinka	3	3
ESP	Rafael Nadal	4	4
CAN	Milos Raonic	6	5
FRA	Gaël Monfils	8	6
CZE	Tomáš Berdych	9	7
CRO	Marin Čilić	11	8
FRA	Jo-Wilfried Tsonga	12	9
ESP	David Ferrer	13	10
BEL	David Goffin	14	11
AUS	Nick Kyrgios	15	12
FRA	Lucas Pouille	16	13
FRA	Richard Gasquet	17	14
ESP	Roberto Bautista Agut	18	15
URU	Pablo Cuevas	19	16

- ^{1} Rankings are as of October 3, 2016

=== Other entrants ===
The following players received wildcards into the singles main draw:

- (Argentina) Juan Martín del Potro
- (China) Li Zhe
- (China) Wu Di
- (China) Zhang Ze

The following player using a protected ranking into the singles main draw:

- (Germany) Florian Mayer
- (Serbia) Janko Tipsarević

The following players received entry from the qualifying draw:

- (United Kingdom) Kyle Edmund
- (United States) Taylor Fritz
- (Canada) Vasek Pospisil
- (Czech Republic) Lukáš Rosol
- (Japan) Yūichi Sugita
- (Russia) Mikhail Youzhny
- (Germany) Mischa Zverev

=== Withdrawals ===
Before the tournament

- (Croatia) Borna Ćorić →replaced by (Argentina) Federico Delbonis
- (Switzerland) Roger Federer →replaced by (Spain) Marcel Granollers
- (France) Nicolas Mahut →replaced by (Spain) Fernando Verdasco
- (Luxembourg) Gilles Müller →replaced by (Spain) Nicolás Almagro
- (Japan) Kei Nishikori →replaced by (Spain) Guillermo García López
- (Austria) Dominic Thiem →replaced by (Argentina) Guido Pella

== Doubles main-draw entrants ==
=== Seeds ===
Country	Player	Country	Player	Rank^{1}	Seed
GBR	Jamie Murray	BRA	Bruno Soares	9	1
USA	Bob Bryan	USA	Mike Bryan	13	2
POL	Łukasz Kubot	BRA	Marcelo Melo	26	3
ESP	Feliciano López	ESP	Marc López	28	4
RSA	Raven Klaasen	USA	Rajeev Ram	29	5
IND	Rohan Bopanna	CAN	Daniel Nestor	32	6
PHI	Treat Huey	BLR	Max Mirnyi	44	7
SWE	Robert Lindstedt	CAN	Vasek Pospisil	46	8

- Rankings are as of October 3, 2016

=== Other entrants ===
The following pairs received wildcards into the doubles main draw:

- (China) Gong Maoxin / (China) Zhang Ze
- (China) Li Zhe / (China) Wu Di

== Finals ==
=== Singles ===
- (United Kingdom) Andy Murray defeated (Spain) Roberto Bautista Agut 7–6^{(7–1)}, 6–1

=== Doubles ===
- (United States) John Isner / (United States) Jack Sock defeated (Finland) Henri Kontinen / (Australia) John Peers 6–4, 6–4

== Controversies ==
Nick Kyrgios was fined nearly US$17,000 for 'lack of best efforts' in his second round match against Mischa Zverev. Kyrgios threw the match 6–3 6–1, at one point asking the umpire, "Can you call time so I can finish this match and go home?" When later asked during a press conference if he thought he owed the fans a better effort, he responded: "What does that even mean? I'm good at hitting a tennis ball at the net. Big deal. I don't owe them anything. If you don't like it, I didn't ask you to come watch. Just leave."
