= 2016 Monte-Carlo Rolex Masters =

- Date: 10 – 17 April
- Edition: 110th
- Category: Masters 1000
- Draw: 56S / 24D
- Prize money: €3,748,925
- Surface: Clay
- Location: Roquebrune-Cap-Martin, France (billed as Monte Carlo, Monaco)
- Venue: Monte Carlo Country Club

Champions

Singles
- (Spain) Rafael Nadal

Doubles
- (France) Pierre-Hugues Herbert / (France) Nicolas Mahut
← 2015 ·	Monte-Carlo Masters	· 2017 →

The 2016 Monte-Carlo Masters was a tennis tournament for male professional players, played from 10 April through 17 April 2016, on outdoor clay courts. It was the 110th edition of the annual Monte Carlo Masters tournament, sponsored by Rolex for the eighth time. It took place at the Monte Carlo Country Club in Roquebrune-Cap-Martin, France (though billed as Monte Carlo, Monaco).

== Points ==
Because the Monte Carlo Masters is the non-mandatory Masters 1000 event, special rules regarding points distribution are in place. The Monte Carlo Masters counts as one of a player's 500 level tournaments, while distributing Masters 1000 points.

Event	W	F	SF	QF	Round of 16	Round of 32	Round of 64	Q	Q2	Q1
Men's singles	1,000	600	360	180	90	45	10	25	16	0
Men's doubles	1,000	600	360	180	90	45	0	—	—	—

== Singles main draw entrants ==
=== Seeds ===
Country	Player	Rank	Seed
SRB	Novak Djokovic	1	1
GBR	Andy Murray	2	2
SUI	Roger Federer	3	3
SUI	Stan Wawrinka	4	4
ESP	Rafael Nadal	5	5
CZE	Tomáš Berdych	7	6
~~ESP~~	~~David Ferrer~~	~~8~~	~~7~~
FRA	Jo-Wilfried Tsonga	9	8
FRA	Richard Gasquet	10	9
CAN	Milos Raonic	12	10
BEL	David Goffin	13	11
AUT	Dominic Thiem	14	12
FRA	Gaël Monfils	16	13
ESP	Roberto Bautista Agut	17	14
FRA	Gilles Simon	19	15
FRA	Benoît Paire	22	16

- Rankings are as of April 4, 2016

=== Other entrants ===
The following players received wildcards into the main draw:

- (Italy) Marco Cecchinato
- (France) Lucas Pouille
- (Russia) Andrey Rublev
- (Spain) Fernando Verdasco

The following players received entry from the qualifying draw:

- (Japan) Taro Daniel
- (Bosnia and Herzegovina) Damir Džumhur
- (Spain) Daniel Gimeno-Traver
- (France) Pierre-Hugues Herbert
- (Serbia) Filip Krajinović
- (France) Stéphane Robert
- (Germany) Jan-Lennard Struff

The following player received entry as a lucky loser:

- (Spain) Marcel Granollers

=== Withdrawals ===
Before the tournament

- (Croatia) Marin Čilić →replaced by (Netherlands) Robin Haase
- (Germany) Tommy Haas →replaced by (Germany) Alexander Zverev
- (Slovakia) Martin Kližan →replaced by (Spain) Íñigo Cervantes
- (Spain) Tommy Robredo →replaced by (France) Adrian Mannarino
- (Australia) Bernard Tomic →replaced by (Spain) Nicolás Almagro
- (Spain) David Ferrer(late withdrawal) →replaced by (Spain) Marcel Granollers

== Doubles main draw entrants ==
=== Seeds ===
Country	Player	Country	Player	Rank	Seed
NED	Jean-Julien Rojer	ROU	Horia Tecău	7	1
CRO	Ivan Dodig	BRA	Marcelo Melo	11	2
FRA	Pierre-Hugues Herbert	FRA	Nicolas Mahut	11	3
GBR	Jamie Murray	BRA	Bruno Soares	13	4
USA	Bob Bryan	USA	Mike Bryan	15	5
IND	Rohan Bopanna	ROU	Florin Mergea	24	6
FRA	Édouard Roger-Vasselin	SRB	Nenad Zimonjić	33	7
POL	Łukasz Kubot	POL	Marcin Matkowski	45	8

- Rankings are as of April 4, 2016

=== Other entrants ===
The following pairs received wildcards into the doubles main draw:

- (Italy) Fabio Fognini / (Italy) Paolo Lorenzi
- (Spain) Rafael Nadal / (Spain) Fernando Verdasco

=== Withdrawals ===
During the tournament

- (Spain) Fernando Verdasco (calf injury)

== Finals ==
=== Singles ===
- (Spain) Rafael Nadal defeated (France) Gaël Monfils, 7–5, 5–7, 6–0

=== Doubles ===
- (France) Pierre-Hugues Herbert / (France) Nicolas Mahut defeated (United Kingdom) Jamie Murray / (Brazil) Bruno Soares, 4–6, 6–0, [10–6]
