= 2016 in tennis =

This page covers all the important events in the sport of tennis in 2016. Primarily, it provides the results of notable tournaments throughout the year on both the ATP and WTA Tours, the Davis Cup, and the Fed Cup.

== ITF ==
=== Grand Slam events ===
| Category | Championship | Champion | Finalist | Score in the final |
|---|---|---|---|---|
| Men's singles | Australian Open | (Serbia) Novak Djokovic | (United Kingdom) Andy Murray | 6–1, 7–5, 7–6^{(7–3)} |
| Men's singles | French Open | (Serbia) Novak Djokovic | (United Kingdom) Andy Murray | 3–6, 6–1, 6–2, 6–4 |
| Men's singles | Wimbledon | (United Kingdom) Andy Murray | (Canada) Milos Raonic | 6–4, 7–6^{(7–3)}, 7–6^{(7–2)} |
| Men's singles | US Open | (Switzerland) Stan Wawrinka | (Serbia) Novak Djokovic | 6–7^{(1–7)}, 6–4, 7–5, 6–3 |

| Category | Championship | Champion | Finalist | Score in the final |
|---|---|---|---|---|
| Women's singles | Australian Open | (Germany) Angelique Kerber | (United States) Serena Williams | 6–4, 3–6, 6–4 |
| Women's singles | French Open | (Spain) Garbiñe Muguruza | (United States) Serena Williams | 7–5, 6–4 |
| Women's singles | Wimbledon | (United States) Serena Williams | (Germany) Angelique Kerber | 7–5, 6–3 |
| Women's singles | US Open | (Germany) Angelique Kerber | (Czech Republic) Karolína Plíšková | 6–3, 4–6, 6–4 |

| Category | Championship | Champions | Finalists | Score in the final |
|---|---|---|---|---|
| Men's Doubles | Australian Open | (United Kingdom) Jamie Murray (Brazil) Bruno Soares | (Canada) Daniel Nestor (Czech Republic) Radek Štěpánek | 2–6, 6–4, 7–5 |
| Men's Doubles | French Open | (Spain) Feliciano López (Spain) Marc López | (United States) Bob Bryan (United States) Mike Bryan | 6–4, 6–7^{(6–8)}, 6–3 |
| Men's Doubles | Wimbledon | (France) Pierre-Hugues Herbert (France) Nicolas Mahut | (France) Julien Benneteau (France) Édouard Roger-Vasselin | 6–4, 7–6^{(7–1)}, 6–3 |
| Men's Doubles | US Open | (United Kingdom) Jamie Murray (Brazil) Bruno Soares | (Spain) Pablo Carreño Busta (Spain) Guillermo García-López | 6–2, 6–3 |

| Category | Championship | Champions | Finalists | Score in the final |
|---|---|---|---|---|
| Women's Doubles | Australian Open | (Switzerland) Martina Hingis (India) Sania Mirza | (Czech Republic) Andrea Hlaváčková (Czech Republic) Lucie Hradecká | 7–6^{(7–1)}, 6–3 |
| Women's Doubles | French Open | (France) Caroline Garcia (France) Kristina Mladenovic | (Russia) Ekaterina Makarova (Russia) Elena Vesnina | 6–3, 2–6, 6–4 |
| Women's Doubles | Wimbledon | (United States) Serena Williams (United States) Venus Williams | (Hungary) Tímea Babos (Kazakhstan) Yaroslava Shvedova | 6–3, 6–4 |
| Women's Doubles | US Open | (United States) Bethanie Mattek-Sands (Czech Republic) Lucie Šafářová | (France) Caroline Garcia (France) Kristina Mladenovic | 2–6, 7–6^{(7–5)}, 6–4 |

| Category | Championship | Champions | Finalists | Score in the final |
|---|---|---|---|---|
| Mixed Doubles | Australian Open | (Russia) Elena Vesnina (Brazil) Bruno Soares | (United States) Coco Vandeweghe (Romania) Horia Tecău | 6–4, 4–6, [10–5] |
| Mixed Doubles | French Open | (Switzerland) Martina Hingis (India) Leander Paes | (India) Sania Mirza (Croatia) Ivan Dodig | 4–6, 6–4, [10–8] |
| Mixed Doubles | Wimbledon | (Finland) Henri Kontinen (United Kingdom) Heather Watson | (Colombia) Robert Farah (Germany) Anna-Lena Grönefeld | 7–6^{(7–5)}, 6–4 |
| Mixed Doubles | US Open | (Germany) Laura Siegemund (Croatia) Mate Pavić | (United States) Coco Vandeweghe (United States) Rajeev Ram | 6–4, 6–4 |

=== Davis Cup ===
First round 4–6 March
Birmingham, Great Britain (indoor hard)
1 | Great Britain | 3
Japan | 1
Belgrade, Serbia (indoor hard)
7 | Serbia | 3
Kazakhstan | 2
Pesaro, Italy (indoor clay)
4 | Switzerland | 0
Italy | 5
Gdańsk, Poland (indoor hard)
6 | Argentina | 3
Poland | 2
Baie-Mahault, Guadeloupe, France (clay)
Canada | 0
5 | France | 4
Hannover, Germany (indoor hard)
Germany | 2
3 | Czech Republic | 3
Kooyong, Australia (grass)
United States | 3
8 | Australia | 1
Liège, Belgium (indoor clay)
Croatia | 3
2 | Belgium | 2

Quarterfinals; 15–17 July
Belgrade, Serbia (clay)
1 | Great Britain | 3
7 | Serbia | 2
Pesaro, Italy (clay)
Italy | 1
6 | Argentina | 3
Třinec, Czech Republic (indoor hard)
5 | France | 3
3 | Czech Republic | 1
Portland, United States (hard)
United States | 2
Croatia | 3

Semifinals; 16–18 September
Great Britain
1 | Great Britain | 2
6 | Argentina | 3
Croatia
5 | France | 2
Croatia | 3

Final; 25–27 November
6 | Argentina | 3
Croatia | 2

=== Fed Cup ===
Quarterfinals; 5–6 February
Cluj-Napoca, Romania
1 | Czech Republic | 3
Romania | 2
Leipzig, Germany
Switzerland | 3
3 | Germany | 2
Marseille, France
4 | Italy | 1
France | 4
Moscow, Russia
Netherlands | 3
2 | Russia | 1

Semifinals; 16–17 April
Lucerne, Switzerland
1 | Czech Republic | 3
Switzerland | 2
Trélazé, France
France | 3
Netherlands | 2

Final; 12–13 November
TBA, France
1 | Czech Republic | 3
France | 2

== IOC ==
=== 2016 Summer Olympics ===
- August 6–14: Summer Olympics

| Event | Category | Gold medalist | Silver medalist | Bronze medalist | Score in the final |
|---|---|---|---|---|---|
| 2016 Summer Olympics | Men's Singles | (United Kingdom) Andy Murray | (Argentina) Juan Martín del Potro | (Japan) Kei Nishikori | 7–5, 4–6, 6–2, 7–5 |
| 2016 Summer Olympics | Women's Singles | (Puerto Rico) Monica Puig | (Germany) Angelique Kerber | (Czech Republic) Petra Kvitová | 6–4, 4–6, 6–1 |
| 2016 Summer Olympics | Men's Doubles | (Spain) Marc López (Spain) Rafael Nadal | (Romania) Florin Mergea (Romania) Horia Tecău | (United States) Steve Johnson (United States) Jack Sock | 6–2, 3–6, 6–4 |
| 2016 Summer Olympics | Women's Doubles | (Russia) Ekaterina Makarova (Russia) Elena Vesnina | (Switzerland) Timea Bacsinszky (Switzerland) Martina Hingis | (Czech Republic) Lucie Šafářová (Czech Republic) Barbora Strýcová | 6–4, 6–4 |
| 2016 Summer Olympics | Mixed Doubles | (United States) Bethanie Mattek-Sands (United States) Jack Sock | (United States) Venus Williams (United States) Rajeev Ram | (Czech Republic) Lucie Hradecká (Czech Republic) Radek Štěpánek | 6–7^{(3–7)}, 6–1, [10–7] |

=== ATP World Tour Masters 1000 ===
- March 7 – 20: 2016 BNP Paribas Open in (United States) Indian Wells, California
  - Men's Singles: (Serbia) Novak Djokovic
  - Men's Doubles: (France) Pierre-Hugues Herbert / (France) Nicolas Mahut
- March 21 – April 3: 2016 Miami Open in the United States
  - Men's Singles: (Serbia) Novak Djokovic
  - Men's Doubles: (France) Pierre-Hugues Herbert / (France) Nicolas Mahut
- April 9 – 17: 2016 Monte-Carlo Rolex Masters in (France) Roquebrune-Cap-Martin
  - Men's Singles: (Spain) Rafael Nadal
  - Men's Doubles: (France) Pierre-Hugues Herbert / (France) Nicolas Mahut
- May 1 – 8: 2016 Mutua Madrid Open in Spain
  - Men's Singles: (Serbia) Novak Djokovic
  - Men's Doubles: (Netherlands) Jean-Julien Rojer / (Romania) Horia Tecău
- May 8 – 15: 2016 Internazionali BNL d'Italia in (Italy) Rome
  - Men's Singles: (United Kingdom) Andy Murray
  - Men's Doubles: (United States) Bob Bryan / (United States) Mike Bryan
- July 23 – 31: 2016 Rogers Cup in (Canada) Toronto
  - Men's Singles: (Serbia) Novak Djokovic
  - Men's Doubles: (Croatia) Ivan Dodig / (Brazil) Marcelo Melo
- August 13 – 21: 2016 Western & Southern Open in (United States) Mason, Ohio
  - Men's Singles: (Croatia) Marin Čilić
  - Men's Doubles: (Croatia) Ivan Dodig / (Brazil) Marcelo Melo
- October 8 – 16: 2016 Shanghai Rolex Masters in China
  - Men's Singles: (United Kingdom) Andy Murray
  - Men's Doubles: (United States) John Isner / (United States) Jack Sock
- October 29 – November 6: 2016 BNP Paribas Masters in (France) Paris (final)
  - Men's Singles: (United Kingdom) Andy Murray
  - Men's Doubles: (Finland) Henri Kontinen / (Australia) John Peers

=== ATP World Tour 500 series ===
- February 8 – 14: 2016 ABN AMRO World Tennis Tournament in (Netherlands) Rotterdam
  - Men's Singles: (Slovakia) Martin Kližan
  - Men's Doubles: (France) Nicolas Mahut / (Canada) Vasek Pospisil
- February 15 – 21: 2016 Rio Open in (Brazil) Rio de Janeiro
  - Men's Singles: (Uruguay) Pablo Cuevas
  - Men's Doubles: (Colombia) Juan Sebastián Cabal / (Colombia) Robert Farah
- February 22 – 28: 2016 Dubai Tennis Championships in the United Arab Emirates
  - Men's Singles: (Switzerland) Stan Wawrinka
  - Men's Doubles: (Italy) Simone Bolelli / (Italy) Andreas Seppi
- February 22 – 28: 2016 Abierto Mexicano Telcel in (Mexico) Acapulco
  - Men's Singles: (Austria) Dominic Thiem
  - Men's Doubles: (Philippines) Treat Huey / (Belarus) Max Mirnyi
- April 16 – 24: 2016 Barcelona Open Banc Sabadell in Spain
  - Men's Singles: (Spain) Rafael Nadal
  - Men's Doubles: (United States) Bob Bryan / (United States) Mike Bryan
- June 11 – 19: 2016 Gerry Weber Open in (Germany) Halle
  - Men's Singles: (Germany) Florian Mayer
  - Men's Doubles: (South Africa) Raven Klaasen / (United States) Rajeev Ram
- June 13 – 19: 2016 Aegon Championships in (United Kingdom) London
  - Men's Singles: (United Kingdom) Andy Murray
  - Men's Doubles: (France) Pierre-Hugues Herbert / (France) Nicolas Mahut
- July 9 – 17: 2016 German Open in (Germany) Hamburg
  - Men's Singles: (Slovakia) Martin Kližan
  - Men's Doubles: (Finland) Henri Kontinen / (Australia) John Peers
- July 16 – 24: 2016 Citi Open in (United States) Washington, D.C.
  - Men's Singles: (France) Gaël Monfils
  - Men's Doubles: (Canada) Daniel Nestor / (France) Édouard Roger-Vasselin
- October 3 – 9: 2016 China Open in Beijing
  - Men's Singles: (United Kingdom) Andy Murray
  - Men's Doubles: (Spain) Pablo Carreño Busta / (Spain) Rafael Nadal
- October 3 – 9: 2016 Rakuten Japan Open Tennis Championships in Tokyo
  - Men's Singles: (Australia) Nick Kyrgios
  - Men's Doubles: (Spain) Marcel Granollers / (Poland) Marcin Matkowski
- October 22 – 30: 2016 Erste Bank Open in (Austria) Vienna
  - Men's Singles: (United Kingdom) Andy Murray
  - Men's Doubles: (Poland) Łukasz Kubot / (Brazil) Marcelo Melo
- October 22 – 30: 2016 Swiss Indoors in (Switzerland) Basel (final)
  - Men's Singles: (Croatia) Marin Čilić
  - Men's Doubles: (Spain) Marcel Granollers / (United States) Jack Sock

=== WTA Premier tournaments ===
- January 3 – October 22: 2016 WTA Premier tournaments Events

==== Premier Mandatory ====
- March 9 – 20: 2016 BNP Paribas Open in (United States) Indian Wells, California
  - Women's Singles: (Belarus) Victoria Azarenka
  - Women's Doubles: (United States) Bethanie Mattek-Sands / (United States) Coco Vandeweghe
- March 22 – April 3: 2016 Miami Open in the United States
  - Women's Singles: (Belarus) Victoria Azarenka
  - Women's Doubles: (United States) Bethanie Mattek-Sands / (Czech Republic) Lucie Šafářová
- April 30 – May 7: 2016 Mutua Madrid Open in Spain
  - Women's Singles: (Romania) Simona Halep
  - Women's Doubles: (France) Caroline Garcia / (France) Kristina Mladenovic
- October 3 – 9: 2016 China Open in Beijing (final)
  - Women's Singles: (Poland) Agnieszka Radwańska
  - Women's Doubles: (United States) Bethanie Mattek-Sands / (Czech Republic) Lucie Šafářová

==== Premier 5 ====
- February 19 – 27: 2016 Qatar Total Open in Doha
  - Women's Singles: (Spain) Carla Suárez Navarro
  - Women's Doubles: (Chinese Taipei) Chan Hao-ching / (Chinese Taipei) Chan Yung-jan
- May 9 – 15: 2016 Internazionali BNL d'Italia in (Italy) Rome
  - Women's Singles: (United States) Serena Williams
  - Women's Doubles: (Switzerland) Martina Hingis / (India) Sania Mirza
- July 22 – 31: 2016 Rogers Cup in (Canada) Montreal
  - Women's Singles: (Romania) Simona Halep
  - Women's Doubles: (Russia) Ekaterina Makarova / (Russia) Elena Vesnina
- August 15 – 21: 2016 Western & Southern Open in (United States) Mason, Ohio
  - Women's Singles: (Czech Republic) Karolína Plíšková
  - Women's Doubles: (India) Sania Mirza / (Czech Republic) Barbora Strýcová
- September 25 – October 1: 2016 Wuhan Open in China (final)
  - Women's Singles: (Czech Republic) Petra Kvitová
  - Women's Doubles: (United States) Bethanie Mattek-Sands / (Czech Republic) Lucie Šafářová

==== Premier ====
- January 3 – 9: 2016 Brisbane International in Australia
  - Women's Singles: (Belarus) Victoria Azarenka
  - Women's Doubles: (Switzerland) Martina Hingis / (India) Sania Mirza
- January 10 – 15: 2016 Apia International Sydney in Australia
  - Women's Singles: (Russia) Svetlana Kuznetsova
  - Women's Doubles: (Switzerland) Martina Hingis / (India) Sania Mirza
- February 8 – 14: 2016 St. Petersburg Ladies' Trophy in Russia
  - Women's Singles: (Italy) Roberta Vinci
  - Women's Doubles: (Switzerland) Martina Hingis / (India) Sania Mirza
- February 15 – 20: 2016 Dubai Tennis Championships in the United Arab Emirates
  - Women's Singles: (Italy) Sara Errani
  - Women's Doubles: (Chinese Taipei) Chuang Chia-jung / (Croatia) Darija Jurak
- April 2 – 10: 2016 Volvo Car Open in (United States) Charleston, South Carolina (formerly known as the Family Circle Cup)
  - Women's Singles: (United States) Sloane Stephens
  - Women's Doubles: (France) Caroline Garcia / (France) Kristina Mladenovic
- April 16 – 24: 2016 Porsche Tennis Grand Prix in (Germany) Stuttgart
  - Women's Singles: (Germany) Angelique Kerber
  - Women's Doubles: (France) Caroline Garcia / (France) Kristina Mladenovic
- June 11 – 19: 2016 Aegon Classic in (United Kingdom) Birmingham
  - Women's Singles: (United States) Madison Keys
  - Women's Doubles: (Czech Republic) Karolína Plíšková / (Czech Republic) Barbora Strýcová
- June 18 – 25: 2016 Aegon International in (United Kingdom) Eastbourne
  - Women's Singles: (Slovakia) Dominika Cibulková
  - Women's Doubles: (Croatia) Darija Jurak / (Australia) Anastasia Rodionova
- July 18 – 24: 2016 Bank of the West Classic in (United States) Stanford, California
  - Women's Singles: (United Kingdom) Johanna Konta
  - Women's Doubles: (United States) Raquel Atawo / (United States) Abigail Spears
- August 19 – 27: 2016 Connecticut Open in (United States) New Haven, Connecticut
  - Women's Singles: (Poland) Agnieszka Radwańska
  - Women's Doubles: (India) Sania Mirza / (Romania) Monica Niculescu
- September 19 – 25: 2016 Toray Pan Pacific Open in (Japan) Tokyo
  - Women's Singles: (Denmark) Caroline Wozniacki
  - Women's Doubles: (India) Sania Mirza / (Czech Republic) Barbora Strýcová
- October 17 – 22: 2016 Kremlin Cup in (Russia) Moscow (final)
  - Women's Singles: (Russia) Svetlana Kuznetsova
  - Women's Doubles: (Czech Republic) Andrea Hlaváčková / (Czech Republic) Lucie Hradecká

=== Non ATP or WTA Championships ===
- December 31, 2015 – January 2, 2016: 2016 Mubadala World Tennis Championship in United Arab Emirates
  - In the final (Spain) Rafael Nadal def. (Canada) Milos Raonic 7–6, 6–3.

== See also ==
- 2016 ATP World Tour
- 2016 WTA Tour
- Tennis at the 2016 Summer Olympics
- 2016 ATP Challenger Tour
- 2016 WTA 125K series
- 2016 US Open Series
- 2016 International Premier Tennis League season

== International Tennis Hall of Fame ==
- Class of 2016:
  - Justine Henin, player
  - Marat Safin, player
