= 2016 WTA Premier tournaments =

The 2016 WTA Premier tournaments are 21 of the tennis tournaments on the 2016 WTA Tour. The WTA Tour is the elite tour for women's professional tennis. The WTA Premier tournaments are divided into three levels, which all rank below the Grand Slam events and above the WTA International tournaments.

== Schedule ==
=== Premier ===
Week of	Tournament	Champions	Runners-up	Semifinalists	Quarterfinalists
4 January	Brisbane International; Brisbane, Australia	(Belarus) Victoria Azarenka; 6–3, 6–1	(Germany) Angelique Kerber	(United States) Samantha Crawford (Spain) Carla Suárez Navarro	(Italy) Roberta Vinci (Germany) Andrea Petkovic (Russia) Anastasia Pavlyuchenkova (United States) Varvara Lepchenko
4 January	Brisbane International; Brisbane, Australia	(Switzerland) Martina Hingis (India) Sania Mirza; 7–5, 6–1	(Germany) Angelique Kerber (Germany) Andrea Petkovic	(United States) Samantha Crawford (Spain) Carla Suárez Navarro	(Italy) Roberta Vinci (Germany) Andrea Petkovic (Russia) Anastasia Pavlyuchenkova (United States) Varvara Lepchenko
11 January	Apia International Sydney; Sydney, Australia	(Russia) Svetlana Kuznetsova; 6–0, 6–2	(Puerto Rico) Monica Puig	(Romania) Simona Halep (Switzerland) Belinda Bencic	(Czech Republic) Karolína Plíšková (Italy) Sara Errani (Russia) Ekaterina Makarova (Australia) Samantha Stosur
11 January	Apia International Sydney; Sydney, Australia	(Switzerland) Martina Hingis (India) Sania Mirza; 1–6, 7–5, [10–5]	(France) Caroline Garcia (France) Kristina Mladenovic	(Romania) Simona Halep (Switzerland) Belinda Bencic	(Czech Republic) Karolína Plíšková (Italy) Sara Errani (Russia) Ekaterina Makarova (Australia) Samantha Stosur
8 February	St. Petersburg Ladies Trophy; St. Petersburg, Russia	(Italy) Roberta Vinci; 6–4, 6–3	(Switzerland) Belinda Bencic	(Russia) Daria Kasatkina (Serbia) Ana Ivanovic	(Russia) Anastasia Pavlyuchenkova (Slovakia) Dominika Cibulková (Ukraine) Kateryna Kozlova (Hungary) Tímea Babos
8 February	St. Petersburg Ladies Trophy; St. Petersburg, Russia	(Switzerland) Martina Hingis (India) Sania Mirza; 6–3, 6–1	(Russia) Vera Dushevina (Czech Republic) Barbora Krejčíková	(Russia) Daria Kasatkina (Serbia) Ana Ivanovic	(Russia) Anastasia Pavlyuchenkova (Slovakia) Dominika Cibulková (Ukraine) Kateryna Kozlova (Hungary) Tímea Babos
15 February	Dubai Tennis Championships; Dubai, UAE	(Italy) Sara Errani; 6–0, 6–2	(Czech Republic) Barbora Strýcová	(France) Caroline Garcia (Ukraine) Elina Svitolina	(Serbia) Ana Ivanovic (Germany) Andrea Petkovic (United States) Madison Brengle (United States) Coco Vandeweghe
15 February	Dubai Tennis Championships; Dubai, UAE	(Chinese Taipei) Chuang Chia-jung (Croatia) Darija Jurak; 6–4, 6–4	(France) Caroline Garcia (France) Kristina Mladenovic	(France) Caroline Garcia (Ukraine) Elina Svitolina	(Serbia) Ana Ivanovic (Germany) Andrea Petkovic (United States) Madison Brengle (United States) Coco Vandeweghe
4 April	Family Circle Cup; Charleston, USA	(United States) Sloane Stephens; 7–6^{(7–4)}, 6–2	(Russia) Elena Vesnina	(Germany) Angelique Kerber (Italy) Sara Errani	(Romania) Irina-Camelia Begu (Russia) Daria Kasatkina (Kazakhstan) Yulia Putintseva (Germany) Laura Siegemund
4 April	Family Circle Cup; Charleston, USA	(France) Caroline Garcia (France) Kristina Mladenovic; 6–2, 7–5	(United States) Bethanie Mattek-Sands (Czech Republic) Lucie Šafářová	(Germany) Angelique Kerber (Italy) Sara Errani	(Romania) Irina-Camelia Begu (Russia) Daria Kasatkina (Kazakhstan) Yulia Putintseva (Germany) Laura Siegemund
18 April	Porsche Tennis Grand Prix; Stuttgart, Germany	(Germany) Angelique Kerber; 6–4, 6–0	(Germany) Laura Siegemund	(Poland) Agnieszka Radwańska (Czech Republic) Petra Kvitová	(Czech Republic) Karolína Plíšková (Italy) Roberta Vinci (Spain) Garbiñe Muguruza (Spain) Carla Suárez Navarro
18 April	Porsche Tennis Grand Prix; Stuttgart, Germany	(France) Caroline Garcia (France) Kristina Mladenovic; 2–6, 6–1, [10–6]	(Switzerland) Martina Hingis (India) Sania Mirza	(Poland) Agnieszka Radwańska (Czech Republic) Petra Kvitová	(Czech Republic) Karolína Plíšková (Italy) Roberta Vinci (Spain) Garbiñe Muguruza (Spain) Carla Suárez Navarro
13 June	Aegon Classic; Birmingham, UK	(United States) Madison Keys; 6–3, 6–4	(Czech Republic) Barbora Strýcová	(United States) Coco Vandeweghe (Spain) Carla Suárez Navarro	(Belgium) Yanina Wickmayer (Bulgaria) Tsvetana Pironkova (Latvia) Jeļena Ostapenko (Germany) Angelique Kerber
13 June	Aegon Classic; Birmingham, UK	(Czech Republic) Karolína Plíšková (Czech Republic) Barbora Strýcová; 6–3, 7–6^{{7–1)}	(United States) Vania King (Russia) Alla Kudryavtseva	(United States) Coco Vandeweghe (Spain) Carla Suárez Navarro	(Belgium) Yanina Wickmayer (Bulgaria) Tsvetana Pironkova (Latvia) Jeļena Ostapenko (Germany) Angelique Kerber
20 June	Aegon International; Eastbourne, UK	(Slovakia) Dominika Cibulková; 7–5, 6–3	(Czech Republic) Karolína Plíšková	(Puerto Rico) Monica Puig (United Kingdom) Johanna Konta	(Poland) Agnieszka Radwańska (France) Kristina Mladenovic (Russia) Elena Vesnina (Russia) Ekaterina Makarova
20 June	Aegon International; Eastbourne, UK	(Croatia) Darija Jurak (Australia) Anastasia Rodionova; 5–7, 7–6^{(7–4)}, [10–6]	(Chinese Taipei) Chan Hao-ching (Chinese Taipei) Chan Yung-jan	(Puerto Rico) Monica Puig (United Kingdom) Johanna Konta	(Poland) Agnieszka Radwańska (France) Kristina Mladenovic (Russia) Elena Vesnina (Russia) Ekaterina Makarova
18 July	Bank of the West Classic; Stanford, USA	(United Kingdom) Johanna Konta; 7–5, 5–7, 6–2	(United States) Venus Williams	(United States) Alison Riske (Slovakia) Dominika Cibulková	(United States) Catherine Bellis (United States) Coco Vandeweghe (China) Zheng Saisai (Japan) Misaki Doi
18 July	Bank of the West Classic; Stanford, USA	(United States) Raquel Atawo (United States) Abigail Spears; 6–3, 6–4	(Croatia) Darija Jurak (Australia) Anastasia Rodionova	(United States) Alison Riske (Slovakia) Dominika Cibulková	(United States) Catherine Bellis (United States) Coco Vandeweghe (China) Zheng Saisai (Japan) Misaki Doi
22 August	Connecticut Open; New Haven, USA	(Poland) Agnieszka Radwańska; 6–1, 7–6^{(7–3)}	(Ukraine) Elina Svitolina	(Czech Republic) Petra Kvitová (Sweden) Johanna Larsson	(Belgium) Kirsten Flipkens (Russia) Ekaterina Makarova (Russia) Elena Vesnina (Italy) Roberta Vinci
22 August	Connecticut Open; New Haven, USA	(India) Sania Mirza (Romania) Monica Niculescu; 7–5, 6–4	(Ukraine) Kateryna Bondarenko (Chinese Taipei) Chuang Chia-jung	(Czech Republic) Petra Kvitová (Sweden) Johanna Larsson	(Belgium) Kirsten Flipkens (Russia) Ekaterina Makarova (Russia) Elena Vesnina (Italy) Roberta Vinci
19 September	Toray Pan Pacific Open; Tokyo, Japan	(Denmark) Caroline Wozniacki; 7–5, 6–3	(Japan) Naomi Osaka	(Ukraine) Elina Svitolina (Poland) Agnieszka Radwańska	(Spain) Garbiñe Muguruza (Belarus) Aliaksandra Sasnovich (Poland) Magda Linette (Puerto Rico) Monica Puig
19 September	Toray Pan Pacific Open; Tokyo, Japan	(India) Sania Mirza (Czech Republic) Barbora Strýcová; 6–1, 6–1	(China) Liang Chen (China) Yang Zhaoxuan	(Ukraine) Elina Svitolina (Poland) Agnieszka Radwańska	(Spain) Garbiñe Muguruza (Belarus) Aliaksandra Sasnovich (Poland) Magda Linette (Puerto Rico) Monica Puig
17 October	Kremlin Cup; Moscow, Russia	(Russia) Svetlana Kuznetsova; 6–2, 6–1	(Australia) Daria Gavrilova	(Ukraine) Elina Svitolina (Germany) Julia Görges	(Hungary) Tímea Babos (Croatia) Ana Konjuh (Russia) Daria Kasatkina (Russia) Anastasia Pavlyuchenkova
17 October	Kremlin Cup; Moscow, Russia	(Czech Republic) Andrea Hlaváčková (Czech Republic) Lucie Hradecká; 4–6, 6–0, [10–7]	(Australia) Daria Gavrilova (Russia) Daria Kasatkina	(Ukraine) Elina Svitolina (Germany) Julia Görges	(Hungary) Tímea Babos (Croatia) Ana Konjuh (Russia) Daria Kasatkina (Russia) Anastasia Pavlyuchenkova
