= 2016 China Open =

2016 China Open may refer to:

- 2016 China Open (tennis)
- 2016 China Open (snooker)
