= 2016 US Open Series =

In tennis, the 2016 US Open Series (known as Emirates Airline US Open Series for sponsorship reasons) was the thirteenth edition of the US Open Series, which included a group of hard court tournaments that started on July 18, 2016 in Stanford and concluded in Connecticut for the women and in Winston Salem for the men on August 27, 2016. This edition consisted of three separate men's tournaments and three women's tournaments, with the Western & Southern Open hosting both a men's and women's event. The series was headlined by two ATP World Tour Masters 1000 and two WTA Premier 5 events.

== Point distribution for series events ==
In order to be included in the final standings and subsequently the bonus prize money, a player needs to have countable results from at least two different tournaments. Starting from the 2014 season, a new rule has been added to double the points of a player who has obtained countable results in at least three tournaments.

The top three men’s and top three women’s finishers all earn bonus prize money at the US Open, with the champions of the Series Bonus Challenge having the opportunity to win $1 million in bonus prize money in Flushing Meadows.

Round	ATP Masters 1000 WTA Premier 5	ATP World Tour 250 WTA Premier
Winner	100	70
Finalist	70	45
Semifinalist	45	25
Quarterfinalist	25	15
Round of 16	15	0

== Standings ==
=== ATP ===
Rank	Nationality	Player	Tours ^{1}	Titles	Points
1	JPN	Kei Nishikori	2		85
2	BUL	Grigor Dimitrov	2		70
3	CAN	Milos Raonic	2		70
4	FRA	Gaël Monfils	2		60
4	SUI	Stan Wawrinka	2		60
6	RSA	Kevin Anderson	2		40
6	CZE	Tomáš Berdych	2		40
6	AUS	Bernard Tomic	2		40
9	ESP	Fernando Verdasco	2		30

Notes:

- 1 – Tours – Number of tournaments in US Open Series in which a player has reached the quarterfinals or better, in 250 series events, or the Round of 16 in ATP World Tour Masters 1000 events.
- # – Indicates a player has earned points in at least three Emirates Airline US Open Series events, therefore doubling his point total earned on the Series.
- In order to be counted in the final standings, a player must earn points in two or more Emirates Airline US Open Series events.

=== WTA ===
Rank	Nationality	Player	Tours ^{1}	Titles	Points
1	POL	Agnieszka Radwańska	3	1	220^{#}
2	GBR	Johanna Konta	3	1	220^{#}
3	ROU	Simona Halep	2	1	145
4	CZE	Karolína Plíšková	2	1	115
5	GER	Angelique Kerber	2		115
6	ITA	Roberta Vinci	3		90^{#}
7	UKR	Elina Svitolina	2		60
7	USA	Venus Williams	2		60
9	RUS	Svetlana Kuznetsova	2		50
10	SVK	Dominika Cibulková	2		40
10	CZE	Petra Kvitová	2		40
10	RUS	Anastasia Pavlyuchenkova	2		40
13	JPN	Misaki Doi	2		30

Notes:

- 1 – Tours – Number of tournaments in US Open Series in which a player has reached the quarterfinals or better, in Premier events; or the Round of 16 or better in Premier 5 events.
- # – Indicates a player has earned points in at least three Emirates Airline US Open Series events, therefore doubling her point total earned on the Series.
- In order to be counted in the final standings, a player must earn points in two or more Emirates Airline US Open Series events.

== Bonus prize money ==
Top three players in the 2016 US Open Series will receive bonus prize money, depending on where they finish in the 2016 US Open, according to money schedule below.

2016 Emirates Airline US Open Series Finish	2016 US Open Finish								Awardees	
2016 Emirates Airline US Open Series Finish	W	F	SF	QF	Round of 16	Round of 32	Round of 64	Round of 128	Awardees	
1st Place	$1,000,000	$500,000	$250,000	$125,000	$70,000	$40,000	$25,000	$15,000	(Japan) Kei Nishikori	$250,000
1st Place	$1,000,000	$500,000	$250,000	$125,000	$70,000	$40,000	$25,000	$15,000	(Poland) Agnieszka Radwańska	$70,000
2nd Place	$500,000	$250,000	$125,000	$62,500	$35,000	$20,000	$12,500	$7,500	(Bulgaria) Grigor Dimitrov	$35,000
2nd Place	$500,000	$250,000	$125,000	$62,500	$35,000	$20,000	$12,500	$7,500	(United Kingdom) Johanna Konta	$35,000
3rd Place	$250,000	$125,000	$62,500	$31,250	$17,500	$10,000	$6,250	$3,750	(Canada) Milos Raonic	$6,250
3rd Place	$250,000	$125,000	$62,500	$31,250	$17,500	$10,000	$6,250	$3,750	(Romania) Simona Halep	$31,250

== Tournament Schedule ==
Legend
Grand Slam Event
ATP Masters 1000 and WTA Premier 5
ATP World Tour 500 and WTA Premier
ATP World Tour 250 and WTA International

Week	Date	Men's Events	Women's Events
1	July 18 – July 24	No Series Event Held This Week	Stanford; Bank of the West Classic; 2016 Champion: (United Kingdom) Johanna Konta
2	July 25 – July 31	Toronto; Rogers Cup presented by National Bank; 2016 Champion: (Serbia) Novak Djokovic	Montreal; Rogers Cup presented by National Bank; 2016 Champion: (Romania) Simona Halep
3	August 1 – August 7	Atlanta; BB&T Atlanta Open; 2016 Champion: (Australia) Nick Kyrgios	No Series Event Held This Week
	August 8 – August 14	No Series Event Held This Week Due To 2016 Summer Olympics	
4	August 15 – August 21	Cincinnati; Western & Southern Open; 2016 Champion: (Croatia) Marin Čilić	Cincinnati; Western & Southern Open; 2016 Champion: (Czech Republic) Karolina Plíšková
5	August 22 – August 27	Winston-Salem; Winston-Salem Open; 2016 Champion: (Spain) Pablo Carreño Busta	New Haven; Connecticut Open; 2016 Champion: (Poland) Agnieszka Radwańska
6–7	August 29 – September 11	New York; US Open; 2016 Champion: (Switzerland) Stan Wawrinka	New York; US Open; 2016 Champion: (Germany) Angelique Kerber

== Week 1 ==
=== WTA – Bank of the West Classic (Stanford) ===
Angelique Kerber was the defending champion, but chose to compete in Båstad instead. Venus Williams was the number one seed. Catherine Bellis reached the quarterfinals of a WTA Premier tournament for the first time in her career, where she lost to Venus Williams.
Johanna Konta won her first WTA title, defeating Williams in the final, 7–5, 5–7, 6–2. Williams was attempting to win her 3rd title in Stanford and her 50th title overall.

==== Main Draw Finals ====
Quarterfinals
1	(United States) John Isner	7	6
8	(United States) Taylor Fritz	5	4
WC	(United States) Reilly Opelka	6	6
7	(United States) Donal Young	4	4
(Argentina) Horacio Zeballos	4	4
(Japan) Yoshihito Nishioka	6	6
5	(Spain) Fernando Verdasco	4	7^{7}	3
2	(Australia) Nick Kyrgios	6	6^{5}	6

Semifinals
1	(United States) John Isner	6^{5}	6	6
WC	(United States) Reilly Opelka	7^{7}	4	2
(Japan) Yoshihito Nishioka	3	6	3
2	(Australia) Nick Kyrgios	6	3	6

Final
1	(United States) John Isner	6^{3}	6^{4}
2	(Australia) Nick Kyrgios	7^{7}	7^{7}

== Week 2 ==
=== ATP – Rogers Cup (Toronto) ===
Andy Murray was the defending champion, but chose not to participate this year, citing a need to recover from recent tournaments.

Novak Djokovic won his 30th Masters 1000 title, defeating Kei Nishikori in the final, 6–3, 7–5. By reaching his 43rd Masters 1000 final, Djokovic broke the record he previously shared with Roger Federer and Rafael Nadal.

==== Main Draw Finals ====
Quarterfinals
1	(Serbia) Novak Djokovic	7^{8}	6
5	(Czech Republic) Tomáš Berdych	6^{6}	4
4	(Canada) Milos Raonic	4	4
10	(France) Gaël Monfils	6	6
(Bulgaria) Grigor Dimitrov	3	6	2
3	(Japan) Kei Nishikori	6	3	6
(South Africa) Kevin Anderson	1	3
2	(Switzerland) Stan Wawrinka	6	6

Semifinals
1	(Serbia) Novak Djokovic	6	6
10	(France) Gaël Monfils	3	2
3	(Japan) Kei Nishikori	7^{8}	6
2	(Switzerland) Stan Wawrinka	6^{6}	1

Final
1	(Serbia) Novak Djokovic	6	7
3	(Japan) Kei Nishikori	3	5

=== Top half ===
==== Section 1 ====
First round
PR	(Russia) D Tursunov	6^{5}	1
(Luxembourg) G Müller	7^{7}	6
WC	(Canada) P Polansky	4	6	6
Q	(United States) T Smyczek	6	3	0
Q	(Czech Republic) R Štěpánek	6	6
14	(France) B Paire	1	3
9	(United States) J Isner	4	6	6
(Israel) D Sela	6	3	2
(Russia) A Kuznetsov	3	1
Q	(United States) R Harrison	6	6
(Croatia) B Ćorić	5	6	6
(Croatia) I Dodig	7	4	2

Second round
1	(Serbia) N Djokovic	7	7^{7}
(Luxembourg) G Müller	5	6^{3}
WC	(Canada) P Polansky	6^{5}	4
Q	(Czech Republic) R Štěpánek	7^{7}	6
9	(United States) J Isner	6^{3}	7^{7}	4
Q	(United States) R Harrison	7^{7}	6^{4}	6
(Croatia) B Ćorić	6	1	4
5	(Czech Republic) T Berdych	4	6	6

Third round
1	(Serbia) N Djokovic	6	6
Q	(Czech Republic) R Štěpánek	2	4
Q	(United States) R Harrison	4	7^{7}	4
5	(Czech Republic) T Berdych	6	6^{2}	6

Quarterfinals
1	(Serbia) N Djokovic	7^{8}	6
5	(Czech Republic) T Berdych	6^{6}	4

==== Section 2 ====
First round
(Chinese Taipei) Y-h Lu	7	6
(Germany) A Zverev	5	3
(Australia) J Millman	4	3^{r}
Q	(United States) J Donaldson	6	4
(Italy) F Fognini	6	6
15	(United States) S Johnson	4	4
10	(France) G Monfils	6	6
(Portugal) J Sousa	3	3
(Canada) V Pospisil	7^{7}	0
(France) J Chardy	6^{3}	0^{r}
WC	(Canada) F Dancevic	6^{5}	4
(United States) S Querrey	7^{7}	6

Second round
4	(Canada) M Raonic	6	6
(Chinese Taipei) Y-h Lu	3	3
Q	(United States) J Donaldson	6	3	6
(Italy) F Fognini	3	6	3
10	(France) G Monfils	7^{8}	6
(Canada) V Pospisil	6^{6}	0
(United States) S Querrey	4	1^{r}
7	(Belgium) D Goffin	6	2

Third round
4	(Canada) M Raonic	6	6
Q	(United States) J Donaldson	2	3
10	(France) G Monfils	7^{7}	2	6
7	(Belgium) D Goffin	6^{5}	6	4

Quarterfinals
4	(Canada) M Raonic	4	4
10	(France) G Monfils	6	6

=== Bottom half ===
==== Section 3 ====
First round
(Croatia) I Karlović	6^{9}	7^{7}	6
(United States) T Fritz	7^{11}	6^{5}	2
(Japan) Y Sugita	7	6^{5}	4
(Bulgaria) G Dimitrov	5	7^{7}	6
WC	(Canada) D Shapovalov	7^{7}	3	6
11	(Australia) N Kyrgios	6^{2}	6	3
13	(France) L Pouille	6^{8}	6	7
Q	(Ecuador) E Gómez	7^{10}	4	5
(Latvia) E Gulbis	4	2
(United States) R Ram	6	6
Q	(United States) D Novikov	6	6
(Argentina) F Delbonis	4	3

Second round
8	(Croatia) M Čilić	4	6^{3}
(Croatia) I Karlović	6	7^{7}
(Bulgaria) G Dimitrov	6	6
WC	(Canada) D Shapovalov	4	3
13	(France) L Pouille	4	6^{5}
(United States) R Ram	6	7^{7}
Q	(United States) D Novikov	4	5
3	(Japan) K Nishikori	6	7

Third round
(Croatia) I Karlović	3	5
(Bulgaria) G Dimitrov	6	7
(United States) R Ram	3	4
3	(Japan) K Nishikori	6	6

Quarterfinals
(Bulgaria) G Dimitrov	3	6	2
3	(Japan) K Nishikori	6	3	6

==== Section 4 ====
First round
(Serbia) V Troicki	6^{4}	3
(South Africa) K Anderson	7^{7}	6
WC	(Canada) S Diez	3	6	6
(United Kingdom) K Edmund	6	3	2
Q	(Colombia) A González	4	6^{1}
12	(Australia) B Tomic	6	7^{7}
16	(United States) J Sock	6	6
(United States) D Kudla	2	2
(United States) D Young	7^{8}	6
(Ukraine) A Dolgopolov	6^{6}	4
(Russia) M Youzhny	6	7^{8}
(France) S Robert	3	6^{6}

Second round
6	(Austria) D Thiem	1^{r}
(South Africa) K Anderson	4
WC	(Canada) S Diez	3	6^{4}
12	(Australia) B Tomic	6	7^{7}
16	(United States) J Sock	6	6
(United States) D Young	4	3
(Russia) M Youzhny	6^{3}	6^{8}
2	(Switzerland) S Wawrinka	7^{7}	7^{10}

Third round
(South Africa) K Anderson	4	6	6
12	(Australia) B Tomic	6	3	4
16	(United States) J Sock	6^{3}	2
2	(Switzerland) S Wawrinka	7^{7}	6

Quarterfinals
(South Africa) K Anderson	1	3
2	(Switzerland) S Wawrinka	6	6

== Qualifying ==
=== Seeds ===
1. (Japan) Yūichi Sugita (moved to main draw)
2. (Czech Republic) Radek Štěpánek (qualified)
3. (United States) Tim Smyczek (qualified)
4. (United States) Dennis Novikov (qualified)
5. (United States) Austin Krajicek (qualifying competition)
6. (Germany) Mischa Zverev (qualifying competition)
7. (France) Vincent Millot (first round)
8. (India) Saketh Myneni (qualifying competition)
9. (United States) Jared Donaldson (qualified)
10. (Australia) Sam Groth (first round)
11. (United States) Ryan Harrison (qualified)
12. (Colombia) Alejandro González (qualified)
13. (Australia) Matthew Barton (first round)
14. (Australia) James Duckworth (qualifying competition)

=== Qualifiers ===
1. (Colombia) Alejandro González
2. (Czech Republic) Radek Štěpánek
3. (United States) Tim Smyczek
4. (United States) Dennis Novikov
5. (Ecuador) Emilio Gómez
6. (United States) Ryan Harrison
7. (United States) Jared Donaldson

=== Qualifying draw ===
==== First qualifier ====
First round
Alt	(Canada) Kelsey Stevenson	2	2
(Canada) Philip Bester	6	6
WC	(Canada) Benjamin Sigouin	6^{2}	4
12	(Colombia) Alejandro González	7^{7}	6

Qualifying competition
(Canada) Philip Bester	1	6^{4}
12	(Colombia) Alejandro González	6	7^{7}

==== Second qualifier ====
First round
2/Alt	(Czech Republic) Radek Štěpánek	6	7^{8}
Alt	(Canada) Brayden Schnur	4	6^{6}
Alt	(France) Fabrice Martin	6^{2}	2
8	(India) Saketh Myneni	7^{7}	6

Qualifying competition
2/Alt	(Czech Republic) Radek Štěpánek	7^{7}	6^{5}	6
8	(India) Saketh Myneni	6^{5}	7^{7}	4

==== Third qualifier ====
First round
3	(United States) Tim Smyczek	6	6
WC	(Canada) Jack Mingjie Lin	1	3
(Republic of Ireland) James McGee	6	3	6
10	(Australia) Sam Groth	3	6	3

Qualifying competition
3	(United States) Tim Smyczek	7	4	7
(Republic of Ireland) James McGee	5	6	5

==== Fourth qualifier ====
First round
4	(United States) Dennis Novikov	4	6	6
(Colombia) Alejandro Falla	6	4	3
(Canada) Félix Auger-Aliassime	5	6^{3}
14	(Australia) James Duckworth	7	7^{7}

Qualifying competition
4	(United States) Dennis Novikov	6	0	7^{7}
14	(Australia) James Duckworth	4	6	6^{5}

==== Fifth qualifier ====
First round
5	(United States) Austin Krajicek	6	7^{7}
(United States) Michael Mmoh	3	6^{4}
(Ecuador) Emilio Gómez	7^{7}	7
13	(Australia) Matthew Barton	6^{3}	5

Qualifying competition
5	(United States) Austin Krajicek	4	6^{8}
(Ecuador) Emilio Gómez	6	7^{10}

==== Sixth qualifier ====
First round
6	(Germany) Mischa Zverev	6	6
WC	(Canada) Pavel Krainik	2	0
(Republic of Ireland) Sam Barry	6^{5}	5
11	(United States) Ryan Harrison	7^{7}	7

Qualifying competition
6	(Germany) Mischa Zverev	7	3	3
11	(United States) Ryan Harrison	5	6	6

==== Seventh qualifier ====
First round
7	(France) Vincent Millot	6^{5}	2
(Israel) Amir Weintraub	7^{7}	6
WC	(Canada) Christian Lakoseljac	1	1
9	(United States) Jared Donaldson	6	6

Qualifying competition
(Israel) Amir Weintraub	4	3
9	(United States) Jared Donaldson	6	6

== Week 3 ==
=== ATP – BB&T Atlanta Open ===
John Isner was the three-time defending champion, but lost in the final to Nick Kyrgios, 6–7^{(3–7)}, 6–7^{(4–7)}.

==== Main Draw Finals ====
Quarterfinals
1	(United States) John Isner	7	6
8	(United States) Taylor Fritz	5	4
WC	(United States) Reilly Opelka	6	6
7	(United States) Donal Young	4	4
(Argentina) Horacio Zeballos	4	4
(Japan) Yoshihito Nishioka	6	6
5	(Spain) Fernando Verdasco	4	7^{7}	3
2	(Australia) Nick Kyrgios	6	6^{5}	6

Semifinals
1	(United States) John Isner	6^{5}	6	6
WC	(United States) Reilly Opelka	7^{7}	4	2
(Japan) Yoshihito Nishioka	3	6	3
2	(Australia) Nick Kyrgios	6	3	6

Final
1	(United States) John Isner	6^{3}	6^{4}
2	(Australia) Nick Kyrgios	7^{7}	7^{7}

== Week 4 ==
=== ATP – Western & Southern Open (Cincinnati) ===
Roger Federer was the two-time defending champion, but withdrew because of a knee injury.

Marin Čilić won his maiden Masters 1000 title by defeating Andy Murray in the final, 6–4, 7–5, ending his streak of 22-straight match wins dating back to the Queen's Club Championships.

==== Main Draw Finals ====
Quarterfinals
1	(United Kingdom) Andy Murray	6	6
(Australia) Bernard Tomic	4	4
4	(Canada) Milos Raonic	6	6
8	(Austria) Dominic Thiem	3	4
12	(Croatia) Marin Čilić	6	0
(Croatia) Borna Ćorić	2	0^{r}
(United States) Steve Johnson	6^{8}	2
(Bulgaria) Grigor Dimitrov	7^{10}	6

Semifinals
1	(United Kingdom) Andy Murray	6	6
4	(Canada) Milos Raonic	3	3
12	(Croatia) Marin Čilić	4	6	7
(Bulgaria) Grigor Dimitrov	6	3	5

Final
1	(United Kingdom) Andy Murray	4	5
12	(Croatia) Marin Čilić	6	7

=== WTA – Western & Southern Open (Cincinnati) ===
Angelique Kerber was in contention for the world No. 1 ranking, which she would have attained had she won the title. However, by losing in the final she remained No. 2.

Karolína Plíšková won her first WTA Premier singles title, defeating Kerber in the final, 6–3, 6–1.

==== Main Draw Finals ====
Quarterfinals
15	(Czech Republic) Karolína Plíšková	6	4	6
7	(Russia) Svetlana Kuznetsova	3	6	2
4	(Spain) Garbiñe Muguruza	6	6
Q	(Hungary) Tímea Babos	4	3
5	(Poland) Agnieszka Radwańska	5	1
3	(Romania) Simona Halep	7	6
9	(Spain) Carla Suárez Navarro	6	3	0
2	(Germany) Angelique Kerber	4	6	6

Semifinals
15	(Czech Republic) Karolína Plíšková	6	6
4	(Spain) Garbiñe Muguruza	1	3
3	(Romania) Simona Halep	3	4
2	(Germany) Angelique Kerber	6	6

Final
15	(Czech Republic) Karolína Plíšková	6	6
2	(Germany) Angelique Kerber	3	1

== Week 5 ==
=== ATP – Winston-Salem Open ===
Kevin Anderson was the defending champion, but lost in the second round to Jiří Veselý.

Pablo Carreño Busta won the title, defeating Roberto Bautista Agut in the final, 6–7^{(6–8)}, 7–6^{(7–1)}, 6–4.

==== Main Draw Finals ====
Quarterfinals
1	(France) Richard Gasquet	5	3
(Australia) John Millman	7	6
16	(Spain) Pablo Carreño Busta	6	6
12	(Russia) Andrey Kuznetsov	4	3
9	(Serbia) Viktor Troicki	6	4	6
15	(Spain) Fernando Verdasco	4	6	4
(Chinese Taipei) Lu Yen-hsun	3	2
2/WC	(Spain) Roberto Bautista Agut	6	6

Semifinals
(Australia) John Millman	4	6^{5}
16	(Spain) Pablo Carreño Busta	6	7^{7}
9	(Serbia) Viktor Troicki	5	7^{7}	2
2/WC	(Spain) Roberto Bautista Agut	7	6^{2}	6

Final
16	(Spain) Pablo Carreño Busta	6^{6}	7^{7}	6
2/WC	(Spain) Roberto Bautista Agut	7^{8}	6^{1}	4

=== WTA – Connecticut Open (New Haven) ===
Petra Kvitová was the two-time defending champion, but lost in the semifinals to Agnieszka Radwańska.

Agnieszka Radwańska won the title, defeating Elina Svitolina in the final, 6–1, 7–6^{(7–3)}.

==== Main Draw Finals ====
Quarterfinals
1/WC	(Poland) Agnieszka Radwańska	6	6
LL	(Belgium) Kirsten Flipkens	1	4
6	(Czech Republic) Petra Kvitová	6	6
(Russia) Ekaterina Makarova	3	1
10	(Ukraine) Elina Svitolina	6	6
(Russia) Elena Vesnina	3	1
LL	(Sweden) Johanna Larsson	7^{11}	6
2	(Italy) Roberta Vinci	6^{9}	1

Semifinals
1/WC	(Poland) Agnieszka Radwańska	6	6
6	(Czech Republic) Petra Kvitová	1	1
10	(Ukraine) Elina Svitolina	6	6
LL	(Sweden) Johanna Larsson	4	2

Final
1/WC	(Poland) Agnieszka Radwańska	6	7^{7}
10	(Ukraine) Elina Svitolina	1	6^{3}

== Weeks 6–7 ==
=== ATP – US Open (New York) ===
==== Main Draw Finals ====
Quarterfinals
1	(Serbia) Novak Djokovic	6	6	0
9	(France) Jo-Wilfried Tsonga	3	2	0^{r}
24	(France) Lucas Pouille	4	3	3
10	(France) Gaël Monfils	6	6	6
WC	(Argentina) Juan Martín del Potro	6^{5}	6	3	2
3	(Switzerland) Stan Wawrinka	7^{7}	4	6	6
6	(Japan) Kei Nishikori	1	6	4	6	7
2	(United Kingdom) Andy Murray	6	4	6	1	5

Semifinals
1	(Serbia) Novak Djokovic	6	6	3	6
10	(France) Gaël Monfils	3	2	6	2
3	(Switzerland) Stan Wawrinka	4	7	6	6
6	(Japan) Kei Nishikori	6	5	4	2

Final
1	(Serbia) Novak Djokovic	7^{7}	4	5	3
3	(Switzerland) Stan Wawrinka	6^{1}	6	7	6

=== WTA – US Open (New York) ===
==== Main Draw Finals ====
Quarterfinals
1	(United States) Serena Williams	6	4	6
5	(Romania) Simona Halep	2	6	3
(Croatia) Ana Konjuh	2	2
10	(Czech Republic) Karolína Plíšková	6	6
(Denmark) Caroline Wozniacki	6	6
(Latvia) Anastasija Sevastova	0	2
7	(Italy) Roberta Vinci	5	0
2	(Germany) Angelique Kerber	7	6

Semifinals
1	(United States) Serena Williams	2	6^{5}
10	(Czech Republic) Karolína Plíšková	6	7^{7}
(Denmark) Caroline Wozniacki	4	3
2	(Germany) Angelique Kerber	6	6

Final
10	(Czech Republic) Karolína Plíšková	3	6	4
2	(Germany) Angelique Kerber	6	4	6
