= 2016 China Open – Women's doubles =

Women's doubles
- 2016 China Open

Final
- Champions: (United States) Bethanie Mattek-Sands (Czech Republic) Lucie Šafářová
- Runners-up: (France) Caroline Garcia (France) Kristina Mladenovic
- Score: 6−4, 6−4

Events
Singles	men	women
Doubles	men	women
← 2015 ·	China Open	· 2017 →

Martina Hingis and Sania Mirza were the defending champions, but chose not to participate together. Hingis played alongside CoCo Vandeweghe, but lost in the second round to Julia Görges and Karolína Plíšková. Mirza teamed up with Barbora Strýcová, but lost in the second round to Gabriela Dabrowski and María José Martínez Sánchez.

Bethanie Mattek-Sands and Lucie Šafářová won the title, defeating Caroline Garcia and Kristina Mladenovic in the final, 6−4, 6−4.

== Seeds ==
The top four seeds received a bye into the second round.

1. (France) Caroline Garcia / (France) Kristina Mladenovic (final)
2. (Russia) Ekaterina Makarova / (Russia) Elena Vesnina (second round)
3. (Chinese Taipei) Chan Hao-ching / (Chinese Taipei) Chan Yung-jan (semifinals)
4. (India) Sania Mirza / (Czech Republic) Barbora Strýcová (second round)
5. (United States) Bethanie Mattek-Sands / (Czech Republic) Lucie Šafářová (champions)
6. (Czech Republic) Andrea Hlaváčková / (Czech Republic) Lucie Hradecká (first round)
7. (Switzerland) Martina Hingis / (United States) CoCo Vandeweghe (second round)
8. (Hungary) Tímea Babos / (Kazakhstan) Yaroslava Shvedova (second round)

== Draw ==
=== Key ===
- Q = Qualifier
- WC = Wild card
- LL = Lucky loser
- Alt = Alternate
- SE = Special exempt
- PR = Protected ranking
- ITF = ITF entry
- JE = Junior exempt
- w/o = Walkover
- r = Retired
- d = Defaulted
- SR = Special ranking

=== Finals ===
Semifinals
1	(France) Caroline Garcia (France) Kristina Mladenovic	0	6	[10]
3	(Chinese Taipei) Chan Hao-ching (Chinese Taipei) Chan Yung-jan	6	1	[6]
(Canada) Gabriela Dabrowski (Spain) María José Martínez Sánchez	6	1	[12]
5	(United States) Bethanie Mattek-Sands (Czech Republic) Lucie Šafářová	4	6	[14]

Final
1	(France) Caroline Garcia (France) Kristina Mladenovic	4	4
5	(United States) Bethanie Mattek-Sands (Czech Republic) Lucie Šafářová	6	6

=== Top half ===
First round
(China) C Liang (China) Z Yang	3	3
(Serbia) A Krunić (Czech Republic) K Siniaková	6	6
WC	(Switzerland) T Bacsinszky (Latvia) J Ostapenko	6	6
WC	(China) X You (China) L Zhu	4	2
(Ukraine) O Savchuk (China) Y Wang	3	1
8	(Hungary) T Babos (Kazakhstan) Y Shvedova	6	6
(United States) V King (Romania) M Niculescu	7	6
(China) Y Xu (China) S Zheng	5	2
(Slovenia) A Klepač (Slovenia) K Srebotnik	4	6	[10]
(United States) R Atawo (United States) A Spears	6	2	[4]
(Spain) L Arruabarrena (Georgia (country)) O Kalashnikova	4	6	[10]
6	(Czech Republic) A Hlaváčková (Czech Republic) L Hradecká	6	4	[8]

Second round
1	(France) C Garcia (France) K Mladenovic	6	2	[10]
(Serbia) A Krunić (Czech Republic) K Siniaková	0	6	[7]
WC	(Switzerland) T Bacsinszky (Latvia) J Ostapenko	7^{7}	0	[10]
8	(Hungary) T Babos (Kazakhstan) Y Shvedova	6^{3}	6	[5]
3	(Chinese Taipei) H-c Chan (Chinese Taipei) Y-j Chan	7^{8}	6
(United States) V King (Romania) M Niculescu	6^{6}	4
(Slovenia) A Klepač (Slovenia) K Srebotnik	7	5	[4]
(Spain) L Arruabarrena (Georgia (country)) O Kalashnikova	5	7	[10]

Quarterfinals
1	(France) C Garcia (France) K Mladenovic	6	6
WC	(Switzerland) T Bacsinszky (Latvia) J Ostapenko	4	3
3	(Chinese Taipei) H-c Chan (Chinese Taipei) Y-j Chan	6	6
(Spain) L Arruabarrena (Georgia (country)) O Kalashnikova	2	0

Semifinals
1	(France) C Garcia (France) K Mladenovic	0	6	[10]
3	(Chinese Taipei) H-c Chan (Chinese Taipei) Y-j Chan	6	1	[6]

=== Bottom half ===
First round
7	(Switzerland) M Hingis (United States) C Vandeweghe	6	6
(Argentina) M Irigoyen (Germany) T Maria	1	1
(Germany) J Görges (Czech Republic) Ka Plíšková	6	6
(Japan) S Aoyama (Japan) M Ninomiya	2	1
(Russia) D Kasatkina (Poland) A Rosolska	3	4
(Canada) G Dabrowski (Spain) MJ Martínez Sánchez	6	6
5	(United States) B Mattek-Sands (Czech Republic) L Šafářová	7	7^{7}
(Germany) A-L Grönefeld (Czech Republic) K Peschke	5	6^{5}
(Spain) A Parra Santonja (Australia) An Rodionova	3	1
(Ukraine) K Bondarenko (Chinese Taipei) C-j Chuang	6	6
WC	(United States) C McHale (China) S Peng	6	6
WC	(Germany) L Siegemund (Ukraine) E Svitolina	4	2

Second round
7	(Switzerland) M Hingis (United States) C Vandeweghe	4	6	[8]
(Germany) J Görges (Czech Republic) Ka Plíšková	6	3	[10]
(Canada) G Dabrowski (Spain) MJ Martínez Sánchez	4	6	[10]
4	(India) S Mirza (Czech Republic) B Strýcová	6	1	[4]
5	(United States) B Mattek-Sands (Czech Republic) L Šafářová	6	6
(Ukraine) K Bondarenko (Chinese Taipei) C-j Chuang	1	4
WC	(United States) C McHale (China) S Peng	6	6
2	(Russia) E Makarova (Russia) E Vesnina	3	1

Quarterfinals
(Germany) J Görges (Czech Republic) Ka Plíšková	4	4
(Canada) G Dabrowski (Spain) MJ Martínez Sánchez	6	6
5	(United States) B Mattek-Sands (Czech Republic) L Šafářová	6	6
WC	(United States) C McHale (China) S Peng	4	2

Semifinals
(Canada) G Dabrowski (Spain) MJ Martínez Sánchez	6	1	[12]
5	(United States) B Mattek-Sands (Czech Republic) L Šafářová	4	6	[14]
