= 2016 China Open – Women's singles =

Women's singles
- 2016 China Open

Final
- Champion: (Poland) Agnieszka Radwańska
- Runner-up: (United Kingdom) Johanna Konta
- Score: 6–4, 6–2

Details
- Seeds: 16

Events
Singles	men	women
Doubles	men	women
- China Open

Agnieszka Radwańska defeated Johanna Konta 6–4, 6–2 in the final, to win her second China Open title. It was Radwańska's 20th and last singles crown before her retirement in 2018.

Garbiñe Muguruza was the defending champion, but lost in the third round to Petra Kvitová.

== Seeds ==
1. (Germany) Angelique Kerber (third round)
2. (Spain) Garbiñe Muguruza (third round)
3. (Poland) Agnieszka Radwańska (champion)
4. (Romania) Simona Halep (third round)
5. (Czech Republic) Karolína Plíšková (third round)
6. (United States) Venus Williams (first round)
7. (Spain) Carla Suárez Navarro (first round)
8. (United States) Madison Keys (semifinals)

9. (Russia) Svetlana Kuznetsova (third round)
10. (Slovakia) Dominika Cibulková (second round)
11. (United Kingdom) Johanna Konta (final)
12. (Switzerland) Timea Bacsinszky (second round)
13. (Italy) Roberta Vinci (second round)
14. (Czech Republic) Petra Kvitová (quarterfinals)
15. (Russia) Anastasia Pavlyuchenkova (first round)
16. (Ukraine) Elina Svitolina (semifinals)

Click on the seed number of a player to go to their draw section.

The four Wuhan semifinalists received a bye into the second round. They were as follows:

- (Slovakia) Dominika Cibulková
- (Romania) Simona Halep
- (Russia) Svetlana Kuznetsova
- (Czech Republic) Petra Kvitová

== Draw ==
Key

- Q = Qualifier
- WC = Wild card
- LL = Lucky loser
- Alt = Alternate
- ITF = ITF entry
- PR = Protected ranking
- SR = Special ranking
- SE = Special exempt
- JE = Junior exempt
- JR = Junior Accelerator Programme entrant
- CO = College Accelerator Programme entrant
- NG = Next Gen Accelerator Program entrant
- w/o = Walkover
- r = Retired
- d = Defaulted

=== Finals ===
Quarterfinals
16	(Ukraine) Elina Svitolina	7^{7}	6
(Australia) Daria Gavrilova	6^{3}	1
3	(Poland) Agnieszka Radwańska	6	6
(Kazakhstan) Yaroslava Shvedova	1	2
11	(United Kingdom) Johanna Konta	6	6
(China) Zhang Shuai	4	0
8	(United States) Madison Keys	6	6^{2}	7^{7}
14	(Czech Republic) Petra Kvitová	3	7^{7}	6^{5}

Semifinals
16	(Ukraine) Elina Svitolina	6^{3}	3
3	(Poland) Agnieszka Radwańska	7^{7}	6
11	(United Kingdom) Johanna Konta	7^{7}	4	6
8	(United States) Madison Keys	6^{1}	6	4

Final
3	(Poland) Agnieszka Radwańska	6	6
11	(United Kingdom) Johanna Konta	4	2

=== Top half ===
==== Section 1 ====
First round
1	(Germany) A Kerber	6	6
Q	(Czech Republic) K Siniaková	4	4
(Czech Republic) B Strýcová	5	7	7
(Germany) L Siegemund	7	5	5
(Croatia) M Lučić-Baroni	2	2
WC	(Germany) S Lisicki	6	6
Q	(Germany) T Maria	2	2
16	(Ukraine) E Svitolina	6	6
12	(Switzerland) T Bacsinszky	4	6	6
Q	(Spain) L Arruabarrena	6	4	1
(United States) C McHale	4	4
(Australia) D Gavrilova	6	6
(France) C Garcia	4	6	6
Q	(Germany) J Görges	6	3	4
WC	(China) S Peng	7	6
6	(United States) V Williams	5	1

Second round
1	(Germany) A Kerber	6	7^{7}
(Czech Republic) B Strýcová	3	6^{4}
WC	(Germany) S Lisicki	4	4
16	(Ukraine) E Svitolina	6	6
12	(Switzerland) T Bacsinszky	6	0	4
(Australia) D Gavrilova	4	6	6
(France) C Garcia	6	3	7^{7}
WC	(China) S Peng	3	6	6^{4}

Third round
1	(Germany) A Kerber	3	5
16	(Ukraine) E Svitolina	6	7
(Australia) D Gavrilova	6	6
(France) C Garcia	4	3

Quarterfinals
16	(Ukraine) E Svitolina	7^{7}	6
(Australia) D Gavrilova	6^{3}	1

==== Section 2 ====
First round
3	(Poland) A Radwańska	6	6
WC	(China) Q Wang	2	2
(Russia) E Vesnina	2	1
(Russia) E Makarova	6	6
(Denmark) C Wozniacki	6	2	6
(United States) C Vandeweghe	1	6	4
WC	(China) S Zheng	0	6	3
13	(Italy) R Vinci	6	3	6
(France) A Cornet	4	6	6
(United States) S Rogers	6	2	2
(Germany) A Beck	3	2
(Switzerland) B Bencic	6	6
(Kazakhstan) Y Shvedova	6	6
7	(Spain) C Suárez Navarro	1	3

Second round
3	(Poland) A Radwańska	6	6
(Russia) E Makarova	3	4
(Denmark) C Wozniacki	6	6
13	(Italy) R Vinci	3	2
10	(Slovakia) D Cibulková	2	7	2
(France) A Cornet	6	5	6
(Switzerland) B Bencic	4	6^{4}
(Kazakhstan) Y Shvedova	6	7^{7}

Third round
3	(Poland) A Radwańska	6	6
(Denmark) C Wozniacki	3	1
(France) A Cornet	2	4
(Kazakhstan) Y Shvedova	6	6

Quarterfinals
3	(Poland) A Radwańska	6	6
(Kazakhstan) Y Shvedova	1	2

=== Bottom half ===
==== Section 3 ====
First round
5	(Czech Republic) Ka Plíšková	6^{7}	6	6
(Czech Republic) L Šafářová	7^{9}	1	4
Q	(United States) L Chirico	2	1
(Russia) D Kasatkina	6	6
(Montenegro) D Kovinić	1	2
(Hungary) T Babos	6	6
(Latvia) A Sevastova	1	1
11	(United Kingdom) J Konta	6	6
15	(Russia) A Pavlyuchenkova	6^{4}	1
Q	(United States) A Riske	7^{7}	6
(Australia) S Stosur	1	2
(China) S Zhang	6	6
(Puerto Rico) M Puig	2	0
(Belgium) Y Wickmayer	6	6

Second round
5	(Czech Republic) Ka Plíšková	3	7	7^{9}
(Russia) D Kasatkina	6	5	6^{7}
(Hungary) T Babos	5	2
11	(United Kingdom) J Konta	7	6
Q	(United States) A Riske	3	6	6^{4}
(China) S Zhang	6	4	7^{7}
(Belgium) Y Wickmayer	2	2
4	(Romania) S Halep	6	6

Third round
5	(Czech Republic) Ka Plíšková	1	6	6^{2}
11	(United Kingdom) J Konta	6	3	7^{7}
(China) S Zhang	6	6
4	(Romania) S Halep	0	3

Quarterfinals
11	(United Kingdom) J Konta	6	6
(China) S Zhang	4	0

==== Section 4 ====
First round
8	(United States) M Keys	6	4	6
WC	(China) Y Duan	0	6	1
(France) K Mladenovic	6	5	7^{7}
(Serbia) J Janković	3	7	6^{4}
Q	(United States) N Gibbs	5	2
(Japan) M Doi	7	6
Q	(China) Y Wang	6	6
(United States) M Brengle	2	2
(Latvia) J Ostapenko	1	6	5
(Kazakhstan) Y Putintseva	6	3	7
(Romania) I-C Begu	6	2	3
2	(Spain) G Muguruza	2	6	6

Second round
8	(United States) M Keys	7	6
(France) K Mladenovic	5	4
(Japan) M Doi	1	5
9	(Russia) S Kuznetsova	6	7
14	(Czech Republic) P Kvitová	6	6
Q	(China) Y Wang	4	1
(Kazakhstan) Y Putintseva	2	6^{5}
2	(Spain) G Muguruza	6	7^{7}

Third round
8	(United States) M Keys	7^{7}	6
9	(Russia) S Kuznetsova	6^{2}	2
14	(Czech Republic) P Kvitová	6	6
2	(Spain) G Muguruza	1	4

Quarterfinals
8	(United States) M Keys	6	6^{2}	7^{7}
14	(Czech Republic) P Kvitová	3	7^{7}	6^{5}

== Qualifying ==
=== Seeds ===
1. (Japan) Naomi Osaka (first round)
2. (Romania) Monica Niculescu (qualifying competition)
3. (Croatia) Ana Konjuh (first round)
4. (Czech Republic) Kateřina Siniaková (qualified)
5. (United States) Alison Riske (qualified)
6. (Spain) Lara Arruabarrena (qualified)
7. (Germany) Julia Görges (qualified)
8. (Ukraine) Kateryna Bondarenko (first round)
9. (France) Pauline Parmentier (first round)
10. (United States) Louisa Chirico (qualified)
11. (United States) Nicole Gibbs (qualified)
12. (United Kingdom) Heather Watson (first round)
13. (Japan) Kurumi Nara (qualifying competition)
14. (United States) Vania King (qualifying competition)
15. (United States) Varvara Lepchenko (qualifying competition)
16. (Russia) Evgeniya Rodina (qualifying competition)

=== Qualifiers ===
1. (Germany) Tatjana Maria
2. (United States) Louisa Chirico
3. (China) Wang Yafan
4. (Czech Republic) Kateřina Siniaková
5. (United States) Alison Riske
6. (Spain) Lara Arruabarrena
7. (Germany) Julia Görges
8. (United States) Nicole Gibbs

=== Draw ===
==== First qualifier ====
First round
1	(Japan) Naomi Osaka	2	1
(Germany) Tatjana Maria	6	6
Alt	(Czech Republic) Lucie Hradecká	6	6
12	(United Kingdom) Heather Watson	4	4

Qualifying competition
(Germany) Tatjana Maria	6	6
Alt	(Czech Republic) Lucie Hradecká	4	3

==== Second qualifier ====
First round
2	(Romania) Monica Niculescu	6	6
(Russia) Elizaveta Kulichkova	4	1
WC	(China) Zhu Lin	3	6	3
10	(United States) Louisa Chirico	6	4	6

Qualifying competition
2	(Romania) Monica Niculescu	6	2	3
10	(United States) Louisa Chirico	2	6	6

==== Third qualifier ====
First round
3	(Croatia) Ana Konjuh	6	4	0
(China) Wang Yafan	4	6	6
(Greece) Maria Sakkari	6	4	6
9	(France) Pauline Parmentier	4	6	3

Qualifying competition
(China) Wang Yafan	6	4	6
(Greece) Maria Sakkari	4	6	4

==== Fourth qualifier ====
First round
4	(Czech Republic) Kateřina Siniaková	3
(Slovakia) Jana Čepelová	0^{r}
(Belarus) Aliaksandra Sasnovich	1	6	3
15	(United States) Varvara Lepchenko	6	3	6

Qualifying competition
4	(Czech Republic) Kateřina Siniaková	2	7^{7}	7^{7}
15	(United States) Varvara Lepchenko	6	6^{2}	6^{4}

==== Fifth qualifier ====
First round
5	(United States) Alison Riske	6	6
WC	(China) Yang Zhaoxuan	2	4
(Serbia) Aleksandra Krunić	6	5	4
13	(Japan) Kurumi Nara	4	7	6

Qualifying competition
5	(United States) Alison Riske	7^{7}	6
13	(Japan) Kurumi Nara	6^{1}	4

==== Sixth qualifier ====
First round
6	(Spain) Lara Arruabarrena	6	7^{7}
(China) Zhang Kailin	2	6^{0}
WC	(China) Ma Shuyue	1	1
14	(United States) Vania King	6	6

Qualifying competition
6	(Spain) Lara Arruabarrena	7	5	6
14	(United States) Vania King	5	7	3

==== Seventh qualifier ====
First round
7	(Germany) Julia Görges	6	6
WC	(China) Xu Shilin	1	1
(United States) Samantha Crawford	4	5
16	(Russia) Evgeniya Rodina	6	7

Qualifying competition
7	(Germany) Julia Görges	6	6
16	(Russia) Evgeniya Rodina	4	2

==== Eighth qualifier ====
First round
8	(Ukraine) Kateryna Bondarenko	6	6^{5}	4
(China) Han Xinyun	2	7^{7}	6
(Poland) Magda Linette	1	2
11	(United States) Nicole Gibbs	6	6

Qualifying competition
(China) Han Xinyun	2	4
11	(United States) Nicole Gibbs	6	6
