= 2016 Rakuten Japan Open Tennis Championships – Doubles =

Doubles
- 2016 Rakuten Japan Open Tennis Championships

Final
- Champions: (Spain) Marcel Granollers (Poland) Marcin Matkowski
- Runners-up: (South Africa) Raven Klaasen (United States) Rajeev Ram
- Score: 6–2, 7–6^{(7–4)}

Details
- Draw: 16 (1Q / 2WC)
- Seeds: 4

Events
Singles	Doubles
- Japan Open

Raven Klaasen and Marcelo Melo were the defending champions, but Melo chose to play in Beijing instead.

Klaasen played alongside Rajeev Ram, but lost in the final to Marcel Granollers and Marcin Matkowski, 2–6, 6–7^{(4–7)}.

== Seeds ==
1. (United Kingdom) Jamie Murray / (Brazil) Bruno Soares (quarterfinals)
2. (South Africa) Raven Klaasen / (United States) Rajeev Ram (final)
3. (United Kingdom) Dominic Inglot / (Netherlands) Jean-Julien Rojer (quarterfinals)
4. (Finland) Henri Kontinen / (Australia) John Peers (first round)

== Draw ==
Key

- Q = Qualifier
- WC = Wild card
- LL = Lucky loser
- Alt = Alternate
- ITF = ITF entry
- PR = Protected ranking
- SR = Special ranking
- SE = Special exempt
- JE = Junior exempt
- JR = Junior Accelerator Programme entrant
- CO = College Accelerator Programme entrant
- NG = Next Gen Accelerator Program entrant
- w/o = Walkover
- r = Retired
- d = Defaulted

=== Draw ===
First round
1	(United Kingdom) J Murray (Brazil) B Soares	6	6
(Slovakia) M Klizan (Portugal) J Sousa	4	1
(Colombia) JS Cabal (Colombia) R Farah	6	6
WC	(Japan) T Daniel (Japan) Y Uchiyama	4	2
3	(United Kingdom) D Inglot (Netherlands) J-J Rojer	6	6
(France) B Paire (Canada) V Pospisil	3	3
(Spain) M Granollers (Poland) M Matkowski	4	3
PR	(Spain) F López (Argentina) J Mónaco	6	3^{r}
(Pakistan) A-u-H Qureshi (France) G Simon	1	6	[13]
(Austria) O Marach (France) F Martin	6	4	[11]
(Sweden) R Lindstedt (Austria) A Peya	6^{5}	6	[14]
4	(Finland) H Kontinen (Australia) J Peers	7^{7}	3	[12]
WC	(Japan) A Santillan (Japan) Y Watanuki	2	2
(Czech Republic) T Berdych (Czech Republic) R Štěpánek	6	6
Q	(United States) N Monroe (New Zealand) A Sitak	4	2
2	(South Africa) R Klaasen (United States) R Ram	6	6

Quarterfinals
1	(United Kingdom) J Murray (Brazil) B Soares	6	6^{5}	[8]
(Colombia) JS Cabal (Colombia) R Farah	1	7^{7}	[10]
3	(United Kingdom) D Inglot (Netherlands) J-J Rojer	6^{6}	6	[7]
(Spain) M Granollers (Poland) M Matkowski	7^{8}	3	[10]
(Pakistan) A-u-H Qureshi (France) G Simon	6	6
(Sweden) R Lindstedt (Austria) A Peya	2	2
(Czech Republic) T Berdych (Czech Republic) R Štěpánek
2	(South Africa) R Klaasen (United States) R Ram	w/o

Semifinals
(Colombia) JS Cabal (Colombia) R Farah	6^{2}	5
(Spain) M Granollers (Poland) M Matkowski	7^{7}	7
(Pakistan) A-u-H Qureshi (France) G Simon	3	4
2	(South Africa) R Klaasen (United States) R Ram	6	6

Final
(Spain) M Granollers (Poland) M Matkowski	6	7^{7}
2	(South Africa) R Klaasen (United States) R Ram	2	6^{4}

== Qualifying ==
=== Seeds ===
1. (United Kingdom) Colin Fleming / (United States) Scott Lipsky (qualifying competition)
2. (United States) Nicholas Monroe / (New Zealand) Artem Sitak (qualified)

=== Qualifiers ===
1. (United States) Nicholas Monroe / (New Zealand) Artem Sitak

=== Qualifying draw ===
First round
1	(United Kingdom) Colin Fleming (United States) Scott Lipsky	6	6^{4}	[10]
(United States) Taylor Fritz (United States) Ryan Harrison	3	7^{7}	[4]
WC	(Japan) Yuya Kibi (Japan) Toshihide Matsui	6^{5}	1
2	(United States) Nicholas Monroe (New Zealand) Artem Sitak	7^{7}	6

Qualifying competition
1	(United Kingdom) Colin Fleming (United States) Scott Lipsky	6^{10}	6^{0}
2	(United States) Nicholas Monroe (New Zealand) Artem Sitak	7^{12}	7^{7}
