= 2016 German Open – Doubles =

Doubles
- 2016 German Open

Final
- Champions: (Finland) Henri Kontinen (Australia) John Peers
- Runners-up: (Canada) Daniel Nestor (Pakistan) Aisam-ul-Haq Qureshi
- Score: 7–5, 6–3

Details
- Draw: 16
- Seeds: 4

Events
Singles	Doubles
- German Open Tennis Championships

Jamie Murray and John Peers were the defending champions, but Murray chose to participate in the Davis Cup quarterfinals instead. Peers played alongside Henri Kontinen and successfully defended the title, defeating Daniel Nestor and Aisam-ul-Haq Qureshi in the final, 7–5, 6–3.

== Seeds ==
1. (Poland) Łukasz Kubot / (Austria) Alexander Peya (quarterfinals)
2. (Finland) Henri Kontinen / (Australia) John Peers (champions)
3. (Canada) Daniel Nestor / (Pakistan) Aisam-ul-Haq Qureshi (final)
4. (Croatia) Mate Pavić / (New Zealand) Michael Venus (first round)

== Draw ==
Key

- Q = Qualifier
- WC = Wild card
- LL = Lucky loser
- Alt = Alternate
- ITF = ITF entry
- PR = Protected ranking
- SR = Special ranking
- SE = Special exempt
- JE = Junior exempt
- JR = Junior Accelerator Programme entrant
- CO = College Accelerator Programme entrant
- NG = Next Gen Accelerator Program entrant
- w/o = Walkover
- r = Retired
- d = Defaulted

=== Draw ===
First round
1	(Poland) Ł Kubot (Austria) A Peya	6	6
WC	(Germany) A Zverev (Germany) M Zverev	0	2
(France) P-H Mathieu (France) B Paire	7^{7}	0	[5]
(Argentina) G Durán (Israel) J Erlich	6^{4}	6	[10]
3	(Canada) D Nestor (Pakistan) A-u-H Qureshi	6	6
LL	(Germany) D Masur (Germany) C-M Stebe	2	1
(United Kingdom) C Fleming (Poland) M Fyrstenberg	6^{5}	6	[10]
(Spain) N Almagro (Argentina) M González	7^{7}	3	[8]
WC	(Germany) A Begemann (Germany) J-L Struff	7	5	[7]
(Austria) O Marach (France) F Martin	5	7	[10]
(France) J Chardy (France) S Robert	6	6
4	(Croatia) M Pavić (New Zealand) M Venus	4	3
Q	(France) K de Schepper (France) A Michon	6^{4}	6^{5}
(Spain) Í Cervantes (Argentina) L Mayer	7^{7}	7^{7}
(Argentina) C Berlocq (Uruguay) P Cuevas	6^{2}	4
2	(Finland) H Kontinen (Australia) J Peers	7^{7}	6

Quarterfinals
1	(Poland) Ł Kubot (Austria) A Peya	2	6^{2}
(Argentina) G Durán (Israel) J Erlich	6	7^{7}
3	(Canada) D Nestor (Pakistan) A-u-H Qureshi	6	4	[10]
(United Kingdom) C Fleming (Poland) M Fyrstenberg	3	6	[2]
(Austria) O Marach (France) F Martin	6	3	[10]
(France) J Chardy (France) S Robert	3	6	[3]
(Spain) Í Cervantes (Argentina) L Mayer	3	2
2	(Finland) H Kontinen (Australia) J Peers	6	6

Semifinals
(Argentina) G Durán (Israel) J Erlich	4	1
3	(Canada) D Nestor (Pakistan) A-u-H Qureshi	6	6
(Austria) O Marach (France) F Martin	3	4
2	(Finland) H Kontinen (Australia) J Peers	6	6

Final
3	(Canada) D Nestor (Pakistan) A-u-H Qureshi	5	3
2	(Finland) H Kontinen (Australia) J Peers	7	6

== Qualifying ==
=== Seeds ===
1. (Argentina) Guido Andreozzi / (Argentina) Nicolás Kicker (first round)
2. (Czech Republic) Jan Mertl / (Czech Republic) Jan Šátral (first round)

=== Qualifiers ===
1. (France) Kenny de Schepper / (France) Axel Michon

=== Lucky losers ===
1. (Germany) Daniel Masur / (Germany) Cedrik-Marcel Stebe

=== Qualifying draw ===
First round
1	(Argentina) Guido Andreozzi (Argentina) Nicolás Kicker	4	6	[7]
WC	(Germany) Daniel Masur (Germany) Cedrik-Marcel Stebe	6	4	[10]
(France) Kenny de Schepper (France) Axel Michon	7^{7}	6^{1}	[10]
2	(Czech Republic) Jan Mertl (Czech Republic) Jan Šátral	6^{5}	7^{7}	[8]

Qualifying competition
WC	(Germany) Daniel Masur (Germany) Cedrik-Marcel Stebe	4	1
(France) Kenny de Schepper (France) Axel Michon	6	6
