= 2016 China Open – Men's singles =

Men's singles
- 2016 China Open

Final
- Champion: (United Kingdom) Andy Murray
- Runner-up: (Bulgaria) Grigor Dimitrov
- Score: 6–4, 7–6^{(7–2)}

Events
Singles	men	women
Doubles	men	women
← 2015 ·	China Open	· 2017 →

Andy Murray defeated Grigor Dimitrov in the final, 6–4, 7–6^{(7–2)} to win the men's singles tennis title at the 2016 China Open.

Novak Djokovic was the four-time reigning champion, but withdrew with an elbow injury before the tournament.

== Seeds ==
1. (United Kingdom) Andy Murray (champion)
2. (Spain) Rafael Nadal (quarterfinals)
3. (Canada) Milos Raonic (semifinals, withdrew)
4. (Austria) Dominic Thiem (first round)
5. (Spain) David Ferrer (semifinals)
6. (France) Lucas Pouille (second round)
7. (Spain) Roberto Bautista Agut (second round)
8. (France) Richard Gasquet (second round)

== Draw ==
=== Key ===
- Q = Qualifier
- WC = Wild card
- LL = Lucky loser
- Alt = Alternate
- SE = Special exempt
- PR = Protected ranking
- ITF = ITF entry
- JE = Junior exempt
- w/o = Walkover
- r = Retired
- d = Defaulted
- SR = Special ranking

=== Finals ===
Semifinals
1	(United Kingdom) Andy Murray	6	6
5	(Spain) David Ferrer	2	3
3	(Canada) Milos Raonic
(Bulgaria) Grigor Dimitrov	w/o

Final
1	(United Kingdom) Andy Murray	6	7^{7}
(Bulgaria) Grigor Dimitrov	4	6^{2}

=== Top half ===
First round
1	(United Kingdom) A Murray	6	7
(Italy) A Seppi	2	5
Q	(Russia) K Kravchuk	1	4
(Russia) A Kuznetsov	6	6
(Spain) G García-López	3	2
Q	(United Kingdom) K Edmund	6	6
Q	(Australia) J Millman	4	6	3
7	(Spain) R Bautista Agut	6	3	6
4/WC	(Austria) D Thiem	6	1	3
(Germany) A Zverev	4	6	6
(United States) J Sock	6	7
WC	(China) Z Zhang	3	5
(Serbia) V Troicki	6	2	5
(Italy) F Fognini	2	6	7
(Uruguay) P Cuevas	4	6^{3}
5	(Spain) D Ferrer	6	7^{7}

Second round
1	(United Kingdom) A Murray	6	6
(Russia) A Kuznetsov	2	1
Q	(United Kingdom) K Edmund	6	4	6
7	(Spain) R Bautista Agut	4	6	4
(Germany) A Zverev	6	6
(United States) J Sock	4	2
(Italy) F Fognini	3	4
5	(Spain) D Ferrer	6	6

Quarterfinals
1	(United Kingdom) A Murray	7^{11}	6
Q	(United Kingdom) K Edmund	6^{9}	2
(Germany) A Zverev	7^{7}	1	5
5	(Spain) D Ferrer	6^{4}	6	7

Semifinals
1	(United Kingdom) A Murray	6	6
5	(Spain) D Ferrer	2	3

=== Bottom half ===
First round
8	(France) R Gasquet	2	6	6
(United States) S Querrey	6	3	2
(Spain) P Carreño Busta	6	6
(Australia) B Tomic	3	1
(Argentina) G Pella	4	4
(Tunisia) M Jaziri	6	6
PR	(Germany) F Mayer	4	6^{1}
3	(Canada) M Raonic	6	7^{7}
6	(France) L Pouille	6	6
WC	(Chinese Taipei) Y-h Lu	1	2
(Bulgaria) G Dimitrov	7	6^{9}	6
(United States) S Johnson	5	7^{11}	4
(Spain) A Ramos-Viñolas	3	6	3
Q	(France) A Mannarino	6	4	6
(Italy) P Lorenzi	1	1
2	(Spain) R Nadal	6	6

Second round
8	(France) R Gasquet	7	4	1
(Spain) P Carreño Busta	5	6	6
(Tunisia) M Jaziri	3	4
3	(Canada) M Raonic	6	6
6	(France) L Pouille	7^{7}	6^{0}	4
(Bulgaria) G Dimitrov	6^{3}	7^{7}	6
Q	(France) A Mannarino	1	6^{6}
2	(Spain) R Nadal	6	7^{8}

Quarterfinals
(Spain) P Carreño Busta	4	4
3	(Canada) M Raonic	6	6
(Bulgaria) G Dimitrov	6	6
2	(Spain) R Nadal	2	4

Semifinals
3	(Canada) M Raonic
(Bulgaria) G Dimitrov	w/o

== Qualifying ==
=== Seeds ===
1. (United Kingdom) Kyle Edmund (qualified)
2. (France) Adrian Mannarino (qualified)
3. (Australia) John Millman (qualified)
4. (Argentina) Diego Schwartzman (first round)
5. (Serbia) Dušan Lajović (first round)
6. (Spain) Íñigo Cervantes (qualifying competition)
7. (Kazakhstan) Mikhail Kukushkin (first round)
8. (Czech Republic) Lukáš Rosol (first round)

=== Qualifiers ===
1. (United Kingdom) Kyle Edmund
2. (France) Adrian Mannarino
3. (Australia) John Millman
4. (Russia) Konstantin Kravchuk

=== Qualifying draw ===
==== First qualifier ====
First round
1	(United Kingdom) Kyle Edmund	6	6
WC	(Spain) Pablo Andújar	3	2
(Russia) Evgeny Donskoy	6	6
7	(Kazakhstan) Mikhail Kukushkin	4	1

Qualifying competition
1	(United Kingdom) Kyle Edmund	7^{7}	6
(Russia) Evgeny Donskoy	6^{2}	4

==== Second qualifier ====
First round
2	(France) Adrian Mannarino	6	4	6
(Italy) Thomas Fabbiano	3	6	1
(Germany) Mischa Zverev	7	2	6
8	(Czech Republic) Lukáš Rosol	5	6	4

Qualifying competition
2	(France) Adrian Mannarino	6	6
(Germany) Mischa Zverev	4	0

==== Third qualifier ====
First round
3	(Australia) John Millman	6	6
WC	(China) Wu Di	2	4
(Georgia (country)) Nikoloz Basilashvili	6^{4}	7	6
5	(Serbia) Dušan Lajović	7^{7}	5	4

Qualifying competition
3	(Australia) John Millman	6^{6}	6	6
(Georgia (country)) Nikoloz Basilashvili	7^{8}	1	4

==== Fourth qualifier ====
First round
4	(Argentina) Diego Schwartzman	4	6	6^{3}
(Russia) Konstantin Kravchuk	6	2	7^{7}
WC	(China) Li Zhe	3	2
6	(Spain) Íñigo Cervantes	6	6

Qualifying competition
(Russia) Konstantin Kravchuk	6^{2}	7^{7}	6
6	(Spain) Íñigo Cervantes	7^{7}	6^{5}	3
