= 2016 Rakuten Japan Open Tennis Championships – Singles =

Singles
- 2016 Rakuten Japan Open Tennis Championships

Final
- Champion: (Australia) Nick Kyrgios
- Runner-up: (Belgium) David Goffin
- Score: 4−6, 6−3, 7−5

Details
- Draw: 32 (4Q / 3WC)
- Seeds: 8

Events
Singles	Doubles
← 2015 ·	Japan Open	· 2017 →

Stan Wawrinka was the defending champion, but withdrew before the tournament began after suffering a back injury.

Nick Kyrgios won the title, defeating David Goffin in the final, 4−6, 6−3, 7−5. This was his first ATP 500 level title and his third title overall in the 2016 ATP World Tour.

== Seeds ==
1. (Japan) Kei Nishikori (second round, retired)
2. (France) Gaël Monfils (semifinals)
3. (Czech Republic) Tomáš Berdych (first round)
4. (Croatia) Marin Čilić (semifinals)
5. (Belgium) David Goffin (final)
6. (Australia) Nick Kyrgios (champion)
7. (Croatia) Ivo Karlović (quarterfinals)
8. (Spain) Feliciano López (first round, retired)

== Draw ==
=== Key ===
- Q = Qualifier
- WC = Wild card
- LL = Lucky loser
- Alt = Alternate
- SE = Special exempt
- PR = Protected ranking
- ITF = ITF entry
- JE = Junior exempt
- w/o = Walkover
- r = Retired
- d = Defaulted
- SR = Special ranking

=== Finals ===
Semifinals
5	(Belgium) David Goffin	7	6
4	(Croatia) Marin Čilić	5	4
6	(Australia) Nick Kyrgios	6	6
2	(France) Gaël Monfils	4	4

Final
5	(Belgium) David Goffin	6	3	5
6	(Australia) Nick Kyrgios	4	6	7

=== Top half ===
First round
1	(Japan) K Nishikori	4	6	6
LL	(United States) D Young	6	2	2
(Slovakia) M Kližan	6	3	3
(Portugal) J Sousa	4	6	6
(Czech Republic) J Veselý	3	6	6
(South Africa) K Anderson	6	0	4
WC	(Japan) Y Nishioka	5	2
5	(Belgium) D Goffin	7	6
4	(Croatia) M Čilić	6	4	6
(France) B Paire	0	6	3
Q	(Japan) G Soeda	7^{7}	3	3
(Spain) F Verdasco	6^{2}	6	6
PR	(Argentina) J Mónaco	7^{7}	7^{7}
(United States) T Fritz	6^{2}	6^{5}
Q	(Australia) J Duckworth	6^{5}	7^{7}	4
8	(Spain) F López	7^{7}	6^{4}	2^{r}

Second round
1	(Japan) K Nishikori	4^{r}
(Portugal) J Sousa	3
(Czech Republic) J Veselý	3	5
5	(Belgium) D Goffin	6	7
4	(Croatia) M Čilić	4	7	7
(Spain) F Verdasco	6	5	5
PR	(Argentina) J Mónaco	7^{7}	6
Q	(Australia) J Duckworth	6^{3}	3

Quarterfinals
(Portugal) J Sousa	6	5	2
5	(Belgium) D Goffin	1	7	6
4	(Croatia) M Čilić	7	6
PR	(Argentina) J Mónaco	5	1

Semifinals
5	(Belgium) D Goffin	7	6
4	(Croatia) M Čilić	5	4

=== Bottom half ===
First round
6	(Australia) N Kyrgios	7	6
Q	(United States) R Harrison	5	2
(France) S Robert	2	1
Q	(Czech Republic) R Štěpánek	6	6
(Spain) M Granollers	1	6	3
(Cyprus) M Baghdatis	6	3	6
(Luxembourg) G Müller	7^{9}	6
3	(Czech Republic) T Berdych	6^{7}	1
7	(Croatia) I Karlović	7^{8}	6^{6}	7^{7}
(Argentina) F Delbonis	6^{6}	7^{8}	6^{5}
PR	(Serbia) J Tipsarević	6	6
WC	(Japan) T Daniel	2	4
(France) G Simon	7	4	6
(Germany) P Kohlschreiber	5	6	0
WC	(Japan) Y Sugita	3	1
2	(France) G Monfils	6	6

Second round
6	(Australia) N Kyrgios	w/o
Q	(Czech Republic) R Štěpánek
(Cyprus) M Baghdatis	3	4
(Luxembourg) G Müller	6	6
7	(Croatia) I Karlović	7^{11}	7^{7}
PR	(Serbia) J Tipsarević	6^{9}	6^{5}
(France) G Simon	1	4
2	(France) G Monfils	6	6

Quarterfinals
6	(Australia) N Kyrgios	6	6
(Luxembourg) G Müller	4	2
7	(Croatia) I Karlović	6^{6}	6^{6}
2	(France) G Monfils	7^{8}	7^{8}

Semifinals
6	(Australia) N Kyrgios	6	6
2	(France) G Monfils	4	4

== Qualifying ==
=== Seeds ===
1. (Russia) Mikhail Youzhny (first round)
2. (United Kingdom) Daniel Evans (first round)
3. (Portugal) Gastão Elias (first round)
4. (United States) Donald Young (qualifying competition, Lucky loser)
5. (United States) Jared Donaldson (first round)
6. (Czech Republic) Radek Štěpánek (qualified)
7. (Canada) Vasek Pospisil (qualifying competition, retired)
8. (United States) Ryan Harrison (qualified)

=== Qualifiers ===
1. (Australia) James Duckworth
2. (Czech Republic) Radek Štěpánek
3. (Japan) Go Soeda
4. (United States) Ryan Harrison

=== Lucky losers ===
1. (United States) Donald Young

=== Qualifying draw ===
==== First qualifier ====
First round
1	(Russia) Mikhail Youzhny	2	2
PR	(Australia) Matthew Ebden	6	6
(Australia) James Duckworth	7^{7}	6
5	(United States) Jared Donaldson	6^{5}	4

Qualifying competition
PR	(Australia) Matthew Ebden	2	2
(Australia) James Duckworth	6	6

==== Second qualifier ====
First round
2	(United Kingdom) Daniel Evans	3	6	4
WC	(Japan) Akira Santillan	6	4	6
WC	(Japan) Yosuke Watanuki	4	4
6	(Czech Republic) Radek Štěpánek	6	6

Qualifying competition
WC	(Japan) Akira Santillan	2	6	4
6	(Czech Republic) Radek Štěpánek	6	3	6

==== Third qualifier ====
First round
3	(Portugal) Gastão Elias	2	4
(Japan) Go Soeda	6	6
(South Korea) Duck-hee Lee	7^{7}	6^{2}	3
7	(Canada) Vasek Pospisil	6^{1}	7^{7}	6

Qualifying competition
(Japan) Go Soeda	6	1
7	(Canada) Vasek Pospisil	0	1^{r}

==== Fourth qualifier ====
First round
4	(United States) Donald Young	6	7
(Japan) Tatsuma Ito	3	5
WC	(Japan) Yasutaka Uchiyama	3	6	3
8	(United States) Ryan Harrison	6	3	6

Qualifying competition
4	(United States) Donald Young	7	1	4
8	(United States) Ryan Harrison	5	6	6
