= 2016 Rakuten Japan Open Tennis Championships =

- Date: 3–9 October
- Edition: 43rd
- Category: ATP World Tour 500
- Draw: 32S/16D
- Surface: Hard / outdoor
- Location: Tokyo, Japan

Champions

Singles
- (Australia) Nick Kyrgios

Doubles
- (Spain) Marcel Granollers / (Poland) Marcin Matkowski
- Japan Open

The 2016 Rakuten Japan Open Tennis Championships was a men's tennis tournament played on outdoor hard courts. It was the 43rd edition of the Japan Open, and part of the 500 Series of the 2016 ATP World Tour. It was held at the Ariake Coliseum in Tokyo, Japan, from October 3–9, 2016.

== Finals ==
=== Singles ===
- (Australia) Nick Kyrgios defeated (Belgium) David Goffin, 4−6, 6−3, 7−5

=== Doubles ===
- (Spain) Marcel Granollers / (Poland) Marcin Matkowski defeated (South Africa) Raven Klaasen / (United States) Rajeev Ram, 6–2, 7–6^{(7–4)}

== Points and prize money ==
=== Point distribution ===
Event	W	F	SF	QF	Round of 16	Round of 32	Q	Q2	Q1
Singles	500	300	180	90	45	0	20	10	0
Doubles	500	300	180	90	0	—N/a	—N/a	—N/a	—N/a

=== Prize money ===
Event	W	F	SF	QF	Round of 16	Round of 32	Q2	Q1
Singles	$310,330	$145,750	$72,370	$36,185	$18,335	$9,650	$1,610	$885
Doubles	$91,470	$43,220	$20,860	$10,850	$5,680	—N/a	—N/a	—N/a

== Singles main-draw entrants ==
=== Seeds ===
Country	Player	Rank^{1}	Seed
JPN	Kei Nishikori	5	1
FRA	Gaël Monfils	8	2
CZE	Tomáš Berdych	9	3
CRO	Marin Čilić	11	4
BEL	David Goffin	14	5
AUS	Nick Kyrgios	15	6
CRO	Ivo Karlović	20	7
ESP	Feliciano López	27	8

- ^{1} Rankings are as of September 26, 2016.

=== Other entrants ===
The following players received wildcards into the singles main draw:

- (Japan) Taro Daniel
- (Japan) Yoshihito Nishioka
- (Japan) Yūichi Sugita

The following player using a protected ranking into the singles main draw:

- (Argentina) Juan Mónaco
- (Serbia) Janko Tipsarević

The following players received entry from the qualifying draw:

- (Australia) James Duckworth
- (United States) Ryan Harrison
- (Japan) Go Soeda
- (Czech Republic) Radek Štěpánek

The following player received entry as a lucky loser:

- (United States) Donald Young

=== Withdrawals ===
Before the tournament

- (Spain) Nicolás Almagro →replaced by (United States) Donald Young
- (Croatia) Borna Ćorić →replaced by (Czech Republic) Jiří Veselý
- (Switzerland) Stan Wawrinka →replaced by (France) Stéphane Robert

During the tournament

- (Czech Republic) Radek Štěpánek

=== Retirements ===
- (Spain) Feliciano López
- (Japan) Kei Nishikori

== Doubles main-draw entrants ==
=== Seeds ===
Country	Player	Country	Player	Rank^{1}	Seed
GBR	Jamie Murray	BRA	Bruno Soares	9	1
RSA	Raven Klaasen	USA	Rajeev Ram	30	2
GBR	Dominic Inglot	NED	Jean-Julien Rojer	45	3
FIN	Henri Kontinen	AUS	John Peers	51	4

- Rankings are as of September 26, 2016

=== Other entrants ===
The following pairs received wildcards into the doubles main draw:

- (Japan) Taro Daniel / (Japan) Yasutaka Uchiyama
- (Japan) Akira Santillan / (Japan) Yosuke Watanuki

The following pair received entry from the qualifying draw:

- (United States) Nicholas Monroe / (New Zealand) Artem Sitak

=== Withdrawals ===
During the tournament

- (Czech Republic) Radek Štěpánek

=== Retirements ===
- (Spain) Feliciano López
