= 2016 International Premier Tennis League season =

2016 International Premier Tennis League
- League: International Premier Tennis League
- Sport: Team tennis
- Duration: 2–11 December 2016
- Number of teams: 4
- League champions: Singapore Slammers
- Runners-up: Indian Aces

IPTL seasons
- ← 2015

The 2016 International Premier Tennis League season (2016 IPTL season, officially the 2016 Coca-Cola International Premier Tennis League) was the third and final season of the professional team tennis league contested by four teams in Asia.

== Teams and players ==
Four teams competed in the 2016 IPTL season.

Although the IPTL had announced that the top stars Roger Federer and Serena Williams would take part in this year, both players withdrew due to financial causes shortly after the league had started.

The Philippine Mavericks did not compete in this season, reportedly due to IPTL's failure to fulfill its obligations to the franchise in the 2015 season.

Category	(India) Indian Aces	Japan Warriors	Singapore Slammers	(United Arab Emirates) UAE Royals
Men
Player A	(Spain) Feliciano López	(Japan) Kei Nishikori	(Australia) Nick Kyrgios	(Czech Republic) Tomáš Berdych
Player B	(Croatia) Ivan Dodig	(Spain) Fernando Verdasco	(Cyprus) Marcos Baghdatis	(Uruguay) Pablo Cuevas
Doubles	(India) Rohan Bopanna	(Netherlands) Jean-Julien Rojer	(Brazil) Marcelo Melo	(Canada) Daniel Nestor
Legends A	(Australia) Mark Philippoussis	(Russia) Marat Safin	(Spain) Carlos Moyá	(Croatia) Goran Ivanišević
Legends B	(Sweden) Thomas Enqvist	(Chile) Fernando González	(Germany) Rainer Schüttler	(Sweden) Thomas Johansson
Player C		(India) Prajnesh Gunneswaran		
Women
Player A	(India) Sania Mirza	(Serbia) Jelena Janković	(Netherlands) Kiki Bertens	(Serbia) Ana Ivanovic
Player B	(Belgium) Kirsten Flipkens	(Japan) Kurumi Nara		(Switzerland) Martina Hingis

== Schedule ==
The 2016 IPTL will be played in three cities.

Round	Location	Date	Team 1	Score	Team 2
1	(Japan) Saitama; Saitama Super Arena	2 December	UAE Royals	29–19	Singapore Slammers
1	(Japan) Saitama; Saitama Super Arena	2 December	Japan Warriors	17–30	Indian Aces
2	(Japan) Saitama; Saitama Super Arena	3 December	Singapore Slammers	25–26	Indian Aces
2	(Japan) Saitama; Saitama Super Arena	3 December	Japan Warriors	23–20	UAE Royals
3	(Japan) Saitama; Saitama Super Arena	4 December	UAE Royals	30-20	Indian Aces
3	(Japan) Saitama; Saitama Super Arena	4 December	Japan Warriors	23-27	Singapore Slammers
4	Singapore; Singapore Indoor Stadium	6 December	Indian Aces	26-19	UAE Royals
4	Singapore; Singapore Indoor Stadium	6 December	Singapore Slammers	29-16	Japan Warriors
5	Singapore; Singapore Indoor Stadium	7 December	Indian Aces	20-27	Japan Warriors
5	Singapore; Singapore Indoor Stadium	7 December	Singapore Slammers	30-18	UAE Royals
6	Singapore; Singapore Indoor Stadium	8 December	UAE Royals	20-23	Japan Warriors
6	Singapore; Singapore Indoor Stadium	8 December	Singapore Slammers	22-23	Indian Aces
7	(India) Hyderabad; Gachibowli Indoor Stadium	9 December	UAE Royals	20-25	Japan Warriors
7	(India) Hyderabad; Gachibowli Indoor Stadium	9 December	Indian Aces	24-19	Singapore Slammers
8	(India) Hyderabad; Gachibowli Indoor Stadium	10 December	Singapore Slammers	30-20	Japan Warriors
8	(India) Hyderabad; Gachibowli Indoor Stadium	10 December	Indian Aces	20-24	UAE Royals
Final	(India) Hyderabad; Gachibowli Indoor Stadium	11 December	Singapore Slammers	30-14	Indian Aces

== Results table ==
Team	Round								
Team	1	2	3	4	5	6	7	8	Final
Team	Dec 2	Dec 3	Dec 4	Dec 6	Dec 7	Dec 8	Dec 9	Dec 10	Dec 11
(India) Indian Aces (IND)	JPN	SIN	UAE	UAE	JPN	SIN	SIN	UAE	SIN
(India) Indian Aces (IND)	30–17	26–25	20–30	26–19	20–27	23–22	24–19	20–24	14–30
Japan Warriors (JPN)	IND	UAE	SIN	SIN	IND	UAE	UAE	SIN	3rd
Japan Warriors (JPN)	17–30	23–20	23–27	16–29	27–20	23–20	25–20	20–30	3rd
Singapore Slammers (SIN)	UAE	IND	JPN	JPN	UAE	IND	IND	JPN	IND
Singapore Slammers (SIN)	19–29	25–26	27–23	29–16	30–18	22–23	19–24	30–20	30–14
(United Arab Emirates) UAE Royals (UAE)	SIN	JPN	IND	IND	SIN	JPN	JPN	IND	4th
(United Arab Emirates) UAE Royals (UAE)	29–19	20–23	30–20	19–26	18–30	20–23	20–25	24–20	4th
Color Key: Win • Loss • Home • Away • Neutral

== Standings ==
Standings are determined by number of points. 3 points for match win, 1 point for loss with at least 20 games wins.
Top two teams qualify for final.

P	Team	MP	W	L	GW	GL	Pts
1	(India) Indian Aces	8	5	3	189	183	18
2	Singapore Slammers	8	4	4	201	179	14
3	Japan Warriors	8	4	4	174	196	14
4	(United Arab Emirates) UAE Royals	8	3	5	180	186	12

== Final ==
Date	Fixture	Score	Venue
11 December	Singapore Slammers vs. Indian Aces	30–14	Hyderabad, India

All Matches
Set	Singapore Slammers	Indian Aces	Score	Score after set
Legends' Singles	Carlos Moyá	Mark Philippoussis	6–4	6–4
Women's Singles	Kiki Bertens	Kirsten Flipkens (Sania Mirza sub.)	6–3	12–7
Mixed Doubles	Kiki Bertens / Marcelo Melo	Sania Mirza / Rohan Bopanna (Ivan Dodig sub.)	6–1	18–8
Men's Doubles	Nick Kyrgios / Marcelo Melo	Feliciano López / Ivan Dodig	6–2	24–10
Men's Singles	Marcos Baghdatis	Feliciano López	6–4	30–14
