= 2016 Bank of the West Classic – Doubles =

Doubles
- 2016 Bank of the West Classic

Final
- Champions: (United States) Raquel Atawo (United States) Abigail Spears
- Runners-up: (Croatia) Darija Jurak (Australia) Anastasia Rodionova
- Score: 6–3, 6–4

Events
Singles	Doubles
← 2015 ·	Bank of the West Classic	· 2017 →

Xu Yifan and Zheng Saisai were the defending champions, but lost in the quarterfinals to Johanna Konta and Maria Sanchez.

Raquel Atawo and Abigail Spears won the title for the second time, defeating Darija Jurak and Anastasia Rodionova in the final, 6–3, 6–4.

== Seeds ==
1. (China) Xu Yifan / (China) Zheng Saisai (quarterfinals)
2. (United States) Raquel Atawo / (United States) Abigail Spears (champions)
3. (Croatia) Darija Jurak / (Australia) Anastasia Rodionova (final)
4. (Germany) Anna-Lena Grönefeld / (Czech Republic) Květa Peschke (semifinals)

== Draw ==
=== Key ===
- Q = Qualifier
- WC = Wild card
- LL = Lucky loser
- Alt = Alternate
- SE = Special exempt
- PR = Protected ranking
- ITF = ITF entry
- JE = Junior exempt
- w/o = Walkover
- r = Retired
- d = Defaulted
- SR = Special ranking

First round
1	(China) Y Xu (China) S Zheng	7	6
WC	(Ukraine) Y Beygelzimer (Czech Republic) Kr Plíšková	5	1
(China) X Han (China) C Liang	5	6^{4}
(United Kingdom) J Konta (United States) M Sanchez	7	7^{7}
3	(Croatia) D Jurak (Australia) An Rodionova	6	6
(United States) J Boserup (Bulgaria) E Kostova	2	2
(United States) C Bellis (United States) J Brady	2	3
(Ukraine) K Bondarenko (Ukraine) O Savchuk	6	6
(Japan) M Doi (Japan) N Hibino	2	6	[10]
(United States) A Muhammad (United States) T Townsend	6	2	[12]
(Paraguay) V Cepede Royg (Argentina) M Irigoyen	4	6	[9]
4	(Germany) A-L Grönefeld (Czech Republic) K Peschke	6	3	[11]
(United States) N Gibbs (Canada) C Zhao	4	4
(Latvia) J Ostapenko (Australia) Ar Rodionova	6	6
(Israel) J Glushko (Poland) M Linette	3	4
2	(United States) R Atawo (United States) A Spears	6	6

Quarterfinals
1	(China) Y Xu (China) S Zheng	4	4
(United Kingdom) J Konta (United States) M Sanchez	6	6
3	(Croatia) D Jurak (Australia) An Rodionova	6	6
(Ukraine) K Bondarenko (Ukraine) O Savchuk	2	4
(United States) A Muhammad (United States) T Townsend	6	1	[3]
4	(Germany) A-L Grönefeld (Czech Republic) K Peschke	4	6	[10]
(Latvia) J Ostapenko (Australia) Ar Rodionova	6	5	[7]
2	(United States) R Atawo (United States) A Spears	2	7	[10]

Semifinals
(United Kingdom) J Konta (United States) M Sanchez	4	2
3	(Croatia) D Jurak (Australia) An Rodionova	6	6
4	(Germany) A-L Grönefeld (Czech Republic) K Peschke	3	6^{8}
2	(United States) R Atawo (United States) A Spears	6	7^{10}

Final
3	(Croatia) D Jurak (Australia) An Rodionova	3	4
2	(United States) R Atawo (United States) A Spears	6	6
