= 2016 German Open =

- Date: 11–17 July
- Edition: 110th
- Category: World Tour 500
- Draw: 32S / 16D
- Prize money: €1,388,830
- Surface: Clay / outdoor
- Location: Hamburg, Germany
- Venue: Am Rothenbaum

Champions

Singles
- (Slovakia) Martin Kližan

Doubles
- (Finland) Henri Kontinen / (Australia) John Peers
- German Open Tennis Championships

The 2016 German Open was a men's tennis tournament played on outdoor red clay courts. It was the 110th edition of the German Open and part of the ATP World Tour 500 series of the 2016 ATP World Tour. It took place at the Am Rothenbaum in Hamburg, Germany, from 11 July until 17 July 2016. Seventh-seeded Martin Kližan won the singles title.

== Finals ==
=== Singles ===
- (Slovakia) Martin Kližan defeated (Uruguay) Pablo Cuevas, 6–1, 6–4

=== Doubles ===
- (Finland) Henri Kontinen / (Australia) John Peers defeated (Canada) Daniel Nestor / (Pakistan) Aisam-ul-Haq Qureshi, 7–5, 6–3

== Points and prize money ==
=== Points distribution ===
Event	W	F	SF	QF	Round of 16	Round of 32	Q	Q2	Q1
Singles	500	300	180	90	45	0	20	10	0
Doubles	500	300	180	90	0	—N/a	—N/a	—N/a	—N/a

=== Prize money ===
Event	W	F	SF	QF	Round of 16	Round of 32	Q2	Q1
Singles	€316,000	€148,400	€73,690	€36,845	€18,670	€9,825	€1,640	€900
Doubles	€93,140	€44,010	€21,240	€11,040	€5,780	—N/a	—N/a	—N/a

== Singles main draw entrants ==
=== Seeds ===
Country	Player	Rank^{1}	Seed
GER	Philipp Kohlschreiber	22	1
FRA	Benoît Paire	23	2
URU	Pablo Cuevas	24	3
GER	Alexander Zverev	28	4
FRA	Jérémy Chardy	34	5
ESP	Nicolás Almagro	47	6
SVK	Martin Kližan	48	7
ESP	Guillermo García-López	58	8

- ^{1} Rankings are as of June 27, 2016

=== Other entrants ===
The following players received wildcards into the singles main draw:

- (Germany) Florian Mayer
- (Germany) Marvin Möller
- (Germany) Louis Wessels

The following players received entry from the qualifying draw:

- (Canada) Steven Diez
- (Brazil) Thiago Monteiro
- (Russia) Daniil Medvedev
- (Czech Republic) Jan Šátral

=== Withdrawals ===
Before the tournament

- (South Africa) Kevin Anderson →replaced by (Russia) Mikhail Youzhny
- (Spain) Roberto Bautista Agut →replaced by (France) Stéphane Robert
- (Spain) Pablo Carreño Busta →replaced by (Germany) Jan-Lennard Struff
- (Argentina) Federico Delbonis →replaced by (Italy) Thomas Fabbiano
- (Italy) Fabio Fognini →replaced by (Netherlands) Igor Sijsling
- (Tunisia) Malek Jaziri →replaced by (Argentina) Carlos Berlocq
- (Argentina) Juan Mónaco →replaced by (Argentina) Máximo González
- (Argentina) Guido Pella →replaced by (Austria) Gerald Melzer
- (France) Lucas Pouille →replaced by (Germany) Mischa Zverev
- (Czech Republic) Lukáš Rosol →replaced by (France) Kenny de Schepper
- (Austria) Dominic Thiem →replaced by (Argentina) Renzo Olivo
- (Czech Republic) Jiří Veselý →replaced by (Slovenia) Grega Žemlja

== Doubles main draw entrants ==
=== Seeds ===
Country	Player	Country	Player	Rank^{1}	Seed
POL	Łukasz Kubot	AUT	Alexander Peya	40	1
FIN	Henri Kontinen	AUS	John Peers	45	2
CAN	Daniel Nestor	PAK	Aisam-ul-Haq Qureshi	58	3
CRO	Mate Pavić	NZL	Michael Venus	73	4

- Rankings are as of June 27, 2016

=== Other entrants ===
The following pairs received wildcards into the doubles main draw:

- (Germany) Andre Begemann / (Germany) Jan-Lennard Struff
- (Germany) Alexander Zverev / (Germany) Mischa Zverev

The following pair received entry from the qualifying draw:

- (France) Kenny de Schepper / (France) Axel Michon

The following pair received entry as lucky losers:

- (Germany) Daniel Masur / (Germany) Cedrik-Marcel Stebe

=== Withdrawals ===
Before the tournament

- (Germany) Florian Mayer (illness)
