= 2016 China Open – Men's doubles =

Men's doubles
- 2016 China Open

Final
- Champions: (Spain) Pablo Carreño Busta (Spain) Rafael Nadal
- Runners-up: (United States) Jack Sock (Australia) Bernard Tomic
- Score: 6−7^{(6−8)}, 6−2, [10−8]

Events
Singles	men	women
Doubles	men	women
← 2015 ·	China Open	· 2017 →

Vasek Pospisil and Jack Sock were the defending champions, but Pospisil chose to play in Tokyo instead. Sock played alongside Bernard Tomic but lost in the final to Pablo Carreño Busta and Rafael Nadal, who won 6−7^{(6−8)}, 6−2, [10−8].

== Seeds ==
1. (United States) Bob Bryan / (United States) Mike Bryan (semifinals)
2. (Poland) Łukasz Kubot / (Brazil) Marcelo Melo (semifinals)
3. (India) Rohan Bopanna / (Canada) Daniel Nestor (first round)
4. (Philippines) Treat Huey / (Belarus) Max Mirnyi (first round)

== Draw ==
=== Key ===
- Q = Qualifier
- WC = Wild card
- LL = Lucky loser
- Alt = Alternate
- SE = Special exempt
- PR = Protected ranking
- ITF = ITF entry
- JE = Junior exempt
- w/o = Walkover
- r = Retired
- d = Defaulted
- SR = Special ranking

=== Draw ===
First round
1	(United States) B Bryan (United States) M Bryan	6	3	[16]
(Spain) R Bautista Agut (Spain) D Ferrer	1	6	[14]
(France) R Gasquet (France) L Pouille	4	6	[10]
(Croatia) M Pavić (New Zealand) M Venus	6	4	[6]
3	(India) R Bopanna (Canada) D Nestor	6^{3}	4
(Spain) P Carreño Busta (Spain) R Nadal	7^{7}	6
WC	(China) M Gong (China) Z Zhang	3	6	[10]
(United States) S Johnson (United States) S Querrey	6	3	[4]
WC	(Germany) A Begemann (India) L Paes	6	5	[7]
(United States) J Sock (Australia) B Tomic	3	7	[10]
Q	(Italy) P Lorenzi (Argentina) G Pella	3	6	[10]
4	(Philippines) T Huey (Belarus) M Mirnyi	6	1	[4]
(France) J Benneteau (France) É Roger-Vasselin	6	7
(Canada) M Raonic (Serbia) N Zimonjić	4	5
(Uruguay) P Cuevas (Serbia) V Troicki	6^{10}	3
2	(Poland) Ł Kubot (Brazil) M Melo	7^{12}	6

Quarterfinals
1	(United States) B Bryan (United States) M Bryan	w/o
(France) R Gasquet (France) L Pouille
(Spain) P Carreño Busta (Spain) R Nadal	7	6
WC	(China) M Gong (China) Z Zhang	5	3
(United States) J Sock (Australia) B Tomic	4	6	[10]
Q	(Italy) P Lorenzi (Argentina) G Pella	6	4	[7]
(France) J Benneteau (France) É Roger-Vasselin	7	3	[8]
2	(Poland) Ł Kubot (Brazil) M Melo	5	6	[10]

Semifinals
1	(United States) B Bryan (United States) M Bryan	5	4
(Spain) P Carreño Busta (Spain) R Nadal	7	6
(United States) J Sock (Australia) B Tomic	7	6
2	(Poland) Ł Kubot (Brazil) M Melo	5	4

Final
(Spain) P Carreño Busta (Spain) R Nadal	6^{6}	6	[10]
(United States) J Sock (Australia) B Tomic	7^{8}	2	[8]

== Qualifying ==
=== Seeds ===
1. (Israel) Jonathan Erlich / (Mexico) Santiago González (first round)
2. (Russia) Andrey Kuznetsov / (Brazil) André Sá (first round)

=== Qualifiers ===
1. (Italy) Paolo Lorenzi / (Argentina) Guido Pella

=== Qualifying draw ===
First round
1	(Israel) Jonathan Erlich (Mexico) Santiago González	7^{8}	6^{5}	[8]
(Italy) Paolo Lorenzi (Argentina) Guido Pella	6^{6}	7^{7}	[10]
WC	(Germany) Florian Mayer (India) Purav Raja	2	7	[10]
2	(Russia) Andrey Kuznetsov (Brazil) André Sá	6	5	[6]

Qualifying competition
(Italy) Paolo Lorenzi (Argentina) Guido Pella	6	7^{7}
WC	(Germany) Florian Mayer (India) Purav Raja	1	6^{5}
