= 2016 German Open – Singles =

Singles
- 2016 German Open

Final
- Champion: (Slovakia) Martin Kližan
- Runner-up: (Uruguay) Pablo Cuevas
- Score: 6–1, 6–4

Details
- Draw: 32
- Seeds: 8

Events
Singles	Doubles
- German Open Tennis Championships

Rafael Nadal was the defending champion, but chose not to participate this year.

Martin Kližan won the title, defeating Pablo Cuevas in the final, 6–1, 6–4.

== Seeds ==
1. (Germany) Philipp Kohlschreiber (quarterfinals)
2. (France) Benoît Paire (first round)
3. (Uruguay) Pablo Cuevas (final)
4. (Germany) Alexander Zverev (first round)
5. (France) Jérémy Chardy (first round)
6. (Spain) Nicolás Almagro (second round)
7. (Slovakia) Martin Kližan (champion)
8. (Spain) Guillermo García-López (quarterfinals)

== Draw ==
Key

- Q = Qualifier
- WC = Wild card
- LL = Lucky loser
- Alt = Alternate
- ITF = ITF entry
- PR = Protected ranking
- SR = Special ranking
- SE = Special exempt
- JE = Junior exempt
- JR = Junior Accelerator Programme entrant
- CO = College Accelerator Programme entrant
- NG = Next Gen Accelerator Program entrant
- w/o = Walkover
- r = Retired
- d = Defaulted

=== Finals ===
Semifinals
(Argentina) Renzo Olivo	5	3
3	(Uruguay) Pablo Cuevas	7	6
(France) Stéphane Robert	3	4
7	(Slovakia) Martin Kližan	6	6

Final
3	(Uruguay) Pablo Cuevas	1	4
7	(Slovakia) Martin Kližan	6	6

=== Top half ===
First round
1	(Germany) P Kohlschreiber	6	6^{5}	6
(Argentina) C Berlocq	3	7^{7}	3
(Argentina) N Kicker	6	5	6
(Italy) T Fabbiano	3	7	1
(Russia) M Youzhny	6^{5}	6	1
(Argentina) R Olivo	7^{7}	2	6
(Argentina) M González	6	2	7^{7}
5	(France) J Chardy	2	6	6^{4}
3	(Uruguay) P Cuevas	6	6
WC	(Germany) F Mayer	4	3
Q	(Brazil) T Monteiro	7^{7}	6
(Germany) M Zverev	6^{5}	4
(France) P-H Mathieu	6	7^{7}
(Austria) G Melzer	4	6^{5}
Q	(Czech Republic) J Šátral	3	6	2
6	(Spain) N Almagro	6	3	6

Second round
1	(Germany) P Kohlschreiber	4	6	6
(Argentina) N Kicker	6	1	2
(Argentina) R Olivo	6	6
(Argentina) M González	3	4
3	(Uruguay) P Cuevas	6	6
Q	(Brazil) T Monteiro	2	3
(France) P-H Mathieu	4	7^{7}	7
6	(Spain) N Almagro	6	6^{4}	5

Quarterfinals
1	(Germany) P Kohlschreiber	6	0	5
(Argentina) R Olivo	1	6	7
3	(Uruguay) P Cuevas	7^{9}	6
(France) P-H Mathieu	6^{7}	1

Semifinals
(Argentina) R Olivo	5	3
3	(Uruguay) P Cuevas	7	6

=== Bottom half ===
First round
8	(Spain) G García-López	5	6	7^{8}
(France) K de Schepper	7	2	6^{6}
WC	(Germany) M Möller	1	2
(Slovenia) G Žemlja	6	6
(Argentina) L Mayer	6^{3}	4
(France) S Robert	7^{7}	6
(Spain) Í Cervantes	7	7^{7}
4	(Germany) A Zverev	5	6^{2}
7	(Slovakia) M Kližan	6	1	6
(Netherlands) I Sijsling	4	6	3
Q	(Canada) S Diez	7	2	1
WC	(Germany) L Wessels	5	6	6
(Germany) J-L Struff	4	7	4
Q	(Russia) D Medvedev	6	5	6
(Spain) D Gimeno-Traver	7	3	6
2	(France) B Paire	5	6	4

Second round
8	(Spain) G García-López	6	6
(Slovenia) G Žemlja	2	2
(France) S Robert	7	4	6
(Spain) Í Cervantes	5	6	1
7	(Slovakia) M Kližan	6	6
WC	(Germany) L Wessels	1	1
Q	(Russia) D Medvedev	7	6^{4}	6^{2}
(Spain) D Gimeno-Traver	5	7^{7}	7^{7}

Quarterfinals
8	(Spain) G García-López	6^{4}	6	3
(France) S Robert	7^{7}	4	6
7	(Slovakia) M Kližan	6	6
(Spain) D Gimeno-Traver	4	3

Semifinals
(France) S Robert	3	4
7	(Slovakia) M Kližan	6	6

== Qualifying ==
=== Seeds ===
1. (Brazil) Thiago Monteiro (qualified)
2. (Argentina) Guido Andreozzi (first round)
3. (Canada) Steven Diez (qualified)
4. (Russia) Daniil Medvedev (qualified)
5. (France) Axel Michon (first round)
6. (Czech Republic) Jan Šátral (qualified)
7. (Czech Republic) Jan Mertl (qualifying competition)
8. (Czech Republic) Michal Konečný (first round)

=== Qualifiers ===
1. (Brazil) Thiago Monteiro
2. (Czech Republic) Jan Šátral
3. (Canada) Steven Diez
4. (Russia) Daniil Medvedev

=== Qualifying draw ===
==== First qualifier ====
First round
1	(Brazil) Thiago Monteiro	6	6
WC	(Germany) Demian Raab	2	1
(Germany) Daniel Masur	6	6
8	(Czech Republic) Michal Konečný	3	3

Qualifying competition
1	(Brazil) Thiago Monteiro	7^{8}	6^{2}	6
(Germany) Daniel Masur	6^{6}	7^{7}	3

==== Second qualifier ====
First round
2	(Argentina) Guido Andreozzi	2	1
WC	(Germany) Cedrik-Marcel Stebe	6	6
(Italy) Lorenzo Sonego	4	6	6^{2}
6	(Czech Republic) Jan Šátral	6	3	7^{7}

Qualifying competition
WC	(Germany) Cedrik-Marcel Stebe	4	4
6	(Czech Republic) Jan Šátral	6	6

==== Third qualifier ====
First round
3	(Canada) Steven Diez	6	7
(Switzerland) Yann Marti	3	5
(Italy) Matteo Viola	6	6
5	(France) Axel Michon	2	1

Qualifying competition
3	(Canada) Steven Diez	6	6
(Italy) Matteo Viola	4	4

==== Fourth qualifier ====
First round
4	(Russia) Daniil Medvedev	6	6
WC	(Germany) Nico Matic	4	2
(Spain) Roberto Ortega Olmedo	4	2
7	(Czech Republic) Jan Mertl	6	6

Qualifying competition
4	(Russia) Daniil Medvedev	6	6
7	(Czech Republic) Jan Mertl	4	2
