= 2016 Bank of the West Classic – Singles =

Singles
- 2016 Bank of the West Classic

Final
- Champion: (United Kingdom) Johanna Konta
- Runner-up: (United States) Venus Williams
- Score: 7–5, 5–7, 6–2

Details
- Draw: 28
- Seeds: 8

Events
Singles	Doubles
- Bank of the West Classic

Angelique Kerber was the reigning champion, but chose to compete in Båstad instead.

Johanna Konta won her first WTA title, defeating Venus Williams in the final, 7–5, 5–7, 6–2.

Williams was attempting to win her third title in Stanford and 50th WTA title overall.

== Seeds ==
The top four seeds received a bye into the second round.

1. (United States) Venus Williams (final)
2. (Slovakia) Dominika Cibulková (semifinals)
3. (United Kingdom) Johanna Konta (champion)
4. (United States) CoCo Vandeweghe (quarterfinals, retired)
5. (Japan) Misaki Doi (quarterfinals)
6. (Latvia) Jeļena Ostapenko (first round)
7. (France) Alizé Cornet (second round)
8. (United States) Varvara Lepchenko (first round)

== Draw ==
Key

- Q = Qualifier
- WC = Wild card
- LL = Lucky loser
- Alt = Alternate
- ITF = ITF entry
- PR = Protected ranking
- SR = Special ranking
- SE = Special exempt
- JE = Junior exempt
- JR = Junior Accelerator Programme entrant
- CO = College Accelerator Programme entrant
- NG = Next Gen Accelerator Program entrant
- w/o = Walkover
- r = Retired
- d = Defaulted

=== Finals ===
Semifinals
1	(United States) Venus Williams	6	7^{7}
(United States) Alison Riske	1	6^{2}
3	(United Kingdom) Johanna Konta	6	6
2	(Slovakia) Dominika Cibulková	4	2

Final
1	(United States) Venus Williams	5	7	2
3	(United Kingdom) Johanna Konta	7	5	6

=== Top half ===
First round
(Czech Republic) Kr Plíšková	6	2	5
(Poland) M Linette	2	6	7
Q	(United States) S Vickery	6	6
Q	(Bulgaria) E Kostova	1	2
WC	(United States) C Bellis	6	6
6	(Latvia) J Ostapenko	4	4
(United States) N Gibbs	6	4	6
WC	(Canada) C Zhao	2	6	3
Q	(Romania) A Bogdan	6	5	6
Q	(United States) A Muhammad	4	7	3
(United States) A Riske	2	6	7^{7}
8	(United States) V Lepchenko	6	3	6^{4}

Second round
1	(United States) V Williams	6	6^{6}	6
(Poland) M Linette	3	7^{8}	2
Q	(United States) S Vickery	6	4	3
WC	(United States) C Bellis	4	6	6
4	(United States) C Vandeweghe	2	6	6
(United States) N Gibbs	6	4	2
Q	(Romania) A Bogdan	6	2	4
(United States) A Riske	3	6	6

Quarterfinals
1	(United States) V Williams	6	6
WC	(United States) C Bellis	4	1
4	(United States) C Vandeweghe	3	1^{r}
(United States) A Riske	6	0

Semifinals
1	(United States) V Williams	6	7^{7}
(United States) A Riske	1	6^{2}

=== Bottom half ===
First round
7	(France) A Cornet	3	6	6
(United States) J Brady	6	4	4
(China) S Zheng	7	6
WC	(United States) M Mateas	5	1
WC	(United States) J Boserup	2	6	6
(Japan) N Osaka	6	4	4
5	(Japan) M Doi	6	2	6
(China) X Han	0	6	2
(Paraguay) V Cepede Royg	5	6	4
(Japan) N Hibino	7	4	6
(Poland) U Radwańska	6	7
(Ukraine) K Bondarenko	4	5

Second round
7	(France) A Cornet	4	1
(China) S Zheng	6	6
WC	(United States) J Boserup	3	1
3	(United Kingdom) J Konta	6	6
5	(Japan) M Doi	6	6
(Japan) N Hibino	3	4
(Poland) U Radwańska	6^{3}	3
2	(Slovakia) D Cibulková	7^{7}	6

Quarterfinals
(China) S Zheng	2	6	3
3	(United Kingdom) J Konta	6	4	6
5	(Japan) M Doi	5	0
2	(Slovakia) D Cibulková	7	6

Semifinals
3	(United Kingdom) J Konta	6	6
2	(Slovakia) D Cibulková	4	2

== Qualifying ==
=== Seeds ===
The top two seeds received a bye into the qualifying competition.

1. (Israel) Julia Glushko (qualifying competition)
2. (Bulgaria) Elitsa Kostova (qualified)
3. (Romania) Ana Bogdan (qualified)
4. (United States) Taylor Townsend (qualifying competition)
5. (Poland) Urszula Radwańska (moved to main draw)
6. (Belarus) Olga Govortsova (qualifying competition)
7. (Ukraine) Olga Savchuk (first round)
8. (United States) Asia Muhammad (qualified)
9. (United States) Sachia Vickery (qualified)

=== Qualifiers ===
1. (United States) Asia Muhammad
2. (Bulgaria) Elitsa Kostova
3. (Romania) Ana Bogdan
4. (United States) Sachia Vickery

=== Draw ===
==== First qualifier ====
First round				Qualifying competition
				1	(Israel) Julia Glushko	2	3
WC	(United States) Caroline Lampl	1	0	8	(United States) Asia Muhammad	6	6
8	(United States) Asia Muhammad	6	6

==== Second qualifier ====
First round				Qualifying competition
				2	(Bulgaria) Elitsa Kostova	6	6
WC	(United States) Melissa Lord	2	3	6	(Belarus) Olga Govortsova	0	3
6	(Belarus) Olga Govortsova	6	6

==== Third qualifier ====
First round
3	(Romania) Ana Bogdan	6	6
(United States) Maria Sanchez	1	2
(Ukraine) Yuliya Beygelzimer	6	6
7	(Ukraine) Olga Savchuk	4	1

Qualifying competition
3	(Romania) Ana Bogdan	6	2	6
(Ukraine) Yuliya Beygelzimer	1	6	2

==== Fourth qualifier ====
First round
4	(United States) Taylor Townsend	3	7	6
(Australia) Arina Rodionova	6	5	4
(China) Xu Yifan	3	2
9	(United States) Sachia Vickery	6	6

Qualifying competition
4	(United States) Taylor Townsend	2	2
9	(United States) Sachia Vickery	6	6
