= 2016 Bank of the West Classic =

- Date: 18–24 July
- Edition: 45th
- Category: WTA Premier
- Draw: 28S / 16D
- Prize money: $753,000
- Surface: Hard
- Location: Stanford, California, United States

Champions

Singles
- (United Kingdom) Johanna Konta

Doubles
- (United States) Raquel Atawo / (United States) Abigail Spears
- Stanford Classic

The 2016 Bank of the West Classic was a professional tennis tournament played on hard courts. It was the 45th edition of the tournament, and part of the WTA Premier tournaments of the 2016 WTA Tour. It took place in Stanford, California, United States between 18 and 24 July 2016. It was the first women's event on the 2016 US Open Series.

== Points and prize money ==
=== Point distribution ===
| Event | W | F | SF | QF | Round of 16 | Round of 32 | Round of 64 | Q | Q2 | Q1 |
| Women's singles | 470 | 305 | 185 | 100 | 55 | 30 | 1 | 25 | 13 | 1 |
| Women's doubles | 470 | 305 | 185 | 100 | 1 | —N/a | —N/a | —N/a | —N/a | —N/a |

=== Prize money ===
| Event | W | F | SF | QF | Round of 16 | Round of 32 | Q2 | Q1 |
| Women's singles | $128,100 | $68,280 | $37,330 | $21,330 | $10,670 | $6,990 | $3,225 | $1,810 |
| Women's doubles | $40,300 | $21,330 | $11,735 | $5,975 | $3,240 | —N/a | —N/a | —N/a |

== Singles main-draw entrants ==
=== Seeds ===
| Country | Player | Rank^{1} | Seed |
|---|---|---|---|
| USA | Venus Williams | 7 | 1 |
| SVK | Dominika Cibulková | 12 | 2 |
| GBR | Johanna Konta | 18 | 3 |
| USA | CoCo Vandeweghe | 35 | 4 |
| JPN | Misaki Doi | 36 | 5 |
| LAT | Jeļena Ostapenko | 37 | 6 |
| FRA | Alizé Cornet | 51 | 7 |
| USA | Varvara Lepchenko | 52 | 8 |

- ^{1} Rankings are as of July 11, 2016.

=== Other entrants ===
The following players received wildcards into the singles main draw:

- (United States) Catherine Bellis
- (United States) Julia Boserup
- (United States) Maria Mateas
- (Canada) Carol Zhao

The following players received entry from the qualifying draw:

- (Romania) Ana Bogdan
- (Bulgaria) Elitsa Kostova
- (United States) Asia Muhammad
- (United States) Sachia Vickery

=== Withdrawals ===
Before the tournament

- (Hungary) Tímea Babos → replaced by (Paraguay) Verónica Cepede Royg
- (Colombia) Mariana Duque Mariño → replaced by (United States) Jennifer Brady
- (Chinese Taipei) Hsieh Su-wei → replaced by (Japan) Naomi Osaka
- (Russia) Daria Kasatkina → replaced by (Czech Republic) Kristýna Plíšková
- (Russia) Anastasia Pavlyuchenkova → replaced by (Poland) Urszula Radwańska
- (Poland) Agnieszka Radwańska → replaced by (United States) Alison Riske
- (Ukraine) Lesia Tsurenko → replaced by (China) Han Xinyun

=== Retirements ===
- (United States) CoCo Vandeweghe (Right ankle injury)

== Doubles main-draw entrants ==
=== Seeds ===
| Country | Player | Country | Player | Rank^{1} | Seed |
|---|---|---|---|---|---|
| CHN | Xu Yifan | CHN | Zheng Saisai | 31 | 1 |
| USA | Raquel Atawo | USA | Abigail Spears | 40 | 2 |
| CRO | Darija Jurak | AUS | Anastasia Rodionova | 83 | 3 |
| GER | Anna-Lena Grönefeld | CZE | Květa Peschke | 105 | 4 |

- ^{1} Rankings are as of July 11, 2016.

=== Other entrants ===
The following pair received a wildcard into the main draw:

- (Ukraine) Yuliya Beygelzimer / (Czech Republic) Kristýna Plíšková

== Finals ==
=== Singles ===
- (United Kingdom) Johanna Konta defeated (United States) Venus Williams, 7–5, 5–7, 6–2

=== Doubles ===
- (United States) Raquel Atawo / (United States) Abigail Spears defeated (Croatia) Darija Jurak / (Australia) Anastasia Rodionova, 6–3, 6–4
