= 2016 China Open (tennis) =

- Date: 3 October – 9 October
- Edition: 18th (ATP) / 20th (WTA)
- Category: ATP World Tour 500 (men); Premier Mandatory (women)
- Prize money: ATP $2,916,550; WTA $6,289,521
- Surface: Hard
- Location: Beijing, China
- Venue: National Tennis Center

Champions

Men's singles
- (United Kingdom) Andy Murray

Women's singles
- (Poland) Agnieszka Radwańska

Men's doubles
- (Spain) Pablo Carreño Busta / (Spain) Rafael Nadal

Women's doubles
- (United States) Bethanie Mattek-Sands / (Czech Republic) Lucie Šafářová
← 2015 ·	China Open (tennis)	· 2017 →

The 2016 China Open was a tennis tournament played on outdoor hard courts. It was the 18th edition of the China Open for the men (20th for the women). It was part of ATP World Tour 500 series on the 2016 ATP World Tour, and the last WTA Premier Mandatory tournament of the 2016 WTA Tour. Both the men's and the women's events were held at the National Tennis Center in Beijing, China, from October 3 to October 9, 2016.

== Points and prize money ==
=== Point distribution ===
Event	W	F	SF	QF	Round of 16	Round of 32	Round of 64	Q	Q2	Q1
Men's singles	500	300	180	90	45	0	—	20	10	0
Men's doubles	500	300	180	90	0	—	—	—	—	—
Women's singles	1,000	650	390	215	120	65	10	30	20	2
Women's doubles	1,000	650	390	215	120	5	—	—	—	—

=== Prize money ===
Event	W	F	SF	QF	Round of 16	Round of 32	Round of 64	Q2	Q1
Men's singles	$663,575	$311,650	$154,750	$77,375	$39,205	$20,635	—	$3,440	$1,890
Men's doubles	$195,590	$92,420	$44,600	$23,190	$12,140	—	—	—	—
Women's singles	$1,111,945	$556,440	$271,490	$130,420	$62,768	$30,386	$17,453	$4,650	$2,702
Women's doubles	$376,191	$188,770	$84,040	$38,789	$18,104	$8,407	—	—	—

== ATP singles main-draw entrants ==
=== Seeds ===
Country	Player	Rank^{1}	Seed
GBR	Andy Murray	2	1
ESP	Rafael Nadal	4	2
CAN	Milos Raonic	6	3
AUT	Dominic Thiem	10	4
ESP	David Ferrer	12	5
FRA	Lucas Pouille	16	6
ESP	Roberto Bautista Agut	17	7
FRA	Richard Gasquet	18	8

- ^{1} Rankings are as of September 26, 2016

=== Other entrants ===
The following players received wildcards into the singles main draw:

- (Chinese Taipei) Lu Yen-hsun
- (Austria) Dominic Thiem
- (China) Zhang Ze

The following player using a protected ranking into the singles main draw:

- (Germany) Florian Mayer

The following players received entry from the qualifying draw:

- (United Kingdom) Kyle Edmund
- (Russia) Konstantin Kravchuk
- (France) Adrian Mannarino
- (Australia) John Millman

=== Withdrawals ===
Before the tournament

- (Serbia) Novak Djokovic →replaced by (Spain) Pablo Carreño Busta
- (France) Jo-Wilfried Tsonga →replaced by (Russia) Andrey Kuznetsov
- (United States) John Isner →replaced by (Argentina) Guido Pella

== ATP doubles main-draw entrants ==
=== Seeds ===
Country	Player	Country	Player	Rank^{1}	Seed
USA	Bob Bryan	USA	Mike Bryan	13	1
POL	Łukasz Kubot	BRA	Marcelo Melo	27	2
IND	Rohan Bopanna	CAN	Daniel Nestor	32	3
PHI	Treat Huey	BLR	Max Mirnyi	42	4

- Rankings are as of September 26, 2016

=== Other entrants ===
The following pairs received wildcards into the doubles main draw:

- (Germany) Andre Begemann / (India) Leander Paes
- (China) Gong Maoxin / (China) Zhang Ze

The following pair received entry from the qualifying draw:

- (Italy) Paolo Lorenzi / (Argentina) Guido Pella

== WTA singles main-draw entrants ==
=== Seeds ===
Country	Player	Ranking	Seeds
GER	Angelique Kerber	1	1
ESP	Garbiñe Muguruza	3	2
POL	Agnieszka Radwańska	4	3
ROU	Simona Halep	5	4
CZE	Karolína Plíšková	6	5
USA	Venus Williams	7	6
ESP	Carla Suárez Navarro	8	7
USA	Madison Keys	9	8
RUS	Svetlana Kuznetsova	10	9
SVK	Dominika Cibulková	12	10
GBR	Johanna Konta	13	11
SUI	Timea Bacsinszky	14	12
ITA	Roberta Vinci	15	13
CZE	Petra Kvitová	16	14
RUS	Anastasia Pavlyuchenkova	17	15
UKR	Elina Svitolina	18	16

- Rankings are as of September 26, 2016

=== Other entrants ===
The following players received wildcards into the singles main draw:

- (China) Duan Yingying
- (Germany) Sabine Lisicki
- (China) Peng Shuai
- (China) Wang Qiang
- (China) Zheng Saisai

The following players received entry from the qualifying draw:

- (Spain) Lara Arruabarrena
- (United States) Louisa Chirico
- (United States) Nicole Gibbs
- (Germany) Julia Görges
- (Germany) Tatjana Maria
- (United States) Alison Riske
- (Czech Republic) Kateřina Siniaková
- (China) Wang Yafan

=== Withdrawals ===
Before the tournament

- (Netherlands) Kiki Bertens → replaced by (China) Zhang Shuai
- (Canada) Eugenie Bouchard → replaced by (Kazakhstan) Yaroslava Shvedova
- (Italy) Sara Errani → replaced by (Montenegro) Danka Kovinić
- (Germany) Anna-Lena Friedsam → replaced by (Croatia) Mirjana Lučić-Baroni
- (Italy) Karin Knapp → replaced by (United States) Shelby Rogers
- (United States) Sloane Stephens → replaced by (Latvia) Anastasija Sevastova
- (Serbia) Ana Ivanovic → replaced by (United States) Madison Brengle
- (Germany) Andrea Petkovic → replaced by (United States) Christina McHale
- (United States) Serena Williams (shoulder injury) → replaced by (Denmark) Caroline Wozniacki

== WTA doubles main-draw entrants ==
=== Seeds ===
Country	Player	Country	Player	Rank^{1}	Seed
FRA	Caroline Garcia	FRA	Kristina Mladenovic	7	1
RUS	Ekaterina Makarova	RUS	Elena Vesnina	12	2
TPE	Chan Hao-Ching	TPE	Chan Yung-jan	16	3
IND	Sania Mirza	CZE	Barbora Strýcová	19	4
USA	Bethanie Mattek-Sands	CZE	Lucie Šafářová	22	5
CZE	Andrea Hlaváčková	CZE	Lucie Hradecká	23	6
SUI	Martina Hingis	USA	CoCo Vandeweghe	23	7
HUN	Tímea Babos	KAZ	Yaroslava Shvedova	23	8

- ^{1} Rankings are as of September 26, 2016

=== Other entrants ===
The following pairs received wildcards into the doubles main draw:

- (Switzerland) Timea Bacsinszky / (Latvia) Jeļena Ostapenko
- (United States) Christina McHale / (China) Peng Shuai
- (Germany) Laura Siegemund / (Ukraine) Elina Svitolina
- (China) You Xiaodi / (China) Zhu Lin

== Finals ==
=== Men's singles ===
- (United Kingdom) Andy Murray defeated (Bulgaria) Grigor Dimitrov, 6–4, 7–6^{(7–2)}

=== Women's singles ===
- (Poland) Agnieszka Radwańska defeated (United Kingdom) Johanna Konta, 6−4, 6−2

=== Men's doubles ===
- (Spain) Pablo Carreño Busta / (Spain) Rafael Nadal defeated (United States) Jack Sock / (Australia) Bernard Tomic, 6−7^{(6−8)}, 6−2, [10−8]

=== Women's doubles ===
- (United States) Bethanie Mattek-Sands / (Czech Republic) Lucie Šafářová defeated (France) Caroline Garcia / (France) Kristina Mladenovic, 6−4, 6−4
