= 2016 Novak Djokovic tennis season =

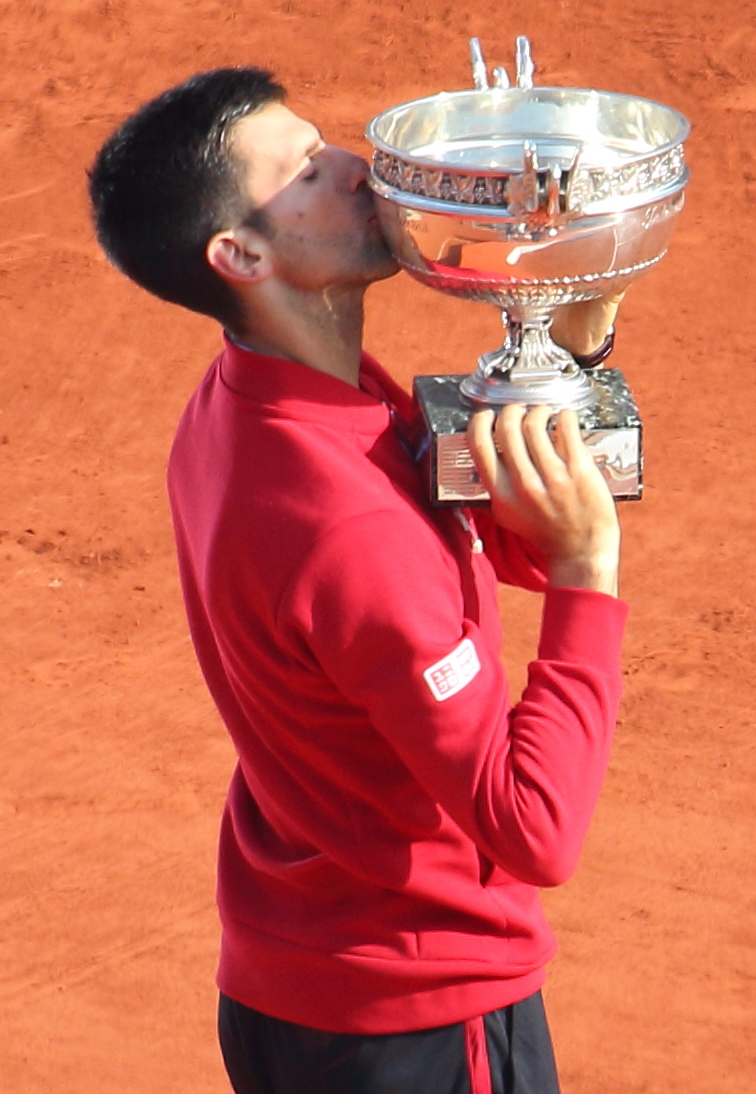
- Djokovic kissing Coupe des Mousquetaires after winning the 2016 French Open, completing "Nole Slam" and his first career Grand Slam
- Full name: Novak Djokovic
- Country: Serbia
- Calendar prize money: $14,138,824 (singles & doubles)

Singles
- Season record: 65–9
- Calendar titles: 7
- Year-end ranking: No. 2
- Ranking change from previous year: ▼1

Grand Slam & significant results
- Australian Open: W
- French Open: W
- Wimbledon: 3R
- US Open: F
- Other tournaments
- Tour Finals: F
- Olympic Games: 1R

Doubles
- Season record: 1–4
- Calendar titles: 0
- Year-end ranking: Unranked
- Ranking change from previous year: Steady

Grand Slam doubles results
- Other Doubles tournaments
- Olympic Games: 2R

Davis Cup
- Davis Cup: QF

Injuries
- Injuries: eye infection problem (following Dubai Open)

The 2016 Novak Djokovic tennis season officially commenced on 4 January with the start of the Qatar ExxonMobil Open.

== Yearly summary ==
=== Australian Open ===
The reigning champion entered the 2016 Australian Open as the top seed. Djokovic started his title defence against Korean Chung Hyeon, defeating the 19-year-old in straight sets (10th consecutive win in first-round Australian Open without dropping a set). Into third round after third-set fightback defeated French teen Quentin Halys. Win in the fourth round of the Italian Andreas Seppi has become the 33rd in a row against Italian opposition (only defeat in his first meeting with an Italian player at 2004 Umag to Filippo Volandri). In his 60th match at the Australian Open, despite 100 unforced errors (new own record, previous value – 75) in five sets, Djokovic into 27th straight Grand Slam quarterfinal, surviving Gilles Simon in four hours, 32 minutes. He then defeated Kei Nishikori in straight sets to reach his sixth Australian Open semifinal.

Djokovic then defeated former champion Roger Federer in four sets, winning the first two sets in 54 minutes combined, to reach his sixth Australian Open final (new record of the Open Era) and 19th Grand slam final (the joint-third highest number of slam finals in the history of tennis). This marks the 17th (5th at a Major) straight tournament final that Djokovic has reached since last January. The victory also gave Djokovic the edge in his head-to-head record against Federer for the first time at 23–22 (he also leads each of the other three members of the Big Four in the head-to-head as well).

In the final, Djokovic captured his sixth Australian Open title by defeating No. 2 Andy Murray in straight sets in just under three hours (57th match-win at the Australian Open and take sole ownership of 2nd place on the list for most Australian Open match-wins in the Open Era) to win his eleventh major title (3rd consecutive win Grand Slam), placing him in equal fifth place on the all-time list with Björn Borg and Rod Laver. His sixth title in Melbourne equals Roy Emerson's record. He also won his seventh (2015 US Open, 2015 Beijing, 2015 Shanghai, 2015 Paris, the 2015 ATP World Tour Finals, 2016 Doha and 2016 Australian Open) consecutive Tour-level title.

=== French Open ===
Djokovic began 16th Grand Slam tournament as the No. 1 seed. It's also the fourth time in five years at the French Open and the eighth consecutive major (the 21st consecutive majors in a Top 2 seed) in which Djokovic has been the top seed. He reached 200 weeks at No. 1 in the ATP rankings (May 23) and also achieved 100 consecutive weeks at No. 1 (May 30) during the tournament.

Djokovic won his first French Open title to complete a career Grand Slam. The Serb defeated Lu Yen-hsun of Chinese Taipei in one hour and 30 minutes to stretch his undefeated streak to 12–0 in first-round play in Paris. Djokovic defeated the Belgian Steve Darcis in 2 hours and 19 minutes to reach the third round of the French Open and earn his 50th win at Roland Garros, becoming just the third player in the Open Era after Roger Federer and Serena Williams to record 50 wins at each of the four Grand Slams. The World No. 1 defeated Britain's Aljaž Bedene in straight sets after just over two hours, in what was more of a fight against time to speed into the last 16. Some days trailing by a set in damp stop-start conditions Djokovic defeated Roberto Bautista Agut in three hours and 16 minutes to reach his 28th successive Grand Slam championship quarter-final. Djokovic progressed to his 30th Grand Slam (6th straight Roland Garros) semi-final with a win over Czech Tomáš Berdych following a controversial rain delay. For the second straight year, a quarter-final victory at Roland Garros guaranteed the 29-year-old Serbian his place in the ATP World Tour Finals and at the same time became the first player in tennis history to earn more than US$100 million in prize money over his 14-season pro career. Djokovic advanced to his fourth Roland Garros final by dispatching Dominic Thiem in one hour and 48 minutes, putting him into his sixth consecutive and 20th overall Grand Slam final. In the final, Djokovic defeated Murray 3–6, 6–1, 6–2, 6–4. With his first French Open title, Djokovic completed the career Grand Slam and became only the third man to hold all four major titles simultaneously and the first since Laver won all four in 1969. Djokovic also became the only man ever to hold all four majors on three different surfaces at the same time (at the time of the previous achievements, the Australian and US Opens were played on grass).

=== Wimbledon ===
Djokovic began his 2016 Wimbledon quest as the two-time defending champion and top seed, and overwhelming favourite. He defeated James Ward and Adrian Mannarino, in straight sets. In the third round, he lost to No. 28 seed Sam Querrey from the United States, ending his grand slam winning streak at 30 matches. The match was played across two days due to numerous rain delays on a then-roofless No. 1 Court. This was Djokovic's first loss in a grand slam before the quarterfinal since the 2009 French Open, and his earliest at Wimbledon since 2008.

=== US Open ===
Djokovic entered the US Open as the defending champion and top seed. After a tough four set victory in the first round, second round walkover and a brief third round match. Djokovic beat Kyle Edmund in straight sets. He defeated Gaël Monfils in the semi-finals in four sets, but in the final, lost to Stan Wawrinka in four sets.

=== ATP World Tour Finals ===
Djokovic was the first player to qualify for the ATP World Tour Finals after reaching the Roland Garros semi-finals (June 2, 2016). Five-time champion (2008, 2012–15) will make 10th appearance (2007–16). After a tough three set victory against Dominic Thiem and a close two set tiebreak against Milos Raonic, Djokovic defeated David Goffin and Kei Nishikori in the round robin stage and semi-finals respectively, both in straight sets. He lost to Andy Murray in the final in straight sets, ending his 2016 season

=== Other tournaments ===
Djokovic for the second consecutive year began the season with a tournament in Doha, Qatar.

==== Qatar Open ====
Djokovic reached the final without losing a set. Novak Djokovic notches first Doha crown, defeating Rafael Nadal in the final in a 73-minute match. This marked his 16th straight final (3rd in Open Era) – and 12th title – since he lost in the Qatar Open quarterfinals last year (l. to Karlović). The world No. 1 capturing his sixth consecutive ATP World Tour title and 60th overall at the tour-level. He became just the 10th player in the Open Era to reach the 60-title milestone. The Djokovic leads the historic Head2Head against Nadal for the first time at 24–23. He has now claimed 11 consecutive sets since Nadal prevailed in the 2014 Roland Garros final. Djokovic (d. Verdasco, 2R and Nadal, F) to reach 18th win in a row vs Spaniards (last loss to Robredo at 2014 Cincinnati, 3R) & 20th straight win vs left-handers (last loss to Nadal at 2014 Roland Garros, F). Also Novak has updated its own record for highest number of points accrued in the ATP rankings – 16,790.

==== Dubai Tennis Championships ====
Four-time tournament champion opened his 10th consecutive Dubai Tennis Championships campaign with convincing win over Tommy Robredo, beating Spaniard in just 66 minutes. Novak Djokovic joined the 700-win club defeating Malek Jaziri in second round in 65 minutes to reach the quarterfinals. He is only the 12th player in the Open Era (since 1968) to hit the 700 singles victories mark, next his coach, Boris Becker (713). In the 479 days since the world No. 1 claimed his 600th match win on 2 November 2014, he has compiled an astonishing 100–6 record. At 28 years, nine months, he is the third active player to pass the milestone, following in the footsteps of his celebrated rivals, Roger Federer (1,067) and Rafael Nadal (775). Djokovic's streak of ATP World Tour finals reached will end at 17 after the world No. 1 retired against Feliciano López in the quarter-finals. Top seed was forced to retire with an eye ailment. The Serb was down 3–6 before retiring, last time Novak retired was 2011 Davis Cup against Juan Martín del Potro, a stretch of 350 matches (318–32).

==== Davis Cup World Group ====
In R1 Djokovic beat Aleksandr Nedovyesov in straight sets in an hour and 53 minutes (1–0). Kazakhstan took a shock 2–1 lead against Serbia in their Davis Cup by BNP Paribas first round tie after Aleksandr Nedovyesov and Andrey Golubev beat former doubles No. 1 Nenad Zimonjić and Novak Djokovic in doubles. Djokovic prevailed in five-hour match against Kazakhstan's Mikhail Kukushkin in five sets and equalized (2–2). Former Davis Cup by BNP Paribas winners Serbia set up a blockbuster quarterfinal tie with holders Great Britain after edging Kazakhstan 3–2 in a titanic tussle.

==== Indian Wells Masters ====
Djokovic started tournament with a tough match against the American Bjorn Fratangelo. The Serb rallied back from a set down to win in three sets. In the next round Novak Djokovic beat Philipp Kohlschreiber in straight sets. The four-time Indian Wells Masters champion is successfully continuing his title-defending journey with a win over Feliciano López in the fourth round, in an hour and 7 minutes. In the quarterfinals Djokovic overcame Jo-Wilfried Tsonga in 2 hours and 6 minutes to set up a blockbuster semifinal at the Indian Wells Tennis Garden. Djokovic continued his winning streak against Rafael Nadal beating him in straight sets to reach the 6th 2016 BNP Paribas Open final for the third straight year in a row. He has now beaten the Spaniard six times in a row, with his last loss coming in the 2014 French Open final. Djokovic has now lifted his record over Nadal to 25–23 (only 2nd (first Boris Becker) man in Open Era to beat one rival 25 times). He has reached 10 straight ATP Masters 1000 finals (DNP 2015 Mutua Madrid Open) since 2014 BNP Paribas Masters, winning 8 titles (50–2 record). In the final Novak Djokovic destroyed Milos Raonic during the 77-minute match, to win his third straight and a record fifth Indian Wells Masters title. Djokovic commits four total unforced errors, rolls to most overwhelming win in ATP Masters 1000 final ever. He now has a 17-match win streak at Indian Wells Masters with the three-peat. His record in the desert is 47–6. The world No. 1 improves his record on the year to 22–1. This marks Djokovic's 27th ATP Masters 1000 crown. He is now tied with Rafael Nadal for the all-time lead. Djokovic is first man to win 20 ATP Masters 1000 (or equivalent) titles on one surface (hard courts). Rafael Nadal has 19 on clay.

Djokovic has more ATP points that Andy Murray No. 2 and Roger Federer No. 3 combined.

==== Miami Open ====
Djokovic began the tournament with a first round bye, and then faced Kyle Edmund in the 2nd Round. Djokovic won easily in two sets. In the third round, Djokovic faced João Sousa. Djokovic again won in two sets. In the fourth round, Djokovic faced up and coming youngster Dominic Thiem. Thiem had already won two titles this year. Djokovic won in two sets. After reaching the fourth round, Djokovic went head to head against Tomáš Berdych. Unsurprisingly, Djokovic won in straight sets. Djokovic faced David Goffin of Belgium. Despite a spirited performance, Djokovic prevailed. In the final, Djokovic faced and beat Kei Nishikori. This was Djokovic's fourth title of the year. It improved his yearly record to 28–1. His one loss was a retirement. This was also the third straight year he won the Sunshine Double, and fourth overall (2011, 2014, 2015, 2016).

==== Monte-Carlo Masters ====
Djokovic began the tournament as the heavy favourite, but was knocked out by Jiří Veselý in the second round. This was his earliest exit in a Masters event in nearly three years, when he was knocked out by Grigor Dimitrov at the 2013 Mutua Madrid Open.

==== Madrid Open ====
Djokovic received a first round bye. In the second round, he beat up and coming youngster Borna Ćorić in straight sets to set up a meeting with Roberto Bautista Agut. Djokovic won in straight sets. Djokovic then had wins against Milos Raonic and Kei Nishikori to make it to the finals. Djokovic would lock horns with Andy Murray for a 33rd time. Djokovic defeated Murray in three sets in a very entertaining match which saw Djokovic save 7 break points in the final game to clinch victory. This victory also set a new record for most Masters 1000 titles with 29.

==== Italian Open ====
Novak Djokovic received a bye in the first round. Djokovic beat qualifier Stéphane Robert and Thomaz Bellucci. He then faced Rafael Nadal for a record 49th time and won in two tight sets. After downing Kei Nishikori in three sets, he faced Andy Murray in the final. It was a disappointment with Murray winning in two sets. This was the 2nd time out of the last 14 matches Murray had beaten Djokovic.

==== Rogers Cup ====
After receiving a bye in the first round, Djokovic started his campaign against Gilles Müller, defeating him in two tight sets. He then faced qualifier Radek Štěpánek in the third round and fifth seed Tomáš Berdych in the quarterfinals, winning both matches in straight sets. In the semifinals, he faced the resurgent Gaël Monfils, defeating him for the 12th time in his career. In the final, he faced 3rd seed Kei Nishikori, defeating him for the 5th time this season with a score of 6−3, 7−5. This was Djokovic's 7th title of the season. It was also his 30th Masters 1000 Series title and 43rd Masters final, breaking away from Roger Federer and Rafael Nadal, who are both on 42 finals.

=== Summer Olympics ===
Hoping to win a gold medal for the first time in his career, Djokovic entered the 2016 Summer Olympics, but lost to Juan Martín del Potro in straight sets. In the doubles he lost in the second round.

=== Shanghai Masters ===
Djokovic received a bye in the first round, Djokovic defeated Fabio Fognini and Vasek Pospisil in straight sets. He defeated Mischa Zverev in three sets, but lost to Roberto Bautista Agut in straight sets.

=== Paris Masters ===
Djokovic received a bye in the first round. He defeated Gilles Müller in straight sets, defeated Grigor Dimitrov in three sets before losing to Marin Čilić in straight sets

== All matches ==
This table lists all the matches of Djokovic this year, including walkovers W/O (they are marked ND for non-decision)

Key
W	F	SF	QF	#R	RR	Q#	P#	DNQ	A	Z#	PO	G	S	B	NMS	NTI	P	NH

(W) winner; (F) finalist; (SF) semifinalist; (QF) quarterfinalist; (#R) rounds 4, 3, 2, 1; (RR) round-robin stage; (Q#) qualification round; (P#) preliminary round; (DNQ) did not qualify; (A) absent; (Z#) Davis/Fed Cup Zonal Group (with number indication) or (PO) play-off; (G) gold, (S) silver or (B) bronze Olympic/Paralympic medal; (NMS) not a Masters tournament; (NTI) not a Tier I tournament; (P) postponed; (NH) not held; (SR) strike rate (events won / competed); (W–L) win–loss record.
To avoid confusion and double counting, these charts are updated at the conclusion of a tournament or when the player's participation has ended.

=== Singles Matches ===
Tournament	Match	Round	Opponent (seed or key)	Rank	Result	Score
Qatar ExxonMobil Open; Doha, Qatar; ATP 250; Hard, outdoor 4 – 10 January 2016
Qatar ExxonMobil Open; Doha, Qatar; ATP 250; Hard, outdoor 4 – 10 January 2016	1 / 833	1R	(Germany) Dustin Brown (Q)	118	Win	6–2, 6–2
Qatar ExxonMobil Open; Doha, Qatar; ATP 250; Hard, outdoor 4 – 10 January 2016	2 / 834	2R	(Spain) Fernando Verdasco	49	Win	6–2, 6–2
Qatar ExxonMobil Open; Doha, Qatar; ATP 250; Hard, outdoor 4 – 10 January 2016	3 / 835	QF	(Argentina) Leonardo Mayer (8)	35	Win	6–3, 7–5
Qatar ExxonMobil Open; Doha, Qatar; ATP 250; Hard, outdoor 4 – 10 January 2016	4 / 836	SF	(Czech Republic) Tomáš Berdych (3)	6	Win	6–3, 7–6^{(7–3)}
Qatar ExxonMobil Open; Doha, Qatar; ATP 250; Hard, outdoor 4 – 10 January 2016	5 / 837	W	(Spain) Rafael Nadal (2)	5	Win (1)	6–1, 6–2
Australian Open; Melbourne, Australia; Grand Slam tournament Hard, outdoor 18 – 31 January 2016
Australian Open; Melbourne, Australia; Grand Slam tournament Hard, outdoor 18 – 31 January 2016	6 / 838	1R	(South Korea) Chung Hyeon	51	Win	6–3, 6–2, 6–4
Australian Open; Melbourne, Australia; Grand Slam tournament Hard, outdoor 18 – 31 January 2016	7 / 839	2R	(France) Quentin Halys (WC)	187	Win	6–1, 6–2, 7–6^{(7–3)}
Australian Open; Melbourne, Australia; Grand Slam tournament Hard, outdoor 18 – 31 January 2016	8 / 840	3R	(Italy) Andreas Seppi (28)	29	Win	6–1, 7–5, 7–6^{(8–6)}
Australian Open; Melbourne, Australia; Grand Slam tournament Hard, outdoor 18 – 31 January 2016	9 / 841	4R	(France) Gilles Simon (14)	15	Win	6–3, 6–7^{(1–7)}, 6–4, 4–6, 6–3
Australian Open; Melbourne, Australia; Grand Slam tournament Hard, outdoor 18 – 31 January 2016	10 / 842	QF	(Japan) Kei Nishikori (7)	7	Win	6–3, 6–2, 6–4
Australian Open; Melbourne, Australia; Grand Slam tournament Hard, outdoor 18 – 31 January 2016	11 / 843	SF	(Switzerland) Roger Federer (3)	3	Win	6–1, 6–2, 3–6, 6–3
Australian Open; Melbourne, Australia; Grand Slam tournament Hard, outdoor 18 – 31 January 2016	12 / 844	W	(United Kingdom) Andy Murray (2)	2	Win (2)	6–1, 7–5, 7–6^{(7–3)}
Dubai Duty Free Tennis Championships; Dubai, United Arab Emirates; ATP 500; Hard, outdoor 22 – 27 February 2016
Dubai Duty Free Tennis Championships; Dubai, United Arab Emirates; ATP 500; Hard, outdoor 22 – 27 February 2016	13 / 845	1R	(Spain) Tommy Robredo	41	Win	6–1, 6–2
Dubai Duty Free Tennis Championships; Dubai, United Arab Emirates; ATP 500; Hard, outdoor 22 – 27 February 2016	14 / 846	2R	(Tunisia) Malek Jaziri (WC)	121	Win	6–1, 6–2
Dubai Duty Free Tennis Championships; Dubai, United Arab Emirates; ATP 500; Hard, outdoor 22 – 27 February 2016	15 / 847	QF	(Spain) Feliciano López (6)	24	Loss	3–6 ret.
Davis Cup by BNP Paribas World Group First Round; Belgrade, Serbia; Davis Cup; Hard, indoor 4 – 6 March 2016
Davis Cup by BNP Paribas World Group First Round; Belgrade, Serbia; Davis Cup; Hard, indoor 4 – 6 March 2016	16 / 848	1R; R1	(Kazakhstan) Aleksandr Nedovyesov	200	Win	6–1, 6–2, 6–3
Davis Cup by BNP Paribas World Group First Round; Belgrade, Serbia; Davis Cup; Hard, indoor 4 – 6 March 2016	17 / 849	1R; R4	(Kazakhstan) Mikhail Kukushkin	79	Win	6–7^{(6–8)}, 7–6^{(7–3)}, 4–6, 6–3, 6–2
BNP Paribas Open; Indian Wells, United States; ATP 1000; Hard, outdoor 10 – 20 March 2016
BNP Paribas Open; Indian Wells, United States; ATP 1000; Hard, outdoor 10 – 20 March 2016	–	1R	Bye			
BNP Paribas Open; Indian Wells, United States; ATP 1000; Hard, outdoor 10 – 20 March 2016	18 / 850	2R	(United States) Bjorn Fratangelo (Q)	149	Win	2–6, 6–1, 6–2
BNP Paribas Open; Indian Wells, United States; ATP 1000; Hard, outdoor 10 – 20 March 2016	19 / 851	3R	(Germany) Philipp Kohlschreiber (27)	30	Win	7–5, 7–5
BNP Paribas Open; Indian Wells, United States; ATP 1000; Hard, outdoor 10 – 20 March 2016	20 / 852	4R	(Spain) Feliciano López (18)	21	Win	6–3, 6–3
BNP Paribas Open; Indian Wells, United States; ATP 1000; Hard, outdoor 10 – 20 March 2016	21 / 853	QF	(France) Jo-Wilfried Tsonga (7)	9	Win	7–6^{(7–2)}, 7–6^{(7–2)}
BNP Paribas Open; Indian Wells, United States; ATP 1000; Hard, outdoor 10 – 20 March 2016	22 / 854	SF	(Spain) Rafael Nadal (4)	5	Win	7–6^{(7–5)}, 6–2
BNP Paribas Open; Indian Wells, United States; ATP 1000; Hard, outdoor 10 – 20 March 2016	23 / 855	W	(Canada) Milos Raonic (12)	14	Win (3)	6–2, 6–0
Miami Open Presented by Itaú; Miami, United States; ATP 1000; Hard, outdoor 23 March – 3 April 2016
Miami Open Presented by Itaú; Miami, United States; ATP 1000; Hard, outdoor 23 March – 3 April 2016	–	1R	Bye			
Miami Open Presented by Itaú; Miami, United States; ATP 1000; Hard, outdoor 23 March – 3 April 2016	24 / 856	2R	(United Kingdom) Kyle Edmund	87	Win	6–3, 6–3
Miami Open Presented by Itaú; Miami, United States; ATP 1000; Hard, outdoor 23 March – 3 April 2016	25 / 857	3R	(Portugal) João Sousa (33)	38	Win	6–4, 6–1
Miami Open Presented by Itaú; Miami, United States; ATP 1000; Hard, outdoor 23 March – 3 April 2016	26 / 858	4R	(Austria) Dominic Thiem (14)	14	Win	6–3, 6–4
Miami Open Presented by Itaú; Miami, United States; ATP 1000; Hard, outdoor 23 March – 3 April 2016	27 / 859	QF	(Czech Republic) Tomáš Berdych (7)	7	Win	6–3, 6–3
Miami Open Presented by Itaú; Miami, United States; ATP 1000; Hard, outdoor 23 March – 3 April 2016	28 / 860	SF	(Belgium) David Goffin (15)	15	Win	7–6^{(7–5)}, 6–4
Miami Open Presented by Itaú; Miami, United States; ATP 1000; Hard, outdoor 23 March – 3 April 2016	29 / 861	W	(Japan) Kei Nishikori (6)	6	Win (4)	6–3, 6–3
Monte-Carlo Rolex Masters; Monte-Carlo, Monaco; ATP 1000; Clay, outdoor 10 – 17 April 2016
Monte-Carlo Rolex Masters; Monte-Carlo, Monaco; ATP 1000; Clay, outdoor 10 – 17 April 2016	–	1R	Bye			
Monte-Carlo Rolex Masters; Monte-Carlo, Monaco; ATP 1000; Clay, outdoor 10 – 17 April 2016	30 / 862	2R	(Czech Republic) Jiří Veselý	55	Loss	4–6, 6–2, 4–6
Mutua Madrid Open; Madrid, Spain; ATP 1000; Clay, outdoor 1 – 8 May 2016
Mutua Madrid Open; Madrid, Spain; ATP 1000; Clay, outdoor 1 – 8 May 2016	–	1R	Bye			
Mutua Madrid Open; Madrid, Spain; ATP 1000; Clay, outdoor 1 – 8 May 2016	31 / 863	2R	(Croatia) Borna Ćorić	40	Win	6–2, 6–4
Mutua Madrid Open; Madrid, Spain; ATP 1000; Clay, outdoor 1 – 8 May 2016	32 / 864	3R	(Spain) Roberto Bautista Agut (15)	17	Win	6–2, 6–1
Mutua Madrid Open; Madrid, Spain; ATP 1000; Clay, outdoor 1 – 8 May 2016	33 / 865	QF	(Canada) Milos Raonic (11)	10	Win	6–3, 6–4
Mutua Madrid Open; Madrid, Spain; ATP 1000; Clay, outdoor 1 – 8 May 2016	34 / 866	SF	(Japan) Kei Nishikori (6)	6	Win	6–3, 7–6^{(7–4)}
Mutua Madrid Open; Madrid, Spain; ATP 1000; Clay, outdoor 1 – 8 May 2016	35 / 867	W	(United Kingdom) Andy Murray (2)	2	Win (5)	6–2, 3–6, 6–3
Internazionali BNL d'Italia; Rome, Italy; ATP 1000; Clay, outdoor 8 – 15 May 2016
Internazionali BNL d'Italia; Rome, Italy; ATP 1000; Clay, outdoor 8 – 15 May 2016	–	1R	Bye			
Internazionali BNL d'Italia; Rome, Italy; ATP 1000; Clay, outdoor 8 – 15 May 2016	36 / 868	2R	(France) Stéphane Robert (Q)	103	Win	7–5, 7–5
Internazionali BNL d'Italia; Rome, Italy; ATP 1000; Clay, outdoor 8 – 15 May 2016	37 / 869	3R	(Brazil) Thomaz Bellucci	37	Win	0–6, 6–3, 6–2
Internazionali BNL d'Italia; Rome, Italy; ATP 1000; Clay, outdoor 8 – 15 May 2016	38 / 870	QF	(Spain) Rafael Nadal (5)	5	Win	7–5, 7–6^{(7–4)}
Internazionali BNL d'Italia; Rome, Italy; ATP 1000; Clay, outdoor 8 – 15 May 2016	39 / 871	SF	(Japan) Kei Nishikori (6)	6	Win	2–6, 6–4, 7–6^{(7–5)}
Internazionali BNL d'Italia; Rome, Italy; ATP 1000; Clay, outdoor 8 – 15 May 2016	40 / 872	F	(United Kingdom) Andy Murray (2)	2	Loss (1)	3–6, 3–6
Roland Garros; Paris, France; Grand Slam tournament Clay, outdoor 22 May – 5 June 2016
Roland Garros; Paris, France; Grand Slam tournament Clay, outdoor 22 May – 5 June 2016	41 / 873	1R	(Chinese Taipei) Lu Yen-hsun	95	Win	6–4, 6–1, 6–1
Roland Garros; Paris, France; Grand Slam tournament Clay, outdoor 22 May – 5 June 2016	42 / 874	2R	(Belgium) Steve Darcis (Q)	161	Win	7–5, 6–3, 6–4
Roland Garros; Paris, France; Grand Slam tournament Clay, outdoor 22 May – 5 June 2016	43 / 875	3R	(United Kingdom) Aljaž Bedene	66	Win	6–2, 6–3, 6–3
Roland Garros; Paris, France; Grand Slam tournament Clay, outdoor 22 May – 5 June 2016	44 / 876	4R	(Spain) Roberto Bautista Agut (14)	16	Win	3–6, 6–4, 6–1, 7–5
Roland Garros; Paris, France; Grand Slam tournament Clay, outdoor 22 May – 5 June 2016	45 / 877	QF	(Czech Republic) Tomáš Berdych (7)	8	Win	6–3, 7–5, 6–3
Roland Garros; Paris, France; Grand Slam tournament Clay, outdoor 22 May – 5 June 2016	46 / 878	SF	(Austria) Dominic Thiem (13)	15	Win	6–2, 6–1, 6–4
Roland Garros; Paris, France; Grand Slam tournament Clay, outdoor 22 May – 5 June 2016	47 / 879	W	(United Kingdom) Andy Murray (2)	2	Win (6)	3–6, 6–1, 6–2, 6–4
Wimbledon Championships; London, United Kingdom; Grand Slam tournament Grass, outdoor 27 June – 10 July 2016
Wimbledon Championships; London, United Kingdom; Grand Slam tournament Grass, outdoor 27 June – 10 July 2016	48 / 880	1R	(United Kingdom) James Ward (WC)	177	Win	6–0, 7–6^{(7–3)}, 6–4
Wimbledon Championships; London, United Kingdom; Grand Slam tournament Grass, outdoor 27 June – 10 July 2016	49 / 881	2R	(France) Adrian Mannarino	55	Win	6–4, 6–3, 7–6^{(7–5)}
Wimbledon Championships; London, United Kingdom; Grand Slam tournament Grass, outdoor 27 June – 10 July 2016	50 / 882	3R	(United States) Sam Querrey (28)	41	Loss	6–7^{(6–8)}, 1–6, 6–3, 6–7^{(5–7)}
Canadian Open; Toronto, Canada; ATP 1000; Hard, outdoor 25 – 31 July 2016
Canadian Open; Toronto, Canada; ATP 1000; Hard, outdoor 25 – 31 July 2016	–	1R	Bye			
Canadian Open; Toronto, Canada; ATP 1000; Hard, outdoor 25 – 31 July 2016	51 / 883	2R	(Luxembourg) Gilles Müller	37	Win	7–5, 7–6^{(7–3)}
Canadian Open; Toronto, Canada; ATP 1000; Hard, outdoor 25 – 31 July 2016	52 / 884	3R	(Czech Republic) Radek Štěpánek (Q)	129	Win	6–2, 6–4
Canadian Open; Toronto, Canada; ATP 1000; Hard, outdoor 25 – 31 July 2016	53 / 885	QF	(Czech Republic) Tomáš Berdych (5)	8	Win	7–6^{(8–6)}, 6–4
Canadian Open; Toronto, Canada; ATP 1000; Hard, outdoor 25 – 31 July 2016	54 / 886	SF	(France) Gaël Monfils (10)	14	Win	6–3, 6–2
Canadian Open; Toronto, Canada; ATP 1000; Hard, outdoor 25 – 31 July 2016	55 / 887	W	(Japan) Kei Nishikori (3)	6	Win (7)	6–3, 7–5
Summer Olympics; Rio de Janeiro, Brazil; Olympics; Hard, outdoor 6 – 14 August 2016
Summer Olympics; Rio de Janeiro, Brazil; Olympics; Hard, outdoor 6 – 14 August 2016	56 / 888	1R	(Argentina) Juan Martín del Potro (PR)	141	Loss	6–7^{(4–7)}, 6–7^{(2–7)}
US Open; New York City, United States; Grand Slam tournament Hard, outdoor 29 August – 11 September 2016
US Open; New York City, United States; Grand Slam tournament Hard, outdoor 29 August – 11 September 2016	57 / 889	1R	(Poland) Jerzy Janowicz (PR)	247	Win	6–3, 5–7, 6–2, 6–1
US Open; New York City, United States; Grand Slam tournament Hard, outdoor 29 August – 11 September 2016	–	2R	(Czech Republic) Jiří Veselý	49	Walkover	N/A
US Open; New York City, United States; Grand Slam tournament Hard, outdoor 29 August – 11 September 2016	58 / 890	3R	(Russia) Mikhail Youzhny	61	Win	4–2 ret.
US Open; New York City, United States; Grand Slam tournament Hard, outdoor 29 August – 11 September 2016	59 / 891	4R	(United Kingdom) Kyle Edmund	84	Win	6–2, 6–1, 6–4
US Open; New York City, United States; Grand Slam tournament Hard, outdoor 29 August – 11 September 2016	60 / 892	QF	(France) Jo-Wilfried Tsonga (9)	11	Win	6–3, 6–2 ret.
US Open; New York City, United States; Grand Slam tournament Hard, outdoor 29 August – 11 September 2016	61 / 893	SF	(France) Gaël Monfils (10)	12	Win	6–3, 6–2, 3–6, 6–2
US Open; New York City, United States; Grand Slam tournament Hard, outdoor 29 August – 11 September 2016	62 / 894	F	(Switzerland) Stan Wawrinka (3)	3	Loss (2)	7–6^{(7–1)}, 4–6, 5–7, 3–6
Shanghai Rolex Masters; Shanghai, China; ATP 1000; Hard, outdoor 10 – 16 October 2016
Shanghai Rolex Masters; Shanghai, China; ATP 1000; Hard, outdoor 10 – 16 October 2016	–	1R	Bye			
Shanghai Rolex Masters; Shanghai, China; ATP 1000; Hard, outdoor 10 – 16 October 2016	63 / 895	2R	(Italy) Fabio Fognini	50	Win	6–3, 6–3
Shanghai Rolex Masters; Shanghai, China; ATP 1000; Hard, outdoor 10 – 16 October 2016	64 / 896	3R	(Canada) Vasek Pospisil (Q)	131	Win	6–4, 6–4
Shanghai Rolex Masters; Shanghai, China; ATP 1000; Hard, outdoor 10 – 16 October 2016	65 / 897	QF	(Germany) Mischa Zverev (Q)	110	Win	3–6, 7–6^{(7–4)}, 6–3
Shanghai Rolex Masters; Shanghai, China; ATP 1000; Hard, outdoor 10 – 16 October 2016	66 / 898	SF	(Spain) Roberto Bautista Agut (15)	19	Loss	4–6, 4–6
BNP Paribas Masters; Paris, France; ATP 1000; Hard, indoor 31 October – 6 November 2016
BNP Paribas Masters; Paris, France; ATP 1000; Hard, indoor 31 October – 6 November 2016	–	1R	Bye			
BNP Paribas Masters; Paris, France; ATP 1000; Hard, indoor 31 October – 6 November 2016	67 / 899	2R	(Luxembourg) Gilles Müller	34	Win	6–3, 6–4
BNP Paribas Masters; Paris, France; ATP 1000; Hard, indoor 31 October – 6 November 2016	68 / 900	3R	(Bulgaria) Grigor Dimitrov (14)	18	Win	4–6, 6–2, 6–3
BNP Paribas Masters; Paris, France; ATP 1000; Hard, indoor 31 October – 6 November 2016	69 / 901	QF	(Croatia) Marin Čilić (9)	10	Loss	4–6, 6–7^{(2–7)}
ATP World Tour Finals; London, United Kingdom; ATP Finals; Hard, indoor 13 – 20 November 2016
ATP World Tour Finals; London, United Kingdom; ATP Finals; Hard, indoor 13 – 20 November 2016	70 / 902	RR	(Austria) Dominic Thiem (8)	9	Win	6–7^{(10–12)}, 6–0, 6–2
ATP World Tour Finals; London, United Kingdom; ATP Finals; Hard, indoor 13 – 20 November 2016	71 / 903	RR	(Canada) Milos Raonic (4)	4	Win	7–6^{(8–6)}, 7–6^{(7–5)}
ATP World Tour Finals; London, United Kingdom; ATP Finals; Hard, indoor 13 – 20 November 2016	72 / 904	RR	(Belgium) David Goffin (Alt)	11	Win	6–1, 6–2
ATP World Tour Finals; London, United Kingdom; ATP Finals; Hard, indoor 13 – 20 November 2016	73 / 905	SF	(Japan) Kei Nishikori (5)	5	Win	6–1, 6–1
ATP World Tour Finals; London, United Kingdom; ATP Finals; Hard, indoor 13 – 20 November 2016	74 / 906	F	(United Kingdom) Andy Murray (1)	1	Loss (3)	3–6, 4–6

=== Doubles matches ===
Tournament	Match	Round	Opponents (seed or key)	Ranks	Result	Score
Davis Cup by BNP Paribas World Group First Round; Belgrade, Serbia; Davis Cup; Hard, indoor 4 – 6 March 2016; Partner: (Serbia) Nenad Zimonjić
Davis Cup by BNP Paribas World Group First Round; Belgrade, Serbia; Davis Cup; Hard, indoor 4 – 6 March 2016; Partner: (Serbia) Nenad Zimonjić	1 / 96	1R; R3	(Kazakhstan) Andrey Golubev / (Kazakhstan) Aleksandr Nedovyesov	#190 / #186	Loss	3–6, 6–7^{(3–7)}, 5–7
Rogers Cup; Toronto, Canada; ATP 1000; Hard, outdoor 25 – 31 July 2016; Partner: (Serbia) Nenad Zimonjić
Rogers Cup; Toronto, Canada; ATP 1000; Hard, outdoor 25 – 31 July 2016; Partner: (Serbia) Nenad Zimonjić	2 / 97	1R	(Canada) Philip Bester / (Canada) Adil Shamasdin (WC)	#234 / #72	Loss	5–7, 6–4, [2–10]
Summer Olympics; Rio de Janeiro, Brazil; Olympics; Hard, outdoor 6 – 14 August 2016; Partner: (Serbia) Nenad Zimonjić
Summer Olympics; Rio de Janeiro, Brazil; Olympics; Hard, outdoor 6 – 14 August 2016; Partner: (Serbia) Nenad Zimonjić	3 / 98	1R	(Croatia) Marin Draganja / (Croatia) Marin Čilić (PR)	#138 / #199	Win	6–2, 6–2
Summer Olympics; Rio de Janeiro, Brazil; Olympics; Hard, outdoor 6 – 14 August 2016; Partner: (Serbia) Nenad Zimonjić	4 / 99	2R	(Brazil) Marcelo Melo / (Brazil) Bruno Soares (3)	#3 / #8	Loss	4–6, 4–6
BNP Paribas Masters; Paris, France; ATP 1000; Hard, indoor 31 October – 6 November 2016; Partner: (Serbia) Nenad Zimonjić
BNP Paribas Masters; Paris, France; ATP 1000; Hard, indoor 31 October – 6 November 2016; Partner: (Serbia) Nenad Zimonjić	5 / 100	1R	(France) Quentin Halys / (France) Adrian Mannarino (WC)	#272 / #102	Loss	3–6, 4–6

=== Exhibition matches ===
Tournament	Match	Round	Opponent (Seed or Key)	Rank	Result	Score
The Boodles Challenge; Stoke Poges, United Kingdom; Singles exhibition Grass, outdoor 21 – 25 June 2016
The Boodles Challenge; Stoke Poges, United Kingdom; Singles exhibition Grass, outdoor 21 – 25 June 2016	1	Day 2	(Belgium) David Goffin	11	Loss	3–6, 5–7

== Tournament schedule ==
=== Singles schedule ===
Date	Tournament	City	Category	Surface	2015 result	2015 points	2016 points	Outcome
04.01–10.01	Qatar Open	Doha	ATP World Tour 250	Hard	QF	45	250	Winner (def. Rafael Nadal, 6–1, 6–2)
18.01–31.01	Australian Open	Melbourne	Grand Slam	Hard	W	2000	2000	Winner (def. Andy Murray, 6–1, 7–5, 7–6^{(7–3)})
22.02–28.02	Dubai Tennis Championships	Dubai	ATP World Tour 500	Hard	F	300	90	Quarterfinals (ret. vs. Feliciano López, 3–6 Ret.)
04.03–06.03	Davis Cup World Group: Serbia vs Kazakhstan	Belgrade	Davis Cup	Hard (i)	QF	40	(0)	First Round: SRB def. (Kazakhstan) KAZ, 3–2; Serbia progresses to WG QF
10.03–20.03	Indian Wells Masters	Indian Wells	ATP World Tour Masters 1000	Hard	W	1000	1000	Winner (def. Milos Raonic, 6–2, 6–0)
21.03–03.04	Miami Open	Miami	ATP World Tour Masters 1000	Hard	W	1000	1000	Winner (def. Kei Nishikori, 6–3, 6–3)
10.04–17.04	Monte-Carlo Masters	Monte-Carlo	ATP World Tour Masters 1000	Clay	W	1000	10	Second round (lost to Jiří Veselý, 4–6, 6–2, 4–6)
01.05–08.05	Madrid Open	Madrid	ATP World Tour Masters 1000	Clay	DNS	0	1000	Winner (def. Andy Murray, 6–2, 3–6, 6–3)
08.05–15.05	Italian Open	Rome	ATP World Tour Masters 1000	Clay	W	1000	600	Final (lost to Andy Murray, 3–6, 3–6)
22.05–05.06	French Open	Paris	Grand Slam	Clay	F	1200	2000	Winner (def. Andy Murray, 3–6, 6–1, 6–2, 6–4)
27.06–10.07	The Championships, Wimbledon	London	Grand Slam	Grass	W	2000	90	Third round (lost to Sam Querrey, 6–7^{(6–8)}, 1–6, 6–3, 6–7^{(5–7)})
25.07–31.07	Canadian Open	Montreal	ATP World Tour Masters 1000	Hard	F	600	1000	Winner (def. Kei Nishikori, 6–3, 7–5)
06.08–14.08	Games of the XXXI Olympiad	Rio de Janeiro	Olympic Games	Hard	NH	0	0	First round (lost to Juan Martín del Potro, 6–7^{(4–7)}, 6–7^{(2–7)})
15.08–21.08	Cincinnati Masters	Cincinnati	ATP World Tour Masters 1000	Hard	F	600	0	Withdrew
29.08–11.09	US Open	New York City	Grand Slam	Hard	W	2000	1200	Final (lost to Stan Wawrinka, 7–6, 4–6, 5–7, 3–6)
03.10–09.10	China Open	Beijing	ATP World Tour 500	Hard	W	500	0	Withdrew
10.10–16.10	Shanghai Masters	Shanghai	ATP World Tour Masters 1000	Hard	W	1000	360	Semifinals (lost to Roberto Bautista Agut, 4−6, 4−6)
31.10–06.11	Paris Masters	Paris	ATP World Tour Masters 1000	Hard (i)	W	1000	180	Quarterfinals (lost to Marin Čilić, 4–6, 6–7^{(2–7)})
14.11–20.11	ATP World Tour Finals	London	ATP World Tour Finals	Hard (i)	W	1300	1000	Final (lost to Andy Murray, 3–6, 4–6)
Race to London points						16585	11780	▼4805 difference
Total year-end points						16585	11780	

=== Doubles schedule ===
Date	Tournament	City	Category	Surface	2015 result	2015 points	2016 points	Outcome
04.01–10.01	Qatar Open	Doha	ATP World Tour 250	Hard	SF	90	0	Withdrew
22.02–28.02	Dubai Tennis Championships	Dubai	ATP World Tour 500	Hard	1R	(0)	0	Withdrew
04.03–06.03	Davis Cup World Group: Serbia vs Kazakhstan	Belgrade	Davis Cup	Hard (i)	QF	50	(0)	First Round: SRB def. (Kazakhstan) KAZ, 3–2; Serbia progresses to WG QF
21.03–03.04	Miami Open	Miami	ATP World Tour Masters 1000	Hard	1R	(0)	0	Withdrew
15.07–17.07	Davis Cup World Group: Serbia vs Great Britain	Belgrade	Davis Cup	Clay	QF	0	0	Withdrew
25.07–31.07	Canadian Open	Montreal	ATP World Tour Masters 1000	Hard	SF	360	(0)	First round (lost to Bester/Shamasdin, 5–7, 6–2, [2–10])
08.08–14.08	Games of the XXXI Olympiad	Rio de Janeiro	Olympic Games	Hard	N/A	N/A	(0)	Second round (lost to Melo/Soares, 4–6, 4–6)
03.10–09.10	China Open	Beijing	ATP World Tour 500	Hard	QF	90	0	Withdrew
Total year-end points						590	0	▼590 difference

== Yearly records ==
=== Head-to-head matchups ===
Novak Djokovic has a 21–4 record against the top 10, 21–3 against the top 11–50, 21–2 against other players; 50–2 against right-handed players and 9–2 against left-handed players.
Ordered by number of wins (Bolded number marks a top 10 player at the time of first match of the year, Italic means top 50; "L" means left-handed player).

- **(Japan) Kei Nishikori** 6–0
- **(Czech Republic) Tomáš Berdych** 4–0
- **(Spain) Rafael Nadal** 3–0
- (Canada) Milos Raonic 3–0
- (Austria) Dominic Thiem 3–0
- **(United Kingdom) Andy Murray** 3–2
- **(France) Jo-Wilfried Tsonga** 2–0
- (France) Gaël Monfils 2–0
- (United Kingdom) Kyle Edmund 2–0
- (Belgium) David Goffin 2–0
- (Spain) Roberto Bautista Agut 2–1
- **(Switzerland) Roger Federer** 1–0
- (Spain) Tommy Robredo 1–0
- (France) Gilles Simon 1–0
- (Spain) Fernando Verdasco (L) 1–0
- (Germany) Philipp Kohlschreiber 1–0
- (Italy) Andreas Seppi 1–0
- (Brazil) Thomaz Bellucci (L) 1–0
- (Argentina) Leonardo Mayer 1–0
- (Portugal) João Sousa 1–0
- (Croatia) Borna Ćorić 1–0
- (Luxembourg) Gilles Müller (L) 1–0
- (Italy) Fabio Fognini 1–0
- (Chinese Taipei) Lu Yen-hsun 1–0
- (Belgium) Steve Darcis 1–0
- (United Kingdom) Aljaž Bedene 1–0
- (Kazakhstan) Mikhail Kukushkin 1–0
- (South Korea) Chung Hyeon 1–0
- (France) Stéphane Robert 1–0
- (Tunisia) Malek Jaziri 1–0
- (Kazakhstan) Aleksandr Nedovyesov 1–0
- (France) Adrian Mannarino (L) 1–0
- (Germany) Dustin Brown 1–0
- (United Kingdom) James Ward 1–0
- (United States) Bjorn Fratangelo 1–0
- (France) Quentin Halys 1–0
- (Czech Republic) Radek Štěpánek 1–0
- (Poland) Jerzy Janowicz 1–0
- (Russia) Mikhail Youzhny 1–0
- (Canada) Vasek Pospisil 1–0
- (Germany) Mischa Zverev (L) 1–0
- (Spain) Feliciano López (L) 1–1
- **(Switzerland) Stan Wawrinka** 0–1
- (United States) Sam Querrey 0–1
- (Czech Republic) Jiří Veselý (L) 0–1 (Note: Djokovic received a walkover in the second round of 2016 US Open after Veselý withdrew due to a forearm inflammation, does not count as a Djokovic win (nor Veselý loss).)
- (Argentina) Juan Martín del Potro 0–1
- (Croatia) Marin Čilić 0–1

=== Finals ===
==== Singles: 10 (7 titles, 3 runner-ups) ====
Category Grand Slam (2–1) Summer Olympic Games (0–0) ATP World Tour Finals (0–1) ATP World Tour Masters 1000 (4–1) ATP World Tour 500 (0–0) ATP World Tour 250 (1–0)	Titles by surface Hard (5–2) Clay (2–1) Grass (0–0)	Titles by conditions Outdoors (7–2) Indoors (0–1)

Result	Date	Tournament	Surface	Opponent	Score
Winner	January 9, 2016	Qatar Open, Qatar	Hard	(Spain) Rafael Nadal	6–1, 6–2
Winner	January 31, 2016	Australian Open, Australia	Hard	(United Kingdom) Andy Murray	6–1, 7–5, 7–6^{(7–3)}
Winner	March 20, 2016	Indian Wells Masters, United States	Hard	(Canada) Milos Raonic	6–2, 6–0
Winner	April 3, 2016	Miami Open, United States	Hard	(Japan) Kei Nishikori	6–3, 6–3
Winner	May 8, 2016	Madrid Open, Spain	Clay	(United Kingdom) Andy Murray	6–2, 3–6, 6–3
Runner-up	May 15, 2016	Italian Open, Italy	Clay	(United Kingdom) Andy Murray	3–6, 3–6
Winner	June 5, 2016	French Open, France	Clay	(United Kingdom) Andy Murray	3–6, 6–1, 6–2, 6–4
Winner	July 31, 2016	Canadian Open, Canada	Hard	(Japan) Kei Nishikori	6–3, 7–5
Runner-up	September 11, 2016	US Open, United States	Hard	(Switzerland) Stan Wawrinka	7–6^{(7–1)}, 4–6, 5–7, 3–6
Runner-up	20 November 2016	ATP World Tour Finals, London, United Kingdom	Hard (i)	(United Kingdom) Andy Murray	3–6, 4–6

=== Earnings ===
- **Bold** font denotes tournament win

#	Venue	Singles Prize Money	Year-to-date
1.	**Qatar ExxonMobil Open**	**$201,165**	$201,165
2.	**Australian Open**	**A$3,400,000**	$2,533,225
3.	Dubai Duty Free Tennis Championships	$59,670	$2,592,895
4.	**BNP Paribas Open**	**$1,028,300**	$3,621,195
5.	**Miami Open Presented by Itaú**	**$1,028,300**	$4,649,495
6.	Monte-Carlo Rolex Masters	€24,640	$4,677,567
7.	**Mutua Madrid Open**	**€912,900**	$5,722,290
8.	Internazionali BNL d'Italia	€351,715	$6,123,350
9.	**Roland Garros**	**€2,000,000**	$8,367,350
10.	Wimbledon Championships	£80,000	$8,476,567
11.	**Rogers Cup**	**$782,525**	$9,259,092
12.	US Open	$1,745,000	$11,009,091
13.	Shanghai Rolex Masters	$257,475	$11,266,566
14.	Paris Masters	€93,680	$11,369,464
15.	ATP World Tour Finals	$1,261,000	$12,630,464
Bonus Pool		$1,500,000	$14,130,464
Doubles			$8,360
**Total**			**$14,138,824**
As of December 26, 2016

- source：
- source：

=== Awards and nominations ===
- Laureus World Sports Award for Sportsman of the Year
- Marca Leyenda

== See also ==
- 2016 ATP World Tour
- 2016 Roger Federer tennis season
- 2016 Rafael Nadal tennis season
- 2016 Andy Murray tennis season
- 2016 Stan Wawrinka tennis season
