= 2016 Rafael Nadal tennis season =

Statistics for Spanish tennis player

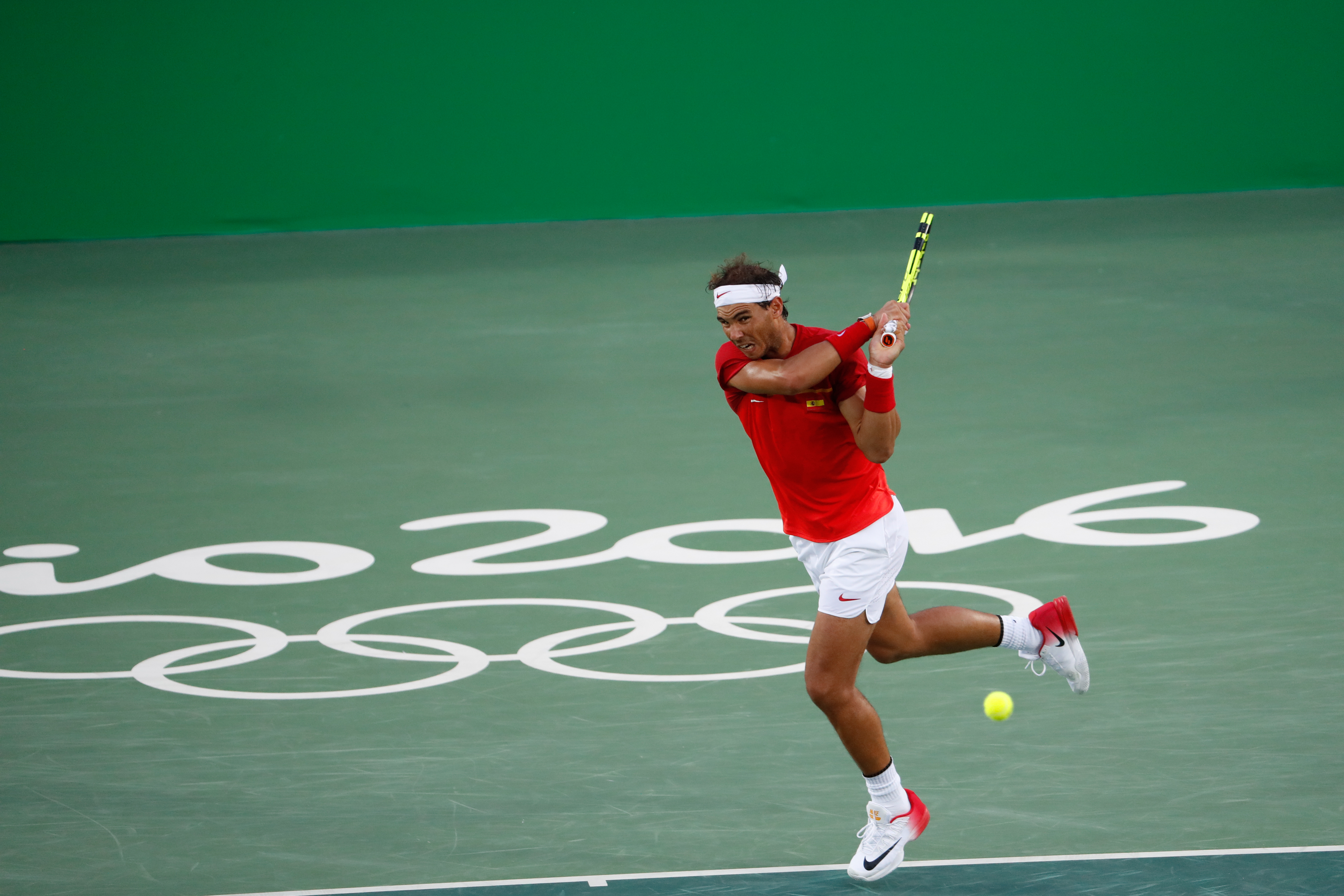
- Full name: Rafael Nadal Parera
- Country: Spain
- Calendar prize money: $2,836,500

Singles
- Season record: 39–14
- Calendar titles: 2
- Year-end ranking: No. 9
- Ranking change from previous year: ▼4

Grand Slam & significant results
- Australian Open: 1R
- French Open: 3R
- Wimbledon: A
- US Open: 4R
- Other tournaments
- Olympic Games: 4th

Doubles
- Season record: 11–2
- Calendar titles: 2
- Current ranking: No. 115
- Ranking change from previous year: ▼29

Grand Slam doubles results
- Other Doubles tournaments
- Olympic Games: G

Injuries
- Injuries: Wrist injury suffered on May 28
- Last updated on: 10 October 2016.

The 2016 Rafael Nadal tennis season officially began on 4 January 2016 with the start of the 2016 Qatar Open.

== Year in detail ==
=== Australian Open Series ===
==== Qatar Open ====
Nadal began his year at the Qatar Open. He faced compatriot Pablo Carreño Busta in the first round and managed a comeback by defeating him in three sets. He then defeated Robin Haase in straight sets but then required three sets to defeat Andrey Kuznetsov in the quarter-finals. Nadal then defeated Illya Marchenko in the semifinals in straight sets to advance to the final, where he faced Novak Djokovic for the title. Nadal was crushed, winning just three games in a straight sets defeat, and thus lost his lead in his head-to-head record against Djokovic for the first time.

==== Australian Open ====
Nadal suffered a shocking defeat in the first round of the 2016 Australian Open at the hands of his compatriot Fernando Verdasco in five gruelling sets. This marked only the second time in his entire professional career that he has lost in the first round of a grand slam singles tournament. The only other first round loss was to Steve Darcis at the 2013 Wimbledon Championships.

=== South American Clay Court Season ===
==== Argentina Open ====
After receiving a bye in the first round, Nadal reached the semifinals of the Argentina Open by defeating Juan Mónaco and Paolo Lorenzi respectively in straight sets. However, he lost to an in-form young-gun Dominic Thiem in the semifinals in three sets after squandering 2 match points.

==== Rio Open ====
Nadal opens his Rio Open campaign by defeating compatriots Pablo Carreño Busta and Nicolás Almagro respectively in straight sets to book his place in the quarterfinals. He got a walkthrough to the semifinals after Alexandr Dolgopolov withdrew due to a right-shoulder injury. He eventually lost to Pablo Cuevas in the semifinals.

=== March Masters ===
==== Indian Wells Masters ====
After receiving a bye in the first round, Nadal recorded his first win after changing back to his old racket against Gilles Müller in three tight sets and booked his place in the fourth round winning his rematch against Fernando Verdasco in straight sets. Nadal reaches the quarterfinals for the second straight year after saving a match point against rising star Alexander Zverev to beat him in three gruelling-sets. He defeated Kei Nishikori in straight sets for his first top 10 win of the season to advance to the semifinals. He lost to Novak Djokovic 7–6, 6–2 in the semifinal after squandering a set point on Djokovic's serve in the first set making their head-to-head record 25–23 in Djokovic's favor.

==== Miami Masters ====
After a bye in the first round, Nadal lost to Damir Džumhur in the second round, retiring in the third set of their match citing dizziness due to the extreme heat at the end of the first set.

=== European Clay Court Season ===
==== Monte-Carlo Masters ====
After receiving a bye in the first round, Nadal defeated Aljaž Bedene in straight sets and faced a more stringent test in the third round against the in-form Dominic Thiem. After two hours on the court, Nadal came out victorious, beating Thiem in straight sets 7–5, 6–3. Nadal reached the semifinals of the Monte Carlo Rolex Masters for the 2nd straight year after a dominant straight sets win in the quarterfinals against 2015 French Open champion Stan Wawrinka. After dropping the first set in the semifinals 2–6 to world #2 Andy Murray, Nadal rallied to beat Murray 6–4, 6–2, upping his head-to-head record against Murray to 17–6. In the final, Nadal defeated an in-form Gaël Monfils in three tough sets, winning 7–5, 5–7, 6–0 to claim his 9th Monte Carlo masters trophy, ending a nearly 2-years Masters 1000 title drought since his last Masters title in Madrid 2014. After leading the Masters 1000 title tally for several years Nadal was surpassed by Novak Djokovic in Miami 2016 but the Monte Carlo win ensures that Nadal is again tied with Djokovic for a record of 28 masters titles.

==== Barcelona Open ====
After a first round bye, Nadal continued his dominant form by dispatching compatriots Marcel Granollers and Albert Montañés in straight sets to proceed to the Quarterfinals. Nadal faced Fabio Fognini who defeated him 3 times the previous year and managed to close out the match in the 2nd set tiebreak in straight sets. Nadal reaches his 101st final beating German Philipp Kohlschreiber in a one-sided contest, winning in straight sets. He defeated two-time defending champion Kei Nishikori in the final 6–4, 7–5, winning the tournament without dropping a single set and winning a record 9th Barcelona Open and equalling the record of most clay court titles won with Guillermo Vilas with 49 clay court titles.

==== Madrid Open ====
After receiving a first round bye, Nadal put on a superb display against Russian Andrey Kuznetsov, beating him in straight sets along with Sam Querrey, dispatching him in a hard-fought straight sets win, nearly going 1–5 down in the first set after fending off a break point in his own serve in the 5th game and then winning 5 straight games to clinch the first set and reach the quarterfinals. Nadal progresses to the semis beating an in-form João Sousa in three-sets despite winning the first set in a bagel. He lost to Andy Murray in the semifinal with a score of 7–5, 6–4.

==== Italian Open ====
Nadal received an unfavorable draw and, after a bye in the first round, Nadal faced Philipp Kohlschreiber and beat him 6–3, 6–3. Nadal then faced Nick Kyrgios who famously beat Nadal at the 2014 Wimbledon and, despite Kyrgios winning the first set in a tiebreak, Nadal won the last 2 sets, breaking Kyrgios 3 times and winning in three sets to book his place in the quarterfinals, where he was beaten by Novak Djokovic in straight sets.

==== French Open ====
Nadal gained a top 4 seeding for his French Open campaign after Federer withdrew with a back injury which guaranteed he won't be meeting Djokovic until the semifinals. Nadal defeated Sam Groth in the first round 6-1 6-1 6–1. In the second round, Nadal defeated Facundo Bagnis. However, Nadal was forced to withdraw a day before his 3rd round match due to a wrist injury.

=== US Open Series ===
==== Rio Olympics ====
Having not played since May 28, Nadal took part in his first competitive match in the Rio Olympic Games. Nadal Faced Argentina's Federico Delbonis. Nadal was in no mood to mess around as he put in an excellent performance, winning 6–2 6–1. In the next round, he faced Andreas Seppi, but beat him in straight sets. Nadal faced Gilles Simon from France, and despite hitting 28 unforced errors in the first set, Nadal came through 7–6 6–3. Nadal then faced home favourite and fellow lefty Thomaz Bellucci. Nadal came through in 3 tough sets. He then faced a resurgent Juan Martín del Potro, the pair last met three years ago. Despite Nadal winning the first set, del Potro fought back to claim victory in an epic olympic semi-final. After the loss to del Potro, Rafa faced Kei Nishikori in the bronze medal match. A visibly exhausted Nadal lost the first set 6–2. He was then 5–2 down in the second, but Nishikori nerves were visible, Nadal levelling 7–6. But in the end, Nishikori was too good, prevailing 6–3 in the third.

Nadal saw more success in the doubles tournament playing alongside Marc López, winning the gold medal. Nadal was also set to play in the mixed doubles alongside Garbiñe Muguruza, but withdrew without playing a match, saying the medical staff advised that three tournaments could aggravate his wrist's recovery.

==== Cincinnati Masters ====
Nadal was defeated in the third round by Borna Ćorić 6–1, 6–3.

==== US Open ====
Entering the tournament as the fourth seed, Nadal advanced to the fourth round but was defeated by 24th seed Lucas Pouille in 5 sets.

=== Asian Swing ===
==== China Open ====
Nadal defeated Paolo Lorenzi and Adrian Mannarino in straight sets, then lost to Grigor Dimitrov in straight sets in the quarterfinals.

==== Shanghai Masters ====
Nadal was defeated in straight sets in his opening round match by Victor Troicki. This was Nadal's final match of the 2016 season.

== All matches ==
Key
W	F	SF	QF	#R	RR	Q#	P#	DNQ	A	Z#	PO	G	S	B	NMS	NTI	P	NH

(W) winner; (F) finalist; (SF) semifinalist; (QF) quarterfinalist; (#R) rounds 4, 3, 2, 1; (RR) round-robin stage; (Q#) qualification round; (P#) preliminary round; (DNQ) did not qualify; (A) absent; (Z#) Davis/Fed Cup Zonal Group (with number indication) or (PO) play-off; (G) gold, (S) silver or (B) bronze Olympic/Paralympic medal; (NMS) not a Masters tournament; (NTI) not a Tier I tournament; (P) postponed; (NH) not held; (SR) strike rate (events won / competed); (W–L) win–loss record.
To avoid confusion and double counting, these charts are updated at the conclusion of a tournament or when the player's participation has ended.

=== Singles matches ===
Tournament	Match	Round	Opponent (seed or key)	Rank	Result	Score
Qatar Open; Doha, Qatar; ATP 250; Hard, outdoor 4–10 January 2016
Qatar Open; Doha, Qatar; ATP 250; Hard, outdoor 4–10 January 2016	1 / 928	1R	(Spain) Pablo Carreño	67	Win	6–7^{(5–7)}, 6–3, 6–1
Qatar Open; Doha, Qatar; ATP 250; Hard, outdoor 4–10 January 2016	2 / 929	2R	(Netherlands) Robin Haase	66	Win	6–3, 6–2
Qatar Open; Doha, Qatar; ATP 250; Hard, outdoor 4–10 January 2016	3 / 930	QF	(Russia) Andrey Kuznetsov	79	Win	6–3, 5–7, 6–4
Qatar Open; Doha, Qatar; ATP 250; Hard, outdoor 4–10 January 2016	4 / 931	SF	(Ukraine) Illya Marchenko	94	Win	6–3, 6–4
Qatar Open; Doha, Qatar; ATP 250; Hard, outdoor 4–10 January 2016	5 / 932	F	(Serbia) Novak Djokovic (1)	1	Loss (1)	1–6, 2–6
Australian Open; Melbourne, Australia; Grand Slam tournament Hard, outdoor 18–31 January 2016
Australian Open; Melbourne, Australia; Grand Slam tournament Hard, outdoor 18–31 January 2016	6 / 933	1R	(Spain) Fernando Verdasco	47	Loss	6–7^{(6–8)}, 6–4, 6–3, 6–7^{(4–7)}, 2–6
Argentina Open; Buenos Aires, Argentina; ATP 250; Clay, outdoor 8–14 February 2016
Argentina Open; Buenos Aires, Argentina; ATP 250; Clay, outdoor 8–14 February 2016	–	1R	Bye			
Argentina Open; Buenos Aires, Argentina; ATP 250; Clay, outdoor 8–14 February 2016	7 / 934	2R	(Argentina) Juan Mónaco	55	Win	6–4, 6–4
Argentina Open; Buenos Aires, Argentina; ATP 250; Clay, outdoor 8–14 February 2016	8 / 935	QF	(Italy) Paolo Lorenzi	52	Win	7–6^{(7–3)}, 6–2
Argentina Open; Buenos Aires, Argentina; ATP 250; Clay, outdoor 8–14 February 2016	9 / 936	SF	(Austria) Dominic Thiem (5)	19	Loss	4–6, 6–4, 6–7^{(4–7)}
Rio Open; Rio de Janeiro, Brazil; ATP 500; Clay, outdoor 15–21 February 2016
Rio Open; Rio de Janeiro, Brazil; ATP 500; Clay, outdoor 15–21 February 2016	10 / 937	1R	(Spain) Pablo Carreño	66	Win	6–1, 6–4
Rio Open; Rio de Janeiro, Brazil; ATP 500; Clay, outdoor 15–21 February 2016	11 / 938	2R	(Spain) Nicolás Almagro	53	Win	6–3, 7–5
Rio Open; Rio de Janeiro, Brazil; ATP 500; Clay, outdoor 15–21 February 2016	–	QF	(Ukraine) Alexandr Dolgopolov	33	Walkover	N/A
Rio Open; Rio de Janeiro, Brazil; ATP 500; Clay, outdoor 15–21 February 2016	12 / 939	SF	(Uruguay) Pablo Cuevas	45	Loss	7–6^{(8–6)}, 6–7^{(3–7)}, 4–6
BNP Paribas Open; Indian Wells, United States; ATP 1000; Hard, outdoor 10–20 March 2016
BNP Paribas Open; Indian Wells, United States; ATP 1000; Hard, outdoor 10–20 March 2016	–	1R	Bye			
BNP Paribas Open; Indian Wells, United States; ATP 1000; Hard, outdoor 10–20 March 2016	13 / 940	2R	(Luxembourg) Gilles Müller	45	Win	6–2, 2–6, 6–4
BNP Paribas Open; Indian Wells, United States; ATP 1000; Hard, outdoor 10–20 March 2016	14 / 941	3R	(Spain) Fernando Verdasco	65	Win	6–0, 7–6^{(11–9)}
BNP Paribas Open; Indian Wells, United States; ATP 1000; Hard, outdoor 10–20 March 2016	15 / 942	4R	(Germany) Alexander Zverev	58	Win	6–7^{(8–10)}, 6–0, 7–5
BNP Paribas Open; Indian Wells, United States; ATP 1000; Hard, outdoor 10–20 March 2016	16 / 943	QF	(Japan) Kei Nishikori (5)	6	Win	6–4, 6–3
BNP Paribas Open; Indian Wells, United States; ATP 1000; Hard, outdoor 10–20 March 2016	17 / 944	SF	(Serbia) Novak Djokovic (1)	1	Loss	6–7^{(5–7)}, 2–6
Miami Open; Miami, United States; ATP 1000; Hard, outdoor 24 March – 3 April 2016
Miami Open; Miami, United States; ATP 1000; Hard, outdoor 24 March – 3 April 2016	–	1R	Bye			
Miami Open; Miami, United States; ATP 1000; Hard, outdoor 24 March – 3 April 2016	18 / 945	2R	(Bosnia and Herzegovina) Damir Džumhur	94	Loss	6–2, 4–6, 0–3 ret.
Monte-Carlo Masters; Monte-Carlo, Monaco; ATP 1000; Clay, outdoor 11–17 April 2016
Monte-Carlo Masters; Monte-Carlo, Monaco; ATP 1000; Clay, outdoor 11–17 April 2016	–	1R	Bye			
Monte-Carlo Masters; Monte-Carlo, Monaco; ATP 1000; Clay, outdoor 11–17 April 2016	19 / 946	2R	(United Kingdom) Aljaž Bedene	60	Win	6–3, 6–3
Monte-Carlo Masters; Monte-Carlo, Monaco; ATP 1000; Clay, outdoor 11–17 April 2016	20 / 947	3R	(Austria) Dominic Thiem (12)	14	Win	7–5, 6–3
Monte-Carlo Masters; Monte-Carlo, Monaco; ATP 1000; Clay, outdoor 11–17 April 2016	21 / 948	QF	(Switzerland) Stan Wawrinka (4)	4	Win	6–1, 6–4
Monte-Carlo Masters; Monte-Carlo, Monaco; ATP 1000; Clay, outdoor 11–17 April 2016	22 / 949	SF	(United Kingdom) Andy Murray (2)	2	Win	2–6, 6–4, 6–2
Monte-Carlo Masters; Monte-Carlo, Monaco; ATP 1000; Clay, outdoor 11–17 April 2016	23 / 950	W	(France) Gaël Monfils (13)	16	Win (1)	7–5, 5–7, 6–0
Barcelona Open; Barcelona, Spain; ATP 500; Clay, outdoor 18–24 April 2016
Barcelona Open; Barcelona, Spain; ATP 500; Clay, outdoor 18–24 April 2016	–	1R	Bye			
Barcelona Open; Barcelona, Spain; ATP 500; Clay, outdoor 18–24 April 2016	24 / 951	2R	(Spain) Marcel Granollers	50	Win	6–3, 6–2
Barcelona Open; Barcelona, Spain; ATP 500; Clay, outdoor 18–24 April 2016	25 / 952	3R	(Spain) Albert Montañés	104	Win	6–2, 6–2
Barcelona Open; Barcelona, Spain; ATP 500; Clay, outdoor 18–24 April 2016	26 / 953	QF	(Italy) Fabio Fognini (12)	31	Win	6–2, 7–6^{(7–1)}
Barcelona Open; Barcelona, Spain; ATP 500; Clay, outdoor 18–24 April 2016	27 / 954	SF	(Germany) Philipp Kohlschreiber (10)	27	Win	6–3, 6–3
Barcelona Open; Barcelona, Spain; ATP 500; Clay, outdoor 18–24 April 2016	28 / 955	W	(Japan) Kei Nishikori (2)	6	Win (2)	6–4, 7–5
Madrid Open; Madrid, Spain; ATP 1000; Clay,outdoor; 1–8 May 2016
Madrid Open; Madrid, Spain; ATP 1000; Clay,outdoor; 1–8 May 2016	–	1R	Bye			
Madrid Open; Madrid, Spain; ATP 1000; Clay,outdoor; 1–8 May 2016	29 / 956	2R	(Russia) Andrey Kuznetsov	39	Win	6–3, 6–3
Madrid Open; Madrid, Spain; ATP 1000; Clay,outdoor; 1–8 May 2016	30 / 957	3R	(United States) Sam Querrey	37	Win	6–4, 6–2
Madrid Open; Madrid, Spain; ATP 1000; Clay,outdoor; 1–8 May 2016	31 / 958	QF	(Portugal) João Sousa	35	Win	6–0, 4–6, 6–3
Madrid Open; Madrid, Spain; ATP 1000; Clay,outdoor; 1–8 May 2016	32 / 959	SF	(United Kingdom) Andy Murray (2)	2	Loss	5–7, 4–6
Italian Open; Rome, Italy; ATP 1000; Clay,outdoor; 9–15 May 2016
Italian Open; Rome, Italy; ATP 1000; Clay,outdoor; 9–15 May 2016	–	1R	Bye			
Italian Open; Rome, Italy; ATP 1000; Clay,outdoor; 9–15 May 2016	33 / 960	2R	(Germany) Philipp Kohlschreiber	26	Win	6–3, 6–3
Italian Open; Rome, Italy; ATP 1000; Clay,outdoor; 9–15 May 2016	34 / 961	3R	(Australia) Nick Kyrgios	20	Win	6–7^{(3–7)}, 6–2, 6–4
Italian Open; Rome, Italy; ATP 1000; Clay,outdoor; 9–15 May 2016	35 / 962	QF	(Serbia) Novak Djokovic (1)	1	Loss	5–7, 6–7^{(4–7)}
French Open; Paris, France; Grand Slam tournament Clay,outdoor; 22 May – 5 June 2016
French Open; Paris, France; Grand Slam tournament Clay,outdoor; 22 May – 5 June 2016	36 / 963	1R	(Australia) Sam Groth	95	Win	6–1, 6–1, 6–1
French Open; Paris, France; Grand Slam tournament Clay,outdoor; 22 May – 5 June 2016	37 / 964	2R	(Argentina) Facundo Bagnis	99	Win	6–3, 6–0, 6–3
French Open; Paris, France; Grand Slam tournament Clay,outdoor; 22 May – 5 June 2016	–	3R	(Spain) Marcel Granollers	56	Withdrew	N/A
Summer Olympics; Rio de Janeiro, Brazil; Olympics; Hard, outdoor 6–14 August 2016
Summer Olympics; Rio de Janeiro, Brazil; Olympics; Hard, outdoor 6–14 August 2016	38 / 965	1R	(Argentina) Federico Delbonis	43	Win	6–2, 6–1
Summer Olympics; Rio de Janeiro, Brazil; Olympics; Hard, outdoor 6–14 August 2016	39 / 966	2R	(Italy) Andreas Seppi	74	Win	6–3, 6–3
Summer Olympics; Rio de Janeiro, Brazil; Olympics; Hard, outdoor 6–14 August 2016	40 / 967	3R	(France) Gilles Simon (15)	31	Win	7–6^{(7–5)}, 6–3
Summer Olympics; Rio de Janeiro, Brazil; Olympics; Hard, outdoor 6–14 August 2016	41 / 968	QF	(Brazil) Thomaz Bellucci	54	Win	2–6, 6–4, 6–2
Summer Olympics; Rio de Janeiro, Brazil; Olympics; Hard, outdoor 6–14 August 2016	42 / 969	SF	(Argentina) Juan Martín del Potro	165	Loss	7–5, 4–6, 6–7^{(5–7)}
Summer Olympics; Rio de Janeiro, Brazil; Olympics; Hard, outdoor 6–14 August 2016	43 / 970	SF-B	(Japan) Kei Nishikori	7	Loss	2–6, 7–6^{(7–1)}, 3–6
Cincinnati Masters; Cincinnati, United States; ATP 1000; Hard, outdoor 13–21 August 2016
Cincinnati Masters; Cincinnati, United States; ATP 1000; Hard, outdoor 13–21 August 2016	–	1R	Bye			
Cincinnati Masters; Cincinnati, United States; ATP 1000; Hard, outdoor 13–21 August 2016	44 / 971	2R	(Uruguay) Pablo Cuevas	19	Win	6–1, 7–6^{(7–4)}
Cincinnati Masters; Cincinnati, United States; ATP 1000; Hard, outdoor 13–21 August 2016	45 / 972	3R	(Croatia) Borna Ćorić	49	Loss	1–6, 3–6
US Open; New York City, United States; Grand Slam tournament Hard, outdoor 29–11 September 2016
US Open; New York City, United States; Grand Slam tournament Hard, outdoor 29–11 September 2016	46 / 973	1R	(Uzbekistan) Denis Istomin	107	Win	6–1, 6–4, 6–2
US Open; New York City, United States; Grand Slam tournament Hard, outdoor 29–11 September 2016	47 / 974	2R	(Italy) Andreas Seppi	87	Win	6–0, 7–5, 6–1
US Open; New York City, United States; Grand Slam tournament Hard, outdoor 29–11 September 2016	48 / 975	3R	(Russia) Andrey Kuznetsov	47	Win	6–1, 6–4, 6–2
US Open; New York City, United States; Grand Slam tournament Hard, outdoor 29–11 September 2016	49 / 976	4R	(France) Lucas Pouille (24)	25	Loss	1–6, 6–2, 4–6, 6–3, 6–7^{(6–8)}
China Open; Beijing, China; ATP 500; Hard, outdoor 3–9 October 2016
China Open; Beijing, China; ATP 500; Hard, outdoor 3–9 October 2016	50 / 977	1R	(Italy) Paolo Lorenzi	39	Win	6–1, 6–1
China Open; Beijing, China; ATP 500; Hard, outdoor 3–9 October 2016	51 / 978	2R	(France) Adrian Mannarino (Q)	64	Win	6–1, 7–6^{(8–6)}
China Open; Beijing, China; ATP 500; Hard, outdoor 3–9 October 2016	52 / 979	QF	(Bulgaria) Grigor Dimitrov	20	Loss	2–6, 4–6
Shanghai Masters; Shanghai, China; ATP 1000; Hard, outdoor 10–16 October 2016
Shanghai Masters; Shanghai, China; ATP 1000; Hard, outdoor 10–16 October 2016	–	1R	Bye			
Shanghai Masters; Shanghai, China; ATP 1000; Hard, outdoor 10–16 October 2016	53 / 980	2R	(Serbia) Viktor Troicki	31	Loss	3–6, 6–7^{(3–7)}

=== Doubles matches ===
Tournament	Match	Round	Opponents (seed or key)	Ranks	Result	Score
Qatar Open; Doha, Qatar; ATP 250; Hard, outdoor 4–10 January 2016; Partner: (Spain) Fernando Verdasco
Qatar Open; Doha, Qatar; ATP 250; Hard, outdoor 4–10 January 2016; Partner: (Spain) Fernando Verdasco	1 / 188	1R	(Russia) Teymuraz Gabashvili / (Spain) Albert Ramos	#130 / #605	Loss	7–6^{(7–3)}, 4–6, [9–11]
BNP Paribas Open; Indian Wells, United States; ATP 1000; Hard, outdoor 10–20 March 2016; Partner: (Spain) Fernando Verdasco
BNP Paribas Open; Indian Wells, United States; ATP 1000; Hard, outdoor 10–20 March 2016; Partner: (Spain) Fernando Verdasco	2 / 189	1R	(United States) Bob Bryan / (United States) Mike Bryan	#5 / #6	Loss	6–3, 5–7, [8–10]
Miami Open; Miami, United States; ATP 1000; Hard, outdoor 24 March – 3 April 2016; Partner: (Spain) Fernando Verdasco
Miami Open; Miami, United States; ATP 1000; Hard, outdoor 24 March – 3 April 2016; Partner: (Spain) Fernando Verdasco	3 / 190	1R	(Italy) Simone Bolelli / (Italy) Andreas Seppi	#22 / #80	Win	6–3, 6–4
Miami Open; Miami, United States; ATP 1000; Hard, outdoor 24 March – 3 April 2016; Partner: (Spain) Fernando Verdasco	–	2R	(United States) John Isner / (United States) Nicholas Monroe	#120 / #53	Withdrew	N/A
Monte-Carlo Rolex Masters; Roquebrune-Cap-Martin, Monaco; ATP 1000; Clay, outdoor 9–17 April 2016; Partner: (Spain) Fernando Verdasco
Monte-Carlo Rolex Masters; Roquebrune-Cap-Martin, Monaco; ATP 1000; Clay, outdoor 9–17 April 2016; Partner: (Spain) Fernando Verdasco	4 / 191	1R	(Germany) Philipp Kohlschreiber / (Serbia) Viktor Troicki	#250 / #177	Win	6–4, 6–2
Monte-Carlo Rolex Masters; Roquebrune-Cap-Martin, Monaco; ATP 1000; Clay, outdoor 9–17 April 2016; Partner: (Spain) Fernando Verdasco	–	2R	(France) Pierre-Hugues Herbert / (France) Nicolas Mahut	#8 / #5	Withdrew	N/A
Summer Olympics; Rio de Janeiro, Brazil; Olympics; Hard, outdoor 6–14 August 2016; Partner: (Spain) Marc López
Summer Olympics; Rio de Janeiro, Brazil; Olympics; Hard, outdoor 6–14 August 2016; Partner: (Spain) Marc López	5 / 192	1R	(Netherlands) Robin Haase / (Netherlands) Jean-Julien Rojer	#14 / #157	Win	6–4, 6–4
Summer Olympics; Rio de Janeiro, Brazil; Olympics; Hard, outdoor 6–14 August 2016; Partner: (Spain) Marc López	6 / 193	2R	(Argentina) Máximo González / (Argentina) Juan Martín del Potro	#73 / #351	Win	6–3, 5–7, 6–2
Summer Olympics; Rio de Janeiro, Brazil; Olympics; Hard, outdoor 6–14 August 2016; Partner: (Spain) Marc López	7 / 194	QF	(Austria) Alexander Peya / (Austria) Oliver Marach	#23 / #37	Win	6–3, 6–1
Summer Olympics; Rio de Janeiro, Brazil; Olympics; Hard, outdoor 6–14 August 2016; Partner: (Spain) Marc López	8 / 195	SF	(Canada) Daniel Nestor / (Canada) Vasek Pospisil	#9 / #17	Win	7–6^{(7–1)}, 7–6^{(7–4)}
Summer Olympics; Rio de Janeiro, Brazil; Olympics; Hard, outdoor 6–14 August 2016; Partner: (Spain) Marc López	9 / 196	G	(Romania) Horia Tecău / (Romania) Florin Mergea	#10 / #14	Win (1)	6–2, 3–6, 6–4
Davis Cup World Group; Playoff: India vs Spain; New Delhi, India; Davis Cup; Hard, outdoor 16–18 September 2016; Partner: (Spain) Marc López
Davis Cup World Group; Playoff: India vs Spain; New Delhi, India; Davis Cup; Hard, outdoor 16–18 September 2016; Partner: (Spain) Marc López	10 / 197	1R	(India) Saketh Myneni / (India) Leander Paes	#119 / #63	Win	4–6, 7–6^{(7–2)}, 6–4, 6–4
China Open; Beijing, China; ATP 500; Hard, outdoor 3–9 October 2016; Partner: (Spain) Pablo Carreño Busta
China Open; Beijing, China; ATP 500; Hard, outdoor 3–9 October 2016; Partner: (Spain) Pablo Carreño Busta	11 / 198	1R	(India) Rohan Bopanna / (Canada) Daniel Nestor (3)	#18 / #14	Win	7–6^{(7–3)}, 6–4
China Open; Beijing, China; ATP 500; Hard, outdoor 3–9 October 2016; Partner: (Spain) Pablo Carreño Busta	12 / 199	QF	(China) Gong Maoxin / (China) Zhang Ze (WC)	#105 / #144	Win	7–5, 6–3
China Open; Beijing, China; ATP 500; Hard, outdoor 3–9 October 2016; Partner: (Spain) Pablo Carreño Busta	13 / 200	SF	(United States) Bob Bryan / (United States) Mike Bryan (1)	#6 / #7	Win	7–5, 6–4
China Open; Beijing, China; ATP 500; Hard, outdoor 3–9 October 2016; Partner: (Spain) Pablo Carreño Busta	14 / 201	W	(United States) Jack Sock / (Australia) Bernard Tomic	#22 / #230	Win (2)	6–7^{(6–8)}, 6–2, [10–8]

=== Mixed doubles matches ===
Tournament	Match	Round	Opponents (seed or key)	Ranks	Result	Score
2016 Summer Olympics; Rio de Janeiro, Brazil; Olympics; Hard, outdoor 8–14 August 2016; Partner: (Spain) Garbiñe Muguruza
2016 Summer Olympics; Rio de Janeiro, Brazil; Olympics; Hard, outdoor 8–14 August 2016; Partner: (Spain) Garbiñe Muguruza	–	1R	(Czech Republic) Lucie Hradecká / (Czech Republic) Radek Štěpánek (IP)	#10 / #31	Withdrew	N/A

=== Exhibition matches ===
Tournament	Match	Round	Opponents (Seed or Key)	Rank	Result	Score
Mubadala World Tennis Championship; Abu Dhabi, United Arab Emirates; Singles exhibition Hard, outdoor 31 December 2015 – 2 January 2016
Mubadala World Tennis Championship; Abu Dhabi, United Arab Emirates; Singles exhibition Hard, outdoor 31 December 2015 – 2 January 2016	–	QF	Bye			
Mubadala World Tennis Championship; Abu Dhabi, United Arab Emirates; Singles exhibition Hard, outdoor 31 December 2015 – 2 January 2016	1	SF	(Spain) David Ferrer (3)	7	Win	6–3, 6–7^{(4–7)}, 6–3
Mubadala World Tennis Championship; Abu Dhabi, United Arab Emirates; Singles exhibition Hard, outdoor 31 December 2015 – 2 January 2016	2	W	(Canada) Milos Raonic (6)	14	Win (1)	7–6^{(7–2)}, 6–3

== Tournament schedule ==
=== Singles schedule ===
Nadal's 2016 singles tournament schedule is as follows: (Bolded letter indicates better or same result at the tournament)

Date	Tournament	Location	Category	Surface^{1}	Outcome 2015	Outcome 2016	Prev. Pts	New Pts^{2}
04 – 10 Jan 2016	Qatar Open	Doha, Qatar	ATP World Tour 250	Hard	1R	**F**	0	150
18–31 Jan 2016	Australian Open	Melbourne, Australia	Grand Slam	Hard	**QF**	1R	360	10
8–14 Feb 2016	Argentina Open	Buenos Aires, Argentina	ATP World Tour 250	Clay	**W**	SF	250	90
15–21 Feb 2016	Rio Open	Rio de Janeiro, Brazil	ATP World Tour 500	Clay	SF	**SF**	180	180
10–20 Mar 2016	Indian Wells Masters	Indian Wells, United States	ATP World Tour Masters 1000	Hard	QF	**SF**	180	360
24 Mar – 3 April 2016	Miami Masters	Miami, United States	ATP World Tour Masters 1000	Hard	**3R**	2R	45	10
9–17 April 2016	Monte-Carlo Rolex Masters	Roquebrune-Cap-Martin, Monaco	ATP World Tour Masters 1000	Clay	SF	**W**	360	1000
16–24 April 2016	Barcelona Open	Barcelona, Spain	ATP World Tour 500	Clay	3R	**W**	45	500
29 April – 8 May 2016	Madrid Open	Madrid, Spain	ATP World Tour Masters 1000	Clay	**F**	SF	600	360
9–15 May 2016	Italian Open	Rome, Italy	ATP World Tour Masters 1000	Clay	QF	**QF**	180	180
16 May – 5 June 2016	French Open	Paris, France	Grand Slam	Clay	**QF**	3R	360	90
4–12 June 2016	Stuttgart Open	Stuttgart, Germany	ATP World Tour 250	Grass	**W**	DNP	250	0
13–19 June 2016	Queen's Club Championships	London, United Kingdom	ATP World Tour 500	Grass	**1R**	DNP	0	0
27 June – 10 July 2016	Wimbledon Championships	London, United Kingdom	Grand Slam	Grass	2R	DNP	45	0
9–17 July 2016	German Open	Hamburg, Germany	ATP World Tour 500	Clay	**W**	DNP	500	0
23–31 July 2016	Canadian Open	Montreal, Canada	ATP World Tour Masters 1000	Hard	**QF**	DNP	180	0
4–14 Aug 2016	Olympic Games	Rio de Janeiro, Brazil		Hard	N/A	**SF-B**	0	0
13–21 Aug 2016	Cincinnati Masters	Cincinnati, United States	ATP World Tour Masters 1000	Hard	**3R**	**3R**	90	90
29 Aug – 11 Sep 2016	US Open	New York City, United States	Grand Slam	Hard	3R	**4R**	90	180
3–9 Oct 2016	China Open	Beijing, China	ATP World Tour 500	Hard	**F**	QF	300	90
8–16 Oct 2016	Shanghai Masters	Shanghai, China	ATP World Tour Masters 1000	Hard	**SF**	2R	360	10
24–30 Oct 2016	Swiss Indoors	Basel, Switzerland	ATP World Tour 500	Hard (i)	F		300	0
31 Oct – 6 Nov 2016	Paris Masters	Paris, France	ATP World Tour Masters 1000	Hard (i)	**QF**		180	0
13–20 Nov 2016	ATP World Tour Finals	London, United Kingdom	ATP World Tour Finals	Hard (i)	**SF**		600	0
Total							5230	3300

^{1} The symbol (i) = indoors means that the respective tournament will be held indoors.

^{2} The ATP numbers between brackets = non-countable tournaments.

== Yearly records ==
=== Head-to-head matchups ===
Rafael Nadal has a 39–14 match win–loss record in the 2016 season. His record against players who were part of the ATP rankings Top Ten at the time of their meetings was 4–5. The following list is ordered by number of wins: (Bolded number marks a top 10 player at the time of match, Italic means top 30)

- (Russia) Andrey Kuznetsov 3–0
- (Germany) Philipp Kohlschreiber 2–0
- (Spain) Pablo Carreño 2–0
- (Italy) Andreas Seppi 2–0
- (Italy) Paolo Lorenzi 2–0
- (Japan) **Kei Nishikori** 2–1
- (Switzerland) **Stan Wawrinka** 1–0
- (Australia) Nick Kyrgios 1–0
- (France) Gaël Monfils 1–0
- (France) Gilles Simon 1–0
- (Argentina) Federico Delbonis 1–0
- (Portugal) João Sousa 1–0
- (Italy) Fabio Fognini 1–0
- (United Kingdom) Aljaž Bedene 1–0
- (Luxembourg) Gilles Müller 1–0
- (Germany) Alexander Zverev 1–0
- (Spain) Nicolás Almagro 1–0
- (Australia) Sam Groth 1–0
- (Argentina) Facundo Bagnis 1–0
- (Spain) Albert Montañés 1–0
- (Spain) Marcel Granollers 1–0
- (Netherlands) Robin Haase 1–0
- (Argentina) Juan Mónaco 1–0
- (United States) Sam Querrey 1–0
- (Ukraine) Illya Marchenko 1–0
- (Uzbekistan) Denis Istomin 1–0
- (France) Adrian Mannarino 1–0
- (United Kingdom) **Andy Murray** 1–1
- (Austria) Dominic Thiem 1–1
- (Spain) Fernando Verdasco 1–1
- (Uruguay) Pablo Cuevas 1–1
- (Croatia) Borna Ćorić 0–1
- (Bosnia and Herzegovina) Damir Džumhur 0–1
- (France) Lucas Pouille 0-1
- (Bulgaria) Grigor Dimitrov 0–1
- (Serbia) Viktor Troicki 0–1
- (Serbia) **Novak Djokovic** 0–3

=== Finals ===
==== Singles: 3 (2–1) ====
Category Grand Slam (0–0) Summer Olympic Games (0–0) ATP World Tour Finals (0–0) ATP World Tour Masters 1000 (1–0) ATP World Tour 500 (1–0) ATP World Tour 250 (0–1)	Titles by surface Hard (0–1) Clay (2–0) Grass (0–0)	Titles by conditions Outdoors (2–1) Indoors (0–0)

Outcome	Date	Tournament	Surface	Opponent in the final	Score in the final
Runner-up	10 January 2016	Qatar Open, Doha, Qatar	Hard	(Serbia) Novak Djokovic	1–6, 2–6
Winner	17 April 2016	Monte-Carlo Masters, Monte Carlo, Monaco	Clay	(France) Gaël Monfils	7–5, 5–7, 6–0
Winner	24 April 2016	Barcelona Open, Barcelona, Spain	Clay	(Japan) Kei Nishikori	6–4, 7–5

==== Doubles: 2 (2–0) ====
Category Grand Slam (0–0) Summer Olympic Games (1–0) ATP World Tour Finals (0–0) ATP World Tour Masters 1000 (0–0) ATP World Tour 500 (1–0) ATP World Tour 250 (0–0)	Titles by surface Hard (2–0) Clay (0–0) Grass (0–0)	Titles by conditions Outdoors (2–0) Indoors (0–0)

Outcome	Date	Tournament	Surface	Partner	Opponents in the final	Score in the final
Winner	12 August 2016	Summer Olympics, Rio de Janeiro, Brazil	Hard	(Spain) Marc López	(Romania) Florin Mergea (Romania) Horia Tecău	6–2, 3–6, 6–4
Winner	9 October 2016	China Open, Beijing, China	Hard	(Spain) Pablo Carreño Busta	(United States) Jack Sock (Australia) Bernard Tomic	6–7^{(6–8)}, 6–2, [10–8]

=== Earnings ===
- **Bold** font denotes tournament win

#	Venue	Singles Prize Money	Year-to-date
1.	2016 Qatar ExxonMobil Open	$105,940	$105,940
2.	2016 Australian Open	A$38,500	$132,347
3.	2016 Argentina Open	$26,570	$158,917
4.	2016 Rio Open	$70,735	$229,652
5.	2016 Indian Wells Masters	$251,500	$481,152
6.	2016 Miami Masters	$19,530	$500,682
7.	**2016 Monte-Carlo Rolex Masters**	**€717,315**	**$1,317,919**
8.	**2016 Barcelona Open Banc Sabadell**	**€460,000**	**$1,836,753**
9.	2016 Mutua Madrid Open	€225,300	$2,094,586
10.	2016 Internazionali BNL d'Italia	€90,010	$2,197,224
11.	2016 French Open	€102,000	$2,311,066
12.	2016 Western & Southern Open	$54,390	$2,365,456
13.	2016 US Open	$235,000	$2,600,456
14.	2016 China Open	$77,375	$2,677,831
15.	2016 Shanghai Masters	$35,845	$2,714,278

== See also ==
- 2016 ATP World Tour
- 2016 Novak Djokovic tennis season
- 2016 Roger Federer tennis season
- 2016 Andy Murray tennis season
- 2016 Stan Wawrinka tennis season
