= 2016 Qatar ExxonMobil Open – Doubles =

Doubles
- 2016 Qatar ExxonMobil Open

Final
- Champions: (Spain) Feliciano López (Spain) Marc López
- Runners-up: (Germany) Philipp Petzschner (Austria) Alexander Peya
- Score: 6–4, 6–3

Details
- Draw: 16
- Seeds: 4

Events
Singles	Doubles
- ATP Qatar Open

Juan Mónaco and Rafael Nadal were the defending champions, but Mónaco could not participate due to an injury. Nadal played alongside Fernando Verdasco, but lost in the first round to Teymuraz Gabashvili and Albert Ramos Viñolas.
Feliciano López and Marc López won the title, defeating Philipp Petzschner and Alexander Peya in the final, 6–4, 6–3.

== Seeds ==
1. (Netherlands) Jean-Julien Rojer / (Romania) Horia Tecău (semifinals)
2. (United Kingdom) Jamie Murray / (Brazil) Bruno Soares (semifinals)
3. (Spain) Feliciano López / (Spain) Marc López (champions)
4. (Germany) Philipp Petzschner / (Austria) Alexander Peya (final)

== Draw ==
Key

- Q = Qualifier
- WC = Wild card
- LL = Lucky loser
- Alt = Alternate
- ITF = ITF entry
- PR = Protected ranking
- SR = Special ranking
- SE = Special exempt
- JE = Junior exempt
- JR = Junior Accelerator Programme entrant
- CO = College Accelerator Programme entrant
- NG = Next Gen Accelerator Program entrant
- w/o = Walkover
- r = Retired
- d = Defaulted

=== Draw ===
First round
1	(Netherlands) J-J Rojer (Romania) H Tecău	7^{7}	6
(Israel) J Erlich (United Kingdom) C Fleming	6^{4}	3
(Spain) R Nadal (Spain) F Verdasco	7^{7}	4	[9]
(Russia) T Gabashvili (Spain) A Ramos Viñolas	6^{4}	6	[11]
4	(Germany) P Petzschner (Austria) A Peya	6	6
WC	(Qatar) MS Zayed (Qatar) MS Zayid	1	1
(Spain) D Marrero (Italy) A Seppi	7^{7}	6
(Spain) P Andújar (Argentina) L Mayer	6^{4}	3
(Italy) S Bolelli (Ukraine) S Stakhovsky	7^{8}	6
(Austria) J Knowle (Brazil) A Sá	6^{6}	1
(Netherlands) W Koolhof (Netherlands) M Middelkoop	6^{5}	4
3	(Spain) F López (Spain) M López	7^{7}	6
(France) J Chardy (France) P-H Mathieu	6	6
WC	(Qatar) JM Ali Mutawa (Tunisia) M Jaziri	2	2
(Moldova) R Albot (Slovakia) M Kližan	3	3
2	(United Kingdom) J Murray (Brazil) B Soares	6	6

Quarterfinals
1	(Netherlands) J-J Rojer (Romania) H Tecău	6	6
(Russia) T Gabashvili (Spain) A Ramos Viñolas	1	1
4	(Germany) P Petzschner (Austria) A Peya	6	6
(Spain) D Marrero (Italy) A Seppi	2	4
(Italy) S Bolelli (Ukraine) S Stakhovsky	2	7^{7}	[6]
3	(Spain) F López (Spain) M López	6	6^{3}	[10]
(France) J Chardy (France) P-H Mathieu	6^{5}	4
2	(United Kingdom) J Murray (Brazil) B Soares	7^{7}	6

Semifinals
1	(Netherlands) J-J Rojer (Romania) H Tecău	6^{5}	2
4	(Germany) P Petzschner (Austria) A Peya	7^{7}	6
3	(Spain) F López (Spain) M López	3	6	[10]
2	(United Kingdom) J Murray (Brazil) B Soares	6	3	[5]

Final
4	(Germany) P Petzschner (Austria) A Peya	4	3
3	(Spain) F López (Spain) M López	6	6
