= 2016 Mutua Madrid Open – Men's singles =

Men's singles
- 2016 Mutua Madrid Open

Final
- Champion: (Serbia) Novak Djokovic
- Runner-up: (United Kingdom) Andy Murray
- Score: 6–2, 3–6, 6–3

Events
Singles	men	women
Doubles	men	women
- Mutua Madrid Open

Novak Djokovic defeated defending champion Andy Murray in the final, 6–2, 3–6, 6–3, to win the men's singles tennis title at the 2016 Madrid Open. It was his second Madrid title and record 29th ATP Masters 1000 title overall.

== Seeds ==
The top eight seeds receive a bye into the second round.

1. (Serbia) Novak Djokovic (champion)
2. (United Kingdom) Andy Murray (final)
3. (Switzerland) ~~Roger Federer~~ (withdrew due to back injury)
4. (Switzerland) Stan Wawrinka (second round)
5. (Spain) Rafael Nadal (semifinals)
6. (Japan) Kei Nishikori (semifinals)
7. (France) Jo-Wilfried Tsonga (third round)
8. (Czech Republic) Tomáš Berdych (quarterfinals)

9. (Spain) David Ferrer (third round)
10. (France) Richard Gasquet (third round)
11. (Canada) Milos Raonic (quarterfinals)
12. (Belgium) David Goffin (first round)
13. (France) Gaël Monfils (second round)
14. (Austria) Dominic Thiem (first round)
15. (Spain) Roberto Bautista Agut (third round)
16. (France) Gilles Simon (third round)

Click on the seed number of a player to go to their draw section.

== Draw ==
Key

- Q = Qualifier
- WC = Wild card
- LL = Lucky loser
- Alt = Alternate
- ITF = ITF entry
- PR = Protected ranking
- SR = Special ranking
- SE = Special exempt
- JE = Junior exempt
- JR = Junior Accelerator Programme entrant
- CO = College Accelerator Programme entrant
- NG = Next Gen Accelerator Program entrant
- w/o = Walkover
- r = Retired
- d = Defaulted

=== Finals ===
Quarterfinals
1	(Serbia) Novak Djokovic	6	6
11	(Canada) Milos Raonic	3	4
(Australia) Nick Kyrgios	7^{8}	6^{1}	3
6	(Japan) Kei Nishikori	6^{6}	7^{7}	6
5	(Spain) Rafael Nadal	6	4	6
(Portugal) João Sousa	0	6	3
8	(Czech Republic) Tomáš Berdych	3	2
2	(United Kingdom) Andy Murray	6	6

Semifinals
1	(Serbia) Novak Djokovic	6	7^{7}
6	(Japan) Kei Nishikori	3	6^{4}
5	(Spain) Rafael Nadal	5	4
2	(United Kingdom) Andy Murray	7	6

Final
1	(Serbia) Novak Djokovic	6	3	6
2	(United Kingdom) Andy Murray	2	6	3

=== Top half ===
==== Section 1 ====
First round
WC	(Spain) N Almagro	2	2
(Croatia) B Ćorić	6	6
(Argentina) L Mayer	6^{5}	6	4
(Spain) F López	7^{7}	4	6
Q	(Colombia) S Giraldo	3	5
15	(Spain) R Bautista Agut	6	7
11	(Canada) M Raonic	7^{7}	6
(Brazil) T Bellucci	6^{4}	1
(Ukraine) A Dolgopolov	3	6	7^{7}
(United States) S Johnson	6	3	6^{4}
(Spain) A Ramos Viñolas	6	6
(France) J Chardy	3	4

Second round
1	(Serbia) N Djokovic	6	6
(Croatia) B Ćorić	2	4
(Spain) F López	3	7	5
15	(Spain) R Bautista Agut	6	5	7
11	(Canada) M Raonic	6	6^{3}	6
(Ukraine) A Dolgopolov	4	7^{7}	2
(Spain) A Ramos Viñolas	6^{6}	7	4
7	(France) J-W Tsonga	7^{8}	5	6

Third round
1	(Serbia) N Djokovic	6	6
15	(Spain) R Bautista Agut	2	1
11	(Canada) M Raonic	6	6
7	(France) J-W Tsonga	4	4

Quarterfinals
1	(Serbia) N Djokovic	6	6
11	(Canada) M Raonic	3	4

==== Section 2 ====
First round
(Argentina) G Pella	6^{7}	4
(Australia) N Kyrgios	7^{9}	6
(Uruguay) P Cuevas	6	3	7^{7}
(Germany) P Kohlschreiber	3	6	6^{5}
(South Africa) K Anderson	4	1
13	(France) G Monfils	6	6
10	(France) R Gasquet	6	7^{7}
Q	(Spain) R Carballés Baena	1	6^{5}
WC	(Argentina) J Mónaco	5	6^{3}
WC	(Spain) F Verdasco	7	7^{7}
(Italy) F Fognini	6	6
(Australia) B Tomic	2	4

Second round
4	(Switzerland) S Wawrinka	6^{7}	6^{2}
(Australia) N Kyrgios	7^{9}	7^{7}
(Uruguay) P Cuevas	6^{5}	6	7^{7}
13	(France) G Monfils	7^{7}	3	6^{4}
10	(France) R Gasquet	6	3	6
WC	(Spain) F Verdasco	4	6	1
(Italy) F Fognini	2	6	5
6	(Japan) K Nishikori	6	3	7

Third round
(Australia) N Kyrgios	7^{7}	4	6
(Uruguay) P Cuevas	6^{5}	6	3
10	(France) R Gasquet	4	5
6	(Japan) K Nishikori	6	7

Quarterfinals
(Australia) N Kyrgios	7^{8}	6^{1}	3
6	(Japan) K Nishikori	6^{6}	7^{7}	6

=== Bottom half ===
==== Section 3 ====
First round
(Serbia) V Troicki	4	4
(Russia) A Kuznetsov	6	6
Q	(France) P-H Herbert	7^{7}	6^{5}	4
(United States) S Querrey	6^{5}	7^{7}	6
Q	(France) L Pouille	7^{7}	2	7^{9}
12	(Belgium) D Goffin	6^{4}	6	6^{7}
14	(Austria) D Thiem	6^{5}	3
PR	(Argentina) JM del Potro	7^{7}	6
(United States) J Sock	2	6	7^{7}
(France) B Paire	6	2	6^{5}
(France) N Mahut	4	4
(Portugal) J Sousa	6	6

Second round
5	(Spain) R Nadal	6	6
(Russia) A Kuznetsov	3	3
(United States) S Querrey	6^{5}	6	6
Q	(France) L Pouille	7^{7}	3	4
PR	(Argentina) JM del Potro	4	6^{2}
(United States) J Sock	6	7^{7}
(Portugal) J Sousa	6	6
LL	(Spain) M Granollers	3	3

Third round
5	(Spain) R Nadal	6	6
(United States) S Querrey	4	2
(United States) J Sock	1	7^{7}	2
(Portugal) J Sousa	6	6^{3}	6

Quarterfinals
5	(Spain) R Nadal	6	4	6
(Portugal) J Sousa	0	6	3

==== Section 4 ====
First round
Q	(Uzbekistan) D Istomin	6	6
(Russia) T Gabashvili	1	4
Q	(United States) D Kudla	6^{7}	7^{7}	7^{7}
(Croatia) I Karlović	7^{9}	6^{5}	6^{4}
(Spain) G García López	6	1	2
9	(Spain) D Ferrer	3	6	6
16	(France) G Simon	6	3	6
(Cyprus) M Baghdatis	3	6	4
WC	(Spain) P Carreño Busta	7^{7}	6
(Bulgaria) G Dimitrov	6^{3}	3
Q	(Czech Republic) R Štěpánek	6	6^{4}	6
(Canada) V Pospisil	1	7^{7}	4

Second round
8	(Czech Republic) T Berdych	6	6
Q	(Uzbekistan) D Istomin	3	3
Q	(United States) D Kudla	4	6	4
9	(Spain) D Ferrer	6	4	6
16	(France) G Simon	2	6	6
WC	(Spain) P Carreño Busta	6	3	4
Q	(Czech Republic) R Štěpánek	6^{3}	6	1
2	(United Kingdom) A Murray	7^{7}	3	6

Third round
8	(Czech Republic) T Berdych	7^{10}	7
9	(Spain) D Ferrer	6^{8}	5
16	(France) G Simon	4	2
2	(United Kingdom) A Murray	6	6

Quarterfinals
8	(Czech Republic) T Berdych	3	2
2	(United Kingdom) A Murray	6	6

== Qualifying ==
=== Seeds ===
1. (Spain) Marcel Granollers (qualifying competition, lucky loser)
2. (France) Lucas Pouille (qualified)
3. (Spain) Íñigo Cervantes (first round)
4. (France) Paul-Henri Mathieu (withdrew)
5. (United States) Denis Kudla (qualified)
6. (Netherlands) Robin Haase (qualifying competition)
7. (Serbia) Dušan Lajović (qualifying competition)
8. (United States) Taylor Fritz (first round)
9. (Uzbekistan) Denis Istomin (qualified)
10. (United States) Rajeev Ram (first round)
11. (Croatia) Ivan Dodig (first round)
12. (Russia) Mikhail Youzhny (qualifying competition)
13. (France) Adrian Mannarino (first round)
14. (Dominican Republic) Víctor Estrella Burgos (first round)

=== Qualifiers ===
1. (Czech Republic) Radek Štěpánek
2. (France) Lucas Pouille
3. (Uzbekistan) Denis Istomin
4. (France) Pierre-Hugues Herbert
5. (United States) Denis Kudla
6. (Spain) Roberto Carballés Baena
7. (Colombia) Santiago Giraldo

=== Lucky loser ===
1. (Spain) Marcel Granollers

=== Draw ===
==== First qualifier ====
First round
1	(Spain) Marcel Granollers	7^{7}	6
WC	(Spain) Roberto Ortega Olmedo	6^{5}	2
(Czech Republic) Radek Štěpánek	3	6	6
8	(United States) Taylor Fritz	6	3	4

Qualifying competition
1	(Spain) Marcel Granollers	4	4
(Czech Republic) Radek Štěpánek	6	6

==== Second qualifier ====
First round
2	(France) Lucas Pouille	7^{7}	7^{7}
(Latvia) Ernests Gulbis	6^{2}	6^{4}
(Spain) Adrián Menéndez Maceiras	6	3	6
13	(France) Adrian Mannarino	3	6	2

Qualifying competition
2	(France) Lucas Pouille	6	6^{5}	6
(Spain) Adrián Menéndez Maceiras	3	7^{7}	1

==== Third qualifier ====
First round
3	(Spain) Íñigo Cervantes	3	7^{7}	5
(Kazakhstan) Mikhail Kukushkin	6	6^{3}	7
(Spain) Albert Montañés	4	3
9	(Uzbekistan) Denis Istomin	6	6

Qualifying competition
(Kazakhstan) Mikhail Kukushkin	2	6	3
9	(Uzbekistan) Denis Istomin	6	2	6

==== Fourth qualifier ====
First round
Alt	(Spain) Georgi Rumenov Payakov	0	3
(France) Pierre-Hugues Herbert	6	6
WC	(Japan) Akira Santillan	3	6^{7}
12	(Russia) Mikhail Youzhny	6	7^{9}

Qualifying competition
(France) Pierre-Hugues Herbert	7	6
12	(Russia) Mikhail Youzhny	5	1

==== Fifth qualifier ====
First round
5	(United States) Denis Kudla	6	6
PR	(Germany) Matthias Bachinger	4	3
(Germany) Benjamin Becker	4	6	6
11	(Croatia) Ivan Dodig	6	0	3

Qualifying competition
5	(United States) Denis Kudla	2	7^{7}	6
(Germany) Benjamin Becker	6	6^{5}	2

==== Sixth qualifier ====
First round
6	(Netherlands) Robin Haase	6	6
WC	(Spain) Álvaro López San Martín	3	4
(Spain) Roberto Carballés Baena	5	7^{7}	6
14	(Dominican Republic) Víctor Estrella Burgos	7	6^{1}	1

Qualifying competition
6	(Netherlands) Robin Haase	6^{3}	3
(Spain) Roberto Carballés Baena	7^{7}	6

==== Seventh qualifier ====
First round
7	(Serbia) Dušan Lajović	7	6
WC	(Spain) Jaume Munar	5	2
(Colombia) Santiago Giraldo	7	6
10	(United States) Rajeev Ram	5	4

Qualifying competition
7	(Serbia) Dušan Lajović	4	3
(Colombia) Santiago Giraldo	6	6
