= 2016 Qatar ExxonMobil Open – Singles =

Singles
- 2016 Qatar ExxonMobil Open

Final
- Champion: (Serbia) Novak Djokovic
- Runner-up: (Spain) Rafael Nadal
- Score: 6–1, 6–2

Details
- Draw: 32 (4 Q / 3 WC )
- Seeds: 8

Events
Singles	Doubles
- ATP Qatar Open

Novak Djokovic defeated Rafael Nadal 6–1, 6–2 in the final to win the singles tennis title at the 2016 ATP Qatar Open.

David Ferrer was the defending champion, but lost in the first round to Illya Marchenko.

== Seeds ==
1. (Serbia) Novak Djokovic (champion)
2. (Spain) Rafael Nadal (final)
3. (Czech Republic) Tomáš Berdych (semifinals)
4. (Spain) David Ferrer (first round)
5. (Spain) Feliciano López (first round)
6. (Italy) Andreas Seppi (first round)
7. (France) Jérémy Chardy (quarterfinals)
8. (Argentina) Leonardo Mayer (quarterfinals)

== Draw ==
=== Finals ===
Semifinals
1	(Serbia) Novak Djokovic	6	7^{7}
3	(Czech Republic) Tomáš Berdych	3	6^{3}
(Ukraine) Illya Marchenko	3	4
2	(Spain) Rafael Nadal	6	6

Final
1	(Serbia) Novak Djokovic	6	6
2	(Spain) Rafael Nadal	1	2

=== Top half ===
First round
1	(Serbia) N Djokovic	6	6
Q	(Germany) D Brown	2	2
(Spain) F Verdasco	7^{7}	7^{7}
WC	(Tunisia) M Jaziri	6^{4}	6^{4}
(Spain) P Andújar	6	0	6
(Italy) P Lorenzi	4	6	4
Q	(Germany) B Becker	1	2
8	(Argentina) L Mayer	6	6
3	(Czech Republic) T Berdych	7	6
(Ukraine) S Stakhovsky	5	4
(Italy) M Cecchinato	4	2
(Bosnia and Herzegovina) D Džumhur	6	6
Q	(United Kingdom) K Edmund	6	6
(Slovakia) M Kližan	2	3
(Spain) D Muñoz de la Nava	3	7^{7}	7
5	(Spain) F López	6	6^{4}	5

Second round
1	(Serbia) N Djokovic	6	6
(Spain) F Verdasco	2	2
(Spain) P Andújar	2	4
8	(Argentina) L Mayer	6	6
3	(Czech Republic) T Berdych	6	6
(Bosnia and Herzegovina) D Džumhur	0	4
Q	(United Kingdom) K Edmund	5	6	7^{7}
(Spain) D Muñoz de la Nava	7	3	6^{3}

Quarterfinals
1	(Serbia) N Djokovic	6	7
8	(Argentina) L Mayer	3	5
3	(Czech Republic) T Berdych	6	6
Q	(United Kingdom) K Edmund	3	2

Semifinals
1	(Serbia) N Djokovic	6	7^{7}
3	(Czech Republic) T Berdych	3	6^{3}

=== Bottom half ===
First round
7	(France) J Chardy	6	6
WC	(Qatar) MS Zayid	1	1
(Spain) A Ramos-Viñolas	3	6	6^{7}
(France) P-H Mathieu	6	4	7^{9}
(Russia) T Gabashvili	4	6	6
(Italy) S Bolelli	6	4	1
(Ukraine) I Marchenko	6^{8}	6	6
4	(Spain) D Ferrer	7^{10}	3	2
6	(Italy) A Seppi	6	1	4
(Lithuania) R Berankis	3	6	6
WC	(Turkey) M İlhan	2	4
(Russia) A Kuznetsov	6	6
(Netherlands) R Haase	5	6	7
Q	(Russia) A Karatsev	7	1	5
(Spain) P Carreño Busta	7^{7}	3	1
2	(Spain) R Nadal	6^{5}	6	6

Second round
7	(France) J Chardy	6	6
(France) P-H Mathieu	2	4
(Russia) T Gabashvili	4	2
(Ukraine) I Marchenko	6	6
(Lithuania) R Berankis	6^{6}	1
(Russia) A Kuznetsov	7^{8}	6
(Netherlands) R Haase	3	2
2	(Spain) R Nadal	6	6

Quarterfinals
7	(France) J Chardy	3	6^{3}
(Ukraine) I Marchenko	6	7^{7}
(Russia) A Kuznetsov	3	7	4
2	(Spain) R Nadal	6	5	6

Semifinals
(Ukraine) I Marchenko	3	4
2	(Spain) R Nadal	6	6

== Qualifying ==
=== Seeds ===
1. (Spain) Iñigo Cervantes (first round)
2. (Germany) Benjamin Becker (qualified)
3. (United Kingdom) Kyle Edmund (qualified)
4. (Belgium) Ruben Bemelmans (first round)
5. (Slovakia) Lukáš Lacko (qualifying competition)
6. (Germany) Michael Berrer (qualifying competition)
7. (Germany) Dustin Brown (qualified)
8. (Moldova) Radu Albot (qualifying competition)

=== Qualifiers ===
1. (Germany) Dustin Brown
2. (Germany) Benjamin Becker
3. (United Kingdom) Kyle Edmund
4. (Russia) Aslan Karatsev

=== Qualifying draw ===
==== First qualifier ====
First round
1	(Spain) Iñigo Cervantes	6	2	5
(Bosnia and Herzegovina) Mirza Bašić	3	6	7
(Czech Republic) Marek Michalička	6^{5}	4
7	(Germany) Dustin Brown	7^{7}	6

Qualifying competition
(Bosnia and Herzegovina) Mirza Bašić	4	5
7	(Germany) Dustin Brown	6	7

==== Second qualifier ====
First round
2	(Germany) Benjamin Becker	3	6	6
(Italy) Flavio Cipolla	6	3	1
WC	(Qatar) Jabor Mohammed Ali Mutawa	0	1
6	(Germany) Michael Berrer	6	6

Qualifying competition
2	(Germany) Benjamin Becker	5	7	7
6	(Germany) Michael Berrer	7	5	5

==== Third qualifier ====
First round
3	(United Kingdom) Kyle Edmund	6	6
(Italy) Andrea Arnaboldi	4	3
WC	(Qatar) Mousa Shanan Zayed	2	1
8	(Moldova) Radu Albot	6	6

Qualifying competition
3	(United Kingdom) Kyle Edmund	6	6
8	(Moldova) Radu Albot	2	4

==== Fourth qualifier ====
First round
4	(Belgium) Ruben Bemelmans	3	3
(Russia) Aslan Karatsev	6	6
(Czech Republic) Jan Hernych	1	4
5	(Slovakia) Lukáš Lacko	6	6

Qualifying competition
(Russia) Aslan Karatsev	6	6
5	(Slovakia) Lukáš Lacko	4	4
