= 2016 Qatar ExxonMobil Open =

- Date: 4–9 January
- Edition: 24th
- Category: ATP World Tour 250 series
- Draw: 32S / 16D
- Surface: Hard / outdoor
- Location: Doha, Qatar
- Venue: Khalifa International Tennis and Squash Complex

Champions

Singles
- (Serbia) Novak Djokovic

Doubles
- (Spain) Feliciano López / (Spain) Marc López
← 2015 ·	ATP Qatar Open	· 2017 →

The 2016 Qatar Open (also known as 2016 Qatar ExxonMobil Open for sponsorship reasons) was a men's tennis tournament played on outdoor hard courts. It was the 24th edition of the Qatar Open, and part of the ATP World Tour 250 series of the 2016 ATP World Tour. It took place at the Khalifa International Tennis and Squash Complex in Doha, Qatar, from 4 January until 9 January 2016. First-seeded Novak Djokovic won the singles title.

== Finals ==
=== Singles ===
(Serbia) Novak Djokovic defeated (Spain) Rafael Nadal, 6–1, 6–2

- It was Djokovic's 1st singles title of the year and the 60th of his career.

=== Doubles ===
(Spain) Feliciano López / (Spain) Marc López defeated (Germany) Philipp Petzschner / (Austria) Alexander Peya, 6–4, 6–3

== Points and prize money ==
=== Point distribution ===
Event	W	F	SF	QF	Round of 16	Round of 32	Q	Q2	Q1
Singles	250	150	90	45	20	0	12	6	0
Doubles	250	150	90	45	0	—	—	—	—

=== Prize money ===
Event	W	F	SF	QF	Round of 16	Round of 32	Q2	Q1
Singles	$201,165	$105,940	$57,380	$32,700	$19,265	$11,415	$5,355	$2,675
Doubles	$64,420	$33,860	$18,350	$10,500	$6,150	—	—	—
Doubles prize money per team

== Singles main-draw entrants ==
=== Seeds ===
Country	Player	Rank^{1}	Seed
SRB	Novak Djokovic	1	1
ESP	Rafael Nadal	5	2
CZE	Tomáš Berdych	6	3
ESP	David Ferrer	7	4
ESP	Feliciano López	17	5
ITA	Andreas Seppi	29	6
FRA	Jérémy Chardy	31	7
ARG	Leonardo Mayer	35	8

- ^{1} Rankings as of December 28, 2015

=== Other entrants ===
The following players received wildcards into the singles main draw:

- (Turkey) Marsel İlhan
- (Tunisia) Malek Jaziri
- (Qatar) Mubarak Shannan Zayid

The following players received entry from the qualifying draw:

- (Germany) Benjamin Becker
- (Germany) Dustin Brown
- (United Kingdom) Kyle Edmund
- (Russia) Aslan Karatsev

=== Withdrawals ===
Before the tournament

- (Belgium) Steve Darcis → replaced by (Italy) Marco Cecchinato
- (France) Richard Gasquet (back injury) → replaced by (France) Paul-Henri Mathieu
- (Argentina) Guido Pella → replaced by (Ukraine) Illya Marchenko

== Doubles main-draw entrants ==
=== Seeds ===
Country	Player	Country	Player	Rank^{1}	Seed
NED	Jean-Julien Rojer	ROU	Horia Tecău	5	1
GBR	Jamie Murray	BRA	Bruno Soares	29	2
ESP	Feliciano López	ESP	Marc López	67	3
GER	Philipp Petzschner	AUT	Alexander Peya	74	4

- ^{1} Rankings as of December 28, 2015

=== Other entrants ===
The following pairs received wildcards into the doubles main draw:

- (Qatar) Jabor Mohammed Ali Mutawa / (Tunisia) Malek Jaziri
- (Qatar) Mousa Shanan Zayed / (Qatar) Mubarak Shannan Zayid
