= 2016 Mutua Madrid Open =

- Date: 30 April – 8 May
- Edition: 15th (ATP); 8th (WTA)
- Draw: 56S / 24D; 64S / 28D
- Prize money: €9,542,720
- Surface: Clay
- Location: Madrid, Spain
- Venue: Park Manzanares

Champions

Men's singles
- (Serbia) Novak Djokovic

Women's singles
- (Romania) Simona Halep

Men's doubles
- (Netherlands) Jean-Julien Rojer / (Romania) Horia Tecău

Women's doubles
- (France) Caroline Garcia / (France) Kristina Mladenovic
| ← 2015 · | Madrid Open | · 2017 → |

The 2016 Mutua Madrid Open was a professional tennis tournament played on outdoor clay courts at the Park Manzanares in Madrid, Spain from 30 April to 8 May 2016. It was the 15th edition of the event on the ATP World Tour and 8th on the WTA Tour. It was classified as an ATP World Tour Masters 1000 event on the 2016 ATP World Tour and a Premier Mandatory event on the 2016 WTA Tour.

On 1 May, tournament organizers staged a successful Guinness World Record. 1,474 people—including spectators, players, and tournament officials—bounced tennis balls on racquets simultaneously for ten seconds. This broke the previous record of 767 people set at the 2015 China Open.

Ion Țiriac the former Romanian ATP player and now billionaire businessman is the current owner of the tournament.

== Points and prize money ==
=== Point distribution ===
| Event | W | F | SF | QF | Round of 16 | Round of 32 | Round of 64 | Q | Q2 | Q1 |
| Men's singles | 1000 | 600 | 360 | 180 | 90 | 45 | 10 | 25 | 16 | 0 |
| Men's doubles | 1000 | 600 | 360 | 180 | 90 | 0 | — | — | — | — |
| Women's singles | 1000 | 650 | 390 | 215 | 120 | 65 | 10 | 30 | 20 | 2 |
| Women's doubles | 1000 | 650 | 390 | 215 | 120 | 10 | — | — | — | — |

=== Prize money ===
| Event | W | F | SF | QF | Round of 16 | Round of 32 | Round of 64 | Q2 | Q1 |
| Men's singles | €912,900 | €447,630 | €225,300 | €114,560 | €59,490 | €31,365 | €16,935 | €3,900 | €1,990 |
| Women's singles | €912,900 | €447,630 | €225,300 | €114,560 | €59,490 | €28,220 | €13,250 | €3,644 | €1,770 |
| Men's doubles | €282,720 | €138,400 | €69,430 | €35,630 | €18,420 | €9,720 | — | — | — |
| Women's doubles | €282,720 | €138,400 | €69,433 | €35,630 | €18,025 | €9,280 | — | — | — |

== ATP singles main-draw entrants ==
=== Seeds ===
| Country | Player | Rank^{1} | Seed |
|---|---|---|---|
| SRB | Novak Djokovic | 1 | 1 |
| GBR | Andy Murray | 2 | 2 |
| ~~SUI~~ | ~~Roger Federer~~ | ~~3~~ | ~~3~~ |
| SUI | Stan Wawrinka | 4 | 4 |
| ESP | Rafael Nadal | 5 | 5 |
| JPN | Kei Nishikori | 6 | 6 |
| FRA | Jo-Wilfried Tsonga | 7 | 7 |
| CZE | Tomáš Berdych | 8 | 8 |
| ESP | David Ferrer | 9 | 9 |
| FRA | Richard Gasquet | 10 | 10 |
| CAN | Milos Raonic | 11 | 11 |
| BEL | David Goffin | 13 | 12 |
| FRA | Gaël Monfils | 14 | 13 |
| AUT | Dominic Thiem | 15 | 14 |
| ESP | Roberto Bautista Agut | 17 | 15 |
| FRA | Gilles Simon | 18 | 16 |

- Rankings are as of 25 April 2016.

=== Other entrants ===
The following players received wildcards into the main draw:

- (Spain) Nicolás Almagro
- (Spain) Pablo Carreño Busta
- (Argentina) Juan Mónaco
- (Spain) Fernando Verdasco

The following player received entry using a protected ranking into the main draw:

- (Argentina) Juan Martín del Potro

The following players received entry from the qualifying draw:

- (Spain) Roberto Carballés Baena
- (Colombia) Santiago Giraldo
- (France) Pierre-Hugues Herbert
- (Uzbekistan) Denis Istomin
- (United States) Denis Kudla
- (France) Lucas Pouille
- (Czech Republic) Radek Štěpánek

The following player received entry as a lucky loser:

- (Spain) Marcel Granollers

=== Withdrawals ===
Before the tournament

- (Croatia) Marin Čilić → replaced by (Canada) Vasek Pospisil
- (Germany) Tommy Haas → replaced by (Croatia) Borna Ćorić
- (United States) John Isner → replaced by (Russia) Teymuraz Gabashvili
- (Slovakia) Martin Kližan → replaced by (Spain) Albert Ramos Viñolas
- (Italy) Andreas Seppi → replaced by (Russia) Andrey Kuznetsov
- (Switzerland) Roger Federer (late withdrawal) → replaced by (Spain) Marcel Granollers

== ATP doubles main-draw entrants ==
=== Seeds ===
| Country | Player | Country | Player | Rank^{1} | Seed |
|---|---|---|---|---|---|
| FRA | Pierre-Hugues Herbert | FRA | Nicolas Mahut | 7 | 1 |
| GBR | Jamie Murray | BRA | Bruno Soares | 10 | 2 |
| NED | Jean-Julien Rojer | ROU | Horia Tecău | 11 | 3 |
| CRO | Ivan Dodig | BRA | Marcelo Melo | 12 | 4 |
| USA | Bob Bryan | USA | Mike Bryan | 15 | 5 |
| IND | Rohan Bopanna | ROU | Florin Mergea | 24 | 6 |
| AUT | Alexander Peya | SRB | Nenad Zimonjić | 38 | 7 |
| CAN | Vasek Pospisil | USA | Jack Sock | 42 | 8 |

- Rankings are as of 25 April 2016.

=== Other entrants ===
The following pairs received wildcards into the doubles main draw:

- (India) Mahesh Bhupathi / (France) Fabrice Martin
- (Spain) Pablo Carreño Busta / (Spain) Fernando Verdasco

== WTA singles main-draw entrants ==
=== Seeds ===
| Country | Player | Rank^{1} | Seed |
|---|---|---|---|
| POL | Agnieszka Radwańska | 2 | 1 |
| GER | Angelique Kerber | 3 | 2 |
| ESP | Garbiñe Muguruza | 4 | 3 |
| BLR | Victoria Azarenka | 5 | 4 |
| CZE | Petra Kvitová | 6 | 5 |
| ROU | Simona Halep | 7 | 6 |
| ITA | Roberta Vinci | 8 | 7 |
| ESP | Carla Suárez Navarro | 11 | 8 |
| RUS | Svetlana Kuznetsova | 13 | 9 |
| SUI | Timea Bacsinszky | 15 | 10 |
| CZE | Lucie Šafářová | 16 | 11 |
| UKR | Elina Svitolina | 17 | 12 |
| CZE | Karolína Plíšková | 18 | 13 |
| SRB | Ana Ivanovic | 19 | 14 |
| ITA | Sara Errani | 20 | 15 |
| USA | Sloane Stephens | 21 | 16 |

- Rankings are as of 25 April 2016.

=== Other entrants ===
The following players received wildcards into the main draw:

- (Spain) Lara Arruabarrena
- (Spain) Paula Badosa Gibert
- (Romania) Sorana Cîrstea
- (Spain) Lourdes Domínguez Lino
- (Spain) Sara Sorribes Tormo

The following players received entry using a protected ranking into the main draw:

- (Italy) Karin Knapp
- (United Kingdom) Laura Robson

The following players received entry from the qualifying draw:

- (United States) Louisa Chirico
- (Croatia) Mirjana Lučić-Baroni
- (Puerto Rico) Monica Puig
- (United States) Alison Riske
- (Germany) Laura Siegemund
- (Czech Republic) Kateřina Siniaková
- (Romania) Patricia Maria Țig
- (Russia) Elena Vesnina

The following player received entry as a lucky loser:

- (United Kingdom) Heather Watson

=== Withdrawals ===
Before the tournament

- (Switzerland) Belinda Bencic (lower back injury) → replaced by (United Kingdom) Heather Watson
- (Italy) Flavia Pennetta (retirement from tennis) → replaced by (Montenegro) Danka Kovinić
- (Russia) Maria Sharapova (provisional suspension) → replaced by (Germany) Anna-Lena Friedsam
- (United States) Serena Williams (flu) → replaced by (United Kingdom) Laura Robson
- (United States) Venus Williams (hamstring injury) → replaced by (United States) Christina McHale
- (Denmark) Caroline Wozniacki (right ankle injury) → replaced by (Slovakia) Dominika Cibulková

During the tournament

- (Belarus) Victoria Azarenka (back injury)
- (Italy) Camila Giorgi (mid-back injury)
- (Czech Republic) Lucie Šafářová (gastrointestinal illness)

=== Retirements ===
- (Spain) Paula Badosa Gibert (cramping)
- (United Kingdom) Johanna Konta (upper respiratory illness)

== WTA doubles main-draw entrants ==
=== Seeds ===
| Country | Player | Country | Player | Rank^{1} | Seed |
|---|---|---|---|---|---|
| SUI | Martina Hingis | IND | Sania Mirza | 2 | 1 |
| ~~USA~~ | ~~Bethanie Mattek-Sands~~ | ~~CZE~~ | ~~Lucie Šafářová~~ | ~~8~~ | ~~2~~ |
| HUN | Tímea Babos | KAZ | Yaroslava Shvedova | 15 | 3 |
| TPE | Chan Hao-ching | TPE | Chan Yung-jan | 15 | 4 |
| FRA | Caroline Garcia | FRA | Kristina Mladenovic | 22 | 5 |
| CZE | Andrea Hlaváčková | CZE | Lucie Hradecká | 22 | 6 |
| ESP | Garbiñe Muguruza | ESP | Carla Suárez Navarro | 33 | 7 |
| RUS | Ekaterina Makarova | RUS | Elena Vesnina | 39 | 8 |

- Rankings are as of 25 April 2016.

=== Other entrants ===
The following pairs received wildcards into the doubles main draw:

- (Spain) Paula Badosa Gibert / (Spain) María José Martínez Sánchez
- (Russia) Svetlana Kuznetsova / (Russia) Anastasia Pavlyuchenkova
- (Czech Republic) Květa Peschke / (Czech Republic) Barbora Strýcová
- (Spain) Sílvia Soler Espinosa / (Spain) Sara Sorribes Tormo

The following pair received entry as alternates:

- (Romania) Raluca Olaru / (Poland) Alicja Rosolska

=== Withdrawals ===
Before the tournament

- (Czech Republic) Lucie Šafářová (gastrointestinal illness)

During the tournament

- (Russia) Anastasia Pavlyuchenkova (left adductor injury)
- (Spain) Carla Suárez Navarro (upper respiratory illness)

=== Retirements ===
- (Germany) Laura Siegemund (dizziness)

== Champions ==
=== Men's singles ===
- (Serbia) Novak Djokovic def. (United Kingdom) Andy Murray, 6–2, 3–6, 6–3

=== Women's singles ===
- (Romania) Simona Halep def. (Slovakia) Dominika Cibulková, 6–2, 6–4

=== Men's doubles ===
- (Netherlands) Jean-Julien Rojer / (Romania) Horia Tecău def. (India) Rohan Bopanna / (Romania) Florin Mergea, 6–4, 7–6^{(7–5)}

=== Women's doubles ===
- (France) Caroline Garcia / (France) Kristina Mladenovic def. (Switzerland) Martina Hingis / (India) Sania Mirza, 6–4, 6–4
