= 2022 Citi Open =

Sports tournament

- Date: August 1 – 7
- Edition: 53rd (men); 10th (women)
- Category: ATP 500 (men); WTA 250 (women)
- Draw: 48S/16D (men); 32S/16D (women)
- Prize money: $2,108,110 (men) $251,750 (women)
- Surface: Hard (outdoor); SportMaster Sport Surfaces
- Location: Washington, D.C., United States
- Venue: William H.G. FitzGerald Tennis Center

Champions

Men's singles
- (Australia) Nick Kyrgios

Women's singles
- Liudmila Samsonova

Men's doubles
- (Australia) Nick Kyrgios / (United States) Jack Sock

Women's doubles
- (United States) Jessica Pegula / (New Zealand) Erin Routliffe
← 2021 ·	Washington Open	· 2023 →

The 2022 Washington Open (called the Citi Open for sponsorship reasons) was a tennis tournament played on outdoor hard courts. It was the 53rd edition of the Washington Open for the men. It was the 10th edition of the tournament for the women and the first since 2019. The event was part of the ATP Tour 500 series of the 2022 ATP Tour, WTA 250 of the 2022 WTA Tour and part of the US Open Series leading up to the US Open grand slam in September. The Washington Open took place at the William H.G. FitzGerald Tennis Center in Washington, D.C., United States, from August 1 to August 7, 2022.

== Champions ==
=== Men's singles ===
- (Australia) Nick Kyrgios def. (Japan) Yoshihito Nishioka, 6–4, 6–3

=== Men's doubles ===
- (Australia) Nick Kyrgios / (United States) Jack Sock def. (Croatia) Ivan Dodig / (United States) Austin Krajicek, 7–5, 6–4

=== Women's singles ===
- Liudmila Samsonova def. (Estonia) Kaia Kanepi, 4–6, 6–3, 6–3

This was Samsonova's second WTA Tour title, and first of the year.

=== Women's doubles ===
- (United States) Jessica Pegula / (New Zealand) Erin Routliffe def. Anna Kalinskaya / (United States) Caty McNally, 6–3, 5–7, [12–10]

== Points and Prize Money ==
=== Point distribution ===
Event	W	F	SF	QF	Round of 16	Round of 32	Round of 64	Q	Q2	Q1
Men's singles	500	300	180	90	45	20	0	10	4	0
Men's doubles	500	300	180	90	0	—	—	45	25	0
Women's singles	280	180	110	60	30	1	—	18	12	1
Women's doubles	280	180	110	60	1	—	—	—	—	—

=== Prize money ===
Event	W	F	SF	QF	Round of 16	Round of 32	Round of 64	Q2	Q1
Men's singles	$342,800	$182,825	$94,840	$49,515	$26,095	$14,280	$7,620	$4,000	$2,285
Men's doubles*	$119,980	$63,990	$32,370	$16,190	$8,380	—	—	—	—
Women's singles	$33,200	$19,750	$11,000	$6,200	$4,100	$2,835	—	$2,360	$1,750
Women's doubles*	$12,000	$6,700	$3,950	$2,350	$1,800	—	—	—	—

_{*per team}

== ATP Singles main draw entrants ==
=== Seeds ===
Country	Player	Rank^{†}	Seed
	Andrey Rublev	8	1
POL	Hubert Hurkacz	11	2
USA	Taylor Fritz	12	3
USA	Reilly Opelka	17	4
BUL	Grigor Dimitrov	18	5
CAN	Denis Shapovalov	21	6
	Karen Khachanov	23	7
NED	Botic van de Zandschulp	26	8
DEN	Holger Rune	27	9
USA	Frances Tiafoe	29	10
AUS	Alex de Minaur	30	11
ARG	Sebastián Báez	32	12
USA	Maxime Cressy	34	13
USA	Tommy Paul	36	14
	Aslan Karatsev	37	15
GBR	Dan Evans	39	16

^{†} Rankings are as of July 25, 2022.

=== Other entrants ===
The following players received wildcard entry into the singles main draw :

- (United States) Christopher Eubanks
- (United States) Bradley Klahn
- (United States) Stefan Kozlov
- (United States) J. J. Wolf

The following player received entry with a protected ranking:

- (United Kingdom) Kyle Edmund

The following players received entry from the qualifying draw:

- (Japan) Taro Daniel
- (Croatia) Borna Gojo
- (Germany) Dominik Koepfer
- (United States) Michael Mmoh
- (Japan) Yosuke Watanuki
- (Chinese Taipei) Wu Tung-lin

=== Withdrawals ===
Before the tournament

- (Kazakhstan) Alexander Bublik → replaced by (Germany) Peter Gojowczyk
- (Argentina) Francisco Cerúndolo → replaced by (United Kingdom) Jack Draper

== ATP Doubles main draw entrants ==
=== Seeds ===
Country	Player	Country	Player	Rank^{†}	Seed
USA	Rajeev Ram	ARG	Horacio Zeballos	5	1
NED	Wesley Koolhof	GBR	Neal Skupski	11	2
ESA	Marcelo Arévalo	NED	Jean-Julien Rojer	16	3
CRO	Ivan Dodig	USA	Austin Krajicek	33	4

^{†} Rankings are as of July 25, 2022.

=== Other entrants ===
The following pairs received wildcard entry into the doubles main draw :

- (Australia) Alex de Minaur / (United States) Frances Tiafoe
- (United States) Denis Kudla / (Canada) Denis Shapovalov

The following pair received entry from the qualifying draw:

- (Finland) Emil Ruusuvuori / (Australia) Luke Saville

=== Withdrawals ===
Before the tournament

- (Spain) Marcel Granollers / (Argentina) Horacio Zeballos → replaced by (Australia) Nick Kyrgios / (United States) Jack Sock
- (Croatia) Nikola Mektić / (United States) Rajeev Ram → replaced by (United States) Rajeev Ram / (Argentina) Horacio Zeballos
- (Brazil) Rafael Matos / (Spain) David Vega Hernández → replaced by (United States) Mackenzie McDonald / (Netherlands) Botic van de Zandschulp

== WTA Singles main draw entrants ==
=== Seeds ===
Country	Player	Rank^{†}	Seed
USA	Jessica Pegula	7	1
GBR	Emma Raducanu	10	2
ROU	Simona Halep	16	3
	Victoria Azarenka	20	4
BEL	Elise Mertens	30	5
EST	Kaia Kanepi	36	6
EGY	Mayar Sherif	46	7
DEN	Clara Tauson	47	8

^{†} Rankings are as of July 25, 2022.

=== Other entrants ===
The following players received wildcard entry into the main draw :

- (United States) Hailey Baptiste
- (United States) Sofia Kenin
- (United States) Venus Williams

The following players received entry from the qualifying draw:

- (Sweden) Mirjam Björklund
- (Spain) Cristina Bucșa
- (United States) Louisa Chirico
- (Canada) Rebecca Marino

The following player received entry as a lucky loser:

- (China) Wang Xiyu

=== Withdrawals ===
Before the tournament

- (Czech Republic) Marie Bouzková → replaced by (China) Wang Xiyu
- (Canada) Leylah Fernandez → replaced by (United Kingdom) Harriet Dart
- (United States) Ann Li → replaced by (Belgium) Greet Minnen
- Anastasia Potapova → replaced by (Australia) Daria Saville

== WTA Doubles main draw entrants ==
=== Seeds ===
Country	Player	Country	Player	Rank^{†}	Seed
USA	Jessica Pegula	NZL	Erin Routliffe	45	1
BEL	Elise Mertens	BEL	Greet Minnen	53	2
CZE	Lucie Hradecká	ROU	Monica Niculescu	61	3
	Anna Kalinskaya	USA	Caty McNally	85	4

^{†} Rankings are as of July 25, 2022.

=== Other entrants ===
The following pairs received wildcard entry into the doubles main draw :

- (United States) Makenna Jones / (United States) Sloane Stephens
- (United States) Jamie Loeb / (United States) Christina McHale

=== Withdrawals ===
- (United States) Sophie Chang / (United States) Angela Kulikov → replaced by (United States) Sophie Chang / (Australia) Astra Sharma
- (Czech Republic) Lucie Hradecká / (India) Sania Mirza → replaced by (Czech Republic) Lucie Hradecká / (Romania) Monica Niculescu
- Anastasia Potapova / Yana Sizikova → replaced by (United States) Allura Zamarripa / (United States) Maribella Zamarripa
- (Poland) Alicja Rosolska / (New Zealand) Erin Routliffe → replaced by (United States) Jessica Pegula / (New Zealand) Erin Routliffe
