= 2022 National Bank Open – Women's singles =

Women's singles
- 2022 National Bank Open

Final
- Champion: (Romania) Simona Halep
- Runner-up: (Brazil) Beatriz Haddad Maia
- Score: 6–3, 2–6, 6–3

Details
- Draw: 56
- Seeds: 16

Events
| Singles | men | women |
| Doubles | men | women |
| ← 2021 · | Canadian Open | · 2023 → |

Simona Halep defeated Beatriz Haddad Maia in the final, 6–3, 2–6, 6–3 to win the women's singles tennis title at the 2022 Canadian Open. Halep's third Canadian Open title marked the first time in her career she won an event on three occasions and also earned her a ninth WTA 1000 title. This was the last WTA tournament Halep won and her last WTA tournament final. Haddad Maia was the first Brazilian to reach beyond the quarterfinals and contest the final at a WTA 1000 tournament.

Camila Giorgi was the defending champion, but lost in the third round to Jessica Pegula in a rematch of last year's semifinal.

This marked the final Canadian Open appearance for three-time champion and former world No. 1 Serena Williams, who lost in the second round to Belinda Bencic.

== Seeds ==
The top eight seeds received a bye into the second round.

1. (Poland) Iga Świątek (third round)
2. (Estonia) Anett Kontaveit (second round)
3. (Greece) Maria Sakkari (third round)
4. (Spain) Paula Badosa (second round, retired)
5. (Tunisia) Ons Jabeur (second round, retired)
6. Aryna Sabalenka (third round)
7. (United States) Jessica Pegula (semifinals)
8. (Spain) Garbiñe Muguruza (third round)

9. (United Kingdom) Emma Raducanu (first round)
10. (United States) Coco Gauff (quarterfinals)
11. Daria Kasatkina (first round)
12. (Switzerland) Belinda Bencic (quarterfinals)
13. (Canada) Leylah Fernandez (second round)
14. (Czech Republic) Karolína Plíšková (semifinals)
15. (Romania) Simona Halep (champion)
16. (Latvia) Jeļena Ostapenko (second round)

Click on the seed number of a player to go to their draw section.

== Draw ==
=== Key ===
- Q = Qualifier
- WC = Wild card
- LL = Lucky loser
- Alt = Alternate
- ITF = ITF entry
- PR = Protected ranking
- SR = Special ranking
- SE = Special exempt
- JE = Junior exempt
- JR = Junior Accelerator Programme entrant
- CO = College Accelerator Programme entrant
- NG = Next Gen Accelerator Program entrant
- w/o = Walkover
- r = Retired
- d = Defaulted

=== Finals ===
Quarterfinals
(Brazil) Beatriz Haddad Maia | 2 | 6 | 6
12 | (Switzerland) Belinda Bencic | 6 | 3 | 3
14 | (Czech Republic) Karolína Plíšková | 4 | 6 | 6
(China) Zheng Qinwen | 6 | 4 | 4
7 | (United States) Jessica Pegula | 6 | 6
(Kazakhstan) Yulia Putintseva | 3 | 3
10 | (United States) Coco Gauff | 4 | 6^{2}
15 | (Romania) Simona Halep | 6 | 7^{7}

Semifinals
(Brazil) Beatriz Haddad Maia | 6 | 7^{9}
14 | (Czech Republic) Karolína Plíšková | 4 | 6^{7}
7 | (United States) Jessica Pegula | 6 | 3 | 4
15 | (Romania) Simona Halep | 2 | 6 | 6

Final
(Brazil) Beatriz Haddad Maia | 3 | 6 | 3
15 | (Romania) Simona Halep | 6 | 2 | 6

=== Top half ===
==== Section 1 ====
First round
V Kudermetova | 4 | 6 | 6^{3}
Q | (Australia) A Tomljanović | 6 | 2 | 7^{7}
(Brazil) B Haddad Maia | 6 | 2 | 6
(Italy) M Trevisan | 2 | 6 | 2
Q | (Australia) S Sanders | 4 | 7^{7} | 3
13 | (Canada) L Fernandez | 6 | 6^{2} | 6
12 | (Switzerland) B Bencic | 6 | 6
Q | (Czech Republic) T Martincová | 4 | 2
LL | (Spain) N Párrizas Díaz | 3 | 4
PR | (United States) S Williams | 6 | 6
(Estonia) K Kanepi | 7^{7} | 3
(Japan) N Osaka | 6^{4} | 0^{r}

Second round
1 | (Poland) I Świątek | 6 | 6
Q | (Australia) A Tomljanović | 1 | 2
(Brazil) B Haddad Maia | 7^{7} | 6
13 | (Canada) L Fernandez | 6^{4} | 1
12 | (Switzerland) B Bencic | 6 | 6
PR | (United States) S Williams | 2 | 4
(Estonia) K Kanepi | 4 | 4
8 | (Spain) G Muguruza | 6 | 6

Third round
1 | (Poland) I Świątek | 4 | 6 | 5
(Brazil) B Haddad Maia | 6 | 3 | 7
12 | (Switzerland) B Bencic | 6 | 6
8 | (Spain) G Muguruza | 1 | 3

Quarterfinals
(Brazil) B Haddad Maia | 2 | 6 | 6
12 | (Switzerland) B Bencic | 6 | 3 | 3

==== Section 2 ====
First round
(United States) S Stephens | 6 | 6^{5} | 7
PR | (United States) S Kenin | 2 | 7^{7} | 5
(United States) A Anisimova | 6 | 6
WC | (Canada) C Zhao | 1 | 3
(Czech Republic) B Krejčíková | 3 | 4
14 | (Czech Republic) Ka Plíšková | 6 | 6
11 | D Kasatkina | 6^{5} | 4
(Canada) B Andreescu | 7^{7} | 6
(France) A Cornet | 3 | 6 | 6
(France) C Garcia | 6 | 3 | 3
WC | (Canada) R Marino | 6 | 6^{5} | 4
(China) Q Zheng | 3 | 7^{7} | 6

Second round
3 | (Greece) M Sakkari | 6 | 4 | 6
(United States) S Stephens | 2 | 6 | 2
(United States) A Anisimova | 1 | 1
14 | (Czech Republic) Ka Plíšková | 6 | 6
(Canada) B Andreescu | 6 | 4 | 6
(France) A Cornet | 3 | 6 | 3
(China) Q Zheng | 6 | 2
5 | (Tunisia) O Jabeur | 1 | 1^{r}

Third round
3 | (Greece) M Sakkari | 1 | 7^{11} | 3
14 | (Czech Republic) Ka Plíšková | 6 | 6^{9} | 6
(Canada) B Andreescu | 5 | 7 | 2
(China) Q Zheng | 7 | 5 | 6

Quarterfinals
14 | (Czech Republic) Ka Plíšková | 4 | 6 | 6
(China) Q Zheng | 6 | 4 | 4

=== Bottom half ===
==== Section 3 ====
First round
Q | (United States) A Muhammad | 7^{7} | 6
(United States) M Keys | 6^{5} | 4
(Hungary) A Bondár | 6^{2} | 1
(Belgium) E Mertens | 7^{7} | 6
(Italy) C Giorgi | 7^{7} | 6
9 | (United Kingdom) E Raducanu | 6^{0} | 2
16 | (Latvia) J Ostapenko | 6 | 6
(Ukraine) A Kalinina | 4 | 2
(Czech Republic) P Kvitová | 2 | 6 | 3
(United States) A Riske-Amritraj | 6 | 4 | 6
WC | (Canada) K Sebov | 6 | 2 | 5
(Kazakhstan) Y Putintseva | 3 | 6 | 7

Second round
7 | (United States) J Pegula | 6 | 7
Q | (United States) A Muhammad | 2 | 5
(Belgium) E Mertens | 3 | 5
(Italy) C Giorgi | 6 | 7
16 | (Latvia) J Ostapenko | 6^{2} | 6 | 5
(United States) A Riske-Amritraj | 7^{7} | 0 | 7
(Kazakhstan) Y Putintseva | 7 | 1
4 | (Spain) P Badosa | 5 | 0^{r}

Third round
7 | (United States) J Pegula | 3 | 6 | 7
(Italy) C Giorgi | 6 | 0 | 5
(United States) A Riske-Amritraj | 3 | 5
(Kazakhstan) Y Putintseva | 6 | 7

Quarterfinals
7 | (United States) J Pegula | 6 | 6
(Kazakhstan) Y Putintseva | 3 | 3

==== Section 4 ====
First round
(Spain) S Sorribes Tormo | 7^{7} | 2 | 7^{7}
Q | (United States) C Liu | 6^{4} | 6 | 6^{5}
(Kazakhstan) E Rybakina | 7 | 6^{3} | 6
Q | (Czech Republic) M Bouzková | 5 | 7^{7} | 1
Q | (United States) M Brengle | 1 | 3
10 | (United States) C Gauff | 6 | 6
15 | (Romania) S Halep | 6 | 6
LL | (Croatia) D Vekić | 0 | 2
(China) S Zhang | 6 | 6
Q | (Spain) C Bucșa | 1 | 3
(Switzerland) J Teichmann | 6 | 6
WC | (United States) V Williams | 2 | 3

Second round
6 | A Sabalenka | 6 | 6
(Spain) S Sorribes Tormo | 4 | 3
(Kazakhstan) E Rybakina | 4 | 7^{10} | 6^{3}
10 | (United States) C Gauff | 6 | 6^{8} | 7^{7}
15 | (Romania) S Halep | 6 | 6
(China) S Zhang | 4 | 2
(Switzerland) J Teichmann | 6 | 6
2 | (Estonia) A Kontaveit | 4 | 4

Third round
6 | A Sabalenka | 5 | 6 | 6^{4}
10 | (United States) C Gauff | 7 | 4 | 7^{7}
15 | (Romania) S Halep | 6 | 7
(Switzerland) J Teichmann | 2 | 5

Quarterfinals
10 | (United States) C Gauff | 4 | 6^{2}
15 | (Romania) S Halep | 6 | 7^{7}

== Seeded players ==
The following are the seeded players. Seedings are based on WTA rankings as of August 1, 2022. Rank and points before are as of August 8, 2022.

The event is not mandatory on the women's side and points from the 2021 tournament are included in the table below only if they counted towards the player's ranking as of August 8, 2022. For other players, the points defending column shows the lower of (a) points from her second-highest non-mandatory WTA 1000 tournament (which are required to be counted in her ranking) or (b) her 16th best result.

Points defending will be replaced at the end of the tournament by (a) the player's points from the 2022 tournament, (b) her 17th best result, or (c) points from her second-highest non-mandatory WTA 1000 event.

| Seed | Rank | Player | Points before | Points defending (or 16th best result) | Points won (or 17th best result) | Points after | Status |
|---|---|---|---|---|---|---|---|
| 1 | 1 | (Poland) Iga Świątek | 8,396 | (0)^{†} | 105 | 8,501 | Third round lost to (Brazil) Beatriz Haddad Maia |
| 2 | 2 | (Estonia) Anett Kontaveit | 4,476 | 1 | 1 | 4,476 | Second round lost to (Switzerland) Jil Teichmann |
| 3 | 4 | (Greece) Maria Sakkari | 4,190 | 105 | 105 | 4,190 | Third round lost to (Czech Republic) Karolína Plíšková [14] |
| 4 | 3 | (Spain) Paula Badosa | 4,190 | 60 | (25)^{†} | 4,155 | Second round retired against (Kazakhstan) Yulia Putintseva |
| 5 | 5 | (Tunisia) Ons Jabeur | 4,010 | 190 | (100)^{†} | 3,920 | Second round retired against (China) Zheng Qinwen |
| 6 | 6 | Aryna Sabalenka | 3,366 | 350 | 105 | 3,121 | Third round lost to (United States) Coco Gauff [10] |
| 7 | 7 | (United States) Jessica Pegula | 3,116 | 350 | 350 | 3,116 | Semifinals lost to (Romania) Simona Halep [15] |
| 8 | 8 | (Spain) Garbiñe Muguruza | 2,886 | 1 | 105 | 2,990 | Third round lost to (Switzerland) Belinda Bencic [12] |
| 9 | 10 | (United Kingdom) Emma Raducanu | 2,772 | (31)^{§} | 1 | 2,742 | First round lost to (Italy) Camila Giorgi |
| 10 | 11 | (United States) Coco Gauff | 2,746 | 190 | 190 | 2,746 | Quarterfinals lost to (Romania) Simona Halep [15] |
| 11 | 9 | Daria Kasatkina | 2,800 | 60 | (55)^{†} | 2,795 | First round lost to (Canada) Bianca Andreescu |
| 12 | 12 | (Switzerland) Belinda Bencic | 2,635 | (60)^{‡} | 190 | 2,765 | Quarterfinals lost to (Brazil) Beatriz Haddad Maia |
| 13 | 13 | (Canada) Leylah Fernandez | 2,534 | (25)^{§} | 60 | 2,569 | Second round lost to (Brazil) Beatriz Haddad Maia |
| 14 | 14 | (Czech Republic) Karolína Plíšková | 2,532 | 585 | 350 | 2,297 | Semifinals lost to (Brazil) Beatriz Haddad Maia |
| 15 | 15 | (Romania) Simona Halep | 2,415 | (60)^{‡} | 900 | 3,255 | Champion, defeated (Brazil) Beatriz Haddad Maia |
| 16 | 16 | (Latvia) Jeļena Ostapenko | 2,302 | 1 | 60 | 2,361 | Second round lost to (United States) Alison Riske-Amritraj |

† Points from the player's 16th best result (for points defending) or 17th best result (for points won), in each case as of August 8, 2022.
‡ Points from the player's second-best non-mandatory WTA 1000 event, which are required to be counted in her ranking.
§ The player is defending points from an ITF tournament (2021 Landisville or 2019 Vancouver).

=== Withdrawn players ===
The following players would have been seeded, but withdrew before the tournament began.

| Rank | Player | Points before | Points defending | Points after | Withdrawal reason |
|---|---|---|---|---|---|
| 17 | (United States) Danielle Collins | 2,273 | 105 | 2,168 | Neck injury |

== Other entry information ==
=== Wild cards ===
- (Canada) Rebecca Marino
- (Canada) Katherine Sebov
- (United States) Venus Williams
- (Canada) Carol Zhao

=== Protected ranking ===
- (United States) Sofia Kenin
- (United States) Serena Williams

=== Withdrawals ===
- Ekaterina Alexandrova → replaced by (China) Zheng Qinwen
- Victoria Azarenka → replaced by (Spain) Nuria Párrizas Díaz
- (Romania) Sorana Cîrstea → replaced by (Canada) Bianca Andreescu
- (United States) Danielle Collins → replaced by (Croatia) Donna Vekić
- Aliaksandra Sasnovich → replaced by (France) Caroline Garcia
- (Belgium) Alison Van Uytvanck → replaced by (United States) Sloane Stephens

=== Retirements ===
- (Spain) Paula Badosa (muscle cramping)
- (Tunisia) Ons Jabeur (abdominal pain)
- (Japan) Naomi Osaka (low back injury)

== Qualifying ==
=== Seeds ===
1. (Czech Republic) Marie Bouzková (qualified)
2. (Spain) Nuria Párrizas Díaz (qualifying competition, lucky loser)
3. Liudmila Samsonova (withdrew, competing in Washington)
4. (United States) Madison Brengle (qualified)
5. (Colombia) Camila Osorio (withdrew)
6. (Germany) Andrea Petkovic (first round)
7. (Australia) Ajla Tomljanović (qualified)
8. (Czech Republic) Tereza Martincová (qualified)
9. (China) Wang Xinyu (first round, retired)
10. (United States) Claire Liu (qualified)
11. (United Kingdom) Harriet Dart (qualifying competition)
12. (Croatia) Donna Vekić (qualifying competition, lucky loser)
13. (Australia) Daria Saville (withdrew, competing in Washington)
14. (Sweden) Rebecca Peterson (first round)
15. (Germany) Tatjana Maria (qualifying competition)
16. (United States) Lauren Davis (qualifying competition)

=== Qualifiers ===
1. (Czech Republic) Marie Bouzková
2. (Spain) Cristina Bucșa
3. (Australia) Storm Sanders
4. (United States) Madison Brengle
5. (United States) Claire Liu
6. (United States) Asia Muhammad
7. (Australia) Ajla Tomljanović
8. (Czech Republic) Tereza Martincová

=== Lucky losers ===
1. (Spain) Nuria Párrizas Díaz
2. (Croatia) Donna Vekić

=== Qualifying draw ===
==== First qualifier ====
First round
1 | (Czech Republic) Marie Bouzková | 6 | 6
(Greece) Valentini Grammatikopoulou | 2 | 0
(United Kingdom) Heather Watson | 1 | 0^{r}
15 | (Germany) Tatjana Maria | 6 | 0

Qualifying competition
1 | (Czech Republic) Marie Bouzková | 7 | 6
15 | (Germany) Tatjana Maria | 5 | 3

==== Second qualifier ====
First round
2 | (Spain) Nuria Párrizas Díaz | 7^{7} | 6
WC | (Canada) Kayla Cross | 6^{2} | 0
(Spain) Cristina Bucșa | 6 | 6
14 | (Sweden) Rebecca Peterson | 3 | 3

Qualifying competition
2 | (Spain) Nuria Párrizas Díaz | 4 | 3
(Spain) Cristina Bucșa | 6 | 6

==== Third qualifier ====
First round
Alt | (Australia) Storm Sanders | 6 | 7
(United States) Catherine Harrison | 0 | 5
(Germany) Laura Siegemund | 3 | 3
16 | (United States) Lauren Davis | 6 | 6

Qualifying competition
Alt | (Australia) Storm Sanders | 6 | 1 | 6
16 | (United States) Lauren Davis | 3 | 6 | 3

==== Fourth qualifier ====
First round
4 | (United States) Madison Brengle | 6 | 6
WC | (France) Elsa Jacquemot | 2 | 4
(United States) Grace Min | 3 | 4
Alt | (United States) Christina McHale | 6 | 6

Qualifying competition
4 | (United States) Madison Brengle | 6 | 6
Alt | (United States) Christina McHale | 3 | 2

==== Fifth qualifier ====
First round
Alt | (Australia) Ellen Perez | 6 | 7^{7}
(Australia) Priscilla Hon | 4 | 6^{2}
WC | (Canada) Victoria Mboko | 6 | 3 | 4
10 | (United States) Claire Liu | 3 | 6 | 6

Qualifying competition
Alt | (Australia) Ellen Perez | 3 | 0
10 | (United States) Claire Liu | 6 | 6

==== Sixth qualifier ====
First round
6 | (Germany) Andrea Petkovic | 3 | 2
(United States) Asia Muhammad | 6 | 6
(Israel) Lina Glushko | 4 | 2
12 | (Croatia) Donna Vekić | 6 | 6

Qualifying competition
(United States) Asia Muhammad | 7 | 6^{2} | 6
12 | (Croatia) Donna Vekić | 5 | 7^{7} | 1

==== Seventh qualifier ====
First round
7 | (Australia) Ajla Tomljanović | 7 | 7^{7}
PR | (Australia) Kimberly Birrell | 5 | 6^{5}
(Netherlands) Arianne Hartono | 3 | 3
11 | (United Kingdom) Harriet Dart | 6 | 6

Qualifying competition
7 | (Australia) Ajla Tomljanović | 4 | 6 | 6
11 | (United Kingdom) Harriet Dart | 6 | 1 | 3

==== Eighth qualifier ====
First round
8 | (Czech Republic) Tereza Martincová | 6 | 7
(United States) Emina Bektas | 3 | 5
WC | (Canada) Marina Stakusic | 6 | 0
9 | (China) Wang Xinyu | 1 | 0^{r}

Qualifying competition
8 | (Czech Republic) Tereza Martincová | 6 | 4 | 6
WC | (Canada) Marina Stakusic | 4 | 6 | 1
