= 2022 Citi Open – Women's doubles =

Women's doubles
- 2022 Citi Open

Final
- Champions: (United States) Jessica Pegula (New Zealand) Erin Routliffe
- Runners-up: Anna Kalinskaya (United States) Caty McNally
- Score: 6–3, 5–7, [12–10]

Details
- Draw: 16
- Seeds: 4

Events
Singles	men	women
Doubles	men	women
- Citi Open

Jessica Pegula and Erin Routliffe defeated the defending champion Caty McNally and her partner Anna Kalinskaya in the final, 6–3, 5–7, [12–10] to win the women's doubles tennis title at the 2022 Washington Open.

Coco Gauff and McNally were the reigning champions from when the event was last held in 2019, but Gauff did not participate.

== Seeds ==
1. (United States) Jessica Pegula / (New Zealand) Erin Routliffe (champions)
2. (Belgium) Elise Mertens / (Belgium) Greet Minnen (semifinals)
3. (Czech Republic) Lucie Hradecká / (Romania) Monica Niculescu (semifinals, retired)
4. Anna Kalinskaya / (United States) Caty McNally (final)

== Draw ==
Key

- Q = Qualifier
- WC = Wild card
- LL = Lucky loser
- Alt = Alternate
- ITF = ITF entry
- PR = Protected ranking
- SR = Special ranking
- SE = Special exempt
- JE = Junior exempt
- JR = Junior Accelerator Programme entrant
- CO = College Accelerator Programme entrant
- NG = Next Gen Accelerator Program entrant
- w/o = Walkover
- r = Retired
- d = Defaulted

=== Draw ===
First round
1	(United States) J Pegula (New Zealand) E Routliffe	6	6
(United States) S Santamaria (United Kingdom) H Watson	4	1
(Thailand) P Plipuech (Indonesia) J Rompies	1	4
(China) Xiy Wang (China) Y Yuan	6	6
3	(Czech Republic) L Hradecká (Romania) M Niculescu	6	6
(United Kingdom) E Raducanu (Denmark) C Tauson	4	1
(United States) S Chang (Australia) A Sharma	3	7	[9]
WC	(United States) M Jones (United States) S Stephens	6	5	[11]
(Brazil) I Gamarra Martins (United Kingdom) E Webley-Smith	6	3	[12]
(China) X Han (China) L Zhu	4	6	[10]
(United States) I Neel (Netherlands) R van der Hoek	7	4	[6]
4	A Kalinskaya (United States) C McNally	5	6	[10]
WC	(United States) J Loeb (United States) C McHale	6	6
(United States) M Brengle (Spain) C Bucșa	1	4
(United States) A Zamarripa (United States) M Zamarripa	3	6^{2}
2	(Belgium) E Mertens (Belgium) G Minnen	6	7^{7}

Quarterfinals
1	(United States) J Pegula (New Zealand) E Routliffe	6	4	[11]
(China) Xiy Wang (China) Y Yuan	3	6	[9]
3	(Czech Republic) L Hradecká (Romania) M Niculescu	7^{7}	3	[10]
WC	(United States) M Jones (United States) S Stephens	6^{4}	6	[2]
(Brazil) I Gamarra Martins (United Kingdom) E Webley-Smith	6^{2}	2
4	A Kalinskaya (United States) C McNally	7^{7}	6
WC	(United States) J Loeb (United States) C McHale	6	1	[5]
2	(Belgium) E Mertens (Belgium) G Minnen	4	6	[10]

Semifinals
1	(United States) J Pegula (New Zealand) E Routliffe	6	5
3	(Czech Republic) L Hradecká (Romania) M Niculescu	0	2^{r}
4	A Kalinskaya (United States) C McNally	7^{7}	7
2	(Belgium) E Mertens (Belgium) G Minnen	6^{4}	5

Final
1	(United States) J Pegula (New Zealand) E Routliffe	6	5	[12]
4	A Kalinskaya (United States) C McNally	3	7	[10]
