= 2022 Citi Open – Men's doubles =

Men's doubles
- 2022 Citi Open

Final
- Champions: (Australia) Nick Kyrgios (United States) Jack Sock
- Runners-up: (Croatia) Ivan Dodig (United States) Austin Krajicek
- Score: 7–5, 6–4

Details
- Draw: 16
- Seeds: 4

Events
Singles	men	women
Doubles	men	women
- Washington Open

The unseeded team of Nick Kyrgios and Jack Sock defeated Ivan Dodig and Austin Krajicek in the final, 7–5, 6–4 to win the men's doubles tennis title at the 2022 Washington Open.

Raven Klaasen and Ben McLachlan were the reigning champions, but chose to compete with different partners in Los Cabos instead.

== Seeds ==
1. (United States) Rajeev Ram / (Argentina) Horacio Zeballos (first round)
2. (Netherlands) Wesley Koolhof / (United Kingdom) Neal Skupski (first round)
3. (El Salvador) Marcelo Arévalo / (Netherlands) Jean-Julien Rojer (first round)
4. (Croatia) Ivan Dodig / (United States) Austin Krajicek (final)

== Draw ==
Key

- Q = Qualifier
- WC = Wild card
- LL = Lucky loser
- Alt = Alternate
- ITF = ITF entry
- PR = Protected ranking
- SR = Special ranking
- SE = Special exempt
- JE = Junior exempt
- JR = Junior Accelerator Programme entrant
- CO = College Accelerator Programme entrant
- NG = Next Gen Accelerator Program entrant
- w/o = Walkover
- r = Retired
- d = Defaulted

=== Draw ===
First round
1	(United States) R Ram (Argentina) H Zeballos	4	6	[2]
WC	(Australia) A de Minaur (United States) F Tiafoe	6	1	[10]
(United States) M McDonald (Netherlands) B van de Zandschulp	6	6^{5}	[10]
I Ivashka; A Rublev	4	7^{7}	[8]
3	(El Salvador) M Arévalo (Netherlands) J-J Rojer	4	4
(Australia) N Kyrgios (United States) J Sock	6	6
PR	(France) N Mahut (France) É Roger-Vasselin	6	6^{7}	[10]
(United Kingdom) J Murray (Brazil) B Soares	3	7^{9}	[4]
(Poland) H Hurkacz (United States) T Paul	6^{7}	4
(United Kingdom) D Evans (Australia) J Peers	7^{9}	6
Q	(Finland) E Ruusuvuori (Australia) L Saville	4	4
4	(Croatia) I Dodig (United States) A Krajicek	6	6
WC	(United States) D Kudla (Canada) D Shapovalov	4	4
(India) R Bopanna (Netherlands) M Middelkoop	6	6
(Colombia) JS Cabal (Colombia) R Farah	6	3	[10]
2	(Netherlands) W Koolhof (United Kingdom) N Skupski	4	6	[8]

Quarterfinals
WC	(Australia) A de Minaur (United States) F Tiafoe	w/o
(United States) M McDonald (Netherlands) B van de Zandschulp
(Australia) N Kyrgios (United States) J Sock	3	6	[10]
PR	(France) N Mahut (France) É Roger-Vasselin	6	2	[6]
(United Kingdom) D Evans (Australia) J Peers	7	6^{4}	[6]
4	(Croatia) I Dodig (United States) A Krajicek	5	7^{7}	[10]
(India) R Bopanna (Netherlands) M Middelkoop	7^{12}	4	[12]
(Colombia) JS Cabal (Colombia) R Farah	6^{10}	6	[10]

Semifinals
WC	(Australia) A de Minaur (United States) F Tiafoe
(Australia) N Kyrgios (United States) J Sock	w/o
4	(Croatia) I Dodig (United States) A Krajicek	7	6
(India) R Bopanna (Netherlands) M Middelkoop	5	3

Final
(Australia) N Kyrgios (United States) J Sock	7	6
4	(Croatia) I Dodig (United States) A Krajicek	5	4

== Qualifying ==
=== Seeds ===
1. (United States) Robert Galloway / (United States) Alex Lawson (qualifying competition)
2. (Finland) Emil Ruusuvuori / (Australia) Luke Saville (qualified)

=== Qualifiers ===
1. (Finland) Emil Ruusuvuori / (Australia) Luke Saville

=== Qualifying draw ===
First round
1	(United States) Robert Galloway (United States) Alex Lawson	6	7
Alt	(United States) Henry Barrett (United States) Matthew Mendez	1	5
WC	(United States) JC Aragone (United States) Marcos Giron	6	6^{6}	[3]
2	(Finland) Emil Ruusuvuori (Australia) Luke Saville	3	7^{8}	[10]

Qualifying competition
1	(United States) Robert Galloway (United States) Alex Lawson	6^{2}	6	[8]
2	(Finland) Emil Ruusuvuori (Australia) Luke Saville	7^{7}	4	[10]
