= 2022 Citi Open – Men's singles =

Men's singles
- 2022 Citi Open

Final
- Champion: (Australia) Nick Kyrgios
- Runner-up: (Japan) Yoshihito Nishioka
- Score: 6–4, 6–3

Details
- Draw: 48 (6Q / 4WC)
- Seeds: 16

Events
Singles	men	women
Doubles	men	women
- Washington Open

Nick Kyrgios defeated Yoshihito Nishioka in the final, 6–4, 6–3 to win the men's singles tennis title at the 2022 Washington Open. It was his second Washington title, following 2019. Kyrgios saved five match points en route to the title, in the quarterfinals against Frances Tiafoe. He also did not drop serve during the tournament.

Jannik Sinner was the reigning champion, but did not compete.

== Seeds ==
All seeds received a bye into the second round.

1. Andrey Rublev (semifinals)
2. (Poland) Hubert Hurkacz (second round)
3. (United States) Taylor Fritz (third round, retired)
4. (United States) Reilly Opelka (third round)
5. (Bulgaria) Grigor Dimitrov (third round)
6. (Canada) Denis Shapovalov (second round)
7. Karen Khachanov (third round)
8. (Netherlands) Botic van de Zandschulp (third round)
9. (Denmark) Holger Rune (third round)
10. (United States) Frances Tiafoe (quarterfinals)
11. (Australia) Alex de Minaur (second round)
12. (Argentina) Sebastián Báez (second round)
13. (United States) Maxime Cressy (third round)
14. (United States) Tommy Paul (second round)
15. Aslan Karatsev (second round)
16. (United Kingdom) Dan Evans (quarterfinals)

Click on the seed number of a player to go to their draw section.

== Draw ==
Key

- Q = Qualifier
- WC = Wild card
- LL = Lucky loser
- Alt = Alternate
- ITF = ITF entry
- PR = Protected ranking
- SR = Special ranking
- SE = Special exempt
- JE = Junior exempt
- JR = Junior Accelerator Programme entrant
- CO = College Accelerator Programme entrant
- NG = Next Gen Accelerator Program entrant
- w/o = Walkover
- r = Retired
- d = Defaulted

=== Finals ===
Quarterfinals
1	Andrey Rublev	6	6
WC	(United States) J. J. Wolf	2	3
16	(United Kingdom) Dan Evans	6^{5}	6	5
(Japan) Yoshihito Nishioka	7^{7}	4	7
10	(United States) Frances Tiafoe	7^{7}	6^{12}	2
(Australia) Nick Kyrgios	6^{5}	7^{14}	6
(United States) Sebastian Korda	2	7	3
(Sweden) Mikael Ymer	6	5	6

Semifinals
1	Andrey Rublev	3	4
(Japan) Yoshihito Nishioka	6	6
(Australia) Nick Kyrgios	7^{7}	6
(Sweden) Mikael Ymer	6^{4}	3

Final
(Japan) Yoshihito Nishioka	4	3
(Australia) Nick Kyrgios	6	6

=== Top half ===
==== Section 1 ====
First round
WC	(United States) S Kozlov	5	2
(United Kingdom) J Draper	7	6
(Belgium) D Goffin	6^{4}	4
(United States) J Sock	7^{7}	6
(Germany) P Gojowczyk	5	4
(France) B Paire	7	6
WC	(United States) J. J. Wolf	6	6
Q	(Japan) T Daniel	2	3

Second round
1	A Rublev	6	6
(United Kingdom) J Draper	4	2
(United States) J Sock	6	4	0
13	(United States) M Cressy	4	6	6
9	(Denmark) H Rune	6	6
(France) B Paire	3	2
WC	(United States) J. J. Wolf	6	6^{5}	6
6	(Canada) D Shapovalov	2	7^{7}	3

Third round
1	A Rublev	6	7^{10}
13	(United States) M Cressy	4	6^{8}
9	(Denmark) H Rune	5	6	3
WC	(United States) J. J. Wolf	7	4	6

Quarterfinals
1	A Rublev	6	6
WC	(United States) J. J. Wolf	2	3

==== Section 2 ====
First round
Q	(Chinese Taipei) T-l Wu	3^{r}
(Australia) A Popyrin	3
PR	(United Kingdom) K Edmund	6	7^{10}
Q	(Japan) Y Watanuki	4	6^{8}
(Japan) Y Nishioka	6	6
(United States) J Brooksby	4	3
Q	(Germany) D Koepfer	3	6	6
(South Korea) S-w Kwon	6	3	4

Second round
3	(United States) T Fritz	6	6
(Australia) A Popyrin	4	3
PR	(United Kingdom) K Edmund	1	2
16	(United Kingdom) D Evans	6	6
11	(Australia) A de Minaur	6	6^{6}	2
(Japan) Y Nishioka	3	7^{8}	6
Q	(Germany) D Koepfer	7^{7}	5	4
7	K Khachanov	6^{3}	7	6

Third round
3	(United States) T Fritz	6	6^{6}	1^{r}
16	(United Kingdom) D Evans	3	7^{8}	4
(Japan) Y Nishioka	7^{7}	7^{7}
7	K Khachanov	6^{2}	6^{1}

Quarterfinals
16	(United Kingdom) D Evans	6^{5}	6	5
(Japan) Y Nishioka	7^{7}	4	7

=== Bottom half ===
==== Section 3 ====
First round
(Australia) J Duckworth	6	6^{4}	2
Q	(Croatia) B Gojo	4	7^{7}	6
(France) B Bonzi	6	3	5
WC	(United States) C Eubanks	3	6	7
(Australia) N Kyrgios	6	6
(United States) M Giron	3	2
(United States) D Kudla	1	6	6
Q	(United States) M Mmoh	6	3	4

Second round
8	(Netherlands) B van de Zandschulp	7^{8}	6^{5}	6
Q	(Croatia) B Gojo	6^{6}	7^{7}	4
WC	(United States) C Eubanks	3	6^{2}
10	(United States) F Tiafoe	6	7^{7}
14	(United States) T Paul	3	4
(Australia) N Kyrgios	6	6
(United States) D Kudla	7^{8}	4	4
4	(United States) R Opelka	6^{6}	6	6

Third round
8	(Netherlands) B van de Zandschulp	6	2	3
10	(United States) F Tiafoe	4	6	6
(Australia) N Kyrgios	7^{7}	6
4	(United States) R Opelka	6^{1}	2

Quarterfinals
10	(United States) F Tiafoe	7^{7}	6^{12}	2
(Australia) N Kyrgios	6^{5}	7^{14}	6

==== Section 4 ====
First round
(France) A Mannarino	6	6
WC	(United States) B Klahn	2	4
(United States) S Korda	6	7^{7}
I Ivashka	4	6^{5}
(United Kingdom) A Murray	6^{8}	6	1
(Sweden) M Ymer	7^{10}	4	6
(United States) M McDonald	6	4	4
(Finland) E Ruusuvuori	1	6	6

Second round
5	(Bulgaria) G Dimitrov	6	3	7
(France) A Mannarino	1	6	5
(United States) S Korda	6	6
12	(Argentina) S Báez	1	4
15	A Karatsev	4	6	4
(Sweden) M Ymer	6	3	6
(Finland) E Ruusuvuori	6	7^{7}
2	(Poland) H Hurkacz	4	6^{3}

Third round
5	(Bulgaria) G Dimitrov	6	1	2
(United States) S Korda	4	6	6
(Sweden) M Ymer	6	6^{3}	6
(Finland) E Ruusuvuori	3	7^{7}	4

Quarterfinals
(United States) S Korda	2	7	3
(Sweden) M Ymer	6	5	6

== Qualifying ==
=== Seeds ===
1. (Japan) Taro Daniel (qualified)
2. (Germany) Dominik Koepfer (qualified)
3. (United States) Michael Mmoh (qualified)
4. (United States) Mitchell Krueger (qualifying competition)
5. (France) Antoine Escoffier (qualifying competition)
6. (Chinese Taipei) Wu Tung-lin (qualified)
7. (United States) Bjorn Fratangelo (first round)
8. (Croatia) Borna Gojo (qualified)
9. (Japan) Yosuke Watanuki (qualified)
10. (United States) Alex Rybakov (qualifying competition)
11. (Japan) Shintaro Mochizuki (qualifying competition)
12. (United States) JC Aragone (qualifying competition)

=== Qualifiers ===
1. (Japan) Taro Daniel
2. (Germany) Dominik Koepfer
3. (United States) Michael Mmoh
4. (Japan) Yosuke Watanuki
5. (Croatia) Borna Gojo
6. (Chinese Taipei) Wu Tung-lin

=== Draw ===
==== First qualifier ====
First round
1	(Japan) Taro Daniel	6	6
WC	(United States) Noah Rubin	2	0
(United States) Thai-Son Kwiatkowski	6	1	3
10	(United States) Alex Rybakov	4	6	6

Qualifying competition
1	(Japan) Taro Daniel	6	6
10	(United States) Alex Rybakov	3	4

==== Second qualifier ====
First round
2	(Germany) Dominik Koepfer	6	6
WC	(United States) Ryan Colby	0	0
Alt	(United States) Alex Lawson	1	2
11	(Japan) Shintaro Mochizuki	6	6

Qualifying competition
2	(Germany) Dominik Koepfer	6	6
11	(Japan) Shintaro Mochizuki	3	4

==== Third qualifier ====
First round
3	(United States) Michael Mmoh	6	6
Alt	(United States) Raymond Sarmiento	4	2
Alt	(United States) Bruno Kuzuhara	3	7^{7}	4
12	(United States) JC Aragone	6	6^{3}	6

Qualifying competition
3	(United States) Michael Mmoh	6	6
12	(United States) JC Aragone	3	1

==== Fourth qualifier ====
First round
4	(United States) Mitchell Krueger	7	6
(United States) Sekou Bangoura	5	4
WC	(United States) Andrew Fenty	5	0^{r}
9	(Japan) Yosuke Watanuki	7	1

Qualifying competition
4	(United States) Mitchell Krueger	6^{1}	3
9	(Japan) Yosuke Watanuki	7^{7}	6

==== Fifth qualifier ====
First round
5	(France) Antoine Escoffier	7^{11}	6
(Italy) Roberto Marcora	6^{9}	0
Alt	(United States) Robert Galloway	3	4
8	(Croatia) Borna Gojo	6	6

Qualifying competition
5	(France) Antoine Escoffier	5	3
8	(Croatia) Borna Gojo	7	6

==== Sixth qualifier ====
First round
6	(Chinese Taipei) Wu Tung-lin	6	6
WC	(United States) Benjamin Kittay	3	3
Alt	(Australia) Luke Saville	7^{7}	6
7	(United States) Bjorn Fratangelo	6^{4}	2

Qualifying competition
6	(Chinese Taipei) Wu Tung-lin	6	7
Alt	(Australia) Luke Saville	2	5
