= Nick Kyrgios =

Australian tennis player (born 1995)

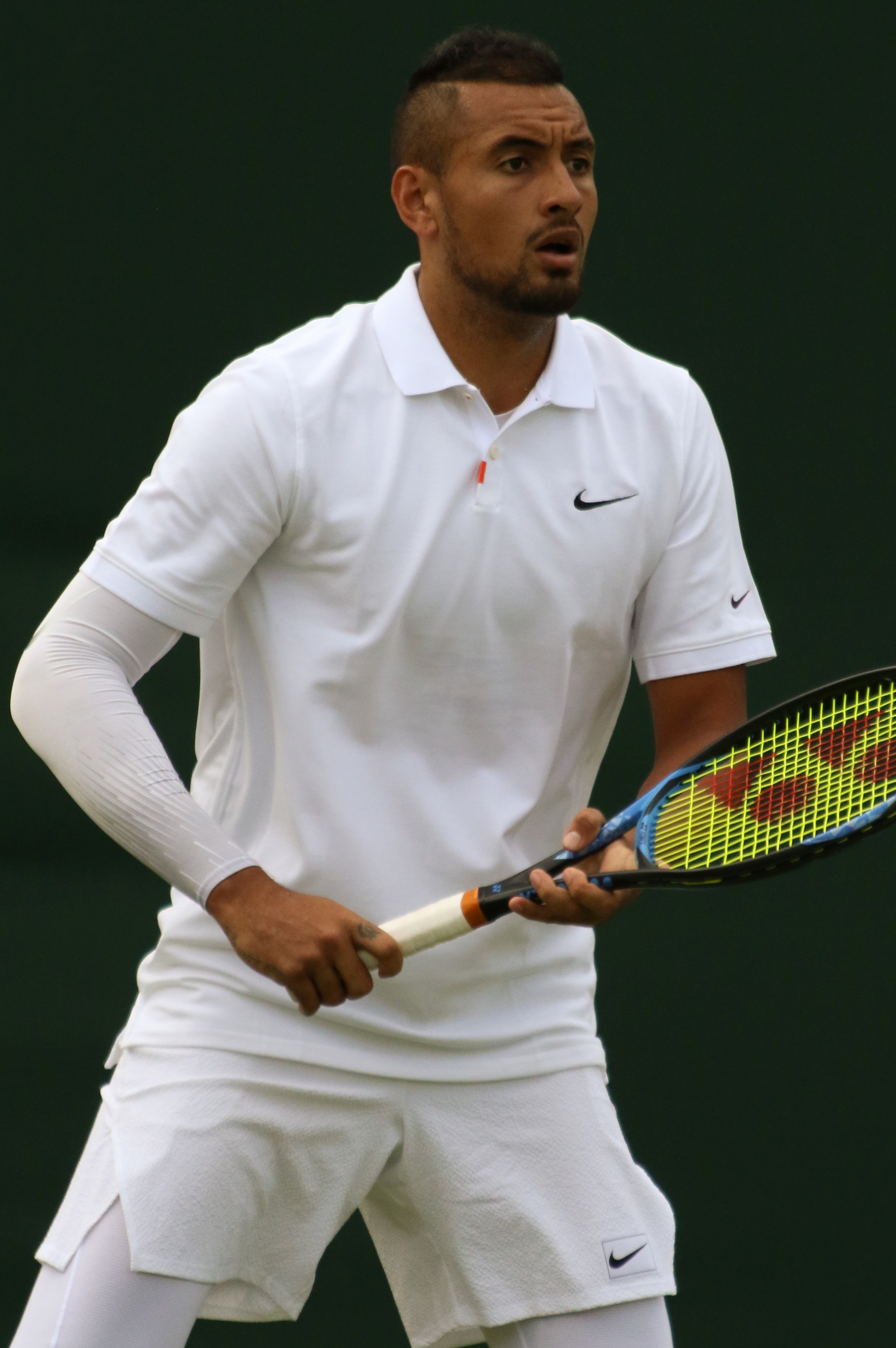
- Kyrgios at 2019 Wimbledon
- Full name: Nicholas Hilmy Kyrgios
- Country (sports): Australia
- Residence: Nassau, Bahamas
- Born: 27 April 1995 (age 31) Canberra, Australian Capital Territory, Australia
- Height: 1.93 m (6 ft 4 in)
- Turned pro: 2013
- Plays: Right-handed (two-handed backhand)
- Prize money: US $13,374,911
- Official website: nickkyrgios.org

Singles
- Career record: 207–121 (58.4%)
- Career titles: 7
- Highest ranking: No. 13 (24 October 2016)
- Current ranking: No. 912 (2 November 2026)

Grand Slam singles results
- Australian Open: QF (2015)
- French Open: 3R (2015, 2016)
- Wimbledon: F (2022)
- US Open: QF (2022)

Doubles
- Career record: 71–62 (53.4%)
- Career titles: 4
- Highest ranking: No. 11 (7 November 2022)
- Current ranking: No. 1356 (2 November 2026)

Grand Slam doubles results
- Australian Open: W (2022)
- French Open: 3R (2017)
- Wimbledon: 1R (2026)
- US Open: 3R (2016, 2022)

Other doubles tournaments
- Tour Finals: RR (2022)

Mixed doubles
- Career record: 8–8

Grand Slam mixed doubles results
- Australian Open: 2R (2020, 2026)
- Wimbledon: 2R (2015, 2021)
- US Open: 2R (2015)

Team competitions
- Davis Cup: SF (2015, 2017)
- Hopman Cup: W (2016)
- Last updated on: 2 November 2026.

Nicholas Hilmy Kyrgios (/ˈkɪriɒs/ KIRR-ee-oss; born 27 April 1995) is an Australian professional tennis player. Kyrgios has been ranked as high as world No. 13 by the ATP, achieved in October 2016. He has won seven ATP Tour singles titles and reached a major final at the 2022 Wimbledon Championships. In doubles, Kyrgios has a career-high ranking of world No. 11, achieved on 7 November 2022, and won four titles, including a major title at the 2022 Australian Open partnering Thanasi Kokkinakis.

Kyrgios is only the third player, after Dominik Hrbatý and Lleyton Hewitt, to have beaten each of the Big Three (Novak Djokovic, Roger Federer, and Rafael Nadal) the first time he played against them. Kyrgios is often described as a "polarising player" because of his "unique, unfiltered and unapologetic personality" which goes alongside his "on-court brilliance and audacious shot-making" in both singles and doubles. In his junior career, Kyrgios won the singles event at the 2013 Australian Open and the doubles events at the 2012 French Open, 2012 Wimbledon Championships and 2013 Wimbledon Championships.

In August 2026 Kyrgios was suspended from tennis for a month after testing positive for cocaine.

== Early life and family ==
Kyrgios was born on 27 April 1995 in Canberra, Australia, to a father of Greek origin, George, and a Malay mother, Norlaila ("Nill"). His father is a self-employed house painter, and his mother is a retired computer engineer. His mother was born in Malaysia as a member of the Pahang royal family, but she dropped her title as a princess when she moved to Australia in her twenties. He has two siblings: a sister, Halimah, and a brother, Christos. Kyrgios's paternal grandparents are from Georgani, a small village in Ioannina, Greece; they moved to Australia in 1960.

Kyrgios attended Radford College until Year 8 and completed his Year 12 certificate in 2012 at Daramalan College in Canberra. He also played basketball in his early teens before deciding to focus solely on tennis when he was 14 years old. Two years later, he received a full scholarship at the Australian Institute of Sport, where he was able to further develop his tennis.

In 2013, Kyrgios relocated his training base from Canberra to Melbourne Park in an attempt to further his career with better facilities and hitting partners. A year later, Tennis ACT announced a $27 million redevelopment of the Lyneham Tennis Centre in Canberra to lure Kyrgios back home and host Davis Cup and Fed Cup ties. Kyrgios confirmed in January 2015 that he would return home and base himself in Canberra. He also donated $10,000 towards the redevelopment of the Lyneham Tennis Centre there.

== Junior career ==
Kyrgios played his first junior match in 2008 at the age of 13 at a grade 4 tournament in Australia. He won his first ITF junior tour title in Fiji in June 2010, aged 15. He started to compete more regularly on the junior tour in 2011, making his junior grand slam debut at the 2011 Australian Open. During 2012 he won two junior grand slam doubles titles and rose to junior world number three, though he withdrew from the Australian Open Men's Wildcard Playoff due to injury.

Moving into 2013, he gained the number 1 junior ranking by defeating Wayne Montgomery in the Traralgon International final. A week later he entered the Australian Open as the juniors number 3 seed and progressed to the final against fellow Australian Thanasi Kokkinakis. After saving two set points in the first set, Kyrgios won his first and only junior grand slam title. He also won Wimbledon junior doubles with Kokkinakis.

== Professional career ==
=== 2012–2013: Turning pro ===
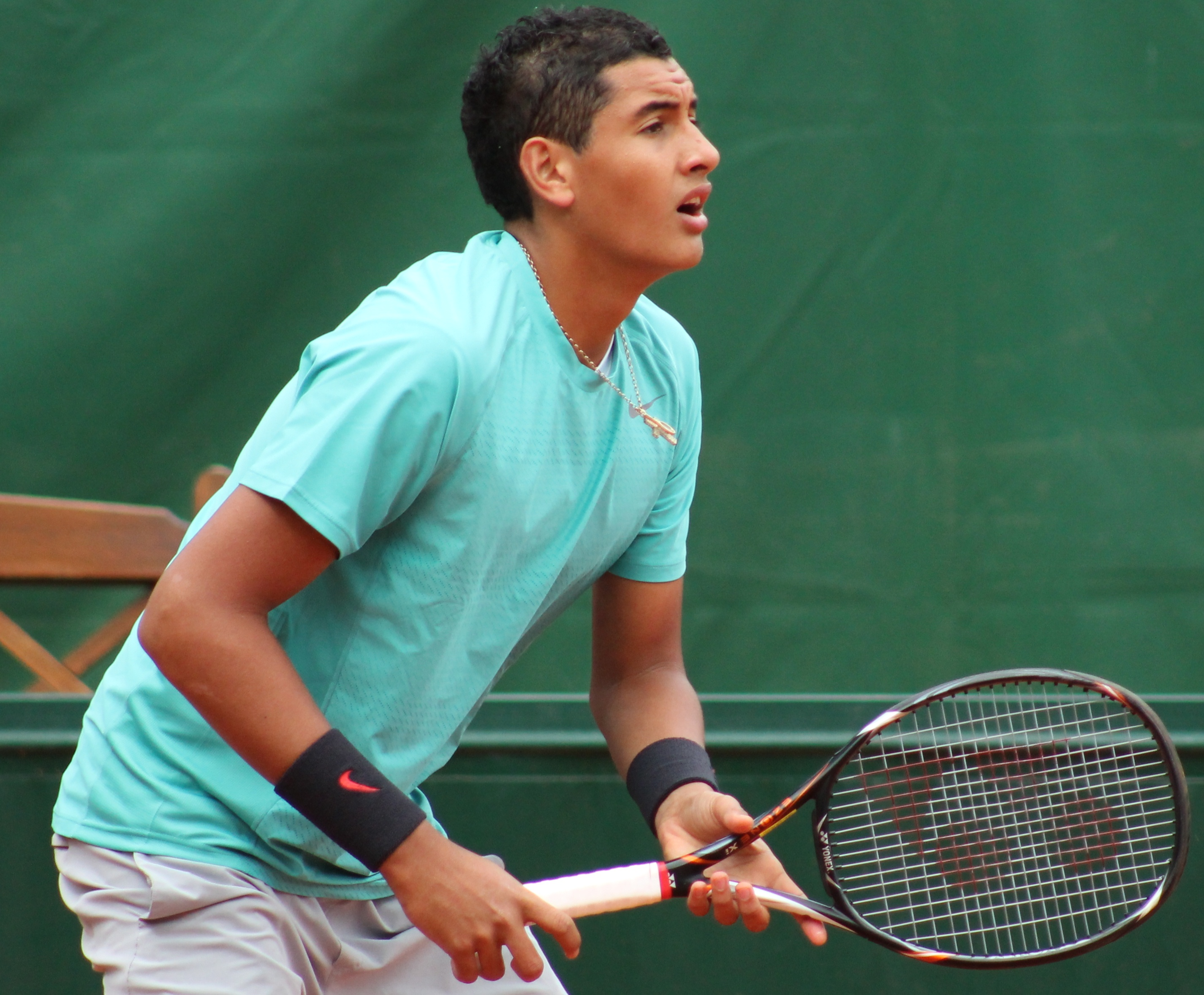
Kyrgios at the 2013 French Open

In 2012, in his first-round qualifying match at the Australian Open, Kyrgios won the first set in a tiebreak, but his opponent Mathieu Rodrigues cruised through the second and third sets to defeat him. In March 2012, Ouyang Bowen was the first player that Kyrgios defeated in a professional tournament, at an ITF Futures event, in Japan. Kyrgios continued to compete on the 2012 ITF Men's Circuit for the rest of the season, competing in tournaments in Australia, Germany, Japan and Slovenia. At the end of the season, he had reached a semifinal and a quarterfinal in Australian tournaments. He finished the year ranked No. 838. In 2013, Kyrgios started the season by playing at the 2013 Brisbane International, losing in the first round of qualifying to James Duckworth. He then lost in the first round of qualifying at the 2013 Australian Open to Bradley Klahn in straight sets. After winning the Boys' Singles, Kyrgios said his goal was to reach the top 300 by the end of the year.

At the 2013 Nature's Way Sydney Tennis International, Kyrgios defeated fellow Australian Matt Reid in straight sets in the finals to win his first challenger tour title at the age of 17. Kyrgios was given a wildcard into the qualifying competition of the 2013 French Open, but on 20 May it was announced that John Millman was withdrawing from the main draw due to injury, such that Kyrgios's wildcard was raised to the main draw. This meant he would compete in a main draw of a Grand Slam tournament for the first time. In the first round, Kyrgios had the biggest win of his career to date against the former world No. 8 Radek Štěpánek in three sets, each ending in tiebreaks, giving him the first ATP Tour level win of his career.

Although he lost to Marin Čilić in the following round, his ranking rose to No. 213. Kyrgios later qualified for the 2013 US Open, where he was beaten by fourth seed David Ferrer in his opening match. He reached a new career high ranking of No. 186 on 9 September 2013. In October, Kyrgios made the semifinal of the 2013 Sacramento Challenger, before falling to Tim Smyczek. He ended the 2013 season with a singles ranking of 182.

=== 2014: Wimbledon quarterfinal ===
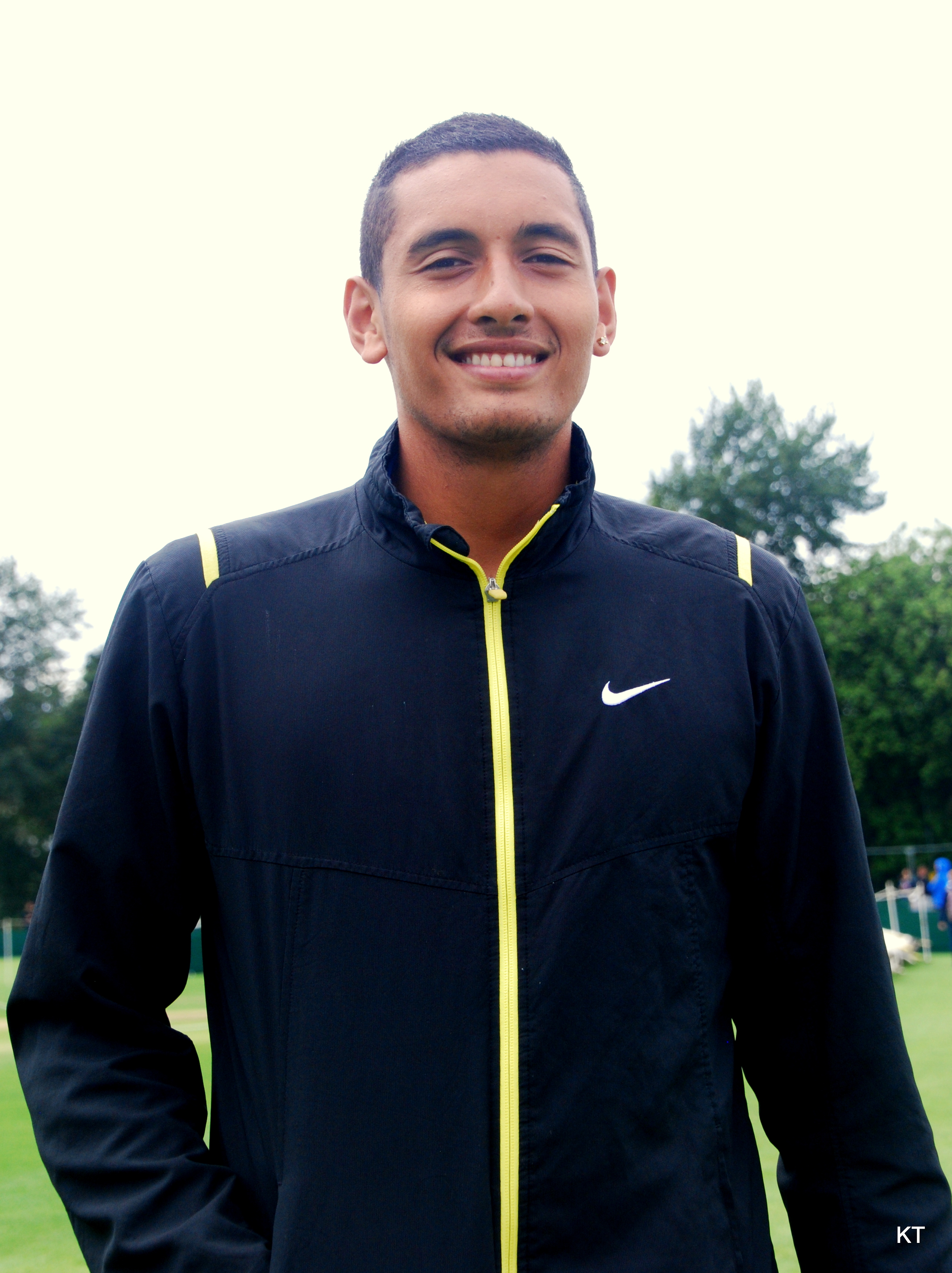
Kyrgios at the 2014 Wimbledon Championships

At the beginning of the 2014 season, Kyrgios was set to debut at the 2014 Brisbane International as a wildcard, but withdrew due to a shoulder injury. On 8 January, Kyrgios was awarded a wildcard into the 2014 Australian Open, where he won his first round match against Benjamin Becker. However, he lost in the second round to Benoît Paire, in five sets. Kyrgios received a wildcard into the 2014 U.S. National Indoor Tennis Championships, where he lost in the first round to Tim Smyczek in three sets. Kyrgios was then forced to withdraw from numerous ATP tournaments in Delray Beach and Acapulco due to an elbow injury.

At the 2014 Sarasota Open, Kyrgios reached the final by defeating Jarmere Jenkins, Rubén Ramírez Hidalgo, Donald Young and Daniel Kosakowski. He defeated Filip Krajinović in straight sets for his second career challenger title. Following this, Kyrgios defeated Jack Sock to win the 2014 Savannah Challenger. As a wildcard at the 2014 French Open, Kyrgios was defeated in the first round in straight sets by Milos Raonic. Kyrgios then won his fourth career challenger title at the 2014 Aegon Nottingham Challenge, beating fellow Australian Sam Groth in straight-set tiebreaks. In June, Kyrgios received a wildcard to the 2014 Wimbledon Championships. After defeating Stéphane Robert in the first round, he went on to beat Richard Gasquet in a five-set second-round thriller; wherein, he lost the first two sets and saved nine match points. In the third round, Kyrgios beat Jiří Veselý, before going on to get the biggest win of his career so far by beating World No. 1 Rafael Nadal in four sets –– becoming the first male debutant to reach the Wimbledon quarterfinals since Florian Mayer, in 2004. The 'shot of the match' was a rear-forehand, half-volley winner from between Kyrgios's legs that David Polkinghorne, of The Canberra Times, called "freakish" and "audacious". Kyrgios subsequently lost to Milos Raonic in four sets in the quarterfinals. This Wimbledon performance helped Kyrgios make it into the top 100 of the ATP World Rankings for the first time in his career: i.e. Kyrgios's ranking rose to No. 66. Post-Wimbledon, at the Rogers Cup tournament in Toronto, Kyrgios earned his first ATP World Tour Masters event win, with a first round victory over Santiago Giraldo in straight sets. However, Kyrgios lost in the second round to Andy Murray, winning just four games.

In the US Open, Kyrgios made it to the third round, defeating Mikhail Youzhny and Andreas Seppi on his way, before losing to 16th seed Tommy Robredo. Kyrgios later played in the Malaysian Open, but lost in the first round. He skipped the rest of the season, citing burnout. He ended the year ranked No. 52 in the world, and the No. 2 ranked Australian behind Lleyton Hewitt.

=== 2015: First final, top 30 ===
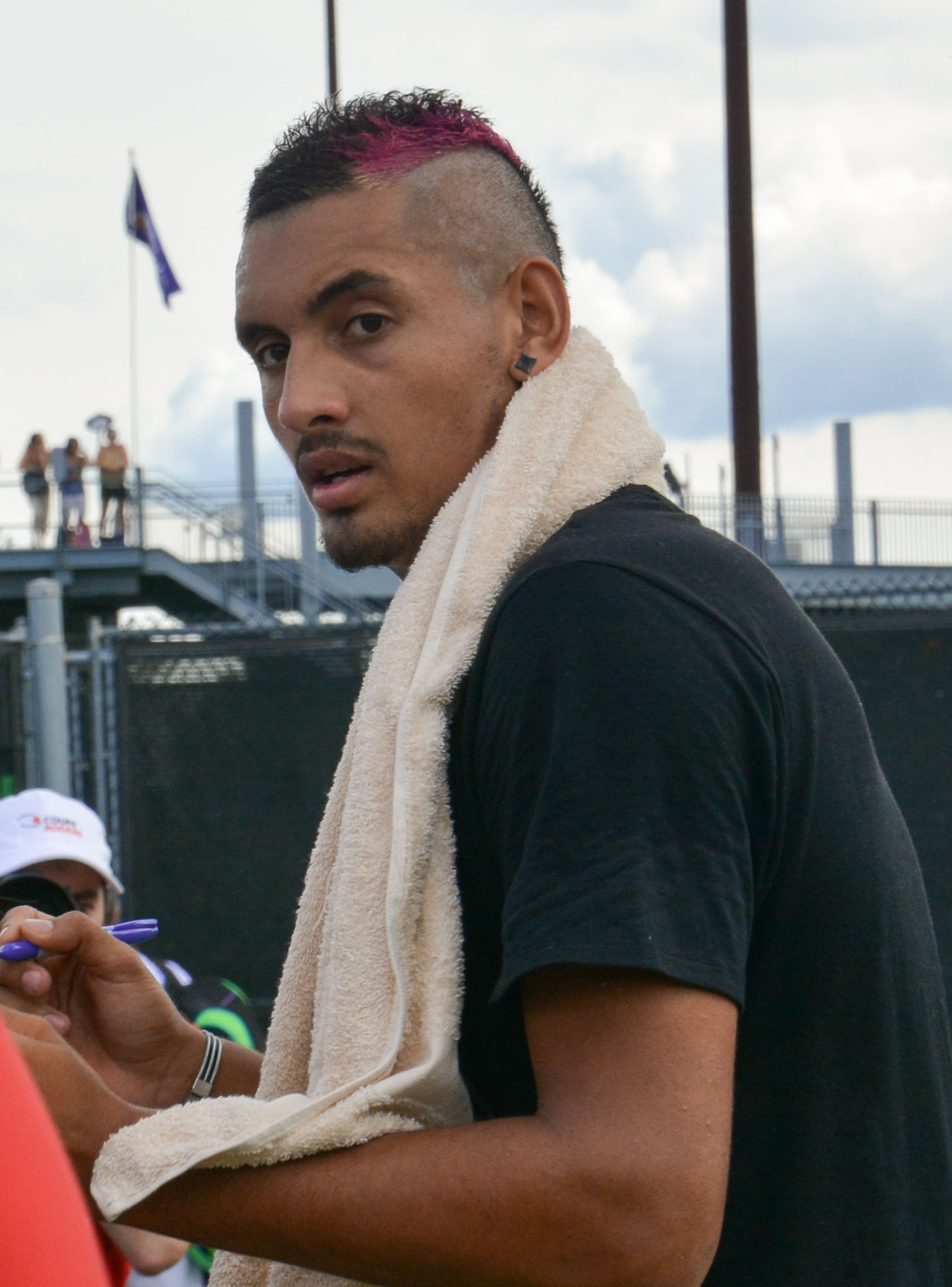
Kyrgios in 2015

Kyrgios started the season off at the Sydney International, but lost his opening match against Jerzy Janowicz in three tightly contested sets. During the 2015 Australian Open, Kyrgios received direct entry into the tournament for the first time due to his ranking. In his opening match, he defeated Federico Delbonis in a five-set thriller, before going on to beat Ivo Karlović and Malek Jaziri in second and third rounds, respectively. He then faced Andreas Seppi, who had just beaten Roger Federer in his previous match, in the fourth round. Kyrgios fell two sets behind and faced down a match point in the fourth set but recovered to win in five sets. As a result, Kyrgios became the first male teenager to reach two Grand Slam quarterfinals since Federer in 2001, the first Australian male to reach the quarterfinals since Hewitt in 2005, and the first Australian of any gender to reach the quarterfinals since Jelena Dokic in 2009. In the quarterfinals, Kyrgios lost to eventual finalist Andy Murray in straight sets. After the tournament, he reached a career-high ranking of no. 35 in the world.

Kyrgios later withdrew from tournaments in Marseille and Dubai due to a back injury he suffered during the Australian Open. In Indian Wells, he served for the match against Grigor Dimitrov, but rolled his ankle and ultimately lost. Kyrgios returned in the Barcelona Open. After receiving a bye in the first round, he lost in three sets to fellow 19-year-old Elias Ymer. At the Estoril Open, Kyrgios reached the final of an ATP tournament for the first time in his career, after defeating Albert Ramos Viñolas, Filip Krajinović, Robin Haase and Pablo Carreño Busta. He then lost the final to Richard Gasquet, in straight sets.

At the Madrid Open a week later, Kyrgios defeated world No. 2 and 17-time Grand Slam champion Roger Federer in the second round, after saving two match points in the final set tiebreak. He then had a three-set loss to John Isner in the third round. At this point, until his finalist appearance at Estoril and third round finish in Madrid, Kyrgios had the unique distinction of having won more Grand Slam matches (10) than ATP Tour matches (2).

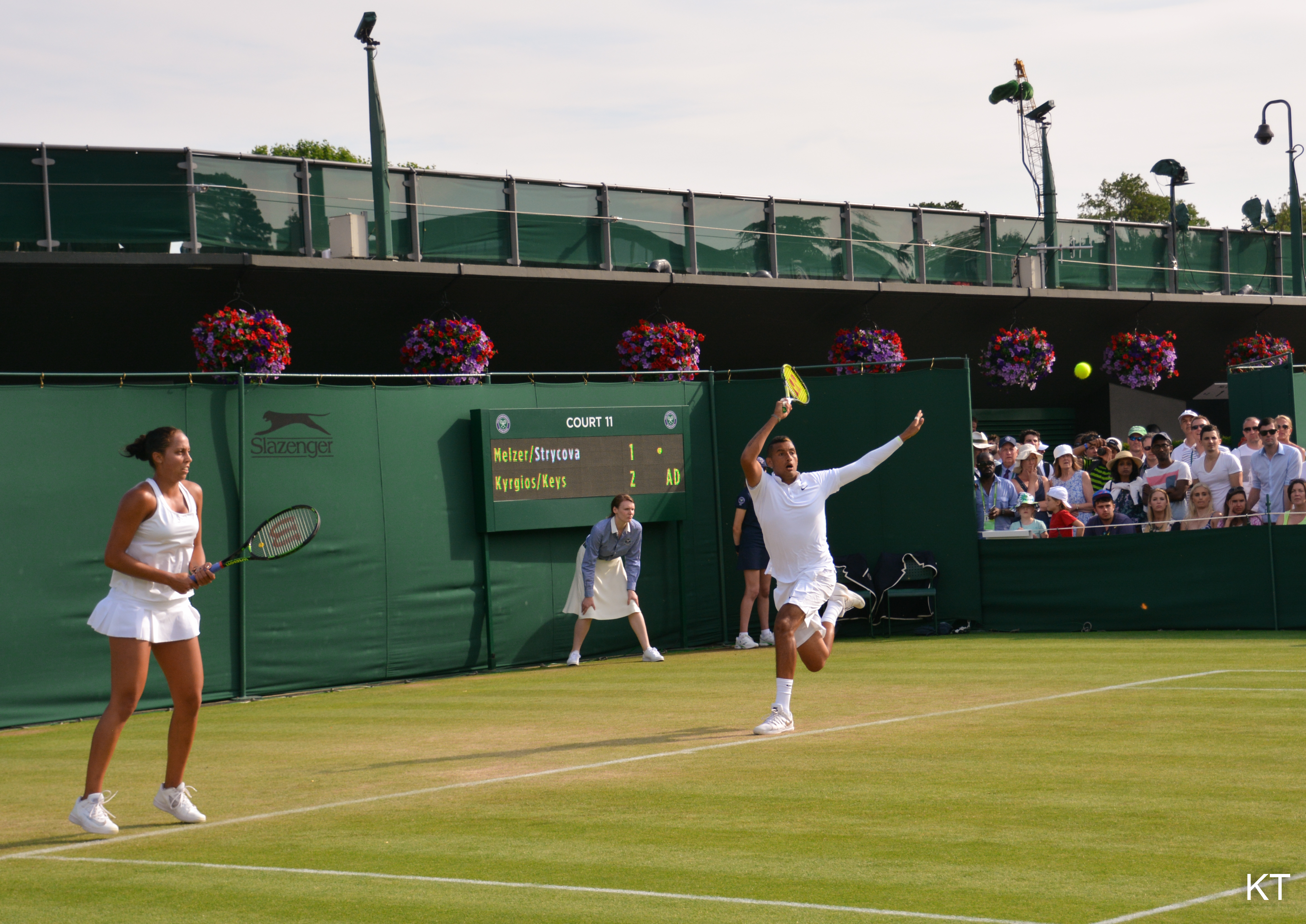
Wimbledon 2015: Madison Keys & Nick Kyrgios during their 1st round match against Barbora Strycova & Jurgen Melzer

At the French Open, Kyrgios was seeded 29th, his first Grand Slam seeding. He won in straight sets in the first round against Denis Istomin. He then received a walkover into the third round, after Kyle Edmund withdrew with injury. In the third round, he lost in straight sets to third seed Andy Murray. In the doubles, Kyrgios and partner Mahesh Bhupathi lost in the first round to wildcards Thanasi Kokkinakis and Lucas Pouille.

At the 2015 Wimbledon Championships, Kyrgios opened with straight-set victories over Diego Schwartzman and Juan Mónaco in the first and second rounds, respectively. In the third round, despite losing the first set, he advanced past seventh seed Milos Raonic ––before losing to Gasquet in the fourth round, squandering set points in the fourth. He also played mixed doubles with Madison Keys, but only reached the second round. Kyrgios fell out of the top 40 in the rankings following the tournament.

=== 2016: Hopman Cup champion, 3 titles, top 15 ===
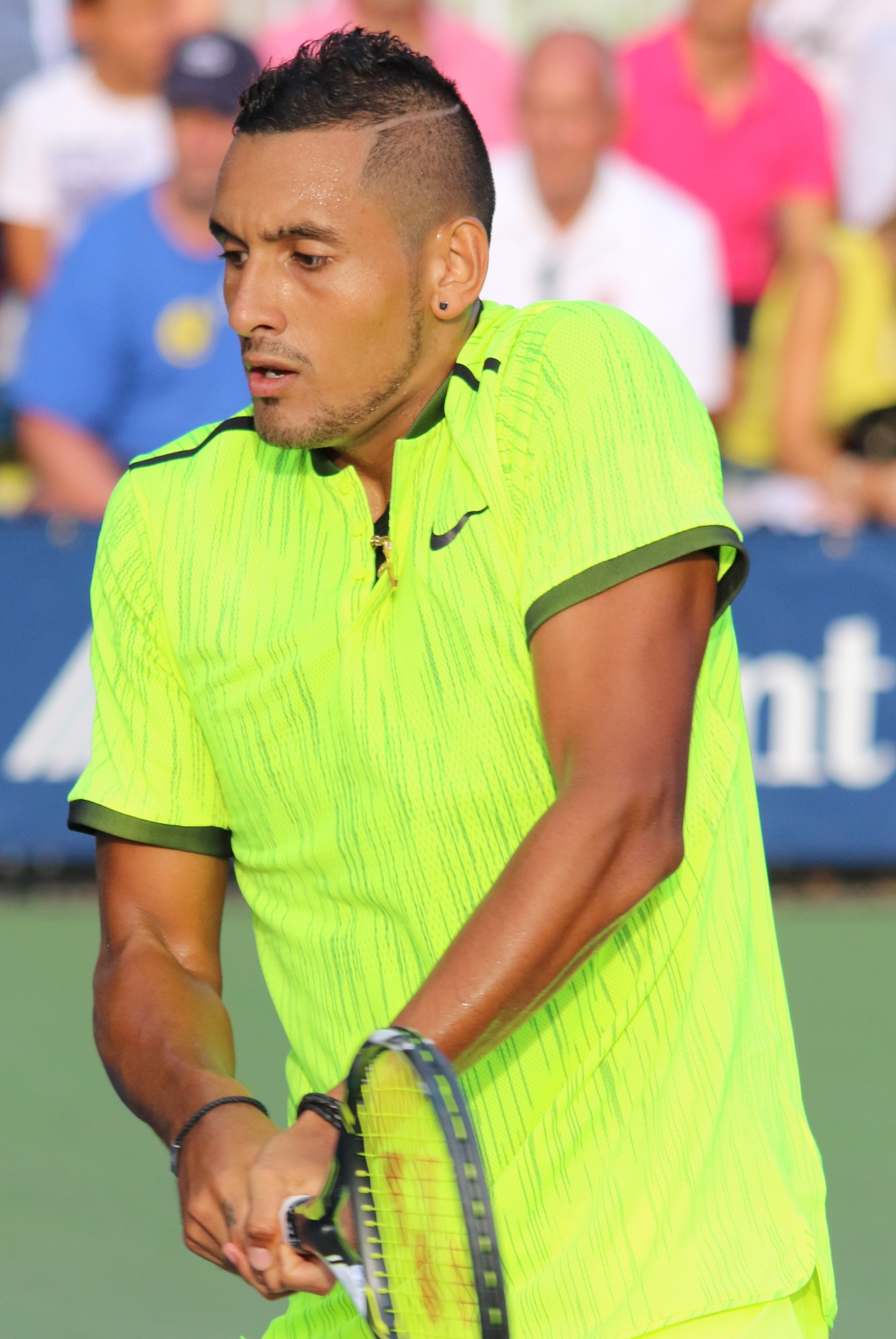
Kyrgios playing at the 2016 US Open

At the 2016 Hopman Cup, Kyrgios partnered with Daria Gavrilova, as part of the Australia Green team. During the round robin, Australia Green won 3–0 against Germany, with Kyrgios winning both his singles match against Alexander Zverev and mixed doubles match with Gavrilova. The Australian Green team next faced off against Great Britain; where Kyrgios recorded his first-ever win over Andy Murray (in straight sets) and also won the doubles, claiming a 2–1 win over the British team. Following this, he went on to win the Hopman Cup alongside Gavrilova, defeating Ukraine in the final – marking Kyrgios's first title on the World Tour.

At the 2016 Australian Open, Kyrgios claimed straight-set wins over Pablo Carreño Busta and Pablo Cuevas before losing to sixth-ranked Tomáš Berdych in the third round in 4 sets. Kyrgios won his maiden ATP title at the Open 13 in Marseille by defeating Richard Gasquet in the quarterfinal, Berdych in the semi-final and lastly, Čilić in the final, all in straight sets. Notably, Kyrgios finished the tournament without having his serve broken. During the Dubai Tennis Championships Kyrgios reached the semifinals, where he retired against Stan Wawrinka. At the 2016 Indian Wells tournament, he lost in the first round to Albert Ramos Viñolas.

At the 2016 Miami Open Kyrgios reached his first ATP World Tour Masters 1000 semifinal, with straight-set wins over Marcos Baghdatis, Tim Smyczek, Andrey Kuznetsov and Milos Raonic – before losing in the semis to Kei Nishikori. Following Miami Open, Kyrgios entered the top 20 for the first time, becoming the youngest player to do so since Čilić seven years earlier. At the French Open, Kyrgios entered as the 14th seed and went on to beat Marco Cecchinato and Igor Sijsling, reaching the third round; however, he lost to 9th seed Gasquet. Similarly, at Wimbledon (as the 15th seed), he advanced to the fourth round after defeating Radek Štěpánek, Dustin Brown and Feliciano López – losing to eventual champion Murray.

In Atlanta, as the second seed, Kyrgios advanced to the final after defeating wildcard Jared Donaldson, Fernando Verdasco and Yoshihito Nishioka. In the final, Kyrgios faced three-time defending champion Isner and defeated him to win his second ATP title. Kyrgios reached a career-high ranking of No. 16 following the tournament.

At the US Open, Kyrgios reached the third round against Illya Marchenko before retiring with a hip injury that had also affected him in previous rounds. He returned with a straight-set win in his rubber for Australia in the Davis Cup World Group playoff. In October, after a second-round loss to Kevin Anderson at the 2016 Chengdu Open, Kyrgios bounced back by winning his first ATP World Tour 500 series title in Tokyo, at the 2016 Japan Open Tennis Championships, beating David Goffin.

=== 2017: First Masters final ===
At the 2017 Australian Open, Kyrgios was seeded 14th. He defeated Gastão Elias before falling to Andreas Seppi in round two, despite leading by two sets to love. At the Mexican Open, Kyrgios defeated Novak Djokovic in straight sets in the quarter-finals. Djokovic managed to win just 20.5% of return points in the match, his lowest ever in a tour match. Kyrgios fell to eventual champion Sam Querrey in 3 sets in the semifinals. Kyrgios defeated Djokovic again in straight sets in the fourth round of the Indian Wells Masters tournament. He then withdrew from his quarterfinal match with Federer due to illness. He moved to Miami, where he beat Goffin and Zverev before losing in the semifinals in three tiebreak sets to Federer in three hours and ten minutes. His match against Federer is considered one of the greatest non-grand slam matches ever, due to its high quality and contrast in styles and personalities.

Kyrgios then participated in Madrid, where he lost in straight sets in the third round to Nadal. At Roland Garros, Kyrgios lost to Kevin Anderson in the second round after winning the first set. He then withdrew from his first-round matches at Queen's Club, Wimbledon and Washington due to injuries. After his recent slump in form, Kyrgios then reached the third round of the National Bank Open, where he lost to Zverev in straight sets. In the Cincinnati Masters, Kyrgios made it to the quarterfinals, where he defeated world No. 2 Nadal in straight sets. He followed that up with a victory over Ferrer to reach his first Masters 1000 final, where he lost to Grigor Dimitrov in straight sets. At the China Open, he was crushed by Nadal in the final. Kyrgios's record against Nadal fell to 2–3 with this loss.

In the inaugural 2017 Laver Cup, Kyrgios competed for Team World, replacing Milos Raonic following his withdrawal from the tournament. In doubles, Kyrgios partnered with Jack Sock, defeating Tomas Berdych and Rafael Nadal and earning Team World's only point on Day 1. In singles, Kyrgios defeated Tomáš Berdych, earning Team World's only points on Day 2. Kyrgios went on to play a match tie-break with Roger Federer on Day 3, which would have forced a deciding doubles match. However, Federer defended the match point and went on to win: resulting in an overall victory for Team Europe (15–9).

=== 2018: First Australian title and French Open absence ===
In his first tournament of the season at the 2018 Brisbane International, Kyrgios won his first ever tournament on home soil. Kyrgios received a bye into the second round due to being the 3rd seed. In his first competitive match since the 2017 European Open, Kyrgios lost the first set to his compatriot Matthew Ebden in a tiebreak but found his form and won in three sets. He reached the final, defeating Ryan Harrison with 17 aces to win his first title since Tokyo 2016. The win returned him to the top 20, at no. 17. In the third round of the 2018 Australian Open, Kyrgios defeated Jo-Wilfried Tsonga in four sets. He was then beaten by Grigor Dimitrov in a tight four setter, with the latter winning three tiebreaks. Kyrgios served 36 aces in that match.

After the Australian Open, Alexander Zverev defeated Kyrgios in four sets at the Davis Cup. It was soon revealed that he was playing with an elbow injury. In light of this, he cancelled appearances at the Delray Beach Open and Indian Wells Masters tournament. He resumed his season at the Miami Open, defeating Dušan Lajović and Fabio Fognini in straight sets before falling to Zverev in straight sets. Kyrgios weathered a lackluster clay season and did not play at the French Open, citing the elbow injury that spoiled the first quarter of 2018.

His next tournament, the Stuttgart Open, saw him reach the semifinals, falling to eventual champion Federer. After Stuttgart, Kyrgios entered the Queen's Club Championships. He won his first-round match over former world No. 1 Murray. This was notable as it was Murray's return to the tour since Wimbledon 2017 and Kyrgios's first professional win over Murray after five prior attempts. He was defeated in the semifinals by Čilić in two tiebreaks. At Wimbledon, Kyrgios defeated Istomin and Haase but lost to Nishikori in straight sets in the third round. His campaign in the 2018 US Open generated controversy. In his second-round match, Kyrgios appeared to be given advice by umpire Mohammed Lahyani that seemed to turn the tide in his match against Pierre-Hugues Herbert, which he won. Kyrgios's US Open run ended in the next round with a loss to Federer, who saw him out in straight sets.

At the annual Laver Cup, Kyrgios was defeated by Federer in straight sets. He then won the doubles with Jack Sock against Grigor Dimitrov and David Goffin. His last event on the ATP tour was a wildcard draw at the Kremlin Cup. He defeated Andrey Rublev in three sets before withdrawing against his next opponent, Mirza Bašić, citing an elbow injury. He also revealed weeks later that he was seeing psychologists to improve his mental health.

=== 2019: Two titles, a default, and suspension ===
Kyrgios began 2019 at the Brisbane International, where, in a rematch of last year's final, he defeated Ryan Harrison in the round of 32. He subsequently lost to Jérémy Chardy. His middling performance in his home country culminated in a straight-sets opening round loss to Milos Raonic at the 2019 Australian Open. Kyrgios won the 2019 Mexican Open in Acapulco (his fifth title), after beating three top 10 players (Nadal, Isner and Zverev) and three-time Grand Slam champion Stan Wawrinka, en route. During his Miami Open campaign his victory over Dušan Lajović in the third round involved two successful underarm serves but was followed-up by a loss to Borna Ćorić in the round of 16.

In Rome, Kyrgios beat Daniil Medvedev but then lost his next match to Casper Ruud by default in the third set when he threw a chair on the court after swearing at a linesperson. At Wimbledon, Kyrgios defeated compatriot Jordan Thompson in a five-setter, but then lost to Nadal in four sets in the second round which was described as an entertaining encounter and a genuinely great match. Kyrgios won his sixth title in Washington beating two top 10 players en route. He overcame first seed Stefanos Tsitsipas in the semi-final in three sets, and third seed Daniil Medvedev in the final in straight sets. At the US Open, Kyrgios progressed to the third round where he lost to Andrey Rublev in straight sets. At the annual Laver Cup, Kyrgios was again defeated by Federer, this time in a closer three-set match with a deciding match tiebreak. He teamed up with Jack Sock once again for the doubles, which they won against Rafael Nadal and Stefanos Tsitsipas.

Following the incident at the 2019 Cincinnati Masters tournament, where Kyrgios was fined $113,000 for five separate incidents of unsportsmanlike conduct, the ATP conducted an investigation into his behaviour. The investigation ended on September 26, and he was issued a 16-week suspended ban, a $25,000 fine, and a six-month probationary period.

=== 2020: Longest career match ===
At the 2020 Australian Open, Kyrgios was seeded 23rd. In the first round, he beat Lorenzo Sonego in straight sets before defeating Gilles Simon in four sets in the second round. In the third round, he defeated Karen Khachanov in the longest match of both his career and the 2020 Australian Open, lasting 4 hours and 26 minutes. He then played Rafael Nadal in the fourth round, which he lost in four sets. Kyrgios played alongside Amanda Anisimova in the mixed doubles, where they ended up losing in the second round. At the 2020 Mexican Open, Kyrgios attempted to defend his 2019 title, but retired from his first round match against Ugo Humbert, due to a wrist injury. Kyrgios withdrew from the 2020 US Open, choosing to avoid taking health risks amid the COVID-19 pandemic. Kyrgios ended 2020 with a singles rank of No. 45.

=== 2021: Tournament withdrawals and knee injury ===
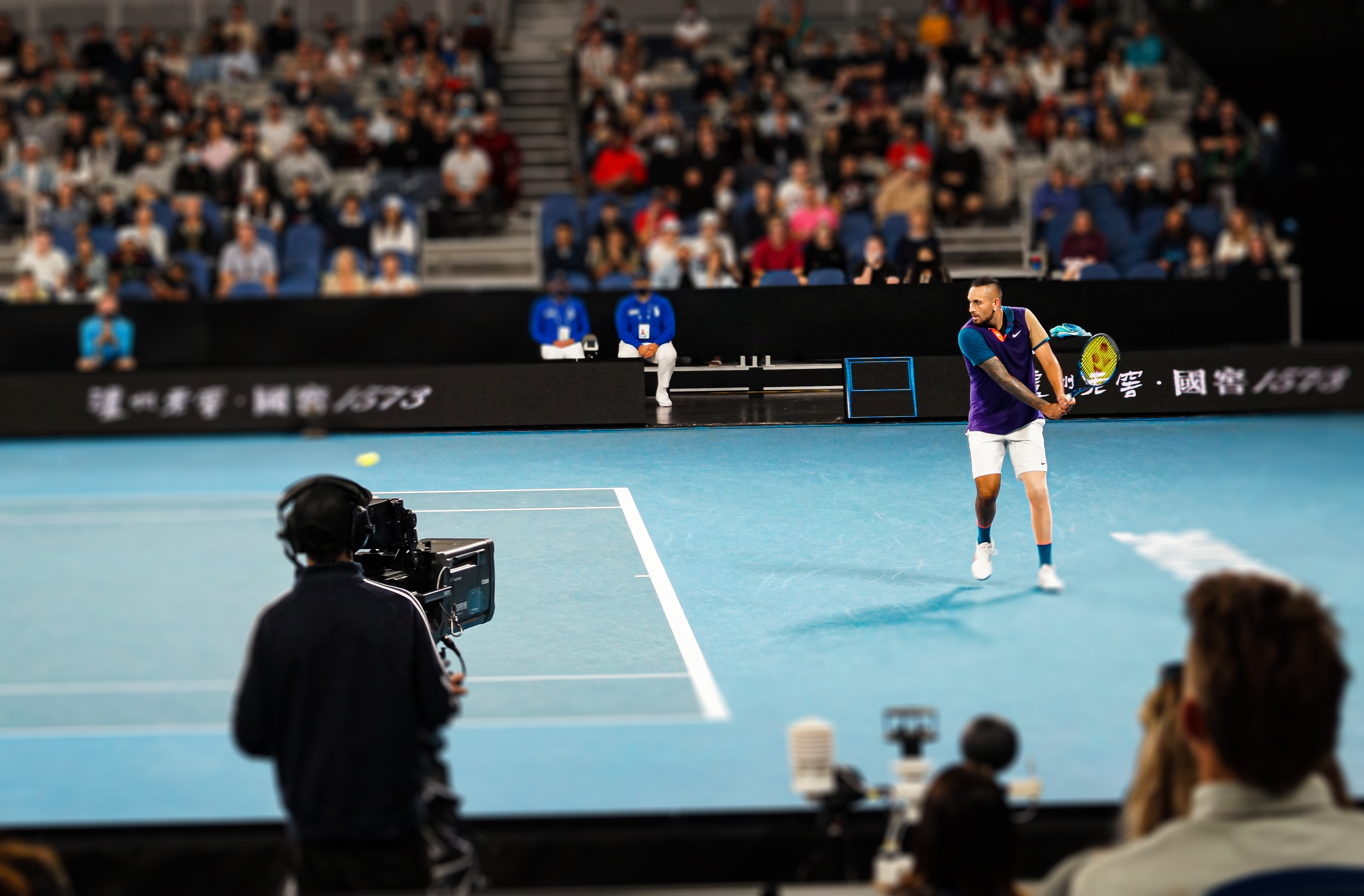
Kyrgios playing at the 2021 Australian Open

At the 2021 Australian Open, Kyrgios lost in the third round to Dominic Thiem despite leading by two sets to love. In April, Kyrgios announced he would play in the Mallorca Open. He followed this by also announcing that he would play in the Stuttgart Open, but withdrew from both tournaments. He entered Wimbledon to continue his return to competitive tennis, and won his opening match against 21st-seeded Ugo Humbert in a five-set match that stretched out over two days. In the second round Kyrgios beat Gianluca Mager in straight sets. In the third round against Félix Auger-Aliassime, with the match tied at one set each, he retired after the second set due to an abdominal injury.

Kyrgios failed to defend his title in Washington, losing in the first round to Mackenzie McDonald in straight sets. At the US Open, he lost in the first round to Roberto Bautista Agut in straight sets. Kyrgios then competed for Team World at the Laver Cup for the fourth consecutive year. He lost his singles match to Stefanos Tsitsipas and partnered with John Isner in doubles, where they lost to Tsitsipas and Andrey Rublev. After the conclusion of the Laver Cup, on 28 September 2021, Kyrgios announced he was ending his 2021 season due to a knee injury. He ended 2021 with a singles ranking of 93.

=== 2022: Wimbledon Final and return to top 20 ===
Kyrgios withdrew from Melbourne due to asthma. On January 10, he tested positive for COVID-19 and also had to withdraw from the Sydney Tennis Classic. As a result, he dropped to No. 114 on the ATP rankings, the first time he had been out of the top 100 since June 2014. At the 2022 Australian Open, he won his first round match in straight sets against qualifier Liam Broady. He was subsequently defeated in the second round by top seed Daniil Medvedev over four sets. In doubles, Kyrgios partnered with Thanasi Kokkinakis to defeat the world No. 1 doubles team, Nikola Mektić and Mate Pavić, en route to the quarter-finals. Following their success in the quarter-finals and semi-finals, this set up the first all-Australian doubles final (since 1980) against Matthew Ebden and Max Purcell. Kyrgios and Kokkinakis won in straight sets, becoming the first all-Australian men's doubles champions (at the Australian Open) since The Woodies in 1997. Moreover, Kyrgios and Kokkinakis are the first wildcard pairing in the Open era to win the Australian Open men's doubles title. As a result, Kyrgios moved to the top 40 in the doubles rankings on 31 January 2022, rising 219 spots.

Kyrgios next received a wildcard into the main draw at Indian Wells, California. He beat Sebastián Báez and Federico Delbonis, in straight sets, to get to the third round; where he then beat world No. 8 Casper Ruud. He received a walkover in the fourth round following the withdrawal of Jannik Sinner, but then lost in 3 sets to Rafael Nadal in the quarterfinals. He had less success in doubles, as he and Thanasi Kokkinakis lost in the second round to eventual champions John Isner and Jack Sock. In Miami, he advanced to the fourth round, but was beaten in straight sets by Jannik Sinner. In doubles, Kyrgios and Thanasi Kokkinakis finished up in the semifinals, again losing to the eventual champions Isner and Hubert Hurkacz. Kyrgios then reached the semifinals in Houston, his sole clay court event of the year, losing to Reilly Opelka in the semifinals. In Stuttgart, his first grass tournament of the year, Kyrgios reached the semi-finals where he lost to Andy Murray. In Halle, Kyrgios beat second seed and world No. 6 Stefanos Tsitsipas and sixth seed Pablo Carreno Busta on his way to his third tour-level semifinal of 2022, before losing to Hubert Hurkacz.

At the 2022 Wimbledon Championships, Kyrgios beat wildcard Paul Jubb in 5 sets, but was fined US$10,000 for verbally abusing a line judge and spitting in the direction of a spectator. He then went on to beat Filip Krajinović and Tsitsipas (for the second time during the grass season), to reach the fourth round. Following this, Kyrgios beat Brandon Nakashima in 5 sets to reach his first major quarterfinal since the 2015 Australian Open. He followed this with a shut out win over Cristian Garín and reached his first ever major semifinal. Kyrgios then reached his first major final after Rafael Nadal withdrew from the semifinals, becoming the first player in the Open Era to get a walkover into the Wimbledon final. Kyrgios lost the Wimbledon final to Novak Djokovic in a competitive 4-set match lasting over three hours. It was the first time Kyrgios lost to Djokovic in 3 career meetings, though they had not played each other since 2017.

In Atlanta, Kyrgios withdrew from the singles tournament, but went on to win his second doubles title with Thanasi Kokkinakis, defeating fellow Australians Jason Kubler and John Peers in straight sets. In Washington, Kyrgios won his first singles title in 3 years and his second Washington Open singles title –– defeating Marcos Giron, Tommy Paul, Reilly Opelka, Frances Tiafoe and Mikael Ymer en route to the final against Yoshihito Nishioka, where he won in straight sets. In the doubles, Kyrgios partnered with Jack Sock, where after receiving a walkover in the semifinals, they defeated Ivan Dodig and Austin Krajicek to win the Washington Open doubles title. As a result, Kyrgios became the first player to win both the singles and doubles titles at Washington in the same year in the tournament's history.

At the Canadian Open, Kyrgios defeated top seed Daniil Medvedev in the second round. Next he defeated his compatriot Alex de Minaur but eventually lost to Hubert Hurkacz in the quarterfinals. At the Cincinnati Masters, Kyrgios was defeated in the second round by Taylor Fritz in a match only lasting 51 minutes. At the US Open, Kyrgios defeated Thanasi Kokkinakis, Benjamin Bonzi and wildcard JJ Wolf to reach the fourth round at the US Open for the first time in his career. He then defeated world No.1 Daniil Medvedev in four sets to reach the quarterfinals at the event for the first time. With his win over Medvedev, Kyrgios became the first Australian player to beat the world No. 1 twice within the same year, since Pat Cash in 1987. In the quarterfinals, he faced off against Russian 27th seed Karen Khachanov, losing a closely fought match in five sets. Despite the loss, Kyrgios returned to the Top 20 for the first time since February 2020 and reclaimed the No.1 Australian position, overtaking Alex de Minaur.

In October, Kyrgios reached the quarterfinals of the Japan Open, but withdrew before his clash with Taylor Fritz, citing a knee problem as the cause for his exit. Kyrgios, along with doubles partner Thanasi Kokkinakis qualified for the 2022 ATP Finals in Turin after being guaranteed a spot under the Grand Slam champion provision. The pair failed to progress past the round robin stage of the event after recording a 1–2 win-loss record. Kyrgios ended the 2022 season ranked No. 22 in singles and No. 13 in doubles. This was Kyrgios's highest end-of-year doubles ranking of his career.

=== 2023–24: Australian Open withdrawal and injuries ===
Kyrgios was scheduled to participate and represent Australia in the inaugural United Cup to begin his season. However, he withdrew on the eve of the event following an ankle injury. Kyrgios subsequently withdrew from the Adelaide International 2 event the following week as a precaution in the lead up to the Australian Open. On 13 January, Kyrgios competed in a Fast4 exhibition match against Novak Djokovic at Rod Laver Arena. Kyrgios defeated Djokovic in three-sets in front of a sold-out crowd. Just days later, on the eve of the 2023 Australian Open, Kyrgios withdrew from the event due to a knee injury. He revealed a cyst caused by a tear in his lateral meniscus would require arthroscopic surgery, and that was done later the same month.

Withdrawing from several events, Kyrgios was expected to return during the French Open, but he had a foot injury during an armed robbery at his home. He next prepared for Wimbledon in June, but during a practice session, he tore a ligament in his wrist. He spent the rest of 2023 out due to injury, and he announced that he would return for the 2024 grass season. In 2024, Kyrgios said that his wrist injury required innovative surgery to reduce the pain and inevitable permanent arthritis, and he instead became a commentator for BBC and ESPN. The ANAFAB wrist surgery (full wrist reconstruction) that Kyrgios had performed in September 2023 was too serious to be fully ready for competition in 2024, although he did return for a UTS match in September 2024, which he won against Casper Ruud.

=== 2025: Return to the Tour and Battle of the Sexes ===
In November 2024, Nick Kyrgios announced his return to the tour, first at the World Tennis League event in Abu Dhabi in December 2024. This was followed by a headline appearance at the Brisbane International 2025 (where he was the 2018 champion). Kyrgios's first match as a wildcard was a doubles match with Novak Djokovic which they won in three close sets. It was intended to showcase the attraction of doubles as a crowd pleaser alongside the WTA 500 and ATP 250 also being played in Brisbane.

Kyrgios played Giovanni Mpetshi Perricard in his first round singles match at the Brisbane International. He lost in three tie-breakers, not once dropping his serve. Perricard served 36 aces in the match. Kyrgios's wrist injury needed attention during the match. Djokovic and Kyrgios lost their second round doubles match to the number one seeds, Mektic and Venus in a close match. In an interview after the match Kyrgios was cautious about his upcoming participation in singles at the Australian Open stating that although doing well, his wrist needed more recovery work. For the Australian Open in 2025, he had a protected ranking (PR) of 21. Although 21 is technically a seeded ranking, PR's do not play as seeds as they are returning from injury.

In the singles first round, Kyrgios was drawn against Jacob Fearnley, and was defeated in three sets. Despite Kyrgios calling the trainer to attend to a recent abdominal injury, he was unable to take it to a fourth set. In his subsequent media interview, Kyrgios said that he had 'probably played his last singles match at the Australian Open'. Alicia Molik, Will Boucek and other retired players have urged him to keep playing doubles. In the doubles first round, Kyrgios played with Thanasi Kokkinakis, who he had won the AO doubles with in 2022. Kokkinakis had suffered a serious shoulder injury in his singles match against Jack Draper, but elected to play for the last time before shoulder surgery, alongside Kyrgios. They retired halfway through the match against Aleksandr Vukic and James Duckworth.

In March 2025, Kyrgios returned to Indian Wells, entering the main draw with a protected ranking of 21. He was drawn against Dutchman Botic Van de Zandschulp. Kyrgios withdrew from a practice session after injuring his wrist but chose to play anyway. Despite a first set which went to a tie-breaker, Kyrgios withdrew due to wrist pain in the second set. In his post-match interview Kyrgios intended to continue trying to get back to a competent level. "I want to play. I want to play. I had glimpses of it tonight, with the crowd going absolutely ballistic, and I'm playing amazing and I'm enjoying being out there. The pain, it's just not great. I'll keep looking forward and try and do the right thing." Botic van de Zandschulp went on to beat Djokovic in the second round.

In Miami, Kyrgios beat Mackenzie McDonald, defeating the American in three sets. It was his first win on the tour in 896 days and brought his live ranking back to the mid-600s. He said the win gave him extra motivation moving forward but after such a major wrist reconstruction, attempting to fix the ruptured scapholunate ligament, he was not expecting to ever get back to his best. The second round match against twenty-second seed Karen Khachanov provided a first set ending in a tie-breaker which he lost. Kyrgios was bagelled in the second set, apparently hindered by both wrist and shoulder injuries. On X (formerly Twitter) Kyrgios wrote: 'Honestly today was a big stepping stone. Karen Khachanov was just too good. We played a great first set but encouraging that I could finish two matches this week! Plenty to work on. Thank you old friend and good luck for the rest of the tournament.' He indicated that he will continue training to get back to a tour level standard.

On 28 December 2025, Kyrgios (men's singles world No. 671) and Aryna Sabalenka (women's singles world No. 1) contested an exhibition match promoted as the "Battle of the Sexes" at the Coca-Cola Arena in Dubai. The event was organized by their shared management agency, Evolve. The match was played as a three-set contest under modified rules: the dimensions of Sabalenka's side of the court were reduced by 9%, and both players were restricted to a single serve per point. In the event of a tie, a 10-point match tiebreak would have been played. According to Evolve, the court-size adjustment was intended to "reflect average movement-speed differences between men and women". Kyrgios defeated Sabalenka in straight sets, 6–3, 6–3.

=== 2026: Continued limited schedule, provisional suspension ===
Kyrgios started his 2026 season in Australia. At the Brisbane International, in singles, as a wildcard, he lost to Aleksandar Kovacevic in straights. In doubles, partnered with long-term doubles partner Thanasi Kokkinakis, the wildcard pair won the first round against Rajeev Ram & Matthew Ebden in a match tiebreak. However, in the second round, they lost out to 6th seeds Sadio Doumbia & Fabien Reboul, again, in a match tiebreak.

At the Australian Open, Kyrgios withdrew from the men's singles, saying his body was "not ready to go the distance" in 5 set matches, instead choosing to focus on doubles with Kokkinakis. In the doubles, the wildcard pair lost in the first round to eventual runners-up Jason Kubler & Marc Polmans in a final set tiebreak. The contest lasted 2 hours and 47 minutes. Kyrgios also entered the Mixed Doubles with Leylah Fernandez. In the first round, they won a tight encounter against Neal Skupski & Desirae Krawczyk, saving 3 match points in the match tiebreak (winning 12-10). The wildcard pair then lost in the second round to JJ Tracy & Anna Danilina in straights. He also competed in the 1 Point Slam, where he lost in the third round to Joanna Garland, comically smashed his racquet, then gave it to a fan.

Kyrgios then received wildcard entry into both singles and doubles at the Stuttgart Open. In singles, in his first match on grass in 3 years, he defeated 8th seed Corentin Moutet in the first round in straight sets. He then lost out in the second round to qualifier Sho Shimabukuro in 3 sets, despite being 2 points away from victory in the second set tiebreak. In doubles, in his first doubles match on grass in 4 years, Kyrgios teamed up with Alexander Bublik, as he did in 2022. The pair won their first round against Jakub Paul and Ryan Seggerman in a match tiebreak. Kyrgios then withdrew from their second round match due to illness.

Kyrgios & Bublik then received a doubles wildcard into Wimbledon. In Kyrgios' first match at the tournament since he made the singles final in 2022, the pair lost out in straights to specialists Mate Pavić & Marcelo Arévalo the six seed in the tournament. Kyrgios then hinted at his retirement, stating that "It'd be hard to see my self coming back".

In August 2026, Kyrgios was provisionally suspended by the International Tennis Integrity Agency (ITIA) after testing positive for cocaine during the 2026 Mallorca Championships held in June 2026.

== National representation ==
=== ATP Cup ===
Kyrgios played in the inaugural ATP Cup in 2020 in Brisbane and in the Sydney finals. He won three straight singles matches against Jan-Lennard Struff of Germany, Stefanos Tsitsipas of Greece and Cameron Norrie of Great Britain respectively, as well as a doubles match alongside Alex de Minaur to defeat Great Britain in the quarter-finals. He eventually lost to Roberto Bautista Agut in the semi-finals against Spain in straight sets.

=== Davis Cup ===
Kyrgios has represented Australia eleven times at the Davis Cup in both singles and doubles on all surfaces. His win-loss record is 11–6 with most of his wins coming on hard courts. Kyrgios made his Davis Cup debut for Australia in September 2013 against Poland at the age of 18. He replaced Marinko Matosevic after defeating him in a playoff during the lead-up to the tie. He was selected to pair with Chris Guccione in the crucial doubles rubber. They lost to Mariusz Fyrstenberg and Marcin Matkowski in five sets. He then went on to win his first singles rubber, after Michał Przysiężny retired five games into the match. Australia won the tie 4–1. In 2014 Australia was drawn to play a very strong France and lost the tie 5–0. Kyrgios lost both his singles matches against Richard Gasquet and Gaël Monfils. Australia was relegated to the World Group Play-offs and were drawn against Uzbekistan in September. Australia beat Uzbekistan 5–0. Kyrgios won both his matches against Denis Istomin and Sanjar Faiyziez. Australia returned to the World Group.

In 2015 Kyrgios was selected to play in the quarter finals against Kazakhstan. He lost his singles match in 4 close sets, was injured and was then replaced by Sam Groth in the reverse singles rubber. Australia won the tie 3–2. He was dropped from the Davis Cup squad due to play their semi-final tie against Great Britain. Australia lost 2–3. He returned to the Davis Cup team in September 2016 for Australia's emphatic World Group playoff victory against Slovakia. Kyrgios won his singles tie in straight sets. In 2017 Australia was drawn to play the Czech Republic in the first round and won the tie 4–1. Kyrgios won his singles match in straight sets.

Kyrgios led the team to the quarter finals in May where they played in Brisbane against the USA. He beat both John Isner and Sam Querrrey in straight sets including four tie breakers and Australia won the tie 3–2. He led Australia into the semi-finals against Belgium which were played at home in Brussels with a vocal home crowd. He beat Steve Darcis in 5 sets but lost to captain David Goffin in four. Australia lost the semi-finals tie 3–2. In 2018, Australia was drawn to play Germany in the World Group first round. Kyrgios again led the team and beat Jan-Lennard Struff in three sets. Needing pain killers to continue the next day, he played Alexander Zverev but lost his match in straight sets. Australia lost the tie 3–1. That was the last year in which the Davis Cup was played in the old 'Home and Away' five set, three day setup. The finals went to Spain.

In 2019, Kyrgios was left out of the Davis Cup team for their qualifier in Adelaide, which they won against Bosnia and Herzegovina. He was re-added to the team later in the year for the Davis Cup Finals in Spain. In Spain, he won his singles rubbers against Colombia and Belgium to advance to the quarter-finals against Canada. He then withdrew from the quarter-finals due to a collar bone injury and was replaced by John Millman. Australia ended up losing the tie 1–2. Davis Cup was not held during the pandemic and Australia was eliminated in 2021. Kyrgios ended his season early due to a knee injury and was unavailable. During 2022 Kyrgios was not available due to overplaying and ankle injury. Australia reached the finals under Alex de Minaur but lost. Kyrgios was chosen for the 2023 United Cup but was unable to play because of an ankle injury. A few weeks later he had major surgery on his knee. Australia again got to the finals but lost in the 2023 Davis Cup versus Italy leaded by Jannik Sinner. In November 2024 Team Captain Lleyton Hewitt resumed discussions with Kyrgios about playing in Davis Cup and he hopes to be able to play again after full recovery.

== Playing style ==
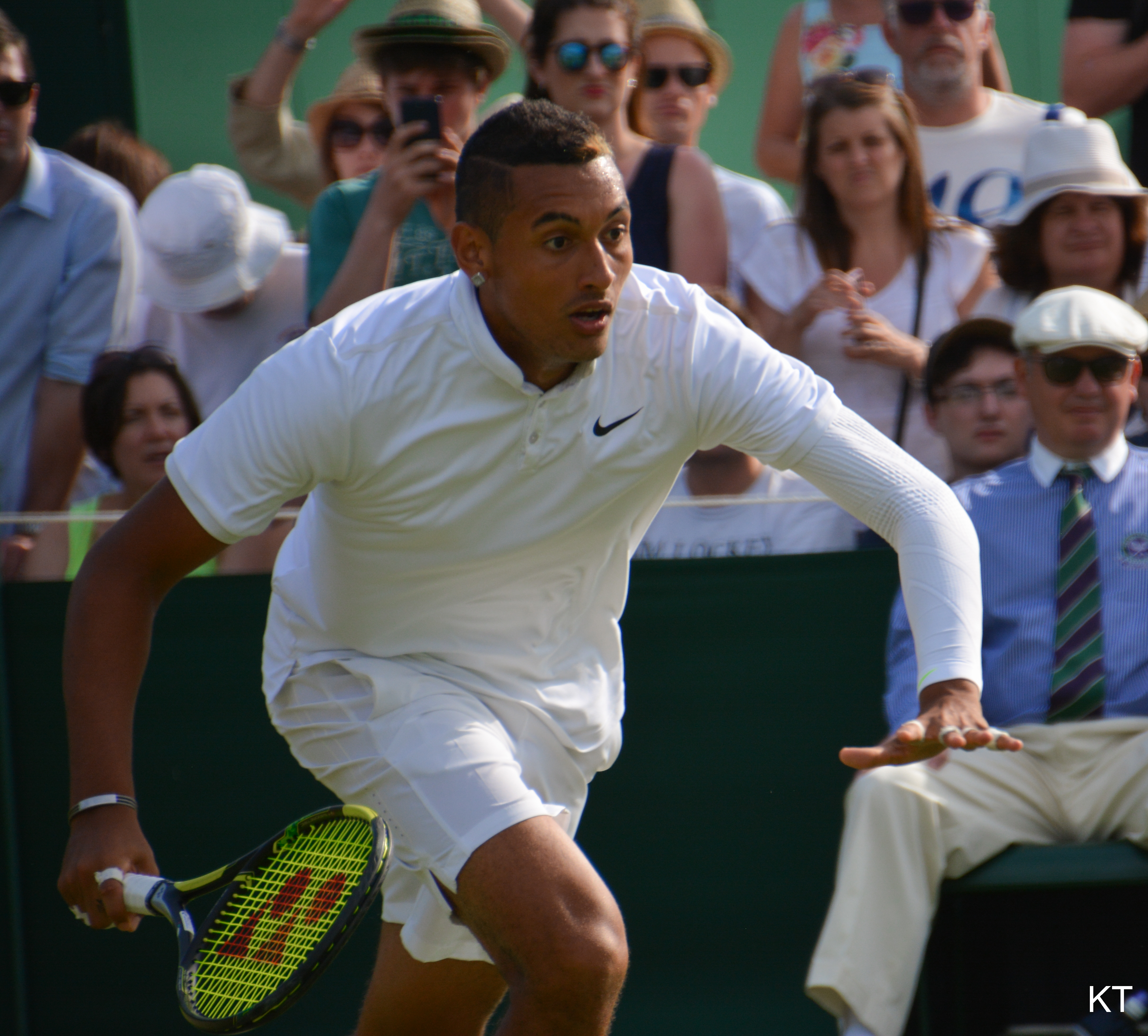
Kyrgios playing at the 2015 Wimbledon Championships

Kyrgios has been described as having an unusually aggressive game. While growing up, he was overweight, asthmatic, and has stated he "had to work out a way to be more aggressive than the average player". Former British no. 1 John Lloyd described watching Kyrgios as a "pleasure" because of "the mixture and the flair", adding that his character is one which attracts fans. The Guardian has described his playing style as "powerfully flamboyant, sometimes ridiculously brilliant game, which is something to behold".

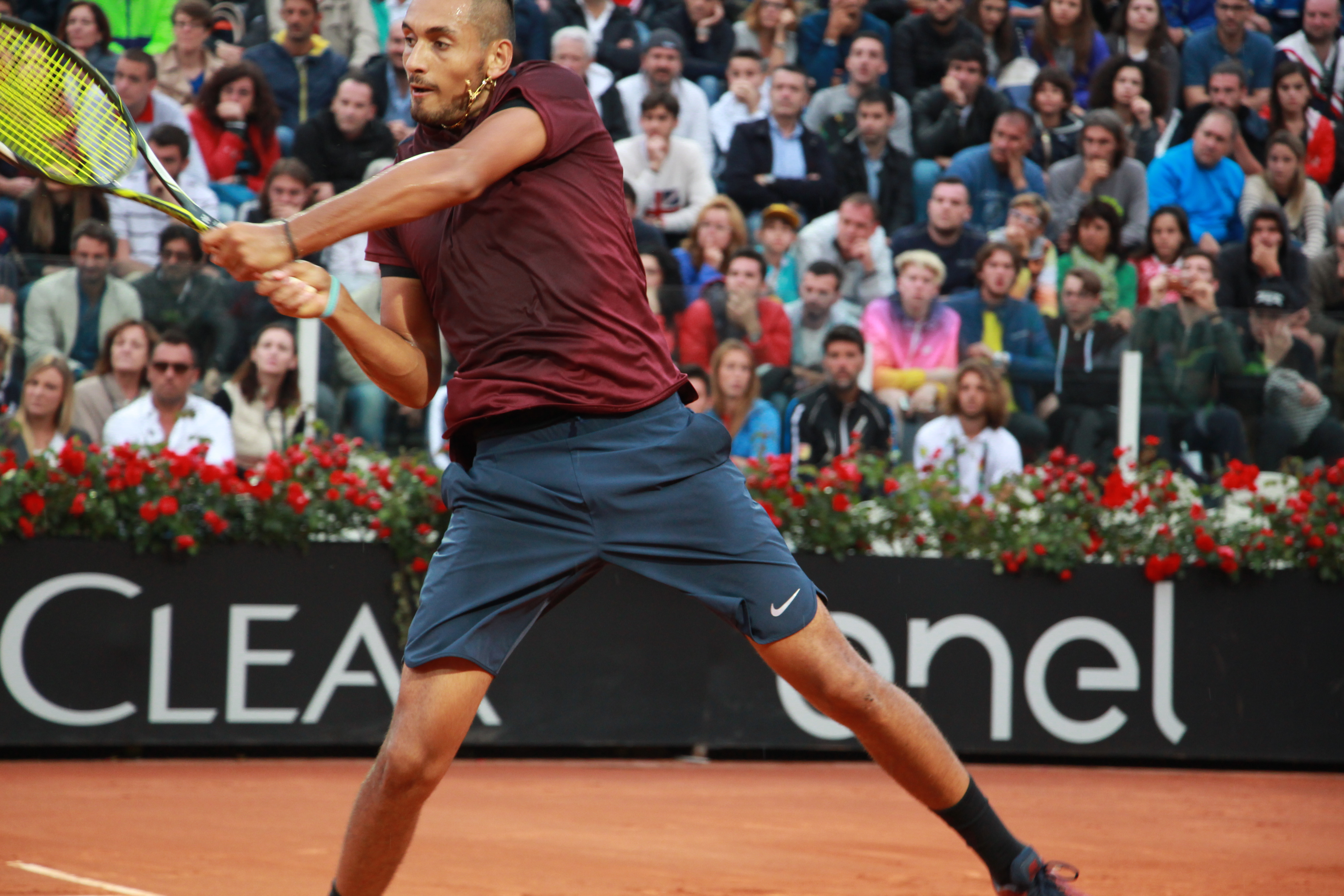
Kyrgios's two-handed backhand

Kyrgios has an effective forehand and two-handed backhand and is also able to mix up his shot selection using spin, slices and dropshots. While his game suits grass and hard courts, he reached his first ATP Tour final on clay in Estoril. In 2017, the ATP rated Kyrgios as the fifth best server in the history of professional tennis – with better results than current players such as Novak Djokovic and Roger Federer. He reaches speeds up to 230 km/h (140 mph) and wins 78.8% of his first-serve points. His second serve is also one of the best on the ATP Tour and often hit at above 200 km/h (120 mph). He sometimes tries for aces, on both his first and second serves. Goran Ivanišević has said "[Kyrgios] is a tennis genius. You can't prepare for Nick Kyrgios, he is the best server in the game by far. It's impossible to create tactics [against him]."

=== Underarm serve ===
Kyrgios first used the underarm serve at the 2019 Mexican Open in Acapulco during his match with Rafael Nadal. In a June 2022 press interview, following his first round victory at Wimbledon against British player Paul Jubb, Kyrgios cited his struggles of winning a point against Nadal in the match which led him to alter his serve, stating: "I'm playing Rafael Nadal for like three hours. I couldn't win a point. I threw in one underarm serve. Then, I don't know if there's a place in the game for that. Everyone does it now. It's like they're a genius." Nadal subsequently declared it was not within the spirit of the game, and accused Kyrgios of "lacking respect" for his opponent and the crowd. Kyrgios has been credited for reintroducing the underarm serve into the ATP Tour, and he has now used the underarm serve more frequently than any other player in professional tennis.

== Coaching history ==
Kyrgios has had a number of different coaches and mentors throughout his career. He tends to try one coach and then another, but prefers to do things his own way. In an interview with The New Yorker in 2017, he said: "Every coach I had tried to tame me, tried to make me play more disciplined, tried to make me do drills. I've just been kind of playing on instinct. I feel like it's been successful, so I don't know why there's a good reason to stop that."

In his junior and early professional career, Kyrgios was coached by former Australian professional tennis player and then-ACT national academy coach Todd Larkham, who was Kyrgios's first coach. Larkham had coached Kyrgios from age 10–17. In 2013 it was reported that he was coached by former Australian professional tennis player Des Tyson, and later New Zealand tennis coach Simon Rea who worked for Tennis Australia. Under Rea Kyrgios reached a Grand Slam Quarter-final (Wimbledon) for the first time in his career. In 2014 Kyrgios was re-united with former coach Todd Larkham alongside former Australian professional doubles player Joshua Eagle. Kyrgios's cited reasons to change coaches were to spend more time at his home in Canberra. In June 2015 Kyrgios parted with Larkham, less than a week before his appearance at Wimbledon. Two months later, in the lead-up to the US Open, Kyrgios brought in Lleyton Hewitt for temporary coaching and mentoring.

Kyrgios continued not having a coach for the remainder of 2015 and throughout 2016. In May 2017, almost two years without a coach, Kyrgios hired French former professional tennis player Sébastien Grosjean. Grosjean was allegedly hired on a part-time basis, and held the position until the end of the year. Since 2017 Kyrgios has been without a head coach, and in 2020 stated: "And, for me, I don't have a goal of winning grand slams. I just want to do it my way, have fun with it and just play. So to get a coach for me is just pointless. Because I don't want to waste their time almost. I just don't think a coach is ready – and I'm not going to put them through it too cause it would just be a nightmare. Where I'm at my career now, it's just too far gone, I think for a coach, 'cause I'm too set in my ways and I just don't like to listen to advice, to be honest." Throughout his career, Kyrgios has had offers by many former professional players, and coaches to coach him. Some include Jimmy Connors (2016), Pete Sampras (2016) and John McEnroe (2017, 2020).

== Broadcasting, film, and television ==
Kyrgios made his broadcasting debut as a guest commentator and analyst on Tennis Channel for the 2023 ATP Finals alongside Andy Roddick and Jim Courier. Kyrgios would later make his ESPN debut two months later when he commentated the 2024 Australian Open. Kyrgios appeared in the documentary Australia's Open, which covered the Australian Open's history and impact on tennis and Australian culture. It premiered at the 2023 Melbourne International Film Festival.

Kyrgios appeared in the tennis docuseries Break Point, which premiered on Netflix on January 13, 2023. Kyrgios is highlighted by the series in several episodes. In Episode One, Kyrgios and Thanasi Kokkinakis feature in their road to their grand slam doubles title. In Episode Six, two Australian players are featured. Kyrgios's struggles with suicidal thoughts and depression are revealed. In Episode Seven, the 2022 Wimbledon finalists are highlighted including Ons Jabeur and Nick Kyrgios. He praises his opponent Novak Djokovic.

On 1 December 2023, Kyrgios was a guest on the British talk show Piers Morgan Uncensored. The segment covered Kyrgios's mental health struggles and support from Andy Murray, conflicts with other Australian athletes, his return to tennis, his experience with racism, and his mother being held at gunpoint. In 2024, Kyrgios launched a celebrity-interview series named Good Trouble with Nick Kyrgios, sponsored by Naomi Osaka's company Hana Kuma. It consisted of 12 episodes, with guests including Mike Tyson, Jemele Hill, Frances Tiafoe and Novak Djokovic.

Also in 2024, Kyrgios became a commentator and analyst for the BBC at Wimbledon. His Wimbledon commentating debut was well received by broadcasters and other pundits. He called the Gentleman's final between Carlos Alcaraz and Novak Djokovic alongside commentators Andrew Castle and Tim Henman, and also provided pre-match on-court previews and post-match analysis with head of commentary, Claire Balding, and Tim Henman.

At the 2024 US Open, Nick Kyrgios worked as a reporter and co-commentator for ESPN. He called matches alongside Chris Fowler, Rennae Stubbs, Chris McKendry, John and Patrick McEnroe including the men's and women's final. Kyrgios conducted pre-match interviews during the tournament, speaking with players before they walked onto the court. When the 2025 Wimbledon commentary team was announced Nick Kyrgios was not included. However, he continued his celebrity interview series Good Trouble with Nick Kyrgios live at the New Wimbledon Theatre, and also joined the talkSPORT daily podcast with Simon Jordan throughout Wimbledon 2025 to discuss broad current issues in tennis. He hosted Wimbledon Unfiltered on talkSPORT which has 1.68 million subscribers, and called both the men's and women's finals on the new 'Watchalong Wimbledon' format for TNT Sports alongside Dan Evans And Coco VandeWeghe.

== Reputation ==
=== Early career ===
Kyrgios won his first challenger tour title at the age of 17. He was often described as someone with great dedication to the game, with those around him, such as his childhood coach, Andrew Bulley, saying he was a 'super competitor' who 'trained with a better intensity than the other kids', and his father, describing him as a 'perfectionist'. After defeating the 18 year old Kyrgios in the 2014 Davis Cup World Cup tie, top French player Richard Gasquet said, "He's got a great attitude and a wonderful personality. I think he will be a prominent player in the future".

Andrew Bulley believes the support of Kyrgios's close-knit family was a critical factor in his attitude and motivation at the time. He was close to his family and friends, but as he rose through the rankings, playing in tournaments all over the world meant that he was away from home for long periods. He said: "I was winning, losing, going through relationship problems, dealing with other problems and I was pushing (family) away because you feel like the world's against you. I'm going seven months a year abroad in a new place every week. That's why tennis is so hard in my opinion." According to his mother, Nill Kyrgios, this was a very hard time for her son as a result of the criticism and pressure he was under.

=== Current public perception ===
Kyrgios continues to be a polarising figure with the public and one who is highly criticised in the media. Since his return in December 2024 after experimental wrist surgery, the media are re-assessing his future based on a good performance at the Brisbane International. He is frequently invited to play exhibition and team tennis events such as Ultimate Tennis Showdown and World Tennis League despite having lower rankings than other players. He remains one of the most popular drawcards at live tennis events, with his matches filling the stadiums at the recent Brisbane International. His final matches on John Cain Arena in Melbourne were also sold out despite fans knowing that his injures would not allow him to provide the entertainment they expect from his matches.

Kyrgios produced some of the best performances of his career at Wimbledon in 2022. After losing to Djokovic in the final, Kyrgios said: "It's taken me 10 years – almost 10 years – in my career to finally get to the point of playing for a grand slam and coming up short, but my level is right there." When asked if this had made him hungry for more grand slam finals, he replied "no, it was exhausting!", provoking laughter among the crowd.

=== Opinions held by other tennis professionals ===
==== Players, coaches, and commentators ====
John Newcombe, former Australian world No. 1 in both singles and doubles, remarked that: "Nick is an exceptional talent and he doesn't beat to the same drum as everyone else – he's a real individual." Tim Henman, former British No.1 (1996, 1999–2005) stated that: "Kyrgios is a performer, an entertainer and will go out and play the tennis he is capable of. He can beat anyone because he is seriously talented. He is a bit different and speaks his mind." Paul Annacone, Roger Federer's former coach, has been quoted as saying: "I think Nick is the most talented player since Roger jumped on the scene". Novak Djokovic after beating Kyrgios in the 2022 Wimbledon final: "I really respect you a lot. I think you are a phenomenal tennis player and athlete, an amazing talent." Coco Gauff, during a press-conference at Flushing Meadows, praised Kyrgios for practicing with her at the Miami Open despite already having concluded a two-hour long practice with Frances Tiafoe, observing:

"I know there's things on the court that he does that people don't agree with. I probably don't agree with some things," Gauff said. "But it's just things like [hitting with a young kid] that stands out for me."

"It's just moments like that that people don't really see about him. So I think people paint him as a bad guy. I feel around the grounds, at least my experience of him, he's not."

"If he keeps it up, I think he can go far ... I always, always root for him, no matter who he's playing, to be honest."

Lee McKenzie, who conducts immediate post-match interviews with winning players in front of the crowd on Centre Court at Wimbledon, was quoted as saying: "He is fascinating. I did a lot of interviews with him at Wimbledon last year (in 2022). I was the first person on court. I stood back and actually Nick noticed this and he looked over from his chair and just sort of gave me a little nod and waved me on. That was perfect and I went on and we did a great interview. I just think he respected the fact that I had given him space and we just did this lovely interview.”

==== John McEnroe ====
John McEnroe has also praised Kyrgios's talent. In late 2018 on the Seven Network's Sunday Night show in Australia, McEnroe said that Kyrgios is "the most talented player [he's] seen in the last ten years" but that Kyrgios may "run himself out", if he continued not to commit himself to tennis. While hosting a radio call-in show during the 2021 Wimbledon Championships on BBC Radio 5 Live McEnroe stated that if he could choose any player on the current tour to coach he would pick Kyrgios.

=== Off the court ===
==== Persona outside professional tennis ====
Those who know Kyrgios personally say his off-court personality is very different from his on-court antics. Hugh van Cuylenburg, founder of the Resilience Project said:

"Everyone who has ever met him say he's a sensational person who cares deeply about other people. He doesn't seek recognition or publicity for the good things he does."

On a similar note, fellow Australian, Jason Kubler, said:

"Every time I see him, he's smiling. Every time I'm around him, it seems like I'm laughing. So it's kind of weird when I read or see the comments about him, knowing him the way I do. He's just one of those people if you were to hang around him or spend any sort of quality time with him, you'd fall in love with him."

==== Response to Australian bushfires ====
Kyrgios pledged to donate $200 for every ace he served during the summer, which was subsequently taken up by other Australian tennis players. Kyrgios also asked Tennis Australia to hold an exhibition match before the 2020 Australian Open to raise more funds. Numerous top tennis players participated including Caroline Wozniacki, Serena Williams, Coco Gauff, Alexander Zverev, Stefanos Tsitsipas, Naomi Osaka, Dominic Thiem, Petra Kvitova, Novak Djokovic, Rafael Nadal and Roger Federer. This brought the Aces for Bushfire Relief total to almost $5 million.

==== Criticism and support for Djokovic ====
In June 2020, Kyrgios publicly criticised Djokovic for organizing the controversial charity tennis tournament at which Djokovic and numerous other tennis players tested positive for COVID-19, calling it a "boneheaded decision". In January 2021, Kyrgios called Djokovic a "tool" after he issued a wish-list of requirements for players forced to quarantine when they arrive in the country to play in the Australian Open. A year later, when Djokovic was detained by the Australian government after entering the country unvaccinated, Kyrgios was the first and most notable player to speak up for his predicament, declaring: "He's a human, I just don't think how we're going about it is the right way and that's coming from someone who we've had run in and comments about each other, but it's not right." He also praised Djokovic for his generous response to the bush fire disasters. In June 2022, after Djokovic beat Kyrgios in the Wimbledon final, Kyrgios called Djokovic "a bit of a god" after which Djokovic jokingly declared his relationship with Nick Kyrgios "officially a bromance".

=== Controversial incidents ===
Kyrgios has been involved in a number of controversial incidents during tennis matches, mostly during his early career. During a match at the 2015 Rogers Cup, Kyrgios generated considerable controversy for insults he directed at Stan Wawrinka in the middle of the match. During play, Kyrgios's voice was picked up by the on-court microphone telling Wawrinka, "Kokkinakis banged your girlfriend; sorry to tell you that, mate," a lewd reference to fellow pro Thanasi Kokkinakis and Wawrinka's girlfriend at the time, WTA player Donna Vekic. After the match, Wawrinka said he found the comments "unacceptable" and urged action be taken against Kyrgios.

Kyrgios was fined $13,127 and given suspended penalties pending further breaches by the ATP. He later apologised to Wawrinka. At the 2019 Rome Masters, Kyrgios was defaulted from his second round encounter with Casper Ruud after swearing at a line judge, kicking a bottle, and hurling a chair onto court. The default followed the three warnings rule which Kyrgios accepted immediately and shook hands with the referee, supervisor and opponent. The referee and supervisor had tried many times to quell a heckling group without success. The 2023 clay season was extremely rowdy and measures trialled at Roland Garros 2023 are being put in place to protect players from physical and social media abuse.

=== Mental health issues ===
At age 19, ranked 144th in the world, he received a wildcard entry to play at Wimbledon and beat then-world No. 1 Nadal in the fourth round. Beating Nadal, the first time he played against him, brought international attention. From then on he was told: "you're the next big thing in tennis." Kyrgios admits he didn't know how to deal with the pressure. He told the Turn Up the Talk podcast in May 2022: "I kept trying, trying and trying, just ended up snowballing into this dark cloud." Things became so difficult for him that Kyrgios posted on Instagram that in 2018 he suffered from depression and engaged in self-harm and had suicidal ideation. In an interview on the Turn Up The Talk podcast, he explained that in 2019, even when he was winning tournaments: "[I was] probably drinking 20 to 30 drinks every night – you know, just in my room on my own – waking up [and] playing." Kyrgios said that "winning tournaments seemed to 'just mask all of it', which was the 'darkest thing ever'." Struggling to cope, he sought professional help and saw three or four different psychologists.

== Business enterprises and endorsements ==
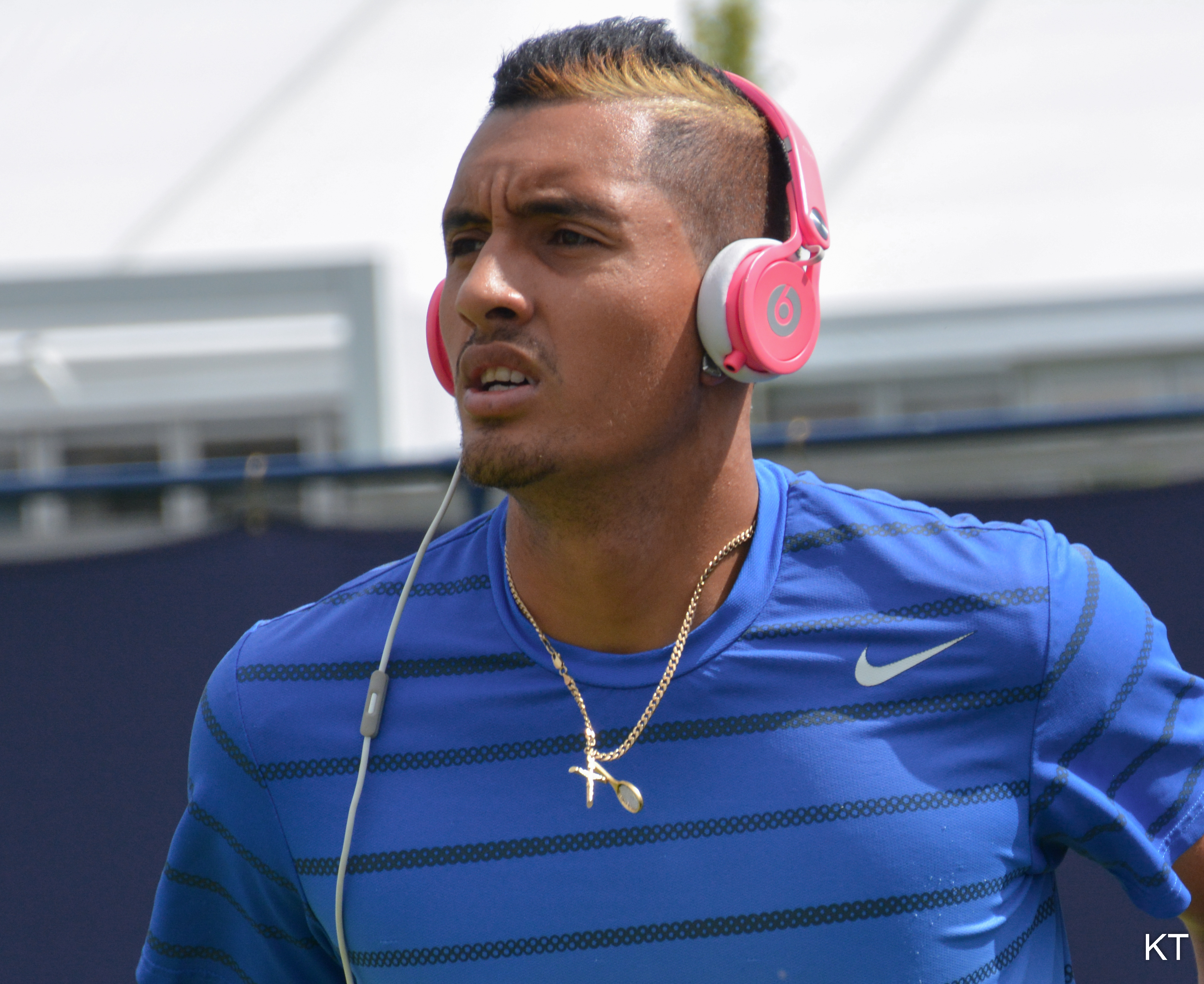
Kyrgios (wearing Nike and Beats apparel) at the 2015 Aegon Championships

Kyrgios is a co-owner of sports team Miami Pickleball Club. In January 2023, he joined the ownership group of South East Melbourne Phoenix of the Australian basketball competition, the NBL. In October 2024, Kyrgios became a co-owner and brand ambassador of Stryda Brewing Co., an Australian beer company.

Kyrgios has endorsement deals with several companies, including Yonex, Nike and Beats. Kyrgios and Stryda partnered with restaurant chain Zeus Street Greek in November 2025 to launch a Kyrgios-inspired pita and combo meal.

== Personal life ==
Kyrgios is an avid fan of the Boston Celtics in the National Basketball Association (NBA), and a life-long supporter of Tottenham Hotspur in English football's Premier League. Kyrgios also supports the Canberra Raiders in the National Rugby League (NRL) and North Melbourne in the Australian Football League (AFL).

Kyrgios is close friends with Thanasi Kokkinakis, who he has known since childhood and with whom he went on to win the 2022 Australian Open doubles. The pair also made decent runs in Miami, the US Open and 2022 ATP Finals. Kyrgios has followed a vegetarian diet since at least early 2020. He said that seeing the loss of animal life during the intense bushfires across Australia reinforced his choice of diet.

Kyrgios has spoken about his battle with mental health, including depression and self-harm.

=== Relationships ===
In December 2021, Kyrgios started dating Psychological Sciences graduate Costeen Hatzi, who owns and runs several businesses in interior and dress design. They separated in late March 2025 after nearly four years together.

==== Common assault case ====
In July 2020, Kyrgios entered into a relationship with Chiara Passari. They separated in October 2021. In 2022, it was announced that Kyrgios was summoned to appear in court, in Australia, to face a charge of common assault, for allegedly pushing Passari to the ground in January 2021. In 2023, Kyrgios pleaded guilty to the assault charge but ultimately the charge was dismissed, as Magistrate Beth Campbell stated that he had "acted poorly in the heat of the moment".

== Career statistics ==
=== Grand Slam tournament performance timelines ===
Key
| W | F | SF | QF | #R | RR | Q# | DNQ | A | NH |

(W) winner; (F) finalist; (SF) semifinalist; (QF) quarterfinalist; (#R) rounds 4, 3, 2, 1; (RR) round-robin stage; (Q#) qualification round; (DNQ) did not qualify; (A) absent; (NH) not held; (SR) strike rate (events won / competed); (W–L) win–loss record.
To avoid confusion and double counting, these charts are updated at the conclusion of a tournament or when the player's participation has ended.

==== Singles ====
Current through the 2025 Australian Open.

| Tournament | 2012 | 2013 | 2014 | 2015 | 2016 | 2017 | 2018 | 2019 | 2020 | 2021 | 2022 | 2023 | 2024 | 2025 | 2026 | SR | W–L | Win % |
|---|---|---|---|---|---|---|---|---|---|---|---|---|---|---|---|---|---|---|
| Australian Open | Q1 | Q1 | 2R | QF | 3R | 2R | 4R | 1R | 4R | 3R | 2R | A | A | 1R | A | 0 / 10 | 17–10 | 63% |
| French Open | A | 2R | 1R | 3R (Note: Kyrgios received walkovers in the second-round match of the 2015 French Open and in the 2022 Wimbledon semifinals, which do not count as a win.) | 3R | 2R | A | A | A | A | A | A | A | A | A | 0 / 5 | 5–5 | 50% |
| Wimbledon | A | A | QF | 4R | 4R | 1R | 3R | 2R | NH | 3R | F | A | A | A | A | 0 / 8 | 20–8 | 71% |
| US Open | A | 1R | 3R | 1R | 3R | 1R | 3R | 3R | A | 1R | QF | A | A | A | A | 0 / 9 | 12–9 | 57% |
| Win–loss | 0–0 | 1–2 | 7–4 | 8–4 | 9–4 | 2–4 | 7–3 | 3–3 | 3–1 | 4–3 | 10–3 | 0–0 | 0–0 | 0–1 | 0–0 | 0 / 32 | 54–32 | 63% |

==== Doubles ====
Current through the 2026 Wimbledon Championships.

| Tournament | 2012 | 2013 | 2014 | 2015 | 2016 | 2017 | 2018 | 2019 | 2020 | 2021 | 2022 | 2023 | 2024 | 2025 | 2026 | SR | W–L | Win % |
|---|---|---|---|---|---|---|---|---|---|---|---|---|---|---|---|---|---|---|
| Australian Open | A | 1R | A | 1R | 1R | A | 2R (Note: One withdrawal at the Australian Open (2018) and two at the US Open (2016, 2019), which do not count as losses.) | 1R | A | 2R | W | A | A | 1R | 1R | 1 / 9 | 8–7 | 53% |
| French Open | A | A | A | 1R | 1R | 3R | A | A | A | A | A | A | A | A | A | 0 / 3 | 2–3 | 40% |
| Wimbledon | A | A | A | A | A | A | A | A | NH | A | A | A | A | A | 1R | 0 / 1 | 0–1 | 0% |
| US Open | A | A | 1R | A | 3R | 2R | A | 2R | A | A | 3R | A | A | A | A | 0 / 5 | 6–3 | 67% |
| Win–loss | 0–0 | 0–1 | 0–1 | 0–2 | 2–2 | 3–2 | 1–0 | 1–1 | 0–0 | 1–1 | 8–1 | 0–0 | 0–0 | 0–1 | 0–2 | 1 / 18 | 16–14 | 53% |

=== Grand Slam tournament finals ===
==== Singles: 1 (1 runner-up) ====
| Result | Year | Tournament | Surface | Opponent | Score |
|---|---|---|---|---|---|
| Loss | 2022 | Wimbledon | Grass | (Serbia) Novak Djokovic | 6–4, 3–6, 4–6, 6–7^{(3–7)} |

==== Doubles: 1 (1 title) ====
| Result | Year | Tournament | Surface | Partner | Opponents | Score |
|---|---|---|---|---|---|---|
| Win | 2022 | Australian Open | Hard | (Australia) Thanasi Kokkinakis | (Australia) Matthew Ebden (Australia) Max Purcell | 7–5, 6–4 |
