= 2022 Citi Open – Women's singles =

Women's singles
- 2022 Citi Open

Final
- Champion: Liudmila Samsonova
- Runner-up: (Estonia) Kaia Kanepi
- Score: 4–6, 6–3, 6–3

Details
- Draw: 32
- Seeds: 8

Events
Singles	men	women
Doubles	men	women
- Citi Open

Liudmila Samsonova defeated Kaia Kanepi in the final, 4–6, 6–3, 6–3 to win the women's singles tennis title at the 2022 Washington Open. Kanepi was aiming to win her first title since 2013, and to be the oldest player to win a WTA Tour title since Serena Williams in 2020.

Jessica Pegula was the defending champion from when the event was last held in 2019, but lost in the second round to Daria Saville.

== Seeds ==
1. (United States) Jessica Pegula (second round)
2. (United Kingdom) Emma Raducanu (quarterfinals)
3. (Romania) Simona Halep (second round, retired)
4. Victoria Azarenka (quarterfinals)
5. (Belgium) Elise Mertens (first round)
6. (Estonia) Kaia Kanepi (final)
7. (Egypt) Mayar Sherif (first round)
8. (Denmark) Clara Tauson (first round)

== Draw ==
Key

- Q = Qualifier
- WC = Wild card
- LL = Lucky loser
- Alt = Alternate
- ITF = ITF entry
- PR = Protected ranking
- SR = Special ranking
- SE = Special exempt
- JE = Junior exempt
- JR = Junior Accelerator Programme entrant
- CO = College Accelerator Programme entrant
- NG = Next Gen Accelerator Program entrant
- w/o = Walkover
- r = Retired
- d = Defaulted

=== Finals ===
Semifinals
(Australia) Daria Saville	3	1
6	(Estonia) Kaia Kanepi	6	6
LL	(China) Wang Xiyu	1	1
Liudmila Samsonova	6	6

Final
6	(Estonia) Kaia Kanepi	6	3	3
Liudmila Samsonova	4	6	6

=== Top half ===
First round
1	(United States) J Pegula	6	6
WC	(United States) H Baptiste	2	2
(Australia) D Saville	3	7	7^{7}
Q	(Sweden) M Björklund	6	5	6^{4}
Q	(Canada) R Marino	4	6	6
WC	(United States) V Williams	6	1	4
(Germany) A Petkovic	6	6
8	(Denmark) C Tauson	2	2
3	(Romania) S Halep	6	7
Q	(Spain) C Bucșa	3	5
(United States) M Brengle	3	0
A Kalinskaya	6	6
(China) L Zhu	6	6
(United Kingdom) H Dart	4	3
(Belgium) G Minnen	3	3
6	(Estonia) K Kanepi	6	6

Second round
1	(United States) J Pegula	5	4
(Australia) D Saville	7	6
Q	(Canada) R Marino	6	3	6
(Germany) A Petkovic	3	6	1
3	(Romania) S Halep	5	0^{r}
A Kalinskaya	7	2
(China) L Zhu	6	4	4
6	(Estonia) K Kanepi	4	6	6

Quarterfinals
(Australia) D Saville	6	7
Q	(Canada) R Marino	1	5
A Kalinskaya	7^{7}	4	3
6	(Estonia) K Kanepi	6^{4}	6	6

Semifinals
(Australia) D Saville	3	1
6	(Estonia) K Kanepi	6	6

=== Bottom half ===
First round
7	(Egypt) M Sherif	4	1
(Croatia) D Vekić	6	6
LL	(China) Xiy Wang	6	7
(Germany) T Maria	2	5
(Czech Republic) T Martincová	0	6	6
(China) Xin Wang	6	4	4
(Ukraine) D Yastremska	4	0
4	V Azarenka	6	6
5	(Belgium) E Mertens	6^{4}	4
L Samsonova	7^{7}	6
(Australia) A Tomljanović	6	6
(United States) S Stephens	1	4
WC	(United States) S Kenin	6^{2}	1
(Colombia) C Osorio	7^{7}	6
Q	(United States) L Chirico	4	2
2	(United Kingdom) E Raducanu	6	6

Second round
(Croatia) D Vekić	6	5	1
LL	(China) Xiy Wang	4	7	6
(Czech Republic) T Martincová	6^{7}	2
4	V Azarenka	7^{9}	6
L Samsonova	4	6	6
(Australia) A Tomljanović	6	3	2
(Colombia) C Osorio	6^{5}	6^{4}
2	(United Kingdom) E Raducanu	7^{7}	7^{7}

Quarterfinals
LL	(China) Xiy Wang	6	6
4	V Azarenka	1	3
L Samsonova	7^{8}	6
2	(United Kingdom) E Raducanu	6^{6}	1

Semifinals
LL	(China) Xiy Wang	1	1
L Samsonova	6	6

== Qualifying ==
=== Seeds ===
1. (China) Wang Xiyu (qualifying competition, lucky loser)
2. (Canada) Rebecca Marino (qualified)
3. (United Kingdom) Heather Watson (qualifying competition)
4. (Spain) Cristina Bucșa (qualified)
5. (Sweden) Mirjam Björklund (qualified)
6. (China) Yuan Yue (first round)
7. (United States) Caty McNally (qualifying competition)
8. (United States) Sachia Vickery (qualifying competition)

=== Qualifiers ===
1. (United States) Louisa Chirico
2. (Canada) Rebecca Marino
3. (Sweden) Mirjam Björklund
4. (Spain) Cristina Bucșa

=== Lucky losers ===
1. (China) Wang Xiyu

=== Qualifying draw ===
==== First qualifier ====
First round
1	(China) Wang Xiyu	6	6
(United States) Jamie Loeb	4	1
(United States) Louisa Chirico	6	2	6
6	(China) Yuan Yue	4	6	2

Qualifying competition
1	(China) Wang Xiyu	1	6	5
(United States) Louisa Chirico	6	3	7

==== Second qualifier ====
First round
2	(Canada) Rebecca Marino	6	4	6
(Greece) Valentini Grammatikopoulou	0	6	2
(United States) Sophie Chang	6^{4}	1
8	(United States) Sachia Vickery	7^{7}	6

Qualifying competition
2	(Canada) Rebecca Marino	6^{5}	6	6
8	(United States) Sachia Vickery	7^{7}	3	3

==== Third qualifier ====
First round
3	(United Kingdom) Heather Watson	6	6
(Australia) Astra Sharma	4	2
WC	(United States) Christina McHale	3	3
5	(Sweden) Mirjam Björklund	6	6

Qualifying competition
3	(United Kingdom) Heather Watson	2	3
5	(Sweden) Mirjam Björklund	6	6

==== Fourth qualifier ====
First round
4	(Spain) Cristina Bucșa	6	3	7
PR	(Australia) Kimberly Birrell	3	6	5
PR	(China) Han Xinyun	5	1
7	(United States) Caty McNally	7	6

Qualifying competition
4	(Spain) Cristina Bucșa	1	6	7
7	(United States) Caty McNally	6	4	5
