= Nick Kyrgios career statistics =

Career finals
Discipline	Type	Won	Lost	Total	WR
Singles	Grand Slam	0	1	1	0.00
Singles	ATP Finals	–	–	–	–
Singles	ATP Masters 1000	0	1	1	0.00
Singles	Olympic Games	–	–	–	–
Singles	ATP Tour 500	4	1	5	0.80
Singles	ATP Tour 250	3	1	4	0.75
Singles	Total	7	4	11	0.64
Doubles	Grand Slam	1	0	1	1.00
Doubles	ATP Finals	–	–	–	–
Doubles	ATP Masters 1000	–	–	–	–
Doubles	Olympic Games	–	–	–	–
Doubles	ATP Tour 500	1	0	1	1.00
Doubles	ATP Tour 250	2	0	2	1.00
Doubles	Total	4	0	4	1.00
1) WR = Winning Rate

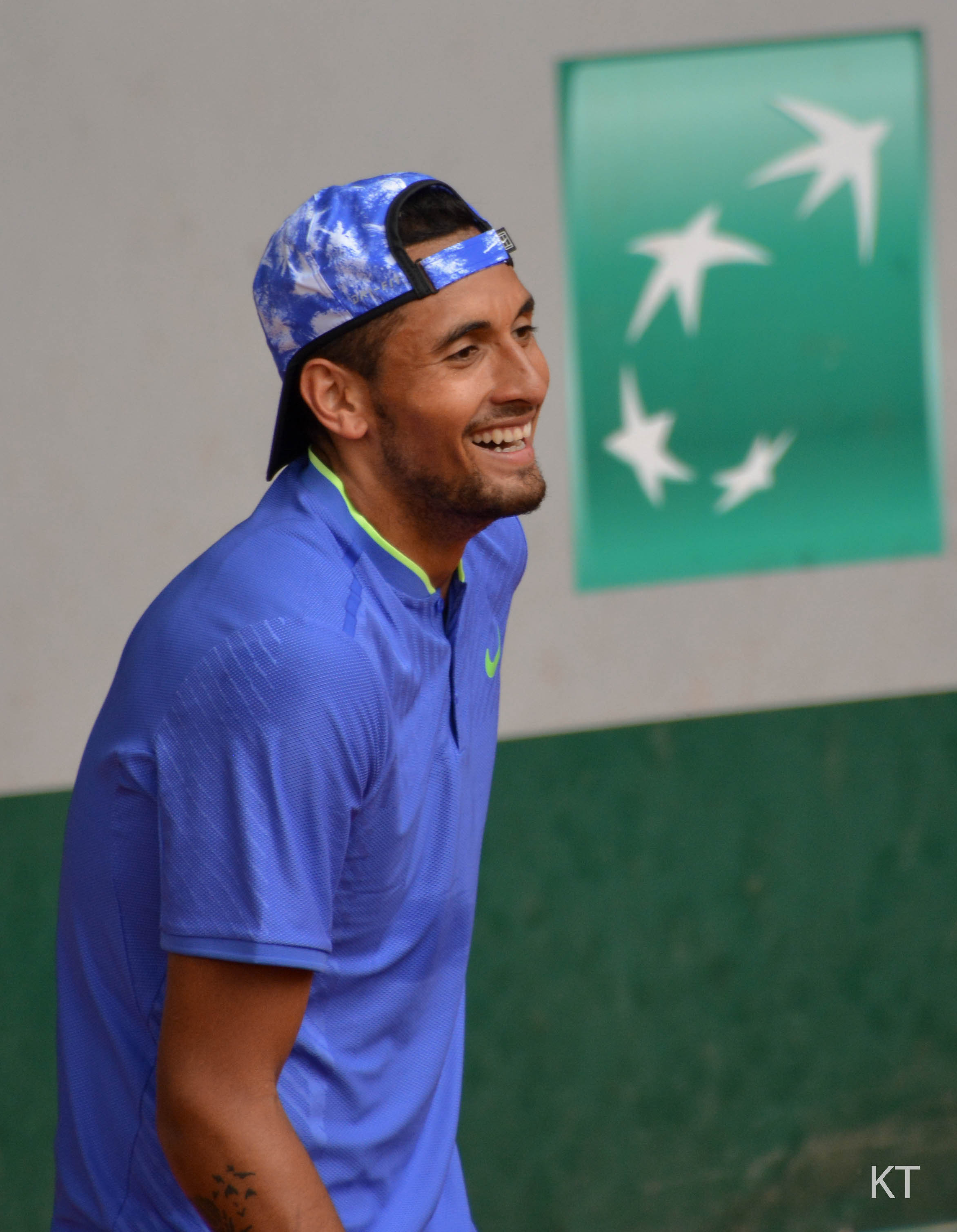
Nick Kyrgios in 2017

This is a list of the main career statistics of Australian professional tennis player Nick Kyrgios whose professional career started in 2013. To date, Kyrgios has won seven ATP singles titles and his highest attained singles ranking is No. 13 which he reached on 24 October 2016.

== Performance timelines ==
Key
W	F	SF	QF	#R	RR	Q#	P#	DNQ	A	Z#	PO	G	S	B	NMS	NTI	P	NH

(W) winner; (F) finalist; (SF) semifinalist; (QF) quarterfinalist; (#R) rounds 4, 3, 2, 1; (RR) round-robin stage; (Q#) qualification round; (P#) preliminary round; (DNQ) did not qualify; (A) absent; (Z#) Davis/Fed Cup Zonal Group (with number indication) or (PO) play-off; (G) gold, (S) silver or (B) bronze Olympic/Paralympic medal; (NMS) not a Masters tournament; (NTI) not a Tier I tournament; (P) postponed; (NH) not held; (SR) strike rate (events won / competed); (W–L) win–loss record.
To avoid confusion and double counting, these charts are updated at the conclusion of a tournament or when the player's participation has ended.

=== Singles ===
Current through the 2026 ATP Tour.

Tournament	2012	2013	2014	2015	2016	2017	2018	2019	2020	2021	2022	2023	2024	2025	2026	SR	W–L	Win%
Grand Slam tournaments
Australian Open	Q1	Q1	2R	QF	3R	2R	4R	1R	4R	3R	2R	A	A	1R	A	0 / 10	17–10	63%
French Open	A	2R	1R	3R	3R	2R	A	A	A	A	A	A	A	A	A	0 / 5	5–5	50%
Wimbledon	A	A	QF	4R	4R	1R	3R	2R	NH	3R	F	A	A	A	A	0 / 8	20–8	71%
US Open	A	1R	3R	1R	3R	1R	3R	3R	A	1R	QF	A	A	A	A	0 / 9	12–9	57%
Win–loss	0–0	1–2	7–4	8–4	9–4	2–4	7–3	3–3	3–1	4–3	10–3	0–0	0–0	0–1	0–0	0 / 32	54–32	63%
National representation
Summer Olympics	A	not held			A	not held				A	not held		A	not held		0 / 0	0–0	–
Davis Cup	A	PO	1R	SF	PO	SF	1R	QF	A	A	A	A	A	A	A	0 / 5	11–5	69%
ATP 1000 tournaments
Indian Wells Open	A	A	A	2R	2R	QF	A	2R	NH	A	QF	A	A	1R	A	0 / 6	7–5	58%
Miami Open	A	A	A	A	SF	SF	4R	4R	NH	A	4R	A	A	2R	A	0 / 6	16–6	75%
Monte-Carlo Masters	A	A	A	A	A	A	A	A	NH	A	A	A	A	A	A	0 / 0	0–0	–
Madrid Open	A	A	A	3R	QF	3R	A	1R	NH	A	A	A	A	A	A	0 / 4	7–4	64%
Italian Open	A	A	A	1R	3R	A	A	2R	A	A	A	A	A	A	A	0 / 3	3–3	50%
Canadian Open	A	A	2R	3R	1R	3R	1R	1R	NH	1R	QF	A	A	A	A	0 / 8	8–8	50%
Cincinnati Open	A	A	A	1R	2R	F	3R	2R	A	A	2R	A	A	A	A	0 / 6	10–6	63%
Shanghai Masters	A	A	A	2R	2R	1R	1R	A	NH			A	A	A	A	0 / 4	2–4	33%
Paris Masters	A	A	A	A	A	A	A	A	A	A	A	A	A	A	A	0 / 0	0–0	–
Win–loss	0–0	0–0	1–1	6–6	11–7	16–5	4–4	4–6	0–0	0–1	10–4	0–0	0–0	1–2	0–0	0 / 37	53–36	60%
Career statistics
	2012	2013	2014	2015	2016	2017	2018	2019	2020	2021	2022	2023	2024	2025	2026	Career		
Tournaments	0	2	7	18	18	17	14	16	2	7	13	1	0	4	3	Career total: 122		
Titles	0	0	0	0	3	0	1	2	0	0	1	0	0	0	0	Career total: 7		
Finals	0	0	0	1	3	2	1	2	0	0	2	0	0	0	0	Career total: 11		
Hard win–loss	0–0	0–1	4–5	13–10	26–9	28–12	17–10	20–10	6–3	5–7	23–6	0–0	0–0	1–4	0–1	7 / 82	143–78	65%
Clay win–loss	0–0	2–1	0–3	8–6	9–4	4–4	1–1	1–2	0–0	0–0	2–1	0–0	0–0	0–0	0–0	0 / 19	27–22	55%
Grass win–loss	0–0	0–0	6–1	3–3	4–2	0–2	7–3	2–3	0–0	2–1	12–3	0–1	0–0	0–0	1–2	0 / 21	37–21	64%
Overall win–loss	0–0	2–2	10–9	24–19	39–15	32–18	25–14	23–15	6–3	7–8	37–10	0–1	0–0	1–4	1–3	7 / 122	207–121	63%
Win %	–	50%	53%	56%	72%	64%	64%	61%	67%	47%	79%	0%	–	20%	25%	Career total: 63%		
Year-end ranking	838	182	52	30	13	21	35	30	45	93	22	–	–	671		$13,374,911		

Note: Kyrgios received a walkover in the second-round match of the 2015 French Open against Kyle Edmund and in the 2022 Wimbledon semifinals against Rafael Nadal, which do not count as a win.

=== Doubles ===
Current through the 2026 ATP Tour.

Tournament	2012	2013	2014	2015	2016	2017	2018	2019	2020	2021	2022	2023	2024	2025	2026	SR	W–L	Win%
Grand Slam tournaments
Australian Open	A	1R	A	1R	1R	A	2R	1R	A	2R	W	A	A	1R	1R	1 / 9	8–7	53%
French Open	A	A	A	1R	1R	3R	A	A	A	A	A	A	A	A	A	0 / 3	2–3	40%
Wimbledon	A	A	A	A	A	A	A	A	NH	A	A	A	A	A	1R	0 / 1	0–1	0%
US Open	A	A	1R	A	3R	2R	A	2R	A	A	3R	A	A	A	A	0 / 5	6–3	67%
Win–loss	0–0	0–1	0–1	0–2	2–2	3–2	1–0	1–1	0–0	1–1	8–1	0–0	0–0	0–1	0–2	1 / 18	16–14	53%
Year-end championship
ATP Finals	did not qualify										RR	did not qualify				0 / 1	1–2	33%
ATP 1000 tournaments
Indian Wells Open	A	A	A	A	A	QF	A	2R	NH	A	2R	A	A	A	A	0 / 3	3–3	50%
Miami Open	A	A	A	A	A	2R	1R	1R	NH	A	SF	A	A	A	A	0 / 4	3–4	43%
Monte-Carlo Masters	A	A	A	A	A	A	A	A	NH	A	A	A	A	A	A	0 / 0	0–0	–
Madrid Open	A	A	A	1R	A	SF	A	1R	NH	A	A	A	A	A	A	0 / 3	3–2	67%
Italian Open	A	A	A	SF	A	A	A	A	A	A	A	A	A	A	A	0 / 1	3–1	75%
Canadian Open	A	A	A	1R	2R	A	1R	A	NH	A	A	A	A	A	A	0 / 3	1–3	25%
Cincinnati Open	A	A	A	A	A	A	A	1R	A	A	2R	A	A	A	A	0 / 2	1–2	33%
Shanghai Masters	A	A	A	2R	A	2R	A	A	NH			A	A	A	A	0 / 2	2–1	67%
Paris Masters	A	A	A	A	A	A	A	A	A	A	A	A	A	A	A	0 / 0	0–0	–
Win–loss	0–0	0–0	0–0	4–4	1–1	6–2	0–2	1–4	0–0	0–0	4–3	0–0	0–0	0–0	0–0	0 / 18	16–16	50%
Career statistics
	2012	2013	2014	2015	2016	2017	2018	2019	2020	2021	2022	2023	2024	2025	2026	Career		
Tournaments	0	1	2	9	7	9	10	12	0	4	11	0	0	3	4	Career total: 72		
Titles	0	0	0	0	0	0	1	0	0	0	3	0	0	0	0	Career total: 4		
Finals	0	0	0	0	0	0	1	0	0	0	3	0	0	0	0	Career total: 4		
Overall win–loss	0–0	0–2	0–2	4–8	5–6	14–7	11–7	6–11	1–0	3–5	24–8	0–0	0–0	1–3	2–3	4 / 72	71–62	53%
Win %	–	0%	0%	33%	45%	67%	61%	35%	100%	38%	75%	–	–	25%	40%	Career total: 53%		
Year-end ranking	1222	483	1207	167	231	75	139	238	255	233	13	–	–	1282				

== Grand Slam finals ==
=== Singles: 1 (1 runner-up) ===
Result	Year	Tournament	Surface	Opponent	Score
Loss	2022	Wimbledon	Grass	(Serbia) Novak Djokovic	6–4, 3–6, 4–6, 6–7^{(3–7)}

=== Doubles: 1 (1 title) ===
Result	Year	Tournament	Surface	Partner	Opponent	Score
Win	2022	Australian Open	Hard	(Australia) Thanasi Kokkinakis	(Australia) Matthew Ebden (Australia) Max Purcell	7–5, 6–4

== Other significant finals ==
=== ATP 1000 ===
==== Singles: 1 (1 runner-up) ====
Result	Year	Tournament	Surface	Opponent	Score
Loss	2017	Cincinnati Masters	Hard	(Bulgaria) Grigor Dimitrov	3–6, 5–7

== ATP career finals ==
=== Singles: 11 (7 titles, 4 runner-ups) ===
Legend Grand Slam tournaments (0–1) ATP Finals (0–0) ATP 1000 (0–1) ATP 500 (4–1) ATP 250 (3–1)	Finals by surface Hard (7–2) Clay (0–1) Grass (0–1)	Finals by setting Outdoors (6–4) Indoors (1–0)

Result	W–L	Date	Tournament	Tier	Surface	Opponent	Score
Loss	0–1	May 2015	Estoril Open, Portugal	ATP 250	Clay	(France) Richard Gasquet	3–6, 2–6
Win	1–1	Feb 2016	Open 13, France	ATP 250	Hard (i)	(Croatia) Marin Čilić	6–2, 7–6^{(7–3)}
Win	2–1	Aug 2016	Atlanta Open, United States	ATP 250	Hard	(United States) John Isner	7–6^{(7–3)}, 7–6^{(7–4)}
Win	3–1	Oct 2016	Japan Open, Japan	ATP 500	Hard	(Belgium) David Goffin	4–6, 6–3, 7–5
Loss	3–2	Aug 2017	Cincinnati Open, United States	ATP 1000	Hard	(Bulgaria) Grigor Dimitrov	3–6, 5–7
Loss	3–3	Oct 2017	China Open, China	ATP 500	Hard	(Spain) Rafael Nadal	2–6, 1–6
Win	4–3	Jan 2018	Brisbane International, Australia	ATP 250	Hard	(United States) Ryan Harrison	6–4, 6–2
Win	5–3	Mar 2019	Mexican Open, Mexico	ATP 500	Hard	(Germany) Alexander Zverev	6–3, 6–4
Win	6–3	Aug 2019	Washington Open, United States	ATP 500	Hard	(Russia) Daniil Medvedev	7–6^{(8–6)}, 7–6^{(7–4)}
Loss	6–4	Jul 2022	Wimbledon, United Kingdom	Grand Slam	Grass	(Serbia) Novak Djokovic	6–4, 3–6, 4–6, 6–7^{(3–7)}
Win	7–4	Aug 2022	Washington Open, United States (2)	ATP 500	Hard	(Japan) Yoshihito Nishioka	6–4, 6–3

=== Doubles: 4 (4 titles) ===
Legend Grand Slam tournaments (1–0) ATP Finals (0–0) ATP 1000 (0–0) ATP 500 (1–0) ATP 250 (2–0)	Finals by surface Hard (3–0) Clay (1–0) Grass (0–0)	Finals by setting Outdoor (4–0) Indoor (0–0)

Result	W–L	Date	Tournament	Tier	Surface	Partner	Opponents	Score
Win	1–0	May 2018	Lyon Open, France	ATP 250	Clay	(United States) Jack Sock	(Czech Republic) Roman Jebavý (Netherlands) Matwé Middelkoop	7–5, 2–6, [11–9]
Win	2–0	Jan 2022	Australian Open, Australia	Grand Slam	Hard	(Australia) Thanasi Kokkinakis	(Australia) Matthew Ebden (Australia) Max Purcell	7–5, 6–4
Win	3–0	Jul 2022	Atlanta Open, United States	ATP 250	Hard	(Australia) Thanasi Kokkinakis	(Australia) Jason Kubler (Australia) John Peers	7–6^{(7–4)}, 7–5
Win	4–0	Aug 2022	Washington Open, United States	ATP 500	Hard	(United States) Jack Sock	(Croatia) Ivan Dodig (United States) Austin Krajicek	7–5, 6–4

== ATP Challengers and ITF Futures finals ==
=== Singles: 6 (5 titles, 1 runner-up) ===
Legend
ATP Challengers (4–0)
ITF Futures (1–1)

Result	W–L	Date	Tournament	Tier	Surface	Opponent	Score
Win	1–0	Mar 2013	Sydney International, Australia	Challenger	Hard	(Australia) Matt Reid	6–3, 6–2
Loss	0–1	Apr 2013	F2 Chengdu, China	Futures	Hard	(China) Wu Di	3–6, 3–6
Win	1–1	Apr 2013	F3 Yuxi, China	Futures	Hard	(Netherlands) Boy Westerhof	7–5, 6–1
Win	2–0	Apr 2014	Sarasota Open, United States	Challenger	Clay	(Serbia) Filip Krajinović	7–6^{(12–10)}, 6–4
Win	3–0	Apr 2014	Savannah Challenger, United States	Challenger	Clay	(United States) Jack Sock	2–6, 7–6^{(7–4)}, 6–4
Win	4–0	Jun 2014	Nottingham Challenger, United Kingdom	Challenger	Grass	(Australia) Samuel Groth	7–6^{(7–3)}, 7–6^{(9–7)}

=== Doubles: 2 (1 title, 1 runner-up) ===
Legend
ATP Challengers (0–1)
ITF Futures (1–0)

Result	W–L	Date	Tournament	Tier	Surface	Partner	Opponents	Score
Win	1–0	Feb 2013	F1 Melbourne, Australia	Futures	Hard	(Australia) Alex Bolt	(Australia) Ryan Agar (Austria) Sebastian Bader	7–6^{(8–6)}, 6–4
Loss	0–1	Mar 2013	Sydney International, Australia	Challenger	Hard	(Australia) Alex Bolt	(Australia) Brydan Klein (Australia) Dane Propoggia	4–6, 6–4, [9–11]

== Top 10 wins per season ==
- Kyrgios has a 27–41 (39.71%) record against players who were, at the time the match was played, ranked in the top 10.

Season	2013	2014	2015	2016	2017	2018	2019	2020	2021	2022	2023	2024	2025	2026	Total
Wins	0	1	3	6	4	1	5	1	0	6	0	0	0	0	27

#	Player	Rk	Event	Surface	Rd	Score	Rk	Ref
2014
1.	(Spain) Rafael Nadal	1	Wimbledon, United Kingdom	Grass	4R	7–6^{(7–5)}, 5–7, 7–6^{(7–5)}, 6–3	144	
2015
2.	(Switzerland) Roger Federer	2	Madrid Open, Spain	Clay	2R	6–7^{(2–7)}, 7–6^{(7–5)}, 7–6^{(14–12)}	35	
3.	(Canada) Milos Raonic	8	Wimbledon, United Kingdom	Grass	3R	5–7, 7–5, 7–6^{(7–3)}, 6–3	29	
4.	(Switzerland) Stan Wawrinka	5	Canadian Open, Canada	Hard	2R	6–7^{(8–10)}, 6–3, 4–0 ret.	41	
2016
5.	(France) Richard Gasquet	10	Open 13, France	Hard (i)	QF	6–0, 6–4	41	
6.	(Czech Republic) Tomáš Berdych	8	Open 13, France	Hard (i)	SF	6–4, 6–2	41	
7.	(Czech Republic) Tomáš Berdych	7	Dubai Open, United Arab Emirates	Hard	QF	6–4, 6–4	33	
8.	(Switzerland) Stan Wawrinka	4	Madrid Open, Spain	Clay	2R	7–6^{(9–7)}, 7–6^{(7–2)}	21	
9.	(Canada) Milos Raonic	10	Italian Open, Italy	Clay	2R	7–6^{(7–5)}, 6–3	20	
10.	(France) Gaël Monfils	8	Japan Open, Japan	Hard	SF	6–4, 6–4	15	
2017
11.	(Serbia) Novak Djokovic	2	Mexican Open, Mexico	Hard	QF	7–6^{(11–9)}, 7–5	17	
12.	(Serbia) Novak Djokovic	2	Indian Wells Open, United States	Hard	4R	6–4, 7–6^{(7–3)}	16	
13.	(Spain) Rafael Nadal	2	Cincinnati Open, United States	Hard	QF	6–2, 7–5	23	
14.	(Germany) Alexander Zverev	4	China Open, China	Hard	SF	6–3, 7–5	19	
2018
15.	(Bulgaria) Grigor Dimitrov	3	Brisbane International, Australia	Hard	SF	3–6, 6–1, 6–4	21	
2019
16.	(Spain) Rafael Nadal	2	Mexican Open, Mexico	Hard	2R	3–6, 7–6^{(7–2)}, 7–6^{(8–6)}	72	
17.	(United States) John Isner	9	Mexican Open, Mexico	Hard	SF	7–5, 5–7, 7–6^{(9–7)}	72	
18.	(Germany) Alexander Zverev	3	Mexican Open, Mexico	Hard	F	6–3, 6–4	72	
19.	(Greece) Stefanos Tsitsipas	6	Washington Open, United States	Hard	SF	6–4, 3–6, 7–6^{(9–7)}	52	
20.	(Russia) Daniil Medvedev	10	Washington Open, United States	Hard	F	7–6^{(8–6)}, 7–6^{(7–4)}	52	
2020
21.	(Greece) Stefanos Tsitsipas	6	ATP Cup, Australia	Hard	GS	7–6^{(9–7)}, 6–7^{(3–7)}, 7–6^{(7–5)}	29	
2022
22.	(Norway) Casper Ruud	8	Indian Wells Open, United States	Hard	3R	6–4, 6–4	132	
23.	Andrey Rublev	7	Miami Open, United States	Hard	2R	6–3, 6–0	102	
24.	(Greece) Stefanos Tsitsipas	6	Halle Open, Germany	Grass	2R	5–7, 6–2, 6–4	65	
25.	(Greece) Stefanos Tsitsipas	5	Wimbledon, United Kingdom	Grass	3R	6–7^{(2–7)}, 6–4, 6–3, 7–6^{(9–7)}	40	
26.	Daniil Medvedev	1	Canadian Open, Canada	Hard	2R	6–7^{(2–7)}, 6–4, 6–2	37	
27.	Daniil Medvedev	1	US Open, United States	Hard	4R	7–6^{(13–11)}, 3–6, 6–3, 6–2	25	

* As of 4 September 2022

== National and international representation ==
=== Team competitions finals: 5 (1 title, 4 runner-ups) ===
Finals by tournaments Laver Cup (0–4) Hopman Cup (1–0)	Finals by teams Australia (1–0) World (0–4)

Result	Year	Tournament	Team	Partner(s)	Opponent team	Opponent players	Score
Win	2016	Hopman Cup	Australia	Daria Gavrilova	Ukraine	Elina Svitolina; Alexandr Dolgopolov	2–0
Loss	2017	Laver Cup	Team World	Sam Querrey; John Isner; Jack Sock; Denis Shapovalov; Frances Tiafoe	Team Europe	Rafael Nadal; Roger Federer; Alexander Zverev; Marin Čilić; Dominic Thiem; Tomáš Berdych	9–15
Loss	2018	Laver Cup	Team World	Kevin Anderson; John Isner; Diego Schwartzman; Jack Sock; Frances Tiafoe	Team Europe	Roger Federer; Novak Djokovic; Alexander Zverev; Grigor Dimitrov; David Goffin; Kyle Edmund	8–13
Loss	2019	Laver Cup	Team World	John Isner; Milos Raonic; Taylor Fritz; Denis Shapovalov; Jack Sock	Team Europe	Rafael Nadal; Roger Federer; Dominic Thiem; Alexander Zverev; Stefanos Tsitsipas; Fabio Fognini	11–13
Loss	2021	Laver Cup	Team World	Félix Auger-Aliassime; Denis Shapovalov; Diego Schwartzman; Reilly Opelka; John Isner	Team Europe	Daniil Medvedev; Stefanos Tsitsipas; Alexander Zverev; Andrey Rublev; Matteo Berrettini; Casper Ruud	1–14

=== Davis Cup (11–6) ===
Group membership Finals / World Group (7–5) Qualifying rounds / Play-offs (4–1)	Matches by type Singles (11–5) Doubles (0–1)	Matches by surface Hard (6–1) Clay (2–4) Grass (3–1)	Matches by setting Indoors (4–4) Outdoors (7–2)	Matches by venue Australia (7–2) Away (2–4) Neutral (2–0)

Date	Venue	Surface	Rd	Opponent nation	Score	Match	Opponent player(s)	W/L	Rubber score
2013
Sep 2013	Warsaw	Clay (i)	PO	Poland	4–1	Doubles (w/ Chris Guccione)	Mariusz Fyrstenberg / Marcin Matkowski	Loss	7–5, 4–6, 2–6, 7–6^{(7–5)}, 4–6
Sep 2013	Warsaw	Clay (i)	PO	Poland	4–1	Singles 5 (dead)	Michal Przysiezny	Win	4–1 ret.
2014
Feb 2014	La Roche-sur-Yon	Clay (i)	1R	France	0–5	Singles 1	Richard Gasquet	Loss	6–7^{(3–7)}, 2–6, 2–6
Feb 2014	La Roche-sur-Yon	Clay (i)	1R	France	0–5	Singles 5 (dead)	Gaël Monfils	Loss	6–7^{(5–7)}, 4–6
Sep 2014	Perth	Grass	PO	Uzbekistan	5–0	Singles 1	Denis Istomin	Win	6–4, 7–5, 6–4
Sep 2014	Perth	Grass	PO	Uzbekistan	5–0	Singles 5 (dead)	Sanjar Fayziev	Win	6–1, 6–1
2015
Jul 2015	Darwin	Grass	QF	Kazakhstan	3–2	Singles 2	Aleksandr Nedovyesov	Loss	6–7^{(5–7)}, 7–6^{(7–2)}, 6–7^{(5–7)}, 4–6
2016
Sep 2016	Sydney	Grass	PO	Slovakia	3–0	Singles 1	Andrej Martin	Win	6–3, 6–2, 6–4
2017
Feb 2017	Melbourne	Hard	1R	Czech Republic	4–1	Singles 2	Jan Šátral	Win	6–2, 6–3, 6–2
Apr 2017	Brisbane	Hard	QF	United States	3–2	Singles 2	John Isner	Win	7–5, 7–6^{(7–5)}, 7–6^{(7–5)}
Apr 2017	Brisbane	Hard	QF	United States	3–2	Singles 4	Sam Querrey	Win	7–6^{(7–4)}, 6–3, 6–4
Sep 2017	Brussels	Clay (i)	SF	Belgium	2–3	Singles 2	Steve Darcis	Win	6–3, 3–6, 6–7^{(5–7)}, 6–1, 6–2
Sep 2017	Brussels	Clay (i)	SF	Belgium	2–3	Singles 4	David Goffin	Loss	7–6^{(7–4)}, 4–6, 4–6, 4–6
2018
Feb 2018	Brisbane	Hard	1R	Germany	1–3	Singles 2	Jan-Lennard Struff	Win	6–4, 6–4, 6–4
Feb 2018	Brisbane	Hard	1R	Germany	1–3	Singles 4	Alexander Zverev	Loss	2–6, 6–7^{(3–7)}, 2–6
2019
Nov 2019	Madrid	Hard (i)	RR	Colombia	3–0	Singles 1	Alejandro González	Win	6–4, 6–4
Nov 2019	Madrid	Hard (i)	RR	Belgium	2–1	Singles 1	Steve Darcis	Win	6–2, 7–6^{(11–9)}

=== ATP Cup (4–1) ===
Matches by type
Singles (3–1)
Doubles (1–0)

Venue	Surface	Rd	Opponent nation	Score	Match	Opponent player(s)	W/L	Match score
2020
Brisbane	Hard	RR	Germany	3–0	Singles	Jan-Lennard Struff	Win	6–4, 7–6^{(7–4)}
Brisbane	Hard	RR	Greece	3–0	Singles	Stefanos Tsitsipas	Win	7–6^{(9–7)}, 6–7^{(3–7)}, 7–6^{(7–5)}
Sydney	Hard	QF	Great Britain	2–1	Singles	Cameron Norrie	Win	6–2, 6–2
Sydney	Hard	QF	Great Britain	2–1	Doubles (w/ A de Minaur)	J Murray / J Salisbury	Win	3–6, 6–3, [18–16]
Sydney	Hard	SF	Spain	0–3	Singles	Roberto Bautista Agut	Loss	1–6, 4–6

=== Hopman Cup finals (1–0) ===
Matches by type
Singles (1–0)
Mixed doubles (0–0)

Venue	Surface	Rd	Opponent nation	Score	Match type	Opponent player(s)	W/L	Match score
2016
Perth	Hard	F	Ukraine	2–0	Singles	Alexandr Dolgopolov	Win	6–3, 6–4

=== Laver Cup (4–5) ===
Matches by type Singles (1–4) Doubles (3–1)	Matches by points Day 1, 1 point (1–0) Day 2, 2 points (2–5) Day 3, 3 points (1–0)	Matches by venue World (1–3) Europe (3–2)

Venue	Score	Day	Match type	Opponent player(s)	W/L	Match score
2017
Prague, Czech Republic	9–15	1 (1 point)	Doubles (w/ (United States) J Sock)	(Czech Republic) T Berdych / (Spain) R Nadal	Win	6–3, 6–7^{(7–9)}, [10–7]
Prague, Czech Republic	9–15	2 (2 points)	Singles	(Czech Republic) Tomáš Berdych	Win	4–6, 7–6^{(7–4)}, [10–6]
Prague, Czech Republic	9–15	3 (3 points)	Singles	(Switzerland) Roger Federer	Loss	6–4, 6–7^{(6–8)}, [9–11]
2018
Chicago, United States	8–13	2 (2 points)	Singles	(Switzerland) Roger Federer	Loss	3–6, 2–6
Chicago, United States	8–13	2 (2 points)	Doubles (w/ (United States) J Sock)	(Bulgaria) G Dimitrov / (Belgium) D Goffin	Win	6–3, 6–4
2019
Geneva, Switzerland	11–13	2 (2 points)	Singles	(Switzerland) Roger Federer	Loss	7–6^{(7–5)}, 5–7, [7–10]
Geneva, Switzerland	11–13	2 (2 points)	Doubles (w/ (United States) J Sock)	(Spain) R Nadal / (Greece) S Tsitsipas	Win	6–4, 3–6, [10–6]
2021
Boston, United States	1–14	2 (2 points)	Singles	(Greece) Stefanos Tsitsipas	Loss	3–6, 4–6
Boston, United States	1–14	2 (2 points)	Doubles (w/ (United States) J Isner)	(Russia) A Rublev / (Greece) S Tsitsipas	Loss	7–6^{(10–8)}, 3–6, [4–10]

== Team Tennis Leagues ==
=== League finals: 2 (2 championships) ===
Finals by leagues World TeamTennis (WTT) (0–0) International Premier Tennis League (IPTL) (2–0)	Finals by club teams DBS Singapore Slammers (2–0)	League table results 1st place (0) 2nd place (2) 3rd place (1) 4th place (1)

Place	Date	League	Locations	Surfaces	Team	Teammates	Opponent teams
4th	Dec 2014	International Premier; Tennis League (IPTL)	Philippines, UAE, India, Singapore	Hard (i), Hard	Singapore Slammers	(United States) Andre Agassi (Czech Republic) Tomáš Berdych (Australia) Lleyton Hewitt (Australia) Patrick Rafter (Brazil) Bruno Soares (United States) Serena Williams (Slovakia) Daniela Hantuchová	(India) Indian Aces: Champions (1st) (United Arab Emirates) UAE Royals: Runners-up (2nd) (Philippines) Manila Mavericks: 3rd
Champions (2nd)	Dec 2015	International Premier; Tennis League (IPTL)	Philippines, UAE, India, Singapore, Japan	Hard (i), Hard	Singapore Slammers	(United Kingdom) Andy Murray (Switzerland) Stan Wawrinka (Spain) Carlos Moyá (Brazil) Marcelo Melo (Germany) Dustin Brown (Switzerland) Belinda Bencic (Czech Republic) Karolína Plíšková	(India) Indian Aces: Runners-up (1st) (United Arab Emirates) UAE Royals: 3rd (Philippines) Philippine Mavericks: 4th Japan Warriors: 5th
3rd	Jul–Aug 2016	World TeamTennis (WTT)	United States	Hard (i), Hard	(United States) Washington Kastles	(United States) Murphy Jensen (HC) (United States) Bob Bryan (F) (United States) Mike Bryan (F) (Switzerland) Martina Hingis (F) (United States) Mardy Fish (F) (United States) Sam Querrey (R) (India) Leander Paes (R) (United States) Madison Brengle (R) (Australia) Anastasia Rodionova (R)	(United States); San Diego Aviators: Champions (1st); Orange County Breakers: Runners-up (2nd); Philadelphia Freedoms: 4th Springfield Lasers: 5th New York Empire: 6th
Champions (2nd)	Dec 2016	International Premier; Tennis League (IPTL)	UAE, India, Singapore, Japan	Hard (i), Hard	Singapore Slammers	(Cyprus) Marcos Baghdatis (Brazil) Marcelo Melo (Spain) Carlos Moyá (Germany) Rainer Schüttler (Netherlands) Kiki Bertens	(India) Indian Aces: Runners-up (1st); Japan Warriors: 3rd (United Arab Emirates) UAE Royals: 4th

*(HC): Head Coach, (F): Franchise Player, (W): Wildcard Player, (R): Roster Player, (S): Substitute Player

== See also ==
- Australia Davis Cup team
- List of Australia Davis Cup team representatives
- List of Grand Slam men's doubles champions
- Fastest recorded tennis serves
