= 2016 BB&T Atlanta Open =

- Date: August 1–7
- Edition: 29th
- Category: ATP World Tour 250
- Draw: 28S / 16D
- Prize money: $618,030
- Surface: Hard / outdoor
- Location: Atlanta, United States
- Venue: Atlantic Station

Champions

Singles
- (Australia) Nick Kyrgios

Doubles
- (Argentina) Andrés Molteni / (Argentina) Horacio Zeballos
← 2015 ·	Atlanta Open	· 2017 →

The 2016 BB&T Atlanta Open was a professional men's tennis tournament played on hard courts. It was the 29th edition of the tournament, and part of the 2016 ATP World Tour and the 2016 US Open Series. It took place at Atlantic Station in Atlanta, United States between August 1 and August 7, 2016. It was the second men's event of the 2016 US Open Series. Second-seeded Nick Kyrgios won the singles title.

== Finals ==
=== Singles ===
- (Australia) Nick Kyrgios defeated (United States) John Isner, 7–6^{(7–3)}, 7–6^{(7–4)}
- It was Kyrgios' 2nd and last singles title of the year and the 2nd of his career.

=== Doubles ===
- (Argentina) Andrés Molteni / (Argentina) Horacio Zeballos defeated (Sweden) Johan Brunström / (Sweden) Andreas Siljeström, 7–6^{(7–2)}, 6–4

== Singles main-draw entrants ==
=== Seeds ===
Country	Player	Rank^{1}	Seed
USA	John Isner	16	1
AUS	Nick Kyrgios	19	2
RSA	Kevin Anderson	34	3
UKR	Alexandr Dolgopolov	38	4
ESP	Fernando Verdasco	48	5
ESP	Guillermo García López	54	6
USA	Donald Young	57	7
USA	Taylor Fritz	63	8

- ^{1} Rankings are as of July 25, 2016

=== Other entrants ===
The following players received wildcards into the singles main draw:

- (United States) Jared Donaldson
- (United States) Reilly Opelka
- (United States) Austin Smith

The following player received entry using a protected ranking:

- (France) Julien Benneteau

The following players received entry from the qualifying draw:

- (United States) Christopher Eubanks
- (United States) Austin Krajicek
- (Australia) John-Patrick Smith
- (Germany) Mischa Zverev

The following player received entry as lucky losers:

- (Germany) Tobias Kamke
- (Brazil) Thiago Monteiro

=== Withdrawals ===
Before the tournament

- (France) Jérémy Chardy →replaced by (Serbia) Dušan Lajović
- (Croatia) Borna Ćorić →replaced by (Argentina) Horacio Zeballos
- (United Kingdom) Kyle Edmund →replaced by (Ukraine) Sergiy Stakhovsky
- (Spain) Marcel Granollers →replaced by (United Kingdom) Dan Evans
- (Australia) John Millman →replaced by (United States) Bjorn Fratangelo
- (France) Benoît Paire →replaced by (Netherlands) Igor Sijsling
- (France) Lucas Pouille →replaced by (Japan) Yoshihito Nishioka
- (Spain) Albert Ramos Viñolas →replaced by (Australia) replaced by Sam Groth
- (Argentina) Diego Schwartzman → replaced by (United States) Tim Smyczek

== ATP doubles main-draw entrants ==
=== Seeds ===
Country	Player	Country	Player	Rank^{1}	Seed
CRO	Ivan Dodig	PAK	Aisam-ul-Haq Qureshi	60	1
SWE	Robert Lindstedt	CRO	Mate Pavić	71	2
~~USA~~	~~Eric Butorac~~	~~AUS~~	~~Sam Groth~~	~~114~~	~~3~~
ISR	Jonathan Erlich	POL	Mariusz Fyrstenberg	121	4

- ^{1} Rankings are as of July 25, 2016

=== Other entrants ===
The following pairs received wildcards into the doubles main draw:

- (United States) Christopher Eubanks / (United States) Zack Kennedy
- (Australia) James Frawley / (Australia) Nick Kyrgios

The following pairs received entry as alternates:

- (Brazil) Thiago Monteiro / (Japan) Yoshihito Nishioka
- (South Africa) Dean O'Brien / (South Africa) Ruan Roelofse

=== Withdrawals ===
Before the tournament

- (Australia) Sam Groth
- (United States) Rajeev Ram
