= 2016 BB&T Atlanta Open – Doubles =

Doubles
- 2016 BB&T Atlanta Open

Final
- Champions: (Argentina) Andrés Molteni (Argentina) Horacio Zeballos
- Runners-up: (Sweden) Johan Brunström (Sweden) Andreas Siljeström
- Score: 7–6^{(7–2)}, 6–4

Events
Singles	Doubles
← 2015 ·	BB&T Atlanta Open	· 2017 →

Bob and Mike Bryan were the defending champions, but chose not to participate this year.

Andrés Molteni and Horacio Zeballos won the title, defeating Johan Brunström and Andreas Siljeström in the final, 7–6^{(7–2)}, 6–4.

== Seeds ==
1. (Croatia) Ivan Dodig / (Pakistan) Aisam-ul-Haq Qureshi (first round)
2. (Sweden) Robert Lindstedt / (Croatia) Mate Pavić (first round)
3. (United States) Eric Butorac / (Australia) Sam Groth (withdrew)
4. (Israel) Jonathan Erlich / (Poland) Mariusz Fyrstenberg (first round)

== Draw ==
=== Key ===
- Q = Qualifier
- WC = Wild card
- LL = Lucky loser
- Alt = Alternate
- SE = Special exempt
- PR = Protected ranking
- ITF = ITF entry
- JE = Junior exempt
- w/o = Walkover
- r = Retired
- d = Defaulted
- SR = Special ranking

=== Draw ===
First round
1	(Croatia) I Dodig (Pakistan) A-u-H Qureshi	3	1
(United Kingdom) J Marray (Canada) A Shamasdin	6	6
(Germany) T Kamke (Serbia) D Lajović	2	4
(Brazil) M Demoliner (Spain) G García-López	6	6
Alt	(South Africa) D O'Brien (South Africa) R Roelofse	6	3	[4]
(Sweden) J Brunström (Sweden) A Siljeström	4	6	[10]
(United Kingdom) D Evans (United Kingdom) K Skupski	3	7^{9}	[6]
(United States) N Monroe (New Zealand) A Sitak	6	6^{7}	[10]
(Ukraine) A Dolgopolov (Ukraine) S Stakhovsky	6	6
WC	(Australia) J Frawley (Australia) N Kyrgios	4	0
(India) P Raja (India) D Sharan	6	7^{7}
4	(Israel) J Erlich (Poland) M Fyrstenberg	3	6^{5}
WC	(United States) C Eubanks (United States) Z Kennedy	3	7^{8}	[10]
Alt	(Brazil) T Monteiro (Japan) Y Nishioka	6	6^{6}	[8]
(Argentina) A Molteni (Argentina) H Zeballos	6	6
2	(Sweden) R Lindstedt (Croatia) M Pavić	3	4

Quarterfinals
(United Kingdom) J Marray (Canada) A Shamasdin	4	2
(Brazil) M Demoliner (Spain) G García-López	6	6
(Sweden) J Brunström (Sweden) A Siljeström	6^{6}	6	[11]
(United States) N Monroe (New Zealand) A Sitak	7^{8}	4	[9]
(Ukraine) A Dolgopolov (Ukraine) S Stakhovsky
(India) P Raja (India) D Sharan	w/o
WC	(United States) C Eubanks (United States) Z Kennedy	5	5
(Argentina) A Molteni (Argentina) H Zeballos	7	7

Semifinals
(Brazil) M Demoliner (Spain) G García-López	6^{4}	2
(Sweden) J Brunström (Sweden) A Siljeström	7	6
(India) P Raja (India) D Sharan	6^{6}	6	[7]
(Argentina) A Molteni (Argentina) H Zeballos	7^{8}	4	[10]

Final
(Sweden) J Brunström (Sweden) A Siljeström	6^{2}	4
(Argentina) A Molteni (Argentina) H Zeballos	7^{7}	6
