= 2018 Brisbane International =

Coordinates: 27°31′30″S 153°0′26″E

- Date: 31 December 2017 – 7 January 2018
- Edition: 10th
- Surface: Hard / outdoor
- Location: Tennyson, Brisbane, Queensland, Australia
- Venue: Queensland Tennis Centre

Champions

Men's singles
- (Australia) Nick Kyrgios

Women's singles
- (Ukraine) Elina Svitolina

Men's doubles
- (Finland) Henri Kontinen / (Australia) John Peers

Women's doubles
- (Netherlands) Kiki Bertens / (Netherlands) Demi Schuurs
- Brisbane International

The 2018 Brisbane International was a tennis tournament on the 2018 ATP World Tour and 2018 WTA Tour. It was played on outdoor hard courts in Brisbane, Queensland, Australia. It was the tenth edition of the tournament and took place at the Queensland Tennis Centre in Tennyson. It was held from 31 December 2017 to 7 January 2018 as part of the Australian Open Series in preparation for the first Grand Slam of the year. Rafael Nadal and Andy Murray were about to start their 2018 seasons at the tournament, but both withdrew due to continuous injuries. On 5 October 2017, defending champions Grigor Dimitrov and Karolína Plíšková announced they would also compete.

== Finals ==
=== Men's singles ===
- (Australia) Nick Kyrgios defeated (United States) Ryan Harrison, 6–4, 6–2

=== Women's singles ===
- (Ukraine) Elina Svitolina defeated (Belarus) Aliaksandra Sasnovich, 6–2, 6–1

=== Men's doubles ===
- (Finland) Henri Kontinen / (Australia) John Peers defeated (Argentina) Leonardo Mayer / (Argentina) Horacio Zeballos, 3–6, 6–3, [10–2]

=== Women's doubles ===
- (Netherlands) Kiki Bertens / (Netherlands) Demi Schuurs defeated (Slovenia) Andreja Klepač / (Spain) María José Martínez Sánchez, 7–5, 6–2

== Points and prize money ==
=== Point distribution ===
Event	W	F	SF	QF	Round of 16	Round of 32	Q	Q3	Q2	Q1
Men's singles	250	150	90	45	20	0	12	6	0	—N/a
Men's doubles	250	150	90	45	0	—N/a	—N/a	—N/a	—N/a	—N/a
Women's singles	470	305	185	100	55	1	25	18	13	1
Women's doubles	470	305	185	100	1	—N/a	—N/a	—N/a	—N/a	—N/a

=== Prize money ===
Event	W	F	SF	QF	Round of 16	Round of 32^{1}	Q3	Q2	Q1
Men's singles	$83,650	$44,055	$23,865	$13,595	$8,010	$4,745	$2,135	$1,070	—N/a
Men's doubles *	$25,410	$13,360	$7,240	$4,140	$2,430	—N/a	—N/a	—N/a	—N/a
Women's singles	$190,732	$101,475	$54,200	$23,265	$12,477	$6,813	$3,560	$1,890	$1,050
Women's doubles *	$47,545	$25,410	$13,880	$7,062	$3,839	—N/a	—N/a	—N/a	—N/a

_{^{1}Qualifiers prize money is also the Round of 32 prize money.}
_{*per team}

== ATP singles main-draw entrants ==
=== Seeds ===
Country	Player	Rank^{1}	Seed
BUL	Grigor Dimitrov	3	1
~~GBR~~	~~Andy Murray~~	~~16~~	~~2~~
AUS	Nick Kyrgios	21	3
CAN	Milos Raonic	24	4
LUX	Gilles Müller	25	5
ARG	Diego Schwartzman	26	6
BIH	Damir Džumhur	30	7
GER	Mischa Zverev	33	8

- ^{1} Rankings are as of 25 December 2017.

=== Other entrants ===
The following players received wildcards into the singles main draw:

- (Australia) Alex de Minaur
- (Australia) John Millman
- (Australia) Jordan Thompson

The following players received entry from the qualifying draw:

- (United States) Ernesto Escobedo
- (United States) Michael Mmoh
- (Canada) Peter Polansky
- (Australia) John-Patrick Smith

The following player received entry as a lucky loser:

- (Germany) Yannick Hanfmann

=== Withdrawals ===
Before the tournament

- (United Kingdom) Andy Murray → replaced by (Germany) Yannick Hanfmann
- (Spain) Rafael Nadal → replaced by (Australia) Matthew Ebden
- (Japan) Kei Nishikori → replaced by (United States) Frances Tiafoe

=== Retirements ===
- (Uzbekistan) Denis Istomin

== ATP doubles main-draw entrants ==
=== Seeds ===
Country	Player	Country	Player	Rank^{1}	Seed
FIN	Henri Kontinen	AUS	John Peers	7	1
BRA	Marcelo Demoliner	NZL	Michael Venus	49	2
MEX	Santiago González	CHI	Julio Peralta	57	3
NZL	Marcus Daniell	GBR	Dominic Inglot	88	4

- ^{1} Rankings are as of 25 December 2017.

=== Other entrants ===
The following pair received a wildcard into the doubles main draw:

- (Australia) Lleyton Hewitt / (Australia) Jordan Thompson

=== Withdrawals ===
During the tournament

- (United States) Ryan Harrison

== WTA singles main-draw entrants ==
=== Seeds ===
Country	Player	Rank^{1}	Seed
ESP	Garbiñe Muguruza	2	1
CZE	Karolína Plíšková	4	2
UKR	Elina Svitolina	6	3
FRA	Caroline Garcia	8	4
GBR	Johanna Konta	9	5
FRA	Kristina Mladenovic	11	6
LAT	Anastasija Sevastova	16	7
AUS	Ashleigh Barty	17	8

- ^{1} Rankings are as of 25 December 2017.

=== Other entrants ===
The following players received wildcards into the singles main draw:

- (Australia) Destanee Aiava
- (Croatia) Ajla Tomljanović

The following players received entry from the qualifying draw:

- (Ukraine) Kateryna Bondarenko
- (United States) Jennifer Brady
- (Estonia) Kaia Kanepi
- (Belarus) Aliaksandra Sasnovich

The following player received entry as a lucky loser:

- (United Kingdom) Heather Watson

=== Withdrawals ===
Before the tournament

- (Czech Republic) Petra Kvitová → replaced by (United Kingdom) Heather Watson
- (Slovakia) Magdaléna Rybáriková → replaced by (United States) Catherine Bellis
- (United States) Sloane Stephens (knee injury) → replaced by (Croatia) Ana Konjuh
- (Russia) Elena Vesnina → replaced by (Germany) Tatjana Maria

=== Retirements ===
- (France) Caroline Garcia
- (United Kingdom) Johanna Konta
- (Spain) Garbiñe Muguruza

== WTA doubles main-draw entrants ==
=== Seeds ===
Country	Player	Country	Player	Rank^{1}	Seed
TPE	Latisha Chan	CZE	Andrea Sestini Hlaváčková	6	1
AUS	Ashleigh Barty	AUS	Casey Dellacqua	21	2
CAN	Gabriela Dabrowski	CHN	Xu Yifan	34	3
SLO	Andreja Klepač	ESP	María José Martínez Sánchez	48	4

- ^{1} Rankings are as of 25 December 2017.

=== Other entrants ===
The following pairs received a wildcard into the doubles main draw:

- (Australia) Priscilla Hon / (Croatia) Ajla Tomljanović
- (United States) Madison Keys / (United Kingdom) Heather Watson

The following pair received entry as an alternate:

- (Romania) Sorana Cîrstea / (Latvia) Anastasija Sevastova

=== Withdrawals ===
Before the tournament

- (Spain) Carla Suárez Navarro
