= 2015 US Open Series =

In tennis, the 2015 US Open Series (known as Emirates Airline US Open Series for sponsorship reasons) is the twelfth edition of the US Open Series, which includes a group of hard court tournaments that starts on July 27, 2015 in Atlanta and concluded in Winston-Salem for the men and in New Haven for the women on August 30, 2015. This edition consists of three separate men's tournaments and three women's tournaments, with the Western & Southern Open hosting both a men's and women's event. The series is headlined by two ATP World Tour Masters 1000 and two WTA Premier 5 events.

== Point distribution for series events ==
In order to be included in the final standings and subsequently the bonus prize money, a player needs to have countable results from at least two different tournaments. Starting from the 2014 season, a new rule has been added to double the points of a player who has obtained countable results in at least three tournaments.

The players who finish in the top three in the series can earn up to $1 million in extra prize money at the US Open.

Round	ATP Masters 1000 WTA Premier 5	ATP World Tour 250 WTA Premier
Winner	100	70
Finalist	70	45
Semifinalist	45	25
Quarterfinalist	25	15
Round of 16	15	0

== US Open Series standings ==
The standings include all players who received points in at least two tournaments.

=== ATP ===
Rank	Nation	Player	Tours ^{1}	Titles	Points
1	GBR	Andy Murray	2	1	145
2	SRB	Novak Djokovic	2		140
3	USA	John Isner	2	1	95
4	RSA	Kevin Anderson	2	1	85
5	LUX	Gilles Müller	2		40
5	ESP	Rafael Nadal	2		40
7	BEL	David Goffin	2		30
7	POL	Jerzy Janowicz	2		30
7	CRO	Ivo Karlović	2		30

Notes:

- 1 – Tours – Number of tournaments in US Open Series in which a player has reached the quarterfinals or better, in 250 series events, or the Round of 16 in ATP World Tour Masters 1000 events.
- 2 – Indicates a player has earned points in at least three Emirates Airline US Open Series events, therefore doubling his point total earned on the Series.

=== WTA ===
Rank	Nation	Player	Tours ^{1}	Titles	Points
1	CZE	Karolína Plíšková	3		150^{2}
2	USA	Serena Williams	2	1	145
3	ROU	Simona Halep	2		140
4	SUI	Belinda Bencic	2	1	115
5	POL	Agnieszka Radwańska	3		110^{2}
6	GER	Angelique Kerber	2	1	85
7	CZE	Lucie Šafářová	2		70
7	UKR	Elina Svitolina	2		70
9	SRB	Ana Ivanovic	2		50
9	UKR	Lesia Tsurenko	2		50
11	USA	Varvara Lepchenko	2		40
12	BLR	Victoria Azarenka	2		30
12	FRA	Caroline Garcia	2		30
12	GER	Andrea Petkovic	2		30

Notes:

- 1 – Tours – Number of tournaments in US Open Series in which a player has reached the quarterfinals or better, in Premier events; or the Round of 16 or better in Premier 5 events.
- 2 – Indicates a player has earned points in at least three Emirates Airline US Open Series events, therefore doubling her point total earned on the Series.

== Bonus prize money ==
Top three players in the 2015 US Open Series will receive bonus prize money, depending on where they finish in the 2015 US Open, according to money schedule below.

2015 Emirates Airline US Open Series Finish	2015 US Open Finish								Awardees	
2015 Emirates Airline US Open Series Finish	W	F	SF	QF	Round of 16	Round of 32	Round of 64	Round of 128	Awardees	
1st Place	$1,000,000	$500,000	$250,000	$125,000	$70,000	$40,000	$25,000	$15,000	(United Kingdom) Andy Murray	$70,000
1st Place	$1,000,000	$500,000	$250,000	$125,000	$70,000	$40,000	$25,000	$15,000	(Czech Republic) Karolína Plíšková	$15,000
2nd Place	$500,000	$250,000	$125,000	$62,500	$35,000	$20,000	$12,500	$7,500	(Serbia) Novak Djokovic	$500,000
2nd Place	$500,000	$250,000	$125,000	$62,500	$35,000	$20,000	$12,500	$7,500	(United States) Serena Williams	$125,000
3rd Place	$250,000	$125,000	$62,500	$31,250	$17,500	$10,000	$6,250	$3,750	(United States) John Isner	$17,500
3rd Place	$250,000	$125,000	$62,500	$31,250	$17,500	$10,000	$6,250	$3,750	(Romania) Simona Halep	$62,500

== Tournament Schedule ==
Legend
Grand Slam Event
ATP Masters 1000 and WTA Premier 5
ATP World Tour 500 and WTA Premier
ATP World Tour 250 and WTA International

Week	Date	Men's Events	Women's Events
1	July 27 – August 2	Atlanta; BB&T Atlanta Open; 2015 Champion: (United States) John Isner	No Series Event Held This Week
2	August 3 – August 9	No Series Event Held This Week	Stanford; Bank of the West Classic; 2015 Champion: (Germany) Angelique Kerber
3	August 10 – August 16	Montreal; Rogers Cup presented by National Bank; 2015 Champion: (United Kingdom) Andy Murray	Toronto; Rogers Cup presented by National Bank; 2015 Champion: (Switzerland) Belinda Bencic
4	August 17 – August 23	Cincinnati; Western & Southern Open; 2015 Champion: (Switzerland) Roger Federer	Cincinnati; Western & Southern Open; 2015 Champion: (United States) Serena Williams
5	August 24 – August 30	Winston-Salem; Winston-Salem Open; 2015 Champion: (South Africa) Kevin Anderson	New Haven; Connecticut Open; 2015 Champion: (Czech Republic) Petra Kvitová
6–7	August 31 – September 13	New York; US Open; 2015 Champion: (Serbia) Novak Djokovic	New York; US Open; 2015 Champion: (Italy) Flavia Pennetta

== Week 1 ==
=== ATP – BB&T Atlanta Open ===
American John Isner and doubles partners Vasek Pospisil and Jack Sock headlined the event as the top three seeds. Isner, a two-time defending champion, advanced to the third straight final, losing only one set against fellow American and a qualifier at the tournament Denis Kudla in semifinals. Marcos Baghdatis, a fifth seed, advanced to his first final since 2011, defeating second seed Pospisil before edging Gilles Müller in three sets to reach final. In the final, Isner claimed his 10th career title after defeating Baghdatis 6–3, 6–3.

==== Main draw finals ====
Quarterfinals
1	(United States) John Isner	7^{7}	6
(Lithuania) Ričardas Berankis	6^{5}	4
Q	(United States) Denis Kudla	7	6
(Israel) Dudi Sela	5	0
7	(Luxembourg) Gilles Müller	7	6
(Japan) Go Soeda	5	1
5	(Cyprus) Marcos Baghdatis	6	7^{7}
2	(Canada) Vasek Pospisil	4	6^{5}

Semifinals
1	(United States) John Isner	4	6	7
Q	(United States) Denis Kudla	6	2	5
7	(Luxembourg) Gilles Müller	7^{7}	3	6^{4}
5	(Cyprus) Marcos Baghdatis	6^{4}	6	7^{7}

Final
1	(United States) John Isner	6	6
5	(Cyprus) Marcos Baghdatis	3	3

== Week 2 ==
=== WTA – Bank of the West Classic ===
Caroline Wozniacki, Agnieszka Radwańska and Angelique Kerber headlined the event. In the first half of the draw, three seeds of four were upset in the second round, including first seed Wozniacki, who lost to Varvara Lepchenko. As a result, fourth seed Karolína Plíšková reached final without dropping set, beating Lepchenko in a semifinal. In the other side of the draw, Angelique Kerber defeated Radwańska in three sets, before easy semifinal win over eight seed Elina Svitolina. Kerber beat Plíšková 6–3, 5–7, 6–4 to win her fourth title of the year, tying Serena Williams at the moment.

==== Main draw finals ====
Quarterfinals
(United States) Varvara Lepchenko	6^{3}	6	6
(Germany) Mona Barthel	7^{7}	2	3
4	(Czech Republic) Karolína Plíšková	6	6
(Croatia) Ajla Tomljanović	2	4
8	(Ukraine) Elina Svitolina	4	7	6
(United States) Alison Riske	6	5	1
5	(Germany) Angelique Kerber	4	6	6
2/WC	(Poland) Agnieszka Radwańska	6	4	4

Semifinals
(United States) Varvara Lepchenko	2	5
4	(Czech Republic) Karolína Plíšková	6	7
8	(Ukraine) Elina Svitolina	3	1
5	(Germany) Angelique Kerber	6	6

Final
4	(Czech Republic) Karolína Plíšková	3	7	4
5	(Germany) Angelique Kerber	6	5	6

== Week 3 ==
=== ATP – Rogers Cup (Montreal) ===
Eight of the world top 10 players headlined the event, with Novak Djokovic, Andy Murray and Stan Wawrinka led the field. Qualifier Ernests Gulbis had two match points against first seed Djokovic in quarterfinals, but eventually lost. Djokovic went on to reach the final, after win over another unseeded player, Jérémy Chardy. Murray beat defending champion Jo-Wilfried Tsonga in quarterfinals, before losing just three games against Kei Nishikori in semifinals. Murray defeated Djokovic in the final 6–4, 4–6, 6–3, meaning that Djokovic lost for the first time since 2012 when playing in Masters 1000 final, a streak that included 12 titles.

==== Main draw finals ====
Third Round
1	(Serbia) Novak Djokovic	6	6
(United States) Jack Sock	2	1
Q	(Latvia) Ernests Gulbis	6	6
Q	(United States) Donald Young	4	4
(Australia) Nick Kyrgios	5	3
16	(United States) John Isner	7	6
(France) Jérémy Chardy	4	7^{7}	6
(Croatia) Ivo Karlović	6	6^{1}	4
7	(Spain) Rafael Nadal	6	6
Q	(Russia) Mikhail Youzhny	3	3
13	(Belgium) David Goffin	4	4
4	(Japan) Kei Nishikori	6	6
(Australia) Bernard Tomic	6^{7}	3
10	(France) Jo-Wilfried Tsonga	7^{9}	6
(Luxembourg) Gilles Müller	3	2
2	(United Kingdom) Andy Murray	6	6

Quarterfinals
1	(Serbia) Novak Djokovic	5	7^{9}	6
Q	(Latvia) Ernests Gulbis	7	6^{7}	1
16	(United States) John Isner	7^{11}	6^{13}	6^{4}
(France) Jérémy Chardy	6^{9}	7^{15}	7^{7}
7	(Spain) Rafael Nadal	2	4
4	(Japan) Kei Nishikori	6	6
10	(France) Jo-Wilfried Tsonga	4	4
2	(United Kingdom) Andy Murray	6	6

Semifinals
1	(Serbia) Novak Djokovic	6	6
(France) Jérémy Chardy	4	4
4	(Japan) Kei Nishikori	3	0
2	(United Kingdom) Andy Murray	6	6

Final
1	(Serbia) Novak Djokovic	4	6	3
2	(United Kingdom) Andy Murray	6	4	6

=== WTA – Rogers Cup (Toronto) ===
Nine of the world top 10 players headlined the event, with Serena Williams, wildcard Simona Halep and Petra Kvitová being the top 3 seeds. Though Williams came fresh-off two grand slam titles, it was all about young Swiss Belinda Bencic in that half of draw, who defeated five Grand Slam finalists in a row to reach the final, including also three wins over top 10 players at the moment, against Caroline Wozniacki, Ana Ivanovic in quarterfinals, and Williams in semifinals. In the bottom half of the draw, Halep faced also three grand slam finalists, and after defeating Sara Errani she reached the final. In the final, Bencic became the youngest player to win the tournament, overtaking feat from Ivanovic, when was up 7–6^{(7–5)}, 6–7^{(4–7)}, 3–0 before another grand slam finalist Halep retired.

==== Main draw finals ====
Third Round
1	(United States) Serena Williams	6	6
16	(Germany) Andrea Petkovic	3	2
(Italy) Roberta Vinci	6	6
(Russia) Daria Gavrilova	4	3
(Switzerland) Belinda Bencic	6	1	7^{7}
(Germany) Sabine Lisicki	1	6	6^{3}
Q	(Slovenia) Polona Hercog	2	3
5	(Serbia) Ana Ivanovic	6	6
Q	(Ukraine) Lesia Tsurenko	6	6
Q	(Germany) Carina Witthöft	3	4
15	(Italy) Sara Errani	7	6
(Belarus) Victoria Azarenka	5	3
6	(Poland) Agnieszka Radwańska	6	4	6
(France) Alizé Cornet	2	6	4
13	(Germany) Angelique Kerber	3	7	4
2/WC	(Romania) Simona Halep	6	5	6

Quarterfinals
1	(United States) Serena Williams	6	6
(Italy) Roberta Vinci	4	3
(Switzerland) Belinda Bencic	6	6
5	(Serbia) Ana Ivanovic	4	2
Q	(Ukraine) Lesia Tsurenko	4	4
15	(Italy) Sara Errani	6	6
6	(Poland) Agnieszka Radwańska	6	3	1
2/WC	(Romania) Simona Halep	0	6	6

Semifinals
1	(United States) Serena Williams	6	5	4
(Switzerland) Belinda Bencic	3	7	6
15	(Italy) Sara Errani	4	4
2/WC	(Romania) Simona Halep	6	6

Final
(Switzerland) Belinda Bencic	7^{7}	6^{4}	3
2/WC	(Romania) Simona Halep	6^{5}	7^{7}	0^{r}

== Week 4 ==
=== ATP – Western & Southern Open (Cincinnati) ===
Nine of the world top 10 players entered the tournament, with the pack headlined by top three players: Novak Djokovic, recent Montreal champion Andy Murray and Roger Federer, who missed Montreal. First seed Djokovic lost set against David Goffin and qualifier Alexandr Dolgopolov in semifinals. In both occasions he came back from brink of the loss, when trailing 0–3 in third set in former, and being two points away from losing in latter. Playing in his first tournament since the Wimbledon final, Federer reached the final of the tournament after defeating Murray in the semifinals. Federer ended up winning seventh Cincinnati title after defeating Djokovic 7–6^{(7–1)}, 6–3, which ensured his position as the No. 2 seed in the upcoming US Open.

==== Main draw finals ====
Third Round
1	(Serbia) Novak Djokovic	6	2	6
13	(Belgium) David Goffin	4	6	3
(Croatia) Ivo Karlović	7^{7}	6^{5}	6^{5}
5	(Switzerland) Stan Wawrinka	6^{2}	7^{7}	7^{7}
Q	(Ukraine) Alexandr Dolgopolov	6	3	6
(Poland) Jerzy Janowicz	3	6	4
(Spain) Tommy Robredo	0	1
6	(Czech Republic) Tomáš Berdych	6	6
7	(Croatia) Marin Čilić	5	3
12	(France) Richard Gasquet	7	6
16	(Bulgaria) Grigor Dimitrov	6	6^{3}	5
3	(United Kingdom) Andy Murray	4	7^{7}	7
8	(Spain) Rafael Nadal	7	4	6^{3}
(Spain) Feliciano López	5	6	7^{7}
15	(South Africa) Kevin Anderson	1	1
2	(Switzerland) Roger Federer	6	6

Quarterfinals
1	(Serbia) Novak Djokovic	6	6
5	(Switzerland) Stan Wawrinka	4	1
Q	(Ukraine) Alexandr Dolgopolov	6	6
6	(Czech Republic) Tomáš Berdych	4	2
12	(France) Richard Gasquet	6	1	4
3	(United Kingdom) Andy Murray	4	6	6
(Spain) Feliciano López	3	4
2	(Switzerland) Roger Federer	6	6

Semifinals
1	(Serbia) Novak Djokovic	4	7^{7}	6
Q	(Ukraine) Alexandr Dolgopolov	6	6^{5}	2
3	(United Kingdom) Andy Murray	4	6^{6}
2	(Switzerland) Roger Federer	6	7^{8}

Final
1	(Serbia) Novak Djokovic	6^{1}	3
2	(Switzerland) Roger Federer	7^{7}	6

=== WTA – Western & Southern Open (Cincinnati) ===
All of the top 10 players entered the tournament, but later no. 2 Maria Sharapova withdrew, as she did also in Toronto. Other top four seeds then headlined the tournament, with the pack led by Serena Williams, Simona Halep and Petra Kvitová. Williams worked hard to beat sixth seed Ana Ivanovic in quarterfinals, who led by a set and break, but except that win all were much easier, including semifinal win over Elina Svitolina. In bottom half of the draw, Halep lost two sets in both matches before quarterfinals, but then had two straight sets victories, with semifinal win over Jelena Janković securing place in the final and also her position as the no. 2 seed in the upcoming US Open. Williams went on to defend title by beating Halep 6–3, 7–6^{(7–5)}, in the final.

==== Main draw finals ====
Third Round
1	(United States) Serena Williams	6	6
(Italy) Karin Knapp	0	2
(United States) Sloane Stephens	6	4	1
6	(Serbia) Ana Ivanovic	2	6	6
(France) Caroline Garcia	0	3
14	(Ukraine) Elina Svitolina	6	6
(Switzerland) Belinda Bencic	2	0^{r}
7	(Czech Republic) Lucie Šafářová	6	0
(Belarus) Victoria Azarenka	6	0^{r}
(Russia) Anastasia Pavlyuchenkova	1	3
15	(Germany) Andrea Petkovic	6	4	2
3	(Romania) Simona Halep	4	6	6
8	(Czech Republic) Karolína Plíšková	2	6	5
(Serbia) Jelena Janković	6	3	7
Q	(Slovakia) Anna Karolína Schmiedlová	6	3	6
(United States) Varvara Lepchenko	3	6	4

Quarterfinals
1	(United States) Serena Williams	3	6	6
6	(Serbia) Ana Ivanovic	6	4	2
14	(Ukraine) Elina Svitolina	6	2	6
7	(Czech Republic) Lucie Šafářová	4	6	0
(Russia) Anastasia Pavlyuchenkova	6^{3}	2
3	(Romania) Simona Halep	7^{7}	6
(Serbia) Jelena Janković	6	6
Q	(Slovakia) Anna Karolína Schmiedlová	4	2

Semifinals
1	(United States) Serena Williams	6	6
14	(Ukraine) Elina Svitolina	4	3
3	(Romania) Simona Halep	6	6
(Serbia) Jelena Janković	1	2

Final
1	(United States) Serena Williams	6	7^{7}
3	(Romania) Simona Halep	3	6^{5}

== Week 5 ==
=== ATP – Winston-Salem Open ===
==== Main draw finals ====
Quarterfinals
Q	(France) Pierre-Hugues Herbert	4	7^{7}	6
(Spain) Pablo Carreño Busta	6	6^{5}	2
13	(United States) Steve Johnson	w/o
(Chinese Taipei) Lu Yen-hsun
6	(Brazil) Thomaz Bellucci	3	2
(Tunisia) Malek Jaziri	6	6
8	(Croatia) Borna Ćorić	2	6^{1}
2/WC	(South Africa) Kevin Anderson	6	7^{7}

Semifinals
Q	(France) Pierre-Hugues Herbert	3	7^{7}	6
13	(United States) Steve Johnson	6	6^{5}	2
(Tunisia) Malek Jaziri	4	3
2/WC	(South Africa) Kevin Anderson	6	6

Final
Q	(France) Pierre-Hugues Herbert	4	5
2/WC	(South Africa) Kevin Anderson	6	7

=== WTA – Connecticut Open ===
==== Main draw finals ====
Quarterfinals
LL	(Ukraine) Lesia Tsurenko	6	6
5	(Czech Republic) Karolína Plíšková	2	2
4/WC	(Czech Republic) Lucie Šafářová	6^{4}	6	7
(Slovakia) Dominika Cibulková	7^{7}	4	5
(France) Caroline Garcia	3	0
3/WC	(Denmark) Caroline Wozniacki	6	6
7/WC	(Poland) Agnieszka Radwańska	5	4
2	(Czech Republic) Petra Kvitová	7	6

Semifinals
LL	(Ukraine) Lesia Tsurenko	2	6^{4}
4/WC	(Czech Republic) Lucie Šafářová	6	7^{7}
3/WC	(Denmark) Caroline Wozniacki	5	1
2	(Czech Republic) Petra Kvitová	7	6

Final
4/WC	(Czech Republic) Lucie Šafářová	7^{8}	2	2
2	(Czech Republic) Petra Kvitová	6^{6}	6	6
