= 2018 Brisbane International – Women's singles =

Coordinates: 27°31′30″S 153°0′26″E

Women's singles
- 2018 Brisbane International

Final
- Champion: (Ukraine) Elina Svitolina
- Runner-up: (Belarus) Aliaksandra Sasnovich
- Score: 6–2, 6–1

Details
- Draw: 30 (4 Q / 2 WC )
- Seeds: 8

Events
Singles	men	women
Doubles	men	women
- Brisbane International

Karolína Plíšková was the defending champion, but lost in the semifinals to Elina Svitolina.

Svitolina went on to win the title, defeating Aliaksandra Sasnovich in the final, 6–2, 6–1.

Garbiñe Muguruza was in contention for the WTA No. 1 singles ranking at the start of the tournament, but she retired during her opening second round match. As such, Simona Halep retained the No. 1 ranking. Of note, it was the fourth consecutive edition of the tournament that Muguruza had to retire or withdraw from due to injury.

== Seeds ==
The top two seeds received a bye into the second round.

1. (Spain) Garbiñe Muguruza (second round, retired)
2. (Czech Republic) Karolína Plíšková (semifinals)
3. (Ukraine) Elina Svitolina (champion)
4. (France) Caroline Garcia (first round, retired)
5. (United Kingdom) Johanna Konta (quarterfinals, retired)
6. (France) Kristina Mladenovic (first round)
7. (Latvia) Anastasija Sevastova (semifinals)
8. (Australia) Ashleigh Barty (first round)

== Draw ==
=== Finals ===
Semifinals
7	(Latvia) Anastasija Sevastova	6^{3}	4
Q	(Belarus) Aliaksandra Sasnovich	7^{7}	6
3	(Ukraine) Elina Svitolina	7	7
2	(Czech Republic) Karolína Plíšková	5	5

Final
Q	(Belarus) Aliaksandra Sasnovich	2	1
3	(Ukraine) Elina Svitolina	6	6

=== Top half ===
First round
(Germany) C Witthöft	5	6^{2}
(Serbia) A Krunić	7	7^{7}
Q	(United States) J Brady	6^{3}	1
(Romania) S Cîrstea	7^{7}	6
(Australia) S Stosur	1	3
7	(Latvia) A Sevastova	6	6
4	(France) C Garcia	6	3	0^{r}
(France) A Cornet	3	6	0
(Germany) T Maria	4	6	0
(Croatia) M Lučić-Baroni	6	4	6
LL	(United Kingdom) H Watson	0	3
(Estonia) A Kontaveit	6	6
Q	(Belarus) A Sasnovich	1	6	7
6	(France) K Mladenovic	6	3	5

Second round
1	(Spain) G Muguruza	7	6^{3}	2^{r}
(Serbia) A Krunić	5	7^{7}	1
(Romania) S Cîrstea	2	1
7	(Latvia) A Sevastova	6	6
(France) A Cornet	6	7
(Croatia) M Lučić-Baroni	1	5
(Estonia) A Kontaveit	6	6^{2}	3
Q	(Belarus) A Sasnovich	1	7^{7}	6

Quarterfinals
(Serbia) A Krunić	2	4
7	(Latvia) A Sevastova	6	6
(France) A Cornet	6	2	3
Q	(Belarus) A Sasnovich	3	6	6

Semifinals
7	(Latvia) A Sevastova	6^{3}	4
Q	(Belarus) A Sasnovich	7^{7}	6

=== Bottom half ===
First round
5	(United Kingdom) J Konta	4	6	6
(United States) M Keys	6	4	3
WC	(Australia) D Aiava	1	4
WC	(Croatia) A Tomljanović	6	6
(Netherlands) K Bertens	1	2
(Croatia) A Konjuh	6	6
(Spain) C Suárez Navarro	2	4
3	(Ukraine) E Svitolina	6	6
8	(Australia) A Barty	3	2
(Ukraine) L Tsurenko	6	6
Q	(Estonia) K Kanepi	6	6
(Russia) D Kasatkina	2	2
Q	(Ukraine) K Bondarenko	2	5
(United States) C Bellis	6	7

Second round
5	(United Kingdom) J Konta	4	6	6
WC	(Croatia) A Tomljanović	6	1	4
(Croatia) A Konjuh	3	1
3	(Ukraine) E Svitolina	6	6
(Ukraine) L Tsurenko	4	3
Q	(Estonia) K Kanepi	6	6
(United States) C Bellis	1	1
2	(Czech Republic) Ka Plíšková	6	6

Quarterfinals
5	(United Kingdom) J Konta	6	6^{6}	2^{r}
3	(Ukraine) E Svitolina	1	7^{8}	3
Q	(Estonia) K Kanepi	6	5	2
2	(Czech Republic) Ka Plíšková	3	7	6

Semifinals
3	(Ukraine) E Svitolina	7	7
2	(Czech Republic) Ka Plíšková	5	5

== Qualifying ==
=== Seeds ===
1. (Russia) Natalia Vikhlyantseva (second round, withdrew)
2. (United States) Jennifer Brady (qualified)
3. (United Kingdom) Heather Watson (qualifying competition; lucky loser)
4. (Belarus) Aliaksandra Sasnovich (qualified)
5. (Ukraine) Kateryna Bondarenko (qualified)
6. (Germany) Andrea Petkovic (first round)
7. (Estonia) Kaia Kanepi (qualified)
8. (United States) Kristie Ahn (qualifying competition)

=== Qualifiers ===
1. (Ukraine) Kateryna Bondarenko
2. (United States) Jennifer Brady
3. (Estonia) Kaia Kanepi
4. (Belarus) Aliaksandra Sasnovich

=== Lucky losers ===
1. (United Kingdom) Heather Watson

=== Qualifying draw ===
==== First qualifier ====
First round
1	(Russia) Natalia Vikhlyantseva	7^{7}	6
(Bulgaria) Viktoriya Tomova	6^{4}	3
(Ukraine) Dayana Yastremska	6	6
(Belarus) Vera Lapko	2	4
(France) Alizé Lim	6	3	2
(Australia) Jaimee Fourlis	1	6	6
WC	(Australia) Naiktha Bains	1	4
5	(Ukraine) Kateryna Bondarenko	6	6

Second round
1	(Russia) Natalia Vikhlyantseva
(Ukraine) Dayana Yastremska	w/o
(Australia) Jaimee Fourlis	5	1
5	(Ukraine) Kateryna Bondarenko	7	6

Qualifying competition
(Ukraine) Dayana Yastremska	2	6	4
5	(Ukraine) Kateryna Bondarenko	6	4	6

==== Second qualifier ====
First round
2	(United States) Jennifer Brady	7	6
(Australia) Lizette Cabrera	5	1
(United States) Irina Falconi	4	6	6
(United States) Caroline Dolehide	6	2	4
(Hungary) Fanny Stollár	3	4
(Australia) Priscilla Hon	6	6
(Germany) Antonia Lottner	5	1
8	(United States) Kristie Ahn	7	6

Second round
2	(United States) Jennifer Brady	6	6
(United States) Irina Falconi	1	2
(Australia) Priscilla Hon	3	4
8	(United States) Kristie Ahn	6	6

Qualifying competition
2	(United States) Jennifer Brady	6	6
8	(United States) Kristie Ahn	1	4

==== Third qualifier ====
First round
3	(United Kingdom) Heather Watson	7	6
(United States) Danielle Lao	5	3
(Japan) Misaki Doi	7^{12}	6
(Slovenia) Tamara Zidanšek	6^{10}	4
(United States) Kayla Day	1	1
WC	(Australia) Sara Tomic	6	6
WC	(Australia) Kimberly Birrell	1	3
7	(Estonia) Kaia Kanepi	6	6

Second round
3	(United Kingdom) Heather Watson	6	6
(Japan) Misaki Doi	2	4
WC	(Australia) Sara Tomic	1	4
7	(Estonia) Kaia Kanepi	6	6

Qualifying competition
3	(United Kingdom) Heather Watson	4	1
7	(Estonia) Kaia Kanepi	6	6

==== Fourth qualifier ====
First round
4	(Belarus) Aliaksandra Sasnovich	6	6
(United States) Julia Boserup	1	4
(Australia) Isabelle Wallace	4	6	6
WC	(Australia) Tammi Patterson	6	3	4
(Australia) Olivia Rogowska	6	5	6^{5}
(United States) Bernarda Pera	4	7	7^{7}
(Russia) Polina Monova	6	6
6	(Germany) Andrea Petkovic	3	3

Second round
4	(Belarus) Aliaksandra Sasnovich	6	6
(Australia) Isabelle Wallace	3	1
(United States) Bernarda Pera	3	7^{7}	3
(Russia) Polina Monova	6	6^{4}	6

Qualifying competition
4	(Belarus) Aliaksandra Sasnovich	3	7	6
(Russia) Polina Monova	6	5	2
