= 2018 Brisbane International – Women's doubles =

Women's doubles
- 2018 Brisbane International

Final
- Champions: (Netherlands) Kiki Bertens (Netherlands) Demi Schuurs
- Runners-up: (Slovenia) Andreja Klepač (Spain) María José Martínez Sánchez
- Score: 7–5, 6–2

Details
- Draw: 16
- Seeds: 4

Events
| Singles | men | women |
| Doubles | men | women |
- Brisbane International

Bethanie Mattek-Sands and Sania Mirza were the defending champions, but both players could not participate this year due to injuries.

The unseeded Dutch team of Kiki Bertens and Demi Schuurs won the title, defeating Andreja Klepač and María José Martínez Sánchez in the final, 7–5, 6–2.

== Seeds ==
1. (Chinese Taipei) Latisha Chan / (Czech Republic) Andrea Sestini Hlaváčková (semifinals)
2. (Australia) Ashleigh Barty / (Australia) Casey Dellacqua (semifinals)
3. (Canada) Gabriela Dabrowski / (China) Xu Yifan (quarterfinals)
4. (Slovenia) Andreja Klepač / (Spain) María José Martínez Sánchez (final)

== Draw ==
Key

- Q = Qualifier
- WC = Wild card
- LL = Lucky loser
- Alt = Alternate
- ITF = ITF entry
- PR = Protected ranking
- SR = Special ranking
- SE = Special exempt
- JE = Junior exempt
- JR = Junior Accelerator Programme entrant
- CO = College Accelerator Programme entrant
- NG = Next Gen Accelerator Program entrant
- w/o = Walkover
- r = Retired
- d = Defaulted

=== Draw ===
First round
1 | (Chinese Taipei) L Chan (Czech Republic) A Sestini Hlaváčková | 6 | 6
(Netherlands) M Krajicek (Russia) A Kudryavtseva | 3 | 0
(Chinese Taipei) H-c Chan (Slovenia) K Srebotnik | 6 | 6^{2} | [6]
(Ukraine) N Kichenok (Australia) An Rodionova | 3 | 7^{7} | [10]
4 | (Slovenia) A Klepač (Spain) MJ Martínez Sánchez | 6 | 6
(Japan) S Aoyama (China) Z Yang | 1 | 3
(Ukraine) L Kichenok (Japan) M Ninomiya | 6 | 6
Alt | (Romania) S Cîrstea (Latvia) A Sevastova | 1 | 2
(United Kingdom) J Konta (Ukraine) E Svitolina | 2 | 2
(Netherlands) K Bertens (Netherlands) D Schuurs | 6 | 6
(Australia) M Adamczak (Australia) S Sanders | 4 | 7^{7} | [7]
3 | (Canada) G Dabrowski (China) Y Xu | 6 | 6^{5} | [10]
WC | (Australia) P Hon (Croatia) A Tomljanović | 6^{3} | 6 | [14]
(Poland) A Rosolska (United States) A Spears | 7^{7} | 3 | [12]
WC | (United States) M Keys (United Kingdom) H Watson | 3 | 1
2 | (Australia) A Barty (Australia) C Dellacqua | 6 | 6

Quarterfinals
1 | (Chinese Taipei) L Chan (Czech Republic) A Sestini Hlaváčková | 7^{7} | 7^{7}
(Ukraine) N Kichenok (Australia) An Rodionova | 6^{5} | 6^{2}
4 | (Slovenia) A Klepač (Spain) MJ Martínez Sánchez | 5 | 7 | [10]
(Ukraine) L Kichenok (Japan) M Ninomiya | 7 | 5 | [7]
(Netherlands) K Bertens (Netherlands) D Schuurs | 5 | 6 | [10]
3 | (Canada) G Dabrowski (China) Y Xu | 7 | 3 | [6]
WC | (Australia) P Hon (Croatia) A Tomljanović | 5 | 1
2 | (Australia) A Barty (Australia) C Dellacqua | 7 | 6

Semifinals
1 | (Chinese Taipei) L Chan (Czech Republic) A Sestini Hlaváčková | 6^{3} | 6 | [9]
4 | (Slovenia) A Klepač (Spain) MJ Martínez Sánchez | 7^{7} | 3 | [11]
(Netherlands) K Bertens (Netherlands) D Schuurs | 6^{2} | 6 | [10]
2 | (Australia) A Barty (Australia) C Dellacqua | 7^{7} | 3 | [8]

Final
4 | (Slovenia) A Klepač (Spain) MJ Martínez Sánchez | 5 | 2
(Netherlands) K Bertens (Netherlands) D Schuurs | 7 | 6
