= 2015 BB&T Atlanta Open – Singles =

Singles
- 2015 BB&T Atlanta Open

Final
- Champion: (United States) John Isner
- Runner-up: (Cyprus) Marcos Baghdatis
- Score: 6–3, 6–3

Details
- Draw: 28 (4 Q / 3 WC )
- Seeds: 8

Events
Singles	Doubles
← 2014 ·	BB&T Atlanta Open	· 2016 →

John Isner was the two-time defending champion, and he won the title for the third straight year, defeating Marcos Baghdatis in the final, 6–3, 6–3.

== Seeds ==
The top four seeds receive a bye into the second round.

1. (United States) John Isner (champion)
2. (Canada) Vasek Pospisil (quarterfinals)
3. (United States) Jack Sock (second round)
4. (France) Adrian Mannarino (second round)
5. (Cyprus) Marcos Baghdatis (final)
6. (United States) Steve Johnson (second round)
7. (Luxembourg) Gilles Müller (semifinals)
8. (Germany) Benjamin Becker (second round)

== Draw ==
=== Key ===
- Q = Qualifier
- WC = Wild card
- LL = Lucky loser
- Alt = Alternate
- SE = Special exempt
- PR = Protected ranking
- ITF = ITF entry
- JE = Junior exempt
- w/o = Walkover
- r = Retired
- d = Defaulted
- SR = Special ranking

=== Finals ===
Semifinals
1	(United States) John Isner	4	6	7
Q	(United States) Denis Kudla	6	2	5
7	(Luxembourg) Gilles Müller	7^{7}	3	6^{4}
5	(Cyprus) Marcos Baghdatis	6^{4}	6	7^{7}

Final
1	(United States) John Isner	6	6
5	(Cyprus) Marcos Baghdatis	3	3

=== Top half ===
First round
WC	(United States) C Eubanks	2	2
PR	(Czech Republic) R Štěpánek	6	6
(Lithuania) R Berankis	6	6
(United States) T Smyczek	4	4
(Slovakia) L Lacko	1	7^{7}	2
6	(United States) S Johnson	6	6^{3}	6
Q	(United States) D Kudla	3	6	7^{7}
WC	(United States) R Harrison	6	4	6^{5}
(Israel) D Sela	6	6
PR	(United States) M Fish	4	4
SE	(Germany) M Berrer	5	0^{r}
8	(Germany) B Becker	7	0

Second round
1	(United States) J Isner	7^{7}	7^{9}
PR	(Czech Republic) R Štěpánek	6^{3}	6^{7}
(Lithuania) R Berankis	6	6
6	(United States) S Johnson	4	2
3	(United States) J Sock	6^{6}	3
Q	(United States) D Kudla	7^{8}	6
(Israel) D Sela	7	6
8	(Germany) B Becker	5	3

Quarterfinals
1	(United States) J Isner	7^{7}	6
(Lithuania) R Berankis	6^{5}	4
Q	(United States) D Kudla	7	6
(Israel) D Sela	5	0

Semifinals
1	(United States) J Isner	4	6	7
Q	(United States) D Kudla	6	2	5

=== Bottom half ===
First round
7	(Luxembourg) G Müller	6	6
(United States) D Young	2	1
Q	(India) S Devvarman	1	6	4
Q	(United States) J Donaldson	6	3	6
(Japan) G Soeda	5	7^{7}	6
(Ukraine) A Dolgopolov	7	6^{5}	3
5	(Cyprus) M Baghdatis	6	6
Q	(United States) A Krajicek	4	0
(Australia) S Groth	7^{7}	6
WC	(United States) F Tiafoe	6^{3}	4
(Chinese Taipei) Y-h Lu	6	7^{14}
(Tunisia) M Jaziri	1	6^{12}

Second round
7	(Luxembourg) G Müller	6	6
Q	(United States) J Donaldson	3	2
(Japan) G Soeda	6	6
4	(France) A Mannarino	2	4
5	(Cyprus) M Baghdatis	7	3	6
(Australia) S Groth	5	6	3
(Chinese Taipei) Y-h Lu	4	7^{7}	4
2	(Canada) V Pospisil	6	6^{3}	6

Quarterfinals
7	(Luxembourg) G Müller	7	6
(Japan) G Soeda	5	1
5	(Cyprus) M Baghdatis	6	7^{7}
2	(Canada) V Pospisil	4	6^{5}

Semifinals
7	(Luxembourg) G Müller	7^{7}	3	6^{4}
5	(Cyprus) M Baghdatis	6^{4}	6	7^{7}

== Qualifying ==
=== Seeds ===
1. (United States) Denis Kudla (qualified)
2. (Argentina) Guido Pella (qualifying competition)
3. (United States) Austin Krajicek (qualified)
4. (Australia) Matthew Ebden (second round, retired)
5. (Australia) John-Patrick Smith (second round)
6. (India) Somdev Devvarman (qualified)
7. (Australia) Marinko Matosevic (qualifying competition)
8. (Japan) Yūichi Sugita (qualifying competition)

=== Qualifiers ===
1. (United States) Denis Kudla
2. (United States) Jared Donaldson
3. (United States) Austin Krajicek
4. (India) Somdev Devvarman

=== Qualifying draw ===
==== First qualifier ====
First round				Second round				Qualifying competition
				1	(United States) Denis Kudla	6	6
WC	(United States) Trent Bryde	7^{7}	6	WC	(United States) Trent Bryde	1	1
	(Romania) Cătălin-Ionuț Gârd	6^{4}	2					1	(United States) Denis Kudla	7	6
	(United States) Andrew Carter	w/o						7	(Australia) Marinko Matosevic	5	2
	(Argentina) Matías Castro				(United States) Andrew Carter	3	2
				7	(Australia) Marinko Matosevic	6	6

==== Second qualifier ====
First round				Second round					Qualifying competition
				2	(Argentina) Guido Pella	6	7^{7}
(United States) Evan Song	6	6			(United States) Evan Song	2	6^{5}
(Zimbabwe) Takanyi Garanganga	4	1							2	(Argentina) Guido Pella	2	6^{6}
(United States) Jared Donaldson	6^{5}	6	6							(United States) Jared Donaldson	6	7^{8}
(Portugal) Gastão Elias	7^{7}	3	3		(United States) Jared Donaldson	6^{5}	7^{7}	6
				5	(Australia) John-Patrick Smith	7^{7}	6^{3}	4

==== Third qualifier ====
First round
(Kazakhstan) Evgeny Korolev	6	2	7^{7}
(Mexico) Antonio Ruiz-Rosales	2	6	6^{3}
WC	(United States) Tommy Paul	6	7^{11}
WC	(United States) Walker Duncan	3	6^{9}
(United States) Kevin King	4	6	3
8	(Japan) Yūichi Sugita	6	3	6

Second round
3	(United States) Austin Krajicek	6	6
(Kazakhstan) Evgeny Korolev	3	3
WC	(United States) Tommy Paul	3	3
8	(Japan) Yūichi Sugita	6	6

Qualifying competition
3	(United States) Austin Krajicek	6	6
8	(Japan) Yūichi Sugita	2	1

==== Fourth qualifier ====
First round				Second round				Qualifying competition
				4	(Australia) Matthew Ebden	5	2^{r}
WC	(United States) Reilly Opelka	4	4		(Japan) Shuichi Sekiguchi	7	5
	(Japan) Shuichi Sekiguchi	6	6						(Japan) Shuichi Sekiguchi	3	3
	(Philippines) Treat Huey	7^{10}	6					6	(India) Somdev Devvarman	6	6
	(United States) Ryan Haviland	6^{8}	3		(Philippines) Treat Huey	5	3
				6	(India) Somdev Devvarman	7	6
