= 2018 Brisbane International – Men's doubles =

Men's doubles
- 2018 Brisbane International

Final
- Champions: (Finland) Henri Kontinen (Australia) John Peers
- Runners-up: (Argentina) Leonardo Mayer (Argentina) Horacio Zeballos
- Score: 3–6, 6–3, [10–2]

Details
- Draw: 16
- Seeds: 4

Events
Singles	men	women
Doubles	men	women
- Brisbane International

Thanasi Kokkinakis and Jordan Thompson were the defending champions, but Kokkinakis chose to compete in the Hopman Cup instead. Thompson played alongside Lleyton Hewitt, but lost in the first round to Grigor Dimitrov and Ryan Harrison.

The first-seeded team of Henri Kontinen and John Peers won the title, defeating Leonardo Mayer and Horacio Zeballos in the final, 3–6, 6–3, [10–2].

== Seeds ==
1. (Finland) Henri Kontinen / (Australia) John Peers (champion)
2. (Brazil) Marcelo Demoliner / (New Zealand) Michael Venus (quarterfinals)
3. (Mexico) Santiago González / (Chile) Julio Peralta (first round)
4. (New Zealand) Marcus Daniell / (United Kingdom) Dominic Inglot (first round)

== Draw ==
Key

- Q = Qualifier
- WC = Wild card
- LL = Lucky loser
- Alt = Alternate
- ITF = ITF entry
- PR = Protected ranking
- SR = Special ranking
- SE = Special exempt
- JE = Junior exempt
- JR = Junior Accelerator Programme entrant
- CO = College Accelerator Programme entrant
- NG = Next Gen Accelerator Program entrant
- w/o = Walkover
- r = Retired
- d = Defaulted

=== Draw ===
First round
1	(Finland) H Kontinen (Australia) J Peers	7^{7}	6
(Canada) M Raonic (Canada) D Shapovalov	6^{3}	4
PR	(Serbia) I Bozoljac (Bosnia and Herzegovina) D Džumhur	1	2
PR	(Australia) M Ebden (Australia) J Millman	6	6
4	(New Zealand) M Daniell (United Kingdom) D Inglot	6	1	[7]
(Australia) N Kyrgios (Australia) M Reid	4	6	[10]
WC	(Australia) L Hewitt (Australia) J Thompson	3	6	[5]
(Bulgaria) G Dimitrov (United States) R Harrison	6	1	[10]
(Netherlands) W Koolhof (New Zealand) A Sitak	6	6
(Philippines) T Huey (France) F Martin	3	2
(United States) S Johnson (Luxembourg) G Müller	7^{7}	4	[11]
3	(Mexico) S González (Chile) J Peralta	6^{2}	6	[9]
(Argentina) D Schwartzman (Germany) M Zverev	2	0
(Argentina) L Mayer (Argentina) H Zeballos	6	6
(United States) N Monroe (Australia) J-P Smith	6	3	[5]
2	(Brazil) M Demoliner (New Zealand) M Venus	4	6	[10]

Quarterfinals
1	(Finland) H Kontinen (Australia) J Peers	6	6
PR	(Australia) M Ebden (Australia) J Millman	4	3
(Australia) N Kyrgios (Australia) M Reid	6^{2}	6^{3}
(Bulgaria) G Dimitrov (United States) R Harrison	7^{7}	7^{7}
(Netherlands) W Koolhof (New Zealand) A Sitak	7^{8}	7
(United States) S Johnson (Luxembourg) G Müller	6^{6}	5
(Argentina) L Mayer (Argentina) H Zeballos	7^{7}	6^{5}	[13]
2	(Brazil) M Demoliner (New Zealand) M Venus	6^{1}	7^{7}	[11]

Semifinals
1	(Finland) H Kontinen (Australia) J Peers	w/o
(Bulgaria) G Dimitrov (United States) R Harrison
(Netherlands) W Koolhof (New Zealand) A Sitak	6	1	[6]
(Argentina) L Mayer (Argentina) H Zeballos	4	6	[10]

Final
1	(Finland) H Kontinen (Australia) J Peers	3	6	[10]
(Argentina) L Mayer (Argentina) H Zeballos	6	3	[2]
