= 2015 BB&T Atlanta Open – Doubles =

Doubles
- 2015 BB&T Atlanta Open

Final
- Champions: (United States) Bob Bryan (United States) Mike Bryan
- Runners-up: (United Kingdom) Colin Fleming (Luxembourg) Gilles Müller
- Score: 4–6, 7–6^{(7–2)}, [10–4]

Events
Singles	Doubles
- BB&T Atlanta Open

Vasek Pospisil and Jack Sock were the defending champions, but lost in the first round to Colin Fleming and Gilles Müller.
Bob and Mike Bryan won the title, defeating Fleming and Müller in the final, 4–6, 7–6^{(7–2)}, [10–4].

== Seeds ==
1. (United States) Bob Bryan / (United States) Mike Bryan (champions)
2. (Canada) Vasek Pospisil / (United States) Jack Sock (first round)
3. (United States) Eric Butorac / (New Zealand) Artem Sitak (semifinals)
4. (Croatia) Mate Pavić / (New Zealand) Michael Venus (first round)

== Draw ==
Key

- Q = Qualifier
- WC = Wild card
- LL = Lucky loser
- Alt = Alternate
- ITF = ITF entry
- PR = Protected ranking
- SR = Special ranking
- SE = Special exempt
- JE = Junior exempt
- JR = Junior Accelerator Programme entrant
- CO = College Accelerator Programme entrant
- NG = Next Gen Accelerator Program entrant
- w/o = Walkover
- r = Retired
- d = Defaulted

=== Draw ===
First round
1	(United States) B Bryan (United States) M Bryan	6	6
(Australia) S Groth (Australia) C Guccione	2	1
(Philippines) T Huey (United States) S Johnson	6	6
(France) F Martin (India) P Raja	1	3
4	(Croatia) M Pavić (New Zealand) M Venus	2	6	[5]
WC	(United States) C Eubanks (United States) D Young	6	3	[10]
(New Zealand) M Daniell (Brazil) M Demoliner	3	6	[11]
(United States) A Krajicek (United States) N Monroe	6	4	[13]
(Chinese Taipei) Y-h Lu (United Kingdom) J Marray	6^{2}	4
WC	(United States) M Fish (United States) A Roddick	7^{7}	6
(Australia) M Ebden (France) A Mannarino	2	0
3	(United States) E Butorac (New Zealand) A Sitak	6	6
(Germany) B Becker (Slovakia) L Lacko	6^{3}	3
(Cyprus) M Baghdatis (Tunisia) M Jaziri	7^{7}	6
(United Kingdom) C Fleming (Luxembourg) G Müller	6	4	[10]
2	(Canada) V Pospisil (United States) J Sock	4	6	[6]

Quarterfinals
1	(United States) B Bryan (United States) M Bryan	7^{7}	7^{7}
(Philippines) T Huey (United States) S Johnson	6^{5}	6^{4}
WC	(United States) C Eubanks (United States) D Young	4	7^{7}	[10]
(United States) A Krajicek (United States) N Monroe	6	6^{5}	[2]
WC	(United States) M Fish (United States) A Roddick	5	2
3	(United States) E Butorac (New Zealand) A Sitak	7	6
(Cyprus) M Baghdatis (Tunisia) M Jaziri	6^{8}	2
(United Kingdom) C Fleming (Luxembourg) G Müller	7^{10}	6

Semifinals
1	(United States) B Bryan (United States) M Bryan	6	6
WC	(United States) C Eubanks (United States) D Young	2	4
3	(United States) E Butorac (New Zealand) A Sitak	3	7	[3]
(United Kingdom) C Fleming (Luxembourg) G Müller	6	5	[10]

Final
1	(United States) B Bryan (United States) M Bryan	4	7^{7}	[10]
(United Kingdom) C Fleming (Luxembourg) G Müller	6	6^{2}	[4]
