= 2016 BB&T Atlanta Open – Singles =

Singles
- 2016 BB&T Atlanta Open

Final
- Champion: (Australia) Nick Kyrgios
- Runner-up: (United States) John Isner
- Score: 7–6^{(7–3)}, 7–6^{(7–4)}

Details
- Draw: 28 (4 Q / 3 WC )
- Seeds: 8

Events
Singles	Doubles
← 2015 ·	BB&T Atlanta Open	· 2017 →

John Isner was the three-time defending champion, but lost in the final to Nick Kyrgios, 6–7^{(3–7)}, 6–7^{(4–7)}. Kyrgios was the first non-American winner in the tournament's history.

== Seeds ==
The top four seeds receive a bye into the second round.

1. (United States) John Isner (final)
2. (Australia) Nick Kyrgios (champion)
3. (South Africa) Kevin Anderson (second round)
4. (Ukraine) Alexandr Dolgopolov (second round)
5. (Spain) Fernando Verdasco (quarterfinals)
6. (Spain) Guillermo García López (first round)
7. (United States) Donald Young (quarterfinals)
8. (United States) Taylor Fritz (quarterfinals)

== Draw ==
=== Key ===
- Q = Qualifier
- WC = Wild card
- LL = Lucky loser
- Alt = Alternate
- SE = Special exempt
- PR = Protected ranking
- ITF = ITF entry
- JE = Junior exempt
- w/o = Walkover
- r = Retired
- d = Defaulted
- SR = Special ranking

=== Finals ===
Semifinals
1	(United States) John Isner	6^{5}	6	6
WC	(United States) Reilly Opelka	7^{7}	4	2
(Japan) Yoshihito Nishioka	3	6	3
2	(Australia) Nick Kyrgios	6	3	6

Final
1	(United States) John Isner	6^{3}	6^{4}
2	(Australia) Nick Kyrgios	7^{7}	7^{7}

=== Top half ===
First round
(France) A Mannarino	6	3	7^{7}
Q	(Germany) M Zverev	3	6	6^{5}
(Netherlands) I Sijsling	1	6^{2}
(United States) B Fratangelo	6	7^{7}
WC	(United States) A Smith	2	2
8	(United States) T Fritz	6	6
Q	(United States) C Eubanks	6^{9}	6^{5}
WC	(United States) R Opelka	7^{11}	7^{7}
LL	(Brazil) T Monteiro	7	6^{5}	3
(United States) T Smyczek	5	7^{7}	6
Q	(United States) A Krajicek	6	6^{10}	5
7	(United States) D Young	3	7^{12}	7

Second round
1	(United States) J Isner	6	6
(France) A Mannarino	4	0
(United States) B Fratangelo	6	3	2
8	(United States) T Fritz	4	6	6
3	(South Africa) K Anderson	7^{7}	3	5
WC	(United States) R Opelka	6^{5}	6	7
(United States) T Smyczek	6	6^{1}	3
7	(United States) D Young	4	7^{7}	6

Quarterfinals
1	(United States) J Isner	7	6
8	(United States) T Fritz	5	4
WC	(United States) R Opelka	6	6
7	(United States) D Young	4	4

Semifinals
1	(United States) J Isner	6^{5}	6	6
WC	(United States) R Opelka	7^{7}	4	2

=== Bottom half ===
First round
6	(Spain) G García López	3	7^{7}	4
(Argentina) H Zeballos	6	6^{5}	6
(Ukraine) S Stakhovsky	6^{7}	6^{2}
LL	(Germany) T Kamke	7^{9}	7^{7}
(United Kingdom) D Evans	2	7^{7}	6^{4}
(Japan) Y Nishioka	6	6^{2}	7^{7}
5	(Spain) F Verdasco	7^{7}	6
(Serbia) D Lajović	6^{2}	4
PR	(France) J Benneteau	6	6
Q	(Australia) J-P Smith	4	2
(Australia) S Groth	2	4
WC	(United States) J Donaldson	6	6

Second round
(Argentina) H Zeballos	6	6
LL	(Germany) T Kamke	1	4
(Japan) Y Nishioka	6	2	6
4	(Ukraine) A Dolgopolov	3	6	1
5	(Spain) F Verdasco	6	6
PR	(France) J Benneteau	1	3
WC	(United States) J Donaldson	6^{4}	3
2	(Australia) N Kyrgios	7^{7}	6

Quarterfinals
(Argentina) H Zeballos	4	4
(Japan) Y Nishioka	6	6
5	(Spain) F Verdasco	4	7^{7}	3
2	(Australia) N Kyrgios	6	6^{5}	6

Semifinals
(Japan) Y Nishioka	3	6	3
2	(Australia) N Kyrgios	6	3	6

== Qualifying ==
=== Seeds ===
1. (Brazil) Thiago Monteiro (qualifying competition, lucky loser)
2. (Germany) Tobias Kamke (qualifying competition, lucky loser)
3. (United States) Austin Krajicek (qualified)
4. (Germany) Mischa Zverev (qualified)
5. (Australia) James Duckworth (qualifying competition)
6. (United States) Tommy Paul (first round)
7. (Australia) John-Patrick Smith (qualified)
8. (United States) Alexander Sarkissian (first round)

=== Qualifiers ===
1. (United States) Christopher Eubanks
2. (Australia) John-Patrick Smith
3. (United States) Austin Krajicek
4. (Germany) Mischa Zverev

=== Lucky losers ===
1. (Brazil) Thiago Monteiro
2. (Germany) Tobias Kamke

=== Qualifying draw ===
==== First qualifier ====
First round
1	(Brazil) Thiago Monteiro	6	6
WC	(United States) Trent Bryde	0	2
WC	(United States) Christopher Eubanks	6	7
6	(United States) Tommy Paul	2	5

Qualifying competition
1	(Brazil) Thiago Monteiro	4	5
WC	(United States) Christopher Eubanks	6	7

==== Second qualifier ====
First round
2	(Germany) Tobias Kamke	6	6
(United States) Michael Mmoh	4	2
(United States) Andrew Carter	3	3
7	(Australia) John-Patrick Smith	6	6

Qualifying competition
2	(Germany) Tobias Kamke	6^{4}	3
7	(Australia) John-Patrick Smith	7^{7}	6

==== Third qualifier ====
First round
3	(United States) Austin Krajicek	7^{8}	4	6
(United Kingdom) Lloyd Glasspool	6^{6}	6	4
(Argentina) Juan Ignacio Londero	2	2
5	(Australia) James Duckworth	6	6

Qualifying competition
3	(United States) Austin Krajicek	3	7^{7}	7^{7}
5	(Australia) James Duckworth	6	6^{5}	6^{5}

==== Fourth qualifier ====
First round
4	(Germany) Mischa Zverev	6	6
(Australia) Matt Reid	4	2
(United States) Nicolas Meister	5	6	6
8	(United States) Alexander Sarkissian	7	3	4

Qualifying competition
4	(Germany) Mischa Zverev	7^{7}	7
(United States) Nicolas Meister	6^{5}	5
