= 2018 Brisbane International – Men's singles =

Men's singles
- 2018 Brisbane International

Final
- Champion: (Australia) Nick Kyrgios
- Runner-up: (United States) Ryan Harrison
- Score: 6–4, 6–2

Details
- Draw: 28 (4 Q / 3 WC )
- Seeds: 8

Events
Singles	men	women
Doubles	men	women
- Brisbane International

Grigor Dimitrov was the defending champion, but lost in the semifinals to Nick Kyrgios.

Kyrgios went on to win the title, defeating Ryan Harrison in the final, 6–4, 6–2.

== Seeds ==
The top four seeds receive a bye into the second round.

1. (Bulgaria) Grigor Dimitrov (semifinals)
2. (United Kingdom) Andy Murray (withdrew due to injury)
3. (Australia) Nick Kyrgios (champion)
4. (Canada) Milos Raonic (second round)
5. (Luxembourg) Gilles Müller (first round)
6. (Argentina) Diego Schwartzman (first round)
7. (Bosnia and Herzegovina) Damir Džumhur (first round)
8. (Germany) Mischa Zverev (second round)

== Draw ==
=== Finals ===
Semifinals
1	(Bulgaria) Grigor Dimitrov	6	1	4
3	(Australia) Nick Kyrgios	3	6	6
WC	(Australia) Alex de Minaur	6	6^{5}	4
(United States) Ryan Harrison	4	7^{7}	6

Final
3	(Australia) Nick Kyrgios	6	6
(United States) Ryan Harrison	4	2

=== Top half ===
First round
Q	(Canada) P Polansky	6^{4}	0
WC	(Australia) J Millman	7^{7}	6
(Canada) D Shapovalov	7^{7}	6^{4}	4
(United Kingdom) K Edmund	6^{5}	7^{7}	6
(South Korea) H Chung	6	7^{7}
5	(Luxembourg) G Müller	3	6^{1}
(United States) F Tiafoe	3	2
(Australia) M Ebden	6	6
Q	(United States) E Escobedo	3	4
(Argentina) H Zeballos	6	6
(Ukraine) A Dolgopolov	6	7^{7}
6	(Argentina) D Schwartzman	4	6^{3}

Second round
1	(Bulgaria) G Dimitrov	4	7^{10}	6
WC	(Australia) J Millman	6	6^{8}	3
(United Kingdom) K Edmund	7^{7}	5	6
(South Korea) H Chung	6^{3}	7	4
3	(Australia) N Kyrgios	6^{3}	7^{7}	6
(Australia) M Ebden	7^{7}	6^{5}	2
(Argentina) H Zeballos	1	2
(Ukraine) A Dolgopolov	6	6

Quarterfinals
1	(Bulgaria) G Dimitrov	6	6^{3}	6
(United Kingdom) K Edmund	3	7^{7}	4
3	(Australia) N Kyrgios	1	6	6
(Ukraine) A Dolgopolov	6	3	4

Semifinals
1	(Bulgaria) G Dimitrov	6	1	4
3	(Australia) N Kyrgios	3	6	6

=== Bottom half ===
First round
8	(Germany) M Zverev	6	7
Q	(Australia) J-P Smith	4	5
(Argentina) F Delbonis	3	4
Q	(United States) M Mmoh	6	6
(United States) S Johnson	6^{7}	4
WC	(Australia) A de Minaur	7^{9}	6
7	(Bosnia and Herzegovina) D Džumhur	7^{7}	3	2
(Uzbekistan) D Istomin	6^{4}	6	6
(United States) J Donaldson	6	6
WC	(Australia) J Thompson	2	4
(United States) R Harrison	6	3	6
(Argentina) L Mayer	4	6	2

Second round
8	(Germany) M Zverev	2	7	4
Q	(United States) M Mmoh	6	5	6
WC	(Australia) A de Minaur	6	6
4	(Canada) M Raonic	4	4
(Uzbekistan) D Istomin	7^{7}	6
(United States) J Donaldson	6^{5}	2
(United States) R Harrison	6^{5}	6	6
LL	(Germany) Y Hanfmann	7^{7}	4	2

Quarterfinals
Q	(United States) M Mmoh	4	0
WC	(Australia) A de Minaur	6	6
(Uzbekistan) D Istomin	6^{6}	2^{r}
(United States) R Harrison	7^{8}	4

Semifinals
WC	(Australia) A de Minaur	6	6^{5}	4
(United States) R Harrison	4	7^{7}	6

== Qualifying ==
=== Seeds ===
1. (Kazakhstan) Alexander Bublik (first round)
2. (Germany) Yannick Hanfmann (qualifying competition; lucky loser)
3. (United States) Ernesto Escobedo (qualified)
4. (France) Quentin Halys (first round)
5. (Canada) Peter Polansky (qualified)
6. (Austria) Sebastian Ofner (qualifying competition)
7. (Argentina) Renzo Olivo (first round)
8. (Slovakia) Jozef Kovalík (qualifying competition)

=== Qualifiers ===
1. (Australia) John-Patrick Smith
2. (Canada) Peter Polansky
3. (United States) Ernesto Escobedo
4. (United States) Michael Mmoh

=== Lucky loser ===
1. (Germany) Yannick Hanfmann

=== Qualifying draw ===
==== First qualifier ====
First round
1	(Kazakhstan) Alexander Bublik	4	4
Alt	(Australia) John-Patrick Smith	6	6
(Croatia) Viktor Galović	4	6	6
7	(Argentina) Renzo Olivo	6	3	2

Qualifying competition
Alt	(Australia) John-Patrick Smith	6	3	7^{7}
(Croatia) Viktor Galović	4	6	6^{2}

==== Second qualifier ====
First round
2	(Germany) Yannick Hanfmann	6	7^{9}
WC	(Australia) Sam Groth	4	6^{7}
(Canada) Filip Peliwo	2	2
5	(Canada) Peter Polansky	6	6

Qualifying competition
2	(Germany) Yannick Hanfmann	1	6	3
5	(Canada) Peter Polansky	6	3	6

==== Third qualifier ====
First round
3	(United States) Ernesto Escobedo	6	4	6
WC	(Australia) James Duckworth	2	6	4
(United States) Denis Kudla	6^{5}	4
8	(Slovakia) Jozef Kovalík	7^{7}	6

Qualifying competition
3	(United States) Ernesto Escobedo	6	7^{7}
8	(Slovakia) Jozef Kovalík	2	6^{4}

==== Fourth qualifier ====
First round
4	(France) Quentin Halys	4	4
(United States) Michael Mmoh	6	6
(El Salvador) Marcelo Arévalo	6	6^{3}	2
6	(Austria) Sebastian Ofner	2	7^{7}	6

Qualifying competition
(United States) Michael Mmoh	6	6
6	(Austria) Sebastian Ofner	4	3
