= 2015 BB&T Atlanta Open =

- Date: July 27 – August 2
- Edition: 28th
- Surface: Hard / outdoor
- Location: Atlanta, United States
- Venue: Atlantic Station

Champions

Singles
- (United States) John Isner

Doubles
- (United States) Bob Bryan / (United States) Mike Bryan
- Atlanta Open

The 2015 BB&T Atlanta Open was a professional tennis tournament played on hard courts. It was the 28th edition of the tournament, and part of the 2015 ATP World Tour and the 2015 US Open Series. It took place at Atlantic Station in Atlanta, United States between July 27 and August 2, 2015. It was the first men's event of the 2015 US Open Series. First-seeded John Isner won the singles title.

== Finals ==
=== Singles ===
- (United States) John Isner defeated (Cyprus) Marcos Baghdatis, 6–3, 6–3

=== Doubles ===
- (United States) Bob Bryan / (United States) Mike Bryan defeated (United Kingdom) Colin Fleming / (Luxembourg) Gilles Müller, 4–6, 7–6^{(7–2)}, [10–4]

== Singles main-draw entrants ==
=== Seeds ===
Country	Player	Rank^{1}	Seed
USA	John Isner	18	1
CAN	Vasek Pospisil	30	2
USA	Jack Sock	31	3
FRA	Adrian Mannarino	33	4
CYP	Marcos Baghdatis	45	5
USA	Steve Johnson	46	6
LUX	Gilles Müller	52	7
GER	Benjamin Becker	53	8

- ^{1} Rankings are as of July 20, 2015

=== Other entrants ===
The following players received wildcards into the singles main draw:

- (United States) Christopher Eubanks
- (United States) Ryan Harrison
- (United States) Frances Tiafoe

The following player received entry as a special exempt:

- (Germany) Michael Berrer

The following players received entry from the qualifying draw:

- (India) Somdev Devvarman
- (United States) Jared Donaldson
- (United States) Austin Krajicek
- (United States) Denis Kudla

=== Withdrawals ===
Before the tournament

- (South Africa) Kevin Anderson →replaced by Go Soeda
- (South Korea) Chung Hyeon →replaced by Dudi Sela
- (Serbia) Janko Tipsarević →replaced by Ričardas Berankis

=== Retirements ===
- (Germany) Michael Berrer

== ATP doubles main-draw entrants ==
=== Seeds ===
Country	Player	Country	Player	Rank^{1}	Seed
USA	Bob Bryan	USA	Mike Bryan	2	1
CAN	Vasek Pospisil	USA	Jack Sock	29	2
USA	Eric Butorac	NZL	Artem Sitak	83	3
CRO	Mate Pavić	NZL	Michael Venus	102	4

- ^{1} Rankings are as of July 20, 2015

=== Other entrants ===
The following pairs received wildcards into the doubles main draw:

- (United States) Christopher Eubanks / (United States) Donald Young
- (United States) Mardy Fish / (United States) Andy Roddick
