= Zack Kennedy =

American tennis player

- Country (sports): United States
- Residence: Atlanta, United States
- Born: 15 May 1995 (age 31) Atlanta, United States
- Prize money: $2,720

Singles
- Career record: 0–0 (at ATP Tour level, Grand Slam level, and in Davis Cup)
- Career titles: 0

Doubles
- Career record: 1–1 (at ATP Tour level, Grand Slam level, and in Davis Cup)
- Career titles: 0
- Highest ranking: No. 818 (12 September 2016)
- Current ranking: No. 842 (28 November 2016)
- Last updated on: 28 November 2016.

Zack Kennedy (born 15 May 1995) is an American tennis player.

Kennedy has a career high ATP doubles ranking of 818 achieved on 12 September 2016.

Kennedy made his ATP main draw debut at the 2016 BB&T Atlanta Open in the doubles draw partnering Christopher Eubanks. Kennedy played college tennis at Georgia State University.
