= 2021 National Bank Open – Men's singles =

Men's singles
- 2021 National Bank Open

Final
- Champion: (Russia) Daniil Medvedev
- Runner-up: (United States) Reilly Opelka
- Score: 6–4, 6–3

Details
- Draw: 48 (6 Q / 3 WC )
- Seeds: 16

Events
Singles	men	women
Doubles	men	women
← 2019 ·	National Bank Open	· 2022 →

Daniil Medvedev defeated Reilly Opelka in the final, 6–4, 6–3 to win the men's singles tennis title at the 2021 Canadian Open. It was his fourth ATP Masters 1000 title and 12th career title. Opelka was contesting his maiden Masters 1000 final.

Rafael Nadal was the two-time reigning champion from when the event was last held in 2019 and was vying to tie Ivan Lendl's record of six Canadian Open titles, but did not participate due to a foot injury.

== Seeds ==
All seeds received a bye into the second round.

1. (Russia) Daniil Medvedev (champion)
2. (Spain) Rafael Nadal (withdrew due to left foot injury)
3. (Greece) Stefanos Tsitsipas (semifinals)
4. (Russia) Andrey Rublev (third round)
5. (Canada) Denis Shapovalov (second round)
6. (Norway) Casper Ruud (quarterfinals)
7. (Poland) Hubert Hurkacz (quarterfinals)
8. (Argentina) Diego Schwartzman (third round)

9. (Canada) Félix Auger-Aliassime (second round)
10. (Spain) Roberto Bautista Agut (quarterfinals)
11. (France) Gaël Monfils (quarterfinals)
12. (Australia) Alex de Minaur (second round)
13. (Chile) Cristian Garín (second round)
14. (Bulgaria) Grigor Dimitrov (second round)
15. (Russia) Aslan Karatsev (second round)
16. (Italy) Jannik Sinner (second round)

Click on the seed number of a player to go to their draw section.

== Draw ==
=== Key ===
- Q = Qualifier
- WC = Wild card
- LL = Lucky loser
- Alt = Alternate
- SE = Special exempt
- PR = Protected ranking
- ITF = ITF entry
- JE = Junior exempt
- w/o = Walkover
- r = Retired
- d = Defaulted
- SR = Special ranking

=== Finals ===
Quarterfinals
1	(Russia) Daniil Medvedev	2	7^{8}	7^{7}
7	(Poland) Hubert Hurkacz	6	6^{6}	6^{5}
(United States) John Isner	7^{7}	6
11	(France) Gaël Monfils	6^{5}	4
6	(Norway) Casper Ruud	1	4
3	(Greece) Stefanos Tsitsipas	6	6
10	(Spain) Roberto Bautista Agut	3	6^{1}
(United States) Reilly Opelka	6	7^{7}

Semifinals
1	(Russia) Daniil Medvedev	6	6
(United States) John Isner	2	2
3	(Greece) Stefanos Tsitsipas	7^{7}	6^{4}	4
(United States) Reilly Opelka	6^{2}	7^{7}	6

Final
1	(Russia) Daniil Medvedev	6	6
(United States) Reilly Opelka	4	3

=== Top half ===
==== Section 1 ====
First round
(United Kingdom) D Evans	4	4
(Kazakhstan) A Bublik	6	6
Q	(Australia) J Duckworth	7^{7}	6
(United States) T Fritz	6^{2}	3
WC	(United States) J Brooksby	6	0	4
(Georgia (country)) N Basilashvili	2	6	6
(Serbia) M Kecmanović	4	7^{7}	2
PR	(Japan) K Nishikori	6	6^{5}	6

Second round
1	(Russia) D Medvedev	4	6	6
(Kazakhstan) A Bublik	6	3	4
Q	(Australia) J Duckworth	6	6
16	(Italy) J Sinner	3	4
12	(Australia) A de Minaur	1	1
(Georgia (country)) N Basilashvili	6	6
PR	(Japan) K Nishikori
7	(Poland) H Hurkacz	w/o

Third round
1	(Russia) D Medvedev	6	6
Q	(Australia) J Duckworth	2	4
(Georgia (country)) N Basilashvili	7^{9}	4	4
7	(Poland) H Hurkacz	6^{7}	6	6

Quarterfinals
1	(Russia) D Medvedev	2	7^{8}	7^{7}
7	(Poland) H Hurkacz	6	6^{6}	6^{5}

==== Section 2 ====
First round
(Germany) J-L Struff	7^{7}	2	4
(Italy) F Fognini	6^{2}	6	6
(United States) J Isner	6	6
(Spain) A Davidovich Fokina	4	1
(Australia) J Millman	6	7^{7}
Q	(Lithuania) R Berankis	3	6^{4}
Q	(Japan) Y Nishioka	4	3
LL	(United States) F Tiafoe	6	6

Second round
4	(Russia) A Rublev	7^{7}	6
(Italy) F Fognini	6^{4}	3
(United States) J Isner	4	6	6
13	(Chile) C Garín	6	3	4
11	(France) G Monfils	3	6	6
(Australia) J Millman	6	3	4
LL	(United States) F Tiafoe	6	6
5	(Canada) D Shapovalov	1	4

Third round
4	(Russia) A Rublev	5	6^{5}
(United States) J Isner	7	7^{7}
11	(France) G Monfils	6	7^{7}
LL	(United States) F Tiafoe	1	6^{2}

Quarterfinals
(United States) J Isner	7^{7}	6
11	(France) G Monfils	6^{5}	4

=== Bottom half ===
==== Section 3 ====
First round
(Spain) A Ramos Viñolas	2	6	3
(Croatia) M Čilić	6	4	6
(Serbia) D Lajović	3	6	6
Q	(Finland) E Ruusuvuori	6	3	3
(United Kingdom) C Norrie	4	7	4
(Russia) K Khachanov	6	5	6
(Italy) L Sonego	3	4
(France) U Humbert	6	6

Second round
6	(Norway) C Ruud	6	3	6
(Croatia) M Čilić	3	6	3
(Serbia) D Lajović	7	6
9	(Canada) F Auger-Aliassime	5	4
15	(Russia) A Karatsev	6^{7}	4
(Russia) K Khachanov	7^{9}	6
(France) U Humbert	3	7^{15}	1
3	(Greece) S Tsitsipas	6	6^{13}	6

Third round
6	(Norway) C Ruud	6	6
(Serbia) D Lajović	4	3
(Russia) K Khachanov	3	2
3	(Greece) S Tsitsipas	6	6

Quarterfinals
6	(Norway) C Ruud	1	4
3	(Greece) S Tsitsipas	6	6

==== Section 4 ====
First round
(France) B Paire	6	6
SE	(United States) M McDonald	3	4
WC	(Canada) V Pospisil	7^{7}	2	3
Q	(United States) T Paul	6^{5}	6	6
WC	(Australia) N Kyrgios	6	6^{4}	4
(United States) R Opelka	4	7^{7}	6
(South Africa) L Harris	6	6
Q	(Canada) B Schnur	3	2

Second round
8	(Argentina) D Schwartzman	7	6
(France) B Paire	5	1
Q	(United States) T Paul	3	4
10	(Spain) R Bautista Agut	6	6
14	(Bulgaria) G Dimitrov	3	4
(United States) R Opelka	6	6
(South Africa) L Harris	6	6
LL	(Spain) F López	2	3

Third round
8	(Argentina) D Schwartzman	3	6	5
10	(Spain) R Bautista Agut	6	3	7
(United States) R Opelka	4	7^{8}	7^{7}
(South Africa) L Harris	6	6^{6}	6^{4}

Quarterfinals
10	(Spain) R Bautista Agut	3	6^{1}
(United States) R Opelka	6	7^{7}

== Qualifying ==
=== Seeds ===
1. (United States) Frances Tiafoe (qualifying competition, lucky loser)
2. (United States) Tommy Paul (qualified)
3. (Japan) Yoshihito Nishioka (qualified)
4. (Germany) Dominik Koepfer (first round)
5. (Italy) Lorenzo Musetti (removed for exiting Covid-19 bubble)
6. (United States) Marcos Giron (first round)
7. (Finland) Emil Ruusuvuori (qualified)
8. (Australia) Alexei Popyrin (first round)
9. (Australia) James Duckworth (qualified)
10. (Lithuania) Ričardas Berankis (qualified)
11. (Spain) Feliciano López (qualifying competition, lucky loser)
12. (France) Benjamin Bonzi (first round)

=== Qualifiers ===
1. (Finland) Emil Ruusuvuori
2. (United States) Tommy Paul
3. (Japan) Yoshihito Nishioka
4. (Australia) James Duckworth
5. (Lithuania) Ričardas Berankis
6. (Canada) Brayden Schnur

=== Lucky losers ===
1. (United States) Frances Tiafoe
2. (Spain) Feliciano López

=== Qualifying draw ===
==== First qualifier ====
First round
1	(United States) Frances Tiafoe	6	0	6
(United States) J. J. Wolf	2	6	4
WC	(Canada) Steven Diez	3	2
7	(Finland) Emil Ruusuvuori	6	6

Qualifying competition
1	(United States) Frances Tiafoe	1	4
7	(Finland) Emil Ruusuvuori	6	6

==== Second qualifier ====
First round
2	(United States) Tommy Paul	7^{7}	6
WC	(Canada) Liam Draxl	6^{0}	4
(United Kingdom) Liam Broady	5	7^{9}	7^{7}
8	(Australia) Alexei Popyrin	7	6^{7}	6^{2}

Qualifying competition
2	(United States) Tommy Paul	7^{7}	6
(United Kingdom) Liam Broady	6^{3}	3

==== Third qualifier ====
First round
3	(Japan) Yoshihito Nishioka	7^{7}	6
(United States) Michael Mmoh	6^{5}	2
(United States) Maxime Cressy	6^{4}	4
11	(Spain) Feliciano López	7^{7}	6

Qualifying competition
3	(Japan) Yoshihito Nishioka	7	7^{8}
11	(Spain) Feliciano López	5	6^{6}

==== Fourth qualifier ====
First round
4	(Germany) Dominik Koepfer	3	4
WC	(Canada) Peter Polansky	6	6
(Ukraine) Illya Marchenko	1	3
9	(Australia) James Duckworth	6	6

Qualifying competition
WC	(Canada) Peter Polansky	6	1	2
9	(Australia) James Duckworth	4	6	6

==== Fifth qualifier ====
First round
Alt	(Australia) Max Purcell	6^{2}	7^{7}	6^{4}
(Ecuador) Emilio Gómez	7^{7}	6^{2}	7^{7}
(Slovakia) Norbert Gombos	6^{5}	4
10	(Lithuania) Ričardas Berankis	7^{7}	6

Qualifying competition
(Ecuador) Emilio Gómez	4	5
10	(Lithuania) Ričardas Berankis	6	7

==== Sixth qualifier ====
First round
6	(United States) Marcos Giron	2	3
WC	(Canada) Brayden Schnur	6	6
(Colombia) Daniel Elahi Galán	6	2	6
12	(France) Benjamin Bonzi	3	6	2

Qualifying competition
WC	(Canada) Brayden Schnur	7^{9}	6
(Colombia) Daniel Elahi Galán	6^{7}	3
