= 2022 National Bank Open – Men's singles =

Men's singles
- 2022 National Bank Open

Final
- Champion: (Spain) Pablo Carreño Busta
- Runner-up: (Poland) Hubert Hurkacz
- Score: 3–6, 6–3, 6–3

Details
- Draw: 56
- Seeds: 16

Events
Singles	men	women
Doubles	men	women
← 2021 ·	Canadian Open	· 2023 →

Pablo Carreño Busta defeated Hubert Hurkacz in the final, 3–6, 6–3, 6–3 to win the men's singles tennis title at the 2022 Canadian Open. Carreño Busta's first title of the season was also his maiden ATP Masters 1000 title. Hurkacz's defeat in the contest for his second Masters 1000 title was also a career-first loss in a tour-level final after he was bidding to win a sixth title in six finals.

Daniil Medvedev was the defending champion, but lost in the second round to Nick Kyrgios.

For the first time since 1999 Indian Wells, the top three seeds at a Masters 1000 tournament were defeated in their opening matches. Jannik Sinner's loss in the third round also guaranteed a maiden Masters 1000 finalist in the bottom half of the draw, from which Carreño Busta emerged.

== Seeds ==
The top eight seeds receive a bye into the second round.

1. Daniil Medvedev (second round)
2. (Spain) Carlos Alcaraz (second round)
3. (Greece) Stefanos Tsitsipas (second round)
4. (Norway) Casper Ruud (semifinals)
5. Andrey Rublev (second round)
6. (Canada) Félix Auger-Aliassime (quarterfinals)
7. (Italy) Jannik Sinner (third round)
8. (Poland) Hubert Hurkacz (final)
9. (United Kingdom) Cameron Norrie (third round)
10. (United States) Taylor Fritz (third round)
11. (Italy) Matteo Berrettini (first round)
12. (Argentina) Diego Schwartzman (second round)
13. (Croatia) Marin Čilić (third round)
14. (United States) Reilly Opelka (withdrew)
15. (Spain) Roberto Bautista Agut (third round)
16. (Bulgaria) Grigor Dimitrov (second round)
17. (France) Gaël Monfils (third round, retired)

Click on the seed number of a player to go to their draw section.

== Draw ==
=== Key ===
- Q = Qualifier
- WC = Wild card
- LL = Lucky loser
- Alt = Alternate
- SE = Special exempt
- PR = Protected ranking
- ITF = ITF entry
- JE = Junior exempt
- w/o = Walkover
- r = Retired
- d = Defaulted
- SR = Special ranking

=== Finals ===
Quarterfinals
(Australia) Nick Kyrgios	6^{4}	7^{7}	1
8	(Poland) Hubert Hurkacz	7^{7}	6^{5}	6
4	(Norway) Casper Ruud	6	6
6	(Canada) Félix Auger-Aliassime	1	2
(Spain) Pablo Carreño Busta	7^{7}	6
Q	(United Kingdom) Jack Draper	6^{4}	1
(United Kingdom) Dan Evans	1	6	6
(United States) Tommy Paul	6	3	4

Semifinals
8	(Poland) Hubert Hurkacz	5	6	6
4	(Norway) Casper Ruud	7	3	2
(Spain) Pablo Carreño Busta	7	6^{7}	6
(United Kingdom) Dan Evans	5	7^{9}	2

Final
8	(Poland) Hubert Hurkacz	6	3	3
(Spain) Pablo Carreño Busta	3	6	6

=== Top half ===
==== Section 1 ====
First round
(Argentina) S Báez	4	4
(Australia) N Kyrgios	6	6
(Canada) D Shapovalov	5	6^{4}
(Australia) A de Minaur	7	7^{7}
WC	(Canada) A Galarneau	4	5
16	(Bulgaria) G Dimitrov	6	7
12	(Argentina) D Schwartzman	1	6	6
(Spain) A Davidovich Fokina	6	3	4
WC	(Belgium) D Goffin	6^{2}	2
(Spain) A Ramos Viñolas	7^{7}	6
PR	(Switzerland) S Wawrinka	3	6	3
(Finland) E Ruusuvuori	6	3	6

Second round
1	D Medvedev	7^{7}	4	2
(Australia) N Kyrgios	6^{2}	6	6
(Australia) A de Minaur	7^{7}	7
16	(Bulgaria) G Dimitrov	6^{4}	5
12	(Argentina) D Schwartzman	4	2
(Spain) A Ramos Viñolas	6	6
(Finland) E Ruusuvuori	3	7^{7}	2
8	(Poland) H Hurkacz	6	6^{4}	6

Third round
(Australia) N Kyrgios	6	6
(Australia) A de Minaur	2	3
(Spain) A Ramos Viñolas	7^{8}	2	6^{3}
8	(Poland) H Hurkacz	6^{6}	6	7^{7}

Quarterfinals
(Australia) N Kyrgios	6^{4}	7^{7}	1
8	(Poland) H Hurkacz	7^{7}	6^{5}	6

==== Section 2 ====
First round
(Slovakia) A Molčan	7^{7}	6
(United States) M McDonald	6^{1}	4
(Kazakhstan) A Bublik	2	3
(United States) J Brooksby	6	6
Q	(United States) M Giron	6^{5}	3
15	(Spain) R Bautista Agut	7^{7}	6
9	(United Kingdom) C Norrie	6	6
(United States) B Nakashima	4	4
(Serbia) M Kecmanović	1	5
(Netherlands) B van de Zandschulp	6	7
Q	(France) B Paire	2	3
SE	(Japan) Y Nishioka	6	6

Second round
4	(Norway) C Ruud	7^{7}	6
(Slovakia) A Molčan	6^{3}	3
(United States) J Brooksby	5	1
15	(Spain) R Bautista Agut	7	6
9	(United Kingdom) C Norrie	6	6
(Netherlands) B van de Zandschulp	1	2
SE	(Japan) Y Nishioka	6^{6}	4
6	(Canada) F Auger-Aliassime	7^{8}	6

Third round
4	(Norway) C Ruud	6^{4}	7^{7}	6
15	(Spain) R Bautista Agut	7^{7}	6^{4}	4
9	(United Kingdom) C Norrie	3	4
6	(Canada) F Auger-Aliassime	6	6

Quarterfinals
4	(Norway) C Ruud	6	6
6	(Canada) F Auger-Aliassime	1	2

=== Bottom half ===
==== Section 3 ====
First round
Q	(France) A Mannarino	6	6
Q	(France) A Rinderknech	3	3
Q	(Italy) F Fognini	3	5
(Denmark) H Rune	6	7
(Spain) P Carreño Busta	6	6
11	(Italy) M Berrettini	3	2
17	(France) G Monfils	7^{7}	3	6
Alt	(Spain) P Martínez	6^{4}	6	2
A Karatsev	4	4
(United States) M Cressy	6	6
Q	(France) H Gaston	2	3
Q	(United Kingdom) J Draper	6	6

Second round
7	(Italy) J Sinner	2	6	6
Q	(France) A Mannarino	6	4	2
(Denmark) H Rune	0	3
(Spain) P Carreño Busta	6	6
17	(France) G Monfils	7^{12}	7^{8}
(United States) M Cressy	6^{10}	6^{6}
Q	(United Kingdom) J Draper	7	7^{7}
3	(Greece) S Tsitsipas	5	6^{4}

Third round
7	(Italy) J Sinner	2	4
(Spain) P Carreño Busta	6	6
17	(France) G Monfils	2	2^{r}
Q	(United Kingdom) J Draper	6	0

Quarterfinals
(Spain) P Carreño Busta	7^{7}	6
Q	(United Kingdom) J Draper	6^{4}	1

==== Section 4 ====
First round
(Serbia) F Krajinović	2	6	0
(United Kingdom) D Evans	6	1	6
(United States) F Tiafoe	6^{6}	7	6
(France) B Bonzi	7^{8}	5	3
WC	(United Kingdom) A Murray	1	3
10	(United States) T Fritz	6	6
13	(Croatia) M Čilić	6	6
PR	(Croatia) B Ćorić	3	2
(Argentina) F Cerúndolo	6^{4}	7	3
K Khachanov	7^{7}	5	6
WC	(Canada) V Pospisil	4	4
(United States) T Paul	6	6

Second round
5	A Rublev	4	4
(United Kingdom) D Evans	6	6
(United States) F Tiafoe	7	1	4
10	(United States) T Fritz	5	6	6
13	(Croatia) M Čilić	6	6
K Khachanov	3	2
(United States) T Paul	6^{4}	7^{9}	6
2	(Spain) C Alcaraz	7^{7}	6^{7}	3

Third round
(United Kingdom) D Evans	7^{7}	1	7
10	(United States) T Fritz	6^{5}	6	5
13	(Croatia) M Čilić	4	2
(United States) T Paul	6	6

Quarterfinals
(United Kingdom) D Evans	1	6	6
(United States) T Paul	6	3	4

== Seeded players ==
The following are the seeded players. Seedings are based on ATP rankings as of August 1, 2022. Rank and points before are as of August 8, 2022.

Points for the 2021 tournament were not mandatory and are included in the table below only if they counted towards the player's ranking as of August 8, 2022. Players who are not defending points from the 2021 tournament will instead have their 19th best result replaced by their points from the 2022 tournament. Points from the 2019 tournament are being dropped on August 8, 2022, and are accordingly not reflected in this table.

Seed	Rank	Player	Points before	Points defending (or 19th best result)^{†}	Points won	Points after	Status
1	1	Daniil Medvedev	7,875	1,000	10	6,885	Second round lost to (Australia) Nick Kyrgios
2	4	(Spain) Carlos Alcaraz	5,035	(0)	10	5,045	Second round lost to (United States) Tommy Paul
3	5	(Greece) Stefanos Tsitsipas	5,000	360	10	4,650	Second round lost to (United Kingdom) Jack Draper [Q]
4	7	(Norway) Casper Ruud	4,685	180	360	4,865	Semifinals lost to (Poland) Hubert Hurkacz [8]
5	8	Andrey Rublev	3,710	90	10	3,630	Second round lost to (United Kingdom) Dan Evans
6	9	(Canada) Félix Auger-Aliassime	3,490	(45)	180	3,625	Quarterfinals lost to (Norway) Casper Ruud [4]
7	12	(Italy) Jannik Sinner	2,895	10	90	2,975	Third round lost to (Spain) Pablo Carreño Busta
8	10	(Poland) Hubert Hurkacz	3,015	180	600	3,435	Runner-up, lost to (Spain) Pablo Carreño Busta
9	11	(United Kingdom) Cameron Norrie	2,985	10	90	3,065	Third round lost to (Canada) Félix Auger-Aliassime [6]
10	13	(United States) Taylor Fritz	2,860	(20)	90	2,930	Third round lost to (United Kingdom) Dan Evans
11	14	(Italy) Matteo Berrettini	2,430	(0)	10	2,440	First round lost to (Spain) Pablo Carreño Busta
12	15	(Argentina) Diego Schwartzman	2,245	90	45	2,200	Second round lost to (Spain) Albert Ramos Viñolas
13	16	(Croatia) Marin Čilić	2,085	45	90	2,130	Third round lost to (United States) Tommy Paul
~~14~~	~~17~~	~~(United States) Reilly Opelka~~	2,010	600	0	1,410	Withdrew due to heel injury
15	18	(Spain) Roberto Bautista Agut	1,850	180	90	1,760	Third round lost to (Norway) Casper Ruud [4]
16	19	(Bulgaria) Grigor Dimitrov	1,775	10	45	1,810	Second round lost to (Australia) Alex de Minaur
17	20	(France) Gaël Monfils	1,615	180	90	1,525	Third round retired against (United Kingdom) Jack Draper [Q]

† This column shows either the player's points from the 2021 tournament or his 19th best result (shown in brackets). Only ranking points counting towards the player's ranking as of August 8, 2022, are reflected in the column.

=== Withdrawn players ===
The following players would have been seeded, but withdrew before the tournament began.

Rank	Player	Points before	Points defending (or 19th best result)	Points after	Withdrawal reason
2	(Germany) Alexander Zverev	6,760	(0)	6,760	Right ankle injury
3	(Spain) Rafael Nadal	5,620	(0)	5,620	Abdominal injury
6	(Serbia) Novak Djokovic	4,770	(0)	4,770	Failure to meet COVID-19 vaccination requirement for entry into Canada

== Other entry information ==
=== Wild cards ===
- (Canada) Alexis Galarneau
- (Belgium) David Goffin
- (United Kingdom) Andy Murray
- (Canada) Vasek Pospisil

=== Special exempt ===
- (Japan) Yoshihito Nishioka

=== Protected ranking ===
- (Croatia) Borna Ćorić
- (Switzerland) Stan Wawrinka

=== Alternates ===
- (Spain) Pedro Martínez

=== Withdrawals ===
- (Georgia (country)) Nikoloz Basilashvili → replaced by (Slovakia) Alex Molčan
- (Serbia) Novak Djokovic → replaced by (France) Benjamin Bonzi
- (United States) John Isner → replaced by (United States) Brandon Nakashima
- (Spain) Rafael Nadal → replaced by (United States) Mackenzie McDonald
- (United States) Reilly Opelka → replaced by (Spain) Pedro Martínez
- (Germany) Oscar Otte → replaced by (Australia) Nick Kyrgios
- (Germany) Alexander Zverev → replaced by (Finland) Emil Ruusuvuori

== Qualifying ==
=== Seeds ===
1. (United States) Marcos Giron (first round)
2. (Italy) Fabio Fognini (first round)
3. (Portugal) João Sousa (first round)
4. (Australia) James Duckworth (first round)
5. (France) Adrian Mannarino (qualified)
6. (France) Arthur Rinderknech (first round)
7. (France) Quentin Halys (qualifying competition, retired)
8. (France) Hugo Gaston (first round)
9. (South Korea) Kwon Soon-woo (qualifying competition)
10. (Germany) Daniel Altmaier (qualifying competition)
11. (United Kingdom) Jack Draper (qualified)
12. (United States) Denis Kudla (first round)
13. (Australia) Alexei Popyrin (qualifying competition)
14. (Japan) Taro Daniel (qualifying competition)

=== Qualifiers ===
1. (United States) Marcos Giron
2. (Italy) Fabio Fognini
3. (France) Benoît Paire
4. (France) Hugo Gaston
5. (France) Adrian Mannarino
6. (France) Arthur Rinderknech
7. (United Kingdom) Jack Draper

=== Qualifying draw ===
==== First qualifier ====
First round
1	(United States) Marcos Giron	7^{7}	6
(Australia) Jason Kubler	6^{4}	3
Alt	(Canada) Steven Diez	3	6^{4}
13	(Australia) Alexei Popyrin	6	7^{7}

Qualifying competition
1	(United States) Marcos Giron	6	6^{10}	6
13	(Australia) Alexei Popyrin	4	7^{12}	1

==== Second qualifier ====
First round
2	(Italy) Fabio Fognini	6	6
Alt	(Canada) Kelsey Stevenson	3	1
WC	(Canada) Jaden Weekes	3	4
10	(Germany) Daniel Altmaier	6	6

Qualifying competition
2	(Italy) Fabio Fognini	6	4	6
10	(Germany) Daniel Altmaier	3	6	2

==== Third qualifier ====
First round
3	(Portugal) João Sousa	3	6^{2}
(Switzerland) Marc-Andrea Hüsler	6	7^{7}
(France) Benoît Paire	6	6
12	(United States) Denis Kudla	4	4

Qualifying competition
(Switzerland) Marc-Andrea Hüsler	3	6	1
(France) Benoît Paire	6	3	6

==== Fourth qualifier ====
First round
4	(Australia) James Duckworth	3	6^{5}
WC	(Canada) Gabriel Diallo	6	7^{7}
(United States) Michael Mmoh	0^{r}
8	(France) Hugo Gaston	3

Qualifying competition
WC	(Canada) Gabriel Diallo	2	1^{r}
8	(France) Hugo Gaston	6	2

==== Fifth qualifier ====
First round
5	(France) Adrian Mannarino	7	7^{8}
Alt	(Australia) Max Purcell	5	6^{6}
Alt	(Australia) Matthew Ebden	1	6^{1}
9	(South Korea) Kwon Soon-woo	6	7^{7}

Qualifying competition
5	(France) Adrian Mannarino	1	6	6
9	(South Korea) Kwon Soon-woo	6	4	3

==== Sixth qualifier ====
First round
6	(France) Arthur Rinderknech	6	6^{8}	6
WC	(Canada) Juan Carlos Aguilar	3	7^{10}	4
WC	(Canada) Liam Draxl	4	2
14	(Japan) Taro Daniel	6	6

Qualifying competition
6	(France) Arthur Rinderknech	6	6
14	(Japan) Taro Daniel	4	4

==== Seventh qualifier ====
First round
7	(France) Quentin Halys	6	3	6
(Lithuania) Ričardas Berankis	1	6	3
Alt	(Italy) Roberto Marcora	3	0
11	(United Kingdom) Jack Draper	6	6

Qualifying competition
7	(France) Quentin Halys	1^{r}
11	(United Kingdom) Jack Draper	3
