= 2013 Trofeo Faip–Perrel – Doubles =

Perrel – Doubles
- 2013 Trofeo Faip–Perrel

Final
- Champions: (Slovakia) Karol Beck (Slovakia) Andrej Martin
- Runners-up: (Italy) Claudio Grassi (Israel) Amir Weintraub
- Score: 6–3, 3–6, [10–8]

Events
Singles	Doubles
← 2012 ·	Trofeo Faip–Perrel	· 2014 →

Jamie Delgado and Ken Skupski were the defending champions but did not participate.
Karol Beck and Andrej Martin won the final 6–3, 3–6, [10–8] against Claudio Grassi and Amir Weintraub.

== Seeds ==
1. (Poland) Tomasz Bednarek / (Poland) Mateusz Kowalczyk (quarterfinals)
2. (Australia) Jordan Kerr / (Sweden) Andreas Siljeström (quarterfinals)
3. (Austria) Martin Fischer / (Austria) Philipp Oswald (first round)
4. (Italy) Alessandro Motti / (Montenegro) Goran Tošić (semifinals)

== Draw ==
=== Key ===
- Q = Qualifier
- WC = Wild card
- LL = Lucky loser
- Alt = Alternate
- SE = Special exempt
- PR = Protected ranking
- ITF = ITF entry
- JE = Junior exempt
- w/o = Walkover
- r = Retired
- d = Defaulted
- SR = Special ranking

=== Draw ===
First round
1	(Poland) T Bednarek (Poland) M Kowalczyk	6	6
WC	(Italy) Andrea Falgheri (Italy) S Napolitano	2	0
(Germany) A Satschko (Germany) J-L Struff	6^{5}	6	[9]
(Italy) C Grassi (Israel) A Weintraub	7^{7}	3	[11]
4	(Italy) A Motti (Montenegro) G Tošić	5	7^{7}	[10]
(Germany) P Gojowczyk (Germany) B Knittel	7	6^{4}	[7]
(Czech Republic) D Lojda (Czech Republic) J Mertl	3	6^{4}
(Romania) A Dăescu (Ukraine) O Nedovyesov	6	7^{7}
(Slovakia) K Beck (Slovakia) A Martin	6	7^{8}
WC	(Italy) T Fabbiano (Italy) M Trevisan	2	6^{6}
Alt	(Netherlands) S Groen (Sweden) A Vinciguerra	1	6	[11]
3	(Austria) M Fischer (Austria) P Oswald	6	3	[9]
PR	(Germany) A Beck (Romania) M Copil	7	6
(Belarus) U Ignatik (Germany) D Meffert	5	3
WC	(Uzbekistan) F Dustov (Italy) Matteo Volante	6^{5}	6^{2}
2	(Australia) J Kerr (Sweden) A Siljeström	7^{7}	7^{7}

Quarterfinals
1	(Poland) T Bednarek (Poland) M Kowalczyk	4	6	[11]
(Italy) C Grassi (Israel) A Weintraub	6	3	[13]
4	(Italy) A Motti (Montenegro) G Tošić	7^{7}	2	[11]
(Romania) A Dăescu (Ukraine) O Nedovyesov	6^{4}	6	[9]
(Slovakia) K Beck (Slovakia) A Martin	6	6
Alt	(Netherlands) S Groen (Sweden) A Vinciguerra	1	4
PR	(Germany) A Beck (Romania) M Copil	6	7^{7}
2	(Australia) J Kerr (Sweden) A Siljeström	3	6^{3}

Semifinals
(Italy) C Grassi (Israel) A Weintraub	7^{7}	6
4	(Italy) A Motti (Montenegro) G Tošić	6^{3}	2
(Slovakia) K Beck (Slovakia) A Martin	7	7
PR	(Germany) A Beck (Romania) M Copil	5	6^{4}

Final
(Italy) C Grassi (Israel) A Weintraub	3	6	[8]
(Slovakia) K Beck (Slovakia) A Martin	6	3	[10]
