= 2014 Trofeo Faip–Perrel – Doubles =

Perrel – Doubles
- 2014 Trofeo Faip–Perrel

Final
- Champions: (Slovakia) Karol Beck (Slovakia) Michal Mertiňák
- Runners-up: (Russia) Konstantin Kravchuk (Ukraine) Denys Molchanov
- Score: 4–6, 7–5, [10–6]

Events
Singles	Doubles
← 2013 ·	Trofeo Faip–Perrel	· 2015 →

Karol Beck and Andrej Martin were the defending champions; however, the latter decided not to participate that year, and Beck is playing alongside Michal Mertiňák instead.

Beck and Mertiňák won the title, defeating Konstantin Kravchuk and Denys Molchanov in the final, 4–6, 7–5, [10–6].

== Seeds ==
1. (Germany) Dustin Brown / (United States) Austin Krajicek (semifinals)
2. (Finland) Henri Kontinen / (Sweden) Andreas Siljeström (first round)
3. (Brazil) Marcelo Demoliner / (Czech Republic) Jaroslav Pospíšil (first round)
4. (Italy) Riccardo Ghedin / (Italy) Claudio Grassi (semifinals)

== Draw ==
=== Key ===
- Q = Qualifier
- WC = Wild card
- LL = Lucky loser
- Alt = Alternate
- SE = Special exempt
- PR = Protected ranking
- ITF = ITF entry
- JE = Junior exempt
- w/o = Walkover
- r = Retired
- d = Defaulted
- SR = Special ranking

=== Draw ===
First round
1	(Germany) D Brown (United States) A Krajicek	6	6
(Germany) A Beck (Austria) M Fischer	4	4
(Croatia) A Pavić (Croatia) F Škugor	7	4	[10]
(Italy) F Cipolla (Italy) M Viola	5	6	[7]
3	(Brazil) M Demoliner (Czech Republic) J Pospíšil	4	4
(Belgium) N Desein (Germany) J-L Struff	6	6
WC	(Slovakia) K Beck (Slovakia) M Mertiňák	7^{10}	4	[10]
(Poland) B Koniusz (Poland) M Kowalczyk	6^{8}	6	[8]
(Hungary) M Fucsovics (Italy) A Motti	6	6
WC	(Italy) R Marcora (Italy) M Trevisan	4	3
WC	(Italy) G Quinzi (Italy) A Virgili	6^{1}	6^{3}
4	(Italy) R Ghedin (Italy) C Grassi	7^{7}	7^{7}
(Republic of Ireland) J Cluskey (France) F Martin	7	6
(Italy) M Cecchinato (Bosnia and Herzegovina) D Džumhur	5	4
(Russia) K Kravchuk (Ukraine) D Molchanov	3	6	[10]
2	(Finland) H Kontinen (Sweden) A Siljeström	6	3	[8]

Quarterfinals
1	(Germany) D Brown (United States) A Krajicek	6	7^{10}
(Croatia) A Pavić (Croatia) F Škugor	4	6^{8}
(Belgium) N Desein (Germany) J-L Struff	1	2
WC	(Slovakia) K Beck (Slovakia) M Mertiňák	6	6
(Hungary) M Fucsovics (Italy) A Motti	6^{8}	2
4	(Italy) R Ghedin (Italy) C Grassi	7^{10}	6
(Republic of Ireland) J Cluskey (France) F Martin	6^{4}	3
(Russia) K Kravchuk (Ukraine) D Molchanov	7^{7}	6

Semifinals
1	(Germany) D Brown (United States) A Krajicek	6^{1}	5
WC	(Slovakia) K Beck (Slovakia) M Mertiňák	7^{7}	7
4	(Italy) R Ghedin (Italy) C Grassi	6^{3}	7^{7}	[1]
(Russia) K Kravchuk (Ukraine) D Molchanov	7^{7}	6^{5}	[10]

Final
WC	(Slovakia) K Beck (Slovakia) M Mertiňák	4	7	[10]
(Russia) K Kravchuk (Ukraine) D Molchanov	6	5	[6]
