= 2015 Trofeo Faip–Perrel – Singles =

Perrel – Singles
- 2015 Trofeo Faip–Perrel

Final
- Champion: (France) Benoît Paire
- Runner-up: (Kazakhstan) Aleksandr Nedovyesov
- Score: 6–3, 7–6^{(7–3)}

Events
Singles	Doubles
← 2014 ·	Trofeo Faip–Perrel	· 2016 →

Simone Bolelli was the defending champion, but decided to play in the 2015 ABN AMRO World Tennis Tournament instead.

Benoît Paire won the title defeating Aleksandr Nedovyesov in the final, 6–3, 7–6^{(7–3)}.

== Seeds ==
1. (Germany) Andreas Beck (first round)
2. (France) Lucas Pouille (quarterfinals)
3. (Uzbekistan) Farrukh Dustov (quarterfinals)
4. (Kazakhstan) Aleksandr Nedovyesov
5. (Ukraine) Illya Marchenko (semifinals)
6. (France) Benoît Paire (champion)
7. (Croatia) Mate Delić (first round)
8. (Hungary) Márton Fucsovics (first round)

== Draw ==
=== Key ===
- Q = Qualifier
- WC = Wild card
- LL = Lucky loser
- Alt = Alternate
- SE = Special exempt
- PR = Protected ranking
- ITF = ITF entry
- JE = Junior exempt
- w/o = Walkover
- r = Retired
- d = Defaulted
- SR = Special ranking

=== Finals ===
Semifinals
5	(Ukraine) Illya Marchenko	4	6	6^{3}
4	(Kazakhstan) Aleksandr Nedovyesov	6	3	7^{7}
6/Alt	(France) Benoît Paire	6	6
(Estonia) Jürgen Zopp	4	4

Final
4	(Kazakhstan) Aleksandr Nedovyesov	3	6^{3}
6/Alt	(France) Benoît Paire	6	7^{7}

=== Top half ===
First round
1	(Germany) A Beck	3	6^{5}
(Russia) K Kravchuk	6	7^{7}
(Spain) E López-Pérez	6^{2}	3
Q	(Germany) D Brands	7^{7}	6
Alt	(France) A Michon	3	6	6
Q	(France) M Teixeira	6	3	4
(Italy) A Arnaboldi	3	5
5	(Ukraine) I Marchenko	6	7
4	(Kazakhstan) A Nedovyesov	6	6
WC	(Italy) R Marcora	4	4
(Canada) F Dancevic	7^{7}	7^{11}
WC	(Italy) Andrea Falgheri	6^{4}	6^{9}
(Germany) T Pütz	6	6
Q	(Austria) M Fischer	3	4
(Czech Republic) J Hernych	6	6
8	(Hungary) M Fucsovics	1	2

Second round
(Russia) K Kravchuk	6^{5}	6^{5}
Q	(Germany) D Brands	7^{7}	7^{7}
Alt	(France) A Michon	2	6	2
5	(Ukraine) I Marchenko	6	4	6
4	(Kazakhstan) A Nedovyesov	7^{7}	6
(Canada) F Dancevic	6^{2}	3
(Germany) T Pütz	6	7
(Czech Republic) J Hernych	4	5

Quarterfinals
Q	(Germany) D Brands	6^{6}	3
5	(Ukraine) I Marchenko	7^{8}	6
4	(Kazakhstan) A Nedovyesov	4	6	6
(Germany) T Pütz	6	1	2

Semifinals
5	(Ukraine) I Marchenko	4	6	6^{3}
4	(Kazakhstan) A Nedovyesov	6	3	7^{7}

=== Bottom half ===
First round
6/Alt	(France) B Paire	4	7	6
(Czech Republic) J Mertl	6	5	4
WC	(France) E Couacaud	4	4
(Serbia) I Bozoljac	6	6
(Belgium) M Authom	6	2	6
(Poland) M Przysiężny	4	6	4
(France) D Guez	2	1
3	(Uzbekistan) F Dustov	6	6
7	(Croatia) M Delić	5	6	3
PR	(Germany) P Petzschner	7	3	6
(Estonia) J Zopp	7^{7}	6
(Slovakia) J Kovalík	6^{2}	4
WC	(Italy) F Gaio	7	3	4
Q	(Bosnia and Herzegovina) M Bašić	5	6	6
(Slovakia) A Martin	3	4
2	(France) L Pouille	6	6

Second round
6/Alt	(France) B Paire	6^{5}	7^{7}	6
(Serbia) I Bozoljac	7^{7}	6^{4}	3
(Belgium) M Authom	6^{0}	3
3	(Uzbekistan) F Dustov	7^{7}	6
PR	(Germany) P Petzschner	3	2
(Estonia) J Zopp	6	6
Q	(Bosnia and Herzegovina) M Bašić	6^{5}	3
2	(France) L Pouille	7^{7}	6

Quarterfinals
6/Alt	(France) B Paire	6	6
3	(Uzbekistan) F Dustov	4	4
(Estonia) J Zopp	7	7^{7}
2	(France) L Pouille	5	6^{2}

Semifinals
6/Alt	(France) B Paire	6	6
(Estonia) J Zopp	4	4
