= 2014 Trofeo Faip–Perrel – Singles =

Perrel – Singles
- 2014 Trofeo Faip–Perrel

Final
- Champion: (Italy) Simone Bolelli
- Runner-up: (Germany) Jan-Lennard Struff
- Score: 7–6^{(8–6)}, 6–4

Events
Singles	Doubles
← 2013 ·	Trofeo Faip–Perrel	· 2015 →

Michał Przysiężny was the defending champion, but decided to participate in 2014 U.S. National Indoor Tennis Championships instead.

Bolelli won the title, defeating Jan-Lennard Struff in the final, 7–6^{(8–6)}, 6–4.

== Seeds ==
1. (Germany) Dustin Brown (semifinals)
2. (Germany) Jan-Lennard Struff (final)
3. (Bosnia and Herzegovina) Damir Džumhur (first round)
4. (Lithuania) Ričardas Berankis (second round)
5. (Italy) Marco Cecchinato (first round)
6. (Germany) Matthias Bachinger (second round)
7. (Italy) Matteo Viola (second round)
8. (Russia) Konstantin Kravchuk (second round)

== Draw ==
=== Key ===
- Q = Qualifier
- WC = Wild card
- LL = Lucky loser
- Alt = Alternate
- ITF = ITF entry
- PR = Protected ranking
- SR = Special ranking
- SE = Special exempt
- JE = Junior exempt
- JR = Junior Accelerator Programme entrant
- CO = College Accelerator Programme entrant
- NG = Next Gen Accelerator Program entrant
- w/o = Walkover
- r = Retired
- d = Defaulted

=== Finals ===
Semifinals
1	(Germany) Dustin Brown	3	6	4
WC	(Italy) Simone Bolelli	6	2	6
(Italy) Andrea Arnaboldi	2	4
2	(Germany) Jan-Lennard Struff	6	6

Final
WC	(Italy) Simone Bolelli	7^{8}	6
2	(Germany) Jan-Lennard Struff	6^{6}	4

=== Top half ===
First round
1	(Germany) D Brown	6^{4}	7	6
(Turkey) M İlhan	7^{7}	5	4
(Czech Republic) J Hernych	7^{8}	6
WC	(Italy) G Quinzi	6^{6}	0
(Lithuania) L Grigelis	7^{9}	7
WC	(Italy) Andrea Falgheri	6^{7}	5
Q	(United Kingdom) E Corrie	7^{10}	6
5	(Italy) M Cecchinato	6^{8}	3
3	(Bosnia and Herzegovina) D Džumhur	3	6	4
(Italy) L Giustino	6	2	6
(Czech Republic) J Pospíšil	3	4
Q	(Italy) M Trevisan	6	6
Q	(Italy) F Gaio	3	4
WC	(Italy) S Bolelli	6	6
(Belgium) N Desein	4	4
6	(Germany) M Bachinger	6	6

Second round
1	(Germany) D Brown	1	7	6
(Czech Republic) J Hernych	6	5	3
(Lithuania) L Grigelis	7	6^{7}	6
Q	(United Kingdom) E Corrie	5	7^{9}	4
(Italy) L Giustino	6	3	2
Q	(Italy) M Trevisan	4	6	6
WC	(Italy) S Bolelli	6	6
6	(Germany) M Bachinger	3	4

Quarterfinals
1	(Germany) D Brown	6	6^{5}	7^{7}
(Lithuania) L Grigelis	6	7^{7}	6^{4}
Q	(Italy) M Trevisan	7^{7}	3	4
WC	(Italy) S Bolelli	6^{5}	6	6

Semifinals
1	(Germany) D Brown	3	6	4
WC	(Italy) S Bolelli	6	2	6

=== Bottom half ===
First round
7	(Italy) M Viola	7^{9}	6
Q	(Slovakia) K Beck	6^{7}	3
(Italy) A Arnaboldi	7^{7}	6
(Uzbekistan) F Dustov	6^{5}	4
(Hungary) M Fucsovics	6	7^{7}
(Belarus) E Gerasimov	3	6^{3}
(Austria) M Fischer	5	3
4	(Lithuania) R Berankis	7	6
8	(Russia) K Kravchuk	6	7^{9}
WC	(Italy) M Donati	4	6^{7}
(United States) A Krajicek	2	4
(Germany) A Beck	6	6
(Croatia) A Pavić	4	6^{9}
(Slovakia) M Mečíř	6	7^{11}
(Italy) F Cipolla	3	3
2	(Germany) J-L Struff	6	6

Second round
7	(Italy) M Viola	6^{8}	2
(Italy) A Arnaboldi	7^{10}	6
(Hungary) M Fucsovics	6	6
4	(Lithuania) R Berankis	3	4
8	(Russia) K Kravchuk	6^{5}	6^{5}
(Germany) A Beck	7^{7}	7^{7}
(Slovakia) M Mečíř	3	7^{9}	6^{4}
2	(Germany) J-L Struff	6	6^{7}	7^{7}

Quarterfinals
(Italy) A Arnaboldi	6	6
(Hungary) M Fucsovics	3	4
(Germany) A Beck	3	6^{7}
2	(Germany) J-L Struff	6	7^{9}

Semifinals
(Italy) A Arnaboldi	2	4
2	(Germany) J-L Struff	6	6
