= 2015 Trofeo Faip–Perrel – Doubles =

Perrel – Doubles
- 2015 Trofeo Faip–Perrel

Final
- Champions: (Germany) Martin Emmrich (Sweden) Andreas Siljeström
- Runners-up: (Poland) Błażej Koniusz (Poland) Mateusz Kowalczyk
- Score: 6–4, 7–5

Events
Singles	Doubles
← 2014 ·	Trofeo Faip–Perrel	· 2016 →

Karol Beck and Michal Mertiňák were the defending champions, but they did not participate this year.

Martin Emmrich and Andreas Siljeström won the title, defeating Błażej Koniusz and Mateusz Kowalczyk in the final, 6–4, 7–5.

== Seeds ==
1. (Australia) Rameez Junaid / (Canada) Adil Shamasdin (first round)
2. (Belarus) Sergey Betov / (Belarus) Alexander Bury (first round)
3. (United Kingdom) Ken Skupski / (United Kingdom) Neal Skupski (first round)
4. (Germany) Martin Emmrich / (Sweden) Andreas Siljeström (champions)

== Draw ==
=== Key ===
- Q = Qualifier
- WC = Wild card
- LL = Lucky loser
- Alt = Alternate
- SE = Special exempt
- PR = Protected ranking
- ITF = ITF entry
- JE = Junior exempt
- w/o = Walkover
- r = Retired
- d = Defaulted
- SR = Special ranking

First round
1	(Australia) R Junaid (Canada) A Shamasdin	3	7	[7]
(Russia) K Kravchuk (Ukraine) I Marchenko	6	5	[10]
(Czech Republic) R Jebavý (Slovakia) I Zelenay	6^{5}	6	[15]
(China) M Gong (Chinese Taipei) H-y Peng	7^{7}	3	[17]
3	(United Kingdom) K Skupski (United Kingdom) N Skupski	6^{5}	6^{6}
(New Zealand) M Daniell (Italy) A Motti	7^{7}	7^{8}
(Poland) B Koniusz (Poland) M Kowalczyk	6	6
WC	(Italy) F Gaio (Italy) A Virgili	2	4
(Italy) F Cipolla (Uzbekistan) F Dustov	3	7	[10]
WC	(Italy) A Arnaboldi (Italy) C Grassi	6	5	[8]
WC	(Republic of Ireland) J Cluskey (Lithuania) L Grigelis	4	7^{16}	[6]
4	(Germany) M Emmrich (Sweden) A Siljeström	6	6^{14}	[10]
(Germany) P Petzschner (Germany) T Puetz	6	6
(Russia) M Elgin (Kazakhstan) A Nedovyesov	2	3
(France) B Paire (France) L Pouille	7	6
2	(Belarus) S Betov (Belarus) A Bury	5	4

Quarterfinals
(Russia) K Kravchuk (Ukraine) I Marchenko	6	6^{10}	[10]
(China) M Gong (Chinese Taipei) H-y Peng	3	7^{12}	[12]
(New Zealand) M Daniell (Italy) A Motti	6	5	[9]
(Poland) B Koniusz (Poland) M Kowalczyk	3	7	[11]
(Italy) F Cipolla (Uzbekistan) F Dustov	3	6	[8]
4	(Germany) M Emmrich (Sweden) A Siljeström	6	2	[10]
(Germany) P Petzschner (Germany) T Puetz	6	6
(France) B Paire (France) L Pouille	2	4

Semifinals
(China) M Gong (Chinese Taipei) H-y Peng	6^{5}	3
(Poland) B Koniusz (Poland) M Kowalczyk	7^{7}	6
4	(Germany) M Emmrich (Sweden) A Siljeström	7^{7}	7^{7}
(Germany) P Petzschner (Germany) T Puetz	6^{3}	6^{5}

Final
(Poland) B Koniusz (Poland) M Kowalczyk	4	5
4	(Germany) M Emmrich (Sweden) A Siljeström	6	7
