= 2012 Internazionali Trofeo Lame Perrel–Faip – Singles =

Faip – Singles
- 2012 Internazionali Trofeo Lame Perrel–Faip

Final
- Champion: (Germany) Björn Phau
- Runner-up: (Russia) Alexander Kudryavtsev
- Score: 6–4, 6–4

Events
Singles	Doubles
← 2011 ·	Internazionali Trofeo Lame Perrel–Faip	· 2013 →

Andreas Seppi was the defending champion but decided not to participate.
Björn Phau won the title after defeating Alexander Kudryavtsev 6–4, 6–4 in the final.

== Seeds ==
1. (Japan) Go Soeda (second round)
2. (Slovenia) Grega Žemlja (first round)
3. (Tunisia) Malek Jaziri (first round)
4. (Slovakia) Martin Kližan (first round)
5. (Estonia) Jürgen Zopp (quarterfinals, retired due to a right arm injury)
6. (Kazakhstan) Andrey Golubev (withdrew due to a back injury)
7. (Germany) Björn Phau (champion)
8. (Spain) Pablo Carreño-Busta (first round)

== Draw ==
Key

- Q = Qualifier
- WC = Wild card
- LL = Lucky loser
- Alt = Alternate
- ITF = ITF entry
- PR = Protected ranking
- SR = Special ranking
- SE = Special exempt
- JE = Junior exempt
- JR = Junior Accelerator Programme entrant
- CO = College Accelerator Programme entrant
- NG = Next Gen Accelerator Program entrant
- w/o = Walkover
- r = Retired
- d = Defaulted

=== Finals ===
Semifinals
7	(Germany) Björn Phau	6	7
WC	(Germany) Benjamin Becker	4	5
(France) Arnaud Clément	2	5
(Russia) Alexander Kudryavtsev	6	7

Final
7	(Germany) Björn Phau	6	6
(Russia) Alexander Kudryavtsev	4	4

=== Top half ===
First round
1	(Japan) G Soeda	6	6
Q	(Romania) M Copil	4	4
WC	(Italy) Claudio Grassi	7^{7}	4	4
(Belarus) U Ignatik	6^{2}	6	6
(Germany) D Gremelmayr	5	6^{2}
WC	(Italy) A Arnaboldi	7	7^{7}
(Germany) D Brown	4	3
7	(Germany) B Phau	6	6
3	(Tunisia) M Jaziri	4	5
Alt	(Bosnia and Herzegovina) A Delić	6	7
Q	(Belgium) Julien Dubail	2	3
WC	(Germany) B Becker	6	6
(Serbia) D Lajović	3	6	6
Q	(France) A Olivetti	6	4	3
(Spain) I Navarro	3	2
LL	(Belgium) M Authom	6	6

Second round
1	(Japan) G Soeda	1	5
(Belarus) U Ignatik	6	7
WC	(Italy) A Arnaboldi	4	3
7	(Germany) B Phau	6	6
Alt	(Bosnia and Herzegovina) A Delić	2	1
WC	(Germany) B Becker	6	6
(Serbia) D Lajović	6	3	2
LL	(Belgium) M Authom	3	6	6

Quarterfinals
(Belarus) U Ignatik	6	6^{5}	2
7	(Germany) B Phau	3	7^{7}	6
WC	(Germany) B Becker	6	7^{7}
LL	(Belgium) M Authom	4	6^{3}

Semifinals
7	(Germany) B Phau	6	7
WC	(Germany) B Becker	4	5

=== Bottom half ===
First round
8	(Spain) P Carreño-Busta	7	2	2
Alt	(Austria) M Fischer	5	6	6
(Finland) H Heliövaara	6	4	4
(France) A Clément	3	6	6
(Russia) K Kravchuk	6	6
(Italy) S Galvani	4	4
(Belgium) D Goffin	7^{7}	6
4	(Slovakia) M Kližan	6^{5}	4
5	(Estonia) J Zopp	6	6
Q	(France) G Burquier	2	4
(Switzerland) S Bohli	4	3
WC	(Italy) M Crugnola	6	6
(Lithuania) L Grigelis	6	6
(Portugal) J Sousa	3	4
(Russia) A Kudryavtsev	6	7^{7}
2	(Slovenia) G Žemlja	2	6^{5}

Second round
Alt	(Austria) M Fischer	2	6	3
(France) A Clément	6	4	6
(Russia) K Kravchuk	6	1	6
(Belgium) D Goffin	3	6	3
5	(Estonia) J Zopp	6	6
WC	(Italy) M Crugnola	4	4
(Lithuania) L Grigelis	6	1	4
(Russia) A Kudryavtsev	3	6	6

Quarterfinals
(France) A Clément	6	6
(Russia) K Kravchuk	4	2
5	(Estonia) J Zopp	7^{8}	3	0^{r}
(Russia) A Kudryavtsev	6^{6}	6	1

Semifinals
(France) A Clément	2	5
(Russia) A Kudryavtsev	6	7
