= 2016 Dubai Tennis Championships – Men's singles =

Men's singles
- 2016 Dubai Tennis Championships

Final
- Champion: (Switzerland) Stan Wawrinka
- Runner-up: (Cyprus) Marcos Baghdatis
- Score: 6–4, 7–6^{(15–13)}

Details
- Draw: 32
- Seeds: 8

Events
Singles	men	women
Doubles	men	women
- Dubai Tennis Championships

Stan Wawrinka defeated Marcos Baghdatis in the final, 6–4, 7–6^{(15–13)} to win the men's singles tennis title at the 2016 Dubai Tennis Championships.

Roger Federer was the two-time reigning champion, but withdrew due to a knee injury.

This marked the first tournament Novak Djokovic participated in where he failed to reach the final since the 2015 Qatar Open, snapping a streak of 17 finals, when he was forced to retire from his quarterfinal match against Feliciano López due to an eye injury.

== Seeds ==
1. (Serbia) Novak Djokovic (quarterfinals, retired due to an eye injury)
2. (Switzerland) Stan Wawrinka (champion)
3. (Czech Republic) Tomáš Berdych (quarterfinals)
4. (Spain) Roberto Bautista Agut (quarterfinals)
5. (Serbia) Viktor Troicki (first round)
6. (Spain) Feliciano López (semifinals)
7. (Slovakia) Martin Kližan (first round)
8. (Germany) Philipp Kohlschreiber (quarterfinals)

== Draw ==
Key

- Q = Qualifier
- WC = Wild card
- LL = Lucky loser
- Alt = Alternate
- ITF = ITF entry
- PR = Protected ranking
- SR = Special ranking
- SE = Special exempt
- JE = Junior exempt
- JR = Junior Accelerator Programme entrant
- CO = College Accelerator Programme entrant
- NG = Next Gen Accelerator Program entrant
- w/o = Walkover
- r = Retired
- d = Defaulted

=== Finals ===
Semifinals
6	(Spain) Feliciano López	6	6^{1}	1
(Cyprus) Marcos Baghdatis	3	7^{7}	6
(Australia) Nick Kyrgios	4	0^{r}
2	(Switzerland) Stan Wawrinka	6	3

Final
(Cyprus) Marcos Baghdatis	4	6^{13}
2	(Switzerland) Stan Wawrinka	6	7^{15}

=== Top half ===
First round
1	(Serbia) N Djokovic	6	6
(Spain) T Robredo	1	2
Q	(Russia) M Youzhny	4	1
WC	(Tunisia) M Jaziri	6	6
WC	(India) Y Bhambri	6	6^{2}	0
(Czech Republic) L Rosol	2	7^{7}	6
(Spain) G García-López	1	6	4
6	(Spain) F López	6	4	6
4	(Spain) R Bautista Agut	6	6
(Italy) S Bolelli	2	4
(South Korea) H Chung	6	6
(Italy) A Seppi	3	4
(Canada) V Pospisil	6	5	6
Q	(France) L Pouille	3	7	4
(Cyprus) M Baghdatis	7^{7}	6
5	(Serbia) V Troicki	6^{2}	2

Second round
1	(Serbia) N Djokovic	6	6
WC	(Tunisia) M Jaziri	1	2
(Czech Republic) L Rosol	3	6^{7}
6	(Spain) F López	6	7^{9}
4	(Spain) R Bautista Agut	6	6
(South Korea) H Chung	0	1
(Canada) V Pospisil	4	2
(Cyprus) M Baghdatis	6	6

Quarterfinals
1	(Serbia) N Djokovic	3	0^{r}
6	(Spain) F López	6	0
4	(Spain) R Bautista Agut	5	0
(Cyprus) M Baghdatis	7	6

Semifinals
6	(Spain) F López	6	6^{1}	1
(Cyprus) M Baghdatis	3	7^{7}	6

=== Bottom half ===
First round
7	(Slovakia) M Kližan	6	3	2
(Australia) N Kyrgios	3	6	6
(Kazakhstan) M Kukushkin	7	7^{7}
(Uzbekistan) D Istomin	5	6^{3}
Q	(Italy) T Fabbiano	6	6
(Argentina) L Mayer	3	4
(Portugal) J Sousa	1	4
3	(Czech Republic) T Berdych	6	6
8	(Germany) P Kohlschreiber	6	7
WC	(Turkey) M İlhan	1	5
(Croatia) B Ćorić	6	6
(Czech Republic) J Veselý	4	4
(Russia) T Gabashvili	2	3
Q	(Croatia) F Škugor	6	6
(Ukraine) S Stakhovsky	7	3	5
2	(Switzerland) S Wawrinka	5	6	7

Second round
(Australia) N Kyrgios	6	6
(Kazakhstan) M Kukushkin	3	2
Q	(Italy) T Fabbiano	2	2
3	(Czech Republic) T Berdych	6	6
8	(Germany) P Kohlschreiber	6	7^{7}
(Croatia) B Ćorić	2	6^{5}
Q	(Croatia) F Škugor	5	1
2	(Switzerland) S Wawrinka	7	6

Quarterfinals
(Australia) N Kyrgios	6	6
3	(Czech Republic) T Berdych	4	4
8	(Germany) P Kohlschreiber	5	1
2	(Switzerland) S Wawrinka	7	6

Semifinals
(Australia) N Kyrgios	4	0^{r}
2	(Switzerland) S Wawrinka	6	3

== Qualifying ==
=== Seeds ===
1. (Russia) Mikhail Youzhny (qualified)
2. (Croatia) Ivan Dodig (qualifying competition)
3. (United Kingdom) Kyle Edmund (qualifying competition)
4. (France) Lucas Pouille (qualified)
5. (Belgium) Ruben Bemelmans (qualifying competition)
6. (Georgia (country)) Nikoloz Basilashvili (qualifying competition)
7. (Italy) Thomas Fabbiano (qualified)
8. (United Kingdom) James Ward (first round)

=== Qualifiers ===
1. (Russia) Mikhail Youzhny
2. (Italy) Thomas Fabbiano
3. (Croatia) Franko Škugor
4. (France) Lucas Pouille

=== Qualifying draw ===
==== First qualifier ====
First round
1	(Russia) Mikhail Youzhny	7^{7}	6
WC	(Republic of Ireland) Sam Barry	6^{1}	2
(Belgium) Yannick Mertens	6^{2}	0
6	(Georgia (country)) Nikoloz Basilashvili	7^{7}	6

Qualifying competition
1	(Russia) Mikhail Youzhny	6	6
6	(Georgia (country)) Nikoloz Basilashvili	2	4

==== Second qualifier ====
First round
2	(Croatia) Ivan Dodig	7	6
(Italy) Roberto Marcora	5	2
WC	(Turkey) Cem İlkel	3	6	2
7	(Italy) Thomas Fabbiano	6	2	6

Qualifying competition
2	(Croatia) Ivan Dodig	7^{7}	4	2
7	(Italy) Thomas Fabbiano	6^{1}	6	6

==== Third qualifier ====
First round
3	(United Kingdom) Kyle Edmund	6	6
(Czech Republic) Radek Štěpánek	3	4
(Croatia) Franko Škugor	6	6
8	(United Kingdom) James Ward	3	4

Qualifying competition
3	(United Kingdom) Kyle Edmund	4	2
(Croatia) Franko Škugor	6	6

==== Fourth qualifier ====
First round
4	(France) Lucas Pouille	6	6
WC	(Netherlands) Roy de Valk	1	0
(Germany) Mischa Zverev	4	7^{7}	3
5	(Belgium) Ruben Bemelmans	6	6^{2}	6

Qualifying competition
4	(France) Lucas Pouille	6	6
5	(Belgium) Ruben Bemelmans	2	3
