= 2012 Internazionali Trofeo Lame Perrel–Faip – Doubles =

Faip – Doubles
- 2012 Internazionali Trofeo Lame Perrel–Faip

Final
- Champions: (United Kingdom) Jamie Delgado (United Kingdom) Ken Skupski
- Runners-up: (Austria) Martin Fischer (Austria) Philipp Oswald
- Score: 7–5, 7–5

Events
| Singles | Doubles |
| ← 2011 · | Internazionali Trofeo Lame Perrel–Faip | · 2013 → |

Frederik Nielsen and Ken Skupski were the defending champions but Nielsen decided not to participate.
Skupski plays alongside Jamie Delgado. They went on to win the title against Martin Fischer and Philipp Oswald 7–5, 7–5 in the final.

== Seeds ==
1. (Germany) Martin Emmrich / (Sweden) Andreas Siljeström (semifinals)
2. (Germany) Dustin Brown / (United Kingdom) Jonathan Marray (semifinals)
3. (United Kingdom) Jamie Delgado / (United Kingdom) Ken Skupski (champions)
4. (France) Olivier Charroin / (Russia) Alexander Kudryavtsev (first round)

== Draw ==
=== Key ===
- Q = Qualifier
- WC = Wild card
- LL = Lucky loser
- Alt = Alternate
- SE = Special exempt
- PR = Protected ranking
- ITF = ITF entry
- JE = Junior exempt
- w/o = Walkover
- r = Retired
- d = Defaulted
- SR = Special ranking

=== Draw ===
First round
1 | (Germany) M Emmrich (Sweden) A Siljeström | 6 | 6
WC | (Italy) Federico Torresi (Italy) L Vanni | 3 | 4
(Poland) T Bednarek (Italy) A Motti | 5 | 5
(Bosnia and Herzegovina) A Delić (Spain) I Navarro | 7 | 7
4 | (France) O Charroin (Russia) A Kudryavtsev | 1 | 4
(Austria) M Fischer (Austria) P Oswald | 6 | 6
WC | (Italy) Claudio Grassi (Italy) Matteo Volante | 2 | 6^{3}
(Germany) D Gremelmayr (Germany) B Phau | 6 | 7^{7}
(Tunisia) M Jaziri (France) A Olivetti | 2 | 2
WC | (Italy) M Crugnola (Italy) S Galvani | 6 | 6
(Australia) R Junaid (Germany) S Stadler | 3 | 4
3 | (United Kingdom) J Delgado (United Kingdom) K Skupski | 6 | 6
(Finland) H Heliövaara (Estonia) J Zopp | 6^{4} | 2
(United Kingdom) D Rice (United Kingdom) S Thornley | 7^{7} | 6
(Australia) J Kerr (United States) T Parrott | 4 | 6^{0}
2 | (Germany) D Brown (United Kingdom) J Marray | 6 | 7^{7}

Quarterfinals
1 | (Germany) M Emmrich (Sweden) A Siljeström | 7^{15} | 6
(Bosnia and Herzegovina) A Delić (Spain) I Navarro | 6^{13} | 3
(Austria) M Fischer (Austria) P Oswald | 6 | 7^{7}
(Germany) D Gremelmayr (Germany) B Phau | 2 | 6^{3}
WC | (Italy) M Crugnola (Italy) S Galvani | 5 | 6^{9}
3 | (United Kingdom) J Delgado (United Kingdom) K Skupski | 7 | 7^{11}
(United Kingdom) D Rice (United Kingdom) S Thornley | 6 | 4 | [3]
2 | (Germany) D Brown (United Kingdom) J Marray | 4 | 6 | [10]

Semifinals
1 | (Germany) M Emmrich (Sweden) A Siljeström | 6^{5} | 6 | [8]
(Austria) M Fischer (Austria) P Oswald | 7^{7} | 3 | [10]
3 | (United Kingdom) J Delgado (United Kingdom) K Skupski | 6 | 7^{7}
2 | (Germany) D Brown (United Kingdom) J Marray | 3 | 6^{4}

Final
(Austria) M Fischer (Austria) P Oswald | 5 | 5
3 | (United Kingdom) J Delgado (United Kingdom) K Skupski | 7 | 7
