= 2010 Canella Challenger =

- Date: May 10–16, 2010
- Edition: 6th
- Location: Biella, Italy

Champions

Singles
- (Germany) Björn Phau

Doubles
- (United States) James Cerretani / (Canada) Adil Shamasdin
← 2009 ·	Canella Challenger	· 2014 →

The 2010 Canella Challenger was a professional tennis tournament played on outdoor red clay courts. It was part of the 2010 ATP Challenger Tour. It took place in Biella, Italy between May 10 and May 16, 2010. It returned for the first time since 2006.

== Entrants ==
=== Seeds ===
Nationality	Player	Ranking*	Seeding
ITA	Potito Starace	60	1
GER	Andreas Beck	85	2
ITA	Paolo Lorenzi	95	3
JAM	Dustin Brown	103	4
ITA	Simone Bolelli	113	5
RUS	Teymuraz Gabashvili	116	6
GER	Björn Phau	138	7
ESP	Pablo Andújar	149	8

- Rankings are as of May 3, 2010.

=== Other entrants ===
The following players received wildcards into the singles main draw:

- (Italy) Paolo Lorenzi
- (Italy) Enrico Fioravante
- (Italy) Federico Gaio
- (Italy) Stefano Napolitano

The following players received entry from the qualifying draw:

- (Argentina) Martín Alund
- (Italy) Alberto Brizzi
- (Spain) Sergio Gutiérrez-Ferrol
- (Italy) Gianluca Naso

The following player received a lucky loser spot:

- (Italy) Andrea Arnaboldi

== Champions ==
=== Singles ===
(Germany) Björn Phau def. (Italy) Simone Bolelli, 6–4, 6–2

=== Doubles ===
(United States) James Cerretani / (Canada) Adil Shamasdin def. (Jamaica) Dustin Brown / (Italy) Alessandro Motti, 6–3, 2–6, [11–9]
