= 2010 Canella Challenger – Doubles =

Doubles
- 2010 Canella Challenger

Final
- Champions: (United States) James Cerretani; (Canada) Adil Shamasdin
- Runners-up: (Jamaica) Dustin Brown (Italy) Alessandro Motti
- Score: 6–3, 2–6, [11–9]

Events
Singles	Doubles
← 2009 ·	Canella Challenger	· 2011 →

James Cerretani and Adil Shamasdin won in the final 6–3, 2–6, [11–9] against Dustin Brown and Alessandro Motti.

== Seeds ==
The 1st-seeded pair received a bye into the second round.

1. (United States) James Cerretani / (Canada) Adil Shamasdin (champions)
2. (Jamaica) Dustin Brown / (Italy) Alessandro Motti (final)
3. (Argentina) Martín Alund / (Brazil) Rogério Dutra da Silva (first round)
4. (Argentina) Juan Pablo Brzezicki / (Brazil) Márcio Torres (quarterfinals)

== Draw ==
=== Key ===
- Q = Qualifier
- WC = Wild card
- LL = Lucky loser
- Alt = Alternate
- SE = Special exempt
- PR = Protected ranking
- ITF = ITF entry
- JE = Junior exempt
- w/o = Walkover
- r = Retired
- d = Defaulted
- SR = Special ranking

=== Draw ===
First round

Quarterfinals

Semifinals

Finals

1
- (United States) J Cerretani
- (Canada) A Shamasdin
6
6

- (Chile) C Saavedra-Corvalán
- (Colombia) E Struvay
6
7

- (Chile) C Saavedra-Corvalán
- (Colombia) E Struvay
3
4

WC
- (Italy) N Cotto
- (Italy) S Napolitano
4
6^{4}

1
- (United States) J Cerretani
- (Canada) A Shamasdin
6
7

4
- (Argentina) JP Brzezicki
- (Brazil) M Torres
6
0
[10]

- (Colombia) JS Cabal
- (Colombia) A González
1
5

- (Belgium) N Desein
- (Australia) M Matosevic
4
6
[8]

4
- (Argentina) JP Brzezicki
- (Brazil) M Torres
2
3

- (Colombia) JS Cabal
- (Colombia) A González
7
7

- (Colombia) JS Cabal
- (Colombia) A González
6
6

WC
- (Italy) F Gaio
- (Italy) A Giannessi
6^{6}
6^{5}

1
- (United States) J Cerretani
- (Canada) A Shamasdin
6
2
[11]

- (France) O Charroin
- (France) V Stouff
4
2

2
- (Jamaica) D Brown
- (Italy) A Motti
3
6
[9]

- (Argentina) C Berlocq
- (Russia) T Gabashvili
6
6

- (Argentina) C Berlocq
- (Russia) T Gabashvili
4
2

- (Argentina) D Junqueira
- (Argentina) M Vassallo Argüello
6
6

- (Argentina) D Junqueira
- (Argentina) M Vassallo Argüello
6
6

3
- (Argentina) M Alund
- (Brazil) R Dutra da Silva
2
3

- (Argentina) D Junqueira
- (Argentina) M Vassallo Argüello
4
6^{6}

- (Germany) A Beck
- (Republic of Ireland) L Sorensen
w/o

2
- (Jamaica) D Brown
- (Italy) A Motti
6
7

- (Spain) P Andújar
- (Italy) A Arnaboldi

- (Spain) P Andújar
- (Italy) A Arnaboldi
3
4

WC
- (Italy) M Cecchinato
- (Italy) M Donati
4
7
[3]

2
- (Jamaica) D Brown
- (Italy) A Motti
6
6

2
- (Jamaica) D Brown
- (Italy) A Motti
6
6^{5}
[10]
