= 2016 Dubai Tennis Championships – Men's doubles =

Men's doubles
- 2016 Dubai Tennis Championships

Final
- Champions: (Italy) Simone Bolelli (Italy) Andreas Seppi
- Runners-up: (Spain) Feliciano López (Spain) Marc López
- Score: 6–2, 3–6, [14–12]

Details
- Draw: 16
- Seeds: 4

Events
Singles	men	women
Doubles	men	women
← 2015 ·	Dubai Tennis Championships	· 2017 →

Rohan Bopanna and Daniel Nestor were the defending champions, but chose not to compete together. Bopanna played alongside Florin Mergea, but lost in the first round to Nestor and Radek Štěpánek. Nestor and Štěpánek lost in the quarterfinals to Łukasz Kubot and Marcin Matkowski.
Simone Bolelli and Andreas Seppi won the title, defeating Feliciano López and Marc López in the final, 6–2, 3–6, [14–12].

== Seeds ==
1. (Netherlands) Jean-Julien Rojer / (Romania) Horia Tecău (quarterfinals)
2. (India) Rohan Bopanna / (Romania) Florin Mergea (first round)
3. (Canada) Vasek Pospisil / (Serbia) Nenad Zimonjić (first round)
4. (Finland) Henri Kontinen / (Australia) John Peers (first round)

== Draw ==
=== Key ===
- Q = Qualifier
- WC = Wild card
- LL = Lucky loser
- Alt = Alternate
- SE = Special exempt
- PR = Protected ranking
- ITF = ITF entry
- JE = Junior exempt
- w/o = Walkover
- r = Retired
- d = Defaulted
- SR = Special ranking

=== Draw ===
First round
1	(Netherlands) J-J Rojer (Romania) H Tecău	6	7
(Spain) G García-López (Serbia) V Troicki	2	5
(United Kingdom) D Inglot (Sweden) R Lindstedt	6^{3}	3
(Spain) F López (Spain) M López	7^{7}	6
3	(Canada) V Pospisil (Serbia) N Zimonjić	4	4
Q	(South Korea) H Chung (Czech Republic) J Veselý	6	6
(Spain) R Bautista Agut (Portugal) J Sousa	2	6	[10]
WC	(Ukraine) S Bubka (Ukraine) S Stakhovsky	6	2	[8]
WC	(India) M Bhupathi (Pakistan) A-u-H Qureshi	4	2
(Italy) S Bolelli (Italy) A Seppi	6	6
(United Kingdom) J Murray (Spain) T Robredo	2	6	[10]
4	(Finland) H Kontinen (Australia) J Peers	6	4	[8]
(Croatia) I Dodig (Croatia) M Draganja	6	4	[7]
(Poland) Ł Kubot (Poland) M Matkowski	4	6	[10]
(Canada) D Nestor (Czech Republic) R Štěpánek	3	7^{8}	[10]
2	(India) R Bopanna (Romania) F Mergea	6	6^{6}	[4]

Quarterfinals
1	(Netherlands) J-J Rojer (Romania) H Tecău	4	4
(Spain) F López (Spain) M López	6	6
Q	(South Korea) H Chung (Czech Republic) J Veselý	6^{2}	7^{8}	[11]
(Spain) R Bautista Agut (Portugal) J Sousa	7^{7}	6^{6}	[9]
(Italy) S Bolelli (Italy) A Seppi	6	6
(United Kingdom) J Murray (Spain) T Robredo	4	3
(Poland) Ł Kubot (Poland) M Matkowski	3	6	[10]
(Canada) D Nestor (Czech Republic) R Štěpánek	6	3	[5]

Semifinals
(Spain) F López (Spain) M López	6	7^{8}
Q	(South Korea) H Chung (Czech Republic) J Veselý	4	6^{6}
(Italy) S Bolelli (Italy) A Seppi	6	6
(Poland) Ł Kubot (Poland) M Matkowski	4	4

Final
(Spain) F López (Spain) M López	2	6	[12]
(Italy) S Bolelli (Italy) A Seppi	6	3	[14]

== Qualifying ==
=== Seeds ===
1. (Australia) Rameez Junaid / (United Kingdom) Jonathan Marray (first round)
2. (Argentina) Leonardo Mayer / (Czech Republic) Lukáš Rosol (first round)

=== Qualifiers ===
1. (South Korea) Hyeon Chung / (Czech Republic) Jiří Veselý

=== Qualifying draw ===
First round
1	(Australia) Rameez Junaid (United Kingdom) Jonathan Marray	4	6	[7]
(South Korea) Hyeon Chung (Czech Republic) Jiří Veselý	6	3	[10]
(Italy) Thomas Fabbiano (Croatia) Franko Škugor	6	2	[10]
2	(Argentina) Leonardo Mayer (Czech Republic) Lukáš Rosol	4	6	[7]

Qualifying competition
(South Korea) Hyeon Chung (Czech Republic) Jiří Veselý	6	6
(Italy) Thomas Fabbiano (Croatia) Franko Škugor	3	4
