= 2010 Canella Challenger – Singles =

Singles
- 2010 Canella Challenger

Final
- Champion: (Germany) Björn Phau
- Runner-up: (Italy) Simone Bolelli
- Score: 6–4, 6–2

Events
Singles	Doubles
- Canella Challenger

Björn Phau won in the final 6–4, 6–2, against Simone Bolelli.

== Seeds ==
1. (Italy) Potito Starace (second round)
2. (Germany) Andreas Beck (second round)
3. (Italy) Paolo Lorenzi (quarterfinals)
4. (Jamaica) Dustin Brown (first round)
5. (Italy) Simone Bolelli (final)
6. (Russia) Teymuraz Gabashvili (semifinals)
7. (Germany) Björn Phau (champion)
8. (Spain) Pablo Andújar (quarterfinals)

== Draw ==
Key

- Q = Qualifier
- WC = Wild card
- LL = Lucky loser
- Alt = Alternate
- ITF = ITF entry
- PR = Protected ranking
- SR = Special ranking
- SE = Special exempt
- JE = Junior exempt
- JR = Junior Accelerator Programme entrant
- CO = College Accelerator Programme entrant
- NG = Next Gen Accelerator Program entrant
- w/o = Walkover
- r = Retired
- d = Defaulted

=== Finals ===
Semifinals
6	(Russia) Teymuraz Gabashvili	6	4
5	(Italy) Simone Bolelli	7	6
7	(Germany) Björn Phau	7	4	6
(Germany) Dieter Kindlmann	6^{3}	6	1

Final
5	(Italy) Simone Bolelli	4	2
7	(Germany) Björn Phau	6	6

=== Top half ===
First round
1	(Italy) P Starace	7	7
(Argentina) C Berlocq	6^{0}	5
(Argentina) JP Brzezicki	7	6^{5}	6
(Czech Republic) J Minář	6^{5}	7	3
(Ukraine) I Sergeyev	6^{3}	6	6^{8}
(Belarus) U Ignatik	7	4	7
(Argentina) D Junqueira	3	0
6	(Russia) T Gabashvili	6	6
3/WC	(Italy) P Lorenzi	6	4	6
Q	(Argentina) M Alund	4	6	2
WC	(Italy) E Fioravante	6	6^{3}	6
WC	(Italy) F Gaio	0	7	3
(Romania) A Ungur	6	3	3
(Germany) J Reister	3	6	6
Q	(Spain) S Gutiérrez-Ferrol	4	6^{5}
5	(Italy) S Bolelli	6	7

Second round
1	(Italy) P Starace	6	3	2
(Argentina) JP Brzezicki	2	6	6
(Belarus) U Ignatik	6^{2}	4
6	(Russia) T Gabashvili	7	6
3/WC	(Italy) P Lorenzi	7	6
WC	(Italy) E Fioravante	5	0
(Germany) J Reister	5	6	6^{5}
5	(Italy) S Bolelli	7	4	7

Quarterfinals
(Argentina) JP Brzezicki	4	4
6	(Russia) T Gabashvili	6	6
3/WC	(Italy) P Lorenzi	2	6	3
5	(Italy) S Bolelli	6	2	6

Semifinals
6	(Russia) T Gabashvili	6	4
5	(Italy) S Bolelli	7	6

=== Bottom half ===
First round
7	(Germany) B Phau	6	2	7
Q	(Italy) A Brizzi	3	6	5
(Germany) T Kamke	7	4	6
(Argentina) M Vassallo Argüello	5	6	2
ALT	(Republic of Ireland) L Sorensen	3	7	6
LL	(Italy) A Arnaboldi	6	6^{1}	4
(Belgium) Y Mertens	6	7
4	(Jamaica) D Brown	4	5
8	(Spain) P Andújar	6	6
WC	(Italy) S Napolitano	0	1
(Switzerland) M Lammer	6	3	2
(Belgium) N Desein	2	6	6
(France) L Recouderc	2	5
(Germany) D Kindlmann	6	7
Q	(Italy) G Naso	2	6	2
2	(Germany) A Beck	6	4	6

Second round
7	(Germany) B Phau	6	6
(Germany) T Kamke	3	0
ALT	(Republic of Ireland) L Sorensen	6	6^{2}	2
(Belgium) Y Mertens	1	7	6
8	(Spain) P Andújar	6	6
(Belgium) N Desein	2	4
(Germany) D Kindlmann	6	3	7
2	(Germany) A Beck	2	6	5

Quarterfinals
7	(Germany) B Phau	6	6
(Belgium) Y Mertens	3	3
8	(Spain) P Andújar	1	5
(Germany) D Kindlmann	6	7

Semifinals
7	(Germany) B Phau	7	4	6
(Germany) D Kindlmann	6^{3}	6	1
