= 2016 Dubai Tennis Championships – Women's singles =

Women's singles
- 2016 Dubai Tennis Championships

Final
- Champion: (Italy) Sara Errani
- Runner-up: (Czech Republic) Barbora Strýcová
- Score: 6–0, 6–2

Details
- Draw: 28
- Seeds: 8

Events
Singles	men	women
Doubles	men	women
- Dubai Tennis Championships

Sara Errani defeated Barbora Strýcová in the final, 6–0, 6–2 to win the women's singles tennis title at the 2016 Dubai Tennis Championships.

Simona Halep was the defending champion, but lost to Ana Ivanovic in the second round.

This was the first time at either a WTA Tour or ATP Tour event that all seeded players lost their opening match.

== Seeds ==
The top four seeds received a bye into the second round.

1. (Romania) Simona Halep (second round)
2. (Spain) Garbiñe Muguruza (second round)
3. (Spain) Carla Suárez Navarro (second round)
4. (Czech Republic) Petra Kvitová (second round)
5. (Switzerland) Belinda Bencic (first round)
6. (Czech Republic) Karolína Plíšková (first round)
7. (Italy) Roberta Vinci (first round)
8. (Russia) Svetlana Kuznetsova (first round)

== Draw ==
Key

- Q = Qualifier
- WC = Wild card
- LL = Lucky loser
- Alt = Alternate
- ITF = ITF entry
- PR = Protected ranking
- SR = Special ranking
- SE = Special exempt
- JE = Junior exempt
- JR = Junior Accelerator Programme entrant
- CO = College Accelerator Programme entrant
- NG = Next Gen Accelerator Program entrant
- w/o = Walkover
- r = Retired
- d = Defaulted

=== Finals ===
Semifinals
(Czech Republic) Barbora Strýcová	6	3	6
(France) Caroline Garcia	2	6	3
(Italy) Sara Errani	6	6
(Ukraine) Elina Svitolina	4	4

Final
(Czech Republic) Barbora Strýcová	0	2
(Italy) Sara Errani	6	6

=== Top half ===
First round
(Serbia) A Ivanovic	6	6
(Australia) D Gavrilova	1	0
(Czech Republic) B Strýcová	6	6
Q	(Bulgaria) T Pironkova	4	3
WC	(Germany) J Görges	6	6
8	(Russia) S Kuznetsova	0	1
(Slovakia) AK Schmiedlová	4	1
(France) C Garcia	6	6
(Italy) C Giorgi	2	1
(Germany) A Petkovic	6	6
(Serbia) J Janković	4	7	6
5	(Switzerland) B Bencic	6	5	4

Second round
1/WC	(Romania) S Halep	6^{2}	2
(Serbia) A Ivanovic	7^{7}	6
(Czech Republic) B Strýcová	2	6	6
WC	(Germany) J Görges	6	3	1
3	(Spain) C Suárez Navarro	6	4	3
(France) C Garcia	4	6	6
(Germany) A Petkovic	6	6
(Serbia) J Janković	3	2

Quarterfinals
(Serbia) A Ivanovic	6^{5}	3
(Czech Republic) B Strýcová	7^{7}	6
(France) C Garcia	6	6
(Germany) A Petkovic	3	4

Semifinals
(Czech Republic) B Strýcová	6	3	6
(France) C Garcia	2	6	3

=== Bottom half ===
First round
7	(Italy) R Vinci	0	6	3
Q	(Kazakhstan) Y Shvedova	6	4	6
Q	(China) S Zheng	5	3
(Italy) S Errani	7	6
(United States) M Brengle	6	7
(Russia) E Makarova	4	5
6/WC	(Czech Republic) Ka Plíšková	6^{5}	1
(United States) C Vandeweghe	7^{7}	6
(Ukraine) L Tsurenko	2	6^{1}
(France) K Mladenovic	6	7^{7}
(Ukraine) E Svitolina	6	6
Q	(Slovakia) J Čepelová	3	1

Second round
Q	(Kazakhstan) Y Shvedova	3	0
(Italy) S Errani	6	6
(United States) M Brengle	0	7^{7}	6
4/WC	(Czech Republic) P Kvitová	6	6^{1}	3
(United States) C Vandeweghe	7	3	6
(France) K Mladenovic	5	6	4
(Ukraine) E Svitolina	7^{7}	6
2	(Spain) G Muguruza	6^{3}	3

Quarterfinals
(Italy) S Errani	4	6	6
(United States) M Brengle	6	1	4
(United States) C Vandeweghe	4	6	2
(Ukraine) E Svitolina	6	1	6

Semifinals
(Italy) S Errani	6	6
(Ukraine) E Svitolina	4	4

== Qualifying ==
=== Seeds ===
1. (United States) Varvara Lepchenko (qualifying competition)
2. (Germany) Anna-Lena Friedsam (qualifying competition)
3. (Japan) Nao Hibino (first round)
4. (Czech Republic) Denisa Allertová (qualifying competition)
5. (Kazakhstan) Zarina Diyas (first round)
6. (China) Zheng Saisai (qualified)
7. (Czech Republic) Lucie Hradecká (withdrew due to change of schedule)
8. (Ukraine) Kateryna Bondarenko (second round)
9. (Germany) Carina Witthöft (first round)

=== Qualifiers ===
1. (China) Zheng Saisai
2. (Bulgaria) Tsvetana Pironkova
3. (Slovakia) Jana Čepelová
4. (Kazakhstan) Yaroslava Shvedova

=== Qualifying draw ===
==== First qualifier ====
First round
1	(United States) Varvara Lepchenko	6	6
WC	(Tunisia) Ons Jabeur	4	1
PR	(Spain) María José Martínez Sánchez	4	6	0
(Bulgaria) Sesil Karatantcheva	6	4	6
(Czech Republic) Andrea Hlaváčková	7^{7}	2	6
(Poland) Magda Linette	6^{3}	6	2
(Turkey) Çağla Büyükakçay	1	0
6	(China) Zheng Saisai	6	6

Second round
1	(United States) Varvara Lepchenko	6	7^{7}
(Bulgaria) Sesil Karatantcheva	0	6^{1}
(Czech Republic) Andrea Hlaváčková	6	3	0
6	(China) Zheng Saisai	1	6	6

Qualifying competition
1	(United States) Varvara Lepchenko	5	1
6	(China) Zheng Saisai	7	6

==== Second qualifier ====
First round
2	(Germany) Anna-Lena Friedsam	7	6
(Russia) Evgeniya Rodina	5	1
(China) Wang Qiang	6	6
WC	(Oman) Fatma Al-Nabhani	4	4
(Czech Republic) Kristýna Plíšková	1	6^{4}
(Bulgaria) Tsvetana Pironkova	6	7^{7}
(Latvia) Anastasija Sevastova	3	3
8	(Ukraine) Kateryna Bondarenko	6	6

Second round
2	(Germany) Anna-Lena Friedsam	7^{7}	2	7^{8}
(China) Wang Qiang	6^{2}	6	6^{6}
(Bulgaria) Tsvetana Pironkova	6	6
8	(Ukraine) Kateryna Bondarenko	2	1

Qualifying competition
2	(Germany) Anna-Lena Friedsam	7	5	3
(Bulgaria) Tsvetana Pironkova	5	7	6

==== Third qualifier ====
First round
3	(Japan) Nao Hibino	4	4
(Latvia) Jeļena Ostapenko	6	6
(United States) Bethanie Mattek-Sands	6	6
(Croatia) Ana Konjuh	2	3
(United States) Alison Riske	6	6
(Belarus) Aliaksandra Sasnovich	3	2
(Slovakia) Jana Čepelová	6^{13}	6	6
9	(Germany) Carina Witthöft	7^{15}	2	4

Second round
(Latvia) Jeļena Ostapenko	3	3
(United States) Bethanie Mattek-Sands	6	6
(United States) Alison Riske	3	7^{7}	5
(Slovakia) Jana Čepelová	6	6^{1}	7

Qualifying competition
(United States) Bethanie Mattek-Sands	4	6	3
(Slovakia) Jana Čepelová	6	1	6

==== Fourth qualifier ====
First round
4	(Czech Republic) Denisa Allertová	6	6
Alt	(Canada) Gabriela Dabrowski	2	3
(Czech Republic) Kateřina Siniaková	6	6
(Ukraine) Olga Savchuk	2	2
(Slovakia) Kristína Kučová	3	6	2
(China) Wang Yafan	6	4	6
(Kazakhstan) Yaroslava Shvedova	6	3	6
5	(Kazakhstan) Zarina Diyas	4	6	4

Second round
4	(Czech Republic) Denisa Allertová	6	6
(Czech Republic) Kateřina Siniaková	4	3
(China) Wang Yafan	0	3
(Kazakhstan) Yaroslava Shvedova	6	6

Qualifying competition
4	(Czech Republic) Denisa Allertová	4	6	6^{6}
(Kazakhstan) Yaroslava Shvedova	6	4	7^{8}
