= 2021 Mallorca Championships – Doubles =

Doubles
- 2021 Mallorca Championships

Final
- Champion: (Italy) Simone Bolelli (Argentina) Máximo González
- Runner-up: (Serbia) Novak Djokovic (Spain) Carlos Gómez-Herrera
- Score: Walkover

Events
Singles	Doubles
Mallorca Championships	· 2022 →

Simone Bolelli and Máximo González defeated Novak Djokovic and Carlos Gómez-Herrera by virtue of walkover to win the doubles tennis title at the 2021 Mallorca Championships after a foot injury sustained by Gómez-Herrera forced him and Djokovic to withdraw before the final match. It marked Bolelli and González's third title of the season together.

This was the inaugural edition of the tournament.

== Seeds ==
1. (Spain) Marcel Granollers / (Argentina) Horacio Zeballos (quarterfinals)
2. (New Zealand) Marcus Daniell / (Austria) Philipp Oswald (semifinals)
3. (Austria) Oliver Marach / (Pakistan) Aisam-ul-Haq Qureshi (semifinals)
4. (Italy) Simone Bolelli / (Argentina) Máximo González (champions)

== Draw ==
=== Key ===
- Q = Qualifier
- WC = Wild card
- LL = Lucky loser
- Alt = Alternate
- SE = Special exempt
- PR = Protected ranking
- ITF = ITF entry
- JE = Junior exempt
- w/o = Walkover
- r = Retired
- d = Defaulted
- SR = Special ranking

=== Draw ===
First round
1	(Spain) M Granollers (Argentina) H Zeballos	6	3	[12]
PR	(Czech Republic) R Jebavý (Czech Republic) J Veselý	2	6	[10]
WC	(Serbia) N Djokovic (Spain) C Gómez-Herrera	5	6	[13]
(Bosnia and Herzegovina) T Brkić (Serbia) N Ćaćić	7	4	[11]
3	(Austria) O Marach (Pakistan) A-u-H Qureshi	6^{4}	6	[10]
(Sweden) A Göransson (Norway) C Ruud	7^{7}	4	[8]
(Brazil) M Demoliner (Mexico) S González	6^{4}	6	[2]
(France) A Mannarino (Mexico) MÁ Reyes-Varela	7^{7}	4	[10]
(Argentina) A Molteni (Italy) A Vavassori	7^{7}	7^{8}
Alt	(Argentina) G Pella (Portugal) J Sousa	6^{3}	6^{6}
(United States) A Krajicek (United States) T Sandgren	4	6^{1}
4	(Italy) S Bolelli (Argentina) M González	6	7^{7}
WC	(Spain) M López (Spain) J Munar	2	2
(Israel) J Erlich (Belarus) A Vasilevski	6	6
(Netherlands) S Arends (Netherlands) M Middelkoop	3	2
2	(New Zealand) M Daniell (Austria) P Oswald	6	6

Quarterfinals
1	(Spain) M Granollers (Argentina) H Zeballos	6	6^{3}	[8]
WC	(Serbia) N Djokovic (Spain) C Gómez-Herrera	4	7^{7}	[10]
3	(Austria) O Marach (Pakistan) A-u-H Qureshi	6	6
(France) A Mannarino (Mexico) MÁ Reyes-Varela	3	4
(Argentina) A Molteni (Italy) A Vavassori	6^{3}	7^{9}	[7]
4	(Italy) S Bolelli (Argentina) M González	7^{7}	6^{7}	[10]
(Israel) J Erlich (Belarus) A Vasilevski	4	2
2	(New Zealand) M Daniell (Austria) P Oswald	6	6

Semifinals
WC	(Serbia) N Djokovic (Spain) C Gómez-Herrera	6	7^{7}
3	(Austria) O Marach (Pakistan) A-u-H Qureshi	3	6^{4}
4	(Italy) S Bolelli (Argentina) M González	6	7
2	(New Zealand) M Daniell (Austria) P Oswald	1	5

Final
WC	(Serbia) N Djokovic (Spain) C Gómez-Herrera
4	(Italy) S Bolelli (Argentina) M González	w/o
