= 2013 Trofeo Faip–Perrel – Singles =

Perrel – Singles
- 2013 Trofeo Faip–Perrel

Final
- Champion: (Poland) Michał Przysiężny
- Runner-up: (Germany) Jan-Lennard Struff
- Score: 4–6, 7–6^{(7–5)}, 7–6^{(7–5)}

Events
Singles	Doubles
- Trofeo Faip–Perrel

Björn Phau was the defending champion but decided not to participate.
Michał Przysiężny defeated Jan-Lennard Struff 4–6, 7–6^{(7–5)}, 7–6^{(7–5)} in the final to win the title.

== Seeds ==
1. (Latvia) Ernests Gulbis (first round)
2. (Germany) Jan-Lennard Struff (final)
3. (Switzerland) Marco Chiudinelli (second round)
4. (Belarus) Uladzimir Ignatik (first round)
5. (Belgium) Maxime Authom (first round)
6. (Slovakia) Karol Beck (first round)
7. (Romania) Marius Copil (first round)
8. (Ukraine) Ivan Sergeyev (first round)

== Draw ==
Key

- Q = Qualifier
- WC = Wild card
- LL = Lucky loser
- Alt = Alternate
- ITF = ITF entry
- PR = Protected ranking
- SR = Special ranking
- SE = Special exempt
- JE = Junior exempt
- JR = Junior Accelerator Programme entrant
- CO = College Accelerator Programme entrant
- NG = Next Gen Accelerator Program entrant
- w/o = Walkover
- r = Retired
- d = Defaulted

=== Finals ===
Semifinals
(Poland) Michał Przysiężny	5	6	6
Q	(Italy) Viktor Galović	7	3	4
(Germany) Peter Gojowczyk	4	4
2	(Germany) Jan-Lennard Struff	6	6

Final
(Poland) Michał Przysiężny	4	7^{7}	7^{7}
2	(Germany) Jan-Lennard Struff	6	6^{5}	6^{5}

=== Top half ===
First round
1/WC	(Latvia) E Gulbis	4	6^{4}
(Poland) M Przysiężny	6	7^{7}
(Czech Republic) D Lojda	6	3	4
(Czech Republic) I Minář	4	6	6
WC	(Serbia) D Djokovic	6	3	2
(Moldova) R Albot	3	6	6
(Uzbekistan) F Dustov	7^{7}	6^{3}	6
5	(Belgium) M Authom	6^{3}	7^{7}	3
3	(Switzerland) M Chiudinelli	6	6
(Germany) D Meffert	4	4
(Germany) B Knittel	6	7^{12}
(Slovakia) A Martin	2	6^{10}
WC	(Italy) C Grassi	6^{4}	3
Q	(Italy) V Galović	7^{7}	6
LL	(Italy) M Cecchinato	6	6
8	(Ukraine) I Sergeyev	1	1

Second round
(Poland) M Przysiężny	7^{7}	7^{7}
(Czech Republic) I Minář	6^{1}	6^{5}
(Moldova) R Albot	4	7^{7}	6^{4}
(Uzbekistan) F Dustov	6	6^{5}	7^{7}
3	(Switzerland) M Chiudinelli	6	3	5
(Germany) B Knittel	3	6	7
Q	(Italy) V Galović	7^{7}	6
LL	(Italy) M Cecchinato	6^{4}	2

Quarterfinals
(Poland) M Przysiężny	4	7^{7}	7^{12}
(Uzbekistan) F Dustov	6	6^{3}	6^{10}
(Germany) B Knittel	6	3	1^{r}
Q	(Italy) V Galović	4	6	2

Semifinals
(Poland) M Przysiężny	5	6	6
Q	(Italy) V Galović	7	3	4

=== Bottom half ===
First round
7	(Romania) M Copil	3	3
(Germany) P Gojowczyk	6	6
(Czech Republic) J Mertl	6^{3}	3
(Netherlands) J Huta Galung	7^{7}	6
(Israel) A Weintraub	4	6^{5}
(Belgium) N Desein	6	7^{7}
PR	(Germany) A Beck	6	6
4	(Belarus) U Ignatik	4	4
6	(Slovakia) K Beck	3	4
(France) M Teixeira	6	6
WC	(Sweden) A Vinciguerra	0	6	7^{7}
Q	(Austria) M Fischer	6	3	6^{4}
(Ukraine) O Nedovyesov	6	6
Q	(Italy) A Bega	2	4
Q	(Georgia (country)) N Basilashvili	1	0^{r}
2	(Germany) J-L Struff	6	2

Second round
(Germany) P Gojowczyk	7	6
(Netherlands) J Huta Galung	5	3
(Belgium) N Desein	5	7	5
PR	(Germany) A Beck	7	5	7
(France) M Teixeira	5	6^{5}
WC	(Sweden) A Vinciguerra	7	7^{7}
(Ukraine) O Nedovyesov	6^{8}	4
2	(Germany) J-L Struff	7^{10}	6

Quarterfinals
(Germany) P Gojowczyk	6	7
PR	(Germany) A Beck	3	5
WC	(Sweden) A Vinciguerra	6^{6}	6^{6}
2	(Germany) J-L Struff	7^{8}	7^{8}

Semifinals
(Germany) P Gojowczyk	4	4
2	(Germany) J-L Struff	6	6
