= 2016 Dubai Tennis Championships – Women's doubles =

Women's doubles
- 2016 Dubai Tennis Championships

Final
- Champions: (Chinese Taipei) Chuang Chia-jung (Croatia) Darija Jurak
- Runners-up: (France) Caroline Garcia (France) Kristina Mladenovic
- Score: 6–4, 6–4

Events
Singles	men	women
Doubles	men	women
- Dubai Tennis Championships

Tímea Babos and Kristina Mladenovic were the defending champions, but chose not to compete together. Babos played alongside Julia Görges, but lost in the semifinals to Caroline Garcia and Mladenovic.
Chuang Chia-jung and Darija Jurak won the title, defeating Garcia and Mladenovic in the final, 6–4, 6–4.

== Seeds ==
1. (United States) Bethanie Mattek-Sands / (Kazakhstan) Yaroslava Shvedova (first round)
2. (France) Caroline Garcia / (France) Kristina Mladenovic (final)
3. (Czech Republic) Andrea Hlaváčková / (Czech Republic) Lucie Hradecká (first round)
4. (Hungary) Tímea Babos / (Germany) Julia Görges (semifinals)

== Draw ==
Key

- Q = Qualifier
- WC = Wild card
- LL = Lucky loser
- Alt = Alternate
- ITF = ITF entry
- PR = Protected ranking
- SR = Special ranking
- SE = Special exempt
- JE = Junior exempt
- JR = Junior Accelerator Programme entrant
- CO = College Accelerator Programme entrant
- NG = Next Gen Accelerator Program entrant
- w/o = Walkover
- r = Retired
- d = Defaulted

First round
1	(United States) B Mattek-Sands (Kazakhstan) Y Shvedova	0	6	[6]
(Italy) S Errani (Spain) C Suárez Navarro	6	4	[10]
(China) Y Xu (China) S Zheng	4	6	[10]
WC	(Oman) F Al-Nabhani (Bulgaria) T Pironkova	6	2	[8]
3	(Czech Republic) A Hlaváčková (Czech Republic) L Hradecká	7	6^{3}	[8]
(Slovenia) A Klepač (Slovenia) K Srebotnik	5	7^{7}	[10]
(Chinese Taipei) C-j Chuang (Croatia) D Jurak	4	6	[10]
(China) C Liang (China) Y Wang	6	2	[4]
(Russia) V Dushevina (Czech Republic) K Siniaková	5	3
(Canada) G Dabrowski (Spain) MJ Martínez Sánchez	7	6
(Czech Republic) B Strýcová (Italy) R Vinci	3	6	[9]
4	(Hungary) T Babos (Germany) J Görges	6	3	[11]
WC	(Czech Republic) P Kvitová (Poland) A Rosolska	3	0
(Germany) A-L Grönefeld (United States) C Vandeweghe	6	6
(United States) R Atawo (United States) A Spears	2	3
2	(France) C Garcia (France) K Mladenovic	6	6

Quarterfinals
(Italy) S Errani (Spain) C Suárez Navarro	6	6
(China) Y Xu (China) S Zheng	4	3
(Slovenia) A Klepač (Slovenia) K Srebotnik	1	6	[10]
(Chinese Taipei) C-j Chuang (Croatia) D Jurak	6	4	[12]
(Canada) G Dabrowski (Spain) MJ Martínez Sánchez	4	1
4	(Hungary) T Babos (Germany) J Görges	6	6
(Germany) A-L Grönefeld (United States) C Vandeweghe	3	1
2	(France) C Garcia (France) K Mladenovic	6	6

Semifinals
(Italy) S Errani (Spain) C Suárez Navarro	7	6^{5}	[7]
(Chinese Taipei) C-j Chuang (Croatia) D Jurak	5	7^{7}	[10]
4	(Hungary) T Babos (Germany) J Görges	3	4
2	(France) C Garcia (France) K Mladenovic	6	6

Final
(Chinese Taipei) C-j Chuang (Croatia) D Jurak	6	6
2	(France) C Garcia (France) K Mladenovic	4	4
