= 2012 Internazionali Trofeo Lame Perrel–Faip =

- Date: 13–19 February
- Edition: 7th
- Location: Bergamo, Italy

Champions

Singles
- (Germany) Björn Phau

Doubles
- (United Kingdom) Jamie Delgado / (United Kingdom) Ken Skupski
← 2011 ·	ATP Challenger Bergamo	· 2013 →

The 2012 Internazionali Trofeo Lame Perrel–Faip was a professional tennis tournament played on hard courts. It was the seventh edition of the tournament which was part of the 2012 ATP Challenger Tour. It took place in Bergamo, Italy between 13 and 19 February 2012.

== Singles main-draw entrants ==
=== Seeds ===
Country	Player	Rank^{1}	Seed
JPN	Go Soeda	90	1
SVN	Grega Žemlja	111	2
TUN	Malek Jaziri	117	3
SVK	Martin Kližan	120	4
EST	Jürgen Zopp	121	5
KAZ	Andrey Golubev	132	6
GER	Björn Phau	133	7
ESP	Pablo Carreño Busta	147	8

- ^{1} Rankings are as of February 6, 2012.

=== Other entrants ===
The following players received wildcards into the singles main draw:

- (Italy) Andrea Arnaboldi
- (Germany) Benjamin Becker
- (Italy) Marco Crugnola
- (Italy) Claudio Grassi

The following players received entry as an alternate into the singles main draw:

- (Bosnia and Herzegovina) Amer Delić
- (Austria) Martin Fischer

The following players received entry from the qualifying draw:

- (France) Grégoire Burquier
- (Romania) Marius Copil
- (Belgium) Julien Dubail
- (France) Albano Olivetti
- (Belgium) Maxime Authom (Lucky loser)

== Champions ==
=== Singles ===
(Germany) Björn Phau def. (Russia) Alexander Kudryavtsev, 6–4, 6–4

=== Doubles ===
(United Kingdom) Jamie Delgado / (United Kingdom) Ken Skupski def. (Austria) Martin Fischer / (Austria) Philipp Oswald, 7–5, 7–5
