= 2021 Mallorca Championships =

- Date: 19–26 June
- Edition: 1st
- Category: ATP Tour 250
- Draw: 28S / 16D
- Prize money: €720,000
- Surface: Grass
- Location: Santa Ponsa, Spain
- Venue: Santa Ponsa Tennis Academy

Champions

Singles
- (Russia) Daniil Medvedev

Doubles
- (Italy) Simone Bolelli / (Argentina) Máximo González
Mallorca Championships	· 2022 →

The 2021 Mallorca Championships was a men's tennis tournament played on outdoor grass courts. It was the inaugural edition of the Mallorca Championships, and part of the ATP Tour 250 series of the 2021 ATP Tour. It was held at the Santa Ponsa Tennis Academy in Santa Ponsa, Spain, from 19 June until 26 June 2021.

== Champions ==
=== Singles ===
- (Russia) Daniil Medvedev defeated (United States) Sam Querrey, 6–4, 6–2.

=== Doubles ===
- (Italy) Simone Bolelli / (Argentina) Máximo González defeated (Serbia) Novak Djokovic / (Spain) Carlos Gómez-Herrera, walkover

== Points and prize money ==
=== Point distribution ===
Event	W	F	SF	QF	Round of 16	Round of 32	Q	Q2	Q1
Singles	250	150	90	45	20	0	12	6	0
Doubles	250	150	90	45	0	—	—	—	—

=== Prize money ===
Event	W	F	SF	QF	Round of 16	Round of 32	Q2	Q1
Singles	€70,620	€50,630	€36,040	€24,030	€15,450	€9,295	€4,540	€2,360
Doubles*	€26,370	€18,880	€12,440	€8,080	€4,740	—	—	—

_{*per team}

== ATP singles main draw entrants ==
=== Seeds ===
Country	Player	Rank^{1}	Seed
RUS	Daniil Medvedev	2	1
AUT	Dominic Thiem	5	2
ESP	Roberto Bautista Agut	10	3
ESP	Pablo Carreño Busta	12	4
NOR	Casper Ruud	15	5
RUS	Karen Khachanov	27	6
FRA	Ugo Humbert	31	7
SRB	Dušan Lajović	40	8

- ^{1} Rankings are as of 14 June 2021.

=== Other entrants ===
The following players received wildcards into the main draw:

- (Spain) Roberto Bautista Agut
- (Russia) Daniil Medvedev
- (Austria) Dominic Thiem

The following players received entry from the qualifying draw:

- (Spain) Roberto Carballés Baena
- (Slovakia) Lukáš Klein
- (Spain) Nicola Kuhn
- (France) Lucas Pouille

=== Withdrawals ===
Before the tournament

- (France) Jérémy Chardy → replaced by (Italy) Stefano Travaglia
- (Argentina) Federico Delbonis → replaced by (France) Corentin Moutet
- (Australia) Nick Kyrgios → replaced by (Czech Republic) Jiří Veselý

During the tournament

- (France) Ugo Humbert

=== Retirements ===
- (Austria) Dominic Thiem

== ATP doubles main draw entrants ==
=== Seeds ===
Country	Player	Country	Player	Rank^{1}	Seed
ESP	Marcel Granollers	ARG	Horacio Zeballos	18	1
NZL	Marcus Daniell	AUT	Philipp Oswald	82	2
AUT	Oliver Marach	PAK	Aisam-ul-Haq Qureshi	85	3
ITA	Simone Bolelli	ARG	Máximo González	91	4

- ^{1} Rankings are as of June 14, 2021.

=== Other entrants ===
The following pairs received wildcards into the doubles main draw:

- (Serbia) Novak Djokovic / (Spain) Carlos Gómez-Herrera
- (Spain) Marc López / (Spain) Jaume Munar

The following pair received entry as an alternate:

- (Argentina) Guido Pella / (Portugal) João Sousa

=== Withdrawals ===
Before the tournament

- (Netherlands) Wesley Koolhof / (Netherlands) Jean-Julien Rojer → replaced by (Israel) Jonathan Erlich / (Belarus) Andrei Vasilevski
- (Germany) Tim Pütz / (New Zealand) Michael Venus → replaced by (France) Adrian Mannarino / (Mexico) Miguel Ángel Reyes Varela
- (Belgium) Sander Gillé / (Belgium) Joran Vliegen → replaced by (Czech Republic) Roman Jebavý / (Czech Republic) Jiří Veselý
- (Spain) Pablo Andújar / (Spain) Pablo Carreño Busta → replaced by (Argentina) Guido Pella / (Portugal) João Sousa

During the tournament

- (Serbia) Novak Djokovic / (Spain) Carlos Gómez-Herrera
