= 2021 Mallorca Championships – Singles =

Singles
- 2021 Mallorca Championships

Final
- Champion: (Russia) Daniil Medvedev
- Runner-up: (United States) Sam Querrey
- Score: 6–4, 6–2

Details
- Draw: 28 (4 Q / 3 WC )
- Seeds: 8

Events
Singles	Doubles
Mallorca Championships	· 2022 →

Daniil Medvedev defeated Sam Querrey in the final, 6–4, 6–2, to win the singles tennis title at the 2021 Mallorca Championships. It was Medvedev's first career grass court final. Querrey was contesting for his first title in four years.

This was the inaugural edition of the tournament.

== Seeds ==
The top four seeds received a bye into the second round.

1. (Russia) Daniil Medvedev (champion)
2. (Austria) Dominic Thiem (second round, retired due to wrist injury)
3. (Spain) Roberto Bautista Agut (quarterfinals)
4. (Spain) Pablo Carreño Busta (semifinals)
5. (Norway) Casper Ruud (quarterfinals)
6. (Russia) Karen Khachanov (second round)
7. (France) Ugo Humbert (second round, withdrew due to food poisoning)
8. (Serbia) Dušan Lajović (first round)

== Draw ==
=== Key ===
- Q = Qualifier
- WC = Wild card
- LL = Lucky loser
- Alt = Alternate
- SE = Special exempt
- PR = Protected ranking
- ITF = ITF entry
- JE = Junior exempt
- w/o = Walkover
- r = Retired
- d = Defaulted
- SR = Special ranking

=== Finals ===
Semifinals
1/WC	(Russia) Daniil Medvedev	3	6	6
4	(Spain) Pablo Carreño Busta	6	3	2
(United States) Sam Querrey	6	6
(France) Adrian Mannarino	4	3

Final
1/WC	(Russia) Daniil Medvedev	6	6
(United States) Sam Querrey	4	2

=== Top half ===
First round
(South Africa) L Harris	4	2
(France) C Moutet	6	6
(Spain) J Munar	6^{3}	5
(United States) T Sandgren	7^{7}	7
(France) G Simon	4	6^{4}
5	(Norway) C Ruud	6	7^{7}
(Czech Republic) J Veselý	7^{7}	6
(Italy) S Caruso	6^{2}	2
(Australia) J Thompson	2	7^{7}	6
(Spain) P Andújar	6	6^{4}	2
Q	(Slovakia) L Klein	6	7^{7}
8	(Serbia) D Lajović	4	6^{2}

Second round
1/WC	(Russia) D Medvedev	6	6
(France) C Moutet	4	2
(United States) T Sandgren	3	4
5	(Norway) C Ruud	6	6
4	(Spain) P Carreño Busta	6	6
(Czech Republic) J Veselý	4	4
(Australia) J Thompson	6	6
Q	(Slovakia) L Klein	4	4

Quarterfinals
1/WC	(Russia) D Medvedev	7	6
5	(Norway) C Ruud	5	1
4	(Spain) P Carreño Busta	6	6
(Australia) J Thompson	4	4

Semifinals
1/WC	(Russia) D Medvedev	3	6	6
4	(Spain) P Carreño Busta	6	3	2

=== Bottom half ===
First round
7	(France) U Humbert	4	7^{7}	6
(Serbia) M Kecmanović	6	6^{3}	2
Q	(Spain) R Carballés Baena	7	4	6^{3}
(United States) S Querrey	5	6	7^{7}
(Italy) S Travaglia	7	7^{7}
(Argentina) G Pella	5	6^{4}
6	(Russia) K Khachanov	7^{9}	3	6
Q	(France) L Pouille	6^{7}	6	4
Q	(Spain) N Kuhn	1	6^{4}
(Spain) F López	6	7^{7}
(Germany) J-L Struff	6^{3}	3
(France) A Mannarino	7^{7}	6

Second round
7	(France) U Humbert
(United States) S Querrey	w/o
(Italy) S Travaglia	3	5
3/WC	(Spain) R Bautista Agut	6	7
6	(Russia) K Khachanov	6	2	4
(Spain) F López	4	6	6
(France) A Mannarino	2
2/WC	(Austria) D Thiem	5^{r}

Quarterfinals
(United States) S Querrey	6	7^{7}
3/WC	(Spain) R Bautista Agut	3	6^{4}
(Spain) F López	4	6	3
(France) A Mannarino	6	3	6

Semifinals
(United States) S Querrey	6	6
(France) A Mannarino	4	3

== Qualifying ==
=== Seeds ===
1. (Uruguay) Pablo Cuevas (first round)
2. (Moldova) Radu Albot (qualifying competition)
3. (France) Lucas Pouille (qualified)
4. (Spain) Roberto Carballés Baena (qualified)
5. (Spain) Pedro Martínez (first round)
6. (Portugal) João Sousa (qualifying competition)
7. (Colombia) Daniel Elahi Galán (first round)
8. (Uzbekistan) Denis Istomin (qualifying competition)

=== Qualifiers ===
1. (Slovakia) Lukáš Klein
2. (Spain) Nicola Kuhn
3. (France) Lucas Pouille
4. (Spain) Roberto Carballés Baena

=== Qualifying draw ===
==== First qualifier ====
First round
1	(Uruguay) Pablo Cuevas	3	4
(Slovakia) Lukáš Klein	6	6
(Spain) Roberto Ortega Olmedo	6	5	6^{5}
8	(Uzbekistan) Denis Istomin	4	7	7^{7}

Qualifying competition
(Slovakia) Lukáš Klein	6	2	6
8	(Uzbekistan) Denis Istomin	3	6	4

==== Second qualifier ====
First round
2	(Moldova) Radu Albot	6	4	7
(Germany) Matthias Bachinger	4	6	5
(Spain) Nicola Kuhn	6	6
5	(Spain) Pedro Martínez	2	2

Qualifying competition
2	(Moldova) Radu Albot	6^{5}	4
(Spain) Nicola Kuhn	7^{7}	6

==== Third qualifier ====
First round
3	(France) Lucas Pouille	5	6	6
WC	(Spain) Marc Othman Ktiri	7	2	2
(Italy) Matteo Viola	4	4
6	(Portugal) João Sousa	6	6

Qualifying competition
3	(France) Lucas Pouille	7^{11}	6
6	(Portugal) João Sousa	6^{9}	4

==== Fourth qualifier ====
First round
4	(Spain) Roberto Carballés Baena	6	6
WC	(Spain) Daniel Rincón	2	1
(Japan) Yosuke Watanuki	6	3	7
7	(Colombia) Daniel Elahi Galán	4	6	5

Qualifying competition
4	(Spain) Roberto Carballés Baena	6	5	6
(Japan) Yosuke Watanuki	4	7	2
