= 2016 Dubai Tennis Championships =

- Date: 15–20 February (women); 22–27 February (men)
- Edition: 24th (men) / 16th (women)
- Category: ATP World Tour 500 (men); WTA Premier (women)
- Draw: 32S / 16D (men); 28S / 16D (women)
- Prize money: $2,503,810 (ATP) $2,000,000 (WTA)
- Surface: Hard / outdoor
- Location: Dubai, United Arab Emirates
- Venue: Aviation Club Tennis Centre

Champions

Men's singles
- (Switzerland) Stan Wawrinka

Women's singles
- (Italy) Sara Errani

Men's doubles
- (Italy) Simone Bolelli / (Italy) Andreas Seppi

Women's doubles
- (Chinese Taipei) Chuang Chia-jung / (Croatia) Darija Jurak
- Dubai Tennis Championships

The 2016 Dubai Tennis Championships (also known as the 2016 Dubai Duty Free Tennis Championships for sponsorship reasons) was an ATP 500 event on the 2016 ATP World Tour and a WTA Premier on the 2016 WTA Tour. Both events were held at the Aviation Club Tennis Centre in Dubai, United Arab Emirates. The women's tournament took place from 15 to 20 February 2016, while the men's tournament took place from 22 to 27 February 2016.

== Finals ==
=== Men's singles ===
- (Switzerland) Stan Wawrinka defeated (Cyprus) Marcos Baghdatis 6–4, 7–6^{(15–13)}

=== Women's singles ===
- (Italy) Sara Errani defeated (Czech Republic) Barbora Strýcová 6–0, 6–2

=== Men's doubles ===
- (Italy) Simone Bolelli / (Italy) Andreas Seppi defeated (Spain) Feliciano López / (Spain) Marc López 6–2, 3–6, [14–12]

=== Women's doubles ===
- (Chinese Taipei) Chuang Chia-jung / (Croatia) Darija Jurak defeated (France) Caroline Garcia / (France) Kristina Mladenovic 6–4, 6–4

== Points and prize money ==
=== Point distribution ===
Event	W	F	SF	QF	Round of 16	Round of 32	Q	Q3	Q2	Q1
Men's singles	500	300	180	90	45	0	20	—N/a	10	0
Men's doubles	500	300	180	90	0	—N/a	45	—N/a	25	0
Women's singles	470	305	185	100	55	1	25	18	13	1
Women's doubles	470	305	185	100	1	—N/a	—N/a	—N/a	—N/a	—N/a

=== Prize money ===
Event	W	F	SF	QF	Round of 16	Round of 32	Q3	Q2	Q1
Men's singles	$511,750	$240,340	$119,340	$59,670	$30,235	$15,910	—N/a	$2,655	$1,460
Men's doubles	$150,800	$71,270	$34,390	$17,890	$9,370	—N/a	—N/a	—N/a	—N/a
Women's singles	$465,480	$254,124	$136,138	$35,723	$19,809	$10,950	$5,408	$2,951	$1,854
Women's doubles	$74,042	$39,184	$20,087	$10,042	$5,223	—N/a	—N/a	—N/a	—N/a
Doubles prize money per team

== ATP singles main-draw entrants ==
=== Seeds ===
Country	Player	Ranking^{1}	Seed
SRB	Novak Djokovic	1	1
SUI	Stan Wawrinka	4	2
CZE	Tomáš Berdych	8	3
ESP	Roberto Bautista Agut	18	4
SRB	Viktor Troicki	21	5
ESP	Feliciano López	25	6
SVK	Martin Kližan	27	7
GER	Philipp Kohlschreiber	29	8

- Rankings were as of February 15, 2016.

=== Other entrants ===
The following players received wildcards into the singles main draw:

- (India) Yuki Bhambri
- (Turkey) Marsel İlhan
- (Tunisia) Malek Jaziri

The following players received entry from the qualifying draw:

- (Italy) Thomas Fabbiano
- (France) Lucas Pouille
- (Croatia) Franko Škugor
- (Russia) Mikhail Youzhny

=== Withdrawals ===
Before the tournament

- (Switzerland) Roger Federer (knee injury) → replaced by (Italy) Simone Bolelli
- (Serbia) Janko Tipsarević → replaced by (Uzbekistan) Denis Istomin

=== Retirements ===
- (Serbia) Novak Djokovic (eye infection)
- (Australia) Nick Kyrgios (back pain)

== ATP doubles main-draw entrants ==
=== Seeds ===
Country	Player	Country	Player	Rank^{1}	Seed
NED	Jean-Julien Rojer	ROU	Horia Tecău	11	1
IND	Rohan Bopanna	ROU	Florin Mergea	20	2
CAN	Vasek Pospisil	SRB	Nenad Zimonjić	30	3
FIN	Henri Kontinen	AUS	John Peers	40	4

- Rankings were as of February 15, 2016.

=== Other entrants ===
The following pairs received wildcards into the doubles main draw:

- (India) Mahesh Bhupathi / (Pakistan) Aisam-ul-Haq Qureshi
- (Ukraine) Sergei Bubka / (Ukraine) Sergiy Stakhovsky

The following pair received entry from the qualifying draw:

- (South Korea) Hyeon Chung / (Czech Republic) Jiří Veselý

== WTA singles main-draw entrants ==
=== Seeds ===
Country	Player	Ranking^{1}	Seed
ROU	Simona Halep	3	1
ESP	Garbiñe Muguruza	5	2
ESP	Carla Suárez Navarro	8	3
CZE	Petra Kvitová	9	4
SUI	Belinda Bencic	11	5
CZE	Karolína Plíšková	13	6
ITA	Roberta Vinci	16	7
RUS	Svetlana Kuznetsova	17	8

- Rankings were as of February 8, 2016.

=== Other entrants ===
The following players received wildcards into the singles main draw:

- (Germany) Julia Görges
- (Romania) Simona Halep
- (Czech Republic) Petra Kvitová
- (Czech Republic) Karolína Plíšková

The following players received entry from the qualifying draw:

- (Slovakia) Jana Čepelová
- (Bulgaria) Tsvetana Pironkova
- (Kazakhstan) Yaroslava Shvedova
- (China) Zheng Saisai

=== Withdrawals ===
Before the tournament

- (Switzerland) Timea Bacsinszky (gastrointestinal illness) → replaced by (United States) CoCo Vandeweghe
- (Germany) Angelique Kerber (right upper thigh injury) → replaced by (Italy) Camila Giorgi
- (China) Peng Shuai (right hand injury) → replaced by (France) Caroline Garcia
- (Poland) Agnieszka Radwańska (left leg injury) → replaced by (Ukraine) Lesia Tsurenko
- (Czech Republic) Lucie Šafářová (ongoing illness and bacterial infection) → replaced by (United States) Madison Brengle
- (United States) Serena Williams (illness) → replaced by (Czech Republic) Barbora Strýcová
- (Denmark) Caroline Wozniacki (left knee injury) → replaced by (Australia) Daria Gavrilova

== WTA doubles main-draw entrants ==
=== Seeds ===
Country	Player	Country	Player	Rank^{1}	Seed
USA	Bethanie Mattek-Sands	KAZ	Yaroslava Shvedova	10	1
FRA	Caroline Garcia	FRA	Kristina Mladenovic	20	2
CZE	Andrea Hlaváčková	CZE	Lucie Hradecká	22	3
HUN	Tímea Babos	GER	Julia Görges	36	4

- Rankings were as of February 8, 2016.

=== Other entrants ===
The following pairs received wildcards into the doubles main draw:

- (Oman) Fatma Al-Nabhani / (Bulgaria) Tsvetana Pironkova
- (Czech Republic) Petra Kvitová / (Poland) Alicja Rosolska
