= 2014 Trofeo Faip–Perrel =

Tennis tournament

- Date: 10–16 February
- Edition: 9th
- Draw: 32S / 16D
- Prize money: €42,500+H
- Surface: Hard
- Location: Bergamo, Italy

Champions

Singles
- (Italy) Simone Bolelli

Doubles
- (Slovakia) Karol Beck / (Slovakia) Michal Mertiňák
← 2013 ·	Trofeo Faip–Perrel	· 2015 →

The 2014 Trofeo Faip–Perrel was a professional tennis tournament played on hard courts. It was the ninth edition of the tournament which was part of the 2014 ATP Challenger Tour. It took place in Bergamo, Italy between 10 and 16 February 2014.

== Singles main-draw entrants ==
=== Seeds ===
Country	Player	Rank^{1}	Seed
GER	Dustin Brown	104	1
GER	Jan-Lennard Struff	119	2
BIH	Damir Džumhur	145	3
LTU	Ričardas Berankis	151	4
ITA	Marco Cecchinato	167	5
GER	Matthias Bachinger	169	6
ITA	Matteo Viola	172	7
RUS	Konstantin Kravchuk	178	8

- ^{1} Rankings are as of February 3, 2014.

=== Other entrants ===
The following players received wildcards into the singles main draw:

- (Italy) Simone Bolelli
- (Italy) Matteo Donati
- (Italy) Andrea Falgheri
- (Italy) Gianluigi Quinzi

The following players received entry from the qualifying draw:

- (United Kingdom) Edward Corrie
- (Italy) Matteo Trevisan
- (Italy) Federico Gaio
- (Slovakia) Karol Beck

== Champions ==
=== Singles ===
- (Italy) Simone Bolelli def. (Germany) Jan-Lennard Struff, 7–6^{(8–6)}, 6–4

=== Doubles ===
- (Slovakia) Karol Beck / (Slovakia) Michal Mertiňák def. (Russia) Konstantin Kravchuk / (Ukraine) Denys Molchanov, 4–6, 7–5, [10–6]
