= 2015 Trofeo Faip–Perrel =

Tennis tournament

- Date: 9–15 February
- Edition: 10th
- Draw: 32S / 16D
- Prize money: €42,500+H
- Surface: Hard
- Location: Bergamo, Italy

Champions

Singles
- (France) Benoît Paire

Doubles
- (Germany) Martin Emmrich / (Sweden) Andreas Siljeström
← 2014 ·	Trofeo Faip–Perrel	· 2016 →

The 2015 Trofeo Faip–Perrel was a professional tennis tournament played on hard courts. It was the tenth edition of the tournament which was part of the 2015 ATP Challenger Tour. It took place in Bergamo, Italy between 9 and 15 February 2015.

== Singles main-draw entrants ==
=== Seeds ===
Country	Player	Rank^{1}	Seed
GER	Andreas Beck	110	1
FRA	Lucas Pouille	115	2
UZB	Farrukh Dustov	118	3
KAZ	Aleksandr Nedovyesov	123	4
UKR	Illya Marchenko	134	5
FRA	Benoît Paire	149	6
CRO	Mate Delić	152	7
HUN	Márton Fucsovics	160	8

- ^{1} Rankings are as of February 2, 2015.

=== Other entrants ===
The following players received wildcards into the singles main draw:

- (France) Enzo Couacaud
- (Italy) Andrea Falgheri
- (Italy) Federico Gaio
- (Italy) Roberto Marcora

The following players received entry from the qualifying draw:

- (Bosnia and Herzegovina) Mirza Bašić
- (Germany) Daniel Brands
- (Austria) Martin Fischer
- (France) Maxime Teixeira

The following players received entry into the main draw as an alternate:

- (France) Benoît Paire
- (France) Axel Michon

The following player gained entry into the main draw via protected ranking:

- (Germany) Philipp Petzschner

== Champions ==
=== Singles ===
- (France) Benoît Paire def. (Kazakhstan) Aleksandr Nedovyesov, 6–3, 7–6^{(7–3)}

=== Doubles ===
- (Germany) Martin Emmrich / (Sweden) Andreas Siljeström def. (Poland) Błażej Koniusz / (Poland) Mateusz Kowalczyk, 6–4, 7–5
