= Simone Bolelli =

Italian tennis player

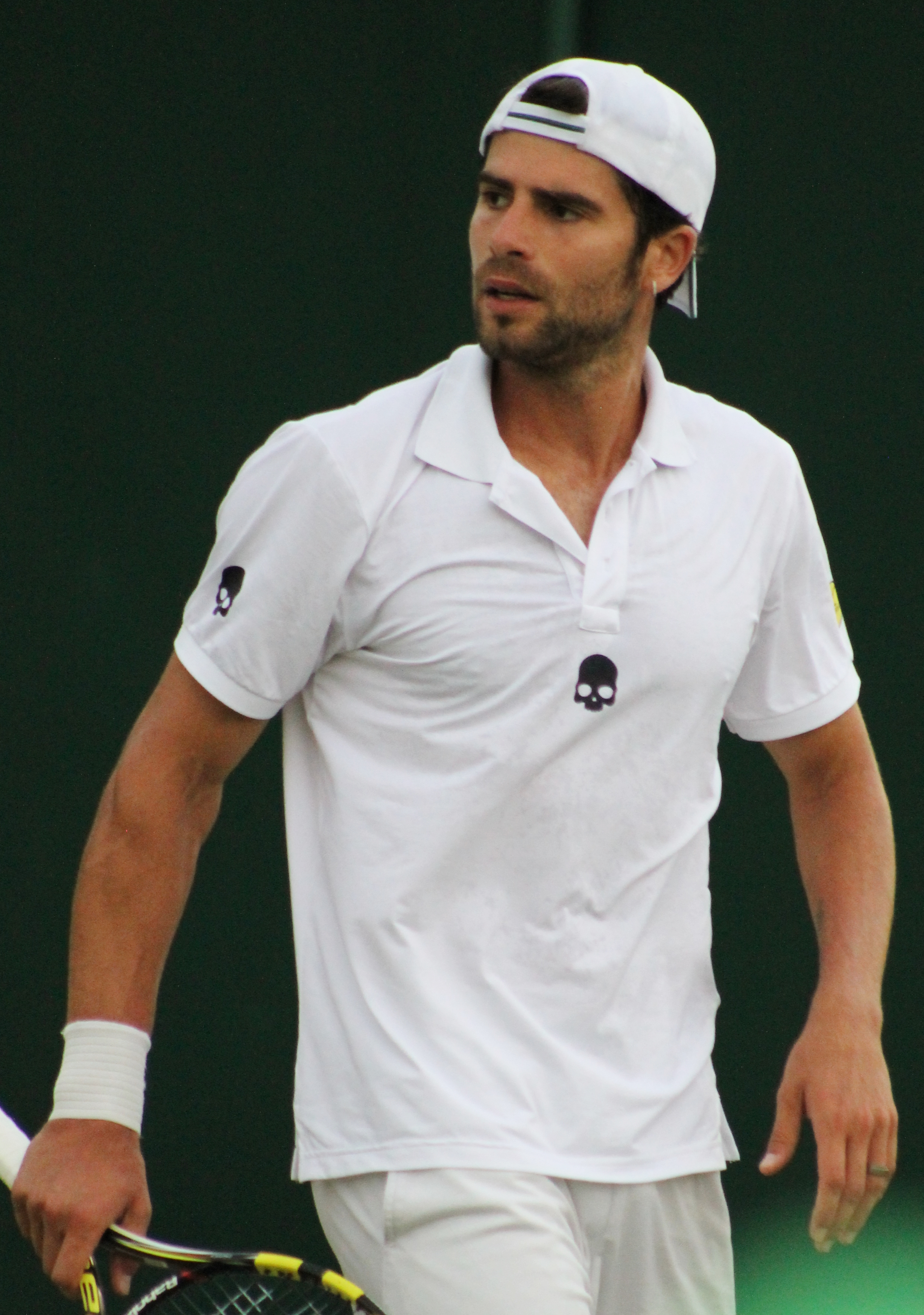
- Bolelli at the 2014 Wimbledon Championships
- Country (sports): Italy
- Residence: Monte Carlo, Monaco
- Born: 8 October 1985 (age 40) Bologna, Italy
- Height: 1.83 m (6 ft 0 in)
- Turned pro: 2003
- Plays: Right-handed (one-handed backhand)
- Prize money: $ 7,662,049

Singles
- Career record: 123–165
- Career titles: 0
- Highest ranking: No. 36 (23 February 2009)

Grand Slam singles results
- Australian Open: 2R (2008, 2009, 2015, 2016)
- French Open: 3R (2008, 2015)
- Wimbledon: 3R (2008, 2011, 2014)
- US Open: 2R (2007, 2014)

Other tournaments
- Olympic Games: 1R (2008)

Doubles
- Career record: 349–250
- Career titles: 21
- Highest ranking: No. 6 (13 January 2025)
- Current ranking: No. 16 (16 March 2026)

Grand Slam doubles results
- Australian Open: W (2015)
- French Open: F (2024)
- Wimbledon: SF (2021)
- US Open: SF (2011)

Other doubles tournaments
- Tour Finals: SF (2025)
- Olympic Games: 1R (2008, 2024)

Team competitions
- Davis Cup: W (2023, 2024, 2025); Record: 24–22
Medal record
Mediterranean Games
Bronze medal – third place	2005 Almería	Singles
- Last updated on: 16 March 2026.

Simone Bolelli (Italian pronunciation: [siˈmoːne boˈlɛlli]; born 8 October 1985) is an Italian professional tennis player who specializes in doubles. He has a career-high ATP ranking in doubles of World No. 6 achieved on 13 January 2025 and in singles of No. 36 achieved on 23 February 2009. Bolelli is a Grand Slam champion, having won the 2015 Australian Open doubles event with Fabio Fognini, together becoming the first male all-Italian pair to win a Major in the Open Era. He also reached three other major finals with Andrea Vavassori at the 2024 and the 2025 Australian Open, and at the 2024 French Open. He has won 20 ATP Tour titles, the most doubles titles of any Italian man in the Open Era. He is also the Italian player who has won the highest number of Davis Cups for his national team, marking a record of three times in a row: in 2023, 2024 and 2025. He was a bronze medalist at the 2005 Mediterranean Games.

== Career ==
=== 2003–2005: Pro beginnings, first ITF singles titles ===
In 2003, Bolelli reached his first ITF Futures tournament semifinal at Egypt F1, losing to 485th-ranked Jaroslav Pospíšil. He played entirely Futures events except for one Challenger tournament in Brindisi.

In 2004, Bolelli reached his second Futures final, losing to Dominique Coene. He made another final and won two Futures titles, making two wins out of three finals for Futures finals in the 2004 season. He won the Italy F15 and F8 titles, and lost in the final of a Challenger event in Brașov.

In 2005, Bolelli reached the final of a Challenger in Trani.

=== 2006: ATP debut, First Challenger singles title ===
Simone Bolelli played in a few tournaments higher than a Challenger, reaching the quarterfinals in doubles on his Masters 1000 debut partnering with Andreas Seppi as alternates pair at the 2006 Monte Carlo Masters and also receiving a wildcard into the singles and doubles (w/ Seppi) main draws at the 2006 Rome Masters.

He also won the Como Futures tournament and made the final of Recanati, before losing to Davide Sanguinetti. He won his first Challenger singles title over Ivo Minář, and then made the final of a Challenger in Bergamo where he lost to Alex Bogdanović.

=== 2007: Grand Slam debut in singles ===
Bolelli beat former world no. 1 Marat Safin in Barcelona and competed in the Miami, Rome and Hamburg Masters.

He made his Grand Slam debut at the 2007 French Open.

=== 2008: First singles final ===
In May, Bolleli reached his maiden final at the clay-court 2008 BMW Open tournament in Munich, where he was defeated by Fernando González.

In September, Simone Bolelli was banned by The Italian Tennis Federation from national team events for skipping the Davis Cup tie with Latvia in Europe-Africa zone relegation playoff. The ban prevented Bolelli from playing in Davis Cup competition and the Olympics. It also prevented him from getting wildcards. Bolelli said that he had told Italy captain Corrado Barazzutti well in advance of the tie that he preferred to work on his fast-court game in Asia.

=== 2015: Grand Slam title, three Masters finals with Fognini, World No. 8 ===
At the 2015 Australian Open, Bolelli and Fabio Fognini captured their first Grand Slam championship doubles title. The Italian duo, playing their ninth major together, defeated French pair Pierre-Hugues Herbert and Nicolas Mahut in straight sets 6–4, 6–4 in the final.

They also reached the semifinals of the 2015 French Open and three Masters finals at the 2015 Indian Wells Masters, 2015 Monte-Carlo Masters and 2015 Shanghai Rolex Masters.

=== 2016: First ATP 500 title with Seppi ===
In February 2016, Bolleli won his second biggest title in doubles at the ATP 500 2016 Dubai Tennis Championships with Andreas Seppi.

=== 2021: Wimbledon semifinal and three titles with Gonzalez ===
In 2021 Bolleli won two clay titles with new partner Máximo González at the 2021 Chile Open and 2021 Emilia-Romagna Open in Parma and one grass title at the first edition of the 2021 Mallorca Championships after the walkover from the wildcard pair Novak Djokovic/Carlos Gómez-Herrera and reached two other finals. He returned to the top 50 in doubles at World No. 46 on 28 June 2021.

Having never passed the second round and not played for five years at the 2021 Wimbledon Championships, Bolleli most successful run with his partner was to the semifinals of the Major where the unseeded pair was defeated by fourth seeded pair and eventual runners-up Marcel Granollers and Horacio Zeballos. As a result, he raised back up to No. 32 in the doubles rankings on 12 July 2021. He returned to the top 30 in the doubles rankings on 26 July 2021.

=== 2022–23: Reunion with Fognini, Major quarterfinal, Second ATP 500 title ===
At the 2022 Australian Open he reached the quarterfinals with Fabio Fognini where they lost to second seeded pair Rajeev Ram and Joe Salisbury. He won his second ATP 500 doubles title with Fognini at the 2022 Rio Open.

They won the 2023 Argentina Open in Buenos Aires for a second time at this tournament, the two titles won 10 years apart.

=== 2024: Second Davis Cup win, Australian, French Open finals ===
Partnering with new partner, compatriot Andrea Vavassori he reached the 2024 Australian Open final for a second time in his career. They overcame unseeded pair of Yannick Hanfmann and Dominik Koepfer in three sets. They lost to second seeded pair Rohan Bopanna and Matthew Ebden in straight sets.

At the 2024 French Open, he reached his second Major final in doubles with Vavassori and third overall, defeating third seeds Rajeev Ram and Joe Salisbury, and then second seeds Rohan Bopanna and Matthew Ebden.

Bolelli and Vavassori won the China Open in October, defeating third seeds Harri Heliövaara and Henry Patten in the final. The duo Bolelli and Vavassori won the 2024 ATP Fans’ Favourite doubles team award.

=== 2025: Third Australian Open final & Davis Cup title, World No. 6 ===
Vavassori and Bolelli won the Adelaide International, defeating Kevin Krawietz and Tim Pütz in the final. It was Bolelli’s 15th ATP Tour title. As a result he moved to a new career-high of World No. 6 on 13 January 2025. The pair reached the final at the Australian Open, losing to sixth seeds Harri Heliövaara and Henry Patten.

=== 2026: First ATP Masters title, Open Era record ===
In March, he and Vavassori won their maiden ATP 1000 title at the Miami Open, defeating Harri Heliövaara and Henry Patten in the final. With the victory, Bolelli became the first Italian man to win 20 tour-level doubles titles in the Open Era.

== Grand Slam finals ==
=== Doubles: 4 (1 title, 3 runner-ups) ===
Result	Year	Championship	Surface	Partner	Opponents	Score
Win	2015	Australian Open	Hard	(Italy) Fabio Fognini	(France) Pierre-Hugues Herbert (France) Nicolas Mahut	6–4, 6–4
Loss	2024	Australian Open	Hard	(Italy) Andrea Vavassori	(India) Rohan Bopanna (Australia) Matthew Ebden	6–7^{(0–7)}, 5–7
Loss	2024	French Open	Clay	(Italy) Andrea Vavassori	(El Salvador) Marcelo Arévalo (Croatia) Mate Pavić	5–7, 3–6
Loss	2025	Australian Open	Hard	(Italy) Andrea Vavassori	(Finland) Harri Heliövaara (United Kingdom) Henry Patten	7–6^{(18–16)}, 6–7^{(5–7)}, 3–6

== Masters 1000 finals ==
=== Doubles: 5 (2 titles, 3 runners-up) ===
Result	Year	Tournament	Surface	Partner	Opponents	Score
Loss	2015	Indian Wells Masters	Hard	(Italy) Fabio Fognini	(United States) Jack Sock (Canada) Vasek Pospisil	6–4, 6-7^{(3–7)}, [10–7]
Loss	2015	Monte-Carlo Masters	Clay	(Italy) Fabio Fognini	(United States) Bob Bryan (United States) Mike Bryan	6–7^{(3–7)}, 1–6
Loss	2015	Shanghai Masters	Hard	(Italy) Fabio Fognini	(South Africa) Raven Klaasen (Brazil) Marcelo Melo	3–6, 3–6
Win	2026	Miami Open	Hard	(Italy) Andrea Vavassori	(Finland) Harri Heliövaara (United Kingdom) Henry Patten	6–4, 6–2
Win	2026	Italian Open	Clay	(Italy) Andrea Vavassori	(Spain) Marcel Granollers (Argentina) Horacio Zeballos	7–6^{(10–8)}, 6–7^{(3–7)}, [10–3]

== ATP career finals ==
=== Singles: 1 (1 runner-up) ===
Legend Grand Slam tournaments (0–0) ATP World Tour Finals (0–0) ATP World Tour Masters 1000 (0–0) ATP World Tour 500 Series (0–0) ATP World Tour 250 Series (0–1)	Finals by surface Hard (0–0) Clay (0–1) Grass (0–0)	Finals by setting Outdoor (0–1) Indoor (0–0)

Result	W–L	Date	Tournament	Tier	Surface	Opponent	Score
Loss	0–1	May 2008	Bavarian Championships, Germany	International	Clay	(Chile) Fernando González	6–7^{(4–7)}, 7–6^{(7–4)}, 3–6

=== Doubles: 39 (21 titles, 18 runner-ups) ===
Legend Grand Slam tournaments (1–3) ATP World Tour Finals (0–0) ATP World Tour Masters 1000 (2–3) ATP World Tour 500 Series (8–3) ATP World Tour 250 Series (10–9)	Finals by surface Hard (8–8) Clay (11–8) Grass (2–2)	Finals by setting Outdoor (19–15) Indoor (2–3)

Result	W–L	Date	Tournament	Tier	Surface	Partner	Opponents	Score
Win	1–0	May 2011	Bavarian Championships, Germany	250 Series	Clay	(Argentina) Horacio Zeballos	(Germany) Andreas Beck (Germany) Christopher Kas	7–6^{(7–3)}, 6–4
Win	2–0	Jul 2011	Croatia Open, Croatia	250 Series	Clay	(Italy) Fabio Fognini	(Croatia) Marin Čilić (Croatia) Lovro Zovko	6–3, 5–7, [10–7]
Loss	2–1	Oct 2012	Kremlin Cup, Russia	250 Series	Hard (i)	(Italy) Daniele Bracciali	(Czech Republic) František Čermák (Slovakia) Michal Mertiňák	5–7, 3–6
Win	3–1	Feb 2013	Argentina Open, Argentina	250 Series	Clay	(Italy) Fabio Fognini	(United States) Nicholas Monroe (Germany) Simon Stadler	6–3, 6–2
Loss	3–2	Feb 2013	Mexican Open, Mexico	500 Series	Clay	(Italy) Fabio Fognini	(Poland) Łukasz Kubot (Spain) David Marrero	5–7, 2–6
Win	4–2	Jan 2015	Australian Open, Australia	Grand Slam	Hard	(Italy) Fabio Fognini	(France) Pierre-Hugues Herbert (France) Nicolas Mahut	6–4, 6–4
Loss	4–3	Mar 2015	Indian Wells Masters, United States	Masters 1000	Hard	(Italy) Fabio Fognini	(Canada) Vasek Pospisil (United States) Jack Sock	4–6, 7–6^{(7–3)}, [7–10]
Loss	4–4	Apr 2015	Monte-Carlo Masters, Monaco	Masters 1000	Clay	(Italy) Fabio Fognini	(United States) Bob Bryan (United States) Mike Bryan	6–7^{(3–7)}, 1–6
Loss	4–5	Oct 2015	Shanghai Masters, China	Masters 1000	Hard	(Italy) Fabio Fognini	(South Africa) Raven Klaasen (Brazil) Marcelo Melo	3–6, 3–6
Win	5–5	Feb 2016	Dubai Tennis Championships, UAE	500 Series	Hard	(Italy) Andreas Seppi	(Spain) Feliciano López (Spain) Marc López	6–2, 3–6, [14–12]
Loss	5–6	Jul 2018	Swedish Open, Sweden	250 Series	Clay	(Italy) Fabio Fognini	(Chile) Julio Peralta (Argentina) Horacio Zeballos	3–6, 4–6
Loss	5–7	Sep 2019	St. Petersburg Open, Russia	250 Series	Hard (i)	(Italy) Matteo Berrettini	(India) Divij Sharan (Slovakia) Igor Zelenay	3–6, 6–3, [8–10]
Loss	5–8	Oct 2019	Kremlin Cup, Russia	250 Series	Hard (i)	(Argentina) Andrés Molteni	(Brazil) Marcelo Demoliner (Netherlands) Matwé Middelkoop	1–6, 2–6
Win	6–8	Mar 2021	Chile Open, Chile	250 Series	Clay	(Argentina) Máximo González	(Argentina) Federico Delbonis (Spain) Jaume Munar	7–6^{(7–4)}, 6–4
Loss	6–9	Apr 2021	Sardegna Open, Italy	250 Series	Clay	(Argentina) Andrés Molteni	(Italy) Lorenzo Sonego (Italy) Andrea Vavassori	3–6, 4–6
Loss	6–10	May 2021	Geneva Open, Switzerland	250 Series	Clay	(Argentina) Máximo González	(Australia) John Peers (New Zealand) Michael Venus	2–6, 5–7
Win	7–10	May 2021	Emilia-Romagna Open, Italy	250 Series	Clay	(Argentina) Máximo González	(Austria) Oliver Marach (Pakistan) Aisam-ul-Haq Qureshi	6–3, 6–3
Win	8–10	Jun 2021	Mallorca Open, Spain	250 Series	Grass	(Argentina) Máximo González	(Serbia) Novak Djokovic (Spain) Carlos Gómez-Herrera	Walkover
Loss	8–11	Jan 2022	Sydney International, Australia	250 Series	Hard	(Italy) Fabio Fognini	(Australia) John Peers (Slovakia) Filip Polášek	5-7, 5-7
Win	9–11	Feb 2022	Rio Open, Brazil	500 Series	Clay	(Italy) Fabio Fognini	(United Kingdom) Jamie Murray (Brazil) Bruno Soares	7–5, 6–7^{(2–7)}, [10–6]
Loss	9–12	Jul 2022	Swedish Open, Sweden	250 Series	Clay	(Italy) Fabio Fognini	(Brazil) Rafael Matos (Spain) David Vega Hernández	4–6, 6–3, [11–13]
Win	10–12	Jul 2022	Croatia Open (2), Croatia	250 Series	Clay	(Italy) Fabio Fognini	(United Kingdom) Lloyd Glasspool (Finland) Harri Heliövaara	5–7, 7–6^{(8–6)}, [10–7]
Win	11–12	Feb 2023	Argentina Open (2), Argentina	250 Series	Clay	(Italy) Fabio Fognini	(Colombia) Nicolás Barrientos (Uruguay) Ariel Behar	6–2, 6–4
Loss	11–13	Jun 2023	Halle Open, Germany	500 Series	Grass	(Italy) Andrea Vavassori	(Brazil) Marcelo Melo (Australia) John Peers	6–7^{(3–7)}, 6–3, [6–10]
Loss	11–14	Jul 2023	Croatia Open, Croatia	250 Series	Clay	(Italy) Andrea Vavassori	(Slovenia) Blaž Rola (Croatia) Nino Serdarušić	6–4, 6–7^{(2–7)}, [13–15]
Loss	11–15	Jan 2024	Australian Open, Australia	Grand Slam	Hard	(Italy) Andrea Vavassori	(India) Rohan Bopanna (Australia) Matthew Ebden	6–7^{(0–7)}, 5–7
Win	12–15	Feb 2024	Argentina Open (3), Argentina	250 Series	Clay	(Italy) Andrea Vavassori	(Spain) Marcel Granollers (Argentina) Horacio Zeballos	6–2, 7–6^{(8–6)}
Loss	12–16	Jun 2024	French Open, France	Grand Slam	Clay	(Italy) Andrea Vavassori	(El Salvador) Marcelo Arévalo (Croatia) Mate Pavić	5–7, 3–6
Win	13–16	Jun 2024	Halle Open, Germany	500 Series	Grass	(Italy) Andrea Vavassori	(Germany) Kevin Krawietz (Germany) Tim Pütz	7–6^{(7–3)}, 7–6^{(7–5)}
Win	14–16	Oct 2024	China Open, China	500 Series	Hard	(Italy) Andrea Vavassori	(Finland) Harri Heliövaara (United Kingdom) Henry Patten	4–6, 6–3, [10–5]
Win	15–16	Jan 2025	Adelaide International, Australia	250 Series	Hard	(Italy) Andrea Vavassori	(Germany) Kevin Krawietz (Germany) Tim Pütz	4–6, 7–6^{(7–4)}, [11–9]
Loss	15–17	Jan 2025	Australian Open, Australia	Grand Slam	Hard	(Italy) Andrea Vavassori	(Finland) Harri Heliövaara (United Kingdom) Henry Patten	7–6^{(18–16)}, 6–7^{(5–7)}, 3–6
Win	16–17	Feb 2025	Rotterdam Open, Netherlands	500 Series	Hard (i)	(Italy) Andrea Vavassori	(Belgium) Sander Gillé (Poland) Jan Zieliński	6–2, 4–6, [10–6]
Win	17–17	May 2025	Hamburg Open, Germany	500 Series	Clay	(Italy) Andrea Vavassori	(Argentina) Andrés Molteni (Brazil) Fernando Romboli	6–4, 6–0
Loss	17–18	Jun 2025	Halle Open, Germany	500 Series	Grass	(Italy) Andrea Vavassori	(Germany) Kevin Krawietz (Germany) Tim Pütz	3–6, 6–7^{(4–7)}
Win	18–18	Jul 2025	Washington Open, United States	500 Series	Hard	(Italy) Andrea Vavassori	(Monaco) Hugo Nys (France) Édouard Roger-Vasselin	6–3, 6–4
Win	19–18	Feb 2026	Rotterdam Open, Netherlands	500 Series	Hard (i)	(Italy) Andrea Vavassori	(Chinese Taipei) Ray Ho (Germany) Hendrik Jebens	6–3, 6–4
Win	20–18	Mar 2026	Miami Open, United States	Masters 1000	Hard	(Italy) Andrea Vavassori	(Finland) Harri Heliövaara (United Kingdom) Henry Patten	6–4, 6–2
Win	21–18	May 2026	Italian Open, Italy	Masters 1000	Clay	(Italy) Andrea Vavassori	(Spain) Marcel Granollers (Argentina) Horacio Zeballos	7–6^{(10–8)}, 6–7^{(3–7)}, [10–3]

== Challenger and Futures finals ==
=== Singles: 24 (14–10) ===
Legend (singles) ATP Challenger Tour (12–9) ITF Futures Tour (2–1)	Titles by surface Hard (10–8) Clay (4–1) Grass (0–1) Carpet (0–0)

Result	W–L	Date	Tournament	Tier	Surface	Opponent	Score
Win	1–0	May 2004	Italy F8, Verona	Futures	Clay	(Italy) Alex Vittur	6–1, 7–6^{(7–4)}
Win	2–0	Jul 2004	Italy F15, Bologna	Futures	Clay	(Italy) Mattia Livraghi	6–2, 6–3
Loss	2–1	Sep 2004	Brașov, Romania	Challenger	Clay	(Romania) Victor Ioniță	1–6, 6–7^{(3–7)}
Loss	2–2	Oct 2004	Belgium F1, Waterloo	Futures	Carpet (i)	(Belgium) Dominique Coene	2–6, 3–6
Loss	2–3	Aug 2005	Trani, Italy	Challenger	Clay	(Czech Republic) Lukáš Dlouhý	4–6, 4–6
Loss	2–4	Feb 2006	Bergamo, Italy	Challenger	Hard (i)	(United Kingdom) Alex Bogdanovic	1–6, 0–3 ret.
Win	3–4	Jul 2006	Biella, Italy	Challenger	Clay	(Czech Republic) Ivo Minář	7–5, 3–6, 7–6^{(7–0)}
Loss	3–5	Jul 2006	Recanati, Italy	Challenger	Hard	(Italy) Davide Sanguinetti	4–6, 0–3 ret.
Win	4–5	Sep 2006	Como, Italy	Challenger	Clay	(Italy) Federico Luzzi	4–6, 6–3, 6–2
Loss	4–6	Feb 2007	Bergamo, Italy	Challenger	Hard (i)	(France) Fabrice Santoro	2–6, 1–6
Loss	4–7	Apr 2007	Casablanca, Morocco	Challenger	Clay	(Croatia) Marin Čilić	6–4, 3–6, 4–6
Win	5–7	May 2007	Tunis, Tunisia	Challenger	Clay	(Romania) Andrei Pavel	4–6, 7–6^{(7–4)}, 6–2
Win	6–7	Nov 2007	Bratislava, Slovakia	Challenger	Hard (i)	(Colombia) Alejandro Falla	4–6, 7–6^{(9–7)}, 6–1
Loss	6–8	May 2010	Biella, Italy	Challenger	Clay	(Germany) Björn Phau	4–6, 2–6
Win	7–8	Jul 2010	Turin, Italy	Challenger	Clay	(Italy) Potito Starace	7–6^{(9–7)}, 6–2
Win	8–8	May 2011	Rome, Italy	Challenger	Clay	(Argentina) Eduardo Schwank	2–6, 6–1, 6–3
Win	9–8	Mar 2012	Florianópolis, Brazil	Challenger	Clay	(Slovenia) Blaž Kavčič	6–3, 6–4
Win	10–8	Jul 2012	Recanati, Italy	Challenger	Hard	(France) Fabrice Martin	6–3, 6–2
Loss	10–9	Aug 2012	San Marino, San Marino	Challenger	Clay	(Slovakia) Martin Kližan	3–6, 1–6
Win	11–9	Feb 2014	Bergamo, Italy	Challenger	Hard (i)	(Germany) Jan-Lennard Struff	7–6^{(8–6)}, 6–4
Win	12–9	Apr 2014	Vercelli, Italy	Challenger	Clay	(Croatia) Mate Delić	6–2, 6–2
Win	13–9	May 2014	Tunis, Tunisia	Challenger	Clay	(Germany) Julian Reister	6–4, 6–2
Win	14–9	Jul 2014	Oberstaufen, Germany	Challenger	Clay	(Germany) Michael Berrer	6–4, 7–6^{(7–2)}
Loss	14–10	Mar 2018	Punta del Este, Uruguay	Challenger	Clay	(Argentina) Guido Andreozzi	6–3, 4–6, 3–6
Loss	14–11	Apr 2018	Barletta, Italy	Challenger	Clay	(Argentina) Marco Trungelliti	6–2, 6–7^{(4–7)}, 4–6

=== Doubles: 13 (7–6) ===
Legend (doubles) ATP Challenger Tour (4–6) ITF Futures Tour (3–0)	Titles by surface Hard (3–1) Clay (4–5) Grass (0–0) Carpet (0–0)

Result	W–L	Date	Tournament	Tier	Surface	Partner	Opponents	Score
Win	1–0	Sep 2002	Italy F5, Selargius	Futures	Hard	(Italy) Filippo Figliomeni	(Italy) Florian Allgauer (Italy) Stefano Mocci	w/o
Win	2–0	May 2004	Italy F8, Verona	Futures	Clay	(Italy) Alberto Brizzi	(Italy) Diego Álvarez (Chile) Juan Felipe Yáñez	6–3, 6–2
Win	3–0	Jul 2004	Italy F15, Bologna	Futures	Clay	(Italy) Alberto Brizzi	(Bosnia and Herzegovina) Ivan Dodig (Australia) Michael Staniak	7–6^{(7–4)}, 6–0
Loss	3–1	Apr 2006	Napoli, Italy	Challenger	Clay	(Italy) Fabio Fognini	(Czech Republic) Tomáš Cibulec (Poland) Łukasz Kubot	5–7, 6–4, [7–10]
Win	4–1	Jul 2006	Recanati, Italy	Challenger	Hard	(Italy) Davide Sanguinetti	(Germany) Sebastian Rieschick (Serbia and Montenegro) Viktor Troicki	6–1, 3–6, [10–4]
Loss	4–2	Sep 2007	Genoa, Italy	Challenger	Clay	(Italy) Flavio Cipolla	(Italy) Daniele Giorgini (Italy) Simone Vagnozzi	3–6, 1–6
Win	5–2	Feb 2008	Bergamo, Italy	Challenger	Hard (i)	(Italy) Andreas Seppi	(United States) James Cerretani (Slovakia) Igor Zelenay	6–3, 6–0
Loss	5–3	Mar 2018	Punta del Este, Uruguay	Challenger	Clay	(Italy) Alessandro Giannessi	(Argentina) Facundo Bagnis (Uruguay) Ariel Behar	2–6, 6–7^{(7–9)}
Loss	5–4	Aug 2018	Pullach, Germany	Challenger	Clay	(Italy) Daniele Bracciali	(Belgium) Sander Gillé (Belgium) Joran Vliegen	2–6, 2–6
Loss	5–5	Jun 2019	Lyon, France	Challenger	Clay	(Italy) Andrea Pellegrino	(Austria) Philipp Oswald (Slovakia) Filip Polášek	4–6, 6–7^{(2–7)}
Win	6–5	Jul 2019	Braunschweig, Germany	Challenger	Clay	(Argentina) Guillermo Durán	(Croatia) Antonio Šančić (United States) Nathaniel Lammons	6–3, 6–2
Win	7–5	Oct 2019	Barcelona, Spain	Challenger	Clay	(Spain) David Vega Hernández	(Spain) Sergio Martos Gornés (India) Ramkumar Ramanathan	6–4, 7–5
Loss	7–6	Mar 2020	Pau, France	Challenger	Hard (i)	(Romania) Florin Mergea	(France) Benjamin Bonzi (France) Antoine Hoang	3–6, 2–6

== Performance timelines ==
Key
W	F	SF	QF	#R	RR	Q#	P#	DNQ	A	Z#	PO	G	S	B	NMS	NTI	P	NH

(W) winner; (F) finalist; (SF) semifinalist; (QF) quarterfinalist; (#R) rounds 4, 3, 2, 1; (RR) round-robin stage; (Q#) qualification round; (P#) preliminary round; (DNQ) did not qualify; (A) absent; (Z#) Davis/Fed Cup Zonal Group (with number indication) or (PO) play-off; (G) gold, (S) silver or (B) bronze Olympic/Paralympic medal; (NMS) not a Masters tournament; (NTI) not a Tier I tournament; (P) postponed; (NH) not held; (SR) strike rate (events won / competed); (W–L) win–loss record.
To avoid confusion and double counting, these charts are updated at the conclusion of a tournament or when the player's participation has ended.

=== Singles ===
Tournament	2005	2006	2007	2008	2009	2010	2011	2012	2013	2014	2015	2016	2017	2018	2019	SR	W–L
Grand Slam tournaments
Australian Open	A	Q2	Q2	2R	2R	1R	Q2	Q3	1R	A	2R	2R	A	A	Q1	0 / 6	4–6
French Open	A	Q2	2R	3R	2R	1R	2R	1R	1R	2R	3R	1R	2R	1R	1R	0 / 13	9–13
Wimbledon	A	Q3	2R	3R	2R^{[a]}	A	3R	1R	1R	3R	1R	A	2R	2R	Q1	0 / 10	10–9
US Open	Q2	Q1	2R	1R	1R	Q1	A	A	A	2R	1R	A	Q3	Q2	A	0 / 5	2–5
Win–loss	0–0	0–0	3–3	5–4	3–3	0–2	3–2	0–2	0–3	4–3	3–4	1–2	2–2	1–2	0–1	0 / 34	25–33
National representation
Summer Olympics	Not Held			1R	Not Held			A	Not Held			A	Not Held			0 / 1	0–1
Davis Cup	A	A	Z1	Z1	PO	PO	PO	PO	QF	SF	1R	QF	QF	QF	QR	0 / 6	7–9
Win–loss	0–0	0–0	1–1	1–2	0–1	2–1	1–1	2–1	0–0	0–1	0–2	0–0	0–0	0–0	0–0	0 / 7	7–10
ATP World Tour Masters 1000
Indian Wells Masters	A	Q2	Q1	1R	1R	A	A	A	A	A	2R	A	A	A	A	0 / 3	1–3
Miami Open	A	A	3R	3R	1R	A	Q2	1R	2R	A	2R	1R	A	A	A	0 / 7	6–7
Monte-Carlo Masters	A	Q2	A	2R	3R	1R	Q2	1R	A	1R	1R	A	Q2	A	A	0 / 6	3–6
Madrid Open	A	A	Q2	2R	2R	A	A	A	A	A	3R	A	A	A	A	0 / 3	4–3
Italian Open	A	1R	1R	3R	1R	2R	1R	Q1	A	2R	1R	A	A	A	A	0 / 8	4–8
Canadian Open	A	A	A	1R	A	A	A	A	A	A	A	A	A	A	A	0 / 1	0–1
Cincinnati Masters	A	A	A	2R	1R	A	A	A	A	A	A	A	A	A	A	0 / 2	1–2
Shanghai Masters	NMS				A	A	Q2	A	A	A	1R	A	A	A	A	0 / 1	0–1
Paris Masters	A	A	Q1	2R	Q1	A	A	A	A	A	A	A	A	A	A	0 / 1	1–1
German Open	A	A	1R	2R	Not Masters Series											0 / 2	1–2
Win–loss	0–0	0–1	2–3	9–9	3–6	1–2	0–1	0–2	1–1	1–2	4–6	0–1	0–0	0–0	0–0	0 / 34	21–34
Career statistics
Titles / Finals	0 / 0	0 / 0	0 / 0	0 / 1	0 / 0	0 / 0	0 / 0	0 / 0	0 / 0	0 / 0	0 / 0	0 / 0	0 / 0	0 / 0	0 / 0	0 / 1	
Overall win–loss	0–0	0–4	9–15	29–30	15–23	7–12	5–9	8–11	6–8	6–9	28–26	2–7	2–4	5–4	1–3	123–165	
Year-end ranking	250	127	67	41	93	107	134	84	245	55	58	464	171	141	334	42.71%	

Notes
^{a} 2009 Wimbledon Championships counts as 1 win, 0 losses. Jo-Wilfried Tsonga received a walkover in the second round, after Bolelli withdrew.

=== Doubles ===
Current through the 2025 ATP Finals.

Tournament	2005	2006	2007	2008	2009	2010	2011	2012	2013	2014	2015	2016	2017	2018	2019	2020	2021	2022	2023	2024	2025	2026	SR	W–L
Grand Slam tournaments
Australian Open	A	A	A	1R	QF	3R	A	2R	SF	2R	W	2R	A	A	1R	3R	3R	QF	1R	F	F	1R	1 / 16	35–15
French Open	A	A	1R	1R	2R	A	A	1R	A	2R	SF	A	1R	1R	A	2R	3R	A	2R	F	3R		0 / 13	17–13
Wimbledon	A	A	1R	1R	1R	A	A	A	A	2R	1R	A	A	A	A	NH	SF	A	2R	1R	2R		0 / 9	7–9
US Open	A	A	1R	1R	3R	A	SF	A	A	1R	1R	A	3R^{[a]}	2R	A	2R	2R	3R	1R	3R	2R		0 / 13	16–13
Win–loss	0–0	0–0	0–3	0–4	6–4	2–1	4–1	1–2	4–1	3–4	10–3	1–1	2–1	1–2	0–1	4–3	9–4	5–2	2–4	12–4	9–4	0–1	1 / 51	75–50
Year-end championship
ATP Finals	Did not qualify										RR	Did not qualify					Alt	Did not qualify		RR	SF		0 / 3	4–6
National representation
Summer Olympics	Not Held			1R	Not Held			A	Not Held			A	Not Held				A	Not Held		1R	Not Held		0 / 2	0–2
Davis Cup	A	A	Z1	Z1	PO	PO	PO	PO	QF	SF	1R	QF	QF	QF	QR	QF		SF	W	W	W		3 / 11	17–13
Win–loss	0–0	0–0	0–0	0–2	1–0	2–1	1–0	0–0	1–0	2–1	2–0	1–0	1–1	1–1	0–2	1–0	0–0	3–2	0–2	1–3	0–0		3 / 13	17–15
ATP World Tour Masters 1000
Indian Wells Masters	A	A	A	A	A	A	A	A	A	A	F	A	A	A	A	NH	2R	1R	QF	SF	1R	A	0 / 6	9–6
Miami Open	A	A	A	A	1R	A	A	A	A	1R	2R	1R	A	A	A	NH	A	SF	1R	1R	2R	W	1 / 9	10–8
Monte-Carlo Masters	A	QF	A	A	A	A	A	1R	A	2R	F	A	A	SF	A	NH	1R	A	1R	QF	2R		0 / 9	11–9
Madrid Open	A	A	A	1R	1R	A	A	A	A	A	1R	A	A	A	A	NH	A	QF	QF	QF	1R		0 / 7	6–7
Italian Open	A	1R	1R	1R	2R	QF	SF	1R	A	1R	2R	A	1R	1R	1R	1R	A	SF	2R	SF	1R		0 / 17	11–17
Canadian Open	A	A	A	A	A	A	A	A	A	A	A	A	A	A	A	NH	2R	2R	A	QF	1R		0 / 4	4–4
Cincinnati Masters	A	A	A	1R	A	A	A	A	A	A	2R	A	A	A	A	A	1R	1R	A	2R	QF		0 / 6	4–6
Shanghai Masters	NMS				A	A	2R	A	A	A	F	A	A	A	A	NH			A	QF	1R		0 / 4	5–4
Paris Masters	A	A	A	A	A	A	A	A	A	A	A	A	A	A	A	A	1R	2R	A	2R	2R		0 / 4	2–4
Win–loss	0–0	2–2	0–1	1–3	0–3	2–1	4–2	0–2	0–0	1–3	11–7	0–1	0–1	2–2	0–1	0–1	2–5	9–7	5–5	14–9	4–9	5–0	1 / 66	62–65
Career statistics
Titles	0	0	0	0	0	0	2	0	1	0	1	1	0	0	0	0	3	2	1	3	4	2	20	
Finals	0	0	0	0	0	0	2	1	2	0	4	1	0	1	2	0	5	4	3	5	6	2	38	
Overall win–loss	1–1	2–4	1–8	11–18	13–15	7–7	22–6	4–11	14–2	6–8	29–19	7–4	8–8	9–7	13–12	10–10	31–18	39–23	23–22	42–20	37–22	10–4	339–249	
Year-end ranking	593	171	425	113	68	167	39	274	55	143	13	123	171	97	80	68	25	51	55	11	13		57.65%	

Notes
^{a} Bolelli withdrew before the third round of the 2017 US Open due to his partner, Fabio Fognini being disqualified in his 1R singles match

Awards
Preceded by (Russia) Karen Khachanov & (Russia) Andrey Rublev	ATP Fans' Favorite Team; 2024, 2025 (with (Italy) Andrea Vavassori))	Succeeded by Incumbent
