= 2013 Trofeo Faip–Perrel =

Tennis tournament

- Date: 4–10 February
- Edition: 8th
- Draw: 32S / 16D
- Prize money: €42,500+H
- Surface: Hard
- Location: Bergamo, Italy

Champions

Singles
- (Poland) Michał Przysiężny

Doubles
- (Slovakia) Karol Beck / (Slovakia) Andrej Martin
- ATP Challenger Bergamo

The 2013 Trofeo Faip–Perrel was a professional tennis tournament played on hard courts. It was the eighth edition of the tournament which was part of the 2013 ATP Challenger Tour. It took place in Bergamo, Italy between 4 and 10 February 2013.

== Singles main-draw entrants ==
=== Seeds ===
Country	Player	Rank^{1}	Seed
LAT	Ernests Gulbis	136	1
GER	Jan-Lennard Struff	138	2
SUI	Marco Chiudinelli	139	3
BLR	Uladzimir Ignatik	142	4
BEL	Maxime Authom	144	5
SVK	Karol Beck	146	6
ROU	Marius Copil	151	7
UKR	Ivan Sergeyev	152	8

- ^{1} Rankings are as of January 28, 2013.

=== Other entrants ===
The following players received wildcards into the singles main draw:

- (Serbia) Djordje Djokovic
- (Latvia) Ernests Gulbis
- (Italy) Claudio Grassi
- (Sweden) Andreas Vinciguerra

The following player received entry using a protected ranking:

- (Germany) Andreas Beck

The following players received entry from the qualifying draw:

- (Georgia (country)) Nikoloz Basilashvili
- (Italy) Alessandro Bega
- (Austria) Martin Fischer
- (Italy) Viktor Galović

The following player received entry as a lucky loser:

- (Italy) Marco Cecchinato

== Doubles main-draw entrants ==
=== Seeds ===
Country	Player	Country	Player	Rank^{1}	Seed
POL	Tomasz Bednarek	POL	Mateusz Kowalczyk	187	1
AUS	Jordan Kerr	SWE	Andreas Siljeström	222	2
AUT	Martin Fischer	AUT	Philipp Oswald	275	3
ITA	Alessandro Motti	MNE	Goran Tošić	316	4

- ^{1} Rankings are as of January 28, 2013.

=== Other entrants ===
The following pairs received wildcards into the doubles main draw:

- (Uzbekistan) Farrukh Dustov / (Italy) Matteo Volante
- (Italy) Thomas Fabbiano / (Italy) Matteo Trevisan
- (Italy) Andrea Falgheri / (Italy) Stefano Napolitano

The following pair received entry as an alternate:

- (Netherlands) Sander Groen / (Sweden) Andreas Vinciguerra

== Champions ==
=== Singles ===
- (Poland) Michał Przysiężny def. (Germany) Jan-Lennard Struff, 4–6, 7–6^{(7–5)}, 7–6^{(7–5)}

=== Doubles ===
- (Slovakia) Karol Beck / (Slovakia) Andrej Martin def. (Italy) Claudio Grassi / (Israel) Amir Weintraub, 6–3, 3–6, [10–8]
