= 2018 Trofeo Faip–Perrel – Singles =

Perrel – Singles
- 2018 Trofeo Faip–Perrel

Final
- Champion: (Italy) Matteo Berrettini
- Runner-up: (Italy) Stefano Napolitano
- Score: 6–2, 3–6, 6–2

Events
Singles	Doubles
← 2017 ·	Trofeo Faip–Perrel	· 2019 →

Jerzy Janowicz was the defending champion but chose not to defend his title.

Matteo Berrettini won the title after defeating Stefano Napolitano 6–2, 3–6, 6–2 in the final.

== Seeds ==
1. (Italy) Matteo Berrettini (champion)
2. (France) Gleb Sakharov (first round)
3. (Estonia) Jürgen Zopp (semifinals)
4. (Germany) Mats Moraing (second round, retired)
5. (Italy) Lorenzo Sonego (semifinals)
6. (Spain) Jaume Munar (first round)
7. (Italy) Salvatore Caruso (quarterfinals)
8. (Belarus) Uladzimir Ignatik (second round)

== Draw ==
=== Key ===
- Q = Qualifier
- WC = Wild card
- LL = Lucky loser
- Alt = Alternate
- SE = Special exempt
- PR = Protected ranking
- ITF = ITF entry
- JE = Junior exempt
- w/o = Walkover
- r = Retired
- d = Defaulted
- SR = Special ranking

=== Finals ===
Semifinals
1/SE	(Italy) Matteo Berrettini	6	6^{5}	6
3	(Estonia) Jürgen Zopp	3	7^{7}	1
5	(Italy) Lorenzo Sonego	3	6^{2}
(Italy) Stefano Napolitano	6	7^{7}

Final
1/SE	(Italy) Matteo Berrettini	6	3	6
(Italy) Stefano Napolitano	2	6	2

=== Top half ===
First round
1/SE	(Italy) M Berrettini	6	6
(Italy) M Viola	3	1
(Spain) N Kuhn	6^{1}	4
SE	(France) C Lestienne	7^{7}	6
(France) V Millot	6	6
Q	(Croatia) N Serdarušić	1	4
Q	(France) S Doumbia	5	2
7	(Italy) S Caruso	7	6
3	(Estonia) J Zopp	4	6	6
(Spain) B Zapata Miralles	6	2	2
LL	(Italy) L Vanni	6	6
(Spain) P Martínez	3	4
(Czech Republic) A Pavlásek	6	6
(Bosnia and Herzegovina) T Brkić	4	1
Q	(Slovakia) F Horanský	3	0
8	(Belarus) U Ignatik	6	6

Second round
1/SE	(Italy) M Berrettini	6	6^{4}	7
SE	(France) C Lestienne	4	7^{7}	5
(France) V Millot	0	2
7	(Italy) S Caruso	6	6
3	(Estonia) J Zopp	6	7^{7}
LL	(Italy) L Vanni	3	6^{3}
(Czech Republic) A Pavlásek	6	7
8	(Belarus) U Ignatik	4	5

Quarterfinals
1/SE	(Italy) M Berrettini	7^{9}	7
7	(Italy) S Caruso	6^{7}	5
3	(Estonia) J Zopp	6	7
(Czech Republic) A Pavlásek	4	5

Semifinals
1/SE	(Italy) M Berrettini	6	6^{5}	6
3	(Estonia) J Zopp	3	7^{7}	1

=== Bottom half ===
First round
5	(Italy) L Sonego	4	6	6
(Argentina) M Trungelliti	6	3	2
(Bosnia and Herzegovina) A Šetkić	3	6^{2}
WC	(Latvia) E Gulbis	6	7^{7}
(Egypt) M Safwat	7	3	6
(France) B Bonzi	5	6	2
Q	(Lithuania) L Grigelis	2	3
4	(Germany) M Moraing	6	6
6	(Spain) J Munar	5	6^{3}
(Italy) S Napolitano	7	7^{7}
WC	(Spain) A Davidovich Fokina	4	2
WC	(Netherlands) T de Bakker	6	6
WC	(Italy) G Quinzi	6	6
LL	(Italy) A Basso	4	2
(Italy) A Arnaboldi	7^{7}	7
2	(France) G Sakharov	6^{3}	5

Second round
5	(Italy) L Sonego	6	6
WC	(Latvia) E Gulbis	4	3
(Egypt) M Safwat	6	0
4	(Germany) M Moraing	3	0^{r}
(Italy) S Napolitano	6	7
WC	(Netherlands) T de Bakker	3	5
WC	(Italy) G Quinzi	6^{3}	6	3
(Italy) A Arnaboldi	7^{7}	3	6

Quarterfinals
5	(Italy) L Sonego	6	6^{6}	6
(Egypt) M Safwat	3	7^{8}	2
(Italy) S Napolitano	6^{9}	6	6
(Italy) A Arnaboldi	7^{11}	2	1

Semifinals
5	(Italy) L Sonego	3	6^{2}
(Italy) S Napolitano	6	7^{7}
