= 2022 Trofeo Faip–Perrel – Singles =

Perrel – Singles
- 2022 Trofeo Faip–Perrel

Final
- Champion: (Finland) Otto Virtanen
- Runner-up: (Germany) Jan-Lennard Struff
- Score: 6–2, 7–5

Events
Singles	Doubles
← 2021 ·	Trofeo Faip–Perrel	· 2023 →

Holger Rune was the defending champion but chose not to defend his title.

Otto Virtanen won the title after defeating Jan-Lennard Struff 6–2, 7–5 in the final. It was his first Challenger title, and he did not drop a single set en route to the title.

== Seeds ==
1. (Poland) Kamil Majchrzak (first round)
2. (Portugal) Nuno Borges (semifinals)
3. (China) Zhang Zhizhen (second round)
4. (France) Grégoire Barrère (first round)
5. (Netherlands) Tim van Rijthoven (first round)
6. (Czech Republic) Tomáš Macháč (first round)
7. (Chile) Nicolás Jarry (first round)
8. (Spain) Fernando Verdasco (first round)

== Draw ==
=== Key ===
- Q = Qualifier
- WC = Wild card
- LL = Lucky loser
- Alt = Alternate
- SE = Special exempt
- PR = Protected ranking
- ITF = ITF entry
- JE = Junior exempt
- w/o = Walkover
- r = Retired
- d = Defaulted
- SR = Special ranking

=== Finals ===
Semifinals
(Austria) Jurij Rodionov	6	4	2
(Germany) Jan-Lennard Struff	2	6	6
Q	(Finland) Otto Virtanen	6	7
2	(Portugal) Nuno Borges	4	5

Final
(Germany) Jan-Lennard Struff	2	5
Q	(Finland) Otto Virtanen	6	7

=== Top half ===
First round
1	(Poland) K Majchrzak	4	5
A Shevchenko	6	7
(Germany) Y Hanfmann	5	6	6
(Hungary) Z Piros	7	2	2
Q	A Kachmazov	4	6	5
Q	(Turkey) A Çelikbilek	6	2	7
(Austria) J Rodionov	6	6
8	(Spain) F Verdasco	2	3
4	(France) G Barrère	3	1
(Italy) M Arnaldi	6	6
(Belgium) Z Bergs	5	1^{r}
(United Kingdom) L Broady	7	4
(Italy) F Cobolli	1	2
(Germany) J-L Struff	6	6
WC	(Italy) L Nardi	7	7^{7}
6	(Czech Republic) T Macháč	5	6^{3}

Second round
A Shevchenko	6^{6}	6	0
(Germany) Y Hanfmann	7^{8}	4	6
Q	(Turkey) A Çelikbilek	2	4
(Austria) J Rodionov	6	6
(Italy) M Arnaldi	6	1	6
(United Kingdom) L Broady	4	6	3
(Germany) J-L Struff	6	7^{7}
WC	(Italy) L Nardi	4	6^{1}

Quarterfinals
(Germany) Y Hanfmann	6	4	4
(Austria) J Rodionov	4	6	6
(Italy) M Arnaldi	6	1	4
(Germany) J-L Struff	4	6	6

Semifinals
(Austria) J Rodionov	6	4	2
(Germany) J-L Struff	2	6	6

=== Bottom half ===
First round
5/WC	(Netherlands) T van Rijthoven	6	4	4
(Switzerland) D Stricker	3	6	6
Alt	(Bulgaria) D Kuzmanov	6	2	1
(Czech Republic) V Kopřiva	4	6	6
Q	(Finland) O Virtanen	6	7
(France) M Guinard	4	5
WC	(Italy) G Zeppieri	6	3	4
3	(China) Zh Zhang	3	6	6
7	(Chile) N Jarry	6^{4}	6^{4}
Q	(Italy) A Vavassori	7^{7}	7^{7}
Q	E Karlovskiy	5	0
SE	(Croatia) B Gojo	7	6
Q	(Turkey) C İlkel	2	4
(Austria) D Novak	6	6
(Slovakia) J Kovalík	5	3
2	(Portugal) N Borges	7	6

Second round
(Switzerland) D Stricker	6	7
(Czech Republic) V Kopřiva	4	5
Q	(Finland) O Virtanen	6	7^{9}
3	(China) Zh Zhang	4	6^{7}
Q	(Italy) A Vavassori	6	6
SE	(Croatia) B Gojo	1	2
(Austria) D Novak	3	2^{r}
2	(Portugal) N Borges	6	4

Quarterfinals
(Switzerland) D Stricker	4	6^{5}
Q	(Finland) O Virtanen	6	7^{7}
Q	(Italy) A Vavassori	4	4
2	(Portugal) N Borges	6	6

Semifinals
Q	(Finland) O Virtanen	6	7
2	(Portugal) N Borges	4	5
