= 2022 Trofeo Faip–Perrel – Doubles =

Perrel – Doubles
- 2022 Trofeo Faip–Perrel

Final
- Champions: (Germany) Henri Squire (Germany) Jan-Lennard Struff
- Runners-up: (France) Jonathan Eysseric (France) Albano Olivetti
- Score: 6–4, 6–7^{(5–7)}, [10–7]

Events
Singles	Doubles
← 2021 ·	Trofeo Faip–Perrel	· 2023 →

Zdeněk Kolář and Jiří Lehečka were the defending champions but chose not to defend their title.

Henri Squire and Jan-Lennard Struff won the title after defeating Jonathan Eysseric and Albano Olivetti 6–4, 6–7^{(5–7)}, [10–7] in the final.

== Seeds ==
1. (Ukraine) Denys Molchanov / (Pakistan) Aisam-ul-Haq Qureshi (semifinals)
2. (United Kingdom) Jonny O'Mara / (Austria) Philipp Oswald (quarterfinals)
3. (France) Jonathan Eysseric / (France) Albano Olivetti (final)
4. (Czech Republic) Roman Jebavý / (Czech Republic) Adam Pavlásek (first round)

== Draw ==
=== Key ===
- Q = Qualifier
- WC = Wild card
- LL = Lucky loser
- Alt = Alternate
- ITF = ITF entry
- PR = Protected ranking
- SR = Special ranking
- SE = Special exempt
- JE = Junior exempt
- JR = Junior Accelerator Programme entrant
- CO = College Accelerator Programme entrant
- NG = Next Gen Accelerator Program entrant
- w/o = Walkover
- r = Retired
- d = Defaulted

First round
1	(Ukraine) D Molchanov (Pakistan) A-u-H Qureshi	6	6
(Netherlands) S Arends (Croatia) F Škugor	3	4
(Croatia) Z Babić (Greece) Pe Tsitsipas	5	2
(Czech Republic) V Kopřiva (Ukraine) V Sachko	7	6
3	(France) J Eysseric (France) A Olivetti	6	6
A Kachmazov (Kazakhstan) G Lomakin	4	4
(Colombia) N Barrientos (Spain) S Martos Gornés	6^{2}	7^{7}	[10]
(Serbia) I Sabanov (Serbia) M Sabanov	7^{7}	6^{4}	[8]
WC	(Italy) A Vavassori (Italy) Matteo Vavassori	7^{7}	5	[10]
(Jamaica) D Brown (Poland) S Walków	6^{4}	7	[4]
(Germany) F Fallert (Germany) H Jebens	6	6
4	(Czech Republic) R Jebavý (Czech Republic) A Pavlásek	4	3
WC	(Italy) Davide Baccalà (Italy) Simone Puleo	0	3
(Germany) H Squire (Germany) J-L Struff	6	6
(India) P Raja (India) D Sharan	6^{4}	1
2	(United Kingdom) J O'Mara (Austria) P Oswald	7^{7}	6

Quarterfinals
1	(Ukraine) D Molchanov (Pakistan) A-u-H Qureshi	6	6
(Czech Republic) V Kopřiva (Ukraine) V Sachko	1	4
3	(France) J Eysseric (France) A Olivetti	6	6
(Colombia) N Barrientos (Spain) S Martos Gornés	2	1
WC	(Italy) A Vavassori (Italy) M Vavassori	4	4
(Germany) F Fallert (Germany) H Jebens	6	6
(Germany) H Squire (Germany) J-L Struff	6	6
2	(United Kingdom) J O'Mara (Austria) P Oswald	1	4

Semifinals
1	(Ukraine) D Molchanov (Pakistan) A-u-H Qureshi	4	6	[9]
3	(France) J Eysseric (France) A Olivetti	6	4	[11]
(Germany) F Fallert (Germany) H Jebens	6	3	[5]
(Germany) H Squire (Germany) J-L Struff	4	6	[10]

Final
3	(France) J Eysseric (France) A Olivetti	4	7^{7}	[7]
(Germany) H Squire (Germany) J-L Struff	6	6^{5}	[10]
