= 2018 Trofeo Faip–Perrel – Doubles =

Perrel – Doubles
- 2018 Trofeo Faip–Perrel

Final
- Champions: (United Kingdom) Scott Clayton (United Kingdom) Jonny O'Mara
- Runners-up: (Lithuania) Laurynas Grigelis (Italy) Alessandro Motti
- Score: 5–7, 6–3, [15–13]

Events
Singles	Doubles
← 2017 ·	Trofeo Faip–Perrel	· 2019 →

Julian Knowle and Adil Shamasdin were the defending champions but chose not to defend their title.

Scott Clayton and Jonny O'Mara won the title after defeating Laurynas Grigelis and Alessandro Motti 5–7, 6–3, [15–13] in the final.

== Seeds ==
1. (Belgium) Sander Gillé / (Belgium) Joran Vliegen (quarterfinals)
2. (Monaco) Romain Arneodo / (Austria) Tristan-Samuel Weissborn (quarterfinals)
3. (Croatia) Marin Draganja / (Croatia) Tomislav Draganja (first round)
4. (Australia) Rameez Junaid / (Slovakia) Igor Zelenay (semifinals)

== Draw ==
=== Key ===
- Q = Qualifier
- WC = Wild card
- LL = Lucky loser
- Alt = Alternate
- SE = Special exempt
- PR = Protected ranking
- ITF = ITF entry
- JE = Junior exempt
- w/o = Walkover
- r = Retired
- d = Defaulted
- SR = Special ranking

First round
1	(Belgium) S Gillé (Belgium) J Vliegen	6^{2}	6	[10]
(Belarus) U Ignatik (Ukraine) V Uzhylovskyi	7^{7}	3	[8]
(United States) N Lammons (United States) A Lawson	7^{7}	6^{4}	[12]
WC	(Italy) F Baldi (Italy) G Quinzi	6^{5}	7^{7}	[10]
3	(Croatia) M Draganja (Croatia) T Draganja	7^{7}	2	[5]
(Lithuania) L Grigelis (Italy) A Motti	6^{0}	6	[10]
(Spain) P Martínez (Spain) J Munar	7	2	[10]
WC	(Italy) D Bracciali (Italy) L Vanni	5	6	[7]
WC	(Italy) J Ocleppo (Italy) A Vavassori	6	6^{2}	[10]
(Italy) S Caruso (Italy) L Sonego	3	7^{7}	[6]
(Poland) T Bednarek (Poland) G Panfil	1	6^{1}
4	(Australia) R Junaid (Slovakia) I Zelenay	6	7^{7}
(France) B Bonzi (Hungary) G Borsos	3	6^{4}
(United Kingdom) S Clayton (United Kingdom) J O'Mara	6	7^{7}
(Italy) M Berrettini (Italy) F Cipolla	2	2
2	(Monaco) R Arneodo (Austria) T-S Weissborn	6	6

Quarterfinals
1	(Belgium) S Gillé (Belgium) J Vliegen	6^{5}	6^{4}
(United States) N Lammons (United States) A Lawson	7^{7}	7^{7}
(Lithuania) L Grigelis (Italy) A Motti	6	6
(Spain) P Martínez (Spain) J Munar	2	4
WC	(Italy) J Ocleppo (Italy) A Vavassori	6	6^{6}	[10]
4	(Australia) R Junaid (Slovakia) I Zelenay	3	7^{8}	[12]
(United Kingdom) S Clayton (United Kingdom) J O'Mara	6	7^{7}
2	(Monaco) R Arneodo (Austria) T-S Weissborn	3	6^{3}

Semifinals
(United States) N Lammons (United States) A Lawson	3	7^{7}	[9]
(Lithuania) L Grigelis (Italy) A Motti	6	6^{4}	[11]
4	(Australia) R Junaid (Slovakia) I Zelenay	6	6^{5}	[8]
(United Kingdom) S Clayton (United Kingdom) J O'Mara	3	7^{7}	[10]

Final
(Lithuania) L Grigelis (Italy) A Motti	7	3	[13]
(United Kingdom) S Clayton (United Kingdom) J O'Mara	5	6	[15]
