= 2017 Trofeo Faip–Perrel – Singles =

Tennis contest held in Bergamo

Perrel – Singles
- 2017 Trofeo Faip–Perrel

Final
- Champion: (Poland) Jerzy Janowicz
- Runner-up: (France) Quentin Halys
- Score: 6–4, 6–4

Events
Singles	Doubles
← 2016 ·	Trofeo Faip–Perrel	· 2018 →

Pierre-Hugues Herbert was the defending champion but withdrew before the tournament began.

Jerzy Janowicz won the title after defeating Quentin Halys 6–4, 6–4 in the final.

== Seeds ==
1. (Italy) Andreas Seppi (first round)
2. (Slovakia) Lukáš Lacko (second round)
3. (France) Pierre-Hugues Herbert (withdrew)
4. (Italy) Luca Vanni (first round)
5. (Belarus) Uladzimir Ignatik (second round)
6. (Germany) Peter Gojowczyk (withdrew)
7. (France) Quentin Halys (final)
8. (Germany) Maximilian Marterer (first round)
9. (Italy) Stefano Napolitano (first round)
10. (Belarus) Ilya Ivashka (second round)

== Draw ==
=== Key ===
- Q = Qualifier
- WC = Wild card
- LL = Lucky loser
- Alt = Alternate
- ITF = ITF entry
- PR = Protected ranking
- SR = Special ranking
- SE = Special exempt
- JE = Junior exempt
- JR = Junior Accelerator Programme entrant
- CO = College Accelerator Programme entrant
- NG = Next Gen Accelerator Program entrant
- w/o = Walkover
- r = Retired
- d = Defaulted

=== Finals ===
Semifinals
7	(France) Quentin Halys	7^{7}	7^{7}
(Kazakhstan) Andrey Golubev	6^{5}	6^{4}
(Serbia) Filip Krajinović	3	3
WC	(Poland) Jerzy Janowicz	6	6

Final
7	(France) Quentin Halys	4	4
WC	(Poland) Jerzy Janowicz	6	6

=== Top half ===
First round
1/WC	(Italy) A Seppi	4	2
Q	(Germany) Y Hanfmann	6	6
(Germany) D Brands	7^{7}	6
(Egypt) M Safwat	6^{2}	4
(Germany) D Masur	6	7^{7}
(Spain) A Menéndez-Maceiras	2	6^{4}
(Czech Republic) Z Kolář	6^{2}	0
7	(France) Q Halys	7^{7}	6
4	(Italy) L Vanni	5	6	3
LL	(Germany) N Langer	7	4	6
(Serbia) L Đere	6^{6}	5
WC	(Italy) M Berrettini	7^{8}	7
(Kazakhstan) A Golubev	6	7^{9}
(Kazakhstan) A Nedovyesov	4	6^{7}
(Belgium) Y Reuter	3	1
10	(Belarus) I Ivashka	6	6

Second round
Q	(Germany) Y Hanfmann	6^{5}	7^{7}	6
(Germany) D Brands	7^{7}	6^{5}	3
(Germany) D Masur	6	3	4
7	(France) Q Halys	4	6	6
LL	(Germany) N Langer	4	5
WC	(Italy) M Berrettini	6	7
(Kazakhstan) A Golubev	6	6
10	(Belarus) I Ivashka	2	1

Quarterfinals
Q	(Germany) Y Hanfmann	4	3
7	(France) Q Halys	6	6
WC	(Italy) M Berrettini	6	6^{4}	3
(Kazakhstan) A Golubev	3	7^{7}	6

Semifinals
7	(France) Q Halys	7^{7}	7^{7}
(Kazakhstan) A Golubev	6^{5}	6^{4}

=== Bottom half ===
First round
5	(Belarus) U Ignatik	6	6
(Italy) M Donati	2	0
(Serbia) F Krajinović	7^{13}	6
(Italy) L Giustino	6^{11}	2
Q	(France) R Boutillier	7^{7}	6
WC	(Italy) A Arnaboldi	6^{0}	1
LL	(Italy) A Bega	6	6
9	(Italy) S Napolitano	4	1
8	(Germany) M Marterer	3	4
WC	(Poland) J Janowicz	6	6
(Germany) Jeremy Jahn	2	3
(Bosnia and Herzegovina) M Bašić	6	6
Q	(Belarus) E Gerasimov	6	7^{7}
Q	(Germany) M Bachinger	4	6^{5}
(Serbia) P Krstin	1	2
2	(Slovakia) L Lacko	6	6

Second round
5	(Belarus) U Ignatik	4	6	5
(Serbia) F Krajinović	6	3	7
Q	(France) R Boutillier	6	6
LL	(Italy) A Bega	3	3
WC	(Poland) J Janowicz	7^{7}	6
(Bosnia and Herzegovina) M Bašić	6^{4}	2
Q	(Belarus) E Gerasimov	6	1	6
2	(Slovakia) L Lacko	4	6	3

Quarterfinals
(Serbia) F Krajinović	3	6	6
Q	(France) R Boutillier	6	2	4
WC	(Poland) J Janowicz	6^{1}	6	7
Q	(Belarus) E Gerasimov	7^{7}	3	5

Semifinals
(Serbia) F Krajinović	3	3
WC	(Poland) J Janowicz	6	6
