= 2020 Trofeo Faip–Perrel – Singles =

Perrel – Singles
- 2020 Trofeo Faip–Perrel

Events
Singles	Doubles
← 2019 ·	Trofeo Faip–Perrel	· 2021 →

Jannik Sinner was the defending champion but chose not to defend his title.

The final between Illya Marchenko and Enzo Couacaud was canceled due to the threat of coronavirus.

== Seeds ==
All seeds receive a bye into the second round.

1. (Italy) Lorenzo Giustino (third round)
2. (Italy) Roberto Marcora (quarterfinals)
3. (Portugal) Frederico Ferreira Silva (second round)
4. (Argentina) Marco Trungelliti (second round)
5. (Turkey) Cem İlkel (quarterfinals)
6. (France) Constant Lestienne (second round)
7. (France) Enzo Couacaud (finalist)
8. (Japan) Hiroki Moriya (second round)
9. (Italy) Matteo Viola (second round)
10. (France) Tristan Lamasine (second round)
11. (Czech Republic) Zdeněk Kolář (third round)
12. (Russia) Roman Safiullin (third round, retired)
13. (Serbia) Peđa Krstin (third round)
14. (France) Mathias Bourgue (second round, retired)
15. (France) Hugo Gaston (semifinals)
16. (Italy) Filippo Baldi (third round)

== Draw ==
=== Key ===
- Q = Qualifier
- WC = Wild card
- LL = Lucky loser
- Alt = Alternate
- SE = Special exempt
- PR = Protected ranking
- ITF = ITF entry
- JE = Junior exempt
- w/o = Walkover
- r = Retired
- d = Defaulted
- SR = Special ranking

=== Finals ===
Quarterfinals
15	(France) Hugo Gaston	6	6
5	(Turkey) Cem İlkel	4	4
(France) Baptiste Crepatte	7^{7}	6^{3}	0
(Ukraine) Illya Marchenko	6^{5}	7^{7}	6
(Italy) Andrea Arnaboldi	4	4
Q	(Chinese Taipei) Tseng Chun-hsin	6	6
7	(France) Enzo Couacaud	7^{7}	6
2	(Italy) Roberto Marcora	6^{4}	3

Semifinals
15	(France) Hugo Gaston	6	4	4
(Ukraine) Illya Marchenko	4	6	6
Q	(Chinese Taipei) Tseng Chun-hsin	6	3	6^{5}
7	(France) Enzo Couacaud	4	6	7^{7}

Final
(Ukraine) Illya Marchenko
7	(France) Enzo Couacaud

=== Top half ===
==== Section 1 ====
First round
(Russia) I Gakhov	3	5
(Croatia) N Serdarušić	6	7
(France) H Grenier	7	6
(Croatia) M Pecotić	5	3
(Italy) R Brancaccio	3	6	6
(Turkey) A Çelikbilek	6	0	1
(Norway) V Durasovic	7	6
WC	(Italy) L Nardi	5	3

Second round
1	(Italy) L Giustino	6^{10}	6	7^{9}
(Croatia) N Serdarušić	7^{12}	3	6^{7}
(France) H Grenier	3	0
15	(France) H Gaston	6	6
9	(Italy) M Viola	4	4
(Italy) R Brancaccio	6	6
(Norway) V Durasovic	3	4
5	(Turkey) C İlkel	6	6

Third round
1	(Italy) L Giustino	3	6	4
15	(France) H Gaston	6	3	6
(Italy) R Brancaccio	1	6^{2}
5	(Turkey) C İlkel	6	7^{7}

Quarterfinals
15	(France) H Gaston	6	6
5	(Turkey) C İlkel	4	4

==== Section 2 ====
First round
(France) Baptiste Crepatte	6	6
(Italy) L Musetti	3	2
(Poland) D Michalski	6	4	6
WC	(Italy) F Maestrelli	2	6	2
(Bosnia and Herzegovina) N Fatić	4	6^{4}
Q	(France) S Doumbia	6	7^{7}
(Ukraine) I Marchenko	6	3	6
(Italy) A Pellegrino	4	6	1

Second round
3	(Portugal) F Ferreira Silva	3	4
(France) B Crepatte	6	6
(Poland) D Michalski	6	2
14	(France) M Bourgue	4	0^{r}
12	(Russia) R Safiullin	5
Q	(France) S Doumbia	4^{r}
(Ukraine) I Marchenko	6	6
8	(Japan) H Moriya	1	4

Third round
(France) B Crepatte	2	6	6
(Poland) D Michalski	6	4	3
12	(Russia) R Safiullin	5	0^{r}
(Ukraine) I Marchenko	7	0

Quarterfinals
(France) B Crepatte	7^{7}	6^{3}	0
(Ukraine) I Marchenko	6^{5}	7^{7}	6

=== Bottom half ===
==== Section 3 ====
First round
(Italy) A Arnaboldi	7^{7}	6
(Slovakia) L Klein	6^{4}	4
(Slovakia) A Molčan	6^{1}	7^{7}	5
(Italy) A Vavassori	7^{7}	6^{5}	7
LL	(Czech Republic) Pavel Nejedlý	6	6
(Italy) J Ocleppo	2	4
Q	(Chinese Taipei) C-h Tseng	6	6
WC	(Sweden) Leo Borg	3	1

Second round
6	(France) C Lestienne	6	2	3
(Italy) A Arnaboldi	2	6	6
(Italy) A Vavassori	6^{2}	6	4
11	(Czech Republic) Z Kolář	7^{7}	2	6
16	(Italy) F Baldi	6	6
LL	(Czech Republic) P Nejedlý	3	3
Q	(Chinese Taipei) C-h Tseng	7^{7}	6
4	(Argentina) M Trungelliti	6^{4}	3

Third round
(Italy) A Arnaboldi	6	6
11	(Czech Republic) Z Kolář	3	4
16	(Italy) F Baldi	4	2
Q	(Chinese Taipei) C-h Tseng	6	6

Quarterfinals
(Italy) A Arnaboldi	4	4
Q	(Chinese Taipei) C-h Tseng	6	6

==== Section 4 ====
First round
(Croatia) V Galović	6	6
(Romania) A Jecan	1	2
(Italy) Fabrizio Ornago	1	2
(Italy) L Vanni	6	6
WC	(Italy) M Gigante	7^{8}	6^{3}	5
(Belgium) A De Greef	6^{6}	7^{7}	7
(Italy) G Zeppieri	6	3	7^{11}
WC	(Italy) F Cobolli	3	6	6^{9}

Second round
7	(France) E Couacaud	6	6
(Croatia) V Galović	2	4
(Italy) L Vanni	6	6
10	(France) T Lamasine	3	4
13	(Serbia) P Krstin	6	6
(Belgium) A De Greef	2	4
(Italy) G Zeppieri	5	2
2	(Italy) R Marcora	7	6

Third round
7	(France) E Couacaud	6	6
(Italy) L Vanni	3	2
13	(Serbia) P Krstin	2	3
2	(Italy) R Marcora	6	6

Quarterfinals
7	(France) E Couacaud	7^{7}	6
2	(Italy) R Marcora	6^{4}	3
