= 2021 Trofeo Faip–Perrel – Singles =

Perrel – Singles
- 2021 Trofeo Faip–Perrel

Final
- Champion: (Denmark) Holger Rune
- Runner-up: (Turkey) Cem İlkel
- Score: 7–5, 7–6^{(8–6)}

Events
Singles	Doubles
← 2020 ·	Trofeo Faip–Perrel	· 2022 →

There was no defending champion as the final of the previous edition was canceled due to the coronavirus pandemic.

Holger Rune won the title after defeating Cem İlkel 7–5, 7–6^{(8–6)} in the final.

== Seeds ==
1. (Slovakia) Alex Molčan (semifinals)
2. (Austria) Dennis Novak (quarterfinals)
3. (Denmark) Holger Rune (champion)
4. (Moldova) Radu Albot (second round)
5. (United Kingdom) Liam Broady (quarterfinals)
6. (Czech Republic) Zdeněk Kolář (quarterfinals)
7. (Serbia) Nikola Milojević (first round)
8. (Bosnia and Herzegovina) Damir Džumhur (quarterfinals)

== Draw ==
=== Key ===
- Q = Qualifier
- WC = Wild card
- LL = Lucky loser
- Alt = Alternate
- SE = Special exempt
- PR = Protected ranking
- ITF = ITF entry
- JE = Junior exempt
- w/o = Walkover
- r = Retired
- d = Defaulted
- SR = Special ranking

=== Finals ===
Semifinals
1	(Slovakia) Alex Molčan	5	6	4
3	(Denmark) Holger Rune	7	1	6
(Turkey) Cem İlkel	7^{7}	5	6
Q	(Hungary) Fábián Marozsán	6^{2}	7	4

Final
3	(Denmark) Holger Rune	7	7^{8}
(Turkey) Cem İlkel	5	6^{6}

=== Top half ===
First round
1	(Slovakia) A Molčan	6^{4}	6	6
LL	(Croatia) N Serdarušić	7^{7}	4	2
Q	(Bosnia and Herzegovina) N Fatić	6	6
(Egypt) M Safwat	4	2
(Australia) C O'Connell	6	7^{7}
PR	(Germany) Y Maden	3	6^{5}
(Kazakhstan) M Kukushkin	3	1
6	(Czech Republic) Z Kolář	6	6
3	(Denmark) H Rune	6	6
(France) M Bourgue	3	4
Q	(Italy) Luca Potenza	4	3
(Slovakia) F Horanský	6	6
(Czech Republic) J Lehečka	6	7
(France) H Grenier	3	5
WC	(Italy) F Cobolli	4	5
8	(Bosnia and Herzegovina) D Džumhur	6	7

Second round
1	(Slovakia) A Molčan	6	6
Q	(Bosnia and Herzegovina) N Fatić	1	4
(Australia) C O'Connell	7	6^{5}	5
6	(Czech Republic) Z Kolář	5	7^{7}	7
3	(Denmark) H Rune	5	6	6
(Slovakia) F Horanský	7	4	2
(Czech Republic) J Lehečka	4	4
8	(Bosnia and Herzegovina) D Džumhur	6	6

Quarterfinals
1	(Slovakia) A Molčan	6	6
6	(Czech Republic) Z Kolář	4	4
3	(Denmark) H Rune	7^{11}	2	6
8	(Bosnia and Herzegovina) D Džumhur	6^{9}	6	1

Semifinals
1	(Slovakia) A Molčan	5	6	4
3	(Denmark) H Rune	7	1	6

=== Bottom half ===
First round
5	(United Kingdom) L Broady	6	3	6
(Serbia) D Petrović	3	6	3
(Ukraine) I Marchenko	7^{7}	6
WC	(Italy) L Nardi	6^{1}	4
Q	(Russia) P Kotov	6	1	6^{5}
(Turkey) C İlkel	4	6	7^{7}
Alt	(France) M Janvier	7	5	4
4	(Moldova) R Albot	5	7	6
7	(Serbia) N Milojević	6	1	3
Q	(Hungary) F Marozsán	4	6	6
Alt	(Ukraine) S Stakhovsky	6	6^{4}	7^{7}
WC	(Italy) M Arnaldi	3	7^{7}	6^{5}
(Italy) F Gaio	3	3
(Russia) E Donskoy	6	6
(Italy) R Marcora	6^{4}	6^{2}
2	(Austria) D Novak	7^{7}	7^{7}

Second round
5	(United Kingdom) L Broady	6	4	6
(Ukraine) I Marchenko	4	6	3
(Turkey) C İlkel	7	6
4	(Moldova) R Albot	5	3
Q	(Hungary) F Marozsán	7	6
Alt	(Ukraine) S Stakhovsky	5	2
(Russia) E Donskoy	3	6	1
2	(Austria) D Novak	6	2	6

Quarterfinals
5	(United Kingdom) L Broady	5	6	1
(Turkey) C İlkel	7	3	6
Q	(Hungary) F Marozsán	7	6
2	(Austria) D Novak	5	1

Semifinals
(Turkey) C İlkel	7^{7}	5	6
Q	(Hungary) F Marozsán	6^{2}	7	4
