= 2020 Trofeo Faip–Perrel – Doubles =

Perrel – Doubles
- 2020 Trofeo Faip–Perrel

Final
- Champions: (Czech Republic) Zdeněk Kolář (Italy) Julian Ocleppo
- Runners-up: (Switzerland) Luca Margaroli (Italy) Andrea Vavassori
- Score: 6–4, 6–3

Events
Singles	Doubles
← 2019 ·	Trofeo Faip–Perrel	· 2021 →

Laurynas Grigelis and Zdeněk Kolář were the defending champions but only Kolář chose to defend his title, partnering Julian Ocleppo. Kolář successfully defended his title after defeating Luca Margaroli and Andrea Vavassori 6–4, 6–3 in the final.

== Seeds ==
1. (India) Purav Raja / (Canada) Adil Shamasdin (quarterfinals)
2. (Switzerland) Luca Margaroli / (Italy) Andrea Vavassori (final)
3. (Kazakhstan) Andrey Golubev / (Kazakhstan) Aleksandr Nedovyesov (quarterfinals)
4. (France) Sadio Doumbia / (France) Fabien Reboul (quarterfinals)

== Draw ==
=== Key ===
- Q = Qualifier
- WC = Wild card
- LL = Lucky loser
- Alt = Alternate
- SE = Special exempt
- PR = Protected ranking
- ITF = ITF entry
- JE = Junior exempt
- w/o = Walkover
- r = Retired
- d = Defaulted
- SR = Special ranking

First round
1	(India) P Raja (Canada) A Shamasdin	6	3	[10]
(Croatia) N Serdarušić (Chinese Taipei) C-h Tseng	4	6	[3]
(Czech Republic) Z Kolář (Italy) J Ocleppo	7	6^{9}	[10]
(France) H Gaston (France) C Lestienne	5	7^{11}	[8]
4	(France) S Doumbia (France) F Reboul	6^{4}	6	[10]
WC	(Italy) A Arnaboldi (Italy) L Vanni	7^{7}	3	[3]
WC	(Italy) R Brancaccio (Italy) G Zeppieri	7	3	[9]
(Italy) M Bortolotti (Croatia) V Galović	5	6	[11]
(France) E Couacaud (France) T Lamasine	5	7	[6]
(Italy) F Baldi (Italy) A Pellegrino	7	5	[10]
(Croatia) T Draganja (Spain) S Martos Gornés	1	0
3	(Kazakhstan) A Golubev (Kazakhstan) A Nedovyesov	6	6
(Ukraine) I Marchenko (Russia) R Safiullin	w/o
(Italy) L Giustino (Argentina) M Trungelliti
WC	(Italy) L Nardi (Italy) L Rottoli	2	3
2	(Switzerland) L Margaroli (Italy) A Vavassori	6	6

Quarterfinals
1	(India) P Raja (Canada) A Shamasdin	3	5
(Czech Republic) Z Kolář (Italy) J Ocleppo	6	7
4	(France) S Doumbia (France) F Reboul	4	7^{7}	[14]
(Italy) M Bortolotti (Croatia) V Galović	6	6^{2}	[16]
(Italy) F Baldi (Italy) A Pellegrino	6	7
3	(Kazakhstan) A Golubev (Kazakhstan) A Nedovyesov	3	5
(Ukraine) I Marchenko (Russia) R Safiullin
2	(Switzerland) L Margaroli (Italy) A Vavassori	w/o

Semifinals
(Czech Republic) Z Kolář (Italy) J Ocleppo	6	6
(Italy) M Bortolotti (Croatia) V Galović	2	3
(Italy) F Baldi (Italy) A Pellegrino	7^{7}	1	[7]
2	(Switzerland) L Margaroli (Italy) A Vavassori	6^{3}	6	[10]

Final
(Czech Republic) Z Kolář (Italy) J Ocleppo	6	6
2	(Switzerland) L Margaroli (Italy) A Vavassori	4	3
