= 2017 Trofeo Faip–Perrel – Doubles =

Perrel – Doubles
- 2017 Trofeo Faip–Perrel

Final
- Champions: (Austria) Julian Knowle (Canada) Adil Shamasdin
- Runners-up: (Croatia) Dino Marcan (Austria) Tristan-Samuel Weissborn
- Score: 6–3, 6–3

Events
Singles	Doubles
← 2016 ·	Trofeo Faip–Perrel	· 2018 →

Ken and Neal Skupski were the defending champions but chose not to defend their title.

Julian Knowle and Adil Shamasdin won the title after defeating Dino Marcan and Tristan-Samuel Weissborn 6–3, 6–3 in the final.

== Seeds ==
1. (Austria) Julian Knowle / (Canada) Adil Shamasdin (champions)
2. (Germany) Andre Begemann / (Belarus) Aliaksandr Bury (semifinals)
3. (Croatia) Dino Marcan / (Austria) Tristan-Samuel Weissborn (final)
4. (Germany) Kevin Krawietz / (France) Albano Olivetti (quarterfinals)

== Draw ==
=== Key ===
- Q = Qualifier
- WC = Wild card
- LL = Lucky loser
- Alt = Alternate
- SE = Special exempt
- PR = Protected ranking
- ITF = ITF entry
- JE = Junior exempt
- w/o = Walkover
- r = Retired
- d = Defaulted
- SR = Special ranking

First round
1	(Austria) J Knowle (Canada) A Shamasdin	6	6
(Italy) A Motti (Belgium) J Vliegen	4	4
WC	(Italy) M Berrettini (Italy) L Sonego	3	5
(Germany) G Kretschmer (Slovakia) I Zelenay	6	7
4	(Germany) K Krawietz (France) A Olivetti	7^{9}	6
(Lithuania) L Grigelis (Australia) R Junaid	6^{7}	4
WC	(Italy) A Arnaboldi (Italy) S Napolitano	6	6
(Uruguay) A Behar (Kazakhstan) A Golubev	2	2
(Italy) R Ghedin (Germany) A Mies	6	6
(Belarus) Y Shyla (Belarus) A Vasilevski	1	4
(Serbia) L Đere (Serbia) Ilija Vučić	4	4
3	(Croatia) D Marcan (Austria) T-S Weissborn	6	6
(Belarus) I Ivashka (Kazakhstan) A Nedovyesov	2	7^{7}	[6]
(France) Q Halys (Switzerland) L Margaroli	6	6^{4}	[10]
WC	(Italy) G Mager (Italy) A Vavassori	1	1
2	(Germany) A Begemann (Belarus) A Bury	6	6

Quarterfinals
1	(Austria) J Knowle (Canada) A Shamasdin	5	7^{7}	[10]
(Germany) G Kretschmer (Slovakia) I Zelenay	7	6^{2}	[3]
4	(Germany) K Krawietz (France) A Olivetti	6	3	[8]
WC	(Italy) A Arnaboldi (Italy) S Napolitano	4	6	[10]
(Italy) R Ghedin (Germany) A Mies	3	4
3	(Croatia) D Marcan (Austria) T-S Weissborn	6	6
(France) Q Halys (Switzerland) L Margaroli	2	6^{3}
2	(Germany) A Begemann (Belarus) A Bury	6	7^{7}

Semifinals
1	(Austria) J Knowle (Canada) A Shamasdin	7^{7}	6
WC	(Italy) A Arnaboldi (Italy) S Napolitano	6^{4}	3
3	(Croatia) D Marcan (Austria) T-S Weissborn	4	6	[12]
2	(Germany) A Begemann (Belarus) A Bury	6	3	[10]

Final
1	(Austria) J Knowle (Canada) A Shamasdin	6	6
3	(Croatia) D Marcan (Austria) T-S Weissborn	3	3
