= 2019 Trofeo Faip–Perrel – Singles =

Tennis contest held in Bergamo

Perrel – Singles
- 2019 Trofeo Faip–Perrel

Final
- Champion: (Italy) Jannik Sinner
- Runner-up: (Italy) Roberto Marcora
- Score: 6–3, 6–1

Events
Singles	Doubles
← 2018 ·	Trofeo Faip–Perrel	· 2020 →

Matteo Berrettini was the defending champion but chose not to defend his title.

Jannik Sinner won the title after defeating Roberto Marcora 6–3, 6–1 in the final.

== Seeds ==
All seeds receive a bye into the second round.

1. (Russia) Evgeny Donskoy (third round)
2. (Italy) Stefano Travaglia (withdrew)
3. (Kazakhstan) Alexander Bublik (second round, retired)
4. (Italy) Gianluigi Quinzi (quarterfinals)
5. (Italy) Luca Vanni (quarterfinals)
6. (France) Quentin Halys (second round)
7. (Italy) Filippo Baldi (withdrew)
8. (Germany) Daniel Brands (second round)
9. (Italy) Salvatore Caruso (second round)
10. (Italy) Lorenzo Giustino (third round)
11. (Egypt) Mohamed Safwat (second round)
12. (Slovakia) Filip Horanský (second round)
13. (United Kingdom) Jay Clarke (third round)
14. (Italy) Stefano Napolitano (quarterfinals)
15. (Belgium) Arthur De Greef (semifinals)
16. (Netherlands) Tallon Griekspoor (second round)

== Draw ==
=== Key ===
- Q = Qualifier
- WC = Wild card
- LL = Lucky loser
- Alt = Alternate
- ITF = ITF entry
- PR = Protected ranking
- SR = Special ranking
- SE = Special exempt
- JE = Junior exempt
- JR = Junior Accelerator Programme entrant
- CO = College Accelerator Programme entrant
- NG = Next Gen Accelerator Program entrant
- w/o = Walkover
- r = Retired
- d = Defaulted

=== Finals ===
Quarterfinals
14	(Italy) Stefano Napolitano	1	3
(France) Tristan Lamasine	6	6
4	(Italy) Gianluigi Quinzi	2	3
WC	(Italy) Jannik Sinner	6	6
5	(Italy) Luca Vanni	6^{2}	4
15	(Belgium) Arthur De Greef	7^{7}	6
(Italy) Roberto Marcora	7^{7}	6
(United Kingdom) Jan Choinski	6^{3}	3

Semifinals
(France) Tristan Lamasine	2	3
WC	(Italy) Jannik Sinner	6	6
15	(Belgium) Arthur De Greef	6^{3}	6	1
(Italy) Roberto Marcora	7^{7}	4	6

Final
WC	(Italy) Jannik Sinner	6	6
(Italy) Roberto Marcora	3	1

=== Top half ===
==== Section 1 ====
First round
(Germany) D Masur	3	6	2
(Spain) B Zapata Miralles	6	3	6
(Turkey) C İlkel	3	6	7
ITF	(Spain) J Barranco Cosano	6	2	5
(France) T Lamasine	6	6
WC	(Italy) J Ocleppo	3	4
(Croatia) N Serdarušić	3	6	4
ITF	(Italy) R Brancaccio	6	4	6

Second round
1	(Russia) E Donskoy	6	6
(Spain) B Zapata Miralles	4	2
(Turkey) C İlkel	3	4
14	(Italy) S Napolitano	6	6
12	(Slovakia) F Horanský	3	1
(France) T Lamasine	6	6
ITF	(Italy) R Brancaccio	6	6
6	(France) Q Halys	4	1

Third round
1	(Russia) E Donskoy	3	6^{10}
14	(Italy) S Napolitano	6	7^{12}
(France) T Lamasine	6	6
ITF	(Italy) R Brancaccio	3	4

Quarterfinals
14	(Italy) S Napolitano	1	3
(France) T Lamasine	6	6

==== Section 2 ====
First round
WC	(Italy) L Musetti	5	4
ITF	(Russia) R Safiullin	7	6
(France) E Benchetrit	6	3	6
(Spain) M Vilella Martínez	4	6	4
WC	(Italy) J Sinner	7^{7}	6
(Austria) L Miedler	6^{3}	1
(Croatia) V Galović	4	6	6
WC	(Italy) G Zeppieri	6	3	4

Second round
4	(Italy) G Quinzi	6	4	7^{7}
ITF	(Russia) R Safiullin	3	6	6^{4}
(France) E Benchetrit	6	6
16	(Netherlands) T Griekspoor	3	4
9	(Italy) S Caruso	2	6	2
WC	(Italy) J Sinner	6	2	6
(Croatia) V Galović	7	7^{7}
8	(Germany) D Brands	5	6^{5}

Third round
4	(Italy) G Quinzi	7^{10}	6
(France) E Benchetrit	6^{8}	2
WC	(Italy) J Sinner	7	1	6
(Croatia) V Galović	5	6	4

Quarterfinals
4	(Italy) G Quinzi	2	3
WC	(Italy) J Sinner	6	6

=== Bottom half ===
==== Section 3 ====
First round
(Spain) C Taberner	7^{7}	6
(Netherlands) S Griekspoor	6^{5}	3
(Czech Republic) Z Kolář	7^{7}	6
WC	(Italy) L Caruana	6^{2}	3
ITF	(Germany) Peter Heller	6	5	3
(Serbia) D Petrović	3	7	6
Q	(France) Baptiste Crepatte	7^{7}	6^{2}	6
(Germany) D Brown	6^{4}	7^{7}	3

Second round
5	(Italy) L Vanni	7^{7}	6
(Spain) C Taberner	6^{5}	2
(Czech Republic) Z Kolář	2	1
10	(Italy) L Giustino	6	6
15	(Belgium) A De Greef	6	6
(Serbia) D Petrović	3	4
Q	(France) B Crepatte	6	5
3	(Kazakhstan) A Bublik	3	2^{r}

Third round
5	(Italy) L Vanni	6	6
10	(Italy) L Giustino	3	1
15	(Belgium) A De Greef	6	6
Q	(France) B Crepatte	2	4

Quarterfinals
5	(Italy) L Vanni	6^{2}	4
15	(Belgium) A De Greef	7^{7}	6

==== Section 4 ====
First round
(Bosnia and Herzegovina) T Brkić	4	4
Q	(Italy) R Bonadio	6	6
(Lithuania) L Grigelis	0	3
(Italy) R Marcora	6	6
(Italy) M Viola	4	4
(Belarus) U Ignatik	6	6
(France) B Bonzi	0	2^{r}
(United Kingdom) J Choinski	6	4

Second round
Alt	(Italy) A Vavassori	7	5	6
Q	(Italy) R Bonadio	5	7	4
(Italy) R Marcora	7^{10}	6
11	(Egypt) M Safwat	6^{8}	4
13	(United Kingdom) J Clarke	6	6
(Belarus) U Ignatik	3	4
(United Kingdom) J Choinski	6	6
LL	(Italy) F Arnaboldi	3	1

Third round
Alt	(Italy) A Vavassori	5	3
(Italy) R Marcora	7	6
13	(United Kingdom) J Clarke	5	6	1
(United Kingdom) J Choinski	7	1	6

Quarterfinals
(Italy) R Marcora	7^{7}	6
(United Kingdom) J Choinski	6^{3}	3
