= 2019 Trofeo Faip–Perrel – Doubles =

Perrel – Doubles
- 2019 Trofeo Faip–Perrel

Final
- Champions: (Lithuania) Laurynas Grigelis (Czech Republic) Zdeněk Kolář
- Runners-up: (Bosnia and Herzegovina) Tomislav Brkić (Germany) Dustin Brown
- Score: 7–5, 7–6^{(9–7)}

Events
Singles	Doubles
← 2018 ·	Trofeo Faip–Perrel	· 2020 →

Scott Clayton and Jonny O'Mara were the defending champions but only Clayton chose to defend his title, partnering Adil Shamasdin. Clayton lost in the semifinals to Laurynas Grigelis and Zdeněk Kolář.

Grigelis and Kolář won the title after defeating Tomislav Brkić and Dustin Brown 7–5, 7–6^{(9–7)} in the final.

== Seeds ==
1. (Netherlands) David Pel / (Croatia) Antonio Šančić (first round)
2. (Switzerland) Luca Margaroli / (Spain) David Vega Hernández (first round)
3. (United Kingdom) Scott Clayton / (Canada) Adil Shamasdin (semifinals)
4. (Italy) Julian Ocleppo / (Italy) Andrea Vavassori (quarterfinals)

== Draw ==
=== Key ===
- Q = Qualifier
- WC = Wild card
- LL = Lucky loser
- Alt = Alternate
- SE = Special exempt
- PR = Protected ranking
- ITF = ITF entry
- JE = Junior exempt
- w/o = Walkover
- r = Retired
- d = Defaulted
- SR = Special ranking

First round
1	(Netherlands) D Pel (Croatia) A Šančić	3	6	[4]
(Lithuania) L Grigelis (Czech Republic) Z Kolář	6	3	[10]
3	(United Kingdom) S Clayton (Canada) A Shamasdin	2	6	[10]
WC	(Italy) W Trusendi (Italy) M Viola	6	3	[8]
(Poland) T Bednarek (Egypt) M Safwat	2	5
(Croatia) T Draganja (Sweden) A Siljeström	6	7
Alt	(Poland) K Drzewiecki (Poland) S Walków	2	4
(Bosnia and Herzegovina) T Brkić (Germany) D Brown	6	6
ITF	(Guatemala) W González (Germany) Peter Heller	2	3
4	(Italy) J Ocleppo (Italy) A Vavassori	6	6
WC	(Italy) L Musetti (Italy) G Zeppieri	6^{2}	6	[5]
ITF	(Spain) S Martos Gornés (France) Hugo Voljacques	7^{7}	4	[10]
(Serbia) N Čačić (Netherlands) M Vervoort	6	7^{7}
2	(Switzerland) L Margaroli (Spain) D Vega Hernández	4	6^{4}

Quarterfinals
(Lithuania) L Grigelis (Czech Republic) Z Kolář	6	6
WC	(Italy) L Caruana (Italy) J Sinner	3	3
3	(United Kingdom) S Clayton (Canada) A Shamasdin	6	6
(Croatia) T Draganja (Sweden) A Siljeström	4	4
(Bosnia and Herzegovina) T Brkić (Germany) D Brown	6^{1}	7	[10]
4	(Italy) J Ocleppo (Italy) A Vavassori	7^{7}	5	[3]
ITF	(Spain) S Martos Gornés (France) H Voljacques	6	5	[7]
(Serbia) N Čačić (Netherlands) M Vervoort	4	7	[10]

Semifinals
(Lithuania) L Grigelis (Czech Republic) Z Kolář	6	6
3	(United Kingdom) S Clayton (Canada) A Shamasdin	4	1
(Bosnia and Herzegovina) T Brkić (Germany) D Brown	6	7^{7}
(Serbia) N Čačić (Netherlands) M Vervoort	3	6^{2}

Final
(Lithuania) L Grigelis (Czech Republic) Z Kolář	7	7^{9}
(Bosnia and Herzegovina) T Brkić (Germany) D Brown	5	6^{7}
