= 2016 Trofeo Faip–Perrel – Doubles =

Perrel – Doubles
- 2016 Trofeo Faip–Perrel

Final
- Champions: (United Kingdom) Ken Skupski (United Kingdom) Neal Skupski
- Runners-up: (Croatia) Nikola Mektić (Croatia) Antonio Šančić
- Score: 6–3 , 7–5

Events
| Singles | Doubles |
| ← 2015 · | Trofeo Faip–Perrel | · 2017 → |

Martin Emmrich and Andreas Siljeström are the defending champions, but Emmrich chose not to participate and Siljeström chose to partner with Mateusz Kowalczyk. Siljeström and Kowalczyk lost in the semifinals to Ken Skupski and Neal Skupski.

Ken Skupski and Neal Skupski went on to win the title, defeating Nikola Mektić and Antonio Šančić in the final 6–3, 7–5.

== Seeds ==
1. (Germany) Dustin Brown / (Australia) Rameez Junaid (quarterfinals)
2. (Poland) Mateusz Kowalczyk / (Sweden) Andreas Siljeström (semifinals)
3. (United Kingdom) Ken Skupski / (United Kingdom) Neal Skupski (champions)
4. (Croatia) Nikola Mektić / (Croatia) Antonio Šančić (final)

== Draw ==
=== Key ===
- Q = Qualifier
- WC = Wild card
- LL = Lucky loser
- Alt = Alternate
- SE = Special exempt
- PR = Protected ranking
- ITF = ITF entry
- JE = Junior exempt
- w/o = Walkover
- r = Retired
- d = Defaulted
- SR = Special ranking

First round
1 | (Germany) D Brown (Australia) R Junaid | 6 | 6
(United States) M Seeberger (Netherlands) M Vervoort | 3 | 2
(Bosnia and Herzegovina) M Bašić (Hungary) M Fucsovics | 6^{2} | 6 | [10]
PR | (Sweden) J Brunström (Slovakia) M Mertiňák | 7^{7} | 4 | [8]
4 | (Croatia) N Mektić (Croatia) A Šančić | 7^{7} | 6
(Croatia) D Marcan (Austria) M Neuchrist | 6^{4} | 3
(France) Q Halys (France) T Lamasine | 4 | 2
(Serbia) I Bozoljac (Netherlands) I Sijsling | 6 | 6
(Czech Republic) F Čermák (Russia) K Kravchuk | 4 | 4
WC | (Italy) S Caruso (Italy) F Gaio | 6 | 6
WC | (Uzbekistan) F Dustov (Italy) A Motti | 1 | 1
3 | (United Kingdom) K Skupski (United Kingdom) N Skupski | 6 | 6
(Italy) A Arnaboldi (Italy) F Cipolla | 6^{4} | 6 | [10]
(Russia) A Kudryavtsev (Japan) G Soeda | 7^{7} | 3 | [6]
WC | (Italy) W Trusendi (Italy) Matteo Volante | 4 | 2
2 | (Poland) M Kowalczyk (Sweden) A Siljeström | 6 | 6

Quarterfinals
1 | (Germany) D Brown (Australia) R Junaid | 5 | 4
(Bosnia and Herzegovina) M Bašić (Hungary) M Fucsovics | 7 | 6
4 | (Croatia) N Mektić (Croatia) A Šančić | 6 | 6
(Serbia) I Bozoljac (Netherlands) I Sijsling | 3 | 4
WC | (Italy) S Caruso (Italy) F Gaio | 7^{7} | 6^{3} | [7]
3 | (United Kingdom) K Skupski (United Kingdom) N Skupski | 6^{3} | 7^{7} | [10]
(Italy) A Arnaboldi (Italy) F Cipolla | 6 | 6^{5} | [5]
2 | (Poland) M Kowalczyk (Sweden) A Siljeström | 4 | 7^{7} | [10]

Semifinals
(Bosnia and Herzegovina) M Bašić (Hungary) M Fucsovics | 2 | 4
4 | (Croatia) N Mektić (Croatia) A Šančić | 6 | 6
3 | (United Kingdom) K Skupski (United Kingdom) N Skupski | 6 | 6^{5} | [10]
2 | (Poland) M Kowalczyk (Sweden) A Siljeström | 1 | 7^{7} | [7]

Final
4 | (Croatia) N Mektić (Croatia) A Šančić | 3 | 5
3 | (United Kingdom) K Skupski (United Kingdom) N Skupski | 6 | 7
