= Jack Draper career statistics =

Career finals
Discipline	Type	Won	Lost	Total	WR
Singles
Singles	Grand Slam	–	–	–	–
Singles	ATP Finals	–	–	–	–
Singles	ATP 1000	1	1	2	0.5
Singles	ATP 500	1	1	2	0.5
Singles	ATP 250	1	2	3	0.33
Singles	Olympics	–	–	–	–
Singles	Total	3	4	7	0.42
Doubles
Doubles	Grand Slam	–	–	–	–
Doubles	ATP Finals	–	–	–	–
Doubles	ATP 1000	–	–	–	–
Doubles	ATP 500	–	–	–	–
Doubles	ATP 250	–	–	–	–
Doubles	Olympics	–	–	–	–
Doubles	Total	–	–	–	–

This is a list of main career statistics of British professional tennis player Jack Draper.

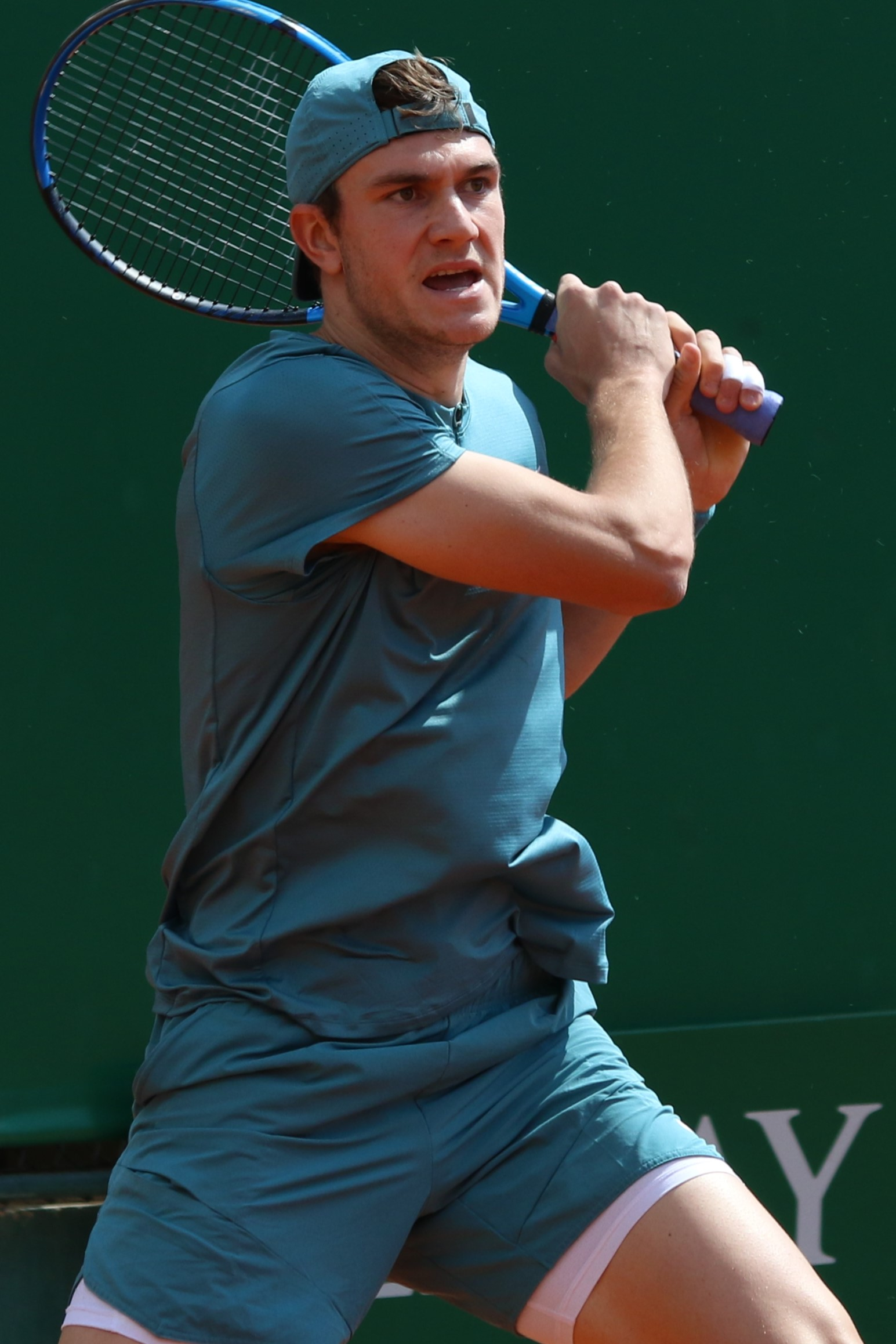
Draper at the 2023 Monte-Carlo Masters

== Performance timeline ==
Key
W	F	SF	QF	#R	RR	Q#	DNQ	A	NH

(W) winner; (F) finalist; (SF) semifinalist; (QF) quarterfinalist; (#R) rounds 4, 3, 2, 1; (RR) round-robin stage; (Q#) qualification round; (DNQ) did not qualify; (A) absent; (NH) not held; (SR) strike rate (events won / competed); (W–L) win–loss record.
To avoid confusion and double counting, these charts are updated at the conclusion of a tournament or when the player's participation has ended.

Current through the 2026 US Open.

Tournament	2018	2019	2020	2021	2022	2023	2024	2025	2026	SR	W–L	Win %
Grand Slam tournaments
Australian Open	A	A	A	A	A	1R	2R	4R	A	0 / 3	4–3	57%
French Open	A	A	A	A	A	1R	1R	4R	A	0 / 3	3–3	50%
Wimbledon	Q1	Q1	NH	1R	2R	A	2R	2R	A	0 / 4	3–4	43%
US Open	A	A	A	A	3R	4R	SF	2R (Note: Draper withdrew before the second round of the 2025 US Open, which does not officially count as a loss.)	A	0 / 4	11–3	79%
Win–loss	0–0	0–0	0–0	0–1	3–2	3–3	7–4	8–3	0–0	0 / 14	21–13	62%
Year-end championships
ATP Finals	did not qualify									0 / 0	0–0	–
National representation
Summer Olympics	NH			A	NH		2R	NH		0 / 1	1–1	50%
Davis Cup	A	A	NH	A	A	QF	RR	A		0 / 3	2–3	40%
ATP 1000 tournaments
Indian Wells Open	A	A	NH	A	A	4R	1R	W	QF	1 / 4	12–3	80%
Miami Open	A	A	NH	1R	2R	A	2R	2R	2R	0 / 5	2–5	29%
Monte-Carlo Masters	A	A	NH	A	A	2R	1R	3R	A	0 / 3	2–3	40%
Madrid Open	A	A	NH	A	2R	A	2R	F	A	0 / 3	7–3	70%
Italian Open	A	A	A	A	A	A	2R	QF	A	0 / 2	4–2	67%
Canadian Open	A	A	NH	A	QF	A	1R	A	1R	0 / 3	3–3	50%
Cincinnati Open	A	A	A	A	A	A	QF	A	1R	0 / 2	3–2	60%
Shanghai Masters	A	A	NH			A	A	A	A	0 / 0	0–0	–
Paris Masters	A	A	A	A	2R	A	3R	A	A	0 / 2	3–2	60%
Win–loss	0–0	0–0	0–0	0–1	6–4	4–2	8–8	15–4	3–4	1 / 24	36–23	61%
Career statistics
	2018	2019	2020	2021	2022	2023	2024	2025	2026	SR	W–L	Win %
Tournaments	0	0	0	3	13	11	22	11	7	Career total: 67		
Titles	0	0	0	0	0	0	2	1	0	Career total: 3		
Finals	0	0	0	0	0	1	3	3	0	Career total: 7		
Hard win–loss	0–0	0–0	0–0	0–1	13–10	16–9	26–13	14–3	5–5	2 / 40	74–41	64%
Clay win–loss	0–0	0–0	0–0	0–0	1–1	3–3	5–7	12–4	0–1	0 / 16	21–16	57%
Grass win–loss	0–0	0–0	0–0	2–2	5–3	0–0	8–2	4–2	3–1	1 / 11	22–10	69%
Overall win–loss	0–0	0–0	0–0	2–3	19–14	19–12	39–22	30–9	8–7	3 / 67	117–67	64%
Win %	–	–	–	40%	58%	61%	64%	77%	53%	Career total: 64%		
Year-end ranking	561	338	303	265	42	61	15	10		$8,990,836		

== ATP 1000 tournaments ==
=== Singles: 2 (1 title, 1 runner-up) ===
Result	Year	Tournament	Surface	Opponent	Score
Win	2025	Indian Wells Open	Hard	(Denmark) Holger Rune	6–2, 6–2
Loss	2025	Madrid Open	Clay	(Norway) Casper Ruud	5–7, 6–3, 4–6

== ATP Tour finals ==
=== Singles: 7 (3 titles, 4 runner-ups) ===
Legend Grand Slam (0–0) ATP Finals (0–0) ATP 1000 (1–1) ATP 500 (1–1) ATP 250 (1–2)	Finals by surface Hard (2–3) Clay (0–1) Grass (1–0)	Finals by setting Outdoor (2–3) Indoor (1–1)

Result	W–L	Date	Tournament	Tier	Surface	Opponent	Score
Loss	0–1	Nov 2023	Sofia Open, Bulgaria	ATP 250	Hard (i)	(France) Adrian Mannarino	6–7^{(6–8)}, 6–2, 3–6
Loss	0–2	Jan 2024	Adelaide International, Australia	ATP 250	Hard	(Czech Republic) Jiří Lehečka	6–4, 4–6, 3–6
Win	1–2	Jun 2024	Stuttgart Open, Germany	ATP 250	Grass	(Italy) Matteo Berrettini	3–6, 7–6^{(7–5)}, 6–4
Win	2–2	Oct 2024	Vienna Open, Austria	ATP 500	Hard (i)	Karen Khachanov	6–4, 7–5
Loss	2–3	Feb 2025	Qatar Open, Qatar	ATP 500	Hard	Andrey Rublev	5–7, 7–5, 1–6
Win	3–3	Mar 2025	Indian Wells Open, United States	ATP 1000	Hard	(Denmark) Holger Rune	6–2, 6–2
Loss	3–4	Apr 2025	Madrid Open, Spain	ATP 1000	Clay	(Norway) Casper Ruud	5–7, 6–3, 4–6

== ATP Challenger Tour finals ==
=== Singles: 6 (5 titles, 1 runner-up) ===
Legend ATP Challenger Tour (5–1)	Finals by surface Hard (5–1) Clay (0–0)

Result	W–L	Date	Tournament	Tier	Surface	Opponent	Score
Win	1–0	Jan 2022	Forlì II Challenger, Italy	Challenger	Hard (i)	(United Kingdom) Jay Clarke	6–3, 6–0
Win	2–0	Feb 2022	Forlì IV Challenger, Italy	Challenger	Hard (i)	(Netherlands) Tim van Rijthoven	6–1, 6–2
Win	3–0	Feb 2022	Forlì V Challenger, Italy	Challenger	Hard (i)	(United States) Alexander Ritschard	3–6, 6–3, 7–6^{(10–8)}
Win	4–0	Apr 2022	Harmonie Open, France	Challenger	Hard (i)	(Belgium) Zizou Bergs	6–2, 5–7, 6–4
Loss	4–1	Oct 2023	Orléans Open, France	Challenger	Hard (i)	(Czech Republic) Tomáš Macháč	4–6, 6–4, 3–6
Win	5–1	Nov 2023	Faip–Perrel Trophy, Italy	Challenger	Hard (i)	(Belgium) David Goffin	1–6, 7–6^{(7–3)}, 6–3

== ITF Futures/World Tennis Tour finals ==
=== Singles: 10 (7 titles, 3 runner–ups) ===
Legend ITF Futures/WTT (7–3)	Finals by surface Hard (7–2) Clay (0–1)

Result	W–L	Date	Tournament	Tier	Surface	Opponent	Score
Win	1–0	Sep 2018	F4 Nottingham, UK	Futures	Hard	(United Kingdom) Andrew Watson	3–6, 7–6^{(7–3)}, 6–0
Win	2–0	Sep 2018	F5 Roehampton, UK	Futures	Hard	(Sweden) Filip Bergevi	6–3, 6–2
Win	3–0	Oct 2018	F5 Lagos, Nigeria	Futures	Hard	(France) Tom Jomby	1–6, 6–3, 6–4
Win	4–0	Jul 2019	M25 Roehampton, United Kingdom	WTT	Hard	(Israel) Daniel Cukierman	4–6, 6–3, 6–2
Win	5–0	Aug 2019	M25 Chiswick, United Kingdom	WTT	Hard	(Netherlands) Igor Sijsling	6–4, 2–6, 6–3
Loss	5–1	Aug 2019	M15 Kiryat Shmona, Israel	WTT	Hard	(Israel) Yshai Oliel	3–6, 7–5, 4–6
Win	6–1	Sep 2019	M25 Shrewsbury, United Kingdom	WTT	Hard (i)	(Italy) Julian Ocleppo	6–4, 6–0
Loss	6–2	Feb 2020	M25 Glasgow, United Kingdom	WTT	Hard (i)	(France) Lucas Poullain	6–0, 5–7, 3–6
Win	7–2	Feb 2020	M25 Sunderland, United Kingdom	WTT	Hard (i)	(Netherlands) Igor Sijsling	6–2, 6–0
Loss	7–3	May 2021	M25 Prague, Czech Republic	WTT	Clay	(France) Manuel Guinard	4–6, 3–6

=== Doubles: 2 (1 title, 1 runner–up) ===
Legend ITF WTT (1–1)

Result	W–L	Date	Tournament	Tier	Surface	Partner	Opponents	Score
Win	1–0	Jul 2019	M15 Cancún, Mexico	WTT	Hard	(Colombia) Nicolás Mejía	(United States) Aron Pierce (United States) Noah Schachter	4–6, 7–6^{(7–2)}, [10–5]
Loss	1–1	Jul 2019	M15 Kiryat Shmona, Israel	WTT	Hard	(United Kingdom) Aidan McHugh	(United States) Samuel Beren (Canada) Raheel Manji	4–6, 6–2, [6–10]

== Junior Grand Slam finals ==
=== Singles: 1 (1 runner-up) ===
Result	Year	Tournament	Surface	Opponent	Score
Loss	2018	Wimbledon	Grass	(Chinese Taipei) Tseng Chun-hsin	1–6, 7–6^{(7–2)}, 4–6

== Career Grand Slam tournament statistics ==
=== Career Grand Slam tournament seedings ===
Year	Australian Open	French Open	Wimbledon	US Open
2018	did not play	did not play	did not qualify	did not play
2019	did not play	did not play	did not qualify	did not play
2020	did not play	did not play	tournament cancelled*	did not play
2021	did not play	did not play	wild card	did not play
2022	did not play	did not play	unseeded	unseeded
2023	unseeded	unseeded	did not play	unseeded
2024	unseeded	unseeded	28th	25th
2025	15th	5th	4th	5th
2026	did not play	did not play	did not play	did not play

* Due to the COVID-19 pandemic, the 2020 Wimbledon Championships of the tournament was cancelled.

=== Best Grand Slam results details ===
Australian Open
2025 Australian Open (15th seed)
Round	Opponent	Rank	Score
1R	(Argentina) Mariano Navone	47	4–6, 6–3, 3–6, 6–3, 6–2
2R	(Australia) Thanasi Kokkinakis	71	6–7^{(3–7)}, 6–3, 3–6, 7–5, 6–3
3R	(Australia) Aleksandar Vukic	68	6–4, 2–6, 5–7, 7–6^{(7–5)}, 7–6^{(10–8)}
4R	(Spain) Carlos Alcaraz (3)	3	5–7, 1–6, 0–0 ret.

French Open
2025 French Open (5th seed)
Round	Opponent	Rank	Score
1R	(Italy) Mattia Bellucci	68	3–6, 6–1, 6–4, 6–2
2R	(France) Gaël Monfils	42	6–3, 4–6, 6–3, 7–5
3R	(Brazil) João Fonseca	65	6–2, 6–4, 6–2
4R	(Kazakhstan) Alexander Bublik	62	7–5, 3–6, 2–6, 4–6

Wimbledon Championships
2022 Wimbledon (unseeded)
Round	Opponent	Rank	Score
1R	(Belgium) Zizou Bergs (WC)	146	6–4, 6–4, 7–6^{(7–4)}
2R	(Australia) Alex de Minaur (19)	27	7–5, 6–7^{(0–7)}, 2–6, 3–6
2024 Wimbledon (28th seed)
Round	Opponent	Rank	Score
1R	(Sweden) Elias Ymer (Q)	205	3–6, 6–3, 6–3, 4–6, 6–3
2R	(United Kingdom) Cameron Norrie	42	6–7^{(3–7)}, 4–6, 6–7^{(6–8)}
2025 Wimbledon (4th seed)
Round	Opponent	Rank	Score
1R	(Argentina) Sebastián Báez	38	6–2, 6–2, 2–1 ret.
2R	(Croatia) Marin Čilić	83	4–6, 3–6, 6–1, 4–6

US Open
2024 US Open (25th seed)
Round	Opponent	Rank	Score
1R	(China) Zhang Zhizhen	41	6–3, 6–0, 4–0 ret.
2R	(Argentina) Facundo Díaz Acosta	64	6–4, 6–2, 6–2
3R	(Netherlands) Botic van de Zandschulp	74	6–3, 6–4, 6–2
4R	(Czech Republic) Tomáš Macháč	39	6–3, 6–1, 6–2
QF	(Australia) Alex de Minaur (8)	10	6–3, 7–5, 6–2
SF	(Italy) Jannik Sinner (1)	1	5–7, 6–7^{(3–7)}, 2–6

== Wins against top 10 players ==
- Draper has a 9–16 record against players who were, at the time the match was played, ranked in the top 10.

Season	2022	2023	2024	2025	2026	Total
Wins	2	0	4	2	1	9

#	Opponent	Rk	Event	Surface	Rd	Score	Rk	Ref
2022
1.	(Greece) Stefanos Tsitsipas	5	Canadian Open, Canada	Hard	2R	7–5, 7–6^{(7–4)}	82	
2.	(Canada) Félix Auger-Aliassime	8	US Open, United States	Hard	2R	6–4, 6–4, 6–4	53	
2024
3.	(Spain) Carlos Alcaraz	2	Queen's Club, United Kingdom	Grass	2R	7–6^{(7–3)}, 6–3	31	
4.	(Australia) Alex de Minaur	10	US Open, United States	Hard	QF	6–3, 7–5, 6–2	25	
5.	(Poland) Hubert Hurkacz	8	Japan Open, Japan	Hard	2R	6–4, 6–4	20	
6.	(United States) Taylor Fritz	6	Paris Masters, France	Hard (i)	2R	7–6^{(8–6)}, 4–6, 6–4	15	
2025
7.	(United States) Taylor Fritz	4	Indian Wells Open, United States	Hard	4R	7–5, 6–4	14	
8.	(Spain) Carlos Alcaraz	3	Indian Wells Open, United States	Hard	SF	6–1, 0–6, 6–4	14	
2026
9.	(Serbia) Novak Djokovic	3	Indian Wells Open, United States	Hard	4R	4–6, 6–4, 7–6^{(7–5)}	14	

- Key: (Rk) first use, opponent rank; (Rd) round; (Rk) 2nd use, player rank; (Ref) reference; (F) final; (SF) semifinal; (QF) quarterfinal; (#R) rounds 4, 3, 2, 1; (RR) round-robin stage; (Q#) qualifying rounds or stages (3), 2, 1.

== Exhibition matches ==
Result	Date	Tournament	Surface	Opponent	Score
Win	Dec 2023	Ultimate Tennis Showdown Finals, London, United Kingdom	Hard (i)	(Denmark) Holger Rune	12–14, 15–12, 13–10, 19–7
