= 2023 Trofeo Faip–Perrel – Singles =

Perrel – Singles
- 2023 Trofeo Faip–Perrel

Final
- Champion: (United Kingdom) Jack Draper
- Runner-up: (Belgium) David Goffin
- Score: 1–6, 7–6^{(7–3)}, 6–3

Events
Singles	Doubles
← 2022 ·	Trofeo Faip–Perrel	· 2025 →

Otto Virtanen was the defending champion but chose not to defend his title.

Jack Draper won the title after defeating David Goffin 1–6, 7–6^{(7–3)}, 6–3 in the final.

== Seeds ==
1. (United Kingdom) Jack Draper (champion)
2. (Italy) Flavio Cobolli (first round)
3. (United Kingdom) Liam Broady (second round)
4. (Slovakia) Alex Molčan (quarterfinals)
5. (Belgium) David Goffin (final)
6. (Italy) Giulio Zeppieri (withdrew)
7. (Moldova) Radu Albot (second round)
8. (Italy) Fabio Fognini (quarterfinals)

== Draw ==
Key

- Q = Qualifier
- WC = Wild card
- LL = Lucky loser
- Alt = Alternate
- ITF = ITF entry
- PR = Protected ranking
- SR = Special ranking
- SE = Special exempt
- JE = Junior exempt
- JR = Junior Accelerator Programme entrant
- CO = College Accelerator Programme entrant
- NG = Next Gen Accelerator Program entrant
- w/o = Walkover
- r = Retired
- d = Defaulted

=== Finals ===
Semifinals
1	(United Kingdom) Jack Draper	6	3	7
(United States) Brandon Nakashima	1	6	5
5	(Belgium) David Goffin	6^{4}	6	6
LL	(Estonia) Mark Lajal	7^{7}	3	4

Final
1	(United Kingdom) Jack Draper	1	7^{7}	6
5	(Belgium) David Goffin	6	6^{3}	3

=== Top half ===
First round
1	(United Kingdom) J Draper	6	6
Alt	(Italy) F Maestrelli	4	4
(Italy) S Travaglia	4	2
(Italy) A Vavassori	6	6
(France) C Hemery	6^{7}	6	3
Q	(United Kingdom) B Harris	7^{9}	2	6
(Belgium) G Onclin	7^{8}	0	0
7	(Moldova) R Albot	6^{6}	6	6
3	(United Kingdom) L Broady	6	7^{7}
(United Kingdom) A Fery	3	6^{4}
Q	(Kazakhstan) M Kukushkin	1	4
(United States) B Nakashima	6	6
(Belgium) G-A Bailly	2	4
(France) H Grenier	6	6
Q	(France) M Martineau	3	4
8/WC	(Italy) F Fognini	6	6

Second round
1	(United Kingdom) J Draper	6	6
(Italy) A Vavassori	3	4
Q	(United Kingdom) B Harris	1	6	6
7	(Moldova) R Albot	6	3	4
3	(United Kingdom) L Broady	4	0
(United States) B Nakashima	6	6
(France) H Grenier	7^{7}	2	6^{5}
8/WC	(Italy) F Fognini	6^{2}	6	7^{7}

Quarterfinals
1	(United Kingdom) J Draper	6	6
Q	(United Kingdom) B Harris	2	3
(United States) B Nakashima	6	7
8/WC	(Italy) F Fognini	1	5

Semifinals
1	(United Kingdom) J Draper	6	3	7
(United States) B Nakashima	1	6	5

=== Bottom half ===
First round
5	(Belgium) D Goffin	6	7^{7}
WC	(Italy) Samuel Vincent Ruggeri	4	6^{4}
(Italy) F Passaro	7^{7}	6
(United States) N Moreno de Alboran	6^{3}	3
(Netherlands) G Brouwer	6	7
(Italy) F Gaio	3	5
(Italy) M Gigante	2	2
4	(Slovakia) A Molčan	6	6
LL	(Estonia) M Lajal	6	6
Q	(Netherlands) J Sels	3	2
LL	(France) U Blanchet	7^{7}	2	7
(Switzerland) L Riedi	6^{5}	6	5
Alt	(Turkey) C İlkel	6^{3}	6	7
Q	(Ukraine) I Marchenko	7^{7}	4	5
Q	(France) P-H Herbert	7^{7}	6
2/WC	(Italy) F Cobolli	6^{5}	3

Second round
5	(Belgium) D Goffin	6	7
(Italy) F Passaro	3	5
(Netherlands) G Brouwer	6	6^{3}	6^{3}
4	(Slovakia) A Molčan	3	7^{7}	7^{7}
LL	(Estonia) M Lajal	6	6^{4}	6
LL	(France) U Blanchet	2	7^{7}	2
Alt	(Turkey) C İlkel	1	1
Q	(France) P-H Herbert	6	6

Quarterfinals
5	(Belgium) D Goffin	7	6
4	(Slovakia) A Molčan	5	2
LL	(Estonia) M Lajal	6^{5}	6	6
Q	(France) P-H Herbert	7^{7}	4	4

Semifinals
5	(Belgium) D Goffin	6^{4}	6	6
LL	(Estonia) M Lajal	7^{7}	3	4
