= 2016 Trofeo Faip–Perrel – Singles =

Tennis contest held in Bergamo

Perrel – Singles
- 2016 Trofeo Faip–Perrel

Final
- Champion: (France) Pierre-Hugues Herbert
- Runner-up: (Belarus) Egor Gerasimov
- Score: 6–3, 7–6^{(7–5)}

Events
Singles	Doubles
← 2015 ·	Trofeo Faip–Perrel	· 2017 →

Benoît Paire is the defending champion, but chose to participate in the 2016 ABN AMRO World Tennis Tournament instead.

Pierre-Hugues Herbert won the title, defeating Egor Gerasimov in the final 6–3, 7–6^{(7–5)}.

== Seeds ==
1. (India) Yuki Bhambri (first round)
2. (Belgium) Ruben Bemelmans (first round)
3. (Georgia (country)) Nikoloz Basilashvili (first round)
4. (Bosnia and Herzegovina) Mirza Bašić (first round)
5. (Germany) Michael Berrer (quarterfinals)
6. (Japan) Go Soeda (second round)
7. (Germany) Dustin Brown (first round)
8. (Russia) Konstantin Kravchuk (first round)

== Draw ==
=== Key ===
- Q = Qualifier
- WC = Wild card
- LL = Lucky loser
- Alt = Alternate
- ITF = ITF entry
- PR = Protected ranking
- SR = Special ranking
- SE = Special exempt
- JE = Junior exempt
- JR = Junior Accelerator Programme entrant
- CO = College Accelerator Programme entrant
- NG = Next Gen Accelerator Program entrant
- w/o = Walkover
- r = Retired
- d = Defaulted

=== Finals ===
Semifinals
(France) Pierre-Hugues Herbert	6	6
Q	(France) Grégoire Barrère	4	4
(Belarus) Egor Gerasimov	6	6
(Japan) Hiroki Moriya	2	3

Final
(France) Pierre-Hugues Herbert	6	7^{7}
(Belarus) Egor Gerasimov	3	6^{5}

=== Top half ===
First round
1	(India) Y Bhambri	6	3	1
Alt	(Germany) P Gojowczyk	4	6	6
(Italy) A Arnaboldi	4	4
(Russia) A Kudryavtsev	6	6
(France) P-H Herbert	6	6
WC	(Italy) F Gaio	3	3
Q	(Germany) A Beck	4	6	4
6	(Japan) G Soeda	6	3	6
4	(Bosnia and Herzegovina) M Bašić	6	3	4
(Uzbekistan) F Dustov	4	6	6
Q	(Belarus) D Zhyrmont	6^{2}	7^{7}	6^{8}
Q	(France) G Barrère	7^{7}	6^{3}	7^{10}
LL	(Italy) S Caruso	1	6	6^{4}
Q	(Germany) N Langer	6	4	7^{7}
WC	(Czech Republic) R Štěpánek	6	3	3
5	(Germany) M Berrer	2	6	6

Second round
Alt	(Germany) P Gojowczyk	2	6	6
(Russia) A Kudryavtsev	6	3	3
(France) P-H Herbert	6	6
6	(Japan) G Soeda	4	3
(Uzbekistan) F Dustov	3	6	3
Q	(France) G Barrère	6	1	6
Q	(Germany) N Langer	7^{7}	6^{5}	5
5	(Germany) M Berrer	6^{2}	7^{7}	7

Quarterfinals
Alt	(Germany) P Gojowczyk	6	6^{3}	6^{4}
(France) P-H Herbert	3	7^{7}	7^{7}
Q	(France) G Barrère	6	6
5	(Germany) M Berrer	3	4

Semifinals
(France) P-H Herbert	6	6
Q	(France) G Barrère	4	4

=== Bottom half ===
First round
7	(Germany) D Brown	6	2	6^{4}
(Bosnia and Herzegovina) A Šetkić	2	6	7^{7}
(France) T Lamasine	7^{8}	4	7^{7}
(Sweden) E Ymer	6^{6}	6	6^{3}
WC	(Italy) G Mager	7^{7}	2	5
(Netherlands) I Sijsling	6^{5}	6	7
(Belarus) E Gerasimov	7	6
3	(Georgia (country)) N Basilashvili	5	3
8	(Russia) K Kravchuk	6^{5}	3
Alt	(Switzerland) M Chiudinelli	7^{7}	6
(France) Q Halys	6	7
(Australia) J Thompson	2	5
(Japan) H Moriya	6	6
LL	(Czech Republic) J Šátral	4	2
(Hungary) M Fucsovics	6	6
2/WC	(Belgium) R Bemelmans	3	4

Second round
(Bosnia and Herzegovina) A Šetkić	6	3	6
(France) T Lamasine	3	6	4
(Netherlands) I Sijsling	1	2
(Belarus) E Gerasimov	6	6
Alt	(Switzerland) M Chiudinelli	7^{7}	7
(France) Q Halys	6^{4}	5
(Japan) H Moriya	7^{8}	2	7
(Hungary) M Fucsovics	6^{6}	6	5

Quarterfinals
(Bosnia and Herzegovina) A Šetkić	4	4
(Belarus) E Gerasimov	6	6
Alt	(Switzerland) M Chiudinelli	4	4
(Japan) H Moriya	6	6

Semifinals
(Belarus) E Gerasimov	6	6
(Japan) H Moriya	2	3
