= 2025 Trofeo Faip–Perrel – Singles =

Perrel – Singles
- 2025 Trofeo Faip–Perrel

Final
- Champion: (Italy) Francesco Maestrelli
- Runner-up: (Germany) Marko Topo
- Score: 6–3, 3–6, 6–1

Events
Singles	Doubles
- Trofeo Faip–Perrel

Jack Draper was the defending champion but chose not to defend his title.

Francesco Maestrelli won the title after defeating Marko Topo 6–3, 3–6, 6–1 in the final.

== Seeds ==
1. (Japan) Shintaro Mochizuki (first round)
2. (United Kingdom) Billy Harris (first round)
3. (Finland) Otto Virtanen (first round)
4. (Italy) Francesco Passaro (quarterfinals)
5. (United Kingdom) Jan Choinski (first round)
6. (Italy) Andrea Pellegrino (first round)
7. (Estonia) Mark Lajal (second round, withdrew)
8. (Italy) Francesco Maestrelli (champion)

== Draw ==
Key

- Q = Qualifier
- WC = Wild card
- LL = Lucky loser
- Alt = Alternate
- ITF = ITF entry
- PR = Protected ranking
- SR = Special ranking
- SE = Special exempt
- JE = Junior exempt
- JR = Junior Accelerator Programme entrant
- CO = College Accelerator Programme entrant
- NG = Next Gen Accelerator Program entrant
- w/o = Walkover
- r = Retired
- d = Defaulted

=== Finals ===
Semifinals
(Italy) Stefano Travaglia	3	4
(Germany) Marko Topo	6	6
8	(Italy) Francesco Maestrelli	6	6
(Germany) Justin Engel	4	2

Final
(Germany) Marko Topo	3	6	1
8	(Italy) Francesco Maestrelli	6	3	6

=== Top half ===
First round
1	(Japan) S Mochizuki	6^{4}	6	2
LL	(Italy) F Arnaboldi	7^{7}	4	6
Alt	(Italy) Fabrizio Andaloro	4	6^{r}
(Bosnia and Herzegovina) N Fatić	6	6
(Italy) S Travaglia	6	3	7^{7}
(Croatia) M Dodig	3	6	6^{4}
Q	(Slovakia) M Karol	6	6
6	(Italy) A Pellegrino	4	2
4	(Italy) F Passaro	7^{8}	6
Q	(Italy) M Ribecai	6^{6}	2
WC	(Italy) Lorenzo Sciahbasi	3	7^{7}	7
(Norway) V Durasovic	6	6^{5}	5
Alt	(Switzerland) M Brunold	3	6	3
(Kazakhstan) B Zhukayev	6	1	6
(Germany) M Topo	7^{7}	6
5	(United Kingdom) J Choinski	6^{3}	4

Second round
LL	(Italy) F Arnaboldi	7	4	7
(Bosnia and Herzegovina) N Fatić	5	6	5
(Italy) S Travaglia	6	7
Q	(Slovakia) M Karol	4	5
4	(Italy) F Passaro	6	6
WC	(Italy) L Sciahbasi	2	3
(Kazakhstan) B Zhukayev	4	6^{4}
(Germany) M Topo	6	7^{7}

Quarterfinals
LL	(Italy) F Arnaboldi	3	3
(Italy) S Travaglia	6	6
4	(Italy) F Passaro	5	3
(Germany) M Topo	7	6

Semifinals
(Italy) S Travaglia	3	4
(Germany) M Topo	6	6

=== Bottom half ===
First round
8	(Italy) F Maestrelli	6	3	7^{7}
PR	(Finland) E Ruusuvuori	4	6	6^{3}
WC	(Italy) Pierluigi Basile	3	2
Q	(Belgium) B Gadamauri	6	6
LL	(Netherlands) N Visker	7^{7}	6
(Germany) T Gentzsch	6^{3}	4
PR	(Italy) S Napolitano	3	7^{8}	6
3	(Finland) O Virtanen	6	6^{6}	4
7	(Estonia) M Lajal	5	7	6
LL	A Vatutin	7	5	3
(Germany) J Engel	2
Q	(United Kingdom) H Stewart	1^{r}
Q	(Bulgaria) A Donski	4	6	6
WC	(Italy) Fausto Tabacco	6	3	4
Q	(Italy) A Guerrieri	6^{5}	7	6
2	(United Kingdom) B Harris	7^{7}	5	3

Second round
8	(Italy) F Maestrelli	6	6
Q	(Belgium) B Gadamauri	3	3
LL	(Netherlands) N Visker	4	4
PR	(Italy) S Napolitano	6	6
7	(Estonia) M Lajal
(Germany) J Engel	w/o
Q	(Bulgaria) A Donski	4	0
Q	(Italy) A Guerrieri	6	6

Quarterfinals
8	(Italy) F Maestrelli	6	7^{9}
PR	(Italy) S Napolitano	3	6^{7}
(Germany) J Engel	6	3	7^{7}
Q	(Italy) A Guerrieri	3	6	6^{4}

Semifinals
8	(Italy) F Maestrelli	6	6
(Germany) J Engel	4	2
