= 2021 Trofeo Faip–Perrel – Doubles =

Perrel – Doubles
- 2021 Trofeo Faip–Perrel

Final
- Champions: (Czech Republic) Zdeněk Kolář (Czech Republic) Jiří Lehečka
- Runners-up: (United Kingdom) Lloyd Glasspool (Finland) Harri Heliövaara
- Score: 6–4, 6–4

Events
Singles	Doubles
- Trofeo Faip–Perrel

Zdeněk Kolář and Julian Ocleppo were the defending champions but only Kolář chose to defend his title, partnering Jiří Lehečka.

Kolář successfully defended his title, defeating Lloyd Glasspool and Harri Heliövaara 6–4, 6–4 in the final.

== Seeds ==
1. (United Kingdom) Lloyd Glasspool / (Finland) Harri Heliövaara (final)
2. (Monaco) Romain Arneodo / (Ukraine) Sergiy Stakhovsky (quarterfinals)
3. (Moldova) Radu Albot / (New Zealand) Artem Sitak (semifinals)
4. (India) Sriram Balaji / (India) Divij Sharan (first round)

== Draw ==
Key

- Q = Qualifier
- WC = Wild card
- LL = Lucky loser
- Alt = Alternate
- ITF = ITF entry
- PR = Protected ranking
- SR = Special ranking
- SE = Special exempt
- JE = Junior exempt
- JR = Junior Accelerator Programme entrant
- CO = College Accelerator Programme entrant
- NG = Next Gen Accelerator Program entrant
- w/o = Walkover
- r = Retired
- d = Defaulted

First round
1	(United Kingdom) L Glasspool (Finland) H Heliövaara	6	7
WC	(Italy) Matteo Marfia (Italy) Augusto Virgili	3	5
(Russia) E Donskoy (Kazakhstan) M Kukushkin	6	7^{8}
(France) J Eysseric (France) A Olivetti	4	6^{6}
4	(India) S Balaji (India) D Sharan	6	6^{2}	[11]
(Italy) F Forti (Italy) F Gaio	4	7^{7}	[13]
(Netherlands) M Hermans (Poland) P Matuszewski	6	4	[8]
(Croatia) D Ajduković (Russia) P Kotov	3	6	[10]
(Bosnia and Herzegovina) D Džumhur (Bosnia and Herzegovina) N Fatić	7^{7}	6
(United Kingdom) E Hoyt (Switzerland) L Margaroli	6^{4}	2
WC	(India) A Chandrasekar (India) VS Prashanth	2	2
3	(Moldova) R Albot (New Zealand) A Sitak	6	6
(Czech Republic) Z Kolář (Czech Republic) J Lehečka	6	6
WC	(Italy) F Baldi (Italy) L Nardi	2	2
(United States) J Cerretani (Netherlands) G Smits	4	3
2	(Monaco) R Arneodo (Ukraine) S Stakhovsky	6	6

Quarterfinals
1	(United Kingdom) L Glasspool (Finland) H Heliövaara	7^{7}	6
(Russia) E Donskoy (Kazakhstan) M Kukushkin	6^{2}	4
(Italy) F Forti (Italy) F Gaio	6^{6}	7	[10]
(Croatia) D Ajduković (Russia) P Kotov	7^{8}	5	[6]
(Bosnia and Herzegovina) D Džumhur (Bosnia and Herzegovina) N Fatić	4	5
3	(Moldova) R Albot (New Zealand) A Sitak	6	7
(Czech Republic) Z Kolář (Czech Republic) J Lehečka	6	2	[10]
2	(Monaco) R Arneodo (Ukraine) S Stakhovsky	4	6	[6]

Semifinals
1	(United Kingdom) L Glasspool (Finland) H Heliövaara	3	6	[10]
(Italy) F Forti (Italy) F Gaio	6	4	[6]
3	(Moldova) R Albot (New Zealand) A Sitak	3	6	[6]
(Czech Republic) Z Kolář (Czech Republic) J Lehečka	6	2	[10]

Final
1	(United Kingdom) L Glasspool (Finland) H Heliövaara	4	4
(Czech Republic) Z Kolář (Czech Republic) J Lehečka	6	6
