= 2023 Trofeo Faip–Perrel – Doubles =

Perrel – Doubles
- 2023 Trofeo Faip–Perrel

Final
- Champions: (United States) Evan King (United States) Brandon Nakashima
- Runners-up: (Portugal) Francisco Cabral (United Kingdom) Henry Patten
- Score: 6–4, 7–6^{(7–1)}

Events
Singles	Doubles
- Trofeo Faip–Perrel

Henri Squire and Jan-Lennard Struff were the defending champions but chose not to defend their title.

Evan King and Brandon Nakashima won the title after defeating Francisco Cabral and Henry Patten 6–4, 7–6^{(7–1)} in the final.

== Seeds ==
1. (Portugal) Francisco Cabral / (United Kingdom) Henry Patten (final)
2. (Romania) Victor Vlad Cornea / (Netherlands) Bart Stevens (first round)
3. (France) Théo Arribagé / (France) Luca Sanchez (semifinals)
4. (Netherlands) Sander Arends / (Mexico) Miguel Ángel Reyes-Varela (semifinals)

== Draw ==
Key

- Q = Qualifier
- WC = Wild card
- LL = Lucky loser
- Alt = Alternate
- ITF = ITF entry
- PR = Protected ranking
- SR = Special ranking
- SE = Special exempt
- JE = Junior exempt
- JR = Junior Accelerator Programme entrant
- CO = College Accelerator Programme entrant
- NG = Next Gen Accelerator Program entrant
- w/o = Walkover
- r = Retired
- d = Defaulted

First round
1	(Portugal) F Cabral (United Kingdom) H Patten	7^{7}	6
(Australia) A Harris (United States) V Kirkov	6^{1}	4
(Turkey) S Ağabigün (Turkey) E Kırkın	4	4
(Italy) G Ricca (Italy) S Travaglia	6	6
4	(Netherlands) S Arends (Mexico) MÁ Reyes-Varela	6	3	[10]
(Uzbekistan) D Istomin; I Liutarevich	3	6	[4]
(Italy) M Bortolotti (Italy) F Gaio	6	2	[8]
(Israel) D Cukierman (United Kingdom) J Paris	4	6	[10]
WC	(Italy) F Cobolli (Italy) F Fognini	6	6
Alt	(Italy) A Vavassori (Italy) Matteo Vavassori	4	4
(Romania) A Jecan (Ukraine) V Uzhylovskyi	1	6^{3}
3	(France) T Arribagé (France) L Sanchez	6	7^{7}
(New Zealand) F Reynolds (Israel) R Stepanov	5	3
(Netherlands) G Brouwer (Netherlands) M Hermans	7	6
(United States) E King (United States) B Nakashima	6	7
2	(Romania) VV Cornea (Netherlands) B Stevens	1	5

Quarterfinals
1	(Portugal) F Cabral (United Kingdom) H Patten	4	6	[10]
(Italy) G Ricca (Italy) S Travaglia	6	3	[5]
4	(Netherlands) S Arends (Mexico) MÁ Reyes-Varela	6^{3}	6	[10]
(Israel) D Cukierman (United Kingdom) J Paris	7^{7}	4	[5]
WC	(Italy) F Cobolli (Italy) F Fognini
3	(France) T Arribagé (France) L Sanchez	w/o
(Netherlands) G Brouwer (Netherlands) M Hermans	3	4
(United States) E King (United States) B Nakashima	6	6

Semifinals
1	(Portugal) F Cabral (United Kingdom) H Patten	6	6^{5}	[10]
4	(Netherlands) S Arends (Mexico) MÁ Reyes-Varela	3	7^{7}	[5]
3	(France) T Arribagé (France) L Sanchez	6^{5}	6	[7]
(United States) E King (United States) B Nakashima	7^{7}	3	[10]

Final
1	(Portugal) F Cabral (United Kingdom) H Patten	4	6^{1}
(United States) E King (United States) B Nakashima	6	7^{7}
