= 2025 Trofeo Faip–Perrel – Doubles =

Perrel – Doubles
- 2025 Trofeo Faip–Perrel

Final
- Champions: (United Kingdom) Joshua Paris (United Kingdom) Marcus Willis
- Runners-up: (Czech Republic) David Poljak (Germany) Tim Rühl
- Score: 7–6^{(7–3)}, 6–4

Events
Singles	Doubles
- Trofeo Faip–Perrel

Evan King and Brandon Nakashima were the defending champions but chose not to defend their title.

Joshua Paris and Marcus Willis won the title after defeating David Poljak and Tim Rühl 7–6^{(7–3)}, 6–4 in the final.

== Seeds ==
1. (Germany) Jakob Schnaitter / (Germany) Mark Wallner (quarterfinals)
2. (France) Théo Arribagé / (France) Albano Olivetti (semifinals)
3. (United Kingdom) Joshua Paris / (United Kingdom) Marcus Willis (champions)
4. (Austria) David Pichler / (Poland) Filip Pieczonka (quarterfinals)

== Draw ==
Key

- Q = Qualifier
- WC = Wild card
- LL = Lucky loser
- Alt = Alternate
- ITF = ITF entry
- PR = Protected ranking
- SR = Special ranking
- SE = Special exempt
- JE = Junior exempt
- JR = Junior Accelerator Programme entrant
- CO = College Accelerator Programme entrant
- NG = Next Gen Accelerator Program entrant
- w/o = Walkover
- r = Retired
- d = Defaulted

First round
1	(Germany) J Schnaitter (Germany) M Wallner	7^{7}	6
(Bosnia and Herzegovina) N Fatić (Serbia) S Latinović	6^{3}	3
(Netherlands) J Jans (Netherlands) N Visker	7^{7}	4	[10]
(Slovakia) M Karol (Finland) P Niklas-Salminen	6^{3}	6	[5]
4	(Austria) D Pichler (Poland) F Pieczonka	6	6
A Vatutin (Kazakhstan) B Zhukayev	2	1
(Czech Republic) D Poljak (Germany) T Rühl	6	3	[10]
I Liutarevich (Italy) G Ricca	4	6	[6]
(Romania) V Cornea (Croatia) N Serdarušić	4	5
(Italy) F Maestrelli (Italy) S Travaglia	6	7
(Bulgaria) A Donski (Ukraine) D Molchanov	6^{4}	3
3	(United Kingdom) J Paris (United Kingdom) M Willis	7^{7}	6
WC	(Italy) Ad Virgili (Italy) Augusto Virgili	2	4
WC	(Italy) Juan Cruz Martin Manzano (Italy) M Ribecai	6	6
(Norway) V Durasovic (Norway) L Hellum-Lilleengen	3	3
2	(France) T Arribagé (France) A Olivetti	6	6

Quarterfinals
1	(Germany) J Schnaitter (Germany) M Wallner	5	6	[15]
(Netherlands) J Jans (Netherlands) N Visker	7	3	[17]
4	(Austria) D Pichler (Poland) F Pieczonka	5	4
(Czech Republic) D Poljak (Germany) T Rühl	7	6
(Italy) F Maestrelli (Italy) S Travaglia	6^{5}	4
3	(United Kingdom) J Paris (United Kingdom) M Willis	7^{7}	6
WC	(Italy) JC Martin Manzano (Italy) M Ribecai	2	6	[7]
2	(France) T Arribagé (France) A Olivetti	6	3	[10]

Semifinals
(Netherlands) J Jans (Netherlands) N Visker	4	7	[5]
(Czech Republic) D Poljak (Germany) T Rühl	6	5	[10]
3	(United Kingdom) J Paris (United Kingdom) M Willis	6	7
2	(France) T Arribagé (France) A Olivetti	1	5

Final
(Czech Republic) D Poljak (Germany) T Rühl	6^{3}	4
3	(United Kingdom) J Paris (United Kingdom) M Willis	7^{7}	6
