= 2023 Trofeo Faip–Perrel =

- Date: 30 October – 5 November
- Edition: 18th
- Surface: Hard (Indoor)
- Location: Bergamo, Italy

Champions

Singles
- (United Kingdom) Jack Draper

Doubles
- (United States) Evan King / (United States) Brandon Nakashima
| ← 2022 · | Trofeo Faip–Perrel | · 2025 → |

The 2023 Trofeo Faip–Perrel presented by Intesa Sanpaolo, was a professional tennis tournament played on hard courts. It was the 18th edition of the tournament which was part of the 2023 ATP Challenger Tour. It took place in Bergamo, Italy between 30 October and 5 November 2023.

== Singles main-draw entrants ==
=== Seeds ===
| Country | Player | Rank^{1} | Seed |
|---|---|---|---|
| GBR | Jack Draper | 91 | 1 |
| ITA | Flavio Cobolli | 95 | 2 |
| GBR | Liam Broady | 101 | 3 |
| SVK | Alex Molčan | 108 | 4 |
| BEL | David Goffin | 111 | 5 |
| ~~ITA~~ | ~~Giulio Zeppieri~~ | ~~128~~ | ~~6~~ |
| MDA | Radu Albot | 132 | 7 |
| ITA | Fabio Fognini | 134 | 8 |

- ^{1} Rankings were as of 23 October 2023.

=== Other entrants ===
The following players received wildcards into the singles main draw:

- (Italy) Flavio Cobolli
- (Italy) Fabio Fognini
- (Italy) Samuel Vincent Ruggeri

The following players received entry into the singles main draw as alternates:

- (Turkey) Cem İlkel
- (Italy) Francesco Maestrelli

The following players received entry from the qualifying draw:

- (United Kingdom) Billy Harris
- (France) Pierre-Hugues Herbert
- (Kazakhstan) Mikhail Kukushkin
- (Ukraine) Illya Marchenko
- (France) Matteo Martineau
- (Netherlands) Jelle Sels

The following players received entry as lucky losers:

- (France) Ugo Blanchet
- (Estonia) Mark Lajal

== Champions ==
=== Singles ===
- (United Kingdom) Jack Draper def. (Belgium) David Goffin 1–6, 7–6^{(7–3)}, 6–3.

=== Doubles ===
- (United States) Evan King / (United States) Brandon Nakashima def. (Portugal) Francisco Cabral / (United Kingdom) Henry Patten 6–4, 7–6^{(7–1)}.
