= 2022 Trofeo Faip–Perrel =

- Date: 31 October – 6 November
- Edition: 17th
- Surface: Hard (Indoor)
- Location: Bergamo, Italy

Champions

Singles
- (Finland) Otto Virtanen

Doubles
- (Germany) Henri Squire / (Germany) Jan-Lennard Struff
← 2021 ·	Trofeo Faip–Perrel	· 2023 →

The 2022 Trofeo Faip–Perrel was a professional tennis tournament played on hard courts. It was the seventeenth edition of the tournament which was part of the 2022 ATP Challenger Tour. It took place in Bergamo, Italy between 31 October and 6 November 2022.

== Singles main-draw entrants ==
=== Seeds ===
Country	Player	Rank^{1}	Seed
POL	Kamil Majchrzak	82	1
POR	Nuno Borges	95	2
CHN	Zhang Zhizhen	97	3
FRA	Grégoire Barrère	110	4
NED	Tim van Rijthoven	112	5
CZE	Tomáš Macháč	115	6
CHI	Nicolás Jarry	116	7
ESP	Fernando Verdasco	120	8

- ^{1} Rankings were as of 24 October 2022.

=== Other entrants ===
The following players received wildcards into the singles main draw:

- (Italy) Luca Nardi
- (Netherlands) Tim van Rijthoven
- (Italy) Giulio Zeppieri

The following player received entry into the singles main draw as a special exempt:

- (Croatia) Borna Gojo

The following player received entry into the singles main draw as an alternate:

- (Bulgaria) Dimitar Kuzmanov

The following players received entry from the qualifying draw:

- (Turkey) Altuğ Çelikbilek
- (Turkey) Cem İlkel
- Alibek Kachmazov
- Evgeny Karlovskiy
- (Italy) Andrea Vavassori
- (Finland) Otto Virtanen

== Champions ==
=== Singles ===
- (Finland) Otto Virtanen def. (Germany) Jan-Lennard Struff 6–2, 7–5.

=== Doubles ===
- (Germany) Henri Squire / (Germany) Jan-Lennard Struff def. (France) Jonathan Eysseric / (France) Albano Olivetti 6–4, 6–7^{(5–7)}, [10–7].
