= 2025 Trofeo Faip–Perrel =

- Date: 17 – 23 November
- Edition: 20th
- Surface: Hard (indoor)
- Location: Bergamo, Italy

Champions

Singles
- (Italy) Francesco Maestrelli

Doubles
- (United Kingdom) Joshua Paris / (United Kingdom) Marcus Willis
- Trofeo Faip–Perrel

The 2025 Trofeo Faip–Perrel was a professional tennis tournament played on hard courts. It was the 20th edition of the tournament which was part of the 2025 ATP Challenger Tour. It took place in Bergamo, Italy between 17 and 23 November 2025.

== Singles main-draw entrants ==
=== Seeds ===
Country	Player	Rank^{1}	Seed
JPN	Shintaro Mochizuki	92	1
GBR	Billy Harris	124	2
FIN	Otto Virtanen	126	3
ITA	Francesco Passaro	128	4
GBR	Jan Choinski	129	5
ITA	Andrea Pellegrino	140	6
EST	Mark Lajal	149	7
ITA	Francesco Maestrelli	158	8

- ^{1} Rankings were as of 10 November 2025.

=== Other entrants ===
The following players received wildcards into the singles main draw:

- (Italy) Pierluigi Basile
- (Italy) Lorenzo Sciahbasi
- (Italy) Fausto Tabacco

The following players received entry into the singles main draw using protected rankings:

- (Italy) Stefano Napolitano
- (Finland) Emil Ruusuvuori

The following players received entry into the singles main draw as alternates:

- (Italy) Fabrizio Andaloro
- (Switzerland) Mika Brunold

The following players received entry from the qualifying draw:

- (Bulgaria) Alexander Donski
- (Belgium) Buvaysar Gadamauri
- (Italy) Andrea Guerrieri
- (Slovakia) Miloš Karol
- (Italy) Michele Ribecai
- (United Kingdom) Hamish Stewart

The following players received entry as lucky losers:

- (Italy) Federico Arnaboldi
- Alexey Vatutin
- (Netherlands) Niels Visker

== Champions ==
=== Singles ===
- (Italy) Francesco Maestrelli def. (Germany) Marko Topo 6–3, 3–6, 6–1.

=== Doubles ===
- (United Kingdom) Joshua Paris / (United Kingdom) Marcus Willis def. (Czech Republic) David Poljak / (Germany) Tim Rühl 7–6^{(7–3)}, 6–4.
