= 2016 Trofeo Faip–Perrel =

Tennis tournament

- Date: 8–14 February
- Edition: 11th
- Draw: 32S / 16D
- Prize money: €42,500+H
- Surface: Hard
- Location: Bergamo, Italy

Champions

Singles
- (France) Pierre-Hugues Herbert

Doubles
- (United Kingdom) Ken Skupski / (United Kingdom) Neal Skupski
← 2015 ·	Trofeo Faip–Perrel	· 2017 →

The 2016 Trofeo Faip–Perrel was a professional tennis tournament played on hard courts. It was the eleventh edition of the tournament which was part of the 2016 ATP Challenger Tour. It took place in Bergamo, Italy between 8 and 14 February 2015.

== Singles main-draw entrants ==
=== Seeds ===
Country	Player	Rank^{1}	Seed
IND	Yuki Bhambri	100	1
BEL	Ruben Bemelmans	107	2
GEO	Nikoloz Basilashvili	116	3
BIH	Mirza Bašić	119	4
GER	Michael Berrer	121	5
JPN	Go Soeda	127	6
GER	Dustin Brown	133	7
RUS	Konstantin Kravchuk	135	8

- ^{1} Rankings were as of February 1, 2016.

=== Other entrants ===
The following players received wildcards into the singles main draw:

- (Belgium) Ruben Bemelmans
- (Italy) Federico Gaio
- (Italy) Gianluca Mager
- (Czech Republic) Radek Štěpánek

The following players received entry into the main draw as alternates:

- (Switzerland) Marco Chiudinelli
- (Germany) Peter Gojowczyk

The following players received entry into the main draw as a lucky loser:

- (Italy) Salvatore Caruso
- (Czech Republic) Jan Šátral

The following players received entry from the qualifying draw:

- (France) Grégoire Barrère
- (Germany) Andreas Beck
- (Germany) Nils Langer
- (Belarus) Dzmitry Zhyrmont

== Champions ==
=== Singles ===
- (France) Pierre-Hugues Herbert def. (Belarus) Egor Gerasimov, 6–3, 7–6^{(7–5)}

=== Doubles ===
- (United Kingdom) Ken Skupski / (United Kingdom) Neal Skupski def. (Croatia) Nikola Mektić / (Croatia) Antonio Šančić, 6–3, 7–5
