= 2020 Trofeo Faip–Perrel =

- Date: 17–23 February
- Edition: 15th
- Draw: 48S / 16D
- Surface: Hard
- Location: Bergamo, Italy

Champions

Singles
- no champion

Doubles
- (Czech Republic) Zdeněk Kolář / (Italy) Julian Ocleppo
← 2019 ·	Trofeo Faip–Perrel	· 2021 →

The 2020 Trofeo Faip–Perrel was a professional tennis tournament played on hard courts. It was the fifteenth edition of the tournament which was part of the 2020 ATP Challenger Tour. It took place in Bergamo, Italy between 17 and 23 February 2020.

== Singles main-draw entrants ==
=== Seeds ===
Country	Player	Rank^{1}	Seed
ITA	Lorenzo Giustino	156	1
ITA	Roberto Marcora	166	2
POR	Frederico Ferreira Silva	193	3
ARG	Marco Trungelliti	195	4
TUR	Cem İlkel	199	5
FRA	Constant Lestienne	202	6
FRA	Enzo Couacaud	208	7
JPN	Hiroki Moriya	211	8
ITA	Matteo Viola	214	9
FRA	Tristan Lamasine	217	10
CZE	Zdeněk Kolář	224	11
RUS	Roman Safiullin	231	12
SRB	Peđa Krstin	233	13
FRA	Mathias Bourgue	244	14
FRA	Hugo Gaston	248	15
ITA	Filippo Baldi	249	16

- ^{1} Rankings were as of 10 February 2020.

=== Other entrants ===
The following players received wildcards into the singles main draw:

- (Sweden) Leo Borg
- (Italy) Flavio Cobolli
- (Italy) Matteo Gigante
- (Italy) Francesco Maestrelli
- (Italy) Luca Nardi

The following players received entry from the qualifying draw:

- (France) Sadio Doumbia
- (Chinese Taipei) Tseng Chun-hsin

The following player received entry as a lucky loser:

- (Czech Republic) Pavel Nejedlý

== Champions ==
=== Singles ===
- (Ukraine) Illya Marchenko vs. (France) Enzo Couacaud canceled due to coronavirus.

=== Doubles ===
- (Czech Republic) Zdeněk Kolář / (Italy) Julian Ocleppo def. (Switzerland) Luca Margaroli / (Italy) Andrea Vavassori 6–4, 6–3.
