= 2019 Trofeo Faip–Perrel =

Tennis tournament

- Date: 18–24 February
- Edition: 14th
- Draw: 48S / 16D
- Surface: Hard
- Location: Bergamo, Italy

Champions

Singles
- (Italy) Jannik Sinner

Doubles
- (Lithuania) Laurynas Grigelis / (Czech Republic) Zdeněk Kolář
| ← 2018 · | Trofeo Faip–Perrel | · 2020 → |

The 2019 Trofeo Faip–Perrel was a professional tennis tournament played on hard courts. It was the fourteenth edition of the tournament which was part of the 2019 ATP Challenger Tour. It took place in Bergamo, Italy between 18 and 24 February 2019.

== Singles main-draw entrants ==
=== Seeds ===
| Country | Player | Rank^{1} | Seed |
|---|---|---|---|
| RUS | Evgeny Donskoy | 94 | 1 |
| ~~ITA~~ | ~~Stefano Travaglia~~ | ~~120~~ | ~~2~~ |
| KAZ | Alexander Bublik | 144 | 3 |
| ITA | Gianluigi Quinzi | 153 | 4 |
| ITA | Luca Vanni | 155 | 5 |
| FRA | Quentin Halys | 167 | 6 |
| ~~ITA~~ | ~~Filippo Baldi~~ | ~~169~~ | ~~7~~ |
| GER | Daniel Brands | 171 | 8 |
| ITA | Salvatore Caruso | 173 | 9 |
| ITA | Lorenzo Giustino | 185 | 10 |
| EGY | Mohamed Safwat | 192 | 11 |
| SVK | Filip Horanský | 193 | 12 |
| GBR | Jay Clarke | 196 | 13 |
| ITA | Stefano Napolitano | 198 | 14 |
| BEL | Arthur De Greef | 209 | 15 |
| NED | Tallon Griekspoor | 211 | 16 |

- ^{1} Rankings were as of 11 February 2019.

=== Other entrants ===
The following players received wildcards into the singles main draw:

- (Italy) Liam Caruana
- (Italy) Lorenzo Musetti
- (Italy) Julian Ocleppo
- (Italy) Jannik Sinner
- (Italy) Giulio Zeppieri

The following player received entry into the singles main draw as an alternate:

- (Italy) Andrea Vavassori

The following players received entry into the singles main draw using their ITF World Tennis Ranking:

- (Spain) Javier Barranco Cosano
- (Italy) Raúl Brancaccio
- (Germany) Peter Heller
- (Russia) Roman Safiullin

The following players received entry from the qualifying draw:

- (Italy) Riccardo Bonadio
- (France) Baptiste Crepatte

The following player received entry as a lucky loser:

- (Italy) Federico Arnaboldi

== Champions ==
=== Singles ===
- (Italy) Jannik Sinner def. (Italy) Roberto Marcora 6–3, 6–1.

=== Doubles ===
- (Lithuania) Laurynas Grigelis / (Czech Republic) Zdeněk Kolář def. (Bosnia and Herzegovina) Tomislav Brkić / (Germany) Dustin Brown 7–5, 7–6^{(9–7)}.
