= 2017 Trofeo Faip–Perrel =

Tennis tournament

- Date: 20–26 February
- Edition: 12th
- Draw: 32S / 16D
- Prize money: €42,500+H
- Surface: Hard
- Location: Bergamo, Italy

Champions

Singles
- (Poland) Jerzy Janowicz

Doubles
- (Austria) Julian Knowle / (Canada) Adil Shamasdin
← 2016 ·	Trofeo Faip–Perrel	· 2018 →

The 2017 Trofeo Faip–Perrel was the twelfth edition of a professional tennis tournament played on hard courts. It was part of the 2017 ATP Challenger Tour, and took place in Bergamo, Italy between 20 and 26 February 2016.

== Singles main-draw entrants ==
=== Seeds ===
Country	Player	Rank^{1}	Seed
ITA	Andreas Seppi	70	1
SVK	Lukáš Lacko	104	2
~~FRA~~	~~Pierre-Hugues Herbert~~	~~109~~	~~3~~
ITA	Luca Vanni	143	4
BLR	Uladzimir Ignatik	150	5
~~GER~~	~~Peter Gojowczyk~~	~~153~~	~~6~~
FRA	Quentin Halys	164	7
GER	Maximilian Marterer	171	8
ITA	Stefano Napolitano	172	9
BLR	Ilya Ivashka	177	10

- ^{1} Rankings were as of February 13, 2017.

=== Other entrants ===
The following players received wildcards into the singles main draw:

- (Italy) Andrea Arnaboldi
- (Italy) Matteo Berrettini
- (Poland) Jerzy Janowicz
- (Italy) Andreas Seppi

The following players received entry from the qualifying draw:

- (Germany) Matthias Bachinger
- (France) Rémi Boutillier
- (Belarus) Egor Gerasimov
- (Germany) Yannick Hanfmann

The following players received entry as lucky losers:

- (Italy) Alessandro Bega
- (Germany) Nils Langer

== Champions ==
=== Singles ===
- (Poland) Jerzy Janowicz def. (France) Quentin Halys 6–4, 6–4.

=== Doubles ===
- (Austria) Julian Knowle / (Canada) Adil Shamasdin def. (Croatia) Dino Marcan / (Austria) Tristan-Samuel Weissborn 6–3, 6–3.
