= 2018 Trofeo Faip–Perrel =

- Date: 19–25 February
- Edition: 13th
- Draw: 32S / 16D
- Surface: Hard
- Location: Bergamo, Italy

Champions

Singles
- (Italy) Matteo Berrettini

Doubles
- (United Kingdom) Scott Clayton / (United Kingdom) Jonny O'Mara
← 2017 ·	Trofeo Faip–Perrel	· 2019 →

The 2018 Trofeo Faip–Perrel was a professional tennis tournament played on hard courts. It was the thirteenth edition of the tournament which was part of the 2018 ATP Challenger Tour. It took place in Bergamo, Italy between 19 and 25 February 2018.

== Singles main-draw entrants ==
=== Seeds ===
Country	Player	Rank^{1}	Seed
ITA	Matteo Berrettini	124	1
FRA	Gleb Sakharov	160	2
EST	Jürgen Zopp	166	3
GER	Mats Moraing	174	4
ITA	Lorenzo Sonego	176	5
ESP	Jaume Munar	180	6
ITA	Salvatore Caruso	188	7
BLR	Uladzimir Ignatik	189	8

- ^{1} Rankings were as of 12 February 2018.

=== Other entrants ===
The following players received wildcards into the singles main draw:

- (Spain) Alejandro Davidovich Fokina
- (Netherlands) Thiemo de Bakker
- (Latvia) Ernests Gulbis
- (Italy) Gianluigi Quinzi

The following players received entry into the singles main draw as special exempts:

- (Italy) Matteo Berrettini
- (France) Constant Lestienne

The following players received entry from the qualifying draw:

- (France) Sadio Doumbia
- (Lithuania) Laurynas Grigelis
- (Slovakia) Filip Horanský
- (Croatia) Nino Serdarušić

The following players received entry as lucky losers:

- (Italy) Andrea Basso
- (Italy) Luca Vanni

== Champions ==
=== Singles ===
- (Italy) Matteo Berrettini def. (Italy) Stefano Napolitano 6–2, 3–6, 6–2.

=== Doubles ===
- (United Kingdom) Scott Clayton / (United Kingdom) Jonny O'Mara def. (Lithuania) Laurynas Grigelis / (Italy) Alessandro Motti 5–7, 6–3, [15–13].
