= 2021 Trofeo Faip–Perrel =

- Date: 1–7 November
- Edition: 16th
- Surface: Hard (Indoor)
- Location: Bergamo, Italy

Champions

Singles
- (Denmark) Holger Rune

Doubles
- (Czech Republic) Zdeněk Kolář / (Czech Republic) Jiří Lehečka
← 2020 ·	Trofeo Faip–Perrel	· 2022 →

The 2021 Trofeo Faip–Perrel was a professional tennis tournament played on hard courts. It was the sixteenth edition of the tournament which was part of the 2021 ATP Challenger Tour. It took place in Bergamo, Italy between 1 and 7 November 2021.

== Singles main-draw entrants ==
=== Seeds ===
Country	Player	Rank^{1}	Seed
SVK	Alex Molčan	114	1
AUT	Dennis Novak	116	2
DEN	Holger Rune	121	3
MDA	Radu Albot	123	4
GBR	Liam Broady	124	5
CZE	Zdeněk Kolář	138	6
SRB	Nikola Milojević	139	7
BIH	Damir Džumhur	140	8

- ^{1} Rankings were as of 25 October 2021.

=== Other entrants ===
The following players received wildcards into the singles main draw:

- (Italy) Matteo Arnaldi
- (Italy) Flavio Cobolli
- (Italy) Luca Nardi

The following player received entry into the singles main draw using a protected ranking:

- (Germany) Yannick Maden

The following players received entry into the singles main draw as alternates:

- (France) Maxime Janvier
- (Ukraine) Sergiy Stakhovsky

The following players received entry from the qualifying draw:

- (Bosnia and Herzegovina) Nerman Fatić
- (Russia) Pavel Kotov
- (Hungary) Fábián Marozsán
- (Italy) Luca Potenza

The following player received entry as a lucky loser:

- (Croatia) Nino Serdarušić

== Champions ==
=== Singles ===
- (Denmark) Holger Rune def. (Turkey) Cem İlkel 7–5, 7–6^{(8–6)}.

=== Doubles ===
- (Czech Republic) Zdeněk Kolář / (Czech Republic) Jiří Lehečka def. (United Kingdom) Lloyd Glasspool / (Finland) Harri Heliövaara 6–4, 6–4.
