= Trofeo Faip–Perrel =

ATP Challenger Tour
- Event name: Trofeo Faip–Perrel - Internazionali di Bergamo
- Location: Bergamo, Italy
- Venue: ChorusLife Arena (2025), Centro Sportivo Italcementi (2023), PalaNorda (-2022)
- Category: Challenger 125 (2027-), Challenger 100 (2025), Tretorn SERIE+
- Surface: Hard (indoor)
- Draw: 32S/32Q/16Q
- Prize money: €145,250 (2025), €64,000+H
- Website: Website

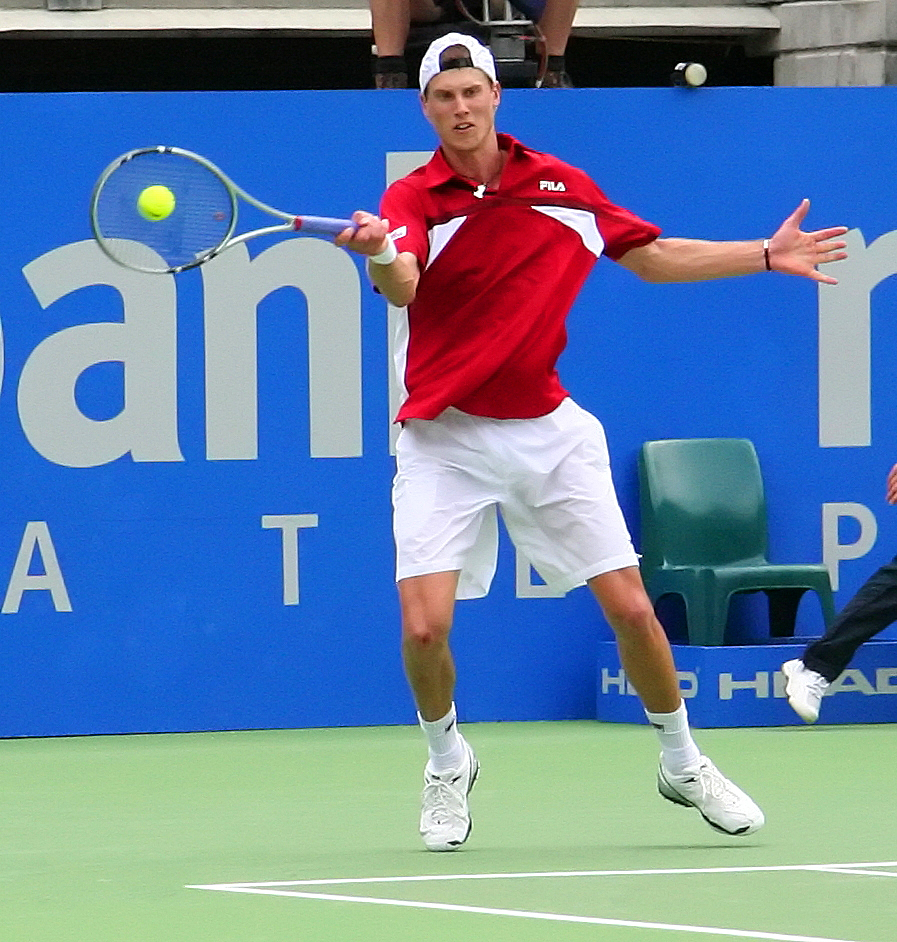
The 2008 champion, Andreas Seppi, was the first Italian to win the singles when he claimed victory in both singles and doubles (with Bolelli)

The Trofeo Faip–Perrel - Internazionali di Bergamo is a professional tennis tournament played on indoor hardcourts at the ChorusLife Arena. It is part of the ATP Challenger Tour 125. In 2025 after a year hiatus (when the event was moved to Rovereto), it came back to Bergamo as an upgraded Challenger 100. In 2027, after a one year hiatus, it came back again, this time upgraded to a Challenger 125.

It was held annually at the PalaNorda di Bergamo - Palazzetto di Bergamo, in Bergamo, Italy from 2006 until 2022. It was part of the Tretorn SERIE+ in 2009.

== Past finals ==
=== Singles ===
Year	Champion	Runner-up	Score
2026	Not held		
2025	(Italy) Francesco Maestrelli	(Germany) Marko Topo	6–3, 3–6, 6–1
2024	Not held in Bergamo, moved to Rovereto		
2023	(United Kingdom) Jack Draper	(Belgium) David Goffin	1–6, 7–6^{(7–3)}, 6–3
2022	(Finland) Otto Virtanen	(Germany) Jan-Lennard Struff	6–2, 7–5
2021	(Denmark) Holger Rune	(Turkey) Cem İlkel	7–5, 7–6^{(8–6)}
2020	(Ukraine) Illya Marchenko vs. (France) Enzo Couacaud		canceled due to coronavirus
2019	(Italy) Jannik Sinner	(Italy) Roberto Marcora	6–3, 6–1
2018	(Italy) Matteo Berrettini	(Italy) Stefano Napolitano	6–2, 3–6, 6–2
2017	(Poland) Jerzy Janowicz	(France) Quentin Halys	6–4, 6–4
2016	(France) Pierre-Hugues Herbert	(Belarus) Egor Gerasimov	6–3, 7–6^{(7–5)}
2015	(France) Benoît Paire	(Kazakhstan) Aleksandr Nedovyesov	6–3, 7–6^{(7–3)}
2014	(Italy) Simone Bolelli	(Germany) Jan-Lennard Struff	7–6^{(8–6)}, 6–4
2013	(Poland) Michał Przysiężny	(Germany) Jan-Lennard Struff	4–6, 7–6^{(7–5)}, 7–6^{(7–5)}
2012	(Germany) Björn Phau	(Russia) Alexander Kudryavtsev	6–4, 6–4
2011	(Italy) Andreas Seppi	(Luxembourg) Gilles Müller	3–6, 6–3, 6–4
2010	(Slovakia) Karol Beck	(Luxembourg) Gilles Müller	6–4, 6–4
2009	(Czech Republic) Lukáš Rosol	(Germany) Benedikt Dorsch	6–1, 4–6, 7–6^{(7–3)}
2008	(Italy) Andreas Seppi	(France) Julien Benneteau	2–6, 6–2, 7–5
2007	(France) Fabrice Santoro	(Italy) Simone Bolelli	6–2, 6–1
2006	(United Kingdom) Alex Bogdanovic	(Italy) Simone Bolelli	6–1, 3–0 retired

=== Doubles ===
Year	Champions	Runners-up	Score
2026	Not held		
2025	(United Kingdom) Joshua Paris (United Kingdom) Marcus Willis	(Czech Republic) David Poljak (Germany) Tim Rühl	7–6^{(7–3)}, 6–4
2024	Not held in Bergamo, moved to Rovereto		
2023	(United States) Evan King (United States) Brandon Nakashima	(Portugal) Francisco Cabral (United Kingdom) Henry Patten	6–4, 7–6^{(7–1)}
2022	(Germany) Henri Squire (Germany) Jan-Lennard Struff	(France) Jonathan Eysseric (France) Albano Olivetti	6–4, 6–7^{(5–7)}, [10–7]
2021	(Czech Republic) Zdeněk Kolář (Czech Republic) Jiří Lehečka	(United Kingdom) Lloyd Glasspool (Finland) Harri Heliövaara	6–4, 6–4
2020	(Czech Republic) Zdeněk Kolář (Italy) Julian Ocleppo	(Switzerland) Luca Margaroli (Italy) Andrea Vavassori	6–4, 6–3
2019	(Lithuania) Laurynas Grigelis (Czech Republic) Zdeněk Kolář	(Bosnia and Herzegovina) Tomislav Brkić (Germany) Dustin Brown	7–5, 7–6^{(9–7)}
2018	(United Kingdom) Scott Clayton (United Kingdom) Jonny O'Mara	(Lithuania) Laurynas Grigelis (Italy) Alessandro Motti	5–7, 6–3, [15–13]
2017	(Austria) Julian Knowle (Canada) Adil Shamasdin	(Croatia) Dino Marcan (Austria) Tristan-Samuel Weissborn	6–3, 6–3
2016	(United Kingdom) Ken Skupski (United Kingdom) Neal Skupski	(Croatia) Nikola Mektić (Croatia) Antonio Šančić	6–3, 7–5
2015	(Germany) Martin Emmrich (Sweden) Andreas Siljeström	(Poland) Błażej Koniusz (Poland) Mateusz Kowalczyk	6–4, 7–5
2014	(Slovakia) Karol Beck (Slovakia) Michal Mertiňák	(Russia) Konstantin Kravchuk (Ukraine) Denys Molchanov	4–6, 7–5, [10–6]
2013	(Slovakia) Karol Beck (Slovakia) Andrej Martin	(Italy) Claudio Grassi (Israel) Amir Weintraub	6–3, 3–6, [10–8]
2012	(United Kingdom) Jamie Delgado (United Kingdom) Ken Skupski	(Austria) Martin Fischer (Austria) Philipp Oswald	7–5, 7–5
2011	(Denmark) Frederik Nielsen (United Kingdom) Ken Skupski	(Russia) Michail Elgin (Russia) Alexandre Kudryavtsev	walkover
2010	(United Kingdom) Jonathan Marray (United Kingdom) Jamie Murray	(Slovakia) Karol Beck (Czech Republic) Jiří Krkoška	1–6, 7–6^{(7–2)}, [10–8]
2009	(Slovakia) Karol Beck (Czech Republic) Jaroslav Levinský	(South Africa) Chris Haggard (Czech Republic) Pavel Vízner	7–6^{(8–6)}, 6–4
2008	(Italy) Simone Bolelli (Italy) Andreas Seppi	(United States) James Cerretani (Slovakia) Igor Zelenay	6–3, 6–0
2007	(France) Jérôme Haehnel (Monaco) Jean-René Lisnard	(Denmark) Kenneth Carlsen (Denmark) Frederik Nielsen	6–3, 2–6, [10–4]
2006	(Italy) Daniele Bracciali (Italy) Giorgio Galimberti	(Germany) Christopher Kas (Germany) Philipp Petzschner	7–5, 0–6, [13–11]
